= Jamaica national football team results =

This article summarizes the outcomes of all official matches played by the Jamaica national football team by opponent and by decade, since they first played in official competitions in 1925.

== All-time results ==
The following table shows Jamaica's all-time international record, correct as of 5 October 2026.

Against	Played	Won	Drawn	Lost	GF	GA
Total	556	213	134	210	712	708

== Results ==
=== 1925–1999 ===
Jamaica national football team results
Date	Venue	Opponents	Score	Competition	Jamaica scorers	Att.	Ref.
22 March 1925	(A)	Haiti	2–1	Friendly	Passalaigue 5', Paxton 38'	10000	
26 March 1925	(A)	Haiti	3–0	Friendly	Lewis, Moody, Unknown	7500	
29 March 1925	(A)	Haiti	1–0	Friendly	Lewis	7500	
3 March 1926	(H)	Curaçao	2–0	Friendly	Cruchley, Sasso		
20 November 1926	(H)	Haiti	6–0	Friendly	Cruchley (3), Sasso (2), Passalaigue	1200	
16 March 1930	(A)	Cuba	1–3	1930 Central American and Caribbean Games	Unknown		
18 March 1930	(N)	Honduras	1–5	1930 Central American and Caribbean Games	Unknown		
13 March 1932	(A)	Haiti	1–4	Friendly	McKenzie	5000	
20 March 1932	(A)	Haiti	1–0	Friendly	Greenwood		
28 December 1935	(H)	Trinidad and Tobago	2–3	Friendly	Parke, da Costa		
4 January 1936	(H)	Trinidad and Tobago	0–1	Friendly			
11 January 1936	(H)	Trinidad and Tobago	1–2	Friendly	Sasso 20'		
13 March 1938	(A)	Haiti	2–5	Friendly	da Costa (3), Kinkead 68' pen.	10000	
17 March 1938	(A)	Haiti	0–2	Friendly		9000	
20 March 1938	(A)	Haiti	0–2	Friendly		6000	
26 February 1943	(A)	Cuba	0–0	Friendly			
2 March 1943	(A)	Cuba	1–0	Friendly	Unknown		
12 February 1947	(H)	Trinidad and Tobago	0–0	Friendly		10000	
15 February 1947	(H)	Trinidad and Tobago	2–1	Friendly	McMorris, Smith	15000	
19 February 1947	(H)	Trinidad and Tobago	1–0	Friendly	McMorris		
22 February 1947	(H)	Trinidad and Tobago	1–2	Friendly	McMorris 2'		
26 February 1947	(H)	Trinidad and Tobago	0–6	Friendly		12000	
6 November 1947	(N)	British Guiana	0–2	Friendly			
8 November 1947	(A)	Trinidad and Tobago	0–6	Friendly			
10 November 1947	(N)	British Guiana	0–0	Friendly			
13 November 1947	(A)	Trinidad and Tobago	0–1	Friendly			
9 June 1948	(H)	Cuba	3–0	Friendly	McMorris, Alexander (2)		
12 June 1948	(H)	Cuba	1–1	Friendly	McLean 40'		
9 October 1948	(H)	Haiti	1–0	Friendly	McLean	12000	
13 October 1948	(H)	Haiti	1–2	Friendly	Mason 34'	10000	
16 October 1948	(H)	Haiti	3–0	Friendly	McLean 6', McMorris, Alcock	16000	
2 May 1949	(H)	Trinidad and Tobago	3–1	Friendly	McLean, Coy (2)	8000	
4 May 1949	(H)	Trinidad and Tobago	2–1	Friendly	Coy, Alcock 44'		
7 May 1949	(H)	Trinidad and Tobago	1–2	Friendly	Unknown		
19 December 1949	(A)	Haiti	0–2	Friendly			
14 October 1950	(H)	Haiti	2–1	Friendly	Unknown 43', 87'		
25 May 1951	(A)	Barbados	0–3	Friendly		5000	
26 May 1951	(A)	Barbados	1–0	Friendly	o.g. 85'		
28 May 1951	(A)	Barbados	2–5	Friendly	o.g. 1', Miller 51'		
26 December 1951	(H)	Haiti	2–2	Friendly	Miller 16', Tappin 34'	3000	
27 December 1951	(H)	Haiti	0–1	Friendly			
29 December 1951	(H)	Haiti	2–1	Friendly	Tappin 55', Miret 89'		
19 July 1952	(A)	Haiti	1–4	Friendly	Alcock 44'	25000	
20 July 1952	(A)	Haiti	3–3	Friendly	Tappin 7', Alcock 32', 44'	27000	
23 July 1952	(A)	Haiti	0–2	Friendly			
27 July 1952	(A)	Haiti	2–3	Friendly	Tappin (2)		
10 August 1953	(H)	Trinidad and Tobago	3–2	Friendly	Alcock 28', Williams 33', Beek 48'	3000	
11 August 1953	(H)	Trinidad and Tobago	0–1	Friendly		4000	
14 November 1953	(A)	Haiti	1–4	Friendly	Alcock 40'	18000	
21 November 1953	(A)	Haiti	0–1	Friendly		17000	
21 January 1957	(H)	Trinidad and Tobago	2–0	Friendly	Hill 14', Alexander 45'	6000	
26 January 1957	(H)	Trinidad and Tobago	1–0	Friendly	Alexander 68' pen.	5000	
28 January 1957	(H)	Trinidad and Tobago	2–1	Friendly	Alexander 26', McLean 38'		
4 May 1958	(A)	Trinidad and Tobago	0–1	Friendly		10000	
11 May 1958	(A)	Trinidad and Tobago	0–4	Friendly		10000	
13 May 1958	(A)	Trinidad and Tobago	1–0	Friendly	Alexander 24' pen.		
1 March 1959	(N)	British Guiana	2–2	Friendly	Wong, East	6000	
4 March 1959	(N)	Barbados	3–1	Friendly	Parker 36', 47', 57'	400	
10 March 1959	(A)	Trinidad and Tobago	1–2	Friendly	Parker 39'	4000	
19 May 1962	(H)	Haiti	3–4	Friendly	Lewin 37', Clarke 38', Blair 51'	7000	
21 May 1962	(H)	Haiti	1–3	Friendly	Bartlett 9'		
23 May 1962	(H)	Haiti	2–5	Friendly	Hill 60', Schloss 75'		
7 July 1962	(H)	Netherlands Antilles	4–4	Friendly	Unknown		
9 July 1962	(H)	Netherlands Antilles	2–1	Friendly	Unknown		
11 July 1962	(H)	Netherlands Antilles	1–2	Friendly	East 65' pen.		
13 August 1962	(H)	Puerto Rico	6–1	1962 Central American and Caribbean Games	Largie 15', Chavannes 33', 40', Lewin 49', East 56', Bartlett 87'	14000	
15 August 1962	(H)	Netherlands Antilles	1–3	1962 Central American and Caribbean Games	Schloss 40'		
17 August 1962	(H)	Venezuela	0–2	1962 Central American and Caribbean Games			
24 August 1962	(H)	Cuba	6–1	1962 Central American and Caribbean Games	Chavannes (2) 2', 5', Bartlett (3), East (pen.)	12000	
23 February 1963	(H)	Haiti	3–2	Friendly	Bartlett 28', 80', Lewin 48'	15000	
27 February 1963	(H)	Netherlands Antilles	1–2	Friendly	o.g. 30'	11000	
4 March 1963	(H)	Netherlands Antilles	1–2	Friendly	Unknown		
6 March 1963	(H)	Haiti	0–3	Friendly			
24 March 1963	(N)	Costa Rica	0–6	1963 CONCACAF Championship			
28 March 1963	(N)	Mexico	0–8	1963 CONCACAF Championship		35000	
30 March 1963	(N)	Netherlands Antilles	1–2	1963 CONCACAF Championship	Dunkley 26'		
5 August 1963	(H)	El Salvador	0–1	Friendly		8000	
7 August 1963	(H)	El Salvador	0–0	Friendly			
9 August 1963	(H)	El Salvador	1–2	Friendly	Unknown		
16 January 1965	Independence Park, Kingston (H)	Cuba	2–0	1966 FIFA World Cup qualification	Black 11', Blair 51'	10,100	
23 January 1965	Independence Park, Kingston (H)	Netherlands Antilles	2–0	1966 FIFA World Cup qualification	Dunkley 11', 64'	12,264	
3 February 1965	Pedro Marrero Stadium, Havana (N)	Netherlands Antilles	0–0	1966 FIFA World Cup qualification		1,218	
8 February 1965	Pedro Marrero Stadium, Havana (A)	Cuba	1–2	1966 FIFA World Cup qualification	Dunkley 14'	1,176	
3 May 1965	Independence Park, Kingston (H)	Mexico	2–3	1966 FIFA World Cup qualification	Welsh 11', Bartlett 36'	8,138	
7 May 1965	Estadio Ciudad de los Deportes, Mexico City (A)	Mexico	0–8	1966 FIFA World Cup qualification		52,017	
11 May 1965	Estadio Nacional de Costa Rica, San José (A)	Costa Rica	0–7	1966 FIFA World Cup qualification		4,003	
22 May 1965	Independence Park, Kingston (H)	Costa Rica	1–1	1966 FIFA World Cup qualification	Welsh 70'	3,031	
5 August 1965	(H)	Trinidad and Tobago	4–0	Friendly	Dunkley 26', Welsh 35', 36', Black 76'	8000	
28 December 1965	(A)	Bermuda	3–0	Friendly	Dunkley, Cameron, Black	–	
11 June 1966	(N)	Netherlands Antilles	0–0	1966 Coupe Duvalier		5000	
13 June 1966	(N)	Guadeloupe	0–0	1966 Coupe Duvalier		–	
15 June 1966	(N)	Trinidad and Tobago	1–4	1966 Coupe Duvalier	Miller 29'	–	
17 June 1966	(N)	Suriname	3–5	1966 Coupe Duvalier	Miller 13', 75', Cameron 23'		
22 June 1966	(A)	Haiti	0–3	1966 Coupe Duvalier		14700	
11 January 1967	(H)	Netherlands Antilles	1–1	1967 CONCACAF Championship qualification	Oxford 13'	8500	
14 January 1967	(H)	Cuba	2–1	1967 CONCACAF Championship qualification	Welsh 20', 32'	15000	
18 January 1967	(H)	Trinidad and Tobago	1–1	1967 CONCACAF Championship qualification	Welsh 85'	–	
21 January 1967	(H)	Haiti	0–1	1967 CONCACAF Championship qualification		23000	
25 November 1967	(A)	Trinidad and Tobago	0–1	Friendly			
2 December 1967	(A)	Trinidad and Tobago	0–1	Friendly			
27 November 1968	Estadio Nacional de Costa Rica, San José (A)	Costa Rica	0–3	1970 FIFA World Cup qualification		14,940	
1 December 1968	Estadio Nacional de Costa Rica, San José (A)	Costa Rica	1–3	1970 FIFA World Cup qualification	Dunkley	11,273	
5 December 1968	Estadio Nacional, Tegucigalpa (A)	Honduras	1–3	1970 FIFA World Cup qualification	Welsh 89'	7,441	
8 December 1968	Estadio Nacional, Tegucigalpa (A)	Honduras	0–2	1970 FIFA World Cup qualification		3,577	
6 February 1969	(A)	Haiti	2–1	Friendly	Graham 17', Blair 53'		
8 February 1969	(A)	Haiti	0–3	Friendly			
3 November 1969	(H)	Panama	1–1	1969 CONCACAF Championship qualification	Ziadie (pen.)	8000	
5 November 1969	(H)	Panama	2–1	1969 CONCACAF Championship qualification	Largie 27', Hill 85'		
23 November 1969	(A)	Costa Rica	0–3	1969 CONCACAF Championship		7389	
27 November 1969	(N)	Mexico	0–2	1969 CONCACAF Championship		–	
30 November 1969	(N)	Trinidad and Tobago	2–3	1969 CONCACAF Championship	Scott 20', Hamilton 31'	20460	
4 December 1969	(N)	Guatemala	0–0	1969 CONCACAF Championship			
6 December 1969	(N)	Netherlands Antilles	1–2	1969 CONCACAF Championship	Largie		
1971	(A)	Bermuda	1–1	Friendly	Unknown		
1 October 1971	(H)	Cuba	0–1	1971 CONCACAF Championship qualification			
4 October 1971	(A)	Cuba	0–0	1971 CONCACAF Championship qualification			
2 April 1972	(H)	Cuba	2–0	Friendly	Harris 6', Campbell 54'	4000	
24 December 1972	(A)	Bermuda	0–0	Friendly			
27 December 1972	(A)	Bermuda	3–0	Friendly	Unknown		
4 November 1973	(A)	Guyana	1–2	Friendly	Smith 15'		
28 March 1974	(H)	Uruguay	0–3	Friendly			
30 August 1974	(N)	Haiti	1–0	Friendly	Lattimore 54'		
31 August 1974	(N)	Trinidad and Tobago	2–1	Friendly	Unknown		
6 February 1975	(H)	Haiti	0–1	Friendly			
25 February 1975	(A)	Haiti	2–3	Friendly	Marston 5', 20'	10000	
15 August 1976	Independence Park, Kingston (H)	Cuba	1–3	1977 CONCACAF Championship qualification	Brown 65'	13,000	
29 August 1976	Estadio Latinoamericano, Havana (A)	Cuba	0–2	1977 CONCACAF Championship qualification		30,000	
23 October 1977	(H)	China	0–1	Friendly		6000	
31 October 1977	(H)	China	0–3	Friendly			
2 July 1978	(A)	Guadeloupe	0–1	1978 CFU Championship			
30 July 1978	(H)	Guadeloupe	1–2	1978 CFU Championship	Clarke 14'		
3 June 1979	(H)	Saint Kitts and Nevis	2–1	1979 CFU Championship	Bell 58', Welch 88'		
17 June 1979	(A)	Saint Kitts and Nevis	2–1	1979 CFU Championship	Donaldson, Andrews		
26 August 1979	(A)	Cuba	0–2	Friendly			
28 October 1979	(A)	Haiti	0–3	1979 CFU Championship			
2 November 1979	(H)	Haiti	0–4	1979 CFU Championship			
7 June 1981	(H)	Trinidad and Tobago	2–0	1981 CFU Championship	Hyde 46', Russell 61'		
19 June 1981	(A)	Trinidad and Tobago	0–4	1981 CFU Championship			
29 April 1984	(H)	Haiti	0–1	Friendly		7000	
13 March 1985	(H)	Canada	1–1	Friendly	Unknown	8000	
17 March 1985	(H)	Canada	0–0	Friendly			
20 April 1985	(H)	Barbados	2–2	Friendly	Unknown		
5 February 1986	(N)	Paraguay	1–4	Friendly	Downer 82'	5182	
1987	(A)	Cayman Islands	3–1	Friendly	Tulloch (2), Unknown		
22 March 1987	(H)	Barbados	0–0	Friendly			
5 April 1987	(H)	Barbados	0–1	Friendly			
5 April 1988	(H)	Canada	0–4	Friendly			
7 April 1988	(H)	Canada	0–0	Friendly		6000	
12 May 1988	Independence Park, Kingston (H)	Puerto Rico	1–0	1989 CONCACAF Championship qualification	Brooks 10' pen.	36,000	
29 May 1988	Estadio Sixto Escobar, San Juan (A)	Puerto Rico	2–1	1989 CONCACAF Championship qualification	Anglin 32', 78'	675	
10 July 1988	(H)	Barbados	0–0	Friendly			
24 July 1988	Independence Park, Kingston (H)	United States	0–0	1989 CONCACAF Championship qualification		15,000	
13 August 1988	St. Louis Soccer Park, Fenton (A)	United States	1–5	1989 CONCACAF Championship qualification	Sterling 54'	6,100	
12 March 1989	(H)	Paraguay	0–3	Friendly			
26 March 1989	Barbados National Stadium, Saint Michael (A)	Barbados	1–1	Friendly	Dias 87'		
28 March 1989	Barbados National Stadium, Saint Michael (A)	Barbados	1–1 (4–3 p)	Friendly	Martin 16'		
23 April 1989	(A)	Antigua and Barbuda	0–1	1989 Caribbean Cup qualification		3000	
7 May 1989	(H)	Guadeloupe	1–3	1989 Caribbean Cup qualification	Newman 40'		
4 June 1989	(A)	Dominica	0–0	1989 Caribbean Cup qualification			
18 June 1989	(H)	Saint Lucia	1–1	1989 Caribbean Cup qualification	Young 85'	3000	
16 March 1990	Jarrett Park, Montego Bay (H)	Barbados	0–1	Friendly			
18 March 1990	Independence Park, Kingston (H)	Barbados	1–0 (1–3 p)	Friendly	Anglin 47'		
29 April 1990	(H)	Saint Kitts and Nevis	3–0	1990 Caribbean Cup qualification	Stephenson 44', 74', Reid 62'	10000	
13 May 1990	(A)	Cayman Islands	2–1	1990 Caribbean Cup qualification	Unknown		
20 May 1990	(H)	Saint Martin	1–0	1990 Caribbean Cup qualification	Maxwell 30'	15000	
30 May 1990	(A)	Guadeloupe	0–0	1990 Caribbean Cup qualification		300	
25 July 1990	(N)	Grenada	0–0	1990 Caribbean Cup			
27 July 1990	(A)	Trinidad and Tobago	0–0	1990 Caribbean Cup			
5 May 1991	(H)	Haiti	2–1	Friendly	Jarrett 62', Boyd 85'		
6 May 1991	(H)	Haiti	2–0	Friendly	Unknown		
24 May 1991	(H)	Guyana	6–0	1991 Caribbean Cup	Palmer 4', Davis 14', 48', Reid 63', Gaynor 74', Boyd 86'		
26 May 1991	(H)	Cayman Islands	3–2	1991 Caribbean Cup	Davis 2', 47', Long 89'	6000	
30 May 1991	(H)	Saint Lucia	2–0	1991 Caribbean Cup	Davis 18', Reid 88'	10000	
2 June 1991	(H)	Trinidad and Tobago	2–0	1991 Caribbean Cup	Davis 6', Anglin 49'	27000	
28 June 1991	Los Angeles Memorial Coliseum, Los Angeles (N)	Mexico	1–4	1991 Gold Cup	Reid 39'	13,374	
30 June 1991	Los Angeles Memorial Coliseum, Los Angeles (N)	Honduras	0–5	1991 Gold Cup		4,797	
3 July 1991	Los Angeles Memorial Coliseum, Los Angeles (N)	Canada	2–3	1991 Gold Cup	Wright 42', Reid 63	36,703	
12 September 1991	(A)	Bermuda	1–1	Friendly	Unknown		
14 September 1991	(A)	United States	0–1	Friendly		9128	
12 April 1992	(H)	Bermuda	0–0	Friendly			
23 May 1992	Independence Park, Kingston (H)	Puerto Rico	2–1	1994 FIFA World Cup qualification	Hyde 57', Wilson 67'	3,057	
30 May 1992	San Juan (A)	Puerto Rico	1–0	1994 FIFA World Cup qualification	Wright 31'	3,500	
18 June 1992	(N)	Saint Vincent and the Grenadines	2–0	1992 Caribbean Cup	Cargill 13', Graham 38'		
20 June 1992	(N)	Guadeloupe	1–0	1992 Caribbean Cup			
22 June 1992	(N)	Cuba	0–0	1992 Caribbean Cup			
24 June 1992	(N)	Martinique	1–0	1992 Caribbean Cup	Reid 78'		
26 June 1992	(A)	Trinidad and Tobago	1–3	1992 Caribbean Cup	Graham 49'	21502	
5 July 1992	Queen's Park Oval, Port of Spain (A)	Trinidad and Tobago	2–1	1994 FIFA World Cup qualification	Isaacs 52', Anglin 65'	22,000	
16 August 1992	Independence Park, Kingston (H)	Trinidad and Tobago	1–1	1994 FIFA World Cup qualification	Davis 28'	16,000	
22 September 1992	(A)	Honduras	1–5	Friendly	Anglin 28'	10300	
24 September 1992	(A)	Honduras	0–7	Friendly		8566	
27 September 1992	(A)	Saint Vincent and the Grenadines	1–0	Friendly	Davis 78'	3000	
4 October 1992	(H)	Saint Vincent and the Grenadines	3–3	Friendly	Wright 24', Hamilton 66', Davis 89'		
18 October 1992	Independence Park, Kingston (H)	Canada	1–1	1994 FIFA World Cup qualification	Wright 78'	17000	
25 October 1992	Bermuda National Stadium, Hamilton (A)	Bermuda	1–1	1994 FIFA World Cup qualification	Davis 73'	4500	
1 November 1992	Toronto (A)	Canada	0–1	1994 FIFA World Cup qualification		6526	
8 November 1992	Independence Park, Kingston (H)	Bermuda	3–2	1994 FIFA World Cup qualification	Wright 5', 75' pen., Reid 8'	18000	
22 November 1992	Independence Park, Kingston (H)	El Salvador	0–2	1994 FIFA World Cup qualification		20000	
2 December 1992	(A)	Guatemala	1–2	Friendly	Unknown		
6 December 1992	Cuscatlán Stadium, San Salvador (A)	El Salvador	1–2	1994 FIFA World Cup qualification	Davis 35'	36625	
21 May 1993	(H)	Saint Kitts and Nevis	4–1	1993 Caribbean Cup	Unknown		
23 May 1993	(H)	Sint Maarten	2–0	1993 Caribbean Cup	Unknown		
25 May 1993	(H)	Puerto Rico	1–0	1993 Caribbean Cup	Unknown		
28 May 1993	(H)	Trinidad and Tobago	3–0	1993 Caribbean Cup	Davis 19', Anglin 60', Reid 89'	12569	
30 May 1993	(H)	Martinique	0–0 (5–6 p)	1993 Caribbean Cup		25467	
4 July 1993	(H)	Costa Rica	1–1	Friendly	Unknown		
10 July 1993	Cotton Bowl, Dallas (N)	United States	0–1	1993 Gold Cup		11,642	
14 July 1993	Cotton Bowl, Dallas (N)	Honduras	3–1	1993 Gold Cup	Jarrett 28', Davis 48', Boyd 78'	13,771	
17 July 1993	Cotton Bowl, Dallas (N)	Panama	1–1	1993 Gold Cup	Davis 76'	18,527	
22 July 1993	Estadio Azteca, Mexico City (N)	Mexico	1–6	1993 Gold Cup	Wright 17'	110,000	
25 July 1993	Estadio Azteca, Mexico City (N)	Costa Rica	1–1	1993 Gold Cup	Jarrett 90+2'	130,000	
7 November 1993	(A)	United States	0–1	Friendly		5318	
2 March 1994	(N)	Sint Maarten	3–2 (a.s.d.e.t.)	1994 Caribbean Cup qualification	Unknown		
4 March 1994	(N)	British Virgin Islands	12–0	1994 Caribbean Cup qualification	Unknown		
6 March 1994	(A)	Cayman Islands	2–3	1994 Caribbean Cup qualification	Unknown		
22 November 1994	(H)	United States	0–3	Friendly		30199	
12 March 1995	(H)	Cuba	0–0	Friendly			
19 July 1995	(H)	Saint Lucia	2–1	1995 Caribbean Cup	Lowe 10', Wright 59' pen.	2000	
21 July 1995	(H)	Cuba	1–2	1995 Caribbean Cup	Whitmore	3000	
23 July 1995	(H)	Trinidad and Tobago	1–0	1995 Caribbean Cup	Whitmore	1890	
1 August 1995	(A)	Canada	1–3	Friendly	Lowe 33'	5883	
6 August 1995	(N)	Trinidad and Tobago	1–0	Friendly	Whitmore 88'	6782	
18 August 1995	(H)	Zambia	1–1	Friendly	Boyd		
20 August 1995	(H)	Zambia	3–1	Friendly	Boyd (2), Dixon		
24 September 1995	(A)	Trinidad and Tobago	0–1	Friendly			
27 September 1995	(H)	Costa Rica	2–0	Friendly	Young, Boyd		
18 October 1995	(H)	Honduras	1–0	Friendly	Stewart		
20 October 1995	(N)	Trinidad and Tobago	1–0	Friendly	Wright	5000	
22 October 1995	(A)	Cayman Islands	5–1	Friendly	Wright, Boyd (2), McDonald, Young		
2 November 1995	(A)	Zambia	0–1	Friendly		4000	
5 November 1995	(A)	Zambia	2–4	Friendly	Boyd 28', 70'	3500	
26 November 1995	(H)	Norway	1–1	Friendly	Wilson 89'	17500	
3 December 1995	(A)	Antigua and Barbuda	2–1	Friendly	Young (2)		
6 December 1995	(A)	Saint Kitts and Nevis	3–0	Friendly	Butler 36', McDonald 45', Lowe 72'		
14 January 1996	(H)	Cuba	1–1	Friendly	Malcolm 53		
3 March 1996	(H)	Guatemala	2–0	Friendly	Goodison 38', Palmer 54'	10000	
31 March 1996	Dr. Ir. Franklin Essed Stadion, Paramaribo (A)	Suriname	1–0	1998 FIFA World Cup qualification	Whitmore 56'	2,500	
21 April 1996	Independence Park, Kingston (H)	Suriname	1–0	1998 FIFA World Cup qualification	Davis 72'	6,110	
24 April 1996	(H)	Barbados	2–0	1996 Caribbean Cup qualification	Young 44' pen., Davis 89'		
28 April 1996	(A)	Barbados	0–2 (4–3 p)	1996 Caribbean Cup qualification			
24 May 1996	(A)	Trinidad and Tobago	0–1	1996 Caribbean Cup		5000	
26 May 1996	(N)	Saint Kitts and Nevis	4–1	1996 Caribbean Cup	Wright 21', Davis 61', 72', Palmer 87'	4000	
28 May 1996	(N)	Suriname	1–3	1996 Caribbean Cup	Lowe 45'	7000	
23 June 1996	Hadley Court Stadium, Bridgetown (A)	Barbados	1–0	1998 FIFA World Cup qualification	Boyd 90'	5,000	
30 June 1996	Independence Park, Kingston (H)	Barbados	2–0	1998 FIFA World Cup qualification	Whitmore 23', Boyd 72'	15,000	
28 July 1996	(H)	Panama	0–0	Friendly			
24 August 1996	(A)	Panama	0–2	Friendly			
27 August 1996	(A)	Guatemala	1–2	Friendly	Young		
4 September 1996	(H)	Costa Rica	2–0	Friendly	Wright 7', Lowe 24'	8000	
15 September 1996	Independence Park, Kingston (H)	Honduras	3–0	1998 FIFA World Cup qualification	Boyd 14', 51', Whitmore 42'	21,000	
23 September 1996	Arnos Vale Stadium, Arnos Vale (A)	Saint Vincent and the Grenadines	2–1	1998 FIFA World Cup qualification	Young 21', 40'	4,000	
4 October 1996	(A)	Ecuador	1–2	Friendly	Lowe 43'	18000	
9 October 1996	(A)	Costa Rica	0–0	Friendly		12044	
16 October 1996	Estadio Azteca, Mexico City (A)	Mexico	1–2	1998 FIFA World Cup qualification	Boyd 70'	110,000	
26 October 1996	Estadio General Francisco Morazán, San Pedro Sula (A)	Honduras	0–0	1998 FIFA World Cup qualification		20,928	
10 November 1996	Independence Park, Kingston (H)	Saint Vincent and the Grenadines	5–0	1998 FIFA World Cup qualification	Whitmore 10', 13', Young 64', Cargill 66', Malcolm 85'	20,000	
17 November 1996	Independence Park, Kingston (H)	Mexico	1–0	1998 FIFA World Cup qualification	Goodison 82'	32,000	
12 February 1997	(H)	Venezuela	0–0	Friendly		5000	
21 February 1997	(H)	Bermuda	1–0	1997 Caribbean Cup qualification	Williams 6'		
23 February 1997	(H)	Bermuda	3–2	1997 Caribbean Cup qualification	Dixon 35', Malcolm 43', Sewell 62'		
2 March 1997	Independence Park, Kingston (H)	United States	0–0	1998 FIFA World Cup qualification		35,246	
23 March 1997	(A)	Bolivia	0–6	Friendly		5000	
13 April 1997	Estadio Azteca, Mexico City (A)	Mexico	0–6	1998 FIFA World Cup qualification		115,000	
27 April 1997	Swangard Stadium, Burnaby (A)	Canada	0–0	1998 FIFA World Cup qualification		7,634	
1 May 1997	(A)	Trinidad and Tobago	1–1	Friendly	Butler 63'	6000	
4 May 1997	(A)	Aruba	6–0	1997 Caribbean Cup qualification	Sewell, Whitmore (2), Young (3)		
11 May 1997	Estadio Ricardo Saprissa Aymá, San José (A)	Costa Rica	1–3	1998 FIFA World Cup qualification	Williams 61'	20,500	
18 May 1997	Independence Park, Kingston (H)	El Salvador	1–0	1998 FIFA World Cup qualification	Williams 22'	12,000	
29 June 1997	(H)	Cuba	3–0	Friendly	Hall, Cargill, Burton		
4 July 1997	(N)	Grenada	1–1	1997 Caribbean Cup	Hall 85'		
8 July 1997	(A)	Antigua and Barbuda	2–0	1997 Caribbean Cup	Simpson 26', Whitmore 87'	4000	
10 July 1997	(N)	Trinidad and Tobago	1–1 (2–4 p)	1997 Caribbean Cup	Whitmore 21'		
13 July 1997	(N)	Grenada	4–1	1997 Caribbean Cup	Hall 5', 20', Gardner 7', Young 85'	7500	
6 August 1997	(H)	Colombia	1–0	Friendly	Gardner 10'	8000	
7 September 1997	Independence Park, Kingston (H)	Canada	1–0	1998 FIFA World Cup qualification	Burton 55'	30,000	
14 September 1997	Independence Park, Kingston (H)	Costa Rica	1–0	1998 FIFA World Cup qualification	Burton 51'	30,000	
3 October 1997	Robert F. Kennedy Memorial Stadium, Washington, D.C. (A)	United States	1–1	1998 FIFA World Cup qualification	Burton 51'	51,528	
18 October 1997	(A)	Haiti	1–0	Friendly	Stewart 42'	15000	
24 October 1997	(A)	Saint Lucia	3–1	Friendly	Goodison 9', Wilson 15', Butler 49'		
26 October 1997	(A)	Antigua and Barbuda	3–0	Friendly	Griffiths 30', Young 39', Sewell 53'		
29 October 1997	(A)	Saint Kitts and Nevis	1–1	Friendly	Dixon 53'	5000	
9 November 1997	Cuscatlán Stadium, San Salvador (A)	El Salvador	2–2	1998 FIFA World Cup qualification	Burton 52', Hall 78'	34,200	
16 November 1997	Independence Park, Kingston (H)	Mexico	0–0	1998 FIFA World Cup qualification		35,700	
23 November 1997	(A)	Trinidad and Tobago	0–0	Friendly		20000	
7 January 1998	(A)	Trinidad and Tobago	0–0	Friendly			
29 January 1998	(H)	Sweden	0–0	Friendly		15000	
3 February 1998	Miami Orange Bowl, Miami (N)	Brazil	0–0	1998 Gold Cup		43,754	
8 February 1998	Los Angeles Memorial Coliseum, Los Angeles (N)	Guatemala	3–2	1998 Gold Cup	Hall 14', 66', Williams 55'	55,017	
9 February 1998	Los Angeles Memorial Coliseum, Los Angeles (N)	El Salvador	2–0	1998 Gold Cup	Gayle 41', Simpson 62'	5,791	
12 February 1998	Los Angeles Memorial Coliseum, Los Angeles (N)	Mexico	0–1 (a.s.d.e.t.)	1998 Gold Cup		45,507	
15 February 1998	Los Angeles Memorial Coliseum, Los Angeles (N)	Brazil	0–1	1998 Gold Cup		91,255	
22 February 1998	(H)	Nigeria	2–2	Friendly	Goodison 37', Williams 40'	20000	
25 March 1998	(A)	Wales	0–0	Friendly		13349	
20 April 1998	(N)	Macedonia	1–2	1998 LG Cup	Hall 70' pen.	60000	
22 April 1998	(A)	Iran	0–1	1998 LG Cup		100000	
4 May 1998	(N)	Saudi Arabia	0–0	Friendly		500	
16 May 1998	(A)	South Korea	1–2	Friendly	Powell 41'	40000	
19 May 1998	(A)	South Korea	0–0	Friendly		30000	
14 June 1998	Stade Félix-Bollaert, Lens (N)	Croatia	1–3	1998 FIFA World Cup	Earle 45'	38,058	
21 June 1998	Parc des Princes, Paris (N)	Argentina	0–5	1998 FIFA World Cup		48,500	
26 June 1998	Stade de Gerland, Lyon (N)	Japan	2–1	1998 FIFA World Cup	Whitmore 39', 54'	43,500	
22 July 1998	(H)	Cayman Islands	4–0	1998 Caribbean Cup	Goodison 17', Boyd 69', Whitmore 76', 86'		
24 July 1998	(H)	Netherlands Antilles	3–2	1998 Caribbean Cup	Lowe 1', Goodison 40', Boyd 88'		
26 July 1998	(H)	Haiti	2–1	1998 Caribbean Cup	Goodison 51', McDonald 83'		
29 July 1998	(N)	Antigua and Barbuda	1–0 (a.s.d.e.t.)	1998 Caribbean Cup	Lowe 110'	4000	
31 July 1998	(A)	Trinidad and Tobago	2–1	1998 Caribbean Cup	McDonald 20', Sewell 34'	8000	
10 February 1999	(H)	Costa Rica	1–1	Friendly	Burton 82'	16000	
24 February 1999	(A)	Costa Rica	0–9	Friendly		5000	
3 March 1999	Estadio Nacional Mateo Flores, Guatemala City (N)	Bolivia	0–0	Copa Paz del Chaco		15,000	
5 March 1999	Estadio Nacional Mateo Flores, Guatemala City (N)	Paraguay	1–3	Copa Paz del Chaco	Whitmore 22'	10,000	
7 March 1999	Estadio Nacional Mateo Flores, Guatemala City (N)	Guatemala	4–2	Copa Paz del Chaco	Davis 1' pen., 29', Fuller 11', Whitmore 43' pen.	8,000	
28 March 1999	(A)	Trinidad and Tobago	0–2	Friendly		28000	
31 March 1999	(H)	Paraguay	3–0	Friendly	Gayle 5', Whitmore 37', Johnson 47'	25000	
9 May 1999	(H)	South Africa	1–1	Friendly	Whitmore 37'	4000	
20 May 1999	(A)	Norway	0–6	Friendly		9630	
27 May 1999	(A)	Sweden	1–2	Friendly	Gayle 76'	27298	
3 June 1999	(A)	Trinidad and Tobago	0–1	1999 Caribbean Cup		4000	
5 June 1999	(N)	Guadeloupe	5–1	1999 Caribbean Cup	Davis 43', Griffiths 57', Graham 62', 74', 83'	1000	
7 June 1999	N	Grenada	2–1	1999 Caribbean Cup	Graham 62', Fuller 72'		
10 June 1999	(N)	Cuba	0–2	1999 Caribbean Cup			
13 July 1999	(N)	Saudi Arabia	2–1	Friendly	Griffiths 43', Fuller 62'		
15 July 1999	(N)	Saudi Arabia	0–4	Friendly			
7 August 1999	(A)	Ghana	1–2	Friendly	Graham 11'		
2 September 1999	(A)	Canada	0–1	Friendly		8568	
8 September 1999	(H)	United States	2–2	Friendly	Davis 14' pen., Johnson 79'	20000	
24 October 1999	(A)	Cayman Islands	4–1	Friendly	Graham 8', English 41', 48', Johnson 88'	4031	
