= 1998 FIFA World Cup qualification – CONCACAF third round =

FIFA World Cup qualification

The third round of CONCACAF matches for 1998 FIFA World Cup qualification was played from August 30, 1996, to December 21, 1996.

== Format ==
A total of 12 teams (six teams given a bye to the third round and the six winners from the second round) were divided into three groups of four teams each. In each group, teams played against each other home-and-away in a round-robin format for a total of six matches per team. The top two teams of each group (three group winners and three runners-up) advanced to the fourth round (also called the 'Hexagonal' or 'Hex').

== Qualified teams ==
Teams with a bye to the third round:

- Canada
- Costa Rica
- El Salvador
- Honduras
- Mexico
- United States

Second round winners:

- Cuba
- Guatemala
- Jamaica
- Panama
- Saint Vincent and the Grenadines
- Trinidad and Tobago

== Group 1 ==
Pos	Team	Pld	W	D	L	GF	GA	GD	Pts	Qualification	United States men's national soccer team	Costa Rica national football team	Guatemala national football team	Trinidad and Tobago national football team
1	United States	6	4	1	1	10	5	+5	13	Advanced to the fourth round	—	2–1	2–0	2–0
2	Costa Rica	6	4	0	2	9	5	+4	12	Advanced to the fourth round	2–1	—	3–0	2–1
3	Guatemala	6	2	2	2	6	9	−3	8		2–2	1–0	—	2–1
4	Trinidad and Tobago	6	0	1	5	3	9	−6	1		0–1	0–1	1–1	—

September 1, 1996

Trinidad and Tobago	0–1	Costa Rica
	Report	Gómez 54'

Hasely Crawford Stadium, Port of Spain
Attendance: 25,000
Referee: Oscar Bardalez (Honduras)

October 6, 1996

Trinidad and Tobago	1–1	Guatemala
Nixon 37'	Report	Ramírez 22'

Hasely Crawford Stadium, Port of Spain
Attendance: 20,000
Referee: Mark Forde (Barbados)

November 3, 1996

United States	2–0	Guatemala
Wynalda 54'; McBride 90'	Report

RFK Stadium, Washington DC
Attendance: 30,082
Referee: Charles Barrett (Jamaica)

November 10, 1996

United States	2–0	Trinidad and Tobago
Dooley 53'; Wynalda 84'	Report

University of Richmond Stadium, Richmond
Attendance: 19,312
Referee: Arturo Brizio Carter (Mexico)
November 10, 1996

Costa Rica	3–0	Guatemala
Delgado 53'; Medford 74'; Gómez 78'	Report

Estadio Ricardo Saprissa Aymá, San José
Attendance: 17,000
Referee: Argelio Sabillon (Honduras)

November 24, 1996

Trinidad and Tobago	0–1	United States
	Report	Moore 36'

Hasely Crawford Stadium, Port of Spain
Attendance: 4,000
Referee: Mark Forde (Barbados)
November 24, 1996

Guatemala	1–0	Costa Rica
Plata 34'	Report

Memorial Coliseum, Los Angeles (United States) (Note: Guatemala played their home matches in Los Angeles and San Salvador after FIFA prevented international matches from being held at Estadio Mateo Flores in Guatemala City following the disaster on October 16, 1996, in which over 80 people died due to structural flaws and overcrowding.)
Attendance: 22,697
Referee: Rafael Rodriguez (El Salvador)

December 1, 1996

Costa Rica	2–1	United States
Wanchope 39'; López 84'	Report	Jones 90'

Estadio Ricardo Saprissa Aymá, San José
Attendance: 18,000
Referee: Peter Prendergast (Jamaica)

December 8, 1996

Guatemala	2–1	Trinidad and Tobago
Rodas 26', 67'	Report	Eve 30'

Memorial Coliseum, Los Angeles (United States)
Attendance: 24,728
Referee: William Laidlaw (Canada)

December 14, 1996

United States	2–1	Costa Rica
McBride 16'; Lassiter 60'	Report	Gómez 74'

Stanford Stadium, Palo Alto
Attendance: 40,527
Referee: León Padro Borja (Mexico)

December 21, 1996

Costa Rica	2–1	Trinidad and Tobago
Wanchope 44', 60'	Report	Nixon 7'

Estadio José Rafael Fello Meza Ivankovich, Cartago, Costa Rica
Attendance: 0
Referee: Pascual Rebolledo Cárdenas (Mexico)
December 21, 1996

Guatemala	2–2	United States
Funes 9'; Plata 44'	Report	Preki 7'; Hejduk 48'

Estadio Cuscatlán, San Salvador (El Salvador)
Attendance: 7,106
Referee: Mike Seifert (Canada)

== Group 2 ==
Pos	Team	Pld	W	D	L	GF	GA	GD	Pts	Qualification	Canada men's national soccer team	El Salvador national football team	Panama national football team	Cuba national football team
1	Canada	6	5	1	0	10	1	+9	16	Advanced to the fourth round	—	1–0	3–1	2–0
2	El Salvador	6	3	1	2	12	6	+6	10	Advanced to the fourth round	0–2	—	3–2	3–0
3	Panama	6	1	2	3	8	11	−3	5		0–0	1–1	—	3–1
4	Cuba	6	1	0	5	4	16	−12	3		0–2	0–5	3–1	—

August 30, 1996

Canada	3–1	Panama
Aunger 40'; Peschisolido 42'; Corazzin 87'	Report	Dely Valdés 49'

Commonwealth Stadium, Edmonton
Attendance: 5,255
Referee: Jose Emiliano Ramirez Suazo (Honduras)

September 8, 1996

Cuba	0–5	El Salvador
	Report	Rivera 22', 80'; Díaz Arce 49', 72'; Cienfuegos 83'

Estadio Cuscatlán, San Salvador (El Salvador)
Attendance: 32,000
Referee: Gerardo Enrique Mejia Centeno (Honduras)

September 22, 1996

Cuba	3–1	Panama
Sebrango 42', 70'; Bobadilla 88'	Report	Dely Valdés 55'

Estadio Rommel Fernández, Panama City (Panama)
Attendance: 15,000
Referee: Olger Mejias Ovares (Costa Rica)

October 6, 1996

Panama	1–1	El Salvador
Cubillas 43'	Report	Díaz Arce 51'

Estadio Rommel Fernández, Panama City
Attendance: 8,500
Referee: Vanroy Burnes (Antigua and Barbuda)
October 10, 1996

Canada	2–0	Cuba
Bunbury 29'; Peschisolido 53'	Report

Commonwealth Stadium, Edmonton
Attendance: 6,000
Referee: Ramesh Ramdhan (Trinidad and Tobago)

October 13, 1996

Cuba	0–2	Canada
	Report	Peschisolido 15'; Dasovic 79'

Commonwealth Stadium, Edmonton (Canada)
Attendance: 10,000
Referee: Carlos Mendizabal Euceda (Guatemala)

October 27, 1996

Panama	0–0	Canada
	Report

Estadio Rommel Fernández, Panama City
Attendance: 7,388
Referee: Carlos Batres (Guatemala)

November 3, 1996

Canada	1–0	El Salvador
Bunbury 65'	Report

Swangard Stadium, Burnaby
Attendance: 6,858
Referee: Ronald Gutiérrez (Costa Rica)

November 10, 1996

El Salvador	3–2	Panama
Díaz Arce 43'; Iraheta 68'; Trigueros 88'	Report	Dely Valdés 11', 86'

Estadio Cuscatlán, San Salvador
Attendance: 25,832
Referee: Zimmerman Boulos (United States)

December 1, 1996

El Salvador	3–0	Cuba
Renderos 3'; Díaz Arce 30'; Rodríguez 49'	Report

Estadio Cuscatlán, San Salvador
Attendance: 23,510
Referee: Arturo Angeles (United States)

December 15, 1996

Panama	3–1	Cuba
Mendieta 15'; Guevara 55'; Dely Valdés 58'	Report	Moré 67'

Estadio Rommel Fernandez, Panama City
Attendance: 0
Referee: Wayne Caesar (Trinidad and Tobago)
December 15, 1996

El Salvador	0–2	Canada
	Report	Watson 62'; Bunbury 66'

Estadio Cuscatlan, San Salvador
Attendance: 15,233
Referee: Brizio Carter (Mexico)

== Group 3 ==
Pos	Team	Pld	W	D	L	GF	GA	GD	Pts	Qualification	Jamaica national football team	Mexico national football team	Honduras national football team	Saint Vincent and the Grenadines national football team
1	Jamaica	6	4	1	1	12	3	+9	13	Advanced to the fourth round	—	1–0	3–0	5–0
2	Mexico	6	4	0	2	14	6	+8	12	Advanced to the fourth round	2–1	—	3–1	5–1
3	Honduras	6	3	1	2	18	11	+7	10		0–0	2–1	—	11–3
4	Saint Vincent and the Grenadines	6	0	0	6	6	30	−24	0		1–2	0–3	1–4	—

September 15, 1996

Jamaica	3–0	Honduras
Boyd 14', 53'; Whitmore 42'	Report

Independence Park, Kingston
Attendance: 21,000
Referee: Ramón Luis Méndez Vega (Costa Rica)
September 15, 1996

Saint Vincent and the Grenadines	0–3	Mexico
	Report	Peláez 15', 51'; Álvarez 89'

Arnos Vale Stadium, Kingstown
Attendance: 1,600
Referee: Rafael Rodriguez Medina (El Salvador)

September 21, 1996

Honduras	2–1	Mexico
Pavón 50'; Bennett 82' (pen.)	Report	Ramírez 63'

Estadio Francisco Morazán, San Pedro Sula
Attendance: 19,120
Referee: Raul Dominguez (United States)
September 23, 1996

Saint Vincent and the Grenadines	1–2	Jamaica
Harry 82' (pen.)	Report	Young 20', 41'

Arnos Vale Stadium, Kingstown
Attendance: 4,000
Referee: George Richenel Cameron (Suriname)

October 13, 1996

Saint Vincent and the Grenadines	1–4	Honduras
Chewitt 62'	Report	Suazo 7', 62'; Santamaria 23', 42'

Arnos Vale Stadium, Kingstown
Attendance: 2,200
Referee: Jose Farias (Canada)
October 16, 1996

Mexico	2–1	Jamaica
Zague 44'; Hermosillo 55'	Report	Boyd 70'

Estadio Azteca, Mexico City
Attendance: 110,000
Referee: Ramesh Ramdhan (Trinidad and Tobago)

October 27, 1996

Honduras	0–0	Jamaica
	Report

Estadio Francisco Morazán, San Pedro Sula
Attendance: 20,928
Referee: Raul Dominguez (United States)
October 30, 1996

Mexico	5–1	Saint Vincent and the Grenadines
Galindo 20', 29'; Zague 48'; Hermosillo 70'; Walker 88' (o.g.)	Report	Velox 88'

Estadio Azteca, Mexico City
Attendance: 27,000
Referee: René Parra (Canada)

November 6, 1996

Mexico	3–1	Honduras
Galindo 32'; Hermosillo 35'; Zague 45'	Report	Reneau 69'

Estadio Azteca, Mexico City
Attendance: 105,000
Referee: Rodrigo Badilla (Costa Rica)
November 10, 1996

Jamaica	5–0	Saint Vincent and the Grenadines
Whitmore 10', 13'; Young 64'; Cargill 66'; Malcolm 84'	Report

Independence Park, Kingston
Attendance: 30,000
Referee: Tim Weyland (United States)

November 17, 1996

Jamaica	1–0	Mexico
Goodison 82'	Report

Independence Park, Kingston
Attendance: 32,000
Referee: Mario Efrain Escobar López (Guatemala)
November 17, 1996

Honduras	11–3	Saint Vincent and the Grenadines
Zapata 3'; Suazo 11', 38', 50'; Cruz 19'; Pavón 30'; Reneau 48'; Membreño 65'; Núñez 67', 84'; Bennett 77' (pen.)	Report	Jack 37'; Guy 62'; Sam 75'

Estadio Francisco Morazán, San Pedro Sula
Attendance: 4,378
Referee: Victor Hugo Rodriguez Ugalde (Costa Rica)

== Goalscorers ==
There were 112 goals scored in 36 matches, for an average of 3.11 goals per match.

5 goals

- (El Salvador national football team) Raúl Díaz Arce
- (Honduras national football team) Nicolás Suazo
- (Panama national football team) Julio Dely Valdés

3 goals

- (Canada men's national soccer team) Alex Bunbury
- (Canada men's national soccer team) Paul Peschisolido
- (Costa Rica national football team) Rónald Gómez
- (Costa Rica national football team) Paulo Wanchope
- (Jamaica national football team) Walter Boyd
- (Jamaica national football team) Theodore Whitmore
- (Jamaica national football team) Paul Young
- (Mexico national football team) Benjamín Galindo
- (Mexico national football team) Carlos Hermosillo
- (Mexico national football team) Zague

2 goals

- (Cuba national football team) Eduardo Sebrango
- (El Salvador national football team) Guillermo Rivera
- (Guatemala national football team) Juan Carlos Plata
- (Guatemala national football team) Julio Rodas
- (Honduras national football team) Eduardo Bennett
- (Honduras national football team) Milton Núñez
- (Honduras national football team) Carlos Pavón
- (Honduras national football team) Enrique Reneau
- (Honduras national football team) Christian Santamaria
- (Mexico national football team) Ricardo Peláez
- (Trinidad and Tobago national football team) Jerren Nixon
- (United States men's national soccer team) Brian McBride
- (United States men's national soccer team) Eric Wynalda

1 goal

- (Canada men's national soccer team) Geoff Aunger
- (Canada men's national soccer team) Carlo Corazzin
- (Canada men's national soccer team) Nick Dasovic
- (Canada men's national soccer team) Mark Watson
- (Costa Rica national football team) Javier Delgado
- (Costa Rica national football team) Wílmer López
- (Costa Rica national football team) Hernan Medford
- (Cuba national football team) Manuel Bobadilla
- (Cuba national football team) Lester Moré
- (El Salvador national football team) Mauricio Cienfuegos
- (El Salvador national football team) Wilfredo Iraheta
- (El Salvador national football team) William Renderos
- (El Salvador national football team) Jorge Rodríguez
- (El Salvador national football team) Giovanni Trigueros
- (Guatemala national football team) Juan Manuel Funes
- (Guatemala national football team) Rudy Ramírez
- (Honduras national football team) Arnold Cruz
- (Honduras national football team) Merlyn Membreño
- (Honduras national football team) Barrios Zapata
- (Jamaica national football team) Peter Cargill
- (Jamaica national football team) Ian Goodison
- (Jamaica national football team) Stephen Malcolm
- (Mexico national football team) Damián Ariel Álvarez
- (Mexico national football team) Ramón Ramírez
- (Panama national football team) Juan Carlos Cubillas
- (Panama national football team) Rubén Guevara
- (Panama national football team) Víctor René Mendieta
- (Saint Vincent and the Grenadines national football team) James Chewitt
- (Saint Vincent and the Grenadines national football team) Alwyn Guy
- (Saint Vincent and the Grenadines national football team) Christopher Harry
- (Saint Vincent and the Grenadines national football team) Rodney Jack
- (Saint Vincent and the Grenadines national football team) Everad Sam
- (Saint Vincent and the Grenadines national football team) Kendall Velox
- (Trinidad and Tobago national football team) Angus Eve
- (United States men's national soccer team) Thomas Dooley
- (United States men's national soccer team) Frankie Hejduk
- (United States men's national soccer team) Cobi Jones
- (United States men's national soccer team) Roy Lassiter
- (United States men's national soccer team) Joe-Max Moore
- (United States men's national soccer team) Preki

1 own goal

- (Saint Vincent and the Grenadines national football team) Dexter Walker (against Mexico)
