= Standing-room only =

Designation for event with no seats available

An event is described as standing-room only when it is so well-attended that all of the chairs in the venue are occupied, leaving only flat spaces of pavement or flooring for other attendees to stand, at least those spaces not restricted by occupancy by fire codes for ingress/egress of crowds. Some venues issue standing-room-only (or SRO) tickets for a reduced cost since it can become uncomfortable to stand through the course of an event. However, some fans prefer standing-room-only tickets, as the crowds that gather can be more active than people who are sitting down for much of the event.

For example, standing-room-only areas known as terraces are very common at football matches around the globe and tickets sold as standing area tickets are sometimes the most popular; i.e., they are not sold merely when all seating tickets have been sold out. However, the periodic occurrence of tragedies related to standing room only areas at football matches such as at Hillsborough and Guatemala City have led to calls to eliminate such arrangements. In England, standing room, once a staple of most football stadiums there, has been practically eliminated at the highest level; all the major stadiums have been refurbished as all-seaters. There is a now move towards the provision of safe standing areas, providing bolt-on, fold-away or rail seats.

By contrast, standing room tickets are rare at major sports stadiums in the United States and Canada, with only the Dallas Cowboys' AT&T Stadium, the Philadelphia Eagles' Lincoln Financial Field, the Hamilton Tiger-Cats' Tim Hortons Field, and Buffalo Bills Highmark Stadium having such permanent arrangements, though they are usually marketed as part of a 'party deck' where the price of a ticket may come with food and drink along with obstructed picnic table-style seating, and with other amenities to encourage fans to purchase those tickets. The Green Bay Packers have also tested out the standing room concept in 2014 in a select section after the completion of renovations at Lambeau Field. The Little League World Series uses standing room and berm seating at its events, with its flagship venue, Howard J. Lamade Stadium, able to accommodate 12 times as many spectators on its berms (over 40,000) than it does in the 3,300-seat ballpark proper.

Standing tickets are a key feature of the annual London concert season The Proms, with up to 1,350 "Promenaders" buying cheaper tickets to stand in unreserved space in the arena and gallery of the Royal Albert Hall.
