= 1998 FIFA World Cup qualification (CONCACAF) =

Tournament details
- Dates: March 24th 1996 – November 16th 1997
- Teams: 28 (Note: Bahamas and Bermuda withdrew before playing any matches.) (from 1 confederation)

Tournament statistics
- Matches played: 98
- Goals scored: 295 (3.01 per match)
- Attendance: 2,065,454 (21,076 per match)
- Top scorer(s): (Mexico) Carlos Hermosillo (11 Goals)

The 1998 FIFA World Cup qualification, CONCACAF zone ran from March 1996 to November 1997 in order to determine the three CONCACAF representatives at the 1998 FIFA World Cup. For an overview of the qualification rounds, see 1998 FIFA World Cup qualification.

A total of 30 CONCACAF teams entered the competition. Mexico, the USA, Costa Rica, Honduras, El Salvador and Canada, the six highest-ranked teams according to FIFA, received byes and advanced to the third round directly. The remaining 24 teams were divided into two zones, based on geographical locations.

== Format ==
- Caribbean Zone: The 20 teams played in three rounds of knockout matches on a home-and-away basis to determine four winners advancing to the third round. Bahamas and Bermuda withdrew before playing one game. 18 countries stay in the race.
- Central American Zone: The four teams were paired up to play knockout matches on a home-and-away basis. The winners would advance to the third round.

In the third round, the 12 teams were divided into three groups of four teams each. They played against each other on a home-and-away basis. The group winners and runners-up would advance to the final round.

In the final round, the six teams played against each other on a home-and-away basis. The top three teams would qualify.

== Preliminary round ==
Team 1	Agg.	Team 2	1st leg	2nd leg
Dominican Republic	6–3	Aruba	3–2	3–1
Guyana	1–8	Grenada	1–2	0–6
Saint Kitts and Nevis	w/o	Bahamas	—	—
Dominica	6–4	Antigua and Barbuda	3–3	3–1

Group A

March 24, 1996

Dominican Republic	3–2	Aruba
Rodríguez 28'; Mariano 50'; Peña 73'	Report	Davelaar 60'; Malmberg 84'

Estadio Olímpico Félix Sánchez, Santo Domingo
Attendance: 5,000
Referee: Timothy Joseph (Saint Lucia)
March 31, 1996

Aruba	1–3	Dominican Republic
Davelaar 38' (pen.)	Report	Rodríguez 5' (pen.); Aquino 62'; Queliz 87'

Trinidad Stadium, Oranjestad
Attendance: 1,137
Referee: Gilberto Alcalá Pineda (Mexico)

Dominican Republic won 6–3 on aggregate and advanced to the first round.

Group B

March 29, 1996

Guyana	1–2	Grenada
Joseph 13'	Report	Charles 54'; Roberts 63'

Bourda Cricket Ground, Georgetown
Attendance: 1,000
Referee: Christiaan Eiloof (Suriname)
April 7, 1996

Grenada	6–0	Guyana
Charles 33'; François 40', 47'; Fletcher 48', 71', 82'	Report

Grenada National Stadium, Saint George's
Attendance: 4,000
Referee: Billy Doctrove (Dominica)

Grenada won 8–1 on aggregate and advanced to the first round.

Group C

The Bahamas withdrew, so Saint Kitts and Nevis advanced to the first round automatically.

Group D

March 10, 1996

Dominica	3–3	Antigua and Barbuda
Dominique 8'; Dangler 42'; Marshall 89'	Report	Clarke 15'; Edwards 28', 75'

Windsor Park, Roseau
Attendance: 4,500
Referee: Mark Forde (Barbados)
March 31, 1996

Antigua and Barbuda	1–3	Dominica
Edwards 59'	Report	Greenaway 23'; Morancie 60'; Edmond 66'

Antigua Recreation Ground, St. John's
Attendance: 900
Referee: Evaroy Babb (Guyana)

Dominica won 6–4 on aggregate and advanced to the first round.

== First round ==
Team 1	Agg.	Team 2	1st leg	2nd leg
Dominican Republic	2–1	Netherlands Antilles	2–1	0–0
Haiti	7–1	Grenada	6–1	1–0
Cayman Islands	0–6	Cuba	0–1	0–5
Saint Kitts and Nevis	6–1	Saint Lucia	5–1	1–0
Puerto Rico	1–9	Saint Vincent and the Grenadines	1–2	0–7
Dominica	0–2	Barbados	0–1	0–1
Suriname	0–2	Jamaica	0–1	0–1
Trinidad and Tobago	w/o	Bermuda	—	—

Group 1

May 4, 1996

Dominican Republic	2–1	Netherlands Antilles
Jiménez 35'; Zapata 68'	Report	Gersley 40'

Estadio Olímpico Félix Sánchez, Santo Domingo
Attendance: 2,000
Referee: Victorino Rodríguez Portillo (El Salvador)
May 11, 1996

Netherlands Antilles	0–0	Dominican Republic
	Report

Ergilio Hato Stadium, Willemstad
Attendance: 1,111
Referee: Carlos Mendizabal Euceda (Guatemala)

Dominican Republic won 2–1 on aggregate and advanced to the second round.

Group 2

May 12, 1996

Haiti	6–1	Grenada
Chevalier 11'; Pierre 35', 58'; Chauvet 62', 64', 73'	Report	Modeste 85'

Stade Capois, Cap Haitien
Attendance: 5,500
Referee: Robin Murray (Trinidad and Tobago)
May 18, 1996

Grenada	0–1	Haiti
	Report	Pierre 49'

Queen's Park (Grenada), St. George's
Attendance: 1,200
Referee: Victor Moore (Barbados)

Haiti won 7–1 on aggregate and advanced to the second round.

Group 3

May 12, 1996

Cayman Islands	0–1	Cuba
	Report	Darcourt 10'

Truman Bodden, George Town
Attendance: 2,000
Referee: Argelio Sabillon (Honduras)
May 14, 1996

Cuba	5–0	Cayman Islands
Cruzata 19'; Sebrango 63'; Darcourt 68', 81'; Moré 83'	Report

Truman Bodden, George Town (Cayman Islands)
Attendance: 1,200
Referee: Pascual Rebolledo Cárdenas (Mexico)

Cuba won 6–0 on aggregate and advanced to the second round.

Group 4

May 5, 1996

Saint Kitts and Nevis	5–1	Saint Lucia
Kelley 5', 86'; Sargeant 22', 44'; Gumbs 41'	Report	Jean 51'

Warner Park, Basseterre
Attendance: 1,500
Referee: Robin Murray (Trinidad and Tobago)
May 19, 1996

Saint Lucia	0–1	Saint Kitts and Nevis
	Report	Kelley 50'

Mindoo Philip Park, Castries
Attendance: 500
Referee: Harry Leocadio Davelaar (Antigua and Barbuda)

Saint Kitts and Nevis won 6–1 on aggregate and advanced to the second round.

Group 5

May 4, 1996

Puerto Rico	1–2	Saint Vincent and the Grenadines
Lugris 70' (pen.)	Report	Huggins 18'; Hinds 58'

Estadio Efrain Carcayo Alicea, Bayamón
Attendance: 200
Referee: Manuel Villar (Aruba)
May 12, 1996

Saint Vincent and the Grenadines	7–0	Puerto Rico
Jack 3', 13', 25'; Mussenden 35' (o.g.); Hinds 37', 59'; Charles 64'	Report

Amos Vale Stadium, Kingstown
Attendance: 2,000
Referee: Lancelotte Livingston (Jamaica)

Saint Vincent and the Grenadines won 9-1 on aggregate and advanced to the second round.

Group 6

May 14, 1996

Dominica	0–1	Barbados
	Report	Proverbs 63'

Windsor Park, Roseau
Attendance: 3,000
Referee: Charles Barrett (Jamaica)
May 19, 1996

Barbados	1–0	Dominica
Goodridge 67'	Report

Barbados National Stadium, Bridgetown
Attendance: 2,500
Referee: Austin Eric Harewood (Trinidad and Tobago)

Barbados won 2–0 on aggregate and advanced to the second round.

Group 7

March 31, 1996

Suriname	0–1	Jamaica
	Report	Whitmore 56'

Flora Stadion, Paramaribo
Attendance: 2,500
Referee: Vanroy Burnes (Antigua and Barbuda)
April 21, 1996

Jamaica	1–0	Suriname
P. Davis 73'	Report

Independence Park, Kingston
Attendance: 6,100
Referee: Ronald Gutíerrez Castro (Costa Rica)

Jamaica won 2–0 on aggregate and advanced to the second round.

Group 8

Bermuda withdrew, so Trinidad and Tobago advanced to the second round automatically.

== Second round ==
Team 1	Agg.	Team 2	1st leg	2nd leg
Caribbean Zone
Cuba	7–2	Haiti	6–1	1–1
Dominican Republic	1–12	Trinidad and Tobago	1–4	0–8
Barbados	0–3	Jamaica	0–1	0–2
Saint Kitts and Nevis	2–2 (a)	Saint Vincent and the Grenadines	2–2	0–0
Central American Zone
Nicaragua	1–3	Guatemala	0–1	1–2
Belize	2–6	Panama	1–2	1–4

=== Caribbean Zone ===
Group A

June 23, 1996

Cuba	6–1	Haiti
Sebrango 18'; Pedraza 44'; Darcourt 61', 70', 71'; Moré 81'	Report	R. Pierre 84'

Hasely Crawford Stadium, Port of Spain (Trinidad and Tobago)
Attendance: 2,000
Referee: Mario Efrain Escobar (Guatemala)
June 30, 1996

Haiti	1–1	Cuba
Chauvet 21'	Report	Cruz 79' (pen.)

Stade Capois, Cap Haitien
Attendance: 4,500
Referee: Ramon Luis Mendez Vega (Costa Rica)

Cuba won 7–2 on aggregate and advanced to the third round.

Group B

June 15, 1996

Dominican Republic	1–4	Trinidad and Tobago
Jiménez 59'	Report	Latapy 37', 67'; Aquino 39' (o.g.); Eve 84'

Estadio Olímpico, Santo Domingo
Attendance: 1,500
Referee: Arturo Brizio Carter (Mexico)
June 23, 1996

Trinidad and Tobago	8–0	Dominican Republic
John 1', 23', 80'; Yorke 8'; Eve 16', 42'; Rougier 19'; Latapy 89'	Report

Queen's Park Oval, Port of Spain
Attendance: 8,000
Referee: Rodrigo Badilla (Costa Rica)

Trinidad and Tobago won 12–1 on aggregate and advanced to the third round.

Group C

June 23, 1996

Barbados	0–1	Jamaica
	Report	Boyd 90'

Barbados National Stadium, Bridgetown
Attendance: 5,000
Referee: Arturo Angeles (United States)
June 30, 1996

Jamaica	2–0	Barbados
Whitmore 23'; Boyd 72'	Report

Independence Park, Kingston
Attendance: 15,000
Referee: Ramesh Ramdhan (Trinidad and Tobago)

Jamaica won 3–0 on aggregate and advanced to the third round.

Group D

June 23, 1996

Saint Kitts and Nevis	2–2	Saint Vincent and the Grenadines
Gumbs 38'; Bedford 88'	Report	Hinds 12'; Velox 35'

Warner Park, Basseterre
Attendance: 3,000
Referee: Mark Forde (Barbados)
June 30, 1996

Saint Vincent and the Grenadines	0–0	Saint Kitts and Nevis
	Report

Amos Vale Stadium, Kingstown
Attendance: 2,500
Referee: Peter Prendergast (Jamaica)

2–2 on aggregate. Saint Vincent and the Grenadines won on the away goals rule and advanced to the third round.

=== Central American Zone ===
Group E

May 5, 1996

Nicaragua	0–1	Guatemala
	Report	Plata 27'

Estadio Cacique Diriangén, Diriamba
Attendance: 2,500
Referee: Tim Wayland (United States)
May 10, 1996

Guatemala	2–1	Nicaragua
Plata 62', 67'	Report	Jerez 87'

Guatemala City
Attendance: 25,000
Referee: Dino Bucci (Canada)

Guatemala won 3–1 on aggregate and advanced to the third round.

Group F

June 2, 1996

Belize	1–2	Panama
McCaulay 28'	Report	Guevara 57'; Dely Valdés 61'

National Stadium, Belize City
Attendance: 2,000
Referee: Rafael Rodriguez Medina (El Salvador)
June 9, 1996

Panama	4–1	Belize
Dely Valdés 14', 46', 61'; Mendieta 88'	Report	Casey 60'

Estadio Rommel Fernández, Panama City
Attendance: 17,500
Referee: Donald Campos (Nicaragua)

Panama won 6-2 on aggregate and advanced to the third round.

== Third round ==
=== Group 1 ===
Pos	Team	Pld	W	D	L	GF	GA	GD	Pts	Qualification	United States men's national soccer team	Costa Rica national football team	Guatemala national football team	Trinidad and Tobago national football team
1	United States	6	4	1	1	10	5	+5	13	Advanced to the fourth round	—	2–1	2–0	2–0
2	Costa Rica	6	4	0	2	9	5	+4	12	Advanced to the fourth round	2–1	—	3–0	2–1
3	Guatemala	6	2	2	2	6	9	−3	8		2–2	1–0	—	2–1
4	Trinidad and Tobago	6	0	1	5	3	9	−6	1		0–1	0–1	1–1	—

=== Group 2 ===
Pos	Team	Pld	W	D	L	GF	GA	GD	Pts	Qualification	Canada men's national soccer team	El Salvador national football team	Panama national football team	Cuba national football team
1	Canada	6	5	1	0	10	1	+9	16	Advanced to the fourth round	—	1–0	3–1	2–0
2	El Salvador	6	3	1	2	12	6	+6	10	Advanced to the fourth round	0–2	—	3–2	3–0
3	Panama	6	1	2	3	8	11	−3	5		0–0	1–1	—	3–1
4	Cuba	6	1	0	5	4	16	−12	3		0–2	0–5	3–1	—

=== Group 3 ===
Pos	Team	Pld	W	D	L	GF	GA	GD	Pts	Qualification	Jamaica national football team	Mexico national football team	Honduras national football team	Saint Vincent and the Grenadines national football team
1	Jamaica	6	4	1	1	12	3	+9	13	Advanced to the fourth round	—	1–0	3–0	5–0
2	Mexico	6	4	0	2	14	6	+8	12	Advanced to the fourth round	2–1	—	3–1	5–1
3	Honduras	6	3	1	2	18	11	+7	10		0–0	2–1	—	11–3
4	Saint Vincent and the Grenadines	6	0	0	6	6	30	−24	0		1–2	0–3	1–4	—

== Fourth round ==
Pos	Team	Pld	W	D	L	GF	GA	GD	Pts	Qualification	Mexico	United States	Jamaica	Costa Rica	El Salvador	Canada
1	Mexico	10	4	6	0	23	7	+16	18	Qualification to 1998 FIFA World Cup	—	0–0	6–0	3–3	5–0	4–0
2	United States	10	4	5	1	17	9	+8	17	Qualification to 1998 FIFA World Cup	2–2	—	1–1	1–0	4–2	3–0
3	Jamaica	10	3	5	2	7	12	−5	14	Qualification to 1998 FIFA World Cup	0–0	0–0	—	1–0	1–0	1–0
4	Costa Rica	10	3	3	4	13	12	+1	12		0–0	3–2	3–1	—	0–0	3–1
5	El Salvador	10	2	4	4	11	16	−5	10		0–1	1–1	2–2	2–1	—	4–1
6	Canada	10	1	3	6	5	20	−15	6		2–2	0–3	0–0	1–0	0–0	—

Source: FIFA
Rules for classification: Qualification tiebreakers

== Qualified teams ==
The following three teams from CONCACAF qualified for the final tournament.

Team	Qualified as	Qualified on	Previous appearances in FIFA World Cup^{1}
Mexico	Fourth round winners	12 October 1997	10 (1930, 1950, 1954, 1958, 1962, 1966, 1970, 1978, 1986, 1994)
United States	Fourth round runners-up	9 November 1997	5 (1930, 1934, 1950, 1990, 1994)
Jamaica	Fourth round third place	16 November 1997	0 (debut)

^{1} Bold indicates champions for that year. Italic indicates hosts for that year.

== Goalscorers ==
There were 295 goals scored in 98 matches, for an average of 3.01 goals per match.

11 goals

- (Mexico national football team) Carlos Hermosillo

9 goals

- (El Salvador national football team) Raúl Díaz Arce
- (Panama national football team) Julio Dely Valdés

8 goals

- (Mexico national football team) Benjamín Galindo

6 goals

- (Costa Rica national football team) Paulo Wanchope
- (Cuba national football team) Lázaro Darcourt

5 goals

- (Canada men's national soccer team) Alex Bunbury
- (Guatemala national football team) Juan Carlos Plata
- (Honduras national football team) Nicolás Suazo
- (Jamaica national football team) Walter Boyd
- (Jamaica national football team) Theodore Whitmore
- (Mexico national football team) Zague
- (United States men's national soccer team) Eric Wynalda

4 goals

- (Costa Rica national football team) Rónald Gómez
- (Cuba national football team) Eduardo Sebrango
- (Haiti national football team) Isaac Chauvet
- (Jamaica national football team) Deon Burton
- (Saint Vincent and the Grenadines national football team) Andre Hinds
- (Saint Vincent and the Grenadines national football team) Rodney Jack
- (Trinidad and Tobago national football team) Angus Eve
- (United States men's national soccer team) Brian McBride

3 goals

- (Antigua and Barbuda national football team) Derrick Edwards
- (Canada men's national soccer team) Paul Peschisolido
- (Costa Rica national football team) Hernan Medford
- (Cuba national football team) Lester Moré
- (El Salvador national football team) Nildeson
- (Grenada national football team) Keith Fletcher
- (Haiti national football team) Golman Pierre
- (Jamaica national football team) Paul Young
- (Saint Kitts and Nevis national football team) Dwight Allers Kelley
- (Trinidad and Tobago national football team) Stern John
- (Trinidad and Tobago national football team) Russell Latapy
- (United States men's national soccer team) Roy Lassiter

2 goals

- (Aruba national football team) Raymond Davelaar
- (Canada men's national soccer team) Carlo Corazzin
- (Dominican Republic national football team) Alberto Jiménez
- (Dominican Republic national football team) Dinardo Rodríguez
- (El Salvador national football team) Mauricio Cienfuegos
- (El Salvador national football team) William Renderos
- (El Salvador national football team) Guillermo Rivera
- (Grenada national football team) Ricky Charles
- (Grenada national football team) Jason François
- (Guatemala national football team) Julio Rodas
- (Honduras national football team) Eduardo Bennett
- (Honduras national football team) Milton Núñez
- (Honduras national football team) Carlos Pavón
- (Honduras national football team) Enrique Reneau
- (Honduras national football team) Christian Santamaria
- (Jamaica national football team) Andy Williams
- (Mexico national football team) Luis García
- (Mexico national football team) Luis Hernández
- (Mexico national football team) Ricardo Peláez
- (Panama national football team) Rubén Guevara
- (Panama national football team) Víctor René Mendieta
- (Saint Kitts and Nevis national football team) Keith Gumbs
- (Saint Kitts and Nevis national football team) Vernon Sargeant
- (Saint Vincent and the Grenadines national football team) Kendall Velox
- (Trinidad and Tobago national football team) Jerren Nixon
- (United States men's national soccer team) Eddie Pope
- (United States men's national soccer team) Preki
- (United States men's national soccer team) Roy Wegerle

1 goal

- (Antigua and Barbuda national football team) Quentin Clarke
- (Aruba national football team) Ryan Malmberg
- (Barbados national football team) Gregory Goodridge
- (Barbados national football team) Roger Proverbs
- (Belize national football team) Denmark Casey
- (Belize national football team) David McCaulay
- (Canada men's national soccer team) Geoff Aunger
- (Canada men's national soccer team) Eddy Berdusco
- (Canada men's national soccer team) Nick Dasovic
- (Canada men's national soccer team) Carl Fletcher
- (Canada men's national soccer team) Mark Watson
- (Costa Rica national football team) Luis Diego Arnáez
- (Costa Rica national football team) Javier Delgado
- (Costa Rica national football team) Farlen Ilama
- (Costa Rica national football team) Wílmer López
- (Costa Rica national football team) Luis Marín
- (Costa Rica national football team) Allan Oviedo
- (Costa Rica national football team) Richard Smith
- (Costa Rica national football team) Mauricio Solís
- (Costa Rica national football team) Jafet Soto
- (Cuba national football team) Manuel Bobadilla
- (Cuba national football team) Armando Cruz
- (Cuba national football team) Alexander Cruzata
- (Cuba national football team) Mario Pedraza
- (Dominica national football team) George Dangler
- (Dominica national football team) Anthony Dominique
- (Dominica national football team) Jeffrey Edmond
- (Dominica national football team) Peter Greenaway
- (Dominica national football team) Shane Marshall
- (Dominica national football team) Stevenson Morancie
- (Dominican Republic national football team) Pedro Aquino
- (Dominican Republic national football team) Ramón Mariano
- (Dominican Republic national football team) Nelson Peña
- (Dominican Republic national football team) Cristian Queliz
- (Dominican Republic national football team) Omar Zapata
- (El Salvador national football team) Waldir Guerra
- (El Salvador national football team) Wilfredo Iraheta
- (El Salvador national football team) Elías Montes
- (El Salvador national football team) Jorge Rodríguez
- (El Salvador national football team) Giovanni Trigueros
- (Grenada national football team) Patrick Modeste
- (Grenada national football team) Otis Roberts
- (Guatemala national football team) Juan Manuel Funes
- (Guatemala national football team) Rudy Ramírez
- (Guyana national football team) Bryan Joseph
- (Haiti national football team) Wilson Chevalier
- (Haiti national football team) Rosemond Pierre
- (Honduras national football team) Arnold Cruz
- (Honduras national football team) Merlyn Membreño
- (Honduras national football team) Barrios Zapata
- (Jamaica national football team) Peter Cargill
- (Jamaica national football team) Paul Davis
- (Jamaica national football team) Ian Goodison
- (Jamaica national football team) Paul Hall
- (Jamaica national football team) Stephen Malcolm
- (Mexico national football team) Enrique Alfaro
- (Mexico national football team) Damián Ariel Álvarez
- (Mexico national football team) Paulo César Chávez
- (Mexico national football team) Joaquín del Olmo
- (Mexico national football team) Alberto García
- (Mexico national football team) Ramón Ramírez
- (Netherlands Antilles national football team) Gijsberta Gersley
- (Nicaragua national football team) Ezequiel Jerez
- (Panama national football team) Juan Carlos Cubillas
- (Puerto Rico national football team) Marcos Lugris
- (Saint Kitts and Nevis national football team) Larrymore Bedford
- (Saint Lucia national football team) Earl Jean
- (Saint Vincent and the Grenadines national football team) Wesley Charles
- (Saint Vincent and the Grenadines national football team) James Chewitt
- (Saint Vincent and the Grenadines national football team) Alwyn Guy
- (Saint Vincent and the Grenadines national football team) Christopher Harry
- (Saint Vincent and the Grenadines national football team) Marlos Huggins
- (Saint Vincent and the Grenadines national football team) Everad Sam
- (Trinidad and Tobago national football team) Anthony Rougier
- (Trinidad and Tobago national football team) Dwight Yorke
- (United States men's national soccer team) Thomas Dooley
- (United States men's national soccer team) Frankie Hejduk
- (United States men's national soccer team) Chris Henderson
- (United States men's national soccer team) Cobi Jones
- (United States men's national soccer team) Joe-Max Moore
- (United States men's national soccer team) Tab Ramos
- (United States men's national soccer team) Claudio Reyna
- (United States men's national soccer team) Earnie Stewart

1 own goal

- (Dominican Republic national football team) Pedro Aquino (against Trinidad and Tobago)
- (Mexico national football team) Nicolás Ramírez (against the United States)
- (Puerto Rico national football team) Angel Mussenden (against Saint Vincent and the Grenadines)
- (Saint Vincent and the Grenadines national football team) Dexter Walker (against Mexico)
