= Mario Pedraza =

Cuban footballer

Personal information
- Full name: Mario Pedraza Abreu
- Date of birth: July 18, 1973 (age 53)
- Place of birth: Cruces, Cuba
- Position: Defender

Senior career*
Years	Team	Apps	(Gls)
1994–2008	Cienfuegos		
1998–1999	→ Bonner SC (loan)	1	(1)

International career^{‡}
1995–2005	Cuba	49	(1)
- * Club domestic league appearances and goals ‡ National team caps and goals as of 1 April 2018

Mario Pedraza Abreu (born 18 July 1973) is a Cuban retired footballer.

== Club career ==
He played his entire career for his provincial team Cienfuegos, except for half a season in Germany with Bonner SC, when then Cuban leader Fidel Castro approved for the whole Cuban team to join the German 4th level side for part of the 1998/99 season.

== International career ==
Pedraza made his international debut for Cuba in 1995 and has earned a total of 49 caps, scoring 1 goal. He represented his country in 16 FIFA World Cup qualification matches (1 goal) and played at 2 CONCACAF Gold Cup final tournaments.

His final international was a February 2005 Gold Cup qualifier against Jamaica.

=== International goals ===
Scores and results list Cuba's goal tally first.

Number	Date	Location	Opponent	Score	Result	Competition
1	10 June 1996	Truman Bodden Sports Complex, George Town, Cayman Islands	Haiti	2-0	6-1	1998 FIFA World Cup qualification
2	9 March 2000	Estadio Pedro Marrero, Havana, Cuba	Nicaragua	3-0	4-0	Friendly match
