= Caribbean Footballer of the Year =

The Caribbean Footballer of the Year is an award given to Caribbean players who have had the most successful playing season.

== Winners ==
Year	Player	Nationality	Source
1993	David Nakhid	Trinidad and Tobago	
1995	Arnold Dwarika	Trinidad and Tobago	
1996	Jerren Nixon	Trinidad and Tobago	
1998	Theodore Whitmore	Jamaica	
2003	David Nakhid	Trinidad and Tobago	
2007	Shalrie Joseph	Grenada	
