= Dean Sewell =

Jamaican footballer (born 1972)

Personal information
- Full name: Dean Sewell
- Date of birth: 13 April 1972 (age 54)
- Place of birth: Kingston, Jamaica
- Height: 1.78 m (5 ft 10 in)
- Positions: Defender; midfielder

Youth career
- 1994–1996: New Hampshire College

Senior career*
Years	Team	Apps	(Gls)
–1995	Constant Spring		
1995–1997	New Hampshire Phantoms	53	(40)
1997–1999	Constant Spring		
1999–2000	Charleston Battery	49	(13)
2001–2002	Connecticut Wolves	40	(9)

International career^{‡}
1993–2000	Jamaica	44	(5)
- * Club domestic league appearances and goals as of 22 April 2011 ‡ National team caps and goals as of 22 April 2011

Dean Sewell (born 13 April 1972) is a Jamaican former footballer.

== Playing career ==
Nicknamed 'Two Face', he played for several clubs in the United States, including Charleston Battery and Connecticut Wolves. He also played college soccer at New Hampshire College (now Southern New Hampshire University). In Jamaica, he played for Constant Spring, where he also started his career.

== International career ==
Sewell played his international football for his country of origin, Jamaica, and was a participant at the 1998 FIFA World Cup. He made his debut in 1993 and played his last international in 2000 against the Cayman Islands, earning over 20 caps for the Reggae Boyz.

=== International goals ===
Scores and results list Jamaica's goal tally first.

No	Date	Venue	Opponent	Score	Result	Competition
1.	27 February 1997	Independence Park, Kingston, Jamaica	Bermuda	3–1	3–2	1997 Caribbean Cup qualification
2.	4 May 1997	Trinidad Stadium, Oranjestad, Aruba	Aruba	?–0	6–0	1997 Caribbean Cup qualification
3.	31 August 1997	Independence Park, Kingston, Jamaica	Trinidad and Tobago	1–0	6–1	Friendly
4.	26 October 1997	Antigua Recreation Ground, St. John's, Antigua and Barbuda	Antigua and Barbuda	3–0	3–0	Friendly
5.	31 July 1998	Hasely Crawford Stadium, Port of Spain, Trinidad and Tobago	Trinidad and Tobago	2–0	2–1	1997 Caribbean Cup
