= Ricky Charles =

Grenadian footballer (born 1975)

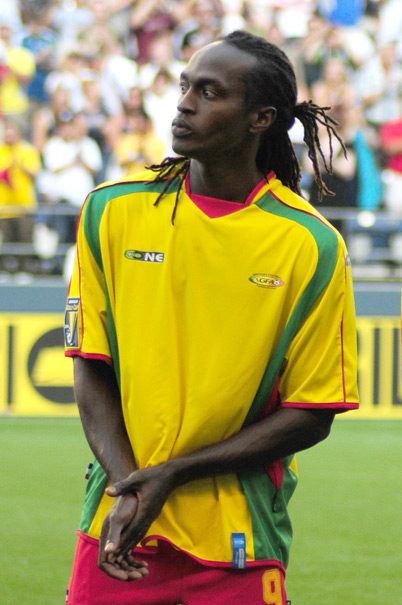
- Charles with Grenada in 2009

Personal information
- Date of birth: 19 June 1975 (age 51)
- Place of birth: St. George's, Grenada
- Position: Midfielder

Youth career
- Bryant & Stratton Bobcats
- 2003–2004: USC Spartanburg Rifles

Senior career*
Years	Team	Apps	(Gls)
2005–2006	New Hampshire Phantoms	24	(4)
2007	Brooklyn Knights	12	(7)
2008	St. Ann's Rangers		(3)
2009–2013	QPR St. George's		
2013–2014	Old Road		
2016–2019	QPR St. George's		

International career
1995–2011	Grenada	71	(37)
Medal record
Men's football
Representing Grenada
Caribbean Cup
Runner-up	2008 Jamaica
- * Club domestic league appearances and goals

Ricky Charles (born 16 June 1975) is a Grenadian retired footballer who played as a midfielder. He played for the Grenada national team and is his nation's top scorer with 37 goals.

== Club career ==
Charles played university soccer at Bryant & Stratton College and the University of South Carolina Spartanburg, and was inducted into the National Junior College Athletic Association Hall of Fame. He then played for the New Hampshire Phantoms and Brooklyn Knights, before playing for St. Ann's Rangers in the TT Pro League.

He had a trial with Football League First Division side West Bromwich Albion in summer 1997 but was not offered a contract.

== International career ==
Charles scored one goal at the 1995 Caribbean Cup, four goals at the 2001 Caribbean Nations Cup and two goals at the 2005 Caribbean Cup, He has also scored eight goals in twelve qualifying matches for various FIFA World Cups.

== Career statistics ==
Scores and results list Grenada's goal tally first, score column indicates score after each Charles goal.

List of international goals scored by Ricky Charles
No.	Date	Venue	Opponent	Score	Result	Competition
1	21 March 1995	Grenada National Stadium, St. George's, Grenada	Saint Lucia	2–0	2–0	1995 Caribbean Cup
2	29 March 1996	Bourda Cricket Ground, Georgetown, Guyana	Guyana	1–1	2–1	1998 FIFA World Cup qualification
3	7 April 1996	Grenada National Stadium, St. George's, Grenada	Guyana	1–0	6–0	1998 FIFA World Cup qualification
4	4 April 1997	Hasely Crawford Stadium, Port of Spain, Trinidad and Tobago	Guyana	1–1	5–1	1997 Caribbean Cup qualification
5	4 July 1997	Antigua Recreation Ground, St. John's, Antigua and Barbuda	Jamaica	1–0	1–1	1997 Caribbean Cup
6	15 April 1998	Antigua Recreation Ground, St. John's, Antigua and Barbuda	Anguilla	4–0	14–1	1998 Caribbean Cup qualification
7	15 April 1998	Antigua Recreation Ground, St. John's, Antigua and Barbuda	Anguilla	5–0	14–1	1998 Caribbean Cup qualification
8	15 April 1998	Antigua Recreation Ground, St. John's, Antigua and Barbuda	Anguilla	7–0	14–1	1998 Caribbean Cup qualification
9	15 April 1998	Antigua Recreation Ground, St. John's, Antigua and Barbuda	Anguilla	13–0	14–1	1998 Caribbean Cup qualification
10	12 March 2001	Grenada National Stadium, St. George's, Grenada	Dominica	8–3	8–3	2001 Windward Islands Tournament
11	12 March 2001	Grenada National Stadium, St. George's, Grenada	Dominica	8–3	8–3	2001 Windward Islands Tournament
12	14 March 2001	Grenada National Stadium, St. George's, Grenada	Saint Lucia	4–3	4–3	2001 Windward Islands Tournament
13	4 April 2001	André Kamperveen Stadion, Paramaribo, Suriname	Barbados	1–1	1–2	2001 Caribbean Cup qualification
14	6 April 2001	André Kamperveen Stadion, Paramaribo, Suriname	Aruba	2–0	4–2	2001 Caribbean Cup qualification
15	6 April 2001	André Kamperveen Stadion, Paramaribo, Suriname	Aruba	3–0	4–2	2001 Caribbean Cup qualification
16	6 April 2001	André Kamperveen Stadion, Paramaribo, Suriname	Aruba	4–0	4–2	2001 Caribbean Cup qualification
17	6 July 2002	Grenada National Stadium, St. George's, Grenada	Saint Martin	5–2	8–3	2003 CONCACAF Gold Cup qualification
18	30 July 2002	Grenada National Stadium, St. George's, Grenada	Taiwan	5–2	5–2	Friendly
19	4 August 2002	Stade Alberic Richards, Sandy Ground, Saint Martin	Saint Martin	5–0	7–1	2003 CONCACAF Gold Cup qualification
20	4 August 2002	Stade Alberic Richards, Sandy Ground, Saint Martin	Saint Martin	6–0	7–1	2003 CONCACAF Gold Cup qualification
21	4 August 2002	Stade Alberic Richards, Sandy Ground, Saint Martin	Saint Martin	7–0	7–1	2003 CONCACAF Gold Cup qualification
22	14 March 2004	Blairmont Community Centre, Blairmont, Guyana	Guyana	1–0	3–1	2006 FIFA World Cup qualification
23	20 June 2004	Grenada National Stadium, St. George's, Grenada	United States	1–1	2–3	2006 FIFA World Cup qualification
24	20 November 2004	Grenada National Stadium, St. George's, Grenada	Saint Vincent and the Grenadines	2–0	3–2	Friendly
25	20 November 2004	Grenada National Stadium, St. George's, Grenada	Saint Vincent and the Grenadines	3–2	3–2	Friendly
26	24 November 2004	Marvin Lee Stadium, Macoya, Trinidad and Tobago	Suriname	1–1	2–2	2005 Caribbean Cup
27	28 November 2004	Marvin Lee Stadium, Macoya, Trinidad and Tobago	Puerto Rico	2–0	5–2	2005 Caribbean Cup
28	26 March 2008	Grenada National Stadium, St. George's, Grenada	U.S. Virgin Islands	3–0	10–0	2010 World Cup qualification
29	26 March 2008	Grenada National Stadium, St. George's, Grenada	U.S. Virgin Islands	5–0	10–0	2010 World Cup qualification
30	26 March 2008	Grenada National Stadium, St. George's, Grenada	U.S. Virgin Islands	7–0	10–0	2010 World Cup qualification
31	26 March 2008	Grenada National Stadium, St. George's, Grenada	U.S. Virgin Islands	9–0	10–0	2010 World Cup qualification
32	13 October 2008	Stade René Serge Nabajoth, Les Abymes, Guadeloupe	Guadeloupe	1–0	1–2	2008 Caribbean Cup qualification
33	15 October 2008	Stade René Serge Nabajoth, Les Abymes, Guadeloupe	Cayman Islands	3–1	4–2	2008 Caribbean Cup qualification
34	3 December 2008	Independence Park, Kingston, Jamaica	Trinidad and Tobago	2–1	2–1	2008 Caribbean Cup
35	11 December 2008	Independence Park, Kingston, Jamaica	Cuba	1–0	2–2	2008 Caribbean Cup
36	28 June 2009	Grenada National Stadium, St. George's, Grenada	Antigua and Barbuda	1–0	2–2	Friendly
37	22 October 2010	Grenada National Stadium, St. George's, Grenada	Puerto Rico	3–0	3–1	2010 Caribbean Cup qualification

== Honours ==
Grenada

- Caribbean Cup: runner-up 2008
