= Peter Cargill =

Jamaican footballer (1964-2005)

Personal information
- Full name: Peter Raymond Cargill
- Date of birth: 2 March 1964
- Place of birth: Saint Ann Parish, Jamaica
- Date of death: 15 April 2005 (aged 41)
- Place of death: Saint Ann Parish, Jamaica
- Height: 1.73 m (5 ft 8 in)
- Position: Midfielder

Youth career
- 1982: Camperdown High School

Senior career*
Years	Team	Apps	(Gls)
1982–1984	Harbour View		
1984–1985	Swallowfield		
1985–1986	CC Lions		
1986–1987	Hazard United		
1987–1994	Maccabi Netanya	196	(4)
1994–1995	Hapoel Petah Tikva	27	(0)
1996–1999	Harbour View		

International career
1984–1998	Jamaica	84	(3)

Managerial career
- 2000–2004: Jamaica (assistant manager)
- 2004–2005: Waterhouse F.C.
- * Club domestic league appearances and goals

Peter Raymond Cargill (2 March 1964 – 15 April 2005) was a Jamaican international football player. His position was midfielder or defender. His cousin is WWE Superstar Jade Cargill.

== Club career ==
Nicknamed "Jair", he started his footballing career at high school, winning the Triple Crown as a captain with Camperdown High School. Cargill also played for local sides Swallowfield FC, CC Lions, Hazard United and Harbour View and also spent 8 years in Israel with Maccabi Netanya and Hapoel Petah Tikva. The versatile player returned to Jamaica in 1996 and was called up to the Jamaica team.

== International career ==
He captained the Reggae Boyz and was a participant at the 1998 FIFA World Cup in France. He collected a total of 84 caps and scored three goals.

== Personal life ==
After retiring as a player, he became Reggae Boyz' assistant head coach until 2004. Then he coached Jamaica National Premier League side Waterhouse F.C.

Like his World Cup team-mate Stephen Malcolm and Jamaican legend Winston Anglin, Cargill was killed in a road accident. He died of severe injuries in Saint Ann Parish while on his way to a football match against Wadadah in Montego Bay when the minivan he was travelling in overturned and struck a boulder head-on.

Cargill was the cousin of Jade Cargill, a professional wrestler.

== International goals ==
#	Date	Venue	Opponent	Score	Result	Competition
1	21 June 1992	Guaracara Park, Pointe-à-Pierre, Trinidad and Tobago	Saint Vincent and the Grenadines	1–0	2–0	1992 Caribbean Cup
2	10 November 1996	Independence Park, Kingston, Jamaica	Saint Vincent and the Grenadines	4–0	5–0	1998 FIFA World Cup qualification
3	29 June 1997	Independence Park, Kingston, Jamaica	Cuba	2–0	3–0	Friendly
Correct as of 8 March 2016

== Honours ==
- Israeli Premier League:
  - Runner-up (1): 1987–88
- Toto Cup:
  - Runner-up (1): 1988–89
- Caribbean Cup:
  - Winner (2): 1991, 1998
- JFF Champions Cup:
  - Winner (1): 1998
