= Alexánder Cruzata =

Cuban footballer (born 1974)

Alexander Cruzata
Personal information
- Full name: Alexander Cruzata Rojas
- Date of birth: July 26, 1974 (age 52)
- Place of birth: Cueto, Cuba
- Position: Defender

Senior career*
Years	Team	Apps	(Gls)
1993–2008	Holguín		

International career^{‡}
1996–2005	Cuba	74	(2)
- * Club domestic league appearances and goals ‡ National team caps and goals as of 1 January 2018

Alexander Cruzata Rojas (born 26 July 1974) is a Cuban retired footballer.

== Club career ==
Born in Cueto, Holguín Province, Cruzata played his entire career for his provincial team Holguín.

== International career ==
Cruzata made his international debut for Cuba in 1996 and has earned a total of 74 caps, scoring 2 goals. He represented his country in 18 FIFA World Cup qualification matches (1 goal) and played at 4 CONCACAF Gold Cup final tournaments.

His final international appearance was in a 2005 CONCACAF Gold Cup group match unsuccessfully contesting Canada.

=== International goals ===
Scores and results list Cuba's goal tally first.

Number	Date	Location	Opponent	Score	Result	Competition
1	14 May 1996	Truman Bodden Sports Complex, George Town, Cayman Islands	Cayman Islands	1-0	5-0	1998 FIFA World Cup qualification
2	8 April 2001	Bourda, Georgetown, Guyana	Guyana	1-0	3-0	2001 Caribbean Cup qualification
