= 1991 Caribbean Cup =

Shell Caribbean Cup

Tournament details
- Host country: Jamaica
- Dates: 23 May – 2 June 1991
- Teams: 8

Final positions
- Champions: Jamaica (1st title)
- Runners-up: Trinidad and Tobago
- Third place: Saint Lucia
- Fourth place: Guyana

Tournament statistics
- Matches played: 13
- Goals scored: 43 (3.31 per match)

The 1991 Caribbean Cup, known as the Shell Caribbean Cup for sponsorship reasons, was the ninth international association football championship for members of the Caribbean Football Union (CFU). It was the third edition of the Caribbean Cup which replaced the CFU Championship. Hosted by Jamaica, the competition ran from 23 May – 2 June 1991 and was contested by the national teams of Cayman Islands, Cuba, Dominican Republic, Guyana, Jamaica, Martinique, Saint Lucia and Trinidad and Tobago. For the first time, the competition was used as part of the qualification process for the CONCACAF Gold Cup.

The final tournament began with the first matches in the group stage on 32 May 1991 and ended with the final on 2 June 1991. Jamaica defeated Trinidad and Tobago 2–0 in the final to win the competition for the first time. Both finalists qualified for the 1991 CONCACAF Gold Cup.

== Background ==
The Caribbean Football Union (CFU) was founded in January 1978 as a sub-confederation of the Confederation of North, Central America and Caribbean Association Football (CONCACAF). Later the same year, the first CFU Championship was organised in Trinidad and Tobago. The competition was held semi-regularly until the final edition in 1988. From 1989, it was replaced by the Caribbean Cup.

The tournament was sponsored by Royal Dutch Shell following the input of employees of Shell Antilles and Gulanas Ltd.

The previous edition was unfinished as a result of the Jamaat al Muslimeen coup attempt and Tropical Storm Arthur so Trinidad and Tobago were the defending champions after winning the inaugural edition in Barbados.

== Format ==
A qualifying tournament was held to determine five of the eight teams that would participate in the final tournament. Hosts Jamaica and holders Trinidad and Tobago qualified automatically. Cuba received a bye. The 15 competing teams were drawn into five groups of three teams. Each group was played as a single round-robin where each team would play all of the others once. The winner of each group would qualify for the final tournament.

For the final tournament, the eight teams were drawn into two groups of four teams. Each group was played as a single round-robin where each team would play all of the others once. The winners and runners-up of each group would contest the semi-finals with the winners advancing to the final and the losers contesting the third-place play-off. The two finalists would qualify for the 1991 CONCACAF Gold Cup.

=== Participants ===
- Anguilla
- British Virgin Islands
- Cayman Islands
- Dominica
- French Guiana
- Guadeloupe
- Guyana
- Jamaica
- Haiti
- Martinique
- Montserrat
- Netherlands Antilles
- Puerto Rico
- Saint Kitts and Nevis
- Saint Lucia
- Trinidad and Tobago

== Qualifying tournament ==
=== Group 1 ===
Qualifying group 1, held in the Dominican Republic, was played between 10 and 14 May 1991. The Dominican Republic qualified as group winners on goal difference after defeating Puerto Rico 3–1 in their final match.

==== Table ====
Pos	Team	Pld	W	D	L	GF	GA	GD	Pts	Qualification
1	Dominican Republic	2	1	1	0	4	2	+2	3	Qualification for 1991 Caribbean Cup
2	Haiti	2	1	1	0	4	3	+1	3	
3	Puerto Rico	2	0	0	2	3	6	−3	0	

==== Results ====
10 May 1991

Puerto Rico	2–3	Haiti

Estadio Olímpico Juan Pablo Duarte, Santo Domingo

12 May 1991

Dominican Republic	1–1	Haiti

Estadio Olímpico Juan Pablo Duarte, Santo Domingo

14 May 1991

Dominican Republic	3–1	Puerto Rico

Estadio Olímpico Juan Pablo Duarte, Santo Domingo

=== Group 2 ===
Qualifying group 2, held in Martinique, was played between 15 and 19 May 1991. All three teams ended the round-robin with a record of one win and one defeat. Martinique qualified on goal difference.

==== Table ====
Pos	Team	Pld	W	D	L	GF	GA	GD	Pts	Qualification
1	Martinique	2	1	0	1	4	3	+1	2	Qualification for 1991 Caribbean Cup
2	French Guiana	2	1	0	1	2	2	0	2	
3	Guadeloupe	2	1	0	1	2	3	−1	2	

==== Results ====
15 May 1991

Martinique	1–2	French Guiana

Stade d'Honneur de Dillon

17 May 1991

Guadeloupe	1–0	French Guiana

Stade d'Honneur de Dillon

19 May 1991

Martinique	3–1	Guadeloupe

Stade d'Honneur de Dillon

=== Group 3 ===
Cuba received a bye to the final tournament.

=== Group 4 ===
Qualifying group 4, held in the Saint Kitts and Nevis, was played between 10 and 14 May 1991. The Cayman Islands qualified as group winners after Saint Kitts and Nevis drew with the British Virgin Islands in the final match.

==== Table ====
Pos	Team	Pld	W	D	L	GF	GA	GD	Pts	Qualification
1	Cayman Islands	2	1	1	0	3	1	+2	3	Qualification for 1991 Caribbean Cup
2	Saint Kitts and Nevis	2	0	2	0	1	1	0	2	
3	British Virgin Islands	2	0	1	1	0	2	−2	1	

==== Results ====
10 May 1991

Cayman Islands	2–0	British Virgin Islands
Ebanks 15'; Bush 22'	Report	Goal

Warner Park, Basseterre

12 May 1991

Saint Kitts and Nevis	1–1	Cayman Islands
Chapman 31'	Report	Bush 26'

Warner Park, Basseterre

14 May 1991

Saint Kitts and Nevis	0–0	British Virgin Islands

Warner Park, Basseterre

=== Group 5 ===
Qualifying group 5, held in Guyana, was played between 8 and 12 May 1991. Guyana qualified as group winners on goal difference after a 1–1 draw with Suriname in their final match.

==== Table ====
Pos	Team	Pld	W	D	L	GF	GA	GD	Pts	Qualification
1	Guyana	2	1	1	0	5	1	+4	3	Qualification for 1991 Caribbean Cup
2	Suriname	2	1	1	0	2	1	+1	3	
3	Aruba	2	0	0	2	0	5	−5	0	

==== Results ====
8 May 1991

Suriname	1–0	Aruba

Bourda, Georgetown

10 May 1991

Guyana	4–0	Aruba
Stanton (x2); Barnwell; Bailey

Bourda, Georgetown

12 May 1991

Guyana	1–1	Suriname
Stanton		Godliep

Bourda, Georgetown

=== Group 6 ===
Qualifying group 4, held in Saint Lucia, was played between 12 and 16 May 1991. Saint Lucia qualified as group winners after defeating Anguilla 6–0 in their final match.

==== Table ====
Pos	Team	Pld	W	D	L	GF	GA	GD	Pts	Qualification
1	Saint Lucia	2	2	0	0	9	0	+9	4	Qualification for 1991 Caribbean Cup
2	Montserrat	2	0	1	1	1	4	−3	1	
3	Anguilla	2	0	1	1	1	7	−6	1	

==== Results ====
10 May 1991

Saint Lucia	3–0	Montserrat

Mindoo Phillip Park, Castries

14 May 1991

Montserrat	1–1	Anguilla

Mindoo Phillip Park, Castries

16 May 1991

Saint Lucia	6–0	Anguilla

Mindoo Phillip Park, Castries

== Final tournament ==
Cuba withdrew from the final tournament.

=== Group stage ===
==== Group A ====
In group A, Jamaica advanced to the semi-finals as group winners after winning both their matches. Guyana also advanced as runners-up after defeating the Cayman Islands 2–1 in their final match.

===== Table =====
Pos	Team	Pld	W	D	L	GF	GA	GD	Pts	Qualification
1	Jamaica	2	2	0	0	9	2	+7	4	Advance to knockout stage
2	Guyana	2	1	0	1	2	7	−5	2	Advance to knockout stage
3	Cayman Islands	2	0	0	2	3	5	−2	0	
4	Cuba	0	0	0	0	0	0	0	0	Withdrew

===== Results =====
24 May 1991

Jamaica	6–0	Guyana
Palmer 4'; Davis 14', 48'; Reid 63'; Gaynor 74'; Boyd 86'

National Stadium, Kingston

26 May 1991

Jamaica	3–2	Cayman Islands
Davis 2', 47'; Long 89'		Ramoon 38'; Parchement 80'

National Stadium, Kingston

28 May 1991

Guyana	2–1	Cayman Islands
Massiah 29', 89'		Williams 30'

National Stadium, Kingston

==== Group B ====
In group B, Trinidad and Tobago advanced to the semi-finals as group winners. Saint Lucia also advanced as runners-up after defeating Trinidad and Tobago 2–1 in their final match.

===== Table =====
Pos	Team	Pld	W	D	L	GF	GA	GD	Pts	Qualification
1	Trinidad and Tobago	3	2	0	1	9	2	+7	4	Advance to knockout stage
2	Saint Lucia	3	1	2	0	2	1	+1	4	Advance to knockout stage
3	Martinique	3	1	1	1	4	2	+2	3	
4	Dominican Republic	3	0	1	2	1	11	−10	1	

===== Results =====
23 May 1991

Trinidad and Tobago	7–0	Dominican Republic
Latapy (x2); Lewis (x2); Skeene; Allen; Thomas

National Stadium, Kingston
23 May 1991

Saint Lucia	0–0	Martinique

National Stadium, Kingston

25 May 1991

Trinidad and Tobago	1–0	Martinique
Latapy

National Stadium, Kingston
25 May 1991

Saint Lucia	0–0	Dominican Republic

National Stadium, Kingston

27 May 1991

Trinidad and Tobago	1–2	Saint Lucia
Skeene		Cadette; Edmund

National Stadium, Kingston
27 May 1991

Martinique	4–1	Dominican Republic
Sophie 20'; Gertrude 36', 49'; Cadal 69'		Cruz 50'

National Stadium, Kingston

=== Knockout stage ===
Knockout phase
Team 1	Score	Team 2
Semi-finals
Trinidad and Tobago	3–1	Guyana
Jamaica	2–0	Saint Lucia
Third-place play-off
Saint Lucia	4–1	Guyana
Final
Jamaica	2–0	Trinidad and Tobago

==== Semi-finals ====
Group winners Trinidad and Tobago and Jamaica both advanced to the final after defeating Guyana and Saint Lucia respectively.

30 May 1991

Trinidad and Tobago	3–1	Guyana
Jones 2'; Latapy 4', 82'		Laing

National Stadium, Kingston
Attendance: 10,000

30 May 1991

Jamaica	2–0	Saint Lucia
Davis 18'; Reid 88'

National Stadium, Kingston

==== Third-place play-off ====
Goals from Philip Gilbert, Martin Alexander, Victorine Weeks and Earl Jean helped Saint Lucia to a 4–1 win to finish third.

2 Jun 1991

Guyana	1–4	Saint Lucia
Stanton		Gilbert; Alexander; Weeks; Jean

National Stadium, Kingston
Attendance: 27,000

==== Final ====
Goals from Paul Davis and Winston Anglin helped Jamaica to a 2–0 as they won the competition for the first time.

2 June 1991

Trinidad and Tobago	0–2	Jamaica
		Davis 6'; Anglin 49'

National Stadium, Kingston
Attendance: 27,000
