= Theodore Whitmore =

Jamaican footballer and manager (born 1972)

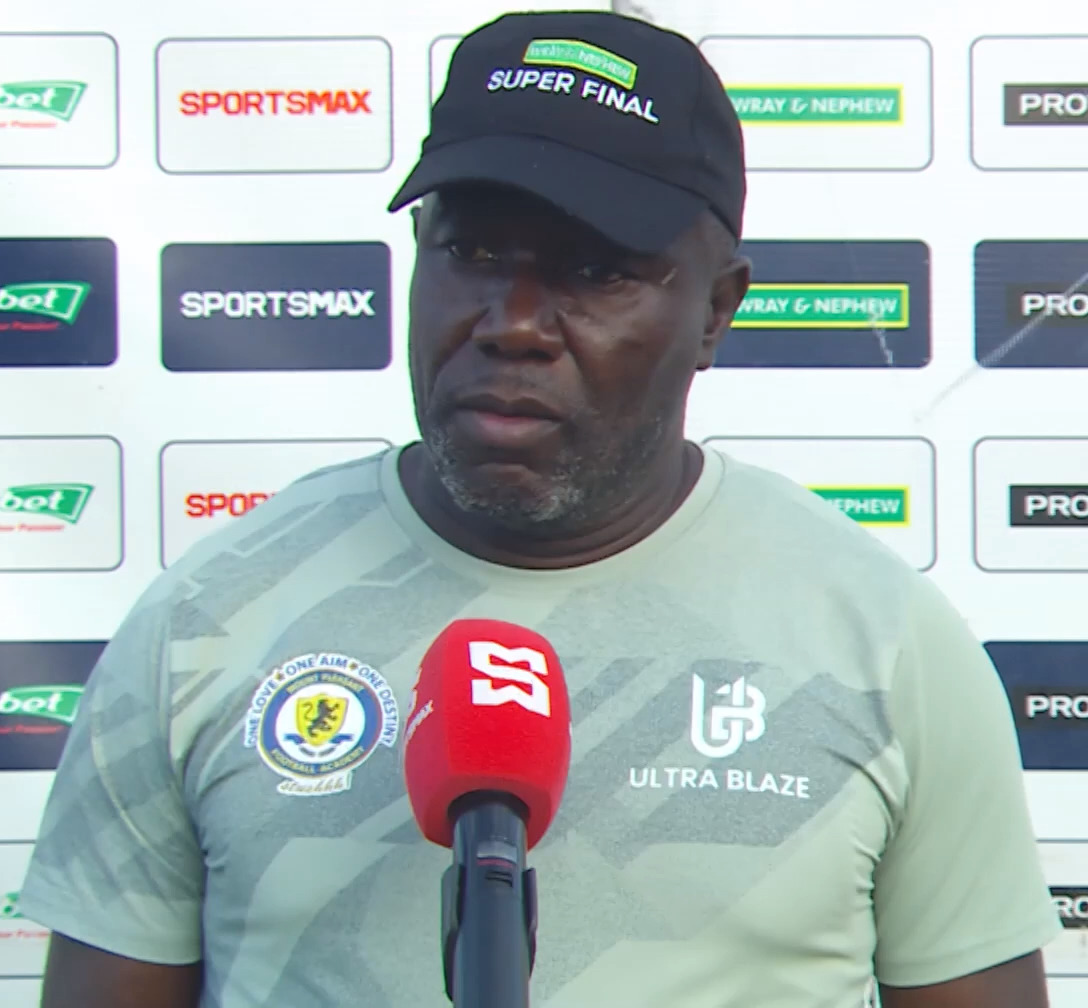
- Whitmore in 2025

Personal information
- Full name: Theodore Eccleston Whitmore
- Date of birth: 5 August 1972 (age 54)
- Place of birth: Montego Bay, Jamaica
- Height: 6 ft 2 in (1.88 m)
- Position: Midfielder

Team information
- Current team: Mount Pleasant F.A.

Youth career
- Montego Bay Boys Club

Senior career*
Years	Team	Apps	(Gls)
1994	Cape Town Spurs	3	(1)
1996–1997	Violet Kickers	12	(2)
1997–1999	Seba United	14	(1)
1999–2002	Hull City	77	(9)
2002–2003	Seba United	?	(4)
2003	Livingston	3	(0)
2003–2004	Seba United	?	(1)
2004–2006	Tranmere Rovers	37	(5)
2006	Seba United	24	(8)

International career
1993–2004	Jamaica	120	(24)

Managerial career
- 2006–2008: Seba United
- 2007: Jamaica (interim)
- 2008: Jamaica (assistant)
- 2008: Jamaica (interim)
- 2009–2013: Jamaica
- 2014–2015: Jamaica U-20
- 2016–2021: Jamaica
- 2022–2024: Mount Pleasant F.A.
- 2024–: Mount Pleasant F.A.
- * Club domestic league appearances and goals

Theodore Eccleston Whitmore, OD, (Born August 5, 1972) is a Jamaican former professional footballer. He is the former head coach of Jamaica national team.

== Club career ==
Whitmore attended St. James High School in Montego Bay, Jamaica. During his late teens, he worked as a Baked Goods delivery assistant with National Continental Foods, now National Baking Company, in Montego Bay before moving on to play football in the Jamaica National Premiere League. By default, he left his job at National Continental foods after the salesperson he worked for was terminated for stabbing a defenseless office employee in early 1992. As a very skillful and creative for a player despite his tall frame, he started his club career at Montego Bay Boys Club, and has since played for Violet Kickers and Seba United in his native Jamaica. He was signed on a free by English league side Hull City following a one-week trial with the club, where he played together with compatriot Ian Goodison, until an accident in Jamaica cut short his Hull career. Whitmore made his debut in an F.A. Cup tie against Macclesfield. On his league debut, away at Rochdale, Whitmore scored a league debut goal. During his 77 games for Hull, he became something of a fan favourite during a relatively unhappy time for the club; who were lurking in the basement of the English Football League, struggling with financial insecurities. Scottish team Livingston acquired his services in 2003, and in June 2004 he signed for Tranmere Rovers. He had his contract terminated in January 2006 by mutual consent. He returned to Jamaica to become player/coach for his former team Seba United.

== International career ==
Whitmore made his debut for Jamaica in a November 1993 friendly match against the United States, coming on as a late substitute for Hector Wright. Whitmore earned 105 official international caps and scored 23 goals for the Jamaica national team. He was a key member of the Reggae Boyz' squad during the second half of the 1990s, playing as a major catalyst for the Jamaicans as they advanced to their first and only World Cup in 1998. Although Jamaica was eliminated in the first round, Whitmore scored two goals in Jamaica's only win of the competition, a 2–1 victory against Japan. In that same year he was named Caribbean Footballer of the Year. His last international match was also against the United States, a 1–1 away draw on 17 November 2004 during 2006 World Cup qualification in which he was substituted for Jason Euell in the 72nd minute.

== Managerial career ==
=== Seba United ===
When Whitmore returned to Seba United in 2006, he returned as both a player and a coach.

=== Jamaica ===
In November 2007, he was brought on as interim manager of the Jamaica national team after the firing of former manager Bora Milutinović. Jamaica won both games, friendlies against El Salvador and Guatemala, under his watch. He was then retained as an assistant under new coach Renê Simões. Simões lasted nine months as manager due to poor play in the third round of CONCACAF World Cup qualifiers, and upon his release on 11 September 2008, he was again appointed interim manager until newly appointed manager John Barnes would be available in November.

As interim manager in October 2008, Whitmore guided the Reggae Boyz to back-to-back 1–0 wins against Mexico and Honduras that gained him tremendous support as a manager and put the Jamaicans into range for advancement with one game remaining in semifinal round group play. He again took the reins of the national team when John Barnes left the position in June 2009, to take up a management job at Whitmore's former club Tranmere Rovers in the English League. Whitmore's team struggled during the 2009 CONCACAF Gold Cup and were eliminated in the first round. As a part of the national team rebuilding efforts which started in August 2009, he led the squad to three draws and one win to end 2009. In December 2010, he led Jamaica to the 2010 Digicel Cup title. After qualifying Jamaica for the CONCACAF Hexagonal final round in 2012, Whitmore resigned as head coach in June 2013. From December 2014 through February 2015, he served as Jamaica national u20 coach. In September 2016, Whitmore was named interim head coach of Jamaica In May 2018, Whitmore signed a four-year contract with the JFF. On 9 December 2021, Whitmore was dismissed as senior national team head coach. by the JFF.

=== Mount Pleasant FA ===
In 2022, Whitmore was named manager of Jamaica Premier League club, Mount Pleasant in the St. Ann Parish of Jamaica. On 11 June 2023, he won his first domestic title as a manager.

After guiding the team to back-to-back JPL final appearances, winning in 2023 and losing on penalties in 2024, it was announced by Mount Pleasant that the club will not renew the contracts of its technical staff, including head coach Theodore Whitmore, upon their expiration on July 31, 2024. Whitmore made a stunning return to Mount Pleasant after just one competitive match, in which the club suffered a shock defeat in the opening game of the 2024 CONCACAF Caribbean Cup.

== Personal life ==
Whitmore was injured in a car accident that led to the death of Reggae Boyz' teammate Stephen Malcolm. After the accident he was charged with manslaughter, of which he was later acquitted. In November 2013, Whitmore's 14-year-old son, Jouvhaine, died after being struck by a vehicle while riding his bicycle. Whitmore's second son Gianni is said to be his twin because they look exactly alike and he is as skilful and talented as his father in his prime.

== Career statistics ==
=== International ===
Appearances and goals by national team and year
National team	Year	Apps	Goals
Jamaica	1993	1	0
Jamaica	1994	–	
Jamaica	1995	7	3
Jamaica	1996	12	5
Jamaica	1997	20	4
Jamaica	1998	13	4
Jamaica	1999	15	4
Jamaica	2000	14	2
Jamaica	2001	13	0
Jamaica	2002	2	0
Jamaica	2003	14	0
Jamaica	2004	9	1
Total		120	23

Scores and results list Jamaica's goal tally first, score column indicates score after each Whitemore goal.

List of international goals scored by Theodore Whitmore
No.	Date	Venue	Opponent	Score	Result	Competition
1	21 July 1995	Jarrett Park, Montego Bay, Jamaica	Cuba	1–0	1–2	1995 Caribbean Cup
2	23 July 1995	Independence Park, Kingston, Jamaica	Trinidad and Tobago	1–0	1–0	1995 Caribbean Cup
3	6 August 1995	Varsity Stadium, Toronto, Canada	Trinidad and Tobago	1–0	1–0	1995 Caribana Cup
4	31 March 1996	Dr. Ir. Franklin Essed Stadion, Paramaribo, Suriname	Suriname	1–0	1–0	1998 FIFA World Cup qualification
5	30 June 1996	Independence Park, Kingston, Jamaica	Barbados	1–0	2–0	1998 FIFA World Cup qualification
6	15 September 1996	Independence Park, Kingston, Jamaica	Honduras	2–0	3–0	1998 FIFA World Cup qualification
7	10 November 1996	Independence Park, Kingston, Jamaica	Saint Vincent and the Grenadines	1–0	5–0	1998 FIFA World Cup qualification
8	10 November 1996	Independence Park, Kingston, Jamaica	Saint Vincent and the Grenadines	2–0	5–0	1998 FIFA World Cup qualification
9	4 May 1997	Trinidad Stadium, Oranjestad, Aruba	Aruba	?–0	6–0	1997 Caribbean Cup qualification
10	4 May 1997	Trinidad Stadium, Oranjestad, Aruba	Aruba	?–0	6–0	1997 Caribbean Cup qualification
11	8 July 1997	Antigua Recreation Ground, St. John's, Antigua and Barbuda	Antigua and Barbuda	2–0	2–0	1997 Caribbean Cup
12	10 July 1997	Antigua Recreation Ground, St. John's, Antigua and Barbuda	Trinidad and Tobago	1–0	1–1 (2–4 p)	1997 Caribbean Cup
13	26 June 1998	Stade de Gerland, Lyon, France	Japan	1–0	2–1	1998 FIFA World Cup
14	26 June 1998	Stade de Gerland, Lyon, France	Japan	2–0	2–1	1998 FIFA World Cup
15	22 July 1998	Independence Park, Kingston, Jamaica	Cayman Islands	3–0	4–0	1998 Caribbean Cup
16	22 July 1998	Independence Park, Kingston, Jamaica	Cayman Islands	4–0	4–0	1998 Caribbean Cup
17	5 March 1999	Estadio Mateo Flores, Guatemala City, Guatemala	Paraguay	1–0	1–3	1999 Copa de la Paz
18	7 March 1999	Estadio Mateo Flores, Guatemala City, Guatemala	Guatemala	4–0	4–2	1999 Copa de la Paz
19	31 March 1999	Independence Park, Kingston, Jamaica	Paraguay	2–0	3–0	Friendly
20	9 May 1999	Independence Park, Kingston, Jamaica	South Africa	1–1	1–1	Friendly
21	16 January 2000	Tianhe Stadium, Guangzhou, China	New Zealand	1–1	2–1	2000 Four Nations Tournament
22	23 July 2000	Independence Park, Kingston, Jamaica	Honduras	1–1	3–1	2002 FIFA World Cup qualification
23	9 October 2004	Rommel Fernández Stadium, Panama City, Panama	Panama	1–1	1–1	2006 FIFA World Cup qualification

== Managerial statistics ==
As of matches played 16 November 2021

Managerial record by team and tenure
Team	From	To	Record								Ref
Team	From	To	G	W	D	L	GF	GA	GD	Win %	Ref
Seba United	16 August 2006	16 June 2008	39	13	7	19	48	64	−16	33.33	
Jamaica	11 November 2007	31 December 2007	2	2	0	0	5	0	+5	100.00	
Jamaica	11 September 2008	20 November 2008	2	2	0	0	2	0	+2	100.00	
Jamaica	9 June 2009	12 June 2013	53	24	8	21	62	51	+11	45.28	
Jamaica u20	26 February 2014	31 December 2015	5	0	2	3	2	7	−5	0.00	
Jamaica	26 September 2016	9 December 2021	54	23	14	17	89	63	+26	42.59	
Career total			155	64	31	60	208	185	+23	41.29	

== Honours ==
=== Player ===
Jamaica

- Caribbean Cup: 1998, 2005

Individual

- Caribbean Footballer of the Year: 1998
- CONCACAF Gold Cup Best XI (Reserves): 2003

=== Manager ===
Jamaica

- Caribbean Cup: 2008 (as assistant), 2010 (as manager)
- CONCACAF Gold Cup runners-up: 2017

Mount Pleasant FA

- Jamaica Premier League: 2022-23
- Caribean Cup 2025
- CFU Club Shield 2026

== See also ==
- List of men's footballers with 100 or more international caps
