= 1997 Caribbean Cup =

Shell/Umbro Caribbean Cup

Tournament details
- Host countries: Antigua and Barbuda; Saint Kitts and Nevis
- Dates: 4–13 July
- Teams: 6

Final positions
- Champions: Trinidad and Tobago (6th title)
- Runners-up: Saint Kitts and Nevis
- Third place: Jamaica
- Fourth place: Grenada

Tournament statistics
- Matches played: 10
- Goals scored: 30 (3 per match)

The 1997 Caribbean Cup, known as the Shell Caribbean Cup for sponsorship reasons, was the 15th international association football championship for members of the Caribbean Football Union (CFU). It was the ninth edition of the Caribbean Cup which replaced the CFU Championship. Hosted by Antigua and Barbuda and Saint Kitts and Nevis, the competition ran from 4–13 July 1997 and was contested by the national teams of Antigua and Barbuda, Grenada, Jamaica, Martinique, Saint Kitts and Nevis and Trinidad and Tobago.

The final tournament began with the first matches in the group stage on 4 July 1997 and ended with the final on 13 July 1997. Three-time defending champions Trinidad and Tobago defeated hosts Saint Kitts and Nevis 4–0 in the final to win the competition for the sixth time.

== Background ==
The Caribbean Football Union (CFU) was founded in January 1978 as a sub-confederation of the Confederation of North, Central America and Caribbean Association Football (CONCACAF). Later the same year, the first CFU Championship was organised in Trinidad and Tobago. The competition was held semi-regularly until the final edition in 1988. From 1989, it was replaced by the Caribbean Cup.

The tournament was sponsored by Royal Dutch Shell following the input of employees of Shell Antilles and Gulanas Ltd.

Trinidad and Tobago were three-time defending champions after winning the previous three editions in 1994, 1995 and 1996. Trinidad and Tobago were also the most successful team in the history of the competition after winning the trophy on five previous occasions.

== Format ==
A qualifying tournament was held to determine three of the six teams that would participate in the final tournament. Co-hosts Antigua and Barbuda and Saint Kitts and Nevis as well as holders Trinidad and Tobago qualified automatically. For the first stage, six qualifying groups were drawn. After withdrawals, groups two and six were played as two-legged ties in which the team that scored the most goals on aggregate advanced to the second stage. Group three was also played as a two-legged tie in which the team that scored the most goals on aggregate would advance to compete in group four. Groups one, four and five were played as a single round-robin where each team would play all of the others once. The winner of each group would advance to the second stage.

In the second stage, one of the five qualifying teams was given a bye to the final tournament. The four remaining teams were drawn to contest two two-legged ties in which the team that scored the most goals on aggregate qualified for the final tournament.

For the final tournament, the six teams were drawn into two groups of three teams. Each group was played as a single round-robin where each team would play all of the others once. The winners and runners-up of each group would contest the semi-finals with the winners advancing to the final and the losers contesting the third-place play-off.

=== Participants ===
- Aruba
- Anguilla
- Antigua and Barbuda
- Barbados
- Bermuda
- British Virgin Islands
- Cayman Islands
- Dominica
- Dominican Republic
- French Guiana
- Grenada
- Guyana
- Haiti
- Jamaica
- Martinique
- Netherlands Antilles
- Puerto Rico
- Saint Kitts and Nevis
- Saint Vincent and the Grenadines
- Saint Lucia
- Trinidad and Tobago

== Qualifying tournament ==
=== First stage ===
==== Group 1 ====
Qualifying group 1 was played between 12 and 16 March 1997. Martinique advanced as group winners after defeating Saint Vincent and the Grenadines 7–1 in their final match.

===== Table =====
Pos	Team	Pld	W	D	L	GF	GA	GD	Pts	Qualification
1	Martinique	2	2	0	0	8	1	+7	6	Qualification for 1997 Caribbean Cup
2	Saint Lucia	2	1	0	1	3	3	0	3	
3	Saint Vincent and the Grenadines	2	0	0	2	3	10	−7	0	

===== Results =====
12 March 1997

Martinique	1–0	Saint Lucia

14 March 1997

Saint Lucia	3–2	Saint Vincent and the Grenadines

16 March 1997

Martinique	7–1	Saint Vincent and the Grenadines
Unknown 7'		Joseph 54'

==== Group 2 ====
The Cayman Islands and Puerto Rico withdrew. Jamaica defeated Bermuda to advance.

Qualifying group 2
Team 1	Agg.	Team 2	1st leg	2nd leg
Jamaica	4–2	Bermuda	1–0	3–2 (Note: Both legs were played in Kingston, Jamaica.)

Notes:
21 February 1997

Jamaica	1–0	Bermuda
Williams 6'

National Stadium, Kingston
27 February 1997

Jamaica	3–2	Bermuda
Dixon 35'; Malcolm 43'; Sewell 62'		Russell 51'; Simons 74'

National Stadium, Kingston

Jamaica won 4–2 on aggregate.

==== Group 3 ====
Guyana defeated French Guiana to advance and contest group 4.

Qualifying group 2
Team 1	Agg.	Team 2	1st leg	2nd leg
Guyana	4–2	French Guiana	2–0	2–2 (Note: Both legs were played in Georgetown, Guyana.)

Notes:
19 February 1997

Guyana	2–0	French Guiana
Stanton 2'

Georgetown
23 February 1997

French Guiana	2–2	Guyana
Unknown 2'		Stanton 2'

Georgetown

Guyana won 4–2 on aggregate.

==== Group 4 ====
Qualifying group 4, held in Trinidad and Tobago, was played between 2 and 6 April 1997. Grenada advanced as group winners on goal difference. On each matchday, Trinidad and Tobago played a friendly against one of the three teams in the group.

===== Table =====
Pos	Team	Pld	W	D	L	GF	GA	GD	Pts	Qualification
1	Grenada	2	1	1	0	6	2	+4	4	Qualification for 1997 Caribbean Cup
2	Barbados	2	1	1	0	3	1	+2	4	
3	Guyana	2	0	0	2	1	7	−6	0	

===== Results =====
2 April 1997

Barbados	1–1	Grenada
Lavine 22'		Joseph 89'

Port of Spain

4 April 1997

Grenada	5–1	Guyana
Charles 19'; Celestine 51'; Drayton 61'; Modeste 89'; Unknown		Trotz

Port of Spain

6 April 1997

Guyana	0–2	Barbados
		Lavine 40'; Alexander 52'

Port of Spain

==== Group 5 ====
Qualifying group 5, held in Dominica, was played between 2 and 6 April 1997. Dominica advanced as group winners after defeating Anguilla 5–0 in their final match.

===== Table =====
Pos	Team	Pld	W	D	L	GF	GA	GD	Pts	Qualification
1	Dominica	3	3	0	0	12	1	+11	9	Qualification for 1997 Caribbean Cup
2	Sint Maarten	3	2	0	1	6	3	+3	6	
3	British Virgin Islands	3	1	0	2	7	10	−3	3	
4	Anguilla	3	0	0	3	1	12	−11	0	

===== Results =====
2 April 1997

Sint Maarten	3–0	Anguilla

Roseau
2 April 1997

Dominica	6–1	British Virgin Islands

Roseau

3 April 1997

British Virgin Islands	4–1	Anguilla

Roseau
4 April 1997

Dominica	1–0	Sint Maarten

Roseau

6 April 1997

Sint Maarten	3–2	British Virgin Islands

Roseau
6 April 1997

Dominica	5–0	Anguilla

Roseau

==== Group 6 ====
Aruba defeated the Netherlands Antilles to advance.

Qualifying group 2
Team 1	Agg.	Team 2	1st leg	2nd leg
Aruba	2–1	Netherlands Antilles	2–1	— (Note: Second leg was not played.)

Notes:
2 March 1997

Aruba	2–1	Netherlands Antilles

Netherlands Antilles	Not played	Aruba

Second leg not played, Aruba advanced.

=== Qualifying play-off ===
Grenada received a bye. Martinique and Jamaica also qualified after defeating Dominica and Aruba respectively.

Qualifying group 2
Team 1	Agg.	Team 2	1st leg	2nd leg
Dominica	1–9	Martinique	1–2	0–7
Aruba	0–6	Jamaica	0–6	— (Note: Second leg was not played.)
Grenada	Bye	null	—	

Notes:
27 April 1997

Dominica	1–2	Martinique

4 May 1997

Martinique	7–0	Dominica

Martinique won 9–1 on aggregate.

4 May 1997

Aruba	0–6	Jamaica
		Whitmore 2'; Young 3'; Sewell

Second leg not played, Jamaica advanced.

== Final tournament ==
=== Group A ===
In group A, Grenada and Jamaica advanced to the semi-finals after finishing on four points each. Grenada won the group on goals scored.

==== Table ====
Pos	Team	Pld	W	D	L	GF	GA	GD	Pts	Qualification
1	Grenada	2	1	1	0	4	2	+2	4	Qualification for the semi-finals
2	Jamaica	2	1	1	0	3	1	+2	4	Qualification for the semi-finals
3	Antigua and Barbuda	2	0	0	2	1	5	−4	0	

==== Results ====
4 July 1997

Grenada	1–1	Jamaica
Charles 6'		Hall 85'

Antigua Recreation Ground, St. John's

6 July 1997

Antigua and Barbuda	1–3	Grenada
Edwards 22'		Dinnha; Modeste 2'

Antigua Recreation Ground, St. John's

8 July 1997

Antigua and Barbuda	0–2	Jamaica
		Simpson 26'; Whitmore 87'

Antigua Recreation Ground, St. John's

=== Group B ===
In group B, all three teams ended with a record of one win and one loss. Trinidad and Tobago advanced as group winners on goal difference. Saint Kitts and Nevis and Martinique were also tied on goal difference and goals scored. Saint Kitts and Nevis advanced to the semi-finals on their head-to-head record with Martinique.

==== Table ====
Pos	Team	Pld	W	D	L	GF	GA	GD	Pts	Qualification
1	Trinidad and Tobago	2	1	0	1	4	2	+2	3	Qualification for the semi-finals
2	Saint Kitts and Nevis	2	1	0	1	2	3	−1	3	Qualification for the semi-finals
3	Martinique	2	1	0	1	2	3	−1	3	

==== Results ====
4 July 1997

Martinique	2–1	Trinidad and Tobago
Thierry Fondelot 17' (pen.); Mondenstti 87'		Nakhid 7'

Warner Park, Basseterre

6 July 1997

Martinique	0–2	Saint Kitts and Nevis

Warner Park, Basseterre

8 July 1997

Saint Kitts and Nevis	0–3	Trinidad and Tobago
		Nixon 6', 44'; Nakhid 26'

Warner Park, Basseterre

=== Knockout stage ===
Knockout phase
Team 1	Score	Team 2
Semi-finals
Trinidad and Tobago	1–1 (a.e.t.) (4–2 p)	Jamaica
Saint Kitts and Nevis	2–1 (a.e.t.)	Grenada
Third-place play-off
Jamaica	4–1	Grenada
Final
Trinidad and Tobago	4–0	Saint Kitts and Nevis

==== Semi-finals ====
Both teams from group B, Trinidad and Tobago and Saint Kitts and Nevis, advanced to the final after defeating Jamaica and Grenada respectively.

10 July 1997

Trinidad and Tobago	1–1 (a.e.t.)	Jamaica
Andrews 65'		Whitmore 23'
Penalties
	4–2

Antigua Recreation Ground, St. John's

10 July 1997

Saint Kitts and Nevis	2–1 (a.e.t.)	Grenada
Grumbs 86', 107' (pen.)		Modeste 51'

Warner Park, Basseterre

==== Third-place play-off ====
Goals from Paul Hall, Ricardo Gardner, Paul Young helped Jamaica to a 4–1 win to finish third.

13 July 1997

Jamaica	4–1	Grenada
Hall 5', 20'; Gardener 7'; Young 85'		Watts 13'

St. John's, Antigua and Barbuda

==== Final ====
Goals from Jerren Nixon, Marvin Andrews and Peter Prospar helped Trinidad and Tobago to a 4–0 win as they won the competition for the sixth time.

13 July 1997

Trinidad and Tobago	4–0	Saint Kitts and Nevis
Nixon 2'; Andrews 28'; Prospar 46', 65'

Antigua Recreation Ground, St. John's
