= Winston Anglin =

Jamaican footballer (1962-2004)

Personal information
- Date of birth: 27 August 1962
- Place of birth: Jamaica
- Date of death: 5 September 2004 (aged 42)
- Place of death: Discovery Bay, Jamaica
- Position: Midfielder

Senior career*
Years	Team	Apps	(Gls)
- Wadadah
- Waterhouse
- Violet Kickers
- Village United
- Invaders

International career
1987–1993	Jamaica	37	(8)
- * Club domestic league appearances and goals

Winston Anglin (27 August 1962 – 5 September 2004) was a Jamaican international football player.

== Club career ==
Nicknamed Twinny Bug he played for local sides Wadadah F.C., Waterhouse F.C. and Village United F.C. He was one of the island's most consistent, but sharp-tempered midfielders of the 1980s.

== International career ==
He also played 83 times for the Reggae Boyz and scored one goal in Jamaica's 2–0 victory over Trinidad and Tobago in the final of the Shell Caribbean Cup in 1991. Also, he scored twice in a World Cup qualifier against Puerto Rico in 1988.

=== Drugs offence ===
However, his career as a national team player ended in 1995 after he was given an 18-month sentence in the US for cocaine trafficking. Anglin was held at New York's JFK International Airport with 103 ballons of the drug in his stomach. He returned to Jamaica shortly after being released on parole and continued to play club football, doing so well that his supporters waged numerous calls for his return to the national team. But his drug conviction and several battles with match officials forced national coaches to ignore his claims for a recall.

== Death ==
Like other former Reggae Boyz stars Stephen Malcolm and Peter Cargill, Anglin was killed in a road accident near Discovery Bay. He died in St Ann's Bay hospital after the car he was travelling in overturned on a rural and unlit highway on Jamaica's north coast, hit a rock and landed upside down. He was returning home after watching Jamaica's World Cup qualifier against Panama at the National Stadium in Kingston. According to police reports, he died from severe trauma to the head and body.
