= Estadio Doroteo Guamuch Flores disaster =

1996 football crowd disaster

The Estadio Doroteo Guamuch Flores disaster was a crowd disaster that occurred on 16 October 1996 in Guatemala City, Guatemala.

== Details ==
On 16 October, 1996, before a 1998 FIFA World Cup qualification game between Guatemala and Costa Rica, over 83 people were killed and over 140 were injured after many fans tried to enter the General Sur sector, which led to a "human avalanche" to the bottom of the stadium stands. Counterfeit tickets resulted in too many people attending, and the inadequate design of the stadium for emergencies led to a stampede and suffocation. The Estadio Doroteo Guamuch Flores disaster is considered to be one of the worst football stadium disasters of all time.

The game itself was suspended right away by Guatemala President Alvaro Arzú, who was present. FIFA prevented the stadium from being used for international games until the stadium's problems were fixed. The game ban eventually lasted for 2+ years. Some of the stadium's problems have since been addressed, but the stadium still has some safety issues and is considered to be prone to another emergency situation.

It is said that nearly 55,000 people were attempting to attend that day, but the stadium days before was only capable of holding 37,500 people. According to a local report, the amount of tickets exceeded stadium capacity, and counterfeit tickets made attendance unable to be controlled. After the disaster, 13 directors were deemed responsible for the casualties, but all charges against them were eventually dropped. The Confederación Deportiva Autónoma de Guatemala does not claim responsibility for the facility, stating that it is the sports event organizer's duty, and does not offer an emergency plan for the stadium.

To adhere to FIFA recommendations afterwards, the capacity of the stadium – which had zero numbered or individual seating then – was lowered.
