= Paul Davis (footballer, born 1962) =

Jamaican footballer

Personal information
- Full name: Paul Anthony Davis Snr
- Date of birth: 13 July 1962 (age 64)
- Place of birth: Montego Bay, Jamaica
- Position: Forward

Youth career
- Police Nationals

Senior career*
| Years | Team | Apps | (Gls) |
- Arnett Gardens
| 1982–1986 | Seba United | | |
| 1986–1990 | Maccabi Netanya | | (10) |
| 1989–1990 | → Beitar Jerusalem (loan) | | (1) |
| 1990–2003 | Seba United | | |

International career
| 1982–1997 | Jamaica | 61 | (18) |

Managerial career
- 2010–2012: Arnett Gardens
- 2016: Montego Bay United
- 2017–2018: Mount Pleasant
- 2019–2021: Mount Pleasant
- 2021–2023: Arnett Gardens
- * Club domestic league appearances and goals

Paul Davis (born 1962), also known as Tegat Davis, is a Jamaican football manager and former player.

== Club career ==
Davis played for Seba United in the Jamaica Premier League. He was awarded the top goalscorer and the most valuable player awards at the 1991 Caribbean Cup.

David also played in Israel for four years.

== International career ==
Davis won 61 caps for Jamaica at senior level, scoring 18 goals.

== Management career ==
=== Arnett Gardens ===
From 2010 to 2012 Davis worked as the manager of Arnett Gardens.

=== Montego Bay United ===
In 2016, Davis was named manager of Montego Bay United. In his first season Davis led them to a third place finish in the regular season. In the playoffs that same season, they defeated Arnett Gardens 4–3 on aggregate in the semi-finals before defeating Portmore United 2–1 in the final. Davis didn't return for the following season due to previous commitments prior to taking the job at Montego Bay United.

=== Mount Pleasant ===
In 2017, Davis was announced as the new head coach for Mount Pleasant. In the 2019–20 National Premier League season, Davis' Mount Pleasant team were one point off the top of the league before the season was later cancelled with four games remaining. He was later relieved from his managerial duties on 14 July 2021, three games into the 2021 Jamaica Premier League season.

=== Return to Arnett Gardens ===
On 26 October 2021, it was announced that Davis will return as head coach for Arnett Gardens.

Davis along with four other coaches attended a two-day Continuous Professional Development (CPD) Workshop on 29 and 30 October 2021. These coaches were awarded a CONCACAF B Licence.

== Managerial statistics ==
As of matches played June 11, 2023

Managerial record by team and tenure
| Team | From | To | Record | | | | | | | | Ref |
| Team | From | To | G | W | D | L | GF | GA | GD | Win % | Ref |
|---|---|---|---|---|---|---|---|---|---|---|---|
| Montego Bay United | 19 January 2016 | August 2016 | 16 | 8 | 4 | 4 | 29 | 18 | +11 | 50.00 | |
| Mount Pleasant F.A. | 3 September 2019 | 14 July 2021 | 31 | 17 | 6 | 8 | 43 | 22 | +21 | 54.84 | |
| Arnett Gardens | 26 October 2021 | Present | 53 | 29 | 15 | 9 | 94 | 51 | +43 | 54.72 | |
| Career totals | | | 100 | 54 | 25 | 21 | 166 | 91 | +75 | 54.00 | |

== Honours ==
=== As Manager ===
==== Montego Bay United ====
- Jamaica Premier League: 2015-16
