= Hector Wright =

Jamaican footballer (born 1969)

Personal information
- Date of birth: 8 May 1969 (age 57)
- Place of birth: Jamaica
- Position: Midfielder

Senior career*
| Years | Team | Apps | (Gls) |
| 1988–1994 | Seba United | | |
| 1997 | Long Island Rough Riders | 11 | (3) |

International career
| 1988–1997 | Jamaica | 71 | (16) |
- * Club domestic league appearances and goals

Hector Wright (born 8 May 1969) is a Jamaican former professional footballer who played as a midfielder.

== Club career ==
Wright played for Seba United in his native country, but his career was cut short by injuries. He also has an older brother, Chadwick 'Shaggy' Wright that played club football. In 1997, he played for the Long Island Rough Riders in the USISL A-League.

== International career ==
Wright made his debut for the Jamaica national team in 1988 against Canada and, according to the Jamaica Football Federation, Wright earned 110 caps (16 goals) for his country. This figure has however not been officially acknowledged by FIFA, because the JFF includes all matches, even against club sides, youth or Olympic team. Wright also skippered the Reggae Boyz, he played his last international in 1997 against Costa Rica.

== Career statistics ==
Scores and results list Jamaica's goal tally first.

| No | Date | Venue | Opponent | Score | Result | Competition |
|---|---|---|---|---|---|---|
| 1. | 3 July 1991 | Los Angeles Memorial Coliseum, Los Angeles, United States | Canada | 1–1 | 2–3 | 1991 CONCACAF Gold Cup |
| 2. | 30 May 1992 | Estadio Sixto Escobar, San Juan, Puerto Rico | Puerto Rico | 1–0 | 1–0 | 1994 FIFA World Cup qualification |
| 3. | 4 October 1992 | Independence Park, Kingston, Jamaica | Saint Vincent and the Grenadines | 1–0 | 3–3 | Friendly |
| 4. | 18 October 1992 | Independence Park, Kingston, Jamaica | Canada | 1–0 | 1–1 | 1994 FIFA World Cup qualification |
| 5. | 8 November 1992 | Independence Park, Kingston, Jamaica | Bermuda | 1–0 | 3–2 | 1994 FIFA World Cup qualification |
| 6. | 8 November 1992 | Independence Park, Kingston, Jamaica | Bermuda | 3–2 | 3–2 | 1994 FIFA World Cup qualification |
| 7. | 22 July 1993 | Estadio Azteca, Mexico City, Mexico | Mexico | 1–2 | 1–6 | 1993 CONCACAF Gold Cup |
| 8. | 2 March 1994 | Truman Bodden Sports Complex, George Town, Cayman Islands | Sint Maarten | ?–? | 3–2 (a.e.t.) | 1994 Caribbean Cup qualification |
| 9. | 18 February 1994 | Truman Bodden Sports Complex, George Town, Cayman Islands | British Virgin Islands | ?–0 | 12–0 | 1994 Caribbean Cup qualification |
| 10. | 18 February 1994 | Truman Bodden Sports Complex, George Town, Cayman Islands | British Virgin Islands | ?–0 | 12–0 | 1994 Caribbean Cup qualification |
| 11. | 18 February 1994 | Truman Bodden Sports Complex, George Town, Cayman Islands | British Virgin Islands | ?–0 | 12–0 | 1994 Caribbean Cup qualification |
| 12. | 19 July 1995 | Independence Park, Kingston, Jamaica | Saint Lucia | 2–1 | 2–1 | 1995 Caribbean Cup |
| 13. | 20 October 1995 | Truman Bodden Sports Complex, George Town, Cayman Islands | Trinidad and Tobago | 1–0 | 1–0 | 1995 Three Nations Tournament |
| 14. | 22 October 1995 | Truman Bodden Sports Complex, George Town, Cayman Islands | Cayman Islands | ?–? | 5–1 | 1995 Three Nations Tournament |
| 15. | 26 May 1996 | Palo Seco Velodrome, Palo Seco, Trinidad and Tobago | Saint Kitts and Nevis | 1–0 | 4–1 | 1996 Caribbean Cup |
| 16. | 4 September 1996 | Independence Park, Kingston, Jamaica | Costa Rica | 1–0 | 2–0 | Friendly |
