= Paul Young (footballer, born 1968) =

Jamaican footballer

Personal information
- Date of birth: 11 April 1968 (age 58)
- Place of birth: Saint Catherine, Jamaica
- Height: 5 ft 9 in (1.75 m)
- Position: Forward

Youth career
- 1990–1992: Syracuse University

Senior career*
Years	Team	Apps	(Gls)
1993	Hazard United		
1994–1995	Charleston Battery	46	(48)
1996	Columbus Crew	4	(0)
1996	Rochester Rhinos	4	(2)
1996	South Carolina Shamrocks		
1998	Charleston Battery	7	(3)
1998	Tampa Bay Mutiny	14	(0)
1999	Rochester Rhinos	10	(4)
1999	Hershey Wildcats	3	(0)
1999	Maryland Mania	2	(0)

International career
1989–1997	Jamaica	49	(22)

Managerial career
- 2005–2007: Portmore United
- 2008: Jamaica(asst. coach)
- 2009: Waterhouse
- 2010: August Town F.C.
- * Club domestic league appearances and goals

Paul Young (born 11 April 1968) is a Jamaican former footballer who played as a forward in Major League Soccer, USISL and USL A-League. He also coached Portmore United, Waterhouse F.C. and August Town F.C. in the Jamaica National Premier League.

== Player ==
=== Youth ===
Young attended Wolmer's Boys' School (High) where he excelled in football and academics. Young attended Syracuse University where he played soccer from 1990 to 1992. During his three seasons with the Orange Men, he scored 32 goals and was named as a 1992 second team All American.

=== Professional ===
In 1993, Young began his professional career with Hazard United which won the Jamaica National Premier League title. In 1994, he signed with the Charleston Battery of USISL. He scored 23 goals in 22 games and was named to the USISL All League team. In 1995, he exceeded his previous year's goals total with 25 goals in 24 games, again being named to the All League team. In February 1996, the Columbus Crew selected Young in the 13th round (121st overall) of the 1996 MLS Inaugural Player Draft. He played only four games for Columbus, spending much of the season with the Rochester Rhinos of the A-League and the South Carolina Shamrocks in the USISL. He was named to the USISL All League team. The Battery released him at the end of the season. In 1998, he began the season with the Charleston Battery. After scoring three goals in seven games, he was called up by the Tampa Bay Mutiny On 19 June 1998. He played fourteen games for the Mutiny, but failed to score a goal. On 2 November 1998, the Mutiny waived Young. In 1999, he played for the Rochester Rhinos, Hershey Wildcats and Maryland Mania in the USL A-League.

=== National team ===
Young was a regular member of the Jamaica national football team during the 1990s. In 1997, he devoted himself to the national team as it qualified for the 1998 FIFA World Cup. With 22 goals in his 49 appearances, he was also Jamaica's record goalscorer before being surpassed by Luton Shelton.

== Coaching ==
At some point, Young became the head coach of Portmore United in Jamaica National Premier League. On 27 February 2007, Linval Dixon replaced Young as head coach. In 2007, Young was a coach of a GSA U-13 soccer team in Lilburn, Georgia. In January 2008, Young joined the Jamaica national team technical staff of Rene Simoes but left the staff in late 2008. He returned to coach Waterhouse F.C. from January until May 2009. After a six-month hiatus to coach under-11 and under-15 boys in Atlanta, Young returned to Jamaica as coach of August Town F.C. in late December 2009 through February 2010.

== Career statistics ==
=== International ===
Appearances and goals by national team and year
National team	Year	Apps	Goals
Jamaica	1989	2	1
Jamaica	1992	2	0
Jamaica	1993	1	0
Jamaica	1994	4	6
Jamaica	1995	9	4
Jamaica	1996	13	5
Jamaica	1997	18	6
Total		49	22

Scores and results list Jamaica's goal tally first, score column indicates score after each Young goal.

List of international goals scored by Paul Young
No.	Date	Venue	Opponent	Score	Result	Competition	Ref.
1	18 June 1989	National Stadium, Kingston, Jamaica	Saint Lucia	1-1	1-1	1989 Caribbean Cup qualification	
2	2 March 1994	Grand Cayman, Cayman Islands	Sint Maarten	–	3-2	1994 Caribbean Cup qualification	
3	2 March 1994	Grand Cayman, Cayman Islands	Sint Maarten	–	3-2	1994 Caribbean Cup qualification	
4	4 March 1994	Grand Cayman, Cayman Islands	British Virgin Islands	–	12-0	1994 Caribbean Cup qualification	
5	4 March 1994	Grand Cayman, Cayman Islands	British Virgin Islands	–	12-0	1994 Caribbean Cup qualification	
6	4 March 1994	Grand Cayman, Cayman Islands	British Virgin Islands	–	12-0	1994 Caribbean Cup qualification	
7	4 March 1994	Grand Cayman, Cayman Islands	British Virgin Islands	–	12-0	1994 Caribbean Cup qualification	
8	27 September 1995	National Stadium, Kingston, Jamaica	Costa Rica	–	2-0	Friendly	
9	22 October 1995	Grand Cayman, Cayman Islands	Cayman Islands	–	5-1	Friendly	
10	3 December 1995	Yasco Sports Complex, St. John's, Antigua and Barbuda	Antigua and Barbuda	–	2-1	Friendly	
11	3 December 1995	Yasco Sports Complex, St. John's, Antigua and Barbuda	Antigua and Barbuda	–	2-1	Friendly	
12	24 April 1996	National Stadium, Kingston, Jamaica	Barbados	1-0	2-0	1996 Caribbean Cup qualification	
13	27 August 1996	Estadio Nacional Mateo Flores, Guatemala City, Guatemala	Guatemala	–	1-2	Friendly	
14	23 September 1996	Arnos Vale Stadium, Kingstown, Saint Vincent and the Gernadines	Saint Vincent and the Grenadines	1-0	2-1	1998 FIFA World Cup qualification	
15	23 September 1996	Arnos Vale Stadium, Kingstown, Saint Vincent and the Gernadines	Saint Vincent and the Grenadines	2-0	2-1	1998 FIFA World Cup qualification	
16	10 November 1996	National Stadium, Kingston, Jamaica	Saint Vincent and the Grenadines	3-0	5-0	1998 FIFA World Cup qualification	
17	4 May 1997	Guillermo Prospero Trinidad Stadium, Oranjestad, Aruba	Aruba	–	6-0	1997 Caribbean Cup qualification	
18	4 May 1997	Guillermo Prospero Trinidad Stadium, Oranjestad, Aruba	Aruba	–	6-0	1997 Caribbean Cup qualification	
19	4 May 1997	Guillermo Prospero Trinidad Stadium, Oranjestad, Aruba	Aruba	–	6-0	1997 Caribbean Cup qualification	
20	13 July 1997	Antigua Recreation Ground, St. John's, Antigua and Barbuda	Grenada	4-1	4-1	1997 Caribbean Cup	
21	31 August 1997	National Stadium, Kingston, Jamaica	Trinidad and Tobago	–	6-1	Friendly	
22	26 October 1997	Antigua Recreation Ground, St. John's, Antigua and Barbuda	Antigua and Barbuda	–	3-0	Friendly	
