= Patrick Modeste =

Grenadian footballer

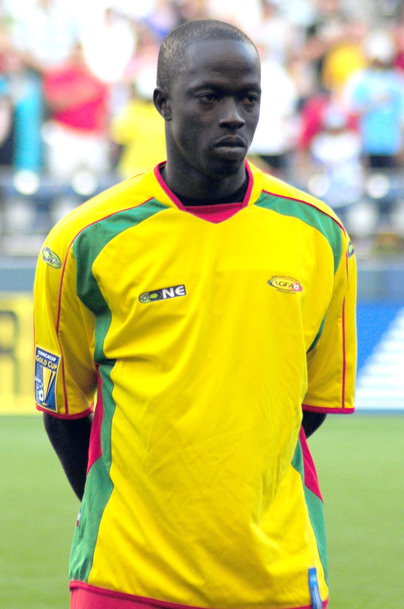

Personal information
- Date of birth: September 30, 1976 (age 50)
- Place of birth: St. George's, Grenada
- Position: Defender

Team information
- Current team: FC Camerhogne

Senior career*
Years	Team	Apps	(Gls)
2004–2016	Anchor Queens Park Rangers FC		
2017-	FC Camerhogne		

International career^{‡}
1996–2015	Grenada	49	(5)
- * Club domestic league appearances and goals as of June 2, 2020 ‡ National team caps and goals as of June 2, 2020

Patrick Modeste (born September 30, 1976 in Grenada) is a Grenadian football player, who represented Anchor Queens Park Rangers FC, and the Grenada national football team as a defender. He currently represents FC Camerhogne.
