= Stephen Malcolm =

Jamaican footballer (1970–2001)

Personal information
- Date of birth: 2 May 1970
- Place of birth: Montego Bay, Jamaica
- Date of death: 28 January 2001 (aged 30)
- Place of death: Duncans, Trelawny Parish, Jamaica
- Height: 1.64 m (5 ft 5 in)
- Position: Defender

Youth career
- Rusea's High School

Senior career*
Years	Team	Apps	(Gls)
1989–2001	Seba United		

International career
1991–2001	Jamaica	71	(3)
- * Club domestic league appearances and goals

Stephen Malcolm (2 May 1970 – 28 January 2001) was a Jamaican professional footballer who played as a defender.

== Club career ==
During his club career he played for Seba United.

== International career ==
Nicknamed Shorty, he represented his country at the 1998 FIFA World Cup in France, which was the first and so far only time Jamaica has qualified for the finals of the tournament. He made his debut for the 'Reggae Boyz' in 1995 and collected a total of 71 caps, scoring 3 goals.

== Death ==
Malcolm died in a car accident, only hours after playing Bulgaria in a friendly international in Kingston. He was on his way back to Montego Bay with team-mate Theodore Whitmore, when his car blew a tire, hit an embankment and overturned near Falmouth. Whitmore was injured in the accident, but fully recovered. Three years earlier Malcolm and Whitmore were involved in a car crash too, in which national team defender Durrant Brown was severely injured.

In 2011, Seba United was renamed Montego Bay United and withdrew the number 2 shirt in honour of Malcolm.

== Career statistics ==
Scores and results list Jamaica's goal tally first, score column indicates score after each Malcolm goal.

List of international goals scored by Stephen Malcolm
No.	Date	Venue	Opponent	Score	Result	Competition
1	14 January 1996	Independence Park, Kingston, Jamaica	Cuba	1–0	1–1	Friendly
2	10 November 1996	Independence Park, Kingston, Jamaica	Saint Vincent and the Grenadines	5–0	5–0	1998 FIFA World Cup qualifying
3	27 February 1997	Independence Park, Kingston, Jamaica	Bermuda	2–1	3–2	1997 Caribbean Cup qualifying
