= Walter Boyd (Jamaican footballer) =

Jamaican footballer (born 1972)

Personal information
- Full name: Walter Boyd
- Date of birth: 1 January 1972 (age 54)
- Place of birth: Kingston, Jamaica
- Height: 5 ft 11 in (1.80 m)
- Position: Striker

Senior career*
Years	Team	Apps	(Gls)
1992–1996	Colorado Foxes	12	(6)
1997–1999	Arnett Gardens	7	(2)
1999–2001	Swansea City	43	(10)
2001–2004	Arnett Gardens	11	(4)
2004–2006	Constant Spring	26	(15)
2006–2007	Naggo Head	11	(4)
2007–2008	Arnett Gardens	35	(12)
Total		145	(53)

International career^{‡}
1991–2001	Jamaica	75	(19)
- * Club domestic league appearances and goals as of 17 December 2007 ‡ National team caps and goals as of 1 November 2026

Walter Boyd (born 1 January 1972) is a retired football striker from Jamaica. Nicknamed Blacka Pearl or The Pearl, he gained a following among Jamaican Football supporters during his career.

== Club career ==
On club level he played for Jamaican sides Naggo Head and Constant Spring as well as for United States outfit Colorado Foxes and Welsh team Swansea City. While at Swansea he scored twice on his debut but also achieved the unusual distinction of coming on as a substitute and being sent off before play had even resumed. He signed again for Arnett Gardens after Naggo Head relegated to the Jamaican second division after the 2006/2007 seasons. On 8 February 2012 Walter Boyd returned to competitive football after more than two years out of the game, coming on as a substitute for Mountain View and inspiring them to a 4–1 win over Rae Town in a KSAFA Super League match at Excelsior.

== International career ==
Boyd made his debut for the Reggae Boyz in 1991 and was capped over 60 times. He played three matches as a substitute at the 1998 FIFA World Cup. His final international match was a July 2001 friendly match against Saint Kitts and Nevis.

== Honours ==
Swansea City

- Football League Third Division: 1999–2000
