= Trinidad and Tobago national football team results (1980–1999) =

- Win Draw Loss

The Trinidad and Tobago national football team represents Trinidad and Tobago in association football and is controlled by the Trinidad and Tobago Football Association (TTFA), the governing body of the sport in the country. From 1992 and 1 July 2013, the association was known as the Trinidad and Tobago Football Federation (TTFF).

The team's largest victory that came between 1980 and 1999 was when they defeated Aruba 11–0 on 23 April 1989. Their worst loss between 1980 and 1999 was a 5–0 defeat from Sweden on 16 November 1983.

During this period, the Soca Warriors won the Caribbean Cup on 7 occasions, the most of any nation. They were able to qualify for the CONCACAF Championship on 2 occasions (1985, 1989), and the CONCACAF Gold Cup, the successor to the Championship, on 3 occasions (1991, 1996, 1998).. During the 1989 edition, which also served as the final stage in the 1990 FIFA World Cup qualification, Trinidad and Tobago briefly missed out on the 1990 World Cup in Italy after a 1–0 loss to the United States.

== Results ==
=== 1980 ===
1 August 1980 1981 CONCACAF Championship qualification	Haiti	2–0	Trinidad and Tobago	Port-au-Prince, Haiti
	Crispin 84'; Bobo 89'	Report		Stadium: Stade Sylvio Cator; Attendance: 15,000; Referee: Marcel Pérez (Mexico)

17 August 1980 1981 CONCACAF Championship qualification	Trinidad and Tobago	1–0	Haiti	San Fernando, Trinidad and Tobago
	Spann 55' (pen.)	Report		Stadium: Skinner Park; Attendance: 5,535; Referee: Carlos Monge (Costa Rica)

22 October 1980 Friendly	Trinidad and Tobago	1–1	Guyana	Trinidad and Tobago
	? (?)	Report	? (?)

24 October 1980 Friendly	Trinidad and Tobago	2–0	Guyana	Trinidad and Tobago
	? (?)	Report

9 November 1980 1981 CONCACAF Championship qualification	Trinidad and Tobago	0–0	Netherlands Antilles	Saint James, Trinidad and Tobago
		Report		Stadium: Public Service Center; Attendance: 5,000; Referee: Frederick Hoyte (Barbados)

22 November 1980 Friendly	Trinidad and Tobago	2–2	Cuba	Trinidad and Tobago
	? (?)	Report	? (?)

29 November 1980 1981 CONCACAF Championship qualification	Netherlands Antilles	0–0	Trinidad and Tobago	Willemstad, Netherlands Antilles
		Report		Stadium: Sentro Deportivo Korsou; Attendance: 7,991; Referee: Glenn Kranenburg (Suriname)

=== 1981 ===
7 June 1981 1981 CFU Championship qualification	Trinidad and Tobago	0–2	Jamaica	Kingston, Jamaica
		Report	Hyde 46'; Russell (?)	Stadium: National Stadium; Referee: Jaime Bosch Bedia (Puerto Rico)

19 June 1981 1981 CFU Championship qualification	Trinidad and Tobago	4–0	Jamaica	Arima, Trinidad and Tobago
	? (?)	Report		Stadium: Arima Municipal Stadium

5 July 1981 1981 CFU Championship qualification	Barbados	1–1	Trinidad and Tobago	Bridgetown, Barbados
	? (?)	Report	? (?)	Referee: C. Cook

17 July 1981 1981 CFU Championship qualification	Trinidad and Tobago	1–1 (4–2 p)	Barbados	San Fernando, Trinidad and Tobago
	Chance 26'	Report	Prescod 54'	Stadium: Skinner Park; Referee: Hubert Tromp (Netherlands Antilles)

2 August 1981 1981 CFU Championship qualification	Suriname	0–0	Trinidad and Tobago	Paramaribo, Suriname
		Report		Stadium: National Stadion

15 August 1981 1981 CFU Championship qualification	Trinidad and Tobago	3–2	Suriname	Port of Spain, Trinidad Tobago
	? (?)	Report	? (?)	Stadium: National Stadium; Referee: R.H. Baker

30 September 1981 Friendly	Trinidad and Tobago	3–1	Grenada	Arima, Trinidad and Tobago
	? (?)	Report	? (?)	Stadium: Arima Municipal Stadium; Referee: Francis Cezair (Trinidad and Tobago)

2 October 1981 Friendly	Trinidad and Tobago	5–1	Grenada	San Fernando, Trinidad and Tobago
	? (?)	Report	? (?)	Stadium: Skinner Park; Referee: Richard Ramcharan (Trinidad and Tobago)

12 October 1981 Friendly	Trinidad and Tobago	2–4	Canada	San Fernando, Trinidad and Tobago
	Neptune 60'; N. Denoon 70' (pen.)	Report	Mitchell (?) (?); Šegota (?); McLeod 85'	Stadium: Skinner Park; Attendance: 3,000; Referee: Trevor Dyer (Trinidad and Tobago)

19 October 1981 1981 CFU Championship	Saint Vincent and the Grenadines	0–2	Trinidad and Tobago	San Juan, Puerto Rico
		Report	Eddy (?); Skinner (?)	Stadium: Estadio Sixto Escobar

21 October 1981 1981 CFU Championship	Guadeloupe	0–2	Trinidad and Tobago	San Juan, Puerto Rico
		Report	Eddy (?); Skinner (?)	Stadium: Estadio Sixto Escobar

25 October 1981 1981 CFU Championship	Puerto Rico	0–6	Trinidad and Tobago	San Juan, Puerto Rico
		Report	Mendes (?) (?); Craig (?); Haynes (?); Joseph (?); Skinner (?)	Stadium: Estadio Sixto Escobar

4 November 1981 Friendly	Trinidad and Tobago	2–1	Barbados	Arima, Trinidad and Tobago
	? (?)	Report	? (?)	Stadium: Arima Municipal Stadium; Referee: Francis Cezair (Trinidad and Tobago)

6 November 1981 Friendly	Trinidad and Tobago	0–0	Barbados	Port of Spain, Trinidad and Tobago
		Report		Referee: Trevor Dyer (Trinidad and Tobago)

=== 1982 ===
21 March 1982 Friendly	Trinidad and Tobago	1–2	United States	Port of Spain, Trinidad and Tobago
	John (?)	Report	Davis (?); Veee (?)	Referee: Osmond Downer (Trinidad and Tobago)

8 May 1982 Friendly	Trinidad and Tobago	2–2	Bermuda	Arima, Trinidad and tobago
	? (?)	Report	? (?)	Stadium: Arima Municipal Stadium; Referee: Osmond Downer (Trinidad and Tobago)

12 May 1982 Friendly	Trinidad and Tobago	4–2	Bermuda	Port of Spain, Trinidad and Tobago
	? (?)	Report	? (?)	Referee: Lennox Sirjuesingh (Trinidad and Tobago

30 May 1982 Friendly	Trinidad and Tobago	2–1	Republic of Ireland	Port of Spain, Trinidad and Tobago
	Nelson (?); Haynes (?)	Report	Brady (?)	Stadium: Arima Municipal Stadium; Attendance: 6,000
Note: This was Trinidad and Tobago's first match against an UEFA member. Eoin Hand, the manager of the Republic of Ireland at the time, claimed that Ireland actually lost 1–2 to a local club side on 30 May, and defeated Trinidad and Tobago 3–0 on 3 June, but the Trinidad and Tobago Football Association swapped around the results so that the first game was an "official" international and the second game was as an unofficial friendly. With no appeals from the FAI officials, the results stood.

27 June 1982 Friendly	Trinidad and Tobago	2–3	Suriname	Port of Spain, Trinidad and Tobago
	? (?)	Report	? (?)	Referee: Osmond Downer (Trinidad and Tobago)

26 December 1982 Friendly	Bermuda	2–2	Trinidad and Tobago	Hamilton, Bermuda
	? (?)	Report	? (?)	Referee: A.B. Clift

30 December 1982 Friendly	Bermuda	2–2	Trinidad and Tobago	Hamilton, Bermuda
	? (?)	Report	? (?)	Referee: Charles E. Marshall (Bermuda)

=== 1983 ===
23 July 1983 1983 CFU Championship	French Guiana	0–1	Trinidad and Tobago	Cayenne, French Guiana
		Report	? (?)	Stadium: Stade de Baduel

25 July 1983 1983 CFU Championship	Trinidad and Tobago	1–3	Martinique	Cayenne, French Guiana
	? (?)	Report	? (?)	Stadium: Stade de Baduel

27 July 1983 1983 CFU Championship	Trinidad and Tobago	2–1	Antigua and Barbuda	Cayenne, French Guiana
	? (?)	Report	? (?)	Stadium: Stade de Baduel

16 November 1983 Friendly	Trinidad and Tobago	0–5	Sweden	Port of Spain, Trinidad and Tobago
		Report	Jingblad 48', 54', 88'; Dahlkvist 14'; Sunesson 77'	Stadium: Queen's Park Oval; Attendance: 7,000; Referee: Trevor Dyer (Trinidad and Tobago)

=== 1984 ===
1984 Friendly	Trinidad and Tobago	1–0	Suriname	Trinidad and Tobago
	? (?)	Report

1984 Friendly	Suriname	0–0	Trinidad and Tobago	Paramaribo, Suriname
		Report

9 June 1984 Friendly	Trinidad and Tobago	1–3	India	Port of Spain, Trinidad and Tobago
	Denoon (?)	Report	Mani (?) (?); Shankat (?)	Attendance: 8,000; Referee: Richard Ramcharan (Trinidad and Tobago)
Note: This was Trinidad and Tobago's first match against an AFC nation.

11 June 1984 Friendly	Trinidad and Tobago	3–0	India	San Fernando, Trinidad and Tobago
	Fonrose 2'; Joseph 60'; O'Brien 85'	Report		Stadium: Skinner Park

22 June 1984 Friendly	Trinidad and Tobago	3–0	India	Arima, Trinidad and Tobago
	? (?)	Report		Stadium: Arima Municipal Stadium

21 July 1984 Friendly	Guyana	0–2	Trinidad and Tobago	Guyana
		Report	? (?)

28 July 1984 Friendly	Trinidad and Tobago	3–1	Guyana	San Fernando, Trinidad and Tobago
	? (?)	Report	? (?)	Stadium: Skinner Park; Referee: Lennox Sirjuesingh (Trinidad and Tobago)

11 November 1984 Friendly	Trinidad and Tobago	0–2	Mexico	Port of Spain, Trinidad and Tobago
		Report	Negrete 1'; España 60'	Stadium: National Stadium; Referee: Richard Ramcharan (Trinidad and Tobago)

=== 1985 ===
24 February 1985 1985 CFU Championship qualification	Saint Vincent and the Grenadines	1–1	Trinidad and Tobago	Kingstown, Saint Vincent and the Grenadines
	Ballantyne 48'	Report	C. Denoon 83'

26 February 1985 1985 CFU Championship qualification	Grenada	1–5	Trinidad and Tobago	St. George's, Grenada
	? (?)	Report	C. Denoon (?) (?); N. Denoon (?) (?); ? (?)

10 March 1985 Friendly	Trinidad and Tobago	1–2	Canada	Port of Spain, Trinidad and Tobago
	Fonrose 89'	Report	Deluca (?); Vrablic (?)	Referee: Nicolas Budisa (Canada)

3 April 1985 1985 CFU Championship qualification	Guadeloupe	1–1	Trinidad and Tobago	Les Abymes, Guadeloupe
	? (?)	Report	? (?)	Stadium: Stade René Serge Nabajoth

14 April 1985 Friendly	Panama	0–0	Trinidad and Tobago	Panama City, Panama
		Report

17 April 1985 Friendly	Panama	1–1	Trinidad and Tobago	David, Panama
	? (?)	Report	? (?)

24 April 1985 1985 CONCACAF Championship	Costa Rica	3–0	Trinidad and Tobago	San Juan de Tibás, Costa Rica
	Williams 15'; Lacey 65'; Nóbrega 79'	Report		Stadium: Estadio Ricardo Saprissa Aymá; Attendance: 9,689; Referee: Martinez Mejia Oscar (Honduras)

28 April 1985 1985 CONCACAF Championship	Trinidad and Tobago	1–1	Costa Rica	San Juan de Tibás, Costa Rica
	N. Denoon 20'	Report	Ulate 12'	Stadium: Estadio Ricardo Saprissa Aymá; Attendance: 10,839; Referee: Rómulo Méndez (Guatemala)

5 May 1985 1985 CFU Championship qualification	Trinidad and Tobago	0–1	Suriname	San Fernando, Trinidad and Tobago
		Report	Wijks 6'	Stadium: Skinner Park

15 May 1985 1985 CONCACAF Championship	United States	2–1	Trinidad and Tobago	St. Louis, United States
	Borja 29'; Peterson 38'	Report	Fonrose 18'	Stadium: Busch Stadium; Attendance: 15,823; Referee: Robert Allen (Canada)

19 May 1985 1985 CONCACAF Championship	Trinidad and Tobago	0–1	United States	Torrance, United States
		Report	Caligiuri 15'	Stadium: Murdock Stadium; Attendance: 6,115; Referee: Jorge Leanza Sansone (Mexico)

18 July 1985 Friendly	Costa Rica	3–1	Trinidad and Tobago	San José, Costa Rica
	? (?)	Report	? (?)

24 August 1985 Friendly	Trinidad and Tobago	1–1	Suriname	Trinidad and Tobago
	? (?)	Report	? (?)

=== 1987 ===
13 September 1987 Friendly	Guyana	1–2	Trinidad and Tobago	Georgetown, Guyana
	? (?)	Report	? (?)	Stadium: Bourda

29 November 1987 1988 CFU Championship qualification	Barbados	0–4	Trinidad and Tobago	Fontabelle, Barbados
		Report	Jones 68', 75'; Charles 8'; L. Lewis 28'	Stadium: Kensington Oval; Attendance: 5,000

6 December 1987 1988 CFU Championship qualification	Trinidad and Tobago	5–1	Barbados	Trinidad and Tobago
	? (?)	Report	? (?)

=== 1988 ===
17 April 1988 1989 CONCACAF Championship qualification / 1988 CFU Championship qualification	Guyana	0–4	Trinidad and Tobago	Georgetown, Guyana
		Report	Allen 20'; Skenne 40'; Gibbons 50' (o.g.); Faustin 60'	Stadium: Bourda; Attendance: 1,500; Referee: Omar Tribulo Monson (Puerto Rico

8 May 1988 1989 CONCACAF Championship qualification / 1988 CFU Championship qualification	Trinidad and Tobago	1–0	Guyana	San Fernando, Trinidad and Tobago
	An. Corneal 68'	Report		Stadium: Skinner Park; Attendance: 1,744; Referee: Success Arlington ( Antigua and Barbuda)

5 July 1988 1988 CFU Championship	Trinidad and Tobago	3–0	Guadeloupe	Fort-de-France, Martinique
	? (?)	Report

7 July 1988 1988 CFU Championship	Antigua and Barbuda	1–1	Trinidad and Tobago	Fort-de-France, Martinique
	? (?)	Report	? (?)

9 July 1988 1988 CFU Championship	Trinidad and Tobago	3–0 (Abandoned '45)	Martinique	Fort-de-France, Martinique
	An. Corneal 25'; L. Lewis 31'; Jameson 44'	Report
Note: This match was abandoned due to a power failure at halftime. The result stood.

31 August 1988 Friendly	Trinidad and Tobago	2–2	Guatemala	Port of Spain, Trinidad and Tobago
	? (?)	Report	? (?)

2 October 1988 Friendly	Trinidad and Tobago	1–2	Canada	Port of Spain, Trinidad and Tobago
	Skeene 28'	Report	Catliff 39'; Mitchell 69'	Stadium: Queen's Park Oval; Referee: Alexis Vaughan (Canada)

30 October 1988 1989 CONCACAF Championship qualification	Trinidad and Tobago	0–0	Honduras	Port of Spain, Trinidad and Tobago
		Report		Stadium: Queen's Park Oval; Referee: Arturo Brizio Carter (Mexico)

13 November 1988 1989 CONCACAF Championship qualification	Honduras	1–1	Trinidad and Tobago	San Pedro Sula, Honduras
	Flores 20'	Report	Charles 56'	Stadium: Estadio General Francisco Morazán; Attendance: 40,000; Referee: Tony Evangelista (Canada)

=== 1989 ===
19 March 1989 Friendly	Trinidad and Tobago	2–2	Paraguay	Port of Spain, Trinidad and Tobago
	Morris 11', 28'	Report 1 Report 2	Ramírez (?); Cáceres (?)	Stadium: National Stadium; Attendance: 12,000

22 March 1989 Friendly	Trinidad and Tobago	1–1	Paraguay	Arima, Trinidad and Tobago
	Lawrence 12'	Report	Franco 51'	Stadium: Arima Municipal Stadium

31 March 1989 Netherlands Antilles Friendly Tournament	Trinidad and Tobago	7–0	Aruba	Netherlands Antilles
	? (?)	Report

1 April 1989 Netherlands Antilles Friendly Tournament	Netherlands Antilles	1–1	Trinidad and Tobago	Netherlands Antilles
	? (?)	Report	? (?)

16 April 1989 Friendly	Trinidad and Tobago	1–1	Bermuda	Port of Spain, Trinidad and Tobago
	Lawrence (?)	Report	? (?)

18 April 1989 Friendly	Trinidad and Tobago	0–1	Bermuda	Arima, Trinidad and Tobago
		Report	Lightbourne (?)	Stadium: Arima Municipal Stadium

23 April 1989 1989 Caribbean Cup qualification	Trinidad and Tobago	11–0	Aruba	Arima, Trinidad and Tobago
	Allen 9', 23', 34', 60'; Fraser 25', 53', 75', 85'; T. Haynes 12', 50'; de Silva 40'	Report		Stadium: Arima Municipal Stadium

10 May 1989 1989 Caribbean Cup qualification	French Guiana	1–3	Trinidad and Tobago	Cayenne, French Guiana
	? (?)	Report	de Silva (?); Fraser (?); N. Denoon (?)	Stadium: Stade de Baduel

13 May 1989 1989 CONCACAF Championship	United States	1–1	Trinidad and Tobago	Torrance, United States
	Trittschuh 48'	Report	Charles 88'	Stadium: Murdock Stadium; Attendance: 10,000; Referee: Luigi Agnolin (Italy)

21 May 1989 1989 Caribbean Cup qualification	Saint Kitts and Nevis	0–2	Trinidad and Tobago	Basseterre, Saint Kitts and Nevis
		Report	? (?)

28 May 1989 1989 CONCACAF Championship	Trinidad and Tobago	1–1	Costa Rica	Port of Spain, Trinidad and Tobago
	Jones 68'	Report	Coronado 46'	Stadium: National Stadium; Attendance: 26,000; Referee: Edgardo Codesal (Mexico)

6 June 1989 1989 Caribbean Cup qualification	Grenada	1–0	Trinidad and Tobago	St. George's, Grenada
	? (?)	Report		Stadium: Queen's Park National Stadium

11 June 1989 1989 CONCACAF Championship	Costa Rica	1–0	Trinidad and Tobago	San José, Costa Rica
	Cayasso 2'	Report		Stadium: Estadio Nacional de Costa Rica; Referee: José Torres Cadena (Colombia)

16 June 1989 1989 Soccer Bowl	Trinidad and Tobago	2–1	Peru	Port of Spain, Trinidad and Tobago
	L. Lewis 9'; Jones 20'	Report	Manassero 7'	Attendance: 5,000; Referee: Hubert Tromp (Aruba)

5 July 1989 1989 Caribbean Cup	Trinidad and Tobago	3–0	Barbados	Bridgetown, Barbados
	Jones (?) (?); Morris (?)	Report		Stadium: Barbados National Stadium

7 July 1989 1989 Caribbean Cup	Guadeloupe	2–0	Trinidad and Tobago	Bridgetown, Barbados
	? (?)	Report		Stadium: Barbados National Stadium

9 July 1989 1989 Caribbean Cup	Trinidad and Tobago	2–1	Grenada	Bridgetown, Barbados
	Yorke 24', 89'	Report	Hood 84'	Stadium: Barbados National Stadium

30 July 1989 1989 CONCACAF Championship	Trinidad and Tobago	2–0	El Salvador	Port of Spain, Trinidad and Tobago
	L. Lewis 50', 61'	Report		Stadium: Queen's Park Oval; Referee: Tony Evangelista (Canada)

13 August 1989 1989 CONCACAF Championship	El Salvador	0–0	Trinidad and Tobago	Tegucigalpa, Honduras
		Report		Attendance: 16,882; Referee: Gonzalo Tejada Perdomo (Honduras)
Note: This match was played on neutral ground.

20 August 1989 1989 CONCACAF Championship	Guatemala	0–1	Trinidad and Tobago	Guatemala City, Guatemala
		Report	Jamerson 57'	Stadium: Estadio Doroteo Guamuch Flores; Referee: Arturo Brizio Carter (Mexico

1 September 1989 Friendly	Trinidad and Tobago	4–0	Panama	Port of Spain, Trinidad and Tobago
	Jones 87', 90', 90+2'; Francis (?)	Report		Stadium: National Stadium; Attendance: 12,000

3 September 1989 1989 CONCACAF Championship	Trinidad and Tobago	2–1	Guatemala	Port of Spain, Trinidad and Tobago
	Jones 10'; Jamerson 88'	Report	Rodas 6'	Stadium: National Stadium; Referee: Cesar Cachay Diaz (Peru)

22 October 1989 Friendly	Trinidad and Tobago	0–1	Finland	Port of Spain, Trinidad and Tobago
		Report	Lius 65'	Stadium: National Stadium; Attendance: 15,000; Referee: Francis Cezair (Trinidad and Tobago)

25 October 1989 Friendly	Trinidad and Tobago	2–0	Finland	Port of Spain, Trinidad and Tobago
	Elliot-Allen 49', 89'	Report		Stadium: National Stadium; Attendance: 8,000; Referee: Gregory Maynard (Trinidad and Tobago)

19 November 1989 1989 CONCACAF Championship	Trinidad and Tobago	0–1	United States	Port of Spain, Trinidad and Tobago
15:30 UTC−4		Report	Caligiuri 30'	Stadium: National Stadium; Attendance: 35,000; Referee: Juan Carlos Loustau (Argentina)

=== 1990 ===
22 July 1990 1990 Caribbean Cup	Trinidad and Tobago	5–0	Grenada	Port of Spain, Trinidad and Tobago
	Alfred 3', 50'; Joseph 35' (?); Elliot-Allen 12'	Report		Stadium: National Stadium; Attendance: 20,000

27 July 1990 1990 Caribbean Cup	Trinidad and Tobago	0–0	Jamaica	Port of Spain, Trinidad and Tobago
		Report		Stadium: National Stadium

29 July 1990 1990 Caribbean Cup	Trinidad and Tobago	Cancelled	Martinique	Port of Spain, Trinidad and Tobago
		Report		Stadium: National Stadium
Note: The final and third place matches were abandoned due to the Jamaat al Muslimeen coup attempt.

15 August 1990 Friendly	United States	3–0	Trinidad and Tobago	High Point, United States
	Vermes 15'; Murray 29'; Eichmann 46'	Report		Stadium: A.J. Simeon Stadium; Attendance: 11,361; Referee: Ed Cummings (United States)

18 November 1990 Caribbean B.W.I.A. Triangular Soccer Series 1990	Trinidad and Tobago	0–0	United States	Port of Spain, Trinidad and Tobago
		Report		Stadium: National Stadium; Referee: 12,000

24 November 1990 Caribbean B.W.I.A. Triangular Soccer Series 1990	Trinidad and Tobago	0–2	Soviet Union	Port of Spain, Trinidad and Tobago
		Report	Shalimov (?); Tsveiba (?)	Stadium: Queen's Park Oval; Attendance: 7,000

=== 1991 ===
23 May 1991 1991 Caribbean Cup GS	Trinidad and Tobago	7–0	Dominican Republic	Kingston, Jamaica
	L. Lewis 7', 40'; Latapy 70', 89'; Thomas 10'; Elliott-Allen 25'; Skeene 63'	Report		Stadium: National Stadium

25 May 1991 1991 Caribbean Cup GS	Trinidad and Tobago	1–0	Martinique	Kingston, Jamaica
	Latapy 37'	Report		Stadium: National Stadium

27 May 1991 1991 Caribbean Cup GS	Saint Lucia	2–1	Trinidad and Tobago	Kingston, Jamaica
	Cadette 32'; Edmund 41'	Report	Skeene (?)	Stadium: National Stadium

30 May 1991 1991 Caribbean Cup SF	Guyana	1–3	Trinidad and Tobago	Kingston, Jamaica
	Laing 20'	Report	Latapy 4', 82'; Jones 2'	Stadium: National Stadium; Attendance: 10,000

2 June 1991 1991 Caribbean Cup F	Trinidad and Tobago	0–2	Jamaica	Kingston, Jamaica
		Report	Davis 6'; Anglin 49'	Stadium: National Stadium; Attendance: 27,000

29 June 1991 1991 CONCACAF Gold Cup GS	United States	2–1	Trinidad and Tobago	Pasadena, United States
	Murray 85'; Balboa 87'	Report	Lewis 67'	Stadium: Rose Bowl; Attendance: 18,435; Referee: José Carlos Ortíz (El Salvador)

1 July 1991 1991 CONCACAF Gold Cup GS	Trinidad and Tobago	2–1	Costa Rica	Pasadena, United States
	Lewis 38'; Thomas 89'	Report	Medford 6'	Stadium: Rose Bowl; Attendance: 6,344; Referee: José Ochoa (Mexico)

3 July 1991 1991 CONCACAF Gold Cup GS	Trinidad and Tobago	0–1	Guatemala	Pasadena, United States
		Report	Espel 89'	Stadium: Rose Bowl; Attendance: 36,703; Referee: José Fuentes (Honduras)

=== 1992 ===
19 April 1992 1994 FIFA World Cup qualification	Barbados	1–2	Trinidad and Tobago	Saint Michael, Barbados
	White 55'	Report	Latapy 18'; Charles 65'	Stadium: Barbados National Stadium; Attendance: 5,600; Referee: Timothy Joseph (Saint Lucia)

31 May 1992 1994 FIFA World Cup qualification	Trinidad and Tobago	3–0	Barbados	Port of Spain, Trinidad and Tobago
	Faustin 63'; Jamerson 72'; Lewis 74'	Report		Stadium: Queen's Park Oval; Attendance: 13,000; Referee: Noel Smith (Jamaica)

17 June 1992 1992 Caribbean Cup GS	Trinidad and Tobago	7–0	Antigua and Barbuda	Port of Spain, Trinidad and Tobago
	Lewis 4', 31', 76'; Latapy 20' (pen.) 44'; Marcelle 5'; Morris 78'	Report		Stadium: National Stadium

19 June 1992 1992 Caribbean Cup GS	Trinidad and Tobago	2–1	Martinique	Port of Spain, Trinidad and Tobago
	Lewis (?); Charles (?)	Report	? (?)	Stadium: National Stadium

21 June 1992 1992 Caribbean Cup GS	Trinidad and Tobago	1–0	Suriname	Port of Spain, Trinidad and Tobago
	Lewis (?)	Report		Stadium: National Stadium

24 June 1992 1992 Caribbean Cup SF	Trinidad and Tobago	1–0 (a.e.t.)	Cuba	Port of Spain, Trinidad and Tobago
	Lewis 112'	Report		Stadium: National Stadium

26 June 1992 1992 Caribbean Cup F	Trinidad and Tobago	3–1	Jamaica	Port of Spain, Trinidad and Tobago
	Lewis 16'; Latapy 37' (pen.); Marcelle 85'	Report	Graham 49'	Stadium: National Stadium; Attendance: 20,000

5 July 1992 1994 FIFA World Cup qualification	Trinidad and Tobago	1–2	Jamaica	Port of Spain, Trinidad and Tobago
	Charles 80'	Report	Isaacs 52'; Anglin 65'	Stadium: Queen's Park Oval; Attendance: 20,000; Referee: Jack D'Aquila (United States)

16 August 1992 1994 FIFA World Cup qualification	Jamaica	1–1	Trinidad and Tobago	Kingston, Jamaica
	Davis 28'	Report	Haynes 40'	Stadium: National Stadium; Attendance: 16,000; Referee: Jose Refugio Ramirez (Mexico)

=== 1993 ===
21 May 1993 1993 Caribbean Cup GS	Saint Vincent and the Grenadines	1–4	Trinidad and Tobago	Montego Bay, Jamaica
	? (?)	Report	Pacheco (?) (?); Felician (?); Yorke (?)	Stadium: Jarrett Park

23 May 1993 1993 Caribbean Cup GS	Trinidad and Tobago	1–1	Saint Lucia	Montego Bay, Jamaica
	St. Louis (?)	Report	Armstrong (?)	Stadium: Jarrett Park

25 May 1993 1993 Caribbean Cup GS	Martinique	3–2	Trinidad and Tobago	Montego Bay, Jamaica
	Modestin (?); Sophie (?); Émica (?)	Report	Charles (?); St. Louis (?)	Stadium: Jarrett Park

28 May 1993 1993 Caribbean Cup SF	Jamaica	3–0	Trinidad and Tobago	Kingston, Jamaica
	Davis 19'; Anglin 60'; Reid 89'	Report		Stadium: National Stadium; Referee: Mark Forde (Barbados)

30 May 1993 1993 Caribbean Cup 3rd	Trinidad and Tobago	3–2	Saint Kitts and Nevis	Kingston, Jamaica
	Felician 23'; Hutchinson 54'; Dwarika 63'	Report	Riley 34'; Huggins 75'	Stadium: National Stadium; Referee: Arlington Success (Antigua and Barbuda)

=== 1994 ===
8 April 1994 1994 Caribbean Cup GS	Trinidad and Tobago	5–0	Dominica	Port of Spain, Trinidad and Tobago
	Cyrus (?) (?) (?) (?); Faustin (?)	Report		Stadium: Queen's Park Oval

10 April 1994 1994 Caribbean Cup GS	Trinidad and Tobago	0–0	Guadeloupe	Port of Spain, Trinidad and Tobago
		Report		Stadium: Queen's Park Oval

12 April 1994 1994 Caribbean Cup GS	Trinidad and Tobago	2–0	Barbados	Port of Spain, Trinidad and Tobago
	Pacheco (?); Faustin (?)	Report		Stadium: Queen's Park Oval

14 April 1994 1994 Caribbean Cup SF	Trinidad and Tobago	3–2 (a.e.t.)	Suriname	Port of Spain, Trinidad and Tobago
	Faustin (?) (?); Dwarika (?)	Report	Tol (?); Kampenaar (?)	Stadium: Queen's Park Oval; Attendance: Arturo Angeles (United States)

17 April 1994 1994 Caribbean Cup F	Trinidad and Tobago	7–2	Martinique	Port of Spain, Trinidad and Tobago
	Pacheco (?) (?) (?); Charles (?) (?); Thomas (?); Eve 46'	Report	Fondelot (?); Sophie (?)	Stadium: Queen's Park Oval; Attendance: 20,000

4 June 1994 Friendly	Saudi Arabia	3–2	Trinidad and Tobago	Pomona, United States
	Abdullah 9'; Al-Owairan 20'; Al-Bishi 29'	Report	Eve 43' (pen.), 78'	Stadium: Richard Stockton College Stadium; Attendance: 1,000; Referee: Jack D'Aquila (United States)
Note: This match was played on neutral ground.

26 October 1994 Friendly	Saudi Arabia	1–0	Trinidad and Tobago	Dhahran, Saudi Arabia
	Massad 68'	Report

15 November 1994 Friendly	Grenada	1–2	Trinidad and Tobago	St. George's, Grenada
	? (?)	Report	? (?)	Stadium: Queen's Park National Stadium

19 November 1994 Friendly	Trinidad and Tobago	1–0	United States	Port of Spain, Trinidad and Tobago
	Lewis 41'	Report 1 Report 2		Stadium: Nationao Stadium; Attendance: 22,000; Referee: Ramesh Ramdhan (Trinidad and Tobago)

=== 1995 ===
15 February 1995 Friendly	Trinidad and Tobago	2–1	Finland	Port of Spain, Trinidad and Tobago
	Raeburn 53' (pen.); John 90'	Report	Kolkka 21'	Stadium: Queen's Park Oval

17 February 1995 Friendly	Trinidad and Tobago	2–2	Finland	Port of Spain, Trinidad and Tobago
	Prosper 44'; Cyrus 88'	Report 1 Report 2	Helin 52'; Kolkka 88'	Stadium: Queen's Park Oval; Attendance: 1,000; Referee: Austin Eric Harewood (Trinidad and Tobago)

19 July 1995 1995 Caribbean Cup GS	Trinidad and Tobago	2–0	Cuba	Kingston, Jamaica
	Eve 31', 76'	Report		Stadium: National Stadium; Attendance: 2,000; Referee: Benito Armando Archundia (Mexico)

21 July 1995 1995 Caribbean Cup GS	Trinidad and Tobago	5–0	Saint Lucia	Montego Bay, Jamaica
	Lewis (?) (?); Dwarika (?) (?); Eve (?)	Report		Stadium: Jarrett Park; Attendance: 3,000; Referee: Robert Sawtell (Canada)

23 July 1995 1995 Caribbean Cup GS	Jamaica	1–0	Trinidad and Tobago	Kingston, Jamaica
	Whitmore (?)	Report		Stadium: National Stadium; Attendance: 1,890; Referee: Benito Armando Archundia (Mexico)

28 July 1995 1995 Caribbean Cup SF	Cayman Islands	2–9	Trinidad and Tobago	George Town, Cayman Islands
	Whittaker (?); Ramoon (?)	Report	Lewis; Dwarika; Cyrus; Eve	Stadium: Truman Bodden Sports Complex; Referee: Rodrigo Badilla (Costa Rica)

30 July 1995 1995 Caribbean Cup F	Trinidad and Tobago	5–0	Saint Vincent and the Grenadines	George Town, Cayman Islands
	Eve 35'; Williams 37' (o.g.); Marcelle 58'; St. Louis 65'; Dwarika 68'	Report		Stadium: Truman Bodden Sports Complex; Attendance: 10,000; Referee: Benito Armando Archundia (Mexico)

3 August 1995 Caribana Cup	Canada	3–1	Trinidad and Tobago	Toronto, Canada
	Kouzmanis 34', 71'; Peschisolido 50'	Report	Boisson 90'	Stadium: Varsity Stadium; Attendance: 3,509; Referee: Esfandiar Baharmast (Iran) / (United States)

6 August 1995 Caribana Cup	Jamaica	1–0	Trinidad and Tobago	Toronto, Canada
	Whitmore 88'	Report		Stadium: Varsity Stadium; Attendance: 6,782; Referee: Tony Camacho (Canada)

24 September 1995 Friendly	Trinidad and Tobago	1–0	Jamaica	Port of Spain, Trinidad and Tobago
	? (?)	Report		Stadium: Queen's Park Oval

20 October 1995 Cayman Islands Friendly Tournament	Jamaica	1–0	Trinidad and Tobago	George Town, Cayman Islands
	Wright (?)	Report		Stadium: Truman Bodden Sports Complex

24 October 1995 Cayman Islands Friendly Tournament	Cayman Islands	0–7	Trinidad and Tobago	George Town, Cayman Islands
		Report	Glasgow; St. Louis; Lewis (?); Mulraine (?); Wise (?)	Stadium: Truman Bodden Sports Complex

17 November 1995 Friendly	Saint Vincent and the Grenadines	2–1	Trinidad and Tobago	Kingstown, Saint Vincent and the Grenadines
	? (?)	Report	? (?)

29 November 1995 Friendly	Trinidad and Tobago	3–2	Norway	Port of Spain, Trinidad and Tobago
15:45 UTC−4	Latapy 24' (pen.), 45', 53' (pen.)	Report	T. A. Flo 11'; Levernes 20'	Stadium: Queen's Park Oval; Attendance: 24,000; Referee: Mark Forde (Barbados)

=== 1996 ===
5 January 1996 Friendly	Trinidad and Tobago	0–0	Venezuela	Palo Seco, Trinidad and Tobago
		Report		Stadium: Industry Park

7 January 1996 Friendly	Trinidad and Tobago	0–0	Venezuela	Port of Spain, Trinidad and Tobago
		Report		Stadium: Queen's Park Oval

10 January 1996 1996 CONCACAF Gold Cup GS	Trinidad and Tobago	2–3	El Salvador	Anaheim, United States
	Latapy 59', 64'	Report	Díaz Arce 34', 72' (pen.); Cerritos 50'	Stadium: Anaheim Stadium; Attendance: 27,125; Referee: Benito Archundia (Mexico)

13 January 1996 1996 CONCACAF Gold Cup GS	United States	3–2	Trinidad and Tobago	Anaheim, United States
	Wynalda 15', 34'; Moore 53'	Report	Dwarika 6', 43'	Stadium: Anaheim Stadium; Attendance: 12,425; Referee: Argelio Sabillon (Honduras)

6 March 1996 Friendly	Haiti	0–2	Trinidad and Tobago	Miami, United States
		Report	John 9'; Eve 43'	Stadium: Miami Orange Bowl; Referee: 15,123
Note: This match was played on neutral ground.

21 March 1996 Friendly	Colombia	3–0	Trinidad and Tobago	Nevia, Colombia
	Quiñónez 26', 63'; Valencia 40'	Report		Stadium: Estadio Guillermo Plazas Alcid; Attendance: 10,000

24 May 1996 1996 Caribbean Cup GS	Trinidad and Tobago	1–0	Jamaica	Port of Spain, Trinidad and Tobago
	Latapy 32' (pen.)	Report		Stadium: National Stadium; Attendance: 5,000; Referee: Ronald Gutiérrez (Costa Rica)

26 May 1996 1996 Caribbean Cup GS	Trinidad and Tobago	3–0	Suriname	Palo Seco, Trinidad and Tobago
	Latapy 58', 61'; Rougier 88'	Report		Stadium: Industry Park; Attendance: 6,500; Referee: Joshua Patlak (United States)

28 May 1996 1996 Caribbean Cup GS	Trinidad and Tobago	5–1	Saint Kitts and Nevis	Port of Spain, Trinidad and Tobago
	Latapy 21', 29', 80'; Marcelle 45'; Dwarika 81'	Report	Bedford 79'	Stadium: National Stadium; Attendance: 7,000; Referee: Antonio Marrufo Mendoza (Mexico)

2 June 1996 1996 Caribbean Cup SF	Trinidad and Tobago	2–1 (a.e.t.)	Martinique	Port of Spain, Trinidad and Tobago
	Dwarika 89' (pen.); John 117'	Report	Carole 88'	Stadium: National Stadium; Attendance: 15,000; Referee: Antonio Marrufo Mendoza (Mexico)

7 June 1996 1996 Caribbean Cup F	Trinidad and Tobago	2–0	Cuba	Port of Spain, Trinidad and Tobago
	Dwarika (?); Nixon (?)	Report		Stadium: National Stadium; Referee: Antonio Marrufo Mendoza (Mexico)

13 June 1996 Friendly	Barbados	0–4	Trinidad and Tobago	Bridgetown, Barbados
		Report	? (?)	Stadium: Hadley Court Stadium

15 June 1996 1998 FIFA World Cup qualification R2	Dominican Republic	1–4	Trinidad and Tobago	Santo Domingo, Dominican Republic
16:00 UTC−4	Jimenez 59'	Report	Latapy 37', 67'; Aquino 39' (o.g.); Eve 84'	Stadium: Estadio Olímpico Félix Sánchez; Attendance: 1,500; Referee: Arturo Brizio Carter (Mexico)

23 June 1996 1998 FIFA World Cup qualification R2	Trinidad and Tobago	8–0	Dominican Republic	Port of Spain, Trinidad and Tobago
14:00 UTC−4	John 1', 23', 80'; Eve 16', 42'; Yorke 8'; Rougier 19'; Latapy 90'	Report		Stadium: Queen's Park Oval; Attendance: 8,000; Referee: Rodrigo Badilla (Costa Rica)

28 July 1996 Friendly	Honduras	0–0	Trinidad and Tobago	Tegucigalpa, Honduras
		Report		Stadium: Chelato Uclés National Stadium; Attendance: 1,800

30 July 1996 Friendly	Panama	1–0	Trinidad and Tobago	Panama City, Panama
	Mendieta (?)	Report		Stadium: Rommel Fernández Stadium

1 September 1996 1998 FIFA World Cup qualification R3	Trinidad and Tobago	0–1	Costa Rica	Port of Spain, Trinidad and Tobago
15:30 UTC−4		Report	R. Gómez 54'	Stadium: Queen's Park Oval; Attendance: 25,000; Referee: Óscar Bardales (Honduras)

6 October 1996 1998 FIFA World Cup qualification R3	Trinidad and Tobago	1–1	Guatemala	Port of Spain, Trinidad and Tobago
17:00 UTC−4	Nixon 37'	Report	Ramirez 22'	Stadium: National Stadium; Attendance: 25,000; Referee: Mark Forde (Barbados)

10 November 1996 1998 FIFA World Cup qualification R3	United States	2–0	Trinidad and Tobago	Richmond, United States
13:00 UTC−4	Dooley 53'; Wynalda 84'	Report		Stadium: University of Richmond Stadium; Attendance: 19,312; Referee: Arturo Brizio Carter (Mexico)

24 November 1996 1998 FIFA World Cup qualification R3	Trinidad and Tobago	0–1	United States	Port of Spain, Trinidad and Tobago
12:00 UTC−4		Report	Moore 36'	Stadium: National Stadium; Attendance: 8,000; Referee: Mark Forde (Barbados)

8 December 1996 1998 FIFA World Cup qualification R3	Guatemala	2–1	Trinidad and Tobago	Los Angeles, United States
14:00 UTC−7	Rodas 26', 67'	Report	Eve 30'	Stadium: Los Angeles Memorial Coliseum; Referee: William Laidlaw (Canada)

21 December 1996 1998 FIFA World Cup qualification R3	Costa Rica	2–1	Trinidad and Tobago	Cartago, Costa Rica
20:00 UTC−6	Wanchope 44', 60'	Report	Nixon 7'	Stadium: Estadio José Rafael Fello Meza Ivankovich; Attendance: 25,000; Referee: Pascual Rebolledo Cárdenas (Mexico)

=== 1997 ===
2 April 1997 Friendly	Trinidad and Tobago	3–0	Suriname	Arima, Trinidad and Tobago
	Eve (?); Glasgow (?); D. Lewis (?)	Report		Stadium: Arima Municipal Stadium

4 April 1997 Friendly	Trinidad and Tobago	0–1	Barbados	Palo Seco, Trinidad and Tobago
		Report	Alexander 8'	Stadium: Industry Park

6 April 1997 Friendly	Trinidad and Tobago	2–3	Grenada	Arima, Trinidad and Tobago
	Glasgow (?) (?)	Report	? (?)	Stadium: Arima Municipal Stadium

1 May 1997 Friendly	Trinidad and Tobago	1–1	Jamaica	Palo Seco, Trinidad and Tobago
	Nixon 8'	Report	Butler 83'	Stadium: Industry Park; Attendance: 6,000; Referee: Austin Harewood (Trinidad and Tobago)

2 July 1997 Friendly	Trinidad and Tobago	1–1	Barbados	Bridgetown, Barbados
	? (?)	Report	? (?)	Stadium: Hadley Court Stadium

4 July 1997 1997 Caribbean Cup GS	Trinidad and Tobago	1–2	Martinique	Basseterre, Saint Kitts and Nevis
	Nakhid 7'	Report	Fondelot 17' (pen.); Modestin 87'	Stadium: Warner Park

8 July 1997 1997 Caribbean Cup GS	Saint Kitts and Nevis	0–3	Trinidad and Tobago	Basseterre, Saint Kitts and Nevis
		Report	Nixon 11', 44'; Nakhid 26'	Stadium: Warner Park; Attendance: 2,000

10 July 1997 1997 Caribbean Cup SF	Trinidad and Tobago	1–1 (a.e.t.) (4–2 p)	Jamaica	St. John's, Antigua and Barbuda
	Andrews 65'	Report	Whitmore 23'	Stadium: Antigua Recreation Ground
	Penalties
	Elcock (penalty missed); Hutchinson (penalty scored); Nixon (penalty scored); Nakhid (penalty scored); Julien (penalty scored)

13 July 1997 1997 Caribbean Cup F	Saint Kitts and Nevis	0–4	Trinidad and Tobago	St. John's, Antigua and Barbuda
		Report	Prosper 46', 65'; Nixon 4'; Andrews 28'	Stadium: Antigua Recreation Ground; Attendance: 7,500

23 November 1997 Friendly	Trinidad and Tobago	0–0	Jamaica	Port of Spain, Trinidad and Tobago
		Report		Stadium: Queen's Park Oval; Attendance: 20,000; Referee: (Saint Lucia)

17 December 1997 Friendly	Martinique	3–0	Trinidad and Tobago	Fort-de-France, Martinique
	? (?) 15', 61'	Report		Stadium: Stade d'Honneur de Dillon

18 December 1997 Friendly	Martinique	3–2	Trinidad and Tobago	Fort-de-France, Martinique
	? 15', 89' (?)	Report	Nakhid 18'; John 48'	Stadium: Stade d'Honneur de Dillon; Referee: (Martinique)

=== 1998 ===
4 January 1998 Friendly	Barbados	0–1	Trinidad and Tobago	Bridgetown, Barbados
		Report	John 50'	Stadium: Hadley Court Stadium; Referee: Victor Moore (Barbados)

7 January 1998 Friendly	Trinidad and Tobago	0–0	Jamaica	Port of Spain, Trinidad and Tobago
		Report

21 January 1998 Friendly	El Salvador	2–0	Trinidad and Tobago	San Salvador, El Salvador
	Rivera 42'; Castro 65'	Report		Stadium: Cuscatlán Stadium; Referee: Nery Alfaro Zepeda (El Salvador)

23 January 1998 Friendly	Guatemala	3–1	Trinidad and Tobago	Guatemala City, Guatemala
	Funes 24', 45' (pen.); Ramírez 69'	Report	Nakhid 90'	Stadium: Doroteo Guamuch Flores Stadium; Attendance: 6,000; Referee: Mario Efrain Escobar (Guatemala)

28 January 1998 Friendly	Costa Rica	4–0	Trinidad and Tobago	Alajuela, Costa Rica
	Wright 5'; Bennett 27'; Guthrie 65' (pen.); López 70'	Report		Stadium: Estadio Alejandro Morera Soto; Attendance: 8,000; Referee: Carlos Torres (Costa Rica)

1 February 1998 1998 CONCACAF Gold Cup GS	Honduras	1–3	Trinidad and Tobago	Oakland, California, United States
	Pavón 66'	Report	John 39', 70'; Nixon 35'	Stadium: Oakland Coliseum; Attendance: 11,234; Referee: Peter Prendergast (Jamaica)

4 February 1998 1998 CONCACAF Gold Cup GS	Mexico	4–2	Trinidad and Tobago	Oakland, United States
	Hernández 63', 82'; Ramírez 37'; Palencia 65'	Report	Marcelle 59'; Nixon 75'	Stadium: Oakland Coliseum; Attendance: 17,256; Referee: Mendoça (Brazil)

9 May 1998 Friendly	Saudi Arabia	2–1	Trinidad and Tobago	Cannes, France
17:00 UTC+2	Al-Jaber 16'; Al-Owairan 79'	Report	Knights 19'	Stadium: Stade Pierre de Coubertin; Attendance: 425
Note: This match was played on neutral ground.

28 May 1998 Saint Kitts and Nevis Football Festival	Saint Kitts and Nevis	4–1	Trinidad and Tobago	Basseterre, Saint Kitts and Nevis
	? (?)	Report	? (?)	Stadium: Warner Park Sporting Complex

22 July 1998 1998 Caribbean Cup GS	Trinidad and Tobago	3–2	Antigua and Barbuda	Port of Spain, Trinidad and Tobago
	Knights 13', 29'; John 39'	Report	Christian 37'; Edwards 39'	Stadium: Hasley Crawford Stadium

24 July 1998 1998 Caribbean Cup GS	Trinidad and Tobago	2–1	Martinique	Port of Spain, Trinidad and Tobago
	John 56', 89'	Report	Sorbert (?)	Stadium: Hasley Crawford Stadium; Referee: Peter Prendergast (Jamaica)

26 July 1998 1998 Caribbean Cup GS	Trinidad and Tobago	8–0	Dominica	Port of Spain, Trinidad and Tobago
	John 10', 22', 59', 84'; Nakhid 41', 50'; Knights 76', 88'	Report		Stadium: Hasley Crawford Stadium; Referee: Peter Prendergast (Jamaica)

29 July 1998 1998 Caribbean Cup SF	Trinidad and Tobago	4–1	Haiti	Port of Spain, Trinidad and Tobago
	John 1', 60'; Knights 15', 42'	Report	César 85' (pen.)	Stadium: Hasley Crawford Stadium; Attendance: 4,000; Referee: Felipe Ramos Rizo (Mexico)

31 July 1998 1998 Caribbean Cup F	Trinidad and Tobago	1–2	Jamaica	Port of Spain, Trinidad and Tobago
	John 48'	Report	McDonald 6'; Sewell 34'	Stadium: Hasley Crawford Stadium; Attendance: 8,000; Referee: Felipe Ramos Rizo (Mexico)

=== 1999 ===
28 March 1999 Friendly	Trinidad and Tobago	2–0	Jamaica	Port of Spain, Trinidad and Tobago
	Nakhid 22'; John 56'	Report		Stadium: Hasely Crawford Stadium; Attendance: 28,000

6 May 1999 Friendly	Trinidad and Tobago	2–0	South Africa	Port of Spain, Trinidad and Tobago
	Trotman 27'; John 52'	Report		Stadium: Hasely Crawford Stadium; Attendance: 10,000; Referee: Peter Prendergast (Jamaica)
Note: This was Trinidad and Tobago's first match against a CAF nation.

3 June 1999 1999 Caribbean Cup GS	Trinidad and Tobago	1–0	Jamaica	Port of Spain, Trinidad and Tobago
	John 4'	Report		Stadium: Hasely Crawford Stadium; Attendance: 4,000

5 June 1999 1999 Caribbean Cup GS	Trinidad and Tobago	7–0	Grenada	Port of Spain, Trinidad and Tobago
	Prosper 5', 9', 41'; Eve 28'; Dwarika 35'; Trotman 48'; Andrews (?)	Report		Stadium: Hasely Crawford Stadium; Attendance: 1,000

7 June 1999 1999 Caribbean Cup GS	Trinidad and Tobago	3–2	Guadeloupe	Port of Spain, Trinidad and Tobago
	Mason 40', 90+2'; Prosper 4'	Report	Damas-Agis (?) (?)	Stadium: Hasely Crawford Stadium; Attendance: 1,000

11 June 1999 1999 Caribbean Cup SF	Trinidad and Tobago	6–1	Haiti	Port of Spain, Trinidad and Tobago
	Dwarika 19'; Andrews 56'; Trotman 82'; Mason 86'; John 89'; Eve (?)	Report	Chevalier 53'	Stadium: Hasely Crawford Stadium

13 June 1999 1999 Caribbean Cup F	Trinidad and Tobago	2–1 (a.e.t.)	Cuba	Port of Spain, Trinidad and Tobago
	Rougier 66'; Eve 119'	Report	Prado 81'	Stadium: Hasely Crawford Stadium; Referee: Michael Kennedy (United States)

8 September 1999 Friendly	Trinidad and Tobago	4–3	Colombia	Miami, United States
	John 23', 56', 82'; Dwarika 52'	Report	Valenciano 19', 62', 69'	Stadium: Miami Orange Bowl; Attendance: 6,168
Note: This match was played on neutral ground.

12 October 1999 Friendly	Panama	2–2	Trinidad and Tobago	Panama City, Panama
	Rodríguez 11' (pen.); Phillips 80'	Report	Pierre 60'; Eve 78'	Stadium: Rommel Fernández Stadium

17 November 1999 Friendly	Honduras	3–2	Trinidad and Tobago	San Pedro Sula, Honduras
	Velásquez 44'; Clavasquín 83'; Phillips 86' (pen.)	Report	John 72'; Glasgow 89'	Stadium: Estadio General Francisco Morazán; Attendance: 23,000; Referee: Ronald Gutiérrez (Honduras)

== Record by opponent ==
Team	Pld	W	D	L	GF	GA	GD	WPCT
Antigua and Barbuda	4	3	1	0	13	5	+8	75.00
Aruba	2	2	0	0	18	0	+18	100.00
Barbados	14	9	4	1	0	0	0	64.29
Bermuda	6	1	4	1	11	10	+1	16.67
Canada	4	0	0	4	5	9	−4	0.00
Cayman Islands	2	2	0	0	16	2	+14	100.00
Colombia	2	1	0	1	4	6	−2	50.00
Costa Rica	9	1	2	6	6	17	−11	11.11
Cuba	5	4	1	0	9	3	+6	80.00
Dominica	2	2	0	0	13	0	+13	100.00
Dominican Republic	3	3	0	0	19	1	+18	100.00
El Salvador	4	1	1	2	4	5	−1	25.00
Finland	4	2	1	1	6	4	+2	50.00
French Guiana	2	2	0	0	6	3	+3	100.00
Grenada	3	2	0	1	9	5	+4	66.67
Guadeloupe	6	3	2	1	9	5	+4	50.00
Guatemala	7	2	2	3	8	10	−2	28.57
Guyana	9	8	1	0	20	4	+16	88.89
Haiti	5	4	0	1	13	4	+9	80.00
Honduras	5	1	3	1	6	5	+1	20.00
India	3	2	0	1	7	2	+5	66.67
Republic of Ireland	1	1	0	0	2	1	+1	100.00
Jamaica	20	6	6	8	17	18	−1	30.00
Martinique	11	6	0	5	23	17	+6	54.55
Mexico	2	0	0	2	2	6	−4	0.00
Netherlands Antilles	3	0	3	0	1	1	0	0.00
Norway	1	1	0	0	3	2	+1	100.00
Panama	5	1	3	1	7	4	+3	20.00
Paraguay	2	0	2	0	3	3	0	0.00
Peru	1	1	0	0	2	1	+1	100.00
Puerto Rico	1	1	0	0	6	0	+6	100.00
Saint Kitts and Nevis	6	5	0	1	8	7	+1	83.33
Saint Lucia	3	1	1	1	7	3	+4	33.33
Saint Vincent and the Grenadines	4	3	1	0	12	2	+10	75.00
Saudi Arabia	3	0	0	3	3	5	−2	0.00
South Africa	1	1	0	0	2	0	+2	100.00
Soviet Union	1	0	0	1	0	2	−2	0.00
Suriname	11	5	4	2	14	9	+5	45.45
Sweden	1	0	0	1	0	5	−5	0.00
United States	12	1	2	9	7	18	−11	8.33
Venezuela	2	0	2	0	0	0	0	0.00
Total	192	88	46	58	321	204	+117	45.83

Source: Results
