= Barbados national football team results (1980–1999) =

This article provides details of international football games played by the Barbados national football team from 1980 to 1999.

== Results (1980s) ==
Win Draw Loss

=== 1981 ===
5 July 1981 CFU Championship	Barbados	1–1	Trinidad and Tobago	Bridgetown, Barbados
		Report		Referee: C. Cook

17 July 1981 CFU Championship	Trinidad and Tobago	1–1 (4–2 p)	Barbados	San Fernando, Trinidad and Tobago
	Chance 26'	Report	54' Prescod	Referee: H. Tromp

4 November Friendly	Trinidad and Tobago	2–1	Barbados	Arima, Trinidad and Tobago
		Report		Stadium: Arima Municipal Stadium; Referee: Francis Cezair (Trinidad and Tobago)

6 November Friendly	Barbados	0–0	Trinidad and Tobago	Port of Spain, Trinidad and Tobago
		Report		Referee: T. Dyer

=== 1982 ===
15 May Friendly	Barbados	2–1	Bermuda	Bridgetown, Barbados
		Report		Referee: J. Chandler

17 May Friendly	Barbados	0–0	Bermuda	Bridgetown, Barbados
		Report		Referee: RH. Barker

=== 1983 ===
6 March 1983 CFU Championship	Barbados	1–0	Suriname	Barbados
	Clarke 21'			Attendance: 5,000

8 March 1983 CFU Championship	Barbados	0–0	Suriname	Barbados

24 April 1983 CFU Championship	Barbados	1–1	Guyana	Barbados
	Clarke 72'		87' Johnson

8 May 1983 CFU Championship	Guyana	2–0	Barbados	Georgetown, Guyana
	Hinds 58'; Johnson 76'			Stadium: Bourda

19 November Friendly	Barbados	0–4	Sweden	St. Michael, Barbados
		Report	23' Dahlkvist; 75', 80', 85' Jingblad	Stadium: Barbados National Stadium; Attendance: 4,000; Referee: Frederick Hoyte (Barbados)

=== 1985 ===
13 January Friendly	Barbados	4–1	Saint Lucia	Barbados

20 April Friendly	Barbados	2–2	Jamaica	St. Michael, Barbados
		Report		Stadium: Barbados National Stadium

25 June 1985 CFU Championship	Barbados	0–0	Suriname	St. Michael, Barbados
		Report		Stadium: Barbados National Stadium; Attendance: 6,000

27 June 1985 CFU Championship	Barbados	1–1	Guadeloupe	St. Michael, Barbados
	Alleyne	Report	26' Eliezer	Stadium: Barbados National Stadium

29 June 1985 CFU Championship	Barbados	1–1	Martinique	St. Michael, Barbados
	Chase 47'	Report	40' Cesar	Stadium: Barbados National Stadium

=== 1986 ===
?? June Friendly	Guyana	0–2	Barbados	Guyana
			7' Forde; 44' Niles

?? June Friendly	Guyana	2–1	Barbados	Guyana
			King

=== 1987 ===
4 January Friendly	Barbados	3–0	Saint Vincent and the Grenadines	St. Michael, Barbados
	Nicholls 2', 23'; Alleyne 44'	Report		Stadium: Barbados National Stadium

14 March Friendly	Barbados	2–2	Guyana	Bridgetown, Barbados
		Report

27 October Friendly	Barbados	1–1	Martinique	St. Michael, Barbados
	Hall 87'	Report	47' Cassildé	Stadium: Barbados National Stadium

29 November 1988 CFU Championship	Barbados	0–4	Trinidad and Tobago	Bridgetown, Barbados
		Report	8' Charles; 28' Lewis; 68', 75' Jones	Stadium: Kensington Oval; Attendance: 5,000

6 December 1988 CFU Championship	Trinidad and Tobago	5–1	Barbados	Port of Spain, Trinidad and Tobago
	Charles 32'	Report	18' Clarke	Stadium: Hasely Crawford Stadium

=== 1988 ===
10 July Friendly	Jamaica	0–0	Barbados	Kingston, Jamaica
		Report		Stadium: Independence Park

=== 1989 ===
26 March Friendly	Barbados	1–1	Jamaica	St. Michael, Barbados
	Clarke 41' (pen.)	Report	87' Dias	Stadium: Barbados National Stadium; Attendance: 6,000

28 March Friendly	Barbados	1–1 (3–4 p)	Jamaica	Barbados
	Hall 37'	Report	16' Martin

12 April Friendly	Barbados	1–2	Bermuda	Bridgetown, Barbados
		Report	76' Goater

14 April Friendly	Barbados	2–1 (5–3 p)	Bermuda	Bridgetown, Barbados
		Report

3 July 1989 Caribbean Cup	Barbados	1–0	Guadeloupe	Bridgetown, Barbados
		Report		Stadium: Hadley Court Stadium

5 July 1989 Caribbean Cup	Barbados	0–3	Trinidad and Tobago	Bridgetown, Barbados
		Report	Jones; Morris	Stadium: Hadley Court Stadium

== Results (1990s) ==
Below are the results for the period 1990-1999

=== 1990 ===
16 March Friendly	Jamaica	0–1	Barbados	Montego Bay, Jamaica
		Report		Stadium: Jarrett Park

18 March Friendly	Jamaica	1–0 (1–3 p)	Barbados	Kingston, Jamaica
	Anglin 47'	Report		Stadium: Independence Park

15 April 1990 Caribbean Cup	Barbados	1–0	Saint Lucia	Bridgetown, Barbados
	Charlery 49' (o.g.)	Report		Stadium: Hadley Court Stadium; Attendance: 6,000

29 April 1990 Caribbean Cup	Barbados	1–0	Antigua and Barbuda	Bridgetown, Barbados
	Hall 54'	Report		Stadium: Hadley Court Stadium

17 May Friendly	Barbados	5–0	Suriname	Bridgetown, Barbados
		Report		Stadium: Hadley Court Stadium

26 May 1990 Caribbean Cup	Bermuda	1–1	Barbados	Devonshire Parish, Bermuda
	Goater	Report		Stadium: Bermuda National Stadium

29 May Friendly	Bermuda	3–0	Barbados	Devonshire Parish, Bermuda
	Goater	Report		Stadium: Bermuda National Stadium

9 July Friendly	Barbados	1–1	Grenada	St. Michael, Barbados
		Report		Stadium: Barbados National Stadium

10 July Friendly	Barbados	4–0	Grenada	St. Michael, Barbados
		Report		Stadium: Barbados National Stadium

22 July 1990 Caribbean Cup	Martinique	2–2	Barbados	Port of Spain, Trinidad and Tobago
	O'Neal 6'; Shepherd 51'	Report	39' Chlorus; 48' Largen	Stadium: Hasely Crawford Stadium

27 July 1990 Caribbean Cup	Barbados	3–2	Saint Vincent and the Grenadines	Port of Spain, Trinidad and Tobago
		Report		Stadium: Hasely Crawford Stadium

=== 1992 ===
4 March 1992 Caribbean Cup	Barbados	1–1	Grenada	Bridgetown, Barbados

6 March 1992 Caribbean Cup	Barbados	1–0	Netherlands Antilles	Bridgetown, Barbados

8 March 1992 Caribbean Cup	Barbados	2–3	Saint Vincent and the Grenadines	Bridgetown, Barbados

19 April 1994 FIFA World Cup qualification	Barbados	1–2	Trinidad and Tobago	Bridgetown, Barbados
	White 55'	Report	20' Latapy; 66' Charles	Stadium: Hadley Court Stadium; Attendance: 5,600; Referee: Timothy Joseph (Saint Lucia)

31 May 1994 FIFA World Cup qualification	Trinidad and Tobago	3–0	Barbados	Port of Spain, Trinidad and Tobago
	Faustin 63'; Jamerson 68'; Lewis 84'	Report		Stadium: Queen's Park Oval; Attendance: 13,000; Referee: Noel Smith (Jamaica)

=== 1993 ===
11 March 1993 Caribbean Cup	Puerto Rico	1–0	Barbados	Georgetown, Guyana
	Mueller 44'	Report		Stadium: Georgetown Cricket Club Ground

14 March 1993 Caribbean Cup	Barbados	6–1	Cayman Islands	Georgetown, Guyana
	White 17', 88'; Thorne 70', 75', 82'; Wilkie 71'	Report	36' Whittaker	Stadium: Georgetown Cricket Club Ground

14 March 1993 Caribbean Cup	Barbados	3–0	Guyana	Georgetown, Guyana
	White 33', 43'; Thorne 75'	Report		Stadium: Georgetown Cricket Club Ground

=== 1994 ===
2 January Friendly	Barbados	0–0	Grenada	Bridgetown, Barbados
		Report		Referee: Victor Moore (Barbados)

23 January 1994 Caribbean Cup	Barbados	0–1	Puerto Rico	Bridgetown, Barbados
		Report	Koziol	Referee: Timothy Joseph (Saint Lucia)

27 January 1994 Caribbean Cup	Barbados	4–2 (asdet)	Grenada	Bridgetown, Barbados
		Report		Referee: Ali Black (Saint Lucia)

27 March Friendly	Barbados	2–0	Saint Vincent and the Grenadines	Bridgetown, Barbados
		Report		Referee: Sherlock Wall (Barbados)

7 (or 10) April 1994 Caribbean Cup	Barbados	1–1	Dominica	Port of Spain, Trinidad and Tobago

9 (or 12) April 1994 Caribbean Cup	Trinidad and Tobago	2–0	Barbados	Port of Spain, Trinidad and Tobago
	Pacheco; Faustin	Report		Referee: Robert Sawtell (Canada)

11 (or 8) April 1994 Caribbean Cup	Barbados	2–2	Guadeloupe	Port of Spain, Trinidad and Tobago

=== 1995 ===
12 March Friendly	Barbados	0–1	Saint Kitts and Nevis	Bridgetown, Barbados
				Stadium: Hadley Court Stadium; Referee: Victor Moore (Barbados)

26 March 1995 Caribbean Cup	Barbados	3–0	Guyana	Bridgetown, Barbados
	Riley; Mullins; Goodridge	Report		Stadium: Hadley Court Stadium; Attendance: 2,386

2 April 1995 Caribbean Cup	Guyana	0–4	Barbados	Georgetown, Guyana
		Report	35', 41', 74' Riley; 89' Alexander	Stadium: Bourda; Attendance: 1,500; Referee: Robin Murray (Trinidad and Tobago)

30 April 1995 Caribbean Cup	Barbados	1–1	Saint Lucia	Bridgetown, Barbados
	Riley	Report	Edmund	Stadium: Hadley Court Stadium

7 May 1995 Caribbean Cup	Saint Lucia	2–1	Barbados	Castries, Saint Lucia
	Emmanuel; Elva	Report	Riley	Stadium: Mindoo Phillip Park

19 November Windward Islands Tournament	Saint Vincent and the Grenadines	2–0	Barbados

23 November or 1 December Windward Islands Tournament	Grenada	1–0	Barbados

=== 1996 ===
24 April 1996 Caribbean Cup	Jamaica	2–0	Barbados	Kingston, Jamaica
	Young 44' (pen.); Davis 89'	Report		Stadium: Independence Park; Referee: Harry Davelaar (Netherlands Antillean)

28 April 1996 Caribbean Cup	Barbados	2–0 (3–4 p)	Jamaica	Bridgetown, Barbados
	Goodridge 51'; Sobers 55' (pen.)	Report		Stadium: Hadley Court Stadium

14 May 1998 FIFA World Cup qualification	Dominica	0–1	Barbados	Roseau, Dominica
		Report	63' Proverbs	Stadium: Windsor Park; Attendance: 3,000; Referee: Charles Barrett (Jamaica)

19 May 1998 FIFA World Cup qualification	Barbados	1–0	Dominica	Bridgetown, Barbados
	Goodridge 75'	Report		Stadium: Barbados National Stadium; Attendance: 2,500; Referee: Austin Harewood (Trinidad and Tobago)

13 June Friendly	Barbados	0–4	Trinidad and Tobago	Bridgetown, Barbados
				Stadium: Hadley Court Stadium

23 June 1998 FIFA World Cup qualification	Barbados	0–1	Jamaica	Bridgetown, Barbados
		Report	89' Boyd	Stadium: Hadley Court Stadium; Attendance: 5,000; Referee: Arturo Angeles (United States)

30 June 1998 FIFA World Cup qualification	Jamaica	2–0	Barbados	Kingston, Jamaica
	Whitmore 23'; Boyd 71'	Report		Stadium: Independence Park; Attendance: 15,000; Referee: Ramesh Ramdhan (Trinidad and Tobago)

=== 1997 ===
2 April 1997 Caribbean Cup	Barbados	1–1	Grenada	Port of Spain, Trinidad and Tobago
	Lavine 22'	Report	89' Joseph	Stadium: Queen's Park Oval

4 April Friendly	Trinidad and Tobago	0–1	Barbados	Port of Spain, Trinidad and Tobago
			8' Alexander	Stadium: Queen's Park Oval

6 April 1997 Caribbean Cup	Guyana	0–2	Barbados	Port of Spain, Trinidad and Tobago
		Report	40' Lavine; 52' Alexander	Stadium: Queen's Park Oval

2 July Friendly	Barbados	1–1	Trinidad and Tobago	Bridgetown, Barbados
				Stadium: Hadley Court Stadium

=== 1998 ===
4 January Friendly	Barbados	0–1	Trinidad and Tobago	Bridgetown, Barbados
		Report	50' John	Stadium: Hadley Court Stadium; Referee: Victor Moore (Barbados)

1 March Friendly	Barbados	6–2	Saint Kitts and Nevis	Bridgetown, Barbados
				Stadium: Hadley Court Stadium; Referee: Sherlock Wall (Barbados)

18 March 1998 Caribbean Cup	Saint Lucia	2–1	Barbados	Castries, Saint Lucia

20 March 1998 Caribbean Cup	Barbados	1–4	Martinique	Castries, Saint Lucia

22 March 1998 Caribbean Cup	Barbados	4–3	Saint Vincent and the Grenadines	Castries, Saint Lucia

=== 1999 ===
28 February 1999 Caribbean Cup	Guyana	2–2	Barbados	Georgetown, Guyana

6 March 1999 Caribbean Cup	Barbados	2–0	Guyana	Bridgetown, Barbados
				Stadium: Barbados National Stadium

10 March 1999 Caribbean Cup	Barbados	2–0	Antigua and Barbuda	Pointe-à-Pitre, Guadeloupe

12 March 1999 Caribbean Cup	Barbados	3–1	Dominica	Pointe-à-Pitre, Guadeloupe

14 March 1999 Caribbean Cup	Guadeloupe	1–0	Barbados	Pointe-à-Pitre, Guadeloupe
