= Shot heard round the world (soccer) =

Goal that qualified the United States for the 1990 World Cup

Trinidad & Tobago v United States (1989)
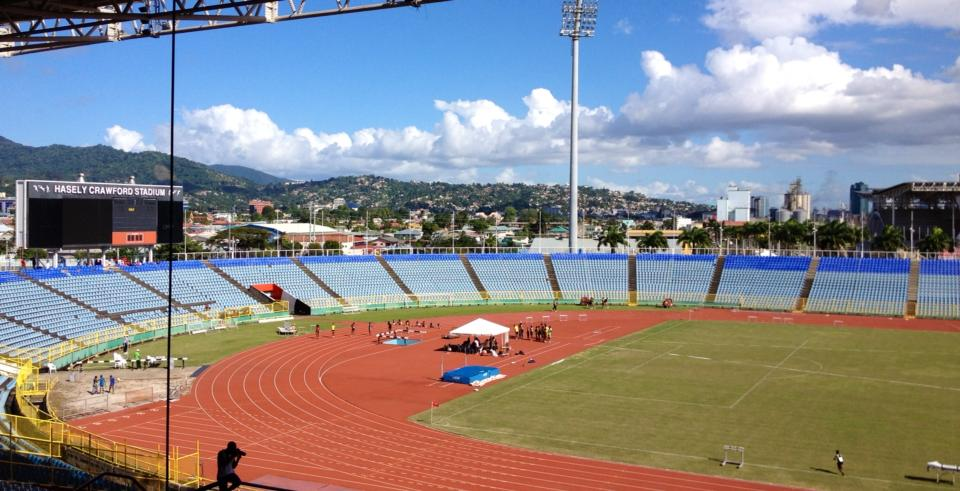
- Hasely Crawford Stadium in Port of Spain hosted the match
- Event: 1990 FIFA World Cup qualification – North, Central American and Caribbean zone – final round
Trinidad & Tobago	United States
(Trinidad and Tobago)	(United States)
0	1
- United States qualifies for the 1990 World Cup
- Date: November 19, 1989; 36 years ago
- Venue: Hasely Crawford Stadium, Port of Spain
- Referee: Juan Carlos Loustau (Argentina)
- Attendance: 35,000

The "shot heard 'round the world" is a term used in reference to one of the most historic goals in U.S. soccer history, which allowed the United States to qualify for the 1990 FIFA World Cup after a 40-year World Cup absence. This goal was scored by Paul Caligiuri in a qualification game against Trinidad and Tobago at Hasely Crawford Stadium, Port of Spain on November 19, 1989.

The U.S. had not qualified for a FIFA World Cup since 1950 and sought to give a good impression to the world of soccer by qualifying for the 1990 World Cup, after having been selected by FIFA in 1988 to host the 1994 tournament.

== Background ==
The United States was one of the five nations competing in the final round of CONCACAF's qualifiers for two spots at the upcoming World Cup in Italy, the other involved nations being Costa Rica, Guatemala, El Salvador and Trinidad & Tobago. Mexico was disqualified due to a scandal related with the age adulteration for a youth tournament, known as los cachirules. At that time, the U.S. team mainly consisted of college and semi-professional players.

The United States started by losing 1–0 to Costa Rica away, then saved a late penalty to defeat Costa Rica 1–0 in the return match at home. They conceded an 88th-minute equalizer to draw with Trinidad and Tobago 1–1 at home, then beat Guatemala 2–1 (home) and El Salvador 1–0 (away). Scoreless draws against both Guatemala (away) and El Salvador (home) gave the United States nine points with one match remaining against Trinidad and Tobago.

Trinidad and Tobago also were on nine points entering their final match with the United States, in large part due to the 88th-minute equalizer against the United States and another 88th-minute goal to defeat Guatemala 2–1 at home in their most recent match.

Entering the final group stage match, the standings of the group were as follows:

	Pld	W	D	L	GF	GA	GD	Pts
Costa Rica	8	5	1	2	10	6	+4	11
Trinidad and Tobago	7	3	3	1	7	4	+3	9
United States	7	3	3	1	5	3	+2	9
Guatemala	6	1	1	4	4	7	−3	3
El Salvador	6	0	2	4	2	8	−6	2

Since Trinidad and Tobago held the advantage in goal differential, they only needed a draw at home to qualify for what would have been their first World Cup finals. The United States, on the other hand, needed to beat Trinidad on the road qualify. Costa Rica had already qualified for the tournament in Italy.

== Match ==
The game was played on November 19, 1989 in the Hasely Crawford Stadium in Port of Spain. The stadium was painted red as an homage to the Strike Squad as the Trinidadian team was then known.

Early on, John Harkes tried unsuccessfully to score, while Trinidad and Tobago's Paul Elliot-Allen had two attempts on goal. Eventually, the breakthrough came in the 30th minute when Bruce Murray passed a bouncing ball to Paul Caligiuri, who dodged a rival defender and fired a looping left-footed shot from well outside the box that beat Trinidadian goalkeeper Michael Maurice and gave the U.S. a 1–0 lead. It appeared that Maurice waited for the ball practically standing on the goal line; he later said he could not see it, arguing that the sun had blinded him.

In the second half, the Trinidadians went on an offensive to find an equalizer, but Tony Meola made several saves to deny them. After the final whistle, the U.S. players joyously celebrated while Trinidad and Tobago was left in consternation.

=== Details ===
November 19, 1989
16:15 UTC-3
18th round

Trinidad and Tobago	0–1	United States
	Report	Caligiuri 30'

Hasely Crawford Stadium, Port of Spain
Attendance: 35.000
Referee: Juan Carlos Loustau (Argentina)

Trinidad and Tobago	United States

GK	22	Michael Maurice
DF	2	Clayton Morris (c)
DF	4	Dexter Francis
DF	5	Brian Williams
DF	6	Marvin Faustin
MF	10	Russell Latapy
MF	12	Paul Elliot-Allen	(substituted off) 75'
MF	17	Kerry Jamerson
FW	11	Leonson Lewis
FW	14	Philibert Jones
FW	16	Dwight Yorke	(substituted off) 61'
Substitutions:
MF	8	Hutson Charles	(substituted on) 61'
DF	19	Dexter Lee	(substituted on) 75'
Manager:
Everald Cummings

GK	20	Tony Meola
SW	5	Mike Windischmann (c)
CB	10	Peter Vermes
CB	2	Steve Trittschuh
RWB	12	Paul Krumpe	(substituted off) 62'
LWB	3	John Doyle
DM	15	Paul Caligiuri
RM	6	John Harkes
CM	7	Tab Ramos
LM	8	Brian Bliss
CF	16	Bruce Murray
Substitutions:
MF	14	John Stollmeyer	(substituted on) 62'
Manager:
Bob Gansler

Assistant referees:
(Argentina) Carlos Espósito
(Argentina) Francisco Lamolina

== Post-match ==
After the game, the group results were as follows:

	Pld	W	D	L	GF	GA	GD	Pts
Costa Rica	8	5	1	2	10	6	+4	11
United States	8	4	3	1	6	3	+3	11
Trinidad and Tobago	8	3	3	2	7	5	+2	9
Guatemala	6	1	1	4	4	7	−3	3
El Salvador	6	0	2	4	2	8	−6	2

Because of the political situation in El Salvador and because El Salvador and Guatemala had no chance to qualify for the World Cup by winning both matches, their remaining matches were canceled.

The U.S. press, considering the significance of the result, described Caligiuri's goal as "the shot heard 'round the world".

After missing nine World Cups, the U.S. team qualified for the 1990 World Cup, but its participation in the tournament was brief. They lost 1–5 to Czechoslovakia, 0–1 against hosts Italy, and 1–2 against Austria.

Trinidad and Tobago suffered a World Cup qualification drought until 2005, when they beat Bahrain 2–1 on aggregate in an intercontinental playoff, allowing the Soca Warriors to qualify to the 2006 FIFA World Cup in Germany and become the smallest country at the time to ever qualify. Yorke and Latapy, members of the qualifying campaign of 1989, were part of that Trinidadian team, which in that World Cup earned a notable draw against favored Sweden 0–0 before losing England 2–0 and Paraguay 2–0, and ultimately being eliminated in the first round.

The U.S. would host a highly-attended World Cup in 1994, then consecutively qualify for the next five subsequent World Cups. Ironically, 28 years later, with the U.S. needing only a draw against Trinidad and Tobago in their final World Cup qualification match, they instead suffered a shocking 2–1 loss and failed to qualify for the 2018 World Cup, ending their streak of seven consecutive qualifications that started with this match.
