= Dexter Cyrus =

Trinidad and Tobago footballer

Personal information
- Date of birth: 27 December 1969 (age 56)
- Position: Forward

Senior career*
Years	Team	Apps	(Gls)
1994–1995	Police		
1996–2006	United Petrotrin		

International career
1994–1997	Trinidad and Tobago	9	(7)

Managerial career
- 2006–2012: T&TEC
- 2012–: T&TEC
- * Club domestic league appearances and goals

Dexter Cyrus (born 27 December 1969) is a retired Trinidadian footballer.

== Career statistics ==
=== International ===
National team	Year	Apps	Goals
Trinidad and Tobago	1994	2	4
Trinidad and Tobago	1995	4	3
Trinidad and Tobago	1997	3	0
Total		9	7

=== International goals ===
Scores and results list Trinidad and Tobago's goal tally first.

No	Date	Venue	Opponent	Score	Result	Competition
1.	11 April 1994	Unknown	Dominican Republic	?–0	5–0	1994 Caribbean Cup
2.	11 April 1994	Unknown	Dominican Republic	?–0	5–0	1994 Caribbean Cup
3.	11 April 1994	Unknown	Dominican Republic	?–0	5–0	1994 Caribbean Cup
4.	11 April 1994	Unknown	Dominican Republic	?–0	5–0	1994 Caribbean Cup
5.	17 February 1995	Queen's Park Oval, Port of Spain, Trinidad and Tobago	Finland	?–?	2–2	Friendly
6.	28 July 1995	Truman Bodden Sports Complex, George Town, Cayman Islands	Cayman Islands	?–?	9–2	1995 Caribbean Cup
7.	28 July 1995	Truman Bodden Sports Complex, George Town, Cayman Islands	Cayman Islands	?–?	9–2	1995 Caribbean Cup
