= Juan Carlos Loustau =

Argentine football referee

- Full name: Juan Carlos Loustau
- Born: 13 July 1947 (age 79); Argentina

Domestic
Years	League	Role
1972–1992	Argentine Primera División	Referee

International
Years	League	Role
1980–1991	FIFA listed	Referee

Juan Carlos Loustau (born July 13, 1947) is a former Argentine association football referee. He is known for supervising three matches at the 1990 FIFA World Cup in Italy. He refereed the Germany vs. Netherlands match in which he sent off Germany's Rudi Völler and Netherlands' Frank Rijkaard after Rijkaard spat at Völler. He also officiated the memorable 1990 World Cup qualifying victory of the United States over Trinidad and Tobago, as well as El Maracanazo. His son, Patricio, is also a professional football referee.

Loustau began his career as a football referee in 1972. He was promoted in 1975 and was appointed assistant referee for the 1976 Argentine Primera División final between Boca Juniors and River Plate, where Rubén Suñé's "ghost goal" won Boca Juniors the match.

In 2010, the International Federation of Football History & Statistics selected Loustau as the 12th best referee of the previous twenty-five years.
