= Arnold Dwarika =

Trinidad and Tobago footballer

Personal information
- Full name: Arnold Dwarika
- Date of birth: August 23, 1973 (age 53)
- Place of birth: Santa Cruz, Trinidad and Tobago
- Position: Midfielder

Senior career*
Years	Team	Apps	(Gls)
1992–1993	Defence Force	?	(?)
1994	Trinity Pros	?	(?)
1994–1995	Superstar Rangers	?	(?)
1995	Joe Public	?	(?)
1995–1997	East Fife	46	(9)
1997	Al-Ansar	?	(?)
1997–2002	Joe Public	?	(?)
2002–2003	W Connection	?	(?)
2003	Qingdao Hailifeng	11	(2)
2004	Guangzhou Rizhiquan	15	(0)
2005	W Connection	?	(?)
2005	North East Stars	?	(?)
2006–2008	Joe Public	?	(?)
2009	United Petrotrin	?	(?)
2010–2012	North East Stars	?	(?)

International career
1993–2008	Trinidad and Tobago	73	(28)
- * Club domestic league appearances and goals

Arnold Dwarika (born 23 August 1973 in Upper Santa Cruz, Trinidad) is a retired Trinidadian football player, who played as a midfielder for the Trinidad and Tobago national team. He went to school at Malick Senior Comprehensive in Trinidad.

== Career ==
Most of his career has been spent in his homeland in the TT Pro League but Dwarika has also had stints in Europe with Scottish side East Fife and Asia with Chinese clubs Qingdao Hailifeng and Guangzhou Pharmaceutical.

Dwarika scored two goals in Trinidad and Tobago's 3–2 loss to the United States during the 1996 Gold Cup. He was a regular member of the Trinidad and Tobago senior squad from 1993, and also played in the under-23 Olympic squad of 1996. He was not considered for the national side for some time after 2004, ruling him out of contention for the 2006 FIFA World Cup, but later returned to the team.

== Honours ==
Defence Force

- TT National League: 1993

Al-Ansar

- Lebanese Premier League: 1997

Joe Public

- CFU Club Championship: 1998, 2000; runner-up: 2007
- TT Pro League: 2006
- Trinidad and Tobago FA Trophy: 2007
- Trinidad and Tobago Classic: 2007
- Kashif & Shanghai Knockout Tournament: 2007

W Connection

- Trinidad and Tobago FA Trophy: 2003
- Trinidad and Tobago League Cup: 2005
- Trinidad and Tobago Classic: 2005
- Trinidad and Tobago Pro Bowl runner-up: 2005

North East Starts

- Trinidad and Tobago FA Trophy runner-up: 2011

Individual

- CONCACAF Gold Cup Allstar team: 2000
- TT Pro League Golden Boot: 1999 (45 Goals)
- Caribbean Footballer of the Year: 1999
- Trinidad & Tobago footballer of the year (3): 1998, 1999, 2001

== International Goals ==
Scores and results list Trinidad and Tobago's goal tally first, score column indicates score after each Dwarika goal.

List of international goals scored by Arnold Dwarika
No.	Date	Venue	Opponent	Score	Result	Competition
1	30 May 1993	National Stadium, Kingston, Jamaica	Saint Kitts and Nevis	3-2	3-2	1993 Caribbean Cup
2	14 April 1994	Queen's Park Oval, Port of Spain, Trinidad and Tobago	Suriname	3-2	3-2	1994 Caribbean Cup
3	21 July 1995	Montego Bay, Jamaica	Saint Lucia	1-0	5-0	1995 Caribbean Cup
4	21 July 1995	Montego Bay, Jamaica	Saint Lucia	2-0	5-0	1995 Caribbean Cup
5	28 July 1995	Grand Cayman, Cayman Islands	Cayman Islands		9-2	1995 Caribbean Cup
6	28 July 1995	Grand Cayman, Cayman Islands	Cayman Islands		9-2	1995 Caribbean Cup
7	30 July 1995	Grand Cayman, Cayman Islands	Saint Vincent and the Grenadines	5-0	5-0	1995 Caribbean Cup
8	13 January 1996	Anaheim Stadium, Anaheim, United States of America	United States	1-0	2-3	1996 CONCACAF Gold Cup
9	13 January 1996	Anaheim Stadium, Anaheim, United States of America	United States	2-2	2-3	1996 CONCACAF Gold Cup
10	28 May 1996	Hasely Crawford Stadium, Port of Spain, Trinidad and Tobago	Saint Kitts and Nevis	5-1	5-1	1996 Caribbean Cup
11	7 June 1996	Port of Spain, Trinidad and Tobago	Cuba	1-0	2-0	1996 Caribbean Cup
12	5 June 1999	Hasely Crawford Stadium, Port of Spain, Trinidad and Tobago	Grenada	4-0	7-0	1999 Caribbean Cup
13	11 June 1999	Hasely Crawford Stadium, Port of Spain, Trinidad and Tobago	Haiti	1-0	6-1	1999 Caribbean Cup
14	8 September 1999	Miami Orange Bowl, Miami, United States of America	Colombia	2-1	4-3	Friendly
15	15 February 2000	Los Angeles Memorial Coliseum, Los Angeles, United States of America	Guatemala	2-1	4-2	2000 CONCACAF Gold Cup
16	20 February 2000	Qualcomm Stadium, San Diego, United States of America	Costa Rica	1-0	2-1	2000 CONCACAF Gold Cup
17	4 March 2000	Hasely Crawford Stadium, Port of Spain, Trinidad and Tobago	Netherlands Antilles	4-0	5-0	2002 FIFA World Cup qualification
18	4 March 2000	Hasely Crawford Stadium, Port of Spain, Trinidad and Tobago	Netherlands Antilles	5-0	5-0	2002 FIFA World Cup qualification
19	2 April 2000	Hasely Crawford Stadium, Port of Spain, Trinidad and Tobago	Dominican Republic	1-0	3-0	2002 FIFA World Cup qualification
20	2 April 2000	Hasely Crawford Stadium, Port of Spain, Trinidad and Tobago	Dominican Republic	3-0	3-0	2002 FIFA World Cup qualification
21	7 May 2000	Hasely Crawford Stadium, Port of Spain, Trinidad and Tobago	Haiti	2-0	3-1	2002 FIFA World Cup qualification
22	4 July 2000	Hasely Crawford Stadium, Port of Spain, Trinidad and Tobago	Cuba	4-1	4-1	Friendly
23	10 May 2001	Hasely Crawford Stadium, Port of Spain, Trinidad and Tobago	Grenada		5-3	Friendly
24	15 May 2001	Larry Gomes Stadium, Malabar, Trinidad and Tobago	Barbados	2-0	5-0	2001 Caribbean Cup
25	22 May 2001	Hasely Crawford Stadium, Port of Spain, Trinidad and Tobago	Cuba	1-0	2-0	2001 Caribbean Cup
26	25 May 2001	Hasely Crawford Stadium, Port of Spain, Trinidad and Tobago	Haiti	3-0	3-0	2001 Caribbean Cup
27	23 April 2003	Stade Pierre-Aliker, Fort-de-France, Martinique	Martinique	1-0	2-3	2003 CONCACAF Gold Cup qualification
28	5 November 2008	Marvin Lee Stadium, Macoya, Trinidad and Tobago	Antigua and Barbuda	2-1	3-2	2008 Caribbean Cup qualification

== Sources ==
- RSSSF stats
