= Terry St. Louis =

Trinidadian former footballer (born 1969)

Personal information
- Date of birth: 23 December 1969 (age 56)
- Place of birth: Port of Spain, Trinidad and Tobago
- Height: 6 ft 0 in (1.83 m)
- Position: Forward

Senior career*
Years	Team	Apps	(Gls)
1995–1996	San Juan Jabloteh		
1997	Charleston Battery	7	(2)
1997–1998	Toronto Lynx	18	(3)
1999–2000	Joe Public F.C.		
2001	Vancouver 86ers	10	(2)

International career
1995–1997	Trinidad and Tobago	11	(3)
- * Club domestic league appearances and goals as of 11 January 2015

Terry St. Louis (born 23 December 1969) is a Trinidadian former footballer who played in the TT Pro League, and the USL A-League.

== Playing career ==
St. Louis began his playing career in his native country with San Juan Jabloteh F.C. in 1995. In 1997, he went abroad to the United States to sign with the Charleston Battery of the USL A-League. With Charleston he scored two goals in seven games, before transferring to the Toronto Lynx. During his tenure with Toronto, he appeared in 10 matches and scored 3 goals, and assisted the club in qualifying for the post season for the first time in the franchise's history by finishing 4th in the Northeastern division. In the playoffs, he scored the lone goal for the Lynx against the Montreal Impact (1992–2011) in the first round match, but ultimately the club was eliminated from the postseason. He returned to Toronto the following season, but was released midway through the season after appearing in eights games and failing to score any goals.

He returned to Trinidad and Tobago and signed with Joe Public F.C. in 1999. He returned to Canada and signed with the Vancouver 86ers making his debut on April 27, 2001 in a match against the MLS Pro-40. With the Whitecaps he secured a playoff berth with the club by clinching their division, but were defeated by the Hershey Wildcats in the semi-finals.

== International career ==
St. Louis played for the Trinidad and Tobago national football team appearing in 11 matches and scoring 3 goals. He won the 1995 Caribbean Cup and scoring a goal in the final match against the Saint Vincent and the Grenadines which resulted in a 5-0 victory. He also featured in the 1996 CONCACAF Gold Cup tournament.

== Honors ==
=== Trinidad and Tobago ===
- Caribbean Cup (1): 1995 Caribbean Cup
