= 1988 CFU Championship =

Tournament details
- Host country: Martinique
- Dates: 5–9 July 1988
- Teams: 4

Final positions
- Champions: Trinidad and Tobago
- Runners-up: Antigua and Barbuda
- Third place: Martinique
- Fourth place: Guadeloupe

Tournament statistics
- Matches played: 6
- Goals scored: 15 (2.5 per match)

The 1988 CFU Championship was the sixth international association football championship for members of the Caribbean Football Union (CFU). It was the final edition as the CFU Championship and was replaced by the Caribbean Cup from 1989. Hosted by Martinique, the competition ran from 5–9 July 1988 and was contested by the national teams of Antigua and Barbuda, Guadeloupe, Martinique and Trinidad and Tobago.

Trinidad and Tobago won the competition for the second time after defeating two-time defending champions Martinique 3–0 in the final round of matches of the round-robin tournament.

== Background ==
The Caribbean Football Union (CFU) was founded in January 1978 as a sub-confederation of the Confederation of North, Central America and Caribbean Association Football (CONCACAF). Later the same year, the first CFU Championship was organised in Trinidad and Tobago.

Martinique were the two-time defending champions after winning the two previous editions in Barbados in 1985 and French Guiana in 1983. Martinique were also the most successful team in the history of the competition after winning the trophy on two previous occasions. Three other teams – Haiti, Suriname and Trinidad and Tobago – had all won the competition once previously.

== Format ==
Two qualifying rounds were held to determine three of the four teams that would participate in the final tournament. Hosts and holders Martinique qualified automatically. For both rounds, teams were drawn into two-legged ties. The team scoring more goals on aggregate in each tie would advance to the next stage.

The final tournament was played as a single round-robin where each team would play all of the others once. The winner would be decided by the total number of points obtained across all matches played.

=== Participants ===
- Antigua and Barbuda
- Barbados
- Dominica
- French Guiana
- Guadeloupe
- Guyana
- Martinique
- Trinidad and Tobago
- Suriname

== Qualification ==
The qualification stage ran from November 1987 to May 1988. Some match results are unknown. It is also unclear whether Antigua and Barbuda, Dominica, Guadeloupe and Guyana received a bye in the first round or if they contested an unknown tie.

1988 CFU Championship qualification
Team 1	Agg.	Team 2	1st leg	2nd leg
First round
Barbados	1–9	Trinidad and Tobago	0–4	1–5
French Guiana	1–2	Suriname	1–1	0–1
Second round
Dominica	1–2	Antigua and Barbuda	0–0	1–2
Guyana	0–5	Trinidad and Tobago	0–4	0–1
Suriname	unknown (Note: The results of the Suriname v Guadeloupe tie are unknown. Guadeloupe advanced.)	Guadeloupe	—	—

=== First round ===
In the first round, Trinidad and Tobago defeated Barbados 9–1 on aggregate and Suriname defeated French Guiana 2–1 on aggregate.

==== Results ====
29 November 1987

Barbados	0–4	Trinidad and Tobago
		Charles 8'; Lewis 28'; Jones 68', 75'

Kensington Oval, Bridgetown
6 December 1987

Trinidad and Tobago	5–1	Barbados

National Stadium, Port of Spain

Trinidad and Tobago won 9–1 on aggregate.

11 November 1987

French Guiana	1–1	Suriname

Stade de Baduel, Cayenne
5 December 1987

Suriname	1–0	French Guiana

Suriname Stadium, Paramaribo

Suriname won 2–1 on aggregate.

=== Second round ===
In the second round, Antigua and Barbuda defeated Dominica 2–1 on aggregate and Trinidad and Tobago defeated Guyana 5–0 on aggregate to qualify for the final tournament. The results of the Suriname v Guadeloupe tie are unknown but Guadeloupe qualified for the final tournament.

==== Results ====
6 March 1988

Dominica	0–0	Antigua and Barbuda

Windsor Park, Roseau
20 March 1988

Antigua and Barbuda	2–1	Dominica
Gonsalves 18' (pen.); Anthony 70'		McIntyre 44'

Antigua Recreation Ground, St. John's

Antigua and Barbuda won 2–1 on aggregate.

17 April 1988

Guyana	0–4	Trinidad and Tobago

Guyana Defence Force Ground, Georgetown
8 May 1988

Trinidad and Tobago	1–0	Guyana

National Stadium, Port of Spain

Trinidad and Tobago won 5–0 on aggregate.

Suriname	Unknown	Guadeloupe

Guadeloupe	Unknown	Suriname

Results unknown, Guadeloupe advanced.

== Final tournament ==
The final tournament was held from 5–9 July 1988. After winning their opening match and drawing their second, Trinidad and Tobago were crowned champions when the result in their final match against Martinique was declared as a Trinidad and Tobago win. The match had been abandoned at half time due to floodlight failure.

=== Table ===
Pos	Team	Pld	W	D	L	GF	GA	GD	Pts
1	Trinidad and Tobago	3	2	1	0	7	1	+6	5
2	Antigua and Barbuda	3	0	3	0	3	3	0	3
3	Martinique	3	1	1	1	4	6	−2	3
4	Guadeloupe	3	0	1	2	1	5	−4	1

=== Results ===
5 July 1988

Trinidad and Tobago	3–0	Guadeloupe

Stade d'Honneur de Dillon, Fort-de-France
5 July 1988

Martinique	2–2	Antigua and Barbuda

Stade d'Honneur de Dillon, Fort-de-France
7 July 1988

Antigua and Barbuda	1–1	Trinidad and Tobago

Stade d'Honneur de Dillon, Fort-de-France
7 July 1988

Martinique	2–1	Guadeloupe

Stade d'Honneur de Dillon, Fort-de-France
9 July 1988

Antigua and Barbuda	0–0	Guadeloupe

Stade d'Honneur de Dillon, Fort-de-France
9 July 1988

Martinique	0–3 (abandoned)	Trinidad and Tobago
		Corneal 25'; Lewis 31'; Jameson 44'

Stade d'Honneur de Dillon, Fort-de-France
