= 1993 Caribbean Cup =

Shell Caribbean Cup

Tournament details
- Host country: Jamaica
- Dates: 21–30 May 1993
- Teams: 8

Final positions
- Champions: Martinique (1st title)
- Runners-up: Jamaica
- Third place: Trinidad and Tobago
- Fourth place: Saint Kitts and Nevis

Tournament statistics
- Matches played: 16
- Goals scored: 51 (3.19 per match)

The 1993 Caribbean Cup, known as the Shell Caribbean Cup for sponsorship reasons, was the 11th international association football championship for members of the Caribbean Football Union (CFU). It was the fifth edition of the Caribbean Cup which replaced the CFU Championship. Hosted by Jamaica, the competition ran from 21–30 June 1993 and was contested by the national teams of Jamaica, Martinique, Puerto Rico, Saint Kitts and Nevis, Saint Lucia, Saint Vincent and the Grenadines, Sint Maarten and Trinidad and Tobago. The competition was used as part of the qualification process for the 1993 CONCACAF Gold Cup.

The final tournament began with the first matches in the group stage on 21 June 1993 and ended with the final on 30 June 1993. Martinique defeated hosts Jamaica 6–5 on penalties after a goalless draw in the final to win the competition for the first time. Both finalists qualified for the 1993 CONCACAF Gold Cup.

== Background ==
The Caribbean Football Union (CFU) was founded in January 1978 as a sub-confederation of the Confederation of North, Central America and Caribbean Association Football (CONCACAF). Later the same year, the first CFU Championship was organised in Trinidad and Tobago. The competition was held semi-regularly until the final edition in 1988. From 1989, it was replaced by the Caribbean Cup.

The tournament was sponsored by Royal Dutch Shell following the input of employees of Shell Antilles and Gulanas Ltd.

Trinidad and Tobago were the defending champions after winning the previous edition as hosts. Trinidad and Tobago were also the most successful team in the history of the competition after winning the trophy on two previous occasions.

== Format ==
A qualifying tournament was held to determine six of the eight teams that would participate in the final tournament. Hosts Jamaica and holders Trinidad and Tobago qualified automatically. The 20 competing teams were drawn into six groups of three or four teams. Each group was played as a single round-robin where each team would play all of the others once. The winner of each group would qualify for the final tournament.

For the final tournament, the eight teams were drawn into two groups of four teams. Each group was played as a single round-robin where each team would play all of the others once. The winners and runners-up of each group would contest the semi-finals with the winners advancing to the final and the losers contesting the third-place play-off. The two finalists would qualify for the 1993 CONCACAF Gold Cup.

=== Participants ===
- Anguilla
- Antigua and Barbuda
- Barbados
- British Virgin Islands
- Cayman Islands
- Dominica
- Dominican Republic
- French Guiana
- Grenada
- Guadeloupe
- Guyana
- Jamaica
- Martinique
- Puerto Rico
- Saint Kitts and Nevis
- Saint Lucia
- Saint Vincent and the Grenadines
- Sint Maarten
- Trinidad and Tobago

== Qualifying Tournament ==
=== Group 1 ===
Qualifying group 1 was held in Grenada. Saint Lucia qualified as group winners after defeating Grenada 1–0 in their final match.

==== Table ====
Pos	Team	Pld	W	D	L	GF	GA	GD	Pts	Qualification
1	Saint Lucia	3	3	0	0	6	2	+4	6	Qualification to 1993 Caribbean Cup
2	Saint Vincent and the Grenadines	3	1	1	1	3	2	+1	3	
3	Grenada	3	0	2	1	2	3	−1	2	
4	Dominica	3	0	1	2	3	7	−4	1	

==== Results ====
March 1993

Grenada	1–1	Dominica

March 1993

Saint Lucia	1–0	Saint Vincent and the Grenadines

March 1993

Grenada	1–1	Saint Vincent and the Grenadines

March 1993

Saint Lucia	4–2	Dominica

March 1993

Grenada	0–1	Saint Lucia

March 1993

Saint Vincent and the Grenadines	2–0	Dominica

=== Group 2 ===
Qualifying group 2, held in Guyana, was played between 11 and 14 March 1993. Puerto Rico qualified as group winners after defeating the Cayman Islands 4–0 in their final match.

==== Table ====
Pos	Team	Pld	W	D	L	GF	GA	GD	Pts	Qualification
1	Puerto Rico	3	3	0	0	7	0	+7	6	Qualification to 1993 Caribbean Cup
2	Barbados	3	2	0	1	9	2	+7	4	
3	Guyana	3	1	0	2	3	7	−4	2	
4	Cayman Islands	3	0	0	3	3	13	−10	0	

==== Results ====
11 March 1993

Puerto Rico	1–0	Barbados
Mueller

11 March 1993

Guyana	3–2	Cayman Islands
Cadogan (2); Stanton		Ramoon (2)

12 March 1993

Puerto Rico	2–0	Guyana
Conlon; Mueller

12 March 1993

Barbados	6–1	Cayman Islands
Thorne (3); White (2); Unknown

14 March 1993

Puerto Rico	4–0	Cayman Islands
Conlon (3); Lugris

14 March 1993

Barbados	3–0	Guyana
White (2); Thorne

=== Group 3 ===
Suriname qualified after both Aruba and the Netherlands Antilles withdrew.

==== Table ====
Pos	Team	Pld	W	D	L	GF	GA	GD	Pts	Qualification
1	Suriname	0	0	0	0	0	0	0	0	Qualification to 1993 Caribbean Cup
2	Aruba	0	0	0	0	0	0	0	0	Withdrew
3	Netherlands Antilles	0	0	0	0	0	0	0	0	Withdrew

=== Group 4 ===
Qualifying group 4 was held in Anguilla. Sint Maarten qualified as group winners after defeating the Anguilla 1–0 in their final match.

==== Table ====
Pos	Team	Pld	W	D	L	GF	GA	GD	Pts	Qualification
1	Sint Maarten	2	2	0	0	2	0	+2	4	Qualification to 1993 Caribbean Cup
2	Antigua and Barbuda	2	1	0	1	4	1	+3	2	
3	Anguilla	2	0	0	2	0	5	−5	0	

==== Results ====
March 1993

Anguilla	0–4	Antigua and Barbuda

March 1993

Sint Maarten	1–0	Antigua and Barbuda

March 1993

Anguilla	0–1	Sint Maarten

=== Group 5 ===
Qualifying group 5 was held in Saint Kitts and Nevis. Saint Kitts and Nevis qualified as group winners on goal difference after defeating the British Virgin Islands 5–1 in their final match.

==== Table ====
Pos	Team	Pld	W	D	L	GF	GA	GD	Pts	Qualification
1	Saint Kitts and Nevis	2	1	1	0	7	3	+4	3	Qualification to 1993 Caribbean Cup
2	Dominican Republic	2	1	1	0	5	3	+2	3	
3	British Virgin Islands	2	0	0	2	2	8	−6	0	

==== Results ====
March 1993

Saint Kitts and Nevis	2–2	Dominican Republic

March 1993

Dominican Republic	3–1	British Virgin Islands

March 1993

Saint Kitts and Nevis	5–1	British Virgin Islands

=== Group 6 ===
Qualifying group 6 was played on a home-and-away basis. Martinique qualified as group winners after defeating Guadeloupe 4–1 in their final match.

==== Table ====
Pos	Team	Pld	W	D	L	GF	GA	GD	Pts	Qualification
1	Martinique	2	2	0	0	6	2	+4	4	Qualification to 1993 Caribbean Cup
2	French Guiana	2	1	0	1	3	3	0	2	
3	Guadeloupe	2	0	0	2	2	6	−4	0	

==== Results ====
March 1993

Martinique	2–1	French Guiana

March 1993

French Guiana	2–1	Guadeloupe

March 1993

Guadeloupe	1–4	Martinique

== Final tournament ==
Suriname withdrew and were replaced by Saint Vincent and the Grenadines.

=== Group stage ===
==== Group A ====
In group A, Jamaica advanced to the semi-finals as group winners after winning all three of their matches. Saint Kitts and Nevis also advanced as runners-up after a 2–2 draw with Sint Maarten in their final match.

===== Table =====
Pos	Team	Pld	W	D	L	GF	GA	GD	Pts	Qualification
1	Jamaica	3	3	0	0	7	1	+6	6	Qualification to the semi-finals
2	Saint Kitts and Nevis	3	1	1	1	4	6	−2	3	Qualification to the semi-finals
3	Puerto Rico	3	1	0	2	3	2	+1	2	
4	Sint Maarten	3	0	1	2	2	7	−5	1	

===== Results =====
21 May 1993

Jamaica	4–1	Saint Kitts and Nevis

21 May 1993

Puerto Rico	3–0	Sint Maarten

23 May 1993

Jamaica	2–0	Sint Maarten

23 May 1993

Saint Kitts and Nevis	1–0	Puerto Rico

25 May 1993

Saint Kitts and Nevis	2–2	Sint Maarten

25 May 1993

Jamaica	1–0	Puerto Rico

==== Group B ====
In group B, Martinique advanced to the semi-finals as group winners after winning all three of their matches. Trinidad and Tobago also advanced as runners-up.

===== Table =====
Pos	Team	Pld	W	D	L	GF	GA	GD	Pts	Qualification
1	Martinique	3	3	0	0	8	2	+6	6	Qualification to the semi-finals
2	Trinidad and Tobago	3	1	1	1	7	5	+2	3	Qualification to the semi-finals
3	Saint Vincent and the Grenadines	3	1	0	2	5	8	−3	2	
4	Saint Lucia	3	0	1	2	2	7	−5	1	

===== Results =====
21 May 1993

Martinique	2–0	Saint Lucia

21 May 1993

Trinidad and Tobago	4–1	Saint Vincent and the Grenadines

23 May 1993

Martinique	3–0	Saint Vincent and the Grenadines

23 May 1993

Trinidad and Tobago	1–1	Saint Lucia

25 May 1993

Saint Vincent and the Grenadines	4–1	Saint Lucia

25 May 1993

Martinique	3–2	Trinidad and Tobago

=== Knockout stage ===
Knockout phase
Team 1	Score	Team 2
Semi-finals
Jamaica	3–0	Trinidad and Tobago
Martinique	1–1 (a.e.t.) (4–3 p)	Saint Kitts and Nevis
Third-place play-off
Trinidad and Tobago	3–2	Saint Kitts and Nevis
Final
Martinique	0–0 (a.e.t.) (6–5 p)	Jamaica

==== Semi-finals ====
Group winners Jamaica and Martinique both advanced to the final after defeating Trinidad and Tobago and Saint Kitts and Nevis respectively.

28 May 1993

Jamaica	3–0	Trinidad and Tobago
Davis 19'; Anglin 60'; Reid 89'

28 May 1993

Martinique	1–1 (a.e.t.)	Saint Kitts and Nevis
Modestin 18'		Huggins 89'
Penalties
	4–3

==== Third-place play-off ====
Goals from Lester Felician, Colvin Hutchinson and Arnold Dwarika helped Trinidad and Tobago to a 3–2 win to finish third.

30 May 1993

Trinidad and Tobago	3–2	Saint Kitts and Nevis
Felician 23'; Hutchinson 54'; Dwarika 63'

National Stadium, Kingston
Attendance: 25,467

==== Final ====
Martinique defeated Jamaica on penalties to win the competition for the first time.

30 May 1993

Martinique	0–0 (a.e.t.)	Jamaica
Penalties
	6–5

Jamaica
