= Arima Velodrome =

Sporting venue in Trinidad and Tobago

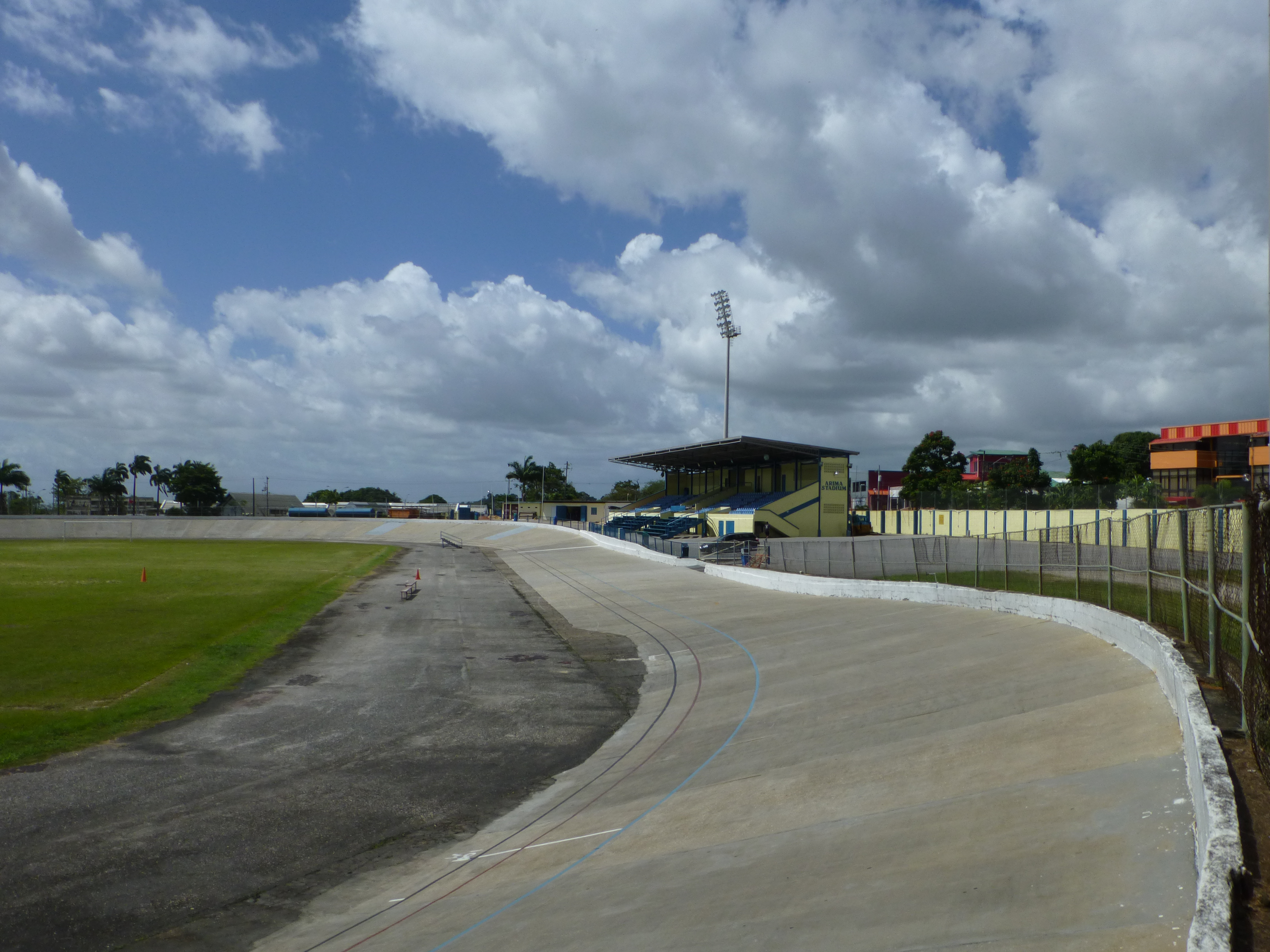
- Arima Velodrome (2014)
- Interactive map of Arima Velodrome
- Full name: Arima Velodrome
- Location: Corner Queen Mary and Hollis Avenue, Arima, Trinidad and Tobago
- Coordinates: 10°38′13″N 61°17′02″W
- Operator: Arima Borough Corporation
- Surface: Concrete and Grass

Tenant
- North East Stars

The Arima Velodrome is an outdoor velodrome in Arima, Trinidad and Tobago. The velodrome is an open outdoor velodrome serving the Borough of Arima and its suburbs. It hosts grass and concrete surface. From 2017 it was to become the home stadium for TT Pro League club North East Stars.

== See also ==
- List of cycling tracks and velodromes
