= Dean Pacheco =

Trinidad and Tobago footballer

Personal information
- Date of birth: 5 August 1972 (age 54)
- Place of birth: Carenage, Trinidad and Tobago
- Position: Midfielder

Youth career
- ECM Motown

Senior career*
Years	Team	Apps	(Gls)
- Superstar Rangers

International career
1991	Trinidad and Tobago U20	2	(0)
1993–1995	Trinidad and Tobago	5	(5)
- * Club domestic league appearances and goals

Dean Pacheco (born 5 August 1972) is a Trinidadian retired footballer.

== Career statistics ==
=== International ===
National team	Year	Apps	Goals
Trinidad and Tobago	1993	1	2
Trinidad and Tobago	1994	2	3
Trinidad and Tobago	1995	2	0
Total		5	5

=== International goals ===
Scores and results list Trinidad and Tobago's goal tally first.

No	Date	Venue	Opponent	Score	Result	Competition
1.	21 May 1993	Unknown	Saint Vincent and the Grenadines	?–?	4–1	1993 Caribbean Cup
2.	21 May 1993	Unknown	Saint Vincent and the Grenadines	?–?	4–1	1993 Caribbean Cup
3.	9 April 1994	Queen's Park Oval, Port of Spain, Trinidad and Tobago	Barbados	?–0	2–0	1994 Caribbean Cup
6.	17 April 1994	Queen's Park Oval, Port of Spain, Trinidad and Tobago	Martinique	?–?	7–2	1994 Caribbean Cup
7.	17 April 1994	Queen's Park Oval, Port of Spain, Trinidad and Tobago	Martinique	?–?	7–2	1994 Caribbean Cup
