= Paul Caligiuri =

American soccer player (born 1964)

Personal information
- Full name: Paul David Caligiuri
- Date of birth: March 9, 1964 (age 62)
- Place of birth: Westminster, California, United States
- Height: 5 ft 11 in (1.80 m)
- Position: Defensive midfielder

College career
Years	Team	Apps	(Gls)
1982–1985	UCLA Bruins		

Senior career*
Years	Team	Apps	(Gls)
1986	San Diego Nomads	10	(2)
1987–1988	Hamburger SV	0	(0)
1988–1990	SV Meppen	45	(1)
1991	Hansa Rostock	22	(0)
1991–1992	SC Freiburg	18	(0)
1995	Los Angeles Salsa		
1995–1996	→ FC St. Pauli (loan)	15	(0)
1996	Columbus Crew	25	(3)
1997–2001	Los Angeles Galaxy	136	(8)
Total		271	(14)

International career
1984–1997	United States	110	(5)

Managerial career
- 2002–2005: Cal Poly Pomona (women)
- 2002–2008: Cal Poly Pomona (men)
- 2017–: Orange County FC
Medal record
Representing United States
Winner	CONCACAF Gold Cup	1991
Runner-up	CONCACAF Championship	1989
Third place	CONCACAF Gold Cup	1996
Men's Soccer
- * Club domestic league appearances and goals

Paul David Caligiuri (born March 9, 1964) is an American former professional soccer player who played as a defensive midfielder.

Caligiuri's professional career spanned 16 years, during which he played for numerous teams in the United States and Germany, and for the U.S. national team. During his 14 years as a defender and defensive midfielder with the national team, he earned 110 caps and scored five goals.

Caligiuri is best remembered for his game-winning goal widely dubbed the "Shot heard round the world," which he scored in a 1–0 World Cup qualifier victory over Trinidad and Tobago on November 19, 1989. The victory qualified the United States for the 1990 FIFA World Cup in Italy, its first World Cup berth since 1950. There Caligiuri notched the first World Cup goal for the U.S. national team in 40 years, scoring in a 5–1 defeat against Czechoslovakia. He is a member of the National Soccer Hall of Fame.

== High school and college ==
Caligiuri was born in Westminster, California. After graduating from Walnut High School, he attended UCLA from 1982 to 1985. During his four seasons with the Bruins, he was twice named an NCAA All-American. He also captained the Bruins to an NCAA Championship his junior year.

== Club career ==
=== San Diego Nomads ===
After graduating from UCLA, Caligiuri played the 1986 season with the San Diego Nomads of the Western Soccer Alliance, earning the league's Most Valuable Player award. He was also named the 1986 U.S. Soccer Athlete of the Year.

=== Germany ===
Caligiuri's rookie professional accomplishments attracted the attention of German Bundesliga club Hamburger SV, who signed him after his appearance in the 1986 FIFA/UNICEF All Star Game.

In 1988, Hamburg transferred Caligiuri to SV Meppen of the German 2. Bundesliga, where he played for two seasons. From Meppen, he moved to FC Hansa Rostock in East Germany, with whom he would win the East German professional championship. From 1991 to 1992 he played for Second Bundesliga club SC Freiburg.

=== Los Angeles Salsa ===
On May 4, 1995, Caliguiri returned to the United States from Germany to sign with the Los Angeles Salsa of the American Professional Soccer League to gain match fitness before the U.S. national team's games that summer. (The Salsa played the season however in the USISL Pro League.) Caligiuri donated his entire salary from the Salsa to the victims of the Oklahoma City bombing.

==== Loan to St. Pauli ====
In August, the Salsa loaned Caligiuri to Bundesliga club FC St. Pauli, where he appeared in 14 games. In January 1996, the team elected not to exercise an option in Caligiuri's contract.

=== Major League Soccer ===
Caligiuri returned to the United States, where he signed with the emergent Major League Soccer. Despite Caligiuri's stated position that a contract clause that dictated he play for his hometown Los Angeles Galaxy, MLS allocated Caligiuri to the Columbus Crew. During his lone season with the Crew, he scored three goals. Caligiuri sued Major League Soccer to play for the LA Galaxy, and in March 1997 was placed with Los Angeles for the 1997 season, despite his high salary and the fact that the Galaxy were close to the salary cap. He played there until his 2001 retirement, finishing his MLS career with nine goals and 14 assists accumulated during 135 games, including 123 starts.

Caligiuri's final professional appearance was in the 2001 U.S. Open Cup final on October 27, 2001, where the LA Galaxy defeated New England Revolution 2–1 in extra time.

== International career ==
Caligiuri represented the U.S. at the 1983 Pan American Games. While at UCLA Caligiuri had earned his first cap for the national team, playing October 9, 1984 against El Salvador. Caligiuri eventually tallied 110 appearances for the United States, and scored five goals from his position in the midfield. Perhaps his biggest goal was in a 1989 World Cup qualifier in Trinidad and Tobago that gave the U.S. a 1–0 victory and sent the Americans to the World Cup finals for the first time in 40 years.

On March 14, 1990, Caligiuri signed a contract with USSF making him a full-time national team member. He remained on contract with USSF for several years. In 1993, he briefly considered moving to a British or German club after being omitted from the U.S. team's Gold Cup roster, but ultimately chose to dedicate himself to the national team as it prepared for the 1994 World Cup.

Caligiuri was a central figure in the national team from the 1980s through the mid-1990s, and started every U.S. match in both the 1990 and 1994 World Cups. In 1997, he played his final game for the national team.

Caligiuri played with the U.S. Futsal team in 1996, earning four caps and scoring one goal.

=== International goals ===
Scores and results list the United States' goal tally first, score column indicates score after each Caligiuri goal.

List of international goals scored by Paul Caligiuri
No.	Date	Venue	Opponent	Score	Result	Competition
1	May 19, 1985	Torrance, California	Trinidad and Tobago	1–0	1–0	1986 World Cup qualifying
2	November 19, 1989	Port of Spain, Trinidad and Tobago	Trinidad and Tobago	1–0	1–0	1990 World Cup qualifying
3	March 10, 1990	Tampa, Florida	Finland	1–0	2–1	Friendly
4	June 10, 1990	Florence, Italy	Czechoslovakia	1–3	1–5	1990 World Cup
5	May 28, 1995	Tampa, Florida	Costa Rica	1–1	1–2	Friendly

== Post-soccer career ==
Caligiuri was appointed head coach of both the men and women's soccer teams at Cal Poly Pomona before the beginning of their 2001 fall seasons, although he did not take over until 2002. He held the women's team's coaching position through the 2005 season and the men's team's coaching position through the end of the 2008 season. Later Caligiuri coached youth soccer for socal reds in Irvine, California as well as their UPSL team from 2023 to 2024.

== Personal life ==
In 2004, Caligiuri was inducted into the U.S. National Soccer Hall of Fame. He serves as an athlete representative on the board of directors of the United States Soccer Federation. Caligiuri coached a BU-19 and GU-14 team for California Football Academy in Mission Viejo, California. He is currently an Area Director for the Pateadores Soccer Club. He is also the Head Coach for the Orange County Football Club, Men's Semi-Pro soccer team in the NPSL (National Premier Soccer League). This was OCFC's first season in the league where they ended the season in a 1–0 loss in the Western Conference Final of the NPSL.

== See also ==
- List of men's footballers with 100 or more international caps
