= Danny Mueller =

American-born Puerto Rican footballer

Personal information
- Date of birth: October 5, 1966 (age 60)
- Place of birth: Glen Cove, Long Island, United States
- Height: 5 ft 6 in (1.68 m)
- Position: Midfielder

Senior career*
Years	Team	Apps	(Gls)
1994–1996	Long Island Rough Riders		
1998–1999	Staten Island Vipers	30	(6)

International career
- Puerto Rico
- * Club domestic league appearances and goals

Danny Mueller is a retired American-born, Puerto Rico association football midfielder who played professionally in the USL A-League and for the Puerto Rico national football team.

== Professional ==
In 1994, Mueller signed with the expansion Long Island Rough Riders of the USISL. He played three seasons with Long Island, winning the 1995 USISL Professional League with them. In 1998, Mueller joined the Staten Island Vipers. In 1999, Mueller began to reduce his time with the team as he began working as a painter. He retired at the end of the season.

== International ==
Mueller played for the Puerto Rico national football team in the 1993 Caribbean Cup as well as several qualification games for the cup.
