= Peter Prendergast =

Peter Prendergast may refer to:

- Peter Prendergast (referee) (born 1963), Jamaican football referee
- Peter Prendergast (artist) (1946–2007), Welsh landscape painter
- Peter Prendergast (hurler) (1924–1991), Irish hurler
