= 1994 Caribbean Cup =

Shell Caribbean Cup 1994

Tournament details
- Host country: Trinidad and Tobago
- Teams: 21 (from 1 confederation)

Final positions
- Champions: Trinidad and Tobago (3rd title)
- Runners-up: Martinique
- Third place: Guadeloupe
- Fourth place: Suriname

The 1994 Caribbean Cup (known as the Shell Caribbean Cup for sponsorship reasons) was the sixth edition of the Caribbean Cup, the football championship of the Caribbean, one of the CONCACAF zones. The final stage was hosted by Trinidad and Tobago.

== Entrants ==
- Anguilla
- Antigua and Barbuda
- Barbados
- British Virgin Islands
- Cayman Islands
- Cuba (Disqualified)
- Dominica
- Dominican Republic
- French Guiana
- Grenada
- Guadeloupe
- Guyana
- Haiti
- Jamaica
- Martinique (Defending Champions)
- Montserrat
- Puerto Rico
- Saint Kitts and Nevis
- Saint Vincent and the Grenadines
- Sint Maarten
- Suriname
- Trinidad and Tobago (Hosts)

== Qualifying tournament ==
- Martinique (holders) and Trinidad and Tobago (hosts) automatically qualified for the Final Round.

=== Regulation ===
An unusual rule was imposed in the qualifying tournament: every match was required to have a winner. If the two teams had the same score after 90 minutes, they played a sudden death extra time in which the golden goal was counted as two goals. If no team scored in the extra time, then a penalty shootout determined the winner.

=== Group 1 ===
Team	Pld	W	D	L	GF	GA	GD	Pts
Barbados	2	1	0	1	4	3	+1	3
Grenada	2	1	0	1	4	4	0	3
Puerto Rico	2	1	0	1	1	2	−1	3

Jan 23, 1994

Barbados	0–1	Puerto Rico

Jan 25, 1994

Grenada	2–0 (asdet)	Puerto Rico

Jan 27, 1994

Barbados	4–2 (asdet)	Grenada

==== Anomaly ====
Grenada went into the match with a superior goal difference, meaning that Barbados needed to win by at least two goals to progress to the finals. Barbados exploited two unusual rules variations in its final group stage game. First, unlike most group stages in football competitions, the organizers had deemed that all games must have a winner. All games drawn over 90 minutes would go to sudden death extra time. The second unusual rule stated that in sudden death extra time, the golden goal would count as two goals.

Barbados was leading 2–0 until the 83rd minute, when an own goal by a Bajan defender made the score 2–1 and brought a new ruling into play. Approaching the dying moments, the Barbadians realized they had little chance of scoring past Grenada's mass defense in the time available, so they deliberately scored an own goal to tie the game at 2–2. This would send the game into extra time and give them another half-hour to break down the defense. The Grenadians realized what was happening and attempted to score an own goal as well, which would put Barbados back in front by one goal and would eliminate Barbados from the competition.

The Barbados players started defending their opposition's net to prevent them from doing this, and during the game's last five minutes, Grenada tried to score in either net while Barbados defended both ends of the pitch. Barbados successfully held off Grenada for the final five minutes, sending the game into extra time. In extra time, Barbados scored the game winner, and was awarded a 4–2 victory, which put them through to the next round.

=== Group 2 ===
Played in Saint Vincent and the Grenadines.

Team	Pld	W	D	L	GF	GA	GD	Pts
Guadeloupe	2	2	0	0	11	0	+11	6
Saint Vincent and the Grenadines	2	1	0	1	2	2	0	3
Anguilla	2	0	0	2	0	11	−11	0

Guadeloupe	9–0	Anguilla

Saint Vincent and the Grenadines	2–0	Anguilla

Saint Vincent and the Grenadines	0–2	Guadeloupe

=== Group 3 ===
Played in Suriname

Team	Pld	W	D	L	GF	GA	GD	Pts
Suriname	2	2	0	0	4	0	+4	6
French Guiana	2	1	0	1	2	3	−1	3
Guyana	2	0	0	2	1	4	−3	0

Suriname	2–0 (asdet)	French Guiana

Guyana	1–1 (asdet) (4–5 pen.)	French Guiana

Suriname	2–0	Guyana

=== Group 4 ===
Played in Saint Kitts and Nevis

Team	Pld	W	D	L	GF	GA	GD	Pts
Dominica	2	2	0	0	7	4	+3	6
Saint Kitts and Nevis	2	1	0	1	11	5	+6	3
Antigua and Barbuda	2	1	0	1	10	3	+7	3
Montserrat	2	0	0	2	1	17	−16	0

Saint Kitts and Nevis	9–1	Montserrat

Dominica	3–2	Antigua and Barbuda

Saint Kitts and Nevis	2–4 (asdet)	Dominica

Antigua and Barbuda	8–0	Montserrat

Saint Kitts and Nevis	?–?	Antigua and Barbuda

The winner of this match should have had more goal difference than Dominica but since Dominica did appear in the final tournament, it is most likely that the match wasn't played at all.

Dominica	(cancelled)	Montserrat

The match between was cancelled because of crowd trouble.

=== Group 5 ===
Played in Cayman Islands

Team	Pld	W	D	L	GF	GA	GD	Pts
Cayman Islands	3	3	0	0	13	2	+11	9
Jamaica	3	2	0	1	18	5	+13	6
Sint Maarten	3	1	0	2	5	9	−4	3
British Virgin Islands	3	0	0	3	0	20	−20	0

Cayman Islands	5–0	British Virgin Islands

Jamaica	4–2 (asdet)	Sint Maarten

Cayman Islands	5–0	Sint Maarten

Jamaica	12–0	British Virgin Islands

Sint Maarten	3–0	British Virgin Islands

Cayman Islands	3–2	Jamaica

=== Group 6 ===
Pos	Team	Pts	Pld	W	D	L	GF	GA	GD
1	Haiti	3	1	1	0	0	1	0	+1
2	Dominican Republic	0	1	0	0	1	0	1	−1
3	Cuba (D)	0	0	0	0	0	0	0	0

(D) Disqualified

Cuba withdrew.

March 10

Dominican Republic	0–1	Haiti

== Final tournament ==
=== First round ===
Played in Trinidad and Tobago.

==== Group A ====
Team	Pld	W	D	L	GF	GA	GD	Pts
Trinidad and Tobago	3	2	1	0	7	0	+7	7
Guadeloupe	3	1	2	0	7	2	+5	5
Barbados	3	0	2	1	3	5	−2	2
Dominica	3	0	1	2	1	11	−10	1

7 April 1994

Barbados	1–1	Dominica

7 April 1994

Trinidad and Tobago	0–0	Guadeloupe

9 April 1994

Guadeloupe	5–0	Dominica

9 April 1994

Trinidad and Tobago	2–0	Barbados

Queen's Park Oval, Port of Spain

11 April 1994

Trinidad and Tobago	5–0	Dominica

11 April 1994

Guadeloupe	2–2	Barbados

==== Group B ====
Team	Pld	W	D	L	GF	GA	GD	Pts
Martinique	3	2	1	0	6	1	+5	7
Suriname	3	1	1	1	3	3	0	4
Haiti	3	1	1	1	4	6	−2	4
Cayman Islands	3	0	1	2	3	6	−3	1

7 April 1994

Haiti	3–2	Cayman Islands

Skinner Park, San Fernando
7 April 1994

Martinique	2–0	Suriname

Skinner Park, San Fernando

9 April 1994

Martinique	3–0	Haiti

Skinner Park, San Fernando
9 April 1994

Suriname	2–0	Cayman Islands

Skinner Park, San Fernando

11 April 1994

Martinique	1–1	Cayman Islands

Skinner Park, San Fernando
11 April 1994

Suriname	1–1	Haiti

Skinner Park, San Fernando

=== Semi-finals ===
14 April 1994

Trinidad and Tobago	3–2 (asdet)	Suriname
Faustin; Dwarika		Tol; Kampenaar

Queen's Park Oval, Port of Spain
14 April 1994

Martinique	4–2	Guadeloupe

Skinner Park, San Fernando

=== 3rd place match ===
16 April 1994

Guadeloupe	2–0	Suriname

Queen's Park Oval, Port of Spain,

=== Final ===
17 April 1994

Trinidad and Tobago	7–2	Martinique
Thomas 46'; Charles; Pacheco; Eve	report	Fondelot; Sophie

Queen's Park Oval, Port of Spain,

1994 Caribbean Cup winner

Trinidad and Tobago
Third title

== Haiti national team defection attempt ==
Many in the Haitian national team did not want to return to Haiti following the events of the 1991 Haitian coup d'état, where Army General Raoul Cédras had led a military coup. Several Haitian players had criticized the coup d'état on a Miami-based radio station, and their messages had been played in Haiti.

Guy Delva, a journalist who was reporting on the Haitian players at the time said, "I'm wondering if they really understand the gravity of the statements they made," and it was felt by some that the players and their immediate families were in danger.

Following the Haitian team's exit from the competition, sixteen members of the national football team sought political asylum at the U.S. Embassy in Port of Spain on 14 April. They were told by embassy officials to apply from Haiti or the United States. Goalkeeper Jacques Tomaney claimed that six of his friends had already been killed in Haiti. Upon being told to return to Haiti, defender Patrick Nertilus said "We are very happy to be going home. We are the stars in our country".
