= 1992 Caribbean Cup =

Shell Caribbean Cup

Tournament details
- Host country: Trinidad and Tobago
- Dates: 17–27 June 1992
- Teams: 8

Final positions
- Champions: Trinidad and Tobago (2nd title)
- Runners-up: Jamaica
- Third place: Martinique
- Fourth place: Cuba

Tournament statistics
- Matches played: 16
- Goals scored: 38 (2.38 per match)

The 1992 Caribbean Cup, known as the Shell Caribbean Cup for sponsorship reasons, was the 10th international association football championship for members of the Caribbean Football Union (CFU). It was the fourth edition of the Caribbean Cup which replaced the CFU Championship. Hosted by Trinidad and Tobago, the competition ran from 17–27 June 1992 and was contested by the national teams of Antigua and Barbuda, Cuba, Guadeloupe, Jamaica, Martinique, Saint Vincent and the Grenadines, Suriname and Trinidad and Tobago.

The final tournament began with the first matches in the group stage on 17 June 1992 and ended with the final on 27 June 1992. In a replay of the previous year's final, Trinidad and Tobago defeated Jamaica 3–1 in the final to win the competition for the second time.

== Background ==
The Caribbean Football Union (CFU) was founded in January 1978 as a sub-confederation of the Confederation of North, Central America and Caribbean Association Football (CONCACAF). Later the same year, the first CFU Championship was organised in Trinidad and Tobago. The competition was held semi-regularly until the final edition in 1988. From 1989, it was replaced by the Caribbean Cup.

The tournament was sponsored by Royal Dutch Shell following the input of employees of Shell Antilles and Gulanas Ltd.

Jamaica were the defending champions after winning the previous edition as hosts. Both Jamaica and Trinidad and Tobago had won the competition once from the first three editions, one of which was unfinished.

== Format ==
A qualifying tournament was held to determine six of the eight teams that would participate in the final tournament. Hosts Trinidad and Tobago and holders Jamaica qualified automatically. The 20 competing teams were drawn into six groups of two, three or four teams. The groups of three or four teams were played as a single round-robin where each team would play all of the others once. The winner of each group would qualify for the final tournament. The group of two teams was played as a two-legged tie and the team scoring more goals on aggregate would qualify for the final tournament.

For the final tournament, the eight teams were drawn into two groups of four teams. Each group was played as a single round-robin where each team would play all of the others once. The winners and runners-up of each group would contest the semi-finals with the winners advancing to the final and the losers contesting the third-place play-off.

=== Participants ===
- Antigua and Barbuda
- Aruba
- Anguilla
- Barbados
- British Virgin Islands
- Cayman Islands
- Cuba
- Dominica
- French Guiana
- Guadeloupe
- Grenada
- Guyana
- Jamaica
- Martinique
- Montserrat
- Netherlands Antilles
- Saint Kitts and Nevis
- Saint Lucia
- Saint Vincent and the Grenadines
- Sint Maarten
- Suriname
- Trinidad and Tobago

== Qualifying tournament ==
=== Group 1 ===
Qualifying group 1 was held in Barbados. Saint Vincent and the Grenadines qualified as group winners after defeating Barbados 3–2 in their final match.

==== Table ====
| Pos | Team | Pld | W | D | L | GF | GA | GD | Pts | Qualification |
|---|---|---|---|---|---|---|---|---|---|---|
| 1 | Saint Vincent and the Grenadines | 3 | 1 | 2 | 0 | 5 | 4 | +1 | 4 | Qualification to 1992 Caribbean Cup |
| 2 | Barbados | 3 | 1 | 1 | 1 | 4 | 4 | 0 | 3 | |
| 3 | Netherlands Antilles | 3 | 1 | 1 | 1 | 3 | 3 | 0 | 3 | |
| 4 | Grenada | 3 | 0 | 2 | 1 | 1 | 2 | −1 | 2 | |

==== Results ====
| Barbados | 1–1 | Grenada |

| Saint Vincent and the Grenadines | 2–2 | Netherlands Antilles |

| Barbados | 1–0 | Netherlands Antilles |

| Saint Vincent and the Grenadines | 0–0 | Grenada |

| Barbados | 2–3 | Saint Vincent and the Grenadines |

| Grenada | 0–1 | Netherlands Antilles |

=== Group 2 ===
Qualifying group 2 was held in Sint Maarten. Martinique qualified as group winners on goal difference after a 1–1 draw with Sint Maarten in their final match.

==== Table ====
| Pos | Team | Pld | W | D | L | GF | GA | GD | Pts | Qualification |
|---|---|---|---|---|---|---|---|---|---|---|
| 1 | Martinique | 2 | 1 | 1 | 0 | 8 | 1 | +7 | 3 | Qualification to 1992 Caribbean Cup |
| 2 | Sint Maarten | 2 | 1 | 1 | 0 | 5 | 3 | +2 | 3 | |
| 3 | Cayman Islands | 2 | 0 | 0 | 2 | 2 | 11 | −9 | 0 | |

==== Results ====
| Martinique | 7–0 | Cayman Islands |

| Sint Maarten | 4–2 | Cayman Islands |

| Sint Maarten | 1–1 | Martinique |

=== Group 3 ===
Qualifying group 3 was held in Suriname. Suriname qualified as group winners after defeating French Guiana 3–2 in their final match.

==== Table ====
| Pos | Team | Pld | W | D | L | GF | GA | GD | Pts | Qualification |
|---|---|---|---|---|---|---|---|---|---|---|
| 1 | Suriname | 3 | 3 | 0 | 0 | 12 | 2 | +10 | 6 | Qualification to 1992 Caribbean Cup |
| 2 | French Guiana | 3 | 1 | 1 | 1 | 5 | 4 | +1 | 3 | |
| 3 | Guyana | 3 | 1 | 1 | 1 | 4 | 5 | −1 | 3 | |
| 4 | Aruba | 3 | 0 | 0 | 3 | 0 | 10 | −10 | 0 | |

==== Results ====
| Suriname | 5–0 | Aruba |

| French Guiana | 1–1 | Guyana |

| Suriname | 4–0 | Guyana |

| French Guiana | 2–0 | Aruba |

| Suriname | 3–2 | French Guiana |

| Guyana | 3–0 | Aruba |

=== Group 4 ===
Qualifying group 4 was held in Saint Kitts and Nevis. Antigua and Barbuda qualified as group winners after defeating Saint Kitts and Nevis 1–0 in their final match. The match between the British Virgin Islands and Montserrat was not played but the outcome would not have affected which team qualified.

==== Table ====
| Pos | Team | Pld | W | D | L | GF | GA | GD | Pts | Qualification |
|---|---|---|---|---|---|---|---|---|---|---|
| 1 | Antigua and Barbuda | 3 | 3 | 0 | 0 | 8 | 0 | +8 | 6 | Qualification to 1992 Caribbean Cup |
| 2 | Saint Kitts and Nevis | 3 | 2 | 0 | 1 | 14 | 1 | +13 | 4 | |
| 3 | British Virgin Islands | 2 | 0 | 0 | 2 | 0 | 6 | −6 | 0 | |
| 4 | Montserrat | 2 | 0 | 0 | 2 | 0 | 15 | −15 | 0 | |

==== Results ====
| Saint Kitts and Nevis | 4–0 | British Virgin Islands |

| Antigua and Barbuda | 5–0 | Montserrat |

| Saint Kitts and Nevis | 10–0 | Montserrat |

| Antigua and Barbuda | 2–0 | British Virgin Islands |

| Saint Kitts and Nevis | 0–1 | Antigua and Barbuda |

| Montserrat | Not played | British Virgin Islands |

=== Group 5 ===
Qualifying group 5 was held in Saint Lucia. Guadeloupe qualified as group winners after defeating Saint Lucia 2–0 in their final match.

==== Table ====
| Pos | Team | Pld | W | D | L | GF | GA | GD | Pts | Qualification |
|---|---|---|---|---|---|---|---|---|---|---|
| 1 | Guadeloupe | 2 | 1 | 1 | 0 | 2 | 0 | +2 | 3 | Qualification to 1992 Caribbean Cup |
| 2 | Dominica | 2 | 0 | 2 | 0 | 1 | 1 | 0 | 2 | |
| 3 | Saint Lucia | 2 | 0 | 1 | 1 | 1 | 3 | −2 | 1 | |

==== Results ====
| Guadeloupe | 0–0 | Dominica |

| Saint Lucia | 1–1 | Dominica |

| Saint Lucia | 0–2 | Guadeloupe |

=== Group 6 ===
Cuba won both legs of their tie with Anguilla to qualify for the final tournament.

Qualifying group 6
| Team 1 | Agg. | Team 2 | 1st leg | 2nd leg |
|---|---|---|---|---|
| Anguilla | 0–8 | Cuba | 0–3 | 0–5 |

==== Results ====
| Anguilla | 0–3 | Cuba |

| Cuba | 5–0 | Anguilla |

Cuba won 8–0 on aggregate.

== Final tournament ==
=== Group stage ===
==== Group A ====
In group A, Trinidad and Tobago advanced to the semi-finals as group winners after winning all three of their matches. Martinique also advanced as runners-up after defeating Antigua and Barbuda 4–1 in their final match.

===== Table =====
| Pos | Team | Pld | W | D | L | GF | GA | GD | Pts | Qualification |
|---|---|---|---|---|---|---|---|---|---|---|
| 1 | Trinidad and Tobago | 3 | 3 | 0 | 0 | 10 | 1 | +9 | 6 | Qualification to the semi-finals |
| 2 | Martinique | 3 | 2 | 0 | 1 | 9 | 4 | +5 | 4 | Qualification to the semi-finals |
| 3 | Suriname | 3 | 0 | 1 | 2 | 2 | 6 | −4 | 1 | |
| 4 | Antigua and Barbuda | 3 | 0 | 1 | 2 | 2 | 12 | −10 | 1 | |

===== Results =====
17 June 1992

| Suriname | 1–1 | Antigua and Barbuda |

17 June 1992

| Trinidad and Tobago | 2–1 | Martinique |

19 June 1992

| Martinique | 4–1 | Antigua and Barbuda |

19 June 1992

| Trinidad and Tobago | 1–0 | Suriname |

21 June 1992

| Martinique | 4–1 | Suriname |

21 June 1992

| Trinidad and Tobago | 7–0 | Antigua and Barbuda |

==== Group B ====
In group B, Cuba and Jamaica advanced to the semi-finals after they drew goalless in their final match. Both teams ended with a record of two wins and one draw, scored three, conceded zero. It is not known what criteria was used to decide the group winner.

===== Table =====
| Pos | Team | Pld | W | D | L | GF | GA | GD | Pts | Qualification |
|---|---|---|---|---|---|---|---|---|---|---|
| 1 | Jamaica | 3 | 2 | 1 | 0 | 3 | 0 | +3 | 5 | Qualification to the semi-finals |
| 2 | Cuba | 3 | 2 | 1 | 0 | 3 | 0 | +3 | 5 | Qualification to the semi-finals |
| 3 | Guadeloupe | 3 | 1 | 0 | 2 | 1 | 3 | −2 | 2 | |
| 4 | Saint Vincent and the Grenadines | 3 | 0 | 0 | 3 | 0 | 4 | −4 | 0 | |

===== Results =====
17 June 1992

| Guadeloupe | 1–0 | Saint Vincent and the Grenadines |

17 June 1992

| Jamaica | 0–0 | Cuba |

19 June 1992

| Cuba | 1–0 | Saint Vincent and the Grenadines |

19 June 1992

| Jamaica | 1–0 | Guadeloupe |

21 June 1992

| Cuba | 2–0 | Guadeloupe |

21 June 1992

| Jamaica | 2–0 | Saint Vincent and the Grenadines |

=== Knockout phase ===
Knockout phase
| Team 1 | Score | Team 2 |
|---|---|---|
Semi-finals
| Jamaica | 1–0 | Martinique |
| Trinidad and Tobago | 1–0 | Cuba |
Third-place play-off
| Martinique | 1–1 (a.e.t.) (5–3 p) | Cuba |
Final
| Trinidad and Tobago | 3–1 | Jamaica |

==== Semi-finals ====
Group winners Jamaica and Trinidad and Tobago both advanced to the final after defeating Martinique and Cuba respectively.

24 June 1992

| Jamaica | 1–0 | Martinique |
|---|---|---|
| Reid 78' |

24 June 1992

| Trinidad and Tobago | 1–0 | Cuba |
|---|---|---|
| Lewis |

==== Third-place play-off ====
Martinique defeated Cuba on penalties to finish third.

27 June 1992

| Martinique | 1–1 (a.e.t.) | Cuba |
Penalties
| | 5–3 |

Port of Spain

==== Final ====
Goals from Leonson Lewis, Russell Latapy and Clint Marcelle helped Trinidad and Tobago to a 3–1 win as they won the competition for the second time.

27 June 1992

| Trinidad and Tobago | 3–1 | Jamaica |
|---|---|---|
| Lewis 19'; Latapy 37'; Marcelle 85' | | Graham 49' |

Port of Spain
Attendance: 29,000
