= Hutson Charles =

Trinidad and Tobago footballer

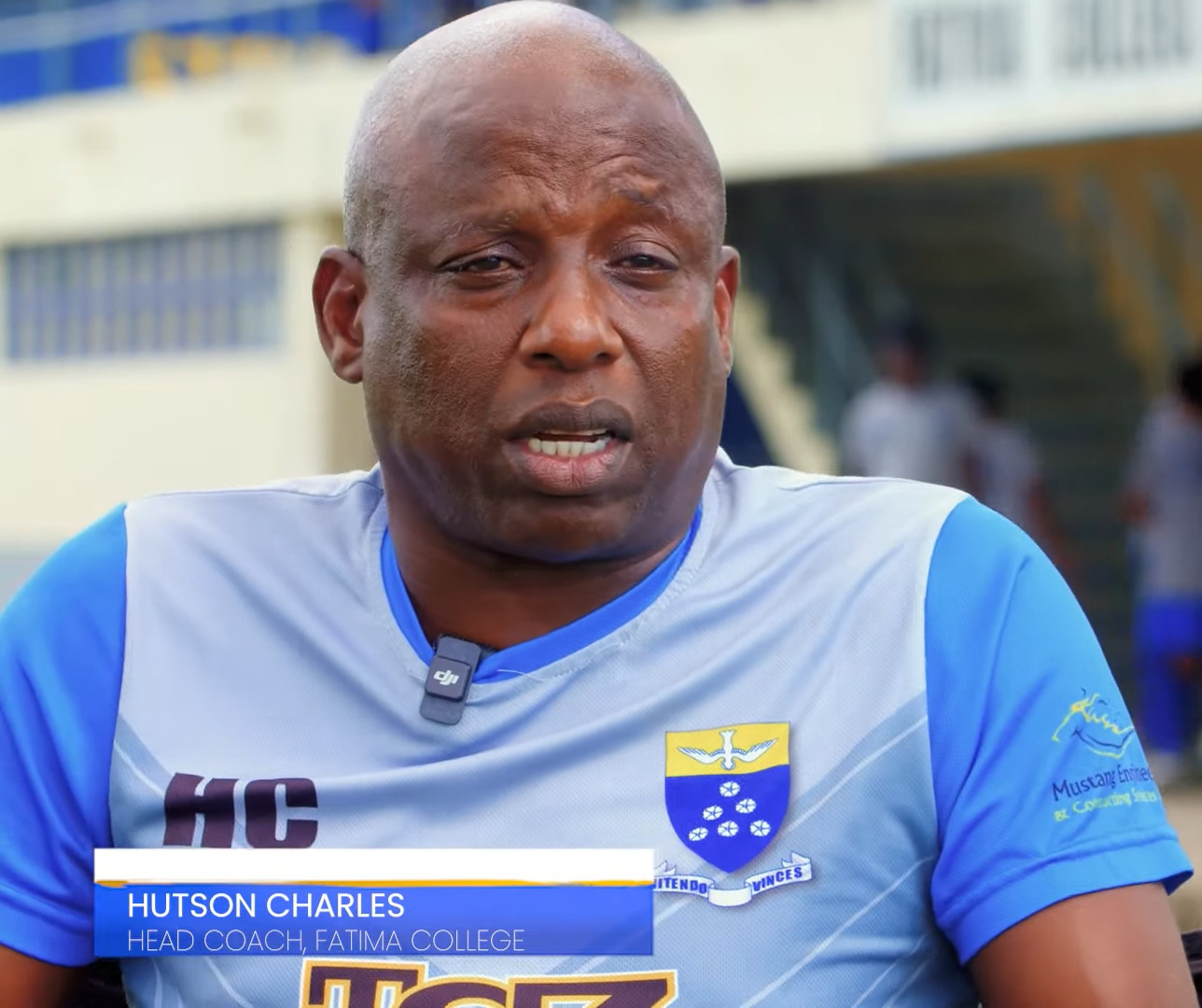
- Charles as coach of Fatima College in 2024

Personal information
- Full name: Hutson Brent Charles
- Date of birth: 16 September 1965 (age 61)
- Place of birth: Port of Spain, Trinidad and Tobago
- Position: Midfielder

Senior career*
Years	Team	Apps	(Gls)
1983–2000	Defence Force		

International career
1988–2000	Trinidad and Tobago	35	(8)

Managerial career
- 2012–2013: Trinidad and Tobago (joint)
- * Club domestic league appearances and goals

Hutson Brent Charles (born 16 September 1965) is a Trinidadian retired footballer who played as a midfielder. Charles is also known as "Baba".

As a player, he represented Defence Force. Charles participated in Trinidad's 1990, 1994 and 1998 FIFA World Cup qualifying campaigns. He was also named in Trinidad and Tobago's 1992 and 1994 Caribbean Cup winning squads, scoring two goals in the final of the latter.
