= Leonson Lewis =

Trinidadian footballer (born 1966)

Personal information
- Full name: Leonson Edward Jeffrey Lewis
- Date of birth: 30 December 1966 (age 59)
- Place of birth: Port of Spain, Trinidad and Tobago
- Height: 1.80 m (5 ft 11 in)
- Position: Striker

Senior career*
Years	Team	Apps	(Gls)
1986–1989	W Connection		
1989–1990	Portmore United		
1990–1994	Académica	120	(42)
1994–1996	Felgueiras	68	(25)
1997	Boavista	8	(2)
1997–1998	Chaves	26	(2)
1998–2000	Estrela Amadora	48	(4)
2000–2002	União Lamas	45	(7)
2002–2003	W Connection	2	(2)
Total		317	(84)

International career
1988–1996	Trinidad and Tobago	31	(21)
- * Club domestic league appearances and goals

Leonson Edward Jeffrey Lewis (born 30 December 1966 in Port of Spain) is a Trinidad and Tobago retired footballer who played as a striker.

== International Goals ==
Scores and results list Trinidad and Tobago's goal tally first, score column indicates score after each Lewis goal.

List of international goals scored by Leonson Lewis
No.	Date	Venue	Opponent	Score	Result	Competition
1	16 June 1989	Queen's Park Oval, Port of Spain, Trinidad and Tobago	Peru	1-0	2-1	Friendly
2	30 July 1989	Queen's Park Oval, Port of Spain, Trinidad and Tobago	El Salvador	1-0	2-0	1989 CONCACAF Championship
3	30 July 1989	Queen's Park Oval, Port of Spain, Trinidad and Tobago	El Salvador	2-0	2-0	1989 CONCACAF Championship
4	23 May 1991	National Stadium, Kingston, Jamaica	Dominican Republic	—	7-0	1991 Caribbean Cup
5	23 May 1991	National Stadium, Kingston, Jamaica	Dominican Republic	—	7-0	1991 Caribbean Cup
6	29 June 1991	Rose Bowl, Pasadena, United States of America	United States	1-0	1-2	1991 CONCACAF Gold Cup
7	1 July 1991	Rose Bowl, Pasadena, United States of America	Costa Rica	1-1	2-1	1991 CONCACAF Gold Cup
8	31 May 1992	Queen's Park Oval, Port of Spain, Trinidad and Tobago	Barbados	3-0	3-0	1994 FIFA World Cup qualification
9	17 June 1992	Hasely Crawford Stadium, Port of Spain, Trinidad and Tobago	Martinique	—	2-1	1992 Caribbean Cup
10	19 June 1992	Hasely Crawford Stadium, Port of Spain, Trinidad and Tobago	Suriname	1-0	1-0	1992 Caribbean Cup
11	21 June 1992	Hasely Crawford Stadium, Port of Spain, Trinidad and Tobago	Antigua and Barbuda	—	7-0	1992 Caribbean Cup
12	21 June 1992	Hasely Crawford Stadium, Port of Spain, Trinidad and Tobago	Antigua and Barbuda	—	7-0	1992 Caribbean Cup
13	21 June 1992	Hasely Crawford Stadium, Port of Spain, Trinidad and Tobago	Antigua and Barbuda	—	7-0	1992 Caribbean Cup
14	24 June 1992	Hasely Crawford Stadium, Port of Spain, Trinidad and Tobago	Cuba	1-0	1-0	1992 Caribbean Cup
15	26 June 1992	Hasely Crawford Stadium, Port of Spain, Trinidad and Tobago	Jamaica	1-0	3-1	1992 Caribbean Cup
16	19 November 1994	Hasely Crawford Stadium, Port of Spain, Trinidad and Tobago	United States	1-0	1-0	Friendly
17	21 July 1995	Jarrett Park, Montego Bay, Jamaica	Saint Lucia	—	5-0	1995 Caribbean Cup
18	21 July 1995	Jarrett Park, Montego Bay, Jamaica	Saint Lucia	—	5-0	1995 Caribbean Cup
19	28 July 1995	Truman Bodden Sports Complex, George Town, Cayman Islands	Cayman Islands	—	9-2	1995 Caribbean Cup
20	28 July 1995	Truman Bodden Sports Complex, George Town, Cayman Islands	Cayman Islands	—	9-2	1995 Caribbean Cup
21	28 July 1995	Truman Bodden Sports Complex, George Town, Cayman Islands	Cayman Islands	—	9-2	1995 Caribbean Cup
