= Philibert Jones =

Trinidad and Tobago footballer (born 1964)

Personal information
- Full name: Philibert Theodore Jones
- Date of birth: 12 November 1964 (age 61)
- Place of birth: San Fernando, Trinidad and Tobago
- Position: Forward

Team information
- Current team: United Petrotrin (assistant)

Senior career*
Years	Team	Apps	(Gls)
1990–1993	United Petrotrin		
1994–1996	Charlotte Eagles		
1997–1998	United Petrotrin		
2000	Charlotte Eagles	4	(0)

International career
- Trinidad and Tobago

Managerial career
- 2008–: United Petrotrin (assistant)
- * Club domestic league appearances and goals

Philibert Jones (born 12 November 1964) is a Trinidad and Tobago former footballer who played as a forward who is an assistant coach at United Petrotrin in the TT Pro League.

== Career ==
Amongst Jones' professional clubs was the Charlotte Eagles in the United States, where he scored 18 goals in the 1996 season. Jones also played for United Petrotrin in Trinidad.

Jones also played at international level for the Trinidad and Tobago national team, and participated at a number of tournaments including the 1989 Caribbean Championship, and the 1991 CONCACAF Gold Cup. He also appeared in FIFA World Cup qualifying matches.

== Personal life ==
His nephew is former footballer Kenwyne Jones.
