= 2002 FIFA World Cup qualification – CONCACAF Caribbean Zone =

Football tournament qualification stage

The CONCACAF Caribbean Zone of 2002 FIFA World Cup qualification was contested between 24 CONCACAF members located in the Caribbean area.

The 24 teams were divided into three groups of eight teams each. The teams would play in a knockout tournament, with matches on a home-and-away basis. The winners would advance to the semi-final round. The runners-up would advance to the play-offs.

== Group 1 ==
First round
Cuba	4	0	4
Cayman Islands	0	0	0
Saint Lucia	1	0	1 (1)
Suriname (p)	0	1	1 (3)
Aruba	4	2	6
Puerto Rico	2	2	4
Barbados (a.e.t.)	2	3	5
Grenada	2	2	4

Second round
Cuba	1	0	1
Suriname	0	0	0
Aruba	1	0	1
Barbados	3	4	7

Third round
Cuba	1	1	2 (4)
Barbados (p)	1	1	2 (5)

=== First round ===
March 5, 2000

Cuba	4–0	Cayman Islands
Marten 38'; Álvarez 56'; Prado 87'; Gandara 90'	Report

Estadio Pedro Marrero, Havana
Attendance: 3,500
Referee: Hughil Thompson (Jamaica)
March 19, 2000

Cayman Islands	0–0	Cuba
	Report

Truman Bodden Stadium, George Town
Attendance: 800
Referee: Ibrahim Brohim (Dominica)

Cuba won 4–0 on aggregate and advanced to the second round.

March 5, 2000

Saint Lucia	1–0	Suriname
Regis 46'	Report

Mindoo Philip Park, Castries
Attendance: 3,500
Referee: Noel Egan (Antigua and Barbuda)

March 19, 2000

Suriname	1–0 (a.e.t.)	Saint Lucia
Doesburg 80'	Report
Penalties
	3–1

André Kamperveen Stadion, Paramaribo
Attendance: 8,000
Referee: Harlem Villar (Aruba)

1–1 on aggregate. Suriname won 3–1 on penalties and advanced to the second round.

March 11, 2000

Aruba	4–2	Puerto Rico
Gross 47'; Filomina 54', 70'; Mackay 85'	Report	Ortiz 12'; Astondoa 43'

Trinidad Stadium, Oranjestad
Attendance: 800
Referee: Roger Gurley (Saint Vincent and the Grenadines)
March 18, 2000

Puerto Rico	2–2	Aruba
Ortiz 7'; Geerman 19' (o.g.)	Report	Mackay 37'; Kross 43'

Estadio Sixto Escobar, San Juan
Attendance: 500
Referee: Urvin Faneijte (Netherlands Antilles)

Aruba won 6–4 on aggregate and advanced to the second round.

March 5, 2000

Barbados	2–2	Grenada
Alexander 31', 47'	Report	Modeste 75', 77'

Barbados National Stadium, Bridgetown
Attendance: 4,500
Referee: Franklyn Dorset (Saint Kitts and Nevis)
March 18, 2000

Grenada	2–3 (a.e.t.)	Barbados
Babb 45+2' (o.g.); Fletcher 61'	Report	Cox 20'; Forde 36'; Riley 96'

Grenada National Stadium, St. George's
Attendance: 3,000
Referee: Ramesh Ramdhan (Trinidad and Tobago)

Barbados won 5–4 on aggregate and advanced to the second round.

=== Second round ===
April 1, 2000

Aruba	1–3	Barbados
Gross 89'	Report	Riley 2'; Alexander 22', 85'

Trinidad Stadium, Oranjestad
Attendance: 1,200
Referee: Timothy Hazelwood (Saint Vincent and the Grenadines)
April 16, 2000

Barbados	4–0	Aruba
Alexander 45', 67'; Goodridge 47'; Riley 70'	Report

Barbados National Stadium, Bridgetown
Attendance: 1,755
Referee: Ramesh Ramdhan (Trinidad and Tobago)

Barbados won 7–1 on aggregate and advanced to the third round.

April 2, 2000

Cuba	1–0	Suriname
Hernández 19'	Report

Estadio Pedro Marrero, Havana
Attendance: 3,000
Referee: Peter Prendergast (Jamaica)
April 16, 2000

Suriname	0–0	Cuba
	Report

André Kamperveen Stadion, Paramaribo
Attendance: 8,000
Referee: Wilson Saint-Claire (Haiti)

Cuba won 1–0 on aggregate and advanced to the third round.

=== Third round ===
May 7, 2000

Cuba	1–1	Barbados
More 45'	Report	Riley 16'

Estadio Pedro Marrero, Havana
Attendance: 5,000
Referee: Richard Samuel (Dominican Republic)
May 21, 2000

Barbados	1–1 (a.e.t.)	Cuba
Cruzata 74' (o.g.)	Report	More 73'
Penalties
	5–4

Barbados National Stadium, Bridgetown
Attendance: 7,000
Referee: Noel Bynoe (Trinidad and Tobago)

2–2 on aggregate. Barbados won 5–4 on penalties and advanced to the semi-finals. Cuba advanced to the play-offs.

== Group 2 ==
First round
Antigua and Barbuda (w/o)
Guyana
British Virgin Islands	1	0	1
Bermuda	5	9	14
Saint Vincent and the Grenadines	9	5	14
U.S. Virgin Islands	0	1	1
Saint Kitts and Nevis	8	6	14
Turks and Caicos Islands	0	0	0

Second round
Antigua and Barbuda (a)	0	1	1
Bermuda	0	1	1
Saint Vincent and the Grenadines	1	2	3
Saint Kitts and Nevis	0	1	1

Third round
Antigua and Barbuda	2	0	2
Saint Vincent and the Grenadines	1	4	5

=== First round ===
Guyana were suspended by FIFA, thus Antigua and Barbuda obtained a bye to the second round.

March 5, 2000

Saint Vincent and the Grenadines	9–0	U.S. Virgin Islands
Jack 6', 15', 48'; Guy 18', 20', 31'; Chewitt 74', 86'; Gonsalves 81'	Report

Arnos Vale Stadium, Kingstown
Attendance: 4,000
Referee: Floyd Alexander (Saint Lucia)
March 19, 2000

U.S. Virgin Islands	1–5	Saint Vincent and the Grenadines
Santos 72'	Report	Gonsalves 7'; Chewitt 15', 35', 51', 89'

Paul Joseph Stadium, Frederiksted
Attendance: 425
Referee: Mark Forde (Barbados)

Saint Vincent and the Grenadines won 14–1 on aggregate and advanced to the second round.

March 18, 2000

Saint Kitts and Nevis	8–0	Turks and Caicos Islands
Saddler 22', 53' (pen.), 66'; Isaac 29'; Francis 47'; Crawford 50'; Gumbs 75'; Smith 86'	Report

Warner Park, Basseterre
Attendance: 853
Referee: Leroy Bryan (Anguilla)
March 21, 2000

Turks and Caicos Islands	0–6	Saint Kitts and Nevis
	Report	Huggins 20', 62'; Gumbs 30' (pen.); Isaac 58'; Francis 69'; Smith 73'

Warner Park, Basseterre
Attendance: 1,000
Referee: Ian Phillips (Cayman Islands)

Saint Kitts and Nevis won 14–0 on aggregate and advanced to the second round.

March 5, 2000

British Virgin Islands	1–5	Bermuda
Williams 61'	Report	Lightbourne 20'; Cann 22'; Goater 35', 48', 65' (pen.)

Sherly Ground, Road Town
Attendance: 450
Referee: Caudel McNabb (Bahamas)
March 19, 2000

Bermuda	9–0	British Virgin Islands
Boyles 6'; Russell 34'; Wade 53'; Burgess 57' (pen.); Lewis 60'; Astwood 61', 79'; Nusum 75', 89'	Report

Bermuda National Stadium, Hamilton
Attendance: 1,200
Referee: Rosnick Grant (Haiti)

Bermuda won 14–1 on aggregate and advanced to the second round.

=== Second round ===
April 16, 2000

Antigua and Barbuda	0–0	Bermuda
	Report

Antigua Recreation Ground, St. John's
Attendance: 1,040
Referee: Martin Charles (Dominica)
April 23, 2000

Bermuda	1–1	Antigua and Barbuda
Burgess 60'	Report	Grayson 74'

Bermuda National Stadium, Hamilton
Attendance: 2,000
Referee: Alexander Williams (Saint Lucia)

1–1 on aggregate. Antigua and Barbuda advanced to the third round on away goals.

April 16, 2000

Saint Vincent and the Grenadines	1–0	Saint Kitts and Nevis
James 82'	Report

Arnos Vale Stadium, Kingstown
Attendance: 5,800
Referee: Noel Egan (Antigua and Barbuda)
April 22, 2000

Saint Kitts and Nevis	1–2	Saint Vincent and the Grenadines
Gumbs 65'	Report	Jack 18'; Velox 58'

Warner Park, Basseterre
Attendance: 3,500
Referee: Noel Bynoe (Trinidad and Tobago)

Saint Vincent and the Grenadines won 3–1 on aggregate and advanced to the third round.

=== Third round ===
May 7, 2000

Antigua and Barbuda	2–1	Saint Vincent and the Grenadines
Grayson 20', 64'	Report	Skeal 68' (o.g.)

Antigua Recreation Ground, St. John's, Antigua and Barbuda
Attendance: 3,000
Referee: Ramesh Ramdhan (Trinidad and Tobago)
May 21, 2000

Saint Vincent and the Grenadines	4–0	Antigua and Barbuda
John 11'; Charles 50'; Guy 56', 61'	Report

Arnos Vale Stadium, Kingstown,
Attendance: 5,000
Referee: Mark Forde (Barbados)

Saint Vincent and the Grenadines won 5–2 on aggregate and advanced to the semi-finals. Antigua and Barbuda advanced to the play-offs.

== Group 3 ==
First round
Trinidad and Tobago	5	1	6
Netherlands Antilles	0	1	1
Dominican Republic	3	3	6
Montserrat	0	1	1
Haiti	4	3	7
Dominica	0	1	1
Anguilla	1	1	2
Bahamas	3	2	5

Second round
Trinidad and Tobago	3	1	4
Dominican Republic	0	0	0
Haiti	9	4	13
Bahamas	0	0	0

Third round
Trinidad and Tobago	3	1	4
Haiti	1	1	2

=== First round ===
March 4, 2000

Trinidad and Tobago	5–0	Netherlands Antilles
Andrews 19'; Eve 43', 57'; Dwarika 63', 85'	Report

Hasley Crawford Stadium, Port of Spain
Attendance: 12,435
Referee: Argelio Sabillon (Honduras)
March 18, 2000

Netherlands Antilles	1–1	Trinidad and Tobago
Martina 41'	Report	Andrews 90+2'

Stadion Ergilio Hato, Willemstad
Attendance: 200
Referee: Peter Prendergast (Jamaica)

Trinidad and Tobago won 6–1 on aggregate and advanced to the second round.

March 5, 2000

Dominican Republic	3–0	Montserrat
Zapata 31'; Pérez 38'; Reyes 44'	Report

Estadio San Cristóbal, San Cristóbal
Attendance: 2,000
Referee: Luis Yero (Cuba)
March 19, 2000

Montserrat	1–3	Dominican Republic
Dyer 83'	Report	Sanchez 43'; Gregorio 66'; Zapata 76'

Hasley Crawford Stadium, Port of Spain
Attendance: 50
Referee: Lazaro Rojas (Cuba)

Dominican Republic won 6–1 on aggregate and advanced to the second round.

March 11, 2000

Haiti	4–0	Dominica
Pierre 6', 22', 47'; Menelas 42'	Report

Stade Sylvio Cator, Port-au-Prince
Attendance: 16,000
Referee: Samuel Richard (Dominican Republic)
March 19, 2000

Dominica	1–3	Haiti
Peters 6'	Report	Pierre 56', 87'; Desir 69'

Windsor Park, Roseau
Attendance: 2,000
Referee: Lenfort Levy (Puerto Rico)

Haiti won 7–1 on aggregate and advanced to the second round.

March 5, 2000

Anguilla	1–3	Bahamas
Hughes 69' (pen.)	Report	Haven 12'; Moussis 29'; Davies 32'

Webster Park, The Valley
Attendance: 250
Referee: Stuart Crockwell (Bermuda)
March 19, 2000

Bahamas	2–1	Anguilla
Haven 16'; Davies 77'	Report	O'Connor 40' (pen.)

Thomas Robinson Stadium, Nassau
Attendance: 330
Referee: Valman Bedeau (Grenada)

Bahamas won 5–2 on aggregate and advanced to the second round.

=== Second round ===
April 1, 2000

Haiti	9–0	Bahamas
Michel 3', 16', 57'; Menelas 8', 33', 68'; Pierre 29', 37'; Edouard 72'	Report

Stade Sylvio Cator, Port-au-Prince
Attendance: 18,000
Referee: Nery Alfaro (El Salvador)
April 16, 2000

Bahamas	0–4	Haiti
	Report	Edouard 15', 50'; Pierre 68', 76'

Thomas Robinson Stadium, Nassau
Attendance: 6,000
Referee: Mark Forde (Barbados)

Haiti won 13–0 on aggregate and advanced to the third round.

April 2, 2000

Trinidad and Tobago	3–0	Dominican Republic
Dwarika 67' (pen.), 90' (pen.); Eve 79'	Report

Queen's Park Oval, Port of Spain
Attendance: 6,180
Referee: Stuart Crockwell (Bermuda)
April 16, 2000

Dominican Republic	0–1	Trinidad and Tobago
	Report	Pierre 72'

Estadio San Cristóbal, San Cristóbal
Attendance: 1,000
Referee: Kevin Stott (United States)

Trinidad and Tobago won 4–0 on aggregate and advanced to the third round.

=== Third round ===
May 7, 2000

Trinidad and Tobago	3–1	Haiti
Andrews 34'; Dwarika 75'; Yorke 76'	Report	Pierre 90'

Hasley Crawford Stadium, Port of Spain
Attendance: 25,000
Referee: Peter Prendergast (Jamaica)
May 19, 2000

Haiti	1–1	Trinidad and Tobago
Thelamour 83'	Report	Yorke 26'

Stade Sylvio Cator, Port-au-Prince
Attendance: 15,000
Referee: Gilberto Alcala (Mexico)

Trinidad and Tobago won 4–2 on aggregate and advanced to the semi-finals. Haiti advanced to the play-offs.

== Goalscorers ==
There were 147 goals scored in 40 matches, for an average of 3.67 goals per match.

10 goals

- (Haiti national football team) Golman Pierre

6 goals

- (Barbados national football team) Jerry Alexander
- (Saint Vincent and the Grenadines national football team) James Chewitt

5 goals

- (Saint Vincent and the Grenadines national football team) Alwyn Guy
- (Trinidad and Tobago national football team) Arnold Dwarika

4 goals

- (Barbados national football team) Llewellyn Riley
- (Haiti national football team) Jean-Robert Menelas
- (Saint Vincent and the Grenadines national football team) Rodney Jack

3 goals

- (Antigua and Barbuda national football team) Gregory Grayson
- (Aruba national football team) Santana Vander Kross
- (Bermuda national football team) Shaun Goater
- (Haiti national football team) Vladimir Edouard
- (Haiti national football team) Gabriel Michel
- (Saint Kitts and Nevis national football team) Keith Gumbs
- (Saint Kitts and Nevis national football team) Alexis Saddler
- (Trinidad and Tobago national football team) Marvin Andrews
- (Trinidad and Tobago national football team) Angus Eve

2 goals

- (Aruba national football team) Theodore Filomina
- (Bahamas national football team) Kevin Davies
- (Bahamas national football team) Anton Haven
- (Bermuda national football team) Stephen Astwood
- (Bermuda national football team) John Barry Nusum
- (Bermuda national football team) Shannon Burgess
- (Cuba national football team) Lester More
- (Dominican Republic national football team) Luis Omar Zapata
- (Grenada national football team) Anthony Modeste
- (Puerto Rico national football team) Raphel Ortiz
- (Saint Kitts and Nevis national football team) Leroy Francis
- (Saint Kitts and Nevis national football team) Austin Huggins
- (Saint Kitts and Nevis national football team) George Isaac
- (Saint Kitts and Nevis national football team) Gary Smith
- (Saint Vincent and the Grenadines national football team) Kenlyn Gonsalves
- (Trinidad and Tobago national football team) Dwight Yorke

1 goal

- (Anguilla national football team) Kenneth Hughes
- (Anguilla national football team) Richard O'Connor
- (Aruba national football team) Mark Mackay
- (Aruba national football team) Oswalding Mackay
- (Bahamas national football team) George Moussis
- (Barbados national football team) Kirk Cox
- (Barbados national football team) Norman Forde
- (Barbados national football team) Gregory Goodridge
- (Bermuda national football team) Devarr Boyles
- (Bermuda national football team) Paul Cann
- (Bermuda national football team) Stanton Lewis
- (Bermuda national football team) Kyle Lightbourne
- (Bermuda national football team) Tokia Russell
- (Bermuda national football team) Meshach Wade
- (British Virgin Islands national football team) Avondale Williams
- (Cuba national football team) Ariel Álvarez
- (Cuba national football team) Miguel Gandara
- (Cuba national football team) Osmin Hernández
- (Cuba national football team) Luis Marten
- (Cuba national football team) Serguei Prado
- (Dominica national football team) Kelvyn Peters
- (Dominican Republic national football team) Vladimir Gregorio
- (Dominican Republic national football team) Miguel Pérez
- (Dominican Republic national football team) Carlos Reyes
- (Dominican Republic national football team) Luis Omar Sanchez
- (Grenada national football team) Franklyn Baptiste
- (Haiti national football team) Roosevelt Desir
- (Haiti national football team) Dieuphane Thelamour
- (Montserrat national football team) Wayne Dyer
- (Netherlands Antilles national football team) Angelo Martina
- (Puerto Rico national football team) Carlos Astondoa
- (Saint Kitts and Nevis national football team) Michael Crawford
- (Saint Lucia national football team) Renne Regis
- (Saint Vincent and the Grenadines national football team) Wesley Charles
- (Saint Vincent and the Grenadines national football team) Marlon James
- (Saint Vincent and the Grenadines national football team) Vincent John
- (Saint Vincent and the Grenadines national football team) Kendall Velox
- (Suriname national football team) Alberto Doesburg
- (Trinidad and Tobago national football team) Nigel Pierre
- (United States Virgin Islands national soccer team) Joaquim Santos

1 own goal

- (Antigua and Barbuda national football team) Phillip Skeal (against Saint Vincent and the Grenadines)
- (Aruba national football team) Carlos Geerman (against Puerto Rico)
- (Barbados national football team) Kirk Babb (against Greneda)
- (Cuba national football team) Alexander Cruzata (against Barbados)
