= 2006 FIFA World Cup qualification – CONCACAF first round =

In the first round of CONCACAF, the 20 lowest-ranked teams played home-and-away matches to determine the 10 teams who would progress to the second round of competition.

== Summary ==
Team 1	Agg.	Team 2	1st leg	2nd leg
Grenada	8–1	Guyana	5–0	3–1
Bermuda	20–0	Montserrat	13–0	7–0
Haiti	7–0	Turks and Caicos Islands	5–0	2–0
British Virgin Islands	0–10	Saint Lucia	0–1	0–9
Cayman Islands	1–5	Cuba	1–2	0–3
Aruba	2–10	Suriname	1–2	1–8
Antigua and Barbuda	2–3	Netherlands Antilles	2–0	0–3
Dominica	4–2	Bahamas	1–1	3–1
U.S. Virgin Islands	0–11	Saint Kitts and Nevis	0–4	0–7
Dominican Republic	6–0	Anguilla	0–0	6–0

== Matches ==
28 February 2004

Grenada	5–0	Guyana
Bishop 34'; Phillip 39'; Augustine 72'; Modeste 81'; Rennie 90+1'	Report

Grenada National Stadium
St. George's, Grenada
Attendance: 7,000
Referee: Benito Archundia (Mexico)
14 March 2004

Guyana	1–3	Grenada
Harris 29'	Report	Charles 15'; Roberts 69'; Bubb 87'

Blairmont Community Centre
Blairmont, Guyana
Attendance: 1,200
Referee: Wálter Quesada (Costa Rica)

Grenada won 8–1 on aggregate and advanced to the second round.

29 February 2004

Bermuda	13–0	Montserrat
Ming 5', 20', 50'; Nusum 15', 54', 60'; Smith 36'; Bean 41', 52'; Steede 43'; Wade 77'; Simons 83'; Burgess 87'	Report

Bermuda National Stadium
Hamilton, Bermuda
Attendance: 3,000
Referee: Michael Kennedy (United States)
21 March 2004

Montserrat	0–7	Bermuda
	Report	Hill 15'; Nusum 21', 44'; Bean 29'; Smith 45', 46'; Ming 76'

Blakes Estate Stadium
Lookout, Montserrat
Attendance: 250
Referee: Martin Charles (Dominica)

Bermuda won 20–0 on aggregate and advanced to the second round.

18 February 2004

Haiti	5–0	Turks and Caicos Islands
Peguero 6'; Descouines 43', 45', 50'; Wadson 71'	Report

Orange Bowl
Miami, United States
Attendance: 3,000
Referee: Kevin Stott (United States)
21 February 2004

Turks and Caicos Islands	0–2	Haiti
	Report	Lormera 10' (pen.); Harvey 41' (o.g.)

Ted Hendricks Stadium
Hialeah, United States
Attendance: 3,000
Referee: Ricardo Valenzuela (United States)

Haiti won 7–0 on aggregate and advanced to the second round.

22 February 2004

British Virgin Islands	0–1	Saint Lucia
	Report	Elva 55'

Sherly Ground
Road Town, British Virgin Islands
Attendance: 800
Referee: Victor Stewart (Jamaica)
28 March 2004

Saint Lucia	9–0	British Virgin Islands
Emmanuel 13' (pen.), 66'; Joseph 26'; Jean 28', 52'; Skeete 49', 55'; Elva 69'; Baptiste 90'	Report

Vieux Fort National Stadium
Vieux Fort, Saint Lucia
Attendance: 665
Referee: Jean-François Corrivault (Canada)

St. Lucia won 10–0 on aggregate and advanced to the second round.

22 February 2004

Cayman Islands	1–2	Cuba
Elliot 72'	Report	Moré 53'; Marten 89'

Truman Bodden Stadium
George Town, Cayman Islands
Attendance: 1,789
Referee: Rodolfo Sibrian (El Salvador)
27 March 2004

Cuba	3–0	Cayman Islands
Moré 7', 50', 66'	Report

Estadio Pedro Marrero
Havana, Cuba
Attendance: 3,500
Referee: Marco Rodriguez (Mexico)

Cuba won 5–1 on aggregate and advanced to the second round.

28 February 2004

Aruba	1–2	Suriname
Escalona 89'	Report	Felter 54' (pen.); Zinhagel 63'

Guillermo Prospero Trinidad Stadium
Oranjestad, Aruba
Attendance: 2,108
Referee: Roberto Moreno (Panama)
27 March 2004

Suriname	8–1	Aruba
Kinsaini 6', 49'; Loswijk 14'; Felter 18', 65', 66'; Sandvliet 42'; Zinhagel 90'	Report	Escalona 24'

André Kamperveen Stadion
Paramaribo, Suriname
Attendance: 4,000
Referee: Peter Prendergast (Jamaica)

Suriname won 10–2 on aggregate and advanced to the second round.

18 February 2004

Antigua and Barbuda	2–0	Netherlands Antilles
Roberts 39'; Clarke 89'	Report

Antigua Recreation Ground
St. John's, Antigua and Barbuda
Attendance: 1,500
Referee: Mauricio Navarro (Canada)
31 March 2004

Netherlands Antilles	3–0	Antigua and Barbuda
Siberie 27'; Martha 46'; Hosé 48'	Report

Stadion Ergilio Hato
Willemstad, Netherlands Antilles
Attendance: 9,000
Referee: Richard Piper (Trinidad & Tobago)

Netherlands Antilles won 3–2 on aggregate and advanced to the second round.

26 March 2004

Dominica	1–1	Bahamas
Casimir 88'	Report	Horton 66'

Thomas Robinson Stadium
Nassau, The Bahamas
Attendance: 800
Referee: Mark Forde (Barbados)
28 March 2004

Bahamas	1–3	Dominica
Jean 67'	Report	Casimir 39', 86'; Peters 85'

Thomas Robinson Stadium
Nassau, The Bahamas
Attendance: 900
Referee: Jose Pineda (Honduras)

Dominica won 4–2 on aggregate and advanced to the second round.

18 February 2004

U.S. Virgin Islands	0–4	Saint Kitts and Nevis
	Report	Higgins 26'; Lake 50', 64'; Isaac 62'

Lionel Roberts Park
Charlotte Amalie, United States Virgin Islands
Attendance: 225
Referee: Neal Brizan (Trinidad & Tobago)
31 March 2004

Saint Kitts and Nevis	7–0	U.S. Virgin Islands
Lake 8', 38', 46', 56', 77'; Isaac 80', 90'	Report

Warner Park
Basseterre, Saint Kitts and Nevis
Attendance: 800
Referee: Neftali Recinos (El Salvador)

Saint Kitts and Nevis won 11–0 on aggregate and advanced to the second round.

19 March 2004

Dominican Republic	0–0	Anguilla
	Report

Estadio Olímpico Juan Pablo Duarte
Santo Domingo, Dominican Republic
Attendance: 400
Referee: William Mattus (Costa Rica)
21 March 2004

Anguilla	0–6	Dominican Republic
	Report	Zapata 15'; Severino 38', 61' (pen.); Contrera 57', 90'; Casquez 77'

Estadio Olímpico Juan Pablo Duarte
Santo Domingo, Dominican Republic
Attendance: 850
Referee: Greivin Porras (Costa Rica)

Dominican Republic won 6–0 on aggregate and advanced to the second round.

== Goalscorers ==
There were 92 goals scored in 20 matches, for an average of 4.6 goals per match.

7 goals

- (Saint Kitts and Nevis) Ian Lake

5 goals

- (Bermuda) John Barry Nusum

4 goals

- (Bermuda) Damon Ming
- (Cuba) Lester Moré
- (Suriname) Marlon Felter

3 goals

- (Bermuda) Ralph Bean
- (Bermuda) Khano Smith
- (Dominica) Vincent Casimir
- (Haiti) Johnny Descouines
- (Saint Kitts and Nevis) George Isaac

2 goals

- (Aruba) Maurice Escalona
- (Dominican Republic) Juan Contrera
- (Dominican Republic) Kervin Severino
- (Saint Lucia) Titus Elva
- (Saint Lucia) Sheldon Emmanuel
- (Saint Lucia) Earl Jean
- (Saint Lucia) Jarvin Skeete
- (Suriname) Gordon Kinsaini
- (Suriname) Patrick Zinhagel

1 goal

- (Antigua and Barbuda) Quentin Clarke
- (Antigua and Barbuda) Winston Roberts
- (The Bahamas) Damani Horton
- (The Bahamas) Nesley Jean
- (Bermuda) Shannon Burgess
- (Bermuda) Clevon Hill
- (Bermuda) Rohann Simons
- (Bermuda) Otis Steede
- (Bermuda) Meshach Wade
- (Cayman Islands) Thomas Elliot
- (Cuba) Luis Marten
- (Dominica) Kelly Peters
- (Dominican Republic) Luis Casquez
- (Dominican Republic) Omar Zapata
- (Grenada) Anthony Augustine
- (Grenada) Nigel Bishop
- (Grenada) Byron Bubb
- (Grenada) Ricky Charles
- (Grenada) Anthony Modeste
- (Grenada) Kennedy Phillip
- (Grenada) Dennis Rennie
- (Grenada) Jason Roberts
- (Guyana) Carey Harris
- (Haiti) Roody Lormera
- (Haiti) Jean-Philippe Peguero
- (Haiti) Corriolan Wadson
- (Netherlands Antilles) Brutil Hosé
- (Netherlands Antilles) Eugene Martha
- (Netherlands Antilles) Rocky Siberie
- (Saint Kitts and Nevis) Austin Huggins
- (Saint Lucia) Andy Baptiste
- (Saint Lucia) Elijah Joseph
- (Suriname) Carlos Loswijk
- (Suriname) Clifton Sandvliet

1 own goal

- (Turks and Caicos Islands) Lawrence Harvey (against Haiti)
