= 2005 Caribbean Cup =

Digicel Caribbean Cup 2005

Tournament details
- Host country: Barbados
- Teams: 30 (from 1 confederation)

Final positions
- Champions: Jamaica (3rd title)
- Runners-up: Cuba
- Third place: Trinidad and Tobago
- Fourth place: Barbados

Tournament statistics
- Matches played: 52
- Goals scored: 175 (3.37 per match)
- Top scorer(s): (Jamaica) Luton Shelton (9 goals)

The 2005 Caribbean Cup (known as the Digicel Caribbean Cup for sponsorship reasons) was the thirteenth edition of the Caribbean Cup hosted by Barbados and won by Jamaica. In all, 30 countries were invited, of which, 22 participated and 8 withdrew.

== Qualifying tournament ==
=== First qualifying round (group stage) ===
==== Group A ====
Group A Qualifier: Saint-Martin w/o Sint Maarten (Sint Maarten withdrew)

Played in Kingston, Jamaica

Team	Pld	W	D	L	GF	GA	GD	Pts
Jamaica	3	3	0	0	26	2	+24	9
Haiti	3	2	0	1	14	3	+11	6
Saint-Martin	3	0	1	2	0	14	−14	1
U.S. Virgin Islands	3	0	1	2	1	22	−21	1

24 November 2004

Jamaica	12–0	Saint-Martin
Dean 2', 11', 30'; Hue 10'; Shelton 17', 39', 45', 52'; Stephenson 18'; Scarlett 20', 85'; West 54'

Jamaica
24 November 2004

Haiti	11–0	U.S. Virgin Islands
Mesidor 13', 30', 48'; Ulcena 15', 78'; Saint-Preux 33'; Chéry 40', 90+1'; Lormera 57'; Germain 64'; Thelamour 87'

Jamaica

26 November 2004

Jamaica	11–1	U.S. Virgin Islands
Shelton 9'; Dean 23', 32'; Hue 36', 53', 56'; Stephenson 40'; Williams 50'; Davis 64'; Bennett 67'; Priestley 68'		Lauro 72'

Jamaica
26 November 2004

Haiti	2–0	Saint-Martin
Bruny 25'; Thelamour 67'

Jamaica

28 November 2004

Jamaica	3–1	Haiti
Stephenson 20'; Dean 22'; Shelton 32'		Ulcena 41'

Jamaica
28 November 2004

U.S. Virgin Islands	0–0	Saint-Martin

Jamaica

==== Group B ====
Played in Martinique

Team	Pld	W	D	L	GF	GA	GD	Pts
French Guiana	3	2	1	0	5	0	+5	7
Martinique	3	1	2	0	5	1	+4	5
Guadeloupe	3	1	1	1	7	1	+6	4
Dominica	3	0	0	3	1	16	−15	0

10 November 2004

Dominica	1–5	Martinique
Peltier 39'		Bullet 28', 44'; Goron 43'; Percin 58'; Thalien 87'

Martinique
10 November 2004

Guadeloupe	0–1	French Guiana
		Cosset 52'

Martinique

November 12, 2004

Dominica	0–7	Guadeloupe
		Percin 13', 39'; Mocka 23', 26', 35'; Laurent 47'; Cassubie 76'

Martinique
12 November 2004

Martinique	0–0	French Guiana

Martinique

14 November 2004

Dominica	0–4	French Guiana
		Boecasse 4'; Martinon 70'; Breleur 78', 85'

Martinique
14 November 2004

Guadeloupe	0–0	Martinique

Martinique

==== Group C ====
Group C qualifier: Turks and Caicos Islands withdrew.

Bahamas qualified but they also withdrew; their place was taken by Guyana. The participants were supposed to be: Cuba, Netherlands Antilles, Guyana, Dominican Republic, and the matches were planned to be played in Cuba. However, Netherlands Antilles, Guyana, Dominican Republic all withdrew later, and so Cuba won the group automatically.

==== Group D ====
Group D qualifier: Guyana both through Suriname. The matches were scheduled to be played on 5 and 11 September but Guyana were requested to replace the Bahamas from Group C who withdrew so Suriname was drawn into Group D.

Played in Trinidad and Tobago

Team	Pld	W	D	L	GF	GA	GD	Pts
Trinidad and Tobago	3	3	0	0	8	0	+8	9
Grenada	3	1	1	1	7	6	+1	4
Suriname	3	0	2	1	3	4	−1	2
Puerto Rico	3	0	1	2	3	11	−8	1

24 November 2004

Trinidad and Tobago	5–0	Puerto Rico
Glen 13', 43', 48'; King 81' (pen.); Smith 89'

Trinidad and Tobago
24 November 2004

Grenada	2–2	Suriname
Charles 46'; Bishop 50'		Modeste 27' (o.g.); Sandvliet 59'

Trinidad and Tobago

26 November 2004

Trinidad and Tobago	2–0	Grenada
Pierre 22'; Gray 49'

Trinidad and Tobago
November 26, 2004

Suriname	1–1	Puerto Rico
Sandvliet 45'		Ortiz 79'

Trinidad and Tobago

28 November 2004

Trinidad and Tobago	1–0	Suriname
Glen 65'

Trinidad and Tobago
28 November 2004

Grenada	5–2	Puerto Rico
Vélez 1' (o.g.); Charles 3'; Rennie 58'; Williams 68'; Langaigne 75'		García 85'; Nieves 86'

Trinidad and Tobago

==== Group E ====
Group E qualifier: Bermuda w/o Aruba (Aruba withdrew)

Played in Saint Vincent; originally planned for Cayman Islands, but rescheduled due to hurricane damage

Team	Pld	W	D	L	GF	GA	GD	Pts
Saint Vincent and the Grenadines	3	1	2	0	8	4	+4	5
British Virgin Islands	3	1	1	1	3	2	+1	4
Bermuda	3	1	1	1	5	6	−1	4
Cayman Islands	3	1	0	2	2	6	−4	3

24 November 2004

Saint Vincent and the Grenadines	1–1	British Virgin Islands
Forde 69'		Haynes 53'

Saint Vincent and the Grenadines
24 November 2004

Bermuda	2–1	Cayman Islands
Smith 4'; Hill 34'		Berry 48'

Saint Vincent and the Grenadines

26 November 2004

Saint Vincent and the Grenadines	3–3	Bermuda
Pierre 7'; Haynes 52'; Samuel 54'		Smith 45'; Lowe 79'; Ming 89'

Saint Vincent and the Grenadines
26 November 2004

British Virgin Islands	0–1	Cayman Islands
		Whittaker 49'

Saint Vincent and the Grenadines

28 November 2004

Saint Vincent and the Grenadines	4–0	Cayman Islands
Samuel 20', 51'; Forde 43' (pen.); Gonsalves 80'

Saint Vincent and the Grenadines
28 November 2004

British Virgin Islands	2–0	Bermuda
James 12', 24'

Saint Vincent and the Grenadines

NB: Bermuda have protested the eligibility of three BVI players (Montgomery Butler, Avondale Williams, Venton James) as being Saint Vincentians.

==== Group F ====
Group F qualifier: Antigua and Barbuda w/o Anguilla (Anguilla withdrew)

Played in Saint Kitts and Nevis

Team	Pld	W	D	L	GF	GA	GD	Pts
Saint Kitts and Nevis	3	2	1	0	9	2	+7	7
Saint Lucia	3	2	1	0	6	2	+4	7
Antigua and Barbuda	3	1	0	2	6	8	−2	3
Montserrat	3	0	0	3	5	14	−9	0

31 October 2004

Saint Kitts and Nevis	6–1	Montserrat
Francis 10', 45', 86'; Cannonier 36'; Isaac 57'; Hodge 83'		Adams 81'

Saint Kitts and Nevis

2 November 2004

Antigua and Barbuda	5–4	Montserrat
Hawson 30' (o.g.); Frederick 53'; Gonsalves 67', 82'; Thomas 72'		Bramble 38'; Fox 41'; Mendes 50'; Farrell 61'

Saint Kitts and Nevis
2 November 2004

Saint Kitts and Nevis	1–1	Saint Lucia
Francis 14'		Gilbert 67'

Saint Kitts and Nevis

4 November 2004

Saint Lucia	3–0	Montserrat

Saint Kitts and Nevis
4 November 2004

Saint Kitts and Nevis	2–0	Antigua and Barbuda
Sargeant 34'; Isaac 45'

Saint Kitts and Nevis

6 November 2004

Saint Lucia	2–1	Antigua and Barbuda
Elva 22'; Gilbert 27'		Dublin 65'

Saint Kitts and Nevis

=== Second qualifying round ===
12 December 2004

Haiti	1–0	Saint Kitts and Nevis
Cadet 62'

Lockhart Stadium
15 December 2004

Saint Kitts and Nevis	0–2	Haiti
		Cadet 17'; Dorcelus 70'

Saint Kitts and Nevis

12 December 2004

Saint Lucia	1–1	Jamaica
Joseph 23'		Priestley 44'

Saint Lucia
19 December 2004

Jamaica	2–1	Saint Lucia
Dean 1'; Hue 67'		Elva 23'

Jamaica

12 December 2004

British Virgin Islands	0–4	Trinidad and Tobago
		Pierre 7', 65'; Jemmott 69'; Spann 70'

British Virgin Islands
19 December 2004

Trinidad and Tobago	2–0	British Virgin Islands
Pierre 22'; Eve 62'

Marvin Lee Stadium

12 December 2004

Saint Vincent and the Grenadines	3–1	Grenada
Samuel 10'; Guy 22'; Velox 60'		Rennie 56'

Saint Vincent and the Grenadines
19 December 2004

Grenada	0–1	Saint Vincent and the Grenadines
		Francis 6'

Grenada

12 December 2004

Cuba	2–0	Martinique
Faife 30'; Galindo 87'

Cuba
21 December 2004

Martinique	0–2	Cuba
		Cervantes 9'; More 62'

Martinique

- French Guiana bye

=== Third qualifying round ===
8 January 2005

Jamaica	5–0	French Guiana
Hue 13'; Stewart 57'; Shelton 62'; Scarlett 75'; Bennett 83'

Jamaica
15 January 2005

French Guiana	0–0	Jamaica

French Guiana

9 January 2005

Trinidad and Tobago	3–1	Saint Vincent and the Grenadines
Glasgow 51'; Fitzpatrick 54', 62'		Haynes 24'

Trinidad and Tobago
16 January 2005

Saint Vincent and the Grenadines	1–0	Trinidad and Tobago
Forde 65' (pen.)

Saint Vincent and the Grenadines

9 January 2005

Haiti	0–1	Cuba
		Galindo 51'

Haiti
16 January 2005

Cuba	1–1 (a.e.t)	Haiti
Márquez 112'		Cadet 59'

Cuba

== Final round ==
NB: Barbados qualified as hosts

Team	Pld	W	D	L	GF	GA	GD	Pts
Jamaica	3	3	0	0	4	1	+3	9
Cuba	3	2	0	1	5	2	+3	6
Trinidad and Tobago	3	1	0	2	5	6	−1	3
Barbados	3	0	0	3	2	7	−5	0

20 February 2005

Jamaica	2–1	Trinidad and Tobago
Shelton 13'; Williams 35'		Pierre 37'

Barbados National Stadium
Saint Michael, Barbados
20 February 2005

Barbados	0–3	Cuba
		More 24' 71'; Galindo 90'

Barbados National Stadium
Saint Michael, Barbados

22 February 2005

Cuba	2–1	Trinidad and Tobago
More 23', 47'		Cornell Glen 13'

Barbados National Stadium
Saint Michael, Barbados
22 February 2005

Jamaica	1–0	Barbados
Williams 8'

Barbados National Stadium
Saint Michael, Barbados

24 February 2005

Cuba	0–1	Jamaica
		Shelton 48'

Barbados National Stadium
Saint Michael, Barbados
24 February 2005

Trinidad and Tobago	3–2	Barbados
Smith 11'; Glen 30'; Eve 84'		Forde 32'; Lucas 86'

Barbados National Stadium
Saint Michael, Barbados

Jamaica, Cuba and Trinidad and Tobago qualified for CONCACAF Gold Cup 2005

2005 Caribbean Cup winner

Jamaica
Third title

== Top scorers ==
Name		Goals
1	(Jamaica) Luton Shelton	9
2	(Jamaica) Roland Dean	7
3	(Jamaica) Jermaine Hue	6
3	(Trinidad and Tobago) Nigel Pierre	6
3	(Trinidad and Tobago) Cornell Glen	6
6	(Cuba) Lester More	5
7	(Saint Kitts and Nevis) Jevon Francis	4
7	(Saint Vincent and the Grenadines) Shandel Samuel	4
