= 2003 CONCACAF Gold Cup qualification =

== CFU qualifying tournament ==
=== Preliminary round ===
6 July 2002

| Grenada | 8–3 | Saint-Martin |
|---|---|---|
| Phillip 10'; Ettiene 25'; Rennie 56', 61', 75', 80', 90+'; Charles 71' | | Lynch 4'; Pindi 45'; Samer 90+' |

Grenada National Stadium, St. George's
4 August 2002

| Saint-Martin | 1–7 | Grenada |
|---|---|---|
| Francois 88' | | K. Bain 13'; Phillip 23'; K. Baptiste 54' (pen.); Bishop 64'; Charles 67', 72', 85' |

Stade Alberic Richards, Sandy Ground

7 July 2002

| Guadeloupe | 4–0 | Puerto Rico |
|---|---|---|
| Cassubie 46'; Nieves 55' (o.g.); Benon 56'; T. Mocka 77' |

Stade Baie-Mahault, Baie-Mahault
21 July 2002

| Puerto Rico | 0–2 | Guadeloupe |
|---|---|---|
| | | Benon 26'; Radacal 84' |

Estadio Country Club, San Juan

14 July 2002

| British Virgin Islands | 1–3 | Saint Lucia |
|---|---|---|
| Huggins 53' | | V. Joseph 15'; McVane 40'; Emerson 60' |

A.O. Shirley Recreation Ground, Road Town
28 July 2002

| Saint Lucia | 8–1 | British Virgin Islands |
|---|---|---|
| Benner 2'; V. Joseph 7'; McVane 43'; Emerson 52', 75'; Mark 54'; E. Joseph 58'; Elva 82' | | Azile 36' |

George Odlum Stadium, Vieux Fort

14 July 2002

| Montserrat | w / o | Dominica |

Montserrat
28 July 2002

| Dominica | w / o | Montserrat |

Dominica

28 July 2002

| Guyana | 2–1 | Netherlands Antilles |
|---|---|---|
| Cole 6'; Forbes 56' | | Muzo 14' |

Bourda, Georgetown
11 August 2002

| Netherlands Antilles | 1–0 (3–2 pen.) | Guyana |
|---|---|---|
| Martis 43' |

Ergilio Hato Stadium, Willemstad

28 July 2002

| Aruba | 0–2 | Suriname |
|---|---|---|
| | | Kejansi 55'; Sandvliet 62' |

Trinidad Stadium, Oranjestad
11 August 2002

| Suriname | 6–0 | Aruba |
|---|---|---|
| Zinhagel 28', 47'; Kejansi 35', 57', 84'; Kinsaini 63' |

André Kamperveen Stadion, Paramaribo

16 August 2002

| U.S. Virgin Islands | 1–6 | Dominican Republic |
|---|---|---|
| Sheppard 44' | | Zapata 16'; Contreras 28'; Almanzar 33'; Mejía 38', 67'; Odalis 62' |

Santo Domingo
18 August 2002

| Dominican Republic | 5–1 | U.S. Virgin Islands |
|---|---|---|
| López 12'; Zapata 14'; Sánchez 43'; Valenzuela 55'; Mejía 88' | | Sheppard 69' |

Santo Domingo

=== First round ===
==== Group A ====
| Team | Pld | W | D | L | GF | GA | GD | Pts |
|---|---|---|---|---|---|---|---|---|
| Trinidad and Tobago | 2 | 1 | 0 | 1 | 2 | 1 | +1 | 3 |
| Saint Lucia | 2 | 1 | 0 | 1 | 2 | 2 | 0 | 3 |
| Saint Kitts and Nevis | 2 | 1 | 0 | 1 | 2 | 3 | −1 | 3 |

13 November 2002

| Saint Lucia | 1–2 | Saint Kitts and Nevis |
|---|---|---|
| Lastic 77' | | Isaac 38', 56' |

Marvin Lee Stadium, Macoya

15 November 2002

| Saint Kitts and Nevis | 0–2 | Trinidad and Tobago |
|---|---|---|
| | | Glasgow 39'; Noray 60' |

Hasely Crawford Stadium, Port of Spain

17 November 2002

| Trinidad and Tobago | 0–1 | Saint Lucia |
|---|---|---|
| | | McVane 54' |

Marvin Lee Stadium, Macoya

==== Group B ====
| Team | Pld | W | D | L | GF | GA | GD | Pts |
|---|---|---|---|---|---|---|---|---|
| Cuba | 3 | 3 | 0 | 0 | 9 | 2 | +7 | 9 |
| Martinique | 3 | 2 | 0 | 1 | 8 | 2 | +6 | 6 |
| Cayman Islands | 3 | 1 | 0 | 2 | 1 | 8 | −7 | 3 |
| Dominican Republic | 3 | 0 | 0 | 3 | 1 | 7 | −6 | 0 |

27 November 2002

| Dominican Republic | 0–4 | Martinique |
|---|---|---|
| | | Rano 70', 72'; Duragrin 83'; J. Goron 89' |

Truman Bodden Sports Complex, George Town
27 November 2002

| Cayman Islands | 0–5 | Cuba |
|---|---|---|
| | | Driggs 21'; Moré 23', 77'; Darcourt 83'; Galindo 86' |

Truman Bodden Sports Complex, George Town

29 November 2002

| Dominican Republic | 0–1 | Cayman Islands |
|---|---|---|
| | | Forbes 27' |

Truman Bodden Sports Complex, George Town
29 November 2002

| Cuba | 2–1 | Martinique |
|---|---|---|
| Moré 38'; Darcourt 60' | | Lavril 43' |

Truman Bodden Sports Complex, George Town

1 December 2002

| Cuba | 2–1 | Dominican Republic |
|---|---|---|
| López 63' (o.g.); Prado 67' | | Mariano 20' |

Truman Bodden Sports Complex, George Town
1 December 2002

| Cayman Islands | 0–3 | Martinique |
|---|---|---|
| | | J. Goron 53'; Percin 61', 86' |

Truman Bodden Sports Complex, George Town

==== Group C ====
| Team | Pld | W | D | L | GF | GA | GD | Pts |
|---|---|---|---|---|---|---|---|---|
| Jamaica | 3 | 2 | 1 | 0 | 7 | 2 | +5 | 7 |
| Guadeloupe | 3 | 2 | 0 | 1 | 6 | 6 | 0 | 6 |
| Barbados | 3 | 1 | 1 | 1 | 3 | 2 | +1 | 4 |
| Grenada | 3 | 0 | 0 | 3 | 5 | 11 | −6 | 0 |

9 November 2002

| Barbados | 1–1 | Jamaica |
|---|---|---|
| Goodridge 87' | | Hall 90' |

Grenada National Stadium, St. George's
9 November 2002

| Grenada | 4–5 | Guadeloupe |
|---|---|---|
| C. Bain 14'; K. Bain 45'; Modeste 47'; Williams 47' | | Cassubie 30', 43', 68'; É. Mocka 35'; Lambourde 54' |

Grenada National Stadium, St. George's

11 November 2002

| Grenada | 0–2 | Barbados |
|---|---|---|
| | | Lucas 66'; Goodridge 90' |

Grenada National Stadium, St. George's
11 November 2002

| Jamaica | 2–0 | Guadeloupe |
|---|---|---|
| Johnson 56'; Hall 59' |

Grenada National Stadium, St. George's

13 November 2002

| Barbados | 0–1 | Guadeloupe |
|---|---|---|
| | | Vertot 83' (pen.) |

Grenada National Stadium, St. George's
13 November 2002

| Grenada | 1–4 | Jamaica |
|---|---|---|
| Ettienne 75' | | Johnson 8', 40'; Hall 57', 90' |

Grenada National Stadium, St. George's

==== Group D ====
| Team | Pld | W | D | L | GF | GA | GD | Pts |
|---|---|---|---|---|---|---|---|---|
| Haiti | 2 | 2 | 0 | 0 | 4 | 0 | +4 | 6 |
| Antigua and Barbuda | 2 | 0 | 1 | 1 | 1 | 2 | −1 | 1 |
| Netherlands Antilles | 2 | 0 | 1 | 1 | 1 | 4 | −3 | 1 |
| Suriname | 0 | 0 | 0 | 0 | 0 | 0 | 0 | 0 |

18 November 2002

| Haiti | 1–0 | Antigua and Barbuda |
|---|---|---|
| Lormera 48' |

Stade Sylvio Cator, Port-au-Prince

20 November 2002

| Antigua and Barbuda | 1–1 | Netherlands Antilles |
|---|---|---|
| Jeffers 77' | | Forbius 88' |

Stade Sylvio Cator, Port-au-Prince

22 November 2002

| Haiti | 3–0 | Netherlands Antilles |
|---|---|---|
| Lormera 5'; Gilles 45'; Menelas 75' |

Stade Sylvio Cator, Port-au-Prince

=== Final round ===
==== Group A ====
| Team | Pld | W | D | L | GF | GA | GD | Pts |
|---|---|---|---|---|---|---|---|---|
| Jamaica | 3 | 2 | 1 | 0 | 10 | 2 | +8 | 7 |
| Martinique | 3 | 1 | 1 | 1 | 8 | 8 | 0 | 4 |
| Haiti | 3 | 1 | 0 | 2 | 3 | 6 | −3 | 3 |
| Saint Lucia | 3 | 1 | 0 | 2 | 6 | 11 | −5 | 3 |

26 March 2003

| Haiti | 2–1 | Martinique |
|---|---|---|
| Menelas 22', 65' | | Percin 5' |

Independence Park, Kingston
26 March 2003

| Jamaica | 5–0 | Saint Lucia |
|---|---|---|
| Williams 9'; Taylor 11'; Chin-Sue 37'; Davis 56'; Daley 62' |

Independence Park, Kingston

28 March 2003

| Saint Lucia | 2–1 | Haiti |
|---|---|---|
| Emmanuel 45'; Flavius 90' | | Romulus 73' |

Independence Park, Kingston
28 March 2003

| Jamaica | 2–2 | Martinique |
|---|---|---|
| Daley 83'; Davis 90' | | Goron 25'; Duragrin 63' |

Independence Park, Kingston

30 March 2003

| Martinique | 5–4 | Saint Lucia |
|---|---|---|
| Goron 45'; Ginier-Dufournier 64', 84'; Reuperné 73'; Duragrin 89' | | Elva 21'; Mark 38'; Jean 52'; Joseph 56' |

Independence Park, Kingston
30 March 2003

| Jamaica | 3–0 | Haiti |
|---|---|---|
| Johnson 15'; Daley 58'; Pierre 66' (o.g.) |

Independence Park, Kingston

==== Group B ====
| Team | Pld | W | D | L | GF | GA | GD | Pts |
|---|---|---|---|---|---|---|---|---|
| Cuba | 3 | 3 | 0 | 0 | 8 | 3 | +5 | 9 |
| Trinidad and Tobago | 3 | 2 | 0 | 1 | 4 | 3 | +1 | 6 |
| Guadeloupe | 3 | 1 | 0 | 2 | 4 | 4 | 0 | 3 |
| Antigua and Barbuda | 3 | 0 | 0 | 3 | 0 | 6 | −6 | 0 |

26 March 2003

| Cuba | 3–2 | Guadeloupe |
|---|---|---|
| Galindo 17', 83'; Darcourt 30' | | Farnabé 44', 51' |

Hasley Crawford Stadium, Port of Spain
26 March 2003

| Trinidad and Tobago | 2–0 | Antigua and Barbuda |
|---|---|---|
| Wise 3'; John 55' |

Hasley Crawford Stadium, Port of Spain

28 March 2003

| Cuba | 2–0 | Antigua and Barbuda |
|---|---|---|
| Moré 65', 78' |

Marvin Lee Stadium, Macoya
28 March 2003

| Trinidad and Tobago | 1–0 | Guadeloupe |
|---|---|---|
| John 88' (pen.) |

Marvin Lee Stadium, Macoya

30 March 2003

| Guadeloupe | 2–0 | Antigua and Barbuda |
|---|---|---|
| D. Mocka 67', 77' |

Manny Ramjohn Stadium, Marabella
30 March 2003

| Trinidad and Tobago | 1–3 | Cuba |
|---|---|---|
| John 18' | | Ramírez 26'; Moré 72'; Galindo 77' |

Manny Ramjohn Stadium, Marabella

== UNCAF Qualification Tournament ==
The UNCAF Nations Cup acted as the Gold Cup qualifying tournament for the Central American teams. The teams qualifying were Costa Rica, Guatemala and El Salvador

== Qualifying round ==
| Team | Pld | W | D | L | GF | GA | GD | Pts |
|---|---|---|---|---|---|---|---|---|
| Honduras | 2 | 2 | 0 | 0 | 6 | 2 | +4 | 6 |
| Martinique | 2 | 1 | 0 | 1 | 5 | 6 | −1 | 3 |
| Trinidad and Tobago | 2 | 0 | 0 | 2 | 2 | 5 | −3 | 0 |

23 April 2003

| Martinique | 3–2 | Trinidad and Tobago |
|---|---|---|
| Goron 66'; Dufournier 68'; Reyal 83' | | Dwarika 13'; Scotland 41' |

Stade Pierre-Aliker, Fort-de-France

25 April 2003

| Trinidad and Tobago | 0–2 | Honduras |
|---|---|---|
| | Report | Velásquez 50'; Ramírez 89' |

Stade Pierre-Aliker, Fort-de-France
Referee: Marco Antonio Rodríguez (MEX)

27 April 2003

| Honduras | 4–2 | Martinique |
|---|---|---|
| Velásquez 31'; Ramírez 63'; Turcios 73'; Hernández 89' | Report | Goron 48'; Padoly 67' |

Stade Pierre-Aliker, Fort-de-France
Referee: Marco Antonio Rodríguez (MEX)
