= Angus Eve =

Trinidad and Tobago footballer (born 1972)

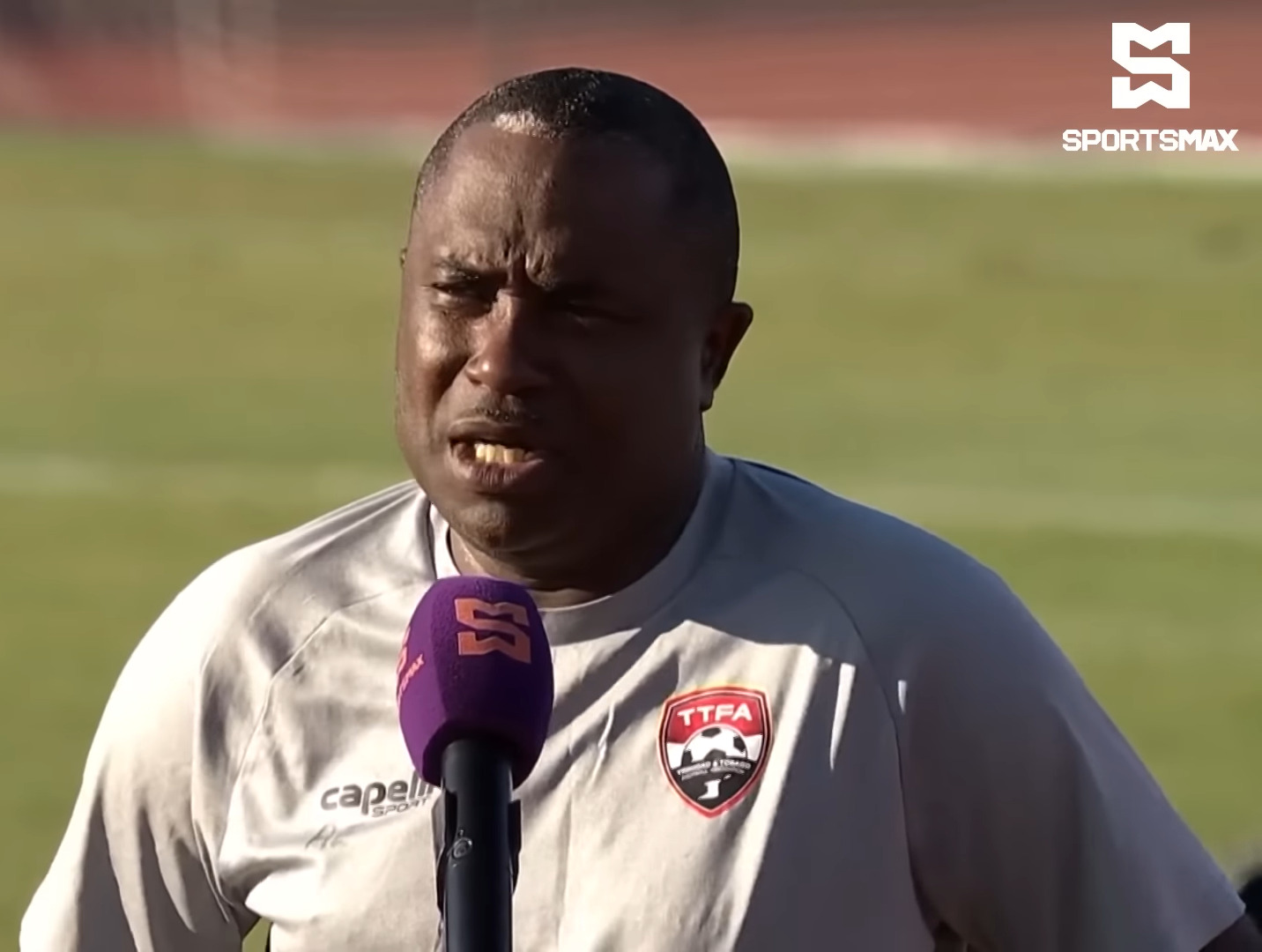
- Eve as head coach of Trinidad and Tobago men's national team in 2024

Personal information
- Date of birth: 23 February 1972 (age 54)
- Place of birth: Carenage, Trinidad and Tobago
- Height: 1.70 m (5 ft 7 in)
- Position: Midfielder

Senior career*
Years	Team	Apps	(Gls)
1993–1994	Joe Public		
1995–1996	Defence Force		
1997–1999	Joe Public		(22+)
1999–2000	Chester City	14	(4)
2000	→ Joe Public (loan)		
2001–2005	San Juan Jabloteh	20+	(4+)

International career
1994–2005	Trinidad and Tobago	117	(34)

Managerial career
- 2021–2024: Trinidad and Tobago
- 2021–2023: Trinidad and Tobago U20
- 2025–2026: Montserrat
- * Club domestic league appearances and goals

Angus Eve (born 23 February 1972) is a Trinidadian former professional footballer who recently was the head coach of the Montserrat national team. With 117 caps he is his country's most capped player of all time.

== Playing career ==
Eve played with Joe Public of Trinidad, on loan from Chester City of England. Eve is Chester's most capped player, although many of his caps were won while out on loan and he only made 14 Football League appearances for Chester in the 1999–2000 season. They were relegated at the end of the season, with Eve missing several games because of international duty.

Eve made his debut for the Trinidad and Tobago national team in a 4 April 1994 Copa Caribe game against Barbados. He went on to become a monumental figure for the national team. He earned 117 caps in those years, scoring 34 goals, and helped lead the team in three different rounds of World Cup qualifiers. He retired from international football after not being considered for the Trinidad and Tobago squad for the 2006 FIFA World Cup.

Eve joined San Juan Jabloteh prior to the 2001 Trinidad season as a defender.

== Managerial career ==
Eve was an assistant coach at San Juan Jabloteh, working with former England international Terry Fenwick. In April 2009 he joined Ma Pau Stars as the assistant coach.

On 26 May 2011, he was appointed manager for the Trinidad and Tobago U23 for the Olympic Qualifiers that were played in July 2011.

On 15 June 2021, Eve was appointed interim head coach of the Trinidad and Tobago national team following the dismissal of Fenwick who failed to guide the team past the first round of the 2022 FIFA World Cup qualification. He was officially named head coach of the national team as well as the Trinidad and Tobago U20 on 2 September 2021. Eve left the job on 31 July 2024.

== Career statistics ==
Scores and results list Trinidad and Tobago's goal tally first, score column indicates score after each Eve goal.

List of international goals scored by Angus Eve
No.	Date	Venue	Opponent	Score	Result	Competition
1	17 April 1994	Queen's Park Oval, Port-of-Spain, Trinidad and Tobago	Martinique	1–0	7–2	1994 Caribbean Cup
2	17 April 1994	Queen's Park Oval, Port-of-Spain, Trinidad and Tobago	Martinique	2–0	7–2	1994 Caribbean Cup
3	4 June 1994	Stockton University, Galloway, United States of America	Saudi Arabia	3–1	3–2	Friendly
4	4 June 1994	Stockton University, Galloway, United States of America	Saudi Arabia	3–2	3–2	Friendly
5	19 July 1995	National Stadium, Kingston, Jamaica	Cuba	1–0	2–0	1995 Caribbean Cup
6	19 July 1995	National Stadium, Kingston, Jamaica	Cuba	2–0	2–0	1995 Caribbean Cup
7	21 July 1995	Jarrett Park, Montego Bay, Jamaica	Saint Lucia	5–0	5–0	1995 Caribbean Cup
8	28 July 1995	Truman Bodden Sports Complex, George Town, Cayman Islands	Cayman Islands	—	9–2	1995 Caribbean Cup
9	28 July 1995	Truman Bodden Sports Complex, George Town, Cayman Islands	Cayman Islands	—	9–2	1995 Caribbean Cup
10	30 July 1995	Truman Bodden Sports Complex, George Town, Cayman Islands	Saint Vincent and the Grenadines	1–0	5–0	1995 Caribbean Cup
11	6 March 1996	Miami Orange Bowl, Miami, United States of America	Haiti	2–0	2–0	Friendly
12	15 June 1996	Estadio Olímpico Juan Pablo Duarte, Santo Domingo, Dominican Republic	Dominican Republic	4–1	4–1	1998 FIFA World Cup qualification
13	23 June 1996	Queen's Park Oval, Port-of-Spain, Trinidad and Tobago	Dominican Republic	3–0	8–0	1998 FIFA World Cup qualification
14	23 June 1996	Queen's Park Oval, Port-of-Spain, Trinidad and Tobago	Dominican Republic	6–0	8–0	1998 FIFA World Cup qualification
15	8 December 1996	Los Angeles Memorial Coliseum, Los Angeles, United States of America	Guatemala	1–1	1–2	1998 FIFA World Cup qualification
16	2 April 1997	Arima Municipal Stadium, Arima, Trinidad and Tobago	Guyana	—	3–0	Friendly
17	5 June 1996	Hasely Crawford Stadium, Port of Spain, Trinidad and Tobago	Grenada	3–0	7–0	1999 Caribbean Cup
18	11 June 1999	Hasely Crawford Stadium, Port of Spain, Trinidad and Tobago	Haiti	2–0	6–1	1999 Caribbean Cup
19	12 October 1999	Estadio Rommel Fernández, Panama City, Panama	Panama	2–1	2–2	Friendly
20	4 March 2000	Marvin Lee Stadium, Macoya, Trinidad and Tobago	Netherlands Antilles	2–0	5–0	2002 FIFA World Cup qualification
21	4 March 2000	Marvin Lee Stadium, Macoya, Trinidad and Tobago	Netherlands Antilles	3–0	5–0	2002 FIFA World Cup qualification
22	2 April 2000	Queen's Park Oval, Port-of-Spain, Trinidad and Tobago	Dominican Republic	2–0	3–0	2002 FIFA World Cup qualification
23	4 July 2000	Marvin Lee Stadium, Macoya, Trinidad and Tobago	Cuba	—	4–1	Friendly
24	16 July 2000	Commonwealth Stadium, Edmonton, Canada	Canada	1–0	2–0	2002 FIFA World Cup qualification
25	16 August 2000	Queen's Park Oval, Port-of-Spain, Trinidad and Tobago	Panama	4–0	6–0	2002 FIFA World Cup qualification
26	3 September 2000	Queen's Park Oval, Port-of-Spain, Trinidad and Tobago	Canada	4–0	4–0	2002 FIFA World Cup qualification
27	27 January 2001	Queen's Park National Stadium, St George's, Grenada	Grenada	2–1	2–1	Friendly
28	10 May 2001	Hasley Crawford Stadium, Port of Spain, Trinidad and Tobago	Grenada	—	5–3	Friendly
29	17 May 2001	Hasley Crawford Stadium, Port of Spain, Trinidad and Tobago	Jamaica	1–1	2–1	2001 Caribbean Cup
30	24 June 2001	Bermuda National Stadium, Prospect, Bermuda	Bermuda	3–0	5–0	Friendly
31	3 August 2001	Shanghai Stadium, Shanghai, China	Kuwait	1–1	1–1	2001 Four Nations Tournament
32	17 November 2004	Hasley Crawford Stadium, Port of Spain, Trinidad and Tobago	Saint Vincent and the Grenadines	2–1	2–1	2006 FIFA World Cup qualification
33	19 December 2004	Marvin Lee Stadium, Macoya, Trinidad and Tobago	British Virgin Islands	2–0	2–0	2005 Caribbean Cup qualification
34	9 February 2005	Queen's Park Oval, Port-of-Spain, Trinidad and Tobago	United States	2–1	2–1	2006 FIFA World Cup qualification
35	24 February 2005	Barbados National Stadium, St Micheal, Barbados	Barbados	3–1	3–2	2005 Caribbean Cup

== See also ==
- List of men's footballers with 100 or more international caps
