= Stanley Lewis =

Stanley Lewis may refer to:

- J. E. Stanley Lewis (1888–1970), mayor of Ottawa, 1936–1948
- C. Stanley Lewis, artist, Guggenheim Fellow
- Stanley Lewis (sculptor) (1930–2006), Montreal sculptor, 1930–2004
- Stanley Cornwell Lewis (1905–2009), British portrait painter and illustrator
- Stan Lewis (record label owner) (1927–2018), American record label owner and songwriter
- Stan Lewis (American football) (born 1953), American football player

== See also ==
- Stanton Lewis (disambiguation)
