= Thomas Eliot =

Thomas Eliot, Elliot, or Elyot may refer to:

== Eliot ==
- Thomas Eliot (died 1626), son of Sir John Eliot
- Thomas D. Eliot (1808–1870), US Representative from Massachusetts
- Thomas Lamb Eliot (1841–1936), Oregon pioneer
- T. S. Eliot (Thomas Stearns Eliot, 1888–1965), modernist author and poet
- Thomas H. Eliot (1907–1991), American lawyer, politician and academic

== Elliot ==
- Thomas Elliot (organ builder) (1759–1832), English organ builder
- Thomas Frederick Elliot (1808–1880), British government official, appointed Agent-General for Emigration in 1837
- Tom Elliot (rugby union, born 1880) (1880–1948), Scotland international rugby union player
- Tom Elliot (1926–1998), Scotland international rugby union player
- Tommy Elliot (born 1941), Scotland international rugby union player
- Thomas Elliot (footballer) (born 1979), Caymanian footballer
- Hush (character) or Tommy Elliot, a comic book character

== Elyot ==
- Thomas Elyot (c.1496–1546), English diplomat and scholar

== See also ==
- Thomas Elliot Harrison (1808–1888), British engineer
- Thomas Elliott (disambiguation)
