= 1998 Caribbean Cup =

Shell Caribbean Cup

Tournament details
- Host countries: Trinidad and Tobago; Jamaica
- Dates: 22–31 July 1998
- Teams: 8

Final positions
- Champions: Jamaica (2nd title)
- Runners-up: Trinidad and Tobago
- Third place: Haiti
- Fourth place: Antigua and Barbuda

Tournament statistics
- Matches played: 16
- Goals scored: 64 (4 per match)
- Top scorer: (Trinidad and Tobago) Stern John (10 goals)

The 1998 Caribbean Cup, known as the Shell Caribbean Cup for sponsorship reasons, was the 16th international association football championship for members of the Caribbean Football Union (CFU). It was the 10th edition of the Caribbean Cup which replaced the CFU Championship. Hosted by Jamaica and Trinidad and Tobago, the competition ran from 22–31 July 1998 and was contested by the national teams of Antigua and Barbuda, Cayman Islands, Dominica, Haiti, Jamaica, Martinique, Netherlands Antilles and Trinidad and Tobago.

The final tournament began with the first matches in the group stage on 22 July 1997 and ended with the final on 31 July 1997. Jamaica defeated hosts and four-time defending champions Trinidad and Tobago 2–1 in the final to win the competition for the second time.

== Background ==
The Caribbean Football Union (CFU) was founded in January 1978 as a sub-confederation of the Confederation of North, Central America and Caribbean Association Football (CONCACAF). Later the same year, the first CFU Championship was organised in Trinidad and Tobago. The competition was held semi-regularly until the final edition in 1988. From 1989, it was replaced by the Caribbean Cup.

The tournament was sponsored by Royal Dutch Shell following the input of employees of Shell Antilles and Gulanas Ltd.

Trinidad and Tobago were four-time defending champions after winning the previous four editions in 1994, 1995, 1996 and 1997. Trinidad and Tobago were also the most successful team in the history of the competition after winning the trophy on six previous occasions.

Cuba was represented by an under-20 side.

== Format ==
A qualifying tournament was held to determine six of the eight teams that would participate in the final tournament. Co-hosts Jamaica and Trinidad and Tobago qualified automatically. The 24 competing teams were drawn into six groups of four teams. Each group was played as a round-robin where each team would play all of the others once. The winner of each group would qualify for the final tournament.

For the final tournament, the eight teams were drawn into two groups of four teams. Each group was played as a single round-robin where each team would play all of the others once. The winners and runners-up of each group would contest the semi-finals with the winners advancing to the final and the losers contesting the third-place play-off.

=== Participants ===
- Antigua and Barbuda
- Anguilla
- Aruba
- British Virgin Islands
- Barbados
- Bermuda
- Cayman Islands
- Cuba
- Dominica
- Dominican Republic
- French Guiana
- Grenada
- Guadeloupe
- Guyana
- Haiti
- Jamaica
- Martinique
- Netherlands Antilles
- Puerto Rico
- Saint Kitts and Nevis
- Saint Lucia
- Saint Vincent and the Grenadines
- Sint Maarten
- Suriname
- Trinidad and Tobago
- U.S. Virgin Islands
- Turks and Caicos Islands

== Qualifying tournament ==
=== Group 1 ===
Qualifying group 1, held in Aruba, was played between 3 and 7 March 1998. The Netherlands Antilles qualified as group winners after defeating French Guiana 2–1 in their final match.

==== Table ====
| Pos | Team | Pld | W | D | L | GF | GA | GD | Pts | Qualification |
|---|---|---|---|---|---|---|---|---|---|---|
| 1 | Netherlands Antilles | 3 | 2 | 1 | 0 | 6 | 4 | +2 | 7 | Qualification for 1998 Caribbean Cup |
| 2 | Aruba | 3 | 1 | 1 | 1 | 4 | 4 | 0 | 4 | |
| 3 | Suriname | 3 | 0 | 3 | 0 | 8 | 8 | 0 | 3 | |
| 4 | French Guiana | 3 | 0 | 1 | 2 | 3 | 5 | −2 | 1 | |

==== Results ====
3 March 1998

| Aruba | 1–0 | French Guiana |

3 March 1998

| Suriname | 3–3 | Netherlands Antilles |

5 March 1998

| Suriname | 2–2 | French Guiana |

5 March 1998

| Aruba | 0–1 | Netherlands Antilles |

7 March 1998

| Netherlands Antilles | 2–1 | French Guiana |

7 March 1998

| Aruba | 3–3 | Suriname |

=== Group 2 ===
Qualifying group 2, held in Saint Lucia, was played between 18 and 22 March 1998. Martinique qualified as group winners on goal difference after defeating Saint Lucia 2–1 in their final match.

==== Table ====
| Pos | Team | Pld | W | D | L | GF | GA | GD | Pts | Qualification |
|---|---|---|---|---|---|---|---|---|---|---|
| 1 | Martinique | 3 | 2 | 0 | 1 | 7 | 6 | +1 | 6 | Qualification for 1998 Caribbean Cup |
| 2 | Saint Lucia | 3 | 2 | 0 | 1 | 6 | 5 | +1 | 6 | |
| 3 | Saint Vincent and the Grenadines | 3 | 1 | 0 | 2 | 9 | 8 | +1 | 3 | |
| 4 | Barbados | 3 | 1 | 0 | 2 | 6 | 9 | −3 | 3 | |

==== Results ====
18 March 1998

| Saint Lucia | 2–1 | Barbados |

Castries
18 March 1998

| Saint Vincent and the Grenadines | 4–1 | Martinique |

Castries

20 March 1998

| Martinique | 4–1 | Barbados |

Castries
20 March 1998

| Saint Lucia | 3–2 | Saint Vincent and the Grenadines |

Castries

22 March 1998

| Saint Lucia | 1–2 | Martinique |

Castries
22 March 1998

| Barbados | 4–3 | Saint Vincent and the Grenadines |

Castries

=== Group 3 ===
Qualifying group 3, held in Saint Kitts and Nevis, was played between 1 and 5 April 1998. Dominica qualified as group winners after defeating the British Virgin Islands 4–1 in their final match.

==== Table ====
| Pos | Team | Pld | W | D | L | GF | GA | GD | Pts | Qualification |
|---|---|---|---|---|---|---|---|---|---|---|
| 1 | Dominica | 3 | 2 | 1 | 0 | 7 | 3 | +4 | 7 | Qualification for 1998 Caribbean Cup |
| 2 | Saint Kitts and Nevis | 3 | 2 | 0 | 1 | 7 | 3 | +4 | 6 | |
| 3 | Guadeloupe | 3 | 1 | 1 | 1 | 5 | 3 | +2 | 4 | |
| 4 | British Virgin Islands | 3 | 0 | 0 | 3 | 1 | 11 | −10 | 0 | |

==== Results ====
1 April 1998

| Saint Kitts and Nevis | 4–0 | British Virgin Islands |

1 April 1998

| Dominica | 1–1 | Guadeloupe |

3 April 1998

| Saint Kitts and Nevis | 1–2 | Dominica |

3 April 1998

| Guadeloupe | 3–0 | British Virgin Islands |

5 April 1998

| Saint Kitts and Nevis | 2–1 | Guadeloupe |

5 April 1998

| Dominica | 4–1 | British Virgin Islands |

=== Group 4 ===
Qualifying group 4, held in Antigua and Barbuda, was played between 15 and 19 April 1998. Antigua and Barbuda qualified as group winners after defeating Grenada 2–1 in their final match.

==== Table ====
| Pos | Team | Pld | W | D | L | GF | GA | GD | Pts | Qualification |
|---|---|---|---|---|---|---|---|---|---|---|
| 1 | Antigua and Barbuda | 3 | 2 | 1 | 0 | 11 | 3 | +8 | 7 | Qualification for 1998 Caribbean Cup |
| 2 | Grenada | 3 | 2 | 0 | 1 | 17 | 4 | +13 | 6 | |
| 3 | Guyana | 3 | 1 | 1 | 1 | 17 | 4 | +13 | 4 | |
| 4 | Anguilla | 3 | 0 | 0 | 3 | 1 | 35 | −34 | 0 | |

==== Results ====
15 April 1998

| Grenada | 14–1 | Anguilla |
|---|---|---|
| J. Roberts 8', 49', 69'; Modeste 10'; Andrew 17'; Charles 21', 24', 35', 76'; O. Roberts 33'; Alexander 52', 67'; Joseph 56'; Augustine 76' | | Heyliger 84' |

Antigua Recreation Ground, St. John's
15 April 1998

| Antigua and Barbuda | 2–2 | Guyana |
|---|---|---|
| D. Edwards 20', 40' | | Hercules 26'; Nassy 70' |

Antigua Recreation Ground, St. John's

17 April 1998

| Antigua and Barbuda | 7–0 | Anguilla |

Antigua Recreation Ground, St. John's
17 April 1998

| Grenada | 2–1 | Guyana |
|---|---|---|
| J. Roberts 20'; Alexander 36' | | Jerome 83' |

Antigua Recreation Ground, St. John's

19 April 1998

| Antigua and Barbuda | 2–1 | Grenada |

Antigua Recreation Ground, St. John's
19 April 1998

| Guyana | 14–0 | Anguilla |
|---|---|---|
| Hercules (4); Nassy (3); Scott (3); Jerome (2); Wong; Milo |

Antigua Recreation Ground, St. John's

=== Group 5 ===
Qualifying group 5, held in Haiti, was played between 11 and 15 March 1998. The United States Virgin Islands withdrew. Haiti qualified as group winners after defeating the Dominican Republic 5–0 in their final match.

==== Table ====
| Pos | Team | Pld | W | D | L | GF | GA | GD | Pts | Qualification |
|---|---|---|---|---|---|---|---|---|---|---|
| 1 | Haiti | 2 | 2 | 0 | 0 | 9 | 0 | +9 | 6 | Qualification for 1998 Caribbean Cup |
| 2 | Dominican Republic | 2 | 1 | 0 | 1 | 3 | 6 | −3 | 3 | |
| 3 | Puerto Rico | 2 | 0 | 0 | 2 | 1 | 7 | −6 | 0 | |

==== Results ====
11 March 1998

| Haiti | 4–0 | Puerto Rico |

Stade Sylvio Cator, Port-au-Prince

13 March 1998

| Dominican Republic | 3–1 | Puerto Rico |

Stade Sylvio Cator, Port-au-Prince

15 March 1998

| Haiti | 5–0 | Dominican Republic |

Stade Sylvio Cator, Port-au-Prince

=== Group 6 ===
Qualifying group 6, held in the Cayman Islands, was played between 6 and 10 March 1998. The Turks and Caicos Islands withdrew. The Cayman Islands qualified as group winners on goal difference after defeating Bermuda 2–0 in their final match.

==== Table ====
| Pos | Team | Pld | W | D | L | GF | GA | GD | Pts | Qualification |
|---|---|---|---|---|---|---|---|---|---|---|
| 1 | Cayman Islands | 2 | 1 | 1 | 0 | 4 | 2 | +2 | 4 | Qualification for 1998 Caribbean Cup |
| 2 | Cuba | 2 | 1 | 1 | 0 | 4 | 3 | +1 | 4 | |
| 3 | Bermuda | 2 | 0 | 0 | 2 | 1 | 4 | −3 | 0 | |

==== Results ====
6 May 1998

| Cayman Islands | 2–2 | Cuba |

8 May 1998

| Cuba | 2–1 | Bermuda |

10 May 1998

| Cayman Islands | 2–0 | Bermuda |
|---|---|---|
| Ramoon 22', 70' |

== Final tournament ==
=== Group stage ===
==== Group A ====
In group A, Trinidad and Tobago advanced to the semi-finals as group winners after winning all three of their matches. Antigua and Barbuda also advanced as runners-up after a 5–1 win against Martinique in their final match.

===== Table =====
| Pos | Team | Pld | W | D | L | GF | GA | GD | Pts | Qualification |
|---|---|---|---|---|---|---|---|---|---|---|
| 1 | Trinidad and Tobago | 3 | 3 | 0 | 0 | 13 | 3 | +10 | 9 | Qualification for the semi-finals |
| 2 | Antigua and Barbuda | 3 | 2 | 0 | 1 | 9 | 5 | +4 | 6 | Qualification for the semi-finals |
| 3 | Martinique | 3 | 1 | 0 | 2 | 7 | 8 | −1 | 3 | |
| 4 | Dominica | 3 | 0 | 0 | 3 | 2 | 15 | −13 | 0 | |

===== Results =====
22 Jul 1998

| Trinidad and Tobago | 3–2 | Antigua and Barbuda |
|---|---|---|
| Knights 13', 29'; John 39' | | Christian 37'; Edwards 85' |

Hasely Crawford Stadium, Port of Spain
22 Jul 1998

| Martinique | 5–1 | Dominica |
|---|---|---|
| Rano 28', 29', 42', 72'; Modestin 88' | | Gustave 63' |

Hasely Crawford Stadium, Port of Spain

24 Jul 1998

| Trinidad and Tobago | 2–1 | Martinique |
|---|---|---|
| John 56', 90' | | Sorbert 79' |

Hasely Crawford Stadium, Port of Spain
24 Jul 1998

| Antigua and Barbuda | 2–1 | Dominica |
|---|---|---|
| Edwards 6'; Roberts 51' | | Gustave 59' |

Hasely Crawford Stadium, Port of Spain

26 Jul 1998

| Trinidad and Tobago | 8–0 | Dominica |
|---|---|---|
| John 19', 22', 59', 84'; Nakhid 41', 50'; Knights 76', 88' |

Hasely Crawford Stadium, Port of Spain
26 Jul 1998

| Antigua and Barbuda | 5–1 | Martinique |
|---|---|---|
| Greenaway 17'; Edwards 42'; Roberts 49'; Clarke 60'; Gonsalves 89' | | Fondelot 18' |

Hasely Crawford Stadium, Port of Spain

==== Group B ====
In group B, Jamaica advanced to the semi-finals as group winners after winning all three of their matches. Haiti also advanced as runners-up after defeating the Cayman Islands 2–0 in their second match.

===== Table =====
| Pos | Team | Pld | W | D | L | GF | GA | GD | Pts | Qualification |
|---|---|---|---|---|---|---|---|---|---|---|
| 1 | Jamaica | 3 | 3 | 0 | 0 | 9 | 3 | +6 | 9 | Qualification for the semi-finals |
| 2 | Haiti | 3 | 2 | 0 | 1 | 6 | 2 | +4 | 6 | Qualification for the semi-finals |
| 3 | Cayman Islands | 3 | 1 | 0 | 2 | 2 | 5 | −3 | 3 | |
| 4 | Netherlands Antilles | 3 | 0 | 0 | 3 | 2 | 9 | −7 | 0 | |

===== Results =====
22 Jul 1998

| Jamaica | 4–0 | Cayman Islands |
|---|---|---|
| Goodison 17'; Gardener 70'; Whitmore 76', 86' |

National Stadium, Kingston
22 Jul 1998

| Haiti | 4–0 | Netherlands Antilles |
|---|---|---|
| Menelas 42'; Fleurial 70'; Dartiquenave 82', 87' |

National Stadium, Kingston

24 Jul 1998

| Jamaica | 3–2 | Netherlands Antilles |
|---|---|---|
| Lowe 1'; Goodison 40'; Boyd 88' | | Rosina 34'; Martjin 90' |

National Stadium, Kingston
24 Jul 1998

| Haiti | 1–0 | Cayman Islands |
|---|---|---|
| Fleurial |

National Stadium, Kingston

26 Jul 1998

| Jamaica | 2–1 | Haiti |
|---|---|---|
| Goodison 51'; McDonald 83' | | Montilas 86' |

National Stadium, Kingston
26 Jul 1998

| Cayman Islands | 2–0 | Netherlands Antilles |
|---|---|---|
| Brown 21'; Ramoon 45' |

Saint Thomas

=== Knockout stage ===
Knockout phase
| Team 1 | Score | Team 2 |
|---|---|---|
Semi-finals
| Jamaica | 1–0 (asdet) | Antigua and Barbuda |
| Trinidad and Tobago | 4–1 | Haiti |
Third-place play-off
| Haiti | 3–2 | Antigua and Barbuda |
Final
| Jamaica | 2–1 | Trinidad and Tobago |

==== Semi-finals ====
Group winners Jamaica and Trinidad and Tobago both advanced to the final after defeating Antigua and Barbuda and Haiti respectively.

29 July 1998

| Jamaica | 1–0 (a.s.d.e.t.) | Antigua and Barbuda |
|---|---|---|
| Lowe 110' |

29 July 1998

| Trinidad and Tobago | 4–1 | Haiti |
|---|---|---|
| John 1', 60'; Knights 15', 42' | | Cesar 85' |

==== Third-place play-off ====
Haiti defeated Antigua and Barbuda 3–2 to finish third.

31 July 1998

| Haiti | 3–2 | Antigua and Barbuda |
|---|---|---|
| Fleurial 72'; Menelas 27'; Mackenzy 71' | | Christopher 53'; Christian 58' |

==== Final ====
Goals from Oneil McDonald and Dean Sewell helped Jamaica to a 2–1 win as they won the competition for the second time.

31 July 1998

| Jamaica | 2–1 | Trinidad and Tobago |
|---|---|---|
| McDonald 6'; Sewell 34' | | John 48' |
