= Stanton Lewis =

Stanton Lewis refers to:

- Stanton Lewis (footballer born 1974), Bermudian footballer
- Stanton Lewis (footballer born 1987), South African footballer
