= Dieuphène Thélamour =

Haitian footballer (born 1979)

Personal information
- Date of birth: 17 July 1979 (age 47)
- Position: Striker

Senior career*
Years	Team	Apps	(Gls)
2000–2001	Racing Club Haitien		
2001–2002	Happy Valley		
2002–2006	Racing Gonaïves		
2007–2015	Racing Club Haitien		

International career
2000–2004	Haiti	13	(5)
- * Club domestic league appearances and goals

Dieuphène Thélamour (born 17 July 1979) is a Haitian former professional footballer who played as a striker.

== Career statistics ==
=== International ===
Appearances and goals by national team and year
National team	Year	Apps	Goals
Haiti	2000	4	2
Haiti	2001	–	
Haiti	2002	–	
Haiti	2003	–	
Haiti	2004	9	3
Total		13	5

Scores and results list Haiti's goal tally first, score column indicates score after each Thélamour goal.

List of international goals scored by Dieuphène Thélamour
No.	Date	Venue	Opponent	Score	Result	Competition
1	19 May 2000	Stade Sylvio Cator, Port-au-Prince, Haiti	Trinidad and Tobago	1–1	1–1	2002 FIFA World Cup qualification
2	6 August 2000	Foxboro Stadium, Foxborough, United States	El Salvador	1–1	2–1	Friendly
3	31 January 2004	John Leonard Stadium, Greenacres, United States	Nicaragua	1–1	1–1	Friendly
4	24 November 2004	Independence Park, Kingston, Jamaica	U.S. Virgin Islands	10–0	11–0	2005 Caribbean Cup qualification
5	26 November 2004	Jarrett Park, Montego Bay, Jamaica	Saint Martin	2–0	2–0	2005 Caribbean Cup qualification
