= Jean-Robert Menelas =

Haitian footballer (born 1972)

Personal information
- Date of birth: 11 December 1972 (age 53)
- Place of birth: Haiti
- Position: Striker

Senior career*
| Years | Team | Apps | (Gls) |
| 1993–2007 | Roulado | | (158) |

International career
| 1998–2003 | Haiti | 18 | (10) |
- * Club domestic league appearances and goals

Jean Robert Menelas (born 11 December 1972) is a Haitian footballer who has played for the Haiti national football team. He played striker for Roulado, a club from the Gonâve Island with which he won the Ligue Haïtienne on the occasions: 2002 and 2003. For the 2002 season he was also the league's topscorer.

As of 2008, Menelas has become the all-time leading goalscorer in the Haitian top division during 14 years playing for Roulado, his only club. He is considered to be the best player in the history of Roulado, and one of the best strikers of his generation in Haiti. The club retired his number 7 jersey; the first in the history of Haitian football that a number would be permanently removed.

== Club career ==
Jean-Robert Menelaus spent his entire career for Roulado, a club on the island of Gonâve Island, Haiti. He became the club's captain, winning the Haitian championship in consecutive years, in 2002 and 2003. In 1993, he helped lift the club to Division 1, as he finished as the top scorer in Division 2 with a record-setting 22 goals, that had withstood for eleven years before being broken by Roobens Phillogène ("Paloulou") with 23 goals for Ouanaminthe. Menelaus has registered 158 goals, with 116 coming in Division 1.

== International career ==
Menelas has eighteen caps for the Haiti national team, scoring eight goals leading the selection to the 2000 CONCACAF Gold Cup.

=== International goals ===
Scores and results list Haiti's goal tally first.

| No | Date | Venue | Opponent | Score | Result | Competition |
|---|---|---|---|---|---|---|
| 1. | 22 July 1998 | Independence Park, Kingston, Jamaica | Netherlands Antilles | 1–0 | 4–0 | 1998 Caribbean Cup |
| 2. | 31 July 1998 | Hasely Crawford Stadium, Port of Spain, Trinidad and Tobago | Antigua and Barbuda | 1–0 | 3–2 | 1998 Caribbean Cup |
| 3. | 11 March 2000 | Stade Sylvio Cator, Port-au-Prince, Haiti | Dominica | 3–0 | 4–0 | 2002 FIFA World Cup qualification |
| 4. | 1 April 2000 | Stade Sylvio Cator, Port-au-Prince, Haiti | Bahamas | 3–0 | 9–0 | 2002 FIFA World Cup qualification |
| 5. | 1 April 2000 | Stade Sylvio Cator, Port-au-Prince, Haiti | Bahamas | 5–0 | 9–0 | 2002 FIFA World Cup qualification |
| 6. | 1 April 2000 | Stade Sylvio Cator, Port-au-Prince, Haiti | Bahamas | 8–0 | 9–0 | 2002 FIFA World Cup qualification |
| 7. | 22 November 2002 | Stade Sylvio Cator, Port-au-Prince, Haiti | Netherlands Antilles | 3–0 | 3–0 | 2003 CONCACAF Gold Cup qualification |
| 8. | 23 February 2003 | Estadio Alejandro Villanueva, Lima, Peru | Peru | 1–3 | 1–5 | Friendly |
| 9. | 26 March 2003 | Independence Stadium, Kingston, Jamaica | Martinique | 1–1 | 3–1 | 200e CONCACAF Gold Cup qualification |
| 10. | 26 March 2003 | Independence Stadium, Kingston, Jamaica | Martinique | 2–1 | 3–1 | 200e CONCACAF Gold Cup qualification |

== Honours ==
=== Club ===
- Ligue Haïtienne (2): 2002, 2003

=== Individual ===
- Number 7 retired by Roulado in recognition of his career in the club

==== Performances ====
- Ligue Haïtienne top goalscorer: 2002

==== Records ====
- Top goalscorer in Ligue Haïtienne: 116 goals.
