= Haitian Football Federation =

Governing body of association football in Haiti

CONCACAF
- Founded: 1904; 122 years ago
- Headquarters: Port-au-Prince, Haiti
- FIFA affiliation: 1934
- CONCACAF affiliation: 1961
- President: Marie Monique André
- Website: fhf.ht

The Haitian Football Federation (FHF; French: Fédération Haïtienne de Football, Haitian Creole: Federasyon Foutbòl Ayisyen) is the governing body for football in Haiti. The FHF is responsible for overseeing all aspects of the game of football in Haiti, both professional and amateur. A member of CONCACAF since 1961, FHF is in charge of football in Haiti and all lower categories. The principal sporting field is the Sylvio Cator stadium in Port-au-Prince. It is a founding member of CONCACAF.

== Federal Council ==
Member	Role	Notes
Yves Jean-Bart	President	Elected for fifth time in January 2016, and has held its position since the year 2000.He was penalized 20,000 Swiss Francs in order to be reinstated by FIFA, yet none of the women who accused him appear at the hearing, but they continue to play abroad using Haiti's name eventhough some of them never been to Haiti, but stayed in hotels in the Dominican Republic.
Julio Cadet	Vice-President	
Carlo Marcelin	General secretary	
Frantz Calixte	Treasurer	
Wilner Etienne	Technical director	

=== Staff ===
Name	Position	Source
(Haiti) Monqiue Andre	Chairperson of the Normalization Committee	
n/a	Vice President	
(Haiti) Patriick Massenat	General Secretary	
n/a	Treasurer	
(Haiti) Pierre Cherry	Technical Director	
(France) Sébastien Migné	Team Coach (Men's)	
(France) Malou Quignette	Team Coach (Women's)	
(Haiti) Louis Charles	Media/Communications Manager	
(Haiti) Frederic Aupont	Futsal Coordinator	
(Haiti) Wilson Tolus	Chairperson of the Referees Committee	
(Haiti) Wilson Tolus	Head/Director of the Referees Department	
(Haiti) Joseph Marckingson Natoux	Referee Coordinator	

- Men's Coach: (Haiti) Jean-Jacques Pierre
- Men's Assistant Coach: (Haiti) Pierre Roland Saint-Jean
- Women's Coach: (Haiti) Laurent Molter
- Women's Director: (Poland) Shek Borkowski
- Women's Assistant Coach: (Ecuador) Christian Castro
- U20 Coach: (Cuba) Manuel Rodriguez Navarro
- U17 Coach: (Haiti) Chery Pierre
- U17 Coach: (Haiti) Gabriel Michel
- U15 Coach: (Cuba) Julio Cesar Alvarez Perez
- Fitness: (Cuba) Gregorio B. Modesto Gomez
- Academy: (Cuba) Gregorio B. Modesto Gomez

== 2010 earthquake ==
The federation, which had struggled financially for years, lost all but two of its more than 30 officials during the 2010 earthquake. Also because of the earthquake, the national stadium's field, as well as many other stadiums, were converted to be used as housing for survivors and refugees in makeshift tents. Due to the financial and personal losses of the federation, large financial sums were donated by FIFA and globally–high-ranking individuals within the sport, as well as a $3 million fund for rebuilding infrastructure that had been created by FIFA. There was discussion to build another stadium with funds proceeded from the Petrocaribe Fund during the Michel Martelly administration from 2011-2016, but no action was taken and the monies went unaccounted for, and Olivier Martelly, one of the sons of Michel Martelly blamed it on politics in the country.

== Camp Nous ==
Camp Nous is the Haitian Football Federation operated training centre and academy for Haitian football players in Croix-des-Bouquets. It was inaugurated in May 2012.

== See also ==
- Haiti national football team
- Haiti women's national football team
- Haiti national under-23 football team
- Haiti national under-20 football team
- Haiti national under-17 football team
- Haiti national under-15 football team
- Ligue Haïtienne
- Coupe d'Haïti
