= Irasto Knights =

Trinidadian footballer (born 1978)

Personal information
- Date of birth: 17 September 1978 (age 48)
- Place of birth: Morvant, Trinidad and Tobago
- Position: Forward

Senior career*
Years	Team	Apps	(Gls)
1998	Caledonia AIA	27	(13)
1999	Raleigh Capital Express	21	(6)
2000	Long Island Rough Riders	17	(8)
2001	Connecticut Wolves	6	(1)
2002	Toronto Lynx	20	(1)
2003	Alianza Atlético	3	(0)

International career
1998–1999	Trinidad and Tobago	7	(6)
- * Club domestic league appearances and goals

Irasto Knights (born 17 September 1978) is a Trinidadian former professional footballer who played for the Trinidad and Tobago national team and played the majority of his career in North America, particularly in the USL A-League.

== Playing career ==
Knights began his career in his native country with Caledonia AIA, where he had a tremendous rookie season scoring 13 goals. That same year due to his success with his domestic club he was called up to the national team to complete in the 1998 Caribbean Cup. The following year he went abroad to the United States and signed with the Raleigh Capital Express of the USL A-League where he continued his success by scoring six goals in 21 matches. In 2000, he signed with the Long Island Rough Riders where he managed to claim some silverware by clinching the Northeast Conference. In the postseason the club reached the conference quarterfinals, but lost to the Toronto Lynx.

The next year he had a stint with the Connecticut Wolves, and in 2002 he went to Canada to play with the Toronto Lynx. His signing was announced in a press conference which announced the 2002 team roster. He made his debut for the club on 20 April 2002 in a match against the Pittsburgh Riverhounds, where he recorded an assist in a 2–1 loss. He featured in an exhibition match against 1860 Munich where he scored the historic winning goal in a 1–0 victory over a Bundesliga club. Throuogout the year the Lynx finished in second place in the inaugural Voyageurs Cup, losing to the Montreal Impact. The Lynx struggled early on in the season but then went on six game undefeated streak at home, and only needed one win on the final game of the season to make the playoffs; but the team tied with Atlanta Silverbacks allowing the Charlotte Eagles to clinch the final playoff berth. In 2003, he went to South America to sign with Peruvian side Alianza Atlético where he appeared in three matches.

== International career ==
Knights played for the Trinidad and Tobago national football team in 1998, where he featured in the 1998 Caribbean Cup. In the tournament he scored six goals in wins over Antigua and Barbuda and Dominica in the group stage, respectively, and two more goals in the 4-1 win to Haiti in the semifinals.
