= Benny Kejansi =

Surinamese footballer

Personal information
- Date of birth: 16 December 1973 (age 52)
- Place of birth: Suriname
- Position: Forward

Senior career*
Years	Team	Apps	(Gls)
1999–2008	Inter Moengotapoe		

International career
1996–2002	Suriname	13	(7)
- * Club domestic league appearances and goals

Benny Kejansi (born 16 December 1973) is a Surinamese retired footballer who played as a forward for Inter Moengotapoe in the Hoofdklasse, and for the Suriname national team.

== Club career ==
Kejansi began his career in the SVB Hoofdklasse. He played for Inter Moengotapoe in Moengo finishing his second season as the league's joint top goalscorer together with Ifenildo Vlijter (of House of Billiards) finishing with 24 goals each.

== International career ==
Kejansi has played for the Suriname national team having made his debut on 31 March 1996 in a 1–0 loss to Jamaica. he has made 13 official appearances in qualifying campaigns for the FIFA World Cup, CONCACAF Gold Cup and the Caribbean Cup.

== Career statistics ==
Appearances and goals by national team and year
National team	Year	Apps	Goals
Suriname	1996	3	1
Suriname	1997	0	0
Suriname	1998	0	0
Suriname	1999	0	0
Suriname	2000	3	0
Suriname	2001	5	3
Suriname	2002	2	3
Total		13	7

Scores and results list Suriname's goal tally first, score column indicates score after each Kejansi goal.

List of international goals scored by Benny Kejansi
No.	Date	Venue	Opponent	Score	Result	Competition
1	30 May 1996	Hasely Crawford Stadium, Port of Spain, Trinidad and Tobago	Saint Kitts and Nevis	1–0	1–1	1996 Caribbean Cup
2	4 April 2001	André Kamperveen Stadion, Paramaribo, Suriname	Aruba	4–0	5–0	2001 Caribbean Cup qualification
3	8 April 2001	André Kamperveen Stadion, Paramaribo, Suriname	Grenada	1–0	3–1	2001 Caribbean Cup qualification
4	16 May 2001	Marvin Lee Stadium, Macoya, Trinidad and Tobago	Cuba	1–0	3–4	2001 Caribbean Cup
5	28 July 2002	Trinidad Stadium, Oranjestad, Aruba	Aruba	1–0	2–0	2003 CONCACAF Gold Cup qualification
6	11 August 2002	André Kamperveen Stadion, Paramaribo, Suriname	Aruba	2–0	6–0	2003 CONCACAF Gold Cup qualification
7	11 August 2002	André Kamperveen Stadion, Paramaribo, Suriname	Aruba	4–0	6–0	2003 CONCACAF Gold Cup qualification

== Honors ==
Inter Moengotapoe

- SVB Hoofdklasse: 2006–07, 2007–08
- Suriname President's Cup: 2007

Individual

- SVB Hoofdklasse top goalscorer: 1999–2000 (joint)
