= Gordon Kinsaini =

Surinamese footballer

Personal information
- Full name: Gordon Willem Kinsaini
- Date of birth: July 26, 1981 (age 45)
- Place of birth: Paramaribo, Suriname
- Height: 1.79 m (5 ft 10 in)
- Position: Right winger

Youth career
- Robinhood

Senior career*
Years	Team	Apps	(Gls)
1999–2009	Robinhood		(18)
2009–2013	Leo Victor		

International career^{‡}
2001–2009	Suriname	17	(5)
- * Club domestic league appearances and goals as of October 7, 2015 ‡ National team caps and goals as of October 7, 2015

Gordon Kinsaini (born July 26, 1981) is a Surinamese former footballer who played as a right winger for SV Leo Victor in the Hoofdklasse. He previously played for SV Robinhood, and for the Suriname national team.

== Career ==
Kinsaini began his career at SV Robinhood, making his debut in the 1999-2000 SVB Hoofdklasse. He remained with the club for ten years becoming one of the great figures of the club finishing as joint league top scorer together with Amaktie Maasie (of SV Leo Victor) during the 2002-03 season with 18 goals each.He is known for his pace and creating chances for teammates to score. In 2009, he was transferred to SV Leo Victor.

== International career ==
Kinsaini has played International football for Suriname, having made his debut in the final qualifying round of the 2001 Caribbean Cup, scoring on his debut in the 5-0 win over Aruba. He also participated in the teams' 2006 FIFA World Cup qualification campaign, making four appearances while scoring twice.

== Career statistics ==
=== International ===
Appearances and goals by national team and year
National team	Year	Apps	Goals
Suriname	2001	4	1
Suriname	2002	1	1
Suriname	2003	–	
Suriname	2004	6	2
Suriname	2005	–	
Suriname	2006	5	1
Suriname	2007	–	
Suriname	2008	–	
Suriname	2009	1	0
Total		17	5

Scores and results list Suriname's goal tally first, score column indicates score after each Kinsaini goal.

List of international goals scored by Gordon Kinsaini
No.	Date	Venue	Opponent	Score	Result	Competition
1.	4 April 2001	André Kamperveen Stadion, Paramaribo, Suriname	Aruba	5–1	5–0	2001 Caribbean Cup qualification
2.	11 August 2002	André Kamperveen Stadion, Paramaribo, Suriname	Aruba	5–0	6–0	2003 CONCACAF Gold Cup qualification
3.	27 March 2004	André Kamperveen Stadion, Paramaribo, Suriname	Aruba	1–0	8–1	2006 FIFA World Cup qualification
4.	27 March 2004	André Kamperveen Stadion, Paramaribo, Suriname	Aruba	5–1	8–1	2006 FIFA World Cup qualification
5.	8 September 2006	Stadion Ergilio Hato, Willemstad, Netherlands Antilles	Grenada	1–0	1–0	2007 Caribbean Cup qualification
