= Gary Smith (footballer, born 1966) =

Saint Kitts & Nevis association football player and manager

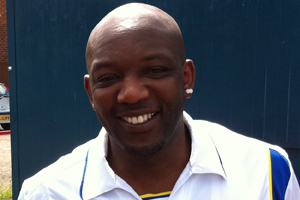
- Smith in May 2011

Personal information
- Date of birth: 13 July 1966 (age 60)
- Place of birth: Birmingham, England
- Position: Forward

Team information
- Current team: Bromsgrove Sporting (assistant)

Senior career*
Years	Team	Apps	(Gls)
- Paget Rangers
–1992	Sutton Coldfield Town		
1992–1995	Worcester City		
1995–2001	Tamworth	221	(70)
2001–2002	Halesowen Town		
2002–2003	Gresley Rovers	26	(7)
2003	Evesham United		
2003–2004	Grosvenor Park		

International career^{‡}
2000–2001	Saint Kitts and Nevis	10	(2)

Managerial career
- 2014–2016: Continental Star
- 2016–2018: Coleshill Town U21
- 2018–2019: Tamworth U21
- 2019–2022: Tamworth
- 2022–: Bromsgrove Sporting (assistant)
- * Club domestic league appearances and goals as of 11:00, 11 November 2020 (UTC) ‡ National team caps and goals as of 11:00, 11 November 2020 (UTC)

Gary Smith (born 13 July 1966) is Saint Kitts and Nevis football manager and former player who was most recently the manager of National League side Tamworth. As a player, he spent most of his career playing as a forward.

== Playing career ==
Smith played for Paget Rangers, Sutton Coldfield Town and Worcester City.

=== Tamworth ===
In the summer of 1995, Smith signed for Southern Football League Midland Division side Tamworth. In his first season Smith scored 18 goals in just 37 matches. He remained at the club for a further five seasons, eventually leaving in 2001. making a total of 222 appearances and scoring 70 goals, which was a ratio of almost a goal every three matches.

=== Gresley Rovers ===
On 7 August 2002, John Newsome, manager of Southern League Division One West side Gresley Rovers signed Smith. He made his debut on 17 August 2002 against Evesham United, and went on to make 26 appearances for the club, finding the net on seven occasions, before leaving the club on 25 January 2003.

=== Evesham United ===
Following unsuccessful interest from Redditch United, it was confirmed that Smith had signed for rivals Evesham United on 16 February 2003.

== International career ==
=== Saint Kitts and Nevis ===
He became Tamworth's first international player after being capped for Saint Kitts and Nevis.

== Managerial career ==
=== Continental Star ===
Smith moved from assistant manager, to first team manager of Continental Star on 21 June 2014.

=== Tamworth ===
On 13 June 2018, Smith's return to The Lamb Ground was announced as the new joint manager of the club's under-21 side, working alongside Gareth Zimmerman. Following the dismissal of first team manager Dennis Greene on 20 January 2019, the following day Smith alongside Andrew Danylyszyn were put in charge as caretaker managers. The management duo's first game in charge was a 2–2 draw with Bedworth United.

On 8 March 2019, following a 5-game unbeaten run while in the caretaker role as managers, Smith and Danylyszyn were announced as joint managers for the club until the end of the season. Danylyszyn and Smith were announced manager of the month for March 2019 following 4 wins and a draw in their first 5 games in charge. Following much improved performances on the pitch, Smith and Danylyszyn steered the club away from relegation and secured a 12th position in their first season in the Southern League Premier Central. It was officially confirmed on 22 April 2019, that Smith and Danylyszyn had been appointed the club's permanent management duo, and would lead the club into the 2019–20 season.

== Personal life ==
Smith's cousin is former Stockport County, Birmingham City and Oxford United forward Kevin Francis.

Smith once appeared on the TV show Deal or No Deal, beating the banker, and dealing at £20,000.

== Career statistics ==
=== Managerial record ===
As of match played 11 November 2020

Managerial record by team and tenure
Team	From	To	Record					Ref.
Team	From	To	P	W	D	L	Win %	Ref.
Tamworth (joint manager with Andrew Danylyszyn)	21 January 2019	6 February 2022	52	33	8	11	63.46	
Total			52	33	8	11	63.46	

=== International ===
Appearances and goals by national team and year
National team	Year	Apps	Goals
Saint Kitts and Nevis	2000	4	2
Saint Kitts and Nevis	2001	3	0
Total		7	2

Scores and results list Saint Kitts and Nevis's goal tally first, score column indicates score after each Smith goal.

List of international goals scored by Gary Smith
No.	Date	Venue	Opponent	Score	Result	Competition
1	18 March 2000	Warner Park Sporting Complex, Basseterre, Saint Kitts and Nevis	Turks and Caicos Islands	8–0	8–0	2002 FIFA World Cup qualification
2	21 March 2002	Warner Park Sporting Complex, Basseterre, Saint Kitts and Nevis	Turks and Caicos Islands	6–0	6–0	2002 FIFA World Cup qualification
