= Wayne Dyer (footballer) =

Footballer (born 1977)

Personal information
- Date of birth: 24 November 1977 (age 48)
- Place of birth: Birmingham, England
- Height: 6 ft 2 in (1.88 m)
- Position: Midfielder

Youth career
- Birmingham City

Senior career*
Years	Team	Apps	(Gls)
1996–1997	Birmingham City	0	(0)
1997	Moor Green		
1997–1998	Oxford United	0	(0)
1998	→ Kingstonian (loan)	6	(1)
1998	Barry Town	0	(0)
1998	Walsall	1	(0)
1998	Nuneaton Borough	2	(0)
1998–1999	Hereford United	6	(1)
1999	Bedworth United		
1999	Chesham United		
1999	Kettering Town	2	(0)
1999–2000	Solihull Borough		
2000	Stourbridge		
2000	Stevenage Borough	4	(0)
2000–2002	Bedford Town	53	(7)
2002	Sutton Coldfield Town		
2002–2005	Hinckley United	88	(8)
2005–2007	Bromsgrove Rovers	76	(9)
2007–2008	Hednesford Town	23	(3)
2008–2009	Chasetown	7	(0)
2008	→ Coleshill Town (loan)	3	(0)
2009	Evesham United		
2010	Barwell	6	(1)
2010–2011	Redditch United	10	(0)
2011–	Romulus	0	(0)

International career
2000–2011	Montserrat	6	(1)
- * Club domestic league appearances and goals

Wayne Dyer (born 24 November 1977) is a former professional footballer who played as a midfielder. Born in England, he represented the Montserrat national team at international level.

Dyer notably scored Montserrat's first goal in FIFA World Cup qualification when he scored in the 88th minute of a 2002 FIFA World Cup qualification home leg against the Dominican Republic on 19 March 2000. The match was played in Port of Spain, Trinidad as the only pitch in Montserrat was unusable due to volcanic activity. Montserrat lost 3–1 and lost both games 6–1 on aggregate. In June 2011, after a gap of seven years he appeared again for his national team in a World Cup qualifying match against Belize.

In England, Dyer played for Birmingham City, Oxford United, Walsall, Stevenage Borough, and before Bromsgrove, Hinckley United, Stourbridge, Solihull Borough, Kettering Town and Chesham United.

== Career ==
Dyer joined Hednesford Town in October 2007 after two seasons at Bromsgrove Rovers, with the move to Keys Park covered in a recent edition of British football publication FourFourTwo magazine.

He moved to Chasetown but was loaned to Coleshill Town in October 2008 where he played three matches.

He then moved to Redditch United in the Conference North after moving from Barwell where he made 13 appearances in all, six in the league, scoring one goal—a diving header in the second minute of second half stoppage time to give Barwell a 2–1 victory over Grantham Town on 4 September 2010 after coming on a substitute.

Dyer made his first appearance for Redditch against Gainsborough Trinity on 6 November 2010. He went on to make ten appearances for Redditch, all in the league, with nine starts and one substitute appearance, before being released in February 2011.

In July 2011 he joined Romulus.

Dyer's younger brother Lloyd is also a professional footballer.

== Career statistics ==
Scores and results list Montserrat's goal tally first, score column indicates score after each Dyer goal.

List of international goals scored by Wayne Dyer
No.	Date	Venue	Opponent	Score	Result	Competition
1	19 March 2000	Hasely Crawford Stadium, Port of Spain, Trinidad and Tobago	Dominican Republic	1–3	1–3	2002 FIFA World Cup qualification
