= Jarvin Skeete =

Saint Lucian footballer

Personal information
- Date of birth: 8 March 1981 (age 45)
- Place of birth: Saint Lucia
- Position: Forward

Senior career*
| Years | Team | Apps | (Gls) |
| 2003–2006 | Arnett Gardens | | |
| 2006–2007 | New Vibes | | |
| 2009 | Portugal FC | 12 | (1) |

International career
| 2004 | Saint Lucia | 4 | (2) |
- * Club domestic league appearances and goals

Jarvin Skeete (born March 8, 1981) is a former Saint Lucian footballer who played for the Saint Lucia national football team, and played in the National Premier League, and the Canadian Soccer League.

== Playing career ==
Skeete began his professional career in the National Premier League in 2003 with Arnett Gardens F.C. In 2006, he signed with New Vibes of the St. Thomas League. In 2009, he signed with Portugal FC of the Canadian Soccer League. He made his debut for the club on May 22, 2009, in a match against the Serbian White Eagles FC. He recorded his first goal for the club on August 24, 2009, in a 1–0 victory over Toronto Croatia. He helped Portugal qualify for the postseason by finishing fourth in the International Division.

== International career ==
Skeete played for the Saint Lucia national football team appearing in four matches and scoring two goals. He would score two goals in the 2006 FIFA World Cup qualification – CONCACAF first round against the British Virgin Islands national football team.
