= Johnny Descolines =

Haitian footballer (born 1974)

Personal information
- Date of birth: 8 May 1974 (age 52)
- Place of birth: Port-au-Prince, Haiti
- Position: Striker

Youth career
- 1999: Violette AC

Senior career*
| Years | Team | Apps | (Gls) |
| 2000–2001 | Violette AC | 22 | (18) |
| 2002–2003 | Roulado | | |
| 2004–2005 | Isidro Metapán | | |
| 2007–2011 | Violette AC | 80 | (53) |

International career
| 1999–2005 | Haiti | 23 | (7) |
- * Club domestic league appearances and goals

Johnny Descolines (born 8 May 1974) is a Haitian former professional footballer who played as a striker.

== Club career ==
Descolines played for Violette and Roulado in the Haitian League before moving abroad to play for Salvadoran league side Isidro Metapán. He rejoined Violette in summer 2007.

== International career ==
Descolines made his Haiti national team debut in a May 1999 friendly match against Honduras and was a Haiti squad member at the 2000 and 2002 Gold Cup Finals. He played in three World Cup qualification matches in 2004 in which he also scored three goals.

== Coaching career ==
Descolines took up his first coaching position in April 2021, when he became part of the technical staff at L’Union Sportive Rivartibonitienne.

== Personal life ==
In October 2020 Descolines was kidnapped. He was released two days later.

== Career statistics ==
Scores and results list Haiti's goal tally first, score column indicates score after each Descolines goal.

List of international goals scored by Johnny Descolines
| No. | Date | Venue | Opponent | Score | Result | Competition |
|---|---|---|---|---|---|---|
| 1 | 6 October 1999 | Los Angeles Memorial Coliseum, Los Angeles, United States | El Salvador | 1–1 | 1–1 | 2000 CONCACAF Gold Cup qualification |
| 2 | 8 October 1999 | Los Angeles Memorial Coliseum, Los Angeles, United States | Cuba | 1–0 | 1–0 | 2000 CONCACAF Gold Cup qualification |
| 3 | 10 October 1999 | Los Angeles Memorial Coliseum, Los Angeles, United States | Canada | 1–2 | 1–2 | 2000 CONCACAF Gold Cup qualification |
| 4 | 18 February 2004 | Miami Orange Bowl, Miami, United States | Turks and Caicos Islands | 2–0 | 5–0 | 2006 FIFA World Cup qualification |
| 5 | 18 February 2004 | Miami Orange Bowl, Miami, United States | Turks and Caicos Islands | 3–0 | 5–0 | 2006 FIFA World Cup qualification |
| 6 | 18 February 2004 | Miami Orange Bowl, Miami, United States | Turks and Caicos Islands | 4–0 | 5–0 | 2006 FIFA World Cup qualification |
| 7 | 12 May 2004 | Robertson Stadium, Houston, United States | El Salvador | 2–0 | 3–3 | Friendly |
