= Lawrence Harvey (footballer) =

Turks and Caicos Islands footballer

Personal information
- Date of birth: 29 January 1973 (age 53)
- Place of birth: England
- Position: Defender

Senior career*
Years	Team	Apps	(Gls)
2004	Alcia Athletic		
2004–2008	KPMG United		

International career
2004	Turks & Caicos Islands	2	(0)
- * Club domestic league appearances and goals

Lawrence Harvey (born 29 January 1973) is an English-born former international footballer for the Turks and Caicos Islands national football team.

Harvey was eligible to play for Turks and Caicos Islands as FIFA eligibility rules permit British passport holders to represent British Overseas Territories at international football in FIFA-recognised matches following two years residency. He fulfills the criteria having once worked in TCI as a quantity surveyor.

== International career ==
He made two appearances for the Turks and Caicos Islands national football team in February 2004, both games were part of the 2006 FIFA World Cup qualification phase. The matches took place in Florida and were against Haiti, the matches ended with 5-0 and 2-0 victories in Haiti's favour. At the time of Harvey's call-up, he was playing in the Halls of Cambridge Sunday League for amateur team Alcia Athletic in England and working professionally as a quantity surveyor in Burwell near Cambridge.
