= Nigel Pierre =

Trinidad and Tobago footballer

Nigel Pierre (born 6 February 1979 in Saint Joseph) is a football striker from Trinidad and Tobago, who manages Westside Superstarz.

== Career ==
"Pistol" Pierre as he was once known due to his fearsome shooting ability had a 3-month loan spell at Bristol Rovers in England in the 1999–2000 season but, after impressing, the move was unable to go through due to work permit problems. Former San Juan Jabloteh boss Terry Fenwick again tried to take him to England to play for Northampton Town but once again Pierre was denied as he had only played 73% of Trinidad and Tobago's matches and not the required minimum of 75%. He played for Caledonia AIA, having been sacked from both his previous clubs.

== International career ==
He got 58 caps and scored 22 goals for the national team between 1999 and 2005.

== Clubs ==
- Queen's Park CC (1998)
- Joe Public (1999) (14 goals)
- Bristol Rovers (2000) 3 apps. (0 goals)
- Joe Public (2000–2002) (24 goals)
- San Juan Jabloteh (2002) 1 app. (0 goals)
- Joe Public (2002–2003) (4 goals)
- San Juan Jabloteh (2003–2005) (9 goals)
- Joe Public (2005) (2nd Div.)
- Caledonia AIA (2005–2006) (5 goals)
- Joe Public (2007–2008) (2 goals)
- WASA Clean & White (2008) (2nd Div.)
- United Petrotrin (2009) 5 apps. (0 goals)
- Queen's Park CC (2010–) (2nd Div.)

== International goals ==
Scores and results list Trinidad and Tobago's' goal tally first, score column indicates score after each Pierre goal.

List of international goals scored by Nigel Pierre
No.	Date	Venue	Opponent	Score	Result	Competition	Ref.
1	12 October 1999	Estadio Rommel Fernández, Panama City, Panama	Panama	1–1	2–2	Friendly	
2	16 April 2000	Estadio Panamericano, San Cristóbal, Dominican Republic	Dominican Republic	1–0	1–0	2002 FIFA World Cup qualification	
3	4 July 2000	Marvin Lee Stadium, Macoya, Trinidad and Tobago	Cuba	1–1	4–1	Friendly	
4	16 August 2000	Queen's Park Oval, Port of Spain, Trinidad and Tobago	Panama	6–0	6–0	2002 FIFA World Cup qualification	
5	15 November 2000	Queen's Park Oval, Port of Spain, Trinidad and Tobago	Panama	1–0	1–0	2002 FIFA World Cup qualification	
6	27 January 2001	National Cricket Stadium, St. George's, Grenada	Grenada	1–0	2–1	Friendly	
7	29 January 2001	National Cricket Stadium, St. George's, Grenada	Grenada	1–0	2–0	Friendly	
8	29 January 2001	National Cricket Stadium, St. George's, Grenada	Grenada	2–0	2–0	Friendly	
9	25 February 2001	Truman Bodden Sports Complex, George Town, Cayman Islands	Cayman Islands	1–0	3–0	Friendly	
10	24 March 2001	Hasely Crawford Stadium, Port of Spain, Trinidad and Tobago	Guatemala	2–1	3–1	Friendly	
11	24 March 2001	Hasely Crawford Stadium, Port of Spain, Trinidad and Tobago	Guatemala	3–1	3–1	Friendly	
12	10 May 2001	Marvin Lee Stadium, Macoya, Trinidad and Tobago	Grenada	1–?	5–3	Friendly	
13	23 June 2001	Bermuda National Stadium, Devonshire Parish, Bermuda	Bermuda	2–0	5–0	Friendly	
14	26 November 2004	Manny Ramjohn Stadium, San Fernando, Trinidad and Tobago	Grenada	1–0	2–0	2005 Caribbean Cup	
15	12 December 2004	A. O. Shirley Recreation Ground, Road Town, British Virgin Islands	British Virgin Islands	1–0	4–0	2005 Caribbean Cup	
16	12 December 2004	A. O. Shirley Recreation Ground, Road Town, British Virgin Islands	British Virgin Islands	2–0	4–0	2005 Caribbean Cup	
17	19 December 2004	Marvin Lee Stadium, Macoya, Trinidad and Tobago	British Virgin Islands	1–0	2–0	2005 Caribbean Cup	
18	9 January 2005	Manny Ramjohn Stadium, San Fernando, Trinidad and Tobago	Saint Vincent and the Grenadines	3–1	3–1	2005 Caribbean Cup	
19	12 January 2005	Antigua Recreation Ground, St. John's, Antigua and Barbuda	Antigua and Barbuda	1–1	1–2	Friendly	
20	23 January 2005	Manny Ramjohn Stadium, San Fernando, Trinidad and Tobago	Azerbaijan	1–0	2–0	Friendly	
21	20 February 2005	Barbados National Stadium, Saint Michael, Barbados	Jamaica	1–2	1–2	2005 Caribbean Cup	
