= Vladimir Edouard =

Canadian–Haitian footballer (born 1978)

Personal information
- Date of birth: 18 June 1978 (age 48)
- Place of birth: Outaouais, Quebec, Canada
- Height: 1.82 m (6 ft 0 in)
- Position: Forward

Senior career*
Years	Team	Apps	(Gls)
1998–2000	Montreal Impact	21	(1)
2001	Ottawa Wizards	3	(1)
2002–2003	Montreal/Laval Dynamites	21	(5)
2005	Vermont Voltage	5	(1)
2006	Laval Dynamites	9	(7)

International career
2000	Haiti	6	(3)
- * Club domestic league appearances and goals

Vladimir Edouard (born 18 June 1978) is a Canadian-born Haitian former footballer who played as a forward. He also played at the international level with the Haiti national team.

== Playing career ==
=== Youth career ===
Edouard spent a portion of his youth in Haiti where he played at the youth level. In 1994, he returned to Quebec where he played in the local regional circuit the Ligue de soccer élite du Québec with Outaouais Football Club. After training in Poland with ŁKS Łódź academy he was offered a contract in 1997. He was also offered an athletic scholarship with Mercer University but declined the offer to pursue opportunities in Europe. He represented Team Quebec at the Canada Games as well as the 1997 Jeux de la Francophonie. In the Canada Summer Games, he featured in the tournament's final against Team British Columbia and contributed a goal to secure the gold medal for Quebec.

=== Montreal Impact ===
He entered the professional ranks in 1998 by signing a contract with Montreal Impact in the A-League. He recorded his first goal for Montreal on May 11, 1998, against Atlanta Ruckus. In his debut season with Montreal, he assisted the club in securing the Can-Am Cup where he recorded a goal against Rochester Raging Rhinos. He helped Montreal secure a postseason berth by finishing second in their division. He would appear in 10 matches and record one goal in his debut season.

The following season Montreal was inactive due to financial restructuring and returned for the 2000 outdoor season. He re-signed with Montreal for the 2000 season. In his second season with the Impact, he featured in a friendly soccer tournament named La Coupe de Montreal that included the Guatemala and Haiti national teams. He played in the opening match against Haiti where Montreal won the game. He also recorded a goal in the tournament against RS Settat.

In 2001, he was released from his contract with Montreal.

=== Later career ===
In 2001, he signed with the expansion franchise Ottawa Wizards of the Canadian Professional Soccer League. In his debut season with Ottawa, he assisted the club in securing a double (regular-season title & league cup) and also clinched a playoff berth. Ottawa would be eliminated in the preliminary round of the playoffs by St. Catharines Roma Wolves.

After a brief stint in Ottawa, he signed with league rivals Montreal Dynamites the following season. He made his debut for Montreal on June 9, 2002, against the York Region Shooters where he scored two goals in a 3-0 victory. In the 2003 season, the club moved to the suburb of Laval, Quebec, resulting in a slight name change and Edouard re-signed with the team. After two seasons with the Dynamites, he played abroad in the USL Premier Development League with Vermont Voltage of the USL Premier Development League. In his debut season in Vermont, he appeared in five matches and scored one goal.

In 2006, he returned to his former club Laval Dynamites for the 2006 CSL season.

== International career ==
In 1999, he was called to the Canada men's national soccer team camp by head coach Holger Osieck.

Edouard would ultimately play for the Haiti national football team in 2000 and made his debut on March 11, 2000, against Dominica in a 2002 FIFA World Cup qualification match. He recorded his first international goal on April 1, 2000, against the Bahamas. He would add another pair of goals by scoring two against the Bahamas in another World Cup qualifier match. Before the commencement of the second round of the CONCACAF World Cup qualifier matches, he played against Miami Fusion in a friendly match. He played against Trinidad and Tobago in the final round of the Caribbean Zone World Cup qualification.
