= Thomas Elliott =

Thomas or Tom Elliott may refer to:

- Thomas Elliott (footballer) (1890–1955), English footballer
- Thomas Elliott (Australian cricketer) (1879–1939), Australian cricketer
- Thomas Elliott (New Zealand cricketer) (1867–?), New Zealand cricketer
- C. Thomas Elliott (born 1939), British scientist, known as Tom Elliott
- Thomas Elliott (RAF officer) (1898–?), World War I British flying ace
- Thomas Renton Elliott (1877–1961), British physician and physiologist
- Sir Thomas Elliott, 1st Baronet, English civil servant
- Tom Elliott, Baron Elliott of Ballinamallard (born 1963), Northern Irish politician
- Tom Elliott (footballer, born 1990), English footballer
- Tom Elliott (Australian footballer) (1901–1974), former Australian rules footballer
- Tom Elliott (radio personality) (born 1967), Australian radio presenter and former investment banker
- Thomas Jane (born 1969), actor born Thomas Elliott III

== See also ==
- Thomas Eliot (disambiguation)
