= Gabriel Michel =

Haitian footballer (born 1973)

Personal information
- Date of birth: 12 October 1973 (age 53)
- Position: Midfielder

Senior career*
Years	Team	Apps	(Gls)
1990–2012	Don Bosco		

International career
1996–2003	Haiti	21	(3)
- * Club domestic league appearances and goals

Gabriel Michel (born 12 October 1973) is a Haitian former professional footballer who played as a midfielder for Don Bosco FC. He was capped 21 times for Haiti, and all of his 3 goals came in the same 2002 FIFA World Cup qualification game against Bahamas.
