= Marlon Felter =

Surinamese footballer (born 1978)

Personal information
- Date of birth: 21 July 1978 (age 48)
- Position: Defender

Senior career*
Years	Team	Apps	(Gls)
2002–2003	Inter Moengotapoe		
2003–2008	FCS Nacional		
2008–2012	WBC		

International career
2004–2011	Suriname	48	(5)
- * Club domestic league appearances and goals

Marlon Felter (born 21 July 1978) is a Surinamese former professional footballer who played as a defender. He is the most capped player of all time for the Suriname national team, with 48 caps.

== Career ==
Felter played club football for Inter Moengotapoe, FCS Nacional, and WBC.

He earned 44 caps for Suriname between 2004 and 2011, which included 19 appearances in FIFA World Cup qualifying matches.
