= Quentin Clarke =

Antigua and Barbudan footballer

Personal information
- Date of birth: April 8, 1969 (age 57)
- Position: Midfielder

Team information
- Current team: English Harbour FC

International career
Years	Team	Apps	(Gls)
1992–2008	Antigua and Barbuda		(3)

Quentin Clarke (born April 8, 1969) is an Antigua and Barbudan football player. He has played for Antigua and Barbuda national team.

== National team statistics ==
Antigua and Barbuda national team
Year	Apps	Goals
1992		
1993		
1994		
1995		
1996		
1997		
1998		
1999		
2000	6	0
2001	0	0
2002	0	0
2003	0	0
2004	2	1
2005	0	0
2006	0	0
2007	0	0
2008	3	0
Total		

=== International goals ===
Scores and results list Antigua and Barbuda's goal tally first.

Goal	Date	Venue	Opponent	Score	Result	Competition
1.	19 April 1992	Ergilio Hato Stadium, Willemstad, Netherlands Antilles	Netherlands Antilles	1–0	1–1	1994 FIFA World Cup qualification
2.	10 March 1996	Windsor Park, Roseau, Dominica	Dominica	1–1	3–3	1998 FIFA World Cup qualification
3.	18 February 2004	Antigua Recreation Ground, St. John's, Antigua and Barbuda	Netherlands Antilles	2–0	2–0	2006 FIFA World Cup qualification
