= Lester Moré =

Cuban footballer

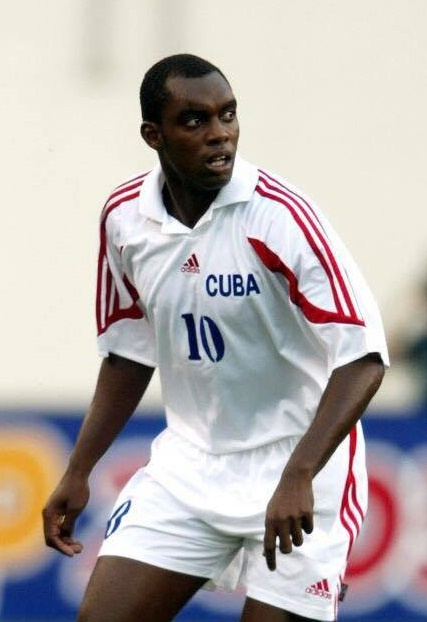
- Moré in 2003

Personal information
- Full name: Lester Oriel Moré Henningham
- Date of birth: 15 July 1978 (age 48)
- Place of birth: Ciego de Avila, Cuba
- Height: 1.80 m (5 ft 11 in)
- Position: Forward

Senior career*
Years	Team	Apps	(Gls)
1996–2007	Ciego de Ávila	47+	(123)
2007	FC Villa Clara		(6)
2008	Charleston Battery	11	(0)
2009	River Plate Ponce	13	(8)
2010	LA Azul Legends	1	(0)
Total		72	(137)

International career
1996–2007	Cuba	60	(30)
- * Club domestic league appearances and goals

Lester Oriel Moré Henningham (born 15 July 1978) is a Cuban former professional footballer who played as a forward. He is the Cuba national team's all-time top scorer, with 30 goals.

== Club career ==
Moré played for over a decade for his hometown team, Ciego de Ávila, in his native Cuba, prior to his defection to the United States in 2008. He won the Campeonato Nacional de Fútbol de Cuba with Ciego de Ávila in 2001 and 2003. He scored a Cuban league record of 32 goals in the 2002–03 season and 123 league goals in total.

He played with Charleston Battery in 2008, featuring in eleven games before being released at the end of the season. He played for Club Atlético River Plate Puerto Rico in 2009, before moving back to the United States to play for the amateur Los Angeles Azul Legends in the USL Premier Development League in 2010, alongside former Cuba national teammate Eders Roldan.

== International career ==
Moré made his debut for Cuba in 1995 and was a squad member at the 1998, 2003, 2005 and 2007 Gold Cup Finals.

Moré also played in 17 FIFA World Cup qualification matches between 1996 and 2004. He collected a total of 60 caps and scored 30 goals, making him the top scorer of the national team.

== Defection to the United States ==
Moré's final appearance for the national team was at the CONCACAF Gold Cup in June 2007 against Mexico. During the tournament, he and Osvaldo Alonso fled the Cuban team camp, effectively defecting from Cuba.

== Career statistics ==
=== International ===
Scores and results list Cuba's goal tally first, score column indicates score after each Moré goal.

List of international goals scored by Lester Moré
No.	Date	Venue	Opponent	Score	Result	Competition
1	14 May 1996	Truman Bodden Sports Complex, George Town, Cayman Islands	Cayman Islands	5–0	5–0	1998 FIFA World Cup qualification
2	23 June 1996	Hasely Crawford Stadium, Port of Spain, Trinidad and Tobago	Haiti	6–0	6–1	1998 FIFA World Cup qualification
3	15 December 1996	Estadio Rommel Fernández, Panama City, Panama	Panama	1–3	1–3	1998 FIFA World Cup qualification
4	7 May 2000	Estadio Pedro Marrero, Havana, Cuba	Barbados	1–1	1–1	2002 FIFA World Cup qualification
5	21 May 2000	Barbados National Stadium, Bridgetown, Barbados	Barbados	1–1	1–1	2002 FIFA World Cup qualification
6	27 November 2002	Truman Bodden Sports Complex, George Town, Cayman Islands	Cayman Islands	2–0	5–0	2003 CONCACAF Gold Cup qualification
7	27 November 2002	Truman Bodden Sports Complex, George Town, Cayman Islands	Cayman Islands	3–0	5–0	2003 CONCACAF Gold Cup qualification
8	29 November 2002	Truman Bodden Sports Complex, George Town, Cayman Islands	Martinique	1–0	2–1	2003 CONCACAF Gold Cup qualification
9	26 March 2003	Marvin Lee Stadium, Macoya, Trinidad and Tobago	Antigua and Barbuda	1–0	2–0	2003 CONCACAF Gold Cup qualification
10	26 March 2003	Marvin Lee Stadium, Macoya, Trinidad and Tobago	Antigua and Barbuda	2–0	2–0	2003 CONCACAF Gold Cup qualification
11	30 March 2003	Manny Ramjohn Stadium, Marabella, Trinidad and Tobago	Trinidad and Tobago	2–1	3–1	2003 CONCACAF Gold Cup qualification
12	14 July 2003	Gillette Stadium, Foxborough, United States	Canada	1–0	2–0	2003 CONCACAF Gold Cup
13	14 July 2003	Gillette Stadium, Foxborough, United States	Canada	2–0	2–0	2003 CONCACAF Gold Cup
14	22 February 2004	Truman Bodden Sports Complex, George Town, Cayman Islands	Cayman Islands	1–0	2–1	2006 FIFA World Cup qualification
15	16 March 2004	Estadio Pedro Marrero, Havana, Cuba	Panama	1–1	1–1	Friendly
16	18 March 2004	Estadio Pedro Marrero, Havana, Cuba	Panama	3–0	3–0	Friendly
17	27 March 2004	Estadio Pedro Marrero, Havana, Cuba	Cayman Islands	1–0	3–0	2006 FIFA World Cup qualification
18	27 March 2004	Estadio Pedro Marrero, Havana, Cuba	Cayman Islands	2–0	3–0	2006 FIFA World Cup qualification
19	27 March 2004	Estadio Pedro Marrero, Havana, Cuba	Cayman Islands	3–0	3–0	2006 FIFA World Cup qualification
20	12 June 2004	Estadio Pedro Marrero, Havana, Cuba	Costa Rica	1–1	2–2	2006 FIFA World Cup qualification
21	12 June 2004	Estadio Pedro Marrero, Havana, Cuba	Costa Rica	2–2	2–2	2006 FIFA World Cup qualification
22	21 December 2004	Stade Pierre-Aliker, Fort-de-France, Martinique	Martinique	2–0	2–0	2005 Caribbean Cup
23	20 February 2005	Barbados National Stadium, Bridgetown, Barbados	Barbados	1–0	3–0	2005 Caribbean Cup
24	20 February 2005	Barbados National Stadium, Bridgetown, Barbados	Barbados	2–0	3–0	2005 Caribbean Cup
25	22 February 2005	Barbados National Stadium, Bridgetown, Barbados	Trinidad and Tobago	1–1	2–1	2005 Caribbean Cup
26	22 February 2005	Barbados National Stadium, Bridgetown, Barbados	Trinidad and Tobago	2–1	2–1	2005 Caribbean Cup
27	7 July 2005	Qwest Field, Seattle, United States	United States	1–0	1–4	2005 CONCACAF Gold Cup
28	8 November 2006	Stade Pierre-Aliker, Fort-de-France, Martinique	Haiti	2–0	2–1	2007 Caribbean Cup
29	16 January 2007	Manny Ramjohn Stadium, Marabella, Trinidad and Tobago	Saint Vincent and the Grenadines	1–0	3–0	2007 Caribbean Cup
30	16 January 2007	Manny Ramjohn Stadium, Marabella, Trinidad and Tobago	Saint Vincent and the Grenadines	2–0	3–0	2007 Caribbean Cup
