= Kellon Baptiste =

Grenadian footballer

Personal information
- Date of birth: 7 September 1973
- Date of death: 12 April 2012 (aged 38)
- Position: Goalkeeper

Senior career*
Years	Team	Apps	(Gls)
- GBSS
2004–2005	St. Louis Steamers		

International career
1991–2004	Grenada		
- * Club domestic league appearances and goals

Kellon Baptiste (7 September 1973 – 12 April 2012) was a Grenadian international footballer who played as a goalkeeper.

== Career ==
Baptiste played club football in Grenada for GBSS Demerara Mutual, and he also had a spell with the St. Louis Steamers in the United States.

Baptiste made his international debut in 1991, and appeared in eight FIFA World Cup qualifying matches.

He died of cancer in Saint George, Grenada.
