= Nigel Bishop =

Grenadian football player

Personal information
- Date of birth: 23 December 1976 (age 49)
- Place of birth: Saint George, Grenada.
- Position: Forward

Senior career*
Years	Team	Apps	(Gls)
2001-2019	GBSS		(15)

International career
	Grenada	19	(5)
- * Club domestic league appearances and goals

Nigel Bishop (born December 23, 1976, in St. George's, Grenada) is a Grenadian former football player. He served as striker for the Grenada national football team.

== Career statistics ==
=== International ===
Appearances and goals by national team and year
National team	Year	Apps	Goals
Grenada	2001	3	1
Grenada	2002	1	0
Grenada	2004	12	4
Grenada	2008	2	0
Grenada	2010	1	0
Total		19	5

Scores and results list Grenada's goal tally first, score column indicates score after each Bishop goal.

List of international goals scored by Nigel Bishop
No.	Date	Venue	Opponent	Score	Result	Competition	Ref.
1	16 March 2001	St. George's, Grenada	Saint Vincent and the Grenadines	1–1	1–1	Friendly	
2	28 February 2004	National Cricket Stadium, St. George's, Grenada	Guyana	1–0	5–0	2006 FIFA World Cup qualification	
3	20 May 2005	Estadio Pedro Marrero, Havana, Cuba	Cuba	2–2	2–2	Friendly	
4	13 November 2004	Arnos Vale Stadium, Arnos Vale, Saint Vincent and the Grenadines	Saint Vincent and the Grenadines	2–5	2–6	Friendly	
5	24 November 2004	Marvin Lee Stadium, Macoya, Trinidad and Tobago	Suriname	2–1	2–2	2005 Caribbean Cup qualification	
