= Roosevelt Désir =

Haitian footballer (born 1974)

Personal information
- Date of birth: 4 April 1974 (age 52)
- Position: Defender

Senior career*
Years	Team	Apps	(Gls)
1996–2006	FICA		
2007–2015	AS Capoise		

International career
1996–2006	Haiti	40	(0)
- * Club domestic league appearances and goals

Roosevelt Désir (born 4 April 1974) is a Haitian former professional footballer who played as a defender.
