= Thomas Elliot (footballer) =

Caymanian footballer

Personal information
- Full name: Thomas Elliot
- Date of birth: 18 June 1979 (age 47)
- Place of birth: Cayman Islands
- Position: Defender

Team information
- Current team: Sunset

Senior career*
Years	Team	Apps	(Gls)
2004–2016	Sunset		
2016–2017	Scholars International		
2017–	Sunset		

International career^{‡}
2002–	Cayman Islands	13	(1)
- * Club domestic league appearances and goals ‡ National team caps and goals as of 12 July 2020

Thomas Elliot (born 18 June 1979) is a Caymanian footballer who plays as a defender. He has represented the Cayman Islands during World Cup qualifying matches in 2004 and 2008.

== Career statistics ==
As of match played 19 November 2019.

National team	Year	Apps	Goals
Cayman Islands	2002	3	0
Cayman Islands	2003	0	0
Cayman Islands	2004	4	1
Cayman Islands	2005	0	0
Cayman Islands	2006	0	0
Cayman Islands	2007	0	0
Cayman Islands	2008	5	0
Cayman Islands	2009	0	0
Cayman Islands	2010	0	0
Cayman Islands	2011	0	0
Cayman Islands	2012	0	0
Cayman Islands	2013	0	0
Cayman Islands	2014	0	0
Cayman Islands	2015	0	0
Cayman Islands	2016	0	0
Cayman Islands	2017	0	0
Cayman Islands	2018	0	0
Cayman Islands	2019	1	0
Total		13	1

=== International goals ===
Scores and results list the Cayman Islands' goal tally first.

No.	Date	Venue	Opponent	Score	Result	Competition
1.	22 February 2004	Truman Bodden Stadium, George Town, Cayman Islands	Cuba	1–1	1–2	2006 FIFA World Cup qualification
