= Mark Mackay (footballer) =

Aruban footballer (born 1978)

Personal information
- Date of birth: September 25, 1978 (age 48)
- Place of birth: Oranjestad, Aruba
- Position: Midfielder

Senior career*
Years	Team	Apps	(Gls)
2004–2005	RCA	?	(?)
2005–2008	Transvaal	?	(?)
2008–2007	Britannia	?	(?)

International career
2000–2004	Aruba	5	(2)
- * Club domestic league appearances and goals

Mark Mackay (born September 25, 1978) is an Aruban football player. He has played for the Aruba national team.

== National team statistics ==
Aruba national team
Year	Apps	Goals
2000	4	2
2002	1	0
2004	0	0
Total	6	2
