= Avondale Williams =

British Virgin Islands footballer and manager (born 1977)

Personal information
- Full name: Prince Avondale Williams
- Date of birth: 10 October 1977 (age 49)
- Place of birth: British Virgin Islands
- Position: Striker

Senior career*
Years	Team	Apps	(Gls)
1997–2002	Veterans		
2003–2004	Rangers		
2004	Veterans		
2005–2007	Rangers		
2008–2017	Islanders FC		

International career
1995	Saint Vincent and the Grenadines	1	(0)
2000–2012	British Virgin Islands	15	(5)

Managerial career
- 2008–2018: British Virgin Islands
- * Club domestic league appearances and goals

Avondale Williams (born 10 October 1977) is a British Virgin Islander football manager and former player. He played as a forward for Veterans, Rangers, and Islanders FC. He is the British Virgin Islands national team's all-time leading scorer with five goals.

== International career ==
=== Saint Vincent and the Grenadines ===
On 30 July 1995, Williams made his international debut for Saint Vincent and the Grenadines against Trinidad and Tobago, scoring an own goal in a 5–0 loss.

=== British Virgin Islands ===
Williams later switched his allegiance to the British Virgin Islands, making his debut on 5 March 2000 and scoring the Nature Boyz' lone goal in a 5–1 loss to Bermuda. He went on to earn fifteen caps for the British Virgin Islands, scoring a record five goals, including a brace against the Bahamas.

== Managerial career ==
Williams was the manager of the British Virgin Islands national football team from 2008 to 2018.

In 2012, he made a return to his national team by substituting himself on in the 41st minute in a 2012 Caribbean Cup match against Martinique.

== Career statistics ==
=== International ===
As of match played 5 September 2012

Scores and results list British Virgin Islands' goal tally first, score column indicates score after each Williams goal.

List of international goals scored by Avondale Williams
No.	Date	Venue	Cap	Opponent	Score	Result	Competition
1.	5 March 2000	A. O. Shirley Recreation Ground, Road Town, British Virgin Islands	1	Bermuda	1–4	1–5	2002 FIFA World Cup qualification
2.	4 April 2001	Stade Pierre-Aliker, Fort-de-France, Martinique	3	Cayman Islands	2–1	2–2	2001 Caribbean Cup qualification
3.	30 January 2004	A. O. Shirley Recreation Ground, Road Town, British Virgin Islands	5	U.S. Virgin Islands	2–0	5–0	Friendly
4.	30 March 2008	Roscow A. L. Davies Soccer Field, Nassau, Bahamas	14	Bahamas	1–2	2–2	2010 FIFA World Cup qualification
5.	30 March 2008	Roscow A. L. Davies Soccer Field, Nassau, Bahamas	14	Bahamas	2–2	2–2	2010 FIFA World Cup qualification

== See also ==
- List of top international men's football goalscorers by country
