= Stanton Lewis (footballer, born 1974) =

Bermudian footballer

Personal information
- Date of birth: 9 March 1974 (age 52)
- Position: Defender

Senior career*
Years	Team	Apps	(Gls)
2001–2006	PHC Zebras		
2006–2011	Boulevard Blazers		

International career
1999–2006	Bermuda	21	(1)

Managerial career
- 2012: Warwick Academy
- * Club domestic league appearances and goals

Stanton Lewis (born 9 March 1974) is a Bermudian retired international footballer.

== Club career ==
A left-sided defender, Lewis has played club football for PHC Zebras and Boulevard Blazers.

== International career ==
He earned a total of 21 caps for Bermuda, scoring 1 goal.

His final international match was a November 2006 CONCACAF Gold Cup qualification match against Barbados.

=== International goals ===
Scores and results list Bermuda's goal tally first.

N.	Date	Venue	Opponent	Score	Result	Competition	Ref
1.	19 March 2000	National Stadium, Hamilton, Bermuda	British Virgin Islands	5–0	9–0	2002 FIFA World Cup qualification	

== Managerial career ==
In 2012, he was Head Coach of Warwick Academy.
