= Roody Lormera =

Haitian footballer (born 1982)

Personal information
- Date of birth: 22 December 1982 (age 43)
- Place of birth: Haiti
- Position: Striker

Team information
- Current team: Puntarenas
- Number: 7

Senior career*
| Years | Team | Apps | (Gls) |
| 2001–2003 | Roulado | | |
| 2003–2004 | Club El Porvenir | 8 | (0) |
| 2004–2006 | Universidad | | |
| 2006–2007 | Hispano | | |
| 2007–present | Puntarenas | 1 | (0) |

International career^{‡}
| 2002– | Haiti | 19 | (7) |
- * Club domestic league appearances and goals as of March 20, 2008 ‡ National team caps and goals as of 12 February 2008

Roody Lormera (born December 22, 1982) is a Haitian football player, who plays as a striker.

== Club career ==
Lormera started his career at Haitian club Roulado before moving abroad to play for clubs in Argentina, Honduras, Costa Rica and USA

== International career ==
He made his debut for Haiti in a November 2002 Gold Cup qualifying match against Antigua and Barbuda, in which he immediately scored a goal. He scored another goal in his second game against the Netherlands Antilles four days later. He played in 3 World Cup qualification matches in 2004 in which he also scored a goal.
