= Barbados National Stadium =

Multi-use outdoor stadium in Barbados

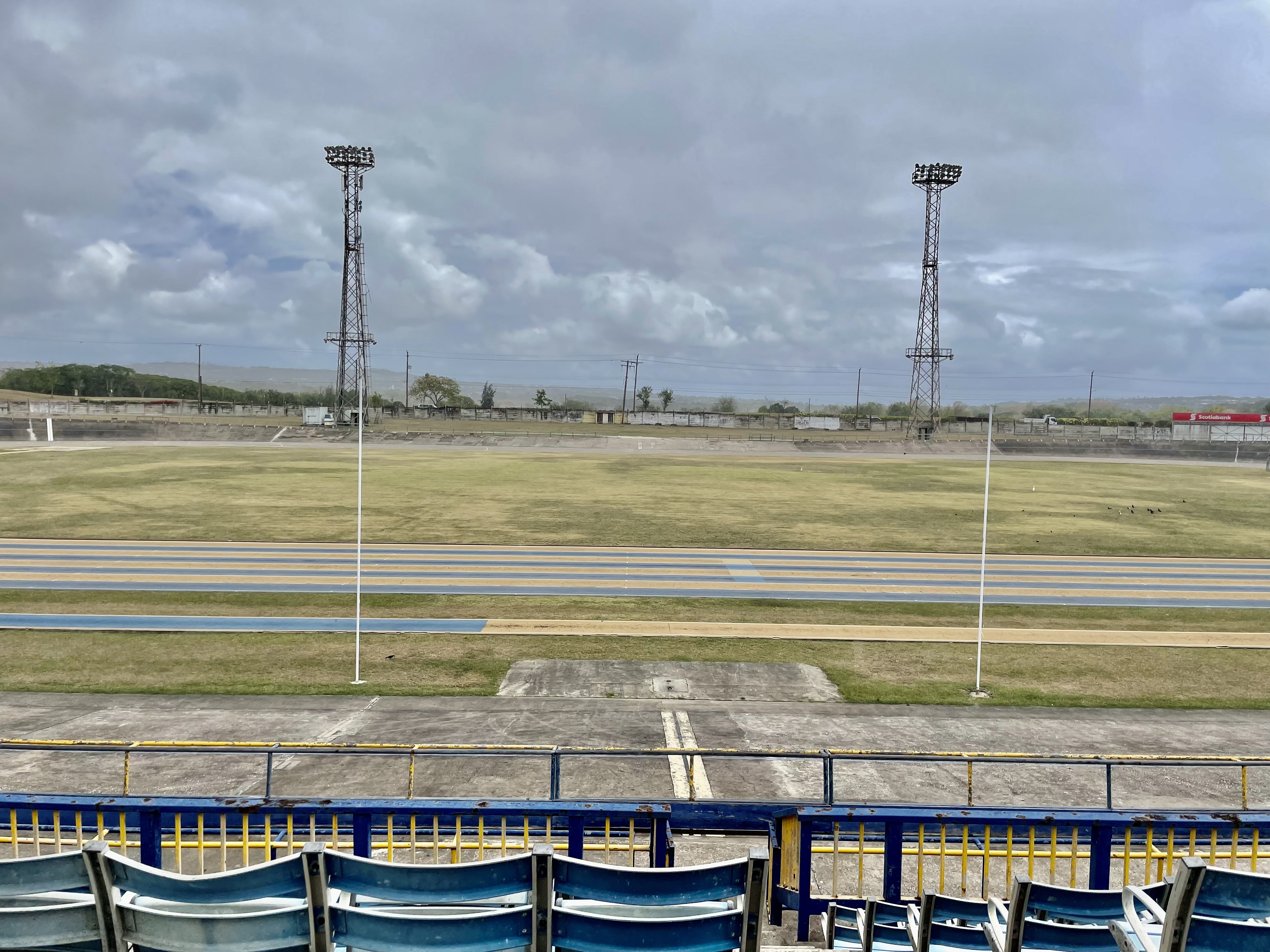
- Barbados National Stadium
- Interactive map of Barbados National Stadium
- Location: Waterford, St. Michael, Barbados
- Coordinates: 13.120°N 59.605°W
- Owner: Government of Barbados
- Operator: National Sports Council (1 Feb 1978–present); National Stadium Corporation (5 May 1966–31 Jan 1978)
- Capacity: 10,000 (planned) Former capacity List: 5,000 (1970–2024)
- Surface: Track and field

Construction
- Built: 1968–1970
- Opened: 1970
- Renovated: 2024–present
- Expanded: 2024–present

Tenants
- Notre Dame SC; Barbados national football team

Barbados National Stadium is a multi-use outdoor stadium in Waterford, St. Michael, Barbados. Occupying a 22-acre site, it was officially opened on 23 October 1970 by Prince Charles. Situated approximately 4.3 km northeast of the capital city Bridgetown, it is located on Highway 2 at Stadium Road, Codrington, St. Michael The Stadium is currently used mostly for football matches and is the home of the Barbados national football team.

The stands are named after renowned Barbadian athletes: the Clarence Jemmott "A" Stand, the O'Donnell "Don" Norville "B" Stand, the VIP Stand, the James "Jim" Wedderburn "C" Stand, the Patricia "Patsy" Callender "D" Stand and also there is the Randolph Fields Velodrome and the Christie Smith Gate, the Reginal Haynes Gate, and the Jaycees Gate at the north side of the Stadium.

In 2006, FIFA condemned the stadium as unfit for purpose, as little improvement or repair had been made to it since it had opened in 1970. There were plans to demolish the existing stands and rebuild the ground before Barbados' 2010 World Cup qualification campaign began. In 2011 the Barbadian government estimated the cost to re-engineer the stadiums' running track at 2 million dollars. However, no date was determined as to when the funding could be sourced or the works could be carried out. In 2010 the stadium started hosting the Joseph Payne Memorial Classic, a competitive event among Barbadian secondary school students. The National Stadium's five stands were closed to the public in April 2015 because of rusty pieces of debris which had fallen from the steel supports which held the roofs. From December 2018 to January 2019, the roofs on all the five stands were removed and plans were made to demolish and rebuild the whole stadium. It will soon be constructed into a brand new stadium with new improved stands, car parks and new LED stadium lights as soon as possible.

== See also ==
- List of national stadiums
- List of stadiums by capacity
