= Saint Kitts and Nevis national football team results =

This page details the match results and statistics of the Saint Kitts and Nevis national football team.

== Key ==
Key to matches

- Att.=Match attendance
- (H)=Home ground
- (A)=Away ground
- (N)=Neutral ground

Key to record by opponent

- Pld=Games played
- W=Games won
- D=Games drawn
- L=Games lost
- GF=Goals for
- GA=Goals against

== Results ==
Saint Kitts and Nevis' score is shown first in each case.

No.	Date	Venue	Opponents	Score	Competition	Saint Kitts and Nevis scorers	Att.	Ref.
1	18 August 1938	Basseterre (H)	Grenada	2–4	Friendly	Unknown	—	
2	11 October 1972	Warner Park, Basseterre (H)	Trinidad and Tobago	0–3	Friendly		—	
3	3 June 1979	National Stadium, Kingston (A)	Jamaica	1–2	1979 CFU Championship qualification	Tyson	—	
4	17 June 1979	Warner Park, Basseterre (H)	Jamaica	1–2	1979 CFU Championship qualification	Unknown	—	
5	25 May 1983	Stade d'Honneur de Dillon, Fort-de-France (A)	Martinique	0–7	1983 CFU Championship qualification		—	
6	5 June 1983	Warner Park, Basseterre (H)	Martinique	0–5	1983 CFU Championship qualification		—	
7	24 November 1985	Warner Park, Basseterre (H)	Dominica	2–1	OECS Tournament	Unknown	—	
8	1 December 1985	Dominica (A)	Dominica	1–0	OECS Tournament	Unknown	—	
9	23 April 1989	Warner Park, Basseterre (H)	French Guiana	1–0	1989 Caribbean Cup qualification	Thompson	—	
10	7 May 1989	Grenada (A)	Grenada	1–2	1989 Caribbean Cup qualification	Unknown	—	
11	21 May 1989	Warner Park, Basseterre (H)	Trinidad and Tobago	0–2	1989 Caribbean Cup qualification		—	
12	18 June 1989	Oranjestad (A)	Aruba	4–1	1989 Caribbean Cup qualification	Unknown	—	
13	24 March 1990	Warner Park, Basseterre (H)	Antigua and Barbuda	3–1	Friendly	Unknown	—	
14	29 April 1990	National Stadium, Kingston (A)	Jamaica	0–3	1990 Caribbean Cup qualification		10,000	
15	19 May 1990	Warner Park, Basseterre (H)	Guadeloupe	2–0	1990 Caribbean Cup qualification	Unknown	—	
16	3 June 1990	Warner Park, Basseterre (H)	Saint Martin	1–0	1990 Caribbean Cup qualification	Unknown	—	
17	12 May 1991	Warner Park, Basseterre (N)	Cayman Islands	1–1	1991 Caribbean Cup qualification	Unknown	—	
18	14 May 1991	Warner Park, Basseterre (N)	British Virgin Islands	0–0	1991 Caribbean Cup qualification		—	
19	15 April 1992	Warner Park, Basseterre (N)	British Virgin Islands	4–0	1992 Caribbean Cup qualification	Unknown	—	
20	17 April 1992	Warner Park, Basseterre (N)	Montserrat	10–0	1992 Caribbean Cup qualification	Unknown	—	
21	18 April 1992	Warner Park, Basseterre (N)	Antigua and Barbuda	0–1	1992 Caribbean Cup qualification		—	
22	2 April 1993	Warner Park, Basseterre (N)	British Virgin Islands	5–1	1993 Caribbean Cup qualification	Huggins, Sargeant (2), Allers-Kelly, Gumbs	—	
23	6 April 1993	Warner Park, Basseterre (N)	Dominican Republic	2–2	1993 Caribbean Cup qualification	Unknown	—	
24	21 May 1993	National Stadium, Kingston (N)	Jamaica	1–4	1993 Caribbean Cup	Unknown	—	
25	23 May 1993	National Stadium, Kingston (N)	Puerto Rico	1–0	1993 Caribbean Cup	Unknown	—	
26	25 May 1993	National Stadium, Kingston (N)	Sint Maarten	2–2	1993 Caribbean Cup	Unknown	—	
27	28 May 1993	National Stadium, Kingston (N)	Martinique	1–1 (a.e.t.) (3–4p)	1993 Caribbean Cup	Huggins	12,569	
28	30 May 1993	National Stadium, Kingston (N)	Trinidad and Tobago	2–3	1993 Caribbean Cup	Riley, Huggins	25,467	
29	14 November 1993	Antigua Recreation Ground, St. John's (A)	Antigua and Barbuda	0–3	Friendly		—	
30	23 February 1994	Warner Park, Basseterre (N)	Montserrat	9–1	1994 Caribbean Cup qualification	Unknown	—	
31	25 February 1994	Warner Park, Basseterre (N)	Dominica	2–3 (a.s.d.e.t.)	1994 Caribbean Cup qualification	Unknown	—	
32	12 March 1995	Barbados National Stadium, Saint Michael (A)	Barbados	1–0	Friendly	Unknown	—	
33	19 March 1995	Raoul Illidge Sports Complex, Philipsburg (A)	Sint Maarten	2–0	1995 Caribbean Cup qualification	Gumbs, L. Francis	—	
34	26 March 1995	Warner Park, Basseterre (H)	Sint Maarten	0–1	1995 Caribbean Cup qualification		—	
35	30 April 1995	Warner Park, Basseterre (H)	Antigua and Barbuda	1–1	1995 Caribbean Cup qualification	Huggins	—	
36	21 May 1995	Yasco Sports Complex, St. John's (A)	Antigua and Barbuda	2–2 (a.e.t.) (3–4p)	1995 Caribbean Cup qualification	Gumbs, Kelly	—	
37	6 December 1995	Warner Park, Basseterre (H)	Jamaica	0–3	Friendly		—	
38	27 March 1996	Warner Park, Basseterre (N)	Anguilla	8–0	1996 Caribbean Cup qualification	Unknown	—	
39	31 March 1996	Warner Park, Basseterre (N)	Sint Maarten	3–0	1996 Caribbean Cup qualification	Unknown	—	
40	5 May 1996	Warner Park, Basseterre (H)	Saint Lucia	5–1	1998 FIFA World Cup qualification	Allers-Kelly (2), Sargeant (2), Gumbs	1,500	
41	19 May 1996	Mindoo Phillip Park, Castries (A)	Saint Lucia	1–0	1998 FIFA World Cup qualification	Allers-Kelly	500	
42	26 May 1996	Industry Park, Palo Seco (N)	Jamaica	1–4	1996 Caribbean Cup	Gumbs	4,000	
43	28 May 1996	Hasely Crawford Stadium, Port of Spain (N)	Trinidad and Tobago	1–5	1996 Caribbean Cup	Bedford	7,000	
44	30 May 1996	Hasely Crawford Stadium, Port of Spain (N)	Suriname	1–1	1996 Caribbean Cup	Riley	2,000	
45	23 June 1996	Warner Park, Basseterre (H)	Saint Vincent and the Grenadines	2–2	1998 FIFA World Cup qualification	Gumbs, Bedford	3,000	
46	30 June 1996	Arnos Vale Stadium, Kingstown (A)	Saint Vincent and the Grenadines	0–0	1998 FIFA World Cup qualification		2,500	
47	6 July 1997	Warner Park, Basseterre (N)	Martinique	2–0	1997 Caribbean Cup	Unknown	—	
48	8 July 1997	Warner Park, Basseterre (N)	Trinidad and Tobago	0–3	1997 Caribbean Cup		4,600	
49	10 July 1997	Warner Park, Basseterre (N)	Grenada	2–1 (a.e.t.)	1997 Caribbean Cup	Gumbs (2)	4,500	
50	13 July 1997	Antigua Recreation Ground, St. John's (N)	Trinidad and Tobago	0–4	1997 Caribbean Cup		7,500	
51	4 October 1997	Warner Park, Basseterre (H)	Cuba	0–2	1998 CONCACAF Gold Cup qualification play-off		—	
52	29 October 1997	Warner Park, Basseterre (H)	Jamaica	1–1	Friendly	L. Francis	5,000	
53	1 March 1998	Barbados National Stadium, Saint Michael (A)	Barbados	2–6	Friendly	Unknown	—	
54	3 March 1998	Mindoo Phillip Park, Castries (A)	Saint Lucia	0–2	Friendly		—	
55	5 March 1998	Arnos Vale Stadium, Kingstown (A)	Saint Vincent and the Grenadines	2–4	Friendly	Unknown	—	
56	1 April 1998	Warner Park, Basseterre (N)	British Virgin Islands	4–0	1998 Caribbean Cup qualification	Gumbs, Farrell (o.g.), Jeffers, Huggins	—	
57	3 April 1998	Warner Park, Basseterre (N)	Dominica	1–2	1998 Caribbean Cup qualification	Huggins	—	
58	5 April 1998	Warner Park, Basseterre (N)	Guadeloupe	2–1	1998 Caribbean Cup qualification	Unknown	—	
59	28 May 1998	Warner Park, Basseterre (H)	Trinidad and Tobago	4–1	St. Kitts Festival	Unknown	—	
60	17 April 1999	Arnos Vale Stadium, Kingstown (N)	Saint Vincent and the Grenadines	4–3	1999 Caribbean Cup qualification	Unknown	—	
61	18 April 1999	Arnos Vale Stadium, Kingstown (N)	Martinique	1–2	1999 Caribbean Cup qualification	Unknown	—	
62	20 April 1999	Arnos Vale Stadium, Kingstown (N)	Saint Lucia	4–3	1999 Caribbean Cup qualification	Unknown	—	
63	29 May 1999	Warner Park, Basseterre (H)	Antigua and Barbuda	4–1	Friendly	Unknown	—	
64	6 June 1999	Dr. João Havelange Centre of Excellence, Macoya (N)	Haiti	0–2	1999 Caribbean Cup		200	
65	8 June 1999	Dr. João Havelange Centre of Excellence, Macoya (N)	Cuba	0–2	1999 Caribbean Cup		—	
66	2 February 2000	Warner Park, Basseterre (H)	Saint Lucia	0–1	Friendly		—	
67	17 February 2000	Barbados National Stadium, Saint Michael (A)	Barbados	0–1	Friendly		—	
68	18 March 2000	Warner Park, Basseterre (H)	Turks and Caicos Islands	8–0	2002 FIFA World Cup qualification	Saddler (3), G. Isaac, L. Francis, Crawford, Gumbs, Smith	853	
69	21 March 2000	Warner Park, Basseterre (A)	Turks and Caicos Islands	6–0	2002 FIFA World Cup qualification	Huggins (2), Gumbs, G. Isaac, L. Francis, Smith	1,000	
70	16 April 2000	Arnos Vale Stadium, Kingstown (A)	Saint Vincent and the Grenadines	0–1	2002 FIFA World Cup qualification		5,800	
71	22 April 2000	Warner Park, Basseterre (H)	Saint Vincent and the Grenadines	1–2	2002 FIFA World Cup qualification	Gumbs	3,500	
72	19 February 2001	Warner Park, Basseterre (H)	Saint Lucia	2–0	Friendly	Unknown	—	
73	1 March 2001	Antigua Recreation Ground, St. John's (N)	Dominican Republic	2–1	2001 Caribbean Cup qualification	Gumbs (2)	—	
74	4 March 2001	Antigua Recreation Ground, St. John's (N)	Antigua and Barbuda	2–2	2001 Caribbean Cup qualification	Mills, Gumbs	—	
75	5 May 2001	Warner Park, Basseterre (H)	Puerto Rico	2–0	Friendly	Unknown	—	
76	6 May 2001	Warner Park, Basseterre (H)	Puerto Rico	4–1	Friendly	Unknown	—	
77	16 May 2001	Dr. João Havelange Centre of Excellence, Macoya (N)	Haiti	2–7	2001 Caribbean Cup	Saddler, Gumbs	200	
78	18 May 2001	Dr. João Havelange Centre of Excellence, Macoya (N)	Cuba	1–1	2001 Caribbean Cup	Huggins	200	
79	20 May 2001	Larry Gomes Stadium, Malabar (N)	Suriname	4–0	2001 Caribbean Cup	Cannonier, Huggins, Gumbs, Doynin	250	
80	28 July 2001	Warner Park, Basseterre (H)	Martinique	4–2	St. Kitts Festival	Unknown	—	
81	30 July 2001	Warner Park, Basseterre (H)	Jamaica	0–0	St. Kitts Festival		—	
82	19 January 2002	Warner Park, Basseterre (H)	Grenada	1–1	Friendly	Sargeant	—	
83	25 July 2002	Warner Park, Basseterre (H)	Chinese Taipei	3–0	St. Kitts Festival	Own goal, J. Francis, Sargeant	—	
84	27 July 2002	Warner Park, Basseterre (H)	Barbados	3–0	St. Kitts Festival	G. Isaac, J. Francis, Gumbs	—	
85	28 July 2002	Warner Park, Basseterre (H)	Trinidad and Tobago	2–1	St. Kitts Festival	Sargeant, G. Isaac	800	
86	27 October 2002	Antigua Recreation Ground, St. John's (A)	Antigua and Barbuda	1–1	Friendly	Unknown	—	
87	3 November 2002	Stade d'Honneur de Dillon, Fort-de-France (A)	Martinique	1–2	Friendly	Unknown	—	
88	13 November 2002	Dr. João Havelange Centre of Excellence, Macoya (N)	Saint Lucia	2–1	2003 CONCACAF Gold Cup qualification	G. Isaac (2)	—	
89	15 November 2002	Hasely Crawford Stadium, Port of Spain (N)	Trinidad and Tobago	0–2	2003 CONCACAF Gold Cup qualification		1,500	
90	29 July 2003	Warner Park, Basseterre (H)	Haiti	1–0	St. Kitts Festival	G. Isaac	—	
91	2 August 2003	Warner Park, Basseterre (H)	Trinidad and Tobago	1–2	St. Kitts Festival	J. Francis	—	
92	31 January 2004	Antigua Recreation Ground, St. John's (A)	Antigua and Barbuda	0–1	Friendly		—	
93	18 February 2004	Lionel Roberts Park, Charlotte Amalie (A)	U.S. Virgin Islands	4–0	2006 FIFA World Cup qualification	Higgins, I. Lake (2), G. Isaac	225	
94	20 March 2004	Warner Park, Basseterre (H)	British Virgin Islands	4–0	Friendly	Unknown	—	
95	21 March 2004	Warner Park, Basseterre (H)	Antigua and Barbuda	2–3	Friendly	J. Francis, G. Isaac	—	
96	31 March 2004	Warner Park, Basseterre (H)	U.S. Virgin Islands	7–0	2006 FIFA World Cup qualification	I. Lake (5), G. Isaac (2)	800	
97	23 May 2004	Warner Park, Basseterre (H)	Saint Vincent and the Grenadines	3–2	Friendly	I. Lake, Hodge, Willock	—	
98	2 June 2004	Warner Park, Basseterre (H)	Northern Ireland	0–2	Friendly		2,000	
99	13 June 2004	Barbados National Stadium, Saint Michael (A)	Barbados	2–0	2006 FIFA World Cup qualification	Gumbs, Newton	3,700	
100	19 June 2004	Warner Park, Basseterre (H)	Barbados	3–2	2006 FIFA World Cup qualification	Gomez, Willock (2)	3,500	
101	4 September 2004	Warner Park, Basseterre (H)	Trinidad and Tobago	1–2	2006 FIFA World Cup qualification	G. Isaac	2,800	
102	10 September 2004	Arnos Vale Stadium, Kingstown (A)	Saint Vincent and the Grenadines	0–1	2006 FIFA World Cup qualification		4,000	
103	10 October 2004	Manny Ramjohn Stadium, San Fernando (A)	Trinidad and Tobago	1–5	2006 FIFA World Cup qualification	Gumbs	7,000	
104	13 October 2004	Warner Park, Basseterre (H)	Saint Vincent and the Grenadines	0–3	2006 FIFA World Cup qualification		500	
105	31 October 2004	Warner Park, Basseterre (N)	Montserrat	6–1	2005 Caribbean Cup qualification	J. Francis (3), Cannonier, G. Isaac, Hodge	—	
106	2 November 2004	Warner Park, Basseterre (N)	Saint Lucia	1–1	2005 Caribbean Cup qualification	J. Francis	—	
107	4 November 2004	Warner Park, Basseterre (N)	Antigua and Barbuda	2–0	2005 Caribbean Cup qualification	Sargeant, G. Isaac	—	
108	13 November 2004	Miami Orange Bowl, Miami (H)	Mexico	0–5	2006 FIFA World Cup qualification		18,312	
109	17 November 2004	Estadio Tecnológico, Monterrey (A)	Mexico	0–8	2006 FIFA World Cup qualification		12,000	
110	12 December 2004	Lockhart Stadium, Fort Lauderdale (A)	Haiti	0–1	2005 Caribbean Cup qualification		2,500	
111	15 December 2004	Warner Park, Basseterre (H)	Haiti	0–2	2005 Caribbean Cup qualification		1,000	
112	25 February 2006	Warner Park, Basseterre (H)	Saint Martin	6–1	Friendly	J. Francis (2), Saddler, Cannonier (2), Archibald	—	
113	20 September 2006	Antigua Recreation Ground, St. John's (N)	Barbados	1–1	2007 Caribbean Cup qualification	Harris	300	
114	22 September 2006	Antigua Recreation Ground, St. John's (N)	Anguilla	6–1	2007 Caribbean Cup qualification	G. Isaac (2), I. Lake (3), J. Francis	500	
115	24 September 2006	Antigua Recreation Ground, St. John's (N)	Antigua and Barbuda	0–1	2007 Caribbean Cup qualification		3,800	
116	18 November 2007	Warner Park, Basseterre (H)	Antigua and Barbuda	3–0	Friendly	J. Francis, Christian (o.g.), Nurse	—	
117	1 December 2007	Antigua Recreation Ground, St. John's (A)	Antigua and Barbuda	0–2	Friendly		—	
118	14 December 2007	Bermuda National Stadium, Devonshire Parish (A)	Bermuda	2–1	Friendly	J. Francis, I. Lake	—	
119	16 December 2007	Bermuda National Stadium, Devonshire Parish (A)	Bermuda	2–4	Friendly	Ponteen, Charles	15,000	
120	6 February 2008	Estadio Mateo Flores, Guatemala City (A)	Belize	1–3	2010 FIFA World Cup qualification	Williams	500	
121	26 March 2008	Warner Park, Basseterre (H)	Belize	1–1	2010 FIFA World Cup qualification	O. Mitchum	2,000	
122	8 June 2008	Antigua Recreation Ground, St. John's (A)	Antigua and Barbuda	0–2	Friendly		—	
123	24 September 2008	Warner Park, Basseterre (N)	British Virgin Islands	4–0	2008 Caribbean Cup qualification	J. Francis, Archibald, Venton (o.g.), J. Lake	500	
124	28 September 2008	Warner Park, Basseterre (N)	Barbados	1–3	2008 Caribbean Cup qualification	G. Isaac	500	
125	5 November 2008	Marvin Lee Stadium, Macoya (N)	Guyana	1–1	2008 Caribbean Cup qualification	I. Lake	750	
126	7 November 2008	Marvin Lee Stadium, Macoya (N)	Trinidad and Tobago	1–3	2008 Caribbean Cup qualification	J. Francis	—	
127	9 November 2008	Marvin Lee Stadium, Macoya (N)	Antigua and Barbuda	3–4	2008 Caribbean Cup qualification	J. Francis (3)	1,000	
128	12 July 2009	Warner Park, Basseterre (H)	Trinidad and Tobago	2–3	Friendly	I. Lake, Williams	—	
129	16 August 2009	Warner Park, Basseterre (H)	Jamaica	0–1	Friendly		5,000	
130	5 September 2009	Arnos Vale Stadium, Kingstown (A)	Saint Vincent and the Grenadines	3–0	Friendly	Clarke, Tishan Hanley, Saddler	—	
131	20 September 2009	Warner Park, Basseterre (H)	Saint Vincent and the Grenadines	1–1	Friendly	S. Isaac	—	
132	2 March 2010	Stade Municipal de Vieux-Habitants, Vieux-Habitants (A)	Guadeloupe	1–2	Friendly	G. Isaac	—	
133	3 April 2010	Warner Park, Basseterre (H)	Guadeloupe	3–0	Friendly	Harris, I. Lake, G. Isaac	1,000	
134	28 August 2010	Warner Park, Basseterre (H)	Antigua and Barbuda	1–1	Friendly	J. Francis	—	
135	6 October 2010	Victoria Park, Kingstown (N)	Barbados	1–1	2010 Caribbean Cup qualification	G. Isaac	250	
136	8 October 2010	Victoria Park, Kingstown (N)	Saint Vincent and the Grenadines	1–1	2010 Caribbean Cup qualification	J. Francis	1,600	
137	10 October 2010	Victoria Park, Kingstown (N)	Montserrat	4–0	2010 Caribbean Cup qualification	Saddler (2), Gumbs, I. Lake	1,100	
138	22 October 2010	Grenada National Stadium, St. George's (N)	Guadeloupe	1–2	2010 Caribbean Cup qualification	J. Francis	300	
139	24 October 2010	Grenada National Stadium, St. George's (N)	Grenada	0–2	2010 Caribbean Cup qualification		500	
140	26 October 2010	Grenada National Stadium, St. George's (N)	Puerto Rico	1–0	2010 Caribbean Cup qualification	J. Francis	500	
141	27 March 2011	Warner Park, Basseterre (H)	Grenada	0–0	Friendly		1,000	
142	2 April 2011	Grenada National Stadium, St. George's (A)	Grenada	1–0	Friendly	Saddler	3,500	
143	2 September 2011	Warner Park, Basseterre (H)	Puerto Rico	0–0	2014 FIFA World Cup qualification		2,500	
144	6 September 2011	Beausejour Cricket Ground, Gros Islet (A)	Saint Lucia	4–2	2014 FIFA World Cup qualification	I. Lake, J. Francis, O. Mitchum, Elliott	2,005	
145	7 October 2011	Juan Ramón Loubriel Stadium, Bayamón (A)	Puerto Rico	1–1	2014 FIFA World Cup qualification	I. Lake	2,500	
146	11 October 2011	Warner Park, Basseterre (H)	Saint Lucia	1–1	2014 FIFA World Cup qualification	I. Lake	1,000	
147	11 November 2011	Warner Park, Basseterre (H)	Canada	0–0	2014 FIFA World Cup qualification		4,000	
148	15 November 2011	BMO Field, Toronto (A)	Canada	0–4	2014 FIFA World Cup qualification		10,235	
149	3 March 2012	Warner Park, Basseterre (H)	Antigua and Barbuda	1–0	Friendly	Tiran Hanley	—	
150	10 October 2012	Warner Park, Basseterre (N)	Anguilla	2–0	2012 Caribbean Cup qualification	Sawyers, Harris	700	
151	12 October 2012	Warner Park, Basseterre (N)	Trinidad and Tobago	0–1	2012 Caribbean Cup qualification		1,700	
152	14 October 2012	Warner Park, Basseterre (N)	French Guiana	0–3	2012 Caribbean Cup qualification		200	
153	3 September 2014	Warner Park, Basseterre (N)	Saint Lucia	0–0	2014 Caribbean Cup qualification		—	
154	5 September 2014	Warner Park, Basseterre (N)	Dominica	5–0	2014 Caribbean Cup qualification	Lawrence (o.g.), Sawyers, Harris, Thomas, J. Leader	—	
155	7 September 2014	Warner Park, Basseterre (N)	Guyana	2–0	2014 Caribbean Cup qualification	Thomas, Harris	—	
156	8 October 2014	Stade Sylvio Cator, Port-au-Prince (N)	Barbados	2–3	2014 Caribbean Cup qualification	Elliott, Panayiotou	—	
157	10 October 2014	Stade Sylvio Cator, Port-au-Prince (N)	French Guiana	2–1	2014 Caribbean Cup qualification	O. Mitchum, Tishan Hanley	—	
158	12 October 2014	Stade Sylvio Cator, Port-au-Prince (N)	Haiti	0–0	2014 Caribbean Cup qualification		—	
159	23 March 2015	Warner Park, Basseterre (H)	Turks and Caicos Islands	6–2	2018 FIFA World Cup qualification	Harris, T. Leader, O. Mitchum (2), Tishan Hanley, O'Loughlin	2,000	
160	26 March 2015	TCIFA National Academy, Providenciales (A)	Turks and Caicos Islands	6–2	2018 FIFA World Cup qualification	J. Leader (2), Panayiotou (3), Robbins	420	
161	10 May 2015	Usain Bolt Sports Complex, Cave Hill (A)	Barbados	3–1	Friendly	Isles, Elliott, Rogers	—	
162	11 June 2015	Warner Park, Basseterre (H)	El Salvador	2–2	2018 FIFA World Cup qualification	O. Mitchum, Sawyers	3,100	
163	16 June 2015	Estadio Cuscatlán, San Salvador (A)	El Salvador	1–4	2018 FIFA World Cup qualification	Harris	9,830	
164	12 November 2015	Estadi Comunal d'Andorra la Vella, Andorra la Vella (A)	Andorra	1–0	Friendly	Elliott	—	
165	17 November 2015	Lilleküla Stadium, Tallinn (A)	Estonia	0–3	Friendly		1,902	
166	21 February 2016	Warner Park, Basseterre (H)	Bermuda	3–0	Friendly	Blanchette, Rogers, Bertie	—	
167	26 March 2016	Trinidad Stadium, Oranjestad (A)	Aruba	2–0	2017 Caribbean Cup qualification	Panayiotou, Sawyers	—	
168	29 March 2016	Warner Park, Basseterre (H)	Antigua and Barbuda	1–0	2017 Caribbean Cup qualification	Panayiotou	—	
169	1 June 2016	Warner Park, Basseterre (H)	Suriname	1–0	2017 Caribbean Cup qualification	Panayiotou	—	
170	7 June 2016	Arnos Vale Stadium, Kingstown (A)	Saint Vincent and the Grenadines	1–0	2017 Caribbean Cup qualification	Blanchette	—	
171	31 August 2016	Dennis Martínez National Stadium, Managua (A)	Nicaragua	0–0	Friendly		—	
172	8 October 2016	Stade Municipal Dr. Edmard Lama, Remire-Montjoly (A)	French Guiana	0–1	2017 Caribbean Cup qualification		—	
173	13 November 2016	Warner Park, Basseterre (H)	Haiti	0–2 (a.e.t.)	2017 Caribbean Cup qualification		—	
174	19 November 2016	Warner Park, Basseterre (H)	Estonia	1–1	Friendly	Elliott	1,124	
175	6 May 2017	Warner Park, Basseterre (H)	Barbados	2–1	Friendly	Blanchette, Bertie	—	
176	4 June 2017	Vazgen Sargsyan Republican Stadium, Yerevan (A)	Armenia	0–5	Friendly		—	
177	7 June 2017	Mikheil Meskhi Stadium, Tbilisi (A)	Georgia	0–3	Friendly		—	
178	22 August 2017	Mumbai Football Arena, Mumbai (N)	Mauritius	1–1	2017 Hero Tri-Nation Series	Rogers	—	
179	24 August 2017	Mumbai Football Arena, Mumbai (A)	India	1–1	2017 Hero Tri-Nation Series	Amory	—	
180	2 December 2017	Warner Park, Basseterre (H)	Grenada	1–0	Friendly	Martin	—	
181	25 March 2018	Estadio Cibao, Santiago de los Caballeros (A)	Dominican Republic	1–2	Friendly	Y. Mitchum	—	
182	26 April 2018	Warner Park, Basseterre (H)	Jamaica	1–3	Friendly	Isles	—	
183	9 September 2018	Warner Park, Basseterre (H)	Puerto Rico	1–0	CONCACAF Nations League qualifying	Panayiotou	—	
184	14 October 2018	Raymond E. Guishard Technical Centre, The Valley (A)	Saint Martin	10–0	CONCACAF Nations League qualifying	Harris (3), Noubon (o.g.), Panayiotou (2), Wharton (2), Sterling-James, Rogers	—	
185	18 November 2018	Warner Park, Basseterre (H)	Canada	0–1	CONCACAF Nations League qualifying		—	
186	23 March 2019	André Kamperveen Stadion, Paramaribo (A)	Suriname	0–2	CONCACAF Nations League qualifying		—	
187	25 August 2019	Warner Park, Basseterre (H)	Antigua and Barbuda	3–0	Friendly	Unknown	—	
188	27 August 2019	Warner Park, Basseterre (H)	Antigua and Barbuda	4–3	Friendly	Unknown	—	
189	5 September 2019	Kirani James Athletic Stadium, St. George's (A)	Grenada	1–2	2019–20 CONCACAF Nations League	Tahir Hanley	—	
190	8 September 2019	Warner Park, Basseterre (H)	French Guiana	2–2	2019–20 CONCACAF Nations League	Wharton, Liburd	—	
191	10 October 2019	Isidoro Beaton Stadium, Belmopan (A)	Belize	4–0	2019–20 CONCACAF Nations League	Sterling-James, Liburd (3)	—	
192	13 October 2019	Warner Park, Basseterre (H)	Belize	0–1	2019–20 CONCACAF Nations League		—	
193	14 November 2019	Warner Park, Basseterre (H)	Grenada	0–0	2019–20 CONCACAF Nations League		—	
194	17 November 2019	Stade Municipal Dr. Edmard Lama, Remire-Montjoly (A)	French Guiana	1–3	2019–20 CONCACAF Nations League	Terrell	—	
195	24 March 2021	Estadio Panamericano, San Cristóbal (H)	Puerto Rico	1–0	2022 FIFA World Cup qualification	Nelson	—	
196	27 March 2021	Thomas Robinson Stadium, Nassau (A)	Bahamas	4–0	2022 FIFA World Cup qualification	Freeman (2), Rogers, Sterling-James	—	
197	4 June 2021	Warner Park, Basseterre (H)	Guyana	3–0	2022 FIFA World Cup qualification	Freeman (2), Sawyers	0	
198	8 June 2021	Félix Sánchez Olympic Stadium, Santo Domingo (A)	Trinidad and Tobago	0–2	2022 FIFA World Cup qualification		0	
199	12 June 2021	Warner Park, Basseterre (H)	El Salvador	0–4	2022 FIFA World Cup qualification		0	
200	15 June 2021	Estadio Cuscatlán, San Salvador (A)	El Salvador	0–2	2022 FIFA World Cup qualification		0	
201	25 March 2022	Estadi Nacional, Andorra la Vella (A)	Andorra	0–1	Friendly		—	
202	9 June 2022	Stadion Rignaal Jean Francisca, Willemstad (N)	Aruba	3–2	2022–23 CONCACAF Nations League	Bertie, Sterling-James, Nelson	—	
203	12 June 2022	Warner Park, Basseterre (H)	Saint Martin	1–1	2022–23 CONCACAF Nations League	Clarke	—	
204	23 March 2023	Raymond E. Guishard Stadium, The Valley (A)	Saint Martin	3–1	2022–23 CONCACAF Nations League	T. Williams, Sawyers, Panayiotou		
205	26 March 2023	Warner Park, Basseterre (H)	Aruba	2–1	2022–23 CONCACAF Nations League	Remy, President		
206	16 June 2023	DRV PNK Stadium, Fort Lauderdale (N)	Curaçao	1–1	2023 CONCACAF Gold Cup qualification	Terrell		
207	20 June 2023	DRV PNK Stadium, Fort Lauderdale (N)	French Guiana	1–1	2023 CONCACAF Gold Cup qualification	T. Williams		
208	25 June 2023	DRV PNK Stadium, Fort Lauderdale (N)	Trinidad and Tobago	0–3	2023 CONCACAF Gold Cup			
209	28 June 2023	CityPark, St. Louis (N)	United States	0–6	2023 CONCACAF Gold Cup			
210	2 July 2023	Levi's Stadium, Santa Clara (N)	Jamaica	0–5	2023 CONCACAF Gold Cup			

Notes

1. Note 1: This list does not include results from the Leeward Islands Tournament where Saint Kitts and Nevis competed separately.
2. A: Due to the lack of a regulation pitch, the Turks and Caicos Islands played their home match during qualifying for the 2002 FIFA World Cup in Basseterre, Saint Kitts and Nevis.
3. B: Saint Kitts and Nevis played their home match against Mexico during qualifying for the 2006 FIFA World Cup in Miami, Florida, United States.
4. C: Haiti played their home match against Saint Kitts and Nevis during qualifying for the 2005 Caribbean Cup in Fort Lauderdale, Florida, United States.
5. D: Belize played their home match against Saint Kitts and Nevis during qualifying for the 2010 FIFA World Cup in Guatemala City, Guatemala.
6. E: Saint Martin played their home matches during qualifying for the 2019–20 CONCACAF Nations League in The Valley, Anguilla.
7. F: Due to travel and quarantine restrictions caused by the COVID-19 pandemic in North America, Saint Kitts and Nevis played their home match against Puerto Rico in San Cristóbal, Dominican Republic.
8. G: Match held behind closed doors due to the COVID-19 pandemic in North America.
9. H: Due to travel and quarantine restrictions caused by the COVID-19 pandemic in North America, Trinidad and Tobago played their home match against Saint Kitts and Nevis in Santo Domingo, Dominican Republic.
10. I: Saint Martin played their home matches during the 2022–23 CONCACAF Nations League in The Valley, Anguilla.

== Record by opponent ==
Team	Pld	W	D	L	GF	GA	GD	WPCT
Andorra	2	1	0	1	1	1	0	50.00
Anguilla	4	4	0	0	20	3	+17	100.00
Antigua and Barbuda	21	8	5	8	33	29	+4	38.10
Armenia	1	0	0	1	0	5	−5	0.00
Aruba	4	4	0	0	11	4	+7	100.00
Bahamas	2	2	0	0	5	0	+5	100.00
Barbados	12	6	2	4	21	19	+2	50.00
Belize	5	1	1	3	8	11	−3	20.00
Bermuda	3	2	0	1	7	5	+2	66.67
Bonaire	1	1	0	0	2	1	+1	100.00
British Virgin Islands	8	7	1	0	26	2	+24	87.50
Canada	3	0	1	2	0	5	−5	0.00
Cayman Islands	3	1	2	0	6	3	+3	33.33
Chinese Taipei	1	1	0	0	3	0	+3	100.00
Cuba	7	1	3	3	8	15	−7	14.29
Dominica	5	3	0	2	11	6	+5	60.00
Dominican Republic	3	1	1	1	5	5	0	33.33
El Salvador	4	0	1	3	3	12	−9	0.00
Estonia	2	0	1	1	1	4	−3	0.00
French Guiana	6	2	1	3	6	10	−4	33.33
Georgia	1	0	0	1	0	3	−3	0.00
Grenada	13	4	3	6	16	18	−2	30.77
Guadeloupe	5	3	0	2	9	5	+4	60.00
Guyana	3	2	1	0	6	1	+5	66.67
Haiti	7	1	1	5	3	14	−11	14.29
India	1	0	1	0	1	1	0	0.00
Indonesia	1	0	0	1	0	4	−4	0.00
Jamaica	10	0	2	8	6	23	−17	0.00
Mauritius	1	0	1	0	1	1	0	0.00
Martinique	7	2	1	4	9	19	−10	28.57
Mexico	2	0	0	2	0	13	−13	0.00
Montserrat	4	4	0	0	29	2	+27	100.00
Nicaragua	1	0	1	0	0	0	0	0.00
Northern Ireland	1	0	0	1	0	2	−2	0.00
Puerto Rico	8	6	2	0	11	2	+9	75.00
Saint Lucia	11	6	3	2	19	11	+8	54.55
Saint Martin	7	6	1	0	25	5	+20	85.71
Saint Vincent and the Grenadines	15	4	4	7	19	26	−7	26.67
Sint Maarten	6	2	2	2	8	7	+1	33.33
Solomon Islands	1	1	0	0	4	2	+2	100.00
Suriname	4	2	1	1	6	3	+3	50.00
Trinidad and Tobago	17	2	0	15	17	48	−31	11.76
Turks and Caicos Islands	4	4	0	0	26	4	+22	100.00
U.S. Virgin Islands	2	2	0	0	11	0	+11	100.00
Total	229	96	43	90	403	354	+49	41.92

Updated to match(es) played on 30 March 2026. Source: Results
