= 1999 Caribbean Cup =

Copa Caribe 1999

Tournament details
- Host country: Trinidad and Tobago
- Teams: 27 (from 2 confederations)

Final positions
- Champions: Trinidad and Tobago (7th title)
- Runners-up: Cuba

Tournament statistics
- Top scorer(s): (Cuba) Ariel Álvarez (5 goals)
- Best player(s): (Cuba) Raciel Martinez

The Caribbean Cup, established in 1989, was the championship tournament for national association football teams that are members of the Caribbean Football Union.

== Entrants ==
- Antigua and Barbuda
- Bahamas
- Barbados
- Bermuda
- Brazil U-20 (Invitee)
- British Virgin Islands
- Cayman Islands
- Cuba
- Dominica
- Dominican Republic
- French Guiana (Later withdrew)
- Grenada
- Guadeloupe
- Guyana
- Haiti
- Jamaica (Defending Champions)
- Martinique
- Montserrat
- Netherlands Antilles
- Puerto Rico
- Saint Lucia
- Saint Kitts and Nevis
- Saint Vincent and the Grenadines
- Suriname
- Trinidad and Tobago (Hosts)
- Turks and Caicos Islands
- U.S. Virgin Islands

=== Withdraws ===
- Anguilla
- Aruba
- Saint Martin
- Sint Maarten

== Qualifying tournament ==
=== Preliminary round ===
==== Group A ====
Team	Pld	W	D	L	GF	GA	GD	Pts
Bahamas	2	1	1	0	3	0	+3	4
U.S. Virgin Islands	2	0	2	0	2	2	0	2
Turks and Caicos Islands	2	0	1	1	2	5	−3	1

24 February 1999

Bahamas	3–0	Turks and Caicos Islands

Bahamas

26 February 1999

U.S. Virgin Islands	2–2	Turks and Caicos Islands
		Bryan

Bahamas

28 February 1999

Bahamas	0–0	U.S. Virgin Islands

Bahamas

==== Group B ====
28 February 1999

Guyana	2–2	Barbados

Guyana
6 March 1999

Barbados	2–0	Guyana

Barbados

==== Group C ====
3 February 1999

Martinique	3–1	French Guiana

Martinique
14 February 1999

French Guiana	n / p	Martinique

French Guiana

French Guiana withdrew

==== Group D ====
Anguilla withdrew, leaving British Virgin Islands and Montserrat to compete.

5 February 1999

British Virgin Islands	3–1	Montserrat
		Webb

British Virgin Islands
7 February 1999

British Virgin Islands	3–0	Montserrat

British Virgin Islands

==== Group E ====
Aruba and Sint Maarten both withdrew.

=== Qualifying round ===
==== Group 1 ====
Team	Pld	W	D	L	GF	GA	GD	Pts
Cuba	3	3	0	0	13	2	+11	9
Bermuda	3	2	0	1	11	3	+8	6
Cayman Islands	3	1	0	2	6	9	−3	3
Bahamas	3	0	0	3	1	17	−16	0

5 May 1999

Cayman Islands	1–4	Cuba
Anderson		Darcourt; Bobadilla; Roldán

National Stadium, Bermuda
5 May 1999

Bermuda	6–0	Bahamas
Lightbourne; Wade; Robinson

Bermuda

7 May 1999

Bermuda	4–1	Cayman Islands
Smith; Boyles		Brown

Bermuda
7 May 1999

Cuba	7–0	Bahamas

Bermuda

9 May 1999

Bermuda	1–2	Cuba
Smith

Bermuda
9 May 1999

Cayman Islands	4 - 1	Bahamas
Whittaker; Brown; Dinnall

Bermuda

==== Group 2 ====
Team	Pld	W	D	L	GF	GA	GD	Pts
Guadeloupe	3	3	0	0	4	1	+3	9
Barbados	3	2	0	1	5	2	+3	6
Antigua and Barbuda	3	0	1	2	2	5	−3	1
Dominica	3	0	1	2	2	5	−3	1

10 March 1999

Barbados	2–0	Antigua and Barbuda

Guadeloupe
10 March 1999

Guadeloupe	1–0	Dominica

Guadeloupe

12 March 1999

Barbados	3–1	Dominica

Guadeloupe
12 March 1999

Guadeloupe	2–1	Antigua and Barbuda

Guadeloupe

14 March 1999

Antigua and Barbuda	1–1	Dominica

Guadeloupe
14 March 1999

Guadeloupe	1–0	Barbados

Guadeloupe

==== Group 3 ====
Team	Pld	W	D	L	GF	GA	GD	Pts
Saint Kitts and Nevis	3	2	0	1	9	8	+1	6
Saint Lucia	3	1	1	1	8	7	+1	4
Saint Vincent and the Grenadines	3	1	1	1	7	7	0	4
Martinique	3	1	0	2	4	6	−2	3

17 April 1999

Saint Lucia	3–1	Martinique

Martinique
17 April 1999

Saint Vincent and the Grenadines	3–4	Saint Kitts and Nevis

Martinique

18 April 1999

Saint Kitts and Nevis	1–2	Martinique

Martinique
18 April 1999

Saint Vincent and the Grenadines	2–2	Saint Lucia

Martinique

20 April 1999

Saint Kitts and Nevis	4–3	Saint Lucia

Martinique
21 April 1999

Saint Vincent and the Grenadines	2–1	Martinique

Martinique

==== Group 4 ====
Team	Pld	W	D	L	GF	GA	GD	Pts
Haiti	3	3	0	0	12	0	+12	9
British Virgin Islands	3	1	1	1	5	6	−1	4
Dominican Republic	3	1	1	1	2	4	−2	4
Puerto Rico	3	0	0	3	0	9	−9	0

17 March 1999

Dominican Republic	0–0	British Virgin Islands

Haiti
17 March 1999

Haiti	2–0	Puerto Rico

Haiti

19 March 1999

Haiti	4–0	Dominican Republic

Haiti
19 March 1999

Puerto Rico	0–5	British Virgin Islands

Haiti

21 March 1999

Dominican Republic	2–0	Puerto Rico

Haiti
21 March 1999

Haiti	6–0	British Virgin Islands

Haiti

==== Group 5 ====
Saint-Martin withdrew

Team	Pld	W	D	L	GF	GA	GD	Pts
Grenada	2	1	1	0	3	1	+2	4
Suriname	2	0	2	0	1	1	0	2
Netherlands Antilles	2	0	1	1	2	4	−2	1

4 May 1999

Netherlands Antilles	1–3	Grenada

Netherlands Antilles

6 May 1999

Grenada	0–0	Suriname

Netherlands Antilles

8 May 1999

Netherlands Antilles	1–1	Suriname

Netherlands Antilles

== Final tournament ==
=== Group 1 ===
Team	Pld	W	D	L	GF	GA	GD	Pts
Trinidad and Tobago	3	3	0	0	11	2	+9	9
Jamaica	3	2	0	1	7	3	+4	6
Grenada	3	1	0	2	3	10	−7	3
Guadeloupe	3	0	0	3	4	10	−6	0

3 June 1999

Grenada	2–1	Guadeloupe
Roberts

Hasely Crawford Stadium
Port of Spain, Trinidad and Tobago
3 June 1999

Trinidad and Tobago	1–0	Jamaica
John

Hasely Crawford Stadium
Port of Spain, Trinidad and Tobago

5 June 1999

Jamaica	5–1	Guadeloupe
Davis 43'; Griffiths 57'; Graham 62', 74', 83'		Plumasseau Didier 69'

Hasely Crawford Stadium
Port of Spain, Trinidad and Tobago
5 June 1999

Trinidad and Tobago	7–0	Grenada
Prosper 5', 9', 41'; Eve 28'; Dwarika 35'; Trotman 48', ?'

Hasely Crawford Stadium
Port of Spain, Trinidad and Tobago

7 June 1999

Jamaica	2–1	Grenada
Graham 62'; Fuller 72'		Roberts 32'

Hasely Crawford Stadium
Port of Spain, Trinidad and Tobago
7 June 1999

Trinidad and Tobago	3–2	Guadeloupe
Prosper; Mason 84', 90'		Damas-Agis

Hasely Crawford Stadium
Port of Spain, Trinidad and Tobago

=== Group 2 ===
Team	Pld	W	D	L	GF	GA	GD	Pts
Cuba	3	3	0	0	6	1	+5	9
Haiti	3	2	0	1	7	6	+1	6
Brazil U-20	3	1	0	2	8	5	+3	3
Saint Kitts and Nevis	3	0	0	3	0	9	−9	0

4 June 1999

Cuba	3–1	Haiti
Martén 28', 50'; Álvarez 40'		Tardieu 12'

Dr. João Havelange Centre of Excellence
Port of Spain, Trinidad and Tobago
4 June 1999

Brazil U-20	5–0	Saint Kitts and Nevis

Dr. João Havelange Centre of Excellence
Port of Spain, Trinidad and Tobago

6 June 1999

Haiti	2–0	Saint Kitts and Nevis
Vorbe 16'; Chevalier

Dr. João Havelange Centre of Excellence
Port of Spain, Trinidad and Tobago
6 June 1999

Brazil U-20	0–1	Cuba
		Álvarez

Dr. João Havelange Centre of Excellence
Port of Spain, Trinidad and Tobago

8 June 1999

Brazil U-20	3–4	Haiti
De Souza 48'; Da Silva 70'; Salvino 82'		Michel Gabriel 33'; Wilson Chevalier 61'; Patrick Tardieu 68'; De Souza 85' (o.g.)

Dr. João Havelange Centre of Excellence
Port of Spain, Trinidad and Tobago
8 June 1999

Cuba	2–0	Saint Kitts and Nevis
Álvarez 36', 87'

Dr. João Havelange Centre of Excellence
Port of Spain, Trinidad and Tobago

=== Semi-finals ===
10 June 1999

Cuba	2–0	Jamaica
Gandara 55' (pen.); Álvarez 89'

Hasely Crawford Stadium
Port of Spain, Trinidad and Tobago

11 June 1999

Trinidad and Tobago	6–1	Haiti
Dwarika 19'; Eve; Andrews 56'; Trotman 82'; Mason 86'; John 89'		Chevalier 53'

Hasely Crawford Stadium
Port of Spain, Trinidad and Tobago

The match was postponed from June 10 due to bad lighting.

=== Third-place match ===
13 June 1999

Jamaica	v	Haiti

Hasely Crawford Stadium
Port of Spain, Trinidad and Tobago

The third place playoff was cancelled due to the condition of the field. Third place was shared between Jamaica and Haiti.

=== Final ===
13 June 1999

Trinidad and Tobago	2–1 (ASDET)	Cuba
Rougier 66'; John 119'		Prado 88'

Hasely Crawford Stadium
Port of Spain, Trinidad and Tobago
Referee: Michael Kennedy

== Result ==
1999 Caribbean Cup winner

Trinidad and Tobago
Seventh title

Trinidad and Tobago qualified for the 2000 Gold Cup

== Awards ==
- Most Valuable Player

(Cuba) Raciel Martinez

- Top Goalscorer

(Cuba) Ariel Álvarez (five goals)

- Top Goalkeeper

(Trinidad and Tobago) Clayton Ince

- Fair Play Trophy:

Jamaica

== Top goalscorers ==
Five goals

- (Cuba) Ariel Álvarez

Four goals

- (Trinidad and Tobago) Peter Prosper
- (Jamaica) Ray Graham

Three goals

- (Haiti) Wilson Chevalier
- (Trinidad and Tobago) Stern John
- (Trinidad and Tobago) Stokley Mason

Two goals

- (Cuba) Luis Marten
- (Guadeloupe) Damas-Agis Patrice
- (Grenada) Jason Roberts
- (Haiti) Patrick Tardieu
- (Trinidad and Tobago) Mickey Trotman
- (Trinidad and Tobago) Angus Eve
- (Trinidad and Tobago) Arnold Dwarika
