= Football at the 1991 Pan American Games =

Football – Men's tournament at the 1991 Pan American Games
- Venue: Estadio Panamericano
- Dates: 4–13 August

Medalists
Gold medal	United States
Silver medal	Mexico
Bronze medal	Cuba

The eleventh edition of the Men's Football Tournament at the Pan American Games was held in Havana, Cuba from 4 August to 13 August 1991. After the preliminary round there was a knock-out stage.

Due to a conflict with CONCACAF, CONMEBOL boycotted the Games: South American teams, including title holder Brazil, did not participate in the competition.

The United States, coached by Lothar Osiander, won their first Pan American title. The United States included a number of players from the highly successful U-20 World Championship squad of 1989, including Brad Friedel, Joe-Max Moore, Steve Snow, Manny Lagos, Yari Allnutt, Kasey Keller, Mike Burns, Cobi Jones and Claudio Reyna.

== Participants ==
- Canada
- Cuba
- Haiti
- Honduras
- Mexico
- Nicaragua
- Suriname
- United States

== First round ==
=== Group A ===
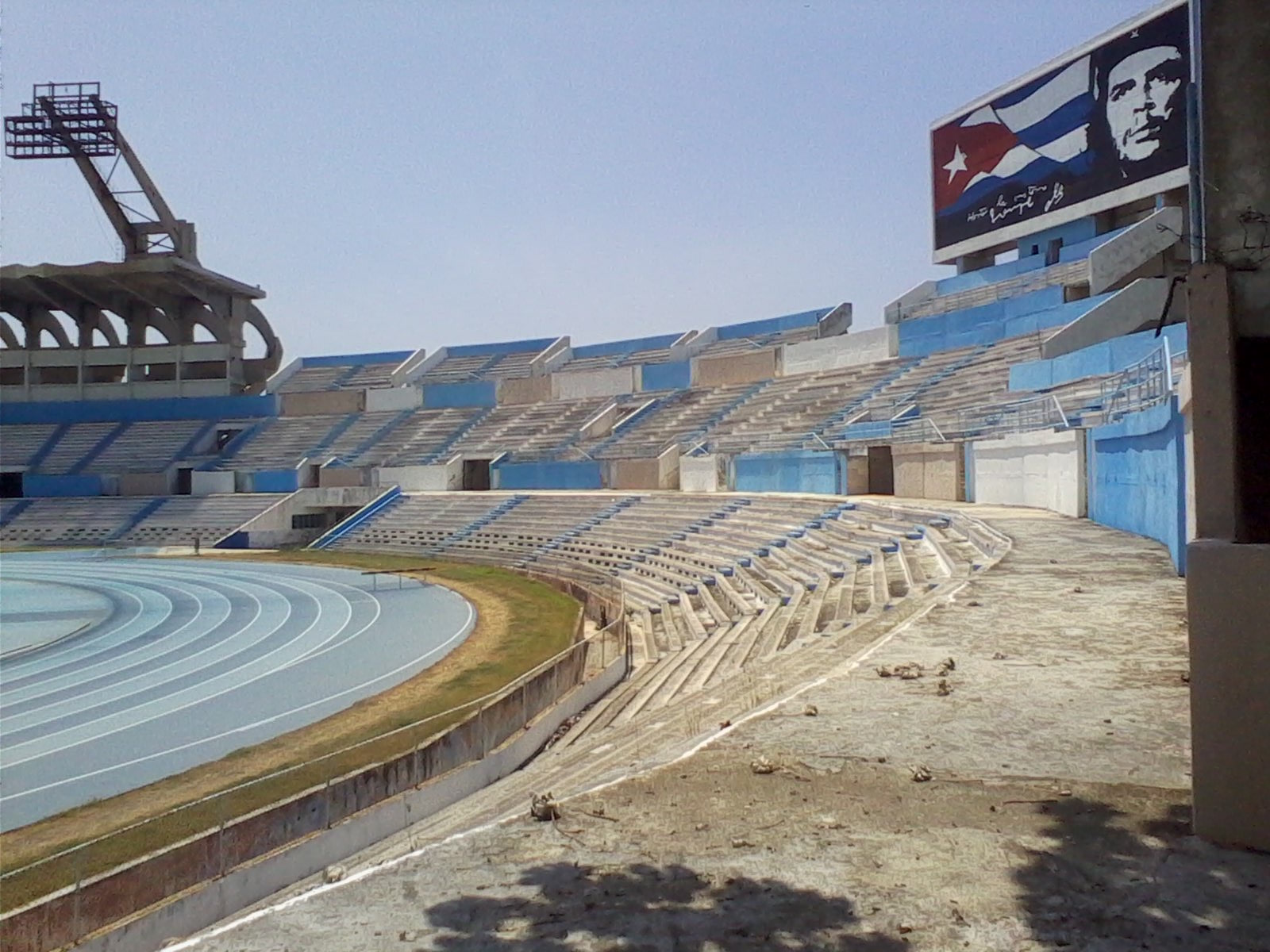
Estadio Panamericano hosted all the matches

Pos	Team	Pld	W	D	L	GF	GA	GD	Pts	Qualification
1	Mexico	3	2	1	0	12	1	+11	5	Advance to Semifinals
2	Cuba	3	1	2	0	6	3	+3	4	Advance to Semifinals
3	Haiti	3	1	1	1	13	8	+5	3	
4	Nicaragua	3	0	0	3	1	20	−19	0	

August 1991

Haiti	1–6	Mexico

Estadio Panamericano, Havana

August 1991

Cuba	4–1	Nicaragua

Estadio Panamericano, Havana

August 1991

Mexico	6–0	Nicaragua

Estadio Panamericano, Havana

August 1991

Cuba	2–2	Haiti

Estadio Panamericano, Havana

August 1991

Haiti	10–0	Nicaragua

Estadio Panamericano, Havana

August 1991

Cuba	0–0	Mexico

Estadio Panamericano, Havana

=== Group B ===
Pos	Team	Pld	W	D	L	GF	GA	GD	Pts	Qualification
1	United States	3	3	0	0	6	2	+4	6	Advance to Semifinals
2	Honduras	3	1	1	1	5	4	+1	3	Advance to Semifinals
3	Suriname	3	1	1	1	4	3	+1	3	
4	Canada	3	0	0	3	3	9	−6	0	

August 1991

Suriname	0–1	United States

Estadio Panamericano, Havana

August 1991

Canada	1–3	Honduras

Estadio Panamericano, Havana

August 1991

Honduras	1–2	United States

Estadio Panamericano, Havana

August 1991

Canada	1–3	Suriname

Estadio Panamericano, Havana

August 1991

Honduras	1–1	Suriname

Estadio Panamericano, Havana

August 1991

Canada	1–3	United States

Estadio Panamericano, Havana

== Final round ==
=== Bracket ===
Semi-finals
11 August – Havana
Mexico	6
Honduras	1
11 August – Havana
United States	2
Cuba	1

Final
13 August – Havana
United States	2
Mexico	1
Third place
13 August – Havana
Cuba	1
Honduras	0

=== Semifinals ===
11 August

Honduras	1–6	Mexico
Gallegos 54'		Sánchez 3'; Ramírez 41'; Noriega 43'; Castañeda 45'; Mascareño 83'; Romero 87'

Estadio Panamericano, Havana

11 August

Cuba	1–2	United States
Bobadilla 70'		Washington 29'; Reyna 65'

Estadio Panamericano, Havana

=== Bronze Medal match ===
13 August

Cuba	1–0	Honduras
Bobadilla 17'

Estadio Panamericano, Havana

=== Gold Medal match ===
13 August

United States	2–1 (a.e.t.)	Mexico
Reyna 34'; Moore 95'		Mariscal 16'

Estadio Panamericano, Havana

Team details

United States
Mexico

1991 Pan American Games winners

United States
First title

== Medalists ==
Event	Gold	Silver	Bronze
Men's tournament	United States: 1. Kasey Keller; 2. Cam Rast; 3. Curt Onalfo; 4. Michael Burns; 5. Erik Imler; 6. Dario Brose; 7. Yari Allnutt; 8. Michael Lapper; 9. Dante Washington; 10. Claudio Reyna; 11. Manny Lagos; 12. Cobi Jones; 13. Joe-Max Moore; 14. Eloy Salgado; 15. Rhett Harty; 16. Steve Snow; 17. Brad Friedel; 18. Alexi Lalas; Lothar Osiander (coach)	Mexico: 1. Sergio Bernal; 2. Ricardo Cadena; 3. Antonio Noriega; 4. Rodolfo Sánchez; 5. Joaquín Hernández; 6. Agustín Valdez; 7. Leopoldo Castañeda; 8. Jorge Castañeda; 9. Carlos Nápoles; 10. Ramón Ramírez; 11. Gerardo Mascareño; 12. Alejandro Herrera; 13. Camilo Romero; 14. Salvador Mariscal; 15. Felipe Peña; 16. Ramiro Romero; 17. Donato Castañeda; 18. David Rangel; Manuel Lapuente (coach)	Cuba: 1. Elio Sánchez; 2. Luis Elizalde; 3. Alfredo Maury; 4. Rafael Ayllon; 5. Julio C. Díaz; 6. Jorge Pérez; 7. Maximiliano Sánchez; 8. Alfredo González; 9. Lázaro Darcourt; 10. Manuel Bobadilla; 11. Bernardo Rosette; 12. Víctor Pérez; 13. Juan C. Montalvo; 14. Ariel Álvarez; 15. Osmín Hernández; 16. Alexis Guzmán; 17. Pedro Báez; 18. Wilfredo Carbo; Giovanni Campari (coach)

== Goalscorers ==
There were 64 goals scored in 16 matches, for an average of 4 goals per match.

4 goals

- (Mexico) Leopoldo Castañeda
- (Mexico) Antonio Noriega
- (United States) Steve Snow

3 goals

- (Haiti) Jean Fleural
- (Cuba) Manuel Bobadilla
- (Mexico) Ramón Ramires
- (Honduras) Wilmer Neal

Source: PanamSports
