= 1995 Caribbean Cup =

Shell Caribbean Cup

Tournament details
- Host countries: Cayman Islands; Jamaica
- Dates: 19–30 July 1995
- Teams: 8

Final positions
- Champions: Trinidad and Tobago (4th title)
- Runners-up: Saint Vincent and the Grenadines
- Third place: Cuba
- Fourth place: Cayman Islands

Tournament statistics
- Matches played: 16
- Goals scored: 60 (3.75 per match)
- Top scorer: (Trinidad and Tobago) Angus Eve (6 goals)

The 1995 Caribbean Cup, known as the Shell Caribbean Cup for sponsorship reasons, was the 13th international association football championship for members of the Caribbean Football Union (CFU). It was the seventh edition of the Caribbean Cup which replaced the CFU Championship. Hosted by the Cayman Islands and Jamaica, the competition ran from 19–30 July 1995 and was contested by the national teams of Antigua and Barbuda, Cayman Islands, Cuba, French Guiana, Jamaica, Saint Lucia, Saint Vincent and the Grenadines and Trinidad and Tobago. The competition was used as part of the qualification process for the 1996 CONCACAF Gold Cup.

The final tournament began with the first matches in the group stage on 12 July 1995 and ended with the final on 30 July 1995. Defending champions Trinidad and Tobago defeated Saint Vincent and the Grenadines 5–0 in the final to win the competition for the fourth time. Both finalists qualified for the 1996 CONCACAF Gold Cup.

== Background ==
The Caribbean Football Union (CFU) was founded in January 1978 as a sub-confederation of the Confederation of North, Central America and Caribbean Association Football (CONCACAF). Later the same year, the first CFU Championship was organised in Trinidad and Tobago. The competition was held semi-regularly until the final edition in 1988. From 1989, it was replaced by the Caribbean Cup.

The tournament was sponsored by Royal Dutch Shell following the input of employees of Shell Antilles and Gulanas Ltd.

Trinidad and Tobago were the defending champions after winning the previous edition as hosts. Trinidad and Tobago were also the most successful team in the history of the competition after winning the trophy on three previous occasions.

Aruba would be represented in the competition by SV Racing Club Aruba who were strengthened by guest players from SV Estrella, SV Dakota, SV Bubali, SV La Fama and SV River Plate Aruba.

== Format ==
A qualifying tournament was held to determine five of the eight teams that would participate in the final tournament. Co-hosts the Cayman Islands and Jamaica as well as holders Trinidad and Tobago qualified automatically. In the preliminary round, two of the 21 competing teams contested a two-legged tie in which the team that scored the most goals on aggregate advanced. In the qualifying round, the remaining teams were drawn into five groups of four teams. Groups one and two were played as a single round-robin where each team would play all of the others once. The winner of each group would qualify for the final tournament. Groups three, four and five were played as knock-out tournaments. In round one, the four teams were drawn into two two-legged ties. The team that scored the most goals on aggregate advanced to the second round. The two winning teams in each group would then contest a final two-legged tie and the team that scored the most goals on aggregate would qualify for the final tournament.

For the final tournament, the eight teams were drawn into two groups of four teams. Each group was played as a single round-robin where each team would play all of the others once. The winners and runners-up of each group would contest the semi-finals with the winners advancing to the final and the losers contesting the third-place play-off. The two finalists would qualify for the 1996 CONCACAF Gold Cup.

=== Participants ===
- Anguilla
- Antigua and Barbuda
- Aruba
- Barbados
- British Virgin Islands
- Cayman Islands
- Cuba
- Dominica
- Dominican Republic
- French Guiana
- Guadeloupe
- Grenada
- Guyana
- Jamaica
- Martinique
- Montserrat
- Netherlands Antilles
- Puerto Rico
- Saint Lucia
- Saint Kitts and Nevis
- Saint Vincent and the Grenadines
- Sint Maarten
- Suriname
- Trinidad and Tobago

== Preliminary round ==
The Netherlands Antilles won both legs of their tie with Aruba to advance to the qualifying round.

Preliminary round
Team 1	Agg.	Team 2	1st leg	2nd leg
Aruba	5–7	Netherlands Antilles	3–4	2–3

=== Matches ===
7 May 1995

Aruba	3–4	Netherlands Antilles
Lake 2'; Venegas		Martina 2'; Jansen; Bonevacia

Trinidad Stadion, Oranjestad
14 May 1995

Netherlands Antilles	3–2	Aruba
Lodovica; Martina; Jansen		Kock; Lake

Bramendiweg Sportpark, Willemstad

Netherlands Antilles won 7–5 on aggregate.

== Qualifying tournament ==
=== Group 1 ===
Qualifying group 1, held in the Dominican Republic, was played between 23 and 27 May 1995. Cuba qualified as group winners after defeating Puerto Rico 9–0 in their final match.

==== Table ====
Pos	Team	Pld	W	D	L	GF	GA	GD	Pts	Qualification
1	Cuba	3	3	0	0	15	0	+15	9	Qualification to 1995 Caribbean Cup
2	Netherlands Antilles	3	1	1	1	4	6	−2	4	
3	Dominican Republic	3	1	0	2	4	6	−2	3	
4	Puerto Rico	3	0	1	2	3	14	−11	1	

==== Results ====
23 May 1995

Cuba	3–0	Netherlands Antilles
Hernández 2'; Roldan

Estadio Quisqueya, Santo Domingo
23 May 1995

Dominican Republic	3–1	Puerto Rico
García; Aquino; Vicioso		Lugris

Estadio Quisqueya, Santo Domingo

25 May 1995

Dominican Republic	0–3	Cuba
		Marten; Álvarez; Hernández

Estadio Quisqueya, Santo Domingo
25 May 1995

Puerto Rico	2–2	Netherlands Antilles
Montero; Rivera		Samboe 2'

Estadio Quisqueya, Santo Domingo

27 May 1995

Dominican Republic	1–2	Netherlands Antilles
Rodriguez		Constacia; Martina

Estadio Quisqueya, Santo Domingo
27 May 1995

Cuba	9–0	Puerto Rico
Hernández 3'; Bobadilla 2'; Cruz 2'; García; Armelio Luis

Estadio Quisqueya, Santo Domingo

=== Group 2 ===
Qualifying group 2, held in French Guiana, was played between 9 and 13 May 1995. All four teams finished with a record of one win, one draw and one defeat. French Guiana qualified as group winners on goal difference.

==== Table ====
Pos	Team	Pld	W	D	L	GF	GA	GD	Pts	Qualification
1	French Guiana	3	1	1	1	7	5	+2	4	Qualification to 1995 Caribbean Cup
2	Martinique	3	1	1	1	5	4	+1	4	
3	Guadeloupe	3	1	1	1	5	5	0	4	
4	Suriname	3	1	1	1	3	6	−3	4	

==== Results ====
9 May 1995

French Guiana	1–3	Martinique
Morisseau 15'		Emika 35', 40'; Elismar 65'

Stade de Baduel, Cayenne
9 May 1995

Guadeloupe	1–2	Suriname
Wills 20'		Kempenaar 35', 75'

Stade de Baduel, Cayenne

11 May 1995

French Guiana	2–2	Guadeloupe
Aubert 68'; Mettela 78'		Pierre-John 25'; Coucoutou 50'

Stade de Baduel, Cayenne
11 May 1995

Martinique	1–1	Suriname
Jean-Louis 37'		Josefzoon 48'

Stade de Baduel, Cayenne

13 May 1995

French Guiana	4–0	Suriname
Cincinnat 31', 40'; Noel 55'; Durcheville 81'

Stade de Baduel, Cayenne
13 May 1995

Guadeloupe	2–1	Martinique
Pierre-John 75'; Ramssamy 86'		Emica 80'

Stade de Baduel, Cayenne

=== Group 3 ===
Saint Lucia defeated Grenada and Barbados to qualify for the final tournament.

Qualifying group 3
Team 1	Agg.	Team 2	1st leg	2nd leg
First round
Barbados	7–0	Guyana	3–0	4–0
Grenada	2–4	Saint Lucia	2–0	0–4
Second round
Barbados	2–3	Saint Lucia	1–1	1–2

==== First round ====
26 Mar 1995

Barbados	3–0	Guyana
Mullins; Riley; Goodridge

Hadley Court Stadium, Bridgetown
2 Apr 1995

Guyana	0–4	Barbados
		Riley 35', 41', 74'; Alexander 89'

Bourda Cricket Ground, Georgetown

Barbados won 7–0 on aggregate.

21 Mar 1995

Grenada	2–0	Saint Lucia
Forsyth; Charles

Grenada National Stadium, St George's
9 Apr 1995

Saint Lucia	4–0	Grenada
Callender 2'; Rismay; Elva

Mindoo Phillip Park, Castries

Saint Lucia won 4–2 on aggregate.

==== Second round ====
30 Apr 1995

Barbados	1–1	Saint Lucia
Riley		Edmund

Hadley Court Stadium, Bridgetown
7 May 1995

Saint Lucia	2–1	Barbados
Emmanuel; Elva		Llewellyn Riley

Mindoo Phillip Park, Castries

Saint Lucia won 3–2 on aggregate.

=== Group 4 ===
Saint Vincent and the Grenadines defeated Dominica and Montserrat to qualify for the final tournament.

Qualifying group 3
Team 1	Agg.	Team 2	1st leg	2nd leg
First round
Montserrat	4–2	Anguilla	3–2	1–0
Dominica	0–1	Saint Vincent and the Grenadines	0–1	0–0
Second round
Saint Vincent and the Grenadines	20–0	Montserrat	9–0	11–0

==== First round ====
26 Mar 1995

Montserrat	3–2	Anguilla
Edwards; Wade; Morris		Carter; Proctor

Sturge Park, Woodlands
2 Apr 1995

Anguilla	0–1	Montserrat
		Webb

Ronald Webster Park, The Valley

Montserrat won 4–2 on aggregate.

26 Mar 1995

Dominica	0–1	Saint Vincent and the Grenadines
		Velox

Windsor Park, Roseau
2 Apr 1995

Saint Vincent and the Grenadines	0–0	Dominica

Amos Vale Stadium, Kingstown

Saint Vincent and the Grenadines won 1–0 on aggregate.

==== Second round ====
30 Apr 1995

Saint Vincent and the Grenadines	9–0	Montserrat
Jack 3'; Hinds 3'; Harry; Chewitt; John

Amos Vale Stadium, Kingstown
7 May 1995

Montserrat	0–11	Saint Vincent and the Grenadines
		Jack 6'; Hinds 2'; Chewitt 2'; Harry

Sturge Park, Woodlands

Saint Vincent and the Grenadines won 20–0 on aggregate.

=== Group 5 ===
Saint Kitts and Nevis defeated Sint Maarten and Antigua and Barbuda to qualify for the final tournament.

Qualifying group 3
Team 1	Agg.	Team 2	1st leg	2nd leg
First round
Sint Maarten	1–2	Saint Kitts and Nevis	0–2	1–0
Antigua and Barbuda	w/o	British Virgin Islands	—	—
Second round
Saint Kitts and Nevis	3–3 (4–3 p)	Antigua and Barbuda	1–1	2–2 (a.e.t.)

==== First round ====
19 Mar 1995

Sint Maarten	0–2	Saint Kitts and Nevis
		Gumbs; Francis

26 Mar 1995

Saint Kitts and Nevis	5–0	Sint Maarten
Gumbs 3'; Francis 2'

Warner Park, Basseterre

Saint Kitts and Nevis won 2–1 on aggregate.

Antigua and Barbuda	Cancelled	British Virgin Islands

British Virgin Islands	Cancelled	Antigua and Barbuda

The British Virgin Islands withdrew, Antigua and Barbuda advanced.

==== Second round ====
30 Apr 1995

Saint Kitts and Nevis	1–1	Antigua and Barbuda
Huggins		Gonsalves

Warner Park, Basseterre
21 May 1995

Antigua and Barbuda	2–2 (a.e.t.)	Saint Kitts and Nevis
Gonsalves; Edwards		Gumbs; Kelly
Penalties
	4–3

Yasco Stadium, St. John's

3–3 on aggregate. Saint Kitts and Nevis won 4–3 on penalties.

== Final tournament ==
=== Group stage ===
==== Group A ====
In group A, Saint Vincent and the Grenadines and the Cayman Islands advanced to the semi-finals after winning their first two matches. Saint Vincent and the Grenadines won the group on goal difference after the two teams drew 2–2 in their final match.

===== Table =====
Pos	Team	Pld	W	D	L	GF	GA	GD	Pts	Qualification
1	Saint Vincent and the Grenadines	3	2	1	0	10	4	+6	7	Qualification to the semi-finals
2	Cayman Islands	3	2	1	0	5	2	+3	7	Qualification to the semi-finals
3	Antigua and Barbuda	3	1	0	2	3	8	−5	3	
4	French Guiana	3	0	0	3	2	6	−4	0	

===== Results =====
21 July 1995

Cayman Islands	2–0	Antigua and Barbuda
Ramoon 2'

Grand Cayman
21 July 1995

French Guiana	1–3	Saint Vincent and the Grenadines
Saibou		Jack; Velox 2'

Grand Cayman

23 July 1995

Antigua and Barbuda	1–5	Saint Vincent and the Grenadines
Gonsalves		Jack 2'; Velox (pen.); Hinds; Prince

Grand Cayman
23 July 1995

Cayman Islands	1–0	French Guiana
Samuels

Grand Cayman

25 July 1995

Antigua and Barbuda	2–1	French Guiana
Gonsalves; Edwards		Golitin

Grand Cayman
25 July 1995

Cayman Islands	2–2	Saint Vincent and the Grenadines
Welcome; Rivers		Keizer 2'

Grand Cayman

==== Group B ====
In group A, Cuba, Jamaica and Trinidad and Tobago all finished with a record of two wins and one defeat. Trinidad and Tobago advanced as group winners on goal difference. Cuba and Jamaica were also tied on goal difference and goals scored. Cuba advanced to the semi-finals on their head-to-head record with Jamaica.

===== Table =====
Pos	Team	Pld	W	D	L	GF	GA	GD	Pts	Qualification
1	Trinidad and Tobago	3	2	0	1	7	1	+6	6	Qualification to the semi-finals
2	Cuba	3	2	0	1	4	3	+1	6	Qualification to the semi-finals
3	Jamaica	3	2	0	1	4	3	+1	6	
4	Saint Lucia	3	0	0	3	1	9	−8	0	

===== Results =====
19 July 1995

Jamaica	2–1	Saint Lucia
Lowe 10'; Wright 59'		Elva 37'

National Stadium, Kingston
Attendance: 2,000
19 July 1995

Cuba	0–2	Trinidad and Tobago
		Eve 31', 76'

National Stadium, Kingston
Attendance: 2,000

21 July 1995

Jamaica	1–2	Cuba
Whitmore		Hernández; Álvarez

Montego Bay
Attendance: 3,000
21 July 1995

Saint Lucia	0–5	Trinidad and Tobago
		Dwarika 2'; Lewis; Eve

Montego Bay
Attendance: 3,000

23 July 1995

Cuba	2–0	Saint Lucia
Darcourt 2'

National Stadium, Kingston
Attendance: 1,890
23 July 1995

Jamaica	1–0	Trinidad and Tobago
Whitmore

National Stadium, Kingston
Attendance: 1,890

=== Knockout stage ===
Knockout phase
Team 1	Score	Team 2
Semi-finals
Saint Vincent and the Grenadines	3–2	Cuba
Cayman Islands	2–9	Trinidad and Tobago
Third-place play-off
Cayman Islands	0–3	Cuba
Final
Trinidad and Tobago	5–0	Saint Vincent and the Grenadines

==== Semi-finals ====
Group winners Saint Vincent and the Grenadines and Trinidad and Tobago both advanced to the final after defeating Cuba and the Cayman Islands respectively.

27 July 1995

Saint Vincent and the Grenadines	3–2	Cuba
Hinds 46'; Jack 48'; Prince 51'		Hernández 13'; Garrido 68'

Grand Cayman
28 July 1995

Cayman Islands	2–9	Trinidad and Tobago
Whittaker; Ramoon		Lewis 3'; Eve 2'; Dwarika 2'; Cyrus 2'

Grand Cayman

==== Third place play-off ====
Lázaro Darcourt and Manuel Bobadilla both scored as Cuba defeated the Cayman Islands 3–0 to finish third.

30 July 1995

Cayman Islands	0–3	Cuba
		Darcourt; Bobadilla; (o.g.)

==== Final ====
Goals from Angus Eve, Clint Marcelle, Terry St. Louis and Arnold Dwarika helped Trinidad and Tobago to a 5–0 win as they won the competition for the fourth time.

30 July 1995

Trinidad and Tobago	5–0	Saint Vincent and the Grenadines
Eve 35'; Brown 37' (o.g.); Marcelle 38'; St. Louis 65'; Dwarika 68'

Grand Cayman
Attendance: 10,000
