= List of Livingston F.C. international footballers =

This is a list of past and present Livingston F.C. players who have been capped by their country whilst at the club.

Thirteen nations have played international matches with teams featuring Livingston players.

Players in bold are still at the club.

== Current national teams ==
=== Australia ===
Livingston F.C. Australian international footballers (Australia)
Player name	Date of first cap	Date of last cap	Number of caps
**Tete Yengi**	6 June 2026	14 June 2026	2

=== Barbados ===
Livingston F.C. Barbardian international footballers (Barbados)
Player name	Date of first cap	Date of last cap	Number of caps
Horace Stoute	24 April 1996	30 June 1996	5
David Alleyne	14 May 1996	30 June 1996	4

=== Cameroon ===
Livingston F.C. Cameroonian international footballers (Cameroon)
Player name	Date of first cap	Date of last cap	Number of caps
Gustave Bahoken	23 June 2003	23 June 2003	1

=== Canada ===
Livingston F.C. Canadian international footballers (Canada)
Player name	Date of first cap	Date of last cap	Number of caps
Davide Xausa	24 April 2001	18 January 2003	11

=== Curaçao ===
Livingston F.C. Curaçaoan international footballers (Curaçao)
Player name	Date of first cap	Date of last cap	Number of caps
Joshua Brenet	11 October 2025	11 October 2025	1

=== Dominican Republic ===
Livingston F.C. Dominicans international footballers (Dominican Republic)
Player name	Date of first cap	Date of last cap	Number of caps
Luiyi de Lucas	16 June 2023	17 November 2023	6

=== Estonia ===
Livingston F.C. Estonians international footballers (Estonia)
Player name	Date of first cap	Date of last cap	Number of caps
Alex Tamm	27 March 2026	30 March 2026	2

=== Hungary ===
Livingston F.C. Hungarians international footballers (Hungary)
Player name	Date of first cap	Date of last cap	Number of caps
Gábor Vincze	31 May 2005	31 May 2005	1

=== Liberia ===
Livingston F.C. Liberian international footballers (Liberia)
Player name	Date of first cap	Date of last cap	Number of caps
Mohammed Sangare	12 September 2023	9 June 2024	9

=== Scotland ===
Livingston F.C. Scottish international footballers (Scotland)
Player name	Date of first cap	Date of last cap	Number of caps
David McNamee	27 May 2004	30 May 2004	2
Jamie McAllister	30 May 2004	30 May 2004	1

=== South Africa ===
Livingston F.C. South African international footballers (South Africa)
Player name	Date of first cap	Date of last cap	Number of caps
Aphelele Teto	2 March 2025	3 May 2025	2

=== Togo ===
Livingston F.C. Togolese international footballers (Togo)
Player name	Date of first cap	Date of last cap	Number of caps
Chérif Touré Mamam	12 October 2002	18 June 2005	11
Steve Lawson	9 September 2018	17 November 2020	14

=== Trinidad & Tobago ===
Livingston F.C. Trinidadian international footballers (Trinidad and Tobago)
Player name	Date of first cap	Date of last cap	Number of caps
Marvin Andrews	25 February 2001	30 May 2004	26
