= David Alleyne =

David Alleyne may refer to:

- David Alleyne (cricketer) (born 1976), English cricketer
- David Alleyne (footballer) (born 1972), Barbadian footballer
- Prodigy (David Alleyne), a Marvel Comics superhero
