= Llewellyn Riley =

Barbadian footballer

Personal information
- Full name: Llewellyn Riley
- Date of birth: 17 September 1972 (age 54)
- Place of birth: Barbados
- Position: Striker

Senior career*
Years	Team	Apps	(Gls)
1996–1999	Notre Dame Bayville		(17+)
1999–2000	Galway United	1	(0)
2000–2001	Sligo Rovers	6	(0)
2001–2011	Notre Dame Bayville		(16+)

International career
1995–2005	Barbados	43	(23)
- * Club domestic league appearances and goals

Llewellyn Riley (born 17 September 1972) is a Barbadian former footballer, who played as a striker.

== Club career ==
In 1994, Riley had a trial with Scottish side Meadowbank Thistle along with his countrymen, David Alleyne, Wayne Sobers and Horace Stoute. Due to work permit restrictions, Riley was not eligible to play in Scotland as he had not played enough games at international level.

== International career ==
Riley represented Barbados at the international level over a span of 10 years. With 23 goals, he is the all-time top scorer for the Barbados national team.

== Career statistics ==
=== International ===
Appearances and goals by national team and year
National team	Year	Apps	Goals
Barbados	1995	4	6
Barbados	1996	2	0
Barbados	1998	1	0
Barbados	2000	14	8
Barbados	2001	5	4
Barbados	2002	3	0
Barbados	2003	3	0
Barbados	2004	6	3
Barbados	2005	5	2
Total		43	23

Scores and results list Barbados' goal tally first, score column indicates score after each Riley goal.

List of international goals scored by Llewellyn Riley
No.	Date	Venue	Opponent	Score	Result	Competition	Ref.
1	26 March 1995	Barbados National Stadium, Saint Michael, Barbados	Guyana	–	3–0	1995 Caribbean Cup qualification	
2	2 April 1995	Bourda, Georgetown, Guyana	Guyana	1–0	4–0	1995 Caribbean Cup qualification	
3	2 April 1995	Bourda, Georgetown, Guyana	Guyana	2–0	4–0	1995 Caribbean Cup qualification	
4	2 April 1995	Bourda, Georgetown, Guyana	Guyana	3–0	4–0	1995 Caribbean Cup qualification	
5	30 April 1995	Barbados National Stadium, Saint Michael, Barbados	Saint Lucia	–	1–1	1995 Caribbean Cup qualification	
6	7 May 1995	Mindoo Phillip Park, Castries, Saint Lucia	Saint Lucia	–	1–2	1995 Caribbean Cup qualification	
7	17 February 2000	Barbados National Stadium, Saint Michael, Barbados	Saint Kitts and Nevis	1–0	1–0	Friendly	
8	29 March 2000	Barbados National Stadium, Saint Michael, Barbados	Antigua and Barbuda	–	2–2	Friendly	
9	18 March 2003	Grenada National Stadium, St. George's, Grenada	Grenada	3–2	3–2	2002 FIFA World Cup qualification	
10	1 April 2000	Trinidad Stadium, Oranjestad, Aruba	Aruba	1–0	3–1	2002 FIFA World Cup qualification	
11	16 April 2000	Barbados National Stadium, Saint Michael, Barbados	Aruba	4–0	4–0	2002 FIFA World Cup qualification	
12	7 May 2000	Pedro Marrero Stadium, Havana, Cuba	Cuba	1–1	1–1	2002 FIFA World Cup qualification	
13	16 July 2000	Barbados National Stadium, Saint Michael, Barbados	Costa Rica	1–1	2–1	2002 FIFA World Cup qualification	
14	8 October 2000	Barbados National Stadium, Saint Michael, Barbados	Guatemala	1–2	1–3	2002 FIFA World Cup qualification	
15	25 March 2001	Georgetown, Guyana	Guyana	2–1	2–1	Friendly	
16	8 April 2001	André Kamperveen Stadion, Paramaribo, Suriname	Aruba	1–0	5–2	2001 Caribbean Cup qualification	
17	19 May 2001	Hasely Crawford Stadium, Port of Spain, Trinidad and Tobago	Martinique	1–1	1–3	2001 Caribbean Cup	
18	19 May 2001	Hasely Crawford Stadium, Port of Spain, Trinidad and Tobago	Jamaica	1–2	1–2	2001 Caribbean Cup	
19	1 January 2004	Bermuda National Stadium, Devonshire Parish, Bermuda	Bermuda	2–0	4–0	Friendly	
20	11 January 2004	Barbados National Stadium, Saint Michael, Barbados	Grenada	2–0	2–0	Friendly	
21	31 January 2004	Grenada National Stadium, St. George's, Grenada	Grenada	1–0	1–0	Friendly	
22	30 January 2005	Barbados National Stadium, Saint Michael, Barbados	Saint Vincent and the Grenadines	1–1	3–1	Friendly	
23	30 January 2005	Barbados National Stadium, Saint Michael, Barbados	Saint Vincent and the Grenadines	3–1	3–1	Friendly	
