= Wayne Sobers =

Barbadian footballer

Personal information
- Date of birth: 16 August 1969 (age 57)
- Place of birth: Barbados
- Position: Defender

Senior career*
Years	Team	Apps	(Gls)
2001–2008	Notre Dame		(2)

International career
1992–2005	Barbados	30	(1)
- * Club domestic league appearances and goals as of 14 May 2011

Wayne Sobers (born 16 August 1969) is a Barbadian former footballer who played as a defender.

== Club career ==
In 1994, Sobers had a trial with Scottish club Meadowbank Thistle along with his countrymen, David Alleyne, Llewellyn Riley and Horace Stoute. Due to work permit restrictions, Thistle could only sign two of the Barbadians they had on trial. The club signed Alleyne and Stoute on permanent deals, and Sobers left Scotland and returned to Barbados without a contract.

He played for Barbados Premier Division club Notre Dame between 2001 and 2008, and he won the Barbados Premier Division in 2002, 2004, 2005, and 2008, and the Barbados FA Cup in 2004 and 2008. He scored his first goal for the club during the 6–2 victory against Brittons Hill on 11 February 2001. His only other goal for the club was scored on 19 January 2003 during the 2–1 victory against Ivy Rovers.

== International career ==
Sobers played for the Barbadian national team between 1992 and 2005, which included nine FIFA World Cup qualifying matches. He debuted on 22 July 1990 during the 2–2 draw against Martinique during the 1990 Caribbean Cup. He scored his only goal for Barbados on 28 April 1996 during the 2–0 win against Jamaica during 1996 Caribbean Cup qualification in which Jamaica won the tie after a penalty shoot-out.

== Career statistics ==
=== International ===
Appearances and goals by national team and year
National team	Year	Apps	Goals
Barbados	1990	1	0
Barbados	1992	2	0
Barbados	1996	2	1
Barbados	1998	1	0
Barbados	2000	6	0
Barbados	2001	3	0
Barbados	2002	3	0
Barbados	2003	5	0
Barbados	2004	4	0
Barbados	2005	3	0
Total		30	1

Scores and results list Barbados' goal tally first, score column indicates score after each Sobers goal.

List of international goals scored by Wayne Sobers
No.	Date	Venue	Cap	Opponent	Score	Result	Competition
1	28 April 1996	Barbados National Stadium, Saint Michael, Barbados	4	Jamaica	2–0	2–2 (3–4 p)	1996 Caribbean Cup qualification

== Honours ==
Notre Dame

- Barbados Premier Division: 2002, 2004, 2005, 2008; runner-up 2006; third place 2001
- Barbados FA Cup: 2004, 2008; runner-up 2002
