= Marcial Salazar =

Peruvian footballer and manager (born 1970)

Personal information
- Full name: Marcial Javier Salazar Orbe
- Date of birth: 8 September 1970 (age 56)
- Place of birth: Iquitos, Peru
- Height: 1.70 m (5 ft 7 in)
- Position: Defender

Senior career*
Years	Team	Apps	(Gls)
1986–1987	Hungaritos Agustinos		
1988	CNI		
1989–1993	San Agustín		
1994	Deportivo Municipal		
1995–2000	Alianza Lima		
2001	Universitario		
2002	Deportivo Wanka		

International career
1994–2000	Peru	7	(0)

Managerial career
- 2009: CNI (interim)
- 2010–2011: CNI
- 2012: Los Caimanes
- 2012: Defensor San Alejandro
- 2013: CNI FC
- 2014: ADA (Jaén)
- 2014–2015: Bolívar FC
- 2015–2016: Los Caimanes
- 2017: Estudiantil CNI
- 2017: FC Carlos Stein
- 2017: Los Caimanes
- 2018: ADA (Jaén)
- 2018: Atlético Torino
- 2019: Los Caimanes
- 2020: Estudiantil CNI
- 2021: Los Caimanes
- 2022: Juvenil UTC
- 2022–2023: Comerciantes FC
- 2024: Cultural Volante
- 2024: ADA (Jaén)
- 2024: Dolce Bretaña
- 2025: Deportivo Lute
- 2025: Comerciantes FC
- * Club domestic league appearances and goals

Marcial Javier Salazar Orbe (born on 8 September 1970) is a Peruvian football manager and former player.

== Playing career ==
=== Club career ===
Nicknamed El Charapa, Marcial Salazar began his career in 1986 with Hungaritos Agustinos in his hometown of Iquitos. In 1988, he joined Colegio Nacional Iquitos before moving to Lima the following year to play for San Agustín.

After a stint with Deportivo Municipal in 1994, he signed with Alianza Lima in 1995, where he achieved his best results. He won the Peruvian league title in 1997 and participated in four Copa Libertadores tournaments in 1995, 1997, 1998 and 2000 (20 matches in total, scoring one goal). On 25 August 1999, he scored the winning goal for Alianza Lima against Millonarios F.C. in the 1999 Copa Merconorte, a goal that Fox Sports voted the best on the continent that year.

He joined Universitario de Deportes in 2001 and finished his career in 2002 playing for Deportivo Wanka.

=== International career ===
Peruvian international Marcial Salazar played seven matches (no goals scored) for the national team between 1994 and 2000. He notably played in the 2000 CONCACAF Gold Cup in the United States where his country reached the semi-finals.

== Managerial career ==
Having become a coach, Marcial Salazar managed Los Caimanes on several occasions. He led them to a runner-up finish in the second division in 2015.

In 2022, he reached the Copa Perú final with Comerciantes FC of Iquitos. He was retained as manager of the club, which was then promoted to the second division in 2023.

== Honours ==
=== Player ===
Alianza Lima

- Torneo Descentralizado: 1997
