= Salvino =

Salvino is an Italian surname, created from name Salvo. Notable people with the surname include:

- Carmen Salvino (born 1933), American professional ten-pin bowler, inventor, author, and ambassador
- Mike Salvino, American business executive

== See also ==
- Salvo (disambiguation)
- Salvino (horse), a horse ridden in United States by Adrienne Lyle
- Salvini (surname)
