= 1996 Caribbean Cup =

Shell/Umbro Caribbean Cup

Tournament details
- Host country: Trinidad and Tobago
- Dates: 24 May – 7 June 1996
- Teams: 8

Final positions
- Champions: Trinidad and Tobago (5th title)
- Runners-up: Cuba
- Third place: Martinique
- Fourth place: Suriname

Tournament statistics
- Matches played: 16
- Goals scored: 42 (2.63 per match)

The 1996 Caribbean Cup, known as the Shell/Umbro Caribbean Cup for sponsorship reasons, was the 14th international association football championship for members of the Caribbean Football Union (CFU). It was the eighth edition of the Caribbean Cup which replaced the CFU Championship. Hosted by Trinidad and Tobago, the competition ran from 24 May – 7 June 1996 and was contested by the national teams of Cuba, Haiti, Jamaica, Martinique, Saint Kitts and Nevis, Saint Vincent and the Grenadines, Suriname and Trinidad and Tobago.

The final tournament began with the first matches in the group stage on 24 May 1996 and ended with the final on 7 June 1996. Hosts and two-time defending champions Trinidad and Tobago defeated Cuba 2–0 in the final to win the competition for the fifth time.

== Background ==
The Caribbean Football Union (CFU) was founded in January 1978 as a sub-confederation of the Confederation of North, Central America and Caribbean Association Football (CONCACAF). Later the same year, the first CFU Championship was organised in Trinidad and Tobago. The competition was held semi-regularly until the final edition in 1988. From 1989, it was replaced by the Caribbean Cup.

The tournament was jointly sponsored by Royal Dutch Shell and Umbro.

Trinidad and Tobago were two-time defending champions after winning the previous two editions in 1994 and 1995. Trinidad and Tobago were also the most successful team in the history of the competition after winning the trophy on four previous occasions.

== Format ==
A qualifying tournament was held to determine seven of the eight teams that would participate in the final tournament. Hosts and holders Trinidad and Tobago qualified automatically. The 18 competing teams were drawn into seven groups of two or three teams. Group two was played as a single round-robin where each team would play all of the others once. The winner of the group would qualify for the final tournament. The remaining groups were played as a series of two-legged ties. In the groups of three, one team was given a bye while the other two teams contested a two-legged tie and the team that scored the most goals on aggregate advanced to the second round. The remaining two teams contested a final two-legged tie and the team that scored the most goals on aggregate would qualify for the final tournament. In the groups of two, the teams contested one two-legged tie and the team that scored the most goals on aggregate would qualify for the final tournament.

For the final tournament, the eight teams were drawn into two groups of four teams. Each group was played as a single round-robin where each team would play all of the others once. The winners and runners-up of each group would contest the semi-finals with the winners advancing to the final and the losers contesting the third-place play-off.

=== Participants ===
- Anguilla
- Antigua and Barbuda
- Barbados
- Cayman Islands
- Cuba
- Dominica
- Dominican Republic
- French Guiana
- Guyana
- Grenada
- Haiti
- Jamaica
- Martinique
- Netherlands Antilles
- Saint Vincent and the Grenadines
- Saint Kitts and Nevis
- Saint Lucia
- Sint Maarten
- Suriname
- Trinidad and Tobago

== Qualifying tournament ==
=== Group 1 ===
The Netherlands Antilles withdrew after losing the first leg to Grenada. Saint Vincent and the Grenadines defeated Grenada to qualify for the final tournament.

Qualifying group 1
Team 1	Agg.	Team 2	1st leg	2nd leg
First round
Netherlands Antilles	0–1	Grenada	0–1	— (Note: The Netherlands Antilles withdrew after the first leg.)
Saint Vincent and the Grenadines	Bye	n/a	—	—
Second round
Grenada	2–4	Saint Vincent and the Grenadines	1–1	1–3

==== First round ====
23 March 1996

Netherlands Antilles	0–1	Grenada

Grenada	Cancelled	Netherlands Antilles

Netherlands Antilles withdrew, Grenada advanced.

==== Second round ====
24 April 1996

Grenada	1–1	Saint Vincent and the Grenadines

28 April 1996

Saint Vincent and the Grenadines	3–1	Grenada

Saint Vincent and the Grenadines won 4–2 on aggregate.

=== Group 2 ===
Qualifying group 2, held in Saint Kitts and Nevis, was played between 27 and 31 May 1996. Saint Kitts and Nevis qualified as group winners after defeating Sint Maarten 3–0 in their final match.

==== Table ====
Pos	Team	Pld	W	D	L	GF	GA	GD	Pts	Qualification
1	Saint Kitts and Nevis	2	2	0	0	11	0	+11	6	Qualification to 1996 Caribbean Cup
2	Sint Maarten	2	1	0	1	4	3	+1	3	
3	Anguilla	2	0	0	2	0	12	−12	0	

==== Results ====
27 March 1996

Saint Kitts and Nevis	8–0	Anguilla

Basseterre

29 March 1996

Sint Maarten	4–0	Anguilla

Basseterre

31 March 1996

Saint Kitts and Nevis	3–0	Sint Maarten

Basseterre

=== Group 3 ===
Haiti defeated the Dominican Republic to qualify for the final tournament.

Qualifying group 3
Team 1	Agg.	Team 2	1st leg	2nd leg
Haiti	7–1	Dominican Republic	6–0	1–1 (Note: Both legs were played in Port-au-Prince, Haiti.)

Notes:
26 April 1996

Haiti	6–0	Dominican Republic

Port-au-Prince
28 April 1996

Haiti	1–1	Dominican Republic

Port-au-Prince

Haiti won 7–1 on aggregate.

=== Group 4 ===
Cuba defeated the Cayman Islands to qualify for the final tournament.

Qualifying group 4
Team 1	Agg.	Team 2	1st leg	2nd leg
Cayman Islands	0–4	Cuba	0–4	— (Note: Second leg was not played.)

Notes:
26 April 1996

Cayman Islands	0–4	Cuba

Cuba	Not played	Cayman Islands

Second leg not played, Cuba advanced.

=== Group 5 ===
Martinique defeated Saint Lucia to qualify for the final tournament.

Qualifying group 5
Team 1	Agg.	Team 2	1st leg	2nd leg
First round
Dominica	1–2	Saint Lucia	0–1	1–1
Martinique	Bye	n/a	—	—
Second round
Martinique	2–0	Saint Lucia	1–0	1–0

==== First round ====
3 March 1996

Dominica	0–1	Saint Lucia

21 March 1996

Saint Lucia	1–1	Dominica

Saint Lucia won 2–1 on aggregate.

==== Second round ====
24 April 1996

Martinique	1–0	Saint Lucia

28 April 1996

Saint Lucia	0–1	Martinique

Martinique won 2–0 on aggregate.

=== Group 6 ===
Antigua and Barbuda withdrew. Jamaica defeated Barbados to qualify for the final tournament.

Qualifying group 6
Team 1	Agg.	Team 2	1st leg	2nd leg
Jamaica	2–2 (4–3 p)	Barbados	2–0	0–2 (a.e.t.)

24 April 1996

Jamaica	2–0	Barbados
Young 44' (pen.); Davis 89'

National Stadium, Kingston
28 April 1996

Barbados	2–0 (a.e.t.)	Jamaica
Goodridge 51'; Sobers 55' (pen.)
Penalties
	3–4

Hadley Court Stadium, Bridgetown

2–2 on aggregate. Jamaica won 4–3 on penalties.

=== Group 7 ===
Suriname defeated French Guiana and Guyana to qualify for the final tournament.

Qualifying group 5
Team 1	Agg.	Team 2	1st leg	2nd leg
First round
French Guiana	2–3	Suriname	1–2	1–1
Guyana	Bye	n/a	—	—
Second round
Suriname	3–3 (5–3 p)	Guyana	2–1	1–2 (a.e.t.)

==== First round ====
24 March 1996

French Guiana	1–2	Suriname

14 April 1996

Suriname	1–1	French Guiana

Suriname won 3–2 on aggregate.

==== Second round ====
28 April 1996

Suriname	2–1	Guyana

5 May 1996

Guyana	2–1 (a.e.t.)	Suriname
Penalties
	3–5

3–3 on aggregate. Suriname won 5–3 on penalties.

== Final tournament ==
=== Group A ===
In group A, Trinidad and Tobago advanced to the semi-finals as group winners after winning all three of their matches. Suriname also advanced as runners-up after a 1–1 draw with Saint Kitts and Nevis in their final match.

==== Table ====
Pos	Team	Pld	W	D	L	GF	GA	GD	Pts	Qualification
1	Trinidad and Tobago	3	3	0	0	9	1	+8	9	Qualification to the semi-finals
2	Suriname	3	1	1	1	4	5	−1	4	Qualification to the semi-finals
3	Jamaica	3	1	0	2	5	5	0	3	
4	Saint Kitts and Nevis	3	0	1	2	3	10	−7	1	

==== Results ====
24 May 1996

Trinidad and Tobago	1–0	Jamaica
Latapy 32'

Hasely Crawford Stadium, Port of Spain
Attendance: 5,000

26 May 1996

Jamaica	4–1	Saint Kitts and Nevis
Wright 21'; Davis 61', 72'; Palmer 87'		Grumbs 89'

Industry Park, Palo Seco
Attendance: 4,000
26 May 1996

Trinidad and Tobago	3–0	Suriname
Latapy 58', 61'; Rougier 88'

Industry Park, Palo Seco
Attendance: 6,500

28 May 1996

Suriname	3–1	Jamaica
Riedwald 6'; Boyce 7', 44'		Lowe 45'

Hasely Crawford Stadium, Port of Spain
Attendance: 7,000
28 May 1996

Trinidad and Tobago	5–1	Saint Kitts and Nevis
Latapy 21', 29', 80'; Marcelle 45'; Dwarika 81'		Bedford 79'

Hasely Crawford Stadium, Port of Spain
Attendance: 7,000

30 May 1996

Suriname	1–1	Saint Kitts and Nevis
Kasanji 54'		Riley 72'

Hasely Crawford Stadium, Port of Spain
Attendance: 2,000

=== Group B ===
In group A, Cuba advanced to the semi-finals as group winners after a goalless draw against Haiti in their final match. Martinique also advanced as runners-up after defeating Saint Vincent and the Grenadines 3–0 in their final match.

==== Table ====
Pos	Team	Pld	W	D	L	GF	GA	GD	Pts	Qualification
1	Cuba	3	2	1	0	3	0	+3	7	Qualification to the semi-finals
2	Martinique	3	2	0	1	4	1	+3	6	Qualification to the semi-finals
3	Haiti	3	0	2	1	2	3	−1	2	
4	Saint Vincent and the Grenadines	3	0	1	2	2	7	−5	1	

==== Results ====
25 May 1996

Cuba	2–0	Saint Vincent and the Grenadines
Sebrango 48'; Layola 59'

Manny Ramjohn Stadium, San Fernando
Attendance: 2,500
25 May 1996

Martinique	1–0	Haiti
Sorbert 53'

Manny Ramjohn Stadium, San Fernando
Attendance: 1,500

27 May 1996

Haiti	2–2	Saint Vincent and the Grenadines
Golman 50', 56'		Hendrickson 60', 89'

Manny Ramjohn Stadium, San Fernando
Attendance: 5,000
27 May 1996

Cuba	1–0	Martinique
Darcourt 72'

Manny Ramjohn Stadium, San Fernando
Attendance: 3,300

29 May 1996

Haiti	0–0	Cuba

Malabar Stadium, Arima
Attendance: 3,000
29 May 1996

Martinique	3–0	Saint Vincent and the Grenadines
Valide 3'; Reno 23', 34'

Malabar Stadium, Arima
Attendance: 1,000

=== Knockout stage ===
Knockout stage
Team 1	Score	Team 2
Semi-finals
Trinidad and Tobago	2–1 (asdet)	Martinique
Cuba	4–0	Suriname
Third-place play-off
Martinique	1–1 (a.e.t.) (3–2 p)	Suriname
Final
Trinidad and Tobago	2–0	Cuba

==== Semi-finals ====
Group winners Trinidad and Tobago and Cuba both advanced to the final after defeating Martinique and Suriname respectively.

3 June 1996

Trinidad and Tobago	2–1 (a.e.t.)	Martinique
John 90', 117'		Carole 88'

Hasely Crawford Stadium, Port of Spain
Attendance: 11,000
3 June 1996

Cuba	4–0	Suriname
Darcourt 35', 55'; Martínez 75'; Sotolongo 83'

Manny Ramjohn Stadium, San Fernando

==== Third-place play-off ====
Martinique defeated Suriname on penalties to finish third.

5 June 1996

Martinique	1–1 (a.e.t.)	Suriname
Rano 48'		Riedewald 76'
Penalties
	3–2

Port of Spain
Attendance: 2,000

==== Final ====
Goals from Arnold Dwarika and Jerren Nixon helped Trinidad and Tobago defeat Cuba 2–0 to win the competition for the fifth time.

7 June 1996

Trinidad and Tobago	2–0	Cuba
Dwarika; Nixon

Port of Spain
