= Sebastien Vorbe =

Haitian footballer (born 1976)

Personal information
- Date of birth: 4 June 1976 (age 50)
- Place of birth: Thomassin, Haiti
- Height: 1.78 m (5 ft 10 in)
- Position: Midfielder

College career
Years	Team	Apps	(Gls)
1997–1998	FIU Golden Panthers		

Senior career*
Years	Team	Apps	(Gls)
1995–1996	Violette		
1999–2000	Violette		
2000–2001	LA Galaxy	19	(4)
2001	Violette		

International career
1999–2000	Haiti	8	(2)
- * Club domestic league appearances and goals

Sebastien Vorbe (born 4 June 1976) is a Haitian professional footballer who played as a midfielder for Violette.

== Club career ==
Vorbe started his career playing for the First Division in the Ligue Haïtienne for the Violette AC, where he would go on to win the national championship his first year during the 1994–95 season.

After the following year, Vorbe played college soccer at Florida International University in 1997 and 1998, where he registered nine goals and 13 assists in 37 games. Following two seasons at FIU, Vorbe returned to Haiti to play with Violette AC, only to win his second national championship.

=== LA Galaxy (2000–01) ===
At age 24, Vorbe signed a one-year contract as a discovery player on 25 April 2000 to play for the Los Angeles Galaxy, arguably one of the most successful clubs of Major League Soccer. He was noticed on the international stage for Haiti during the qualifying tournament in Los Angeles and the 2000 CONCACAF Gold Cup tournament in Miami and had the opportunity to train with the club during preseason. Although players before him played in defunct American leagues, Vorbe became just the second Haitian player ever (to Patrick Tardieu), to play for the MLS since its 1993 creation. He scored his first major league goal against the defending MLS champion D.C. United leading Galaxy to a 2–1 victory. In 19 games and 915 minutes with the team, Vorbe scored four goals in ten starts, the most by four rookies on the team. A notable game was when Vorbe scored the winning goal at the 50th minute against a quality Club Atlético Talleres, that was just promoted to Argentine Primera División after an outstanding season.

In January 2001 Vorbe played in the 2000 CONCACAF Champions' Cup, where Galaxy would defeat Honduran club, Olimpia in the finals and win its first title in the competition.

Vorbe was waived on 5 March 2001.

=== Violette (2001) ===
After the CONCACAF Champions' Cup, Vorbe would again return to Violette AC, where he became a mainstay and continues to play.

== International career ==
Vorbe represented the Haiti, from 1999 to 2000. He scored Haiti's lone goal of the 2000 CONCACAF Gold Cup tournament.

== Personal life ==
He is the nephew of notable Haitian player Philippe Vorbe.

== Honours ==
Violette

- Ligue Haïtienne: 1995, 1999

Los Angeles Galaxy

- CONCACAF Champions' Cup: 2000

Haiti U17

- CFU Under-17 Championship: 2000
