= 2000 CONCACAF Gold Cup =

5th edition of the CONCACAF Gold Cup

CONCACAF Championship
- 2000 CONCACAF Gold Cup official logo

Tournament details
- Host country: United States
- Dates: February 12–27
- Teams: 12 (from 3 confederations)
- Venues: 3 (in 3 host cities)

Final positions
- Champions: Canada (1st title)
- Runners-up: Colombia

Tournament statistics
- Matches played: 19
- Goals scored: 55 (2.89 per match)
- Attendance: 695,087 (36,584 per match)
- Top scorer(s): (Canada) Carlo Corazzin (4 goals)
- Best player: (Canada) Craig Forrest
- Best young player: (Canada) Richard Hastings

The 2000 CONCACAF Gold Cup was the fifth edition of the Gold Cup, the soccer championship of North America, Central America and the Caribbean (CONCACAF), and the 15th overall CONCACAF tournament. It was held in Los Angeles, Miami, and San Diego in the United States. The format of the tournament changed from 1998; it was expanded to twelve teams, split into four groups of three. The top two teams in each group would advance to the quarter-finals. Peru and Colombia were invited from CONMEBOL, and the Republic of Korea was invited from AFC.

With all three games in Group D ending in ties and Canada tied with the Republic of Korea on every tiebreaker, a coin toss was used. Canada won and advanced to the quarter-finals. They went on to win their first and to date only Gold Cup title. In the quarter-finals, Canada upset defending champions Mexico in golden goal extra time 2–1. They defeated Trinidad and Tobago in the semi-finals 1–0 after Craig Forrest saved a first-half penalty. Already assured as CONCACAF champions, Canada topped invitees Colombia 2–0 in the final despite going into the tournament as the lowest ranked side in the FIFA World Rankings.

The tournament marks the only time a CONCACAF Gold Cup has been won by a country other than the United States or Mexico, and the only time in the tournament's history that neither the United States nor Mexico made the final, both losing in the quarterfinals.

== Venues ==
List of tournament venues
City	Stadium	Capacity	Image
Los Angeles	Los Angeles Memorial Coliseum	93,607	
San Diego	Qualcomm Stadium	70,561	
Miami	Orange Bowl	74,476	

== Teams ==
=== Qualification ===
Team	Qualification	Appearances	Last appearance	Previous best performance	FIFA Ranking
North American zone
Mexico (TH)	Automatic	5th	1998	Champions (1993,1996, 1998)	10
United States	Automatic	5th	1998	Champions (1991)	22
Canada	Playoff	4th	1996	Group Stage (1991, 1993, 1996)	80
Caribbean zone qualified through the 1998 and 1999 Caribbean Cup
Jamaica	1998 Winners	4th	1998	Third place (1993)	41
Trinidad and Tobago	1999 Winners	4th	1998	Group Stage (1991, 1996, 1998)	45
Haiti	Playoff	1st	None	Debut	77
Central American zone qualified through the 1999 UNCAF Nations Cup
Costa Rica	Winners	4th	1998	Third place (1993)	64
Guatemala	Runners-up	4th	1998	Fourth place (1996)	73
Honduras	Third place	5th	1998	Runners-up (1991)	71
Other
Colombia	Invitation	1st	None	Debut	24
Peru	Invitation	1st	None	Debut	42
South Korea	Invitation	1st	None	Debut	52

==== Qualification play-off ====
A qualification competition was held in the United States in October 1999. The following four teams competed in the playoff:

- Canada, as the lowest ranking member of the North American Football Union
- Haiti, as third place team in the 1998 Caribbean Cup
- Cuba, as runner-up in the 1999 Caribbean Cup
- El Salvador, as fourth place team in the 1999 UNCAF Nations Cup

Pos	Team	Pld	W	D	L	GF	GA	GD	Pts	Qualification
1	Canada	3	2	1	0	4	2	+2	7	Qualify for the Gold Cup
2	Haiti	3	1	1	1	3	3	0	4	Qualify for the Gold Cup
3	Cuba	3	1	1	1	3	2	+1	4	
4	El Salvador	3	0	1	2	3	6	−3	1	

October 6, 1999
18:00 (15:00 UTC−8)

Canada	0–0	Cuba
	Report

Los Angeles Memorial Coliseum, Los Angeles
Attendance: 6,583
Referee: Argelio Sabillón (Honduras)
October 6, 1999
20:00 (17:00 UTC−8)

El Salvador	1–1	Haiti
Montes 3'	Report	Descolines 80'

Los Angeles Memorial Coliseum, Los Angeles
Attendance: 6,583
Referee: Ronald Gutiérrez (Costa Rica)

October 8, 1999
18:00 (15:00 UTC−8)

Cuba	0–1	Haiti
	Report	Descolines 75'

Los Angeles Memorial Coliseum, Los Angeles
Attendance: 6,507
Referee: Mario Ramirez (Guatemala)
October 8, 1999
20:00 (17:00 UTC−8)

Canada	2–1	El Salvador
Corazzin 9'; Fletcher 59'	Report	Díaz Arce 47' (pen.); Cienfuegos (red card) 38'

Los Angeles Memorial Coliseum, Los Angeles
Attendance: 6,507
Referee: Benito Archundia (Mexico)

October 10, 1999
13:00 (10:00 UTC−8)

Canada	2–1	Haiti
Corazzin 9', 43'	Report	Descolines 48'; Thélusma (red card) 75'

Los Angeles Memorial Coliseum, Los Angeles
Attendance: 3,605
Referee: Argelio Sabillón (Honduras)
October 10, 1999
15:00 (12:00 UTC−8)

Cuba	3–1	El Salvador
Bobadilla 43'; Prado 75'; Roldán 90'	Report	Díaz Arce 63' (pen.)

Los Angeles Memorial Coliseum, Los Angeles
Attendance: 3,605
Referee: Rodrigo Badilla (Costa Rica)

=== Squads ===
The 12 national teams involved in the tournament were required to register a squad of 18 players; only players in these squads were eligible to take part in the tournament.

== Group stage ==
Tie-breaking criteria for group stage ranking
The ranking of teams in each group is determined by the points obtained in all group matches. If two or more teams are equal on points, the following criteria are used to determine the ranking:
1. Superior goal difference in all group matches;
2. Most goals scored in all group matches;
3. Coin toss.

=== Group A ===
Pos	Team	Pld	W	D	L	GF	GA	GD	Pts	Qualification
1	Honduras	2	2	0	0	4	0	+4	6	Advance to Knockout stage
2	Colombia	2	1	0	1	1	2	−1	3	Advance to Knockout stage
3	Jamaica	2	0	0	2	0	3	−3	0	

February 12, 2000
21:00 ET

Colombia	1–0	Jamaica
Martínez 15'	Report

Orange Bowl, Miami
Attendance: 49,591
Referee: Felipe Ramos (Mexico)

February 14, 2000
19:00 ET

Jamaica	0–2	Honduras
	Report	Pavón 51' (pen.); Caballero 84'

Orange Bowl, Miami
Attendance: 50,164
Referee: Mario Sánchez (Chile)

February 16, 2000
19:00 ET

Honduras	2–0	Colombia
Pavón 71'; Nuñez 78'	Report

Orange Bowl, Miami
Attendance: 36,004
Referee: Ramesh Ramdhan (Trinidad and Tobago)

=== Group B ===
Pos	Team	Pld	W	D	L	GF	GA	GD	Pts	Qualification
1	United States	2	2	0	0	4	0	+4	6	Advance to Knockout stage
2	Peru	2	0	1	1	1	2	−1	1	Advance to Knockout stage
3	Haiti	2	0	1	1	1	4	−3	1	

February 12, 2000
19:00 ET

United States	3–0	Haiti
Kirovski 18'; Wynalda 55' (pen.); Jones 89'	Report

Orange Bowl, Miami
Attendance: 49,591
Referee: Olger Mejías (Costa Rica)

February 14, 2000
21:00 ET

Haiti	1–1	Peru
Vorbe 61'	Report	Zúñiga 69'

Orange Bowl, Miami
Attendance: 23,795
Referee: Carlos Batres (Guatemala)

February 16, 2000
21:00 ET

Peru	0–1	United States
	Report	Jones 59'

Orange Bowl, Miami
Attendance: 36,004
Referee: Felipe Ramos (Mexico)

=== Group C ===
Pos	Team	Pld	W	D	L	GF	GA	GD	Pts	Qualification
1	Mexico	2	1	1	0	5	1	+4	4	Advance to Knockout stage
2	Trinidad and Tobago	2	1	0	1	4	6	−2	3	Advance to Knockout stage
3	Guatemala	2	0	1	1	3	5	−2	1	

February 13, 2000
14:00 ET

Mexico	4–0	Trinidad and Tobago
Márquez 36'; Hernández 52'; David 75' (o.g.); Palencia 85'	Report

Qualcomm Stadium, San Diego
Attendance: 22,131
Referee: Rafael Rodríguez (El Salvador)

February 15, 2000
21:00 ET

Trinidad and Tobago	4–2	Guatemala
Latapy 26'; Dwarika 36'; Nakhid 52'; Yorke 83'	Report	Plata 30'; Ramírez 47'

Los Angeles Memorial Coliseum, Los Angeles
Attendance: 23,621
Referee: Kim Young-Joo (South Korea)

February 17, 2000
19:00 ET

Guatemala	1–1	Mexico
Miranda 28'	Report	Mora 26'

Los Angeles Memorial Coliseum, Los Angeles
Attendance: 54,246
Referee: Gustavo Méndez (Uruguay)

=== Group D ===
Pos	Team	Pld	W	D	L	GF	GA	GD	Pts	Qualification
1	Costa Rica	2	0	2	0	4	4	0	2	Advance to knockout stage
2	Canada	2	0	2	0	2	2	0	2 (Note: Tied on every statistical record. A coin toss was used as the tiebreaker.)	Advance to knockout stage
3	South Korea	2	0	2	0	2	2	0	2	

Source: ESPN
Rules for classification: Group stage tiebreakers
Notes:
February 13, 2000
12:00 (9:00 UTC−8)

Costa Rica	2–2	Canada
J. Soto 11'; Wallace 54'	Report	Corazzin 19' (pen.), 57'

Qualcomm Stadium, San Diego
Attendance: 22,131
Referee: Peter Prendergast (Jamaica)

February 15, 2000
19:00 (16:00 UTC−8)

Canada	0–0	South Korea
	Report

Los Angeles Memorial Coliseum, Los Angeles
Attendance: 23,621
Referee: Brian Hall (United States)

February 17, 2000
21:00 (18:00 UTC−8)

South Korea	2–2	Costa Rica
Lee Dong-gook 14'; Lee Min-sung 75'	Report	Wanchope 66'; Medford 85'

Los Angeles Memorial Coliseum, Los Angeles
Attendance: 54,246
Referee: Argelio Sabillón (Honduras)

== Knockout stage ==
=== Bracket ===
Quarter-finals
20 February – San Diego
Costa Rica	1
Trinidad and Tobago (a.s.d.e.t.)	2
20 February – San Diego
Mexico	1
Canada (a.s.d.e.t.)	2
19 February – Miami
United States	2 (1)
Colombia (p)	2 (2)
19 February – Miami
Honduras	3
Peru	5

Semi-finals
24 February – Los Angeles
Trinidad and Tobago	0
Canada	1
23 February – San Diego
Colombia	2
Peru	1

Final
27 February – Los Angeles
Canada	2
Colombia	0

=== Quarter-finals ===
February 19, 2000
15:00

United States	2–2 (a.e.t.)	Colombia
McBride 20'; Armas 51'	Report	Asprilla 24'; Bedoya 81'
Penalties
Wynalda (penalty missed); Reyna (penalty missed); Lewis (penalty scored); Armas (penalty missed); Olsen (penalty missed)	1–2	(penalty missed) Pérez; (penalty scored) Martínez; (penalty missed) Candelo; (penalty scored) A. Mosquera

Orange Bowl, Miami
Attendance: 32,972
Referee: Carlos Batres (Guatemala)

February 19, 2000
17:30

Honduras	3–5	Peru
Clavasquín 32'; Pavón 67' (pen.); Pineda 69'	Report	Holsen 7'; J. Soto 14' (pen.); Del Solar 50'; Palacios 52'; Sáenz 87'

Orange Bowl, Miami
Attendance: 32,972
Referee: Marío Sánchez (Chile)

Match abandoned in the 88th minute of play with the score at 3–5 due to lack of security conditions.

February 20, 2000
12:00 (9:00 UTC−8)

Costa Rica	1–2 (a.e.t./g.g.)	Trinidad and Tobago
Wanchope 89'	Report	Dwarika 26'; Trotman 101'

Qualcomm Stadium, San Diego
Attendance: 18,062
Referee: Kim Young-Joo (South Korea)

February 20, 2000
14:30 (11:30 UTC−8)

Mexico	1–2 (a.e.t./g.g.)	Canada
Ramírez 35'	Report	Corazzin 83'; Hastings 92'

Qualcomm Stadium, San Diego
Attendance: 18,062
Referee: Peter Prendergast (Jamaica)

=== Semi-finals ===
February 23, 2000
20:00

Colombia	2–1	Peru
Salazar 39' (o.g.); Bonilla 53'	Report	Palacios 75'

Qualcomm Stadium, San Diego
Attendance: 3,402
Referee: Rafael Rodríguez (El Salvador)

February 24, 2000
20:00

Trinidad and Tobago	0–1	Canada
	Report	Watson 68'

Los Angeles Memorial Coliseum, Los Angeles
Attendance: 2,841
Referee: Gustavo Méndez (Uruguay)

=== Final ===
February 7, 2000
15:00 (12:00 UTC−8)

Canada	2–0	Colombia
De Vos 45'; Corazzin 68' (pen.)	Report

Memorial Coliseum, Los Angeles
Attendance: 6,197
Referee: Peter Prendergast (Jamaica)

== Statistics ==
=== Goalscorers ===
There were 55 goals scored in 19 matches, for an average of 2.89 goals per match.

4 goals

- (Canada) Carlo Corazzin

3 goals

- (Honduras) Carlos Pavón

2 goals

- (Costa Rica) Paulo Wanchope
- (Peru) Roberto Palacios
- (Trinidad and Tobago) Arnold Dwarika
- (United States) Cobi Jones

1 goal

- (Canada) Jason de Vos
- (Canada) Richard Hastings
- (Canada) Mark Watson
- (Colombia) Faustino Asprilla
- (Colombia) Gerardo Bedoya
- (Colombia) Víctor Bonilla
- (Colombia) Gonzalo Martínez
- (Costa Rica) Hernán Medford
- (Costa Rica) Jafet Soto
- (Costa Rica) Harold Wallace
- (Guatemala) Erick Miranda
- (Guatemala) Juan Carlos Plata
- (Guatemala) Guillermo Ramírez
- (Haiti) Sébastien Vorbe
- (Honduras) Samuel Caballero
- (Honduras) Reynaldo Clavasquín
- (Honduras) Milton Núñez
- (Honduras) José Luis Pineda
- (Mexico) Luis Hernández
- (Mexico) Rafael Márquez
- (Mexico) Emilio Mora
- (Mexico) Francisco Palencia
- (Mexico) Ramón Ramírez
- (Peru) José del Solar
- (Peru) Roberto Holsen
- (Peru) Waldir Sáenz
- (Peru) Jorge Soto
- (Peru) Ysrael Zúñiga
- (South Korea) Lee Dong-gook
- (South Korea) Lee Min-sung
- (Trinidad and Tobago) Russell Latapy
- (Trinidad and Tobago) David Nakhid
- (Trinidad and Tobago) Mickey Trotman
- (Trinidad and Tobago) Dwight Yorke
- (United States) Chris Armas
- (United States) Jovan Kirovski
- (United States) Brian McBride
- (United States) Eric Wynalda

1 own goal

- (Peru) Marcial Salazar (against Colombia)
- (Trinidad and Tobago) Shurland David (against Mexico)

=== Awards ===
Team of the Tournament
Goalkeeper	Defenders	Midfielders	Forwards
(Canada) Craig Forrest	(Mexico) Rafael Márquez (Canada) Jason DeVos	(Mexico) Ramón Ramírez (United States) Cobi Jones (Peru) Roberto Palacios	(Trinidad and Tobago) Russell Latapy (Trinidad and Tobago) Arnold Dwarika (Canada) Carlo Corazzin (Honduras) Carlos Pavón (Colombia) Faustino Asprilla

Player of the Tournament

The Player of the Tournament award was given to Craig Forrest.

- (Canada) Craig Forrest

Young Player of the Tournament

The award was given to Richard Hastings.

- (Canada) Richard Hastings

Top Scorer

Carlo Corazzin won the award with four goals scored in the tournament.

- (Canada) Carlo Corazzin (4 goals)
