= Garfield Gonsalves =

Antigua and Barbudan footballer

Personal information
- Full name: Garfield Gonsalves
- Date of birth: 11 September 1972 (age 54)
- Place of birth: Antigua and Barbuda
- Position: Centre back

Team information
- Current team: Villa Lions

Senior career*
Years	Team	Apps	(Gls)
2004–2011	Villa Lions		

International career^{‡}
1992–2008	Antigua and Barbuda	28+	(7+)
- * Club domestic league appearances and goals as of 12:29, 24 May 2008 (UTC) ‡ National team caps and goals as of 30 December 2008

Garfield Gonsalves (born 2 September 1972) is an Antiguan and Barbudan footballer, currently playing for Villa Lions.

== International career ==
Nicknamed Garry, the versatile Gonsalves is a veteran with the national team, making his debut for Antigua and Barbuda in an April 1992 World Cup qualification match against the Netherlands Antilles and has earned over 25 caps since. He played in 11 World Cup qualification games.

In 2006 Gonsalves also became head coach of the Antigua and Barbuda U-16 national team.

== National team statistics ==
Antigua and Barbuda national team
Year	Apps	Goals
1992	2	0
1993	1	1
1994		
1995	4	4
1996		
1997		
1998	1	1
1999		
2000	6	0
2001	0	0
2002	0	0
2003	0	0
2004	4	2
2005	0	0
2006	0	0
2007	0	0
2008	11	0
Total		
