= Osmín Hernández =

Cuban footballer (born 1972)

Personal information
- Full name: Osmín Hernández Hernández
- Date of birth: 15 July 1972 (age 54)
- Place of birth: Pinar del Río, Cuba
- Positions: Attacking midfielder; striker

Senior career*
Years	Team	Apps	(Gls)
1990–2006	Pinar del Río		
1998–1999	→ Bonner SC (loan)	2	(0)
2005	→ Fløy (loan)	16	(0)

International career^{‡}
1995–2004	Cuba	46	(12)
- * Club domestic league appearances and goals ‡ National team caps and goals as of 1 January 2018

Osmín Hernández Hernández (born 15 July 1972) is a Cuban retired footballer.

== Club career ==
Hernández played his entire career for local side Pinar del Río, except for half a season in Germany with Bonner SC, when then Cuban leader Fidel Castro approved for the whole Cuban team to join the German 4th level side for part of the 1998/99 season. He also had a trial with Olympique Marseille along with compatriot Lázaro Darcourt in 1998, only for a Cuban official to prevent them to sign professional terms. Then, he had a season in the Norwegian third tier with Fløy alongside another Cuban, Serguei Prado. Back in Cuba, he was the league's top goalscorer in 1996 and 1997.

== International career ==
One of the leading players of the Cuban team during the 1990s, he made his international debut for Cuba in 1995 and has earned a total of 46 caps, scoring 12 goals. He represented his country in 18 FIFA World Cup qualification matches (1 goal) and was a non-playing squad member at the 1998 CONCACAF Gold Cup.

His final international was a June 2004 World Cup qualification match against Costa Rica.

=== International goals ===
Scores and results list Cuba's goal tally first.

Number	Date	Location	Opponent	Score	Result	Competition
1	23 May 1995	Estadio Quisqueya, Santo Domingo, Dominican Republic	Netherlands Antilles		3-0	1995 Caribbean Cup qualification
2	23 May 1995	Estadio Quisqueya, Santo Domingo, Dominican Republic	Netherlands Antilles		3-0	1995 Caribbean Cup qualification
3	25 May 1995	Estadio Quisqueya, Santo Domingo, Dominican Republic	Dominican Republic	3-0	3-0	1995 Caribbean Cup qualification
4	27 May 1995	Estadio Quisqueya, Santo Domingo, Dominican Republic	Puerto Rico		9-0	1995 Caribbean Cup qualification
5	27 May 1995	Estadio Quisqueya, Santo Domingo, Dominican Republic	Puerto Rico		9-0	1995 Caribbean Cup qualification
6	27 May 1995	Estadio Quisqueya, Santo Domingo, Dominican Republic	Puerto Rico		9-0	1995 Caribbean Cup qualification
7	21 July 1995	Jarrett Park, Montego Bay, Jamaica	Jamaica		2-1	1995 Caribbean Cup
8	27 July 1995	Grand Cayman, Cayman Islands	Saint Vincent and the Grenadines	1-0	2-3	1995 Caribbean Cup
9	28 August 1996	Estadio Morazán, San Pedro Sula, Honduras	Honduras	1-2	2-2	Friendly match
10	2 April 2000	Estadio Pedro Marrero, Havana, Cuba	Suriname	1-0	1-0	2002 FIFA World Cup qualification
11	24 June 2001	Belize City, Belize	Belize	1-0	2-3	Friendly match
