= Eric Jean-Louis =

Haitian painter

Eric Jean-Louis (born 1957) is a Haitian painter. Born in Jérémie, Jean-Louis has received several awards in Haiti for his paintings. His works have been exhibited in the United States, Guadeloupe, Denmark, Curaçao, Switzerland, and France beginning in 1977.
