= Austin Huggins =

Kittian footballer (born 1970)

Personal information
- Date of birth: 19 January 1970 (age 56)
- Place of birth: Basseterre, Saint Kitts and Nevis
- Position: Midfielder

Team information
- Current team: Saint Kitts and Nevis (assistant manager)

Senior career*
Years	Team	Apps	(Gls)
1999	Bohemians	4	(0)
2000–2012	Garden Hotspurs		

International career
1993–2004	Saint Kitts and Nevis	36	(11)

Managerial career
- 2018–2022: Garden Hotspurs
- 2022–2023: Saint Kitts and Nevis
- 2023–: Saint Kitts and Nevis (assistant)
- * Club domestic league appearances and goals

Austin Huggins (born 19 January 1970) is a Kittitian football manager and former player who last served as assistant coach for the Saint Kitts and Nevis national team.

== Club career ==
In 1999, Huggins joined Irish club Bohemians, making four appearances for the club in the League of Ireland Premier Division. In 2000, Huggins returned to his native Saint Kitts and Nevis, signing for Garden Hotspurs. Huggins played for the club until 2012.

== International career ==
On 2 April 1993, Huggins made his debut for Saint Kitts and Nevis, scoring in a 5–1 win against the British Virgin Islands. In total, Huggins made 36 appearances for Saint Kitts and Nevis, scoring eleven times.

== Managerial career ==
In 2018, Huggins was appointed manager of former club Garden Hotspurs. In January 2022, Huggins was appointed manager of Saint Kitts and Nevis.

== Career statistics ==
Scores and results list Saint Kitts and Nevis' goal tally first.

#	Date	Venue	Opponent	Score	Result	Competition
1	2 April 1993	Warner Park Sporting Complex, Basseterre, Saint Kitts and Nevis	British Virgin Islands	1–1	5–1	1993 CONCACAF Gold Cup qualification group 5
2	28 May 1993	Montego Bay, Jamaica	Martinique	1–1	1–1	1993 CONCACAF Gold Cup qualification semi-final
3	30 May 1993	Independence Park, Kingston, Jamaica	Trinidad and Tobago	2–3	2–3	1993 CONCACAF Gold Cup qualification third-place play-off
4	30 April 1995	Warner Park Sporting Complex, Basseterre, Saint Kitts and Nevis	Antigua and Barbuda		1–1	1995 Caribbean Cup group 5
5	1 April 1998	Warner Park Sporting Complex, Basseterre, Saint Kitts and Nevis	British Virgin Islands	3–0	4–0	1998 Caribbean Cup group 3
6	3 April 1998	Warner Park Sporting Complex, Basseterre, Saint Kitts and Nevis	Dominica		1–2	1998 Caribbean Cup group 3
7	21 March 2000	Warner Park Sporting Complex, Basseterre, Saint Kitts and Nevis	Turks and Caicos Islands		6–0	2002 FIFA World Cup qualification
8	21 March 2000	Warner Park Sporting Complex, Basseterre, Saint Kitts and Nevis	Turks and Caicos Islands		6–0	2002 FIFA World Cup qualification
9	18 May 2001	Marvin Lee Stadium, Macoya, Trinidad and Tobago	Cuba	1–0	1–1	2001 Caribbean Cup group 2
10	20 May 2001	Larry Gomes Stadium, Malabar, Trinidad and Tobago	Suriname	2–0	4–0	2001 Caribbean Cup group 2
11	28 February 2004	Lionel Roberts Park, Charlotte Amalie, United States Virgin Islands	U.S. Virgin Islands	1–0	4–0	2006 FIFA World Cup qualification
