= Dexter Brown =

British impressionist painter

- Born: 19 December 1942 (age 82); Middlesex, England
- Occupation: Painter

Dexter Brown (born 1942) is a British impressionist painter. He is best known for painting racing cars as well as portraits of celebrities.

== Early life ==
Dexter Brown was born on 19 December 1942 in Middlesex, England. He was educated at the Harrow School of Art.

== Career ==
He started his career by working in advertising. In 1978, he quit his day job and started painting live music bands at the Electric Ballroom on Camden High Street in London. Three years later, by 1981, he designed the album covers and stage costumes of pop singer Toyah Willcox. He then served as an artist-in-residence at the Duke of York Theatre, when he did the portraits of Al Pacino, Glenda Jackson and Billy Connolly. He has also done portraits of Nicole Kidman, Billie Piper and Angelina Jolie.

An auction of his work at Bonhams in London on 27 February 2015 was held as a fundraiser for Combat Stress.
