= Daniel Garrido =

Spanish association football player

Personal information
- Full name: Daniel Garrido Peña
- Date of birth: 19 January 2000 (age 26)
- Place of birth: Logroño, Spain
- Height: 1.70 m (5 ft 7 in)
- Position: Midfielder

Team information
- Current team: Algeciras
- Number: 10

Youth career
- Valvanera
- 2012–2018: Real Sociedad

Senior career*
Years	Team	Apps	(Gls)
2018–2019	Real Sociedad C	30	(10)
2019–2023	Real Sociedad B	77	(6)
2023–2024	Logroñés	25	(0)
2024–2025	Real Unión	33	(5)
2025–	Algeciras	34	(4)
- * Club domestic league appearances and goals as of 10 June 2026

Daniel Garrido Peña (born 19 January 2000) is a Spanish professional footballer who plays as a central midfielder for Primera Federación club Algeciras.

== Club career ==
Born in Logroño, La Rioja, Garrido joined Real Sociedad's youth setup in 2012, from Valvanera CD. He made his senior debut with the C-team on 25 August 2018 by starting in a 2–0 Tercera División away win against SD San Pedro, and scored his first goals on 20 October after netting a brace in a 3–3 home draw against JD Somorrostro.

Garrido was promoted to the reserves ahead of the 2019–20 season, and featured regularly as his side returned to Segunda División after 59 years in 2021. He made his professional debut on 14 August 2021, starting in a 1–0 home win over CD Leganés.

On 13 July 2024, Garrido signed a one-year contract with Real Unión.
