= Mickey Trotman =

Trinidadian footballer (1974–2001)

Personal information
- Date of birth: 21 October 1974
- Place of birth: Trinidad and Tobago
- Date of death: 1 October 2001 (aged 26)
- Place of death: Port of Spain, Trinidad and Tobago
- Position: Midfielder

Youth career
- 1993–1996: University of Mobile

Senior career*
Years	Team	Apps	(Gls)
1997	NO Riverboat Gamblers		
1998	Dallas Burn	27	(6)
1999	Miami Fusion	3	(0)
2000	Joe Public	?	(1)
2001	Rochester Rhinos	11	(0)

International career
1999–2001	Trinidad and Tobago	26	(5)
- * Club domestic league appearances and goals

Mickey Trotman (21 October 1974 – 1 October 2001) was a Trinidadian professional footballer who played as a midfielder in the United States with the Dallas Burn, the Miami Fusion and the Rochester Rhinos, as well as representing the Trinidad and Tobago national team. He died in a car crash in Port of Spain on 1 October 2001, at the age of 26.

== Club career ==
In 1997, Trotman played several late season games with the New Orleans Riverboat Gamblers, a minor league team associated with the Dallas Burn. In 1998, he moved to the Burn.

== International career ==
Mickey made his international debut for the Trinidad and Tobago national team on 6 May 1999, in a Friendly match against South Africa, scoring on his debut in the 24th minute. His most famous goal for T&T was in the 2000 CONCACAF Gold Cup Finals when he scored the Golden goal in the quarterfinals against Costa Rica to send T&T through to the semifinals. His last appearance for T&T before his death was a 2002 FIFA World Cup Qualification match against Mexico on 5 September 2001, when he came on as a 45th-minute substitute. His international career ended with 26 caps and 5 goals

== Death ==
He died in a motor vehicle accident, along with his wife and brother.
