= Horace Stoute =

Barbadian footballer (born 1971)

Personal information
- Date of birth: 29 May 1971 (age 55)
- Place of birth: Barbados
- Position: Goalkeeper

Senior career*
Years	Team	Apps	(Gls)
1990–1994	Lambada		
1994–1996	Livingston	15	(0)
2001–2003	Haynesville United		
2004–2005	Ellerton United		

International career
1992–2003	Barbados	28	(0)
- * Club domestic league appearances and goals

Horace Stoute (born 29 May 1971) is a former Barbadian international footballer who played as a goalkeeper. He had a brief spell in the Scottish Football League with Livingston, playing 15 league matches for the club between 1994 and 1996.

== Club career ==
In 1994, Stoute had a trial with Scottish side Meadowbank Thistle along with his countrymen, David Alleyne, Llewellyn Riley and Wayne Sobers. Due to work permit restrictions, Thistle could only sign two of the Barbadians they had on trial. The club signed Alleyne and Stoute on permanent deals, and the other players left Scotland without a contact.

After leaving Livingston, Stoute returned to his home country to play football before retiring and moving into coaching roles with the Barbados national football team and several domestic clubs.

== Career statistics ==
=== International ===
Appearances and goals by national team and year
National team	Year	Apps	Goals
Barbados	1992	1	0
Barbados	1993	2	0
Barbados	1996	5	0
Barbados	1998	1	0
Barbados	2000	13	0
Barbados	2001	2	0
Barbados	2002	3	0
Barbados	2003	1	0
Total		28	0
