= Ariel Álvarez =

Cuban footballer (born 1973)

Personal information
- Full name: Ariel Álvarez Leyva
- Date of birth: 9 May 1973 (age 53)
- Place of birth: Caibarién, Cuba
- Position: Midfielder

Senior career*
Years	Team	Apps	(Gls)
1993–1998	Villa Clara		
1999	Bonner SC	1	(1)
1999–2010	Villa Clara		

International career
1995–2001	Cuba	53	(8)

Managerial career
- 2012–: Villa Clara
- * Club domestic league appearances and goals

Ariel Álvarez Leyva (born 9 May 1973) is a Cuban retired footballer who played at international levels, as a midfielder.

== Club career ==
Álvarez played his entire career for local side Villa Clara, except for half a season in Germany with Bonner SC, when then Cuban leader Fidel Castro approved for the whole Cuban team to join the German 4th level side for part of the 1998/99 season.

== International career ==
He played at the 1989 FIFA U-16 World Championship and made his senior international debut for Cuba in 1995 and has earned a total of 53 caps, scoring 8 goals. He represented his country in 16 FIFA World Cup qualifying matches.

His final international was an August 2001 CONCACAF Gold Cup qualification match against Panama.

=== International goals ===
Scores and results list Cuba's goal tally first.

Number	Date	Location	Opponent	Score	Result	Competition
1	25 May 1995	Estadio Quisqueya, Santo Domingo, Dominican Republic	Dominican Republic	2-0	3-0	1995 Caribbean Cup qualification
2	21 July 1995	Jarrett Park, Montego Bay, Jamaica	Jamaica		2-1	1995 Caribbean Cup
3	4 June 1999	Marvin Lee Stadium, Macoya, Tunapuna–Piarco, Trinidad and Tobago	Haiti	2-1	3-1	1999 Caribbean Cup
4	8 June 1999	Marvin Lee Stadium, Macoya, Tunapuna–Piarco, Trinidad and Tobago	Saint Kitts and Nevis	1-0	2-0	1999 Caribbean Cup
5	8 June 1999	Marvin Lee Stadium, Macoya, Tunapuna–Piarco, Trinidad and Tobago	Saint Kitts and Nevis	2-0	2-0	1999 Caribbean Cup
6	10 June 1999	Hasely Crawford Stadium, Port of Spain, Trinidad and Tobago	Jamaica	2-0	2-0	1999 Caribbean Cup
7	5 March 2000	Estadio Pedro Marrero, Havana, Cuba	Cayman Islands	2-0	4-0	2002 FIFA World Cup qualification
8	4 April 2001	Uitvlugt Community Centre, Uitvlugt, Guyana	Dominica	1-0	3-1	2001 Caribbean Cup

== Managerial career ==
After retiring as a player, Álvarez became coach of Villa Clara.
