= Manuel Bobadilla =

Cuban footballer

Personal information
- Full name: Manuel Bobadilla González
- Date of birth: June 27, 1970 (age 56)
- Place of birth: Havana, Cuba
- Position: Attacking midfielder

Senior career*
Years	Team	Apps	(Gls)
1990–2001	Ciudad La Habana		
1998–1999	→ Bonner SC (loan)	2	(0)
2005	Ciudad La Habana		

International career^{‡}
1995–2001	Cuba	57	(11)
- * Club domestic league appearances and goals ‡ National team caps and goals as of 1 January 2018

Manuel Bobadilla González (born 27 June 1970) is a Cuban retired footballer.

== Club career ==
Regarded as the best Cuban player at the end of the 1990s, Bobadilla played his entire career for local side Ciudad La Habana, except for half a season in Germany with Bonner SC, when then Cuban leader Fidel Castro approved for the whole Cuban team to join the German 4th level side for part of the 1998/99 season. After retiring from football in 2001 due to coach Miguel Company ruling him out for the national team, he returned to play for Ciudad la Habana in the 2005 season.

== International career ==
He made his international debut for Cuba in 1995 and has earned a total of 57 caps, scoring 11 goals. He represented his country in 13 FIFA World Cup qualification matches (1 goal) and played at the 1998 CONCACAF Gold Cup.

His final international was an August 2001 Gold Cup qualification play-off match against Panama.

=== International goals ===
Scores and results list Cuba's goal tally first.

Number	Date	Location	Opponent	Score	Result	Competition
1	27 May 1995	Estadio Quisqueya, Santo Domingo, Dominican Republic	Puerto Rico		9-0	1995 Caribbean Cup qualification
2	27 May 1995	Estadio Quisqueya, Santo Domingo, Dominican Republic	Puerto Rico		9-0	1995 Caribbean Cup qualification
3	30 July 1995	Grand Cayman, Cayman Islands	Cayman Islands	1-0	3-0	1995 Caribbean Cup
4	22 September 1996	Estadio Rommel Fernández, Panama City, Panama	Panama	3-1	3-1	1998 FIFA World Cup qualification
5	5 May 1999	National Stadium, Devonshire, Bermuda	Cayman Islands		4-1	1999 Caribbean Cup qualification
6	5 May 1999	National Stadium, Devonshire, Bermuda	Cayman Islands		4-1	1999 Caribbean Cup qualification
7	10 October 1999	Los Angeles Memorial Coliseum, Los Angeles, United States	El Salvador	1-0	3-1	2000 CONCACAF Gold Cup qualification
8	4 April 2001	Uitvlugt Community Centre, Uitvlugt, Guyana	Dominica	3-1	3-1	2001 Caribbean Cup
9	10 June 2001	National Stadium, Kingston, Jamaica	Jamaica	1-3	1-4	Friendly match
