= Salvo (given name) =

Salvo is the given name of:

== People ==
- Salvo Andò (born 1945), Italian academic and politician
- Salvo Cuccia (born 1960), Italian cinema director and screenwriter
- Salvo D'Acquisto (1920–1943), Italian Carabinieri who sacrificed himself to save 22 civilians from a German firing squad
- Salvatore Lima (1928–1992), Italian politician murdered by the Mafia; often referred to as Salvo Lima
- Salvatore Salvo Randone (1906–1991), Italian actor
- Salvo Vitale (1943–2025), Italian poet and writer

== Fictional characters ==
- Salvo (G.I. Joe), in the G.I. Joe universe
- Salvo Montalbano, a detective in Andrea Camilleri's series of novels and short stories

== See also ==
- Salvatore
