= Lázaro Darcourt =

Cuban footballer

Personal information
- Full name: Lázaro Darcourt Martínez
- Date of birth: April 25, 1971 (age 55)
- Place of birth: Candelaria, Cuba
- Position: Attacking midfielder

Senior career*
Years	Team	Apps	(Gls)
1989–2003	Pinar del Río		
1998–1999	Bonner SC	1	(0)

International career^{‡}
1995–2003	Cuba	73	(21)
- * Club domestic league appearances and goals ‡ National team caps and goals as of 1 January 2018

Lázaro Darcourt Martínez, sometimes spelled as Lázaro Dalcourt (born 25 April 1971) is a Cuban retired footballer.

== Club career ==
Nicknamed el Pindi, Darcourt played his entire career for local side Pinar del Río, except for half a season in Germany with Bonner SC, when then Cuban leader Fidel Castro approved for the whole Cuban team to join the German 4th level side for part of the 1998/99 season. He also had a one month-trial with Olympique Marseille along with compatriot Osmín Hernández in 1998, only for a Cuban official to prevent him to sign professional terms.

Born in Candelaria, then in Pinar del Río Province, he won 5 Cuban league titles and was voted Cuban footballer of the year in 1991, 1992 and 1995.

== International career ==
One of the leading players of the Cuban team during the 1990s, he made his international debut for Cuba in 1995 and has earned a total of 73 caps, scoring 21 goals. He represented his country in 15 FIFA World Cup qualification matches (6 goals) and played at 3 CONCACAF Gold Cup final tournaments.

His final international was a July 2003 CONCACAF Gold Cup match against the United States, quitting international football due to a persistent knee injury.

=== International goals ===
Scores and results list Cuba's goal tally first.

Number	Date	Location	Opponent	Score	Result	Competition
1	23 July 1995	National Stadium, Kingston, Jamaica	Saint Lucia	1-0	2-0	1995 Caribbean Cup
2	23 July 1995	National Stadium, Kingston, Jamaica	Saint Lucia	2-0	2-0	1995 Caribbean Cup
3	30 July 1995	Grand Cayman, Cayman Islands	Cayman Islands	1-0	3-0	1995 Caribbean Cup
4	12 May 1996	Truman Bodden Sports Complex, George Town, Cayman Islands	Cayman Islands	1-0	1-0	1998 FIFA World Cup qualification
5	14 May 1996	Truman Bodden Sports Complex, George Town, Cayman Islands	Cayman Islands	3-0	5-0	1998 FIFA World Cup qualification
6	14 May 1996	Truman Bodden Sports Complex, George Town, Cayman Islands	Cayman Islands	4-0	5-0	1998 FIFA World Cup qualification
7	27 May 1996	Manny Ramjohn Stadium, San Fernando, Trinidad and Tobago	Martinique	1-0	1-0	1996 Caribbean Cup
8	3 June 1996	Manny Ramjohn Stadium, San Fernando, Trinidad and Tobago	Suriname	1-0	4-0	1996 Caribbean Cup
9	3 June 1996	Manny Ramjohn Stadium, San Fernando, Trinidad and Tobago	Suriname	2-0	4-0	1996 Caribbean Cup
10	23 June 1996	Hasely Crawford Stadium, Port of Spain, Trinidad and Tobago	Haiti	3-0	6-1	1998 FIFA World Cup qualification
11	23 June 1996	Hasely Crawford Stadium, Port of Spain, Trinidad and Tobago	Haiti	4-0	6-1	1998 FIFA World Cup qualification
12	23 June 1996	Hasely Crawford Stadium, Port of Spain, Trinidad and Tobago	Haiti	5-0	6-1	1998 FIFA World Cup qualification
13	5 May 1999	National Stadium, Devonshire, Bermuda	Cayman Islands	1-0	4-1	1999 Caribbean Cup qualification
14	27 November 2002	Truman Bodden Sports Complex, George Town, Cayman Islands	Cayman Islands	4-0	5-0	2003 CONCACAF Gold Cup qualification
15	29 November 2002	Truman Bodden Sports Complex, George Town, Cayman Islands	Martinique	2-1	2-1	2003 CONCACAF Gold Cup qualification
16	26 March 2003	Hasely Crawford Stadium, Port of Spain, Trinidad and Tobago	Guadeloupe	2-0	3-2	2003 CONCACAF Gold Cup qualification
