= Dr. João Havelange Centre of Excellence =

- Founder: Jack Warner
- Established: 1998
- Owner: Disputed
- Location: Macoya, Trinidad and Tobago
- Coordinates: 10.64131°N 61.38368°W
- Website: http://www.coetnt.com

The Dr. João Havelange Centre of Excellence is a football academy and development suite in Macoya in Trinidad and Tobago. It is named after João Havelange, the former President of FIFA and the Brazilian Football Confederation.

The centre was the idea of long-time Trinidadian MP and CONCACAF President (1990–2011) Jack Warner. The company was registered in October 1996, during FIFA President João Havelange's reign. A second company was registered with the same name in July 1999.

The centre was funded by CONCACAF's development money for a four-year presidential term and also required funding from FIFA. It was first used in 1998 (officially opening in December 1999) and is CONCACAF's only development centre.

Warner said that the centre is named after João Havelange for agreeing to fund the development.

The development, despite being paid for by football bodies, was registered in the name of two Warner-owned companies.

In 2001, a FIFA goal programme, headed by Warner, invested $400k in an indoor facility at the site; in addition FIFA provided a further $100k in a futsal-related 'special fund' and CONCACAF raised $143k. Four years later, a second FIFA goal programme, again headed by Warner invested a further $400k for a new artificial pitch.

== Facilities ==
- Garden sanctuary – used for weddings and corporate functions
- André Kamperveen Hall
- Ken Galt Hall
- Guillermo Cañedo Hall – used for concerts and trade shows
- Joseph Blatter Hall – used for concerts and trade shows
- Marvin Lee Stadium – outdoor football stadium
- A swimming complex with two outdoor pools, a 25-metre pool, and a 12-metre pool
- Le Sportel Inn – 44-room hotel
- The Nelson Mandela Room – conference room

== Controversy ==
Investigative journalist Lasana Liburd reported that Warner owned the Centre of Excellence through two companies; CCAM and Company, and Renraw Investments. Warner and his wife, Maureen, are listed as directors for both companies. Also, the land upon which the Centre of Excellence was built, is also owned by Warner. Ownership was transferred to him and Renraw Investments from businessman and Trinidad's Guardian newspaper owner Anthony Norman Sabga and FirstCaribbean International Bank director Michael Kelvin Mansoo in October 1998.

On 18 September 1998, Renraw Investments and CCAM and Company took out a $2 million mortgage with First Citizens Bank and the Centre of Excellence was listed as a borrower along with Renraw Investments, CCAM and Company, and Jack Warner. CONCACAF's signatory was Harold Taylor, then CONCACAF assistant secretary and CFU general secretary.

On 4 June 2007, Jack Warner and Lisle Austin co-signed an $11 million mortgage allowing Warner to borrow against the value of the "Centre of Excellence". Austin Lisle, the Barbados Football Association President and CONCACAF vice-president later claimed that he had only signed the contract and was not a beneficiary of borrowed funds.

Another loan was made by a political supporter of Jack Warner's UNC party, Krishna Lalla and his company Real Time Systems Ltd. Lalla filed a lawsuit in 2011 claiming he was owed $28.1 million TTD and the lawsuit shown that one of companies secured against was the Centre of Excellence.

In May 2012, FIFA President Sepp Blatter stated that FIFA would attempt to retrieve control of the centre through legal means. Warner denied that he is owner. Warner says that the Caribbean Football Union are the owners of the centre.

Jeffrey Webb, the CONCACAF and Cayman Islands Football Association President said that he was "shell-shocked, dismayed and upset" at the revelations.
