= Patrick Tardieu =

Haitian footballer (born 1968)

Personal information
- Date of birth: 9 June 1968 (age 58)
- Place of birth: Haiti
- Position: Forward

Senior career*
Years	Team	Apps	(Gls)
- Violette AC
1993–1996	Fort Lauderdale Strikers	12	(3)
1996	New England Revolution	5	(0)
1996	Cape Cod Crusaders		(1)
1997	Florida Strikers		(2)
1998	Miami Breakers		(6)
1999	Atlanta Silverbacks	1	(0)
2001–2002	Violette AC	1	(0)

International career
1992-2002	Haiti	9	(1)
- * Club domestic league appearances and goals

Patrick Tardieu (born 9 June 1968) is a Haitian former professional footballer who played as a forward.

== Career ==
The younger brother of author Jerry, Tardieu signed for Haitian club Violette at the age of 16 before going to live with his diplomat uncle in Belgium, where he played for a lower league team.

For 1996, he signed for American top flight side New England Revolution, becoming the first Haitian to play in the newly-formed Major League Soccer. From there, Tardieu almost sealed a move to Argentinean top flight team San Lorenzo de Almagro but was unable to join because they filled their foreign player quota. After that, while captaining the Haiti national team, he played for Cape Cod Crusaders, Florida Strikers, Miami Breakers and Atlanta Silverbacks in the American lower leagues.

Following retirement, he established a business to help Haitian players ply their trade abroad.
