= David Alleyne (footballer) =

Barbadian footballer (born 1972)

Dave Alleyne
Personal information
- Full name: David Ricardo Alleyne
- Date of birth: 15 February 1972 (age 54)
- Place of birth: Barbados
- Position: Midfielder

Youth career
- Lambada

Senior career*
Years	Team	Apps	(Gls)
1994–1995	Meadowbank Thistle	5	(0)
1995–1998	Livingston	45	(3)
1998	Silver Sands		

International career
1990–1996	Barbados	6	(0)
- * Club domestic league appearances and goals

David Ricardo Alleyne (born 15 February 1972) is a Barbadian footballer who played as a midfielder for Livingston.

== Club career ==
Alleyne began his career playing for Lambada in his native Barbados.

In 1994, he moved to Scotland along with compatriot Horace Stoute and signed for Meadowbank Thistle after a successful trial period. Alleyne made five appearances for the club.

He remained with the club as they relocated and were renamed Livingston in 1995. He made 45 appearances for Livingston and scored 3 goals.

In 1998, he returned to Barbados to play for Silver Sands.

== International career ==
Alleyne was called up to represent Barbados on several occasions and was capped six times. He debuted in the 1–0 friendly loss against Jamaica on 18 March 1990, and he represented Barbados during 1994 and 1998 FIFA World Cup qualification.

== Career statistics ==
=== International ===
Appearances and goals by national team and year
National team	Year	Apps	Goals
Barbados	1990	1	0
Barbados	1992	1	0
Barbados	1996	4	0
Total		6	0
