= 2024–25 Aruban Division di Honor =

2024–25 season Aruban Division di Honor

Aruban Division di Honor
- Season: 2024–25
- Dates: 27 September 2024 - 21 June 2025
- Champions: Britannia; 6th title
- Promoted: Bubali, Sporting
- Relegated: Jong Aruba, Unistars
- 2025 CFU Club Shield: Britannia
- Matches: 144 Matches
- Top goalscorer: (Colombia) Jhon Silva (20 goals)
- Biggest home win: RCA 10–1 Unistars
- Biggest away win: Unistars 1–12 United
- Highest scoring: Unistars 1–12 United

The 2024–25 Aruban Division di Honor is the 64th season of the Division di Honor, the top division football competition in Aruba. The season ran from 27 September 2024 until 21 June 2025.

== Teams ==
=== Stadiums and locations ===
Club	Location	Venue	Capacity	2023–24 position
Britannia	Piedra Plat	Franklyn Bareño Sports Complex	1,000	2nd
Dakota	Oranjestad	Guillermo P. Trinidad Stadium	2,500	1st
Nacional	Palm Beach	Deportivo Nacional Stadium	1,000	5rd
Estrella	Santa Cruz	Estrella Stadium	1,000	6th
Bubali	Noord	Bubali Stadium	1,000	8
La Fama	Savaneta	La Fama Stadium	1,100	7th
RCA	Oranjestad	Guillermo P. Trinidad Stadium	2,500	3th
River Plate	Oranjestad	Guillermo P. Trinidad Stadium	2,500	4th
Santa Fe	Pavilla Meiveld	Santa Fe Stadium	500	9
Caiquetio	Paradera	Caiquetio Stadium	800	10

== Regular season ==
=== League table ===
Pos	Team	Pld	W	D	L	GF	GA	GD	Pts	Promotion, qualification or relegation
1	RCA	9	7	2	0	32	10	+22	23	Qualification for Caya 6
2	Britannia	9	7	2	0	27	5	+22	23	Qualification for Caya 6
3	Dakota	9	6	2	1	32	9	+23	20	Qualification for Caya 6
4	La Fama	9	5	1	3	23	10	+13	16	Qualification for Caya 6
5	Nacional	9	4	1	4	21	11	+10	13	Qualification for Caya 6
6	Estrella	9	4	1	4	20	16	+4	13	Qualification for Caya 6
7	River Plate	9	4	1	4	21	18	+3	13	Qualification for Silver League (2A/2B)
8	United	9	1	1	7	12	31	−19	4	Qualification for Silver League (2A/2B)
9	Jong Aruba	9	1	1	7	8	38	−30	4	Qualification for Silver League (2A/2B)
10	Unistars	9	0	0	9	4	52	−48	0	Qualification for Silver League (2A/2B)

Source: Soccerway

=== Results ===
Home \ Away	BRI	DAK	NAC	EST	JAR	LAF	RCA	RPL	UST	UTD
Britannia	—	2–0	3–2	0–0	4–0	2–1	1–1	3–0	8–0	4–1
Dakota	0–2	—	2–2	4–1	5–0	3–1	2–2	4–0	7–1	5–0
Nacional	2–3	2–2	—	0–1	4–1	0–2	0–2	2–0	3–0	8–0
Estrella	0–0	1–4	1–0	—	6–0	1–4	2–3	3–2	4–1	3–1
Jong Aruba	0–4	0–5	1–4	0–6	—	1–5	0–7	2–5	2–0	2–2
La Fama	1–2	1–3	2–0	4–1	5–1	—	1–2	1–1	4–0	4–0
RCA	1–1	2–2	2–0	3–2	7–0	2–1	—	2–1	10–1	3–2
River Plate	0–3	0–4	0–2	3–2	5–2	1–1	1–2	—	9–1	2–1
Unistars	0–8	1–7	0–3	1–4	0–2	0–4	1–10	1–9	—	0–5
United	1–4	0–5	0–8	1–3	2–2	0–4	2–3	1–2	5–0	—

Updated to match(es) played on 16 March 2025. Source:
Legend: Blue = home team win; Yellow = draw; Red = away team win.
For upcoming matches, an "a" indicates there is an article about the rivalry between the two participants.

== Play-Offs Caya 6 ==
=== League table ===
Pos	Team	Pld	W	D	L	GF	GA	GD	Pts	Promotion, qualification or relegation
1	Britannia	10	7	3	0	29	9	+20	24	Qualification for Caya 4
2	Dakota	10	6	2	2	22	10	+12	20	Qualification for Caya 4
3	RCA	10	5	3	2	21	14	+7	18	Qualification for Caya 4
4	La Fama	10	5	0	5	16	20	−4	15	Qualification for Caya 4
5	Nacional	10	2	0	8	14	30	−16	6	
6	Estrella	10	0	2	8	11	32	−21	2	

=== Results ===
Home \ Away	BRI	DAK	EST	LAF	NAC	RCA
Britannia	—	1–0	6–2	5–1	4–1	0–0
Dakota	1–1	—	2–2	4–1	3–1	0–3
Estrella	0–5	0–1	—	1–2	1–2	1–6
La Fama	0–2	1–2		—	3–1	
Nacional	3–4	0–3	5–2	0–2	—	1–2
RCA	1–1	0–6	1–1	0–3	6–0	—

Updated to match(es) played on 9 May 2025. Source:
Legend: Blue = home team win; Yellow = draw; Red = away team win.
For upcoming matches, an "a" indicates there is an article about the rivalry between the two participants.

=== Extras ===
Home \ Away	EST	LAF	RCA
Estrella	—	1–2	
La Fama		—	
RCA		2–1	—

Updated to match(es) played on 9 May 2025. Source:
Legend: Blue = home team win; Yellow = draw; Red = away team win.
For upcoming matches, an "a" indicates there is an article about the rivalry between the two participants.

== Play-Offs Caya 4 ==
=== League Table ===
Pos	Team	Pld	W	D	L	GF	GA	GD	Pts	Promotion, qualification or relegation
1	Britannia	3	2	1	0	9	3	+6	7	Qualify to Final
2	Dakota	3	2	1	0	6	3	+3	7	Qualify to Final
3	RCA	3	1	0	2	4	6	−2	3	
4	La Fama	3	0	0	3	1	8	−7	0	

Updated to match(es) played on unknown. Source:

=== Results ===
Home \ Away	BRI	DAK	LAF	RCA
Britannia	—		4–1	
Dakota	2–2	—		3–1
La Fama		0–1	—	0–3
RCA	0–3			—

Updated to match(es) played on 9 May 2025. Source:
Legend: Blue = home team win; Yellow = draw; Red = away team win.
For upcoming matches, an "a" indicates there is an article about the rivalry between the two participants.

== Grand Final ==
27 June 2025 Grand Final	Britannia	0–0 (a.e.t.) (4–2 p)	Dakota	CDGT, Stadionweg, Oranjestad, Aruba
8:00	S. Montoya Cano (yellow card) 24'; M. Vielma (yellow card) 62'		R. Derisca (yellow card) 42'; N. Paul (yellow card) 45+2'; D. Briceño (yellow card) 64'	Referee: Ricangel de Leça

== Silver League ==
=== 2A/Poule A table ===
Pos	Team	Pld	W	D	L	GF	GA	GD	Pts	Promotion, qualification or relegation
1	Sporting	10	9	1	0	37	6	+31	28	Promotion, Qualification to Final
2	United	10	7	2	1	56	16	+40	23	Qualification for Promotion play-offs
3	Real Koyari	10	4	1	5	14	34	−20	13	Qualification for Promotion play-offs
4	RCS	10	2	3	5	17	31	−14	9	Relegation to Division Uno
5	Caravel	10	1	4	5	20	32	−12	7	Relegation to Division Uno
6	Unistars	10	1	1	8	10	35	−25	4	Relegation to Division Uno

Updated to match(es) played on unknown. Source:

=== Results ===
Home \ Away	CAR	KOY	RCS	SPO	UST	UTD
Caravel	—	1–3	3–3	0–4		4–4
Real Koyari		—	2–2	0–7	2–0	1–5
RCS	2–2	4–2	—	0–6	4–1	2–6
Sporting	2–1	6–1	5–0	—	3–1	1–1
Unistars	2–0	1–2	1–1	1–2	—	1–12
United	7–1	8–1	5–1	2–4	6–0	—

Updated to match(es) played on 19 May 2025. Source:
Legend: Blue = home team win; Yellow = draw; Red = away team win.
For upcoming matches, an "a" indicates there is an article about the rivalry between the two participants.

=== Extras ===
Home \ Away	CAR	KOY	UST
Caravel	—	2–2	
KOY		—	
Unistars	3–6		—

Updated to match(es) played on 19 May 2025. Source:
Legend: Blue = home team win; Yellow = draw; Red = away team win.
For upcoming matches, an "a" indicates there is an article about the rivalry between the two participants.

=== 2B/Poule B table ===
Pos	Team	Pld	W	D	L	GF	GA	GD	Pts	Promotion, qualification or relegation
1	River Plate	10	7	1	2	29	13	+16	22	Promotion, Qualification to Final
2	Bubali	10	6	2	2	29	13	+16	20	Qualification for Promotion play-offs
3	Jong Aruba	10	5	1	4	22	1	+21	16	Qualification for Promotion play-offs
4	Brazil Juniors	10	4	3	3	21	23	−2	15	Relegation to Division Uno
5	Caiquetio	10	3	3	4	17	16	+1	12	Relegation to Division Uno
6	Estudiantes	10	0	0	10	5	41	−36	0	Relegation to Division Uno

Updated to match(es) played on unknown. Source:

=== Results ===
Home \ Away	BRA	BUB	CQT	EST	JAR	RPL
Brazil Juniors	—	0–6	2–2	5–3	4–2	2–3
Bubali	3–3	—	2–0	2–0	5–1	2–1
Caiquetio	3–1	2–2	—	2–0	1–1	0–1
Estudiantes	0–2	1–4		—	0–7	
Jong Aruba	0–2	3–2	2–1	2–0	—	1–2
River Plate	1–1	2–1	5–1	5–1	2–4	—

Updated to match(es) played on 19 May 2025. Source:
Legend: Blue = home team win; Yellow = draw; Red = away team win.
For upcoming matches, an "a" indicates there is an article about the rivalry between the two participants.

=== Extras ===
Home \ Away	CQT	EST	RPL
Caiquetio	—	5–0	
Estudiantes		—	
River Plate		7–0	—

Updated to match(es) played on 19 May 2025. Source:
Legend: Blue = home team win; Yellow = draw; Red = away team win.
For upcoming matches, an "a" indicates there is an article about the rivalry between the two participants.

== Promotion/Relegation Playoff ==
25 May 2025 Promotion/Relegation Playoff	United	5 – 3	Jong Aruba	CDFF
6:00 PM	A. Jose Fawcett Prieto 02', 41', (yellow card) 87' M. Molinares 19'; C. Navarro (yellow card) 28'; O. Froukje Engelen (yellow card) 34'; S. Schwengle 87'; J. Bernabela (yellow card) 90+2' J. Valverde 90+5'		N. Marin (yellow card) 12' D. Hencoc Yaraure 26', 81'; L. Ravelo 45' (pen.) J. Wever (yellow card) 53'	Referee: Aaron Stamper

25 May 2025 Promotion/Relegation Playoff	Bubali	3 – 1	Real Koyari	CDFF
8:00 PM	J. David Luzardo Valderrama (yellow card) 28', (goal) 64', 90+4'; A. Francis 36'		V. Leocadio (yellow card) 28' S. Reategui 39' R. Thode (red card)	Referee: Desiree Christiaans

== League Silver/Plata Final ==
1 June 2025 Silver/Plata Final	Sporting	3–5	River Plate	CDFF
7:00 PM	J.M. Vargas 13' J. Camilo Sanchez (yellow card) 63' R. Paesch (yellow card) 67' J. Leonardo Pulido (yellow card) 69' D. Lopez 77' S-M. Jansen (yellow card) 78' Ronald Gómez 80'		M. Hooi 28' (pen.), 53' (pen.), (yellow card) 55', (goal) 64' (pen.), 68' A. Morales (yellow card) 43' S. Every (yellow card) 55' J-R. Kelly (yellow card) 55' P. Belzius (yellow card) 82' S. Stamper 88', (yellow card) 88'	Referee: Julnes Plett

== Season summary ==
River Plate continues for 2025–26.

Bubali (and Sporting for reaching 1st in Silver 2A) promoted for 2025–26.

Jong Aruba (and Unistars for reaching 6th in Silver 2A) got relegated for 2025–26 (Division Uno).

RCS, Caravel, Brazil Juniors, Caiquetio, Estudiantes continue for 2025–26 (Division Uno).

River Plate wins their first Silver League title.

although earing promotion, United officially withdraws from the 2025–26 season, thus Real Koyari has been officially promoted for the 2025–26 season-

Santa Fe unlikely to return for 2025–26 Division di Honor or 2025–26 Division Uno
