= 2011–12 Aruban Division di Honor =

Division di Honor
- Season: 2011–12
- Matches: 45
- Goals: 148 (3.29 per match)
- Biggest home win: RCA 8–0 Juventud TL
- Biggest away win: River Plate 1–7 La Fama
- Highest scoring: La Fama 7–2 Caravel

The 2011–12 Aruban Division di Honor (also known as the 2011–12 Campeonato AVB Aruba Bank for sponsorship purposes) was the 51st season of top flight association football in Aruba. The season began on 28 September 2011. RCA were the defending champions, having won their 12th title last season.

== Teams ==
Sporting finished in 10th place at the end of the Regular Stage of last season's competition and were relegated to the Aruban Division Uno. Taking their place were the champions of the Division Uno, Dakota.

River Plate and Juventud TL finished in 8th and 9th place respectively after the Regular Stage the previous and had to play against the 2nd and 3rd place teams from the Division Uno, Brazil Juniors and San Luis Deportivo. River Plate and Juventud Tanki Leendert finished in the top two spots at the end of this playoff and retained their places in the competition.

Location of teams in the 2011–12 Division di Honor

Club	Home city	Home ground
Britannia	Piedra Plat	Franklin J. Bareño Stadium
Bubali	Noord	Bubali Sport Club Field
Dakota	Oranjestad	Guillermo P. Trinidad Stadium
Nacional	Palm Beach	Deportivo Nacional Field
Estrella	Santa Cruz	Estrella Field
Caravel	Angochi	Caravel Field
Juventud TL	Tanki Leendert	Juventud Tanki Leendert Field
La Fama	Savaneta	La Fama Field
RCA	Solito	Guillermo P. Trinidad Stadium
River Plate	Madiki	Guillermo P. Trinidad Stadium

== Regular stage ==
The 10 teams in the competition played against every other team in the league twice in this stage of the competition, once at home and once away, for a total of 18 matches each. The top four teams progressed to the Playoff Stage. The 8th and 9th place teams competed in a Promotion/relegation playoff against the 2nd and 3rd place teams from the Division Uno. The 10th place team was relegated to the Division Uno automatically. This stage of the competition began on 28 September 2011.

=== Table ===
Pos	Team	Pld	W	D	L	GF	GA	GD	Pts	Qualification or relegation
1	RCA	18	14	2	2	58	13	+45	44	Playoff Stage
2	La Fama	18	12	3	3	57	25	+32	39	Playoff Stage
3	Britannia	18	11	3	4	53	26	+27	36	Playoff Stage
4	Estrella	18	9	4	5	39	28	+11	31	Playoff Stage
5	Bubali	18	8	3	7	33	25	+8	27	
6	Nacional	18	7	3	8	22	22	0	24	
7	Dakota	18	5	6	7	27	35	−8	21	
9	River Plate	18	4	3	11	27	48	−21	15	Relegation playoffs
9	Caravel	18	1	6	11	15	53	−38	9	Relegation playoffs
10	Juventud TL	18	2	1	15	11	67	−56	7	Relegation to 2012–13 Aruban Division Uno

Updated to match(es) played on 6 May 2012. Source: Soccerway
Rules for classification: 1) points; 2) goal difference; 3) number of goals scored.

=== Results ===
Home \ Away	BRI	BUB	DAK	DEP	EST	ICR	JTL	LFA	RCA	RPA
Britannia		1–1	3–1	3–2	3–5	2–1	4–0	1–3	1–2	6–2
Bubali	1–5		0–0	1–2	2–3	3–1	2–0	1–2	1–2	2–1
Dakota	0–4	1–1		2–1	3–4	3–0	6–2	0–2	1–0	1–1
Nacional	1–2	0–1	0–0		1–1	0–0	1–0	3–2	0–2	2–3
Estrella	1–1	3–2	3–0	0–2		0–0	0–1	2–3	1–3	0–3
Caravel	1–1	0–8	2–2	1–2	1–3		2–2	0–6	0–4	0–3
Juventud TL	0–5	1–4	1–2	0–3	0–5	1–2		0–4	0–10	2–1
La Fama	3–0	1–2	6–3	1–0	0–1	7–2	5–0		2–4	2–1
RCA	3–2	0–0	3–0	3–0	2–1	5–1	8–0	4–0		4–2
River Plate	1–7	1–2	2–2	0–2	1–4	1–1	3–1	1–7	0–3	

Updated to match(es) played on 6 May 2012. Source: Soccerway
Legend: Blue = home team win; Yellow = draw; Red = away team win.

== Playoff stage ==
The top four teams at the end of the Regular Stage entered this competition. Each team played against the other three twice each, once at home and once away, for a total of six matches each. The top two teams qualified for the Final Stage.

Pos	Team	Pld	W	D	L	GF	GA	GD	Pts	Qualification	LFA	RCA	EST	BRI
1	La Fama	6	3	1	2	8	5	+3	10	Final Stage		2–1	0–1	2–0
2	RCA	6	3	1	2	11	9	+2	10	Final Stage	1–1		1–0	2–3
3	Estrella	6	3	1	2	5	5	0	10		1–0	1–3		1–0
4	Britannia	6	1	1	4	7	12	−5	4		1–3	2–3	1–1	

Updated to match(es) played on pre-season. Source: standings and results
Legend: Blue = home team win; Yellow = draw; Red = away team win.
Rules for classification: 1) points; 2) goal difference; 3) number of goals scored.

== Final stage ==
16 June 2012

RCA	1–1	La Fama

20 June 2012

La Fama	2–4	RCA

== Promotion/relegation playoff ==
The 8th and 9th place teams after the Regular Stage entered this competition, along with the 2nd and 3rd place teams from the Division Uno. After six rounds, the top two teams earned a place in the following season's competition.

Pos	Team	Pld	W	D	L	GF	GA	GD	Pts	Qualification	TBD1	TBD2	TBD3	TBD4
1	TBD	0	0	0	0	0	0	0	0	2012–13 Aruban Division di Honor				
2	TBD	0	0	0	0	0	0	0	0	2012–13 Aruban Division di Honor				
3	TBD	0	0	0	0	0	0	0	0					
4	TBD	0	0	0	0	0	0	0	0					

Updated to match(es) played on pre-season. Source: standings and results
Legend: Blue = home team win; Yellow = draw; Red = away team win.
Rules for classification: 1) points; 2) goal difference; 3) number of goals scored.
