= 2018–19 Aruban Division di Honor =

Aruban Division di Honor
- Season: 2018–19
- Champions: RCA
- Relegated: River Plate
- Caribbean Club Shield: RCA; Nacional
- Matches: 45
- Goals: 159 (3.53 per match)
- Top goalscorer: (Aruba) Ronald Gómez (9)
- Biggest home win: RCA 6–1 Caiquetio (30 November 2018)
- Biggest away win: La Fama 0–5 Dakota (1 December 2018)
- Highest scoring: 8 goals: Bubali 3–5 Nacional (15 December 2018)

The 2018–19 Aruban Division di Honor is the 58th season of the Aruban Division di Honor, the top division football competition in Aruba. The season began on 19 October 2018.

RCA won the league championship, beating Nacional in the final. It was RCA's 17th Aruban domestic league championship, and their first since 2016.

== Changes from 2017–18 ==
Juventud TL were relegated to the Division Uno, while Brazil Juniors were promoted from the Division Uno.

== Teams ==
Locations of the 2017–18 Division di Honor teams

There were 10 clubs that competed during the season.

Team	Home city	Home ground
Brazil Juniors	Brasil	Brazil Juniors Stadium
Britannia	Piedra Plat	Compleho Deportivo Franklyn Bareño
Bubali	Noord	Bubali Stadium
Caiquetio	Paradera	Caiquetio Stadium
Dakota	Oranjestad	Trinidad Stadium
Estrella	Santa Cruz	Trinidad Stadium
La Fama	Savaneta	La Fama Stadium
Nacional	Palm Beach/Noord	Nacional Stadium
RCA	Oranjestad	Trinidad Stadium
River Plate	Oranjestad	Trinidad Stadium

== Regular season ==
Pos	Team	Pld	W	D	L	GF	GA	GD	Pts	Qualification or relegation
1	Dakota (A)	18	14	1	3	51	16	+35	43	Advance to Caya 4
2	Nacional (A)	18	13	1	4	40	24	+16	40	Advance to Caya 4
3	RCA (C)	18	12	2	4	44	19	+25	38	Advance to Caya 4
4	Estrella (A)	18	8	6	4	34	30	+4	30	Advance to Caya 4
5	Britannia	18	8	1	9	41	37	+4	25	
6	Bubali	18	8	1	9	39	37	+2	25	
7	Brazil Juniors	18	5	2	11	24	33	−9	17	
8	La Fama (O)	18	4	4	10	19	39	−20	16	Relegation playoffs
9	Caiquetio (O)	18	3	5	10	21	49	−28	14	Relegation playoffs
10	River Plate (R)	18	1	5	12	23	52	−29	8	Relegated to Division Uno

Source: Soccerway
(A) Advance to a further round; (C) Champions; (O) Play-off winners; (R) Relegated

== Caya 4 ==
Pos	Team	Pld	W	D	L	GF	GA	GD	Pts	Qualification or relegation
1	RCA (C)	6	4	1	1	14	6	+8	13	Advance to Championship final
2	Nacional (A)	6	4	1	1	11	5	+6	13	Advance to Championship final
3	Dakota	6	2	2	2	6	5	+1	8	
4	Estrella	6	0	0	6	3	18	−15	0	

Source: Soccerway
(A) Advance to a further round; (C) Champions

== Championship final ==
=== First leg ===
12 June 2019
20:30 EST

RCA	1–3	Nacional

Trinidad Stadium, Oranjestad

=== Second leg ===
15 June 2019
20:30 EST

Nacional	0–1	RCA

Trinidad Stadium, Oranjestad

=== Third leg ===
19 June 2019
20:30 EST

RCA	1–0	Nacional
Gómez 63'	Report

Trinidad Stadium, Oranjestad
Attendance: 2,000
Referee: Ricangel de Leca

RCA won championship qualified for Caribbean Club Shield.

== Top goalscorers ==
Rank	Player	Club	Goals
1	(Aruba) Ronald Gómez	RCA	8
2	(Aruba) Ciaran Arends	La Fama	7
2	(Colombia) Devis Oliveros	Nacional	7
2	(Aruba) Daniel Linscheer	Britannia	7
5	(Aruba) Maurice Escalona	Bubali	6
5	(Jamaica) Albert Francis	Dakota	6
5	(Aruba) Jefferson Lopez	Caiquetio	6
8	(Aruba) Owen van der Wijne	Brazil Juniors	5
8	(Venezuela) Luis Estrada	Britannia	5
8	(Aruba) Javier Jiménez	Nacional	5

Source.
