= 2016–17 Aruban Division di Honor =

Aruban Division di Honor
- Season: 2016–17
- Champions: Nacional
- Relegated: La Fama; Jong Aruba
- CFU Club Championship: RCA; Nacional
- Matches played: 81
- Goals scored: 277 (3.42 per match)
- Top goalscorer: (Colombia) Devis Oliveros (17)
- Biggest home win: Dakota 12–0 Jong Aruba (3 Dec. 2016)
- Biggest away win: La Fama 1–7 Estrella (15 Feb. 2017)
- Highest scoring: Dakota 12–0 Jong Aruba (3 Dec. 2016)
- Longest winning run: 4: Britannia (8–22 Oct. 2016)
- Longest unbeaten run: 8: Britannia (8 Oct.–12 Dec. 2016)
- Longest winless run: 12: Estrella (12 Nov. 2016–23 Apr. 2017)
- Longest losing run: 7: Jong Aruba (21 Oct.–9 Dec. 2016)
- All statistics correct as of 30 April 2017.

The 2016–17 Aruban Division di Honor was the 56th season of the Aruban Division di Honor, the top tier of football in Aruba. The regular season began on 7 October 2016, with Dakota taking a 3–0 win over RCA. The final game of the regular season was on 23 April 2017 with Britannia taking a 1–0 home victory over La Fama.

The Division di Honor's second stage is the "Caya 4" tournament, where the top two teams qualify for the final and the 2018 CFU Club Championship. The competition began on 12 May and concluded on 9 June 2017. RCA, Britannia, Dakota and Nacional participated in the tournament with RCA and Nacional taking the top two spots after a forfeit by Nacional in their final match was later overturned.

The final uses a modified two-out-of-three format and will begin on 27 June 2017 and conclude in July 2017.

RCA entered the season as the defending champions.

== Teams ==
There were 10 clubs that competed during the season.

Team	Home city	Home ground
Britannia	Piedra Plat	Compleho Deportivo Franklyn Bareño
Bubali	Noord	Bubali Stadium
Caravel	Santa Cruz/Angochi	Caravel Stadium
Dakota	Oranjestad	Guillermo P. Trinidad Stadium
Estrella	Santa Cruz	Estrella Stadium
Jong Aruba	Noord	Compleho Deportivo Frans Figaroa
La Fama	Savaneta	La Fama Stadium
Nacional	Palm Beach/Noord	Deportivo Nacional Stadium
RCA	Oranjestad	Guillermo P. Trinidad Stadium
River Plate	Oranjestad	Guillermo P. Trinidad Stadium

== Regular season ==
The ten teams were to play each other in a double round robin, for a total of 18 matches, with a mid-season break in December and January. Jong Aruba withdrew from the league during the mid-season break, after 9 out of 18 matches were played. All of their results were annulled, and their remaining fixtures were cancelled.

=== Table and results ===
Pos	Team	Pld	W	D	L	GF	GA	GD	Pts	Qualification or relegation	RCA	BRI	DAK	DPN	RVP	EST	BUB	INC	LAF	SJA
1	RCA	16	12	1	3	36	21	+15	37	Qualification to the Caya 4	—	1–0	0–3	0–4	3–2	3–1	1–0	4–1	7–1	8–0
2	Britannia	16	10	2	4	43	13	+30	32	Qualification to the Caya 4	0–0	—	3–0	3–2	1–2	1–0	8–0	3–0	1–0	3–1
3	Dakota	16	8	4	4	35	23	+12	28	Qualification to the Caya 4	3–0	1–0	—	0–2	3–0	2–2	6–0	2–1	1–0	12–0
4	Nacional	16	8	3	5	40	28	+12	27	Qualification to the Caya 4	0–1	1–6	5–2	—	1–0	0–2	6–2	2–1	4–1	w/o
5	River Plate	16	6	3	7	22	27	−5	21		1–2	0–5	2–2	2–1	—	3–0	3–5	1–2	0–0	4–0
6	Estrella	16	4	6	6	33	32	+1	18		2–3	3–3	3–1	2–2	1–2	—	2–2	1–1	3–3	w/o
7	Bubali	16	4	4	8	29	50	−21	16		1–4	2–5	2–2	4–4	0–1	4–1	—	1–3	3–2	w/o
8	Caravel (Note: Caravel were deducted one point after their home match against Bubali was abandoned in the 80th minute. Bubali were up 2–1 at the time, and the result held.)	16	2	5	9	15	32	−17	10	Qualification to the Relegation playoffs	0–4	0–4	1–1	1–1	0–0	1–3	1–2	—	1–2	w/o
9	La Fama	16	2	4	10	19	46	−27	10	Qualification to the Relegation playoffs	2–3	1–0	2–6	1–5	1–3	1–7	1–1	1–1	—	5–1
10	Jong Aruba (R)	9	0	1	8	5	44	−39	1	Withdrew, relegation to 2017–18 Aruban Division Uno	w/o	w/o	w/o	1–6	w/o	1–4	1–1	0–1	w/o	—

Source: RSSSF FIFA
Rules for classification: 1) points; 2) goal difference; 3) number of goals scored.
(R) Relegated

== Postseason ==
=== Caya 4 ===
The Caya 4 tournament began on 12 May and concluded on 9 June 2017. The top four teams played six additional games, a home-and-away double round-robin against their three opponents.

Pos	Team	Pld	W	D	L	GF	GA	GD	Pts	Qualification or relegation	RCA	DPN	BRI	DAK
1	RCA	6	3	0	3	5	5	0	9	Championship	—	0–1	1–0	1–2
2	Nacional	6	2	2	2	11	8	+3	8	Championship	1–2	—	1–2	1–1 (Note: Match was originally a 1–1 draw, but Nacional later forfeited 0–2 to Dakota for using an ineligible player who had immigrated illegally. However, that decision was later reversed on appeal.)
3	Britannia	6	2	2	2	10	9	+1	8		0–1	3–3	—	4–2
4	Dakota	6	2	2	2	7	11	−4	8		1–0	0–4	1–1	—

Source: RSSSF FIFA

=== Championship ===
The top two finishers of the Caya 4 tournament will play in the Championship, which is a best two-out-of-three series. However unlike a typical two-out-of-three series, if a team wins one of the first two matches and the other match is a draw, that team wins the series without playing the third game. This is despite the fact that their opponent could potentially tie the series if a third game were played. The winner also qualifies for the Caribbean Club Shield, the second tier club competition for the Caribbean region for associations without a professional league.

The tournament will be held in June and July 2017.

27 June 2017

RCA	1–3	Nacional
	Report

Trinidad Stadium, Oranjestad

1 July 2017

Nacional	2–6	RCA
	Report

Trinidad Stadium, Oranjestad

4 July 2017

RCA	1–3	Nacional

Trinidad Stadium, Oranjestad

Nacional won the Championship 2 matches to 1. Qualified for the Caribbean Club Shield

=== Relegation playoffs ===
The eighth and ninth place finishers played against the second and third place finishers of the second division in a double round-robin to decide who would play in the top tier. First and second place finishers would compete in the 2017–18 Division di Honor, while the third and fourth place finishers would compete in the 2017–18 Division Uno. Before the start of the 2017–18 Division di Honor, Caravel withdrew from the league due to financial reasons and 2016–17 Division Uno champions Real Piedra Plat folded. As a result, La Fama were reprieved of relegation, and Juventud TL were awarded promotion.

Pos	Team	Pld	W	D	L	GF	GA	GD	Pts	Qualification or relegation	INC	CAQ	LAF	JTL
1	Caravel	6	3	1	2	6	4	+2	10	Club folded after relegation playoffs	—	0–1	1–0	3–1
2	Caiquetio	6	3	1	2	7	6	+1	10	2017–18 Aruban Division di Honor	1–1	—	1–0	1–2
3	La Fama (R)	6	2	1	3	7	4	+3	7	2017–18 Aruban Division di Honor	1–0	0–2	—	0–0
4	Juventud TL (P)	6	2	1	3	6	12	−6	7	2017–18 Aruban Division di Honor	0–1	3–1	0–6	—

Source: RSSSF FIFA
(P) Promoted;
(R) Club reprieved of relegation

== Statistics ==
=== Top goalscorers ===
Rank	Player	Club	Goals
1	(Colombia) Devis Oliveros	Nacional	17
2	(Jamaica) Kenroy Ranger	Nacional	13
3	(Brazil) Bruno Conceicao	Britannia	12
4	(Curaçao) Pheadrick Baromeo	Estrella	11
5	(El Salvador) Jesus Peñate	Dakota	9
5	(Colombia) John Silva	Bubali	9
5	(Aruba) Davidson Kaarsbaan	La Fama	9
8	(Aruba) Jean-Luc Bergen	RCA	8
9	(Aruba) Nickelson Paul	Dakota	8
10	(Aruba) Peterson Guerrier	River Plate	7

As of 21 May 2017
