= 2012–13 Aruban Division di Honor =

Division di Honor
- Season: 2012–13
- Matches played: 87
- Goals scored: 286 (3.29 per match)
- Top goalscorer: (Jamaica) Albert Francis
- Biggest home win: La Fama 5-0 Caiquetio
- Biggest away win: Nacional 7-1 Caiquetio
- Highest scoring: Nacional 6-3 Bubali
- Longest winning run: Britannia 6 games
- Longest unbeaten run: La Fama 11 games
- Longest losing run: Caiquetio 11 games

The 2012–13 Aruban Division di Honor is the 52nd season of top flight association football in Aruba. The season began on 12 October 2012. RCA were the defending champions, having won their 13th title last season.

== Teams ==
Juventud TL finished in 10th place at the end of the Regular Stage of last season's competition and were relegated to the Aruban Division Uno. Taking their place were the champions of the Division Uno, Caiquetio.

River Plate and Caravel finished in 8th and 9th place after the Regular Stage last season and had to play against the 2nd and 3rd place teams from the Division Uno. River Plate and Sporting finished in the top two spots at the end of this playoff and earned their places in the competition for 2012–13, but Sporting withdrew early in the season, leaving 9 teams in the top division.

=== Club information ===
Club	Home city	Home ground
Britannia	Piedra Plat	Trinidad Stadium
Bubali	Noord	Compleho Deportivo Frans Figaroa
Caiquetio	Caiquetio	Trinidad Stadium
Dakota	Oranjestad	Trinidad Stadium
Nacional	Palm Beach	Compleho Deportivo Frans Figaroa
Estrella	Santa Cruz	Trinidad Stadium
La Fama	Savaneta	Trinidad Stadium
RCA	Oranjestad	Trinidad Stadium
River Plate	Oranjestad	Trinidad Stadium

== Regular stage ==
The 9 teams in the competition play against every other team in the league twice in this stage of the competition, once at home and once away, for a total of 16 matches each. The top six teams progress to the Calle 6, where they play each other once each. The top four teams progress to the Playoff Stage.

=== Table ===
Pos	Team	Pld	W	D	L	GF	GA	GD	Pts	Qualification
1	Britannia	16	11	4	1	33	11	+22	37	Calle 6
2	Nacional	16	9	3	4	36	23	+13	30	Calle 6
3	La Fama	16	8	5	3	34	23	+11	29	Calle 6
4	RCA	16	8	5	3	29	18	+11	29	Calle 6
5	Estrella	16	7	2	7	25	23	+2	23	Calle 6
6	Dakota	16	6	2	8	28	25	+3	20	Calle 6
7	River Plate	16	6	2	8	27	32	−5	20	
8	Bubali	16	2	3	11	17	34	−17	9	Relegation playoffs
9	Caiquetio	16	1	2	13	10	50	−40	5	Relegation playoffs

Updated to match(es) played on 6 June 2013. Source: AVB
Rules for classification: 1) points; 2) goal difference; 3) number of goals scored.

=== Results ===
Home \ Away	BRI	BUB	CAI	DAK	DEP	EST	LFA	RCA	RPA
Britannia		4–1	4–0	3–0	0–0	1–0	1–1	3–1	4–1
Bubali	0–1		2–1	2–1	3–6	0–3	0–1	1–2	1–2
Caiquetio	1–2	1–1		0–5	1–7	0–3	0–3	0–3	3–2
Dakota	0–1	1–1	4–0		1–3	1–4	3–3	2–1	3–1
Nacional	2–1	2–1	2–1	1–2		4–1	2–4	2–2	2–0
Estrella	1–2	2–1	1–1	2–1	1–2		0–2	0–2	3–2
La Fama	1–1	2–2	5–0	0–3	2–0	0–1		2–4	2–1
RCA	1–1	2–0	2–0	1–0	1–1	2–2	2–3		2–0
River Plate	1–4	3–1	4–1	2–1	2–0	2–1	3–3	1–1	

Updated to match(es) played on 7 April 2014. Source: AVB
Legend: Blue = home team win; Yellow = draw; Red = away team win.

== Calle 6 ==
The top six teams at the end of the Regular Stage enter this competition. Points from the regular stage are retained, and each team plays against the other five teams once. The top four qualify for the Playoff Stage

=== Standings ===
Pos	Team	Pld	W	D	L	GF	GA	GD	Pts	Qualification
1	Britannia	21	15	4	2	43	20	+23	49	Playoff Stage
2	La Fama	21	11	6	4	41	28	+13	39	Playoff Stage
3	Nacional	21	11	3	7	47	31	+16	36	Playoff Stage
4	RCA	21	10	5	6	36	26	+10	35	Playoff Stage
5	Estrella	21	9	2	10	31	31	0	29	
6	Dakota	21	7	3	11	34	34	0	24	

Updated to match(es) played on 21 May 2013. Source: AVB
Rules for classification: 1) points; 2) goal difference; 3) number of goals scored.

=== Results ===
Home \ Away	BRI	DAK	DEP	EST	LFA	RCA
Britannia		2–1	1–5			
Dakota			0–2		1–1	1–3
Nacional				1–2	2–3	1–2
Estrella	1–2	1–3				
La Fama	0–1			2–1		
RCA	2–4			0–1	0–1	

Updated to match(es) played on 21 May 2013. Source: AVB
Legend: Blue = home team win; Yellow = draw; Red = away team win.

== Playoff stage ==
The top four teams at the end of the Calle 6 enter this competition (known as the AVB Subway Cup 2013 for sponsorship purposes). Each team plays against the other three twice each, once at home and once away, for a total of six matches each. The top two teams qualify for the Final Stage.

=== Standings ===
Pos	Team	Pld	W	D	L	GF	GA	GD	Pts	Qualification	LFA	BRI	DEP	RCA
1	La Fama	6	2	3	1	7	7	0	9	Final Stage		1–1	3–1	1–1
2	Britannia	6	2	2	2	11	8	+3	8	Final Stage	0–1		2–2	1–3
3	Nacional	6	2	2	2	10	14	−4	8		1–1	1–5		2–1
4	RCA	6	2	1	3	10	9	+1	7		3–0	0–2	2–3	

Updated to match(es) played on 16 June 2013. Source: AVB
Rules for classification: 1) points; 2) goal difference; 3) number of goals scored.

== Final stage ==
19 June 2013

La Fama	1–2	Britannia

22 June 2013

Britannia	1–3	La Fama

28 June 2013

La Fama	1–1	Britannia

2 July 2013

Britannia	0–2	La Fama

Champions: La Fama

== Promotion/relegation playoff ==
The 8th and 9th place teams after the Regular Stage is finished enter this competition, along with the 2nd and 3rd place teams from the Division Uno. After six rounds, the top two teams will earn a place in next season's competition.

Pos	Team	Pld	W	D	L	GF	GA	GD	Pts	Qualification	CAI	BUB	JUV	ARS
1	Caiquetio	6	4	1	1	14	7	+7	13	2013–14 Aruban Division di Honor		1–0	5–1	1–1
2	Bubali	6	3	1	2	11	5	+6	10	2013–14 Aruban Division di Honor	3–1		2–3	1–0
3	Juventud TL	6	1	2	3	8	14	−6	5		1–3	0–0		2–2
4	Arsenal	6	1	2	3	6	13	−7	5		1–3	0–5	2–1	

Updated to match(es) played on 4 June 2013. Source: AVB
Rules for classification: 1) points; 2) goal difference; 3) number of goals scored.
