= 2017–18 Aruban Division di Honor =

Aruban Division di Honor
- Season: 2017–18
- Champions: Dakota
- Relegated: Juventud TL
- Caribbean Club Shield: Dakota
- Matches played: 100
- Goals scored: 362 (3.62 per match)
- Top goalscorer: (Jamaica) Kenroy Ranger (18)
- Biggest home win: RCA 13–0 JTL (25 February 2018)
- Biggest away win: JTL 0–7 River Plate (13 April 2018)
- Highest scoring: 13 goals: RCA 13–0 Juventud TL (25 February 2018)
- Longest winning run: 5 matches Dakota (13 October – 16 November)
- Longest unbeaten run: 7 matches Nacional (28 April – 22 June)
- Longest winless run: 18 matches Juventud TL (13 October – 5 May)
- Longest losing run: 14 matches Juventud TL (24 November – present)
- All statistics correct as of 27 June 2018.

The 2017–18 Aruban Division di Honor is the 57th season of the Aruban Division di Honor, the top tier of football in Aruba.

The regular season began on 13 October 2017 and concluded on 5 May 2018. The league champions and berths into the Caribbean Club Shield will be determined through a four-team postseason tournament, known as the Caya 4. The Caya 4 began on 18 May 2018 and concluded 3 July 2018.

== Teams ==
There were 10 clubs that competed during the season.

Team	Home city	Home ground
Britannia	Piedra Plat	Compleho Deportivo Franklyn Bareño
Bubali	Noord	Bubali Stadium
Caiquetio	Paradera	Caiquetio Stadium
Dakota	Oranjestad	Trinidad Stadium
Estrella	Santa Cruz	Trinidad Stadium
Juventud TL	Oranjestad	Trinidad Stadium
La Fama	Savaneta	La Fama Stadium
Nacional	Noord	Nacional Stadium
RCA	Oranjestad	Trinidad Stadium
River Plate	Oranjestad	Trinidad Stadium

== Regular season ==
Pos	Team	Pld	W	D	L	GF	GA	GD	Pts	Qualification or relegation
1	Dakota	18	13	2	3	38	17	+21	41	Qualification to the Caya 4
2	Estrella	18	12	3	3	44	20	+24	39	Qualification to the Caya 4
3	Nacional	18	12	2	4	49	24	+25	38	Qualification to the Caya 4
4	Britannia	18	9	5	4	36	25	+11	32	Qualification to the Caya 4
5	RCA	18	9	1	8	48	25	+23	28	
6	Bubali	18	8	3	7	31	20	+11	27	
7	River Plate	18	8	0	10	41	47	−6	24	
8	La Fama	18	4	5	9	20	38	−18	17	Qualification to the Relegation playoffs
9	Caiquetio	18	3	2	13	20	38	−18	11	Qualification to the Relegation playoffs
10	Juventud TL (R)	18	0	1	17	15	88	−73	1	Relegation to 2018–19 Aruban Division Uno

Source: RSSSF FIFA
Rules for classification: 1) points; 2) goal difference; 3) number of goals scored.
(R) Relegated

== Playoffs ==
=== Caya 4 ===
Pos	Team	Pld	W	D	L	GF	GA	GD	Pts	Qualification or relegation	DPN	DAK	EST	BRI
1	Nacional	6	3	2	1	9	8	+1	11	Championship	—	1–0	2–4	0–0
2	Dakota	6	3	1	2	10	6	+4	10	Championship	2–2	—	2–0	2–0
3	Estrella	6	3	1	2	9	6	+3	10		0–1	3–1	—	0–0
4	Britannia	6	0	2	4	2	10	−8	2		2–3	0–3	0–2	—

Source: RSSSF and Futbol Aruba

=== Championship ===
First Leg [Jun 27]

Nacional 0-0 Dakota

Second Leg [Jul 3]

Dakota 4-2 Nacional

Third Leg [Jul 7, if necessary]

Nacional n/p Dakota

== Top goalscorers ==
Rank	Player	Club	Goals
1	(Jamaica) Kenroy Ranger	Nacional	18
2	(Colombia) Devis Oliveros	Nacional	17
3	(Aruba) Ronald Gómez	RCA	13
3	(Haiti) Fladimy François	River Plate	13
5	(Aruba) Jean-Luc Bergen	RCA	11
5	(Venezuela) Sebastian Montoya	Britannia	11
5	(Aruba) Hugo Robert	Estrella	11
8	(Aruba) Ricky Hodge	Dakota	10
9	(Venezuela) Luis Estrada	Britannia	9
9	(Aruba) Kenderic Paulina	River Plate	9

As of 18 June 2018
