= 2022–23 Aruban Division di Honor =

2022–23 season Aruban Division di Honor table

Aruban Division di Honor
- Season: 2022–23
- Dates: 9 September 2022 - 8 July 2023
- Champions: RCA; 17th title
- Promoted: Bubali, Caiquetio
- Relegated: Caravel, United
- 2024 CONCACAF Caribbean Shield: RCA
- Matches played: 23
- Goals scored: 637 (27.7 per match)
- Top goalscorer: (Aruba) Ricky Hodge (22 goals)
- Biggest home win: 6 goals: Britannia 6–0 Caravel (23 Oct 2022)
- Biggest away win: 9 goals: United 0–9 RCA (21 Oct 2022)
- Highest scoring: 9 goals: United 0–9 RCA (21 Oct 2022)

The 2022–23 Aruban Division di Honor was the 62nd season of the Division di Honor, the top division football competition in Aruba. The season ran from 9 September 2022 until 8 July 2023. It is the first season that the new format is introduced.

== Teams ==
=== Stadiums and locations ===
Club	Location	Venue	Capacity	2021–22 position
Britannia	Paradera	Franklyn Bareño Sports Complex	3000	3rd
Caravel	Santa Cruz/Angochi	Caravel Stadium	800	6th
Dakota	Oranjestad	Guillermo P. Trinidad Stadium	5,500	1st
Estrella	Santa Cruz	Estrella Stadium	1,000	8th
La Fama	Savaneta	La Fama Stadium	1,100	4th
Nacional	Palm Beach	Deportivo Nacional Stadium	1,000	5th
RCA	Oranjestad	Guillermo P. Trinidad Stadium	5,500	2nd
River Plate	Oranjestad	Guillermo P. Trinidad Stadium	5,500	7th
Santa Fe	Paradera	Guillermo P. Trinidad Stadium	5,000	D1, 1st
United	Noord	Guillermo P. Trinidad Stadium	5,500	9th

== Regular season ==
All matches take place in Guillermo P. Trinidad Stadium.

Pos	Team	Pld	W	D	L	GF	GA	GD	Pts	Promotion, qualification or relegation
1	RCA	9	6	2	1	30	10	+20	20	Qualification for the Caya 6 (Gold League)
2	Nacional	9	6	0	3	20	15	+5	18	Qualification for the Caya 6 (Gold League)
3	Dakota	9	5	1	3	35	15	+20	16	Qualification for the Caya 6 (Gold League)
4	Estrella	9	4	3	2	16	15	+1	15	Qualification for the Caya 6 (Gold League)
5	Britannia	9	4	2	3	22	13	+9	14	Qualification for the Caya 6 (Gold League)
6	River Plate	9	4	2	3	13	15	−2	14	Qualification for the Caya 6 (Gold League)
7	La Fama	9	3	2	4	6	16	−10	11	Qualification for the Silver League
8	Santa Fe	9	2	1	6	15	19	−4	7	Qualification for the Silver League
9	United (R)	9	2	1	6	14	31	−17	7	Qualification for the Silver League
10	Caravel (R)	9	2	0	7	9	31	−22	6	Qualification for the Silver League

Updated to match(es) played on 10 May 2023. Source:
(R) Relegated

source=RSSSF

== Gold League ==
=== Caya 6 ===
All matches take place in Centro Deportivo Frans Figaroa.

Pos	Team	Pld	W	D	L	GF	GA	GD	Pts	Promotion, qualification or relegation
1	Britannia (Q)	10	8	0	2	19	10	+9	24	Qualification for the Caya 4
2	RCA (Q)	10	6	2	2	25	11	+14	20	Qualification for the Caya 4
3	Dakota (Q)	10	5	1	4	21	18	+3	16	Qualification for the Caya 4
4	Nacional (Q)	10	4	2	4	19	21	−2	14	Qualification for the Caya 4
5	Estrella	10	2	2	6	19	25	−6	8	
6	River Plate	10	1	1	8	18	36	−18	4	

Updated to match(es) played on 10 May 2023. Source:
(Q) Qualified for the phase indicated

=== Caya 4 ===
Pos	Team	Pld	W	D	L	GF	GA	GD	Pts	Promotion, qualification or relegation
1	RCA (Q)	3	1	1	1	4	2	+2	4	Qualification for the Grand Final
2	Dakota (Q)	3	1	1	1	5	6	−1	4	Qualification for the Grand Final
3	Britannia	3	1	1	1	3	4	−1	4	
4	Nacional	3	0	3	0	4	4	0	3	

Updated to match(es) played on unknown. Source: RSSSF
(Q) Qualified for the phase indicated

=== Grand Final ===
8 July 2023	RCA	2–1(1:1) (a.e.t.)	Dakota	Noord
20:00	Jhon Silva 65'; Albert Francis 111'	Report	Daniel Briceño 90+2'	Stadium: Centro Deportivo Frans Figaroa; Referee: Jade Salamatin

== Silver League ==
All matches take place in Centro Deportivo Frans Figaroa. This is the promotion/relegation playoff played by 4 bottom teams in the Aruban Division di Honor regular season and 8 top teams in the Aruban Division Uno.

=== Group Stage ===
==== Group A ====
Pos	Team	Pld	W	D	L	GF	GA	GD	Pts	Promotion, qualification or relegation
1	Bubali (P)	10	8	1	1	24	7	+17	25	2023-24 Division di Honor
2	Caiquetio (Q)	10	7	1	2	21	9	+12	22	Qualification for playoff
3	United (Q)	10	6	0	4	27	13	+14	18	Qualification for playoff
4	CDRA	10	2	2	6	15	27	−12	8	2023-24 Division Uno
5	Brazil Juniors	10	2	2	6	10	26	−16	8	2023-24 Division Uno
6	Caravel (R)	10	1	2	7	13	28	−15	5	2023-24 Division Uno

Updated to match(es) played on 6 June 2023. Source:
(P) Promoted; (Q) Qualified for the phase indicated; (R) Relegated

==== Group B ====
Pos	Team	Pld	W	D	L	GF	GA	GD	Pts	Promotion, qualification or relegation
1	La Fama (P)	10	9	0	1	36	8	+28	27	2023-24 Division di Honor
2	Santa Fe (Q)	10	7	1	2	30	16	+14	22	Qualification for playoff
3	Sporting (Q)	10	6	0	4	24	14	+10	18	Qualification for playoff
4	RCS	10	2	3	5	19	30	−11	9	2023-24 Division Uno
5	Unistars	10	2	1	7	11	28	−17	7	2023-24 Division Uno
6	Estudiantes	10	1	1	8	12	36	−24	4	2023-24 Division Uno

Updated to match(es) played on 6 June 2023. Source:
(P) Promoted; (Q) Qualified for the phase indicated

=== Final ===
2 June 2023	Bubali	1–2	La Fama	Noord
20:00		Report		Stadium: Centro Deportivo Frans Figaroa; Referee: Desiree Christiaans

=== Playoff ===
The winners will play in Division di Honor while the losers will play in Aruban Division Uno in the 2023-24 season.

4 June 2023	Caiquetio	1–0	Sporting	Noord
18:00		Report		Stadium: Centro Deportivo Frans Figaroa; Referee: Joscar de Kort

4 June 2023	United	1–3	Santa Fe	Noord
20:00		Report		Stadium: Centro Deportivo Frans Figaroa; Referee: Mario Monsalve

== Statistics ==
=== Top scorers of the 2022-23 Regular Season ===
Rank	Goalscorer	Club	Goals
1	(Aruba) Ricky Hodge	Dakota	12
2
2	(Aruba) Pieter Susebeek	Britannia	9
2	(Aruba) Trevor Faro	Estrella	9
2	(Aruba) Daniel Linscheer	RCA	9
5	(Aruba) Steven Rua	Britannia	7
5	(Aruba) Jhon Silva	RCA	7
7	(Aruba) Antonio Fawcett	United	6
7	(Colombia) Camilo Peña	Dakota	6
9	(Aruba) Glenbert Croes	Nacional	5
9	(Jamaica) Albert Francis	RCA	5

Source: AVB-Division Honor

=== Top scorers of the 2022-23 Gold League ===
Rank	Goalscorer	Club	Goals
1	(Colombia) Devis Oliveros	Nacional	12
1	(Aruba) Trevor Faro	Estrella	12
3	(Aruba) Jhon Silva	RCA	10
4	(Venezuela) Miguel Vielma	Britannia	7
5	(Venezuela) Fernando de Sousa	Dakota	6
5	(Aruba) Ricky Hodge	Dakota	6
7	(Aruba) Steven Rua	Britannia	4
7	(Aruba) Jason Carolina	River Plate	4
7	(Aruba) Daniel Linscheer	RCA	4
10	(Aruba) Pieter Susebeek	Britannia	3

Source: AVB-Division Honor Gold
