= 2013–14 Aruban Division di Honor =

Statistics of the 2013–14 Aruban Division di Honor

== League table ==
1. Britannia 17 11 4 2 43-21 37 Piedra Plat
2. RCA 17 10 5 2 60-17 35 Oranjestad, Solito
3. Estrella 17 9 4 4 41-20 31 Santa Cruz, Papilon
4. Dakota 17 9 3 5 43-21 30 Oranjestad, Dakota
5. Nacional 17 9 3 5 35-17 30 Palm Beach, Noord
6. La Fama 17 7 3 7 32-35 24 Savaneta
7. River Plate 17 6 5 6 40-31 23 Oranjestad, Madiki
8. Bubali 17 5 4 8 14-18 19 Bubali, Noord
9. Caiquetio 17 1 4 12 9-51 7 Paradera
10. Caravel 17 0 1 16 7-93 1 Santa Cruz, Angochi
