= List of football clubs in Aruba =

This is a list of football (soccer) clubs in Aruba by their region.

Noord/Tanki Leendert:

- SV Juventud Tanki Leendert
- SV Bubali
- SV Jong Aruba
- SV Real Koyari
- SV Sporting Aruba
- SV Deportivo Nacional
- SC United

Paradera

- SV Britannia
- CD Rooi Afo
- SV Atletico Santa Fe
- SV Caiquetio

Oranjestad

- SV Dakota
- SV Riverplate
- SV Estudiantes
- SV Racing Club Aruba
- SV Master Boys

Santa Cruz

- SV Estrella
- SV Sportboys
- SV Arsenal Aruba
- SV Independiente Caravel
- SV Atlantico Deportivo

Savaneta

- SV Undesa
- SV Racing Club Savaneta
- SV Unistars
- SV La Fama
- SV San Luis Deportivo

San Nicolaas

- SV Brazil Juniors
- FC San Nicolas

Merged

- JTL and Sportboys to form JTL/Sportboys
