= 1960 CCCF Championship squads =

These are the squads for the countries that played in the 1960 CCCF Championship.

The age listed for each player is on 14 February 1960, the first day of the tournament. The numbers of caps and goals listed for each player do not include any matches played after the start of the tournament. The club listed is the club for which the player last played a competitive match before the tournament. The nationality for each club reflects the national association (not the league) to which the club is affiliated. A flag is included for coaches who are of a different nationality than their own national team.

== Netherlands Antilles ==
Head coach: (Argentina) Ángel Botta

No.	Pos.	Player	Date of birth (age)	Caps	Goals	Club
1	GK	Paul Johan Díaz	19 December 1936 (aged 23)	0	0	(Netherlands Antillean Football Union) La Fama
2	GK	Rafael Caster		0	0	(Netherlands Antillean Football Union) Racing Aruba
3	GK	Jubert Richardson		0	0	(Netherlands Antillean Football Union) Dakota
4	DF	José La Rosa	25 October 1933 (aged 26)	4	0	(Netherlands Antillean Football Union) La Fama
5	DF	Edgar Joaquín Vos		0	0	(Netherlands Antillean Football Union) Aruba Juniors
6	DF	Nathaniel Andrews		0	0	(Netherlands Antillean Football Union) River Plate Aruba
7	MF	José Andries Boye		4	0	(Netherlands Antillean Football Union) Racing Aruba
8	MF	Juan Kock	27 March 1940 (aged 19)	0	0	(Netherlands Antillean Football Union) San Nicolas Juniors
9	MF	Hubert Janzen	4 February 1940 (aged 20)	0	0	(Netherlands Antillean Football Union) Centro Dominguito
10	MF	Porfirio Eckmeyer		0	0	(Netherlands Antillean Football Union) Bubali
11	MF	Andresito Croes	30 May 1933 (aged 26)	0	0	(Netherlands Antillean Football Union) Racing Aruba
12	MF	Cornelius Wiersma	27 November 1936 (aged 23)	0	0	(Netherlands Antillean Football Union) Dakota
13	MF	Rudolfo Dirksz	17 October 1932 (aged 27)	3	0	(Netherlands Antillean Football Union) Racing Aruba
14	MF	Julio Jansen	20 October 1928 (aged 31)	10	5	(Netherlands Antillean Football Union) Racing Aruba
15	MF	Ocando Wernet	2 February 1936 (aged 24)	0	0	(Netherlands Antillean Football Union) Estrella
16	MF	Damasio Werleman	14 March 1936 (aged 23)	0	0	(Netherlands Antillean Football Union) Estrella
17	FW	José María Bibiana		3	1	(Netherlands Antillean Football Union) Sithoc
18	FW	Carlos Regales	13 February 1938 (aged 22)	0	0	(Netherlands Antillean Football Union) Sithoc
19	FW	Bernard Geerman	20 August 1938 (aged 21)	0	0	(Netherlands Antillean Football Union) Aruba Juniors
20	FW	Bernardo Brete		0	0	(Netherlands Antillean Football Union) Trupial

== Costa Rica ==
Head coach: (Uruguay) Rubén Amorín

No.	Pos.	Player	Date of birth (age)	Caps	Goals	Club
1	GK	Hernán Alvarado Guerrero	25 November 1932 (aged 27)	12	0	(Costa Rican Football Federation) Herediano
2	GK	Carlos Alvarado Villalobos	11 December 1927 (aged 32)	6	0	(Costa Rican Football Federation) Alajuelense
3	GK	Felipe Induni	16 August 1940 (aged 19)	0	0	(Costa Rican Football Federation) Saprissa
4	DF	Álvaro Chaves	11 January 1941 (aged 19)	0	0	(Costa Rican Football Federation) Herediano
5	DF	Mario Cordero	7 April 1930 (aged 29)	20	6	(Costa Rican Football Federation) Saprissa
6	DF	Álvaro McDonald	26 January 1938 (aged 22)	0	0	(Costa Rican Football Federation) Herediano
7	DF	Alex Sánchez	20 July 1930 (aged 29)	16	0	(Costa Rican Football Federation) Saprissa
8	DF	Giovanni Rodríguez Chavarría	8 January 1936 (aged 24)	0	0	(Costa Rican Football Federation) Saprissa
9	DF	José Luis Quesada	1 December 1926 (aged 33)	0	0	(Costa Rican Football Federation) Alajuelense
10	MF	Marvin Rodríguez	26 November 1934 (aged 25)	15	1	(Costa Rican Football Federation) Saprissa
11	MF	Tulio Quirós	7 August 1930 (aged 29)	1	0	(Costa Rican Football Federation) Saprissa
12	MF	Edgar Quesada	16 August 1931 (aged 28)	23	1	(Costa Rican Football Federation) Herediano
13	MF	Juan José Gámez	8 July 1939 (aged 20)	0	0	(Costa Rican Football Federation) Alajuelense
14	MF	Guillermo Valenciano	18 October 1939 (aged 20)	0	0	(Costa Rican Football Federation) Saprissa
15	MF	Miguel Cortés	30 July 1939 (aged 20)	0	0	(Costa Rican Football Federation) Saprissa
16	FW	Alberto Armijo	27 September 1926 (aged 33)	5	0	(Costa Rican Football Federation) Cartaginés
17	FW	Juan Ulloa	5 February 1935 (aged 25)	1	1	(Costa Rican Football Federation) Alajuelense
18	FW	Jorge Monge	14 February 1938 (aged 22)	14	10	(Costa Rican Football Federation) Saprissa
19	FW	Rubén Jiménez	9 December 1932 (aged 27)	16	2	(Costa Rican Football Federation) Saprissa
20	FW	Óscar Bejarano	15 September 1932 (aged 27)	3	0	(Costa Rican Football Federation) Herediano
21	FW	Carlos Enrique Herrera	1 January 1936 (aged 24)	0	0	(Costa Rican Football Federation) Alajuelense
22	FW	Guillermo Padilla		0	0	(Costa Rican Football Federation) Uruguay de Coronado
23	FW	Rigoberto Rojas	27 March 1938 (aged 21)	0	0	(Costa Rican Football Federation) Saprissa

== Cuba ==
Head coach: Emilio Muriente

No.	Pos.	Player	Date of birth (age)	Caps	Goals	Club
1	GK	Julio Blanco	18 September 1937 (aged 22)	0	0	(Football Association of Cuba) Deportivo Mordazo
2	GK	Jorge Solís García		0	0	(Football Association of Cuba) Deportivo Mordazo
3	GK	Jorge Pérez Castañeda	27 March 1938 (aged 21)	0	0	(Football Association of Cuba) Juventud Asturiana
4	DF	Agustín Valdés		0	0	(Football Association of Cuba) Lawton
5	DF	Ofren Delgado		0	0	(Football Association of Cuba) Lawton
6	DF	Conrado Paz	22 April 1932 (aged 27)	0	0	(Football Association of Cuba) El Cerro
7	DF	Ramón Álvarez		0	0	(Football Association of Cuba) Juventud Asturiana
8	DF	Mario "Pilillo" Herrera		5	0	(Football Association of Cuba) Juventud Asturiana
9	MF	Ramón Peñalver	31 August 1935 (aged 24)	4	0	(Football Association of Cuba) Deportivo Mordazo
10	MF	Antonio "Tony" Fernández		0	0	(Football Association of Cuba) El Cerro
11	MF	Bernardo Gascón		0	0	(Football Association of Cuba) Deportivo Mordazo
12	MF	Federico García		0	0	(Football Association of Cuba) Lawton
13	MF	Juvenal Reyes		0	0	(Football Association of Cuba) Juventud Asturiana
14	MF	Celedonio Basanta		0	0	(Football Association of Cuba) Lawton
15	FW	Ángel Piedra		8	0	(Football Association of Cuba) Deportivo Mordazo
16	FW	Vicente "Vicentico" Pérez		0	0	(Football Association of Cuba) La Habana
17	FW	Manuel Marco Bobadilla		2	0	(Football Association of Cuba) Deportivo Mordazo
18	FW	Jorge Valdés		0	0	(Football Association of Cuba) Lawton
19	FW	Zenaldo García		3	0	(Football Association of Cuba) Lawton
20	FW	Manuel Miranda		0	0	(Football Association of Cuba) El Cerro
21	FW	Jesús María Valdés		0	0	(Football Association of Cuba) Lawton
22	FW	Lorenzo Valdés		0	0	(Football Association of Cuba) Lawton

== Honduras ==
Head coach: Carlos Padilla

No.	Pos.	Player	Date of birth (age)	Caps	Goals	Club
1	GK	Efraín Salinas		3	0	(National Autonomous Federation of Football of Honduras) Olimpia
2	GK	José León Najarro	1931	0	0	(National Autonomous Federation of Football of Honduras) Hibueras
3	GK	Mariano Aguiluz		0	0	(National Autonomous Federation of Football of Honduras) Boca Juniors
4	DF	Roberto Güity	27 March 1934 (aged 25)	0	0	(National Autonomous Federation of Football of Honduras) Motagua
5	DF	Joaquín Padilla		0	0	(National Autonomous Federation of Football of Honduras)
6	DF	Roy Padilla		4	0	(National Autonomous Federation of Football of Honduras) Olimpia
7	DF	Wilfredo García	12 October 1933 (aged 26)	5	0	(National Autonomous Federation of Football of Honduras) Olimpia
8	DF	Jorge Alberto Solís	3 August 1935 (aged 24)	4	0	(National Autonomous Federation of Football of Honduras) Olimpia
9	DF	Marco Antonio Rosales	1938	0	0	(National Autonomous Federation of Football of Honduras) Olimpia
10	MF	Felipe Barahona		1	0	(National Autonomous Federation of Football of Honduras) Olimpia
11	MF	Ronald Leaky		12	3	(National Autonomous Federation of Football of Honduras) Olimpia
12	MF	Carlos "Rolín" Castillo		0	0	(National Autonomous Federation of Football of Honduras) Olimpia
13	MF	Abraham Pavón		3	0	(National Autonomous Federation of Football of Honduras) Olimpia
14	MF	Carlos Avilés		0	0	(National Autonomous Federation of Football of Honduras) Honduras
15	MF	René Rodríguez Reyes		0	0	(National Autonomous Federation of Football of Honduras) Olimpia
16	MF	Carlos Sarmiento		0	0	(National Autonomous Federation of Football of Honduras) Hibueras
17	MF	Ernesto Henríquez		0	0	(National Autonomous Federation of Football of Honduras) Motagua
18	FW	Rodolfo Godoy	1928 (aged 31–32)	12	9	(National Autonomous Federation of Football of Honduras) Federal
19	FW	Melvin Prince		5	1	(National Autonomous Federation of Football of Honduras) Olimpia
20	FW	Clement Thompson		0	0	(National Autonomous Federation of Football of Honduras) Olimpia
21	FW	Carlos "Leke" Meza		0	0	(National Autonomous Federation of Football of Honduras) Vida
22	FW	Reynaldo Zeyala		9	1	(National Autonomous Federation of Football of Honduras)
23		Alfonso Uclés		0	0	(National Autonomous Federation of Football of Honduras)

== Suriname ==
Head coach: André Kamperveen

No.	Pos.	Player	Date of birth (age)	Caps	Goals	Club
1	GK	Johan Heckbert		0	0	(Surinamese Football Association) Robinhood
2	GK	Harry Blijd		0	0	(Surinamese Football Association) Coronie Boys
3	DF	Ronald Breinburg	8 July 1940 (aged 19)	0	0	(Surinamese Football Association) Transvaal
4	DF	August Wooter	27 March 1934 (aged 25)	0	0	(Surinamese Football Association) Sonny Boys
5	DF	Humbert Boerleider	17 August 1935 (aged 24)	0	0	(Surinamese Football Association) Transvaal
6	DF	André Kamperveen	27 September 1924 (aged 35)	0	0	Free agent
7	MF	Armand Sahadewsing	7 July 1939 (aged 20)	0	0	(Surinamese Football Association) Transvaal
8	MF	Leo Schipper	20 September 1938 (aged 21)	0	0	(Surinamese Football Association) Robinhood
9	MF	Ludwin Beek		0	0	(Surinamese Football Association) Sonny Boys
10	MF	Adolf Poerwo	19 January 1939 (aged 21)	0	0	(Surinamese Football Association) Robinhood
11	MF	Lucien Welles		0	0	(Surinamese Football Association) Voorwaarts
12	MF	Leo Marcet		0	0	(Surinamese Football Association) Sonny Boys
13	FW	August Foe A Man	24 April 1933 (aged 26)	0	0	(Surinamese Football Association) Sonny Boys
14	FW	Gerrit Niekoop		0	0	(Surinamese Football Association) Robinhood
15	FW	Jules Lagadeau	31 July 1939 (aged 20)	0	0	(Surinamese Football Association) Transvaal
16	FW	Tjokosendjojo Kamsoe		0	0	(Surinamese Football Association) De Ster
17	FW	Harold Chyrill		0	0	(Surinamese Football Association) Robinhood
