= Aruban Division di Honor =

Association football league in Aruba

- Founded: 1960
- First season: 1960
- Country: Aruba Football Federation
- Confederation: CONCACAF
- Number of clubs: 10
- Level on pyramid: 1
- Relegation to: Division Uno
- Domestic cup: Torneo Copa Betico Croes
- International cup: CFU Club Shield
- Current champions: Britannia (7th title) (2025–26)
- Most championships: Dakota (17 titles); RCA (17 titles)
- Website: avbaruba.com
- Current: 2026–27

Aruban Division di Honor or Campeonato AVB Aruba Bank is the top level association football league in Aruba. It is overseen by the Arubaanse Voetbal Bond and was created in 1960. Up to and including 1985, the top clubs from Aruba also entered the Kopa Antiano for the championship of the Netherlands Antilles, RCA and Estrella were the only Aruban teams to win that championship in 1965 and 1970.

The winner of the league plays in the CFU Club Shield. The 6-10th place team is taken to the Silver League Poule A or Poule B, a 6-team Round-Robin against the top four of the Division Uno (6 per poule, 2 from Division di Honor, 4 from Division di Honor), then the 1st place of Poule A and B automatically get promoted, the 2nd-3rd placer of both qualify into the promotion playoffs and the winners of the first 2 matches go to the final and the winner of the final gets promoted, and remaining 6 are placed into the Play-Offs Caya 6, the top 4 of the Caya 6 are placed into the Play-Offs Caya 4, and the top 2 are placed into the Grand Final. The championship is usually played between September and June. Most league games take place in front of dozens of spectators.

== Campeonato AVB – Member clubs 2026–27 ==
Location of the 2026–27 Aruban Division di Honor teams

Club	Location
Britannia	Piedra Plat, Paradera
Bubali	Bubali, Noord
Caiquetio	Piedra Plat, Paradera
Dakota	Dakota, Oranjestad
Nacional	Alto Vista, Noord
Estrella	Papilon, Santa Cruz
La Fama	Savaneta
RCA	Solito, Oranjestad
River Plate	Madiki, Oranjestad
Sporting	Ayo, Noord

== Previous winners ==
Ed.	Season	Champion
Hoofdklasse
1	1960	RCA
2	1961	Dakota
3	1962–63	Dakota
4	1963–64	Dakota
5	1964–65	RCA
6	1965–66	Dakota
7	1966–67	Dakota
8	1967–68	RCA
Division Honor
9	1968–69	Estrella
Hoofdklasse
10	1969–70	Dakota
11	1970–71	Dakota
12	1971–72	Dakota
–	1972	No championship
Division Honor
13	1973	Estrella
14	1974	Dakota
15	1975	Bubali
16	1976	Dakota
17	1977	Estrella
18	1978	RCA
19	1979	RCA
20	1980	Dakota
Hoofdklasse
21	1981	Dakota
22	1982	Dakota
Eredivisie
23	1983	Dakota
24	1984	San Luis
25	1985	Estrella
26	1986	RCA
27	1987	RCA
28	1988	Estrella
29	1989	Estrella
30	1990	Estrella
30	1990	RCA
31	1991	RCA
32	1992	Estrella
Division Honor
33	1993	River Plate
34	1994	RCA
35	1995	Dakota
36	1996	Estrella
37	1997	River Plate
Division di Honor
38	1998	Estrella
39	1999	Estrella
40	2000	Nacional
41	2001	Nacional
42	2002	RCA
43	2003–04	Nacional
44	2004–05	Britannia
45	2005–06	Estrella
46	2006–07	Nacional
47	2007–08	RCA
48	2008–09	Britannia
49	2009–10	Britannia
50	2010–11	RCA
51	2011–12	RCA
52	2012–13	La Fama
53	2013–14	Britannia
54	2014–15	RCA
55	2015–16	RCA
56	2016–17	Nacional
57	2017–18	Dakota
58	2018–19	RCA
59	2019–20	Season abandoned due to COVID-19
60	2020–21	Nacional
61	2021–22	Dakota
62	2022–23	RCA
63	2023–24	Britannia
64	2024–25	Britannia
65	2025–26	Britannia

== Performance by club ==
Club	Titles	Seasons won
Dakota	17	1961, 1962–63, 1963–64, 1965–66, 1966–67, 1969–70, 1970–71, 1971–72, 1974, 1976, 1980, 1981, 1982, 1983, 1995, 2017–18, 2021–22
RCA	17	1960, 1964–65, 1967–68, 1978, 1979, 1986, 1987, 1991, 1994, 2002, 2007–08, 2010–11, 2011–12, 2014–15, 2015–16, 2018–19, 2022–23
Estrella	12	1968–69, 1973, 1977, 1985, 1988, 1989, 1990, 1992, 1996, 1998, 1999, 2005–06
Nacional	6	2000, 2001, 2003–04, 2006–07, 2016–17, 2020–21
Britannia	7	2004–05, 2008–09, 2009–10, 2013–14, 2023–24, 2024–25, 2025–26
River Plate	2	1993, 1997
La Fama	1	2012–13
Bubali	1	1975
San Luis	1	1984

== Individual statistics ==
=== Top goalscorers ===
Year	Topscorer(s)	Club(s)	Goals
2002	(Aruba) Jonathan Lake	RCA	43
2003–04	(United States) Benjamin Kee	RCA	7
2005–06	(Aruba) Ronald Gómez	RCA	9
2012–13	(Jamaica) Albert Roy Francis	Nacional	16
2013–14	(United States) Ediz Yorulmazoglu	La Fama	13
2016–17	(Colombia) Devis Oliveros	Nacional	17
2017–18	(Jamaica) Kenroy Ranger	Nacional	18
2018–19	(Aruba) Ronald Gómez	RCA	8
2021–22	(Colombia) Devis Oliveros	Nacional	27
2022–23	(Aruba) Ricky Hodge	Dakota	22
2023–24	(Colombia) Luis M. Torres	Estrella	16
2024–25	(Colombia) John Silva	RCA	20
2025-26	(Aruba) Ricky Hodge	Sporting	15
2025-26	(Colombia) Camilo Peña	Bubali	15

Most goals scored by a player in a season

- 43 goals.
  - Jonathan Lake (2002).

Most goals scored by a player in a single game

- 8 goals
  - Maurice Escalona (RCA) 0-13 against Caravel, 29 February 2008.

=== Multiple hat-tricks ===
Rank	Country	Player	Hat-tricks
1	(Aruba)	Ricky Hodge	7
2	(Colombia)	John Silva	4
3	(Aruba)	Maurice Escalona	3
3	(Colombia)	Devis Oliveros	3
3	(Jamaica)	Kenroy Ranger	3
3	(Venezuela)	Richard Sousa	3
3	(Aruba)	Pieter Susebeek	3
8	(Aruba)	Reangelo Boekhoudt	2
8	(Aruba)	Jonathan Lake	2
8	(Aruba)	Albert Lopez	2
8	(Colombia)	Sebastian Montoya	2
8	(Colombia)	Luis M Torres	2
8	(Aruba)	Norwin Werleman	2

== Women's league ==
Division Damas
- Country: Aruba
- Most championships: Britannia (9 tiles)
- Top scorer: Amy Henao (55 goals)

=== Top goalscorers ===
Season	Player	Team	Goals
2022-23	(Aruba) Tatiana Diornkamp	Britannia	19
2023-24	(Aruba) Amy Henao	RCA	29
2024-25	(Aruba) Amy Henao	Britannia	18
2025-26	(Aruba) Zyanna Rogers	Britannia	16
