= Lesley Felomina =

Aruban footballer (born 1972)

Personal information
- Full name: Lesley Felomina
- Date of birth: December 7, 1972 (age 53)
- Place of birth: Willemstad, Curaçao, Netherlands Antilles
- Height: 1.80 m (5 ft 11 in)
- Positions: Striker; midfielder

Team information
- Current team: Estudiantes (assistant coach)
- Number: 9

Youth career
- Jong Colombia

Senior career*
Years	Team	Apps	(Gls)
1992–1995	Jong Colombia	10	(3)
1995–2000	Sithoc	18	(7)
2000–2001	Estrella	20	(10)
2005–2006	La Fama	12	(8)
2006–2011	Britannia	34	(25)
2011–	Estudiantes	120	(68)
Total		0	(0)

International career
2000–2001	Aruba	4	(3)

Managerial career
- 2021–: Estudiantes (assistant)
- * Club domestic league appearances and goals

Lesley Felomina (born December 7, 1972), known as Lesley, is a Curaçaoan and Aruban footballer who played as a striker or midfielder for Aruban Division Uno club Estudiantes and the Aruba national football team. He played for Aruba during the 2002 FIFA World Cup qualifying rounds.

== Honours ==
Britannia

- Torneo Copa Betico Croes: 2008-09, 2009-10, 2010-11, 2011-12,
