= Ronald Gómez (Aruban footballer) =

Aruban footballer (born 1984)

Personal information
- Full name: Frederick Ronald Gómez
- Date of birth: 25 October 1984 (age 42)
- Place of birth: Oranjestad, Aruba
- Height: 1.85 m (6 ft 1 in)
- Positions: Forward; centre-back

Team information
- Current team: Sporting

Youth career
- 2001–2005: RCA

Senior career*
Years	Team	Apps	(Gls)
2005–2016	RCA		
2016–2017	Rohda Raalte	10	(4)
2017–2023	RCA		
2023–	Sporting		

International career^{‡}
2002–2021	Aruba	22	(6)
- * Club domestic league appearances and goals ‡ National team caps and goals as of 5 June 2021

Frederick Ronald Gómez (born 25 October 1984), known as Ronald Gómez, is an Aruban footballer who plays as a forward for Division di Honor club Sporting.

Gómez spent most of his career with RCA, with whom he won seven league titles and was twice the top scorer in the Division di Honor. He spent the 2016–17 season in the Netherlands with Rohda Raalte, where he was used as a centre-back. He won 22 caps for the Aruba national team between 2002 and 2021 and scored six goals.

== Club career ==
=== RCA ===
Gómez came through the youth system of RCA in Oranjestad. He was the top scorer in the Division di Honor in the 2004–05 season, when RCA topped the league table. RCA won the league title in 2007–08, 2010–11, 2011–12, 2014–15 and 2015–16. He scored in the championship stage in 2011 and again in 2016.

=== Rohda Raalte ===
In the summer of 2016, Gómez moved to the Netherlands to study and joined Hoofdklasse club Rohda Raalte, settling in Zwolle. Rohda used him as a centre-back. On 20 August 2016, he scored twice late on in a 3–1 away win over SVZW in the opening group match of the cup. Head coach Frank Tempelman said neither goal was easy, and that Gómez had created the second himself with a good run and strong use of his body. He made ten league appearances for Rohda that season and scored four goals.

=== Return to RCA ===
Gómez returned to RCA in 2017. He was again the league's top scorer in 2018–19, when RCA won the title by beating Nacional in the final. RCA won another league title in 2022–23.

=== Sporting ===
Gómez later joined Sporting, a club from Ayo then playing in the Division Uno. On 15 June 2024, Sporting beat RCS 3–1 in the Division Uno final. A year later, on 1 June 2025, they lost the Silver League final 5–3 to Riverplate, but were promoted to the Division di Honor for the 2025–26 season. Gómez made 15 league appearances and scored twice in that first top-flight season, and remained in Sporting's squad for 2026–27.

== International career ==
Gómez made his debut for Aruba in 2002. His first goals came in July 2011 in the first round of qualifying for the 2014 World Cup against Saint Lucia. He scored in the 4–2 home win on 8 July and again in the 4–2 defeat in Castries four days later, after which Aruba lost the penalty shoot-out 5–4.

He scored against Dominica in 2012 Caribbean Cup qualifying and against Antigua and Barbuda in 2017 Caribbean Cup qualifying in March 2016. On 9 September 2018, he scored the opening goal in a 3–1 win over Bermuda in qualifying for the 2019–20 CONCACAF Nations League. His last appearance came on 5 June 2021, in a 7–0 defeat to Canada in 2022 World Cup qualifying. He won 22 caps in total, 20 of them in FIFA-recognised matches, and scored six goals.

== Honours ==
RCA

- Aruban Division di Honor: 2007–08, 2010–11, 2011–12, 2014–15, 2015–16, 2018–19, 2022–23
- Torneo Copa Betico Croes: 2011–12, 2015–16, 2021–22

Sporting

- Aruban Division Uno: 2023–24
- Silver League runner-up: 2025

Individual

- Division di Honor top scorer: 2004–05, 2018–19

== Career statistics ==
=== International ===
Aruba
Year	Apps	Goals
2002	1	0
2004	2	0
2011	4	3
2012	3	1
2013	2	0
2015	2	0
2016	2	1
2018	2	1
2019	1	0
2021	3	0
Total	22	6

=== International goals ===
Scores and results list Aruba's goal tally first.

No.	Date	Venue	Opponent	Score	Result	Competition
1.	8 July 2011	Trinidad Stadium, Oranjestad, Aruba	Saint Lucia	3–2	4–2	2014 FIFA World Cup qualification
2.	12 July 2011	Mindoo Phillip Park, Castries, Saint Lucia	Saint Lucia	1–2	2–4 (4–5 p)	2014 FIFA World Cup qualification
3.	4 December 2011	Dr. Ir. Franklin Essed Stadion, Paramaribo, Suriname	Bonaire	2–2	2–2 (3–4 p)	2011 ABCS Tournament
4.	25 September 2012	Kensington Oval, Bridgetown, Barbados	Dominica	2–2	2–3	2012 Caribbean Cup qualification
5.	23 March 2016	Sir Vivian Richards Stadium, North Sound, Antigua and Barbuda	Antigua and Barbuda	1–2	1–2	2017 Caribbean Cup qualification
6.	9 September 2018	Ergilio Hato Stadium, Willemstad, Curaçao	Bermuda	1–0	3–1	2019–20 CONCACAF Nations League qualification
