= Football in Aruba =

- Country: Aruba
- Governing body: Aruba Football Federation
- National teams: Men's national team Women's national team

National competitions
- Division di Honor (Men's Level 1); Division Uno (Men's Level 2); Damas Open (Women's); Youth leagues (U-20 to U-5)

International competitions
- CONCACAF Champions League; CONCACAF League; Caribbean Club Shield; FIFA Club World Cup; CONCACAF Gold Cup (National Team); CONCACAF Nations League (National Team); FIFA World Cup (National Team); CONCACAF Women's Championship (National Team); FIFA Women's World Cup (National Team)

Association football is a common sport in Aruba. It has a two-tier national league system for men's clubs and a single-tier women's club system. Both the men's and women's national teams are members of FIFA, but are generally ranked near the bottom of the FIFA World Rankings.

== History ==
The first known football team in Aruba was the Aruba Voetbal Vereniging, formed in 1909 after a local businessman bought a football. Teams popped up across the island over time, especially in schools. By 1921, there was enough interest to organize a tournament, won by Club Wilhelmina. In 1924, Sparta, a Curaçaoan team, visited Aruba and played a friendly against the Aruban team Vitesse.

In 1930, a national team was organized, and played their first international match against Curaçao. The Arubaanse Voetbal Bond (Aruba Football Federation; AVB), which governs football on the island, formed in late 1930 and became an official organization in 1932. From the 1950s to the 1980s, Aruban football existed under the umbrella of the Netherlands Antillean Football Union (NAVU). In 1986, Aruba changed from a member of the Netherlands Antilles to its own constituent country of the Netherlands. With this change in political status, the AVB was granted membership to CONCACAF in 1986 and to FIFA in 1988. The AVB is currently a member of FIFA, CONCACAF, and the Caribbean Football Union.

== Men's league system ==
Level	League(s)/Division(s)
1	Aruban Division di Honor (A-Series, Gold Series or First Division). --> 10 clubs
2	Aruban Division Uno (B-Series, Silver Series or Second Division). --> 14 clubs

The national league competition, the Aruban Division di Honor, was established in 1960. The most successful teams since 1960 have been SV Dakota and SV Racing Club Aruba with 17 titles and SV Estrella with twelve. Until 1985 Aruban clubs also entered the Netherlands Antilles Championship with two winning, SV Racing Club Aruba in 1965 and SV Estrella in 1970.

As of the 2022-23 season, the Aruban league system uses a variant of a split season schedule. Both divisions play a half season schedule, after which the teams split based on their records in the first half. The top six teams in the Division di Honor play the second half in the Gold Series, with the champion out of those six teams being the overall Division di Honor champion. The remaining teams in the Division di Honor play the second half in the Silver Series, against teams from Division Uno. The Silver Series provides promotion and relegation between the divisions. It comprises the bottom four teams from the Division di Honor and the top eight teams in Division Uno. The four best teams in the Silver Series are promoted to the Division di Honor the next season, and the remainder are relegated to Division Uno.

Since 2005, the AVB has operated the Betico Croes Cup for men's teams. SV Britannia has been the most successful team in the cup, winning eight of the 22 tournaments.

== International ==
The first national team match for the Aruba national football team took place against Curaçao in 1930. Until 1986, Aruban players officially represented the Netherlands Antilles national football team. Aruba joined CONCACAF and the Caribbean Football Union in 1986, and FIFA two years later.

Aruba's men's national team has competed in the FIFA World Cup qualifiers eight times, including in 2026. However, neither the men's nor women's national teams have advanced past the qualifying stages for the FIFA World Cup, the CONCACAF Gold Cup, or the Caribbean Cup. The men's team has competed in the CONCACAF Nations League.

In the FIFA World Rankings, the men's team is ranked 189 ▲2 (1 April 2026) and the women's team is ranked 183 ▲3 (21 April 2026).

== Football stadiums in Aruba ==
Stadium	Capacity	City
Trinidad Stadium	5,500	Oranjestad
CD Frans Figaroa	1,500	Noord, Aruba

== See also ==
- Aruba national football team results
- Aruba Football Federation
