= Ricangel de Leça =

Aruban footballer and referee

Refereeing career
- Full name: Ricangel Emilio de Leça
- Born: 1 August 1981 (age 45); Aruba
International
Years	League	Role
2015–	FIFA listed	Referee
Association football career
- Position: Defender
Senior career*
Years	Team	Apps	(Gls)
2008–2011	La Fama		
2011–2013	Dakota	21	(0)
International career
2010–2012	Aruba	5	(0)
- * Club domestic league appearances and goals

Ricangel Emilio de Leça (born 1 August 1981) is an Aruban football referee and former player. He became a FIFA List referee in 2015.

Before becoming an international referee, de Leça played as a defender for the Aruba national team, and Aruban clubs SV La Fama and SV Dakota.
