= Estudiantes =

Estudiantes (in English: students) is the name of different sports clubs in the Spanish-speaking world:

== Argentina ==
- Estudiantes de La Plata, sports club based in La Plata, Buenos Aires Province
- Estudiantes de Buenos Aires, football club based in Caseros, Buenos Aires Province
- Estudiantes de Río Cuarto, football club based in Río Cuarto, Córdoba Province
- Estudiantes de Paraná, multi-sports club based in Paraná, Entre Ríos Province
- Estudiantes de Bahía Blanca, basketball club based in Bahía Blanca, Buenos Aires Province
- Estudiantes de Olavarría, basketball club based in Olavarría, Buenos Aires Province

== Other countries ==
- CB Estudiantes, Spanish basketball club
- Estudiantes de Mérida, Venezuelan sports club
- Estudiantes de Medicina, Peruvian football club
- Estudiantes de Altamira, Mexican football club
- Estudiantes Tecos, Mexican football club, formerly known as Tecos UAG
  - Estudiantes Tecos Reserves, the club's reserves team
- Estudiantes F.C., Salvadoran football club
- SV Estudiantes, Aruban football club

== Other uses ==
- El estudiante, 2009 Mexican film
- El estudiante (2011 film), 2011 Argentine film
- El estudiante de Salamanca, work by José de Espronceda
