= CD Rooi Afo =

Rooi Afo
- Full name: Centro Deportivo Rooi Afo
- Nickname: The Caimans
- Short name: Rooi Afo
- Founded: 1981; 45 years ago
- Ground: Centro Deportivo Rooi Afo Field
- Capacity: 1,100
- President: (Aruba) Rayon Dirksz
- Manager: (Aruba) Leo Kock
- League: Division Uno
- 2025/26: 1st, Division Uno
- Website: Website
Home colours	Away colours	Third colours

Centro Deportivo Rooi Afo (Dutch:Sport Sportcentrum), known as CD Rooi Afo or simply Rooi Afo is an Aruban association football club based in the Rooi Afo neighborhood, located near Paradera. The club currently plays in the Aruban Division Uno.

== History ==
The club was founded in 1981.

== Official Matches Stadium ==
- Guillermo Prospero Trinidad Stadium
- Centro Deportivo Frans Figaroa

== Honours ==
Competitions	Titles	Seasons
Division Uno	3	1981, 2024–25, 2025–26
