= SV Sportboys =

Sport Boys
- Full name: Sport Vereniging Sport Boys
- Nicknames: The White Blue Sharks; The White Blue; Angochi Boys
- Short name: Club Sport Boys
- Founded: October 1960; 65 years ago
- Ground: Guillermo P. Trinidad Stadium; Oranjestad, Aruba
- Capacity: 5,500
- President: (Aruba) N/A
- Head Coach: (Aruba) Patrick Lampe
- League: Aruban Division Uno
- 2022–23: Division Uno, runner-up
- Website: https://sportboys.arubafc.com/
Home colours	Away colours	Third colours

Sport Vereniging Sport Boys (English:Sports Club) known as SV Sport Boys or simply Sport Boys is an Aruban football club based in Santa Cruz/Angochi, that competes in Division Uno, the second tier of the Aruban football league.

== Achievements ==
- Aruban Division Uno: 1

1963–64

- Finalist: 2

2022–23, 2024–25

- Torneo Copa Betico Croes: 1

2004–05

- Koningin Juliana Beker (Copa Juliana): 1

1973

== Players ==
=== Current squad ===
As of 10 September 2023

Note: Flags indicate national team as defined under FIFA eligibility rules; some limited exceptions apply. Players may hold more than one non-FIFA nationality.

No.	Pos.	Nation	Player
1	GK	ARU	Frederick Koolman (Vice-captain)
2	DF	ARU	Christopher Peña
3	DF	ARU	Franklyn Sneek
4	DF	ARU	Jean Dirksz
5	DF	ARU	Victor Maduro
6	FW	ARU	Joyson Rasmijn
7	FW	ARU	Andre Koolman
8	DF	ARU	Bryan Agunbero
9	FW	ARU	Romeo Fuentes
10	FW	ARU	Jaisley Boekhoudt (captain)
11	FW	ARU	Julio Dirks

No.	Pos.	Nation	Player
12	DF	ARU	Jorick Mackay
13	MF	ARU	Gerald Moreta
14	MF	ARU	Carlos Santana
15	FW	ARU	Jesiray Mackay (Vice-captain)
16	FW	ARU	Sidney Geerman
17	MF	ARU	Patrick Lampe (Vice-captain)
18	FW	ARU	Igmar Kelly
19	FW	ARU	Richmar Kelly

=== Current technical staff ===
Position	Staff
Head coach	(Aruba) Patrick Lampe
Assistant coach	(Aruba) N/A
Goalkeeping coach	(Aruba) Jorick Mackay
