= SV San Nicolas =

FC San Nicolas
- Full name: Football Club San Nicolas
- Nicknames: The Lions, The Pride
- Short name: FC San Nicolas
- Founded: 2006; 20 years ago
- Ground: Joe Laveist Sport Park
- Capacity: 2000
- President: (Aruba)
- Head Coach: (Aruba)
- League: Aruban Division Uno
- 2024–25: 5th
- Website: Website
Home colours	Away colours	Third colours

Football Club San Nicolas (English: Sports Club) (known as FC San Nicolas ) or simply San Nicolas is an Aruban football club from San Nicolaas the country's second-largest city, which currently play in Aruba's second division, Division Uno.

== History ==
The club was founded in 2006.

== Stadium ==
The club plays its home matches at the Joe Laveist Sport Park.

== Official Matches Stadium ==
- Guillermo Prospero Trinidad Stadium
- Centro Deportivo Frans Figaroa

=== Gallery ===
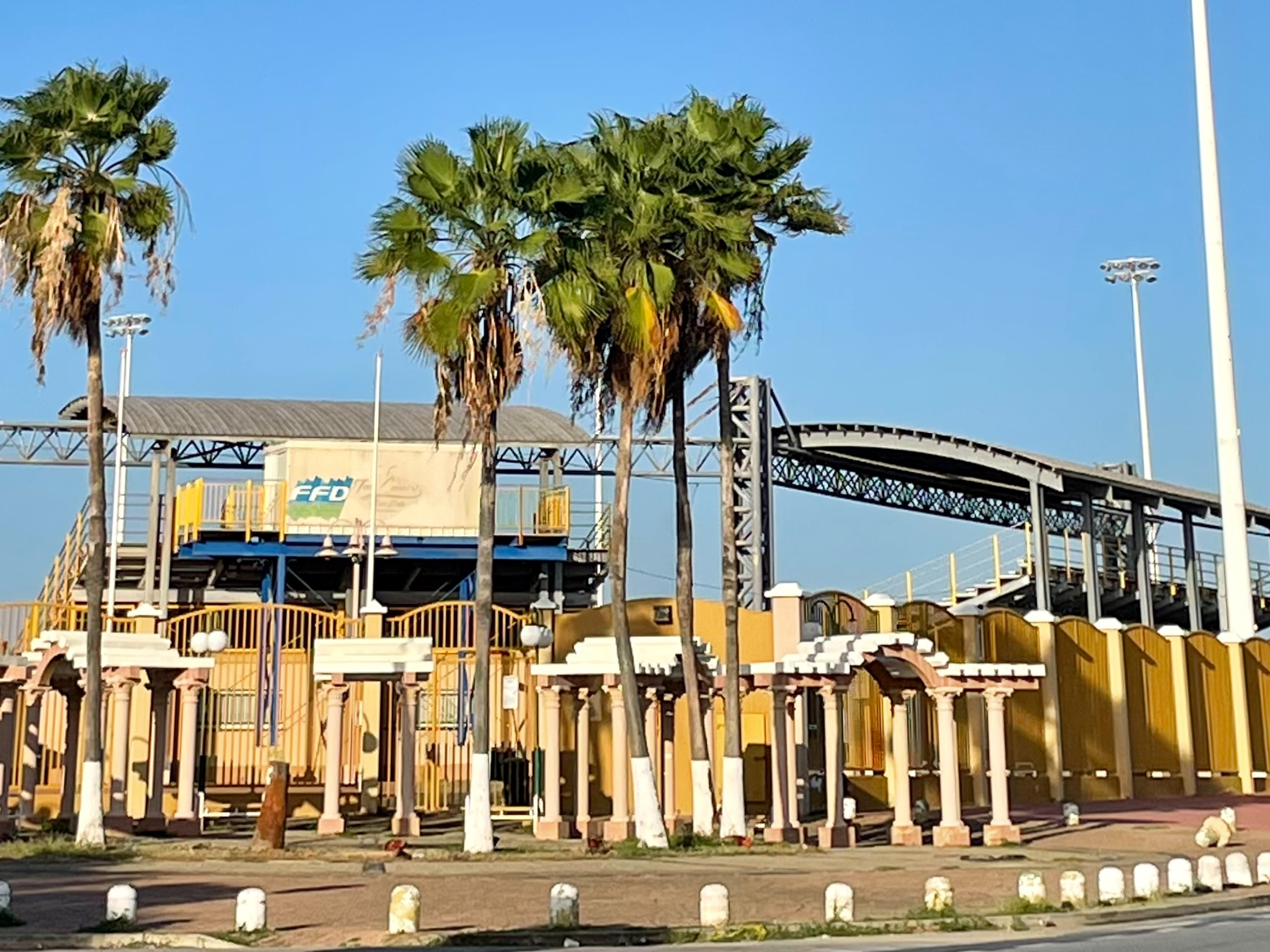

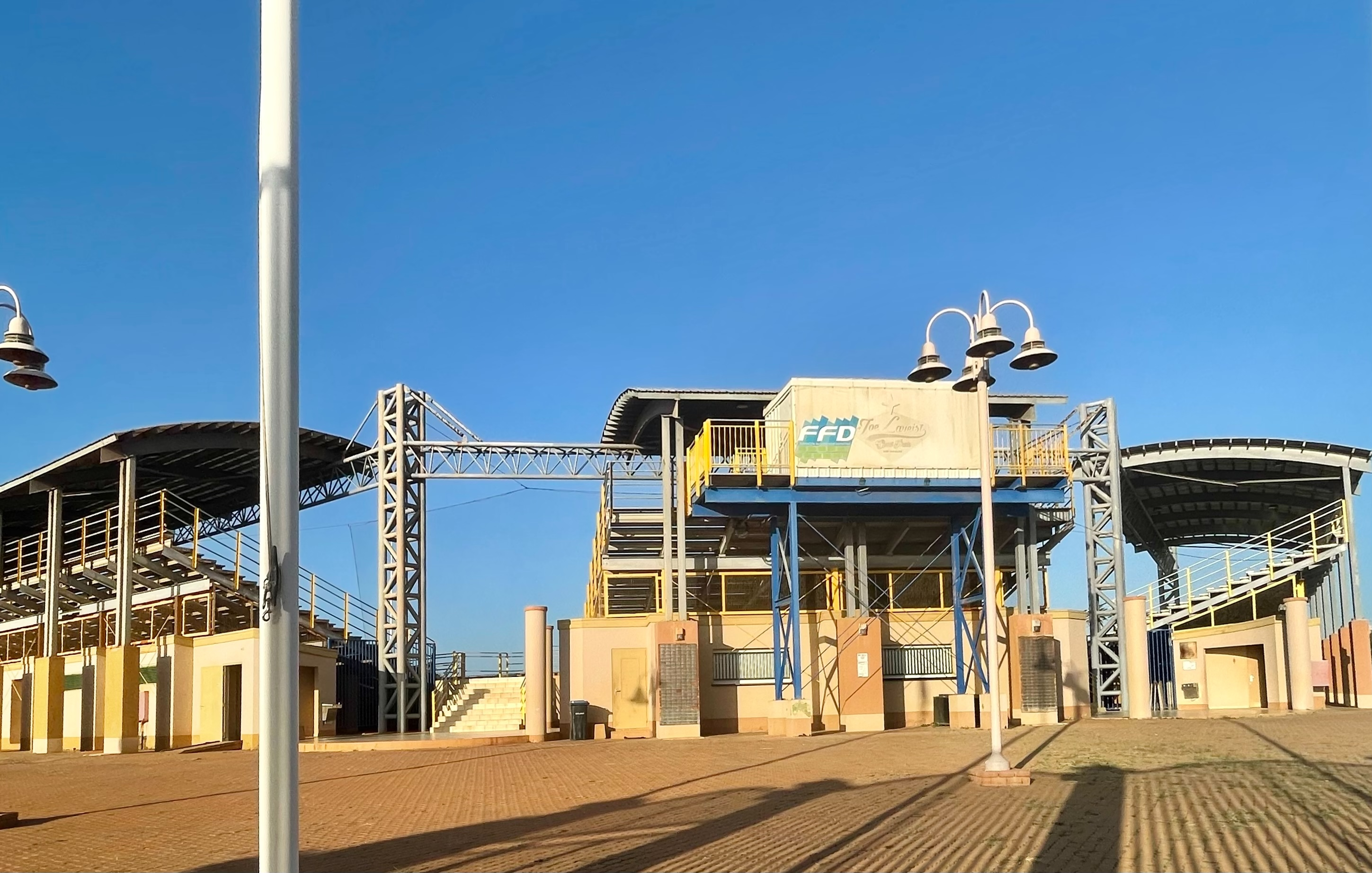
