= SV Trupial =

Trupial
- Full name: Sport Vereniging Trupial
- Nicknames: The Trupial; The Birds; The Black Orange
- Short name: Trupial
- Founded: 10 April 1938; 87 years ago (refounded 1958)
- Ground: Guillermo P. Trinidad Stadium; Oranjestad, Aruba
- Capacity: 5,500
- President: (Aruba) Lysander Besselink
- Head Coach: (Aruba) Piet Correa
- League: Aruban Division Uno
- 2010–11: 4th,
- Website: https://www.svtrupial.com/
| Home colours | Away colours | Third colours |

Sport Vereniging Trupial (English:Sports Club), known as SV Trupial or Trupial, is an Aruban football club based in Oranjestad, which plays in Division Uno, the second tier of the national league. The team was formed in 1938.

== Achievements ==
- Aruban Division Uno: 1

2007-08
