= Aruban Division Uno =

- Country: Aruba Football Federation
- Confederation: CONCACAF
- Number of clubs: 14
- Level on pyramid: 2
- Promotion to: Division di Honor
- Relegation to: Division Dos (before 2017) None (since 2017–18)
- Domestic cup: Copa Betico Croes
- Current champions: Rooi Afo (3 titles) ( 2025-26)
- Most championships: Brazil Juniors (5 titles)
- Website: Division Uno
- Current: 2026–27

The Aruban Division Uno (English: Aruban First Division) is the second tier of football in Aruba. Since 2022-23 season, the top 4 team in each group of the league will enter the promotion/relegation playoff along with the bottom 4 team from the Division di Honor.

== Clubs 2025/26 ==
The following Twelve clubs participated in the First Division during the 2025-26 season.

Pool B:

- Caiquetio
- FC San Nicolas
- Sport Boys
- Estudiantes
- Jong Aruba
- RCS

Pool A:

- Unistars
- Atlantico
- Rooi Afo
- Brazil Juniors
- Caravel
- Master Boys

== Clubs 2024/25 ==
The following fourteen clubs participated in the First Division during the 2024-25 season.

Pool A:

- Atlantico
- Real Koyari
- Sporting
- Estudiantes
- Bubali
- Caravel
- Arsenal
- RCS

Pool B:

- San Nicolas
- Caiquetio
- Rooi Afo
- Sport Boys
- Brazil Juniors
- Master Boys

== Clubs 2023/24 ==
The following sixteen clubs participated in the First Division during the 2023-24 season.

Pool A:

- Atlantico
- Real Koyari
- Sporting
- Estudiantes
- Jong Aruba
- Caravel
- Arsenal
- RCS

Pool B:

- Unistars
- San Nicolas
- United
- Rooi Afo
- Sport Boys
- Brazil Juniors
- Juventud TL
- Undesa

== Clubs 2022/23 ==
The following sixteen clubs participated in the First Division during the 2022-23 season.

Pool A:

- Atlantico
- Real Koyari
- Sporting
- Estudiantes
- Jong Aruba
- Bubali
- Arsenal
- RCS

Pool B:

- Unistars
- San Nicolas
- Caiquetio
- Rooi Afo
- Sport Boys
- Brazil Juniors
- Juventud TL
- Undesa

== Clubs 2021/22 ==
The following fourteen clubs participated in the First Division during the 2021-22 season.

Pool A:

- Sporting
- Unistars
- Caiquetio
- Estudiantes
- Real Koyari
- Jong Aruba
- Arsenal

Pool B:

- Santa Fe
- San Nicolas
- RCS
- Rooi Afo
- Sport Boys
- Atlantico
- Juventud TL

== Clubs 2019/20 ==
The following fifteen clubs participated in the First Division during the 2019-20 season.

Pool A:

- Caiquetio
- River Plate
- Sport Boys
- San Nicolas
- RCS
- Sporting
- Atlantico
- Estudiantes

Pool B:

- Arsenal
- Jong Aruba
- Unistars
- Real Koyari
- Juventud TL
- Rooi Afo
- Undesa

== Clubs 2016/17 ==
The following ten clubs participated in the First Division during the 2016-17 season.

- Atlantico
- Brazil Juniors
- Caiquetio
- Juventud TL
- RCS
- Real Piedra Plat
- San Nicolas
- Sport Boys
- Sporting
- United

== Champions ==
Season	Champion
1960	River Plate
1961	San Nicolas Juniors
1962-63	Millionarios
1963-64	Sport Boys
1964-65	Tropical
1965-66	Bubali
1966-67	Aruba Juniors
1967-68	Jong Aruba
1968-69	Tropical
1969-70	San Nicolas Juniors
1970-71	Atlantico
1971-72	Unknown
1973	La Fama
1974-80	Unknown
1981	Rooi Afo
1982	Unknown
1983	Universal
1984-88	Unknown
1989	San Nicolas Juniors
1990	Brazil Juniors
1991-92	Unknown
1993	Nacional
1994-97	Unknown
1998	Juventud TL
1999	Brazil Juniors
2000	Jong Aruba
2001	Britannia
2002	La Fama
2003-04	Unknown
2004-05	Caiquetio
2005-06	Juventud TL
2006-07	River Plate
2007-08	Trupial
2008-09	Brazil Juniors
2009-10	Caravel
2010-11	Dakota
2011-12	Caiquetio
2012-13	Caravel
2013-14	Brazil Juniors
2014-15	Caravel
2015-16	Jong Aruba
2016-17	Real Piedra Plat
2017-18	Brazil Juniors
2018-19	Independiente Porto Caravel
2019-20	Abandoned due to COVID-19 pandemic
2021	Unofficial championship
2021-22	Santa Fe
2022-23	Jong Aruba
2023-24	Sporting
2024-25	Rooi Afo
2025-26	Rooi Afo

== Team championships ==
Club	Champion	Champion years
Brazil Juniors	5	1990, 1999, 2009, 2014, 2018
Caravel	4	2010, 2013, 2015, 2019
Jong Aruba	4	1968, 2000, 2016, 2022-23
San Nicolas Juniors	3	1961, 1970, 1989
Rooi Afo	3	1981, 2025, 2026
Tropical	2	1965, 1969
Juventud TL	2	1998, 2006
La Fama	2	1973, 2002
River Plate	2	1960, 2007
Caiquetio	2	2005, 2012
Millionarios	1	1963
Sport Boys	1	1964
Bubali	1	1966
Aruba Juniors	1	1967
Atlantico	1	1970
Nacional	1	1993
Britannia	1	2001
Trupial	1	2008
Dakota	1	2011
Real Piedra Plat	1	2017
Independiente Porto Caravel	1	2019
Santa Fe	1	2022
Sporting	1	2023-24
Universal	1	1983
