= Torneo Copa Betico Croes =

Copa Betico Croes
- Organiser(s): Aruba Football Federation
- Founded: 2005
- Region: Aruba
- Teams: 24
- Current champions: Dakota (4th title)
- Most championships: Britannia (8 titles)
- Broadcaster(s): Nos Isla TV; FIFA+
- Website: Copa Betico Croes
- 2026 Copa Betico

The Copa Betico Croes (English: Betico Croes Cup) known as Torneo Copa Betico Croes, or simply Copa Betico is the top knockout tournament of the Aruban football teams organized by the Aruba Football Federation.

== Finals ==
Year	Final host	Winner	Runner-up	Score
2005	Guiilermo Trinidad Stadium; Oranjestad, Aruba	Sport Boys	Sporting	3–1
2006	Guiilermo Trinidad Stadium; Oranjestad, Aruba	Estudiantes	Nacional	1–0
2007	Guiilermo Trinidad Stadium; Oranjestad, Aruba	Dakota	Estrella	2–1
2008	Guiilermo Trinidad Stadium; Oranjestad, Aruba	Britannia	Nacional	3–2
2009	Guiilermo Trinidad Stadium; Oranjestad, Aruba	Britannia	Estrella	1–1 (4–3 p)
2010	Guiilermo Trinidad Stadium; Oranjestad, Aruba	Britannia	La Fama	2–0
2011	Guiilermo Trinidad Stadium; Oranjestad, Aruba	Britannia	Bubali	4–1
2012	Guiilermo Trinidad Stadium; Oranjestad, Aruba	RCA	Dakota	5–1
2013	Guiilermo Trinidad Stadium; Oranjestad, Aruba	Britannia	RCA	1–0
2014	Guiilermo Trinidad Stadium; Oranjestad, Aruba	Estrella	RCA	1–1 (7–6 p)
2015	Guiilermo Trinidad Stadium; Oranjestad, Aruba	Britannia	Bubali	5–0
2016	Guiilermo Trinidad Stadium; Oranjestad, Aruba	RCA	Britannia	3–1
2017	Guiilermo Trinidad Stadium; Oranjestad, Aruba	Britannia	Dakota	2–1
2018	Guiilermo Trinidad Stadium; Oranjestad, Aruba	Estrella	Dakota	1–0
2019	Guiilermo Trinidad Stadium; Oranjestad, Aruba	Dakota	Porto-Caravel	4–0
2020	Guiilermo Trinidad Stadium; Oranjestad, Aruba	RCA	Dakota	3–1
2021	Guiilermo Trinidad Stadium; Oranjestad, Aruba	RCA	La Fama	7–0
2022	Guiilermo Trinidad Stadium; Noord, Aruba	RCA	La Fama	1–0
2023	Guiilermo Trinidad Stadium; Oranjestad, Aruba	Britannia	Nacional	1–0
2024	Complejo Deportivo Frans Figaroa; Noord, Aruba	Nacional	Dakota	2–0
2025	Complejo Deportivo Frans Figaroa; Noord, Aruba	Dakota	Nacional	6–0
2026	CD Guillermo Trinidad, Dakota	Dakota	La Fama	4–2

== Winners ==
Club	Winners	Runners-up	Winning years
Britannia	8	1	2008, 2009, 2010, 2011, 2013, 2015, 2017, 2023
RCA	5	2	2012, 2016, 2020, 2021, 2022
Dakota	4	5	2007, 2019, 2025, 2026
Estrella	2	2	2014, 2018
Sport Boys	1	0	2005
Estudiantes	1	0	2006
Nacional	1	4	2024
La Fama	0	4	
Bubali	0	2	
Independiente Caravel	0	1	
Sporting	0	1	
