= SV Estudiantes =

Estudiantes Maritimo
- Full name: Sport Vereniging Estudiantes Maritimo Aruba
- Nicknames: The students The Maritime; Black Red White
- Short name: Estudiantes
- Founded: 15 December 1958; 67 years ago
- Ground: Guillermo P. Trinidad Stadium; Oranjestad, Aruba
- Capacity: 5,500
- President: (Aruba) Rayanne Davelaar
- Head Coach: (Aruba) Raymond Davelaar
- League: Aruban Division Uno
- 2022–23: Division Uno, 6th, Group B Silver League
- Website: https://www.facebook.com/svestudiantsmaritimo58
| Home colours | Away colours | Third colours |

Sport Vereniging Estudiantes Maritimo (English: Sports Club) (known as SV Estudiantes Aruba) or simply Estudiantes is an Aruban football club based in Oranjestad, which currently play in Aruba's second division, Division Uno.

== Achievements ==
- Copa Betico Croes: 1

2006

== Players ==
=== Current squad ===
As of 28 October 2023

Note: Flags indicate national team as defined under FIFA eligibility rules; some limited exceptions apply. Players may hold more than one non-FIFA nationality.

| No. | Pos. | Nation | Player |
|---|---|---|---|
| 1 | GK | ARU | Luis Molina (Vice-captain) |
| 2 | DF | ARU | Rhadames Roos |
| 3 | DF | ARU | Richnel Maria |
| 4 | DF | ARU | Giancarlo Croes |
| 5 | DF | ARU | Jemy Roos |
| 6 | FW | ARU | Jhonnathan Navas |
| 7 | FW | ARU | Shamir Wefer |
| 8 | DF | ARU | Gadiel Geerman |
| 9 | FW | ARU | Juean Orman |
| 10 | FW | COL | Camilo Escobar (Vice-captain) |
| 11 | FW | ARU | Rishwan Boekhoudt |

| No. | Pos. | Nation | Player |
|---|---|---|---|
| 12 | DF | ARU | Roland Tromp |
| 13 | MF | ARU | Ryan Bregita |
| 14 | MF | ARU | Zhayron Davelaar (captain) |
| 15 | FW | ARU | Leslie Priest |
| 16 | FW | COL | Yilber Ramirez |
| 17 | MF | ARU | Mervin Richardson |
| 18 | FW | ARU | Vyron Tromp |
| 19 | FW | ARU | Jorge Maduro |
| 20 | FW | ARU | Lesley Felomina (Vice-captain) |
| 21 | FW | ARU | Sigmar Maduro |
