= SV Britannia =

SV Britannia Aruba
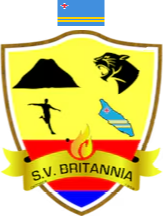
- Full name: Sport Vereniging Britannia
- Nicknames: Pumanan di Piedra Plat; Paradera
- Founded: 12 October 1958
- Ground: Compleho Deportivo Franklyn Bareño; Piedra Plat, Aruba
- Capacity: 500
- Chairman: Cedric Werleman
- League: Aruban Division di Honor
- 2025–26: Champions
Home colours	Away colours

Sport Vereniging Britannia is an Aruban professional football club, which currently plays in Aruban Division di Honor. They are based in Piedra Plat.

== History ==
SV Britannia was founded on 12 October 1958, when an official football team was organised for the local youngsters in Piedra Plat and vicinity. The colors of SV Britannia was chosen in the first board meeting: yellow and red. They played their first game in 1960, when beating Vitesse Cashero 3–1. The first board members were; Daniel "Vale" Croes, Henry "Henriche" Croes, Ripoldo Croes, Roland "Rolly" Bareño, Alfredo "Fechi" Bareño, Serapio "Jati" Weller, Joanquin Werleman, Hipolito "Poli" Pereira and Marcolino "Cholin" Erasmus.

SV Britannia promoted to the highest division (Division di Honor) in 2001. They clinched the league title so far in 2004–05, 2008–09, 2009–10, 2012–13, 2023-24 and subsequently took part in the 2006, 2007 and 2009 CFU Club Championship in an attempt to qualify for the CONCACAF Champions Cup.

== Results ==
=== International ===
Results list SV Britannia's goal tally first.

Win Draw Loss Fixture

Competition	Round	Club	Score
2005 CFU Club Championship	First Round	(Suriname) Robinhood	1–2
2005 CFU Club Championship	First Round	(Suriname) Robinhood	0–2
2006 CFU Club Championship	First Round	(United States Virgin Islands) New Vibes	1–1
2006 CFU Club Championship	First Round	(Trinidad and Tobago) San Juan Jabloteh	0–8
2006 CFU Club Championship	First Round	(Antigua and Barbuda) SAP	1–7
2009 CFU Club Championship	First Round	(Haiti) Cavaly	0–5
2009 CFU Club Championship	First Round	(Haiti) Cavaly	0–1
2025 CFU Club Shield	Group Stage	(Grenada) Paradise International	1–1
2025 CFU Club Shield	Group Stage	(Saint Kitts and Nevis) St. Paul's United	2–0
2026 CFU Club Shield	Round of 16	(Barbados) Weymouth Wales	1–1

== Staff members ==
- D.T.: Venezuela Renier Paraez
- D.T.Ass: Aruba Gregory Tromp
- D.T. Ass : Venezuela Lerjan Caceres
- Physical trainer: Colombia Luis Murillo
- Ass. Physical trainer: (Colombia) Juan E. Angulo Largacha
- Physiotherapist: Colombia Gustavo Rojas
- Physiotherapist: Venezuela Angela Maria Figueroa
- Team manager : Aruba Lisa Montero
- Administration : Aruba Lisette Werleman
- President : Aruba Cedric Werleman

== Achievements ==
- Aruban Division di Honor: 7

2004–05, 2008–09, 2009–10, 2013–14, 2023–24, 2024–25, 2025–26

- Torneo Copa Betico Croes: 9

2007–08, 2008–09, 2009–10, 2010–11, 2012–13, 2014–15, 2016–17

2007–08 : SV Britannia 3–2 SV Deportivo Nacional
2008–09 : SV Britannia 1–1 SV Estrella (4–3 pk)
2009–10 : SV Britannia 2–0 SV La Fama
2010–11 : SV Britannia 4–1 SV Bubali
2012–13 : SV Britannia 1–0 SV Racing Club Aruba
2014–15 : SV Britannia 5–0 SV Bubali
2012–13 : SV Britannia 3–1 SV Racing Club Aruba
2016–17 : SV Britannia 2–1 SV Dakota
2022–23 : SV Britannia 1–0 SV Deportivo Nacional

- Copa ABC (Copa Antillana): 1

2024

== Current squad ==
As of May 2025

Note: Flags indicate national team as defined under FIFA eligibility rules; some limited exceptions apply. Players may hold more than one non-FIFA nationality.

No.	Pos.	Nation	Player
1	GK	ARU	Josthan Maduro
2	DF	ARU	Ashton Charles
3	DF	ARU	Edhyon Hersilia
4	DF	ARU	Gregorio van der Biezen
6	MF	ARU	Johnatan Ruiz
7	FW	ARU	Pieter Susebeek
8	MF	ARU	Ehtan Tromp
9	FW	VEN	MIguel Alberto Vielma Moreno
10	MF	ARU	Stiven Melchor Rua
11	FW	VEN	Richard Fernando de Sousa
12	FW	ARU	Reangelo Boekhoudt
14	DF	COL	Edgardo Peralta
15	DF	ARU	Zeshawn Supriana
16	FW	VEN	Luis Jose Estrada Avendaño
17	FW	COL	Sebastian Montoya Cano
18	DF	CUW	Alden Merite
19	MF	ARU	Noa Kolman

No.	Pos.	Nation	Player
20	DF	ARU	Jeremy Trimon
21	GK	ARU	Ziyon Croes
23	DF	COL	Juan E. Angulo Largacha
24	DF	COL	Jian Burgos
25	DF	CUW	Germain G. Geerman
26	DF	ARU	Websther Merveile
27	FW	ARU	Jaime Torres Quispe
28	MF	ARU	Ashwin Rodney Falcon
30	FW	COL	Moises Araque Obduver
32	GK	ARU	Kendrick Dania
33	DF	COL	Alejandro J. Ramirez C.
40	DF	ARU	David Dubero
41	DF	ARU	Thair Banjamin Thode
42	DF	GRN	Rolston Jeffery
55	MF	ARU	Ludwig Molenaar
63	MF	ARU	Moises Castro
71	MF	COL	Jorge E. Aponza Balanta

== Notable former players ==
- Kendrick Dania
- Eldrick Celaire
- Jonathan Lake
- Elvin Poppen
- Lesley Felomina
- Erwin Croes
- Rodney Lake
- Mark Mackay
- Theric Ruiz
- Juan Valdez
- Robbie Croes
