= SV Juventud Tanki Leendert =

Juventud Tanki Leendert
- Full name: Sport Vereniging Juventud Tanki Leendert
- Nicknames: The Aruban Bison; The Buffalo; The Bulls
- Short name: Juventud TL; SVJTL; JTL
- Founded: 13 September 1990; 35 years ago
- Ground: Guillermo P. Trinidad Stadium; Oranjestad, Aruba
- Capacity: 5,500
- President: (Aruba) Roland de Cuba
- Head Coach: (Colombia) Cesar Arias
- League: Aruban Division Uno
- 2023–24, 2024–25: Division Uno, 11th, Group B (23–24), withdrew/not included (24–25)
- Website: https://www.facebook.com/svJTL/
Home colours	Away colours	Third colours

Sport Vereniging Juventud Tanki Leendert (English:Sports Club), known as Juventud TL or JTL, is an Aruban football club based in Tanki Leendert, which currently plays in Division Uno, the second tier of the national league.

The club was founded in 1990.

== Achievements ==
- Aruban Division Uno: 1

2005–06

== Players ==
=== Current squad ===
As of 10 September 2023

Note: Flags indicate national team as defined under FIFA eligibility rules; some limited exceptions apply. Players may hold more than one non-FIFA nationality.

No.	Pos.	Nation	Player
1	GK	ARU	Antonio Giel (Vice-captain)
2	DF	ARU	Edgar Lugo
3	DF	ARU	Luis Jimenez
4	DF	ARU	Kevin Hereira
5	DF	ARU	Shentel Kelly
6	FW	ARU	Aldrick Jacobs
7	FW	ARU	Diego Romero
8	DF	ARU	Jhosimar Pantoja
9	FW	ARU	Yoshimar Pantoja
10	FW	ARU	Jorginho Petrocchi (captain)
11	FW	ARU	Cesar Bengrok
12	DF	ARU	Andres Caicedo Karol

No.	Pos.	Nation	Player
13	MF	COL	Freddy Goyburo
14	MF	ARU	Junior Tromp
15	FW	ARU	Adolfo Genser
16	FW	ARU	Dominicus Kelly
17	MF	DOM	Junior Arismendy (Vice-captain)
18	DF	ARU	Jim Carlos Mori
19	MF	ARU	Richard Tromp
20	DF	ARU	Brandon Salomon
21	MF	ARU	Samuel de Solano (Vice-captain)
22	DF	ARU	Rodney Conradus
23	FW	COL	David Goyburo
24	FW	COL	Luis Cardona

=== Current technical staff ===
Position	Staff
Head coach	(Colombia) Cesar Arias
Assistant coach	(Aruba) Gino Petrocchi
Goalkeeping coach	(Aruba) N/A
Fitness coach	(Aruba) N/A
Sports therapist	(Aruba) Hubert Leest
Equipment manager	(Aruba) N/A
