= SV Caiquetio =

Caiquetio
- Full name: Sport Club Caiquetio
- Nicknames: The Indians of Caiquetio
- Short name: Club Caiquetio
- Founded: December 2000
- Ground: Guillermo P. Trinidad Stadium; Oranjestad, Aruba
- Capacity: 5,500
- President: (Aruba) Julie Kelly
- Head Coach: (Aruba) Dolfito Jacobs
- League: Aruban Division di Honor
- 2022–23: Division Uno, 2nd, Group A Silver League (promotion 2023-24 Division di Honor)
- Website: https://caiquetio.arubafc.com/
Home colours	Away colours	Third colours

Sport Club Caiquetio (Dutch:Sport Vereniging), known as SC Caiquetio or simply Caiquetio, is an Aruban football club based in Paradera, which currently plays in Aruba's first division, after being relegated from the Division di Honor in 2013–14.

== Achievements ==
- Aruban Division Uno: 2

2004–05, 2011–12

== Players ==
=== Current squad ===
As of 28 October 2023

Note: Flags indicate national team as defined under FIFA eligibility rules; some limited exceptions apply. Players may hold more than one non-FIFA nationality.

No.	Pos.	Nation	Player
1	GK	VEN	Edenzo A. Pirona Sanchez
2	DF	ARU	Kevin K. Richardson
3	DF	ARU	Jeff Desir (Vice-captain)
4	DF	ARU	Imad Fath-Altaha
5	DF	ARU	David A. Croes
6	FW	ARU	Jesus Antonio Cruz Herrera
7	FW	ARU	Joseph D. Oduber
8	DF	ARU	Glembert Kock
9	FW	ARU	Christopher Mario Croes
10	FW	ARU	Gerald G. Vries (captain)
11	FW	ARU	Jodrick A. Junior Hernadez
12	DF	ARU	Marlon Lampe
13	MF	COL	Darwin R. Escobar

No.	Pos.	Nation	Player
14	MF	ARU	Jean Claude Farro
15	FW	ARU	Charles C.J. Jephthah
16	FW	ARU	Tyrone A. Wilfred Rafael
17	MF	ARU	Robert Solognier (Vice-captain)
18	DF	ARU	Kevin C. Edmar Dirksz
19	MF	ARU	Emigene de Cuba
20	DF	ARU	Kurt Franken
21	MF	COL	Jhon F. Alvarez Espinal (Vice-captain)
22	DF	ARU	Dwight R. Feliciano
23	DF	ARU	Christian Prada-S.
24	DF	ARU	Jonathan Angela
25	DF	ARU	Andro Aldrick Ridderstaat

=== Current technical staff ===
Position	Staff
Head coach	(Aruba) Dolfito Jacobs
Assistant coach	(Aruba) Darrell Trimon
Goalkeeping coach	(Aruba) N/A
Fitness coach	(Aruba) Darall Erasmus
Sports therapist	(Aruba) Marc Thode & Chris Croes
