= SV Dakota =

Dakota
- Full name: Sport Vereniging Dakota
- Nicknames: The Bees; Dakota tur dia! (English:Dakota all the way!)
- Short name: Dakota
- Founded: 15 July 1947; 79 years ago
- Ground: Guillermo P. Trinidad Stadium; Oranjestad, Aruba
- Capacity: 2,500
- President: Gilmar Croes
- Head Coach: Jonathan Lake
- League: Aruban Division di Honor
- 2025–26: Aruban Division di Honor, 2nd
Home colours	Away colours	Third colours

Sport Vereniging Dakota (English:Sports Club), known as SV Dakota or simply Dakota is an Aruban professional football club based in Oranjestad, Dakota, which currently plays in Aruban Division di Honor.

== Achievements ==
- Aruban Division di Honor: 17

1961, 1962, 1963, 1965, 1966, 1969, 1970, 1971, 1974, 1976, 1980, 1981, 1982, 1983, 1995, 2017–18, 2021–22

- Runners-Up: 13

1958, 1979, 1984, 1985, 1988, 1991, 1998, 2000, 2015-16, 2022-23, 2023-24, 2024-25, 2025-26

- Aruban Division Uno: 1

2010-11

- Torneo Copa Betico Croes: 4

2007, 2019, 2025, 2026

- Finalist: 4

2011, 2016, 2017, 2019

- Copa Juliana: 6

1960, 1962, 1963, 1967, 1968, 1969

- Netherlands Antilles Championship: 0
- Finalist: 4

1962, 1963, 1970, 1983

== Performance in CONCACAF competitions ==
- CONCACAF Champions' Cup: 1 appearance

1983 – 2nd Round (Caribbean) – Lost against (Suriname) SV Robinhood 5 – 1 on aggregate (stage 2 of 4)

- CONCACAF Caribbean Shield: 2 appearance

2019 – Third Group D
2023 – Second Group D

== Current squad ==
As of 10 September 2024

Note: Flags indicate national team as defined under FIFA eligibility rules; some limited exceptions apply. Players may hold more than one non-FIFA nationality.

No.	Pos.	Nation	Player
1	GK	SMA	Gikay Croes
2	DF	ARU	Ferdinand Robert (captain)
3	DF	ARU	Nickenson Paul
4	DF	ARU	George Tromp
5	MF	ARU	Liomar Croes
6	MF	ARU	Kenrick Paulina
8	DF	BRA	Emerson Leocádio
9	FW	NED	Owen v/d Wijne
10	MF	VEN	Daniel Briceño (Vice-captain)
11	FW	ARU	Ricky Hodge
12	DF	ARU	Derwin Donata
13	MF	COL	Camilo Peña
15	FM	ARU	Clyvenson Grandin

No.	Pos.	Nation	Player
16	MF	ARU	Theo Teixeira
17	MF	ARU	Joshua Gross (Vice-captain)
18	DF	ARU	Darvin Henson
19	FW	ARU	Daryl Nelson
20	FW	ARU	Shemar Monticeuex
21	MF	ARU	Randell Gross
22	GK	ARU	Gilbert Bautista
23	MF	VEN	Jesús Villamizar
24	DF	ARU	Junior Jean-Baptiste
25	GK	ARU	Philippe Caillaux
26	FW	POR	Anuar Andrade
27	FW	NED	Niels Stock

=== Current technical staff ===
Position	Staff
Head coach	(Aruba) Jonathan Lake
Assistant coach	(Aruba) Rodney Lake
Goalkeeping coach	(Aruba) N/A
Fitness coach	(Aruba) N/A
Sports therapist	(Netherlands) N/A
