= SV Deportivo Nacional =

Deportivo Nacional
- Full name: Sport Vereniging Deportivo Nacional
- Nickname: The Palm Beach Boys
- Short name: Nacional
- Founded: 15 March 1970; 56 years ago
- Ground: Guillermo P. Trinidad Stadium; Oranjestad, Aruba
- Capacity: 2,500
- President: (Aruba) Silo Brete
- Head Coach: (Venezuela) Dreyer Bracho
- League: Aruban Division di Honor
- 2024–2025: Division di Honor, 5th out of 10; Caya 6, 5th out of 10
Home colours	Away colours	Third colours

Sport Vereniging Deportivo Nacional (English:Sports Club), known as Deportivo Nacional or simply Nacional is an Aruban professional football club based in Palm Beach, Noord, which currently play in Aruba's first division. The hardcore supporters group call themselves "Bad Boys" or “Bechi Boys”.

== Achievements ==
- Aruban Division di Honor: 6

2000, 2001, 2003-04, 2006-07, 2016-17, 2020–21.

- Copa Betico Croes: 1

2024

  - Finalist: 4

2006, 2008, 2023, 2025

- Copa ABC: 1

2019

== Participation in CONCACAF competitions ==
- CFU Club Championship: 1 appearance

2007 – First Round (2nd in Group A – 1 pt), (stage 1 of 4)

- Caribbean Club Shield: 2 appearance

2018 - Fourth place
2022 - First round

== Current squad ==
As of 10 September 2024

Note: Flags indicate national team as defined under FIFA eligibility rules; some limited exceptions apply. Players may hold more than one non-FIFA nationality.

No.	Pos.	Nation	Player
1	GK	ARU	Urvin Kock
2	DF	BOE	Gendrick Meye (Vice-captain)
3	DF	IND	Shivay Wadhwani
4	DF	VEN	Leonardo Colmenares (Vice-captain)
5	DF	COL	Aldair Fontalvo
6	DF	ECU	Alex Ramón
7	FW	ARU	Hugo Robert
8	FW	ARU	Enzon Parra
9	FW	HAI	Fladimy François
10	FW	COL	Devis Oliveros (captain)
11	MF	COL	Charles de la Cruz
12	FW	ARU	Samuel Jimenez
13	DF	COL	William Pardo
14	FW	ARU	Luis Franken

No.	Pos.	Nation	Player
15	FW	ARU	Brian Susebeek
16	FW	ARU	Glenbert Croes
17	DF	ARU	George Tromp
18	MF	COL	Juan Caicedo
19	DF	ARU	Jair Jimenez
20	MF	COL	Ronaldo Valderrama
21	MF	COL	Joshua Aguirre (Vice-captain)
22	GK	COL	Yonathan Fontalvo
23	DF	ITA	Francesco Ceccarelli
24	DF	ARU	Rensley Tromp
25	DF	BOE	Deffery Banton
26	DF	PER	Bruno Alcocer
27	FW	JAM	Kenroy Ranger
28	FW	ARU	Junel Samuel

=== Current technical staff ===
Position	Staff
Head coach	(Venezuela) Dreyer Bracho
Assistant coach	(Venezuela) Jhon Villa
Goalkeeping coach	(Aruba) N/A
Fitness coach	(Aruba) N/A
Sports therapist	(Aruba) N/A
