= SV River Plate Aruba =

River Plate Aruba
- Full name: River Plate Aruba
- Nicknames: Riverplatense; Madiki Boyz; The Dream Team
- Founded: 1 February 1953; 73 years ago
- Ground: Guillermo P. Trinidad Stadium; Oranjestad, Aruba
- Capacity: 2,500
- President: (Aruba) Earnie Panneflek
- Head Coach: (Aruba) Shermin Schotborg
- League: Aruban Division di Honor
- 2023–24: 6th
Home colours	Away colours	Third colours

River Plate Aruba, known also as River Plate, or simply River, (previously named ASV River Plate) is an Aruban football club based in Madiki, Oranjestad. It was founded on 1 February 1953. The team plays in Aruba's first division Division di Honor.

== Achievements ==
- National Championships: 2

1993, 1997

- Aruban Division Uno: 2

1960, 2007

- Copa ABC : 1

1993

- Liga Honor Plata

2024–25

== Participation in CONCACAF competitions ==
- CONCACAF Champions League: 2 appearances

1994 – Second Qualifying Round
1995 – Preliminary Round

== Players ==
=== Current squad ===
As of 11 September 2023

Note: Flags indicate national team as defined under FIFA eligibility rules; some limited exceptions apply. Players may hold more than one non-FIFA nationality.

No.	Pos.	Nation	Player
1	GK	ARU	Whilmerd Croes
2	DF	ARU	Aldrick Conor (Vice-captain)
3	DF	ARU	Marc Aimsy Louis
4	DF	ARU	Carlos B. Quandt (captain)
5	DF	ARU	Alberto Grovell (Vice-captain)
6	FW	ARU	Shaun Every
7	FW	ARU	Carlos L. Quandt
8	MF	SUR	Julnes Plet
9	FW	ARU	Jonn-Rick Kelly
10	FW	ARU	Cee-Cyon Tromp
11	FW	ARU	Jason Carolina
12	FW	ARU	Rivaldo Pierre
13	MF	ARU	Shandrey Vrolijk
14	DF	ARU	Beatle Nadall
15	MF	COL	Mario Monsalve

No.	Pos.	Nation	Player
16	FW	ARU	Darnell Severino
17	MF	ARU	Ajeem Morales
18	DF	ARU	Albert Grovell
19	MF	ARU	Jonathan Alicea
20	DF	COL	Alex "Pollo" Ramirez
21	MF	ARU	Siljean Vrolijk (Vice-captain)
22	DF	ARU	Mario da Silva
23	MF	ARU	Shakame Stamper
24	DF	ARU	Jonathan Harrigan
25	MF	ARU	Vaughn Bergen
26	MF	ARU	Steven Martes
27	DF	ARU	Keanu Leonora
28	DF	ARU	Luis Enrique Lasten
29	MF	ARU	Sixtion Kock
30	GK	ARU	Josthan Maduro
