= SV La Fama =

La Fama
- Full name: Sport Vereniging La Fama
- Nickname: Esperansa Berde di Savaneta
- Short name: La Fama (English:The Fame)
- Founded: 18 February 1938; 88 years ago
- Ground: Savaneta, Aruba
- Capacity: 1,100
- President: (Aruba) Anthony Thijsen
- Head Coach: (Colombia) Daniel Chica
- League: Aruban Division di Honor
- 2025–26: 4th
- Website: www.svlafama.com
Home colours	Away colours	Third colours

Sport Vereniging La Fama (English:Sports Club) (known as SV La Fama) or simply La Fama is an Aruban football club based in Savaneta, who plays in Aruba's first division. The club name of 'La Fama' is Spanish for 'The Fame'.

== Achievements ==
- Aruban Division di Honor: 1

2012-13

- Aruban Division Uno: 2

1973, 2002

- Torneo Copa Betico Croes: 0
  - Finalist: 4

2009, 2020, 2021, 2026

- Liga Honor Plata: 2

2022-23, 2023-24

== Current squad ==
As of 26 September 2026

Note: Flags indicate national team as defined under FIFA eligibility rules; some limited exceptions apply. Players may hold more than one non-FIFA nationality.

No.	Pos.	Nation	Player
1	GK	ARU	Rony Geerman (Vice-captain)
2	DF	ARU	Zevon Vrolijk
3	DF	COL	Samuel Barco
4	DF	ARU	Gregory Maduro
5	MF	VEN	Dixo Ordoñez
6	MF	COL	Luis Mosquero
7	MF	ARU	Daniel Linscheer
8	MF	COL	Bayron García
9	FW	CAN	Timothé Makanzu-Tinadio
10	MF	COL	Joshua Acevedo (Vice-captain)
11	FW	ARU	Jermaine Carty
12	FW	ARU	Cristian Gonzales
13	DF	ARU	Tyrone Boasman
14	FW	ARU	Roland Tromp
15	MF	ARU	Tyson Boasman
16	MF	ARU	Adriano Nunes de Souza

No.	Pos.	Nation	Player
17	MF	ARU	Davion Rodgers
18	FW	COL	Anderson Olaya
19	MF	COL	Giovanny Jiménez
20	DF	ARU	Alexon Simmons
21	DF	ARU	Marc Laurence
22	DF	NED	Marsinho Koorndijk (captain)
23	MF	ARU	Kendreck Kock
24	FW	ARU	Davidson Kaarsbaan
25	FW	JAM	Kenroy Ranger (Vice-captain)
26	MF	ARU	Aydionne Croes
27	FW	ARU	Cyler Arends
28	MF	ARU	Stephan Becker
29	DF	ARU	Anderson Ceballos
30	GK	ARU	Gilbert Bautista
31	GK	ARU	Joshua Ammerlaan
32	MF	ARU	Jack Maxwell

=== Current technical staff ===
Position	Staff
Head coach	(Colombia) Daniel Chica
Assistant coach	(Aruba) Jomar Boekhoudt
Assistant coach	(Netherlands) Kevin Eefting
Assistant coach	(Netherlands) Rudolph Loor
Performance coach	(Aruba) Marco Mejia
Goalkeeping coach	(Aruba) N/A
Sports therapist	(Venezuela) Carolina Sanchez

== Staff and board members ==
- President: (Aruba) Anthony Thijsen
- Team Manager - (Aruba) Giovanni S.G. Croes
- Ass.Team Manager - (Aruba) Brandon Dirksz

=== Former players ===
- (Aruba) Sylvester Schwengle
- (Aruba) Joel Rodriguez
- (Canada) Anthony Walsh
- (Canada) Grégory David
- (Canada) Abdelatif Taleb
- (Netherlands) Jaysen van Beukering
- (Haiti) Caleb Jean Baptiste

=== Coaching history ===
Caretaker manager are listed in italics.

- (Aruba) Reinhard Breinburg (2017–19)
- (Aruba) Joel Rodriguez (2020–23)
- (Aruba) Jomar Boekhoudt (2024–25)
- (Canada) Kevin Butler (2026)
- (Indonesia) Jhonny van Beukering (2026)
