= Savaneta =

- Town and Region
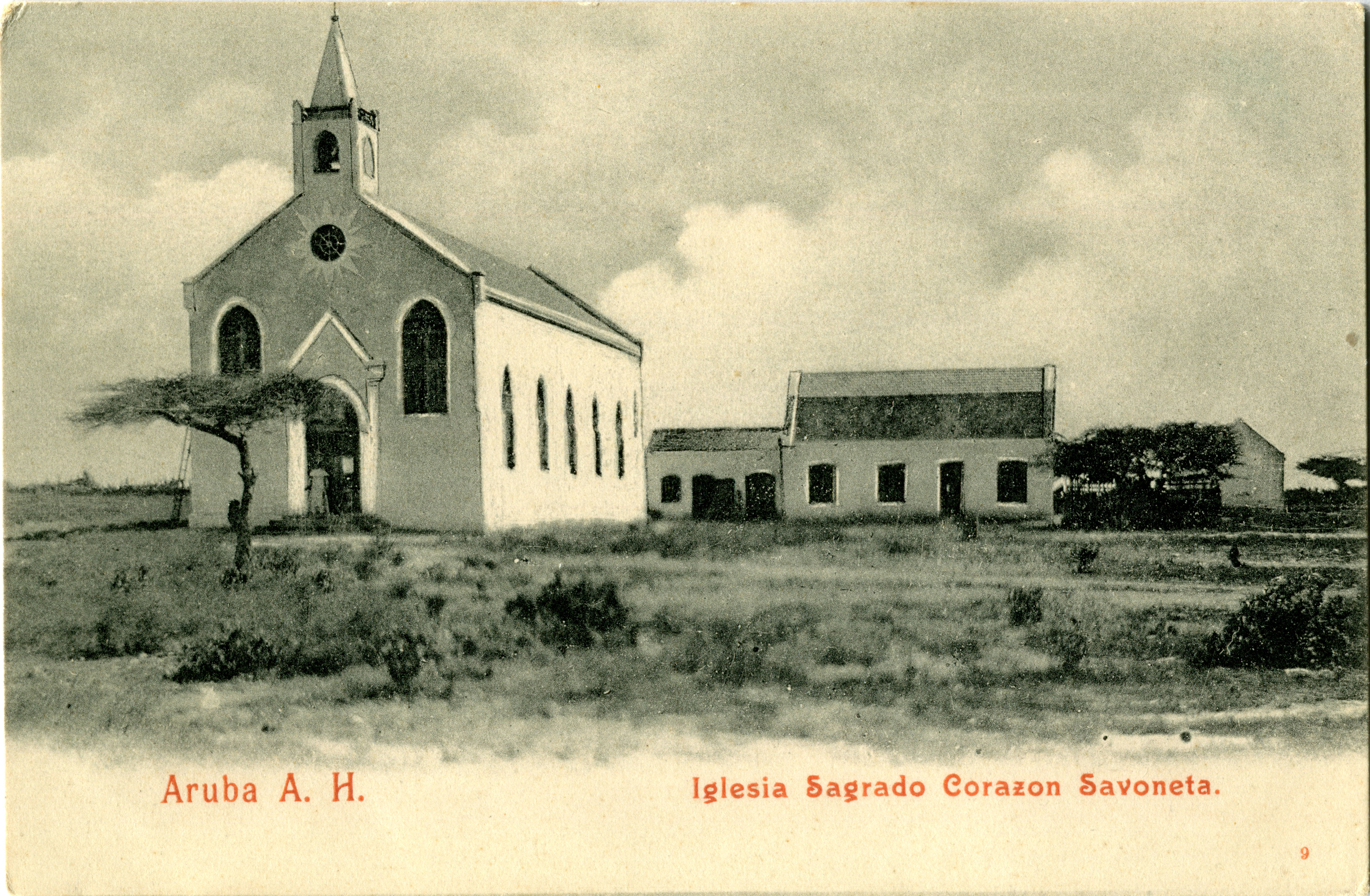
- Iglesia Sagrado Corazon (c.1903)
- Interactive map of Savaneta
- Coordinates: 12°27′9.5″N 69°56′58.75″W
- Country: Aruba
- Region: Savaneta

Area
  - Land: 28.0 km^{2} (10.8 sq mi)

Population (2020)
  - Total: 11,955
  - Density: 427/km^{2} (1,110/sq mi)
- Time zone: UTC-4 (AST)

Savaneta is a town and region in southeastern Aruba. Until 1797, it was the island's capital city. It is home to the island's oldest surviving home, a 150-year-old cas di torto, or mud hut. The Savaneta region has an estimated area of 27.76 square kilometers and 11,518 inhabitants according to the 2010 census.

== History ==
Savaneta is the oldest village of Aruba. In the 16th century, it became the capital of the Spanish administration. After Aruba was conquered by the Netherlands, the governor lived in Commander's Bay, a natural harbour near Savaneta. In 1797, the government moved to Paardenbaai which would later become Oranjestad. By 1816, only one house had remained inhabited. In 1852, the Canashito plantation was established, and workers were exempt for taxation for eight years. Still, only 13 men and five boys moved to Savaneta that year. Other plantations were more successful, and by 1867 Savaneta was recognised as a village. It was home to about 150 people. In 1877, a school was founded and in 1900 a church was built. Commander's Bay is nowadays used as the Marine Barracks Savaneta, a base for the Royal Netherlands Navy, the Netherlands Marine Corps, the Netherlands Coastguard, and the Aruban Military. It is also near the Sunrise Solar Park.

== Notable people ==
- Guillfred Besaril (1974), Minister Plenipotentiary
- Ibian Hodgson (1993), tennis player.
- Roger Peterson (1980), musician.

== Sources ==
- Alofs, Luc (1997). "Savaneta, een vlek of dorp die men nergens anders aantreft". Savaneta, een vlek of dorp [Savaneta, a hamlet or village].
