= Paradera =

- Region
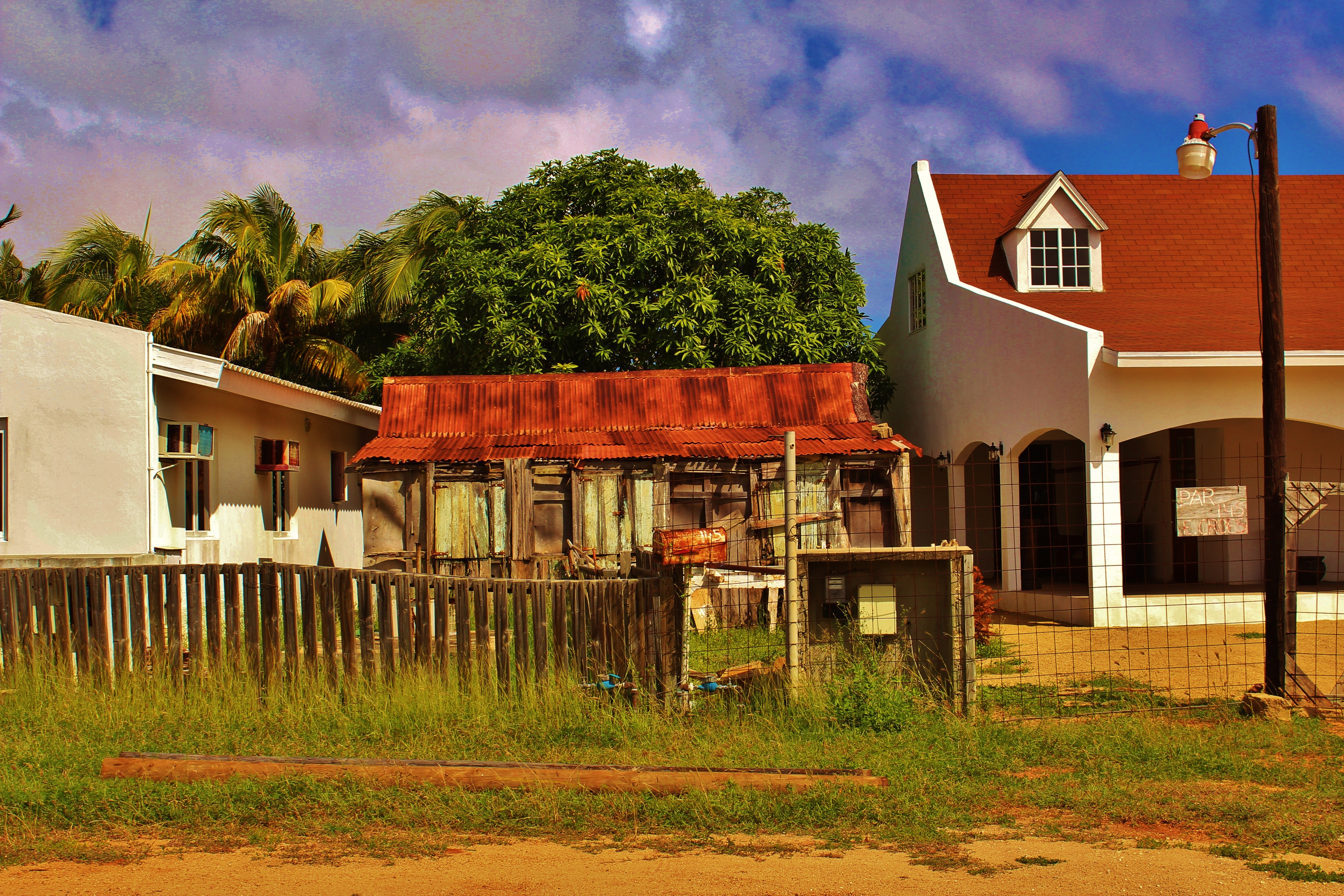
- A small wooden house in Paradera, Aruba

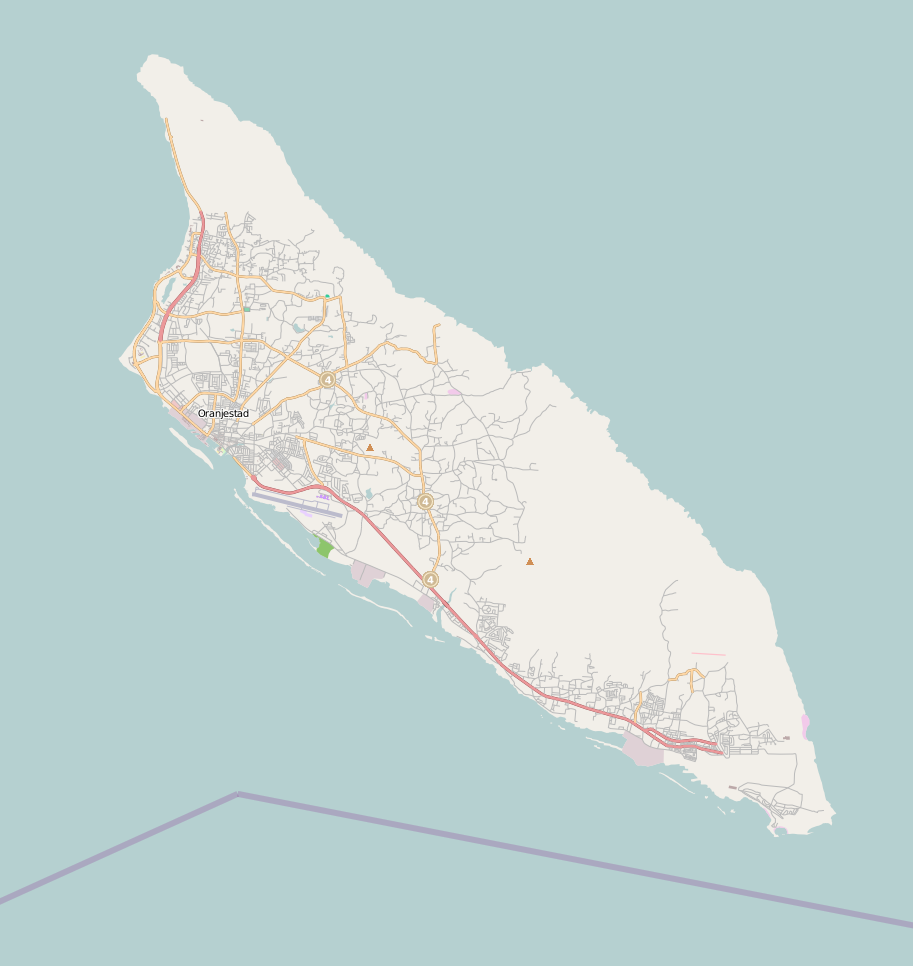
- Location of Paradera in Aruba
- Sovereign state: Kingdom of the Netherlands
- Country: Aruba

Area
  - Total: 25.0 km^{2} (9.7 sq mi)

Population (2020)
  - Total: 13,834
  - Density: 553.4/km^{2} (1,433/sq mi)

Paradera is a town and a census region in the central-northeastern part of Aruba. The census region Paradera encompasses the town of Paradera and the settlements and neighborhoods of Ayo, Bloemond, Piedra Plat, and Shiribana. At the time of the 2010 census, Paradera town proper had a population of 2,486, and the Paradera census region had a population of 12,024 inhabitants. The area is known for its natural landmarks including Hooiberg, a conical hill rising approximately 540 ft (160 m), and the Casibari–Ayo diorite boulder formations, which feature ancient Arawak rock art. Though not located on the coast, it is located close to the capital Oranjestad, and has short access to beaches along the coast.

== Geography ==
The census region of Paradera is located the central-northeastern part of Aruba. The census region Paradera encompasses the settlements of Ayo, Bloemond, Piedra Plat, and Shiribana. Hooiberg, a conical hill rises approximately 540 ft (160 m) above the terrain.

== Demographics ==
At the time of the 2010 census, the Paradera census region consisted of four settlements. Paradera town proper had a population of 2,486, and the Paradera census region had a population of 12,024.

| Name | Male | Female | Total |
|---|---|---|---|
| Shiribana | 1,755 | 1,945 | 3,700 |
| Paradera | 1,207 | 1,279 | 2,486 |
| Ayo | 1,582 | 1,836 | 3,418 |
| Piedra Plat | 1,203 | 1,217 | 2,419 |
| Total | 5,747 | 6,277 | 12,024 |

Until the previous census, the neighborhood of Bloemond was listed as a part of Paradera.

== Economy ==
The region has several cultural and natural attractions like rock formations and pools. Though not a coastal region, it is located close to the national capital Oranjestad, and to the coast, offering easy access to beaches. The St. Philomena's Church, a Roman Catholic church, dominates the skyline relative to the rest of the town's buildings. Bushiribana Gold Mill ruins features remnants of a gold mine from the 19th century. The Casibari–Ayo diorite boulder formations, feature ancient Arawak rock art, and the Museum of Antiquities Aruba exhibits artifacts from pre-ceramic times to the modern era and is located at Rococo Plaza in Paradera.
