= SV Bubali =

Bubali
- Full name: Bubali Sport Club
- Nicknames: Orguyonan di Noord; Esperansa Berde
- Short name: Bubali SC
- Founded: 23 September 1943; 82 years ago
- Ground: Guillermo P. Trinidad Stadium; Oranjestad, Aruba
- Capacity: 5,500
- President: (Aruba) Anthonio Tonny Geerman
- Manager: (Aruba) Gregory Tromp
- League: Aruban Division di Honor
- 2024–25: Division Uno 1st. Group A Silver League 2nd (promotion 2025-26 Division di Honor)
- Website: http://bubalisportclub.wetpaint.com/
Home colours	Away colours	Third colours

Bubali Sport Club, known also as Bubali SC, or simply Bubali, is an Aruban football club based in Noord, They are currently playing in Aruba's top division.

== Achievements ==
- Aruban Division di Honor: 1

1975

- Copa Betico Croes: 0
  - Finalist: 2

2010, 2014

== Players ==
=== Current squad ===
As of 10 September 2023

Note: Flags indicate national team as defined under FIFA eligibility rules; some limited exceptions apply. Players may hold more than one non-FIFA nationality.

No.	Pos.	Nation	Player
1	GK	ARU	Josthan Maduro (Vice-captain)
2	DF	COL	Jonathan Torres
3	DF	ARU	Ethan Gumbs
3	DF	COL	Bruno Alcocer
4	DF	ITA	Francesco Ceccarelli
5	DF	ARU	Jean-Pierre Zimmer
6	MF	COL	Jaker-Xielle Montilla
7	FW	ARU	Willem Werleman
8	FW	COL	Alberto Monsalve (Vice-captain)
9	FW	ARU	Cedrick Pas
10	FW	ARU	Michael-Shawn Figaroa (captain)
11	FW	ARU	Marc Milrose
12	DF	ARU	Sjon David Pieters
13	MF	ARU	Cedrik Kerpens
14	MF	VEN	Marcos Santos
15	FW	COL	Nick Zara

No.	Pos.	Nation	Player
16	FW	COL	Jian Franco Burgos
17	MF	ARU	Ezekiel Silberie
18	FW	ARU	Jean Luc Oduber
19	MF	COL	John Zara
20	DF	ARU	Michael Tromp
21	MF	ARU	Sidney Kelly (Vice-captain)
22	GK	ARU	Mario Monsalve
23	MF	ARU	Done Cornet
24	DF	COL	Jose David Monsalve
25	MF	ARU	Youmont Martinez
26	MF	ARU	Jonathan Leest
27	MF	ARU	Ricky Giel
28	MF	COL	Elajih Ponte Lira
29	MF	COL	Emanuel García
29	MF	COL	Daniël Lopez

=== Current technical staff ===
Position	Staff
Head coach	(Aruba) Gregory Tromp
Assistant coach	(Peru) Genaro “Profe” Vargas
Goalkeeping coach	(Aruba) Ryan Figaroa
Fitness coach	(Aruba) Michelle Every
Sports therapist	(Netherlands) Jerome van der Spil (Netherlands) Ruud Suntjens
Equipment manager	(Portugal) De Andrade
