= SV Estrella =

- Full name: Sport Vereniging Estrella; Sport Vereniging Estrella Futbol Ecogas (Sponsor name)
- Founded: 1 September 1948
- Ground: Guiilermo P. Trinidad Stadium; Oranjestad, Aruba
- Capacity: 2,500
- League: Aruban Division di Honor
- 2024-25: 6th
Home colours

Sport Vereniging Estrella is an Aruban football club, which currently plays in Aruba's first division. They are based in Papilon, Santa Cruz. The team is one of the most successful in Aruban football, and they are one of the two Aruban teams that won the Netherlands Antilles Championship.

== Achievements ==
- Aruban Division di Honor: 12

1968, 1973, 1977, 1985, 1988, 1989, 1990, 1992, 1996, 1998, 1999, 2006

- Netherlands Antilles Championship: 1

1970

== Performance in CONCACAF competitions ==
- CONCACAF Champions' Cup: 1 appearance

1971 – Final Round (CONCACAF Series) – (6th placed in Final Group – 0 pts), (stage 2 of 2)

== Staff and board members ==
- President: (Aruba) Greg Croes
- Other Board Members: Roxanne Josephina Angela, Joanne Oduber, Roberto Geerman, Patricio Maduro
