= 2018–19 Bonaire League =

Bonaire League
- Season: 2018–19
- Champions: Real Rincon
- Caribbean Club Shield: Real Rincon
- Matches played: 56
- Goals scored: 201 (3.59 per match)

The 2018–19 Bonaire League, known locally as the 2018–19 Kampionato, was the 49th season of the Bonaire League, the top division football competition in Bonaire.

The season began with the first round of league matches on 2 November 2018 and ended with the final round of matches on 17 May 2019. Two-time defending champions Real Rincon won their 11th title and were automatically qualified for the 2020 Caribbean Club Shield.

== Background ==
Football was first played in Bonaire in the 1920s. The Bonairiaanse Voetbal Bond was formed in 1960 and the first league competition took place in the 1960–61 season. For most season from 1960, the best teams on the island would compete in the Bonaire League but some championships were not played and three championships in the early 2000s were considered unofficial so the 2018–19 edition was the 49th running of the league.

Coming into the season, Real Rincon were two-time defending champions having won the league in 2016–17 and 2017–18, beating Juventus both times in the play-off final. Juventus – who had most recently won the league in 2013 – were the most successful team in the competition's history having won the league a record 14 times. Real Rincon were the second most-successful team after winning their 10th league title in 2017–18.

== Format ==
The eight teams played each other on a double round robin basis in which each team played every other team once at home and once away from home. The league winners would qualify for the 2020 Caribbean Club Shield.

== League table ==
Pos	Team	Pld	W	D	L	GF	GA	GD	Pts	Qualification or relegation
1	Real Rincon	14	12	1	1	52	10	+42	37	Caribbean Club Shield
2	Estrellas	14	10	3	1	42	13	+29	33	
3	Atlétiko Flamingo	13	7	2	4	29	15	+14	23	
4	Vespo	14	6	2	6	21	19	+2	20	
5	Atlétiko Tera Corá	14	4	2	8	16	22	−6	14	
6	Uruguay	14	4	1	9	19	57	−38	13	
7	Vitesse	14	3	3	8	15	34	−19	12	
8	Juventus	13	1	2	10	7	31	−24	5	

The final league match between Atlétiko Flamingo and Juventus at the Stadion Antonio Trenidat, Rincon was not played.
