= 2019–20 Bonaire League =

Bonaire League
- Season: 2019–20
- Matches: 55
- Goals: 242 (4.4 per match)
- Top goalscorer: Jermaine Windster (16 goals)
- Biggest home win: Estrellas 13-0 Arriba Perú; 17 January 2020
- Biggest away win: Atlétiko Tera Corá 1-12 Uruguay; 7 November 2019
- Highest scoring: Atlétiko Tera Corá 1-12 Uruguay; 7 November 2019; Estrellas 13-0 Arriba Perú; 17 January 2020

The 2019–20 Bonaire League, or known locally as the 2019–20 Kampionato, is the 50th season of the Bonaire League, the top division football competition in Bonaire. The season began on 25 October 2019 and was postponed after the 11th round of matches due to the COVID-19 pandemic. The winner of the league will automatically qualify for the 2021 Caribbean Club Shield.

The league grew from eight teams to ten from the previous season with the addition of Young Boys and Arriba Perú.

== League table ==
Pos	Team	Pld	W	D	L	GF	GA	GD	Pts	Qualification or relegation
1	Real Rincon	11	10	1	0	51	14	+37	31	Caribbean Club Shield
2	Atlétiko Flamingo	11	9	0	2	41	11	+30	27	
3	Uruguay	11	8	2	1	38	10	+28	26	
4	Vespo	11	7	3	1	31	15	+16	24	
5	Estrellas	11	5	1	5	27	23	+4	16	
6	Vitesse	11	3	3	5	14	20	−6	12	
7	Juventus	11	1	4	6	11	29	−18	7	
8	Atlétiko Tera Corá	11	1	4	6	8	35	−27	7	
9	Young Boys	11	1	1	9	8	32	−24	4	
10	Arriba Perú	11	0	1	10	13	53	−40	1	

Source: RSSSF

== Top scorers ==
Rank	Goalscorer	Team	Goals
1	(Bonaire) Jermaine Windster	SV Uruguay	16
2	(Bonaire) Edshel Martha	SV Real Rincon	11
3	(Bonaire) Yurick Seinpaal	SV Atlétiko Flamingo	10
4	(Bonaire) Lacey Pauletta	SV Atlétiko Flamingo	9
5	(Bonaire) Leroy Van Dongen	SV Uruguay	8
5	(Bonaire) Giandro Steba	SV Atlétiko Flamingo	8
5	(Bonaire) Jursten Trinidad	SV Vespo	8
8	(Bonaire) Jerson Agostien	SV Real Rincon	7
9	(Bonaire) Emiliano	SV Estrellas	9
9	(Bonaire) Mayron Serberie	SV Estrellas	9
