= 2006–07 Bonaire League season =

Bonaire League
- Season: 2006-07
- Champions: Vespo
- Matches played: 63
- Goals scored: 219 (3.48 per match)

The 2006/07 season of the Bonearian football League started on October 27, 2006 and the final was played on August 3, 2007.

The championship was played over 3 phases. First phase with all 7 teams, followed by a playoff with the top 4 teams and then a final with the 2 top teams. Matches started at the stadium of Kralendijk but, due to renovations of the pitch, were continued at Antonio Trenidat Stadium in Rincon. With home court advantage both teams of Rincon qualified for the final for the second time in history. Vespo defeated Real Rincon 1-0 to become champion only for the second time in their history.

The season ended officially on September 14, 2007, with a Supercup (held for the first time) between the champions Vespo and the best placed team of the regular season Real Rincon. Real Rincon took revenge of their loss in the final by defeating their rivals 4-2.

== Regular season ==
Teams face each other 3 times. Top four teams qualify for the semifinal playoffs

	ATC	EST	JUV	RR	URU	VES	VIT
ATC		1-3	0-7	0-3	0-2	1-4	1-3
Estrellas	6-0		0-0	0-2	3-0	0-0	5-0
Juventus	4-0	1-2		1-2	0-1	1-2	2-0
Real Rincon	4-0	0-2	2-1		2-1	2-0	4-3
Uruguay	2-1	0-2	2-2	0-1		3-1	4-1
Vespo	2-0	2-2	0-2	1-1	1-1		8-1
Vitesse	3-2	0-0	0-4	1-3	2-1	0-1	

	ATC					
Estrellas	2-0	EST				
Juventus	2-2	6-1	JUV			
Real Rincon	5-2	0-0	2-2	RR		
Uruguay	5-1	0-3	2-2	1-5	URU	
Vespo	3-0	1-1	2-2	3-2	4-1	VES
Vitesse	4-1	1-4	0-1	2-2	1-1	2-3

== Standing ==
pos	Team	GP	W	D	L	PNT	GF	GA	GD
1	Real Rincon	18	11	4	3	37	42	20	22
2	Estrellas	18	10	6	2	36	36	14	22
3	Vespo	18	9	6	3	33	38	22	16
4	Juventus	18	8	6	4	30	40	22	18
5	Uruguay	18	6	4	8	22	27	32	-3
6	Vitesse	18	4	3	11	15	24	47	-23
7	ATC	18	0	1	17	1	12	64	-52

== Playoffs ==
Teams face each other 2 times. Top two teams qualify for the final.

	EST	JUV	RR	VES
Estrellas		2-1	1-2	1-1
Juventus	2-2		0-1	0-1
Real Rincon	1-2	3-1		0-2
Vespo	2-1	1-1	1-0	

== Standing ==
pos	Team	GP	W	D	L	PNT	GF	GA	GD
1	Vespo	6	4	2	0	14	8	3	5
2	Real Rincon	6	3	0	3	9	7	7	1
3	Estrellas	6	2	2	2	8	9	9	-1
4	Juventus	6	0	2	4	2	5	10	-5

== Final ==
August 3	Vespo	1-0	Real Rincon
	Oleana 15'

== Supercup ==
Real Rincon	4-2	Vespo
Pauletta; Piar; Pauletta; Pauletta		Janga; Trenidat

== Abbreviations ==
gp	matches played
w	matches won
l	matches drawn
d	matches lost
pnt	total points
gf	goals scored
ga	goals conceded
ds	goal difference
