= List of football clubs in Bonaire =

This is a list of Association football clubs in Bonaire.

- Arriba Perú (Playa, Kralendijk)
- Atlétiko Flamingo (Nikiboko, Kralendijk)
- Atlétiko Tera Corá (Tera Kòra, Kralendijk)
- Real Rincon (Rincon)
- SV Estrellas (Nort'i Saliña, Kralendijk)
- SV Juventus (Antriòl, Kralendijk)
- SV Vespo (Rincon)
- SV Vitesse (Antriòl, Kralendijk)
- SV Uruguay (Antriòl, Kralendijk)
- SV Young Boys (Nort'i Saliña, Kralendijk)
- Independiente Bonaire (Nikibobo, Kralendijk)
