= 2002–03 Bonaire League season =

Bonaire League
- Season: 2002-03
- Champions: Real Rincon
- Matches played: 21
- Goals scored: 66 (3.14 per match)

The 2002/03 Bonaire League (the top association football league in Bonaire, special municipality of Netherlands) season was delayed and later on cancelled due to some internal problems.

The FFB later on decided to organise a warm up championship for the 2003/2004 season. The championship was held with a 7 team round robin followed by a final between the top 2 team. All matches were played in the Antonio Trinidat stadium in Rincon. Real Rincon won the final by defeating Juventus 3-0.

== Regular season ==
Teams face each other 1 time. Top two teams qualify for the final.

	ATC					
Estrellas	2-0	EST				
Juventus	3-0	2-0	JUV			
Real Rincon	2-1	2-1	2-0	RR		
Uruguay	3-2	1-1	1-2	2-1	URU	
Vespo	1-2	3-2	1-2	0-1	1-4	VES
Vitesse	2-2	0-2	2-4	1-2	2-2	0-2

== Standing ==
pos	Team	GP	W	D	L	GF	GA	GD	PNT
1	Juventus	6	5	0	1	13	6	7	15
2	Real Rincon	6	5	0	1	10	5	5	15
3	Uruguay	6	3	2	1	13	9	4	11
4	Estrellas	6	2	1	3	8	8	0	7
5	Vespo	6	2	0	4	8	11	-3	6
6	ATC	6	1	1	4	7	13	-6	4
7	Vitesse	6	0	2	4	7	14	-7	2

== Final ==
July 5	Real Rincon	3-0	Juventus
	Martijn; Jansen; Gijsbertha
