= 2017–18 Bonaire League =

Bonaire League
- Season: 2017–18
- Champions: SV Real Rincon
- Caribbean Club Shield: SV Real Rincon
- Top goalscorer: (Bonaire) Ayrton Cicilia (21 goals)

The 2017–18 Bonaire League or known locally as the 2017–18 Kampionato is the 48th season of the Bonaire League, the top-tier football league in Bonaire. The regular season began on 19 November 2017, and the final was played on 26 August 2018.

== Regular season ==
Pos	Team	Pld	W	D	L	GF	GA	GD	Pts	Qualification or relegation
1	Real Rincon	16	14	1	1	57	17	+40	43	Qualification to the Kaya 6
2	Atlétiko Flamingo	16	11	1	4	49	21	+28	34	Qualification to the Kaya 6
3	Vespo	16	11	1	4	46	19	+27	34	Qualification to the Kaya 6
4	Estrellas	16	9	3	4	38	23	+15	30	Qualification to the Kaya 6
5	Juventus	16	7	1	8	28	33	−5	22	Qualification to the Kaya 6
6	Atlétiko Tera Corá	16	5	4	7	27	26	+1	19	Qualification to the Kaya 6
7	Vitesse	16	5	2	9	22	39	−17	17	
8	Arriba Perú	16	2	1	13	11	48	−37	7	
9	Uruguay	16	1	0	15	16	68	−52	3	

Source: RSSSF
Rules for classification: 1) points; 2) goal difference; 3) number of goals scored.

== Kaya 6 ==
Pos	Team	Pld	W	D	L	GF	GA	GD	Pts	Qualification or relegation
1	Real Rincon	5	5	0	0	13	4	+9	15	Qualification to the Kaya 4
2	Estrellas	5	2	1	2	6	4	+2	7	Qualification to the Kaya 4
3	Vespo	5	1	3	1	7	5	+2	6	Qualification to the Kaya 4
4	Juventus	5	1	2	2	7	10	−3	5	Qualification to the Kaya 4
5	Atlétiko Flamingo	5	1	2	2	4	7	−3	5	
6	Atlétiko Tera Corá	5	1	0	4	4	11	−7	3	

Source: RSSSF
Rules for classification: 1) points; 2) goal difference; 3) number of goals scored.

== Kaya 4 ==
Pos	Team	Pld	W	D	L	GF	GA	GD	Pts	Qualification or relegation
1	Juventus	3	3	0	0	6	2	+4	9	Qualification to the Final
2	Real Rincon	3	2	0	1	3	3	0	6	Qualification to the Final
3	Vespo	3	1	0	2	6	7	−1	3	
4	Estrellas	3	0	0	3	2	5	−3	0	

Source: RSSSF
Rules for classification: 1) points; 2) goal difference; 3) number of goals scored.

== Final ==
26 August 2018
19:00 UTC−4

Juventus	1–1 (a.e.t.)	Real Rincon
	Report
Penalties
	4–5

Stadion Antonio Trenidat, Rincon

== Top scorers ==
Rank	Goalscorer	Team	Goals
1	(Bonaire) Ayrton Cicilia	SV Real Rincon	21
2	(Bonaire) Rai-Cesar Cicilia	SV Atlétiko Flamingo	15
3	(Bonaire) Jerson Agostien	SV Estrellas	14
4	(Bonaire) Yurick Seinpaal	SV Real Rincon	13
5	(Bonaire) Christopher Isenia	SV Vespo	12
6	(Bonaire) Jermaine Windster	SV Real Rincon	9
6	(Bonaire) Jurven Koffy	SV Atlétiko Flamingo	9
8	(Bonaire) Terrence Frans	SV Real Rincon	8
8	(Bonaire) Sergio Mercera	SV Atlétiko Flamingo	8
10	(Bonaire) Jayson Wijman	SV Vespo	7
