= 2016–17 Bonaire League =

Bonaire League
- Season: 2016–17
- Top goalscorer: (Bonaire) Ayrton Cicilia (15 goals)
- Biggest home win: Real Rincon 6–2 Arriba Peru (28 Jan. 2017)
- Biggest away win: ATC 0–4 Vespo (16 Dec. 2016) Arriba Perú 0–4 Juventus (20 Jan. 2017)
- Highest scoring: SV Real Rincon 6-2 Arriba Peru
- All statistics correct as of 6 May 2025.

The 2016–17 Bonaire League or known locally as the 2016–17 Kampionato is the 48th season of the Bonaire League. The first phase of the season began on 21 October 2016 and ended on 21 May 2017. The regular stage of the season culminated with the Kaya 6 tournament, which the top six teams partook in to determine the overall champion. The Kaya 6 will begin on 11 June 2017 and end on 14 July 2017.

Atlétiko Flamingo entered the season as the defending champions. The club finished sixth in the regular season, but may still win the league if they place top 4 in the kaya 6 and go on to win the final.

== Clubs ==
Nine clubs participated in the league for the 2016–17 season.

Team	Home city	Home ground
Arriba Perú	unknown	unknown
Atlétiko	Tera Kòrá	La Sonrisa Football Field
Atlétiko Flamingo	Rincon	Stadion Antonio Trenidat
Estrellas	Nort Saliña	Stadion Nort Saliña
Juventus	Kralendijk	Municipal Stadium
Real Rincon	Rincon	Stadion Antonio Trenidat
Vespo	Rincon	Stadion Antonio Trenidat
Vitesse	Kralendijk	Municipal Stadium
Uruguay	Rincon	Stadion Antonio Trenidat

== Table ==
=== Regular season ===
Pos	Team	Pld	W	D	L	GF	GA	GD	Pts	Qualification or relegation
1	Vespo	16	12	3	1	39	15	+24	39	Qualification to the Kaya 6
2	Juventus	16	7	5	4	24	13	+11	26	Qualification to the Kaya 6
3	Uruguay	16	6	7	3	30	27	+3	25	Qualification to the Kaya 6
4	Vitesse	16	7	3	6	28	27	+1	24	Qualification to the Kaya 6
5	Real Rincon	16	7	2	7	35	31	+4	23	Qualification to the Kaya 6
6	Atlétiko Flamingo	16	6	5	5	28	26	+2	23	Qualification to the Kaya 6
7	Atlétiko Tera Kòrá	16	4	4	8	21	31	−10	16	
8	Estrellas	16	3	4	9	13	27	−14	13	
9	Arriba Perú	16	1	5	10	15	36	−21	8	

Source: https://www.rsssf.org/tablesb/bonaire2017.html

=== Kaya 6 ===
Pos	Team	Pld	W	D	L	GF	GA	GD	Pts	Qualification or relegation
1	Juventus	5	2	2	1	10	9	+1	8	Qualification to the Kaya 4
2	Uruguay	5	2	2	1	9	8	+1	8	Qualification to the Kaya 4
3	Vespo	5	2	2	1	8	7	+1	8	Qualification to the Kaya 4
4	Real Rincon	5	2	1	2	10	7	+3	7	Qualification to the Kaya 4
5	Atlétiko Flamingo	5	1	2	2	8	10	−2	5	
6	Vitesse	5	1	1	3	5	9	−4	4	

Source: https://www.rsssf.org/tablesb/bonaire2017.html

=== Kaya 4 ===
Pos	Team	Pld	W	D	L	GF	GA	GD	Pts	Qualification or relegation
1	Real Rincon	3	3	0	0	10	6	+4	9	Qualification to the Final
2	Juventus	3	2	0	1	10	4	+6	6	Qualification to the Final
3	Vespo	3	1	0	2	6	8	−2	3	
4	Uruguay	3	0	0	3	4	12	−8	0	

Source: https://www.rsssf.org/tablesb/bonaire2017.html

=== Final ===
September 1

Real Rincon	2-0	Juventus
