= Yurick Seinpaal =

Bonairean footballer (born 1995)

Personal information
- Date of birth: 12 November 1995 (age 30)
- Place of birth: Bonaire
- Position: Forward

Team information
- Current team: Vespo

Senior career*
Years	Team	Apps	(Gls)
2013–2014	S.V. Uruguay	8	(3)
2014–2019	Real Rincon	29	(14)
2019–2022	SV Atlétiko Flamingo	29	(32)
2023-	Vespo	12	(15)

International career^{‡}
2013–	Bonaire	20	(6)
- * Club domestic league appearances and goals as of 31 May 2024 ‡ National team caps and goals as of 25 October 2023 (UTC)

Yurick Seinpaal (born 12 November 1995) is a Bonairean footballer who plays for Vespo of the Bonaire League, and the Bonaire national team. With six international goals, Seinpaal is Bonaire's all-time top goal scorer since joining CONCACAF in 2013.

== Club career ==
Seinpaal signed for S.V. Uruguay of the Bonaire League in 2013. At the midway point of his first season with the club, Seinpaal had scored three goals in Uruguay's first eight matches.

In December 2014, Seinpaal was signed by Real Rincon who were reigning champions of the Bonaire League for the 2014 season at the time. During his first season with the club, Real Rincon won the Kopa MCB.

In December 2015, Seinpaal traveled to Curaçao as Bonaire's selection to participate in the 2016 MLS Caribbean Combine, a joint venture between Major League Soccer and the Caribbean Football Union which aims to provide opportunities for players from all CFU member nations to be observed by MLS and United Soccer League scouts with the hopes of being invited to the MLS Combine. Following his tryout at the Caribbean Combine, Seinpaal was not selected to attend the MLS Combine.

Seinpaal won his first league championship with Real Rincon for the 2016/17 season. In the final he scored the eventual game-winning goal in the 78th minute against SV Juventus. He finished fourth on the scoring chart with thirteen goals during the 2017–18 Bonaire League season.

In April 2018 Real Rincon qualified for the 2018 Caribbean Club Shield. In the club's opening match, Seinpaal scored two goals as the Rincon defeated Hard Rock FC of Grenada 3–1 in Santiago de los Caballeros, Dominican Republic. He then featured in the club's next match, a 2–2 draw with Avenues United FC which ensured that Real became the first club from Bonaire to advance to the semi-finals of a CONCACAF tournament. Real Rincon went on to win bronze in the tournament.

Seinpaal competed with Real Rincon in the 2018 and 2019 Kopa ABC. The new tournament pitted the league champions and runners-up of Aruba, Bonaire, and Curaçao against each other. Seinpaal scored in the tournament final victory over CRKSV Jong Holland to win the title. In 2019 he scored against SV Deportivo Nacional before Rincon was ultimately defeated by S.V. Vesta in the semi-final.

In 2019 he made the switch to another Bonaire League club, SV Atlétiko Flamingo. He was the Bonaire League's top scorer with the club in 2021 with nine goals.

== International career ==
On 14 November 2013, Seinpaal made his international debut for Bonaire against Suriname in the 2013 ABCS Tournament. This match was also Bonaire's official debut after being accepted as a member of CONCACAF and the CFU in April 2013. In May 2014, Seinpaal was named to Bonaire's roster for 2014 Caribbean Cup qualification, the first CONCACAF tournament in which they took part after becoming a member. On 1 June 2014, Seinpaal scored his first goal for Bonaire during the qualification process, the first goal of a 2–1 victory over the U.S. Virgin Islands.

In December 2015, Seinpaal was named to the provisional squad by Bonaire head coach Ferdinand Bernabela in preparation for 2017 Caribbean Cup qualification. However, Bonaire ultimately did not enter the competition.

In September 2018 Seinpaal was named to Bonaire's squad for the inaugural qualifying campaign for the newly established CONCACAF Nations League. After qualifying for the 2019–20 CONCACAF Nations League C, Seinpaal started in the team's opening match against the British Virgin Islands. His 78th-minute goal of the 4–2 victory made him Bonaire's top scorer since joining CONCACAF while the team's four-goal performance was its highest goal tally in a single match to that point. Three days later he scored from a free kick for his second goal in Bonaire's first two matches as the team was defeated 1–2 by the Bahamas.

In the 2021 ABCS Tournament Seinpaal scored two goals for the Bonaire as the senior team defeated the Curaçao under-20 team 4–3 in the first round.

=== International goals ===
Scores and results list Bonaire's goal tally first.

No	Date	Venue	Opponent	Score	Result	Competition
1	1 June 2014	Blakes Estate Stadium, Lookout, Montserrat	U.S. Virgin Islands	1–0	2–1	2014 Caribbean Cup qualification
2	5 September 2014	Stade En Camée, Rivière-Pilote, Martinique	Suriname	2–0	3–2	2014 Caribbean Cup qualification
3	7 September 2014	Stade d'Honneur de Dillon, Fort-de-France, Martinique	Barbados	1–4	1–4	2014 Caribbean Cup qualification
4	6 September 2019	Ergilio Hato Stadium, Willemstad, Curaçao	British Virgin Islands	2–1	4–2	2019–20 CONCACAF Nations League C
5	9 September 2019	Thomas Robinson Stadium, Nassau, Bahamas	Bahamas	1–2	1–2	2019–20 CONCACAF Nations League C
6	24 November 2022	Stadion Rignaal Jean Francisca, Willemstad, Curaçao	Suriname	1–3	1–4	2022 ABCS Tournament
Last updated 24 November 2022

=== International appearances ===
As of match played 23 October 2022

National team	Year	Apps	Goals
Bonaire	2013	2	0
Bonaire	2014	5	3
Bonaire	2015	1	0
Bonaire	2016	0	0
Bonaire	2017	0	0
Bonaire	2018	2	0
Bonaire	2019	2	2
Bonaire	2020	0	0
Bonaire	2021	0	0
Bonaire	2022	5	1
Bonaire	2023	3	0
Total		20	6

== Achievements ==
=== Club ===
S.V. Uruguay

- Kopa MCB
  - Runners-up (2): 2013, 2014

Real Rincon

- Bonaire League
  - Champion (2): 2016/17, 2017/18
- Kopa MCB
  - Champion (1): 2015
- Concacaf Caribbean Shield
  - Bronze: 2018
- Kopa ABC
  - Champion (1): 2018

== See also ==
- List of top international men's football goalscorers by country
