= Bonaire football clubs in North American competitions =

This is a list of Bonaire clubs in North American competitions. Bonaire clubs have participated in competitive international football competitions since 2018, when Real Rincon entered the 2018 Caribbean Club Shield.

No club from Bonaire has won a CONCACAF or CFU competition.

== Who qualifies for CONCACAF competitions ==
Since 2018, the winner of the Bonaire Kampionato, the top tier of football on the island qualifies for the Caribbean Club Shield, a tertiary knockout tournament for developing Caribbean football nations. This competition is held in the spring. This also serves as a qualifying tournament for the CONCACAF League, which is played in the fall. The CONCACAF League is the secondary association football competition for club football in North America. Should a team finish in the top six standings of the CONCACAF League, they qualify for the CONCACAF Champions League, which is played the following winter.

In order for a Bonaire team to reach the Champions League, they would need to win the Caribbean Club Shield and then earn a top six finish in the CONCACAF League.

== Results by competition ==
=== CFU Club Shield ===
Season	Club	Result	Opponent	Score	Ref.
2018	Real Rincon	Third place	(Aruba) Nacional	3–1	
2019	Real Rincon	Consolation round	(Saint Lucia) Platinum	2–4	
2020	Real Rincon	Cancelled due to the COVID-19 pandemic			
2022	Real Rincon	Group B	(Guadeloupe) Gosier	1–2	
2022	Real Rincon	Group B	(Curaçao) Jong Holland	0–5	
2022	Real Rincon	Group B	(Turks and Caicos Islands) SWA Sharks FC	1–3	
2024	Real Rincon	Round of 16	(Antigua and Barbuda) Grenades F.C.	1–2	
2025	Real Rincon	Group A	(Saint Lucia) La Clery	1–1	
2025	Real Rincon	Group A	(Puerto Rico) Academia Quintana	0–3	

=== CFU Club Championship ===
Season	Club	Result	Opponent	Score	Ref.
2021	Real Rincon	Group B	(Puerto Rico) Metropolitan	0–4	
2021	Real Rincon	Group B	(Dominican Republic) Delfines del Este	0–10	

== Appearances in CONCACAF competitions ==
As of December 23, 2019

Club	Total						CCL	CFU	CCS	CWC	First Appearance	Last Appearance
Club	Apps	Pld	W	D	L	Win%	CCL	CFU	CCS	CWC	First Appearance	Last Appearance
Real Rincon	6	16	3	2	11	.250	0	1	5	0	2018 Caribbean Club Shield	2025 CFU Club Shield
