= 2003–04 Bonaire League season =

Bonaire League
- Season: 2003-04
- Champions: Real Rincon
- Matches: 42
- Goals: 141 (3.36 per match)

The 2003/04 season of the Bonearian football League played in Bonaire, Netherlands Antilles started on September 7, 2003 and the final was played on June 25, 2004.

The championship was played over 3 phases. First phase with all 7 teams, followed by a playoff with the top 4 teams and then a final with the 2 top teams. For the first times Real Rincon and Vespo were allowed to play each team once at home in the Antonio Trenidat Stadium. All remaining matches were played at Stadion Playa at Kralendijk. Defending champions Real Rincon successfully defended their titles by defeating SV Estrellas in the final 1-0.

== Regular season ==
Teams face each other 2 times. Top four teams qualify for the semifinal playoffs

	ATC	EST	JUV	RR	URU	VES	VIT
ATC		0-3	0-1	1-2	1-0	2-1	1-0
Estrellas	2-3		1-1	1-1	2-2	2-1	4-1
Juventus	0-4	0-2		0-1	2-6	4-2	0-1
Real Rincon	5-1	2-1	4-2		2-2	1-2	4-0
Uruguay	2-0	2-1	7-0	1-1		4-2	2-0
Vespo	1-3	1-4	6-2	0-3	1-2		0-0
Vitesse	0-1	0-3	2-1	1-2	1-1	3-3	

== Standing ==
pos	Team	GP	W	D	L	PNT	GF	GA	GD
1	Real Rincon	12	8	3	1	27	28	12	16
2	Uruguay	12	7	4	1	25	31	13	18
3	ATC	12	7	1	4	22	17	14	3
4	Estrellas	12	5	4	3	19	23	14	9
5	Vitesse	12	2	3	7	9	9	22	-13
6	Vespo	12	2	2	8	8	20	30	-10
7	Juventus	12	2	1	9	7	13	36	-23

== Playoffs ==
Teams face each other 2 times. Top two teams qualify for the final.

	ATC	EST	RR	URU
ATC		3-1	0-2	1-1
Estrellas	1-0		3-3	
Real Rincon	1-2	1-2		5-0
Uruguay	2-2	2-4	1-2	

== Standing ==
pos	Team	GP	W	D	L	PNT	GF	GA	GD
1	Estrellas	5	3	1	1	10	11	9	2
2	Real Rincon	6	3	1	2	10	14	8	1
3	ATC	6	2	2	2	8	8	8	0
4	Uruguay	5	0	2	3	2	6	14	-8

== Final ==
1st leg

June 18	Estrellas	0-0	Real Rincon

2nd leg

June 25	Real Rincon	1-0	Estrellas
	Jansen 54'
