= Football in Bonaire =

The sport of association football in the island of Bonaire is run by the Bonaire Football Federation. The association administers the men's national team, the women's national team, as well as the Bonaire League.

== League History ==
With football evidenced as early as 1923, Bonaire's football history is deep, albeit closely tied with that of neighbouring Curaçao. Competition started sporadically, with two attempted associations starting and subsequently folding. Evidence of the league is very limited though, but matches off the island certainly happened as early as 10 June 1956, when Bonaire club Flamingo played Blitz from Sint Maarten, with further matches in 1959 and 1961 on Aruba.

The modern Bonaire Football Federation formed in 1960, with the Bonaire League finally forming in a lasting format. It would only not be held in a bare handful of years from then, though would change between a single year tournament (e.g. 1960) or one spread across 2 years (e.g. 1960–61). SV Estrellas would establish themselves as the early frontrunners, followed by SV Vitesse. SV Juventus would split off from Vitesse and hold the record for the most titles, though SV Real Rincon are close behind and have won the last 5 titles as of the end of 2021.

The men's champions would also take part in the majority of the Netherlands Antilles Championship seasons from 1972 until the dissolution of the Netherlands Antilles in 2010. However, no Bonaire club would ever win a title from this, with Curaçao clubs dominating.

While discussions have been held on a possible women's league in 2017, there has been no further development on the subject as of 2022. An indoor league for futsal has been started in 2021 though.

Level	League(s)/Division(s)
1	Bonaire League; 9 clubs

== National Sides ==
The men's national team have been active for many years, with unofficial national sides playing matches across their full footballing history. They would become an official team after the Netherlands Antilles would dissolve, with previously their players playing for the Netherlands Antilles national football team, though rarely. From then on they would participate in the ABCS Tournament until their admission into CONCACAF and the Caribbean Football Union where they would also start to play in the CONCACAF Gold Cup, the Caribbean Cup and the CONCACAF Nations League. Results have generally been poor, with the team playing the first two seasons of the Nations League in League C, but they have managed some successes against other low ranked sides. Youth football has been limited, but sides were sent to 2019 CONCACAF U-17 Championship qualifying, 2017 CONCACAF Boys' Under-15 Championship and 2019 CONCACAF Boys' Under-15 Championship which each had positive results.

The women's national team debuted against several club sides from the Dutch Caribbean in the 2015 and 2017 Dutch Caribbean Women's Soccer Cups with victories over Oualichi WST (Sint Maarten) but losses to SV Oema Sosa (Suriname), C.V.V. Inter Willemstad (Curaçao), SUBT (Curaçao) and SV Britannia (Aruba). Youth teams have participated in 2018 CONCACAF Women's U-20 Championship qualification, 2020 CONCACAF Women's U-17 Championship qualification and the 2018 CFU Girls U14 Challenge Series but results were poor and neither side have since returned.

== See also ==
- Soccer in Saba
