= 2018 Caribbean Club Shield =

2018 CONCACAF Caribbean Club Shield
Tournament details
- Host country: Dominican Republic
- City: Santiago de los Caballeros
- Dates: 13–21 April 2018
- Teams: 12 (from 12 associations)
- Venues: 3 (in 1 host city)

Final positions
- Champions: (Martinique) Club Franciscain (1st title)
- Runners-up: (Suriname) Inter Moengotapoe
- Third place: (Bonaire) Real Rincon
- Fourth place: (Aruba) Nacional

Tournament statistics
- Matches played: 19
- Goals scored: 75 (3.95 per match)
- Top scorer: (Suriname) Stefano Rijssel (6 goals)

The 2018 Caribbean Club Shield was the first edition of the Caribbean Club Shield (also known as the CFU Club Shield), the second-tier annual international club football competition in the Caribbean region, held amongst clubs whose football associations are affiliated with the Caribbean Football Union (CFU), a sub-confederation of CONCACAF. The tournament was played in the Dominican Republic between 13–21 April 2018.

The winners of the 2018 CONCACAF Caribbean Club Shield, as long as they fulfill the CONCACAF Regional Club Licensing criteria, would play against the fourth place team of the 2018 CONCACAF Caribbean Club Championship in a playoff match to determine the final Caribbean spot to the 2018 CONCACAF League.

Club Franciscain won the inaugural CONCACAF Caribbean Club Shield, and later defeated Central in a playoff to qualify for the CONCACAF League.

== Teams ==
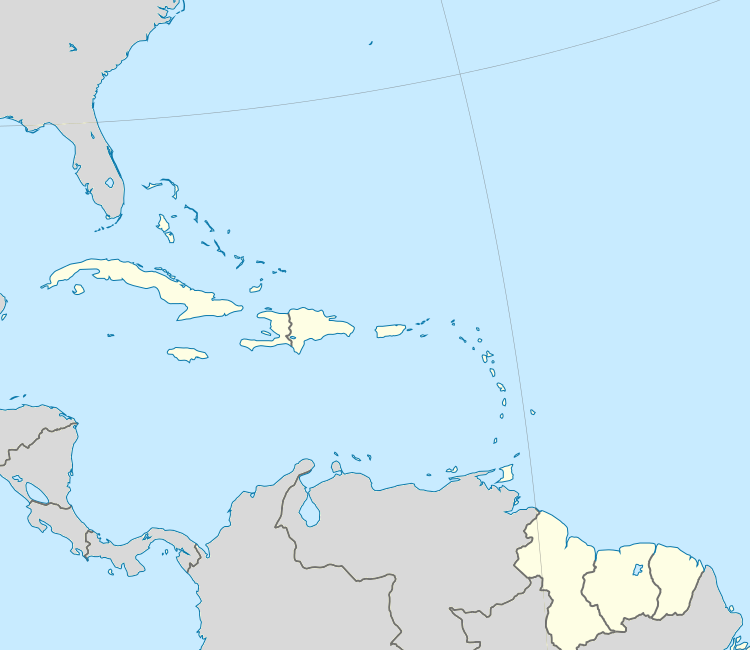
Location of teams of the 2018 CONCACAF Caribbean Club Shield

The CONCACAF Council, at its meeting on 25 July 2017 in San Francisco, California approved the implementation of the following two-tier competitions for affiliated clubs of Caribbean Member Associations starting in 2018:

- The Tier 1 competition, known as the CONCACAF Caribbean Club Championship, is contested by the champions and runners-up of the top professional and semi-professional leagues in year 1 (2018), and open to only fully professional leagues in year 2 (2019) and onwards.
- The Tier 2 competition, known as the CONCACAF Caribbean Club Shield, is contested by the champions of the top leagues in Member Associations that have no professional or semi-professional leagues in year 1 (2018), and open to amateur and semi-professional leagues in year 2 (2019) and onwards.

The new two-tier format of the CONCACAF Caribbean Club Championship and CONCACAF Caribbean Club Shield, as well as the teams participating in each tournament, were announced by CONCACAF on 15 December 2017. Among the 31 CFU member associations, 27 of them were classified as non-professional leagues and each may enter one team in the CONCACAF Caribbean Club Shield.

A total of 12 teams from 12 associations entered the 2018 CONCACAF Caribbean Club Shield.

Association	Team	Qualification method	App. (last)	Previous best (last)
Aruba	Nacional	2016–17 Aruban Division di Honor champions	1st	Debut
Barbados	Weymouth Wales	2017 Barbados Premier League champions	1st	Debut
Bonaire	Real Rincon	2016–17 Bonaire League champions	1st	Debut
Cayman Islands	Bodden Town	2016–17 Cayman Islands Premier League champions	1st	Debut
Curaçao	Centro Dominguito	2017 Curaçao Sekshon Pagá champions	1st	Debut
Grenada	Hard Rock	2016 GFA Premier Division champions	1st	Debut
Guadeloupe	USR	2016–17 Guadeloupe Division of Honor champions	1st	Debut
Guyana	Guyana Defence Force	2016–17 GFF Elite League champions	1st	Debut
Martinique	Club Franciscain	2016–17 Martinique Championnat National champions	1st	Debut
Saint Kitts and Nevis	Cayon Rockets	2016–17 SKNFA Super League champions	1st	Debut
Saint Vincent and the Grenadines	Avenues United	2017 NLA Premier League champions	1st	Debut
Suriname	Inter Moengotapoe	2016–17 SVB Topklasse champions	1st	Debut

Associations which did not enter a team

- Anguilla
- Antigua and Barbuda
- Bahamas
- Bermuda
- British Virgin Islands
- Cuba
- Dominica
- French Guiana
- Montserrat
- Puerto Rico
- Saint Lucia
- Saint Martin
- Sint Maarten
- Turks and Caicos Islands
- U.S. Virgin Islands

== Venues ==
The Dominican Republic was announced as the host nation on 15 February 2018. Host venues, all located at Santiago de los Caballeros, were:

- Estadio Cibao FC
- PUCMM
- Universidad ISA

== Group stage ==
The draw for the group stage was held on 15 February 2018, 11:00 EST (UTC−5), at the CONCACAF Headquarters in Miami, United States, and was streamed on YouTube. The 12 teams were drawn into three groups of four without any seeding.

The winners of each group and the best runners-up advanced to the semi-finals.

All times local, AST (UTC−4).

=== Group A ===
Pos	Team	Pld	W	D	L	GF	GA	GD	Pts	Qualification
1	(Suriname) Inter Moengotapoe	3	3	0	0	15	1	+14	9	Semi-finals
2	(Aruba) Nacional	3	2	0	1	5	7	−2	6	Semi-finals
3	(Guadeloupe) USR	3	1	0	2	3	8	−5	3	
4	(Barbados) Weymouth Wales	3	0	0	3	3	10	−7	0	

Source: CONCACAF
13 April 2018
14:00

Nacional (Aruba)	0–5	(Suriname) Inter Moengotapoe
	Report	Kastiel 2'; Fer 32'; Rijssel 34'; Darson 36'; Eduards 66'

Estadio Cibao FC, Santiago de los Caballeros
Referee: Kevin Morrison (Jamaica)
13 April 2018
16:30

Weymouth Wales (Barbados)	1–2	(Guadeloupe) USR
Holligan 47'	Report	Désert 27' (pen.); Lundy 78'

Estadio Cibao FC, Santiago de los Caballeros
Referee: Nitzar Sandoval (Nicaragua)

15 April 2018
14:00

Inter Moengotapoe (Suriname)	5–0	(Barbados) Weymouth Wales
Rijssel 2', 47', 71', 74'; Kastiel 81'	Report

Estadio Cibao FC, Santiago de los Caballeros
Referee: Keylor Herrera (Costa Rica)
15 April 2018
16:30

USR (Guadeloupe)	0–2	(Aruba) Nacional
	Report	Ranger 16'; Oliveros 45+1'

PUCMM, Santiago de los Caballeros
Referee: Adonis Carrasco (Dominican Republic)

17 April 2018
14:00

Weymouth Wales (Barbados)	2–3	(Aruba) Nacional
Lawrence 90'; Harewood 90+2'	Report	Aguirre 4'; Ranger 24'; Fontalvo 69'

Universidad ISA, Santiago de los Caballeros
Referee: Tristley Bassue (St Kitts & Nevis)
17 April 2018
16:30

USR (Guadeloupe)	1–5	(Suriname) Inter Moengotapoe
Désert 83'	Report	Baja 6'; Rijssel 37'; Holtuin 64', 88'; Fer 78'

Universidad ISA, Santiago de los Caballeros
Referee: Nitzar Sandoval (Nicaragua)

=== Group B ===
Pos	Team	Pld	W	D	L	GF	GA	GD	Pts	Qualification
1	(Bonaire) Real Rincon	2	1	1	0	5	3	+2	4	Semi-finals
2	(Saint Vincent and the Grenadines) Avenues United	2	1	1	0	5	4	+1	4	
3	(Grenada) Hard Rock	2	0	0	2	3	6	−3	0	
4	Guyana Defence Force	0	0	0	0	0	0	0	0	Withdrew

Source: CONCACAF
13 April 2018
16:30

Hard Rock (Grenada)	1–3	(Bonaire) Real Rincon
Alexander 73'	Report	Seinpaal 57', 59'; Piar 66'

Universidad ISA, Santiago de los Caballeros
Referee: Karl Tyrell (Jamaica)

15 April 2018
16:30

Avenues United (Saint Vincent and the Grenadines)	3–2	(Grenada) Hard Rock
Cunningham 14'; Snagg 47'; Samuel 72'	Report	Alleyne 36'; Williams 50'

Estadio Cibao FC, Santiago de los Caballeros
Referee: Christophe Jombert (Guadeloupe)

17 April 2018
11:00

Real Rincon (Bonaire)	2–2	(Saint Vincent and the Grenadines) Avenues United
Windster 82'; R. Frans 90'	Report	Samuel 5'; Snagg 62'

Estadio Cibao FC, Santiago de los Caballeros
Referee: Karl Tyrell (Jamaica)

=== Group C ===
Pos	Team	Pld	W	D	L	GF	GA	GD	Pts	Qualification
1	(Martinique) Club Franciscain	3	2	0	1	12	4	+8	6	Semi-finals
2	(Curaçao) Centro Dominguito	3	1	2	0	4	3	+1	5	
3	(Cayman Islands) Bodden Town	3	1	1	1	4	6	−2	4	
4	(Saint Kitts and Nevis) Cayon Rockets	3	0	1	2	3	10	−7	1	

Source: CONCACAF
13 April 2018
14:00

Cayon Rockets (Saint Kitts and Nevis)	1–2	(Cayman Islands) Bodden Town
Barnes 65'	Report	Brown 34'; McLean 81'

PUCMM, Santiago de los Caballeros
Referee: Benbito Celima (Haiti)
13 April 2018
16:30

Centro Dominguito (Curaçao)	2–1	(Martinique) Club Franciscain
Matheus 4', 88'	Report	Maingé 40'

PUCMM, Santiago de los Caballeros
Referee: Tristley Bassue (St Kitts & Nevis)

15 April 2018
14:00

Bodden Town (Cayman Islands)	0–0	(Curaçao) Centro Dominguito
	Report

Universidad ISA, Santiago de los Caballeros
Referee: Gianni Ascani (Turks & Caicos)
15 April 2018
16:30

Club Franciscain (Martinique)	6–0	(Saint Kitts and Nevis) Cayon Rockets
Maingé 16', 22'; Thimon 29', 45', 62'; Abaul 63'	Report

Universidad ISA, Santiago de los Caballeros
Referee: Johannes Dolaini (Suriname)

17 April 2018
14:00

Centro Dominguito (Curaçao)	2–2	(Saint Kitts and Nevis) Cayon Rockets
Morton 68' (o.g.); Calvenhoven 79'	Report	Bertie 56'; Thom 89'

Estadio Cibao FC, Santiago de los Caballeros
Referee: Ydekel Capellan (Dominican Republic)
17 April 2018
16:30

Club Franciscain (Martinique)	5–2	(Cayman Islands) Bodden Town
Tarrieu 21'; Marajo 28'; Thimon 37'; Abaul 54'; Jougon 89'	Report	Levien 11'; James 70'

Estadio Cibao FC, Santiago de los Caballeros
Referee: Sergio Reyna (Guatemala)

=== Ranking of group winners and runners-up ===
Pos	Grp	Team	Pld	W	D	L	GF	GA	GD	Pts	Qualification
1	A	(Suriname) Inter Moengotapoe	3	3	0	0	15	1	+14	9	Semi-finals
2	C	(Martinique) Club Franciscain	3	2	0	1	12	4	+8	6	Semi-finals
3	B	(Bonaire) Real Rincon	2	1	1	0	5	3	+2	4	Semi-finals
4	A	(Aruba) Nacional	3	2	0	1	5	7	−2	6	Semi-finals
5	C	(Curaçao) Centro Dominguito	3	1	2	0	4	3	+1	5	
6	B	(Saint Vincent and the Grenadines) Avenues United	2	1	1	0	5	4	+1	4	

Source: CONCACAF

== Knockout stage ==
=== Bracket ===
The semi-final matchups are:

- Best Group Winners vs. Best Group Runners-up
- 2nd Best Group Winners vs. 3rd Best Group Winners

Semi-finals
19 April
(Suriname) Inter Moengotapoe	4
(Aruba) Nacional	0
19 April
(Martinique) Club Franciscain	2
(Bonaire) Real Rincon	0

Final
21 April
(Suriname) Inter Moengotapoe	1
(Martinique) Club Franciscain	2
Third place
21 April
(Aruba) Nacional	1
(Bonaire) Real Rincon	3

=== Semi-finals ===
19 April 2018
17:30

Inter Moengotapoe (Suriname)	4–0	(Aruba) Nacional
Baja 47'; Kastiel 54', 67'; Vlijter 61'	Report

Estadio Cibao FC, Santiago de los Caballeros
Referee: Adonis Carrasco (Dominican Republic)

19 April 2018
20:00

Club Franciscain (Martinique)	2–0	(Bonaire) Real Rincon
Abaul 68'; Ephestion 72'	Report

Estadio Cibao FC, Santiago de los Caballeros
Referee: Keylor Herrera (Costa Rica)

=== Third place match ===
21 April 2018
17:30

Nacional (Aruba)	1–3	(Bonaire) Real Rincon
Oliveros 36'	Report	Cicilia 7', 30'; T. Frans 12'

Estadio Cibao FC, Santiago de los Caballeros
Referee: Sergio Reyna (Guatemala)

=== Final ===
Winners advanced to CONCACAF League playoff against the 2018 CONCACAF Caribbean Club Championship fourth-placed team for a place in the 2018 CONCACAF League.

21 April 2018
20:00

Inter Moengotapoe (Suriname)	1–2	(Martinique) Club Franciscain
Kastiel 5'	Report	Maingé 15'; Thimon 43'

Estadio Cibao FC, Santiago de los Caballeros
Referee: Kevin Morrison (Jamaica)

== Top goalscorers ==
Rank	Player	Team	Goals
1	(Suriname) Stefano Rijssel	(Suriname) Inter Moengotapoe	6
2	(Suriname) Romeo Kastiel	(Suriname) Inter Moengotapoe	5
2	(Martinique) Yann Thimon	(Martinique) Club Franciscain	5
4	(Martinique) Djénhael Maingé	(Martinique) Club Franciscain	4
5	(Martinique) Stéphane Abaul	(Martinique) Club Franciscain	3
6	(Suriname) Joël Baja	(Suriname) Inter Moengotapoe	2
6	(Guadeloupe) Steeve Désert	(Guadeloupe) USR	2
6	(Suriname) Donnegy Fer	(Suriname) Inter Moengotapoe	2
6	(Suriname) Romano Holtuin	(Suriname) Inter Moengotapoe	2
6	(Curaçao) Samuel Matheus	(Curaçao) Centro Dominguito	2
6	(Colombia) Devis Oliveros	(Aruba) Nacional	2
6	(Aruba) Kenroy Ranger	(Aruba) Nacional	2
6	(Bonaire) Yurick Seinpaal	(Bonaire) Real Rincon	2
6	(Saint Vincent and the Grenadines) Romano Snagg	(Saint Vincent and the Grenadines) Avenues United	2

== See also ==
- 2018 Caribbean Club Championship
- 2018 CONCACAF League
- 2019 CONCACAF Champions League
