= 2014 Bonaire League =

Bonaire League
- Season: 2014
- Champions: Real Rincon
- Matches: 58
- Goals: 262 (4.52 per match)
- Longest winning run: 12 matches: Real Rincon
- Longest unbeaten run: 13 matches: Real Rincon
- Longest losing run: 7 matches: Arriba Perú

The 2014 Bonaire League season was the 46th season of the Bonaire League.

== Teams ==
Nine teams compete in the league with SV Juventus defending its title from the 2013 season. The number of teams for 2014 remains the same with no relegation or promotion from the previous season. All clubs play their games at Stadion Antonio Trenidat in Rincon. The stadium has a capacity of 1,500 people.

== Table and Results ==
=== Standings ===
Pos	Team	Pld	W	D	L	GF	GA	GD	Pts	Qualification
1	Real Rincon	16	14	2	0	75	13	+62	44	Playoff Stage
2	Juventus	16	13	1	2	73	17	+56	40	Playoff Stage
3	Uruguay	16	11	2	3	51	22	+29	35	Playoff Stage
4	Estrellas	16	8	2	6	32	16	+16	26	Playoff Stage
5	Vespo	16	6	2	8	36	27	+9	20	
6	Atlétiko Flamingo	16	5	3	8	21	53	−32	18	
7	Vitesse	16	3	3	10	26	42	−16	12	
8	Arriba Perú	16	2	2	12	16	66	−50	8	
9	ATC	16	1	1	14	16	90	−74	4	

Updated to match(es) played on 10 October 2014. Source: Standings
Rules for classification: 1) points; 2) goal difference; 3) number of goals scored.

=== Results ===
Home \ Away	ARR	ATC	ATF	EST	JUV	REA	URU	VES	VIT
Arriba Perú		1–0	2–3	0–6	1–10	0–6	0–7	1–2	0–0
ATC	2–7		0–1	0–4	1–10	0–8	0–5	2–16	1–5
Atlétiko Flamingo	1–1	5–1		0–3	1–9	0–10	0–1	2–2	2–0
Estrellas	3–0	4–2	1–1		1–3	2–3	2–3	3–1	0–0
Juventus	8–0	8–2	3–1	1–0		1–2	3–4	2–0	6–1
Real Rincon	7–0	5–0	9–1	1–0	1–1		4–1	3–1	3–0
Uruguay	5–1	10–1	4–0	0–2	0–1	3–3		2–1	1–1
Vespo	4–1	1–1	1–2	1–0	0–1	0–4	1–2		2–1
Vitesse	3–1	2–3	6–3	0–2	2–6	3–6	2–3	0–3	

Legend: Blue = home team win; Yellow = draw; Red = away team win.
