= Gerritson Craane =

Dutch Caribbean professional footballer

Personal information
- Full name: Gerritson A. Craane
- Date of birth: 17 February 1994 (age 32)
- Place of birth: Kralendijk, Bonaire
- Height: 5 ft 11 in (1.80 m)
- Positions: Forward; defender

Youth career
- DOS Kampen
- 2012–2013: Trinity Christian Academy

College career
Years	Team	Apps	(Gls)
2013–2016	Southeastern Fire	65	(24)

Senior career*
Years	Team	Apps	(Gls)
2011–2013	S.V. Uruguay		
2015	Ocala Stampede	5	(0)
2016–2018	Florida Tropics SC (indoor)	8	(0)
2019–2020	Tropics SC		
2020	Florida Tropics SC (indoor)	0	(0)

International career^{‡}
2010	Netherlands Antilles U17	2	(0)
2010–2011	Netherlands Antilles U20	5	(0)
2012	Curaçao	1	(0)

Managerial career
- 2019–: Lakeland Christian Vikings
- 2021–: Florida Tropics (Academy)
- –2022: Polk State Eagles (women's assistant)
- 2025–: Southeastern Fire (interim)
- * Club domestic league appearances and goals as of 14 August 2025 ‡ National team caps and goals as of 23:00, 15 November 2015 (UTC)

Gerritson Craane (born 17 February 1994 on Bonaire) is a Dutch Caribbean professional footballer who is currently the interim head coach for the Southeastern University men's soccer team.

== Career ==
=== Youth and college ===
As a youth on Bonaire, Craane was an accomplished futsal player. At a young age, he also worked his way through the youth ranks of DOS Kampen, a lower division team in the Netherlands, until at least 2004 when he was with the E1 squad. He had previously been a member of the F10, F6, and F1 squads. Craane attended high school at Trinity Christian Academy in Florida, United States from 2012 to 2013. During his senior season, he set a team record of 20 assists while leading the team in scoring with 39 goals. Following the season, he was named to the First Team All-County, First Team All-Area by the Palm Beach Post, and team MVP. In July 2013, Craane signed a letter of intent to play college soccer for the Fire of Southeastern University. He scored in his first collegiate match, an eventual 2–3 defeat. In total, he made 16 appearances during his freshman season, leading the team in scoring with nine goals and scoring in six consecutive matches. As a sophomore, Craane appeared in eleven matches before suffering a season-ending injury. Despite his injury, he tallied six goals and three assists and earned All-Conference Honorable Mention honors for The Sun Conference. The next season, 2015, he scored four goals in eighteen matches after returning from injury. The Fire went on to be crowned The Sun Conference Champions that season, with Craane setting up the game-winning goal with a run down the flank before sending a cross into the box in the championship match. Including the playoffs, Craane tallied a team high of 11 assists for the season and was named to The Sun Conference All-Conference Second Team. While at SEU, Craane was teammates with fellow Bonaire native and Bonaire international Justin Michel.

=== Professional ===
From 2011 to 2013, Craane has played for S.V. Uruguay of the Bonaire League. He appeared in the 2012 Kopa MCB for the club and scored a goal in a 3–0 victory over SV Vitesse. While still in college in 2015, Craane played for the Ocala Stampede of the Premier Development League, the fourth tier of the United States soccer league system. During the season, he made five appearances without tallying a goal or assist. The team finished the season as champions of the Southeast Division for the fourth consecutive year. The Stampede went on to lose 1–2 to the New York Red Bulls U-23 in extra time in the semi-final of the playoffs with the match held at Starfire Sports Complex in Seattle. On 13 May 2015, Craane also appeared in the Stampede's first round match of the 2015 Lamar Hunt U.S. Open Cup. He was an 84th-minute substitute as his side fell 2–4 on penalties to Chattanooga FC.

Since graduating from Southeastern University, Craane has stayed in Lakeland, playing professionally for the Florida Tropics SC of the Major Arena Soccer League. In March 2019, Craane became a member of the Tropics' first professional outdoor team, Tropics SC of the United Premier Soccer League.

After taking some time off from the indoor game, Craane rejoined the Tropics MASL squad in February 2020.

=== International ===
Born on Bonaire, Craane represented the Netherlands Antilles at the U17 level and U20 levels and Curaçao at the senior level after the Netherlands Antilles was dissolved as a unified political entity on 10 October 2010. In 2010, he represented the Netherlands Antilles during 2011 CONCACAF U-17 Championship qualification. He appeared in two of the team's three matches as they finished second in their group and failed to qualify for the 2011 CONCACAF U-17 Championship. Later that year, he represented the Netherlands Antilles again during 2011 CONCACAF U-20 Championship qualifying. He appeared in five of six of the team's matches as they once again failed to qualify for the final tournament. In 2012, Craane represented Curaçao, the successor of the Netherlands Antilles team, at the 2012 ABCS Tournament. He started and played all 90 minutes of the side's 2–3 defeat to Aruba in the first round. In 2013, Craane's native Bonaire became a member of CONCACAF and the Caribbean Football Union. In December 2015, Craane was named to a provisional squad by Bonaire head coach Ferdinand Bernabela in preparation for 2016 Caribbean Cup qualification.

=== Coaching ===
Since 2021, Craane has led the Florida Tropics Academy. He has also spent six seasons as a coach for both the boys and girls teams at Lakeland Christian School, during which time the girls won four straight state championships. Craane has served as an assistant coach at both Polk State College and Southeastern University, and in July 2025 was appointed interim head coach for the Southeastern Fire men's team.

== Honours ==
- PDL Southeast Division Champion: 2015
