= 2019 Caribbean Club Shield =

2019 CONCACAF Caribbean Club Shield
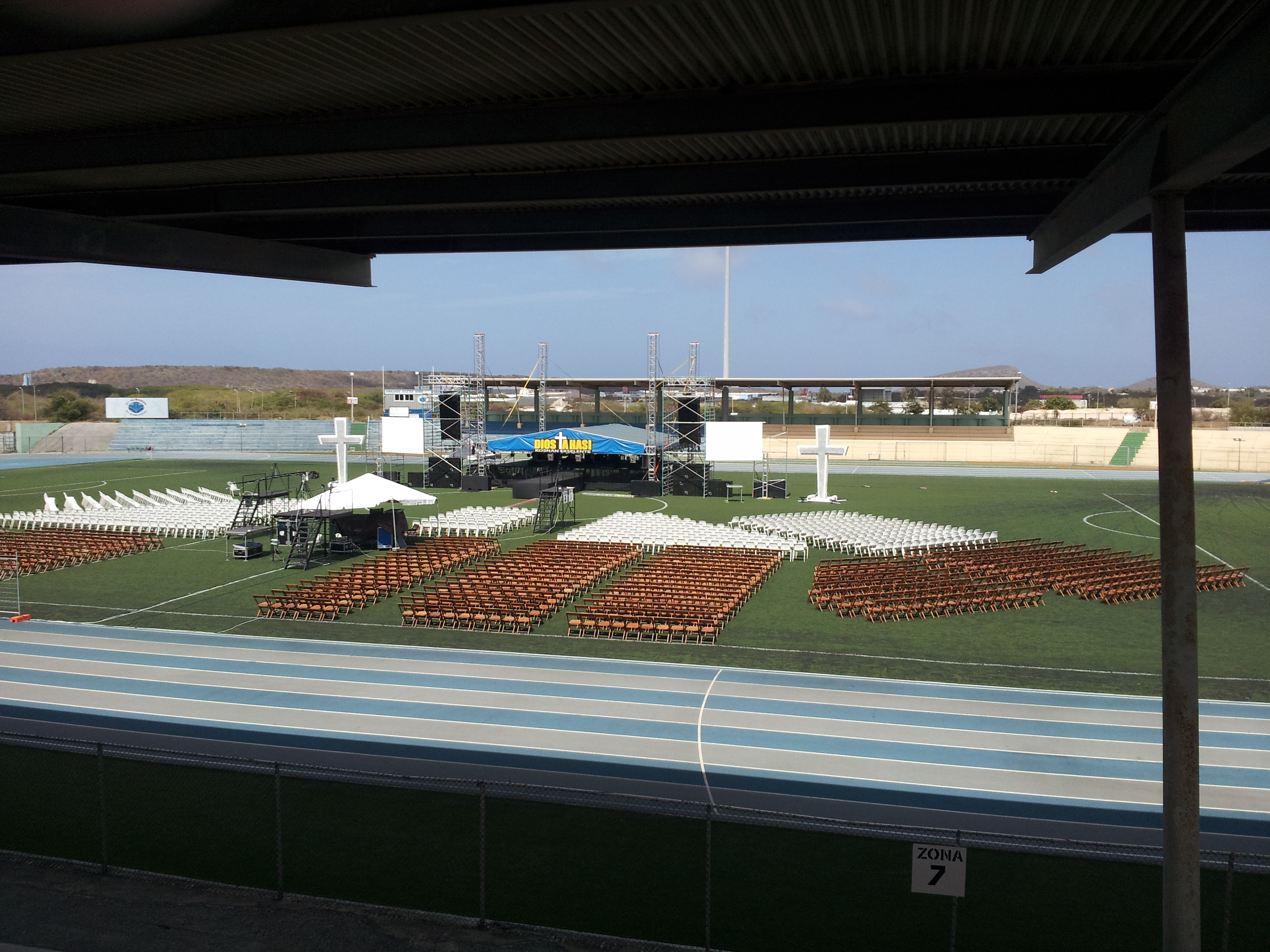
- The Ergilio Hato Stadium in Willemstad hosted the final.

Tournament details
- Host country: Curaçao
- City: Willemstad
- Dates: 5–15 April 2019
- Teams: 13 (from 13 associations)
- Venues: 2 (in 1 host city)

Final positions
- Champions: (Suriname) Robinhood (1st title)
- Runners-up: (Martinique) Club Franciscain

Tournament statistics
- Matches played: 24
- Goals scored: 61 (2.54 per match)
- Top scorer: (Suriname) Stefano Rijssel (4 goals)

The 2019 Caribbean Club Shield was the second edition of the Caribbean Club Shield (also known as the CFU Club Shield), the second-tier annual international club football competition in the Caribbean region, held amongst clubs whose football associations are affiliated with the Caribbean Football Union (CFU), a sub-confederation of CONCACAF. The tournament was played in Curaçao between 5–15 April 2019.

The winners of the 2019 CONCACAF Caribbean Club Shield, as long as they fulfill the CONCACAF Regional Club Licensing criteria, would play against the fourth place team of the 2019 CONCACAF Caribbean Club Championship in a playoff match to determine the final Caribbean spot to the 2019 CONCACAF League.

Robinhood defeated title holders Club Franciscain in the final to win their first CONCACAF Caribbean Club Shield, and later defeated Real Hope in a playoff to qualify for the CONCACAF League.

== Teams ==
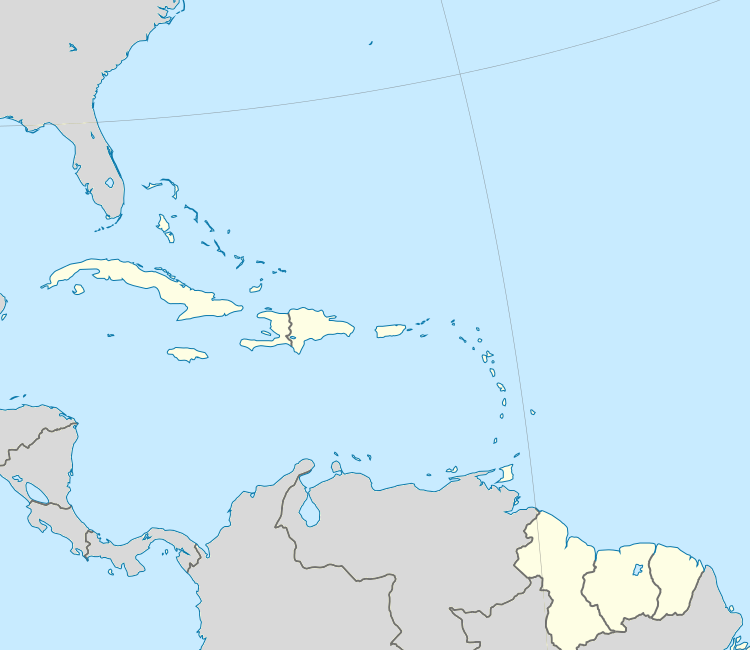
Location of teams of the 2019 CONCACAF Caribbean Club Shield
(H) Host.

Among the 31 CFU member associations, 27 of them were classified as non-professional leagues and each may enter one team in the CONCACAF Caribbean Club Shield. A total of 13 teams (from 13 associations) entered the 2019 CONCACAF Caribbean Club Shield.

Association	Team	Qualification method	App. (last)	Previous best (last)
Antigua and Barbuda	Hoppers	2017–18 Antigua and Barbuda Premier Division champions	1st	Debut
Aruba	Dakota	2017–18 Aruban Division di Honor champions	1st	Debut
Barbados	Weymouth Wales	2018 Barbados Premier League champions	2nd (2018)	Group stage (2018)
Bonaire	Real Rincon	2017–18 Bonaire League champions	2nd (2018)	Third place (2018)
Cayman Islands	Scholars International	2017–18 Cayman Islands Premier League champions	1st	Debut
Cuba	Santiago de Cuba	2018 Campeonato Nacional de Fútbol de Cuba champions	1st	Debut
Curaçao (hosts)	Jong Holland	2017–18 Curaçao Promé Divishon champions	1st	Debut
Guadeloupe	Moulien	2017–18 Guadeloupe Division of Honor champions	1st	Debut
Guyana	Fruta Conquerors	2017–18 GFF Elite League champions	1st	Debut
Martinique	Club Franciscain	2017–18 Martinique Championnat National champions	2nd (2018)	Champions (2018)
Saint Kitts and Nevis	Village Superstars	2017–18 SKNFA Premier League champions	1st	Debut
Saint Lucia	Platinum FC	2018 SLFA First Division champions	1st	Debut
Suriname	Robinhood	2017–18 SVB Topklasse champions	1st	Debut

Associations which did not enter a team

- Anguilla
- Bahamas
- Bermuda
- British Virgin Islands
- Dominica
- French Guiana
- Grenada
- Montserrat
- Puerto Rico
- Saint Martin
- Saint Vincent and the Grenadines
- Sint Maarten
- Turks and Caicos Islands
- U.S. Virgin Islands

== Venues ==
The matches were played at the Ergilio Hato Stadium and Stadion dr. Antoine Maduro in Willemstad.

== Match officials ==
Referees

- (El Salvador) Jaime Herrera (El Salvador)
- (Puerto Rico) William Anderson (Puerto Rico)
- Ricangel de Leca (Aruba)
- Sherwin Johnson (Guyana)
- Charvis Delsol (Dominica)
- (Saint Vincent and the Grenadines) Moeth Gaymes (Saint Vincent and the Grenadines)
- Damien Rosa (Martinique)
- (Costa Rica) Steven Madrigal (Costa Rica)
- Benbito Celima (Haiti)
- Patrick Senecharles (Haiti)
- (French Guiana) Gregory Prevot (French Guiana)
- Juniel Adelina (Curaçao)

Assistant Referees

- Jermaine Yee Sing (Jamaica)
- (Antigua and Barbuda) Wasnah Barnarde (Antigua and Barbuda)
- (Puerto Rico) Jairo Morales (Puerto Rico)
- (El Salvador) José Mangandi (El Salvador)
- Kleon Lindey (Guyana)
- Jade Garcia Salamatin (Aruba)
- Clide Cadette (Dominica)
- Wilson Tilus (Haiti)
- Yordanis Gomez (Cuba)
- Clenton Daniel (Grenada)
- Rayner Goedgedrag (Curaçao)
- Alegandro Wilson (Curaçao)

== Group stage ==
The draw for the group stage was held on 11 January 2019, 11:00 EST (UTC−5), at the CONCACAF Headquarters in Miami, United States. The 13 teams were drawn into four groups: one group of four teams and three groups of three teams. The team from the host association Curaçao, Jong Holland, were allocated to position A1, while the remaining 12 teams were drawn into the other group positions without any seeding.

The winners and runners-up of each group advance to the quarter-finals. The third-placed teams play in the consolation matches.

All times local, AST (UTC−4).

=== Group A ===
Pos	Team	Pld	W	D	L	GF	GA	GD	Pts	Qualification
1	Santiago de Cuba	3	1	2	0	4	0	+4	5	Knockout stage
2	(Curaçao) Jong Holland (H)	3	1	2	0	1	0	+1	5	Knockout stage
3	(Cayman Islands) Scholars International	3	1	1	1	2	1	+1	4	Consolation matches
4	(Guyana) Fruta Conquerors	3	0	1	2	0	6	−6	1	

Source: CONCACAF
(H) Hosts
5 April 2019
15:00

Scholars International (Cayman Islands)	2–0	(Guyana) Fruta Conquerors
Mills 42' (o.g.); García 90+4'	Report

Ergilio Hato Stadium, Willemstad
Referee: Ricangel de Leca (Aruba)
5 April 2019
20:00

Jong Holland (Curaçao)	0–0	Santiago de Cuba
	Report

Ergilio Hato Stadium, Willemstad
Referee: Sherwin Johnson (Guyana)

7 April 2019
20:00

Fruta Conquerors (Guyana)	0–0	(Curaçao) Jong Holland
	Report

Ergilio Hato Stadium, Willemstad
Referee: Moeth Gaymes (Saint Vincent and the Grenadines)
7 April 2019
20:00

Santiago de Cuba	0–0	(Cayman Islands) Scholars International
	Report

Stadion dr. Antoine Maduro, Willemstad
Referee: William Anderson (Puerto Rico)

9 April 2019
20:00

Santiago de Cuba	4–0	(Guyana) Fruta Conquerors
Abreu 40', 50'; Villalón 43'; Olivares 71'	Report

Stadion dr. Antoine Maduro, Willemstad
Referee: Damien Rosa (Martinique)
9 April 2019
20:00

Jong Holland (Curaçao)	1–0	(Cayman Islands) Scholars International
Acosta 38'	Report

Ergilio Hato Stadium, Willemstad
Referee: Jaime Herrera (El Salvador)

=== Group B ===
Pos	Team	Pld	W	D	L	GF	GA	GD	Pts	Qualification
1	(Guadeloupe) Moulien	2	2	0	0	2	0	+2	6	Knockout stage
2	(Barbados) Weymouth Wales	2	1	0	1	1	1	0	3	Knockout stage
3	(Bonaire) Real Rincon	2	0	0	2	0	2	−2	0	Consolation matches

Source: CONCACAF
5 April 2019
17:30

Weymouth Wales (Barbados)	0–1	(Guadeloupe) Moulien
	Report	Janky 38'

Ergilio Hato Stadium, Willemstad
Referee: Patrick Senecharles (Haiti)

7 April 2019
17:30

Real Rincon (Bonaire)	0–1	(Guadeloupe) Moulien
	Report	Valmy 54'

Stadion dr. Antoine Maduro, Willemstad
Referee: Juniel Adelina (Curaçao)

9 April 2019
17:30

Weymouth Wales (Barbados)	1–0	(Bonaire) Real Rincon
Harewood 53'	Report

Ergilio Hato Stadium, Willemstad
Referee: William Anderson (Puerto Rico)

=== Group C ===
Pos	Team	Pld	W	D	L	GF	GA	GD	Pts	Qualification
1	(Saint Kitts and Nevis) Village Superstars	2	2	0	0	4	2	+2	6	Knockout stage
2	(Antigua and Barbuda) Hoppers	2	1	0	1	6	4	+2	3	Knockout stage
3	(Saint Lucia) Platinum FC	2	0	0	2	3	7	−4	0	Consolation matches

Source: CONCACAF
5 April 2019
17:30

Hoppers (Antigua and Barbuda)	1–2	(Saint Kitts and Nevis) Village Superstars
Thomas 40'	Report	Johnson 24'; Rogers 56'

Stadion dr. Antoine Maduro, Willemstad
Referee: Steven Madrigal (Costa Rica)

7 April 2019
15:00

Platinum FC (Saint Lucia)	1–2	(Saint Kitts and Nevis) Village Superstars
President 61'	Report	Rogers 8'; Hanley 18'

Ergilio Hato Stadium, Willemstad
Referee: Gregory Prevot (French Guiana)

9 April 2019
15:00

Hoppers (Antigua and Barbuda)	5–2	(Saint Lucia) Platinum FC
Montoute 57', 61'; Kirwan 77', 90+3'; McPherson 80'	Report	Nicholas 27', 34'

Ergilio Hato Stadium, Willemstad
Referee: Benbito Celima (Haiti)

=== Group D ===
Pos	Team	Pld	W	D	L	GF	GA	GD	Pts	Qualification
1	(Martinique) Club Franciscain	2	1	1	0	4	2	+2	4	Knockout stage
2	(Suriname) Robinhood	2	1	0	1	5	4	+1	3	Knockout stage
3	(Aruba) Dakota	2	0	1	1	2	5	−3	1	Consolation matches

Source: CONCACAF
5 April 2019
20:00

Club Franciscain (Martinique)	3–1	(Suriname) Robinhood
Annette 3'; Thimon 45'; Maingé 76'	Report	Rijssel 83' (pen.)

Stadion dr. Antoine Maduro, Willemstad
Referee: Jaime Herrera (El Salvador)

7 April 2019
17:30

Dakota (Aruba)	1–4	(Suriname) Robinhood
Gross 12'	Report	Rijssel 4', 55', 63'; Eind 75'

Ergilio Hato Stadium, Willemstad
Referee: Charvis Delsol (Dominica)

9 April 2019
17:30

Club Franciscain (Martinique)	1–1	(Aruba) Dakota
Marajo 78'	Report	Maduro 29'

Stadion dr. Antoine Maduro, Willemstad
Referee: Moeth Gaymes (Saint Vincent and the Grenadines)

== Knockout stage ==
=== Qualified teams ===
Group	Winners	Runners-up
A	Santiago de Cuba	(Curaçao) Jong Holland
B	(Guadeloupe) Moulien	(Barbados) Weymouth Wales
C	(Saint Kitts and Nevis) Village Superstars	(Antigua and Barbuda) Hoppers
D	(Martinique) Club Franciscain	(Suriname) Robinhood

=== Bracket ===
Quarter-finals
11 April
Santiago de Cuba	0
(Barbados) Weymouth Wales	2
11 April
(Saint Kitts and Nevis) Village Superstars	1 (3)
(Suriname) Robinhood (p)	1 (4)
11 April
(Guadeloupe) Moulien	0
(Curaçao) Jong Holland	3
11 April
(Martinique) Club Franciscain	1
(Antigua and Barbuda) Hoppers	0

Semi-finals
13 April
(Barbados) Weymouth Wales	0
(Suriname) Robinhood	3
13 April
(Curaçao) Jong Holland	2
(Martinique) Club Franciscain	4

Final
15 April
(Suriname) Robinhood	1
(Martinique) Club Franciscain	0

=== Consolation matches ===
11 April 2019
15:00

Scholars International (Cayman Islands)	1–2	(Aruba) Dakota
Pearson 89'	Report	Gross 28'; Maduro 42'

Ergilio Hato Stadium, Willemstad
Referee: Benbito Celima (Haiti)

11 April 2019
15:00

Real Rincon (Bonaire)	2–4	(Saint Lucia) Platinum FC
Janga 48', 90'	Report	President 10'; Myers 16'; Nicholas 53'; Neptune 85'

Stadion dr. Antoine Maduro, Willemstad
Referee: Patrick Senecharles (Haiti)

=== Quarter-finals ===
11 April 2019
17:30

Santiago de Cuba	0–2	(Barbados) Weymouth Wales
	Report	Snagg 45'; Harewood 90+4'

Stadion dr. Antoine Maduro, Willemstad
Referee: Steven Madrigal (Costa Rica)

11 April 2019
17:30

Village Superstars (Saint Kitts and Nevis)	1–1	(Suriname) Robinhood
Hanley 11'	Report	Da Costa 62'
Penalties
	3–4

Ergilio Hato Stadium, Willemstad
Referee: Damien Rosa (Martinique)

11 April 2019
20:00

Moulien (Guadeloupe)	0–3	(Curaçao) Jong Holland
	Report	Constansia 17'; Hoekstra 47', 86'

Ergilio Hato Stadium, Willemstad
Referee: Charvis Delsol (Dominica)

11 April 2019
20:00

Club Franciscain (Martinique)	1–0	(Antigua and Barbuda) Hoppers
Marajo 75'	Report

Stadion dr. Antoine Maduro, Willemstad
Referee: Sherwin Johnson (Guyana)

=== Semi-finals ===
13 April 2019
17:30

Weymouth Wales (Barbados)	0–3	(Suriname) Robinhood
	Report	Graves 4'; Fer 23'; Cairo 90+2'

Ergilio Hato Stadium, Willemstad
Referee: William Anderson (Puerto Rico)

13 April 2019
20:00

Jong Holland (Curaçao)	2–4	(Martinique) Club Franciscain
Hoekstra 28'; Thimon 80' (o.g.)	Report	Abaul 20', 90+4'; Mainge 60', 67'

Ergilio Hato Stadium, Willemstad
Referee: Ricangel de Leca (Aruba)

=== Final ===
Winners advanced to CONCACAF League playoff against 2019 CONCACAF Caribbean Club Championship fourth-placed team for a place in 2019 CONCACAF League preliminary round.

15 April 2019
20:00

Robinhood (Suriname)	1–0	(Martinique) Club Franciscain
Da Costa 21'	Report

Ergilio Hato Stadium, Willemstad
Referee: Jaime Herrera (El Salvador)

== Top goalscorers ==
Rank	Player	Team	Goals
1	(Suriname) Stefano Rijssel	(Suriname) Robinhood	4
2	(Curaçao) Siebren Hoekstra	(Curaçao) Jong Holland	3
2	(Martinique) Djénhael Maingé	(Martinique) Club Franciscain	3
2	(Saint Lucia) Noah Nicholas	(Saint Lucia) Platinum FC	3
5	(Martinique) Stéphane Abaul	(Martinique) Club Franciscain	2
5	(Cuba) Rolando Abreu	Santiago de Cuba	2
5	(Brazil) Alan da Costa	(Suriname) Robinhood	2
5	(Aruba) Josh Gross	(Aruba) Dakota	2
5	(Saint Kitts and Nevis) Tahir Hanley	(Saint Kitts and Nevis) Village Superstars	2
5	(Barbados) Romario Harewood	(Barbados) Weymouth Wales	2
5	(Bonaire) Rilove Janga	(Bonaire) Real Rincon	2
5	(Antigua and Barbuda) Eugene Kirwan	(Antigua and Barbuda) Hoppers	2
5	(Aruba) Keano Maduro	(Aruba) Dakota	2
5	(Martinique) Johnny Marajo	(Martinique) Club Franciscain	2
5	(Antigua and Barbuda) Alickson Montoute	(Antigua and Barbuda) Hoppers	2
5	(Saint Lucia) Gregson President	(Saint Lucia) Platinum FC	2
5	(Saint Kitts and Nevis) Kimaree Rogers	(Saint Kitts and Nevis) Village Superstars	2

== See also ==
- 2019 Caribbean Club Championship
- 2019 CONCACAF League
- 2020 CONCACAF Champions League
