= Jafet Vlijt =

Bonaire footballer

Personal information
- Date of birth: 4 January 2008 (age 18)
- Place of birth: Kralendijk, Netherlands Antilles
- Height: 1.69 m (5 ft 7 in)
- Position: Defender

Team information
- Current team: Spartaan'20

Youth career
- 2022–2024: Atlétiko Flamingo
- 2024–: Spartaan'20

International career^{‡}
Years	Team	Apps	(Gls)
2024–	Bonaire	3	(0)
- ‡ National team caps and goals as of 17:11, 15 October 2024 (UTC)

Jafet Vlijt (born 4 January 2008) is a Bonairean footballer who currently plays for Spartaan'20 and the Bonaire national team.

== Club career ==
In April 2018, Vlijt was selected as the best footballer at a talent identification camp hosted by Jermaine Windster's Anything is Possible Academy. The camp was attended by a scout and coach from AFC Ajax. Vlijt and the camp's other top ten players were selected to participate in a professional tournament in Germany the following month. Also that year, he was awarded a tryout with FC Barcelona because of his performance in another identification camp on the island.

Vlijt eventually joined the youth academy of Bonaire League club SV Atlétiko Flamingo after it formed youth sides in 2022. In January 2024, he left the club to continue his career in the Netherlands with Spartaan'20.

== International career ==
Vlijt represented Bonaire at the under-15 level and became a top goalscorer. He made his senior international debut on 4 June 2024 in a friendly against Sint Maarten at age sixteen. He made his competitive debut the following October in a 2024–25 CONCACAF Nations League B fixture against Montserrat.

=== International career statistics ===
As of match played 10 October 2024.

Bonaire
Year	Apps	Goals
2024	3	0
Total	3	0
