= Ayrton Cicilia =

Curaçaoan-Bonairean footballer (born 2001)

Personal information
- Full name: Ayrton Andrew Renault Cicilia
- Date of birth: 2 March 2001 (age 25)
- Place of birth: Willemstad, Curaçao
- Height: 1.92 m (6 ft 4 in)
- Position: Forward

Team information
- Current team: Real Rincon
- Number: 10

Youth career
- 2010–2016: OFIR
- 2016–2017: Vespo
- 2017–2019: Real Rincon
- 2019–: Spartaan'20

Senior career*
Years	Team	Apps	(Gls)
2015–2016	Real Rincon	26	(11)
2016–2017	Vespo	27	(15)
2017–2019	Real Rincon	38	(32)
2019–2021	Spartaan'20		
2022–	Real Rincon	56	(55)

International career^{‡}
2018–	Bonaire	25	(10)
- * Club domestic league appearances and goals ‡ National team caps and goals as of 5 October 2026

Ayrton Cicilia (born 2 March 2001) is a footballer who plays as a forward for Bonaire club Real Rincon. Born in Curaçao, he plays for the Bonaire national team, of whom he is the all-time top goalscorer with ten international goals.

== Club career ==
Cicilia has played for Real Rincon of the Bonaire League since at least 2015. In 2016 he was named Bonaire's male football MVP because of his performances in the Bonaire League and the ABC Inter-insular tournament. With Real Rincon, Cicilia was the joint top scorer of the 2017–18 Bonaire League along with Rai-Cesar Cicilia with 14 goals.

Cicilia was selected as one of Bonaire's top twelve footballers and given the opportunity to compete in a tournament in Germany in May 2018.

Real Rincon qualified for the 2018 CONCACAF Caribbean Club Shield by winning the 2017–18 Bonaire League. In the tournament, Real became the first club from Bonaire to advance to the semi-finals of a CONCACAF tournament. Real Rincon went on to win bronze in the tournament with Cicilia scoring a brace in the third place match against SV Deportivo Nacional of Aruba.

In August 2018, Cicilia went on a two-day trial with Almere City FC of the Eerste Divisie.

Cicilia competed with Real Rincon in the 2018 Kopa ABC. The new tournament pitted the league champions and runners-up of Aruba, Bonaire, and Curaçao against each other. Cicilia was good for two assist in the first game against SV Deportivo Nacional Cicilia has scored in the second game of the tournament against S.V. Vesta and he scored a brace in the tournament final victory over CRKSV Jong Holland to win the title.

From January to March 2019, Cicilia went on a trial with Sparta Rotterdam of the Eredivisie. Cicilia went on further two-day trials with Sparta Rotterdam, once in December, and then again in January.

== International career ==
Cicilia was named to Bonaire's squad for 2019–20 CONCACAF Nations League qualifying. He made his senior international debut on 9 September 2018 in the team's opening match against the Dominican Republic. He was named a starter and played the full match in an eventual 5–0 defeat.

In the 2022–23 CONCACAF Nations League, Bonaire played in League C. Cicilia was again called up for the June match window. Cicilia scored in three out of Bonaire's four matches, including a hat-trick in a 4–1 victory over British Virgin Islands. He was also instrumental in two 2–0 victories against U.S. Virgin Islands, scoring the opening goal in both games. With five goals, Cicilia led the entire Nations League in scoring halfway through the competition.

== Career statistics ==
=== Club ===
Appearances and goals by club, season and competition
Club	Season	League			Continental		Total	
Club	Season	Division	Apps	Goals	Apps	Goals	Apps	Goals
Real Rincon	2015–16	Bonaire League	26	11	—		26	11
Real Rincon	2017–18	Bonaire League	32	21	1	2	33	23
Real Rincon	2018–19	Bonaire League	5	9	—		5	9
Real Rincon	2021	Bonaire League	1	0	—		1	0
Real Rincon	2022	Bonaire League	14	16	2	1	16	17
Real Rincon	2023–24	Bonaire League	13	14	—		13	14
Real Rincon	2024–25	Bonaire League	18	19	2	1	20	20
Real Rincon	2025–26	Bonaire League	9	7	—		9	7
Real Rincon	Total	Bonaire League	118	97	5	4	123	101
Vespo	2016-17	Bonaire League	27	15			27	15
Career total			145	112	5	4	150	116

=== International ===
As of match played 5 October 2026

Appearances and goals by national team and year
National team	Year	Apps	Goals
Bonaire	2018	2	0
Bonaire	2019	2	1
Bonaire	2020	0	0
Bonaire	2021	0	0
Bonaire	2022	6	5
Bonaire	2023	2	0
Bonaire	2024	3	1
Bonaire	2025	3	1
Bonaire	2026	7	2
Total		25	10

Scores and results list Bonaire's goal tally first, score column indicates score after each Cicilia goal.

List of international goals scored by Ayrton Cicilia
No.	Date	Venue	Opponent	Score	Result	Competition
1	13 October 2019	Warner Park, Basseterre, Saint Kitts and Nevis	British Virgin Islands	1–0	4–3	2019–20 CONCACAF Nations League C
2	3 June 2022	TCIFA National Academy, Providenciales, Turks and Caicos Islands	Turks and Caicos Islands	1–0	4–1	2022–23 CONCACAF Nations League C
3	3 June 2022	TCIFA National Academy, Providenciales, Turks and Caicos Islands	Turks and Caicos Islands	2–0	4–1	2022–23 CONCACAF Nations League C
4	3 June 2022	TCIFA National Academy, Providenciales, Turks and Caicos Islands	Turks and Caicos Islands	4–0	4–1	2022–23 CONCACAF Nations League C
5	11 June 2022	Bethlehem Soccer Stadium, Upper Bethlehem, U.S. Virgin Islands	U.S. Virgin Islands	1–0	2–0	2022–23 CONCACAF Nations League C
6	14 June 2022	Stadion Rignaal 'Jean' Francisca, Willemstad, Curaçao	U.S. Virgin Islands	1–0	2–0	2022–23 CONCACAF Nations League C
7	13 October 2024	Arnos Vale Stadium, Kingstown, Saint Vincent and the Grenadines	Montserrat	1–0	1–0	2024–25 CONCACAF Nations League B
8	12 November 2025	Sir Vivian Richards Stadium, North Sound, Antigua and Barbuda	Barbados	1–3	2–3	2025–26 CONCACAF Series
9	2 October 2026	Hasely Crawford Stadium, Port of Spain, Trinidad and Tobago	Grenada	2–0	2–3	2026–27 CONCACAF Nations League B
10	5 October 2026	Hasely Crawford Stadium, Port of Spain, Trinidad and Tobago	Grenada	4–1	4–1	2026–27 CONCACAF Nations League B
