= Rowendy Sumter =

Curaçaoan footballer

Personal information
- Full name: Rowendy Wendy José Sumter
- Date of birth: 19 March 1988 (age 38)
- Place of birth: Willemstad, Netherlands Antilles
- Height: 1.91 m (6 ft 3 in)
- Position: Goalkeeper

Team information
- Current team: Scherpenheuvel
- Number: 1

Senior career*
Years	Team	Apps	(Gls)
2011–2016	Jong Holland	?	(?)
2016	Atlétiko Flamingo	?	(?)
2016–	Scherpenheuvel	?	(?)

International career^{‡}
- Curaçao U17
- Curaçao U20
- Curaçao U23
2011–	Curaçao	8	(0)
- * Club domestic league appearances and goals as of 11 October 2015 ‡ National team caps and goals as of 9 July 2017

Rowendy Wendy José Sumter (born 19 March 1988) is a Curaçaoan footballer who plays goalkeeper for RKSV Scherpenheuvel in the Sekshon Pagá and for the Curaçao national team.

== Club career ==
=== Jong Holland ===
Born in Willemstad, Netherlands Antilles, Sumter began his career with CRKSV Jong Holland in the Sekshon Pagá, the highest level of football in Curaçao. He has been the first choice goalkeeper since his first season with the club, with his performance earning him caps with the national team.

=== Atlétiko Flamingo ===
In January 2016, Sumter moved to Atlétiko Flamingo Bonaire based out of Nikiboko, Bonaire and competing in the Bonaire League, helping the club to win their first national championship for the 2015–16 season.

=== Scherpenheuvel ===
In the Summer of 2016, Sumter returned to Curaçao, joining RKSV Scherpenheuvel competing in the Curaçao League First Division once more.

== International career ==
Sumter plays for the national team of Curaçao. He made his debut on 19 August 2012 in a friendly match against the Dominican Republic, the first official match of the national team after the dissolution of the Netherlands Antilles, ending in a 1–0 loss. On 6 September 2011 he played in the 2014 FIFA World Cup qualification match against Haiti which ended in a 4–2 loss, failing to advance in the qualifiers. He was the first choice keeper for the 2012 Caribbean Cup qualification matches against Saint Lucia, Guyana and Saint Vincent and the Grenadines. He was also called up by Patrick Kluivert for the 2018 FIFA World Cup qualification, as second choice keeper behind Eloy Room.

== Career statistics ==
=== International performance ===
Statistics accurate as of matches played on 25 October 2012,

Curaçao national team
Year	Apps	Goals
2011	4	0
2012	3	0
2013	0	0
2014	0	0
Total	7	0

== Honours ==
=== Club ===
Atlétiko Flamingo

- Bonaire League (1): 2015–16

Scherpenheuvel

- Curaçao Promé Divishon (1): 2019–20

=== International ===
Curaçao

- Caribbean Cup: 2017
