= 2015–16 Bonaire League =

Bonaire League
- Season: 2015–16
- Champions: Atlétiko Flamingo
- CFU Club Championship: Atlétiko Flamingo; Real Rincon

The 2015–16 Bonaire League season or known locally as the 2015–16 Kampionato was the 47th season of the Bonaire League. The regular season began on 13 September 2015 and concluded on 30 April 2016. The Buelta di 6 began on 4 May 2016 and will end on 8 June 2016. The dates of the Beulta di 4 and the Bonaire League final have not been identified.

== Table ==
=== Regular season ===
Only a handful of matches from the regular season have been known, but it is known that Atlétiko Flamingo, Vespo, Juventus, Real Rincon, Uruguay and Vitesse all qualified for the Buelta di 6.

=== Buelta di 6 ===
Pos	Team	Pld	W	D	L	GF	GA	GD	Pts	Qualification or relegation
1	Real Rincon	5	3	1	1	9	5	+4	10	Qualification to the Buelta di 4
2	Atlétiko Flamingo	5	3	1	1	7	5	+2	10	Qualification to the Buelta di 4
3	Juventus	5	2	2	1	8	4	+4	8	Qualification to the Buelta di 4
4	Vespo	5	2	2	1	4	5	−1	8	Qualification to the Buelta di 4
5	Vitesse	5	0	3	2	3	7	−4	3	
6	Uruguay	5	0	1	4	6	11	−5	1	

Source: https://www.rsssf.org/tablesb/bonaire2015.html

=== Buelta di 4 ===
Pos	Team	Pld	W	D	L	GF	GA	GD	Pts	Qualification or relegation
1	Atlétiko Flamingo	3	2	1	0	5	2	+3	7	Qualification to the Grand Final
2	Real Rincon	3	2	0	1	7	4	+3	6	Qualification to the Grand Final
3	Juventus	3	1	1	1	3	2	+1	4	
4	Vespo	3	0	0	3	1	8	−7	0	

Source: https://www.rsssf.org/tablesb/bonaire2015.html

=== Grand Final ===
8 July 2016

Atlétiko Flamingo	4–3	Real Rincon

== See also ==
- 2015 Kopa MCB
