= Jermaine Windster =

Dutch-Bonairean footballer (born 1994)

Personal information
- Full name: Jermaine Roberto Windster
- Date of birth: 29 April 1994 (age 32)
- Place of birth: Rotterdam, Netherlands
- Height: 1.83 m (6 ft 0 in)
- Positions: Midfielder; forward

Team information
- Current team: Real Rincon
- Number: 10

College career
Years	Team	Apps	(Gls)
2013–2014	Herkimer Generals	38	(23)
2015–2016	Charleston Golden Eagles	44	(13)

Senior career*
Years	Team	Apps	(Gls)
2015	Southern West Virginia King's Warriors	2	(0)
2015–2016	AFC Ann Arbor	6	(1)
2017	SV Juventus		
2017–2018	Real Rincon		(9)
2019-2020	SV Uruguay		(16)
2021	SV Atlétiko Flamingo		(5)

International career^{‡}
2018–	Bonaire	8	(2)
- * Club domestic league appearances and goals as of 22:01, 9 September 2018 (UTC) ‡ National team caps and goals as of 22:49, 12 July 2026 (UTC)

Jermaine Windster is an international footballer who currently plays for Real Rincon of the Bonaire League, and the Bonaire national football team. He has a brother and a sister named Jianna and Jordan.

== Club career ==
=== College ===
From 2013 to 2014 Windster played college soccer in the United States for the Generals of Herkimer County Community College. Over his two seasons with the team he made 38 appearances and scored 23 goals. He was named an All-American for his division in 2014. He transferred to the University of Charleston and played for the Golden Eagles from 2015 to 2016. Over his two seasons with the club, he appeared in 44 total matches, scoring 13 goals.

=== Semi-professional ===
While attending the University of Charleston, Windster also played semi-professional football for the Southern West Virginia King's Warriors of the Premier Development League. He made two league appearances for the club during the 2015 season but failed to score a goal.

The following season, Windster signed for AFC Ann Arbor of the National Premier Soccer League. During the 2015–2016 season, he scored one goal in six league appearances.

=== Professional ===
In 2017 Windster returned to Bonaire and signed for SV Juventus of the Bonaire League. The next year he transferred to fellow-Bonaire club Real Rincon. He played with the club in the 2017 Copa ABC, including in a match against RKSV Scherpenheuvel of Curaçao. In April 2018 the club qualified for the 2018 CONCACAF Caribbean Club Shield by winning the 2017–18 Bonaire League. In the club's third match of the group stage, Windster scored a goal as Rincon drew Avenues United FC of Saint Vincent and the Grenadines 2–2 in Santiago de los Caballeros, Dominican Republic. The draw ensured that Real became the first club from Bonaire to advance to the semi-finals of a CONCACAF tournament. Real Rincon went on to win bronze in the tournament.

== International career ==
In December 2015, Windster was named to Bonaire’s provisional squad by head coach Ferdinand Bernabela in preparation for 2017 Caribbean Cup qualification. However, Bonaire ultimately did not enter the competition.

In September 2018 Windster was named to Bonaire's squad for the inaugural qualifying campaign for the newly established CONCACAF Nations League by head coach Emmanuel Alexis Cristori. He went on to make his international debut on 9 September 2018 in the team's opening match against the Dominican Republic. He was named a starter in the eventual 0–5 defeat.

== Personal life ==
Windster was born in Rotterdam in the Netherlands. He also organizes youth football clinics on Bonaire.

== Career statistics ==
=== International ===
As of match played 28 March 2023

Appearances and goals by national team and year
National team	Year	Apps	Goals
Bonaire	2018	2	0
Bonaire	2019	3	2
Bonaire	2020	0	0
Bonaire	2021	0	0
Bonaire	2022	2	0
Bonaire	2023	1	0
Total		8	2

Scores and results list Bonaire's goal tally first, score column indicates score after each Windster goal.

List of international goals scored by Jermaine Windster
No.	Date	Venue	Opponent	Score	Result	Competition
1	24 March 2019	Raymond E. Guishard Technical Centre, The Valley, Anguilla	British Virgin Islands	1–0	2–1	2019–20 CONCACAF Nations League qualifying
2	24 March 2019	Raymond E. Guishard Technical Centre, The Valley, Anguilla	British Virgin Islands	2–1	2–1	2019–20 CONCACAF Nations League qualifying
