= Rilove Janga =

Bonaire footballer and manager (born 1987)

Personal information
- Date of birth: 27 August 1987 (age 39)
- Place of birth: Kralendijk, Netherlands Antilles
- Height: 1.85 m (6 ft 1 in)
- Position: Centre-back

Team information
- Current team: Bonaire (manager)

Senior career*
Years	Team	Apps	(Gls)
2006–2007	Vespo		
2007–2008	Atlétiko Flamingo		
2009–2014	Juventus Antriol		
2015–2018	Atlétiko Flamingo		
2018–2023	Real Rincon		(4)

International career
2010	Netherlands Antilles	5	(0)
2013–2019	Bonaire	14	(1)

Managerial career
- 2023–: Bonaire
- * Club domestic league appearances and goals

Rilove Janga (born 27 August 1987) is a Bonaire professional football manager and former player who played as a centre-back. He has been the manager of the Bonaire national team since 2023.

== International career ==
=== Netherlands Antilles ===
Janga made his international debut for the Netherlands Antilles on 13 October 2010 in a 2–1 loss to Suriname. He went on to earn a total of five caps for the Netherlands Antilles before the disbandment of the Netherlands Antillean Football Union in February 2011, following the Dutch constituent country's dissolution in 2010.

=== Bonaire ===
On 14 November 2013, Janga made his debut for Bonaire in a 2–0 friendly loss to Suriname.

== Managerial career ==
In 2023, Janga was appointed the new manager of the Bonaire national team.

== Career statistics ==
=== International goals ===
Scores and results list Bonaire's goal tally first.

No.	Date	Venue	Cap	Opponent	Score	Result	Competition
1.	13 October 2019	Warner Park, Basseterre, Saint Kitts and Nevis	14	British Virgin Islands	2–3	4–3	2019–20 CONCACAF Nations League C
