= Josh Gross =

Dutch-Aruban footballer (born 1993)

Joshua Gross
Personal information
- Full name: Joshua Emilio Gross Santana
- Date of birth: 15 May 1993 (age 33)
- Place of birth: Rotterdam, Netherlands
- Height: 1.77 m (5 ft 10 in)
- Position: Midfielder

Team information
- Current team: Dakota
- Number: 17

Youth career
- Dakota

Senior career*
Years	Team	Apps	(Gls)
2013–2017	SHO	28	(6)
2017–2018	Spartaan '20	8	(0)
2018–2019	ASWH	5	(0)
2019–2020	Dakota	14	(9)
2020–2021	Asarums IF	16	(5)
2021–	Dakota	46	(15)

International career^{‡}
2018–	Aruba	13	(2)
- * Club domestic league appearances and goals ‡ National team caps and goals as of 21:31, 4 January 2023 (UTC)

Joshua Emilio Gross Santana (born 13 May 1993), known as Joshua, or simply Josh, is an Aruban footballer who plays as a midfielder for Aruban Division di Honor club Dakota and the Aruba national football team.

== Career ==
=== Club career ===
Josh started his career with SHO. He joined Dakota in 2019 where he helped the club to win Aruban Division di Honor in 2021–22. He played with Dakota in the 2023, CONCACAF Caribbean Shield.

== International career ==
Gross debuted on 9 September 2018 in a match against Bermuda in a 3–1 victory in the qualifying rounds of the CONCACAF Nations League.

On 22 March 2019, Gross scored his first goal, but suffered a 3–2 defeat against St. Lucia.

== Honours ==
Dakota

- Aruban Division di Honor: 2021–22
- Torneo Copa Betico Croes: 2018–19
