= Kopa MCB =

- Founded: 2012
- Region: Bonaire (FFB)
- Current champions: Real Rincon (4th title)
- Most championships: Real Rincon (4th title)

Kopa MCB is an annual football domestic cup competition for teams on Bonaire. Until 2010 when the Netherlands Antilles was dissolved, teams from Bonaire competed against teams from Curaçao in the Netherlands Antilles Championship (Kopa Antiano). After gaining new politic status, no competition was held on Bonaire in 2011. The inaugural Kopa MCB was held in 2012. The competition is organized by the Bonaire Football Federation with naming rights purchased by Maduro & Curiel's Bank.

== Champions ==
Key
*	Match decided in extra time
^{†}	Match decided by a penalty shootout

Season	Winner	Score	Runners–up	Ref.
2012	Real Rincon	2–0	SV Juventus	
2013	Real Rincon	1–1^{†}	S.V. Uruguay	
2014	Real Rincon	3–1	S.V. Uruguay	
2015	Real Rincon	5–3	S.V. Uruguay	

== Results by club ==
Club	Wins
Real Rincon	4
