= St. Louis Bertrand Church (Bonaire) =

- Parokia San Luis Beltran
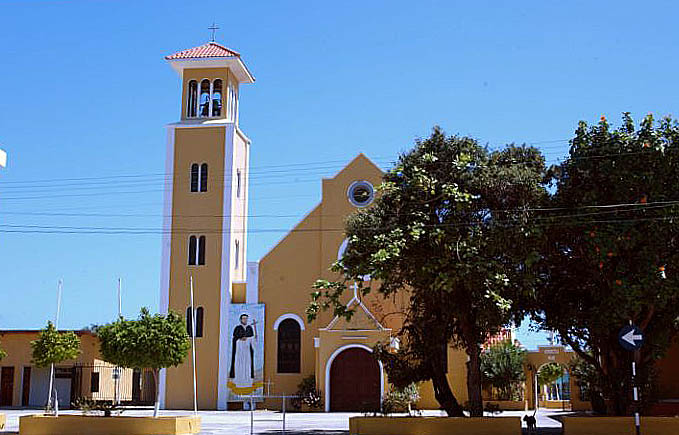
- St. Louis Bertrand Church
- 12.2384°N 68.3304°W
- Location: Rincon, Bonaire
- Country: Netherlands
- Denomination: Roman Catholic Church

The St. Louis Bertrand Church (Papiamento: Parokia San Luis Beltran; Dutch: Sint-Ludovicus Bertranduskerk) is a religious building affiliated with the Catholic Church and is located in the town of Rincon on the Caribbean island of Bonaire, organized within the Dutch Caribbean as a special municipality of the Kingdom of the Netherlands.

The church follows the Roman or Latin rite and depends on the Diocese of Willemstad (Dioecesis Gulielmopolitana) based in the nearby city of Willemstad on the island of Curacao also. It was dedicated in honor of San Luis Bertran i Eixarch O.P. (Also written Sant Lluís Bertran) a Spanish saint of the Dominican order, canonized by Pope Clement X in 1691. It is decorated with yellow and white and has an image of St. Louis next to the main entrance and one side of his bell tower.

== See also ==
- Roman Catholicism in the Caribbean part of the Kingdom of the Netherlands
- Roman Catholic Diocese of Willemstad
- Louis Bertrand (saint)
- A.J. van Koolwijk
