= Public holidays in Bonaire =

This is a list of public holidays in Bonaire.

| Date | Name in English | Name in Dutch | Remarks |
|---|---|---|---|
| January 1 | New Year's Day | Nieuwjaarsdag | |
| February 12 | Carnival Holiday | Karnaval | |
| movable holiday | Good Friday | Goede Vrijdag | |
| movable holiday | Easter Sunday | Pasen | |
| movable holiday | Easter Monday | Paasmaandag | |
| April 27 | King's Birthday | Koningsdag | |
| April 30 | Rincon Day | Rincon Dag | Dia di Rincon in Papiamento. It is a local harvest festival. |
| May 1 | Labor Day | Dag van de Arbeid | |
| movable holiday | Ascension Day | Hemelvaartsdag | |
| movable holiday | Whit Sunday | Pinksteren | |
| September 6 | Bonaire Flag Day | Vlagdag bonaire | |
| December 25 | Christmas Day | Kerstmis | |
| December 26 | Second Day of Christmas | | |
