= CFU Club Shield =

Caribbean football competition

- Organiser(s): CFU; CONCACAF (2018–2023)
- Founded: 2018; 8 years ago
- Region: Caribbean
- Teams: 20
- Qualifier for: CONCACAF Caribbean Cup
- Current champions: (Jamaica) Mount Pleasant (1st title)
- Most championships: (Suriname) Robinhood (2 titles)
- Broadcaster: CFU (YouTube)

The CFU Club Shield, also known as the CFU Caribbean Club Shield and formerly as the CONCACAF Caribbean Club Shield, is an annual Caribbean football competition for clubs that are members of the Caribbean Football Union (CFU). It is a second-tier competition to the CONCACAF Caribbean Cup (and formerly the Caribbean Club Championship), introduced in 2018 for clubs which worked towards professional standards. It is organized by the CFU, with CONCACAF organizing it between 2018 and 2023.

Until 2022, the winner of this competition, as long as it fulfilled the licensing criteria, played against the fourth-placed team of the Caribbean Club Championship for a place in the CONCACAF League. Starting with 2023, the winner and runner-up qualify for the CONCACAF Caribbean Cup.

== History ==
On 25 July 2017 in San Francisco, California, the CONCACAF Council approved the implementation of a two-tier competition for affiliated clubs of Caribbean member associations, starting in 2018. The tier-one competition, known as the Caribbean Club Championship, would be contested by the champions and runners-up of the top professional and semi-professional leagues in year one, and open to only fully professional leagues in year two onwards. The tier-two competition, known as the Caribbean Club Shield, would be contested by the champions of the leagues that had no professional teams in year one (2018), opened to semi-professional standards in year two (2019) and planned to be open to fully professional leagues by 2022.

In 2023, both tournaments were restructured and renamed. The winner and runner-up of the second-tier Caribbean Shield now qualify for the first-tier CONCACAF Caribbean Cup to be held later in the same month.

On 30 April 2024, CONCACAF officially gave the responsibility to organize the Caribbean Club Shield to the Caribbean Football Union, and as such the name of the competition was changed to the CFU Club Shield.

== Results ==
Season	Hosts	Winners	Score	Runners-up	Third place	Score	Fourth place
2018	Dominican Republic	(Martinique) Club Franciscain	2–1	(Suriname) Inter Moengotapoe	(Bonaire) Real Rincon	3–1	(Aruba) Nacional
2019	Curaçao	(Suriname) Robinhood	1–0	(Martinique) Club Franciscain	(Barbados) Weymouth Wales and (Curaçao) Jong Holland		
2020	Curaçao	Cancelled due to COVID-19 pandemic					
2021	Curaçao	Cancelled due to COVID-19 pandemic					
2022	Puerto Rico	(Puerto Rico) Bayamón FC	2–1 (a.e.t.)	(Suriname) Inter Moengotapoe	(Guadeloupe) AS Gosier	2–0	(Curaçao) Jong Holland
2023	Saint Kitts and Nevis	(Suriname) Robinhood	5–1	(Martinique) Golden Lion	(Trinidad and Tobago) Club Sando	6–1	(Puerto Rico) Metropolitan
2024	Curaçao	(Jamaica) Arnett Gardens	1–0	(Antigua and Barbuda) Grenades	(Dominican Republic) Atlético Pantoja	1–1 (9–8 p)	(Dominica) Dublanc
2025	Trinidad and Tobago	(Dominican Republic) Moca	3–2	(Barbados) Weymouth Wales	(Martinique) Club Franciscain	2–0	(Turks and Caicos Islands) Academy Eagles
2026	Trinidad and Tobago	(Jamaica) Mount Pleasant	1–0	(Dominican Republic) Delfines del Este	(Suriname) Robinhood and (Puerto Rico) Metropolitan		

== Summary ==
=== Performance by club ===
Team	Winners	Runners-up	Third place	Fourth place	Semi-finalist	Top 4 total
(Suriname) Robinhood	2 (2019, 2023)	—N/a	—N/a	—N/a	1 (2026)	3
(Martinique) Club Franciscain	1 (2018)	1 (2019)	1 (2025)	—N/a	—N/a	3
(Puerto Rico) Bayamón FC	1 (2022)	—N/a	—N/a	—N/a	—N/a	1
(Jamaica) Arnett Gardens	1 (2024)	—N/a	—N/a	—N/a	—N/a	1
(Dominican Republic) Moca	1 (2025)	—N/a	—N/a	—N/a	—N/a	1
(Jamaica) Mount Pleasant	1 (2026)	—N/a	—N/a	—N/a	—N/a	1
(Suriname) Inter Moengotapoe	—N/a	2 (2018, 2022)	—N/a	—N/a	—N/a	2
(Barbados) Weymouth Wales	—N/a	1 (2025)	—N/a	—N/a	1 (2019)	2
(Martinique) Golden Lion	—N/a	1 (2023)	—N/a	—N/a	—N/a	1
(Antigua and Barbuda) Grenades	—N/a	1 (2024)	—N/a	—N/a	—N/a	1
(Dominican Republic) Delfines del Este	—N/a	1 (2026)	—N/a	—N/a	—N/a	1
(Bonaire) Real Rincon	—N/a	—N/a	1 (2018)	—N/a	—N/a	1
(Guadeloupe) AS Gosier	—N/a	—N/a	1 (2022)	—N/a	—N/a	1
(Trinidad and Tobago) Club Sando	—N/a	—N/a	1 (2023)	—N/a	—N/a	1
(Dominican Republic) Atlético Pantoja	—N/a	—N/a	1 (2024)	—N/a	—N/a	1
(Curaçao) Jong Holland	—N/a	—N/a	—N/a	1 (2022)	1 (2019)	2
(Puerto Rico) Metropolitan	—N/a	—N/a	—N/a	1 (2023)	1 (2026)	2
(Aruba) Nacional	—N/a	—N/a	—N/a	1 (2018)	—N/a	1
(Dominica) Dublanc	—N/a	—N/a	—N/a	1 (2024)	—N/a	1
(Turks and Caicos Islands) Academy Eagles	—N/a	—N/a	—N/a	1 (2025)	—N/a	1

=== Performance by association ===
Legend

- 1st – Champions
- 2nd – Runners-up
- 3rd – Third place
- 4th – Fourth place
- SF – Semi-finals
- QF – Quarter-finals
- R16 – Round of 16
- PR – First round
- PR – Preliminary round
- GS – Group stage
- Q – Qualified
- — Hosts
- x – Entered, but tournament not held
- – – Did not enter
- –– – Withdrew before tournament

Team	2018 (Dominican Republic)	2019 (Curaçao)	2020 (Curaçao)	2021 (Curaçao)	2022 (Puerto Rico)	2023 (Saint Kitts and Nevis)	2024 (Curaçao)	2025 (Trinidad and Tobago)	2026 (Trinidad and Tobago)	Total
Anguilla	–	–	–	–	–	–	–	GS	FR	2
Antigua and Barbuda	–	QF	x	–	–	–	2nd	GS	––	3
Aruba	4th	GS	x	x	GS	GS	R16	GS	R16	7
Barbados	GS	SF	x	–	–	–	–	2nd	QF	4
Bonaire	3rd	GS	x	x	GS	–	R16	GS	–	5
British Virgin Islands	–	–	x	–	–	–	–	GS	FR	2
Cayman Islands	GS	GS	x	–	–	GS	R16	GS	R16	6
Cuba	–	QF	x	–	–	–	–	–	–	1
Curaçao	GS	SF	x	x	4th	GS	QF	–	QF	6
Dominica	–	–	x	x	GS	GS	4th	GS	FR	5
Dominican Republic	–	–	–	–	–	GS	3rd	1st	2nd	4
French Guiana	–	–	–	x	–	GS	R16	GS	–	3
Grenada	GS	–	–	–	–	–	PR	GS	R16	4
Guadeloupe	GS	QF	x	x	3rd	GS	–	–	–	4
Guyana	––	GS	–	x	–	–	PR	GS	QF	4
Haiti	–	–	–	–	–	–	––	––	––	0
Jamaica	–	–	–	–	–	––	1st	GS	1st	3
Martinique	1st	2nd	x	x	GS	2nd	–	3rd	–	5
Puerto Rico	–	–	x	x	1st	4th	QF	GS	SF	5
Saint Kitts and Nevis	GS	QF	–	x	–	GS	QF	GS	FR	6
Saint Lucia	–	GS	x	x	–	GS	R16	GS	R16	5
Saint Martin	–	–	–	–	–	–	PR	–	–	1
Saint Vincent and the Grenadines	GS	–	x	x	–	–	–	–	R16	2
Sint Maarten	–	–	–	x	GS	GS	PR	GS	FR	5
Suriname	2nd	1st	x	x	2nd	1st	QF	GS	SF	7
Trinidad and Tobago	–	–	–	–	–	3rd	R16	GS	R16	4
Turks and Caicos Islands	–	–	–	–	GS	GS	R16	4th	FR	5
U.S. Virgin Islands	–	–	–	–	–	–	–	GS	QF	2
Total	12	13	0 (15)	0 (14)	10	16	20	24	22	

Team	Winners	Runners-up	Third place	Fourth place	Semi-finalist	Top 4 total
Suriname	2 (2019, 2023)	2 (2018, 2022)	—N/a	—N/a	1 (2026)	5
Jamaica	2 (2024, 2026)	—N/a	—N/a	—N/a	—N/a	2
Martinique	1 (2018)	2 (2019, 2023)	1 (2025)	—N/a	—N/a	4
Dominican Republic	1 (2025)	1 (2026)	1 (2024)	—N/a	—N/a	3
Puerto Rico	1 (2022)	—N/a	—N/a	1 (2023)	1 (2026)	3
Barbados	—N/a	1 (2025)	—N/a	—N/a	1 (2019)	2
Antigua and Barbuda	—N/a	1 (2024)	—N/a	—N/a	—N/a	1
Bonaire	—N/a	—N/a	1 (2018)	—N/a	—N/a	1
Guadeloupe	—N/a	—N/a	1 (2022)	—N/a	—N/a	1
Trinidad and Tobago	—N/a	—N/a	1 (2023)	—N/a	—N/a	1
Curaçao	—N/a	—N/a	—N/a	1 (2022)	1 (2019)	2
Aruba	—N/a	—N/a	—N/a	1 (2018)	—N/a	1
Dominica	—N/a	—N/a	—N/a	1 (2024)	—N/a	1
Turks and Caicos Islands	—N/a	—N/a	—N/a	1 (2025)	—N/a	1

== See also ==
- Leagues Cup
- CONCACAF Central American Cup
- CONCACAF Champions Cup
