= Yann Thimon =

French footballer (born 1990)

Personal information
- Full name: Yann Grégory Thimon
- Date of birth: January 1, 1990 (age 36)
- Place of birth: Saint-Pierre, Martinique
- Height: 1.86 m (6 ft 1 in)
- Position: Forward

Team information
- Current team: Club Franciscain

Senior career*
Years	Team	Apps	(Gls)
–2015	Club Franciscain		
2015–2017	Golden Lion		
2017–	Club Franciscain		

International career
2017–	Martinique	5	(1)
- * Club domestic league appearances and goals

Yann Thimon (born 1 January 1990 in Martinique) is a professional footballer who plays as a forward for Club Franciscain and internationally for Martinique.

Thimon began his career with Club Franciscain, moving to Golden Lion in 2015. He returned to Club Franciscain in 2017.

He made his debut for Martinique in 2017. He was in the Martinique Gold Cup squad for the 2017 tournament.

Outside of football, Thimon works as an estate agent.

== Personal life ==
Yann is the brother of the Yordan Thimon, who is also an Martinique international footballer.
