= Djénhael Maingé =

French association football player (born 1992)

Personal information
- Full name: Djénhael Maingé
- Date of birth: February 18, 1992 (age 34)
- Place of birth: Martinique
- Position: Forward

Team information
- Current team: Club Franciscain

Senior career*
| Years | Team | Apps | (Gls) |
| 2011– | Club Franciscain | | |

International career
| 2012– | Martinique | | |
- * Club domestic league appearances and goals as of 23 June 2016

Djénhael Maingé (born 18 February 1992) is a professional footballer who plays as a forward for Club Franciscain in the Martinique Championnat National and internationally for Martinique.

He made his debut for Martinique in 2012. He was in the Martinique Gold Cup squad for the 2017 tournament.

In January 2015, Maingé spent 2 weeks on trial with SCO Angers. This was not successful, but he remained in France to play for Club Franciscain in the Coupe de France match against Nantes. In May 2018, Maingé scored for Club Franciscain as the Martinique side beat Central FC 2-1 to qualify for the 2018 CONCACAF League.
