= RKSV Spartaan'20 =

Dutch football club

- Full name: Rooms Katholieke Sport Vereniging Spartaan 1920
- Founded: August 14, 1920; 106 years ago
- Ground: Zuiderpark, Rotterdam
- Capacity: 1,500
- League: Eerste Klasse C
- Website: https://www.spartaan20.nl/

RKSV Spartaan'20 is a Dutch amateur football club from the city of Rotterdam founded in 1920. The club's first team competes in the Eerste Klasse C, the sixth tier of football in the Netherlands. The club's home ground is the 1,500-seat Zuiderpark.

== History ==
The club was founded on 14 August 1920 by former Feyenoord player Nico Kempen for Catholic youth in the Afrikaanderwijk, Katendrecht, Bloemhof and Hillesluis districts of Rotterdam. In 1940, the club added the KNVB and '20 to its name to prevent confusion with De Spartaan from Amsterdam.

The club is known for its youth player development. In 2012, Spartaan'20 won the Reiger Boys International Youth Tournament which also featured Celtic, Zenit Saint Petersburg, Bristol City, Beerschot AC, KV Mechelen, Borussia Mönchengladbach, and Spartak Trnana.
