= Municipal Stadium (Kralendijk) =

Coordinates: 12°09′0.22″N 68°16′26.86″W

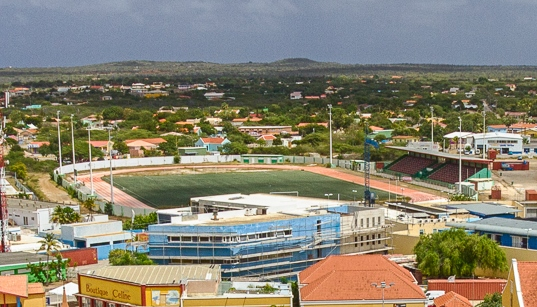
- Kralendijk Stadium After Renovations (March 2014)
- Interactive map of Municipal Stadium
- Location: Kralendijk, Bonaire
- Capacity: 3,000

Tenant
- Bonaire national football team

Municipal Stadium is a multi-use stadium in Kralendijk, on the island of Bonaire. It is currently used mostly for football matches. The stadium holds 3,000 people.

== Gallery ==
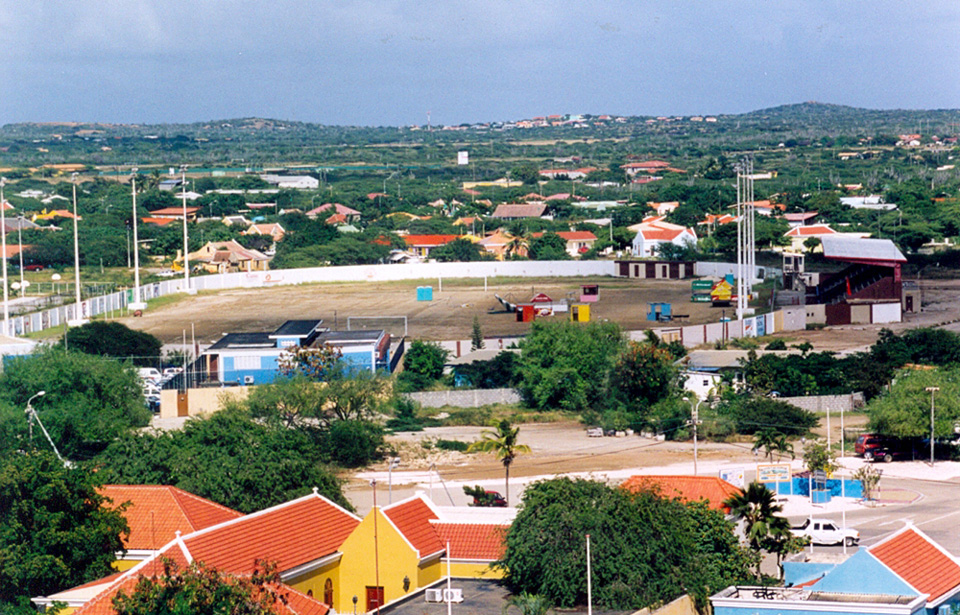
Stadium Prior to Renovations
