= Ferdinand Bernabela =

Bonaire football manager

Personal information
- Place of birth: Netherlands Antilles

Managerial career
- Years: Team
- 2014–2015: Bonaire

Ferdinand Bernabela is a Bonaire professional football manager. From 2014 to 2015 he coached the Bonaire national football team.

== Managerial statistics ==
As of 27 November 2014

Team	From	To	Record				
Team	From	To	G	W	D	L	Win %
Bonaire	14 May 2014	Present	5	2	1	2	40.00
