= Bonaire League =

Liga FFB
- Founded: 31 May 1960; 66 years ago
- Country: Bonaire
- Confederation: CONCACAF
- Number of clubs: 11
- Level on pyramid: 1
- International cup: CFU Club Shield
- Current champions: SV Vespo
- Most championships: Real Rincon (17 titles)
- Top scorer: (Bonaire) Ayrton Cicilia (112 goals)
- Current: 2025–26 Bonaire League

Divishon Honor – Bonaire or known as Liga FFB and Kampionato (literally [the football] championship ) is the top association football league in Bonaire, a special municipality of the Netherlands in the Caribbean. The top two clubs competed in the Netherlands Antilles Championship until the dissolution of the Netherlands Antilles in 2010.

== Current clubs ==
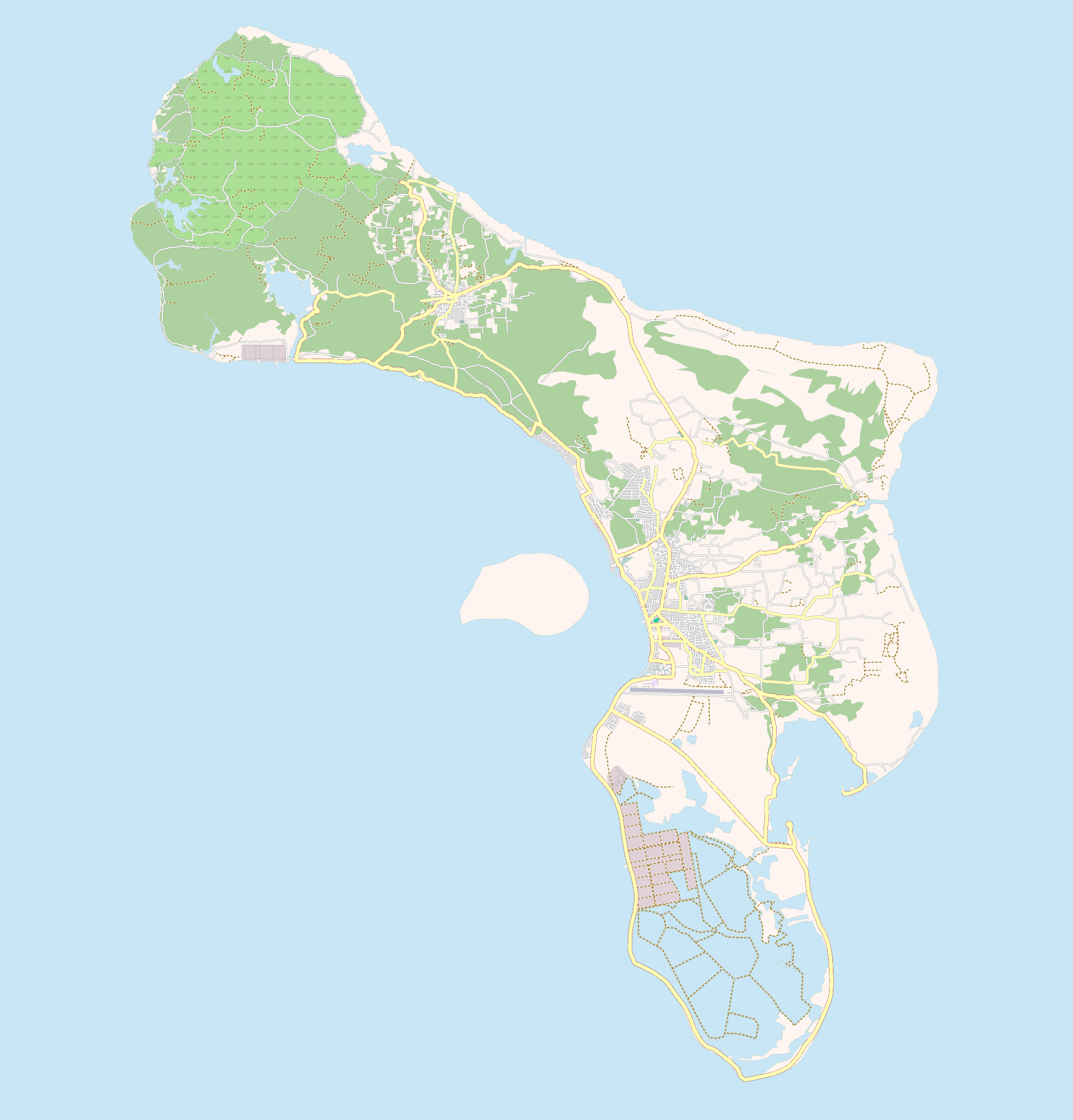
Location of teams in the 2025 Liga FFB

There are currently 11 clubs in the Bonaire League:

- Arriba Perú (Playa, Kralendijk)
- Atlétiko Flamingo (Nikiboko, Kralendijk)
- Atlétiko Tera Corá (a.k.a. ATC), (Tera Kòra, Kralendijk)
- Independiente Bonaire (Nikibobo, Kralendijk)
- SV Real Rincon (Rincon)
- SV Estrellas (Nort'i Saliña, Kralendijk)
- SV Juventus (Antriòl, Kralendijk)
- SV Uruguay (Antriòl, Kralendijk)
- SV Vespo (Rincon)
- SV Vitesse (Antriòl, Kralendijk)
- SV Young Boys (Nort'i Saliña, Kralendijk)

== Competition format ==
The league operates on a promotion and relegation system with multiple divisions. The exact format has varied over the years, but it currently involves: Regular Season: All participating teams compete in a league format, playing each other once (which means all teams play 10 matches).

The Kaya 6 Stage: The top six teams from the regular season enter this phase, playing in a single round-robin format.

Final Stage - Kaya 4: The top four teams from the Kaya 6 Stage compete in another round-robin phase. The two best teams from this stage advance to the final match to determine the league champion.

The league typically starts in the fall, with the final match played in the summer of the following year.

== Champions ==
Previous winners are:

Season	Champion
1960–61	SV Deportivo
1961–62	SV Estrellas
1962–63	SV Estrellas
1963–64	SV Estrellas
1964–65	not held
1965–66	SV Estrellas
1966–67	not held
1967–68	SV Vitesse
1968–69	SV Vitesse
1969–70	SV Vitesse
1970–71	SV Vitesse
1971–72	SV Real Rincon
1973	SV Real Rincon
1973-74	not held
1974-75	SV Estrellas
1976	SV Juventus
1977	SV Juventus
1978	SV Estrellas
1979	SV Real Rincon
1980-81	SV Vitesse
1982	not held
1983	SV Uruguay
1984	SV Juventus
1984-85	SV Juventus
1986	SV Real Rincon
1987	SV Juventus
1988	SV Estrellas
1989	SV Juventus
1990–91	SV Vitesse
1991–92	SV Juventus
1992–93	SV Vitesse
1993–94	SV Juventus
1994–95	SV Vespo
1996	Real Rincon
1997	Real Rincon
1998–99	SV Estrellas
1999–00	SV Estrellas
2000–01	SV Estrellas
2001–02	SV Estrellas
2002–03	Real Rincon
2003–04	Real Rincon
2004–05	SV Juventus
2005–06	Real Rincon
2006–07	SV Vespo
2007–08	SV Juventus
2009	SV Juventus
2010	SV Juventus
2011	not held
2012	SV Juventus
2013	SV Juventus
2014	Real Rincon
2015–16	Atlétiko Flamingo
2016–17	Real Rincon
2017–18	Real Rincon
2018–19	Real Rincon
2019–20	season abandoned after round 11
2021	Real Rincon
2022	Real Rincon
2023–24	Real Rincon
2024–25	Real Rincon
2025–26	SV Vespo

== Top winners ==
Italic indicates former clubs.

Club	Title	Winning years
Real Rincon	17	1971–72, 1973, 1979, 1986, 1996, 1997, 2002–03, 2003–04, 2005–06, 2014, 2016–17, 2017–18, 2018–19, 2021, 2022, 2023–24, 2024–25
SV Juventus	14	1976, 1977, 1984, 1984–85, 1987, 1989, 1992, 1994, 2004–05, 2007–08, 2009, 2010, 2012, 2013
SV Estrellas	11	1961–62, 1962–63, 1963–64, 1965–66, 1974–75, 1978, 1988, 1998–99, 1999–00, 2000–01, 2001–02
SV Vitesse	7	1967–68, 1968–69, 1969–70, 1970–71, 1980–81, 1990–91, 1993
SV Vespo	3	1994–95, 2006–07, 2025–26
Atlétiko Flamingo	1	2015–16
SV Deportivo	1	1960–61
SV Uruguay	1	1983

== Top goalscorers ==
Season	Goalscorer	Club	Goals
2017-18	(Bonaire) Ayrton Cicilia	Real Rincon	21
2019-20	(Bonaire) Jermaine Windster	Uruguay	16
2021	(Colombia) Jhojan Palacios	Vitesse	18
2022	(Bonaire) Christopher Isenia	Vespo	18
2023-24	(Bonaire) Felix Verhaar	Real Rincon	22
2024-25	(Bonaire) Fabio Hierck	Real Rincon	29
2025-26	(Bonaire) Christopher Isenia	Vitesse	8

Most goals scored by a player in a single season

- 29 goals.
  - Fabio Hierck (2024-25)

Most goals scored by a player in a single game

- 7 goals.
  - Christopher Isenia (Vespo) 1-15 against Juventus, 9 July 2022

=== Top assists ===
Season	Player	Team	Assists
2024-25	(Bonaire) Fabio Hierck	Real Rincon	15

== Multiple hat-tricks ==
Rank	Country	Player	Hat-tricks
1	(Bonaire)	Christopher Isenia	5
2	(Bonaire)	Ayrton Cicilia	4
3	(Bonaire)	Jerson Agostein	2
3	(Bonaire)	Fabio Hierck	2
3	(Bonaire)	Yurick Seinpaal	2
3	(Bonaire)	Felix Verhaar	2
6	(Bonaire)	G Anthony	1
6	(Bonaire)	Kevin Cijntje	1
6	(Bonaire)	Richnaldo Cijntje	1
6	(Bonaire)	Gideon Emers	1
6	(Bonaire)	Jurven Koffi	1
6	(Bonaire)	Jonathan Libania	1
6	(Bonaire)	Denzel Marchena	1
6	(Bonaire)	Brigamsley Martha	1
6	(Bonaire)	Edshel Martha	1
6	(Bonaire)	G Martis	1
6	(Bonaire)	Mayron Serberce	1
6	(Bonaire)	Leroy Van Dongen	1
6	(Bonaire)	Jermaine Windster	1
