= Stadion Antonio Trenidat =

Football stadium in Rincon, Bonaire

- Interactive map of Stadion Antonio Trenidat
- Location: Rincon, Bonaire
- Coordinates: 12.2411°N 68.3459°W
- Capacity: 1,500
- Surface: Artificial turf

Tenants
- SV Real Rincon; Bonaire national football team SV Young Boys; SV Vespo

Stadion Antonio Trenidat is an association football stadium in Rincon, on the island of Bonaire. The stadium holds 1,500 people.

== History ==
Following renovations to bring it up to FIFA international standards, the stadium hosted the first-ever official match of the Bonaire national football team on home soil on 28 March 2023. The eventual 1–2 defeat to the Turks and Caicos closed out Bonaire's 2022–23 CONCACAF Nations League C campaign.
