= SV Atlétiko Tera Corá =

S.V. Atlétiko Tera Corá
- Full name: Sporting Vereniging Atlétiko Tera Corá
- Nickname(s): Titans
- Founded: 1977
- Ground: Municipal Stadium; Kralendijk, Bonaire
- Capacity: 3,000
- League: Bonaire League
Home colours	Away colours

Sport Vereniging Atlétiko Tera Corá, or ATC is a Bonaire professional association football club based in Kralendijk. The club competes in the BFF Bonaire League, the top tier of football in Bonaire.
