= SV Atlétiko Flamingo =

Atlétiko Flamingo
- Full name: Sport Vereniging Atlétiko Flamingo Bonaire
- Founded: 2008
- Ground: Stadion Antonio Trenidat; Rincon
- Capacity: 1,500
- League: Bonaire League

SV Atlétiko Flamingo Bonaire is a professional football club from Nikiboko in Bonaire in the Caribbean Netherlands, playing at the top level.

== History ==
The club was founded in 2008, and have been competing at the top flight since the 2015 season. They play their home games at the Stadion Antonio Trenidat, in nearby Rincon, Bonaire to a capacity of 1,500 people.

== Squad (2022) ==
Note: Flags indicate national team as defined under FIFA eligibility rules; some limited exceptions apply. Players may hold more than one non-FIFA nationality.

No.	Pos.	Nation	Player
—	GK	CUW	Rugenio Josephia
—	GK	BOE	Marnick Cicilia
—	DF	BOE	Matias Juarretche
—	DF	BOE	Ruvelio Josephia
—	DF	BOE	Terrance Trinidad
—	DF	BOE	Jonathan Emerenciana
—	MF	BOE	Berjantico Emerenciana
—	MF	BOE	Giandro Steba
—	MF	BOE	Reuben Vlijt

No.	Pos.	Nation	Player
—	MF	BOE	Jurven Koffy
—	MF	BOE	Yannick Bekman
—	MF	BOE	Rogyaer Anita
—	MF	BOE	Jonathan Libiana
—	MF	BOE	Yurick Seinpaal
—	MF	BOE	Jermaine Windster
—	FW	BOE	Giovanie Makaai
—	FW	BOE	Richajier Oleana

== Honours ==
- Bonaire League

2015–16
