= SV Real Rincon =

- Full name: Sportvereniging Real Rincon
- Nickname: Real
- Founded: 1957
- Ground: Stadion Antonio Trenidat, Rincon, Bonaire
- Capacity: 1,500
- Manager: Danielo Trenidat
- League: Bonaire League
Home colours	Away colours

SV Real Rincon is a professional football club from the town of Rincon in Bonaire, Caribbean Netherlands. The team has won the Bonaire League on 11 occasions, most recently in 2018–19, as well as twice finishing top of the unofficial transitional championships.

== Current squad ==
2022 Caribbean Club Shield Note: Flags indicate national team as defined under FIFA eligibility rules; some limited exceptions apply. Players may hold more than one non-FIFA nationality.

No.	Pos.	Nation	Player
-	GK	BOE	Jonas Lafeber
22	GK	BOE	Sifmar Sint Jago
28	GK	BOE	Rishison Frans
-	DF	BOE	Shurendley Theodora
-	DF	BOE	Robertson Angela
2	DF	BOE	Leomar Janga
3	DF	BOE	Rutger Thode
14	DF	BOE	Jamrick Sint Jago
20	DF	BOE	Amir Winklaar
5	DF	BOE	Igmard Gijsbertha
15	DF	BOE	Rilove Janga
-	DF	BOE	Ilfred Piar
-	MF	BOE	Raymiro Coffie
-	MF	BOE	André Piar
-	MF	BOE	Benito Coffie
-	MF	BOE	Raemian Janga
-	MF	BOE	Rogen Pinedo
—	MF	BOE	Angenor Beaumont
9	MF	BOE	Xemion Celestijn

No.	Pos.	Nation	Player
12	MF	CUW	Sjundrikson Luisa
-	MF	BOE	Robert Frans
-	MF	BOE	Edshel Martha
-	MF	BOE	Marnix Eustachia
27	MF	BOE	Lacey Pauletta
-	FW	BOE	Terrence Frans
-	FW	BOE	Sergio Mercera
-	FW	BOE	Deebro Trinidad
7	FW	NED	Isha Hughan
8	FW	BOE	Isha Hughan
16	FW	BOE	Anfernee Frans
19	FW	BOE	Freadyen Michiel
21	FW	BOE	Fabio Hierck
26	FW	BOE	Justin Michel
10	FW	BOE	Ayrton Cicilia

== Achievements ==
- Bonaire League

Winners: 1971–72, 1973, 1979, 1986, 1996, 1997, 2003–04, 2014, 2016–17, 2017–18, 2018–19, 2021, 2022, 2023–24
Winners (transitional championship): 2002–03, 2005–06
Runners-up: 1968–69, 1974–75, 1976, 1977, 1978, 1980–81, 1984, 1990–91, 2001–02, 2006–07, 2007–08, 2009, 2010, 2013
Runners-up (transitional championship): 2000–01, 2015–2016

- Kopa MCB

Winners: 2012, 2013, 2014, 2015

- CONCACAF Caribbean Club Shield

3rd: 2018

- Kopa ABC

Winners: 2018

== International competition ==
Real Rincon competed in Concacaf international club competition for the first time in 2018 during the inaugural edition of the Caribbean Club Shield. In the tournament Rincon placed third, winning the bronze, after topping its group in the first stage and defeating SV Deportivo Nacional of Aruba in the third-place match.

Results list Real Rincon's goal tally first.

Competition	Round	Club	Score
2018 CONCACAF Caribbean Club Shield	Group Stage	(Grenada) Hard Rock	3–1
2018 CONCACAF Caribbean Club Shield	Group Stage	(Saint Vincent and the Grenadines) Avenues United	2–2
2018 CONCACAF Caribbean Club Shield	Semi-final	(Martinique) Club Franciscain	0–2
2018 CONCACAF Caribbean Club Shield	Third Place Match	(Aruba) Nacional	3–1
2019 CONCACAF Caribbean Club Shield	Group Stage	(Guadeloupe) Moulien	0–1
2019 CONCACAF Caribbean Club Shield	Group Stage	(Barbados) Weymouth Wales	0–1
2020 CONCACAF Caribbean Club Shield	Group Stage	(Saint Vincent and the Grenadines) Pastures	Cancelled
2020 CONCACAF Caribbean Club Shield	Group Stage	(Saint Lucia) Platinum	Cancelled
2021 Caribbean Club Shield	Group Stage	(Sint Maarten) Flames United	Cancelled
2021 Caribbean Club Shield	Group Stage	(Curaçao) Scherpenheuvel	Cancelled
2021 Caribbean Club Shield	Group Stage	(Saint Lucia) Platinum	Cancelled
2021 Caribbean Club Championship	Group Stage	(Puerto Rico) Metropolitan FA	0–4
2021 Caribbean Club Championship	Group Stage	(Dominican Republic) Delfines del Este	0–10
2024 CFU Club Shield	Round of 16	(Antigua and Barbuda) Grenades	1–2
2025 CFU Club Shield	Group Stage	(Saint Lucia) Le Clery	1–1
2025 CFU Club Shield	Group Stage	(Puerto Rico) Academia Quintana	0–3
