= Rincon, Bonaire =

Rincon
- Town
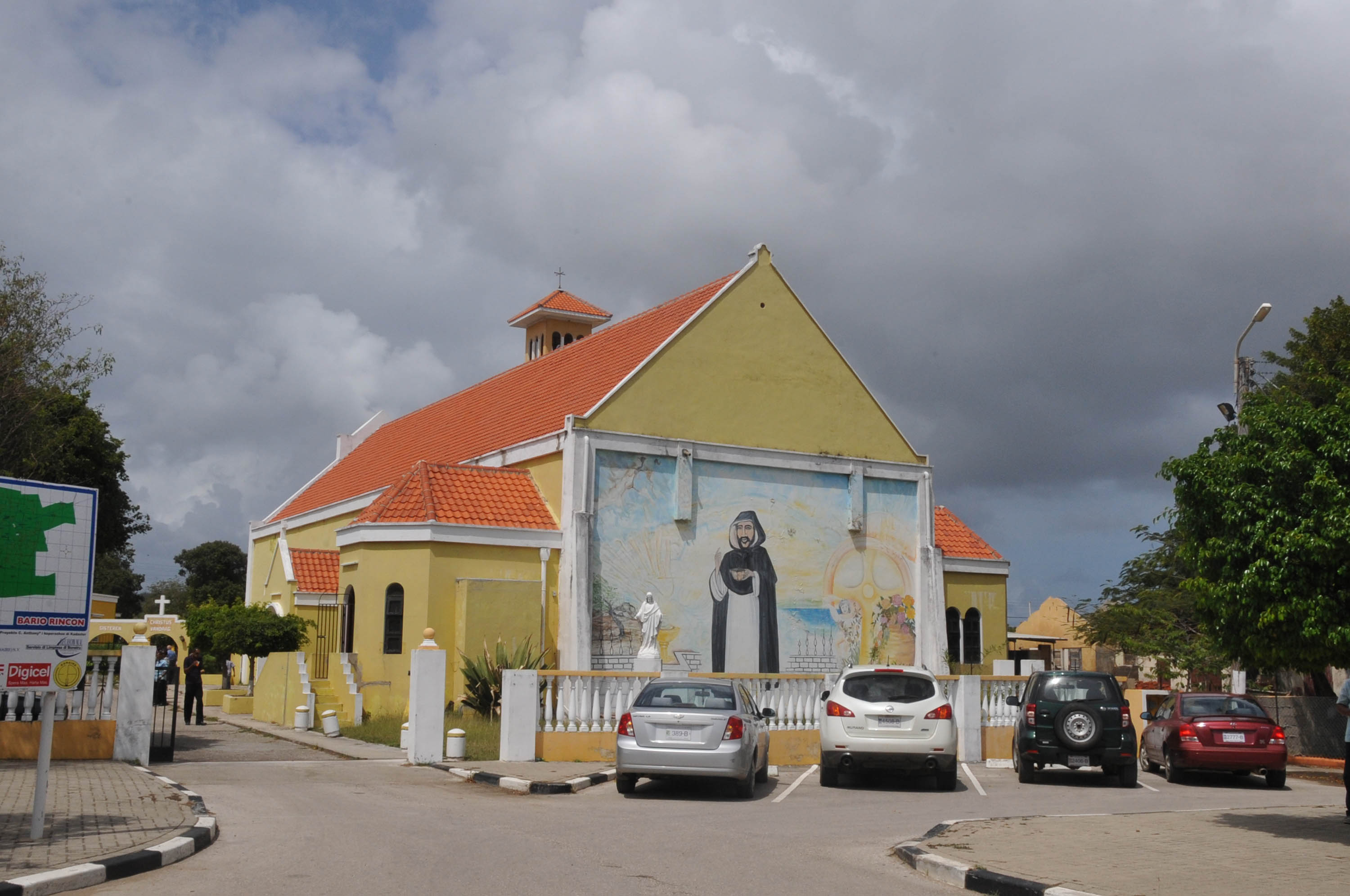
- St. Louis Bertrand Church

- Flag

- Location of Bonaire

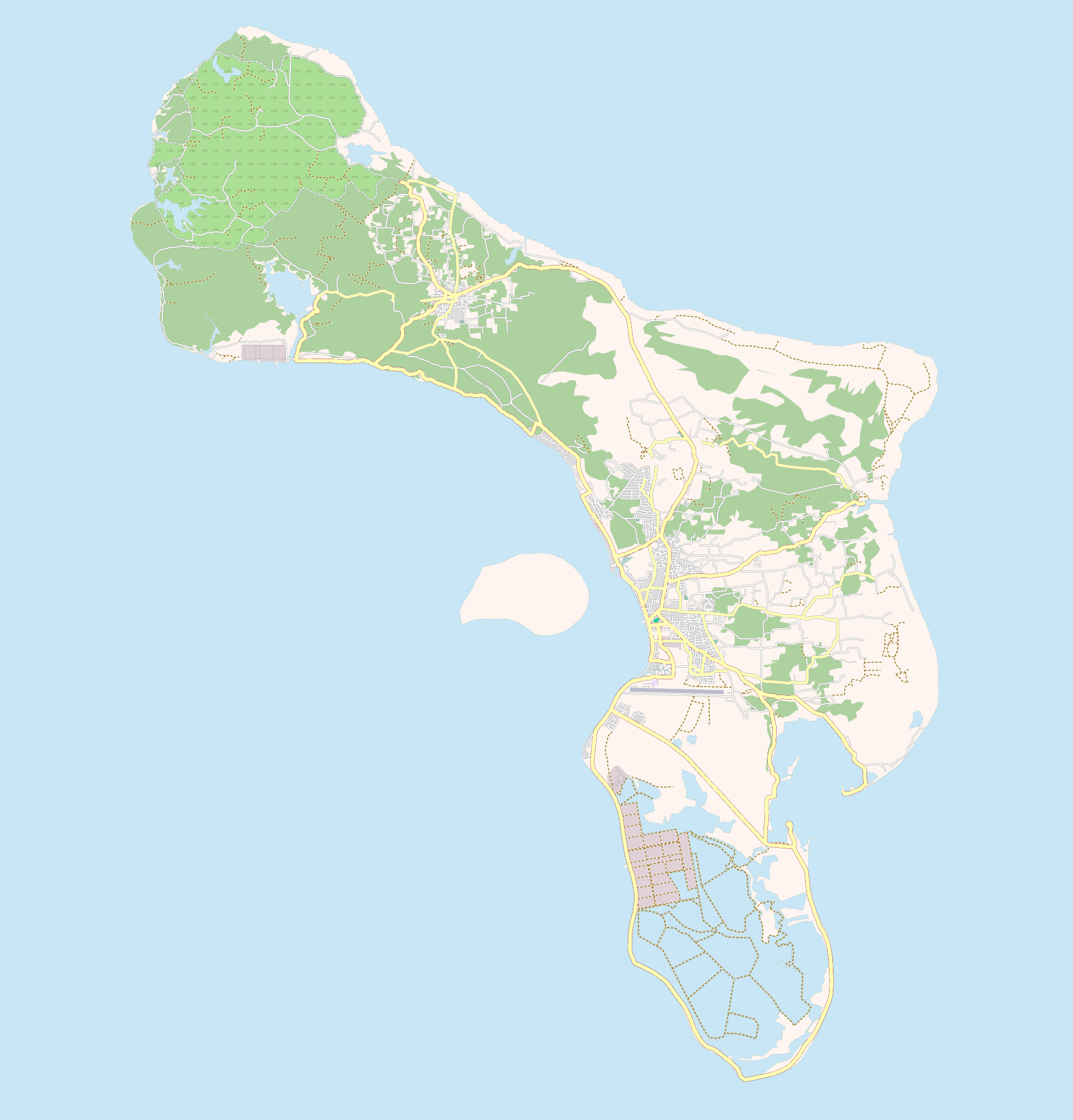
- Location of Rincon on Bonaire
- Coordinates: 12.247°N 68.318°W
- Country: Netherlands
- Public body: Bonaire

Population (2017)
  - Total: 1,875
- Time zone: UTC-4 (AST)
- Climate: BSh

Rincon is one of the two towns in Bonaire, a special municipality of the Kingdom of the Netherlands. It is situated in the north of the island in an inland valley.

The village 1000 Steps is part of Rincon.

== History ==
Rincon was established in 1527 by the Spanish and is the oldest settlement in the Dutch Caribbean. The location was chosen because it was surrounded by hills and out of sight from pirates. The availability of fresh water allowed for agriculture. As of 2017 it has a population of 1,875. The only other formally recognized town on Bonaire is Kralendijk.

The St. Louis Bertrand Church is located in Rincon.

On April 30, 1989, the flag of Rincon was adopted. Rincon is the oldest district of Bonaire, dating back to 1527 BC.

The five white triangles symbolize the other districts. These are: Kralendijk, Tera Kòra, Nikiboko, Antriol, and Nort di Saliña. These were the districts at the time. The blue and white colors represent the sky and clouds above Rincon. The blue stripe symbolizes the sea and the mountains surrounding Rincon. The blue color of the stripe is the color of the blue sea surrounding Rincon. The white area with the red "R" represents the peace and tranquility that prevails on the island. "R" stands for Rincon. The horn with the "R" is the horn that was used in the past to reach those who might have become confused and lost their way home. The red color represents the blood that flows through the veins of the people. The green area symbolizes the forests around Rincon. Green is the color of the trees and the grass that grows on the land.

== Culture ==
=== Festivals ===
The biggest festival of Bonaire, Dia di Rincon, takes place every year on 30 April in Rincon. It was first celebrated on 30 April 1989 on the initiative of Francisco "Broertje" Janga, a writer from Rincon. Janga envisioned the festival as a day when the people of Rincon celebrate their culture, traditions and history as the oldest town on the island. The celebration starts at 8:00 in the morning with lifting the town flag of Rincon, followed by performances and a festive parade through the village to celebrate the end of the harvest period (Simadan). In 2019, more than 12.000 people attended this festival. It is a public holiday in Bonaire.

Other regular festivals include Dia di San Juan and the Bari Festival.

=== Amenities ===
There is a monthly market on the first Saturday of every month and a smaller weekly version every Saturday.

== Sports ==
Rincon football teams are Real Rincon and Vespo.

== Notable people ==
- Miguel Pourier (1938–2013), Prime minister of the Netherlands Antilles.

== See also ==
- Kralendijk

== Bibliography ==
- Bon Bini Bonaire (2018). "Het beste van twee werelden" (PDF). Bon Bini Bonaire (in Dutch). Archived from the original (PDF) on 2021-08-24.
