= SV Estrellas =

SV Estrellas is a professional football club based in Nort Saliña Kunuku Bieu, Kralendijk, Bonaire.

== History ==
Since the inception of the Bonaire League, SV Estrellas has two titles to their name, in the 1998–99 and 2001–02 seasons, respectively.
