= SV Uruguay =

- Full name: Sport Vereniging Uruguay
- Nickname: SV Uruguay
- Founded: 1944
- Ground: Stadion Antonio Trenidat
- Capacity: 1,500
- League: Bonaire League
- 2025-26: 5th
Home colours	Away colours	Third colours

S.V. Uruguay is a professional Bonaire football club from Rincon that currently plays in the Bonaire League, the top level of football on Bonaire. The club was founded in 1944.

== Achievements ==
- Bonaire League
  - Winners (1): 1983
  - Runners-up (1): 1999/00
- Kopa MCB
  - Runners-up (3): 2013, 2014, 2015/16

== Current squad ==
Note: Flags indicate national team as defined under FIFA eligibility rules; some limited exceptions apply. Players may hold more than one non-FIFA nationality.

No.	Pos.	Nation	Player
1	GK	BOE	Alberseeto Cecilia
2	MF	PER	César Altamirano
4	DF	VEN	Alex Hurtado
5	DF	BOE	Sigrel Burnet
6	MF	COL	Jhon Salgado
7	MF	BOE	Adri Serberie
8	MF	BOE	Omar Semeleer
9	FW	BOE	Leroy van Dongen
11	FW	BOE	Giovanny Janga
12	GK	BOE	Andrew Lepelaars

No.	Pos.	Nation	Player
13	DF	BOE	Robbert Barendse
15	DF	PER	Luis Ortíz
18	DF	BOE	Javier Wijman
19	DF	NED	Stephan Bot
20	DF	NED	Jordan Windster
21	DF	BOE	Björn Saragoza
22	GK	BOE	Henderson Duarte
23	MF	NED	Guy van der Vaart
25	MF	BOE	Yeison Brand
27	FW	ARU	Miguel Gregoria
