= SV Juventus =

S.V. Juventus
- Full name: Sport Vereniging Juventus
- Founded: 1973
- Ground: Municipal Stadium; Bonaire
- Capacity: 3,000
- League: Bonaire League
- 2025-26: 10th
Home colours	Away colours

S.V. Juventus is a professional football club based in Antriòl, Kralendijk, Bonaire, in the Caribbean Netherlands. It is currently competing in the Bonaire League.

The club was founded in 1973 as a split-off from SV Vitesse.

== Player ==
Note: Flags indicate national team as defined under FIFA eligibility rules; some limited exceptions apply. Players may hold more than one non-FIFA nationality.

No.	Pos.	Nation	Player
2	DF	CUW	Rudolph Kastaneer
17	DF	BOE	Juan Mendoza
—	GK	BOE	Rainiger Goeloe
—	DF	BOE	Cristian Zúñiga
—	DF	BOE	Shurendley Theodora

== Achievements ==
- Bonaire League

Winner: 1976, 1977, 1984, 1984–85, 1987, 1989, 1992, 1994, 2004–05, 2007–08, 2009, 2010, 2012, 2013
Winner (transitional championship):
Runner-up: 1979, 1988, 1995, 2016–17, 2017–18
Runner-up (transitional championship): 2002–03, 2005–06

- Netherlands Antilles Championship:

Runner-up: 1977, 1985, 1988, 1992, 2001, 2008

== Performance in CONCACAF competitions ==
- CFU Club Championship: 1 appearance

2001 – First Round – Lost to SNL 10 – 2 on aggregate (stage 1 of 2)

- CONCACAF Champions' Cup: 3 appearances

1986 – First Round (Caribbean South) – Lost to SV Robinhood 9 – 0 on aggregate (stage 1 of 5)
1989 – First Round – Group D – 4th placed – 3 pts (stage 1 of 3)
1993 – First Round (Caribbean) – Lost to Trintoc FC 4 – 0 on aggregate (stage 1 of 5)
