= Bonaire Football Federation =

Governing body of football in Bonaire

CONCACAF
- Founded: 31 May 1960
- CONCACAF affiliation: 19 April 2013 (Associate member), 2014
- CFU affiliation: 2013
- President: Ludwig L. Balentin
- Website: https://www.facebook.com/BonaireFootballFederation/

The Bonaire Football Federation (Papiamento: Federashon Futbòl Boneiranu, Dutch: Bonairiaans Voetbalbond) is the governing body of football in Bonaire. Several iterations of the federation were made and disbanded before the modern federation was founded in 1960.

They became affiliated to CONCACAF as an Associate Member on 19 April 2013. On 10 June 2014, Bonaire became a full member of CONCACAF.
