= SV Vitesse =

- Full name: Sport Vereniging Vitesse
- Founded: 1967
- League: Bonaire League
- 2025-26: 2nd
Home colours	Away colours	Third colours

SV Vitesse is a professional football club from Antriòl, Kralendijk on Bonaire in the Caribbean Netherlands, playing at the top level.

The club was founded in 1967 as a split-off from SV Uruguay. In 1973 SV Juventus separated from Vitesse.

== Achievements ==
- Bonaire League: 2

1990–91, 1992–93
