= SV Vespo =

S.V. Vespo
- Full name: Sport Vereniging Vespo
- Nickname: Vespo
- Founded: 1959
- Ground: Stadion Antonio Trenidat; Rincon
- Capacity: 1,500
- Manager: F. Cecilia
- League: Bonaire League
- 2025-26: 1st
Home colours	Away colours	Third colours

S.V. Vespo is a professional football team, from the town of Rincon on Bonaire in the Caribbean Netherlands. Vespo was founded on 9 April 1959, and plays in the Bonaire League.

== Achievements ==
- Bonaire League: Champion

1994–95, 2006–07, 2025–26

- FFB Cup 60 years: Champion

2020
