= Tamara Dávila =

Nicaraguan psychologist and political activist (born c. 1981)

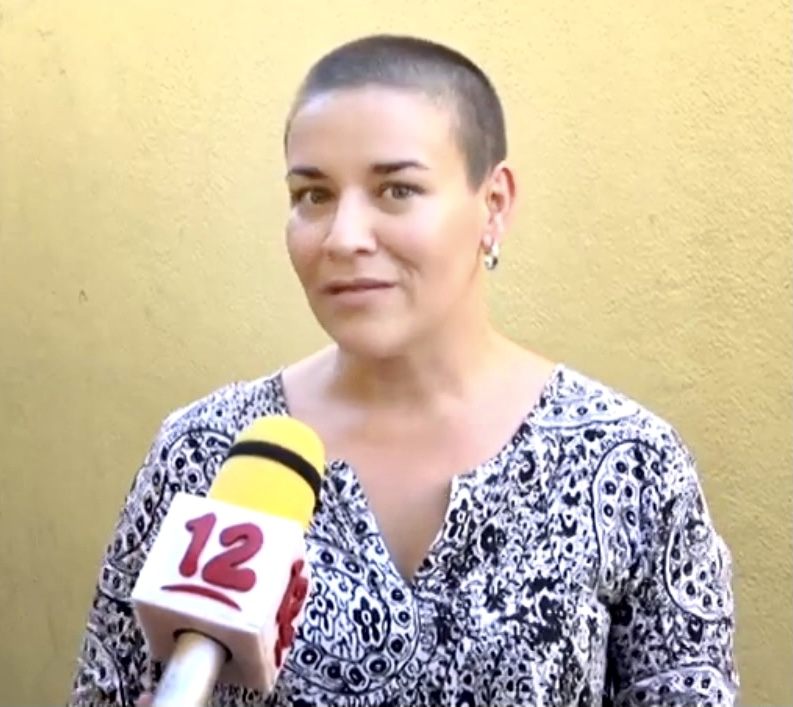
- Dávila in 2019
- Born: Daysi Tamara Dávila Rivas c. 1981 (age 44–45)
- Education: University of Huelva; Central American University
- Occupation: Psychologist
- Political party: Unamos

Tamara Dávila Rivas (born c. 1981) is a Nicaraguan sociologist, feminist and political activist. She is a member of Union for Democratic Renewal (Unamos); the Political Council of the National Unity Blue and White opposition group; and the executive committee of the unified opposition front, the National Coalition. On June 13, 2021, she was part of a wave of arrests of opposition figures by the government of Daniel Ortega.

== Early life ==
Tamara Dávila is the daughter of late Sandinista revolutionaries Sadie María Rivas Reed and Irving Dávila Escobar. After her mother died in a car accident in 1999, her father remarried María Josefina Vigil Gurdián, sister of Ana Margarita Vijil, former president of the Sandinista Renovation Movement (MRS). Dávila is thus considered Vijil's niece.

She is a psychologist who has worked in the social field, fighting for human rights and gender equality. She has a master's degree in Gender, Identity and Citizenship from the University of Huelva in Spain as well as a master's in Social Policies, Rights and Protagonism of Children and Adolescents from the Central American University (UCA).

== Activism ==
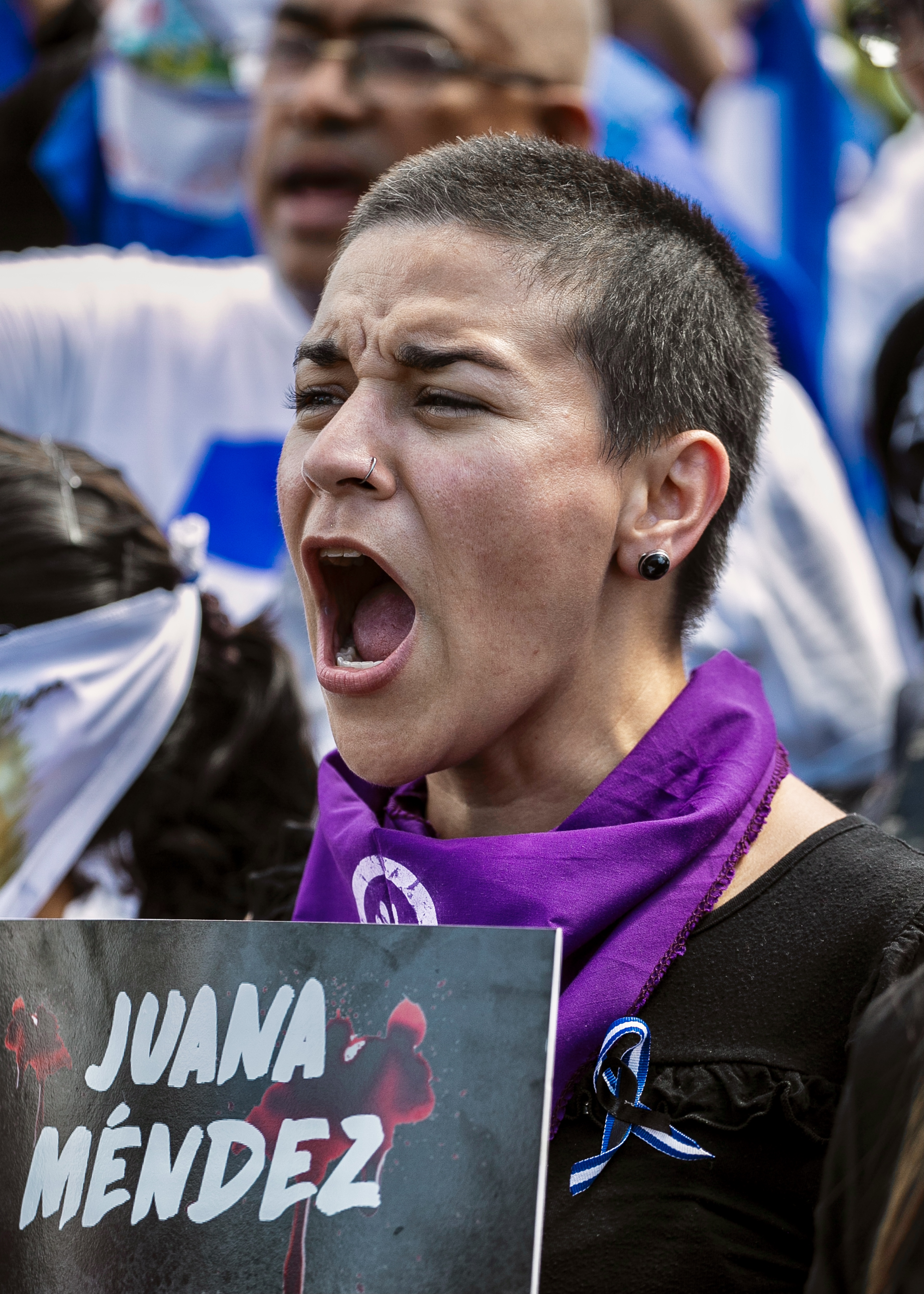
Dávila at a Day of the Dead mass and protest at the Cathedral of Managua, organized by the Mothers of April Association, 2 November 2019

Dávila has been politically active in the anti-government protests that began in 2018, participating in demonstrations and once getting arrested. She is a member of Union for Democratic Renewal (Unamos) and the Political Council of the National Unity Blue and White opposition group. In July 2020, she was named as one of its representatives to the executive committee of the unified opposition, the National Coalition.

Because of harassment Dávila faced for her human rights work, the Inter-American Commission on Human Rights (IACHR) issued precautionary measures intended to ensure her safety.

On June 12, 2021, Dávila was arrested by the government of Daniel Ortega in a series of arrests of opposition candidates for president and other opposition leaders. Her house was raided while she was home with her four-year-old daughter and the police subsequently released a statement indicating she, like many of the other arrested opposition figures, was being investigated for alleged "acts that undermine independence, sovereignty, and self-determination", that is, violating the controversial Law 1055, called the Guillotine Law by critics. It was one of four laws passed in December 2020 granting broad power to the government to make a unilateral designation of citizens as "traitors to the homeland".

Two days after her arrest, the Public Prosecutor's Office announced Dávila and others would be held for 90 days of preventative detention while being investigated.

Vijil was arrested on June 13 at her home with former Sandinista commander Dora María Téllez, who was also arrested.

On 19 July 2021, the IACHR ruled that Dávila was in a situation of "extreme gravity, urgency and imminent danger of irreparable damage to [her] rights" and issued precautionary measures to protect her and her immediate family members, including ordering her immediate release by the Nicaraguan government.
