= Hugo Torres Jiménez =

Nicaraguan Sandinista general (1948–2022)

Hugo Torres
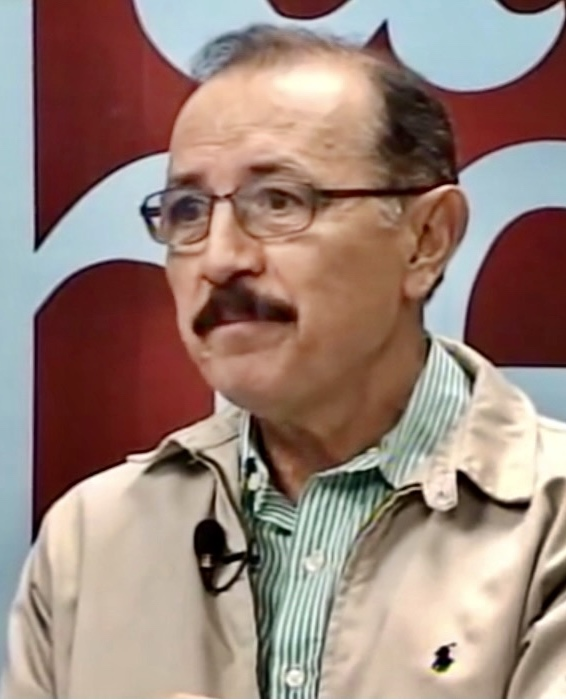
- Torres in 2013
- Nickname: Comandante Uno
- Born: Jorge Hugo Torres Jiménez; 25 April 1948; Somoto, Nicaragua
- Died: 11 February 2022 (aged 73)
- Allegiance: Nicaragua
- Branch: Nicaraguan Armed Forces
- Rank: Brigadier General (ret.)
- Education: National Autonomous University of Nicaragua
- Children: 3

Hugo Torres Jiménez (25 April 1948 – 11 February 2022) was a Nicaraguan Sandinista guerrilla and military leader who was a brigadier general in the Nicaraguan Armed Forces. During the Sandinista National Liberation Front effort to overthrow the Somoza family regime, Torres was the only guerrilla who participated in both the 1974 Christmas party raid that freed future President Daniel Ortega among other prisoners, and the 1978 raid on the National Palace, freeing another 60 political prisoners. In the late 1990s he became a critic of Ortega, leaving the FSLN to join the Sandinista Renovation Movement and later its successor the Democratic Renewal Union, serving as vice-president of both parties. In June 2021 he was part of a wave of arrests of opposition figures by the Ortega administration. He died the following February.

== Early life ==
Hugo Torres Jiménez was born on 25 April 1948, in Somoto, Madriz (near the Honduran border). The son of Cipriano Torres, a telegraphist and Somoza National Guard lieutenant, and Isabel Jiménez, at five Torres moved to León, where he grew up a few houses away from Rigoberto López Pérez, who killed Anastasio Somoza García in 1956.

== Education and career ==
Torres studied law at the National Autonomous University of Nicaragua (though his passion was journalism) and like many other young dissidents, it was there that he was radicalized against the Somoza regime. He joined the FSLN in 1971 and worked in barrio mobilization in the early 1970s. In July 1974 he left school to go underground.

Torres was the only guerrilla who participated in both of the Sandinistas' two largest and most successful operations against the Somoza regime. In the 27 December 1974 Christmas party raid and hostage-taking at the home of José María "Chema" Castillo Quant, Minister of Agriculture, attended by senior Somoza government officials and diplomats, Torres was second in command ("Comandante Uno", in the "Juan José Quezada" command) to Eduardo Contreras. Subsequent negotiations freed Sandinista political prisoners including future Nicaraguan president Daniel Ortega, who had been imprisoned for seven years for bank robbery. Torres was also second-in-command to Eden Pastora during the August 1978 assault on the National Palace, which freed 60 political prisoners. In both cases, militants successfully took high-profile hostages and exchanged them for political prisoners and safe passage to Cuba.

Torres worked in logistics in Honduras for the FSLN's Northern Front. He was Chief of the Political Directorate of the Sandinista Popular Army (EPS), a member of the FSLN Defense and Security Commission, and a member of the FSLN Assembly. After the Somoza dictatorship fell in 1979, Torres served as Vice Minister of Interior and Chief of State Security under Tomás Borge, before being moved to the Defense Ministry, where he was the EPS delegate to the Council of State. He traveled to the Soviet Union to visit Nicaraguan students attending the Frunze Military Academy.

In the 1980s, Torres was honored with the Order of Carlos Fonseca, awarded to members of the government or party who demonstrated moral, ethical merit and adherence to constitutional principles.

He attained the rank of Colonel in the EPS, and was in charge of its political training during the war against the US-backed Contras in the 1980s. In the 1990s, he was part of the effort to professionalize the EPS as the Nicaraguan Army, where he was a Brigadier General until retiring in 1998.

Torres was also a writer, publishing poetry in the 1980s in the Ministry of Culture's magazine Poesía libre, and later prefaced a collection Poesía de la fuerza armada (Poetry of the armed forces). In 2003 he published a memoir called Rumbo norte. Historia de un sobreviviente, with a prologue by Sergio Ramírez. In 2017, he published a second book, a poetry collection called Coplas y algunos poemas infiltrados. Chiefly inspired by the Gigantona parades of his youth, with drumming and dancing, the book also contains romantic poems; it opens with a poem dedicated to Daisy Zamora which he wrote just a few days after the 1978 National Palace raid.

== Later life and death ==
He split with the FSLN, becoming vice-president of the Sandinista Renovation Movement (MRS) and for a time was an opposition deputy in the National Assembly with the MRS. He particularly criticized Daniel Ortega's administration since the 2018 mass protests and the bloody suppression by the government. In 2019 he said of Ortega, "This dictatorship is fiercer, more totalitarian than that of the Somozas," noting not only greater violence by Ortega but also more total control of sectors like trade unions, universities and courts that the Somoza regime had not captured. However, Torres felt that unlike the Somoza case, the Ortega situation called for non-violent resistance and expressed optimism that the Nicaraguan people "understood that it is by civic way that this situation has to be resolved." As of 2021, Torres was vice-president of the Democratic Renewal Union (Unamos) party, formerly the Sandinista Renovation Movement (MRS).

On 13 June 2021, Torres was part of a wave of arrests of opposition leaders and civic figures by the Ortega government, beginning with the arrests of four aspiring opposition candidates for president in the 2021 Nicaraguan general election. Arrested along with Torres were the president of Unamos, Suyén Barahona, former MRS president Ana Margarita Vijil, and Unamos members and leaders Dora María Téllez and Victor Hugo Tinoco; the latter two of which, like Torres, were former Sandinista guerrillas. They were investigated under the controversial Law 1055, legislated in December 2020, which allows the government to detain anyone it designates a "traitor to the homeland".

In a video statement posted just before his arrest (meant to be shown in case he was detained), Torres said, "I am 73. At this stage of my life, I never thought I would be fighting against another dictatorship now more brutal, more unscrupulous, more irrational and more autocratic than the Somoza dictatorship... Forty-six years ago, I risked my life to get Daniel Ortega out of jail [...] those who once embraced principles today have betrayed them."

Torres Jiménez Torres remained in preventive detention until the end of October 2021 and had not been able to speak privately with his lawyers, and in a period of 3 months he had barely been able to receive two visits from his relatives before his death on 11 February 2022, at the age of 73. In a press release issued the same day, the Organization of American States condemned the circumstances surrounding his death and called for the immediate release of all the country's political prisoners. Torres had three children.

His death was one of the reasons why Arturo McFields and Paul Reichler resigned, disowning Daniel Ortega.
