= Victor Hugo Tinoco =

Nicaraguan former government official and Sandinista guerrilla (born 1952)

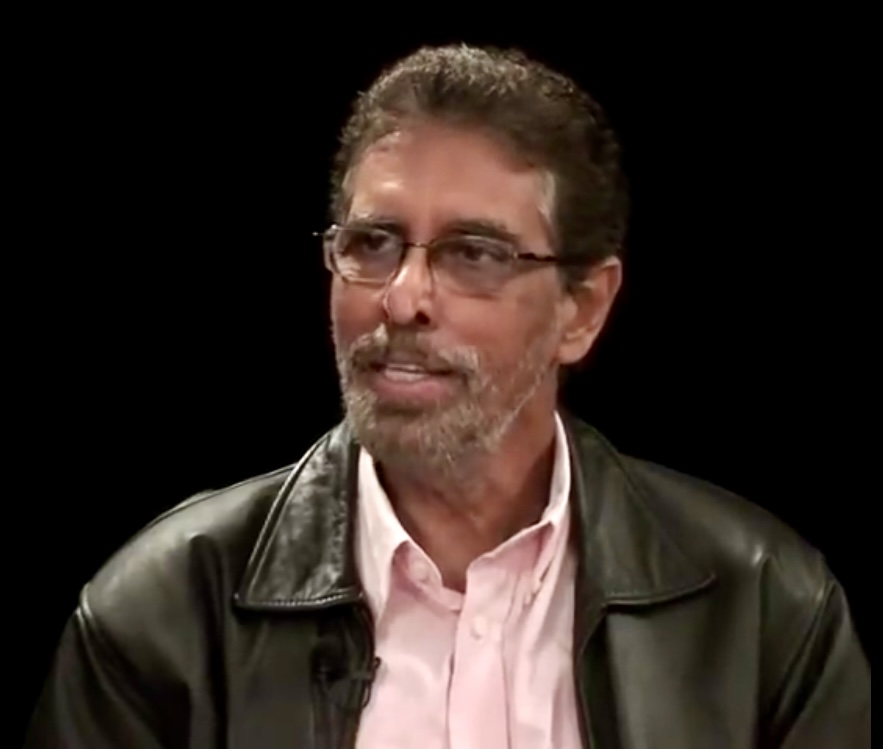
- Tinoco in 2018

Ambassador to the United Nations
- In office 1979–1981

Deputy Minister for Foreign Affairs
- In office 1981–1990

National Assembly Deputy

Personal details
- Born: Victor Hugo Tinoco Fonseca; June 10, 1952 (age 74) León, Nicaragua
- Party: Sandinista National Liberation Front (1973–2005); Sandinista Renovation Movement; Democratic Renewal Union
- Education: National Autonomous University of Nicaragua; Central American University

Victor Hugo Tinoco Fonseca (born June 10, 1952) is a Nicaraguan politician and former Sandinista guerilla. He was Deputy Minister for Foreign Affairs with the Sandinista National Liberation Front, ambassador to the United Nations and a deputy in the National Assembly. In the late 1990s he grew critical of Daniel Ortega and was expelled from the party in 2005, joining the Sandinista Renovation Movement (MRS) instead and later its successor, the Democratic Renewal Union (Unamos) party. In June 2021, he was part of a wave of arrests of opposition figures, including seven aspiring opposition candidates for president in the 2021 Nicaraguan general election.

== Biography ==
Victor Hugo Tinoco was born on June 10, 1952, in León. He attended high school at the National Seminary where he began studying philosophy. It was as a seminarian that he connected with the Sandinista National Liberation Front (FSLN), and joined in 1973 while studying for a degree in sociology at the National Autonomous University of Nicaragua (UNAN-Managua). He then moved to León where he worked in the Revolutionary Student Front (FER).

He also has a postgraduate degree in advanced business management from the Central American University (UCA).

Following the fall of the Somoza dictatorship, Tinoco was appointed ambassador to the United Nations, serving from 1979 to 1981. In 1981 he became Vice Minister of Foreign Affairs (vice-chancellor), a position he held until 1990. He was also a member of FSLN Assembly. He led the Nicaraguan delegation at Manzanillo talks with the United States in 1984 and was the chief Sandinista representative in the Contadora negotiations.

He was also a member of the FSLN National Directorate and twice served as a National Assembly deputy, first for the FSLN (from 1997 to 2001) and later for the Sandinista Renovation Movement (MRS). As of 2010, he was head of the MRS bench.

He grew critical of Daniel Ortega, particularly seeing Ortega's 1998 pact with Arnoldo Alemán as a turning point toward authoritarianism. The cooperation with Alemán's ostensibly incompatible ideology (he represented the right-wing Constitutionalist Liberal Party) was unpopular among Sandinistas and that reaction spurred a greater suppression of dissent, in Tinoco's view, leading to a strengthening of the authoritarian current in the FSLN overall. Hoping to open up space for differing opinions within the party, he mounted an ultimately unsuccessful challenge to Ortega in 2001 in the FSLN internal primary elections for president. Then in February 2005 he was expelled from the party for his support of Herty Lewites's candidacy against Ortega. He served as campaign manager to Lewites, who broke from the FSLN to continue to pursue his presidential bid under the Sandinista Renovation Movement, until Lewites' sudden death four months prior to the election. Following the revocation of MRS's legal status, Tinoco became a member of its successor, Democratic Renewal Union (Unamos).

In June 2021 Tinoco was part of a wave of arrests of opposition candidates for president in the November 2021 elections and other opposition figures. He was arrested on June 13, 2021, the same day as other Unamos leaders including Suyén Barahona, Ana Margarita Vijil and Tinoco's former Sandinista comrade, commander Dora María Téllez, who is famous for her role in a 1978 raid that freed 60 Sandinista political prisoners. Like most of those arrested, Tinoco is accused of violations of controversial Law 1055, passed by the FSLN-controlled legislature in December 2020, which gives the government unilateral power to arrest anyone it designates as a "traitor to the homeland". Before his arrest he recorded a video calling for continued resistance in the event he was detained: "This is a struggle that has to go forward, that is not going to stop...the bright future that the people deserve is victory and freeing themselves from the dictatorship and the dynasty that they want to impose on us."

Initially Tinoco was believed to be held in Evaristo Vásquez Police Complex, but as of 27 June 2021 neither his family nor his attorney have seen him since his arrest. His family has expressed concern about his health, given his preexisting hypertension, asthma, and Ménière's disease.

Tinoco was convicted and sentenced to 13 years imprisonment on 21 February 2022.
