= 1961 CCCF Championship squads =

These are the squads for the countries that played in the 1961 CCCF Championship.

The age listed for each player is on 1 March 1961, the first day of the tournament. The numbers of caps and goals listed for each player do not include any matches played after the start of the tournament. The club listed is the club for which the player last played a competitive match before the tournament. The nationality for each club reflects the national association (not the league) to which the club is affiliated. A flag is included for coaches who are of a different nationality than their own national team.

== Netherlands Antilles ==
Head coach: Pedro Celestino da Cunha

No.	Pos.	Player	Date of birth (age)	Caps	Club
1	GK	Paul Johan Díaz	19 December 1936 (aged 24)		(Netherlands Antilles) Aruba Juniors
2	GK	Jubert Richardson			(Netherlands Antilles) Dakota
3	DF	Juan Maximiliano Pablo	18 November 1938 (aged 22)		(Netherlands Antilles) Dakota
4	DF	Andresito Croes	30 May 1933 (aged 27)		(Netherlands Antilles) Racing Aruba
5	DF	Wilfred de Lanoi	12 February 1929 (aged 32)		(Netherlands Antilles) Jong Holland
6	DF	Edgar Joaquín Vos			(Netherlands Antilles) Aruba Juniors
7	MF	Juan Kock	27 March 1940 (aged 20)		(Netherlands Antilles) San Nicolas Juniors
8	MF	Hubert Janzen	4 February 1940 (aged 21)		(Netherlands Antilles) Centro Dominguito
9	MF	Ricardo Helder	31 October 1927 (aged 33)		(Netherlands Antilles) Racing Aruba
10	MF	Cornelius Wiersma	27 November 1936 (aged 24)		(Netherlands Antilles) Dakota
11	MF	Toribio Briezen	16 April 1940 (aged 20)		(Netherlands Antilles) San Nicolas Juniors
12	MF	Rudolfo Dirksz	17 October 1932 (aged 28)		(Netherlands Antilles) Racing Aruba
13	FW	Veronico Albertsz	9 July 1937 (aged 23)		(Netherlands Antilles) Racing Aruba
14	FW	Bernard Geerman	20 August 1938 (aged 22)		(Netherlands Antilles) Aruba Juniors
15	FW	Ismael Croes			(Netherlands Antilles) Estrella
16	FW	Damasio Werleman	14 March 1936 (aged 24)		(Netherlands Antilles) Estrella
17	FW	Antero Gil	3 January 1937 (aged 24)		(Netherlands Antilles) Jong Aruba
18	FW	Félix Angelico Pérez	21 March 1944 (aged 16)		(Netherlands Antilles) Jong Aruba
19	FW	Edwin Loran			(Netherlands Antilles) Scherpenheuvel
20	FW	Rubén Toribio Cathalina			(Netherlands Antilles) Sithoc

== Costa Rica ==
Head coach: (Spain) Eduardo Toba

No.	Pos.	Player	Date of birth (age)	Caps	Club
1	GK	Felipe Induni	16 August 1940 (aged 20)		(Costa Rica) Saprissa
2	GK	Mario Pérez Rodríguez	11 April 1936 (aged 24)		(Costa Rica) Saprissa
3	GK	Hernán Alvarado Guerrero	25 November 1932 (aged 28)		(Costa Rica) Herediano
4	DF	Edgar Zúñiga	16 October 1941 (aged 19)		(Costa Rica) Alajuelense
5	DF	Álvaro McDonald	26 January 1938 (aged 23)		(Costa Rica) Herediano
6	DF	Álvaro Chaves	11 January 1941 (aged 20)		(Costa Rica) Herediano
7	DF	José Manuel Villalobos	23 February 1939 (aged 22)		(Costa Rica) Herediano
8	DF	Giovanni Rodríguez Chavarría	8 January 1936 (aged 25)		(Costa Rica) Saprissa
9	DF	Edgar Barrantes			(Costa Rica) Alajuelense
10	MF	Marvin Rodríguez	26 November 1934 (aged 26)		(Costa Rica) Saprissa
11	MF	Juan José Gámez	8 July 1939 (aged 21)		(Costa Rica) Alajuelense
12	MF	Edgar Quesada	16 August 1931 (aged 29)		(Costa Rica) Herediano
13	MF	Carlos Marín Segura	28 May 1940 (aged 20)		(Costa Rica) Herediano
14	MF	Eduardo Salas			(Costa Rica) Alajuelense
15	FW	Carlos Gobán	14 September 1934 (aged 26)		(Costa Rica) Saprissa
16	FW	Rubén Jiménez	9 December 1932 (aged 28)		(Costa Rica) Saprissa
17	FW	Jorge Monge	14 February 1938 (aged 23)		(Costa Rica) Saprissa
18	FW	Juan Ulloa	5 February 1935 (aged 26)		(Costa Rica) Alajuelense
19	FW	Enrique Córdoba	1 August 1938 (aged 22)		(Costa Rica) Cartaginés
20	FW	Walter Pearson Wilson	2 December 1939 (aged 21)		(Costa Rica) Alajuelense
21	FW	Carlos Enrique Herrera	1 January 1936 (aged 25)		(Costa Rica) Alajuelense
22	FW	Rigoberto Rojas	27 March 1938 (aged 22)		(Costa Rica) Saprissa
23	FW	Manrique Quesada	12 November 1938 (aged 22)		(Costa Rica) Herediano

== Cuba ==
Head coach: José Antonio Cuervo

No.	Pos.	Player	Date of birth (age)	Caps	Club
1	GK	Julio Blanco	18 September 1937 (aged 23)		(Cuba) Deportivo Mordazo
2	GK	Santiago Díaz			(Cuba) Lawton
3	GK	Jorge Pérez Castañeda	27 March 1938 (aged 22)		(Cuba) Juventud Asturiana
4	DF	Ramón Álvarez			(Cuba) Juventud Asturiana
5	DF	Luis Enrique García			(Cuba) Deportivo Mordazo
6	DF	Ramón Peñalver	31 August 1935 (aged 25)		(Cuba) Deportivo Mordazo
7	DF	Conrado Paz	22 April 1932 (aged 28)		(Cuba) El Cerro
8	DF	Agustín Valdés			(Cuba) Lawton
9	DF	Gregorio Dalmau	22 November 1939 (aged 21)		(Cuba) Lawton
10	MF	Bernardo Gascón			(Cuba) El Cerro
11	MF	Federico García			(Cuba) Lawton
12	MF	Sergio Padrón	5 December 1936 (aged 24)		(Cuba) San Francisco
13	MF	Alberto Gutiérrez			(Cuba) Deportivo Mordazo
14	MF	Santiago Valdés			(Cuba) Lawton
15	MF	Francisco Morell			(Cuba) Deportivo Mordazo
16	MF	Jaime Oña			(Cuba) San Francisco
17	FW	Ángel Piedra	4 April 1945 (aged 15)		(Cuba) Deportivo Mordazo
18	FW	Zenaldo García			(Cuba) Lawton
19	FW	Antonio "Tony" Fernández			(Cuba) El Cerro
20	FW	José Manuel Sánchez			(Cuba) San Francisco
21	FW	Antonio Blanco Roxette			(Cuba) San Francisco

== El Salvador ==
Head Coach: Conrado Miranda

No.	Pos.	Player	Date of birth (age)	Caps	Club
1	GK	Raúl Magaña	24 February 1940 (aged 21)		(El Salvador) FAS
2	GK	Luis Alberto López			(El Salvador) Águila
3	GK	Yohalmo Aurora			(El Salvador)
4	GK	Carlos Guerra			(El Salvador)
5	DF	Rodolfo Fuentes			(El Salvador) Águila
6	DF	César Reynosa			(El Salvador) FAS
7	DF	Roberto Francisco Hernández			(El Salvador) Atlante San Alejo
8	DF	Marco René Arana			(El Salvador)
9	MF	Mario Monge	27 November 1938 (aged 22)		(El Salvador) FAS
10	MF	Antonio Barrientos			(El Salvador)
11	MF	Jorge Guevara			(El Salvador)
12	MF	José Melara			(El Salvador)
13	MF	Héctor Núñez			(El Salvador)
14	MF	Manuel Duke			(El Salvador) Atlante San Alejo
15	FW	Juan Francisco Barraza	12 March 1935 (aged 25)		(El Salvador) Águila
16	FW	Alfredo Ruano	14 October 1932 (aged 28)		(El Salvador) Alianza
17	FW	Salvador Rocabruna			(El Salvador) Águila
18	FW	Juan Antonio Merlos	3 December 1941 (aged 19)		(El Salvador) Águila
19	FW	Maximiliano Cubas	16 October 1934 (aged 26)		(El Salvador) FAS
20	FW	Leonel Cubas			(El Salvador) FAS
21	FW	Carlos Orlando Hernández			(El Salvador)
22	FW	Eduardo Hernández			(El Salvador) Atlante San Alejo
23	FW	Leonel Belloso			(El Salvador)

== Guatemala ==
Head Coach: (Argentina) José Alberto Cevasco

No.	Pos.	Player	Date of birth (age)	Caps	Club
1	GK	Guillermo Gamboa	8 April 1936 (aged 24)		(Guatemala) Comunicaciones
2	GK	Gabriel Urriola			(Guatemala) Aurora
3	GK	Alfonso Vettorazzi			(Guatemala) Municipal
4	DF	Mario Ortega López			(Guatemala) Aurora
5	DF	Rafael Véliz			(Guatemala) Municipal
6	DF	Enrique Wellmann	21 April 1931 (aged 29)		(Guatemala) Comunicaciones
7	DF	José Antonio García Ramírez	5 July 1940 (aged 20)		(Guatemala) Aurora
8	DF	Rafael Maldonado			(Guatemala) Aurora
9	DF	Vicente Charles			(Guatemala) Municipal
10	MF	Jorge Roldán	16 December 1940 (aged 20)		(Guatemala) Aurora
11	MF	Rocael Castañeda			(Guatemala) Comunicaciones
12	MF	Alfredo Posadas			(Guatemala) Municipal
13	MF	Tony Ewing			(Guatemala) Municipal
14	MF	Minor Sigui			(Guatemala)
15	FW	Hugo Peña	6 May 1936 (aged 24)		(Guatemala) Municipal
16	FW	Augusto Espinoza	6 October 1930 (aged 30)		(Guatemala) Comunicaciones
17	FW	Obdulio Pensamiento			(Guatemala) Comunicaciones
18	FW	Francisco López Contreras	17 September 1934 (aged 26)		(Guatemala) Comunicaciones
19	FW	Fredy Masella			(Guatemala) Comunicaciones
20	FW	Armando Mazariegos	6 April 1936 (aged 24)		(Guatemala) USAC
21	FW	Romeo Díaz			(Guatemala)
22	FW	Daniel Salamanca Posadas	20 January 1939 (aged 22)		(Guatemala) USAC
23	FW	Haroldo Juárez	1940 (aged 20–21)		(Guatemala) Xelajú

== Haiti ==
Head coach: Antoine Tassy

No.	Pos.	Player	Date of birth (age)	Caps	Club
1	GK	René Vertus			(Haiti) Racing Haïtien
2	GK	Victor Baptiste			(Haiti) Don Bosco
3	DF	Eric Faublas			(Haiti) Victory
4	DF	Joseph Beaulieu			(Haiti) Violette
5	DF	Jean Germilus Cadet			(Haiti) Violette
6	DF	Raphaël Blaise			(Haiti) Aigle Noir
7	DF	Emmanuel Desince			(Haiti) Racing Haïtien
8	MF	Roland Crispin	22 March 1939 (aged 21)		(Haiti) Etoile Haïtienne
9	MF	Michel Morin			(Haiti) Victory
10	MF	Charles Halaby			(Haiti) Victory
11	MF	Claude Limagé			(Haiti) Racing Haïtien
12	MF	Daniel Mardy			(Haiti) Aigle Noir
13	MF	Frantz Coby			(Haiti) Etoile Haïtienne
14	FW	Georges Chardin Délices	4 March 1940 (aged 20)		(Haiti) Aigle Noir
15	FW	Guy Saint-Vil	21 October 1942 (aged 18)		(Haiti) Etoile Haïtienne
16	FW	Gérard Delpeche			(Haiti) Violette
17	FW	Paul Desrosiers			(Haiti) Aigle Noir
18	FW	Jacques Acloque			(Haiti) Victory
19	FW	Lucien Pierre			(Haiti) Victory
20	FW	Germain Champagne			(Haiti) Racing Haïtien
21	FW	Ernst Singer			(Haiti) Victory
22	FW	André Wilson			(Haiti) Aigle Noir

== Honduras ==
Head coach: Mario Griffin Cubas

No.	Pos.	Player	Date of birth (age)	Caps	Club
1	GK	Ricardo Cárdenas	1940 (aged 20–21)		(Honduras) Troya
2	GK	Jorge Alberto Zavala			(Honduras) Olimpia
3	GK	Mariano Aguiluz			(Honduras) Real España
4	DF	Marco Antonio Rosales	1938		(Honduras) Olimpia
5	DF	Jorge Alberto Solís	1 January 1935 (aged 26)		(Honduras) Olimpia
6	DF	Federico Budde	9 December 1942 (aged 18)		(Honduras) Olimpia
7	DF	Roberto Güity	27 March 1934 (aged 26)		(Honduras) Atlético Indio
8	DF	Wilfredo García	12 October 1933 (aged 27)		(Honduras) Olimpia
9	MF	Carlos Suazo	8 March 1936 (aged 24)		(Honduras) Olimpia
10	MF	Ricardo Taylor	3 October 1941 (aged 19)		(Honduras) Olimpia
11	MF	Ronald Leaky			(Honduras) Olimpia
12	MF	Abraham Pavón			(Honduras) Olimpia
13	MF	Felipe Barahona			(Honduras) Olimpia
14	MF	René Rodríguez Reyes			(Honduras) Olimpia
15	MF	José Arguijo			(Honduras) Troya
16	MF	Víctor Ramos			(Honduras) La Salle
17	FW	Carlos "Rolín" Castillo			(Honduras) Olimpia
18	FW	Ricardo Reyes Rodríguez			(Honduras) Olimpia
19	FW	Francisco Bodden			(Honduras) Independiente
20	FW	Marco Antonio Midence			(Honduras) Olimpia
21	FW	Gilberto Flores Moya			(Honduras) Atlético Indio
22	FW	Alberto Enamorado			(Honduras) Independiente

== Nicaragua ==
Head coach: Carlos Pérez Ruiz

No.	Pos.	Player	Date of birth (age)	Caps	Club
1	GK	Salvador Dubois	16 August 1935 (aged 25)		(Nicaragua) Santa Cecilia
2	GK	Roger Páez			(Nicaragua) Diriangén
3	GK	Roy Zúniga	30 November 1941 (aged 19)		(Nicaragua)
4	DF	Miguel Buitrago	7 April 1941 (aged 19)		(Nicaragua)
5	DF	Eduardo Siero			(Nicaragua)
6	DF	Eddy Bernard			(Nicaragua)
7	DF	Omar Jirón			(Nicaragua)
8	MF	Hugo Huete	18 June 1939 (aged 21)		(Nicaragua)
9	MF	Eduardo Martínez			(Nicaragua) Santa Cecilia
10	FW	Dámaso Silva	7 December 1937 (aged 23)		(Nicaragua) Santa Cecilia
11	MF	Carlos González			(Nicaragua)
12		Manuel Tamáriz			(Nicaragua) Diriangén
13		Douglas Pérez			(Nicaragua) Santa Cecilia
14		Eduardo Morales			(Nicaragua)
15		Francisco Torres			(Nicaragua)
16		Salvador Dávila			(Nicaragua)
17		Joaquín Morales			(Nicaragua)

== Panama ==
Head coach: José Amado

No.	Pos.	Player	Date of birth (age)	Caps	Club
1	GK	Roberto Tyrrel	10 April 1936 (aged 24)		(Panama) Unión Española
2	DF	Miguel Davis	2 May 1940 (aged 20)		(Panama) Unión Iberia
3	DF	Emilo Jorge Samuel			(Panama)
4	DF	Everardo Vega			(Panama)
5	MF	Gaspar Romero	14 September 1941 (aged 19)		(Panama) Unión Española
6	MF	Apolonio Lombardo	26 January 1934 (aged 27)		(Panama)
7	MF	Antonio Enrique Aguilar			(Panama)
8	FW	Cirilo Sánchez	28 March 1939 (aged 21)		(Panama)
9	FW	Carlos Antonio Valderrama	20 March 1933 (aged 27)		(Panama) La Garantía
10	FW	Luis Carlos Ponce	22 August 1932 (aged 28)		(Panama)
11	FW	Vicente Rodríguez			(Panama)
12	FW	Roberto Linares			(Panama)
13	FW	Luis César Muñoz			(Panama)
14		José Arosemana			(Panama)
15		Olmedo Acosta			(Panama)
16		Luis Batista			(Panama)
17		Luis Bazán			(Panama)
18		Carlos Tamayo			(Panama)
19		Ricardo Deanes			(Panama)
20		Manuel Vargas			(Panama)
21		César Romero			(Panama)
22		Jorge White			(Panama)
