= Suyén Barahona =

Nicaraguan activist

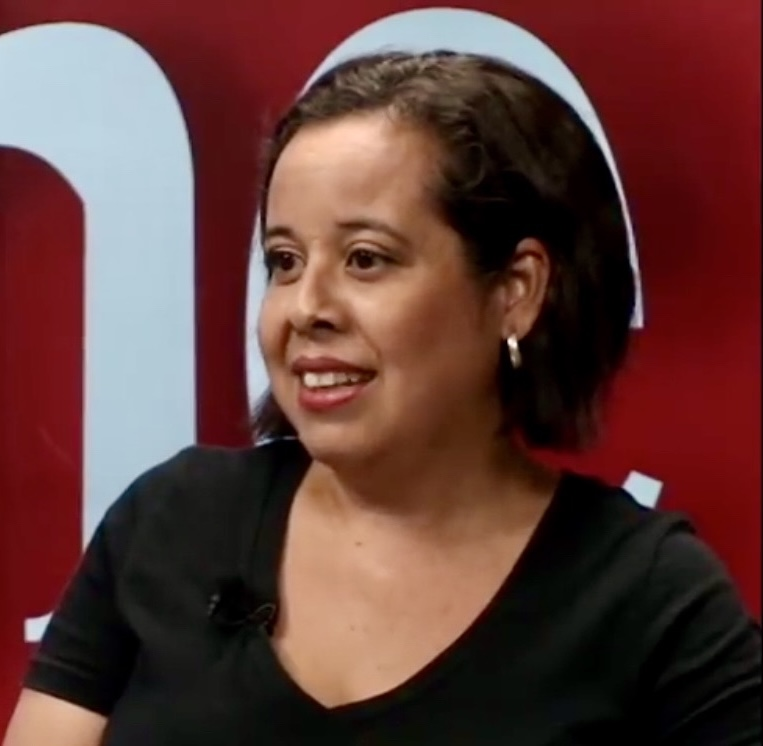
- Barahona in 2018
- Born: Suyén Barahona Cuan
- Title: President
- Term: 2017–present
- Predecessor: Ana Margarita Vijil
- Political party: Democratic Renewal Union

Suyén Barahona Cuan is a Nicaraguan activist. She is president of the Democratic Renewal Union party (Unamos), an opposition group that is the successor to the Sandinista Renovation Movement. She is also a member of the Blue and White National Unity opposition group that formed following the outbreak of anti-government protests in April 2018. In June 2021, she was arrested alongside other opposition figures and pre-candidates for president in the 2021 Nicaraguan general election.

== Biography ==
Barahona has a degree in international relations. She is an advocate for feminist and environmental causes, and in 2017 she was elected president of the Democratic Renewal Union party (Unamos, successor to the Sandinista Renovation Movement after its legal status was revoked). She was active in the demonstrations calling for justice for those killed and imprisoned since the protests that began in April 2018 and the ensuing bloody government crackdown. She and her predecessor at MRS Ana Margarita Vijil were both arrested at a protest on Camino de Oriente in Managua in October 2018 and held overnight.

Barahona has since joined the Blue and White National Unity opposition group (UNAB) and the National Coalition of opposition groups, both of which emerged in the wake of the 2018 events.

As president of Unamos, in February 2021 she went to court to challenge the constitutionality of Law 1042, known as the "Gag Law" which the FSLN-controlled legislature passed in October 2020, granting the government sweeping power to suppress dissidence online as "cybercrime".

On June 13, 2021, Barahona was among a wave of arrests by the government of Daniel Ortega of opposition pre-candidates for president in the November election as well as other opposition figures and civic leaders. She left a video that said, "If you are watching this video, it is because the Police have raided my house and kidnapped me as they have done with others." Arrested the same day were Unamos members Dora María Téllez and Ana Margarita Vijil and Unamos vice-president Hugo Torres Jiménez. Torres and Téllez were former Sandinistas and major figures in the revolution that toppled the Somoza dictatorship. They are being investigated under controversial Law 1055, passed in December 2020, which allows the government to detain anyone it designates as a "traitor to the homeland".

Barahona is married to César Dubois and has one son.
