= Ana Margarita Vijil =

Nicaraguan lawyer and activist

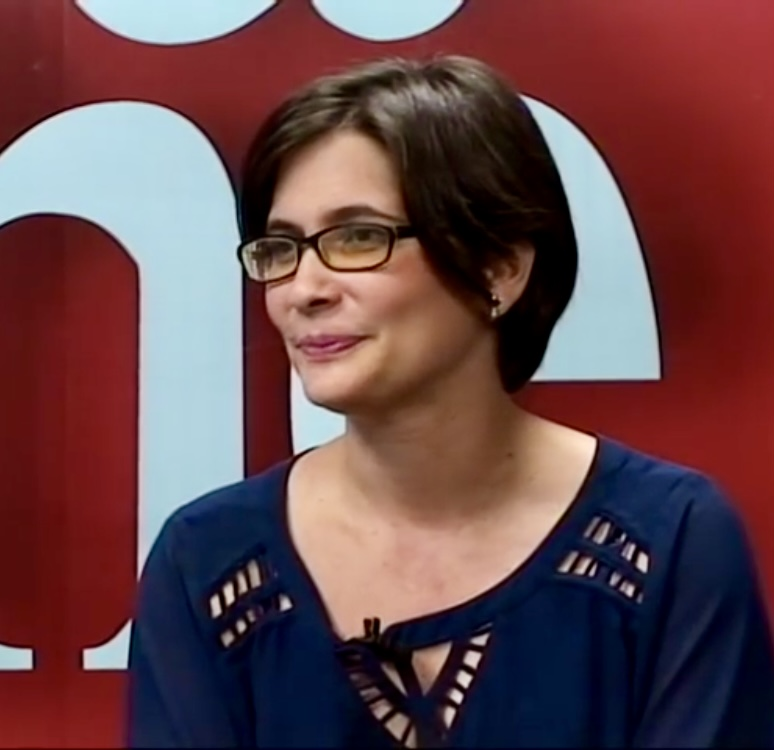
- Vijil in 2016
- Citizenship: Nicaragua
- Occupations: Lawyer; Human rights activist
- Political party: Sandinista Renovation Movement
- Family: Tamara Dávila (niece)

Ana Margarita Vijil Gurdián is a Nicaraguan lawyer, political leader and human rights activist. She is former president, from 2012 to 2017, of the Sandinista Renovation Movement (MRS) and a member of the Unamos party that succeeded the MRS. In June 2021, she was part of a wave of arrests of opposition figures, including seven aspiring opposition candidates for president in the 2021 Nicaraguan general election.

== Biography ==
After studying law at university, Vijil began her career working at the Central American University, then in The Hague on the territorial dispute between Nicaragua and Colombia. She left to join Herty Lewites' 2006 presidential campaign under the Sandinista Renovation Movement (MRS) banner, but Lewites died four months before the 2006 election and the FSLN's Daniel Ortega was elected.

From 2008 to 2010, Vijil was a Fulbright fellow, earning a master's in political science in Arizona in the United States.

From 2012 to 2017, Vijil was president of the MRS and after the government banned it, became a member of the successor party, Democratic Renovation Unity (Unamos).

In October 2018, following the protests that had broken out in April and the bloody government repression that ensued, Vijil was part of a sit-in on Camino de Oriente that led to her arrest when police shut down the demonstration; she was released the next day.

In June 2021 Vijil was part of a wave of arrests of opposition candidates for president and other opposition figures. She was arrested at her home on June 13, 2021, with former Sandinista commander Dora María Téllez, who is famous for her role in a 1978 raid to free 60 Sandinista political prisoners. Vijil's niece Tamara Dávila was arrested the night before. Like most of the others arrested, they are accused of violations of controversial Law 1055, passed in December 2020, which gives the government unilateral power to arrest anyone it designates as a "traitor to the homeland".

== See also ==
- Violeta Granera
- Cristiana Chamorro Barrios
- Victor Hugo Tinoco
- Hugo Torres Jiménez
