= Mónica Baltodano =

Nicaraguan politician

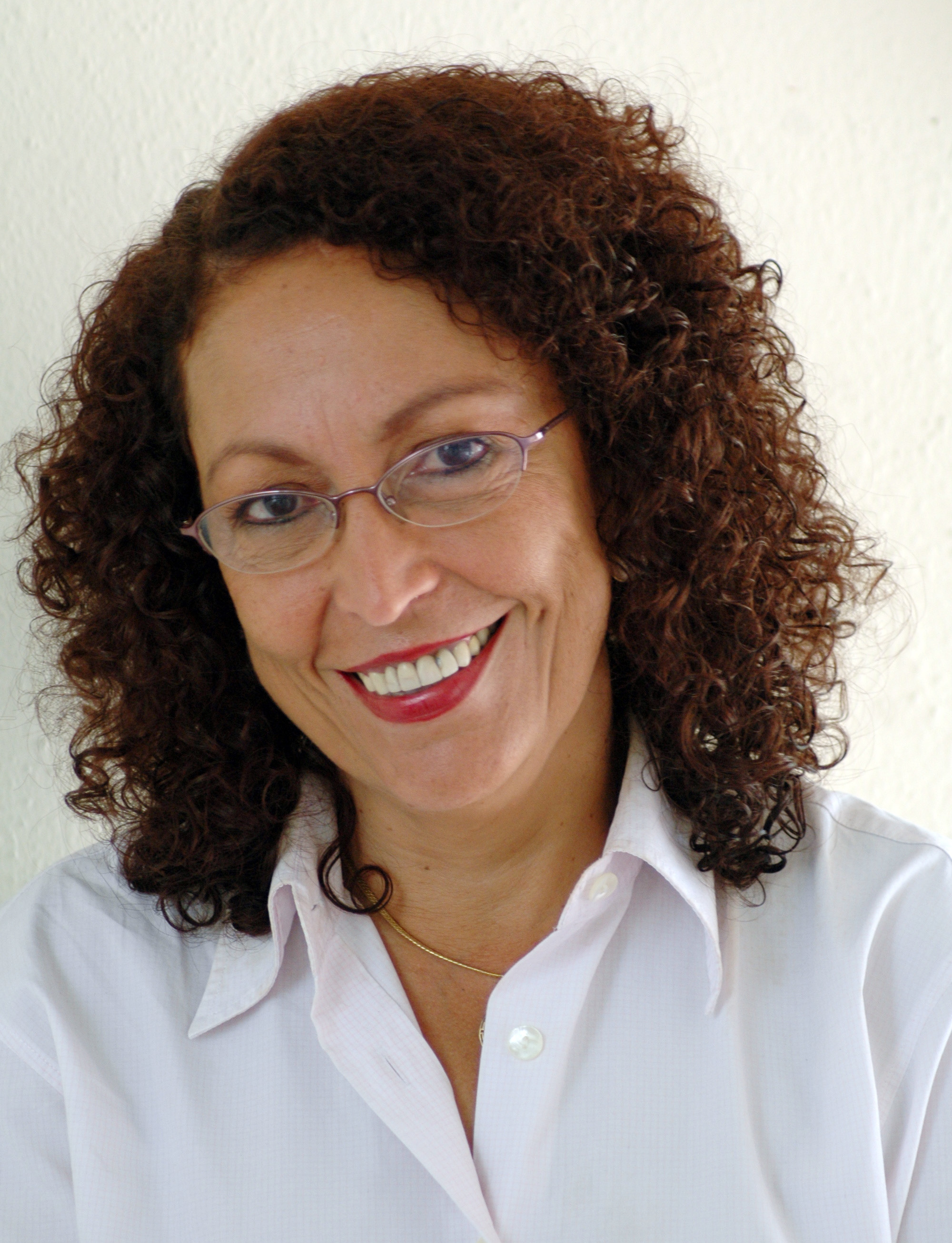
- Baltodano in 2006
- Movement: Sandinista National Liberation Front; Sandinista Renovation Movement
- Children: Monica Baltodano Lopez

Mónica Baltodano was a commander of the guerrilla revolutionary group known as the Sandinista National Liberation Front during the Nicaraguan Revolution. She worked in the movement for several decades, and after experiencing the corruption and authoritarianism within the movement, she left in 2005 to form the Sandinista Renovation Movement (Movimiento para la Renovación Sandinísta), known as El Rescate.

== Biography ==
Baltodano was born in Leon, Nicaragua on August 14, 1954. She is one of nine children, two boys and seven girls. Her father was a lawyer and her mother was a shop owner. She attended Catholic school in La Pureza with her six sisters while her two brothers studied in La Salle. Her family moved to Managua in 1972 when her mother split from her father due to what she saw as a lack of acceptance of her involvement in the war. All of Baltodano's siblings were revolutionaries as well, with her sister Alma losing her hands while building a contact bomb at age 15 and her sister Zulemita losing her life in a bombing at age 16. Baltodano has four children of her own, including environmental lawyer and activist Mónica López Baltodano.

== Political involvement ==
Baltodano became politically involved in high school when she worked on the campaign to free Doris Tijerino, a Sandinista revolutionary, from prison. She joined the Revolutionary Students Front, an armed group of young revolutionaries in 1972. Baltodano went underground with the Sandinista movement in 1974, compelled to action by the nation's declining political and economic conditions. In 1977 she was captured, arrested, and tortured for nine months while leading the North Front of the FSLN. After her release, she was put in charge of the capital, leading the movement's activities in Managua. By then a Guerrilla Commander, she led the final offensive of the revolution in 1979.

When the war ended, Baltodano took a more political role and was appointed Secretariat of Mass Organizations. In 1994 she was elected to the national directorate of the SNLF as part of a movement to increase women's representation at the highest levels of the SNLF; other women elected at the same time included Dorotea Wilson, Mirna Cunningham, Benigna Mendiola and Dora Maria Tellez. After several decades in the FSLN, Baltodano took issue with what she described as an authoritarian, vertical leadership style rife with corruption. Because of this, she left the party in 2005 to form the Movement to Rescue Sandinismo, known in Nicaragua as El Rescate.

In 2023, Mónica Baltodano was stripped of her Nicaraguan citizenship.

== Legacy ==
Baltodano was one of several FSLN women featured in the 2018 documentary ¡Las Sandinistas!.

In March 2022 she was amongst 151 international feminists signing Feminist Resistance Against War: A Manifesto, in solidarity with the Russian Feminist Anti-War Resistance. (Note: This manifesto was criticized by both Ukrainian feminists and members of the Feminist Anti-War Resistance themselves.)
