= Ernesto Leal =

Nicaraguan politician

Ernesto José Leal Sanchez (July 28, 1945 – December 26, 2005) was a Nicaraguan politician.

== Early life ==
Leal was born in Nicaragua's capital Managua. He became a civil engineer by profession, but was interested in politics since his youth. He graduated from the Universidad Centroamericana (UCA) in Nicaragua, and the Georgia Institute of Technology in Atlanta, Georgia.

In 1979 he supported the Sandinista revolution and became deputy Minister of Industry, but resigned in 1981 and became a critic of the government. He first married Carolina Medal and then second married Gioconda Padilla Godoy and had 3 children, Ernesto Leal Medal, Carolina Leal Medal, and Clarissa Leal Medal.

In 1990 he founded the Nicaraguan Democratic Movement and supported the election of President Violeta Chamorro. He served as deputy foreign minister in her government from 1990 to 1992 and as foreign minister of Nicaragua from 1992 to 1997. He was a strong supporter of stronger relations with other Central American countries.

In 2002, when Enrique Bolaños was elected president, Leal became one of his top aides, and became presidential chief of staff in November 2004. In 2005 he led government talks with leftist and rightest parties over constitutional changes that were to weaken the powers of the president.

== Death ==
Leal became ill with a rare case of pneumonia early in December 2005 and was sent to the United States for medical treatment. He spent three weeks at Mount Sinai Hospital in Miami, Florida but eventually died there of his illness.
