= Benigna Mendiola =

Nicaraguan socialist and revolutionary (born 1944)

- Born: 1944 (age 80–81); Nicaragua
- Occupations: Socialist, revolutionary and peasant leader
- Organization(s): Sandinista National Liberation Front (FSLN); Farmers and Ranchers Association
- Spouse: Bernandino Díaz Ochoa

Benigna Mendiola (born 1944) is a Nicaraguan socialist, revolutionary, peasant leader and member of the Sandinista National Liberation Front (Spanish: Frente Sandinista de Liberación Nacional, FSLN). She participated in guerrilla action against the Somoza dictatorships in Nicaragua and was elected to the national directorate of the FSLN in 1994.

== Biography ==
Mendiola was born in 1944 to a peasant family. Before the introduction of widespread education and local schooling in Nicaragua, she learned to read in her rural home.

Mendiola's partner was Bernandino Díaz Ochoa (1941–1971) [es]. Together, they operated as peasant leaders and organised the compañeras, known as "the Heroic Women of El Cuá," for guerrilla action against the Somoza dictatorships. She has testified to how women guerrillas were labelled as prostitutes. After the Somoza family was deposed by the Sandinistas in 1979, Mendiola remained a leader of workers the agricultural sector, becoming the head of the women's section of the Farmers and Ranchers Association.

Mendiola and Irela Prado were the only two women involved in the drafting of the 1987 Nicaraguan Constitution. In 1992, Mendiola called for peasant women to have access to land, titles, and loans.

As part of a movement to increase women's representation at the highest levels of the FSLN (with 30% of all positions in the party reserved for women) Mendiola was elected to the national directorate of the FSLN in 1994, alongside Monica Baltodano, Mirna Cunningham, Dora Maria Tellez and Dorotea Wilson. To facilitate their election, the directorate was enlarged from nine to fifteen members. She was nevertheless critical of the FSLN's Luisa Amanda Espinoza Association of Nicaraguan Women (Spanish: Asociación de Mujeres Nicaragüenses Luisa Amanda Espinoza, AMNLAE), including commenting on AMNLAE's "tendency to centralize" and "insensitivity to peasant women's realities." Mendiola later returned to working organising peasant farming women.

Mendiola's son Lenin Mendiola was shot to death in 2018 during a confrontation in Matagalpa between anti-government demonstrators and groups related to the Nicaraguan government.
