= Sergia Galván Ortega =

Dominican feminist activist

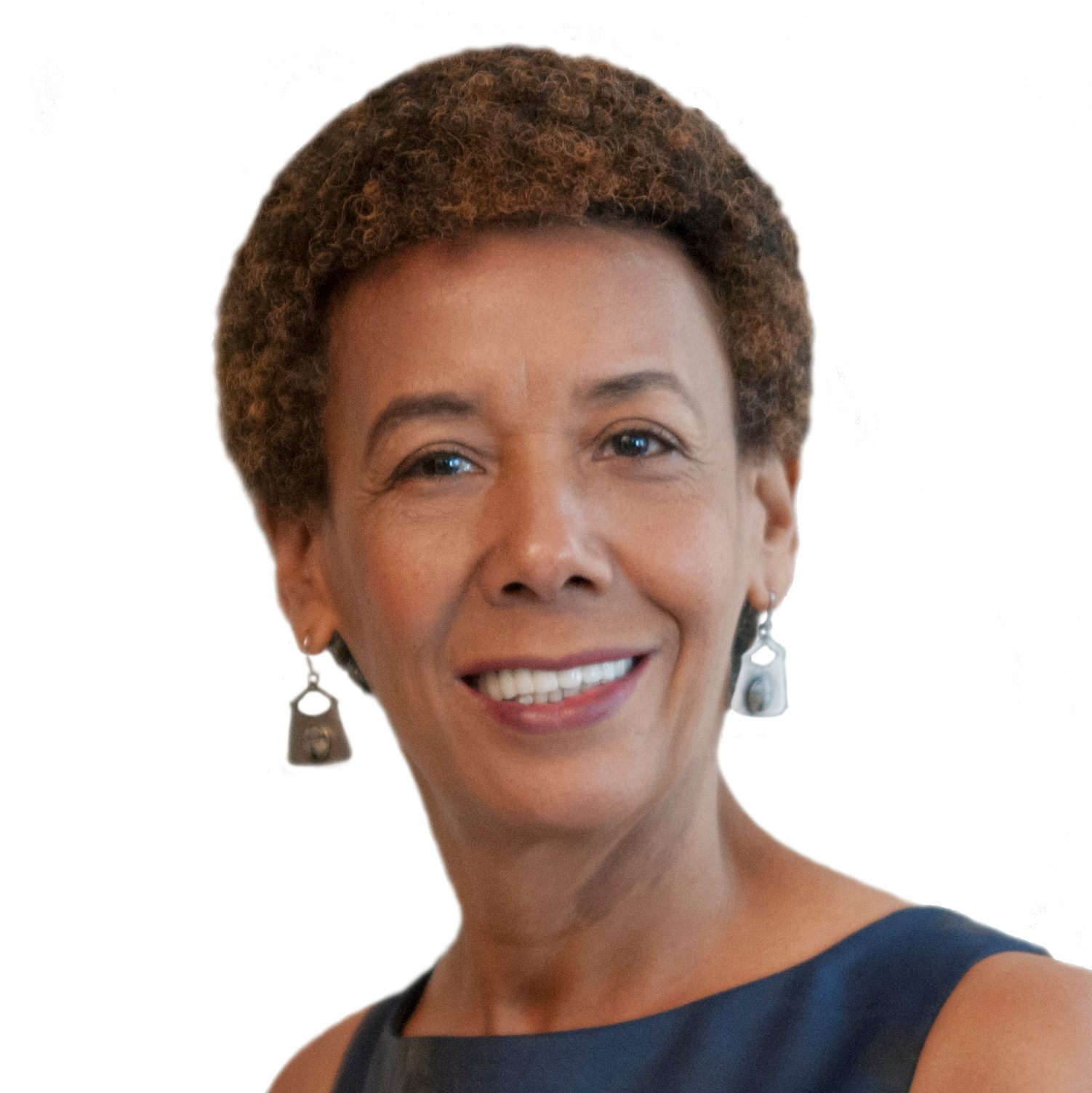
- Born: 1955 (age 70–71); Hato Mayor del Rey, Dominican Republic
- Occupations: Teacher, mental health counselor, activist

Sergia Galván Ortega (born 1955) is a Dominican feminist activist, teacher, and political advocate. She has been active in the feminist movement since 1979, and is a founder or co-founder of several national and international organisations. She is a founding member and party official of the Democratic Choice party.

== Early life ==
Galván was born in the provincial capital Hato Mayor del Rey, in the Dominican Republic.

== Feminist activism ==
In 1980, Galván worked with Accion Femenina Incorporada (AFI; ''Women's Action Incorporated''), a left-feminist organization that collaborates with the Mujeres Amas de Casa ("Women Housewives"). She was part of the delegation of Dominican women at the First Feminist Encounter of Latin America and the Caribbean, held in Bogotá, Colombia, in 1981.

In 1984, she joined the Dominican Center for Education Studies in the Women's Program. That same year, alongside other women's groups, she founded the Women and Health Collective (Colectiva Mujer y Salud), an organization focused on women's health and sexuality.

Between 1989 and 1992, Galván lived in Mexico, where she took Women's Studies courses at the Universidad Metropolitana and was employed at the Research Center of Latin America and the Caribbean (CIDAL; Centro de Investigación de América Latina y el Caribe).

Galván coordinated the first convention of Black Women in Latin America and the Caribbean, held in the Dominican Republic in 1992. She was a cofounder of the Network of Afro-Descendant Women of Latin America and the Caribbean (La Red de Mujeres Afrodescendientes de América Latina y Caribe) as well as the Movement for the Identity of Black Women (Movimiento por la identidad de la Mujer Negra) in the Dominican Republic.

Galván is a long-term advocate for abortion rights, and participated in a months-long protest in 2021 demanding the government of the Dominican Republic to include the three exceptions to the country's total ban on abortion (known as the tres causales) in the criminal code.

== International activism ==
Galván has been part of various international organizations and networks, including: the Women's Health Network of Latin America and the Caribbean (La Red de Salud de las Mujeres de América Latina y el Caribe), as part of its board of directors; the Caribbean Association for Feminist Research and Action (CAFRA; Red Feminista de Investigación y acción del Caribe); and the Latin American Committee for Women's Rights (CLADEM; El Comité de América Latina por los Derechos de las Mujeres.

In 2001, at a UN conference in South Africa, Galván - alongside Dorotea Wilson and Nirva Camacho - argued for greater recognition of the 150 million Afro-descendent people in Hispanophone countries.

Galván was the first Dominican member of the expert committee studying the implementation of the Belém do Pará Convention, also known as the "Inter-American Convention on the Prevention, Punishment, and Eradication of Violence against Women". She was also an alternate delegate before the Inter-American Commission of Women of the Organization of American States (OAS) in 2009, a member of the Women's Committee of Latin America and the Caribbean preparatory for the Human Rights Conference held in 1993 in Vienna, a member of the Women's Committee of Latin America and the Caribbean preparatory for the Beijing Conference held in 1995 in China, and a member of the international committee to follow up the Durban I World Conference against Racism 2001, which first met in 2003.

In 2023, she joined the Board of Directors of Ipas, a reproductive health nonprofit focused on access to abortion and contraception.

== Political career ==
In 2015, Galván joined professor and politician Minou Tavárez Mirabal in forming the Democratic Choice party. Within the party she is a member of the Political Directorate and leads the Secretariat for Women. She was a candidate for deputy by Circumscription No. 1 of the National District in the 2016 Minou Coalition, in box No. 23 of the Alliance for Democracy APD, but was not elected.

In 2021, she confirmed that she had served as a technical advisor to the Dominican Republic Ministry of Women.

== See also ==
- Ochy Curiel
