= Protests against Daniel Ortega =

2014–2021 protests in Nicaragua

- Part of Protests against democratic backsliding
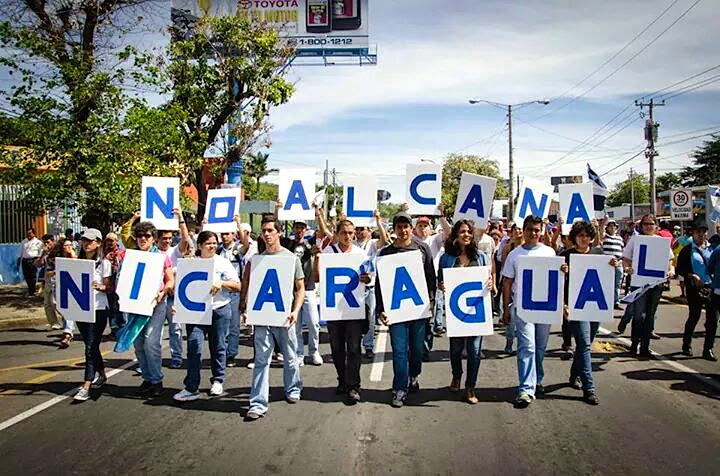
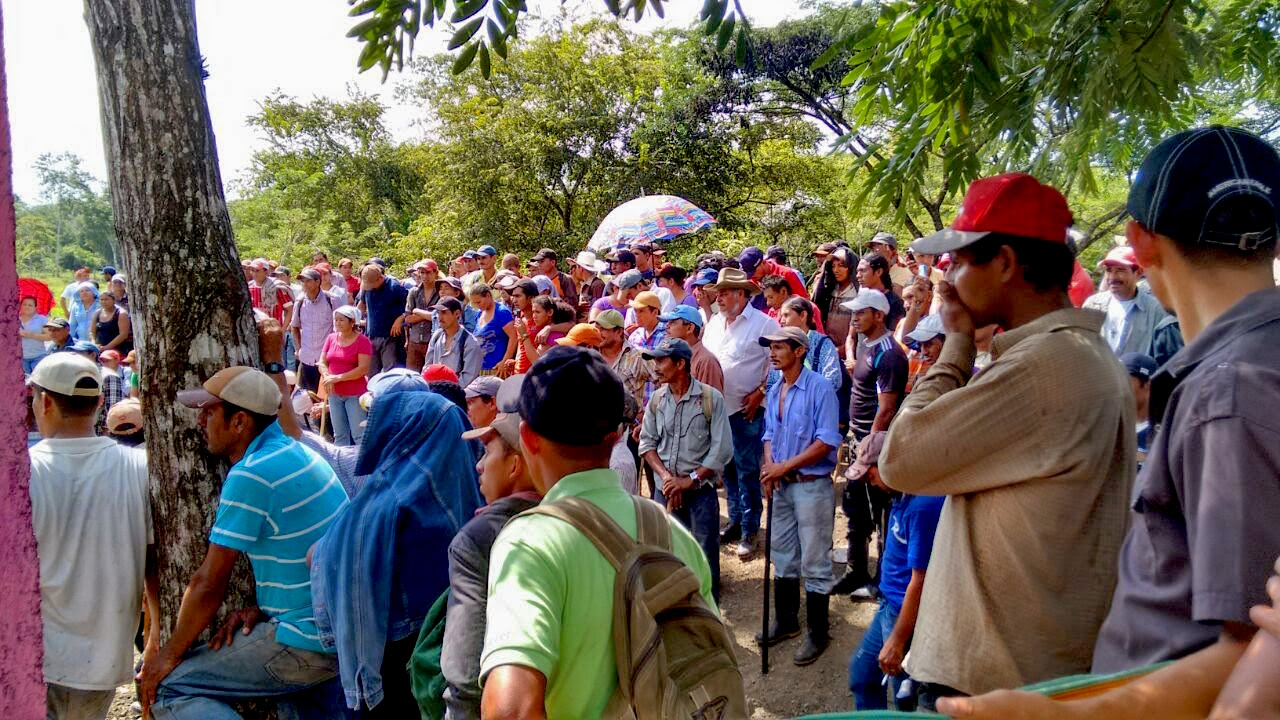
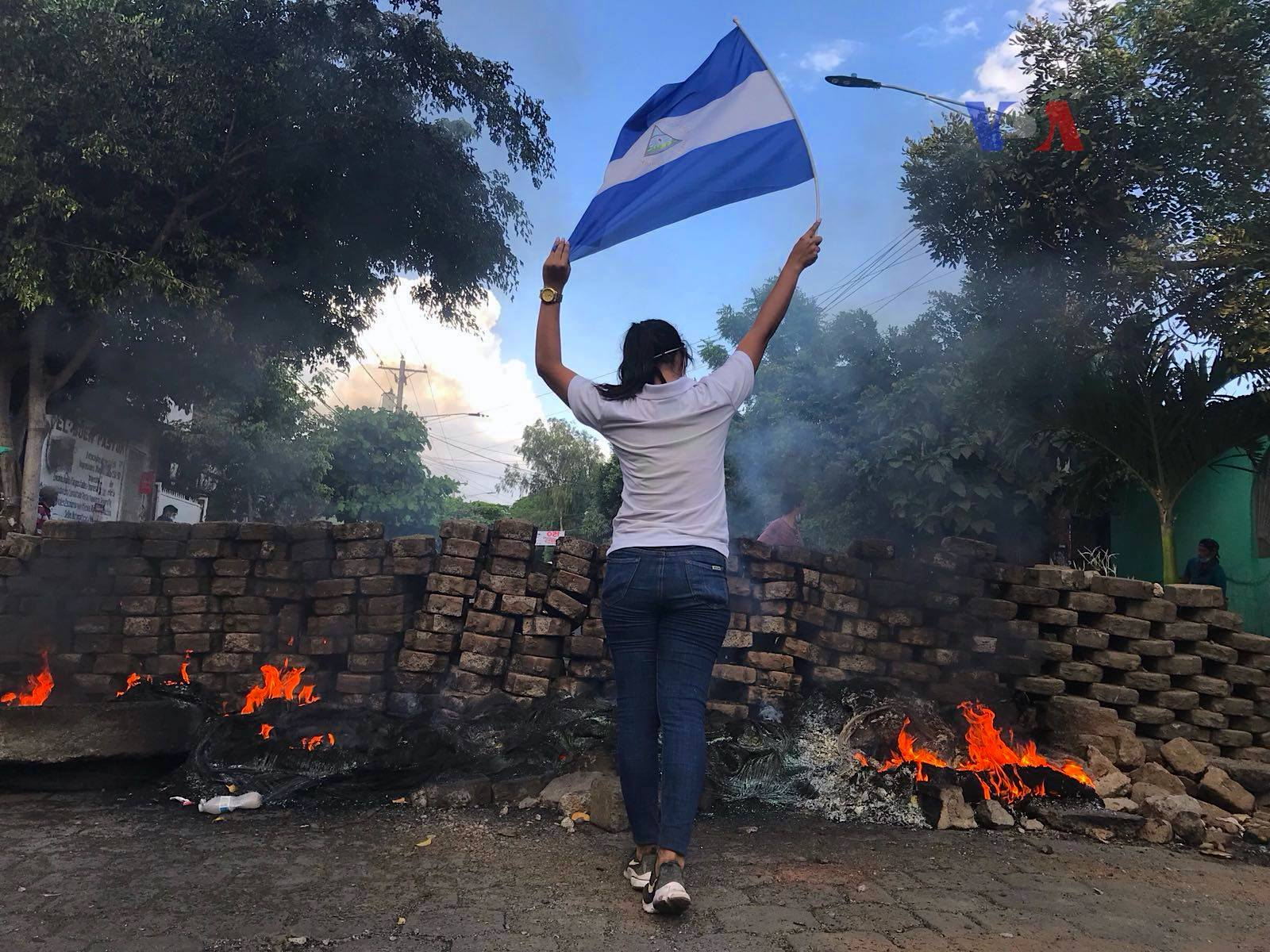
- List: Protesters gathered on 10 December 2014 denouncing the Nicaraguan Canal. Campesinos gathered in El Tule on 23 December 2014. A woman holding a Nicaraguan national flag near a burning barricade on 20 April 2018.
- Date: 24 December 2014 – 31 December 2021 (7 years and 1 week)
- Location: Nicaragua
- Caused by: Democratic deficit, political repression, social security, environmental protection, Nicaragua Canal proposal
- Goals: Democratic elections and end of political violence; Acceptable pensions and stop of the Nicaragua Canal
- Result: Reduced pension for small contributors; Cancellation of social reforms; Nicaragua Canal construction has not started

Parties
(Nicaragua) Opposition: Independent Liberal Party; Sandinista Renovation Movement; Civil society: Students; Campesinos; Private sector; Superior Council for Private Enterprise (since April 2018)	Government of Nicaragua: National Police; Sandinista National Liberation Front: Sandinista Youth

Lead figures
Ana Margarita Vijil; José Adán Aguerri; Fabio Gadea Mantilla; Maximino Rodríguez Martínez; Walter Espinoza; Suyén Barahona; Juan Sebastián Chamorro; Cristiana Chamorro Barrios; Tamara Dávila; Octavio Ortega; Lesther Alemán	(Nicaragua) Daniel Ortega; (Nicaragua) Rosario Murillo

Number
Hundreds of thousands	

Casualties
- Deaths: 2 (2014) · 325–568 (2018)
- Injuries: 20+ (2014) · 433 (2018)
- Arrested: 47 (2014) · 200+ (2018)

Protests against Daniel Ortega, Co-president of Nicaragua (Note: Co-president since 18 February 2025. Ortega served as president from 1985 to 1990 and from 2007 to 2025.), began in 2014, when the construction of the Nicaragua Canal was about to begin, and several hundred protesters blocked roads and clashed with police during the groundbreaking of the canal. Tens of thousands of Nicaraguans began to protest against Ortega for what they believe to be a corrupt electoral system.

The protests were renewed in April 2018 following the Ortega administration's decree of the Nicaraguan Social Security Institute's social security reform increasing taxes and decreasing benefits. Police and the paramilitary groups attacked and killed unarmed protesters, which made people to stand-up. After five days of deadly unrest, Ortega announced the cancellation of the reforms. Since then, Ortega faced the largest protests in his government's history, with the protest movement spreading to denounce Ortega in general and demanding his resignation. Related protests continue to the present day.

In regard to changes regarding protests: Assembly rights since 2018 have been limited and restricted. However, it was not until 2021 that an actual law was passed that fully limited the right to assembly. In September 2021, the Supreme Electoral Council, which was filled with members of the FSLN political party, “prohibited in-person rallies of more than 200 attendees for campaigning purposes.” The Council argued that they created this law due to the fear of COVID-19 spreading. Thus, during the 2021 elections, a very limited number of protests occurred due to this law. As a result, many who protested the elections were Nicaraguans outside of the country.

== Background ==
In 2014, Steven Levitsky of Harvard University stated: "Only under the dictatorships of the past ... were presidents reelected for life", with Levitsky further saying that while Latin America experienced democracy, citizens opposed "indefinite reelection, because of the dictatorships of the past." About Nicaragua, Levitsky stated: "In Nicaragua ... reelection is associated with the same problems of 100 years ago." That same year, The Washington Post stated that "Daniel Ortega of Nicaragua ... used the ballot box to weaken or eliminate term limits."

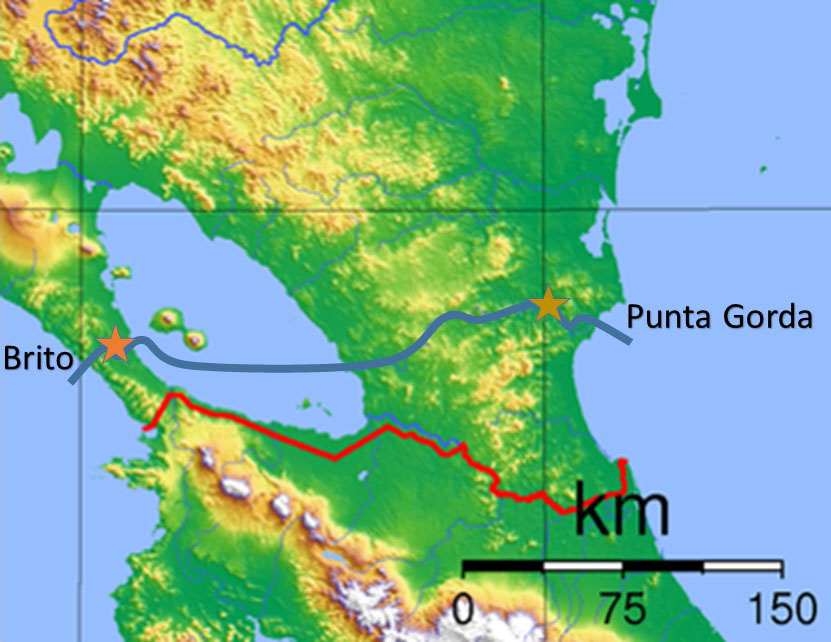
The proposed Nicaragua Canal, seen here in blue

Early in Ortega's presidency, he allied with Venezuelan President Hugo Chávez and his regional block which provided $500 million in oil subsidies annually to Ortega's government. Critics stated that the subsidies worked as a slush fund and helped Ortega maintain political strength. Going into the 2010s, Venezuela began to experience economic difficulties. On 15 June 2013, Ortega announced that his government was partnering with Chinese billionaire Wang Jing to construct the Nicaraguan Canal, a plan to construct a canal through Lake Nicaragua and the surrounding area that the Nicaraguan government claimed would benefit the economy of the country. Sergio Ramírez, a former vice president of Ortega, "suspected Ortega of using the canal to keep himself in office and also, possibly, to enrich himself", with Ramírez stating that "Ortega wants to make it appear that his tenure in power is indispensable in order to consummate this long-term project."

According to the Business-Anti-Corruption Portal, corruption among political circles within the Nicaraguan government "impairs the functioning of state institutions and limits foreign investment", while multinational companies "report widespread favouritism and impunity among public officials." The Business Anti-Corruption Portal added that "[t]he protection of property rights is weak due to public authorities' failure to enforce court orders." Many campesinos near the canal's path began to protest against Ortega and the plan due to the Chinese firm's ability to expropriate their land, possibly displacing over 100,000 Nicaraguans. Such expropriations were granted by Ortega's government in 2013 after only three hours of debate, allowing HKND, the developer of the canal, power to confiscate any property it needs in Nicaragua. Some Nicaraguans believed that Ortega gave up Nicaragua's sovereignty and environment to the Chinese, with one newspaper reminding Nicaraguans that in 2007, Ortega stated that he would not risk Lake Nicaragua's stability "for all the gold in the world."

== Timeline of events ==
=== 2014 ===
==== December ====
Protests began on 24 December 2014 with clashes ensuing, with campesino protesters being arrested and allegedly beaten by Nicaraguan authorities, with 47 of the protesters and their leaders being arrested. It was reported that the government was searching each home in the area to find those who participated in the protests. On 26 December, protesters demonstrated outside of El Chipote Prison and were confronted by Sandinista Youth on motorcycles, with some protesters being released later that day. On 30 December 6 of the campesino leaders were released from El Chipote Prison.

Members of the Independent Liberal Party also began protesting every Wednesday demanding electoral law reforms. According to Nicaraguan sociologist Manuel Ortega Hegg, the protests against Ortega "involve a wider range of groups, like campesinos" who were formally allied with Ortega, along with "many who are sympathetic to the government", noting that those who are demonstrating are from "beyond political parties." He further states that since Nicaraguans were left out of the dialogue, that "their only recourse is to take to the streets."

=== 2015 ===
==== January ====
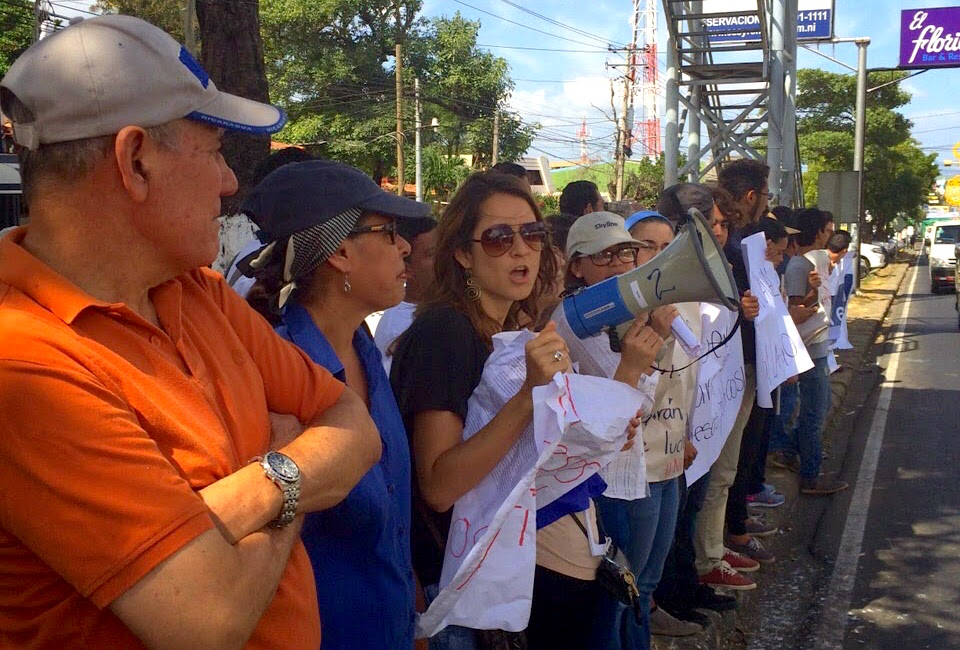
Protesters demanding freedom of the press on 29 January 2015

In Ometepe, residents greeted a Nicaraguan government medical team with a banner that read "Traitor Ortega, no more lies", with activists in the area stating that the medical team only wanted their identification numbers so they could show that "you're in favor of the canal."

==== June ====
On 14 June, thousands of Nicaraguans protested with about 15,000 and 30,000 demonstrating in Juigalpa. The protest consisted mostly of "peasants" with organizers surprised that the number of protesters was larger than the 10,000 they had anticipated.

==== July ====
On 8 July, about 200 protesters in Managua demonstrated against what they called electoral rules that "favours Ortega's Sandinista party." Clashes then erupted between authorities and protesters when protesters grew close to the electoral offices, with police beating protesters and journalists, breaking one Associated Press photographer's camera lens. About nine lawmakers from the Independent Liberal Party were also arrested and later released. On 15 July, the weekly protest in Managua was attended by about 300 protesters, with not only the Independent Liberal Party participating but members of the Sandinista Renovation Movement, among others upset with government actions. Multiple buses full of protesters destined to participate at the protest were also stopped by Nicaraguan authorities, with some individuals being temporarily detained.

=== 2016 ===
According to the Economist Intelligence Unit in their August 2016 Nicaragua: Country Outlook report, "management of rural protests, particularly those related to nascent plans for a transoceanic canal, have damaged his support, and complaints about a lack of accountability and transparency in government will intensify."

==== January ====
The 56th protest occurred on 9 January, with hundreds of farmers gathered in La Fonseca, demanding that Law 840, the law that granted the construction of the Nicaragua Canal, be revoked. The collection of signatures representing the dissatisfaction with the canal also took place during the demonstrations.

==== April ====
On 22 April, thousands of Nicaraguans protested in Managua, with Jose Chavarria, a farmers group leader, stating that protesters would continue to fight the Nicaragua Canal.

==== June ====
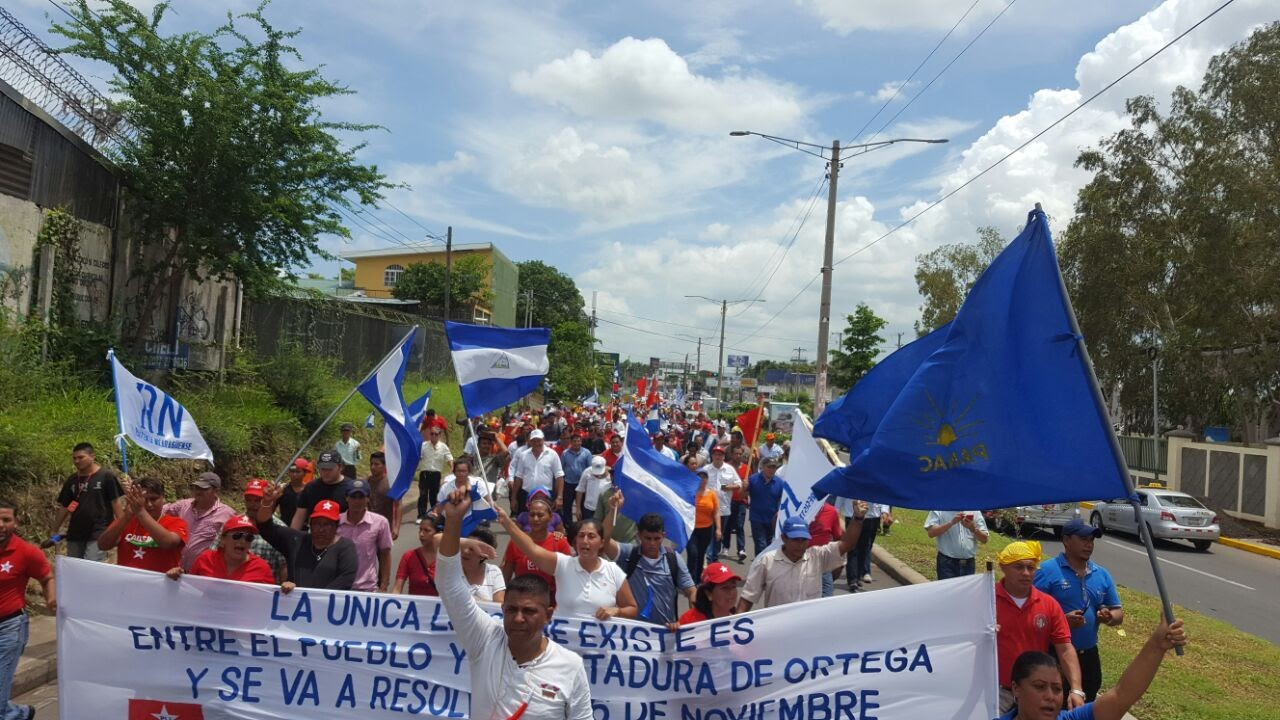
A protest in Managua, Nicaragua, on 11 June 2016

Two United States diplomats and a professor were expelled from Nicaragua on 14 June due to their studies on the canal, with Ortega stating, "Our government has been forced to remove two people who, being United States government officials with official passports, carried out in Nicaragua without the knowledge of or coordination with our authorities tasks that are the purview of the Nicaraguan government."

On 25 June, five foreign activists were deported for alleged possession of explosives after a small fire occurred at a home that was teaching about wood stoves.

The United States government then issued a travel warning to its own visitors on 29 June due to the Nicaraguan government's reactions to protest, which included the deportation and expulsion of foreign visitors.

==== November ====
On 29 November 2016, a protest destined to the capital city of Managua was met with roadblocks from Nicaraguan authorities. At the starting point 300 kilometres (190 mi) from Managua in Nueva Guinea, protests turned to clashes resulting in eleven injured.

=== 2017 ===
==== August ====
The National Council in Defence of our Land organized the 91st protest against the construction of the canal, which would affect thousands of people. For a couple of hours on August 15, police stopped protesters from arriving on buses to a march taking place in La Froncesa, a bay created on the borders of El Salvador, Honduras, and Nicaragua. Bianca Jagger, a renowned human rights defender, was also present during the protest. The Americas Director at Amnesty International, Erika Guevara-Rosas, stated “Once again, the Nicaraguan police have violated people’s right to peaceful protest. These kinds of actions are, quite simply, acts of intimidation designed to suppress any expression of disagreement with the policies of Daniel Ortega’s government.” The police have a history of oppressing citizens' rights to protest peacefully; they block roads and restrict access to transport when communities organize protests.

==== April ====
Police in the city of Juigalpa east of Managua prevented vehicles involved in protests from traveling on 22 April 2017, with at least 20 protesters arrested.

=== 2018 ===
==== February ====
By February 2018, many analysts viewed the canal project as defunct, with the main investor having lost much of his fortune in the 2015–2016 economic crisis, and other Chinese investment having turned to focus on Panama, the Nicaragua project's main competitor. Nonetheless, the head of the canal authority in Nicaragua insisted work on the project was slow due to the project's size but still on-going. The Chinese company that had been granted the concession for the canal maintains legal rights to it and to side projects in the country, short of a 60% vote to revoke the legislation. As of August 2019, the project remained in a state of limbo.

==== April ====
Anti-riot police outside the National University of Engineering in Managua on 19 April 2018

On 16 April 2018, demonstrators marched in the capital of Managua to protest what they regarded as an insufficient government response to forest fires that burned 5,500 hectares (13,600 acres) of the Indio Maiz Biological Reserve, a tropical nature preserve that is home to Rama and Kriol indigenous people, as well as significant biodiversity and endangered species. Counterprotests supported the Sandinista Front government.

On Wednesday, 18 April, protests in the capital expanded in response to the Ortega and Murillo administration announcement of social security reforms that raised income and payroll taxes while reducing pension benefits by 5%. Demonstrations also emerged in six more cities, meeting with heavy response from authorities following the deployment of the Nicaraguan Army to respond to protesters ordered by Ortega. At least 26 people were killed, including journalist Angel Gahona of the news program Meridiano, with Gahona being shot to death outside of city hall in Bluefields while streaming on Facebook Live. Reports also emerged that various forms of independent media were censored during the protests.

On Saturday 21 April, Ortega made his first public appearance, announcing he would hold negotiations for possible revision of the reforms, planned to take effect 1 July; however, he said he would only meet with business leaders, and alleged that demonstrators were being manipulated by gangs and other political interests. Demonstrations increased in response, with protestors objecting to the repression of demonstrations and the exclusion of other sectors from the negotiations, as well as the reforms themselves. The business chamber Cosep announced it would only participate in the negotiation if police violence ceased, detained protestors were released and free speech was restored. Nicaragua's Roman Catholic Conference of Bishops also called for an end to the police violence and criticized unilateral reforms; Pope Francis subsequently added his call for peace in the country.

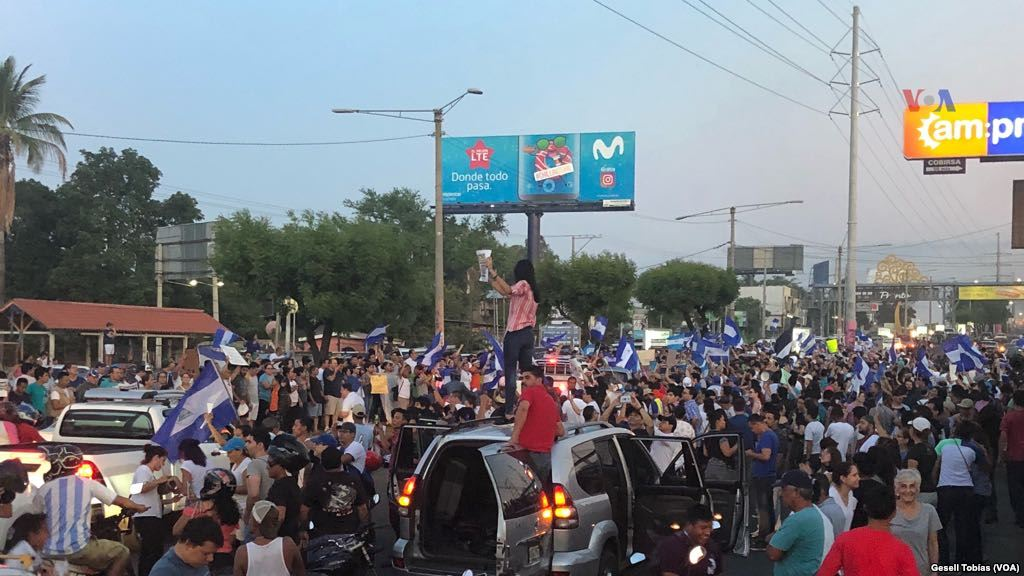
Crowds of protesters in Managua on 24 April 2018

On Sunday, 22 April, as press described the unrest as the biggest crisis of Ortega's presidency, Ortega announced the cancellation of the social security reforms, acknowledging they were not viable and had created a "dramatic situation." He again proposed negotiations on the issue, this time to include Catholic Cardinal Leopoldo Brenes as well as the business community.

On Monday, 23 April, marches of citizens, businessmen and students were presented in Managua demanding the end of violence in the country as well as the release of students arrested by the police and the cessation of censorship of television media, in addition to ask for a response from the government about the students who died during the protests. The protests were the largest seen during the Ortega administration, with tens of thousands of Nicaraguans participating and calling for the resignation of Ortega.

On 24 April, over 200 detainees were released by Nicaraguan authorities. This was the result of dialogue between the government and other organizations.

By 26 April, it was reported that at least 63 people were killed, mostly by bullet wounds, with more than 160 injured by gunfire.

=== 2019 ===
Police arrested 107 protestors at march in Managua on 16 March 2019.

The Nicaraguan Ministry of the Interior reported the death of the 57-year-old political prisoner Eddy Antonio Montes Praslin due to a shot by a prison guard when they "allegedly" controlled a riot, the events happened during a visit of the International Red Cross . The death of this prisoner provoked protests at the head of the La Modelo Prison by relatives of political prisoners who want to know about the physical state of the detainees from the Sandinista government.

On 11 June 2019, several political prisoners were released. Among them were the journalists Miguel Mora Barberena and Lucía Pineda Ubau, the peasant leader Medardo Mairena and the student leader Edwin Carcache.

On Sunday 16 June 2019, after a thanksgiving Mass for the release of political prisoners in the Managua Cathedral, there was a protest on the grounds of that temple which was attacked by the police with tear gas and rubber bullets. The protesters took refuge behind the perimeter wall of the cathedral.

=== 2021 ===
==== November ====
On November 7th, preliminary results for the upcoming presidential elections were released, leading to mass protests in cities worldwide. According to the results, Ortega won a fourth term and would take office on January 10, 2022. The elections were filled with arbitrary arrests of journalists and activists, in addition to coercion, acts of harassment, and overall political violence.

In response to the repression, the Americas Director at Amnesty International, Erika Guevara-Rosas, stated that “Once again, the people of Nicaragua find themselves in a situation where voicing criticism of the government puts them at grave risk. In the last few years, we’ve witnessed first-hand the plot of a horror thriller developing in the country, where deadly police repression, wrongful imprisonment, ill-treatment, harassment and criminalization of human rights defenders and journalists are common practices, all of them endorsed by a judiciary without independence and a National Assembly that exists only to rubber stamp Daniel Ortega’s repressive agenda.”

Due to the fear that many citizens felt, several civil society movements and organizations in Nicaragua urged citizens to boycott the election and encouraged protests in other countries. As a result, the media reported an overall low voter turnout. In addition, there were mass demonstrations in other countries.

One of these protests was in Madrid, Spain, on November 5. Two days prior to the elections in Nicaragua, Ortega’s government arrested and jailed seven opposition members. The Nicaraguan community in Madrid mobilized in order to protest the fraudulent election organized by the government. The SOS Nicaragua Madrid association organized a sit-in on Sunday, November 7, in front of the Spanish Congress. The members of the associations wanted to denounce the elections, the repression that the Nicaraguan people have suffered under Ortega’s government, and the imprisonment of the opposition members. Ortega stated that he would start a national dialogue once the election was over. However, the Nicaraguan community in Spain did not trust him and believed that the situation would not change. A young Nicaraguan journalist in Spain, who wanted to remain anonymous for safety reasons, stated that “Everything is already designed for him to win, the imprisonment of the seven candidates is proof of that." In addition, Rayid Alvarado, a Nicaraguan lawyer, believed that “the current prosecution of opponents and anti-government protesters is driven by ‘Ortega’s fear that Nicaraguans will go out into the streets again, that we will express ourselves again. He is afraid of leaving power because he already knows that he will not return.’” The people, both outside and inside of Nicaragua, do not believe that the nation will change and that their rights and freedoms will continue to be hindered.

=== 2026 ===
"There is a realistic possibility of protests in Nicaragua, despite the de facto protest ban", according to a media outlet (on 23 July 2026).

== See also ==
- 2018 Nicaraguan protests
- List of protests in the 21st century
