= Myrna Cunningham =

Nicaraguan activist

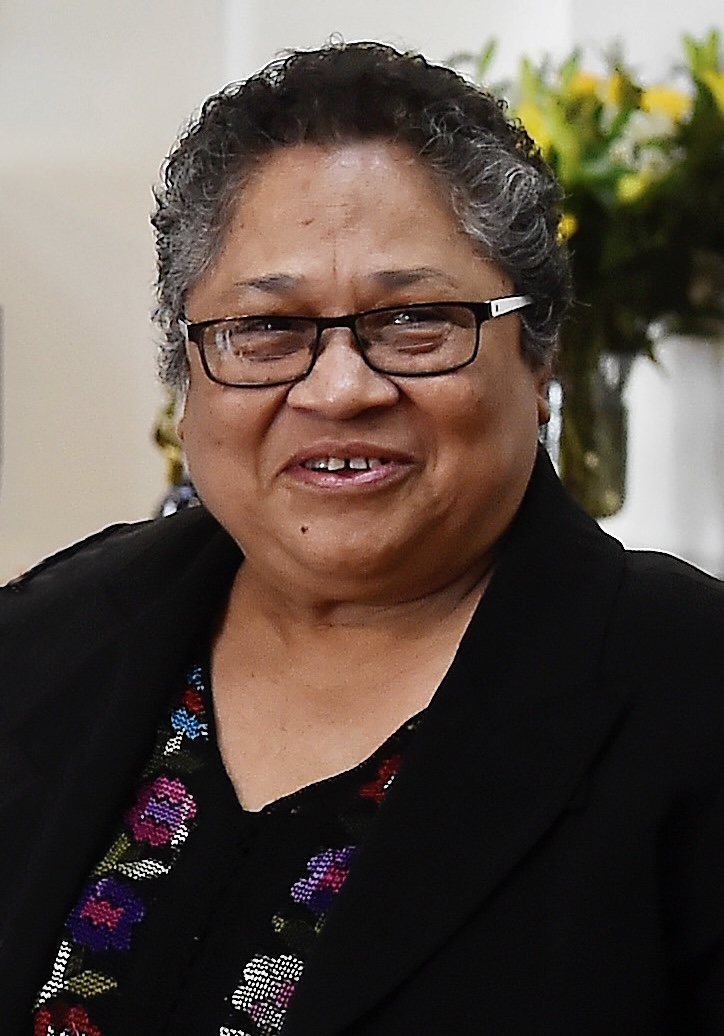
- Born: 10 November 1947; Bilwaskarma

Myrna Kay Cunningham kain is a Miskito feminist, indigenous rights activist and medical surgeon from Nicaragua. She has participated in political-social processes linked to the struggle for the rights of women and indigenous peoples in Latin America. She has been coordinator of the Indigenous Chair of the Intercultural Indigenous University.

In September 2010, she obtained an Honoris Causa Doctorate from the National Autonomous University of Mexico, the first time that the UNAM granted such recognition to an indigenous woman. From 2011 to 2013, she was chair of the Permanent Forum on Indigenous Issues of the UN. She served as the chairperson of the United Nations Permanent Forum on Indigenous Issues until 2012.

She is also the president of the Association for Women's Rights in Development (AWID) where she works to advance the rights of indigenous women and knowledge on indigenous peoples and the impacts of climate change, serving as FAO Special Ambassador for the International Year of Family Farming, adviser to the president of the UN World Conference of Indigenous People, and on boards of the Global Fund for Women, Permanent UN Forum on Indigenous Issues, the Association for Women's Rights in Development (AWID), and The Hunger Project.

She is currently chairperson of the Center for Autonomy and Development of Indigenous People (CADPI) and vice president of the board of the Latin American and Caribbean Indigenous People Development Fund.

== Career ==
=== Early career ===
Cunningham first studied to be a primary school teacher and she worked as a teacher within her Waspam community in northeast of Nicaragua along Coco River at the border with Honduras. After several years, she went back to school to study medicine at the National Autonomous University of Nicaragua at León (UNAN-León), and she became the first Miskito doctor in Nicaragua. After completing her studies she returned to the Miskito region where she started to work as a general practitioner and later as a surgeon. She was active with work in public health within the Waspam community until 1979. During the Sandinista Revolution, she worked in the Ministry of Public Health, including in the role of Director of investigation and planning. After the revolution she returned again to the Miskito region where she became the first woman governor of the autonomous region.

She helped to negotiate some of the peace agreements after the conflict in Nicaragua, setting the stage for the Law of Autonomy of the Indigenous Peoples and Ethnic Communities from the Atlantic Coast of Nicaragua in 1987. She also helped to create the first autonomous regional government. She served as the Deputy of the Autonomous Region of the North Atlantic Coast in the National Assembly RAAN. During this period, the first normative instruments for the institutionalization of the multi-ethnic regional system in Nicaragua were defined.

=== Indigenous communities, education, and rights ===
In 1992 she was the coordinator of the Continental Campaign of indigenous, black and popular resistance and she has been an activist for the individual and collective rights of women and men of indigenous peoples in her country, for the Organization of American States (OAS) and the United Nations (UN). She has been a promoter before international cooperation agencies in the search for funds and development of an external cooperation culturally respectful with indigenous peoples and has worked on intercultural health issues and traditional medicine, in addition to continuing to collaborate with the Autonomous Regional Governments of Nicaragua in the process of establishing Intercultural Health Models. Cunningham has been active for international agencies to search for funds which promote external cooperation with indigenous peoples and she has worked on intercultural health issues and traditional medicine to establishing Intercultural Health Models.

In 1994, Cunningham founded the University of the Autonomous Regions of the Nicaraguan Caribbean Coast, one of the first higher education for indigenous people, which has become a model for the continent. Simultaneously, she worked as promoter for Regional Autonomous Education System (Sistema Educativo Autonómico Regional - SEAR).

She was the president of the Center for the Autonomy and Development of Indigenous Peoples (Centro para la Autonomía y Desarollo de los Pueblos Indígenas - CADPI), an organization that works in the areas of intercultural communication, cultural revitalization, indigenous women's rights, climate change and its impact on indigenous peoples. She also established an observatory of regional multi-ethnic autonomy in Nicaragua.

From 2011 to 2013, she was chair of the United Nations Permanent Forum on Indigenous Issues.

In 2014, she advised the president of the United Nations General Assembly for the Conference of Indigenous Peoples of the UN.

She is currently president of the Permanent Forum on Indigenous Issues with the UN, and board member with Women's Rights and Development (AWID). For the Tropical Agricultural Research and the Center for Higher Education she works on the projects to fight hunger and famine and supports a trust fund for Indigenous Peoples. CunninghamCunningham is also the first vice president of the board of directors of the fund for the development of indigenous peoples of Latin America and the Caribbean.

=== Women's rights ===
Cunningham is active in defense of women's rights and specifically the rights of indigenous women both in her country and in the continental and global context. She is a member of the board of directors of the Global Fund for Women and advisor to the Alliance of Indigenous Women of Mexico and Central America, the Continental Liaison for Indigenous Women and the International Forum of Indigenous Women (Foro International de Mujeres Indigenas - FIMI).

In 1994 she was elected to the national directorate of the SNLF as part of a movement to increase women's representation at the highest levels of the SNLF; other women elected at the same time included Dorotea Wilson, Mónica Baltodano, Benigna Mendiola and Dora Maria Tellez.

=== Recent work ===
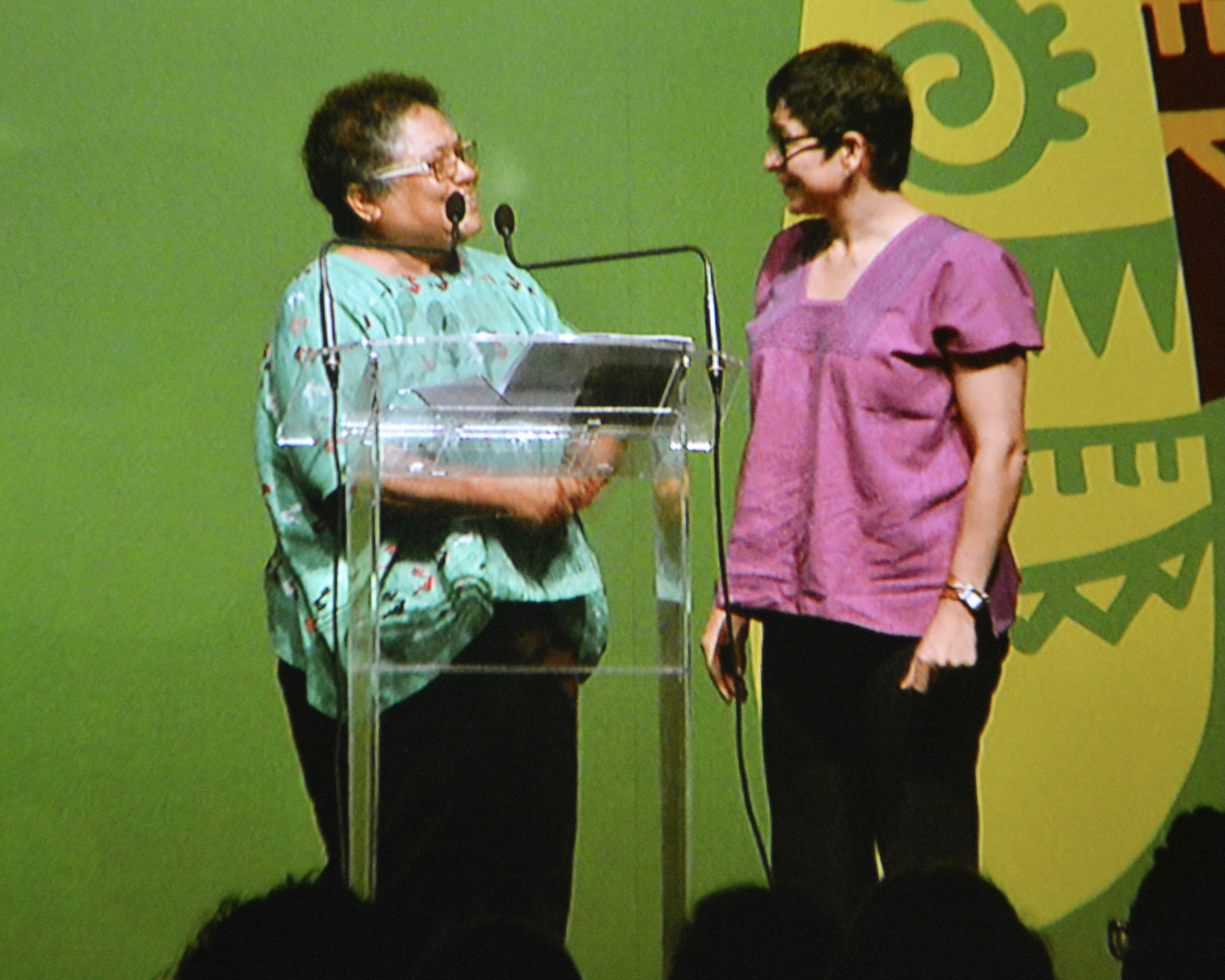
Cunningham accepting an award from Lydia Alpizar Duranin of the Association for Women's Rights in Development in 2016

In 2010, the National Autonomous University of Mexico (UNAM), awarded Cunningham an honorary doctorate. She was the first indigenous woman to receive an honorary degree from UNAM.

Cunningham was a member of the Board of Directors of the Global Fund for Women and also advised the Alliance of Indigenous Women of Mexico and Central America, the Continental Network of Indigenous Women and the International Indigenous Women's Forum.

In 2012, the human rights organization MADRE awarded Cunningham with the Woman of Distinction Award.
