= Dorotea Wilson =

Nicaraguan woman rights activist

Member of the National Directorate of the Sandinista National Liberation Front
- In office 1994–1998
- Constituency: North Caribbean Coast Autonomous Region

Personal details
- Born: 1948 (age 77–78) Puerto Cabezas, Nicaragua
- Party: Sandinista National Liberation Front
- Education: Central American University

Dorotea Wilson Tathum (born 1948) is a Nicaraguan politician and women's rights activist. She was a congresswoman and member of the Sandinista National Liberation Front (FSLN). She has founded and co-founded a wide range of organisations that raise awareness of the rights of women and black people in Nicaragua, including the Nicaraguan Women's Forum and the Summit of Afro-descendant Women Leaders of the Americas (2015), amongst others. In 2011, she was awarded the International Prize for Equality and Non-Discrimination awarded by the National Council to Prevent Discrimination.

== Early life and education ==
Born in Puerto Cabezas in 1948, Wilson is of African descent; she is one of 9 siblings. Her father worked in the region's gold mines, and her mother sold pastries to local timber workers. At the age of 12, her parents separated and shortly afterwards she was taken into the care of her father. She attended Catholic schools: Santa Inés College and Maryknoll College. Later, she would join a Catholic religious congregation and took religious orders to become a nun for nine years, from the ages of 19 to 28—despite being initially brought up in the Moravian Church by her parents. Wilson has an MSc in Gender and Development from the Central American University.

== Career ==
In 1975, she joined a guerrilla organisation which was part of the Sandinista National Liberation Front (FSLN). Wilson's political activities were a violation of her vows as a nun, so she chose to renounce them and leave the convent. In this, she was influenced by her religious beliefs, particularly those related to supporting the poor and social justice.

In 1986, whilst serving as a FSLN congresswoman, during the 1986 constitutional debates, Wilson argued for a reconsideration of Nicaraguan identity beyond an acceptance that all were mestizo, rather she wanted recognition of diversity, for example for Afro-descendant communities, stating that "unity is possible within diversity". Wilson was also a key voice in the drafting of the Statute of Autonomy (Law 28), which was legislated in 1987, and brokered peace between the FSLN and other guerrilla groups on the coast who were fighting to retain autonomy.

In 1990 she was elected to the Autonomous Regional Council of the North Caribbean Coast Autonomous Region, and in 1994 she was elected to the national directorate of the FSLN with a brief to focus on women's rights. This led to substantial reform within the FSLN. Her election was part of a movement to increase women's representation at the highest levels of the FSLN; other women elected at the same time included Monica Baltodano, Mirna Cunningham, Benigna Mendiola and Dora Maria Tellez. She has spoken out over how her involvement with the FSLN led to the awakening of her Afro-Nicaraguan identity.

After Wilson's term on the FSLN directorate came to an end in 1998, she moved on to focus on work with women's rights organisations. This led to her cofounding the Nicaraguan Women's Forum and serving on its board, and has been a member of the Women's Network Against Violence (WNAV). In 2001, at a UN conference in South Africa, Wilson, alongside Sergia Galvan and Nirva Camacho, argued for greater recognition of the 150 million Afro-descendent people in Hispanophone countries.

In 2015, she organized the first Summit of Afro-descendant Women Leaders of the Americas, which took place from 26–28 June in Managua, Nicaragua. In her opening speech, she referred to the limitations faced by Afro-descendant women in Latin America, the Caribbean and the Diaspora. She stated that there are still gender gaps, but also ethnic-racial gaps, in accessing political power, education and health. She stressed the importance of each country in the region recognizing the existence of discrimination and adopting actions to confront it. She is the founder of the organization Voces Caribeñas (Caribbean Voices), and until 2018 she was General Coordinator of the Network of Afro-Latin American, Afro-Caribbean and Diaspora Women, organizations that defend women's rights with an emphasis on racial discrimination.

== Awards ==
- 2011: International Prize for Equality and Non-Discrimination awarded by the National Council to Prevent Discrimination (Conapred)
- 2020: Generation Equality Award
