= Leonel Cubas =

Salvadoran footballer (born 2007)

Personal information
- Full name: Leonel Catán Cubas
- Date of death: February 22, 2007
- Position: Midfielder

Senior career*
Years	Team	Apps	(Gls)
1954–1961	FAS		

International career^{‡}
1961	El Salvador	5	(0)
- * Club domestic league appearances and goals as of 5 August 2011 ‡ National team caps and goals as of 5 August 2011

Leonel Catán Cubas (died 22 February 2007 in Santa Ana, El Salvador) was a football player from El Salvador.

== Club career ==
Nicknamed Negro, Cubas has played for Primera División de Fútbol de El Salvador side FAS with whom he won two league titles. He played at FAS alongside his brother Max Catán Cubas, nicknamed Chele.

== International career ==
In February 1961, Cubas made his debut for El Salvador in a friendly match against Colombian club side America Cali. He has earned a total of 5 including unofficial ones. His final international game was a March 1961 CCCF Championship match against Honduras.

== Honours ==
- Primera División de Fútbol de El Salvador: 2

1954, 1958
