= SV Jong Aruba =

Jong Aruba
- Full name: Sport Vereniging Jong Aruba
- Nicknames: The Red Devils; Red White Black
- Short name: Jong Aruba (English:Youth Aruba); JAR
- Founded: December 1959; 66 years ago
- Ground: Compleho Deportivo Frans Figaroa; Noord, Aruba
- Capacity: 1,000
- President: (Aruba) Chou Farro
- Head Coach: (Aruba) N/A
- League: Aruban Division Uno
- 2024–25: Division di Honor, 9th out of 10; Silver League, 3rd out of 6
- Website: https://www.facebook.com/people/SV-Jong-Aruba/100067018481157
Home colours	Away colours	Third colours

Sport Vereniging Jong Aruba (English:Sports Club) (known as SV Jong Aruba) or simply Jong Aruba is an Aruban football club based in Noord, which currently play in Aruba's first division, Division di Honor.

== Achievements ==
- Aruban Division Uno: 4

1967-68, 2000, 2015–16, 2022–23

== Players ==
=== Current squad ===
As of 28 October 2023

Note: Flags indicate national team as defined under FIFA eligibility rules; some limited exceptions apply. Players may hold more than one non-FIFA nationality.

No.	Pos.	Nation	Player
1	GK	BRA	George da Silva de Souza (Vice-captain)
2	DF	ARU	Richinel de Jongh
3	DF	COL	Christopher Placencio
4	DF	COL	Julio Parra
5	DF	ARU	Eldrick Webb
6	FW	ARU	Anthony Bregita
7	FW	ARU	Ruthlaen Willems
8	DF	ARU	Bernardito Faro (captain)
9	FW	COL	Carlos Montaña
10	FW	ARU	Jasorick Giel (Vice-captain)
11	FW	COL	Lisandro Roza

No.	Pos.	Nation	Player
12	DF	COL	Jesus F. Hurtado
13	MF	ARU	Arron Stamper
14	MF	COL	Alexis Roza
15	FW	ARU	Jordy Giel
16	FW	COL	Rundolfo Jacobs
17	MF	ARU	Jasory Giel (Vice-captain)
18	FW	COL	Juan David Cañas-C.
19	FW	ARU	John Serna
20	FW	ARU	Jeremiah Martinus
21	FW	COL	Harold Gonzalez-G.
22	FW	ARU	Urvin L. Albertsz
