= UNAMOS =

Democratic Renewal Union Unión Democrática Renovadora
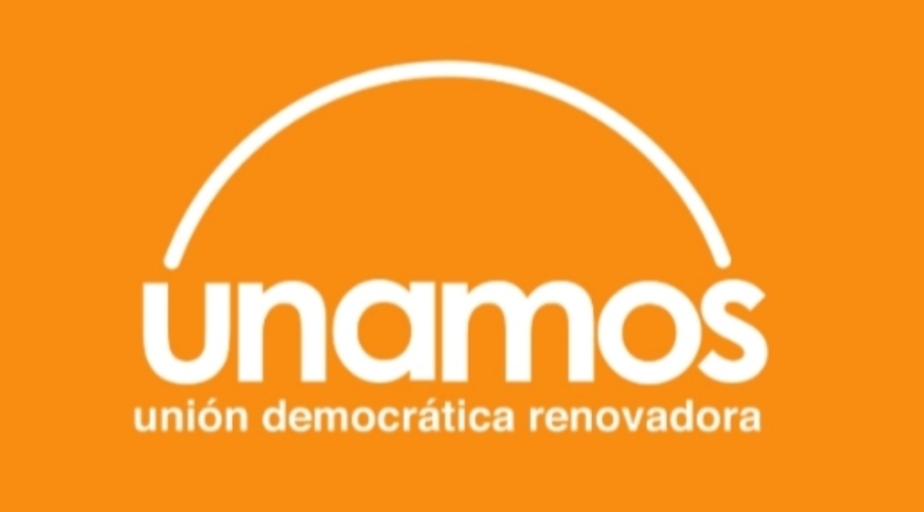
- President: Suyén Barahona Cuan
- Founded: 18 May 1995
- Split from: FSLN
- Headquarters: Managua
- Ideology: Social democracy
- Political position: Left-wing
- International affiliation: Progressive Alliance
- Seats in the National Assembly: 0 / 92

Website
- https://unamosnic.org/

UNAMOS, the Democratic Renewal Union (Spanish: Unión Democrática Renovadora), formerly the Sandinista Renovation Movement (Spanish: Movimiento Renovador Sandinista) (MRS), is a Nicaraguan political party founded in 1995. It defines itself as a democratic and progressive party, made of people of all genders, that promotes the construction of a Nicaragua with opportunities, progress, solidarity, democracy, and sovereignty.

Among its founders were prominent militants of the Sandinista National Liberation Front (FSLN) who separated from the political party because of disagreements with the leadership under Daniel Ortega. These include former vice president Sergio Ramírez, who served as the first president of the MRS, Dora María Téllez, Luis Carrión Cruz, Luis Felipe Pérez Caldera, Leonor Arguello, Reynaldo Antonio Téfel, and Herty Lewites, who was the presidential candidate of the MRS until his sudden death four months prior to the election.

In 2016 the MRS joined the Progressive Alliance, an international organization of labor, social democrats, left parties, organisations and movements from around the world.

The MRS renamed itself Unión Democrática Renovadora (Unamos) in 2021.

== History ==
The constitutive convention of the Movimiento Renovador Sandinista (MRS) was held on 21 May 1995 on the occasion of the centenary of Augusto Sandino (18 May 1895). The convention approved the MRS's foundational documents: Principles, program, statutes, and elected its first national authorities. These foundation documents proceeded to be the guiding principles in this establishment.

From its birth, the founders of the MRS declared their commitment to the postulates of democracy, peace, social equity, and civic struggle.

During 1994 and 1995, the MRS's representatives at the National Assembly participated actively in drafting the constitutional reforms that gave Nicaragua a new legal framework to move towards and to consolidate democracy.

In 1996, the MRS participated in national election with Sergio Ramírez as a presidential candidate and Leonel Arguello as a candidate for the vice-presidency; Ramírez came sixth.

In 2001, the MRS was part of the National Convergence Alliance and through this alliance participated in the presidential election of that year.

=== 2006 elections ===
In the presidential and parliamentary elections of 2006, the MRS headed the MRS Alliance, led by the former mayor of Managua, Herty Lewites, who was nominated as a candidate for the presidency with Edmundo Jarquín Calderón as vice-presidential candidate. Polls placed Herty Lewites and the coalition in a solid and growing third place after the FSLN and Alianza Liberal Nicaragüense (ALN).

The MRS Alliance was also known as the Herty 2006 Alliance in allusion to Herty Lewites, and included the Social Christian Party (PSC), Nicaraguan Socialist Party (PSN), Ecologist Green Party of Nicaragua (PVEN), Party for Citizen Action (PAC), the Movement for the Rescue of the Sandinismo and the Change-Reflection-Ethic-Action Movement (CREA),as well as various social groups including the Autonomous Women’s Movement.

In the middle of the electoral campaign, on 2 July 2006, Herty Lewites died. Then, Edmundo Jarquín Calderón became the candidate for the presidency and Carlos Mejía Godoy the candidate for the vice-presidency. Herty Lewites Rodríguez's death greatly affected the possibilities for the MRS Alliance, with Jarquín Calderón polling in third place with between 10% and 15%, but in the end only came fourth with 6.4% of the votes. In the parliamentary election it received nearly 9% of the vote.

=== 2008-21 ===
On 11 June 2008, in the context of the municipal electoral process for the November 9 elections, the Supreme Electoral Council of Nicaragua (CSE) canceled the legal personality of the MRS, arguing its "self-dissolution". However, only one month earlier, on May 12, the CSE itself had published the final lists of candidates for mayors, deputy mayors, and councilors for all the political parties participating in the elections, including those from the MRS.

In the 2011 national elections, the MRS participated in the UNE alliance (Nicaraguan Unity for the Hope – Spanish: Unidad Nicaragüense por la Esperanza) electoral coalition headed by Fabio Gadea Mantilla of the Independent Liberal Party (PLI), obtaining 2 deputies and 3 substitute deputies in the National Assembly; a deputy owner, and one deputy in the Central American Parliament.

In October 2016, the Broad Front for Democracy (Frente Amplio por la Democracia, FAD) was created. This was an alliance in which the MRS participated together with various political organizations and social movements. FAD's purpose is the establishment of democracy in Nicaragua, through the citizens' civic mobilization.

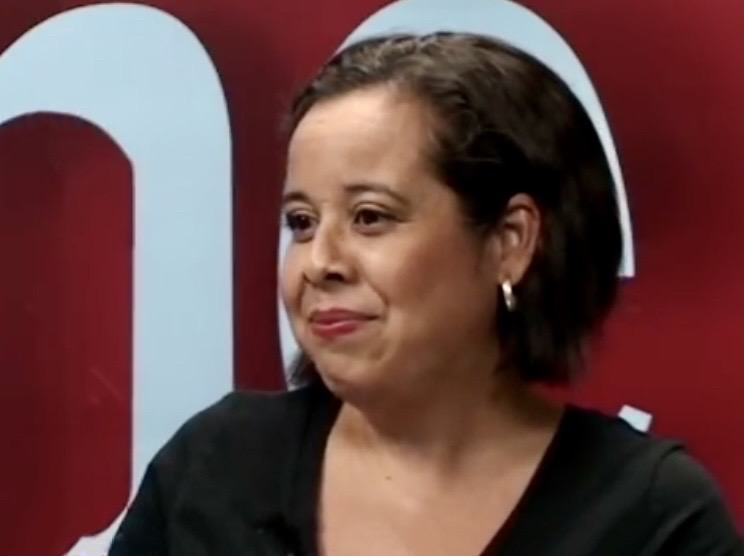
Barahona in 2018

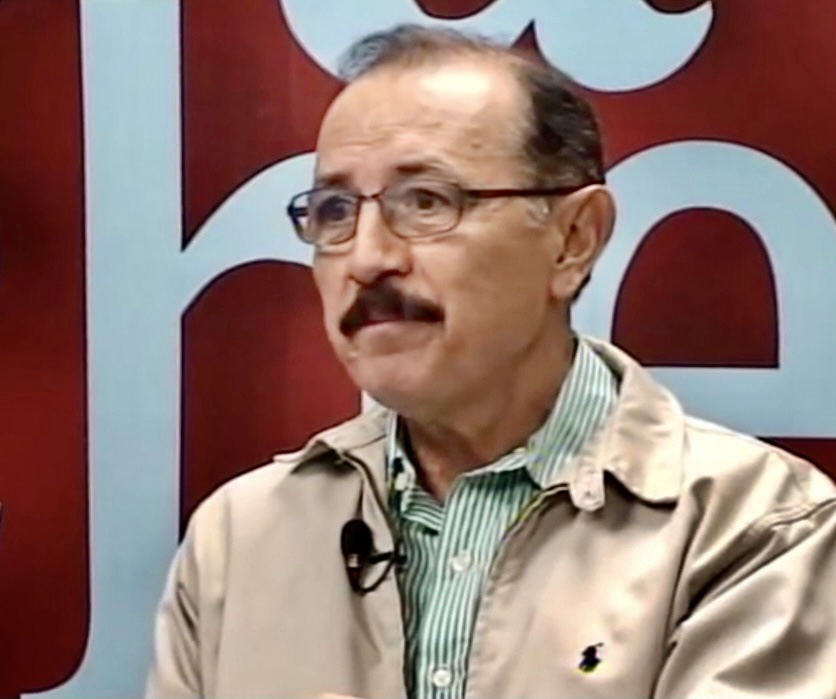
Torres in 2013

On 18 November 2017, the 8th National Convention of the MRS was held. During this convention, Suyén Barahona Cuan was elected as party president and Hugo Torres Jiménez as vice-president.

As a member of the FAD, the MRS is part of the Blue and White National Unity (UNAB), launched on 4 October 2018 as a broad alliance of 43 social and political organizations and movements in opposition to President Ortega.

In 2020, UNAB was one of the opposition groups joining the National Coalition.

In the run-up to the 2021 Nicaraguan general election, four MRS leaders were arrested and imprisoned, including party president Suyén Barahona and party founders Dora María Téllez and Hugo Torres Jiménez (aged 65 and 73), as well as Unamos leader Víctor Hugo Tinoco (aged 69), a former assistant foreign minister and former ambassador to the United Nations and Unamos member Tamara Dávila. Tinoco and Dávila were reported by their families to be still imprisoned in September, and kept in isolation. Former Unamos leader Ana Margarita Vijil was also in prison. The five were still imprisoned after 150 days.

== Presidents of MRS ==
President	Date
Sergio Ramírez	1995-1998
Dora María Téllez	1998-2007
Enrique Sáenz	2007-2012
Ana Margarita Vijil	2012-2017
Suyén Barahona	2017-2023
Luis Alfredo Blandón	2023-2025
