= Dora María Téllez =

Nicaraguan revolutionary (born 1955)

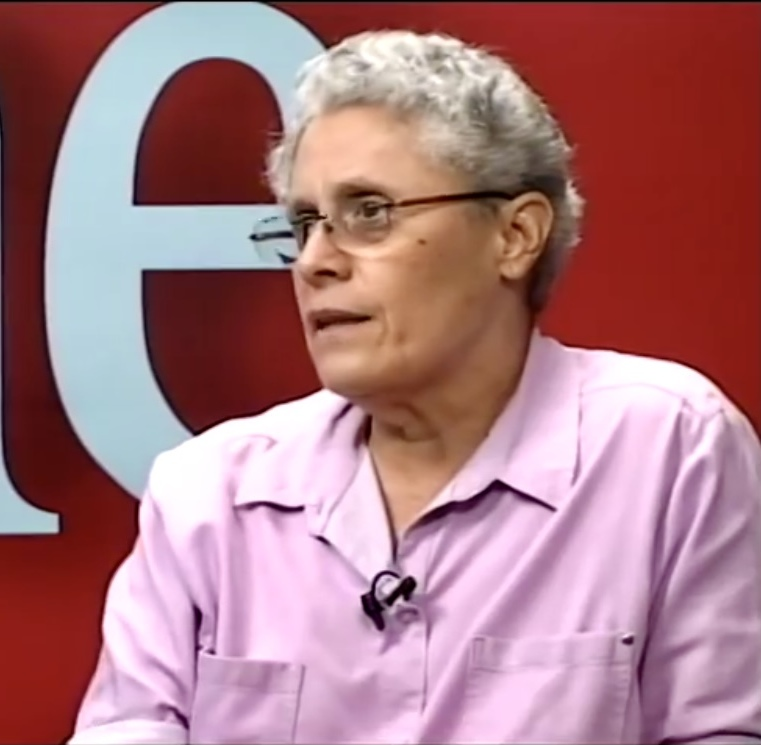
- Téllez in 2016
- Born: Dora María Téllez Argüello; 21 November 1955 (age 70); Matagalpa, Nicaragua
- Other name: Comandante Dos
- Citizenship: Nicaraguan (until 2023); Spanish (since 2023)
- Education: Medicine; History
- Alma mater: National Autonomous University of Nicaragua; Central American University (Managua)
- Occupations: Guerrilla fighter, Politician, Historian
- Title: Commander (ret.)
- Political party: Sandinista National Liberation Front (1973-1995); Sandinista Renovation Movement (1995-2021); UNAMOS Democratic Renewal Union
- Criminal charges: Conspiracy (Political Prisoner)
- Criminal penalty: 15 years
- Criminal status: Released

Dora María Téllez Argüello (born 1955) is a Nicaraguan historian known for her involvement in the Nicaraguan Revolution. As a young university medical student in León in the 1970s, Téllez was recruited by the Sandinista National Liberation Front (FSLN). Téllez went on to become a comandante and fought alongside later president Daniel Ortega in the revolution that ousted dictator Anastasio Somoza Debayle in 1979. In the subsequent FSLN government, she served as Health Minister under Ortega and has also been an advocate for women's rights. She ultimately became a critic of repression and corruption under President Ortega and left the FSLN in 1995 to found the party Sandinista Renovation Movement (MRS), later renamed Unamos. Along with several other opposition figures, she was arrested in June 2021 by the Ortega government.

== Operation Chanchera ==
An increase in government repression and rise of political prisoners being taken prompted Téllez to go underground in 1976. While underground she did educational work in the mountains.

As "Commander Two", at age 22, she was third in command in Operation Chanchera, on August 22, 1978, that occupied the Nicaraguan National Palace in Managua, where the Nicaraguan National Congress was in session. The revolutionaries captured 1,500 civilian hostages and threatened their lives unless their demands were met. The demands included a prisoner release and a monetary ransom. There was a subsequent release of key Sandinista political prisoners and a million-dollar ransom payment, which Téllez played a role in negotiating. This event revealed the potential vulnerability of the Somoza regime and helped the FSLN win support from Latin American governments and unite and mobilize diverse factions of the opposition to the regime. Following the operation, thousands of youths and women joined the Sandinista movement. A popular insurrection grew along with the FSLN and contributed to the fall of the Somoza regime on July 19, 1979.

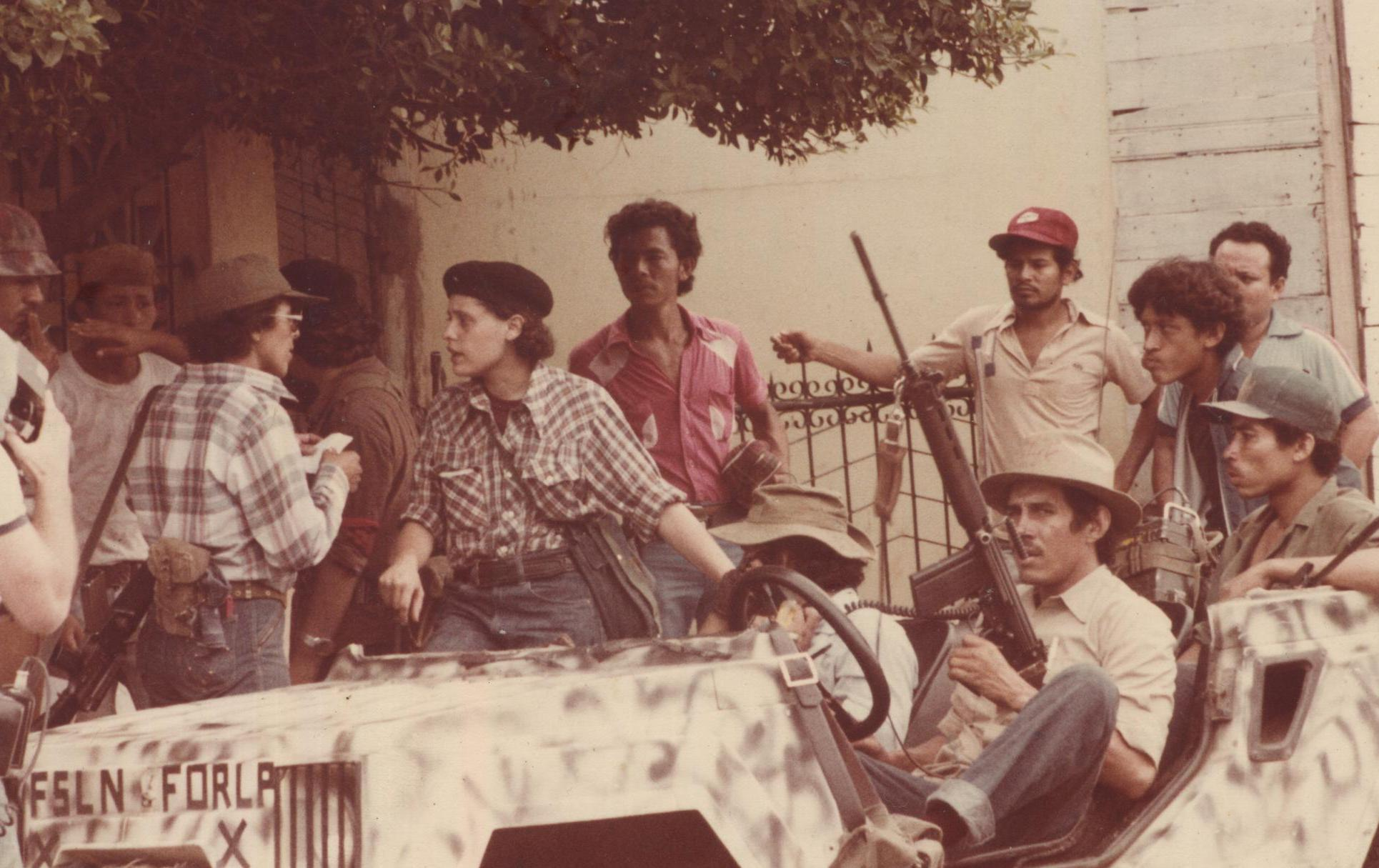
Dora María Téllez (in the center, wearing a black beret) during the FSLN conquest of León (June 1979)

== Military commander during the Nicaraguan Civil War ==
Upon her arrival in Panama with the released Sandinistas in August 1978, Téllez trained in Cuba and Panama to become a military commander. In February 1979 she was back fighting in Nicaragua and she went on to establish a place in the Tercerista leadership structure. For five months she led Sandinista platoons throughout the country in skirmishes with the Nicaraguan National Guard: first in the Southern Front with Edén Pastora's forces, and later in Central and northern Nicaragua. According to Sandinista Commander Mónica Baltodano, her raids on the northern provinces in conjunction with Cmdr Leticia Herrera columns surprised the enemy constantly and succeeded in dispersing their forces to take advantage.

Finally, she led the Sandinista units fighting the enemy's elite forces block by block for six consecutive weeks until they captured the city of León in June 1979, the first major city to fall to the Sandinistas in the Revolution. This was followed by the fall of Managua two weeks later and the installation of the Sandinista Provisional Government Junta in this city soon after.

== Public service in the Sandinista Movement ==
She served as Minister of Health from 1979 to 1990 in the first Sandinista administration. The administration's public health campaign won Nicaragua the UN Educational, Scientific, and Cultural Organization's prize for exceptional health progress. Specifically, Téllez has been quoted discussing the specific health inequalities present in the mining industry in Nicaragua.

Dora María Téllez c. 1985, when she was Minister of Health

Within the Sandinista government, Téllez held positions alongside religious figures to advocate for gay and lesbian rights, as well as reproductive rights for women in Nicaragua.

== Political career ==
Early experience within the FSLN political party included Téllez's position as the Political Secretary for Managua. Téllez also served as a member of the Council of the State. The first congress of the FSLN had an election in 1990 which prompted discontent regarding the election process; however the Directorate decided that the election of a new body would nevertheless be done by slate rather than by voting for individual members. This stunted the potential political candidacy of Téllez, who was being supported by many rank-and-file members. Téllez would have been the Directorate's first female member. In 1994 she was elected to the national directorate of the SNLF as part of a movement to increase women's representation at the highest levels of the SNLF; other women elected at the same time included Dorotea Wilson, Mónica Baltodano, Benigna Mendiola and Myrna Cunningham.

In 1995 Téllez co-founded the Sandinista Renovation Movement (MRS) after resigning her seat in the FSLN. Other former Sandinistas such as Ernesto Cardenal and Sergio Ramírez have joined the MRS political party. The MRS political party opposed the current corruption in the Nicaraguan government and appointed Herty Lewites to run as the party's candidate in the 2006 presidential election against Daniel Ortega. Four months before the election was to be held, Lewites died of natural causes. Ortega, who had been president from 1985 to 1990, won the presidential election and regained political power in Nicaragua.

On 4 June 2008, Téllez began a hunger strike to protest the "dictatorship of Daniel Ortega", her former comrade-in-arms. Ortega and his supporters stripped the MRS of its legal status about one week later. Téllez suspended her hunger strike on June 16, after doctors told her she would suffer irreparable damage if she continued her fast. She vowed to begin "a new stage of struggle" against what she termed the dictatorial policies of Daniel Ortega.

== Imprisonment and release ==
In June 2021, she was arrested by the Ortega government in a wave of arrests of opposition presidential candidates in the 2021 Nicaraguan general election as well as other opposition leaders, journalists, businessmen, peasants, feminists, and social activists. She was sentenced in February 2022, in an express hearing that took place within the prison where she was held. The Prosecutor's Office requested 15 years in prison, plus disqualification from holding public office.

She was freed after 605 days of imprisonment along with 222 other Nicaraguan prisoners. She was expelled to the United States and her Nicaraguan nationality, along with that of the other prisoners, was revoked. The Spanish government offered to guarantee nationality to all prisoners. Shortly after her release, she recounted the conditions of psychological torture and violation of international law regarding prisoners to which she was subjected, although she said that there was no physical torture or violence against her. She spoke about the death of one her companions due to lack of medical attention, the former revolutionary general Hugo Torres Jiménez.

== Academic life as a historian ==
Téllez wrote publications on Nicaraguan history that underscore the importance of the north-central region of the country to the nation's political and economic history. Her book, "Muera la Gobierna: colonizacion en Matagalpa y Jinotega 1820-1890" documents the process of internal colonization and land dispossession carried out by the Nicaraguan state in the northern region of Nicaragua between 1820 and 1890. She was incorporated as a member of the Academy of Geography and History of Nicaragua in recognition for her contributions, and she was also distinguished as a corresponding Member of the Academy of Geography and History of Guatemala.

In 2004 she was appointed Robert F. Kennedy Visiting Professor in Latin American studies at the Harvard Divinity School, but was barred from obtaining an entry visa to the United States under the Patriot Act, on grounds that she was a terrorist, citing as evidence the raid on the Nicaraguan National Palace in Managua. This prompted 122 members of the academic community from Harvard and 15 other North American universities to publish a statement in her defense, stating:

The accusation made by the State Department against Dora María Téllez... amounts to political persecution of those who have engaged in overthrowing the atrocious dictatorship of Anastasio Somoza in Nicaragua...This regime was almost universally viewed as criminal and inhumane, and yet it was financially and militarily supported by the United States...In reference to dictatorships, just as the State Department cannot affirm that the activities of Nelson Mandela against the atrocious dictatorship of apartheid in South Africa were terrorist activities, neither can it affirm that Dora María's activities against the atrocious Somoza dictatorship were terrorist.
