= Central American University, Managua =

Private university in Managua, Nicaragua

Central American University
- Universidad Centroamericana
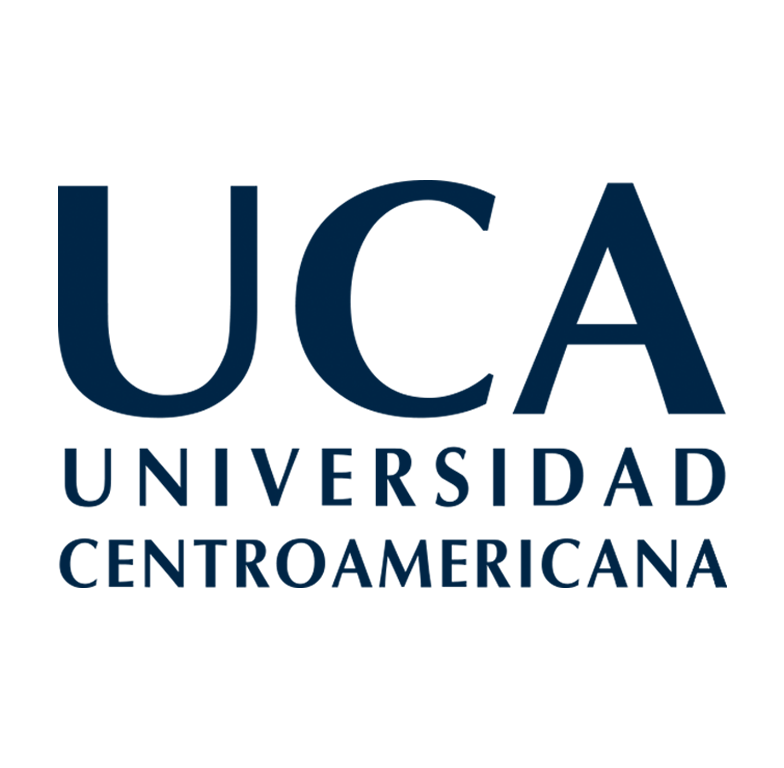
- Veritas liberabit vos. Truth will make you free.
- Motto: Somos UCA
- Motto in English: We're UCA
- Type: Private
- Active: 1960–2023
- Affiliations: AUSJAL (Assoc.of Jesuit Universities in LA)
- Religious affiliation: Jesuit (Roman Catholic)
- Rector: Rev. José Alberto Idiáquez Guevara, SJ
- Academic staff: 829
- Administrative staff: 540
- Undergraduates: 8,787
- Postgraduates: 643
- Location: Managua, Nicaragua; 12°07′31″N 86°16′19″W
- Website: www.uca.edu.ni

Central American University – Managua (Universidad Centroamericana – UCA) was a private Catholic university located in Managua, Nicaragua. It was founded in July 1960 by the Society of Jesus on land donated by the Somoza family and was the first private university in Central America. It numbered among its alumni Daniel Ortega, who did not graduate, Daisy Zamora, Sheynnis Palacios, and Ernesto Leal. It was located on Avenida Universitaria in the capital city of Managua (Nicaragua).

On August 16, 2023, through a spurious judicial decree, the university was closed and confiscated by the government of Daniel Ortega, accusing it of operating as a center for "terrorism" by organizing "delinquent groups," within the framework of the political crisis that Nicaragua has been experiencing since 2018 following protests against reforms to the Nicaraguan Social Security Institute. In its place, the government established the Universidad Nacional Casimiro Sotel Montenegro (National University Casimiro Sotelo Montenegro) within the university's former facilities.

== Academics ==
=== Courses ===
- Faculty of Law

Law degree

- Faculty of Humanities and Communication

Degree in communication
Degree in psychology
Bachelor of Social Work and Development Management
Degree in teaching English as a foreign language
Degree in sociology
Bachelor of Arts and Philosophy

- Faculty of Science, Technology, and Environment

Architecture
Information systems engineering
Network engineering and telecommunications
Industrial engineering
Environmental engineering
Civil engineering
Degree in graphic design

- Faculty of Business Economics

Master in business administration
Degree in applied economics
Degree in public accounting and auditing
Degree in finance
BA in marketing

=== Centers of learning ===
Centro Superior de Idiomas (CSI) at UCA offers a variety of programs open to all who are interested in studying languages: English (for children, adolescents, and adults as well as ESL), German, French, Japanese,) Russian, and Spanish for foreigners. An MA in English is also offered.

Center for Molecular Biology (CBM) was established at the Faculty of Science and Technology at UCA in 1999 with financial help from the Pew Foundation, New England Biolabs, WHO, and the University of California San Francisco. As the first molecular research center in Nicaragua it addresses human, economic, and industrial development as well as environmental, agricultural, and health issues. It has grown to include a DNA diagnostic utility for the police and the judicial system, paternity tests, and numerous other programs including graduate education. It organizes the National Biotechnology Congress which includes Nobel Prize winners among its participants, and helps shape public policy.

=== Artistic groups ===
Cocurricular activities include classes which meet several hours a week: choir, lyric singing, artistic dance, experimental theater, group singing and vocal technique, and creative writing.

=== Exchange programs ===
In 2016 UCA had exchange programs with 51 universities in 20 countries worldwide.

=== Job placement ===
The University assists students and alumni to make contact with private and public institutions for both temporary internships and more permanent placement. At the same time UCA strives to provide solutions to problems facing various institutions and businesses in the country, thereby contributing to the development of the country.

== Sports ==
UCA treats sports as integral to the formation of students and a means whereby the university models healthy living. UCA offers students the opportunity to learn and develop their talents in 11 different sports: volleyball, table tennis, basketball, indoor soccer, karate, taekwondo, judo, chess, tennis, sambo, and self-defense. Sports with intramural tournaments are basketball, volleyball, indoor soccer, table tennis, and chess. Seventy percent of the students who play on UCA interscholastic teams also play on various national teams. Roy Zuniga was founder of the soccer team and captain for UCA. He played for the national team and for Diriangen F.C. was a legendary goalkeeper known as "El Portero Historico." The UCA volleyball coach Rene Quintana is the Central American representative for the International Commission of NORCECA Volleyball Championships. She has been recognized in the national hall of fame for coaching 23 national championship teams over the past 30 years.

== Spirituality ==
Workshops for reflection and personal growth. These are open to students, graduates, teachers, and university workers.

Systemic Family Configurations: transgenerational, therapeutic techniques used for personal and group processes.

UCA Healthy promotes care of one's health and facilitates healthy lifestyles in the UCA community.

Spiritual Exercises of St. Ignatius of Loyola, an ordered sequence of meditations and contemplations fostering a greater awareness of God in one's life.

Service projects. Since 1995 the University Pastoral Center has sponsored a social volunteer program open to students, graduates, teachers, and all university personnel. In 2016 there were 230 volunteers assisting in projects which include those of all ages with disabilities, a nursing home, street children, community centers for young school children, a home for abused children and another for adolescent girls, an infant's hospital, and work with incarcerated men. The University encourages students through volunteering to develop feelings of humanism and solidarity with the most vulnerable.

== University radio ==
Radio Universidad, the first college radio station in the country, was born on October 8, 1984, at UNAN Managua, as an educational initiative by the Director of Journalism Vicente Baca Lagos, and was embraced by the student movement in those early post-revolution years. Several UNAN programs had been assigned to other universities, and Journalism and Psychology on the Ricardo Morales Aviles on the UNAN Campus, with all its infrastructure and projects, was entrusted to UCA under Fr. César Jerez, S.J. Thus began the experimental radio station for students of journalism to get pre-professional practice, with support from the Deputy Minister of Telecommunications (TELCOR) Bayardo Altamirano. In the succeeding years the most active reporters took over as directors of the station: Gustavo Adolfo Montalvan, Alina Guerrero, Luis Lopez Ruiz, and Azucena Castillo. The station currently is a non-profit owned by UCA to facilitate intra-university communication and professional training. It has 4 transmitters, the strongest being 10,000 watts, and runs on 99.5 FM and 102.3 FM. It has a staff of 23, mostly students and graduates of UCA.

== Publications ==
Envio is a political, social, cultural, and economic review published since 1981, as the voice of the Central American Historical Institute. It began in the wake of the Sandinista victory and reported to the world the revolutionary process that was going on in Nicaragua. with editions in several languages. In the '80s, though there was no Sandinista censorship of the periodical, articles were not signed, to emphasize collective thought. With the electoral defeat of the FSLN in February 1990, the review focused more on regional issues, North-South issues, globalization, the women's movement, ecology, and foreign debt, probing possibilities for a better future. Since 1994 it has been published also in English and in Italian. Since 2003 Envio has used internet in an effort to retain the remembrance of the past and to be heard in a world that seems tuned out from the problems of the South.

Encounter is the oldest scholarly academic journal in Nicaragua, originating in 1968. The intellectuals who created this quarterly envisaged reflections on the confrontation of cultures in Nicaragua, between North and South America and also between the Mexican (Nahua and Aztec) and Andean (Inca and Chibcha) cultures. It searched for human solidarity, beginning with teachers and students. Publication was interrupted for a year after the earthquake that destroyed Managua in 1972 and from financial constraints at UCA from 1990 to 1993. After 1972 Encounter was an annual, but in 1998 it returned to being a quarterly of social research.

== Institutes ==
Nitlapan Institute of Research and Development was founded in 1988 to assist the peasantry in their social and economic development, while enhancing the education of the graduate students. The name Nitlapan is a Nahuatl word for “time to sow” and evokes the hope that the work of the institute will be fruitful. In the mid-1990s the institute was able to offer a Local Development Fund and technical assistance. Over time efforts at funding yielded to the efforts at research into entrepreneurship and development, gender equality, and mediation. In 2017 recent reports covered the topics of rural youth and access to land, rural women and the gender issue, the Earth Forum in Caruaru (Brazil), Nitlapan success stories, and a forum on land grabbing for the production of pineapples and African palm on the Costa Rica-Nicaraguan border.

Juan XXIII Institute of Social Action was founded in 1962 to help build homes and extend health services for the poor. By 2013 its services had reached 55 municipalities. Through a development fund the institute provides loans for the improvement of housing in conjunction with government and business organizations. The institute helped in the reconstruction of Cusmapa after the Hurricane Mitch and in 2011 teamed with CAFOD to lend assistance to Villa El Carmen. Recent work has included Ciudad Darío.

Institute of Training, Research, and Environmental Development (CIDEA-UCA) works for sustainable development in the country and the region, through studies and support services that address social, environmental, and food security problems. This includes cooperation with national and international institutions, promoting awareness and encouraging corporate social responsibility. CIDEA-UCA had its origins in 1996 when the Government and people of Japan helped establish the Shrimp Research Center (CIC) at UCA, to develop shrimp farming in Puerto Morazan. In 2001 CIC became the Research Center for Aquatic Ecosystems and in 2011 the Institute of Training, Research, and Environmental development (CIDEA-UCA), diversifying its activities and assuming the objectives which it has today.

Institute of History of Nicaragua and Central America (IHNCA), opened in September 1997, is housed in a three-storey building with research areas, auditoriums, exhibition halls, and documentary deposits. It is dedicated to research and to preservation of documentary evidence of Nicaraguan history. The IHNCA was formed from the merger of the Jesuit's Central Library of the Historical Institute (BIHCA) founded in 1934 and the Institute of History of Nicaragua (IHN) founded in 1987 and assigned to UCA by presidential decree in 1990.

Education Institute UCA (IDEUCA) carries on research into educational policy and into training educational leaders for Nicaragua and Central America. It fosters teacher training with a focus on education that is inclusive of girls and of human rights, and that fosters a culture of peace.

National Herbarium of Nicaragua at UCA holds a collection of 80,000 samples of tree species which helped create the a map of the ecosystem and vegetation of Nicaragua, and to develop the Central Herbaria Network.

== Notable alumni ==
- Dorotea Wilson, politician and activist
- Roy Zuniga (11/30/1941 - 6/11/1976), known as el "Portero Historico" of Nicaragua." One of the founders and Captain of the soccer team at the Central American University in Managua.
