= Bonaire national football team results (unofficial matches) =

This is a list of unofficial international football games played by the Bonaire national football team before April 2013, when Bonaire was granted associate membership in CONCACAF.

== Results ==
Key

Win Draw Loss

=== Dutch Territory of Bonaire ===
4 February 1934 Friendly	Aruba (Netherlands)	4–0	(Netherlands) Bonaire	Aruba

=== As part of Netherlands Antilles (1959–2010) ===
7 March 1960 Friendly	Curaçao (Netherlands Antilles)	2–0	(Netherlands Antilles) Bonaire	Curaçao

8 March 1960 Friendly	Aruba (Netherlands Antilles)	4–2	(Netherlands Antilles) Bonaire	Aruba

November 1965 Friendly	Curaçao (Netherlands Antilles)	1–0	(Netherlands Antilles) Bonaire	Curaçao

November 1965 Friendly	Curaçao (Netherlands Antilles)	2–0	(Netherlands Antilles) Bonaire	Curaçao

1 July 1967 Friendly	Curaçao (Netherlands Antilles)	1–0	(Netherlands Antilles) Bonaire	Curaçao

2 July 1967 Friendly	Curaçao (Netherlands Antilles)	2–0	(Netherlands Antilles) Bonaire	Curaçao

8 July 1967 Friendly	Aruba (Netherlands Antilles)	4–0	(Netherlands Antilles) Bonaire	Aruba

9 July 1967 Friendly	Aruba (Netherlands Antilles)	1–2	(Netherlands Antilles) Bonaire	Aruba

19 April 1968 Friendly	Aruba (Netherlands Antilles)	5–0	(Netherlands Antilles) Bonaire	Aruba

11 October 1968 Friendly	Curaçao (Netherlands Antilles)	8–0	(Netherlands Antilles) Bonaire	Curaçao

13 October 1968 Friendly	Aruba (Netherlands Antilles)	2–2	(Netherlands Antilles) Bonaire	Aruba

7 March 1969 Friendly	Curaçao (Netherlands Antilles)	2–0	(Netherlands Antilles) Bonaire	Curaçao

8 March 1969 Friendly	Aruba (Netherlands Antilles)	4–2	(Netherlands Antilles) Bonaire	Aruba

8 August 1969 Friendly	Aruba (Netherlands Antilles)	1–0	(Netherlands Antilles) Bonaire	Aruba

9 August 1969 Friendly	Curaçao (Netherlands Antilles)	10–0	(Netherlands Antilles) Bonaire	Curaçao

1 May 1970 Friendly	Bonaire (Netherlands Antilles)	3–0	(Netherlands Antilles) Aruba	Bonaire

3 May 1970 Friendly	Bonaire (Netherlands Antilles)	2–2	(Netherlands Antilles) Curaçao	Bonaire

27 November 1970 Friendly	Curaçao (Netherlands Antilles)	3–0	(Netherlands Antilles) Bonaire	Curaçao

23 January 1971 Friendly	Curaçao (Netherlands Antilles)	1–1	(Netherlands Antilles) Bonaire	Curaçao

27 February 1971 Friendly	Bonaire (Netherlands Antilles)	1–0	(Netherlands Antilles) Aruba	Bonaire

11 December 1971 Friendly	Curaçao (Netherlands Antilles)	4–1	(Netherlands Antilles) Bonaire	Curaçao

12 December 1971 Friendly	Aruba (Netherlands Antilles)	4–2	(Netherlands Antilles) Bonaire	Aruba

2 December 1972 Friendly	Curaçao (Netherlands Antilles)	1–0	(Netherlands Antilles) Bonaire	Curaçao

3 December 1972 Friendly	Aruba (Netherlands Antilles)	2–0	(Netherlands Antilles) Bonaire	Aruba

15 December 1972 Friendly	Bonaire (Netherlands Antilles)	2–1	(Netherlands Antilles) Aruba	Bonaire

17 December 1972 Friendly	Bonaire (Netherlands Antilles)	0–1	(Netherlands Antilles) Curaçao	Bonaire

20 April 1974 Friendly	Aruba (Netherlands Antilles)	0–2	(Netherlands Antilles) Bonaire	Aruba

21 April 1974 Friendly	Curaçao (Netherlands Antilles)	1–0	(Netherlands Antilles) Bonaire	Curaçao

2 May 1975 Friendly	Aruba (Netherlands Antilles)	4–2	(Netherlands Antilles) Bonaire	Aruba

4 May 1975 Friendly	Curaçao (Netherlands Antilles)	4–1	(Netherlands Antilles) Bonaire	Curaçao

12 June 1976 Friendly	Bonaire (Netherlands Antilles)	1–1	(Netherlands Antilles) Aruba	Bonaire

13 June 1976 Friendly	Bonaire (Netherlands Antilles)	0–1	(Netherlands Antilles) Aruba	Bonaire

9 July 1976 Friendly	Aruba (Netherlands Antilles)	6–1	(Netherlands Antilles) Bonaire	Aruba

10 July 1976 Friendly	Aruba (Netherlands Antilles)	3–1	(Netherlands Antilles) Bonaire	Aruba

29 March 1980 Friendly	Aruba (Netherlands Antilles)	5–3	(Netherlands Antilles) Bonaire	Aruba

30 March 1980 Friendly	Curaçao (Netherlands Antilles)	5–0	(Netherlands Antilles) Bonaire	Curaçao

12 March 1982 Friendly	Aruba (Netherlands Antilles)	1–2	(Netherlands Antilles) Bonaire	Aruba

12 April 1982 Friendly	Curaçao (Netherlands Antilles)	4–0	(Netherlands Antilles) Bonaire	Curaçao

25 March 1983 Friendly	Aruba (Netherlands Antilles)	1–2	(Netherlands Antilles) Bonaire	Aruba

26 April 1983 Friendly	Curaçao (Netherlands Antilles)	0–1	(Netherlands Antilles) Bonaire	Curaçao

5 February 1984 Friendly	Bonaire (Netherlands Antilles)	0–1	(Netherlands Antilles) Curaçao	Bonaire

9 February 1984 Friendly	Curaçao (Netherlands Antilles)	6–1	(Netherlands Antilles) Bonaire	Curaçao

6 July 1984 Friendly	Aruba (Netherlands Antilles)	0–5	(Netherlands Antilles) Bonaire	Aruba

8 July 1984 Friendly	Curaçao (Netherlands Antilles)	2–1	(Netherlands Antilles) Bonaire	Curaçao

31 May 1985 Friendly	Bonaire (Netherlands Antilles)	3–1	(Netherlands Antilles) Aruba	Bonaire

2 June 1985 Friendly	Bonaire (Netherlands Antilles)	0–1	(Netherlands Antilles) Curaçao	Bonaire

5 April 1986 Friendly	Bonaire (Netherlands Antilles)	0–2	(Netherlands Antilles) Curaçao	Bonaire

12 April 1986 Friendly	Curaçao (Netherlands Antilles)	1–0	(Netherlands Antilles) Bonaire	Curaçao

28 February 1988 Friendly	Curaçao (Netherlands Antilles)	4–2	(Netherlands Antilles) Bonaire	Curaçao

5 March 1988 Friendly	Bonaire (Netherlands Antilles)	1–1	(Netherlands Antilles) Curaçao	Bonaire

=== Special municipality ===
28 February 2010 Friendly	Curaçao	4–0	Bonaire	Willemstad, Curaçao
				Stadium: Ergilio Hato Stadium

29 October 2010 2010 ABCS Tournament	Suriname	4–2	Bonaire	Willemstad, Curaçao
	Kwasie 13', 63'; Rijssel 39'; Rigters (4–2)		Martha (3–1); I. Piar (3–2) (pen.)	Stadium: Ergilio Hato Stadium

31 October 2010 2010 ABCS Tournament	Aruba	3–3 (abandoned)^{1}	Bonaire	Willemstad, Curaçao
	Santos; Escalona (pen.)		I. Piar; A. Piar; Christiaan	Stadium: Ergilio Hato Stadium

2 December 2011 2011 ABCS Tournament	Curaçao	1–3	Bonaire	Paramaribo, Suriname
18:00 UTC−3	Bito 10'	report	Kunst 25'; A. Piar 72'; Calvenhoven 87'	Stadium: Dr. Ir. F. Essed Stadion; Referee: Enrico Wijngaarde (Suriname)

5 December 2011 2011 ABCS Tournament	Bonaire	2–2 (4–3 p)	Aruba	Paramaribo, Suriname
18:00 UTC−3	Kunst 34'; Janzen (45+?)	report	Bergen 50'; Gomez 53'	Stadium: Dr. Ir. F. Essed Stadion; Referee: Enrico Wijngaarde (Suriname)
	Penalties
	Bernardus (penalty scored); Janzen (penalty scored); Calvenhoven (penalty scored); Tomasa (penalty scored)		(penalty missed) Breinburg; (penalty scored) Bergen; (penalty scored) Santos de Gouveia; (penalty scored) Kock; (penalty missed) Gomez

13 July 2012 2012 ABCS Tournament	Suriname	8–0	Bonaire	Oranjestad, Aruba
21:15 UTC−4	Limon 28'; Jomena 30'; Wall 37'; Sordam 52'; Aloema 61' (pen.); Jomena 63'; Djemesi 74'; Drenthe 88'			Stadium: Complejo Deportivo Guillermo Prospero Trinidad; Referee: Rudolph Angela (Aruba)

15 July 2012 2012 ABCS Tournament	Bonaire	2–9	Curaçao	Oranjestad, Aruba
17:00 UTC−4				Stadium: Complejo Deportivo Guillermo Prospero Trinidad; Referee: Antonius Pinas (Suriname)

^{1}Players of Bonaire walked off the pitch after a disagreement over a penalty kick being given against them.
