= Suriname national football team results =

== 2008 ==
5 February 2008 2010 FIFA World Cup Q	Suriname	Cancelled	Montserrat	Paramaribo, Suriname
		Report		Stadium: André Kamperveen Stadion

26 March 2008 2010 FIFA World Cup Q	Montserrat	1–7	Suriname	Tunapuna, Montserrat
20:00		Report		Stadium: Marvin Lee Stadium

21 May 2008 Chippie Polar Cup	Netherlands Antilles	2–1	Suriname	Willemstad, Netherlands Antilles
20:00		Report		Stadium: Ergilio Hato Stadion

22 May 2008 Chippie Polar Cup	Esporte Clube Flamengo (Brazil)	2–0	Suriname	Willemstad, Netherlands Antilles
20:00		Unofficial Chippie Polar Cup match for third place		Stadium: Ergilio Hato Stadion

14 June 2008 2010 FIFA World Cup Q	Suriname	1–0	Guyana	Paramaribo, Suriname
		Report		Stadium: André Kamperveen Stadion

22 June 2008 2010 FIFA World Cup Q	Guyana	1–2	Suriname	Providence, Guyana
		Report		Stadium: Providence Stadium

9 August 2008 2008 Caribbean Cup Q	Suriname	3–1	Dominica	Providence, Guyana
		Report		Stadium: Providence Stadium

10 August 2008 2008 Caribbean Cup Q	Guyana	1–1	Suriname	Providence, Guyana
		Report		Stadium: Providence Stadium

20 August 2008 2010 FIFA World Cup Q	Haiti	2–2	Suriname	Port-au-Prince, Haiti
		Report		Stadium: Stade Sylvio Cator

7 September 2008 2010 FIFA World Cup Q	Costa Rica	7–0	Suriname	San José, Costa Rica
		Report		Stadium: Estadio Ricardo Saprissa Aymá (San Juan de Tíbás)

10 September 2008 2010 FIFA World Cup Q	Suriname	0–2	El Salvador	Paramaribo, Suriname
		Report		Stadium: André Kamperveen Stadion

11 October 2008 2010 FIFA World Cup Q	Suriname	1–4	Costa Rica	Paramaribo, Suriname
		Report		Stadium: André Kamperveen Stadion

16 October 2008 2010 FIFA World Cup Q	El Salvador	3–0	Suriname	San Salvador, El Salvador
		Report

23 October 2008 2008 Caribbean Cup Q	Barbados	3–2	Suriname	Havana, Cuba
		Report		Stadium: Estadio Pedro Marrero

25 October 2008 2008 Caribbean Cup Q	Suriname	2–1	Netherlands Antilles	Havana, Cuba
		Report		Stadium: Estadio Pedro Marrero

27 October 2008 2008 Caribbean Cup Q	Cuba	6–0	Suriname	Havana, Cuba
		Report		Stadium: Estadio Pedro Marrero

19 November 2008 2010 FIFA World Cup Q	Suriname	1–1	Haiti	Paramaribo, Suriname
		Report		Stadium: André Kamperveen Stadion

== 2009 ==
28 October 2009 Friendly	Suriname	0–1	Guyana	Paramaribo, Suriname
		Report		Stadium: André Kamperveen Stadion

31 October 2009 Friendly	Suriname	1–1	Netherlands Antilles	Paramaribo, Suriname
20:00		Report		Stadium: André Kamperveen Stadion

== 2010 ==
14 October 2010 2010 Caribbean Cup Q	Suriname	2–1	Netherlands Antilles	Paramaribo, Suriname
20:00		Report		Stadium: André Kamperveen Stadion

16 October 2010 2010 Caribbean Cup Q	Suriname	2–1	Saint Lucia	Paramaribo, Suriname
20:00		Report		Stadium: André Kamperveen Stadion

18 October 2010 2010 Caribbean Cup Q	Suriname	0–2	Guyana	Paramaribo, Suriname
20:00		Report		Stadium: André Kamperveen Stadion

29 October 2010 ABCS Tournament	Suriname	4–2	Bonaire	Willemstad, Curaçao
				Stadium: Ergilio Hato Stadion

29 October 2010 ABCS Tournament	Curaçao	2–2 (6–7 p)	Suriname	Willemstad, Curaçao
		Report		Stadium: Ergilio Hato Stadion

10 November 2010 2010 Caribbean Cup Q	Antigua and Barbuda	2–1	Suriname	St. John's, Antigua and Barbuda
20:00		Report		Stadium: St. John's Recreation Center

12 November 2010 2010 Caribbean Cup Q	Suriname	3–3	Cuba	St. John's, Antigua and Barbuda
19:30		Report		Stadium: St. John's Recreation Center

14 November 2010 2010 Caribbean Cup Q	Dominica	0–5	Suriname	St. John's, Antigua and Barbuda
19:30		Report		Stadium: St. John's Recreation Center

== 2011 ==
2 September 2011 2014 FIFA World Cup Q	Suriname	1–0	Cayman Islands	Paramaribo, Suriname
20:00	Mando 11' (pen.)	Report		Stadium: André Kamperveen Stadion; Referee: A. Skeete (Barbados)

6 September 2011 2014 FIFA World Cup Q	Dominican Republic	1–1	Suriname	San Cristóbal, Dominican Republic
		Report		Stadium: Estadio Panamericano

24 September 2011 Friendly	Suriname	2–0	Curaçao	Paramaribo, Suriname
	Rijssel 25'; M. Pinas 60'	Report		Stadium: André-Kamperveen-Stadion; Referee: A. Pireau (Suriname)

25 September 2011 Friendly	Suriname	2–2	Curaçao	Paramaribo, Suriname
		Report		Stadium: André-Kamperveen-Stadion

8 October 2011 2014 FIFA World Cup Q	Cayman Islands	0–1	Suriname	George Town, Cayman Islands
20:00		Report	Drenthe 57'	Stadium: Truman Bodden Stadium; Referee: E. Jurisevic (United States)

11 October 2011 2014 FIFA World Cup Q	Suriname	1–3	Dominican Republic	Paramaribo, Suriname
		Report		Stadium: André-Kamperveen-Stadion

11 November 2011 2014 FIFA World Cup Q	Suriname	1–3	El Salvador	Paramaribo, Suriname
		Report		Stadium: André-Kamperveen-Stadion; Referee: Valman Bedeau (Grenada)

16 November 2011 2014 FIFA World Cup Q	El Salvador	4–0	Suriname	San Salvador, El Salvador
		Report		Stadium: Estadio Cuscatlán

2 December 2011 ABCS Tournament	Suriname	0–0 (4–5 p)	Aruba	Paramaribo, Suriname
		Report		Stadium: Dr. Ir. Franklin Essed Stadion

4 December 2011 ABCS Tournament	Suriname	2–0	Curaçao	Paramaribo, Suriname
		Report		Stadium: Dr. Ir. Franklin Essed Stadion

== 2012 ==
13 July 2012 ABCS Tournament	Suriname	8–0	Bonaire	Oranjestad, Aruba
20:00	Limon 28'; Jomena 30', 63'; Waal 37'; Sordam; Aloema 63' (pen.); Djemesi 74'; Drenthe 88'	Report		Stadium: Trinidad Stadium

15 July 2012 ABCS Tournament	Aruba	1–0	Suriname	Oranjestad, Aruba
	Gilkes 35'	Report		Stadium: Trinidad Stadium

6 September 2012 2012 Caribbean Cup Q	Montserrat	1–7	Suriname	Le Lamentin, Martinique
	Allen 48'	Report	Waal 3', 11'; Sordam 16'; Vallei 39'; Drenthe 45'; Rijssel 85', 90+1'	Stadium: Stade Municipal Pierre-Aliker; Referee: Rudolph Angela (Aruba)

8 September 2012 2012 Caribbean Cup Q	British Virgin Islands	0–4	Suriname	Le Lamentin, Martinique
		Report	Rijssel 35', 42'; Drenthe 36'; Loswijk 81'	Stadium: Stade Municipal Pierre-Aliker; Referee: William Anderson (Puerto Rico)

10 September 2012 2012 Caribbean Cup Q	Martinique	2–2	Suriname	Le Lamentin, Martinique
	Parsemain 3'; Maingé 22'	Report	Aloema 25'; Loswijk 90+2'	Stadium: Stade Municipal Pierre-Aliker; Referee: Rudolph Angela (Aruba)

14 November 2012 2012 Caribbean Cup	Cuba	5–0	Suriname	Bacolet, Trinidad and Tobago
	Hernandez 6', 23', 60', 73'; Martinez 48'	Report		Stadium: Dwight Yorke Stadium; Referee: Valman Bedeau (Grenada)

17 November 2012 2012 Caribbean Cup	Trinidad and Tobago	3–0	Suriname	Bacolet, Trinidad and Tobago
	Power 35'; Roy 50'; David 88'	Report		Stadium: Dwight Yorke Stadium; Referee: Alain Georges (Haiti)

18 November 2012 2012 Caribbean Cup	Suriname	1–0	Saint Vincent and the Grenadines	Bacolet, Trinidad and Tobago
	Aloema 42' (pen.)	Report		Stadium: Dwight Yorke Stadium; Referee: Alain Georges (Haiti)

== 2013 ==
14 November 2013 ABCS Tournament	Bonaire	0–2	Suriname	Willemstad, Curaçao
20:00		Report	Talea 3'; Apai 61'	Stadium: Ergilio Hato Stadion

16 November 2013 ABCS Tournament	Curaçao	1–3	Suriname	Willemstad, Curaçao
	Leuteria 43'	Report	V. Pinas 3'; Najoe 67', 88'	Stadium: Ergilio Hato Stadion

== 2014 ==
21 May 2014 Friendly	French Guiana	0–0	Suriname	Cayenne, French Guiana
		Report		Stadium: Stade de Baduel

28 May 2014 Friendly	Suriname	1–0	French Guiana	Paramaribo, Suriname
	Loswijk	Report		Stadium: Dr. Ir. Franklin Essed Stadion

24 August 2014 Friendly	French Guiana	0–1	Suriname	Cayenne, French Guiana
		Report	Talea	Stadium: Stade de Baduel

4 September 2014 2014 Caribbean Cup Q	Barbados	1–1	Suriname	Fort-de-France, Martinique
	Burgess 69'	Report	Faerber 80'	Stadium: Stade Municipal Pierre-Aliker; Referee: Javier Santos (Puerto Rico)

6 September 2014 2014 Caribbean Cup Q	Bonaire	3–2	Suriname	Fort-de-France, Martinique
	Pauletta 6'; Seinpaal 12'; Barzey 70' (pen.)	Report	Cronie 80' (pen.), 82'	Stadium: Stade Municipal Pierre-Aliker; Referee: Alain Georges (Haiti)

8 September 2014 2014 Caribbean Cup Q	Martinique	0–0	Suriname	Fort-de-France, Martinique
		Report		Stadium: Stade Municipal Pierre-Aliker

== 2015 ==
30 January 2015 ABCS Tournament	Suriname	3–0	Bonaire	Paramaribo, Suriname
	Vallei 9'; Pokie 36'; Cronie 87'	Report		Stadium: Dr. Ir. Franklin Essed Stadion

1 February 2015 ABCS Tournament	Suriname	1–0	Aruba	Paramaribo, Suriname
	Cronie 85'	Report		Stadium: Dr. Ir. Franklin Essed Stadion

30 April 2015 Friendly	Suriname	1–0	Guyana	Paramaribo, Suriname
	G.Rigters 24'	Report		Stadium: André Kamperveen Stadion

8 June 2015 2018 World Cup Q	Nicaragua	1–0	Suriname	Managua, Nicaragua
	Chavarria 44'	Report		Stadium: Estadio Nacional Dennis Martínez; Referee: Javier Santos (Puerto Rico)

27 March 2015 2018 World Cup Q	Suriname	1–3	Nicaragua	Paramaribo, Suriname
	R. Fer 3'	Report	Leguías 25'; Rosas 50'; Chavarria 90'	Stadium: André Kamperveen Stadion; Referee: Leon Clarke (Saint Lucia)

== 2016 ==
21 February 2016 Friendly	Guyana	2–0	Suriname	Georgetown, Guyana
	Richardson 18', 74'	Report		Stadium: Providence Stadium

25 February 2016 Friendly	French Guiana	2–3	Suriname	Cayenne, French Guiana
	Toupouti 70', 88'	Report	R. Fer 20'; Kisoor 37'; V. Pinas 48'	Stadium: Stade Municipal Dr. Edmard Lama

23 March 2016 2017 Caribbean Cup qualification	Guadeloupe	0–0 (a.e.t.) (3–2 p)	Suriname	Les Abymes, Guadeloupe
20:00 UTC−4		Report		Stadium: Stade René Serge Nabajoth; Referee: Adzer Ariznat (Haiti)
	Penalties
	Milon (penalty scored); Beauvue (penalty scored); Alphonse (penalty missed); Laurence (penalty scored); Babel (penalty missed)		(penalty scored) Rijssel; (penalty missed) Baja; (penalty missed) Talea; (penalty scored) Eind; (penalty missed) Kohinor

29 March 2016 2017 Caribbean Cup qualification	Suriname	3–2	Guadeloupe	Paramaribo, Suriname
16:30 UTC−3	Rijssel 30', 36'; Kisoor 41'	Report	Beauvue 15'; Nabab 32'	Stadium: André Kamperveen Stadion; Referee: Wilson Da Costa (Bahamas)

1 June 2016 2017 Caribbean Cup qualification	Saint Kitts and Nevis	1–0	Suriname	Basseterre, Saint Kitts and Nevis
20:00 UTC−4	Panayiotou 30'	Report		Stadium: Warner Park Sporting Complex; Referee: Bryan Willett (Antigua and Barbuda)

4 June 2016 2017 Caribbean Cup qualification	Suriname	2–1	Saint Vincent and the Grenadines	Paramaribo, Suriname
16:00 UTC−3	Kisoor 85'; Valies 90+4'	Report	Samuel 71'	Stadium: André Kamperveen Stadion; Referee: Karl Tyrell (Jamaica)

8 October 2016 2017 Caribbean Cup qualification	Suriname	3–2 (a.e.t.)	Guyana	Paramaribo, Suriname
16:30 UTC−3	Kisoor 58'; Talea 103'; Rozenblad 110'	Report	Barrington 4'; McKenzie-Lyle 120'	Stadium: André Kamperveen Stadion; Referee: Dwight Royal (Jamaica)

13 November 2016 (Note: The Jamaica v Suriname match, originally scheduled on 5 October 2016, 20:00 UTC−5, was rescheduled due to safety concerns regarding Hurricane Matthew.) 2017 Caribbean Cup qualification	Jamaica	1–0	Suriname	Kingston, Jamaica
20:00 UTC−5	Burke 16'	Report		Stadium: Anthony Spaulding Sports Complex; Referee: Wilson Da Costa (Bahamas)

== 2017 ==
4 January 2017 2017 Caribbean Cup qualification	Trinidad and Tobago	1–2 (a.e.t.)	Suriname	Couva, Trinidad and Tobago
19:00 UTC−4	Charles 82'	Report	Kwasie 76'; Rozenblad 110'	Stadium: Ato Boldon Stadium; Referee: Kimbell Ward (Saint Kitts and Nevis)

6 January 2017 2017 Caribbean Cup qualification	Suriname	2–4	Haiti	Couva, Trinidad and Tobago
19:00 UTC−4	Apai 87'; Eduard 90+1'	Report	Hérold 25'; Jean-Baptiste 42'; Désiré 48'; Faerber 80' (o.g.)	Stadium: Ato Boldon Stadium; Referee: Michel Rodríguez (Cuba)

== 2018 ==
6 September 2018 2019–20 CONCACAF Nations League Q	Dominica	0–0	Suriname	Les Abymes, Guadeloupe
16:00		Report		Stadium: Stade René Serge Nabajoth (Note: Dominica played their home match against Suriname in Guadeloupe.); Referee: Tristley Bassue (Saint Kitts and Nevis)

13 October 2018 2019–20 CONCACAF Nations League Q	Suriname	5–0	British Virgin Islands	Paramaribo, Suriname
18:30 (19:30 UTC−3)	Rijssel 23', 76'; Elshot 43'; D. Fer 66'; Comvalius 82'	Report		Stadium: André Kamperveen Stadion; Referee: Bryan López (Guatemala)

17 November 2018 2019–20 CONCACAF Nations League Q	Jamaica	2–1	Suriname	Montego Bay, Jamaica
19:00	Burke 7'; Mattocks 16' (pen.)	Report	D. Fer 36'	Stadium: Montego Bay Sports Complex; Referee: Tristley Bassue (Saint Kitts and Nevis)

== 2019 ==
19 March 2019 Friendly	Suriname	3–1	Guyana	Nieuw Nickerie, Suriname
20:30 UTC−3	Rijssel 22' (pen.); Comvalius 32'; Moore 40' (o.g.)	Report	Benjamin 60'	Stadium: Ashraf Pierkhan Stadion; Referee: Johannes Dolaini (Suriname)

23 March 2019 2019–20 CONCACAF Nations League Q	Suriname	2–0	Saint Kitts and Nevis	Paramaribo, Suriname
18:30 (19:30 UTC−3)	Rijssel 38'; Comvalius 71'	Report		Stadium: André Kamperveen Stadion; Referee: Erick Lezama (Nicaragua)

5 September 2019 2019–20 CONCACAF Nations League B	Dominica	1–2	Suriname	Roseau, Dominica
15:00		Report	G. Vlijter 7', 90'	Stadium: Windsor Park; Referee: Jamar Springer (Barbados)

8 September 2019 2019–20 CONCACAF Nations League B	Suriname	6–0	Nicaragua	Paramaribo, Suriname
18:00 (19:00 UTC−3)	G. Vlijter 9', 11', 30', 65'; D. Fer 13'; Comvalius 85'	Report		Stadium: André Kamperveen Stadion; Referee: Bryan López (Guatemala)

11 October 2019 2019–20 CONCACAF Nations League B	Saint Vincent and the Grenadines	2–2	Suriname	Arnos Vale, Saint Vincent and the Grenadines
15:00	Stewart 58', 90+5' (pen.)	Report	G. Vlijter 26', 53'	Stadium: Arnos Vale Stadium; Referee: Walter López (Guatemala)

14 October 2019 2019–20 CONCACAF Nations League B	Suriname	0–1	Saint Vincent and the Grenadines	Paramaribo, Suriname
19:00 (20:00 UTC−3)		Report	Stewart 68'	Stadium: André Kamperveen Stadion; Referee: Oliver Vergara (Panama)

15 November 2019 2019–20 CONCACAF Nations League B	Suriname	4–0	Dominica	Paramaribo, Suriname
19:30 (21:30 UTC−3)	Apai 15', 88'; G. Vlijter 60', 74'	Report		Stadium: André Kamperveen Stadion; Referee: Sherwin Johnson (Guyana)

18 November 2019 2019–20 CONCACAF Nations League B	Nicaragua	1–2	Suriname	Managua, Nicaragua
22:00 (21:00 UTC−6)	Fuentes 60'	Report	Comvalius 21'; Hasselbaink 53'	Stadium: Nicaragua National Football Stadium; Referee: Patrick Senecharles (Haiti)

== 2020 ==
29 March 2020 Friendly	Suriname	Canceled	Grenada	Paramaribo, Suriname
				Stadium: Dr. Ir. Franklin Essed Stadion

== 2021 ==
24 March 2021 2022 FIFA World Cup Qualifier	Suriname	3–0	Cayman Islands	Paramaribo, Suriname
19:00 UTC−3	S. Pinas 22'; Donk 38' (pen.); G. Vlijter 76'	Report		Stadium: Dr. Ir. Franklin Essed Stadion; Referee: Jorge Pérez (Mexico)

27 March 2021 2022 FIFA World Cup Qualifier	Aruba	0–6	Suriname	Bradenton, United States
20:00 UTC−4		Report	Hasselbaink 19', 37', 55'; Croes 27' (o.g.); Jozefzoon 70'; Alberg 74'	Stadium: IMG Academy; Referee: Ismail Elfath (United States)

4 June 2021 2022 FIFA World Cup Qualifier	Suriname	6–0	Bermuda	Paramaribo, Suriname
19:00 UTC−3	Becker 3', 36'; Hasselbaink 15', 37', 65'; S. Pinas 74'	Report		Stadium: Dr. Ir. Franklin Essed Stadion; Referee: Mario Escobar (Guatemala)

8 June 2021 2022 FIFA World Cup Qualifier	Canada	4–0	Suriname	Bridgeview, United States
20:05 UTC−5	Davies 37'; David 59', 73', 77' (pen.)	Report		Stadium: SeatGeek Stadium; Referee: Nima Saghafi (United States)

12 July 2021 2021 CONCACAF Gold Cup	Jamaica	2–0	Suriname	Orlando, United States
18:30 UTC−4	Nicholson 6'; De Cordova-Reid 26'	Report		Stadium: Exploria Stadium; Attendance: 6,403; Referee: Bakary Gassama (Gambia)

16 July 2021 2021 CONCACAF Gold Cup	Suriname	1–2	Costa Rica	Orlando, United States
20:30 UTC−4	Vlijter 54'	Report	Campbell 58'; Borges 59'	Stadium: Exploria Stadium; Referee: Fernando Hernández (Mexico)

20 July 2021 2021 CONCACAF Gold Cup	Suriname	2–1	Guadeloupe	Houston, United States
18:00 UTC−5	Vlijter 14'; Hasselbaink 79'	Report	Phaeton 20'	Stadium: BBVA Stadium; Referee: Fernando Guerrero (Mexico)

== 2022 ==
28 January 2022 Friendly	Suriname	1–0	Barbados	Paramaribo, Suriname
19:00 UTC−3	Rigters 48'	Report		Stadium: Frank Essed Stadion; Referee: Sherwin Johnson (Guyana)

1 February 2022 Friendly	Suriname	2–1	Guyana	Paramaribo, Suriname
20:00 UTC−3	Rigters 13', 52'		Bobb 89'	Stadium: Frank Essed Stadion

27 March 2022 Friendly	Thailand	1–0	Suriname	Pathum Thani, Thailand
19:00 UTC+7	Bordin 27'	Report		Stadium: BG Stadium; Referee: Warintorn Sassadee (Thailand)

22 May 2022 Friendly	French Guiana	3–1	Suriname	Cayenne, French Guiana
18:00 UTC−3	Sarrucco 7', 11'; Kemble 87' (o.g.)		Kohinor 40'	Stadium: Stade Georges-Chaumet

4 June 2022 2022–23 CONCACAF Nations League	Suriname	1–1	Jamaica	Paramaribo, Suriname
20:00 UTC−3	Knight 84' (o.g.)	Report	Flemmings 39'	Stadium: Frank Essed Stadion; Attendance: 3,032; Referee: Selvin Brown (Honduras)

7 June 2022 2022–23 CONCACAF Nations League	Jamaica	3–1	Suriname	Kingston, Jamaica
20:00 UTC−5	Morrison 16'; Flemmings 43'; J. Lowe 70'	Report	Wildschut 21'	Stadium: National Stadium; Referee: Keylor Herrera (Costa Rica)

11 June 2022 2022–23 CONCACAF Nations League	Mexico	3–0	Suriname	Torreón, Mexico
21:00 UTC−5	Reyes 4'; Martín 40' (pen.); Sánchez 90+4'	Report		Stadium: Estadio Corona; Referee: Iván Barton (El Salvador)

22 September 2022 Friendly	Suriname	2–1	Nicaragua	Almere, Netherlands
	Te Vrede 25'; Hilterman 90+1'	Report	Quijano 90'	Stadium: Yanmar Stadion; Referee: Serdar Gözübüyük (Netherlands)

26 September 2022 Hybrid friendly	PEC Zwolle	5–0	Suriname	Zwolle, Netherlands
				Stadium: MAC³PARK Stadion

19 November 2022 Friendly	Suriname	1–3	French Guiana	Paramaribo, Suriname
19:00 UTC−3				Stadium: Frank Essed Stadion

24 November 2022 2022 ABCS Tournament	Suriname	4–1	Bonaire	Willemstad, Curaçao
19:00 UTC−4	Apai 1'; Doorson 25'; Amoeferie 32'; Andro 80'	Report	Seinpaal 74'	Stadium: Stadion Rignaal Jean Francisca

26 November 2022 2022 ABCS Tournament	Suriname	2–2 (5–6 p)	Curaçao	Willemstad, Curaçao
21:00 UTC−4	Wijks 18'; Rigters 72'		Rosa 67'; Martina 96' (pen.)	Stadium: Stadion Rignaal Jean Francisca

== 2023 ==
23 March 2023 2022–23 CONCACAF Nations League	Suriname	0–2	Mexico	Paramaribo, Suriname
21:00 UTC−3		Report	Vásquez 64'; Dankerlui 82' (o.g.)	Stadium: Frank Essed Stadion; Referee: Said Martínez (Honduras)

17 June 2023 2023 Gold Cup qualification	Suriname	0–0 (3–4 p)	Puerto Rico	Fort Lauderdale, United States
19:00 UTC−4		Report		Stadium: DRV PNK Stadium; Referee: Joseph Dickerson (United States)
	Penalties
	Chery (penalty scored); Jozefzoon (penalty scored); Pinas (penalty missed); te Vrede (penalty missed); Abena (penalty scored)		(penalty scored) R. Rivera; (penalty missed) Servania; (penalty scored) Antonetti; (penalty scored) Ydrach; (penalty scored) G. Díaz
Note: Puerto Rico advance on penalties 4–3

8 September 2023 2023–24 Nations League	Grenada	1–1	Suriname	St. George's, Grenada
19:00 UTC−4	Lewis 85'	Report	Te Vrede 87'	Stadium: Kirani James Athletic Stadium; Referee: Kwinsi Williams (Trinidad and Tobago)

12 September 2023 2023–24 Nations League	Cuba	1–0	Suriname	Santiago de Cuba, Cuba
16:00 UTC−4	Pozo 21'	Report		Stadium: Estadio Antonio Maceo; Referee: Fernando Guerrero (Mexico)

12 October 2023 2023–24 Nations League	Suriname	1–1	Haiti	Paramaribo, Suriname
19:00 UTC−3	Haps 17'	Report	Cantave 51'	Stadium: Dr. Ir. Franklin Essed Stadion; Referee: Víctor Cáceres (Mexico)

15 October 2023 2023–24 Nations League	Suriname	4–0	Grenada	Paramaribo, Suriname
21:00 UTC−3	Van der Kust 12'; Vlijter 27'; Abena 35'; Bedeau 45+3' (o.g.)	Report		Stadium: Frank Essed Stadion; Attendance: 1,285; Referee: Daneon Parchment (Jamaica)

== 2024 ==
24 March 2024 Friendly	Suriname	1–1	Martinique	Almere, The Netherlands
	Lonwijk 36'		Labeau 12'	Stadium: Yanmar Stadion

5 June 2024 2026 FIFA World Cup qualification	Suriname	4–1	Saint Vincent and the Grenadines	Paramaribo, Suriname
18:00 UTC−3	Becker 39' (pen.); Hilterman 45+2'; Lonwijk 46'; Montnor 70'	Report (FIFA); Report (CONCACAF)	Anderson 31'	Stadium: Frank Essed Stadion; Attendance: 3,220; Referee: Joe Dickerson (United States)

8 June 2024 2026 FIFA World Cup qualification	Anguilla	0–4	Suriname	The Valley, Anguilla
		Report (FIFA); Report (CONCACAF)	Conraad 10', 75'; Pinas 62'; Austin 88' (o.g.)	Stadium: Raymond E. Guishard Stadium; Attendance: 600; Referee: Hakeem Harvey (Saint Kitts and Nevis)

5 September 2024 2024–25 CONCACAF Nations League	Guyana	1–3	Suriname	Leonora, Guyana
	Glasgow 43' (pen.)	Report	Van der Kust 18'; Montnor 66'; Misidjan 83'	Stadium: Synthetic Track and Field Facility; Referee: Christopher Mason (Jamaica)

9 September 2024 2024–25 CONCACAF Nations League	Guadeloupe	1–0	Suriname	Le Gosier, Guadeloupe
	Leborgne 67'	Report		Stadium: Stade Roger Zami; Referee: Reon Radix (Grenada)

11 October 2024 2024–25 CONCACAF Nations League	Suriname	1–1	Costa Rica	Paramaribo, Suriname
	Vlijter 34'	Report	Alcócer 12'	Stadium: Frank Essed Stadion; Referee: Adonai Escobedo (Mexico)

15 October 2024 2024–25 CONCACAF Nations League	Suriname	5–1	Guyana	Paramaribo, Suriname
	Becker 3', 10'; Misidjan 33'; Jubitana 51'; Haps 69'	Report	J. Jones 13'	Stadium: Frank Essed Stadion; Attendance: 3,274; Referee: Steffon Dewar (Jamaica)

15 November 2024 2024–25 CONCACAF Nations League QF	Suriname	0-1	Canada	Paramaribo, Suriname
				Stadium: Frank Essed Stadion

19 November 2024 2024–25 CONCACAF Nations League QF	Canada	3-0	Suriname	Toronto, Canada
				Stadium: BMO Field

== 2025 ==
21 March 2025 2025 CONCACAF Gold Cup qualification	Suriname	1–0	Martinique	Paramaribo, Suriname
	Kerk 52'	Report		Stadium: Dr. Ir. Franklin Essed Stadion; Attendance: 2,748; Referee: Víctor Cáceres (Mexico)

25 March 2025 2025 CONCACAF Gold Cup qualification	Martinique	0–1	Suriname	Fort-de-France, Martinique
		Report	Pherai 80'	Stadium: Stade Pierre-Aliker; Referee: José Torres (Puerto Rico)

6 June 2025 2026 FIFA World Cup qualification	Suriname	1-0	Puerto Rico	Paramaribo, Suriname
	Montnor 79'			Stadium: Frank Essed Stadion; Attendance: 3,300; Referee: Nelson Salgado (Honduras)

10 June 2025 2026 FIFA World Cup qualification	El Salvador	1–1	Suriname	San Salvador, El Salvador
19:00 UTC−6	Gil 32'	Report	Lonwijk 19'	Stadium: Estadio Cuscatlán; Referee: Jon Freemon (United States)

15 June 2025 2025 CONCACAF Gold Cup GS	Costa Rica	4–3	Suriname	San Diego, United States
20:00 UTC−7	Martínez 14'; Ugalde 19' (pen.), 90+13' (pen.); Alcócer 76'		Kerk 34'; Margaret 59'; Pinas 64' (pen.)	Stadium: Snapdragon Stadium; Referee: Joe Dickerson (United States)

18 June 2025 2025 CONCACAF Gold Cup GS	Suriname	0–2	Mexico	Arlington, United States
21:00 UTC−5		Report	Montes 57', 63'	Stadium: AT&T Stadium; Attendance: 34,015; Referee: Selvin Brown(Honduras)

22 June 2025 2025 CONCACAF Gold Cup GS	Dominican Republic	0–0	Suriname	Arlington, United States
21:00 UTC−5		Report		Stadium: AT&T Stadium; Attendance: 20,918; Referee: Ismael Cornejo (El Salvador)

4 September 2025 2026 FIFA World Cup qualification	Suriname	0–0	Panama	Paramaribo, Suriname
18:30 UTC−3		Report		Stadium: Franklin Essed Stadion; Attendance: 2,685; Referee: Kwinsi Williams (Trinidad and Tobago)

8 September 2025 2026 FIFA World Cup qualification	El Salvador	1–2	Suriname	San Salvador, El Salvador
	Dijksteel 73' (o.g.)	Report	Balker 12'; Klas 81'	Stadium: Estadio Cuscatlán; Referee: Adonai González (Mexico)

10 October 2026 FIFA World Cup qualification	Suriname	1–1	Guatemala	Paramaribo, Suriname
18:00 UTC−3	Misidjan 90+4'	Report	75' Lom	Stadium: Franklin Essed Stadion; Attendance: 3,476; Referee: Fernando Hernández (Mexico)

14 October 2026 FIFA World Cup qualification	Panama	1–1	Suriname	Panama City, Panama
20:00 UTC−5	Díaz 90+6'	Report	21' Margaret	Stadium: Estadio Rommel Fernández; Attendance: 21,862; Referee: Selvin Brown (Honduras)

13 November 2026 FIFA World Cup qualification	Suriname	4–0	El Salvador	Paramaribo, Suriname
19:00 UTC−3	Chery 44' (pen.); Margaret 74', 76'; Klas 83'	Report		Stadium: Franklin Essed Stadion; Referee: Oshane Nation (Jamaica)

18 November 2026 FIFA World Cup qualification	Guatemala	3–1	Suriname	Guatemala City, Guatemala
19:00 UTC−6	Lom 49'; Escobar 57'; Santis 65'	Report	Samayoa 90+3' (o.g.)	Stadium: Estadio Manuel Felipe Carrera; Referee: Juan Calderón (Costa Rica)

== 2026 ==
26 March 2026 FIFA World Cup inter-confederation play-offs	Bolivia	2–1	Suriname	Monterrey, Mexico
16:00 UTC−6	Paniagua 72'; Terceros 79' (pen.)	Report	Van Gelderen 48'	Stadium: Estadio BBVA; Attendance: 33,547; Referee: Alireza Faghani (Australia)

25 September 2026 2026–27 Nations League	Honduras	2–3	Suriname	Tegucigalpa, Honduras
19:00 UTC−5	Moncada 20'; Róchez 23'	Report	Lonwijk 18'; Jubitana 39'; Palma 66' (o.g.)	Stadium: Estadio Nacional Chelato Uclés; Referee: Fernando Hernández (Mexico); Record: 1–2–1 (6:6)

28 September 2026 2026–27 Nations League	Suriname	v	Martinique	Paramaribo, Suriname
19:00 UTC−3		Report		Stadium: Frank Essed Stadion

2 October 2026 2026–27 Nations League	Suriname	v	Guatemala	Paramaribo, Suriname
19:00 UTC−3		Report		Stadium: Frank Essed Stadion

5 October 2026 2026–27 Nations League	Guatemala	v	Suriname	Guatemala, Guatemala
18:00 UTC−6		Report		Stadium: Estadio Manuel Felipe Carrera

See also: FIFA International Match Calendar
