= Bonaire national football team results =

In April 2013, the Bonaire Football Federation was granted associate membership in CONCACAF and was promoted to full membership in June 2014. Bonaire also became a full member of the Caribbean Football Union in 2013.

These are the official fixtures, results, and statistics of the Bonaire national football team after being accepted into CONCACAF. Unofficial internationals played by the team before obtaining CONCACAF membership are not included.

== Overview of results ==
As of 5 October 2026

Type	Record						
Type	G	W	D	L	GF	GA	Win %
Friendly Matches	3	0	0	1	1	6	0
Caribbean Cup	5	2	1	2	6	13	40
CONCACAF Nations League	24	9	3	12	29	41	37.5
CONCACAF Series	4	1	0	3	6	9	25
ABCS Tournament	8	2	0	6	8	19	25
Total	44	14	4	26	52	89	31.82

== International matches ==
As of 26 March 2019

=== 2013 ===
15 November 2013 2013 ABCS Tournament	Suriname	2–0	Bonaire	Willemstad, Curaçao
	Talea 20'; Apai 61'	Report		Stadium: Ergilio Hato Stadium

16 November 2013 2013 ABCS Tournament	Bonaire	2–1	Aruba	Willemstad, Curaçao
	I. Piar 74'; Barzey 76'	Report	Escalona 43'	Stadium: Ergilio Hato Stadium

=== 2014 ===
1 June 2014 2014 CC qualification	Bonaire	2–1	U.S. Virgin Islands	Lookout, Montserrat
	Seinpaal 5'; Beaumont 10'	Report	Taylor, Jr. 87'	Stadium: Blakes Estate Stadium

3 June 2014 2014 CC qualification	Montserrat	0–0	Bonaire	Lookout, Montserrat
		Report		Stadium: Blakes Estate Stadium; Referee: Bryan Willett (Antigua and Barbuda)

3 September 2014 2014 CC qualification	Martinique	6–0	Bonaire	Fort-de-France, Martinique
20:00	Germany 34', 50', 60'; Coureur 75'; Goron 80', 90+2'	Report		Stadium: Stade d'Honneur de Dillon; Referee: Walner Laventure (Haiti)

5 September 2014 2014 CC qualification	Bonaire	3–2	Suriname	Rivière-Pilote, Martinique
18:00	Pauletta 6'; Seinpaal 12'; Barzey 70' (pen.)	Report	Cronie 80' (pen.), 82'	Stadium: Stade En Camée; Referee: Alain Georges (Haiti)

7 September 2014 2014 CC qualification	Barbados	4–1	Bonaire	Fort-de-France, Martinique
16:00	Boyce 55'; Harewood 67'; Harte 74', 76'	Report	Seinpaal 90' (pen.)	Stadium: Stade Pierre-Aliker; Referee: Javier Santos (Puerto Rico)

=== 2015 ===
30 January 2015 2015 ABCS Tournament	Suriname	3–0	Bonaire	Paramaribo, Suriname
21:00 (UTC) -3	Vallei; Pokie; Cronie	report		Stadium: Franklin Essed Stadium

1 February 2015 2015 ABCS Tournament	Bonaire	1–4	Curaçao	Paramaribo, Suriname
16:00 (UTC) -3	Barzey 85'	Report	Winklaar; Winklaar; Martina; Martina	Stadium: Franklin Essed Stadium; Referee: Ricky de Leca (Aruba)

=== 2018 ===
9 September 2018 2019–20 CNLQ	Bonaire	0–5	Dominican Republic	Willemstad, Curaçao
16:00		Report	Peralta 66', 75', 88'; López 86'; Heredia 90+1'	Stadium: Ergilio Hato Stadium; Referee: Patrick Senecharles (Haiti)

14 October 2018 2019–20 CNLQ	Bonaire	0–6	Jamaica	Willemstad, Curaçao
18:00		Report	Burke 14'; Morris 43', 51'; Gordon 48'; Vassell 58'; Kelly 81'	Stadium: Ergilio Hato Stadium; Referee: Sherwin Moore (Guyana)

=== 2019 ===
21 March 2019 2019–20 CNLQ	Saint Vincent and the Grenadines	2–1	Bonaire	Arnos Vale, Saint Vincent and the Grenadines
15:00	Windster 77' (o.g.); Cunningham 79'	Report	Koffy 37'	Stadium: Arnos Vale Stadium; Referee: José Raúl Torres (Puerto Rico)

24 March 2019 2019–20 CNLQ	British Virgin Islands	1–2	Bonaire	The Valley, Anguilla
15:00	Wilson 76' (pen.)	Report	Windster 7', 88'	Stadium: Raymond E. Guishard Technical Centre; Referee: Kevin Morrison (Jamaica)

6 September 2019 2019–20 CNL	Bonaire	4–2	British Virgin Islands	Willemstad, Curaçao
15:00	Martha 74', 83'; Seinpaal 78'; Trinidad 81'	Report	Forbes 32', 90+2'	Stadium: Stadion Ergilio Hato

9 September 2019 2019–20 CNL	Bahamas	2–1	Bonaire	Nassau, Bahamas
18:00	Hall 49'; Hepple 78'	Report	Seinpaal 90+2'	Stadium: Thomas Robinson Stadium; Referee: Ricangel De Leça (Aruba)

13 October 2019 2019–20 CNL	British Virgin Islands	3–4	Bonaire	Basseterre, Saint Kitts and Nevis
15:00	Rowe 45+3'; Forbes 65'; Wiltshire 84'	Report	Cicilia 25' (pen.); R. Janga 88'; Medway 90+3' (o.g.); Koffy 90+5'	Stadium: Warner Park; Referee: Moeth Gaymes (Saint Vincent and the Grenadines)

17 November 2019 2019–20 CNL	Bonaire	1–1	Bahamas	Willemstad, Curaçao
15:00	Piar 44'	Report	Delancy 36'	Stadium: Stadion Ergilio Hato; Referee: Walter López (Guatemala)

=== 2021 ABCS Tournament ===
1 October 2021 2021 ABCS Tournament	Curaçao U20	3–4	Bonaire	Willemstad, Curaçao
	Reuel Martina 7'; Rayden Winklaar 21'; Quinhaindri Bibiana 63'	Report	Jermaine Windster 27'; Yurick Seinpaal 3', 77'; Fabio Hierck 55'	Stadium: FFK Stadium

3 October 2021 2021 ABCS Tournament	Curaçao	1–0	Bonaire	Willemstad, Curaçao
	Rudrick Pop 76'	Report		Stadium: FFK Stadium

=== 2022 ===
3 June 2022–23 CNL	Turks and Caicos Islands	1–4	Bonaire	Providenciales, Turks and Caicos Islands
16:30 UTC−4	Shand Jr. 86'	Report	Cicilia 5', 16', 80'; Libania 57'	Stadium: TCIFA National Academy; Referee: Ken Pennyfeather (Antigua and Barbuda)

6 June 2022–23 CNL	Bonaire	2–2	Sint Maarten	Willemstad, Curaçao
16:00 UTC−4	Libania 9'; Hoeve 18'	Report	Kerssies 27'; Hoeve 32' (o.g.)	Stadium: Stadion Rignaal Jean Francisca; Referee: Ricangel de Leça (Aruba)

11 June 2022–23 CNL	U.S. Virgin Islands	0–2	Bonaire	Saint Croix, U.S. Virgin Islands
16:00 UTC−4		Report	Cicilia 81'; Isenia 84'	Stadium: Bethlehem Soccer Stadium; Referee: Marcos de Oliveira (United States)

14 June 2022–23 CNL	Bonaire	2–0	U.S. Virgin Islands	Willemstad, Curaçao
16:00 UTC−4	Cicilia 4'; Sonnenschein 33'	Report		Stadium: Stadion Rignaal Jean Francisca; Referee: Katia García (Mexico)

24 November 2022 ABCS Tournament	Suriname	4–1	Bonaire	Willemstad, Curaçao
19:00 UTC−4	Apai 1'; Doorson 25'; Amoeferie 32'; Andro 80'	Report	Seinpaal 74'	Stadium: Stadion Rignaal Jean Francisca

26 November 2022 ABCS Tournament	Bonaire	0–1	Aruba	Willemstad, Curaçao
19:00 UTC−4		Report	Gross 17'	Stadium: Stadion Rignaal Jean Francisca

=== 2023 ===
25 March 2022–23 CNL	Sint Maarten	6–1	Bonaire	Saint Croix, US Virgin Islands
16:00	De Vries 5'; Lake 9', 55', 84' (pen.); Amatkarijo 46'; Illidge 62'	Report	Montero 69'	Stadium: Bethlehem Soccer Stadium; Referee: Nima Saghafi (United States)

28 March 2022–23 CNL	Bonaire	1–2	Turks and Caicos Islands	Rincon, Bonaire
19:00	Montero 2'	Report	Forbes 18', 40'	Stadium: Stadion Antonio Trenidat; Referee: Kwinsi Williams (Trinidad and Tobago)

11 September 2023–24 Nations League C	Saint Martin	2–1	Bonaire	Basseterre, Saint Kitts and Nevis
19:00	Raga 75'; Casper 88' (o.g.)	Report	Martinus 67'	Stadium: SKNFA Technical Center; Referee: Reginald Gumbs (Saint Kitts and Nevis)

12 October 2023–24 Nations League C	Bonaire	2–0	Anguilla	Rincon, Bonaire
19:00	Ronde 10'; Pourier 36'	Report		Stadium: Stadion Antonio Trenidat; Attendance: 660; Referee: Norberto da Silva (Curaçao)

18 November 2023–24 Nations League C	Anguilla	0–3	Bonaire	The Valley, Anguilla
14:00		Report	Anthony 2', 6' (pen.); Michiel 73'	Stadium: Raymond E. Guishard Technical Centre; Attendance: 267; Referee: Tristley Bassue (Saint Kitts and Nevis)

21 November 2023–24 Nations League C	Bonaire	0–4	Saint Martin	Rincon, Bonaire
18:00		Report	Gentes 3', 45+2'; Lebon 13'; Richardson 46'	Stadium: Stadion Antonio Trenidat; Referee: Ricangel de Leça (Aruba)

=== 2024 ===
4 June Friendly	Bonaire	1-3	Sint Maarten	Doorwerth, Netherlands
20:00				Stadium: Sportpark De Waayenberg

5 September 2024–25 Nations League	Bonaire	1–1	Saint Vincent and the Grenadines	Rincon, Bonaire
21:00 UTC−6	Hoeve 36'	Report	Pierre 39'	Stadium: Stadion Antonio Trenidat; Referee: Jon Freeman ( United States)

8 September 2024–25 Nations League	El Salvador	2–1	Bonaire	Rincon, Bonaire
21:00 UTC−6	Quincy Hoeve 45+3' (o.g.); Emerson Mauricio 60'	Report	Jort van der Sande 90+1'	Stadium: Stadion Antonio Trenidat; Referee: Steven Madrigal (Costa Rica)

10 October 2024–25 Nations League	Bonaire	0–1	Montserrat	Kingstown, Saint Vincent
22:00 UTC−6			Lyle Taylor 48' (pen.)	Stadium: Arnos Vale Stadium

13 October 2024–25 Nations League	Montserrat	0–1	Bonaire	Kingstown, Saint Vincent
21:00 UTC−6			Ayrton Cecilia 28'	Stadium: Arnos Vale Stadium

14 November 2024–25 Nations League	Bonaire	0–1	El Salvador	San Salvador, El Salvador
19:00 UTC−6		Report	Vásquez 83'	Stadium: Estadio Cuscatlán; Referee: Steven Madrigal (Costa Rica)

17 November 2024–25 Nations League	Saint Vincent and the Grenadines	3–1	Bonaire	San Salvador, El Salvador
	Spring 19', 82'; Edwards 67'	Report	Yorke 75' (o.g.)	Stadium: Estadio Cuscatlán; Referee: José Torres (Puerto Rico)

=== 2025 ===
25 March Friendly	Niger	6–0	Bonaire	Casablanca, Morocco
				Stadium: Père Jégo Stadium

12 November 2025–26 CONCACAF Series	Barbados	3–2	Bonaire	North Sound, Antigua and Barbuda
16:00 UTC−4		Report	Cicilia; Gerardo-Felicia	Stadium: Sir Vivian Richards Stadium

15 November 2025–26 CONCACAF Series	Guyana	2–1	Bonaire	North Sound, Antigua and Barbuda
	Duke-McKenna 5'; De Rosario 77'	Report (GFA); Report (BFF)	Clijdesdale 16'	Stadium: Sir Vivian Richards Stadium

=== 2026 ===
26 March 2025–26 CONCACAF Series	Bonaire	3–1	Saint Vincent and the Grenadines	Rincon, Bonaire
20:30 UTC−4	Koorn 39'; Christopher 57' (o.g.); Isenia 77' (pen.)	Report	Pierre 37'	Stadium: Stadion Antonio Trenidat; Referee: Norberto da Silva (Curaçao)

29 March 2025–26 CONCACAF Series	Bonaire	0–3	Saint Martin	Rincon, Bonaire
20:30 UTC−4	Oleana (red card) 87'	Report	Alexandre 39'; Léo 51'; Denis 68'	Stadium: Stadion Antonio Trenidat

6 June 2026 Friendly	Bonaire	0–2	British Virgin Islands	Malaga, Spain
19:00			Bertie; Chalwell

== Record versus other nations ==
As of 5 October 2026, includes only matches against senior national teams after CONCACAF acceptance

Opponents	P	W	D	L	GF	GA	GD	Win %
Anguilla	2	2	0	0	5	0	+5	100.00
Aruba	1	1	0	0	2	1	+1	100.00
Bahamas	2	0	1	1	1	2	−1	0.00
Barbados	2	0	0	2	3	7	−4	0.00
British Virgin Islands	4	3	0	1	10	8	+2	75.00
Cuba	1	0	0	1	0	2	−2	0.00
Curaçao	2	0	0	2	1	5	−4	0.00
Dominican Republic	1	0	0	1	0	5	−5	0.00
El Salvador	2	0	0	2	1	3	−2	0.00
Grenada	2	1	0	1	6	4	+2	50.00
Guyana	1	0	0	1	1	2	−1	0.00
Jamaica	1	0	0	1	0	6	−6	0.00
Martinique	1	0	0	1	0	6	−6	0.00
Montserrat	3	1	1	1	1	1	+0	33.33
Saint Martin	3	0	0	3	1	9	−8	0.00
Saint Kitts and Nevis	1	0	0	1	1	2	−1	0.00
Saint Vincent and the Grenadines	4	1	1	2	6	7	−1	25.00
Sint Maarten	2	0	1	1	3	8	−5	0.00
Suriname	3	1	0	2	3	7	−4	33.33
Turks and Caicos Islands	2	1	0	1	5	3	+2	50.00
U.S. Virgin Islands	1	1	0	0	2	1	+1	100.00
Total	42	12	5	25	54	91	−37	28.57
