= 2021–22 Aruban Division di Honor =

Aruban Division di Honor
- Season: 2021–22
- Dates: 22 October 2021 – 25 June 2022
- Champions: Dakota; 17th title
- Relegated: Bubali
- Caribbean Cup: Dakota
- Matches: 26
- Goals: 433 (16.65 per match)
- Top goalscorer: (Colombia) Devis Oliveros (27 goals)
- Biggest home win: 9 goals: RCA 9–0 Caravel (5 March 2022)
- Biggest away win: 11 goals: Caravel 0–11 Nacional (1 May 2022)
- Highest scoring: 11 goals: Caravel 0–11 Nacional (1 May 2022)

The 2021–22 Aruban Division di Honor was the 61st season of the Division di Honor, the top division football competition in Aruba. The season began on 22 October 2021 and concluded on 25 June 2022.

== Teams ==
=== Stadiums and locations ===
Club	Location	Venue	Capacity	2020–21 position
Bubali	Noord	Bubali Stadium	1,000	8th
Britannia	Piedra Plat	Franklyn Bareño Sports Complex	500	5th
Caravel	Santa Cruz/Angochi	Caravel Stadium	800	7th
Dakota	Oranjestad	Guillermo P. Trinidad Stadium	5,500	2nd
Estrella	Santa Cruz	Estrella Stadium	1,000	6th
La Fama	Savaneta	La Fama Stadium	1,100	3rd
Nacional	Palm Beach	Deportivo Nacional Stadium	1,000	4th
RCA	Oranjestad	Guillermo P. Trinidad Stadium	5,500	1st
River Plate	Oranjestad	Guillermo P. Trinidad Stadium	5,500	D1, 1st
United	Noord	Guillermo P. Trinidad Stadium	5,500	D1, 2nd

== Table ==
=== Regular season ===
Pos	Team	Pld	W	D	L	GF	GA	GD	Pts	Qualification or relegation
1	Dakota (C)	18	15	0	3	76	16	+60	45	Advance to Caya 4
2	RCA	18	13	5	0	69	11	+58	44	Advance to Caya 4
3	Britannia	18	10	4	4	46	23	+23	34	Advance to Caya 4
4	La Fama	18	10	2	6	36	28	+8	32	Advance to Caya 4
5	Nacional	18	9	3	6	68	34	+34	30	
6	Caravel	18	7	3	8	29	56	−27	24	
7	River Plate	18	6	2	10	35	42	−7	20	
8	Estrella	18	4	2	12	31	65	−34	14	Advance to Relegation playoff
9	United	18	3	2	13	35	74	−39	11	Advance to Relegation playoff
10	Bubali (R)	18	1	1	16	8	84	−76	4	Relegation to Division Uno

Source: RSSSF
(C) Champions; (R) Relegated

==== Caya 4 ====
Table

Pos	Team	Pld	W	D	L	GF	GA	GD	Pts	Qualification
1	Dakota	6	5	0	1	19	6	+13	15	Advance to Championship final
2	RCA	6	4	1	1	14	9	+5	13	Advance to Championship final
3	La Fama	6	1	1	4	7	15	−8	4	
4	Britannia	6	1	0	5	10	20	−10	3	

Source: RSSSF

===== Championship series =====
18 June 2022 First leg	Dakota	4–2	RCA	Oranjestad
	Peña 35'; Montoya 32' de Sousa 51' (pen.); Hodge 67'	Report	Albert 45'; Silva 90' (pen.)	Stadium: Guillermo P. Trinidad Stadium

22 June 2022 Second leg	RCA	2–2 (4–6 agg.)	Dakota (C)	Oranjestad
	Bergen 63' (pen.), 74' (pen.)	Report	de Sousa 6', 85'	Stadium: Guillermo P. Trinidad Stadium

==== Relegation playoff ====
The 8th and 9th place team in the Honor Division play the 2nd and 3rd place teams in the Division Uno. The top two teams will play in the Honor Division for the 2022–23 season, while the third and fourth place team will play in the Division Uno for the 2022–23 season.

===== Table =====
Pos	Team	Pld	W	D	L	GF	GA	GD	Pts	Qualification or relegation
1	Estrella	3	3	0	0	8	1	+7	9	2022–23 Aruban Division di Honor
2	United	3	1	1	1	4	6	−2	4	2022–23 Aruban Division di Honor
3	Sporting	3	1	0	2	3	4	−1	3	2022–23 Aruban Division Uno
4	Unistars	3	0	1	2	2	7	−5	1	2022–23 Aruban Division Uno

Source: RSSSF

===== Results =====
21 May 2022	Estrella	3–1	Unistars	Oranjestad
				Stadium: Guillermo P. Trinidad Stadium

21 May 2022	United	2–0	Sporting	Oranjestad
				Stadium: Guillermo P. Trinidad Stadium

28 May 2022	United	0–3	Estrella	Oranjestad
				Stadium: Guillermo P. Trinidad Stadium

28 May 2022	Sporting	3–0	Unistars	Oranjestad
				Stadium: Guillermo P. Trinidad Stadium

4 June 2022	Estrella	2–0	Sporting	Oranjestad
				Stadium: Guillermo P. Trinidad Stadium

4 June 2022	Unistars	2–2	United	Oranjestad
				Stadium: Guillermo P. Trinidad Stadium

== Statistics ==
=== Top scorers of the 2021-22 Regular Season ===
Rank	Goalscorer	Club	Goals
1	(Colombia) Devis Oliveros	Nacional	27
2	(Colombia) John Silva	RCA	25
3	(Colombia) Sebastián Montoya	Dakota	23
4	(Aruba) Denrick Lopez	United	17
4	(Aruba) Ricky Hodges	Dakota	17
6	(Jamaica) Albert Francis	RCA	13
7	(Haiti) Fladimy Francois	Nacional	11
7	(Netherlands) Pieter Susebeek	Britannia	11
7	(Venezuela) Fernando de Sousa	Dakota	11
7	(Aruba) Trevor Faro	Estrella	11

Source: FutbolAruba

=== Top scorers of 2021-22 Playoffs ===
Rank	Goalscorer	Club	Goals
1	(Venezuela) Fernando de Sousa	Dakota	6
2	(Colombia) John Silva	RCA	5
3	(Aruba) Erik Santos	RCA	3
3	(Netherlands) Pieter Susebeek	Britannia	3
3	(Netherlands) Daniel Lindscheer	Britannia	3
3	(Aruba) Ricky Hodges	Dakota	3
3	(Colombia) Sebastian Montoya	Dakota	3
3	(Aruba) Juel Balentien	Britannia	3
4	(Aruba) Davidson Kaarsbaan	La Fama	2
4	(Aruba) Jean-Luc Bergen	RCA	2

Source: FutbolAruba
