= Erik Santos de Gouveia =

Aruban footballer

Erik Santos
Personal information
- Full name: Erik Santos Ignasio de Gouveia
- Date of birth: 30 August 1990 (age 36)
- Place of birth: Oranjestad, Aruba
- Height: 1.77 m (5 ft 9 1/2 in)
- Position: Midfielder

Team information
- Current team: RCA (head coach)

Youth career
- 1996: RCA

Senior career*
| Years | Team | Apps | (Gls) |
| 2007-2022 | RCA | 150 | (47) |
| Total | | 0 | (0) |

International career^{‡}
| 2011–2018 | Aruba | 21 | (3) |

Managerial career
- 2025–: RCA
- * Club domestic league appearances and goals ‡ National team caps and goals as of 9 September 2022

Erik Santos Ignasio de Gouveia (born 30 August 1990), known as Erik, is an Aruban former footballer who plays as a midfielder for Aruban Division di Honor club RCA and a member of the Aruba national football team. He played at the 2014 FIFA World Cup qualifier.

== Honours ==
RCA

- Aruban Division di Honor: 2007–08, 2010–11, 2011–12, 2014–15, 2015–16, 2018–19,
- Torneo Copa Betico Croes: 2011-12, 2015-16, 2019-20, 2021-22

Aruba

- ABCS Tournament: 2012

== International goals ==
=== International goals ===
Scores and results list Aruba's goal tally first.

| No | Date | Venue | Opponent | Score | Result | Competition |
|---|---|---|---|---|---|---|
| 1. | 8 July 2011 | Trinidad Stadium, Oranjestad, Aruba | Saint Lucia | 1–0 | 4–2 | 2014 FIFA World Cup qualification |
| 2. | 1 June 2014 | Trinidad Stadium, Oranjestad, Aruba | British Virgin Islands | 7–0 | 7–0 | 2014 Caribbean Cup qualification |
| 3. | 9 September 2018 | Ergilio Hato Stadium, Willemstad, Curaçao | Bermuda | 3–1 | 3–1 | 2019–20 CONCACAF Nations League qualification |
