= ABCS Tournament =

ABCS Tournament ABCS-toernooi Torneo ABCS
- Founded: 2010
- Region: Caribbean (CFU)
- Teams: 4
- Current champions: Curaçao (2nd title)
- Most championships: Suriname (3 titles)
- 2022 ABCS Tournament

The ABCS Tournament is an annual football tournament between the representative teams of Aruba, Bonaire, Curaçao and Suriname.

Louis Giskus, the President of the Suriname Football Federation said that the competition was formed "to strengthen the relationship between the Dutch speaking countries in the Caribbean".

If the scores are level after 90 minutes plus injury time, the game proceeds straight to penalty kicks. No extra time is allocated.

== Venues ==
Stadium	Capacity	Location	Year(s)
Ergilio Hato Stadium	10,000	Willemstad, Curaçao	2010, 2013
Frank Essed Stadion	3,500	Paramaribo, Suriname	2011, 2015
Trinidad Stadium	5,500	Oranjestad, Aruba	2012
Stadion Rignaal 'Jean' Francisca	3,000	Willemstad, Curaçao	2021–2022

== Tournaments ==
Year	Final			Third place match		
Year	Winner	Score	Runner-up	Third place	Score	Fourth place
2010 (Details)	Suriname	2–2 (6−5 p)	Curaçao	Aruba	3–3 (Note: Players of Bonaire walked off the pitch after a disagreement over a penalty kick being given against them)	Bonaire
2011 (Details)	Bonaire	2–2 (4−3 p)	Aruba	Suriname	2–0	Curaçao
2012 (Details)	Aruba	1–0	Suriname	Curaçao	9–2	Bonaire
2013 (Details)	Suriname	3–1	Curaçao	Bonaire	2–1	Aruba
2014	Postponed					
2015 (Details)	Suriname	1–0	Aruba	Curaçao	4–1	Bonaire
2018	Cancelled					
2021 (Details)	Curaçao	1–0	Bonaire	Aruba	2–2 (4−1 p)	Curaçao U-20
2022 (Details)	Curaçao	2–2 (6−5 p)	Suriname	Aruba	1–0	Bonaire

== Teams' achievements ==
	Team	Winners	Runners-up	Third-place	Fourth-place
1	Suriname	3 (2010, 2013, 2015)	2 (2012, 2022)	1 (2011)	
2	Curaçao	2 (2021, 2022)	2 (2010, 2013)	2 (2012, 2015)	1 (2011)
3	Aruba	1 (2012)	2 (2011, 2015)	3 (2010, 2021, 2022)	1 (2013)
4	Bonaire	1 (2011)	1 (2021)	1 (2013)	4 (2010, 2012, 2015, 2022)
	Curaçao U-20				1 (2021)

== Medals by nations (2010–2021) ==
Update after 2022 ABCS Tournament (7th).

Rank	Nation	Gold	Silver	Bronze	Total
1	Suriname (SUR)	3	2	1	6
2	Curaçao (CUR)	2	2	2	6
3	Aruba (ARU)	1	2	3	6
4	Bonaire (BOE)	1	1	1	3
Totals (4 entries)		7	7	7	21

== Tournament history ==
=== ABCS Tournament 2010 ===
Also known as the Pais Positivo Cup 2010.

==== First round ====
29 October 2010

Curaçao	3–0	Aruba
Espacia (1–0); Trenidad (2–0); Steba (3–0)

Ergilio Hato Stadium, Willemstad, Curaçao
Referee: Edsel Dimie (Curaçao)
29 October 2010

Suriname	4–2	Bonaire
Kwasie 13', 63'; Rijssel 39'; Rigters (4–2)		Martha (3–1); I. Piar (3–2) (pen.)

Ergilio Hato Stadium, Willemstad, Curaçao

==== Third place playoff ====
31 October 2010

Aruba	3–3 (abandoned)^{1}	Bonaire
Santos; Escalona (pen.)		I. Piar; A. Piar; Christiaan

Ergilio Hato Stadium, Willemstad, Curaçao
Referee: Roman Bussem (Curaçao)

^{1} Players of Bonaire walked off the pitch after a disagreement over a penalty kick being given against them.

==== Final ====
31 October 2010

Curaçao	2–2	Suriname
Espacia (1–2); Lake (2–2)		? 20' (o.g.); Emanuelson 36' (pen.)
Penalties
	5–6

Ergilio Hato Stadium, Willemstad, Curaçao

=== ABCS Tournament 2011 ===
==== First round ====
2 December 2011
18:00 UTC−3

Curaçao	1–3	Bonaire
Bito 10'	report	Kunst 25'; A. Piar 72'; Calvenhoven 87'

Dr. Ir. F. Essed Stadion, Paramaribo, Suriname
Referee: Enrico Wijngaarde (Suriname)
2 December 2011
20:00 UTC−3

Suriname	0–0	Aruba
	report
Penalties
Limon (penalty scored); Felter (penalty scored); Baneti (penalty scored); Mando (penalty scored); Esperance (penalty missed)	4–5	(penalty scored) Bergen; (penalty scored) Baten; (penalty scored) Santos de Gouveia; (penalty scored) Gomez; (penalty scored) Kock

Dr. Ir. F. Essed Stadion, Paramaribo, Suriname
Referee: Javier Jauregui (Curaçao)

==== Third place playoff ====
4 December 2011
16:00 UTC−3

Suriname	2–0	Curaçao
Banetti 46'; Limon 76'	report

Dr. Ir. F. Essed Stadion, Paramaribo, Suriname

==== Final ====
4 December 2011
18:00 UTC−3

Bonaire	2–2	Aruba
Kunst 34'; Janzen (45+?)	report	Bergen 50'; Gomez 53'
Penalties
Bernardus (penalty scored); Janzen (penalty scored); Calvenhoven (penalty scored); Tomasa (penalty scored)	4–3	(penalty missed) Breinburg; (penalty scored) Bergen; (penalty scored) Santos de Gouveia; (penalty scored) Kock; (penalty missed) Gomez

Dr. Ir. F. Essed Stadion, Paramaribo, Suriname
Referee: Enrico Wijngaarde (Suriname)

=== ABCS Tournament 2012 ===
The 2012 edition of the tournament is to be hosted in Aruba between 13 and 15 July.

==== First round ====
13 July 2012
19:10 UTC−4

Aruba	3–2	Curaçao
Gilkes 2'; Raven 44'; Barradas 76'		Martina 70'; Colina 72'

Complejo Deportivo Guillermo Prospero Trinidad, Oranjestad, Aruba
Referee: Antonius Pinas (Suriname)
13 July 2012
21:15 UTC−4

Suriname	8–0	Bonaire
Limon 28'; Jomena 30'; Wall 37'; Sordam 52'; Aloema 61' (pen.); Jomena 63'; Djemesi 74'; Drenthe 88'

Complejo Deportivo Guillermo Prospero Trinidad, Oranjestad, Aruba
Referee: Rudolph Angela (Aruba)

==== Third place playoff ====
15 July 2012
17:00 UTC−4

Bonaire	2–9	Curaçao

Complejo Deportivo Guillermo Prospero Trinidad, Oranjestad, Aruba
Referee: Antonius Pinas (Suriname)

==== Final ====
15 July 2012
19:00 UTC−4

Aruba	1–0	Suriname
Gilkes 35'

Complejo Deportivo Guillermo Prospero Trinidad, Oranjestad, Aruba
Referee: Javier Jauregui (Curacao)

=== ABCS Tournament 2013 ===
The 2013 edition of the tournament was hosted in Curaçao between 14 and 16 November.

==== First round ====
14 November 2013
20:00 UTC−4

Bonaire	0–2	Suriname
	report	Talea 20'; Apai 61'

Ergilio Hato Stadium, Willemstad, Curaçao
Referee: Javier Jauregui (Curaçao)
14 November 2013
22:00 UTC−4

Curaçao	2–0	Aruba
Isenia 14', 31'

Ergilio Hato Stadium, Willemstad, Curaçao
Referee: Johannes Dolaini (Suriname)

==== Third place playoff ====
16 November 2013
20:00 UTC−4

Bonaire	2–1	Aruba
I. Piar 74'; Barzey 76'	report	Escalona 43'

Ergilio Hato Stadium, Willemstad, Curaçao
Referee: Edsel Dimie (Curaçao)

==== Final ====
16 November 2013
22:00 UTC−4

Curaçao	1–3	Suriname
	Report	Pinas 3'; Najoe 67', 88'

Ergilio Hato Stadium, Willemstad, Curaçao
Referee: Javier Jauregui (Curaçao)

=== ABCS Tournament 2014 ===
It was initially announced that the 2014 edition of the tournament would be hosted by Suriname from 7–9 November. All matches were to be played at André Kamperveen Stadion. Following a strong performance by Curacao during 2014 Caribbean Cup qualification, the tournament was moved to 28–30 November since Curacao would be participating in the finals of the 2014 Caribbean Cup. It was later announced that the tournament had been postponed until 2015 because Curacao had just finished a long Caribbean Cup process.

=== ABCS Tournament 2015 ===
The 2015 edition of the tournament was hosted in Suriname between 30 January and 1 February.

==== First round ====
30 January 2015
19:00 UTC−3

Curaçao	0–0	Aruba
	Report
Penalties
	3–5

Dr. Ir. F. Essed Stadion, Paramaribo, Suriname
Referee: Johannes Dolaini (Suriname)
30 January 2015
21:00 UTC−3

Suriname	3–0	Bonaire
Vallei; Pokie; Cronie	Report

Dr. Ir. F. Essed Stadion, Paramaribo, Suriname
Referee: Juniel Adelina (Curaçao)

==== Third place playoff ====
1 February 2015
16:00 UTC−3

Curaçao	4–1	Bonaire
Winklaar; Winklaar; Martina; Martina	Report	Barzey 85'

Dr. Ir. F. Essed Stadion, Paramaribo, Suriname
Referee: Ricky de Leca (Aruba)

==== Final ====
1 February 2015
18:00 UTC−3

Suriname	1–0	Aruba
Cronie 5'	Report

Dr. Ir. F. Essed Stadion, Paramaribo, Suriname
Referee: Juniel Adelina (Curaçao)

=== 2018 ABCS Cup ===
The 2018 edition of the tournament was scheduled to be played 11–13 May 2018 at the Trinidad Stadium in Oranjestad, Aruba but was cancelled after Curaçao withdrew and qualification for the 2019–20 CONCACAF Nations League was announced.

=== 2021 ABCS Tournament ===
The ABCS tournament 2021 between Aruba, Bonaire, Curaçao and Curaçao U20 took place between 1 and 3 October. Curaçao, whose football association got 100 years old in 2021, hosted.

==== First round ====
1 October 2021

Curaçao	7–1	Aruba
Colina 17', 47'; Sprockel 20'; Na-jir Penny 56'; Pop 59', 65'; Rosa 70'	Report	Hodge (90+?)

FFK Stadium, Willemstad, Curaçao
1 October 2021

Curaçao U20	3–4	Bonaire
Martina 7'; Winklaar 21'; Bibiana 63'	Report	Windster 27'; Seinpaal 3', 77'; Hierck 55'

FFK Stadium, Willemstad, Curaçao

==== Third place playoff ====
2 October 2021

Curaçao U20	2–2	Aruba
Winklaar 50'; Kastaneer 66'	Report	Hodge 33'; Salazar (45+?)
Penalties
	1–4

FFK Stadium, Willemstad, Curaçao

==== Final ====
3 October 2021

Curaçao	1–0	Bonaire
Pop 76'	Report

FFK Stadium, Willemstad, Curaçao

=== 2022 ABCS Tournament ===
The 2022 ABCS Tournament was hosted by Curaçao and was the 7th edition. The tournament was played from 24 to 26 November 2022. This edition featured all four countries of Aruba, Bonaire, Curaçao and Suriname for the first time since 2015.

==== First round ====
24 November 2022
19:00 UTC−4

Suriname	4–1	Bonaire
Apai 1'; Doorson 25'; Amoeferie 32'; Andro 80'	Report	Seinpaal 74'

Stadion Rignaal 'Jean' Francisca, Willemstad
24 November 2022
21:00 UTC−4

Curaçao	2–2	Aruba
Martina 15', 84' (pen.)	Report	Charles 82'; Van der Wijne 90'
Penalties
	5–3

Stadion Rignaal 'Jean' Francisca, Willemstad

==== Third place playoff ====
26 November 2022
19:00 UTC−4

Bonaire	0–1	Aruba
	Report	Gross 17'

Stadion Rignaal 'Jean' Francisca, Willemstad

==== Final ====
26 November 2022
21:00 UTC−4

Suriname	2–2	Curaçao
Wijks 18'; Rigters 72'	Report	Rosa 67'; Martina 90+6' (pen.)
Penalties
	5–6

Stadion Rignaal 'Jean' Francisca, Willemstad
