= 2006 CFU Club Championship =

Tournament details
- Dates: 1 December 2006 – 28 January 2007
- Teams: 15 (from 9 associations)

Final positions
- Champions: (Trinidad and Tobago) W Connection (3rd title)
- Runners-up: (Trinidad and Tobago) San Juan Jabloteh

Tournament statistics
- Matches played: 21
- Goals scored: 79 (3.76 per match)
- Top scorer(s): (Haiti) Dumel Decius (Baltimore) (Trinidad and Tobago) Trent Noel (San Juan Jabloteh) (Trinidad and Tobago) Lester Peltier (San Juan Jabloteh) (Trinidad and Tobago) Andre Toussaint (W Connection); 4 goals

The 2006 CFU Club Championship is the annual international football club competition held in the Caribbean Football Union/CFU region (Caribbean). The Caribbean Tournament Champion will qualify to the 2007 CONCACAF Champions Cup. The CFU changed the home-away format for this tournament to four group stages at Caribbean sites. Fourteen teams competed for the Caribbean berth to the CONCACAF Champions' Cup.

The first round of the 2006 Caribbean Football Union Tournament consisted of two groups of four teams along with two triangulars which took place between November 30 and December 14, 2006.

The first round group winners advanced to the semifinals, with W Connection crowned champions. No clubs from Suriname entered.

== Teams ==
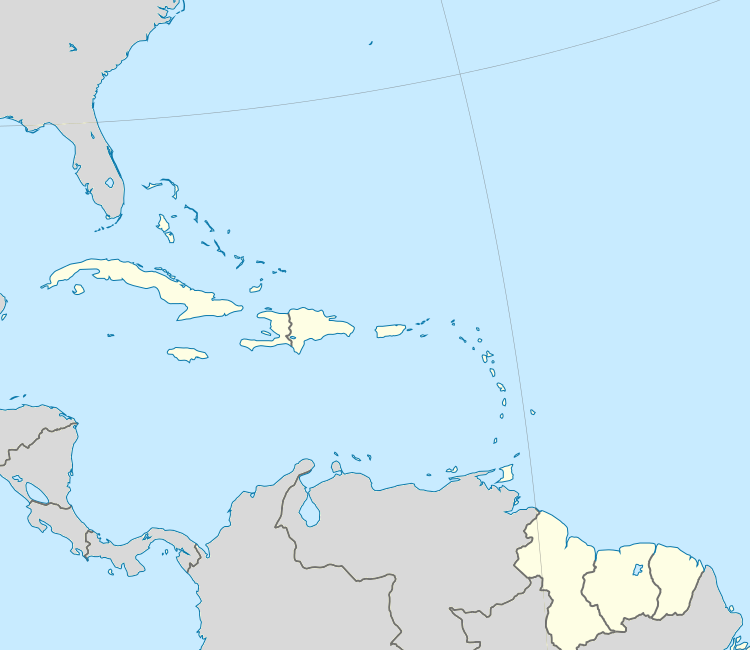
Location of teams of the 2006 CFU Club Championship

Association	Team	Qualification method	App. (last)	Previous best (last)
Netherlands Antilles	Barber	2005–06 Netherlands Antilles Championship winners	3rd (2005)	Semi-finals (2005)
Netherlands Antilles	UNDEBA	2005–06 Netherlands Antilles Championship runners-up	1st	Debut
Aruba	Britannia	Invited	2nd (2005)	First round (2005)
Antigua and Barbuda	SAP	2005–06 Antigua and Barbuda Premier Division winners	1st	Debut
Antigua and Barbuda	Hoppers	2005–06 Antigua and Barbuda Premier Division runners-up	2nd (2005)	Quarter-finals (2005)
Guyana	Fruta Conquerors	Invited (Note: Fruta Conquerors were invited by virtue of being the last Guyanese champion in the GFF National Super League before it suspended operations in 2001.)	2nd (2001)	First round (2001)
Haiti	Baltimore	2005–06 Championnat National Ouverture champions	1st	Debut
Haiti	Aigle Noir	2005–06 Championnat National Clôture champions	1st	Debut
Jamaica	Waterhouse	2005–06 Jamaica Premier League champions	2nd (1998)	Semi-finals (1998)
Jamaica	Harbour View	2005–06 Jamaica Premier League runners-up	4th (2004)	Champions (2004)
Puerto Rico	Puerto Rico Islanders	Invited	1st	Debut
Trinidad and Tobago	W Connection	2005 TT Premier Football League champions	5th (2003)	Champions (2002)
Trinidad and Tobago	San Juan Jabloteh	2005 TT Premier Football League team with best aggregate record in regular season	4th (2004)	Champions (2003)
U.S. Virgin Islands	New Vibes	2005–06 USVISF Premier League champions	1st	Debut
U.S. Virgin Islands	Positive Vibes Victory	2005–06 USVISF Premier League runners-up	2nd (2005)	First round (2005)

== First round ==
Groups A and B took place in Jamaica, while Puerto Rico and US Virgin Islands hosted Groups C and D respectively.

=== Group A ===
Pos	Team	Pld	W	D	L	GF	GA	GD	Pts	Qualification
1	(Jamaica) Harbour View (H)	3	3	0	0	8	0	+8	9	Semi-finals
2	(Netherlands Antilles) Barber	3	2	0	1	4	2	+2	6	
3	(United States Virgin Islands) Positive Vibes Victory	3	1	0	2	3	9	−6	3	
4	(Haiti) Aigle Noir	3	0	0	3	2	6	−4	0	

Source: CONCACAF
(H) Hosts

=== Matches ===
1 December 2006

Barber (Netherlands Antilles)	2–0	(United States Virgin Islands) Positive Vibes Victory
Molina 11'; Cassiani 38'

Harbour View Stadium, Harbour View
Referee: Lee Davis (Trinidad and Tobago)
1 December 2006

Harbour View (Jamaica)	1–0	(Haiti) Aigle Noir
G. Taylor 13'

Harbour View Stadium, Harbour View
Referee: Neal Brizan (Trinidad and Tobago)

3 December 2006

Barber (Netherlands Antilles)	2–0	(Haiti) Aigle Noir
Cassiani 6'; Bernardus 75'

Harbour View Stadium, Harbour View
Referee: Howard Stennet (Jamaica)
3 December 2006

Harbour View (Jamaica)	5–0	(United States Virgin Islands) Positive Vibes Victory
Bryan 5', 56'; F. Taylor 22'; Thomas 67', 80'

Harbour View Stadium, Harbour View
Referee: Richard Piper (Trinidad and Tobago)

5 December 2006

Aigle Noir (Haiti)	2–3	(United States Virgin Islands) Positive Vibes Victory
Weeklenky 85'; Anselme 89'		Baron 20'; Fahie 31'; Francis 64'

Harbour View Stadium, Harbour View
5 December 2006

Harbour View (Jamaica)	2–0	(Netherlands Antilles) Barber
Bryan 11'; Smith 57'

Harbour View Stadium, Harbour View

=== Group B ===
Pos	Team	Pld	W	D	L	GF	GA	GD	Pts	Qualification
1	(Haiti) Baltimore	2	2	0	0	6	0	+6	6	Semi-finals
2	(Jamaica) Waterhouse (H)	2	0	1	1	1	3	−2	1	
3	(Netherlands Antilles) UNDEBA	2	0	1	1	1	5	−4	1	

Source: CONCACAF
(H) Hosts

=== Matches ===
8 December 2006

Waterhouse (Jamaica)	0–2	(Haiti) Baltimore
		Saint-Pierre 18'; Decius 49'

Emmett Park, Kingston
Referee: Richard Piper (Trinidad and Tobago)

10 December 2006

Baltimore (Haiti)	4–0	(Netherlands Antilles) UNDEBA
Decius 6', 26', 45'; Lesca 61'

Emmett Park, Kingston

12 December 2006

Waterhouse (Jamaica)	1–1	(Netherlands Antilles) UNDEBA
D. Williams 64'		Stone 6' (o.g.)

Emmett Park, Kingston

=== Group C ===
Pos	Team	Pld	W	D	L	GF	GA	GD	Pts	Qualification
1	(Trinidad and Tobago) W Connection	2	2	0	0	6	0	+6	6	Semi-finals
2	Puerto Rico Islanders (H)	2	1	0	1	3	2	+1	3	
3	(Antigua and Barbuda) Hoppers	2	0	0	2	1	8	−7	0	
4	(Guyana) Fruta Conquerors	0	0	0	0	0	0	0	0	Withdrew

Source: CONCACAF
(H) Hosts
9 December 2006

Puerto Rico Islanders	3–1	(Antigua and Barbuda) Hoppers
Morales 7', 23'; González 44'		Hernández 5'

Estadio Juan Ramón Loubriel, Bayamón

11 December 2006

W Connection (Trinidad and Tobago)	5–0	(Antigua and Barbuda) Hoppers
Goulart 7', 76'; Toussaint 26'; Viana 54', 55'

Estadio Juan Ramón Loubriel, Bayamón

13 December 2006

Puerto Rico Islanders	0–1	(Trinidad and Tobago) W Connection
		Toussaint 5'

Estadio Juan Ramón Loubriel, Bayamón

=== Group D ===
Pos	Team	Pld	W	D	L	GF	GA	GD	Pts	Qualification
1	(Trinidad and Tobago) San Juan Jabloteh	3	3	0	0	17	0	+17	9	Semi-finals
2	(Antigua and Barbuda) SAP	3	2	0	1	10	6	+4	6	
3	(United States Virgin Islands) New Vibes (H)	3	0	1	2	2	9	−7	1	
4	(Aruba) Britannia	3	0	1	2	2	16	−14	1	

Source: CONCACAF
(H) Hosts
10 December 2006

San Juan Jabloteh (Trinidad and Tobago)	4–0	(Antigua and Barbuda) SAP
Noel 21'; Peltier 54'; Prosper 81'; Wolfe 89'

Lionel Roberts Stadium, Charlotte Amalie
10 December 2006

New Vibes (United States Virgin Islands)	1–1	(Aruba) Britannia
A. Joseph 18'		Lake 50'

Lionel Roberts Stadium, Charlotte Amalie

12 December 2006

Britannia (Aruba)	0–8	(Trinidad and Tobago) San Juan Jabloteh
		Noel 16'; Baptiste 18'; Marcano 21', 51'; W. Joseph 35'; Peltier 45'; Alexis 74'; Guevara 79'

Lionel Roberts Stadium, Charlotte Amalie
12 December 2006

New Vibes (United States Virgin Islands)	1–3	(Antigua and Barbuda) SAP
Wilton 35'		E. Williams 20'; Simon 54'; Challenger 74'

Lionel Roberts Stadium, Charlotte Amalie

14 December 2006

Britannia (Aruba)	1–7	(Antigua and Barbuda) SAP
Gijsbertha 89'		Challenger 8', 31'; Byers 12', 23'; Simon 33'; McKell 44'; Murray 73'

Lionel Roberts Stadium, Charlotte Amalie
14 December 2006

New Vibes (United States Virgin Islands)	0–5	(Trinidad and Tobago) San Juan Jabloteh
		Peltier 2', 26'; Noel 14', 23'; Alexis 90'

Lionel Roberts Stadium, Charlotte Amalie

== Knockout round ==
=== Positions ===
Pos	Team	Pld	W	D	L	GF	GA	GD	Pts
1	(Trinidad and Tobago) San Juan Jabloteh	3	3	0	0	17	0	+17	9
2	(Jamaica) Harbour View	3	3	0	0	8	0	+8	9
3	(Trinidad and Tobago) W Connection	2	2	0	0	6	0	+6	6
4	(Haiti) Baltimore	2	2	0	0	6	0	+6	6

Source: CONCACAF

=== Bracket ===
Semi-finals
1	(Trinidad and Tobago) San Juan Jabloteh	2
4	(Haiti) Baltimore	0
2	(Jamaica) Harbour View	2
3	(Trinidad and Tobago) W Connection	3

Final
1	(Trinidad and Tobago) San Juan Jabloteh	0
3	(Trinidad and Tobago) W Connection	1

=== Semi-finals ===
26 January 2007

W Connection (Trinidad and Tobago)	3–2	(Jamaica) Harbour View
Toussaint 43', 69'; Jean 47' (pen.)		D. Stewart 83'; F. Taylor 89'

Manny Ramjohn Stadium, Marabella
Referee: Roberto Moreno (Panama)
26 January 2007

San Juan Jabloteh (Trinidad and Tobago)	2–0	(Haiti) Baltimore
Prosper 27'; W. Joseph 59'

Manny Ramjohn Stadium, Marabella
Referee: Javier Jauregui (Antigua and Barbuda)

=== Final ===
28 January 2007

San Juan Jabloteh (Trinidad and Tobago)	0–1	(Trinidad and Tobago) W Connection
		Pacheco 11'

Manny Ramjohn Stadium, Marabella
Referee: Javier Jauregui (Antigua and Barbuda)

== Top scorers ==
	Player	Club	Goals
1	(Haiti) Dumel Decius	Baltimore	4
1	(Trinidad and Tobago) Trent Noel	San Juan Jabloteh	4
1	(Trinidad and Tobago) Lester Peltier	San Juan Jabloteh	4
1	(Trinidad and Tobago) Andre Toussaint	W Connection	4
5	(Jamaica) Kavin Bryan	Harbour View	3
5	(Antigua and Barbuda) Okeem Challenger	SAP	3
7	(Curaçao) Edgard Cassiani	Barber	2
7	(Jamaica) Fabian Taylor	Harbour View	2
7	(Jamaica) Rafeik Thomas	Harbour View	2
7	(Puerto Rico) Yuri Morales	Puerto Rico Islanders	2
7	(Brazil) Gefferson Goulart	W Connection	2
7	(Trinidad and Tobago) Rolando Viana	W Connection	2
7	(Trinidad and Tobago) Peter Prosper	San Juan Jabloteh	2
7	(Trinidad and Tobago) Jason Marcano	San Juan Jabloteh	2
7	(Trinidad and Tobago) Wendell Joseph	San Juan Jabloteh	2
7	(Trinidad and Tobago) Michael Alexis	San Juan Jabloteh	2
7	(Antigua and Barbuda) Tyio Simon	SAP	2
7	(Antigua and Barbuda) Peter Byers	SAP	2
