= 2020–21 Aruban Division di Honor =

Aruban Division di Honor/Torneo A.V.B.
- Season: 2020–21
- Dates: 8 May – 24 July 2021
- Champions: Nacional
- Caribbean Club Shield 2022: Nacional

The 2020–21 Aruban Division di Honor (later made the 2021 Torneo A.V.B due to pandemic) was the 60th season of the Division di Honor, the top division football competition in Aruba. Due to the COVID-19 pandemic in Aruba, the season was postponed from its normal November start date and began on 8 May 2021, with a seven-match season. The season ended with the championship game on 24 July 2021. The 2,500-capacity Trinidad Stadium is the league's most used stadium.

== Table ==
=== Regular season ===
Pos	Team	Pld	W	D	L	GF	GA	GD	Pts	Qualification or relegation
1	RCA	7	5	2	0	15	3	+12	17	Advance to playoff
2	Dakota	7	3	3	1	15	10	+5	12	Advance to playoff
3	La Fama	7	3	3	1	11	8	+3	12	Advance to playoff
4	Nacional	7	3	2	2	12	6	+6	11	Advance to playoff
5	Britannia	7	2	2	3	12	11	+1	8	
6	Estrella	7	2	2	3	12	19	−7	8	
7	Caravel	7	1	1	5	8	17	−9	4	
8	Bubali	7	0	3	4	7	18	−11	3	

Source: Rsssf

=== Championship Playoff ===
20 July 2021 Semifinal	RCA	1–2	La Fama	Oranjestad
				Stadium: Guillermo P. Trinidad Stadium

20 July 2021 Semifinal	Dakota	0–1	Nacional	Noord
				Stadium: Compleho Deportivo Frans Figaroa

24 July 2021 Final	La Fama	0–2	Nacional	Oranjestad
				Stadium: Guillermo P. Trinidad Stadium

== Champions ==
Team	Location	Stadium	Capacity
Nacional	Oranjestad	Guillermo P. Trinidad Stadium	5,500
