= Jean-Luc Bergen =

Dutch association football player

Personal information
- Full name: Jean-Luc Bergen
- Date of birth: 8 December 1988 (age 37)
- Place of birth: Oranjestad, Aruba
- Height: 1.75 m (5 ft 9 in)
- Positions: Midfielder; striker

Team information
- Current team: RCA (assistent coach)

Youth career
- RCA

Senior career*
Years	Team	Apps	(Gls)
2006-2008	RCA	28	(5)
2008-2010	VSV TONEGIDO	20	(0)
2011-2014	FC Boshuizen	18	(0)
2014-2023	RCA	118	(23)
Total		184	(28)

International career^{‡}
2005	Aruba U17		
2007	Aruba U20		
2008	Aruba U23		
2011–2018	Aruba	7	(2)

Managerial career
- 2022–2023: Sporting (head coach)
- 2024: Aruba U17 (assistent coach)
- 2025: La Fama (head coach)
- 2026–: RCA (assistent coach)
- * Club domestic league appearances and goals ‡ National team caps and goals as of 30 August 2023

Jean-Luc Bergen (born 8 December 1988), known as Jean-Luc, is an Aruban former footballer who plays as a midfielder or striker for Aruban Division di Honor club RCA and a former member of the Aruba national football team.

In his club career, he played for RCA, VSV TONEGIDO, FC Boshuizen. In 2011, Bergen was selected for the Aruba national team, and debuted against St. Lucia on 12 July 2011, with a 4–2 defeat for the 2014 FIFA World Cup qualification in Brazil. In a 6-6 aggregate, he successfully scored a penalty goal in the penalty shootout, in an eventual defeat to St. Lucia. He also appeared at the 2018 FIFA World Cup qualification in Russia, where on 8 September 2015, he played there against St. Vincent and the Grenadines in a 2–1 victory.

In 2012 he won the 3rd edition of the ABCS tournament with the national team.

== Honours ==
RCA

- Aruban Division di Honor: 2014–15, 2015–16, 2018–19,
- Torneo Copa Betico Croes: 2015-16, 2019-20, 2020-21, 2021-22

Aruba

- ABCS Tournament: 2012
