= Rodney Lake =

Aruban footballer (born 1979)

Personal information
- Full name: Rodney Gregory Lake
- Date of birth: September 16, 1979 (age 47)
- Place of birth: Oranjestad, Aruba, Netherlands Antilles
- Height: 1.78 m (5 ft 10 in)
- Positions: Midfielder; right midfielder

Team information
- Current team: Dakota (assistant coach)

Youth career
- 1987–1995: Dakota

Senior career*
Years	Team	Apps	(Gls)
1995	Dakota	0	(0)
1996–1997	River Plate	25	(3)
1998–2002	RCA	10	(0)
2003–2011	Britannia	110	(20)
2012–2013	Dakota	13	(2)
2013–2014	Britannia	7	(0)
2015–2017	Real Piedra Plat	14	(5)
2017–2018	Dakota	8	(2)
Total		187	(32)

International career
2002–2008	Aruba	4	(0)

Managerial career
- 2021–: Dakota (assistant coach)
- * Club domestic league appearances and goals

Rodney Gregory Lake (born September 16, 1979), known as Gregory, is an Aruban former footballer who played as a midfielder for Aruban Division di Honor club Dakota and a former member of the Aruba national football team and currently who serves as assistant manager of football club Dakota.

== Honours ==
River Plate

- Aruban Division di Honor: 1997

Britannia

- Aruban Division di Honor: 2008–09, 2009–10, 2013–14,
- Finalist: 2012–13
- Torneo Copa Betico Croes: 2007–08, 2008–09, 2009–10, 2010–11
- Finalist: 2015–16

Real Piedra Plat

- Aruban Division Uno: 2016–17

=== Manager ===
Dakota

- Aruban Division di Honor: 2021–22
- Runners-Up: 2022-23, 2023-24, 2024-25
- Torneo Copa Betico Croes: 2025, 2026
- Runners-Up: 2024

== National team statistics ==
Aruba national team
Year	Apps	Goals
2002	1	0
2003	0	0
2004	2	0
2005	0	0
2006	0	0
2007	0	0
2008	1	0
Total	4	0

== Bibliography ==
- Rodney Lake at National-Football-Teams.com
