= Breinburg =

Breinburg is a surname. Notable people with the surname include:

- Gregor Breinburg (born 1991), Aruban footballer
- Petronella Breinburg (1927–2019), Surinamese-British author, playwright, and professor
- Reinhard Breinburg (born 1984), Aruban footballer
