= 2010–11 Aruban Division di Honor =

Aruban football league season

Division di Honor
- Season: 2010–11
- Champions: RCA
- Relegated: Juventud TL; Sporting
- Biggest home win: Britannia 12–1 Sporting (Apr. 12, 2011)
- Biggest away win: Sporting 0–9 Estrella (Oct. 23, 2010)
- Highest scoring: Britannia 12–1 Sporting

In the 2010–11 season, the Aruban Division di Honor — the top-tier football league in Aruba — consisted of ten teams. The championship was won by RCA.

== Teams ==
Location of teams in the 2010–11 Division di Honor

Club	Home city	Home ground
Britannia	Piedra Plat	Franklin J. Bareño Stadium
Bubali	Noord	Noord Field
Nacional	Palm Beach	Deportivo Nacional Field
Estrella	Santa Cruz	Estrella Field
Caravel	Angochi	Caravel Field
Juventud Tl	Tanki Leendert	Juventud Tanki Leendert Field
La Fama	Savaneta	La Fama Field
RCA	Solito	Guillermo P. Trinidad Stadium
River Plate	Madiki	Guillermo P. Trinidad Stadium
Sporting	Ayo	Ayo Field

== Regular stage ==
=== Table ===
Pos	Team	Pld	W	D	L	GF	GA	GD	Pts	Qualification or relegation
1	RCA	18	13	4	1	44	13	+31	43	Playoff Stage
2	Britannia	18	13	2	3	57	19	+38	41	Playoff Stage
3	Nacional	18	10	5	3	31	19	+12	35	Playoff Stage
4	La Fama	18	11	1	6	29	23	+6	34	Playoff Stage
5	Bubali	17	8	6	3	47	22	+25	30	
6	Estrella	18	7	2	9	28	28	0	23	
7	Caravel	18	4	4	10	19	40	−21	16	
8	River Plate	18	3	4	11	15	34	−19	13	Relegation playoffs
9	Juventud TL	18	3	3	12	31	53	−22	12	Relegation playoffs
10	Sporting (R)	17	1	1	15	12	62	−50	4	Relegation to 2011–12 Aruban Division Uno

Source: RSSSF
Rules for classification: 1) points; 2) goal difference; 3) number of goals scored.
(R) Relegated

== Playoff stage ==
Pos	Team	Pld	W	D	L	GF	GA	GD	Pts
1	RCA (C)	6	3	1	2	8	5	+3	10
2	Nacional	6	2	3	1	6	5	+1	9
3	Britannia	6	2	1	3	8	6	+2	7
4	La Fama	6	1	3	2	5	11	−6	6

Updated to match(es) played on 29 July 2011. Source: RSSSF
Rules for classification: 1) points; 2) goal difference; 3) number of goals scored.
(C) Champions

== Final ==
8 June 2010 Grand Final, leg 1/3	RCA	1–0 (1–0 agg.)	Nacional
	R. Gomez

11 June 2010 Grand Final, leg 2/3	Nacional	1–0 (1–1 agg.)	RCA
	R. Lampe

20 June 2010 Grand Final, leg 3/3	RCA	1–0 (2–1 agg.)	Nacional
	E. Santos
