= Kenny Kunst =

Association football player (born 1986)

Personal information
- Full name: Kenneth Jesus Gregorio Kunst
- Date of birth: 1 November 1986 (age 40)
- Place of birth: Willemstad, Curaçao
- Height: 1.75 m (5 ft 9 in)
- Position: Forward

Team information
- Current team: Centro Dominguito

Senior career*
Years	Team	Apps	(Gls)
2004–2006	Victory Boys		
2006–2007	CSD Barber		
2007–2014	Centro Dominguito		
2014–2016	CSD Barber		
2016–	Centro Dominguito		

International career^{‡}
2005	Netherlands Antilles U20	3	(1)
2010	Netherlands Antilles	5	(1)
2011	Bonaire	2	(2)
2011–2015	Curaçao	8	(0)
- * Club domestic league appearances and goals as of 21:11, 16 May 2017 (UTC) ‡ National team caps and goals as of 21:11, 16 May 2017 (UTC)

Kenneth Jesus Gregorio "Kenny" Kunst (born 1 November 1986) is a Curaçaon footballer who plays as a forward for Centro Dominguito.

== International career ==
Kunst originally played for the Netherlands Antilles, playing 3 games for the Under 20 side in the preliminary qualification rounds at the 2005 CONCACAF U-20 Tournament and scoring once. He played 5 games in total for the senior squad, scoring once against Guyana in a 3–2 defeat at the 2010 Caribbean Cup qualification.

When the Netherlands Antilles dissolved in 2010, Kunst chose to represent Curaçao at international level. He made his début on 20 August 2011 in a 1-0 friendly loss against the Dominican Republic.

Kunst has also represented the nation of Bonaire. As Bonaire are not recognised by FIFA, any matches played are unofficial. He played two matches in the 2011 ABCS Tournament, scoring both times. His goals came in a 3–1 victory over Curaçao and in the final; a 2–2 draw with Aruba, which Bonaire went on to win 4–3 on penalties.

== Career statistics ==
=== International ===
As of matches played 11 April 2017.

National team	Year	Apps	Goals
Netherlands Antilles	2010	5	1
Bonaire	2011	2	2
Curaçao	2011	1	0
Curaçao	2012	0	0
Curaçao	2013	0	0
Curaçao	2014	5	0
Curaçao	2015	2	0
Curaçao	2016	0	0
Curaçao	2017	0	0
Total		15	3

=== International goals ===
==== Netherlands Antilles ====
Scores and results list the Netherlands Antilles' goal tally first.

No	Date	Venue	Opponent	Score	Result	Competition
1.	15 October 2010	André Kamperveen Stadion, Paramaribo, Suriname	Guyana	2–3	2–3	2010 Caribbean Cup qualification

==== Bonaire ====
Scores and results list the Bonaire's goal tally first.

No	Date	Venue	Opponent	Score	Result	Competition
1.	2 December 2011	Dr. Ir. Franklin Essed Stadion, Paramaribo, Suriname	Curaçao	1–1	3–1	2011 ABCS Tournament
2.	4 December 2011	Dr. Ir. Franklin Essed Stadion, Paramaribo, Suriname	Aruba	1–0	2–2	2011 ABCS Tournament
