= Emmett Park =

Jamaican stadium

- Emmett Park (Jamaica)
- Interactive map of Emmett Park
- Location: Mid Avenue, Kingston, Jamaica
- Coordinates: 17.978728°N 76.7841071°W
- Capacity: 4,000
- Field size: 372 feet (113 m) x 468 feet (143 m)

Emmett Park is a multi-use stadium in Kingston, Jamaica, adjacent to Sabina Park. It is currently used mostly for football matches. It served as a home ground of Waterhouse F.C. The stadium holds 4,000 people.
