= Maurice Escalona =

Aruban footballer (born 1980)

Personal information
- Full name: Maurice Escalona
- Date of birth: 27 January 1980 (age 46)
- Place of birth: Oranjestad, Aruba
- Height: 1.87 m (6 ft 1 1/2 in)
- Position: Forward

Team information
- Current team: Sporting (head coach)

Youth career
- 1990–1997: Bubali

Senior career*
Years	Team	Apps	(Gls)
1996	Bubali	0	(0)
1997	RCA	0	(0)
1998	River Plate	6	(2)
2004–2006	Scheveningen	14	(10)
2006–2009	RCA	38	(18)
2009–2010	Bubali	16	(5)
2010–2011	Britannia	8	(2)
2011–2013	RCA	18	(6)
2014–2015	Bubali	8	(4)
2016–2017	RCA	3	(0)
2018–2019	Bubali	7	(5)
Total		118	(52)

International career
2004–2006	Aruba U20	4	(0)
2006–2008	Aruba U21	5	(0)
2004-2015	Aruba	11	(4)

Managerial career
- 2018–2019: RCA (youth coach)
- 2021–2022: RCA (head coach)
- 2022–2023: Unistars (head coach)
- 2025–2026: Sporting (head coach)
- * Club domestic league appearances and goals

Maurice Escalona (born 27 January 1980), commonly known as Maurice, is an Aruban former footballer and current manager. He played primarily as a forward, left winger, most notably for RCA in the Aruban Division di Honor. Escalona was also a former member of the Aruba national football team.

== Honours ==
RCA

- Aruban Division di Honor: 2007-08, 2011-12
- Torneo Copa Betico Croes: 2011–12, 2021–22

Britannia

- Aruban Division di Honor: 2008–09
- Torneo Copa Betico Croes: 2008–09, 2010–11

=== Manager ===
Sporting

- Aruban Division di Honor:
- Runners-Up: 2025–26

== Career statistics ==
Aruba national team
Year	Apps	Goals
2004	2	2
2005	3	1
2006	2	0
2007	0	0
2008	2	0
2009	0	0
2010	1	0
2011	1	1
Total	11	4

#	Date	Venue	Opponent	Score	Result	Competition
1.	28 February 2004	Trinidad Stadium, Oranjestad, Aruba	Suriname	1–2	Lost	2006 FIFA World Cup qualification
2.	27 March 2004	André Kamperveen Stadion, Paramaribo, Suriname	Suriname	8–1	Lost	2006 FIFA World Cup qualification
3.	31 October 2010	Ergilio Hato Stadium, Willemstad, Curaçao	Bonaire	3–3	Draw	2010 ABCS Tournament
4.	8 July 2011	Trinidad Stadium, Oranjestad, Aruba	Saint Lucia	4–2	Won	2014 FIFA World Cup qualification
5.	16 November 2013	Ergilio Hato Stadium, Willemstad, Curaçao	Bonaire	2–1	Lost	2013 ABCS Tournament
Correct as of 16 February 2013
