= Ilfred Piar =

Bonairean footballer (born 1989)

Personal information
- Date of birth: August 19, 1989 (age 37)
- Place of birth: Bonaire
- Position: Forward

Team information
- Current team: Real Rincon

Senior career*
Years	Team	Apps	(Gls)
2006–	Real Rincon		

International career^{‡}
2013–	Bonaire	8	(2)
- * Club domestic league appearances and goals as of November 21, 2013 ‡ National team caps and goals as of 01:17, 17 November 2019 (UTC)

Ilfred “Tètè” Piar is an international footballer who currently plays for Real Rincon of the Bonaire League and the Bonaire national football team.

== Club career ==
Piar currently plays for Real Rincon of the Bonaire League. For the 2014 season, he was the league's top goalscorer with 32 goals in 16 matches.

In April 2018 Real Rincon became the first club from Bonaire to compete in CONCACAF international competition as they qualified for the 2018 CONCACAF Caribbean Club Shield. In Real Rincon's opening match, Piar scored a goal as the club defeated Hard Rock FC of Grenada 3–1 in Santiago de los Caballeros, Dominican Republic.

== International career ==
On 14 November 2013, Piar made his international debut for Bonaire against Suriname in the 2013 ABCS Tournament. This match was also Bonaire's official debut after being accepted as an associate member of CONCACAF and member of the CFU in April 2013. After losing to Suriname in the semi-finals, Bonaire defeated Aruba in the 3rd place match 2–1. Piar opened the scoring against the FIFA side and scored the first official goal for Bonaire after becoming a CFU member.

=== International goals ===
Scores and results list Bonaire's goal tally first.

No.	Date	Venue	Opponent	Score	Result	Competition
1.	16 November 2013	Ergilio Hato Stadium, Willemstad, Curaçao	Aruba	1–1	2–1	2013 ABCS Tournament
2.	17 November 2019	Ergilio Hato Stadium, Willemstad, Curaçao	Bahamas	1–1	1–1	2019–20 CONCACAF Nations League C
