= Suehendley Barzey =

Bonairean footballer

Personal information
- Full name: Suehendley Barzey
- Date of birth: 24 July 1989 (age 37)
- Place of birth: Bonaire
- Position: Striker

Team information
- Current team: HVV Hercules

Senior career*
Years	Team	Apps	(Gls)
2007–2015	SV Juventus Antriòl		
2015–2016	TAC '90		
2019-	HVV Hercules		

International career
2013–2015	Bonaire	7	(3)
- * Club domestic league appearances and goals as of 20:24, 14 December 2016 (UTC)

Suehendley Barzey (born 24 July 1989) is a Bonairean footballer who plays for the Bonaire national team. With three international goals, Barzey is Bonaire's joint all-time top goal scorer since joining CONCACAF in 2013, along with Yurick Seinpaal and Jermaine Windster.

== Club career ==
From 2007 to 2015, Barzey played for SV Juventus in the Bonaire League. In 2015, he began playing for TAC '90 of the Eerste Klasse, the sixth tier of football in the Netherlands. He was one of the league's top scorers in his first season with the club with 8 goals. In November 2016, he was suspended by the KNVB for 36 months and dismissed from the club immediately after being involved in a physical altercation with an assistant referee during a match against Alphense Boys.

In summer 2019, Papa Barzey joined amateur side Hercules.

== International career ==
On 14 November 2013, Barzey made his international debut for Bonaire against Suriname in the 2013 ABCS Tournament. This match was also Bonaire's official debut after being accepted as a member of CONCACAF and the CFU in April 2013. Two days later, Barzey scored his first international goal, the game-winner, as Bonaire defeated Aruba in the third place match. In May 2014, Barzey was named to Bonaire's roster for 2014 Caribbean Cup qualification, the first CONCACAF tournament in which they took part after becoming a member. During qualification, Barzey scored his first competitive goal for Bonaire on 5 September 2015 in a second round victory over Suriname.

== Career statistics ==
=== International ===
Appearances and goals by national team and year
National team	Year	Apps	Goals
Bonaire	2013	2	1
Bonaire	2014	3	1
Bonaire	2015	2	1
Total		7	3

Scores and results list Bonaire's goal tally first, score column indicates score after each Barzey goal.

List of international goals scored by Suehendley Barzey
No.	Date	Venue	Opponent	Score	Result	Competition
1	16 November 2013	Ergilio Hato Stadium, Willemstad, Curaçao	Aruba	1–2	1–2	2013 ABCS Tournament
2	5 September 2014	Stade En Camée, Rivière-Pilote, Martinique	Suriname	3–0	3–2	2014 Caribbean Cup qualification
3	1 February 2015	Dr. Ir. Franklin Essed Stadion, Paramaribo, Suriname	Curaçao	1–4	1–4	2015 ABCS Tournament
