= Ashar Bernardus =

Curaçao footballer

Personal information
- Full name: Ashlar Christopher Bernardus
- Date of birth: 21 December 1985 (age 40)
- Place of birth: Willemstad, Curacao
- Height: 1.75 m (5 ft 9 in)
- Position: Midfielder

Team information
- Current team: Centro Dominguito
- Number: 10

Youth career
- Victory Boys

Senior career*
Years	Team	Apps	(Gls)
2003–2006	Victory Boys		
2006–2012	Centro Barber		
2012	Centro Dominguito		

International career
2006–2008	Netherlands Antilles	5	(1)
2011–2017	Curacao	15	(0)
2011	Bonaire	2	(0)
- * Club domestic league appearances and goals

Ashar Bernardus (born 21 December 1985) is a Curaçaoan football midfielder who currently plays for Centro Dominguito in the Curacao League.

== International career ==
He made his national debut with the Netherlands Antilles Nation Football Team on September 8, 2006, against Guyana, with the result of the match 0–5 in Guyana's favor. Bernardus made his first goal with the Netherlands Antilles national team on October 23, 2008, against the Cuba national team in a 7-1 match that resulted in Cuba's victory. On August 19, 2011, Bernardus made his debut with the Curaçao national football team in a friendly match against the Dominican Republic that Curaçao lost 1–0.

== Career statistics ==
=== International ===
Scores and results list the Netherlands Antilles's goal tally first, score column indicates score after each Bernardus goal.

List of international goals scored by Ashar Bernardus
No.	Date	Venue	Opponent	Score	Result	Competition
1	23 October 2008	Estadio Pedro Marrero, Havana, Cuba	Cuba	1–4	1–7	2008 Caribbean Cup qualification
