= Dimitrie Apai =

Surinamese footballer (born 1994)

Personal information
- Full name: Dimitrie Apai
- Date of birth: 19 July 1994 (age 32)
- Place of birth: Paramaribo, Suriname
- Height: 1.74 m (5 ft 9 in)
- Position: Forward

Team information
- Current team: Transvaal
- Number: 14

Senior career*
Years	Team	Apps	(Gls)
2012–2014	Transvaal		
2014–2021	W Connection	50	(31)
2021–2026	Transvaal		

International career^{‡}
2013–	Suriname	30	(5)
- * Club domestic league appearances and goals ‡ National team caps and goals as of 05:45, 26 November 2022 (UTC)

Dimitrie Apai (born 19 July 1994) is a Surinamese footballer who plays as a forward for S.V. Transvaal and the Suriname national football team.

== Club career ==
=== Transvaal ===
Apai began his career with S.V. Transvaal of Suriname's semi-professional Hoofdklasse. In late 2013, Apai was invited for a trial with W Connection F.C. of Trinidad and Tobago's TT Pro League after an impressive showing during 2013 CONCACAF U-20 Championship qualifying in which Apai scored three goals in three matches during the group stage including two against Trinidad and Tobago. Following a trial which saw him score four goals in two matches, it was announced on 30 January 2014 that W Connection purchased the player from Transvaal. By signing a contract with W Connection, Apai became only the second fully professional player representing Suriname at that time, along with Stefano Rijssel who also played for the Trinidadian club for two years.

=== W Connection ===
Apai made his professional debut on 24 January 2014 against North East Stars. He scored his first goal for the club coming on as a substitute and scoring the stoppage time equalizer against Central FC on 11 February 2014. Apai has played in 3 CCL matches of the 2016 season against Deportivo Saprissa and two against Santos Laguna. On 19 January 2016, Apai scored the fourth and fifth goal for Connection in a 7–1 win. His first international goal for W Connection was in the 2016 CFU Club Championship where he scored in the 67th minute against CS Moulien. On 11 March 2016, he scored the only goal in a 1–0 win against Point Fortin Civic. He scored two more goals for Connection in a 3–0 win vs St. Ann's Rangers on 17 May 2016 in the seasons last match. On July, Apai said in a local Surinamese interview that he will not return to Suriname at his young age, stating he wants to become a professional player whether it is in Europe or elsewhere. He was a starter in the first match against UNAM in the 2017 CCL and assisted Jamal Charles into scoring the second goal of the match for Connection. He was a starter once again in the first match against Honduras Progreso and also giving an assist. On 25 October, he scored his first goal of the new season against Point Fortin Civic that ended 7–0 for WCO. On 14 January 2017, Apai scored two goals and gave one assist in the match against Defence Force, three days later, he scored the only goal in a 1–0 win against St. Ann's Rangers for W Connection. Apai was named player of the month December for the season of 2016–2017, In which he scored four goals in four matches. In December 2017, Apai was named Footballer of the Year in Suriname by VSJS.

=== Europe ===
After leaving W Connection in summer 2019, Apai went on trial with Beerschot of the Belgian First Division B. While in Europe he took part in a training camp with the national team in preparation for upcoming 2019–20 CONCACAF Nations League B matches. He appeared in a match against Telstar and, after scoring Suriname's game-winning goal in its final friendly against RKSV Leonidas, he was invited to trial with Mosta of the Maltese Premier League.

=== Return to Transvaal ===
After six years with W Connection, Apai returned to Suriname signing for Transvaal.

== International career ==
Apai has represented Suriname at the U17, U20, and U23 levels. Apai made his senior international debut in the 2013 ABCS Tournament against Bonaire. He scored his first international goal in the match, the second goal of a 2–0 victory.

In June 2021, Apai was named to the Suriname squad for the 2021 CONCACAF Gold Cup.

=== International goals ===
Scores and results list Surinames's goal tally first.

#	Date	Venue	Opponent	Score	Result	Competition
1.	14 November 2013	Ergilio Hato Stadium, Willemstad, Curaçao	Bonaire	2–0	2–0	2013 ABCS Tournament
2.	6 January 2017	Ato Boldon Stadium, Couva, Trinidad and Tobago	Haiti	1–4	2–4	2017 Caribbean Cup qualification
3.	15 November 2019	André Kamperveen Stadion, Paramaribo, Suriname	Dominica	1–0	4–0	2019–20 CONCACAF Nations League B
4.	15 November 2019	André Kamperveen Stadion, Paramaribo, Suriname	Dominica	4–0	4–0	2019–20 CONCACAF Nations League B
Last updated 15 November 2019

== Honours ==
W Connection

- TT Pro League: 2018
- FA Trophy: 2017
- First Citizens Cup 2015, 2017
- Charity Shield: 2018

Individual

- First Citizens Cup MVP: 2017
- First Citizens Cup Topscorer: 2017
- First Citizens Cup Best Forward: 2017
- Surinamese Footballer of the Year (2): 2016, 2017
