= Galgyto Talea =

Surinamese footballer

Personal information
- Full name: Galgyto Lafael Talea
- Date of birth: February 4, 1988 (age 38)
- Place of birth: Paramaribo, Suriname
- Position: Forward

Team information
- Current team: Inter Moengotapoe
- Number: 10

Senior career*
Years	Team	Apps	(Gls)
2008–2009	Jai Hanuman	?	(?)
2009–2012	Robinhood	?	(?)
2012–2016	Notch	?	(18)
2016–	Inter Moengotapoe		(0)

International career^{‡}
- Suriname U20
2010–	Suriname	22	(3)
- * Club domestic league appearances and goals as of October 9, 2016 ‡ National team caps and goals as of February 22, 2017

Galgyto Lafael Talea (born February 4, 1988) is a Surinamese footballer playing as a forward for Inter Moengotapoe in the Hoofdklasse and for the Suriname national team.

== Career ==
Talea began his career in the 2008–09 SVB Eerste Klasse, playing for SV Jai Hanuman in the second division of football in Suriname. Helping his team to promotion to the SVB Hoofdklasse, after winning the league title in his first season with the club. Talea then transferred to SV Robinhood the following season despite his team's promotion. In 2012, he transferred to SV Notch where he would finish as the league's top goal scorer with 18 goals scored in his first season with the club. In 2016, he moved to IMT.

== International career ==
Talea plays for the Suriname national team having made his debut on 31 October 2010 against the Netherlands Antilles for the 2010 Caribbean Cup qualification. He scored his first goal on 15 November 2013 in the ABCS Tournament in a 2–0 win over Bonaire. On 8 October 2016 he scored his first official goal for Suriname in the match against Guyana in the third round of the Caribbean cup qualification 2016, A match that ended 3-2 for Natio.

== Career statistics ==
=== International goals ===
Scores and results list Suriname' goal tally first.

Goal	Date	Venue	Opponent	Score	Result	Competition
1.	15 November 2013	Ergilio Hato Stadium, Willemstad, Curaçao	Bonaire	1–0	2–0	2013 ABCS Tournament
2.	24 August 2014	Stade René Long, Saint-Laurent-du-Maroni, French Guiana	French Guiana	1–0	1–0	Friendly match
3.	8 October 2016	André Kamperveen Stadion, Paramaribo, Suriname	Guyana	2–1	3–2	2017 Caribbean Cup qualification

== Honors ==
=== Club ===
Jai Hanuman

- SVB Eerste Klasse (1): 2008–09

=== Individual ===
- SVB Hoofdklasse Top Goalscorer: 2012–13
