= 2014–15 Aruban Division di Honor =

Aruban Division di Honor
- Season: 2014–15
- Matches: 45
- Goals: 180 (4 per match)
- Biggest home win: Dakota 7-0 San Nicolas; RCA 7-0 San Nicolas
- Biggest away win: Brazil Juniors 1-5 RCA; River Plate 1-5 Estrella; San Nicolas 1-5 Estrella
- Highest scoring: Brazil Juniors 3-5 La Fama
- Longest winning run: Britannia (6)
- Longest unbeaten run: Britannia (6)
- Longest winless run: Brazil Juniors (9)
- Longest losing run: River Plate (5)

The 2014–15 Aruban Division di Honor season is the 54th season of top-tier football in Aruba. It began on 10 October 2014. Britannia are the reigning champions, coming off their fourth league title in 10 years.

== Teams ==
Caiquetio and Caravel were each relegated to Aruban Division Uno after finishing in ninth and 10th place, respectively, in last season's competition. Brazil Juniors and San Nicolas were each promoted from Division Uno.

Team	Home city	Home ground
Brazil Juniors	Brasil	Brazil Juniors Stadium
Britannia	Piedra Plat	Compleho Deportivo Franklyn Bareño
Bubali	Noord	Bubali Stadium
Dakota	Oranjestad	Guillermo P. Trinidad Stadium
Estrella	Santa Cruz	Guillermo P. Trinidad Stadium
La Fama	Savaneta	La Fama Stadium
Nacional	Palm Beach/Noord	Compleho Deportivo Frans Figaroa
RCA	Oranjestad	Guillermo P. Trinidad Stadium
River Plate	Oranjestad	Guillermo P. Trinidad Stadium
San Nicolas	San Nicolaas	Joe Laveist Sport Park

== Regular season ==
Pos	Team	Pld	W	D	L	GF	GA	GD	Pts	Qualification
1	RCA	18	13	4	1	65	15	+50	43	Qualification for 2015 Aruban Division di Honor Playoffs
2	Britannia	18	14	0	4	57	25	+32	42	Qualification for 2015 Aruban Division di Honor Playoffs
3	Bubali	18	10	5	3	41	20	+21	35	Qualification for 2015 Aruban Division di Honor Playoffs
4	Estrella	18	9	4	5	35	27	+8	31	Qualification for 2015 Aruban Division di Honor Playoffs
5	Dakota	18	8	5	5	47	20	+27	29	
6	La Fama	18	8	4	6	41	32	+9	28	
7	Nacional	18	7	2	9	34	34	0	23	
8	River Plate	18	4	2	12	23	46	−23	14	
9	San Nicolas	18	3	0	15	12	67	−55	9	
10	Brazil Juniors	18	0	2	16	18	87	−69	2	

Updated to match(es) played on 5 July 2015. Source:
Rules for classification: 1) points; 2) goal difference; 3) number of goals scored.

Home \ Away	BRA	BRI	BUB	DAK	EST	LAF	NAC	RCA	RIV	SAN
Brazil Juniors		2–9	2–4	0–10	2–5	3–5	1–2	1–5	1–1	1–2
Britannia	6–0		1–4	1–0	2–3	2–1	1–2	2–1	4–2	7–1
Bubali	5–0	0–2		1–1	1–0	2–2	2–1	0–0	3–0	6–0
Dakota	4–0	1–2	3–1		1–2	4–1	2–2	2–2	3–0	7–0
Estrella	2–2	0–3	0–0	1–1		1–3	3–1	0–1	3–2	2–1
La Fama	6–1	0–4	3–3	0–1	0–2		2–1	0–0	3–2	7–0
Nacional	5–0	0–4	1–2	5–2	1–1	1–2		1–4	0–1	4–0
RCA	12–1	6–1	3–0	1–0	4–0	2–2	5–2		3–2	7–0
River Plate	1–0	1–2	1–4	1–1	1–5	1–3	2–3	1–7		3–1
San Nicolas	3–1	1–4	0–3	0–4	1–5	2–1	0–2	0–2	0–1	

Updated to match(es) played on 6 December 2014. Source: soccerway.com
Legend: Blue = home team win; Yellow = draw; Red = away team win.

== Play-offs ==
Pos	Team	Pld	W	D	L	GF	GA	GD	Pts	Qualification
1	Estrella	6	3	3	0	6	3	+3	12	Qualification for 2015 Aruban Division di Honor Final
2	RCA	6	3	2	1	9	4	+5	11	Qualification for 2015 Aruban Division di Honor Final
3	Britannia	6	3	1	2	8	6	+2	10	
4	Bubali	6	0	0	6	3	13	−10	0	

Updated to match(es) played on 5 July 2015. Source:
Rules for classification: 1) points; 2) goal difference; 3) number of goals scored.

== Final ==
7 July 2015

Estella	2–2	RCA

10 July 2015

RCA	3–0	Estrella

RCA wins the series.

13 July 2015

Estrella	v	RCA
	Not necessary
