= Jurensley Martina =

Curaçaoan footballer (born 1993)

Personal information
- Full name: Jurensley Lorencio Martina
- Date of birth: 10 August 1993 (age 33)
- Place of birth: Willemstad, Netherlands Antilles
- Height: 1.79 m (5 ft 10 in)
- Position: Forward

Team information
- Current team: Inter Willemstad

Senior career*
| Years | Team | Apps | (Gls) |
| 2012 | Victory Boys | | |
| 2013–2016 | Barber | | |
| 2017 | Victory Boys | | |
| 2017–2018 | Jong Holland | | (14) |
| 2018–2019 | Barber | | (12) |
| 2019–2022 | Jong Holland | | (39) |
| 2022 | Inter Hilhemstad | | (25) |

International career
| 2012 | Curaçao U20 | 6 | (2) |
| 2012– | Curaçao | 8 | (6) |
- * Club domestic league appearances and goals

Jurensley Lorencio Martina (born 10 August 1993) is a Curaçaoan footballer who plays forward for inter Willemstad and the Curaçao national team.

== Club career ==
Born in Willemstad, Netherlands Antilles, Martina began his career with SV Victory Boys in the Sekshon Pagá, the highest level of football in Curaçao. He parted with the club after his first season, signing with CSD Barber, whom he helped to their sixth national championship in 2014.

== International career ==
Martina plays for the national team of Curaçao. He made his debut for the first team in the ABCS Tournament on 13 July 2012, scoring on his debut, in a 3–2 loss against Aruba. He then played for Curaçao U-20 in qualifying for the CONCACAF Under-20 Championship, scoring against Dominica U-20 twice. He also played in the 2012 Caribbean Cup qualification for the first team against Saint Lucia, Guyana and Saint Vincent and the Grenadines that same year. On 1 February 2015, Martina scored twice in the ABCS Tournament in a 4–0 against Bonaire.

== Career statistics ==
=== International ===
As of match played 26 November 2022

Appearances and goals by national team and year
| National team | Year | Apps | Goals |
|---|---|---|---|
| Curaçao | 2012 | 4 | 1 |
| Curaçao | 2013 | 0 | 0 |
| Curaçao | 2014 | 0 | 0 |
| Curaçao | 2015 | 2 | 2 |
| Curaçao | 2016 | 0 | 0 |
| Curaçao | 2017 | 0 | 0 |
| Curaçao | 2018 | 0 | 0 |
| Curaçao | 2019 | 0 | 0 |
| Curaçao | 2020 | 0 | 0 |
| Curaçao | 2021 | 0 | 0 |
| Curaçao | 2022 | 2 | 3 |
| Total | | 8 | 6 |

Scores and results list Curacao's goal tally first, score column indicates score after each Martina goal.

List of international goals scored by Jurensley Martina
| No. | Date | Venue | Cap | Opponent | Score | Result | Competition |
|---|---|---|---|---|---|---|---|
| 1 | 13 July 2012 | Trinidad Stadium, Oranjestad, Aruba | 1 | Aruba | 2–1 | 2–3 | 2012 ABCS Tournament |
| 2 | 1 February 2015 | Dr. Ir. Franklin Essed Stadion, Paramaribo, Suriname | 6 | Bonaire | 2–0 | 4–0 | 2015 ABCS Tournament |
| 3 | 1 February 2015 | Dr. Ir. Franklin Essed Stadion, Paramaribo, Suriname | 6 | Bonaire | 4–0 | 4–0 | 2015 ABCS Tournament |
| 4 | 24 November 2022 | Stadion Rignaal 'Jean' Francisca, Brievengat, Curaçao | 7 | Aruba | 1–0 | 2–2 | 2022 ABCS Tournament |
| 5 | 24 November 2022 | Stadion Rignaal 'Jean' Francisca, Brievengat, Curaçao | 7 | Aruba | 2–1 | 2–2 | 2022 ABCS Tournament |
| 6 | 26 November 2022 | Stadion Rignaal Jean Francisca, Brievengat, Curaçao | 8 | Suriname | 2–2 | 2–2 | 2022 ABCS Tournament |

== Honours ==
Barber

- Sekshon Pagá: 2014
