= 2015–16 Aruban Division di Honor =

Aruban Division di Honor
- Season: 2015–16

The 2015–16 Aruban Division di Honor season is the 55th season of top-tier football in Aruba.

== Teams ==
Brazil Juniors who finished in 10th place last season were relegated to the Aruban First Division Division Uno. Caravell were promoted from the First Division Division di Honor.

Team	Home city	Home ground
Britannia	Piedra Plat	Compleho Deportivo Franklyn Bareño
Bubali	Noord	Bubali Stadium
Dakota	Oranjestad	Guillermo P. Trinidad Stadium
Nacional	Palm Beach/Noord	Compleho Deportivo Frans Figaroa
Estrella	Santa Cruz	Guillermo P. Trinidad Stadium
La Fama	Savaneta	La Fama Stadium
Caravel	Santa Cruz/Angochi	Guillermo P. Trinidad Stadium
RCA	Oranjestad	Guillermo P. Trinidad Stadium
River Plate	Oranjestad	Guillermo P. Trinidad Stadium
San Nicolas	San Nicolaas	Joe Laveist Sport Park

== Regular season ==
Pos	Team	Pld	W	D	L	GF	GA	GD	Pts	Qualification or relegation
1	RCA	18	17	0	1	71	13	+58	51	Qualification to the Caya 4
2	Britannia	18	14	2	2	50	16	+34	44	Qualification to the Caya 4
3	Dakota	18	12	3	3	51	18	+33	39	Qualification to the Caya 4
4	Nacional	18	8	3	7	35	28	+7	27	Qualification to the Caya 4
5	Bubali	18	8	2	8	34	31	+3	25 (Note: Deducted 1 point.)	
6	River Plate	18	8	1	9	30	32	−2	25	
7	Estrella	18	6	2	10	24	33	−9	20	
8	La Fama	18	4	1	13	13	32	−19	13	
9	Caravel	18	3	1	14	17	52	−35	10	
10	San Nicolas	18	1	3	14	13	83	−70	6	Relegation to Aruban First Division

Updated to match(es) played on 4 May 2016.
Source: https://www.rsssf.org/tablesa/aruba2016.html

== Caya 4 ==
Pos	Team	Pld	W	D	L	GF	GA	GD	Pts	Qualification or relegation
1	Dakota	6	4	1	1	12	7	+5	13	Qualification to the Final
2	RCA	6	3	2	1	12	6	+6	11	Qualification to the Final
3	Britannia	6	3	0	3	10	8	+2	9	
4	Nacional	6	0	1	5	5	18	−13	1	

Updated to match(es) played on 4 May 2016.
Source: https://www.rsssf.org/tablesa/aruba2016.html

== Final ==
First Leg [Jun 15]

Dakota 0-1 RCA

Second Leg [Jun 19]

RCA 1-0 Dakota

Third Leg [Jun 23; if necessary]

Dakota n/p RCA
