= Ronny Aloema =

Surinamese footballer

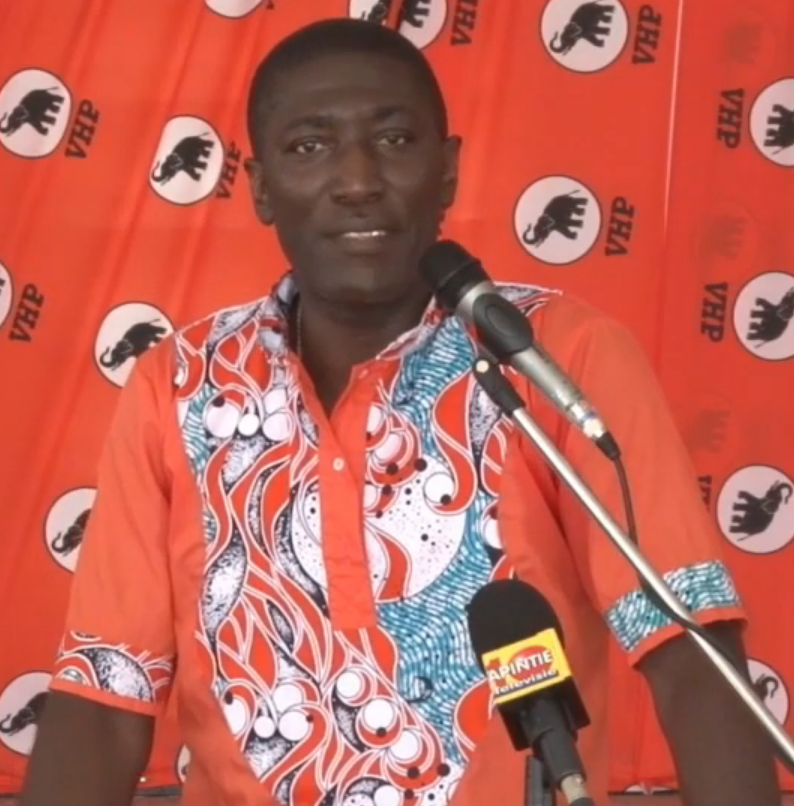
- Aloema in 2020

Member of the National Assembly
- Incumbent
- Assumed office 7 August 2020
- Constituency: Paramaribo District

Personal details
- Born: Ronny Clyde Aloema; 18 October 1979 (age 47) Suriname
- Party: VHP
Association football career
- Position: Goalkeeper
Senior career*
| Years | Team | Apps | (Gls) |
| 2002–2006 | SV Voorwaarts | | |
| 2007–2009 | SV Transvaal | | |
| 2009 | Tobago United | | |
| 2009–2011 | SV Transvaal | | |
| 2011–2014 | SV Robinhood | | |
| 2014–2017 | Walking Bout Company | | |
International career
| 2008–2014 | Suriname | 24 | (3) |
- * Club domestic league appearances and goals

Ronny Clyde Aloema (born 18 October 1979) is a Surinamese politician and former football goalkeeper. He has served as a member of the National Assembly since 7 August 2020, representing Paramaribo District for the Progressive Reform Party (VHP).

As a footballer, Aloema played at the club level in Suriname and Trinidad and Tobago, and for Suriname at the international level.

== Football ==
=== Domestic career ===
Aloema played for SV Voorwaarts between 2002 and 2006, before signing for SV Transvaal in 2007. He signed for Trinidadian TT Pro League club Tobago United in 2009, but returned to SV Transvaal the following year. In 2011, he moved to S.V. Robinhood.

=== International career ===
Aloema made his debut for Suriname in 2008. His last appearance to date was a 2012 Caribbean Cup qualifying match against St Vincent & the Grenadines. In addition to his 24 FIFA-recognised caps, Aloema played in three unofficial matches. Despite being a goalkeeper, he took penalty kicks for the national team, scoring twice in official matches and twice in unofficial matches.

Aloema has also played for the Suriname national futsal team.

=== International goals ===
| No. | Date | Venue | Opponent | Score | Result | Competition |
|---|---|---|---|---|---|---|
| 1 | 13 October 2010 | André Kamperveen Stadion, Paramaribo, Suriname | Netherlands Antilles | 2–1 | 2–1 | 2010 Caribbean Cup qualification |
| 2 | 13 July 2012 | Guillermo Prospero Trinidad Stadium, Oranjestad, Aruba | Bonaire | ? | 8–0 | Friendly |
| 3 | 9 September 2012 | Stade Pierre-Aliker, Fort-de-France, Martinique | Martinique | 1–2 | 2–2 | 2012 Caribbean Cup qualification |
| 4 | 18 November 2012 | Dwight Yorke Stadium, Bacolet, Trinidad and Tobago | Saint Vincent and the Grenadines | 1–0 | 1–0 | 2012 Caribbean Cup qualification |

Note
Bonaire and Martinique aren't affiliated to FIFA, but they are CONCACAF members.

== Politics ==
Aloema has been active with the Progressive Reform Party (VHP) since 2017. In the 2020 general election, he was part of the VHP candidate list for Paramaribo District. He was sworn in as a member of the National Assembly on 7 August 2020, one of three replacements for VHP ministers in the new government. He spoke beforehand of his intentions to promote sports and entrepreneurship.
