= Giovanni Drenthe =

Surinamese footballer

Personal information
- Date of birth: February 16, 1990 (age 36)
- Place of birth: Paramaribo, Suriname
- Position: Striker

Team information
- Current team: SV Voorwaarts

Senior career*
Years	Team	Apps	(Gls)
2007–2010	SV Voorwaarts	41	(3)
2010–2015	SV Excelsior	122	(5)
2015–?	Walking Boyz Company	28	(9)

International career^{‡}
- Suriname U17
- Suriname U20
2009–2012	Suriname	15	(5)
- * Club domestic league appearances and goals ‡ National team caps and goals as of 1 April 2013

Giovanni Drenthe (born February 16, 1990) is a Surinamese footballer who currently plays as a striker. Drenthe also played for Suriname youth teams. The attacker is the younger brother of football player Royston Drenthe.

== Club career ==
=== SV Voorwaarts ===
In the SV Voorwaarts Drenthe mainly plays for the team promise. In the youth competition and Surinamese youth teams talent makes a big impression. The game at the youth teams may participate Drenthe several times with the main force. On January 6, 2008 Drenthe makes his appearance by scoring 8 goals in one match at the highest level in the derby against SV Robinhood (3-4 loss).

In September 2007, Drenthe and his compatriots Kromorejo Ruiz and Fabian van Dijk moved to the Netherlands to a three-week internship with the youth of SC Heerenveen. Drenthe played in exhibition games for Heerenveen in spite of level A1 and knew a good impression during his internship. In October, the players flew back to Suriname, pending further discussions. In consultation was discussed that SC Heerenveen's talents do not take over, but they are indefinitely will continue to assist in Suriname. In September 2009, Drenthe invited to Belgium internship will run from Germinal Beerschot. Drenthe came However, during his internship little games. The young striker got injured and could therefore not participate in the game against the promises of Zulte Waregem. then signed Drenthe in the summer of 2010 a contract with the Surinamese club SV Excelsior.

== International career ==
Having played for the Surinamese youth teams shad, he made his debut in 2009 in the Suriname-A team. Due to his good performance during the 2008–09 season with both the Suriname under-20 side and SV Transvaal, Drenthe was included by coach Wensley Bundel included in the Surinamese squad for the Parbo Cup. With Drenthe, Suriname obtained a second-place finish in the four-Nations Tournament. In August 2010, Drenthe caused a stir: although Drenthe was called by acting coach Ricardo Winter, the attacker was undertaking an internship in Belgium and he forgot to decline for a match of the Suriname team. Drenthe was recalled by coach Kenneth Jaliens for the 2014 FIFA World Cup qualifiers.

== Career statistics ==
Season	Club	Country	Competition	Apps	Goals
2007–08	SV Voorwaarts	Suriname	Hoofdklasse	4	1
2008–09	SV Voorwaarts	Suriname	Hoofdklasse	7	2
2009–10	SV Voorwaarts	Suriname	Hoofdklasse	-	-
2010–11	SV Excelsior	Suriname	Hoofdklasse	2	5
