= Emilio Limón =

Surinamese footballer

Personal information
- Date of birth: 4 December 1988 (age 37)
- Place of birth: Suriname
- Position: Midfielder

Team information
- Current team: Robinhood

Senior career*
Years	Team	Apps	(Gls)
2007–	Robinhood	?	(?)

International career^{‡}
2008–	Suriname	20	(2)
- * Club domestic league appearances and goals as of 15:52, 15 November 2010 (UTC) ‡ National team caps and goals as of 21:27, 20 January 2012 (UTC)

Emilio Limón (born 4 December 1988) is a Surinamese international footballer who plays as a midfielder for Robinhood.

== Career ==
Limón began his senior career in 2007 with Robinhood. Limón was one of eight players from Suriname to train with English team Sunderland in March 2008.

Limón made his international debut in June 2008, and made a total of 7 World Cup Qualifying appearances that year.
