= Reinhard Breinburg =

Dutch-born Aruban footballer

Personal information
- Date of birth: May 2, 1984 (age 42)
- Place of birth: Purmerend, Netherlands
- Height: 1.83 m (6 ft 0 in)
- Position: Defender

Youth career
- Feyenoord

Senior career*
Years	Team	Apps	(Gls)
2004–2010	Dordrecht	132	(2)
2010–2012	Barendrecht	40	(0)
2012–2014	Quick Boys	41	(0)
2014–2015	Dakota		
2015–2016	Independiente Caravel		
2021–2022	Britannia		

International career
2011–2014	Aruba	13	(0)
- * Club domestic league appearances and goals as of 31 May 2015

Reinhard Richard Breinburg (born May 2, 1984, in Purmerend, Netherlands) is a naturalized Aruban retired football defender.

== Club career ==
He played in the Feyenoord academy and joined Dordrecht in 2004. At Dordrecht, Breinburg was tested positive for use of an illegal substance. He was later suspended by the Dutch FA for use of cannabis. In 2010, he joined amateur side Barendrecht and he moved to Quick Boys two years later.

He left Quick Boys in 2014 and moved to Aruba to work on the island.

== International career ==
Breinburg made his debut for Aruba in a December 2011 friendly match against Suriname and earned a total of 13 caps scoring no goals.
