= SV Racing Club Aruba =

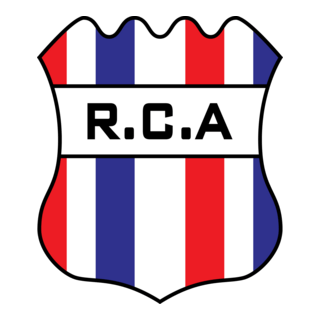
- Full name: Sport Vereniging Racing Club Aruba
- Founded: 1934; 92 years ago, as A.B.C.
- Ground: Guillermo P. Trinidad Stadium, Oranjestad, Aruba
- Capacity: 2,500
- Manager: Veron Albertsz
- League: Aruban Division di Honor
- 2024–25: 3rd

Sport Vereniging Racing Club Aruba, known as SV Racing Club Aruba or RCA, is an Aruban professional football club based in Oranjestad, which currently play in Aruban Division di Honor, the nation's top-level league. As of 2023, they have won 17 titles since the league's creation under the auspices of the Arubaanse Voetbal Bond, and 33 in total.

== Achievements ==
- Aruba Shield/Aruban Division di Honor: 33

1938, 1939, 1940, 1941, 1942, 1945, 1946, 1947, 1948, 1950, 1951, 1952–53, 1954, 1956, 1957, 1959, 1960, 1964, 1967, 1978, 1979, 1986, 1987, 1991, 1994, 2002, 2007–08, 2010–11, 2011–12, 2014–15, 2015–16, 2018–19, 2022–23

- Netherlands Antilles Championship: 1

1965

- Torneo Copa Betico Croes: 5

2011–12, 2015–16, 2019–20, 2020–21, 2021–22

== Performance in CONCACAF competitions ==
As of 17 September 2013

Competition	Season	Round	Country	Club	Home	Away	Agg.
CONCACAF Champions' Cup	1992	Caribbean Zone Round 1	Netherlands Antilles	RKVFC Sithoc	3–2	2–5	5–7
CONCACAF Champions' Cup	1994	Caribbean Zone Prelim	Suriname	SV Robinhood	2–1	0–7	2–8
CONCACAF Cup Winners Cup	1995	Caribbean Zone Prelim	Guadeloupe	Arsenal (Petit-Bourg)	0–1	1–2	1–3

- CFU Club Championship: 1 appearance

2007: First Round (stage 1 of 4) – (3rd in Group B, 1 pt)
