= 2014 FIFA World Cup qualification – CONCACAF second round =

Football tournament qualification stage

This page provides the summaries of the CONCACAF second round matches for 2014 FIFA World Cup qualification.

== Format ==
The second round saw the teams ranked 7–25 joined by the 5 winners from the first round. These teams were drawn into six groups of four teams, at the World Cup Preliminary Draw at the Marina da Glória in Rio de Janeiro, Brazil on 30 July 2011.

The matches were played between 2 September to 15 November 2011. The top team from each group advanced to the third round.

== Seeding ==
Teams were seeded into four pots – designated pots 4 to 7 in the draw. Pot 4 included teams ranked 7–12, pot 5 teams ranked 13–18, pot 6 teams ranked 19–24, and pot 7 the team ranked 25 along with the 5 first-round winners.

Pot 4	Pot 5	Pot 6	Pot 7
Panama; Canada; El Salvador; Grenada; Trinidad and Tobago; Haiti	Antigua and Barbuda; Guyana; Suriname; Saint Kitts and Nevis; Guatemala; Dominica	Puerto Rico; Barbados; Curaçao; Saint Vincent and the Grenadines; Cayman Islands; Nicaragua	Bermuda; Belize^{†} Dominican Republic^{†} Saint Lucia^{†} Bahamas^{†} U.S. Virgin Islands^{†}

^{†} First-round winners

== Groups ==
=== Group A ===
Pos	Team	Pld	W	D	L	GF	GA	GD	Pts	Qualification	El Salvador national football team	Dominican Republic national football team	Suriname national football team	Cayman Islands national football team
1	El Salvador	6	6	0	0	20	5	+15	18	Advance to third round	—	3–2	4–0	4–0
2	Dominican Republic	6	2	2	2	12	8	+4	8		1–2	—	1–1	4–0
3	Suriname	6	2	1	3	5	11	−6	7		1–3	1–3	—	1–0
4	Cayman Islands	6	0	1	5	2	15	−13	1		1–4	1–1	0–1	—

2 September 2011
18:00 UTC−3

Suriname	1–0	Cayman Islands
Mando 11' (pen.)	Report

André Kamperveen Stadion, Paramaribo
Attendance: 1,000
Referee: Adrian Skeete (Barbados)
2 September 2011
19:30 UTC−6

El Salvador	3–2	Dominican Republic
Zelaya 54', 77' (pen.); Bautista 63'	Report	Cruz 66'; Peralta 89'

Estadio Cuscatlán, San Salvador
Attendance: 25,272
Referee: José Luis Rodríguez (Panama)

6 September 2011
15:00 UTC−4

Dominican Republic	1–1	Suriname
Ozuna 68'	Report	Mando 25' (pen.)

Estadio Panamericano, San Cristóbal
Attendance: 2,300
Referee: Raúl Castro (Honduras)
6 September 2011
19:30 UTC−5

Cayman Islands	1–4	El Salvador
M. Ebanks 73' (pen.)	Report	Bautista 49'; Anaya 62', 80'; García 90+3'

Truman Bodden Stadium, George Town
Attendance: 2,200
Referee: Elmar Rodas (Guatemala)

7 October 2011
15:05 UTC−4

Dominican Republic	1–2	El Salvador
Ozuna 54'	Report	Romero 37' (pen.); Blanco 67'

Estadio Panamericano, San Cristóbal
Attendance: 2,323
Referee: Ricardo Cerdas (Costa Rica)
7 October 2011
19:30 UTC−5

Cayman Islands	0–1	Suriname
	Report	Drenthe 57'

Truman Bodden Stadium, George Town
Attendance: 2,100
Referee: Edvin Jurisevic (United States)

11 October 2011
18:00 UTC−3

Suriname	1–3	Dominican Republic
Kwasie 81'	Report	Faña 9'; Ozuna 47', 76'

André Kamperveen Stadion, Paramaribo
Attendance: 1,200
Referee: Paul Ward (Canada)
11 October 2011
19:30 UTC−6

El Salvador	4–0	Cayman Islands
Turcios 6'; Purdy 13'; J. Alas 45'; Sosa 88' (pen.)	Report

Estadio Cuscatlán, San Salvador
Attendance: 17,570
Referee: Hugo Cruz (Costa Rica)

11 November 2011
15:00 UTC−4

Dominican Republic	4–0	Cayman Islands
Navarro 17'; Ozuna 38'; Rodríguez 64'; Morillo 79'	Report

Estadio Panamericano, San Cristóbal
Attendance: 1,000
Referee: José Guerrero (Nicaragua)
11 November 2011
20:03 UTC−3

Suriname	1–3	El Salvador
Esperance 81'	Report	Blanco 21', 58'; Sánchez 78'

André Kamperveen Stadion, Paramaribo
Attendance: 500
Referee: Marcos Brea (Cuba)

14 November 2011
19:30 UTC−5

Cayman Islands	1–1	Dominican Republic
M. Ebanks 72'	Report	García 41'

Truman Bodden Stadium, George Town
Attendance: 1,750
Referee: James Matthew (Saint Kitts and Nevis)
15 November 2011
19:30 UTC−6

El Salvador	4–0	Suriname
Romero 33', 62'; Burgos 76', 83'	Report

Estadio Cuscatlán, San Salvador
Attendance: 9,659
Referee: Javier Santos (Puerto Rico)

=== Group B ===
Pos	Team	Pld	W	D	L	GF	GA	GD	Pts	Qualification	Guyana national football team	Trinidad and Tobago national football team	Bermuda national football team	Barbados national football team
1	Guyana	6	4	1	1	9	6	+3	13	Advance to third round	—	2–1	2–1	2–0
2	Trinidad and Tobago	6	4	0	2	12	4	+8	12		3–0 (Note: Match awarded)	—	1–0	4–0
3	Bermuda	6	3	1	2	8	7	+1	10		1–1	2–1	—	2–1
4	Barbados	6	0	0	6	2	14	−12	0		0–2	0–2	1–2	—

Notes:
2 September 2011
16:00 UTC−4

Trinidad and Tobago	1–0	Bermuda
Jones 45'	Report

Hasely Crawford Stadium, Port of Spain
Attendance: 6,000
Referee: Jafeth Perea (Panama)
2 September 2011
20:00 UTC−4

Guyana	2–0	Barbados
Beveney 26'; Pollard 73'	Report

Providence Stadium, Providence
Attendance: 4,500
Referee: Canaan St Catherine (Saint Lucia)

6 September 2011
16:00 UTC−4

Barbados	0–2	Trinidad and Tobago
	Report	Daniel 17'; Roberts 67'

Barbados National Stadium, Bridgetown
Attendance: 775
Referee: Elmer Bonilla (El Salvador)
6 September 2011
20:00 UTC−4

Guyana	2–1	Bermuda
Mills 50', 60'	Report	Smith 90'

Providence Stadium, Providence
Attendance: 3,500
Referee: Mark Geiger (United States)

7 October 2011
16:00 UTC−4

Barbados	0–2	Guyana
	Report	Abrams 73'; Nurse 87'

Barbados National Stadium, Bridgetown
Attendance: 2,500
Referee: Alain Georges (Haiti)
7 October 2011
20:00 UTC−3

Bermuda	2–1	Trinidad and Tobago
Russell 52'; Wells 63'	Report	Molino 82'

Bermuda National Stadium, Devonshire Parish
Attendance: 2,243
Referee: Jeffrey Solís (Costa Rica)

11 October 2011
17:00 UTC−4

Trinidad and Tobago	4–0	Barbados
Peltier 6', 55', 63'; Hector 90'	Report

Hasely Crawford Stadium, Port of Spain
Attendance: 3,000
Referee: Raymond Bogle (Jamaica)
11 October 2011
20:00 UTC−3

Bermuda	1–1	Guyana
Nusum 71'	Report	Shakes 81'

Bermuda National Stadium, Devonshire Parish
Attendance: 2,573
Referee: Rudolph Angela (Aruba)

11 November 2011
15:00 UTC−4

Bermuda	2–1	Barbados
Smith 28' (pen.); Steede 49'	Report	Adamson 7'

Bermuda National Stadium, Devonshire Parish
Attendance: 1,000
Referee: Otto Barrios (Guatemala)
11 November 2011
20:00 UTC−4

Guyana	2–1	Trinidad and Tobago
Shakes 10'; L. Cort 81'	Report	Jones 90+3'

Providence Stadium, Providence
Attendance: 18,000
Referee: Enrico Wijngaarde (Suriname)

14 November 2011
20:00 UTC−4

Barbados	1–2	Bermuda
Grosvenor 90+2'	Report	Wells 46'; Smith 72' (pen.)

Bermuda National Stadium, Devonshire Parish (Bermuda)
Attendance: 1,000
Referee: Roberto Moreno (Panama)
15 November 2011
17:00 UTC−4

Trinidad and Tobago	3–0 Awarded (Note: FIFA awarded Trinidad and Tobago a 3–0 win as a result of Guyana fielding the ineligible player Christopher Bourne. The match originally ended 2–0 to Trinidad and Tobago.)	Guyana
Jones 59'; Peltier 69'	Report

Hasely Crawford Stadium, Port of Spain
Attendance: 2,000
Referee: Marlon Mejía (El Salvador)

=== Group C ===
Pos	Team	Pld	W	D	L	GF	GA	GD	Pts	Qualification	Panama national football team	Nicaragua national football team	Dominica national football team
1	Panama	4	4	0	0	15	2	+13	12	Advance to third round	—	5–1	3–0
2	Nicaragua	4	2	0	2	5	7	−2	6		1–2	—	1–0
3	Dominica	4	0	0	4	0	11	−11	0		0–5	0–2	—

Bahamas withdrew from the tournament on 19 August 2011 and were not replaced.

2 September 2011
18:00 UTC−4

Dominica	0–2	Nicaragua
	Report	Leguías 1'; Rodríguez 36'

Windsor Park, Roseau
Attendance: 3,000
Referee: Valdin Legister (Jamaica)

6 September 2011
19:00 UTC−6

Nicaragua	1–2	Panama
Torres 18' (o.g.)	Report	Tejada 7'; Pérez 50'

Estadio Nacional de Fútbol, Managua
Attendance: 10,521
Referee: Oscar Reyna (Guatemala)

7 October 2011
18:00 UTC−4

Dominica	0–5	Panama
	Report	Waithe 26', 89'; Tejada 34'; Pérez 57'; Buitrago 62'

Windsor Park, Roseau
Attendance: 4,000
Referee: Enrico Wijngaarde (Suriname)

11 October 2011
20:00 UTC−5

Panama	5–1	Nicaragua
Tejada 27', 64'; Pérez 48', 51', 87'	Report	Reyes 88'

Estadio Rommel Fernández, Panama City
Attendance: 10,846
Referee: Edenilson Ventura (El Salvador)

11 November 2011
19:00 UTC−6

Nicaragua	1–0	Dominica
Leguías 57'	Report

Estadio Nacional de Fútbol, Managua
Attendance: 2,100
Referee: Hugo Cruz (Costa Rica)

15 November 2011
20:00 UTC−5

Panama	3–0	Dominica
Blackburn 6'; Buitrago 20'; Pérez 84'	Report

Estadio Rommel Fernández, Panama City
Attendance: 8,000
Referee: Terry Vaughn (United States)

=== Group D ===
Pos	Team	Pld	W	D	L	GF	GA	GD	Pts	Qualification	Canada men's national soccer team	Puerto Rico national football team	Saint Kitts and Nevis national football team	Saint Lucia national football team
1	Canada	6	4	2	0	18	1	+17	14	Advance to third round	—	0–0	4–0	4–1
2	Puerto Rico	6	2	3	1	8	4	+4	9		0–3	—	1–1	3–0
3	Saint Kitts and Nevis	6	1	4	1	6	8	−2	7		0–0	0–0	—	1–1
4	Saint Lucia	6	0	1	5	4	23	−19	1		0–7 (Note: Match awarded)	0–4	2–4	—

Notes:
2 September 2011
20:00 UTC−4

Canada	4–1	Saint Lucia
Simpson 6', 61'; De Rosario 50' (pen.); Johnson 90+1'	Report	Paul 7'

BMO Field, Toronto
Attendance: 11,500
Referee: Jair Marrufo (United States)
2 September 2011
20:00 UTC−4

Saint Kitts and Nevis	0–0	Puerto Rico
	Report

Warner Park, Basseterre
Attendance: 2,500
Referee: Ricardo Arellano (Mexico)

6 September 2011
18:00 UTC−4

Saint Lucia	2–4	Saint Kitts and Nevis
Pierre 65'; Valcin 84'	Report	Lake 7'; Francis 12'; Mitchum 15'; Elliott 44'

Beausejour Stadium, Gros Islet
Attendance: 2,005
Referee: Kevin Thomas (Jamaica)
6 September 2011
20:00 UTC−4

Puerto Rico	0–3	Canada
	Report	Hume 42'; Jackson 84'; Ricketts 90+3'

Estadio Juan Ramón Loubriel, Bayamón
Attendance: 4,000
Referee: Enrico Wijngaarde (Suriname)

7 October 2011
18:00 UTC−4

Saint Lucia	0–7 Awarded (Note: FIFA awarded Canada a 7–0 win as a result of Saint Lucia fielding the ineligible player Jamil Joseph. The match originally ended 7–0 to Canada.)	Canada
	Report	Jackson 18', 28', 40'; Occéan 34', 51'; Hume 72', 86'

Beausejour Stadium, Gros Islet
Attendance: 1,005
Referee: Rolando Vidal (Panama)
7 October 2011
20:00 UTC−4

Puerto Rico	1–1	Saint Kitts and Nevis
Cabrero 37'	Report	Lake 59'

Estadio Juan Ramón Loubriel, Bayamón
Attendance: 2,500
Referee: Neal Brizan (Trinidad and Tobago)

11 October 2011
19:00 UTC−4

Canada	0–0	Puerto Rico
	Report

BMO Field, Toronto
Attendance: 12,178
Referee: Stanley Lancaster (Guyana)
11 October 2011
20:00 UTC−4

Saint Kitts and Nevis	1–1	Saint Lucia
Lake 83'	Report	Valcin 74'

Warner Park, Basseterre
Attendance: 1,000
Referee: Adrian Skeete (Barbados)

11 November 2011
20:00 UTC−4

Saint Kitts and Nevis	0–0	Canada
	Report

Warner Park, Basseterre
Attendance: 4,000
Referee: Elmer Bonilla (El Salvador)
11 November 2011
20:00 UTC−4

Saint Lucia	0–4 Awarded (Note: FIFA awarded Puerto Rico a 4–0 win as a result of Saint Lucia fielding the ineligible player Pernal Williams. The match originally ended 4–0 to Puerto Rico.)	Puerto Rico
	Report	Arrieta 4'; Ramos 14', 46'; Cabrero 54'

Estadio Juan Ramón Loubriel, Bayamón (Puerto Rico)
Attendance: 350
Referee: Kenville Holder (Cayman Islands)

14 November 2011
20:00 UTC−4

Puerto Rico	3–0	Saint Lucia
Ramos 13', 85'; Marrero 87'	Report

Mayagüez Athletics Stadium, Mayagüez
Attendance: 1,050
Referee: Bryan Willett (Antigua and Barbuda)
15 November 2011
19:00 UTC−5

Canada	4–0	Saint Kitts and Nevis
Occéan 28'; De Rosario 36' (pen.); Simpson 45+3'; Ricketts 88'	Report

BMO Field, Toronto
Attendance: 10,235
Referee: Ricardo Cerdas (Costa Rica)

=== Group E ===
Pos	Team	Pld	W	D	L	GF	GA	GD	Pts	Qualification	Guatemala national football team	Belize national football team	Saint Vincent and the Grenadines national football team	Grenada national football team
1	Guatemala	6	6	0	0	19	3	+16	18	Advance to third round	—	3–1	4–0	3–0
2	Belize	6	2	1	3	9	10	−1	7		1–2	—	1–1	1–4
3	Saint Vincent and the Grenadines	6	1	2	3	4	12	−8	5		0–3	0–2	—	2–1
4	Grenada	6	1	1	4	7	14	−7	4		1–4	0–3	1–1	—

2 September 2011
15:30 UTC−4

Grenada	0–3	Belize
	Report	McCaulay 11', 79'; Róches 35'

Grenada National Stadium, St. George's
Attendance: 2,600
Referee: David Rubalcaba (Cuba)
2 September 2011
20:00 UTC−6

Guatemala	4–0	Saint Vincent and the Grenadines
Pappa 15'; Flores 31'; Rodríguez 53'; García 71'	Report

Estadio Nacional Mateo Flores, Guatemala City
Attendance: 24,000
Referee: Erick Andino (Honduras)

6 September 2011
16:05 UTC−6

Belize	1–2	Guatemala
McCaulay 77'	Report	Cabrera 4'; M. López 75'

FFB Field, Belmopan
Attendance: 3,027
Referee: Marlon Mejía (El Salvador)
18 September 2011
15:00 UTC−4

Saint Vincent and the Grenadines	2–1	Grenada
M. Samuel 22'; Stewart 72'	Report	Langaigne 76'

Arnos Vale Stadium, Kingstown
Attendance: 2,500
Referee: Paul Ward (Canada)

7 October 2011
15:05 UTC−4

Saint Vincent and the Grenadines	0–3	Guatemala
	Report	Rodríguez 44', 58'; Pezzarossi 71'

Arnos Vale Stadium, Kingstown
Attendance: 3,000
Referee: Marcos Brea (Cuba)
7 October 2011
15:30 UTC−6

Belize	1–4	Grenada
Simpson 90'	Report	Rennie 37'; Julien 41'; Lancaster Joseph 50'; Murray 80'

FFB Field, Belmopan
Attendance: 1,200
Referee: Franklin Jarquín (Nicaragua)

11 October 2011
20:00 UTC−6

Guatemala	3–1	Belize
Gallardo 8' (pen.); M. López 65'; C. Ruiz 78' (pen.)	Report	McCaulay 31'

Estadio Nacional Mateo Flores, Guatemala City
Attendance: 21,107
Referee: José Alfredo Peñaloza (Mexico)
15 October 2011
15:00 UTC−4

Grenada	1–1	Saint Vincent and the Grenadines
Murray 90+2'	Report	M. Samuel 62'

Grenada National Stadium, St. George's
Attendance: 2,000
Referee: Bryan Willett (Antigua and Barbuda)

11 November 2011
15:30 UTC−6

Belize	1–1	Saint Vincent and the Grenadines
McCaulay 22'	Report	Stewart 11'

FFB Field, Belmopan
Attendance: 300
Referee: Adrian Skeete (Barbados)
11 November 2011
20:00 UTC−6

Guatemala	3–0	Grenada
García 1', 31'; Padilla 45'	Report

Estadio Nacional Mateo Flores, Guatemala City
Attendance: 13,710
Referee: Neal Brizan (Trinidad and Tobago)

15 November 2011
15:00 UTC−4

Grenada	1–4	Guatemala
Rennie 37' (pen.)	Report	Williams 67' (o.g.); Thompson 77'; Ramírez 84'; Lyndon Joseph 90' (o.g.)

Grenada National Stadium, St. George's
Attendance: 200
Referee: Rudolph Angela (Aruba)
15 November 2011
15:00 UTC−4

Saint Vincent and the Grenadines	0–2	Belize
	Report	McCaulay 78', 81' (pen.)

Arnos Vale Stadium, Kingstown
Attendance: 500
Referee: Kevin Thomas (Jamaica)

=== Group F ===
Pos	Team	Pld	W	D	L	GF	GA	GD	Pts	Qualification	Antigua and Barbuda national football team	Haiti national football team	Curaçao national football team	United States Virgin Islands national soccer team
1	Antigua and Barbuda	6	5	0	1	28	5	+23	15	Advance to third round	—	1–0	5–2	10–0
2	Haiti	6	4	1	1	21	6	+15	13		2–1	—	2–2	6–0
3	Curaçao	6	2	1	3	15	15	0	7		0–3 (Note: Match awarded)	2–4	—	6–1
4	U.S. Virgin Islands	6	0	0	6	2	40	−38	0		1–8	0–7	0–3	—

Notes:
2 September 2011
15:00 UTC−5

Haiti	6–0	U.S. Virgin Islands
Marcelin 18'; Maurice 27'; Pierre-Louis 44'; Monuma 61'; Alexandre 65', 78'	Report

Stade Sylvio Cator, Port-au-Prince
Attendance: 12,000
Referee: Hugo Cruz (Costa Rica)
2 September 2011
19:00 UTC−4

Antigua and Barbuda	5–2	Curaçao
M. Joseph 42'; Griffith 45+2'; T. Thomas 54'; Byers 75', 80'	Report	Meulens 9'; Siberie 74'

Sir Vivian Richards Stadium, North Sound
Attendance: 2,000
Referee: Javier Santos (Puerto Rico)

6 September 2011
15:30 UTC−4

U.S. Virgin Islands	1–8	Antigua and Barbuda
Browne 49'	Report	Christian 18'; Byers 38' (pen.), 51', 57'; Cochrane 47'; Dublin 54'; Burton 68', 74'

Paul E. Joseph Stadium, Frederiksted
Attendance: 250
Referee: Stanley Lancaster (Guyana)
6 September 2011
20:00 UTC−4

Curaçao	2–4	Haiti
de Waard 12'; Zimmerman 43'	Report	Lafrance 37'; Marcelin 58'; Guerrier 61'; Zimmerman 75' (o.g.)

Stadion Ergilio Hato, Willemstad
Attendance: 5,000
Referee: Jeffrey Solís (Costa Rica)

7 October 2011
16:00 UTC−4

U.S. Virgin Islands	0–7	Haiti
	Report	Maurice 5', 66', 82' (pen.); Jaggy 11'; Belfort 57', 74' (pen.); Goreux 64'

Paul E. Joseph Stadium, Frederiksted
Attendance: 406
Referee: Kenville Holder (Cayman Islands)
7 October 2011
20:00 UTC−4

Curaçao	0–3 Awarded (Note: FIFA awarded Antigua and Barbuda a 3–0 win as a result of Curacao fielding the ineligible player Christy Bonevacia. The match originally ended 1–0 to Antigua and Barbuda.)	Antigua and Barbuda
	Report	T. Thomas 73'

Stadion Ergilio Hato, Willemstad
Attendance: 2,563
Referee: Oscar Reyna (Guatemala)

11 October 2011
15:00 UTC−5

Haiti	2–2	Curaçao
Maurice 25' (pen.); Belfort 60'	Report	Siberie 7'; Bito 14'

Stade Sylvio Cator, Port-au-Prince
Attendance: 7,800
Referee: Leo Clarke (Saint Lucia)
11 October 2011
19:00 UTC−4

Antigua and Barbuda	10–0	U.S. Virgin Islands
T. Thomas 7', 41', 78'; Byers 24', 31', 40'; Burton 55', 65'; J. Thomas 86'; Murtagh 90+2'	Report

Sir Vivian Richards Stadium, North Sound
Attendance: 1,500
Referee: James Matthew (Saint Kitts and Nevis)

11 November 2011
16:00 UTC−4

U.S. Virgin Islands	0–3	Curaçao
	Report	Siberie 8', 14'; Bito 26'

Paul E. Joseph Stadium, Frederiksted
Attendance: 210
Referee: Mauricio Navarro (Canada)
11 November 2011
19:00 UTC−4

Antigua and Barbuda	1–0	Haiti
Skepple 81'	Report

Sir Vivian Richards Stadium, North Sound
Attendance: 8,000
Referee: José Pineda (Honduras)

15 November 2011
15:00 UTC−5

Haiti	2–1	Antigua and Barbuda
Aveska 60'; Belfort 67'	Report	T. Thomas 10'

Stade Sylvio Cator, Port-au-Prince
Attendance: 3,000
Referee: Baldomero Toledo (United States)
15 November 2011
20:00 UTC−4

Curaçao	6–1	U.S. Virgin Islands
Carmelia 33', 78'; Siberie 40', 86'; Espacia 73'; Cijntje 90'	Report	Cornelius 51'

Stadion Ergilio Hato, Willemstad
Attendance: 2,000
Referee: Valdin Legister (Jamaica)

== Goalscorers ==
There were 228 goals scored in 66 matches, for an average of 3.45 goals per match.

8 goals

- (Antigua and Barbuda) Peter Byers

7 goals

- (Belize) Deon McCaulay

6 goals

- (Antigua and Barbuda) Tamarley Thomas
- (Curaçao) Rocky Siberie
- (Panama) Blas Pérez

5 goals

- (Dominican Republic) Erick Ozuna
- (Haiti) Jean-Eudes Maurice

4 goals

- (Antigua and Barbuda) Randolph Burton
- (Canada) Simeon Jackson
- (Haiti) Kervens Belfort
- (Panama) Luis Tejada
- (Puerto Rico) Héctor Ramos
- (Trinidad and Tobago) Lester Peltier

3 goals

- (Bermuda) Khano Smith
- (Canada) Iain Hume
- (Canada) Olivier Occean
- (Canada) Josh Simpson
- (El Salvador) Léster Blanco
- (El Salvador) Osael Romero
- (Guatemala) Freddy García
- (Guatemala) Mario Rodríguez
- (Saint Kitts and Nevis) Ian Lake
- (Trinidad and Tobago) Kenwyne Jones

2 goals

- (Bermuda) Nahki Wells
- (Canada) Dwayne De Rosario
- (Canada) Tosaint Ricketts
- (Cayman Islands) Mark Ebanks
- (Curaçao) Sendley Bito
- (Curaçao) Shanon Carmelia
- (El Salvador) Luis Anaya
- (El Salvador) Christian Bautista
- (El Salvador) Rafael Burgos
- (El Salvador) Rodolfo Zelaya
- (Grenada) Clive Murray
- (Grenada) Shane Rennie
- (Guatemala) Minor López
- (Guyana) Vurlon Mills
- (Guyana) Ricky Shakes
- (Haiti) Jean Alexandre
- (Haiti) James Marcelin
- (Nicaragua) Raúl Leguías
- (Panama) Ricardo Buitrago
- (Panama) Amir Waithe
- (Puerto Rico) Andrés Cabrero
- (Saint Lucia) Cliff Valcin
- (Saint Vincent and the Grenadines) Myron Samuel
- (Saint Vincent and the Grenadines) Cornelius Stewart
- (Suriname) Friso Mando

1 goal

- (Antigua and Barbuda) Ranjae Christian
- (Antigua and Barbuda) Justin Cochrane
- (Antigua and Barbuda) George Dublin
- (Antigua and Barbuda) Quinton Griffith
- (Antigua and Barbuda) Marc Joseph
- (Antigua and Barbuda) Keiran Murtagh
- (Antigua and Barbuda) Kerry Skepple
- (Antigua and Barbuda) Jamie Thomas
- (Barbados) Diquan Adamson
- (Barbados) Sheridan Grosvenor
- (Belize) Harrison Róches
- (Belize) Ryan Simpson
- (Bermuda) John Nusum
- (Bermuda) Antwan Russell
- (Bermuda) Kwame Steede
- (Canada) Will Johnson
- (Curaçao) Angelo Cijntje
- (Curaçao) Orin de Waard
- (Curaçao) Everon Espacia
- (Curaçao) Rihairo Meulens
- (Curaçao) Angelo Zimmerman
- (Dominican Republic) Johan Cruz
- (Dominican Republic) César García
- (Dominican Republic) Jonathan Faña
- (Dominican Republic) Jack Michael Morillo
- (Dominican Republic) Inoel Navarro
- (Dominican Republic) Domingo Peralta
- (Dominican Republic) Kerbi Rodríguez
- (El Salvador) Jaime Alas
- (El Salvador) Xavier García
- (El Salvador) Steve Purdy
- (El Salvador) Edwin Sánchez
- (El Salvador) Herbert Sosa
- (El Salvador) Victor Turcios
- (Grenada) Lancaster Joseph
- (Grenada) Marcus Julien
- (Grenada) Cassim Langaigne
- (Guatemala) Gustavo Cabrera
- (Guatemala) Yony Flores
- (Guatemala) Carlos Gallardo
- (Guatemala) Angelo Padilla
- (Guatemala) Marco Pappa
- (Guatemala) Dwight Pezzarossi
- (Guatemala) Guillermo Ramírez
- (Guatemala) Carlos Ruiz
- (Guatemala) Fredy Thompson
- (Guyana) Anthony Abrams
- (Guyana) Shawn Beveney
- (Guyana) Leon Cort
- (Guyana) Chris Nurse
- (Guyana) Charles Pollard
- (Haiti) Judelin Aveska
- (Haiti) Réginal Goreux
- (Haiti) Wilde Donald Guerrier
- (Haiti) Kim Jaggy
- (Haiti) Kevin Lafrance
- (Haiti) Jean Monuma
- (Haiti) Listner Pierre-Louis
- (Nicaragua) Daniel Reyes
- (Nicaragua) Félix Rodríguez
- (Panama) Rolando Blackburn
- (Puerto Rico) Cristian Arrieta
- (Puerto Rico) Joseph Marrero
- (Saint Kitts and Nevis) Devaughn Elliott
- (Saint Kitts and Nevis) Jevon Francis
- (Saint Kitts and Nevis) Orlando Mitchum
- (Saint Lucia) Tremain Paul
- (Saint Lucia) Zaine Pierre
- (Suriname) Giovanni Drenthe
- (Suriname) Evani Esperance
- (Suriname) Naldo Kwasie
- (Trinidad and Tobago) Keon Daniel
- (Trinidad and Tobago) Hughton Hector
- (Trinidad and Tobago) Kevin Molino
- (Trinidad and Tobago) Darryl Roberts
- (United States Virgin Islands) Jamie Browne
- (United States Virgin Islands) Keithroy Cornelius

1 own goal

- (Curaçao) Angelo Zimmerman (against Haiti)
- (Grenada) Lyndon Joseph (against Guatemala)
- (Grenada) Nicko Williams (against Guatemala)
- (Panama) Román Torres (against Nicaragua)
