= 2012 CONCACAF Men's Olympic Qualifying Championship squads =

The 2012 CONCACAF Men's Olympic Qualifying Championship was an international football tournament that was held in the United States from 22 March to 2 April 2012. The eight national teams involved in the tournament were required to register a squad of twenty players, two of whom had to be goalkeepers.

The final lists were published by CONCACAF.

The age listed for each player is on 22 March 2012, the first day of the tournament. A flag is included for coaches who are of a different nationality than their own national team. Players marked in bold have been capped at full international level.

== Group A ==
=== El Salvador ===
Coach: Mauricio Alfaro

No.	Pos.	Player	Date of birth (age)	Caps	Club
1	GK	Diego Cuéllar	10 August 1990 (aged 21)		(El Salvador) Atlético Marte
2	DF	Milton Molina	2 February 1989 (aged 23)		(El Salvador) Isidro Metapán
3	MF	Marlon Martínez	3 September 1992 (aged 19)		(El Salvador) Luis Ángel Firpo
4	DF	Xavier García (c)	26 June 1990 (aged 21)		(El Salvador) Luis Ángel Firpo
5	DF	Alexander Mendoza	4 June 1990 (aged 21)		Universidad de El Salvador
6	MF	Elman Rivas	1 June 1992 (aged 19)		(El Salvador) Alianza
7	FW	Dustin Corea	21 March 1992 (aged 20)		(Denmark) Blokhus
8	MF	Diego Chavarría	28 February 1990 (aged 22)		(El Salvador) Once Municipal
9	FW	Isidro Gutiérrez	21 October 1989 (aged 22)		(El Salvador) Águila
10	MF	Jaime Alas	30 July 1989 (aged 22)		(El Salvador) Luis Ángel Firpo
11	FW	Jonathan Águila	11 November 1990 (aged 21)		(El Salvador) Águila
12	MF	Edwin Sánchez	21 February 1990 (aged 22)		(El Salvador) Isidro Metapán
13	DF	Alexander Larin	27 June 1992 (aged 19)		(El Salvador) Atlético Marte
14	MF	Herbert Sosa	11 January 1990 (aged 22)		(El Salvador) Alianza
15	MF	Jorge Morán	4 October 1989 (aged 22)		(El Salvador) Isidro Metapán
16	MF	Richard Menjivar	31 October 1990 (aged 21)		(United States) California State University, Bakersfield
17	FW	Léster Blanco	17 January 1989 (aged 23)		(El Salvador) Isidro Metapán
18	GK	Jimmy Cuéllar	20 October 1989 (aged 22)		(El Salvador) Alianza
19	MF	Darwin Cerén	31 December 1989 (aged 22)		(El Salvador) Juventud Independiente
20	MF	Andrés Flores	31 August 1990 (aged 21)		(Denmark) Viborg

=== Canada ===
Coach: (Portugal) Tony Fonseca

No.	Pos.	Player	Date of birth (age)	Caps	Club
1	GK	Adam Janssen	14 January 1990 (aged 22)		(United States) Minnesota Stars
2	DF	Andrés Fresenga	13 October 1992 (aged 19)		(Uruguay) Racing Club
3	MF	Russell Teibert	22 December 1992 (aged 19)		(Canada) Vancouver Whitecaps FC
4	DF	Nana Attakora (c)	27 March 1989 (aged 22)		(Finland) FC Haka
5	DF	Doneil Henry	20 April 1993 (aged 18)		(Canada) Toronto FC
6	MF	Kyle Bekker	2 September 1990 (aged 21)		(United States) Boston College
7	MF	Bryce Alderson	5 February 1994 (aged 18)		(Canada) Vancouver Whitecaps FC
8	MF	Samuel Piette	12 November 1994 (aged 17)		(France) Metz
9	MF	Shaun Saiko	13 November 1989 (aged 22)		(Canada) FC Edmonton
10	FW	Marcus Haber	11 January 1989 (aged 23)		(Scotland) St Johnstone
11	DF	Matt Stinson	9 September 1992 (aged 19)		(Canada) Toronto FC
12	FW	Babayele Sodade	26 July 1990 (aged 21)		(United States) Seattle Sounders FC
13	FW	Lucas Cavallini	28 December 1992 (aged 19)		(Uruguay) Nacional
14	DF	Philippe Davies	12 December 1990 (aged 21)		(United States) Richmond Kickers
15	MF	Sherif El-Masri	5 February 1990 (aged 22)		(Singapore) Courts Young Lions
16	DF	Drew Beckie	30 September 1990 (aged 21)		(United States) University of Denver
17	FW	Carl Haworth	7 September 1989 (aged 22)		(Canada) Montreal Impact
18	GK	Michał Misiewicz	11 October 1990 (aged 21)		(Canada) FC Edmonton
19	FW	Randy Edwini-Bonsu	20 April 1990 (aged 21)		(Germany) Eintracht Braunschweig
20	MF	Evan James	19 June 1990 (aged 21)		(Canada) Montreal Impact

=== United States ===
Coach: Caleb Porter

No.	Pos.	Player	Date of birth (age)	Caps	Club
1	GK	Bill Hamid	25 November 1990 (aged 21)		(United States) D.C. United
2	DF	Ike Opara	21 February 1989 (aged 23)		(United States) San Jose Earthquakes
3	DF	Kofi Sarkodie	22 March 1991 (aged 21)		(United States) Houston Dynamo
4	DF	Perry Kitchen	29 February 1992 (aged 20)		(United States) D.C. United
5	DF	Zarek Valentin	6 August 1991 (aged 20)		(Canada) Montreal Impact
6	MF	Jared Jeffrey	14 June 1990 (aged 21)		(Germany) FSV Mainz 05
7	MF	Freddy Adu (c)	2 June 1989 (aged 22)		(United States) Philadelphia Union
8	MF	Mix Diskerud	2 October 1990 (aged 21)		(Belgium) Gent
9	FW	Juan Agudelo	23 November 1992 (aged 19)		(United States) New York Red Bulls
10	MF	Joe Corona	9 July 1990 (aged 21)		(Mexico) Tijuana
11	FW	Brek Shea	28 February 1990 (aged 22)		(United States) FC Dallas
12	FW	Teal Bunbury	27 February 1990 (aged 22)		(United States) Sporting Kansas City
13	DF	Jorge Villafaña	16 September 1989 (aged 22)		(United States) Chivas USA
14	FW	Joe Gyau	16 September 1992 (aged 19)		(Germany) 1899 Hoffenheim
15	FW	Terrence Boyd	16 February 1991 (aged 21)		(Germany) Borussia Dortmund
16	MF	Amobi Okugo	13 March 1991 (aged 21)		(United States) Philadelphia Union
17	FW	Tony Taylor	13 July 1989 (aged 22)		(Portugal) Estoril
18	GK	Sean Johnson	31 May 1989 (aged 22)		(United States) Chicago Fire
19	DF	Sheanon Williams	17 March 1990 (aged 22)		(United States) Philadelphia Union
20	MF	Michael Stephens	3 April 1989 (aged 22)		(United States) Los Angeles Galaxy

=== Cuba ===
Coach: Raúl González Triana

No.	Pos.	Player	Date of birth (age)	Caps	Club
1	GK	Odisnel Cooper	31 March 1992 (aged 19)		(Cuba) Camagüey
2	DF	Yoisel Salazar	7 January 1989 (aged 23)		(Cuba) Camagüey
3	DF	Yosmel De Armas	16 August 1989 (aged 22)		(Cuba) Ciudad de La Habana
4	DF	José Macías	10 May 1991 (aged 20)		(Cuba) Villa Clara
5	DF	Renay Malblanche	8 August 1991 (aged 20)		(Cuba) Holguín
6	MF	Osay Martínez	19 May 1991 (aged 20)		(Cuba) Industriales
7	MF	Ricardo Peña	21 December 1992 (aged 19)		(Cuba) La Habana
8	MF	Jorge Fariñas	9 December 1990 (aged 21)		(Cuba) Ciudad de La Habana
9	DF	Félix Guerra	14 January 1989 (aged 23)		(Cuba) Granma
10	MF	Maikel Chang	18 April 1991 (aged 20)		(Cuba) Ciudad de La Habana
11	FW	Daniel Sáez	11 May 1994 (aged 17)		(Cuba) La Habana
12	GK	Julio Pichardo	10 January 1990 (aged 22)		(Cuba) Las Tunas
13	MF	Carlos Francisco (c)	22 May 1990 (aged 21)		Santiago de Cuba
14	FW	Arichel Hernández	20 September 1993 (aged 18)		(Cuba) Villa Clara
15	DF	Adrián Diz	4 March 1994 (aged 18)		(Cuba) La Habana
16	MF	Heviel Cordoves	10 November 1989 (aged 22)		(Cuba) Ciudad de La Habana
17	MF	Dairon Blanco	2 October 1992 (aged 19)		(Cuba) Las Tunas
18	FW	Maykel Reyes	4 March 1993 (aged 19)		(Cuba) FC Pinar del Rio

== Group B ==
=== Honduras ===
Coach: (Colombia) Luis Fernando Suárez

No.	Pos.	Player	Date of birth (age)	Caps	Club
1	GK	José Mendoza	21 July 1989 (aged 22)		(Honduras) Platense
2	DF	Wilmer Crisanto	24 June 1989 (aged 22)		(Honduras) Victoria
3	DF	José Velásquez	8 December 1989 (aged 22)		(Honduras) Victoria
4	DF	Hilder Colón	6 April 1989 (aged 22)		(Honduras) Real España
5	DF	Ever Alvarado	30 January 1992 (aged 20)		(Honduras) Real España
6	MF	Arnold Peralta	29 March 1989 (aged 22)		(Honduras) Vida
7	MF	Mario Martínez	30 July 1989 (aged 22)		(Honduras) Real España
8	MF	Wilmer Fuentes	21 April 1992 (aged 19)		(Honduras) Marathón
9	FW	Anthony Lozano	25 April 1993 (aged 18)		(Spain) Alcoyano
10	MF	Alexander López	5 June 1992 (aged 19)		(Honduras) Olimpia
11	FW	Roger Rojas	9 June 1990 (aged 21)		(Honduras) Olimpia
12	MF	Gerson Rodas	6 July 1990 (aged 21)		(Honduras) Real España
13	FW	Eddie Hernández	27 February 1991 (aged 21)		(Sweden) Häcken
14	MF	Andy Najar	16 March 1993 (aged 19)		(United States) D.C. United
15	DF	Orlin Peralta	12 February 1990 (aged 22)		(Honduras) Vida
16	DF	Johnny Leverón (c)	7 February 1990 (aged 22)		(Honduras) Motagua
17	FW	Romell Quioto	9 August 1991 (aged 20)		(Honduras) Vida
18	GK	Francisco Reyes	7 February 1990 (aged 22)		(Honduras) Olimpia
19	MF	Luis Garrido	5 November 1990 (aged 21)		(Honduras) Olimpia
20	MF	Alfredo Mejía	3 April 1990 (aged 21)		(Honduras) Motagua

=== Panama ===
Coach: Julio Dely Valdés

No.	Pos.	Player	Date of birth (age)	Caps	Club
1	GK	Luis Mejía (c)	16 March 1991 (aged 21)		(Uruguay) Fénix
2	DF	Rolando Algandona	12 April 1989 (aged 22)		(Panama) San Francisco
3	DF	Harold Cummings	1 March 1992 (aged 20)		(Uruguay) River Plate
4	DF	Carlos Rodríguez	12 April 1990 (aged 21)		(United States) FC Dallas
5	DF	Sergio Thompson	10 August 1989 (aged 22)		(Panama) Sporting San Miguelito
6	MF	Roderick Paúl	26 August 1989 (aged 22)		(Panama) Árabe Unido
7	FW	Amir Waithe	27 November 1989 (aged 22)		(Panama) San Francisco
8	MF	Juan de Gracia	21 April 1990 (aged 21)		(Panama) Chepo
9	FW	Víctor Barrera	20 July 1991 (aged 20)		(El Salvador) Titán
10	MF	Marcos Sánchez	23 December 1989 (aged 22)		(Panama) Tauro
11	MF	Erick Davis	31 March 1991 (aged 20)		(Uruguay) Fénix
12	GK	Alex Rodríguez	5 August 1990 (aged 21)		(Panama) Sporting San Miguelito
13	DF	Roderick Miller	3 April 1992 (aged 19)		(Panama) San Francisco
14	DF	Edward Benítez	15 October 1991 (aged 20)		(Panama) Sporting San Miguelito
15	MF	Javier Cedeño	21 October 1989 (aged 22)		(Panama) Alianza
16	DF	Alberto Quezada	7 November 1990 (aged 21)		(Panama) Chepo
17	FW	Yairo Glaize	7 September 1989 (aged 22)		(Panama) Sporting San Miguelito
18	MF	Manuel Asprilla	15 March 1991 (aged 21)		(Mexico) UANL
19	FW	Cecilio Waterman	13 April 1991 (aged 20)		(Uruguay) Fénix
20	MF	Aníbal Godoy	10 February 1990 (aged 22)		(Argentina) Godoy Cruz

=== Trinidad and Tobago ===
Coach: Angus Eve

No.	Pos.	Player	Date of birth (age)	Caps	Club
1	GK	Andre Marchan	11 August 1990 (aged 21)		(Trinidad and Tobago) North East Stars
2	DF	Kareem Moses	11 February 1990 (aged 22)		(Trinidad and Tobago) St. Ann's Rangers
3	DF	Joevin Jones	3 August 1991 (aged 20)		(Trinidad and Tobago) W Connection
4	DF	Sheldon Bateau (c)	29 January 1991 (aged 21)		(Trinidad and Tobago) San Juan Jabloteh
5	MF	Kevan George	30 January 1990 (aged 22)		(United States) Columbus Crew
6	DF	Leslie Russell	21 August 1989 (aged 22)		(Trinidad and Tobago) W Connection
7	MF	Sean de Silva	17 January 1990 (aged 22)		(United States) College of Charleston
8	MF	Jeromie Williams	17 May 1989 (aged 22)		(Trinidad and Tobago) North East Stars
9	FW	Jamal Gay	9 February 1989 (aged 23)		(Trinidad and Tobago) Caledonia AIA
10	MF	Kevin Molino	17 June 1990 (aged 21)		(United States) Orlando City
11	FW	Shahdon Winchester	8 January 1992 (aged 20)		(Trinidad and Tobago) W Connection
12	MF	Jayson Joseph	7 January 1989 (aged 23)		(Trinidad and Tobago) T&TEC
13	MF	Jomal Williams	28 April 1994 (aged 17)		(Trinidad and Tobago) W Connection
14	FW	Trevin Caesar	26 April 1989 (aged 22)		(Trinidad and Tobago) Caledonia AIA
15	DF	Curtis Gonzales	26 January 1989 (aged 23)		(Trinidad and Tobago) Defence Force
16	FW	Cordell Cato	15 July 1992 (aged 19)		(United States) Seattle Sounders FC
17	DF	Mekeil Williams	24 July 1990 (aged 21)		(Poland) Pogoń Szczecin
18	MF	Micah Lewis	20 March 1990 (aged 22)		(Trinidad and Tobago) Caledonia AIA
19	DF	Daneil Cyrus	15 December 1990 (aged 21)		(Trinidad and Tobago) Santa Rosa
20	GK	Sheldon Clarke	14 December 1990 (aged 21)		(Trinidad and Tobago) Defence Force

=== Mexico ===
Coach: Luis Fernando Tena

No.	Pos.	Player	Date of birth (age)	Caps	Club
1	GK	Liborio Sánchez	9 October 1989 (aged 22)	11	(Mexico) Querétaro
2	DF	Israel Jiménez	13 August 1989 (aged 22)	14	(Mexico) UANL
3	DF	Hiram Mier (c)	25 August 1989 (aged 22)	26	(Mexico) Monterrey
4	DF	Néstor Araujo	29 August 1991 (aged 20)	18	(Mexico) Cruz Azul
5	DF	Dárvin Chávez	21 November 1989 (aged 22)	31	(Mexico) Monterrey
6	MF	Héctor Herrera	19 April 1990 (aged 21)	16	(Mexico) Pachuca
7	MF	Javier Cortés	20 July 1989 (aged 22)	16	(Mexico) UNAM
8	MF	David Cabrera	7 September 1989 (aged 22)	6	(Mexico) UNAM
9	FW	Jerónimo Amione	31 March 1990 (aged 21)	11	(Mexico) Atlante
10	MF	Marco Fabián	21 July 1989 (aged 22)	20	(Mexico) Guadalajara
11	MF	Javier Aquino	6 July 1990 (aged 21)	31	(Mexico) Cruz Azul
12	GK	José Antonio Rodríguez	4 July 1992 (aged 19)	7	(Mexico) Veracruz
13	DF	Diego Reyes	19 September 1992 (aged 19)	12	(Mexico) América
14	MF	Jorge Enríquez	8 January 1991 (aged 21)	32	(Mexico) Guadalajara
15	FW	Erick Torres	19 January 1993 (aged 19)	9	(Mexico) Guadalajara
16	DF	Miguel Ponce	12 April 1989 (aged 22)	22	(Mexico) Guadalajara
17	MF	Néstor Calderón	14 February 1989 (aged 23)	8	(Mexico) Toluca
18	DF	Hugo Rodríguez	8 June 1990 (aged 21)	10	(Mexico) Atlas
19	FW	Alan Pulido	8 March 1991 (aged 21)	12	(Mexico) UANL
20	GK	Hugo González	1 August 1990 (aged 21)	1	(Mexico) América
