= 2012 CONCACAF Men's Olympic Qualifying Championship qualification =

There will be a qualification held to determine the two qualifiers from the Caribbean and three from Central America who will join Canada, Mexico and the United States at the final tournament.

== Tiebreakers ==
Per FIFA regulations the group tiebreakers for all qualifying tournaments will be:

- goal difference in all group matches
- greatest number of goals scored in all group matches
- If two or more teams are equal on the basis of the above criteria, their rankings shall be determined as follows:
  - greater number of points obtained in all group matches between the teams concerned
  - goal difference resulting from the group matches between the teams concerned
  - greater number of goals scored in all group matches between the teams concerned
  - play-off match on neutral ground (with extra time and penalty kicks, if necessary)

== Caribbean ==
On 17 May 2011 CONCACAF announced the groups for the Caribbean qualifying. The group winners will advance to the second round, where two of them will qualify for the final qualifying tournament.

=== First round ===
==== Group A ====
Suriname was host for Group A.

Team	Pld	W	D	L	GF	GA	GD	Pts
Suriname	3	2	1	0	10	3	+7	7
Jamaica	3	2	1	0	5	2	+3	7
Saint Vincent and the Grenadines	3	1	0	2	3	5	−2	3
Cayman Islands	3	0	0	3	0	8	−8	0

3 August 2011
16:00 UTC−03:00

Saint Vincent and the Grenadines	0 – 2	Jamaica
	Report	Parkes 52'; Williams 69'

André Kamperveen Stadion, Paramaribo
Attendance: 450
Referee: Mark Young (Guyana)
3 August 2011
18:00 UTC−03:00

Suriname	5 – 0	Cayman Islands
Perk 15'; Rijssel 20', 46'; Hernandez 34' (o.g.); Drenthe 89'	Report

André Kamperveen Stadion, Paramaribo
Attendance: 600
Referee: Trevor Taylor (Barbados)

5 August 2011
16:00 UTC−03:00

Jamaica	1 – 0	Cayman Islands
Adlam 14'	Report

André Kamperveen Stadion, Paramaribo
Attendance: 200
Referee: Bryan Willett (Antigua and Barbuda)
5 August 2011
18:00 UTC−03:00

Suriname	3 – 1	Saint Vincent and the Grenadines
Drenthe 3', 24'; Waal 36'	Report	Cuffy 19'

André Kamperveen Stadion, Paramaribo
Attendance: 600
Referee: Valman Bedeau (Grenada)

7 August 2011
15:00 UTC−03:00

Cayman Islands	0 – 2	Saint Vincent and the Grenadines
	Report	Stapleton 25'; Ebanks 29' (o.g.)

André Kamperveen Stadion, Paramaribo
Attendance: 350
Referee: Valman Bedeau (Grenada)
7 August 2011
17:00 UTC−03:00

Suriname	2 – 2	Jamaica
Simpson 57' (o.g.); Mando 90' (pen.)	Report	Malcolm 63'; Bernal 65'

André Kamperveen Stadion, Paramaribo
Attendance: 1,600
Referee: Stanley Lancaster (Guyana)
- The Jamaica-Suriname match was abandoned in injury time with the score at 2–2 due to a pitch invasion and a brawl in which the Jamaican coach and players attacked officials and police; the result stands.

==== Group B ====
Dominica was host for Group B.

Team	Pld	W	D	L	GF	GA	GD	Pts
Trinidad and Tobago	3	2	1	0	6	1	+5	7
Curaçao	3	2	1	0	5	1	+4	7
Grenada	3	1	0	2	2	3	−1	3
Dominica	3	0	0	3	0	8	−8	0

19 July 2011
17:00 UTC−05:00

Trinidad and Tobago	1 – 0	Grenada
Joseph 23'	Report

Windsor Park, Roseau
Attendance: 3,000
Referee: Kevin Morrison (Jamaica)
19 July 2011
19:00 UTC−05:00

Dominica	0 – 2	Curaçao
	Report	Colina 86', 90'

Windsor Park, Roseau
Attendance: 1,300
Referee: James Matthew (Saint Kitts and Nevis)

21 July 2011
17:00 UTC−05:00

Curaçao	1 – 1	Trinidad and Tobago
Martina 70'	Report	Joseph 58'

Windsor Park, Roseau
Referee: James Matthew (Saint Kitts and Nevis)
21 July 2011
19:00 UTC−05:00

Dominica	0 – 2	Grenada
	Report	Charles 48'; Phillip 87'

Windsor Park, Roseau
Attendance: 3,000
Referee: Valdrin Ledgister (Jamaica)

23 July 2011
17:00 UTC−05:00

Grenada	0 – 2	Curaçao
	Report	Carmelia 53', 55'

Windsor Park, Roseau
Referee: Valdrin Ledgister (Jamaica)
23 July 2011
19:00 UTC−05:00

Dominica	0 – 4	Trinidad and Tobago
	Report	Roget 34'; Caesar 76', 83'; Joseph 80'

Windsor Park, Roseau
Attendance: 4,500
Referee: Kevin Morrison (Jamaica)

==== Group C ====
Cuba was host for Group C.

Team	Pld	W	D	L	GF	GA	GD	Pts
Cuba	2	2	0	0	8	0	+8	6
Aruba	2	1	0	1	1	7	−6	3
Guyana	2	0	0	2	0	2	−2	0

23 June 2011
17:00 UTC−04:00

Guyana	0 – 1	Aruba
	Report	Kock 78'

Estadio Pedro Marrero, Havana
Attendance: 100
Referee: Alain Georges (Haiti)

25 June 2011
17:00 UTC−04:00

Cuba	7 – 0	Aruba
Cordoves 1', 24'; Hernández 9', 55'; García 45'; Lahera 78'; Aira 83'	Report

Estadio Pedro Marrero, Havana
Attendance: 200
Referee: Adrian Skeete (Barbados)

27 June 2011
17:00 UTC−04:00

Cuba	1 – 0	Guyana
Cordoves 62'	Report

Estadio Pedro Marrero, Havana
Attendance: 300
Referee: Canaan St. Catherine (Saint Lucia)

==== Group D ====
Saint Kitts and Nevis was host for Group D.

Team	Pld	W	D	L	GF	GA	GD	Pts
Saint Kitts and Nevis	3	3	0	0	6	3	+3	9
Haiti	3	2	0	1	5	3	+2	6
Antigua and Barbuda	3	1	0	2	4	5	−1	3
Saint Lucia	3	0	0	3	2	6	−4	0

21 July 2011
18:00 UTC−04:00

Haiti	2 – 1	Antigua and Barbuda
Charles 2'; Guerrier 49'	Report	Smith 26'

Warner Park, Basseterre
Attendance: 650
Referee: Marcos Brea (Cuba)
21 July 2011
20:00 UTC−04:00

Saint Kitts and Nevis	2 – 1	Saint Lucia
Somersall 39'; Warde 73'	Report	Pierre 90'

Warner Park, Basseterre
Attendance: 850
Referee: Neal Brizan (Trinidad and Tobago)

23 July 2011
09:00 UTC−04:00

Saint Lucia	0 – 2	Haiti
	Report	Norde 7'; Charles 36'

Warner Park, Basseterre
Attendance: 650
Referee: Kevin Thomas (Jamaica)
23 July 2011
09:00 UTC−04:00

Saint Kitts and Nevis	2 – 1	Antigua and Barbuda
Elliott 51'; Somersall 58'	Report	Smith 2'

Warner Park, Basseterre
Attendance: 700
Referee: Neal Brizan (Trinidad and Tobago)

25 July 2011
09:00 UTC−04:00

Antigua and Barbuda	2 – 1	Saint Lucia
Gregory 25'; Thomas 81'	Report	Paul 67'

Warner Park, Basseterre
Attendance: 250
Referee: Junior Andujar (Dominican Republic)
25 July 2011
20:00 UTC−04:00

Saint Kitts and Nevis	2 – 1	Haiti
Joseph 59' (o.g.); Elliott 88'	Report	Gerald 37'

Warner Park, Basseterre
Attendance: 1,200
Referee: Neal Brizan (Trinidad and Tobago)

=== Second round ===
St Kitts and Nevis was host for the Second Round.

Team	Pld	W	D	L	GF	GA	GD	Pts
Cuba	3	1	2	0	6	4	+2	5
Trinidad and Tobago	3	1	1	1	12	7	+5	4
Saint Kitts and Nevis	3	1	1	1	6	4	+2	4
Suriname	3	1	0	2	4	13	–9	3

24 November 2011
18:00 UTC−04:00

Trinidad and Tobago	1 – 1	Cuba
Gay 24'	Report	García 22'

Warner Park, Basseterre
Attendance: 1000
Referee: Stanley Lancaster (Guyana)
24 November 2011
20:00 UTC−04:00

Saint Kitts and Nevis	0 – 1	Suriname
	Report	Waal 59'

Warner Park, Basseterre
Attendance: 1000
Referee: Valdrin Ledgister (Jamaica)

26 November 2011
18:00 UTC−04:00

Cuba	4 – 2	Suriname
Cordovés 58', 90'; Aira 62'; Chang 79'	Report	Loswijk 17'; Esperance 45'

Warner Park, Basseterre
Attendance: 600
Referee: Javier Santos (Puerto Rico)
26 November 2011
20:00 UTC−04:00

Saint Kitts and Nevis	5 – 2	Trinidad and Tobago
Blanchette 17', 68'; Sawyers 48', 65', 88'	Report	Winchester 26' de Silva 83'

Warner Park, Basseterre
Attendance: 900
Referee: Rudolph Angela (Aruba)

28 November 2011
18:00 UTC−04:00

Suriname	1 – 9	Trinidad and Tobago
Mando 86'	Report	Molino 15', 18', 32', 63'; Lewis 28', 77'; Gay 50', 71' de Silva 69'

Warner Park, Basseterre
Attendance: 1200
Referee: Bryan Willett (Antigua and Barbuda)
28 November 2011
20:00 UTC−04:00

Saint Kitts and Nevis	1 – 1	Cuba
Sawyers 38'	Report	Aira 72'

Warner Park, Basseterre
Attendance: 1400
Referee: Valdrin Ledgister (Jamaica)

== Central America ==
On 3 May 2011, the UNCAF announced the two groups that will fight for three spots for the 2012 CONCACAF Men's Pre-Olympic Tournament.

=== Group 1 ===
Played from 13–17 September 2011 in El Salvador.

Team	Pld	W	D	L	GF	GA	GD	Pts
El Salvador	2	2	0	0	4	2	+2	6
Panama	2	1	0	1	4	3	+1	3
Guatemala	2	0	0	2	2	5	-3	0

13 September 2011
19:00 (UTC−06:00)
Day 1

El Salvador	2 – 1	Guatemala
Blanco 17', 57'	Report	72' Arriola

Estadio Cuscatlán, San Salvador, El Salvador
Attendance: 6,582
Referee: Franklin Jarquín (Nicaragua)
15 September 2011
15:00 (UTC−06:00)
Day 2

Guatemala	1 – 3	Panama
Valenzuela 66'	Report	Blackburn 26'; Polo 28'; Davis 77'

Estadio Cuscatlán, San Salvador, El Salvador
Attendance: 78
Referee: Érick Andino (Honduras)
17 September 2011
15:00 (UTC−06:00)
Day 3

El Salvador	2 – 1	Panama
García 8'; Rivas 46'	Report	Godoy 90+3'

Estadio Cuscatlán, San Salvador, El Salvador
Attendance: 3,738
Referee: Jeffrey Solís (Costa Rica)

=== Group 2 ===
Played from 21–25 September 2011 in Honduras.

Team	Pld	W	D	L	GF	GA	GD	Pts
Honduras	2	1	1	0	7	2	+5	4
Costa Rica	2	1	1	0	6	2	+4	4
Nicaragua	2	0	0	2	0	9	-9	0

21 September 2011
21:00 (UTC−06:00)
Day 1

Costa Rica	4 – 0	Nicaragua
Martínez 25', 61'; Madrigal 35'; Brenes 50'	Report

Estadio Francisco Morazán, San Pedro Sula, Honduras
Attendance: 123
Referee: Óscar Reyna (Guatemala)
23 September 2011
21:00 (UTC−06:00)
Day 2

Honduras	2 – 2	Costa Rica
Rojas 28'; Hernández 85'	Report	Martínez 51'; Estrada 83'

Estadio Francisco Morazán, San Pedro Sula, Honduras
Attendance: 2,900
Referee: Jafeth Perea (Panama)
25 September 2011
21:00 (UTC−06:00)
Day 3

Honduras	5 – 0	Nicaragua
Leverón 12'; Altamirano 36'; Rojas 51', 75'; Martinez 71'	Report

Estadio Francisco Morazán, San Pedro Sula, Honduras
Attendance: 4,354
Referee: Edenilson Ventura (El Salvador)

=== Playoff ===
26 October 2011
21:00 (UTC−05:00)
1st leg

Panama	2 – 1	Costa Rica
Godoy 62'; Blackburn 72'	Report	Guzmán 67'

Estadio Rommel Fernández, Panama City, Panama
Attendance: 1,730
Referee: Mark Geiger (USA)
3 November 2011
22:00 (UTC−06:00)
2nd leg

Costa Rica	1 – 1	Panama
Duarte 86' (pen.)	Report	Blackburn 72'

Estadio Alejandro Morera Soto, Alajuela, Costa Rica
Attendance: 6,400
Referee: Joel Aguilar (SLV)
- Panama won 3–2 on aggregate.
