= Sendley Bito =

Curacaoan footballer

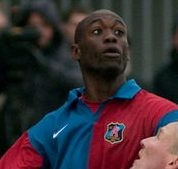

Personal information
- Full name: Sendley Sidney Bito
- Date of birth: 20 July 1983 (age 43)
- Place of birth: Willemstad, Curaçao, Netherlands Antilles
- Height: 1.86 m (6 ft 1 in)
- Position: Striker

Team information
- Current team: Prachuap Khiri Khan
- Number: 10

Youth career
- 2002–2005: Sparta Rotterdam

Senior career*
Years	Team	Apps	(Gls)
2005–2006	Sparta Rotterdam	19	(6)
2006–2007	Stal Alchevsk	23	(3)
2007–2013	Arsenal Kyiv	37	(2)
2009	→ Valletta (loan)	10	(2)
2009	→ Zakarpattia Uzhhorod (loan)	5	(0)
2010–2011	→ Tavriya Simferopol (loan)	2	(0)
2013–2014	Fajr Sepasi	9	(1)
2014	Manama Club	23	(9)
2015	Zakho FC	15	(6)
2015–2016	Prachuap Khiri Khan	8	(4)
2016–2017	OFC		
2017	Hubentut Fortuna		
2017–	Victory Boys		

International career^{‡}
2008	Netherlands Antilles	4	(0)
2011–	Curaçao	8	(2)
- * Club domestic league appearances and goals as of 5 April 2013 ‡ National team caps and goals as of 4 August 2018

Sendley Sidney Bito (born 20 July 1983 in Willemstad) is a Curaçaoan footballer.

After struggling to feature for Sparta Rotterdam's first team, Bito moved abroad for an opportunity to play professional in Ukraine. He made a strong initial impression with FC Stal Alchevsk, earning a move to FC Arsenal Kyiv, but ultimately Bito wasn't part of Arsenal's long-term plans.

== Career statistics ==
=== International ===
Appearances and goals by national team and year
National team	Year	Apps	Goals
Netherlands Antilles	2008	4	0
Netherlands Antilles	Total	4	0
Curaçao	2011	6	3
Curaçao	Total	6	3

Scores and results list Curaçao's goal tally first, score column indicates score after each Bito goal.

List of international goals scored by Sendley Bito
No.	Date	Venue	Opponent	Score	Result	Competition
1	11 October 2011	Stade Sylvio Cator, Port-au-Prince, Haiti	Haiti	2–0	2–2	2014 FIFA World Cup qualification
2	11 November 2011	Paul E. Joseph Stadium, Frederiksted, United States Virgin Islands	U.S. Virgin Islands	3–0	3–0	2014 FIFA World Cup qualification
3	2 December 2011	Dr. Ir. Franklin Essed Stadion, Paramaribo, Suriname	Bonaire	1–0	1–3	2011 ABCS Tournament
