= 2012 CONCACAF Men's Olympic Qualifying Championship =

North American football tournament

CONCACAF MEN'S OLYMPIC QUALIFYING 2012

Tournament details
- Host country: United States
- Dates: 22 March – 2 April
- Teams: 8 (from 1 confederation)
- Venues: 3 (in 3 host cities)

Final positions
- Champions: Mexico (6th title)
- Runners-up: Honduras
- Third place: El Salvador
- Fourth place: Canada

Tournament statistics
- Matches played: 15
- Goals scored: 52 (3.47 per match)
- Attendance: 157,707 (10,514 per match)
- Top scorer(s): (Mexico) Marco Fabián (Mexico) Alan Pulido (5 goals each)

The 2012 CONCACAF Men's Olympic Qualifying Championship was the thirteenth edition of the CONCACAF Men's Olympic Qualifying, the quadrennial, international, age-restricted football tournament organized by CONCACAF to determine which men's under-23 national teams from the North, Central America and Caribbean region qualify for the Olympic football tournament. It was held in the United States, from 22 March and 2 April 2012.

Mexico won the tournament for the sixth time, following a 2–1 victory after extra time over Honduras. As the top two teams, Mexico and Honduras both qualified for the 2012 Summer Olympics in United Kingdom as the CONCACAF representatives.

== Qualification ==
=== Qualified teams ===
The following teams qualified for the final tournament.

Zone	Country	Method of qualification	Appearance^{1}	Last appearance	Previous best performance	Previous Olympic appearances (last)
North America	Canada	Automatic		2008	Runners-up (1984, 1996)	
North America	Mexico	Automatic		2008	Winners (1964, 1972, 1976, 1996, 2004)	
North America	United States (hosts)	Automatic		2008	Winners (1988, 1992)	
Central America	El Salvador	Group 1 winners		1996	Final round winner without outright champions (1968)	
Central America	Honduras (title holders)	Group 1 winners		2008	Winners (2000, 2008)	
Central America	Panama	Play-off winners		2008	Fourth place (1964)	
Caribbean	Cuba	Second round winners		2008	Third place (1976, 1984)	
Caribbean	Trinidad and Tobago	Second round runners-up		2004	Runners-up (1968)	

^{1} Only final tournament.

== Venues ==
Three cities served as the venues for the tournament.

Nashville, Tennessee	Carson, California (Los Angeles Area)	Kansas City, Kansas
LP Field	The Home Depot Center	Livestrong Sporting Park
Capacity: 69,143	Capacity: 27,000	Capacity: 18,467
Location of the host cities of the 2012 CONCACAF Men's Olympic Qualifying Championship.

== Match officials ==
The match officials were announced on 10 February 2012.

Country	Referee
Jamaica	Raymond Bogle
El Salvador	Elmer Bonilla
Costa Rica	Hugo Cruz
Mexico	Roberto García
Guatemala	Walter López
United States	Jair Marrufo
Panama	Jafeth Perea
Honduras	Héctor Rodríguez
Puerto Rico	Javier Santos
Suriname	Enrico Wijngaarde

Country	Assistant Referee
United States	Eric Boria
Canada	Phillipe Briere
Nicaragua	Keytzel Corrales
Honduras	Melvyn Cruz
Guatemala	Juan Lemus
Puerto Rico	Antonio López
Suriname	Ricardo Louisville
Trinidad and Tobago	Dion Neil
Mexico	Juan Rangel Maya
El Salvador	Héctor Recinos

== Group stage ==
All times in Eastern Daylight Time.

=== Group A ===
Team	Pld	W	D	L	GF	GA	GD	Pts
El Salvador	3	1	2	0	7	3	+4	5
Canada	3	1	2	0	3	1	+2	5
United States	3	1	1	1	9	5	+4	4
Cuba	3	0	1	2	1	11	−10	1

22 March 2012
18:30

El Salvador	0–0	Canada
	Report

LP Field, Nashville, Tennessee
Attendance: 4,269
Referee: Walter López (Guatemala)
22 March 2012
21:00

United States	6–0	Cuba
Corona 12', 40', 88'; Agudelo 37'; Diz 43' (o.g.); Adu 62'	Report

LP Field, Nashville, Tennessee
Attendance: 4,269
Referee: Roberto García (Mexico)

24 March 2012
16:30

Cuba	0–4	El Salvador
	Report	Blanco 4'; Flores 52', 80'; Menjivar 68'

LP Field, Nashville, Tennessee
Attendance: 10,578
Referee: Héctor Rodríguez (Honduras)
24 March 2012
19:00

United States	0–2	Canada
	Report	Henry 58'; Cavallini 83'

LP Field, Nashville, Tennessee
Attendance: 10,578
Referee: Jafeth Perea (Panama)

26 March 2012
18:30

Canada	1–1	Cuba
James 25'	Report	Reyes 90'

LP Field, Nashville, Tennessee
Attendance: 7,889
Referee: Hugo Cruz (Costa Rica)
26 March 2012
21:00

United States	3–3	El Salvador
Boyd 1', 64'; Corona 68'	Report	Blanco 35'; Flores 36'; Alas 90+4'

LP Field, Nashville, Tennessee
Attendance: 7,889
Referee: Roberto García (Mexico)

=== Group B ===
Team	Pld	W	D	L	GF	GA	GD	Pts
Mexico	3	3	0	0	11	1	+10	9
Honduras	3	2	0	1	5	4	+1	6
Panama	3	0	1	2	2	5	−3	1
Trinidad and Tobago	3	0	1	2	2	10	−8	1

23 March 2012
21:00

Honduras	3–1	Panama
Hernández 19'; Martínez 47'; López 87'	Report	Yau 54'

The Home Depot Center, Carson, California
Attendance: 8,521
Referee: Jair Marrufo (United States)
23 March 2012
23:30

Trinidad and Tobago	1–7	Mexico
Molino 88'	Report	Pulido 29'; Fabián 33', 69', 85'; Reyes 51'; Jiménez 75'; Cortés 90'

The Home Depot Center, Carson, California
Attendance: 8,521
Referee: Raymond Bogle (Jamaica)

25 March 2012
16:30

Panama	1–1	Trinidad and Tobago
Waterman 69'	Report	Winchester 90+3'

The Home Depot Center, Carson, California
Attendance: 16,184
Referee: Javier Santos (Puerto Rico)
25 March 2012
19:00

Mexico	3–0	Honduras
Pulido 25', 39', 47'	Report

The Home Depot Center, Carson, California
Attendance: 16,184
Referee: Elmer Bonilla (El Salvador)

27 March 2012
21:30

Honduras	2–0	Trinidad and Tobago
Hernández 37'; Lozano 70'	Report

The Home Depot Center, Carson, California
Attendance: 10,061
Referee: Jair Marrufo (United States)
27 March 2012
23:30

Mexico	1–0	Panama
Torres 90+1'	Report

The Home Depot Center, Carson, California
Attendance: 10,061
Referee: Enrico Wijngaarde (Suriname)

== Knockout stage ==
=== Bracket ===
Semi-finals
31 March – Kansas City, KS
El Salvador	2
Honduras (a.e.t.)	3
31 March – Kansas City, KS
Mexico	3
Canada	1

Final
2 April – Kansas City, KS
Honduras	1
Mexico (a.e.t.)	2

=== Semi-finals ===
The semi-final winners qualified for the 2012 Summer Olympics.

31 March 2012
18:00 (EDT)

El Salvador	2–3 (a.e.t.)	Honduras
Molina 77'; Sánchez 106'	Report	Lozano 1'; Rodas 101', 114'

Livestrong Sporting Park, Kansas City, Kansas
Attendance: 16,101
Referee: Jair Marrufo (United States)
31 March 2012
21:00 (EDT)

Mexico	3–1	Canada
Fabián 20'; Pulido 33'; Ponce 59'	Report	Haber 32'

Livestrong Sporting Park, Kansas City, Kansas
Attendance: 16,101
Referee: Jafeth Perea (Panama)

=== Final ===
2 April 2012
20:00 (EDT)

Honduras	1–2 (a.e.t.)	Mexico
Quioto 47'	Report	Fabián 74'; Ponce 116'

Livestrong Sporting Park, Kansas City, Kansas
Attendance: 10,501
Referee: Walter López (Guatemala)

== Statistics ==
=== Goalscorers ===
5 goals

- (Mexico) Marco Fabián
- (Mexico) Alan Pulido

4 goals

- (United States) Joe Corona

3 goals

- (El Salvador) Andrés Flores

2 goals

- (El Salvador) Léster Blanco
- (Honduras) Eddie Hernández
- (Honduras) Anthony Lozano
- (Honduras) Gerson Rodas
- (Mexico) Miguel Ponce
- (United States) Terrence Boyd

1 goal

- (Canada) Lucas Cavallini
- (Canada) Marcus Haber
- (Canada) Doneil Henry
- (Canada) Evan James
- (Cuba) Maykel Reyes
- (El Salvador) Jaime Alas
- (El Salvador) Richard Menjivar
- (El Salvador) Milton Molina
- (El Salvador) Edwin Sánchez
- (Honduras) Alexander López
- (Honduras) Mario Martínez
- (Honduras) Romell Quioto
- (Mexico) Javier Cortés
- (Mexico) Israel Jiménez
- (Mexico) Diego Reyes
- (Mexico) Erick Torres
- (Panama) Yairo Glaize
- (Panama) Cecilio Waterman
- (Trinidad and Tobago) Kevin Molino
- (Trinidad and Tobago) Shahdon Winchester
- (United States) Freddy Adu
- (United States) Juan Agudelo

1 own goal

- (Cuba) Adrián Diz (playing against United States)

=== Final ranking ===
As per statistical convention in football, matches decided in extra time were counted as wins and losses, while matches decided by a penalty shoot-out were counted as draws.

Pos	Team	Pld	W	D	L	GF	GA	GD	Pts	Final result
1st place, gold medalist(s)	Mexico	5	5	0	0	16	3	+13	15	Winners
2nd place, silver medalist(s)	Honduras	5	3	0	2	9	8	+1	9	Runner-ups
3	El Salvador	4	1	2	1	9	6	+3	5	Eliminated in semi-finals
4	Canada	4	1	2	1	4	4	0	5	Eliminated in semi-finals
5	United States (H)	3	1	1	1	9	5	+4	4	Eliminated in group stage
6	Panama	3	0	1	2	2	5	−3	1	Eliminated in group stage
7	Trinidad and Tobago	3	0	1	2	2	10	−8	1	Eliminated in group stage
8	Cuba	3	0	1	2	1	11	−10	1	Eliminated in group stage

Source: CONCACAF
(H) Hosts

== Qualified teams for 2012 Summer Olympics ==
The following two teams from CONCACAF qualified for the 2012 Summer Olympics Men's football tournament.

Team	Qualified on	Previous appearances in Summer Olympics^{2}
Honduras	31 March 2012	2 (2000, 2008)
Mexico	31 March 2012	9 (1928, 1948, 1964, 1968, 1972, 1976, 1992, 1996, 2004)

^{2} Bold indicates champions for that year. Italic indicates hosts for that year.

== See also ==
- Football at the 2012 Summer Olympics – Men's tournament
- 2012 CONCACAF Women's Olympic Qualifying Tournament
