= Justin Cochrane =

Footballer (born 1982)

Personal information
- Full name: Justin Vincent Cochrane
- Date of birth: 26 January 1982 (age 44)
- Place of birth: Hackney, England
- Height: 1.80 m (5 ft 11 in)
- Positions: Centre-back; defensive midfielder

Team information
- Current team: Crystal Palace (first-team coach); England (coach)

Senior career*
Years	Team	Apps	(Gls)
2000–2002	Queens Park Rangers	1	(0)
2002–2003	Hayes	22	(5)
2003–2006	Crewe Alexandra	72	(0)
2006	→ Gillingham (loan)	5	(1)
2006–2007	Rotherham United	31	(1)
2007–2008	Yeovil Town	12	(2)
2008	Millwall	1	(0)
2008–2009	Rushden & Diamonds	4	(0)
2009	Aldershot Town	10	(0)
2009–2010	Hayes & Yeading United	30	(2)
2010–2011	Boreham Wood	9	(0)
2011	Antigua Barracuda	4	(1)
2012–2013	Boreham Wood	8	(0)
Total		209	(12)

International career
2008–2012	Antigua and Barbuda	14	(2)

Managerial career
- 2018–2019: England U15
- 2019–2020: England U16
- 2020–2021: England U17
- * Club domestic league appearances and goals

Justin Vincent Cochrane (born 26 January 1982) is an English professional football coach and former player, who played as a centre-back or defensive midfielder. He is first-team coach at Premier League club Crystal Palace and coach for the England national team. Born in England, he represented Antigua and Barbuda at international level.

== Club career ==
Born to an Antiguan father and a Saint Lucian mother, in Hackney, at the former Mothers' Hospital, Cochrane grew up in Edmonton, North London. Cochrane started his career at the London club Queens Park Rangers as a trainee and played for the youth and reserve teams. He made his first-team debut for the club as a second-half substitute in the final home game of the 2000–01 season versus Stockport County, however he was sent off within minutes of coming on. He was sold to non-League Hayes in the close season but in July 2003 was signed by Crewe Alexandra on a free transfer.

In February 2006, Cochrane was loaned out to Gillingham, in an attempt to get first-team football, and in April 2006 had a trial with Luton Town where he scored a goal in a reserve match. He was released by Crewe at the end of the 2005–06 season, subsequently signing a two-year deal with Rotherham United.

Rotherham released him in June 2007, and after playing for Yeovil Town on a non-contract basis, he signed a short-term deal with them on 31 August 2007. He also had a spell at Millwall in which he made one brief substitute appearance.

Cochrane then had a short trial at Leyton Orient before joining Rushden & Diamonds on 19 December 2008 on non-contract forms, before leaving the following month.

On the February 2009, he signed a contract with Aldershot Town. Gary Waddock, the Aldershot manager and former QPR youth coach, was familiar with Cochrane through his time at QPR.

However, Cochrane was released at the beginning of the 2009–10 season, and went on trial at Conference National club Hayes & Yeading United, playing in their pre-season friendly versus Maidenhead United on 25 July, before signing a contract with them.

He last played for Boreham Wood, for whom he scored his first goal in a FA Trophy match against Eastbourne Borough on 11 December 2010, which ended in a 3–1 defeat for Boreham Wood.

== International career ==
Cochrane played for Antigua and Barbuda in non-FIFA regulated friendlies in June 2008, scoring a goal. He made his debut against Saint Kitts and Nevis in a friendly before playing both legs of Antigua's World Cup qualifiers against Cuba. Cochrane also turned out for Antigua and Barbuda during Second Round of the Caribbean Championships that year.

== Coaching career ==
Cochrane was a youth team coach at Tottenham Hotspur, and on 29 August 2019 he was announced as the new head coach of England U16 having stepped up from the U15 age group. On 24 September 2020, Cochrane was appointed England U17 head coach as well as lead for the Youth Development Phase. Concurrent with his FA role, Cochrane was a temporary assistant coach at AFC Wimbledon in early 2020.

On 8 June 2021, Cochrane was appointed as head of player development and coaching at Manchester United's Academy. In June 2022, he moved on to the role of Head of Coaching at Brentford.

On 26 February 2025, it was announced that Cochrane had joined Thomas Tuchel's coaching staff with England alongside his role with Brentford.

On 12 June 2025, it was announced that Cochrane had joined Tottenham Hotspur as first team assistant coach, following the appointment of head coach Thomas Frank. On 16 February 2026, it was reported that Cochrane had left his position upon the appointment of Igor Tudor as interim boss.

On 19 November 2026, Cochrane became first-team coach at Crystal Palace to work again under Thomas Frank who was appointed manager there three days before.

== Career statistics ==
Scores and results list Antigua and Barbuda's goal tally first.

Goal	Date	Venue	Opponent	Score	Result	Competition
1.	10 November 2010	Antigua Recreation Ground, St. John's, Antigua and Barbuda	Suriname	2–1	2–1	2010 Caribbean Cup qualification
2.	6 September 2011	Paul E. Joseph Stadium, Frederiksted, United States Virgin Islands	U.S. Virgin Islands	3–0	8–1	2014 FIFA World Cup qualification
