= Devaughn Elliott =

Kittian footballer (born 1991)

Personal information
- Full name: Devaughn Omari Elliott
- Date of birth: 28 October 1991 (age 35)
- Place of birth: Saint Kitts and Nevis
- Height: 1.75 m (5 ft 9 in)
- Position: Second striker

Team information
- Current team: Village Superstars

Youth career
- 2008–2009: Washington Archibald HS

Senior career*
| Years | Team | Apps | (Gls) |
| 2009–2010 | Positive Vibes | | |
| 2010–2013 | Village Superstars | | |
| 2013–2015 | W Connection | | |
| 2015 | Pasaquina | 23 | (8) |
| 2016 | Murciélagos | 7 | (0) |
| 2016 | Murciélagos B | 15 | (5) |
| 2017 | Pittsburgh Riverhounds | 0 | (0) |
| 2017 | Antigua | 21 | (2) |
| 2017–2018 | Pasaquina | 8 | (0) |
| 2018– | Village Superstars | | |

International career^{‡}
- Saint Kitts and Nevis U17
- Saint Kitts and Nevis U20
| 2011 | Saint Kitts and Nevis U23 | | |
| 2009–2019 | Saint Kitts and Nevis | 36 | (5) |
- * Club domestic league appearances and goals ‡ National team caps and goals as of 13 October 2019

Devaughn Omari Elliott (born 28 October 1991) is a Kittian professional footballer.

He recorded his first goal in international play during the qualifying campaign for 2014 FIFA World Cup.

== Club career ==
=== Village Superstars ===
Devaughn Elliott started his career in the Saint Kitts Premier Division at a young age playing for Village Superstars FC.

=== W Connection ===
In 2013, Elliott signed with W Connection in the TT Pro League.

=== Pasaquina ===
In June 2015, after being spotted during the 2018 FIFA World Cup qualification playing vs El Salvador, Elliott signed a 1-year contract with Salvadoran Primera División club, Pasaquina.

Elliott debuted with Pasaquina FC on August 1, 2015, playing 90 minutes in a 1–1 home tie vs Sonsonate. He scored his first goal in a 1–1 home tie vs historic contender Águila on August 26, 2015.

=== Murciélagos FC ===
After the Apertura 2015 tournament in El Salvador, Elliott transferred to Murciélagos FC for an undisclosed amount. Pasaquina FC retains a stake on the potential future resale of the player.

Initially, Elliott began playing with Murciélagos B due to the first team having already reached its foreign players quota for the 2015/2016 season. He scored his first goal for Murcielagos B in a 1–0 win against Alacranes de Durango on March 5, 2016.

=== Antigua ===
Elliot signed with Antigua of Guatemala in 2017.

=== Return to Pasaquina ===
Elliot signed again with Pasaquina for the Clausura 2018. His debut on his return was a 0–1 defeat against FAS at the Estadio Óscar Alberto Quiteño.

== International career ==
At the youth level he played in 2007 CONCACAF U17 Tournament qualifiers and 2011 CONCACAF U-20 Championship qualifiers, scoring six goals in their 19–0 win over the British Virgin Islands in the latter competition. He later played in 2012 CONCACAF Men's Pre-Olympic Tournament qualification, where he scored against Antigua and Barbuda and Saint Kitts and Nevis.

Elliott made his senior debut in a friendly against Jamaica on 16 August 2009. In November 2015, the team traveled to Europe for matches against Andorra and Estonia, the nation's first matches in history against European opponents. Elliott scored the only goal in the 1–0 victory over Andorra, becoming the first St. Kitts and Nevis player to score against a European side in the process. The result was also the first away victory for a CFU team over a European side on their home soil.

=== International goals ===
Score and result list Saint Kitts and Nevis's goal tally first.

| # | Date | Venue | Opponent | Score | Result | Competition |
|---|---|---|---|---|---|---|
| 1. | 6 September 2011 | Beausejour Stadium, Gros Islet, Saint Lucia | Saint Lucia | 4–0 | 4–2 | 2014 World Cup qualification |
| 2. | 8 October 2014 | Stade Sylvio Cator, Port-au-Prince, Haiti | Barbados | 1–0 | 2–3 | 2014 Caribbean Cup qualification |
| 3. | 10 May 2015 | Usain Bolt Sports Complex, Cave Hill, Barbados | Barbados | 2–1 | 3–1 | Friendly |
| 4. | 12 November 2015 | Estadi Nacional, Andorra la Vella, Andorra | Andorra | 1–0 | 1–0 | Friendly |
| 5. | 19 November 2016 | Warner Park, Basseterre, Saint Kitts and Nevis | Estonia | 1–0 | 1–1 | Friendly |
Last updated 20 November 2016
