= Johan Cruz =

Dominican footballer

Personal information
- Full name: Johan Alberto Cruz de la Cruz
- Date of birth: October 8, 1987 (age 39)
- Place of birth: La Romana, Dominican Republic
- Position: Defender

Team information
- Current team: Atlético Vega Real

Senior career*
Years	Team	Apps	(Gls)
2010–2012	Deportivo Pantoja		
2012–2013	Bayaguana FC		
2014	Romana FC		
2015	Atlético Pantoja		
2016	Delfines del Este		
2017–	Atlético Vega Real		

International career^{‡}
2010–	Dominican Republic	18	(2)
- * Club domestic league appearances and goals ‡ National team caps and goals as of 11 June 2020

Johan Alberto Cruz de la Cruz (born 8 October 1987) is a Dominican footballer who plays as a defender. He played at the 2014 FIFA World Cup qualifier.
