= Fredy Thompson =

Guatemalan professional footballer (born 1982)

Personal information
- Full name: Fredy Williams Thompson León
- Date of birth: 2 June 1982 (age 44)
- Place of birth: Puerto Barrios, Guatemala
- Height: 1.71 m (5 ft 7 1/2 in)
- Position: Midfielder

Senior career*
Years	Team	Apps	(Gls)
2000–2007	Comunicaciones	90	(7)
2007–2008	Municipal	25	(0)
2008	Orizaba	11	(0)
2008–2011	Comunicaciones	47	(4)
2014	Coatepeque	21	(2)
2014–2018	Antigua GFC	151	(5)
2019–2021	Comunicaciones	43	(0)

International career
2001–2015	Guatemala	96	(3)
- * Club domestic league appearances and goals as of 12 January 2021

Fredy Williams Thompson León (born 2 June 1982) is a Guatemalan former professional footballer.

== Club career ==
Thompson started his career at Guatemalan giants Comunicaciones where he would stay for 7 years and captain the side. He then joined bitter rivals Municipal in 2007, but he was never accepted by the Rojos 'fans so he decided not to return after only one season. A move to Europe with Inter Milan or Manchester United, or American Major League Soccer had been mentioned for some time, but he joined Mexican side Albinegros in 2008, only to return to the Cremas in June 2008.

Thompson signed for Universidad SC in January 2019.

=== Doping case and suspension ===
In February 2012, Thompson, alongside Comunicaciones teammates Adolfo Machado and Marvin Ceballos, was temporarily suspended from playing by FIFA after a positive test on the banned substance boldenone. A second test done at a laboratory in Canada reconfirmed the positive doping test and he was later suspended for two years, until 24 January 2014.

== International career ==
He made his debut for the Guatemalan national team in a March 2001 friendly match against Trinidad & Tobago and went on to represent Guatemala during the 2006 World Cup qualification and 2010 World Cup qualification rounds. As of January 2010, he had earned 81 caps, scoring no goals.

He has also captained the national side in the absence of Carlos Ruiz.

On September 7, 2010, he scored his second international goal in a 2–0 win against El Salvador.

On November 15, 2011, in a 2014 World Cup qualification match against Grenada, he scored his third goal to give Guatemala a 2–1 lead. The match ended 4–1.
