= Erick Ozuna =

Dominican Republican footballer

Personal information
- Full name: Erick Junior Ozuna López
- Date of birth: October 5, 1990 (age 36)
- Place of birth: La Romana, Dominican Republic
- Height: 1.70 m (5 ft 7 in)
- Position: Forward

Team information
- Current team: Atlántico FC
- Number: 7

Senior career*
Years	Team	Apps	(Gls)
2010-2011	Barcelona Atlético		
2012	Tempête		
2013	Árabe Unido	5	(0)
2013–2014	Romana FC		
2015-2016	Delfines del Este	10+	(5)
2016-2017	Barcelona Atlético		
2018-2029	Universidad O&M	20+	(8)
2020-2021	Atlético Pantoja	13	(2)
2025-	Atlántico FC	4	(0)

International career^{‡}
2008–2019	Dominican Republic	30	(9)
- * Club domestic league appearances and goals as of 15 December 2025 ‡ National team caps and goals as of May 17, 2021

Erick Junior Ozuna López (born October 5, 1990) is a Dominican professional footballer who plays as a forward for Atlántico FC and formerly for the Dominican Republic national team.

== Career statistics ==
=== International goals ===
Scores and results list the Dominican Republic's goal tally first.

No.	Date	Venue	Cap	Opponent	Score	Result	Competition
1.	14 October 2010	Estadio Panamericano, San Cristóbal, Dominican Republic	2	British Virgin Islands	15–0	17–0	2010 Caribbean Cup qualification
2.	14 October 2010	Estadio Panamericano, San Cristóbal, Dominican Republic	2	British Virgin Islands	16–0	17–0	2010 Caribbean Cup qualification
3.	6 September 2011	Estadio Panamericano, San Cristóbal, Dominican Republic	7	Suriname	1–1	1–1	2014 FIFA World Cup qualification
4.	7 October 2011	Estadio Panamericano, San Cristóbal, Dominican Republic	8	El Salvador	1–1	1–2	2014 FIFA World Cup qualification
5.	11 October 2011	André Kamperveen Stadion, Paramaribo, Suriname	9	Suriname	2–0	3–1	2014 FIFA World Cup qualification
6.	11 October 2011	André Kamperveen Stadion, Paramaribo, Suriname	9	Suriname	3–0	3–1	2014 FIFA World Cup qualification
7.	11 November 2011	Estadio Panamericano, San Cristóbal, Dominican Republic	10	Cayman Islands	2–0	4–0	2014 FIFA World Cup qualification
8.	23 September 2012	Kensington Oval, Bridgetown, Barbados	12	Aruba	1–1	2–2	2012 Caribbean Cup qualification
9.	23 September 2012	Kensington Oval, Bridgetown, Barbados	12	Aruba	2–2	2–2	2012 Caribbean Cup qualification
