= 2014 FIFA World Cup qualification – CONCACAF third round =

Qualification round for FIFA soccer tournament

This page provides the summaries of the CONCACAF third round matches for 2014 FIFA World Cup qualification.

== Format ==
The third round saw the teams ranked 1–6 joined by the 6 group winners from the second round. These teams were drawn into three groups of four teams, at the World Cup Preliminary Draw at the Marina da Glória in Rio de Janeiro, Brazil on 30 July 2011.

The matches were played from 8 June to 16 October 2012. The top two teams from each group advanced to the fourth round.

== Seeding ==
The draw for the third round was held before the second round matches were played, so only the six teams with byes to the round were known at the time of the draw. Teams were seeded into three pots, with Pot 1 containing the top 3 seeds, Pot 2 seeds 4 to 6, and Pot 3 the 6 (unknown) group winners from the second round (designated Winner A to Winner F). Each third round group will contain one team from Pot 1, one team from Pot 2 and two teams from Pot 3.

Pot 1	Pot 2	Pot 3
United States; Mexico; Honduras	Jamaica; Costa Rica; Cuba	El Salvador (Group A); Guyana (Group B); Panama (Group C); Canada (Group D); Guatemala (Group E); Antigua and Barbuda (Group F)

Note: The identity of teams in Pot 3 (second round winners) were not known at the time of the draw.

== Groups ==
=== Group A ===
Pos	Team	Pld	W	D	L	GF	GA	GD	Pts	Qualification	United States men's national soccer team	Jamaica national football team	Guatemala national football team	Antigua and Barbuda national football team
1	United States	6	4	1	1	11	6	+5	13	Advance to fourth round	—	1–0	3–1	3–1
2	Jamaica	6	3	1	2	9	6	+3	10	Advance to fourth round	2–1	—	2–1	4–1
3	Guatemala	6	3	1	2	9	8	+1	10		1–1	2–1	—	3–1
4	Antigua and Barbuda	6	0	1	5	4	13	−9	1		1–2	0–0	0–1	—

8 June 2012
19:11 UTC−4

United States	3–1	Antigua and Barbuda
Bocanegra 8'; Dempsey 44' (pen.); Gomez 72'	Report	Byers 65'

Raymond James Stadium, Tampa
Attendance: 23,971
Referee: Hugo Cruz (Costa Rica)
8 June 2012
20:30 UTC−5

Jamaica	2–1	Guatemala
Phillips 40'; Johnson 46'	Report	Pezzarossi 90+2'

Independence Park, Kingston
Attendance: 14,000
Referee: Roberto Moreno (Panama)

12 June 2012
19:00 UTC−4

Antigua and Barbuda	0–0	Jamaica
	Report

Sir Vivian Richards Stadium, North Sound
Attendance: 8,500
Referee: Stanley Lancaster (Guyana)
12 June 2012
20:00 UTC−6

Guatemala	1–1	United States
Pappa 83'	Report	Dempsey 40'

Estadio Mateo Flores, Guatemala City
Attendance: 18,000
Referee: Joel Aguilar (El Salvador)

7 September 2012
19:00 UTC−5

Jamaica	2–1	United States
Austin 23'; Shelton 62'	Report	Dempsey 1'

Independence Park, Kingston
Attendance: 25,000
Referee: Marco Rodríguez (Mexico)
7 September 2012
20:00 UTC−6

Guatemala	3–1	Antigua and Barbuda
C. Ruiz 60', 79'; Pezzarossi 90+1'	Report	Byers 39'

Estadio Mateo Flores, Guatemala City
Attendance: 8,000
Referee: Marcos Brea (Cuba)

11 September 2012
19:00 UTC−4

Antigua and Barbuda	0–1	Guatemala
	Report	C. Ruiz 26'

Sir Vivian Richards Stadium, North Sound
Attendance: 5,000
Referee: David Gantar (Canada)
11 September 2012
20:11 UTC−4

United States	1–0	Jamaica
Gomez 55'	Report

Columbus Crew Stadium, Columbus
Attendance: 23,881
Referee: José Pineda (Honduras)

12 October 2012
19:00 UTC−4

Antigua and Barbuda	1–2	United States
Blackstock 25'	Report	E. Johnson 20', 90'

Sir Vivian Richards Stadium, North Sound
Attendance: 7,000
Referee: Neal Brizan (Trinidad and Tobago)
12 October 2012
20:00 UTC−6

Guatemala	2–1	Jamaica
Figueroa 15'; C. Ruiz 85'	Report	Shelton 60' (pen.)

Estadio Mateo Flores, Guatemala City
Attendance: 20,717
Referee: Roberto García (Mexico)

16 October 2012
18:15 UTC−5

Jamaica	4–1	Antigua and Barbuda
Phillips 16'; Nosworthy 18'; Richards 77', 88'	Report	Griffith 61'

Independence Park, Kingston
Attendance: 8,000
Referee: Wálter Quesada (Costa Rica)
16 October 2012
18:15 UTC−5

United States	3–1	Guatemala
Bocanegra 10'; Dempsey 18', 36'	Report	C. Ruiz 5'

Livestrong Sporting Park, Kansas City
Attendance: 16,947
Referee: Roberto Moreno (Panama)

=== Group B ===
Pos	Team	Pld	W	D	L	GF	GA	GD	Pts	Qualification	Mexico national football team	Costa Rica national football team	El Salvador national football team	Guyana national football team
1	Mexico	6	6	0	0	15	2	+13	18	Advance to fourth round	—	1–0	2–0	3–1
2	Costa Rica	6	3	1	2	14	5	+9	10	Advance to fourth round	0–2	—	2–2	7–0
3	El Salvador	6	1	2	3	8	11	−3	5		1–2	0–1	—	2–2
4	Guyana	6	0	1	5	5	24	−19	1		0–5	0–4	2–3	—

8 June 2012
19:00 UTC−5

Mexico	3–1	Guyana
Salcido 10'; Dos Santos 15'; Rodrigues 51' (o.g.)	Report	Moreno 62' (o.g.)

Estadio Azteca, Mexico City
Attendance: 80,401
Referee: Javier Santos (Puerto Rico)
8 June 2012
20:30 UTC−6

Costa Rica	2–2	El Salvador
Saborío 10'; Campbell 15'	Report	Gutiérrez 23'; Romero 53'

Estadio Nacional de Costa Rica, San José
Attendance: 23,701
Referee: Walter López (Guatemala)

12 June 2012
20:00 UTC−4

Guyana	0–4	Costa Rica
	Report	Saborío 20', 26', 52'; Campbell 72'

Providence Stadium, Providence
Attendance: 11,000
Referee: Marcos Brea (Cuba)
12 June 2012
19:33 UTC−6

El Salvador	1–2	Mexico
Pacheco 64'	Report	Zavala 60'; Moreno 82'

Estadio Cuscatlán, San Salvador
Attendance: 29,712
Referee: José Pineda (Honduras)

7 September 2012
19:30 UTC−6

El Salvador	2–2	Guyana
Gutiérrez 3'; Romero 28'	Report	Bobb 16', 53'

Estadio Cuscatlán, San Salvador
Attendance: 24,000
Referee: Jair Marrufo (United States)
7 September 2012
20:05 UTC−6

Costa Rica	0–2	Mexico
	Report	Salcido 44'; Zavala 52'

Estadio Nacional de Costa Rica, San José
Attendance: 32,500
Referee: Roberto Moreno (Panama)

11 September 2012
20:00 UTC−4

Guyana	2–3	El Salvador
Richardson 1'; Nurse 62'	Report	Romero 13'; Alas 51'; Burgos 77'

Providence Stadium, Providence
Attendance: 4,141
Referee: Raymond Bogle (Jamaica)
11 September 2012
20:00 UTC−5

Mexico	1–0	Costa Rica
J. Hernández 61'	Report

Estadio Azteca, Mexico City
Attendance: 44,007
Referee: Courtney Campbell (Jamaica)

12 October 2012
20:00 UTC−5

Guyana	0–5	Mexico
	Report	Guardado 78'; Peralta 79'; Pollard 82' (o.g.); J. Hernández 84'; Reyna 86'

BBVA Compass Stadium, Houston (United States) (Note: Guyana played its home World Cup qualifier against Mexico at BBVA Compass Stadium, Houston, citing a conflict with the originally announced venue of Providence Stadium, Providence.)
Attendance: 12,115
Referee: Walter López (Guatemala)
12 October 2012
19:30 UTC−6

El Salvador	0–1	Costa Rica
	Report	Cubero 31'

Estadio Cuscatlán, San Salvador
Attendance: 35,082
Referee: Mark Geiger (United States)

16 October 2012
19:00 UTC−6

Costa Rica	7–0	Guyana
Brenes 10', 48'; Gamboa 14'; Saborío 51' (pen.), 77'; Bolaños 61'; Borges 70'	Report

Estadio Nacional de Costa Rica, San José
Attendance: 27,500
Referee: Héctor Rodríguez (Honduras)
16 October 2012
20:00 UTC−5

Mexico	2–0	El Salvador
Peralta 64'; J. Hernández 85'	Report

Estadio Corona, Torreón
Attendance: 26,333
Referee: Jafeth Perea (Panama)

=== Group C ===
Pos	Team	Pld	W	D	L	GF	GA	GD	Pts	Qualification	Honduras national football team	Panama national football team	Canada men's national soccer team	Cuba national football team
1	Honduras	6	3	2	1	12	3	+9	11	Advance to fourth round	—	0–2	8–1	1–0
2	Panama	6	3	2	1	6	2	+4	11	Advance to fourth round	0–0	—	2–0	1–0
3	Canada	6	3	1	2	6	10	−4	10		0–0	1–0	—	3–0
4	Cuba	6	0	1	5	1	10	−9	1		0–3	1–1	0–1	—

8 June 2012
14:00 UTC−4

Cuba	0–1	Canada
	Report	Occean 54'

Estadio Pedro Marrero, Havana
Attendance: 7,000
Referee: Courtney Campbell (Jamaica)
8 June 2012
19:30 UTC−6

Honduras	0–2	Panama
	Report	Pérez 65', 80'

Estadio Olímpico Metropolitano, San Pedro Sula
Attendance: 28,215
Referee: Roberto García (Mexico)

12 June 2012
19:45 UTC−4

Canada	0–0	Honduras
	Report

BMO Field, Toronto
Attendance: 16,132
Referee: Enrico Wijngaarde (Suriname)
12 June 2012
20:05 UTC−5

Panama	1–0	Cuba
Barahona 57'	Report

Estadio Rommel Fernández, Panama City
Attendance: 21,000
Referee: Mark Geiger (United States)

7 September 2012
15:00 UTC−4

Cuba	0–3	Honduras
	Report	Bengtson 32'; Bernárdez 62'; Chávez 90+3'

Estadio Pedro Marrero, Havana
Attendance: 8,000
Referee: Wálter Quesada (Costa Rica)
7 September 2012
19:45 UTC−4

Canada	1–0	Panama
De Rosario 77'	Report

BMO Field, Toronto
Attendance: 17,586
Referee: Jeffrey Solís (Costa Rica)

11 September 2012
20:05 UTC−5

Panama	2–0	Canada
Blackburn 22'; Pérez 57'	Report

Estadio Rommel Fernández, Panama City
Attendance: 20,000
Referee: Elmer Bonilla (El Salvador)
11 September 2012
19:30 UTC−6

Honduras	1–0	Cuba
Bengtson 33'	Report

Estadio Olímpico Metropolitano, San Pedro Sula
Attendance: 12,000
Referee: Walter López (Guatemala)

12 October 2012
19:45 UTC−4

Canada	3–0	Cuba
Ricketts 14'; Johnson 73'; Edgar 78'	Report

BMO Field, Toronto
Attendance: 17,712
Referee: Javier Santos (Puerto Rico)
12 October 2012
21:05 UTC−5

Panama	0–0	Honduras
	Report

Estadio Rommel Fernández, Panama City
Attendance: 27,000
Referee: Joel Aguilar (El Salvador)

16 October 2012
16:00 UTC−4

Cuba	1–1	Panama
Gómez 37'	Report	Barahona 77'

Estadio Pedro Marrero, Havana
Attendance: 3,500
Referee: Stanley Lancaster (Guyana)
16 October 2012
14:00 UTC−6

Honduras	8–1	Canada
Bengtson 7', 17', 83'; Costly 29', 49', 88'; Martínez 33', 61'	Report	Hume 77'

Estadio Olímpico Metropolitano, San Pedro Sula
Attendance: 38,000
Referee: Mauricio Morales (Mexico)

== Goalscorers ==
There were 100 goals scored in 36 matches, for an average of 2.78 goals per match.

6 goals

- (Costa Rica) Álvaro Saborío

5 goals

- (Guatemala) Carlos Ruiz
- (Honduras) Jerry Bengtson
- (United States) Clint Dempsey

3 goals

- (El Salvador) Osael Romero
- (Honduras) Carlo Costly
- (Mexico) Javier Hernández
- (Panama) Blas Pérez

2 goals

- (Antigua and Barbuda) Peter Byers
- (Costa Rica) Randall Brenes
- (Costa Rica) Joel Campbell
- (El Salvador) Isidro Gutiérrez
- (Guatemala) Dwight Pezzarossi
- (Guyana) Trayon Bobb
- (Honduras) Mario Martínez
- (Jamaica) Demar Phillips
- (Jamaica) Dane Richards
- (Jamaica) Luton Shelton
- (Mexico) Oribe Peralta
- (Mexico) Carlos Salcido
- (Mexico) Jesús Zavala
- (Panama) Nelson Barahona
- (United States) Carlos Bocanegra
- (United States) Herculez Gomez
- (United States) Eddie Johnson

1 goal

- (Antigua and Barbuda) Dexter Blackstock
- (Antigua and Barbuda) Quinton Griffith
- (Canada) Dwayne De Rosario
- (Canada) David Edgar
- (Canada) Iain Hume
- (Canada) Will Johnson
- (Canada) Olivier Occean
- (Canada) Tosaint Ricketts
- (Costa Rica) Christian Bolaños
- (Costa Rica) Celso Borges
- (Costa Rica) José Miguel Cubero
- (Costa Rica) Cristian Gamboa
- (Cuba) Alberto Gómez
- (El Salvador) Jaime Alas
- (El Salvador) Rafael Burgos
- (El Salvador) Alfredo Pacheco
- (Guatemala) Carlos Figueroa
- (Guatemala) Marco Pappa
- (Guyana) Chris Nurse
- (Guyana) Gregory Richardson
- (Honduras) Víctor Bernárdez
- (Honduras) Marvin Chávez
- (Jamaica) Rodolph Austin
- (Jamaica) Ryan Johnson
- (Jamaica) Nyron Nosworthy
- (Mexico) Giovani dos Santos
- (Mexico) Andrés Guardado
- (Mexico) Héctor Moreno
- (Mexico) Ángel Reyna
- (Panama) Rolando Blackburn

1 own goal

- (Guyana) Charles Pollard (against Mexico)
- (Guyana) J. P. Rodrigues (against Mexico)
- (Mexico) Héctor Moreno (against Guyana)
