= Jaime Alas =

Salvadoran footballer (born 1989)

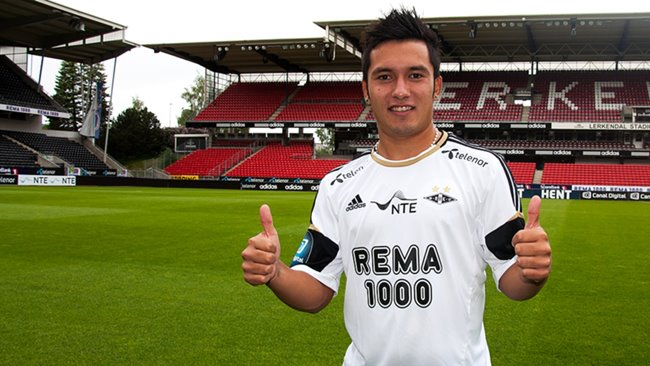
- Alas with Rosenborg in 2012

Personal information
- Full name: Jaime Enrique Alas Morales
- Date of birth: 30 July 1989 (age 37)
- Place of birth: San Salvador, El Salvador
- Height: 1.72 m (5 ft 8 in)
- Position: Midfielder

Team information
- Current team: Guastatoya

Youth career
- 2006: San Salvador
- 2006–2009: River Plate

Senior career*
Years	Team	Apps	(Gls)
2010–2012	Luis Ángel Firpo	34	(6)
2012–2013	Rosenborg	3	(0)
2013	→ San Jose Earthquakes (loan)	5	(0)
2014	Ballenas Galeana	9	(2)
2014–2015	FAS	15	(3)
2015–2023	Municipal	343	(10)
2023–2024	Antigua	34	(0)
2024–2025	Guastatoya	14	(1)

International career^{‡}
2010–	El Salvador	75	(6)
- * Club domestic league appearances and goals as of 8 February 2021 ‡ National team caps and goals as of 19 November 2019

Jaime Enrique Alas Morales (born 30 July 1989) is a Salvadoran professional footballer who plays as a midfielder, last playing for Liga Nacional club Guastatoya, and plays for the El Salvador national football team.

== Club career ==
Alas' professional career began in July 2006, at the age of 16, when he signed a contract with the now defunct Salvadoran club San Salvador. Shortly after, he moved to Argentina to play in the reserves of River Plate. He spent four years at the club before returning to El Salvador in 2010 to join Luis Ángel Firpo.

On 29 June 2012, Alas signed a three-year contract with Rosenborg, and joined the club when the Norwegian transfer window opened on 1 August 2012. He made his debut in a Europa League Qualification match against Servette.

Alas only played a total of seven matches for Rosenborg until he in July 2013 signed a loan deal with the San Jose Earthquakes that lasted until the end of the season in December. After he returned from loan, he transferred to the Mexican second-tier team Ballenas Galeana. In May 2014, it was announced Ballenas Galeana was sold to Club Irapuato in the Mexican Ascenso MX, Jaime Alas was sold to FAS in 2014.

== International career ==
Alas made his debut for El Salvador in an October 2010 friendly match against Panama. Jaime Alas was called up by José Luis Rugamas to train with the senior team in preparation for the 2011 Central American Cup in January 2010. He was successfully able to participate in the 2011 Copa Centroamericana and earned his first goal against the Nicaragua national football team on 14 January 2011. Jaime Alas took part at the 2011 CONCACAF Gold Cup. On 26 March 2012, he scored a goal in the 90+4' against the United States to send El Salvador to the semi-finals of the 2012 CONCACAF Men's Olympic Qualifying Tournament.

== Career statistics ==
=== Club ===
As of 20 September 2013

Appearances and goals by club, season and competition
Club	Season	League			National cup		League cup		Continental		Total	
Club	Season	Division	Apps	Goals	Apps	Goals	Apps	Goals	Apps	Goals	Apps	Goals
Rosenborg	2012	Tippeligaen	3	0	0	0	0	0	2	0	5	0
Rosenborg	2013	Tippeligaen	0	0	0	0	0	0	0	0	0	0
Rosenborg	Total		3	0	0	0	0	0	2	0	5	0
San Jose Earthquakes	2013	MLS	5	0	0	0	0	0	3	0	8	0
Career total			8	0	0	0	0	0	4	0	13	0

=== International ===
Appearances and goals by national team and year
National team	Year	Apps	Goals
El Salvador	2010	2	0
El Salvador	2011	20	4
El Salvador	2012	10	2
El Salvador	2013	1	0
El Salvador	2014	5	0
El Salvador	2015	15	0
El Salvador	2016	5	0
El Salvador	2017	3	0
El Salvador	2018	4	0
El Salvador	2019	8	0
El Salvador	2020	–	
El Salvador	2021	2	0
Total		75	6

Scores and results list El Salvador's goal tally first, score column indicates score after each Alas goal.

List of international goals scored by Jaime Alas
No.	Date	Venue	Opponent	Score	Result	Competition
1	14 January 2011	Estadio Rommel Fernández, Panama City, Panama	Nicaragua	1–0	2–0	2011 Copa Centroamericana
2	16 January 2011	Estadio Rommel Fernández, Panama City, Panama	Belize	4–1	5–2	2011 Copa Centroamericana
3	29 March 2011	Estadio Cuscatlán, San Salvador, El Salvador	Jamaica	1–2	2–3	Friendly
4	11 October 2011	Estadio Cuscatlan, San Salvador, El Salvador	Cayman Islands	3–0	4–0	2014 FIFA World Cup qualification
5	26 May 2012	Cotton Bowl, Dallas, United States	Moldova	2–0	2–0	Friendly
6	11 September 2012	Providence Stadium, Providence, Guyana	Guyana	2–1	3–2	2014 FIFA World Cup qualification

== Honours ==
Municipal

- Liga Nacional de Guatemala: Clausura 2017, Apertura 2019
