= Tremain Paul =

Saint Lucian footballer

Tremain Shayn Paul
Personal information
- Full name: Tremain Shayn Paul
- Date of birth: 12 August 1991 (age 35)
- Place of birth: Micoud, Saint Lucia
- Position: Midfielder

Team information
- Current team: W Connection F.C.
- Number: 11

Senior career*
Years	Team	Apps	(Gls)
2013–	W Connection		

International career^{‡}
2011–2019	Saint Lucia	24	(4)
- * Club domestic league appearances and goals ‡ National team caps and goals as of 05:47, 4 March 2017 (UTC)

Tremain Shayn Paul (born 12 August 1991) is a Saint Lucian international footballer who plays as a midfielder for Williams Connection.

== Career ==
He made his international debut for Saint Lucia in 2011, and has appeared in FIFA World Cup qualifying matches.

=== International Goals ===
Scores and results list Saint Lucia's goal tally first.

#	Date	Venue	Opponent	Score	Result	Competition
1	2 September 2011	BMO Field, Toronto, Canada	Canada	1–1	1–4	2014 FIFA World Cup qualification
2	21 October 2012	Beausejour Stadium, Gros Islet, St Lucia	Curaçao	1–0	5–1	2012 Caribbean Cup qualification
3	5 September 2014	Warner Park, Basseterre, St Kitts	Guyana	2–0	2–4	2014 Caribbean Cup qualification
4	10 June 2015	Sir Vivian Richards Stadium, North Sound, Antigua	Antigua and Barbuda	1–1	3–1	2018 FIFA World Cup qualification
