= Jack Michael Morillo =

Dominican footballer

Personal information
- Full name: Jack Michael Morillo
- Date of birth: 24 October 1986 (age 40)
- Place of birth: Dominican Republic
- Position: Forward

Team information
- Current team: Club Deportivo Pantoja

Senior career*
Years	Team	Apps	(Gls)
2010–	Club Deportivo Pantoja	26	(7)

International career
2011–	Dominican Republic	2	(1)
- * Club domestic league appearances and goals

Jack Michael Morillo (born 26 October 1986) is a Dominican footballer who plays as a forward. He played at the 2014 FIFA World Cup qualifier.
