= Gerson Rodas =

Honduran football midfielder (born 1990)

Personal information
- Full name: Gerson Daniel Rodas Leiva
- Date of birth: 6 July 1990 (age 36)
- Place of birth: San Pedro Sula, Honduras
- Height: 1.80 m (5 ft 11 in)
- Position: Midfielder

Team information
- Current team: Honduras Progreso

Senior career*
Years	Team	Apps	(Gls)
2010–2016	Real España	132	(14)
2016–2018	Olimpia	51	(2)
2018–2019	Platense	18	(4)
2019–	Honduras Progreso	23	(1)

International career
2012	Honduras U23	3	(2)
2013	Honduras	1	(0)
- * Club domestic league appearances and goals as of 03:27, 21 February 2020 (UTC)

Gerson Daniel Rodas Leiva (born 6 July 1990) is a Honduran footballer who plays as a midfielder for Honduras Progreso in the Liga Nacional de Fútbol de Honduras.

== International career ==
Rodas scored two goals for the Honduras U-23 team in the 2012 CONCACAF Men's Olympic Qualifying Tournament semifinals against El Salvador which meant the qualification to the 2012 Summer Olympics.

== Statistics ==
=== International goals ===
No.	Date	Venue	Playing for	Playing against	Scored	Result	Competition
1	31 March 2012	Kansas City	Honduras	El Salvador	2–1	3–2	2012 CONCACAF U-23
2	31 March 2012	Kansas City	Honduras	El Salvador	3–2	3–2	2012 CONCACAF U-23
