= Listner Pierre-Louis =

Association football player (born 1989)

Personal information
- Full name: Kennel Listner Pierre-Louis
- Date of birth: 31 January 1989 (age 37)
- Place of birth: Montfermeil, France
- Height: 1.82 m (6 ft 0 in)
- Position: Midfielder

Team information
- Current team: Rumilly-Vallières
- Number: 19

Senior career*
Years	Team	Apps	(Gls)
2008–2012	Vannes	4	(0)
2013	Thiers	15	(6)
2013–2018	Le Puy	115	(19)
2018–2020	Jura Sud	31	(5)
2020	Bourges Foot	1	(0)
2020–	Rumilly-Vallières	7	(0)

International career
2010–2017	Haiti	10	(1)
- * Club domestic league appearances and goals as of 01:25, 28 April 2022 (UTC)

Listner Pierre-Louis (born 31 January 1989) is a professional footballer who plays as a midfielder for Championnat National 1 club Rumilly-Vallières. Born in France, he is a former Haiti international.
