= Isidro Gutiérrez =

Salvadoran footballer (born 1989)

Personal information
- Full name: José Isidro Gutiérrez Vásquez
- Date of birth: 21 October 1989 (age 37)
- Place of birth: Moncagua, El Salvador
- Height: 1.75 m (5 ft 9 in)
- Position: Midfielder

Youth career
- 2002–2003: Atlético Chaparratique
- 2004–2007: Municipal Limeño

Senior career*
Years	Team	Apps	(Gls)
2007–2010	Municipal Limeño	34	(1)
2010–2013	Águila	65	(7)
2013	Motagua	9	(0)
2013–2015	Alianza	31	(2)
2015–2017	Águila	37	(1)
2017–2018	Pasaquina	44	(11)
2018–2019	Municipal Limeño		

International career
2010	El Salvador U21		
2012	El Salvador U23		
2012–2013	El Salvador	8	(2)
- * Club domestic league appearances and goals

José Isidro Gutiérrez Vásquez (born 21 October 1989), is a Salvadoran former professional footballer who played as a midfielder.

== Club career ==
Gutiérrez started off his professional career in Municipal Limeño. He had previously been a part of their youth academy. He later moved on to one of the top teams in the country, Águila.

On 15 May 2013, Gutiérrez signed with Motagua of the Liga Nacional de Fútbol de Honduras, coming off two months as a free agent.

On 10 December 2013, Gutiérrez returned home joining Alianza from Motagua of the Liga Nacional de Fútbol de Honduras.

== International career ==
Gutiérrez made his national team debut with the El Salvador national team under coach Mauricio Alfaro. He made his under-21 debut on 10 March 2010, in a friendly match against Guatemala.

In that same game, Gutiérrez scored both of the goals for El Salvador to tie and end the game at 2–2. Alfaro was so impressed with Gutiérrez 's performance, that he was automatically selected as the midfielder for the next game against the Honduran U-21 side in the 2010 CAC qualification first leg match. He was once again the key player in that match, scoring the only goal of the game to give El Salvador U-21 the victory on Honduran soil.

Gutiérrez also scored a goal in an exhibition game in a 2–1 loss to Serie A club Roma on 27 July 2012.

== Career statistics ==
No.	Date	Venue	Opponent	Score	Result	Competition
1	8 June 2012	Estadio Nacional, San Jose, Costa Rica	Costa Rica	1–2	2–2	WCQ – 3R
2	7 September 2012	Estadio Cuscatlán, San Salvador, El Salvador	Guyana	1–0	2–2	WCQ – 3R
