= Sheridan Grosvenor =

Barbadian footballer (born 1978)

Rudy Grosvenor
Personal information
- Full name: Sheridan Rudolph Grosvenor
- Date of birth: 27 July 1978
- Place of birth: Bridgetown, Barbados
- Date of death: 29 August 2021 (aged 43)
- Position: Midfielder

Senior career*
Years	Team	Apps	(Gls)
2005–2014	Notre Dame Bayville		
2014–2018	Waterford Compton		

International career
2000–2011	Barbados	24	(1)
- * Club domestic league appearances and goals

Sheridan Grosvenor (27 July 1978 – 29 August 2021) was a Barbadian footballer who played during the 2014 FIFA World Cup qualification. He played as a defender. Grosvenor died of cancer on 29 August 2021.
