= Evani Esperance =

Surinamese footballer

Personal information
- Full name: Evani Silinzi Esperance
- Date of birth: 30 November 1990 (age 35)
- Place of birth: Totness, Suriname
- Height: 1.60 m (5 ft 3 in)
- Position: Striker

Senior career*
Years	Team	Apps	(Gls)
2011–2014	Voorwaarts		
2014–2018	Botopasi		
2018–2019	Happy Boys		
2019–	Bintang Lahir		

International career
- Suriname U17
2011–2016	Suriname	16	(2)
- * Club domestic league appearances and goals

Evani Silinzi Esperance (born 30 November 1990) is a Surinamese professional footballer who plays as a striker for SVB Eerste Divisie club Bintang Lahir.

== International career ==
Esperance represented the Suriname national under-17 team during the 2007 CONCACAF U17 Tournament qualification. He played for the senior team from 2011 to 2016, and would go on to score 2 goals in 16 matches.

=== International goals ===
Suriname score listed first, score column indicates score after each Esperance goal.

List of international goals scored by Evani Esperance
No.	Cap	Date	Venue	Opponent	Score	Result	Competition	Ref.
1	3	25 September 2011	André Kamperveen Stadion, Paramaribo, Suriname	Curaçao	1–0	2–2	Friendly	
2	4	11 November 2011	André Kamperveen Stadion, Paramaribo, Suriname	El Salvador	1–3	1–3	2014 FIFA World Cup qualification	
