= Angelo Cijntje =

Curaçaoan footballer (born 1980)

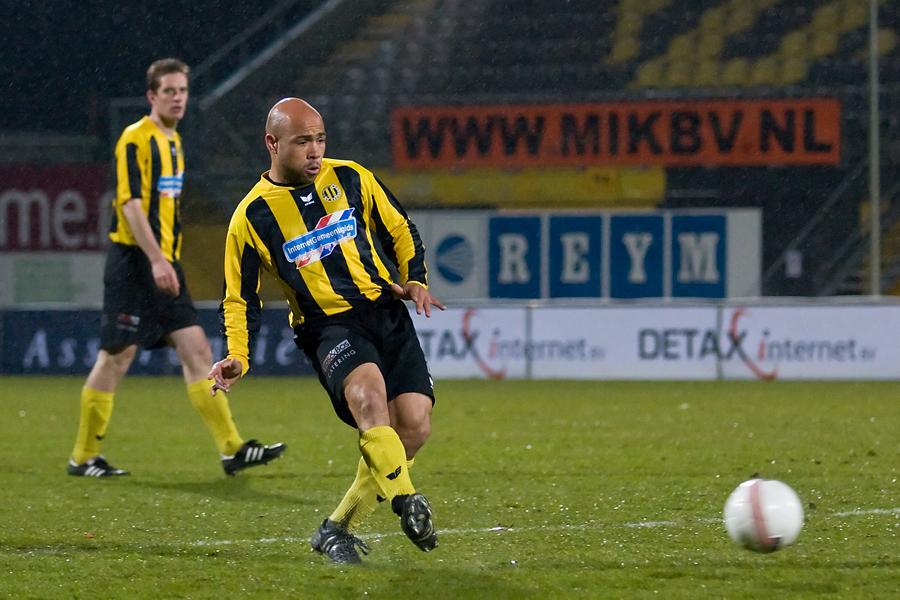
- Cijntje with Veendam in 2008

Personal information
- Full name: Ryangelo Cijntje
- Date of birth: 26 July 1981 (age 45)
- Place of birth: Willemstad, Netherlands Antilles
- Height: 1.67 m (5 ft 6 in)
- Position: Right-back

Team information
- Current team: Curaçao (performance coach)

Youth career
- Meeuwenplaat
- Spijkenisse
- Heerenveen

Senior career*
Years	Team	Apps	(Gls)
2000–2002	Heerenveen	0	(0)
2001	→ KuPS (loan)	32	(1)
2002–2013	Veendam	309	(6)
2013–2014	Groningen	1	(0)
2014–2016	ACV		
2016–2019	Veendam 1894		

International career
2004–2008	Netherlands Antilles	8	(0)
2011	Curaçao	6	(1)
- * Club domestic league appearances and goals

Ryangelo "Angelo" Cijntje (born 9 November 1980) is a Curaçaoan football coach and former player who is the performance coach of the Curaçao national team.

Cijntje played most of his career as a right-back for Veendam.

== Club career ==
=== Veendam ===
Cijntje played eight seasons with Veendam before appearing to leave the club when it was declared bankrupt in May 2010. However, initially the club was able to have its bankruptcy reversed and he continued playing for the club in the following season. The following season, Veendam were struggling financially again, and eventually went bankrupt on 25 March 2013.

=== Groningen ===
As a free agent, Cijntje signed for Groningen the following season, playing in the reserves for most of the season. In April 2014, Cijntje appeared on the bench during a couple of Groningen's Eredivisie matches.

On 3 May 2014, in a home match against Heracles, Cijntje came on as a substitute in the 84th minute, making his debut for the club at age 33. During the minutes he played, the Groningen supporters can be heard chanting his name and singing "All balls on Cijntje".

=== Later career ===
He retired from professional football at the end of the season and signed with Hoofdklasse side ACV. From the 2016–17 season, Cijntje played three seasons for Veendam 1894. He retired from football altogether in May 2019, after suffering a series of injuries.

== International career ==
Cijntje made his debut for the Netherlands Antilles in a January 2004 friendly match against Suriname. He then played in all FIFA World Cup qualifying matches they played later that year.

== Career statistics ==
Score and results list Curaçao's goal tally first.

#	Date	Venue	Opponent	Score	Result	Competition
1.	15 November 2011	Ergilio Hato Stadium, Willemstad	U.S. Virgin Islands	6–1	6–1	2014 World Cup qualifier
