= Orin de Waard =

Curaçao footballer

Personal information
- Full name: Orin Erick de Waard
- Date of birth: 4 December 1983 (age 42)
- Place of birth: Den Helder, Netherlands
- Position: Forward

Senior career*
Years	Team	Apps	(Gls)
2007–2008	Achilles '29		
2008–2009	JVC Cuijk		
2009–2011	De Treffers	25	(6)
2011–2012	FC Lienden	24	(10)
2012–2013	DIO '30		
2013–2016	HCSC Den Helder		
2016–2017	DFS		

International career
2011	Curaçao	2	(1)
- * Club domestic league appearances and goals

Orin de Waard (born 4 December 1983) is a Curaçaoan former footballer who played as a forward.

== Club career ==
De Waard played for a number of amateur club sides in the Netherlands

== International career ==
On 2 September 2011 he made his debut for the Curaçao national football team in a World Cup 2014 Qualifier against Antigua and Barbuda national football team
