= Friso Mando =

Surinamese footballer (born 1990)

Friso Cabinho Mando (born 9 June 1990 in Brokopondo) is a Surinamese footballer who plays as a midfielder. He played at the 2014 FIFA World Cup qualifier.
