= 2014 FIFA World Cup qualification (CONCACAF) =

Tournament details
- Dates: 15 June 2011 – 15 October 2013
- Teams: 35 (from 1 confederation)

Tournament statistics
- Matches played: 142
- Goals scored: 435 (3.06 per match)
- Attendance: 2,070,607 (14,582 per match)
- Top scorer(s): (Belize) Deon McCaulay (11 goals)

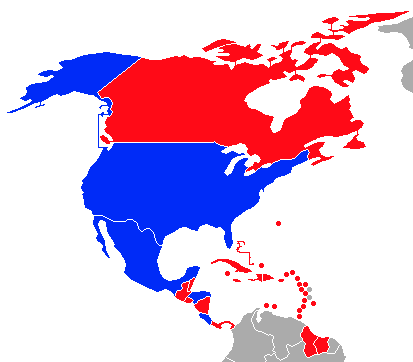
Country qualified Country failed to qualify

The CONCACAF qualification for the 2014 FIFA World Cup consisted of four rounds of competition, in which the 35 member nations competed for three automatic berths at the finals in Brazil.

The United States, Costa Rica, and Honduras qualified. The fourth-place finisher, Mexico, played a two-game series against New Zealand, the first-placed team from Oceania and qualified to the Finals.

== Format ==
In March 2011, following news that CONCACAF would not receive four spots in the 2014 World Cup, officials within CONCACAF indicated that the first format proposed would be revised. Several days later, officials within CONCACAF announced the qualifying format they would present to FIFA. The proposed format, which was subsequently accepted by FIFA, consists of 4 stages.

1. Round One. Teams ranked 26–35 will play-off to reduce the number of entrants to 30.
2. Round Two. 6 groups of 4 teams. This round includes the 5 qualifiers from the preliminary round plus teams ranked 7–25. The top team in each group advances to the next stage.
3. Round Three (Semi-final round). 3 groups of 4. Teams ranked 1–6 face off against the 6 group winners from the previous round. The top two in each group advance.
4. Round Four (Hexagonal). The top two teams in each group from the semi-final round compete in one group of 6. The top three teams advance to the World Cup finals, while the 4th place team advances to an intercontinental play-off.

== Entrants ==
All 35 FIFA-affiliated national teams from CONCACAF entered qualification. The seeding – used to draw the first three rounds of the qualifiers – was based on the FIFA World Rankings of March 2011. (World rankings shown in parentheses)

Bye to third round (ranked 1st to 6th)	Bye to second round (ranked 7th to 25th)	Competing in first round (ranked 26th to 35th)
1. United States (19); 2. Mexico (27); 3. Honduras (38); 4. Jamaica (48); 5. Costa Rica (53); 6. Cuba (64)	7. Panama (68); 8. Canada (84); 9. El Salvador (92); 10. Grenada (94); 11. Trinidad and Tobago (95); 12. Haiti (99); 13. Antigua and Barbuda (101); 14. Guyana (109); 15. Suriname (114); 16. Saint Kitts and Nevis (119); 17. Guatemala (125); 18. Dominica (130); 19. Puerto Rico (131); 20. Barbados (137); 21. Curaçao (146); 22. Saint Vincent and the Grenadines (148); 23. Cayman Islands (158); 24. Nicaragua (164); 25. Bermuda (165)	26. Belize (166); 27. Dominican Republic (166); 28. British Virgin Islands (177); 29. Saint Lucia (182); 30. Turks and Caicos Islands (193); 31. Bahamas (193); 32. Aruba (199); 33. U.S. Virgin Islands (200); 34. Anguilla (202); 35. Montserrat (202)

== Schedule ==
The schedule of the competition was as follows.

Round	Matchday	Date
First round	First leg	15 June – 17 July 2011
First round	Second leg	15 June – 17 July 2011
Second round	Matchday 1	2–18 September 2011
Second round	Matchday 2	2–18 September 2011
Second round	Matchday 3	7–15 October 2011
Second round	Matchday 4	7–15 October 2011
Second round	Matchday 5	11–15 November 2011
Second round	Matchday 6	11–15 November 2011
Third round	Matchday 1	8–12 June 2012
Third round	Matchday 2	8–12 June 2012
Third round	Matchday 3	7–11 September 2012
Third round	Matchday 4	7–11 September 2012
Third round	Matchday 5	12–16 October 2012
Third round	Matchday 6	12–16 October 2012

Round	Matchday	Date
Fourth round	Matchday 1	6 February 2013
Fourth round	Matchday 2	22–26 March 2013
Fourth round	Matchday 3	22–26 March 2013
Fourth round	Matchday 4	4–18 June 2013
Fourth round	Matchday 5	4–18 June 2013
Fourth round	Matchday 6	4–18 June 2013
Fourth round	Matchday 7	6–10 September 2013
Fourth round	Matchday 8	6–10 September 2013
Fourth round	Matchday 9	11–15 October 2013
Fourth round	Matchday 10	11–15 October 2013

The inter-confederation play-off between the fourth-placed team from CONCACAF (Mexico) and the winning team from OFC (New Zealand) was played between 13 and 20 November 2013.

== First round ==
The first round of the CONCACAF qualifiers saw the bottom 10 teams being paired up into five home-and-away series, with the highest ranked team facing the lowest ranked team and so on. The winners of these series proceeded to the second round.

The matchups were announced by FIFA on 26 April 2011. Early indications were that the matches would be played on 3 and 7 June 2011; However, the matches were postponed to scattered days in June and July, between 15 June and 17 July. The 5 winners (in bold, below) advanced to the second round of the CONCACAF qualifiers: Belize, Dominican Republic, U.S. Virgin Islands, Saint Lucia, and the Bahamas.

The two wins for the U.S. Virgin Islands were their first two ever in World Cup play, with their only other win prior to this coming in 1998.

Team 1	Agg.	Team 2	1st leg	2nd leg
Montserrat	3–8	**Belize**	2–5	1–3
Anguilla	0–6	**Dominican Republic**	0–2	0–4
**U.S. Virgin Islands**	4–1	British Virgin Islands	2–0	2–1
Aruba	6–6 (4–5 p)	**Saint Lucia**	4–2	2–4 (a.e.t.)
Turks and Caicos Islands	0–10^{1}	**Bahamas**	0–4	0–6

- Note 1: Order of legs reversed from originally published draw.

== Second round ==
In the second round, the teams ranked 7–25 were joined by the 5 winners from the first round. These teams were drawn into six groups of four teams, at the World Cup Preliminary Draw at the Marina da Glória in Rio de Janeiro, Brazil on 30 July 2011. The matches were played from 2 September to 15 November 2011.

The top team from each group advanced to the third round.

=== Seeding ===
Teams were seeded into four pots – designated Pots 4 to 7 in the draw. Pot 4 included teams ranked 7–12, Pot 5 teams ranked 13–18, Pot 6 teams ranked 19–24, and Pot 7 the team ranked 25 along with the 5 first round winners.

Pot 4	Pot 5	Pot 6	Pot 7
Panama; Canada; El Salvador; Grenada; Trinidad and Tobago; Haiti	Antigua and Barbuda; Guyana; Suriname; Saint Kitts and Nevis; Guatemala; Dominica	Puerto Rico; Barbados; Curaçao; Saint Vincent and the Grenadines; Cayman Islands; Nicaragua	Bermuda; Belize^{†} Dominican Republic^{†} Saint Lucia^{†} Bahamas^{†} U.S. Virgin Islands^{†}

^{†} First round winners

=== Groups ===
==== Group A ====
Pos	Team	Pld	W	D	L	GF	GA	GD	Pts	Qualification	El Salvador national football team	Dominican Republic national football team	Suriname national football team	Cayman Islands national football team
1	El Salvador	6	6	0	0	20	5	+15	18	Advance to third round	—	3–2	4–0	4–0
2	Dominican Republic	6	2	2	2	12	8	+4	8		1–2	—	1–1	4–0
3	Suriname	6	2	1	3	5	11	−6	7		1–3	1–3	—	1–0
4	Cayman Islands	6	0	1	5	2	15	−13	1		1–4	1–1	0–1	—

==== Group B ====
Pos	Team	Pld	W	D	L	GF	GA	GD	Pts	Qualification	Guyana national football team	Trinidad and Tobago national football team	Bermuda national football team	Barbados national football team
1	Guyana	6	4	1	1	9	6	+3	13	Advance to third round	—	2–1	2–1	2–0
2	Trinidad and Tobago	6	4	0	2	12	4	+8	12		3–0 (Note: Match awarded)	—	1–0	4–0
3	Bermuda	6	3	1	2	8	7	+1	10		1–1	2–1	—	2–1
4	Barbados	6	0	0	6	2	14	−12	0		0–2	0–2	1–2	—

==== Group C ====
Pos	Team	Pld	W	D	L	GF	GA	GD	Pts	Qualification	Panama national football team	Nicaragua national football team	Dominica national football team
1	Panama	4	4	0	0	15	2	+13	12	Advance to third round	—	5–1	3–0
2	Nicaragua	4	2	0	2	5	7	−2	6		1–2	—	1–0
3	Dominica	4	0	0	4	0	11	−11	0		0–5	0–2	—

- Bahamas withdrew from the tournament on 19 August 2011 and were not replaced.

==== Group D ====
Pos	Team	Pld	W	D	L	GF	GA	GD	Pts	Qualification	Canada men's national soccer team	Puerto Rico national football team	Saint Kitts and Nevis national football team	Saint Lucia national football team
1	Canada	6	4	2	0	18	1	+17	14	Advance to third round	—	0–0	4–0	4–1
2	Puerto Rico	6	2	3	1	8	4	+4	9		0–3	—	1–1	3–0
3	Saint Kitts and Nevis	6	1	4	1	6	8	−2	7		0–0	0–0	—	1–1
4	Saint Lucia	6	0	1	5	4	23	−19	1		0–7 (Note: Match awarded)	0–4	2–4	—

==== Group E ====
Pos	Team	Pld	W	D	L	GF	GA	GD	Pts	Qualification	Guatemala national football team	Belize national football team	Saint Vincent and the Grenadines national football team	Grenada national football team
1	Guatemala	6	6	0	0	19	3	+16	18	Advance to third round	—	3–1	4–0	3–0
2	Belize	6	2	1	3	9	10	−1	7		1–2	—	1–1	1–4
3	Saint Vincent and the Grenadines	6	1	2	3	4	12	−8	5		0–3	0–2	—	2–1
4	Grenada	6	1	1	4	7	14	−7	4		1–4	0–3	1–1	—

==== Group F ====
Pos	Team	Pld	W	D	L	GF	GA	GD	Pts	Qualification	Antigua and Barbuda national football team	Haiti national football team	Curaçao national football team	United States Virgin Islands national soccer team
1	Antigua and Barbuda	6	5	0	1	28	5	+23	15	Advance to third round	—	1–0	5–2	10–0
2	Haiti	6	4	1	1	21	6	+15	13		2–1	—	2–2	6–0
3	Curaçao	6	2	1	3	15	15	0	7		0–3 (Note: Match awarded)	2–4	—	6–1
4	U.S. Virgin Islands	6	0	0	6	2	40	−38	0		1–8	0–7	0–3	—

== Third round ==
The third round saw the top 6 seeds joined by the 6 group winners from the second round. These teams were drawn into three groups of four teams, at the World Cup Preliminary Draw at the Marina da Glória in Rio de Janeiro, Brazil on 30 July 2011. These matches were played from 8 June to 16 October 2012.

The top two teams from each group advanced to the fourth round.

=== Seeding ===
As the draw for the third round was held before the previous matches were held, only the six teams with byes to the round were known at the time of the draw. Teams were seeded into three pots, with Pot 1 containing the top 3 seeds, Pot 2 seeds 4 to 6, and Pot 3 the 6 group winners from the second round. Each third round group contains one team from Pot 1, one team from Pot 2 and two teams from Pot 3.

Pot 1	Pot 2	Pot 3
United States; Mexico; Honduras	Jamaica; Costa Rica; Cuba	El Salvador^{†} Guyana^{†} Panama^{†} Canada^{†} Guatemala^{†} Antigua and Barbuda^{†}

^{†} Second round winners whose identity was not known at the time of the draw

=== Groups ===
==== Group A ====
Pos	Team	Pld	W	D	L	GF	GA	GD	Pts	Qualification	United States men's national soccer team	Jamaica national football team	Guatemala national football team	Antigua and Barbuda national football team
1	United States	6	4	1	1	11	6	+5	13	Advance to fourth round	—	1–0	3–1	3–1
2	Jamaica	6	3	1	2	9	6	+3	10	Advance to fourth round	2–1	—	2–1	4–1
3	Guatemala	6	3	1	2	9	8	+1	10		1–1	2–1	—	3–1
4	Antigua and Barbuda	6	0	1	5	4	13	−9	1		1–2	0–0	0–1	—

==== Group B ====
Pos	Team	Pld	W	D	L	GF	GA	GD	Pts	Qualification	Mexico national football team	Costa Rica national football team	El Salvador national football team	Guyana national football team
1	Mexico	6	6	0	0	15	2	+13	18	Advance to fourth round	—	1–0	2–0	3–1
2	Costa Rica	6	3	1	2	14	5	+9	10	Advance to fourth round	0–2	—	2–2	7–0
3	El Salvador	6	1	2	3	8	11	−3	5		1–2	0–1	—	2–2
4	Guyana	6	0	1	5	5	24	−19	1		0–5	0–4	2–3	—

==== Group C ====
Pos	Team	Pld	W	D	L	GF	GA	GD	Pts	Qualification	Honduras national football team	Panama national football team	Canada men's national soccer team	Cuba national football team
1	Honduras	6	3	2	1	12	3	+9	11	Advance to fourth round	—	0–2	8–1	1–0
2	Panama	6	3	2	1	6	2	+4	11	Advance to fourth round	0–0	—	2–0	1–0
3	Canada	6	3	1	2	6	10	−4	10		0–0	1–0	—	3–0
4	Cuba	6	0	1	5	1	10	−9	1		0–3	1–1	0–1	—

== Fourth round ==
In the fourth round, the three group winners and three runners-up from the third round competed in a double round robin, including a home and away match against the other five teams between 6 February and 15 October 2013. The round is informally referred to as the 'Hexagonal' or just 'The Hex'. The draw for 'The Hex' was conducted by FIFA on 7 November 2012.

The top three teams qualified directly for the 2014 FIFA World Cup finals, while the fourth-placed team, Mexico, played a home-away series against New Zealand, the winner of Oceania qualifying. Teams are ranked first by total points in all games, then, if tied, by best goal differential in all games, then by total goals in all games. If still tied, the same criteria are applied to games among the tied teams.

Pos	Team	Pld	W	D	L	GF	GA	GD	Pts	Qualification	United States	Costa Rica	Honduras	Mexico	Panama	Jamaica
1	United States	10	7	1	2	15	8	+7	22	Qualification to 2014 FIFA World Cup	—	1–0	1–0	2–0	2–0	2–0
2	Costa Rica	10	5	3	2	13	7	+6	18	Qualification to 2014 FIFA World Cup	3–1	—	1–0	2–1	2–0	2–0
3	Honduras	10	4	3	3	13	12	+1	15	Qualification to 2014 FIFA World Cup	2–1	1–0	—	2–2	2–2	2–0
4	Mexico	10	2	5	3	7	9	−2	11	Advance to inter-confederation play-offs	0–0	0–0	1–2	—	2–1	0–0
5	Panama	10	1	5	4	10	14	−4	8		2–3	2–2	2–0	0–0	—	0–0
6	Jamaica	10	0	5	5	5	13	−8	5		1–2	1–1	2–2	0–1	1–1	—

== Inter-confederation play-offs ==
The winner of the OFC qualification tournament, New Zealand, played against CONCACAF's fourth-placed team, Mexico, in a home-and-away play-off. Mexico, the winner of this play-off, qualified for the 2014 FIFA World Cup.

The first leg was played on 13 November 2013 in Mexico City, and the second leg was played on 20 November 2013 in Wellington.

Team 1	Agg.	Team 2	1st leg	2nd leg
Mexico	9–3	New Zealand	5–1	4–2

== Qualified teams ==
The following four teams from CONCACAF qualified for the final tournament.

Team	Qualified as	Qualified on	Previous appearances in FIFA World Cup^{1}
United States	Fourth round winners	10 September 2013	9 (1930, 1934, 1950, 1990, 1994, 1998, 2002, 2006, 2010)
Costa Rica	Fourth round runners-up	10 September 2013	3 (1990, 2002, 2006)
Honduras	Fourth round third place	15 October 2013	2 (1982, 2010)
Mexico	CONCACAF–OFC play-off winners	20 November 2013	14 (1930, 1950, 1954, 1958, 1962, 1966, 1970, 1978, 1986, 1994, 1998, 2002, 2006, 2010)

^{1} Bold indicates champions for that year. Italic indicates hosts for that year.

== Top goalscorers ==
There were 435 goals scored in 142 matches, for an average of 3.06 goals per match.

11 goals

- (Belize) Deon McCaulay

10 goals

- (Antigua and Barbuda) Peter Byers
- (Mexico) Oribe Peralta
- (Panama) Blas Pérez

9 goals

- (Honduras) Jerry Bengtson

8 goals

- (Costa Rica) Álvaro Saborío
- (United States) Clint Dempsey

7 goals

- (Honduras) Carlo Costly
- (Panama) Luis Tejada

6 goals

- (Antigua and Barbuda) Tamarley Thomas
- (Curaçao) Rocky Siberie
- (El Salvador) Osael Romero
- (Guatemala) Carlos Ruiz

5 goals

- (The Bahamas) Lesly St. Fleur
- (Dominican Republic) Erick Ozuna
- (Haiti) Jean-Eudes Maurice
- (Mexico) Javier Hernández

Below are full goalscorer lists for each round:

- First round
- Second round
- Third round
- Fourth round
