= Edwin Sánchez (footballer) =

Salvadoran footballer (born 1990)

Personal information
- Full name: Edwin Ernesto Sánchez Vigil
- Date of birth: February 21, 1990 (age 36)
- Place of birth: Santa Tecla, El Salvador
- Height: 1.72 m (5 ft 8 in)
- Position: Midfielder

Youth career
- San Salvador academy

Senior career*
Years	Team	Apps	(Gls)
2006–2007	Turín FESA		
2008	Defensa y Justicia (youth)		
2009–2010	Santa Tecla		
2010–2011	UES		
2011–2012	Isidro Metapán		
2012–2013	FAS		
2014	Santa Tecla		
2015–2016	Atlético Marte		
2016	Sonsonate		
2017	UES		
2017–2018	Águila	47	(1)
2018–2019	Chalatenango		
2019–2020	Municipal Limeño		

International career
- El Salvador U-20
- El Salvador U-21
2010–	El Salvador	17	(2)
- * Club domestic league appearances and goals

Edwin Ernesto Sánchez Vigil (born 21 February 1990) is a Salvadoran professional footballer who plays as a midfielder.

== Club career ==
=== Turín FESA FC ===
Sánchez started his career at Turín FESA before a stint in Argentinian youth football with Defensa y Justicia.

=== Santa Tecla FC ===
He returned to El Salvador to play for Segunda División club Santa Tecla, and made his debut in the Primera División de Fútbol de El Salvador with UES a year later.

=== Isidro Metapán ===
Sánchez signed with Isidro Metapán for the Apertura 2011. With Isidro Metapán, Sánchez reached the final of that tournament, defeating Once Municipal 1–0. Sánchez was a substitute in that final.

=== FAS ===
Sánchez signed with FAS in 2012.

=== Return to Santa Tecla FC ===
Sánchez signed again with Santa Tecla for the Clausura 2014.

=== Águila ===
Sánchez signed with Águila for the Apertura 2017.

In December 2018, Sanchéz's contract was not renewed by Águila.

== International career ==
Sánchez made his debut for El Salvador in an October 2010 friendly match against Panama. He was called up by José Luis Rugamas to train with the senior team in preparation for the 2011 Central American Cup in January 2010.

He has represented his country in 6 FIFA World Cup qualification matches, was successfully able to participate in the 2011 Copa Centroamericana and was a non-playing squad member at the 2011 CONCACAF Gold Cup. He scored his first goal in a 2–1 win against Venezuela.

=== International goals ===
Scores and results list El Salvador's goal tally first.

#	Date	Venue	Opponent	Score	Result	Competition
1	7 August 2011	RFK Memorial Stadium, Washington, D.C., United States	Venezuela	2–1	2–1	Friendly
1	11 November 2011	André Kamperveen Stadion, Paramaribo, Suriname	Suriname	3–0	3–1	2014 FIFA World Cup qualification

== Honours ==
=== A.D. Isidro Metapán ===
Primera División de Fútbol de El Salvador: (1) Apertura 2011
