= Rocky Siberie =

Curaçaoan footballer

Personal information
- Full name: Richmar Simon Sabino Siberie
- Date of birth: 24 March 1982 (age 44)
- Place of birth: Willemstad, Curaçao, Netherlands Antilles
- Height: 1.79 m (5 ft 10 in)
- Position: Forward

Team information
- Current team: Camporosso

Youth career
- CRKSV Jong Colombia
- SC Heerenveen

Senior career*
Years	Team	Apps	(Gls)
2002–2003	SC Heerenveen	0	(0)
2003–2004	Cambuur Leeuwarden	14	(1)
2004–2005	FC St. Pauli	15	(1)
2005	Maribor	16	(5)
2006	Wuppertaler SV	25	(5)
2007	Valletta	12	(7)
2007–2008	SV Straelen	26	(8)
2008	FC Dordrecht	11	(2)
2009–2010	USC Wilhelmina Hercules	6	(3)
2010–2014	Pro Settimo & Eureka		
2014–2017	Ospedaletti		
2017–2018	Sanremo 80		
2018–2019	Argentina Arma		
2019	Carlin's Boys		
2019–	Camporosso		

International career
2004–2008	Netherlands Antilles	9	(3)
2011	Curaçao	6	(6)
- * Club domestic league appearances and goals

Richmar Siberie (born 24 March 1982), also known as Rocky, is a Curaçaoan professional footballer who plays as a forward for Italian club Camporosso.

== Club career ==
Born in Willemstad, Curaçao, in the former Netherlands Antilles, Siberie began his career with Dutch side Cambuur Leeuwarden.

He played for Maribor in the Slovenian PrvaLiga during the 2005–06 season. He started the 2006–07 season with Wuppertaler SV in Germany in the Regionalliga Nord. During the January 2007 transfer window, Siberie moved to Malta and joined Valletta, scoring four goals in his first match against Marsa (6–1) on 3 February 2007. He is the first player from the Netherlands Antilles to have played in Malta. Siberie signed a contract with FC Dordrecht (Dutch second division) for the 2008–09 season.

== International career ==
Siberie made his debut for the Netherlands Antilles national team in a January 2004 in a friendly match against Suriname. He then played in all four World Cup qualifying matches they played later that year.

In 2011 Siberie begin playing with Curaçao national football team which replaced Netherlands Antilles on international level.

He represented Seborga in their first international match against Sealand, scoring one goal in a 3–2 defeat.
