= Romana FC =

- Full name: Romana Futbol Club
- Dissolved: 2014
- Ground: Complejo Deportivo La Romana, La Romana
- Capacity: 3,000
- Chairman: Valentin Pinales
- Manager: Claudio Parrella
- League: Primera División de Republica Dominicana
Home colours	Away colours

Romana Fútbol Club was a football team based in La Romana, Dominican Republic that played until 2014 in the defunct Primera División de Republica Dominicana.

The team disappeared in 2014 following the professionalization of the Dominican football. A new club was created in La Romana that year, called Delfines del Este FC that from 2015 competes in the Liga Dominicana de Fútbol.

== Stadium ==
The team played at the 3000 capacity Complejo Deportivo La Romana.

== Last staff ==
- Head Coach: (Venezuela) Claudio Parrella
- Assistant Coach: (Argentina) Gustavo Gimondo
- Physical trainer: (Dominican Republic) Juan Alberto Reyes
- Goalkeeper trainer: (Dominican Republic) Robert Gomez
