= Evan James (soccer) =

Canadian soccer player (born 1990)

Personal information
- Date of birth: 19 June 1990 (age 36)
- Place of birth: Mississauga, Ontario, Canada
- Height: 1.80 m (5 ft 11 in)
- Position: Forward

Team information
- Current team: Oakville Blue Devils

Youth career
- Mississauga SC
- 2004–2008: Oakville SC

College career
Years	Team	Apps	(Gls)
2008–2011	Charlotte 49ers	83	(21)

Senior career*
Years	Team	Apps	(Gls)
2011	Hamilton FC	8	(2)
2012	Montreal Impact	0	(0)
2013	K–W United	14	(4)
2013	Astros Vasas	6	(5)
2014	Tonbridge Angels	4	(1)
2014	Kraft	6	(2)
2015	Marienlyst		
2015	Sigma FC	1	(3)
2018	Master's Futbol	9	(0)
2019–	Oakville Blue Devils	20	(10)

International career^{‡}
2011–2012	Canada U23	4	(1)
2012–2013	Canada	2	(0)
- * Club domestic league appearances and goals as of 31 December 2021 ‡ National team caps and goals as of 29 January 2013

Evan James (born 19 June 1990) is a Canadian soccer player who plays for Oakville Blue Devils as a forward.

== Club career ==
James played 25 games for the Charlotte 49ers in 2011, and was a starter for 23 games. He totaled five goals and seven assists. In 2011, he was named to the All-Atlantic 10 First Team and the NSCAA All-Mid-Atlantic Region First Team. In 2008, he was named to the Atlantic 10 All-Rookie team. James played club soccer for the Oakville SC for 4 years prior to joining the Charlotte program. He won the U21 Ontario Cup with Oakville.

While in college, James appeared for USL PDL club Hamilton FC Rage in 2011, making eight appearances and scoring two goals.

James was selected 1st overall in the 2012 MLS Supplemental Draft and signed by the Montreal Impact on 1 March 2012 He was released by Montreal on 2 November 2012.

After his release he returned to the PDL to play with K–W United FC.

After the conclusion of the PDL season he signed with Astros Vasas of the Canadian Soccer League, where he recorded 5 goals.

In 2014, he went abroad to England to sign with Tonbridge Angels F.C. in the Conference South League. That season, he made four appearances, scoring one goal.

In 2014, James signed with Finnish Kakkonen side Kraft. He made six appearances that season, scoring two goals.

In 2015, he signed with BK Marienlyst in the Danish 2nd Division.

In June 2015, James returned to Canada and signed with League1 Ontario side Sigma FC. He scored a hat-trick on his debut on 4 June 2015.

In 2018, James played for League1 Ontario side Master's Futbol and made nine appearances that season.

In 2019, James signed with Oakville Blue Devils.

== International career ==
James made his debut for the Canada U23 national team in 2012.

James made his senior team debut on 26 January 2013 in a friendly against Denmark as a second half sub for Dwayne De Rosario, the game ended as a 4–0 defeat.

== Honours ==
University of North Carolina at Charlotte

- Atlantic 10 Conference All Rookie Team: 2008
