= Amir Waithe =

Panamanian footballer (born 1989)

Personal information
- Full name: Amir Alberto Waithe Nuñez
- Date of birth: 27 November 1989 (age 36)
- Place of birth: Panama City, Panama
- Height: 1.75 m (5 ft 9 in)
- Position: Forward

Team information
- Current team: Plaza Amador
- Number: 27

Senior career*
Years	Team	Apps	(Gls)
2009–2014	San Francisco	99	(11)
2015–2016	Tauro	50	(14)
2016–2017	Carmelita	34	(10)
2017	Tauro	17	(2)
2018	Carmelita	23	(3)
2019–	Plaza Amador	7	(2)

International career
2010–2012	Panama	8	(2)
- * Club domestic league appearances and goals as of 14:55, 23 September 2019 (UTC)

Amir Alberto Waithe Nuñez (born 27 November 1989) is a Panamanian football player, most recently playing for Liga Panameña de Fútbol club Plaza Amador.

== Club career ==
He started his career at San Francisco and in February 2011 was apparently sent on loan to Costa Rican giants Alajuelense, only to return to Panama 12 days later after Liga decided his trial period was not successful.

In January 2012, he returned from abroad again to San Francisco after he failed a trial at Slovak club FK Senica who appeared only eager to sign compatriot Rolando Blackburn. Waithe did not renew his contract with San Francisco in December 2014 and left the club after 10 seasons and winning three league titles. He then scored the first goal of the 2015 Clausura season for Tauro in a 1-1 draw against his former club San Francisco.

== International career ==
Waithe made his debut for Panama in March 2010 friendly match against Venezuela and has, as of 15 August 2015, earned a total of 7 caps, scoring 2 goals. He represented his country in 2 FIFA World Cup qualification matches.

=== International goals ===
Scores and results list Panama's goal tally first.

#	Date	Venue	Opponent	Score	Result	Competition
1	7 October 2011	Windsor Park, Roseau, Dominica	Dominica	1–0	5–0	2014 FIFA World Cup qualification
2	7 October 2011	Windsor Park, Roseau, Dominica	Dominica	5–0	5–0	2014 FIFA World Cup qualification
