= Paul E. Joseph Stadium =

Stadium in St. Croix, US Virgin Islands

- Interactive map of Paul E. Joseph Stadium
- Full name: Paul E. Joseph Stadium
- Location: Frederiksted, St. Croix, United States Virgin Islands
- Coordinates: 17°43′04″N 64°52′57″W
- Capacity: 5,000
- Surface: Grass

Construction
- Demolished: 2015

Tenant
- United States Virgin Islands national soccer team

Paul E. Joseph Stadium was a multi-use stadium in Frederiksted, St. Croix, United States Virgin Islands.

It was used mostly for soccer matches, as well as baseball and American football. It hosted some home matches for the United States Virgin Islands national soccer team.

The stadium held 5,000 spectators.

== History ==
The stadium bears the name of St. Croix legislator, editor, publisher, and civil rights activist Paul E. Joseph, who died in 1966. It was named after Joseph in 1964. The stadium also hosted the Crucian Christmas Carnival, St. Croix's and Frederiksted's largest event. On March 31, 1967 it hosted the first MLB exhibition game played in the Virgin Islands when the New York Yankees played the Boston Red Sox.

=== Cricket ===
The stadium had also hosted cricket matches, playing host to a single first-class match between West Indies B and Guyana in 2003. This was the first time first-class cricket had been played in the U.S. Virgin Islands.

== Demolition and Renovation ==
Demolition of Paul E. Joseph Stadium began in January 2015 and was stopped days later—midway through demolition—mired in politics and finance. The half-demolished wreckage remains a blight on St. Croix and an economic impediment in developing both St. Croix and Frederiksted.

Because the previous administration put together plans for the renovation of the Paul E. Joseph Stadium in Frederiksted "in haste," Mapp said, he has halted the project. The current plan would build a $10 million stadium for $20 million. The administration will meet with the contractor to rewrite the contract or terminate the project if an agreement can't be reached, he said.
