= 2020–21 Cayman Islands Premier League =

Cayman Islands Premier League
- Season: 2020–21
- Dates: 25 September 2020 – 28 February 2021
- Champions: Scholars
- Relegated: Roma United
- Matches: 90
- Goals: 270 (3 per match)
- Biggest home win: Scholars 5-1 Elite (4 October 2020); Scholars 4–0 George Town (22 November 2020)
- Biggest away win: Roma United 0–6 Scholars (10 October 2020); Bodden Town 0–6 Scholars (1 November 2020)
- Highest scoring: Future 4-5 Roma United (22 November 2020)

The 2020–21 Cayman Islands Premier League season was the 42nd edition of the top tier Cayman Islands Premier League football competition in the Cayman Islands. The season began on 25 September 2020 and concluded on 28 February 2021. Bodden Town were the defending champions from the previous season. Following the previous season, two teams, Alliance FC and North Side SC were relegated to the First Division, reducing the number of teams in the league to ten.

On 13 February, Scholars successfully defended its 2019 title in the 2020 final for its 13th successive title.

== League table ==
Pos	Team	Pld	W	D	L	GF	GA	GD	Pts	Qualification or relegation
1	Scholars International (C)	18	14	3	1	51	7	+44	45	Caribbean Club Shield
2	Bodden Town	18	10	5	3	25	17	+8	35	
3	Future	18	9	5	4	32	26	+6	32	
4	Academy	18	9	3	6	33	23	+10	30	
5	Latinos	18	9	2	7	26	24	+2	29	
6	Elite	18	8	5	5	22	23	−1	29	
7	East End United	18	6	3	9	23	32	−9	21	
8	George Town	18	5	3	10	14	25	−11	18	
9	Sunset	18	3	1	14	18	37	−19	10	Qualification to relegation play-off
10	Roma United (R)	18	2	0	16	17	47	−30	6	Relegated

Source: Soccerway
(C) Champions; (R) Relegated

== Clubs' stadiums ==
Team	Location	Stadium	Capacity
Academy			
Bodden Town	Bodden Town	Haig Bodden Stadium	1,500
East End United	East End	Donovan Rankine Stadium	1,500
Elite			
Future			
George Town	George Town	T.E. McField Sports Centre	2,500
Latinos			
Roma United			
Scholars International		Ed Bush Stadium	2,500
Sunset	George Town	T.E. McField Sports Centre	2,500
