= 2025–26 Cayman Islands Premier League =

CIFA Premier League
- Season: 2025–26
- Dates: 4 October 2025 – 31 May 2026
- Champions: Elite
- Relegated: Future; Latinos; Cayman Brac
- Caribbean Club Shield: Elite; Academy
- Top goalscorer: Christopher Brown (21)
- Biggest home win: East End 11-1 Latinos (31 May 2026); 345 10–0 Cayman Brac (5 October 2025)
- Biggest away win: Cayman Brac 1–9 Academy (25 October 2025); Future 1–9 Academy (3 May 2026)
- Highest scoring: East End 11-1 Latinos (31 May 2026)

The 2025–26 CIFA Premier League season was the 47th edition of the top tier Cayman Islands Premier League football competition in the Cayman Islands. The season began on 4 October 2025 and concluded on 31 May 2026. Bodden Town were the defending champions from the previous season. Elite SC were the two-time defending champions, and successfully three-peated. Elite also completed the double during the season, by winning the CIFA President's Cup.

== Table ==
Pos	Team	Pld	W	D	L	GF	GA	GD	Pts	Qualification or relegation
1	Elite (C)	22	17	4	1	70	12	+58	55	Qualification for the CFU Club Shield
2	Academy	22	18	0	4	82	21	+61	54	
3	Scholars International	22	15	2	5	61	20	+41	47	
4	Bodden Town	22	13	4	5	55	29	+26	43	
5	345	22	10	5	7	47	32	+15	35	
6	Cayman Athletic	22	11	1	10	38	37	+1	34	
7	Sunset	22	9	3	10	41	45	−4	30	
8	Tigers	22	8	4	10	39	43	−4	28	
9	East End United	22	6	3	13	42	71	−29	21	
10	Future (R)	22	5	2	15	26	72	−46	17	Relegation to Cayman Islands First Division
11	Latinos (R)	22	3	1	18	25	76	−51	10	Relegation to Cayman Islands First Division
12	Cayman Brac (R)	22	2	1	19	13	81	−68	7	Relegation to Cayman Islands First Division

Source: RSSSF
Rules for classification: At end of season: 1) Points; 2) Goal difference; 3) Goals scored; 4) Head-to-head points; 5) Head-to-head goal difference; 6) Head-to-head goals scored; 7) Head-to-head away goals scored; 8) Play-off match or matches; 9) Penalty shoot-out (if the play-off match or matches end in a draw)
(C) Champions; (R) Relegated
