= 2010–11 Cayman Islands Premier League =

Cayman Islands League
- Season: 2010–11
- Champions: Elite SC; 2nd title
- Relegated: East End United
- CFU Club Championship: Elite SC; George Town SC
- Matches: 56
- Goals: 214 (3.82 per match)
- Top goalscorer: (Cayman Islands) Dwayne Wright (18 goals)
- Biggest home win: Bodden Town 6-1 Tigers
- Biggest away win: Bodden Town 1-7 Elite
- Highest scoring: Bodden Town 1-7 Elite; Elite 5-3 Scholars International; Future 4-4 Tigers
- Longest winning run: Elite SC (8 matches)
- Longest unbeaten run: Elite SC (14 matches)
- Longest winless run: East End United (7 matches)
- Longest losing run: East End United (5 matches)

The 2010–11 Cayman Islands Premier League season was the 32nd edition of top tier Cayman Islands Premier League football competition in the Cayman Islands. It began on 10 October 2010 and ended on 30 April 2011.

Scholars International unsuccessfully defended its 2010 title. Elite SC successfully pursued its successive 2nd title in the 2011 final.

== Teams ==
Sunset FC were relegated to the Cayman Islands First Division after finishing eighth place in last season's competition. Taking their place in the competition were the champions of the First Division, East End United.

Team	Home city	Home ground
Bodden Town FC	Bodden Town	Bodden Town Stadium
East End United	East End	Donovan Rankine Stadium
Elite SC	West Bay	
Future FC	West Bay	
George Town SC	George Town	The Annex
Roma United	George Town	
Scholars International	West Bay	Ed Bush Stadium
Tigers FC	George Town	

== Standings ==
Pos	Team	Pld	W	D	L	GF	GA	GD	Pts	Qualification or relegation
1	Elite SC (C)	21	14	4	3	61	33	+28	46	2012 CFU Club Championship
2	George Town SC	21	10	5	6	37	30	+7	35	2012 CFU Club Championship
3	Bodden Town FC	21	9	5	7	43	37	+6	32	
4	Scholars International	21	9	3	9	37	27	+10	30	
5	Roma United	21	10	0	11	32	35	−3	30	
6	Future FC	21	7	4	10	31	44	−13	25	
7	Tigers FC	21	8	1	12	40	52	−12	19 (Note: Tigers FC were docked 6 points.)	Relegation playoffs
8	East End United (R)	21	4	4	13	33	56	−23	16	Relegation to Cayman Islands First Division

Source: soccerway.com
Rules for classification: 1) points; 2) goal difference; 3) number of goals scored.
(C) Champions; (R) Relegated

=== Promotion/relegation playoff ===
The 7th place team in this competition, Tigers FC, faced the runners up of the First Division, Academy SC, for a place in next season's competition.

4 May 2011
19:30 UTC−05:00

Tigers FC	–	Academy SC

The Annex, George Town

== Results ==
=== Regular home games ===
Home \ Away	BOD	EEU	ELI	FUT	GEO	RMU	SCI	TIG
Bodden Town FC		1–1	1–7	3–0	1–3	2–3	0–4	6–1
East End United	2–4		1–1	5–2	1–3	2–4	1–4	2–1
Elite SC	2–2	2–0		3–1	3–2	2–1	5–3	3–2
Future FC	0–0	4–2	0–5		1–1	0–2	2–1	4–4
George Town SC	3–3	1–3	1–3	1–1		0–1	2–1	1–2
Roma United	1–2	3–1	2–3	1–0	1–4		1–2	2–3
Scholars International	1–3	1–1	2–2	2–1	1–2	3–0		3–0
Tigers FC	3–2	4–2	0–2	1–2	0–1	0–2	0–2	

Source: soccerway.com
Legend: Blue = home team win; Yellow = draw; Red = away team win.

=== Additional home games ===
Home \ Away	BOD	EEU	ELI	FUT	GEO	RMU	SCI	TIG
Bodden Town FC			3–4	3–0			1–1	
East End United	0–2		0–3			1–3		3–7
Elite SC						0–1	1–4	
Future FC		5–3	1–0		3–4			1–3
George Town SC	1–0	1–1	2–2			1–2	1–0	
Roma United	0–1			0–2				1–4
Scholars International		0–1		0–1		2–1		0–1
Tigers FC	0–3		4–8		0–2			

Source: soccerway.com
Legend: Blue = home team win; Yellow = draw; Red = away team win.

== Season statistics ==
=== Top goalscorers ===
Position	Player	Club	Goals
1	(Cayman Islands) Dwayne Wright	Elite	18
2	(Cayman Islands) Alex Belcher	Elite	17
3	(Cayman Islands) Nahun Rodriguez	Tigers	13
4	(Cayman Islands) Tex Whitelocke	George Town	11
5	(Cayman Islands) Jairo Sanchez	Elite	11
6	(Cayman Islands) Arvid Harris	Bodden Town	10
7	(Cayman Islands) Ericksen Brown	Scholars International	10
8	(Cayman Islands) James Ebanks	Future	10
9	(Cayman Islands) Denver Barnes	Future	8
10	(Cayman Islands) Derrin Ebanks	Elite	8

Source: CIFA

== Awards ==
=== CIFA Player of the Month ===
Month	Player	Club
October	(Cayman Islands) Alex Belcher	Elite
November		
December		
January		
February		
March		
April		
May		
