= 2016–17 Cayman Islands Premier League =

Cayman Islands Premier League
- Season: 2016–17
- Champions: Bodden Town FC (3rd title)
- Relegated: Cayman Athletic SC
- CFU Club Championship: Bodden Town FC; Elite SC
- Matches: 84
- Goals: 232 (2.76 per match)
- Biggest home win: Scholars International 4–0 Sunset
- Biggest away win: Sunset 0–6 Roma United
- Highest scoring: Latinos FC 5–3 Academy SC

The 2016–17 Cayman Islands Premier League season was the 38th edition of top tier Cayman Islands Premier League football competition in the Cayman Islands. It began on 2 October 2016.

Scholars International unsuccessfully defended its 10th successive 2016 title. Bodden Town FC successfully pursued its 3rd successive title in the 2017 final.

== Clubs ==
George Town SC finished 8th at the conclusion of last season and were relegated. Taking their place in this season is Latinos FC.

Sunset FC finished 7th at the conclusion of last season and had to participate in a play-off against North Side SC, which Sunset won 3–0. Therefore, they remain in the Premier League for this season.

Team	Home city	Home ground
Academy SC	George Town	T.E. McField Sports Centre
Bodden Town FC	Bodden Town	Bodden Town Stadium
Cayman Athletic SC	George Town	T.E. McField Sports Centre
Elite SC	West Bay	Ed Bush Sports Complex
Latinos FC	George Town	Annex Stadium
Roma United	George Town	T.E. McField Sports Centre
Scholars International	West Bay	Ed Bush Sports Complex
Sunset FC	George Town	T.E. McField Sports Centre

== Table ==
Pos	Team	Pld	W	D	L	GF	GA	GD	Pts	Qualification or relegation
1	Bodden Town (C)	21	15	2	4	33	21	+12	47	Caribbean Club Shield
2	Elite	21	10	6	5	39	24	+15	36	
3	Scholars International	21	8	7	6	29	16	+13	31	
4	Academy	21	9	4	8	28	29	−1	31	
5	Latinos	21	5	9	7	27	27	0	24	
6	Roma United (Note: Roma United were deducted 3 points.)	21	8	3	10	28	31	−3	24	
7	Sunset	21	7	1	13	26	45	−19	22	Relegation playoffs
8	Cayman Athletic (R)	21	4	4	13	22	39	−17	16	Relegation to Cayman Islands First Division

Source: https://www.rsssf.org/tablesc/cayman2017.html
(C) Champions;
(R) Relegated

=== Promotion/relegation playoff ===
The 7th place team in this competition, Sunset, will face the runners-up of the First Division, Cayman Brac, for a place in next season's competition.

Sunset	5–0	Cayman Brac

Sunset retained their place in the competition.

== Results ==
=== Regular Home Games ===
Home \ Away	ASC	BTFC	CASC	ESC	LFC	RMU	SCI	SFC
Academy SC		1–3	2–2	1–4	2–3	2–1	0–1	3–1
Bodden Town FC	1–0		2–1	0–3	1–0	2–1	0–0	1–0
Cayman Athletic SC	0–1	1–2		0–3	2–1	2–2	0–4	1–2
Elite SC	1–1	1–2	0–1		0–0	3–1	1–0	2–4
Latinos FC	5–3	2–4	0–1	1–1		2–0	2–2	1–1
Roma United	0–2	0–0	1–5	1–3	1–1		1–2	1–2
Scholars International	1–2	2–0	1–1	2–2	0–0	0–1		1–0
Sunset FC	0–2	1–3	4–2	1–2	2–4	0–3	0–4	

Source: Soccerway
Legend: Blue = home team win; Yellow = draw; Red = away team win.

=== Additional Home Games ===
Home \ Away	ASC	BTFC	CASC	ESC	LFC	RMU	SCI	SFC
Academy SC				0–0	0–0	1–2		
Bodden Town FC	3–0		1–0		2–1			
Cayman Athletic SC	1–2			0–3			1–3	
Elite SC		2–4			3–2		1–1	1–2
Latinos FC			1–1			0–1	0–0	1–0
Roma United		1–0	2–0	0–3				
Scholars International	0–1	0–1				1–2		4–0
Sunset FC	0–2	4–1	2–0			0–6		

Source: Soccerway
Legend: Blue = home team win; Yellow = draw; Red = away team win.
