= 2018–19 Cayman Islands Premier League =

Cayman Islands Premier League
- Season: 2018–19
- Champions: Scholars International
- Caribbean Club Shield: Scholars International

The 2018–19 Cayman Islands Premier League season was the 40th edition of top tier Cayman Islands Premier League football competition in the Cayman Islands. The season began on 3 November 2018. The season ended on 17 March 2019. Many league games took place in front of dozens of spectators.

Scholars International successfully defended its 2018 title in the 2019 final for its 12th successive title.

== League table ==
Pos	Team	Pld	W	D	L	GF	GA	GD	Pts	Qualification or relegation
1	Scholars International (C)	13	10	2	1	54	5	+49	32	Caribbean Club Shield
2	Bodden Town	13	10	2	1	47	8	+39	32	
3	Academy	13	8	4	1	50	12	+38	28	
4	Elite	13	8	3	2	56	16	+40	27	
5	Future	13	8	2	3	28	13	+15	26	
6	Roma United	13	7	4	2	35	14	+21	25	
7	Latinos	13	5	3	5	28	20	+8	18	
8	George Town	13	4	4	5	35	31	+4	16	
9	Sunset	13	4	3	6	27	26	+1	15	
10	Cayman Athletic	13	4	1	8	25	32	−7	13	
11	East End United	13	4	0	9	15	56	−41	12	
12	North Side	13	2	1	10	16	45	−29	7	
13	Tigers	13	1	1	11	9	66	−57	4	
14	Alliance	13	0	0	13	9	96	−87	0	

Source: Soccerway
(C) Champions

The 4 November match between North Side and Tigers was abandoned following a fight between the two clubs, causing both clubs to be awarded a 0–3 loss.
