= 2009–10 Cayman Islands Premier League =

Cayman Islands League
- Season: 2009–10
- Champions: Scholars International; 7th title
- Relegated: Sunset FC
- CFU Club Championship: Bodden Town
- Matches: 20
- Goals: 269 (13.45 per match)
- Top goalscorer: (Cayman Islands) Tex Whitelocke (13 goals)

The 2009–10 Cayman Islands Premier League season was the 31st edition of top tier Cayman Islands Premier League football competition in the Cayman Islands. It began on 27 September 2009 and ended on 1 May 2010.

Elite unsuccessfully defended its 2009 title. Scholars International successfully defended its pursuit of a 7th title in the 2010 final.

== Teams ==
Latinos FC were relegated to the Cayman Islands First Division after failing to meet certain requirements of the football association instead of Roma United. Taking their place in the competition were the champions of the First Division, Bodden Town FC.

| Team | Home city | Home ground |
|---|---|---|
| Bodden Town FC | Bodden Town | Bodden Town Stadium |
| Elite SC | West Bay | |
| Future FC | West Bay | |
| George Town SC | George Town, Cayman Islands | The Annex |
| Roma United | George Town, Cayman Islands | |
| Scholars International | West Bay | Ed Bush Stadium |
| Sunset FC | George Town, Cayman Islands | The Annex |
| Tigers FC | George Town, Cayman Islands | |

== Standings ==
| Pos | Team | Pld | W | D | L | GF | GA | GD | Pts | Qualification or relegation |
|---|---|---|---|---|---|---|---|---|---|---|
| 1 | Scholars International (C) | 20 | 12 | 4 | 4 | 50 | 27 | +23 | 40 | 2011 CFU Club Championship |
| 2 | Bodden Town FC | 20 | 9 | 7 | 4 | 42 | 31 | +11 | 34 | 2011 CFU Club Championship |
| 3 | George Town SC | 20 | 9 | 6 | 5 | 37 | 29 | +8 | 33 | |
| 4 | Tigers FC | 20 | 9 | 2 | 9 | 39 | 39 | 0 | 29 | |
| 5 | Elite SC | 20 | 6 | 6 | 8 | 34 | 39 | −5 | 24 | |
| 6 | Future FC | 20 | 6 | 6 | 8 | 22 | 29 | −7 | 24 | |
| 7 | Roma United | 20 | 6 | 2 | 12 | 25 | 40 | −15 | 20 | Relegation playoffs |
| 8 | Sunset FC (R) | 20 | 4 | 5 | 11 | 20 | 35 | −15 | 17 | Relegation to Cayman Islands First Division |

Source: caymanactive.com
Rules for classification: 1) points; 2) goal difference; 3) number of goals scored.
(C) Champions; (R) Relegated

== Relegation playoff ==
1 May 2010

| Roma United | 3 – 2 | Academy |

== Season statistics ==
=== Top goalscorers ===
| Position | Player | Club | Goals |
|---|---|---|---|
| 1 | Tex Whitelocke | George Town | 13 |
| 2 | Fabian Malcolm | Scholars International | 10 |
| 3 | Jose Luis Bush | Tigers | 9 |
| 4 | Nahun Rodriguez | Scholars International | 9 |
| 5 | Donovan Godet | Elite | 8 |
| 6 | Kiegel Atkinson | Tigers, Roma United | 8 |
| 7 | Michael Ebanks | Future | 8 |
| 8 | Carlos Powery | Tigers | 7 |
| 9 | Charlo McLean | Bodden Town | 7 |
| 10 | Dwayne Wright | Roma United | 7 |

Source: caymanactive.com
