= 2011–12 Cayman Islands Premier League =

Cayman Islands Premier League
- Season: 2011–12
- Matches: 44
- Goals: 131 (2.98 per match)
- Top goalscorer: (Cayman Islands) Dwayne Wright (20 goals)
- Biggest home win: Elite 10–1 Cayman A.
- Biggest away win: Tigers 1–4 Scholars I. Roma United 0–3 George Town
- Highest scoring: Elite 10–1 Cayman A.

The 2011–12 Cayman Islands Premier League season was the 33rd season of top tier Cayman Islands Premier League football competition in the Cayman Islands. It began on 18 September 2011 and ended on 28 April 2012.

Elite SC unsuccessfully defended its second successive 2011 title.

== Teams ==
East End United were relegated to the Cayman Islands First Division after finishing eighth place in last season's competition. Taking their place in the competition were the champions of the First Division, Cayman Athletic SC.

Another spot in the league was available through a promotion/relegation playoff between the 7th-place finisher in the Premier League, Tigers FC, and the runners-up of the First Division, Academy SC. Tigers won this playoff and remained in the competition.

== Locations ==
Location of teams in the 2011–12 Cayman Islands Premier League

Team	Home city	Home ground
Bodden Town FC	Bodden Town	Bodden Town Stadium
Cayman Athletic SC	George Town	
Elite SC	West Bay	
Future FC	West Bay	
George Town SC	George Town	The Annex
Roma United	George Town	
Scholars International	West Bay	Ed Bush Stadium
Tigers FC	George Town	

== Standings ==
Pos	Team	Pld	W	D	L	GF	GA	GD	Pts	Qualification or relegation
1	Scholars International (C)	21	14	6	1	49	15	+34	48	
2	Elite SC	21	13	7	1	49	16	+33	46	
3	Bodden Town FC	21	13	3	5	56	28	+28	42	
4	George Town SC	21	10	5	6	33	27	+6	35	
5	Tigers FC	21	7	5	9	29	37	−8	26	
6	Cayman Athletic SC	21	4	5	12	23	45	−22	17	
7	Roma United	21	3	2	16	14	49	−35	11	Relegation playoffs
8	Future FC	21	1	5	15	14	50	−36	8	Relegation to Cayman Islands First Division

Updated to match(es) played on 7 May 2012. Source: soccerway.com
Rules for classification: 1) points; 2) goal difference; 3) number of goals scored.
(C) Champions

=== Promotion/relegation playoff ===
The 7th place team in this competition will face the runners up of the First Division for a place in next season's competition.

TBA 2012
TBA UTC−05:00

Roma United	–	TBD

The Annex, George Town

== Results ==
=== Regular home games ===
Home \ Away	BOD	CAT	ELI	FUT	GEO	RMU	SCI	TIG
Bodden Town FC		3–0	0–2	6–1	4–0	4–0		5–0
Cayman Athletic SC	1–2			0–2	1–2	3–1	2–2	
Elite SC	4–2	10–1				2–0	0–0	3–1
Future FC		0–0	1–2		0–1	1–1	0–0	1–3
George Town SC	1–2		1–2	3–2			1–3	2–1
Roma United		0–2	1–0	2–0	0–3		0–2	
Scholars International	3–2	5–2	2–2		2–1	4–0		
Tigers FC	3–3	1–0	1–2	2–1	1–1	1–1	1–4	

Updated to match(es) played on 18 December 2011. Source: soccerway.com
Legend: Blue = home team win; Yellow = draw; Red = away team win.

=== Additional home games ===
Home \ Away	BOD	CAT	ELI	FUT	GEO	RMU	SCI	TIG
Bodden Town FC								
Cayman Athletic SC								
Elite SC								
Future FC								
George Town SC								
Roma United								
Scholars International								
Tigers FC								

Updated to match(es) played on pre-season. Source: soccerway.com
Legend: Blue = home team win; Yellow = draw; Red = away team win.
