= 2015–16 Cayman Islands Premier League =

Cayman Islands Premier League
- Season: 2015–16
- Champions: Scholars International (10th title)
- Relegated: George Town
- CFU Club Championship: Scholars International; Elite
- Matches: 84
- Goals: 269 (3.2 per match)
- Biggest home win: Elite 5–0 Academy
- Biggest away win: Cayman Athletic 0–6 Scholars International
- Highest scoring: Sunset 1–6 Scholars International

The 2015–16 Cayman Islands Premier League season was the 37th season of top tier Cayman Islands Premier League football competition in the Cayman Islands. It began on 18 October 2015 and will end on 29 May 2016.

Scholars International successfully defended its 9th successive 2015 title in the 2016 final.

== Clubs ==
Cayman Brac FC finished 8th at the conclusion of last season and were relegated. Taking their place in this season was Academy SC.

Roma United finished 7th at the conclusion of last season and had to participate in a play-off, which they won. Therefore, they remain in the Premier League for this season.

Team	Home city	Home ground
Academy SC	George Town	T.E. McField Sports Centre
Bodden Town FC	Bodden Town	Bodden Town Stadium
Cayman Athletic SC	George Town	T.E. McField Sports Centre
Elite SC	West Bay	Ed Bush Sports Complex
George Town SC	George Town	T.E. McField Sports Centre
Roma United	George Town	T.E. McField Sports Centre
Scholars International	West Bay	Ed Bush Sports Complex
Sunset FC	George Town	T.E. McField Sports Centre

== Table ==
Pos	Team	Pld	W	D	L	GF	GA	GD	Pts	Qualification or relegation
1	Scholars International (C)	21	16	3	2	55	15	+40	51	Champions, 2017 Caribbean Club Championship
2	Elite	21	14	4	3	48	25	+23	46	2017 Caribbean Club Championship
3	Academy	21	8	3	10	34	35	−1	27	
4	Bodden Town	21	7	5	9	31	33	−2	26	
5	Cayman Athletic	21	6	6	9	33	43	−10	24	
6	Roma United	21	7	3	11	23	37	−14	24	
7	Sunset	21	5	5	11	24	45	−21	20	Relegation playoffs
8	George Town (R)	21	4	5	12	21	36	−15	17	Relegation to Cayman Islands First Division

Updated to match(es) played on 28 May 2016.
Source: https://www.rsssf.org/tablesc/cayman2016.html
(C) Champions;
(R) Relegated

=== Promotion/relegation playoff ===
The 7th place team in this competition will face the runners-up of the First Division for a place in next season's competition.

Sunset	3–0	North Side SC

== Results ==
=== Regular Home Games ===
Home \ Away	ASC	BTFC	CASC	ESC	GTSC	RMU	SCI	SFC
Academy SC		0–4	5–1	4–1	2–1	3–2	1–3	2–2
Bodden Town FC	3–1		2–2	0–0	2–2	3–2	0–3	0–1
Cayman Athletic SC	3–2	2–0		2–3	3–2	2–1	2–2	2–2
Elite SC	5–0	0–3	1–0		2–1	3–0	0–0	4–2
George Town SC	1–4	1–1	1–0	2–2		0–3	0–2	1–1
Roma United	0–0	1–0	1–1	1–4	0–0		0–1	0–1
Scholars International	1–0	1–0	5–1	3–3	2–1	4–0		4–0
Sunset FC	1–1	0–2	2–0	1–4	0–3	1–3	0–3	

Source: RSSSF
Legend: Blue = home team win; Yellow = draw; Red = away team win.

=== Additional Home Games ===
Home \ Away	ASC	BTFC	CASC	ESC	GTSC	RMU	SCI	SFC
Academy SC		3–0	0–2				0–1	
Bodden Town FC			2–2	1–3	1–3	1–2	3–2	3–2
Cayman Athletic SC				2–3			0–6	1–1
Elite SC	1–0				1–0			
George Town SC	1–3		1–0					0–2
Roma United	1–0		1–5	0–5	2–0		2–1	1–2
Scholars International				2–1	3–0			
Sunset FC	1–3			1–2			1–6	

Source: RSSSF
Legend: Blue = home team win; Yellow = draw; Red = away team win.
