= 2017–18 Cayman Islands Premier League =

Cayman Islands Premier League
- Season: 2017–18
- Champions: Scholars International
- Caribbean Club Shield: Scholars International

The 2017–18 Cayman Islands Premier League season was the 39th edition of top tier Cayman Islands Premier League football competition in the Cayman Islands. It began on 14 October 2017 and ended on 8 April 2018.

Scholars International successfully defended its 2017 title in the 2018 final for an 11th successive title.

== Standings ==
Pos	Team	Pld	W	D	L	GF	GA	GD	Pts	Qualification or relegation
1	Scholars International	13	10	2	1	39	10	+29	32	Caribbean Club Shield
2	Roma United	13	10	1	2	36	8	+28	31	
3	Elite	13	8	3	2	43	12	+31	27	
4	Latinos	13	7	5	1	38	16	+22	26	
5	Academy	13	8	1	4	43	26	+17	25	
6	Sunset	13	8	1	4	29	17	+12	25	
7	Future	13	5	4	4	17	21	−4	19	
8	Bodden Town	13	6	1	6	21	27	−6	19	
9	Cayman Athletic	13	5	3	5	33	26	+7	18	
10	George Town	13	4	2	7	26	33	−7	14	
11	Cayman Brac	13	1	3	9	12	36	−24	6	
12	Tigers	13	1	3	9	18	56	−38	6	
13	North Side	13	1	2	10	15	40	−25	5	
14	East End United	13	1	1	11	9	51	−42	4	
