= 2011–12 in Cayman Islands football =

The 2011–12 season is the 20th season of competitive football in the Cayman Islands.

== National teams ==
The home team or the team that is designated as the home team is listed in the left column; the away team is in the right column.

Win Draw Loss

=== Senior ===
==== 2014 FIFA World Cup qualification ====
2 September 2011 Group A	Suriname	1 – 0	Cayman Islands	Paramaribo, Suriname
18:00 UTC-03	Mando 11' (pen.)	(Report)		Stadium: André Kamperveen Stadion; Attendance: 1,000; Referee: Adrian Skeete (Barbados)

6 September 2011 Group A	Cayman Islands	1 – 4	El Salvador	George Town, Cayman Islands
19:30 UTC-05	Ebanks 73' (pen.)	(Report)	Bautista 49'; Anaya 62', 80'; García 90+3'	Stadium: Truman Bodden Stadium; Attendance: 2,200; Referee: Elmar Rodas (Guatemala)

7 October 2011 Group A	Cayman Islands	0 – 1	Suriname	George Town, Cayman Islands
19:30 UTC-05		(Report)	Drenthe 57'	Stadium: Truman Bodden Stadium; Attendance: 2,100; Referee: Edvin Jurisevic (United States)

11 October 2011 Group A	El Salvador	4 – 0	Cayman Islands	San Salvador, El Salvador
19:30 UTC-06	Turcios 6'; Purdy 13'; J. Alas 45'; Sosa 88' (pen.)	(Report)		Stadium: Estadio Cuscatlán; Attendance: 17,570; Referee: Hugo Cruz Alvarado (Costa Rica)

11 November 2011 Group A	Dominican Republic	4 – 0	Cayman Islands	San Cristóbal, Dominican Republic
15:00 UTC-04	Navarro 17'; Ozuna 38'; Rodriguez 64'; Morillo 79'	(Report)		Stadium: Estadio Panamericano; Attendance: 1,000; Referee: Jose Guerrero (Nicaragua)

14 November 2011 Group A	Cayman Islands	1 – 1	Dominican Republic	George Town, Cayman Islands
19:30 UTC-05	M. Ebanks 72'	(Report)	García 41'	Stadium: Truman Bodden Stadium; Attendance: 1,750; Referee: James Matthew (St. Kitts and Nevis)

=== Under-23 ===
==== 2012 CONCACAF Olympic qualification ====
3 August 2011 Group A	Suriname	5 – 0	Cayman Islands	Paramaribo, Suriname
18:00 UTC-03	Perk 15'; Rijssel 20', 46'; Hernandez 34' (o.g.); Drenthe 89'	(Report)		Stadium: André Kamperveen Stadion; Attendance: 600; Referee: Valman Bedeau (Grenada)

5 August 2011 Group A	Jamaica	1 – 0	Jamaica	Paramaribo, Suriname
16:00 UTC-03	Adlam 14'	(Report)		Stadium: André Kamperveen Stadion; Attendance: 200; Referee: Trevor Taylor (Barbados)

7 August 2011 Group A	Cayman Islands	0 – 2	Saint Vincent and the Grenadines	Paramaribo, Suriname
15:00 UTC-03		(Report)	Stapleton 25'; Ebanks 29' (o.g.)	Stadium: André Kamperveen Stadion; Attendance: 350; Referee: Bryan Willett (Antigua and Barbuda)

== League tables ==
=== Cayman Islands Premier League ===
==== Table ====
Pos	Team	Pld	W	D	L	GF	GA	GD	Pts	Qualification or relegation
1	Scholars International (C)	21	14	6	1	49	15	+34	48	
2	Elite SC	21	13	7	1	49	16	+33	46	
3	Bodden Town FC	21	13	3	5	56	28	+28	42	
4	George Town SC	21	10	5	6	33	27	+6	35	
5	Tigers FC	21	7	5	9	29	37	−8	26	
6	Cayman Athletic SC	21	4	5	12	23	45	−22	17	
7	Roma United	21	3	2	16	14	49	−35	11	Relegation playoffs
8	Future FC	21	1	5	15	14	50	−36	8	Relegation to Cayman Islands First Division

Updated to match(es) played on 7 May 2012. Source: soccerway.com
Rules for classification: 1) points; 2) goal difference; 3) number of goals scored.
(C) Champions

== Cayman Islander clubs in international competitions ==
Club	Competition	Final round
Elite	2012 CFU Club Championship	First Round
George Town	2012 CFU Club Championship	Second Round

=== Elite SC ===
March 27, 2012 CFU Club Championship First Round	North Village Rams (Bermuda)	1 – 2	(Cayman Islands) Elite	George Town, Cayman Islands
19:30 UTC-05	Bean 60'	(Report)	Carter 13', 66'	Stadium: T.E. McField Sports Centre; Attendance: 1,700; Referee: Kevin Thomas (Jamaica)

March 29, 2012 CFU Club Championship First Round	Elite (Cayman Islands)	1 – 2	(Cayman Islands) George Town	George Town, Cayman Islands
19:30 UTC-05	Wright 5'	(Report)	Malcolm 40'; Cuevas-Ebanks 87'	Stadium: T.E. McField Sports Centre; Referee: Dwight Royal (Jamaica)

=== George Town SC ===
March 25, 2012 CFU Club Championship First Round	George Town (Cayman Islands)	0 – 0	(Bermuda) North Village Rams	George Town, Cayman Islands
19:00 UTC-05		(Report)		Stadium: T.E. McField Sports Centre; Attendance: 1,800; Referee: Dwight Royal (Jamaica)

March 29, 2012 CFU Club Championship First Round	Elite (Cayman Islands)	1 – 2	(Cayman Islands) George Town	George Town, Cayman Islands
19:30 UTC-05	Wright 5'	(Report)	Malcolm 40'; Cuevas-Ebanks 87'	Stadium: T.E. McField Sports Centre; Referee: Dwight Royal (Jamaica)

May 23, 2012 CFU Club Championship Second Round	Caledonia AIA (Trinidad and Tobago)	5 – 0	(Cayman Islands) George Town	George Town, Cayman Islands
19:30 UTC-05	Jorsling 47', 70'; Caesar 72', 76'; Smith 80'	(Report)		Stadium: T.E. McField Sports Centre; Attendance: 200; Referee: Caswell Cambridge (St. Vincent and the Grenadines)

May 25, 2012 CFU Club Championship Second Round	George Town (Cayman Islands)	0 – 8	Puerto Rico Islanders	George Town, Cayman Islands
19:30 UTC-05		(Report)	Ramos 4', 20'; Faña 22', 54', 56'; Elliott 27' (o.g.); Richardson 44'; Robinson 61' (o.g.)	Stadium: T.E. McField Sports Centre; Attendance: 300; Referee: Wilson da Costa (Bahamas)
