= 2014–15 Cayman Islands Premier League =

CIFA Premier League
- Season: 2014–15
- Matches: 48
- Goals: 155 (3.23 per match)
- Biggest home win: Elite 5–0 George Town
- Biggest away win: Cayman Brac 2–7 Cayman Athletic
- Highest scoring: Cayman Brac 2–7 Cayman Athletic
- Longest winning run: George Town (3)
- Longest unbeaten run: Bodden Town (6)
- Longest winless run: Cayman Brac; George Town (6)
- Longest losing run: Cayman Brac (5)
- All statistics correct as of 18 December 2014.

The 2014–15 Cayman Islands Premier League season was the 36th season of top tier Cayman Islands Premier League football competition in the Cayman Islands. It began on 13 September 2014 and ended on 3 May 2015.

Bodden Town FC are the reigning champions, coming off their second consecutive league title.

== Teams ==
Academy SC and North Side SC were each relegated to the Cayman Islands First Division after finishing in seventh and eighth place, respectively, in last season's competition. Roma United and Cayman Brac FC were each promoted from the First Division.

Team	Home city	Home ground
Bodden Town FC	Bodden Town	Bodden Town Stadium
Cayman Athletic SC	George Town	T.E. McField Sports Centre
Cayman Brac FC	Cayman Brac	Cayman Brac Stadium
Elite SC	West Bay	Ed Bush Sports Complex
George Town SC	George Town	T.E. McField Sports Centre
Roma United	George Town	T.E. McField Sports Centre
Scholars International	West Bay	Ed Bush Sports Complex
Sunset FC	George Town	T.E. McField Sports Centre

== Standings ==
Pos	Team	Pld	W	D	L	GF	GA	GD	Pts	Qualification or relegation
1	Elite	12	7	2	3	28	17	+11	23	Qualification for 2016 CFU Club Championship
2	Cayman Athletic	12	6	4	2	32	22	+10	22	
3	Scholars International	12	4	6	2	17	13	+4	18	
4	Bodden Town	12	4	5	3	18	18	0	17	
5	George Town	12	4	3	5	14	18	−4	15	
6	Roma United	12	3	5	4	14	14	0	14	
7	Sunset	12	4	1	7	16	18	−2	13	Relegation playoffs
8	Cayman Brac	12	1	4	7	16	35	−19	7	Relegation to Cayman Islands First Division

Updated to match(es) played on 18 December 2014. Source: Soccerway
Rules for classification: 1) points; 2) goal difference; 3) number of goals scored.

=== Promotion/relegation playoff ===
The 7th place team in this competition will face the runners-up of the First Division for a place in next season's competition.

TBD	v	TBD

== Results ==
=== Regular home games ===
Home \ Away	BOD	CAT	CBR	ELI	GEO	ROM	SCH	SUN	BOD	CAT	CBR	ELI	GEO	ROM	SCH	SUN
Bodden Town		1–1	2–2	1–2	2–0	1–0	1–4	1–1								
Cayman Athletic			3–2		2–0	3–3	1–1	1–3								
Cayman Brac	1–1	2–7		1–3	0–4	1–1		1–3								
Elite	3–2	3–3	5–1		5–0		2–3	1–4								
George Town		1–4	2–2	1–0		0–2	0–0	2–0								
Roma United	0–1	2–4	2–0	0–2	1–1		1–1									
Scholars International	2–2	1–2	2–3	1–1		0–0		1–0								
Sunset	2–3	3–1		0–1	0–3	0–2	0–1									

Updated to match(es) played on 18 December 2014. Source: Soccerway
Legend: Blue = home team win; Yellow = draw; Red = away team win.
