= 2019–20 Cayman Islands Premier League =

Cayman Islands Premier League
- Season: 2019–20
- Champions: Bodden Town FC
- Relegated: Alliance FC; North Side SC
- Caribbean Club Shield: Bodden Town FC
- Matches: 66
- Goals: 230 (3.48 per match)
- Top goalscorer: Kimani Finn (Scholars International); Chris Reeves (Elite)
- Biggest home win: Scholars 8–0 North Side (9 February 2020)
- Biggest away win: Alliance 0–7 Elite (7 December 2019)
- Highest scoring: Scholars 7–1 Alliance (2 November 2019); Scholars 8–0 North Side (9 February 2020)
- Longest winning run: 8 matches (Bodden Town)
- Longest unbeaten run: 8 matches (Bodden Town)
- Longest winless run: 11 matches (North Side)
- Longest losing run: 11 matches (North Side)

The 2019–20 Cayman Islands Premier League was the 41st edition of top tier Cayman Islands Premier League football competition in the Cayman Islands. The season began on 19 October 2019. The season was indefinitely postponed on 12 March 2020, due to the COVID-19 pandemic. The season was resumed on 15 August.

Scholars International unsuccessfully defended its 2018 title. Bodden Town successfully pursued its 4th title in the 2020 final.

== League table ==
Pos	Team	Pld	W	D	L	GF	GA	GD	Pts	Qualification or relegation
1	Bodden Town (C)	11	10	0	1	32	5	+27	30	Caribbean Club Shield
2	Scholars International	11	9	0	2	39	10	+29	27	
3	Elite	11	6	2	3	25	13	+12	20	
4	Academy	11	6	2	3	16	14	+2	20	
5	Latinos	11	5	4	2	26	13	+13	19	
6	Sunset	11	5	3	3	17	13	+4	18	
7	Future	11	4	3	4	14	17	−3	15	
8	Roma United	11	4	1	6	15	17	−2	13	
9	George Town	11	4	1	6	11	14	−3	13	
10	East End United	11	3	1	7	17	28	−11	10	
11	Alliance (R)	11	1	1	9	12	40	−28	4	Relegated
12	North Side (R)	11	0	0	11	6	46	−40	0	Relegated

Source: Soccerway
(C) Champions; (R) Relegated
