= List of football clubs in the Cayman Islands =

Association football clubs in the Cayman Islands are listed below.

== List ==
- Academy SC
- Bodden Town FC
- Cayman Athletic SC
- Cayman FC
- East End United
- Elite SC
- FC International
- Future SC
- George Town SC
- Roma United SC
- Scholars International FC
- Tigers FC
- Western Union FC
- 345 FC
