= Barry-Dre Tibbetts =

Cayman Islands footballer (born 2002)

Personal information
- Date of birth: 15 June 2002 (age 24)
- Place of birth: West Bay, Cayman Islands
- Height: 1.73 m (5 ft 8 in)
- Position: Midfielder

Team information
- Current team: Dakota Wesleyan Tigers
- Number: 5

College career
Years	Team	Apps	(Gls)
2021–	Dakota Wesleyan Tigers	9	(1)

Senior career*
Years	Team	Apps	(Gls)
2018–2020	Future SC		
2020–2021	East End United		

International career^{‡}
2021–	Cayman Islands	5	(0)
- * Club domestic league appearances and goals as of 19:44, 26 January 2022 (UTC) ‡ National team caps and goals as of 19:44, 26 January 2022 (UTC)

Barry-Dre Tibbetts (born 15 June 2002) is a Cayman Islands association footballer who currently plays for the Dakota Wesleyan Tigers and the Cayman Islands national team.

== Club career ==
As a youth, Tibbetts played for Elite SC. For the 2014–2015 season, he was named MVP of the U13 Gold League. In 2014 Tibbetts was part of the Sunset FC squad that competed in the Cayman Airways Invitational U14 tournament. Other notable teams competing in the tournament were the academies of Gillingham FC and Tottenham Hotspur from the UK, and Cavalier F.C. and Harbour View FC from Jamaica.

In 2015 Tibbetts impressed at a two-week trial with English club Swindon Town after being spotted by the club in training matches held in the Caymans. In 2018 he was chosen to participate in a week-long training in Spain with Atlético Madrid after catching the eye of a visiting coach at his local club.

In 2017 he was part of the Cayman Athletic SC team that advanced to the final of the U15 FA Cup. In the semi-final he scored two goals against Sunset FC to help secure the victory. Also in 2017 Tibbetts scored the game-winner for Future FC against Bodden Town FC in the final of the President's Cup. He then started the 2018–19 season with two goals in his first two matches. From 2018 to 2020 Tibbetts played for Future SC of the Cayman Islands Premier League. He had served as club captain. In 2020 he transferred to East End United of the same league.

In 2021 Tibbetts began playing college soccer in the United States for the Tigers of Dakota Wesleyan University. He made nine appearances for the team, scoring one goal, during his first season after debuting against Briar Cliff University in September. Following the season, he was named an All-Great Plains Athletic Conference Honorable Mention.

== International career ==
Tibbetts represented the Cayman Islands at the 2017 CONCACAF Boys' Under-15 Championship in Bradenton, Florida. The team won its first two matches, against Aruba and Bonaire. Following a 4–0 victory over Saint Martin, the Cayman Islands finished first in Group G and advanced to the knockout rounds.

In 2019 Tibbetts was named to the Cayman squad that competed in 2019 CONCACAF U-17 Championship qualifying. The team opened its campaign with a 2–0 victory over Grenada with Tibbetts starting the match. He started again in the second match as the Cayman Islands defeated the United States Virgin Islands 3–0 for a second consecutive victory.

Tibbetts made his senior international debut on 29 May 2019 in a friendly against Cuba. He went on to appear in the 2019–20 CONCACAF Nations League C and 2022 FIFA World Cup qualification.

=== International career statistics ===
As of match played 8 June 2021.

National team	Year	Apps	Goals
Cayman Islands	2019	3	0
Cayman Islands	2020	0	0
Cayman Islands	2021	2	0
Total		5	0
