= 2014–15 Cayman Islands FA Cup =

Results from the 2014–15 Cayman Islands FA Cup

== Schedule ==
=== First round ===
- Sunset 0-2 Cayman Brac
- Future 0-1 Academy

[Mar 8]

- George Town 3-1 East End

[Mar 10]

- Scholars 1-2 Bodden Town

[Mar 11]

- Elite 11-2 Savannah Tigers
- Latinos 4-6 Cayman Athletic
- Roma United bye North Side

=== Quarter-finals ===
11 April 2015	Cayman Athletic	4–0	Cayman Brac	George Town
		Report		Stadium: Truman Bodden Sports Complex

12 April 2015	North Side	1–3	Elite SC	North Side
		Report		Stadium: North Side Town Field

12 April 2015	Future	0–5	Bodden Town	West Bay
		Report		Stadium: West Bay Town Field

12 April 2015	Roma United	1–3	George Town	George Town
		Report		Stadium: Truman Bodden Sports Complex

=== Semi-finals ===
26 April 2015	Bodden Town	0–2	Cayman Athletic	Bodden Town
		Report		Stadium: Bodden Town Stadium

26 April 2015	George Town	2–3	Elite	George Town
		Report		Stadium: Truman Bodden Sports Complex

=== Final ===
31 May 2015	Cayman Athletic	3–2	Elite	George Town
		Report		Stadium: Truman Bodden Sports Complex
