= Shakur Welcome =

Caymanian footballer (born 1997)

Personal information
- Date of birth: 29 January 1997 (age 29)
- Position: Goalkeeper

Youth career
- 2011–2014: Cayman Athletic

Senior career*
Years	Team	Apps	(Gls)
2014–2017	Cayman Athletic		
2017–2019	Roma United		
2019–2020	Bodden Town		

International career^{‡}
- Cayman Islands U20
2015–2019	Cayman Islands	4	(0)
- * Club domestic league appearances and goals as of 2 March 2021 ‡ National team caps and goals as of 2 March 2021

Shakur Welcome
- Born: 29 January 1997 (age 29)

Rugby union career
- Current team: Buccaneers RFC
Senior career
Years	Team	Apps	(Points)
2016–	Buccaneers RFC		
International career
Years	Team	Apps	(Points)
2015–2016	Cayman Islands U19s		
- Correct as of 2 March 2021

Shakur Welcome (born 29 January 1997) is a Caymanian footballer. On 23 March 2020, Welcome received a 3-year ban from the Cayman Islands Football Association for throwing a ball at an assistant referee during a 23 January match of the 2019–20 Premier League against Academy SC.

As well as playing football, Welcome has also represented the Cayman Islands under-19 rugby team.

== Career statistics ==
=== International ===
As of 2 March 2021.

National team	Year	Apps	Goals
Cayman Islands	2015	1	0
Cayman Islands	2018	1	0
Cayman Islands	2019	2	0
Total		4	0
