= Caymanian football clubs in North American competitions =

This is a list of participation by football clubs in the Cayman Islands in North American competitions.

In 1981, Yama Sun Oil became the first Caymanian football club to participate in a CONCACAF competition, entering in the Caribbean zone of the 1981 CONCACAF Champions' Cup. They advanced to the second qualifying round before losing to SUBT of present-day Curaçao.

== CONCACAF Champions Cup/Champions League ==
Season	Team	Round	Opponent	Home	Away	Aggregate
1981	Yama Sun Oil	First round	(Jamaica) St. Thomas	1–0	1–0	2–0
1981	Yama Sun Oil	Second round	(Netherlands Antilles) SUBT	1–2	0–5	1–7
1984	Saint George's	Results unknown				
1991	Strikers	First round	(Haiti) Racing Gonaïves	0–0	1–2	1–2
1992	Strikers	First round	(Martinique) Aiglon	0–0	0–7	0–7

== CONCACAF Caribbean Cup/CFU Club Championship ==
Season	Team	Round	Opponent	Home	Away	Aggregate
2002	George Town	Preliminary round	(Jamaica) Harbour View	0–3	1–7	1–10
2010	Elite	Withdrew				
2011	Bodden Town	Preliminary round	(Puerto Rico) River Plate	1–0	0–2	1–2
2012	Elite SC	Group 1	(Cayman Islands) George Town	1–2	—	2nd
2012	Elite SC	Group 1	(Bermuda) North Village Rams	2–1	—	2nd
2012	George Town	Group 1	(Cayman Islands) Elite	2–1	—	1st
2012	George Town	Group 1	(Bermuda) North Village Rams	0–0	—	1st
2012	George Town	Group 4	(Trinidad and Tobago) Caledonia AIA	0–5	—	3rd
2012	George Town	Group 4	Puerto Rico Islanders	0–8	—	3rd
2014	Bodden Town	Group 1	(Puerto Rico) Bayamón	0–5	—	4th
2014	Bodden Town	Group 1	(Curaçao) Centro Dominguito	2–4	—	4th
2014	Bodden Town	Group 1	(Guadeloupe) USR	0–1	—	4th
2016	Scholars International	Group 1	(Trinidad and Tobago) Central	0–6	—	3rd
2016	Scholars International	Group 1	(Jamaica) Montego Bay United	0–4	—	3rd
2017	Elite	Group A	(Dominican Republic) Barcelona Atlético	0–4	—	4th
2017	Elite	Group A	(Antigua and Barbuda) Grenades	0–2	—	4th
2017	Elite	Group A	(Jamaica) Montego Bay United	0–5	—	4th
2017	Scholars International	Group D	(Jamaica) Portmore United	0–2	—	4th
2017	Scholars International	Group D	Puerto Rico FC	0–4	—	4th
2017	Scholars International	Group D	(Suriname) Transvaal	0–4	—	4th

=== CONCACAF Caribbean Shield/CFU Club Shield ===
Season	Team	Round	Opponent	Home	Away	Aggregate
2018	Bodden Town	Group C	(Saint Kitts and Nevis) Cayon Rockets	2–1	—	3rd
2018	Bodden Town	Group C	(Curaçao) Centro Dominguito	0–0	—	3rd
2018	Bodden Town	Group C	(Martinique) Franciscain	2–5	—	3rd
2019	Scholars International	Group A	(Guyana) Fruta Conquerors	2–0	—	3rd
2019	Scholars International	Group A	(Curaçao) Jong Holland	0–1	—	3rd
2019	Scholars International	Group A	Santiago de Cuba	0–0	—	3rd
2019	Scholars International	Consolation round	(Aruba) Dakota	—	1–2	1–2
2020	Scholars International	Group B	(Suriname) Inter Moengotapoe	— (Note: The 2020 Caribbean Club Shield was canceled due to the COVID-19 pandemic.)		
2020	Scholars International	Group B	(Puerto Rico) Metropolitan	—		
2020	Scholars International	Group B	Santiago de Cuba	—		
2022	Scholars International	Group A	(Puerto Rico) Bayamón	Withdrew		
2022	Scholars International	Group A	Junior Stars	Withdrew		
2022	Scholars International	Group A	(Dominica) South East	Withdrew		
2023	Scholars International	Group B	(Martinique) Golden Lion	—	0–4	2nd
2023	Scholars International	Group B	(Dominica) South East	2–0	—	2nd
2024	Scholars International	Round of 16	(Dominica) Dublanc	0–3		
2025	Scholars International	Group D	(Trinidad and Tobago) Port of Spain	—	1–2	5th
2025	Scholars International	Group D	(Martinique) Club Franciscain	—	0–1	5th
2026	Elite	First round	(British Virgin Islands) Virgin Gorda United	2–0		
2026	Elite	Round of 16	(Dominican Republic) Delfines del Este	0–2		

== Records and statistics ==
=== CONCACAF Champions Cup ===
Team	Pld.	W	D	L	GF	GA	GD
Strikers	4	0	2	2	1	9	−8
Yama Sun Oil	4	2	0	2	3	7	−4
Total	8	2	2	4	4	16	−12

=== CONCACAF Caribbean Cup ===
Team	Pld.	W	D	L	GF	GA	GD
Bodden Town	Pld	W	D	L	GF	GA	GD
George Town	Pld	W	D	L	GF	GA	GD

=== CONCACAF Caribbean Shield ===
Team	Pld.	W	D	L	GF	GA	GD
Bodden Town	3	1	1	1	4	6	−2
Scholars International	9	2	1	6	6	13	–7
Elite	2	1	0	1	2	2	0
Total	14	4	2	8	12	21	–9
