= Mark Ebanks =

Caymanian association footballer

Personal information
- Full name: Mark Samuel Ebanks
- Date of birth: 26 December 1990 (age 35)
- Place of birth: West Bay, Cayman Islands
- Height: 1.70 m (5 ft 7 in)
- Position: Forward

Team information
- Current team: Future

Senior career*
Years	Team	Apps	(Gls)
2009–2010	Future		
2010–2011	Ashford Town	1	(0)
2011–2013	Scholars International		
2013–2014	Fort Lauderdale Strikers	0	(0)
2014	Temecula FC		
2016–2017	Future		
2017–2019	Academy		
2019–	Future		

International career^{‡}
- Cayman Islands U17
- Cayman Islands U20
2011	Cayman Islands U23	3	(0)
2010–	Cayman Islands	23	(7)
- * Club domestic league appearances and goals as of 20 November 2025 ‡ National team caps and goals as of 26 March 2023

Mark Samuel Ebanks (born 26 December 1990) is a Caymanian footballer who plays as a forward for Future SC and the Cayman Islands national team.

== Club career ==
Ebanks was one of a group of Caymanian players identified by the country's football federation who they believed would benefit from playing overseas. He joined Ashford Town (Middlesex) in England after being invited over in late 2010 on an initial short term basis, although the move was extended then until the end of the season. He made one first-team appearance for the club, with his spell at the team affected by injuries.

== International career ==
Ebanks represented the Cayman Islands during World Cup qualifying matches in 2011.

== Career statistics ==
=== International ===
As of match played 26 March 2023

National team	Year	Apps	Goals
Cayman Islands	2010	3	2
Cayman Islands	2011	5	2
Cayman Islands	2012	0	0
Cayman Islands	2013	0	0
Cayman Islands	2014	0	0
Cayman Islands	2015	3	1
Cayman Islands	2016	0	0
Cayman Islands	2017	0	0
Cayman Islands	2018	3	0
Cayman Islands	2019	3	1
Cayman Islands	2020	0	0
Cayman Islands	2021	3	1
Cayman Islands	2022	2	0
Cayman Islands	2023	1	0
Total		23	7

==== International goals ====
Scores and results list the Cayman Islands' goal tally first.

No.	Date	Venue	Opponent	Score	Result	Competition
1.	4 October 2010	Juan Ramón Loubriel Stadium, Bayamón, Puerto Rico	Anguilla	1–1	4–1	2010 Caribbean Cup qualification
2.	4 October 2010	Juan Ramón Loubriel Stadium, Bayamón, Puerto Rico	Anguilla	2–1	4–1	2010 Caribbean Cup qualification
3.	7 September 2011	Truman Bodden Sports Complex, George Town, Cayman Islands	El Salvador	1–2	1–4	2014 FIFA World Cup qualification
4.	15 November 2011	Truman Bodden Sports Complex, George Town, Cayman Islands	Dominican Republic	1–1	1–1	2014 FIFA World Cup qualification
5.	30 March 2015	Truman Bodden Sports Complex, George Town, Cayman Islands	Belize	1–0	1–1	2018 FIFA World Cup qualification
6.	21 March 2019	Ed Bush Stadium, West Bay, Cayman Islands	Montserrat	1–1	1–2	2019–20 CONCACAF Nations League qualification
7.	8 June 2021	IMG Academy, Bradenton, United States	Bermuda	1–0	1–1	2022 FIFA World Cup qualification
