= Ramon Sealy =

Caymanian footballer and cricketer (born 1991)

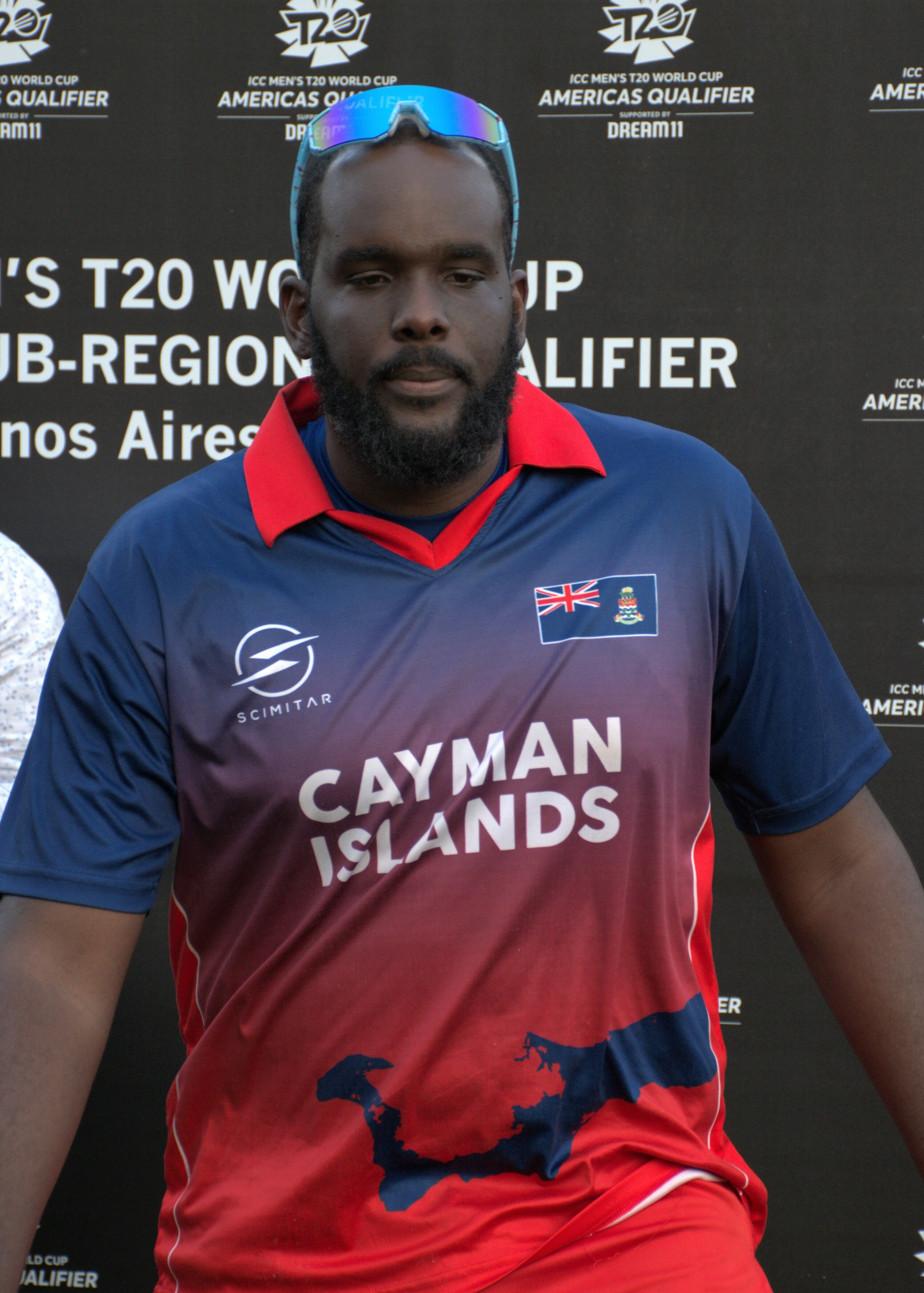
- Sealy at 2023 Americas T20 Qualifier

Personal information
- Full name: Ramon Anthony Sealy
- Date of birth: 22 April 1991 (age 35)
- Place of birth: Christ Church, Barbados
- Height: 1.88 m (6 ft 2 in)
- Position: Goalkeeper

Team information
- Current team: Bodden Town

Senior career*
Years	Team	Apps	(Gls)
2010–	Bodden Town		

International career^{‡}
- Cayman Islands U23
2009–	Cayman Islands	15	(0)
Cricket career
Cricket information
Batting	Right-handed
Bowling	Legbreak
International information
National side	Cayman Islands
T20I debut (cap 19)	13 April 2022 v Bahamas
Last T20I	4 March 2026 v Suriname
Source: Cricinfo, 11 March 2026
- * Club domestic league appearances and goals as of 11 July 2020 ‡ National team caps and goals as of 11 July 2020

Anthony Ramon Sealy (born 22 April 1991) is a Caymanian sportsman who plays both football and cricket. He plays as a goalkeeper for Bodden Town and the Cayman Islands national football team, and as a right-handed batsman for the Cayman Islands national cricket team.

== International career ==
Sealy made his debut for the Cayman Islands on 28 June 2009 in a friendly against Jamaica. His first competitive appearances came the following year in 2010 Caribbean Cup qualifying, making starts against Saint Martin and Anguilla.

== Cricket career ==
Sealy is also a cricketer, representing the Cayman Islands in the 2014 ICC World Cricket League Division Five tournament. In August 2017, he was named captain of the Cayman Islands for the 2017 ICC World Cricket League Division Five tournament.

In April 2022, he was named in the Cayman Islands' Twenty20 International (T20I) squad for their series against the Bahamas. He made his T20I debut on 13 April 2022, for the Cayman Islands against the Bahamas.

== Honours ==
Bodden Town

- Cayman Islands Premier League: 2012–13, 2013–14, 2016–17
- Cayman Islands FA Cup: 2012–13, 2016–17
