= Cayman Brac FC =

Association football club in the Cayman Islands

- Founded: 2006; 20 years ago
- Ground: Cayman Brac Stadium
- Capacity: 1,000
- League: Cayman Islands Premier League
- 2025–26: 11th

Cayman Brac FC is a football club from Cayman Brac, Cayman Islands that currently competes in the Cayman Islands Premier League.

== History ==
Cayman Brac FC began competing in CIFA competitions in 2006. In 2011, local media outlet The Cayman Compass noted that the Cayman Brac's competitiveness had recently increased significantly under long-time manager Mitchum Sanford as the club prepared for a Cayman Islands FA Cup match against Bodden Town. The match would mark the first time the two clubs had ever met.

Cayman Brac FC was promoted to the Cayman Islands Premier League for the 2014/2015 season. The prior season, the club finished runner-up to Roma United in the Cayman Islands First Division. The club opened its top-flight season away at Bodden Town in September 2014.

In 2016, the club revived the Brac Cup, an invitational knock-out tournament, following a twelve-year hiatus. For that edition, the club invited the General Manager of Harbour View from the neighboring Jamaica Premier League. The club hoped to create a partnership which would see CBFC players attending annual trials and provide training opportunities for players and staff. The club also regularly invited university teams from the United States to compete in the competition in hopes of providing opportunities for players from Cayman Brac to play college soccer abroad.

By the 2022/23 season, the club was back in the First Division. At that point, the club had never won a league championship at any level. In January 2025, the club was automatically promoted back to the Premier League as the First Division and Second Division were merged to meet FIFA requirements regarding the number of teams in a league.

== Domestic history ==
Key

Champion Runners-up 3rd Place

| Season | League | | | | | | | Notes |
| Season | Div. | Pos. | Pl. | W | D | L | P | Notes |
|---|---|---|---|---|---|---|---|---|
| 2020/21 | II | 8th | 20 | 6 | 5 | 9 | 23 | |
| 2022 | II | 4th | 7 | 1 | 1 | 5 | 4 | |
| 2022/23 | II | | | | | | | |
| 2023/24 | II | 4th | 14 | 3 | 4 | 7 | 13 | |
| 2024/25 | I | 9th | 20 | 4 | 1 | 15 | 13 | |

== Stadium ==
The club plays its home matches at the Cayman Brac Stadium at the Cayman Brac Sports Complex on Cayman Brac. The synthetic turf pitch was first laid on The Bluff in May 2008. The FIFA-standard facility's opening ceremony included a celebrity match and was attended by Jeffrey Webb, president of the Cayman Islands Football Association.

== Youth ==
The club organizes teams for various age groups for the island's youth. The teams compete in the Cayman Islands Football Association youth leagues.
