= Carson Fagan =

Caymanian football player

Personal information
- Full name: Carson Fagan
- Date of birth: 1 May 1982 (age 44)
- Place of birth: Cayman Islands
- Position: Midfielder

Team information
- Current team: East End United

Senior career*
Years	Team	Apps	(Gls)
2001–2004	George Town SC		
2004–2007	FC International		
2007–2009	George Town SC		
2009–	East End United		

International career^{‡}
2000–	Cayman Islands	13	(1)
- * Club domestic league appearances and goals ‡ National team caps and goals as of 21:28, 8 February 2011 (UTC)

Carson Fagan (born 1 May 1982) is a Caymanian international football player who plays as a midfielder for East End United in the Cayman Islands League.

Fagan made his international debut for the Cayman Islands against Cuba in the 4–0 World Cup 2002 qualifier on 5 March 2000.

He had a trial with English club Bolton Wanderers in March 2000 along with fellow Cayman Island players Frederick Wilks and Kevin James but after a reserve team appearance against Everton was not given a contract.

== International career ==
#	Date	Venue	Opponent	Result	Competition
1.	5 March 2000	Pedro Marrero, Havana, Cuba	Cuba	4–0	World Cup Qualifiers
2.	19 March 2000	Truman Bodden, George Town, Cayman Islands	Cuba	0–0	World Cup Qualifiers
3.	27 November 2002	Truman Bodden, George Town, Cayman Islands	Cuba	0–5	Gold Cup Qualifying
4.	29 November 2002	Truman Bodden, George Town, Cayman Islands	Dominican Republic	0–1	Gold Cup Qualifying
5.	24 November 2004	Arnos Vale Playing Ground, Kingstown, Saint Vincent and the Grenadines	Bermuda	2–1	Digicel Caribbean Cup Qualifying
6.	28 November 2004	Arnos Vale Playing Ground, Kingstown, Saint Vincent and the Grenadines	Saint Vincent and the Grenadines	4–0	Digicel Caribbean Cup Qualifying
7.	3 February 2008	National Stadium, Hamilton, Bermuda	Bermuda	1–1	World Cup Qualifiers
8.	30 March 2008	Truman Bodden, George Town, Cayman Islands	Bermuda	1–3	World Cup Qualifiers
9.	30 August 2008	Truman Bodden, George Town, Cayman Islands	Antigua and Barbuda	1–1	Caribbean Championship
10.	31 August 2008	Truman Bodden, George Town, Cayman Islands	Bermuda	0–0	Caribbean Championship
11.	11 October 2008	Stade René Serge Nabajoth, Les Abymes, Guadeloupe	Guadeloupe	7–1	Caribbean Championship
12.	13 October 2008	Stade René Serge Nabajoth, Les Abymes, Guadeloupe	Martinique	0–1	Caribbean Championship
13.	9 November 2008	Truman Bodden, George Town, Cayman Islands	Jamaica	0–2	Friendly
