= Cayman Islands Digicel Cup =

The Cayman Islands Digicel Cup is a cup of the Cayman Islands football, first held in 2006. It is sponsored by Digicel.

== Winners ==
- 2005/06 : Money Express 2-0 George Town SC
- 2006/07 : Scholars International bt Tigers FC
- 2007/08 : Roma United 1-0 George Town SC
- 2008/09 : Elite SC 4-1 Scholars International
- 2009/10 : George Town SC 2-1 Bodden Town
- 2010/11 : George Town SC 3-1 Roma United
- 2011/12 : Elite SC 2-0 Bodden Town
- 2012/13 : Scholars International 0-0 (aet, 7-6 pen) Elite SC

President's Cup

- 2013/14 : Bodden Town FC 2-1 George Town SC
- 2014/15 : Bodden Town FC 1-1 Roma United SC [aet, 3-1 pen]
- 2015/16 : Roma United SC 2-1 Bodden Town FC [aet]
- 2016/17 : Scholars International 4-1 Bodden Town FC

== Performance By Club ==
Club	Winners	Runners-up	Winning Years and Runner-Up Years
George Town SC	2	2	2006, 2008, 2010, 2011
Elite SC	2	1	2009, 2012, 2013
Scholars International	2	1	2007, 2009, 2013
Roma United	1	1	2008, 2011
Western Union FC	1	-	2006
Bodden Town	-	2	2010, 2012
Tigers FC	-	1	2007
