= Cayman Islands Second Division =

- Folded: 2025
- Country: (Cayman Islands) CIFA
- Confederation: CONCACAF
- Number of clubs: 10
- Level on pyramid: 3
- Promotion to: First Division (formerly)
- Domestic cup(s): Cayman Islands FA Cup
- Last champions: Scholars International B (2023/24)
- Website: Website

The Cayman Islands Second Division was the third and lowest tier league of football in the Cayman Islands. It was organized by the Cayman Islands Football Association.

== History ==
Formerly, there was promotion/relegation between the Second Division and First Division. In January 2025, it was announced that the two leagues were merged mid-season to meet FIFA's requirement of at least ten teams in a professional league. The league's final champion was the reserve side of Scholars International SC for the 2023/24 season.
