= Gabriele Dell′Oglio =

Cayman Islands footballer

Personal information
- Date of birth: 9 March 2004 (age 22)
- Position: Midfielder

Team information
- Current team: Málaga City

Youth career
- –2020: Academy SC

Senior career*
Years	Team	Apps	(Gls)
2020–2022	Academy SC		
2022–	Málaga City		

International career^{‡}
2024–	Cayman Islands	2	(0)
- * Club domestic league appearances and goals as of 17:53, 10 June 2024 (UTC) ‡ National team caps and goals as of 17:53, 10 June 2024 (UTC)

Gabriele Dell′Oglio (born 9 March 2004) is a Cayman Islands association footballer who plays for Spanish Tercera Federación club FC Málaga City and the Cayman Islands national team.

== Club career ==
Dell′Oglio came up through the ranks of Academy SC of the Cayman Islands Premier League.

== International career ==
Dell′Oglio represented the Cayman Islands at the youth level in the 2019 CONCACAF Under-15 Championship and 2022 CONCACAF U-20 Championship qualifying. In the former competition, the team had an impressive string of results including a 0–0 draw with Nicaragua in which Dell′Oglio put a dangerous shot on goal that forced the keeper to punch the ball over the crossbar for the save.

Dell′Oglio made his senior international debut on 26 March 2024 in a friendly away to Moldova. The following June, he made his second appearance for the team in a 1–0 victory over Antigua and Barbuda in 2026 FIFA World Cup qualification. The victory was the Cayman team's first-ever win in World Cup qualification.

=== International career statistics ===
As of match played 8 June 2024.

Cayman Islands national team
2024	2	0
Total	2	0
