= Anton Nelson =

Caymanian footballer (born 1997)

Personal information
- Full name: Anthony Piers Nelson
- Date of birth: 31 July 1997 (age 29)
- Place of birth: George Town, Cayman Islands
- Height: 1.80 m (5 ft 11 in)
- Position: Striker

College career
Years	Team	Apps	(Gls)
2016	Valparaiso Crusaders		

Senior career*
Years	Team	Apps	(Gls)
2015–2017	Tigers		
2018	Bognor Regis Town	7	(0)
2018–2019	Llanelli Town	16	(0)
2019-2024	Sunset	46	(37)
2025	Masters FA B	13	(8)
2025	Masters FA	2	(1)

International career^{‡}
2012	Cayman Islands U15	5	(3)
2017	Cayman Islands U20	5	(3)
2019–	Cayman Islands	8	(0)
- * Club domestic league appearances and goals as of 24 August 2025 ‡ National team caps and goals as of 20 November 2023

Anthony Piers Nelson (born 31 July 1997) is a Caymanian football player who plays as a striker for the Cayman Islands national team.

== Early life ==
Nelson played youth football with Tigers. In January 2009, he won the Kick-It 3v3 Soccer World Championship with the Cayman Stingrays U11. At age 13, he moved to England and attended the Shrewsbury School.

In 2016, he began attending Valparaiso University in the United States, where he played for the men's soccer team.

== Club career ==
In 2017, he played with Bognor Regis Town in the National League South.

In 2018, he has a trial with Welsh club Flint Town United, before signing with Llanelli Town in the Welsh Premier League. Afterwards, he had trials with Northern Irish Premier League clubs, before returning to the Cayman Islands.

In 2025, he played with Canadian club Master's FA, featuring mostly with the second team.

== International career ==
He made his debut for the Cayman Islands national football team on 22 March 2019 in a CONCACAF Nations League qualifier against Montserrat.

== Career statistics ==
As of match played 31 May 2019.

National team	Year	Apps	Goals
Cayman Islands	2019	3	0
Total		3	0
