= Tyler Beckford =

Cayman Islands footballer

Personal information
- Date of birth: 10 August 2006 (age 20)
- Place of birth: Grand Cayman, Cayman Islands
- Height: 1.80 m (5 ft 11 in)
- Position: Forward

Team information
- Current team: Hesston Larks
- Number: 9

College career
Years	Team	Apps	(Gls)
2024–	Hesston Larks	17	(10)

Senior career*
Years	Team	Apps	(Gls)
2022–2024	Future		
2024–	Inter Wichita		

International career^{‡}
2024–	Cayman Islands	2	(0)
- * Club domestic league appearances and goals as of 13:44, 29 July 2025 (UTC) ‡ National team caps and goals as of 13:44, 29 July 2025 (UTC)

Tyler Beckford (born 10 August 2006) is a Cayman Islands association footballer who plays college soccer for the Hesston Larks, and the Cayman Islands national team.

== Club career ==
Beckford began playing football at age five and eventually joined his school team at Sir John A Cumber Primary School. At the youth level, he played in the Cayman's Primary Football League for Future SC. He began playing in the Cayman Islands Premier League with Future SC's senior team at just age 16.

In 2024, Beckford committed to play college soccer in the United States for the Larks of Hesston College. During his first season with the team, he scored ten goals in seventeen matches to become its top scorer. He was then named to the All-Kansas Jayhawk Community College Conference First Team, a KJCCC Player of the Week, and the team's Offensive Player of the Year. While playing for the Larks, Beckford also signed for Inter Wichita FC of the United Premier Soccer League.

== International career ==
Beckford made his senior international debut on 26 March 2024 in a friendly against Moldova. He made his competitive debut on 4 June 2025 in a 2026 FIFA World Cup qualification match against Bermuda.

=== International career statistics ===
As of match played 4 June 2025.

Cayman Islands national team
2024	1	0
2025	1	0
Total	2	0
