= Jonah Ebanks =

Caymanian footballer (born 1996)

Personal information
- Full name: Jonah Ebanks
- Date of birth: 7 May 1996 (age 30)
- Place of birth: Cayman Islands
- Position: Midfielder

Team information
- Current team: 345

Senior career*
Years	Team	Apps	(Gls)
2016–2019	Academy	34	(27)
2019-2023	Scholars International	17	(21)
2023	345	33	(36)

International career^{‡}
- Cayman Islands U20
2018–	Cayman Islands	18	(5)
- * Club domestic league appearances and goals as of 15 August 2025 ‡ National team caps and goals as of 15 August 2025

Jonah Ebanks (born 7 May 1996) is a Caymanian footballer who plays as a midfielder for 345 and the Cayman Islands national team.

== International career ==
Ebanks debuted for the Cayman Islands on 12 October 2018, in the CONCACAF Nations League qualifying rounds against the Dominican Republic in a 3–0 defeat.

On 8 September 2019, Ebanks scored his first goal for Cayman Islands against Barbados, resulting a 3–2 victory.

== Career statistics ==
As of match played 6 June 2022

Appearances and goals by national team and year
National team	Year	Apps	Goals
Cayman Islands	2018	3	0
Cayman Islands	2019	7	2
Cayman Islands	2021	4	1
Cayman Islands	2022	2	1
Total		16	4

Scores and results list Cayman Islands' goal tally first, score column indicates score after each Ebanks goal.

List of international goals scored by Jonah Ebanks
No.	Date	Venue	Opponent	Score	Result	Competition
1	8 September 2019	Truman Bodden Sports Complex, George Town, Cayman Islands	Barbados	2–1	3–2	2019–20 CONCACAF Nations League C
2	15 October 2019	Truman Bodden Sports Complex, George Town, Cayman Islands	Saint Martin	1–0	1–0	2019–20 CONCACAF Nations League C
3	2 June 2021	IMG Academy, Bradenton, United States	Aruba	1–0	1–3	2022 FIFA World Cup qualification
4	6 June 2022	Truman Bodden Sports Complex, George Town, Cayman Islands	British Virgin Islands	1–0	1–1	2022–23 CONCACAF Nations League C
