= Jorel Bellafonte =

Caymanian footballer (born 1995)

Personal information
- Full name: Jorel Bellafonte
- Date of birth: 2 March 1995 (age 31)
- Place of birth: Cayman Islands
- Height: 1.83 m (6 ft 0 in)
- Position: Forward

Team information
- Current team: Academy SC

Senior career*
Years	Team	Apps	(Gls)
2018–2020	Roma United		
2020–	Academy SC	2	(1)

International career^{‡}
2019–	Cayman Islands	4	(1)
- * Club domestic league appearances and goals as of 12 July 2020 ‡ National team caps and goals as of 12 July 2020

Jorel Bellafonte (born 2 March 1995) is a Caymanian former track athlete, and current footballer who plays as a forward for Academy SC and the Cayman Islands national team.

== Athletic career ==
Belafonte was a formerly a 800m and 1500m athlete, while at high school in Jamaica. He attended Calabar High School, where he won individual medals at the Inter-Secondary Schools Boys and Girls Championships in Jamaica, as well as team medals with his high school at the Penn Relays, winning the 4 × 800 m relay in 2014. He then went on to become a Clemson Tiger at university, moving down to the 400mH. On the international stage, he represented the Cayman Islands at the CARIFTA Games on several occasions. He holds the national Caymanian indoor 800m record, with a time of 1:52.21 on a regular indoor track, and 1:51.82 on and oversized track (OT).

== International football career ==
On 5 September 2019, Bellafonte made his debut against the US Virgin Islands in a 0–2 victory in the CONCACAF Nations League. On 8 September 2019, he scored his first goal for Cayman Islands against Barbados in a 3–2 victory.

== Career statistics ==
As of match played 19 November 2019.

National team	Year	Apps	Goals
Cayman Islands	2019	4	1
Total		4	1

=== International goals ===
Scores and results list the Cayman Islands' goal tally first.

No.	Date	Venue	Opponent	Score	Result	Competition
1.	8 September 2019	Truman Bodden Sports Complex, George Town, Cayman Islands	Barbados	3–2	3–2	2019–20 CONCACAF Nations League C
