= Allean Grant =

Caymanian footballer

Personal information
- Full name: Allean Grant
- Date of birth: 10 February 1983 (age 43)
- Place of birth: Cayman Islands
- Position: Forward

Team information
- Current team: Tigers FC

Senior career*
Years	Team	Apps	(Gls)
- Latinos FC
- Tigers FC

International career^{‡}
2008–	Cayman Islands	3	(1)
- * Club domestic league appearances and goals ‡ National team caps and goals as of 18:55, 20 April 2012 (UTC)

Allean Grant (born 10 February 1983) is a Caymanian footballer who plays as a forward. He has represented the Cayman Islands at full international level.
