= Digicel Cup =

Digicel Cup may mean one of several sporting competitions sponsored by Digicel:

- Caribbean Cup (2004-2008), a national association football tournament
- Papua New Guinea National Rugby League competition (2011-present), a national club rugby league competition
- Cayman Islands Digicel Cup, a national club association football competition
- Digicel Cup (rugby), a national club rugby union competition
- Taça Digicel (Digicel Cup in English), an East Timorese football competition
