= 345 FC =

Football club in the Cayman Islands

- Founded: 2017; 9 years ago
- Ground: CIS Turf
- Manager: Peter Reijn
- League: Cayman Islands Premier League
- 2025–26: 5th
- Website: 345fc.co

345 FC is a football club from the Cayman Islands that currently competes in the Cayman Islands Premier League.

== History ==
345 FC was founded in 2017 as the local affiliate of Total Soccer. The club operates under the Dutch football philosophy.

== Youth ==
345 FC regularly enters sides into the Gothia Cup, the world's largest youth tournament. In 2023, the club finished in the final thirty-two teams with teams from over one hundred and forty countries participating. That year, the club also participated in the prestigious Rood-Wit International Tournament in the Netherlands. The club finished fifth out of twelve clubs which included youth selections from Ajax, AC Milan, Borussia Dortmund, and Lille. 345 FC entered the tournament again in 2024. In 2025, the club's U10 side toured the United Kingdom and played against some of its top sides. With a win over an academy team from Chelsea, 345 FC earned its first victory over a Class 1 academy team from one of England’s Big Six clubs. In addition to international tournaments, the club competes at all levels of the Cayman's domestic youth league system.

The club's has produced both male and female youth players that have gone on to join major clubs abroad, including Lawrence Maharaj who joined the Leicester City Academy in 2025 and Grace Moss who joined the academy of Derby County F.C. Women in 2024. Other youth players have joined Newcastle United, Fleetwood Town, and FC Zlin.

== Senior ==
The club fielded a senior team in the Cayman Islands league system for the first time for the 2022/2023 season. That year, 345 FC won the Cayman Islands First Division and earned promotion to the Cayman Islands Premier League the following season. The club entered the final matchday of its debut season in the top flight sitting at the top of the league table. However, a defeat to Scholars International SC in the match resulted in Scholars International tying the club with thirty points and winning the league on goal differential. That season, 345 FC was the league's highest-scoring team with forty-seven goals in fourteen matches. The league's top two scorers were part of the 345 FC squad with Jonah Ebanks and Matthias Mijnheer tallying eighteen and thirteen goals, respectively.

=== Domestic history ===
Key

Champion Runners-up 3rd Place

Season	League							Notes
Season	Div.	Pos.	Pl.	W	D	L	P	Notes
2022/23	II	1st						Promoted to Premier League
2023/24	I	2nd	14	10	0	4	30	
2024/25	I	2nd	20	13	4	3	43	
