= Leon Whittaker =

Caymanian football player (born 1985)

Personal information
- Full name: Leon Whittaker
- Date of birth: April 16, 1985 (age 41)
- Place of birth: Cayman Islands
- Height: 5 ft 7 in (1.70 m)
- Position: Midfielder

Team information
- Current team: George Town SC

Senior career*
Years	Team	Apps	(Gls)
2002 – 2008	George Town SC		
2008 – 2010	Scholars International		
2010–present	George Town SC		

International career
2001	Cayman Islands U-18		
2001–2006	Cayman Islands	7	(1)
- * Club domestic league appearances and goals

Leon Whittaker (born 16 April 1985)) is a Caymanian footballer currently playing for George Town SC.

== International career ==
=== Under-18 ===
#	Date	Venue	Opponent	Result	Competition
1.	21 September 2001	Thomas A. Robinson National Stadium, Nassau, Bahamas	Bahamas	2–0	Milo Cup 2001
2.	23 September 2001	Thomas A. Robinson National Stadium, Nassau, Bahamas	Bahamas	1–2	Milo Cup 2001

=== First Team ===
Whittaker made his debut for the Cayman Islands national football team in a February 2001 friendly match against Trinidad & Tobago and earned 7 caps in total. One of those was a FIFA World Cup qualification match against Cuba.

#	Date	Venue	Opponent	Result	Competition
1.	21 February 2001	Truman Bodden, George Town, Cayman Islands	Trinidad and Tobago	0–3	Friendly
2.	27 November 2002	Truman Bodden, George Town, Cayman Islands	Cuba	0–5	Gold Cup Qualifying
3.	1 December 2002	Truman Bodden, George Town, Cayman Islands	Martinique	3–0	Gold Cup Qualifying
4.	7 September 2003	National Stadium, St. George's, Grenada	Grenada	5–0	CONMEBOL Men Pre-Olympic Tournament 2004
5.	12 October 2003	Truman Bodden, George Town, Cayman Islands	Grenada	1–5	CONMEBOL Men Pre-Olympic Tournament 2004
6.	22 February 2004	Truman Bodden, George Town, Cayman Islands	Cuba	1–2	World Cup Qualifying
7.	2 August 2006	Estadio Pedro Marrero, Havana, Puerto Rico	Bahamas	3–1	Caribbean Cup
