= Ronald Douglas =

Ronald Douglas may refer to:

- Ronald G. Douglas (1938–2018), American mathematician
- Ronald MacDonald Douglas, the pseudonym of Ronald Edmonston (1896–1984), Scottish author, actor and political figure

== See also ==
- Ron Douglas (born 1980), Caymanian footballer
