= Carlos Escobar =

Carlos Escobar may refer to:

- Carlos Escobar (footballer, born 1990) (Carlos Escobar Casarin), Chilean footballer
- Carlos Escobar (footballer, born 1989) (Carlos Escobar Ortiz), Chilean footballer
- Carlos Escobar (footballer, born 1978), Honduran footballer
