= Dwayne Wright (footballer) =

Caymanian footballer

Personal information
- Full name: Dwayne Wright
- Date of birth: 25 January 1989 (age 37)
- Place of birth: Cayman Islands
- Position: Forward

Team information
- Current team: Elite SC

Senior career*
Years	Team	Apps	(Gls)
2009–2010	Roma United		(7)
2010–	Elite SC		(69)
2012-2013	Bodden Town FC		(21)

International career^{‡}
2011–	Cayman Islands	1	(0)
- * Club domestic league appearances and goals ‡ National team caps and goals as of 06:25, 20 April 2012 (UTC)

Dwayne Wright (born 25 January 1989) is a Caymanian footballer who plays as a forward. He has represented the Cayman Islands during a World Cup qualifying match in 2011.
