= Dion Brandon =

Caymanian footballer (born 1986)

Personal information
- Full name: Gary Dion Brandon
- Date of birth: 8 June 1986 (age 40)
- Place of birth: Cayman Islands
- Position: Midfielder

Team information
- Current team: East End United

Senior career*
Years	Team	Apps	(Gls)
2008–2010	Future SC		
2010-	East End United		

International career^{‡}
2008–2012	Cayman Islands	9	(0)
- * Club domestic league appearances and goals ‡ National team caps and goals as of 11:13, 20 April 2012 (UTC)

Gary Dion Brandon (born 8 June 1986) is a Caymanian footballer who is a player-manager for East End United. He plays as a midfielder and has represented the Cayman Islands during World Cup qualifying matches in 2008 and 2011. He is a technical director the Cayman Islands Football Association.
