= Tigers FC =

Tigers FC or Tiger FC is the name of several association football clubs:

- Tigers FC (Australia), the National Premier Leagues Capital Football team, previously linked to Cooma FC
- Tigers FC (Cayman Islands), a club playing in the Cayman Islands league
- Tigers FC (Malawi), a club playing in the Malawi Premier Division
- Tiger FC (South Sudan), a club playing in the South Sudan Football Championship
