= Andre McFarlane =

Caymanian footballer

Personal information
- Full name: Andre Jerome McFarlane
- Date of birth: 1 November 1989 (age 37)
- Place of birth: Cayman Islands
- Position: Defender

Team information
- Current team: Tivoli Gardens

Senior career*
Years	Team	Apps	(Gls)
2009–2013	Future SC		
2013–	Tivoli Gardens		

International career^{‡}
2010–	Cayman Islands	9	(0)
- * Club domestic league appearances and goals ‡ National team caps and goals as of 06:32, 11 April 2012 (UTC)

Andre Jerome McFarlane (born 1 November 1989) is a Caymanian footballer who plays as a defender. He has represented the Cayman Islands during a World Cup qualifying match in 2011.
