= Justin Pierre (footballer) =

Caymanian footballer

Personal information
- Full name: Justin Pierre
- Date of birth: 13 September 1981 (age 45)
- Place of birth: Cayman Islands
- Position: Forward

Team information
- Current team: George Town SC

Senior career*
Years	Team	Apps	(Gls)
2001–2004	Louisville Cardinals	63	(4)
2007–	George Town SC		

International career^{‡}
2004	Cayman Islands	1	(0)
- * Club domestic league appearances and goals ‡ National team caps and goals as of 16:55, 20 April 2012 (UTC)

Justin Pierre (born 13 September 1981) is a Caymanian footballer who plays as a forward. He has represented the Cayman Islands at full international level.
