= Bodden Town (district) =

Coordinates: 19.2804°N 81.2540°W

Bodden Town is the largest district in the Cayman Islands, a British overseas territory. It is located on the south-central coast of the island of Grand Cayman, the largest island in the Cayman Islands. It served as the former capital of the island. It takes its name from the village of Bodden Town, which is located in the central portion of the district, on the south shore of the Grand Cayman island. The district is home to several attractions including the Mission House from the 18th-century, and the Pirate's Caves with its system of underground tunnels and caves. The coastline features beaches and the surrounding reef system that serves as home to the island's marine biodiversity.

== History ==
Boden Town was the first permanent settlement established on the island by the Europeans during the early development of the Grand Cayman island. It served as the capital of the Cayman Islands since the early occupation till the early 20th century. The district's name is derived from the village of Bodden Town, which was named after an individual called William Bodden, who was an early government leader in the region. The Mission House built in the 18th century CE, served as a base for Christian missionaries, and teachers, and has been preserved as a heritage site. The Pirate's caves is a series of caves and underground tunnels associated with local lore of pirates and hidden treasures.

== Geography ==
Bodden Town is centrally located on the southern coast of Grand Cayman, the largest district of the Cayman Islands. It is situated about 20 km (12 mi) from the capital George Town. The island is surrounded by a reef system, that serves as home to marine biodiversity. The topography of Bodden Town is generally flat and low-lying, characteristic of Grand Cayman, which is a relatively flat island formed by erections from the sea bed. The eroded low-lying coastline is interspersed with sandy beaches and rocky terrain with an average altitude 6 m (20 ft). The climate is tropical, with warm temperatures year-round and distinct wet and dry seasons.

== Demographics ==
Bodden Town is the largest district in the Cayman Islands by population. As of the 2021 Census, Bodden Town had a population of 14,845 inhabitants. Being a major town, it hosts cultural and commercial establishments.
