= Luigi Hernandez =

Caymanian footballer (born 1993)

Personal information
- Full name: Luigi Malcolm Hernandez
- Date of birth: 27 February 1993 (age 33)
- Place of birth: Cayman Islands
- Height: 6 ft 2 in (1.88 m)
- Position: Defender

Team information
- Current team: Wroughton FC

Senior career*
Years	Team	Apps	(Gls)
2009–	Bodden Town FC	220	(50)
2010–2011	Ashford Town (Middlesex)	30	(5)
2012	Evesham Town (Loan from Forest green)	25	(0)
2015	Swindon Supermarine	12	(0)

International career^{‡}
2011	Cayman Islands Under-23's	6	(0)
2009–	Cayman Islands	12	(1)
- * Club domestic league appearances and goals as of 23:48, 8 April 2012 (UTC) ‡ National team caps and goals as of 23:48, 8 April 2012 (UTC)

Luigi Malcolm Hernandez (born 27 February 1993) is a Caymanian footballer who plays as a defender. He represented the Cayman Islands at the 2010 Caribbean Championship and in World Cup qualifying matches in 2011.

He was one of a group of Caymanian players identified by the country's football federation who they believed would benefit from playing overseas. He joined Ashford Town (Middlesex) in England after being invited over in late 2010 on an initial short-term basis, although the move was extended then until the end of the season. He initially played for the club as a youth player but moved up to play for the first team, making thirty appearances.

In February 2012 he impressed visiting staff from Swindon Town and returned to England for further assessment by staff from the club. He then joined Evesham Town playing twenty five league games for the club.
