= Football in the Cayman Islands =

- Country: Cayman Islands
- Governing body: Cayman Islands Football Association
- National team: Men's national team; Women's national team

National competitions
- Cayman Islands League

International competitions
- CONCACAF Champions League; CONCACAF League; Caribbean Club Shield; FIFA Club World Cup; CONCACAF Gold Cup (National Team); CONCACAF Nations League (National Team); FIFA World Cup (National Team); CONCACAF Women's Championship (National Team); FIFA Women's World Cup (National Team)

Association football – commonly known as football (or soccer in the United States and Canada) – is a popular sport in Cayman Islands. The Cayman Islands Football Association – the territory's football governing body – organizes the Men's and Women's national teams and administers the territory's professional league the Cayman Islands League. As members of Caribbean Football Union teams are eligible for the Caribbean Club Championship and the territory's membership in CONCACAF allows teams to participate in that organizations club and national team competitions. The Cayman Islands are also a member of FIFA and is therefore eligible to play in the World Cup.

== History ==
Modern football in the Cayman Islands is generally attributed to the efforts of local school teacher, and later principal, Timothy McField in the late 50s and early 1960s. With the help of a road builder named Mike Simmons, the two constructed the islands first competitive pitch, known originally as the Annex, from swamp land near the school in George Town. The field played host to Jamaica the day after it was completed.

The territory's football governing body, the Cayman Islands Football Association, was founded in 1966 and became an associate member of CONCACAF in 1988, gaining full membership in 1990. The national team made its CONCACAF debut in the 1991 Caribbean Cup. The territory joined FIFA in 1992 and played their first World Cup qualifying match at home against Cuba on 11 November 1996, losing 0–1.

=== FIFA corruption case ===
Jeffrey Webb, Former president of CONCACAF, Cayman Islands Football Association (CIFA), and FIFA vice president, was arrested for corruption charges on 27 May 2015 by Swiss police acting at the request of the U.S. Department of Justice on charges of racketeering, wire fraud and money laundering conspiracy. In May 2015, he was banned by FIFA Ethics Committee. After originally pleading not guilty to the charges, he pleaded guilty in November 2015.

== League system ==
Professional football in the Cayman Islands is organized by the national federation and currently consists of two leagues. The Cayman Islands Premier League has been the highest level of football in the territory since it was first organized for the 1970–1971 season with the Cayman Islands Division One comprising the second tier. The system has a hierarchical format with promotion and relegation between the leagues.

Level	Leagues/Divisions
1	Cayman Islands Premier League; 10 clubs
	↓↑ 1-2 clubs
2	Division One; 12 clubs

== National stadium ==
The Truman Bodden Stadium in George Town seats 3,000.
