= Theron Wood =

Caymanian footballer (born 1990)

Personal information
- Full name: Theron Magnus Wood
- Date of birth: 7 February 1990 (age 36)
- Place of birth: Cayman Islands
- Position: Forward

Team information
- Current team: Bodden Town

Senior career*
| Years | Team | Apps | (Gls) |
| 2008–2010 | Bodden Town | | |
| 2010–2012 | Ashford Town | 13 | |
| 2012 | Evesham Town | 1 | (0) |
| 2012– | Bodden Town | | (34+) |

International career^{‡}
- Cayman Islands U17
- Cayman Islands U20
| 2011 | Cayman Islands U23 | 3 | (0) |
| 2008– | Cayman Islands | 22 | (1) |
- * Club domestic league appearances and goals as of 11 July 2020 ‡ National team caps and goals as of 13 March 2023

Theron Magnus Wood (born 7 February 1990) is a Caymanian footballer who plays as a forward for Bodden Town and the Cayman Islands national team.

He represented the Cayman Islands at the 2010 Caribbean Championship and in World Cup qualifying matches in 2011.

== Club career ==
Wood was one of a group of Caymanian players identified by the country's football federation who they believed would benefit from playing overseas. He joined Ashford Town (Middlesex) in England after being invited over in late 2010 on an initial short term basis, although the move was extended then until the end of the season. He made his first-team debut for the club in late January 2012 going on to make a total of 13 appearances.

He returned to England in March 2012 joining Evesham Town on trial, playing one league game for the club.

== Career statistics ==
As of match played 8 June 2021

Appearances and goals by national team and year
| National team | Year | Apps | Goals |
|---|---|---|---|
| Cayman Islands | 2008 | 1 | 0 |
| Cayman Islands | 2009 | 1 | 0 |
| Cayman Islands | 2010 | 3 | 1 |
| Cayman Islands | 2011 | 6 | 0 |
| Cayman Islands | 2012 | 0 | 0 |
| Cayman Islands | 2013 | 0 | 0 |
| Cayman Islands | 2014 | 0 | 0 |
| Cayman Islands | 2015 | 0 | 0 |
| Cayman Islands | 2016 | 0 | 0 |
| Cayman Islands | 2017 | 0 | 0 |
| Cayman Islands | 2018 | 1 | 0 |
| Cayman Islands | 2019 | 8 | 0 |
| Cayman Islands | 2020 | 0 | 0 |
| Cayman Islands | 2021 | 2 | 0 |
| Total | | 22 | 1 |

Scores and results list Cayman Islands' goal tally first, score column indicates score after each Wood goal.

List of international goals scored by Theron Wood
| No. | Date | Venue | Opponent | Score | Result | Competition |
|---|---|---|---|---|---|---|
| 1 | 4 October 2010 | Juan Ramón Loubriel Stadium, Bayamón, Puerto Rico | Anguilla | 3–1 | 4–1 | 2010 Caribbean Cup qualification |
