= Jermaine Brown (footballer, born 1985) =

Caymanian footballer

Personal information
- Full name: Jermaine Brown
- Date of birth: 22 March 1985 (age 41)
- Place of birth: Cayman Islands
- Position: Goalkeeper

Team information
- Current team: Scholars International

Senior career*
Years	Team	Apps	(Gls)
2007–	Scholars International		

International career^{‡}
2008–	Cayman Islands	8	(0)
- * Club domestic league appearances and goals ‡ National team caps and goals as of 17:54, 8 April 2012 (UTC)

Jermaine Brown (born 22 March 1985) is a Caymanian footballer who plays as a goalkeeper. He represented the Cayman Islands including in a World Cup qualifying match in 2011 and twice at the 2010 Caribbean Championship.
