= The Annex, Grand Cayman =

The Annex, Grand Cayman is an artificial football ground in George Town, Grand Cayman, Cayman Islands. It is also known as Timothy Mcfield Football Field. It is the home of many football clubs in Grand Cayman, including Cayman Athletic Sports Club and George Town SC.

Its capacity is just over 2.500 with a stand on the East side of the stadium. The Annex Playfield has a length of 0.42 km. It is a 2 star FIFA (Fédération Internationale de Football Association) approved field and the Cayman Islands youth teams use as well as the pro senior league, (Cayman Islands League).
