= Cayman Islands FA Cup =

Association football tournament in Cayman Islands

- Organizer(s): Cayman Islands Football Association
- Founded: 1970
- Current champion: Scholars International
- Most championships: Scholars International; Bodden Town FC
- 2023 Cayman Island FA Cup

The Cayman Islands FA Cup is the top knockout tournament of the Cayman Islands football. The cup was first known as the Schlitz Beer Cup and was donated by Jacques Scott. It was retired by Saprissa FC, the title holders from 1972 to 1974, and was renamed as the CIFA FA Cup.

== Winners ==
=== Schlitz Beer Cup ===
- 1970/71 : Scotia
- 1971/72 : Saprissa
- 1972/73 : Saprissa
- 1973/74 : Saprissa

=== CIFA FA Cup ===
- 1974–1995 : Not held
- 1995–96 : East End United
- 1996–97 Not known
- 1997–98 : George Town
- 1998–99 Not known
- 1999–00 Not known
- 2000–01 : Bodden Town
- 2001–02 : George Town 4–0 Scholars International
- 2002–03 : Scholars International 2–1 Bodden Town
- 2003–04 : Latinos 2–1 George Town
- 2004–05 : Western Union FC 2–0 Scholars International
- 2005–06 : Scholars International 2–0 Money Express
- 2006–07 : Latinos 3–0 Elite
- 2007–08 : Scholars International 1–0 Elite
- 2008–09 : Bodden Town 3–1 Elite
- 2009–10 : George Town 1–0 Tigers
- 2010–11 : George Town 5–0 Cayman Athletic
- 2011–12 : Scholars International 1–0 George Town
- 2012–13 : Bodden Town 3–2 Roma United
- 2013–14 : Elite 1–0 Roma United
- 2014–15: Cayman Athletic 3–2 Elite
- 2015–16 : Elite 2–0 Bodden Town
- 2016–17 : Bodden Town 2–1 Academy
- 2017–18 : Academy 1–0 Elite
- 2018–19 : Elite 1–1 Academy (3–1 pen)
- 2019–20 : Not held due to COVID–19
- 2020–21 : Bodden Town 1–1 Academy (5–4 pen)
- 2022 : Scholars International 4–1 Sunset
- 2022–23 : Academy 2–2 Elite (7–6 pen)
- 2023–24 : Academy 4–1 Elite
