= Carlos Escobar (footballer, born 1978) =

Honduran footballer (born 1978)

Carlos Escobar Flores
Personal information
- Full name: Carlos Alberto Escobar Flores
- Date of birth: 27 February 1978 (age 48)
- Place of birth: Honduras
- Position: Goalkeeper

Senior career*
Years	Team	Apps	(Gls)
- Victoria
- Scholars International SC
- * Club domestic league appearances and goals

Carlos Alberto Escobar Flores (born 27 February 1978) is a Honduran former footballer who played as a goalkeeper.
