= Ron Douglas =

Caymanian footballer (born 1980)

Chris Douglas
Personal information
- Full name: Ron Christopher Douglas
- Date of birth: 28 August 1980 (age 46)
- Place of birth: Cayman Islands
- Position: Defender

International career^{‡}
Years	Team	Apps	(Gls)
2008–	Cayman Islands	10	(0)
- ‡ National team caps and goals as of 07:53, 11 April 2012 (UTC)

Ron Christopher "Chris" Douglas (born 28 August 1980) is a Caymanian footballer who plays as a defender. He has represented the Cayman Islands during World Cup qualifying match in 2010.
