= Western Union FC =

Association football club in Cayman Islands

WD United
- Full name: WD United
- Founded: 1996
- Ground: The Annex; George Town, Cayman Islands
- Capacity: 2,500
- League: Cayman Islands League
- 2006: Expelled
Home colours

WD United was a Cayman Islander football club based in George Town, which formerly played in Cayman Islands's first division.

The club was founded in 1996 and played as Western Union FC before changing its name in 2005/06 to Money Express.

During the 2006/07 season the club changed its name from Money Express to WD United. The club was expelled from league for not showing for a match for a second time during the season. All their results were annulled and as a sanction they were permitted to re-register to CIFA until the end of the 2007/08 season.

== Achievements ==
- Cayman Islands League: 2

1999/2000, 2004/05

- Cayman Islands FA Cup: 1

2004/05
