= Cayman Islands First Division =

- Country: (Cayman Islands) CIFA
- Confederation: CONCACAF
- Number of clubs: 10
- Level on pyramid: 2
- Promotion to: Premier League
- Relegation to: Second Division (formerly)
- Domestic cup: Cayman Islands FA Cup
- Current champions: Tigers FC (2023/2024)
- Website: Website

The Cayman Islands First Division is the second-tier league of football in the Cayman Islands. It is organized by the Cayman Islands Football Association.

== Format ==
The league consists of ten clubs. The first-place team each season is automatically promoted to the Cayman Islands Premier League while the runner-up plays against the ninth-best club in the Premier League in a play-off. There was formerly promotion/relegation between the First Division and the third-tier Second Division but the Second Division was merged with the First Division in January 2025.

== History ==
Formerly, the league was known as the Foster's First Division for sponsorship reasons. The First Division was revived in 2020 after being suspended for four years. During the 2019/2020 season, the Premier League was divided into two divisions and the six lowest ranked teams would compete in the First Division upon its return the following season.

== List of winners ==
Season	Champions	Ref.
2020/21	Scholars International "B"	
2022	Roma United SC	
2022/23	345 FC	
2023/24	Tigers FC	
