= Ed Bush Stadium =

Stadium in the Cayman Islands

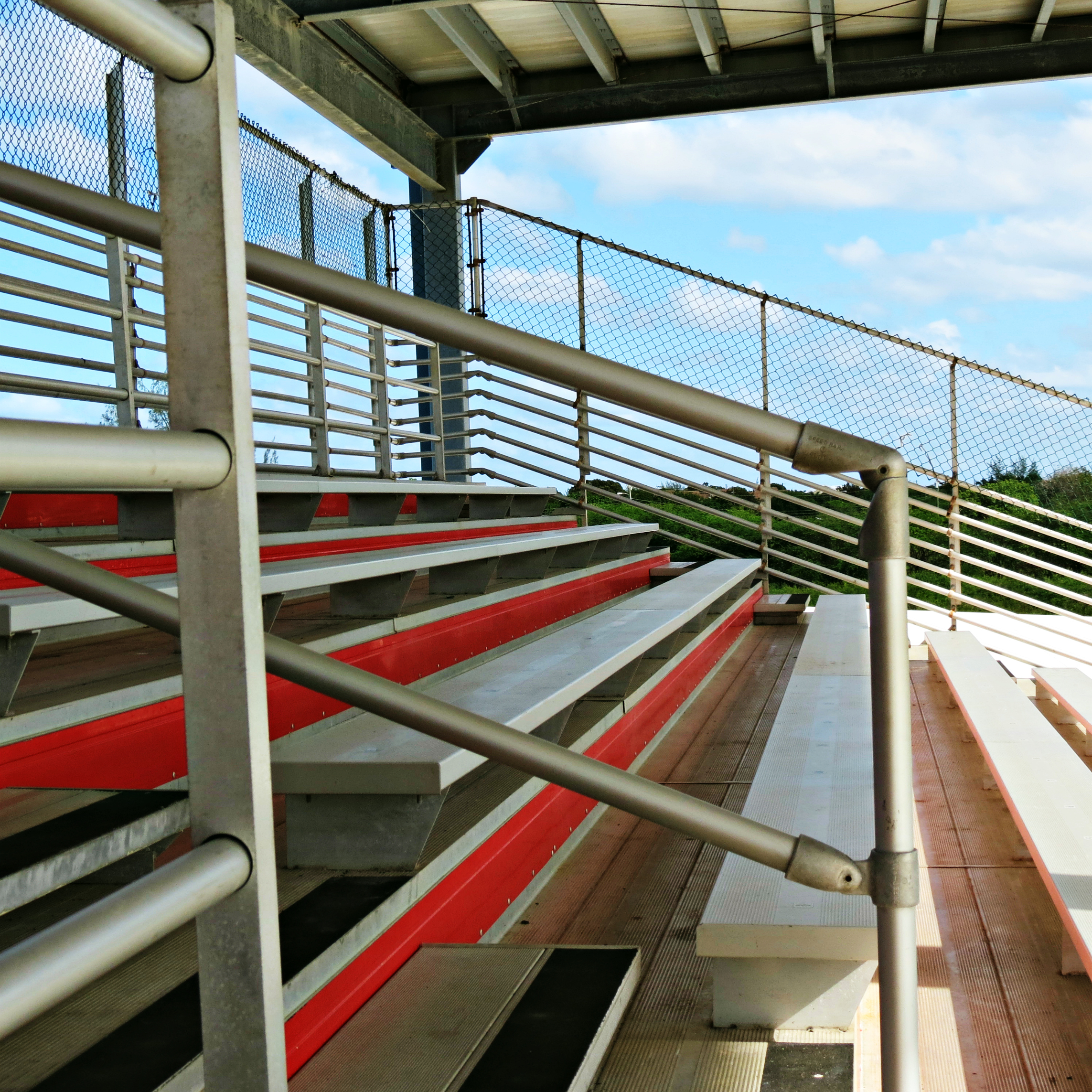
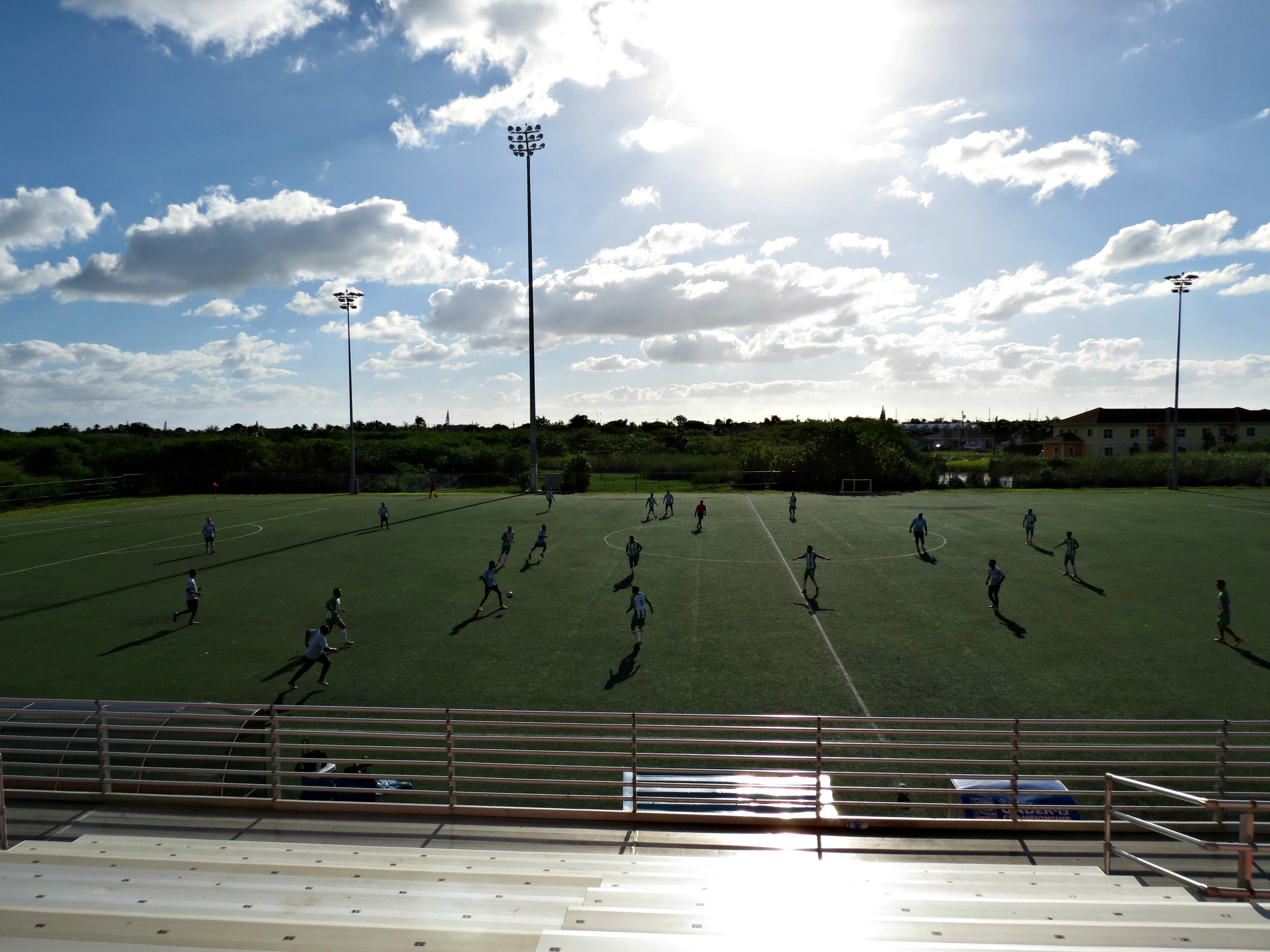
- Ed Bush Stadium in 2014
- Interactive map of Ed Bush Stadium
- Location: Cayman Islands
- Coordinates: 19.313299°N 81.254601°W
- Capacity: 2,500
- Surface: Grass

Construction
- Opened: 1994

The Ed Bush Stadium is an multi-sport stadium in West Bay, Cayman Islands, used mostly as an association football venue. The stadium is one of the venues for the Cayman Islands Premier League and has hosted matches of the Cayman Islands national football team.

== Gallery ==
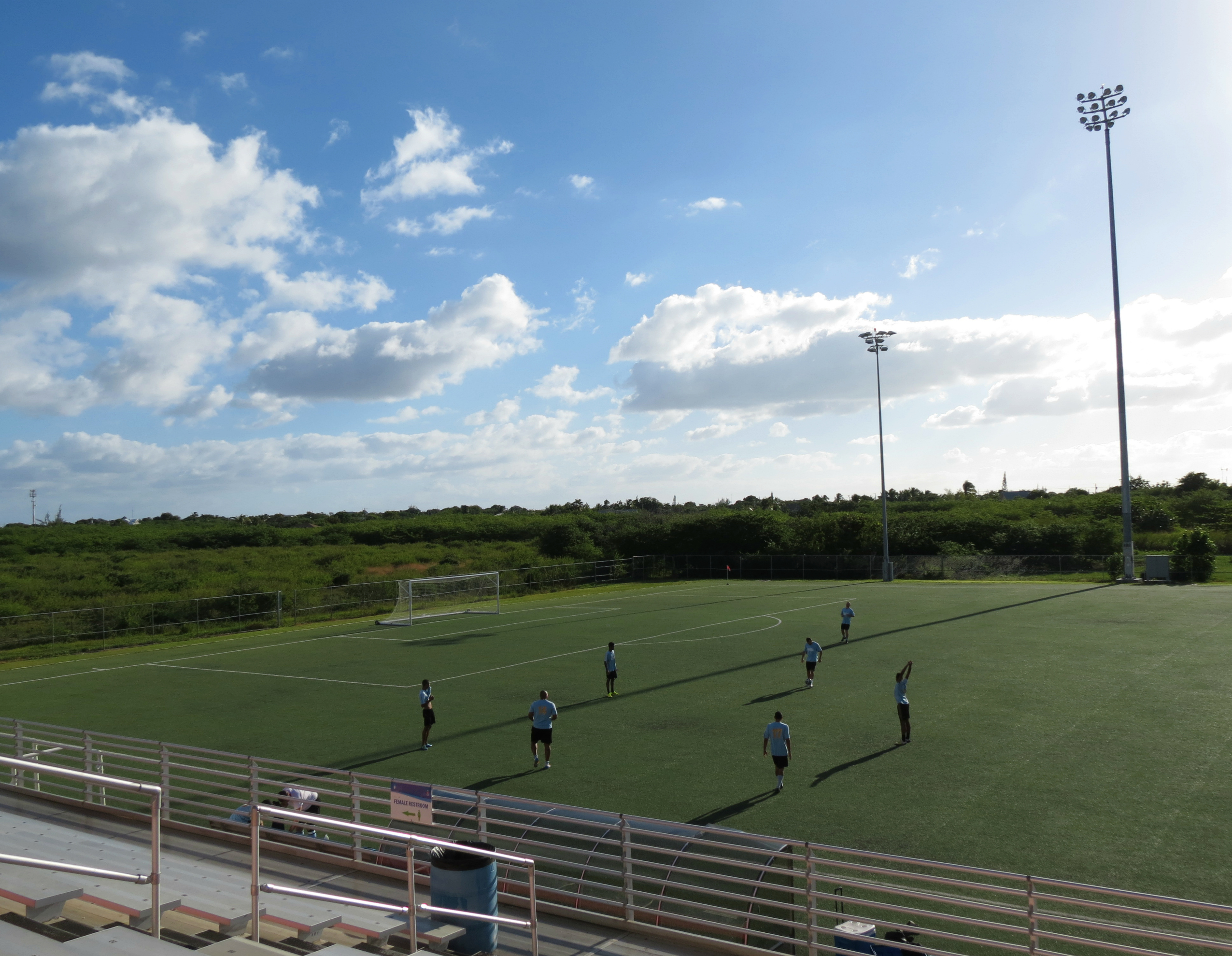

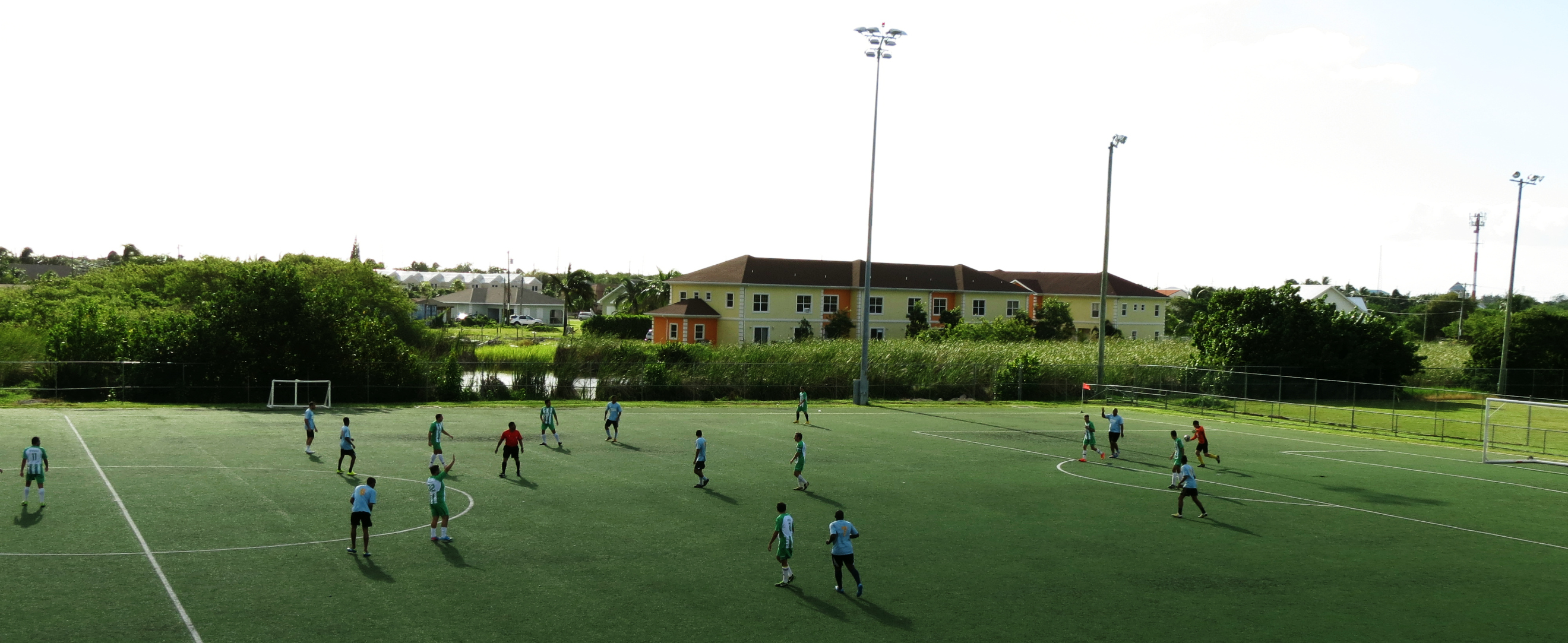

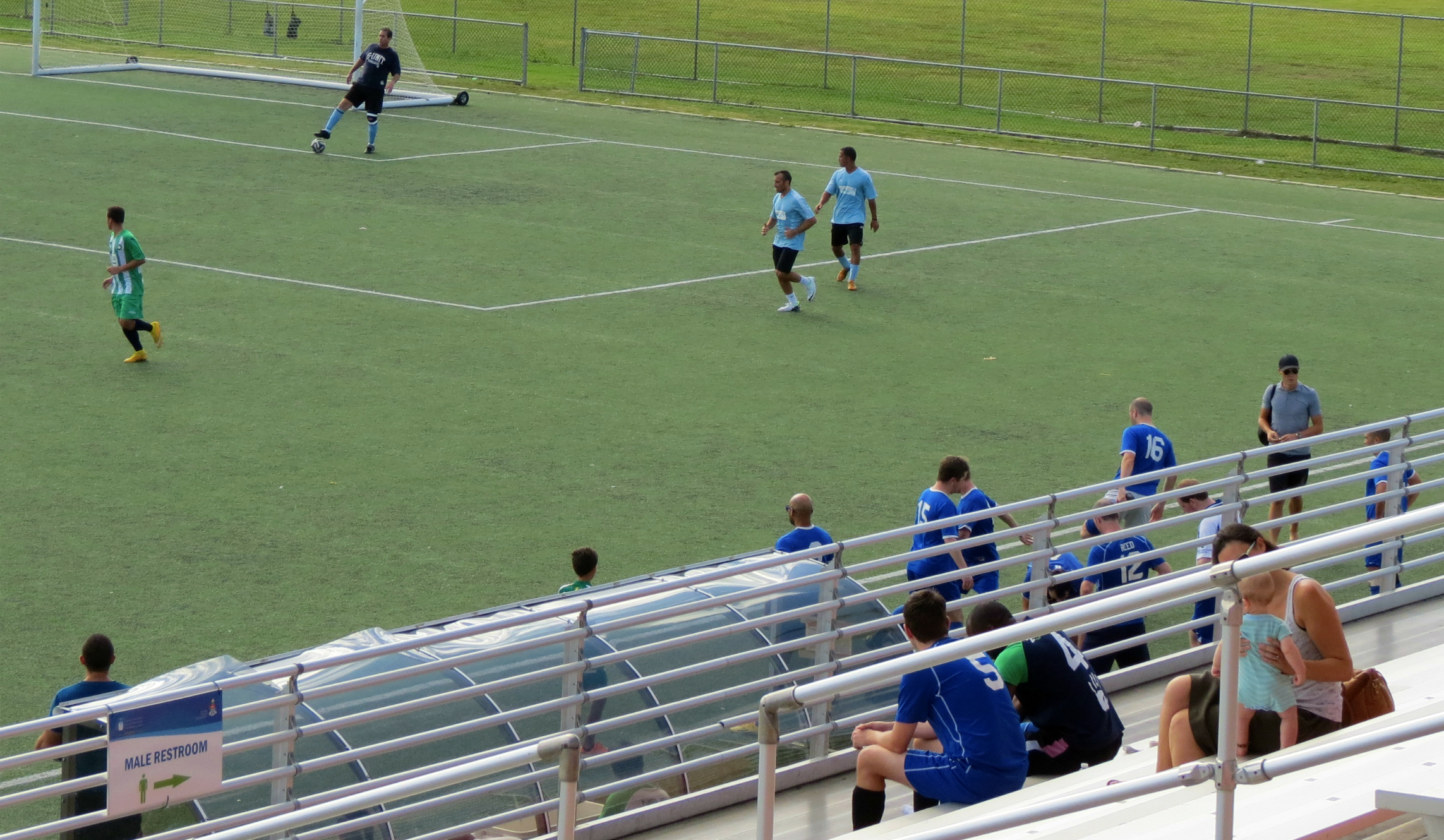
