= Truman Bodden Sports Complex =

Sports venue in the Cayman Islands

Truman Bodden Stadium
- Truman Bodden Stadium
- Interactive map of Truman Bodden Stadium
- Full name: Truman Bodden Sports Complex
- Location: George Town, Grand Cayman
- Coordinates: 19°16′43″N 81°22′59″W
- Owner: Government of the Cayman Islands
- Operator: Cayman Islands Football Association (CIFA)
- Capacity: 3,000
- Surface: Grass
- Field size: 100 x 70 yards

Construction
- Opened: 1995
- Renovated: 2005–2007

Tenants
- Cayman Islands national football team (1995–present); Cayman Swim Team(present); Cayman Track Team (present); Cayman Islands national rugby union team (present)

Truman Bodden Sports Complex is a multi-use complex in George Town, Cayman Islands. It is named after Truman Bodden, a former Caymanian politician. The complex is separated into an outdoor, 6-lane 25-metre swimming pool, full purpose track and field and basketball/netball courts. The field surrounded by the track is used for football matches as well as other field sports. The track-and-football stadium holds 3,000 people.

The Cayman Islands national football team plays its international matches at the track-and-football stadium in the complex. Truman Bodden is used for summer football camps for international teams that are scouting for local players.

== History ==
=== History of the stadium before 2005 ===
The Truman Bodden Sports Complex was opened in 1995.

==== 1995 Caribbean Cup ====
The Truman Bodden held its first international match in the 1995 Caribbean Cup semi-finals, which saw Saint Vincent and the Grenadines win 3-2 against Cuba. Other games from the same tournament that the Truman Bodden hosted was the other semi final match (Cayman Islands 2-9 Trinidad and Tobago), the third place match (Cayman Islands 0-3 Cuba), and the final (Trinidad and Tobago 5-0 Saint Vincent and the Grenadines).

=== 2005-08: Renovation ===
The stadium was renovated between 2005-07, and in 2008, construction commenced on a 10-lane 50-metre pool and a facility that would hold 2,000 people. A multimedia centre was built into the pool facility as well as offices, conference rooms and a full gym.

=== 2008-present: Later history ===
Truman Bodden Sports Complex hosted the inaugural Cayman Invitational Meeting on May 9, 2012.

== See also ==
- List of rugby league stadiums by capacity
- List of rugby union stadiums by capacity
