= North Side SC =

Association football club in Cayman Islands

- Founded: 1980
- Ground: T.E. McField Sports Centre, George Town, Cayman Islands
- Capacity: 2,500
- League: Cayman Islands First Division
- 2013–14: Cayman Premier League, 8th (relegated)

North Side SC is a football club based in George Town, Cayman Islands, which currently plays in the Cayman Islands League First Division after being relegated from the Premier League in 2014. Its home stadium is the 2,500-capacity T.E. McField Sports Centre.
