= T.E. McField Sports Centre =

Sports stadium in Cayman Islands

T.E. Mcfield Sports Centre
- Interactive map of T.E. Mcfield Sports Centre
- Location: George Town, the Cayman Islands
- Coordinates: 19.2987°N 81.3767°W
- Capacity: 2,500
- Field size: 110yd x 70yd

Tenants
- George Town SC; Sunset FC

The T.E. Mcfield Sports Centre is a football stadium in George Town, Cayman Islands.
