= Cayman Islands Premier League =

Association football league in Cayman Islands

Cayman Islands League
- Founded: 1970
- Country: Cayman Islands
- Confederation: CONCACAF, CFU
- Number of clubs: 10
- Level on pyramid: 1
- Relegation to: First Division
- Domestic cup: Cayman Islands FA Cup
- International cup: CFU Club Shield
- Current champions: Elite SC (2025–26)
- Most championships: Scholars International (16 titles)
- Top scorer: Dwayne Wright (97 goals)
- Website: Official website
- Current: 2026–27 Cayman Islands Premier League

The Cayman Islands League is the top football league in the Cayman Islands, created in 1980. Despite being a league competition in CONCACAF since 1992, no team participated in the CFU Club Championship until the 2010 CFU Club Championship, where Elite SC entered.

== Clubs ==
Club	Position in 2018–19	Location
Academy	4th	George Town
Bodden Town	1st, Champions	Bodden Town
East End United	10th	East End
Elite	3rd	West Bay
Future	7th	West Bay
George Town	9th	George Town
Latinos	5th	George Town
Roma United	8th	George Town
Scholars International	2nd	West Bay
Sunset	6th	George Town

== Champions ==
Season	Champion
1970–71	B-Rite Stars
1971–72	B-Rite Stars
1972–73	Saprissa FC
1973–74	Unknown
1975–1978	Unknown
1979–80	Yama Sun Oil
1980–81	Yama Sun Oil
1981–82	Unknown
1982–83	St. George's
1983–84	Mont Joly
1985–1996	Unknown
1996–97	George Town SC
1997–98	Scholars International FC
1998–99	George Town SC
1999–00	Western Union FC
2000–01	Scholars International FC
2001–02	George Town SC
2002–03	Scholars International FC
2003–04	Latinos FC
2004–05	Western Union FC
2005–06	Scholars International FC
2006–07	Scholars International FC
2007–08	Scholars International FC
2008–09	Elite SC
2009–10	Scholars International FC
2010–11	Elite SC
2011–12	Scholars International FC
2012–13	Bodden Town FC
2013–14	Bodden Town FC
2014–15	Scholars International FC
2015–16	Scholars International FC
2016–17	Bodden Town FC
2017–18	Scholars International FC
2018–19	Scholars International FC
2019–20	Bodden Town FC
2020–21	Scholars International
2021–22	Scholars International
2022–23	Scholars International
2023–24	Scholars International
2024–25	Elite SC
2025–26	Elite SC

== Performance by club ==
Club	Winners	Winning years
Scholars International SC	16	1998, 2001, 2003, 2006, 2007, 2008, 2010, 2012, 2015, 2016, 2018, 2019, 2021, 2022, 2023, 2024
Bodden Town FC	4	2013, 2014, 2017, 2020
Elite SC	4	2009, 2011, 2025, 2026
George Town SC	3	1997, 1999, 2002
B-Rite Stars ^{†}	2	1971, 1972
Yama Sun Oil SC	2	1979, 1980
Western Union FC ^{†}	2	2000, 2005
Saprissa FC ^{†}	1	1973
St. George's ^{†}	1	1983
Mont Joly ^{†}	1	1984
Latinos FC	1	2004

- ^{†} indicates clubs that no longer exist or disaffiliated.

== Individual statistics ==
=== Top goalscorers ===
Season	Player	Club	Goals
2000–01	(Jamaica) Anthony Fogarty	George Town	21
2001–02	(Cayman Islands) Gary Whittaker	George Town	23
2002–03	(Cayman Islands) Gary Whittaker	Scholars International	11
2003–04	(Cayman Islands) Michael Wilks	George Town	12
2006–07	(Honduras) Carlos Powery	Tigers	30
2009–10	(Cayman Islands) Tex Whitelocke	George Town	13
2010–11	(Cayman Islands) Dwayne Wright	Elite	18
2011–12	(Cayman Islands) Dwayne Wright	Elite	20
2012–13	(Cayman Islands) Dwayne Wright	Bodden Town	21
2013–14	(Cayman Islands) Theron Wood	Bodden Town	28
2017–18	(Cayman Islands) Christopher Reeves	Elite	15
2018–19	(Cayman Islands) Christopher Reeves	Elite	22
2019–20	(Cayman Islands) Christopher Reeves	Elite	13
2019–20	Kimani Finn	Scholars International	13
2020–21	(Cayman Islands) Jonah Ebanks	Scholars International	21
2022–23	(Jamaica) Nicholay Finlayson	Roma United	17
2023–24	(Cayman Islands) Jonah Ebanks	345	18
2024–25	(Cayman Islands) Christopher Reeves	Elite	20
2025-26	Christopher Brown	Scholars International	21

Most time top goalscorer

- 4 times.
  - Chris Reeves (2017-18, 2018–19, 2019–20 and 2024–25).
- Most goals by a player in a single season:
- 30 goals.
  - (Honduras) Carlos Powery (2006–07).

=== Multiple hat-tricks ===
Rank	Country	Player	Hat-tricks
1	(Cayman Islands)	Chris Reeves	11
2	(Cayman Islands)	Jonah Ebanks	2
3	(Cayman Islands)	Keigel Atkinson	1
3	(Cayman Islands)	Chris Brown	1
3	(Cayman Islands)	Mark Ebanks	1
3	(Cayman Islands)	Fabian Malcolm	1
3	(Honduras)	Carlos Powery	1
3	(Cayman Islands)	Kirk Rowe	1
3	(Cayman Islands)	Steven Wellington	1
3	(Cayman Islands)	Tex Whitelock	1

== Women's League ==
=== Top goalscorers ===
Season	Player	Team	Goals
2021	(Cayman Islands) Chloe Bentik-Lalli		26
2023–24	(Cayman Islands) Nesah Godet	Academy	24
