= Future SC =

Association football club in the Cayman Islands

- Founded: 1998; 28 years ago
- Ground: Ed Bush Stadium
- Capacity: 2,500
- League: Cayman Islands Premier League
- 2025–26: 10th

Future SC is an association football club from the West Bay, Cayman Islands that currently competes in the Cayman Islands First Division.

== History ==
The club was founded as FC Future in 1998.
