= Bodden Town (village) =

Village in Cayman Islands

- Town
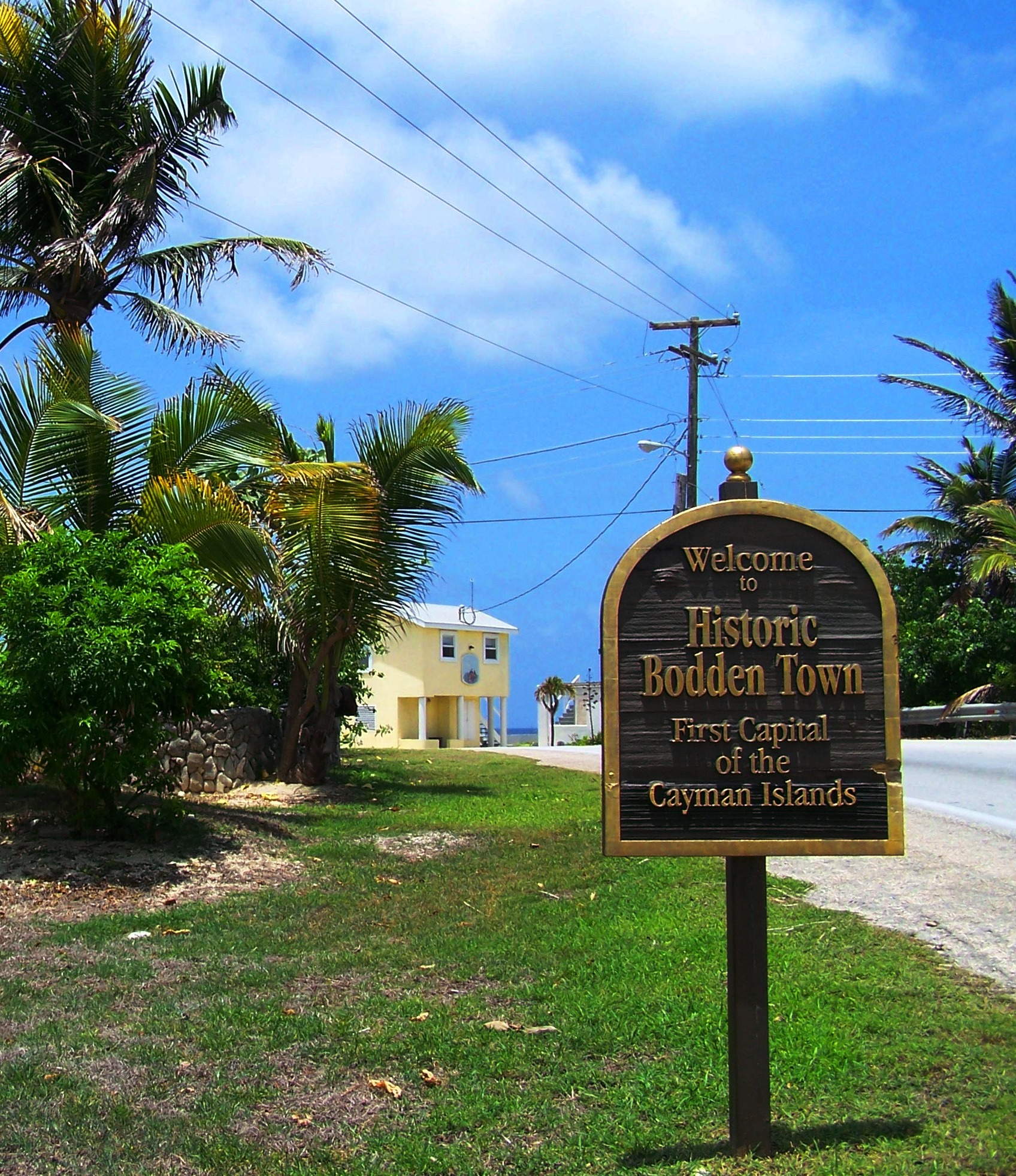
- Welcome sign at entrance to Bodden Town, Grand Cayman

- Location within Cayman Islands
- Coordinates: 19°17′00″N 81°15′00″W
- Country: United Kingdom
- Overseas Territory: Cayman Islands
- Island: Grand Cayman
- Elevation: 33 ft (10 m)

Population (2025)
  - Total: 16,576
- Time zone: UTC-05:00 (EST)

Bodden Town is the former capital of the Cayman Islands and the largest district in the territory. It is situated on a natural harbour and a coral reef. The first settlement was named after a government leader, William Bodden. Once ravaged by pirates, this village is known for its remains of a 4 mi (6 km) wall and cannon. Bodden Town has a population of 16,576 (2025 census). Its top attractions include the Mission House, which features the lifestyle of early Caymanian settlers. Bodden Town is also considered the fastest growing district in the islands in terms of resident population.

== Education ==
The Cayman Islands Education Department operates Bodden Town Primary School and Savannah Primary School as well as the International College of the Cayman Islands, a non-profit institution of higher learning accredited by the Accrediting Council for Independent Colleges and Schools to offer associate, bachelor's and master's degrees.

== Politics ==
The politics of Bodden Town are dominated by the moderate PACT Government coalition, who have a ‘Caymanian first’ and limited immigration stance. The Premier of the Cayman Islands, Wayne Panton’s constituency, Newlands, is located in Bodden Town (district).

== Sports ==
Spectator sports available in Bodden Town include the Bodden Town FC.
