= Latinos FC =

Association football club in Cayman Islands

Latinos F.C.
- Full name: Latinos Football Club
- Short name: LFC
- Founded: 1982
- Ground: Various
- League: Cayman Islands Premier League
- 2025–26: 11th

Latinos Football Club is a Cayman Islands professional football club based in George Town, which currently plays in the Cayman Islands Premier League.

== History ==
Latinos FC had their first major success in 2003/04 when they won both the Cayman Islands Premier League and the Cayman Islands FA Cup. In 2008/09 season, the team disbanded and dropped to the CIFA Fosters First Division for the 2009/10 season.

== Achievements ==
- CIFA Fosters First Division

2015/16

- Cayman Islands Premier League

2003/04

- Cayman Islands FA Cup

2003/04, 2006/07
