= Scholars International SC =

Association football club in Cayman Islands

- Full name: Scholars International Sports Club
- Founded: 1978
- Ground: Ed Bush Stadium
- Capacity: 2,500
- League: Cayman Premier League
- 2025-26: Cayman Premier League, 3rd of 10
Home colours	Away colours

Scholars International Sports Club is a professional football club based in West Bay, Cayman Islands, which currently plays in the Cayman Premier League.

== Squad (2025) ==
2024 CFU Club Shield

Note: Flags indicate national team as defined under FIFA eligibility rules; some limited exceptions apply. Players may hold more than one non-FIFA nationality.

No.	Pos.	Nation	Player
—	GK	CAY	Jermaine Brown
—	GK	HON	Carlos Escobar
—	DF	CAY	Romeo Thomas
—	DF	CAY	Maynor Rodríguez
—	DF	POR	Joao Pimenta
—	DF	JAM	Jermaine Haughton
—	DF	HON	Jorge Murillo
—	DF	HON	Bob Connor
—	DF	IRI	Davoud Parhami
—	MF	CAY	Oneil Taylor
—	MF	CAY	Matthew Suberan 8
—	MF	CAY	Colin Rowe
—	MF	CAY	Mario Watler
—	MF	CAY	D'Andre Rowe

No.	Pos.	Nation	Player
—	MF	CAY	Terrance Thomas
—	MF	JAM	Dwight Dunk
—	MF	CAY	Jordan Bonilla
—	MF	HON	Raúl García
—	MF	JAM	Damalay Howell
—	FW	CAY	Ron Douglas
—	FW	CAY	Leon Whittaker
—	FW	CAY	Nikolai Hill
—	FW	CAY	Jorel Bellafonte
—	FW	CAY	Rodrick Pearson
—	FW	HON	Rolly Bodden
—	FW	AFG	Danial Saberi

== Achievements ==
- Cayman Islands League: 16

1997–98, 2000–01, 2002–03, 2005–06, 2006–07, 2007–08, 2009–10, 2011–12, 2014–15, 2015–16, 2017–18, 2018–19, 2020–21, 2021–22, 2022–23, 2023–24

- Cayman Islands FA Cup: 5

2002–03, 2005–06, 2007–08, 2011–12, 2022

- Cayman Islands Digicel Cup: 2

2006–07, 2012–13

== Performance in CONCACAF competitions ==
Competition	Round	Country	Club	Home	Away	Aggregate
1991 CONCACAF Champions' Cup (Caribbean Zone)	First round	Jamaica	Black Lions	1–1	1–0	2–1
1991 CONCACAF Champions' Cup (Caribbean Zone)	Second round	Trinidad and Tobago	Defence Force	0–1	0–6	0–7
