= Cayman Islands Football Association =

Governing body of football in the Cayman Islands

CONCACAF
- Short name: CIFA
- Founded: 1966
- Headquarters: Grand Cayman
- FIFA affiliation: 1992
- CONCACAF affiliation: 1992
- President: Alfredo Whittaker
- Website: http://caymanislandsfa.com/

The Cayman Islands Football Association is the governing body of football in the Cayman Islands. The Cayman Islands Football Association governs all National Team programs, youth development leagues, Women's league and the Cayman Islands Men's Premier League.

As of November 2011, the Cayman Islands were ranked 181st, moving up four places in the FIFA world rankings after a 1:1 draw against the Dominican Republic in a 2014 FIFA Brazil World Cup Qualifier.

The Cayman Islands national football team is the national team of the Cayman Islands and is controlled by the Cayman Islands Football Association. It is a member of FIFA and CONCACAF.

== History ==
In 1966, the Cayman Islands Football Association was formed, to administer the sport in the islands, which by then had a growing domestic league. As the game grew, the need for expanding football facilities became evident. In 1982 the Annex Field, originally built by developer Mike Simmons, was further improved. The Ed Bush field was built in West Bay and opened by Elizabeth II on March 6, 1994, followed by a game in which the Cayman Islands beat Jamaica to qualify for the finals of the Shell Caribbean Cup in Trinidad & Tobago. Encouraged by this result, Government agreed a build a new football field.

In 1995, the association presided over the further development of the national sports complex, which was transformed into a modern multi-purpose facility, and renamed the Truman Bodden Sports Complex. On July 30 of that year, the Cayman Islands hosted the Shell Caribbean Cup Finals for the first time. Among the guests were then FIFA President João Havelange and the legendary Brazilian footballer, Pelé. While on this visit, Pele officially opened the Donovan Rankine Field in East End, also built in 1995. The North Side field came in for redesign and upgrade in 1998/1999 and the G. Haig Bodden Playing Field was completed in Bodden Town shortly afterwards.

Following the destruction caused by Hurricane Ivan in 2004, which left nearly all sporting facilities on the islands destroyed or unusable, the Cayman Islands Government launched a $28-million, four-year reconstruction project, which has seen all five district stadiums on Grand Cayman, and the Cayman Brac playing field, redeveloped to international standards. Both the Annex stadium in George Town - now renamed the T. E. McField Sports Centre after its founder - and the Ed Bush Stadium in West Bay are FIFA Two-Star Football Turf facilities, and the Truman Bodden Sports Complex has been reopened as a 3,000 capacity national stadium.

The CIFA now presides over sixteen domestic league and cup competitions at the Under-13 boys, Under-15 boys, Under-17 boys, Under-17 girls, and men's and women's senior levels. In addition to competitions, the CIFA oversees an active calendar of education courses for coaches, referees and administrators, as well as regular camps and training programmes for young players.

The CIFA realised two major achievements in 2009, as the Under-17 women's national team became the first Cayman Islands team to progress to the finals of the regional Concacaf Under-17 Women's Championships, and with the opening of the new CIFA office at the Cayman Centre for Excellence; a long-term development to provide the CIFA with a dedicated training and administration centre. In September 2011 the Cayman Islands National Under-20 Women's Football Team qualified for the next round of the U-20 Women's World Cup after beating Suriname 4:0 and narrowly losing 1:0 to Trinidad & Tobago in the first round of the Caribbean Football Union World Cup Qualifiers.

== Presidents ==
- Allan Moore (1981–1985)
- Ed Bush (1985–1987)
- Allan Moore (1987–1989)
- Tony Scott (1989–1991)
- Jeffrey Webb (1991-2015)
- Lee Ramoon (2016-2017)
- Alfredo Whittaker (2017-; banned for six months)

Name	Position	Source
(Cayman Islands) Alfredo Whittaker	President	
(Cayman Islands) Mark Beckford	Vice-president	
(Cayman Islands) Dion Brandon	2nd Vice-president	
(Brazil) Marcos Tinoco	General secretary	
(Cayman Islands) Armando Ebanks	Treasurer	
(Argentina) Claudio García	Technical director	
(Cayman Islands) Joey Jap Tjong	Team coach (men's)	
(Cayman Islands) Michael Jonhson	Team coach (women's)	
n/a	Media/communications manager	
n/a	Futsal Coordinator	
(Cayman Islands) Peterkin Berry	Chairperson of the Referees Committee	
(Cayman Islands) Livingston Bailey	Head/Director of the Referees Department	
n/a	Referee coordinator	

== Cayman Islands National Team results ==
Men's National Team 2014 FIFA Brazil World Cup Qualifying Results

14/11/11 19:30 Georgetown Cayman Islands 1:1 (0:1) Dominican Republic 11/11/11 15:00 San Cristobal Dominican Republic 4:0 (2:0) Cayman Islands 11/10/11 19:30 San Salvador El Salvador 4:0 (3:0) Cayman Islands 07/10/11 19:30 Georgetown Cayman Islands 0:1 (0:0) Suriname 06/09/11 19:30 Georgetown Cayman Islands 1:4 (0:0) El Salvador 02/09/11 18:00 Paramaribo Suriname 1:0 (1:0) Cayman Islands

Women's U20 National Team CFU World Cup Qualifying Results

15/10/11 15:00 Cayman Islands 2:0 (1:0) Bahamas 18/10/11 18:00 Suriname 0:4 (0:0) Cayman Islands 20/10/11 18:00 Cayman Islands 0:1 (0:0) Trinidad & Tobago
