= East End United FC =

Association football club in Cayman Islands

East End United
- Full name: East End United
- Ground: Donovan Rankine Stadium; East End, Cayman Islands
- Capacity: 1,500
- Manager: Dion Brandon
- League: Cayman Islands League; Premier League
- 2025–2026: 9th
Home colours	Away colours

East End United is a Cayman Islands professional football club based in East End, which currently playing in the Cayman Islands Premier League.

== Achievements ==
Cayman Islands FA Cup

- Winners (1): 1995–96
