= Cayman Athletic SC =

Association football club in Cayman Islands

- Full name: Cayman Athletic Sports Club
- Ground: T.E. McField Sports Centre
- Capacity: 2,500
- League: Cayman Islands League; First Division
- 2025–26: 6th

Cayman Athletic SC is a Cayman Islander football club based in George Town, which currently plays in Cayman Islands' Premier League, having been promoted from the first division in 2011 as champions.
