= Sunset FC =

Association football club in Cayman Islands

Sunset F.C.
- Full name: Sunset Football Club
- Founded: 1982
- Ground: T.E. McField Sports Centre, George Town, Cayman Islands
- Capacity: 2,500
- Manager: Gareth Thacker
- League: Cayman Premier League
- 2025–2026: 7th
Home colours	Away colours

Sunset Football Club is a professional football club based in George Town, Cayman Islands, which currently plays in the Cayman Premier League. Its home stadium is the 2,500-capacity T.E. McField Sports Centre.

== History ==
Sunset Football Club was founded in 1982 and is one of the oldest in the Cayman Islands. The men's team plays in the Cayman Premier League under head coach Alan Purvis. The club runs both boys and girls teams in age groups under 11 to under 19 and has a successful Saturday and Sunday morning academy for both boys and girls for ages 5–10.
