= Tigers FC (Cayman Islands) =

Association football club in Cayman Islands

- Full name: Tigers Football Club
- Founded: 2003
- Ground: George Town, Cayman Islands
- Chairman: TBC
- Manager: Gonzalo McLaughlin
- League: Cayman Islands League
- 2025–2026: 8th
Home colours	Away colours

Tigers FC is a Cayman Islander football club which currently plays in Cayman Islands' Premier League.

== Honours ==
CIFA Fosters First Division: (1)

- Winnres: 2023–24

== See also ==
- [ Official Site]
- caymanislandsfa.com site
- Globalsportsarchive
