= West Bay, Cayman Islands =

West Bay
- Town
- Location in the Cayman Islands
- Coordinates: 19°22′56″N 81°23′21″W
- Country: United Kingdom
- Overseas Territory: Cayman Islands
- Island: Grand Cayman
- Elevation: 6.6 ft (2 m)

Population (2021)
  - Total: 15,335
- Time zone: UTC-05:00 (EST)

West Bay is a district located on the west side of the British Overseas Territory of the Cayman Islands in the Caribbean. The population is 15,335.

West Bay is a residential area located north of Grand Cayman's tourist-popular Seven Mile Beach. It is also a tourist area with destinations such as Hell, Cayman Turtle Farm, Cayman Motor Museum, and Dolphin Adventure. It is home to the Scholars International football club. West Bay features a public beach, complete with changing rooms and bathrooms available to the public. The beach is popular because of its proximity to the restaurants in Grand Cayman. This is the location that many watched the sinking of the USS Kittiwake in 2011.

== Politics ==
West Bay is one of the two largest electoral districts on Grand Cayman, along with George Town. The politics of West Bay are dominated by former members of the conservative Cayman Democratic Party.

The Cayman Islands Former Premier, McKeeva Bush, was elected from the West Bay district.

== Education ==
The Cayman Islands Education Department operates John A. Cumber Primary School, located in West Bay.
