= Elite SC =

Association football club in Cayman Islands

- Full name: Elite Sport Club
- Founded: January 2006
- Ground: West Bay, Cayman Islands
- Chairperson: Martha Godet
- League: Cayman Islands Premier League
- 2025–2026: Champions
Home colours	Away colours

Elite Sports Club is a Cayman Islands professional football club based in West Bay, which currently plays in the Cayman Islands Premier League.

== Results ==
=== International ===
Results list Elite SC's goal tally first.

Win Draw Loss Fixture

Competition	Round	Club	Score
2012 CFU Club Championship	First Round	(Bermuda) North Village Rams	2–1
2012 CFU Club Championship	First Round	(Cayman Islands) George Town SC	1–2
2017 Caribbean Club Championship	First Round	(Dominican Republic) Barcelona Atlético	0–4
2017 Caribbean Club Championship	First Round	(Jamaica) Montego Bay United	0–5
2017 Caribbean Club Championship	First Round	(Antigua and Barbuda) Grenades	0–2
2026 CFU Club Shield	First Round	(British Virgin Islands) Virgin Gorda United	2–0
2026 CFU Club Shield	Round of 16	(Dominican Republic) Delfines del Este	0–2

== Achievements ==
- Cayman Islands League

2008–09, 2010–11 2024–25

- Cayman Islands FA Cup

2013–14, 2015-16, 2018–19

- CIFA Charity Shield

2009

== Historic goalscorer ==
Christopher Reeves
	League	Cup	Total
Goals	92	4	96
Topscorer	5		5
Hat-tricks	11		11
Years	2017-		
