= Academy SC =

Association football club in Cayman Islands

Academy Sports Club
- Founded: 1995
- Ground: Academy Sports Field, Outpost Road
- Capacity: 500
- Chairman: Capt. Dave Scott
- Manager: Paul Byles
- League: Cayman Islands Premier League
- 2025-2026: CIFA Men’s Premier League, 2nd
- Website: https://academysportsclub.ky/
| Home colours | Away colours |

Academy SC is a Cayman Islands amateur football club based in George Town which currently plays in Cayman Islands Premier League.

== Honours ==
- CIFA Fosters First Division: (1)
  - 2014–15
- Cayman Islands FA Cup: (2)
  - 2022–23, 2023–24
- Cayman Islands Vice-president Cup: (1)
  - 2022

== Squad (2022) ==
Note: Flags indicate national team as defined under FIFA eligibility rules; some limited exceptions apply. Players may hold more than one non-FIFA nationality.

| No. | Pos. | Nation | Player |
|---|---|---|---|
| — | GK | CAY | Deshawn Whittaker |
| — | DF | CAY | Rohelio Wright |
| — | DF | CAY | Nathan Borde |
| — | MF | CAY | Jayden Wright |
| — | MF | CAY | Kory McLean (Vice-Captain) |
| — | FW | JAM | Vinroy Grant |
| — | FW | CAY | Rohann Williams |
| — | DF | CAY | Angelo Forbes |
| — | DF | CAY | Aidan Bartice |
| — | FW | CAY | Shaquille Williams |
| — | MF | CAY | Eric Green |
| — | DF | CAY | Shamar Gooden |
| — | FW | CAY | Adebayo Oremule |
| — | FW | CAY | Andrew Antonysraj |
| — | MF | CAY | Bryan Ramoon |
| — | FW | CAY | Yohan Lindo |
| — | MF | CAY | Miles Baillas-Thompson |
| — | MF | POR | Nuno Mourinho |
| — | FW | CAY | Mikael Crooks |
| — | FW | CAY | Javon Henry |
| — | DF | CAY | Darius Williams |
| — | DF | CAY | Travis McLean (Captain) |
