= Roma United SC =

Association football club in Cayman Islands

Roma United
- Full name: Roma United Sports Club
- Founded: 2002
- Ground: Various
- League: Cayman Islands Division One
- 2024–2025: ▼11th in Cayman Islands Premier League
Home colours	Away colours

Roma United Sports Club is a professional football club based in George Town, Cayman Islands, which currently plays in the Cayman Islands Premier League. It was formed in 2002 after a merger between Roma International and Soweto.

== Achievements ==
- Cayman Islands Digicel Cup:

2007–08

- President Cup: 2015–16
