= George Town SC =

Association football club in Cayman Islands

- Founded: 1996
- Ground: T.E. McField Sports Centre, George Town, Cayman Islands
- Capacity: 2,500
- League: Cayman Islands Premier League

George Town SC is a professional football club based in George Town, Cayman Islands, which currently plays in the Cayman Islands Premier League. Its home stadium is the 2,500-capacity T.E. McField Sports Centre.

== Achievements ==
- Cayman Islands League:

1996–97, 1998–99, 2001–02

- Cayman Islands FA Cup:

1997–98, 2001–02, 2009–10, 2010–11

- Cayman Islands Digicel Cup:

2009–10, 2010–11

== Performance in CONCACAF competitions ==
Competition	Round	Country	Club	Home	Away	Aggregate
2002 CFU Club Championship	Preliminary	JAM	Harbour View	0–3	1–7	1–10
