= Bodden Town FC =

Association football club in Cayman Islands

- Full name: Bodden Town Football Club
- Founded: 1970
- Ground: Haig Bodden Stadium; Cayman Islands
- Capacity: 1,500
- League: Cayman Islands League
- 2025–2026: 4th
Home colours	Away colours

Bodden Town Football Club is a Cayman Island professional football club, which currently plays in the Cayman Islands Premier League.

== History ==
Bodden Town won the 2013–14 Cayman Islands Premier League which also sees them invited by Oceania Football Confederation to participate in the 2014 OFC President's Cup.

== Honours ==
- Cayman Islands League: 4

2012–13, 2013–14, 2016–17, 2019–20

- Cayman Islands FA Cup: 5

2000–01, 2008–09, 2012–13, 2016–17, 2020–21

== Former players ==
- (Cayman Islands) Wesley Robinson
