= Aruba national football team results =

The Aruba national football team represents Aruba in international association football, under the auspices of the Aruba Football Federation. Aruba played its first international match in 1930, challenging neighboring Curaçao. The Arubaanse Voetbal Bond was founded the same year, and officially organized in 1932. Although the AVB had existed since 1932, Aruba was previously officially represented in football as part of the Netherlands Antilles national team until 1986. That year, Aruba gained status aparte from the Netherlands Antilles and became a separate country within the Kingdom of the Netherlands. The same year, Aruba became a member of CONCACAF. Two years later, the country was accepted as a FIFA member nation. Aruba's first match after joining the world governing body was a loss to Trinidad and Tobago in friendly tournament on 31 March 1989. Despite finishing last in its group, Aruba gained its first point in an international match with a scoreless draw with Grenada in 1989 Caribbean Cup qualification on 21 May 1989.

Historically, most of Aruba's matches have been played against other members of CONCACAF, with several exceptions. In 2010, the nation played neighboring Venezuela, a member of CONMEBOL. The South American nation won 3–0. Aruba hosted Guam for two friendlies in March 2014. The two matches were Aruba's first-ever contests against a member of the Asian Football Confederation (AFC). The first match ended in a 2–2 draw. Aruba won the second match 2–0. In March 2025, Aruba played a friendly away at Cambodia, another AFC member. Aruba won the match 2–1. In 2026, Aruba was announced as a participant in the 2026 FIFA Series, a new competition meant to promote member nations playing members of other confederations. Aruba was drawn into a group with Liechtenstein (UEFA), Macau (AFC), and Tanzania (CAF) with matches played in Rwanda. Aruba won both matches, defeating Macau and Liechtenstein, by a score of 4–1 en route to becoming champions of its section, the most prestigious award in team history.

Below is a list of Aruba's results in international football since joining CONCACAF in 1986.

== International matches ==
Key
Colour	Meaning
	Defeat
	Draw
	Win

Aruba national football team results
No.	Date	Venue	H/A	Opponents	Score	Competition	Aruba scorers and time of goal	Report
1	31 March 1989	Netherlands Antilles	A	Trinidad and Tobago	0–7	Friendly Tournament		Report
2	2 April 1989	Netherlands Antilles	A	Netherlands Antilles	0–1	Friendly Tournament		Report
3	23 April 1989	Arima, Trinidad and Tobago	A	Trinidad and Tobago	0–11	1989 Caribbean Cup qualification		Report
4	21 May 1989	Oranjestad, Aruba	H	Grenada	0–0	1989 Caribbean Cup qualification		Report
5	8 June 1989	French Guiana	A	French Guiana	0–4	1989 Caribbean Cup qualification		Report
6	18 June 1989	Oranjestad, Aruba	H	Saint Kitts and Nevis	1–4	1989 Caribbean Cup qualification	Unknown	Report
7	26 March 1990	Ronald Webster Park,The Valley, Anguilla	A	Cayman Islands	1–2	1990 Caribbean Cup qualification	Unknown	Report
8	29 March 1990	Stade Alberic Richards,Sandy Ground, Saint Martin	A	Sint Maarten	2–2	1990 Caribbean Cup qualification	Unknown	Report
9	30 September 1990	Trinidad Stadium, Oranjestad, Aruba	H	Netherlands Antilles	1–3	Friendly	Unknown	Report
10	8 May 1991	Georgetown, Guyana	A	Suriname	0–1	1991 Caribbean Cup qualification		Report
11	10 May 1991	Georgetown, Guyana	A	Guyana	1–4	1991 Caribbean Cup qualification	Unknown	Report
12	8 April 1992	André Kamperveen Stadion, Paramaribo, Suriname	A	Suriname	0–5	1992 Caribbean Cup qualification		Report
13	10 April 1992	André Kamperveen Stadion, Paramaribo, Suriname	A	French Guiana	0–2	1992 Caribbean Cup qualification		Report
14	12 April 1992	André Kamperveen Stadion, Paramaribo, Suriname	A	Guyana	0–3	1992 Caribbean Cup qualification		Report
15	7 May 1995	Trinidad Stadium, Oranjestad, Aruba	H	Netherlands Antilles	3–4	1995 Caribbean Cup qualification	J. Lake, Jacobs	Report
16	14 May 1995	Bramendiweg Sportpark, Willemstad, Netherlands Antilles	A	Netherlands Antilles	2–3	1995 Caribbean Cup qualification	J. Lake,	Report
17	24 March 1996	Félix Sánchez Olympic Stadium, Santo Domingo, Dominican Republic	A	Dominican Republic	2–3	1998 FIFA World Cup qualification	Davelaar 60'; Malmberg 84'	Report
18	31 March 1996	Trinidad Stadium, Oranjestad, Aruba	H	Dominican Republic	1–3	1998 FIFA World Cup qualification	Davelaar 38' (pen.)	Report
19	2 March 1997	Trinidad Stadium, Oranjestad, Aruba	H	Netherlands Antilles	2–1	1997 Caribbean Cup qualification	Unknown	Report
20	4 March 1997	Trinidad Stadium, Oranjestad, Aruba	H	Jamaica	0–6	1997 Caribbean Cup qualification		Report
21	3 March 1998	Trinidad Stadium, Oranjestad, Aruba	H	French Guiana	1–0	1998 Caribbean Cup qualification	J. Lake	Report
22	5 March 1998	Trinidad Stadium, Oranjestad, Aruba	H	Netherlands Antilles	0–1	1998 Caribbean Cup qualification		Report
23	7 March 1998	Trinidad Stadium, Oranjestad, Aruba	H	Suriname	3–3	1998 Caribbean Cup qualification	Unknown	Report
24	11 March 2000	Trinidad Stadium, Oranjestad, Aruba	H	Puerto Rico	4–2	2002 FIFA World Cup qualification	Gross 47'; Filomina 54', 70'; Mackay 85'	Report
25	19 March 2000	Estadio Sixto Escobar, San Juan, Puerto Rico	A	Puerto Rico	2–2	2002 FIFA World Cup qualification	Mackay 37'; Kross 43'	Report
26	1 April 2000	Trinidad Stadium, Oranjestad, Aruba	H	Barbados	1–3	2002 FIFA World Cup qualification	Gross 89'	Report
27	16 April 2000	Barbados National Stadium, Bridgetown, Barbados	A	Barbados	0–4	2002 FIFA World Cup qualification		Report
28	4 April 2001	André Kamperveen Stadion, Paramaribo, Suriname	A	Suriname	0–5	2001 Caribbean Cup qualification		Report
29	6 April 2001	André Kamperveen Stadion, Paramaribo, Suriname	A	Grenada	2–4	2001 Caribbean Cup qualification	Agungbero 25'; G. Lake 66'	Report
30	8 April 2001	André Kamperveen Stadion, Paramaribo, Suriname	A	Barbados	2–5	2001 Caribbean Cup qualification	Filomena 6'; Santana 73'	Report
31	28 July 2002	Trinidad Stadium, Oranjestad, Aruba	H	Suriname	0–2	2003 CONCACAF Gold Cup qualification		Report
32	28 July 2002	André Kamperveen Stadion, Paramaribo, Suriname	A	Suriname	0–6	2003 CONCACAF Gold Cup qualification		Report
33	28 January 2004	Willemstad, Curaçao	A	Netherlands Antilles	1–6	Friendly	Unknown	Report
34	28 February 2004	Trinidad Stadium, Oranjestad, Aruba	H	Suriname	1–2	2006 FIFA World Cup qualification	Escalona 89'	Report
35	27 March 2004	André Kamperveen Stadion, Paramaribo, Suriname	A	Suriname	1–8	2006 FIFA World Cup qualification	Escalona 24'	Report
36	6 February 2008	Trinidad Stadium, Oranjestad, Aruba	H	Antigua and Barbuda	0–3	2010 FIFA World Cup qualification		Report
37	26 March 2008	Antigua Recreation Ground, St. John's, Antigua and Barbuda	A	Antigua and Barbuda	0–1	2010 FIFA World Cup qualification		Report
38	27 July 2008	Ergilio Hato Stadium, Willemstad, Curaçao	A	Netherlands Antilles	0–0	2008 Caribbean Cup qualification		Report
39	29 July 2008	Ergilio Hato Stadium, Willemstad, Curaçao	A	Grenada	1–3	2008 Caribbean Cup qualification	Ruiz 50'	Report
40	20 May 2010	Trinidad Stadium, Oranjestad, Aruba	H	Venezuela	0–3	Friendly		Report
41	29 October 2010	Ergilio Hato Stadium, Willemstad, Curaçao	A	Curaçao	0–3	2010 ABCS Tournament		Report
42	31 October 2010	Ergilio Hato Stadium, Willemstad, Curaçao	A	Bonaire	3–3	2010 ABCS Tournament	Santos; Escalona,	Report
43	8 July 2011	Trinidad Stadium, Oranjestad, Aruba	H	Saint Lucia	4–2	2014 FIFA World Cup qualification	Santos de Gouveia 13'; Escalona 48'; Gomez 76'; Abdul 85'	Report
44	12 July 2011	Mindoo Philip Park, Castries, Saint Lucia	A	Saint Lucia	2–4	2014 FIFA World Cup qualification	Gomez 44'; Barradas 76'	Report
45	2 December 2011	Dr. Ir. Franklin Essed Stadion, Paramaribo, Suriname	A	Suriname	0–0 (5–4 Pens.)	2011 ABCS Tournament		Report
46	2 December 2011	Dr. Ir. Franklin Essed Stadion, Paramaribo, Suriname	A	Bonaire	2–2 (3–4 Pens.)	2011 ABCS Tournament	Bergen 50'; Gomez 53'	Report
47	13 July 2012	Trinidad Stadium, Oranjestad, Aruba	H	Curaçao	3–2	2012 ABCS Tournament	Gilkes 2'; Raven 44'; Barradas 76'	Report
48	15 July 2012	Trinidad Stadium, Oranjestad, Aruba	H	Suriname	1–0	2012 ABCS Tournament	Gilkes 35'	Report
49	23 September 2012	Kensington Oval, Bridgetown, Barbados	A	Dominican Republic	2–2	2012 Caribbean Cup qualification	Baten 6'; Barradas 30'	Report
50	25 September 2012	Kensington Oval, Bridgetown, Barbados	A	Dominica	2–3	2012 Caribbean Cup qualification	Bergen 40'; Gomez 55'	Report
51	27 September 2012	Kensington Oval, Bridgetown, Barbados	A	Barbados	1–2	2012 Caribbean Cup qualification	Bergen 32'	Report
52	14 November 2013	Ergilio Hato Stadium, Willemstad, Curaçao	A	Curaçao	0–2	2013 ABCS Tournament		Report
53	16 November 2013	Ergilio Hato Stadium, Willemstad, Curaçao	A	Bonaire	1–2	2013 ABCS Tournament	Escalona 43'	Report
54	27 March 2014	Trinidad Stadium, Oranjestad, Aruba	H	Guam	2–2	Friendly	Baten 3'; Kock 90+2'	Report
55	30 March 2014	Trinidad Stadium, Oranjestad, Aruba	H	Guam	2–0	Friendly	Dumfries 23'; Kock 75'	Report
56	30 May 2014	Trinidad Stadium, Oranjestad, Aruba	H	Turks and Caicos Islands	1–0	2014 Caribbean Cup qualification	Linkers 28'	Report
57	1 June 2014	Trinidad Stadium, Oranjestad, Aruba	H	British Virgin Islands	7–0	2014 Caribbean Cup qualification	Barradas 2'; Kock 20'; Raven 22', 52', 61'; Cruden 85'; Santos 90+2'	Report
58	3 June 2014	Trinidad Stadium, Oranjestad, Aruba	H	French Guiana	0–2	2014 Caribbean Cup qualification		Report
59	30 January 2015	Dr. Ir. Franklin Essed Stadion, Paramaribo, Suriname	A	Curaçao	0–0 (5–3 Pens.)	2015 ABCS Tournament		Report
60	1 February 2015	Dr. Ir. Franklin Essed Stadion, Paramaribo, Suriname	A	Suriname	0–1	2015 ABCS Tournament		Report
61	10 June 2015	Trinidad Stadium, Oranjestad, Aruba	H	Barbados	0–2	2018 FIFA World Cup qualification		Report
62	14 June 2015	Usain Bolt Sports Complex, Cave Hill, Barbados	A	Barbados	3–0; Awarded	2018 FIFA World Cup qualification		Report
63	4 September 2015	Arnos Vale Stadium, Kingstown, Saint Vincent and the Grenadines	A	Saint Vincent and the Grenadines	0–2	2018 FIFA World Cup qualification		Report
64	8 September 2015	Trinidad Stadium, Oranjestad, Aruba	H	Saint Vincent and the Grenadines	2–1	2018 FIFA World Cup qualification	Danso 4', 50'	Report
65	23 March 2016	Sir Vivian Richards Stadium, North Sound, Antigua and Barbuda	A	Antigua and Barbuda	1–2	2017 Caribbean Cup qualification	Gómez 28'	Report
66	26 March 2016	Trinidad Stadium, Oranjestad, Aruba	H	Saint Kitts and Nevis	0–2	2017 Caribbean Cup qualification		Report
67	9 September 2018	Ergilio Hato Stadium, Willemstad, Curaçao	A	Bermuda	3–1	2019–20 CONCACAF Nations League qualifying	Gómez 7'; Baten 11' (pen.) de Gouveia 50'	Report
68	16 October 2018	Stade René Serge Nabajoth, Les Abymes, Guadeloupe	A	Guadeloupe	0–0	2019–20 CONCACAF Nations League qualifying		Report
69	16 November 2018	Ergilio Hato Stadium, Willemstad, Curaçao	A	Montserrat	0–2	2019–20 CONCACAF Nations League qualifying		
70	22 March 2019	Sir Vivian Richards Stadium, North Sound, Antigua and Barbuda	A	Saint Lucia	2–3	2019–20 CONCACAF Nations League qualifying	John 53'; Gross 90+2'	Report
71	6 September 2019	Ergilio Hato Stadium, Willemstad, Curaçao	A	Guyana	0–1	2019–20 CONCACAF Nations League B		Report
72	9 September 2019	Sir Vivian Richards Stadium, North Sound, Antigua and Barbuda	A	Antigua and Barbuda	1–2	2019–20 CONCACAF Nations League B	Groothusen 45+5'	Report
73	12 October 2019	Independence Park, Kingston, Jamaica	A	Jamaica	0–2	2019–20 CONCACAF Nations League B		Report
74	15 October 2019	Ergilio Hato Stadium, Willemstad, Curaçao	A	Jamaica	0–6	2019–20 CONCACAF Nations League B		Report
75	15 November 2019	Synthetic Track and Field Facility, Leonora, Guyana	A	Guyana	2–6	2019–20 CONCACAF Nations League B	Croes 2'; Breinburg 22' (pen.)	Report
76	18 November 2019	Ergilio Hato Stadium, Willemstad, Curaçao	A	Antigua and Barbuda	2–3	2019–20 CONCACAF Nations League B	John 20'; Harms 76'	Report
77	27 March 2021	IMG Academy, Bradenton, Florida, United States	A	Suriname	0–6	2022 FIFA World Cup qualification		Report
78	30 March 2021	IMG Academy, Bradenton, Florida, United States	A	Bermuda	0–5	2022 FIFA World Cup qualification		Report
79	2 June 2021	IMG Academy, Bradenton, Florida, United States	A	Cayman Islands	3–1	2022 FIFA World Cup qualification	John 40', 75'; Groothusen 45+2'	Report
80	5 June 2021	IMG Academy, Bradenton, Florida, United States	A	Canada	0–7	2022 FIFA World Cup qualification		Report
81	1 October 2021	Stadion Rignaal 'Jean' Francisca, Willemstad, Curaçao	A	Curaçao	1–7	2021 ABCS Tournament	Hodge (90+?)	Report
82	3 June 2022	Raymond E. Guishard Technical Centre, The Valley, Anguilla	A	Saint Martin	0–0	2022–23 CONCACAF Nations League C		Report
83	6 June 2022	Stadion Rignaal 'Jean' Francisca, Willemstad, Curaçao	A	Saint Martin	3–0	2022–23 CONCACAF Nations League C	Groothusen 25', 35'; Maria 45+2'	Report
84	9 June 2022	Stadion Rignaal 'Jean' Francisca, Willemstad, Curaçao	A	Saint Kitts and Nevis	2–3	2022–23 CONCACAF Nations League C	Breinburg 55' (pen.); Jiménez 90+5'	Report
85	24 November 2022	Stadion Rignaal 'Jean' Francisca, Willemstad, Curaçao	A	Curaçao	2–2 (3–5 Pens.)	2022 ABCS Tournament	Charles 82'; Van der Wijne 90'	Report
86	26 November 2022	Stadion Rignaal 'Jean' Francisca, Willemstad, Curaçao	A	Bonaire	1–0	2022 ABCS Tournament	Gross 17'	Report
87	27 March 2023	Warner Park, Basseterre, Saint Kitts and Nevis	A	Saint Kitts and Nevis	0–2	2022–23 CONCACAF Nations League C		Report
88	11 September 2023	Truman Bodden Sports Complex, George Town, Cayman Islands	A	Cayman Islands	2–1	2023–24 CONCACAF Nations League C	Ostiana 2'; Bäly 79'	Report
89	14 October 2023	Trinidad Stadium, Oranjestad, Aruba	H	U.S. Virgin Islands	3–1	2023–24 CONCACAF Nations League C	Ostiana 52'; Luydens 61'; Molina 86'	Report
90	16 November 2023	Bethlehem Soccer Stadium, Upper Bethlehem, US Virgin Islands	A	U.S. Virgin Islands	4–1	2023–24 CONCACAF Nations League C	Dania 23'; Ostiana 41', 52'; Maria 79' (pen.)	Report
91	20 November 2023	Trinidad Stadium, Oranjestad, Aruba	H	Cayman Islands	5–1	2023–24 CONCACAF Nations League C	Groothusen 16', 89'; Ostiana 45+5'; Maria 55'; Dania 77'	Report
92	23 March 2024	Estadio Cibao, Santiago, Dominican Republic	A	Dominican Republic	0–2	Friendly		Report
93	8 June 2024	Trinidad Stadium, Oranjestad, Aruba	H	Curaçao	0–2	2026 FIFA World Cup qualification		Report
94	11 June 2024	Wildey Turf, Wildey, Barbados	A	Saint Lucia	2–2	2026 FIFA World Cup qualification	Bennett 22'; Marselia 43' (pen.)	Report
95	6 September 2024	Mayagüez Athletics Stadium, Mayagüez, Puerto Rico	A	Sint Maarten	0–2	2024–25 CONCACAF Nations League B		Report
96	9 September 2024	Mayagüez Athletics Stadium, Mayagüez, Puerto Rico	A	Puerto Rico	0–1	2024–25 CONCACAF Nations League B		Report
97	11 October 2024	Trinidad Stadium, Oranjestad, Aruba	H	Haiti	1–3	2024–25 CONCACAF Nations League B	Perret Gentil 6'	Report
98	14 October 2024	Trinidad Stadium, Oranjestad, Aruba	H	Haiti	3–5	2024–25 CONCACAF Nations League B	Ostiana 14' (pen.), 20'; Kruydenhof 78'	Report
99	15 November 2024	Mayagüez Athletics Stadium, Mayagüez, Puerto Rico	A	Puerto Rico	1–5	2024–25 CONCACAF Nations League B	Jiménez 22'	Report
100	18 November 2024	Mayagüez Athletics Stadium, Mayagüez, Puerto Rico	A	Sint Maarten	0–1	2024–25 CONCACAF Nations League B		Report
101	25 March 2025	Visakha Stadium, Phnom Penh, Cambodia	A	Cambodia	2–1	Friendly	Bennett 3'; Ostiana 11'	Report
102	4 June 2025	Wildey Turf, Wildey, Barbados	A	Barbados	1–1	2026 FIFA World Cup qualification	Luydens 15'	Report
103	7 June 2025	Trinidad Stadium, Oranjestad, Aruba	H	Haiti	0–5	2026 FIFA World Cup qualification		Report
104	12 November 2025	Sir Vivian Richards Stadium, North Sound, Antigua and Barbuda	A	Antigua and Barbuda	0–0	2025–26 CONCACAF Series		Report
105	15 November 2025	Sir Vivian Richards Stadium, North Sound, Antigua and Barbuda	A	Barbados	3–0	2025–26 CONCACAF Series	Poulina 4'; Romano 59'; Fermina 76'	Report
106	26 March 2026	Kigali Pelé Stadium, Kigali, Rwanda	N	Macau	4–1	2026 FIFA Series	Fermina 5'; Romano 13', 16' van Kilsdonk 66'	Report
107	29 March 2026	Kigali Pelé Stadium, Kigali, Rwanda	N	Liechtenstein	4–1	2026 FIFA Series	Romano 18'; Robertha 25'; Breinburg 69'; Hofer 90+4' (o.g.)	Report
108	6 June 2026	Ergilio Hato Stadium, Willemstad, Curaçao	A	Curaçao	0–4	Friendly		Report

Notes

1. A: Scores list Aruba's goal tally first.
2. B: FIFA awarded Aruba a 3–0 win as a result of Barbados fielding the ineligible player Hadan Holligan. Holligan failed to serve an automatic one match suspension for receiving two yellow cards earlier in the competition.

== All-time record ==
As of match played 4 October 2026

Team	Pld	W	D	L	GF	GA	GD	WPCT
Anguilla	2	2	0	0	5	2	+3	100.00
Antigua and Barbuda	7	1	1	5	5	12	−7	14.29
Barbados	8	2	1	5	11	18	−7	25.00
Bermuda	2	1	0	1	3	6	−3	50.00
Bonaire	4	1	1	2	7	7	0	25.00
British Virgin Islands	1	1	0	0	7	0	+7	100.00
Cambodia	1	1	0	0	2	1	+1	100.00
Canada	1	0	0	1	0	7	−7	0.00
Cayman Islands	4	3	0	1	11	5	+6	75.00
Curaçao	8	2	0	6	6	22	−16	25.00
Dominica	1	0	0	1	2	3	−1	0.00
Dominican Republic	4	0	1	3	5	10	−5	0.00
French Guiana	4	1	0	3	1	8	−7	25.00
Grenada	3	0	1	2	3	7	−4	0.00
Guadeloupe	1	0	1	0	0	0	0	0.00
Guam	2	1	1	0	4	2	+2	50.00
Guyana	4	0	0	4	3	14	−11	0.00
Haiti	3	0	0	3	4	13	−9	0.00
Jamaica	3	0	0	3	0	14	−14	0.00
Liechtenstein	1	1	0	0	4	1	+3	100.00
Macau	1	1	0	0	4	1	+3	100.00
Montserrat	1	0	0	1	0	2	−2	0.00
Netherlands Antilles	8	1	1	6	9	19	−10	12.50
Puerto Rico	4	1	1	2	7	10	−3	25.00
Saint Kitts and Nevis	4	0	0	4	3	11	−8	0.00
Saint Lucia	4	1	1	2	10	11	−1	25.00
Saint Martin	2	1	1	0	3	0	+3	50.00
Saint Vincent and the Grenadines	2	1	0	1	2	3	−1	50.00
Sint Maarten	3	0	1	2	2	5	−3	0.00
Sint Maarten	12	2	1	9	6	39	−33	16.67
Trinidad and Tobago	2	0	0	2	0	18	−18	0.00
Turks and Caicos Islands	1	1	0	0	1	0	+1	100.00
U.S. Virgin Islands	2	2	0	0	7	2	+5	100.00
Venezuela	1	0	0	1	0	3	−3	0.00
Total	111	28	13	70	137	276	−139	25.23

Source: Results
