= Matthew Lentink =

Aruban footballer (born 1993)

Personal information
- Full name: Matthew Robert Lentink
- Date of birth: 18 August 1993 (age 33)
- Place of birth: Oranjestad, Aruba
- Height: 1.85 m (6 ft 1 in)
- Position: Goalkeeper

Team information
- Current team: Kloetinge
- Number: 31

Youth career
- River Plate Aruba
- –2004: Kloetinge
- 2004–2010: RBC Roosendaal

Senior career*
Years	Team	Apps	(Gls)
2010–2011	RBC Roosendaal	0	(0)
2011–2014	Goes		
2014–2018	Kloetinge		
2018–2019	Zeelandia		
2019–2020	Vlissingen		
2020–2026	Goes	89	(0)
2026–	Kloetinge	0	(0)

International career^{‡}
2014–	Aruba	28	(0)
- * Club domestic league appearances and goals as of 08:46, 25 October 2026 (UTC) ‡ National team caps and goals as of 30 September 2026

Matthew Robert Lentink (born 18 August 1993) is an Aruban footballer who plays as a goalkeeper for Tweede Divisie club Kloetinge, and the Aruba national football team.

Born in Oranjestad, Aruba, Lentink moved to the Netherlands at the age of six. He has spent his club career in amateur football in Zeeland, most of it with Goes and Kloetinge. He made his debut for Aruba in 2014. In March 2026, he kept goal as Aruba won their 2026 FIFA Series tournament in Kigali.

== Early life ==
Lentink was born in Oranjestad, Aruba, and moved to the Netherlands at the age of six. He played youth football for RBC Roosendaal.

== Club career ==
After RBC Roosendaal went bankrupt in June 2011, Lentink joined Eerste Klasse club Goes. He spent three seasons there and had a trial with NAC Breda. On 10 May 2014, he signed for Kloetinge. He stayed for four seasons before joining Zeelandia Middelburg in 2018. After a season there and another at VC Vlissingen, he returned to Goes in 2020.

In October 2020, Goes lost a KNVB Cup tie against ODIN '59 after a penalty shoot-out of 34 kicks. It was the longest shoot-out in a competitive match in Zeeland, beating the 30 kicks taken by DOSKO and VV Terneuzen in 2000. Lentink stayed at Goes for six seasons.

In the summer of 2026, Lentink rejoined Kloetinge, who had just been promoted to the Tweede Divisie, the highest amateur level. He began the season as back-up to Teun van Remortel.

== International career ==
At 16, Lentink played at the WK Amsterdam, a tournament for players with roots abroad, in an Aruba side that included national team players Raymond Baten and Ronald Gómez. He received a call from the national team a few years later. He made his debut on 28 March 2014 in a friendly against Guam.

In June 2025, Lentink started both of Aruba's World Cup qualifiers, a 1–1 draw away to Barbados and a 5–0 defeat to Haiti. In March 2026, Aruba took part in the FIFA Series in Kigali. They beat Macau 4–1 in the semi-final, where Lentink made a diving save to deny a header in the 29th minute. He then started the final, which Aruba won 4–1 against Liechtenstein. By October 2026, he had won 30 caps.

== Career statistics ==
=== International ===
As of match played 30 September 2026

Appearances and goals by national team and year
National team	Year	Apps	Goals
Aruba	2014	3	0
Aruba	2015	1	0
Aruba	2016	–	
Aruba	2017	–	
Aruba	2018	–	
Aruba	2019	2	0
Aruba	2020	–	
Aruba	2021	–	
Aruba	2022	–	
Aruba	2023	4	0
Aruba	2024	9	0
Aruba	2025	4	0
Aruba	2026	5	0
Total		28	0

== Honours ==
Aruba

- FIFA Series: 2026 (Rwanda B)
