= Annuar Kock =

Aruban footballer

Personal information
- Date of birth: 3 December 1991 (age 34)
- Place of birth: Santa Cruz, Aruba
- Height: 1.83 m (6 ft 0 in)
- Position: Right midfielder

Team information
- Current team: Estrella
- Number: 11

Senior career*
Years	Team	Apps	(Gls)
2008–2018	Estrella	62+	(0+)

International career^{‡}
2010	Aruba U20	2	(2)
2011	Aruba U23	2	(1)
2011–2019	Aruba	17	(3)
- * Club domestic league appearances and goals ‡ National team caps and goals as of 7 March 2021

Annuar Kock (born 3 December 1991) is an Aruban footballer who plays as a midfielder for SV Estrella and the Aruba national football team.

== Career ==
=== International ===
Kock made his senior international debut on 12 July 2011, coming on as a 66th-minute substitute for Theric Ruiz in a 5-4 penalty defeat to Saint Lucia during World Cup qualifying. He scored his first international goal nearly three years later, in a 2-2 friendly draw with Guam.

== Career statistics ==
=== International ===
As of matches played 18 November 2019.

National team	Year	Apps	Goals
Aruba	2011	3	0
Aruba	2014	5	3
Aruba	2018	3	0
Aruba	2019	6	0
Total		17	3

==== International Goals ====
Scores and results list Aruba's goal tally first.

Goal	Date	Venue	Opponent	Score	Result	Competition
1.	27 March 2014	Trinidad Stadium, Oranjestad, Aruba	Guam	2–2	2–2	Friendly
2.	30 March 2014	Trinidad Stadium, Oranjestad, Aruba	Guam	2–0	2–0	Friendly
3.	1 June 2014	Trinidad Stadium, Oranjestad, Aruba	British Virgin Islands	2–0	7–0	2014 Caribbean Cup qualification
