= Nickenson Paul =

Aruban footballer (born 1997)

Personal information
- Full name: Nickenson Stephan Paul
- Date of birth: 25 August 1997 (age 29)
- Place of birth: Oranjestad, Aruba
- Height: 1.80 m (5 ft 11 in)
- Position: Center-back

Team information
- Current team: Dakota
- Number: 3

Senior career*
Years	Team	Apps	(Gls)
2015–2022	Dakota	161	(11)
2022	AO Poros	12	(0)
2023–	Dakota	40	(9)

International career^{‡}
2012	Aruba U17	2	(0)
2012–2015	Aruba U20	7	(0)
2014–	Aruba	40	(0)
- * Club domestic league appearances and goals ‡ National team caps and goals as of 7 June 2025

Nickenson Stephan Paul (born 25 August 1997) is an Aruban footballer who plays as a defender for Dakota and the Aruba national football team.

== Career ==
=== Club career ===
Paul started his career with Dakota in 2015, where he helped the club to win the Aruban Division di Honor twice in 2018 and 2022. In 2017, Paul traveled to Belgium to take part in an 11-day trial with RKC Waalwijk. The following year, he was nominated by the Aruba Football Federation to attend the MLS Caribbean Combine.

He transferred to AO Poros in 2022. In 2023 he played with Dakota in the Aruban Division di Honor and in the 2023 CONCACAF Caribbean Shield.

=== International career ===
Paul made his senior international debut on 30 March 2014, coming on as an 89th-minute substitute for Denzel Dumfries in a 2–0 friendly victory over Guam.

== Career statistics ==
=== International ===
As of matches played 7 June 2025.

National team	Year	Apps	Goals
Aruba	2014	1	0
Aruba	2015	1	0
Aruba	2016	2	0
Aruba	2018	3	0
Aruba	2019	7	0
Aruba	2021	4	0
Aruba	2022	3	0
Aruba	2023	4	0
Aruba	2024	4	0
Aruba	2025	6	0
Total		35	0

== Honours ==
Dakota

- Aruban Division di Honor: 2017–18, 2021–22
- Torneo Copa Betico Croes: 2018–19, 2024–25
