= Jaybrien Romano =

Aruban footballer (born 2004)

Personal information
- Full name: Jaybriën Dicheiro Nafali Romano
- Date of birth: 13 December 2004 (age 21)
- Place of birth: Netherlands
- Position: Left-back

Team information
- Current team: RKSV Halsteren

Youth career
- –2018: Twente
- 2019–2022: Sparta Rotterdam
- 2022–2023: Stoke City
- 2023: Braintree Town
- 2023–2024: Aldershot Town
- 2024–2025: Den Bosch

Senior career*
Years	Team	Apps	(Gls)
2026–	RKSV Halsteren	0	(0)

International career^{‡}
2022	Aruba U20	3	(0)
2023–	Aruba	10	(4)
- * Club domestic league appearances and goals ‡ National team caps and goals as of 17:11, 29 March 2026 (UTC)

Jaybriën Dicheiro Nafali Romano (born 13 December 2004) is a professional footballer who plays as a left back for Vierde Divisie club RKSV Halsteren. Born in the Netherlands, he represents the Aruba national team.

== Club career ==
As a youth, Romano played for the academy of FC Twente. By 2019, he had joined the under-16 side of Sparta Rotterdam. In September of that year, he scored in a 1–5 league defeat to the under-16 side of AZ Alkmaar. Romano joined the academy of Stoke City in 2022. He went on to make one appearance for the club in the Under-18 Premier League, coming on as a substitute in a 2–1 victory over Newcastle United on 1 October.

Romano had joined the academy of National League club Aldershot Town by December 2023. From 2024 to 2025, he played for the reserve side of Den Bosch. By January 2026, Romano had joined RKSV Halsteren of the Vierde Divisie.

== International career ==
Romano represented Aruba in the 2022 CONCACAF U-20 Championship. He served as captain of the side for the tournament. He made his senior international debut on 11 September 2023 in a 2023–24 CONCACAF Nations League C match against the Cayman Islands. On the next matchday, he assisted on a goal by Rovien Ostiana against the U.S. Virgin Islands. Because of Romano's play, he was referred to as "Aruba's ace" by local media. The eventual 3–1 victory kept Aruba undefeated at the top of its group.

=== International goals ===
No	Date	Venue	Opponent	Score	Result	Competition
1.	15 November 2025	Sir Vivian Richards Stadium, North Sound, Antigua and Barbuda	Barbados	2–0	3–0	2025–26 CONCACAF Series
2.	26 March 2026	Kigali Pelé Stadium, Kigali, Rwanda	Macau	2–0	4–1	2026 FIFA Series
3.	26 March 2026	Kigali Pelé Stadium, Kigali, Rwanda	Macau	3–0	4–1	2026 FIFA Series
4.	29 March 2026	Kigali Pelé Stadium, Kigali, Rwanda	Liechtenstein	1–0	4–1	2026 FIFA Series
Last updated 29 March 2026

=== International career statistics ===
As of match played 29 March 2026.

Aruba national team
2023	3	0
2025	5	1
2026	2	3
Total	10	4

== Honours ==
Aruba

- FIFA Series: 2026

Individual

- FIFA Series Player of the Tournament: 2026
