= Jayden Kruydenhof =

Aruban footballer (born 2006)

Personal information
- Full name: Jayden Anthony Kruydenhof
- Date of birth: 18 December 2006 (age 19)
- Place of birth: Koedijk, Netherlands
- Position: Midfielder

Team information
- Current team: AFC
- Number: 39

Youth career
- –2024: AFC '34
- 2024–2026: Cambuur

Senior career*
Years	Team	Apps	(Gls)
2026–	AFC	2	(0)

International career^{‡}
2024	Aruba U20	4	(0)
2024–	Aruba	11	(1)
- * Club domestic league appearances and goals as of 15:07, 24 October 2026 (UTC) ‡ National team caps and goals as of 24 September 2026

Jayden Kruydenhof (born 18 December 2006) is an Aruban footballer who plays as a winger for Tweede Divisie club AFC, and the Aruba national team.

== Club career ==
From a young age, Kruydenhof played for SV Koedijk. In 2016, he was invited to an internship training with Almere City. He eventually joined the academy of AFC '34 where he remained until summer 2024 when he was signed by SC Cambuur. By the start of the season, Kruydenhof was a part of Cambuur's under-19 squad. In September 2024, he scored two goals in a 5–2 victory over NAC Breda U19 to help the club secure its first points of the season.

== International career ==
Kruydenhof was part of the Aruba under-20 national team that took part in 2024 CONCACAF U-20 Championship qualifying in February 2024. He nearly scored in the nation's match against Barbados to close out qualification, but saw his shot from just inside the penalty area hit the post.

Kruydenhof made his senior debut for Aruba on 8 June 2024 in a 2026 FIFA World Cup qualification match against Curaçao. He scored his first senior international goal on 15 October 2024 in a 3–5 2024–25 CONCACAF Nations League B loss to Haiti.

=== International goals ===
Scores and results list Aruba's goal tally first.

No	Date	Venue	Opponent	Score	Result	Competition
1.	14 October 2024	Guillermo Prospero Trinidad Stadium, Oranjestad, Aruba	Haiti	3–4	3–5	2024–25 CONCACAF Nations League B
Last updated 14 October 2024

=== International career statistics ===
As of match played 14 October 2024.

Aruba national team
2024	6	1
Total	6	1
