= Kymani Nedd =

Aruban footballer (born 2004)

Personal information
- Full name: Kymani Stephen Yunus Nedd
- Date of birth: 10 June 2004 (age 22)
- Place of birth: Rotterdam, Netherlands
- Height: 1.84 m (6 ft 1/2 in)
- Positions: Defender; midfielder

Team information
- Current team: VV Zwaluwen
- Number: 26

Youth career
- Spartaan'20
- NAC Breda
- –2024: Excelsior

Senior career*
Years	Team	Apps	(Gls)
2024–2025	Excelsior	1	(0)
2026–	VV Zwaluwen	7	(0)

International career^{‡}
2022	Aruba U20	3	(0)
2023–	Aruba	19	(0)
- * Club domestic league appearances and goals as of 26 May 2026 ‡ National team caps and goals as of 22 June 2026

Kymani Stephen Yunus Nedd (born 10 June 2004) is a footballer who plays as a defender or midfielder for Derde Divisie side VV Zwaluwen. Born in the Netherlands, he represents the Aruba national team.

== Club career ==
Nedd made his professional debut for Excelsior on the opening matchday of the 2024–25 Eerste Divisie season against TOP Oss, where they lost 3–1.

After leaving Excelsior, he joined VV Zwaluwen in 2026. On 8 April 2026, he extended his contract with VV Zwaluwen for an additional season.

== International career ==
In 2022, Nedd was called up to Aruba under-20 national team for that year's CONCACAF U-20 Championship. Since 2023, he has made 19 appearances for the Aruba national team, with his debut coming in a 2023–24 CONCACAF Nations League C match against the Cayman Islands. During a friendly match against Cambodia in March 2025, Nedd assisted Rovien Ostiana's goal in a 2–1 win.

=== International career statistics ===
As of match played 29 March 2026.

Aruba national team
2023	4	0
2024	8	0
2025	4	0
2026	3	0
Total	19	0
