= Marvic Bermúdez =

Aruban football manager

Personal information
- Full name: Marvic Bermúdez
- Date of birth: 18 July 1983
- Place of birth: Aruba

Team information
- Current team: Aruba (manager)

Managerial career
- Years: Team
- SV Britannia
- 2018–: Aruba U20
- 2020–2021: Aruba
- 2022–: Aruba

Marvic Bermúdez is an Aruban football manager, currently managing the Aruba national team.

== Managerial career ==
In November 2018, Bermúdez was appointed manager of Aruba's under-20 side, following a stint at Aruban Division di Honor club SV Britannia. In 2020, following Martin Koopman's departure, Bermúdez became manager of Aruba.
