= Marco Rasmijn =

Aruban football manager

Personal information
- Place of birth: Aruba

Managerial career
- Years: Team
- 2000: Aruba

Marco "Njaks" Rasmijn is an Aruban professional football manager.

== Career ==
In 2000, he coached the Aruba national football team.
