= Marcelo Muñoz =

Argentine football manager

Personal information
- Place of birth: Argentina

Managerial career
- Years: Team
- 2004: Aruba
- 2008: Aruba

Marcelo Muñoz is an Argentine professional football manager.

== Career ==
Since January until June 2004 and January until February 2008 he coached the Aruba national football team.

9 July 2012 he died after battling cancer.
