= Terence Groothusen =

Aruban footballer

Personal information
- Full name: Terence Clyde Leon Groothusen
- Date of birth: 16 September 1996 (age 30)
- Place of birth: Amsterdam, Netherlands
- Height: 1.92 m (6 ft 4 in)
- Position: Forward

Team information
- Current team: Olympia Haarlem

Youth career
- –2014: DWS
- 2014–2015: EDO

Senior career*
Years	Team	Apps	(Gls)
2015–2017	EDO		
2017–2019	Dordrecht	21	(0)
2019	Hibernians	12	(3)
2020	Kozakken Boys	1	(0)
2020	SV Straelen	9	(0)
2021	Alemannia Aachen	10	(0)
2021	Rot Weiss Ahlen	8	(0)
2022	Hibernians	0	(0)
2022–2023	Sliema Wanderers	5	(1)
2023	Poros	5	(0)
2023–2024	Sportlust '46	27	(2)
2024–2025	ADO '20	23	(1)
2025–	Olympia Haarlem		

International career^{‡}
2019–	Aruba	22	(4)
2022	Aruba XI	2	(2)
- * Club domestic league appearances and goals as of 4 August 2025 ‡ National team caps and goals as of 4 September 2026

Terence Clyde Leon Groothusen (born 16 September 1996) is a professional footballer who plays as a forward for Olympia Haarlem. Born in Netherlands, he plays for the Aruba national team. Besides the Netherlands, he has played in Malta and Germany.

== Club career ==
Groothusen made his Eerste Divisie debut for FC Dordrecht on 18 August 2017 in a game against Fortuna Sittard.

On 12 February 2020, Groothusen joined Kozakken Boys.

On 24 June 2020, it was announced that Groothusen had signed for SV Straelen.

In January 2021, Groothusen joined Alemannia Aachen. In summer 2022 he returned to former club Hibernians in the Maltese Premier League, only to move on to second-tier Sliema Wanderers that same year. In 2023 he returned to the Netherlands to play for amateur side Sportlust '46 after a short spell at Greek third-tier outfit Poros. A year later he tried his luck at ADO '20 alongside fellow Aruban international player Jonathan Richard.

== International career ==
Groothusen made his Aruba national football team debut on 6 September 2019 in a CONCACAF Nations League game against Guyana, as a starter.

=== International goals ===
Scores and results list Aruba's goal tally first, score column indicates score after each Groothusen goal.

List of international goals scored by Terence Groothusen
No.	Date	Venue	Opponent	Score	Result	Competition
1	9 September 2019	Sir Vivian Richards Stadium, North Sound, Antigua and Barbuda	Antigua and Barbuda	1–1	1–2	2019–20 CONCACAF Nations League B
2	2 June 2021	IMG Academy, Bradenton, United States	Cayman Islands	2–1	3–1	2022 FIFA World Cup qualification
3	6 June 2022	Stadion Rignaal 'Jean' Francisca, Willemstad, Curaçao	Saint Martin	1–0	3–0	2022–23 CONCACAF Nations League C
4	6 June 2022	Stadion Rignaal 'Jean' Francisca, Willemstad, Curaçao	Saint Martin	2–0	3–0	2022–23 CONCACAF Nations League C
5	20 November 2023	Trinidad Stadium, Oranjestad, Aruba	Cayman Islands	1–0	5–1	2023–24 CONCACAF Nations League C
6	20 November 2023	Trinidad Stadium, Oranjestad, Aruba	Cayman Islands	5–1	5–1	2023–24 CONCACAF Nations League C
