= Rensy Barradas =

Aruban footballer

Personal information
- Full name: Remsy Barradas
- Date of birth: 21 October 1990 (age 36)
- Place of birth: Aruba
- Position: Forward

International career
Years	Team	Apps	(Gls)
2011	Aruba U23	2	(0)
2011-2015	Aruba	9	(4)

Rensy Barradas (born 21 October 1990 in Willemstad) is an Aruban footballer who plays as a striker. He played at the 2014 FIFA World Cup qualifier.

== International career ==
=== International goals ===
Scores and results list Aruba's goal tally first.

No	Date	Venue	Opponent	Score	Result	Competition
1.	12 July 2011	Mindoo Phillip Park, Castries, Saint Lucia	Saint Lucia	2–4	2–4 (5–4 pen.)	2014 FIFA World Cup qualification
2.	13 July 2012	Trinidad Stadium, Oranjestad, Aruba	Curaçao	3–2	3–2	2012 ABCS Tournament
3.	23 September 2012	Kensington Oval, Bridgetown, Barbados	Dominican Republic	2–1	2–2	2012 Caribbean Cup qualification
4.	1 June 2014	Trinidad Stadium, Oranjestad, Aruba	British Virgin Islands	1–0	7–0	2014 Caribbean Cup qualification
