= Wander Gross =

Aruban footballer

Personal information
- Date of birth: December 14, 1978 (age 47)
- Position: Midfielder

International career
| Years | Team | Apps | (Gls) |
| 2000–2001 | Aruba | 5 | (4) |

Wander Gross (born December 14, 1978) is an Aruban football player. He has played for Aruba national team as a midfielder.

== Career statistics ==
=== International ===
Appearances and goals by national team and year
| National team | Year | Apps | Goals |
|---|---|---|---|
| Aruba | 2000 | 4 | 3 |
| Aruba | 2001 | 1 | 1 |
| Total | | 5 | 4 |

Scores and results list Aruba's goal tally first, score column indicates score after each Gross goal.

List of international goals scored by Wander Gross
| No. | Date | Venue | Opponent | Score | Result | Competition | Ref. |
|---|---|---|---|---|---|---|---|
| 1 | 11 March 2000 | Trinidad Stadium, Oranjestad, Aruba | Puerto Rico | 1–2 | 4–2 | 2002 FIFA World Cup qualification | |
| 2 | 19 March 2000 | Estadio Sixto Escobar, San Juan, Puerto Rico | Puerto Rico | 2–2 | 2–2 | 2002 FIFA World Cup qualification | |
| 3 | 1 April 2000 | Trinidad Stadium, Oranjestad, Aruba | Barbados | 1–3 | 1–3 | 2002 FIFA World Cup qualification | |
| 4 | 8 April 2001 | André Kamperveen Stadion, Paramaribo, Suriname | Barbados | 5–2 | 5–2 | 2001 Caribbean Cup qualification | |
