= Walter Bennett (footballer, born 1997) =

Aruban footballer (born 1997)

Personal information
- Full name: Walter Julio Bennett
- Date of birth: 18 March 1997 (age 29)
- Place of birth: Oranjestad, Aruba
- Position: Midfielder

Team information
- Current team: SC Feyenoord
- Number: 22

Senior career*
Years	Team	Apps	(Gls)
2016–2019	Excelsior Maassluis	31	(0)
2019–2021	Racing Club Aruba		
2021–	SC Feyenoord		

International career^{‡}
2015	Aruba U20	5	(0)
2018–	Aruba	26	(2)
- * Club domestic league appearances and goals as of 21:51, 11 December 2024 (UTC) ‡ National team caps and goals as of 04:25, 4 August 2025 (UTC)

Walter Julio Bennett (born 18 March 1997) is an Aruban professional footballer who plays as a midfielder for SC Feyenoord.

== Club career ==
Bennett has played club football with Excelsior Maassluis and SV Racing Club Aruba.

== International career ==
He received his first international call-up to the Aruba national team in September 2018, making his debut on 9 September 2018 in a game against Bermuda. He received a second call-up in October 2018.
