= Quinlan Poulina =

Aruban footballer (born 2004)

Personal information
- Date of birth: 20 February 2003 (age 23)
- Place of birth: Leiderdorp, Netherlands
- Height: 1.90 m (6 ft 3 in)
- Position: Midfielder

Youth career
- –2022: Alphense Boys
- 2022–2023: VV Katwijk

Senior career*
Years	Team	Apps	(Gls)
2023–2025	VV Katwijk	3	(0)
2025	→ Ter Leede (loan)		
2025–	FC Lisse	13	(1)

International career^{‡}
2025–	Aruba	2	(1)
- * Club domestic league appearances and goals ‡ National team caps and goals as of 19:38, 9 January 2026 (UTC)

Quinlan Poulina (born 20 February 2003) is a professional footballer who plays as a midfielder for Derde Divisie club FC Lisse. Born in the Netherlands, he represents the Aruba at the national level.

== Club career ==
Poulina started his career with local club RC Leiderdorp before moving on to Alphense Boys. In 2022, he joined VV Katwijk. The following year, he signed a two-year professional contract with the club and made his senior debut for the club in a Tweede Divisie match against OFC Oostzaan during the 2022–23 season. He joined Ter Leede on loan from VV Katwijk during the winter 2025 transfer window to gain more first-team playing time.

In March 2025, Poulina joined FC Lisse on a two-year contract.

== International career ==
Poulina made his senior international debut on 12 November 2025 in a 2025–26 CONCACAF Series match against Antigua and Barbuda. Two days later, he started a match against Barbados in the same competition, scoring his first senior international goal in the eventual 3–0 victory.

=== International goals ===
No	Date	Venue	Opponent	Score	Result	Competition
1.	15 November 2025	Sir Vivian Richards Stadium, North Sound, Antigua and Barbuda	Barbados	1–0	3–0	2025–26 CONCACAF Series
Last updated 9 January 2026

=== International career statistics ===
As of match played 15 November 2025.

Aruba national team
2025	2	1
Total	2	1
