= Leroy Oehlers =

Aruban footballer

Personal information
- Date of birth: 12 December 1992 (age 33)
- Position: Left back

Team information
- Current team: Hercules

Senior career*
Years	Team	Apps	(Gls)
2012–2017	SV Huizen		
2017–	Hercules	18	(0)

International career^{‡}
2013–	Aruba	19	(0)
- * Club domestic league appearances and goals as of 18:43, 28 June 2018 (UTC) ‡ National team caps and goals as of 10:33, 31 August 2021 (UTC)

Leroy Oehlers (born 12 December 1992) is an Aruban international footballer who plays for Dutch club Hercules, as a left back.

== Career ==
He has played club football for SV Huizen and Hercules.

He made his international debut for Aruba in 2013.
