= Carlito Fermina =

Aruban footballer (born 2000)

Personal information
- Date of birth: 6 January 2000 (age 26)
- Place of birth: Delft, Netherlands
- Height: 1.83 m (6 ft 0 in)
- Position: Forward

Team information
- Current team: Kozakken Boys
- Number: 99

Youth career
- -2007: Vitesse Delft
- 2007-2013: Feyenoord
- 2013–2015: ADO Den Haag
- 2015–2019: Excelsior

Senior career*
Years	Team	Apps	(Gls)
2018–2019	Excelsior	2	(0)
2019–2020	Jong Almere City	5	(0)
2020–2021	NAC U21	4	(2)
2021–2022	Anagennisi Ierapetra	0	(0)
2022–2023	Excelsior Maassluis	18	(2)
2023	ASD Alghero	0	(0)
2023–2024	Ter Leede	0	(0)
2024–	Kozakken Boys	62	(11)

International career^{‡}
2018	Curaçao U20	4	(1)
2025–	Aruba	4	(1)
Medal record
Representing Aruba
Men's football
FIFA Series
Winner	2026 Rwanda
- * Club domestic league appearances and goals as of 6 July 2026 ‡ National team caps and goals as of 6 July 2026

Carlito Fermina (born 6 January 2000) is a footballer who plays as a forward for Tweede Divisie club Kozakken Boys. Born in the Netherlands, he plays for the Aruba national team.

Fermina has represented Curaçao at the youth level, before switching to play for Aruba.

== Club career ==
Fermina made his professional debut for Excelsior in a 1–1 Eredivisie tie with Fortuna Sittard on 11 August 2018.

Ahead of the 2019–20 season, Fermina moved to Almere City FC, starting on the U21 team, Jong Almere City.

Fermina joined amateur side Ter Leede in September 2023 from Italian club Alghero 1945. He earlier had a spell abroad, when he played for Greek third-tier outfit Anagennisi Ierapetra.

== Personal life ==
Born in the Netherlands, Fermina is of Curaçaoan descent.

== Honours ==
Aruba

- FIFA Series: 2026
