= Aruba national under-20 football team =

Youth association football team

Aruba
- Association: Arubaanse Voetbal Bond
- Confederation: CONCACAF (North America)
- Sub-confederation: CFU (Caribbean)
- Head coach: Elvis Albertus
- Home stadium: Trinidad Stadium
- FIFA code: ARU
First colours	Second colours

FIFA ranking
- Current: 123 ▼3 (17 July 2014)
- Highest: 120 (June 2014)
- Lowest: 202 (February 2008)

The Aruba National Football team (Dutch, "Arubaans voetbalelftal"; Papiamento, "Seleccion Arubano di futbol" is the official football team under 20 of Aruba and is controlled by the Arubaanse Voetbal Bond.

== History ==
=== Road to the 2015 Championship ===
During the 1st round of qualification they were placed in group 4 along with Grenada, and Dominica. Aruba defeated both team with 1–0 win to qualify to the final round. During the final round they were placed in group B along with Haiti, Dominican Republic and Saint Kitts and Nevis. They would beat the Dominican Republic and Saint Kitts and Nevis both with 2–1 win, unfortunately lose to Haiti with 2–1 defeat. They would get second in the group and face off against Cuba which they lost 2-1. Their goalkeeper Jean Marc Antersijn, would win the Golden Glove, and they would win the Fair Play Award. This would be their first time competing in the CONCACAF Championship. They were later placed in group A along with host Jamaica, Trinidad and Tobago, Panama, United States, and Guatemala.

=== 2015 Championship ===
On Aruba debut in the 2015 CONCACAF U-20 Championship the team would find it difficult to win a single game in the tournament. The team would go on to lose 4 out of the 5 games, drawing with host Jamaica in a 0–0 scoreline in their final game.

== Current squad ==
- The following players were called up for the 2022 CONCACAF U-20 Championship.
- Match dates: 18 June – 3 July 2022
- Caps and goals correct as of: 19 June 2022
- Names in italics denote players who have been capped for the senior team.

No.	Pos.	Player	Date of birth (age)	Caps	Goals	Club
1	GK	Jahmani Eisden	19 July 2005 (age 21)	0	0	(Aruba Football Federation) Dakota
13	GK	Samir Erasmus	9 November 2003 (age 23)	0	0	(Aruba Football Federation) RCA
2	DF	Anthony Maduro	2 March 2004 (age 22)	0	0	(Aruba Football Federation) Estrella
14	DF	José Robles	28 October 2003 (age 23)	0	0	Unknown
15	DF	Nathan Solagnier	29 August 2004 (age 22)	0	0	Unknown
20	DF	Basley Merveille	2 March 2005 (age 21)	0	0	Unknown
3	MF	Ezekiel Frans	22 November 2003 (age 22)	0	0	Unknown
4	MF	Jaybrien Romano	13 December 2004 (age 21)	0	0	Unknown
6	MF	Bernard Smolders	26 May 2004 (age 22)	0	0	(Aruba Football Federation) River Plate Aruba
8	MF	Milan Bouwer	28 April 2003 (age 23)	0	0	Unknown
9	MF	Mishawn Molina	16 January 2005 (age 21)	0	0	(Royal Dutch Football Association) Excelsior
11	MF	Ludgeneson de Cuba	15 January 2005 (age 21)	0	0	(Aruba Football Federation) RCA
12	MF	Bryaden Koolman	10 February 2005 (age 21)	0	0	(Aruba Football Federation) Estrella
16	MF	Quion Poppen	15 April 2005 (age 21)	0	0	(Royal Dutch Football Association) Spartaan '20
18	MF	Joey Franken	11 April 2005 (age 21)	0	0	(German Football Association) Portugal SV Witten
5	FW	Kymani Nedd	10 June 2004 (age 22)	0	0	(Royal Dutch Football Association) Excelsior
7	FW	Terick Monsanto	7 February 2004 (age 22)	0	0	(Royal Dutch Football Association) Sparta Rotterdam
10	FW	Jaydon Dania	29 October 2004 (age 22)	0	0	(Royal Dutch Football Association) AFC '34
17	FW	Javier Valerio	18 January 2003 (age 23)	0	0	(Royal Dutch Football Association) VVV-Venlo
19	FW	Evander Nedd	28 December 2005 (age 20)	0	0	(Aruba Football Federation) RCA

== See also ==
; Aruba U20 Team
