= Aruba Football Federation =

Governing body of football in Aruba

CONCACAF
- Founded: 29 January 1932; 94 years ago
- Headquarters: Noord, Aruba
- FIFA affiliation: 1988
- CONCACAF affiliation: 1986
- CFU affiliation: 1986
- President: Egbert Laclé
- Website: www.avbaruba.com

The Aruba Football Federation (Dutch: Arubaanse Voetbal Bond) is the governing body of football in Aruba. Its headquarters are at the Angel Botta technical centre in the city of Noord. It is a member of FIFA and CONCACAF, and is responsible for governing amateur and professional football, including the men's, women's, and youth national teams. The AVB is also responsible for sanctioning referees and football tournaments for most football leagues in Aruba.

== History ==
The first football competition in Aruba was organized in 1921. In 1930, a national team was organized, and played their first international match against Curaçao. The AVB was formed late in 1930 and became an official organization in 1932.

From the 1950s to the 1980s, Aruban football existed under the umbrella of the Netherlands Antillean Football Union (NAVU). In 1986, Aruba changed from a member of the Netherlands Antilles to its own constituent country of the Netherlands. With this change in political status, the AVB was granted membership to CONCACAF in 1986 and to FIFA in 1988. It has also been a member of the Caribbean Football Union since 1986.

== Professional leagues and tournaments ==
The Division di Honor is the first division men's football league in Aruba and is overseen by the AVB. It comprises 10 teams and participates in promotion and relegation with Aruban Division Uno, the second division league. The bottom four teams in the Division di Honor and the top eight teams in Division Uno compete to play in the Division di Honor the next season, with four spots available. The AVB also runs the women's football league, and U-20 teams.

Since 2005, the AVB has operated the Betico Croes Tournament Cup for men's teams.

== National teams ==
The AVB organizes the Aruba men's national football team and Aruba women's national football team.

== Association staff ==
Current as of 6 May 2026, according to the FIFA website for the AVB.

Name	Position
(Aruba) Egbert Lacle	President
(Aruba) Dyane Wiersma	Vice President
(Aruba) Francois Croes	Technical Director
(Aruba) Marvic Bermúdez	Team Coach (Men's)
(Netherlands) Arjan van der Laan	Team Coach (Women's)
(Aruba) Monique Ras	Referee Coordinator
