= Francois Croes =

Aruban footballer

Personal information
- Full name: Francois Croes
- Date of birth: 11 October 1990 (age 36)
- Place of birth: Oranjestad, Aruba
- Height: 1.85 m (6 ft 1 in)
- Position: Centre back

Team information
- Current team: SV Estrella
- Number: 21

Senior career*
Years	Team	Apps	(Gls)
2006–2021	SV Estrella		

International career
- Aruba U17
2008–2021	Aruba	22	(0)
- * Club domestic league appearances and goals

Francois Croes (born 11 October 1990) is a former football (soccer) player and member of the Aruba national football team. His playing position is centre back.
