= Raymond Baten =

Aruban footballer

Personal information
- Full name: Raymond Baten
- Date of birth: 26 January 1989 (age 37)
- Place of birth: Delft, Netherlands
- Position: Midfielder

Youth career
- Vitesse Delft
- ADO Den Haag
- Ajax

Senior career*
Years	Team	Apps	(Gls)
2008–2012	Voorschoten '97		
2012–2013	Rijnvogels		
2013–2014	Westlandia		
2014–2017	Quick		
2017–2018	De Dijk	27	(4)
2018–2019	Quick Boys	27	(4)
2019–2022	Quick		

International career^{‡}
2011–2015	Aruba	16	(3)
- * Club domestic league appearances and goals as of 13:00, 26 July 2018 (UTC) ‡ National team caps and goals as of 10:33, 31 August 2021 (UTC)

Raymond Baten (born 26 January 1989) is an Aruban retired footballer who played as a midfielder.

== Club career ==
Born in Delft, Baten started playing youth football at local side Vitesse Delft and in the academies of ADO Den Haag and Ajax. He has played for senior teams Voorschoten '97, FC Rijnvogels, RKVV Westlandia, Quick (H) and ASV De Dijk, whom he joined in 2017. He returned to Quick after a spell at Quick Boys in January 2020.

== International career ==
He made his international debut for Aruba in 2011.

=== International goals ===
Scores and results list Aruba's goal tally first.

No.	Date	Venue	Opponent	Score	Result	Competition
1.	23 September 2012	Kensington Oval, Bridgetown, Barbados	Dominican Republic	1–0	2–2	2012 Caribbean Cup qualification
2.	27 March 2014	Trinidad Stadium, Oranjestad, Aruba	Guam	1–0	2–2	Friendly
3.	9 September 2018	Ergilio Hato Stadium, Willemstad, Curaçao	Bermuda	2–0	3–1	2019–20 CONCACAF Nations League qualification
