= Elvis Albertus =

Aruban football manager

Personal information
- Full name: Elvis Albertus
- Date of birth: 23 December 1966 (age 59)
- Place of birth: Aruba

Managerial career
- Years: Team
- ?–2009: SV La Fama
- 2010–2012: Aruba
- RCA
- Dakota
- Riverplate
- 2018–2019: Sint Maarten

Elvis (Epi) Albertus (born 23 December 1966), is a former Aruban football manager. He has coached the Aruba national football team.
