= Rovien Ostiana =

Aruban footballer

Personal information
- Date of birth: 14 February 2002 (age 24)
- Place of birth: Rotterdam, Netherlands
- Height: 1.85 m (6 ft 1 in)
- Position: Midfielder

Team information
- Current team: Walton & Hersham
- Number: 6

Youth career
- –2014: SVV
- 2014–2016: Brentford
- 2016–2018: Queens Park Rangers
- 2018–2020: Cambridge United
- 2020–2021: Enfield Town
- 2021–2022: Kozakken Boys

Senior career*
Years	Team	Apps	(Gls)
2022–2023	Volendam II	8	(0)
2024–2025	RKAVV		
2025–2026	TOGB	13	(1)
2026	La Fama	2	(0)
2026	VV Zwaluwen	0	(0)
2026–	Walton & Hersham	0	(0)

International career^{‡}
2023–	Aruba	24	(9)
- * Club domestic league appearances and goals as of 21:03, 24 September 2026 (UTC) ‡ National team caps and goals as of 03:32, 17 November 2026 (UTC)

Rovien Ostiana (born 14 February 2002) is a professional footballer who plays as a midfielder for Walton & Hersham and the Aruba national team. With nine international goals, he is Aruba's all-time record scorer.

== Club career ==
As a youth, Ostiana played for SV SVV beginning in at least 2013. In 2014 he moved to England and had stints with Brentford, Queens Park Rangers, and Cambridge United. For the 2020/2021 season, he moved to non-league club Enfield Town of the Isthmian League Premier Division, suiting up for the under-19 team.

Ostiana returned to the Netherlands in 2021, signing for Kozakken Boys. In July 2022, he moved to Jong Volendam of the Tweede Divisie. Team manager Kizito Musampa stated that Ostiana was his ideal image of a true number six. Shortly after joining the club, he appeared in a 8–0 friendly victory over SV De Rijp. He was joined on the Volendam roster by fellow Dutch Caribbean player Quincy Hoeve, a Bonaire international. In August 2023 the two players linked up in a league match against Koninklijke HFC.

In July 2024, Ostiana went on trial with VV Smitshoek. Soon thereafter he debuted in a pre-season match against SteDoCo, but was played out of his natural position because of the absence of some squad members. He then competed in a local derby match against BVV Barendrecht. By September 2024, Ostiana had joined of RKAVV the Vierde Divisie. In July 2025, he moved to TOGB of the Derde Divisie.

After spells at La Fama and VV Zwaluwen, Ostiana returned to England and joined National League South side Walton & Hersham in September 2026. He debuted for the club in a 2026–27 FA Cup qualifying loss to Horsham on 19 September.

== International career ==
Ostiana made his senior international debut for Aruba on 11 September 2023 in a 2023–24 CONCACAF Nations League C match against the Cayman Islands. He scored his first goal for the national team in the second minute of the eventual 2–1 victory. On the next matchday, Ostiana scored his second goal in two matches as Aruba defeated the United States Virgin Islands to remain undefeated and top its group. Following the matchday, he was named to the League C Best XI for his performance.

With nine international goals, Ostiana is the current all-time top scorer for Aruba.

== Career statistics ==
=== International ===
As of match played 16 November 2026

Appearances and goals by national team and year
National team	Year	Apps	Goals
Aruba	2023	4	5
Aruba	2024	9	2
Aruba	2025	4	1
Aruba	2026	7	1
Total		24	9

Scores and results list Aruba's goal tally first.

List of international goals scored by Rovien Ostiana
No.	Date	Venue	Opponent	Score	Result	Competition
1.	11 September 2023	Truman Bodden Sports Complex, George Town, Cayman Islands	Cayman Islands	1–0	2–1	2023–24 CONCACAF Nations League C
2.	14 October 2023	Trinidad Stadium, Oranjestad, Aruba	U.S. Virgin Islands	1–0	3–1	2023–24 CONCACAF Nations League C
3.	16 November 2023	Bethlehem Soccer Stadium, Christiansted, U.S. Virgin Islands	U.S. Virgin Islands	2–0	4–1	2023–24 CONCACAF Nations League C
4.	16 November 2023	Bethlehem Soccer Stadium, Christiansted, U.S. Virgin Islands	U.S. Virgin Islands	3–1	4–1	2023–24 CONCACAF Nations League C
5.	20 November 2023	Trinidad Stadium, Oranjestad, Aruba	Cayman Islands	2–0	5–1	2023–24 CONCACAF Nations League C
6.	14 October 2024	Trinidad Stadium, Oranjestad, Aruba	Haiti	1–0	3–5	2024–25 CONCACAF Nations League B
7.	14 October 2024	Trinidad Stadium, Oranjestad, Aruba	Haiti	2–1	3–5	2024–25 CONCACAF Nations League B
8.	25 March 2025	Olympic Stadium, Phnom Penh, Cambodia	Cambodia	2–0	2–1	Friendly
9.	29 September 2026	Sir Vivian Richards Stadium, North Sound, Antigua and Barbuda	Anguilla	1–0	2–0	2026–27 CONCACAF Nations League C
