= Martin Koopman =

Dutch footballer and manager

Personal information
- Full name: Martin Koopman
- Date of birth: 5 June 1956 (age 70)
- Place of birth: Wezep, Netherlands
- Position: Defender

Senior career*
Years	Team	Apps	(Gls)
1976–1982	Go Ahead Eagles		
1982–1990	FC Twente		
1990–1991	SC Cambuur		

Managerial career
- 1989–1991: Cambuur (youth coach)
- 1991–1994: Cambuur (assistant)
- 1994–1996: Go Ahead Eagles (assistant)
- 1997–1999: FC Groningen (assistant)
- 1999–2000: FC Den Bosch
- 2000–2002: BV Veendam
- 2000–2000: AS Vita Club
- 2002–2004: Saudi Arabia (assistant)
- 2005–2006: Shenyang Ginde
- 2006–2008: Roda JC (assistant)
- 2008–2011: Roda JC
- 2011–2012: Al Nasr
- 2014–2015: RKC Waalwijk
- 2017–2019: Aruba
- 2019–2021: Maldives
- 2023–: Hearts of Oak
- * Club domestic league appearances and goals as of 1 June 2014 (UTC)

Martin Koopman (born 5 June 1956 in Wezep) is a Dutch former football defender, who played for Go Ahead Eagles, FC Twente and Cambuur Leeuwarden. He could also play as a midfielder. After 2 years as a youth coach then 8 as an assistant coach (1989 to 1999), he became a football manager in 1999.

In 2019 he was appointed manager of the Maldives national team. In July 2021, just 3 games into his 4-year contract, the Maldives qualified for the first time in history.

== Managerial statistics ==
As of 15 June 2021

Managerial record by team and tenure
Team	From	To	Record					Ref.
Team	From	To	P	W	D	L	Win %	Ref.
Den Bosch	14 September 1998	29 February 2000	58	26	13	19	44.8	
Veendam	1 July 2000	30 June 2002	34	13	6	15	38.2	
Guangzhou	1 January 2005	30 June 2007	1	0	1	0	0.0	
Roda (Caretaker)	7 October 2008	19 November 2008	7	3	1	3	42.9	
Al-Nasr SC	1 February 2012	30 June 2012	17	10	6	1	58.8	
RKC Waalwijk	1 July 2014	11 February 2015	29	5	4	20	17.2	
Aruba	15 January 2017	31 December 2019	10	1	1	8	10.0	
Maldives	27 January 2020	13 August 2021	3	0	1	2	0.0	
Total			159	58	33	68	36.5	—
