= 2026 FIFA Series (men's matches) =

Tournament details
- Host countries: Australia; Azerbaijan; Indonesia; Kazakhstan; New Zealand; Puerto Rico; Rwanda; Uzbekistan
- Dates: 25–31 March
- Teams: 34 (from 6 confederations)
- Venues: 11 (in 9 host cities)

Final positions
- Champions: Australia; Aruba; Azerbaijan; Bulgaria; Finland; Kazakhstan; Puerto Rico; Rwanda; Uzbekistan

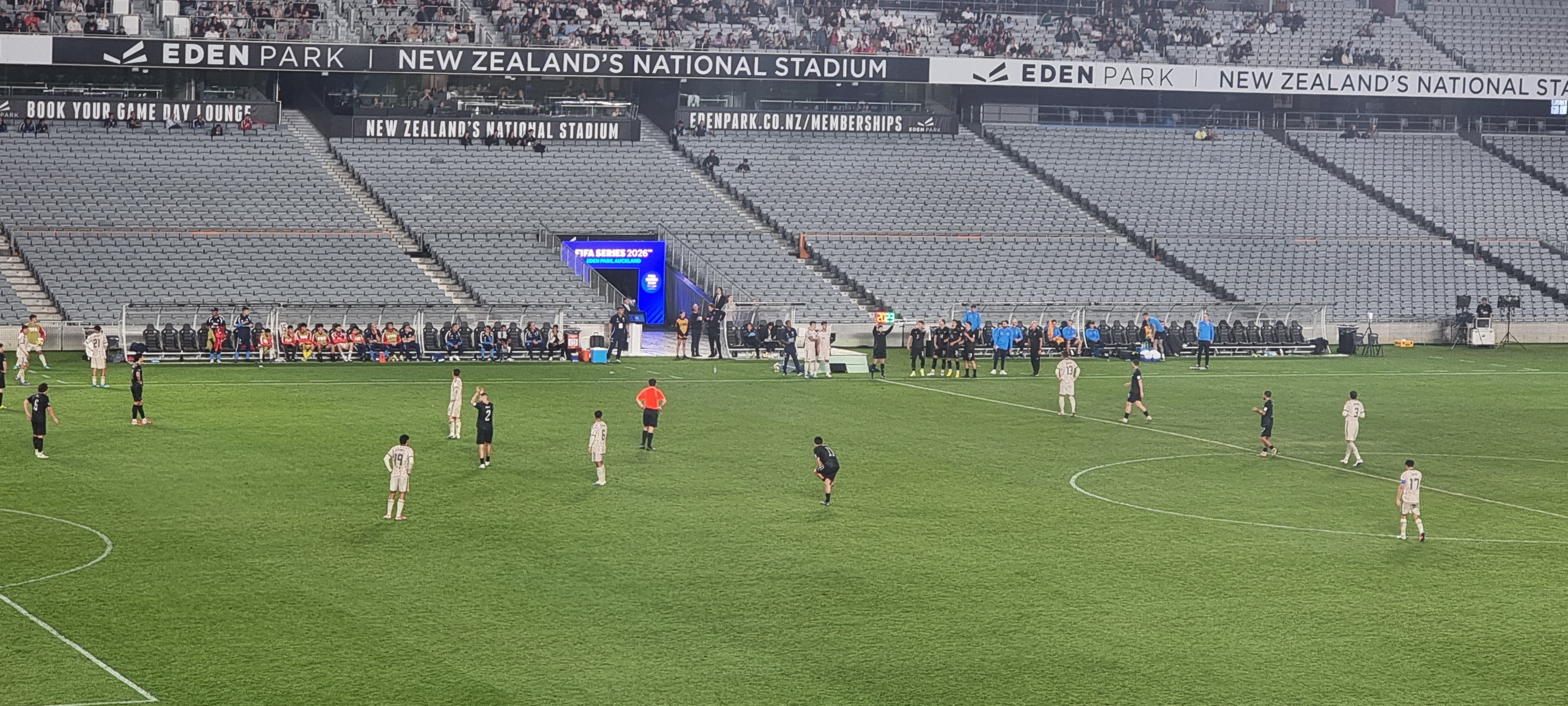
Match between New Zealand and Chile on 30 March 2026 at Eden Park, Auckland, New Zealand.

The 2026 FIFA Series was the second edition of the FIFA Series, an invitational association football tournament promoted by FIFA that features friendly matches between national teams from different continental confederations. The men's section of the 2026 edition featured nine different series (with three or four teams each) taking place across eight host countries during the FIFA window of 25–31 March. Unlike the prior 2024 FIFA Series, this edition named the winners of each nine series as joint champions of the competition.

== Background ==
Following the success of the pilot phase of the tournament, FIFA president Gianni Infantino announced the second edition for 2026 during the 74th FIFA Congress in Bangkok, Thailand in May 2024. On 18 October 2024, FIFA invited member associations to host and/or participate in the 2026 edition. Member associations could apply to organize one or more four-team series (which could include their own national team) or to participate in a series in which they would contest two matches against opponents of the similar level and/or different continental confederations.

Initially, nine host countries were announced, including Australia, Azerbaijan, Indonesia, Kazakhstan, Mauritius, Puerto Rico, Rwanda and Uzbekistan, with New Zealand joining later. However, Mauritius had to withdraw from organizing their series as their national team had to compete in the 2027 Africa Cup of Nations qualification preliminary round during the same FIFA window in March 2026, so this series was moved to Rwanda, which hosted two series, reducing the number of host countries to eight.

== Participating teams ==
Originally, 36 teams (divided into nine four-team series) were scheduled to participate in this edition. The number of teams was later reduced to 34 following the withdrawal of Oman and Kuwait due to extraordinary circumstances related to the 2026 Iran war, leaving the Azerbaijan and Kazakhstan series with only 3 teams each.

- H = Hosts

Series	Team	Confederation	FIFA Rankings January 2026
Australia	Australia (H)	AFC	27
Australia	Cameroon	CAF	45
Australia	China	AFC	93
Australia	Curaçao	CONCACAF	81
Azerbaijan	Azerbaijan (H)	UEFA	127
Azerbaijan	Saint Lucia	CONCACAF	167
Azerbaijan	Sierra Leone	CAF	120
Indonesia	Bulgaria	UEFA	87
Indonesia	Indonesia (H)	AFC	122
Indonesia	Saint Kitts & Nevis	CONCACAF	154
Indonesia	Solomon Islands	OFC	152
Kazakhstan	Comoros	CAF	106
Kazakhstan	Kazakhstan (H)	UEFA	114
Kazakhstan	Namibia	CAF	118
New Zealand	Cape Verde	CAF	67
New Zealand	Chile	CONMEBOL	55
New Zealand	Finland	UEFA	75
New Zealand	New Zealand (H)	OFC	85
Puerto Rico	American Samoa	OFC	184
Puerto Rico	Guam	AFC	201
Puerto Rico	Puerto Rico (H)	CONCACAF	156
Puerto Rico	U.S. Virgin Islands	CONCACAF	207
Rwanda A	Estonia	UEFA	129
Rwanda A	Grenada	CONCACAF	164
Rwanda A	Kenya	CAF	113
Rwanda A	Rwanda (H)	CAF	130
Rwanda B	Aruba	CONCACAF	191
Rwanda B	Liechtenstein	UEFA	205
Rwanda B	Macau	AFC	193
Rwanda B	Tanzania	CAF	110
Uzbekistan	Gabon	CAF	86
Uzbekistan	Trinidad & Tobago	CONCACAF	97
Uzbekistan	Uzbekistan (H)	AFC	52
Uzbekistan	Venezuela	CONMEBOL	50

=== By confederation ===
Confederation	Number of teams
AFC	6
CAF	9
CONCACAF	8
CONMEBOL	2
OFC	3
UEFA	6

== Venues ==
Location of the 2026 FIFA Series venues

Country	City	Stadium	Capacity
Australia	Sydney	Accor Stadium	83,000
Australia	Melbourne	AAMI Park	30,500
Azerbaijan	Sumgait	Sumgayit City Stadium	9,502
Indonesia	Jakarta	Gelora Bung Karno Stadium	77,193
Kazakhstan	Astana	Astana Arena	30,244
New Zealand	Auckland	Eden Park	50,000
Puerto Rico	Bayamón	Juan Ramón Loubriel Stadium	12,500
Rwanda	Kigali	Amahoro Stadium	45,508
Rwanda	Kigali	Kigali Pelé Stadium	7,000
Uzbekistan	Tashkent	Bunyodkor Stadium	34,800
Uzbekistan	Tashkent	Pakhtakor Central Stadium	35,000

== Format ==
Given that the FIFA International Match Calendar of March 2026 allowed only two matches per team, each series was played under one of the following two formats, as agreed upon by the participating member associations:

- Pre-arranged fixtures, in which each team faced two of the other three teams in their series.
- A Final four format, with semi-finals and finals played in single-leg knockout matches.

In each series, regardless of the format, a winner was declared. Any match that ended in a draw in regular time was decided directly by a penalty shoot-out, with no extra time. In series using the pre-arranged fixtures format, a victory on penalties awarded an additional point to the winner for the sole purpose of standings, with the draw remaining the official result of the match.

== Series ==
All times are local as listed by FIFA. Each team's confederation is indicated in brackets.

=== Australia ===
The FIFA Series Australia took place in Sydney on 27 March 2026 and Melbourne on 31 March 2026. It involved the hosts Australia (AFC), China (AFC), Cameroon (CAF) and Curaçao (CONCACAF).

Pos	Team	Pld	W	PW	PL	L	GF	GA	GD	Pts
1	Australia (H, C)	2	2	0	0	0	6	1	+5	6
2	Cameroon	2	1	0	0	1	2	1	+1	3
3	China	2	1	0	0	1	2	2	0	3
4	Curaçao	2	0	0	0	2	1	7	−6	0

(C) Champion; (H) Host
27 March 2026
17:00 UTC+11

China	2–0	Curaçao
Wei Shihao 45+2'; Zhang Yuning 59'	Report

Stadium Australia, Sydney
Attendance: 7,578
Referee: Alex King (Australia)
27 March 2026
20:10 UTC+11

Australia	1–0	Cameroon
Bos 85'	Report

Stadium Australia, Sydney
Attendance: 23,798
Referee: Robert Jones (England)

31 March 2026
17:00 UTC+11

Cameroon	2–0	China
Etta Eyong 3'; Alioum 9'	Report

Melbourne Rectangular Stadium, Melbourne
Referee: Alireza Faghani (Australia)
31 March 2026
20:10 UTC+11

Australia	5–1	Curaçao
Mabil 23'; Circati 67'; Bos 71'; Irankunda 80', 84'	Report	Martha 50'

Melbourne Rectangular Stadium, Melbourne
Attendance: 16,764
Referee: Andrew Madley (England)

=== Azerbaijan ===
The FIFA Series Azerbaijan took place in Sumgait on 27 and 30 March 2026, and involved the hosts Azerbaijan (UEFA), Saint Lucia (CONCACAF) and Sierra Leone (CAF). Oman (AFC) was initially going to participate, but withdrew due to the 2026 Iran war, leading to a change in the series’ match schedule, with the hosts Azerbaijan facing Saint Lucia and Sierra Leone in just two matches instead of the four single-leg knockout matches originally scheduled.

27 March 2026
19:10 UTC+4 (Note: The kickoff of the Azerbaijan v Saint Lucia match, originally scheduled for 19:00 local time, was delayed until 19:10 local time due to weather conditions and traffic congestion.)

Azerbaijan	6–1	Saint Lucia
Mahmudov 2' (pen.); Sadıxov 21'; Qurbanlı 37'; T. Bayramov 64'; Isgandarli 86'; Akhmedzade 89'	Report	Phillip 52' (pen.)

Sumgayit City Stadium, Sumgait
Attendance: 1,450
Referee: Giorgi Kruashvili (Georgia)

30 March 2026
19:00 UTC+4

Azerbaijan	1–1	Sierra Leone
R. Mammadov 72'	Report	D. Kanu 28'
Penalties
T. Bayramov (penalty scored); K. Alıyev (penalty scored); Isgandarli (penalty scored); A. Guseynov (penalty missed); Sadykhov (penalty scored); R. Akhmedzade (penalty scored); Khaybulayev (penalty scored); Kryvotsyuk (penalty scored); R. Mammadov (penalty scored); B. Guseynov (penalty scored)	9–8	(penalty missed) A. Koroma; (penalty scored) Kaikai; (penalty scored) Gandi; (penalty scored) Kamara; (penalty scored) Quee; (penalty scored) Bah; (penalty scored) Kallon; (penalty scored) Jarjue Kabia; (penalty scored) N. Jalloh; (penalty missed) Turay

Sumgayit City Stadium, Sumgait
Referee: Asker Nadjafaliev (Uzbekistan)

=== Indonesia ===
The FIFA Series Indonesia took place in Jakarta, and involved the hosts Indonesia (AFC), Bulgaria (UEFA), Saint Kitts and Nevis (CONCACAF) and the Solomon Islands (OFC).

==== Bracket ====
Semi-finals
27 March – Jakarta
Indonesia	4
Saint Kitts and Nevis	0
27 March – Jakarta
Solomon Islands	2
Bulgaria	10

Final
30 March – Jakarta
Indonesia	0
Bulgaria	1
Third place play-off
30 March – Jakarta
Saint Kitts and Nevis	4
Solomon Islands	2

==== Semi-finals ====
27 March 2026
15:30 UTC+7

Solomon Islands	2–10	Bulgaria
Lea'i 29' (pen.), 70'	Report	Petkov 5', 45+2'; Yordanov 13' (pen.); Krastev 39', 44'; Nikolov 53', 81', 90+3'; Rusev 63' (pen.); Balov 65'

Gelora Bung Karno Stadium, Jakarta
Attendance: 2,248
Referee: Naufal Adya Fairuski (Indonesia)

27 March 2026
20:00 UTC+7

Indonesia	4–0	Saint Kitts and Nevis
Beckham 15', 25'; Romeny 53'; Zijlstra 75'	Report

Gelora Bung Karno Stadium, Jakarta
Attendance: 26,703
Referee: Muhammad Taqi (Singapore)

==== Third place play-off ====
30 March 2026
16:45 UTC+7 (Note: The kickoff of the Saint Kitts & Nevis v Solomon Islands match, originally scheduled for 15:30 local time, was delayed for 75 minutes due to a thunderstorm and unfavorable weather conditions.)

Saint Kitts and Nevis	4–2	Solomon Islands
Sterling-James 30'; Mango 43' (o.g.); Kelly 75'; Panayiotou 86'	Report	Keana 36'; Fordney 85'

Gelora Bung Karno Stadium, Jakarta
Referee: Thoriq Alkatiri (Indonesia)

==== Final ====
30 March 2026
20:00 UTC+7

Indonesia	0–1	Bulgaria
	Report	Petkov 38' (pen.)

Gelora Bung Karno Stadium, Jakarta
Attendance: 24,174
Referee: Nazmi Nasaruddin (Malaysia)

=== Kazakhstan ===
The FIFA Series Kazakhstan took place in Astana from 25 March to 31 March 2026, and involved the hosts Kazakhstan (UEFA), Comoros (CAF) and Namibia (CAF). Kuwait (AFC) was initially going to participate, but withdrew due to the 2026 Iran war, leading to a change in the series’ match schedule, with only three round-robin matches instead of the four single-leg knockout matches originally scheduled.

Pos	Team	Pld	W	PW	PL	L	GF	GA	GD	Pts
1	Kazakhstan (H, C)	2	2	0	0	0	3	0	+3	6
2	Namibia	2	0	1	0	1	0	2	−2	2
3	Comoros	2	0	0	1	1	0	1	−1	1

(C) Champion; (H) Host
25 March 2026
17:00 UTC+5

Kazakhstan	2–0	Namibia
Vorogovskiy 12'; Kasym 79'	Report

Astana Arena, Astana
Attendance: 11,894
Referee: Viktar Shymusik (Belarus)

28 March 2026
17:00 UTC+5

Namibia	0–0	Comoros
	Report
Penalties
Hanamub (penalty scored); Muzeu (penalty scored); Petrus (penalty scored); Rudath (penalty scored); Kambato (penalty scored)	5–4	(penalty scored) Kari; (penalty scored) Id. Mohamed; (penalty missed) Ali; (penalty scored) Abdallah; (penalty scored) Mroivili

Astana Arena, Astana
Referee: Arman Ismuratov (Kazakhstan)

31 March 2026
17:00 UTC+5

Kazakhstan	1–0	Comoros
Orazov 4'	Report

Astana Arena, Astana
Attendance: 5,341
Referee: Ishmael Barbara (Malta)

=== New Zealand ===
The FIFA Series New Zealand took place in Auckland on 27 and 30 March 2026, and involved the hosts New Zealand (OFC), Cape Verde (CAF), Chile (CONMEBOL) and Finland (UEFA). All fixtures were the first international meeting between the sides, except for New Zealand vs Chile, who had faced each other four times previously (all friendlies), with three wins for the South Americans and one scoreless draw.

Pos	Team	Pld	W	PW	PL	L	GF	GA	GD	Pts
1	Finland (C)	2	1	0	1	0	3	1	+2	4
2	New Zealand (H)	2	1	0	0	1	4	3	+1	3
3	Chile	2	1	0	0	1	5	6	−1	3
4	Cape Verde	2	0	1	0	1	3	5	−2	2

(C) Champion; (H) Host
27 March 2026
16:00 UTC+13

Chile	4–2	Cape Verde
Brereton 16'; M. Gutiérrez 58'; Loyola 67'; Tapia 79'	Report	Livramento 21'; Lopes Cabral 45+3'

Eden Park, Auckland
Referee: Calvin Berg (New Zealand)
27 March 2026
19:15 UTC+13

New Zealand	0–2	Finland
	Report	Pohjanpalo 25'; Oksanen 85'

Eden Park, Auckland
Attendance: 17,603
Referee: Casey Reibelt (Australia)

30 March 2026
16:00 UTC+13

Cape Verde	1–1	Finland
Pires 67'	Report	Skyttä 45+4'
Penalties
Lopes Cabral (penalty scored); J. Cabral (penalty missed); K. Pina (penalty scored); Da Costa (penalty scored); R. Mendes (penalty scored)	4–2	(penalty scored) Walta; (penalty scored) Valakari; (penalty missed) Keskinen; (penalty missed) Oksanen

Eden Park, Auckland
Attendance: 2,060
Referee: Anna-Marie Keighley (New Zealand)
30 March 2026
19:15 UTC+13

New Zealand	4–1	Chile
Barbarouses 31'; Just 40'; Randall 60'; Waine 71'	Report	Tapia 83'

Eden Park, Auckland
Attendance: 14,327
Referee: Jack Morgan (Australia)

=== Puerto Rico ===
The FIFA Series Puerto Rico took place in Bayamón, and involved the hosts Puerto Rico (CONCACAF), American Samoa (OFC), Guam (AFC), and the U.S. Virgin Islands (CONCACAF).

==== Bracket ====
Semi-finals
25 March – Bayamón
Puerto Rico	4
Guam	0
25 March – Bayamón
U.S. Virgin Islands	5
American Samoa	2

Final
28 March – Bayamón
Puerto Rico	2
U.S. Virgin Islands	0
Third place play-off
28 March – Bayamón
American Samoa	0
Guam	6

==== Semi-finals ====
25 March 2026
16:00 UTC−4

U.S. Virgin Islands	5–2	American Samoa
J. Ramos 7'; Penders 19', 20'; Liburd 53'; St. Louis 90+2' (pen.)	Report	Mitchell 80' (pen.), 82'

Juan Ramón Loubriel Stadium, Bayamón
Referee: José Torres (Puerto Rico)

25 March 2026
20:00 UTC−4

Puerto Rico	4–0	Guam
W. Rivera 52', 61'; R. Rivera 57'; Antonetti 76' (pen.)	Report

Juan Ramón Loubriel Stadium, Bayamón
Referee: José Corporán (Dominican Republic)

==== Third place play-off ====
28 March 2026
16:00 UTC−4

American Samoa	0–6	Guam
	Report	Mitchell 3' (o.g.); Berg 13', 35'; Ochoa 39' (pen.); Taitague 57'; Gomez 86'

Juan Ramón Loubriel Stadium, Bayamón
Referee: José Torres (Puerto Rico)

==== Final ====
28 March 2026
20:00 UTC−4

Puerto Rico	2–0	U.S. Virgin Islands
De León 19' (pen.); Shaffer 44' (o.g.)	Report

Juan Ramón Loubriel Stadium, Bayamón
Referee: Randy Encarnación (Dominican Republic)

=== Rwanda A ===
The FIFA Series Rwanda A took place in Kigali, and involved the hosts Rwanda (CAF), Estonia (UEFA), Grenada (CONCACAF) and Kenya (CAF).

==== Bracket ====
Semi-finals
27 March – Kigali (Amahoro)
Rwanda	4
Grenada	0
27 March – Kigali (Amahoro)
Kenya	1 (4)
Estonia (p)	1 (5)

Final
30 March – Kigali (Amahoro)
Rwanda	2
Estonia	0
Third place play-off
30 March – Kigali (Amahoro)
Grenada	0
Kenya	3

==== Semi-finals ====
27 March 2026
18:00 UTC+2

Kenya	1–1	Estonia
Ogam 51'	Report (UEFA); Report (FIFA)	Tammik 21'
Penalties
A. Odhiambo (penalty scored); Bajaber (penalty missed); Ouma (penalty scored); Erambo (penalty scored); Omondi (penalty scored); Odada (penalty missed)	4–5	(penalty scored) Tõugjas; (penalty missed) Yakovlev; (penalty scored) Larsen; (penalty scored) Tamm; (penalty scored) Sappinen; (penalty scored) Soomets

Amahoro Stadium, Kigali
Referee: Georges Gatogato (Burundi)

27 March 2026
21:00 UTC+2

Rwanda	4–0	Grenada
L. Mickels 45+2'; J. Kwizera 45+6'; Bizimana 69'; Sahabo 83'	Report

Amahoro Stadium, Kigali
Referee: Haimanot Adane (Ethiopia)

==== Third place play-off ====
30 March 2026
16:00 UTC+2 (Note: The third-place match and the final of the Rwanda A Series, originally scheduled for 18:00 and 21:00 local time, respectively, were brought forward to 16:00 and 19:30 local time at the request of the participating teams.)

Grenada	0–3	Kenya
	Report	A. Odhiambo 13'; Ogam 18'; Valcin 81' (o.g.)

Amahoro Stadium, Kigali
Attendance: 31,200
Referee: Ahmed Arajiga (Tanzania)

==== Final ====
30 March 2026
19:30 UTC+2

Rwanda	2–0	Estonia
Biramahire 30'; L. Mickels 51'	Report

Amahoro Stadium, Kigali
Referee: Ahmed Hassan Hussein (Somalia)

=== Rwanda B ===
The FIFA Series Rwanda B took place in Kigali, and involved Aruba (CONCACAF), Liechtenstein (UEFA), Macau (AFC), and Tanzania (CAF). Originally scheduled to take place in Mauritius, this series was moved to Rwanda after Mauritius withdrew from hosting it, with Tanzania replacing them in the matches.

==== Bracket ====
Semi-finals
26 March – Kigali (Kigali Pelé)
Aruba	4
Macau	1
26 March – Kigali (Kigali Pelé)
Tanzania	0
Liechtenstein	1

Final
29 March – Kigali (Kigali Pelé)
Aruba	4
Liechtenstein	1
Third place play-off
29 March – Kigali (Kigali Pelé)
Macau	0
Tanzania	6

==== Semi-finals ====
26 March 2026
13:30 UTC+2

Aruba	4–1	Macau
Fermina 5'; Romano 13', 16'; Van Kilsdonk 66'	Report	Leong Ka Hang 88'

Kigali Pelé Stadium, Kigali
Referee: Samuel Uwikunda (Rwanda)

26 March 2026
16:30 UTC+2

Tanzania	0–1	Liechtenstein
	Report	Sağlam 55'

Kigali Pelé Stadium, Kigali
Attendance: 4,500
Referee: Mohamed Diraneh (Djibouti)

==== Third place play-off ====
29 March 2026
15:00 UTC+2

Macau	0–6	Tanzania
	Report	Amâncio 16' (o.g.); Mwamnyeto 26'; Yahya 45'; Peter 56'; Miroshi 74'; Allarakhia 87'

Kigali Pelé Stadium, Kigali
Attendance: 12,900
Referee: Lucky Kasalirwe (Uganda)

==== Final ====
29 March 2026
18:00 UTC+2

Aruba	4–1	Liechtenstein
Romano 19'; Robertha 25'; Breinburg 69'; Hofer 90+4' (o.g.)	Report	Zünd 52'

Kigali Pelé Stadium, Kigali
Referee: Samuel Uwikunda (Rwanda)

=== Uzbekistan ===
The FIFA Series Uzbekistan took place in Tashkent on 27 and 30 March 2026, and involved the hosts Uzbekistan (AFC), Gabon (CAF), Trinidad and Tobago (CONCACAF) and Venezuela (CONMEBOL).

Pos	Team	Pld	W	PW	PL	L	GF	GA	GD	Pts
1	Uzbekistan (H, C)	2	1	1	0	0	3	1	+2	5
2	Venezuela	2	1	0	1	0	4	1	+3	4
3	Gabon	2	0	1	0	1	3	5	−2	2
4	Trinidad and Tobago	2	0	0	1	1	3	6	−3	1

(C) Champion; (H) Host
27 March 2026
15:00 UTC+5

Venezuela	4–1	Trinidad and Tobago
Alfonzo 60', 67'; Rondón 81', 85'	Report	Moore 52'

Pakhtakor Central Stadium, Tashkent
Attendance: 1,000
Referee: Rustam Lutfullin (Uzbekistan)
27 March 2026
19:00 UTC+5

Uzbekistan	3–1	Gabon
Shomurodov 14'; Urozov 59'; Odilov 90+4'	Report	Averlant 6'

Bunyodkor Stadium, Tashkent
Attendance: 28,840
Referee: Abdullo Davlatov (Tajikistan)

30 March 2026
15:00 UTC+5

Gabon	2–2	Trinidad and Tobago
Kanga 33'; Essang-Matouti 54'	Report	L. García 53', 90'
Penalties
Kanga (penalty scored); Lemina (penalty missed); Obiang (penalty missed); Mbemba (penalty scored); Mboula (penalty scored)	3–2	(penalty missed) Cardines; (penalty scored) Rochford; (penalty missed) Powder; (penalty scored) Moore; (penalty missed) L. García

Pakhtakor Central Stadium, Tashkent
Referee: Ilgiz Tantashev (Uzbekistan)
30 March 2026
19:00 UTC+5

Uzbekistan	0–0	Venezuela
	Report
Penalties
Iskanderov (penalty scored); Temirov (penalty scored); Ashurmatov (penalty scored); Shukurov (penalty scored); Mozgovoy (penalty scored)	5–4	(penalty scored) Rondón; (penalty scored) L. González; (penalty missed) Sosa; (penalty scored) Quintero; (penalty scored) Segovia

Bunyodkor Stadium, Tashkent
Attendance: 29,225
Referee: Mederbek Taichiev (Kyrgyzstan)

== Summary ==
2026 FIFA Series (men's) summary
Tournament	Champions	Runners-up	Third-place	Player of the tournament
Australia	Australia	Cameroon	China	(Australia) Nestory Irankunda
Azerbaijan	Azerbaijan	Sierra Leone	Saint Lucia	(Azerbaijan) Elvin Cafarguliyev
Indonesia	Bulgaria (2nd title)	Indonesia	Saint Kitts and Nevis	(Bulgaria) Marin Petkov
Kazakhstan	Kazakhstan	Namibia	Comoros	(Kazakhstan) Islam Chesnokov
New Zealand	Finland	New Zealand	Chile	(Finland) Naatan Skyttä
Puerto Rico	Puerto Rico	U.S. Virgin Islands	Guam	(Puerto Rico) Jeremy de León
Rwanda A	Rwanda	Estonia	Kenya	(Rwanda) Leroy-Jacques Mickels
Rwanda B	Aruba	Liechtenstein	Tanzania (2nd)	(Aruba) Jaybrien Romano
Uzbekistan	Uzbekistan	Venezuela	Gabon	(Uzbekistan) Abdukodir Khusanov

== See also ==
- 2026 FIFA Series (women's matches)
