= Theric Ruiz =

Aruban footballer (born 1984)

Personal information
- Date of birth: September 18, 1984 (age 42)
- Position: Defender

Team information
- Current team: SV Britannia
- Number: 5

International career
Years	Team	Apps	(Gls)
2004–2016	Aruba	24	(1)

Theric Ruiz (born September 18, 1984) is an Aruban football player. He played for the Aruba national team.

== National team statistics ==
Aruba national team
Year	Apps	Goals
2004	1	0
2005	0	0
2006	0	0
2007	0	0
2008	4	1
2009	0	0
2010	2	0
2011	2	0
2012	4	0
2013	1	0
2014	4	0
2015	4	0
2016	2	0
Total	24	1
