= FIFA Series =

- Organiser(s): FIFA
- Founded: 2024; 2 years ago
- Region: International
- Teams: Various
- Website: Official website
- 2026 FIFA Series (men's matches); 2026 FIFA Series (women's matches)

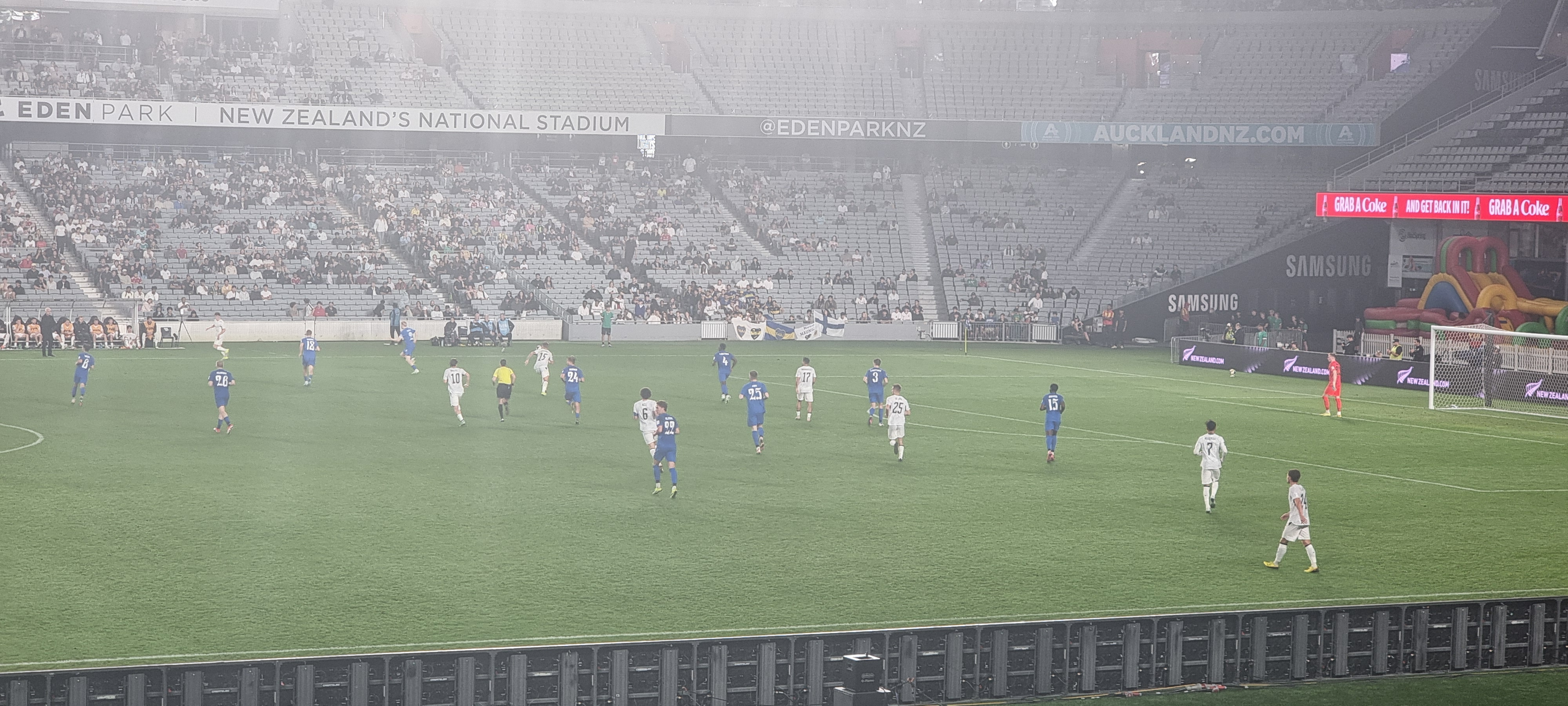
Match between New Zealand and Finland in the 2026 FIFA Series.

The FIFA Series is a biennial invitational football tournament promoted by FIFA that features international friendlies between national teams from different confederations, taking place in March of every even-numbered year. The first edition was in 2024 which featured five friendlies and one final championship match. The tournament brings together men's and women's national teams from all FIFA confederations in a series of mini-tournaments, each consisting of four teams at a centralised venue. FIFA provides financial support to the participating national teams and is in charge of organising the tournaments together with the host member association.

== History ==
On 16 December 2022, FIFA launched a friendly tournament proposal named the "FIFA World Series" in order to give national teams from different confederations more opportunities to play against each other. FIFA President Gianni Infantino confirmed the tournament on 16 March 2023, following his re-election to the post during the 73rd FIFA Congress in Kigali, Rwanda.

The inaugural edition was the 2024 FIFA Series for men's national teams was originally going to feature 5 series of 4 teams each to be held in 4 host countries during the FIFA match window from 18 to 26 March. Eventually, the FIFA Series: Egypt, a knock-out competition, was added for a total of 6 series and 24 teams in the inaugural edition. Following the success of the pilot phase, a second edition for 2026 was announced in May 2024. In November, 2025 FIFA announced that at least 8 associations would host games of the expanded tournament, as well as the debut of participation of women's national teams, held across 3 locations.

== Hosts ==
=== Men's ===
Year	Hosts	No. of series	No. of teams
2024	Algeria; Azerbaijan; Egypt; Saudi Arabia (Two groups); Sri Lanka	6	24
2026	Australia; Azerbaijan; Indonesia; Kazakhstan; New Zealand; Puerto Rico; Rwanda (Two groups); Uzbekistan	9	34

=== Women's ===
Year	Hosts	No. of series	No. of teams
2026	Brazil; Ivory Coast; Thailand; Kenya	4	16

== Team results by tournament ==
Legend

- 1st – Champions
- 2nd – Runners-up
- 3rd – Third place
- 4th – Fourth place
- — Hosts
- Q – Qualified for upcoming edition (invited)
- – – Did not enter
- × – Withdrew after being announced

=== Men's competition ===
Team	2024	2026	Years
AFC
Australia	–	1st	1
Bhutan	4th	–	1
Brunei	2nd	–	1
Cambodia	4th	–	1
China	–	3rd	1
Guam	–	3rd	1
Indonesia	–	2nd	1
Kuwait	–	x	0
Macau	–	4th	1
Mongolia	4th	–	1
Oman	–	x	0
Sri Lanka	2nd	–	1
Uzbekistan	–	1st	1
CAF
Algeria	1st	–	1
Cameroon	–	2nd	1
Cape Verde	1st	4th	2
Central African Republic	1st	–	1
Comoros	–	3rd	1
Egypt	2nd	–	1
Equatorial Guinea	3rd	–	1
Gabon	–	3rd	1
Guinea	1st	–	1
Kenya	–	3rd	1
Mauritius	–	x	0
Namibia	–	2nd	1
Rwanda	–	1st	1
South Africa	3rd	–	1
Sierra Leone	–	2nd	1
Tanzania	3rd	3rd	2
Tunisia	3rd	–	1
CONCACAF
Aruba	–	1st	1
Bermuda	3rd	–	1
Curaçao	–	4th	1
Grenada	–	4th	1
Guyana	2nd	–	1
Puerto Rico	–	1st	1
Saint Kitts and Nevis	–	3rd	1
Saint Lucia	–	3rd	1
U.S. Virgin Islands	–	2nd	1
Trinidad and Tobago	–	4th	1
CONMEBOL
Bolivia	2nd	–	1
Chile	–	3rd	1
Venezuela	–	2nd	1
OFC
American Samoa	–	4th	1
New Zealand	4th	2nd	2
Papua New Guinea	3rd	–	1
Solomon Islands	–	4th	1
Vanuatu	4th	–	1
UEFA
Andorra	4th	–	1
Azerbaijan	2nd	1st	2
Bulgaria	1st	1st	2
Croatia	1st	–	1
Estonia	–	2nd	1
Finland	–	1st	1
Kazakhstan	–	1st	1
Liechtenstein	–	2nd	1

=== Women's competition ===
Team	2026	Years
AFC
Australia	1st	1
India	3rd	1
Indonesia	3rd	1
Nepal	x	0
Pakistan	3rd	1
South Korea	3rd	1
Thailand	1st	1
CAF
DR Congo	2nd	1
Ivory Coast	1st	1
Mauritania	2nd	1
Malawi	4th	1
Kenya	2nd	1
Zambia	4th	1
CONCACAF
Canada	2nd	1
Turks and Caicos	4th	1
CONMEBOL
Brazil	1st	1
OFC
New Caledonia	4th	1

== Statistics ==
=== Medals ===
As of 19 April 2026

FIFA Series overall medal tally
Rank	Nation	Gold	Silver	Bronze	Total
1	Australia (AUS)	2	0	0	2
1	Bulgaria (BUL)	2	0	0	2
3	Azerbaijan (AZE)	1	1	0	2
4	Algeria (ALG)	1	0	0	1
4	Aruba (ARU)	1	0	0	1
4	Cape Verde (CPV)	1	0	0	1
4	Croatia (CRO)	1	0	0	1
4	Finland (FIN)	1	0	0	1
4	Guinea (GUI)	1	0	0	1
4	Ivory Coast (CIV)	1	0	0	1
4	Kazakhstan (KAZ)	1	0	0	1
4	Puerto Rico (PUR)	1	0	0	1
4	Rwanda (RWA)	1	0	0	1
4	Thailand (THA)	1	0	0	1
4	Uzbekistan (UZB)	1	0	0	1
16	Indonesia (IDN)	0	1	1	2
16	Kenya (KEN)	0	1	1	2
18	Bolivia (BOL)	0	1	0	1
18	Brunei (BRU)	0	1	0	1
18	Cameroon (CMR)	0	1	0	1
18	DR Congo (DRC)	0	1	0	1
18	Egypt (EGY)	0	1	0	1
18	Estonia (EST)	0	1	0	1
18	Guyana (GUY)	0	1	0	1
18	Liechtenstein (LIE)	0	1	0	1
18	Mauritania (MTN)	0	1	0	1
18	Namibia (NAM)	0	1	0	1
18	New Zealand (NZL)	0	1	0	1
18	Sierra Leone (SLE)	0	1	0	1
18	Sri Lanka (SRI)	0	1	0	1
18	U.S. Virgin Islands (VIR)	0	1	0	1
18	Venezuela (VEN)	0	1	0	1
33	Tanzania (TAN)	0	0	2	2
34	Bermuda (BER)	0	0	1	1
34	Chile (CHL)	0	0	1	1
34	China (CHN)	0	0	1	1
34	Comoros (COM)	0	0	1	1
34	Equatorial Guinea (EQG)	0	0	1	1
34	Gabon (GAB)	0	0	1	1
34	Guam (GUM)	0	0	1	1
34	India (IND)	0	0	1	1
34	Pakistan (PAK)	0	0	1	1
34	Papua New Guinea (PNG)	0	0	1	1
34	Saint Kitts and Nevis (SKN)	0	0	1	1
34	Saint Lucia (LCA)	0	0	1	1
34	South Africa (RSA)	0	0	1	1
34	Tunisia (TUN)	0	0	1	1
Totals (47 entries)		17	18	18	53

== See also ==
- AFC Challenge Cup
- AFC Solidarity Cup
