= Aruba national football team =

Men's association football team

Aruba
- Association: Arubaanse Voetbal Bond (AVB)
- Confederation: CONCACAF (North America)
- Sub-confederation: CFU (Caribbean)
- Head coach: Marvic Bermúdez
- Captain: Fernando Lewis
- Most caps: Nickenson Paul (36)
- Top scorer: Rovien Ostiana (9)
- Home stadium: Trinidad Stadium
- FIFA code: ARU
First colours	Second colours

FIFA ranking
- Current: 183 ▲2 (18 November 2026)
- Highest: 112 (November 2015)
- Lowest: 205 (April 2021)

First international
- Aruba 0–4 Curaçao (Aruba; 6 April 1924) as modern Aruba; Trinidad and Tobago 7–0 Aruba (Netherlands Antilles; 31 March 1989)

Biggest win
- (Netherlands) Aruba 8–1 Suriname (Netherlands) (Surinam; 6 June 1946) as modern Aruba; Aruba 7–0 British Virgin Islands (Oranjestad, Aruba; 1 June 2014)

Biggest defeat
- Aruba 0–9 Hungary (Netherlands Antilles; 12 December 1982) as modern Aruba; Trinidad and Tobago 11–0 Aruba (Arima, Trinidad and Tobago; 23 April 1989)

CCCF Championship
- Appearances: 1 (first in 1955)
- Best result: 5th place (1955)

The Aruba national football team (Dutch: Arubaans voetbalelftal; Papiamento: selekshon di futbòl Aruba) represents Aruba, a constituent country of the Kingdom of the Netherlands in men's international football, and is governed by the Aruba Football Federation (Dutch: Arubaanse Voetbal Bond), the governing body for football in Aruba founded in 1932. It has been a full member of FIFA and CONCACAF since 1988, and is also a member of CFU in the Caribbean Zone.

Aruba has never qualified for the FIFA World Cup and the CONCACAF Gold Cup, but has participated twice in League B and three times in League C of the CONCACAF Nations League.

Aruba's debut in international competitions was in the 1955 CCCF Championship, and its first appearance in World Cup qualifiers was for 1998 qualification. The team's first victory was in 1938 by defeating Suriname 5–0. After its separation of the Netherlands Antilles in 1986, the modern Aruba's first victory was in 1997 by defeating Netherlands Antilles 2–1.

== History ==
Between 1924 and 1933, Aruba only played against Curaçao, although these matches are not considered official. In the 1950s these matches were used to select the best players for the Netherlands Antilles team. Aruban players like Jani Brokke played for the Netherlands Antilles at the 1952 Olympic Games. Under the flag of the Curaçao Football Association (C.V.B.), they won gold with the Netherlands Antilles team at the 1950 Central American and Caribbean Games and participated in the 1953 CCCF Championship.

In the 1950s the A.V.B. organised friendly matches and mini tournaments on the island. Examples are the 1952 match between Aruba and football club Botafogo (3-1) and the 1953 series between Aruba, Surinam, British Guiana and professional club La Salle F.C. from Venezuela. Aruba participated in its first tournament at the 1955 CCCF Championship, where they finished in 5th place. In 1958, A.V.B. and C.V.B. merged into the Netherlands Antillean Football Union. Aruba took part in the Netherlands Antilles national team until their secession in 1986.

Following its split from the Netherlands Antilles, the Aruba Football Federation was affiliated in 1988 with CONCACAF and FIFA. Aruba entered qualifying for the 1989 Caribbean Cup, and in its first group match it suffered the worst defeat in its history, at the hands of Trinidad and Tobago, which crushed them 11–0. They played their first World Cup qualifying match against the Dominican Republic as part of the 1998 FIFA World Cup qualifying. Aruba has participated in all the qualifying tournaments for the World Cup since, without being able to get past the first qualifying round.

Aruba has also yet to qualify for the Caribbean Cup. However, they showed some progress in the preliminary round of the 2014 Caribbean Cup by getting two wins against Turks and Caicos (1–0) and British Virgin Islands (7–0), the latter being the biggest victory in its history. These results allowed them to reach 120th place in the FIFA World Ranking for the month of June 2014, their best ranking to date. Following these victories, Aruba lost 2–0 against French Guiana and were eliminated.

Aruba began their 2018 FIFA World Cup qualification in the second round against Barbados, losing 2–0 at home and 1–0 away, however FIFA ruled that Barbados had fielded an ineligible player, giving Aruba a 3–0 second leg victory and advancing them to the third round. Despite that, in the next round they were defeated again, this time by Saint Vincent and the Grenadines who won 3–2 on aggregate. Aruba failed to progress in the 2022 FIFA World Cup qualifiers, finishing 4th in the first round. In March 2025, Aruba then travel all the way to Southeast Asia to face against Cambodia in a friendly match which is also their first Asian opponents since 2014 against Guam.

In November 2026, after coming 2nd in League C, Aruba still qualified to the League C Championship facing Montserrat this also meant that Aruba qualified for the 2026–27 CONCACAF Nations League Play-in, in which Aruba faced Martinique, tying their first leg 0–0 at home and 1–1 away but advancing to the 2027 CONCACAF Gold Cup Prelims for the first time due to the Away goals rule. Their opponent is yet to be determined for the Prelims.

== Results and fixtures ==
The following is a list of match results in the last 12 months, as well as any future matches that have been scheduled.

Win Draw Loss Fixture

=== 2025 ===
12 November 2025–26 CONCACAF Series	Antigua and Barbuda	0–0	Aruba	North Sound, Antigua and Barbuda
19:00 UTC−4		Report		Stadium: Sir Vivian Richards Stadium

15 November 2025–26 CONCACAF Series	Barbados	0–3	Aruba	North Sound, Antigua and Barbuda
16:00 UTC−4		Report	Poulina 4'; Romano 59'; Fermina 76'	Stadium: Sir Vivian Richards Stadium; Referee: Evens Julmis (Bahamas)

=== 2026 ===
26 March 2026 FIFA Series	Aruba	4–1	Macau	Kigali, Rwanda
13:30 UTC+2	Fermina 5'; Romano 13', 16'; van Kilsdonk 66'	Report	Leong Ka Hang 88'	Stadium: Kigali Pelé Stadium; Referee: Samuel Uwikunda (Rwanda)

29 March 2026 FIFA Series	Aruba	4–1	Liechtenstein	Kigali, Rwanda
18:00 UTC+2	Romano 18'; Robertha 25'; Ostiana (yellow card) 48' (yellow-red card) 61'; Breinburg 69'; Hofer 90+4' (o.g.)	Report	Zünd 52'	Stadium: Kigali Pelé Stadium; Referee: Samuel Uwikunda (Rwanda)

6 June Friendly	Curaçao	4–0	Aruba	Willemstad, Curaçao
19:30 AST	Brenet 53'; Antonisse 68'; Comenencia 83'; Bacuna 90'	Report		Stadium: Ergilio Hato Stadium; Referee: José Corporán (Dominican Republic)

23 September 2026 2026–27 CONCACAF Nations League C	Aruba	1–0	Antigua and Barbuda	North Sound, Antigua and Barbuda
19:00 UTC−4	Molina 90+3'	Report		Stadium: Sir Vivian Richards Stadium; Attendance: 1,032; Referee: Olivier Jean Alexandre (Haiti)

29 September 2026 2026–27 CONCACAF Nations League C	Anguilla	0–2	Aruba	North Sound, Antigua and Barbuda
19:00 UTC−4		Report	Ostiana 53'; Figaroa 88'	Stadium: Sir Vivian Richards Stadium; Attendance: 117; Referee: Hakeem Harvey (Saint Kitts and Nevis)

4 October 2026 2026–27 CONCACAF Nations League C	Aruba	3–2	Anguilla	North Sound, Antigua and Barbuda
19:00 UTC−4	Fermina 7'; Mercera 90+3'; Peterson 90+4'	Report	Owen 39'; Fleming 77'	Stadium: Sir Vivian Richards Stadium; Attendance: 137; Referee: Juan Morales (Guatemala)

6 October 2026 2026–27 CONCACAF Nations League C	Antigua and Barbuda	3–2	Aruba	North Sound, Antigua and Barbuda
19:00 UTC−4	Tomlinson 5'; Bramble 11'; Satchell 86'	Report	Bennett 14'; Fermina 50'	Stadium: Sir Vivian Richards Stadium; Referee: Melvin Matamoros (Honduras)

12 November 2026 2026–27 CONCACAF Nations League Play-in	Aruba	0–0	Martinique	Oranjestad, Aruba
18:00 UTC−4		Report		Stadium: Trinidad Stadium; Referee: Drew Fischer (Canada)

16 November 2026 2026–27 CONCACAF Nations League Play-in	Martinique	1-1	Aruba	Fort-de-France, Martinique
20:00 UTC−4		Report		Stadium: Stade Pierre-Aliker

=== 2027 ===
March 2027 CONCACAF Gold Cup qualification	Aruba	v	Jamaica	TBD
TBD				Stadium: TBD

March 2027 CONCACAF Gold Cup qualification	Jamaica	v	Aruba	TBD
TBD				Stadium: TBD

June 2026–27 CONCACAF Nations League C Finals	Aruba	v	Montserrat	TBD
TBD				Stadium: TBD

== Coaching history ==
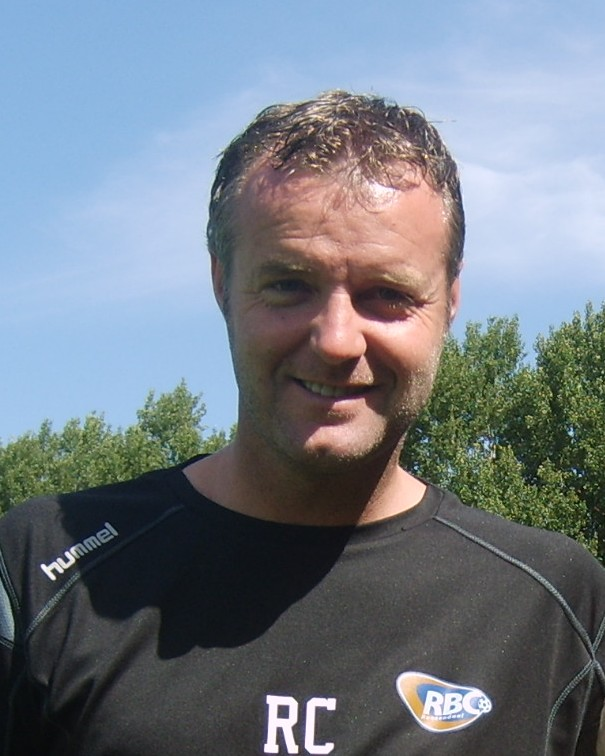
Rini Coolen became the manager of the national football team of Aruba in 2015

- (Netherlands) René Notten (1995)
- (Argentina) Ángel Botta (1996)
- (Aruba) Marco Rasmijn (2000)
- (Argentina) Marcelo Muñoz (2004)
- (Netherlands) Azing Griever (2004–2006)
- (Argentina) Marcelo Muñoz (2008–2010)
- (Aruba) Epi Albertus (2010–2012)
- (Netherlands) Giovanni Franken (2013–2015)
- (Netherlands) Rini Coolen (2015)
- (Netherlands) Martin Koopman (2015–2020)
- (Aruba) Marvic Bermúdez (2020)
- (Netherlands) Stanley Menzo (2021–2022)
- (Aruba) Marvic Bermúdez (2022–)

== Players ==
=== Current squad ===
The following players were called up for the 2026–27 CONCACAF Nations League C matches between 23 September and 6 October 2026, respectively.

Caps and goals correct as of 26 September 2026, after the match against Antigua and Barbuda.

No.	Pos.	Player	Date of birth (age)	Caps	Goals	Club
1	GK	Matthew Lentink	18 August 1993 (age 33)	29	0	(Royal Dutch Football Association) Kloetinge
18	GK	Josthan Maduro	30 August 2006 (age 20)	1	0	(Royal Dutch Football Association) SteDoCo
23	GK	Joey Zwaan	2 August 2005 (age 21)	0	0	(Italian Football Federation) Reggiana
22	DF	Rainey Breinburg	5 August 2005 (age 21)	3	1	(German Football Association) FC Emmelshausen-Karbach
15	DF	Gladwin Curiel	24 March 2002 (age 24)	4	0	(Gibraltar Football Association) Glacis United
13	DF	Tyrese Gijsbertha	22 December 2003 (age 22)	6	0	(Royal Dutch Football Association) ROHDA Raalte
4	DF	Bradley Martis	13 July 1998 (age 28)	7	0	(Royal Dutch Football Association) IJsselmeervogels
5	DF	Kymani Nedd	10 June 2004 (age 22)	19	0	(Royal Dutch Football Association) Zwaluwen Vlaardingen
6	DF	Rovien Ostiana	14 February 2002 (age 24)	20	8	(Royal Dutch Football Association) Zwaluwen Vlaardingen
2	DF	Nickenson Paul	24 August 1997 (age 29)	40	0	(Aruba Football Federation) Dakota
12	DF	Justin Peterson		0	0	(Royal Dutch Football Association) Telstar
8	MF	Walter Bennett	18 March 1997 (age 29)	31	4	(Aruba Football Federation) Sporting Ayo
20	MF	Justin Figaroa	22 March 2005 (age 21)	1	0	(United States Soccer Federation) Grand View Vikings
14	MF	Ezekiel Frans	22 November 2003 (age 22)	1	0	(Aruba Football Federation) Sporting Ayo
3	MF	Diederick Luydens	18 February 1999 (age 27)	17	2	(Aruba Football Federation) Dakota
10	MF	Jaybrien Romano	13 December 2004 (age 21)	11	3	(Royal Dutch Football Association) SteDoCo
9	FW	Carlito Fermina	6 January 2000 (age 26)	5	1	(Royal Spanish Football Federation) CD Manchego
19	FW	Javier Jiménez	27 May 2000 (age 26)	20	2	(German Football Association) Schwarz-Weiß Rehden
17	FW	Jayden Kruydenhof	18 December 2006 (age 19)	11	1	(Royal Dutch Football Association) AFC
16	FW	Alljereau Mercera	3 May 2002 (age 24)	3	0	(Royal Dutch Football Association) Rijnvogels
21	FW	Mishawn Molina	16 January 2005 (age 21)	5	2	(Gibraltar Football Association) Glacis United
7	FW	Gello Robertha	6 September 2004 (age 22)	4	1	(Royal Dutch Football Association) IJsselmeervogels

=== Recent call-ups ===
The following players have been called up by the national squad within the last twelve months..

Pos.	Player	Date of birth (age)	Caps	Goals	Club	Latest call-up
GK	Jahmani Eisden	9 July 2005 (age 21)	0	0	(Netherlands) Sportlust '46	v. Liechtenstein, 29 March 2026
DF	Darryl Bäly	19 January 1998 (age 28)	10	1	(Netherlands) AFC Ajax (amateurs)	v. Liechtenstein, 29 March 2026
MF	Ethan Tromp	17 January 2002 (age 24)	2	0	(Aruba) SV Britannia	v. Barbados, 15 November 2025
MF	Dimaggio Senchi	3 May 1995 (age 31)	9	0	(Netherlands) Alcmaria Victrix	v. Liechtenstein, 29 March 2026
MF	Conner van Kilsdonk	24 September 2006 (age 20)	5	1	(Netherlands) RKC Waalwijk	v. Liechtenstein, 29 March 2026
MF	Quinlan Poulina	20 February 2003 (age 23)	4	0	(Netherlands) Lisse	v. Liechtenstein, 29 March 2026
MF	Gianni Vandepitte	3 July 2000 (age 26)	2	0	(Netherlands) Kloetinge	v. Liechtenstein, 29 March 2026
FW	Terence Groothusen	16 September 1996 (age 30)	22	4	(Netherlands) ADO '20	v. Barbados, 15 November 2025
FW	Jahrdell Constancia	16 August 2000 (age 26)	0	0	(Netherlands) Goes	v. Barbados, 15 November 2025
FW	Arenchelo Leito	12 November 2002 (age 24)	1	0	(Netherlands) RKAV Volendam	v. Liechtenstein, 29 March 2026

== Player records ==
As of 28 May 2026
Players in bold are still active with Aruba.

=== Most appearances ===
Rank	Player	Caps	Goals	Career
1	**Nickenson Paul**	35	0	2014–present
2	Eric Abdul	28	0	2011–2023
3	**Walter Bennett**	25	2	2018–present
4	Theric Ruiz	24	1	2004–2016
5	Erik Santos de Gouveia	22	3	2011–2021
5	**Matthew Lentink**	22	0	2014–present
5	**Terence Groothusen**	22	4	2019–present
8	Francois Croes	21	0	2008–2021
9	Ronald Gómez	20	5	2002–2021
10	Leroy Oehlers	19	0	2013–2019

=== Top goalscorers ===
Rank	Player	Goals	Caps	Ratio	Career
1	**Rovien Ostiana**	8	17	0.47	2023–present
2	Glenroy Lake	5	6	0.83	1995–2002
2	Ronald Gómez	5	20	0.25	2002–2021
4	Wander Gross	4	5	0.8	2000–2001
4	Joshua John	4	8	0.5	2018–2023
4	Dwayn Alex Raven	4	8	0.5	2012–2015
4	Rensy Barradas	4	11	0.36	2011–2015
4	**Terence Groothusen**	4	22	0.25	2019–present
8	Lesley Felomina	3	4	0.75	2000–2001
8	**Jaybrien Romano**	3	9	0.33	2023–present
8	Maurice Escalona	3	10	0.3	2004–2014
8	Annuar Kock	3	14	0.21	2011–2019
8	Raymond Baten	3	16	0.19	2011–2019
8	Erik Santos de Gouveia	3	22	0.14	2011–2021

== Competitive record ==
=== FIFA World Cup ===
FIFA World Cup record										Qualification record					
Year	Round	Pos.	Pld	W	D	L	GF	GA	Squad	Pld	W	D	L	GF	GA
1930 to 1986	Part of Netherlands Antilles									Part of Netherlands Antilles					
1990 and 1994	Did not participate									Did not participate					
(France) 1998	Did not qualify									2	0	0	2	3	6
(South Korea) (Japan) 2002	Did not qualify									4	1	1	2	7	11
(Germany) 2006	Did not qualify									2	0	0	2	2	10
(South Africa) 2010	Did not qualify									2	0	0	2	0	4
(Brazil) 2014	Did not qualify									2	1	0	1	6	6
(Russia) 2018	Did not qualify									4	2	0	2	5	5
(Qatar) 2022	Did not qualify									4	1	0	3	3	19
(Canada) (Mexico) (United States) 2026	Did not qualify									4	0	2	2	3	10
(Morocco) (Portugal) (Spain) 2030	To be determined									To be determined					
(Saudi Arabia) 2034	To be determined									To be determined					
Total	—	0/8	—							24	5	3	16	29	71

=== CONCACAF Gold Cup ===
CONCACAF Championship / Gold Cup record										Qualification record					
Year	Round	Pos.	Pld	W	D	L	GF	GA	Squad	Pld	W	D	L	GF	GA
1963 to 1985	Part of Netherlands Antilles									Part of Netherlands Antilles					
1989 and 1991	Did not participate									Did not participate					
(Mexico) (United States) 1993	Withdrew									Withdrew					
(United States) 1996	Did not qualify									2	0	0	2	5	7
(United States) 1998	Did not qualify									2	1	0	1	2	7
(United States) 2000	Did not qualify									3	1	1	1	4	4
(United States) 2002	Did not qualify									3	0	0	3	4	14
(Mexico) (United States) 2003	Did not qualify									2	0	0	2	0	8
(United States) 2005	Withdrew									Withdrew					
(United States) 2007	Did not participate									Did not participate					
(United States) 2009	Did not qualify									2	0	1	1	1	3
(United States) 2011	Did not participate									Did not participate					
(United States) 2013	Did not qualify									3	0	1	2	5	7
(Canada) (United States) 2015	Did not qualify									3	2	0	1	8	2
(United States) 2017	Did not qualify									2	0	0	2	1	4
(Costa Rica) (Jamaica) (United States) 2019	Did not qualify									4	1	1	2	5	6
(United States) 2021	Did not qualify									6	0	0	6	5	18
(Canada) (United States) 2023	Did not qualify									4	1	1	2	5	5
(Canada) (United States) 2025	Did not qualify									6	0	0	6	5	17
Total	—	0/13	—							40	6	5	29	43	102

=== CONCACAF Nations League ===
CONCACAF Nations League record
League phase											Final phase									
Season	League	Group	Pos.	Pld	W	D	L	GF	GA	P/R	Finals	Round	Pos.	Pld	W	D	L	GF	GA	Squad
2019−20	B	C	16th	6	0	0	6	5	18	▼	(United States) 2021	Ineligible								
2022–23	C	B	6th	4	1	1	2	5	5	Same position	(United States) 2023	Ineligible								
2023–24	C	B	2nd	4	4	0	0	14	4	▲	(United States) 2024	Ineligible								
2024–25	B	C	16th	6	0	0	6	5	17	▼	(United States) 2025	Ineligible								
2026–27	C	B	4th	4	3	0	1	8	5	▲	2027 (Note: Since the 2026–27 CONCACAF Nations League, a final phase has been held for each league.)	TBD								
Total				24	8	1	15	37	49	—	Total	—								

CONCACAF Nations League history
First match	Guyana 1–0 Aruba (6 September 2019; Willemstad, Curaçao)
Biggest Win	Aruba 3–0 Saint Martin (6 June 2022; Willemstad, Curaçao); Aruba 4–1 U.S. Virgin Islands (16 November 2023; Christiansted, U.S. Virgin Islands)
Biggest Defeat	Jamaica 6–0 Aruba (15 October 2019; Willemstad, Curaçao)
Best Result	League C (2023–24)
Worst Result	League B (2019–20, 2024–25); League C (2022–23)

=== Caribbean Cup ===
CFU Championship / Caribbean Cup record									Qualification record					
Year	Round	Pos.	Pld	W	D	L	GF	GA	Pld	W	D	L	GF	GA
1978 to 1985	Part of Netherlands Antilles								Part of Netherlands Antilles					
1988	Did not participate								Did not participate					
(Barbados) 1989	Did not qualify								4	0	1	3	1	19
(Trinidad and Tobago) 1990	Did not qualify								2	0	1	1	3	4
(Jamaica) 1991	Did not participate								Did not participate					
(Trinidad and Tobago) 1992	Did not qualify								3	0	0	3	0	10
1993 and 1994	Did not participate								Did not participate					
(Cayman Islands) (Jamaica) 1995	Did not qualify								2	0	0	2	5	7
(Trinidad and Tobago) 1996	Did not participate								Did not participate					
(Antigua and Barbuda) (Saint Kitts and Nevis) 1997	Did not qualify								2	1	0	1	2	7
(Jamaica) (Trinidad and Tobago) 1998	Did not qualify								3	1	1	1	4	4
(Trinidad and Tobago) 1999	Withdrew								Withdrew					
(Trinidad and Tobago) 2001	Did not qualify								3	0	0	3	4	14
(Barbados) 2005	Withdrew								Withdrew					
(Trinidad and Tobago) 2007	Did not participate								Did not participate					
(Jamaica) 2008	Did not qualify								2	0	1	1	1	3
(Martinique) 2010	Did not participate								Did not participate					
(Antigua and Barbuda) 2012	Did not qualify								3	0	1	2	5	7
(Jamaica) 2014	Did not qualify								3	2	0	1	8	2
(Martinique) 2017	Did not qualify								2	0	0	2	1	4
Total	—	0/11	—						29	4	5	20	34	83

=== CCCF Championship ===
CCCF Championship record
Year	Round	Pos.	Pld	W	D	L	GF	GA	Squad
(Honduras) 1955	Round-robin	5th	6	2	1	3	9	9	Squad
Total	Fifth place	1/1	6	2	1	3	9	9	—

=== ABCS Tournament ===
ABCS Tournament record
Year	Round	Pos.	Pld	W	D	L	GF	GA
(Curaçao) 2010	Third place	3rd	2	0	1	1	3	6
(Suriname) 2011	Runners-up	2nd	2	0	2	0	2	2
(Aruba) 2012	Champions	1st	2	2	0	0	4	2
(Curaçao) 2013	Fourth place	4th	2	0	0	2	1	4
(Suriname) 2015	Runners-up	2nd	2	0	1	1	0	1
(Curaçao) 2021	Third place	3rd	2	0	1	1	3	9
(Curaçao) 2022	Third place	3rd	2	1	1	0	3	2
Total	1 Title	7/7	14	3	6	5	16	26

== Head-to-head record ==
Note: teams that are in italics indicates that the team is a historical team of a polity not existing anymore, or a team which is not a FIFA member.

As of 16 November 2026

These all-time records are exclusively class 'A' internationals matches.

Against	Played	Won	Drawn	Lost	GF	GA	GD	Confederation
Anguilla	2	2	0	0	5	2	+3	CONCACAF
Antigua and Barbuda	8	2	1	5	6	11	−5	CONCACAF
Barbados	8	2	1	5	11	17	−6	CONCACAF
Bermuda	2	1	0	1	3	6	–3	CONCACAF
British Virgin Islands	1	1	0	0	7	0	+7	CONCACAF
Cambodia	1	1	0	0	2	1	+1	AFC
Canada	1	0	0	1	0	7	–7	CONCACAF
Cayman Islands	3	3	0	0	10	3	+7	CONCACAF
Costa Rica	2	0	1	1	3	4	−1	CONCACAF
Cuba	1	1	0	0	4	1	+3	CONCACAF
Curaçao	29	1	9	17	22	57	−35	CONCACAF
Dominica	1	0	0	1	2	3	−1	CONCACAF
Dominican Republic	4	0	1	3	5	10	−5	CONCACAF
El Salvador	1	0	0	1	0	2	−2	CONCACAF
French Guiana	3	1	0	2	1	4	−3	CONCACAF
Grenada	2	0	0	2	3	7	−4	CONCACAF
Guadeloupe	1	0	1	0	0	0	0	CONCACAF
Guam	2	1	1	0	4	2	+2	AFC
Guatemala	1	0	1	0	0	0	0	CONCACAF
Guyana	4	0	0	4	2	12	−10	CONCACAF
Haiti	4	0	1	3	5	14	–9	CONCACAF
Honduras	1	0	1	0	1	1	0	CONCACAF
Jamaica	3	0	0	3	0	14	−14	CONCACAF
Liechtenstein	1	1	0	0	4	1	+3	UEFA
Macau	1	1	0	0	4	1	+3	AFC
Martinique	2	0	2	0	1	1	0	CONCACAF
Montserrat	1	0	0	1	0	2	−2	CONCACAF
Netherlands Antilles	8	1	1	6	9	20	−11	CONCACAF
Panama	1	0	1	0	0	0	0	CONCACAF
Puerto Rico	4	1	1	2	7	10	–3	CONCACAF
Saint Kitts and Nevis	3	0	0	3	2	7	−5	CONCACAF
Saint Lucia	4	1	1	2	10	11	−1	CONCACAF
Saint Martin	2	1	1	0	3	0	+3	CONCACAF
Saint Vincent and the Grenadines	2	1	0	1	2	3	−1	CONCACAF
Sint Maarten	2	0	0	2	0	3	−3	CONCACAF
Suriname	13	1	2	10	6	46	−40	CONCACAF
Trinidad and Tobago	1	0	0	1	0	11	−11	CONCACAF
Turks and Caicos Islands	1	1	0	0	1	0	+1	CONCACAF
U.S. Virgin Islands	2	2	0	0	7	2	+5	CONCACAF
Venezuela	2	0	0	2	1	6	−5	CONMEBOL
Total	120	23	27	75	146	281	−134	FIFA

== Honours ==
=== Friendly / Unofficial ===
- ABCS Tournament (1): 2012
- FIFA Series (1): 2026 Rwanda B
