= North Sound =

Settlement in Antigua and Barbuda

Coordinates: 17.115547759623155°N 61.79630966743006°W

North Sound is a settlement, former plantation, and former division in Antigua and Barbuda.

In 1725, the Division of North Sound was split into the Division of Old North Sound, and the Division of New North Sound, which became the Parish of Saint George.

The Sir Vivian Richards Stadium is a Test cricket venue located on the outskirts of the city. The stadium is occasionally described as the "North Sound stadium". Upon completion in 2006 it replaced the Antigua Recreation Ground as the main cricket venue on the island.

== History ==
=== Plantation ownership history ===
- 1700 William Thomas (d.1718)
- 1718 Hon. Geo. Thomas (d.1774)
- 1736 Dr. Walter Tullideph (1736–1754)
- 1777 Sir George Thomas (1748–1815)
- 1780 William G. Thomas
- 1829 Sir Geo. Thomas, Bart (662 acres – 295 slaves)
- 1852 Sir Geo. Thomas, Bart. (602 acres)
- 1860 George Estridge
- 1870 Ms. Estridge
- 1883 Heirs of Shand
- 1891 George Estridge 1872
- 1921 T DuBuisson & GM & AM Moody-Stuart
- 1933 Camacho map
- 1943 Antigua Syndicate Estates Ltd. - 400 acres estate
- 1968 Government of Antigua and Barbuda – Crown Land
