= Trinidad Stadium =

Sports venue in Oranjestad, Aruba

Coordinates: 12°30′47″N 70°1′25″W

Guillermo Prospero Trinidad Stadium
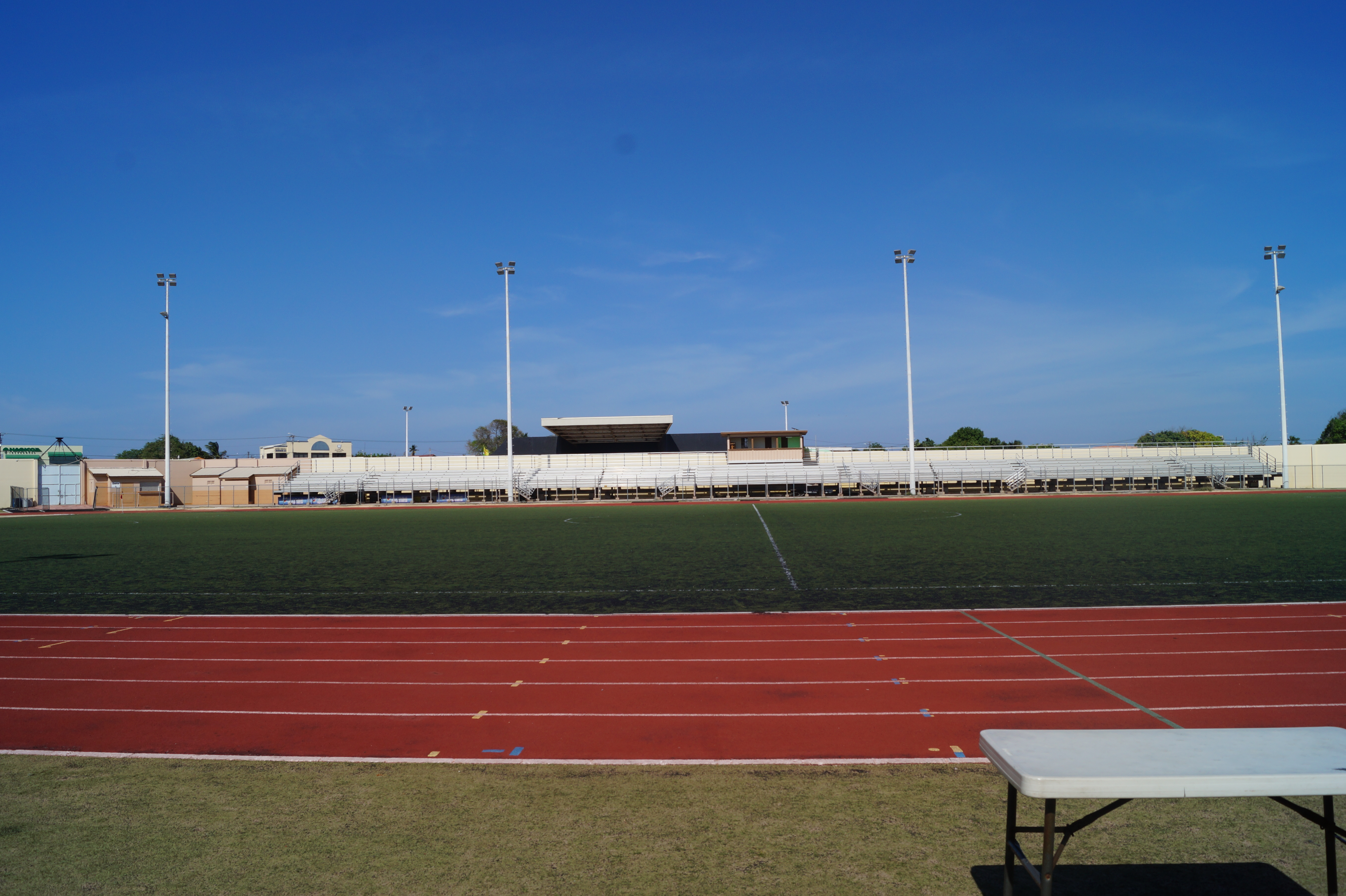
- Interactive map of Guillermo Prospero Trinidad Stadium
- Location: Oranjestad, Aruba
- Capacity: 2,500
- Surface: AstroTurf
- Field size: 105 m × 68 m

Construction
- Opened: 12 April 1952; 74 years ago

Tenants
- Aruba national football team

Guillermo Prospero Trinidad Stadium (officially known as Estadio Guillermo Próspero Trinidad which is part of the Compleho Deportivo Guillermo Prospero Trinidad), is a multi-purpose stadium in Oranjestad, Aruba. It is Aruba's national football stadium, named after Guillermo Trinidad, a politician from the same neighbourhood (Dakota).

== History ==
=== Opening stadium ===
The Wilhelminastadion was opened on Saturday 12 April 1952, and named after Queen Wilhelmina of the Netherlands, who abdicated four years before the opening. The new stadium had 1200 seats, the rest of the spectators had to stand. The festivities included a parade, a demonstration of calisthenics by 800 school children, and a football match between Bubali and Jong Santa Cruz. Jani Brokke, Dutch Antilles football player at the 1952 Summer Olympics, took the athlete's oath.

=== Renovations ===
The first renovation was completed in 1994, along with a small expansion. The complex was reopened and renamed after the neighbourhood Dakota's local politician Guillermo Prospero Trinidad. In 2005 and 2006 some work was done on the grass and running track. The stadium had not been maintained for years when in 2018 the FIFA declared the stadium unfit for international footballgames.

In July 2021 a renovation was announced and the Aruban parliament accorded an initial budget of 1.5 million florin. Part I of the renovation would be renewal of the artificial grass, locker rooms and stands. Part II would renew the lighting and the running track. The works should be ready in March 2022. FIFA offered assistance and a financial contribution if the stadium was upgraded to their international standards.

In March of 2023 the renovation works were started. The works should take 8 months and include a new roof, artificial grass pitch, LED-lighting and a new score system. The Aruban government's budget was up to 3.5 Million Florin. A few months in the renovation, FIFA visited the build and concluded that their standards would be met and the works were on schedule. The A.V.B. received their contribution.

== Activities ==
The stadium has a capacity of approximately 2,500 spectators. It hosts football matches and also track and field competitions. It also is used to hold concerts, carnaval and other festivities. Sinbad performed his HBO comedy special "Nothin' but the Funk" here in 1997.

The stadium housed the Aruban Olympic Committee (COA) until the organisation outgrew their quarters. In 2023 they moved to a new headquarters at the Vondellaan.

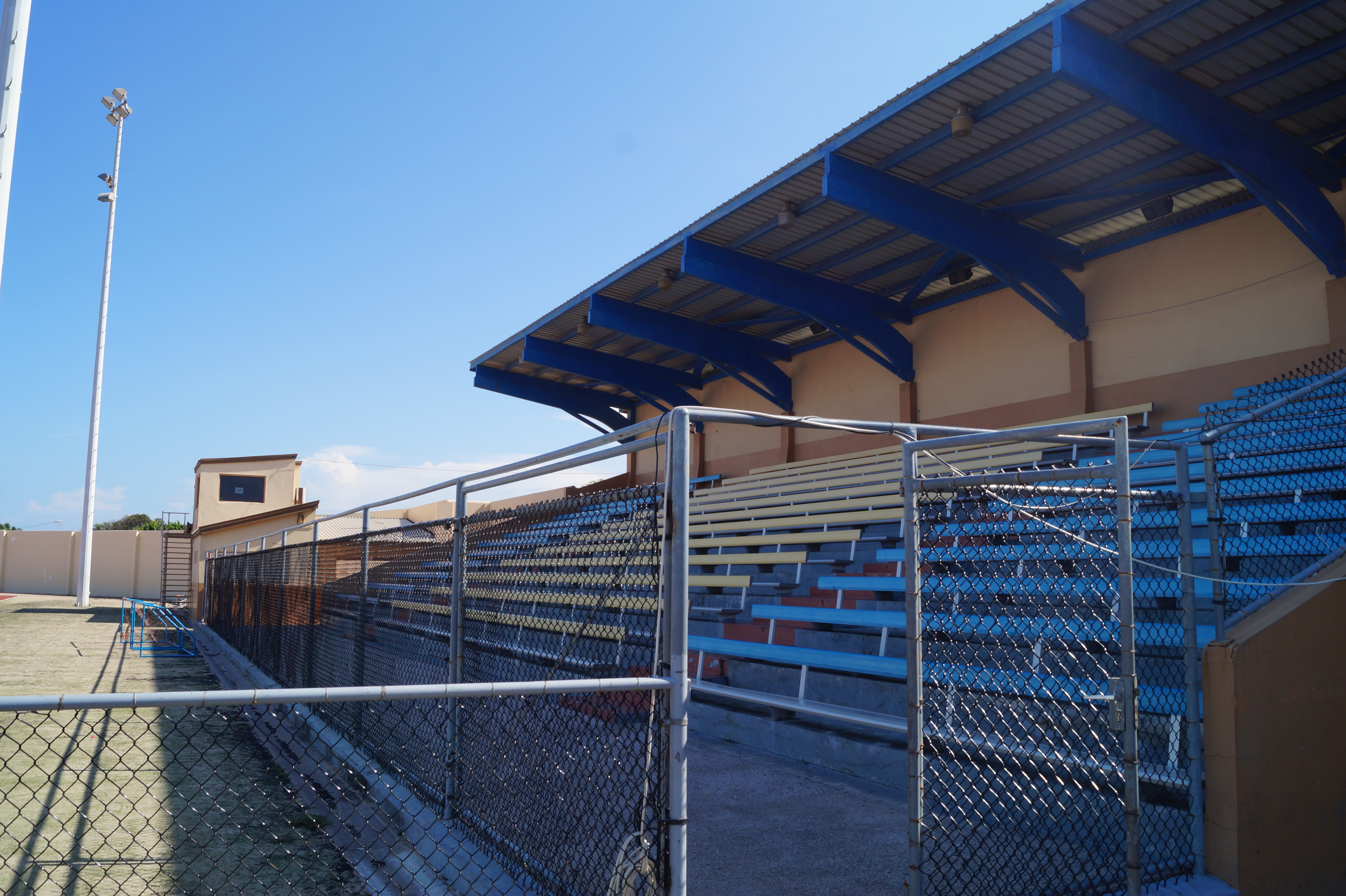
Stands

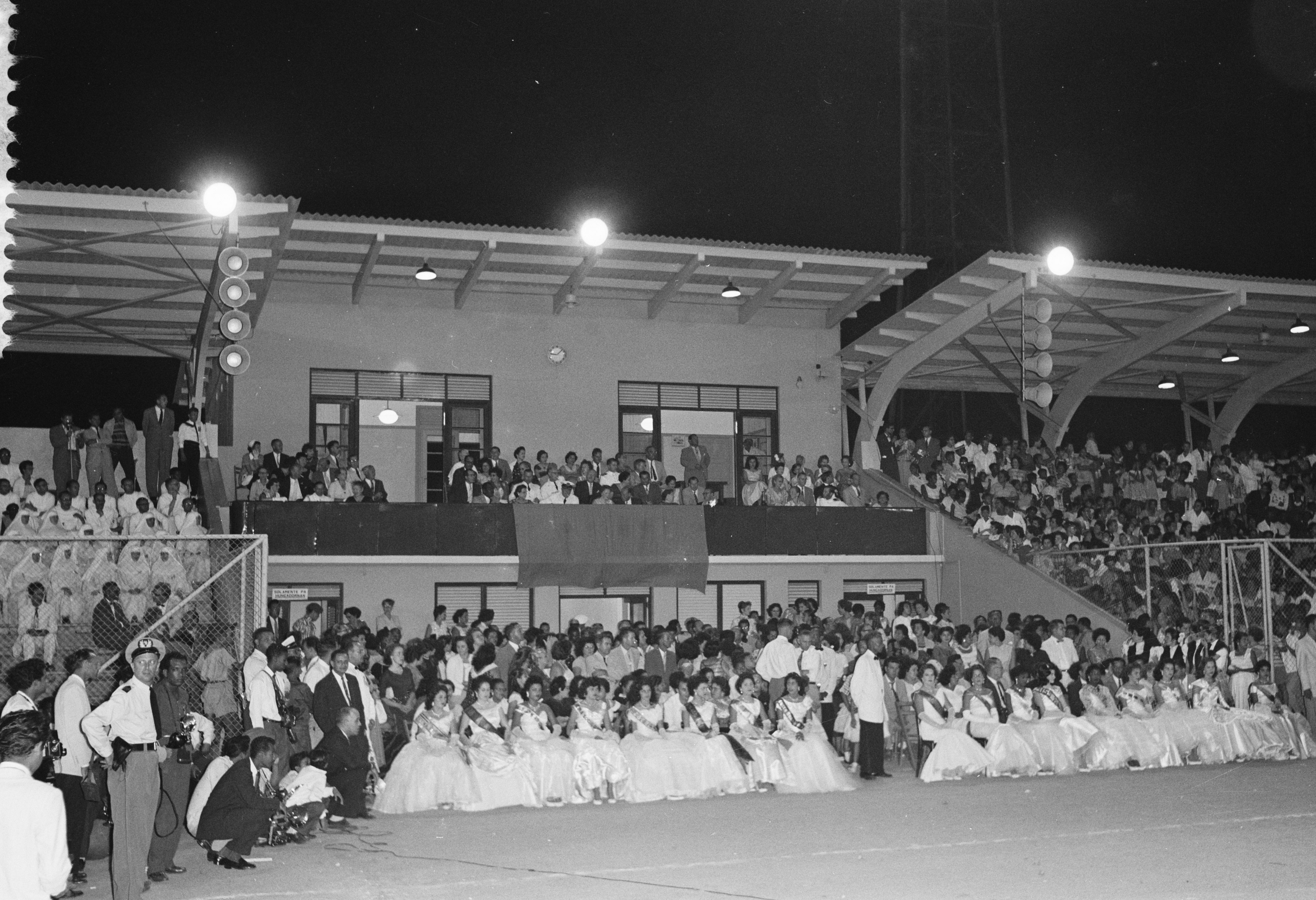
Queen of Carnaval 1958, in attendance of princess Beatrix

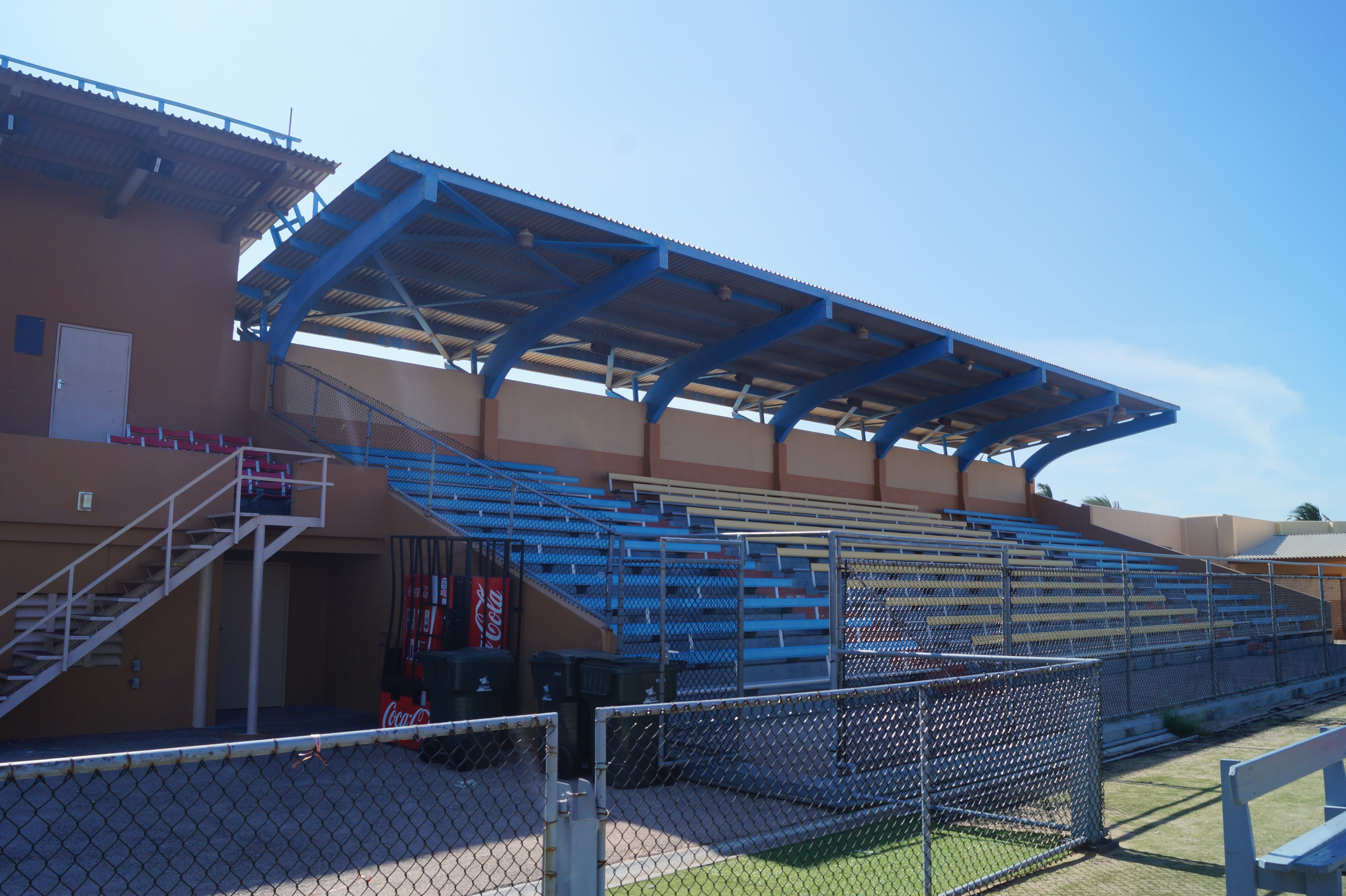
Stands
