= Cayman Islands national football team results =

This is a list of the Cayman Islands national football team results.

== Exhibition matches ==
7 October 2008 Friendly	Cayman Islands	2–0	Stultz Academy	Miami, United States
	Brown 15'; Douglas 30'			Stadium: Cypress Sports Ground

== 1990s ==
=== 1990 ===
24 March 1990 Caribbean Cup	Sint Maarten	1–1	Cayman Islands

28 March 1990 Caribbean Cup	Cayman Islands	2–1	Aruba

30 March 1990 Caribbean Cup	Saint Martin	1–5	Cayman Islands

1 April 1990 Caribbean Cup	Saint Martin	2–3	Cayman Islands

=== 1991 ===
10 May 1991 Caribbean Cup	Cayman Islands	2–1	British Virgin Islands

12 May 1991 Caribbean Cup	Saint Kitts and Nevis	1–1	Cayman Islands

26 May 1991 Caribbean Cup	Jamaica	3–2	Cayman Islands
	Davis 2' 47'; Long 89'		Ramoon 38'; Parchement 80'

28 May 1991 Caribbean Cup	Guyana	2–1	Cayman Islands
	Massiah 29', 89'		Williams 30'

=== 1992 ===
1992 Caribbean Cup	Martinique	7–0	Cayman Islands

1992 Caribbean Cup	Sint Maarten	4–2	Cayman Islands

=== 1993 ===
11 March 1993 Caribbean Cup	Guyana	3–2	Cayman Islands
	Cadogan; Stanton		Ramoon

12 March 1993 Caribbean Cup	Barbados	6–1	Cayman Islands
	Thorne; White

14 March 1993 Caribbean Cup	Puerto Rico	4–0	Cayman Islands
	Conlon; Lugris

=== 1996 ===
12 May 1998 World Cup qualification	Cayman Islands	0–1	Cuba	George Town, Cayman Islands
		Report	Lázaro Darcourt 10'	Stadium: Truman Bodden; Attendance: 2,000; Referee: Argelio Sabillon (Honduras)

14 May 1998 World Cup qualification	Cuba	5–0	Cayman Islands	George Town, Cayman Islands
		Report	Alexander Cruzata 19'; Eduardo Sebrango 63'; Lázaro Darcourt 68', 81'; Lester Moré 83'	Stadium: Truman Bodden; Attendance: 1,200; Referee: Pascual Rebolledo Cárdenas (Mexico)

== 2000s ==
=== 2000 ===
5 March 2002 World Cup qualification	Cuba	4–0	Cayman Islands	Havana
	Marten 38'; Álvarez 56'; Prado 87'; Gandara 90'	Report		Stadium: Estadio Pedro Marrero; Attendance: 11,000; Referee: Argelio Sabillon Hughil Thompson (Jamaica)

19 March 2002 World Cup qualification	Cayman Islands	0–0	Cuba	George Town, Cayman Islands
		Report		Stadium: Truman Bodden; Attendance: 5,000; Referee: Ibrahim Brohim (Dominica)

=== 2004 ===
3 February 2006 World Cup qualification	Cayman Islands	1–2	Cuba	George Town, Cayman Islands
	Elliot 72'	Report	Moré 53' Marten 89'	Stadium: Truman Bodden Stadium; Attendance: 1,789; Referee: Rodolfo Sibrian (El Salvador)

27 March 2006 World Cup qualification	Cuba	3–0	Cayman Islands	Havana, Cuba
	Moré 7', 50', 66'	Report		Stadium: Estadio Pedro Marrero; Attendance: 3,500; Referee: Marco Rodriguez (Mexico)

=== 2008 ===
3 February 2010 World Cup qualification	Bermuda	1–1	Cayman Islands	Hamilton, Bermuda
	Burgess 18'	Report	Grant 87'	Stadium: Bermuda National Stadium; Attendance: 2,000; Referee: Mauricio Navarro (Canada)

30 March 2010 World Cup qualification	Cayman Islands	1–3	Bermuda	George Town, Cayman Islands
	Forbes 64' (pen.)	Report	DeGraff 19', 23'; Steede 53'	Stadium: Truman Bodden Stadium; Attendance: 3,200; Referee: Jair Marrufo (United States)

27 August 2008 Caribbean Cup qualification	Cayman Islands	3–0	Saint Martin	George Town, Cayman Islands
	Jefford 58'; Sanchez 68'; Hill 90'	Report		Stadium: Truman Bodden Stadium; Attendance: 300; Referee: Kevin Thomas (Jamaica)

30 August 2008 Caribbean Cup qualification	Cayman Islands	1–1	Antigua and Barbuda	George Town, Cayman Islands
	Taylor 67'	Report	Christian 33'	Stadium: Truman Bodden Stadium; Attendance: 350; Referee: Jeoffrey Hospadalis (Trinidad and Tobago)

31 August 2008 Caribbean Cup qualification	Cayman Islands	0–0	Bermuda	George Town, Cayman Islands
		Report		Stadium: Truman Bodden Stadium; Attendance: 350; Referee: Geoffrey Hospedales (Trinidad and Tobago)

7 October Friendly	Cayman Islands	1–0	Haiti	Miami, United States
	Whittaker 6'			Stadium: Cypress Sports Ground

11 October 2008 Caribbean Cup qualification	Guadeloupe	7–1	Cayman Islands	Les Abymes, Guadeloupe
	Antoine-Curier 5', 43', 57'; Gotin 34'; Hanany 67', 78'; Gendrey 75'	Report	Jefford 86'	Stadium: Stade René Serge Nabajoth; Attendance: 4,200; Referee: Roy McArthur (Grenada)

13 October 2008 Caribbean Cup qualification	Cayman Islands	0–1	Martinique	Les Abymes, Guadeloupe
		Report	Sabin 32'	Stadium: Stade René Serge Nabajoth; Attendance: 1,000; Referee: James Matthew (Saint Kitts and Nevis)

15 October 2008 Caribbean Cup qualification	Grenada	4–2	Cayman Islands	Les Abymes, Guadeloupe
	Bain 42'; Rennie 45', 79'; Charles 67'	Report	Brown-Morfy 31', 82'	Stadium: Stade René Serge Nabajoth; Attendance: 3,358; Referee: Bryan Willett (Antigua and Barbuda)

5 November Friendly	Cayman Islands	1–6	Jamaica	George Town, Cayman Islands
	Gonzalez (?)		Hue 9'; Anderson 11'; Cousins 22', 63'; Breakenridge 75'; Blackburn 78'	Stadium: Truman Bodden Stadium

9 November Friendly	Cayman Islands	0–2	Jamaica	George Town, Cayman Islands
			Cummings 42'; Dean 58'	Stadium: Truman Bodden Stadium

== 2010s ==
=== 2011 ===
2 September 2014 World Cup qualification	Suriname	1–0	Cayman Islands	Paramaribo
	Mando 11' (pen.)	Report		Stadium: André Kamperveen Stadion; Attendance: 1,000; Referee: Adrian Skeete (Barbados)

6 September 2014 World Cup qualification	Cayman Islands	1–4	El Salvador	George Town
	M. Ebanks 73' (pen.)	Report	Bautista 49'; Anaya 62', 80'; García 90+3'	Stadium: Truman Bodden Stadium; Attendance: 2,200; Referee: Elmar Rodas (Guatemala)

7 October 2014 World Cup qualification	Cayman Islands	0–1	Suriname	George Town
		Report	Drenthe 57'	Stadium: Truman Bodden Stadium; Attendance: 2,100; Referee: Edvin Jurisevic (United States)

11 October 2014 World Cup qualification	El Salvador	4–0	Cayman Islands	San Salvador
	Turcios 6'; Purdy 13'; J. Alas 45'; Sosa 88' (pen.)	Report		Stadium: Estadio Cuscatlán; Attendance: 17,570; Referee: Hugo Cruz (Costa Rica)

11 November 2014 World Cup qualification	Dominican Republic	4–0	Cayman Islands	San Cristóbal
	Navarro 17'; Ozuna 38'; Rodríguez 64'; Morillo 79'	Report		Stadium: Estadio Panamericano; Attendance: 1,000; Referee: José Guerrero (Nicaragua)

14 November 2014 World Cup qualification	Cayman Islands	1–1	Dominican Republic	George Town
	M. Ebanks 72'	Report	García 41'	Stadium: Truman Bodden Stadium; Attendance: 1,750; Referee: James Matthew (Saint Kitts and Nevis)

=== 2015 ===
25 March 2018 World Cup qualification	Belize	0–0	Cayman Islands	Belmopan
				Stadium: FFB Stadium; Attendance: 1,924; Referee: Oscar Reyna (Guatemala)

29 March 2018 World Cup qualification	Cayman Islands	1–1	Belize	George Town
	M. Ebanks 5'	Report	Kuylen 20'	Stadium: Truman Bodden Sports Complex; Attendance: 1,800; Referee: Yadel Martínez (Cuba)

=== 2019 ===
5 September 2019-20 CONCACAF Nations League	U.S. Virgin Islands	0–2	Cayman Islands	Upper Bethlehem
		Report	Martin 60', 90+5'	Stadium: Bethlehem Soccer Stadium; Referee: Tristley Bassue (Saint Kitts and Nevis)

8 September 2019-20 CONCACAF Nations League	Cayman Islands	3–2	Barbados	George Town
	Martin 5'; Ebanks 70'; Bellafonte 75'	Report	Hill 14'; Jules 74'	Stadium: Truman Bodden Sports Complex; Referee: Luis Enrique Santander (Mexico)

12 October 2019-20 CONCACAF Nations League	Saint Martin	3–0	Cayman Islands	The Valley
	Bellechasse 64', 71', 75'	Report		Stadium: Raymond E. Guishard Technical Centre; Referee: Oshane Nation (Jamaica)

15 October 2019-20 CONCACAF Nations League	Cayman Islands	1–0	Saint Martin	George Town
	Ebanks 75'	Report		Stadium: Truman Bodden Sports Complex; Referee: Fernando Hernández (Mexico)

16 November 2019-20 CONCACAF Nations League	Cayman Islands	1–0	U.S. Virgin Islands	George Town
	Hyde 17'	Report		Stadium: Truman Bodden Sports Complex; Referee: José Kellys (Panama)

19 November 2019-20 CONCACAF Nations League	Barbados	3–0	Cayman Islands	Bridgetown
	Hope 32', 90'	Report		Stadium: Wildey Turf; Referee: Kimbell Ward (Saint Kitts and Nevis)

== 2020s ==
=== 2021 ===
24 March 2022 World Cup qualification	Suriname	3–0	Cayman Islands	Paramaribo, Suriname
19:00 UTC−3	Pinas 22'; Donk 38' (pen.); G. Vlijter 76'	Report		Stadium: Dr. Ir. Franklin Essed Stadion; Referee: Jorge Pérez (Mexico)

29 March 2022 World Cup qualification	Cayman Islands	0–11	Canada	Bradenton, United States
18:00 UTC−4		Report	Sturing 6'; Larin 13'; Wotherspoon 25'; Davies 27' (pen.), 73'; Kaye 32', 63'; Johnston 44'; Cavallini 68', 74', 76'	Stadium: IMG Academy; Referee: Ted Unkel (United States)

2 June 2022 World Cup qualification	Cayman Islands	1–3	Aruba	Bradenton, United States
18:00 UTC−4	Ebanks 30' (pen.)	Report	John 40', 75'; Groothusen 45+2'	Stadium: IMG Academy; Referee: Luis Enrique Santander (Mexico)

8 June 2022 World Cup qualification	Bermuda	1–1	Cayman Islands	Bradenton, United States
20:00 UTC−4	Hall 65'	Report	M. Ebanks 23'	Stadium: IMG Academy; Referee: Rubiel Vazquez (United States)

=== 2022 ===
3 June 2022–23 Nations League	British Virgin Islands	1–1	Cayman Islands	Road Town, British Virgin Islands
16:00 UTC−4	Caesar 63'	Report	Conolly 82'	Stadium: A. O. Shirley Recreation Ground; Referee: Nima Saghafi (United States)

6 June 2022–23 Nations League	Cayman Islands	1–1	British Virgin Islands	George Town, Cayman Islands
18:00 UTC−5	J. Ebanks 25' (pen.)	Report	Wilson 46'	Stadium: Truman Bodden Sports Complex; Referee: Rubiel Vazquez (United States)

9 June 2022–23 Nations League	Cayman Islands	0–3	Puerto Rico	George Town, Cayman Islands
18:00 UTC−5		Report	Angking 23', 64' (pen.); Valentin 84'	Stadium: Truman Bodden Sports Complex; Referee: Sergio Reyna (Guatemala)

=== 2023 ===
26 March 2022–23 Nations League	Puerto Rico	5–1	Cayman Islands	Bayamón, Puerto Rico
18:00 UTC−4	Rivera 2', 70'; Díaz 40'; Burgos 89', 90+2'	Report	Studenhofft 85'	Stadium: Estadio Juan Ramón Loubriel; Referee: Ekaterina Koroleva (United States)

7 September 2023–24 Nations League	U.S. Virgin Islands	2–2	Cayman Islands	Saint Croix, U.S. Virgin Islands
19:00 UTC−4	McLaughlin 23' (o.g.); St. Louis 42'	Report	Jo. Ebanks 16'; Gray 47'	Stadium: Bethlehem Soccer Stadium; Referee: Reon Radix (Grenada)

11 September 2023–24 Nations League	Cayman Islands	1–2	Aruba	George Town, Cayman Islands
15:30 UTC−5	Reeves 6'	Report	Ostiana 2'; Bäly 79'	Stadium: Truman Bodden Sports Complex; Referee: Ismael Cornejo (El Salvador)

17 October 2023–24 Nations League	Cayman Islands	2–1	U.S. Virgin Islands	George Town, Cayman Islands
15:30 UTC−5	Seymour 17'; Reeves 57'	Report	Joseph 84'	Stadium: Truman Bodden Sports Complex; Referee: Randy Encarnación (Dominican Republic)

20 November 2023–24 Nations League	Aruba	5–1	Cayman Islands	Oranjestad, Aruba
15:00 UTC−4	Groothusen 16', 89'; Ostiana 45+5'; Maria 55'; Dania 77'	Report	Studenhofft 49'	Stadium: Trinidad Stadium; Referee: Norberto da Silva (Curaçao)

=== 2024 ===
26 March Friendly	Cayman Islands	0–4	Moldova	Antalya, Turkey
17:00 UTC+3		Report		Stadium: Mardan Sports Complex

8 June 2026 FIFA World Cup qualification	Cayman Islands	1–0	Antigua and Barbuda	George Town, Cayman Islands
21:00 UTC−5	Campbell 90+1'	Report (FIFA); Report (CONCACAF)		Stadium: Truman Bodden Sports Complex; Attendance: 453; Referee: Pierre-Luc Lauzière (Canada)

11 June 2026 FIFA World Cup qualification	Cuba	3–0; Awarded (Note: Cuba were awarded a 3–0 victory by forfeit, due to the Cayman Islands team not wanting visa issues to the United States as a result of visiting Cuba.)	Cayman Islands	Santiago de Cuba, Cuba
15:30 UTC−4		Report (FIFA); Report (CONCACAF)		Stadium: Estadio Antonio Maceo

4 September 2024–25 Nations League	British Virgin Islands	0–1	Cayman Islands	George Town, Cayman Islands
16:30 (15:30 UTC−5)		Report	Seymour 84'	Referee: Jonathan Leiton (Costa Rica)

7 September 2024–25 Nations League	Cayman Islands	1–4	Saint Kitts and Nevis	George Town, Cayman Islands
16:30 (15:30 UTC−5)	Duval 51'	Report	Rogers 10'; Williams 19', 37'; Stephen 72'	Referee: Moeth Gaymes (Saint Vincent and the Grenadines)

12 October 2024–25 Nations League	Cayman Islands	1–0	British Virgin Islands	Basseterre, Saint Kitts and Nevis
15:30	Douglas 69'	Report		Attendance: 100; Referee: Ricangel De Leça (Aruba)

15 October 2024–25 Nations League	Saint Kitts and Nevis	1–1	Cayman Islands	Basseterre, Saint Kitts and Nevis
15:30	Campbell 90+9' (o.g.)	Report	Scott 61'	Referee: Shekiel Jokil (Suriname)

15 November 2024–25 Nations League	Cayman Islands	0–6	Guadeloupe	George Town, Cayman Islands
15:00		Report	Mirval 12'; Leborgne 37'; Plumain 41'; Tille 64'; Mixtur 71'; Owens 90' (o.g.)	Attendance: 194; Referee: Adonai Escobedo (Mexico)

19 November 2024–25 Nations League	Guadeloupe	1–0	Cayman Islands	Le Gosier, Guadeloupe
17:00 (18:00 UTC−4)	Tille 88'	Report		Referee: Ismael Cornejo (El Salvador)

=== 2025 ===
4 June 2026 FIFA World Cup qualification	Bermuda	5–0	Cayman Islands	Devonshire Parish, Bermuda
20:00 UTC−3	Lewis 12' (pen.); Parfitt 54'; Hall 64'; Lambe 79'; Carpenter 84'	Report		Stadium: Bermuda National Stadium; Referee: Rubiel Vazquez (United States)

7 June 2026 FIFA World Cup qualification	Cayman Islands	0–1	Honduras	George Town, Cayman Islands
15:00 UTC−5		Report	Robinson 86' (o.g.)	Stadium: Truman Bodden Sports Complex; Referee: Adonis Carrasco (Dominican Republic)

12 November 2025–26 CONCACAF Series	Cayman Islands	1–2	British Virgin Islands	George Town, Cayman Islands
19:00 UTC−5	Seymour 38'	Report	Bonilla 62' (o.g.); Splatt 81' (pen.)	Stadium: Truman Bodden Sports Complex; Referee: Kimbell Ward (Saint Kitts and Nevis)

15 November 2025–26 CONCACAF Series	Cayman Islands	4–0	Anguilla	George Town, Cayman Islands
19:00 UTC−5	Studenhofft 16' (pen.), 58'; Scott 28'; O. Ebanks 84'	Report		Stadium: Truman Bodden Sports Complex; Referee: Amaury Majors (Bermuda)

=== 2026 ===
26 March 2025–26 CONCACAF Series	Cayman Islands	1–1	British Virgin Islands	George Town, Cayman Islands
19:00 UTC−5	Silburn 7'	Report	Splatt 20'	Stadium: Truman Bodden Sports Complex; Referee: Alexi Perry (Jamaica)

29 March 2025–26 CONCACAF Series	Cayman Islands	1–0	Bahamas	George Town, Cayman Islands
19:00 UTC−5	Kelly 59' (o.g.)	Report		Stadium: Truman Bodden Sports Complex; Referee: Tristley Bassue (St. Kitts and Nevis)

6 June 2026 Friendly	Gibraltar	4–1	Cayman Islands	Europa Point, Gibraltar
19:00 UTC+1	J. Scanlon 12'; Borge 49'; Valarino 57'; De Barr 59'	Report (UEFA); Report (FIFA)	Reeves 1'	Stadium: Europa Point Stadium; Referee: Antoine Chiaramonti (Andorra)
