= 2001 Caribbean Cup =

Copa Caribe 2001

Tournament details
- Host country: Trinidad and Tobago
- Teams: 24 (from 1 confederation)

Final positions
- Champions: Trinidad and Tobago (8th title)
- Runners-up: Haiti
- Third place: Martinique
- Fourth place: Cuba

Tournament statistics
- Matches played: 48
- Goals scored: 203 (4.23 per match)

The Caribbean Cup was the championship tournament for national association football teams that are members of the Caribbean Football Union.

== Entrants ==
- Anguilla
- Antigua and Barbuda
- Aruba
- Barbados
- British Virgin Islands
- Cayman Islands
- Cuba
- Dominica
- Dominican Republic
- Grenada
- Guadeloupe
- Guyana
- Haiti
- Jamaica
- Martinique
- Montserrat
- Puerto Rico
- Saint Kitts and Nevis
- Saint Martin
- Saint Lucia
- Saint Vincent and the Grenadines
- Suriname
- Trinidad and Tobago (Hosts and Defending Champions)
- U.S. Virgin Islands

=== Withdraws ===
- Bahamas
- Bermuda

== Qualifying tournament ==
=== Preliminary round ===
==== Group 1 ====
Team	Pts	Pld	W	D	L	GF	GA	GD
Saint-Martin	6	2	2	0	0	6	2	+4
Anguilla	3	2	1	0	1	5	4	+1
Montserrat	0	2	0	0	2	2	7	−5

6 February 2001

Saint-Martin	3–1	Montserrat
Benjamin 83', 89', 90'		Farrell 72'

Raoul Illidge Sports Complex
Saint Martin

8 February 2001

Anguilla	4–1	Montserrat
Rogers 3'; Connor 35', 65'; Edwards 38'		Morris 53'

Stade Jean-Louis Vanterpool
Saint Martin

10 February 2001

Saint-Martin	3–1	Anguilla
Benjamin 7'; Pindi 29'; Hodge 65'		Rogers 54'

Stade Jean-Louis Vanterpool
Saint Martin

==== Group 2 ====
3 February 2001

Puerto Rico	1–2	British Virgin Islands
Ortíz 63'		Simmons 6'; Azile 50'

Parque Country Club
San Jose, Puerto Rico

11 February 2001

British Virgin Islands	0–0	Puerto Rico

Shirley Recreation Ground
Tortola, British Virgin Islands

==== Group 3 ====
3 February 2001

Bahamas	n/p	U.S. Virgin Islands

Bahamas

10 February 2001

U.S. Virgin Islands	n/p	Bahamas

US Virgin Islands
- Bahamas withdrew meaning that US Virgin Islands progressed.

=== Qualifying round ===
Top team in each group and best runner up qualified for finals

==== Group 1 ====
Played in Guyana

Team	Pld	W	D	L	GF	GA	GD	Pts
Cuba	3	3	0	0	7	1	+6	9
Guyana	3	2	0	1	4	3	+1	6
Saint-Martin	3	1	0	2	3	5	−2	3
Dominica	3	0	0	3	3	8	−5	0

4 April 2001

Guyana	2–0	Saint-Martin
Cole 4'; Hercules 35'

Bourda Cricket Ground
Georgetown, Guyana
4 April 2001

Cuba	3–1	Dominica
Álvarez 5'; Márquez 86' (pen.); Bobadilla 90'		Casimir 49'

Uitvlugt Community Centre Ground
Uitvlugt, Guyana

6 April 2001

Guyana	2–0	Dominica
Hercules 50'; Brown 63' (pen.)

Bourda Cricket Ground
Georgetown, Guyana
6 April 2001

Cuba	1–0	Saint-Martin
Márquez 29' (pen.)

Uitvlugt Community Centre Ground
Uitvlugt, Guyana

8 April 2001

Dominica	2–3	Saint-Martin
Casimir 23'; Talbert 48'		Gedrey 31'; Hodge 42'; Flanders 78'

Bourda Cricket Ground
Georgetown, Guyana
8 April 2001

Guyana	0–3	Cuba
		Cruzata 40'; Prado 69'; Stevens 89'

Bourda Cricket Ground
Georgetown, Guyana

==== Group 2 ====
Played in Martinique

Team	Pld	W	D	L	GF	GA	GD	Pts
Martinique	3	2	1	0	10	1	+9	7
Saint Vincent and the Grenadines	3	1	1	1	7	4	+3	4
Cayman Islands	3	0	3	0	4	4	0	3
British Virgin Islands	3	0	1	2	2	14	−12	1

4 April 2001

Cayman Islands	2–2	British Virgin Islands
Anderson 19'; Brown 74'		Thomas 13'; Williams 48'

Stade Dillon
Fort-de-France, Martinique
4 April 2001

Martinique	3–0	Saint Vincent and the Grenadines
Percin 23'; Borval 61'; Gibon 69' (pen.)

Stade Dillon
Fort-de-France, Martinique

6 April 2001

Martinique	6–0	British Virgin Islands
Daniel Borval 39' 62' 73'; Loic Lupon 60'; Jean-Hubert Sophie 66' 73'

Stade Georges Gratian
Fort-de-France, Martinique
6 April 2001

Saint Vincent and the Grenadines	1–1	Cayman Islands
Nero 29'		Lindo 44'

Stade Georges Gratian
Fort-de-France, Martinique

8 April 2001

Saint Vincent and the Grenadines	6–0	British Virgin Islands
Guy 46', 55', 80', 84'; Haynes 75', 87'

Stade Dillon
Fort-de-France, Martinique
8 April 2001

Martinique	1–1	Cayman Islands
Lupon 45'		Ramoon 8'

Stade Dillon
Fort-de-France, Martinique

==== Group 3 ====
Played in Haiti

Team	Pld	W	D	L	GF	GA	GD	Pts
Haiti	3	3	0	0	17	3	+14	9
Saint Lucia	3	2	0	1	19	6	+13	6
Guadeloupe	3	1	0	2	13	5	+8	3
U.S. Virgin Islands	3	0	0	3	2	37	−35	0

10 April 2001

Guadeloupe	2–3	Saint Lucia

Haiti
10 April 2001

Haiti	12–1	U.S. Virgin Islands

Haiti

12 April 2001

Guadeloupe	11–0	U.S. Virgin Islands

Haiti
12 April 2001

Haiti	3–2	Saint Lucia

Haiti

14 April 2001

Haiti	2–0	Guadeloupe

Haiti
14 April 2001

Saint Lucia	14–1	U.S. Virgin Islands

Haiti

==== Group 4 ====
Played in Antigua and Barbuda (Bermuda were scheduled to be hosts but they withdrew)

Team	Pld	W	D	L	GF	GA	GD	Pts
Saint Kitts and Nevis	2	1	1	0	4	3	+1	4
Dominican Republic	2	1	0	1	4	4	0	3
Antigua and Barbuda	2	0	1	1	4	5	−1	1
Bermuda	0	0	0	0	0	0	0	0

1 March 2001

Saint Kitts and Nevis	2–1	Dominican Republic
Gumbs 27', 90'		Rodríguez 74'

Antigua Recreation Ground
St. John's, Antigua and Barbuda

3 March 2001

Antigua and Barbuda	2–3	Dominican Republic
Frederick 3', 76'		Estevez 2'; Pérez 71'; Aquino 90'

Antigua Recreation Ground
St. John's, Antigua and Barbuda

4 March 2001

Antigua and Barbuda	2–2	Saint Kitts and Nevis
Anthony 47', 52'		Mills 5'; Gumbs 11'

Antigua Recreation Ground
St. John's, Antigua and Barbuda

==== Group 5 ====
Played in Suriname

Team	Pld	W	D	L	GF	GA	GD	Pts
Suriname	3	2	1	0	10	3	+7	7
Barbados	3	2	1	0	9	5	+4	7
Grenada	3	1	0	2	6	7	−1	3
Aruba	3	0	0	3	4	14	−10	0

4 April 2001

Suriname	5–0	Aruba
Limon 2'; Grootfaam 16'; Vlijter 34'; Kejansie 39'; Kinsaine 58'

Andre Kamperveen Stadion
Paramaribo, Suriname
4 April 2001

Barbados	2–1	Grenada
Goodridge 12'; Forde 85'		Charles 52'

Andre Kamperveen Stadion
Paramaribo, Suriname

6 April 2001

Grenada	4–2	Aruba
Cyrus 41'; Charles 43', 47', 72'		Agungbero 25'; Lake 66'

Andre Kamperveen Stadion
Paramaribo, Suriname
6 April 2001

Suriname	2–2	Barbados
Vlijter 8'; Feller 54'		Stoute 41', 89'

Andre Kamperveen Stadion
Paramaribo, Suriname

8 April 2001

Suriname	3–1	Grenada
Kejansie 17'; Doesburg 67'; Sandvliet 78'		Cyrus 23'

Andre Kamperveen Stadion
Paramaribo, Suriname
8 April 2001

Barbados	5–2	Aruba
Riley 4'; Stoute 11'; Forde 14'; Goodridge 36' de Freitas 64'		Filomena 6'; Santana 73'

Andre Kamperveen Stadion
Paramaribo, Suriname

== Final tournament ==
Played in Trinidad and Tobago

=== First round ===
==== Group 1 ====
Team	Pld	W	D	L	GF	GA	GD	Pts
Trinidad and Tobago	3	2	0	1	8	3	+5	6
Martinique	3	2	0	1	5	3	+2	6
Jamaica	3	2	0	1	4	3	+1	6
Barbados	3	0	0	3	2	10	−8	0

15 May 2001

Trinidad and Tobago	5–0	Barbados
John 20', 50'; Dwarika 40'; Carrington 75'; Rahim 79'

Larry Gomes Stadium
Malabar, Trinidad and Tobago

15 May 2001

Jamaica	1–0	Martinique
Williams 60'

Larry Gomes Stadium
Malabar, Trinidad and Tobago

17 May 2001

Trinidad and Tobago	2–1	Jamaica
Eve 62'; Rahim 70'		Harris 27'

Hasely Crawford Stadium
Port of Spain, Trinidad and Tobago

17 May 2001

Martinique	3–1	Barbados
Rano 22', 46'; Clement 64'		Riley 29' pen

Hasely Crawford Stadium
Port of Spain, Trinidad and Tobago

19 May 2001

Trinidad and Tobago	1–2	Martinique
Lawrence 29'		Rano 8'; Percin 79'

Hasely Crawford Stadium
Port of Spain, Trinidad and Tobago

19 May 2001

Jamaica	2–1	Barbados
Wolde Harris 14' (pen.); Taylor 27'		Riley 29'

Hasely Crawford Stadium
Port of Spain, Trinidad and Tobago

==== Group 2 ====
Team	Pld	W	D	L	GF	GA	GD	Pts
Haiti	3	1	2	0	8	3	+5	5
Cuba	3	1	2	0	5	4	+1	5
Saint Kitts and Nevis	3	1	1	1	7	8	−1	4
Suriname	3	0	1	2	4	9	−5	1

16 May 2001

Cuba	4–3	Suriname
Delgado 30', 34', 47', 60'		Kejansie 2'; Weibolt 17'; Sandvliet 81'

Marvin Lee Stadium
Tunapuna, Trinidad and Tobago

16 May 2001

Haiti	7–2	Saint Kitts and Nevis
Holman 8', 45'; Pierre 25', 54', 77', 83'; Clerjuste 89'		Saddler 3'; Gumbs 74'

Marvin Lee Stadium
Tunapuna, Trinidad and Tobago

18 May 2001

Saint Kitts and Nevis	1–1	Cuba
Huggins 26'		Prado 55'

Marvin Lee Stadium
Tunapuna, Trinidad and Tobago

18 May 2001

Suriname	1–1	Haiti
Feller 85'		Pierre 2'

Marvin Lee Stadium
Tunapuna, Trinidad and Tobago

20 May 2001

Cuba	0–0	Haiti

Larry Gomes Stadium
Malabar, Trinidad and Tobago

20 May 2001

Suriname	0–4	Saint Kitts and Nevis
		Cannonier 26'; Huggins 52'; Gumbs 63'; Doynin 88'

Larry Gomes Stadium
Malabar, Trinidad and Tobago

=== Semi-finals ===
22 May 2001

Trinidad and Tobago	2–0	Cuba
Dwarika 33' (pen.); John 60'

Hasely Crawford Stadium
Port of Spain, Trinidad and Tobago

22 May 2001

Haiti	5–0	Martinique
Monprenier 17', 63'; Thelusma 28' (pen.); Sala 84'; Holman 88'

Hasely Crawford Stadium
Port of Spain, Trinidad and Tobago

=== Third-place match ===
24 May 2001

Cuba	0–1	Martinique
		Gibon 74' (pen.)

Hasely Crawford Stadium
Port of Spain, Trinidad and Tobago

=== Final ===
25 May 2001

Trinidad and Tobago	3–0	Haiti
Saunders 28'; Rahim 67'; Dwarika 77'

Hasely Crawford Stadium
Port of Spain, Trinidad and Tobago

Trinidad & Tobago, Haiti and Martinique qualified automatically for 2002 CONCACAF Gold Cup. Fourth-placed team qualified for home and away playoff against fourth-placed team in UNCAF Nations Cup 2001.

2001 Caribbean Cup winner

Trinidad and Tobago
Eighth title
