= Kyran Samadi =

British Virgin Islands footballer

Personal information
- Date of birth: 7 April 2006 (age 20)
- Place of birth: Bournemouth, England
- Position: Striker

Team information
- Current team: Bashley FC
- Number: 7

Youth career
- –2023: Eastleigh

Senior career*
Years	Team	Apps	(Gls)
2023–2024	Poole Town	27	(3)
2024–2025	Dorchester Town	8	(0)
2025	→ Bashley (loan)	10	(3)
2025–	Bashley	5	(3)

International career^{‡}
2025–	British Virgin Islands	2	(1)
- * Club domestic league appearances and goals as of 14:58, 17 November 2025 (UTC) ‡ National team caps and goals as of 14:58, 17 November 2025 (UTC)

Kyran Samadi (born 07 April 2006) is a British Virgin Islands footballer who currently plays for Bashley FC and the British Virgin Islands national team.

== Club career ==
As a youth, Samadi played for the academy of Eastleigh until late 2023. For the 2024/25 season, he moved to Poole Town. During the season, he made thirty-two appearances for the club, scoring four goals. One of his goals was then named the team's Goal of the Season. After the season, Samadi followed his former Poole Town manager Tom Killick with a move to Dorchester Town. In January 2025, Samadi joined Bashley on a one-month loan from Dorchester Town to gain more first-team experience. In August 2025, Samadi joined Bashley on a permanent deal for the 2025/2026 season. He made an immediate impact for the club, scoring a hat-trick in a 3–1 league victory over Didcot Town in September 2025.

== International career ==
At the youth level, Samadi represented the British Virgin Islands in 2022 CONCACAF U-17 Championship qualifying. He made his senior international debut on 12 November 2025 in a 2–1 victory over the Cayman Islands. Three days later, he scored his first senior international goal in a 6–0 victory over the Bahamas.

=== International goals ===
Scores and results list the British Virgin Islands' goal tally first.

No.	Date	Venue	Opponent	Score	Result	Competition
1.	15 November 2025	Truman Bodden Sports Complex, George Town, Cayman Islands	Bahamas	3–0	6–0	2025–26 CONCACAF Series
Last updated 17 November 2025

=== International statistics ===
As of match played 15 November 2025

British Virgin Islands
Year	Apps	Goals
2025	2	1
Total	2	1

== Club statistics ==
As of match played 8 November 2025

Appearances and goals by club, season and competition
Club	Season	League			FA Cup		League Cup		Other		Total	
Club	Season	Division	Apps	Goals	Apps	Goals	Apps	Goals	Apps	Goals	Apps	Goals
Poole Town	2023–24	Southern League Premier Division South	27	3	0	0	0	0	5	1	32	4
Dorchester Town	2024–25	Southern League Premier Division South	7	0	0	0	0	0	4	0	11	0
Bashley (loan)	2024–25	Southern League Division One South	10	3	0	0	0	0	0	0	10	3
Dorchester Town	2025–26	Southern League Premier Division South	1	0	0	0	0	0	0	0	1	0
Bashley	2025–26	Southern League Division One South	5	3	0	0	0	0	1	0	6	3
Career total			50	9	0	0	0	0	10	1	60	10
