= Charles McLean =

Charles McLean may refer to:

- Charles McLean (football coach) (born 1959), football coach from Cayman Islands
- Charles McLean (rugby union) (1892–1965), New Zealand rugby union player

== See also ==
- Charles Maclean (disambiguation)
- Charles McLean Andrews, American historian
