= Jefford =

Jefford is a surname. Notable people with the surname include:

- Andrew Jefford (born 1956), English journalist.
- Barbara Jefford (1930–2020), British actresses
- Calvin Jefford (born 1987), Caymanian footballer
- James Wilfred Jefford (1901–1980), first Commander-in-Chief of the Royal Pakistan Navy
- Nerys Jefford, British high court judge and barrister
- Ruth Jefford (1914–2007), American musician

See also

- Jefford Point, is a point formed by a rock cliff surmounted by ice, located 8 nautical miles east-northeast of Cape Foster on the south coast of James Ross Island, Antarctica .
- Jeffords
