= Charles Maclean =

Charles Maclean may refer to:

- Charles Fraser MacLean (1841–1924), American jurist
- Sir Charles Maclean, 9th Baronet (1798–1883), 25th Chief, 1847–83
- Charles Maclean, Baron Maclean (1916–1990), 27th Chief, 1936–90
- Charles Rawden Maclean (1815–1880), alias "John Ross", an opponent of slavery
- Charles W. MacLean (1903–1985), suffragan bishop of the Episcopal Diocese of Long Island
- Charles Maclean (writer) (fl. 1788–1824), British medical and political writer

== See also ==
- Charles McLean (disambiguation)
