= D'Andre Rowe =

Caymanian footballer

Personal information
- Date of birth: 5 January 2001 (age 25)
- Place of birth: George Town, Cayman Islands
- Position: Defensive midfielder

Senior career*
Years	Team	Apps	(Gls)
2017–	Cayman Athletic		

International career^{‡}
2015–2016	Cayman Islands U15		
2016–2017	Cayman Islands U17		
2018	Cayman Islands U20	4	(0)
2019–	Cayman Islands U23		
2019–	Cayman Islands	3	(0)
- * Club domestic league appearances and goals as of 26 March 2021 ‡ National team caps and goals as of 26 March 2021

D'Andre Rowe (born 5 January 2001) is a Caymanian footballer who plays as a defensive midfielder.

== Career statistics ==
As of match played 26 March 2021

Appearances and goals by national team and year
National team	Year	Apps	Goals
Cayman Islands	2019	2	0
Cayman Islands	2021	1	0
Total		3	0
