= Alessio Raballo =

Cuban footballer (born 2004)

Personal information
- Full name: Alessio Raballo Diaz
- Date of birth: 9 September 2006 (age 20)
- Place of birth: Turin, Italy
- Height: 1.86 m (6 ft 1 in)
- Position: Forward

Team information
- Current team: Pavia
- Number: 45

Youth career
- CBS Scuola Calcio
- 2019–2025: Torino
- 2025: → Parma (loan)
- 2025–2026: → Cremonese (loan)
- 2026: → Empoli (loan)

Senior career*
Years	Team	Apps	(Gls)
2024–2026	Torino	0	(0)
2026–	Pavia	9	(3)

International career^{‡}
2025	Cuba U20	3	(1)
2026–	Cuba U21	3	(1)
2025–	Cuba	7	(1)
- * Club domestic league appearances and goals as of 23:45, 8 November 2026 (UTC) ‡ National team caps and goals as of 23:45, 16 November 2026 (UTC)

Alessio Raballo Diaz (born 9 September 2006) is a professional footballer who plays as forward for Serie D club Pavia. Born in Italy, he plays for the Cuba national team.

== Club career ==
A youth product of CBS Scuola Calcio, Raballo joined the youth academy of Serie A club Torino in 2019 where he finished his development. On 29 December 2024, he received his first call-up with the Torino senior squad for a Serie A match against Udinese, as an unused substitute however.

On 3 February 2025, he was loaned to fellow Serie A club Parma for the second half of the 2024–25 season, joining their Primavera squad immediately.

On 28 August 2025, Raballo joined the under-20 team of recently promoted Serie A club Cremonese, on an initial one-year loan with an option to buy at the end of the 2025–26 season. His loan with Cremonese was cut-short and he then joined the Primavera of Empoli, on loan for the rest of the season.

On 10 September 2026, he signed with Serie D club Pavia as a free agent, ahead of the 2026–27 season.

== International career ==
Raballo was born in Italy to an Italian father and a Cuban mother. He was called up to the Cuba national team for 2025 CONCACAF Gold Cup matches in March 2025. Alongside Camilo Pinillo, they were the first foreign-born players called up to the national team in nearly 60 years.

== Career statistics ==
=== International ===
Scores and results list Cuba's goal tally first.

List of international goals scored by Alessio Raballo
No.	Date	Venue	Opponent	Score	Result	Competition
1.	15 November 2025	Estadio Cibao FC, Santiago de los Caballeros, Dominican Republic	Martinique	2–0	2–0	2025–26 CONCACAF Series
