= Chandler González =

Cuban football manager (born 1973)

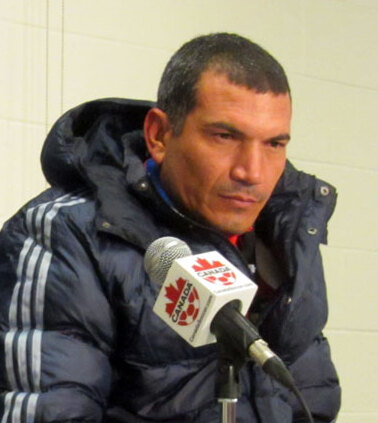
- González in 2012

Personal information
- Full name: Alexander González Garces
- Date of birth: 1 January 1973 (age 53)
- Place of birth: Cuba

Managerial career
- Years: Team
- 2012: Cuba
- 2015–2018: Cayman Islands
- 2018: Cayman Islands

Alexander González Garces (born 5 May 1973) is a Cuban football coach.

== Career ==
On 16 April 2012, González was appointed as the national team manager of the Cuba national team. He was appointed following a spell in charge of the Cuban representative team at the 2011 Pan American Games.
