= Jeffords =

Jeffords is a surname. Notable people with the surname include:

- Carl Jeffords (1888–1972), American politician from Nebraska
- Elza Jeffords (1826–1885), American politician from Mississippi
- Harrison Jeffords (1834–1863), American colonel and hero of the American Civil War
- Jim Jeffords (1934–2014), American former U.S. Senator from Vermont
- Olin M. Jeffords (1890–1964), American attorney and judge
- Tom Jeffords (1832–1914), American United States Army scout, Indian agent, prospector, and prominent resident of the Arizona Territory

See also

- Jefford
