= O'Neil Taylor =

Caymanian footballer

Personal information
- Full name: O'Neil Taylor
- Date of birth: 22 December 1980 (age 45)
- Place of birth: Cayman Islands
- Position: Midfielder

Team information
- Current team: Scholars International

International career^{‡}
Years	Team	Apps	(Gls)
2008–	Cayman Islands	4	(0)
- ‡ National team caps and goals as of 19:14, 10 April 2012 (UTC)

O'Neil Taylor (born 22 December 1980) is a Caymanian footballer who plays as a midfielder. He has represented the Cayman Islands during a World Cup qualifying match in 2008 and the 2010 Caribbean Championship.
