= Benjamin Pugh =

English football manager

Personal information
- Full name: Benjamin Robert Pugh
- Date of birth: 23 November 1989 (age 36)
- Place of birth: Ipswich, England

Managerial career
- Years: Team
- 2005–2013: Shotley Rangers (youth football)
- 2012–2018: Ipswich Town (academy)
- 2018–2019: Academy SC
- 2019–2021: Cayman Islands
- 2022–2023: Ipswich Town (academy)

Benjamin Robert Pugh (born 23 November 1989) is an English professional football manager who is the former manager of the Cayman Islands National Football Team.

== Coaching career ==
In January 2019, Pugh was appointed assistant coach of the Cayman Islands. In July 2019, Pugh was appointed head coach of the Cayman Islands national team as well as the U23 Olympic team.

Pugh started his reign as senior head coach with two wins against the US Virgin Islands and Barbados in the CONCACAF Nations League Group C.

== Managerial statistics ==
As of 9 June 2022

Team	From	To	Record				
Team	From	To	G	W	D	L	Win %
Cayman Islands	January 2019	2021	13	4	3	6	30.77
