= Kévin Appin =

Martiniquais footballer (born 1998)

Personal information
- Full name: Kévin Sebastien Appin
- Date of birth: 20 January 1998 (age 28)
- Place of birth: Marseille, France
- Height: 1.77 m (5 ft 9 1/2 in)
- Position: Midfielder

Team information
- Current team: Burgos
- Number: 10

Youth career
- 2013–2018: Monaco

Senior career*
Years	Team	Apps	(Gls)
2017–2018	Monaco II	35	(0)
2018–2020	Monaco	0	(0)
2018–2019	→ Cercle Brugge (loan)	7	(0)
2020–2021	Hércules	20	(0)
2021–2023	Ibiza	64	(1)
2023–	Burgos	74	(6)

International career^{‡}
2022–	Martinique	7	(1)
- * Club domestic league appearances and goals as of 6 June 2026 ‡ National team caps and goals as of 5 September 2024

Kévin Sebastien Appin (born 20 January 1998) is a professional footballer. He plays as a midfielder for Segunda División club Burgos. Born in metropolitan France, he plays for the Martinique national team.

== Club career ==
A youth product of the AS Monaco FC academy, Appin was loaned to Cercle Brugge on 16 June 2018. Appin made his professional debut with Cercle Brugge in a 4–0 Belgian First Division A loss to Club Brugge KV on 29 September 2018.

On 4 October 2020, Appin moved abroad and joined Hércules in the Spanish Segunda División B. On 8 June 2021, after featuring regularly, he joined newly promoted Segunda División club Ibiza on a one-year deal.

On 4 August 2023, Appin signed a two-year contract with Burgos also in the Spanish second division.

== International career ==
Appin was born in mainland France and is of Martiniquais descent. He was called up to the Martinique national team for 2022–23 CONCACAF Nations League matches in June 2022.

== International goals ==
No.	Date	Venue	Opponent	Score	Result	Competition
1	26 March 2026	Estadio Cibao, Santiago, Dominican Republic	Martinique	1–1	2–2	2025–26 CONCACAF Series
