= Ian Lindo =

Caymanian footballer

Personal information
- Full name: Ian Albert Lindo
- Date of birth: 30 April 1983 (age 43)
- Place of birth: Cayman Islands
- Positions: Defender; midfielder

Team information
- Current team: George Town

Senior career*
Years	Team	Apps	(Gls)
2002–	George Town		

International career
2001–2011	Cayman Islands	23	(1)
- * Club domestic league appearances and goals

Ian Albert Lindo (born 30 April 1983) is a Caymanian footballer who plays for George Town SC.

== Career statistics ==
As of match played 14 November 2011.

National team	Year	Apps	Goals
Cayman Islands	2001	2	1
Cayman Islands	2002	3	0
Cayman Islands	2003	0	0
Cayman Islands	2004	1	0
Cayman Islands	2005	0	0
Cayman Islands	2006	0	0
Cayman Islands	2007	0	0
Cayman Islands	2008	8	0
Cayman Islands	2009	1	0
Cayman Islands	2010	3	0
Cayman Islands	2011	5	0
Total		23	1

=== International goals ===
Scores and results list the Cayman Islands' goal tally first.

No.	Date	Venue	Opponent	Score	Result	Competition
1.	6 April 2001	Stade George Gratian, Fort-de-France, Martinique	Saint Vincent and the Grenadines	1–1	1–1	2001 Caribbean Cup
