= 2025–26 CONCACAF Series =

1st edition of the CONCACAF Series

Tournament details
- Dates: 12 November 2025 – 30 March 2026
- Teams: 20 (from 1 confederation)
- Venues: 5 (in 5 host cities)

Tournament statistics
- Matches played: 35
- Goals scored: 109 (3.11 per match)
- Top scorer: (Guyana) Osaze De Rosario (7 goals)

The 2025–26 CONCACAF Series was the first edition of the CONCACAF Series, a football international friendly tournament organized by CONCACAF. The tournament was meant to provide matches for member nations that were already eliminated from 2026 FIFA World Cup qualification.

== History ==
At CONCACAF's 28th Extraordinary Congress in June 2025, it was announced that the confederation planned to hold an optional tournament for member nations that were already eliminated from 2026 FIFA World Cup qualification, as well as associations that were not members of FIFA. The tournament, which would mimic the format of the FIFA Series, would provide meaningful matches for participants before the 2026–27 CONCACAF Nations League. Matches took place at centralized locations, with one location hosting each group in the November 2025 and March 2026 international match windows.

== November 2025 Series ==
=== Group A ===
Pos	Team	Pld	W	D	L	GF	GA	GD	Pts	Qualification
1	Cuba	2	2	0	0	5	0	+5	6	
2	Dominican Republic (H)	2	1	1	0	2	0	+2	4	
3	Saint Vincent and the Grenadines	2	1	0	1	3	3	0	3	Transfer to Group C
4	Martinique	2	0	1	1	0	2	−2	1	
5	Saint Lucia	2	0	0	2	1	6	−5	0	Redirect to 2026 FIFA Series

Source: Flashscore
Rules for classification: Group stage tiebreakers
(H) Hosts
12 November 2025
17:00 AST

Cuba	3–0	Saint Lucia
Torres 38'; Matos 45+1'; Reyes 53'	Report

Estadio Cibao FC, Santiago de los Caballeros
Referee: Jorge Leira (Panama)
12 November 2025
20:00 AST

Dominican Republic	2–0	Saint Vincent and the Grenadines
Mörschel 17'; Paniagua 57'	Report

Estadio Cibao FC, Santiago de los Caballeros
Referee: Josúe Ugalde (Costa Rica)

15 November 2025
17:00 AST

Martinique	0–2	Cuba
	Report	Matos 41'; Raballo 45'

Estadio Cibao FC, Santiago de los Caballeros
Referee: Jefferson Escobar (Honduras)
15 November 2025
20:00 AST

Saint Vincent and the Grenadines	3–1	Saint Lucia
Anderson 12'; Spring 13'; Solomon 63'	Report	Elva 45+2'

Estadio Cibao FC, Santiago de los Caballeros
Referee: Timothy Derry (Trinidad and Tobago)

18 November 2025
19:30 AST

Dominican Republic	0–0	Martinique
	Report

Estadio Cibao FC, Santiago de los Caballeros
Referee: Ray Torres (Puerto Rico)

=== Group B ===
Pos	Team	Pld	W	D	L	GF	GA	GD	Pts	Qualification
1	Belize	2	2	0	0	7	2	+5	6	
2	Sint Maarten	2	1	1	0	3	2	+1	4	
3	Saint Martin	2	1	0	1	2	2	0	3	Transfer to Group C
4	Saint Kitts and Nevis (H)	2	0	1	1	2	6	−4	1	Redirect to 2026 FIFA Series
5	Dominica	2	0	0	2	3	5	−2	0	

Source: Flashscore
Rules for classification: Group stage tiebreakers
(H) Hosts
12 November 2025
16:00 AST

Dominica	1–2	Saint Martin
Jules 47'	Report	Bellechasse 79', 90+1' (pen.)

SKNFA Technical Center, Basseterre
Referee: Randy Encarnación (Dominican Republic)
12 November 2025
19:00 AST

Saint Kitts and Nevis	0–0	Sint Maarten
	Report

SKNFA Technical Center, Basseterre
Referee: Moeth Gaymes (Saint Vicent and the Grenadines)

15 November 2025
16:00 AST

Dominica	2–3	Sint Maarten
Joseph 43', 71'	Report	Bleeker 22'; De Nooijer 66'; Amatkarijo 75' (pen.)

SKNFA Technical Center, Basseterre
15 November 2025
19:00 AST

Saint Martin	0–1	Belize
	Report	Wade 26'

SKNFA Technical Center, Basseterre

18 November 2025
16:00 AST

Saint Kitts and Nevis	2–6	Belize
Matthew 71', 85'	Report	Wade 9', 28', 43'; Meza 80', 82'; Martínez 90+3'

SKNFA Technical Center, Basseterre
Referee: James Ramprashad (British Virgin Islands)

=== Group C ===
Pos	Team	Pld	W	D	L	GF	GA	GD	Pts	Qualification
1	Guyana	2	2	0	0	6	2	+4	6	Transfer to Group B
2	Aruba	2	1	1	0	3	0	+3	4	Redirect to 2026 FIFA Series
3	Barbados	2	1	0	1	3	5	−2	3	
4	Antigua and Barbuda (H)	2	0	1	1	1	4	−3	1	Withdrewal
5	Bonaire	2	0	0	2	3	5	−2	0	

Source: Flashscore
Rules for classification: Group stage tiebreakers
(H) Hosts
12 November 2025
16:00 AST

Barbados	3–2	Bonaire
Oughterson 10', 45+1'; Applewhaite 34'	Report	Cicilia 55'; Gerardo-Felicia 90+2'

Sir Vivian Richards Stadium, North Sound
Referee: Michael Akangou (Cayman Islands)
12 November 2025
19:00 AST

Antigua and Barbuda	0–0	Aruba
	Report

Sir Vivian Richards Stadium, North Sound
Referee: Hakeem Harvey (Saint Kitts and Nevis)

15 November 2025
16:00 AST

Barbados	0–3	Aruba
	Report	Poulina 4'; Romano 59'; Fermina 76'

Sir Vivian Richards Stadium, North Sound
Referee: Evens Julmis (Bahamas)
15 November 2025
19:00 AST

Guyana	2–1	Bonaire
Duke-McKenna 5'; De Rosario 77'	Report	Clijdesdale 16'

Sir Vivian Richards Stadium, North Sound
Referee: José Corporán (Dominican Republic)

18 November 2025
19:00 AST

Antigua and Barbuda	1–4	Guyana
Griffith 61' (pen.)	Report	Glasgow 11', 23' (pen.); De Rosario 71'; Duke-McKenna 76'

Sir Vivian Richards Stadium, North Sound
Referee: Andrew Samuel (Trinidad and Tobago)

=== Group D ===
Pos	Team	Pld	W	D	L	GF	GA	GD	Pts
1	British Virgin Islands	2	2	0	0	8	1	+7	6
2	Cayman Islands (H)	2	1	0	1	5	2	+3	3
3	Anguilla	2	1	0	1	2	5	−3	3
4	Bahamas	2	0	0	2	1	8	−7	0

Source: Flashscore
Rules for classification: Group stage tiebreakers
(H) Hosts
12 November 2025
16:30 EST

Bahamas	1–2	Anguilla
Bayles 52' (pen.)	Report	Connor 11'; Jackson 87'

Truman Bodden Sports Complex, George Town
Referee: Micah Erskine (Guyana)
12 November 2025
19:00 EST

Cayman Islands	1–2	British Virgin Islands
Seymour 38'	Report	Bonilla 62' (o.g.); Splatt 81' (pen.)

Truman Bodden Sports Complex, George Town
Referee: Kimbell Ward (Saint Kitts and Nevis)

15 November 2025
16:30 EST

Bahamas	0–6	British Virgin Islands
	Report	Splatt 5', 41', 52'; Samadi 44'; Javier 50'; Chalwell 72'

Truman Bodden Sports Complex, George Town
Referee: Shavin Greene (Guyana)
15 November 2025
19:00 EST

Cayman Islands	4–0	Anguilla
Studenhofft 16' (pen.), 58'; Scott 28'; O. Ebanks 84'	Report

Truman Bodden Sports Complex, George Town
Referee: Amaury Majors (Bermuda)

== March 2026 Series ==
=== Changes in groups ===
The following changes were made to each group prior to the March 2026 phase of the competition:

Group A

- Saint Lucia withdrew, instead competing in the 2026 FIFA Series.
- Saint Vincent and the Grenadines transferred to Group C.
- El Salvador made its debut.

Group B

- Saint Kitts and Nevis withdrew, instead competing in the 2026 FIFA Series.
- Saint Martin transferred to Group C.
- Guyana arrived from Group C.
- Venue changed to Santiago de los Caballeros.

Group C

- Aruba withdrew, instead competing in the 2026 FIFA Series.
- Antigua and Barbuda withdrew.
- Guyana transferred to Group B.
- Saint Vincent and the Grenadines arrived from Group A.
- Saint Martin arrived from Group B.
- Venue changed to Rincon.

Group D

- No changes.

=== Group A ===
Pos	Team	Pld	W	D	L	GF	GA	GD	Pts
1	El Salvador	2	1	1	0	3	2	+1	4
2	Dominican Republic (H)	2	0	2	0	3	3	0	2
3	Cuba	2	0	2	0	3	3	0	2
4	Martinique	2	0	1	1	2	3	−1	1

Source: Flashscore
Rules for classification: Group stage tiebreakers
(H) Hosts
26 March 2026
17:00 AST

Martinique	2–2	Cuba
Appin 26'; Antiste 42' (pen.)	Report	Paradela 22'; Espino 50'

Estadio Cibao FC, Santiago de los Caballeros
Referee: David Gómez (Costa Rica)
26 March 2026
20:00 AST

Dominican Republic	2–2	El Salvador
Firpo 15'; Romero 90+4' (pen.)	Report	Ordaz 62', 78'

Estadio Cibao FC, Santiago de los Caballeros
Referee: Oliver Vergara (Panama)

29 March 2026
15:00 AST

Martinique	0–1	El Salvador
	Report	M. Gil 90+2'

Estadio Cibao FC, Santiago de los Caballeros
Referee: Jefferson Escobar (Honduras)
29 March 2026
18:00 AST

Dominican Republic	1–1	Cuba
Romero 53'	Report	D. Reyes 51'

Estadio Cibao FC, Santiago de los Caballeros
Referee: Roger Mélendez (Nicaragua)

=== Group B ===
Pos	Team	Pld	W	D	L	GF	GA	GD	Pts
1	Guyana	2	2	0	0	5	1	+4	6
2	Sint Maarten	2	1	1	0	3	2	+1	4
3	Dominica	2	0	1	1	0	2	−2	1
4	Belize	2	0	0	2	3	6	−3	0

Source: Flashscore
Rules for classification: Group stage tiebreakers
27 March 2026
16:30 AST

Guyana	2–0	Dominica
De Rosario 28', 31'	Report

Estadio Cibao FC, Santiago de los Caballeros
Referee: Patrick Senecharles (Haiti)
27 March 2026
19:30 AST

Belize	2–3	Sint Maarten
Reneau 37' (pen.); Polanco 55'	Report	Illidge 34'; Amatkarijo 77', 90+1'

Estadio Cibao FC, Santiago de los Caballeros
Referee: Wikelson Bonnet (Haiti)

30 March 2026
16:30 AST

Guyana	3–1	Belize
De Rosario 2', 22', 90'	Report	Wade 8'

Estadio Cibao FC, Santiago de los Caballeros
Referee: Eric de la Cruz (Cuba)
30 March 2026
19:30 AST

Dominica	0–0	Sint Maarten
	Report

Estadio Cibao FC, Santiago de los Caballeros
Referee: Adrian Lage (Cuba)

=== Group C ===
Pos	Team	Pld	W	D	L	GF	GA	GD	Pts
1	Saint Martin	2	2	0	0	6	1	+5	6
2	Saint Vincent and the Grenadines	2	1	0	1	4	5	−1	3
3	Bonaire (H)	2	1	0	1	3	4	−1	3
4	Barbados	2	0	0	2	3	6	−3	0

Source: Flashscore
Rules for classification: Group stage tiebreakers
(H) Hosts
26 March 2026
16:00 AST

Saint Martin	3–1	Barbados
Léo 56', 57'; Williams 87' (o.g.)	Report	Oughterson 85'

Stadion Antonio Trenidat, Rincon
Referee: Shekiel Jokil (Suriname)
26 March 2026
20:30 AST

Bonaire	3–1	Saint Vincent and the Grenadines
Koorn 39'; Christopher 57' (o.g.); Isenia 77' (pen.)	Report	Pierre 37'

Stadion Antonio Trenidat, Rincon
Referee: Norberto da Silva (Curaçao)

29 March 2026
16:00 AST

Barbados	2–3	Saint Vincent and the Grenadines
Banton 51'; Oughterson 59'	Report	Franklyn 28'; Solomon 38'; Anderson 78'

Stadion Antonio Trenidat, Rincon
Referee: Evens Julmis (Bahamas)
29 March 2026
20:30 AST

Bonaire	0–3	Saint Martin
	Report	Alexandre 39'; Léo 51'; Denis 68'

Stadion Antonio Trenidat, Rincon
Referee: Félix Mojica (Nicaragua)

=== Group D ===
Pos	Team	Pld	W	D	L	GF	GA	GD	Pts
1	British Virgin Islands	2	1	1	0	5	1	+4	4
2	Cayman Islands (H)	2	1	1	0	2	1	+1	4
3	Anguilla	2	1	0	1	3	5	−2	3
4	Bahamas	2	0	0	2	1	4	−3	0

Source: Flashscore
Rules for classification: Group stage tiebreakers
(H) Hosts
26 March 2026
16:30 EST

Bahamas	1–3	Anguilla
Holcombe 15'	Report	Tesselaar 43', 52' (pen.); Guishard 83'

Truman Bodden Sports Complex, George Town
Referee: Renlee Napoleon (Saint Lucia)
26 March 2026
19:00 EST

Cayman Islands	1–1	British Virgin Islands
Silburn 7'	Report	Splatt 20'

Truman Bodden Sports Complex, George Town
Referee: Alexi Perry (Jamaica)

29 March 2026
16:30 EST

British Virgin Islands	4–0	Anguilla
T. Forbes 5', 39'; Chalwell 32' (pen.); Lacey 78'	Report

Truman Bodden Sports Complex, George Town
Referee: Sergio Rozenhout (Suriname)
29 March 2026
19:00 EST

Cayman Islands	1–0	Bahamas
Kelly 59' (o.g.)	Report

Truman Bodden Sports Complex, George Town
Referee: Tristley Bassue (Saint Kitts and Nevis)

== Goalscorers ==
There were 109 goals scored in 35 matches, for an average of 3.11 goals per match.

7 goals

- (Guyana) Osaze De Rosario

5 goals

- (Belize) Desmond Wade
- (British Virgin Islands) Javaun Splatt

4 goals

- (Barbados) Jaron Oughterson

3 goals

- (Collectivity of Saint Martin) Jean-Baptiste Léo
- (Sint Maarten) Chovanie Amatkarijo

2 goals

- (Anguilla) Jan-Willem Tesselaar
- (Belize) Marlon Meza Jr.
- (British Virgin Islands) Luka Chalwell
- (British Virgin Islands) Tyler Forbes
- (Cayman Islands) Gunnar Studenhofft
- (Cuba) Yasniel Matos
- (Cuba) Dairon Reyes
- (Dominica) Travist Joseph
- (Dominican Republic) Dorny Romero
- (El Salvador) Nathan Ordaz
- (Guyana) Stephen Duke-McKenna
- (Guyana) Omari Glasgow
- (Saint Kitts and Nevis) Javern Matthew
- (Collectivity of Saint Martin) Yannick Bellechasse
- (Saint Vincent and the Grenadines) Oalex Anderson
- (Saint Vincent and the Grenadines) Azinho Solomon

1 goal

- (Anguilla) Mekhi Connor
- (Anguilla) Jonathan Guishard
- (Anguilla) Tarique Jackson
- (Antigua and Barbuda) Quinton Grifftih
- (Aruba) Carlito Fermina
- (Aruba) Quinlan Poulina
- (Aruba) Jaybrien Romano
- (The Bahamas) William Bayles
- (The Bahamas) Robert Holcombe
- (Barbados) Ackeel Applewhaite
- (Barbados) Ajani Banton
- (Belize) Eugene Martinez
- (Belize) Jordy Polanco
- (Belize) Eldon Reneau
- (Bonaire) Lemus Christopher
- (Bonaire) Ayrton Cicilia
- (Bonaire) Ronalchio Clijdesdale
- (Bonaire) Ninho Gerardo-Felicia
- (Bonaire) Christopher Isenia
- (Bonaire) Devin Koorn
- (British Virgin Islands) Kristian Javier
- (British Virgin Islands) Johari Lacey
- (British Virgin Islands) Kyran Samadi
- (Cayman Islands) Owens Ebanks
- (Cayman Islands) Zachary Scott
- (Cayman Islands) Elijah Seymour
- (Cayman Islands) Shakurn Silburn
- (Cuba) Karel Espino
- (Cuba) Luis Paradela
- (Cuba) Alessio Raballo
- (Cuba) Romario Torres
- (Dominica) Troy Jules
- (Dominican Republic) Junior Firpo
- (Dominican Republic) Heinz Mörschel
- (Dominican Republic) Erick Paniagua
- (El Salvador) Mayer Gil
- (Martinique) Janis Antiste
- (Martinique) Kévin Appin
- (Saint Lucia) Caniggia Elva
- (Collectivity of Saint Martin) Jordan Alexandre
- (Collectivity of Saint Martin) Malik Denis
- (Saint Vincent and the Grenadines) Kirtney Franklyn
- (Saint Vincent and the Grenadines) Steven Pierre
- (Saint Vincent and the Grenadines) Diel Spring
- (Sint Maarten) Len Bleeker
- (Sint Maarten) T-Shawn Illidge
- (Sint Maarten) Mitchell de Nooijer

1 own goal

- (The Bahamas) Junior Kelly (against Cayman Islands)
- (Barbados) Mario Williams (against Saint Martin)
- (Cayman Islands) Jordan Bonilla (against British Virgin Islands)
