= Lachlin Lambert =

Cayman Islands footballer

Personal information
- Full name: Bruce Lachlin Taggart Lambert
- Date of birth: 14 June 2006 (age 20)
- Place of birth: Hamilton, Ontario, Canada
- Position: Goalkeeper

Team information
- Current team: NK Dugopolje

Youth career
- –2021: Academy SC
- 2021–2024: Darlington Soccer Academy

Senior career*
Years	Team	Apps	(Gls)
2025–	NK Dugopolje	0	(0)

International career^{‡}
2023–	Cayman Islands	11	(0)
- * Club domestic league appearances and goals as of 13:48, 4 September 2025 (UTC) ‡ National team caps and goals as of 13:48, 4 September 2025 (UTC)

Lachlin Lambert (born 14 June 2006) is a Cayman Islands association footballer who plays for Prva NL club NK Dugopolje and the Cayman Islands national team.

== Club career ==
As a youth, Lambert played for the junior sides of Academy SC in the Cayman Youth Leagues. In 2021, he moved to the United States and began a four-year stint at the Soccer Academy at the Darlington School in Rome, Georgia, graduating in 2024.

In August 2025, it was announced that Lambert had signed a professional contract with NK Dugopolje of the Prva NL, the second tier of the Croatian football league system, through May 2026. At that time, he was also registered with NK Croatia Zmijavci of the same league. The player said he chose Dugopolje from several after trialing with the club in July 2025 because he felt it was the best fit for his goals and development as he began his career in Europe .

== International career ==
Lambert represented the Cayman Islands at the youth level in 2024 CONCACAF U-20 Championship qualifying. In October and November 2023, he was called up to the senior national team. He made his senior debut as a starter on 17 October 2023 at age seventeen. The eventual 2–1 2023–24 CONCACAF Nations League C victory over the United States Virgin Islands was the Cayman Islands' first win in nearly four years.

=== International career statistics ===
As of match played 4 June 2025.

Cayman Islands national team
2023	2	0
2024	8	0
2025	1	0
Total	11	0
