= Brent Rahim =

Trinidad and Tobago footballer (born 1978)

Personal information
- Full name: Brent Dominic Rahim
- Date of birth: 8 August 1978 (age 48)
- Place of birth: Diego Martin, Trinidad and Tobago
- Height: 1.82 m (6 ft 0 in)
- Position: Midfielder

College career
Years	Team	Apps	(Gls)
1997–2000	UConn Huskies		

Senior career*
Years	Team	Apps	(Gls)
2001	Joe Public	13	(3)
2001–2003	Levski Sofia	14	(0)
2002	→ West Ham United (loan)	0	(0)
2003	→ Northampton Town (loan)	6	(1)
2003–2005	Falkirk	29	(0)
2005	IF Sylvia	10	(0)
2006	San Juan Jabloteh	16	(2)
Total		88	(6)

International career
2000–2005	Trinidad and Tobago	49	(3)
- * Club domestic league appearances and goals

Brent Dominic Rahim (born 8 August 1978) is a Trinidad and Tobago former professional footballer who played as a midfielder.

== Career ==
Rahim was born in Diego Martin. He played at the University of Connecticut, and was drafted to Los Angeles Galaxy in the 2001 MLS SuperDraft. He rejected the transfer and signed for Joe Public in his home country. He later played abroad, including a short spell in English club West Ham United where he was loaned to Northampton Town where he netted once against Queens Park Rangers in early 2003.

Rahim got 49 caps and scored 3 goals for the Trinidad and Tobago national team between 2000 and 2005. In May 2005 he was left out of the national team by new coach Leo Beenhakker, but he was called up as a standby player to the 2006 FIFA World Cup.

== Career statistics ==
=== International ===
Scores and results list Trinidad and Tobago's goal tally first, score column indicates score after each Rahim goal.

List of international goals scored by Brent Rahim
No.	Date	Venue	Opponent	Score	Result	Competition
1	15 May 2001	Larry Gomes Stadium, Malabar, Trindiad and Tobago	Barbados	5–0	5–0	2001 Caribbean Cup
2	17 May 2001	Hasely Crawford Stadium, Port of Spain, Trinidad and Tobago	Jamaica	2–1	2–1	2001 Caribbean Cup
3	25 May 2001	Hasely Crawford Stadium, Port of Spain, Trinidad and Tobago	Haiti	2–0	2–0	2001 Caribbean Cup
