= Trey Ebanks =

Caymanian footballer (born 2000)

Personal information
- Full name: Trey Kristopher Ebanks
- Date of birth: 5 June 2000 (age 26)
- Place of birth: Cayman Islands
- Position: Midfielder

Team information
- Current team: FC Oberneuland
- Number: 17

Senior career*
| Years | Team | Apps | (Gls) |
- Academy SC
| 2022 | Petrolul Potcoava | | |
| 2022 | Gloria Băneasa | | |
| 2023–2025 | Academy SC | | |
| 2025 | OSC Bremerhaven | 11 | (4) |
| 2025– | FC Oberneuland | 2 | (2) |

International career^{‡}
| 2018 | Cayman Islands U20 | 2 | (0) |
| 2019– | Cayman Islands | 17 | (0) |
- * Club domestic league appearances and goals as of 08:22, 21 August 2025 (UTC) ‡ National team caps and goals as of 08:22, 21 August 2025 (UTC)

Trey Kristopher Ebanks (born 5 June 2000) is a Caymanian footballer who plays as a midfielder for Bremen-Liga club FC Oberneuland and the Cayman Islands national team.

== Career ==
A former Caymanian youth international, Ebanks has represented Cayman Islands at 2018 CONCACAF U-20 Championship. He made his senior team debut on 16 October 2019 in a 1–0 CONCACAF Nations League win against Saint Martin. In February 2021, he was called up for World Cup qualifying matches against Suriname and Canada.

== Career statistics ==
=== International ===
As of match played 19 November 2024

Appearances and goals by national team and year
| National team | Year | Apps | Goals |
|---|---|---|---|
| Cayman Islands | 2019 | 2 | 0 |
| Cayman Islands | 2021 | 3 | 0 |
| Cayman Islands | 2022 | 3 | 0 |
| Cayman Islands | 2023 | 2 | 0 |
| Cayman Islands | 2024 | 7 | 0 |
| Total | | 17 | 0 |
