= Javaun Splatt =

British Virgin Islands footballer

Personal information
- Date of birth: 18 February 2001 (age 25)
- Place of birth: London, England
- Position: Forward

Team information
- Current team: Margate

Youth career
- –2018: Dulwich Hamlet
- 2018–2020: Derby County

Senior career*
Years	Team	Apps	(Gls)
2019–2020	Derby County	0	(0)
2019	→ Mickleover (loan)	2	(0)
2019–2020	→ Carshalton Athletic (loan)	4	(0)
2020	→ Barnsley (loan)	0	(0)
2020–2021	Tonbridge Angels	8	(0)
2021–2022	Whitehawk	37	(15)
2022	Worthing	12	(2)
2022–2023	Billericay Town	10	(0)
2023	Leatherhead	7	(1)
2023	Whitehawk	4	(2)
2023	Sittingbourne	8	(1)
2023–2024	Sheppey United	19	(6)
2024	Clitheroe	10	(4)
2024–2025	Hythe Town	21	(8)
2025–2026	Whitstable Town	29	(20)
2026–	Margate	0	(0)

International career^{‡}
2025–	British Virgin Islands	7	(5)
- * Club domestic league appearances and goals as of 21:10, 26 May 2026 (UTC) ‡ National team caps and goals as of 12:51, 27 March 2026 (UTC)

Javaun Splatt (born 18 February 2001) is a British Virgin Islands footballer who currently plays for Isthmian League South East Division club Margate, and the British Virgin Islands national team. With five international goals, he is tied with Avondale Williams as the national team's all-time top scorer.

== Club career ==
As a youth, Splatt came up through the youth system of Dulwich Hamlet. From there, he joined the academy of Derby County on a two-year scholarship deal in 2018. The following year, he made his senior debut on loans at Mickleover and Carshalton Athletic. In February 2020, Splatt went on a trial with EFL Championship club Barnsley which included a training match appearance against Sheffield Wednesday. He was then loaned from Derby County to the Barnsley's under-23 team. He was not offered a new contract when his deal with Derby County expired in summer 2020.

Following his departure from Derby County, Splatt signed for National League South club Tonbridge Angels in September 2020. After making over a dozen appearances for the Angels, the player joined Whitehawk in June 2021. He scored nineteen goals across all competitions for Whitehawk that season and earned a return to the National League South the following year, joining Worthing. He remained dual-registered with Whitehawk that season to gain more playing time after being cup-tied to the club earlier in the season. The forward made his full debut with Worthing on 27 February 2022, starting in a league match against Concord Rangers.

Following his departure from Worthing, Splatt had a two-month stint with Billericay Town before moving on to Leatherhead. After signing a deal with Ramsgate in summer 2022, he departed the club without ever playing a match after he received a more lucrative offer to return to Whitehawk FC where he had success the previous season. He made his first appearance after his return in a 2022–23 FA Trophy draw with Burgess Hill Town in October of that year.

In summer 2023, Splatt departed Whitehawk for the second time, subsequently having spells with Sittingbourne and Sheppey United. During his first season with Sheppey United, the player scored on his league home debut, an eventual 2–2 draw with Herne Bay. He then returned to Sheppey United the following season after finishing his first campaign with the club in top form.

In July 2024, Splatt joined Clitheroe of the Northern Premier League, despite being announced as a new signing for Bowers & Pitsea earlier that month. His performances for the club during the 24/25 season included a hat-trick in a 4–2 victory over Wythenshawe Town in August 2024. In December 2024, Splatt moved to Hythe Town as the club tried to boost its roster to avoid relegation from the Isthmian League South East Division. He made his league debut for the club on 8 December in a 0–3 loss to Three Bridges.

In June 2025, Splatt joined Southern Counties East Premier Division club Whitstable Town.

In May 2026, having helped Whitstable Town win the SCEFL Premier Division title, Splatt followed manager Jamie Coyle to Isthmian South East Division club Margate.

== International career ==
Born in London, Splatt was called up to the British Virgin Islands national team for a friendly against Saint Vincent and the Grenadines and 2026 FIFA World Cup qualification matches against Dominica and Jamaica in May 2025. He scored his first international goal on 12 November 2025 during the 2–1 win against Anguilla in the 2025–26 CONCACAF Series. Two days later, he scored a hat-trick in a 6–0 victory over the Bahamas.

== Personal ==
Splatt is the brother of Jamaica international Delano McCoy-Splatt.

== Career statistics ==
=== Club ===
As of end of 2025–26 season

Appearances and goals by club, season and competition
Club	Season	League			FA Cup		League Cup		Other		Total	
Club	Season	Division	Apps	Goals	Apps	Goals	Apps	Goals	Apps	Goals	Apps	Goals
Mickleover	2019–20	Northern Premier League	2	0	0	0	0	0	0	0	2	0
Carshalton Athletic	2019–20	IL Premier Division	4	0	0	0	0	0	1	0	5	0
Tonbridge Angels	2020–21	National League South	8	0	2	1	0	0	1	0	11	1
Whitehawk	2021–22	IL South East Division	37	15	3	2	0	0	3	0	43	17
Worthing	2022–23	National League South	12	2	0	0	0	0	1	0	13	2
Billericay Town	2022–23	IL Premier Division	10	0	0	0	0	0	1	0	11	0
Leatherhead	2022–23	IL South Central Division	7	1	0	0	0	0	1	0	8	1
Whitehawk	2022–23	IL South East Division	4	2	0	0	0	0	2	0	6	2
Sittingbourne	2023–24	IL South East Division	8	1	0	0	0	0	4	1	12	2
Sheppey United	2023–24	IL South East Division	18	6	0	0	0	0	0	0	18	6
Sheppey United	2024–25	IL South East Division	1	0	0	0	0	0	0	0	1	0
Clitheroe	2024–25	NPL West Division	10	4	2	0	0	0	3	0	16	4
Hythe Town	2024–25	IL South East Division	21	8	0	0	0	0	0	0	21	8
Whitstable Town	2025–26	SCEFL Premier Division	29	20	7	3	—		4 (Note: Appearance(s) in FA Vase)	4	40	27
Career total			171	59	14	6	0	0	21	5	206	70

=== International goals ===
Scores and results list the British Virgin Islands' goal tally first.

No.	Date	Venue	Opponent	Score	Result	Competition
1.	12 November 2025	Truman Bodden Sports Complex, George Town, Cayman Islands	Cayman Islands	1–1	2–1	2025–26 CONCACAF Series
2.	15 November 2025	Truman Bodden Sports Complex, George Town, Cayman Islands	Bahamas	1–0	6–0	2025–26 CONCACAF Series
3.	15 November 2025	Truman Bodden Sports Complex, George Town, Cayman Islands	Bahamas	2–0	6–0	2025–26 CONCACAF Series
4.	15 November 2025	Truman Bodden Sports Complex, George Town, Cayman Islands	Bahamas	4–0	6–0	2025–26 CONCACAF Series
5.	26 March 2026	Truman Bodden Sports Complex, George Town, Cayman Islands	Cayman Islands	1–1	1–1	2025–26 CONCACAF Series
Last updated 17 November 2025

=== International career statistics ===
As of match played 26 March 2026

British Virgin Islands
Year	Apps	Goals
2025	6	4
2026	1	1
Total	7	5

== Honours ==
Whitstable Town

- SCEFL Premier Division: 2025–26
