= Michael Martin (footballer, born 1998) =

Caymanian footballer

Personal information
- Full name: Michael Martin Cruz
- Date of birth: 31 January 1998 (age 28)
- Place of birth: West End, Cayman Islands
- Position: Midfielder

Senior career*
Years	Team	Apps	(Gls)
2014–2015	Cayman Brac		
2016–2017	Harbour View	13	(0)
2018–2020	Bodden Town		

International career^{‡}
2018–2020	Cayman Islands	13	(3)
- * Club domestic league appearances and goals as of 11 July 2020 ‡ National team caps and goals as of 11 July 2020

Michael Martin Cruz (born 31 January 1998) is a Caymanian footballer. Besides Cayman Islands, he has played in Jamaica. On 23 March 2020, Martin received a 10-year ban from the Cayman Islands Football Association for assaulting a referee following a 23 January match of the 2019–20 Premier League against Academy SC.

== Career statistics ==
=== Club ===
As of 25 January 2019.

Club	Season	League			Cup		Other		Total	
Club	Season	Division	Apps	Goals	Apps	Goals	Apps	Goals	Apps	Goals
Harbour View	2016–17	National Premier League	13	0	0	0	0	0	13	0
Career total			13	0	0	0	0	0	13	0

=== International ===
As of match played 19 November 2019.

National team	Year	Apps	Goals
Cayman Islands	2018	4	0
Cayman Islands	2019	9	3
Total		13	3

=== International goals ===
Scores and results list the Cayman Islands' goal tally first.

No.	Date	Venue	Opponent	Score	Result	Competition
1.	5 September 2019	Bethlehem Soccer Stadium, Saint Croix, U.S. Virgin Islands	U.S. Virgin Islands	1–0	2–0	2019–20 CONCACAF Nations League C
2.	5 September 2019	Bethlehem Soccer Stadium, Saint Croix, U.S. Virgin Islands	U.S. Virgin Islands	2–0	2–0	2019–20 CONCACAF Nations League C
3.	8 September 2019	Truman Bodden Sports Complex, George Town, Cayman Islands	Barbados	1–0	2–2	2019–20 CONCACAF Nations League C
