= Charles McLean (football coach) =

Caymanian football manager

Personal information
- Full name: Charles Elbert McLean
- Date of birth: 12 August 1959 (age 67)
- Place of birth: Cayman Islands

Team information
- Current team: Bodden Town FC

Managerial career
- Years: Team
- 201–: Bodden Town FC
- 2018: Cayman Islands

Charles Elbert McLean (born 12 August 1959) is a football coach from Cayman Islands. He was appointed as head coach of the Cayman Islands national team in September 2018. He departed the position in December 2018.
