= Calvin Jefford =

Caymanian footballer

Personal information
- Full name: Calvin Rene Jefford
- Date of birth: 16 February 1987 (age 39)
- Place of birth: Cayman Islands
- Height: 6 ft 0 in (1.83 m)
- Position: Forward

Senior career*
Years	Team	Apps	(Gls)
2007–	Elite SC	128	(253)
Total		550+	(500+)

International career^{‡}
2008–2011	Cayman Islands	9	(4)
Medal record
1
- * Club domestic league appearances and goals ‡ National team caps and goals as of 06:46, 11 April 2012 (UTC)

Calvin Jefford (born 16 February 1987) is a Caymanian former footballer who played as a forward for Elite SC. He represented the Cayman Islands during the 2008 world cup qualifying match. He was also in multiple tournaments and won several medals. Jefford beat his personal record for the most goals in Cayman's history.
