= Charles Fraser MacLean =

American jurist (1841–1924)

Charles Fraser MacLean (November 21, 1841 – March 20, 1924) was an American jurist.

Born in New Hartford, New York, he began attending Yale University as a junior in 1862. He graduated in 1864 and was a member of Skull and Bones. In 1866, he was the first person to be awarded a PhD in philosophy from an American institution. His dissertation was A Critique of John Stuart Mill's Examination of Hamilton's Philosophy. In 1869 he earned his JUD at the University of Berlin. His dissertation was De Jure Emigrandi.

During the Franco-Prussian War, MacLean was a war correspondent for the New York World. He accompanied U.S. military observer General Philip Sheridan and acted as his interpreter. He was one of the first non-combatants to enter Paris following the surrender of the French and witnessed the signing of the Treaty of Versailles. He recounted the Battle of Sedan and the capture of Napoleon III in his "The Surrender of an Emperor", published in The Second Book of the Authors Club: Liber Scriptorum (1921). He also interviewed Otto von Bismarck, Patrice de Mac-Mahon, Duke of Magenta, Adolphe Thiers, and Léon Gambetta.

After a brief stint in St. Petersburg for The Times, he returned to the US to practice law. He entered the law office of Samuel J. Tilden, who was related to his mother, and would practice law in New York City most of the rest of his life. He lectured on law at Columbia University (1873–4) and New York University (1885–97). He served on the Board of Police Commissioners variously as counsel, a member, and president and served in various other city office and boards. He was elected to be a judge on the New York Supreme Court and served for fourteen years (1895–1909).

In 1887, he married Marie Mott (1854?–1946), daughter of industrialist Jordan L. Mott.
