= Garth Anderson =

Caymanian footballer

Personal information
- Full name: Garth Anderson
- Date of birth: 12 March 1976 (age 50)
- Place of birth: Cayman Islands
- Position: Midfielder

Senior career*
Years	Team	Apps	(Gls)
1991–1996	PC Strikers		
1996–2015	George Town		

International career
1999–2008	Cayman Islands	20	(2)
- * Club domestic league appearances and goals

Garth Anderson (born 12 March 1976) is a Caymanian footballer who plays as a midfielder. He has represented the Cayman Islands during World Cup qualifying matches in 2004 and 2008.
