= Lee Ramoon =

Caymanian footballer

Personal information
- Date of birth: 29 January 1965 (age 61)
- Place of birth: Cayman Islands

College career
Years	Team	Apps	(Gls)
1984–1987	King College Tornado		

Senior career*
Years	Team	Apps	(Gls)
1988–1989	Stockport County	0	(0)
1990–1994	PC Strikers		
1994–1995	Altrincham	2	(1)
1994	→ Winsford United (loan)	3	(0)
1995	→ Burscough (loan)	1	(0)
1995	→ Porthmadog (loan)	5	(2)
1996–2010	George Town SC		

International career
1991–2002	Cayman Islands	15	(10)

Managerial career
- 2012–: George Town SC
- * Club domestic league appearances and goals

Lee Ramoon (born 29 January 1965) is a former international footballer from the Cayman Islands.

== Career ==
=== Club career ===
Ramoon played college soccer in the United States at King College. In 1988, Ramoon went to England and signed with Stockport County, making a number of appearances for their reserve team, and scoring a goal against Everton's Reserves on 9 September 1988. He had a second spell in the UK in 1994–95, making two substitute appearances (scoring once) in the English Football Conference. Ramoon spent spells at Winsford United (November 1994), Burscough and Welsh club Porthmadog (February 1995), all on loan from Altrincham. Ramoon later returned to Cayman to play with George Town, winning three League titles and four Cups in five years.

=== International career ===
Ramoon made his first (unofficial) appearance for the Cayman Islands national team in 1979, at the age of 14, and made over 200 official and unofficial international appearances. Ramoon also captained the national team on numerous occasions.

=== International goals ===
Scores and results list the Cayman Islands' goal tally first.

No.	Date	Venue	Opponent	Score	Result	Competition
1.	26 May 1991	Independence Park, Kingston, Jamaica	Jamaica	1–1	2–3	1991 Caribbean Cup qualification
2.	14 November 1993	Trabuco Hills High School Stadium, Mission Viejo, California, United States	United States	1–5	1–8	Friendly
3.	6 March 1994	Ed Bush Stadium, West Bay, Cayman Islands	Jamaica	1–0	3–2	1994 Caribbean Cup qualification
4.	6 March 1994	Ed Bush Stadium, West Bay, Cayman Islands	Jamaica	2–1	3–2	1994 Caribbean Cup qualification
5.	21 July 1995	Truman Bodden Sports Complex, George Town, Cayman Islands	Antigua and Barbuda	1–0	2–0	1996 Caribbean Cup
6.	21 July 1995	Truman Bodden Sports Complex, George Town, Cayman Islands	Antigua and Barbuda	2–0	2–0	1996 Caribbean Cup
7.	28 July 1995	Truman Bodden Sports Complex, George Town, Cayman Islands	Trinidad and Tobago	2–9	2–9	1996 Caribbean Cup
8.	10 May 1998	Truman Bodden Sports Complex, George Town, Cayman Islands	Bermuda	1–0	2–0	1998 Caribbean Cup qualification
9.	10 May 1998	Truman Bodden Sports Complex, George Town, Cayman Islands	Bermuda	2–0	2–0	1998 Caribbean Cup qualification
10.	26 July 1998	Saint Thomas, Jamaica	Netherlands Antilles	2–0	2–0	1998 Caribbean Cup
11.	8 April 2001	Stade Pierre-Aliker, Fort-de-France, Martinique	Martinique	1–0	1–1	2001 Caribbean Cup qualification

== Honours ==
Ramoon was awarded the FIFA Order of Merit for the year 2004.
