= Harvey Limón =

Surinamese footballer

Personal information
- Date of birth: July 21, 1975 (age 51)
- Place of birth: Suriname
- Position: Midfielder

Senior career*
Years	Team	Apps	(Gls)
2000–01	SV Leo Victor	0	(0)
2001–03	Groene Ster Heerlerheide	0	(0)
2003–04	SV Leo Victor	0	(0)
2004–present	Groene Ster Heerlerheide	0	(0)

International career
1996–2001	Suriname	6	(1)
- * Club domestic league appearances and goals

Harvey Limón (born July 21, 1975) is a Surinamese professional footballer who plays as midfielder for Groene Ster Heerlerheide
