= Elijah Seymour =

Caymanian footballer

Personal information
- Full name: Elijah Gregory Seymour
- Date of birth: 5 November 1998 (age 27)
- Place of birth: George Town, Cayman Islands
- Height: 1.78 m (5 ft 10 in)
- Position: Midfielder

Team information
- Current team: Newington
- Number: 31

Youth career
- Barnet

Senior career*
Years	Team	Apps	(Gls)
2016–2017	Cockfosters		
2017–2018	Wingate & Finchley		
2018–2019	União Madeira	2	(0)
2019–2020	Voluntari II		
2020–2021	Tunari		
2021–2022	Dunărea Călărași	7	(0)
2022	Slatina	2	(0)
2023	Electric City FC	19	(2)
2024	Master's FA	7	(1)
2024–2025	Newington	11	(1)

International career^{‡}
2019–	Cayman Islands	11	(2)
- * Club domestic league appearances and goals as of 13:55, 14 November 2025 (UTC) ‡ National team caps and goals as of 4 September 2024

Elijah Gregory Seymour (born 5 November 1998) is a Caymanian footballer who plays as a midfielder for Newington and the Cayman Islands national team.

== Club career ==
At the age of 15, Seymour joined the youth academy of English fifth division side Barnet. In 2016, he signed for Cockfosters in the English ninth division. In 2017, he signed for English seventh division club Wingate & Finchley. In 2018, Seymour signed for União da Madeira in Portugal. In 2019, he signed for Romanian third division team Voluntari II, where he said, "Romanian football is very different from the one we used to play in Portugal. In Portugal it was more of a technical skill. Here, where I play, in League 3 for now, there is more intensity and the very important physical factor. There is less emphasis on technical capacity." In 2021, Seymour signed for Dunărea Călărași in the Romanian second division. In 2023, he joined Canadian club Electric City FC in League1 Ontario.

== International career ==
Seymour made his senior international debut for the Cayman Islands on 31 May 2019 in a friendly against Cuba.

== Career statistics ==
Scores and results list the Cayman Islands's goal tally first.

No	Date	Venue	Opponent	Score	Result	Competition
1.	17 October 2023	Truman Bodden Sports Complex, George Town, Cayman Islands	U.S. Virgin Islands	1–0	2–1	2023–24 CONCACAF Nations League C
2.	4 September 2024	Truman Bodden Sports Complex, George Town, Cayman Islands	British Virgin Islands	1–0	1–0	2024–25 CONCACAF Nations League C
Last updated 4 September 2024

== Honours ==
CSM Slatina

- Liga III: 2021–22
