= Cayman Islands national football team =

Men's association football team

Cayman Islands
- Association: Cayman Islands Football Association (CIFA)
- Confederation: CONCACAF (North America)
- Sub-confederation: CFU (Caribbean)
- Head coach: Colin ‘Dougie’ Rowe
- Captain: D'Andre Rowe
- Most caps: Jabari Campbell (26)
- Top scorer: Lee Ramoon (12)
- Home stadium: Truman Bodden Sports Complex
- FIFA code: CAY
First colours	Second colours

FIFA ranking
- Current: 198 ▼1 (7 October 2026)
- Highest: 127 (November 1995)
- Lowest: 206 (April 2019)

First international
- Dominica 2–1 Cayman Islands (Roseau, Dominica; 3 March 1985)

Biggest win
- Cayman Islands 5–0 British Virgin Islands (Grand Cayman, Cayman Islands; 2 March 1994); Cayman Islands 5–0 Sint Maarten (Grand Cayman, Cayman Islands; 4 March 1994)

Biggest defeat
- Cayman Islands 0–11 Canada (Bradenton, United States; 29 March 2021)

Caribbean Cup
- Appearances: 4 (first in 1991)
- Best result: 4th place (1995)

The Cayman Islands national football team represents the Cayman Islands, a British overseas territory in men's international football, and is governed by the Cayman Islands Football Association, the governing body for football in the Cayman Islands founded in 1966. It has been a full member of FIFA and CONCACAF since 1992, and is also a member of CFU in the Caribbean Zone.

The Cayman Islands has never qualified for the FIFA World Cup and the CONCACAF Gold Cup, but has participated four times in League C and once in League B of the CONCACAF Nations League. In subcontinental competitions, the team finished as fourth place in the 1995 Caribbean Cup.

The Cayman Islands' debut in international competitions was in the 1985 CFU Championship qualifying tournament, and its first appearance in World Cup qualifiers was for 1998 qualification. The team's first victory was in 1990 by defeating Aruba 2–1 in the Caribbean Cup qualifying tournament.

== History ==
=== 1985–2000 ===
The Caymanian football team played its first international match on 3 March 1985, against Dominica, in Roseau, as part of the 1985 CFU Championship. They lost that match 2–1 with Lee Ramoon - who would go on to become the team's top scorer - opening the scoring.

They qualified for the 1991 Caribbean Cup, falling in the first round. They returned to the tournament in 1994, suffering the same fate. However, the following year, the Cayman Islands jointly organized with Jamaica the 1995 Caribbean Cup, reaching the semi-finals. It fell to Trinidad and Tobago by a scandalous 2–9. In the match for 3rd place, they were defeated by Cuba 0–3. They would qualify again in 1998 although they failed to get past the group stage. They have not played a Caribbean Cup final phase since then.

The Cayman Islands participated in their first World Cup qualifying tie in 1998 where they succumbed in the first round at the hands of Cuba, who eliminated them after winning twice 0–1 and 0–5.

=== 2000–2010 ===
In 2000, given the status of the Cayman Islands as one of the British overseas territories, the national team attempted to use this as a loophole to call up several uncapped players possessing British passports but who had no specific links to the islands. Barry McIntosh, a football agent, was called in to scout players for an upcoming FIFA World Cup qualifier against Cuba and ultimately he secured eight players i.e. Wayne Allison (Tranmere Rovers), Ged Brannan (Motherwell), David Barnett (Lincoln City), Martin O'Connor (Birmingham City), Dwayne Plummer (Bristol City), Barry Hayles (Fulham), Neville Roach (Southend United) and Neil Sharpe (Boreham Wood). Except Allison the players all appeared in a 5–0 friendly defeat against D.C. United but before they could appear in any official internationals FIFA stepped in and barred the players from representing the Cayman Islands due to their failure to satisfy the existing rules for national team eligibility. Of the eight players only Hayles went on to play international football, appearing for Jamaica ten times.

In the first round of the 2002 qualifiers, the Cayman Islands was once again eliminated by Cuba, winning 4–0 in Havana and drawing 0–0 in George Town. History repeated itself four years later, in the 2006 qualifiers, since the Cubans eliminated the Caymanian team from the World Cup for the third time in a row (1–2 in George Town and 4–0 in Havana).

Things didn't change significantly for the 2010 qualifiers, only this time it was Bermuda that eliminated the Cayman Islands in the first round, 4–2 on aggregate. Regardless, this tie saw the Caymanians earn their first points away from home, earning a 1–1 draw at Hamilton on 3 February 2008, with Allean Grant scoring in the 87th minute.

=== 2010–present ===
Qualifying directly into the second round of the 2014 qualifiers, the Cayman Islands were drawn in group A along with their peers from El Salvador, the Dominican Republic and Suriname. They lost 5 games out of 6, rescuing a 1–1 draw on the last day, on 14 November 2011, against the Dominicans. The Caymanian team did not play any match again in the next few years, since declining their participation in the 2012 and 2014 Caribbean Cups. But they returned to the 2018 qualifiers, facing Belize in the first round. The first leg in Belmopan finished 0–0 and the second leg in George Town finished 1–1. The 1–1 aggregate score meant the Cayman Islands were eliminated on the away goal rule. With this unbeaten elimination, Cayman Islands can say that they are one of the few teams in the world that did not qualify for a FIFA World Cup despite not losing a single match.

On 6 June 2026 against Gibraltar teams, Christopher Reeves scored the fastest goals in Cayman Islands history the goal timed is 37 seconds, and 2nd fastest goals against Gibraltar teams behind Christian Benteke goals timed 8.1 seconds

== Results and fixtures ==
The following is a list of match results in the last 12 months, as well as any future matches that have been scheduled.

Win Draw Loss Fixture

=== 2025 ===
12 November 2025–26 CONCACAF Series	Cayman Islands	1–2	British Virgin Islands	George Town, Cayman Islands
19:00 UTC−5	Seymour 38'	Report	Bonilla 62' (o.g.); Splatt 81' (pen.)	Stadium: Truman Bodden Sports Complex; Referee: Kimbell Ward (Saint Kitts and Nevis)

15 November 2025–26 CONCACAF Series	Cayman Islands	4–0	Anguilla	George Town, Cayman Islands
19:00 UTC−5	Studenhofft 16' (pen.), 58'; Scott 28'; O. Ebanks 84'	Report		Stadium: Truman Bodden Sports Complex; Referee: Amaury Majors (Bermuda)

=== 2026 ===
26 March 2025–26 CONCACAF Series	Cayman Islands	1–1	British Virgin Islands	George Town, Cayman Islands
19:00 UTC−5	Silburn 7'	Report	Splatt 20'	Stadium: Truman Bodden Sports Complex; Referee: Alexi Perry (Jamaica)

29 March 2025–26 CONCACAF Series	Cayman Islands	1–0	Bahamas	George Town, Cayman Islands
19:00 UTC−5	Kelly 59' (o.g.)	Report		Stadium: Truman Bodden Sports Complex; Referee: Tristley Bassue (St. Kitts and Nevis)

6 June 2026 Friendly	Gibraltar	4–1	Cayman Islands	Europa Point, Gibraltar
19:00 UTC+1	J. Scanlon 12'; Borge 49'; Valarino 57'; De Barr 59'	Report (UEFA); Report (FIFA)	Reeves 1'	Stadium: Europa Point Stadium; Attendance: 779; Referee: Antoine Chiaramonti (Andorra)

24 September 2026 Nations League B	Cayman Islands	0–0	Dominica	Roseau, Dominica
20:00 UTC−4		Report		Stadium: Windsor Park; Referee: Sanchez Bass (St. Kitts and Nevis)

27 September 2026 Nations League B	Guyana	2–0	Cayman Islands	Roseau, Dominica
15:00 UTC−4	Gordon 15'; De Rosario 36'	Report		Stadium: Windsor Park; Attendance: 200; Referee: Kimbell Ward (St. Kitts and Nevis)

1 October 2026 Nations League B	Cayman Islands	0–3	Puerto Rico	Mayagüez, Puerto Rico
20:00 UTC−4		Report	R. Rivera 26'; W. Rivera 45'; Antonetti 90+3' (pen.)	Stadium: Mayagüez Athletics Stadium; Attendance: 1,565; Referee: Benjamín Pineda (Costa Rica)

4 October 2026 Nations League B	Puerto Rico	1–0	Cayman Islands	Mayagüez, Puerto Rico
18:00 UTC−4	de León 64'	Report		Stadium: Mayagüez Athletics Stadium; Attendance: 1,755; Referee: Julio Luna (Guatemala)

12 November Nations League B	Cayman Islands	v	Guyana	Georgetown, Guyana
				Stadium: Synthetic Track and Field Facility

17 November Nations League B	Dominica	v	Cayman Islands	Georgetown, Guyana
				Stadium: Synthetic Track and Field Facility

== Coaching history ==
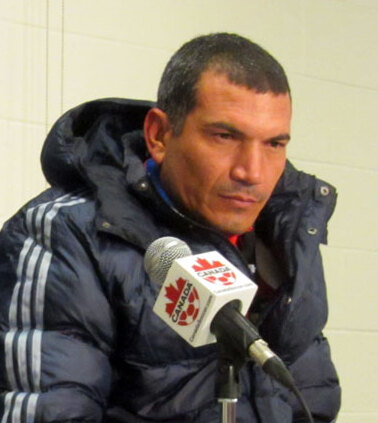
Chandler González is a former manager of the Cayman Islands

- (Brazil) Neider dos Santos (1993–1996)
- (England) Ken Fogarty (1996–1999)
- (Brazil) Márcio Máximo (2000–2001)
- (Brazil) Marcos Tinoco (2001–2005)
- (Jamaica) Carl Brown (2006–2011)
- (Cayman Islands) David Braham (2011–2015)
- (Cuba) Chandler González (2015–2018)
- (Cayman Islands) Charles McLean (2018)
- (Cuba) Chandler González (2018–2019)
- (England) Benjamin Pugh (2019–2021)
- (Portugal) Cláudio Garcia (2023–2024)
- (Netherlands) Joey Jap Tjong (2024–2025)
- (Cayman Islands) Colin Rowe (2025–present)

== Players ==
=== Current squad ===
The following players were called up for the friendly against Gibraltar on 6 June 2026.

Caps and goals correct as of 6 June 2026, after the match against Gibraltar

No.	Pos.	Player	Date of birth (age)	Caps	Goals	Club
1	GK	Lachlin Lambert	14 June 2006 (age 20)	12	0	(Croatian Football Federation) NK Dugopolje
12	GK	Deshawn Whittaker	31 May 2006 (age 20)	2	0	(Cayman Islands Football Association) Scholars International
6	DF	Wesley Robinson	7 September 1993 (age 33)	23	0	(Cayman Islands Football Association) Elite SC
23	DF	Jabari Campbell	23 June 2000 (age 26)	23	0	(United States Soccer Federation) Utah Avalanche
3	DF	D'Andre Rowe	5 January 2001 (age 25)	21	0	(Cayman Islands Football Association) Scholars International
5	DF	Cameron Gray	22 October 1998 (age 28)	18	1	(Cayman Islands Football Association) Academy SC
2	DF	Jah Dain Alexander	8 December 1999 (age 26)	16	0	(Cayman Islands Football Association) Elite
18	DF	Joshwa Campbell	15 February 2006 (age 20)	10	1	(United States Soccer Federation) UAB Blazers
14	DF	Kareem Foster	6 September 2000 (age 26)	5	0	(The Football Association) Sheerwater
11	MF	Trey Ebanks	5 June 2000 (age 26)	19	0	(German Football Association) FC Oberneuland
10	MF	Zachary Scott	2 April 1998 (age 28)	16	2	(Cayman Islands Football Association) Academy SC
8	MF	Jordan Bonilla	28 February 1997 (age 29)	14	0	(Cayman Islands Football Association) Scholars International
15	MF	Shakurn Silburn	12 August 1999 (age 27)	7	1	(Cayman Islands Football Association) Elite SC
7	FW	Elijah Seymour	5 November 1998 (age 28)	18	3	(Irish Football Association) Newington
9	FW	Christopher Reeves	27 February 1997 (age 29)	17	2	(Cayman Islands Football Association) Elite SC
21	FW	Jacobbi Tugman	3 October 2004 (age 22)	11	0	(German Football Association) SV Hemelingen
16	FW	Gonzalo McLaughlin	15 June 2000 (age 26)	4	0	(Cayman Islands Football Association) Tigers FC

=== Recent call-ups ===
Pos.	Player	Date of birth (age)	Caps	Goals	Club	Latest call-up
GK	Ramon Sealy	22 April 1991 (age 35)	13	0	(Cayman Islands) Bodden Town	v. Bahamas; 30 March 2026
GK	Kevin Matos-Ebanks	17 January 2007 (age 19)	1	0	Unknown	v. Bahamas; 30 March 2026
GK	Jayden Downey	11 April 2000 (age 26)	0	0	(Cayman Islands) Academy SC	v. Bahamas; 30 March 2026
MF	Matthew Suberan	3 February 1995 (age 31)	18	0	(Cayman Islands) Scholars International	v. Bahamas; 30 March 2026
MF	Dimetri Douglas	5 February 2000 (age 26)	2	1	(Cayman Islands) 345 FC	v. Bahamas; 30 March 2026
MF	Owen Ebanks	2 December 1999 (age 26)	1	1	(Cayman Islands) Scholars International	v. Bahamas; 30 March 2026
MF	Calyb Fredricks	15 August 2007 (age 19)	1	0	(Cayman Islands) Future SC	v. Bahamas; 30 March 2026
FW	Anton Nelson	31 July 1997 (age 29)	6	0	(Canada) Master's FA	v. Bahamas; 30 March 2026
FW	Kameron Mendez	9 February 2001 (age 25)	2	0	(Cayman Islands) Scholars International	v. Bahamas; 30 March 2026
FW	Gunnar Studenhofft	5 April 2002 (age 24)	7	4	(United States) Phoenix Rising	v. Anguilla; 15 November 2025
INJ = Withdrew due to injury; PRE = Preliminary squad; TRA = Training player; WD = Withdrew (non-injury); RET = Retired

== Player records ==
As of 12 July 2026
Players in bold are still active with Cayman Islands.

=== Most appearances ===
Rank	Player	Caps	Goals	Period
1	**Jabari Campbell**	26	0	2019–present
1	**Wesley Robinson**	23	0	2015–present
3	Mark Ebanks	21	7	2010–2023
4	**D'Andre Rowe**	20	0	2019–present
5	**Trey Ebanks**	19	0	2019–present
6	Ian Lindo	18	1	2001–2011
6	**Matthew Suberan**	18	0	2011–present
6	**Elijah Seymour**	18	3	2019–Present
9	Theron Wood	17	1	2008–2021
9	Joshewa Frederick-Charlery	17	0	2015–2023
9	Garth Anderson	17	2	1999–2008
9	**Christopher Reeves**	17	2	2018–Present

=== Top goalscorers ===
Rank	Player	Goals	Caps	Ratio	Period
1	Lee Ramoon	12	15	0.67	1979–2002
2	Mark Ebanks	7	21	0.33	2010–2023
3	Erickson Brown-Morfy	5	16	0.31	1998–2009
4	**Gunnar Studenhofft**	4	7	0.57	2021–present
4	Jonah Ebanks	4	14	0.29	2018–2023
6	Michael Martin	3	8	0.38	2018–2020
6	Gary Whittaker	3	9	0.33	1993–2008
6	**Elijah Seymour**	3	18	0.17	2019–present
9	Carlos Welcome	2	4	0.5	1994–2004
9	Marshall Forbes	2	5	0.4	2002–2008
9	Anthony Ramoon	2	10	0.2	1993–2002
9	**Zachary Scott**	2	15	0.13	2022–present
9	**Christopher Reeves**	2	17	0.12	2018–Present
9	Garth Anderson	2	27	0.12	1999–2008

== Cayman Islands records and statistics ==
- Most consecutive failed qualification attempts FIFA World Cup: 8: 1998-present
- Longest winning streak: 2: (2 times)
  - from 5 September 2019 to 8 September 2019
  - from 15 October 2019 to 16 November 2019
- Longest losing streak: 10: from 11 October 2008 to 11 November 2011
- Longest unbeaten streak: 5: from 14 November 2011 to 8 September 2019
- Longest draw streak: 3: (2 times)
  - from 14 November 2011 to 29 March 2015
  - from 8 June 2021 to 6 June 2022
- Longest streak without a draw: 11: from 7 October 2008 to 11 November 2011
- Longest winless streak: 13: from 11 October 2008 to 29 March 2015
- Longest goalless streak: 449 minutes: from 6 June 2026 to present
- Most consecutive minutes without conceding a goal: 238 minute: from 12 October 2019 to 19 November 2019
- Longest goalless streak by both teams: 143 minutes: from 5 March 2000 to 3 February 2004
- Largest comeback to wins the match: 1: v Anguilla, 4 October 2010
- Largest blown lead to lose the match: 1: (4 times)
  - v Grenada, 15 October 2008
  - v Aruba, 2 June 2021
  - v British Virgin Islands, 12 November 2025
  - v Gibraltar, 6 June 2026
- Largest comeback to draw the match: 1: (6 times)
  - v British Virgin Islands, 4 April 2001
  - v Bermuda, 3 February 2008
  - v Antigua and Barbuda, 30 August 2008
  - v Dominican Republic, 14 November 2011
  - v British Virgin Islands, 3 June 2022
  - v U.S. Virgin Islands, 7 September 2023
- Largest blown lead to draw the match: 1: (5 times)
  - v Belize, 29 March 2015
  - v Bermuda, 8 June 2021
  - v British Virgin Islands, 6 June 2022
  - v Saint Kitts and Nevis, 15 October 2024
  - v British Virgin Islands, 26 March 2026
- Most meeting played: 15: v Cuba, 1996-2006
- Most appearances: 26: Jabari Campbell, from 15 October 2019 to present
- Most consecutive appearances: 19: Jabari Campbell, from 7 September 2023 to 6 June 2026
- Top goalscorer: 12: Lee Ramoon - 1991-2002
- Biggest win: 4: v Anguilla, 15 November 2025
- Biggest defeat: 11: v Canada, 29 March 2021
- Cayman Islands player sent off: (8 times)
  - Carson Fagan, Dominican Republic, 29 November 2002 (66th minute)
  - Lee Ramoon, Dominican Republic, 29 November 2002 (71st minute)
  - John Kelly, v Cuba, 22 February 2004 (72nd minute)
  - Junior Fisher, v Cuba, 27 March 2004 (37th minute)
  - Phillip Berry, v Bermuda, 24 November 2004 (78th minute)
  - Horace Nelson, v Saint Vincent and the Grenadines, 28 November 2004 (45th minute)
  - Miguel Pitta, v Suriname, 7 October 2011 (87th minute)
  - Jah Dain Alexander, v Aruba, 20 November 2023 (68th minute)
- Opponent player sent off: (4 times)
  - Serguei Prado, v Cuba, 19 March 2000 (46th minute)
  - Wilfried Dalmat, v Saint Martin, 15 October 2019 (82nd minute)
  - Jett Blaschka, v U.S. Virgin Islands, 7 September 2023 (90+4th minute)
  - Darryl Bäly, v Aruba, 11 September 2023 (85th minute)
- Most goals in a match: 4: v Anguilla, 15 November 2025
- Most goals in first half: 2: (2 times)
  - v British Virgin Islands, 10 May 1991
  - v Anguilla, 15 November 2025
- Most goals in second half: 3: (2 times)
  - v Saint Martin, 27 August 2008
  - v Anguilla, 4 October 2010
- Most goals conceded in a match: 11: v Canada, 29 March 2021
- Most goals conceded in first half: 6: v Canada, 29 March 2021
- Most goals conceded in second half: 5: v Canada, 29 March 2021
- Most goals by both teams in a match: 11: v Canada, 29 March 2021
- Most goals by both teams in first half: 6: v Canada, 29 March 2021
- Most goals by both teams in second half: 5: (4 times)
  - v USA, 14 November 1993
  - v Guadeloupe, 11 October 2008
  - v El Salvador, 6 September 2011
  - v Canada, 29 March 2021
- Fewest goals by both teams in a match: 0: (5 times)
  - v Jamaica, 6 February 2000
  - v Cuba, 19 March 2000
  - v Bermuda, 31 August 2008
  - v Belize, 25 March 2015
  - v Saint Lucia, 17 November 2018
  - v Dominica, 24 September 2026
- Most goals by a player in a match: 2: (7 times)
  - Lee Ramoon, v Aruba, 26 March 1990
  - Anthony Ramoon, v Guyana, 11 March 1993
  - Lee Ramoon, v Antigua and Barbuda, 21 July 1995
  - Erickson Brown-Morfy, v Grenada, 15 October 2008
  - Mark Ebanks, v Anguilla, 4 October 2010
  - Michael Martin, v U.S. Virgin Islands, 5 September 2019
  - Gunnar Studenhofft, v Anguilla, 15 November 2025
- Most goals by a player in first half: 1: (28 times): Last time: Christopher Reeves, v Gibraltar, 6 June 2026
- Most goals by a player in second half: 2: Michael Martin, v U.S. Virgin Islands, 5 September 2019
- Most goals by a opponent player in a match: 3: (6 times)
  - Trevor Thorne, v Barbados, 12 March 1993
  - Leonson Lewis, v Trinidad and Tobago, 28 July 1995
  - Lester Moré, v Cuba, 27 March 2004
  - Mickaël Antoine-Curier, v Guadeloupe, 11 October 2008
  - Yannick Bellechasse, v Saint Martin, 12 October 2019
  - Lucas Cavallini, v Canada, 29 March 2021
- Most goals by a opponent player in first half: 2: (5 times)
  - Dominic Kinnear, v USA, 14 November 1993
  - Ramón Ocaña, v Cuba, 6 September 2006
  - Devaun DeGraff, v Bermuda, 30 March 2008
  - Mickaël Antoine-Curier, v Guadeloupe, 11 October 2008
  - Tiquanny Williams, v Saint Kitts and Nevis, 7 September 2024
- Most goals by a opponent player in second half: 3: (2 times)
  - Yannick Bellechasse, v Saint Martin, 12 October 2019
  - Lucas Cavallini, v Canada, 29 March 2021
- Fastest goals:
  - 37 seconds: Christopher Reeves, v Gibraltar, 6 June 2026
  - 4 minutes and 6 seconds: Mark Ebanks, v Belize, 29 March 2015
  - 4 minutes and 25 seconds: Michael Martin, v Barbados, 8 September 2019
- Fastest goals conceded: 2nd minute: (3 times)
  - 1 minutes and 23 seconds: Rovien Ostiana, v Aruba, 11 September 2023
  - 1 minutes and 43 seconds: Ricardo Rivera, v Puerto Rico, 26 March 2023
  - 2nd minutes: Paul Davis, v Jamaica, 26 May 1991
- Latest goals: 90+5th minute: Michael Martin, v U.S. Virgin Islands, 5 September 2019
- Latest goals by a opponent: 90+9th minute: Joshwa Campbell, v Saint Kitts and Nevis, 15 October 2024 (Own goal)
- Fastest 2 goals scored: 5 minutes: v Barbados, 8 September 2019
- Fastest 2 goals scored to start the match: 22nd minute: v British Virgin Islands, 10 May 1991
- Fastest 2 goals conceded to start the match: 11th minute: v Jamaica, 5 November 2008
- Fastest 2 goals conceded: 1 minutes: v Canada, 29 March 2021
- Fastest 3 goals conceded: 3 minutes: v Canada, 29 March 2021

== Competitive record ==
=== FIFA World Cup ===
FIFA World Cup record										Qualification record					
Year	Round	Pos.	Pld	W	D	L	GF	GA	Squad	Pld	W	D	L	GF	GA
1930 to 1994	Not a FIFA member									Not a FIFA member					
(France) 1998	Did not qualify									2	0	0	2	0	6
(South Korea) (Japan) 2002	Did not qualify									2	0	1	1	0	4
(Germany) 2006	Did not qualify									2	0	0	2	1	5
(South Africa) 2010	Did not qualify									2	0	1	1	2	4
(Brazil) 2014	Did not qualify									6	0	1	5	2	15
(Russia) 2018	Did not qualify									2	0	2	0	1	1
(Qatar) 2022	Did not qualify									4	0	1	3	2	18
(Canada) (Mexico) (United States) 2026	Did not qualify									4	1	0	3	1	9
(Morocco) (Portugal) (Spain) 2030	To be determined									To be determined					
(Saudi Arabia) 2034	To be determined									To be determined					
Total	—	0/8	—							24	1	6	17	9	62

=== CONCACAF Gold Cup ===
CONCACAF Championship / Gold Cup record
Year	Round	Pos.	Pld	W	D	L	GF	GA	Squad
1963 to 1991	Not a CONCACAF member								
1993 and 1996	Did not qualify								
(United States) 1998	Withdrew								
2000 to 2011	Did not qualify								
2013 to 2017	Withdrew								
2019 to 2027	Did not qualify								
Total	—	0/13	—						

=== CONCACAF Nations League ===
CONCACAF Nations League record
League phase											Final phase									
Season	Div.	Group	Pos.	Pld	W	D	L	GF	GA	P/R	Finals	Round	Pos.	Pld	W	D	L	GF	GA	Squad
2019–20	A	A	3rd	6	4	0	2	7	8	Same position	(United States) 2021	Ineligible								
2022–23	A	D	12th	4	0	2	2	3	11	Same position	(United States) 2023	Ineligible								
2023–24	A	B	6th	4	1	1	2	6	10	Same position	(United States) 2024	Ineligible								
2024–25	A	C	5th	4	2	1	1	4	5	▲	(United States) 2025	Ineligible								
2026–27	A	To be determined									2027	Ineligible								
Total				18	7	4	7	20	34	—	Total	—								

CONCACAF Nations League history
First match	U.S. Virgin Islands 0–2 Cayman Islands (5 September 2019; Upper Bethlehem, United States Virgin Islands)
Biggest win	U.S. Virgin Islands 0–2 Cayman Islands (5 September 2019; Upper Bethlehem, United States Virgin Islands)
Biggest defeat	Puerto Rico 5–1 Cayman Islands (26 March 2023; Bayamón, Puerto Rico); Aruba 5–1 Cayman Islands (20 November 2023; Oranjestad, Aruba)
Best result	Promotion League B (2024–25)
Worst result	12th – League C (2022–23)

=== Caribbean Cup ===
CFU Championship / Caribbean Cup record									Qualification record					
Year	Round	Pos.	Pld	W	D	L	GF	GA	Pld	W	D	L	GF	GA
1978 to 1983	Not a CFU member								Not a CFU member					
(Barbados) 1985	Did not qualify								1	0	0	1	1	2
(Barbados) 1989	Did not participate								Did not participate					
(Trinidad and Tobago) 1990	Did not qualify								4	1	1	2	6	10
(Jamaica) 1991	Group stage	6th	2	0	0	2	3	5	2	1	1	0	3	2
(Trinidad and Tobago) 1992	Did not qualify								2	0	0	2	2	11
(Jamaica) 1993	Did not qualify								3	0	0	3	3	13
(Trinidad and Tobago) 1994	Group stage	7th	3	0	1	2	3	6	3	3	0	0	13	2
(Cayman Islands) (Jamaica) 1995	Fourth place	4th	5	2	1	2	7	14	Qualified as hosts					
(Trinidad and Tobago) 1996	Did not qualify								1	0	0	1	0	4
(Antigua and Barbuda) (Saint Kitts and Nevis) 1997	Withdrew								Withdrew					
(Trinidad and Tobago) (Jamaica) 1998	Group stage	6th	3	1	0	2	2	5	2	1	1	0	4	2
(Trinidad and Tobago) 1999	Did not qualify								3	1	0	2	6	9
(Trinidad and Tobago) 2001	Did not qualify								3	0	3	0	4	4
(Barbados) 2005	Did not qualify								3	1	0	2	2	6
(Trinidad and Tobago) 2007	Did not qualify								3	0	0	3	1	12
(Jamaica) 2008	Did not qualify								6	1	2	3	7	13
(Martinique) 2010	Did not qualify								3	1	1	1	5	4
2012 to 2017	Did not participate								Did not participate					
Total	Fourth place	4/14	13	3	2	8	15	30	38	10	9	19	56	92

== Head-to-head record ==
As of 4 October 2026 after match against Puerto Rico

Positive Record Neutral Record Negative Record

Opponent	Pld	W	D	L	GF	GA	GD
Anguilla	2	2	0	0	8	1	+7
Antigua and Barbuda	3	2	1	0	4	1	+3
Aruba	4	1	0	3	5	11	-6
Bahamas	3	2	0	1	9	4	+5
Barbados	3	1	0	2	4	11	−7
Belize	2	0	2	0	1	1	0
Bermuda	10	1	3	6	8	20	−12
British Virgin Islands	9	5	3	1	15	7	+8
Canada	1	0	0	1	0	11	−11
Cuba	15	0	3	12	4	46	−42
Dominica	2	0	1	1	1	2	−1
Dominican Republic	5	1	1	3	2	14	−12
El Salvador	2	0	0	2	1	8	−7
French Guiana	1	1	0	0	1	0	+1
Gibraltar	1	0	0	1	1	4	–3
Grenada	1	0	0	1	2	4	−2
Guadeloupe	3	0	0	3	1	14	−13
Guyana	3	0	0	3	3	7	−4
Haiti	2	0	0	2	2	4	−2
Honduras	1	0	0	1	0	1	−1
Jamaica	13	1	1	11	10	40	−30
Martinique	5	0	2	3	2	13	−11
Moldova	1	0	0	1	0	4	−4
Montserrat	1	0	0	1	1	2	−1
Netherlands Antilles	1	1	0	0	2	0	+2
Nicaragua	1	0	0	1	0	1	−1
Puerto Rico	6	0	0	6	1	18	−17
Saint Kitts and Nevis	3	0	2	2	3	6	–3
Saint Lucia	1	0	1	0	0	0	0
Saint Martin	6	2	1	3	8	12	−4
Saint Vincent and the Grenadines	3	0	2	1	3	7	−4
Sint Maarten	3	1	1	1	8	5	+3
Suriname	4	0	0	4	0	7	−7
Trinidad and Tobago	3	0	0	3	2	19	−17
Turks and Caicos Islands	2	1	0	1	3	2	+1
United States	1	0	0	1	1	8	−7
U.S. Virgin Islands	4	3	1	0	7	3	+4
Total	125	24	22	79	118	309	−191
