= Saint Lucia national football team results =

The Saint Lucia national football team represents Saint Lucia in international football under the control of the Saint Lucia Football Association (SLFA). Although a Saint Lucia representative team had played previously, the football association was founded in 1979. It became fully affiliated to CONCACAF in 1986 and joined FIFA two years later.

The following list contains all results of Saint Lucia's official matches since 1979.

== Official results ==
=== 2002 ===
14 July 2003 CONCACAF Gold Cup qualification	British Virgin Islands	1–3	Saint Lucia	Road Town, British Virgin Islands
	Michael Huggins 53'	Report	Valencius Joseph 15'; Jonathan McVane 40'; Jean-Marie Emerson 60'	Stadium: A. O. Shirley Recreation Ground

28 July 2003 CONCACAF Gold Cup qualification	Saint Lucia	8–1	British Virgin Islands	Vieux Fort, Saint Lucia
	Walter Benner 2'; Valencius Joseph 7'; Jonathan McVane 43'; Jean-Marie Emerson 52', 75'; Emerson Sheldon Mark 54'; Elijah Joseph 58'; Titus Elva 82'	Report	Peterson Azile 36'	Stadium: George Odlum Stadium

11 August Friendly	Saint Lucia	1–3	Jamaica	Vieux Fort, Saint Lucia
	Valencia Joseph 18'	Report	Roland Dean 73', 83'; Fabian Taylor 79'	Stadium: George Odlum Stadium

6 October Friendly	Barbados	3–2	Saint Lucia	Saint Michael, Barbados
	Walton Burrowes, Michael Forde 85'	Report	Valencia Joseph; Alvin Xavier 79'	Stadium: Barbados National Stadium

9 October Friendly	Martinique	4–0	Saint Lucia	Rivière-Pilote, Martinique
	Patrick Percin; Jose-Thierry Goron; Marcel Gibon (Pen.); Miguel Duragrin	Report		Stadium: Stade Alfred Marie-Jeanne

6 November Friendly	Saint Lucia	0–2	Martinique	Vieux Fort, Saint Lucia
		Report	????; ????	Stadium: George Odlum Stadium

8 November Friendly	Saint Lucia	2–1	Antigua and Barbuda	Vieux Fort, Saint Lucia
	????; ????	Report	????	Stadium: George Odlum Stadium

13 November 2003 CONCACAF Gold Cup qualification	Saint Kitts and Nevis	2–1	Saint Lucia	Macoya, Trinidad and Tobago
	George Isaac 38', 56'	Report	Francis Lastic 78'	Stadium: Marvin Lee Stadium

17 November 2003 CONCACAF Gold Cup qualification	Trinidad and Tobago	0–1	Saint Lucia	Macoya, Trinidad and Tobago
		Report	Jonathan McVane 54'	Stadium: Marvin Lee Stadium

=== 2003 ===
26 March 2003 CONCACAF Gold Cup qualification	Jamaica	5–0	Saint Lucia	Jamaica, Jamaica
	Andy Williams 9'; Fabian Taylor 11'; Cornel Chin-Sue 37'; Claude Davis 56'; Omar Daley 62'	Report		Stadium: Independence Park

28 March 2003 CONCACAF Gold Cup qualification	Haiti	1–2	Saint Lucia	Jamaica, Jamaica
	Turlien Romulus 73'	Report	Sheldon Emmanuel 45'; David Flavius 90'	Stadium: Independence Park

30 March 2003 CONCACAF Gold Cup qualification	Martinique	5–4	Saint Lucia	Jamaica, Jamaica
	José-Thierry Goron 45'; Yann Girier-Dufournier 64', 84'; Fabrice Reuperné 73'; Miguel Duragrin 89'	Report	Titus Elva 21'; Emerson Sheldon Mark 38'; Earl Jean 52'; Valencius Joseph 56'	Stadium: Independence Park

=== 2004 ===
18 January Friendly	Guadeloupe	2–0	Saint Lucia	Les Abymes, Guadeloupe
	????; ????	Report		Stadium: Stade René Serge Nabajoth

8 February Friendly	Saint Lucia	1–2	Saint Lucia	Castries, Saint Lucia
	????	Report	????; ????	Stadium: Mindoo Phillip Park

22 February 2006 FIFA World Cup qualification	British Virgin Islands	0–1	Saint Lucia	Road Town, British Virgin Islands
		Report	Titus Elva 55'	Stadium: A. O. Shirley Recreation Ground

21 March Friendly	Saint Vincent and the Grenadines	1–1	Saint Lucia	Kingstown, Saint Vincent and the Grenadines
	Wesley Charles 39'	Report	Titus Elva 15'	Stadium: Arnos Vale Stadium

28 March 2006 FIFA World Cup qualification	Saint Lucia	9–0	British Virgin Islands	Vieux Fort, Saint Lucia
	Sheldon Emmanuel 13' (pen.), 66'; Elijah Joseph 26'; Earl Jean 28', 52'; Jarvin Skeete 49', 55'; Titus Elva 69'; Andy Baptiste 90'	Report		Stadium: George Odlum Stadium

2 June Friendly	Grenada	2–0	Saint Lucia	St. George's, Grenada
	Jason Roberts 7'; Kithson Bain 65'	Report		Stadium: Tanteen Recreation Ground

13 June 2006 FIFA World Cup qualification	Panama	4–0	Saint Lucia	Panama City, Panama
	Julio Dely Valdés 5'; Luis Tejada 18'; Ricardo Phillips 39'; Roberto Brown 75'	Report		Stadium: Estadio Rommel Fernández

20 June 2006 FIFA World Cup qualification	Saint Lucia	0–3	Panama	Vieux Fort, Saint Lucia
		Report	Luis Tejada 14'; Julio Dely Valdés 88'; Alberto Blanco 89'	Stadium: George Odlum Stadium

17 October Friendly	Saint Lucia	3–1	Grenada	Castries, Saint Lucia
	Levi Gilbert,,	Report	????	Stadium: Mindoo Phillip Park

2 November 2005 Caribbean Cup qualification	Saint Kitts and Nevis	1–1	Saint Lucia	Basseterre, Saint Kitts and Nevis
	Jevon Francis 14'	Report	Levi Gilbert 67'	Stadium: Warner Park Sporting Complex

4 November 2005 Caribbean Cup qualification	Montserrat	0–3	Saint Lucia	Basseterre, Saint Kitts and Nevis
		Report	????; ????; ????	Stadium: Warner Park Sporting Complex

6 November 2005 Caribbean Cup qualification	Antigua and Barbuda	1–2	Saint Lucia	Basseterre, Saint Kitts and Nevis
	George Dublin 65'	Report	Titus Elva 22'; Levi Gilbert 27'	Stadium: Warner Park Sporting Complex

12 December 2005 Caribbean Cup qualification	Saint Lucia	1–1	Jamaica	Vieux Fort, Saint Lucia
	Elijah Joseph 23'	Report	Akeem Priestley 42'	Stadium: George Odlum Stadium

19 December 2005 Caribbean Cup qualification	Jamaica	2–1	Saint Lucia	Kingston, Jamaica
	Roland Dean 1'; Jermaine Hue 67'	Report	Titus Elva 23'	Stadium: Independence Park

=== 2006 ===
20 May Friendly	Guadeloupe	2–1	Saint Lucia	Les Abymes, Guadeloupe
	Laurent Farnabe; Gerald Gavarin	Report	????	Stadium: Stade René Serge Nabajoth

28 July Friendly	Guyana	3–2	Saint Lucia	Linden, Guyana
	Randolph Jerome 20'; Neil Hernandez 29'; Kayode McKinnon 90'	Report	Titus Elva 62'; Levi Gilbert 70'	Stadium: Mackenzie Sports Club Ground

30 July Friendly	Guyana	2–0	Saint Lucia	Georgetown, Guyana
	Charles Pollard 74'; Nigel Codrington 80' (pen.)	Report		Stadium: Bourda

27 September 2007 Caribbean Cup qualification	Jamaica	4–0	Saint Lucia	Kingston, Jamaica
	Wilfred Smith 3'; Kevin Lamey 22', 36'; Demar Phillips 30'	Report		Stadium: Independence Park

29 September 2007 Caribbean Cup qualification	Haiti	7–1	Saint Lucia	Kingston, Jamaica
	Jean Jacques Jamil 4', 13'; Jean Baptiste Fritzson 17', 82'; Mones Chery 42'; Fabrice Noël 63'; Josue Mayard 80'	Report		Stadium: Independence Park

1 October 2007 Caribbean Cup qualification	Saint Vincent and the Grenadines	8–0	Saint Lucia	Kingston, Jamaica
	Andrew Douglas 11'; Shandel Samuel 25', 42', 56', 76', 90+3'; Wesley John 52'; Renson Haynes 84'	Report		Stadium: Independence Park

=== 2008 ===
6 February 2010 FIFA World Cup qualification	Turks and Caicos Islands	2–1	Saint Lucia	Providenciales, Turks and Caicos Islands
	David Lowery 31'; Gavin Glinton 74'	Report	Gilbert Nyhime 90+2'	Stadium: TCIFA National Academy

26 March 2010 FIFA World Cup qualification	Saint Lucia	2–0	Turks and Caicos Islands	Vieux Fort, Saint Lucia
	Kenwin McPhee 28'; Titus Elva 85'	Report		Stadium: George Odlum Stadium

18 May Friendly	Antigua and Barbuda	5–1	Saint Lucia	St. John's, Antigua and Barbuda
	Kerry Skepple 30'; Randolph Burton, 45'; Teran Williams; Stefan Smith	Report	Barnett Bledman	Stadium: Antigua Recreation Ground

14 June 2010 FIFA World Cup qualification	Guatemala	6–0	Saint Lucia	Guatemala City, Guatemala
	Mario Rafael Rodríguez 6'; Carlos Ruiz 36', 40', 58', 90+3'; Abner Trigueros 90+1'	Report		Stadium: Estadio Mateo Flores

21 June 2010 FIFA World Cup qualification	Guatemala	3–1	Saint Lucia	Los Angeles, United States
	Gonzalo Romero 24', 43'; Abner Trigueros 86'	Report	Kenwin McPhee 45'	Stadium: Los Angeles Memorial Coliseum

=== 2010 ===
26 August Friendly	Saint Lucia	1–3	Martinique	Vieux Fort, Saint Lucia
	Troy Prospere 37' (pen.)	Report	Steeve Gustan, Rodrigue Audel	Stadium: George Odlum Stadium

28 August Friendly	Saint Lucia	1–1	Martinique	Vieux Fort, Saint Lucia
	Jamil Joseph pen.'	Report	Kevin Parsemain	Stadium: George Odlum Stadium

10 September Friendly	Saint Lucia	1–5	Saint Vincent and the Grenadines	Vieux Fort, Saint Lucia
	Cliff Valcin 10'	Report	Norrel George 19'; Wendell Cuffy 72'; Myron Samuel, Romano Snagg	Stadium: George Odlum Stadium

21 September Friendly	Trinidad and Tobago	3–0	Saint Lucia	St. John's, Antigua and Barbuda
	Devorn Jorsling 22'; Yamal Gay 53'; Hughtun Hector 86'	Report		Stadium: Antigua Recreation Ground

23 September Friendly	Antigua and Barbuda	5–0	Saint Lucia	St. John's, Antigua and Barbuda
	Jamie Thomas 75'; Randolph Burton 17', 55'; Peter Byers 45', 67'	Report		Stadium: Antigua Recreation Ground

13 October 2010 Caribbean Cup qualification	Guyana	1–0	Saint Lucia	Paramaribo, Suriname
	Chris Bourne 9'	Report		Stadium: André Kamperveen Stadion

15 October 2010 Caribbean Cup qualification	Suriname	2–1	Saint Lucia	Paramaribo, Suriname
	Stefano Rijssel 14'; Ives Vlijter 38' (pen.)	Report	Zaccheus Polius 77'	Stadium: André Kamperveen Stadion

17 October 2010 Caribbean Cup qualification	Netherlands Antilles	2–2	Saint Lucia	Paramaribo, Suriname
	Liasandro Trenidad 30'; Bryan Anastatia 89' (pen.)	Report	Zaccheus Polius 7', 36'	Stadium: André Kamperveen Stadion

=== 2011 ===
8 July 2014 FIFA World Cup qualification	Aruba	4–2	Saint Lucia	Oranjestad, Aruba
	Erik Santos de Gouveia 13'; Maurice Escalona 48'; Frederick Gomez 76'; David Abdul 85'	Report	Kevin Edward 20'; Cliff Valcin 46'	Stadium: Trinidad Stadium

12 July 2014 FIFA World Cup qualification	Saint Lucia	4–2	Aruba	Castries, Saint Lucia
	Jamil Joseph 14', 29', 71'; Kurt Frederick 74'	Report	Kevin Edward 20'; Cliff Valcin 46'	Stadium: Mindoo Phillip Park

21 August Friendly	Barbados	4–0	Saint Lucia	Saint Michael, Barbados
	Riviere Williams 35'; Kadeem Atkins 45', 56'; Kyle Gibson 90'	Report		Stadium: Barbados National Stadium

2 September 2014 FIFA World Cup qualification	Canada	4–1	Saint Lucia	Toronto, Canada
	Josh Simpson 6', 61'; Dwayne De Rosario 50' (pen.); Will Johnson 90+1'	Report	Tremain Paul 7'	Stadium: BMO Field

6 September 2014 FIFA World Cup qualification	Saint Lucia	2–4	Saint Kitts and Nevis	Gros Islet, Saint Lucia
	Zaine Pierre 65'; Cliff Valcin 84'	Report	Iam Lake 7'; Jevon Francis 12'; Orlando Mitchum 15'; Devaughn Elliott 44'	Stadium: Daren Sammy Cricket Ground

7 October 2014 FIFA World Cup qualification	Saint Lucia	0–7	Canada	Gros Islet, Saint Lucia
		Report	Simeon Jackson 18', 28', 40'; Olivier Occéan 34', 51'; Iain Hume 72', 86'	Stadium: Daren Sammy Cricket Ground

11 October 2014 FIFA World Cup qualification	Saint Kitts and Nevis	1–1	Saint Lucia	Basseterre, Saint Kitts and Nevis
	Ian Lake 83'	Report	Cliff Valcin 74'	Stadium: Warner Park

11 November 2014 FIFA World Cup qualification	Puerto Rico	4–0	Saint Lucia	Bayamón, Puerto Rico
	Cristian Arrieta 4'; Héctor Ramos 14', 46'; Andrés Cabrero 54'	Report		Stadium: Estadio Juan Ramón Loubriel

14 November 2014 FIFA World Cup qualification	Puerto Rico	3–0	Saint Lucia	Mayagüez, Puerto Rico
	Héctor Ramos 13', 85'; Joseph Marrero 87'	Report		Stadium: Mayagüez Athletics Stadium

=== 2012 ===
21 October 2012 Caribbean Cup qualification	Saint Lucia	5–1	Curaçao	Gros Islet, Saint Lucia
	Tremain Paul 14'; Cliff Valcin 44'; Eden Charles 51'; Tafari Charlemagne 87'; Kurt Frederick 90+2'	Report	Christopher Isenia 48'	Stadium: Daren Sammy Cricket Ground

23 October 2012 Caribbean Cup qualification	Saint Lucia	1–0	Saint Vincent and the Grenadines	Gros Islet, Saint Lucia
	Tremain Paul 69'	Report		Stadium: Daren Sammy Cricket Ground

25 October 2012 Caribbean Cup qualification	Saint Lucia	0–3	Guyana	Gros Islet, Saint Lucia
		Report	Vurlon Mills 14', 34'; Gregory Richardson 37'	Stadium: Daren Sammy Cricket Ground

=== 2013 ===
21 April 2013 Windward Islands Tournament	Saint Vincent and the Grenadines	0–2	Saint Lucia	Kingstown, Saint Vincent and the Grenadines
		Report	Eden Charles 24'; Pernal Williams 78'	Stadium: Victoria Park

23 April 2013 Windward Islands Tournament	Grenada	2–1	Saint Lucia	Kingstown, Saint Vincent and the Grenadines
	Lisdon Jules 46'; Denron Daniel 48'	Report	Jamil Joseph 33'	Stadium: Victoria Park

30 November Friendly	Dominica	0–1	Saint Lucia	Roseau, Dominica
		Report	Eden Charles 71'	Stadium: Windsor Park

1 December Friendly	Dominica	1–0	Saint Lucia	Roseau, Dominica
	Randolph Peltier 49' (pen.)	Report		Stadium: Windsor Park

=== 2014 ===
5 March Friendly	Saint Lucia	0–5	Jamaica	Gros Islet, Saint Lucia
		Report	Michael Seaton 8'; Darren Mattocks 12', 78'; Garath McCleary 35'; Deshorn Brown 88'	Stadium: Daren Sammy Cricket Ground

19 March Friendly	Saint Lucia	0–0	Martinique	Gros Islet, Saint Lucia
		Report		Stadium: Daren Sammy Cricket Ground

30 April 2014 Windward Islands Tournament	Dominica	0–2	Saint Lucia	Roseau, Dominica
		Report	Gerlanne Neptune 5'; Eden Charles 47'	Stadium: Windsor Park

2 May 2014 Windward Islands Tournament	Grenada	0–1	Saint Lucia	Roseau, Dominica
		Report	Gerlanne Neptune 70'	Stadium: Windsor Park

4 May 2014 Windward Islands Tournament	Saint Vincent and the Grenadines	0–0	Saint Lucia	Roseau, Dominica
		Report		Stadium: Windsor Park

26 August Friendly	Saint Lucia	0–2	Martinique	Gros Islet, Saint Lucia
		Report	Djénhael Maingé 45'; Karl Vitulin 56'	Stadium: Gros Islet Playing Field

28 August Friendly	Saint Lucia	0–1	Martinique	Gros Islet, Saint Lucia
		Report	Karl Vitulin	Stadium: Gros Islet Playing Field

3 September 2014 Caribbean Cup qualification	Saint Kitts and Nevis	0–0	Saint Lucia	Basseterre, Saint Kitts and Nevis
		Report		Stadium: Warner Park Sporting Complex

5 September 2014 Caribbean Cup qualification	Guyana	0–2	Saint Lucia	Basseterre, Saint Kitts and Nevis
		Report	Sheldon Emmanuel 14'; Jamil Joseph 84'	Stadium: Warner Park Sporting Complex

7 September 2014 Caribbean Cup qualification	Dominica	1–2	Saint Lucia	Basseterre, Saint Kitts and Nevis
	Julian Wade 68'	Report	Cliff Valcin 13', 76'	Stadium: Warner Park Sporting Complex

8 October 2014 Caribbean Cup qualification	Antigua and Barbuda	2–1	Saint Lucia	Couva, Trinidad and Tobago
	Keiran Murtagh 67'; Josh Parker 90+1'	Report	Kurt Frederick 42'	Stadium: Ato Boldon Stadium

10 October 2014 Caribbean Cup qualification	Trinidad and Tobago	2–0	Saint Lucia	Couva, Trinidad and Tobago
	Ataullah Guerra 6'; Kenwyne Jones 67'	Report		Stadium: Ato Boldon Stadium

12 October 2014 Caribbean Cup qualification	Dominican Republic	3–2	Saint Lucia	Couva, Trinidad and Tobago
	Jonathan Faña 37' (pen.); Kerbi Rodríguez 71'; Inoel Navarro 85'	Report	Zaccheus Polius 71', 87'	Stadium: Ato Boldon Stadium

=== 2015 ===
22 March Friendly	Guyana	2–0	Saint Lucia	Providence, Guyana
	Eon Alleyne 34'; Sheldon Holder 49'	Report		Stadium: Providence Stadium

12 May 2015 Windward Islands Tournament	Saint Lucia	1–1	Dominica	Vieux Fort, Saint Lucia
	Malik St. Prix 16'	Report	Glensworth Elizee 83'	Stadium: Philip Marcellin Grounds

14 May 2015 Windward Islands Tournament	Saint Lucia	1–2	Saint Vincent and the Grenadines	Vieux Fort, Saint Lucia
	Romiel Felix 38'	Report	Emerald George 75'; Myron Samuel 85'	Stadium: Philip Marcellin Grounds

16 May 2015 Windward Islands Tournament	Saint Lucia	0–2	Grenada	Vieux Fort, Saint Lucia
		Report	Jamal Charles 3', 74'	Stadium: Philip Marcellin Grounds

10 June 2018 FIFA World Cup qualification	Antigua and Barbuda	1–3	Saint Lucia	North Sound, Antigua and Barbuda
	Tevaughn Harriette 21'	Report	Tremain Paul 26'; David Henry 61'; Troy Greenidge 90+1'	Stadium: Sir Vivian Richards Stadium

14 June 2018 FIFA World Cup qualification	Antigua and Barbuda	4–1	Saint Lucia	North Sound, Antigua and Barbuda
	Josh Parker 72', 90+3'; Tevaughn Harriette 85'; Aaron Tumwa 90+5'	Report	Kurt Frederick 81' (pen.)	Stadium: Sir Vivian Richards Stadium

=== 2017 ===
28 June 2017 Windward Islands Tournament	Saint Vincent and the Grenadines	1–2	Saint Lucia	St. George's, Grenada
	Chavel Cunningham 89'	Report	Melanius Mullarkey 74'; Kurt Frederick 80'	Stadium: Kirani James Athletic Stadium

30 June 2017 Windward Islands Tournament	Grenada	2–0	Saint Lucia	Sauteurs, Grenada
	Jake Rennie 44'; Shavon John-Brown 51'	Report		Stadium: Fond Playing Field

3 July 2017 Windward Islands Tournament	Barbados	1–1	Saint Lucia	St. George's, Grenada
	Zico Edmee 72'	Report	Kurt Frederick 35'	Stadium: Kirani James Athletic Stadium

4 July 2017 Windward Islands Tournament	Dominica	0–0	Saint Lucia	St. George's, Grenada
		Report		Stadium: Kirani James Athletic Stadium

=== 2018 ===
7 September 2019–20 CONCACAF Nations League qualifying	Antigua and Barbuda	0–3	Saint Lucia	North Sound, Antigua and Barbuda
		Report	Pernal Williams 50'; Andrus Remy 67'; Jevick Macfarlane 90'	Stadium: Sir Vivian Richards Stadium

16 October 2019–20 CONCACAF Nations League qualifying	Haiti	2–1	Saint Lucia	Fort-de-France, Martinique
	Soni Mustivar 13'; Charles Hérold Jr. 33'	Report	Pernal Williams 43'	Stadium: Stade Pierre-Aliker

17 November 2019–20 CONCACAF Nations League qualifying	Cayman Islands	0–0	Saint Lucia	George Town, Cayman Islands
		Report		Stadium: Truman Bodden Sports Complex

=== 2019 ===
28 February 2019 Windward Islands Tournament	Grenada	1–0	Saint Lucia	Kingstown, Saint Vincent and the Grenadines
	Chad Mark 17'	Report		Stadium: Victoria Park

2 March 2019 Windward Islands Tournament	Saint Vincent and the Grenadines	2–1	Saint Lucia	Kingstown, Saint Vincent and the Grenadines
	Kishawn Johnny 72'; Cornelius Stewart 79'	Report	Malik St. Prix 49'	Stadium: Victoria Park

4 March 2019 Windward Islands Tournament	Dominica	1–1	Saint Lucia	Kingstown, Saint Vincent and the Grenadines
	Aaron Richard 33'	Report	Travis Joseph 36'	Stadium: Victoria Park

6 March 2019 Windward Islands Tournament	Barbados	2–0	Saint Lucia	Kingstown, Saint Vincent and the Grenadines
	Mario Harte 1'; Ackeel Applewhaite 46'	Report		Stadium: Victoria Park

22 March 2019–20 CONCACAF Nations League qualifying	Aruba	2–3	Saint Lucia	North Sound, Antigua and Barbuda
	Joshua John 53'; Josh Gross 92'	Report	Jevick MacFarlane 38' (62); Lester Joseph 66'	Stadium: Sir Vivian Richards Stadium

7 September 2019–20 CONCACAF Nations League B	El Salvador	3–0	Saint Lucia	San Salvador, El Salvador
	Narciso Orellana 7'; Darwin Cerén 73' (pen.); Nelson Bonilla 87'	Report		Stadium: Estadio Cuscatlán; Attendance: 20,000

10 September 2019–20 CONCACAF Nations League B	Montserrat	1–1	Saint Lucia	Lookout, Montserrat
	Spencer Weir-Daley 45'	Report	Kurt Frederick 87' (pen.)	Stadium: Blakes Estate Stadium

12 October 2019–20 CONCACAF Nations League B	Dominican Republic	3–0	Saint Lucia	Santo Domingo, Dominican Republic
	Jean Carlos López 34'; Dorny Romero 52'; Rudolf González 85'	Report		Stadium: Estadio Olímpico Félix Sánchez

15 October 2019–20 CONCACAF Nations League B	Saint Lucia	0–2	El Salvador	Gros Islet, Saint Lucia
		Report	Rodolfo Zelaya 68'; Juan Carlos Portillo 88'	Stadium: Darren Sammy Cricket Ground

16 November 2019–20 CONCACAF Nations League B	Saint Lucia	1–0	Dominican Republic	Gros Islet, Saint Lucia
	Antonio Joseph 38'	Report		Stadium: Darren Sammy Cricket Ground

19 November 2019–20 CONCACAF Nations League B	Saint Lucia	0–1	Montserrat	Gros Islet, Saint Lucia
		Report	Nathan Pond 35'	Stadium: Darren Sammy Cricket Ground

=== 2022 ===
28 May Friendly	Guyana	3–2	Saint Lucia	Marabella, Trinidad and Tobago
		Report		Stadium: Mannie Ramjohn Stadium

30 May Friendly	Trinidad and Tobago	1–0	Saint Lucia	Marabella, Trinidad and Tobago
	Nicholas Dillon 35'	Report		Stadium: Mannie Ramjohn Stadium

9 June 2022–23 CONCACAF Nations League C	Dominica	0–1	Saint Lucia	Roseau, Dominica
		Report	Jevick Macfarlane 54'	Stadium: Windsor Park; Referee: Odette Hamilton (Jamaica)

12 June 2022–23 CONCACAF Nations League C	Saint Lucia	2–0	Anguilla	Gros Islet, Saint Lucia
	Andrus Remy 44'; Kurt Frederick 60'	Report		Stadium: Daren Sammy Cricket Ground; Referee: Kwinsi Williams (Trinidad and Tobago)

17 November Friendly	Saint Lucia	1–1	San Marino	Gros Islet, Saint Lucia
18:00 UTC−4	Jn Baptiste 31'	Report	Lazzari 90+4'	Stadium: Daren Sammy Cricket Ground; Referee: Moet Gaymes (Saint Vincent and the Grenadines)

20 November Friendly	Saint Lucia	1–0	San Marino	Gros Islet, Saint Lucia
16:00 UTC−4	Frederick 68' (pen.)	Report		Stadium: Daren Sammy Cricket Ground

=== 2023 ===
3 March Friendly	Grenada	1–2	Saint Lucia	St. George's, Grenada
18:00 UTC−4	Williams 18'	Report	Remy 30'; Elva 69'	Stadium: National Cricket Stadium

5 March Friendly	Grenada	2–0	Saint Lucia	St. George's, Grenada
18:00 UTC−4		Report		Stadium: National Cricket Stadium

24 March 2022–23 CONCACAF Nations League C	Anguilla	1–2	Saint Lucia	The Valley, Anguilla
	Carpenter 76'	Report	Remy 18'; President 45+2'	Stadium: Raymond E. Guishard Stadium; Referee: Moeth Gaymes (Saint Vincent and the Grenadines)

27 March 2022–23 CONCACAF Nations League C	Saint Lucia	3–1	Dominica	Gros Islet, Saint Lucia
		Report		Stadium: Daren Sammy Cricket Ground

16 June 2023 CONCACAF Gold Cup qualification	Martinique	3–1	Saint Lucia	Fort Lauderdale, United States
19:00 UTC−4	Fabien 18'; Labeau 74'; Burner 86'	Report	Hackett-Fairchild 40'	Stadium: DRV PNK Stadium; Referee: Reon Radix (Grenada)

7 September 2023–24 CONCACAF Nations League B	Sint Maarten	1–5	Saint Lucia	Willemstad, Curaçao
18:00 UTC−4	Amatkarijo 51'	Report	Poleon 45', 48', 89'; Hackett-Fairchild 57'; Stanislas 75'	Stadium: Stadion Rignaal 'Jean' Francisca; Referee: Ricangel de Leça (Aruba)

10 September 2023–24 CONCACAF Nations League B	Saint Lucia	2–0	Saint Kitts and Nevis	Gros Islet, Saint Lucia
19:00 UTC−4	President 49'; Stanislas 75'	Report		Stadium: Daren Sammy Cricket Ground; Referee: Moeth Gaymes (Saint Vincent and the Grenadines)

12 October 2023–24 CONCACAF Nations League B	Saint Lucia	2–1	Guadeloupe	Gros Islet, Saint Lucia
20:00 UTC−4	Elva 45'; Mac Farlane 58'	Report	Roussillon 29'	Stadium: Daren Sammy Cricket Ground; Attendance: 2,700; Referee: Oshane Nation (Jamaica)

15 October 2023–24 CONCACAF Nations League B	Guadeloupe	2–0	Saint Lucia	Sainte-Anne, Guadeloupe
15:30 UTC−4	Plumain 52' (pen.), 71'	Report		Stadium: Stade Municipal de Sainte-Anne; Attendance: 580; Referee: Nicolas Wassouf (Martinique)

16 November 2023–24 CONCACAF Nations League B	Saint Kitts and Nevis	0–0	Saint Lucia	Basseterre, Saint Kitts and Nevis
19:00 UTC−4		Report		Stadium: SKNFA Technical Center; Attendance: 120; Referee: David Gómez (Costa Rica)

19 November 2023–24 CONCACAF Nations League B	Saint Lucia	1–2	Sint Maarten	Gros Islet, Saint Lucia
15:00 UTC−4	Thomas 12'	Report	Amatkarijo 38'; Lake 56'	Stadium: Daren Sammy Cricket Ground; Referee: Marco Ortiz (Mexico)

=== 2024 ===
6 June 2026 FIFA World Cup qualification	Haiti	2–1	Saint Lucia	Wildey, Barbados
17:00 UTC−4	Duverne 47'; Nazon 78'	Report (FIFA); Report (CONCACAF)	Elva 18'	Stadium: Wildey Turf; Attendance: 88; Referee: Ismail Elfath (United States)

11 June 2026 FIFA World Cup qualification	Saint Lucia	2–2	Aruba	Wildey, Barbados
15:00 UTC−4	Stanislas 45+2'; Pearson 66'	Report (FIFA); Report (CONCACAF)	Bennett 22'; Marselia 43'	Stadium: Wildey Turf; Attendance: 42; Referee: Selvin Brown (Honduras)

6 September 2024–25 Nations League	Saint Lucia	2–1	Curaçao	St. George's, Grenada
17:00 UTC−6	Arkell Jude-Boyd 24'; Caniggia Elva 55'	Report (CONCACAF)	Joshua Brenet 63'	Stadium: Kirani James Athletic Stadium; Referee: Ken Pennyfeather (Antigua and Barbuda)

9 September 2024–25 Nations League	Grenada	1–2	Saint Lucia	St. George's, Grenada
--:-- UTC−6	Lucas Akins 51'	Report	Christian Forino Joseph 13'; Donavan Jn. Baptiste 21'	Stadium: Kirani James Athletic Stadium; Referee: Josue Ugalde Aguilar (Costa Rica)

11 October 2024–25 Nations League	Saint Martin	1–2	Saint Lucia	Gros Islet, Saint Lucia
20:00 UTC−4	Raga 30'	Report	Elva 76, 90'	Stadium: Daren Sammy Cricket Ground; Referee: Odette Hamilton (Jamaica)

14 October 2024–25 Nations League	Saint Lucia	0–4	Saint Martin	Gros Islet, Saint Lucia
19:00 UTC−4		Report	Lebon 8, 45+2' Barakat 26' Arne 62'	Stadium: Daren Sammy Cricket Ground; Referee: Michael Venne (Canada)

15 November 2024–25 Nations League	Saint Lucia	0–4	Grenada	Willemstad, Curaçao
15:00 (16:00 UTC−4)		Report	Francis 50'; Reg. Charles-Cook 56'; Williams 74'; Hippolyte 86'	Stadium: Ergilio Hato Stadium; Referee: Shavin Greene (Guyana)

18 November 2024–25 Nations League	Curaçao	4–1	Saint Lucia	Willemstad, Curaçao
8:00 (19:00 UTC−4)	Kastaneer 27', 30'; J. Bacuna 73', 79'	Report	Charles 29'	Stadium: Ergilio Hato Stadium; Referee: Fernando Hernández (Mexico)

=== 2025 ===
6 June 2026 FIFA World Cup qualification	Curaçao	4–0	Saint Lucia	Willemstad, Curaçao
19:30 UTC−4	Kastaneer 37', 52', 57'; Bacuna 74'	Report		Stadium: Ergilio Hato Stadium; Referee: José Raúl Torres Rivera (Puerto Rico)

10 June 2026 FIFA World Cup qualification	Saint Lucia	2–1	Barbados	Gros Islet, Saint Lucia
18:00 UTC−4	Elva 42' (pen.), 90' (pen.)	Report	Richards 12'	Stadium: Daren Sammy Cricket Ground; Attendance: 144; Referee: Sergio Reyna (Guatemala)

12 November 2025–26 CONCACAF Series	Cuba	3–0	Saint Lucia	Santiago, Dominican Republic
17:00 UTC−4	Torres 38'; Matos 45+1'; Reyes 53'	Report		Stadium: Estadio Cibao FC

15 November 2025–26 CONCACAF Series	Saint Vincent and the Grenadines	3–1	Saint Lucia	Santiago, Dominican Republic
20:00 UTC−4	Anderson 12'; Spring 13'; Solomon 62'		Elva 45'	Stadium: Estadio Cibao FC

=== 2026 ===
27 March 2026 2026 FIFA Series	Azerbaijan	6–1	Saint Lucia	Sumgayit, Azerbaijan
19:10 UTC+4	Mahmudov 2' (pen.); Sadıxov 21'; Qurbanlı 37'; T. Bayramov 64'; Isgandarli 86'; R. Akhmedzade 89'	Report	Phillip 52' (pen.)	Stadium: Sumgayit City Stadium; Referee: Giorgi Kruashvili (Georgia)
