= 2013 Windward Islands Tournament squads =

The 2013 Windward Islands Tournament is an international football tournament which will take place in St. Vincent between 21 April and 29 April 2013.

Players marked (c) were named as captain for their national squad.

== Dominica ==
Coach: (Dominica) Kurt Hector

No.	Pos.	Player	Date of birth (age)	Caps	Club
	GK	Glenson Prince	17 September 1987 (aged 25)		
	GK	Elijah Toulon			
	DF	Collin Bernard	16 June 1981 (aged 31)		
	DF	Calvin Christopher	4 May 1980 (aged 32)		
	DF	Elmond Derrick	10 December 1986 (aged 26)		
	DF	Noran Jno Hope	17 October 1983 (aged 29)		
	DF	Malcolm Joseph	10 October 1993 (aged 19)		
	DF	Egbert Walsh	11 June 1989 (aged 23)		
	MF	Chad Bertrand	19 December 1986 (aged 26)		
	MF	Delbert Dailey	23 October 1982 (aged 30)		
	MF	Lester Langlais	21 February 1984 (aged 29)		
	MF	Lex Mility	15 January 1985 (aged 28)		
	MF	Joslyn Prince	17 August 1990 (aged 22)		
	MF	Kelrick Walter	6 November 1989 (aged 23)		
	FW	Eddie Thomas	17 February 1988 (aged 25)		
	FW	Kurlson Benjamin (c)	7 December 1984 (aged 28)		
	FW	Romario Burgins	20 August 1995 (aged 17)		
	FW	Nilster George			

== Grenada ==
Coach: (Grenada) Clark John

No.	Pos.	Player	Date of birth (age)	Caps	Club
	GK	Junior Belfon	3 January 1990 (aged 23)		
	GK	Shaddai Mark	14 April 1994 (aged 19)		
	DF	Raymond Alleyne	10 November 1991 (aged 21)		
	DF	Mackell Gannes	24 January 1994 (aged 19)		
	DF	Michael Mark	21 April 1986 (aged 27)		
	DF	Kimron Marshall	28 February 1993 (aged 20)		
	DF	Nicko Williams	24 October 1989 (aged 23)		
	MF	Ryan Alexander	7 February 1993 (aged 20)		
	MF	Brian Andrew	9 November 1990 (aged 22)		
	MF	Kwan Baptiste	25 May 1985 (aged 27)		
	MF	Kevin Edwards	3 September 1992 (aged 20)		
	MF	Ariel Jacob	8 January 1988 (aged 25)		
	MF	Cassim Langaigne	27 February 1980 (aged 33)		
	MF	Moron Phillip	19 March 1992 (aged 21)		
	MF	Arnold Pierre	22 March 1993 (aged 20)		
	MF	Shane Rennie	14 December 1985 (aged 27)		
	MF	Junior Williams	3 November 1987 (aged 25)		
	FW	Denron Daniel	14 March 1989 (aged 24)		
	FW	Joel Greenidge	21 February 1984 (aged 29)		
	FW	Shavon John-Brown	13 April 1995 (aged 18)		
	FW	Marcus Julien	30 December 1986 (aged 26)		
	FW	Quintana Olgivie	23 May 1986 (aged 26)		
	FW	Kimron Redhead	19 April 1982 (aged 31)		
	FW	Kade Wellington	11 March 1990 (aged 23)		
		Lisdon Jules	11 March 1990 (aged 23)		
		Lydon Hassel			
		Leodan Lewis			

== Saint Lucia ==
Coach: (Saint Lucia) Francis Lastic

No.	Pos.	Player	Date of birth (age)	Caps	Club
	GK	Iran Cassius	3 January 1985 (aged 28)		
	GK	Randy Poleon	29 January 1986 (aged 27)		
	DF	Erick Gabriel	28 July 1990 (aged 22)		
	DF	Pernal Williams	15 August 1991 (aged 21)		
	MF	Rickson Augustin	13 December 1982 (aged 30)		
	MF	Sheldon Emmanuel	25 November 1979 (aged 33)		
	MF	Romiel Felix	30 September 1989 (aged 23)		
	MF	Everton Lambert	22 April 1986 (aged 26)		
	FW	Eden Charles	29 October 1993 (aged 19)		
	FW	Jamil Joseph	17 January 1991 (aged 22)		
	FW	Troy Prospere	10 October 1985 (aged 27)		
	FW	Cliff Valcin	20 March 1986 (aged 27)		
		Melvin Aurelien			
		Emmery Edward			
		Shanoi Shawn Evans			
		Saklim Joseph			
		Alton Robert			

== Saint Vincent and the Grenadines ==
Coach: (Saint Vincent and the Grenadines) Cornelius Huggins

No.	Pos.	Player	Date of birth (age)	Caps	Club
	GK	Kenyan Desmond Lynch	December 15, 1985 (aged 27)		
	DF	Odanza Dennie	March 9, 1986 (aged 27)		
	DF	Jolanshoy McDowall	August 21, 1989 (aged 23)		
	DF	Reginald Richardson	March 1, 1990 (aged 23)		
	DF	Azinho Solomon	October 12, 1994 (aged 18)		
	DF	Nical Stephens	July 17, 1992 (aged 20)		
	MF	Wendell Cuffy	August 10, 1989 (aged 23)		
	MF	Darren Hamlett	March 23, 1989 (aged 24)		
	MF	Nazir McBurnette	February 18, 1993 (aged 20)		
	MF	Roy Richards	November 24, 1983 (aged 29)		
	MF	Shemol Trimmingham	December 22, 1989 (aged 23)		
	FW	Myron Samuel	December 19, 1992 (aged 20)		
	FW	Shandel Samuel	December 14, 1982 (aged 30)		
	FW	Jomo Toppin	September 8, 1993 (aged 19)		
