= 2014 Windward Islands Tournament squads =

The 2014 Windward Islands Tournament is an international football tournament between the Windward Islands nations which will be hosted by Dominica between 30 April and 4 May 2014.

Players marked (c) were named as captain for their national squad.

== Dominica ==
Coach: (Dominica) Ronnie Gustave

No.	Pos.	Player	Date of birth (age)	Caps	Club
	GK	Elijah Toulon (vice-captain)	6 October 1993 (aged 20)	2	
	GK	Dion Laurent	27 December 1990 (aged 23)	0	
	DF	Delbert Dailey	23 October 1982 (aged 31)	8	
	DF	Hubert Prince	26 June 1989 (aged 24)	9	
	DF	Calvin Christopher	4 May 1980 (aged 33)	12	
	DF	Egbert Walsh	11 June 1989 (aged 24)	3	
	DF	Chris Lawrence		0	
	MF	Briel Thomas	25 November 1994 (aged 19)	2	
	MF	Joslyn Prince	17 August 1990 (aged 23)	4	
	MF	Shern Dailey	13 March 1986 (aged 28)	5	
	MF	Kelrick Walters	6 November 1989 (aged 24)	9	
	FW	Anfernee Frederick		0	
	FW	Joel Etienne-Clark	13 October 1984 (aged 29)	4	
	FW	Kurlson Benjamin (captain)	7 December 1984 (aged 29)	20	
	FW	Mitchell Joseph	2 September 1986 (aged 27)	13	
	FW	Julian Wade	12 July 1989 (aged 24)	0	
	FW	Delroy Parker	15 October 1997 (aged 16)	1	
	FW	Vernent Joseph	17 March 1994 (aged 20)	0	
	FW	Lester Langlais	21 February 1984 (aged 30)	18	

== Grenada ==
Coach: (Grenada) Clarke John

No.	Pos.	Player	Date of birth (age)	Caps	Club
	GK	Jason Belfon	3 July 1990 (aged 23)	2	
	GK	Shemel Louison	9 August 1990 (aged 23)	10	
	DF	Nickson "Kwan" Baptiste	24 October 1989 (aged 24)	14	
	DF	Lisdon Jules	11 March 1990 (aged 24)	w	
	DF	Michael Mark	21 April 1986 (aged 28)	15	
	DF	Shanon Phillip	9 November 1988 (aged 25)	22	
	DF	Nicko Williams	26 May 1985 (aged 28)	2	
	MF	Rickel Augustine	4 March 1991 (aged 23)	2	
	MF	Henson Cuffie	15 January 1987 (aged 27)	8	
	MF	Cassim Langaigne	27 February 1980 (aged 34)	43	
	MF	Moron Phillip	19 March 1992 (aged 22)	11	
	MF	Jake Rennie	30 January 1983 (aged 31)	4	
	MF	Shane Rennie	14 December 1986 (aged 27)	43	
	FW	Kitson Bain	26 May 1982 (aged 31)	25	
	FW	Denron Daniel	14 March 1989 (aged 25)	6	
	FW	Clive Murray	5 December 1990 (aged 23)	14	
	FW	Kimron Redhead	19 May 1982 (aged 31)	12	
	FW	Kade Wellington	11 March 1990 (aged 24)	0	

== Saint Lucia ==
Coach: (Saint Lucia) Francis Lastic

No.	Pos.	Player	Date of birth (age)	Caps	Club
	GK	Randy Poleon	29 January 1986 (aged 28)	7	
	GK	Alton Robert	12 May 1982 (aged 31)	0	
	DF	Emmery Edward	11 October 1994 (aged 19)	1	
	DF	Sabbatus Hunte	6 December 1986 (aged 27)	2	
	DF	Gervan Janvier	24 February 1992 (aged 22)	0	
	DF	John-Perry Joseph	24 June 1981 (aged 32)	5	
	DF	Pernal Williams	15 August 1991 (aged 22)	18	
	MF	Vernan Abbott	6 December 1994 (aged 19)	0	
	MF	Rickson Augustin	13 December 1982 (aged 31)	12	
	MF	Melvin Aurélien	13 May 1992 (aged 21)	3	
	MF	Sheldon Emmanuel	25 November 1979 (aged 34)	10	
	MF	Romiel Felix	30 September 1989 (aged 24)	8	
	MF	Everton Lambert	22 April 1986 (aged 28)	11	
	FW	Eden Charles	29 October 1993 (aged 20)	10	
	FW	Nyhime Gilbert	29 October 1993 (aged 20)	2	
	FW	Zaccheus Polius	8 April 1985 (aged 29)	8	
		Gerlanne Neptune		0	

== Saint Vincent and the Grenadines ==
Coach: (Saint Vincent and the Grenadines) Cornelius Huggins
