= 2014 FIFA World Cup qualification – CONCACAF first round =

Football tournament qualification stage

This page provides the summaries of the CONCACAF first round matches for 2014 FIFA World Cup qualification.

== Format ==
In this round the ten lowest seeded teams were drawn into 5 home-and-away ties.

The matches were scheduled to be held prior to the main draw for the 2014 FIFA World Cup. Originally, the first legs were scheduled for 3 June 2011 and the second legs on 7 June. However, the matches were postponed to scattered days in June and July, between 15 June and 17 July. The five winners advanced to the second round of the CONCACAF qualifiers.

== Participating teams ==
- Belize
- Dominican Republic
- British Virgin Islands
- Saint Lucia
- Turks and Caicos Islands
- Bahamas
- Aruba
- U.S. Virgin Islands
- Anguilla
- Montserrat

== Results ==
Team 1	Agg.	Team 2	1st leg	2nd leg
Montserrat	3–8	Belize	2–5	1–3
Anguilla	0–6	Dominican Republic	0–2	0–4
U.S. Virgin Islands	4–1	British Virgin Islands	2–0	2–1
Aruba	6–6 (4–5 p)	Saint Lucia	4–2	2–4 (a.e.t.)
Turks and Caicos Islands	0–10 (Note: Order of legs reversed from originally published draw.)	Bahamas	0–4	0–6

15 June 2011
18:00 UTC−4

Montserrat	2–5	Belize
Hodgson 44', 86'	Report	McCaulay 24', 75', 83'; Róches 50'; Kuylen 53'

Ato Boldon Stadium, Couva (Trinidad and Tobago) (Note: As Montserrat had no facilities on the island that meet international standards, they elected to play their home tie in Trinidad and Tobago.)
Attendance: 100
Referee: Bryan Willett (Antigua and Barbuda)
17 July 2011
16:00 UTC−6

Belize	3–1	Montserrat
Jiménez 23'; McCaulay 59'; Méndez 61'	Report	Hodgson 58'

Estadio Olímpico, San Pedro Sula (Honduras) (Note: The second leg was originally scheduled to be played on 19 June 2011 at FFB Field, Belmopan, but it was postponed as the FIFA Emergency Committee suspended the Football Federation of Belize (FFB) on 17 June due to severe governmental interference. The match had to be rescheduled no later than 10 July, provided that the situation is back to normal regarding the FFB and the suspension has been lifted by that date; if not, Belize would be excluded from the qualifying competition. On 7 July, FIFA announced that the suspension was provisionally lifted and the match will take place before 17 July outside of Belize. The FFB secured the qualifier to be played at Estadio Olímpico Metropolitano in San Pedro Sula, Honduras.)
Attendance: 150
Referee: Oscar Reyna (Guatemala)

Belize won 8–3 on aggregate and advanced to the second round.

8 July 2011
15:30 UTC−4

Anguilla	0–2	Dominican Republic
	Report	Peralta 7'; Faña 42'

Estadio Panamericano, San Cristóbal,
(Dominican Republic) (Note: As Anguilla had no facilities on the island that meet international standards, they elected to play their home tie in the Dominican Republic.)
Attendance: 1,000
Referee: Neal Brizan (Trinidad and Tobago)
10 July 2011
15:30 UTC−4

Dominican Republic	4–0	Anguilla
Navarro 18', 42'; Sánchez 27'; Faña 58'	Report

Estadio Panamericano, San Cristóbal
Attendance: 1,500
Referee: Marcos Brea (Cuba)

Dominican Republic won 6–0 on aggregate and advances to the second round.

3 July 2011
16:00 UTC−4

U.S. Virgin Islands	2–0	British Virgin Islands
Lesmond 7'; Klopp 57'	Report

Lionel Roberts Park, Charlotte Amalie
Attendance: 350
Referee: Mauricio Navarro (Canada)
10 July 2011
15:00 UTC−4

British Virgin Islands	1–2	U.S. Virgin Islands
Peters 38'	Report	Thomas 2'; Klopp 90+3'

Sherly Ground, Road Town
Attendance: 600
Referee: Kevin Morrison (Jamaica)

U.S. Virgin Islands won 4–1 on aggregate and advanced to the second round.

8 July 2011
20:00 UTC−4

Aruba	4–2	Saint Lucia
Santos de Gouveia 13'; Escalona 48'; Gomez 76'; D. Abdul 85'	Report	Edward 20'; Valcin 46'

Trinidad Stadium, Oranjestad
Attendance: 300
Referee: Nolan Foster (Cayman Islands)
12 July 2011
15:30 UTC−4

Saint Lucia	4–2 (a.e.t.)	Aruba
J. Joseph 14', 29', 71'; Frederick 74'	Report	Gomez 44'; Barradas 76'
Penalties
Pierre (penalty scored); Justin (penalty scored); Frederick (penalty scored); Edward (penalty scored); Williams (penalty scored)	5–4	(penalty scored) Bergen; (penalty scored) Baten; (penalty scored) Barradas; (penalty scored) Gomez; (penalty missed) Cruden

Mindoo Philip Park, Castries
Attendance: 500
Referee: Stanley Lancaster (Guyana)

6–6 on aggregate. Saint Lucia won the penalty shoot-out 5–4 and advanced to the second round.

2 July 2011
17:00 UTC−4

Turks and Caicos Islands	0–4	Bahamas
	Report	Jean 32', 61'; Hepple 36' (pen.); Louis 90+2'

National Stadium, Providenciales
Attendance: 1,021
Referee: Hugo Cruz (Costa Rica)
9 July 2011
16:00 UTC−4

Bahamas	6–0	Turks and Caicos Islands
Gibson 4' (o.g.); St. Fleur 17', 64', 73', 84', 90'	Report

Roscow A. L. Davies Soccer Field, Nassau
Attendance: 1,600
Referee: Javier Santos (Puerto Rico)

Bahamas won 10–0 on aggregate and advanced to the second round.

== Goalscorers ==
There were 44 goals scored in 10 matches, for an average of 4.4 goals per match.

5 goals

- (The Bahamas) Lesly St. Fleur

4 goals

- (Belize) Deon McCaulay

3 goals

- (Montserrat) Jaylee Hodgson
- (Saint Lucia) Jamil Joseph

2 goals

- (Aruba) Frederick Gomez
- (The Bahamas) Nesley Jean
- (Dominican Republic) Jonathan Faña
- (Dominican Republic) Inoel Navarro
- (United States Virgin Islands) Reid Klopp

1 goal

- (Aruba) David Abdul
- (Aruba) Rensy Barradas
- (Aruba) Maurice Escalona
- (Aruba) Erik Santos de Gouveia
- (The Bahamas) Cameron Hepple
- (The Bahamas) Jackner Louis
- (Belize) Daniel Jiménez
- (Belize) Elroy Kuylen
- (Belize) Luis Mendez
- (Belize) Harrison Róches
- (British Virgin Islands) Trevor Peters
- (Dominican Republic) Domingo Peralta
- (Dominican Republic) Jhoan Sánchez
- (Saint Lucia) Kevin Edward
- (Saint Lucia) Kurt Frederick
- (Saint Lucia) Cliff Valcin
- (United States Virgin Islands) Alderman Lesmond
- (United States Virgin Islands) Dwayne Thomas

1 own goal

- (Turks and Caicos Islands) Woody Gibson (against Bahamas)
