= List of football federations =

Overview of global/continental/regional football governing bodies

This is a list of current and defunct international association football organizations and governing bodies, categorized by their geographical scope and their affiliated territories. Including global, international, intercontinental, continental, regional and subregional entities.

== Worldwide / International ==
=== Current ===
Type	Acronym	Full name	Members	Founded	Territory	Premier competition
Worldwide and international governing body	FIFA (Note: Official governing body for world football and all affiliated members across the globe.)	Fédération Internationale de Football Association	211	1904	All affiliated nations and confederations from around the world	FIFA World Cup
Worldwide confederation	CONIFA	Confederation of Independent Football Associations	38	2013 (as CIFA)	Communities, micronations, dependencies, unrecognized states and autonomous regions not affiliated with FIFA	CONIFA World Football Cup

=== Defunct ===
Type	Acronym	Full name	Members	Founded	Dissolved	Territorry	Premier competition
Independent worldwide body	NF-Board	New Football Federations-Board/ Nouvelle Fédération-Board	32 (18 full members)	2003	2013	Communities, micronations, dependencies, unrecognized states and autonomous regions not affiliated with FIFA	Viva World Cup
Independent worldwide body	WUFA	World Unity Football Alliance	19	2020	Unknown	Communities, micronations, dependencies, unrecognized states and autonomous regions not affiliated with FIFA	WUFA World Series
Independent international body	FIFI	Federation of International Football of Independents	5	2006		Regions and territories not affiliated with FIFA	FIFI Wild Cup
Independent international body	UIAFA	Union Internationale Amateur de Football Association	7	1908	1912	Amateur associations not affiliated with FIFA	Amateur European Championship
Independent international body	IFU	International Football Union	2	2009	2010	Teams not affiliated with FIFA	—

== Intercontinental ==
=== Current ===
Type	Acronym	Full name	Members	Founded	Territory	Premier competition
Independent intercontinental body affiliated with FIFA	UAFA	Union of Arab Football Associations	22	1974	Arab world (Note: Comprising the Arab nations on the continents of Africa and Asia.)	FIFA Arab Cup (Note: Organized by FIFA since 2021, and previously organized by UAFA.)

=== Defunct ===
Type	Acronym	Full name	Members	Member confederations	Founded	Dissolved	Territory	Premier competition
Intercontinental confederation affiliated with FIFA	PFC/CPF	Panamerican Football Confederation/ Confederación Panamericana de Fútbol	24	CONMEBOL, CCCF, NAFC	1946	1961	Americas (Note: Comprising the totality of the continents of North America and South America.)	Panamerican Championship

== Continental ==
=== Current ===
Type	Acronym	Full name	Members	Founded	Territory	Premier competition
FIFA continental confederation	AFC	Asian Football Confederation	47	1954	Asia	AFC Asian Cup
FIFA continental confederation	CAF	Confederation of African Football	56 (54 full members)	1957	Africa	African Cup of Nations
FIFA continental confederation	CONCACAF	Confederation of North, Central American and Caribbean Association Football	41	1961	North America, (Note: Comprising the regions of Northern America, Central America and Caribbean.); The Guianas (Note: South American subregion comprising the countries of Guyana and Suriname, and the overseas department of French Guiana.)	CONCACAF Gold Cup
FIFA continental confederation	CONMEBOL	Confederación Sudamericana de Fútbol	10	1916	South America	Copa América
FIFA continental confederation	OFC	Oceania Football Confederation	13 (11 full members)	1966	Oceania (Note: Comprising New Zealand and the regions of Melanesia, Micronesia and Polynesia.)	OFC Nations Cup
FIFA continental confederation	UEFA	Union of European Football Associations	55	1954	Europe	UEFA European Championship

Type	Acronym	Full name	Members	Founded	Territory	Premier competition
Independent continental body not affiliated with FIFA	COSANFF	Consejo Sudamericano de Nuevas Federaciones de Fútbol	11	2007	South America (Communities and regional associations not affiliated with FIFA)	Copa COSANFF

=== Defunct ===
Type	Acronym	Full name	Members	Founded	Dissolved	Territory	Premier Competition
NF-Board continental confederation	CENF	Confederation of European New Federations	Unknown	2007	2009	Europe (communities, unrecognized states and regional associations not affiliated with FIFA)	CENF Cup

== Regional / Subregional ==
=== Africa ===
Type	Acronym	Full name	Members	Founded	Territory	Premier competition
CAF regional subconfederation	CECAFA	Council for East and Central African Football Associations	11 (10 full members)	1973	East Africa	CECAFA Cup
CAF regional subconfederation	COSAFA	Council of Southern Africa Football Associations	15 (14 full members)	1997	Southern Africa	COSAFA Cup
CAF regional subconfederation	UNAF	Union Nord-Africaine de Football/ Union of North African Football	5	2005	North Africa	—
CAF regional subconfederation	UNIFFAC	Union des Federations de Football d'Afrique Centrale/ Central African Football Federations' Union	8	1959	Central Africa	CEMAC Cup
CAF regional subconfederation	WAFU/UFOA	West African Football Union/ Union des Fédérations Ouest-Africaines de Football	16	1977	West Africa	WAFU Nations Cup

Type	Acronym	Full name	Members	Founded	Territory	Premier competition
Subregional body affiliated with CAF	UFIA (Note: Previously as Union des Fédérations de Football de l'océan Indien (UFFOI).)	Union du Football des Îles & Arcipels/ Union of Football of the Islands and Archipelagos	6	2011 (as UFFOI); 2025 (as UFIA)	Islands of the Western Indian Ocean	—
WAFU subregional zone	WAFU-A	West African Football Union Zone A	9	2011	West Africa	—
WAFU subregional zone	WAFU-B	West African Football Union Zone B	7	2011	West Africa	—

=== Asia ===
Type	Acronym	Full name	Members	Founded	Territory	Premier competition
AFC regional subconfederation	AFF	ASEAN Football Federation	12	1984	Southeast Asia	FIFA ASEAN Cup, ASEAN Championship
AFC regional subconfederation	CAFA	Central Asian Football Association	6	2015	Central Asia	CAFA Nations Cup
AFC regional subconfederation	EAFF	East Asian Football Federation	10	2002	East Asia	EAFF E-1 Football Championship
AFC regional subconfederation	SAFF	South Asian Football Federation	7	1997	South Asia	SAFF Championship
AFC regional subconfederation	WAFF	West Asian Football Federation	12	2001	West Asia	WAFF Championship

Type	Acronym	Full name	Members	Founded	Territory	Premier competition
Independent subregional body not affiliated with AFC	GFF (Note: Previously as Arab Gulf Cup Football Federation (AGCFF).)	Gulf Football Federation	8	2016	Gulf Arab states	Arabian Gulf Cup

=== North America ===
Type	Acronym	Full name	Members	Founded	Territory	Premier competition
CONCACAF regional subconfederation	CFU	Caribbean Football Union	31	1978	Caribbean, (Note: Includes Bermuda.); The Guianas	Caribbean Cup/ CFU Championship
CONCACAF regional subconfederation	NAFU	North American Football Union	3	1990	Northern America (Note: Includes Mexico.)	North American Nations Cup
CONCACAF regional subconfederation	UNCAF	Union Centroamericana de Fútbol	7	1990	Central America	Copa Centroamericana

Type	Acronym	Full name	Members	Founded	Territory	Premier competition
Subregional body affiliated with CFU	LIFA	Leeward Islands Football Association	11	1949	Leeward Islands Archipelago	Leeward Islands Tournament
Subregional body affiliated with CFU	WIFA	Windward Islands Football Association	4	1947	Windward Islands Archipelago	Windward Islands Tournament

=== Defunct ===
Type	Acronym	Full name	Members	Founded	Dissolved	Territory	Premier competition
Regional confederation affiliated with FIFA	CCCF	Confederacion Centroamericana y del Caribe de Futbol	11	1938	1961	Central American, Caribbean, Suriname	CCCF Championship
Regional confederation affiliated with FIFA	NAFC	North American Football Confederation	3	1946	1961	Northern America, Cuba	NAFC Championship
