= Saydrel Lewis =

Grenadian Professional footballer

Personal information
- Full name: Saydrel Jude Lewis
- Date of birth: 27 November 1997 (age 28)
- Place of birth: Mirabeau, Grenada
- Height: 1.87 m (6 ft 1 1/2 in)
- Position: Forward

Team information
- Current team: Paradise FC

Senior career*
Years	Team	Apps	(Gls)
2015–2018	Paradise FC		
2018	St. Andrew Big Parish Stars		
2018–2019	Morvant Caledonia United		(4)
2019	Nejmeh	4	(1)
2019–2020	Real Juventud		
2020–2021	Paradise FC		
2022	Real Juventud		
2023	Paradise FC		
2024	AC Port of Spain		(2)
2024–	Real Juventud		
2024–	Paradise FC		

International career^{‡}
2017–	Grenada	39	(8)
- * Club domestic league appearances and goals as of 1 March 2019 ‡ National team caps and goals as of 18:29, 9 November 2024 (UTC)

Saydrel Jude Lewis (born 27 November 1997) is a Grenadian professional footballer who plays as a forward for Paradise FC and the Grenada national team.

== Club career ==
=== Nejmeh ===
On 23 January 2019, Nejmeh announced the signing of Saydrel Lewis. On 2 February 2019, he scored his first goal for the club against Safa in the Lebanese Premier League, ending the match in a 1–0 win. However, due to falling into a disagreement with the manager, the club decided to release Lewis on 1 March 2019.

Real Juventud

In August 2019, Lewis joined Honduran side Real Juventud.

== International career ==
Lewis marked his international debut with an 89th-minute goal, his side's second of a 2–2 friendly draw with Trinidad and Tobago, having replaced Denron Daniel in the 84th minute.

== Career statistics ==
=== International ===
As of match played 24 March 2023.

National team	Year	Apps	Goals
Grenada	2017	11	4
Grenada	2018	3	1
Grenada	2019	5	0
Grenada	2021	6	2
Grenada	2022	3	0
Grenada	2023	5	0
Total		33	7

==== International goals ====
Scores and results list Grenada's goal tally first.

No.	Date	Venue	Opponent	Score	Result	Competition
1.	29 April 2017	Kirani James Athletic Stadium, St. George's, Grenada	Trinidad and Tobago	2–2	2–2	Friendly
2.	3 July 2017	Kirani James Athletic Stadium, St. George's, Grenada	Saint Vincent and the Grenadines	2–0	4–3	2017 Windward Islands Tournament
3.	3 July 2017	Kirani James Athletic Stadium, St. George's, Grenada	Saint Vincent and the Grenadines	3–1	4–3	2017 Windward Islands Tournament
4.	7 October 2017	Kirani James Athletic Stadium, St. George's, Grenada	Guyana	1–0	1–0	Friendly
5.	17 August 2018	Kirani James Athletic Stadium, St. George's, Grenada	Jamaica	1–3	1–5	Friendly
6.	30 March 2021	Kirani James Athletic Stadium, St. George's, Grenada	U.S. Virgin Islands	1–0	1–0	2022 FIFA World Cup qualification
7.	8 June 2021	Kirani James Athletic Stadium, St. George's, Grenada	Montserrat	1–0	1–2	2022 FIFA World Cup qualification
