= Darryl Roach =

Personal information
- Full name: Darryl Roach
- Date of birth: 7 September 1984 (age 42)
- Place of birth: London, England
- Positions: Midfielder; striker

Team information
- Current team: Hoppers Crossing
- Number: 99

Youth career
- Watford
- –2004: Milton Keynes Dons

Senior career*
Years	Team	Apps	(Gls)
2005	Tilbury		
2005–2007	Wingate & Finchley		
2011–2013	Port Melbourne Sharks	36	(7)
2013	South Springvale	11	(1)
2014	Clifton Hill	20	(14)
2015	Williamstown SC	18	(5)
2017	Sunshine George Cross	1	(0)
2017–	Hoppers Crossing	21	(7)

International career^{‡}
2011–2012	Montserrat	4	(1)
- * Club domestic league appearances and goals as of 31 March 2021 ‡ National team caps and goals as of 2 August 2014

Darryl Roach is an English-born Montserratian footballer who has previously played as a midfielder for Port Melbourne Sharks, and has been capped internationally for the Montserrat national football team.

== Career ==
=== Club career ===
Roach played for Watford's youth team, and Milton Keynes Dons in the 2003–04 season, before having a trial at Aldershot Town in July 2004. Aldershot manager, Terry Brown commented on Roach's performance in a friendly against Maidenhead United; "I think Darryl did well, to be fair the boy's hardly trained and we've come in and put him into two games. He's got talent and you can see that but he doesn't look anywhere near as fit as he should be but that's understandable."

In January 2005, he went on to spend time at Notts County on trial, playing for their reserve team. Roach then joined Southern League Division One East club Tilbury in February 2005, before later moving onto Wingate & Finchley in March 2005.

Roach went on to join the Australian club Port Melbourne Sharks in 2011, where he won the club's player of the season in 2013

In 2015, Roach joined State League 3 North-West side Williamstown SC, alongside his Montserrat teammate Jay'lee Hodgson where he scored 8 goals in 15 appearances.

In 2017, Darryl signed for Sunshine George Cross, where he made 1 appearance in the senior team and 6 appearances in the Under 20 set-up before moving to State League 2 North-West team Hoppers Crossing SC in June and relegated the following year.

=== International career ===
Roach qualifies to play for Montserrat national football team through his mother, who was born on the island. He was called up to the senior squad in 2011, for their 2014 FIFA World Cup CONCACAF first round qualifiers against Belize. He made his debut against Belize on 15 June, in their home fixture, which was played at Ato Boldon Stadium in Couva, Trinidad and Tobago. Montserrat lost 5–2. He played again in the away tie which was at held at Estadio Olímpico Metropolitano in San Pedro Sula, Honduras, but could not prevent Montserrat losing 3–1 and overall 8–3 on aggregate.

== Personal life ==
Roach was born in England, and his grandmother was born in the Caribbean island of Montserrat. He moved to Australia, where he married a local woman.
