= Windward Islands Tournament =

- Organiser(s): Windward Islands Football Association
- Founded: 1947
- Teams: 5
- Current champions: St. Vincent & the Grenadines
- Most championships: Grenada (10)
- 2019

The Windward Islands Tournament is a football tournament that takes place on an annual basis in the Windward Islands region of the Caribbean.

== Participants ==
- Dominica
- Saint Lucia
- Saint Vincent and the Grenadines
- Grenada
- Barbados (Invited)

== Winners ==
Year	Host nation	Winners	Runners-up
1947; Details		No Tournament Data	
1948; Details		No Tournament Data	
1949; Details	Saint Vincent and the Grenadines	No Tournament Data	
1950; Details	Grenada	No Tournament Data	
1952; Details		No Tournament Data	
1958; Details	Saint Vincent and the Grenadines	No Tournament Data	
1959; Details		There was no tournament	
1960; Details	Grenada	Grenada	
1961; Details	St. Lucia	Grenada	Saint Vincent and the Grenadines
1962; Details		Grenada	Saint Vincent and the Grenadines
1963; Details	Dominica	Tournament Canceled	
1964-65; Details	St. Lucia	Saint Lucia	Saint Vincent and the Grenadines
1965; Details	Saint Vincent and the Grenadines	Saint Vincent and the Grenadines	Dominica
1966; Details	Grenada	Saint Vincent and the Grenadines	Grenada
1967; Details	Dominica	Grenada	Saint Lucia
1968; Details	St. Lucia	Grenada	
1969; Details	Saint Vincent and the Grenadines	Grenada	Saint Vincent and the Grenadines
1970; Details	Grenada	Grenada	St. Lucia
1971; Details	Dominica	Dominica	Grenada
1972; Details	St. Lucia	Saint Lucia	Saint Vincent and the Grenadines
1973; Details	Home/away	Saint Vincent and the Grenadines	Dominica
1974; Details	St. Lucia	Grenada	Saint Vincent and the Grenadines
1975; Details	Saint Vincent and the Grenadines	No Tournament Data	
1976; Details	Grenada	No Tournament Data	
1977; Details	Dominica	Tournament Canceled	
1978; Details	Dominica	Tournament Canceled	
1984; Details	St. Lucia	Saint Lucia	Saint Vincent and the Grenadines
1985; Details	Grenada	Dominica	Saint Vincent and the Grenadines
1986; Details	Saint Vincent and the Grenadines	No Tournament Data	
1987; Details	St. Lucia	No Tournament Data	
1988; Details	Dominica	Dominica	
1989; Details	Dominica	No Tournament Data	
1990; Details	Dominica	No Tournament Data	
1991; Details	St. Lucia	No Tournament Data	
1992; Details		No Tournament Data	
1993; Details		No Tournament Data	
1994; Details		No Tournament Data	
1995; Details	Home/away	No Tournament Data	
2001; Details	Grenada	Grenada	Saint Vincent and the Grenadines
2013; Details	Saint Vincent and the Grenadines	Grenada	Saint Lucia
2014; Details	Dominica	Saint Lucia	Saint Vincent and the Grenadines
2015; Details	St. Lucia	Saint Vincent and the Grenadines	Dominica
2017; Details	Grenada	Grenada	Dominica
2019; Details	Saint Vincent and the Grenadines	Saint Vincent and the Grenadines	Barbados

== Medal summary ==
Nation	Winners
Grenada	11
Saint Vincent and the Grenadines	5
Saint Lucia	4
Dominica	3

== Women's Tournaments ==
- Dominica
- Saint Lucia
- Saint Vincent and the Grenadines
- Grenada
- Martinique Invited
- Barbados Invited

Year	Host nation	Winners	Runners-up
2015; Details	Saint Vincent and the Grenadines	Saint Vincent and the Grenadines	Dominica
2016; Details	Dominica	Martinique	Saint Vincent and the Grenadines
2017; Details	Saint Vincent and the Grenadines	Grenada	Barbados
2019; Details	St. Lucia	Saint Vincent and the Grenadines	Saint Lucia
2025; Details	Saint Vincent and the Grenadines	Barbados	Saint Lucia
