= Eric Abdul =

Aruban footballer

Personal information
- Date of birth: 26 February 1986 (age 40)
- Place of birth: Oranjestad, Aruba
- Position: Goalkeeper

Youth career
- –2006: Sparta Rotterdam

Senior career*
| Years | Team | Apps | (Gls) |
| 2006–2010 | Jong Sparta | | |
| 2010–2011 | Zwaluwen '30 | | |
| 2011–2012 | DHC Delft | | |
| 2012–2013 | ASWH | | |
| 2013–2014 | SV Estrella | 6 | (0) |
| 2014–2021 | SV Dakota | 12 | (0) |
| 2021– | SV Racing Club Aruba | 37 | (0) |

International career^{‡}
| 2011–2023 | Aruba | 32 | (0) |
- * Club domestic league appearances and goals ‡ National team caps and goals as of 25 March 2023

Eric Abdul (Oranjestad, 26 February 1986) is an Aruban player of association football in the position of goalkeeper.

== Career ==
=== Clubs ===
Abdul was a youth player for Sparta Rotterdam, where he made it to the Young Sparta Rotterdam selection. Next he played a season in the first section of DHC Delft and from 2012 through the end of 2013 he was a goalkeeper for the Hendrik-Ido-Ambacht side ASWH.

Abdul then returned to his native Aruba, playing from January 2014 for SV Estrella. From 2014 to 2021 he was goalkeeper for SV Dakota. As of 2022, Abdul plays for SV Racing Club Aruba.

=== International ===
In 2011 Abdul was selected to the Aruba national football team. He played in several games for the team. In 2012 he won the ABCS Tournament with the Aruba national football team. In 2023, Abdul is the captain of the Aruba national team.

== Family ==
His brother David is a forward.
