= Mindoo Phillip =

St Lucian cricketer

Francis "Mindoo" Phillip BEM (7 August 1929 – 5 May 2006) was a cricketer from Saint Lucia.

== Biography ==
Phillip was born in Castries, Saint Lucia. He attended the St Aloysius Roman Catholic Boys School from 1934 to 1944 where he was first introduced to football and cricket at the level of inter-school competition.

Mindoo's father was a carpenter, a trade in which he apprenticed for a short time with the Public Works Department in the 1940s, before being hired as the handyman at Victoria Park, then the island's sole first class cricket venue, and home to football, track and field, rugby and a host of cultural events.

In the late forties, Mindoo was a member of the Hollywood Club before leaving to join Charles Augustin's New Park Cricket Club. He spent the remainder of his cricketing career with New Park. His close friend, Stanley French, described Mindoo as "a destroyer of all kinds of bowling and as a gifted all-rounder at home in any part of the field." Although he was recognized around the region as a fine batsman, and was a fixture on the Windward Islands team, he was never selected to the West Indies team. He was also a decent bowler, could field anywhere, including behind the stumps, and was a goalkeeper of some ability.

He played in only one international match, for Windward Islands against Australia on 26 May 1955.

On his retirement from cricket, Mindoo stayed on at the park as curator. He was also a football referee and a national cricket coach, a selector for the national team, an umpire and President of the Saint Lucia Umpires Association. He was also President of the Marchand Football League.

In the 1971 New Year Honours Phillips was awarded the British Empire Medal "for services to cricket in Saint Lucia".

Mindoo was the curator of Victoria Park in Marchand up until his death, and one of the island's greatest sports personalities. In March 1979, Victoria Park was renamed Mindoo Phillip Park in his honour. Upon his death, he was buried at the park and construction began on a monument to his life.
