= Myron Samuel =

Vincentian international footballer (born 1992)

Personal information
- Date of birth: 19 December 1992 (age 33)
- Place of birth: Layou, St. Vincent
- Height: 1.75 m (5 ft 9 in)
- Position: Striker

Youth career
- 2007–2009: System 3 FC

Senior career*
| Years | Team | Apps | (Gls) |
| 2009–2013 | Avenues United FC | 22 | (25) |
| 2013–2015 | Rendezvous FC | | (51) |
| 2015–2016 | Seattle Sounders FC 2 | 23 | (5) |

International career^{‡}
- Saint Vincent and the Grenadines U17
- Saint Vincent and the Grenadines U20
- Saint Vincent and the Grenadines U23
| 2008– | Saint Vincent and the Grenadines | 57 | (23) |
- * Club domestic league appearances and goals as of 07:29, 20 June 2016 (UTC) ‡ National team caps and goals as of 15:39, 17 April 2018 (UTC)

Myron Samuel (born 19 December 1992) is a Vincentian international footballer who last played for Seattle Sounders FC 2 in the USL. Samuel is one of the youngest players to play and to score for Saint Vincent and the Grenadines.

== Club career ==
Samuel played for Vincentian NLA Premier League clubs System 3 FC in 2009 and Avenues United FC from 2009 to 2013, and Rendezvous FC of the Barbados Premier Division from 2013 to 2015. He scored 14 goals in 2013, 25 goals in 2014, and 12 goals in 2015. On 7 June 2011, Samuel appeared in a reserve match for American side Seattle Sounders FC. On 18 August 2015, it was announced that he had returned to Seattle and signed for its reserve team in the United Soccer League, Seattle Sounders FC 2. He joined his national team strike partner Oalex Anderson and fellow Vincentian and Seattle manager Ezra Hendrickson who brought him to Seattle during his first stint in 2011. The next day, Samuel made his debut for the club, coming on as a second-half substitute. He went on to score two goals in the match, including the game-winner, as Seattle won 3–2 over the Colorado Springs Switchbacks FC. It was later revealed that Samuel had broken his foot in the same match and had undergone successful surgery and was undergoing rehabilitation. The player was expected to be out for 10 weeks, missing the remaining six games of the season, and possibly longer.

On 4 December 2015, it was announced that Samuel would return to S2 for the 2016 USL season, along with international teammate Oalex Anderson.

== International career ==
Samuel made his senior debut for Saint Vincent and the Grenadines in 2008 at the age of 18 during 2008 Caribbean Cup qualification. Samuel won the Golden Boot as top scorer during the 2015 Windward Islands Tournament with four goals and three matches as Saint Vincent and the Grenadines were crowned champions of the tournament for the first time.

=== International goals ===
Scores and results list Saint Vincent and the Grenadines' goal tally first.

| No | Date | Venue | Opponent | Score | Result | Competition |
|---|---|---|---|---|---|---|
| 1. | 17 September 2008 | Stade Louis Achille, Fort-de-France, Martinique | Anguilla | 3–1 | 3–1 | 2008 Caribbean Cup qualification |
| 2. | 10 September 2010 | George Odlum Stadium, Vieux Fort, Saint Lucia | Saint Lucia | ?–0 | 5–1 | Friendly |
| 3. | 10 September 2010 | George Odlum Stadium, Vieux Fort, Saint Lucia | Saint Lucia | ?–0 | 5–1 | Friendly |
| 4. | 18 September 2011 | Arnos Vale Stadium, Kingstown, Saint Vincent and the Grenadines | Grenada | 1–0 | 2–1 | 2014 FIFA World Cup qualification |
| 5. | 15 October 2011 | Grenada National Stadium, St. George's, Grenada | Grenada | 1–0 | 1–1 | 2014 FIFA World Cup qualification |
| 6. | 1 September 2012 | Arnos Vale Stadium, Kingstown, Saint Vincent and the Grenadines | Barbados | 1–0 | 2–0 | Friendly |
| 7. | 21 October 2012 | Beausejour Stadium, Gros Islet, Saint Lucia | Guyana | 1–0 | 2–1 | 2012 Caribbean Cup qualification |
| 8. | 25 October 2012 | Beausejour Stadium, Gros Islet, Saint Lucia | Curaçao | 3–0 | 4–0 | 2012 Caribbean Cup qualification |
| 9. | 14 November 2012 | Dwight Yorke Stadium, Bacolet, Trinidad and Tobago | Trinidad and Tobago | 1–1 | 1–1 | 2012 Caribbean Cup qualification |
| 10. | 5 September 2014 | Antigua Recreation Ground, St. Johns, Antigua and Barbuda | Anguilla | 1–0 | 4–0 | 2014 Caribbean Cup qualification |
| 11. | 21 September 2014 | A. O. Shirley Recreation Ground, Road Town, British Virgin Islands | British Virgin Islands | 1–0 | 6–0 | Friendly |
| 12. | 8 October 2014 | Stade René Serge Nabajoth, Les Abymes, Guadeloupe | Guadeloupe | 1–1 | 1–3 | 2014 Caribbean Cup qualification |
| 13. | 12 May 2015 | Philip Marcellin Grounds, Vieux Fort, Saint Lucia | Grenada | 2–1 | 5–1 | 2015 Windward Islands Tournament |
| 14. | 12 May 2015 | Philip Marcellin Grounds, Vieux Fort, Saint Lucia | Grenada | 3–2 | 5–1 | 2015 Windward Islands Tournament |
| 15. | 14 May 2015 | Philip Marcellin Grounds, Vieux Fort, Saint Lucia | Saint Lucia | 2–1 | 2–1 | 2015 Windward Islands Tournament |
| 16. | 16 May 2015 | Philip Marcellin Grounds, Vieux Fort, Saint Lucia | Dominica | 1–0 | 1–0 | 2015 Windward Islands Tournament |
| 17. | 14 June 2015 | Providence Stadium, Providence, Guyana | Guyana | 1–0 | 4–4 | 2018 FIFA World Cup qualification |
| 18. | 25 March 2016 | Arnos Vale Stadium, Kingstown, Saint Vincent and the Grenadines | Trinidad and Tobago | 1–0 | 2–3 | 2018 FIFA World Cup qualification |
| 19. | 4 June 2016 | André Kamperveen Stadion, Paramaribo, Suriname | Suriname | 1–0 | 1–2 | 2017 Caribbean Cup qualification |
| 20. | 3 July 2017 | Kirani James Athletic Stadium, St. George's, Grenada | Grenada | 3–4 | 3–4 | 2017 Windward Islands Tournament |
| 21. | 4 July 2017 | Kirani James Athletic Stadium, St. George's, Grenada | Barbados | 2–2 | 4–2 | 2017 Windward Islands Tournament |
| 22. | 4 July 2017 | Kirani James Athletic Stadium, St. George's, Grenada | Barbados | 3–2 | 4–2 | 2017 Windward Islands Tournament |
| 23. | 4 July 2017 | Kirani James Athletic Stadium, St. George's, Grenada | Barbados | 4–2 | 4–2 | 2017 Windward Islands Tournament |

== Personal life ==
He is the cousin of fellow Vincentian international footballer Shandel Samuel. He was arrested in June 2021 in St. Vincent for weapons possession.
