= Reid Klopp =

US-born US Virgin Islands soccer player

Personal information
- Full name: Reid William Klopp
- Date of birth: June 2, 1984 (age 42)
- Place of birth: Salisbury, Maryland, United States
- Height: 5 ft 11 in (1.80 m)
- Position: Midfielder

Youth career
- Parkside High School

Senior career*
Years	Team	Apps	(Gls)
2002–2005	Salisbury Sea Gulls	78	(13)
2010–	Free Will Baptist		

International career^{‡}
2011–2012	US Virgin Islands	5	(2)
- * Club domestic league appearances and goals ‡ National team caps and goals as of 00:03, 27 June 2021 (UTC)

Reid Klopp (born 2 June 1984 in Salisbury) is a US-born US Virgin Islands soccer player, who currently plays for Free Will Baptist.

== Club career ==
He started playing soccer at Parkside High School in Salisbury, Maryland and played 4 years of college soccer for Salisbury Sea Gulls. Since moving to the Virgin Islands for his work at a Christian outreach for school kids called Free Will Baptist. He plays in the local soccer league for a team that represents the Free Will Baptist organization.

== International career ==
He made his debut for the US Virgin Islands in a July 2011 World Cup qualification match against the British Virgin Islands in which he immediately scored. He was also on the scoresheet in the reverse, making history in the process since it was the first time the US Virgin Islands reached the next round in World Cup qualification.

=== International goals ===
Scores and results list US Virgin Islands's goal tally first, score column indicates score after each Klopp goal.

#	Date	Venue	Opponent	Score	Result	Competition	Reference
1.	3 July 2011	Lionel Roberts Park, Charlotte Amalie, US Virgin Islands	British Virgin Islands	1 – 0	2–0	2014 FIFA World Cup qualification	
2.	10 July 2011	Sherly Ground, Road Town, British Virgin Islands	British Virgin Islands	2 – 1	2–1	2014 FIFA World Cup qualification	

== See also ==
- List of top international men's football goalscorers by country
