= Melanius Mullarkey =

Saint Lucian footballer

Personal information
- Full name: Melanius Daniel Mullarkey
- Date of birth: 11 January 1992 (age 34)
- Place of birth: Saint Lucia
- Position: Defender

Youth career
- 2007–2013: Birmingham City

Senior career*
Years	Team	Apps	(Gls)
2013	Rugby Town	9	(0)
2013–2015	AEL Limassol		
2015	Kettering Town	1	(0)
2015	Corby Town		
2016	Boston United		
2016	Gresley	3	(0)
2016	Leicester Nirvana		
2017–2018	Hayes & Yeading United	5	(0)
2018	Strumska Slava	2	(0)
2018–2019	Hinckley	4	(0)
2019	Wolverhampton Sporting	4	(0)
2019–2020	Ilkeston Town		
2020	Bromsgrove Sporting	0	(0)
2020–2021	Redditch United		
2021	Bangor City	9	(2)
2022	Bala Town		

International career^{‡}
2015–	Saint Lucia	7	(1)
- * Club domestic league appearances and goals as of 10:00, 19 November 2020 (UTC) ‡ National team caps and goals as of 10:00, 19 November 2020 (UTC)

Melanius Daniel Mullarkey (born 11 January 1992) is a Saint Lucian footballer capped by the Saint Lucia national team. He plays as a defender.

== Early life ==
Mullarkey was born on the island of Saint Lucia. His family is from Soufriere and central Castries. His family moved to the United Kingdom in 2002 when he was 10 years old. It was at this time that he gained an interest in football.

== Club career ==
Mullarkey soon began playing in the local Sunday leagues. He was scouted by Birmingham City and stayed with the club's academy for five years before moving to Coventry City. Following his departure from Coventry City, Mullarkey traveled to Cyprus to play for AEL Limassol. He returned to the United Kingdom the following year and has played for numerous non-league clubs since then. In 2015 he had a short trial stint with Cork City of the League of Ireland Premier Division.

Mullarkey signed for Southern League Premier Division Central side Bromsgrove Sporting on 5 September 2020, following a successful trial period. Melanius then signed for fellow Southern League Premier Division Central side Redditch United on 23 October 2020 He was released by the club in May 2021.

In August 2021 he joined Cymru North side Bangor City. He left the club in December 2021 after they were suspended from Welsh domestic football. In January 2022 he joined Cymru Premier team Bala Town.

== International career ==
Mullarkey made his senior international debut for Saint Lucia on 16 May 2015 in a 2015 Windward Islands Tournament match against Grenada. He then competed in the team's 2018 FIFA World Cup qualification matches against Antigua and Barbuda the following month.

He was then recalled to the squad for the 2017 Windward Islands Tournament and scored his first international goal in the team's opening match, a 2–1 victory over the Saint Vincent and the Grenadines.

About representing Saint Lucia, Mullarkey said, "I wanted to play for Saint Lucia because it's my hometown, I love my country from the bottom of my heart and playing and representing them is the best thing that will ever happen to me."

== Career statistics ==
=== International ===
As of match played 16 October 2018

National team	Year	Apps	Goals
Saint Lucia	2015	3	0
Saint Lucia	2017	3	1
Saint Lucia	2018	1	0
Total		7	1
