= Trevor Peters =

Personal information
- Full name: Trevor Deshawn Peters
- Date of birth: 19 March 1989 (age 37)
- Place of birth: Santo Domingo, Dominican Republic
- Height: 1.80 m (5 ft 11 in)
- Position: Striker

College career
| Years | Team | Apps | (Gls) |
- Cloud County Thunderbirds
- Tabor Bluejays

Senior career*
| Years | Team | Apps | (Gls) |
| 2010–2014 | Virgin Gorda Ballstars | | |
| 2018– | Rebels FC | | |

International career^{‡}
| 2010– | British Virgin Islands | 19 | (1) |
- * Club domestic league appearances and goals as of 7 February 2020 ‡ National team caps and goals as of 7 February 2020

Trevor Deshawn Peters (born 19 March 1989) is a British Virgin Islander footballer who plays as a striker for Rebels FC.

== International career ==
He made his debut for the British Virgin Islands in an October 2010 17–0 defeat to the Dominican Republic. Peters scored his first international goal in the 2–1 loss to US Virgin Islands on 10 July 2011.

== Career statistics ==
=== International ===
As of match played 14 November 2019

| National team | Year | Apps | Goals |
|---|---|---|---|
| British Virgin Islands | 2010 | 3 | 0 |
| British Virgin Islands | 2011 | 2 | 1 |
| British Virgin Islands | 2012 | 3 | 0 |
| British Virgin Islands | 2014 | 3 | 0 |
| British Virgin Islands | 2015 | 2 | 0 |
| British Virgin Islands | 2016 | 2 | 0 |
| British Virgin Islands | 2018 | 1 | 0 |
| British Virgin Islands | 2019 | 3 | 0 |
| Total | | 19 | 1 |

=== International goals ===
Scores and results list British Virgin Islands' goal tally first.

| No. | Date | Venue | Opponent | Score | Result | Competition |
|---|---|---|---|---|---|---|
| 1. | 10 July 2011 | A. O. Shirley Recreation Ground, Road Town, British Virgin Islands | U.S. Virgin Islands | 1–1 | 1–2 | 2014 FIFA World Cup Qualifying |
