= Lisdon Jules =

Grenadian footballer

Personal information
- Date of birth: 11 March 1990 (age 36)
- Place of birth: Grenada
- Positions: Forward; defender

Team information
- Current team: Hard Rock

Senior career*
Years	Team	Apps	(Gls)
2013–	Hard Rock		

International career^{‡}
2013–	Grenada	6	(1)
- * Club domestic league appearances and goals as of 4:23, 24 October 2017 (UTC) ‡ National team caps and goals as of 4:23, 24 October 2017 (UTC)

Lisdon Jules (born 11 March 1990) is a Grenadian footballer who plays as a forward for Hard Rock in the Grenadian Premier Division and the Grenada national team.

== International career ==
Jules earned his first international cap at the 2013 Windward Islands Tournament, scoring once during a 2–1 victory over Saint Lucia. He made one more appearance in the competition, against Saint Vincent and the Grenadines. Grenada were the eventual champions. He was also called up for the 2014 Windward Islands Tournament, and featured in two games.

He subsequently made two more appearances at the 2014 Caribbean Cup qualifiers, in matches against French Guiana and Puerto Rico.

In 2017, Jules was selected to represent national team yet again, ahead of friendlies against Trinidad and Tobago and Bermuda, although he stayed on the bench during both matches.

== Honours ==
=== Club ===
Hard Rock

- GFA Premier Division: 2013, 2016

=== International ===
Grenada

- Windward Islands Tournament: 2013

== Career statistics ==
As of match played 16 June 2017.

National team	Year	Apps	Goals
Saint Lucia	2013	2	1
Saint Lucia	2014	4	0
Saint Lucia	2015	0	0
Saint Lucia	2016	0	0
Saint Lucia	2017	0	0
Total		6	1

=== International goals ===
Scores and results list Grenada's goal tally first.

No	Date	Venue	Opponent	Score	Result	Competition
1.	23 April 2013	Victoria Park, Kingstown, Saint Vincent and the Grenadines	Saint Lucia	1–1	2–1	2013 Windward Islands Tournament
