= Jaylee Hodgson =

Montserratian footballer

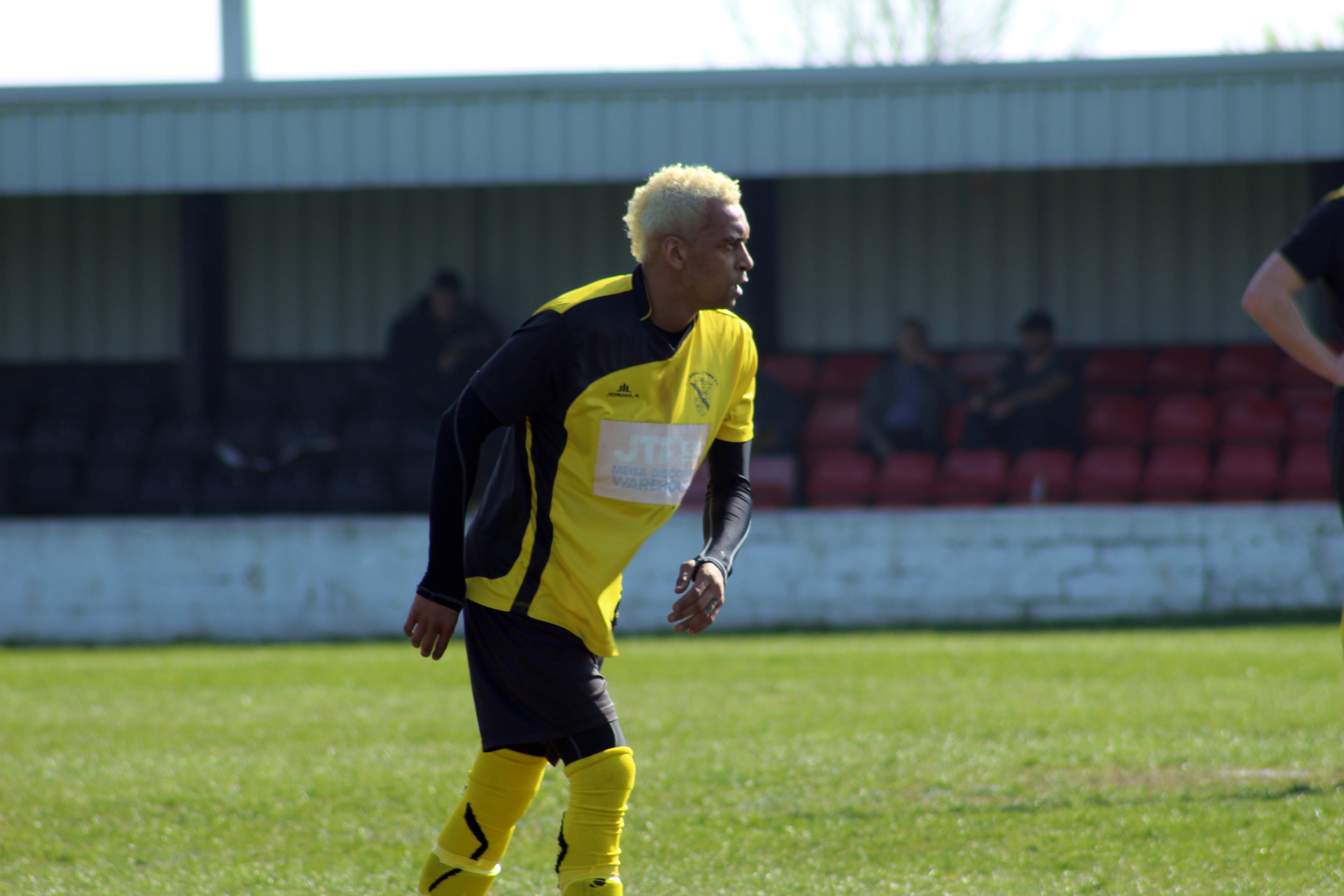

Personal information
- Full name: Jaylee Hodgson
- Date of birth: 5 June 1980 (age 46)
- Place of birth: Nottingham, England
- Position: Striker

Senior career*
Years	Team	Apps	(Gls)
–2010	Heanor Town		
2010	Long Eaton United	9	(0)
2010–2011	Loughborough Dynamo	15	(7)
2011	Hinckley United	3	(0)
2011	Belper Town	2	(0)
2011–201?	Shepshed Dynamo		
2012	Greenwood Meadows		
2012	Dunkirk	9	(0)
- Clifton All Whites
2015	Williamstown SC	7	(0)
2016–2017	Hucknall Town	21	(13)

International career
2011–2014	Montserrat	7	(4)
- * Club domestic league appearances and goals

Jaylee Hodgson (born 5 June 1980) is an English-born Montserratian former footballer who played as a striker. He has been capped internationally for Montserrat.

== Career ==
=== Club career ===
Hodgson played for Long Eaton United, who he joined from Heanor Town in September 2010. He made 11 appearances in all competitions for the club before leaving in October, subsequently joining Loughborough Dynamo while also playing Sunday league football for Clumber FC. In January 2011, Hodgson scored a hat-trick in 19 minutes for Clumber, as they beat Plough Barfly 7–1. In 25 appearances for Clumber, Hodgson scored 42 goals. Hodgson made 15 appearances for Loughborough Dynamo, scoring seven goals at the end of the 2010–11 season.

At the start of the 2011–12 season, Hodgson had a trial with Conference North club Boston United, playing in the second half in their 3–3 pre-season friendly game away at Arnold Town on 12 July 2011. Hodgson signed for Conference North club Hinckley United in August 2011, having impressed while on trial with the club. During his trial spell, Hodgson scored in a 3–0 win over Quorn in a pre-season friendly. In September 2011, he was released by Hinckley, subsequently joining Northern Premier League Division One South club Belper Town. He made his debut in the 2–0 away loss to Sutton Coldfield Town on 17 September, replacing Lee Morris as a substitute in the 55th minute. He then joined Shepshed Dynamo on 30 September.

Hodgson played at Clifton All Whites during the 2013–14 season.

In 2015, Hodgson moved to Australia and joined his international teammate Darryl Roach at State League 3 North-West side Williamstown SC.

Hodgson was released by Hucknall Town in August 2017.

=== International career ===
Hodgson was called up to the Montserrat national football team in 2011, for their 2014 FIFA World Cup CONCACAF first round qualifiers against Belize. He made his debut against Belize on 15 June, in their home fixture, which was played at Ato Boldon Stadium in Couva, Trinidad and Tobago. Montserrat lost 5–2, with Hodgson scoring both goals. Hodgson scored again in the away tie which was at held at Estadio Olímpico Metropolitano in San Pedro Sula, Honduras, but could not prevent Montserrat losing 3–1 and overall 8–3 on aggregate.

=== International goals ===
Montserrat's goals will always appear first

#	Date	Venue	Opponent	Score	Result	Competition
1.	15 June 2011	Ato Boldon Stadium, Couva, Trinidad and Tobago	Belize	1–1	2–5	2014 FIFA World Cup qualification
2.	15 June 2011	Ato Boldon Stadium, Couva, Trinidad and Tobago	Belize	2–5	2–5	2014 FIFA World Cup qualification
3.	17 July 2011	Estadio Olímpico Metropolitano, San Pedro Sula, Honduras	Belize	1–1	1–3	2014 FIFA World Cup qualification
4.	30 May 2014	Blakes Estate Stadium, Lookout, Montserrat	U.S. Virgin Islands	1–0	1–0	2014 Caribbean Cup qualification
