= Hoppers Crossing SC =

Football club in Victoria, Australia

- Full name: Hoppers Crossing SC
- Nickname: The Reds
- Founded: 1971
- Ground: Grange Reserve
- Capacity: 1,000
- President: Jess Smart
- Coach: Reardo Luka
- Assistant Coach: Vito Chichello
- League: Victorian State League Division 3 N/W
- 2024: 12th (relegated)
- Website: http://www.hopperscrossingsc.com.au
Home colours	Away colours

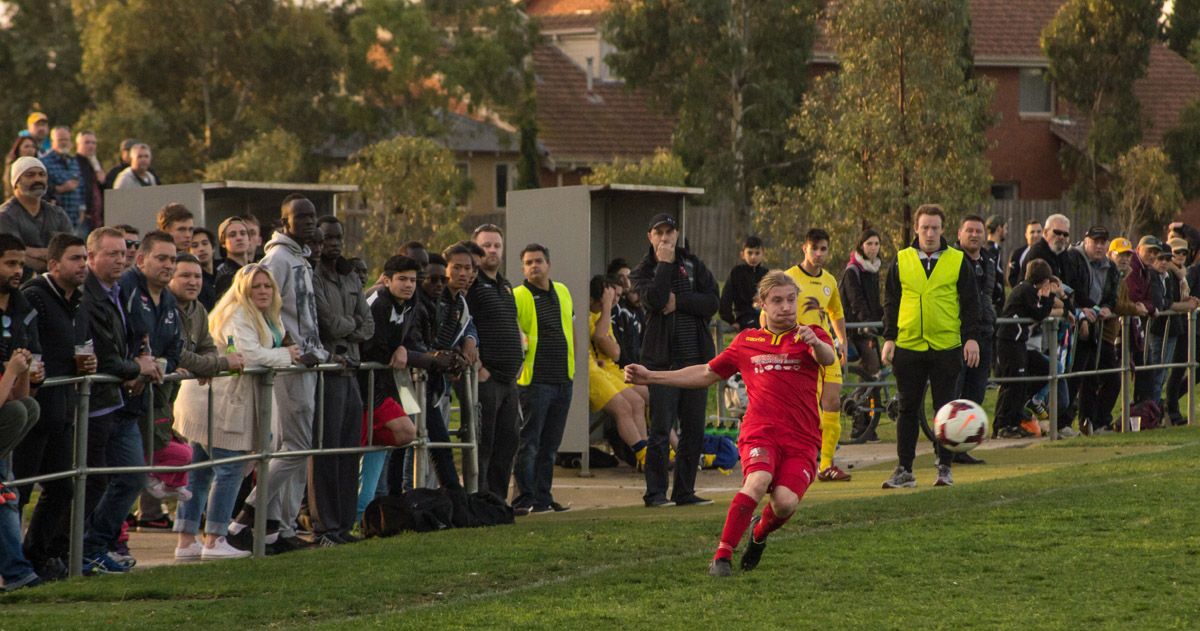
Matchday at Grange Reserve as the crowd watches on

Hoppers Crossing SC is a football (soccer) club based in Hoppers Crossing, Victoria, Australia. The club was formerly known as the Mossfiel Rangers Soccer Club which was formed by club founders Ken Slack, Ray Wilkinson, Stan Walkden and Ron Tutchell in 1971.

In 1991, the club changed its name to gain a closer affiliation with the quickly growing Hoppers Crossing area. Currently the club's senior men's team play in the Victorian State League Division 2 and women's teams play in the Victorian State League Division 1 North-West competition.

== History ==
Mossfiel Rangers Soccer club was formed in 1971 by Ken Slack, Ray Wilkinson, Stan Walkden and Ron Tutchell and only consisted of one Under 10 and one Under 11 boys team. The home ground was based on the site where the Karobran kindergarten now resides. The land was provided by shearer H.L. Baden Powell

In 1976, Mossfiel Rangers moved to Mossfiel Reserve, where they stayed until 2005 before moving to new facilities at Grange Reserve under the Hoppers Crossing Soccer Club name.

Between 1976 and 1978, senior football was played with teams entered into the District League West division. From 1979 to 1981, the senior teams played in the Amateur Leagues before moving into the Victorian Soccer Federations Provisional League 4.

In 1983, the club achieved its first promotion in its history by finishing in second place of Provisional League Div 4, followed by another successful year in 1987 – again finishing second in Provisional League 2.

1990 would see the club relegated for the first time in its history by finishing 14th in Provisional League 2 – where it would stay until the club's first senior championship was won in 1999. The 2nd club championship was won in 2001 which saw the club promoted into the Victorian Soccer Federations State League structure – only to last until 2004 where it was again relegated to the Provisional Leagues.

2012 saw the beginning of the club's most successful era, with the senior team winning championships in 2012 (Provisional League 2), 2014 State League 4 West and 2015 State League 3 North-West and finishing second in the 2017 State League 2 North-West competition. Hoppers Crossing were unable to hold their place in State League 1 NW in 2018, the first time in the club's history they had played in the state's third tier, finishing in second-bottom place.

== Women in football ==
In 2016, the club re-introduced senior women's football, establishing a team that won the State League 4 West Championship at its first attempt. In the semi-finals, Hoppers Crossing defeated Women's State League 4 North champions Meadow Park SC 4–0. The final was forfeited by Knox City FC, giving the title of overall FFV State League 4 Champions.

In 2017, The Lady Reds finished runners up in State League 3 West, earning a promotion play-off spot against North Runner-up Mill Park, which was won 6–4. The victory earned a sudden death play-off against the 3rd last team from 2nd Division – Yarraville Glory. With a huge buildup through the week, Yarraville forfeited the match which saw the Lady Reds promoted to Victorian State League Division 2 North/West in season 2018.

== Club name changes ==
- 1971 – Mossfiel Rangers Soccer Club
- 1991 – Hoppers Crossing Soccer Club

== Current Men's squad ==
Note: Flags indicate national team as defined under FIFA eligibility rules; some limited exceptions apply. Players may hold more than one non-FIFA nationality.

No.	Pos.	Nation	Player
1	GK	AUS	Stefaan Sardelic
29	GK	AUS	Kieron Sharratt
24	DF	AUS	Benjamin Sardelic
23	DF	AUS	Brian Chesson [Captain ]
3	DF	AUS	Dane Garbett
2	DF	KOR	Kyoungjin Jeong
4	DF	WAL	Morgan Filer
12	DF	AUS	Steven Smart
5	MF	PER	Andre Ruiz
7	MF	AUS	Kevin Smart
17	MF	AUS	Kwaku Dade
11	MF	AUS	Jason Hayne
18	MF	AUS	Matthew Scott
8	MF	AUS	Ryan Murray
33	MF	KOR	Kyung Min Shin
9	FW	AUS	Alister Smart
71	FW	AUS	Daniel Sweeney
10	FW	AUS	Simon Tolli
99	FW	MSR	Darryl Roach
6	FW	AUS	Liam Mcdermott
19	FW	AUS	Hope Mirindi

== Current Women's squad ==
Note: Flags indicate national team as defined under FIFA eligibility rules; some limited exceptions apply. Players may hold more than one non-FIFA nationality.

No.	Pos.	Nation	Player
1	GK	AUS	Sofia Alvarenga
2	DF	AUS	Naomi Loau
3	DF	AUS	Brianne Campana
4	DF	AUS	Kathryn Larkin
5	MF	AUS	Nermina Demirovic
6	MF	NZL	Kelly Black
7	FW	AUS	Deby Taylor
8	FW	BRA	Juliane Alburquerque
9	MF	AUS	Sara Demirovic
10	FW	AUS	Leonora Wharehinga
11	MF	AUS	Christina Georgiou
12	MF	AUS	Yajaira Appeldorff
13	DF	AUS	Karly Rigg
14	FW	FRA	Margot Robinne
15	FW	AUS	Julia Budiongo
16	FW	AUS	Nyankor Joseph
17	MF	AUS	Ellie Bujupi
18	DF	AUS	Milka Lodiong
41	MF	FRA	Mylene Deschamps

== Honours ==
=== Club ===
==== Men ====
- Victorian State League Division 2

Runners-up (1): 2017

- Victorian State League Division 3

Champions (1): 2015

- Victorian State League Division 4

Champions (1): 2014

- Provisional League 1 North West

Champions (1): 2001,

- Provisional League 2 North West

Champions (2): 1999, 2012,

==== Women ====
- Victorian State League Division 4 West

Champions (1): 2016

- Victorian State League Division 3 West

Runners-up (1): 2017

==== Women ====
- Victorian State League Division 2 North/West

Champions (1): 2018

=== Individual ===
Provisional League 3 Player of the Year

- 1984 – Nat Little

Provisional League 2 Player of the Year

- 1987 – Jimmy Leonard

Provisional League 1 Player of the Year

- 1988 – Jimmy Leonard

Provisional League 2 North West Player of the Year

- 1999 – Dragi Mitrevski and Scott Murray

Provisional League 1 North West Top Goalscorer

- 1999 – Dragi Mitrevski – 18 goals

Provisional League 1 North West Player of the Year

- 2001 – Ken Smart

Provisional League 1 North West Top Goalscorer

- 2006 – Robert Nedlekov – 25 goals

Provisional League 2 North West Player of the Year Player of the Year

- 2012 – Zia Sherzai

Provisional League 2 North West Top Goalscorer

- 2012 – Alister Smart – 23 goals

Victorian State League Division 4 Player of the Year

- 2014 – Zia Sherzai
