= Kurt Hector =

Dominica football manager

Kirt Hector
Personal information
- Full name: Kirt Anthony Hector
- Date of birth: 3 January 1972
- Place of birth: La Plaine, Dominica
- Date of death: 19 April 2013 (aged 41)
- Place of death: Pond Casse, Dominica

Managerial career
- Years: Team
- 2010–2013: Dominica

Kirt Hector (3 January 1972 – 19 April 2013), was a Dominica professional football manager.

Since August 2010 until April 2013 he is a head coach of the Dominica national football team. He lost his life in a road collision in Pond Casse in the early hours of 19 April 2013. With him were Dominican international footballers Norran Jno Hope and Joslyn Prince, only Prince survived. The trio were travelling to the airport to head to St. Vincent where they would participate in the 2013 Windward Islands Tournament.
