= George Odlum Stadium =

Stadium in Vieux Fort, Saint Lucia

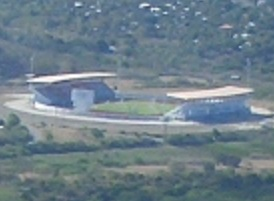
- Aerial view of the stadium

- Location within Saint Lucia
- Former names: National Stadium (2002–2007)
- Location: Vieux Fort, Saint Lucia
- Coordinates: 13.753105°N 60.943909°W
- Owner: Government of Saint Lucia
- Capacity: 9,000
- Surface: Grass
- Record attendance: 8,000 (Saint Lucia vs Jamaica, 11 August 2002)

Construction
- Opened: 1 July 2002; 24 years ago
- Renovated: 2009, 2026–present
- Cost: EC$58 million

Tenant
- Saint Lucia national football team (2002–present)

The George Odlum Stadium is a 9,000 capacity football stadium in Vieux Fort, Saint Lucia. Named after Saint Lucian politician George Odlum.

The stadium was handed over to the Government and people of Saint Lucia, represented by Prime Minister Honourable Dr. Kenny Anthony and Minister for Education, Human Resource Development, Youth and Sports, Honourable Mario Michel, in July 2002. Its construction was financed by the People's Republic of China. It was given its current name in 2007.

== Location ==
The stadium is located on a wide plain in St Urbain, at the foot of Morne Beausejour in the southern community of Vieux Fort. It is approximately five minutes away from the main population centre in the south of Saint Lucia, and virtually a stone's throw from the Hewanorra International Airport. The stadium is approximately 45 minutes away from the capital, Castries.

== Development and history ==
The National Stadium was one of several projects negotiated by then Minister for Foreign Affairs and International Trade, George Odlum. Preparatory work on the site was undertaken over several months by the Government of Saint Lucia at a cost of Three Million Eastern Caribbean Dollars (EC$3 million), just over US$1 million. In September 2000, the site was handed over to a Chinese construction company, the China National Overseas Engineering Corporation(COVEC).

Over the course of the next two years, COVEC built the stadium superstructure on part of the site, with two spectator stands, a grass field, a rubberized track, lights and large parking areas. Coming in at a total cost of EC$55 million, the stadium was the most modern in the Caribbean at the time of its construction. One of the first events at the stadium, then simply known as the Saint Lucia National Stadium, was the multi-discipline Windward Islands Secondary School Games.

Modern as it is in terms of layout, seating, fixtures and amenities, the stadium was not equipped with an IAAF-certified competition surface. By 2009, such a surface would prove necessary if the St Lucia Athletics Association were to prove successful in its bid to host the XXXVIII CARIFTA Games, a regional track and field championship featuring hundreds of athletes from over 20 territories. Prime Minister Honourable Stephenson King pledged Government's support.

By this time, Saint Lucia had broken off diplomatic relations with mainland China, in favour of links with Taiwan. Starting in late 2008, the Saint Lucia Government scrapped the old running surface, and along with Taiwan, began work rehabilitating the facility, which had suffered through substantial disuse and neglect. The major addition was the installation of an IAAF-certified Mondo track. Total expenditure on the Stadium came to over EC$10 million.

Of that amount, though, more than EC$5 million was spent on support systems and infrastructure. The Government of Saint Lucia never managed to fix the electronic scoreboard, but work was done to install a new photo finish apparatus, repair damaged seating, upgrade the lighting, drainage and plumbing, fix the roof and purchase new equipment. Purchased in collaboration with the Taiwanese, much of the equipment came from major American manufacturer UCS.

== CARIFTA 2009 ==
Minister of Youth, Sports, Social Transformation and Public Service, Honourable Lenard Montoute – a former national athlete himself – worked closely with local contractors and of course Mondo, IAAF Official Supplier since 1987, to bring the facility fully up to international standard. Permanent Secretary Donavan Williams headed the team that was charged with delivering the XXXVIII CARIFTA Games in Easter 2009, when the Caribbean would descend upon Saint Lucia.

Saint Lucia delivered. Adjustments had to be made to the programme to account for transportation from the main tourism belt in the island's north, but competition-wise, many considered this the best edition ever of the Caribbean's junior track and field showcase. 15 records were broken or equalled, one in the throws, three in the middle and long-distance events. Grenada's Kirani James broke Usain Bolt's 400m record, and won the Austin Sealy award for most outstanding athlete.

Neville 'Teddy' McCook, president of the North American, Central American and Caribbean Athletics Association(NACAC), was impressed by Saint Lucia's National Stadium. During a visit to Saint Lucia in September 2008, he said "This is an excellent facility. I see nothing in the region that compares in terms of availability of rooms and the way you can use those rooms. This is an important stadium with available rooms for medical, media, accommodation, that's excellent."

== Amenities and fittings ==
The National Stadium contains two spectator stands seating a total of eight thousand (8,000) persons. When handed over in 2002, the stated intention was that two other stands to accommodate a further seven thousand (7,000) persons would be constructed in due course by the Saint Lucian Government. The stadium was also intended to be the centerpiece of a stadium complex that would include accommodation as well as indoor facilities for court sports, meetings and so on.

As described by Donavan Williams, the refurbished facility includes "a warm up facility, two High Jump areas, four Triple Jump and Long Jump runways, two Pole Vault runways, one Discus Throw circle, two Shot Put circles and two Javelin Throw runways." Previously, there had been a warmup area beneath the stands, but this was replaced in the refurbishment. The stadium boasts a regulation football pitch and a 400m all-weather Mondo track.

== St Jude Hospital ==
In September 2009, a fire destroyed portions of St Jude Hospital in Vieux Fort, a few miles from the stadium. The Government of Saint Lucia moved the bulk of the hospital's operations to the stadium, where the large, flexible rooms beneath the stands turned out to be ideal for transformation into the main medical facility for the south of the island. In April 2010, Prime Minister Stephenson King said that his government would be rebuilding St Jude on a site close to the stadium.

The Ministries of Sports and Health, along with the Saint Lucia Athletics Association and the board of St Jude, agreed that for the duration of the hospital's stay in the stadium, although the facility would not be available for competition, the track and field installations could be used for training. For much of the 2010 season, therefore, athletics meets were held at venues as disparate as the Mindoo Phillip Park in Castries or the mini-stadium in Soufrière.

As of August 2023, the bleachers are in poor condition as well as the roof, which has begun falling off. Instead, the faculty of the various schools have opted to use the sides of the tracks where students sit on cardboard or metal stands.
