= 1961 Windward Islands Tournament =

Tournament details
- Host country: Saint Lucia
- Dates: 15–20 January
- Teams: 4

Final positions
- Champions: Grenada
- Runners-up: Saint Vincent and the Grenadines

The 1961 Windward Islands Tournament was an international football tournament hosted in Saint Lucia in 1961.

== Final table ==
Pos	Team	Pld	W	D	L	GF	GA	GD	Pts
1	Grenada (C)	3	2	0	1	15	7	+8	4
2	Saint Vincent and the Grenadines	3	1	2	0	9	6	+3	4
3	Saint Lucia	3	1	1	1	6	7	−1	3
4	Dominica	3	0	1	2	3	13	−10	1

(C) Champions
