= Inoel Navarro =

Dominican footballer and beach soccer player

Personal information
- Full name: Inoel Navarro González
- Date of birth: 28 July 1987 (age 39)
- Place of birth: Hato Mayor del Rey, Dominican Republic
- Height: 1.73 m (5 ft 8 in)
- Position: Forward

Team information
- Current team: Las Malvinas (beach soccer)

Senior career*
Years	Team	Apps	(Gls)
2009–2011	Pantoja		
2012	Don Bosco		
2012–2014	Bauger FC	26	(6)
2015– 16	Atlético Pantoja	?	(0)
2017–	Universidad O&M FC		

International career^{‡}
- Dominican Republic U20
2010–	Dominican Republic	15	(7)
- * Club domestic league appearances and goals ‡ National team caps and goals as of 25 March 2015

Inoel Navarro González (born 28 July 1987) is a Dominican footballer who plays as a forward. He is also a beach soccer player for Las Malvinas FC as a pivot, and represented the Dominican Republic internationally in both football and beach soccer.

== International career ==
=== International goals ===
Scores and results list Dominican Republic's goal tally first.

No	Date	Venue	Opponent	Score	Result	Competition
1.	14 October 2010	Estadio Panamericano, San Cristóbal, Dominican Republic	British Virgin Islands	3–0	17–0	2010 Caribbean Cup qualification
2.	14 October 2010	Estadio Panamericano, San Cristóbal, Dominican Republic	British Virgin Islands	5–0	17–0	2010 Caribbean Cup qualification
3.	14 October 2010	Estadio Panamericano, San Cristóbal, Dominican Republic	British Virgin Islands	14–0	17–0	2010 Caribbean Cup qualification
4.	10 July 2011	Estadio Panamericano, San Cristóbal, Dominican Republic	Anguilla	1–0	4–0	2014 FIFA World Cup qualification
5.	10 July 2011	Estadio Panamericano, San Cristóbal, Dominican Republic	Anguilla	3–0	4–0	2014 FIFA World Cup qualification
6.	11 November 2011	Estadio Panamericano, San Cristóbal, Dominican Republic	Cayman Islands	1–0	4–0	2014 FIFA World Cup qualification
7.	12 October 2014	Ato Boldon Stadium, Couva, Trinidad and Tobago	Saint Lucia	3–1	3–2	2014 Caribbean Cup qualification
