= 2013 Windward Islands Tournament =

Tournament details
- Host country: Saint Vincent and the Grenadines
- Dates: 21–25 April 2013
- Teams: 4 (from 1 sub-confederation)
- Venue: 1 (in 1 host city)

Final positions
- Champions: Grenada (2nd title)
- Runners-up: Saint Lucia
- Third place: Saint Vincent and the Grenadines
- Fourth place: (Saint Vincent and the Grenadines) Football Federation President's XI

Tournament statistics
- Matches played: 6
- Goals scored: 14 (2.33 per match)
- Top scorer(s): (Saint Lucia) Jamil Joseph (2 goals)

The 2013 Windward Islands Tournament was an international football tournament between the Windward Islands nations, with the exception of Dominica, which was hosted by St. Vincent between 21 April and 25 April 2013. Matches took place at Victoria Park in Kingstown. The tournament was organised by the Windward Islands Football Association (WIFA) and received financial assistance from CONCACAF. It was the first time that the tournament has been held since 2001. After the three nations were eliminated from 2014 FIFA World Cup qualification and the 2013 CONCACAF Gold Cup, none of them were scheduled for any international matches. Therefore, the tournament was organized to assess current and future talent. After Dominica withdrew, they were replaced by a team compromised exclusively of players from the NLA Premier League organized by the Saint Vincent and the Grenadines Football Federation called the "President's XI."

Grenada won the tournament, beating Saint Vincent and the Grenadines in the final match of the tournament. Grenada only needed a draw to be named champions.

== Dominica withdrawal ==
Dominica was originally scheduled to take part in the tournament but withdrew on 19 April, only two days before the tournament began, after head coach Kurt Hector and defender Noran Jno Hope were killed in a car accident on the way to Melville Hall Airport to meet their other teammates to fly to St. Vincent. Tournament organizers decided to not cancel the tournament as a tribute. WIFA then released a revised schedule

== Fixtures ==
All times are local (UTC−4)

Team	Pld	W	D	L	GF	GA	GD	Pts
Grenada	3	2	0	1	4	3	+1	6
Saint Lucia	3	2	0	1	5	3	+2	6
Saint Vincent and the Grenadines	3	1	0	2	2	3	−1	3
(Saint Vincent and the Grenadines) Football Federation President's XI	3	1	0	2	3	5	−2	3

21 April 2013

Football Federation President's XI (Saint Vincent and the Grenadines)	2–1	Grenada
Small 27' (pen.); Slater 62'		Baptiste 39'

Victoria Park, Kingstown
Referee: Leo Clarke (Saint Lucia)
21 April 2013

Saint Vincent and the Grenadines	0–2	Saint Lucia
	Report	Charles 21'; Williams 80'

Victoria Park, Kingstown
Referee: Valman Bedeau (Grenada)

23 April 2013

Saint Vincent and the Grenadines	2–0	(Saint Vincent and the Grenadines) Football Federation President's XI
McDowall 27'; Solomon 57'	Report

Victoria Park, Kingstown
Referee: Vivian Robinson (Saint Lucia)
23 April 2013

Grenada	2–1	Saint Lucia
Jules 47'; Daniel 48'	Report	Joseph 32'

Victoria Park, Kingstown
Referee: Trevor Taylor (Barbados)

25 April 2013

Football Federation President's XI (Saint Vincent and the Grenadines)	1–2	Saint Lucia
Small 2'		Neptune 3'; Joseph 14'

Victoria Park, Kingstown
Referee: Valman Bedeau (Grenada)
25 April 2013

Saint Vincent and the Grenadines	0–1	Grenada
	Report	Daniel 76'

Victoria Park, Kingstown
Referee: Trevor Taylor (Barbados)

== Goal scorers ==
There were 14 goals scored in 6 matches, for an average of 2.33 goals per match.

2 goals

- (Saint Lucia) Jamil Joseph

1 goal

- (Grenada) Kwan Baptiste
- (Grenada) Denron Daniel
- (Grenada) Lisdon Jules
- (Grenada) Kimron Redhead
- (Saint Lucia) Eden Charles
- (Saint Lucia) Gerlanne Neptune
- (Saint Lucia) Pernal Williams
- (Saint Vincent and the Grenadines) Jolanshoy McDowall
- (Saint Vincent and the Grenadines) Tevin Slater
- (Saint Vincent and the Grenadines) Dominic Small
- (Saint Vincent and the Grenadines) Kevin Small
- (Saint Vincent and the Grenadines) Azhino Solomon
