= Jhoan Sánchez =

Dominican footballer

Johan Sánchez
Personal information
- Full name: Johan Ernesto Sánchez Morel
- Date of birth: 17 January 1989 (age 37)
- Place of birth: Jarabacoa, Dominican Republic
- Height: 5 ft 9 in (1.75 m)
- Position: Right back

Team information
- Current team: Georgia Gwinnett Grizzlies

Senior career*
Years	Team	Apps	(Gls)
2007–2009	Jarabacoa FC		
2010–2011	Tyler Apaches		
2012–2013	Georgia Gwinnett Grizzlies	35	(1)

International career^{‡}
2006–	Dominican Republic	6	(1)
- * Club domestic league appearances and goals as of 2 November 2013 ‡ National team caps and goals as of 30 August 2014

Johan Ernesto Sánchez Morel (born 17 January 1989 in Jarabacoa) is a Dominican footballer who plays as a defender. He played at the 2014 FIFA World Cup qualifier
