= Iran Cassius =

Saint Lucian footballer

Personal information
- Date of birth: 3 January 1985 (age 41)
- Position: Goalkeeper

Team information
- Current team: Humble Lions F.C.
- Number: 1

Senior career*
Years	Team	Apps	(Gls)
2012–	Humble Lions F.C.	3	(1)

International career^{‡}
2010–	Saint Lucia	11	(0)
- * Club domestic league appearances and goals ‡ National team caps and goals as of 10:11, 17 March 2012 (UTC)

Iran Cassius (born 3 January 1985) is an international football player from Saint Lucia, who plays as a goalkeeper.

== Career ==
He made his international debut for Saint Lucia in 2010 and has appeared in FIFA World Cup qualifying matches.
