= Windward Islands Football Association =

- Type: Sports organization
- Region served: Windward Islands
- Members: 4 member associations
- President: Venold Coombs
- General Secretary: Trevor Heath

Windward Islands Football Association (WIFA) is an association of the football playing nations in Windward Islands.

It is affiliated to CFU.

Its main tournament is the Windward Islands Tournament.

It has 4 members:

- Dominica
- Grenada
- Saint Lucia
- Saint Vincent and the Grenadines
