= Jason Belfon =

Grenadan association football player

Personal information
- Full name: Jason Kendell Belfon
- Date of birth: 3 July 1990 (age 36)
- Place of birth: Grenville, Grenada
- Height: 1.83 m (6 ft 0 in)
- Position: Goalkeeper

Senior career*
| Years | Team | Apps | (Gls) |
| 2013–2014 | Five Stars FC | | |
| 2015–2016 | Paradise FC International | | |
| 2016 | Club Sando F.C. | | |
| 2016–2017 | Paradise FC International | | |
| 2017–2020 | W Connection F.C. | | |
| 2020– | Paradise FC International | | |

International career^{‡}
- Grenada U17
| 2013– | Grenada | 53 | (0) |
- * Club domestic league appearances and goals ‡ National team caps and goals as of 26 October 2024

Jason Kendell Belfon (born 3 July 1990) is a footballer from Grenada who plays for Club Atlético Independiente Siguatepeque in the Honduran Liga de Ascenso.

== Career ==
=== Trinidad and Tobago ===
Testing for Club Sando of the Trinidadian TT Pro League in 2016, Belfon transferred to the club alongside three other Grenadians.

Inking a deal with 2013–14 TT Pro League champions W Connection in summer 2017, the Grenadian goalkeeper debuted for the 5-time TT Pro League titleholders in a 4–1 defeat to Defence Force.

=== International ===
For putting in what was seen as a coruscating performance for Grenada against Puerto Rico, Belfon was awarded as Man of the Match and is considered one of the best goalkeepers in the Caribbean.
