= Jamil Joseph =

Saint Lucian footballer (born 1991)

Personal information
- Date of birth: 17 January 1991 (age 35)
- Place of birth: Saint Lucia
- Height: 1.88 m (6 ft 2 in)
- Position: Striker

Team information
- Current team: Vieux Fort South

Senior career*
Years	Team	Apps	(Gls)
2009–2010	Vieux Fort South		
2010–2012	Thackley		
2012–2013	Root Alley Ballers		
2014	W Connection		
2015–2017	Platinum FC		
2018–	Vieux Fort South		

International career^{‡}
2011–2015	Saint Lucia	21	(5)
- * Club domestic league appearances and goals as of 28 November 2021 ‡ National team caps and goals as of 28 November 2021

Jamil Joseph (born 17 January 1991) is a Saint Lucian international footballer who plays club football for Vieux Fort South of the Saint Lucia Silver Division.

== Career ==
=== Club ===
Joseph has played club football in Saint Lucia for Vieux Fort South and in England for Thackley. In 2012, he, along with fellow-Saint Lucian Eden Charles, trialed at Carlisle United FC of League One as part of an agreement between the Saint Lucia Football Association and the club.

=== International ===
He made his international debut for Saint Lucia on July 8, 2011 in a 2014 FIFA World Cup qualification match against Aruba.

=== International goals ===
Scores and results list Saint Lucia's goal tally first. Excludes "non-official" international goals.

No.	Date	Venue	Opponent	Score	Result	Competition
1	12 July 2011	Mindoo Philip Park, Castries, Saint Lucia	Aruba	1–0	4–2 (AET)	2014 FIFA World Cup qualification
2	12 July 2011	Mindoo Philip Park, Castries, Saint Lucia	Aruba	2–0	4–2 (AET)	2014 FIFA World Cup qualification
3	12 July 2011	Mindoo Philip Park, Castries, Saint Lucia	Aruba	3–1	4–2 (AET)	2014 FIFA World Cup qualification
4	23 April 2013	Victoria Park, Kingstown, Saint Vincent and the Grenadines	Grenada	1–0	1–2	2013 Windward Islands Tournament
