= Dwayne Thomas =

United States Virgin Islands soccer player

Personal information
- Full name: Dwayne Virgil Thomas
- Date of birth: April 22, 1984 (age 42)
- Place of birth: US Virgin Islands
- Height: 1.76 m (5 ft 9 in)
- Position: Defender

Senior career*
| Years | Team | Apps | (Gls) |
| 2006–2008 | Helenites SC | | |
| 2008– | Skills | | |

International career
| 2002–2015 | US Virgin Islands | 15 | (1) |
- * Club domestic league appearances and goals

Dwayne Virgil Thomas (born April 22, 1984) is a US Virgin Islands soccer player who currently plays as a defender.
