= David Abdul =

Aruban footballer

Personal information
- Full name: David Abdul
- Date of birth: 17 August 1989 (age 37)
- Place of birth: Oranjestad, Aruba
- Height: 1.83 m (6 ft 0 in)
- Position: Striker

Team information
- Current team: Retire

Youth career
- Sparta Rotterdam

Senior career*
Years	Team	Apps	(Gls)
2008–2011	Sparta Rotterdam	15	(4)
2011–2012	RVVH		
2013	SV Dakota		

International career
2011–2015	Aruba	5	(1)
- * Club domestic league appearances and goals

David Abdul (born 17 August 1989) is an Aruban football player. Currently, he plays for SV Dakota and also features for the Aruba national team. In his early career, he played professionally for Sparta Rotterdam in the Dutch Eerste Divisie.

== Club career ==
Abdul is a forward player who graduated through the Sparta academy and reserve teams, making his first team debut on 18 January 2009, aged 19 years and 154 days. In 2011, Abdul was the highest paid athlete from Aruba at $65,312 (USD).

Abdul was mostly used as a substitute for Sparta in his first three seasons, playing 6 league matches in two seasons. After Sparta relegated in the 2009–10 season, he became a more regular starter in the club's Eerste Divisie campaign.

He left Sparta after the 2010/2011 season for amateur side RVVH. He later moved to Aruban Division di Honor side, SV Dakota

His brother Eric is a goalkeeper.

== International career ==
Abdul is capped by the Aruba national football team. He featured in both matches against St. Vincent and the Grenadines in the 2018 World Cup qualifiers.
