= Kevin Edward =

Saint Lucia association football player

Personal information
- Date of birth: 24 March 1991 (age 35)
- Place of birth: Vieux Fort, St. Lucia
- Position: Midfielder

Team information
- Current team: Platinum FC

Senior career*
Years	Team	Apps	(Gls)
2011–2018	Vieux Fort South		
2019–	Platinum FC		

International career^{‡}
2011–2013	Saint Lucia	10	(1)
- * Club domestic league appearances and goals as of 28 November 2021 ‡ National team caps and goals as of 28 November 2021

Kevin Edward (born 24 March 1991), is an international soccer player from Saint Lucia, who plays for Platinum FC as a midfielder.

== Career ==
He made his international debut for Saint Lucia in 2011 and has appeared in FIFA World Cup qualifying matches.
