= Nicko Williams =

Grenadian footballer

Personal information
- Date of birth: 24 October 1989 (age 37)
- Place of birth: River Sallee, Grenada
- Height: 1.91 m (6 ft 3 in)
- Position: Defender

Senior career*
Years	Team	Apps	(Gls)
2013	Hard Rock		
2013–2015	Waterhouse		
2015–2017	Hard Rock		

International career
2011–2017	Grenada	11	(2)
- * Club domestic league appearances and goals

Nicko Williams (born 24 October 1989) is a Grenadian footballer who has played as a defender for Waterhouse F.C., Hard Rock and the Grenada national football team.

== Club career ==
Williams has played for Hard Rock in Grenada and Waterhouse in Jamaica.

== International career ==
=== International goals ===
Scores and results list Grenada's goal tally first.

No	Date	Venue	Opponent	Score	Result	Competition
1.	4 May 2014	Windsor Park, Roseau, Dominica	Dominica	3–3	5–3	2014 Windward Islands Tournament
2.	3 July 2017	Kirani James Athletic Stadium, St. George's, Grenada	Grenada	1–0	4–3	2017 Windward Islands Tournament
