= Philip Marcellin Grounds =

- Location: Vieux-Fort
- Coordinates: 13.7289°N 60.9508°W

The Philip Marcellin Grounds are a soccer venue in St. Lucia. It has a capacity of 1,000.

In April 2015, it was announced as the venue for the 2015 Windward Islands Tournament after the Beausejour Stadium became unavailable.

The stadium is named after deceased goalkeeper Philip Marcellin.
