= Eden Charles =

Saint Lucian footballer

Personal information
- Date of birth: 29 October 1993 (age 32)
- Place of birth: Gros Islet, Saint Lucia
- Height: 1.86 m (6 ft 1 in)
- Position: Forward

Team information
- Current team: Monchy United

Senior career*
Years	Team	Apps	(Gls)
2009–2013	Northern United All Stars		
2013–2015	W Connection		
2015–2018	Northern United All Stars		
2019	Monchy United	9	(0)
2019–2020	Morvant Caledonia United		
2021–	Monchy United		

International career^{‡}
2011–	Saint Lucia	22	(4)
- * Club domestic league appearances and goals as of 17 November 2022 ‡ National team caps and goals as of 17 November 2022

Eden Charles (born 29 October 1993) is a Saint Lucian professional footballer who plays as a striker for Monchy United.

== Club career ==
Charles has played for Northern United All Stars of the Saint Lucia Gold Division since 2009. In 2012, he, along with fellow-Saint Lucian Jamil Joseph, trialed at Carlisle United FC of League One as part of an agreement between the Saint Lucia Football Association and the club.

In December 2013, it was announced that Charles would participate in the 2014 Caribbean Combine, with hopes of participating in the 2014 MLS SuperDraft. Charles then played in the TT Pro League in Trinidad & Tobago for W Connection.

== International career ==
He made his international debut for Saint Lucia on 12 July 2011 in a 2014 FIFA World Cup qualification match against Aruba and would score his first international goal in a 2012 Caribbean Cup qualifier against Curaçao.

=== International goals ===
Scores and results list Saint Lucia's goal tally first.

#	Date	Venue	Opponent	Score	Result	Competition
1	21 October 2012	Beausejour Stadium, Gros Islet	Curaçao	3–1	5–1	2012 Caribbean Cup qualifier
2	21 April 2013	Victoria Park, Kingstown	Saint Vincent and the Grenadines	1–0	2–0	2013 Windward Islands Tournament
3	30 November 2013	Windsor Park, Roseau	Dominica	1–0	1–0	Friendly
4	30 April 2014	Windsor Park, Roseau	Dominica	2–0	2–0	2014 Windward Islands Tournament
