= Lester Langlais =

Dominican footballer

Personal information
- Full name: Lester Langlais
- Date of birth: 21 February 1984 (age 42)
- Place of birth: Goodwill, Dominica
- Height: 1.77 m (5 ft 10 in)
- Position: Midfielder

International career^{‡}
Years	Team	Apps	(Gls)
2006–2014	Dominica	24	(1)
- ‡ National team caps and goals as of 6 June 2018

Lester Langlais (born 21 February 1984 in Dominica) is a footballer who plays as a midfielder for the Dominica national football team.
