= 2017 Windward Islands Tournament =

Tournament details
- Host country: Grenada
- Dates: 28 June–6 July 2017
- Teams: 5 (from 1 sub-confederation)
- Venues: 2 (in 2 host cities)

Final positions
- Champions: Grenada (3rd title)
- Runners-up: Dominica
- Third place: Saint Lucia
- Fourth place: Saint Vincent and the Grenadines

Tournament statistics
- Matches played: 10
- Goals scored: 31 (3.1 per match)
- Top scorer: (Saint Vincent and the Grenadines) Myron Samuel (4 goals)

The 2017 Windward Islands Tournament (2017 WIFA Men's Tournament) is an association football tournament that took place in Grenada. It is organised by the Windward Islands Football Association (WIFA).

Barbados were invited to take part in the tournament. It was the first time in four decades the national team had participated.

== Venues ==
St. George's	2017 Windward Islands Tournament is located in Grenada	Sauteurs
Kirani James Athletic Stadium	2017 Windward Islands Tournament is located in Grenada	Fond Playing Field
12.06°N 61.753611°W	2017 Windward Islands Tournament is located in Grenada	12.22462°N 61.64557°W

== Standings ==
Pos	Team	Pld	W	D	L	GF	GA	GD	Pts
1	Grenada (H)	4	2	1	1	7	6	+1	7
2	Dominica	4	1	3	0	5	4	+1	6
3	St. Lucia	4	1	2	1	3	4	−1	5
4	St. Vincent and the Grenadines	4	1	1	2	10	10	0	4
5	Barbados (G)	4	1	1	2	6	7	−1	4

Source: Grenada FA
(G) Guests; (H) Hosts

== Matches ==
28 June 2017
17:30

St. Lucia	2–1	St. Vincent and the Grenadines
Mullarkey 74'; Frederick 80'	Report	Cunningham 89'

Kirani James Athletic Stadium, St. George's
Referee: Rhomie Blanc (Dominica)
28 June 2017
19:30

Grenada	1–1	Dominica
Phillip 74'	Report	Wade 14'

Kirani James Athletic Stadium, St. George's
Referee: Moeth Gaynes (Saint Vincent and the Grenadines)

30 June 2017
17:30

Dominica	2–1	Barbados
Wade 22'; Walters 52'	Report	Jules 41'

Fond Playing Field, Sauteurs
Referee: Moeth Gaynes (Saint Vincent and the Grenadines)
30 June 2017
19:30

Grenada	2–0	St. Lucia
Rennie 44'; John-Brown 51'	Report

Fond Playing Field, Sauteurs
Referee: Gillian Martindale (Barbados)

3 July 2017
15:00

Barbados	1–1	St. Lucia
Edmee 72'	Report	Frederick 35'

Kirani James Athletic Stadium, St. George's
Referee: Moeth Gaynes (Saint Vincent and the Grenadines)
3 July 2017
17:00

Grenada	4–3	St. Vincent and the Grenadines
Williams 14'; Lewis 32', 54'; Phillip 56'	Report	Cunningham 44'; Sutherland 63'; Samuel 88'

Kirani James Athletic Stadium, St. George's
Referee: Gillian Martindale (Barbados)

4 July 2017
17:30

St. Vincent and the Grenadines	4–2	Barbados
Cunningham 12'; Samuel 47', 55', 90'	Report	Holligan 6'; Harte 44'

Kirani James Athletic Stadium, St. George's
Referee: Rhomie Blanc (Dominica)
4 July 2017
19:30

St. Lucia	0–0	Dominica
	Report

Kirani James Athletic Stadium, St. George's
Referee: Cecil Hinds (Trinidad and Tobago)

6 July 2017
17:30

Dominica	2–2	St. Vincent and the Grenadines
Wade 26' (pen.); Thomas 56'	Report	D. Prescott 29'; Lee 44'

Kirani James Athletic Stadium, St. George's
Referee: Gillian Martindale (Barbados)
6 July 2017
19:30

Grenada	0–2	Barbados
		Edmee 8'; Harte 65'

Kirani James Athletic Stadium, St. George's
Referee: Cecil Hinds (Trinidad and Tobago)

== Goal scorers ==
There were 31 goals scored in 10 matches, for an average of 3.1 goals per match.

4 goals

- (Saint Vincent and the Grenadines) Myron Samuel

3 goals

- (Dominica) Julian Wade
- (Saint Vincent and the Grenadines) Chavel Cunningham

2 goals

- (Barbados) Zico Edmee
- (Barbados) Mario Harte
- (Grenada) Saydrel Lewis
- (Grenada) Rickson Phillip
- (Saint Lucia) Kurt Frederick

1 goal

- (Barbados) Hadan Holligan
- (Barbados) Rashad Jules
- (Dominica) Briel Thomas
- (Dominica) Kelrick Walters
- (Grenada) Shavon John-Brown
- (Grenada) Jake Rennie
- (Grenada) Nicko Williams
- (Saint Lucia) Melanius Mullarkey
- (Saint Vincent and the Grenadines) Zenroy Lee
- (Saint Vincent and the Grenadines) Dennis Prescott
- (Saint Vincent and the Grenadines) Jahvin Sutherland
