= Denron Daniel =

Grenadian Association footballer

Denron Daniel Frederick
Personal information
- Full name: Denron Daniel Frederick
- Date of birth: 14 March 1989 (age 37)
- Position: Forward

Team information
- Current team: Shamrock FC

Senior career*
Years	Team	Apps	(Gls)
- Hard Rock

International career^{‡}
2009–	Grenada	13	(5)
- * Club domestic league appearances and goals as of 08:55, 31 July 2009 (UTC) ‡ National team caps and goals as of 17 May 2017

Denron Daniel (born 14 March 1989) is a Grenadian professional footballer who plays as a forward. He has also represented the Grenada national football team.

Daniel scored five goals for Grenada under-20s in their 17–0 win over the British Virgin Islands in their 2009 CONCACAF U-20 Championship qualifier match in May 2008.

He made his international debut for Grenada against United States on 7 April 2009. In his second appearances for Grenada, he scored his first international goal against Saint Vincent and the Grenadines.

== International career ==
=== International goals ===
Scores and results list Grenada's goal tally first.

No	Date	Venue	Opponent	Score	Result	Competition
1.	23 April 2013	Victoria Park, Kingstown, Saint Vincent and the Grenadines	Saint Lucia	2–1	2–1	2013 Windward Islands Tournament
2.	25 April 2013	Victoria Park, Kingstown, Saint Vincent and the Grenadines	Saint Vincent and the Grenadines	1–0	1–0	2013 Windward Islands Tournament
3.	7 September 2013	Windsor Park, Roseau, Dominica	Dominica	4–3	5–3	2014 Windward Islands Tournament
4.	7 September 2013	Windsor Park, Roseau, Dominica	Dominica	5–3	5–3	2014 Windward Islands Tournament
5.	29 April 2017	Kirani James National Stadium, St. George's, Grenada	Trinidad and Tobago	1–0	2–2	Friendly
