= 2015 Windward Islands Tournament =

Tournament details
- Host country: Saint Lucia
- City: Vieux-Fort
- Dates: 12 May 2015– 16 May 2015
- Teams: 4 (from 1 sub-confederation)
- Venue: 1 (in 1 host city)

Final positions
- Champions: Saint Vincent and the Grenadines (4th title)
- Runners-up: Dominica
- Third place: Grenada
- Fourth place: Saint Lucia

Tournament statistics
- Matches played: 6
- Goals scored: 16 (2.67 per match)
- Top scorer: (Saint Vincent and the Grenadines) Myron Samuel (4 goals)
- Best player: (Saint Vincent and the Grenadines) Emerald George
- Best goalkeeper: (Saint Vincent and the Grenadines) Winslow McDowall
- Fair play award: Dominica
- All statistics correct as of 17 May 2015.

The 2015 Windward Islands Tournament is an association football tournament that took place in St. Lucia. It has been organised by the Windward Islands Football Association (WIFA).

Pos	Team	Pld	W	D	L	GF	GA	GD	Pts
1	St. Vincent and the Grenadines (C)	3	3	0	0	6	3	+3	9
2	Dominica	3	1	1	1	3	3	0	4
3	Grenada	3	1	0	2	5	5	0	3
4	Saint Lucia (H)	3	0	1	2	2	5	−3	1

(C) Champions; (H) Hosts

== Matches ==
12 May 2015
17:00

Grenada	2–3	St. Vincent and the Grenadines
S. Rennie 39', 79'	Stats	George 34'; M. Samuel 76', 84' (pen.)

Philip Marcellin Grounds
Referee: Leo Clarke (St Lucia)
12 May 2015
19:30

Saint Lucia	1–1	Dominica
St. Prix 16'	Stats	Elizee 83'

Philip Marcellin Grounds
Referee: Moeth Gaymes (St Vincent & Grenadines)

14 May 2015
18:00

Grenada	1–2	Dominica
Langaigne 18'	Stats	Wade 20'; Elizee 75'

Philip Marcellin Grounds
Referee: Vivian Robinson (St Lucia)
14 May 2015
20:30

Saint Lucia	1–2	St. Vincent and the Grenadines
Felix 38'	Stats	George 75'; M. Samuel 85'

Philip Marcellin Grounds
Referee: Rhomie Blanc (Dominica)

16 May 2015
18:00

St. Vincent and the Grenadines	1–0	Dominica
M. Samuel 22'	Stats

Philip Marcellin Grounds
Referee: Leo Clarke (St Lucia)
16 May 2015
20:30

Saint Lucia	0–2	Grenada
	Stats	J. Charles 3', 74'

Philip Marcellin Grounds
Referee: Moeth Gaymes (St Vincent & Grenadines)

== Goal scorers ==
There were 16 goals scored in 6 matches, for an average of 2.67 goals per match.

4 goals

- (Saint Vincent and the Grenadines) Myron Samuel

2 goals

- (Dominica) Glensworth Elizee
- (Grenada) Jamal Charles
- (Grenada) Shane Rennie
- (Saint Vincent and the Grenadines) Emerald George

1 goal

- (Dominica) Julian Wade
- (Grenada) Cassim Langaigne
- (Saint Lucia) Romiel Felix
- (Saint Lucia) Malik St Prix
