= Pernal Williams =

Saint Lucian international footballer (born 1991)

Personal information
- Date of birth: 15 August 1991 (age 35)
- Place of birth: Millet Caico, Martinique
- Height: 1.60 m (5 ft 3 in)
- Position: Right back

Team information
- Current team: AS Eclair

Senior career*
| Years | Team | Apps | (Gls) |
| 2010–2013 | W Connection | | |
| 2013–2016 | Aiglon du Lamentin | | |
| 2016 | La Clary | | |
| 2017– | AS Eclair | | |

International career^{‡}
- Saint Lucia U17
| 2010– | Saint Lucia | 26 | (3) |
- * Club domestic league appearances and goals as of 21 August 2014 ‡ National team caps and goals as of 16 October 2018

Pernal Williams (born 15 August 1991) is a Saint Lucian international footballer who plays for Martiniquais club AS Eclair, as a defender.

== Club career ==
Born in Millet Caico, Martinique, Williams has played for W Connection, Aiglon du Lamentin, La Clary and AS Eclair.

== International career ==
He made his international debut for Saint Lucia in 2010, and has appeared in FIFA World Cup qualifying matches. As of August 2014, Williams had played 19 times for Saint Lucia, scoring once in FIFA recognised competition.

=== International goals ===
Scores and results list Saint Lucia's goal tally first.

| No. | Date | Venue | Opponent | Score | Result | Competition |
|---|---|---|---|---|---|---|
| 1. | 21 April 2013 | Victoria Park, Kingstown, Saint Vincent and the Grenadines | Saint Vincent and the Grenadines | 2–0 | 2–0 | 2013 Windward Islands Tournament |
| 2. | 7 September 2018 | Sir Vivian Richards Stadium, North Sound, Antigua and Barbuda | Antigua and Barbuda | 1–0 | 3–0 | 2019–20 CONCACAF Nations League qualification |
| 3. | 16 October 2018 | Stade Pierre Aliker, Fort de France, Martinique | Haiti | 1–2 | 1–2 | 2019–20 CONCACAF Nations League qualification |
