= Mindoo Phillip Park =

Multi purpose stadium in Saint Lucia

Coordinates: 14°00′14.81″N 60°59′04.51″W

- Victoria Park

Ground information
- Location: Castries, St Lucia
- Tenants: Windward Islands cricket team

International information
- First ODI: 12 April 1978: West Indies v Australia
- Last ODI: 19 April 1984: West Indies v Australia
- As of 3 January 2017; Source: Cricinfo

Mindoo Phillip Park is a multipurpose stadium located in Marchand, Castries, Saint Lucia. It is a training and competition venue for cricket, association football, rugby and track and field, among other sports. It was formerly a home venue for the Windward Islands cricket team.

The ground hosted two One Day Internationals, in 1978 and 1984. Both matches involved West Indies and Australia. On 12 April 1978, Australia beat West Indies by two wickets. On 19 April 1984, West Indies returned the favour, winning by seven wickets.

First-class cricket has not been played at Mindoo Phillip Park since 2001 due to the construction of Beausejour Stadium. The venue had previously been known as Victoria Park, but in 1979 was renamed in honour of Francis Mindoo Phillip, widely acclaimed as the island's greatest cricketer.

== International Centuries ==
Single ODI century has been scored at the venue.

No.	Score	Player	Team	Balls	Opposing team	Date	Result
1	102*	Desmond Haynes	West Indies	110	Australia	4 April 1984	Won
