= 2014 Windward Islands Tournament =

Tournament details
- Host country: Dominica
- Dates: 30 April - 4 May 2014
- Teams: 4 (from 1 sub-confederation)
- Venue: 1 (in 1 host city)

Final positions
- Champions: Saint Lucia (1st title)
- Runners-up: Saint Vincent and the Grenadines
- Third place: Grenada
- Fourth place: Dominica

Tournament statistics
- Matches played: 6
- Goals scored: 16 (2.67 per match)
- Top scorer(s): (Dominica) Julian Wade (Grenada) Denron Daniel (Grenada) Jake Rennie (Saint Lucia) Gerlanne Neptune (Saint Vincent and the Grenadines) Oalex Anderson (2 goals)
- Best player: Zaccheus Polius

The 2014 Windward Islands Tournament was an international football tournament between the Windward Islands nations which was hosted by Dominica between 30 April and 4 May 2014. Saint Lucia was crowned champion.

== Fixtures ==
All times are local (UTC-4)

Table

Team	Pld	W	D	L	GF	GA	GD	Pts
Saint Lucia	3	2	1	0	3	0	+3	7
Saint Vincent and the Grenadines	3	1	2	0	3	2	+1	5
Grenada	3	1	1	1	5	4	+1	4
Dominica	3	0	0	3	5	10	−5	0

30 April 2014
17:00

Grenada	0–0	Saint Vincent and the Grenadines
	Report

Windsor Park, Roseau
Referee: Leon Clarke (Saint Lucia)
30 April 2014
19:00

Dominica	0–2	Saint Lucia
	Report	Neptune 5'; Charles 47'

Windsor Park, Roseau
Referee: Moeth Gaymes (Saint Vincent and the Grenadines)

2 May 2014
17:00

Grenada	0–1	Saint Lucia
	Report	Neptune 70'

Windsor Park, Roseau
Referee: Moeth Gaymes (Saint Vincent and the Grenadines)
2 May 2014
19:00

Dominica	2–3	Saint Vincent and the Grenadines
Walsh 24'; Lawrence 35'	Report	Francis 1'; Anderson 15', 29'

Windsor Park, Roseau
Referee: Vivian Robinson (Saint Lucia)

4 May 2014
17:00

Dominica	3–5	Grenada
Wade 4', 51'; Parker 36'	Report	Rennie 15', 71'; Williams 78'; Daniel 87', 88'

Windsor Park, Roseau
Referee: Moeth Gaymes (Saint Vincent and the Grenadines)
4 May 2014
19:15

Saint Lucia	0–0	Saint Vincent and the Grenadines
	Report

Windsor Park, Roseau
Referee: Carlisle Jno Baptiste (Dominica)

== Goal scorers ==
There were 16 goals scored in 6 matches, for an average of 2.67 goals per match.

2 goals

- (Dominica) Julian Wade
- (Grenada) Denron Daniel
- (Grenada) Jake Rennie
- (Saint Lucia) Gerlanne Neptune
- (Saint Vincent and the Grenadines) Oalex Anderson

1 goal

- (Dominica) Chris Lawrence
- (Dominica) Delroy Parker
- (Dominica) Matthew Walsh
- (Grenada) Jake Rennie
- (Grenada) Nicko Williams
- (Saint Lucia) Eden Charles
- (Saint Vincent and the Grenadines) Kevin Francis
