= Victoria Park (Kingstown) =

Coordinates: 13°09′30″N 61°13′46″W

Independence Park
- Interactive map of Independence Park
- Full name: Independence Park
- Location: Kingstown, Saint Vincent and the Grenadines
- Capacity: 3,500

Tenant
- Avenues United FC

Independence Park formally known as Victoria Park is a multi-use stadium in Kingstown, Saint Vincent and the Grenadines . It is used as the stadium of Avenues United FC matches. The capacity of the stadium is 3,500 spectators. It hosted the Group B matches of the 2010 Caribbean Championship.
