= Montserrat national football team results =

The Montserrat national football team is the representative association football team of the small Caribbean island of Montserrat. Football is the second most popular sport in Montserrat after cricket, and official competitive football on the island is governed by the Montserrat Football Association (MFA). The association is affiliated to the Confederation of North, Central American and Caribbean Association Football (CONCACAF) and the team has, as of December 2009, entered seven Caribbean Cup competitions and three FIFA World Cup qualification campaigns. Montserrat played their first international fixture in 1991, which ended in a 0–3 defeat by Saint Lucia. In their second match, they secured a 1–1 draw with Anguilla. Montserrat lost their next seven matches before achieving their first ever victory on 26 March 1995, when they defeated Anguilla 3–2 at the Blakes Estate Stadium in Plymouth. Montserrat also went on to win their next match, again defeating Anguilla 1–0.

In 1995, football on the island was halted due to the activity of the Soufrière Hills volcano. The MFA became a full Fédération Internationale de Football Association (FIFA) member in 1996, but the team did not play another international match for a further three years after this, when they entered the 1999 Caribbean Nations Cup. They were knocked out in the preliminary round of the tournament, losing 1–6 over two legs to the British Virgin Islands. Montserrat entered the FIFA World Cup for the first time in 2002, but were beaten 1–6 on aggregate by the Dominican Republic in the first qualifying round. On 30 June 2002, the day of the World Cup Final, Montserrat played Bhutan in "The Other Final". The friendly match between the two lowest-ranked teams in the world ended with a 4–0 win for Bhutan. Montserrat again entered the World Cup qualifiers for the 2006 competition, but were again defeated in the first qualifying round, this time losing 0–20 on aggregate to Bermuda. In the first leg at the Bermuda National Stadium they lost 0–13, which is their heaviest-ever defeat. They competed in the 2005 Caribbean Cup, but once more failed to progress past the Premilinary Round. They were defeated 1–7 by Suriname in the first qualifying round of the 2010 World Cup.

On 9 September 2012, Montserrat achieved their first victory in 17 years, beating the British Virgin Islands 7–0 in a qualifying match for the 2012 Caribbean Championship. The win, the team's first as a FIFA-affiliated country, came after a run of 21 straight defeats. In total, Montserrat have played 30 international matches. Of these they have lost 26, drawn one and won three, two of those victories coming against Anguilla. The poor results of the team has seen them perennially languishing at the lower end of the FIFA World Rankings. The loss to Bhutan in "The Other Final" saw them fall to #205 in the rankings, becoming the worst-ranked side in the world. In July 2006, they achieved a record high rank of #196.

== Key ==
Key to matches

- Att. = Match attendance
- (H) = Home ground
- (A) = Away ground
- (N) = Neutral venue
- — = Match attendance not known

Key to record by opponent

- P = Games played
- W = Games won
- D = Games drawn
- L = Games lost
- GF = Goals for
- GA = Goals against

== Results ==
=== Pre-FIFA affiliation (1991–1996) ===
Montserrat national football team results pre-FIFA affiliation
Date	Venue	Opponents	Score^{[A]}	Competition	Att.	Montserrat scorers
10 May 1991	Vieux Fort National Stadium, Vieux Fort (A)	Saint Lucia	0–3	1991 Caribbean Cup Group Stage	—	
14 May 1991	Vieux Fort National Stadium, Vieux Fort (N)	Anguilla	1–1	1991 Caribbean Cup Group Stage	—	Unknown
15 April 1992	Warner Park, Basseterre (N)	Antigua and Barbuda	0–5	1992 Caribbean Cup Group Stage	—	
17 April 1992	Warner Park, Basseterre (A)	Saint Kitts and Nevis	0–10	1992 Caribbean Cup Group Stage	—	
23 February 1994	Warner Park, Basseterre (A)	Saint Kitts and Nevis	1–9	1994 Caribbean Cup Group Stage	—	Unknown
25 February 1994	Warner Park, Basseterre (N)	Antigua and Barbuda	0–8	1994 Caribbean Cup Group Stage	—	
26 March 1995	Sturge Park, Plymouth (H)	Anguilla	3–2	1995 Caribbean Cup First qualifying round	—	Edwards, Wade, Morris
2 April 1995	Webster Park, The Valley (A)	Anguilla	1–0	1995 Caribbean Cup; First qualifying round	—	Webb
1 May 1995	Arnos Vale Stadium, Kingstown (A)	Saint Vincent and the Grenadines	0–9	1995 Caribbean Cup Second qualifying round	—	
7 May 1995	Sturge Park, Plymouth (H)	Saint Vincent and the Grenadines	0–11	1995 Caribbean Cup Second qualifying round	—	

=== As a FIFA member (1996–present) ===
Montserrat national football team results as a FIFA member
Date	Venue	Opponents	Score^{[A]}	Competition	Att.	Montserrat scorers
5 February 1999	Sherly Ground, Road Town (A)	British Virgin Islands	1–3	1999 Caribbean Nations Cup Preliminary Round	—	Webb
7 February 1999	Sherly Ground, Road Town (A)	British Virgin Islands	0–3	1999 Caribbean Nations Cup Preliminary Round	—	
5 March 2000	Estadio San Cristóbal, San Cristóbal (A)	Dominican Republic	0–3	2002 FIFA World Cup First qualifying round	2,000	
19 March 2000	Hasely Crawford Stadium, Port of Spain (N)	Dominican Republic	1–3	2002 FIFA World Cup First qualifying round	50	Dyer
6 February 2001	Stade Alberic Richards, Marigot (A)	Saint Martin	1–3	2001 Caribbean Nations Cup Preliminary Round	—	
8 February 2001	Stade Alberic Richards, Marigot (N)	Anguilla	1–4	2001 Caribbean Nations Cup Preliminary Round	—	Morris
30 June 2002	Changlimithang Stadium, Thimphu (A)	Bhutan	0–4	The Other Final	15,000	
29 February 2004	Bermuda National Stadium, Devonshire Parish (A)	Bermuda	0–13	2006 FIFA World Cup First qualifying round	3,000	
21 March 2004	Blakes Estate Stadium, Plymouth (H)	Bermuda	0–7	2006 FIFA World Cup First qualifying round	250	
31 October 2004	Warner Park, Basseterre (A)	Saint Kitts and Nevis	1–6	2005 Caribbean Cup Preliminary Round	—	Adams
2 November 2004	Warner Park, Basseterre (N)	Antigua and Barbuda	4–5	2005 Caribbean Cup Preliminary Round	—	Bramble, Fox, Mendes, Farrell
26 March 2008	Marvin Lee Stadium, Macoya (N)^{[B]}	Suriname	1–7	2010 FIFA World Cup First qualifying round	100	Farrell
6 October 2010	Victoria Park, Kingstown (A)	Saint Vincent and the Grenadines	0–7	2010 Caribbean Championship Preliminary Round	5,000	
8 October 2010	Victoria Park, Kingstown (N)	Barbados	0–5	2010 Caribbean Championship Preliminary Round	350	
10 October 2010	Victoria Park, Kingstown (N)	Saint Kitts and Nevis	0–4	2010 Caribbean Championship Preliminary Round	1,100	
15 June 2011	Ato Boldon Stadium, Couva (N)^{[C]}	Belize	2–5	2014 FIFA World Cup qualification First qualifying round	100	Hodgson (2)
17 July 2011	Estadio Olímpico, San Pedro Sula (N)^{[D]}	Belize	1–3	2014 FIFA World Cup qualification First qualifying round	150	Hodgson
5 September 2012	Stade Omnisports, Lamentin (N)	Suriname	1–7	2012 Caribbean Championship qualification	188	Allen
7 September 2012	Stade En Camée, Rivière-Pilote (A)	Martinique	0–5	2012 Caribbean Championship qualification	400	
9 September 2012	Stade d'Honneur de Dillon, Fort-de-France (N)	British Virgin Islands	7–0	2012 Caribbean Championship qualification	120	Campbell (2), Roach, Woods-Garness, Remy (2), Sargeant (o.g.)
30 May 2014	Blakes Estate Stadium (H)	U.S. Virgin Islands	1–0	2014 Caribbean Cup qualification	—	Hodgson
3 June 2014	Blakes Estate Stadium (H)	Bonaire	0–0	2014 Caribbean Cup qualification	—	
27 March 2015	Ergilio Hato Stadium, Willemstad (A)	Curaçao	1–2	2018 FIFA World Cup qualification	—	L. Taylor
31 March 2015	Blakes Estate Stadium, St. John's (H)	Curaçao	2–2	2018 FIFA World Cup qualification	—	Willer, Woods-Garness
8 September 2018	Blakes Estate Stadium, St. John's (H)	El Salvador	1–2	2019–20 CONCACAF Nations League qualifying	—	J. Taylor
14 October 2018	Blakes Estate Stadium, St. John's (H)	Belize	1–0	2019–20 CONCACAF Nations League qualifying	—	Weir-Daley
16 November 2018	Ergilio Hato Stadium, Willemstad (A)	Aruba	2–0	2019–20 CONCACAF Nations League qualifying	—	Weir-Daley, Woods-Garness
22 March 2019	Ed Bush Stadium, West Bay (A)	Cayman Islands	2–1	2019–20 CONCACAF Nations League qualifying	—	Clifton, Woods-Garness
7 September 2019	Blakes Estate Stadium, Lookout (H)	Dominican Republic	2–1	2019–20 CONCACAF Nations League B	—	J. Comley, Clifton
10 September 2019	Blakes Estate Stadium, Lookout (H)	Saint Lucia	1–1	2019–20 CONCACAF Nations League B	—	Weir-Daley
12 October 2019	Blakes Estate Stadium, Lookout (H)	El Salvador	0–2	2019–20 CONCACAF Nations League B	—	
15 October 2019	Estadio Olímpico Félix Sánchez, Santo Domingo (A)	Dominican Republic	0–0	2019–20 CONCACAF Nations League B	—	
16 November 2019	Estadio Cuscatlán, San Salvador (A)	El Salvador	0–1	2019–20 CONCACAF Nations League B	—	
19 November 2019	Darren Sammy Cricket Ground, Gros Islet (A)	Saint Lucia	1–0	2019–20 CONCACAF Nations League B	—	Pond
24 March 2021	Ergilio Hato Stadium, Willemstad (N)	Antigua and Barbuda	2–2	2022 FIFA World Cup qualification	—	L. Taylor (2)
28 March 2021	Ergilio Hato Stadium, Willemstad (N)	El Salvador	1–1	2022 FIFA World Cup qualification	—	L. Taylor
2 June 2021	Estadio Panamericano, San Cristóbal (N)	U.S. Virgin Islands	4–0	2022 FIFA World Cup qualification	—	Pond, Ince, Clifton (2)
8 June 2021	Kirani James Athletic Stadium, St. George's (A)	Grenada	2–1	2022 FIFA World Cup qualification	—	L. Taylor (2)
2 July 2021	DRV PNK Stadium, Fort Lauderdale (N)	Trinidad and Tobago	1–6	2021 CONCACAF Gold Cup qualification	—	L. Taylor
4 June 2022	Félix Sánchez Olympic Stadium, Santo Domingo (N)	Guyana	1–2	2022–23 CONCACAF Nations League	—	Clifton
7 June 2022	Félix Sánchez Olympic Stadium, Santo Domingo (N)	Haiti	2–3	2022–23 CONCACAF Nations League	—	Simon, L. Taylor
11 June 2022	Félix Sánchez Olympic Stadium, Santo Domingo (N)	Bermuda	3–2	2022–23 CONCACAF Nations League	—	L. Taylor (2), Clifton
14 June 2022	Bermuda National Stadium, Devonshire Parish (A)	Bermuda	Cancelled	2022–23 CONCACAF Nations League	—	
25 March 2023	Blakes Estate Stadium, Lookout (H)	Haiti	0–4	2022–23 CONCACAF Nations League B	650	
28 March 2023	Wildey Turf, Wildey (N)	Guyana	0–0	2022–23 CONCACAF Nations League B	—	
8 September 2023	Wildey Turf, Wildey (A)	Barbados	3–2	2023–24 CONCACAF Nations League B	—	L. Taylor (2), Codrington (o.g.)
11 September 2023	Félix Sánchez Olympic Stadium, Santo Domingo (A)	Dominican Republic	0–3	2023–24 CONCACAF Nations League B	—	
13 October 2023	Wildey Turf, Wildey (N)	Nicaragua	0–3	2023–24 CONCACAF Nations League B	60	
16 October 2023	Nicaragua National Football Stadium, Managua (A)	Nicaragua	0–3	2023–24 CONCACAF Nations League B	12,457	
17 November 2023	Blakes Estate Stadium, Lookout (H)	Dominican Republic	2–1	2023–24 CONCACAF Nations League B	290	Barzey, Simon
20 November 2023	Blakes Estate Stadium, Lookout (H)	Barbados	4–2	2023–24 CONCACAF Nations League B	—	Barzey, Dyer, Daniels, Richmond
5 June 2024	Nicaragua National Football Stadium, Managua (A)	Nicaragua	1–4	2026 FIFA World Cup qualification	14,320	Barzey
9 June 2024	Nicaragua National Football Stadium, Managua (H)	Panama	1–3	2026 FIFA World Cup qualification	155	Simon
5 September 2024	Stadion Antonio Trenidat, Rincon (N)	El Salvador	1–4	2024–25 CONCACAF Nations League B	—	Barzey
8 September 2024	Stadion Antonio Trenidat, Rincon (N)	Saint Vincent and the Grenadines	0–2	2024–25 CONCACAF Nations League B	—	
10 October 2024	Arnos Vale Stadium, Kingstown (N)	Bonaire	1–0	2024–25 CONCACAF Nations League B	—	L. Taylor
13 October 2024	Arnos Vale Stadium, Kingstown (N)	Bonaire	0–1	2024–25 CONCACAF Nations League B	213	
14 November 2024	Estadio Cuscatlán, San Salvador (N)	Saint Vincent and the Grenadines	1–2	2024–25 CONCACAF Nations League B	—	Daniels
17 November 2024	Estadio Cuscatlán, San Salvador (A)	El Salvador	0–1	2024–25 CONCACAF Nations League B	—	
4 June 2025	Ato Boldon Stadium, Couva (N)	Belize	1–0	2026 FIFA World Cup qualification	—	Rogers
10 June 2025	Synthetic Track and Field Facility, Leonora (A)	Guyana	0–3	2026 FIFA World Cup qualification	530	

== Record by opponent ==
As of 1 October 2026

Against	Played	Won	Drawn	Lost	GF	GA	GD	% Won
Anguilla	4	2	1	1	6	7	−1	50%
Antigua and Barbuda	4	0	1	3	6	20	−14	0%
Aruba	1	1	0	0	2	0	+2	100%
Barbados	4	3	0	1	11	11	0	75%
Belize	4	2	0	2	5	8	−3	50%
Bermuda	3	1	0	2	3	22	−19	33.33%
Bhutan	1	0	0	1	0	4	−4	0%
Bonaire	5	2	1	2	2	2	0	40%
British Virgin Islands	5	3	0	2	13	6	+7	60.00%
Cayman Islands	1	1	0	0	2	1	1	100%
Curaçao	2	0	1	1	3	4	−1	0%
Dominican Republic	7	3	1	3	7	12	−5	42.85%
El Salvador	7	0	1	6	4	15	−11	0%
Grenada	1	1	0	0	2	1	+1	100%
Guyana	3	0	1	2	1	5	−4	0%
Haiti	2	0	0	2	2	7	−5	0%
Martinique	1	0	0	1	0	5	−5	0%
Nicaragua	5	0	0	5	2	17	−15	0%
Panama	2	0	0	2	2	6	−4	0%
Saint Kitts and Nevis	4	0	0	4	2	29	−27	0%
Saint Lucia	3	1	1	1	2	4	−2	33%
Trinidad and Tobago	1	0	0	1	1	6	−5	0%
Saint Vincent and the Grenadines	6	0	0	6	1	33	−31	0%
Suriname	2	0	0	2	2	14	−12	0%
Turks and Caicos Islands	1	1	0	0	2	0	+2	100.00%
U.S. Virgin Islands	2	2	0	0	5	0	+5	100%
Total	81	23	8	50	90	238	−148	28.39%

Note: teams in italic indicates that teams are not FIFA members.

== Footnotes ==
A. ^{a} ^{b} In the "Score" column, Montserrat's score is shown first.
B. The match was played in Trinidad and Tobago as neither Montserrat nor Suriname could provide a venue to meet FIFA standards.
C. The match had been intended as a home fixture for Montserrat, but was played in Trinidad and Tobago instead as Montserrat had no facilities on the island to meet international standards.
D. Played on a neutral venue in San Pedro Sula, Honduras.

E. The first leg was originally scheduled to be played on 26 March, and the second leg was originally scheduled to be played on 31 March 2020.
