= Anfernee =

Anfernee is a modern given name. A phonetic variant of Anthony, it was popularized by Anfernee "Penny" Hardaway. It was among the top 2000 most popular baby names in the United States from 1993 to 1999. Notable people with the given name include:

== Given name ==
- Anfernee Dijksteel (born 1996), Dutch footballer
- Anfernee Frederick (born 1996), Dominican footballer
- Anfernee Grier (born 1995), American baseball player
- Anfernee Jennings (born 1997), American gridiron football player
- Anfernee "Penny" Hardaway (born 1971), American basketball player and coach
- Anfernee Orji (born 2000), American football player
- Anfernee Seymour (born 1995), Bahamian baseball player
- Anfernee Simons (born 1999), American basketball player

== Middle name ==
- Raheem Nathaniel Anfernee Edwards, full name of Raheem Edwards (born 1995), Canadian soccer player
- Dennis Anfernee Santana Sánchez, full name of Dennis Santana (born 1996), Dominican baseball player

== See also ==
- Anthony, a name pronounced somewhat similarly
