= Jairo Bueno =

Dominican Republic footballer (b. 1998)

Personal information
- Full name: Jairo Bueno Espinal
- Date of birth: 10 September 1998 (age 28)
- Place of birth: Castellón de la Plana, Spain
- Position: Defender

Team information
- Current team: Sariñena

Youth career
- Roda
- Villarreal

Senior career*
Years	Team	Apps	(Gls)
2017–2018	Villarreal C	18	(0)
2018–2020	Roda	38	(2)
2020–2021	Sariñena	4	(0)
2021	San Cristóbal	0	(0)
2021–2022	East Central	3	(1)
2022	Llosetense	2	(0)
2023-	Cibao	0	(0)

International career^{‡}
2019	Dominican Republic U23	3	(0)
2019–	Dominican Republic	8	(1)
- * Club domestic league appearances and goals as of 12 April 2023 ‡ National team caps and goals as of 19 November 2019

Jairo Bueno Espinal (born 10 September 1998) is a professional footballer who plays as a defender for Liga Dominicana club Cibao. Born in Spain, he represents the Dominican Republic at international level.

== International career ==
Bueno made his professional debut for the Dominican Republic national football team in a 1-0 friendly over win Guadeloupe on 15 February 2019. In June 2019 played his debut for the U 23 of Dominican Republic and played in all 3 games, for the Under 23 side.

=== International goals ===
Scores and results list the Dominican Republic's goal tally first.

No.	Date	Venue	Opponent	Score	Result	Competition
1.	10 September 2019	Estadio Cibao FC, Santiago de los Caballeros, Dominican Republic	El Salvador	1–0	1–0	2019–20 CONCACAF Nations League B
