= Rudolf González =

Dominican Republic footballer (b. 1998)

Personal information
- Full name: Rudolf Karl González Vass
- Date of birth: 2 July 1998 (age 28)
- Place of birth: Räckelwitz, Germany
- Height: 1.72 m (5 ft 8 in)
- Position: Winger

Team information
- Current team: Bonner SC
- Number: 7

Youth career
- –2011: Hennef 05
- 2011–2017: Bayer Leverkusen
- 2017: St. Pauli

Senior career*
Years	Team	Apps	(Gls)
2017–2018	St. Pauli II	11	(1)
2018–2019	TuS Koblenz	28	(1)
2019–2020	US Mondorf-les-Bains	8	(0)
2020–2021	ZFC Meuselwitz	6	(1)
2021–2025	Bonner SC	114	(12)
2025-	Eintracht Hohkeppel	4	(0)

International career^{‡}
2014	Germany U16	3	(0)
2014	Germany U17	1	(0)
2019	Dominican Republic U23	1	(1)
2019–	Dominican Republic	7	(1)
- * Club domestic league appearances and goals as of 19:01, 8 December 2025 (UTC) ‡ National team caps and goals as of 5 June 2021

Rudolf Karl González Vass (born 2 July 1998) is a professional footballer who plays as a winger for Bonner SC. Born in Germany, he represents the Dominican Republic at international level.

== International career ==
González was born in Germany to a Dominican father and a German mother. He is a youth international for Germany. He made his professional debut for the Dominican Republic national football team in a 1–0 friendly over win Guadeloupe on 15 February 2019.

== Career statistics ==
=== Club ===
As of match played 8 December 2025

Appearances and goals by club, season and competition
Club	Season	League		
Club	Season	Division	Apps	Goals
FC St. Pauli II	2016–17	Regionalliga Nord	1	0
FC St. Pauli II	2017–18	Regionalliga Nord	10	1
FC St. Pauli II	Total		11	1
TuS Koblenz	2018–19	Oberliga Rheinland-Pfalz/Saar	28	1
US Mondorf-les-Bains	2019–20	Luxembourg National Division	8	0
ZFC Meuselwitz	2020–21	Regionalliga Nordost	6	1
Bonner SC	2020–21	Regionalliga West	16	1
Bonner SC	2021–22	Regionalliga West	34	3
Bonner SC	2022–23	Oberliga Mittelrhein	27	4
Bonner SC	2023–24	Oberliga Mittelrhein	25	2
Bonner SC	2024–25	Oberliga Mittelrhein	12	2
Bonner SC	Total		114	12
Eintracht Hohkeppel	2025-2026	Mittelrheinliga	4	0
Career Total			171	15

=== International ===
Scores and results list the Dominican Republic's goal tally first, score column indicates score after each González goal.

List of international goals scored by Rudolf González
No.	Date	Venue	Opponent	Score	Result	Competition
1	12 October 2019	Estadio Olímpico Félix Sánchez, Santo Domingo, Dominican Republic	Saint Lucia	3–0	3–0	2019–20 CONCACAF Nations League B
