= Rigoberto Fuentes =

Nicaraguan footballer

Personal information
- Full name: Rigoberto Fuentes
- Date of birth: 11 February 1990 (age 36)
- Place of birth: Managua, Nicaragua
- Height: 1.79 m (5 ft 10 in)
- Position: Defender

International career
Years	Team	Apps	(Gls)
2018–	Nicaragua	4	(1)

Rigoberto Fuentes (born on 11 February 1990), is a Nicaraguan professional football player who plays for the Nicaragua national team.

He debuted internationally on 25 March 2018 in a friendly match in a 3–3 draw against Cuba.

On 18 November 2019, Fuentes scored his first goal for Nicaragua in a 1–2 defeat against Suriname in the CONCACAF Nations League.

== International goals ==
Scores and results list Nicaragua's goal tally first.

No.	Date	Venue	Opponent	Score	Result	Competition
1.	18 November 2019	Nicaragua National Football Stadium, Managua, Nicaragua	Suriname	1–2	1–2	2019–20 CONCACAF Nations League B
