= Noah Harms =

Aruban-Dutch football player (born 1997)

Personal information
- Full name: Noah Lucho Harms
- Date of birth: 5 May 1997 (age 29)
- Place of birth: Hoogvliet, Netherlands
- Height: 1.80 m (5 ft 11 in)
- Position: Defender

Team information
- Current team: Rijnmond Hoogvliet Sport

Youth career
- 2013-2014: Spijkenisse
- 2014-2015: ADO Den Haag
- 2015-2017: Jong Roda JC

Senior career*
Years	Team	Apps	(Gls)
2019	ASWH		
2019-2020	BVCB		
2020-2021	Spijkenisse		
2021-2022	Nieuwenhoorn		
2022-2024	Zwaluwen Vlaardingen		
2024-	Rijnmond Hoogvliet Sport		

International career
2019-2021	Aruba	9	(1)
2022	Aruba XI	1	(0)
- * Club domestic league appearances and goals

Noah Lucho Harms (born 5 May 1997) is an Aruban-Dutch amateur football player who has played on the Aruba national team.

== Club career ==
Harms played on the youth of Spijkenisse, ADO Den Haag, and Roda JC.

After a break, Harms played on the first squads of ASWH (2019), BVCB (2019–2020), and returned to Spijkenisse (2020–2021). Next, he played at VV Nieuwenhoorn (2021–2022). In the 2022–23 season, he played for VV Zwaluwen and he joined hometown club Rijnmond Hoogvliet Sport in summer 2024.

== International career ==
Harms made his international debut for Aruba against St. Lucia on 22 March 2019 in a 3–2 defeat against in the CONCACAF Nations League qualifying rounds, securing their spot to League B.

On 18 November 2019, Harms scored his first goal for Aruba and his first own goal against Antigua and Barbuda in a 2–3 defeat in the CONCACAF Nations League.

=== International goals ===
Scores and results Aruba's goal tally first.

No.	Date	Venue	Opponent	Score	Result	Competition
1.	18 November 2019	Ergilio Hato Stadium, Willemstad, Curaçao	Antigua and Barbuda	2–1	2–3	2019–20 CONCACAF Nations League B
