= Alex Éric =

French Guianaan footballer (born 1990)

Personal information
- Full name: Alex Éric
- Date of birth: 21 September 1990 (age 36)
- Place of birth: Matoury, French Guiana
- Position: Forward

Team information
- Current team: Matoury

Youth career
- Matoury

Senior career*
| Years | Team | Apps | (Gls) |
| 2009– | Matoury | | |

International career^{‡}
| 2016– | French Guiana | 6 | (1) |
- * Club domestic league appearances and goals as of 8 September 2018 ‡ National team caps and goals as of 8 September 2018

Alex Éric (born 21 September 1990) is a French Guianaan footballer who currently plays for Matoury in the French Guiana Honor Division and the French Guiana national team.

== International career ==
Éric made his national team debut for French Guiana on 25 February 2016 in a 2–3 loss against Suriname.

Lauristin scored his first goal and first competitive goal on 7 September 2018, scoring a penalty kick in a 5–0 win against Anguilla, as part of 2019–20 CONCACAF Nations League qualifying.

=== International goals ===
Scores and results list French Guiana's goal tally first.

| No. | Date | Venue | Opponent | Score | Result | Competition |
|---|---|---|---|---|---|---|
| 1. | 7 September 2018 | Raymond E. Guishard Technical Centre, The Valley, Anguilla | Anguilla | 3–0 | 5–0 | 2019–20 CONCACAF Nations League qualification |
| 2. | 8 September 2019 | Warner Park, Basseterre, Saint Kitts and Nevis | Saint Kitts and Nevis | 2–1 | 2–2 | 2019–20 CONCACAF Nations League B |
