= Ulises Rayo =

Nicaraguan footballer

Personal information
- Full name: Ulises Antonio Rayo López
- Date of birth: 12 January 1994 (age 32)
- Place of birth: Estelí, Nicaragua
- Height: 1.75 m (5 ft 9 in)
- Position: Forward

International career
Years	Team	Apps	(Gls)
2019–	Nicaragua	4	(1)

Ulises Antonio Rayo López (born January 12, 1994) is a Nicaraguan footballer who plays as a forward for Real Madriz and the Nicaragua national team.

He debuted internationally on 11 October 2019 in the CONCACAF Nations League and scored his first goal for Nicaragua in a 3-1 victory against Dominica.

== International goals ==
Scores and results list Nicaragua's goal tally first.

No.	Date	Venue	Opponent	Score	Result	Competition
1.	11 October 2019	Nicaragua National Football Stadium, Managua, Nicaragua	Dominica	3–0	3–1	2019–20 CONCACAF Nations League B
