= Pierre Slidja =

French footballer (born 1996)

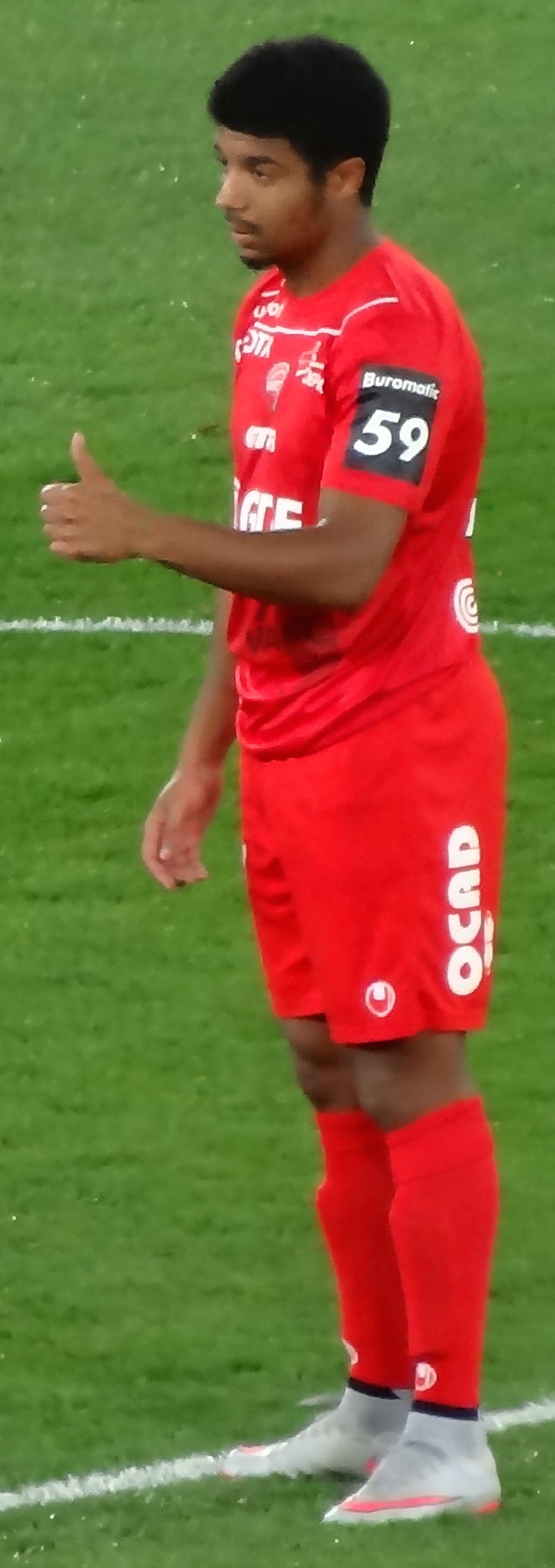

Personal information
- Date of birth: 18 February 1996 (age 30)
- Place of birth: Amiens, France
- Height: 1.70 m (5 ft 7 in)
- Position: Forward

Team information
- Current team: AC Amiens

Youth career
- 2005–2007: Porto Portugais Amiens
- 2007–2013: Amiens

Senior career*
Years	Team	Apps	(Gls)
2013–2014	Amiens	2	(0)
2014–2016	Valenciennes	40	(8)
2016	Chamois Niortais	0	(0)
2017	Belfort	5	(1)
2017–2018	ES Wasquehal	5	(1)
2018–	AC Amiens	35	(10)

International career
2011	France U16	2	(0)
2015–	France U20	3	(0)
- * Club domestic league appearances and goals as of 23:55, 12 January 2020 (UTC)

Pierre Slidja (born 18 February 1996) is a French footballer who currently plays for AC Amiens as a forward. He has previously represented Valenciennes, Amiens and Chamois Niortais. Slidja is of Algerian descent.
