= Jean-Eudes Lauristin =

French Guianaan footballer (born 1994)

Personal information
- Full name: Jean-Eudes Lauristin
- Date of birth: 10 March 1994 (age 32)
- Place of birth: French Guiana
- Position: Midfielder

Team information
- Current team: Étoile Matoury

Senior career*
Years	Team	Apps	(Gls)
- Étoile Matoury

International career^{‡}
2018–	French Guiana	3	(1)
- * Club domestic league appearances and goals as of 8 September 2018 ‡ National team caps and goals as of 8 September 2018

Jean-Eudes Lauristin (born 10 March 1994) is a French Guianan footballer who currently plays for Étoile Matoury in the French Guiana Honor Division and the French Guiana national team.

== International career ==
Lauristin made his national team debut for French Guiana on 6 June 2018 in a 0–3 loss against Martinque.

Lauristin scored his first goal and first competitive goal on 7 September 2018, scoring the opening goal in a 5–0 win against Anguilla, as part of 2019–20 CONCACAF Nations League qualifying.

=== International goals ===
Scores and results list French Guiana's goal tally first.

#	Date	Venue	Opponent	Score	Result	Competition
1.	7 September 2018	Raymond E. Guishard Technical Centre, The Valley, Anguilla	Anguilla	1–0	5–0	2019–20 CONCACAF Nations League qualification
