= Yordan Santa Cruz =

Cuban footballer

Personal information
- Full name: Yordan Eduardo Santa Cruz Vera
- Date of birth: 7 October 1993 (age 33)
- Place of birth: Cuba
- Position: Forward

Senior career*
Years	Team	Apps	(Gls)
2009–2018	FC Cienfuegos		
2018	FC Santiago de Cuba		
2019	FC Cienfuegos		
2019	Jarabacoa FC		
2020	Scarborough SC		

International career^{‡}
2014	Cuba U-21	?	(0)
2015–	Cuba	10	(4)
- * Club domestic league appearances and goals ‡ National team caps and goals as of 8 September 2018

Yordan Eduardo Santa Cruz Vera (born 7 October 1993) is a Cuban professional football player who plays for the Cuba national team.

He debuted internationally in March 2015 against the Dominican Republic with a 3-0 victory. In September 2018, he scored twice against Turks and Caicos Islands in an 11-0 victory, resulting in a huge win for Cuba.

== Club career ==
Santa Cruz played in the Campeonato Nacional de Fútbol de Cuba in 2009 with FC Cienfuegos. In 2018, he played for a season with FC Santiago de Cuba before returning to Cienfuegos the following year. In 2019, he was named the province's best footballer of the year. In 2019, he played abroad in the Liga Dominicana de Fútbol with Jarabacoa FC.

In 2020, he played in the Canadian Soccer League with Scarborough SC. In his debut season with Scarborough he assisted in securing the First Division title.

== International career ==
=== International goals ===
Cuba score listed first, score column indicates score after each Santa Cruz goal.

International goals by date, venue, cap, opponent, score, result and competition
No.	Date	Venue	Cap	Opponent	Score	Result	Competition
1.	25 March 2015	Estadio Cibao, Santiago de los Caballeros, Dominican Republic	2	Dominican Republic	2–0	3–0	Friendly
2.	22 March 2018	Estadio Nacional de Fútbol, Managua, Nicaragua	4	Nicaragua	1–0	1–3	Friendly
3.	8 September 2018	Estadio Pedro Marrero, Havana, Cuba	10	Turks and Caicos Islands	7–0	11–0	2019–20 CONCACAF Nations League qualification
4.	8 September 2018	Estadio Pedro Marrero, Havana, Cuba	10	Turks and Caicos Islands	8–0	11–0	2019–20 CONCACAF Nations League qualification
5.	29 September 2018	Estadio Pedro Marrero, Havana, Cuba	11	Cayman Islands	2–0	5–0	Friendly
6.	29 September 2018	Estadio Pedro Marrero, Havana, Cuba	11	Cayman Islands	3–0	5–0	Friendly
7.	12 October 2018	Kirani James Athletic Stadium, St. George's, Grenada	12	Grenada	2–0	2–0	2019–20 CONCACAF Nations League qualification
8.	17 November 2018	Estadio Pedro Marrero, Havan, Cuba	13	Dominican Republic	1–0	1–0	2019–20 CONCACAF Nations League qualification

== Rape accusation ==
Santa Cruz Vera was accused of rape by an American woman in an incident that occurred in Jamaica on March 31, 2015. Cuba's national soccer team had just participated in an international friendly match against Jamaica's team in the Montego Bay Sports Complex. According to the lawsuit, the woman identified Santa Cruz Vera as one of three men that raped her in a resort bathroom. In the lawsuit, the woman said the Cuban government intervened on the players’ behalf and compromised the investigation. DNA evidence from the athletes was not provided to Jamaican authorities, according to law enforcement there. To this day, no one has been arrested or charged.
