= Laurent Héloïse =

French footballer (born 1985)

Personal information
- Date of birth: 13 May 1985 (age 41)
- Place of birth: Amiens, France
- Height: 1.83 m (6 ft 0 in)
- Position: Defender

Team information
- Current team: AC Amiens

Youth career
- –2004: Amiens
- 2004–2005: Saint-Just-en-Chausée

Senior career*
Years	Team	Apps	(Gls)
2005–2006	Saint-Quentin		
2006–2008	Guingamp	2	(0)
2008–2010	Dunkerque	59	(3)
2010–2013	Le Poiré-sur-Vie	93	(6)
2013–2014	Boulogne	24	(1)
2014–2016	Amiens	60	(3)
2016–2017	Châteauroux	32	(3)
2017–2020	Chambly	35	(3)
2018–2020	Chambly B	22	(0)
2020–	AC Amiens	5	(0)
- * Club domestic league appearances and goals as of 1 July 2019

Laurent Héloïse (born 13 May 1985) is a French professional footballer who plays as a defender for Championnat National 3 club AC Amiens.
