= Junior Benjamin =

Antiguan association football player

Personal information
- Date of birth: 13 August 1992 (age 34)
- Place of birth: Antigua and Barbuda
- Position: Forward

International career
Years	Team	Apps	(Gls)
2018–	Antigua and Barbuda	3	(1)

Junior Benjamin (born 13 August 1992) is a professional football player from Antigua and Barbuda who plays for the Antigua and Barbuda national team.

He debuted on 1 April 2018 in a friendly match with Dominica in a 0–0 draw.

On 22 March 2019, Benjamin scored his first goal for Antigua and Barbuda in a 2–1 victory against Curaçao, resulting a qualification spot to League B of the CONCACAF Nations League.

== International career ==
=== International goals ===
Scores and results list Antigua and Barbuda's goal tally first.

No.	Date	Venue	Opponent	Score	Result	Competition
1.	23 March 2019	Sir Vivian Richards Stadium, North Sound, Antigua and Barbuda	Curaçao	2–1	2–1	2019–20 CONCACAF Nations League qualification
2.	11 October 2019	Sir Vivian Richards Stadium, St. John's, Antigua and Barbuda	Guyana	1–0	2–1	2019–20 CONCACAF Nations League B
3.	18 November 2019	Ergilio Hato Stadium, Willemstad, Curaçao	Aruba	1–1	3–2	2019–20 CONCACAF Nations League B
