= Victor Samb =

Senegalese footballer

Personal information
- Full name: Victor Abdou Samb
- Date of birth: 12 November 1985 (age 41)
- Place of birth: Senegal
- Height: 1.68 m (5 ft 6 in)
- Position: Attacking midfielder

Team information
- Current team: AC Amiens

Youth career
- Saarbrücken

Senior career*
Years	Team	Apps	(Gls)
2007–2008	Toulon	17	(2)
2008–2009	Virton	19	(4)
2009–2010	Senica	13	(2)
2011–2012	Alfortville	23	(8)
2012–2013	AC Amiens	29	(4)
2013–2014	Paris	27	(2)
2014–2017	AC Amiens	86	(18)
2017–2018	FC Mantes	20	(1)
2018–2019	MDA Chasselay	24	(2)
2019–	AC Amiens	7	(1)
- * Club domestic league appearances and goals as of 01:19, 8 November 2019 (UTC)

Victor Abdou Samb (born 12 November 1985) is a Senegalese footballer who currently plays for French club AC Amiens as an attacking midfielder.

In addition to spells in France with Toulon, Alfortville, Paris, AC Amiens and FC Mantes, Samb has also played in Belgium for R.E. Virton and in Slovakia for FK Senica.
