= Yannick Passape =

Guadeloupean footballer (born 1982)

Personal information
- Date of birth: 19 April 1982 (age 44)
- Place of birth: Les Abymes, Guadeloupe
- Height: 1.70 m (5 ft 7 in)
- Position: Forward

Team information
- Current team: Phare Petit-Canal

Senior career*
Years	Team	Apps	(Gls)
2000–2003	Morne-à-l'Eau		
2003–2004	US Granville	26	(11)
2004–2005	Phare Petit-Canal		
2005–2008	US Avranches	66	(13)
2008–2009	Trouville-Deauville	34	(19)
2009–2011	US Quevilly-Rouen	55	(17)
2011–2013	US Granville	47	(24)
2013–2014	Jura Sud Foot	21	(13)
2014–2017	Fleury 91	77	(26)
2017–2018	CS Moulien		
2018–	Phare Petit-Canal		

International career^{‡}
2008–	Guadeloupe	7	(1)
- * Club domestic league appearances and goals as of 12:57, 23 March 2019 (UTC) ‡ National team caps and goals as of 12:57, 23 March 2019 (UTC)

Yannick Passape (born 19 April 1982), is a Guadeloupean professional footballer who plays for the Guadeloupe national football team.

== Career statistics ==
=== Club ===
As of 23 March 2019.

Club	Season	League			Coupe de France		Other		Total	
Club	Season	Division	Apps	Goals	Apps	Goals	Apps	Goals	Apps	Goals
US Granville	2003–04	Division d'Honneur	26	11	0	0	0	0	26	11
US Avranches	2005–06	Championnat de France Amateur 2	2	0	0	0	0	0	2	0
US Avranches	2006–07	Championnat de France Amateur 2	31	5	0	0	0	0	31	5
US Avranches	2007–08	Championnat de France Amateur 2	33	8	0	0	0	0	33	8
US Avranches	Total		66	13	0	0	0	0	66	13
Trouville-Deauville	2008–09	Championnat de France Amateur 2	34	19	0	0	0	0	34	19
US Quevilly-Rouen	2009–10	Championnat de France Amateur	30	10	4	0	0	0	34	10
US Quevilly-Rouen	2010–11	Championnat de France Amateur	25	7	3	3	0	0	28	10
US Quevilly-Rouen	Total		55	17	7	3	0	0	62	20
US Granville	2011–12	Championnat de France Amateur 2	22	17	0	0	0	0	22	17
US Granville	2012–13	Championnat de France Amateur 2	25	9	0	0	0	0	25	9
US Granville	Total		47	24	0	0	0	0	47	24
Jura Sud Foot	2013–14	Championnat de France Amateur	21	13	2	0	0	0	23	13
Fleury 91	2014–15	Championnat de France Amateur	26	11	1	0	0	0	27	11
Fleury 91	2015–16	Championnat de France Amateur	28	11	0	0	0	0	28	11
Fleury 91	2016–17	Championnat de France Amateur	23	4	2	0	0	0	25	4
Fleury 91	Total		77	26	3	0	0	0	80	26
Phare Petit-Canal	2018–19	Guadeloupe Division of Honor	?	?	1	1	0	0	1	1
Career total			326	125	13	4	0	0	339	129

=== International ===
As of matches played 23 March 2019.

National team	Year	Apps	Goals
Martinique	2008	1	0
Martinique	2018	6	1
Total		7	1

=== International goals ===
Scores and results list Guadeloupe's goal tally first.

No	Date	Venue	Opponent	Score	Result	Competition
1.	11 September 2018	Raymond E. Guishard Technical Centre, The Valley, Anguilla	Saint Martin	3–0	3–0	2019–20 CONCACAF Nations League qualification
