= 2019–20 CONCACAF Nations League B =

Tournament details
- Dates: 5 September – 19 November 2019
- Teams: 16
- Promoted: El Salvador; Grenada; Jamaica; Suriname
- Relegated: Aruba; Dominica; Saint Kitts and Nevis; Saint Lucia

Tournament statistics
- Matches played: 48
- Goals scored: 131 (2.73 per match)
- Top scorer(s): (Suriname) Gleofilo Vlijter (10 goals)

The 2019–20 CONCACAF Nations League B was the second division of the 2019–20 edition of the CONCACAF Nations League, the inaugural season of the international football competition involving the men's national teams of the 41 member associations of CONCACAF.

== Format ==
League B consisted of sixteen teams from qualifying which finished from 7th to 22nd. The league was split into four groups of four teams. The teams competed in a home-and-away, round-robin format over the course of the group phase, with matches played in the official FIFA match windows in September, October and November 2019. The four group winners were promoted to League A, while the four last-placed teams in each group were relegated to League C for the next edition of the tournament.

In September 2019, it was announced that the Nations League would also provide qualification for the 2021 CONCACAF Gold Cup. The winners of each of the four League B groups qualified for the Gold Cup, while the second-placed teams entered the first round of Gold Cup qualification.

=== Seeding ===
Teams were seeded into the pots of League B according to their position in the November 2018 CONCACAF Ranking Index.

Pot 1
Team	Pts	Rank
Jamaica	1,507	6
El Salvador	1,380	9
Nicaragua	1,083	14
French Guiana	1,057	16

Pot 2
Team	Pts	Rank
Saint Kitts and Nevis	1,018	18
Dominican Republic	983	19
Suriname	975	20
Guyana	953	21

Pot 3
Team	Pts	Rank
Antigua and Barbuda	930	22
Belize	831	24
Saint Vincent and the Grenadines	821	25
Saint Lucia	813	26

Pot 4
Team	Pts	Rank
Grenada	749	28
Aruba	638	31
Dominica	593	32
Montserrat	478	35

The draw for the group phase took place at The Chelsea in Las Vegas, Nevada, United States on 27 March 2019, 22:00 EDT (19:00 local time, PDT).

== Groups ==
The fixture list was confirmed by CONCACAF on 21 May 2019.

Times are EDT/EST, (Note: EDT (UTC−4) for matches in September and October 2019, and EST (UTC−5) for matches in November 2019.) as listed by CONCACAF (local times, if different, are in parentheses).

=== Group A ===
Pos	Team	Pld	W	D	L	GF	GA	GD	Pts	Promotion, qualification or relegation	(Grenada)	(French Guiana)	(Belize)	(Saint Kitts and Nevis)
1	Grenada (P)	6	4	2	0	8	4	+4	14	League A and Gold Cup	—	1–0	3–2	2–1
2	French Guiana	6	2	2	2	8	6	+2	8	Advance to Gold Cup prelims	0–0	—	3–0	3–1
3	Belize	6	2	0	4	6	12	−6	6		1–2	2–0	—	0–4
4	Saint Kitts and Nevis (R)	6	1	2	3	8	8	0	5	Relegation to League C	0–0	2–2	0–1	—

Source: CONCACAF
Rules for classification: Tiebreakers
(P) Promoted; (R) Relegated
5 September 2019
18:00

Grenada	2–1	Saint Kitts and Nevis
Mitchell 19'; Charles 82'	Report	Hanley 57'

Kirani James Athletic Stadium, St. George's
Referee: Kevin Morrison (Jamaica)
5 September 2019
20:00 (21:00 UTC−3)

French Guiana	3–0 Awarded (Note: CONCACAF awarded French Guiana a 3–0 win as a result of Belize not being able to report to the match due to logistical issues.)	Belize
	Report

Stade Municipal Dr. Edmard Lama, Cayenne

8 September 2019
18:00 (16:00 UTC−6)

Belize	1–2	Grenada
McCaulay 24'	Report	Paterson 59' (pen.); Charles 90+3'

Isidoro Beaton Stadium, Belmopan
Referee: Erick Lezama (Nicaragua)
8 September 2019
19:00

Saint Kitts and Nevis	2–2	French Guiana
Amory 50'; Liburd 75'	Report	Haabo 23'; Éric 53' (pen.)

Warner Park, Basseterre
Referee: Melvin Matamoros (Honduras)

10 October 2019
20:00 (21:00 UTC−3)

French Guiana	0–0	Grenada
	Report

Stade Municipal Dr. Edmard Lama, Cayenne
Referee: Tristley Bassue (Saint Kitts and Nevis)
10 October 2019
22:00 (20:00 UTC−6)

Belize	0–4	Saint Kitts and Nevis
	Report	Sterling-James 12'; Liburd 48' (pen.), 56', 63'

Isidoro Beaton Stadium, Belmopan
Referee: Sergio Reyna (Guatemala)

13 October 2019
18:00

Saint Kitts and Nevis	0–1	Belize
	Report	Smith 3' (pen.)

Warner Park, Basseterre
Referee: Jaime Herrera (El Salvador)
13 October 2019
19:00

Grenada	1–0	French Guiana
Charles 67'	Report

Kirani James Athletic Stadium, St. George's
Referee: Bryan López (Guatemala)

14 November 2019
14:00 (15:00 UTC−4)

Saint Kitts and Nevis	0–0	Grenada
	Report

Warner Park, Basseterre
Referee: Daneon Parchment (Jamaica)
14 November 2019
18:00 (17:00 UTC−6)

Belize	2–0	French Guiana
Lewis 4'; McCaulay 70'	Report

Isidoro Beaton Stadium, Belmopan
Referee: Erick Lezama (Nicaragua)

17 November 2019
17:00 (19:00 UTC−3)

French Guiana	3–1	Saint Kitts and Nevis
Marigard 19', 28'; Sarrucco 76'	Report	Terrell 11'

Stade Municipal Dr. Edmard Lama, Cayenne
Referee: Oscar Macías (Mexico)
17 November 2019
19:00 (20:00 UTC−4)

Grenada	3–2	Belize
Charles 14', 59', 68'	Report	Gaynair 32'; Salazar 55'

Kirani James Athletic Stadium, St. George's
Referee: José Torres (Puerto Rico)

=== Group B ===
Pos	Team	Pld	W	D	L	GF	GA	GD	Pts	Promotion, qualification or relegation	(El Salvador)	(Montserrat)	(Dominican Republic)	(Saint Lucia)
1	El Salvador (P)	6	5	0	1	10	1	+9	15	League A and Gold Cup	—	1–0	2–0	3–0
2	Montserrat	6	2	2	2	4	5	−1	8	Advance to Gold Cup prelims	0–2	—	2–1	1–1
3	Dominican Republic	6	2	1	3	5	5	0	7		1–0	0–0	—	3–0
4	Saint Lucia (R)	6	1	1	4	2	10	−8	4	Relegation to League C	0–2	0–1	1–0	—

Source: CONCACAF
Rules for classification: Tiebreakers
(P) Promoted; (R) Relegated
7 September 2019
15:00

Montserrat	2–1	Dominican Republic
J. Comley 29'; Clifton 65'	Report	J. García 23'

Blakes Estate Stadium, Lookout
Attendance: 20
Referee: Sergio Reyna (Guatemala)
7 September 2019
22:00 (20:00 UTC−6)

El Salvador	3–0	Saint Lucia
Orellana 7'; Cerén 73' (pen.); Bonilla 87'	Report

Estadio Cuscatlán, San Salvador
Attendance: 20,000
Referee: Óscar Moncada (Honduras)

10 September 2019
16:00

Montserrat	1–1	Saint Lucia
Weir-Daley 45'	Report	Frederick 87' (pen.)

Blakes Estate Stadium, Lookout
Attendance: 10
Referee: Nelson Salgado (Honduras)
10 September 2019
18:00

Dominican Republic	1–0	El Salvador
Bueno 7'	Report

Estadio Cibao FC, Santiago de los Caballeros
Attendance: 1,000
Referee: Oshane Nation (Jamaica)

12 October 2019
18:00

Dominican Republic	3–0	Saint Lucia
López 34'; Romero 52'; González 85'	Report

Estadio Olímpico Félix Sánchez, Santo Domingo
Attendance: 5,000
Referee: Nitzar Sandoval (Nicaragua)
12 October 2019
22:00

Montserrat	0–2	El Salvador
	Report	Domínguez 43'; Zelaya 78'

Blakes Estate Stadium, Lookout
Attendance: 50
Referee: Juan Gabriel Calderón (Costa Rica)

15 October 2019
17:00

Saint Lucia	0–2	El Salvador
	Report	Zelaya 68'; Portillo 88'

Darren Sammy Cricket Ground, Gros Islet
Attendance: 100
Referee: Erick Lezama (Nicaragua)
15 October 2019
19:15

Dominican Republic	0–0	Montserrat
	Report

Estadio Olímpico Félix Sánchez, Santo Domingo
Attendance: 3,000
Referee: Raúl Castro Zuniga (Honduras)

16 November 2019
18:00 (19:00 UTC−4)

Saint Lucia	1–0	Dominican Republic
Joseph 38'	Report

Darren Sammy Cricket Ground, Gros Islet
Attendance: 100
Referee: Jaime Herrera (El Salvador)
16 November 2019
22:00 (21:00 UTC−6)

El Salvador	1–0	Montserrat
Portillo 90+1'	Report

Estadio Cuscatlán, San Salvador
Attendance: 10,000
Referee: Oliver Vergara (Panama)

19 November 2019
17:30 (18:30 UTC−4)

Saint Lucia	0–1	Montserrat
	Report	Pond 35'

Darren Sammy Cricket Ground, Gros Islet
Attendance: 100
Referee: Oshane Nation (Jamaica)
19 November 2019
17:30 (16:30 UTC−6)

El Salvador	2–0	Dominican Republic
Portillo 16'; Punyed 87'	Report

Estadio Cuscatlán, San Salvador
Attendance: 7,000
Referee: Benjamín Pineda (Costa Rica)

=== Group C ===
Pos	Team	Pld	W	D	L	GF	GA	GD	Pts	Promotion, qualification or relegation	(Jamaica)	(Guyana)	(Antigua and Barbuda)	(Aruba)
1	Jamaica (P)	6	5	1	0	21	1	+20	16	League A and Gold Cup	—	1–1	6–0	2–0
2	Guyana	6	3	1	2	12	10	+2	10	Advance to Gold Cup prelims	0–4	—	5–1	4–2
3	Antigua and Barbuda	6	3	0	3	8	17	−9	9		0–2	2–1	—	2–1
4	Aruba (R)	6	0	0	6	5	18	−13	0	Relegation to League C	0–6	0–1	2–3	—

Source: CONCACAF
Rules for classification: Tiebreakers
(P) Promoted; (R) Relegated
6 September 2019
19:00

Aruba	0–1	Guyana
	Report	Holder 22'

Ergilio Hato Stadium, Willemstad (Curaçao) (Note: Aruba played their home matches in Curaçao.)
Referee: Jaime Herrera (El Salvador)
6 September 2019
20:00 (19:00 UTC−5)

Jamaica	6–0	Antigua and Barbuda
Nicholson 9', 51'; De Cordova-Reid 31'; Brown 67'; Bailey 77'; Vassell 81'	Report

Montego Bay Sports Complex, Montego Bay
Referee: Oliver Vergara (Panama)

9 September 2019
15:00

Antigua and Barbuda	2–1	Aruba
Bishop 8'; Harriette 69'	Report	Groothusen 45+5'

Sir Vivian Richards Stadium, North Sound
Referee: Rubiel Vazquez (United States)
9 September 2019
19:00

Guyana	0–4	Jamaica
	Report	Powell 14', 26'; Orgill 44', 54'

Synthetic Track and Field Facility, Leonora
Referee: William Anderson (Puerto Rico)

11 October 2019
17:00

Antigua and Barbuda	2–1	Guyana
Griffith 15'; Benjamin 17'	Report	Welshman 50'

Sir Vivian Richards Stadium, North Sound
Referee: Keylor Herrera (Costa Rica)
12 October 2019
18:00 (17:00 UTC−5)

Jamaica	2–0	Aruba
Williams 13'; Nicholson 89'	Report

Independence Park, Kingston
Referee: Jorge Pérez (Mexico)

14 October 2019
20:00

Guyana	5–1	Antigua and Barbuda
Bobb 1', 28'; Holder 65'; Daniel 77'; Schultz 90+3'	Report	Jarvis 48'

Synthetic Track and Field Facility, Leonora
Referee: William Anderson (Puerto Rico)
15 October 2019
19:00

Aruba	0–6	Jamaica
	Report	Willis 7' (pen.); Foster 17', 53'; Walker 19'; Nicholson 34'; Flemmings 47'

Ergilio Hato Stadium, Willemstad (Curaçao)
Referee: Ricardo Montero (Costa Rica)

15 November 2019
19:00 (20:00 UTC−4)

Antigua and Barbuda	0–2	Jamaica
	Report	Willis 34'; Morris 58'

Sir Vivian Richards Stadium, North Sound
Referee: Randy Encarnación (Dominican Republic)
15 November 2019
20:00 (21:00 UTC−4)

Guyana	4–2	Aruba
Briggs 7'; Harriott 44'; Bobb 53', 73'	Report	Croes 2'; Breinburg 22' (pen.)

Synthetic Track and Field Facility, Leonora
Referee: Kevin Morrison (Jamaica)

18 November 2019
18:00 (19:00 UTC−4)

Aruba	2–3	Antigua and Barbuda
John 20'; Harms 76'	Report	Benjamin 36'; Harms 82' (o.g.); Bowry 84'

Ergilio Hato Stadium, Willemstad (Curaçao)
Referee: Jorge Pérez (Mexico)
18 November 2019
20:00

Jamaica	1–1	Guyana
East 50'	Report	Welshman 45'

Montego Bay Sports Complex, Montego Bay
Referee: Keylor Herrera (Costa Rica)

=== Group D ===
Pos	Team	Pld	W	D	L	GF	GA	GD	Pts	Promotion, qualification or relegation	(Suriname)	(Saint Vincent and the Grenadines)	(Nicaragua)	(Dominica)
1	Suriname (P)	6	4	1	1	16	5	+11	13	League A and Gold Cup	—	0–1	6–0	4–0
2	Saint Vincent and the Grenadines	6	3	2	1	6	4	+2	11	Advance to Gold Cup prelims	2–2	—	1–0	1–0
3	Nicaragua	6	2	1	3	9	11	−2	7		1–2	1–1	—	3–1
4	Dominica (R)	6	1	0	5	3	14	−11	3	Relegation to League C	1–2	1–0	0–4	—

Source: CONCACAF
Rules for classification: Tiebreakers
(P) Promoted; (R) Relegated
5 September 2019
15:00

Dominica	1–2	Suriname
Frederick 23'	Report	G. Vlijter 7', 90'

Windsor Park, Roseau
Referee: Jamar Springer (Barbados)
5 September 2019
20:00 (18:00 UTC−6)

Nicaragua	1–1	Saint Vincent and the Grenadines
Yorke 87' (o.g.)	Report	Anderson 45+2'

Nicaragua National Football Stadium, Managua
Referee: Walter López (Guatemala)

8 September 2019
15:00

Saint Vincent and the Grenadines	1–0	Dominica
Cunningham 45+2'	Report

Arnos Vale Stadium, Arnos Vale
Referee: Sherwin Johnson (Guyana)
8 September 2019
18:00 (19:00 UTC−3)

Suriname	6–0	Nicaragua
G. Vlijter 9', 11', 30', 65'; Fer 13'; Comvalius 85'	Report

André Kamperveen Stadion, Paramaribo
Referee: Bryan López (Guatemala)

11 October 2019
15:00

Saint Vincent and the Grenadines	2–2	Suriname
Stewart 58', 90+5' (pen.)	Report	G. Vlijter 26', 53'

Arnos Vale Stadium, Arnos Vale
Referee: Walter López (Guatemala)
11 October 2019
22:00 (20:00 UTC−6)

Nicaragua	3–1	Dominica
Chavarría 7', 41'; Rayo 90+1'	Report	Wade 90+3'

Nicaragua National Football Stadium, Managua
Referee: Nelson Salgado (Honduras)

14 October 2019
15:00

Dominica	0–4	Nicaragua
	Report	Chavarría 42'; Bonilla 71', 84' (pen.); Mendieta 90+2'

Windsor Park, Roseau
Referee: Kimbell Ward (Saint Kitts and Nevis)
14 October 2019
19:00 (20:00 UTC−3)

Suriname	0–1	Saint Vincent and the Grenadines
	Report	Stewart 68'

André Kamperveen Stadion, Paramaribo
Referee: Oliver Vergara (Panama)

15 November 2019
14:00 (15:00 UTC−4)

Saint Vincent and the Grenadines	1–0	Nicaragua
Sutherland 60'	Report

Arnos Vale Stadium, Arnos Vale
Referee: Reon Radix (Grenada)
15 November 2019
19:30 (21:30 UTC−3)

Suriname	4–0	Dominica
Apai 15', 88'; G. Vlijter 60', 74'	Report

André Kamperveen Stadion, Paramaribo
Referee: Sherwin Johnson (Guyana)

18 November 2019
15:00 (16:00 UTC−4)

Dominica	1–0	Saint Vincent and the Grenadines
Laville 71'	Report

Windsor Park, Roseau
Referee: Ricangel de Leça (Aruba)
18 November 2019
22:00 (21:00 UTC−6)

Nicaragua	1–2	Suriname
Fuentes 60'	Report	Comvalius 21'; Hasselbaink 53'

Nicaragua National Football Stadium, Managua
Referee: Patrick Senecharles (Haiti)

== Goalscorers ==
There were 131 goals scored in 48 matches, for an average of 2.73 goals per match.

10 goals

- (Suriname) Gleofilo Vlijter

6 goals

- (Grenada) Jamal Charles

4 goals

- (Guyana) Trayon Bobb
- (Jamaica) Shamar Nicholson
- (Saint Kitts and Nevis) Rowan Liburd

3 goals

- (El Salvador) Juan Carlos Portillo
- (Nicaragua) Carlos Chavarría
- (Saint Vincent and the Grenadines) Cornelius Stewart

2 goals

- (Antigua and Barbuda) Junior Benjamin
- (Belize) Deon McCaulay
- (El Salvador) Rodolfo Zelaya
- (French Guiana) Jessy Marigard
- (Guyana) Sheldon Holder
- (Guyana) Emery Welshman
- (Jamaica) Maalique Foster
- (Jamaica) Dever Orgill
- (Jamaica) Alvas Powell
- (Jamaica) Chavany Willis
- (Nicaragua) Byron Bonilla
- (Suriname) Dimitrie Apai
- (Suriname) Ivenzo Comvalius

1 goal

- (Antigua and Barbuda) D'Andre Bishop
- (Antigua and Barbuda) Daniel Bowry
- (Antigua and Barbuda) Quinton Griffith
- (Antigua and Barbuda) Tevaughn Harriette
- (Antigua and Barbuda) Nathaniel Jarvis
- (Aruba) Gregor Breinburg
- (Aruba) Glenbert Croes
- (Aruba) Terence Groothusen
- (Aruba) Noah Harms
- (Aruba) Joshua John
- (Belize) Ian Gaynair
- (Belize) Ean Lewis
- (Belize) Michael Salazar
- (Belize) Elroy Smith
- (Dominica) Anfernee Frederick
- (Dominica) Audel Laville
- (Dominica) Julian Wade
- (Dominican Republic) Jairo Bueno
- (Dominican Republic) Josh García
- (Dominican Republic) Rudolf González
- (Dominican Republic) Jean Carlos López
- (Dominican Republic) Dorny Romero
- (El Salvador) Nelson Bonilla
- (El Salvador) Darwin Cerén
- (El Salvador) Roberto Domínguez
- (El Salvador) Narciso Orellana
- (El Salvador) Pablo Punyed
- (French Guiana) Alex Éric
- (French Guiana) Miguel Haabo
- (French Guiana) Joël Sarrucco
- (Grenada) Kairo Mitchell
- (Grenada) Arthur Paterson
- (Guyana) Matthew Briggs
- (Guyana) Kadell Daniel
- (Guyana) Callum Harriott
- (Guyana) Pernell Schultz
- (Jamaica) Leon Bailey
- (Jamaica) Brian Brown
- (Jamaica) Bobby De Cordova-Reid
- (Jamaica) Javon East
- (Jamaica) Junior Flemmings
- (Jamaica) Ricardo Morris
- (Jamaica) Peter-Lee Vassell
- (Jamaica) Lamar Walker
- (Jamaica) Devon Williams
- (Montserrat) Adrian Clifton
- (Montserrat) James Comley
- (Montserrat) Nathan Pond
- (Montserrat) Spencer Weir-Daley
- (Nicaragua) Rigoberto Fuentes
- (Nicaragua) Ricardo Mendieta
- (Nicaragua) Ulises Rayo
- (Saint Kitts and Nevis) G'Vaune Amory
- (Saint Kitts and Nevis) Tahir Hanley
- (Saint Kitts and Nevis) Omari Sterling-James
- (Saint Kitts and Nevis) Tyquan Terrell
- (Saint Lucia) Kurt Frederick
- (Saint Lucia) Antonio Joseph
- (Saint Vincent and the Grenadines) Oalex Anderson
- (Saint Vincent and the Grenadines) Chavel Cunningham
- (Saint Vincent and the Grenadines) Jahvin Sutherland
- (Suriname) Donnegy Fer
- (Suriname) Nigel Hasselbaink

1 own goal

- (Aruba) Noah Harms (against Antigua and Barbuda)
- (Saint Vincent and the Grenadines) Jamal Yorke (against Nicaragua)
