= Joffrey Torvic =

French Guianese footballer (born 1990)

Personal information
- Date of birth: 13 November 1990 (age 35)
- Place of birth: Draveil, France
- Height: 1.70 m (5 ft 7 in)
- Position: Forward

Youth career
- 2005–2010: Paris FC

Senior career*
Years	Team	Apps	(Gls)
2010–2011	Paris FC		
2011–2012	Trouville-Deauville		
2012–2014	CSC Cayenne		
2014–2016	Abbeville		
2016–2017	Ailly-sur-Somme		
2017–2018	Roye-Noyon	14	(1)
2018–2019	Beauvais	7	(1)
2019–2020	US Camon		
2020–2021	AC Amiens	5	(0)
2021–2022	ESC Longueau		

International career^{‡}
2012–	French Guiana	6	(3)
- * Club domestic league appearances and goals as of 1 July 20221 ‡ National team caps and goals as of 8 September 2018

Joffrey Torvic (born 13 November 1990) is a French Guianese footballer who plays as a forward.

== International career ==
Torvic made his national team debut for French Guiana on 6 June 2018 in a 3–0 loss against Martinque.

Torvic scored his first goal and first competitive goal on 7 September 2018, scoring the opening goal in a 5–0 win against Anguilla, as part of 2019–20 CONCACAF Nations League qualifying.

== Career statistics ==
Scores and results list French Guiana's goal tally first, score column indicates score after each Torvic goal.

List of international goals scored by Joffrey Torvic
No.	Date	Venue	Opponent	Score	Result	Competition
1	26 September 2012	Parc des Sports de Saint-Ouen-l'Aumône, Paris, France	Saint Pierre and Miquelon	10–1	11–1	2012 Coupe de l'Outre-Mer
2	7 June 2018	Stade Pierre-Aliker, Fort-de-France, Martinique	Guadeloupe	2–0	2–0	2018 Tournoi des 4
3	7 September 2018	Raymond E. Guishard Technical Centre, The Valley, Anguilla	Anguilla	2–0	5–0	2019–20 CONCACAF Nations League qualification
