= AC Amiens =

French football club

- Full name: Athlétic Club Amiens
- Nickname: ACA
- Founded: 1977
- Ground: Stade Jean Bouin; Amiens, Picardie
- Capacity: 1,500 (300 seated)
- Chairman: (France) Djillali Boulefrad (par intérim)
- Manager: (France) Azouz Hamdane
- League: Régional 1 Hauts-de-France
- 2022–23: National 3 Group I, 12th (relegated)
- Website: www.acamiens.com
Home colours	Away colours

Athlétic Club Amiens is a French association football club founded in 1977. They are based in Amiens, Picardie, located in northern France, 120 km (75 mi) north of Paris. As of the 2023–24 season, they play in Régional 1 the sixth tier of the French football league system. They play at the Stade Jean Bouin, which seats 1,200 people.

== Current squad ==
As of 12 January 2020

Note: Flags indicate national team as defined under FIFA eligibility rules; some limited exceptions apply. Players may hold more than one non-FIFA nationality.

No.	Pos.	Nation	Player
—	GK	FRA	Gauthier Banaziak
—	GK	FRA	Théo Thoris
—	GK	FRA	Jules Dechert
—	DF	FRA	Lilian Ngoma
—	DF	FRA	Arnaud Binet
—	DF	FRA	Kévin Martinez
—	DF	FRA	Aymen Ramla
—	DF	FRA	Mirisoidi Siradjidini
—	DF	FRA	Papa Villier
—	MF	FRA	Richie Dilemfu
—	MF	GUF	Joffrey Torvic
—	MF	NCL	Abiezer Jeno
—	MF	FRA	Mounir Boutarfa

No.	Pos.	Nation	Player
—	MF	FRA	Laurent Héloïse
—	MF	FRA	Romane Hamdane
—	MF	FRA	Landry Matondo
—	MF	FRA	Charly Rosso
—	FW	FRA	Mohamed Ramla
—	FW	FRA	Nadir Ettaibi
—	FW	FRA	Mickaël Despois de Folleville
—	FW	FRA	Romain Kwinta
—	FW	FRA	Thomas Motuta
—	FW	FRA	Nassim Boukhelifa
—	FW	FRA	Nordine Khelif
—	FW	FRA	Victor Samb
—	FW	FRA	Pierre Slidja

== Season results ==
Season	Division	Pos.	Pts.	Pld	W	D	L	GF	GD	GA	Coupe de France
1998–1999	PH Picardie (D7)	n.c	n.c	n.c	n.c	n.c	n.c	n.c	n.c	n.c	n.c
1999–2000	DH Picardie (D6)	12	54	26	8	4	14	36	60	−24	n.c
2000–2001	PH Picardie (D7)	n.c	n.c	n.c	n.c	n.c	n.c	n.c	n.c	n.c	n.c
2001–2002	DH Picardie (D6)	4	67	26	11	8	7	54	41	13	8th Round
2002–2003	DH Picardie (D6)	6	64	26	11	5	10	41	37	4	n.c
2003–2004	DH Picardie (D6)	1	91	26	21	2	3	69	17	52	n.c
2004–2005	CFA2 Group H (D5)	15	59	30	7	8	15	26	47	−21	n.c
2005–2006	DH Picardie (D6)	2	76	26	15	5	6	48	20	28	8th Round
2006–2007	CFA2 Group H (D5)	7	74	30	11	11	8	42	36	6	7th Round
2007–2008	CFA2 Group A (D5)	2	81	30	15	6	9	47	39	8	n.c
2008–2009	CFA2 Group A (D5)	4	82	32	14	8	10	53	36	17	7th Round
2009–2010	CFA2 Group A (D5)	12	69	30	10	9	11	39	38	1	4th Round
2010–2011	CFA2 Group A (D5)	1	89	30	17	8	5	39	18	21	7th Round
2011–2012	CFA Group A (D4)	8	84	34	14	8	12	41	40	1	Round of 32
2012–2013	CFA Group A (D4)	9	78	34	13	5	16	38	44	−6	Round of 32
2013–2014	CFA Group A (D4)	8	66	28	11	5	12	29	28	1	8th Round
2014–2015	CFA Group A (D4)	7	69	30	10	8	12	34	26	8	Round of 32
2015–2016	CFA Group A (D4)	6	70	30	12	4	15	35	34	1	Round of 64
2016–2017	CFA Group B (D4)	12	33	30	9	6	15	30	40	-10	5th Round
