= Joey Taylor =

Montserratian footballer (born 1997)

Personal information
- Full name: Joseph Terrence Taylor
- Date of birth: 18 August 1997 (age 29)
- Positions: Left-back; left midfielder

Youth career
- Welling United

Senior career*
Years	Team	Apps	(Gls)
2014–2017	Welling United	10	(0)
2015	→ Leatherhead (loan)	6	(0)
2016	→ Burgess Hill Town (loan)	12	(0)
2016–2017	→ VCD Athletic (loan)	5	(0)
2017	→ East Grinstead Town (loan)	3	(0)
2017–2018	Burgess Hill Town	32	(1)
2018	Whyteleafe	6	(1)
2018–2019	Horsham	15	(1)
2019	Hythe Town	4	(0)
2019	Horsham	3	(0)
2019	Staines Town	13	(3)
2020–2021	Sevenoaks Town	21	(1)
2021–2022	Cray Wanderers	4	(0)
2022–2024	Chatham Town	25	(0)
2024	Whitehawk	18	(3)
2024–2026	Ashford United	29	(0)
Total		206	(10)

International career^{‡}
2018–2024	Montserrat	23	(1)
- * Club domestic league appearances and goals as of 09:12, 27 March 2026 (UTC) ‡ National team caps and goals as of 09:12, 27 March 2026 (UTC)

Joseph Terrence Taylor (born 18 August 1997) is a Montserratian former footballer who played as a left-back or left midfielder. He represented the Montserrat national team.

He has previously played for Welling United, Leatherhead, Burgess Hill Town, VCD Athletic, East Grinstead Town, Whyteleafe, Horsham, Hythe Town, Staines Town, Cray Wanderers, Chatham Town, Whitehawk and Ashford United.

== Club career ==
=== Welling United ===
Having come through the academy of Welling United, becoming their first graduate of their academy to progress to the first team, Taylor made his debut for the club on 25 November 2014, starting in a 1–0 victory away to Braintree Town. He agreed a one-year deal with Welling United in summer 2015. He joined Leatherhead on a one-month loan in September 2015. He was retained at Welling following the expiry of his contract at the end of the season, with Welling having been relegated to the National League South.

In August 2016, Taylor joined Burgess Hill Town on loan. He had spells on loan at VCD Athletic and East Grinstead Town later on that season.

=== Burgess Hill Town and Whyteleafe ===
In summer 2017, he returned to Burgess Hill Town on a permanent deal. Taylor scored once in 39 appearances for Burgess Hill Town. He joined Whyteleafe in April 2018. He scored once in 6 appearances for Whyteleafe.

=== Horsham and Hythe Town ===
Ahead of the 2018–19 season, Taylor signed for Isthmian League South East Division side Horsham. In February 2019, he switched to fellow Isthmian League South East Division side Hythe Town. He returned to Horsham in April 2019. Horsham finished second in the Isthmian League South East Division and qualified for the promotion play-offs. After coming on as a substitute at half-time in extra-time in the play-off final, he provided the assist for the winning goal with a free-kick headed in by Dylan Merchant in the 108th minute, confirming a 2–1 win over Ashford United and promotion to the Isthmian League Premier Division. Across the 2018–19 season, Taylor scored once in 29 appearances for Horsham, whilst he played four times without scoring for Hythe Town.

=== Staines Town and Sevenoaks Town ===
In June 2019, Taylor joined Staines Town of the Isthmian League South Central Division in search of regular first-team football. He scored twice in 23 appearances for Staines Town, prior to joining Sevenoaks Town of the South East Division on 1 January 2020.

=== Cray Wanderers, Chatham Town, Whitehawk and Ashford United ===
On 9 August 2021, Taylor signed for Cray Wanderers. On 19 January 2024, Taylor signed for Whitehawk from Chatham Town. In July 2024, he joined Ashford United.

In March 2026, Taylor announced his retirement from football following persistent injury problems.

== International career ==
Taylor, who is of Montserratian descent through his grandparents, made his international debut for Montserrat on 8 September 2018 and scored his first international goal for Montserrat in a 1–2 loss against El Salvador in a CONCACAF Nations League qualification match.

== Style of play ==
Taylor can play either at left-back or left midfield.

== Personal life ==
Taylor is the younger brother of fellow Montserrat international Lyle, who plays professionally for Chelmsford City.

== Career statistics ==
=== Club ===
As of match played 14 March 2026

Appearances and goals by club, season and competition
Club	Season	League			FA Cup		Other		Total	
Club	Season	Division	Apps	Goals	Apps	Goals	Apps	Goals	Apps	Goals
Welling United	2014–15	Football Conference	1	0	0	0	2 (Note: 1 appearance in FA Trophy, 1 appearance in Kent Senior Cup)	0	3	0
Welling United	2015–16	National League	9	0	1	0	0	0	10	0
Welling United	2016–17	National League South	0	0	0	0	1 (Note: Appearance(s) in London Senior Cup)	0	1	0
Welling United	Total		10	0	1	0	3	0	14	0
Leatherhead (loan)	2015–16	Isthmian League Premier Division	6	0	0	0	0	0	6	0
Burgess Hill Town (loan)	2016–17	Isthmian League Premier Division	12	0	5	0	0	0	17	0
VCD Athletic (loan)	2016–17	Isthmian League Division One North	5	0	0	0	0	0	5	0
East Grinstead Town (loan)	2016–17	Isthmian League Division One South	3	0	0	0	0	0	3	0
Burgess Hill Town	2017–18	Isthmian League Premier Division	32	1	5	0	2 (Note: Appearance(s) in FA Trophy)	0	39	1
Whyteleafe	2017–18	Isthmian League South Division	6	1	0	0	0	0	6	1
Horsham	2018–19	Isthmian League South East Division	15	1	4	0	3 (Note: 2 appearances in FA Trophy, 1 appearance in Sussex Senior Cup)	0	22	1
Hythe Town	2018–19	Isthmian League South East Division	4	0	0	0	0	0	4	0
Horsham	2018–19	Isthmian League South East Division	3	0	0	0	1 (Note: Appearance(s) in Isthmian League promotion play-offs)	0	4	0
Staines Town	2019–20	Isthmian League South Central Division	13	3	2	0	3 (Note: Appearance(s) in Alan Turvey Trophy)	0	18	3
Sevenoaks Town	2019–20	Isthmian League South East Division	13	0	0	0	0	0	13	0
Sevenoaks Town	2020–21	Isthmian League South East Division	8	1	1	0	1	0	10	1
Sevenoaks Town	Total		21	1	1	0	1	0	23	1
Cray Wanderers	2021–22	Isthmian League Premier Division	4	0	1	0	0	0	5	0
Chatham Town	2022–23	Isthmian League South East Division	18	0	4	0	5	0	27	0
Chatham Town	2023–24	Isthmian League Premier Division	7	0	0	0	3 (Note: Two appearances in Alan Turvey Trophy, one appearance in FA Trophy)	0	10	0
Chatham Town	Total		25	0	4	0	8	0	37	0
Whitehawk	2023–24	Isthmian League Premier Division	18	3	0	0	1 (Note: Appearance(s) in Sussex County Cup)	0	19	3
Ashford United	2024–25	Isthmian League South East Division	17	0	6	0	3	0	26	0
Ashford United	2025–26	Isthmian League South East Division	12	0	1	0	1 (Note: Appearance(s) in Alan Turvey Trophy)	0	14	0
Ashford United	Total		29	0	7	0	4	0	40	0
Career total			206	10	30	0	26	0	262	10

=== International ===
As of match played 20 November 2023

Appearances and goals by national team and year
National team	Year	Apps	Goals
Montserrat	2018	3	1
Montserrat	2019	7	0
Montserrat	2021	5	0
Montserrat	2023	7	0
Total		22	1

Scores and results list Montserrat's goal tally first, score column indicates score after each Montserrat goal.

List of international goals scored by Joey Taylor
No.	Date	Venue	Opponent	Score	Result	Competition	Ref.
1	8 September 2018	Blakes Estate Stadium, Look Out, Montserrat	El Salvador	1–0	1–2	2019–20 CONCACAF Nations League qualification	

== Honours ==
Chatham Town

- Isthmian League South East Division: 2022–23
