= Spencer Weir-Daley =

Montserratian footballer (born 1985)

Personal information
- Full name: Spencer James Andrew Weir-Daley
- Date of birth: 5 September 1985 (age 41)
- Place of birth: Leicester, England
- Height: 1.78 m (5 ft 10 in)
- Position: Striker

Team information
- Current team: Grace Dieu

Youth career
- 1996–2003: Nottingham Forest

Senior career*
Years	Team	Apps	(Gls)
2004–2007	Nottingham Forest	11	(2)
2006	→ Macclesfield Town (loan)	7	(2)
2007	→ Lincoln City (loan)	11	(5)
2007	→ Bradford City (loan)	5	(1)
2007–2009	Notts County	40	(3)
2009–2011	Boston United	79	(35)
2011–2012	AFC Telford United	2	(0)
2011	→ Buxton (dual registration)	3	(4)
2012–2014	Boston United	87	(31)
2014–2016	Corby Town	47	(27)
2016	Kettering Town	40	(22)
2016	Hednesford Town	4	(1)
2017	Corby Town	7	(1)
2017	Redditch United	23	(14)
2018	Halesowen Town	5	(1)
2018	Rushden & Diamonds	10	(2)
2018-2018	Barwell	2	(0)
2018–2020	Peterborough Sports	7	(2)
2019	→ Gresley (loan)	6	(1)
2020–2021	Spalding United	7	(3)
2021–2022	Melton Town	5	(0)
2022–2023	Pinchbeck United	19	(10)
2023	Anstey Nomads	11	(3)
2023–2026	Grace Dieu	55	(30)

International career^{‡}
2015–2023	Montserrat	18	(3)
- * Club domestic league appearances and goals as of 11:16, 9 July 2021 (UTC) ‡ National team caps and goals as of 08:19, 30 March 2023 (UTC)

Spencer James Andrew Weir-Daley (born 5 September 1985) is a footballer who plays as a striker for Grace Dieu and the Montserrat national team.

He notably played in the Football League for Nottingham Forest, Macclesfield Town, Lincoln City, Bradford City and Notts County before moving into non-league football where he has appeared for Boston United, AFC Telford United, Buxton, Kettering Town, Hednesford Town, Redditch United, Rushden & Diamonds, Barwell, Peterborough Sports, Gresley, Shepshed Dynamo, Spalding United, Melton Town and Pinchbeck United.

In 2015 whilst playing semi-professionally for Corby he was called up to represent Montserrat national team, for the next 8 years he became a vital member of the squad helping them reach the CONCACAF Gold cup preliminary qualifying round against Trinidad & Tobago national team in 2021 he was capped 18 times in total, scoring three goals

== Club career ==
=== Nottingham Forest ===
Born in Leicester, Weir-Daley started his career at Nottingham Forest in 1996 at 10 years old progressing through their Academy and making his debut after successful spells in the youth and reserve teams. He made his debut in a League Cup game against Macclesfield Town and scored on his Football League debut with Forest in a 3–1 away win over Gillingham. After eight first-team appearances, he was side-lined in November by a serious shoulder injury . That would keep him out for the remainder of the 2005–06 season.

In August 2006, Weir-Daley signed on loan for struggling League Two side Macclesfield Town for three months. He played seven league games and scored twice. In January 2007 he moved on loan to another League Two side, Lincoln City, on loan sparking interest in a permanent deal and several other clubs after scoring against MK Dons and then two goals against Walsall, All of which were live on sky TV Including a Man of the Match award in the Walsall match His form brought him into consideration for the League Two February player of the month award, in which he came in 2nd place losing out to Wayne Hennessey of Stockport County.

On 22 March, the deadline for emergency loans, Weir-Daley was signed on loan by League One club Bradford City and scored on his debut a last minute equaliser in a 1–1 draw with AFC Bournemouth After his Bradford City loan spell Weir-Daley was recalled by Nottingham Forest for their League One play-off matches. Weir-Daley played in the 2–0 win over Yeovil Town in the play-off semi-final first leg, which proved to be his final appearance for Forest as he did not feature in the second leg in which they were beaten 5–2 at the City Ground. Weir-Daley later rejected a one-year contract offer stating his pursuit of regular football the reason. He made 11 appearances in total for Forest scoring two goals.

=== Notts County ===
Weir-Daley rejected interest from Bradford to sign a two-year deal with Notts County.

Weir-Daley became the first Notts County striker to score in the 2007–08 season (including pre season), when he scored in his third start of the season in Notts County's 1–1 draw with Rotherham United on 22 September. He was released from his contract in January 2009 five months early by mutual consent along with fellow County player Jay Smith. Weir-Daley had played 48 games for County although only 12 were starts he scored three goals, all of which came in the league.

=== Non-league ===
He joined Boston United in October 2009, scoring 21 goals in the 2009–10 season helping the club to promotion. In May 2011 Spencer was offered a new contract from Boston United and rejected the offer and became a free agent

Rumours circulated of an impending move to Grimsby Town, however in a fans forum on 18 July 2011, joint-managers Paul Hurst and Rob Scott who managed Weir-Daley at Boston, commented that they had no interest in bringing him to Blundell Park.

In late August 2011 he joined AFC Telford United until the end of the 2011–12 season.

In January 2012 he rejoined his former club. On 1 January 2013 Weir-Daley scored his 50th competitive goal for the club in a 2–1 loss to Corby Town after 96 starts and 21 as sub.

Weir-Daley signed for Corby Town on a one-year contract in June 2014, following the expiry of his contract at Boston United. Weir-Daley played a key role as Corby were crowned Champions on the last day of the 2014–15 Southern Football League season scoring twice including the winner in virtually a league playoff decider. Weir-Daley also finished the club's top scorer with 23 goals in 38 starts.

In February 2016, Weir-Daley signed for Southern League club Kettering Town on loan until the end of the season. He scored his first goal for Kettering Town four minutes into his debut in a 2–0 win away at second placed Chippenham Town. Weir-Daley went on to score seven goals in 11 appearances as Kettering narrowly missed out on the playoffs by one point. Weir-Daley re-signed for the 2016–17 season as Kettering were one of the promotion favourites although they had slow start Weir-Daley's goals were still coming including a hat-trick against St Neots Town.

It was announced on 8 December 2016 that Weir-Daley had signed for Northern Premier League team Hednesford Town.

It was announced on 27 July 2017 that Weir-Daley had signed for Southern League Premier Division team Redditch United. He scored his first goal for the club in a pre-season friendly against Midland League side Boldmere St. Michaels in a 3–1 victory for Redditch. Weir-Daley made his competitive debut for Redditch in a 5–0 win against Dunstable Town on the opening day of the 2017–18 season.

He went on to play for AFC Rushden & Diamonds, Barwell and Peterborough Sports, whom he joined in October 2018. He then had spells at Gresley, Shepshed Dynamo and Spalding United. In the 2021-22 season he played for Melton Town and Pinchbeck United. He joined Anstey Nomads in March 2023.

== International career ==
Weir-Daley was called up to Montserrat in March 2015 for the 2018 FIFA World Cup qualifying double-header against Curaçao.

Weir-Daley scored his first international goal for Montserrat on 14 October against Belize in the 2019–20 CONCACAF Nations League qualification to earn a 1–0 win, curling into the top corner from just outside the 18-yard box.

== Career statistics ==
=== International ===
Appearances and goals by national team and year
National team	Year	Apps	Goals
Montserrat	2015	2	0
Montserrat	2016	–	
Montserrat	2017	–	
Montserrat	2018	3	2
Montserrat	2019	7	1
Montserrat	2020	–	
Montserrat	2021	2	0
Montserrat	2022	2	0
Montserrat	2023	2	0
Total		18	3

Scores and results list Montserrat's goal tally first, score column indicates score after each Weir-Daley goal.

List of international goals scored by Spencer Weir-Daley
No.	Date	Venue	Opponent	Score	Result	Competition
1	14 October 2018	Blakes Estate Stadium, Lookout, Montserrat	Belize	1–0	1–0	2019–20 CONCACAF Nations League qualification
2	16 November 2018	Ergilio Hato Stadium, Willemstad, Curaçao	Aruba	1–0	2–0	2019–20 CONCACAF Nations League qualification
3	10 September 2019	Blakes Estate Stadium, Lookout, Montserrat	Saint Lucia	1–0	1–1	2019–20 CONCACAF Nations League B
