= Anfernee Frederick =

Dominican footballer

Personal information
- Date of birth: 23 January 1996 (age 30)
- Place of birth: Roseau, Dominica
- Height: 1.65 m (5 ft 5 in)
- Position: Midfielder

Team information
- Current team: Bath Estate

Senior career*
Years	Team	Apps	(Gls)
2012–2015	Bath Estate		
2015–2017	W Connection		
2017–	Bath Estate		

International career^{‡}
2010	Dominica U17	2	(0)
2014–	Dominica	22	(2)
- * Club domestic league appearances and goals ‡ National team caps and goals as of 15:52, 30 June 2020 (UTC)

Anfernee Frederick (born 23 January 1996) is a Dominican professional footballer who plays as a midfielder for Bath Estate and the Dominica national team.

== Club career ==
Frederick got his career underway with Bath Estate of the Dominica Premier League, where he remained for three years. In 2015, TT Pro League side W Connection completed the signing of Frederick. He made his continental competition debut for the Trinidad and Tobago club on 4 August 2015, featuring for the final eleven minutes of a CONCACAF Champions League group stage defeat away to Liga MX's Santos Laguna. Frederick returned to Bath Estate in 2016.

== International career ==
Frederick appeared for the Dominica U17s in qualifying for the 2011 CONCACAF U-17 Championship in Jamaica, being selected for matches with Guyana and the Netherlands Antilles as Dominica placed last. He won his first cap for the senior squad in an April 2014 friendly with Saint Lucia. Frederick's first competitive appearances for Dominica came in June 2015, when he played in 2018 FIFA World Cup qualification encounters with Canada. He scored his first international goal on 4 March 2019 at the 2019 Windward Islands Tournament against Grenada. He netted again in the succeeding September, scoring versus Suriname in the 2019–20 CONCACAF Nations League B.

== Career statistics ==
=== International ===
As of 30 June 2020.

National team	Year	Apps	Goals
Dominica	2014	2	0
Dominica	2015	3	0
Dominica	2016	4	0
Dominica	2018	3	0
Dominica	2019	10	2
Total		22	2

=== International goals ===
Scores and results list Dominica's goal tally first.

No.	Date	Venue	Cap	Opponent	Score	Result	Competition
1.	2 March 2019	Victoria Park, Kingstown, Saint Vincent and the Grenadines	14	Grenada	1–0	1–0	2019 Windward Islands Tournament
2.	5 September 2019	Windsor Park, Roseau, Dominica	16	Suriname	1–1	1–2	2019–20 CONCACAF Nations League B
