= Bradley Woods-Garness =

English-born Montserratian footballer

Personal information
- Full name: Bradley Maurice Charles Woods-Garness
- Date of birth: 27 June 1986 (age 40)
- Place of birth: Islington, London, England
- Height: 1.73 m (5 ft 8 in)
- Position: Striker

Youth career
- 2000–2003: Chelsea
- 2003–2004: Wycombe Wanderers

Senior career*
Years	Team	Apps	(Gls)
2004–2005	Barnet	0	(0)
2005–2006	Welwyn Garden City		
2006–2007	Farnborough	24	(18)
2007–2009	Billericay Town	39	(33)
2009	→ Dartford (loan)	10	(3)
2009–2012	Sutton United	63	(25)
2009	→ Billericay Town (loan)		
2011–2012	→ Canvey Island (loan)	10	(8)
2012–2013	Canvey Island	39	(24)
2013–2016	Lowestoft Town	49	(4)
2016	→ Tonbridge Angels (loan)	14	(1)
2016	Bishop's Stortford	9	(1)
2016	Cray Wanderers	7	(4)
2016	Cambridge City	3	(1)
2017	Chalfont St Peter	2	(0)
2017	Ware	3	(0)
2017	Whitehawk	4	(1)
2017–2018	Bedford Town	35	(12)
2018	Cheshunt	2	(1)
2018–2019	Corinthian-Casuals	7	(0)
2020	Wingate & Finchley	2	(0)
2023–2024	Tower Hamlets	3	(0)

International career^{‡}
2012–2024	Montserrat	19	(4)
- * Club domestic league appearances and goals as of 23:24, 11 January 2020 (UTC) ‡ National team caps and goals as of 20:40, 21 November 2023 (UTC)

Bradley Maurice Charles Woods-Garness (born 27 June 1986) is an English-born Montserratian footballer who plays as a striker or winger.

He has been capped internationally for Montserrat.

== Career ==
=== Club career ===
As a youth he started out at Chelsea and then Wycombe Wanderers before joining Barnet, playing twice for the first team in the Football League Trophy and Conference League Cup, before establishing himself as a goal scorer, initially at Welwyn Garden City where he was top scorer in the 2005–2006 season, and then at Farnborough, Billericay Town, Sutton United and Canvey Island.

After leaving Lowestoft Town at the end of the 2015–16 season, Woods-Garness started the 2016–17 season at Bishop's Stortford, followed by a number of brief spells at Cray Wanderers, Cambridge City, Chalfont St Peter, and Ware. He finished the season at Whitehawk. On 12 August 2017 he featured for Bedford Town in the Southern League Division One East season opener. Woods-Garnes joined Wingate & Finchley in January 2020.

== International career ==
Woods-Garness was called up to the Montserrat national football team in August 2012, for the 2012 Caribbean Championship First Round qualifiers, held in Martinique. He helped Montserrat achieve their first victory since 1995 and their first ever victory since joining FIFA, beating the British Virgin Islands 7–0. He became Montserrat's joint-record scorer on 22 March 2019, with 4 goals, after scoring the winner in a 2019–20 CONCACAF Nations League qualification game against Cayman Islands.

Woods-Garness also represented England at schoolboy level.

=== International goals ===
Scores and results list Montserrat's goal tally first.

No.	Date	Venue	Opponent	Score	Result	Competition
1.	9 September 2012	Stade Pierre-Aliker, Fort-de-France, Martinique	British Virgin Islands	4–0	7–0	2012 Caribbean Cup qualification
2.	1 April 2015	Blakes Estate Stadium, Lookout, Montserrat	Curaçao	2–1	2–2	2018 FIFA World Cup qualification
3.	16 November 2018	Ergilio Hato Stadium, Willemstad, Curaçao	Aruba	2–0	2–0	2019–20 CONCACAF Nations League qualification
4.	21 March 2019	Ed Bush Stadium, West Bay, Cayman Islands	Cayman Islands	2–1	2–1	2019–20 CONCACAF Nations League qualification

== Personal life ==
Woods-Garness was educated at Highbury Grove School (1997–2002) and Southgate College (2002–2004).

While playing for Sutton United in June 2011, Woods-Garness was arrested and spent six months in prison awaiting trial for allegedly intimidating a witness in a murder trial, in an incident that also involved the then Leyton Orient defender Elliot Omozusi. He was eventually found not guilty and returned to play for Sutton United, having always enjoyed the full support of manager Paul Doswell.

Woods-Garness is also a frequent guest on 'No Behaviour Podcast' hosted by ex-rapper Margs and Loons.

== Honours ==
Sutton United

- Isthmian League: Winner 2010-2011

Lowestoft Town

- Isthmian League: Play-Off Winner 2013-2014
