= Adrian Clifton =

English footballer (born 1988)

Personal information
- Full name: Adrian Lewis Clifton
- Date of birth: 12 December 1988 (age 37)
- Place of birth: Hackney, England
- Position: Forward

Team information
- Current team: Haringey Borough

Youth career
- 2000–2004: Arsenal
- Norwich City
- West Ham United

Senior career*
Years	Team	Apps	(Gls)
2011–2012	Romford	12	(1)
2012–2013	Waltham Forest	30	(10)
2013	East Thurrock United	9	(0)
2013–2015	Maidenhead United	70	(16)
2015–2016	Havant & Waterlooville	14	(2)
2016	→ Staines Town (loan)	4	(0)
2016–2017	Staines Town	31	(8)
2017–2019	Maidenhead United	52	(21)
2019–2020	Bromley	24	(0)
2020–2021	Dagenham & Redbridge	6	(0)
2021–2022	Boreham Wood	27	(1)
2022–2023	Maidenhead United	18	(1)
2023	→ Hampton & Richmond Borough (loan)	14	(1)
2023–2024	Dulwich Hamlet	24	(3)
2024–2025	Hayes & Yeading United	41	(20)
2025–	Haringey Borough	33	(16)

International career^{‡}
2015–2023	Montserrat	23	(6)
- * Club domestic league appearances and goals as of 16:40, 26 July 2025 (UTC) ‡ National team caps and goals as of 19:33, 21 November 2023 (UTC)

Adrian Lewis Clifton (born 12 December 1988) is an English and Montserratian footballer who plays as a forward for Haringey Borough and the Montserrat national team.

== Club career ==
=== Isthmian League ===
Clifton started his career in the youth ranks of Arsenal, developing with the club from the ages of 11 to 15, followed by spells with Norwich City and West Ham United. He served three prison sentences as a youngster before heading into non-league football. During his last prison sentence he featured on Ian Wright's TV show Football Behind Bars.

The midfielder joined Isthmian League Division One North side Romford ahead of the 2011–12 season, having impressed in a pre-season trial. After a short stint playing in the non-pyramid TTFF League for Yalova, Clifton returned and scored on his debut in the FA Cup. Unable to reproduce the form he displayed in the summer, he left the club at the end of the season.

Clifton joined Waltham Forest in August 2012, and took the captain's armband and while featuring regularly for the first team. In April 2013, Clifton left Waltham Forest to join East Thurrock United. Having declined several offers from teams in the Isthmian Division One North, he finally left in order to climb the ranks to the Isthmian Premier Division. His final game for Forest saw him score a hat-trick against Ilford.

=== National League ===
Clifton featured nine times for East Thurrock United in the final month of the season, recording seven wins and two draws. However, in May 2015 he was snapped up by National League South side Maidenhead United, who had been previously watching the midfielder.

He won the Manager's Player of the Season award in 2013/14, and was nicknamed 'Yaya' after comparisons with Yaya Touré. At the end of his second season with the Magpies, he helped the club lift their first Berks & Bucks Senior Cup in four years, scoring in the 4–0 final win over Aylesbury United. After two seasons at York Road, Clifton became Lee Bradbury's first signing at Havant & Waterlooville, joining in the summer of 2015 on a two-year contract.

After suffering an injury that ruled him out for four months, Clifton joined Isthmian League Premier Division side Staines Town on a one-month loan in February 2016. He made four appearances in his time with the club before returning to Havant. He joined Staines permanently for the 2016–17 season.

On 22 July 2017, Maidenhead United's official Twitter account announced that Clifton had once again signed for them. Clifton scored a brace against Bromley on 24 October 2017, though many sources incorrectly stated that he scored a hat-trick. At the end of the 2018–19 season, Clifton won all five awards at the Magpies' end of season awards, winning the Player of the Season awards from each of the players, manager and supporters, the Golden Boot award with 15 goals in all competitions, and the Goal of the Season award.

On 3 May 2019, it was announced that Clifton would join Bromley for the 2019–20 season.

On 18 September 2020, Clifton signed for Dagenham & Redbridge. He was released by Dagenham along with five others in June 2021 following the expiration of his contract.

On 3 September 2021, Clifton signed for Boreham Wood. After coming on as a substitute to score in Wood's FA Cup second round tie with St Albans City, Clifton then repeated the trick against AFC Wimbledon in round three to set up a clash with Championship high-flyers AFC Bournemouth. Clifton came on as a late substitute as Boreham Wood exited the competition in front of a 38,836 crowd at Goodison Park in the fifth round.

On 27 June 2022, Maidenhead United announced that Clifton had re-joined the club for a third spell. On 17 February 2023, he joined Hampton & Richmond Borough on loan. On 22 May, he announced that he was leaving the Magpies.

On 4 June 2023, Dulwich Hamlet announced that Clifton had joined the club ahead of the 2023-24 season.

In July 2025, following a season with Hayes & Yeading United, Clifton joined Spartan South Midlands Premier Division side Haringey Borough.

== International career ==
Clifton made his international debut for Montserrat on 31 March 2015, featuring in a 2–2 draw with Curaçao during 2018 World Cup qualification.

== Personal life ==
Clifton works as a gas engineer.

== Career statistics ==
=== Club ===
As of match played 29 April 2023

Appearances and goals by club, season and competition
Club	Season	League			FA Cup		League Cup		Other		Total	
Club	Season	Division	Apps	Goals	Apps	Goals	Apps	Goals	Apps	Goals	Apps	Goals
Romford	2011–12	Isthmian League Division One North	12	1			—				12	1
Waltham Forest	2011–12	Isthmian League Division One North	5	1			—				5	1
Waltham Forest	2012–13	Isthmian League Division One North	25	9			—				25	9
Waltham Forest	Total		30	10			—				30	10
East Thurrock United	2012–13	Isthmian League Premier Division	9	0			—				9	0
Maidenhead United	2013–14	Conference South	40	7	1	0	—		5	0	46	7
Maidenhead United	2014–15	Conference South	30	9	2	0	—		4	1	36	10
Maidenhead United	Total		70	16	3	0	—		9	1	82	17
Havant & Waterlooville	2015–16	National League South	14	2	4	0	—		3	0	21	2
Staines Town (loan)	2015–16	Isthmian League Premier Division	4	0	0	0	—		0	0	4	0
Staines Town	2016–17	Isthmian League Premier Division	31	8	1	0	—		2	0	34	8
Maidenhead United	2017–18	National League	20	7	2	0	—		2	1	24	8
Maidenhead United	2018–19	National League	32	14	2	1	—		0	0	34	15
Maidenhead United	Total		52	21	4	1	—		2	1	58	23
Bromley	2019–20	National League	24	0	2	0	—		1	0	27	0
Dagenham & Redbridge	2020–21	National League	6	0	0	0	—		0	0	6	0
Boreham Wood	2021–22	National League	27	1	6	2	—		3	0	36	3
Maidenhead United	2022–23	National League	18	1	2	0	—		3	0	23	1
Hampton & Richmond Borough (loan)	2022–23	National League South	14	1	0	0	—		0	0	14	1
Career total			311	61	22	3	—		23	2	356	66

=== International ===
As of match played 20 November 2023

Appearances and goals by national team and year
National team	Year	Apps	Goals
Montserrat	2015	1	0
Montserrat	2018	3	0
Montserrat	2019	5	2
Montserrat	2021	3	2
Montserrat	2022	3	2
Montserrat	2023	8	0
Total		23	6

==== International goals ====
Scores and results list Montserrat's goal tally first.

International goals by date, venue, cap, opponent, score, result and competition
No.	Date	Venue	Cap	Opponent	Score	Result	Competition
1	22 March 2019	Ed Bush Stadium, West Bay, Cayman Islands	5	Cayman Islands	1–0	2–1	2019–20 CONCACAF Nations League qualification
2	7 September 2019	Blakes Estate Stadium, Look Out, Montserrat	6	Dominican Republic	2–1	2–1	2019–20 CONCACAF Nations League B
3	2 June 2021	Estadio Panamericano, San Cristóbal, Dominican Republic	11	U.S. Virgin Islands	3–0	4–0	2022 FIFA World Cup qualification
4	2 June 2021	Estadio Panamericano, San Cristóbal, Dominican Republic	11	U.S. Virgin Islands	4–0	4–0	2022 FIFA World Cup qualification
5	5 June 2022	Félix Sánchez Olympic Stadium, Santo Domingo, Dominican Republic	13	Guyana	1–0	1–2	2022–23 CONCACAF Nations League B
6	12 June 2022	Félix Sánchez Olympic Stadium, Santo Domingo, Dominican Republic	15	Bermuda	2–1	3–2	2022–23 CONCACAF Nations League B

== Honours ==
Maidenhead United

- Berks & Bucks Senior Cup: 2014–15, 2016–17 (final played in 2017–18 pre-season)
