= 2019–20 CONCACAF Nations League qualifying =

Tournament details
- Dates: 6 September 2018 – 24 March 2019
- Teams: 34

Tournament statistics
- Matches played: 68
- Goals scored: 264 (3.88 per match)
- Top scorer(s): (Curaçao) Rangelo Janga (Haiti) Duckens Nazon (6 goals each)

The qualifying phase of the 2019–20 CONCACAF Nations League was a one-off tournament that took place from 6 September 2018 to 24 March 2019. The qualifying determined the seeding for the group phase of the inaugural tournament, as well as determining the remaining ten teams that qualified for the 2019 CONCACAF Gold Cup.

== Format ==
Apart from the six teams which participated in the 2018 FIFA World Cup qualifying hexagonal, the other 34 teams (Guatemala could not enter due to FIFA suspension after missing the deadline of 1 March 2018) entered qualifying. The format for the qualifying stage was based on the Pots System, developed by Chilean Leandro Shara. Under that format, the teams are divided into pots for scheduling purposes only, and all teams face rivals from each pot, and all teams are placed under one general standing (without groups). Subsequently, the 34 teams were divided into four pots, and each team played four matches, two home and two away. Based on their results in the general standing, the teams were divided into tiers for the group phase of the inaugural edition of the CONCACAF Nations League:

- The top six teams qualified for League A to join the six hexagonal participants.
- The next sixteen teams qualified for League B.
- The last twelve teams qualified for League C to join Guatemala.

Moreover, the top ten teams qualified for the 2019 CONCACAF Gold Cup to join the six hexagonal participants.

=== Tiebreakers ===
The ranking of teams in qualifying was determined as follows:

1. Points obtained in all qualifying matches;
2. Goal difference in all qualifying matches;
3. Number of goals scored in all qualifying matches;
4. Number of away goals scored in all qualifying matches;
5. Fair play points in all qualifying matches (only one deduction could be applied to a player in a single match):
  - Yellow card: –1 point;
  - Indirect red card (second yellow card): –3 points;
  - Direct red card: –4 points;
  - Yellow card and direct red card: –5 points;
6. Drawing of lots.

== Seeding ==
The 34 teams were seeded into four pots based on their position in the March 2018 CONCACAF Ranking Index (shown in parentheses). Pots A and D contained 8 teams, while pots B and C contained 9 teams. Teams in bold qualified for the final tournament.

Pot A
Team	Rank
**Jamaica**	6
**Canada**	7
**Haiti**	9
**El Salvador**	10
**Martinique**	12
**Cuba**	13
French Guiana	14
Guadeloupe	15

Pot B
Team	Rank
**Nicaragua**	16
Saint Kitts and Nevis	17
**Curaçao**	18
Suriname	19
Antigua and Barbuda	20
Dominican Republic	21
**Bermuda**	22
**Guyana**	23
Belize	24

Pot C
Team	Rank
Bonaire	25
Grenada	26
Saint Vincent and the Grenadines	27
Saint Lucia	28
Barbados	29
Puerto Rico	30
Bahamas	31
Dominica	32
Aruba	33

Pot D
Team	Rank
Cayman Islands	34
Turks and Caicos Islands	35
Montserrat	36
U.S. Virgin Islands	37
Saint Martin	38
Sint Maarten	39
Anguilla	40
British Virgin Islands	41

== Schedule and match pairings ==
The order of the match pairings per each FIFA match window was as follows:

Matchday	Dates	Pot pairings	Matches
Matchday 1	6–11 September 2018	Pot A v Pot D, Pot B v Pot C	B2 v C7, A6 v D5, D3 v A8, D8 v A1, C9 v B6, C1 v B8, B3 v C6, A3 v D4, A4 v D6, B9 v C2, D7 v A2, C5 v B4, D2 v A5, A7 v D1, B7 v C8, B1 v C3, C4 v B5
Matchday 2	11–16 October 2018	Pot A v Pot C, Pot B v Pot D, 1 team from Pot B v 1 team from Pot C	D6 v B7, A2 v C8, B6 v D1, B4 v D4, C6 v A7, B5 v D8, B8 v D5, C3 v B3, D7 v B1, A5 v C9, C7 v A6, C2 v A4, A8 v C1, D2 v B2, D3 v B9, A1 v C4, C5 v A3
Matchday 3	16–20 November 2018	Pot A v Pot B, Pot C v Pot D, 1 team from Pot B v 1 team from Pot C	C2 v D2, D6 v C4, A1 v B7, D5 v C5, B2 v A8, A4 v B4, B5 v A7, C3 v D8, C8 v D3, D1 v C1, B9 v A5, A3 v B8, C9 v D7, D4 v C6, A6 v B3, B6 v A2, B1 v C7
Matchday 4	21–24 March 2019	Pot A v Pot A, Pot B v Pot B, Pot C v Pot C, Pot D v Pot D, 1 team from Pot B v 1 team from Pot C	A8 v A1, B3 v B9, B4 v B6, A7 v A4, C8 v B5, D1 v D2, D4 v D7, B8 v B2, C6 v C9, C7 v C2, A5 v A6, C1 v C3, D5 v D6, B7 v B1, A2 v A3, C4 v C5, D8 v D3

The draw of the qualifying fixtures was held on 7 March 2018, 10:00 EST (UTC−5), at The Temple House in Miami Beach, Florida, United States, directly after the launch event of the CONCACAF Nations League. A computerized pre-draw produced a "master schedule", creating 17 fixtures for each matchday. The teams in each pot were then drawn to the corresponding positions in the schedule (A1–A8, B1–B9, C1–C9, D1–D8). The computer model assured that no teams face each other more than once, and that each team plays two home and two away matches.

The result of the draw was as follows:

Pot A
Pos	Team
A1	French Guiana
A2	El Salvador
A3	Jamaica
A4	Cuba
A5	Guadeloupe
A6	Martinique
A7	Haiti
A8	Canada

Pot B
Pos	Team
B1	Belize
B2	Saint Kitts and Nevis
B3	Antigua and Barbuda
B4	Dominican Republic
B5	Nicaragua
B6	Bermuda
B7	Guyana
B8	Suriname
B9	Curaçao

Pot C
Pos	Team
C1	Dominica
C2	Grenada
C3	Bahamas
C4	Saint Vincent and the Grenadines
C5	Bonaire
C6	Saint Lucia
C7	Puerto Rico
C8	Barbados
C9	Aruba

Pot D
Pos	Team
D1	Sint Maarten
D2	Saint Martin
D3	U.S. Virgin Islands
D4	Cayman Islands
D5	British Virgin Islands
D6	Turks and Caicos Islands
D7	Montserrat
D8	Anguilla

== Standings ==
Pos	Team	Pld	W	D	L	GF	GA	GD	Pts	Qualification
1	Haiti	4	4	0	0	19	2	+17	12	Qualification for League A and 2019 CONCACAF Gold Cup
2	Canada	4	4	0	0	18	1	+17	12	Qualification for League A and 2019 CONCACAF Gold Cup
3	Martinique	4	4	0	0	10	2	+8	12	Qualification for League A and 2019 CONCACAF Gold Cup
4	Curaçao	4	3	0	1	22	2	+20	9	Qualification for League A and 2019 CONCACAF Gold Cup
5	Bermuda	4	3	0	1	17	4	+13	9	Qualification for League A and 2019 CONCACAF Gold Cup
6	Cuba	4	3	0	1	15	2	+13	9	Qualification for League A and 2019 CONCACAF Gold Cup
7	Guyana	4	3	0	1	14	3	+11	9	Qualification for League B and 2019 CONCACAF Gold Cup
8	Jamaica	4	3	0	1	12	3	+9	9	Qualification for League B and 2019 CONCACAF Gold Cup
9	Nicaragua	4	3	0	1	9	2	+7	9	Qualification for League B and 2019 CONCACAF Gold Cup
10	El Salvador	4	3	0	1	7	2	+5	9	Qualification for League B and 2019 CONCACAF Gold Cup
11	Montserrat	4	3	0	1	6	3	+3	9	Qualification for League B
12	Suriname	4	2	1	1	8	2	+6	7	Qualification for League B
13	Saint Lucia	4	2	1	1	7	4	+3	7	Qualification for League B
14	Dominica	4	2	1	1	6	5	+1	7	Qualification for League B
15	Saint Kitts and Nevis	4	2	0	2	11	3	+8	6	Qualification for League B
16	Dominican Republic	4	2	0	2	9	4	+5	6	Qualification for League B
17	Belize	4	2	0	2	6	3	+3	6	Qualification for League B
18	Antigua and Barbuda	4	2	0	2	10	8	+2	6	Qualification for League B
19	French Guiana	4	2	0	2	8	6	+2	6	Qualification for League B
20	Saint Vincent and the Grenadines	4	2	0	2	5	6	−1	6	Qualification for League B
21	Grenada	4	2	0	2	7	14	−7	6	Qualification for League B
22	Aruba	4	1	1	2	5	6	−1	4	Qualification for League B
23	Guadeloupe	4	1	1	2	3	7	−4	4	Qualification for League C
24	Turks and Caicos Islands	4	1	1	2	5	23	−18	4	Qualification for League C
25	Barbados	4	1	0	3	3	7	−4	3	Qualification for League C
26	Bonaire	4	1	0	3	3	14	−11	3	Qualification for League C
27	U.S. Virgin Islands	4	1	0	3	3	16	−13	3	Qualification for League C
28	Sint Maarten	4	1	0	3	4	30	−26	3	Qualification for League C
29	Cayman Islands	4	0	1	3	1	9	−8	1	Qualification for League C
30	British Virgin Islands	4	0	1	3	3	13	−10	1	Qualification for League C
31	Anguilla	4	0	1	3	1	15	−14	1 (Note: Away goals: Anguilla 1, Bahamas 0.)	Qualification for League C
32	Bahamas	4	0	1	3	1	15	−14	1	Qualification for League C
33	Puerto Rico	4	0	0	4	0	5	−5	0	Qualification for League C
34	Saint Martin	4	0	0	4	5	22	−17	0	Qualification for League C

Source: CONCACAF

== Summary ==
Team 1	Score	Team 2
Matchday 1
Dominica	0–0	Suriname
Guyana	3–0 (Note: CONCACAF awarded Guyana a 3–0 win as a result of Barbados fielding the ineligible players Hallam Hope and Krystian Pearce. The Barbados FA had not completed a request with FIFA to change association of the former England youth internationals. The match originally ended 2–2.)	Barbados
Anguilla	0–5	French Guiana
Antigua and Barbuda	0–3	Saint Lucia
Belize	4–0	Bahamas
Saint Vincent and the Grenadines	0–2	Nicaragua
Cuba	11–0	Turks and Caicos Islands
Montserrat	1–2	El Salvador
U.S. Virgin Islands	0–8	Canada
Bonaire	0–5	Dominican Republic
Aruba	3–1	Bermuda
Saint Kitts and Nevis	1–0	Puerto Rico
Jamaica	4–0	Cayman Islands
Haiti	13–0	Sint Maarten
Curaçao	10–0	Grenada
Saint Martin	0–3	Guadeloupe
Martinique	4–0	British Virgin Islands
Matchday 2
French Guiana	0–1	Saint Vincent and the Grenadines
U.S. Virgin Islands	0–5	Curaçao
Bahamas	0–6	Antigua and Barbuda
Bermuda	12–0	Sint Maarten
Dominican Republic	3–0	Cayman Islands
Grenada	0–2	Cuba
Turks and Caicos Islands	0–8	Guyana
Puerto Rico	0–1	Martinique
Suriname	5–0	British Virgin Islands
El Salvador	3–0	Barbados
Saint Martin	0–10	Saint Kitts and Nevis
Montserrat	1–0	Belize
Bonaire	0–6	Jamaica
Nicaragua	6–0	Anguilla
Canada	5–0	Dominica
Guadeloupe	0–0	Aruba
Saint Lucia	1–2	Haiti
Matchday 3
Grenada	5–2	Saint Martin
Bermuda	1–0	El Salvador
Aruba	0–2	Montserrat
Belize	1–0	Puerto Rico
Cuba	1–0	Dominican Republic
Jamaica	2–1	Suriname
Nicaragua	0–2	Haiti
Cayman Islands	0–0	Saint Lucia
Turks and Caicos Islands	3–2	Saint Vincent and the Grenadines
Bahamas	1–1	Anguilla
Barbados	3–0	U.S. Virgin Islands
Saint Kitts and Nevis	0–1	Canada
Martinique	4–2	Antigua and Barbuda
Curaçao	6–0	Guadeloupe
Sint Maarten	0–2	Dominica
French Guiana	2–1	Guyana
British Virgin Islands	1–2	Bonaire
Matchday 4
British Virgin Islands	2–2	Turks and Caicos Islands
Saint Vincent and the Grenadines	2–1	Bonaire
Anguilla	0–3	U.S. Virgin Islands
Saint Lucia	3–2	Aruba
Cayman Islands	1–2	Montserrat
Dominica	4–0	Bahamas
Sint Maarten	4–3	Saint Martin
Antigua and Barbuda	2–1	Curaçao
Suriname	2–0	Saint Kitts and Nevis
Guyana	2–1	Belize
Guadeloupe	0–1	Martinique
El Salvador	2–0	Jamaica
Puerto Rico	0–2	Grenada
Dominican Republic	1–3	Bermuda
Canada	4–1	French Guiana
Haiti	2–1	Cuba
Barbados	0–1	Nicaragua

== Matches ==
The match dates were announced on 29 May 2018, with the venues announced in August and September 2018. The March 2019 match schedule was revised by CONCACAF in January 2019.

Times in September, October and March are Eastern Daylight Time (UTC−4), while times in November are Eastern Standard Time (UTC−5), as listed by CONCACAF. If the venue was located in a different time zone, the local time is also given.

=== Matchday 1 ===
6 September 2018
16:00

Dominica	0–0	Suriname
	Report

Stade René Serge Nabajoth, Les Abymes (Guadeloupe) (Note: Dominica played their home match against Suriname in Guadeloupe.)
Referee: Tristley Bassue (Saint Kitts and Nevis)

6 September 2018
19:00

Guyana	3–0 Awarded	Barbados
Bobb 46'; Danns 78'	Report	Hope 65', 73'

Synthetic Track and Field Facility, Leonora
Attendance: 1,505
Referee: William Anderson (Puerto Rico)

7 September 2018
16:00

Anguilla	0–5	French Guiana
	Report	Lauristin 15'; Torvic 29'; Éric 38' (pen.); Issorat 55'; Rino 83'

Raymond E. Guishard Technical Centre, The Valley
Referee: Karl Tyrell (Jamaica)

7 September 2018
18:00

Antigua and Barbuda	0–3	Saint Lucia
	Report	Williams 50'; Remy 67'; Macfarlane 90'

Sir Vivian Richards Stadium, North Sound
Referee: Sherwin Johnson (Guyana)

7 September 2018
20:00 (18:00 UTC−6)

Belize	4–0	Bahamas
McCaulay 40'; Miller 44' (o.g.); Lopez 80', 90+5'	Report

Isidoro Beaton Stadium, Belmopan
Referee: Marcos Brea (Cuba)

8 September 2018
15:00

Saint Vincent and the Grenadines	0–2	Nicaragua
	Report	Niño 27'; Barrera 39'

Arnos Vale Stadium, Arnos Vale
Referee: Reon Radix (Grenada)

8 September 2018
16:30

Cuba	11–0	Turks and Caicos Islands
Paradela 7', 36', 49'; Morris 32', 83'; Baquero 35', 45'; Santa Cruz 52', 54'; Caballero 65', 77'	Report

Estadio Pedro Marrero, Havana
Referee: Kevin Morrison (Jamaica)

8 September 2018
19:00

Montserrat	1–2	El Salvador
Taylor 38'	Report	Cerén 62', 90+4'

Blakes Estate Stadium, Lookout
Referee: Sherwin Moore (Guyana)

9 September 2018
16:00

U.S. Virgin Islands	0–8	Canada
	Report	Osorio 6'; Cavallini 9', 45'; David 32', 37'; Hoilett 50'; Larin 60', 80'

IMG Academy, Bradenton (United States) (Note: The U.S. Virgin Islands played their home matches in the United States.)
Attendance: 150
Referee: Moeth Gaymes (Saint Vincent and the Grenadines)

9 September 2018
16:00

Bonaire	0–5	Dominican Republic
	Report	Peralta 66', 75', 88'; López 86'; Heredia 90+1'

Ergilio Hato Stadium, Willemstad (Curaçao) (Note: Bonaire played their home matches in Curaçao.)
Referee: Patrick Senecharles (Haiti)

9 September 2018
18:00

Aruba	3–1	Bermuda
Gómez 7'; Baten 11' (pen.); de Gouveia 50'	Report	Smith 21'

Ergilio Hato Stadium, Willemstad (Curaçao) (Note: Aruba played their home matches in Curaçao.)
Referee: Sergio Reyna (Guatemala)

9 September 2018
20:00

Saint Kitts and Nevis	1–0	Puerto Rico
Panayiotou 90+1'	Report

Warner Park, Basseterre
Referee: Johannes Dolaini (Suriname)

9 September 2018
20:00 (19:00 UTC−5)

Jamaica	4–0	Cayman Islands
Mattocks 2', 58'; Burke 35', 66'	Report

National Stadium, Kingston
Referee: Bryan López (Guatemala)

10 September 2018
18:30

Haiti	13–0	Sint Maarten
Pierrot 11', 72'; Nazon 19', 35', 42', 61', 64'; Forsythe 26' (o.g.); Hérold 47'; Arcus 59'; Etienne 71'; Mustivar 86'; Louis 88'	Report

Stade Sylvio Cator, Port-au-Prince
Referee: Nitzar Sandoval (Nicaragua)

10 September 2018
20:00

Curaçao	10–0	Grenada
Hooi 11'; C. Martina 19'; Kuwas 23'; Bacuna 53', 68'; Janga 59', 84', 88'; Nepomuceno 63'; Leuteria 90+1'	Report

Ergilio Hato Stadium, Willemstad
Referee: Hugo Cruz (Costa Rica)

11 September 2018
16:00

Saint Martin	0–3	Guadeloupe
	Report	David 7'; Gendrey 27'; Passape 65'

Raymond E. Guishard Technical Centre, The Valley (Anguilla) (Note: Saint Martin played their home matches in Anguilla.)
Referee: Ricangel de Leça (Aruba)

16 October 2018 (Note: The Martinique v British Virgin Islands match, originally scheduled on 11 September 2018, 20:00 EDT, was postponed due to the potential impact of Hurricane Isaac on Martinique. The match was rescheduled to 16 October 2018, 19:00 EDT.)
19:00

Martinique	4–0	British Virgin Islands
Parsemain 65', 90+1'; Biron 83', 90+2'	Report

Stade Pierre-Aliker, Fort-de-France
Referee: Jorge Pérez (Mexico)

=== Matchday 2 ===
11 October 2018
19:30 (20:30 UTC−3)

French Guiana	0–1	Saint Vincent and the Grenadines
	Report	Solomon 60' (pen.)

Stade Municipal Dr. Edmard Lama, Cayenne
Referee: Ismael Cornejo (El Salvador)

12 October 2018
16:00

U.S. Virgin Islands	0–5	Curaçao
	Report	Janga 29'; Nepomuceno 33'; Bacuna 53' (pen.); Greene 55' (o.g.); Martinus 89'

IMG Academy, Bradenton (United States)
Referee: Jamar Springer (Barbados)

12 October 2018
18:00

Bahamas	0–6	Antigua and Barbuda
	Report	Weston 12' (pen.), 43' (pen.), 77'; Byers 15'; Jahraldo-Martin 40', 68'

Thomas Robinson Stadium, Nassau
Referee: Raúl Castro (Honduras)

12 October 2018
18:30 (19:30 UTC−3)

Bermuda	12–0	Sint Maarten
Lambe 10' (pen.), 17', 84'; Simmons 13'; Lewis 28', 40', 88'; Ming 37'; Bascome 43'; Evans 52'; Tyrell 62'; Leverock 73'	Report

Bermuda National Stadium, Hamilton
Referee: Daneon Parchment (Jamaica)

12 October 2018
20:00

Dominican Republic	3–0	Cayman Islands
Bonnín 21'; Rodríguez 25'; Peña 76'	Report

Estadio Cibao FC, Santiago de los Caballeros
Referee: Carl-Henry Elie (Haiti)

12 October 2018
20:00

Grenada	0–2	Cuba
	Report	Paradela 21'; Santa Cruz 65'

Kirani James Athletic Stadium, St. George's
Attendance: 1,856
Referee: Juan Gabriel Calderón (Costa Rica)

13 October 2018
16:00

Turks and Caicos Islands	0–8	Guyana
	Report	Holder 7', 37', 45'; Welshman 20', 69', 81' (pen.); Bobb 45+2'; Daniel 77'

TCIFA National Academy, Providenciales
Referee: Oliver Vergara (Panama)

13 October 2018 (Note: The Puerto Rico v Martinique match, originally scheduled on 15 October 2018, 16:00 EDT, was rescheduled to 13 October 2018, 16:00 EDT, due to the rescheduling of the Martinique v British Virgin Islands match.)
16:00

Puerto Rico	0–1	Martinique
	Report	Parsemain 47'

Juan Ramón Loubriel Stadium, Bayamón
Attendance: 2,756
Referee: Héctor Rodríguez (Honduras)

13 October 2018
18:30 (19:30 UTC−3)

Suriname	5–0	British Virgin Islands
Rijssel 23', 76'; Elshot 43'; D. Fer 66'; Comvalius 82'	Report

André Kamperveen Stadion, Paramaribo
Attendance: 1,707
Referee: Bryan López (Guatemala)

13 October 2018
22:00 (20:00 UTC−6)

El Salvador	3–0	Barbados
Bonilla 22'; Baires 43'; Mayen 90+2'	Report

Estadio Cuscatlán, San Salvador
Attendance: 13,700
Referee: Gladwyn Johnson (Guyana)

14 October 2018
16:00

Saint Martin	0–10	Saint Kitts and Nevis
	Report	Harris 6', 12', 64'; Noubon 16' (o.g.); Panayiotou 26', 81'; Wharton 30', 90+1'; Sterling-James 38'; Rogers 77'

Raymond E. Guishard Technical Centre, The Valley (Anguilla)
Referee: William Anderson (Puerto Rico)

14 October 2018
18:00

Montserrat	1–0	Belize
Weir-Daley 74'	Report

Blakes Estate Stadium, Lookout
Referee: Edgar Rangel (Mexico)

14 October 2018
18:00

Bonaire	0–6	Jamaica
	Report	Burke 14'; Morris 43', 51'; Gordon 48'; Vassell 58'; Kelly 81'

Ergilio Hato Stadium, Willemstad (Curaçao)
Referee: Sherwin Moore (Guyana)

14 October 2018
19:00 (17:00 UTC−6)

Nicaragua	6–0	Anguilla
Moreno 1', 39'; López 4'; Barrera 22', 28', 42'	Report

Estadio Eladio Rosabal Cordero, Heredia (Costa Rica) (Note: Nicaragua played their home match against Anguilla in Costa Rica due to security concerns caused by civil unrest in Nicaragua.)
Referee: Germán Martínez (El Salvador)

16 October 2018
19:00

Canada	5–0	Dominica
David 3'; Hoilett 14'; Cavallini 18' (pen.); Joseph 47' (o.g.); Larin 82'	Report

BMO Field, Toronto
Attendance: 10,253
Referee: Oscar Macías (Mexico)

16 October 2018
20:00

Guadeloupe	0–0	Aruba
	Report

Stade René Serge Nabajoth, Les Abymes
Referee: Nima Saghafi (United States)

16 October 2018 (Note: The Saint Lucia v Haiti match, originally scheduled on 13 October 2018, 20:00 EDT, was rescheduled to 16 October 2018, 21:15 EDT, and moved from Darren Sammy Cricket Ground, Gros Islet to Stade Pierre-Aliker, Fort-de-France in Martinique.)
21:15

Saint Lucia	1–2	Haiti
Williams 43'	Report	Mustivar 13'; Hérold Jr. 33'

Stade Pierre-Aliker, Fort-de-France (Martinique)
Referee: Trevester Richards (Saint Kitts and Nevis)

=== Matchday 3 ===
16 November 2018
17:00 (18:00 UTC−4)

Grenada	5–2	Saint Martin
J. Charles 15', 21'; Hinkson 40'; Paterson 49', 84'	Report	Joachim 45'; Cocks 62'

Kirani James Athletic Stadium, St. George's
Referee: Ricangel de Leça (Aruba)

16 November 2018
19:00 (20:00 UTC−4)

Bermuda	1–0	El Salvador
Wells 71'	Report

Bermuda National Stadium, Hamilton
Referee: William Anderson (Puerto Rico)

16 November 2018
20:00 (21:00 UTC−4)

Aruba	0–2	Montserrat
	Report	Weir-Daley 36'; Woods-Garness 51'

Ergilio Hato Stadium, Willemstad (Curaçao)
Referee: Johannes Dolaini (Suriname)

16 November 2018
21:00 (20:00 UTC−6)

Belize	1–0	Puerto Rico
Casey 31'	Report

Isidoro Beaton Stadium, Belmopan
Referee: Nitzar Sandoval (Nicaragua)

17 November 2018
15:30

Cuba	1–0	Dominican Republic
Santa Cruz 83'	Report

Estadio Pedro Marrero, Havana
Referee: Sherwin Moore (Guyana)

17 November 2018
19:00

Jamaica	2–1	Suriname
Burke 7'; Mattocks 16' (pen.)	Report	D. Fer 36'

Montego Bay Sports Complex, Montego Bay
Referee: Tristley Bassue (Saint Kitts and Nevis)

17 November 2018
20:00 (19:00 UTC−6)

Nicaragua	0–2	Haiti
	Report	Cantave 12'; Etienne 31'

Estadio Nacional de Fútbol, Managua
Referee: Drew Fischer (Canada)

17 November 2018
20:00

Cayman Islands	0–0	Saint Lucia
	Report

Truman Bodden Sports Complex, George Town
Referee: Yadel Martínez (Cuba)

18 November 2018
15:00

Turks and Caicos Islands	3–2	Saint Vincent and the Grenadines
Forbes 7', 43'; Francois 89'	Report	Sutherland 86'; McBurnette 88'

TCIFA National Academy, Providenciales
Referee: Charvis Delsol (Dominica)

18 November 2018
18:00

Bahamas	1–1	Anguilla
Jean 62'	Report	Rogers 30'

Thomas Robinson Stadium, Nassau
Referee: Germán Martínez (El Salvador)

18 November 2018
18:00 (19:00 UTC−4)

Barbados	3–0	U.S. Virgin Islands
Holligan 25'; Sargeant 80'; Harte 89'	Report

Wildey Astro Turf, Wildey
Referee: Sergio Reyna (Guatemala)

18 November 2018
19:00 (20:00 UTC−4)

Saint Kitts and Nevis	0–1	Canada
	Report	Hutchinson 44'

Warner Park, Basseterre
Referee: Kevin Morrison (Jamaica)

19 November 2018
19:00 (20:00 UTC−4)

Martinique	4–2	Antigua and Barbuda
Abaul 12'; Crétinoir 23'; Jougon 25'; Parsemain 43'	Report	Weston 17'; Griffith 90+1'

Stade Pierre-Aliker, Fort-de-France
Referee: Ted Unkel (United States)

19 November 2018
19:00 (20:00 UTC−4)

Curaçao	6–0	Guadeloupe
Nepomuceno 39', 61'; Hooi 58', 79'; Janga 77', 90'	Report

Ergilio Hato Stadium, Willemstad
Referee: Jaime Herrera (El Salvador)

20 November 2018
13:45 (14:45 UTC−4)

Sint Maarten	0–2	Dominica
	Report	Wade 6'; R. Peltier 52'

Raymond E. Guishard Technical Centre, The Valley (Anguilla) (Note: Sint Maarten played their home matches in Anguilla.)
Referee: Luis Enrique Santander (Mexico)

20 November 2018
17:30 (19:30 UTC−3)

French Guiana	2–1	Guyana
J. Haabo 18', 46'	Report	Danns 59'

Stade Municipal Dr. Edmard Lama, Cayenne
Referee: Carl-Henry Elie (Haiti)

24 March 2019 (Note: The British Virgin Islands v Bonaire match, originally scheduled on 16 November 2018, 13:45 EST (14:45 UTC−4), was rescheduled to 24 March 2019, 15:00 EDT, due to canceled flights of the teams.)
15:00

British Virgin Islands	1–2	Bonaire
Wilson 76' (pen.)	Report	Windster 7', 88'

Raymond E. Guishard Technical Centre, The Valley (Anguilla) (Note: The British Virgin Islands played their home matches in Anguilla.)
Referee: Kevin Morrison (Jamaica)

=== Matchday 4 ===
21 March 2019
15:00 (Note: The British Virgin Islands v Turks and Caicos Islands match, originally scheduled on 21 March 2019, 16:00 EDT, was later moved to 15:00 EDT.)

British Virgin Islands	2–2	Turks and Caicos Islands
Caesar 64'; Wiltshire 83'	Report	Forbes 86'; Dorvil 87'

Raymond E. Guishard Technical Centre, The Valley (Anguilla)
Referee: Moeth Gaymes (Saint Vincent and the Grenadines)

21 March 2019 (Note: The Saint Vincent and the Grenadines v Bonaire match, originally scheduled on 22 March 2019, 15:00 EDT, was rescheduled to 21 March 2019, 15:00 EDT, due to the rescheduling of the British Virgin Islands v Bonaire match.)
15:00

Saint Vincent and the Grenadines	2–1	Bonaire
Windster 77' (o.g.); Cunningham 79'	Report	Koffy 37'

Arnos Vale Stadium, Arnos Vale
Referee: José Torres (Puerto Rico)

22 March 2019
15:00 (Note: The Anguilla v U.S. Virgin Islands match, originally scheduled on 22 March 2019, 18:00 EDT, was later moved to 15:00 EDT.)

Anguilla	0–3	U.S. Virgin Islands
	Report	Mack 15'; Pierre 26'; Dennis 86'

Raymond E. Guishard Technical Centre, The Valley
Referee: Tristley Bassue (Saint Kitts and Nevis)

22 March 2019 (Note: The Saint Lucia v Aruba match, originally scheduled on 25 March 2019, 18:00 EDT, was rescheduled to 22 March 2019, 18:00 EDT, and moved from Darren Sammy Cricket Ground, Gros Islet to Sir Vivian Richards Stadium, North Sound (Antigua and Barbuda).)
18:00

Saint Lucia	3–2	Aruba
Macfarlane 38', 62'; L. Joseph 67'	Report	John 53'; Gross 90+2'

Sir Vivian Richards Stadium, North Sound (Antigua and Barbuda)
Referee: Sherwin Johnson (Guyana)

22 March 2019
19:30 (18:30 UTC−5)

Cayman Islands	1–2	Montserrat
M. Ebanks 49'	Report	Clifton 40' (pen.); Woods-Garness 66'

Ed Bush Stadium, West Bay
Referee: Sergio Reyna (Guatemala)

23 March 2019 (Note: The Dominica v Bahamas match, originally scheduled on 26 March 2019, 18:00 EDT, was rescheduled to 23 March 2019, 14:30 EDT, and moved from Stade René Serge Nabajoth, Les Abymes (Guadeloupe) to Windsor Park, Roseau.)
14:30

Dominica	4–0	Bahamas
Wade 24', 35'; T. Joseph 30'; Thomas 85'	Report

Windsor Park, Roseau
Referee: Raúl Castro (Honduras)

23 March 2019 (Note: The Sint Maarten v Saint Martin match, originally scheduled on 25 March 2019, 20:00 EDT, was rescheduled to 23 March 2019, 15:00 EDT.)
15:00

Sint Maarten	4–3	Saint Martin
Cocks 10' (o.g.); Lake 23', 59'; Boelijn 30' (pen.)	Report	Arrondell 11'; Cocks 52'; Dupalus 80' (pen.)

Raymond E. Guishard Technical Centre, The Valley (Anguilla)
Referee: Charvis Delsol (Dominica)

23 March 2019 (Note: The Antigua and Barbuda v Curaçao match, originally scheduled on 25 March 2019, 18:00 EDT, was rescheduled to 23 March 2019, 18:00 EDT.)
18:00

Antigua and Barbuda	2–1	Curaçao
Osbourne 1'; Benjamin 49'	Report	Kastaneer 37'

Sir Vivian Richards Stadium, North Sound
Referee: Randy Encarnación (Dominican Republic)

23 March 2019
18:30 (19:30 UTC−3)

Suriname	2–0	Saint Kitts and Nevis
Rijssel 38'; Comvalius 71'	Report

André Kamperveen Stadion, Paramaribo
Referee: Erick Lezama (Nicaragua)

23 March 2019
18:30 (Note: The Guyana v Belize match, originally scheduled on 23 March 2019, 18:00 EDT, was later moved to 18:30 EDT.)

Guyana	2–1	Belize
Danns 16' (pen.); Welshman 43'	Report	Kuylen 25'

Synthetic Track and Field Facility, Leonora
Referee: Ricangel de Leça (Aruba)

23 March 2019
20:00

Guadeloupe	0–1	Martinique
	Report	Jobello 63'

Stade René Serge Nabajoth, Les Abymes
Referee: Ismael Cornejo (El Salvador)

23 March 2019
22:00 (20:00 UTC−6)

El Salvador	2–0	Jamaica
Bonilla 49'; Lowe 85' (o.g.)	Report

Estadio Cuscatlán, San Salvador
Referee: Juan Gabriel Calderón (Costa Rica)

24 March 2019
16:00

Puerto Rico	0–2	Grenada
	Report	German 27'; Paterson 74'

Juan Ramón Loubriel Stadium, Bayamón
Attendance: 1,457
Referee: Trevester Richards (Saint Kitts and Nevis)

24 March 2019
17:00

Dominican Republic	1–3	Bermuda
Peña 3'	Report	Lewis 15'; Wells 64'; Donawa 74'

Estadio Cibao, Santiago de los Caballeros (Note: The Dominican Republic v Bermuda match, originally scheduled to be held at the Estadio Panamericano, San Cristóbal, was later moved to the Estadio Cibao, Santiago de los Caballeros.)
Referee: Patrick Senecharles (Haiti)

24 March 2019 (Note: The Canada v French Guiana match, originally scheduled on 26 March 2019, 19:00 EDT, was rescheduled to 24 March 2019, 18:00 (15:00 UTC−7).)
18:00 (15:00 UTC−7)

Canada	4–1	French Guiana
Hoilett 12'; Cavallini 39', 50'; David 41'	Report	Rimane 26'

BC Place, Vancouver
Attendance: 17,124
Referee: Diego Montaño (Mexico)

24 March 2019
18:30

Haiti	2–1	Cuba
Nazon 26'; Lafrance 87'	Report	Paradela 61'

Stade Sylvio Cator, Port-au-Prince
Referee: Walter López (Guatemala)

24 March 2019
20:00

Barbados	0–1	Nicaragua
	Report	Barrera 65'

Wildey Astro Turf, Wildey
Referee: Reon Radix (Grenada)

== Goalscorers ==
There were 264 goals scored in 68 matches, for an average of 3.88 goals per match.

6 goals

- (Curaçao) Rangelo Janga
- (Haiti) Duckens Nazon

5 goals

- (Canada) Lucas Cavallini
- (Cuba) Luis Paradela
- (Nicaragua) Juan Barrera

4 goals

- (Antigua and Barbuda) Myles Weston
- (Bermuda) Zeiko Lewis
- (Canada) Jonathan David
- (Cuba) Yordan Santa Cruz
- (Curaçao) Gevaro Nepomuceno
- (Guyana) Emery Welshman
- (Jamaica) Cory Burke
- (Martinique) Kévin Parsemain

3 goals

- (Bermuda) Reggie Lambe
- (Canada) Junior Hoilett
- (Canada) Cyle Larin
- (Curaçao) Leandro Bacuna
- (Curaçao) Elson Hooi
- (Dominica) Julian Wade
- (Dominican Republic) Domingo Peralta
- (Grenada) A. J. Paterson
- (Guyana) Neil Danns (Note: This player's goal tally includes one or more goals which the player scored in matches that were subsequently forfeited.)
- (Guyana) Sheldon Holder
- (Jamaica) Darren Mattocks
- (Saint Kitts and Nevis) Atiba Harris
- (Saint Kitts and Nevis) Harry Panayiotou
- (Saint Lucia) Jevick Macfarlane
- (Suriname) Stefano Rijssel
- (Turks and Caicos Islands) Billy Forbes

2 goals

- (Antigua and Barbuda) Calaum Jahraldo-Martin
- (Barbados) Hallam Hope
- (Belize) Krisean Lopez
- (Bermuda) Nahki Wells
- (Bonaire) Jermaine Windster
- (Cuba) Andy Baquero
- (Cuba) Roberney Caballero
- (Cuba) Luismel Morris
- (Dominican Republic) Enmy Peña
- (El Salvador) Nelson Bonilla
- (El Salvador) Óscar Cerén
- (French Guiana) Jules Haabo
- (French Guiana) Kévin Rimane
- (Grenada) Jamal Charles
- (Guyana) Trayon Bobb
- (Haiti) Derrick Etienne Jr.
- (Haiti) Charles Hérold Jr.
- (Haiti) Soni Mustivar
- (Haiti) Frantzdy Pierrot
- (Jamaica) Ricardo Morris
- (Martinique) Mickaël Biron
- (Montserrat) Spencer Weir-Daley
- (Montserrat) Bradley Woods-Garness
- (Nicaragua) Jaime Moreno
- (Saint Kitts and Nevis) Theo Wharton
- (Saint Lucia) Pernal Williams
- (Collectivity of Saint Martin) Danilo Cocks
- (Sint Maarten) Gerwin Lake
- (Suriname) Ivenzo Comvalius
- (Suriname) Donnegy Fer

1 goal

- (Anguilla) Glenville Rogers
- (Antigua and Barbuda) Junior Benjamin
- (Antigua and Barbuda) Peter Byers
- (Antigua and Barbuda) Quinton Griffith
- (Antigua and Barbuda) Carl Osbourne
- (Aruba) Raymond Baten
- (Aruba) Ronald Gómez
- (Aruba) Josh Gross
- (Aruba) Joshua John
- (Aruba) Erik Santos de Gouveia
- (The Bahamas) Nesley Jean
- (Barbados) Mario Harte
- (Barbados) Hadan Holligan
- (Barbados) Raheim Sargeant
- (Belize) Denmark Casey Jr.
- (Belize) Elroy Kuylen
- (Belize) Deon McCaulay
- (Bermuda) Osagi Bascome
- (Bermuda) Justin Donawa
- (Bermuda) Liam Evans
- (Bermuda) Dante Leverock
- (Bermuda) Tre Ming
- (Bermuda) Lejuan Simmons
- (Bermuda) Jonte Smith
- (Bermuda) Tehvan Tyrell
- (Bonaire) Jurven Koffy
- (British Virgin Islands) Troy Caesar
- (British Virgin Islands) Jamie Wilson
- (British Virgin Islands) Jerry Wiltshire
- (Canada) Atiba Hutchinson
- (Canada) Jonathan Osorio
- (Cayman Islands) Mark Ebanks
- (Curaçao) Gervane Kastaneer
- (Curaçao) Brandley Kuwas
- (Curaçao) Ruensley Leuteria
- (Curaçao) Cuco Martina
- (Curaçao) Quenten Martinus
- (Dominica) Travist Joseph
- (Dominica) Randolph Peltier
- (Dominica) Briel Thomas
- (Dominican Republic) Tano Bonnín
- (Dominican Republic) Carlos Heredia
- (Dominican Republic) Jean Carlos López
- (Dominican Republic) Edipo Rodríguez
- (El Salvador) Gilberto Baires
- (El Salvador) Gerson Mayen
- (French Guiana) Alex Éric
- (French Guiana) Thomas Issorat
- (French Guiana) Jean-Eudes Lauristin
- (French Guiana) Warren Rino
- (French Guiana) Joffrey Torvic
- (Grenada) Antonio German
- (Grenada) Kennedy Hinkson
- (Guadeloupe) Florian David
- (Guadeloupe) Grégory Gendrey
- (Guadeloupe) Yannick Passape
- (Guyana) Kadell Daniel
- (Haiti) Carlens Arcus
- (Haiti) Mikaël Cantave
- (Haiti) Kevin Lafrance
- (Haiti) Jeff Louis
- (Jamaica) Owayne Gordon
- (Jamaica) Dane Kelly
- (Jamaica) Peter-Lee Vassell
- (Martinique) Stéphane Abaul
- (Martinique) Sébastien Crétinoir
- (Martinique) Wesley Jobello
- (Martinique) Christophe Jougon
- (Montserrat) Adrian Clifton
- (Montserrat) Joey Taylor
- (Nicaragua) Oscar López
- (Nicaragua) Henry Niño
- (Saint Kitts and Nevis) Kimaree Rogers
- (Saint Kitts and Nevis) Omari Sterling-James
- (Saint Lucia) Lester Joseph
- (Saint Lucia) Andrus Remy
- (Collectivity of Saint Martin) Akim Arrondell
- (Collectivity of Saint Martin) Wrubens Dupalus
- (Collectivity of Saint Martin) Ylaire Joachim
- (Sint Maarten) Remsley Boelijn
- (Saint Vincent and the Grenadines) Chavel Cunningham
- (Saint Vincent and the Grenadines) Nazir McBurnette
- (Saint Vincent and the Grenadines) Azinho Solomon
- (Saint Vincent and the Grenadines) Jahvin Sutherland
- (Suriname) Brian Elshot
- (Turks and Caicos Islands) Fred Dorvil
- (Turks and Caicos Islands) Jepthe Francois
- (United States Virgin Islands) Aaron Dennis
- (United States Virgin Islands) J. C. Mack
- (United States Virgin Islands) Bryce Pierre

1 own goal

- (The Bahamas) Jonathan Miller (against Belize)
- (Bonaire) Jermaine Windster (against Saint Vincent and the Grenadines)
- (Dominica) Malcolm Joseph (against Canada)
- (Jamaica) Damion Lowe (against El Salvador)
- (Collectivity of Saint Martin) Danilo Cocks (against Sint Maarten)
- (Collectivity of Saint Martin) Brice Noubon (against Saint Kitts and Nevis)
- (Sint Maarten) Diaro Forsythe (against Haiti)
- (United States Virgin Islands) Kassall Greene (against Curaçao)

== Qualified teams for CONCACAF Gold Cup ==
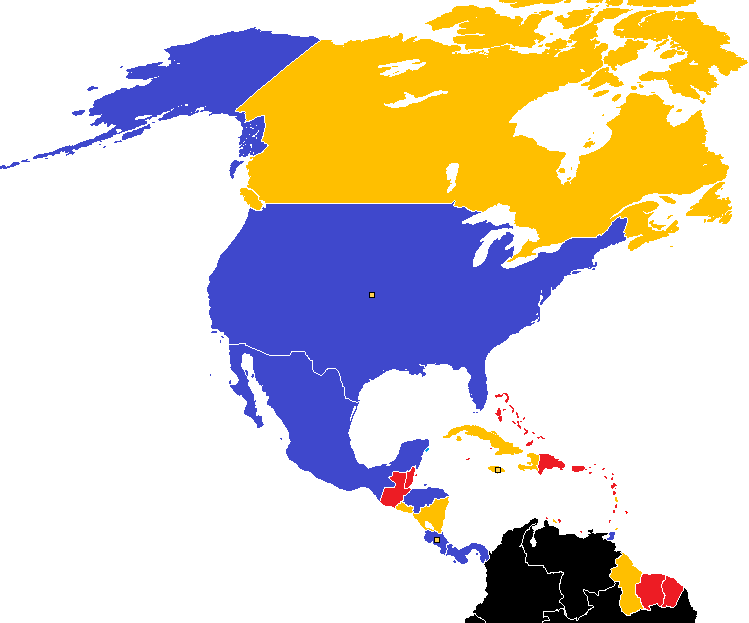
Team qualified as WCQ Hexagonal Country qualified as CNLQ Team failed to qualify

At the end of the CONCACAF Nations League qualifying, the top ten teams qualified for the 2019 CONCACAF Gold Cup together with the six participants of the 2018 FIFA World Cup qualifying Hexagonal (with their Gold Cup qualification confirmed at the draw of CONCACAF Nations League qualifying on 7 March 2018).

Team	Qualified as	Qualified on	Previous appearances in CONCACAF Gold Cup^{1} only Gold Cup era (since 1991)
Mexico	Hexagonal 1st place	7 March 2018	14 (1991, **1993**, **1996**, **1998**, 2000, 2002, **2003**, 2005, 2007, **2009**, **2011**, 2013, **2015**, 2017)
Costa Rica	Hexagonal 2nd place	7 March 2018	13 (1991, 1993, 1998, 2000, 2002, 2003, 2005, 2007, 2009, 2011, 2013, 2015, 2017)
Panama	Hexagonal 3rd place	7 March 2018	8 (1993, 2005, 2007, 2009, 2011, 2013, 2015, 2017)
Honduras	Hexagonal 4th place	7 March 2018	13 (1991, 1993, 1996, 1998, 2000, 2003, 2005, 2007, 2009, 2011, 2013, 2015, 2017)
United States	Hexagonal 5th place	7 March 2018	14 (**1991**, 1993, 1996, 1998, 2000, **2002**, 2003, **2005**, **2007**, 2009, 2011, **2013**, 2015, **2017**)
Trinidad and Tobago	Hexagonal 6th place	7 March 2018	9 (1991, 1996, 1998, 2000, 2002, 2005, 2007, 2013, 2015)
Haiti	Qualifying 1st place	24 March 2019	6 (2000, 2002, 2007, 2009, 2013, 2015)
Canada	Qualifying 2nd place	24 March 2019	13 (1991, 1993, 1996, **2000**, 2002, 2003, 2005, 2007, 2009, 2011, 2013, 2015, 2017)
Martinique	Qualifying 3rd place	23 March 2019	5 (1993, 2002, 2003, 2013, 2017)
Curaçao	Qualifying 4th place	23 March 2019	1 (2017)
Bermuda	Qualifying 5th place	24 March 2019	0 (debut)
Cuba	Qualifying 6th place	24 March 2019	8 (1998, 2002, 2003, 2005, 2007, 2011, 2013, 2015)
Guyana	Qualifying 7th place	23 March 2019	0 (debut)
Jamaica	Qualifying 8th place	23 March 2019	10 (1991, 1993, 1998, 2000, 2003, 2005, 2009, 2011, 2015, 2017)
Nicaragua	Qualifying 9th place	24 March 2019	2 (2009, 2017)
El Salvador	Qualifying 10th place	24 March 2019	10 (1996, 1998, 2002, 2003, 2007, 2009, 2011, 2013, 2015, 2017)

^{1} Bold indicates champions for that year. Italic indicates hosts for that year.
