= 2016–17 Dominica Premier League =

Dominica Premier League
- Season: 2016–17
- Champions: Dublanc
- Relegated: Wacky Rollers FC; Kensbro
- CFU Club Championship: Dublanc; Harlem United
- Biggest home win: Middleham United 9–0 Kensbro (16 Oct. 2016)
- Biggest away win: Kensboro 1–9 Wacky Rollers (21 Oct. 2016)
- Highest scoring: Bath Estate 6–5 Pointe Michel (17 Sep. 2016)
- Longest winning run: 8: Dublanc (1 Oct. 2016–14 Jan. 2017)
- Longest unbeaten run: 13: Dublanc (1 Oct. 2016–19 Feb. 2017)
- Longest winless run: 18: Kensboro (28 Aug. 2016–19 Feb. 2017)
- Longest losing run: 18: Kensboro (28 Aug. 2016–19 Feb. 2017)
- All statistics correct as of 23 May 2017.

The 2016–17 Dominica Premier League was the 52nd season of the Dominica Premier League, the top tier of association football in Dominica. The season was contested by 10 teams. It began on 28 August 2016 and concluded on 19 February 2017.

Dublanc were the league champions, winning the title on the penultimate match day of the season thanks to a 3-0 win over Kensbro. It was the club's fourth ever title and their third consecutive title.

== Teams ==
There were 10 clubs that competed during the season. All matches were played at Windsor Park in Roseau.

Team	Home city
Bath Estate	Roseau
Dublanc	Dublanc
Exodus	Roseau
Harlem United	Roseau
Kensboro	Roseau
Middleham United	Laudat
Pointe Michel	Pointe Michel
Portsmouth Bombers	Portsmouth
South East	La Plaine
Wacky Rollers	Saint Joseph

== Table ==
Pos	Team	Pld	W	D	L	GF	GA	GD	Pts	Qualification or relegation
1	Dublanc (C)	17	13	1	3	48	13	+35	40	Caribbean Club Shield (Note: The champions of the Dominica Premier League were eligible to enter the 2018 Caribbean Club Shield. However, the Dominica FA elected not to send any teams to the competition, meaning that Dublanc Estate did not participate.)
2	Harlem United	18	12	2	4	52	15	+37	38	
3	Exodus	18	11	2	5	32	19	+13	35	
4	South East	17	9	3	5	39	27	+12	30	
5	Portsmouth Bombers	16	8	1	7	32	23	+9	25	
6	Pointe Michel	17	8	1	8	34	38	−4	25	
7	Bath Estate	16	7	2	7	33	36	−3	23	
8	Middleham United	18	6	5	7	25	26	−1	23	
9	Wacky Rollers (R)	16	3	1	12	16	39	−23	10	Relegation to 2017–18 Dominican Division One
10	Kensbro (R)	18	0	0	18	6	81	−75	0	Relegation to 2017–18 Dominican Division One

Source: https://www.rsssf.org/tablesd/domi2017.html
(C) Champions;
(R) Relegated
