= 2020 Dominica Premier League =

Dominica Premier League
- Season: 2020
- Champions: South East
- CFU Club Shield: South East
- All statistics correct as of 22 December 2020.

The 2020 Dominica Premier League is the 55th season of the Dominica Premier League, the top tier of association football in Dominica. The season began on 12 January 2020. The season was suspended on 15 March due to the COVID-19 pandemic in Dominica and resumed play on 31 July. South East FC won the league title.

== Standings ==
Pos	Team	Pld	W	D	L	GF	GA	GD	Pts	Qualification or relegation
1	South East (C)	18	10	5	3	33	18	+15	35	Caribbean Club Shield
2	Bath Estate	18	10	4	4	25	14	+11	34	
3	Portsmouth Bombers	18	10	3	5	39	23	+16	33	
4	Harlem United	18	9	2	7	44	30	+14	29	
5	Dublanc	18	8	5	5	31	20	+11	29	
6	WE United	18	8	3	7	26	20	+6	27	
7	Pointe Michel	18	7	3	8	29	33	−4	24	
8	East Central	18	5	7	6	24	21	+3	22	
9	Mahaut	18	5	3	10	30	41	−11	18	Relegation playoffs
10	Exodus (R)	18	0	1	17	9	70	−61	1	Relegated to Dominica First Division

Updated to match(es) played on 22 December 2020. Source: Dominica FA
Rules for classification: 1) points; 2) goal difference; 3) number of goals scored.
(C) Champions; (R) Relegated

== Stadiums ==
Team	Location	Stadium	Capacity
South East FC	Roseau	Windsor Park (Dominica)	12,000
Bath Estate			
Portsmouth Bombers FC	Roseau	Windsor Park (Dominica)	12,000
Harlem United FC	Roseau	Windsor Park (Dominica)	12,000
Dublanc FC	Roseau	Windsor Park (Dominica)	12,000
WE United FC			
Pointe Michel FC			
East Central FC			
Mahaut FC			
Exodus FC	Roseau	Windsor Park (Dominica)	12,000
