= 2015–16 Dominica Premier League =

Dominica Premier League
- Season: 2015–16
- Champions: Dublanc Strikers
- Relegated: Aicons
- Caribbean Club Championship: Dublanc Strikers; Bath Estate
- Biggest home win: Harlem United 7–1 Aicons (5 Dec 2015)
- Biggest away win: Aicons 0–8 Bath Estate (9 Jan 2016)
- Highest scoring: 8 goals 3 occasions

The 2015–16 Dominica Premier League was the 52nd staging of the competition. The season began on 4 October 2015 and ended on 28 February 2016.

== Clubs ==
- Aicons
- Dublanc Strikers
- Exodus
- Harlem United
- Northern Bombers
- Scotia Bank Bath Estate
- Sagicor South East United
- Signman Middleham United

== Table ==
Pos	Team	Pld	W	D	L	GF	GA	GD	Pts	Qualification or relegation
1	Dublanc Strikers (C)	14	12	0	2	30	12	+18	36	2017 Caribbean Club Championship (Note: The champions and runners up of every CFU member's previous league season was eligible to enter the 2017 Caribbean Club Championship. However, the Dominica FA elected not to send any teams to the competition, meaning that Dublanc Strikers and Bath Estate did not participate.)
2	Bath Estate	14	10	2	2	41	16	+25	32	2017 Caribbean Club Championship
3	Harlem United	14	8	3	3	36	13	+23	27	
4	Exodus	14	7	4	3	32	20	+12	25	
5	Sagicor South East United	14	6	1	7	20	33	−13	19	
6	Northern Bombers	14	3	1	10	19	33	−14	10	
7	Middleham United	14	2	3	9	15	33	−18	9	
8	Aicons (R)	14	1	0	13	7	50	−43	3	Relegation to Dominica First Division

Updated to match(es) played on 4 May 2016.
Source: https://www.rsssf.org/tablesd/domi2016.html
(C) Champions;
(R) Relegated
