= Julian Wade =

Dominican footballer

Personal information
- Full name: Julian Michael Wade
- Date of birth: 12 July 1990 (age 36)
- Place of birth: Roseau, Dominica
- Height: 1.83 m (6 ft 0 in)
- Position: Striker

Team information
- Current team: Formartine United
- Number: 7

Youth career
- 2003–2008: Dominica Grammar School
- 2008–2009: Dominica State College

Senior career*
Years	Team	Apps	(Gls)
2010–2012	Ideal		
2012–2013	Bath Estate	1	(1)
2013–2014	Caledonia AIA	7	(3)
2015–2017	Slingerz FC		(7)
2017–2020	US Baie-Mahault		
2020–2021	Bath Estate		(8)
2021–2022	Brechin City	30	(13)
2022–	Formartine United	66+	(48+)

International career^{‡}
2006	Dominica U17	3	(2)
2006–2008	Dominica U20	5	(0)
2007–2008	Dominica U23	3	
2010–2011	Montserrat	4	(0)
2014–	Dominica	52	(20)
- * Club domestic league appearances and goals as of 20:19, 7 June 2026 (UTC) ‡ National team caps and goals as of 19 November 2024

Julian Wade (born 12 July 1990) is a Dominican professional footballer who plays as a striker for Scottish side Formartine United and is the all time top goalscorer for the Dominica national team.

Born in Dominica, Wade made his debut for the Montserrat national team during their qualification attempt for the Caribbean Cup in October 2010. However, after being declared ineligible to further represent Montserrat under FIFA's new eligibility rules, Wade made an international switch to represent his native Dominica. He made his debut for Los Pericos during the Windward Islands Tournament in April 2014.

== Early life ==
Wade was born in Roseau, Dominica and attended Dominica Grammar School, where he began his competitive football career. During five years playing for his Grammar School football team, Wade was named the captain and received numerous awards while playing in the Secondary Schools Football Tournament, including being named the most valuable player in four consecutive years. He later continued his education and youth career while attending Dominica State College in Roseau. Wade attributes his early interest in football to his older brother and role model Darlton Bannis.

== Club career ==
=== Early career ===
Wade began his football career in 2010, at the age of 19, with amateur club Ideal in Montserrat. After one season in the Montserrat Championship, he made a move to his native Dominica to play for Bath Estate of the Dominica Premier League where he won the league title in 2012–13. In July 2013, Wade signed with professional club Caledonia AIA of the TT Pro League in Trinidad and Tobago.

Wade spent his early football career in Montserrat where he vacationed with family members while playing for amateur club Ideal in the Montserrat Championship in 2010. During the season with Ideal, Julian had a series of impressive performances and was named the league's most valuable player for the 2010–11 season. In June 2010, Wade accepted a call-up to represent the Montserrat national team during their qualification attempt for the 2014 FIFA World Cup. Prior to their two-legged series against Belize in Couva, Trinidad and Tobago, Montserrat scheduled an exhibition match against Trinidadian club Joe Public. During the match, Wade recorded a pair goals that drew notice from Caledonia AIA manager Jamaal Shabazz in attendance.

Wade returned to his native Dominica and signed with Bath Estate of the Premier League for the 2011–12 season. On 26 February 2012, Wade scored a vital goal against Harlem United to give Bath Estate an early lead in a match to determine the league championship. However, after Harlem United scored a 75th-minute equaliser, Bath Estate finished as league runners-up following a 1–1 draw.

=== Caledonia AIA ===
On 13 July 2013, Wade traveled to Trinidad and Tobago to sign a two-year contract with Caledonia AIA of the TT Pro League. As a result, Wade became the first Dominican to sign a contract to play professional football. On 6 August, he made his debut for the Stallions of Morvant/Laventille during the group stage of the 2013–14 CONCACAF Champions League against Toluca of Liga MX. Wade came on as a second-half substitute and subsequently scored his first professional goal in the 88th minute from five yards out following an Aubrey David cross from the left-flank.

Afterwards, Wade suffered from a series of injuries that kept him out for the first half of the TT Pro League season. However, he returned on 15 November in the TOYOTA Classic to score an 88th minute equalising header from a cross to send the match against Club Sando into a penalty shootout. On 17 January 2014, Wade made his league debut for Caledonia AIA after coming on as an 82nd-minute substitute for Jamal Gay against North East Stars. On 8 April, Julian scored his first league goal for Caledonia AIA in a 5–1 defeat to Central FC in Ato Boldon Stadium. In his following match, Wade scored a further brace to give the Stallions a 3–1 win over San Juan Jabloteh. In his first professional season, Wade recorded three goals in the TT Pro League and five goals in all competitions.

In November 2015 it was confirmed that he would have a trial with Major League Soccer team Sporting Kansas City.

=== Brechin City ===
After playing in Guyana and Guadeloupe, and making a return to Bath Estate, Wade moved to Aberdeen in Scotland and signed with Highland League side Brechin City on 11 August 2021, and made his debut on the same day in the Scottish Challenge Cup against Buckie Thistle. Before signing for Brechin City, he was also on trial with Deveronvale.

In the second half of the season, Wade scored 5 goals in 4 games, including a hattrick against Nairn County. He departed the club at the end of the season, having scored 13 goals in 33 appearances.

=== Formartine United ===
In May 2022, Wade signed for another Highland League side Formartine United.

== International career ==
Wade has represented Dominica on various levels of international competition, having been capped for the under-17, under-20, under-23 Olympic team, and the Dominica national teams. Wade has also been capped for the Montserrat national team between October 2010 and June 2011.

=== Youth teams ===
He began his international career for the Dominica under-17 team during the 2006 CFU Youth Cup. During the competition, Wade made three appearances and scored a pair of goals against Bahamas on 15 August 2006. Earlier that month, Wade also received two caps for the under-20 team during its qualification attempt for the 2007 CONCACAF U-20 Championship. In September 2007, Wade participated in Los Pericos' unsuccessful qualification attempt for the 2008 Summer Olympics in Beijing. However, in their final group stage match, Julian recorded a brace to give the under-23 team a 2–1 win over Saint Lucia.

In July 2008, Wade made an additional three appearances for the under-20 team in another early exit from qualification for a continental tournament following a draw to Suriname and consecutive losses to Aruba and Saint Kitts and Nevis.

=== Senior teams ===
Although he had previously represented his native Dominica as a youth, Wade accepted a call-up to the Montserrat national team while he was playing for Ideal in the Montserrat Championship in 2010. Later that year, Wade made his full international debut for Montserrat on 6 October 2010, at the age of 20, against Saint Vincent and the Grenadines during its qualification attempt for the 2010 Caribbean Cup. He made a further two appearances for the Emerald Boys in losses to Barbados and Saint Kitts and Nevis, which witnessed Montserrat eliminated from the competition without scoring a goal.

Julian received his fourth cap for Montserrat after making an appearance in the team's first leg loss to Belize during 2014 FIFA World Cup qualification in June 2011. However, Wade was declared ineligible by FIFA to further represent Montserrat under the governing body's new eligibility rules. As a result, Wade decided to make an international switch back to his native Dominica in September 2012.

In April 2014, Wade made his debut for the Dominica national team during the 2014 Windward Islands Tournament held in Roseau. In his third consecutive start as striker, Wade scored his first two international goals in a 5–3 loss to Grenada on 4 May 2014.

== Career statistics ==
=== Club ===
As of 5 June 2022

Club	Season	League			Cup		League Cup (Note: Includes appearances in the Trinidad and Tobago's Classic, Goal Shield, and Pro Bowl)		Continental (Note: Includes appearances in the CONCACAF Champions League)		Other (Note: Includes appearances in the Trinidad and Tobago Charity Shield and CFU Club Championship)		Total	
Club	Season	Division	Apps	Goals	Apps	Goals	Apps	Goals	Apps	Goals	Apps	Goals	Apps	Goals
Ideal	2010–11	Montserrat Championship	0	0	0	0	0	0	0	0	0	0	0	0
Ideal	Total		0	0	0	0	0	0	0	0	0	0	0	0
Bath Estate	2011–12	Premier League	1	1	0	0	0	0	0	0	0	0	1	1
Bath Estate	2012–13	Premier League	0	0	0	0	0	0	0	0	0	0	0	0
Bath Estate	Total		1	1	0	0	0	0	0	0	0	0	1	1
Caledonia AIA	2013–14	TT Pro League	7	3	0	0	2	1	1	1	0	0	10	5
Caledonia AIA	Total		7	3	0	0	2	1	1	1	0	0	10	5
Brechin City	2021–22	Breedon Highland League	31	13	0	0	0	0	0	0	0	0	31	13
Brechin City	Total		31	13	0	0	0	0	0	0	0	0	31	13
Formartine United	2022–23	Breedon Highland League	0	0	0	0	0	0	0	0	0	0	0	0
Formartine United	Total		0	0	0	0	0	0	0	0	0	0	0	0
Career total			39	17	0	0	2	1	1	1	0	0	42	19

=== International ===
As of match played 19 November 2024

==== International appearances ====
National team	Year	Friendly		Competitive		Total	
National team	Year	Apps	Goals	Apps	Goals	Apps	Goals
Montserrat	2010	0	0	3	0	3	0
Montserrat	2011	0	0	1	0	1	0
Total		0	0	4	0	4	0
Dominica	2014	3	2	3	1	6	3
Dominica	2015	4	1	4	0	8	1
Dominica	2016	0	0	4	4	4	4
Dominica	2017	5	5	0	0	5	5
Dominica	2018	0	0	3	1	3	1
Dominica	2019	4	0	7	3	11	3
Dominica	2020	0	0	0	0	0	0
Dominica	2021	0	0	4	2	4	2
Dominica	2022	0	0	3	1	3	1
Dominica	2023	0	0	2	0	2	0
Dominica	2024	0	0	6	0	6	0
Total		16	8	36	12	52	20

==== International goals ====
Scores and results list Dominica's goal tally first.

No.	Date	Venue	Cap	Opponent	Score	Result	Competition
1.	4 May 2014	Windsor Park, Roseau, Dominica	3	Grenada	1–0	3–5	2014 Windward Islands Tournament
2.	4 May 2014	Windsor Park, Roseau, Dominica	3	Grenada	3–1	3–5	2014 Windward Islands Tournament
3.	7 September 2014	Warner Park Sporting Complex, Basseterre, Saint Kitts and Nevis	6	Saint Lucia	1–1	1–2	2014 Caribbean Cup qualification
4.	14 May 2015	Philip Marcellin Grounds, Vieux Fort, Saint Lucia	11	Grenada	1–1	2–1	Friendly
5.	26 March 2016	A. O. Shirley Recreation Ground, Road Town, British Virgin Islands	15	British Virgin Islands	1–0	7–0	2017 Caribbean Cup qualification
6.	26 March 2016	A. O. Shirley Recreation Ground, Road Town, British Virgin Islands	15	British Virgin Islands	6–0	7–0	2017 Caribbean Cup qualification
7.	26 March 2016	A. O. Shirley Recreation Ground, Road Town, British Virgin Islands	15	British Virgin Islands	7–0	7–0	2017 Caribbean Cup qualification
8.	4 June 2016	Stade René Serge Nabajoth, Les Abymes, Guadeloupe	17	Guadeloupe	1–1	1–2	2017 Caribbean Cup qualification
9.	17 May 2017	Stade René Serge Nabajoth, Les Abymes, Guadeloupe	19	Guadeloupe	1–1	2–2	Friendly
10.	17 May 2017	Stade René Serge Nabajoth, Les Abymes, Guadeloupe	19	Guadeloupe	2–1	2–2	Friendly
11.	28 June 2017	Kirani James Athletic Stadium, St. George's, Grenada	20	Grenada	1–0	1–1	2017 Windward Islands Tournament
12.	30 June 2017	Fond Playing Field, Sauteurs, Grenada	21	Barbados	1–0	2–1	2017 Windward Islands Tournament
13.	6 July 2017	Kirani James Athletic Stadium, St. George's, Grenada	23	Saint Vincent and the Grenadines	1–0	2–2	2017 Windward Islands Tournament
14.	20 November 2018	Raymond E. Guishard Technical Centre, The Valley, Anguilla	26	Sint Maarten	1–0	2–0	2019–20 CONCACAF Nations League qualification
15.	23 March 2019	Windsor Park, Roseau, Dominica	31	Bahamas	1–0	4–0	2019–20 CONCACAF Nations League qualification
16.	23 March 2019	Windsor Park, Roseau, Dominica	31	Bahamas	3–0	4–0	2019–20 CONCACAF Nations League qualification
17.	11 October 2019	Nicaragua National Football Stadium, Managua, Nicaragua	34	Nicaragua	1–3	1–3	2019–20 CONCACAF Nations League B
18.	2 June 2021	Félix Sánchez Olympic Stadium, Santo Domingo, Dominican Republic	40	Anguilla	3–0	3–0	2022 FIFA World Cup qualification
19.	8 June 2021	Félix Sánchez Olympic Stadium, Santo Domingo, Dominican Republic	41	Barbados	1–1	1–1	2022 FIFA World Cup qualification
20.	5 June 2022	Warner Park, Basseterre, Saint Kitts and Nevis	43	Anguilla	1–0	1–1	2022–23 CONCACAF Nations League C

== Honours ==
Bath Road Ambassadors

- Dominica All Island League: 2006–07
- Dominica Division One League: 2007–08

Bath Estate

- Dominica Premier League: 2012–13

Individual

- Most Goals Stag Elite League: 2015–16 Guyana Elite League
- Most Valuable Player: 2010–11 Montserrat Championship
- Most Outstanding Striker: 2007–08 Dominica Division One League
- Most Goals: 2006–07 Dominica Division One League
- Most Valuable Player: 2005–06 Dominica Division One League
- Most Outstanding Striker: 2004–05 Dominica All Island League
- Most Improved Player: 2004–05 Dominica Football Association
- Rookie of the year: 2004–05 Dominica Football Association
