= Audel Laville =

Dominica footballer

Personal information
- Full name: Audel Josiah O'Neal Laville
- Date of birth: 14 September 2002 (age 24)
- Place of birth: Mahaut, Dominica
- Height: 1.78 m (5 ft 10 in)
- Position: Striker

Team information
- Current team: Dublanc

Senior career*
Years	Team	Apps	(Gls)
2017–2023	Harlem United		(9)
2023–	Dublanc		(64)

International career^{‡}
2023–	Dominica	30	(11)
- * Club domestic league appearances and goals ‡ National team caps and goals as of 22:47, 4 June 2025 (UTC)

Audel Laville (born 14 September 2002) is a Dominican footballer who currently plays for Dublanc and the Dominica national team.

== Club career ==
Laville is a product of the Newtown Juvenile Football Academy in his hometown of Mahaut. His coaches, including former national team manager Don Leogal, recognized him as a special talent from an early age. He also played football for his school teams, including Convent Preparatory School at the under-13 level and Saint Mary's Academy at the U13, U15, and U17 levels. His teams won the under-15 and under-17 league championships.

At age fifteen, Laville joined Dominica Premier League club Harlem United. He was a central figure in Harlem's Dominica Football Association U20 Championship win in 2019 and First Division championships in 2019 and 2020. In 2020, he helped secure the championship with two goals in a come-from-behind victory over East Central FC. Later that year, he was named the DFA Youth Player of the Year and his club's Footballer of the Year for his efforts. That year, Harlem United also won the Knockout Recovery Cup with a victory over Bath Estate. Laville scored in the finals and was named Man of the Match. In the finals of the 2022 President's Cup, Laville scored a hat-trick in a 7–1 victory over Glanvillia Renegades to win the championship.

Laville began the 2023 season with Harlem United, scoring a brace against Pointe Michel FC and was named man of the match on the third matchday. By June of that year, he had moved to Dublanc FC. He scored another brace against Pointe Michel FC en route to earning more Man of the Match honours.

== International career ==
Laville represented Dominica at the youth level in the 2017 CONCACAF Boys' Under-15 Championship. He scored a goal in a friendly against Barbados in preparation for the tournament. He then captained his side in 2020 CONCACAF U-20 Championship qualifying. He scored two goals in a 4–1 victory over Anguilla in the tournament.

Laville made his senior international debut on 20 November 2018 in a 2019–20 CONCACAF Nations League qualifying match against Sint Maarten. At age seventeen, Laville scored against Saint Vincent and the Grenadines after coming on as a substitute in the 2019–20 CONCACAF Nations League B. With the goal, he became the youngest-ever player to score in the CONCACAF Nations League. The goal was Laville's first at the senior international level and secured the first-ever win for Dominica in the Nations League proper. After the match, Dominica head coach Rajesh Latchoo called Laville the future of Dominica football. On 20 November 2023, he scored a goal in a victory over the British Virgin Islands in the 2023–24 CONCACAF Nations League C. With the win, Dominica secured promotion to the League B for the 2024–25 edition of the tournament.

=== International goals ===
Scores and results list the Dominica's goal tally first.

No.	Date	Venue	Opponent	Score	Result	Competition
1.	18 November 2019	Windsor Park, Roseau, Dominica	Saint Vincent and the Grenadines	1–0	1–0	2019–20 CONCACAF Nations League B
2.	28 March 2021	Félix Sánchez Olympic Stadium, Santo Domingo, Dominican Republic	Panama	1–1	1–2	2022 FIFA World Cup qualification
3.	15 May 2022	Windsor Park, Roseau, Dominica	Saint Vincent and the Grenadines	1–0	3–1	Friendly
4.	15 May 2022	Windsor Park, Roseau, Dominica	Saint Vincent and the Grenadines	2–1	3–1	Friendly
5.	16 November 2023	A. O. Shirley Recreation Ground, Road Town, British Virgin Islands	British Virgin Islands	1–0	2–1	2023–24 CONCACAF Nations League C
6.	20 November 2023	A. O. Shirley Recreation Ground, Road Town, British Virgin Islands	Turks and Caicos Islands	1–0	2–0	2023–24 CONCACAF Nations League C
7.	2 May 2024	Victoria Park, Kingstown, Saint Vincent and the Grenadines	Saint Vincent and the Grenadines	2–1	3–1	Friendly
8.	2 May 2024	Victoria Park, Kingstown, Saint Vincent and the Grenadines	Saint Vincent and the Grenadines	3–1	3–1	Friendly
9.	15 October 2024	Bermuda National Stadium, Devonshire Parish, Bermuda	Bermuda	2–3	2–3	2024–25 CONCACAF Nations League B
10.	4 June 2025	Windsor Park, Roseau, Dominica	British Virgin Islands	1–0	3–0	2026 FIFA World Cup qualification
11.	4 June 2025	Windsor Park, Roseau, Dominica	British Virgin Islands	3–0	3–0	2026 FIFA World Cup qualification
Last updated 4 June 2025

=== International career statistics ===
As of match played 4 June 2025.

Dominica national team
2018	1	0
2019	4	1
2020	0	0
2021	4	1
2022	4	2
2023	5	2
2024	10	3
2025	2	2
Total	30	11
