= List of football clubs in Dominica =

This is a list of football clubs in Dominica.

- Roseau soft boys
- Bomers
- Glanvilla FC
- Centre Bath Estate FC
- Dublanc FC
- Harlem United FC
- LIME Pointe Michel FC
- Nagico Bombers
- Quick Zone Icons
- Sagicor South East United
- Starrin and Sons St Joseph FC
