= 2018–19 Dominica Premier League =

Dominica Premier League
- Season: 2018–19
- Champions: South East
- Relegated: Wacky Rollers

The 2018–19 Dominica Premier League is the 54th season of the Dominica Premier League, the top division football competition in Dominica. The season began on 18 August 2018.

== League table ==
Pos	Team	Pld	W	D	L	GF	GA	GD	Pts	Qualification or relegation
1	South East (C)	18	13	2	3	55	18	+37	41	Caribbean Club Shield
2	Dublanc	18	12	3	3	44	16	+28	39	
3	Portsmouth Bombers	18	12	2	4	49	20	+29	38	
4	Harlem United	18	9	5	4	44	28	+16	32	
5	Pointe Michel	18	9	1	8	36	41	−5	28	
6	Bath Estate	17	8	3	6	33	21	+12	27	
7	Soca Strikers	18	6	2	10	21	36	−15	20	
8	Exodus	18	4	3	11	18	43	−25	15	
9	Middleham United (Q)	18	3	2	13	21	45	−24	11	Relegation playoffs
10	Wacky Rollers (R)	17	1	1	15	14	67	−53	4	Relegated to Dominica First Division

Updated to match(es) played on 4 May 2019. Source: Dominica Football Association
(C) Champions; (Q) Qualified for the phase indicated; (R) Relegated
