= Dominica women's national football team =

Women's national association football team representing Dominica

Dominica
- Association: Dominica Football Association
- Confederation: CONCACAF
- Head coach: Rosilia Registe
- FIFA code: DMA
First colours	Second colours

FIFA ranking
- Current: 170 ▼2 (21 April 2026)
- Highest: 82 (July 2003)
- Lowest: 168 (December 2025)

First international
- Saint Vincent and the Grenadines 5–0 Dominica (30 April 2000)

Biggest win
- Dominica 8–1 Turks and Caicos Islands (Roseau, Dominica; 6 April 2022)

Biggest defeat
- Dominica 0–18 Jamaica (Gros Islet, Saint Lucia; 29 November 2025)

The Dominica women's national football team is the national women's football team of Dominica and is overseen by the Dominica Football Association.

== Results and fixtures ==
The following is a list of match results in the last 12 months, as well as any future matches that have been scheduled.

Legend

Win Draw Lose Fixture

=== 2025 ===
29 November 2025 2026 CONCACAF W Championship Q	Dominica	0–18	Jamaica	Gros Islet (Saint Lucia)
15:00 UTC−4		Report (FIFA); Report (CONCACAF)	Plummer 2'; Shaw 4', 39', 43'; van Zanten 7', 21'; Brown 9', 35', 82'; Primus 11'; Paul 26' (o.g.); Blackwood 51', 89'; Buckley 80', 90+2'; Thomas 86', 88'; Hayles 90+1'	Stadium: Daren Sammy Cricket Ground; Referee: Astrid Azucena Gramajo Ramirez (Guatemala)

== Coaching staff ==
updated as 13/12/2025

Role	Name
Head coach	Ronnie Gustave
Assistant coach	Sheldon Casimir
Assistant coach	Melvin Angol
Fitness coach	Duly Polydore
Manager	(Dominica) Regina Walsh
Medic	Rose Annette Peltier-Lugay
Equipment manager	Steve Samuel
Media officer	Sheena Harry

== Players ==
=== Current squad ===
- The following players were named to the squad to play the 2026 CONCACAF W Championship qualification match against Jamaica on 29 November 2025.

No.	Pos.	Player	Date of birth (age)	Caps	Goals	Club
	GK	Dymond Daniel	31 December 2007 (age 18)			(Dominica Football Association) Harlem United FC
	GK	Jewel Harve	9 March 2003 (age 23)			(Antigua and Barbuda Football Association)
	GK	Gaylisha Lockhart	13 January 2009 (age 17)			(Dominica Football Association)
	DF	Sagirah St. Rose	21 March 2007 (age 19)			(Dominica Football Association) Mahaut Soca Strikers FC
	DF	Jahrishsa Paul				
	DF	Breanelle Laurent				
	DF	Lean Laurent				
	DF	Kimra Joseph	28 February 1996 (age 30)			(Dominica Football Association) Harlem United FC
	DF	Jessica Pierre-Louis	8 October 2003 (age 22)			(Dominica Football Association) Bombers FC
	DF	Trinity Esprit				
	DF	Whitney Charles				
	DF	Daniella Laurent	16 May 2003 (age 23)			(Dominica Football Association) WE United FC
	MF	Timecia Pierre-Louis	24 October 2008 (age 17)			
	MF	Rosalinda Paul	22 January 2004 (age 22)			(Dominica Football Association) Dublanc FC
	MF	Kenisha Jno. Lewis	4 January 2007 (age 19)			(Dominica Football Association) Harlem United FC
	MF	Alianne George	16 August 2005 (age 20)			(United States Soccer Federation) EOS Mountaineers
	MF	Chloe Louise Lecointe	20 March 2008 (age 18)			(Dominica Football Association)
	MF	Eden Rayne Lander	8 October 2007 (age 18)			(Dominica Football Association)
	MF	Kimara Felix	29 July 2006 (age 19)			(Dominica Football Association)
	MF	Nyomie Defoe	5 November 2001 (age 24)			(Dominica Football Association)
	FW	Britney Dennis	4 August 2003 (age 22)			(Dominica Football Association) Mahaut Soca Strikers FC
	FW	Starr Humphreys	22 July 2004 (age 21)			(United States Soccer Federation) Blinn Buccaneers
	FW	Le-Myah Forde	26 March 2008 (age 18)			(Dominica Football Association) Bombers FC

=== Recent call ups ===
Pos.	Player	Date of birth (age)	Caps	Goals	Club	Latest call-up

== Competitive record ==
=== FIFA Women's World Cup ===
FIFA Women's World Cup record
Year	Result	GP	W	D*	L	GF	GA
(China) 1991	Did not enter						
(Sweden) 1995	Did not enter						
(United States) 1999	Did not enter						
(United States) 2003	Did not qualify						
(China) 2007	Did not qualify						
(Germany) 2011	Did not qualify						
(Canada) 2015	Did not qualify						
(France) 2019	Did not qualify						
(Australia) (New Zealand) 2023	Did not qualify						
(Brazil) 2027	Did not qualify						
(Costa Rica) (Jamaica) (Mexico) (United States) 2031	To be determined						
(United Kingdom) 2035	To be determined						
Total	0/10	-	-	-	-	-	-

*Draws include knockout matches decided on penalty kicks.

=== Olympic Games ===
Summer Olympics record									Qualifying record					
Year	Round	Position	Pld	W	D*	L	GF	GA	Pld	W	D*	L	GF	GA
(United States) 1996 to (Australia) 2000	Did not enter								Did not enter					
(Greece) 2004	Withdrew								Withdrew					
(China) 2008	Did not qualify								3	0	0	3	0	19
(United Kingdom) 2012	Did not qualify								3	0	0	3	1	22
(Brazil) 2016	Did not qualify								2	0	0	2	0	23
(Japan) 2020	Withdrew								Withdrew					
(France) 2024	Did not qualify								2022 CONCACAF W Championship					
(United States) 2028	Did not qualify								2026 CONCACAF W Championship					
Total	–	–	–	–	–	–	–	–	8	0	0	8	1	64

*Draws include knockout matches decided on penalty kicks.

=== CONCACAF W Championship record ===
CONCACAF W Championship record								Qualification record					
Year	Result	GP	W	D*	L	GF	GA	GP	W	D*	L	GF	GA
(Haiti) 1991	Did not enter							Did not enter					
(United States) 1993	Did not enter							Did not enter					
(Canada) 1994	Did not enter							Did not enter					
(Canada) 1998	Did not enter							Did not enter					
(United States) 2000	Did not enter							Did not enter					
(United States) (Canada) 2002	Did not qualify							2	0	0	2	0	22
(United States) 2006	Did not qualify							3	0	1	2	2	10
(Mexico) 2010	Did not qualify							2	0	0	2	0	8
(United States) 2014	Did not qualify							2014 Caribbean Cup					
(United States) 2018	Did not qualify							4	1	1	2	5	6
(Mexico) 2022	Did not qualify							4	1	0	3	8	17
(United States) 2026	Did not qualify							4	0	1	3	1	36
Total	0/12	-	-	-	-	-	-	19	2	3	14	16	99

*Draws include knockout matches decided on penalty kicks.

=== CONCACAF W Gold Cup ===
CONCACAF W Gold Cup record								Qualification record							
Year	Result	GP	W	D*	L	GF	GA	Division	Group	GP	W	D*	L	GF	GA
(United States) 2024	Did not qualify							B	A	6	1	1	4	2	30
(N/A) 2029	To be determined							To be determined							
Total	–	–	–	–	–	–	–	–	–	6	1	1	4	2	30

*Draws include knockout matches decided on penalty kicks.

=== CFU Women's Caribbean Cup ===
CFU Women's Caribbean Cup record
Year	Result	Pld	W	D*	L	GF	GA
(Haiti) 2000	Preliminary	2	0	0	2	0	9
(Trinidad and Tobago) 2014	Withdrew						
(Saint Kitts and Nevis) 2018	N/A	3	1	1	1	3	1
Total	–	5	1	1	3	3	10

*Draws include knockout matches decided on penalty kicks.

== See also ==
- Dominica national football team (Men)
