= 2024 CFU Club Shield =

Football tournament

Tournament details
- Host country: Curaçao
- Dates: 25 July – 4 August
- Teams: 20 (from 20 associations)

Final positions
- Champions: (Jamaica) Arnett Gardens (1st title)
- Runners-up: (Antigua and Barbuda) Grenades
- Third place: (Dominican Republic) Atlético Pantoja
- Fourth place: (Dominica) Dublanc

Tournament statistics
- Matches played: 20
- Goals scored: 55 (2.75 per match)
- Top scorer(s): (Dominica) Travist Joseph (Jamaica) Fabian Reid (4 goals each)

The 2024 CFU Club Shield was the seventh edition of the CFU Club Shield, the second-tier annual international club football competition in the Caribbean region, held amongst the clubs affiliated with the Caribbean Football Union (CFU), a sub-confederation of CONCACAF. The tournament was played in Curaçao between 25 July – 4 August 2024.

This iteration of the CFU Club Shield transitioned to the CFU for management and organization.

Arnett Gardens won their first title, defeating Grenades in the final. Both finalists qualified to the 2024 CONCACAF Caribbean Cup.

== Teams ==
Among the 31 CFU member associations, 20 of them are classified and each may enter one team in the CONCACAF Caribbean Shield.

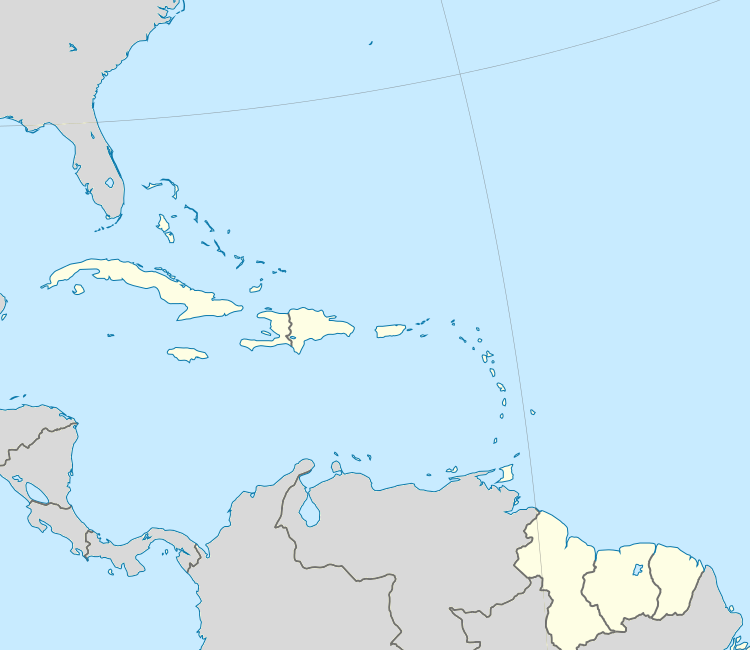
Location of teams of the 2023 CONCACAF Caribbean Shield
(H): Hosts
Preliminary Round; Round of 16

Association	Team	Qualification method	App. (last)	Previous best (last)
Antigua and Barbuda	Grenades	2022–23 Antigua and Barbuda Premier Division champions	1st	Debut
Aruba	Racing Club Aruba	2022–23 Aruban Division di Honor champions	3rd (2021)	Group stage (2021)
Bonaire	Real Rincon	2022–23 Bonaire League champions	6th (2022)	Third place (2018)
Cayman Islands	Scholars International	2022–23 Cayman Islands Premier League champions	5th (2023)	Consolation matches (2019)
Curaçao (H)	Jong Holland	2022–23 Curaçao Promé Divishon champions	4th (2023)	Third place (2019)
Dominica	Dublanc	2023 Dominica Premier League champions	1st	Debut
Dominican Republic	Atlético Pantoja	2024 Liga Dominicana de Fútbol Caribbean competition play-off winner	1st	Debut
French Guiana	Étoile Matoury	2022–23 French Guiana Régional 1 champions	2nd (2023)	Group stage (2023)
Grenada	Paradise FC International	2023–24 GFA Premier League champions	1st	Debut
Guyana	Guyana Defence Force	2023 GFF Elite League champions	2nd (2018)	Group stage (2018)
Haiti	América des Cayes	2024 D1 Special Championship third place	1st	Debut
Jamaica	Arnett Gardens	2023–24 Jamaica Premier League third place	1st	Debut
Puerto Rico	Metropolitan	2022–23 Liga Puerto Rico Clausura champions	4th (2023)	Fourth place (2023)
Saint Kitts and Nevis	Village Superstars	2023 SKNFA Premier League champions	2nd (2019)	Quarter-finals (2019)
Saint Lucia	BAYS FC	2023 SLFA First Division champions	1st	Debut
Saint Martin	Junior Stars	2022–23 Saint-Martin Senior League champions	3rd (2023)	Group stage (2023)
Sint Maarten	SCSA Eagles	2022–23 Sint Maarten Premier League champions	1st	Debut
Suriname	Robinhood	2023 SVB Eerste Divisie champions	3rd (2023)	Champions (2023)
Trinidad and Tobago	Defence Force	2023–24 TT Premier Football League third place	1st	Debut
Turks and Caicos Islands	SWA Sharks	2022–23 Provo Premier League champions	3rd (2023)	Group stage (2023)

(H): Hosts

Notes

1. Dominican Republic (DOM): A play-off match was held between Atlético Pantoja and Atlántico FC to determine the Club Shield participant as both teams finished equal on points in the aggregate table of the 2023 season.

== Schedule ==
The schedule of the competition was as follows

Round	Dates
Preliminary round	25–26 July
Round of 16	27–28 July
Quarter-finals	30 July
Semi-finals	2 August
Third place	4 August
Final	4 August

== Bracket ==
Preliminary round
(Turks and Caicos Islands) SWA Sharks	1
(Grenada) Paradise FC International	0
(Saint Lucia) BAYS FC	1
(Sint Maarten) SCSA Eagles	0
(Antigua and Barbuda) Grenades	6
Guyana Defence Force	2
(Collectivity of Saint Martin) Junior Stars	0
(Dominica) Dublanc	2

Round of 16
(Puerto Rico) Metropolitan	2
(Turks and Caicos Islands) SWA Sharks	0
(Dominican Republic) Atlético Pantoja	1
(Trinidad and Tobago) Defence Force	0
Racing Club Aruba	1
(Jamaica) Arnett Gardens	2
(Curaçao) Jong Holland	3
(Saint Lucia) BAYS FC	0
(Bonaire) Real Rincon	1
(Antigua and Barbuda) Grenades	2
(Suriname) Robinhood	4
(French Guiana) Étoile Matoury	1
(Haiti) ~~América des Cayes~~
(Saint Kitts and Nevis) Village Superstars	w/o
(Cayman Islands) Scholars International	0
(Dominica) Dublanc	3

Quarter-finals
(Puerto Rico) Metropolitan	0
(Dominican Republic) Atlético Pantoja	1
(Jamaica) Arnett Gardens	7
(Curaçao) Jong Holland	1
(Antigua and Barbuda) Grenades	2
(Suriname) Robinhood	1
(Saint Kitts and Nevis) Village Superstars	2 (3)
(Dominica) Dublanc (p)	2 (5)

Semi-finals
(Dominican Republic) Atlético Pantoja	1
(Jamaica) Arnett Gardens	2
(Antigua and Barbuda) Grenades	1
(Dominica) Dublanc	0

Final
(Jamaica) Arnett Gardens	1
(Antigua and Barbuda) Grenades	0
Third place
(Dominican Republic) Atlético Pantoja (p)	1 (9)
(Dominica) Dublanc	1 (8)

== Matches ==
All match times are in AST (UTC−4).

=== Preliminary round ===
25 July 2024
17:30

SWA Sharks (Turks and Caicos Islands)	1–0	(Grenada) Paradise FC International
Forbes 42'	Report

Stadion Rignaal 'Jean' Francisca, Willemstad

25 July 2024
20:00

BAYS FC (Saint Lucia)	1–0	(Sint Maarten) SCSA Eagles
Longville 79'	Report

Stadion Rignaal 'Jean' Francisca, Willemstad

26 July 2024
17:30

Grenades (Antigua and Barbuda)	6–2	Guyana Defence Force
Augustin 35'; Blake 65'; Stewart 71'; Labrada 74'; Henry 78'; Massicot 90+5'	Report	Benjamin 20' (pen.); Scott 82'

Stadion Rignaal 'Jean' Francisca, Willemstad

26 July 2024
20:00

Junior Stars (Collectivity of Saint Martin)	0–2	(Dominica) Dublanc
	Report	Joseph 42'; Laville 90+1'

Stadion Rignaal 'Jean' Francisca, Willemstad

=== Round of 16 ===
27 July 2024
17:30

Metropolitan (Puerto Rico)	2–0	(Turks and Caicos Islands) SWA Sharks
Maroni 17'; Amarilla 67'	Report

Stadion Rignaal 'Jean' Francisca, Willemstad

27 July 2024
17:30

Atlético Pantoja (Dominican Republic)	1–0	(Trinidad and Tobago) Defence Force
Espinal 77'	Report

Ergilio Hato Stadium, Willemstad

27 July 2024
20:00

Racing Club Aruba	1–2	(Jamaica) Arnett Gardens
Silva 2'	Report	Brown 45+1'; Thompson 90'

Stadion Rignaal 'Jean' Francisca, Willemstad

27 July 2024
20:00

Jong Holland (Curaçao)	3–0	(Saint Lucia) BAYS FC
Rosa 11', 45'; Roosje 79'	Report

Ergilio Hato Stadium, Willemstad

28 July 2024
17:30

Real Rincon (Bonaire)	1–2	(Antigua and Barbuda) Grenades
Cicilia 78'	Report	Stewart 42'; Labrada 64'

Stadion Rignaal 'Jean' Francisca, Willemstad

28 July 2024
17:30

Robinhood (Suriname)	4–1	(French Guiana) Étoile Matoury
Tuur 24'; Rigters 34' (pen.), 90+2'; Cairo 54'	Report	Gordon 19'

Ergilio Hato Stadium, Willemstad

28 July 2024
20:00

América des Cayes (Haiti)	w/o (Note: Match was cancelled due to absence of América des Cayes, Village Superstars advanced to quarter-finals)	(Saint Kitts and Nevis) Village Superstars
	Report

Stadion Rignaal 'Jean' Francisca, Willemstad

28 July 2024
20:00

Scholars International (Cayman Islands)	0–3	(Dominica) Dublanc
	Report	Bertrand 13'; Laville 30'; Thomas 75'

Ergilio Hato Stadium, Willemstad

=== Quarter-finals ===
30 July 2024
17:30

Metropolitan (Puerto Rico)	0–1	(Dominican Republic) Atlético Pantoja
	Report	Baez 5'

Stadion Rignaal 'Jean' Francisca, Willemstad
Referee: Shavin Green (Guyana)

30 July 2024
17:30

Arnett Gardens (Jamaica)	7–1	(Curaçao) Jong Holland
Reid 5', 45+4', 60'; Thomas 9'; Kelson 70'; Arbouine 82'; Thompson 90'	Report	Roosje 59'

Ergilio Hato Stadium, Willemstad
Referee: Jose Torres (Puerto-Rico)

30 July 2024
20:00

Grenades (Antigua and Barbuda)	2–1	(Suriname) Robinhood
Stewart 34'; Britto 58'	Report	Tuur 32'

Stadion Rignaal 'Jean' Francisca, Willemstad
Referee: Reon Radix (Grenada)

30 July 2024
20:00

Village Superstars (Saint Kitts and Nevis)	2–2	(Dominica) Dublanc
Amory 34'; Sabaroche 90+2' (o.g.)	Report	Joseph 10', 11'
Penalties
	3–5

Ergilio Hato Stadium, Willemstad
Referee: Carl-Henry Elie (Haiti)

=== Semi-finals ===
2 August 2024
17:30

Atlético Pantoja (Dominican Republic)	1–2	(Jamaica) Arnett Gardens
Rosado 23' (pen.)	Report	Brown 18'; Reid 90+4'

Stadion Rignaal 'Jean' Francisca, Willemstad
Referee: Moeth Gaymes (St Vincent & Grenadines)

2 August 2024
20:00

Grenades (Antigua and Barbuda)	1–0	(Dominica) Dublanc
Augustin 84'	Report

Stadion Rignaal 'Jean' Francisca, Willemstad
Referee: José Corporan (Dominican Republic)

=== Third place match ===
4 August 2024
17:30

Atlético Pantoja (Dominican Republic)	1–1	(Dominica) Dublanc
Rosado 82'	Report	Joseph 5' (pen.)
Penalties
	9–8

Stadion Rignaal 'Jean' Francisca, Willemstad
Referee: Timothy Derry (Trinidad & Tobago)

=== Final ===
4 August 2024
20:00

Arnett Gardens (Jamaica)	1–0	(Antigua and Barbuda) Grenades
Thompson 73'	Report

Stadion Rignaal 'Jean' Francisca, Willemstad
Referee: Reon Radix (Grenada)

== Goalscorers ==
Team eliminated for this round.
Team inactive for this round.

Rank	Player	Team	PR	R16	QF	SF	3rd	F	Total
1	(Dominica) Travist Joseph	(Dominica) Dublanc	1		2		1		4
1	(Jamaica) Fabian Reid	(Jamaica) Arnett Gardens			3	1			4
3	(Jamaica) Rushane Thompson	(Jamaica) Arnett Gardens		1	1			1	3
3	(Saint Vincent and the Grenadines) Malcolm Stewart	(Antigua and Barbuda) Grenades	1	1	1				3
5	(Saint Lucia) Sherman Augustin	(Antigua and Barbuda) Grenades	1			1			2
5	(Jamaica) Keneldo Brown	(Jamaica) Arnett Gardens		1		1			2
5	(Antigua and Barbuda) Luis Labrada	(Antigua and Barbuda) Grenades	1	1					2
5	(Dominica) Audel Laville	(Dominica) Dublanc	1	1					2
5	(Curaçao) Davidson Rosa	(Curaçao) Jong Holland		2					2
5	(Dominican Republic) Robert Rosado	(Dominican Republic) Atlético Pantoja				1	1		2
5	(Suriname) Jamilhio Rigters	(Suriname) Robinhood		2					2
5	(Curaçao) Shurwendel Roosje	(Curaçao) Jong Holland		1	1				2
5	(Suriname) Don Tuur	(Suriname) Robinhood		1	1				2

== See also ==
- 2024 Leagues Cup
- 2024 CONCACAF Central American Cup
- 2024 CONCACAF Caribbean Cup
- 2025 CONCACAF Champions Cup
