= Dublanc Playing Field =

Sports venue in Dublanc, Dominica

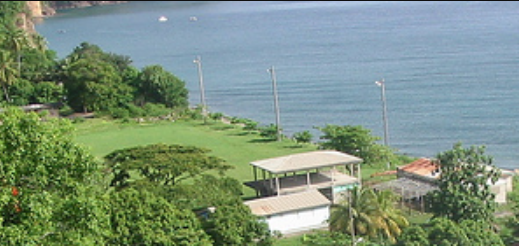
- Interactive map of Dublanc Playing Field
- Location: Dublanc, Dominica
- Coordinates: 15.5134°N 61.4685°W
- Capacity: 500
- Surface: Grass

Tenants
- Dublanc FC; Dominica Premier League; Dominica First Division

The Dublanc Playing Field is an association football stadium in Dublanc on the Caribbean island nation of Dominica. The venue hosts matches at all levels, including the Dominica Premier League, First Division, the women's league, and various youth competitions.

== History ==
In 2023, the Dublanc Playing Field hosted a first-of-its-kind youth festival organized by the Dominica Football Association. Young players from throughout the island attended.
