= Reon Cuffy =

Dominica footballer

Reno Cuffy
Personal information
- Date of birth: 17 January 1999 (age 27)
- Place of birth: Woodford Hill, Dominica
- Height: 1.82 m (5 ft 11 1/2 in)
- Position: Striker

Team information
- Current team: East Central

Senior career*
Years	Team	Apps	(Gls)
2017–2018	Exodus		
2018–2019	East Central		
2019–2020	All Saints United		
2020–	East Central		

International career^{‡}
2018–	Dominica	14	(5)
- * Club domestic league appearances and goals ‡ National team caps and goals as of 14:50, 18 November 2026 (UTC)

Reon Cuffy (born 17 June 1999) is a Dominican footballer who currently plays for East Central FC of the Dominica Premier League, and the Dominica national team.

== Club career ==
Cuffy began his career with Exodus FC. In 2018 he moved to East Central FC of the Dominica Premier League. Following the season Cuffy moved to All Saints United of the Antigua and Barbuda Premier Division. The Dominican scored in the semi-finals of the Warrior Cup to help the Antiguan club reach the final. After one season with the club he returned to Dominica and East Central FC.

== International career ==
Cuffy made five appearances for Dominica in the 2018 CONCACAF U-20 Championship, scoring one goal. His goal came in a 3–2 victory over Saint Kitts and Nevis. In October 2018 he represented the under-20 team again in a series of youth friendlies hosted by the Barbados Football Association. Cuffy scored his team's second goal in an eventual 1–1 draw with the hosts. In July 2019 he was included in the under-23 squad for 2020 CONCACAF Men's Olympic Qualifying Championship qualification.

He was called up to the senior squad for the first time in March 2018. He went on to his senior international debut on 11 August 2018 in a friendly against Guadeloupe.

=== International goals ===
Scores and results list Dominica's goal tally first.

No.	Date	Venue	Opponent	Score	Result	Competition
1.	21 September 2026	Windsor Park, Roseau, Dominica	Anguilla	1–0	1–0	Friendly
2.	4 October 2026	Mayagüez Athletics Stadium, Mayagüez, Puerto Rico	Guyana	1–5	1–8	2026–27 CONCACAF Nations League B
3.	13 November 2026	Synthetic Track and Field Facility, Leonora, Guyana	Puerto Rico	2–4	2–4	2026–27 CONCACAF Nations League B
4.	17 November 2026	Synthetic Track and Field Facility, Leonora, Guyana	Cayman Islands	4–0	5–0	2026–27 CONCACAF Nations League B
5.	17 November 2026	Synthetic Track and Field Facility, Leonora, Guyana	Cayman Islands	5–0	5–0	2026–27 CONCACAF Nations League B
Last updated 18 November 2026

=== International career statistics ===
As of match played 17 November 2026.

Dominica
Year	Apps	Goals
2018	1	0
2019	1	0
2021	1	0
2024	1	0
2025	3	0
2026	7	5
Total	14	5
