= Glenson Prince =

Dominican footballer (born 1987)

Personal information
- Full name: Glenson (Leebeng) Vincent Prince
- Date of birth: 17 September 1987 (age 39)
- Place of birth: Roseau, Dominica
- Height: 1.83 m (6 ft 0 in)
- Position: Goalkeeper

Team information
- Current team: Dublanc FC

Senior career*
Years	Team	Apps	(Gls)
–2014	Northern Bombers		
2014	San Juan Jabloteh		
2015–2016	Northern Bombers		
2016–2017	Dublanc FC		
2017–2021	Phare Petit-Canal		
2021–	Dublanc FC		

International career^{‡}
- Dominica U20
2005–	Dominica	72	(0)
- * Club domestic league appearances and goals ‡ National team caps and goals as of 5 June 2024(UTC)

Glenson Prince (born 17 September 1987) is a Dominican footballer who plays as a goalkeeper for Dublanc FC and the Dominica national team. He has played abroad for Trinidadian club San Juan Jabloteh and Guadeloupean side Phare Petit-Canal.

== Early life ==
Prince began playing cricket before beginning football at age 11.

== Football career ==
Prince signed for TT Pro League club San Juan Jabloteh in September 2014.

As of 2014, he played for Northern Bombers that competes in the Dominica Premier League.

He was part of the 2015 Windward Islands Tournament team.

The last 2018 FIFA World Cup qualification match he played was in the second leg of 2018 FIFA World Cup qualification against Canada.

== Education ==
Prince is a full-time secondary school teacher.

Under the theme of 'Rebuilding Dominica Together' for the annual Dominica 2015 National Youth Rally, he encouraged Dominican youth to participate in more extracurricular sporting activities as proponent of sport. He announced that Dominica was celebrating its 37th year of independence and its theme of recovering "from the ravages of Tropical Storm Erika."
