= Mahaut Soca Strikers FC =

- Founded: 2010; 16 years ago
- Ground: DFA Technical Center Stadium
- Capacity: 2,000
- League: Dominica Premier League
- 2025: 2th of 10

Mahaut Soca Strikers FC is a Dominican professional football club from Mahaut that currently plays in the Dominica Premier League.

== History ==
Mahaut Soca Strikers FC was established in 2010. The club won the Dominica First Division in 2017, defeating Harlem United in the final, and earning promotion back to the Premier League. By 2020, the club was back in the First Division. The team remained in the second tier the following season as it again attempted to return to the Premiere League. The club advanced to at least the quarterfinals of the 2022 DFA President's Cup.
