= Dominica national football team =

Men's association football team

Dominica
- Association: Dominica Football Association (DFA)
- Confederation: CONCACAF (North America)
- Sub-confederation: CFU (Caribbean)
- Head coach: Kurt Herd
- Captain: Glenson Prince
- Most caps: Glenson Prince (80)
- Top scorer: Julian Wade (20)
- Home stadium: DFA Technical Center Stadium; Windsor Park
- FIFA code: DMA
First colours	Second colours

FIFA ranking
- Current: 184 ▲2 (18 November 2026)
- Highest: 128 (November 2010, February 2011)
- Lowest: 198 (July 2009)

First international
- Dominica 1–0 Martinique (Dominica; 1932)

Biggest win
- Dominica 10–0 British Virgin Islands (San Cristóbal, Dominican Republic; October 15, 2010)

Biggest defeat
- Mexico 10–0 Dominica (San Antonio, United States; June 19, 2004)

The Dominica national football team represents Dominica in men's international football, and is governed by the Dominica Football Association, the governing body for football in Dominica founded in 1970. It has been a full member of FIFA and CONCACAF since 1994, and is also a member of CFU in the Caribbean Zone.

Dominica has never qualified for the FIFA World Cup and the CONCACAF Gold Cup, but has participated three times in League B and twice in League C of the CONCACAF Nations League.

Dominica's debut in international competitions was in the 1981 CFU Championship qualifying tournament, and its first appearance in World Cup qualifiers was for 1998 qualification. The team's first victory was in 1932 by defeating Martinique 1–0, which was also its first match ever.

== History ==
=== Beginnings ===
Dominica played its first international match in 1932, against Martinique, a match that ended in a 1–0 victory. In the 1940s they participated in the 1948 Coupe des Caraibes, losing in the preliminaries against Martinique 5–0 but qualified due to Trinidad and Tobago's withdrawal. In the competition proper, Dominica again faced Martinique, losing 6–0 and being eliminated.

In the 1960s and 1970s, Dominica played in several editions of the Windward Islands Tournament, winning the competition in 1971 with two 3–0 victories over Saint Vincent and Grenada, and a 2–2 draw against Saint Lucia. In the 1980s, Dominica regularly participated in the qualifying rounds of the CFU Championship, although they were unable to make it into the tournament proper.

=== 1990s ===
After the creation of the Caribbean Cup in 1989, Dominica was only able to qualify for the group stage in the 1994 edition. They could not get past the first phase, after losing to the hosts Trinidad and Tobago 5–0 and Guadeloupe 4–0. They were only able to draw 1–1 with Barbados. They next qualified for the 1998 Caribbean Cup, being eliminated again in the first round, this time with three defeats against Martinique 5–1, Antigua and Barbuda 2–1 and Trinidad and Tobago 8–0. Dominica has not managed to return to the final phase of the Caribbean Cup since.

Dominica participated in World Cup qualification for the first time in the 1998 qualifiers beating Antigua and Barbuda in the first round (3–3 in Roseau and 1–3 in St. John's) before losing in the second phase to Barbados (1–0 in both Roseau and Bridgetown).

=== 2000–present ===
In the 2002 qualifiers, the Pericos succumbed to Haiti 7–1 on aggregate, and in the 2006 qualifiers, after beating the Bahamas with an aggregate result of 4–2, the Dominicans faced the Mexican team that crushed them 10–0 in the first leg, then 8–0 at Aguascalientes. The decade would end with an elimination at the hands of Barbados, just like in 1996, this time as part of the 2010 qualifiers (1–1 in Roseau and 0–1 in Bridgetown).

On 15 October 2010, Dominica achieved the greatest victory in its history, beating the British Virgin Islands 10–0, with 5 goals from striker Kurlson Benjamin - in the first qualifying round of the 2010 Caribbean Cup. The following year, in the 2014 World Cup qualifiers, Dominica was drawn against Panama and Nicaragua. They lost all four of their games, failing to score a goal and conceding 11. They were eliminated from 2018 World Cup qualification by Canada, who beat them 6–0 over two legs.

== Results and fixtures ==
The following is a list of match results in the last 12 months, as well as any future matches that have been scheduled.

Win Draw Loss Fixture

=== 2025 ===
12 November 2025-26 CONCACAF Series	Dominica	1–2	Saint Martin	Basseterre, Saint Kitts and Nevis
16:00 UTC−4	Jules 47'	Report	Bellechasse 79', 90+1' (pen.)	Stadium: SKNFA Technical Center; Referee: Randy Encarnación (Dominican Republic)

15 November 2025-26 CONCACAF Series	Dominica	2–3	Sint Maarten	Basseterre, Saint Kitts and Nevis
16:00 UTC−4	Joseph 43', 71'	Report	Bleeker 22'; de Nooijer 66'; Amatkarijo 75' (pen.)	Stadium: SKNFA Technical Center

=== 2026 ===
27 March 2025–26 CONCACAF Series	Guyana	2–0	Dominica	Santiago de los Caballeros, Dominican Republic
16:30 UTC−4	De Rosario 28', 31'	Report		Stadium: Estadio Cibao FC; Referee: Patrick Senecharles (Haiti)

30 March 2025–26 CONCACAF Series	Dominica	0–0	Sint Maarten	Santiago de los Caballeros, Dominican Republic
19:30 UTC−4		Report		Stadium: Estadio Cibao FC; Referee: Adrian Lage (Cuba)

24 September 2026–27 CONCACAF Nations League	Cayman Islands	0-0	Dominica	Roseau, Dominica
20:00 UTC−4		Report		Stadium: Windsor Park

27 September 2026–27 CONCACAF Nations League	Dominica	0-2	Puerto Rico	Roseau, Dominica
20:00 UTC−4		Report	Sulia 4' Rivera 37'	Stadium: Windsor Park

1 October 2026–27 CONCACAF Nations League	Dominica	1-5	Guyana	Mayagüez, Puerto Rico
17:00 UTC−4	Jules 75'	Report	De Rosario 27' Glasgow 41' Moore 50' Benjamin 79' George 90'	Stadium: Mayagüez Athletics Stadium

4 October 2026–27 CONCACAF Nations League	Guyana	8-1	Dominica	Mayagüez, Puerto Rico
15:00 UTC−4	Glasgow 5', 33' Moore 18', 57' Bonds 24', 75' Kellman 53' George 69'	Report	Reon Cuffy 67'	Stadium: Mayagüez Athletics Stadium

13 November 2026–27 CONCACAF Nations League	Puerto Rico	4–2	Dominica	Georgetown, Guyana
15:00 UTC−4	R. Rivera 38' (pen.); W. Rivera 56'; Díaz 83'; Rosario 87'	Report	Sharpe 77'; Cuffy 90+1'	Stadium: Synthetic Track and Field Facility; Referee: Victor Rivas (United States)

17 November 2026–27 CONCACAF Nations League	Dominica	5–0	Cayman Islands	Georgetown, Guyana
15:00 UTC−4	Carbon 33'; Sharpe 63'; Jeremy 65'; Cuffy 72', 77'	Report		Stadium: Synthetic Track and Field Facility; Referee: Ismael Cornejo (El Salvador)

== Coaching history ==
- (Dominica) Clifford Celaire (1996)
- (Germany) Helmut Kosmehl (2000)
- (Dominica) Don Leogal (2004)
- (Dominica) Clifford Celaire (2005–2006)
- (Dominica) Christopher Ericson (2008–2009)
- (Dominica) Kurt Hector (2009–2013)
- (Dominica) Ronnie Gustave (2013–2014)
- (Dominica) Shane Marshall (2014–2017)
- (Trinidad and Tobago) Rajesh Latchoo (2017–2022)
- (Dominica) Colin Bernard (2022–2023)
- (Dominica) Ellington Sabin (2022–2025)
- (Scotland) Kurt Herd (interim) (2026–present)

== Players ==
=== Current squad ===
The following players were called up for the 2026–27 CONCACAF Nations League B matches against Puerto Rico and Cayman Islands on 13 and 17 November 2026.

Caps and goals correct as of 17 November 2026, after the match against Cayman Islands.

No.	Pos.	Player	Date of birth (age)	Caps	Goals	Club
1	GK	Dwight Eloi	26 November 2008 (age 17)	2	0	(Dominica Football Association) Bath Estate
22	GK	Shamal George	6 January 1998 (age 28)	2	0	(The Football Association) Bromley
19	DF	Briel Thomas	25 November 1994 (age 31)	64	8	(Dominica Football Association) Dublanc
4	DF	Eustace Marshall	14 February 1997 (age 29)	25	1	(Dominica Football Association) Bath Estate
13	DF	Marcus Bredas	29 November 2003 (age 22)	21	0	(Dominica Football Association) Point Michel
3	DF	Tobi Jno Hope	4 October 1997 (age 29)	7	0	Free Agent
5	DF	Jaylan Jno Ville	11 April 2006 (age 20)	4	0	(Dominica Football Association) Portsmouth Bombers
2	DF	Titus Sandy Jr	19 January 2002 (age 24)	4	0	(United States Soccer Federation) Orlando City B
17	DF	Harvey-Joe Bertrand	25 March 2002 (age 24)	2	0	(The Football Association) Dorchester Town
9	MF	Javid George	14 June 1998 (age 28)	43	3	(Jamaica Football Federation) Harbour View
11	MF	Savio Anselm	21 September 2002 (age 24)	16	0	(Dominica Football Association) Dublanc
20	MF	Lyan Edwards	8 December 2005 (age 20)	7	0	(Dominica Football Association) WE United
8	MF	Dhamario Challenger	14 May 2006 (age 20)	5	0	(Dominica Football Association) South East
16	MF	Cobin Paul	14 August 2000 (age 26)	6	0	(Dominica Football Association) Dublanc
6	MF	Trivine Esprit	14 February 2002 (age 24)	2	0	(Canadian Soccer Association) Simcoe County Rovers
14	FW	Reon Cuffy	17 January 1999 (age 27)	13	5	(Dominica Football Association) East Central
18	FW	Donte Warrington	18 October 2004 (age 22)	10	0	(Dominica Football Association) Point Michel
7	FW	Malachi Sharpe	21 November 2005 (age 21)	2	2	Free Agent
10	FW	Jayden Carbon	4 August 2005 (age 21)	2	1	(The Football Association) Middlesbrough
15	FW	Theo Jeremy	25 March 2006 (age 20)	2	1	(Gibraltar Football Association) Europa Point

== Records ==
As of 12 July 2026
Players in bold are still active with Dominica.

=== Most appearances ===
Rank	Player	Caps	Goals	Career
1	**Glenson Prince**	80	0	2005–present
2	**Briel Thomas**	56	8	2013–present
3	**Chad Bertrand**	53	6	2010–present
4	**Julian Wade**	52	20	2010–present
5	**Travist Joseph**	45	5	2015–present
6	Malcolm Joseph	39	1	2011–2022
7	**Javid George**	36	3	2018–present
8	**Erskim Williams**	32	0	2013–present
9	**Audel Laville**	31	11	2018–present
10	Sidney Lockhart	28	0	2014–2022

=== Top goalscorers ===
Rank	Player	Goals	Caps	Ratio	Career
1	**Julian Wade**	20	52	0.38	2010–present
2	Kurlson Benjamin	14	22	0.64	2008–2018
3	**Audel Laville**	11	31	0.35	2018–present
4	**Briel Thomas**	8	62	0.13	2013–present
5	Kelly Peters	7	14	0.5	1999–2011
5	**Chad Bertrand**	7	58	0.12	2010–present
7	Vincent Casimir	5	10	0.5	2000–2004
7	**Troy Jules**	5	14	0.36	2023–present
7	Mitchell Joseph	5	21	0.24	2005–2015
7	**Travist Joseph**	5	45	0.11	2010–present

== Competitive record ==
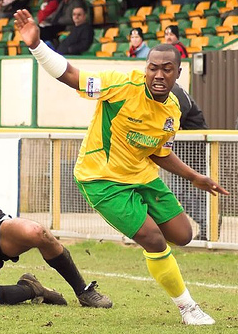
Richard Pacquette played for the national football team of Dominica

=== FIFA World Cup ===
FIFA World Cup record									Qualification					
Year	Round	Position	Pld	W	D*	L	GF	GA	Pld	W	D	L	GF	GA
1930 to 1978	Part of United Kingdom								Part of United Kingdom					
1982 to 1994	Not a FIFA member								Not a FIFA member					
(France) 1998	Did not qualify								4	1	1	2	6	6
(South Korea) (Japan) 2002	Did not qualify								2	0	0	2	1	7
(Germany) 2006	Did not qualify								4	1	1	2	4	20
(South Africa) 2010	Did not qualify								2	0	1	1	1	2
(Brazil) 2014	Did not qualify								4	0	0	4	0	11
(Russia) 2018	Did not qualify								4	1	1	2	3	8
(Qatar) 2022	Did not qualify								4	1	1	2	5	4
(Canada) (Mexico) (United States) 2026	Did not qualify								4	1	0	3	5	14
(Morocco) (Portugal) (Spain) 2030	To be determined								Qualification yet to start					
(Saudi Arabia) 2034	To be determined								Qualification yet to start					
Total		0/8							28	5	5	18	25	72

=== CONCACAF Gold Cup ===
CONCACAF Championship / Gold Cup record										Qualification record					
Year	Round	Position	Pld	W	D*	L	GF	GA	Squad	Pld	W	D	L	GF	GA
1963 to 1991	Did not enter									Did not enter					
(United States) (Mexico) 1993	Did not qualify									3	0	0	3	5	8
(United States) 1996	Did not qualify									2	0	1	1	0	1
(United States) 1998	Did not qualify									5	3	0	2	13	10
(United States) 2000	Did not qualify									6	2	1	3	9	18
(United States) 2002	Did not qualify									3	0	0	3	3	8
(United States) (Mexico) 2003	Withdrew									Withdrew					
(United States) 2005	Did not qualify									3	0	0	3	1	16
(United States) 2007	Did not qualify									3	0	1	2	0	5
(United States) 2009	Did not qualify									2	0	0	2	1	6
(United States) 2011	Did not qualify									5	2	1	2	13	9
(United States) 2013	Did not qualify									3	1	0	2	4	5
(United States) (Canada) 2015	Did not qualify									3	0	1	2	1	7
(United States) 2017	Did not qualify									4	1	0	3	9	10
(United States) (Costa Rica) (Jamaica) 2019	Did not qualify									4	2	1	1	6	5
(United States) 2021	Did not qualify									6	1	0	5	3	14
(United States) (Canada) 2023	Did not qualify									4	0	2	2	2	5
(United States) (Canada) 2025	Did not qualify									6	1	1	4	6	18
Total		0/28	0	0	0	0	0	0	—	62	13	9	40	76	145

=== CONCACAF Nations League ===
CONCACAF Nations League record
League										Finals								
Season	Division	Group	Pld	W	D	L	GF	GA	P/R	Finals	Result	Pld	W	D	L	GF	GA	Squad
2019–20	B	D	6	1	0	5	3	14	▼	(United States) 2021	Ineligible							
2022–23	C	C	4	0	2	2	2	5	Same position	(United States) 2023	Ineligible							
2023–24	C	C	4	3	1	0	8	2	▲	(United States) 2024	Ineligible							
2024–25	B	D	6	1	1	4	6	18	Same position	(United States) 2025	Ineligible							
Total	—	—	20	5	4	11	19	39	—	Total	0 Titles	—	—	—	—	—	—	—

=== Caribbean Cup ===
Caribbean Cup record
Year	Round	Pld	W	D	L	GF	GA
1989 and 1990	Did not qualify						
(Jamaica) 1991	Did not enter						
1992 and 1993	Did not qualify						
(Trinidad and Tobago) 1994	Group stage	3	0	1	2	1	11
1995 to 1997	Did not qualify						
(Trinidad and Tobago) (Jamaica) 1998	Group stage	3	0	0	3	2	15
1999 to 2017	Did not qualify						
Total	2/19	6	0	1	5	3	26

== Honours ==
=== Friendly / Unofficial ===
- Windward Islands Tournament (3): 1971, 1985, 1988
