= Ellington Sabin =

Dominica football manager

Personal information
- Date of birth: 9 September 1981 (age 45)
- Place of birth: Portsmouth, Dominica

Team information
- Current team: Portsmouth Bombers (Manager)

Managerial career
- Years: Team
- 2016–2017: Dominica (Assistant)
- 2018–: Portsmouth Bombers
- 2019–2022: Dominica (Assistant)
- 2022–2025: Dominica
- ‡ National team caps and goals as of 19:33, 23 August 2023 (UTC)

Ellington Sabin (born 9 September 1981) is a Dominica football manager who currently manages Dominica Premier League club Portsmouth Bombers FC.

== Managerial career ==
Sabin was named an assistant coach of the Dominica national team under head coach Shane Marshall in 2016 ahead of 2017 Caribbean Cup qualification. The next year, he was retained as an assistant as Marshall resigned and Rajesh Latchoo stepped into the role. Sabin became head coach of Portsmouth Bombers FC of the Dominica Premier League in 2018.

After five years as an assistant to Latchoo in the national setup, Sabin was named head coach of the national team in November 2022. He debuted in his new role on 27 March 2023 as Dominica battled Saint Lucia in the country's final match of the 2022–23 CONCACAF Nations League C. The match ended in a 1–3 defeat. Sabin retained his position as head coach of the Portsmouth Bombers while also head coach of the national team.

=== Managerial record ===
As of match played on 15 November 2025

Managerial record by team and tenure
Team	From	To	Record								Ref
Team	From	To	G	W	D	L	GF	GA	GD	Win %	Ref
Dominica	November 2022	December 2025	17	5	4	8	21	34	−13	29.41	
