= WE United FC =

- Full name: WE United Football Club
- Founded: 2017; 9 years ago
- Ground: Castle Bruce Playing Field Castle Bruce
- League: Dominica Premier League
- 2026: 5th of 10

WE United FC is a Dominican professional football club from Castle Bruce that currently plays in the Dominica Premier League. The club also fields reserve, women, and youth teams. They are one of two clubs in the country's eastern district, along with East Central FC.

== History ==
The club was founded in 2017. After one season in the First Division, the club earned promotion to the Premier League for the 2019/20 season. In June 2021 the club signed a major sponsorship agreement with Valvoline. The team finished third in the 2022 Patrick John Cup. With the victory over Harlem United in the bronze medal match, the club secured the first trophy in its history. WE United and Dominica national team goalkeeper Raleighson Pascal was named the player of the match.

== Domestic history ==
Key

Champion Runners-up 3rd Place

| Season | League | | | | | | | Domestic Cup | Notes |
| Season | Div. | Pos. | Pl. | W | D | L | P | Domestic Cup | Notes |
|---|---|---|---|---|---|---|---|---|---|
| 2019 | 2nd | 1st | | | | | | | Group B winners, promoted to Dominica Premier League |
| 2020 | 1st | 6th | 18 | 8 | 3 | 7 | 27 | | |
| 2021 | 1st | 6th | 13 | 5 | 1 | 7 | 16 | | |
| 2022 | 1st | | | | | | | | |
| 2023 | 1st | 8th | 17 | 5 | 1 | 11 | 16 | | |
