= Caribbean Professional Football League (1992 to 1995) =

Caribbean Professional Football League (CPFL)
- Founded: 1992
- Abolished: 1995
- Region: Caribbean

The Caribbean Professional Football League was a short-lived association football competition spanning several Caribbean nations. The aim of the competition was to introduce professional standard football to the Caribbean region.

The participating teams were franchises created by local businessmen and the teams featured full international players. Players such as Theodore Whitmore and Rodney Jack participated in the competition. The league proved to be problematic and the Kingston Gleaner reported that it had made "significant losses" before the end of the inaugural competition.

In June 1993, the Jamaican press reported that the CPFL had "toiled miserably in its second year and come under fire from competing teams who have incurred heavy financial losses brought on by inefficient organization". Christopher Ziadie, a player and director at the Kingston Lions franchise revealed that it had lost JMD $1.7m in two years and that in some cases less than 50 people would attend a game. Ziadie went on to describe the CPFL as a "shabby league" and blamed poor organisation. In some cases, matches were delayed on the date they were scheduled to be played.

Harold Taylor, a competition organiser and the Caribbean Football Union secretary said that the problem with the competition is lack of promotion and as a result "no one cares" about it, he also said that he hadn't attended a game. Jack Warner claim in 2005, that the league folded because they "could not depend on the vagaries of the airlines in the region".

In October 1994, the competition was re-branded as Caribbean Major League Football. Hopes were high for the competition and it was reported that the television rights to show the competition in USA and Canada for the competition were to be sold for $1.5m US dollars. CMLF Chairman Kelly Pierre also said that he was in talks with Asian and European businesses.

Despite the reports, funding was short and The CFU and CMLF had a dispute over the organisation of competition. Warner announced that the CFU wanted to re-take control of the competition as he felt "the professional league is needed for the Caribbean's success in football". Warner also said that the CMLF had defaulted on several loans and owed the Caribbean Football Union $250k US dollars.

The commissioner and Chief Executive of the league was New York-based Brazilian Jorge Campos, the owner of the St. Lucia based All Stars franchise. The Caribbean Major League Football company was registered in Barbados.

The newly re-branded competition was delayed from March, to April, to May and delayed again to August 1995. The competition was set to be a sixteen-team championship but due to spiraling costs the format was changed. The sixteen teams were divided into two zones where teams could play up to three fixtures in a week at a host nation to keep travel costs down. The CFU President (and Simpaul Travel company owner) Jack Warner was unhappy with the arrangement. By August, four teams had pulled out of the competition leaving twelve teams remaining, the decision was made to split the teams into three groups of four. The competition never took place.

== Participating Clubs ==
1992	1993	1994	1995
(Saint Lucia) All Stars; (Saint Vincent and the Grenadines) Hairoun Lions; (Jamaica) Kingston Lions; (Tobago) St. Clair Coaching School; (Trinidad and Tobago) Trinidad & Tobago Hawks; (Jamaica) Wavers (Note: Changed their name to Reno International)	(Jamaica) Kingston Lions; (Trinidad and Tobago) Malta Carib Alcons; (Saint Lucia) Panthers; (Grenada) R.E. Walker Nationals; (Tobago) St. Clair Coaching School; Trinidad and Tobago Hawks	(Trinidad and Tobago) Caledonia AIA; (Jamaica) Cornwall County Lions; (Guyana) Georgetown Cobras; (Saint Vincent and the Grenadines) Hairoun Lions; (Barbados) Lambada; (Jamaica) Harbour View; Tobago Young Pros (Note: Also known as Scarborough Young Pros); (Trinidad and Tobago) Trinity Professionals	(Haiti) Boyo Stars; (Trinidad and Tobago) Caledonia AIA; (Jamaica) Cornwall County Lions; (Guyana) Georgetown Cobras; (Saint Vincent and the Grenadines) Hairoun Lions; (Jamaica) Harbour View; (Barbados) Lambada; (Aruba) Riverplate; (Tobago) Scarborough Young Pros; (Grenada) Spice Nationals; (Trinidad and Tobago) Trinity Professionals; (Antigua and Barbuda) Wadadli Deers

- A team called Pele from Guyana applied to enter the CPFL in November 1992.
- Another team which was referred to as Bajan Superstars from Barbados were also considering competing.

== Previous winners ==
Year	Winner	Runner-up	Third-place	Fourth-place	Source
Caribbean Professional Football League
1992	Trinidad and Tobago Hawks	(Jamaica) Kingston Lions			
1993	(Trinidad and Tobago) Malta Carib Alcons	(Saint Lucia) Panthers	(Grenada) RE Walker Nationals	(Trinidad and Tobago) St. Clair	
1994	(Trinidad and Tobago) Trinity Professionals	(Jamaica) Cornwall County Lions			

== Other ventures ==
=== CFU Club Championship ===
Two years after the collapse of the Caribbean Professional Football League, the CFU Club Championship was created by the Caribbean Football Union led by Jack Warner. The tournament acts as a qualifying competition for the CONCACAF Champions Cup for Caribbean club teams. Warner's own club Joe Public FC won the competition in 1998 and 2000.

=== USL Caribbean League ===
There have been calls for a new trans-border Caribbean Super League to be created in the wake of the Caribbean Professional Football League.

In March 2010, the American United Soccer Leagues company were considering operating a league in the Caribbean region. USL announced that it had held talks with the Puerto Rico Soccer League (PRSL) with regards to expanding the USL branding in Puerto Rico and other Caribbean nations. The USL suggested that a minimum of four PRSL teams would be included in the new division.

The idea of expansion had come to the fore following the formation of Puerto Rico Islanders and Antigua Barracuda, both were the first professional soccer club in their respective country. Bermuda Hogges of Bermuda participate in the USL's Premier Development League.

Puerto Rican team Sevilla FC Juncos revealed that they were looking at the possibility of playing in the league in 2011 whilst their reserve team continue to play in the local Puerto Rican league.

[Expanding USL in] The Caribbean has made a lot of sense to us all along, and we go all the way back to 1995 when the Puerto Rico Islanders, in their first inception, first joined USL. As the Islanders became a force on and off the field, it became more and more sensible to start looking at the Caribbean as a whole because we recognize the region for its talent, but at the same time we also recognize they have challenges in terms of distances and their capabilities from island to island.

— Francisco Marcos

However, the plans for a Caribbean League were cancelled when USL merged the First Division and Second Division into the unified USL Pro which operates as Tier 3 in the American soccer pyramid. In September 2010 USL invited three Caribbean teams to join USL Pro; Antigua Barracuda FC, Club Atletico River Plate Puerto Rico, and Sevilla FC Puerto Rico with the intention of adding at least two more teams; Puerto Rico United and Indios de Mayaguez FC.

Caribbean collapse

The Puerto Rico Islanders chose to play in the NASL instead. The Puerto Rico Islanders announced that they would not be competing in the 2013 and latterly the 2014 NASL season, instead they had chosen to go on hiatus. Meanwhile, in the tier below, the USL Pro team, Antigua Barracuda completed three consecutive seasons where they finished sixth, eleventh and thirteenth position in the league. The Barracudas folded following the 2013 USL Pro season.

Bermuda Hogges, the other Caribbean Football Union affiliated team in the US announced their withdrawal from the Premier Development League due to financial difficulties.

== CONCACAF task force ==
In October 2013 Jeffrey Webb suggested that a professional league in the Caribbean was needed to raise the competitiveness of national teams from the Caribbean Football Union. A task force which was charged with determining the feasibility of a Caribbean Pro League was convened in Montego Bay, Jamaica on November 7 and 8.

=== Major League Futbol proposal ===
Chris Anderson, a Trinidadian businessman with experience in sports marketing through his PlusOne company, created the Barbados-registered Caribbean Football Trust Limited (CFTL)' company. A press release was created citing the creation of Major League Futbol, although little detail was given. Anderson stated that he has been considering the proposals since 2002. Anderson is seeking sponsors to raise $3m USD for prize money and hopes to see 20 clubs participate in the league from 2015 onwards.

The Jamaican Football Federation's Horace Burrell stated that "there is no infrastructural development across the Caribbean to accommodate such a football competition in a structured way" and that there "is so much that needs to be done before we can start looking at that, such as the level of financing and travel.". Damien Hughes, the Caribbean Football Union CEO stated that any Caribbean Super League would need permission from CONCACAF and national associations and advised Anderson to make contact to discuss his proposals.

=== New Caribbean Football League (CFL) ===
It will start because of a new $20 million kit sponsor. It will be a three-month season starting at the end of May. It is expected that the league will include marquee players from South America, Central America and Europe. Although the majority of the league will be made up of domestic based players.

The fixture for the new league will be played on Fridays, Saturdays and Wednesdays. The Friday and Saturday games will be played in Trinidad and Tobago whereas games on Wednesday will be moved all across the different Caribbean islands.

The season will be preceded by a three-month combine and trial period with players trying out for spots and to facilitate a USA-type draft observed in leagues like the NBA in the build-up to the start of the League.

=== Caribbean Professional League Working Group ===
In April 2020, CONCACAF launched a Caribbean Professional League Working Group, which will carry out a comprehensive study of Caribbean professional club football. Members include representatives from CONCACAF, CFU, FIFA, and five Caribbean associations: Trinidad and Tobago, Jamaica, Haiti, Dominican Republic, and Curaçao.
