= Quick Zone Icons =

The Quick Zone Icons are a Dominica football club based in Delices. As of the 2009/10 season, the club plays in the Dominica Premier League, the top tier of Dominica football.
