= Clifford Celaire =

Dominica football manager

Personal information
- Place of birth: Dominica

Managerial career
- Years: Team
- 1996: Dominica
- 2005–06: Dominica

Clifford George Celaire is a Dominica professional manager.

In 1996 and 2005–06 he was a head coach of the Dominica national football team. Until July 2012 he worked as General Secretary of the Dominica Football Association
