= Wacky Rollers FC =

- Full name: Wacky Rollers Football Club
- Ground: Windsor Park, Roseau
- Capacity: 12,000
- League: Dominica First Division
- 2018–19: Premier League, 10th (relegated)
Home colours

Wacky Rollers Football Club is a Dominican football club based in Saint Joseph. The club most recently played in the top tier, Dominica Premier League, but were relegated to the Dominican Division One.

== Honours ==
- Dominica First Division: 2009–10
