= Northern Bombers =

Northern Bombers may refer to:

- North Launceston Football Club, an Australian rules football based in Launceston, Tasmania, Australia, nicknamed the Northern Bombers
- Northern Bombers FC, an association football club based in Portsmouth, Dominica
