= 2017–18 Dominica Premier League =

Dominica Premier League
- Season: 2017–18

The 2017–18 Dominica Premier League is the 53rd season of the Dominica Premier League, the top tier of association football in Dominica. The season began on 25 August 2017, but was abandoned due to hurricane damage.

== Standings ==
Pos	Team	Pld	W	D	L	GF	GA	GD	Pts
1	Promex Harlem United (Newtown)	4	3	0	1	11	5	+6	9
2	Dublanc FC (Dublanc)	4	2	1	1	17	4	+13	7
3	Northern Concrete & Steel Bombers (Portsmouth)	3	2	1	0	8	3	+5	7
4	Bath Estate FC (Roseau)	4	2	1	1	7	5	+2	7
5	Middleham United (Cockrane)	3	2	0	1	9	6	+3	6
6	Sagicor South East (La Plaine)	3	1	2	0	5	2	+3	5
7	Mahaut Soca Strikers	3	1	1	1	5	7	−2	4
8	Petro Caribe Pointe Michel FC (Pointe Michel)	4	1	0	3	7	9	−2	3
9	Kelver Darroux Exodus FC (Saint Joseph)	3	0	0	3	3	13	−10	0
10	Wacky Rollers SC (Layou)	3	0	0	3	3	21	−18	0

Rules for classification: 1) points; 2) goal difference; 3) number of goals scored.
