= Kurt Herd =

Scottish football manager

Personal information
- Place of birth: Dundee, Scotland

Team information
- Current team: Dominica (manager)

Managerial career
- Years: Team
- 2026: Dominica (caretaker)
- 2026–: Dominica

Kurt Herd is a Scottish professional football manager who manages the Dominica national football team.

== Early life ==
Herd was born in Scotland. Growing up, he attended Dundee and Angus College in Scotland. Following his stint there, he attended Abertay University in Scotland.

== Career ==
Herd started his managerial career as a youth manager of Swedish side Svenska FotbọIIsakademịn at the age of sixteen. At the age of eighteen, he was appointed as a youth manager of Australian side Magic United.

In 2019, he was appointed manager of Scottish side Abertay University, helping the team win the league title. Subsequently, he was appointed as a youth manager of Malaysian side FC Kuala Lumpur in 2019. Six years later, he was appointed manager of the Dominica national football team.

== Personal life ==
Herd is a native of Dundee, Scotland. During the summer of 2019, Herd obtained the UEFA B License.
