= Robert Rosado =

Dominican Republic footballer (b. 1995)

Personal information
- Full name: Robert Raynier Rosado Berry
- Date of birth: 15 July 1995 (age 31)
- Place of birth: Villa Tapia, Dominican Republic
- Height: 1.75 m (5 ft 9 in)
- Position: Midfielder

Team information
- Current team: Atlético Pantoja
- Number: 16

Senior career*
Years	Team	Apps	(Gls)
2014	Deportivo Pantoja		
2015–	Atlético Pantoja	106	(12)

International career^{‡}
2017-2023	Dominican Republic	3	(0)
- * Club domestic league appearances and goals ‡ National team caps and goals as of 22 March 2018

Robert Raynier Rosado Berry (born 15 July 1995) is a Dominican professional footballer who plays as a midfielder for Liga DF club Atlético Pantoja and the Dominican Republic national team.

== International career ==
Rosado made his formal debut for Dominican Republic on 22 March 2018, starting in a 4–0 friendly win against Turks and Caicos Islands. He had played two friendly matches in November 2017 against Nicaragua, but they were not recognised by FIFA.
