= DFA Technical Center =

Sports venue in Roseau, Dominica

DFA Technical Center Stadium
- Interactive map of DFA Technical Center Stadium
- Location: Stock Farm, Roseau, Dominica
- Coordinates: 15.3103°N 61.3830°W
- Capacity: 2,000
- Surface: Artificial Turf

Construction
- Built: 2014–2016
- Cost: US$250,000 (Initial)
- General contractors: Jars Sales and Services

Tenants
- Dominica Premier League; Dominica national team

The Dominica Football Association Technical Center is located in the Stock Farm area of Roseau on the Caribbean island nation of Dominica. The center serves as the technical headquarters of the Dominica Football Association while the Football House in Bath Estate serves as the administrative center.

The complex also contains the 2,000-seat DFA Technical Center Stadium which hosts matches of the Dominica Premier League and the Dominica national football team.

== History ==
Phase Two, the main portion of construction of the DFA Technical Center, was originally scheduled to begin in 2012 but stalled because of a lack of funds. After a two-year delay, work began in January 2014, with funding provided by FIFA's Goal Project program. After several setbacks resulting from amendments to contracts, work on the project was being finalized by May 2015, including dressing rooms, washrooms for both spectators and players, a drive through, parking areas, and an office for DFA officials at the new 2,000-seat facility. DFA President Glen Etienne stated that the stadium would be the first in the nation that is completely fenced in, allowing the association to sell tickets to generate funds for both the association and clubs. It would also give the national teams a permanent home that could be used year-round.

A FIFA official surveyed the project in autumn 2014 and was pleased with the progress. He stated that FIFA was prepared to fully fund all phases of construction. Funding for the next stage of the project was approved in November 2015. In this phase, the playing surface would be re-leveled and Bermuda grass would be planted to improve the field conditions. The project was expected to be fully complete and ready for use in June 2016. In November 2018, it was announced that lighting would be added to the facility. Work was expected to commence the following month and be completed by March 2019. After a lengthy delay, the project began in November 2021 with at a cost of US$206,412.

The DFA put out a call for bids in 2021 to enlarge the eastern, main grandstand at the stadium. By April 2023, work was well underway to replace the stadium's grass surface with artificial turf. In July 2023, the installation of the new playing surface was completed. The new surface was expected to greatly improve the facility for training and matches of the country's national teams. At the DFA annual General Meeting in July 2024, the association approved construction of additional dressing rooms and the addition of a roof over the east stand.

The stadium hosted its first match of the Dominica national team on 8 May 2025, a friendly against Barbados. The match ended in a 0–0 draw.
