= Caribbean Football Union =

Governing body for association football in the Caribbean

- Abbreviation: CFU
- Formation: 28 January 1978; 48 years ago
- Type: Sports organisation
- Headquarters: Barbados
- Members: 31 member associations
- General Secretary: Camara David
- President: Lyndon Cooper

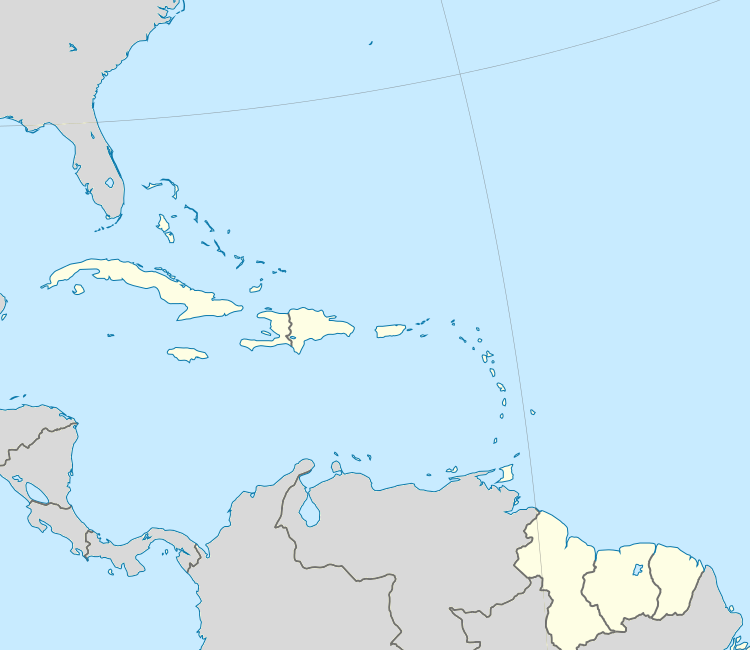
CFU countries location map

The Caribbean Football Union (CFU) is the representative organization for football associations in the Caribbean. It represents 25 FIFA member nations, as well as six territories that are not affiliated with FIFA. The Union was established in January 1978 and its member associations compete in the CONCACAF region.

The CFU runs multiple competitions, including the CFU Club Shield, CONCACAF Caribbean Cup, and youth challenge series.

== History ==
The formation of the Caribbean Football Union is credited to former Trinidad and Tobago national footballer Patrick Raymond. In 1976, he approached Phil Woosnam, the Jamaica Commissioner of the North American Soccer League (NASL), about ownership of a Caribbean franchise within the NASL, and instead, Woosnam proposed the formation of a Caribbean Professional League. Acting on Woosnam's advice, and with assistance from former England player-turned businessman Jimmy Hill and his company World Sports Academy, plus the recommendation of former FIFA President Sir Stanley Rous, that a Caribbean regional governing body as a sub-group within CONCACAF be the first order of business, Raymond introduced the initiative in August 1977 in Port of Spain, Trinidad, that eventually led to the formation of the Caribbean Football Union (CFU). The CFU was inaugurated on 28 January 1978, in Port-au-Prince, Haiti, as the Caribbean region's governing football body and a sub-group within CONCACAF.

A previous effort to establish a Caribbean regional governing body was the British Caribbean Football Association (BCFA) in January 1957, with the Trinidad & Tobago FA's President Ken Galt as the BCFA's president, and the TTFA's Secretary Eric James as General Secretary, and in 1959, a representative BCFA team toured the UK.

In May 2013, under the direction of Damien E. Hughes, the CFU relocated their offices from Port-of-Spain, Trinidad to Kingston, Jamaica. In August 2015, Hughes was replaced by Antiguan Neil Cochrane. Cochrane announced that several jobs would be moved from Jamaica to Antigua and a smaller headquarters would be rented.

== Corruption scandal ==
The union was embroiled in a scandal in May 2011 after several representatives of Caribbean Football Associations had been given brown paper envelopes containing US$40,000. The incident was reported to the CONCACAF general secretary Chuck Blazer. The next day, footage from a private meeting between CFU officials was leaked to the public. This footage showed President Jack Warner informing the delegates who had received envelopes that the funds within were for their personal use, stating, "If you're pious, you should go to church." An investigation initiated by FIFA examined the actions of over 30 CFU representatives and resulted in the resignation of the CFU president, the suspension of the organization's vice-presidents and staff, and the resignation of several national football association staff.

== Competitions ==
The CFU Championship was a tournament for national teams in the region active between 1978 and 1988. It was sometimes referred to as the CFU Nations Cup. The Caribbean Cup was the international cup for the Caribbean between 1989 and 2017; the top 4 teams in the tournament used to qualify for the CONCACAF Gold Cup.

The Caribbean Club Championship was the championship for Caribbean club teams. The winner qualified for the CONCACAF Champions' Cup from 1997 and until 2008, and from 2008–09 until 2016–17, the top 3 clubs qualified for a preliminary round of the CONCACAF Champions League. Since 2017, the winner of the rebranded Caribbean Club Championship qualified for the knockout stage of the CONCACAF Champions League.

The CONCACAF Caribbean Cup is the latest announced regional competition.

Previously the CFU had organised a pan-Caribbean league, the Caribbean Professional Football League; it was active between 1992 and 1994.

=== Current title holders ===
Competition	Year	Champions	Title	Runners-up	Next edition	Dates
National teams
Caribbean Cup	2017	Curaçao	1st	Jamaica	Abolished	
U-23 Tournament	2015	Haiti	unknown	Cuba	TBD	
U-20 Tournament	2016	Haiti	unknown	Antigua and Barbuda	TBD	
U-17 Tournament	2016	Haiti	unknown	Cuba	TBD	
U-14 Tournament	2026	Haiti	—	Jamaica	2028	
Futsal Championship	2016	Cuba	unknown	Curaçao	TBD	
National teams (women)
Women's Caribbean Cup	2018	Trinidad and Tobago	unknown	unknown	TBD	
Women's Olympic Qualifying Tournament	2015	Trinidad and Tobago	unknown	Puerto Rico	TBD	
Women's U-20 Tournament	2017	Jamaica	unknown	Haiti	TBD	
Women's U-17 Tournament	2017	Haiti	unknown	Bermuda	TBD	
Girls U-14 Tournament	2025	Puerto Rico	—	Dominican Republic	TBD	
Club teams
CONCACAF Caribbean Cup	2025	(Jamaica) Mount Pleasant	1st	(Dominican Republic) O&M FC	2026	
CFU Club Shield	2026	(Jamaica) Mount Pleasant	1st	(Dominican Republic) Delfines del Este	2027	

^{1}No outright winner or champion emerges from this competition as it is not a competitive championship.

== Representative team ==
A Caribbean national team has played several exhibition fixtures. In 1987 a Caribbean XI entertained Brazilian São Paulo FC and a year later a 'Caribbean Selection' played against the national team of Trinidad and Tobago. Since the formation of the CFU, games have typically taken place in Port of Spain.

16 March 1987

Caribbean	0–2	(Brazil) São Paulo
	Report	Netto 72'; Pita 76'

National Stadium, Port of Spain
Attendance: 30,000
Referee: Albert Allman
21 July 1988

Caribbean	0–2	Trinidad and Tobago
	Report	Jones 73', 87'

National Stadium, Port of Spain
22 May 1990

Caribbean	2–2	(England) Crystal Palace
Lewis; Elliot-Allen	Report	Wright

National Stadium, Port of Spain

In August 1993, CFU President Jack Warner ruled out the possibility of merging the Caribbean nations into one national football team, similar to the West Indies cricket team. He said: "There seems to be some myth outside there that a Caribbean team is the answer to football in the region. I have never heard anything so ludicrous," said Warner, "If to reach a [FIFA] World Cup have to be considered by size, why haven't China ever made it. The simple fact is, we must take whatever seems to be our liabilities and make them our assets. Being small is never a liability in this sport".

== Presidents ==
There have been three presidents (and three acting presidents) of the CFU since its foundation:

- (Suriname) André Kamperveen (1978–1982)
- (Trinidad and Tobago) Jack Warner (1983–2011)
- (Barbados) Lisle Austin (2011) (acting president) (Note: Austin was suspended from his position after four days for attempting to overrule FIFA in the Barbadian civil court)
- (Haiti) Yves Jean-Bart (2011–2012) (acting president)
- (Antigua and Barbuda) Gordon Derrick (2012–2017) (Note: Derrick was banned by FIFA.)
- (Barbados) Randolph Harris (2017–2018) (acting president)
- (Barbados) Randolph Harris (2018–2025)
- (Saint Lucia) Lyndon Cooper (since 2025)

== General secretaries ==
There have been seven general secretaries of the CFU since its foundation:

- (Trinidad and Tobago) Jack Warner (1978–1982)
- (Trinidad and Tobago) Ivan Barrow (1983–1993)
- (Trinidad and Tobago) Harold Taylor (1993–2005)
- (Trinidad and Tobago) Kerry-Ann Alleyne (2006)
- (Trinidad and Tobago) Angenie Kanhai (2007–2011)
- (Anguilla) Damien Hughes (2012–2015)
- (Antigua and Barbuda) Neil Cochrane (2015–2018)

== Staff ==
Members of the CFU (orange), members of the CONCACAF (orange and camel).

As of 28 April 2026:

President	Lyndon Cooper (Saint Lucia)
Vice President	Michael Ricketts (Jamaica)
Vice President	John Krishnadath (Suriname)
Vice President	Jean Dartron (Guadeloupe)
Vice President	Ivan Rivera (Puerto Rico)
Executive Committee Members	Glen Etienne (Dominica)
Executive Committee Members	Anya James (Bahamas)
Executive Committee Members	Girdon Connor (Anguilla)
Executive Committee Members	Mark Wade (Bermuda)

== Member associations ==
=== Current members ===
Nation	Association	National team	Year joined the CFU	FIFA status	Island group	Geographical region
Anguilla	Anguilla Football Association	Anguilla	1996	Member	Leeward Islands	North America
Antigua and Barbuda	Antigua and Barbuda Football Association	Antigua and Barbuda	1978	Member	Leeward Islands	North America
Aruba	Arubaanse Voetbal Bond	Aruba	1988	Member	Leeward Antilles	South America
Bahamas	Bahamas Football Association	Bahamas	1978	Member	Lucayan Archipelago	North America
Barbados	Barbados Football Association	Barbados	1978	Member	Windward Islands	North America
Bermuda	Bermuda Football Association	Bermuda	1978	Member		North America
Bonaire	Bonaire Football Federation	Bonaire	2013	Non-member	Leeward Antilles	South America
British Virgin Islands	British Virgin Islands Football Association	British Virgin Islands	1996	Member	Leeward Islands	North America
Cayman Islands	Cayman Islands Football Association	Cayman Islands	1992	Member	Greater Antilles	North America
Cuba	Asociación de Fútbol de Cuba	Cuba	1978	Member	Greater Antilles	North America
Curaçao	Curaçao Football Federation	Curaçao	1978	Member	Leeward Antilles	South America
Dominica	Dominica Football Association	Dominica	1994	Member	Windward Islands	North America
Dominican Republic	Dominican Football Federation	Dominican Republic	1978	Member	Greater Antilles	North America
French Guiana	Ligue de football de la Guyane	French Guiana	1978	Non-member		South America
Grenada	Grenada Football Association	Grenada	1978	Member	Windward Islands	North America
Guadeloupe	Ligue Guadeloupéenne de Football	Guadeloupe	1978	Non-member	Leeward Islands	North America
Guyana	Guyana Football Federation	Guyana	1978	Member		South America
Haiti	Haitian Football Federation	Haiti	1978	Member	Greater Antilles	North America
Jamaica	Jamaica Football Federation	Jamaica	1978	Member	Greater Antilles	North America
Martinique	Ligue de football de la Martinique	Martinique	1978	Non-member	Windward Islands	North America
Montserrat	Montserrat Football Association	Montserrat	1996	Member	Leeward Islands	North America
Puerto Rico	Puerto Rican Football Federation	Puerto Rico	1978	Member	Greater Antilles	North America
Saint Kitts and Nevis	Saint Kitts and Nevis Football Association	Saint Kitts and Nevis	1992	Member	Leeward Islands	North America
Saint Lucia	Saint Lucia Football Association	Saint Lucia	1988	Member	Windward Islands	North America
Saint Martin	Comité de Football des Îles du Nord	Saint Martin		Non-member	Leeward Islands	North America
Saint Vincent and the Grenadines	Saint Vincent and the Grenadines Football Federation	Saint Vincent and the Grenadines	1988	Member	Windward Islands	North America
Sint Maarten	Sint Maarten Soccer Association	Sint Maarten		Non-member	Leeward Islands	North America
Suriname	Surinaamse Voetbal Bond	Suriname	1978	Member		South America
Trinidad and Tobago	Trinidad and Tobago Football Federation	Trinidad and Tobago	1978	Member	Windward Islands	North America
Turks and Caicos Islands	Turks and Caicos Islands Football Association	Turks and Caicos Islands	1998	Member	Lucayan Archipelago	North America
U.S. Virgin Islands	U.S. Virgin Islands Soccer Federation	United States Virgin Islands	1998	Member	Leeward Islands	North America

=== Former members ===
Association	Year	Note
Netherlands Antilles	1978–2010	Netherlands Antilles was a founding member of CFU, Aruba was split from Netherlands Antilles in 1986 and forming their National Team. In 2011, NAFU was succeeded by Federashon Futbol Korsou (FFK) following the dissolution of Netherlands Antilles

== See also ==
- CONCACAF
- UNCAF
- North American Football Union (NAFU)
- North American Football Confederation (NAFC)
- Confederacion Centroamericana y del Caribe de Futbol (CCCF)
