= Damien Hughes =

Damien E. Hughes
- Born: Damien Elroy Hughes; St. Kitts
- Education: Morehouse College and York University
- Known for: Tennis; Football

Damien Hughes is a former General Secretary of the Caribbean Football Union. He held the position between January 2012 and August 2015, he was replaced by Antiguan Neil Cochrane.

In October 2011, he was charged by FIFA Ethics Committee of violating the FIFA Code of Ethics but was cleared of any wrongdoing, making him one of only two persons ruled not to have committed any violations.

Hughes, on a tennis scholarship was captain of the Morehouse College tennis team and had been selected for the Eastern Caribbean Davis Cup team on several occasions.

He earned a degree in Political Science whilst at Morehouse College. He was the secretary and public relations officer of the OECS Tennis Players Union.

He earned master's degree in Environmental Studies with a focus on the "Development of Sustainable Tourism Policies in Caribbean Small Island Developing States" from York University in Canada. He served as Director of Franchise Operations at Caribbean Cable Communications in Anguilla until 2010.
