= Laudat =

Village in Saint George, Dominica

- Village
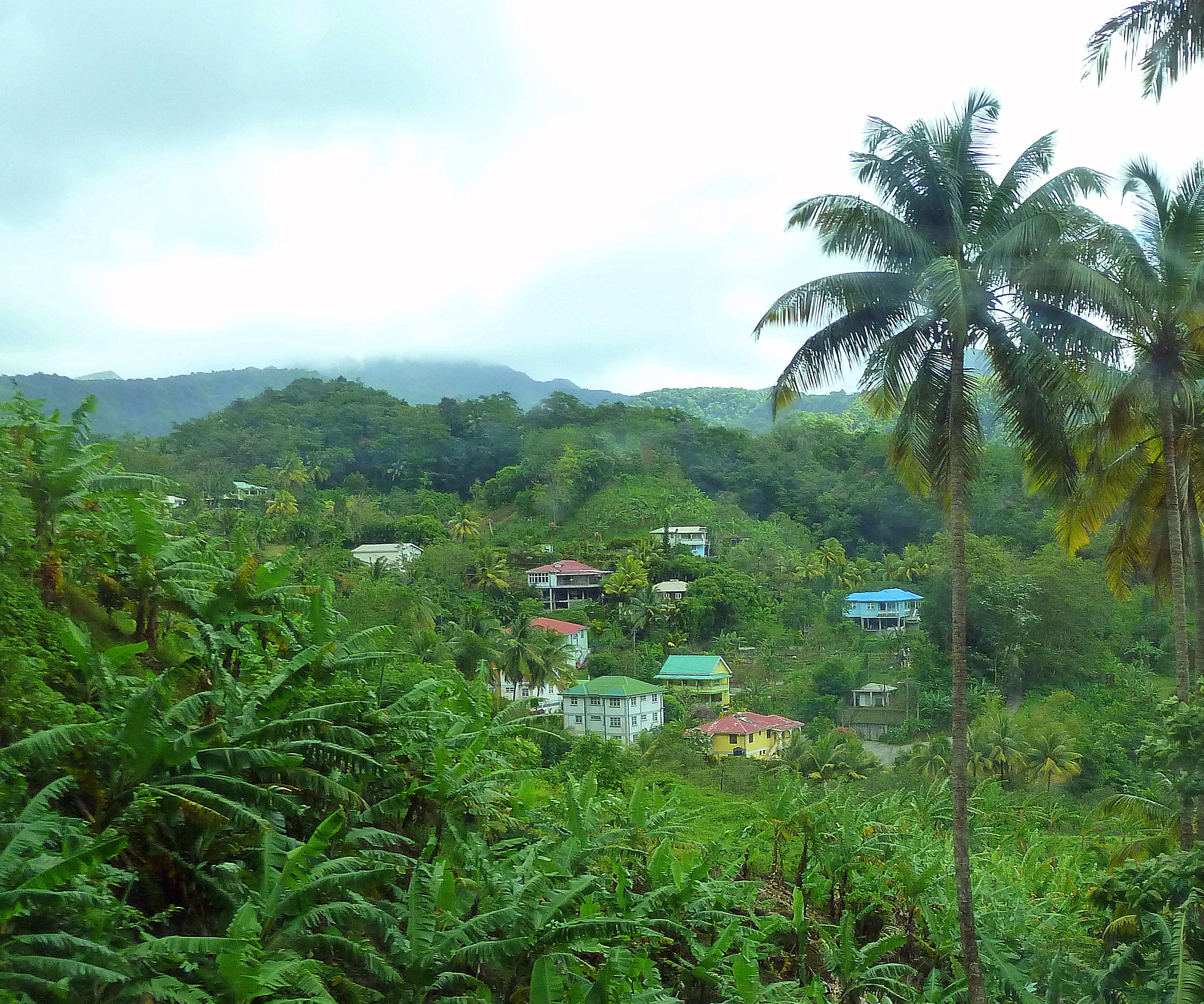

- Location within Dominica
- Country: Dominica
- Parish: Saint George

Laudat is a small village in the interior of Dominica, located between three mountains: Morne Watt, Morne Micotrine (Morne Mackak), and Morne Trois Pitons. With a population of just above 300 people, Laudat is referred to as a "gateway" because it is the sole entry point to many of the island's sights, including the Boiling Lake, Fresh Water Lake, and Titou Gorge. Perched about 1200 feet above sea level, Laudat has a cool climate and views of the Caribbean Sea. It is located approximately 20 minutes from the capital, Roseau, and is at the end of the road (there is no alternative but to turn around to exit). The road to Laudat used to be a hair-raising ride up the mountains, around blind hairpin turns with sharp drop-offs into the jungle canopy; however, the road has been improved and may be completed by the time of this writing.

Laudat has seen many changes over the past years, including the aerial tram (this tram closed in 2012) taking visitors from the village up into the high mountains--making possible what was previously a journey by foot. Titou Gorge was also altered over the last decade, and is now smaller and more developed. It is still a swimming place, and small waterfalls of hot and cold water stream into the gorge. There are some overnight accommodations available in the village. Laudat receives some of the highest rainfalls in the Caribbean, about 900 cm a year. The air is often misty and cool – a change from the heat of lower-lying areas.

== Development ==
The Dominica Geothermal Development Company has explored Laudat as a site for the production of geothermal energy since 2019.
