= South East FC =

- Full name: South East Football Club
- Nickname: South East
- Ground: Windsor Park, Roseau
- Capacity: 12,000
- League: Dominica Premier League
- 2026: 2nd

South East FC is a Dominican professional football club based in La Plaine. The club competes in the Dominica Premier Division League, the top tier of Dominica football. The club has won three league titles, coming in 2006–07, 2018–19 and 2020. In 2019, South East FC won their second domestic top-flight football league title at the Windsor Park in front of hundreds of spectators.

== Current roster ==
The current roster 2021/22: 2022 Caribbean Club Shield

Note: Flags indicate national team as defined under FIFA eligibility rules; some limited exceptions apply. Players may hold more than one non-FIFA nationality.

No.	Pos.	Nation	Player
1	GK	DMA	Dhante Challenger
6	GK	DMA	Scottie Phillip
18	GK	DMA	Randel Prince
-	DF	DMA	Randel Prince
3	DF	DMA	Kimon Cuffy
10	DF	DMA	Davorn George
20	DF	DMA	Darron Lazare
12	DF	DMA	Deikel Prince
14	MF	DMA	Yannick George
15	MF	DMA	Troy Lewis
17	MF	DMA	Ervince Lockhart
19	MF	DMA	Coann Lockhart

No.	Pos.	Nation	Player
21	MF	DMA	Joslyn Prince
9	MF	DMA	Javid George
11	MF	DMA	Sidney Lockhart
-	MF	DMA	Eli Vigilante
7	FW	DMA	Rai Phillip
13	FW	DMA	Adriel Lawrence

== Honors ==
- Dominica Premier League
  - Champions (3): 2007, 2019, 2020
