= Exodus FC =

- Full name: Exodus Football Club
- Ground: Windsor Park Cricket Stadium, Roseau, Dominica
- Capacity: 12,000
- League: Dominica Premier League

Exodus FC is a Dominica professional football club based in Roseau founded in 2010. The club competes in the Dominica Premier League, the top tier of Dominica football.

== Honors ==
- Dominican Division One
  - 1 (2011–12)
- Dominica Premier League
  - 1 (2014–15)

== Stadium ==
The team plays its home matches at the 12,000 capacity Windsor Park Cricket Stadium.

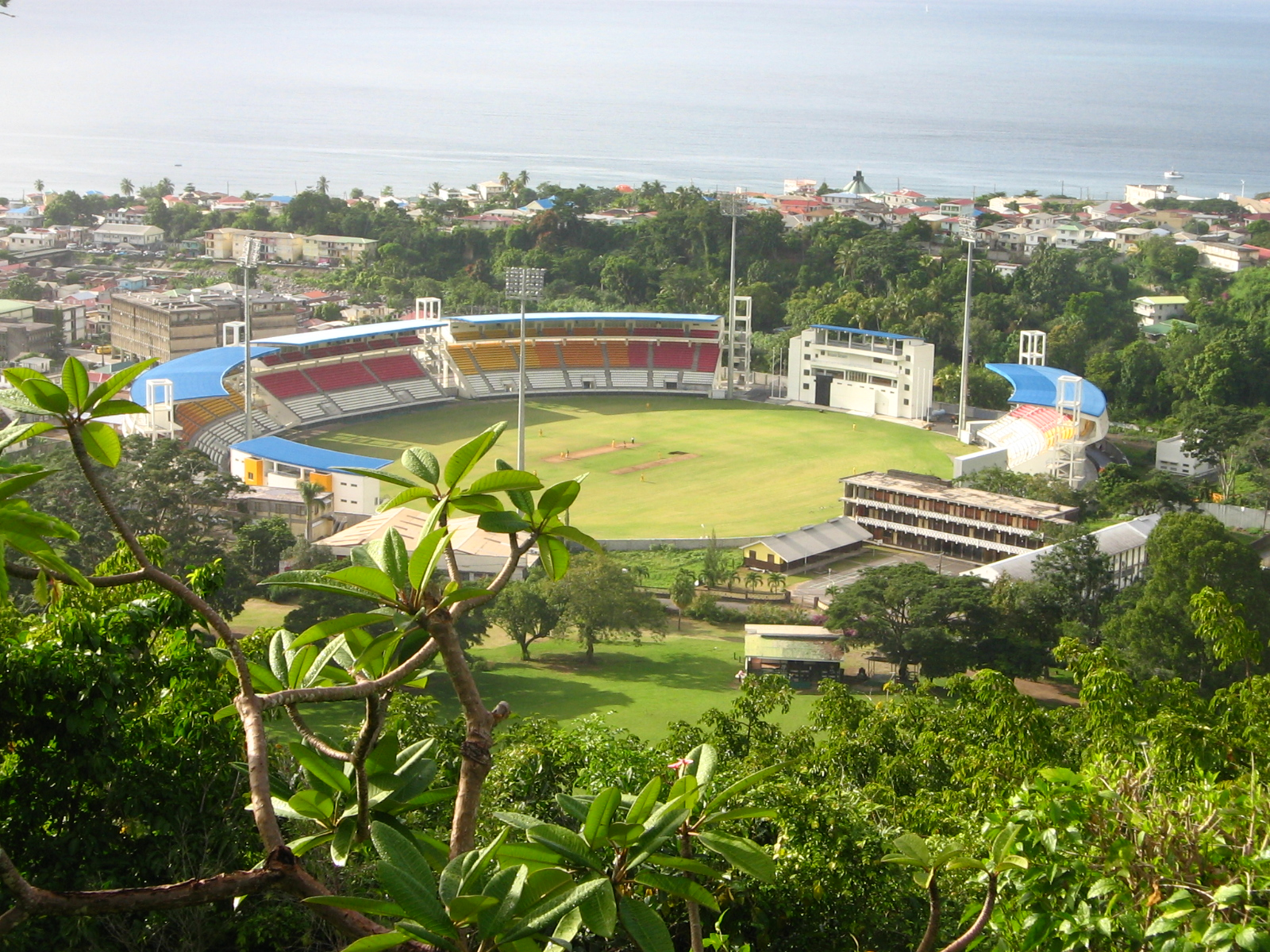
