= Dublanc =

- Village
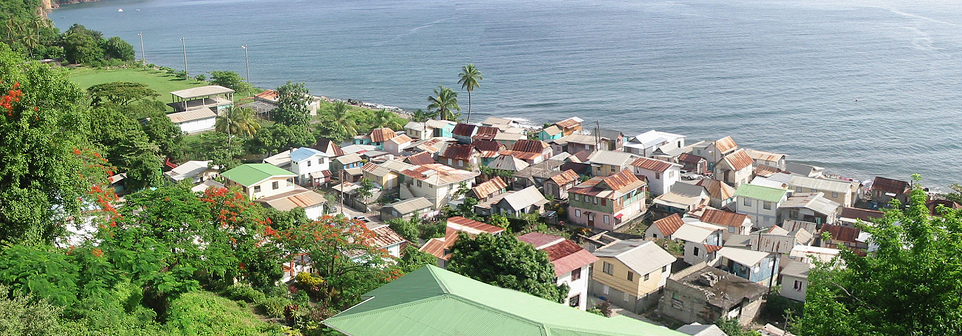
- Dublanc - Dominica

- Location within Dominica
- Coordinates: 15°30′52″N 61°28′08″W
- Country: Dominica
- Parish: Saint Peter
- Elevation: 27 ft (8.2 m)

Population (2001)
  - Total: 423

Dublanc is a village in Saint Peter parish on the west coast of Dominica between the town of Portsmouth and the village of Bioche. It sits on a low hillside at an elevation of 27. As of 2001 it had a population of 423.

The Dublanc river, which rises on the flanks of Morne Diablotin (the tallest mountain in Dominica), cuts through the village just before entering the Caribbean Sea.

== Industry ==
Dublanc is a rural village; many residents farm and fish for their livelihood.

== Amenities ==
- Catholic church
- Seventh-Day Adventist Church
- Pre-School
- Primary School

== Sports ==
The village continues to do well in sporting events in Dominica, mainly football and cricket.

== Some Past Residents ==
Irvine Shillingford, a local cricketer
