= Football in Dominica =

- Country: Dominica
- Governing body: Dominica Football Association
- National team: men's national team

Club competitions
- Dominica Championship

International competitions
- Champions League; FIFA Club World Cup; FIFA World Cup(National Team); CONCACAF Gold Cup(National Team)

The sport of association football in the country of Dominica is run by the Dominica Football Association. The association administers the national football team, as well as the Dominica Championship. Football is a popular sport in the country, but cricket is the most popular sport in Dominica.

== National football stadium ==
Stadium	Capacity	City
Windsor Park	12,000	Roseau
