= East Central FC =

- Full name: East Central Football Club
- Founded: 2011; 15 years ago
- Ground: Castle Bruce Playing Field, Castle Bruce
- League: Dominica Premier League
- 2025: 9th

East Central FC is a Dominican professional association football club from Castle Bruce that currently plays in the Dominica Premier League.

== History ==
The club was founded in 2011 and combines players from the communities of Castle Bruce, Good Hope, Saint Sauveur, and Petite Soufriere. It has never won the Premier League title through the 2021 season.
