= Dublanc FC =

- Full name: Dublanc Football Club
- Nickname: Sharks
- Founded: 1993
- Ground: DFA Technical Center Stadium
- Capacity: 2,000
- League: Dominica Premier League
- 2026: 1st, Champions

Dublanc Football Club (previously known as Dublanc Sports Club and Dublanc Strikers Sports Club) is a Dominica amateur football club based in Dublanc. The club competes in the Dominica Premier League, the top tier of Dominica football.

== Stadiums ==
Dublanc has its own sports ground, the Dublanc Playing Field, which hosts football of various levels including the Premiere League, Women's League, and youth. Like other Premiere League clubs, Dublanc FC also plays matches at the DFA Technical Center Stadium.

== Honors ==
- Dominica Premier League
  - Champions (7): 2005, 2016, 2017, 2023, 2024, 2025, 2026
- Dominica Knock-Out Tournament (3):
  - 2024, 2025, 2026
- Nations Cup:
  - 2019

== International competition ==
Results list Dublanc FC's goal tally first.

| Competition | Round | Club | Score |
|---|---|---|---|
| 2024 CFU Club Shield | Preliminary Round | (Collectivity of Saint Martin) Junior Stars | 2–0 |
| 2024 CFU Club Shield | Round of 16 | (Cayman Islands) Scholars International | 3–0 |
| 2024 CFU Club Shield | Quarter-Finals | (Saint Kitts and Nevis) Village Superstars | 2–2 |
| 2024 CFU Club Shield | Semi-Finals | (Antigua and Barbuda) Grenades | 0–1 |
| 2024 CFU Club Shield | Third-Place Match | (Dominican Republic) Atlético Pantoja | 1–1 |
| 2025 CFU Club Shield | Group Stage | (Jamaica) Arnett Gardens | 0–4 |
| 2025 CFU Club Shield | Group Stage | (Anguilla) Doc's United | 2–1 |
| 2026 CFU Club Shield | First Round | (Grenada) St. John's Sports | 1–3 |
