= Bath Estate FC =

Bath Estate
- Full name: Bath Estate Football Club
- Nickname: Bath Estate
- Founded: 1982; 44 years ago
- Ground: Bath Estate Playing Field
- Manager: Micheal Joseph
- League: Dominica Premier League
- 2024: 9th of 10

Bath Estate Football Club is a Dominican professional football club based in Roseau. The club competes in the Dominica Premier League, the top tier of Dominica football.

The club was the 2010 defending champions.
