= Dominica First Division =

- Country: Dominica
- Confederation: CONCACAF
- Number of clubs: 30
- Level on pyramid: 2
- Promotion to: Dominica Premier League

The Dominica First Division is the second-tier of football in Dominica. The top two teams each season are promoted to the Dominica Premier League. The league is split into 3 groups each with 10 teams.

== Clubs ==
The following teams are known participants for the 2017–18 season:

- Kensbro
- Wacky Rollers
