= Dominica Premier League =

Dominica association football league

- Founded: 1950; 76 years ago
- Country: Dominica
- Confederation: CONCACAF
- Number of clubs: 10
- Level on pyramid: 1
- Relegation to: Dominica First Division
- League cup: CFU Club Shield
- Current champions: Dublanc (2026)
- Most championships: Harlem United (20)
- Current: 2026 Dominica Premier League

The Dominica Premier League is the top division for association football in Dominica, it was created in 1970. Ten clubs participate in the league. Starting in 2005, the winner and runners-up can qualify for the CONCACAF Champions Cup from the first round of the CFU Club Championship. The clubs play an 18-match league (home and away against the other 9 teams). Top club is declared the Dominica Champion and the 10th placed is relegated to Dominica First Division.

Some matches are played at the 12,000-capacity Windsor Park while most are now played at the 2,000-capacity DFA Technical Center Stadium. League games often take place in front of dozens of spectators.

== Clubs ==
Locations of the 2019–20 Dominica Premier League teams
- Bath Estate (Roseau)
- Dublanc FC (Dublanc)
- East Central (Castle Bruce)
- Exodus (Saint Joseph)
- Harlem United (Newtown)
- Mahaut Soca Strikers (Mahaut)
- Portsmouth Bombers (Portsmouth)
- Pointe Michel (Pointe Michel)
- South East (La Plaine)
- WE United (Castle Bruce)

== Previous winners ==
Winners so far:

- 1950–1957: unknown
- 1958: Combermere (Roseau)
- 1959: Arsenal
- 1960: unknown
- 1961: Combermere (Roseau)
- 1962: Arsenal
- 1963: LIAT (Roseau)
- 1964: Thunderbirds (Newtown)
- 1965: Spartans (Laudat)
- 1966: Domfruit Rovers (Newtown)
- 1967: Domfruit Rovers (Newtown)
- 1968: Cedar United (Newtown)
- 1969: Spartans (Laudat)
- 1970: Harlem Rovers (Newtown)
- 1971: Celtic United (Roseau)
- 1972: Harlem Rovers (Newtown)
- 1973: Harlem Rovers (Newtown)
- 1974: Harlem Rovers (Newtown)
- 1975: abandoned
- 1976: Kensborough United (Roseau)
- 1977: Kensborough United (Roseau)
- 1978: Kensborough United (Roseau)
- 1979: Spartans (Laudat)
- 1980: unknown
- 1981: Harlem Bombers (Newtown)
- 1982: unknown
- 1983: Harlem Bombers (Newtown)
- 1984: unknown
- 1985: Kensborough United (Roseau) & Harlem Bombers (Newtown) (shared)
- 1986: Heineken Saints (Goodwill)
- 1987: Guinness Stars (Roseau)
- 1988: Kensborough United (Roseau)
- 1989: Harlem Bombers (Newtown)
- 1990: unknown
- 1991: C&BM Potters (Roseau)
- 1992: Harlem Bombers (Newtown)
- 1993: Harlem Bombers (Newtown)
- 1994: Harlem Bombers (Newtown)
- 1995: Harlem Bombers (Newtown)
- 1996: Black Rocks (Roseau)
- 1997: Harlem Bombers (Newtown)
- 1998: ACS Zebbians (Goodwill)
- 1999: Harlem Bombers (Newtown)
- 2000: Harlem Bombers (Newtown)
- 2001: Harlem Bombers (Newtown)
- 2002: Kubuli All Stars (Saint Joseph)
- 2003: Harlem United (Newtown)
- 2004: Harlem United (Newtown)
- 2005: Dublanc Strikers (Dublanc)
- 2006: Harlem United (Newtown)
- 2007: Sagicor South East United (La Plaine)
- 2008: Centre Bath Estate (Roseau)
- 2009: Centre Bath Estate (Roseau)
- 2010: Centre Bath Estate (Roseau)
- 2011–12: Harlem United (Newtown)
- 2012–13: Centre Bath Estate (Roseau)
- 2013–14: Northern Bombers (Portsmouth)
- 2014–15: Exodus (Saint Joseph)
- 2015–16: Dublanc (Dublanc)
- 2016–17: Dublanc (Dublanc)
- 2017–18: abandoned
- 2018–19: South East (La Plaine)
- 2020: South East (La Plaine)
- 2021: abandoned
- 2022: not held
- 2023: Dublanc (Dublanc)
- 2024: Dublanc (Dublanc)
- 2025: Dublanc (Dublanc)
- 2026: Dublanc (Dublanc)

== Performance by club ==
Club	City	Titles	Last title
Harlem United	Newtown	20	2011–12
Dublanc	Dublanc	7	2026
Kensborough United	Roseau	5	1988
Cedar United	Newtown	4	1968
Bath Estate	Roseau	4	2012–13
South East	La Plaine	4	2020
Spartans	Laudat	4	1979
Combermere	Roseau	3	1963
Arsenal	?	2	1962
Black Rocks	Roseau	1	1996
C&BM Potters	Pottersville	1	1991
Celtic United	Roseau	1	1971
Exodus	Saint Joseph	1	2014–15
Guinness Stars	Roseau	1	1987
Heineken Saints	Goodwill	1	1986
Kubuli All Stars	Saint Joseph	1	2002
Northern Bombers	Portsmouth	1	2013–14
ACS Zebbians	Goodwill	1	1998

== Top goalscorers ==
Season	Player	Team	Goals
2023	(Dominica) Audel Laville	Dublanc	21
2024	(Dominica) Travist Joseph	Dublanc	28
2025	(Dominica) Audel Laville	Dublanc	22

== Women's League ==
=== Top goalscorers ===
Season	Player	Team	Goals
2025	(Dominica) Le-Myah Forde	Portsmouth Bombers	15
