= Harlem United FC =

Dominican association football club

- Full name: Harlem United Football Club
- Nickname: United Lions
- Founded: 1970; 56 years ago
- Ground: Windsor Park Cricket Stadium
- Capacity: 12,000
- League: Dominica Premier League
- 2026: 7th

Harlem United FC is a Dominican professional football club based in Newtown. The club competes in the Dominica Premier League, the top tier of Dominica football.

== History ==
Founded in 1970, the Harlem United is the most successful club in Dominica, winning the Premier Division League a record 20 times.

== Honors ==
- Dominica Championship (20):
  - 1970, 1972, 1973, 1974, 1981, 1983, 1985, 1989, 1992, 1993, 1994, 1995, 1997, 1999, 2000, 2001, 2003, 2004, 2006, 2011–12
- Dominica Knock-Out Tournament (13):
  - 1970, 1971, 1973, 1974, 1976, 1978, 1980, 1984, 1992, 1994, 1997, 2003, 2004
- DFA Recovery Cup:
  - 2020
