= Dominica Football Association =

Governing body of football in Dominica

CONCACAF
- Founded: 1970
- Headquarters: Roseau, Dominica
- FIFA affiliation: 1994
- CONCACAF affiliation: 1990 (Associate member), 1994
- President: Glen Etienne
- Website: www.dominicafa.com

The Dominica Football Association is the governing body of football in Dominica.

The Dominica national football team is the national team of Dominica and is controlled by the Dominica Football Association. The national league of Dominica is the Dominica Championship.

In June 2012, the President of the DFA was removed from his role by the association's members until the end of his term in 2015 for his part in the Caribbean Football Union corruption scandal.

== Association staff ==
Name	Position	Source
(Dominica) Glen Etienne	President	
(Dominica) Saraphine Stanton	Vice President	
(Dominica) Jarsmine Vidal-Matthew	General Secretary	
(Dominica) John Joseph	Treasurer	
(Dominica) Jerome Bardouille	Technical Director	
(Dominica) Ellington Sabin	Team Coach (Men's)	
(Dominica) Ronnie Gustave	Team Coach (Women's)	
n/a	Media/Communications Manager	
n/a	Futsal Coordinator	
(Dominica) Kurt Christmas	Chairperson of the Referees Committee	
(Dominica) Nehron Williams	Head/Director of the Referees Department	
(Dominica) Nehron Williams	Referee Coordinator	
