= Portsmouth Bombers FC =

- Full name: Portsmouth Bombers Football Club
- Nicknames: Northern Bombers, Bombers
- Ground: Benjamin's Park, Portsmouth, Dominica
- League: Dominica Premier League
- 2026: 4th

Portsmouth Bombers Football Club is a Dominican professional football club representing Portsmouth, Dominica (on the northern side of the country, hence their previous name Northern Bombers). The club competes in the Dominica Premier League, the top tier of Dominica football.

== History ==
It was founded on July 10, 1993, in Portsmouth, Dominica, as Portsmouth Bombers FC, and has changed its name several times, including:

- 1993-2005: Portsmouth Bombers FC
- 2005-06: Indian River Inn Bombers FC
- 2006-09: Fone Shack Bombers FC
- 2009-11: NAGICO Bombers FC
- 2011-present: Northern Concrete & Steel Bombers

The club won its first Dominica Football Championship title in the 2013/14 season, ultimately beating Exodus FC in the standings.

== Honours ==
- Dominica Premier League
  - 1 (2013–14)
