= Windsor Park (Dominica) =

Stadium in Dominica

Coordinates: 15°18′7″N 61°23′3″W

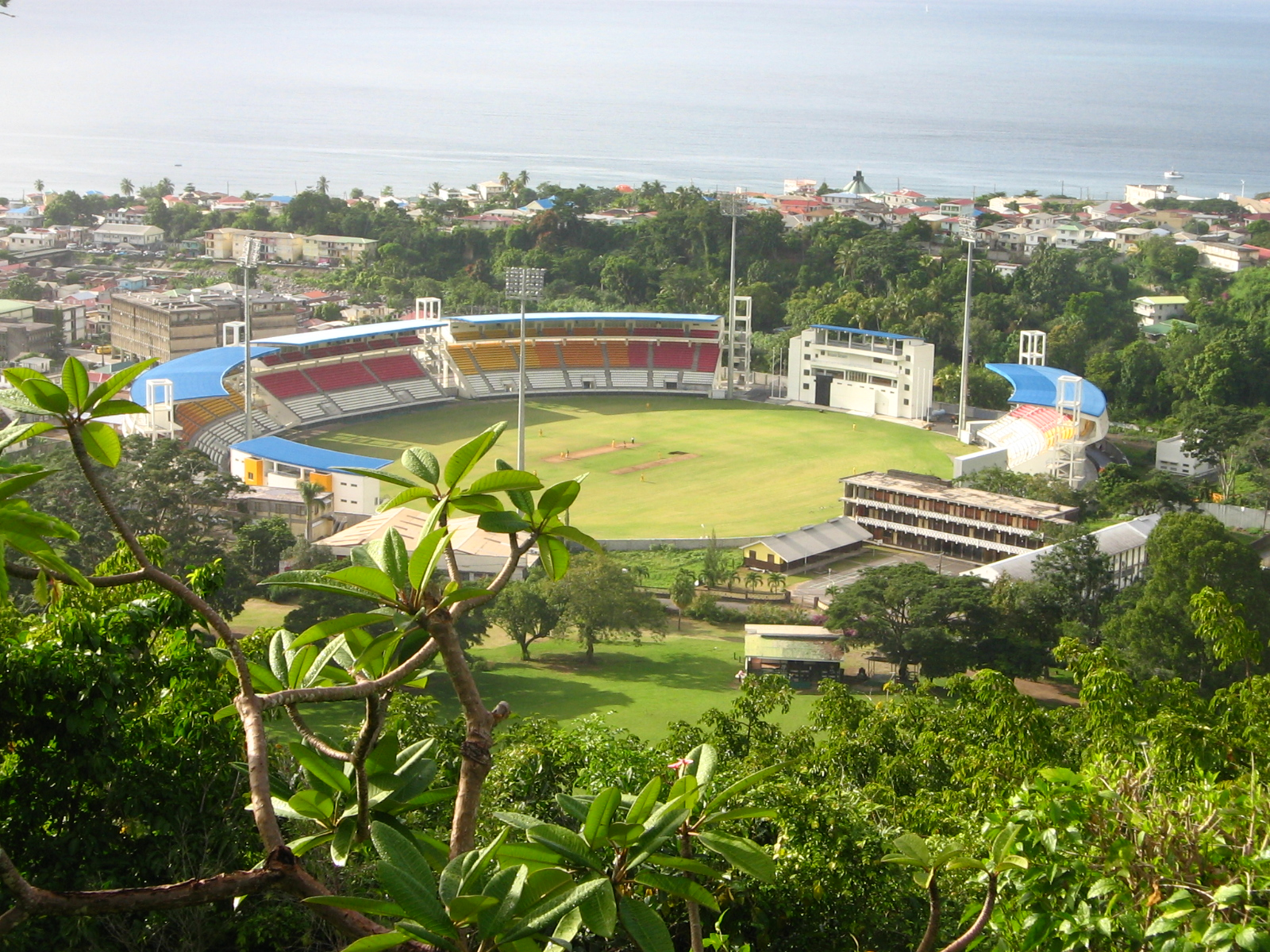
- Interactive map of Windsor Park

Ground information
- Location: Roseau, Dominica
- Country: West Indies
- Establishment: 24 October 2007
- Capacity: 12,000
- Owner: Commonwealth of Dominica
- Tenants: Exodus FC; West Indies cricket team Dominica national football team Windward Islands cricket team
- End names
- River End; Botanical Gardens End

International information
- First men's Test: 6–10 July 2011: West Indies v India
- Last men's Test: 12–14 July 2023: West Indies v India
- First men's ODI: 26 July 2009: West Indies v Bangladesh
- Last men's ODI: 30 May 2010: West Indies v South Africa
- First men's T20I: 5 July 2014: West Indies v New Zealand
- Last men's T20I: 3 July 2022: West Indies v Bangladesh
- First women's ODI: 12 January 2013: West Indies v South Africa
- Last women's ODI: 15 January 2013: West Indies v South Africa
- First women's T20I: 22 February 2012: West Indies v India
- Last women's T20I: 23 February 2012: West Indies v India

Team information
Windward Islands cricket team	(2007–present)
- As of 18 July 2023; Source: ESPNcricinfo

Windsor Park is a multi-purpose stadium in Roseau in Dominica. It serves as the country's national stadium and is used mostly for cricket and association football matches. Other uses have included the World Creole Music Festival, the Finals of the Calypso Competition and the Miss Dominica pageant.

The stadium is of International Cricket Council (ICC) international standard with facilities featuring 12,000 seats, private boxes, a media centre, practice nets, a players' personality complex, digital score boards and five cricket pitches.

== History ==
The ground was named after Windsor, England, and is situated on the eastern side of Roseau. It was levelled out of a rubbish dump previously known as Cow Town. It was a popular venue for sports of all kinds, carnival activities, horse and donkey racing, state parades and played a central role in island life. In 1999 a national stadium was planned for the site, but after demolishing all of the existing stands and adjoining buildings, including a former school that had once been wards of the Roseau Hospital, the project was abandoned and the site was deserted until 2005.

New work on the stadium started on 23 March 2005, on the first anniversary of the establishment of diplomatic relations between the People's Republic of China and Dominica. The stadium is one of the 'Four Pillar Projects' promised by China to Dominica as a result of a memorandum of understanding during the establishment of ties between Dominica and China. The stadium is viewed as a gift at a cost of EC$33 million (US$17 million, €12 million) from the government of the People's Republic of China to the government and people of Dominica.

On 7 February 2007, work on the Windsor Park Stadium was completed. Work on the facilities to accompany the stadium resulted in the stadium not being used before May 2007, therefore missing any activities relating to Cricket World Cup 2007, held in the Caribbean. The handing-over ceremony of the stadium from Chinese officials to Dominica took place on 23 March, marking the third year of diplomatic ties with the People's Republic. On 24 October 2007 the Windsor Park National Sport Stadium was official opened with a grand ceremony. The 11th Annual World Creole Music Festival (WCMF) was held on 25–27 October as the stadium's first official activity.

== Activities ==
On 6 February 2008, the Dominica national football team played their first 2010 World Cup qualifying match against Barbados in front of 4,200 spectators at Windsor Park.

Dominica hosted its first two One Day International cricket matches at Windsor Park Stadium, between West Indies and Bangladesh. The games were played on 26 July and 28 July in 2009.

Windsor Park hosted its first Test match between West Indies and India from 6–10 July 2011.

== List of five-wicket hauls ==
=== Tests ===
11 five-wicket hauls in Test matches have been taken at the venue.

No.	Bowler	Date	Team	Opposing team	Inn	Overs	Runs	Wkts	Econ	Result
1	Ishant Sharma	6 July 2011	India	West Indies	1	21.3	77	5	3.58	Drawn
2	Fidel Edwards	6 July 2011	West Indies	India	2	28.2	103	5	3.63	Drawn
3	Shane Shillingford	23 April 2012	West Indies	Australia	1	42.5	119	6	2.77	Lost
4	Michael Clarke	23 April 2012	Australia	West Indies	4	23	86	5	3.73	Won
5	Shane Shillingford	20 March 2013	West Indies	Zimbabwe	1	21.5	59	5	2.7	Won
6	Shane Shillingford	20 March 2013	West Indies	Zimbabwe	3	15	34	5	2.26	Won
7	Devendra Bishoo	3 June 2015	West Indies	Australia	2	33	80	6	2.42	Lost
8	Mohammad Abbas	10 May 2017	Pakistan	West Indies	2	25	46	5	1.84	Won
9	Yasir Shah	10 May 2017	Pakistan	West Indies	4	37	92	5	2.48	Won
10	Ravichandran Ashwin	12 July 2023	India	West Indies	1	24.3	60	5	2.44	Won
11	Ravichandran Ashwin	12 July 2023	India	West Indies	3	21.3	71	7	3.30	Won

=== One Day Internationals ===
One five-wicket haul in One Day Internationals has been taken at the venue.

No.	Bowler	Date	Team	Opposing team	Inn	Overs	Runs	Wkts	Econ	Result
1	Kemar Roach	26 July 2009	West Indies	Bangladesh	1	10	44	5	4.40	Lost

== See also ==
- List of Test cricket grounds
