= Barbados national football team results (2000–2019) =

This article provides details of international football games played by the Barbados national football team from 2000 to 2019.

== Results (2000s) ==
Win Draw Loss

=== 2000 ===
17 February Friendly	Barbados	1–0	Saint Kitts and Nevis	St. Michael, Barbados
	Riley 44'	Report		Stadium: Barbados National Stadium

29 February Friendly	Barbados	2–2	Antigua and Barbuda	St. Michael, Barbados
	Riley 85' (pen.); Forde 89'	Report		Stadium: Barbados National Stadium

5 March 2002 FIFA World Cup qualification	Barbados	2–2	Grenada	St. Michael, Barbados
	Alexander 31', 47'	Report	75', 77' Modeste	Stadium: Barbados National Stadium; Attendance: 4,500; Referee: Carlton Dupont (St. Kitts and Nevis)

18 March 2002 FIFA World Cup qualification	Grenada	2–3 a.e.t	Barbados	St. George's, Grenada
	Babb 45+2' (o.g.); Fletcher 60'	Report	20' Cox; 36' Forde; 96' Riley	Stadium: National Cricket Stadium; Attendance: 3,000; Referee: Ramesh Ramdhan (Trinidad and Tobago)

1 April 2002 FIFA World Cup qualification	Aruba	1–3	Barbados	Oranjestad, Aruba
	Gross 89'	Report	5' Riley; 23', 85' Alexander	Stadium: Trinidad Stadium; Attendance: 1,200; Referee: Timothy Hazelwood (St. Vincent and the Grenadines)

16 April 2002 FIFA World Cup qualification	Barbados	4–0	Aruba	St. Michael, Barbados
	Alexander 45', 67'; Goodridge 47'; Riley 70'	Report		Stadium: Barbados National Stadium; Attendance: 1,755; Referee: Ramesh Ramdhan (Trinidad and Tobago)

7 May 2002 FIFA World Cup qualification	Cuba	1–1	Barbados	Havana, Cuba
	Moré 45'	Report	16' Riley	Stadium: Estadio Pedro Marrero; Attendance: 5,000; Referee: Samuel Richard Contreras (Republican Dominic)

21 May 2002 FIFA World Cup qualification	Barbados	1–1 (5-4 p)	Cuba	St. Michael, Barbados
	Moré 73'	Report	74' (o.g.) Cruzata	Stadium: Barbados National Stadium; Attendance: 7,000; Referee: Noel Bynoe (Trinidad and Tobago)

10 June Friendly	Saint Vincent and the Grenadines	1–0	Barbados	Arnos Vale, St. Vincent and the Grenadines
		Report		Stadium: Arnos Vale Stadium

29 June Friendly	Barbados	0–0	Trinidad and Tobago	St. Michael, Barbados
		Report		Stadium: Barbados National Stadium; Attendance: 3,500; Referee: Sherlock Wall (Barbados)

5 July Friendly	Jamaica	5–0	Barbados	Kingston, Jamaica
	Johnson 6'; Lowe 26', 65'; Boyd 70'; Marshall 83'	Report		Stadium: Independence Park; Attendance: 18,000

16 July 2002 FIFA World Cup qualification	Barbados	2–1	Costa Rica	St. Michael, Barbados
	Riley 49'; Forde 84'	Report	48' Madrigal	Stadium: Barbados National Stadium; Attendance: 8,000; Referee: Mauricio Navarro (Canada)

22 July 2002 FIFA World Cup qualification	Guatemala	2–0	Barbados	Quetzaltenango, Guatemala
	Ruiz 2'; García 82'	Report		Stadium: Estadio Mario Camposeco; Attendance: 5,000; Referee: Mike Seifert (Canada)

16 August 2002 FIFA World Cup qualification	United States	7–0	Barbados	Boston, United States
	Pope 14'; McBride 28'; Moore 45', 80'; O'Brien 46'; Ramos 72'; Stewart 73'	Report		Stadium: Foxboro Stadium; Attendance: 18,334; Referee: José Pineda Fernández (Honduras)

3 September 2002 FIFA World Cup qualification	Costa Rica	3–0	Barbados	San José, Costa Rica
	Soto 35'; Fonseca 40'; Medford 54'	Report		Stadium: Estadio Ricardo Saprissa; Attendance: 17,000; Referee: Manlio Brizio Carter (Mexico)

8 October 2002 FIFA World Cup qualification	Barbados	1–3	Guatemala	St. Michael, Barbados
	Riley 25'	Report	2' García; 9' Ruiz; 85' Acevedo	Stadium: Barbados National Stadium; Attendance: 3,800; Referee: Felipe de Jesús Ramos Rizo (Mexico)

15 November 2002 FIFA World Cup qualification	Barbados	0–4	United States	St. Michael, Barbados
		Report	63' Mathis; 73' Stewart; 77' Jones; 90+2' Razov	Stadium: Barbados National Stadium; Attendance: 4,000; Referee: Noel Bynoe (Trinidad and Tobago)

=== 2001 ===
23 March Friendly	Guyana	2–2	Barbados	Georgetown, Guyana
	Codrington; Hernández	Report	Gale; DeFreitas

25 March Friendly	Guyana	1–2	Barbados	Georgetown, Guyana
	Scott 85'	Report	25' DeFreitas; 86' Riley

4 April 2001 Caribbean Cup qualification	Barbados	2–1	Grenada	Paramaribo, Suriname
	Goodridge 12'; Forde 85'	Report	52' Charles	Stadium: Andre Kamperveen Stadion

6 April 2001 Caribbean Cup qualification	Suriname	2–2	Barbados	Paramaribo, Suriname
	Vlijter 8'; Feller 54'	Report	41', 89' Stoute	Stadium: Andre Kamperveen Stadion

8 April 2001 Caribbean Cup qualification	Barbados	5–2	Aruba	Paramaribo, Suriname
	Riley 4'; Stoute 11'; Forde 14'; Goodridge 36'; DeFreitas 64'	Report	6' Filomena; 73' Gross	Stadium: Andre Kamperveen Stadion

15 May 2001 Caribbean Cup	Trinidad and Tobago	5–0	Barbados	Malabar, Trinidad and Tobago
	John 20', 50'; Dwarika 40'; Carrington 75'; Rahim 79'	Report		Stadium: Larry Gomes Stadium; Attendance: 6,000; Referee: Harlem Villar Toro (Aruba)

17 May 2001 Caribbean Cup	Martinique	3–1	Barbados	Port of Spain, Trinidad and Tobago
	Rano 22', 56'; Clément 79'	Report	29' (pen.) Riley	Stadium: Hasely Crawford Stadium; Attendance: 5,500; Referee: John Callendar (Guyana)

19 May 2001 Caribbean Cup	Jamaica	2–1	Barbados	Port of Spain, Trinidad and Tobago
	Harris 14' (pen.); Taylor 27'	Report	29' Riley	Stadium: Hasely Crawford Stadium; Attendance: 2,000; Referee: John Callendar (Guyana)

=== 2002 ===
25 July Friendly	Barbados	0–0	Trinidad and Tobago	Basseterre, St. Kitts and Nevis
		Report		Stadium: Warner Park; Attendance: 700

27 July Friendly	Saint Kitts and Nevis	3–0	Barbados	Basseterre, St. Kitts and Nevis
	Isaac; Francis; Gumbs	Report		Stadium: Warner Park

6 October Friendly	Barbados	3–2	Saint Lucia	St. Michael, Barbados
	Burrowes; Forde 85'	Report	Valencius; Xavier	Stadium: Barbados National Stadium

9 November 2003 CONCACAF Gold Cup qualification	Barbados	1–1	Jamaica	St. George's, Grenada
	Goodridge 87'	Report	90' Hall	Stadium: National Cricket Stadium; Attendance: 3,000; Referee: Robin Murray (Trinidad and Tobago)

11 November 2003 CONCACAF Gold Cup qualification	Grenada	0–2	Barbados	St. George's, Grenada
		Report	66' Lucas; 90' Goodridge	Stadium: National Cricket Stadium; Attendance: 5,000; Referee: Robin Murray (Trinidad and Tobago)

13 November 2003 CONCACAF Gold Cup qualification	Barbados	0–1	Guadeloupe	St. George's, Grenada
		Report	83' (pen.) Vertot	Stadium: National Cricket Stadium; Attendance: 3,250; Referee: Neal Brizan (Trinidad and Tobago)

=== 2003 ===
12 January Friendly	Barbados	1–0	Jamaica	St. Michael, Barbados
	Williams 61'	Report		Stadium: Barbados National Stadium; Attendance: 7,500

26 January Friendly	Barbados	0–0	Finland	St. Michael, Barbados
		Report		Stadium: Barbados National Stadium; Referee: Noel Bynoe (Trinidad and Tobago)

12 February Friendly	Barbados	3–3	Martinique	St. Michael, Barbados
	Lucas 5'; Williams 9'; Straker 48'	Report	6' Reyal; 55', 71' Girier-Dufournier	Stadium: Barbados National Stadium

22 March Friendly	Jamaica	2–1	Barbados	Kingston, Jamaica
	Taylor 20'; Daley 78'	Report	59' Cox	Stadium: Independence Park; Referee: Godfrey Bowen (Cayman Islands)

26 December Friendly	Bermuda	1–2	Barbados	Devonshire Parish, Bermuda
	Nusum 79'	Report	39', 43' Lovell	Stadium: Bermuda National Stadium; Referee: Anthony Mouchette (Bermuda)

=== 2004 ===
1 January Friendly	Bermuda	0–4	Barbados	Devonshire Parish, Bermuda
		Report	6' Parris; 51' Riley; 74', 76' Goodridge	Stadium: Bermuda National Stadium; Referee: Lyndon Raynor (Bermuda)

11 January Friendly	Barbados	2–0	Grenada	St. Michael, Barbados
	Forde 35'; Riley 58'	Report		Stadium: Barbados National Stadium; Attendance: 2,000; Referee: Royon Small (Bermuda)

18 January Friendly	Barbados	0–1	Canada	St. Michael, Barbados
		Report	9' Corazzin	Stadium: Barbados National Stadium; Referee: Mark Forde (Bermuda)

31 January Friendly	Grenada	0–1	Barbados	St. George's, Grenada
		Report	70' Riley	Stadium: National Cricket Stadium

15 February Friendly	Barbados	0–2	Guyana	St. Michael, Barbados
		Report	59' Hernández; 86' Richardson	Stadium: Barbados National Stadium; Referee: Royan Snaill (Bermuda)

12 March Friendly	Barbados	2–1	Dominica	St. Michael, Barbados
	Ettienne 28' (o.g.); Burrowes 85'	Report	88' Peters	Stadium: Barbados National Stadium

30 May Friendly	Barbados	1–1	Northern Ireland	St. Michael, Barbados
	Skinner 38'	Report	71' Healy	Stadium: Barbados National Stadium; Attendance: 8,000; Referee: Neil Brizan (Trinidad and Tobago)

13 June 2006 FIFA World Cup qualification	Barbados	0–2	Saint Kitts and Nevis	St. Michael, Barbados
		Report	78' Gumbs; 88' Newton	Stadium: Barbados National Stadium; Attendance: 3,700; Referee: Nery Alfaro (El Salvador)

19 June 2006 FIFA World Cup qualification	Saint Kitts and Nevis	3–2	Barbados	Basseterre, St. Kitts and Nevis
	Gomez 16'; Willock 22', 29'	Report	33' Skinner; 45' Goodridge	Stadium: Warner Park; Attendance: 3,500; Referee: José Pineda (Honduras)

=== 2005 ===
23 January Friendly	Barbados	3–0	Grenada	St. Michael, Barbados
	Forder 41', 58'; Bristow 53' (o.g.)	Report		Stadium: Barbados National Stadium; Attendance: 1,000

30 January Friendly	Barbados	3–1	Saint Vincent and the Grenadines	St. Michael, Barbados
	Riley 47', 82'; Goodridge 80'	Report	14' Guy	Stadium: Barbados National Stadium; Attendance: 3,000

6 February Friendly	Barbados	3–2	Antigua and Barbuda	St. Michael, Barbados
	Forde 11'; Stanford 40'; Goodridge 57'	Report	2' Thomas; 74' Byers	Stadium: Barbados National Stadium; Attendance: 4,000

13 February Friendly	Barbados	3–3	Guyana	St. Michael, Barbados
	Forde 5'; Lucas 26'; James 56'	Report	21' Richardson; 36' Cadogan; 71' Abrams	Stadium: Barbados National Stadium; Attendance: 6,000

20 February 2005 Caribbean Cup	Barbados	0–3	Cuba	St. Michael, Barbados
		Report	24', 71' Moré; 90' Galindo	Stadium: Barbados National Stadium; Attendance: 7,000

22 February 2005 Caribbean Cup	Barbados	0–1	Jamaica	St. Michael, Barbados
		Report	8' Williams	Stadium: Barbados National Stadium; Attendance: 2,100

24 February 2005 Caribbean Cup	Barbados	2–3	Trinidad and Tobago	St. Michael, Barbados
	Forde 32'; Lucas 86'	Report	11' Smith; 30' Glen; 84' Eve	Stadium: Barbados National Stadium; Attendance: 3,000

=== 2006 ===
2 September Friendly	Barbados	0–1	Guyana	St. Michael, Barbados
		Report	Jerome 44' (pen.)	Stadium: Barbados National Stadium; Attendance: 2,000

10 September Friendly	Barbados	1–1	Saint Vincent and the Grenadines	St. Michael, Barbados
	Parris 51'	Report	65' Guy	Stadium: Barbados National Stadium; Attendance: 2,000

17 September Friendly	Dominica	0–5	Barbados	Grand Bay, Dominica
		Report	27', 57' Lovell; 42' (pen.) Goodridge; 75' Williams; 80' Marshall	Stadium: Geneva Playing Field

20 September 2007 Caribbean Cup qualification	Barbados	1–1	Saint Kitts and Nevis	St. John's, Antigua and Barbuda
	Ifill 42'	Report	60' Harris	Stadium: Antigua Recreation Ground; Attendance: 300

22 September 2007 Caribbean Cup qualification	Antigua and Barbuda	1–3	Barbados	St. John's, Antigua and Barbuda
	Byers 16'	Report	44' Williams; 58' McCammon; 90' Lovell	Stadium: Antigua Recreation Ground; Attendance: 2,500

24 September 2007 Caribbean Cup qualification	Barbados	7–1	Anguilla	St. John's, Antigua and Barbuda
	McCammon 35', 44', 76'; Ifill 40', 58', 83'; Neblett 83'	Report	48' Connor	Stadium: Antigua Recreation Ground; Attendance: 450

5 November Friendly	Barbados	2–2	Grenada	Bridgetown, Barbados
	Parris 28'; Goodridge 67' (pen.)	Report	7', 45' Redhead	Stadium: Carlton Cub Ground

19 November 2007 Caribbean Cup qualification	Barbados	2–1	Bahamas	St. Michael, Barbados
	Forde 38'; Skinner 44'	Report	76' (pen.) Jean	Stadium: Barbados National Stadium; Attendance: 4,500

21 November 2007 Caribbean Cup qualification	Barbados	3–0	Saint Vincent and the Grenadines	St. Michael, Barbados
	James 16'; Forde 34'; Ifill 60' (pen.)	Report		Stadium: Barbados National Stadium

23 November 2007 Caribbean Cup qualification	Barbados	1–1	Bermuda	St. Michael, Barbados
	Ifill 4'	Report	42' Nusum	Stadium: Barbados National Stadium; Attendance: 3,300

=== 2007 ===
12 January 2007 Caribbean Cup	Trinidad and Tobago	1–1	Barbados	Port of Spain, Trinidad and Tobago
	Glasgow 31'	Report	66' Harvey	Stadium: Hasely Crawford Stadium; Attendance: 8,000; Referee: Roberto Moreno (Panama)

15 January 2007 Caribbean Cup	Haiti	2–0	Barbados	Port of Spain, Trinidad and Tobago
	Boucicaut 55'; Lormera 90'	Report		Stadium: Hasely Crawford Stadium; Attendance: 3,500; Referee: Javier Jauregui (Netherlands Antilles)

17 January 2007 Caribbean Cup	Barbados	2–3	Martinique	Port of Spain, Trinidad and Tobago
	Harvey 27'; Soares 90'	Report	8' Percin; 19' Clémentia; 32' Germany	Stadium: Hasely Crawford Stadium; Attendance: 8,500; Referee: Javier Jauregui (Netherlands Antilles)

25 March Friendly	Barbados	0–0	Guatemala	St. Michael, Barbados
		Report		Stadium: Barbados National Stadium

=== 2008 ===
13 January Friendly	Barbados	3–2	Antigua and Barbuda	Bridgetown, Barbados
	Forde 17'; Straker 39'; Lynch 63'	Report	4', 38' Byers	Stadium: Carlton Cub Ground

6 February 2010 FIFA World Cup qualification	Dominica	1–1	Barbados	Roseau, Dominica
	Pacquette 21'	Report	43' Williams	Stadium: Windsor Park; Attendance: 4,200; Referee: Wálter Quesada (Costa Rica)

13 March Friendly	Saint Vincent and the Grenadines	0–2	Barbados	Kingstown, St. Vincent and the Grenadines
		Report	38' Stanford; 87' Forde	Stadium: Victoria Park

15 March Friendly	Grenada	1–1	Barbados	St. George's, Grenada
	Rennie 43'	Report	75' Worrell	Stadium: Tanteen Recreation Ground

26 March 2010 FIFA World Cup qualification	Barbados	1–0	Dominica	Bridgetown, Barbados
	Stanford 80'	Report		Stadium: Kensington Oval; Attendance: 4,150; Referee: Carlos Batres (Guatemala)

11 May Friendly	Trinidad and Tobago	3–0	Barbados	Macoya, Trinidad and Tobago
	Gay 41'; Jorsling 87'; Edwards 90'	Report		Stadium: Marvin Lee Stadium

6 June Friendly	Bermuda	2–1	Barbados	Devonshire Parish, Bermuda
	Shakir 41'; Ming 86'	Report	44' Forde	Stadium: Bermuda National Stadium

9 June Friendly	Bermuda	3–0	Barbados	Devonshire Parish, Bermuda
	Bean 12', 18'; Nusum 45'	Report		Stadium: Bermuda National Stadium

15 June 2010 FIFA World Cup qualification	United States	8–0	Barbados	Carson, United States
	Dempsey 1', 63'; Bradley 12'; Ching 20', 89'; Donovan 59'; Johnson 82'; Ferguson 86' (o.g.)	Report		Stadium: The Home Depot Center; Attendance: 11,500; Referee: Marco Antonio Rodríguez (Mexico)

22 June 2010 FIFA World Cup qualification	Barbados	0–1	United States	Bridgetown, Barbados
		Report	21' Lewis	Stadium: Kensington Oval; Attendance: 2,000; Referee: Roberto Moreno (Panama)

26 September 2008 Caribbean Cup qualification	Barbados	2–1	British Virgin Islands	Basseterre, St. Kitts and Nevis
	Williams 11'; Forde 53'	Report	23' Lennon	Stadium: Warner Park; Attendance: 150

28 September 2008 Caribbean Cup qualification	Saint Kitts and Nevis	1–3	Barbados	Basseterre, St. Kitts and Nevis
	Isaac 13'	Report	35' Straker; 45' Skeete; 80' Williams	Stadium: Warner Park; Attendance: 500

23 October 2008 Caribbean Cup qualification	Barbados	3–2	Suriname	Havana, Cuba
	Forde 62', 65', 70'	Report	33' Sandvliet; 42' Aroepa	Stadium: Estadio Pedro Marrero; Attendance: 100

25 October 2008 Caribbean Cup qualification	Cuba	1–1	Barbados	Havana, Cuba
	Clavelo 68'	Report	66' Doyle	Stadium: Estadio Pedro Marrero; Attendance: 1,000

27 October 2008 Caribbean Cup qualification	Netherlands Antilles	1–2	Barbados	Havana, Cuba
	Bicentini 45'	Report	6' (pen.) Forde; 20' Parris	Stadium: Estadio Pedro Marrero; Attendance: 1,000

3 December 2008 Caribbean Cup	Jamaica	2–1	Barbados	Kingston, Jamaica
	Austin 76'; Shelton 82'	Report	45' Williams	Stadium: Independence Park; Attendance: 4,000

5 December 2008 Caribbean Cup	Barbados	1–2	Trinidad and Tobago	Montego Bay, Jamaica
	Goodridge 17'	Report	42' (pen.) 73' (pen.) McFarlane	Stadium: Jarrett Park

7 December 2008 Caribbean Cup	Grenada	4–2	Barbados	Trelawny, Jamaica
	Bain 11', 26', 77'; Julien 20'	Report	71', 78' Williams	Stadium: Greenfield Stadium

=== 2009 ===
8 February Friendly	Barbados	5–0	Grenada	St. Michael, Barbados
	Williams 35', 68'; McClean 43'; Harte 44'; Chandler 88'	Report		Stadium: Barbados National Stadium; Attendance: 3,000

== Results (2010s) ==
=== 2010 ===
24 September Friendly	Barbados	0–2	Dominica	St. Michael, Barbados
		Report	24' Benjamin; 38' Joseph	Stadium: Barbados National Stadium; Attendance: 625; Referee: Trevor Taylor (Barbados)

26 September Friendly	Barbados	1–3	Dominica	St. Michael, Barbados
	Harte 21'	Report	35', 45', 74' Benjamin	Stadium: Barbados National Stadium; Attendance: 580; Referee: Adrian Skeete (Barbados)

6 October 2010 Caribbean Cup qualification	Barbados	1–1	Saint Kitts and Nevis	Kingstown, St. Vincent and the Grenadines
	Williams 14'	Report	61' Isaac	Stadium: Victoria Park; Attendance: 250; Referee: Jermain Eskamp (Suriname)

8 October 2010 Caribbean Cup qualification	Montserrat	0–5	Barbados	Kingstown, St. Vincent and the Grenadines
		Report	18', 82' Forde; 36' Williams; 52' Adamson; 90' Atkins	Stadium: Victoria Park; Attendance: 350; Referee: Antonius Pinas (Suriname)

10 October 2010 Caribbean Cup qualification	Saint Vincent and the Grenadines	0–0	Barbados	Kingstown, St. Vincent and the Grenadines
		Report		Stadium: Victoria Park; Attendance: 5,420; Referee: Javier Jauregui (Netherlands Antilles)

=== 2011 ===
20 May Friendly	Guyana	1–0	Barbados	Linden, Guyana
	Bourne 90'	Report		Stadium: MacKenzie Sports Club Ground; Attendance: 300; Referee: Stanley Lancaster (Guyana)

22 May Friendly	Guyana	3–2	Barbados	Providence, Guyana
	27'; Nelson 61' (pen.); Mohamed 68'	Report	1' Lavine; 15' Williams	Stadium: Providence Stadium; Attendance: 2,500; Referee: Mark Young (Guyana)

27 May Friendly	Barbados	0–0	Saint Vincent and the Grenadines	St. Michael, Barbados
		Report		Stadium: Barbados National Stadium; Attendance: 3,500

29 May Friendly	Barbados	1–1	Guyana	St. Michael, Barbados
	Williams 24'	Report	76' (o.g.) Skeete	Stadium: Barbados National Stadium; Attendance: 2,055; Referee: Trevor Taylor (Barbados)

21 August Friendly	Barbados	4–0	Saint Lucia	St. Michael, Barbados
	Williams 35'; Atkins 45', 56'; Gibson 90'	Report		Stadium: Barbados National Stadium; Attendance: 3,500; Referee: Adrian Skeete (Barbados)

2 September 2014 FIFA World Cup qualification	Guyana	2–0	Barbados	Providence, Guyana
	Beveney 26'; Pollard 73'	Report		Stadium: Providence Stadium; Attendance: 4,500; Referee: Canaan St. Catherine (Saint Lucia)

6 September 2014 FIFA World Cup qualification	Barbados	0–2	Trinidad and Tobago	St. Michael, Barbados
		Report	17' Daniel; 67' Roberts	Stadium: Barbados National Stadium; Attendance: 3,000; Referee: Elmer Bonilla (El Salvador)

7 October 2014 FIFA World Cup qualification	Barbados	0–2	Guyana	St. Michael, Barbados
		Report	73' Abrams; 83' Nurse	Stadium: Barbados National Stadium; Attendance: 2,500; Referee: Alain Georges (Haiti)

11 October 2014 FIFA World Cup qualification	Trinidad and Tobago	4–0	Barbados	Port of Spain, Trinidad and Tobago
	Peltier 6', 55', 63'; Hector 90'	Report		Stadium: Hasely Crawford Stadium; Attendance: 3,000; Referee: Raymond Bogle (Jamaica)

11 November 2014 FIFA World Cup qualification	Bermuda	2–1	Barbados	Devonshire Parish, Bermuda
	Smith 28' (pen.); Steede 49'	Report	7' Adamson	Stadium: Bermuda National Stadium; Attendance: 1,000; Referee: Raymond Bogle (Guatemala)

14 November 2014 FIFA World Cup qualification	Barbados	1–2	Bermuda	St. Michael, Barbados
	Grosvenor 90+2'	Report	46' Wells; 72' (pen.) Smith	Stadium: Barbados National Stadium; Attendance: 1,000; Referee: Roberto Moreno (Panama)

=== 2012 ===
31 August Friendly	Saint Vincent and the Grenadines	2–0	Barbados	Kingstown, St. Vincent and the Grenadines
	Samuel 8'; Stewart 86'	Report		Stadium: Victoria Park; Attendance: 200; Referee: C. Delves (St. Vincent and the Grenadines)

1 September Friendly	Saint Vincent and the Grenadines	1–1	Barbados	Kingstown, St. Vincent and the Grenadines
	Stewart 7'	Report	31' Williams	Stadium: Victoria Park; Attendance: 500; Referee: C. Cambridge (St. Vincent and the Grenadines)

23 September 2012 Caribbean Cup qualification	Barbados	1–0	Dominica	Bridgetown, Barbados
	Williams 35'	Report		Stadium: Kensington Oval; Attendance: 300; Referee: Neal Brizan (Trinidad and Tobago)

25 September 2012 Caribbean Cup qualification	Barbados	0–1	Dominican Republic	Bridgetown, Barbados
			80' Núñez	Stadium: Kensington Oval; Attendance: 750; Referee: Jermain Eskamp (Suriname)

27 September 2012 Caribbean Cup qualification	Barbados	2–1	Aruba	Bridgetown, Barbados
	Skeete 21'; Harte 56'		32' Bergen	Stadium: Kensington Oval; Attendance: 300; Referee: Stanley Lancaster (Guyana)

=== 2014 ===
2 March Friendly	Barbados	0–2	Jamaica	St. Michael, Barbados
		Report	76' Mattocks; 82' Brown	Stadium: Barbados National Stadium; Attendance: 2,200; Referee: Sherwin Johnson (Guyana)

3 September 2014 Caribbean Cup qualification	Barbados	1–1	Suriname	Fort-de-France, Martinique
	Burgess 69'	Report	80' Faerber	Stadium: Stade Pierre-Aliker; Referee: Javier Santos (Puerto Rico)

5 September 2014 Caribbean Cup qualification	Martinique	3–2	Barbados	Rivière-Pilote, Martinique
	Boyce 57' (o.g.); Germany 68'; Goron 81'	Report	13' Morris; 30' Joseph	Stadium: Stade Alfred Marie-Jeanne

7 September 2014 Caribbean Cup qualification	Bonaire	1–4	Barbados	Fort-de-France, Martinique
	Seinpaal 90+3' (pen.)	Report	55' Boyce; 67' Harewood; 74' (pen.) 76' Harte	Stadium: Stade Pierre-Aliker

8 October 2014 Caribbean Cup qualification	Saint Kitts and Nevis	2–3	Barbados	Port au Prince, Haiti
	Elliott 12'; Panayiotou 86'	Report	16' Joseph; 24', 29' Lawrence	Stadium: Stade Sylvio Cator

10 October 2014 Caribbean Cup qualification	Haiti	4–2	Barbados	Port au Prince, Haiti
	Belfort 3', 43'; Guerrier 27'; Alcénat 67'	Report	36' Harte; 45' (o.g.) Bertin	Stadium: Stade Sylvio Cator; Referee: William Anderson (Puerto Rico)

12 October 2014 Caribbean Cup qualification	Barbados	0–2	French Guiana	Port au Prince, Haiti
		Report	45' Fabien; 55' Pigrée	Stadium: Stade Sylvio Cator

=== 2015 ===
1 February Friendly	Barbados	2–2	Guyana	St. Michael, Barbados
	Harris 36'; Harte 37'	Report	11' Holder; 33' Welshman	Stadium: Barbados National Stadium; Attendance: 2,700; Referee: Trevor Taylor (Barbados)

6 March Friendly	Barbados	3–1	Saint Vincent and the Grenadines	St. Michael, Barbados
	Headley 17'; Chandler 22'; Harewood 65'	Report	88' Cunningham	Stadium: Barbados National Stadium; Attendance: 2,000; Referee: Gillian Martindale (Barbados)

8 March Friendly	Barbados	2–2	Saint Vincent and the Grenadines	St. Michael, Barbados
	Holligan 12'; Harewood 17'	Report	3' Jilkes; 86' Slater	Stadium: Barbados National Stadium; Attendance: 1,700; Referee: Trevor Taylor (Barbados)

22 March 2018 FIFA World Cup qualification	Barbados	0–1	U.S. Virgin Islands	St. Michael, Barbados
		Report	16' Browne	Stadium: Barbados National Stadium; Attendance: 2,300; Referee: Kimbell Ward (St. Kitts and Nevis)

26 March 2018 FIFA World Cup qualification	U.S. Virgin Islands	0–4	Barbados	Charlotte Amalie, US Virgin Islands
		Report	4' Sargeant; 25' Jam. Chandler; 76' Harte; 90' Jab. Chandler	Stadium: Addelita Cancryn Junior High School Ground; Attendance: 410; Referee: Kevin Morrison (Jamaica)

1 February Friendly	Barbados	1–3	Saint Kitts and Nevis	Cave Hill, Barbados
	Harte 40'	Report	29' Isles; 52' Elliott; 90+5' Rogers	Stadium: Usain Bolt Sports Complex; Attendance: 1,100; Referee: Adrian Skeete (Barbados)

10 June 2018 FIFA World Cup qualification	Aruba	0–2	Barbados	Oranjestad, Aruba
		Report	17', 29' Boyce	Stadium: Trinidad Stadium; Attendance: 2,700; Referee: Edvin Jurisevic (United States)

14 June 2018 FIFA World Cup qualification	Barbados	0–3 (Awarded)	Aruba	Cave Hill, Barbados
	Holligan 79'	Report		Stadium: Usain Bolt Sports Complex; Attendance: 2,300; Referee: Marlon Mejia (El Salvador)

28 August Friendly	Saint Vincent and the Grenadines	2–2	Barbados	Kingstown, St. Vincent and the Grenadines
	James 42'; Slater 72'	Report	83', 89' Harte	Stadium: Victoria Park; Attendance: 600; Referee: Moeth Gaymes (St. Vincent and the Grenadines)

=== 2016 ===
23 March 2017 Caribbean Cup qualification	Barbados	1–0	Curaçao	Cave Hill, Barbados
	Harewood 69'	Report		Stadium: Usain Bolt Sports Complex

29 March 2017 Caribbean Cup qualification	Dominican Republic	2–0	Barbados	Santo Domingo, Dominican Republic
	Batista 50', 57'	Report		Stadium: Estadio Olímpico Félix Sánchez

=== 2017 ===
10 March Friendly	Trinidad and Tobago	2–0	Barbados	Couva, Trinidad and Tobago
	Boatswain 37', 45'	Report		Stadium: Ato Boldon Stadium

27 March Friendly	Barbados	2–1	Martinique	Cave Hill, Barbados
	Jules 61', 68'	Report	84' Abaul	Stadium: Usain Bolt Sports Complex; Attendance: 1,200; Referee: Moeth Gaymes (St. Vincent and the Grenadines)

7 May Friendly	Saint Kitts and Nevis	2–1	Barbados	Basseterre, St. Kitts and Nevis
	Blanchette 9'; Bertie 72'	Report	43' Jules	Stadium: Warner Park; Referee: K. Skepple (St. Kitts and Nevis)

17 June Friendly	French Guiana	3–0	Barbados	Remire-Montjoly, French Guiana
	Dutard 30'; Evens 40'; Abelinti 54'	Report		Stadium: Stade Edmard Lama

30 June Windward Islands Tournament	Dominica	2–1	Barbados	St. Patrick, Grenada
	Wade 22'; Walters 57'	Report	41' Jules	Stadium: Fond Playing Field

3 July Windward Islands Tournament	Barbados	1–1	Saint Lucia	St. George's, Grenada
	Edmee 72'	Report	35' Frederick	Stadium: Kirani James Athletic Stadium

4 July Windward Islands Tournament	Saint Vincent and the Grenadines	4–2	Barbados	St. George's, Grenada
	Cunningham 12'; Samuel 47', 55', 90'	Report	6' Holligan; 15' Harte	Stadium: Kirani James Athletic Stadium

6 July Windward Islands Tournament	Grenada	0–2	Barbados	St. George's, Grenada
		Report	8' Edmee; 65' Harte	Stadium: Kirani James Athletic Stadium

28 October Friendly	Bermuda	2–3	Barbados	Devonshire Parish, Bermuda
	Clemons 8'; Bather 19'	Report	59' Edmee; 89', 90+1' Howell	Stadium: Bermuda National Stadium

=== 2018 ===
25 March Friendly	Barbados	0–0	Bermuda	Cave Hill, Barbados
		Report		Stadium: Usain Bolt Sports Complex

3 June Friendly	Barbados	0–0	Belize	Wildey, Barbados
		Report		Stadium: Wildey Turf

4 August Friendly	Belize	1–0	Barbados	San Pedro Town, Belize
	López 79'	Report		Stadium: Ambergris Stadium; Referee: German Miranda (Nicaragua)

20 August Friendly	Barbados	2–2	Jamaica	Wildey, Barbados
	Marsh 33' (o.g.); Edmee 43'	Report	80' Morgan Jr.; 84' (pen.) Vassell	Stadium: Wildey Turf; Referee: Sherwin Moore (Guyana)

26 August Friendly	Barbados	0–0	Cuba	Wildey, Barbados
		Report		Stadium: Wildey Turf; Referee: Kimbell Ward (St. Kitts and Nevis)

29 August Friendly	Barbados	0–2	Cuba	Wildey, Barbados
		Report	41' Morris; 43' Andy Baquero	Stadium: Wildey Turf; Referee: Kimbell Ward (St. Kitts and Nevis)

6 September 2019-20 CONCACAF Nations League qualifying	Guyana	3–0 (Awarded)	Barbados	Leonora, Guyana
	Bobb 46'; Danns 78'	Report	65', 73' Hope	Stadium: Synthetic Track and Field Facility; Referee: William Anderson (Puerto Rico)

30 September Friendly	Saint Vincent and the Grenadines	1–1	Barbados	Georgetown, St. Vincent and the Grenadines
	Prescott 48'	Report	90+3' Sargeant	Stadium: Chili Playing Field

13 October 2019-20 CONCACAF Nations League qualifying	El Salvador	3–0	Barbados	San Salvador, El Salvador
	Bonilla 22'; Baires 43'; Mayen 90+2'	Report		Stadium: Estadio Cuscatlán; Referee: Gladwyn Johnson (Guyana)

18 October 2019-20 CONCACAF Nations League qualifying	Barbados	3–0	U.S. Virgin Islands	Wildey, Barbados
	Holligan 25'; Sargeant 80'; Harte 89'	Report		Stadium: Wildey Turf; Referee: Sergio Reyna (Guatemala)

=== 2019 ===
28 February Windward Islands Tournament	Saint Vincent and the Grenadines	2–0	Barbados	Kingstown, St. Vincent and the Grenadines
	Stewart 32' (pen.); Cunningham 87'	Report		Stadium: Victoria Park; Referee: Charvis Delsol (St. Vincent and the Grenadines)

4 March Windward Islands Tournament	Barbados	0–0	Grenada	Kingstown, St. Vincent and the Grenadines
		Report		Stadium: Victoria Park

6 March Windward Islands Tournament	Saint Lucia	0–2	Barbados	Kingstown, St. Vincent and the Grenadines
		Report	1' Harte; 45+1' Applewhaite	Stadium: Victoria Park; Referee: Moeth Gaymes (St. Vincent and the Grenadines)

8 March Windward Islands Tournament	Barbados	2–0	Dominica	Kingstown, St. Vincent and the Grenadines
	Stewart 2'; Harris 42'	Report		Stadium: Victoria Park; Referee: Reon Radix (Grenada)

24 March 2019-20 CONCACAF Nations League qualifying	Barbados	0–1	Nicaragua	Wildey, Barbados
		Report	65' Barrera	Stadium: Wildey Turf; Referee: Reon Radix (Grenada)

5 September 2019-20 CONCACAF Nations League	Barbados	4–0	Saint Martin	Wildey, Barbados
	Leacock 4'; Blackman 15', 49'; Gale 64'	Report		Stadium: Wildey Turf; Referee: Patrick Senecharles (Haiti)

8 September 2019-20 CONCACAF Nations League	Cayman Islands	3–2	Barbados	George Town, Cayman Islands
	Martin 5'; Ebanks 70'; Bellafonte 75'	Report	14' Hill; 74' Jules	Stadium: Truman Bodden Sports Complex; Referee: Luis Enrique Santander (Mexico)

12 October 2019-20 CONCACAF Nations League	Barbados	1–0	U.S. Virgin Islands	Wildey, Barbados
	Blackman 55'	Report		Stadium: Wildey Turf; Referee: Benjamin Pineda (Costa Rica)

15 October 2019-20 CONCACAF Nations League	U.S. Virgin Islands	0–4	Barbados	Upper Bethlehem, US Virgin Islands
		Report	17' Leacock; 77' Jules; 80' Lashley; 90' Phillips	Stadium: Bethlehem Soccer Stadium; Referee: Randy Encarnación (Dominican Republic)

16 November 2019-20 CONCACAF Nations League	Saint Martin	1–0	Barbados	The Valley, Anguilla
	Chevalier 81'	Report		Stadium: Raymond E. Guishard Technical Centre; Referee: Bryan López (Guatemala)

19 November 2019-20 CONCACAF Nations League	Barbados	3–0	Cayman Islands	Wildey, Barbados
	Hope 32', 90'; Lashley 86'	Report		Stadium: Wildey Turf; Referee: Kimbell Ward (St. Kitts and Nevis)
