= Dominica national football team results =

The Dominica national football team represents Dominica in international football under the control of the Dominica Football Association (DFA). Although a Dominica representative team had played previously, the football association was founded in 1970. It became fully affiliated to FIFA and CONCACAF in 1994.

The following list contains all results of Dominica's official matches.

== Pre-CONCACAF ==
=== 1990 ===
22 April 1990 Caribbean Cup	Saint Vincent and the Grenadines	2–1	Dominica	Arnos Vale, Saint Vincent and the Grenadines
		Report		Stadium: Arnos Vale Stadium

12 May 1990 Caribbean Cup	Dominica	1–1	French Guiana	Roseau, Dominica
	Kenrick Emmanuel 13'	Report	Robinson 87'	Stadium: Windsor Park

9 December Friendly	Antigua and Barbuda	2–1	Dominica	St. John's, Antigua and Barbuda
		Report		Stadium: Antigua Recreation Ground

=== 1992 ===
3 March 1992 Caribbean Cup	Saint Lucia	1–1	Dominica	Saint Lucia
		Report

5 March 1992 Caribbean Cup	Guadeloupe	0–0	Dominica	Saint Lucia
		Report

=== 1993 ===
25 April 1993 Caribbean Cup	Grenada	1–1	Dominica	St. George's, Grenada
		Report		Stadium: Queen's Park

27 April 1993 Caribbean Cup	Saint Lucia	4–2	Dominica	St. George's, Grenada
	Trevor Cadette 47', 57'; Ricardo Blanchard 73' (pen.), 78'	Report	Curtis Joseph 3'; Peter Greenaway 43'	Stadium: Queen's Park

29 April 1993 Caribbean Cup	Saint Vincent and the Grenadines	2–0	Dominica	St. George's, Grenada
	Junior Ballantyne,	Report		Stadium: Queen's Park

== Official ==
=== 1994 ===
23 February 1994 Caribbean Cup	Antigua and Barbuda	2–3	Dominica	Basseterre, Saint Kitts and Nevis
		Report		Stadium: Warner Park Sporting Complex

25 February 1994 Caribbean Cup	Saint Kitts and Nevis	2–3 (a.e.t.)	Dominica	Basseterre, Saint Kitts and Nevis
		Report		Stadium: Warner Park Sporting Complex

7 April 1994 Caribbean Cup	Barbados	1–1	Dominica	Port of Spain, Trinidad and Tobago
		Report		Stadium: Queen's Park Oval

9 April 1994 Caribbean Cup	Guadeloupe	5–0	Dominica	Port of Spain, Trinidad and Tobago
		Report		Stadium: Queen's Park Oval

11 April 1994 Caribbean Cup	Trinidad and Tobago	5–0	Dominica	Port of Spain, Trinidad and Tobago
	Marvin Faustin; Dexter Cyrus,,,	Report		Stadium: Queen's Park Oval

=== 1995 ===
26 March 1995 Caribbean Cup	Dominica	0–1	Saint Vincent and the Grenadines	Roseau, Dominica
		Report	Kendall Velox	Stadium: Windsor Park

2 April 1995 Caribbean Cup	Saint Vincent and the Grenadines	0–0	Dominica	Arnos Vale, Saint Vincent and the Grenadines
		Report		Stadium: Arnos Vale Stadium

19 November Friendly	Dominica	2–1	Saint Lucia	Roseau, Dominica
		Report		Stadium: Windsor Park

28 November Friendly	Dominica	1–0	Saint Vincent and the Grenadines	Roseau, Dominica
		Report		Stadium: Windsor Park

=== 1996 ===
10 March 1998 FIFA World Cup qualification	Dominica	3–3	Antigua and Barbuda	Roseau, Dominica
	Anthony Dominique 8'; George Dangler 42'; Shane Marshall 89'	Report	Quentin Clarke 15'; Derrick Edwards 28', 75'	Stadium: Windsor Park

17 March 1996 Caribbean Cup	Dominica	0–1	Saint Lucia	Roseau, Dominica
		Report		Stadium: Windsor Park

21 March 1996 Caribbean Cup	Saint Lucia	1–1	Dominica	Castries, Saint Lucia
		Report		Stadium: Mindoo Phillip Park

31 March 1998 FIFA World Cup qualification	Dominica	3–1	Antigua and Barbuda	Roseau, Dominica
	Peter Greenaway 23'; Stevenson Morancie 60'; Jeffrey Edmond 66'	Report	Derrick Edwards 59'	Stadium: Windsor Park

14 May 1998 FIFA World Cup qualification	Dominica	0–1	Barbados	Roseau, Dominica
		Report	Roger Proverbs 63'	Stadium: Windsor Park

19 May 1998 FIFA World Cup qualification	Barbados	1–0	Dominica	Bridgetown, Barbados
	Gregory Goodridge 67'	Report		Stadium: Barbados National Stadium

=== 1997 ===
2 April 1997 Caribbean Cup	Dominica	6–1	British Virgin Islands	Roseau, Dominica
		Report		Stadium: Windsor Park

4 April 1997 Caribbean Cup	Dominica	1–0	Sint Maarten	Roseau, Dominica
		Report		Stadium: Windsor Park

6 April 1997 Caribbean Cup	Dominica	5–0	Anguilla	Roseau, Dominica
		Report		Stadium: Windsor Park

27 April 1997 Caribbean Cup	Dominica	1–2	Martinique	Roseau, Dominica
		Report		Stadium: Windsor Park

4 May 1997 Caribbean Cup	Martinique	7–0	Dominica	Fort-de-France, Martinique
		Report		Stadium: Stade Pierre-Aliker

=== 1998 ===
22 February Friendly	Antigua and Barbuda	1–1	Dominica	St. John's, Antigua and Barbuda
		Report		Stadium: Antigua Recreation Ground

1 April 1998 Caribbean Cup	Guadeloupe	1–1	Dominica	Basseterre, Saint Kitts and Nevis
	Patrice Damas-Agis	Report	George Dangler (pen.)	Stadium: Warner Park Sporting Complex

3 April 1998 Caribbean Cup	Saint Kitts and Nevis	1–2	Dominica	Basseterre, Saint Kitts and Nevis
	Austin Huggins 53' (pen.)	Report	Ronnie Gustave; Peter Greenaway	Stadium: Warner Park Sporting Complex

5 April 1998 Caribbean Cup	British Virgin Islands	1–4	Dominica	Basseterre, Saint Kitts and Nevis
		Report		Stadium: Warner Park Sporting Complex

22 July 1998 Caribbean Cup	Guadeloupe	5–1	Dominica	Port of Spain, Trinidad and Tobago
	Rudolphe Rano 28', 29', 42', 72'; Dean Modestin 88'	Report	Ronnie Gustave 63'	Stadium: Hasely Crawford Stadium

24 July 1998 Caribbean Cup	Antigua and Barbuda	2–1	Dominica	Port of Spain, Trinidad and Tobago
	Derrick Edwards 6'; Winston Roberts 51'	Report	Ronnie Gustave 59'	Stadium: Hasely Crawford Stadium

26 July 1998 Caribbean Cup	Trinidad and Tobago	8–0	Dominica	Port of Spain, Trinidad and Tobago
	Stern John 19', 22', 59', 84'; David Nakhid 41', 50'; Irasto Knights 76', 88'	Report		Stadium: Hasely Crawford Stadium

=== 1999 ===
10 March 1999 Caribbean Cup	Guadeloupe	1–0	Dominica	Pointe-à-Pitre, Guadeloupe
		Report		Stadium: Stade Pierre Antonius

12 March 1999 Caribbean Cup	Barbados	3–1	Dominica	Pointe-à-Pitre, Guadeloupe
		Report		Stadium: Stade Pierre Antonius

14 March 1999 Caribbean Cup	Antigua and Barbuda	1–1	Dominica	Pointe-à-Pitre, Guadeloupe
		Report		Stadium: Stade Pierre Antonius

9 September 1999 Goodwill Football Tournament	Saint Lucia	2–0	Dominica	Georgetown, Guyana
	Jean-Marie Emerson 15', 54'	Report		Stadium: GNS Sports Complex

12 December Friendly	Saint Lucia	3–1	Dominica	Vieux Fort, Saint Lucia
	Emerson Sheldon Mark, Rene Regis	Report	???	Stadium: Friendship Park

13 December Friendly	Saint Lucia	2–1	Dominica	Vieux Fort, Saint Lucia
	Emerson Sheldon Mark; Jean-Marie Emerson	Report	???	Stadium: Friendship Park

18 December Friendly	Dominica	2–1	Saint Lucia	Roseau, Dominica
	Kelly Peters; Bronson Talbert	Report	Sommers Augustin	Stadium: Windsor Park

19 December Friendly	Dominica	2–1	Saint Lucia	Roseau, Dominica
	Kelly Peters; Jerry James	Report	Jean-Marie Emerson	Stadium: Windsor Park

=== 2000 ===
19 February Friendly	Dominica	2–0	Antigua and Barbuda	Roseau, Dominica
		Report		Stadium: Windsor Park

11 March 2002 FIFA World Cup qualification	Haiti	4–0	Dominica	Port-au-Prince, Haiti
	Golman Pierre 6', 22', 47'; Jean-Robert Menelas 42'	Report		Stadium: Stade Sylvio Cator

19 March 2002 FIFA World Cup qualification	Dominica	1–3	Haiti	Roseau, Dominica
	Kelvyn Peters 6'	Report	Golman Pierre 56', 87'; Roosevelt Desir 69'	Stadium: Windsor Park

29 April Friendly	Antigua and Barbuda	3–2	Dominica	Road Town, British Virgin Islands
		Report		Stadium: A. O. Shirley Recreation Ground

30 April Friendly	Sint Maarten	1–3	Dominica	Road Town, British Virgin Islands
		Report		Stadium: A. O. Shirley Recreation Ground

=== 2001 ===
12 March 2001 Windward Islands Tournament	Grenada	8–3	Dominica	St. George's, Grenada
	Anthony Modeste,,, Ricky Charles, Shalrie Joseph; Anthony Cyrus	Report	Kelly Peters, Peter Greenaway	Stadium: Kirani James Athletic Stadium

14 March 2001 Windward Islands Tournament	Saint Vincent and the Grenadines	2–0	Dominica	St. George's, Grenada
	Matthew Forde (pen.); Shandel Samuel	Report		Stadium: Kirani James Athletic Stadium

16 March 2001 Windward Islands Tournament	Saint Lucia	0–0	Dominica	St. George's, Grenada
		Report		Stadium: Kirani James Athletic Stadium

18 March 2001 Windward Islands Tournament	Saint Lucia	1–0	Dominica	St. George's, Grenada
	Titus Elva 15'	Report		Stadium: Kirani James Athletic Stadium

4 April 2001 Caribbean Cup	Cuba	3–1	Dominica	Uitvlugt, Guyana
	Ariel Álvarez 5'; Yénier Márquez 86' (pen.); Manuel Bobadilla 90'	Report	Vincent Casimir 49'	Stadium: Uitvlugt Community Centre Ground

6 April 2001 Caribbean Cup	Guyana	2–0	Dominica	Georgetown, Guyana
	Collie Hercules 50'; Jermaine Brown 63' (pen.)	Report		Stadium: Bourda

8 April 2001 Caribbean Cup	Saint Martin	3–2	Dominica	Georgetown, Guyana
	Franck Gendrey 31'; Victor Hodge 42'; Jerry Flanders 78'	Report	Vincent Casimir 23'; Bronson Talbert 48'	Stadium: Bourda

=== 2004 ===
28 January Friendly	British Virgin Islands	0–1	Dominica	Road Town, British Virgin Islands
		Report	Elry Cuffy 34'	Stadium: A. O. Shirley Recreation Ground

31 January Friendly	U.S. Virgin Islands	0–5	Dominica	Road Town, British Virgin Islands
		Report	Dwight Ferguson 12' (o.g.); Shane Marshall 42'; George Dangler 68'; Vincent Casimir 87'; Sherwin George 90'	Stadium: A. O. Shirley Recreation Ground

1 February Friendly	British Virgin Islands	1–2	Dominica	Road Town, British Virgin Islands
	Jairo Morris 28'	Report	Shane Marshall 44'; Kelly Peters 70'	Stadium: A. O. Shirley Recreation Ground

12 March Friendly	Barbados	2–1	Dominica	Waterford, Barbados
	Etienne Bishara 28' (o.g.); Walton Burrowes 85'	Report	Kelly Peters 88'	Stadium: Barbados National Stadium

26 March 2006 FIFA World Cup qualification	Bahamas	1–1	Dominica	Nassau, Bahamas
	Damani Horton 66'	Report	Vincent Casimir 88'	Stadium: Thomas Robinson Stadium

28 March 2006 FIFA World Cup qualification	Bahamas	1–3	Dominica	Nassau, Bahamas
	Nesley Jean 67'	Report	Vincent Casimir 39', 86'; Kelly Peters 85'	Stadium: Thomas Robinson Stadium

19 June 2006 FIFA World Cup qualification	Mexico	10–0	Dominica	San Antonio, United States
	Adolfo Bautista 9', 38'; Jared Borgetti 11', 36'; Rafael Márquez 16'; Daniel Osorno 49'; Jaime Lozano 74', 87'; Duilio Davino 77'; Francisco Palencia 90+2'	Report		Stadium: Alamodome

27 June 2006 FIFA World Cup qualification	Mexico	8–0	Dominica	Aguascalientes, Mexico
	Adolfo Bautista 2', 36'; Jaime Lozano 17', 61'; Jared Borgetti 33', 38'; David Oteo 59'; Hector Altamirano 76'	Report		Stadium: Estadio Victoria

10 November 2005 Caribbean Cup	Martinique	5–1	Dominica	Fort-de-France, Martinique
	Xavier Bullet 28', 44'; José-Thierry Goron 43'; Patrick Percin 58'; Wilfrid Thalien 87'	Report	Randolph Peltier 39'	Stadium: Stade Pierre-Aliker

12 November 2005 Caribbean Cup	Guadeloupe	7–0	Dominica	Fort-de-France, Martinique
	Dominique Mocka 13', 39'; Eric Mocka 23', 26', 35'; Michael Laurent 47'; Xavier Cassubie 76'	Report		Stadium: Stade Pierre-Aliker

14 November 2005 Caribbean Cup	French Guiana	4–0	Dominica	Fort-de-France, Martinique
	Karl Boecasse 4'; David Martinon 70'; Sylvio Breleur 78', 85'	Report		Stadium: Stade Pierre-Aliker

=== 2005 ===
30 September 2005 Friendly	Guyana	3–0	Dominica	Georgetown, Guyana
	Anthony Abrams 11'; Elroy Parks 59'; Konata Mannings 81'	Report		Stadium: Bourda

2 October 2005 Friendly	Guyana	3–0	Dominica	Georgetown, Guyana
	Kayode McKinnon 19', 42'; ??? (??)	Report		Stadium: Bourda

=== 2006 ===
3 September 2006 Friendly	Antigua and Barbuda	1–0	Dominica	St. John's, Antigua and Barbuda
	Peter Byers 50'	Report		Stadium: Antigua Recreation Ground

17 September 2006 Friendly	Dominica	0–5	Barbados	Roseau, Dominica
		Report	Paul Lovell 27', 57'; Gregory Goodridge 42' (pen.); Jeff Williams 75'; Malcolm Marshall 80'	Stadium: Windsor Park

20 September 2006 2007 Caribbean Cup qualification	Martinique	4–0	Dominica	Les Abymes, Guadeloupe
	Steeve Meslien 23' (pen.); Girier Du Fornier 43'; Johan Sourava 63'; Augustin Saint Louis 85'	Report		Stadium: Stade René Serge Nabajoth

22 September 2006 2007 Caribbean Cup qualification	Guadeloupe	1–0	Dominica	Les Abymes, Guadeloupe
	Dominique Mocka 88'	Report		Stadium: Stade René Serge Nabajoth

24 September 2006 2007 Caribbean Cup qualification	Saint Martin	0–0	Dominica	Les Abymes, Guadeloupe
		Report		Stadium: Stade René Serge Nabajoth

=== 2008 ===
18 January 2008 Friendly	Dominica	0–3	Guadeloupe	Roseau, Dominica
		Report	Yannick Darmalingon 3', 21'; Francky Gombauld	Stadium: Windsor Park

6 February 2008 2010 FIFA World Cup qualification	Dominica	1–1	Barbados	Roseau, Dominica
	Richard Pacquette 21'	Report	Rashida Williams 43'	Stadium: Windsor Park

26 March 2008 2010 FIFA World Cup qualification	Barbados	1–0	Dominica	Bridgetown, Barbados
	Dwayne Stanford 80'	Report		Stadium: Kensington Oval

8 August 2008 2008 Caribbean Cup qualification	Guyana	3–0	Dominica	Providence, Guyana
	Nigel Codrington 20', 43'; Glenorvan Edmonds 36'	Report		Stadium: National Stadium

9 August 2008 2008 Caribbean Cup qualification	Suriname	3–1	Dominica	Providence, Guyana
	Marlon Felter 18'; Clifton Sandvliet 54'; Ferdinand Jap-A-Joe 81'	Report	Prince Austrie 7'	Stadium: National Stadium

=== 2009 ===
5 December 2009 Friendly	Dominica	4–0	British Virgin Islands	Roseau, Dominica
	Prince Austrie 8'; Kelly Peters 23'; Kurlson Benjamin 25'; Chestin Dangleben 85'	Report		Stadium: Windsor Park

=== 2010 ===
24 September 2010 Friendly	Barbados	0–2	Dominica	Bridgetown, Barbados
		Report	Kurlson Benjamin 24'; Mitchell Joseph 38'	Stadium: Barbados National Stadium

25 September 2010 Friendly	Barbados	1–3	Dominica	Bridgetown, Barbados
	Mario Harte 21'	Report	Kurlson Benjamin 35', 45', 74'	Stadium: Barbados National Stadium

15 October 2010 2010 Caribbean Cup qualification	British Virgin Islands	0–10	Dominica	San Cristóbal, Dominican Republic
		Report	Mitchell Joseph 1', 11', 13'; Kurlson Benjamin 48', 71', 81', 84', 85'; Chad Bertrand 55'; Donan Jervier 87'	Stadium: Estadio Panamericano

17 October 2010 2010 Caribbean Cup qualification	Dominican Republic	0–1	Dominica	San Cristóbal, Dominican Republic
		Report	Elmond Derrick 71'	Stadium: Estadio Panamericano

10 November 2010 2010 Caribbean Cup qualification	Cuba	4–2	Dominica	St. John's, Antigua and Barbuda
	Armando Coroneaux 9'; Reysander Fernández 20'; Yoel Colomé 27'; Marcel Hernández 35'	Report	Kurlson Benjamin 11', 87'	Stadium: Antigua Recreation Ground

12 November 2010 2010 Caribbean Cup qualification	Antigua and Barbuda	0–0	Dominica	St. John's, Antigua and Barbuda
		Report		Stadium: Antigua Recreation Ground

14 November 2010 2010 Caribbean Cup qualification	Suriname	5–0	Dominica	St. John's, Antigua and Barbuda
	Naldo Kwasie 45'; Ives Vlijter 46'; Emilio Limón 56'; Roché Emanuelson 75'; Stefano Rijssel 87' (pen.)	Report		Stadium: Antigua Recreation Ground

=== 2011 ===
2 September 2011 2014 FIFA World Cup qualification	Dominica	0–2	Nicaragua	Roseau, Dominica
		Report	Raúl Leguías 1'; Félix Rodríguez 36'	Stadium: Windsor Park

11 September 2011 Friendly	Saint Vincent and the Grenadines	1–0	Dominica	Kingstown, Saint Vincent and the Grenadines
	Akeeno Hazelwood 21'	Report		Stadium: Arnos Vale Stadium

7 October 2011 2014 FIFA World Cup qualification	Dominica	0–5	Panama	Roseau, Dominica
		Report	Amir Waithe 26', 89'; Luis Tejada 34'; Blas Pérez 57'; Ricardo Buitrago 62'	Stadium: Windsor Park

11 November 2011 2014 FIFA World Cup qualification	Nicaragua	1–0	Dominica	Managua, Nicaragua
	Raúl Leguías 57'	Report		Stadium: Estadio Nacional de Fútbol

15 November 2011 2014 FIFA World Cup qualification	Panama	3–0	Dominica	Panama City, Panama
	Rolando Blackburn 6'; Ricardo Buitrago 20'; Blas Pérez 84'	Report		Stadium: Estadio Rommel Fernández

=== 2012 ===
23 September 2012 2012 Caribbean Cup qualification	Barbados	1–0	Dominica	Bridgetown, Barbados
	Rashinda Williams 35'	Report		Stadium: Kensington Oval

25 September 2012 2012 Caribbean Cup qualification	Aruba	2–3	Dominica	Bridgetown, Barbados
	Jean-Luc Bergen 40'; Frederick Gomez 55'	Report	Chad Bertrand 36'; Kurlson Benjamin 45', 77'	Stadium: Kensington Oval

27 September 2012 2012 Caribbean Cup qualification	Dominican Republic	2–1	Dominica	Bridgetown, Barbados
	Jonathan Faña 66', 90+3'	Report	Lester Langlais 39'	Stadium: Kensington Oval

=== 2013 ===
30 November 2013 Friendly	Dominica	0–1	Saint Lucia	Roseau, Dominica
		Report	Eden Charles 70'	Stadium: Windsor Park

1 December 2013 Friendly	Dominica	1–0	Saint Lucia	Roseau, Dominica
	Randolph Peltier 50' (pen.)	Report		Stadium: Windsor Park

=== 2014 ===
7 February 2014 Friendly	Saint Vincent and the Grenadines	3–2	Dominica	Kingstown, Saint Vincent and the Grenadines
	Nazir McBurnette 10'; Azinho Solomon 39'; Kevin Francis 82'	Report	Delroy Parker 71'; Mitchell Joseph 83'	Stadium: Sion Hill Playing Field

9 February 2014 Friendly	Saint Vincent and the Grenadines	0–0	Dominica	Kingstown, Saint Vincent and the Grenadines
		Report		Stadium: Sion Hill Playing Field

30 April 2014 2014 Windward Islands Tournament	Dominica	0–2	Saint Lucia	Roseau, Dominica
		Report	Gerlanne Neptune 5'; Eden Charles 47'	Stadium: Windsor Park

2 May 2014 2014 Windward Islands Tournament	Dominica	2–3	Saint Vincent and the Grenadines	Roseau, Dominica
	Matthew Walsh 24'; Chris Lawrence 35'	Report	Kevin Francis 1'; Oalex Anderson 15', 29'	Stadium: Windsor Park

4 May 2014 2014 Windward Islands Tournament	Dominica	3–5	Grenada	Roseau, Dominica
	Julian Wade 4', 51'; Delroy Parker 36'	Report	Jake Rennie 15', 71'; Nicko Williams 78'; Denron Daniel 87', 88'	Stadium: Windsor Park

3 September 2014 2014 Caribbean Cup qualification	Guyana	0–0	Dominica	Basseterre, Saint Kitts and Nevis
		Report		Stadium: Warner Park Sporting Complex

5 September 2014 2014 Caribbean Cup qualification	Saint Kitts and Nevis	5–0	Dominica	Basseterre, Saint Kitts and Nevis
	Kervin Lawrence 3' (o.g.); Romaine Sawyers 18' (pen.); Atiba Harris 29'; Zephaniah Thomas 77'; Joash Leader 85'	Report		Stadium: Warner Park Sporting Complex

7 September 2014 2014 Caribbean Cup qualification	Saint Lucia	2–1	Dominica	Basseterre, Saint Kitts and Nevis
	Cliff Valcin 13', 76'	Report	Julian Wade 68'	Stadium: Warner Park Sporting Complex

=== 2015 ===
15 March 2015 Friendly	Antigua and Barbuda	1–0	Dominica	St. John's, Antigua and Barbuda
	Tamarley Thomas 32'	Report		Stadium: Antigua Recreation Ground

26 March 2015 2018 FIFA World Cup qualification	Dominica	3–2	British Virgin Islands	Roseau, Dominica
	Glensworth Elizee 45+1'; Mitchell Joseph 65'; Randolph Peltier 80'	Report	Edward Moss 42'; Jordan Johnson 52'	Stadium: Windsor Park

29 March 2015 2018 FIFA World Cup qualification	Dominica	0–0	British Virgin Islands	Roseau, Dominica
		Report		Stadium: Windsor Park

12 May 2015 2015 Windward Islands Tournament	Saint Lucia	1–1	Dominica	Vieux Fort, Saint Lucia
	Malik St. Prix 16'	Report	Glensworth Elizee 83'	Stadium: Philip Marcellin Grounds

14 May 2015 2015 Windward Islands Tournament	Grenada	1–2	Dominica	Vieux Fort, Saint Lucia
	Cassim Langaigne 18'	Report	Julian Wade 20'; Glensworth Elizee 75'	Stadium: Philip Marcellin Grounds

16 May 2015 2015 Windward Islands Tournament	Saint Vincent and the Grenadines	1–0	Dominica	Vieux Fort, Saint Lucia
	Myron Samuel 22'	Report		Stadium: Philip Marcellin Grounds

11 June 2015 2018 FIFA World Cup qualification	Dominica	0–2	Canada	Roseau, Dominica
		Report	Cyle Larin 5'; Russell Teibert 64' (pen.)	Stadium: Windsor Park

11 June 2015 2018 FIFA World Cup qualification	Canada	4–0	Dominica	Toronto, Canada
	Tesho Akindele 4'; Cyle Larin 41'; Tosaint Ricketts 52', 78'	Report		Stadium: BMO Field

=== 2016 ===
26 March 2016 2017 Caribbean Cup qualification	British Virgin Islands	0–7	Dominica	Road Town, British Virgin Islands
		Report	Ryan Dicker 20' (o.g.); Kelrick Walter 28', 51'; Chad Bertrand 33'; Julian Wade 44', 55', 85' (pen.)	Stadium: A. O. Shirley Recreation Ground

29 March 2016 2017 Caribbean Cup qualification	Dominica	1–4	Martinique	Roseau, Dominica
	Chad Bertrand 44' (pen.)	Report	Malcolm Joseph 11' (o.g.); Daniel Hérelle 23'; Yoann Arquin 53'; Stéphane Abaul 88'	Stadium: Windsor Park

4 June 2016 2017 Caribbean Cup qualification	Guadeloupe	2–1	Dominica	Les Abymes, Guadeloupe
	Elbert Anatol 23'; Gilles Dan 64'	Report	Julian Wade 41'	Stadium: Stade René Serge Nabajoth

7 June 2016 2017 Caribbean Cup qualification	Dominica	0–4	Martinique	Roseau, Dominica
		Report	Johan Audel 6'; Jordy Delem 47'; Bruno Grougi 58'; Steeven Langil 69'	Stadium: Windsor Park

=== 2017 ===
17 May 2017 Friendly	Guadeloupe	2–2	Dominica	Les Abymes, Guadeloupe
	Freddy Morand 21'; Rudy Vouteau 90+3' (pen.)	Report	Julian Wade 56' (pen.), 68'	Stadium: Stade René Serge Nabajoth

28 June 2017 2017 Windward Islands Tournament	Grenada	1–1	Dominica	St. George's, Grenada
	Rickson Phillip 84'	Report	Julian Wade 14'	Stadium: Kirani James Athletic Stadium

30 June 2017 2017 Windward Islands Tournament	Barbados	1–2	Dominica	Sauteurs, Grenada
	Rashad Jules 41'	Report	Julian Wade 22'; Kelrick Walter 52'	Stadium: Fond Playing Field

4 July 2017 2017 Windward Islands Tournament	Saint Lucia	0–0	Dominica	St. George's, Grenada
		Report		Stadium: Kirani James Athletic Stadium

6 July 2017 2017 Windward Islands Tournament	Saint Vincent and the Grenadines	2–2	Dominica	St. George's, Grenada
	Dennis Prescott 29'; Zenroy Lee 44'	Report	Julian Wade 26' (pen.); Briel Thomas 56'	Stadium: Kirani James Athletic Stadium

=== 2018 ===
1 April 2018 Friendly	Antigua and Barbuda	0–0	Dominica	St. John's, Antigua and Barbuda
		Report		Stadium: Antigua Recreation Ground

11 August 2018 Friendly	Guadeloupe	0–0	Dominica	Les Abymes, Guadeloupe
		Report		Stadium: Stade René Serge Nabajoth

6 September 2018 2019–20 CNL qualification	Dominica	0–0	Suriname	Les Abymes, Guadeloupe
		Report		Stadium: Stade René Serge Nabajoth

16 October 2018 2019–20 CNL qualification	Canada	5–0	Dominica	Toronto, Canada
	Jonathan David 3'; Junior Hoilett 14'; Lucas Cavallini 18' (pen.); Malcolm Joseph 47' (o.g.); Cyle Larin 82'	Report		Stadium: BMO Field

20 November 2018 2019–20 CNL qualification	Sint Maarten	0–2	Dominica	The Valley, Anguilla
		Report	Julian Wade 6'; Randolph Peltier 52'	Stadium: Raymond E. Guishard Technical Centre

=== 2019 ===
2 March 2019 2019 Windward Islands Tournament	Grenada	0–1	Dominica	Kingstown, Saint Vincent and the Grenadines
		Report	Anfernee Frederick 43'	Stadium: Victoria Park

4 March 2019 2019 Windward Islands Tournament	Saint Lucia	1–1	Dominica	Kingstown, Saint Vincent and the Grenadines
	Aaron Richard 33'	Report	Travist Joseph 36'	Stadium: Victoria Park

6 March 2019 2019 Windward Islands Tournament	Saint Vincent and the Grenadines	2–1	Dominica	Kingstown, Saint Vincent and the Grenadines
	Chavel Cunningham 45+1', 90+4'	Report	Briel Thomas 64'	Stadium: Victoria Park

8 March 2019 2019 Windward Islands Tournament	Barbados	2–0	Dominica	Kingstown, Saint Vincent and the Grenadines
	Shaquille Stewart 2'; Jomo Harris 42'	Report		Stadium: Victoria Park

23 March 2019 2019–20 CNL qualification	Dominica	4–0	Bahamas	Roseau, Dominica
	Julian Wade 24', 35'; Travist Joseph 30'; Briel Thomas 85'	Report		Stadium: Windsor Park

5 September 2019 2019–20 CNL B	Dominica	1–2	Suriname	Roseau, Dominica
	Anfernee Frederick 23'	Report	Gleofilo Vlijter 7', 90'	Stadium: Windsor Park

8 September 2019 2019–20 CNL B	Saint Vincent and the Grenadines	1–0	Dominica	Arnos Vale, Saint Vincent and the Grenadines
	Chavel Cunningham 45+2'	Report		Stadium: Arnos Vale Stadium

4 October 2019 Friendly	Saint Lucia	3–1	Dominica	Gros Islet, Saint Lucia
		Report		Stadium: Gross Islet Playing Field

6 October 2019 Friendly	Saint Lucia	1–4	Dominica	La Ressource, Saint Lucia
		Report		Stadium: Stadium Mabouya

11 October 2019 2019–20 CNL B	Nicaragua	3–1	Dominica	Managua, Nicaragua
	Carlos Chavarría 7', 41'; Ulises Rayo 90+1'	Report	Julian Wade 90+3'	Stadium: Nicaragua National Football Stadium

14 October 2019 2019–20 CNL B	Dominica	0–4	Nicaragua	Roseau, Dominica
		Report	Carlos Chavarría 42'; Byron Bonilla 71', 84' (pen.); Ricardo Mendieta 90+2'	Stadium: Windsor Park

15 November 2019 2019–20 CNL B	Suriname	4–0	Dominica	Paramaribo, Suriname
		Report	Dimitrie Apai 15', 88'; Gleofilo Vlijter 60', 74'	Stadium: André Kamperveen Stadion

18 November 2019 2019–20 CNL B	Dominica	1–0	Saint Vincent and the Grenadines	Roseau, Dominica
	Audel Laville 71'	Report		Stadium: Windsor Park

=== 2021 ===
24 March 2022 FIFA World Cup qualification	Dominican Republic	1–0	Dominica	Santo Domingo, Dominican Republic
19:00 UTC−4	Fran Núñez 52'	Report		Stadium: Félix Sánchez Olympic Stadium

28 March 2022 FIFA World Cup qualification	Dominica	1–2	Panama	Santo Domingo, Dominican Republic
16:00 UTC−4	Audel Laville 82'	Report	Briel Thomas 28' (o.g.); José Fajardo 85'	Stadium: Félix Sánchez Olympic Stadium

2 June 2022 FIFA World Cup qualification	Dominica	3–0	Anguilla	Santo Domingo, Dominican Republic
15:00 UTC−4	Briel Thomas 3'; Chad Bertrand 34'; Julian Wade 42'	Report		Stadium: Félix Sánchez Olympic Stadium

8 June 2022 FIFA World Cup qualification	Barbados	1–1	Dominica	Santo Domingo, Dominican Republic
19:00 UTC−4	Emile Saimovici 48'	Report	Julian Wade 57'	Stadium: Estadio Olímpico Félix Sánchez

=== 2022 ===
12 May Friendly	Dominica	2–1	Saint Vincent and the Grenadines	Roseau, Dominica
	Briel Thomas 14'; Darryl Longdon 87'	Report	Malcolm Stewart 3'	Stadium: Windsor Park

15 May Friendly	Dominica	3–1	Saint Vincent and the Grenadines	Roseau, Dominica
	Audel Laville 31', 60'; Javid George 85'	Report	Rondell Thomas 45+1'	Stadium: Windsor Park

2 June 2022–23 CNL C	Anguilla	0–0	Dominica	The Valley, Anguilla
		Report		Stadium: Raymond E. Guishard Stadium

5 June 2022–23 CNL C	Dominica	1–1	Anguilla	Basseterre, Saint Kitts and Nevis
	Julian Wade 4'	Report	Jonathan Guishard 57'	Stadium: Warner Park

9 June 2022–23 CNL C	Dominica	0–1	Saint Lucia	Roseau, Dominica
		Report	Jevick Macfarlane 54'	Stadium: Windsor Park

=== 2023 ===
27 March 2022–23 CNL C	Saint Lucia	3–1	Dominica	Gros Islet, Saint Lucia
19:00	Gregson President 19'; Kurt Frederick 40', 62'	Report	Briel Thomas 84'	Stadium: Daren Sammy Cricket Ground

12 September 2023–24 CNL C	Turks and Caicos Islands	0–3	Dominica	Providenciales, Turks and Caicos Islands
16:00 UTC−4		Report	Troy Jules 18', 64'; Briel Thomas 90+3'	Stadium: TCIFA National Academy

12 October 2023–24 CNL C	Dominica	1–1	British Virgin Islands	Gros Islet, Saint Lucia
	Briel Thomas 83'	Report	Luka Chalwell 29'	Stadium: Daren Sammy Cricket Ground

16 November 2023–24 CNL C	British Virgin Islands	1–2	Dominica	Road Town, British Virgin Islands
	T´Sharne Gallimore 63'	Report	Audel Laville 52'; Eustace Marshall 67'	Stadium: A. O. Shirley Recreation Ground

20 November 2023–24 CNL C	Turks and Caicos Islands	0–2	Dominica	Road Town, British Virgin Islands
		Report	Audel Laville 15'; Javid George 61'	Stadium: A. O. Shirley Recreation Ground

=== 2024 ===
2 May Friendly	Saint Vincent and the Grenadines	1–3	Dominica	Kingstown, Saint Vincent and the Grenadines
	Oryan Velox	Report	Chad Bertrand 59'; Audel Laville 71', 86'	Stadium: Victoria Park

5 May Friendly	Saint Vincent and the Grenadines	2–0	Dominica	Kingstown, Saint Vincent and the Grenadines
	Steven Pierre 75', 82'	Report		Stadium: Victoria Park

5 June 2026 FIFA World Cup qualification	Guatemala	6–0	Dominica	Guatemala City, Guatemala
20:00 UTC−6	Alejandro Galindo 4', 48'; Allen Yanes 27'; Rubio Rubin 58'; José Carlos Martínez 78'; José Morales 83'	Report		Stadium: Estadio Doroteo Guamuch Flores; Referee: Víctor Cáceres Hernández (Mexico)

9 June 2026 FIFA World Cup qualification	Dominica	2–3	Jamaica	Roseau, Dominica
15:00 UTC−4	Javid George 83'; Troy Jules 89'	Report	Shamar Nicholson 31', 80' (pen.); Kaheim Dixon 43'	Stadium: Windsor Park; Attendance: 6,500; Referee: Fernando Guerrero (Mexico)

7 September 2024-25 CONCACAF Nations League B	Antigua and Barbuda	1–2	Dominica	Piggotts, Antigua and Barbuda
	Javorn Stevens 53'	Report	Chad Bertrand 46'; Travist Joseph 57'	Stadium: ABFA Technical Center

10 September 2024-25 CONCACAF Nations League B	Dominican Republic	2–0	Dominica	Piggotts, Antigua and Barbuda
	Ronaldo Vásquez 11'; Dorny Romero 25'	Report		Stadium: ABFA Technical Center

=== 2025 ===
9 May Friendly	Dominica	0–0	Barbados	Roseau, Dominica
19:00 UTC-4				Stadium: DFA Technical Center Stadium

11 May Friendly	Dominica	0-0	Barbados	Roseau, Dominica
16:00 UTC-4				Stadium: Windsor Park

12 November 2025 2025-26 CONCACAF Series	Dominica	1–2	Saint Martin	Basseterre, Saint Kitts and Nevis
16:00 UTC−4	Jules 47'	Report	Bellechasse 79', 90+1' (pen.)	Stadium: SKNFA Technical Center; Referee: Randy Encarnación (Dominican Republic)

15 November 2025 2025-26 CONCACAF Series	Dominica	2–3	Sint Maarten	Basseterre, Saint Kitts and Nevis
16:00 UTC−4	Joseph 43', 71'	Report	Bleeker 22'; de Nooijer 66'; Amatkarijo 75' (pen.)	Stadium: SKNFA Technical Center

=== 2026 ===
27 March 2025–26 CONCACAF Series	Guyana	2–0	Dominica	Santiago de los Caballeros, Dominican Republic
16:30 UTC−4	De Rosario 28', 31'	Report		Stadium: Estadio Cibao FC; Referee: Patrick Senecharles (Haiti)

30 March 2025–26 CONCACAF Series	Dominica	0–0	Sint Maarten	Santiago de los Caballeros, Dominican Republic
19:30 UTC−4		Report		Stadium: Estadio Cibao FC; Referee: Adrian Lage (Cuba)

24 September 2026–27 CONCACAF Nations League	Cayman Islands	0-0	Dominica	Roseau, Dominica
20:00 UTC−4		Report		Stadium: Windsor Park

27 September 2026–27 CONCACAF Nations League	Dominica	0-2	Puerto Rico	Roseau, Dominica
20:00 UTC−4		Report	Sulia 4' Rivera 37'	Stadium: Windsor Park

1 October 2026–27 CONCACAF Nations League	Dominica	1-5	Guyana	Mayagüez, Puerto Rico
17:00 UTC−4	Jules 75'	Report	De Rosario 27' Glasgow 41' Moore 50' Benjamin 79' George 90'	Stadium: Mayagüez Athletics Stadium

4 October 2026–27 CONCACAF Nations League	Guyana	8-1	Dominica	Mayagüez, Puerto Rico
15:00 UTC−4	Glasgow 5', 33' Moore 18', 57' Bonds 24', 75' Kellman 53' George 69'	Report	Reon Cuffy 67'	Stadium: Mayagüez Athletics Stadium

13 November 2026–27 CONCACAF Nations League	Puerto Rico	v	Dominica	Georgetown, Guyana
15:00 UTC−4				Stadium: Synthetic Track and Field Facility

17 November 2026–27 CONCACAF Nations League	Dominica	v	Cayman Islands	Georgetown, Guyana
15:00 UTC−4				Stadium: Synthetic Track and Field Facility

== All-time record ==
Key

- Pld = Matches played
- W = Matches won
- D = Matches drawn
- L = Matches lost
- GF = Goals for
- GA = Goals against
- GD = Goal differential
- Countries are listed in alphabetical order

As of match played 4 October 2026

Positive Record Neutral Record Negative Record

Opponent	Pld	W	D	L	GF	GA	GD
Anguilla	5	3	2	0	10	1	+9
Antigua and Barbuda	15	4	6	5	19	18	1
Aruba	1	1	0	0	3	2	1
Bahamas	3	2	1	0	8	2	6
Barbados	16	3	5	8	10	21	-11
Bermuda	2	0	0	2	3	9	-6
British Virgin Islands	12	10	2	0	43	7	36
Canada	3	0	0	3	0	11	-11
Cayman Islands	1	0	1	0	0	0	0
Cuba	2	0	0	2	3	7	-4
Dominican Republic	6	1	0	5	3	16	-13
Guatemala	1	0	0	1	0	6	-6
French Guiana	2	0	1	1	1	5	-4
Grenada	6	2	2	2	11	16	-5
Guadeloupe	11	0	4	7	5	27	-22
Guyana	8	0	1	7	2	26	-24
Haiti	2	0	0	2	1	7	-6
Jamaica	1	0	0	1	2	3	-1
Martinique	6	0	0	6	3	26	-23
Mexico	2	0	0	2	0	18	-18
Nicaragua	4	0	0	4	1	10	-9
Panama	3	0	0	3	1	10	-9
Puerto Rico	1	0	0	1	0	2	-2
Saint Kitts and Nevis	3	2	0	1	5	8	-3
Saint Lucia	23	5	6	12	22	33	-11
Saint Martin	3	0	1	2	3	5	-2
Saint Vincent and the Grenadines	19	5	3	11	18	25	-7
Sint Maarten	5	3	1	1	8	4	+4
Suriname	5	0	1	4	2	14	-12
Trinidad and Tobago	2	0	0	2	0	13	-13
Turks and Caicos Islands	2	2	0	0	5	0	5
U.S. Virgin Islands	1	1	0	0	5	0	5
Total	176	44	37	95	197	352	-155
