= 2010 Caribbean Cup qualification =

The qualifying competition for the 2010 Caribbean Championship was a football tournament held from 2 October to 14 November 2010 to determine the qualifying teams for the 2010 Caribbean Championship. 21 teams entered the qualifying competition (hosts Martinique and title holders Jamaica automatically qualified), with six teams qualifying for the final tournament. The tournament was played over two rounds. In the first round, the 15 lowest ranked teams competed in three groups of four and one group of three in a round-robin. The winners of the four groups and the two best runners-up of the three groups of four advanced to the second round. In the second round, the six qualifying teams from the first round joined the second through seventh highest ranked teams from the 2008 Caribbean Championship to compete in three groups of four in a round-robin. The two best teams from each group advanced to join Martinique and Jamaica in the final tournament.

== First round ==
The four group winners along with the two best second-place teams from Groups A, B, and C advanced to Qualifying Group Stage Two.

Tiebreakers (apply to all group stages)

1. Greater number of points in matches between the tied teams.
2. Greater goal difference in matches between the tied teams (if more than two teams finish equal on points).
3. Greater number of goals scored in matches among the tied teams (if more than two teams finish equal on points).
4. Greater goal difference in all group matches.
5. Greater number of goals scored in all group matches.
6. Drawing of lots.

=== Group A ===
Played in Puerto Rico from 2–6 October.

Team	Pld	W	D	L	GF	GA	GD	Pts
Puerto Rico	3	3	0	0	7	1	+6	9
Cayman Islands	3	1	1	1	5	4	+1	4
Anguilla	3	1	0	2	4	8	-4	3
Saint-Martin	3	0	1	2	2	5	-3	1

2 October 2010
19:00 UTC-04:00

Saint-Martin	1–1	Cayman Islands
Virgile 55'	Report	P. Brown 24' (pen.)

Estadio Juan Ramón Loubriel, Bayamón
Attendance: 600
Referee: Courtney Campbell (Jamaica)
2 October 2010
21:00 UTC-04:00

Puerto Rico	3–1	Anguilla
Hansen 28'; Megaloudis 32', 81'	Report	A. Richardson 52' (pen.)

Estadio Juan Ramón Loubriel, Bayamón
Attendance: 2,050
Referee: Kevin Thomas (Jamaica)

4 October 2010
19:00 UTC-04:00

Cayman Islands	4–1	Anguilla
M. Ebanks 45+2' (pen.), 48'; Wood 56'; P. Brown 58'	Report	Brooks 33'

Estadio Juan Ramón Loubriel, Bayamón
Attendance: 500
Referee: Lee Davis (Trinidad and Tobago)
4 October 2010
21:00 UTC-04:00

Puerto Rico	2–0	Saint-Martin
Krause 25'; Arrieta 79'	Report

Estadio Juan Ramón Loubriel, Bayamón
Attendance: 1,800
Referee: Valdin Legister (Jamaica)

6 October 2010
19:00 UTC-04:00

Anguilla	2–1	Saint-Martin
Brooks 16'; Rogers 37'	Report	Virgile 14'

Estadio Juan Ramón Loubriel, Bayamón
Attendance: 500
Referee: Lee Davis (Trinidad and Tobago)
6 October 2010
21:00 UTC-04:00

Puerto Rico	2–0	Cayman Islands
Megaloudis 25'; Figueroa 88'	Report

Estadio Juan Ramón Loubriel, Bayamón
Attendance: 3,800
Referee: Courtney Campbell (Jamaica)

=== Group B ===
Played in Saint Vincent and the Grenadines from 6–10 October.

Team	Pld	W	D	L	GF	GA	GD	Pts
Saint Kitts and Nevis	3	1	2	0	6	2	+4	5
Saint Vincent	3	1	2	0	8	1	+7	5
Barbados	3	1	2	0	6	1	+5	5
Montserrat	3	0	0	3	0	16	-16	0

- Saint Kitts and Nevis ranked ahead of Saint Vincent and Barbados based on head-to-head tiebreaker. The 3 matches played among the teams were all draws; Saint Kitts and Nevis scored more goals (2) than Saint Vincent and Barbados (1 each) in those matches.
6 October 2010
17:00 UTC-04:00

Barbados	1–1	Saint Kitts and Nevis
Ra. Williams 14'	Report	G. Isaac 62'

Victoria Park, Kingstown
Attendance: 250
Referee: Jermain Elskamp (Suriname)
6 October 2010
19:00 UTC-04:00

Saint Vincent	7–0	Montserrat
S. Samuel 26' (pen.), 27', 67'; Francis 56'; Stewart 64'; Balcombe 70'; Snagg 89'	Report

Victoria Park, Kingstown
Attendance: 5,000
Referee: Antonius Pinas (Suriname)

8 October 2010
18:00 UTC-04:00

Montserrat	0–5	Barbados
	Report	Forde 18', 82'; Ri. Williams 36'; Adamson 52'; Atkins 90'

Victoria Park, Kingstown
Attendance: 350
Referee: Antonius Pinas (Suriname)
8 October 2010
20:30 UTC-04:00

Saint Vincent	1–1	Saint Kitts and Nevis
James 73'	Report	Francis 40'

Victoria Park, Kingstown
Attendance: 4,000
Referee: Javier Jauregui (Netherlands Antilles)

10 October 2010
18:00 UTC-04:00

Saint Kitts and Nevis	4–0	Montserrat
Saddler 17', 31'; Gumbs 20'; Lake 90'	Report

Victoria Park, Kingstown
Attendance: 1,100
Referee: Jermain Elskamp (Suriname)
10 October 2010
20:30 UTC-04:00

Saint Vincent	0–0	Barbados
	Report

Victoria Park, Kingstown
Attendance: 5,420
Referee: Javier Jauregui (Netherlands Antilles)

=== Group C ===
Played in Suriname from 13 to 17 October.

Team	Pld	W	D	L	GF	GA	GD	Pts
Guyana	3	3	0	0	6	2	+4	9
Suriname	3	2	0	1	4	4	0	6
Netherlands Antilles	3	0	1	2	5	7	-2	1
Saint Lucia	3	0	1	2	3	5	-2	1

13 October 2010
19:00 UTC-03:00

Guyana	1–0	Saint Lucia
Bourne 9'	Report

André Kamperveen Stadion, Paramaribo
Attendance: 500
Referee: Lee Davis (Trinidad and Tobago)
13 October 2010
21:00 UTC-03:00

Suriname	2–1	Netherlands Antilles
Vlijter 37'; Aloema 90+1' (pen.)	Report	Pauletta 81'

André Kamperveen Stadion, Paramaribo
Attendance: 800
Referee: Bryan Willet (Antigua and Barbuda)

15 October 2010
19:00 UTC-03:00

Netherlands Antilles	2–3	Guyana
Anastatia 74' (pen.); Kunst 84'	Report	Peters 15'; Abrams 45'; Moore 57'

André Kamperveen Stadion, Paramaribo
Attendance: 750
Referee: James Matthew (Saint Kitts and Nevis)
15 October 2010
21:00 UTC-03:00

Suriname	2–1	Saint Lucia
Rijssel 14'; Vlijter 38' (pen.)	Report	Polius 77'

André Kamperveen Stadion, Paramaribo
Attendance: 750
Referee: Ignatius Baptiste (Dominica)

17 October 2010
19:00 UTC-03:00

Saint Lucia	2–2	Netherlands Antilles
Polius 7', 36'	Report	Trenidad 30'; Anastatia 89' (pen.)

André Kamperveen Stadion, Paramaribo
Attendance: 2,800
Referee: Bryan Willet (Antigua and Barbuda)
17 October 2010
21:00 UTC-03:00

Suriname	0–2	Guyana
	Report	Moore 17' (pen.); Millington 90'

André Kamperveen Stadion, Paramaribo
Attendance: 2,800
Referee: Lee Davis (Trinidad and Tobago)

=== Group D ===
Played in Dominican Republic from 14 to 17 October.

- Note – Dominican Republic vs British Virgin Islands was scheduled for 13 October but was postponed by one day due to the late arrival of the British Virgin Islands.

Team	Pld	W	D	L	GF	GA	GD	Pts
Dominica	2	2	0	0	11	0	+11	6
Dominican Republic	2	1	0	1	17	1	+16	3
British Virgin Islands	2	0	0	2	0	27	-27	0

- Only the group winner could advance to the next stage.
14 October 2010
11:00 UTC-04:00

Dominican Republic	17–0	British Virgin Islands
Batista 5', 67', 68', 72', 79'; Peralta 22', 43', 77'; Navarro 26', 47', 81'; Reynoso 61', 73'; Severino 64'; Ozuna 82', 90'; Frechilla 90+1'	Report

Estadio Panamericano, San Cristóbal
Attendance: 200
Referee: Jesus Lebrón (Puerto Rico)

15 October 2010
16:00 UTC-04:00

British Virgin Islands	0–10	Dominica
	Report	Joseph 1', 11', 13'; Benjamin 48', 71', 81', 84', 85'; C. Bertrand 55'; Jervier 87'

Estadio Panamericano, San Cristóbal
Attendance: 200
Referee: Javier Santos (Puerto Rico)

17 October 2010
16:00 UTC-04:00

Dominican Republic	0–1	Dominica
	Report	Derrick 71'

Estadio Panamericano, San Cristóbal
Attendance: 600
Referee: Jesus Lebrón (Puerto Rico)

=== Ranking of Group Runners-up ===
The top two second place sides from Groups A, B, and C advanced to Qualifying Stage Two.

Group	Team	Pld	W	D	L	GF	GA	GD	Pts
C	Suriname	3	2	0	1	4	4	0	6
B	Saint Vincent	3	1	2	0	8	1	+7	5
A	Cayman Islands	3	1	1	1	5	4	+1	4

== Second round ==
The 2nd through 7th ranked teams from the 2008 tournament (Jamaica, the 2008 winner, qualified directly to the final round) are automatically qualified for this round: Antigua and Barbuda, Cuba, Grenada, Guadeloupe, Haiti, and Trinidad and Tobago. The three group winners along with the three second-place teams qualified for the Final Tournament.

=== Group E ===
Played in Grenada from 22 to 26 October.

Team	Pld	W	D	L	GF	GA	GD	Pts
Guadeloupe	3	3	0	0	8	3	+5	9
Grenada	3	2	0	1	5	4	+1	6
Saint Kitts and Nevis	3	1	0	2	2	4	-2	3
Puerto Rico	3	0	0	3	3	7	-4	0

22 October 2010
15:00 UTC-04:00

Saint Kitts and Nevis	1–2	Guadeloupe
Francis 83' (pen.)	Report	Gendrey 12'; Lambourde 87'

National Stadium, St. George's
Attendance: 300
Referee: Trevor Taylor (Barbados)
22 October 2010
17:00 UTC-04:00

Grenada	3–1	Puerto Rico
Bain 44', 68'; Charles 80'	Report	Nieves 81'

National Stadium, St. George's
Referee: Enrico Wijngaarde (Suriname)

24 October 2010
15:00 UTC-04:00

Guadeloupe	3–2	Puerto Rico
Gendrey 1'; Gotin 10'; Auvray 58'	Report	Megaloudis 67'; Villegas 78'

National Stadium, St. George's
Attendance: 200
Referee: Ignatius Baptiste (Dominica)
24 October 2010
17:00 UTC-04:00

Grenada	2–0	Saint Kitts and Nevis
Facey 15', 30'	Report

National Stadium, St. George's
Attendance: 4,786
Referee: Kevin Morrison (Jamaica)

26 October 2010
15:00 UTC-04:00

Puerto Rico	0–1	Saint Kitts and Nevis
	Report	Francis 90+1'

National Stadium, St. George's
Referee: Kevin Morrison (Jamaica)
26 October 2010
17:00 UTC-04:00

Grenada	0–3	Guadeloupe
	Report	Tacita 3', 79'; Gendrey 69'

National Stadium, St. George's
Referee: Enrico Wijngaarde (Suriname)

=== Group F ===
Played in Trinidad and Tobago from 2–6 November.

Team	Pld	W	D	L	GF	GA	GD	Pts
Trinidad and Tobago	3	3	0	0	12	3	+9	9
Guyana	3	1	1	1	3	2	+1	4
Haiti	3	1	1	1	3	5	-2	4
Saint Vincent	3	0	0	3	3	11	-8	0

2 November 2010
18:00 UTC-04:00

Haiti	0–0	Guyana
	Report

Manny Ramjohn Stadium, Marabella
Attendance: 1,100
Referee: Trevor Taylor (Barbados)
2 November 2010
20:30 UTC-04:00

Trinidad and Tobago	6–2	Saint Vincent
Jorsling 2', 35', 59'; Baptiste 57', 67'; Hector 90+3'	Report	S. Samuel 21'; Stewart 43'

Manny Ramjohn Stadium, Marabella
Attendance: 1,100
Referee: Dave Peterkin (Jamaica)

4 November 2010
18:00 UTC-04:00

Saint Vincent	1–3	Haiti
S. Samuel 64'	Report	Norde 45'; Saint-Preux 61'; Charles 83'

Manny Ramjohn Stadium, Marabella
Attendance: 1,100
Referee: Courtney Campbell (Jamaica)
4 November 2010
20:30 UTC-04:00

Trinidad and Tobago	2–1	Guyana
Peltier 34'; Jorsling 42'	Report	Beveney 78'

Manny Ramjohn Stadium, Marabella
Attendance: 1,100
Referee: Valdin Legister (Jamaica)

6 November 2010
17:00 UTC-04:00

Guyana	2–0	Saint Vincent
Millington 57'; Cameron 81'	Report

Manny Ramjohn Stadium, Marabella
Attendance: 850
Referee: Trevor Taylor (Barbados)
6 November 2010
19:30 UTC-04:00

Trinidad and Tobago	4–0	Haiti
Hector 4', 31'; Jorsling 7'; Baptiste 29'	Report

Manny Ramjohn Stadium, Marabella
Attendance: 850
Referee: Courtney Campbell (Jamaica)

=== Group G ===
Played in Antigua and Barbuda from 10 to 14 November.

Team	Pld	W	D	L	GF	GA	GD	Pts
Cuba	3	1	2	0	7	5	+2	5
Antigua and Barbuda	3	1	2	0	2	1	+1	5
Suriname	3	1	1	1	9	5	+4	4
Dominica	3	0	1	2	2	9	-7	1

10 November 2010
14:30 UTC-04:00

Cuba	4–2	Dominica
Coroneaux 9'; R. Fernández 20'; Y. Colomé 27'; Hernández 35'	Report	Benjamin 11', 87'

Recreation Ground, St. John's
Attendance: 500
Referee: Stanley Lancaster (Guyana)
10 November 2010
16:30 UTC-04:00

Antigua and Barbuda	2–1	Suriname
Burton 17'; Cochrane 64'	Report	Emanuelson 33'

Recreation Ground, St. John's
Attendance: 4,000
Referee: Kevin Morrison (Jamaica)

12 November 2010
14:30 UTC-04:00

Suriname	3–3	Cuba
Christoph 7'; Rijssel 49'; Garden 81'	Report	Coroneaux 45'; Cervantes 65'; Ramos 88'

Recreation Ground, St. John's
Attendance: 400
Referee: Courtney Campbell (Jamaica)
12 November 2010
16:30 UTC-04:00

Antigua and Barbuda	0–0	Dominica
	Report

Recreation Ground, St. John's
Attendance: 5,637
Referee: Lewin Purser (Jamaica)

14 November 2010
14:30 UTC-04:00

Dominica	0–5	Suriname
	Report	Kwasie 45'; Vlijter 46'; Limón 56'; Emanuelson 75'; Rijssel 87' (pen.)

Recreation Ground, St. John's
Attendance: 500
Referee: Stanley Lancaster (Guyana)
14 November 2010
16:30 UTC-04:00

Antigua and Barbuda	0–0	Cuba
	Report

Recreation Ground, St. John's
Attendance: 500
Referee: Courtney Campbell (Jamaica)
