= Norfran Lazo =

Nicaraguan footballer

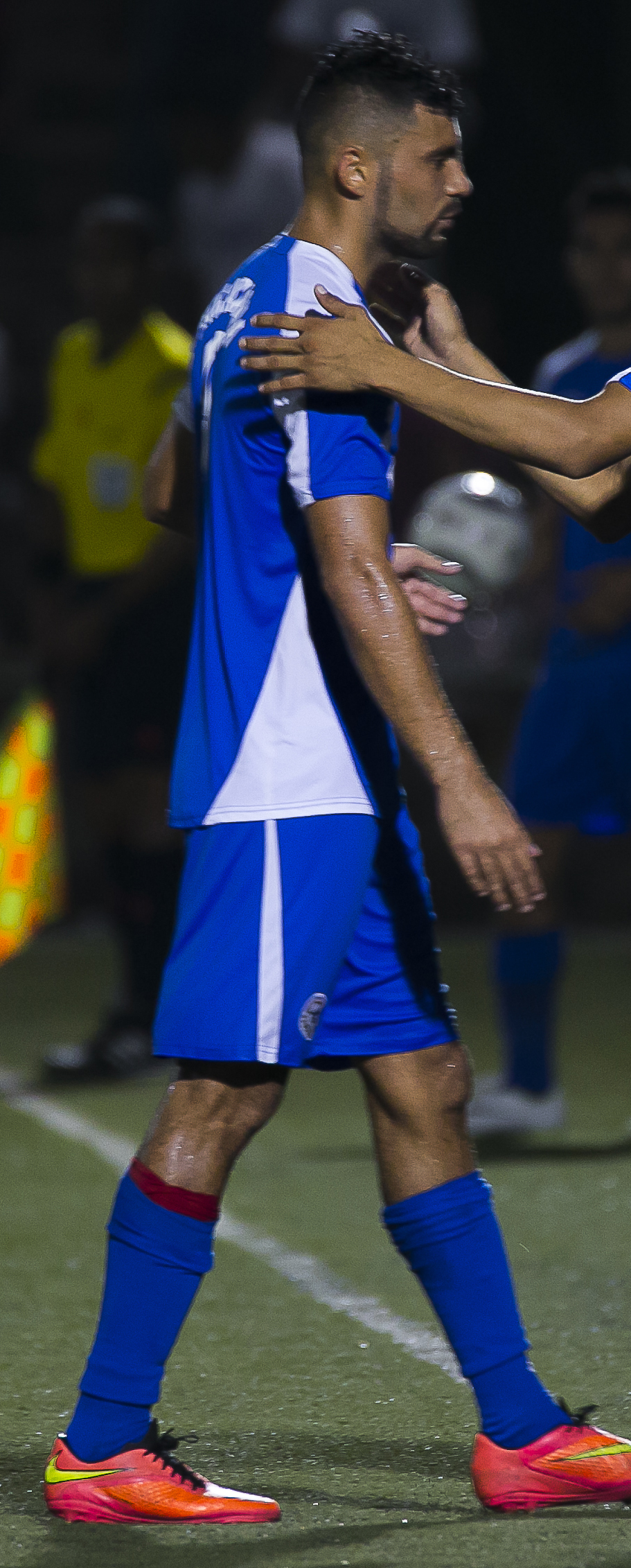

Personal information
- Full name: Norfran Adán Lazo Morales
- Date of birth: 8 September 1990 (age 36)
- Place of birth: Nicaragua
- Position: Striker

Team information
- Current team: Real Estelí
- Number: 24

Senior career*
Years	Team	Apps	(Gls)
2009–2010	Diriangén		
2010–2011	Managua		
2011–2012	Walter Ferretti		
2012–	Real Estelí		

International career
2011–	Nicaragua	16	(1)
- * Club domestic league appearances and goals

Norfran Adán Lazo Morales (born 8 September 1990) is a Nicaraguan footballer who plays for Real Estelí in the Primera División de Nicaragua.

== Club career ==
He previously played for Diriangén, Managua and Walter Ferretti. He left Ferretti in summer 2012 for Real Estelí.

== International career ==
Lazo made his debut for Nicaragua in a January 2011 Copa Centroamericana match against Guatemala and has, as of December 2013, earned a total of 5 caps, scoring no goals. He has represented his country in 2 FIFA World Cup qualification matches and played at the 2011 Copa Centroamericana.

=== International goals ===
Scores and results list the Nicaragua's goal tally first.

#	Date	Venue	Opponent	Score	Result	Competition
1.	23 March 2015	Dennis Martínez National Stadium, Managua, Nicaragua	Anguilla	5–0	5–0	2018 FIFA World Cup qualification
