= Ryan Robbins (footballer) =

Saint Kitts and Nevis footballer

Personal information
- Date of birth: 7 April 1988 (age 38)
- Place of birth: Leicester, England
- Position: Forward

Senior career*
Years	Team	Apps	(Gls)
2010–2013	Coalville Town		
2013	Barwell		
2013	King's Lynn Town		
2013–2015	Stamford	74	(38)
2015–2017	Boston United		
2016	→ Corby Town (loan)		
2017	Gresley		
2017	Barwell		
2017–2018	AFC Rushden & Diamonds	31	(17)
2018–2019	Loughborough Dynamo		
2019	Leicester Nirvana	4	(2)
2019	Corby Town		
2020	St Neot's Town		
2021	Melton Town	15	(6)

International career^{‡}
2015–	Saint Kitts and Nevis	3	(1)
- * Club domestic league appearances and goals as of 14:30, 23 November 2019 (UTC) ‡ National team caps and goals as of 14:30, 23 November 2019 (UTC)

Ryan Robbins (born 7 April 1988) is a Saint Kitts and Nevis footballer who plays as a forward.

== Early life ==
Growing up, Robbins supported Manchester United and idolized Wales international Ryan Giggs.

== Club career ==
In 2010, he signed for Coalville Town. In total, Robbins received four red cards and thirty yellow cards Coalville Town. He helped Coalville Town reach the 2011 FA Vase final and achieve promotion to the Evo-Stik Northern Premier League. During 2012–13, he made forty-eight appearances and scored thirty-four goals.

In 2013, he signed for King's Lynn Town. The move divided fans due to his previous online Twitter arguments with King's Lynn Town supporters while playing for rivals Coalville Town. However, he left due to constant online abuse from King's Lynn Town supporters. After that, Robbins signed for Barwell.

In 2013, he signed for Stamford. He was their top scorer during the 2013–14 and 2014–15 seasons. During 2014–15, Robbins scored during a 3–2 win over Witton Albion to help Stamford avoid relegation on the final day of the season. He finished 2014–15 with twenty-four goals in all competitions. He also helped them win the Lincolnshire Trophy. In 2015, he left Stamford.

In 2015, Robbins signed for Boston United. In total, he made fifteen appearances for Boston United. After that, he returned to Stamford. In November 2016, he left Stamford. In 2016, he returned to Coalville Town. In 2017, he returned to Barwell. After that, he signed for AFC Rushden & Diamonds. Robbins scored a hat-trick for AFC Rushden & Diamonds during a 3–1 win over Kempston Rovers.

In 2018, he signed for Loughborough Dynamo, where he was the third-highest NPL East Division top scorer during 2018–19, before leaving in 2019. On 20 November 2019, Robbins returned to Corby Town from Leicester Nirvana. He had previously spent time on loan at Corby Town for three months in 2016, whilst on loan from Boston United. In 2020, he signed for St Neot's Town. In 2021, he signed for Melton Town. He debuted for Melton Town during a 4–1 loss to Aylestone Park. In total, he made fifteen appearances and scored six goals for Melton Town before departing.

== International career ==
Robbins qualified to represent the Saint Kitts and Nevis national team through his grandparents. He debuted for Saint Kitts and Nevis on 23 March 2015 during a 6–2 win over the Turks and Caicos Islands. He scored his first goal for Saint Kitts and Nevis on 30 March 2015 during a 6–2 win over the Turks and Caicos Islands.

== Style of play ==
Robbins is left-footed and is known for his speed and physicality.

== Personal life ==
Robbins has a son. He is the cousin of Saint Kitts and Nevis international Harry Panayiotou.

== Career statistics ==
No.	Date	Venue	Opponent	Score	Result	Competition	Ref.
1.	26 March 2015	TCIFA National Academy, Providenciales	Turks and Caicos Islands	6–2	6–2	2018 FIFA World Cup qualification	
