= 2018 FIFA World Cup qualification – CONCACAF first round =

Tournament details
- Dates: 22 – 31 March 2015
- Teams: 14 (from 1 confederation)

Tournament statistics
- Matches played: 14
- Goals scored: 51 (3.64 per match)
- Attendance: 35,468 (2,533 per match)
- Top scorer(s): (Bermuda) Nahki Wells (Saint Kitts and Nevis) Harry Panayiotou (3 goals each)

The first round of CONCACAF matches for 2018 FIFA World Cup qualification was played between 22 and 31 March 2015.

== Format ==
A total of 14 teams (teams ranked 22–35 in the CONCACAF entrant list) played home-and-away over two legs. The seven winners advanced to the second round.

== Seeding ==
The draw for the first round was held on 15 January 2015, 19:40 EST (UTC−5), at the W Hotel at Miami Beach, Florida, United States.

The seeding was based on the FIFA World Rankings of August 2014 (shown in parentheses). The 14 teams were seeded into two pots:

- Pot 1 contained the teams ranked 1–7 (i.e., 22–28 in the CONCACAF entrant list).
- Pot 2 contained the teams ranked 8–14 (i.e., 29–35 in the CONCACAF entrant list).

Each tie contained a team from Pot 1 and a team from Pot 2, with the order of legs decided by draw.

Note: Bolded teams qualified for the second round.

Pot 1	Pot 2
1. **Saint Kitts and Nevis** (159); 2. **Belize** (162); 3. Montserrat (165); 4. **Dominica** (168); 5. **Barbados** (169); 6. **Bermuda** (173); 7. **Nicaragua** (175)	8. Turks and Caicos Islands (181); 9. **Curaçao** (182); 10. U.S. Virgin Islands (191); 11. Bahamas (193); 12. Cayman Islands (197); 13. British Virgin Islands (201); 14. Anguilla (207)

== Matches ==
Team 1	Agg.	Team 2	1st leg	2nd leg
Bahamas	0–8	**Bermuda**	0–5	0–3
British Virgin Islands	2–3	**Dominica**	2–3	0–0
**Barbados**	4–1	U.S. Virgin Islands	0–1	4–0
**Saint Kitts and Nevis**	12–4 (Note: Order of legs reversed from originally published draw.)	Turks and Caicos Islands	6–2	6–2
**Nicaragua**	8–0	Anguilla	5–0	3–0
**Belize**	1–1 (a)	Cayman Islands	0–0	1–1
**Curaçao**	4–3	Montserrat	2–1	2–2

25 March 2015
19:30 UTC−4

Bahamas	0–5	Bermuda
	Report (FIFA); Report (CONCACAF)	Leverock 4'; Wells 14' (pen.); Lewis 29'; Donawa 57', 70'

Thomas Robinson Stadium, Nassau
Attendance: 3,500
Referee: Armando Villarreal (United States)
29 March 2015
15:00 UTC−3

Bermuda	3–0	Bahamas
Wells 79', 87'; Burgess 81'	Report (FIFA); Report (CONCACAF)

Bermuda National Stadium, Devonshire
Attendance: 4,370
Referee: Ricardo Montero (Costa Rica)

Bermuda won 8–0 on aggregate and advanced to the second round against Guatemala.

26 March 2015
19:00 UTC−4

British Virgin Islands	2–3	Dominica
E. Moss 42'; Johnson 52'	Report (FIFA); Report (CONCACAF)	Elizee 45+1'; Mit. Joseph 65'; Peltier 80'

Windsor Park, Roseau (Dominica) (Note: Both legs were played in Dominica due to incomplete work at the A. O. Shirley Recreation Ground of the British Virgin Islands.)
Attendance: 1,169
Referee: Karl Tyrell (Jamaica)
29 March 2015
17:00 UTC−4

Dominica	0–0	British Virgin Islands
	Report (FIFA); Report (CONCACAF)

Windsor Park, Roseau
Attendance: 2,661
Referee: Fernando Guerrero (Mexico)

Dominica won 3–2 on aggregate and advanced to the second round against Canada.

22 March 2015
19:00 UTC−4

Barbados	0–1	U.S. Virgin Islands
	Report (FIFA); Report (CONCACAF)	Browne 16'

Barbados National Stadium, Bridgetown
Attendance: 2,300
Referee: Kimbell Ward (Saint Kitts and Nevis)
26 March 2015
15:30 UTC−4

U.S. Virgin Islands	0–4	Barbados
	Report (FIFA); Report (CONCACAF)	Sargeant 4'; Jam. Chandler 25'; Harte 76'; Jab. Chandler 90'

Addelita Cancryn Junior High School Ground, Charlotte Amalie
Attendance: 410
Referee: Kevin Morrison (Jamaica)

Barbados won 4–1 on aggregate and advanced to the second round against Aruba.

23 March 2015
20:00 UTC−4

Saint Kitts and Nevis	6–2	Turks and Caicos Islands
Harris 18'; T. Leader 43'; O. Mitchum 45+3', 90'; Hanley 68'; O'Loughlin 86'	Report (FIFA); Report (CONCACAF)	Forbes 22'; T. Leader 74' (o.g.)

Warner Park, Basseterre
Attendance: 2,000
Referee: Sherwin Moore (Guyana)
26 March 2015
19:00 UTC−4

Turks and Caicos Islands	2–6	Saint Kitts and Nevis
Calixte 5' (pen.), 14' (pen.)	Report (FIFA); Report (CONCACAF)	J. Leader 7', 29'; Panayiotou 33' (pen.), 55', 60'; Robbins 73'

TCIFA National Academy, Providenciales
Attendance: 420
Referee: Elmer Bonilla (El Salvador)

Saint Kitts and Nevis won 12–4 on aggregate and advanced to the second round against El Salvador.

23 March 2015
18:00 UTC−6

Nicaragua	5–0	Anguilla
Galeano 12'; Copete 25', 39'; Barrera 37'; Lazo 63'	Report (FIFA); Report (CONCACAF)

Nicaragua National Football Stadium, Managua
Attendance: 4,214
Referee: Jafeth Perea (Panama)
29 March 2015
17:00 UTC−4

Anguilla	0–3	Nicaragua
	Report (FIFA); Report (CONCACAF)	Leguías 22', 67'; Barrera 45+1'

Ronald Webster Park, The Valley
Attendance: 1,200
Referee: Óscar Moncada (Honduras)

Nicaragua won 8–0 on aggregate and advanced to the second round against Suriname.

25 March 2015
20:00 UTC−6

Belize	0–0	Cayman Islands
	Report (FIFA); Report (CONCACAF)

FFB Stadium, Belmopan
Attendance: 1,924
Referee: Oscar Reyna (Guatemala)
29 March 2015
19:00 UTC−5

Cayman Islands	1–1	Belize
M. Ebanks 5'	Report (FIFA); Report (CONCACAF)	Kuylen 20'

Truman Bodden Sports Complex, George Town
Attendance: 1,800
Referee: Yadel Martínez (Cuba)

1–1 on aggregate. Belize won on the away goals rule and advanced to the second round against Dominican Republic.

27 March 2015
20:00 UTC−4

Curaçao	2–1	Montserrat
Merencia 8'; Zschusschen 39' (pen.)	Report (FIFA); Report (CONCACAF)	Taylor 24'

Ergilio Hato Stadium, Willemstad
Attendance: 9,000
Referee: Óscar Dávila (Nicaragua)
31 March 2015
19:00 UTC−4

Montserrat	2–2	Curaçao
Willer 65'; Woods-Garness 83'	Report (FIFA); Report (CONCACAF)	Lachman 41'; Vicento 89'

Blakes Estate Stadium, St. John's
Attendance: 500
Referee: Rodphin Harris (Trinidad and Tobago)

Curaçao won 4–3 on aggregate and advanced to the second round against Cuba.

== Goalscorers ==
There were 51 goals scored in 14 matches, for an average of 3.64 goals per match.

3 goals

- (Bermuda) Nahki Wells
- (Saint Kitts and Nevis) Harry Panayiotou

2 goals

- (Bermuda) Justin Donawa
- (Nicaragua) Juan Barrera
- (Nicaragua) Luis Copete
- (Nicaragua) Raúl Leguías
- (Saint Kitts and Nevis) Joash Leader
- (Saint Kitts and Nevis) Orlando Mitchum
- (Turks and Caicos Islands) Widlin Calixte

1 goal

- (Barbados) Jabarry Chandler
- (Barbados) Jamal Chandler
- (Barbados) Mario Harte
- (Barbados) Raheim Sargeant
- (Belize) Elroy Kuylen
- (Bermuda) Tyrell Burgess
- (Bermuda) Dante Leverock
- (Bermuda) Zeiko Lewis
- (British Virgin Islands) Edward Moss
- (British Virgin Islands) Jordan Johnson
- (Cayman Islands) Mark Ebanks
- (Curaçao) Darryl Lachman
- (Curaçao) Papito Merencia
- (Curaçao) Charlton Vicento
- (Curaçao) Felitciano Zschusschen
- (Dominica) Glensworth Elizee
- (Dominica) Mitchell Joseph
- (Dominica) Randolph Peltier
- (Montserrat) Lyle Taylor
- (Montserrat) Jamal Willer
- (Montserrat) Bradley Woods-Garness
- (Nicaragua) Luis Galeano
- (Nicaragua) Norfran Lazo
- (Saint Kitts and Nevis) Tishan Hanley
- (Saint Kitts and Nevis) Atiba Harris
- (Saint Kitts and Nevis) Thrizen Leader
- (Saint Kitts and Nevis) Errol O'Loughlin
- (Saint Kitts and Nevis) Ryan Robbins
- (Turks and Caicos Islands) Billy Forbes
- (United States Virgin Islands) Jamie Browne

1 own goal

- (Saint Kitts and Nevis) Thrizen Leader (against Turks and Caicos Islands)
