= Rashad Jules =

Barbadian footballer

Personal information
- Date of birth: 24 June 1992 (age 34)
- Place of birth: Brittons Hill, Barbados
- Height: 1.73 m (5 ft 8 in)
- Position: Midfielder

Team information
- Current team: Kemi Kings
- Number: 11

Senior career*
Years	Team	Apps	(Gls)
2010–2011	Kick Start		
2012	FC Minyor Chicago		
2013–2015	Barbados Defence Force		
2015–2016	Old Road		
2016	Barbados Defence Force		
2016–2017	Old Road		
2017	Barbados Defence Force		
2017	Tulsa Athletic		
2017–2018	Old Road		
2018	Barbados Defence Force		
2019–	Kemi Kings	0	(0)

International career^{‡}
2015–	Barbados	27	(4)
- * Club domestic league appearances and goals as of 16:28, 4 February 2018 (UTC) ‡ National team caps and goals as of 17:30, 15 October 2020 (UTC)

Rashad Jules (born 24 June 1992) is a Barbadian international footballer who plays for Finnish club Kemi Kings as a midfielder.

== Career ==
Born in Brittons Hill, Jules has played for Kick Start, FC Minyor Chicago, Barbados Defence Force, Old Road and Tulsa Athletic.

He made his international debut for Barbados in 2015.

In April 2019, Rashad joined Finnish club Kemi Kings.

=== International goals ===
Scores and results list Barbados' goal tally first.

No.	Date	Venue	Opponent	Score	Result	Competition
1.	27 March 2017	Usain Bolt Sports Complex, Bridgetown, Barbados	Martinique	1–0	2–1	Friendly
2.	27 March 2017	Usain Bolt Sports Complex, Bridgetown, Barbados	Martinique	2–0	2–1	Friendly
3.	7 May 2017	Warner Park Sporting Complex, Basseterre, Saint Kitts and Nevis	Saint Kitts and Nevis	1–1	1–2	Friendly
4.	30 June 2017	Fond Playing Field, Sauteurs, Grenada	Grenada	3–4	3–4	2017 Windward Islands Tournament
5.	8 September 2019	Truman Bodden Sports Complex, George Town, Cayman Islands	Cayman Islands	2–2	2–3	2019–20 CONCACAF Nations League C
6.	15 October 2019	Bethlehem Soccer Stadium, Upper Bethlehem, U.S. Virgin Islands	U.S. Virgin Islands	2–0	4–0	2019–20 CONCACAF Nations League C
