= Paul Brown (Caymanian footballer) =

Caymanian footballer

Personal information
- Full name: Paul Alfredo Brown
- Date of birth: 15 January 1991 (age 35)
- Place of birth: Cayman Islands
- Position: Defender

Team information
- Current team: Future SC

Senior career*
Years	Team	Apps	(Gls)
2008–	Future SC		

International career^{‡}
- Cayman Islands U17
- Cayman Islands U20
2010–	Cayman Islands	4	(2)
- * Club domestic league appearances and goals ‡ National team caps and goals as of 20:54, 23 April 2012 (UTC)

Paul Alfredo Brown (born 15 January 1991) is a Caymanian footballer who plays as a defender. He represented the Cayman Islands three times at the 2010 Caribbean Championship, scoring two goals.

== International career ==
#	Date	Venue	Opponent	Result	Competition
1.	2 October 2010	Estadio Juán Rámon Loubriel, Bayamón, Puerto Rico	Saint Martin	1–1	Caribbean Championship
2.	4 October 2010	Estadio Juán Rámon Loubriel, Bayamón, Puerto Rico	Anguilla	4–1	Caribbean Championship
3.	7 October 2010	Estadio Juán Rámon Loubriel, Bayamón, Puerto Rico	Puerto Rico	2–0	Caribbean Championship
