= Terry Adamson =

English footballer (born 1948)

Personal information
- Full name: Terence Adamson
- Date of birth: 15 October 1948 (age 78)
- Place of birth: Houghton-le-Spring, England
- Position: Defender

Senior career*
Years	Team	Apps	(Gls)
1965–1966	Sunderland	0	(0)
1966–1967	Luton Town	2	(0)
1967–1968	Hartlepools United	1	(0)
- Scarborough
- Murton
- * Club domestic league appearances and goals

Terence Adamson (born 15 October 1948) is an English former professional footballer who played in the Football League as a defender for Luton Town and Hartlepools United.
