= Jamal Chandler =

Barbadian international footballer

Personal information
- Full name: Jamal Chandler
- Date of birth: 26 November 1989 (age 36)
- Place of birth: Barbados
- Height: 1.82 m (6 ft 0 in)
- Position: Midfielder

Team information
- Current team: Barbados Defence Force

Senior career*
Years	Team	Apps	(Gls)
- Barbados Defence Force
2014–	Paradise		

International career
2009–	Barbados	15	(3)
- * Club domestic league appearances and goals

Jamal Chandler (born 26 November 1989) is a Barbadian international footballer who plays as a midfielder. He is currently playing for Paradise.

== International career ==
=== International goals ===
Scores and results list the Barbados's goal tally first.

#	Date	Venue	Opponent	Score	Result	Competition
1.	8 February 2009	Barbados National Stadium, Bridgetown	Grenada	5–0	5–0	Friendly
2.	6 March 2015	Barbados National Stadium, Bridgetown	Saint Vincent and the Grenadines	2–0	3–1	Friendly
3.	26 March 2015	Addelita Cancryn Junior High School Ground, Charlotte Amalie, United States Virgin Islands	U.S. Virgin Islands	2–0	4–0	2018 FIFA World Cup qualification – CONCACAF first round
