= 2001 Windward Islands Tournament =

Tournament details
- Host country: Grenada
- Dates: 12–18 April 2001
- Teams: 4

The 2001 Windward Islands Tournament was an international football tournament hosted in Grenada in April 2001.

== Group stage ==
Final table

| Pos | Team | Pld | W | D | L | GF | GA | GD | Pts |
|---|---|---|---|---|---|---|---|---|---|
| 1 | Grenada | 3 | 2 | 1 | 0 | 13 | 7 | 6 | 7 |
| 2 | Saint Vincent & Grenadines | 3 | 2 | 1 | 0 | 5 | 1 | 4 | 7 |
| 3 | Saint Lucia | 3 | 0 | 1 | 2 | 3 | 6 | -3 | 1 |
| 4 | Dominica | 3 | 0 | 1 | 2 | 3 | 10 | -7 | 1 |

Results

12 April 2001

| Saint Vincent and the Grenadines | 2–0 | Saint Lucia |

Saint Georges
12 April 2001

| Grenada | 8–3 | Dominica |

Saint Georges
14 April 2001

| Saint Vincent and the Grenadines | 2–0 | Dominica |

Saint Georges
14 April 2001

| Grenada | 4–3 | Saint Lucia |

Saint Georges
16 April 2001

| Saint Lucia | 0–0 | Dominica |

Saint Georges
16 April 2001

| Grenada | 1–1 | Saint Vincent and the Grenadines |

Saint Georges

== Third place play-off ==
18 April 2001

| Saint Lucia | 1–0 | Dominica |

Saint Georges

== Final ==
18 April 2001

| Grenada | 2–0 | Saint Vincent and the Grenadines |

Saint Georges
