= John Parris (footballer) =

Barbadian footballer (born 1974)

Personal information
- Date of birth: 26 April 1974 (age 52)
- Position: Midfielder

Team information
- Current team: Notre Dame

Senior career*
Years	Team	Apps	(Gls)
2001–	Notre Dame		

International career^{‡}
2000–2011	Barbados	64	(4)
- * Club domestic league appearances and goals as of 7 May 2011 ‡ National team caps and goals as of 26 April 2017

John Parris (born 26 April 1974) is a Barbadian international footballer who plays club football for Notre Dame, as a midfielder.

== International ==
=== International goals ===
Scores and results list Barbados' goal tally first.

No	Date	Venue	Opponent	Score	Result	Competition
1.	1 January 2004	Bermuda National Stadium, Hamilton, Bermuda	Bermuda	1–0	4–0	Friendly
2.	10 September 2006	Barbados National Stadium, St. Michael, Barbados	Saint Vincent and the Grenadines	1–0	1–1	Friendly
3.	5 November 2006	Carlton Club Ground, Bridgetown, Barbados	Grenada	1–1	2–2	Friendly
4.	27 October 2008	Estadio Pedro Marrero, Havana, Cuba	Netherlands Antilles	2–0	2–1	2008 Caribbean Cup qualification
