= Chad Bertrand =

Dominican association football player

Personal information
- Date of birth: 19 December 1986 (age 39)
- Place of birth: Dominica
- Height: 1.85 m (6 ft 1 in)
- Position: Midfielder

Team information
- Current team: Solidarité-Scolaire

Senior career*
Years	Team	Apps	(Gls)
2009	London City		
2010	Sporting Clube De Goa		
2011–2014	Bath Estate		
2014–2017	Dublanc FC		
2017–	Solidarité-Scolaire		

International career^{‡}
2010–	Dominica	54	(7)
- * Club domestic league appearances and goals as of 9 March 2019 ‡ National team caps and goals as of 7 September 2024

Chad Bertrand (born 19 December 1986) is a Dominican footballer who plays as a midfielder for Guadeloupe Division of Honor club Solidarité-Scolaire and the Dominica national team.

== Club career ==
Chad Bertrand played with London City of the Canadian Soccer League in 2009. In 2010, he went across the ocean to India to play with SC Goa in the I-League 2nd Division. The following season, he returned home to play with Bath Estate in the Dominica Premier League. In 2014, he signed with rivals Dublanc FC, where he won the title league in the 2015-2016 season. In 2017, he played abroad in the Guadeloupe Division of Honor with Solidarité-Scolaire.

== International career ==
Chad Bertrand made his international debut in September 2011 against Bermuda, scoring his first goal against the British Virgin Islands in October 2011.

== Career statistics ==
Scores and results list Dominica's goal tally first, score column indicates score after each Bertrand goal.

List of international goals scored by Chad Bertrand
No.	Date	Venue	Opponent	Score	Result	Competition
1	15 October 2010	Estadio Panamericano, San Cristóbal, Dominican Republic	British Virgin Islands	5–0	10–0	2010 Caribbean Cup qualification
2	25 September 2012	Kensington Oval, Bridgetown, Barbados	Aruba	1–0	3–2	2012 Caribbean Cup qualification
3	26 March 2016	A.O. Shirley Recreation Ground, Road Town, British Virgin Islands	British Virgin Islands	4–0	7–0	2017 Caribbean Cup qualification
4	29 March 2016	Windsor Park, Roseau, Dominica	Martinique	1–2	1–4	2017 Caribbean Cup qualification
5	2 June 2021	Félix Sánchez Olympic Stadium, Santo Domingo, Dominican Republic	Anguilla	2–0	3–0	2022 FIFA World Cup qualification
6	2 May 2024	Victoria Park, Kingstown, Saint Vincent and the Grenadines	Saint Vincent and the Grenadines	1–1	3–1	Friendly
7	7 September 2024	ABFA Technical Center, Piggotts, Antigua ans Barbuda	Antigua and Barbuda	1–0	2–1	2024–25 CONCACAF Nations League B
