= Raheim Sargeant =

Barbadian footballer (born 1992)

Personal information
- Full name: Raheim Sargeant
- Date of birth: 9 June 1992 (age 34)
- Place of birth: Barbados
- Height: 1.70 m (5 ft 7 in)
- Position: Midfielder

Team information
- Current team: Lancaster City

Senior career*
Years	Team	Apps	(Gls)
- Barbados Defence Force
2014–	Lancaster City		

International career^{‡}
2010–	Barbados	41	(3)
- * Club domestic league appearances and goals ‡ National team caps and goals as of 18 November 2018

Raheim Sargeant (born 9 June 1992) is a Barbadian international footballer who plays as a midfielder. He is currently playing for Lancaster City.

== Club career ==
In September 2014 he signed a contract with English club Lancaster City.

== International career ==
Sargeant has been capped by Barbados, making his debut in 2010 in a friendly match against Dominica. Between 2010 and 2014, he made ten appearances for the national side, including three appearances in the 2012 Caribbean Cup against Dominica, Dominican Republic and Aruba.

=== International goals ===
Scores and results list the Barbados's goal tally first.

#	Date	Venue	Opponent	Score	Result	Competition
1.	26 March 2015	Addelita Cancryn Junior High School Ground, Charlotte Amalie	U.S. Virgin Islands	1–0	4–0	2018 FIFA World Cup qualification
2.	30 September 2018	Chili Playing Field, Georgetown, Saint Vincent and the Grenadines	Saint Vincent and the Grenadines	1–1	1–1	Friendly
3.	18 November 2018	Wildey Astro Turf, Wildey, Barbados	U.S. Virgin Islands	2–0	3–0	2019–20 CONCACAF Nations League qualification
