= Usain Bolt Sports Complex =

Sports venue in Barbados

Coordinates: 13.137727°N 59.633226°W

Usain Bolt Sports Complex is a sports venue at the Cavehill campus of the University of the West Indies in Barbados consisting of an IAAF certified track and FIFA certified football field. The complex comprises the Ryan Brathwaite track, the Obadele Thompson stand and the Kirani James stand, all prominent Caribbean athletes.

The naming of the sports complex was criticized by some Barbadians for being named after a Jamaican athlete, Usain Bolt instead of a Barbadian athlete. University principal, Sir Hilary Beckles said that the naming did not intend to marginalize Barbadian sportspeople and the decision was intended to be a move that meant to "celebrate all West Indians". He also added that the university is not solely Barbadian thus "a debate over Barbadian, Jamaican or Trinidadian" should not have been raised.
