= Chris Bourne =

Footballer (born 1985)

Personal information
- Date of birth: 6 September 1985 (age 41)
- Place of birth: Basildon, England
- Positions: Left back; midfielder

Team information
- Current team: Harlow Town

Youth career
- Southend United

Senior career*
Years	Team	Apps	(Gls)
2006–2008	Canvey Island	69	(0)
- → Billericay Town (loan)
- → Welling United (loan)
2008	Brentwood Town	4	(0)
2008–2009	Heybridge Swifts	24	(1)
2009	Staines Town		
2010	Croydon Athletic		
2010–2012	Metropolitan Police		
2012	Concord Rangers		
2012–2013	Metropolitan Police	0	(0)
2013	AFC Hornchurch	25	(3)
2013–2014	East Thurrock United	8	(0)
2014–2015	AFC Hornchurch	41	(3)
2015–2016	Billericay Town		
2017	Hadley		
2017–2018	Canvey Island	22	(1)
2018–2019	Aveley	22	(1)
2019–2020	Grays Athletic	1	(0)
2020–202?	Harlow Town	?	(?)

International career^{‡}
2008–	Guyana	25	(2)
- * Club domestic league appearances and goals ‡ National team caps and goals as of 15:12, 24 December 2020 (UTC)

Chris Bourne (born 6 September 1985) is an English-born Guyanan footballer who played as a left-back or midfielder. Born in England, he has represented the Guyana national team internationally.

== Club career ==
Bourne started his football career at the age of 12, as a goalkeeper in his school team before moving out on pitch.

He has played for non-League teams, Canvey Island, Billericay Town, Welling United, Brentwood Town, Heybridge Swifts and Croydon Athletic.

== International career ==
Bourne made his international debut for Guyana against Cuba at MacKenzie Sports Club Ground, Linden on 22 January 2008. His second cap came two days later, against Cuba at Georgetown Cricket Club Ground, Georgetown.

== Personal life ==
His father, Gary, is also a footballer, having previously played for Millwall. Bourne also manages an amateur Sunday league football side, FC Gulls.

== Career statistics ==
#	Date	Venue	Opponent	Score	Result	Competition
1.	12 October 2010	Paramaribo	Saint Lucia	1–0	Win	2010 Caribbean Championship
