= Kadeem Atkins =

Barbadian international footballer

Personal information
- Date of birth: 30 November 1991 (age 34)
- Position: Midfielder

Team information
- Current team: Barbados Defence Force

Senior career*
Years	Team	Apps	(Gls)
2010	Deacons		
2011–	Barbados Defence Force		

International career^{‡}
2010–2011	Barbados	7	(3)
- * Club domestic league appearances and goals as of 17:08, 4 February 2018 (UTC) ‡ National team caps and goals as of 17:08, 4 February 2018 (UTC)

Kadeem Atkins (born 30 November 1991) is a Barbadian international footballer who plays for Barbados Defence Force, as a midfielder.

== Career ==
Atkins has played for Deacons and Barbados Defence Force.

He made his international debut for Barbados in 2010, and has appeared in FIFA World Cup qualifying matches.
