= Kurlson Benjamin =

Dominican footballer (born 1984)

Personal information
- Full name: Kurlson Benjamin
- Date of birth: 7 December 1984 (age 41)
- Place of birth: Dominica
- Position: Striker

Senior career*
Years	Team	Apps	(Gls)
2007–	Bath Estate		
2010	Alpha United		

International career^{‡}
2008–	Dominica	23	(14)
- * Club domestic league appearances and goals ‡ National team caps and goals as of 12 April 2011

Kurlson Benjamin (born 7 December 1984) is a Dominican professional footballer who plays as a striker for Bath Estate and the Dominica national team.

He plays as a striker.

== Club career ==
Born in Dominica, he joined Bath Estate in 2007.

Near the end of 2010 he played in Guyana's Kashif and Shanghai cup competition for Alpha United as a guest player alongside Grenada international Kithson Bain.

== International career ==
He made his debut for Dominica on 18 January 2008 against Guadeloupe. It took him until his fourth game to score, when he netted in a 4–0 win over the British Virgin Islands. He netted his second goal, in a 2–0 win over Barbados in a friendly. Just a day later he scored all three of Dominica's goals as he scored a hat-trick against the same team. On 15 October 2010, he scored five in a 10–0 win over the British Virgin Islands in the Caribbean Cup, he scored another two later in the tournament as Dominica were beaten 4–2 by Cuba.

=== International goals ===
Scores and results list Dominica's goal tally first.

#	Date	Venue	Opponent	Score	Result	Competition
1.	5 December 2009	Windsor Park, Roseau	British Virgin Islands	3–0	4–0	Friendly
2.	25 September 2010	Barbados National Stadium, Bridgetown	Barbados	1–0	2–0	Friendly
3.	26 September 2010	Barbados National Stadium, Bridgetown	Barbados	1–1	3–1	Friendly
4.	26 September 2010	Barbados National Stadium, Bridgetown	Barbados	2–1	3–1	Friendly
5.	26 September 2010	Barbados National Stadium, Bridgetown	Barbados	3–1	3–1	Friendly
6.	15 October 2010	Estadio Panamericano, San Cristóbal	British Virgin Islands	4–0	10–0	2010 Caribbean Cup qualifier
7.	15 October 2010	Estadio Panamericano, San Cristóbal	British Virgin Islands	6–0	10–0	2010 Caribbean Cup qualifier
8.	15 October 2010	Estadio Panamericano, San Cristóbal	British Virgin Islands	7–0	10–0	2010 Caribbean Cup qualifier
9.	15 October 2010	Estadio Panamericano, San Cristóbal	British Virgin Islands	8–0	10–0	2010 Caribbean Cup qualifier
10.	15 October 2010	Estadio Panamericano, San Cristóbal	British Virgin Islands	9–0	10–0	2010 Caribbean Cup qualifier
11.	10 November 2010	Antigua Recreation Ground, Saint John's	Cuba	1–1	2–4	2010 Caribbean Cup qualifier
12.	10 November 2010	Antigua Recreation Ground, Saint John's	Cuba	2–4	2–4	2010 Caribbean Cup qualifier
13.	25 September 2012	Kensington Oval, Bridgetown	Aruba	2–1	3–2	2012 Caribbean Cup qualifier
14.	25 September 2012	Kensington Oval, Bridgetown	Aruba	3–2	3–2	2012 Caribbean Cup qualifier

== Honours ==
Bath Estate

- DFA Premier League: 2013
