= Mitchell Joseph =

Dominica footballer

Personal information
- Full name: Mitchell Joseph
- Date of birth: 2 September 1986 (age 40)
- Place of birth: Dominica
- Position: Striker

Senior career*
Years	Team	Apps	(Gls)
????–2015	Bath Estate		

International career^{‡}
2008–2015	Dominica	20	(5)
- * Club domestic league appearances and goals ‡ National team caps and goals as of 13 March 2015

Mitchell Joseph (born 2 September 1986, in Dominica) is a footballer who plays as a striker for the Dominica national football team.

== International Goals ==
Scores and results list Dominica's goal tally first.

#	Date	Venue	Opponent	Score	Result	Competition
1	25 September 2010	Barbados National Stadium, St Michael, Barbados	Barbados	2–0	2–0	Friendly
2	15 October 2010	Estadio Panamericano, San Cristóbal, Dominican Republic	British Virgin Islands	1–0	10–0	2010 Caribbean Cup qualification
3	15 October 2010	Estadio Panamericano, San Cristóbal, Dominican Republic	British Virgin Islands	2–0	10–0	2010 Caribbean Cup qualification
4	15 October 2010	Estadio Panamericano, San Cristóbal, Dominican Republic	British Virgin Islands	3–0	10–0	2010 Caribbean Cup qualification
5	26 March 2015	Windsor Park, Roseau, Dominica	British Virgin Islands	2–2	3–2	2018 FIFA World Cup qualification
