= Barbados national football team results (2020–present) =

The Barbados national football team represents Barbados in international association football under the control of the Barbados Football Association (BFA).

The following list contains all results of Barbados's official matches since 2020.

== Key ==
The coloured backgrounds denote the result of the match:

– indicates Barbados won the match
– indicates Barbados's opposition won the match
– indicates the match ended in a draw

== Results ==
=== 2020 ===
7 January Friendly	Canada	4–1	Barbados	Irvine, California, United States
	Ricketts 7'; Akindele 34'; Osorio 46'; Bair 77'	Report	36' (pen.) Lashley	Stadium: Orange County Great Park

10 January Friendly	Canada	4–1	Barbados	Irvine, California, United States
	Brym 10'; Teibert 36'; Fraser 64'; Nelson 86'	Report	70' Edwards	Stadium: Orange County Great Park

=== 2021 ===
19 March Friendly	Turks and Caicos (Turks and Caicos Islands)	0–2	Barbados	Punta Cana, Dominican Republic
		Report	21' Jules; 59' Gittens	Stadium: Cap Cana Sports City

21 March Friendly	Turks and Caicos (Turks and Caicos Islands)	0–5	Barbados	Punta Cana, Dominican Republic
		Report		Stadium: Cap Cana Sports City

25 March 2022 FIFA World Cup qualification	Panama	1–0	Barbados	Santo Domingo, Dominican Republic
	Catuy 82'	Report		Stadium: Estadio Olímpico Félix Sánchez

30 March 2022 FIFA World Cup qualification	Anguilla	0–1	Barbados	Santo Domingo, Dominican Republic
		Report	81' Saimovici	Stadium: Estadio Olímpico Félix Sánchez

4 June 2022 FIFA World Cup qualification	Dominican Republic	1–1	Barbados	Santo Domingo, Dominican Republic
	Rodríguez 90+2'	Report	42' Reid-Stephen	Stadium: Estadio Olímpico Félix Sánchez

8 June 2022 FIFA World Cup qualification	Dominica	1–1	Barbados	Santo Domingo, Dominican Republic
	Wade 57'	Report	47' Saimovici	Stadium: Estadio Olímpico Félix Sánchez

2 July 2021 CONCACAF Gold Cup qualification	Bermuda	8–1	Barbados	Fort Lauderdale, United States
	Wells 1', 14', 87' (pen.); Lambe 29'; Leverock 39'; Pearce 60' (o.g.); Crichlow 66'; Lewis 67'	Report	46' Holligan	Stadium: DRV PNK Stadium

=== 2022 ===
28 January Friendly	Suriname	1–0	Barbados	Paramaribo, Suriname
	Rigters 47'	Report		Stadium: Dr. Ir. Franklin Essed Stadion

30 January Friendly	Guyana	0–0	Barbados	Paramaribo, Suriname
		Report		Stadium: Dr. Ir. Franklin Essed Stadion

22 February Friendly	Martinique	3–1	Barbados	Fort-de-France, Martinique
	Michalet 38'; Phaëton 43'; Rabathaly 85'	Report	32' Atkins	Stadium: Stade Pierre Aliker

25 March Friendly	Trinidad and Tobago	9–0	Barbados	Port of Spain, Trinidad and Tobago
19:00	García 27', 35', 40'; Telfer 29', 60'; Dillon 68', 78'; Moore 80'; Rochford 83'	Report		Stadium: Hasely Crawford Stadium

27 March Friendly	Guyana	5–0	Barbados	Port of Spain, Trinidad and Tobago
	Adams 11'; Schultz 37'; Glasgow 43', 60'; Danns 48' (pen.)	Report		Stadium: Hasely Crawford Stadium

3 June 2022–23 Nations League	Antigua and Barbuda	1–0	Barbados	Gros Islet, Saint Lucia
19:30 (UTC−4)	Philip 90+1'	Report		Stadium: Daren Sammy Cricket Ground; Referee: Moeth Gaymes (Saint Vincent and the Grenadines)

6 June 2022–23 Nations League	Cuba	3–0	Barbados	Santiago de Cuba, Cuba
16:00 (UTC−4)	Pozo 35'; Hernández 38'; Paradela 47' (pen.)	Report		Stadium: Estadio Antonio Maceo; Referee: Marco Ortíz (Mexico)

9 June 2022–23 Nations League	Guadeloupe	1–0	Barbados	Gros Islet, Saint Lucia
18:00 (UTC−4)	Ambrose 16'	Report		Stadium: Daren Sammy Cricket Ground; Referee: Raúl Castro (Honduras)

13 June 2022–23 Nations League	Guadeloupe	2–1	Barbados	Les Abymes, Guadeloupe
18:00 (UTC−4)	Ambrose 6'; Phaëton 27'	Report	59' Atkins	Stadium: Stade René Serge Nabajoth; Referee: Melvin Matamoros (Honduras)

=== 2023 ===
22 February Friendly	Grenada	1–1	Barbados	Sauteurs, Grenada
19:00 UTC−4	Charles 90+1' (pen.)	Report	90+3' James	Stadium: Fond Playing Field; Referee: Moet Gaymes (Saint Vincent and the Grenadines)

24 February Friendly	Grenada	2–2	Barbados	St. George's, Grenada
19:00 UTC−4	Julien 40' (pen.); Isaac 83' (pen.)	Report	19', 71' James	Stadium: Kirani James Athletic Stadium; Referee: Reon Radix (Grenada)

26 February Friendly	Grenada	2–2	Barbados	St. George's, Grenada
16:00 UTC−4	Charles 28'; Isaac 75'	Report	25' Lashley; 88' Butcher	Stadium: Kirani James Athletic Stadium; Referee: Moet Gaymes (Saint Vincent and the Grenadines)

23 March 2022–23 Nations League	Barbados	0–1	Cuba	Wildey, Barbados
19:00 UTC−4		Report	3' Reyes	Stadium: Wildey Turf; Referee: Walter López (Guatemala)

26 March 2022–23 Nations League	Antigua and Barbuda	1–2	Barbados	North Sound, Antigua and Barbuda
16:00 UTC−4	Weston 31'	Report	62' Gale; 87' James	Stadium: Sir Vivian Richards Stadium; Referee: Ismael Cornejo (El Salvador)

8 September 2023–24 Nations League	Barbados	2–3	Montserrat	Wildey, Barbados
19:00 UTC−4	Downey 8'; Gale 26'	Report	6', 90+8' Taylor; 81' (o.g.) Codrington	Stadium: Wildey Turf; Referee: Ken Pennyfeather (Antigua and Barbuda)

11 September 2023–24 Nations League	Nicaragua	5–1	Barbados	Managua, Nicaragua
20:00 UTC−6	Smith 11'; Pérez 40'; Moreno 45+1', 76'; Montes 69'	Report	89' Gale	Stadium: Estadio Nacional; Referee: Bryan López (Guatemala)

13 October 2023–24 Nations League	Barbados	0–5	Dominican Republic	Wildey, Barbados
20:00 UTC−4		Report	7' Romero; 21' Reyes; 45' (o.g.) Griffith; 57' Mörschel; 88' Alba	Stadium: Wildey Turf; Attendance: 1,215; Referee: Benjamin Whitty (Cayman Islands)

16 October 2023–24 Nations League	Dominican Republic	5–2	Barbados	Santiago de los Caballeros, Dominican Republic
22:00 UTC−4	Alba 17'; Romero 30', 48', 79'; Mörschel 59'	Report	10' (pen.), 66' (pen.) Gale	Stadium: Cibao FC Stadium; Attendance: 350; Referee: Nima Saghafi (United States)

17 November 2023–24 Nations League	Barbados	0–4	Nicaragua	Wildey, Barbados
19:00 UTC−4		Report	22' (pen.) Arteaga; 43' Rodríguez; 55' Coronel; 59' Montes	Stadium: Wildey Turf; Referee: Kwinsi Williams (Trinidad and Tobago)

20 November 2023–24 Nations League	Montserrat	4–2	Barbados	Lookout, Montserrat
15:00 UTC−4	Barzey 33'; Dyer 35'; Daniels 62'; Richmond 88'	Report	47' Jules; 90+4' James	Stadium: Blakes Estate Stadium; Referee: Moeth Gaymes (Saint Vincent and the Grenadines)

=== 2024 ===
5 June 2026 FIFA World Cup qualification	Curaçao	4–1	Barbados	Willemstad, Curaçao
19:30 UTC−4	Janga 25', 62', 86' (pen.); Kastaneer 90+2'	Report	90+2' (pen.) Reid-Stephen	Stadium: Ergilio Hato Stadium; Attendance: 4,254; Referee: Iván Barton (El Salvador)

9 June 2026 FIFA World Cup qualification	Barbados	1–3	Haiti	Wildey, Barbados
17:00 UTC−4	Reid-Stephen 73'	Report	12' Deedson; 45+1' Lacroix; 84' Labissiere	Stadium: Wildey Turf; Referee: Keylor Herrera (Costa Rica)

7 September 2024–25 Nations League C	Bahamas	2–3	Barbados	Upper Bethlehem, United States Virgin Islands
16:00 UTC−4	Adderley 42', 66'	Report	10' Z. Applewhite; 80' Taylor; 82' A. Applewhaite	Stadium: Bethlehem Soccer Stadium; Referee: Shavin Greene (Guyana)

10 September 2024–25 Nations League C	Barbados	3–0	U.S. Virgin Islands	Upper Bethlehem, United States Virgin Islands
16:00 UTC−4	Hinkson 15'; Reid-Stephen 86', 90+3'	Report		Stadium: Bethlehem Soccer Stadium; Referee: Sergio Rozenhout (Suriname)

9 October 2024–25 Nations League C	U.S. Virgin Islands	0–5	Barbados	Wildey, Barbados
20:00 UTC−4		Report	42' Holligan; 45+2' (pen.), 47', 65' Reid-Stephen; 90+2' Leacock	Stadium: Wildey Turf; Referee: José Valladares (Honduras)

15 October 2024–25 Nations League C	Barbados	6–2	Bahamas	Wildey, Barbados
20:00 UTC−4	Applewhaite 8', 52'; Reid-Stephen 14' (pen.); Hoyte 26', 64'; Leacock 47'	Report	6' Adderley; 43' (o.g.) Brathwaite	Stadium: Wildey Turf; Referee: Micheal Akangou (Cayman Islands)

15 November 2024–25 Nations League	Barbados	1–4	Guyana	Wildey, Barbados
19:00 UTC−4	Reid-Stephen 17'	Report	26', 59' Glasgow; 60' De Rosario; 90+2' George	Stadium: Wildey Turf; Attendance: 928; Referee: Odette Hamilton (Jamaica)

19 November 2024–25 Nations League	Guyana	5–3	Barbados	Leonora, Guyana
20:00 UTC−4	De Rosario 27', 41', 45+2'; Glasgow 57'; Jones 90+4'	Report	49', 67' Gale; 63' Reid-Stephen	Stadium: Synthetic Track and Field Facility; Referee: Selvin Brown (Honduras)

=== 2025 ===
8 May Friendly	Dominica	0–0	Barbados	Roseau, Dominica
19:00 UTC−4		Report		Stadium: Dfa Technical Centre

4 June 2026 FIFA World Cup qualification	Barbados	1–1	Aruba	Wildey, Barbados
17:00 UTC−4	Leacock 7' (pen.)	Report	15' Luydens	Stadium: Wildey Turf; Referee: Andrew Samuel (Trinidad and Tobago)

10 June 2026 FIFA World Cup qualification	Saint Lucia	2–1	Barbados	Gros Islet, Saint Lucia
18:00 UTC−4	Elva 42' (pen.), 90' (pen.)	Report	12' Richards	Stadium: Daren Sammy Cricket Ground; Attendance: 144; Referee: Sergio Reyna (Guatemala)

12 November 2025–26 CONCACAF Series	Barbados	3–2	Bonaire	North Sound, Antigua and Barbuda
16:00 UTC−4	Oughterson 10', 45+1'; Applewhaite 34'	Report	55' Cicilia; 90' Gerardo-Felicia	Stadium: Sir Vivian Richards Stadium

15 November 2025–26 CONCACAF Series	Barbados	0–3	Aruba	North Sound, Antigua and Barbuda
16:00 UTC−4		Report	4' Poulina; 59' Romano; 76' Fermina	Stadium: Sir Vivian Richards Stadium; Referee: Evens Julmis (Bahamas)

=== 2026 ===
26 March 2025–26 CONCACAF Series	Saint Martin	3–1	Barbados	Rincon, Bonaire
16:00 UTC−4	Léo 56', 57'; Williams 87' (o.g.)	Report	Oughterson 85'	Stadium: Stadion Antonio Trenidat; Referee: Shekiel Jokil (Suriname)

29 March 2025–26 CONCACAF Series	Barbados	2–3	Saint Vincent and the Grenadines	Rincon, Bonaire
16:00 UTC−4	Banton 51'; Oughterson 59'	Report	Franklyn 28'; Solomon 38'; Anderson 78'	Stadium: Stadion Antonio Trenidat; Referee: Evens Julmis (Bahamas)

== See also ==
- Barbados national football team results (2000–2019)
