= Belize national football team results =

Belize national football team fixtures and results.

== Key ==
Key to matches

- Att. = Match attendance
- (H) = Home ground
- (A) = Away ground
- (N) = Neutral venue
- — = Match attendance not known

Key to record by opponent

- P = Games played
- W = Games won
- D = Games drawn
- L = Games lost
- GF = Goals for
- GA = Goals against

== Results ==
Date	Location	Opponents	Score^{[A]}	Competition	Att.	Belize scorers
as British Honduras
19 February 1928	British Honduras (H)	Honduras	1–0	Friendly		
1 April 1963	British Honduras (H)	Jamaica	2–2	Friendly		
as Belize
29 November 1995	El Salvador (A)	El Salvador	0–3	1995 UNCAF Nations Cup		
1 December 1995	El Salvador (N)	Costa Rica	1–2	1995 UNCAF Nations Cup		McCaulay 27'
2 June 1996	Belize (H)	Panama	1–2	1998 FIFA World Cup qualification	2,000	McCaulay 28'
9 June 1996	Panama (A)	Panama	1–4	1998 FIFA World Cup qualification	17,500	Casey 60'
23 March 1997	Panama (A)	Panama	1–1	1997 UNCAF Nations Cup		Prat 78'
30 March 1997	Belize (H)	Panama	0–1	1997 UNCAF Nations Cup		
17 March 1999	Costa Rica (N)	Costa Rica	0–7	1999 UNCAF Nations Cup		
19 March 1999	Costa Rica (N)	Honduras	1–5	1999 UNCAF Nations Cup		Garcia 57'
5 March 2000	El Salvador (A)	El Salvador	0–5	2002 FIFA World Cup qualification	14,567	
19 March 2000	Honduras (N)	Guatemala	1–2	2002 FIFA World Cup qualification	2,500	E. Nuñez 40'
16 April 2000	Belize (H)	El Salvador	1–3	2002 FIFA World Cup qualification	5,000	N. Nuñez 66'
19 May 2000	Honduras (N)	Guatemala	0–0	2002 FIFA World Cup qualification	3,500	
24 April 2001	Belize (H)	Nicaragua	2–0	Friendly		Symms; N. Nuñez
26 April 2001	Belize (H)	Nicaragua	2–1	Friendly		Symms; Zuniga
23 May 2001	Honduras (N)	Costa Rica	0–4	2001 UNCAF Nations Cup		
25 May 2001	Honduras (N)	Guatemala	3–3	2001 UNCAF Nations Cup		Frazer 33', 43'; Leslie 58'
24 June 2001	Belize (H)	Cuba	3–2	Friendly		Norberto 52'; Esquivel 78', 82'
27 March 2002	Belize (H)	Guyana	3–1	Friendly		Celiz 27'; Burgess 35'; Frazer 75'
17 April 2002	Belize (H)	Nicaragua	7–1	Friendly		Frazer; N. Nuñez; Symms
13 June 2004	Canada (A)	Canada	0–4	2006 FIFA World Cup qualification	8,245	
16 June 2004	Canada (A)	Canada	0–4	2006 FIFA World Cup qualification	5,124	
19 February 2005	Guatemala (A)	Guatemala	0–2	2005 UNCAF Nations Cup		
21 February 2005	Guatemala (N)	Honduras	0–4	2005 UNCAF Nations Cup		
23 February 2005	Guatemala (N)	Nicaragua	0–1	2005 UNCAF Nations Cup		
8 February 2007	El Salvador (A)	El Salvador	1–2	2007 UNCAF Nations Cup		Benavides 64'
10 February 2007	El Salvador (N)	Guatemala	0–1	2007 UNCAF Nations Cup		
12 February 2007	El Salvador (N)	Nicaragua	2–4	2007 UNCAF Nations Cup		D. McCaulay 25', 34'
22 January 2008	Belize (H)	El Salvador	0–1	Friendly		
6 February 2008	Guatemala (N)	Saint Kitts and Nevis	3–1	2010 FIFA World Cup qualification	500	D. McCaulay 7', 41'; Roches 23'
26 March 2008	St. Kitts (A)	Saint Kitts and Nevis	1–1	2010 FIFA World Cup qualification	2,000	Smith 39'
23 May 2008	Honduras (A)	Honduras	0–2	Friendly		
15 June 2008	United States (N)	Mexico	0–2	2010 FIFA World Cup qualification	50,137	
21 June 2008	Mexico (A)	Mexico	0–7	2010 FIFA World Cup qualification	42,000	
22 January 2009	Honduras (A)	Honduras	1–2	2009 UNCAF Nations Cup	20,000	Castillo 86'
24 January 2009	Honduras (N)	El Salvador	1–4	2009 UNCAF Nations Cup	900	James 73'
26 January 2009	Honduras (N)	Nicaragua	1–1	2009 UNCAF Nations Cup	8,000	Usher 27'
10 September 2010	Belize (H)	Trinidad and Tobago	0–0	Friendly		
9 October 2010	Guatemala (A)	Guatemala	2–4	Friendly		Roches 43'; Kuylen 55'
14 January 2011	Panama (A)	Panama	0–2	2011 Copa Centroamericana	10,000	
16 January 2011	Panama (N)	El Salvador	2–5	2011 Copa Centroamericana	1,500	Smith 45+1' (pen.); O.Jiménez 76'
18 January 2011	Panama (N)	Nicaragua	1–1	2011 Copa Centroamericana	20,000	D. Jiménez 81'
15 June 2011	Trinidad and Tobago (N)	Montserrat	5–2	2014 FIFA World Cup qualification	100	D. McCaulay 24', 74', 83'; Roches 50'; Kuylen 53'
17 July 2011	Honduras (N)	Montserrat	3–1	2014 FIFA World Cup qualification	150	Jimenez 24'; D. McCaulay 61'; Mendez 63'
2 September 2011	Grenada (A)	Grenada	3–0	2014 FIFA World Cup qualification	2,600	D. McCaulay 11', 79'; Róches 35'
6 September 2011	Belize (H)	Guatemala	1–2	2014 FIFA World Cup qualification	3,027	D. McCaulay 77'
7 October 2011	Belize (H)	Grenada	1–4	2014 FIFA World Cup qualification	1,200	Simpson 90'
11 October 2011	Guatemala (A)	Guatemala	1–3	2014 FIFA World Cup qualification	21,107	D. McCaulay 31'
11 November 2011	Belize (H)	Saint Vincent and the Grenadines	1–1	2014 FIFA World Cup qualification	300	D. McCaulay 16'
15 November 2011	St. Vincent and the Grenadines (A)	Saint Vincent and the Grenadines	2–0	2014 FIFA World Cup qualification	500	D. McCaulay 75', 78' (pen.)
18 January 2013	Costa Rica (A)	Costa Rica	0–1	2013 Copa Centroamericana (group stage - A)	5,484	
20 January 2013	Costa Rica (N)	Guatemala	0–0	2013 Copa Centroamericana (group stage - A)	250	
22 January 2013	Costa Rica (N)	Nicaragua	2–1	2013 Copa Centroamericana (group stage - A)	750	Lennen 29'; D. McCaulay 90+2'
25 January 2013	Costa Rica (N)	Honduras	0–1	2013 Copa Centroamericana (semifinal)	1,644	
27 January 2013	Costa Rica (N)	El Salvador	0–1	2013 Copa Centroamericana (third Place Match)	1,997	
23 March 2013	Belize (H)	Trinidad and Tobago	0–0	Friendly		
11 June 2013	Guatemala (A)	Guatemala	0–0	Friendly		
9 July 2013	United States (A)	United States	1–6	2013 CONCACAF Gold Cup (group stage)	18,724	Gaynair 40'
13 July 2013	United States (N)	Costa Rica	0–1	2013 CONCACAF Gold Cup (group stage)	17,597	
16 July 2013	United States (N)	Cuba	0–4	2013 CONCACAF Gold Cup (group stage)	25,432	
3 September 2014	United States (N)	Honduras	0–2	2014 Copa Centroamericana	20,516	
7 September 2014	United States (N)	Guatemala	1–2	2014 Copa Centroamericana	20,156	D. McCaulay 80'
10 September 2014	United States (N)	El Salvador	0–2	2014 Copa Centroamericana	19,287	
25 March 2015	Belize (H)	Cayman Islands	0–0	2018 FIFA World Cup qualification		
29 March 2015	Cayman Islands (A)	Cayman Islands	1–1	2018 FIFA World Cup qualification		Kuylen 20'
11 June 2015	Dominican Republic (A)	Dominican Republic	2–1	2018 FIFA World Cup qualification		D. McCaulay 13', 88'
15 June 2015	Belize (H)	Dominican Republic	3–0	2018 FIFA World Cup qualification		Róchez 17'; Kuylen 37'; D. McCaulay 76'
4 September 2015	Canadá (A)	Canada	0–3	2018 FIFA World Cup qualification		
8 September 2015	Belize (H)	Canada	1–1	FIFA World Cup qualification		D. McCaulay 26'
8 October 2016	Belize (H)	Honduras	1–2	Friendly		Kuylen 32'
11 November 2016	Honduras (A)	Honduras	0–5	Friendly		
13 January 2017	Panama (N)	Panama	0–0	2017 Copa Centroamericana		
15 January 2017	Panama (N)	Costa Rica	0–3	2017 Copa Centroamericana		
17 January 2017	Panama (N)	El Salvador	1–3	2017 Copa Centroamericana		D. McCaulay 43'
20 January 2017	Panama (N)	Nicaragua	1–3	2017 Copa Centroamericana		Smith 54' (pen.)
22 January 2017	Panama (N)	Honduras	0–1	2017 Copa Centroamericana		
22 March 2018	Belize (H)	Grenada	4–2	Friendly		Salazar 11'; Davis 24'; Smith 40', 74' (pen.)
3 June 2018	Barbados (A)	Barbados	0–0	Friendly		
4 August 2018	Belize (H)	Barbados	1–0	Friendly		K. Lopez 79'
7 September 2018	Belize (H)	Bahamas	4–0	2019–20 CONCACAF Nations League qualifying		D. McCaulay 40'; J.Miller (A.G), 44'; K. Lopez 80', 90+5'
14 October 2018	Montserrat (A)	Montserrat	0–1	2019–20 CONCACAF Nations League qualifying		
16 November 2018	Belize (H)	Puerto Rico	1–0	2019–20 CONCACAF Nations League qualifying		D. Casey Jr. 31'
23 March 2019	Guyana (A)	Guyana	1–2	2019–20 CONCACAF Nations League qualifying		Elroy Kuylen 25'
30 August 2019	Belize (H)	Saint Vincent and the Grenadines	1–1	Friendly		Highking Roberts
1 September 2019	Belize (H)	Saint Vincent and the Grenadines	1–0	Friendly		D. McCaulay
5 September 2019	French Guiana (A)	French Guiana	0–3	2019–20 CONCACAF Nations League		
8 September 2019	Belize (H)	Grenada	1–2	2019–20 CONCACAF Nations League		
10 October 2019	Belize (H)	Saint Kitts and Nevis	0–4	2019–20 CONCACAF Nations League		
13 November 2019	Belize (H)	French Guiana	2–0	2019–20 CONCACAF Nations League		Lewis 4'; D. McCaulay 70'
17 November 2019	Grenada (A)	Grenada	2–3	2019–20 CONCACAF Nations League		Gaynair 32'; Salazar 55'
25 March 2021	Haiti (A)	Haiti	0–2	2022 FIFA World Cup qualification		
30 March 2021	Dominican Republic (N)	Turks and Caicos Islands	5–0	2022 FIFA World Cup qualification		Bernárdez 45+3', 48'; August 47'; Nembhard 81'; D. McCaulay 90+1'
4 June 2021	Nicaragua (A)	Nicaragua	0–3	2022 FIFA World Cup qualification		
29 January 2022	Nicaragua (A)	Nicaragua	0–4	Friendly		
1 February 2022	Nicaragua (A)	Nicaragua	1–1	Friendly		McCaulay 76'
27 March 2022	Belize (H)	Cuba	0–3	Friendly		
2 June 2022	Belize (H)	Dominican Republic	0–2	2022–23 CONCACAF Nations League		
5 June 2022	Guatemala (A)	Guatemala	0–2	2022–23 CONCACAF Nations League		
9 June 2022	Belize (H)	French Guiana	1–1	2022–23 CONCACAF Nations League		Avila 74'
14 June 2022	French Guiana (A)	French Guiana	0–1	2022–23 CONCACAF Nations League		
24 March 2023	Belize (H)	Guatemala	1–2	2022–23 CONCACAF Nations League		Leonel 45+1'
27 March 2023	Belize (A)	Dominican Republic	0–2	2022–23 CONCACAF Nations League		
8 September 2023	Martinique (N)	Saint Vincent and the Grenadines	1-2	2023–24 CONCACAF Nations League		Mensah 18'
12 September 2023	French Guiana (A)	French Guiana	0-2	2023–24 CONCACAF Nations League		Polanco 64' Cappello 68'
13 October 2023	Belize (H)	Bermuda	0-1	2023–24 CONCACAF Nations League		
17 October 2023	Bermuda (A)	Bermuda	1-1	2023–24 CONCACAF Nations League		Reneau 75' (pen.)
17 November 2023	Belize (H)	French Guiana	1-0	2023–24 CONCACAF Nations League		Martinez 90+6'
21 November 2023	Saint Vincent and the Grenadines (A)	Saint Vincent and the Grenadines	3-0	2023–24 CONCACAF Nations League		
22 March 2024	Belize (H)	Puerto Rico	1-1	Friendly		Bernárdez 6'
8 June 2024	Belize (H)	Nicaragua	0-4	2026 FIFA World Cup qualification		
11 June 2024	Barbados (A)	Guyana	3-1	2026 FIFA World Cup qualification	110	Bernárdez 89'
7 September 2024	Turks and Caicos Islands (A)	Turks and Caicos Islands	0-4	2024–25 CONCACAF Nations League	271	Velasquez 12' Polanco 43', 73' Palacio 66'
10 September 2024	Belize (H)	Anguilla	1-0	2024–25 CONCACAF Nations League		Polanco 27'
9 October 2024	Anguilla (A)	Anguilla	0-1	2024–25 CONCACAF Nations League		Velasquez 56'
15 October 2024	Belize (H)	Turks and Caicos Islands	0-3	2024–25 CONCACAF Nations League		Polanco 28' Hernández 40' Lopez 57'
15 November 2024	Belize (H)	French Guiana	2-1	2024–25 CONCACAF Nations League	370	Bernárdez 67' (pen.) Martínez 75'
19 November 2024	French Guiana (A)	French Guiana	2-2	2024–25 CONCACAF Nations League		Lopez 40' Bernárdez 52'
21 March 2025	Belize (H)	Costa Rica	0-7	2025 CONCACAF Gold Cup		
25 March 2025	Costa Rica (A)	Costa Rica	1-6	2025 CONCACAF Gold Cup		Bernárdez 47'
21 June 2025	Trinidad and Tobago (N)	Montserrat	0-1	2026 FIFA World Cup qualification		
21 June 2025	Belize (H)	Panama	0-2	2026 FIFA World Cup qualification		
15 November 2025	Saint Kitts and Nevis (N)	Saint Martin	1-0	2025-26 CONCACAF Series		Wade 26'
21 November 2025	Saint Kitts and Nevis (A)	Saint Kitts and Nevis	6-2	2025-26 CONCACAF Series		Wade 9', 28', 43' Meza Jr. 80', 82' Martinez 90+3'

== Record by opponent ==
Updated on 18 November 2025 after match against Saint Kitts and Nevis

Positive Record Neutral Record Negative Record

Opponent	P	W	D	L	GF	GA	GF
Anguilla	2	2	0	0	2	0	+2
Bahamas	1	1	0	0	4	0	+4
Barbados	2	1	1	0	1	0	+1
Bermuda	2	0	1	1	1	2	–1
Canada	5	0	1	4	1	14	−13
Cayman Islands	2	0	2	0	1	1	0
Costa Rica	8	0	0	8	2	31	−29
Cuba	3	1	0	2	3	9	−6
Dominican Republic	4	2	0	2	5	5	0
El Salvador	10	0	0	10	6	29	−23
French Guiana	7	4	2	1	10	5	+5
Grenada	5	2	0	3	11	11	0
Guatemala	13	0	4	9	10	23	−13
Guyana	3	1	0	2	5	6	–1
Haiti	1	0	0	1	0	2	–2
Honduras	10	1	0	9	4	24	−20
Jamaica	1	0	1	0	2	2	0
Mexico	2	0	0	2	0	9	−9
Montserrat	4	2	0	2	8	5	+3
Nicaragua	13	4	3	6	19	25	–6
Panama	7	0	2	5	3	12	−9
Puerto Rico	3	2	1	0	5	1	+4
Saint Kitts and Nevis	5	3	1	1	11	8	+3
Saint Martin	1	1	0	0	1	0	+1
Saint Vincent and the Grenadines	6	2	2	2	6	7	–1
Turks and Caicos Islands	3	3	0	0	12	0	+12
Trinidad and Tobago	2	0	2	0	0	0	0
United States	1	0	0	1	1	6	−5
Total	125	33	22	70	134	237	−103
