= Omari Bain =

Bahamian footballer (born 2002)

Personal information
- Full name: Omari Andrew Alfred Bain
- Date of birth: 13 November 2002 (age 23)
- Place of birth: Bahamas
- Height: 1.85 m (6 ft 1 in)
- Position: Forward

Team information
- Current team: Fundación Rayo Vallecano
- Number: 9

Youth career
- 2020–2021: B1 Soccer Academy

Senior career*
Years	Team	Apps	(Gls)
2021–2022	Santa Perpètua	7	(0)
2022–2023	Can Buxeres	17	(6)
2023–	Fundación Rayo Vallecano	10	(16)

International career
2022–	Bahamas	6	(2)
- * Club domestic league appearances and goals

Omari Bain (born 13 November 2002) is a Bahamian footballer who plays as a forward for Fundación Rayo Vallecano U-23 of the Tercera de Aficionados Madrid, and the Bahamas national team.

== Career ==
In 2021, Bain joined Spanish side B1 Soccer Academy. Later that summer he moved to UCF Santa Perpètua. He made his debut for that club in the first match of the season, starting the match against UE Costa Brava on 28 August. By late 2022 Bain had moved to FC Can Buxeres of the Tercera Catalana.

== International career ==
Bain made his senior international debut on 14 May 2022 in a friendly against Turks and Caicos.

=== International goals ===
Scores and results list Bahamas goal tally first.

No.	Date	Venue	Opponent	Score	Result	Competition
1	4 March 2023	Roscow A. L. Davies Soccer Field, Nassau, Bahamas	Turks and Caicos Islands	2–0	2–0	Friendly
2	12 October 2024	Wildey Turf, Wildey, Barbados	U.S. Virgin Islands	3–1	3–1	2024–25 CONCACAF Nations League C
Last updated 15 October 2024

=== International career statistics ===
As of match played 12 October 2024.

Bahamas
Year	Apps	Goals
2022	3	0
2023	2	1
2024	1	1
Total	6	2
