= 2024–25 CONCACAF Nations League Play-in =

International football competition

The 2024–25 CONCACAF Nations League Play-in was the post group stage round of Leagues A and C of the 2024–25 edition of the CONCACAF Nations League, the fourth season of the international football competition involving the men's national teams of the 41 member associations of CONCACAF. It was held from 14 to 19 November 2024.

The play-in round served as a qualifier for the Gold Cup prelims, the pre-Gold Cup competition that determined the final teams to qualify for the 2025 CONCACAF Gold Cup.

== Format ==
The play-in round was contested by the two bottom teams from each group of League A (teams ranked 5th and 6th) and the top four teams from League C (three group winners and the best team among the group runners-up). These eight teams were divided into four ties.

Each tie was played on a home-and-away two-legged basis, with the teams from League A hosting the second legs. If the aggregate score was level at the end of the second leg, the away goals rule was applied. If away goals were also equal, then 30 minutes of extra time were played without taking into account the away goals rule during this time. If still tied after extra time, the tie was decided by a penalty shoot-out.

Winners qualified for the 2025 CONCACAF Gold Cup qualification tournament.

== Seeding ==
Teams were seeded based on their results during the group stage of their respective league, in order to determine the pairings.

League A 5th and 6th placed teams
Rank	Grp	Team	Pld	W	D	L	GF	GA	GD	Pts
1	A	Guadeloupe	4	1	1	2	1	4	−3	4
2	B	Cuba	4	0	3	1	4	6	−2	3
3	B	French Guiana	4	0	1	3	4	7	−3	1
4	A	Guyana	4	0	1	3	5	13	−8	1

Source: CONCACAF
Rules for classification: Tiebreakers

League C group winners and best runner-up
Rank	Grp	Team	Pld	W	D	L	GF	GA	GD	Pts
1	A	Barbados	4	4	0	0	17	4	+13	12
2	B	Belize	4	4	0	0	9	0	+9	12
3	C	Saint Kitts and Nevis	4	3	1	0	10	3	+7	10
4	C	Cayman Islands	4	2	1	1	4	5	−1	7

Source: CONCACAF
Rules for classification: Tiebreakers

The match-ups were as follows:

- Play-in 1 (PI1): League A best 5th placed team vs League C best group runner-up
- Play-in 2 (PI2): League A worst 5th placed team vs League C third-best group winner
- Play-in 3 (PI3): League A best 6th placed team vs League C second-best group winner
- Play-in 4 (PI4): League A worst 6th placed team vs League C best group winner

== Summary ==
The first legs were played on 14 and 15 November, and the second legs were played on 18 and 19 November 2024.

Team 1	Agg.	Team 2	1st leg	2nd leg
Cayman Islands	0–7	Guadeloupe	0–6	0–1
Saint Kitts and Nevis	2–5	Cuba	2–1	0–4
Belize	4–3	French Guiana	2–1	2–2
Barbados	4–9	Guyana	1–4	3–5

== Matches ==
The fixture list was confirmed by CONCACAF on 23 May 2024, with the matchups being confirmed on 16 October 2024. All match times are in EST (UTC−5) as listed by CONCACAF (local times, if different, are in parentheses).

15 November 2024
15:00

Cayman Islands	0–6	Guadeloupe
	Report	Mirval 12'; Leborgne 37'; Plumain 41'; Tille 64'; Mixtur 71'; Owens 90' (o.g.)

Truman Bodden Sports Complex, George Town
Attendance: 194
Referee: Adonai Escobedo (Mexico)
19 November 2024
17:00 (18:00 UTC−4)

Guadeloupe	1–0	Cayman Islands
Tille 88'	Report

Stade Roger Zami, Le Gosier
Referee: Ismael Cornejo (El Salvador)

Guadeloupe won 7–0 on aggregate and qualified for the 2025 CONCACAF Gold Cup qualification.

14 November 2024
18:00 (19:00 UTC−4)

Saint Kitts and Nevis	2–1	Cuba
Sawyers 8'; Burley 48'	Report	Paradela 40'

SKNFA Technical Center, Basseterre
Attendance: 459
Referee: Tori Penso (United States)
18 November 2024
15:00

Cuba	4–0	Saint Kitts and Nevis
Hernández 40'; Piedra 45+3'; Paradela 50'; Reyes 87' (pen.)	Report

Estadio Antonio Maceo, Santiago de Cuba
Attendance: 3,500
Referee: Iván Barton (El Salvador)

Cuba won 5–2 on aggregate and qualified for the 2025 CONCACAF Gold Cup qualification.

14 November 2024
20:00 (19:00 UTC−6)

Belize	2–1	French Guiana
Bernárdez 67' (pen.); Martínez 75'	Report	Torvic 90+3'

FFB Stadium, Belmopan
Attendance: 370
Referee: Keylor Herrera (Costa Rica)
19 November 2024
18:00 (20:00 UTC−3)

French Guiana	2–2	Belize
Nozile 48'; Haabo 89' (pen.)	Report	Lopez 40'; Bernárdez 52'

Dr. Ir. Franklin Essed Stadion, Paramaribo, Suriname
Referee: Marco Ortíz (Mexico)

Belize won 4–3 on aggregate and qualified for the 2025 CONCACAF Gold Cup qualification.

15 November 2024
18:00 (19:00 UTC−4)

Barbados	1–4	Guyana
Reid-Stephen 17'	Report	Glasgow 26', 59'; De Rosario 60'; George 90+2'

Wildey Turf, Bridgetown
Attendance: 928
Referee: Odette Hamilton (Jamaica)
19 November 2024
19:00 (20:00 UTC−4)

Guyana	5–3	Barbados
De Rosario 27', 41', 45+2'; Glasgow 57'; Jones 90+4'	Report	Gale 49', 67'; Reid-Stephen 63'

Synthetic Track and Field Facility, Leonora
Referee: Selvin Brown (Honduras)

Guyana won 9–4 on aggregate and qualified for the 2025 CONCACAF Gold Cup qualification.

== Goalscorers ==
There were 34 goals scored in 8 matches, for an average of 4.25 goals per match.

4 goals

- (Guyana) Osaze De Rosario

3 goals

- (Guyana) Omari Glasgow

2 goals

- (Barbados) Thierry Gale
- (Barbados) Niall Reid-Stephen
- (Belize) Carlos Bernárdez
- (Cuba) Luis Paradela
- (Guadeloupe) Vikash Tille

1 goal

- (Belize) Krisean Lopez
- (Belize) Eugene Martínez
- (Cuba) Onel Hernández
- (Cuba) Yosel Piedra
- (Cuba) Maikel Reyes
- (French Guiana) Jules Haabo
- (French Guiana) Yvelin Nozile
- (French Guiana) Thomas Torvic
- (Guadeloupe) Jordan Leborgne
- (Guadeloupe) Raphaël Mirval
- (Guadeloupe) Kenny Mixtur
- (Guadeloupe) Ange-Freddy Plumain
- (Guyana) Enoch George
- (Saint Kitts and Nevis) Andre Burley
- (Saint Kitts and Nevis) Romaine Sawyers

1 own goal

- (Barbados) Nicoli Brathwaite (against Guyana)
- (Cayman Islands) Dominic Owens (against Guadeloupe)
