= 2024–25 CONCACAF Nations League =

Tournament details
- Dates: Leagues A and C: 4 September – 15 October 2024; League B: 5 September – 19 November 2024; League A quarter-finals and play-in: 14–19 November 2024; Nations League Finals: 20–23 March 2025
- Teams: 41

Final positions
- Champions: Mexico (1st title)
- Runners-up: Panama
- Third place: Canada
- Fourth place: United States

Tournament statistics
- Matches played: 110
- Goals scored: 357 (3.25 per match)
- Top scorer(s): (Dominican Republic) Dorny Romero (10 goals)
- Best player: (Mexico) Raúl Jiménez
- Best young player: (El Salvador) Nathan Ordaz
- Best goalkeeper: (Mexico) Luis Malagón
- Fair play award: Panama

The 2024–25 CONCACAF Nations League was the fourth season of the CONCACAF Nations League, an international association football competition involving the men's national teams of the 41 member associations of CONCACAF. The competition began with the group stage in September 2024, and concluded with the Nations League Finals in March 2025. The Nations League also served as qualification for the 2025 CONCACAF Gold Cup.

The three-time defending champions United States were eliminated by Panama in the semi-finals. Mexico won their first title after defeating Panama in the final.

== Format ==
The CONCACAF Nations League continued to be played in the format introduced for the 2023–24 season.

League A featured sixteen teams. The four best-ranked teams according to the CONCACAF Ranking Index received a bye to the quarter-finals. The remaining twelve teams entered the group stage using a Swiss-system tournament format. The teams were divided into two groups of six teams, with each team playing four matches against group opponents (two at home and two away). The top two teams from both groups advanced to the quarter-finals and were joined by the four teams which received a bye. The teams advancing from the group stage were drawn into ties against teams that received a bye, which were played on a two-legged home-and-away basis. The four quarter-final winners advanced to the Nations League Finals, which were played in a knockout format, consisting of the semi-finals, third place play-off, and final match to determine the champions.

League B featured sixteen teams divided into four groups of four. Each team played six matches in a double round-robin format. Unlike previous editions, matches were not played in standard home-and-away format. Instead, for each FIFA Match Window, matches in each group were played at a centralized venue. The third-best-ranked teams in each group hosted all four September matches (matchday 1 and 2), the second-best-ranked teams hosted all four October matches (matchday 3 and 4), and the best-ranked teams hosted all four November matches (matchday 5 and 6). If a team was unable to host matches, CONCACAF reserved the right to select a venue.

League C featured nine teams. Teams were divided into three groups of three teams, with each team playing four matches in a double round-robin format. Similar to League B, matches in each group were played at a centralized venue. The second-highest-ranked teams in each group hosted the September matches (matchday 1, 2 and 3), and the highest-ranked teams hosted the October matches (matchday 4, 5 and 6). League C was not played at the November window.

Promotion and relegation continued for the 2024–25 season, with the fifth and sixth-placed teams in League A and the fourth-placed teams in League B relegated for the next season. The group winners of Leagues B and C were promoted, as were the best second-placed team of League C.

=== Tiebreakers ===
The ranking of teams in each group was determined as follows (Regulations Article 12.6):

1. Points obtained in all group matches (three points for a win, one for a draw, zero for a loss);
2. Goal difference in all group matches;
3. Number of goals scored in all group matches;

If two or more teams were still tied based on the above criteria, their rankings were determined as follows:

1. Points obtained in the matches played between the teams in question;
2. Goal difference in the matches played between the teams in question;
3. Number of goals scored in the matches played between the teams in question;
4. Number of away goals scored in the matches played between the teams in question (if the tie was only between two teams);
5. Lowest number of disciplinary points in all group matches (only one deduction could be applied to a player in a single match):
  - Yellow card: 1 points;
  - Indirect red card (second yellow card): 3 points;
  - Direct red card: 4 points;
  - Yellow card and direct red card: 5 points;
6. Drawing of lots.

== Entrants ==
All of CONCACAF's 41 member associations entered the competition. Teams were divided into leagues based on their results from the 2023–24 season. Fifth- and sixth-placed teams in League A and the fourth-placed teams in League B from the 2023–24 season moved down a league, while the teams that finished top of each group in Leagues B and C moved up, as did the best second-placed team of League C. The remaining teams stayed in their respective leagues.

League A
| Pot | Team | Prv | Pts | Rank |
|---|---|---|---|---|
| QF | Mexico | Same position | 1,907 | 1 |
| QF | United States | Same position | 1,849 | 2 |
| QF | Panama | Same position | 1,737 | 3 |
| QF | Canada | Same position | 1,710 | 4 |
| 1 | Jamaica | Same position | 1,677 | 5 |
| 1 | Costa Rica | Same position | 1,621 | 6 |
| 2 | Honduras | Same position | 1,431 | 7 |
| 2 | Guatemala | Same position | 1,395 | 9 |
| 3 | Trinidad and Tobago | Same position | 1,344 | 10 |
| 3 | Martinique | Same position | 1,322 | 11 |
| 4 | Cuba | Same position | 1,158 | 13 |
| 4 | Guadeloupe | ▲ | 1,119 | 15 |
| 5 | Nicaragua | ▲ | 1,112 | 16 |
| 5 | Suriname | Same position | 1,070 | 17 |
| 6 | French Guiana | ▲ | 1,058 | 18 |
| 6 | Guyana | ▲ | 1,054 | 19 |

League B
| Pot | Team | Prv | Pts | Rank |
|---|---|---|---|---|
| 1 | Haiti | ▼ | 1,409 | 8 |
| 1 | El Salvador | ▼ | 1,230 | 12 |
| 1 | Curaçao | ▼ | 1,134 | 14 |
| 1 | Dominican Republic | Same position | 933 | 20 |
| 2 | Bermuda | Same position | 854 | 21 |
| 2 | Puerto Rico | Same position | 849 | 22 |
| 2 | Montserrat | Same position | 815 | 23 |
| 2 | Saint Lucia | Same position | 798 | 24 |
| 3 | Grenada | ▼ | 774 | 26 |
| 3 | Saint Vincent and the Grenadines | Same position | 769 | 27 |
| 3 | Antigua and Barbuda | Same position | 768 | 28 |
| 3 | Aruba | ▲ | 641 | 30 |
| 4 | Dominica | ▲ | 638 | 31 |
| 4 | Bonaire | ▲ | 590 | 32 |
| 4 | Saint Martin | ▲ | 522 | 34 |
| 4 | Sint Maarten | Same position | 487 | 35 |

League C
| Pot | Team | Prv | Pts | Rank |
|---|---|---|---|---|
| 1 | Saint Kitts and Nevis | ▼ | 779 | 25 |
| 1 | Belize | ▼ | 737 | 29 |
| 1 | Barbados | ▼ | 558 | 33 |
| 2 | Bahamas | ▼ | 479 | 36 |
| 2 | Cayman Islands | Same position | 393 | 37 |
| 2 | Turks and Caicos Islands | Same position | 324 | 38 |
| 3 | British Virgin Islands | Same position | 207 | 39 |
| 3 | U.S. Virgin Islands | Same position | 155 | 40 |
| 3 | Anguilla | Same position | 150 | 41 |

== Schedule ==
Below was the schedule for the 2024–25 CONCACAF Nations League. On 6 May 2024, CONCACAF held the draw for the group stage of all three Nations League groups.

| Round | | | Date, or corresponding FIFA window |
| League A | League B | League C | Date, or corresponding FIFA window |
|---|---|---|---|
| Matchday 1 | | Matchday 1 | 4–10 September 2024 |
| Matchday 2 | | Matchday 2 | 4–10 September 2024 |
| —N/a | | Matchday 3 | 4–10 September 2024 |
| Matchday 3 | | Matchday 4 | 9–15 October 2024 |
| Matchday 4 | | Matchday 5 | 9–15 October 2024 |
| —N/a | | Matchday 6 | 9–15 October 2024 |
| Quarter-finals and play-in, 1st leg | Matchday 5 | Play-in, 1st leg | 14–19 November 2024 |
| Quarter-finals and play-in, 2nd leg | Matchday 6 | Play-in, 2nd leg | 14–19 November 2024 |
| Semi-finals | —N/a | —N/a | 20 March 2025 |
| Third place play-off | —N/a | —N/a | 23 March 2025 |
| Final | —N/a | —N/a | 23 March 2025 |

== League A ==
=== Group A ===
| Pos | Team | Pld | W | D | L | GF | GA | GD | Pts | Qualification or relegation | (Costa Rica) | (Suriname) | (Guatemala) | (Martinique) | (Guadeloupe) | (Guyana) |
|---|---|---|---|---|---|---|---|---|---|---|---|---|---|---|---|---|
| 1 | Costa Rica | 4 | 2 | 2 | 0 | 7 | 1 | +6 | 8 | Advance to quarter-finals | — | — | 3–0 | — | 3–0 | — |
| 2 | Suriname | 4 | 2 | 1 | 1 | 9 | 4 | +5 | 7 | Advance to quarter-finals | 1–1 | — | — | — | — | 5–1 |
| 3 | Guatemala | 4 | 2 | 1 | 1 | 6 | 5 | +1 | 7 | Qualification for Gold Cup prelims | 0–0 | — | — | 3–1 | — | — |
| 4 | Martinique | 4 | 1 | 2 | 1 | 4 | 5 | −1 | 5 | Qualification for Gold Cup prelims | — | — | — | — | 0–0 | 2–2 |
| 5 | Guadeloupe (R) | 4 | 1 | 1 | 2 | 1 | 4 | −3 | 4 | Advance to play-in and relegation to League B | — | 1–0 | — | 0–1 | — | — |
| 6 | Guyana (R) | 4 | 0 | 1 | 3 | 5 | 13 | −8 | 1 | Advance to play-in and relegation to League B | — | 1–3 | 1–3 | — | — | — |

Source: CONCACAF
Rules for classification: Tiebreakers
(R) Relegated

=== Group B ===
| Pos | Team | Pld | W | D | L | GF | GA | GD | Pts | Qualification or relegation | (Jamaica) | (Honduras) | (Nicaragua) | (Trinidad and Tobago) | (Cuba) | (French Guiana) |
|---|---|---|---|---|---|---|---|---|---|---|---|---|---|---|---|---|
| 1 | Jamaica | 4 | 2 | 2 | 0 | 4 | 1 | +3 | 8 | Advance to quarter-finals | — | 0–0 | — | — | 0–0 | — |
| 2 | Honduras | 4 | 2 | 1 | 1 | 8 | 4 | +4 | 7 | Advance to quarter-finals | 1–2 | — | — | 4–0 | — | — |
| 3 | Nicaragua | 4 | 2 | 1 | 1 | 5 | 5 | 0 | 7 | Qualification for Gold Cup prelims | 0–2 | — | — | — | — | 3–2 |
| 4 | Trinidad and Tobago | 4 | 1 | 2 | 1 | 5 | 7 | −2 | 5 | Qualification for Gold Cup prelims | — | — | — | — | 3–1 | 0–0 |
| 5 | Cuba (R) | 4 | 0 | 3 | 1 | 4 | 6 | −2 | 3 | Advance to play-in and relegation to League B | — | — | 1–1 | 2–2 | — | — |
| 6 | French Guiana (R) | 4 | 0 | 1 | 3 | 4 | 7 | −3 | 1 | Advance to play-in and relegation to League B | — | 2–3 | 0–1 | — | — | — |

Source: CONCACAF
Rules for classification: Tiebreakers
(R) Relegated

=== Quarter-finals ===
The quarter-finals pairings were determined based on the CONCACAF Rankings published after the October 2024 FIFA Match Window for the four pre-seeded teams and the group stage results for the winners and runners-up of each group.

Seeded teams
| Pos | Team | Rank (Note: CONCACAF rankings (as of 16 October 2024)) | Pts |
|---|---|---|---|
| 1 | Mexico | 1 | 1,900 |
| 2 | Canada | 2 | 1,807 |
| 3 | United States | 3 | 1,776 |
| 4 | Panama | 4 | 1,730 |

Group stage winners and runners-up
| Rank | Grp | Team | Pld | W | D | L | GF | GA | GD | Pts |
|---|---|---|---|---|---|---|---|---|---|---|
| 1 | A | Costa Rica | 4 | 2 | 2 | 0 | 7 | 1 | +6 | 8 |
| 2 | B | Jamaica | 4 | 2 | 2 | 0 | 4 | 1 | +3 | 8 |
| 3 | A | Suriname | 4 | 2 | 1 | 1 | 9 | 4 | +5 | 7 |
| 4 | B | Honduras | 4 | 2 | 1 | 1 | 8 | 4 | +4 | 7 |

Source: CONCACAF
Rules for classification: Tiebreakers

The match-ups were as follows:

- Quarter-final 1 (QF1): Fourth-ranked pre-seeded team vs Best ranked group winner
- Quarter-final 2 (QF2): Third-ranked pre-seeded team vs Worst ranked group winner
- Quarter-final 3 (QF3): Second-ranked pre-seeded team vs Best ranked group runner-up
- Quarter-final 4 (QF4): First-ranked pre-seeded team vs Worst ranked group runner-up

The first legs were played on 14 and 15 November, and the second legs were played on 18 and 19 November 2024.

| Team 1 | Agg. | Team 2 | 1st leg | 2nd leg |
|---|---|---|---|---|
| Costa Rica | 2–3 | Panama | 0–1 | 2–2 |
| Jamaica | 2–5 | United States | 0–1 | 2–4 |
| Suriname | 0–4 | Canada | 0–1 | 0–3 |
| Honduras | 2–4 | Mexico | 2–0 | 0–4 |

=== Nations League Finals ===
==== Seeding ====
The four teams were ranked based on their results in the two quarter-finals legs to determine the semi-final matchups. The first seed played the fourth seed and the second seed played the third seed.

| Seed | QF | Team | Pld | W | D | L | GF | GA | GD | Pts |
|---|---|---|---|---|---|---|---|---|---|---|
| 1 | QF3 | Canada | 2 | 2 | 0 | 0 | 4 | 0 | +4 | 6 |
| 2 | QF2 | United States | 2 | 2 | 0 | 0 | 5 | 2 | +3 | 6 |
| 3 | QF1 | Panama | 2 | 1 | 1 | 0 | 3 | 2 | +1 | 4 |
| 4 | QF4 | Mexico | 2 | 1 | 0 | 1 | 4 | 2 | +2 | 3 |

Source: CONCACAF
Rules for classification: Tiebreakers

==== Bracket ====
Semi-finals
20 March – Inglewood
Canada | 0
Mexico | 2
20 March – Inglewood
United States | 0
Panama | 1

Final
23 March – Inglewood
Mexico | 2
Panama | 1
Third place play-off
23 March – Inglewood
Canada | 2
United States | 1

==== Semi-finals ====
20 March 2025
19:00 (16:00 UTC−7)

| United States | 0–1 | Panama |
|---|---|---|
| | Report | Waterman 90+4' |

SoFi Stadium, Inglewood
Referee: Oshane Nation (Jamaica)

20 March 2025
22:30 (19:30 UTC−7)

| Canada | 0–2 | Mexico |
|---|---|---|
| | Report | Jiménez 1', 75' |

SoFi Stadium, Inglewood
Attendance: 50,295
Referee: Saíd Martínez (Honduras)

==== Third place play-off ====
23 March 2025
18:00 (15:00 UTC−7)

| Canada | 2–1 | United States |
|---|---|---|
| Oluwaseyi 27'; J. David 59' | Report | Agyemang 35' |

SoFi Stadium, Inglewood
Referee: Katia García (Mexico)

==== Final ====
23 March 2025
21:30 (18:30 UTC−7)

| Mexico | 2–1 | Panama |
|---|---|---|
| Jiménez 8', 90+2' (pen.) | Report | Carrasquilla 45+2' (pen.) |

SoFi Stadium, Inglewood
Attendance: 68,212
Referee: Mario Escobar (Guatemala)

== League B ==
=== Group A ===
| Pos | Team | Pld | W | D | L | GF | GA | GD | Pts | Promotion, qualification or relegation | (El Salvador) | (Saint Vincent and the Grenadines) | (Bonaire) | (Montserrat) |
|---|---|---|---|---|---|---|---|---|---|---|---|---|---|---|
| 1 | El Salvador (H, P) | 6 | 5 | 0 | 1 | 12 | 6 | +6 | 15 | Promotion to League A and qualification for Gold Cup | — | 1–2 | 2–1 | 1–0 |
| 2 | Saint Vincent and the Grenadines (H) | 6 | 4 | 1 | 1 | 12 | 7 | +5 | 13 | Qualification for Gold Cup prelims | 2–3 | — | 3–1 | 2–0 |
| 3 | Bonaire (H) | 6 | 1 | 1 | 4 | 4 | 8 | −4 | 4 | | 0–1 | 1–1 | — | 0–1 |
| 4 | Montserrat (R) | 6 | 1 | 0 | 5 | 3 | 10 | −7 | 3 | Relegation to League C | 1–4 | 1–2 | 0–1 | — |

Source: CONCACAF
Rules for classification: Tiebreakers
(H) Hosts; (P) Promoted; (R) Relegated

=== Group B ===
| Pos | Team | Pld | W | D | L | GF | GA | GD | Pts | Promotion, qualification or relegation | (Curaçao) | (Saint Lucia) | (Grenada) | (Collectivity of Saint Martin) |
|---|---|---|---|---|---|---|---|---|---|---|---|---|---|---|
| 1 | Curaçao (H, P) | 6 | 4 | 1 | 1 | 15 | 3 | +12 | 13 | Promotion to League A and qualification for Gold Cup | — | 4–1 | 1–0 | 4–0 |
| 2 | Saint Lucia (H) | 6 | 3 | 0 | 3 | 7 | 15 | −8 | 9 | | 2–1 | — | 0–4 | 0–4 |
| 3 | Grenada (H) | 6 | 2 | 1 | 3 | 7 | 6 | +1 | 7 | | 0–0 | 1–2 | — | 0–3 |
| 4 | Saint Martin (R) | 6 | 2 | 0 | 4 | 8 | 13 | −5 | 6 | Relegation to League C | 0–5 | 1–2 | 0–2 | — |

Source: CONCACAF
Rules for classification: Tiebreakers
(H) Hosts; (P) Promoted; (R) Relegated

=== Group C ===
| Pos | Team | Pld | W | D | L | GF | GA | GD | Pts | Promotion, qualification or relegation | (Haiti) | (Puerto Rico) | (Sint Maarten) | (Aruba) |
|---|---|---|---|---|---|---|---|---|---|---|---|---|---|---|
| 1 | Haiti (H, P) | 6 | 6 | 0 | 0 | 29 | 5 | +24 | 18 | Promotion to League A and qualification for Gold Cup | — | 3–0 | 6–0 | 5–3 |
| 2 | Puerto Rico (H) | 6 | 3 | 0 | 3 | 11 | 12 | −1 | 9 | | 1–4 | — | 2–1 | 5–1 |
| 3 | Sint Maarten | 6 | 3 | 0 | 3 | 7 | 18 | −11 | 9 | | 0–8 | 3–2 | — | 2–0 |
| 4 | Aruba (H, R) | 6 | 0 | 0 | 6 | 5 | 17 | −12 | 0 | Relegation to League C | 1–3 | 0–1 | 0–1 | — |

Source: CONCACAF
Rules for classification: Tiebreakers
(H) Hosts; (P) Promoted; (R) Relegated

=== Group D ===
| Pos | Team | Pld | W | D | L | GF | GA | GD | Pts | Promotion, qualification or relegation | (Dominican Republic) | (Bermuda) | (Dominica) | (Antigua and Barbuda) |
|---|---|---|---|---|---|---|---|---|---|---|---|---|---|---|
| 1 | Dominican Republic (H, P) | 6 | 6 | 0 | 0 | 27 | 4 | +23 | 18 | Promotion to League A and qualification for Gold Cup | — | 6–1 | 2–0 | 5–0 |
| 2 | Bermuda (H) | 6 | 4 | 0 | 2 | 15 | 13 | +2 | 12 | Qualification for Gold Cup prelims | 2–3 | — | 3–2 | 2–1 |
| 3 | Dominica | 6 | 1 | 1 | 4 | 6 | 18 | −12 | 4 | | 1–6 | 1–6 | — | 2–1 |
| 4 | Antigua and Barbuda (H, R) | 6 | 0 | 1 | 5 | 2 | 15 | −13 | 1 | Relegation to League C | 0–5 | 0–1 | 0–0 | — |

Source: CONCACAF
Rules for classification: Tiebreakers
(H) Hosts; (P) Promoted; (R) Relegated

=== Ranking of second-placed teams ===
| Pos | Grp | Team | Pld | W | D | L | GF | GA | GD | Pts | Qualification |
|---|---|---|---|---|---|---|---|---|---|---|---|
| 1 | A | Saint Vincent and the Grenadines | 6 | 4 | 1 | 1 | 12 | 7 | +5 | 13 | Qualification for Gold Cup prelims |
| 2 | D | Bermuda | 6 | 4 | 0 | 2 | 15 | 13 | +2 | 12 | Qualification for Gold Cup prelims |
| 3 | C | Puerto Rico | 6 | 3 | 0 | 3 | 11 | 12 | −1 | 9 | |
| 4 | B | Saint Lucia | 6 | 3 | 0 | 3 | 7 | 15 | −8 | 9 | |

Source: CONCACAF
Rules for classification: Tiebreakers

== League C ==
=== Group A ===
| Pos | Team | Pld | W | D | L | GF | GA | GD | Pts | Promotion or qualification | (Barbados) | (The Bahamas) | (United States Virgin Islands) |
|---|---|---|---|---|---|---|---|---|---|---|---|---|---|
| 1 | Barbados (H, P) | 4 | 4 | 0 | 0 | 17 | 4 | +13 | 12 | Promotion to League B and advance to play-in round | — | 6–2 | 3–0 |
| 2 | Bahamas | 4 | 1 | 1 | 2 | 10 | 13 | −3 | 4 | | 2–3 | — | 3–1 |
| 3 | U.S. Virgin Islands (H) | 4 | 0 | 1 | 3 | 4 | 14 | −10 | 1 | | 0–5 | 3–3 | — |

Source: CONCACAF
Rules for classification: Tiebreakers
(H) Hosts; (P) Promoted

=== Group B ===
| Pos | Team | Pld | W | D | L | GF | GA | GD | Pts | Promotion or qualification | (Belize) | (Anguilla) | (Turks and Caicos Islands) |
|---|---|---|---|---|---|---|---|---|---|---|---|---|---|
| 1 | Belize (H, P) | 4 | 4 | 0 | 0 | 9 | 0 | +9 | 12 | Promotion to League B and advance to play-in round | — | 1–0 | 3–0 |
| 2 | Anguilla | 4 | 1 | 0 | 3 | 3 | 4 | −1 | 3 | | 0–1 | — | 2–0 |
| 3 | Turks and Caicos Islands (H) | 4 | 1 | 0 | 3 | 2 | 10 | −8 | 3 | | 0–4 | 2–1 | — |

Source: CONCACAF
Rules for classification: Tiebreakers
(H) Hosts; (P) Promoted

=== Group C ===
| Pos | Team | Pld | W | D | L | GF | GA | GD | Pts | Promotion or qualification | (Saint Kitts and Nevis) | (Cayman Islands) | (British Virgin Islands) |
|---|---|---|---|---|---|---|---|---|---|---|---|---|---|
| 1 | Saint Kitts and Nevis (H, P) | 4 | 3 | 1 | 0 | 10 | 3 | +7 | 10 | Promotion to League B and advance to play-in round | — | 1–1 | 2–0 |
| 2 | Cayman Islands (H, P) | 4 | 2 | 1 | 1 | 4 | 5 | −1 | 7 | Promotion to League B and advance to play-in round | 1–4 | — | 1–0 |
| 3 | British Virgin Islands | 4 | 0 | 0 | 4 | 1 | 7 | −6 | 0 | | 1–3 | 0–1 | — |

Source: CONCACAF
Rules for classification: Tiebreakers
(H) Hosts; (P) Promoted

=== Ranking of second-placed teams ===
| Pos | Grp | Team | Pld | W | D | L | GF | GA | GD | Pts | Promotion |
|---|---|---|---|---|---|---|---|---|---|---|---|
| 1 | C | Cayman Islands (P) | 4 | 2 | 1 | 1 | 4 | 5 | −1 | 7 | Promotion to League B and advance to play-in round |
| 2 | A | Bahamas | 4 | 1 | 1 | 2 | 10 | 13 | −3 | 4 | |
| 3 | B | Anguilla | 4 | 1 | 0 | 3 | 3 | 4 | −1 | 3 | |

Source: CONCACAF
Rules for classification: Tiebreakers
(P) Promoted

== Play-in round ==
The first legs were played on 14 and 15 November, and the second legs were played on 18 and 19 November 2024.

| Team 1 | Agg. | Team 2 | 1st leg | 2nd leg |
|---|---|---|---|---|
| Cayman Islands | 0–7 | Guadeloupe | 0–6 | 0–1 |
| Saint Kitts and Nevis | 2–5 | Cuba | 2–1 | 0–4 |
| Belize | 4–3 | French Guiana | 2–1 | 2–2 |
| Barbados | 4–9 | Guyana | 1–4 | 3–5 |

== Top goalscorers ==
League A
| Rank | Player | Goals |
|---|---|---|
| 1 | (Mexico) Raúl Jiménez | 5 |
| 2 | (Guyana) Osaze De Rosario | 4 |
| 2 | (Guyana) Omari Glasgow | 4 |
| 4 | (French Guiana) Jules Haabo | 3 |
| 4 | (Guyana) Isaiah Jones | 3 |

League B
| Rank | Player | Goals |
|---|---|---|
| 1 | (Dominican Republic) Dorny Romero | 10 |
| 2 | (Haiti) Duckens Nazon | 9 |
| 3 | (Haiti) Frantzdy Pierrot | 7 |
| 4 | (Curaçao) Juninho Bacuna | 5 |
| 4 | (Dominican Republic) Heinz Mörschel | 5 |
| 6 | (Curaçao) Jearl Margaritha | 4 |
| 6 | (Collectivity of Saint Martin) Keelan Lebon | 4 |
| 6 | (Saint Vincent and the Grenadines) Diel Spring | 4 |

League C
| Rank | Player | Goals |
|---|---|---|
| 1 | (Barbados) Niall Reid-Stephen | 8 |
| 2 | (The Bahamas) Brandon Adderley | 6 |
| 3 | (Belize) Jordy Polanco | 4 |
| 3 | (Saint Kitts and Nevis) Tiquanny Williams | 4 |
| 5 | (Barbados) Andre Applewhaite | 3 |
| 6 | (Anguilla) Lamar Carpenter | 2 |
| 6 | (Barbados) Sheran Hoyte | 2 |
| 6 | (Barbados) Omani Leacock | 2 |
| 6 | (Belize) Orlando Velasquez | 2 |

1. ^{+P} Includes goals scored in the play-in round.

Source: CONCACAF
