= Barbados national football team results =

Barbados national football team results may refer to:

- Barbados national football team results (2000–2019)
- Barbados national football team results (2020–present)
