= Thierry Gale =

Barbadian footballer (born 2002)

Personal information
- Full name: Thierry Mikael Gale
- Date of birth: 1 May 2002 (age 24)
- Place of birth: Bridgetown, Barbados
- Height: 1.68 m (5 ft 6 in)
- Position: Winger

Team information
- Current team: Bolton Wanderers
- Number: 11

Youth career
- Pro Shottas United
- 2018–2020: Budapest Honvéd

Senior career*
| Years | Team | Apps | (Gls) |
| 2020–2022 | Budapest Honvéd | 17 | (1) |
| 2020–2022 | Budapest Honvéd II | 24 | (2) |
| 2022–2023 | Dila Gori | 35 | (12) |
| 2023–2025 | Rapid Wien | 6 | (1) |
| 2024 | Rapid Wien II | 3 | (1) |
| 2025 | → Piast Gliwice (loan) | 11 | (1) |
| 2025– | Bolton Wanderers | 44 | (8) |

International career^{‡}
| 2018– | Barbados | 19 | (14) |
- * Club domestic league appearances and goals as of 20:28, 27 September 2026 (UTC) ‡ National team caps and goals as of 13:43, 6 October 2026 (UTC)

Thierry Mikael Gale (born 1 May 2002) is a Barbadian professional footballer who plays as a Winger for EFL Championship club Bolton Wanderers and the Barbados national team.

== Early career ==
Gale played football at St Leonard's Boys School in the Barbados Secondary Schools Football League (BSSFL), leading them to a national title in 2014 at the under-14 level. In 2016, he led the under-16 squad to a double (League and Knockout Cup), finishing as the league's top scorer.

Gale repeated the feat in 2017, scoring three goals (including the game-winner in the final) in the U-16 Knockout Cup, and leading the league with nine goals. That same year, he scored a brace on the final matchday of the U19 League to secure the league title. Two weeks later, he helped St Leonard's secure the double by scoring once in the U19 Knockout Cup final. For his performances, he was named BSSFL Player of the Week.

At the club level, Gale played with the prestigious school, Pro Shottas United. He was named their Player of the Year in 2014. In 2017, he led the under-15 squad to a first-place finish at the Guardian Group Youth Football Competition, capturing MVP honors as well.

== Club career ==
In August 2018, Gale trialled with Hungarian club Budapest Honvéd, along with national team captain Rashad Jules. In an interview with LoopTT, Jules called him "one of Barbados’ finest." Gale officially signed with Budapest Honvéd in October and joined their youth team.

In 2020, he signed his first professional contract, agreeing to a three-year deal with the 14-time champions. Soon thereafter, he made his professional debut on 21 August, coming on for Barna Kesztyűs during a 3–1 league defeat to MTK.

In July 2022, Gale moved to FC Dila Gori of Georgia’s Erovnuli Liga. On 29 August 2023, Gale signed for Austrian Bundesliga club Rapid Wien on a four-year contract.

On 5 February 2025, Gale joined Polish top-flight club Piast Gliwice on loan until the end of 2025, with an option to terminate the loan midway through or make the move permanent. In June 2025, Rapid terminated his loan early.

In July 2025 Gale signed for Bolton Wanderers. It was reported Bolton paid £600,000, the highest fee ever paid for a Barbados footballer. Gale joined the club for training camp in Spain before returning to England, where he made his team debut in a preseason friendly against Barrow on 15 July.

== International career ==
Gale made his full debut for the senior national team in a 0–0 friendly draw against Bermuda on 25 March 2018, entering the match as a substitute for team captain Rashad Jules in the closing minutes. He was 15 years old. He scored his maiden international goal on 5 September 2019 against Saint Martin, a curving free-kick in front of his hometown crowd in Bridgetown to secure a 4–0 victory during the 2019–20 CONCACAF Nations League C.

== Personal life ==
His father, Dwayne Gale, won two Barbados Premier League titles with Paradise, and one with Notre Dame, in the early 2000s. Playing as a forward, he earned two caps with the Barbados national team and enjoyed a stint with Galway United in Ireland.

== Career statistics ==
=== Club ===
As of match played 20 September 2026

Appearances and goals by club, season and competition
| Club | Season | League | | | National cup (Note: Includes Magyar Kupa, Georgian Cup, Austrian Cup, FA Cup) | | League cup (Note: Includes EFL Cup) | | Continental | | Other | | Total | |
| Club | Season | Division | Apps | Goals | Apps | Goals | Apps | Goals | Apps | Goals | Apps | Goals | Apps | Goals |
|---|---|---|---|---|---|---|---|---|---|---|---|---|---|---|
| Budapest Honvéd II | 2020–21 | Nemzeti Bajnokság III | 11 | 0 | — | | — | | — | | — | | 11 | 0 |
| Budapest Honvéd II | 2021–22 | Nemzeti Bajnokság III | 13 | 2 | — | | — | | — | | — | | 13 | 2 |
| Budapest Honvéd II | Total | | 24 | 2 | 0 | 0 | 0 | 0 | 0 | 0 | 0 | 0 | 24 | 2 |
| Budapest Honvéd | 2020–21 | Nemzeti Bajnokság I | 9 | 1 | 3 | 2 | — | | 0 | 0 | — | | 12 | 3 |
| Budapest Honvéd | 2021–22 | Nemzeti Bajnokság I | 8 | 0 | 1 | 0 | — | | — | | — | | 9 | 0 |
| Budapest Honvéd | Total | | 17 | 1 | 4 | 2 | 0 | 0 | 0 | 0 | 0 | 0 | 21 | 3 |
| Dila Gori | 2022 | Erovnuli Liga | 16 | 2 | 3 | 2 | — | | 2 (Note: Appearance(s) in UEFA Conference League) | 0 | — | | 21 | 4 |
| Dila Gori | 2023 | Erovnuli Liga | 19 | 10 | 0 | 0 | — | | 6 | 2 | 2 (Note: Appearances in Georgian Super Cup) | 0 | 27 | 12 |
| Dila Gori | Total | | 35 | 12 | 3 | 2 | 0 | 0 | 8 | 2 | 2 | 0 | 48 | 16 |
| Rapid Wien | 2023–24 | Austrian Bundesliga | 5 | 1 | 2 | 0 | — | | — | | — | | 7 | 1 |
| Rapid Wien | 2024–25 | Austrian Bundesliga | 1 | 0 | 0 | 0 | — | | 1 | 0 | — | | 2 | 0 |
| Rapid Wien | Total | | 6 | 1 | 2 | 0 | 0 | 0 | 1 | 0 | — | | 9 | 1 |
| Rapid Wien II | 2024–25 | 2. Liga | 3 | 1 | — | | — | | — | | — | | 3 | 1 |
| Piast Gliwice (loan) | 2024–25 | Ekstraklasa | 11 | 1 | 0 | 0 | — | | — | | — | | 11 | 1 |
| Bolton Wanderers | 2025–26 | EFL League One | 36 | 5 | 1 | 0 | 1 | 1 | — | | 4 (Note: Two appearances and one goal in EFL Trophy, two appearances in League One play-offs) | 1 | 42 | 7 |
| Bolton Wanderers | 2026–27 | EFL Championship | 8 | 3 | 0 | 0 | 1 | 0 | — | | — | | 9 | 3 |
| Bolton Wanderers | Total | | 44 | 8 | 1 | 0 | 2 | 1 | — | | 4 | 1 | 51 | 10 |
| Career total | | | 140 | 26 | 10 | 4 | 2 | 1 | 9 | 2 | 6 | 1 | 167 | 34 |

=== International ===
As of match played 5 October 2026

Appearances and goals by national team and year
| National team | Year | Apps | Goals |
|---|---|---|---|
| Barbados | 2018 | 4 | 0 |
| Barbados | 2019 | 2 | 1 |
| Barbados | 2021 | 1 | 0 |
| Barbados | 2023 | 6 | 5 |
| Barbados | 2024 | 2 | 2 |
| Barbados | 2025 | 0 | 0 |
| Barbados | 2026 | 4 | 6 |
| Total | | 19 | 14 |

Scores and results list Barbados' goal tally first, score column indicates score after each Gale goal.

List of international goals scored by Thierry Gale
| No. | Date | Venue | Opponent | Score | Result | Competition |
|---|---|---|---|---|---|---|
| 1 | 5 September 2019 | Wildey Turf, Bridgetown, Barbados | Saint Martin | 4–0 | 4–0 | 2019–20 CONCACAF Nations League C |
| 2 | 26 March 2023 | Sir Vivian Richards Stadium, North Sound, Antigua and Barbuda | Antigua and Barbuda | 1–1 | 2–1 | 2022–23 CONCACAF Nations League B |
| 3 | 8 September 2023 | Wildey Turf, Bridgetown, Barbados | Montserrat | 2–1 | 2–3 | 2023–24 CONCACAF Nations League B |
| 4 | 11 September 2023 | Estadio Nacional, Managua, Nicaragua | Nicaragua | 1–5 | 1–5 | 2023–24 CONCACAF Nations League B |
| 5 | 16 October 2023 | Estadio Complejo Deportivo Moca 86, Moca, Dominican Republic | Dominican Republic | 1–0 | 2–5 | 2023–24 CONCACAF Nations League B |
| 6 | 16 October 2023 | Estadio Complejo Deportivo Moca 86, Moca, Dominican Republic | Dominican Republic | 2–4 | 2–5 | 2023–24 CONCACAF Nations League B |
| 7 | 19 November 2024 | Synthetic Track and Field Facility, Leonora, Guyana | Guyana | 1–3 | 3–5 | 2025 CONCACAF Gold Cup qualification play-in |
| 8 | 19 November 2024 | Synthetic Track and Field Facility, Leonora, Guyana | Guyana | 3–4 | 3–5 | 2025 CONCACAF Gold Cup qualification play-in |
| 9 | 25 September 2026 | Daren Sammy Cricket Ground, Gros Islet, Saint Lucia | Saint Lucia | 1–0 | 2–0 | 2026–27 CONCACAF Nations League B |
| 10 | 28 September 2026 | Daren Sammy Cricket Ground, Gros Islet, Saint Lucia | Guadeloupe | 1–1 | 2–2 | 2026–27 CONCACAF Nations League B |
| 11 | 2 October 2026 | Wildey Turf, Wildey, Barbados | Bermuda | 1–1 | 4–1 | 2026–27 CONCACAF Nations League B |
| 12 | 2 October 2026 | Wildey Turf, Wildey, Barbados | Bermuda | 3–1 | 4–1 | 2026–27 CONCACAF Nations League B |
| 13 | 5 October 2026 | Wildey Turf, Wildey, Barbados | Bermuda | 1–1 | 2–1 | 2026–27 CONCACAF Nations League B |
| 14 | 5 October 2026 | Wildey Turf, Wildey, Barbados | Bermuda | 2–1 | 2–1 | 2026–27 CONCACAF Nations League B |

== Honours ==
Bolton Wanderers

- EFL League One play-offs: 2026
