= 2024–25 CONCACAF Nations League C =

Tournament details
- Dates: 4 September – 15 October 2024
- Teams: 9
- Promoted: Barbados; Belize; Cayman Islands; Saint Kitts and Nevis

Tournament statistics
- Matches played: 18
- Goals scored: 60 (3.33 per match)
- Top scorer(s): (Barbados) Niall Reid-Stephen (8 goals)

The 2024–25 CONCACAF Nations League C was the third and lowest division of the 2024–25 edition of the CONCACAF Nations League, the fourth season of the international football competition involving the men's national teams of the 41 member associations of CONCACAF. It was held from 4 September to 15 October 2024.

== Format ==
League C maintained the same format introduced for the 2023–24 season, but this edition included a play-in round after the conclusion of the groups. In addition, the group matches were played at centralized venues instead of the previous home-and-away format.

The nine participating teams were split into three groups of three teams and each group was played on a double round-robin basis, with matches being held in the official FIFA match windows in September and October 2024. The first-placed team of each group and the best second-placed team among all groups were promoted to the 2026–27 CONCACAF Nations League B. They also advanced to the play-in round, in which they joined four teams from League A in order to compete to qualify for the 2025 CONCACAF Gold Cup qualification tournament.

=== 2025 CONCACAF Gold Cup qualification ===
As announced by CONCACAF in February 2023, the 2024–25 CONCACAF Nations League served as a qualifier for the 2025 CONCACAF Gold Cup. League C teams could not qualify directly for the 2025 CONCACAF Gold Cup final tournament, but could qualify via the Gold Cup qualification tournament (also called CONCACAF Gold Cup prelims).

== Teams ==
A total of nine national teams contested League C, including the five sides that failed to be promoted last season and four teams relegated from the 2023–24 League B.

=== Team changes ===
The following were the team changes in League C regarding the 2023–24 season:

Incoming
Relegated from
Nations League B
- Bahamas
- Barbados
- Belize
- Saint Kitts and Nevis

Outgoing
Promoted to
Nations League B
- Aruba
- Bonaire
- Dominica
- Saint Martin

=== Seeding ===
The pots were confirmed on 19 April 2024, with the nine League C teams being split into three pots of three teams, based on the CONCACAF Rankings as of 31 March 2024.

Pot 1
Team	Rank	Pts
Saint Kitts and Nevis	25	779
Belize	29	737
Barbados	33	558

Pot 2
Team	Rank	Pts
Bahamas	36	479
Cayman Islands	37	393
Turks and Caicos Islands	38	324

Pot 3
Team	Rank	Pts
British Virgin Islands	39	207
U.S. Virgin Islands	40	155
Anguilla	41	150

=== Draw ===
The draw for the groups composition was held on 6 May 2024, 19:00 EDT (UTC−4), in Miami, Florida, United States, where the nine involved teams were drawn into three groups of three. The draw began by randomly selecting a team from Pot 1 and placing them in Group A and then selecting the remaining teams from Pot 1 and placing them into groups B and C in sequential order. The draw continued with the same procedure done for the remaining pots.

The draw resulted in the following groups:

Group A
Pos	Team
A1	Barbados
A2	Bahamas
A3	U.S. Virgin Islands

Group B
Pos	Team
B1	Belize
B2	Turks and Caicos Islands
B3	Anguilla

Group C
Pos	Team
C1	Saint Kitts and Nevis
C2	Cayman Islands
C3	British Virgin Islands

== Groups ==
In an effort to reduce the travel disruptions faced by teams in previous editions, CONCACAF decided that the League C matches scheduled in each FIFA match window would be held at a centralized venue.

In this way, the national association of the second-highest ranked team in each group, once the draw was made, was responsible for hosting all matches in its group scheduled for the September FIFA match window. Likewise, the top-ranked team in each group, once the draw was made, was responsible for hosting all matches in its group scheduled in the October FIFA match window. If a national association was unable to host matches, CONCACAF reserved the right to select another venue. The match schedule (including days) was predetermined to provide proper rest time in between matches.

September FIFA Window
Mon 2	Tue 3	Wed 4	Thu 5	Fri 6	Sat 7	Sun 8	Mon 9	Tue 10
—N/a		3 v 2	Rest days		2 v 1	Rest days		1 v 3

October FIFA Window
Mon 7	Tue 8	Wed 9	Thu 10	Fri 11	Sat 12	Sun 13	Mon 14	Tue 15
—N/a		2 v 3	Rest days		3 v 1	Rest days		1 v 2

The fixture list was confirmed by CONCACAF on 23 May 2024. All match times are in EDT (UTC−4) as listed by CONCACAF (local times, if different, are in parentheses).

=== Group A ===
By regulation, September's Group A matches had to be held in Bahamas as the second highest-ranked team in the group. However, the Bahamas was unable to host the matches, and thus CONCACAF designated the U.S. Virgin Islands as the venue.

Pos	Team	Pld	W	D	L	GF	GA	GD	Pts	Promotion or qualification	(Barbados)	(The Bahamas)	(United States Virgin Islands)
1	Barbados (H, P)	4	4	0	0	17	4	+13	12	Promotion to League B and advance to play-in round	—	6–2	3–0
2	Bahamas	4	1	1	2	10	13	−3	4		2–3	—	3–1
3	U.S. Virgin Islands (H)	4	0	1	3	4	14	−10	1		0–5	3–3	—

Source: CONCACAF
Rules for classification: Tiebreakers
(H) Hosts; (P) Promoted
4 September 2024
16:00

U.S. Virgin Islands	3–3	Bahamas
Henry 27'; Joseph 77'; Catone-Highfield 86'	Report	St. Fleur 2' (pen.); Julmis 37'; Adderley 58'

Bethlehem Soccer Stadium, Upper Bethlehem (U.S. Virgin Islands)
Referee: Jefferson Escobar (Honduras)
7 September 2024
16:00

Bahamas	2–3	Barbados
Adderley 42', 66'	Report	Applewhite 10'; Taylor 80'; An. Applewhaite 82'

Bethlehem Soccer Stadium, Upper Bethlehem (U.S. Virgin Islands)
Referee: Shavin Greene (Guyana)
10 September 2024
16:00

Barbados	3–0	U.S. Virgin Islands
Hinkson 15'; Reid-Stephen 86', 90+3'	Report

Bethlehem Soccer Stadium, Upper Bethlehem (U.S. Virgin Islands)
Referee: Sergio Rozenhout (Suriname)

9 October 2024
20:00

U.S. Virgin Islands	0–5	Barbados
	Report	Holligan 42'; Reid-Stephen 45+2' (pen.), 47', 65'; Leacock 90+2'

Wildey Turf, Wildey (Barbados)
Referee: José Valladares (Honduras)
12 October 2024
20:00

Bahamas	3–1	U.S. Virgin Islands
Adderley 13', 23'; Bain 30'	Report	Edgar 69'

Wildey Turf, Wildey (Barbados)
Attendance: 65
Referee: Benjamin Whitty (Cayman Islands)
15 October 2024
20:00

Barbados	6–2	Bahamas
Applewhaite 8', 52'; Reid-Stephen 14' (pen.); Hoyte 26', 64'; Leacock 47'	Report	Adderley 6'; Brathwaite 43' (o.g.)

Wildey Turf, Wildey
Referee: Micheal Akangou (Cayman Islands)

=== Group B ===
Pos	Team	Pld	W	D	L	GF	GA	GD	Pts	Promotion or qualification	(Belize)	(Anguilla)	(Turks and Caicos Islands)
1	Belize (H, P)	4	4	0	0	9	0	+9	12	Promotion to League B and advance to play-in round	—	1–0	3–0
2	Anguilla	4	1	0	3	3	4	−1	3		0–1	—	2–0
3	Turks and Caicos Islands (H)	4	1	0	3	2	10	−8	3		0–4	2–1	—

Source: CONCACAF
Rules for classification: Tiebreakers
(H) Hosts; (P) Promoted
4 September 2024
15:00

Anguilla	2–0	Turks and Caicos Islands
Hughes 57'; Carpenter 74'	Report

TCIFA National Academy, Providenciales (Turks and Caicos Islands)
Referee: José Fuentes (Guatemala)
7 September 2024
15:00

Turks and Caicos Islands	0–4	Belize
	Report	Velasquez 12'; Polanco 43', 73'; Palacio 66'

TCIFA National Academy, Providenciales
Attendance: 271
Referee: Cleon Culley (Barbados)
10 September 2024
15:00

Belize	1–0	Anguilla
Polanco 27'	Report

TCIFA National Academy, Providenciales (Turks and Caicos Islands)
Referee: Steffon Dewar (Jamaica)

9 October 2024
22:00 (20:00 UTC−6)

Anguilla	0–1	Belize
	Report	Velasquez 56'

FFB Stadium, Belmopan (Belize)
Attendance: 522
Referee: Ray Torres (Puerto Rico)
12 October 2024
22:00 (20:00 UTC−6)

Turks and Caicos Islands	2–1	Anguilla
Martin 3'; Jerome 90+5' (pen.)	Report	Carpenter 59'

FFB Stadium, Belmopan (Belize)
Referee: Ekaterina Koroleva (United States)
15 October 2024
22:00 (20:00 UTC−6)

Belize	3–0	Turks and Caicos Islands
Polanco 28'; Hernández 40'; Lopez 57'	Report

FFB Stadium, Belmopan
Referee: Victor Rivas (United States)

=== Group C ===
Pos	Team	Pld	W	D	L	GF	GA	GD	Pts	Promotion or qualification	(Saint Kitts and Nevis)	(Cayman Islands)	(British Virgin Islands)
1	Saint Kitts and Nevis (H, P)	4	3	1	0	10	3	+7	10	Promotion to League B and advance to play-in round	—	1–1	2–0
2	Cayman Islands (H, P)	4	2	1	1	4	5	−1	7	Promotion to League B and advance to play-in round	1–4	—	1–0
3	British Virgin Islands	4	0	0	4	1	7	−6	0		1–3	0–1	—

Source: CONCACAF
Rules for classification: Tiebreakers
(H) Hosts; (P) Promoted
4 September 2024
16:30 (15:30 UTC−5)

British Virgin Islands	0–1	Cayman Islands
	Report	Seymour 84'

Truman Bodden Sports Complex, George Town (Cayman Islands)
Referee: Jonathan Leiton (Costa Rica)
7 September 2024
16:30 (15:30 UTC−5)

Cayman Islands	1–4	Saint Kitts and Nevis
Duval 51'	Report	Rogers 10'; Williams 19', 37'; Stephen 72'

Truman Bodden Sports Complex, George Town
Referee: Moeth Gaymes (Saint Vincent and the Grenadines)
10 September 2024
16:30 (15:30 UTC−5)

Saint Kitts and Nevis	2–0	British Virgin Islands
Williams 11', 64'	Report

Truman Bodden Sports Complex, George Town (Cayman Islands)
Referee: Andrew Samuel (Puerto Rico)

9 October 2024
15:30

British Virgin Islands	1–3	Saint Kitts and Nevis
Javier 46'	Report	Roberts 25'; Amory 37'; I. Williams 90+5' (o.g.)

Warner Park Sporting Complex, Basseterre (Saint Kitts and Nevis)
Attendance: 1,004
Referee: Vimarest Díaz (Dominican Republic)
12 October 2024
15:30

Cayman Islands	1–0	British Virgin Islands
Douglas 69'	Report

Warner Park Sporting Complex, Basseterre (Saint Kitts and Nevis)
Attendance: 100
Referee: Ricangel de Leça (Aruba)
15 October 2024
15:30

Saint Kitts and Nevis	1–1	Cayman Islands
Campbell 90+9' (o.g.)	Report	Scott 61'

Warner Park Sporting Complex, Basseterre
Referee: Shekiel Jokil (Suriname)

=== Ranking of second-placed teams ===
Pos	Grp	Team	Pld	W	D	L	GF	GA	GD	Pts	Promotion
1	C	Cayman Islands (P)	4	2	1	1	4	5	−1	7	Promotion to League B and advance to play-in round
2	A	Bahamas	4	1	1	2	10	13	−3	4	
3	B	Anguilla	4	1	0	3	3	4	−1	3	

Source: CONCACAF
Rules for classification: Tiebreakers
(P) Promoted

== Goalscorers ==
There were 60 goals scored in 18 matches, for an average of 3.33 goals per match.

6 goals

- (The Bahamas) Brandon Adderley
- (Barbados) Niall Reid-Stephen

4 goals

- (Belize) Jordy Polanco
- (Saint Kitts and Nevis) Tiquanny Williams

3 goals

- (Barbados) Andre Applewhaite

2 goals

- (Anguilla) Lamar Carpenter
- (Barbados) Sheran Hoyte
- (Barbados) Omani Leacock
- (Belize) Orlando Velasquez

1 goal

- (Anguilla) Germain Hughes
- (The Bahamas) Wood Julmis
- (The Bahamas) Omari Bain
- (The Bahamas) Lesly St. Fleur
- (Barbados) Zachary Applewhite
- (Barbados) Carl Hinkson
- (Barbados) Hadan Holligan
- (Barbados) Ethan Taylor
- (Belize) Moisés Hernández
- (Belize) Krisean Lopez
- (Belize) Michael Palacio
- (British Virgin Islands) Kristian Javier
- (Cayman Islands) Dimetri Douglas
- (Cayman Islands) Mason Duval
- (Cayman Islands) Zachary Scott
- (Cayman Islands) Elijah Seymour
- (Saint Kitts and Nevis) G'Vaune Amory
- (Saint Kitts and Nevis) Malique Roberts
- (Saint Kitts and Nevis) Kimaree Rogers
- (Saint Kitts and Nevis) Dionis Stephen
- (Turks and Caicos Islands) Ledson Jerome
- (Turks and Caicos Islands) Emmanuel Martin
- (United States Virgin Islands) Hasani Edgar
- (United States Virgin Islands) Gabriel Catone-Highfield
- (United States Virgin Islands) Naqwan Henry
- (United States Virgin Islands) Rakeem Joseph

1 own goal

- (Barbados) Nicoli Brathwaite (against Bahamas)
- (British Virgin Islands) Ikyjah Williams (against Saint Kitts and Nevis)
- (Cayman Islands) Joshwa Campbell (against Saint Kitts and Nevis)
