= 2024–25 CONCACAF Nations League A =

Tournament details
- Dates: Group phase: 5 September – 15 October 2024; Quarter-finals: 11–19 November 2024; Nations League Finals: 20–23 March 2025
- Teams: 16

Final positions
- Champions: Mexico (1st title)
- Runners-up: Panama
- Third place: Canada
- Fourth place: United States
- Relegated: Cuba; French Guiana; Guadeloupe; Guyana

Tournament statistics
- Matches played: 36
- Goals scored: 93 (2.58 per match)
- Top scorer: (Mexico) Raúl Jiménez (5 goals)

The 2024–25 CONCACAF Nations League A was the top division of the 2024–25 edition of the CONCACAF Nations League, the fourth season of the international football competition involving the men's national teams of the 41 member associations of CONCACAF. The initial group stage was held from 5 September to 15 October 2024.

League A culminated with the Nations League Finals in March 2025 to crown the champions of the CONCACAF Nations League.

This edition of the CONCACAF Nations League A served to determine the four teams that qualify directly for the 2025 CONCACAF Gold Cup in the United States. The top four teams qualified for the final tournament, while the remaining League A teams could still qualify via the 2025 CONCACAF Gold Cup qualification tournament.

== Format ==
League A maintained the same format introduced for the 2023–24 season, consisting of a group stage, a quarter-finals round and the finals. The 16 involved teams entered the competition in the group stage or directly into the quarter-finals according to their position in the CONCACAF Rankings (as of 31 March 2024), with the 12 lowest-ranked teams entering the group stage and the top four ranked teams receiving a direct pass to the quarter-final round.

The group stage consisted of two groups of six teams, with each team playing four matches against opponents of its group (two at home and two away) on a Swiss-system basis. The top two teams from each group advanced to the quarter-finals where they joined the four teams that qualified directly to this round. The bottom two teams from each group were relegated to the 2026–27 CONCACAF Nations League B, but also advanced to the play-in round, in which they joined four teams from League C in order to compete to qualify for the 2025 CONCACAF Gold Cup qualification tournament.

The quarter-finals were played on a two-legged home-and-away basis, with the four winners advancing to the Nations League Finals and qualifying directly to the 2025 CONCACAF Gold Cup. The Nations League Finals, consisting of a semi-final round, third place play-off and the final match, were played in March 2025 at a centralised venue in Inglewood, California.

=== 2025 CONCACAF Gold Cup qualification ===
As announced by CONCACAF in February 2023, the 2024–25 CONCACAF Nations League served as a qualifier for the 2025 CONCACAF Gold Cup. League A teams qualified for the 2025 CONCACAF Gold Cup final tournament or the Gold Cup qualification tournament (also called CONCACAF Gold Cup prelims) or advanced to the play-in round based on their performance in the group stage and quarter-finals round, as follows:

- The four quarter-finals winners (i.e., the four teams involved in the finals) qualified directly for the 2025 CONCACAF Gold Cup.
- The four quarter-finals losers qualified for the 2025 CONCACAF Gold Cup qualification tournament.
- The third and fourth placed teams of each group also qualified for the 2025 CONCACAF Gold Cup qualification tournament.
- The fifth and sixth placed teams of each group advanced to the play-in round, where they faced the top four teams in the League C for the last four slots in the 2025 CONCACAF Gold Cup qualification tournament.

== Teams ==
A total of sixteen national teams contested League A, including the top twelve sides from the 2023–24 season and four promoted from the 2023–24 League B.

=== Team changes ===
The following were the team changes in League A regarding the 2023–24 season:

Incoming
Promoted from
Nations League B
- French Guiana
- Guadeloupe
- Guyana
- Nicaragua

Outgoing
Relegated to
Nations League B
- Curaçao
- El Salvador
- Grenada
- Haiti

==== Teams promoted from League B ====
French Guiana, Guadeloupe and Guyana reached the top flight of the CONCACAF Nations League for the first time, with French Guiana and Guyana spending the first three seasons in League B while Guadeloupe started in League C in the inaugural edition before spending two seasons in League B. Nicaragua had already been promoted to the League A in the previous season but were disqualified for regulatory reasons before the start of the season, so this was their first appearance in CONCACAF Nations League A.

=== Seeding ===
The pots were confirmed on 19 April 2024, with the lowest twelve League A ranked teams, based on the CONCACAF Rankings as of 31 March 2024, being split into six pots of two teams. The top four ranked teams (Mexico, the United States, Panama and Canada) were directly seeded in the quarter-finals.

Pot	Team	Rank	Pts
1	Jamaica	5	1,677
1	Costa Rica	6	1,621
2	Honduras	7	1,431
2	Guatemala	9	1,395
3	Trinidad and Tobago	10	1,344
3	Martinique	11	1,322
4	Cuba	13	1,158
4	Guadeloupe	15	1,119
5	Nicaragua	16	1,112
5	Suriname	17	1,070
6	French Guiana	18	1,058
6	Guyana	19	1,054

=== Draw ===
The group stage draw was held on 6 May 2024, 19:00 EDT (UTC−4), in Miami, Florida, United States, where the twelve involved teams were drawn into two groups of six. The draw began by randomly selecting a team from Pot 1 and placing them into Group A and then selecting the remaining team from Pot 1 and placing them into Group B. The draw continued with the same procedure done for the remaining pots.

The draw resulted in the following groups:

Group A
Pos	Team
A1	Costa Rica
A2	Guatemala
A3	Martinique
A4	Guadeloupe
A5	Suriname
A6	Guyana

Group B
Pos	Team
B1	Jamaica
B2	Honduras
B3	Trinidad and Tobago
B4	Cuba
B5	Nicaragua
B6	French Guiana

== Group stage ==
The fixture list was confirmed by CONCACAF on 23 May 2024. All match times are in EDT (UTC−4) as listed by CONCACAF (local times, if different, are in parentheses).

=== Group A ===
Pos	Team	Pld	W	D	L	GF	GA	GD	Pts	Qualification or relegation	(Costa Rica)	(Suriname)	(Guatemala)	(Martinique)	(Guadeloupe)	(Guyana)
1	Costa Rica	4	2	2	0	7	1	+6	8	Advance to quarter-finals	—	—	3–0	—	3–0	—
2	Suriname	4	2	1	1	9	4	+5	7	Advance to quarter-finals	1–1	—	—	—	—	5–1
3	Guatemala	4	2	1	1	6	5	+1	7	Qualification for Gold Cup prelims	0–0	—	—	3–1	—	—
4	Martinique	4	1	2	1	4	5	−1	5	Qualification for Gold Cup prelims	—	—	—	—	0–0	2–2
5	Guadeloupe (R)	4	1	1	2	1	4	−3	4	Advance to play-in and relegation to League B	—	1–0	—	0–1	—	—
6	Guyana (R)	4	0	1	3	5	13	−8	1	Advance to play-in and relegation to League B	—	1–3	1–3	—	—	—

Source: CONCACAF
Rules for classification: Tiebreakers
(R) Relegated
5 September 2024
16:00

Guyana	1–3	Suriname
Glasgow 43' (pen.)	Report	Van der Kust 18'; Montnor 66'; Misidjan 83'

Synthetic Track and Field Facility, Leonora
Attendance: 500
Referee: Christopher Mason (Jamaica)
5 September 2024
20:00 (18:00 UTC−6)

Costa Rica	3–0	Guadeloupe
Calvo 50'; Lassiter 77'; Madrigal 80'	Report

Estadio Nacional, San José
Attendance: 7,542
Referee: Katia García (Mexico)
5 September 2024
22:00 (20:00 UTC−6)

Guatemala	3–1	Martinique
Rubín 3'; Pinto 61' (pen.); Martínez 90+5'	Report	Appin 51'

Estadio Doroteo Guamuch Flores, Guatemala City
Attendance: 14,006
Referee: José Torres (Puerto Rico)

9 September 2024
16:00

Guadeloupe	1–0	Suriname
Leborgne 67'	Report

Stade Roger Zami, Le Gosier
Attendance: 1,850
Referee: Reon Radix (Grenada)
9 September 2024
16:00

Martinique	2–2	Guyana
Labeau 45+2'; Varane 86'	Report	I. Jones 14', 24'

Stade Pierre-Aliker, Fort-de-France
Attendance: 220
Referee: Kwinsi Williams (Trinidad and Tobago)
9 September 2024
22:00 (20:00 UTC−6)

Guatemala	0–0	Costa Rica
	Report

Estadio Doroteo Guamuch Flores, Guatemala City
Attendance: 18,115
Referee: Daniel Quintero (Mexico)

11 October 2024
16:00

Guadeloupe	0–1	Martinique
	Report	Labeau 86'

Stade Roger Zami, Le Gosier
Attendance: 1,820
Referee: Selvin Brown (Honduras)
11 October 2024
18:00 (19:00 UTC−3)

Suriname	1–1	Costa Rica
Vlijter 34'	Report	Alcócer 12'

Dr. Ir. Franklin Essed Stadion, Paramaribo
Attendance: 3,274
Referee: Adonai Escobedo (Mexico)
11 October 2024
21:00

Guyana	1–3	Guatemala
Duke-McKenna 31'	Report	Santis 17', 68'; Castellanos 61'

Synthetic Track and Field Facility, Leonora
Attendance: 756
Referee: Ismael Cornejo (El Salvador)

15 October 2024
20:00 (18:00 UTC−6)

Costa Rica	3–0	Guatemala
Madrigal 9'; Vargas 38'; Calvo 72'	Report

Estadio Nacional, San José
Attendance: 20,450
Referee: Joe Dickerson (United States)
15 October 2024
20:00

Martinique	0–0	Guadeloupe
	Report

Stade Roger Zami, Le Gosier (Guadeloupe) (Note: Martinique played their home match against Guadeloupe at Stade Roger Zami in Le Gosier (Guadeloupe) instead of the originally scheduled stadium Stade Pierre-Aliker, Fort-de-France due to security reasons related to the 2024 social unrest in Martinique.)
Attendance: 1,550
Referee: Pierre-Luc Lauzière (Canada)
15 October 2024
20:00 (21:00 UTC−3)

Suriname	5–1	Guyana
Becker 3', 10'; Misidjan 33'; Jubitana 51'; Haps 69'	Report	J. Jones 13'

Dr. Ir. Franklin Essed Stadion, Paramaribo
Attendance: 3,274
Referee: Steffon Dewar (Jamaica)

=== Group B ===
Pos	Team	Pld	W	D	L	GF	GA	GD	Pts	Qualification or relegation	(Jamaica)	(Honduras)	(Nicaragua)	(Trinidad and Tobago)	(Cuba)	(French Guiana)
1	Jamaica	4	2	2	0	4	1	+3	8	Advance to quarter-finals	—	0–0	—	—	0–0	—
2	Honduras	4	2	1	1	8	4	+4	7	Advance to quarter-finals	1–2	—	—	4–0	—	—
3	Nicaragua	4	2	1	1	5	5	0	7	Qualification for Gold Cup prelims	0–2	—	—	—	—	3–2
4	Trinidad and Tobago	4	1	2	1	5	7	−2	5	Qualification for Gold Cup prelims	—	—	—	—	3–1	0–0
5	Cuba (R)	4	0	3	1	4	6	−2	3	Advance to play-in and relegation to League B	—	—	1–1	2–2	—	—
6	French Guiana (R)	4	0	1	3	4	7	−3	1	Advance to play-in and relegation to League B	—	2–3	0–1	—	—	—

Source: CONCACAF
Rules for classification: Tiebreakers
(R) Relegated
6 September 2024
15:00 (16:00 UTC−3)

French Guiana	0–1	Nicaragua
	Report	Talavera 90+5'

Stade Municipal Dr. Edmard Lama, Remire-Montjoly
Attendance: 450
Referee: Julio Luna (Guatemala)
6 September 2024
20:00 (19:00 UTC−5)

Jamaica	0–0	Cuba
	Report

Independence Park, Kingston
Attendance: 9,900
Referee: Filiberto Martínez (El Salvador)
6 September 2024
22:00 (20:00 UTC−6)

Honduras	4–0	Trinidad and Tobago
A. López 39'; Arriaga 45+2'; Rodríguez 54'; Ruiz 86'	Report

Estadio Nacional Chelato Uclés, Tegucigalpa
Attendance: 7,481
Referee: Tori Penso (United States)

10 September 2024
16:00

Cuba	1–1	Nicaragua
Espino 42' (pen.)	Report	Talavera 90+7'

Estadio Antonio Maceo, Santiago de Cuba
Attendance: 3,565
Referee: Pierre-Luc Lauzière (Canada)
10 September 2024
19:00

Trinidad and Tobago	0–0	French Guiana
	Report

Dwight Yorke Stadium, Bacolet
Attendance: 2,100
Referee: Adonis Carrasco (Dominican Republic)
10 September 2024
22:00 (20:00 UTC−6)

Honduras	1–2	Jamaica
Ruiz 50'	Report	Maldonado 49' (o.g.); Antonio 76' (pen.)

Estadio Nacional Chelato Uclés, Tegucigalpa
Referee: Víctor Cáceres (Mexico)

10 October 2024
15:30 (16:30 UTC−3)

French Guiana	2–3	Honduras
Galas 56'; Haabo 90+4'	Report	Lozano 45+1'; D. Flores 67'; Benguché 74'

Stade omnisport, Sinnamary (Note: French Guiana played their home match against Honduras at Stade omnisport, Sinnamary instead of the originally scheduled Stade Municipal Dr. Edmard Lama, Remire-Montjoly which did not meet CONCACAF requirements (playing field in poor condition).)
Attendance: 204
Referee: Lukasz Szpala (United States)
10 October 2024
16:00

Cuba	2–2	Trinidad and Tobago
Reyes 64'; Casanova 75'	Report	Bateau 8'; J. Jones 70'

Estadio Antonio Maceo, Santiago de Cuba
Attendance: 4,500
Referee: Sergio Reyna (Guatemala)
10 October 2024
22:00 (20:00 UTC−6)

Nicaragua	0–2	Jamaica
	Report	Quijano 32' (o.g.); Williams 69'

Estadio Nacional de Fútbol, Managua
Attendance: 16,630
Referee: Mario Escobar (Guatemala)

14 October 2024
21:00 (20:00 UTC−5)

Jamaica	0–0	Honduras
	Report

Independence Park, Kingston
Attendance: 11,263
Referee: Armando Villarreal (United States)
14 October 2024
21:00

Trinidad and Tobago	3–1	Cuba
Gilbert 13'; J. Jones 28'; Gill 65'	Report	Matos 62'

Dwight Yorke Stadium, Bacolet
Attendance: 3,543
Referee: Bryan López (Guatemala)
14 October 2024
21:00 (19:00 UTC−6)

Nicaragua	3–2	French Guiana
Moreno 54'; Barrera 79'; Fletes 84'	Report	Baal 16'; Haabo 62'

Estadio Nacional de Fútbol, Managua
Attendance: 12,634
Referee: Iván Barton (El Salvador)

== Quarter-finals ==
The quarter-finals pairings were determined based on the CONCACAF Rankings published after the October 2024 FIFA Match Window for the four pre-seeded teams and the group stage results for the winners and runners-up of each group.

Seeded teams
Pos	Team	Rank (Note: CONCACAF rankings (as of 16 October 2024))	Pts
1	Mexico	1	1,900
2	Canada	2	1,807
3	United States	3	1,776
4	Panama	4	1,730

Group stage winners and runners-up
Rank	Grp	Team	Pld	W	D	L	GF	GA	GD	Pts
1	A	Costa Rica	4	2	2	0	7	1	+6	8
2	B	Jamaica	4	2	2	0	4	1	+3	8
3	A	Suriname	4	2	1	1	9	4	+5	7
4	B	Honduras	4	2	1	1	8	4	+4	7

Source: CONCACAF
Rules for classification: Tiebreakers

The match-ups were as follows:

- Quarter-final 1 (QF1): Fourth-ranked pre-seeded team vs Best ranked group winner
- Quarter-final 2 (QF2): Third-ranked pre-seeded team vs Worst ranked group winner
- Quarter-final 3 (QF3): Second-ranked pre-seeded team vs Best ranked group runner-up
- Quarter-final 4 (QF4): First-ranked pre-seeded team vs Worst ranked group runner-up

Each tie was played on a home-and-away two-legged basis, with the order of legs being decided by the four pre-seeded teams that received a direct bye to the quarter-finals (Canada, Mexico, Panama and the United States). If the aggregate score was level at the end of the second leg the away goals rule was applied. If away goals were also equal, then 30 minutes of extra time were played without taking into account the away goals rule during this time. If still tied after extra time, the tie was decided by a penalty shoot-out.

Winners advanced to the Nations League Finals and qualified for the 2025 CONCACAF Gold Cup, while losers qualified for the 2025 CONCACAF Gold Cup qualification tournament.

=== Summary ===
The first legs were played on 14 and 15 November, and the second legs were played on 18 and 19 November 2024.

Team 1	Agg.	Team 2	1st leg	2nd leg
Costa Rica	2–3	Panama	0–1	2–2
Jamaica	2–5	United States	0–1	2–4
Suriname	0–4	Canada	0–1	0–3
Honduras	2–4	Mexico	2–0	0–4

=== Matches ===
The fixture list was confirmed by CONCACAF on 23 May 2024, with the matchups being confirmed on 16 October 2024. All match times are in EST (UTC−5) as listed by CONCACAF (local times, if different, are in parentheses).

14 November 2024
21:00 (20:00 UTC−6)

Costa Rica	0–1	Panama
	Report	Fajardo 66' (pen.)

Estadio Nacional, San José
Attendance: 29,201
Referee: Saíd Martínez (Honduras)
18 November 2024
21:00

Panama	2–2	Costa Rica
Blackman 14'; J. Rodríguez 45+3'	Report	Bran 24'; Martínez 73'

Estadio Rommel Fernández, Panama City
Attendance: 21,249
Referee: César Ramos (Mexico)

Panama won 3–2 on aggregate, advanced to the Finals and qualified for the 2025 CONCACAF Gold Cup. Costa Rica qualified for the 2025 CONCACAF Gold Cup qualification.

14 November 2024
20:00

Jamaica	0–1	United States
	Report	Pepi 5'

National Stadium, Kingston
Attendance: 20,513
Referee: Juan Gabriel Calderón (Costa Rica)
18 November 2024
20:00 (19:00 UTC−6)

United States	4–2	Jamaica
Pulisic 14'; Bernard 33' (o.g.); Pepi 42'; Weah 56'	Report	D. Gray 53', 68'

Energizer Park, St. Louis
Attendance: 21,080
Referee: Mario Escobar (Guatemala)

The United States won 5–2 on aggregate, advanced to the Finals and qualified for the 2025 CONCACAF Gold Cup. Jamaica qualified for the 2025 CONCACAF Gold Cup qualification.

15 November 2024
18:30 (20:30 UTC−3)

Suriname	0–1	Canada
	Report	Hoilett 82'

Dr. Ir. Franklin Essed Stadion, Paramaribo
Attendance: 3,500
Referee: Oshane Nation (Jamaica)
19 November 2024
19:30

Canada	3–0	Suriname
David 23'; Shaffelburg 30', 67'	Report

BMO Field, Toronto
Attendance: 13,239
Referee: Katia García (Mexico)

Canada won 4–0 on aggregate, advanced to the Finals and qualified for the 2025 CONCACAF Gold Cup. Suriname qualified for the 2025 CONCACAF Gold Cup qualification.

15 November 2024
21:00 (20:00 UTC−6)

Honduras	2–0	Mexico
Palma 64', 83'	Report

Estadio Francisco Morazán, San Pedro Sula
Attendance: 12,866
Referee: Walter López (Guatemala)
19 November 2024
21:30 (20:30 UTC−6)

Mexico	4–0	Honduras
Jiménez 42'; Martín 72', 90+7' (pen.); J. Sánchez 85'	Report

Estadio Nemesio Díez, Toluca
Attendance: 26,898
Referee: Drew Fischer (Canada)

Mexico won 4–2 on aggregate, advanced to the Finals and qualified for the 2025 CONCACAF Gold Cup. Honduras qualified for the 2025 CONCACAF Gold Cup qualification.

== Nations League Finals ==
=== Seeding ===
The four teams were ranked based on their results in the two quarter-finals legs to determine the semi-final matchups. The first seed played the fourth seed and the second seed played the third seed.

Seed	QF	Team	Pld	W	D	L	GF	GA	GD	Pts
1	QF3	Canada	2	2	0	0	4	0	+4	6
2	QF2	United States	2	2	0	0	5	2	+3	6
3	QF1	Panama	2	1	1	0	3	2	+1	4
4	QF4	Mexico	2	1	0	1	4	2	+2	3

Source: CONCACAF
Rules for classification: Tiebreakers

=== Bracket ===
Semi-finals
20 March – Inglewood
Canada	0
Mexico	2
20 March – Inglewood
United States	0
Panama	1

Final
23 March – Inglewood
Mexico	2
Panama	1
Third place play-off
23 March – Inglewood
Canada	2
United States	1

=== Semi-finals ===
20 March 2025
19:00 (16:00 UTC−7)

United States	0–1	Panama
	Report	Waterman 90+4'

SoFi Stadium, Inglewood
Referee: Oshane Nation (Jamaica)

20 March 2025
22:30 (19:30 UTC−7)

Canada	0–2	Mexico
	Report	Jiménez 1', 75'

SoFi Stadium, Inglewood
Attendance: 50,295
Referee: Saíd Martínez (Honduras)

=== Third place play-off ===
23 March 2025
18:00 (15:00 UTC−7)

Canada	2–1	United States
Oluwaseyi 27'; J. David 59'	Report	Agyemang 35'

SoFi Stadium, Inglewood
Referee: Katia García (Mexico)

=== Final ===
23 March 2025
21:30 (18:30 UTC−7)

Mexico	2–1	Panama
Jiménez 8', 90+2' (pen.)	Report	Carrasquilla 45+2' (pen.)

SoFi Stadium, Inglewood
Attendance: 68,212
Referee: Mario Escobar (Guatemala)

== Goalscorers ==
There were 93 goals scored in 36 matches, for an average of 2.58 goals per match.

5 goals

- (Mexico) Raúl Jiménez

2 goals

- (Canada) Jonathan David
- (Canada) Jacob Shaffelburg
- (Costa Rica) Francisco Calvo
- (Costa Rica) Warren Madrigal
- (French Guiana) Jules Haabo
- (Guatemala) Oscar Santis
- (Guyana) Isaiah Jones
- (Honduras) Luis Palma
- (Honduras) David Ruiz
- (Jamaica) Demarai Gray
- (Martinique) Brighton Labeau
- (Mexico) Henry Martín
- (Suriname) Sheraldo Becker
- (Suriname) Virgil Misidjan
- (Trinidad and Tobago) Joevin Jones
- (United States) Ricardo Pepi

1 goal

- (Canada) Junior Hoilett
- (Canada) Tani Oluwaseyi
- (Costa Rica) Josimar Alcócer
- (Costa Rica) Alejandro Bran
- (Costa Rica) Ariel Lassiter
- (Costa Rica) Alonso Martínez
- (Costa Rica) Kenneth Vargas
- (Cuba) Aniel Casanova
- (Cuba) Karel Espino
- (Cuba) Yasnier Matos
- (Cuba) Rey Ángel Rodríguez
- (Guadeloupe) Jordan Leborgne
- (Guatemala) Óscar Castellanos
- (Guatemala) José Carlos Martínez
- (Guatemala) José Carlos Pinto
- (Guatemala) Rubio Rubín
- (French Guiana) Ludovic Baal
- (French Guiana) Raphaël Galas
- (Guyana) Stephen Duke-McKenna
- (Guyana) Omari Glasgow
- (Guyana) Jalen Jones
- (Honduras) Kervin Arriaga
- (Honduras) Jorge Benguché
- (Honduras) Deybi Flores
- (Honduras) Alexander López
- (Honduras) Anthony Lozano
- (Honduras) Edwin Rodríguez
- (Jamaica) Romario Williams
- (Jamaica) Michail Antonio
- (Martinique) Kevin Appin
- (Martinique) Rudy Varane
- (Mexico) Jorge Sánchez
- (Nicaragua) Juan Barrera
- (Nicaragua) Marvin Fletes
- (Nicaragua) Harold Medina
- (Nicaragua) Jaime Moreno
- (Nicaragua) Widman Talavera
- (Panama) César Blackman
- (Panama) Adalberto Carrasquilla
- (Panama) José Fajardo
- (Panama) José Rodríguez
- (Panama) Cecilio Waterman
- (Suriname) Djevencio van der Kust
- (Suriname) Ridgeciano Haps
- (Suriname) Denzel Jubitana
- (Suriname) Jaden Montnor
- (Suriname) Gleofilo Vlijter
- (Trinidad and Tobago) Sheldon Bateau
- (Trinidad and Tobago) Dantaye Gilbert
- (Trinidad and Tobago) Real Gill
- (United States) Patrick Agyemang
- (United States) Christian Pulisic
- (United States) Tim Weah

1 own goal

- (Honduras) Denil Maldonado (against Jamaica)
- (Jamaica) Di'Shon Bernard (against United States)
- (Nicaragua) Josué Quijano (against Jamaica)
