= Brandon Adderley =

Bahamian footballer

Personal information
- Full name: Brandon John Adderley
- Date of birth: 2 January 2002 (age 24)
- Place of birth: Nassau, Bahamas
- Height: 1.80 m (5 ft 11 in)
- Position: Striker

Team information
- Current team: Dynamos
- Number: 9

Youth career
- –2019: Bears

Senior career*
Years	Team	Apps	(Gls)
2019–2021	Bears		
2021–	Dynamos	31	(46)
2023	→ Total90 (loan)		

International career^{‡}
2022–	Bahamas	11	(6)
- * Club domestic league appearances and goals as of 14:01, 16 October 2024 (UTC) ‡ National team caps and goals as of 14:01, 16 October 2024 (UTC)

Brandon John Adderley (born 2 January 2002) is a Bahamian footballer who plays for Dynamos FC and the Bahamas national football team.

== Club career ==
Adderley began playing football at age ten. In 2019, he played for Bears FC in the BFA Senior League. He scored a hat-trick against Renegades FC to help secure second place in the standings and a spot in the play-offs. While playing for Senior League club Dynamos in 2023, Adderley traveled to the United States for professional tryouts. During that time, he participated in the spring season of the UPSL Premier Division with the Total90 Futbol Academy in Tulsa, Oklahoma. He finished the season as the highest scorer in the Central Division with twenty goals in ten matches.

== International career ==
Adderley made his senior international debut on 26 March 2022 in a friendly against Saint Martin. After failing to score in his first six senior matches, he scored five times in his first three appearances in the 2024–25 CONCACAF Nations League C. Because of his three goals in two matches in September 2024, Adderley was named to the CONCACAF Nations League C Best XI for the match window.

=== International goals ===
Scores and results list the Bahamas' goal tally first.

No.	Date	Venue	Opponent	Score	Result	Competition
1.	4 September 2024	Bethlehem Soccer Stadium, Upper Bethlehem, United States Virgin Islands	U.S. Virgin Islands	3–1	3–3	2024–25 CONCACAF Nations League C
2.	7 September 2024	Bethlehem Soccer Stadium, Upper Bethlehem, United States Virgin Islands	Barbados	1–1	2–3	2024–25 CONCACAF Nations League C
3.	7 September 2024	Bethlehem Soccer Stadium, Upper Bethlehem, United States Virgin Islands	Barbados	2–1	2–3	2024–25 CONCACAF Nations League C
4.	12 October 2024	Wildey Turf, Wildey, Barbados	U.S. Virgin Islands	1–0	3–1	2024–25 CONCACAF Nations League C
5.	12 October 2024	Wildey Turf, Wildey, Barbados	U.S. Virgin Islands	2–0	3–1	2024–25 CONCACAF Nations League C
6.	15 October 2024	Wildey Turf, Wildey, Barbados	Barbados	1–0	2–6	2024–25 CONCACAF Nations League C
Last updated 16 October 2024

=== International career statistics ===
As of match played 15 October 2024

National team	Year	Apps	Goals
Bahamas
Bahamas	2022	2	0
Bahamas	2023	3	0
Bahamas	2024	6	6
Total		11	6

== Beach soccer ==
Adderley is also a member of Bahamas national beach soccer team. His first international tournament was the 2022 Bahamas Beach Soccer Cup. The Bahamas defeated Colombia in the final to win the trophy.
