= Isaiah Lee =

Caymanian footballer, forward

Personal information
- Date of birth: 21 September 1999 (age 27)
- Place of birth: Valencia, Trinidad and Tobago
- Height: 1.83 m (6 ft 0 in)
- Position: Forward

Team information
- Current team: Central

College career
Years	Team	Apps	(Gls)
2018	Monroe Mustangs	11	(19)

Senior career*
Years	Team	Apps	(Gls)
2018	Matura ReUnited	8	(6)
2019–2025	La Horquetta Rangers		(30+)
2025–	Central		

International career^{‡}
2018	Trinidad and Tobago U20	7	(4)
2018–	Trinidad and Tobago	16	(3)
- * Club domestic league appearances and goals as of 18:04, 29 July 2020 (UTC) ‡ National team caps and goals as of 18:04, 25 March 2025 (UTC)

Isaiah Lee (born 21 September 1999) is a Trinidadian footballer who plays as a forward for TT Premier Football League club Central and the Trinidad and Tobago national team.

== Club career ==
=== Collegiate soccer ===
Having enrolled at the Monroe College in August 2018, Lee would feature prominently for the college's soccer team, the Monroe Mustangs, scoring nineteen goals in eleven appearances.

== International career ==
Lee starred for Trinidad and Tobago at the 2018 CONCACAF U-20 Championship, scoring four goals as his side were eliminated in the group stage. These performances earned him a call-up to the full national team squad in November 2018. He made his debut in a 1–0 friendly loss to Iran on 15 November.

He scored his first goal for Trinidad and Tobago in 2025 CONCACAF Gold Cup qualification on 21 March 2025; the equaliser in an eventual 2–1 win against Cuba.

== Personal life ==
Lee was educated at the Naparima College in San Fernando.

== Career statistics ==
=== International ===
As of 30 May 2026.

National team	Year	Apps	Goals
Trinidad and Tobago	2018	1	0
Trinidad and Tobago	2019	1	0
Trinidad and Tobago	2020	0	0
Trinidad and Tobago	2021	2	0
Trinidad and Tobago	2022	0	0
Trinidad and Tobago	2023	0	0
Trinidad and Tobago	2024	3	0
Trinidad and Tobago	2025	6	3
Trinidad and Tobago	2026	1	0
Total		17	3

Trinidad and Tobago score listed first, score column indicates score after each Lee goal.

List of international goals scored by Isaiah Lee
No.	Date	Venue	Cap	Opponent	Score	Result	Competition
1	21 March 2025	Estadio Antonio Maceo, Santiago, Cuba	12	Cuba	1–1	2–1	2025 CONCACAF Gold Cup qualification
2	25 March 2025	Ato Boldon Stadium, Couva, Trinidad and Tobago	13	Cuba	1–0	4–0	2025 CONCACAF Gold Cup qualification
3	25 March 2025	Ato Boldon Stadium, Couva, Trinidad and Tobago	13	Cuba	2–0	4–0	2025 CONCACAF Gold Cup qualification
