= Yasniel Matos =

Cuban footballer (born 2002)

Personal information
- Full name: Yasniel Matos Rodríguez
- Date of birth: 29 March 2002 (age 24)
- Place of birth: Holguín, Cuba
- Height: 1.74 m (5 ft 9 in)
- Position: Striker

Team information
- Current team: Marquense
- Number: 11

Youth career
- FC Holguín

Senior career*
Years	Team	Apps	(Gls)
2020–2021	FC Holguín		
2021–2024	Municipal	77	(17)
2024	→ Xelajú (loan)	11	(2)
2024–	Marquense	0	(0)

International career^{‡}
2021–	Cuba	35	(5)
- * Club domestic league appearances and goals as of 14 May 2023 ‡ National team caps and goals as of 12 June 2023

Yasniel Matos Rodríguez (born 29 March 2002) is a Cuban professional footballer who plays as a striker for Liga Guate club Municipal and the Cuba national team.

== International career ==
Matos made his debut for the Cuba national football team on 24 March 2021. On 2 November 2021, Matos was called up for two international friendlies in Nicaragua.

== Career statistics ==
National team	Year	Apps	Goals
Cuba	2021	6	0
Cuba	2022	0	0
Total		6	0

== International goals ==
No.	Date	Venue	Opponent	Score	Result	Competition
1.	26 March 2023	Estadio Antonio Maceo, Santiago de Cuba, Cuba	Guadeloupe	1–0	1–0	2022–23 CONCACAF Nations League
2.	14 October 2024	Dwight Yorke Stadium, Bacolet, Trinidad and Tobago	Trinidad and Tobago	1–2	1–3	2024–25 CONCACAF Nations League
3.	21 March 2025	Estadio Antonio Maceo, Santiago de Cuba, Cuba	Trinidad and Tobago	1–0	1–2	2025 CONCACAF Gold Cup qualification
4.	12 November 2025	Estadio Cibao FC, Santiago de los Caballeros, Dominican Republic	Saint Lucia	2–0	3–0	2025–26 CONCACAF Series
5.	15 November 2025	Estadio Cibao FC, Santiago de los Caballeros, Dominican Republic	Martinique	1–0	2–0	2025–26 CONCACAF Series
