= Carl Hinkson =

Barbadian association football player

Personal information
- Full name: Carl Hinkson
- Date of birth: 14 April 1997 (age 29)
- Place of birth: Saint George, Barbados
- Height: 1.78 m (5 ft 10 in)
- Position: Right-back

Team information
- Current team: SIUE Cougars
- Number: 5

Youth career
- 2008–2015: Barbados Soccer Academy

College career
Years	Team	Apps	(Gls)
2015–2019	SIUE Cougars	44	(0)

International career^{‡}
2013	Barbados U17	4	(0)
2018–	Barbados	24	(1)
- ‡ National team caps and goals as of 23:55, 16 June 2026 (UTC)

Carl Hinkson (born 14 April 1997) is a Barbadian footballer who plays as a right-back for the SIUE Cougars.

== College career ==
Played for SIUE Cougars from 2015 to 2019.

== International career ==
Hinkson represented the Barbados U17s at the 2013 CONCACAF U-17 Championship. Hinkson made his debut for the Barbados national football team in a 0–0 friendly tie with Bermuda on 26 March 2018.

=== International goals ===
Scores and results list Barbados's goal tally first.

No.	Date	Venue	Opponent	Score	Result	Competition
1.	10 September 2024	Bethlehem Soccer Stadium, Upper Bethlehem, U.S. Virgin Islands	U.S. Virgin Islands	1–0	3–0	2024–25 CONCACAF Nations League C
