= Jalen Jones (footballer) =

Footballer (born 1998)

Personal information
- Full name: Jalen Anthony Jones
- Date of birth: 13 November 1998 (age 28)
- Place of birth: Tooting, England
- Height: 1.95 m (6 ft 5 in)
- Position: Defender

Team information
- Current team: Dover Athletic

Youth career
- Tooting & Mitcham United
- AFC Wimbledon
- –2017: Crystal Palace
- 2017: Abbey Rangers

Senior career*
Years	Team	Apps	(Gls)
2017–2018	Merstham	7	(0)
2018	Eastbourne United		
2018–2019	Worthing	31	(5)
2019–2020	Merstham	3	(0)
2020–2021	Skellefteå FF	13	(1)
2021–2022	Carshalton Athletic	14	(2)
2022	Cheshunt	3	(0)
2022	Braintree Town	5	(0)
2022	→ Biggleswade Town (dual-reg.)	3	(1)
2022–2023	Cray Wanderers	40	(4)
2023–2024	Aveley	39	(1)
2024–2025	Oxford City	34	(3)
2025–	Dover Athletic	0	(0)

International career^{‡}
2022–	Guyana	10	(0)
- * Club domestic league appearances and goals as of 20:45, 19 July 2025 (UTC) ‡ National team caps and goals as of 14:29, 14 January 2024 (UTC)

Jalen Jones (born 13 November 1998) is a footballer who plays as a defender for Dover Athletic. Born in England, he is a Guyana international.

== Career ==
Before the second half of 2018–19, he signed for English seventh tier side Worthing. In 2020, Jones signed for Skellefteå in the Swedish fourth tier. In 2021, he signed for English seventh tier club Carshalton Athletic. In 2022, he signed for Braintree Town in the English sixth tier.

After spending the 2022–23 season at Cray Wanderers, Jones made the switch to newly promoted National League South club, Aveley in July 2023.

In July 2024, Jones joined National League North side Oxford City.

On 19 July 2025, Jones joined newly promoted National League South side Dover Athletic.

== Career statistics ==
As of end of 2023–24 season

Appearances and goals by club, season and competition
Club	Season	League			FA Cup		EFL Cup		Other		Total	
Club	Season	Division	Apps	Goals	Apps	Goals	Apps	Goals	Apps	Goals	Apps	Goals
Merstham	2017–18	Isthmian League Premier Division	7	0	0	0	—		2 (Note: Appearances in the FA Trophy)	0	9	0
Eastbourne United	2018–19	Southern Combination League Premier Division	No data currently available									
Worthing	2018–19	Isthmian League Premier Division	22	5	—		—		—		22	5
Worthing	2019–20	Isthmian League Premier Division	9	0	4	1	—		0	0	13	1
Worthing	Total		31	5	4	1	—		0	0	35	6
Merstham	2019–20	Isthmian League Premier Division	3	0	—		—		1 (Note: Appearance in the Alan Turvey Trophy)	0	4	0
Skellefteå FF	2020	Division 2 Norrland	No data currently available									
Carshalton Athletic	2021–22	Isthmian League Premier Division	14	2	2	0	—		2	0	18	2
Cheshunt	2021–22	Isthmian League Premier Division	3	0	—		—		—		3	0
Braintree Town	2021–22	National League South	5	0	—		—		—		5	0
Biggleswade Town (dual-reg.)	2021–22	Southern League Premier Division Central	3	1	—		—		—		3	1
Cray Wanderers	2022–23	Isthmian League Premier Division	40	4	2	0	—		4 (Note: Appearances in FA Trophy, London Senior Cup and Isthmian League Premier Division play-offs)	0	46	4
Aveley	2023–24	National League South	38	1	4	1	—		4 (Note: Three appearances in FA Trophy, one appearance in National League South play-offs)	0	46	2
Career total			144	13	12	2	0	0	13	0	169	15
