= Niall Reid-Stephen =

Barbadian footballer (born 2001)

Personal information
- Date of birth: 8 September 2001 (age 25)
- Place of birth: Bridgetown, Barbados
- Height: 1.83 m (6 ft 0 in)
- Position: Winger

Team information
- Current team: New Mexico United
- Number: 7

Youth career
- 2016–2018: Pro Shottas

College career
Years	Team	Apps	(Gls)
2021–2022	Chicago State Cougars	15	(4)
2023	Florida Gulf Coast Eagles	12	(1)

Senior career*
Years	Team	Apps	(Gls)
2018–2021	UWI Blackbirds		
2024	Appalachian FC	10	(9)
2024	Asheville City	4	(0)
2025	Tormenta FC	27	(13)
2026–	New Mexico United	24	(6)

International career^{‡}
2018–	Barbados	25	(14)
- * Club domestic league appearances and goals as of 10:00, 10 November 2026 (UTC) ‡ National team caps and goals as of 03:17, 3 October 2026 (UTC)

Niall Reid-Stephen (born 8 September 2001) is a Barbadian international footballer who plays for USL Championship club New Mexico United, and for the Barbadian national team.

== Club career ==
Domestically, Reid-Stephen played for UWI Blackbirds in the Barbados Premier League. In March 2021, it was announced that he had committed to playing college soccer in the United States for the Cougars of Chicago State University. After two seasons, Reid-Stephen transferred to join the Florida Gulf Coast Eagles.

In 2024, Reid-Stephen joined Appalachian FC of the National Premier Soccer League. That season, he scored two goals against Charlottetowne Hops FC in the semi-finals to secure the victory and advance to the conference championship match. A week later, Reid-Stephen moved to Asheville City SC of USL League Two. He debuted for the club in the conference quarter-final match against NONA FC. Asheville City won the match 4–0.

Reid-Stephen signed with professional USL League One club Tormenta FC on 9 January 2025. During the 2025 season, he tallied thirteen goals and seven assists to lead the league in goal contributions during the regular season. Following the season, he was named to the 2025 USL League One All-Team for his performance.

On January 1, 2026, USL Championship side New Mexico United announced they had acquired Reid-Stephen via transfer from Tormenta FC for an undisclosed fee. The transfer fee was joint-highest ever paid by a USL Championship Club to one in USL League One.

== International career ==
Reid-Stephen made his senior international debut on 30 September 2018 in a friendly against Saint Vincent and the Grenadines.

=== International goals ===
Scores and results list Barbados's goal tally first.

No.	Date	Venue	Opponent	Score	Result	Competition
1.	4 June 2021	Félix Sánchez Olympic Stadium, Santo Domingo, Dominican Republic	Dominican Republic	1–0	1–1	2022 FIFA World Cup qualification
2.	5 June 2024	Ergilio Hato Stadium, Willemstad, Curaçao	Curaçao	1–3	1–4	2026 FIFA World Cup qualification
3.	9 June 2024	Wildey Turf, Wildey, Barbados	Haiti	1–2	1–3	2026 FIFA World Cup qualification
4.	10 September 2024	Bethlehem Soccer Stadium, Upper Bethlehem, United States Virgin Islands	U.S. Virgin Islands	2–0	3–0	2024–25 CONCACAF Nations League C
5.	10 September 2024	Bethlehem Soccer Stadium, Upper Bethlehem, United States Virgin Islands	U.S. Virgin Islands	3–0	3–0	2024–25 CONCACAF Nations League C
6.	9 October 2024	Wildey Turf, Wildey, Barbados	U.S. Virgin Islands	2–0	4–0	2024–25 CONCACAF Nations League C
7.	9 October 2024	Wildey Turf, Wildey, Barbados	U.S. Virgin Islands	3–0	4–0	2024–25 CONCACAF Nations League C
8.	9 October 2024	Wildey Turf, Wildey, Barbados	U.S. Virgin Islands	4–0	4–0	2024–25 CONCACAF Nations League C
9.	15 October 2024	Wildey Turf, Wildey, Barbados	Bahamas	2–1	6–2	2024–25 CONCACAF Nations League C
10.	15 November 2024	Wildey Turf, Wildey, Barbados	Guyana	1–1	1–4	2024–25 CONCACAF Nations League C
11.	19 November 2024	Synthetic Track and Field Facility, Leonora, Guyana	Guyana	3–4	3–5	2024–25 CONCACAF Nations League C
12.	25 September 2026	Daren Sammy Cricket Ground, Gros Islet, Saint Lucia	Saint Lucia	2–0	2–0	2026–27 CONCACAF Nations League B
13.	28 September 2026	Daren Sammy Cricket Ground, Gros Islet, Saint Lucia	Guadeloupe	2–1	2–2	2026–27 CONCACAF Nations League B
14.	2 October 2026	Wildey Turf, Wildey, Barbados	Bermuda	4–1	4–1	2026–27 CONCACAF Nations League B
Last updated 2 October 2026

=== International career statistics ===
As of matches played 2 October 2026

National team	Year	Apps	Goals
Barbados	2018	1	0
Barbados	2019	1	0
Barbados	2021	4	1
Barbados	2022	4	0
Barbados	2023	2	0
Barbados	2024	8	10
Barbados	2025	2	0
Barbados	2026	3	3
Total		25	14
