= 2025 CONCACAF Gold Cup qualification =

2025 CONCACAF Gold Cup Prelims
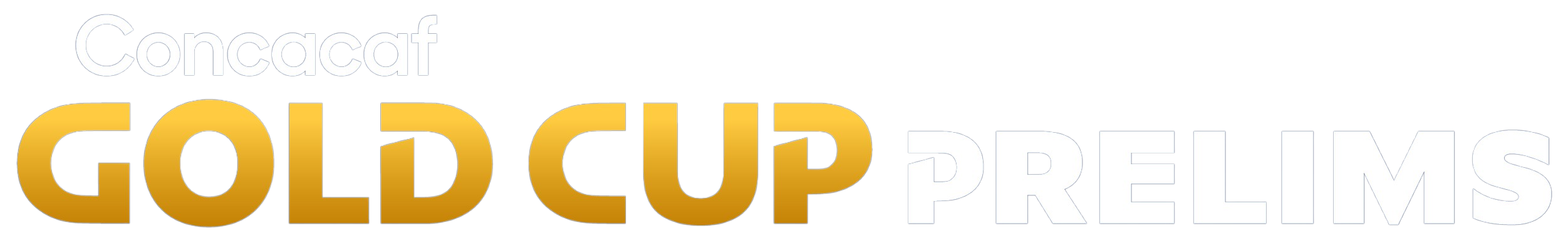

Tournament details
- Dates: 21–25 March
- Teams: 14

Tournament statistics
- Matches played: 14
- Goals scored: 47 (3.36 per match)
- Top scorer(s): (Costa Rica) Manfred Ugalde (Costa Rica) Álvaro Zamora (Guyana) Isaiah Jones (Trinidad and Tobago) Isaiah Lee (3 goals each)

The 2025 CONCACAF Gold Cup qualification or 2025 Gold Cup Prelims was the tournament that determined the final seven teams to qualify for the 2025 CONCACAF Gold Cup.

The matches took place from 21 to 25 March 2025.

== Format ==
Unlike the previous Gold Cup Prelims, this edition consisted of a single round in which the 14 involved teams were divided into 7 ties.

The ties were played on a home-and-away two-legged basis, with the highest-ranked team in each tie hosting the second leg. If the aggregate score is level at the end of the second leg the away goals rule would be applied (e.g. the team that scores more goals away from home advanced to the final tournament). If away goals were also equal, then 30 minutes of extra time would be played without taking into account the away goals rule during this time. If still tied after extra time, the tie would be decided by a penalty shoot-out.

The winners qualified for the 2025 CONCACAF Gold Cup.

== Teams ==
Fourteen teams qualified for the 2025 Gold Cup Prelims through their participation in the 2024–25 CONCACAF Nations League. From Nations League A, the four quarter-final losers as well as the third and fourth-placed teams in both Group A and Group B qualified. From Nations League B, the top-two second-place finishers qualified. The final four spots in the qualification tournament went to the winners of the Nations League Play-in between the top-four teams in Nation League C and the fifth and sixth-placed teams of each group from League A.

The following 14 teams qualified:

League A (QF losers)
QF	Team
QF1	Costa Rica
QF2	Jamaica
QF3	Suriname
QF4	Honduras

League A (3rd and 4th places)
Group	Team
A	Guatemala
B	Nicaragua
A	Martinique
B	Trinidad and Tobago

League B (top-2 second places)
Group	Team
A	Saint Vincent and the Grenadines
D	Bermuda

Play-in winners
PI	Team
PI1	Guadeloupe
PI2	Cuba
PI3	Belize
PI4	Guyana

=== Seeding ===
In order to determine the 7 matchups, the teams were seeded 1–14 based on the CONCACAF Rankings as of 20 November 2024, with the 7 highest-ranked teams facing the 7 lowest-ranked teams (1 v 14, 2 v 13, 3 v 12, 4 v 11, 5 v 10, 6 v 9 and 7 v 8).

Seed	Team	Rank	Points
1	Costa Rica	5	1,658
2	Jamaica	6	1,574
3	Honduras	7	1,513
4	Guatemala	9	1,423
5	Trinidad and Tobago	10	1,313
6	Martinique	11	1,296
7	Nicaragua	13	1,198
8	Guadeloupe	14	1,139
9	Suriname	16	1,128
10	Cuba	17	1,112
11	Guyana	19	1,024
12	Bermuda	21	885
13	Saint Vincent and the Grenadines	22	870
14	Belize	25	791

== Summary ==
The two legs were played on March 21 and 25, 2025.

Team 1	Agg.	Team 2	1st leg	2nd leg
Belize	1–13	Costa Rica	0–7	1–6
Saint Vincent and the Grenadines	1–4	Jamaica	1–1	0–3
Bermuda	3–7	Honduras	3–5	0–2
Guyana	3–4	Guatemala	3–2	0–2
Cuba	1–6	Trinidad and Tobago	1–2	0–4
Suriname	2–0	Martinique	1–0	1–0
Guadeloupe	2–0	Nicaragua	1–0	1–0

== Matches ==
The fixture list and matchups were confirmed on 20 November 2024. All match times are in EDT (UTC−4) (local times, if different, are in parentheses).

21 March 2025
22:00 (20:00 UTC−6)

Belize	0–7	Costa Rica
	Report	Ugalde 7', 36' (pen.); K. Vargas 38'; Mitchell 65'; Zamora 70', 88'; Alcócer 81'

FFB Stadium, Belmopan
Referee: Adonis Carrasco (Dominican Republic)
25 March 2025
21:00 (19:00 UTC−6)

Costa Rica	6–1	Belize
Arzu 1' (o.g.); Bran 6', 66'; Martínez 8'; Ugalde 36'; Zamora 69'	Report	Bernárdez 47'

Estadio Nacional, San José
Attendance: 11,877
Referee: Julio Luna (Guatemala)

Costa Rica won 13–1 on aggregate and qualified for the 2025 CONCACAF Gold Cup.

21 March 2025
19:00

Saint Vincent and the Grenadines	1–1	Jamaica
Anderson 65'	Report	Bailey 90+4' (pen.)

Arnos Vale Stadium, Kingstown
Attendance: 8,250
Referee: Karen Hernández (Mexico)
25 March 2025
20:00 (19:00 UTC−5)

Jamaica	3–0	Saint Vincent and the Grenadines
Brown 27'; Johnson 89' (o.g.); Cephas 90+4'	Report

Sabina Park, Kingston
Attendance: 6,500
Referee: Pierre-Luc Lauzière (Canada)

Jamaica won 4–1 on aggregate and qualified for the 2025 CONCACAF Gold Cup.

21 March 2025
19:00 (20:00 UTC−3)

Bermuda	3–5	Honduras
Crichlow 1'; Parfitt 44'; Lewis 90+2' (pen.)	Report	Quioto 60', 66'; Palma 64'; Martínez 89'; Pinto 90+4'

Bermuda National Stadium, Devonshire
Attendance: 545
Referee: Reon Radix (Grenada)
25 March 2025
22:00 (20:00 UTC−6)

Honduras	2–0	Bermuda
Benguché 53'; Palma 57'	Report

Estadio Nacional Chelato Uclés, Tegucigalpa
Attendance: 0 (Note: Honduras played their home match behind closed doors as they were punished for the incidents in their match against Mexico on 15 November 2024 valid for the quarter-finals of the 2024–25 CONCACAF Nations League A.)
Referee: Bryan López (Guatemala)

Honduras won 7–3 on aggregate and qualified for the 2025 CONCACAF Gold Cup.

21 March 2025
21:00

Guyana	3–2	Guatemala
I. Jones 9', 36', 56'	Report	Martínez 29'; Pinto 80' (pen.)

BFA Technical Centre, Bridgetown (Barbados) (Note: Guyana will play their home match at the BFA Technical Centre in Bridgetown (Barbados) instead of their regular home stadium Synthetic Track and Field Facility, Leonora due to logistical challenges and playing conditions.)
Attendance: 136
Referee: Iván Barton (El Salvador)
25 March 2025
20:30 (18:30 UTC−6)

Guatemala	2–0	Guyana
Rubin 11'; Lemus 76'	Report

Estadio Cementos Progreso, Guatemala City
Attendance: 7,200
Referee: Lukasz Szpala (United States)

Guatemala won 4–3 on aggregate and qualified for the 2025 CONCACAF Gold Cup.

21 March 2025
16:00

Cuba	1–2	Trinidad and Tobago
Matos 6'	Report	Lee 20'; Yeates 53'

Estadio Antonio Maceo, Santiago de Cuba
Attendance: 3,500
Referee: Juan Gabriel Calderón (Costa Rica)
25 March 2025
19:00

Trinidad and Tobago	4–0	Cuba
Lee 22', 37'; Molino 51'; James 84'	Report

Ato Boldon Stadium, Couva
Attendance: 6,241
Referee: César Arturo Ramos (Mexico)

Trinidad and Tobago won 6–1 on aggregate and qualified for the 2025 CONCACAF Gold Cup.

21 March 2025
18:00 (19:00 UTC−3)

Suriname	1–0	Martinique
Kerk 52'	Report

Dr. Ir. Franklin Essed Stadion, Paramaribo
Attendance: 2,748
Referee: Víctor Cáceres (Mexico)
25 March 2025
19:00

Martinique	0–1	Suriname
	Report	Pherai 80'

Stade Pierre-Aliker, Fort-de-France
Attendance: 2,000
Referee: José Torres (Puerto Rico)

Suriname won 2–0 on aggregate and qualified for the 2025 CONCACAF Gold Cup.

21 March 2025
20:00

Guadeloupe	1–0	Nicaragua
David 17'	Report

Stade Roger Zami, Le Grosier
Attendance: 1,351
Referee: Nelson Salgado (Honduras)
25 March 2025
20:30 (18:30 UTC−6)

Nicaragua	0–1	Guadeloupe
	Report	Mirval 64'

Estadio Nacional de Fútbol, Managua
Attendance: 15,630
Referee: Fernando Hernández (Mexico)

Guadeloupe won 2–0 on aggregate and qualified for the 2025 CONCACAF Gold Cup.

== Qualified teams ==
Team	Qualified as	Qualified on	Previous appearances in CONCACAF Gold Cup^{1} only Gold Cup era (since 1991)
Haiti	CNL League B Group C 1st place	15 November 2024	9 (2000, 2002, 2007, 2009, 2013, 2015, 2019, 2021, 2023)
El Salvador	CNL League B Group A 1st place	17 November 2024	13 (1996, 1998, 2002, 2003, 2007, 2009, 2011, 2013, 2015, 2017, 2019, 2021, 2023)
Curaçao	CNL League B Group B 1st place	18 November 2024	2 (2017, 2019)
United States	CNL League A quarterfinal winner	18 November 2024	17 (**1991**, 1993, 1996, 1998, 2000, **2002**, 2003, **2005**, **2007**, 2009, 2011, **2013**, 2015, **2017**, 2019, **2021**, 2023)
Panama	CNL League A quarterfinal winner	18 November 2024	11 (1993, 2005, 2007, 2009, 2011, 2013, 2015, 2017, 2019, 2021, 2023)
Dominican Republic	CNL League B Group D 1st place	19 November 2024	0 (debut)
Canada	CNL League A quarterfinal winner	19 November 2024	16 (1991, 1993, 1996, **2000**, 2002, 2003, 2005, 2007, 2009, 2011, 2013, 2015, 2017, 2019, 2021, 2023)
Mexico	CNL League A quarterfinal winner	19 November 2024	17 (1991, **1993**, **1996**, **1998**, 2000, 2002, **2003**, 2005, 2007, **2009**, **2011**, 2013, **2015**, 2017, **2019**, 2021, **2023**)
Saudi Arabia	Invitees	19 December 2024	0 (debut)
Trinidad and Tobago	Gold Cup Prelims Winner Matchup 5	25 March 2025	12 (1991, 1996, 1998, 2000, 2002, 2005, 2007, 2013, 2015, 2019, 2021, 2023)
Suriname	Gold Cup Prelims Winner Matchup 6	25 March 2025	1 (2021)
Jamaica	Gold Cup Prelims Winner Matchup 2	25 March 2025	13 (1991, 1993, 1998, 2000, 2003, 2005, 2009, 2011, 2015, 2017, 2019, 2021, 2023)
Guadeloupe	Gold Cup Prelims Winner Matchup 7	25 March 2025	5 (2007, 2009, 2011, 2021, 2023)
Guatemala	Gold Cup Prelims Winner Matchup 4	25 March 2025	12 (1991, 1996, 1998, 2000, 2002, 2003, 2005, 2007, 2011, 2015, 2021, 2023)
Costa Rica	Gold Cup Prelims Winner Matchup 1	25 March 2025	16 (1991, 1993, 1998, 2000, 2002, 2003, 2005, 2007, 2009, 2011, 2013, 2015, 2017, 2019, 2021, 2023)
Honduras	Gold Cup Prelims Winner Matchup 3	25 March 2025	16 (1991, 1993, 1996, 1998, 2000, 2003, 2005, 2007, 2009, 2011, 2013, 2015, 2017, 2019, 2021, 2023)

^{1} Bold indicates champions for that year. Italic indicates hosts for that year.

== Goalscorers ==
There were 47 goals scored in 14 matches, for an average of 3.36 goals per match.

3 goals

- (Costa Rica) Manfred Ugalde
- (Costa Rica) Álvaro Zamora
- (Guyana) Isaiah Jones
- (Trinidad and Tobago) Isaiah Lee

2 goals

- (Costa Rica) Alejandro Bran
- (Honduras) Luis Palma
- (Honduras) Romell Quioto

1 goal

- (Belize) Carlos Bernárdez
- (Bermuda) Kane Crichlow
- (Bermuda) Zeiko Lewis
- (Bermuda) Djair Parfitt
- (Costa Rica) Josimar Alcócer
- (Costa Rica) Alonso Martínez
- (Costa Rica) Jeyland Mitchell
- (Costa Rica) Kenneth Vargas
- (Cuba) Yasniel Matos
- (Guadeloupe) Florian David
- (Guadeloupe) Raphaël Mirval
- (Guatemala) Erick Lemus
- (Guatemala) José Carlos Martínez
- (Guatemala) José Carlos Pinto
- (Guatemala) Rubio Rubin
- (Honduras) Jorge Benguché
- (Honduras) Julián Martínez
- (Honduras) José Pinto
- (Jamaica) Leon Bailey
- (Jamaica) Warner Brown
- (Jamaica) Renaldo Cephas
- (Saint Vincent and the Grenadines) Oalex Anderson
- (Suriname) Gyrano Kerk
- (Suriname) Immanuel Pherai
- (Trinidad and Tobago) Nathaniel James
- (Trinidad and Tobago) Kevin Molino
- (Trinidad and Tobago) Steffen Yeates

1 own goal

- (Belize) Donell Arzu (against Costa Rica)
- (Saint Vincent and the Grenadines) Andrew Johnson (against Jamaica)
