= Enoch George (footballer) =

Guyanese footballer (born 2008)

Personal information
- Date of birth: 23 May 2003 (age 23)
- Place of birth: Amsterdam, Netherlands
- Height: 1.95 m (6 ft 5 in)
- Position: Forward

Team information
- Current team: Scheveningen

Youth career
- –2018: HVV Hercules
- 2018–2022: FC Dordrecht
- 2023–2024: ADO Den Haag

Senior career*
Years	Team	Apps	(Gls)
2022–2023	Quick	33	(7)
2024–2025	Lisse	22	(4)
2025–	Scheveningen	1	(0)

International career^{‡}
2024–	Guyana	6	(1)
- * Club domestic league appearances and goals as of 18 October 2025 ‡ National team caps and goals as of 11 June 2026

Enoch George (born 23 May 2003) is a footballer who plays as a forward for Scheveningen. Born in the Netherlands, he is a Guyana international.

== Early life ==
George was born on 23 May 2003 in the Netherlands to Guyanese parents. Growing up, he was friends with Dutch footballer Emanuel Emegha.

== Club career ==
As a youth player, George joined the youth academy of now-defunct Dutch side HVV Hercules. Following his stint there, he joined the youth academy of Dutch side FC Dordrecht in 2018. Ahead of the 2022–23 season, he signed for Dutch side HV & CV Quick, where he made thirty-three league appearances and scored seven goals, before joining the youth academy of Dutch side ADO Den Haag in 2023.

One year later, he signed for Dutch side FC Lisse, where he made twenty-two league appearances and scored four goals. Subsequently, he signed for Dutch side SVV Scheveningen in 2025. On 18 October 2025, he debuted for the club during a 2–3 home loss to Groene Ster in the Derde Divisie.

== International career ==
George is a Guyana international. During June 2025, he played for the Guyana national football team for 2026 FIFA World Cup qualification.
