= Nicoli Brathwaite =

Barbadian footballer

Personal information
- Full name: Nicoli Davion Malyk Brathwaite
- Date of birth: 24 December 2000 (age 25)
- Place of birth: Bridgetown, Barbados
- Height: 1.79 m (5 ft 10 in)
- Position: Midfielder

Team information
- Current team: Progresul Ezeriș

Youth career
- 2009–2016: Kickstart
- 2016–2018: Leyton Orient

Senior career*
Years	Team	Apps	(Gls)
2019–2023	Paradise FC		
2023–	Progresul Ezeriș		

International career^{‡}
2018–	Barbados	26	(0)
- * Club domestic league appearances and goals as of 19:43, 16 June 2026 (UTC) ‡ National team caps and goals as of 19:43, 13 March 2023 (UTC)

Nicoli Davion Malyk Brathwaite (born 24 December 2000) is a Barbadian footballer who plays as a midfielder for ACS Progresul Ezeriș of Romania's Liga III, and the Barbados national team.

== Club career ==
Originally a cricketer, Brathwaite began playing football for Kickstart FC at the under-11 level and remained with the club through under-17. In 2016 he traveled to England on a one-year deal with Leyton Orient. After the one year, he was offered a professional contract but it did not materialize because of visa issues. He was originally spotted by the club in Barbados during a showcase jointly organized by the Barbados Football Association and Crystal Palace.

He returned to Barbados and applied for a student visa before returning to England for a two-year sports science programme the following year. While studying, he returned to Leyton Orient, practicing with the under-18 and reserve sides. After his visa was denied again, Brathwaite had a stint with the under-18 and under-23 sides of Charlton Athletic of League One. Again visa issues prevented him from signing a professional contract. Following his exit from Charlton Athletic, he went on trial with Southend United. However, his age and ongoing visa issues prevented his signing for a third time.

In July 2019 Brathwaite was selected to travel to Argentina for a residency with Club Atlético Lanús of the Primera División. Ultimately, the trial was unsuccessful because of his age. He was the first player to participate in the program which resulted from a memorandum of understanding between the University of the West Indies and the governments of Argentina and Barbados. Upon returning to Barbados, Brathwaite joined Paradise FC of the Barbados Premier League. He remained with the club through the 2022 season.

Brathwaite signed for ACS Progresul Ezeriș of Romania's Liga III in February 2023. He was one of a number of additions to the club as it tried to avoid relegation. Another player signed at the time was Loïck Piquionne, son of former French international Frédéric Piquionne. His deal in Romania was Brathwaite's first professional contract.

== International career ==
Brathwaite made his senior international debut on 29 August 2019 in a friendly against Cuba.

=== International career statistics ===
As of match played 9 June 2022.

Barbados national team
Year	Apps	Goals
2018	1	0
2019	2	0
2020	2	0
2021	0	0
2022	8	0
2023	0	0
Total	13	0
