= Wildey Turf =

Football stadium in Wildey, Barbados

- Interactive map of Wildey Turf
- Coordinates: 13.0915979°N 59.5730353°W
- Capacity: 2,000

Tenants
- Weymouth Wales FC; Barbados national football team

Website
- barbadosfa.com

Wildey Turf is a football stadium at the Sir Garfield Sobers Sports Complex, Wildey, Barbados.

It is used by the Barbados Football Association for national team and club matches.

In 2014, FIFA provided finances for an administrative building and grand stand. Artificial turf was later installed.

The venue hosted its first senior international match, against Belize on 4 June 2018.
