= Wildey, Barbados =

Coordinates: 13°06′N 59°34′W

The Wildey area of the Parish of Saint Michael located roughly 4 km east of Bridgetown, it lies on the border with the Parish of Christ Church. Normally a very busy area with the ABC Highway, Wildey is one of the main convergence points for vehicles travelling either towards the capital-city Bridgetown or towards points in northern Barbados. In recent years the area was reconfigured for traffic mitigation, the tri-directional split or fork in the highway formerly known as the "Wildey Y" was changed to only allow southbound traffic to turn left or right on to Wildey Road only. Northbound traffic must now travel on Wildey Road to Highway R road which brings traffic back to BET hill.

Buildings found in the immediate vicinity of Wildey include:

- The Barbados National Trust.
- The Wildey Gymnasium and Aquatic Centre (at The Sir Gary Sobers Sports Complex).
- The regional office for LIME (Formerly both the Barbados Telephone (BarTel) and Barbados External Telephone (BET) buildings.)
- The Sagicor Corporation (Formerly the Life of Barbados Insurance Company building)
- The Embassy of the United States of America (Covering Barbados and the Eastern Caribbean.
- The mall at Wildey
- The Luther Thorne School
- The American University of Barbados Campus
