= 2015 Barbados Premier Division =

Barbados Premier Division
- Season: 2015
- Champions: BDF
- Relegated: Pride of Gall Hill; Silver Sands
- Matches: 90
- Goals: 312 (3.47 per match)
- Top goalscorer: Dwayne Stanford (15)
- Biggest home win: Brittons Hill 9-0 Pinelands United (4 June 2015)
- Biggest away win: 2 matches: Pinelands United 0-8 Paradise (22 May 2015); Notre Dame 0-8 BDF (28 May 2015)
- Highest scoring: Brittons Hill 9-0 Pinelands United (4 June 2015)
- Longest winning run: BDF (6)
- Longest unbeaten run: Weymouth Wales (13)
- Longest winless run: Pinelands United; Silver Sands (7)
- Longest losing run: Silver Sands (7)

The 2015 Barbados Premier Division (officially the Digicel Premiere League for sponsorship reasons) was the 69th season of the highest tier of football in Barbados. Barbados Defense Force won their final six matches to hold off Rendezvous FC for their third consecutive league title and fifth overall. With BDF having already completed their schedule, Rendezvous FC needed to make up 11 goals in goal differential with a win on the final day of the season to pull even with BDF, but managed only a 2-1 victory over Weymouth Wales. The season began on February 8 and concluded on July 23.

== Changes from 2014 ==
- Cosmos and Dayrells Road FC were relegated to the Barbados First Division.
- Rendezvous FC and U.W.I. BlackBirds were promoted to the Premier Division.

== Table ==
Pos	Team	Pld	W	D	L	GF	GA	GD	Pts	Qualification or relegation
1	BDF (C)	18	12	2	4	48	15	+33	38	Qualification for 2016 CFU Club Championship
2	Rendezvous	18	12	2	4	43	20	+23	38	
3	UWI BlackBirds	18	10	4	4	38	17	+21	34	
4	Weymouth Wales	18	8	7	3	36	17	+19	31	
5	Brittons Hill	18	9	3	6	33	30	+3	30	
6	Paradise	18	7	2	9	29	31	−2	23	
7	Notre Dame	18	6	1	11	24	38	−14	19	
8	Pinelands United	18	5	3	10	27	63	−36	18	
9	Pride of Gall Hill (R)	18	4	1	13	17	34	−17	13	Relegation to 2016 Barbados First Division
10	Silver Sands (R)	18	3	3	12	17	47	−30	12	Relegation to 2016 Barbados First Division

Updated to match(es) played on 23 July 2015. Source: FIFA
Rules for classification: 1) points; 2) goal difference; 3) number of goals scored.
(C) Champions; (R) Relegated

== Results ==
Home \ Away	BDF	BRI	NOT	PAR	PIN	PGH	REN	SIL	UWI	WEY
BDF		1–2	1–2	4–0	3–1	2–0	4–3	6–0	0–2	2–2
Brittons Hill	0–1		2–1	2–0	9–0	3–2	2–1	2–0	0–2	1–1
Notre Dame	0–8	0–1		0–1	1–3	3–0	4–0	3–2	0–3	2–0
Paradise	0–5	6–0	3–1		3–2	1–2	0–0	1–0	2–3	0–4
Pinelands United	0–6	1–5	3–3	0–8		2–0	0–5	2–2	3–3	0–4
Pride of Gall Hill	0–1	4–0	2–1	0–0	1–2		2–3	1–2	0–3	0–3
Rendezvous	0–2	3–0	3–0	3–0	3–2	5–0		5–3	1–0	2–1
Silver Sands	2–0	1–1	0–2	0–4	2–4	1–0	0–4		0–3	0–3
UWI BlackBirds	1–1	4–1	5–1	2–0	0–1	0–2	0–2	4–0		1–1
Weymouth Wales	0–1	2–2	1–0	3–0	5–1	2–1	0–0	2–2	2–2	

Updated to match(es) played on 23 July 2015. Source: League&page=genz Barbados FA
Legend: Blue = home team win; Yellow = draw; Red = away team win.

== Statistics ==
=== Top Scorers ===
Rank	Scorer	Club	Goals
1	(Barbados) Dwayne Stanford	Brittons Hill	15
2	(Barbados) Romario Harewood	BDF	14
3	(Barbados) Jabarry Chandler	Paradise	12
3	(Barbados) Mario Harte	UWI BlackBirds	12
3	(Saint Vincent and the Grenadines) Myron Samuel	Rendezvous	12
6	(Barbados) Kemar Headley	Weymouth Wales	11
6	(Barbados) Arantees Lawrence	Pinelands	11
8	(Barbados) Kyle Gibson	BDF	10
8	(Saint Vincent and the Grenadines) Shandel Samuel	Rendezvous	10
10	(Barbados) Rashad Jules	BDF	7
10	(Barbados) Armando Lashley	Paradise	7

=== Hat-tricks ===
Player	Club	Against	Result	Date
(Saint Vincent and the Grenadines) Shandel Samuel	Rendezvous	Pinelands United	0—5	15 February 2015
(Barbados) Romario Harewood	BDF	Silver Sands	6—0	14 May 2015
(Barbados) Jabarry Chandler	Paradise	Pinelands United	0—8	21 May 2015
(Barbados) Armando Lashley	Paradise	Pinelands United	0—8	21 May 2015
(Barbados) Romario Harewood	BDF	Notre Dame	0—8	28 May 2015
(Barbados) Curtis Odle	Brittons Hill	Pinelands United	9—0	4 June 2015
(Barbados) Dwayne Stanford	Brittons Hill	Pinelands United	9—0	4 June 2015
(Barbados) Jabarry Chandler	Paradise	Brittons Hill	6—0	21 May 2015
