= 2016 Barbados Premier Division =

Barbados Premier Division
- Season: 2016
- Champions: UWI Blackbirds
- Relegated: Empire Club; Pinelands United
- CFU Club Championship: BDF; UWI Blackbirds
- Matches: 90
- Goals: 377 (4.19 per match)
- Top goalscorer: Mario Harte (29)
- Biggest home win: UWI Blackbirds 14-0 Rendezvous (19 June 2016)
- Biggest away win: Pinelands United 0-21 UWI Blackbirds (5 June 2016)
- Highest scoring: Pinelands United 0-21 UWI Blackbirds (5 June 2016)
- Longest winning run: BDF (7)
- Longest unbeaten run: BDF (10)
- Longest winless run: Pinelands United (18)
- Longest losing run: Pinelands United (7)
- All statistics correct as of 19 June 2016.

The 2016 Barbados Premier Division (officially the Digicel Premier League for sponsorship reasons) is the 70th season of the highest tier of football in Barbados. UWI Blackbirds won their first league title, holding off defending champions BDF by a single point. Pinelands United were winless and are joined by Empire Club in being relegated to Barbados First Division for the 2017 season.

== Changes from 2015 ==
- Pride of Gall Hill and Silver Sands were relegated to the Barbados First Division.
- Belfield and Empire Club were promoted to the Premier Division.

== Table ==
Pos	Team	Pld	W	D	L	GF	GA	GD	Pts	Qualification or relegation
1	UWI Blackbirds (C, Q)	18	15	0	3	80	19	+61	45	Qualification for 2017 CFU Club Championship
2	BDF (Q)	18	14	2	2	59	13	+46	44	Qualification for 2017 CFU Club Championship
3	Weymouth Wales	18	10	4	4	34	19	+15	34	
4	Paradise	18	10	4	4	37	25	+12	34	
5	Rendezvous	18	7	1	10	36	53	−17	22	
6	Notre Dame	18	6	3	9	27	43	−16	21	
7	Brittons Hill	18	5	5	8	25	32	−7	20	
8	Belfield	18	6	2	10	31	43	−12	20	
9	Empire Club (R)	18	4	3	11	28	45	−17	15	Relegation to 2017 Barbados First Division
10	Pinelands United (R)	18	0	2	16	20	85	−65	2	Relegation to 2017 Barbados First Division

Updated to match(es) played on 19 June 2016. Source: FIFA
Rules for classification: 1) points; 2) goal difference; 3) number of goals scored.
(C) Champions; (Q) Qualified for the phase indicated; (R) Relegated

== Results ==
Home \ Away	BDF	BEL	BRI	EMP	NOT	PAR	PIN	REN	UWI	WEY
BDF		4–1	1–0	4–1	4–0	4–0	4–0	3–0	1–2	1–1
Belfield	0–6		2–1	0–1	1–2	1–5	3–1	5–2	0–4	2–2
Brittons Hill	3–4	1–0		2–2	0–1	1–1	2–1	1–3	1–4	1–0
Empire Club	1–2	0–1	3–3		1–2	0–4	3–3	0–3	0–4	2–4
Notre Dame	1–7	1–1	0–0	3–4		2–0	1–1	5–3	2–4	1–3
Paradise	2–2	3–1	2–2	3–1	2–1		4–1	3–2	0–3	0–0
Pinelands United	0–6	2–8	0–1	1–3	2–3	1–3		2–5	0–21	0–3
Rendezvous	0–2	3–2	0–2	0–3	4–0	1–2	6–4		0–2	2–2
UWI Blackbirds	0–4	4–0	6–3	2–1	3–2	2–1	5–1	14–0		0–1
Weymouth Wales	1–0	1–3	2–1	4–2	3–0	0–2	4–0	1–2	2–0	

Updated to match(es) played on 19 June 2016. Source: League&page=genz Barbados FA
Legend: Blue = home team win; Yellow = draw; Red = away team win.

== Statistics ==
=== Top scorers ===
Rank	Scorer	Club	Goals
1	(Barbados) Mario Harte	UWI Blackbirds	29
2	(Barbados) Armando Lashley	Paradise	19
3	(Barbados) Shaquille Stewart	BDF	16
4	(Barbados) Shaquille Boyce	BDF	14
4	(Barbados) Jairo Lombardo	UWI Blackbirds	14
6	(Barbados) Kyle Gibson	Notre Dame	12
6	(Saint Vincent and the Grenadines) Shandel Samuel	Rendezvous	12
8	(Barbados) Corey Barrow	UWI Blackbirds	11
8	(Barbados) Kemar Headley	Weymouth	11
10	(Barbados) Hadan Holligan	Weymouth	9
10	(Jamaica) Omando McLeod	Empire Club	9

=== Hat-tricks ===
Player	Club	Against	Result	Date
Kemar Headley	Weymouth Wales	Pinelands United	4-0	17 January 2016
Mario Harte	UWI Blackbirds	Pinelands United	5-1	31 January 2016
Shaquille Stewart^{4}	BDF	Pinelands United	4-0	6 February 2016
Armando Lashley^{4}	Paradise	Belfield	1-5	6 February 2016
Mario Harte	UWI Blackbirds	Brittons Hill	1-4	14 February 2016
Corey Barrow	UWI Blackbirds	Belfield	4-0	20 February 2016
Dwayne Stanford	Rendezvous	Pinelands	6-4	21 February 2016
Shane Welch	Pinelands	Rendezvous	6-4	21 February 2016
Andre Leslie^{4}	UWI Blackbirds	Empire Club	4-0	12 March 2016
Shaquille Stewart	BDF	Pinelands United	0-6	12 March 2016
Jamar Grazette	Belfield	Pinelands United	2-8	28 May 2016
Henderson Richards	Belfield	Pinelands United	2-8	28 May 2016
Tristan Parris	Weymouth Wales	Empire Club	2-4	29 May 2016
Omando McLeod	Empire Club	Rendezvous	0-3	1 June 2016
Armando Lashley	Paradise	Empire Club	3-1	4 June 2016
Corey Barrow	UWI Blackbirds	Pinelands United	0-21	5 June 2016
Mario Harte^{10}	UWI Blackbirds	Pinelands United	0-21	5 June 2016
Corey Barrow	UWI Blackbirds	Rendezvous	14-0	19 June 2016
Dario Harewood	UWI Blackbirds	Rendezvous	14-0	19 June 2016
Mario Harte	UWI Blackbirds	Rendezvous	14-0	19 June 2016

^{4} Player scored 4 goals.

^{10} Player scored 10 goals.
