= 2005 Caribbean Cup squads =

The 2005 Caribbean Cup, the 13th edition of the tournament, brought together top national teams from the Caribbean to compete for regional supremacy. Held in Barbados from February 20 to February 24, 2005, the competition featured four teams in the final round—Jamaica, Cuba, Trinidad and Tobago, and Barbados—with Jamaica ultimately claiming the title after a hard-fought victory over Cuba in the final.

== Barbados ==
Head coach: (Barbados) Mark Doherty

No.	Pos.	Player	Date of birth (age)	Caps	Goals	Club
	GK	Jason Boxhill	21 May 1983 (aged 21)	4	0	(Barbados Football Association) Paradise
	GK	Bernard Howell	21 May 1983 (aged 21)	5	0	(Barbados Football Association) Saint John's Sonnets
	DF	John Parris	26 April 1974 (aged 30)	28	1	(Barbados Football Association) Notre Dame
	DF	Wayne Sobers	29 April 1971 (aged 33)	25	1	(Barbados Football Association) Notre Dame
	DF	Gregory Goodridge	10 July 1971 (aged 33)	41	13	(Barbados Football Association) Ellerton United
	DF	Dyson James	17 November 1978 (aged 26)	5	1	(Barbados Football Association) Notre Dame
	DF	Sheridan Grosvenor	27 July 1978 (aged 26)	13	0	(Barbados Football Association) Notre Dame
	DF	Elvis Defreitas	20 January 1981 (aged 24)	3	0	(Barbados Football Association) Paradise
	DF	Romell Brathwaite	18 March 1982 (aged 22)	7	0	(Barbados Football Association) Notre Dame
	MF	Norman Forde	30 April 1977 (aged 27)	27	5	(Barbados Football Association) Youth Milan
	MF	Kent Hall	20 August 1978 (aged 26)	14	0	(Barbados Football Association) Paradise
	MF	Kirk Cox	31 August 1977 (aged 27)	15	2	(Barbados Football Association) Notre Dame
	MF	Paul Lovell	2 March 1977 (aged 27)	12	2	(Barbados Football Association) Silver Sands
	MF	Rondelle Vaughan	25 January 1983 (aged 22)	2	0	(Barbados Football Association)
	FW	Llewellyn Riley	17 September 1972 (aged 32)	38	22	(Barbados Football Association) Notre Dame
	FW	Ryan Lucas	31 August 1977 (aged 27)	19	2	(Barbados Football Association) Notre Dame
	FW	Dwayne Stanford	18 December 1981 (aged 23)	3	1	(Barbados Football Association) Paradise
	FW	Michael Forde	20 August 1975 (aged 29)	20	5	(Barbados Football Association) Youth Milan

== Cuba ==
Head coach: (Cuba) Luis Armelio Garcia

No.	Pos.	Player	Date of birth (age)	Caps	Goals	Club
	GK	Odelín Molina	3 August 1974 (aged 30)	60	0	(Football Association of Cuba) Villa Clara
	GK	Vismel Castellanos	24 April 1976 (aged 28)	1	0	(Football Association of Cuba) Ciudad La Habana
	DF	Alexánder Cruzata	26 July 1974 (aged 30)	51	2	(Football Association of Cuba) Holguín
	DF	Yénier Márquez	3 January 1979 (aged 26)	42	3	(Football Association of Cuba) Villa Clara
	DF	Silvio Pedro	23 December 1976 (aged 28)	21	0	(Football Association of Cuba) Villa Clara
	DF	Mario Pedraza	18 July 1973 (aged 31)	29	2	(Football Association of Cuba) Cienfuegos
	DF	Reysander Fernández	22 August 1984 (aged 20)	12	1	(Football Association of Cuba) Ciego de Ávila
	MF	Jaime Colomé	30 June 1979 (aged 25)	12	1	(Football Association of Cuba) Ciudad La Habana
	MF	Disney Aquino	27 December 1977 (aged 27)	5	0	(Football Association of Cuba) Santiago de Cuba
	MF	Pedro Faife	14 January 1984 (aged 21)	10	1	(Football Association of Cuba) Villa Clara
	MF	Gisbel Morales	13 October 1978 (aged 26)	6	0	(Football Association of Cuba) Pinar del Río
	MF	Jorge Luis Ramírez	11 July 1977 (aged 27)	21	1	(Football Association of Cuba) Granma
	MF	Alain Cervantes	17 November 1983 (aged 21)	14	1	(Football Association of Cuba) Ciego de Ávila
	MF	Liván Pérez	1 January 1977 (aged 28)	20	0	(Football Association of Cuba) Ciego de Ávila
	FW	Reinier Alcántara	14 January 1982 (aged 23)	1	0	(Football Association of Cuba) Pinar del Río
	FW	Mario Gil	17 October 1985 (aged 19)	0	0	(Football Association of Cuba) Ciudad La Habana
	FW	Lester Moré	13 September 1978 (aged 26)	39	20	(Football Association of Cuba) Ciego de Ávila
	FW	Maykel Galindo	28 January 1981 (aged 24)	24	7	(Football Association of Cuba) Villa Clara

== Jamaica ==
Head coach: (Jamaica) Wendell Downswell

No.	Pos.	Player	Date of birth (age)	Caps	Goals	Club
1	GK	Shawn Sawyers	19 September 1976 (aged 28)	9	0	(Jamaica Football Federation) Portmore United
2	DF	Damion Stewart	18 August 1980 (aged 24)	26	1	(Jamaica Football Federation) Harbour View
3	FW	Richard West	19 July 1985 (aged 19)	2	0	(Jamaica Football Federation) Waterhouse
4	DF	Garfield Reid	14 January 1981 (aged 24)	11	0	(Jamaica Football Federation) Rivoli United
5	DF	Robert Scarlett	14 January 1979 (aged 26)	29	1	(Jamaica Football Federation) Harbour View
6	DF	Jermaine Taylor	14 January 1985 (aged 20)	7	0	(Jamaica Football Federation) Harbour View
7	DF	Tyrone Marshall	12 November 1974 (aged 30)	51	2	(United States Soccer Federation) LA Galaxy
8	DF	Fabian Davis	30 June 1974 (aged 30)	68	5	(Jamaica Football Federation) Tivoli Gardens
9	FW	Teafore Bennett	7 June 1984 (aged 20)	7	2	(Jamaica Football Federation) Village United
10	MF	Jermaine Hue	15 June 1978 (aged 26)	18	8	(Jamaica Football Federation) Harbour View
11	FW	Newton Sterling	12 November 1984 (aged 20)	0	0	(Jamaica Football Federation) Constant Spring
12	DF	Tyrone Sawyers	21 May 1981 (aged 23)	2	0	(Jamaica Football Federation) Portmore United
13	GK	Leighton Murray	22 September 1977 (aged 27)	0	0	(Jamaica Football Federation) Harbour View
14	FW	Luton Shelton	11 November 1985 (aged 19)	7	3	(Jamaica Football Federation) Harbour View
15	MF	Khari Stephenson	18 January 1981 (aged 24)	6	2	(United States Soccer Federation) Kansas City Wizards
16	MF	Omar Daley	25 April 1981 (aged 23)	32	3	(The Football Association) Preston North End
17	MF	Keith Kelly	5 March 1983 (aged 21)	9	0	(Jamaica Football Federation) Arnett Gardens
18	MF	Andy Williams	23 September 1977 (aged 27)	84	15	(United States Soccer Federation) Chicago Fire
19	FW	Roland Dean	13 October 1981 (aged 23)	8	6	(Jamaica Football Federation) Tivoli Gardens

== Trinidad and Tobago ==
Head coach: (Trinidad and Tobago) Bertille St. Clair

No.	Pos.	Player	Date of birth (age)	Caps	Goals	Club
	GK	Daurance Williams	13 May 1983 (aged 21)	13	0	(Trinidad and Tobago Football Association) San Juan Jabloteh
	GK	Jan-Michael Williams	26 October 1984 (aged 20)	4	0	(Trinidad and Tobago Football Association) W Connection
	DF	Keyeno Thomas	29 December 1977 (aged 27)	38	0	(Trinidad and Tobago Football Association) San Juan Jabloteh
	DF	Marlon Rojas	11 November 1979 (aged 25)	20	0	(United States Soccer Federation) Real Salt Lake
	DF	Derek King	12 April 1980 (aged 24)	30	1	(Trinidad and Tobago Football Association) Joe Public
	DF	Anton Pierre	23 September 1977 (aged 27)	45	1	(Trinidad and Tobago Football Association) Defence Force
	DF	Cyd Gray	21 November 1976 (aged 28)	25	1	(Trinidad and Tobago Football Association) San Juan Jabloteh
	DF	Dwayne Jack	19 January 1980 (aged 25)	0	0	(Trinidad and Tobago Football Association) Tobago United
	DF	Nigel Henry	24 May 1976 (aged 28)	0	0	(United States Soccer Federation) Charleston Battery
	MF	Leslie Fitzpatrick	11 November 1978 (aged 26)	14	1	(United States Soccer Federation) Atlanta Silverbacks
	MF	David Nakhid	15 May 1964 (aged 40)	29	6	(Lebanese Football Association) Al Mabarra
	MF	Densill Theobald	27 June 1982 (aged 22)	23	1	(Trinidad and Tobago Football Association) Caledonia AIA
	MF	Angus Eve	23 February 1973 (aged 31)	105	32	(Trinidad and Tobago Football Association) San Juan Jabloteh
	MF	Lyndon Andrews	20 January 1976 (aged 29)	46	0	(Trinidad and Tobago Football Association) South Starworld Strikers
	MF	Zé Luiz Seabra	25 January 1974 (aged 31)	3	0	(Trinidad and Tobago Football Association) W Connection
	MF	Kerry Baptiste	1 December 1981 (aged 23)	10	0	(Trinidad and Tobago Football Association) San Juan Jabloteh
	FW	Scott Sealy	6 April 1981 (aged 23)	12	2	(United States Soccer Federation) Kansas City Wizards
	FW	Cornell Glen	21 October 1980 (aged 24)	28	8	(United States Soccer Federation) Dallas Burn
	FW	Nigel Pierre	6 February 1979 (aged 26)	54	20	(Trinidad and Tobago Football Association) San Juan Jabloteh
	FW	Conrad Smith	4 December 1981 (aged 23)	14	4	(Canadian Soccer Association) Calgary Mustangs

Marlon Rojas and Cyd Gray were injured and replaced by Dwayne Jack and Nigel Henry
