= 2011 Barbados Premier Division =

Barbados Premier Division
- Season: 2011
- Matches played: 90
- Goals scored: 281 (3.12 per match)
- Biggest home win: 5–0 twice
- Biggest away win: 0–6 twice
- Highest scoring: 7 goals: thrice

The 2010–11 Barbados Premier Division (officially the Digicel Premiere League for sponsorship reasons) was the 65th season of the highest tier of football in Barbados. The season began on 13 February and concluded on 3 July. The league champions were Youth Milan, who won their second title, and their first since 2006.

== Changes from 2010 ==
- Silver Sands and BDF were relegated to the Barbados First Division.
- Bagatelle and St. John's Sonnets were promoted to the Premier Division.

== Table ==
Pos	Team	Pld	W	D	L	GF	GA	GD	Pts	Relegation
1	Youth Milan (C)	18	12	2	4	35	13	+22	38	
2	Notre Dame	18	9	6	3	40	20	+20	33	
3	Weymouth Wales	18	10	3	5	27	17	+10	33	
4	Brittons Hill	18	10	1	7	27	21	+6	31	
5	Pinelands United	18	8	6	4	28	22	+6	30	
6	Paradise	18	8	4	6	35	21	+14	28	
7	Pride of Gall Hill	18	6	3	9	28	30	−2	21	
8	Bagatelle	18	5	3	10	27	32	−5	18	
9	Saint John's Sonnets (R)	18	4	2	12	20	39	−19	14	Relegation to 2012 Barbados First Division
10	Ellerton (R)	18	3	0	15	14	55	−41	9	Relegation to 2012 Barbados First Division

Source: FIFA
Rules for classification: 1) points; 2) goal difference; 3) number of goals scored.
(C) Champions; (R) Relegated

=== Results ===
Home \ Away	BAG	BRT	ELL	NTD	PAR	PIN	PGH	SJS	WEY	YMI
Bagatelle		1–3	1–0	1–1	2–5	1–2	0–0	1–3	0–3	1–0
Brittons Hill	2–1		2–3	1–4	1–0	0–1	0–0	1–2	2–0	0–2
Ellerton	1–3	0–2		0–6	0–5	0–5	0–2	1–2	1–2	0–6
Notre Dame	2–1	1–3	3–1		2–2	0–1	4–2	5–0	2–1	2–0
Paradise	0–1	2–1	4–0	2–2		5–2	3–0	3–1	0–2	0–3
Pinelands United	2–1	0–3	2–0	1–0	0–0		2–1	2–2	0–0	1–3
Pride of Gall Hill	5–0	0–2	5–1	1–1	0–3	2–5		5–1	0–3	2–3
Saint John's Sonnets	1–2	1–2	3–4	0–2	0–0	1–0	1–2		1–2	1–5
Weymouth Wales	5–2	0–2	2–1	1–1	2–0	1–1	1–0	1–0		1–1
Youth Milan	0–0	3–0	0–1	2–1	2–1	1–1	0–1	1–0	2–0	

Updated to match(es) played on July 3, 2011. Source: FIFA
Legend: Blue = home team win; Yellow = draw; Red = away team win.

== Statistics ==
=== Top Scorers ===
Rank	Scorer	Club	Goals
1	(Barbados) Armando Lashley	Paradise SC	13
2	(Barbados) Gregory Goodridge	Brittons Hill	8
3	(Barbados) Dwayne Stanford	Weymouth Wales	7
4	(Barbados) Anson Barrow	Ellerton	5
4	(Barbados) Norman Forde	Youth Milan	5
4	(Barbados) Curtis Odle	Pride of Gall Hill	5

== Related Competitions ==
=== CFU Club Championship ===
As champions of the 2010 Barbados Premier Division, Notre Dame SC were allowed entry into the 2011 CFU Club Championship, to compete in the First elimination stage of the preliminary round. However, due to travel costs, Notre Dame declined to participate in the tournament. The last time a Barbadian club entered the tournament was in the 2000 CFU Club Championship in which Notre Dame finished second in their group during the first round, failing to qualify for the championship round.
