= List of football clubs in Barbados =

This is a list of football (soccer) clubs in Barbados. The Caribbean Premier League (CPL) of 2024 season was held from 30 August to 7 October with six teams in the fray.

== Digicel Premier Division ==
- Barbados Defense Force SC
- First Call Brittons Hill
- Silk Soy Beverly Hills - Relegated
- Carib Eden Stars
- Claytons Kola Tonic Notre Dame
- Caribsurf Paradise - Relegated
- Tropical Laundries Pride of Gall Hill
- Tudor Bridge
- Ajax Construction Silver Sands
- Arawak Cement Youth Milan
- UWI Blackbirds

== Division 1 ==
- Avis Pharmacy Haynesville
- Benfica
- BGI Insurance Lodge Road
- Chickmont Foods Fairy Valley
- Ellerton
- Families First St. John Sonnets
- Mackeson Oxley
- Maxwell
- Michael Lashley Clarkes Hill
- Pinelands
- Pizza Man Doc Sunrisae
- Ricky's Driving School Haggatt Hall
- Travel House Oxley
- Valrico Technico
- WIBISCO Hillaby

== Cave Shepherd Division 2 ==
=== Edwin Harding Zone ===
- Covenant Life Martinique
- Crusaders
- Families First St. John Sonnets
- Gatorade Villa United
- Hothersal Turning United
- Ivy Rovers
- Parish Land
- Restoration Ministries
- Savivas Christian Club
- Sea Freight (Barbados) Agencies Police

=== Carlos Griffith Zone ===
- Arawak Cement Youth Milan II
- Blackspurs
- Carlton
- Claytons Kola Tonic Notre Dame
- Cosmos
- Deacons
- Exactly Unified
- Grazettes
- Jackson
- Lazio
- Roam

=== Lambert Thomas Zone ===
- Ajax Construction Silver Sands II
- Arawak Cement Youth Milan II
- Barbados Defence Force
- Beverley Hills
- Carib Eden Stars
- Caribsurf Paradise
- Claytons Kola Tonic Notre Dame
- First Call Brittons Hill
- PCW Pinelands
- Tropical Laundries Pride of Gall Hill
- Tudor Bridge

== Arawak Cement Division 3 ==
=== Concrete Road Zone ===
- ATC Soccer Academy
- Barbados Fire Service
- Belfield
- Exactly Unified II
- Greens United
- Hothersal Turning
- Stag Haggatt Hall
- Station Hill
- Travel House Empire 'A'
- Travel House Empire 'B'

=== White Topping Zone ===
- Austin Husbands Phoenix
- Bagatelle FC
- Diamondshire Football Club
- Jackson II
- Orange Hill
- Pizza Man Doc Sunrise II
- Trents
- Wavell United
- WIBISCO Hillaby II

=== Slaked Lime Zone ===
- Barbados Youth Service
- Benfica
- BGI Insurance Lodge Road
- Caribsurf Paradise
- Dayrell's Road
- Maxwell II
- Michael Lashley Clarkes Hill
- Wanderers

== See also ==
- Sport in Barbados
