= 2016 Barbados FA Cup =

Tournament details
- Country: Barbados
- Teams: 16

Final positions
- Champions: Weymouth Wales
- Runner-up: Rendezvous

Tournament statistics
- Matches played: 15
- Goals scored: 63 (4.2 per match)

Awards
- Best player: Kemar Headley

The 2016 Barbados FA Cup was the 106th edition of the top knockout tournament in Barbados. The tournament was won by Weymouth Wales who defeated Rendezvous in the championship match. It was Weymouth's fifth domestic cup title.

The tournament began with the opening round on 26 March 2016 and ended with the final on 12 June 2016.

== Bracket ==
First round
BPD	Weymouth Wales	3
BDO	L&R United	0
BDO	Barbados Soccer Academy	0
BPD	Pinelands United	5
BDO	Sunrise Ballers	0
BPD	UWI Blackbirds	3
BDO	Potential Ballers	0
BPD	Notre Dame	3
BPD	Brittons Hill (a.e.t.)	2
BDO	Porey Springs	1
BPD	Paradise	7
BDO	Maxwell	1
BDO	Ellerton	0
BPD	BDF	3
BDO	Bagatelle	0
BPD	Rendezvous	6

Quarterfinals
BPD	Weymouth Wales	6
BPD	Pinelands United	4
BPD	UWI Blackbirds	4
BPD	Notre Dame	2
BPD	Brittons Hill	1
BPD	Paradise	0
BPD	BDF	0
BPD	Rendezvous	1

Semifinals
BPD	Weymouth Wales	2
BPD	UWI Blackbirds	0
BPD	Brittons Hill	1
BPD	Rendezvous	4

Final
BPD	Weymouth Wales (a.e.t.)	4
BPD	Rendezvous	1

== Results ==
=== First round ===
March 26	Sunrise Ballers (2)	0–3	UWI Blackbirds (1)

March 27	Potential Ballers (2)	0–3	Notre Dame (1)

March 27	Brittons Hill (1)	2–1 (a.e.t.)	Porey Springs (2)

April 11	Barbados Soccer Academy (2)	0–5	Pinelands United (1)

April 12	Weymouth Wales (1)	3–0	L&R United (2)

April 12	Paradise (1)	7–1	Maxwell (2)

April 13	Ellerton (2)	0–3	BDF (1)

April 13	Bagatelle (2)	0–6	Rendezvous (1)

=== Quarter-finals ===
April 16	Weymouth Wales (1)	6–4	Pinelands United (1)

April 16	UWI Blackbirds (1)	4–2	Notre Dame (1)

April 17	Brittons Hill (1)	1–0	Paradise (1)

April 17	BDF (1)	0–1	Rendezvous (1)

=== Semi-finals ===
May 15	Weymouth Wales (1)	2–0	UWI Blackbirds (1)	Bridgetown
				Stadium: Barbados National Stadium

May 15	Brittons Hill (1)	1–4	Rendezvous (1)	Bridgetown
				Stadium: Barbados National Stadium

=== Final ===
June 12	Weymouth Wales (1)	4–1 (a.e.t.)	Rendezvous (1)	Bridgetown
	Headley 89'; Riv. Williams 105'; Ren. Williams 114'; Harewood 117'		Stanford 8'	Stadium: Barbados National Stadium

== See also ==
- 2016 Barbados Premier Division
