= 2017 Barbados Premier League =

Barbados Premier League
- Season: 2017
- Champions: Weymouth Wales
- CFU Club Championship: Weymouth Wales
- Matches: 90
- Goals: 305 (3.39 per match)
- Top goalscorer: Dario Harewood (13)
- Biggest home win: Weymouth Wales 8-0 Waterford Compton (19 March 2017)
- Biggest away win: Waterford Compton 0-7 Weymouth Wales (27 May 2017)
- Highest scoring: Rendezvous 9-2 Waterford Compton (7 May 2017)
- Longest winning run: Weymouth Wales (5)
- Longest unbeaten run: Weymouth Wales (11)
- Longest winless run: Brittons Hill (9)
- Longest losing run: Belfield (8)
- All statistics correct as of 14 May 2017.

The 2017 Barbados Premier League (officially the Digicel Premier League for sponsorship reasons) is the 71st season of the highest tier of football in Barbados. UWI Blackbirds are the defending champions, coming off their first league title.

== Changes from 2016 ==
- Empire Club and Pinelands United were relegated to Barbados Division One.
- Ellerton and Waterford Compton were promoted to the Premier League.

== Table ==
Pos	Team	Pld	W	D	L	GF	GA	GD	Pts	Qualification or relegation
1	Weymouth Wales	18	13	4	1	51	13	+38	43	Qualification for 2018 Caribbean Club Championship
2	BDF	18	11	5	2	46	21	+25	38	
3	Rendezvous	18	10	4	4	44	29	+15	34	
4	Paradise	18	9	3	6	28	17	+11	30	
5	Notre Dame	18	8	5	5	29	29	0	29	
6	UWI Blackbirds	18	6	6	6	33	23	+10	24	
7	Ellerton	18	5	5	8	22	35	−13	20	
8	Brittons Hill	18	2	6	10	16	31	−15	12	
9	Waterford Compton	18	3	2	13	18	69	−51	11	Relegation to 2018 Barbados Division One
10	Belfield	18	2	2	14	21	41	−20	8	Relegation to 2018 Barbados Division One

Updated to match(es) played on 28 May 2017. Source: Barbadosfa.com
Rules for classification: 1) points; 2) goal difference; 3) number of goals scored.

== Positions by round ==
Leader
Relegation to Ligue 2

Team ╲ Round	1	2	3	4	5	6	7	8	9	10	11	12	13	14	15	16	17	18
Weymouth Wales	1	2	2	1	1	1	2	2	2	1	1	2	2	1	1	1	1	1
BDF	2	1	1	2	2	2	1	1	1	2	2	1	1	2	2	2	2	2
Rendezvous	10	5	3	3	3	3	3	3	3	3	3	3	3	3	3	3	3	3
Paradise	3	4	5	7	5	4	4	4	5	4	4	5	5	5	4	6	4	4
Notre Dame	9	6	4	4	4	5	5	5	6	6	5	4	4	4	6	4	5	5
UWI Blackbirds	4	7	8	6	7	7	7	7	7	7	7	7	7	6	5	5	6	6
Ellerton	4	3	7	5	6	6	6	6	4	5	6	6	6	7	7	7	7	7
Brittons Hill	4	9	9	9	9	10	10	10	10	9	9	9	8	8	8	8	8	8
Waterford Compton	8	10	10	10	10	9	9	9	9	10	10	10	10	10	10	9	9	9
Belfield	4	8	5	8	8	8	8	8	8	8	8	8	9	9	9	10	10	10

Updated to match(es) played on 28 May 2017. Source: Soccerway

== Statistics ==
=== Top scorers ===
Rank	Scorer	Club	Goals
1	(Trinidad and Tobago) Dario Harewood	UWI Blackbirds	13
2	(Barbados) Shakille Belle	Ellerton	10
2	(Barbados) Zeco Edmee	Notre Dame	10
2	(Barbados) Hadan Holligan	Weymouth Wales	10
2	(Barbados) Arantees Lawrence	Weymouth Wales	10
6	(Barbados) Armando Lashley	Paradise	9
6	(Saint Vincent and the Grenadines) Shandel Samuel	Rendezvous	9
8	(Barbados) Shaquille Boyce	BDF	8
8	(Barbados) Alvin Chapman	Belfield	8
8	(Barbados) Rashad Jules	BDF	8

=== Hat-tricks ===
Player	Club	Against	Result	Date
Mario Harte	UWI Blackbirds	Waterford Compton	4-0	2 February 2017
Armando Lashley	Paradise	Notre Dame	1-5	16 February 2017
Shaquille Boyce	BDF	Waterford Compton	0-7	26 February 2017
Omani Leacock	BDF	Waterford Compton	0-7	26 February 2017
Zeco Edmee^{4}	Notre Dame	UWI Blackbirds	4-4	2 March 2017
Arantees Lawrence	Weymouth Wales	Waterford Compton	8-0	19 March 2017
Armando Lashley	Paradise	BDF	3-0	2 April 2017
Ray Snagg	Rendezvous	Ellerton	0-5	2 April 2017
Dario Harewood^{4}	UWI Blackbirds	Waterford Compton	1-5	9 April 2017
Dwayne Stanford	Rendezvous	Belfield	6-3	15 April 2017
Dario Harewood	UWI Blackbirds	Belfield	2-4	7 May 2017
Shandel Samuel	Rendezvous	Waterford Compton	9-2	7 May 2017

^{4} Player scored 4 goals.

== Attendances ==
The average league attendance was 194.

#	Club	Average
1	Weymouth Wales	613
2	Notre Dame	235
3	BDF	197
4	UWI Blackbirds	176
5	Rendezvous	169
6	Paradise	142
7	Ellerton	138
8	Brittons Hill	112
9	Waterford Compton	87
10	Belfield	73
