= 2010 Barbados Premier Division =

Barbados Premier Division
- Season: 2010
- Champions: Notre Dame SC
- CFU Club Championship: Notre Dame (Note: Notre Dame SC declined to participate in the 2011 CFU Club Championship)
- Matches played: 90
- Goals scored: 281 (3.12 per match)
- Biggest home win: 5–0 twice
- Biggest away win: 0–6 twice
- Highest scoring: 7 goals: three times

The 2010 Barbados Premier Division (officially the Digicel Premiere League for sponsorship reasons) was the 64th season of the highest tier of football in Barbados. The season began on 15 February and concluded on 25 June. The league champions were Notre Dame SC.

== Changes from 2010 ==
- The league decreased in size from 11 teams down to 10
- Eden Stars, Technico and Maxwell were relegated to the Barbados First Division.
- Pinelands United and Ellerton were promoted to the Premier Division.

== Table ==
Pos	Team	Pld	W	D	L	GF	GA	GD	Pts	Qualification or relegation
1	Notre Dame (C)	17	13	2	2	32	11	+21	41	2011 CFU Club Championship
2	Brittons Hill	17	11	2	4	28	12	+16	35	
3	Youth Milan	17	10	2	5	33	19	+14	32	
4	Weymouth Wales	17	8	4	5	25	15	+10	28	
5	Pride of Gall Hill	17	8	3	6	18	12	+6	27	
6	Paradise	17	3	8	6	14	16	−2	17	
7	Ellerton	17	3	7	7	20	31	−11	16	
8	Pinelands United	17	3	5	9	16	30	−14	14	
9	Silver Sands (R)	17	2	4	11	16	37	−21	10	Relegation to 2011 Barbados First Division
10	Barbados Defence Force (R)	9	1	1	7	3	22	−19	4	Relegation to 2011 Barbados First Division (Note: BDF withdrew from the competition midway through the season.)

Source: RSSSF
Rules for classification: 1) points; 2) goal difference; 3) number of goals scored.
(C) Champions; (R) Relegated

=== Results ===
Home \ Away	BDF	BRT	ELL	NTD	PAR	PIN	PGH	SIL	WEY	YMI
Barbados Defence Force		0–3 (Note: BDF withdrew from the league on March 15 and all remaining matches from the first half of the season were awarded 0–3 losses against them.)	0–3	0–1	0–3	2–0	0–3	0–3	0–3	0–6
Brittons Hill	2–0		4–1	1–2	1–0	2–1	0–0	3–0	2–1	0–1
Ellerton	1–1	1–3		2–3	1–1	0–0	1–3	1–0	1–1	1–1
Notre Dame	3–0	0–1	0–2		1–1	2–1	1–0	1–0	0–0	4–0
Paradise	3–0	1–3	0–1	0–2		0–0	0–1	1–1	1–2	3–1
Pinelands United	3–0	0–2	1–1	1–5	0–0		1–0	1–2	1–0	2–4
Pride of Gall Hill	3–0	0–0	2–1	0–2	0–1	1–1		3–0	0–1	1–0
Silver Sands	3–0	0–3	3–3	0–4	1–1	2–4	1–2		1–2	1–6
Weymouth Wales	3–0	2–1	3–1	1–2	1–1	4–0	1–2	1–1		0–1
Youth Milan	3–0	2–0	5–1	1–2	0–0	3–2	1–0	1–0	0–2	

Updated to match(es) played on July 3, 2011. Source: RSSF
Legend: Blue = home team win; Yellow = draw; Red = away team win.

== Statistics ==
=== Top Scorers ===
Rank	Scorer	Club	Goals
1	(Barbados) Kyle Gibson	Notre Dame	13
2	(Barbados) Gregory Goodridge	Brittons Hill	8
3	(Barbados) Dwayne Stanford	Weymouth Wales	7
4	(Barbados) Anson Barrow	Ellerton	5
4	(Barbados) Norman Foode	Youth Milan	5
4	(Barbados) Curtis Olde	Pride of Gall Hill	5
