= 2018–19 Barbados Premier League =

Barbados Premier League
- Season: 2018–19
- Champions: Barbados Defence Force
- Relegated: Barbados Soccer Academy; Youth Milan; Porey Springs
- Caribbean Club Shield: Barbados Defence Force

The 2018–19 Barbados Premier League was the 73rd season of the Barbados Premier League, the top division football competition in Barbados. The season began on 21 October 2018. The regular season ended on 5 May 2019, which was followed by three-legged final in which Barbados Defence Force defeated Weymouth Wales for their sixth title.

== Regular season ==
As with the previous season, the 12 teams were divided into two zones of six teams each. Barbados Soccer Academy, St. Andrew Lions, and Youth Milan were promoted from the previous season of Barbados Division One.

=== Zone 1 ===
Pos	Team	Pld	W	D	L	GF	GA	GD	Pts	Qualification or relegation
1	Weymouth Wales	22	12	5	5	52	19	+33	41	Advance to Championship final
2	University of the West Indies	22	10	6	6	60	30	+30	36	Advance to Third place match
3	Notre Dame	22	8	3	11	43	73	−30	27	
4	Brittons Hill	22	4	7	11	35	44	−9	19	
5	Porey Springs	22	4	3	15	27	70	−43	15	Relegation playoffs
6	Barbados Soccer Academy	22	3	3	16	19	67	−48	12	Relegation playoffs

Source: Soccerway

=== Zone 2 ===
Pos	Team	Pld	W	D	L	GF	GA	GD	Pts	Qualification or relegation
1	Barbados Defence Force	22	16	4	2	75	17	+58	52	Advance to Championship final
2	Empire	22	15	4	3	44	23	+21	49	Advance to Third place match
3	Paradise	22	13	5	4	68	24	+44	44	
4	Ellerton	22	11	4	7	41	30	+11	37	
5	St. Andrew Lions	22	9	3	10	35	34	+1	30	Relegation playoffs
6	Youth Milan	22	2	3	17	14	82	−68	9	Relegation playoffs

Source: Soccerway

== Championship final ==
=== First leg ===
16 May 2019

Barbados Defence Force	2–2	Weymouth Wales

=== Second leg ===
19 May 2019

Weymouth Wales	0–2	Barbados Defence Force

=== Third leg ===
26 May 2019

Barbados Defence Force	1–2 (a.e.t.)	Weymouth Wales

Barbados Defence Force won championship qualified for Caribbean Club Shield.

== Third place match ==
19 May 2019

University of the West Indies	5–1	Empire

== Relegation playoffs ==
=== Semifinals ===
16 May 2019

Porey Springs	2–1 (a.e.t.)	Youth Milan

19 May 2019

St. Andrew Lions	5–1	Barbados Soccer Academy

Youth Milan and Barbados Soccer Academy relegated.

=== Final ===
26 May 2019

Porey Springs	0–6	St. Andrew Lions

Porey Springs relegated.

== Finalists ==
Team	Location	Stadium	Capacity
Barbados Defence Force Sports Program	Bridgetown	Wildey Turf	2,000
Weymouth Wales	Bridgetown	Wildey Turf	2,000
