= 2014 Barbados Premier Division =

Statistics from the 2014 Barbados Premier Division:

Pos	Team	Pld	W	D	L	GF	GA	GD	Pts	Qualification or relegation
1	Barbados Defence Force (BDF) (C)	18	13	2	3	54	21	+33	41	Champion
2	Brittons Hill	18	12	3	3	40	7	+33	39	
3	Pride of Gall Hill	18	11	3	4	40	7	+33	36	
4	Weymouth Wales	18	10	2	6	31	21	+10	32	
5	Paradise	18	9	0	9	30	30	0	27	
6	Notre Dame	18	8	3	7	26	26	0	27	
7	Pinelands	18	7	2	9	40	37	+3	23	
8	Silver Sands	18	5	1	12	21	45	−24	16	
9	Cosmos (R)	19	2	3	14	12	29	−17	9	Relegation to Barbados First Division
10	Dayrells Road (R)	18	1	3	14	11	62	−51	6	Relegation to Barbados First Division

Updated to match(es) played on unknown. Source:
Rules for classification: 1) Points; 2) Goal difference; 3) Number of goals scored
(C) Champions; (R) Relegated
