= 2020 Barbados Premier League =

Barbados Premier League
- Season: 2020
- Dates: 1 February – 17 March 2020

The 2020 Barbados Premier League was the 75th season of the Barbados Premier League, the top division football competition in Barbados. The season began on 1 February 2020. The season was suspended on 17 March 2020 due to the COVID-19 pandemic.

== Table ==
Pos	Team	Pld	W	D	L	GF	GA	GD	Pts	Qualification or relegation
1	Weymouth Wales	7	5	1	1	16	4	+12	16	Qualification to Caribbean Club Shield
2	BDF	7	4	3	0	19	8	+11	15	
3	Paradise	7	3	2	2	13	8	+5	11	
4	Notre Dame	7	3	2	2	12	13	−1	11	
5	Empire	7	3	1	3	13	10	+3	10	
6	Deacons	7	3	1	3	10	11	−1	10	
7	Wotton	7	3	0	4	9	12	−3	9	
8	UWI Blackbirds	7	1	4	2	12	13	−1	7	
9	Ellerton	7	1	4	2	10	12	−2	7	Relegation to the Barbados First Division
10	Saint Andrew Lions	7	1	4	2	10	13	−3	7	Relegation to the Barbados First Division
11	Silver Sands	7	2	0	5	7	19	−12	6	Relegation to the Barbados First Division
12	Brittons Hill	7	1	2	4	3	11	−8	5	Relegation to the Barbados First Division

Updated to match(es) played on 17 March 2020. Source: RSSSF
