= Jaron Oughterson =

Barbadian footballer

Personal information
- Full name: Jaron Akeem Oughterson
- Date of birth: 11 May 2001 (age 25)
- Place of birth: Bridgetown, Barbados
- Position: Forward

Team information
- Current team: Appalachian FC
- Number: 10

Senior career*
Years	Team	Apps	(Gls)
–2024	UWI Blackbirds		
2024–2025	Brittons HIll		
2025–2026	Appalachian FC	12	(8)
2026	Paradise FC		
2026–	Appalachian FC	8	(0)

International career^{‡}
2023–	Barbados	8	(4)
- * Club domestic league appearances and goals as of 02:25, 29 August 2026 (UTC) ‡ National team caps and goals as of 02:25, 29 August 2026 (UTC)

Jaron Oughterson (born 11 May 2001) is a Barbadian footballer who plays as a forward for Appalachian FC of the USL League Two, and the Barbados national team.

== Club career ==
Domestically, Oughterson played for the UWI Blackbirds in the Barbados Premier League. He scored a brace against Brittons Hill FC in the bronze medal match of the 2023 Barbados FA Cup. UWI won the match 3–1. In 2024, the team won the inaugural Prime Minister's Cup with an unbeaten record in the competition. Oughterson scored in the tournament final as the Blackbirds again defeated Brittons Hill FC 3–2 The following season, Oughterson moved to Britton Hill and was again an attacking threat as the club advanced to the knockout round of the 2025 edition of the tournament.

In 2025, Oughterson moved to Appalachian FC of the National Premier Soccer League in the United States. The club won its season opener against Port City FC 4–1. Oughterson scored two goals in the first six minutes of the match and finished off his hat-trick in the 56th minute. He scored two more goals against Greenville United FC in the club's next match for five total goals in his first two matches. That season, the club advanced to the Southeast Division finals with a 6–1 semi-final victory over Charlottetowne Hops FC. Oughterson scored his eighth goal of the season in the match. Appalachian FC would go on to lose the conference final 0–1 to Hickory FC. In total, Oughterson scored eight goals in twelve matches that season, tying him for eighth place in the league scoring chart.

Following the 2025 NPSL season, Oughterson returned to Barbados and joined Paradise FC ahead of the 2026 BPL season. He scored against the UWI Blackbirds in the opening match of the season. Paradise FC went on to defeat the player's former club to open its campaign. Paradise SC was a title contender that season, at times holding top position in the league table. In June 2026, Paradise SC defeated Weymouth Wales FC in the final of the Barbados FA Cup. Oughterson scored the tying goal in the 77th minute in the eventual 3–2 victory. Later in summer 2026, Oughterson returned to Appalachian FC for the 2026 season as the club moved from the NPSL to the USL League Two. As one of the squad's returnees from the previous season, he quickly became a key member of the roster, appearing in the club's first three matches of the season. In total, he went on to make eight league appearances for the club that season.

== International career ==
Oughterson made his senior international debut on 13 October 2023 in a 2023–24 CONCACAF Nations League B match against the Dominican Republic. He scored his first two international goals on 12 November 2025 in a 2025–26 CONCACAF Series victory over Bonaire. He went on to score further goals against Saint Martin and Saint Vincent and the Grenadines in the same competition.

=== International goals ===
Scores and results list Barbados's goal tally first.

No.	Date	Venue	Opponent	Score	Result	Competition
1.	12 November 2025	Sir Vivian Richards Stadium, North Sound, Antigua and Barbuda	Bonaire	1–0	3–2	2025–26 CONCACAF Series
2.	12 November 2025	Sir Vivian Richards Stadium, North Sound, Antigua and Barbuda	Bonaire	3–0	3–2	2025–26 CONCACAF Series
3.	26 March 2026	Stadion Antonio Trenidat, Rincon, Bonaire	Saint Martin	1–2	1–3	2025–26 CONCACAF Series
4.	29 March 2026	Stadion Antonio Trenidat, Rincon, Bonaire	Saint Vincent and the Grenadines	2–2	2–3	2025–26 CONCACAF Series
Last updated 28 August 2026

=== International career statistics ===
As of match played 29 March 2026.

Barbados
Year	Apps	Goals
2023	2	0
2024	2	0
2025	2	2
2026	2	2
Total	8	4
