= Afro-Barbadians =

Total population
- 95.5% of the Barbadian population (92.4% black and 3.1% multiracial).

Languages
- Bajan English, Bajan Creole

Religion
- Christianity, Rastafari, Afro-American religions, Traditional African religions

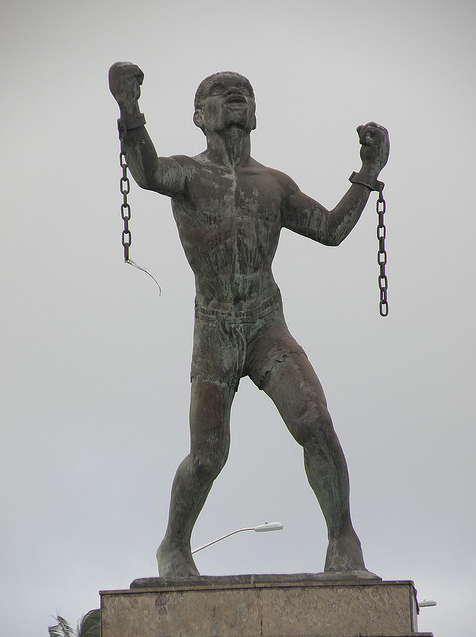
Statue of African-born slave revolt leader Bussa

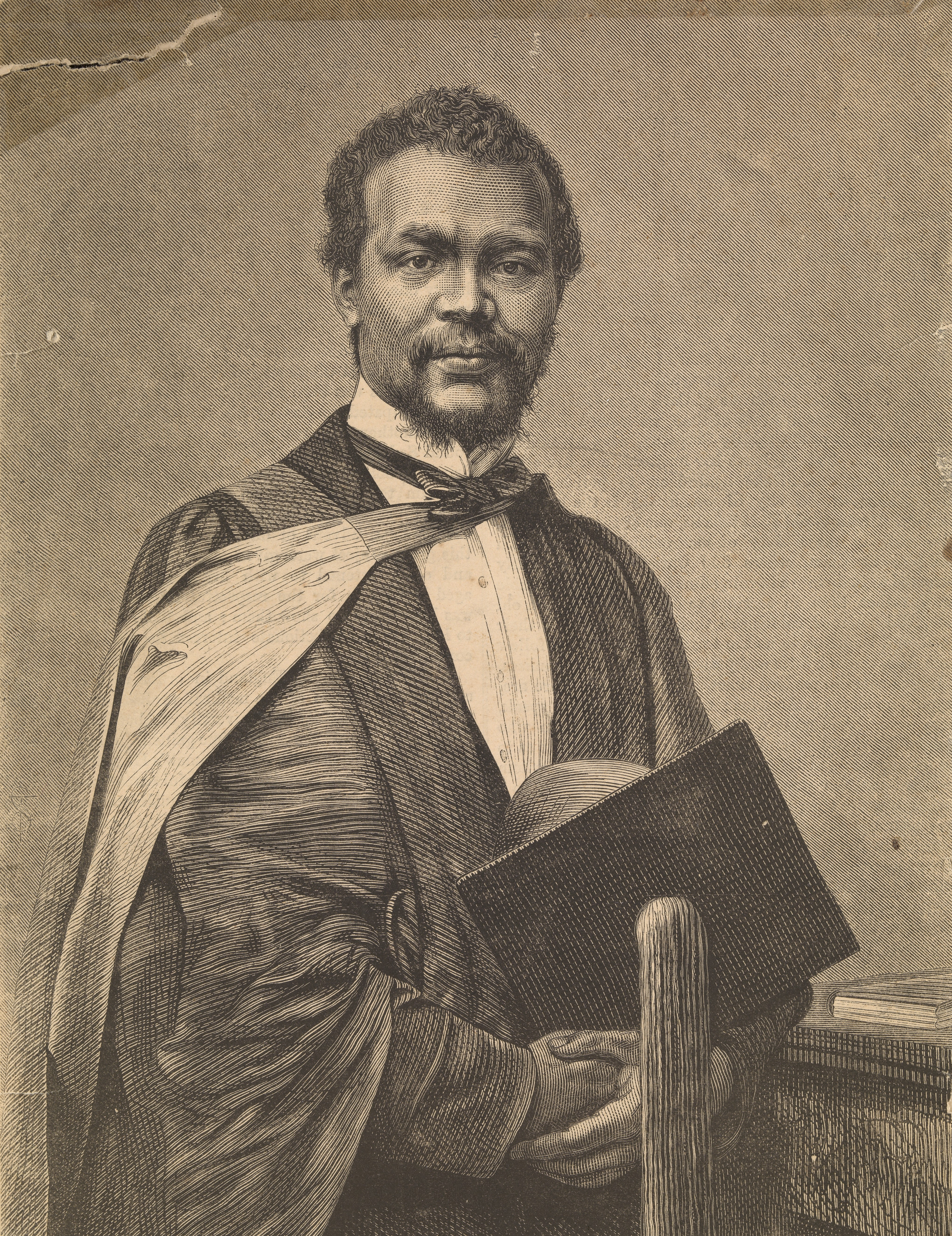
Portrait of Barbadian Dr. Christopher James Davis

Black Barbadians or Afro-Bajans are Barbadians of entirely or predominantly African descent.

92.4% of Barbados's population is black and 3.1% is multiracial, based on estimates in 2010.

== Origins ==
Most of the enslaved Africans brought to Barbados were from the Bight of Biafra (62,000 Africans), the Gold Coast (59,000 Africans), and the Bight of Benin (45,000 Africans). Other African slaves came from Central Africa (29,000 slaves), Senegambia (14,000 Africans), the Windward Coast (13,000 slaves) and from Sierra Leone (9,000 slaves).

Africans from the Bight of Biafra were primarily Igbo, Ibibio and Efik; Africans from the Gold Coast were primarily Akan (mainly Fante and Asante); Africans from the Bight of Benin were primarily Yoruba, Ewe and Fon; and Africans from Central Africa were primarily Kongo.

The Royal African Company in Barbados had its own preference on the origins of the slaves for work. Thus, the company considered, as reported once, that certain slaves were worth more than other slaves from a specific region.

== History ==
The Portuguese and the Spanish arrived in Barbados following 1492, yet they did not establish any colonies on the island. In the mid-sixteenth century, the Spanish asserted that Barbados was uninhabited. However, by the mid-seventeenth century, Barbados had become the most densely populated and profitable colony in the English Americas. Barbados was initially inhabited by Arawaks who came from Venezuela. Slavery in Barbados began with Henry Powell and English settlers who established a colony, which they then developed Barbados as a sugar plantation economy using African slaves.

When English settlers first arrived in the 1620s on the island, Barbados was mostly unpopulated. Its indigenous Amerindian inhabitants had either fled to other countries or had been captured by European slave traders. As the colonists adopted sugar production as Barbados's central industry, the European colonists passed laws legitimizing slavery and established big plantations reliant on enslaved Africans.

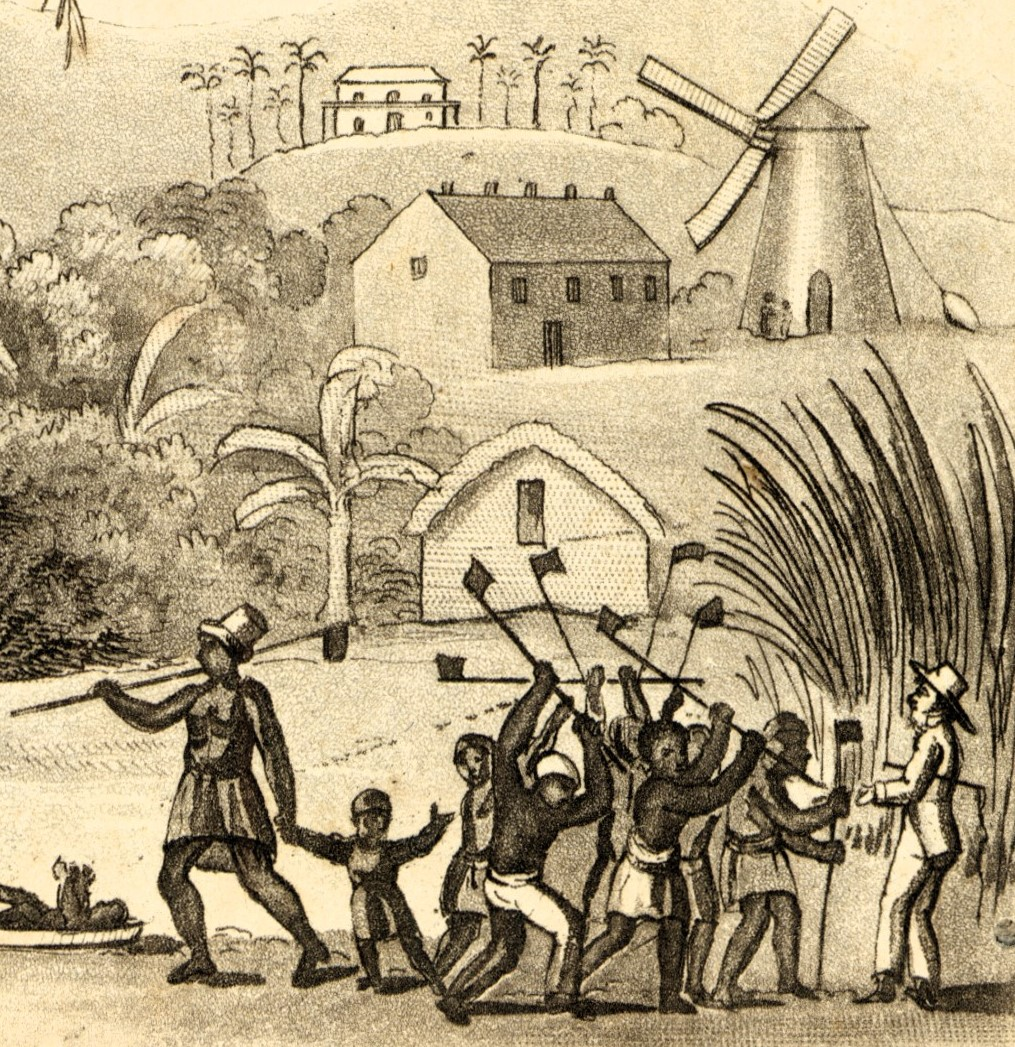
Afro-Barbadians working on a plantation in Barbados.

Rum and sugar was the focus of the industry In Barbados. As it developed into the main commercial enterprise, Barbados was divided into large plantation estates, which replaced the small holdings of the early English settlers as the wealthy planters pushed out the poor. The Irish, as they were called, were the poor white slaves and planters that became the first police force and fishermen of Barbados. Some of the displaced farmers relocated to the English colonies in North America, most notably South Carolina. To work the plantations, black Africans were imported as slaves in such numbers that in the last two decades of the 17th century, blacks outnumbered whites by a margin of two to one, and, in the 18th century, there were three blacks for every one planter. Sugar cane dominated Barbados's economic growth, and the island's cash crop was at the top of the sugar industry until 1720.

Roberts (2006) showed that slaves did not spend the majority of time in restricted roles cultivating, harvesting, and processing sugarcane – the island's most important cash crop. Rather, slaves were involved in various activities and in multiple roles: raising livestock, fertilizing soil, growing provisional crops, maintaining plantation infrastructure, caregiving, and various other tasks. One notable soil-management technique was intercropping, planting subsistence crops between the rows of cash crops – which demanded of the slaves skilled and experienced observations of growing conditions for efficient land use.

In the mid-1640s, the population of Barbados was estimated at over 18,000, many of whom were coerced or voluntary indentured servants, but the number of "Negro slaves" was around 8,000. By the mid-1650s, there was near parity with 20,000 Africans and 25,000 Europeans. By the mid-1670s, there were approximately 33,000 enslaved people and 21,500 Europeans (both indentured and free).

Due to the increased implementation of slave codes, which created differential treatment between Africans and the European workers and ruling planter class, the island became increasingly unattractive to poor whites. Slave codes were implemented in 1661, 1676, 1682, and 1688. In response to these codes, several slave rebellions were attempted or planned during this time, but none succeeded. Nevertheless, planters expanded their importation of African slaves to cultivate sugar cane.

By 1660, Barbados generated more trade than all of the other English colonies combined. This remained the case until it eventually was surpassed by geographically larger islands like Jamaica in 1713. Even so, in 1730–31 the estimated value of the colony of Barbados was as much as £5,500,000.

From the beginning of the eighteenth century, most blacks of Barbados had been born on the island, which facilitated the creation of a Barbadian identity since these years. Moreover, as occurred in the white population, the percentage was much higher women than men, unlike in other Caribbean islands, where it was the opposite. This facilitated the reproduction of the black population during the second half of the 18th century without having to rely on new imports of Africans to maintain the same output of slave labor. In addition, the birth rate was higher than the mortality rate. However, in the early 19th century, there continued to be imported African slaves in Barbados. Increasingly after 1750, the plantations were owned by absentee landlords living in Great Britain and operated by hired managers.

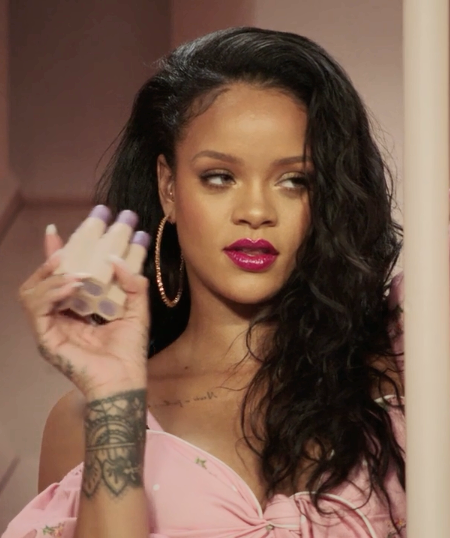
Afro-Barbadian singer Rihanna

It is estimated that, between 1627 and 1807, approximately 387,000 enslaved Africans were sent to Barbados. Barbados (Bridgetown, in particular), re-exported many slaves to North America, other Caribbean islands, and the Captaincy General of Venezuela. Later, the Royal African Company established offices in Jamaica and Barbados. Thus, slaves were re-exported from Jamaica to Mexico, while slaves were re-exported from Barbados to Venezuela. The slave trade ceased in 1807, and slaves were emancipated in Barbados in 1834.

== Afro-Barbadian culture ==
Barbadian culture and music are mixtures of African and European elements, with influence from the Indigenous peoples of the island.

Barbadian culture is syncretic, and the island's musical culture is perceived as a mixture of African and British music, with certain unique elements that derive from Indigenous sources. Tension between African and British culture has long been a major element of Barbadian history, and has included the banning of certain African-derived practices and Afro-Barbadian parodies of British traditions.

Barbadian cuisine includes a blend of foods with African and British influences. Cou-Cou, a dish made with cornmeal and okra or breadfruit and green banana is of African origin.

Most Barbadians are Christian (whether practicing or otherwise). The Rastafari movement also has its community of adherents.

== Notable people ==
- Abiola Grant
- Ackeel Applewhaite
- Hadan Holligan
- Nadre Butcher
- Kieran Gibbs
- Emmerson Boyce
- Rihanna
- Tajio James
- Thierry Gale
- Yewande Omotoso
- Danny Gabbidon
- Nick Blackman
- Louie Soares
- Tom Soares
- Jomo Harris
- La'Vere Corbin-Ong
- Rashad Jules
- Rhian Brewster
- Sikisa Bostwick-Barnes
- Nicoli Brathwaite
- Nathan Stewart-Jarett

== See also ==
- White Barbadians
