= Norman Forde =

Barbadian footballer (born 1977)

Personal information
- Date of birth: 30 April 1977 (age 49)
- Place of birth: Barbados
- Position: Midfielder

Youth career
- Nottingham Forest
- Youth Milan

Senior career*
Years	Team	Apps	(Gls)
1997–2022	Youth Milan		(39+)
2001	→ Barbados U21 (loan)		(10)
2008	→ Notre Dame (loan)	20	(13)
2012	→ Firehouse (loan)		
2022	Empire Club		
Total		20+	(62+)

International career
1998–2011	Barbados	74	(18)
- * Club domestic league appearances and goals

Norman Forde (born 30 April 1977) is a Barbadian former footballer who played as a midfielder.

== Club career ==
He started his career as an apprentice with Nottingham Forest, where his progress was inhibited by a succession of injuries.

The midfielder then joined Youth Milan in the Barbados Premier Division in 1997. He joined Barbados U21 on loan in 2001 and scored ten goals. He also joined Notre Dame SC on loan in 2008 and was the Barbados Premier Division top scorer with thirteen goals. He was also on loan with Firehouse in 2012 during the LIME Pelican Football Challenge 2012.

He was part of the Youth Milan team which was relegated to Barbados Division One in 2013 and promoted back to the Barbados Premier League in 2018. In 2019, he stayed with the club after they were relegated after only one season back in the Barbados Premier League.

He joined Empire Club for the 2022 season before retiring.

Forde has won the League Championship three times – in 2006 and 2011 with Youth Milan, and in 2008 while on loan at Notre Dame.

== International career ==
He played for the Barbados national team between 1998 and 2011, having started in both of their first round World Cup qualification matches in 2008 as well as captaining the national side in the second leg against Dominica. He was part of the Barbados team which finished in fourth place during the 2005 Caribbean Cup.

== Career statistics ==
=== Club ===
Appearances and goals by club, season and competition
Club	Season	League		
Club	Season	Division	Apps	Goals
Youth Milan	1997	Barbados Premier Division		
Youth Milan	1998	Barbados Premier Division		
Youth Milan	1999	Barbados Premier Division		
Youth Milan	2000	Barbados Premier Division		
Youth Milan	2001	Barbados Premier Division		5
Youth Milan	2002	Barbados Premier Division		1
Youth Milan	2003	Barbados Premier Division		1
Youth Milan	2004	Barbados Premier Division		0
Youth Milan	2005	Barbados Premier Division		9
Youth Milan	2006	Barbados Premier Division		3
Youth Milan	2007	Barbados Premier Division		6
Youth Milan	2008	Barbados Premier Division	0	0
Youth Milan	2009	Barbados Premier Division		8
Youth Milan	2010	Barbados Premier Division		6
Youth Milan	2011	Barbados Premier Division		
Youth Milan	2012	Barbados Premier Division		
Youth Milan	2013	Barbados Premier Division		
Youth Milan	2014	Barbados Division One		
Youth Milan	2015	Barbados Division One		
Youth Milan	2016	Barbados Division One		
Youth Milan	2017	Barbados Division One		
Youth Milan	2018	Barbados Division One		
Youth Milan	2019	Barbados Premier League	2	0
Youth Milan	2020	Barbados Division One		
Youth Milan	2021	Barbados Division One		
Youth Milan	2022	Barbados Division One		
Barbados U21 (loan)	2001	Barbados Premier Division		10
Notre Dame (loan)	2008	Barbados Premier Division	20	13
Firehouse (loan)	2012	LIME Pelican Football Challenge 2012		
Empire Club	2022	Barbados Premier League		
Career total			22+	62+

=== International ===
Appearances and goals by national team and year
National team	Year	Apps	Goals
Barbados	1998	1	0
Barbados	2000	11	1
Barbados	2001	2	2
Barbados	2002	3	0
Barbados	2003	2	0
Barbados	2004	5	1
Barbados	2005	7	2
Barbados	2006	10	2
Barbados	2007	3	0
Barbados	2008	17	8
Barbados	2009	1	0
Barbados	2010	5	2
Barbados	2011	6	0
Total		74	18

#	Date	Venue	Opponent	Score	Result	Competition
?	March 18, 2000	St. George's, Grenada	Grenada	3-2	Win	2002 WCQ
?	April 4, 2001	Paramaribo	Guyana	2-1	Win	2001 Caribbean Cup
?	April 8, 2001	Paramaribo	Aruba	5-2	Win	2001 Caribbean Cup
?	November 19, 2006	Bridgetown	Bahamas	2-1	Win	2007 Caribbean Cup
?	November 21, 2006	Bridgetown	Saint Vincent and the Grenadines	3-0	Win	2007 Caribbean Cup
?	September 26, 2008	Basseterre	British Virgin Islands	2-1	Win	2008 Caribbean Championship
?	January 13, 2008	Bridgetown	Antigua and Barbuda	3-2	Win	International friendly
?	March 13, 2008	Kingstown	Saint Vincent and the Grenadines	2-0	Win	International friendly
?	October 23, 2008	Havana	Suriname	3-2	Win	2008 Caribbean Championship
?	October 23, 2008	Havana	Suriname		Win	2008 Caribbean Championship
?	October 23, 2008	Havana	Suriname		Win	2008 Caribbean Championship
?	October 27, 2008	Havana	Netherlands Antilles	2-1	Win	2008 Caribbean Championship
?	October 8, 2010	Kingstown	Montserrat	5-0	Win	2010 Caribbean Championship
?	October 8, 2010	Kingstown	Montserrat	5-0	Win	2010 Caribbean Championship

== Honours ==
Youth Milan

- Barbados Premier League: 2006, 2011; runner-up 1999; third place 2002, 2004, 2010
- Barbados Division One: promoted 2018
- Barbados FA Cup: 2002, 2009; runner-up 2001

Notre Dame

- Barbados Premier League: 2008
- Barbados FA Cup: 2008
