= Ackeel Applewhaite =

Barbadian footballer

Personal information
- Date of birth: 17 July 1999 (age 27)
- Place of birth: Bridgetown, Barbados
- Height: 1.79 m (5 ft 10 in)
- Position: Midfielder

Team information
- Current team: Paradise

Youth career
- 2013: Benfica
- 2014–2017: Paradise

Senior career*
Years	Team	Apps	(Gls)
2017–2018	Hoppers	11	(2)
2018	Paradise	17	(4)
2018	Parham		
2019	Paradise	13	(2)
2019	Kemi Kings		
2020–	Paradise		

International career^{‡}
- Barbados U17
2018	Barbados U20	4	(0)
2017–	Barbados	53	(2)
- * Club domestic league appearances and goals as of 11:57, 14 June 2020 (UTC) ‡ National team caps and goals as of 11:57, 17 July 2026 (UTC)

Ackeel Applewhaite (born 17 July 1999) is a Bajan footballer who plays as a midfielder for Paradise and the Barbados national team.

== Career ==
Applewhaite first started playing football at St Giles Primary, before playing for club sides Benfica and Paradise. Trials at English sides Crystal Palace and Barnet followed, but due to work permit and funding issues, Applewhaite was unable to sign professionally with the latter.

Following spells with Antiguan sides Hoppers and Parham, as well as with boyhood club Paradise, Applewhaite spent time in Finland with Kemi Kings.

== Career statistics ==
=== Club ===
As of 14 June 2020

Appearances and goals by club, season and competition
Club	Season	League			Cup		Continental		Other		Total	
Club	Season	Division	Apps	Goals	Apps	Goals	Apps	Goals	Apps	Goals	Apps	Goals
Hoppers	2017–18	Antigua and Barbuda; Premier Division	11	2	0	0	–		0	0	11	2
Paradise	2018	Barbados Premier League	17	4	0	0	–		0	0	17	4
Paradise	2018–19	Barbados Premier League	13	2	0	0	–		0	0	13	2
Paradise	Total		30	6	0	0	0	0	0	0	30	6
Career total			41	8	0	0	0	0	0	0	41	8

=== International ===
As of matches played 29 March 2026

Appearances and goals by national team and year
National team	Year	Apps	Goals
Barbados	2017	4	0
Barbados	2018	9	0
Barbados	2019	9	1
Barbados	2020	2	0
Barbados	2021	4	0
Barbados	2022	9	0
Barbados	2023	4	0
Barbados	2024	8	0
Barbados	2025	2	1
Barbados	2026	2	0
Total		53	2

Scores and results list Barbados goal tally first, score column indicates score after each Applewhaite goal.

List of international goals scored by Ackeel Applewhaite
No.	Date	Venue	Opponent	Score	Result	Competition
1	6 March 2019	Victoria Park, Kingstown, Saint Vincent and the Grenadines	Saint Lucia	2–0	2–0	2019 Windward Islands Tournament
2	12 November 2025	Sir Vivian Richards Stadium, North Sound, Antigua and Barbuda	Bonaire	2–0	3–2	2025–26 CONCACAF Series
