= Roshon Gittens =

Barbadian footballer (born 2002)

Personal information
- Date of birth: 5 February 2002 (age 24)
- Place of birth: Bridgetown, Barbados
- Height: 1.69 m (5 ft 6 1/2 in)
- Position: Midfielder

Team information
- Current team: Ellerton

Youth career
- –2018: Notre Dame

Senior career*
Years	Team	Apps	(Gls)
2018–	Ellerton		

International career^{‡}
2018–	Barbados	2	(1)
- * Club domestic league appearances and goals ‡ National team caps and goals as of 17:27, 27 August 2021 (UTC)

Roshon Gittens (born 5 February 2002) is a Barbadian footballer who plays as a midfielder for Ellerton FC of the Barbados Premier League, and the Barbados national team.

== Club career ==
Gittens started off his career with Notre Dame SC before moving on to Ellerton FC in 2018. In April 2019 Gittens went on trial with FC DAC 1904 Dunajská Streda of the Slovak First Football League. In November 2020 he was scheduled to participate in trials in Europe again but was delayed because of the COVID-19 pandemic.

== International career ==
Gittens represented Barbados at the youth level at the 2018 CONCACAF U-20 Championship and the 2019 CONCACAF U-17 Championship. He captained his side at the 2018 tournament.

Gittens made his debut for the senior national team on 30 September 2018 in a friendly against Saint Vincent and the Grenadines at the age of 16. He was next called up to the senior squad for a friendly against Turks and Caicos on 19 March 2021. He went on to score his first senior international goal in the match, an eventual 2–0 victory. Two month later he was part of the Barbados squad for 2022 FIFA World Cup qualification but missed the matches through injury.

=== International goals ===
Scores and results list Barbados's goal tally first.

No	Date	Venue	Opponent	Score	Result	Competition
1.	19 March 2021	Cap Cana Sports City, Punta Cana, Dominican Republic	Turks and Caicos Islands	2–0	2–0	Friendly
Last updated 17 March 2019

=== International career statistics ===
As of match played 19 March 2021.

Barbados national team
Year	Apps	Goals
2018	1	0
2019	0	0
2020	0	0
2021	1	1
Total	2	1
