= Ranaldo Bailey =

Barbadian footballer

Personal information
- Full name: Ranaldo Antonio Bailey
- Date of birth: 5 July 1996 (age 30)
- Place of birth: Bridgetown, Barbados
- Height: 1.88 m (6 ft 2 in)
- Position: Defender

Youth career
- Pro-Shottas Soccer School

College career
Years	Team	Apps	(Gls)
2018–2019	USC Aiken		

Senior career*
Years	Team	Apps	(Gls)
2014	Pride of Gall Hill FC		
2015	UWI Blackbirds FC		
2015–2016	Morvant Caledonia United		
2016–2017	UWI Blackbirds FC		
2018	Barbados Defence Force Sports Program		

International career
2013	Barbados U17		
- Barbados U20
2014–2019	Barbados	28	(0)
- * Club domestic league appearances and goals

Ranaldo Antonio Bailey (born 5 July 1996) is a Barbadian footballer who plays as a defender for the Barbados national team. Bailey played collegiate soccer for USC Aiken.

== Career ==
=== Club career ===
Invited to the 2015 MLS Caribbean Combine, Bailey attracted the attention of Northern Ireland's Ballymena United, embarking on a trial there in April that year. However, when Ballymena offered him a contract, the defender rejected it, explaining that pecuniary conditions there did not satisfy him.

=== International career ===
At the youth level he played in the 2013 CONCACAF U-17 Championship.

== Personal life ==
He is the son of former footballer Horace Stoute.
