= 2018 Barbados Premier League =

Barbados Premier League
- Season: 2018
- Champions: Weymouth Wales
- Caribbean Club Shield: Weymouth Wales

The 2018 Barbados Premier League (officially the Digicel Premier League for sponsorship reasons) is the 72nd season of the highest tier of football in Barbados. The league season began on 11 March and ended on 8 July 2018.

== Format ==
The 12 teams were divided into two zones of six teams each. Each team played the other teams in their own zone twice and the teams in the other zone once, for a total of 16 matches. The teams who finished first in each zone played in the championship match for the title, while the teams finishing second in each zone played in the third place match. The teams who finished last in each zone were relegated, while the teams who finished fifth played over two matches with the loser also relegated.

== Teams change ==
Promoted from previous season

- Empire
- Silver Sands
- Porey Springs

Relegated from previous season

== Regular season ==
=== Zone 1 ===
Pos	Team	Pld	W	D	L	GF	GA	GD	Pts	Qualification or relegation
1	Weymouth Wales (C)	16	14	2	0	50	6	+44	44	Championship Final
2	Paradise	16	10	2	4	42	16	+26	32	Third Place Match
3	Brittons Hill	16	9	2	5	27	15	+12	29	
4	Empire	16	8	2	6	35	30	+5	26	
5	Notre Dame (O)	16	8	0	8	28	30	−2	24	Relegation Playoff
6	Silver Sands (R)	16	3	2	11	17	53	−36	11	Relegated

Source: RSSSF
Rules for classification: 1) points; 2) goal difference; 3) number of goals scored.
(C) Champions; (O) Play-off winners; (R) Relegated

=== Zone 2 ===
Pos	Team	Pld	W	D	L	GF	GA	GD	Pts	Qualification or relegation
1	Barbados Defence Force (BDF) (C)	16	11	2	3	39	10	+29	35	Championship Final
2	University of the West Indies	16	9	3	4	40	14	+26	30	Third Place Match
3	Ellerton	16	6	3	7	30	22	+8	21	
4	Porey Springs	16	1	6	9	22	50	−28	9	
5	Waterford Compton (R)	16	0	4	12	16	55	−39	4	Relegation Playoff
6	Rendezvous (Note: Rendezvous 12 points deducted) (R)	16	1	4	11	22	67	−45	−5	Relegated

Source: RSSSF
Rules for classification: 1) points; 2) goal difference; 3) number of goals scored.
(C) Champions; (R) Relegated

== Championship final ==
8 July 2018
08:00

Weymouth Wales	2–1	BDF
Harewood (penalty scored); Headley 38'	Official report 2nd report	Jules 31'

Wildey Turf, Bridgetown
Attendance: 2,000
Referee: Gillian Martindale

== Third-place match ==
8 July 2018
6:00

Paradise	2–3	UWI
Philips 13'; Lloyd 90+1'	Official report 2nd report	Worrell 66' 90+2'; Small 73'

Wildey Turf, Barbados
Referee: Norman Greaves

== Relegation playoff ==
=== First leg ===
5 Jul 2018
09:00

Waterford Compton	0–5	Notre Dame
	Report	Gale 9' 75'; Edmee 55' 86'; Cobgam 67'

Wildey Turf, Bridgetown, Barbados
Referee: Gillian Martindale

=== Second leg ===
8 Jul 2018

Notre Dame	10–1	Waterford Compton
Gale 24' 58' 58'; Edmee 27'; Clarke 32'; Skeete 34' 41'; Cobham 66' 69'; Grazette (o.g.)	Official report 2nd Report	Ramsey 70'

Wildey Turf, Bridgetown
Referee: Andrew Herbert

Waterford Compton relegated.
