= Romelle Burgess =

Barbadian international footballer (born 1982)

Personal information
- Date of birth: March 14, 1982 (age 44)
- Place of birth: Saint Michael, Barbados
- Height: 6 ft 1 in (1.85 m)
- Position: Midfielder

Youth career
- 2002–2005: Southern New Hampshire Penmen

Senior career*
Years	Team	Apps	(Gls)
2006–2007	New Hampshire Phantoms	34	(2)
2008–2009	Eden Stars		
2010	New Hampshire Phantoms	1	(0)
2013–	Paradise SC		

International career^{‡}
- Barbados U23
2000–	Barbados	30	(1)
- * Club domestic league appearances and goals as of 18:55, 7 August 2014 (UTC) ‡ National team caps and goals as of 18:55, 3 Sept. 2014 (UTC)

Romelle Burgess (born March 14, 1982) is a Barbadian international footballer who plays for Paradise SC.

== Career ==
=== College ===
Born in Saint Michael, Burgess moved to the United States in 2002 to attend Southern New Hampshire University, becoming just one of four college soccer players there to earn All-Conference honors four times.

=== Professional ===
Burgess turned professional in April 2006 when he signed for the New Hampshire Phantoms, then of the USL Second Division. After scoring two goals in 34 appearances, Burgess returned to his native Barbados, spending two seasons with the Eden Stars, before returning to the Phantoms for the 2010 season.

=== International ===
Burgess is a full international for the Barbadian national team, having made his debut in 2000. Burgess was a team member for the 2002 and 2010 FIFA World Cup qualifying campaigns.

Burgess has also represented Barbados at youth level, and is a former captain of the Barbadian national Under-23 team.

=== International goals ===
Scores and results list Barbados' goal tally first.

No	Date	Venue	Opponent	Score	Result	Competition
1.	3 September 2014	Stade Pierre-Aliker, Fort-de-France, Martinique	Suriname	1–0	1–1	2014 Caribbean Cup qualification
