= St. Andrew Lions FC =

Barbados football club

- Full name: St. Andrew Lions Football Club
- Founded: 2012
- Ground: Wildey Turf
- Capacity: 2,000
- Chairman: David King
- Manager: Christopher King
- League: Barbados First Division
- 2026: Barbados Premier League, 9th (relegated)
- Website: https://www.facebook.com/standrewlions

St. Andrew Lions FC is a Barbadian football club based in Belleplaine, Saint Andrew. As of 2019 it competes in the Barbados Premier League, the highest level of football in the nation.

== Domestic history ==
Key

Champion Runners-up 3rd Place

Season	League							Notes
Season	Div.	Pos.	Pl.	W	D	L	Pts.	Notes
2013	IV	4th, Zone 1	22	13	6	3	45	
2014	IV	1st, Zone 1	14	11	1	2	34	Promoted to Barbados Division Two
2015	III	1st, Zone 1	16	12	2	2	38	Promoted to Barbados Division One
2016	II	5th	24	8	10	6	34	
2017	II	6th	24	11	4	9	37	
2018	II	1st, Zone 1	15	8	4	3	28	Promoted to Barbados Premier League
2019	I	5th, Zone 2	16	6	2	8	20	
2020	I	N/A	7	1	4	2	7	League abandoned on 17 March because of COVID-19 pandemic
2021	I	Not held						
2022	I	Not held						
2023	I							
