= Ryan Lucas (Barbadian footballer) =

Barabadian footballer

Personal information
- Date of birth: 31 August 1977 (age 49)
- Place of birth: Bridgetown, Barbados
- Position: Forward

Senior career*
| Years | Team | Apps | (Gls) |
| 1997–1999 | Galway United | 27 | (4) |
| 2001 | Boston Bulldogs | 11 | (6) |
| 2002 | Cincinnati Riverhawks | 17 | (8) |
| 2002–2003 | Toronto Lynx | 34 | (7) |
| 2002 | → Mississauga Olympians (loan) | 3 | (1) |
| 2004–2008 | Notre Dame | | |

International career
| 2000–2007 | Barbados | 24 | (3) |
- * Club domestic league appearances and goals as of 27 December 2014

Ryan Lucas (born 31 August 1977) is a Barbadian footballer who played the majority of his career in North America and for the Barbados national football team.

== Playing career ==
Lucas began his career with Galway United in the League of Ireland Premier Division in 1997. In 2001, he played in the USL D-3 Pro League with the Boston Bulldogs, and scored 6 goals in 11 appearances. The following season he featured in the USL A-League with the Cincinnati Riverhawks, and recorded eight goals in 13 matches. For the remainder of the season he played for Toronto Lynx. After the 2002 season came to a conclusion he was loaned to the Mississauga Olympians of the Canadian Professional Soccer League; making his debut on September 6, 2002, in a match against North York Astros, and scored his first goal in a 2–1 defeat. In his two seasons with the Lynx he appeared in 34 matches and scored seven goals.

In 2004, he returned to his native Barbados to play with Notre Dame SC of the Barbados Premier Division. With Notre Dame his achievements were claiming the Barbados Premier Division championships in 2004, and 2005; as well as the Barbados FA Cup in 2004.

== International career ==
Lucas played for the Barbadian national team between 2000 and 2007, which included several FIFA World Cup qualifying matches.

== Honors ==
Notre Dame

- Barbados Premier Division: 2004, 2005
- Barbados FA Cup: 2004
