= Kirtney Franklyn =

Saint Vincent and the Grenadines footballer

Personal information
- Date of birth: 5 March 2005 (age 21)
- Place of birth: Saint Vincent and the Grenadines
- Position: Midfielder

Team information
- Current team: Britton's Hill United

Senior career*
| Years | Team | Apps | (Gls) |
| 2019–2026 | North Leeward Predators | | |
| 2026– | Britton's Hill United | | |

International career^{‡}
| 2024– | Saint Vincent and the Grenadines U20 | 3 | (2) |
| 2024– | Saint Vincent and the Grenadines | 20 | (4) |
- * Club domestic league appearances and goals as of 12:54, 30 May 2025 (UTC) ‡ National team caps and goals as of 00:15, 30 March 2026 (UTC)

Kirtney Franklyn (born 5 March 2005) is a Vincentian footballer who plays as a midfielder for Barbados Premier League club Britton's Hill United and the Saint Vincent and the Grenadines national team. A multi-sport athlete, he has also represented the nation internationally in cricket.

== Club career ==
As a youth, Franklyn played a number of sports and had to choose to focus on football or cricket. He had played for North Leeward Predators FC of the SVGFF Premier Division since at least 2019. In 2025, he was a member of the Predators squad that won the Premier League championship.

As a student at the St. Vincent and the Grenadines Community College, he was named the school's Most Promising Athlete in 2022. The following year, he was given the top honour, the Sports Personality of the Year Award, at the college's award ceremony.

For the 2026 season, Franklyn moved to Britton's Hill United FC of the Barbados Premier League. Early in the season, he scored a hat-trick in a 3–2 victory over Wotton FC. He later lead the offense in a 3–1 victory over Ellerton FC on matchday nine which saw Britton's Hill temporarily move to the top of the league table. On 17 May 2026, he scored seven goals in a league match against Wotton FC to raise his goal tally to eighteen at the top of the league's scoring charts. He finished the season as the league's Golden Boot winner, three goals ahead of Ellerton FC captain Shakille Belle who scored fifteen goals on the season.

== International career ==
Franklyn represented Saint Vincent and the Grenadines in football at the youth level. In October 2021, he was included in the provisional squad to compete in 2022 CONCACAF U-20 Championship qualifying. He was called up to the squad again in 2024 for 2024 CONCACAF U-20 Championship qualifying. During the latter campaign, Franklyn served as the team captain and scored goals against Trinidad and Tobago and Dominica. Saint Vincent and the Grenadines finished third in Group D, failing to qualify for the final tournament.

Franklyn made his senior international debut on 2 May 2024 in a friendly against Dominica. He scored his first senior international goal, the game-winner, in a friendly against Saint Kitts and Nevis on 20 May 2025 in preparation for upcoming 2026 FIFA World Cup qualifiers.

=== International goals ===
Scores and results list Saint Vincent and the Grenadines' goal tally first.

| No. | Date | Venue | Opponent | Score | Result | Competition |
|---|---|---|---|---|---|---|
| 1. | 20 May 2025 | Samuel Williams Sports Complex, Verchilds, Saint Kitts and Nevis | Saint Kitts and Nevis | 2–1 | 3–1 | Friendly |
| 2. | 29 May 2025 | Arnos Vale Stadium, Arnos Vale, Saint Vincent and the Grenadines | British Virgin Islands | 1–1 | 1–1 | Friendly |
| 3. | 4 June 2025 | Arnos Vale Stadium, Arnos Vale, Saint Vincent and the Grenadines | Anguilla | 6–0 | 6–0 | 2026 FIFA World Cup qualification |
| 4. | 29 March 2026 | Stadion Antonio Trenidat, Rincon, Bonaire | Barbados | 1–0 | 3–2 | 2025–26 CONCACAF Series |
Last updated 29 March 2026

=== International career statistics ===
As of match played 29 March 2026.

Saint Vincent and the Grenadines
| Year | Apps | Goals |
|---|---|---|
| 2024 | 7 | 0 |
| 2025 | 11 | 3 |
| 2026 | 2 | 1 |
| Total | 20 | 4 |

== Cricket ==
Franklyn represented Saint Vincent and Grenadines at the under-15, under-17 and under-19 levels, including at the Windward Islands Under-19 tournament. In 2022, he hit a century against the Reshawn Lewis Eleven in a practice match as a member of the national under-19 team. That year he was also the only SVG cricketers to be included in the Windward Islands U19 squad for the West Indies Rising Stars Under-19 Tournament.
