= Romario Harewood =

Barbadian footballer

Personal information
- Date of birth: 17 August 1994 (age 32)
- Place of birth: Saint James, Barbados
- Position: Midfielder

Team information
- Current team: Weymouth Wales
- Number: 10

Senior career*
Years	Team	Apps	(Gls)
2010–2011	Saint John's Sonnets		
2014–2016	Barbados Defence Force		(14)
2017–	Weymouth Wales		

International career^{‡}
2014–	Barbados	17	(3)
- * Club domestic league appearances and goals as of 21:46, 10 January 2017 (UTC) ‡ National team caps and goals as of 21:50, 24 March 2018 (UTC)

Romario Harewood (born 17 August 1994) is a Barbadian footballer who currently plays for Weymouth Wales FC of the Barbados Premier Division and the Barbados national team as a midfielder.

== Club career ==
From 2010 to 2011, Harewood played for Barbadian club St. John's Sonnets. Since 2014, he has played for Barbados Defense Force of the Barbados Premier Division. For the 2015 season, Harewood was the Premier Division's second highest scorer with 14 goals as BDF were crowned league champions.

In December 2015 he was one of two Barbadian players (alongside Jomo Harris) to be selected for the MLS Caribbean Combine in Martinique.

In January 2017 it was announced that Harewood had signed for Weymouth Wales FC.

== International career ==
Harewood was part of the U17 squad that participated in the 2011 CONCACAF U-17 Championship. He made his senior international debut for Barbados on 2 March 2014 in a friendly against Jamaica.

=== International goals ===
Score and result list Barbados's goal tally first.

#	Date	Venue	Opponent	Score	Result	Competition
1.	7 September 2014	Stade d'Honneur de Dillon, Fort-de-France, Martinique	Bonaire	2–0	4–1	2014 Caribbean Cup qualification
2.	8 March 2015	Barbados National Stadium, Bridgetown, Barbados	Saint Vincent and the Grenadines	2–1	2–2	Friendly
3.	23 March 2016	Usain Bolt Sports Complex, Cave Hill, Barbados	Curaçao	1–0	1–0	2017 Caribbean Cup qualification
Last updated 24 March 2016

== Personal ==
Harewood is the son of Bernard Howell, a Barbadian goalkeeper who has also played for Saint John's Sonnets.
