= Abiola Grant =

Barbadian footballer

Personal information
- Full name: Abiola Aman Kosay Grant
- Date of birth: 17 November 2002 (age 23)
- Place of birth: Bridgetown, Barbados
- Height: 1.78 m (5 ft 10 in)
- Position: Striker

Team information
- Current team: Inđija
- Number: 14

Senior career*
Years	Team	Apps	(Gls)
2017–2021	Empire Club	18	(4)
2021	Kazincbarcikai	0	(0)
2021–2022	Radnički Sremska Mitrovica	0	(0)
2022	Brežice 1919	1	(0)
2023	Solin	0	(0)
2023–2024	Inđija	0	(0)

International career^{‡}
2019	Barbados U17	2	(0)
- * Club domestic league appearances and goals as of 13:56, 3 September 2026 (UTC) ‡ National team caps and goals as of 27 February 2023

Abiola Grant (born 17 November 2002) is a Barbadian footballer who most recently played as a midfielder for Inđija of Serbia's First League.

== Club career ==
Grant began playing football at age 5. He came up through the ranks of Pro Shottas Football Club and won the Barbados Cup with the team. Domestically, Grant began his senior career with Empire Club of the Barbados Premier League in 2017 while he was still a student at the The Alexandra School.

In 2018 he attended a week-long camp with Boca Juniors in Argentina. In April 2019 he went on trial with FC DAC 1904 Dunajská Streda of the Slovak Super Liga. He was set to return to Europe for more trials in November 2020 but could not because of the ongoing COVID-19 pandemic.

In February 2021, Grant went on a two-week trial with Kazincbarcikai SC of the Hungarian Nemzeti Bajnokság II. The following month it was announced that he had signed for the club for the remainder of the 2020–21 season. He made his debut for the club in a friendly with DVTK on 26 March 2021. Following the season, Kazincbarcikai was relegated to the Nemzeti Bajnokság III and Grant left the club. Following a series of trials and offers from other clubs in Hungary, he joined FK Radnički Sremska Mitrovica of the Serbian First League, the second tier of football in Serbia, on transfer deadline day in late August 2021.

In January 2022 Grant joined Brežice 1919 of the Slovenian Second League and appeared in a training match against NK Rudar Velenje. He made his league debut for the club as a late substitute against NK Dob on 10 April 2022. His contract was later extended to 30 May 2023.

In January 2023 Grant moved to NK Solin of Croatia's First League on a professional contract for the remainder of the 2022–23 season.

== International career ==
Grant has represented Barbados at the U15, U17, and U20 levels. He made two appearances for the under-17 team in the 2019 CONCACAF U-17 Championship. By March 2021 he had scored seven total youth international goals for his country.

== Personal ==
Following his stints in Europe, Grant returned to Barbados. In June 2026, he was arrested for possession of twenty-three rounds of ammunition and was remanded to the Barbados Prison Service.
