= Tajio James =

Barbadian footballer

Personal information
- Full name: Tajio Ricardo J. James
- Date of birth: 17 December 2003 (age 22)
- Place of birth: Bridgetown, Barbados
- Height: 1.67 m (5 ft 6 in)
- Position: Midfielder

Team information
- Current team: Veria 1960

College career
Years	Team	Apps	(Gls)
2021–2022	Feather River Golden Eagles	40	(41)
2023–2024	Central Arkansas Bears	32	(8)

Senior career*
Years	Team	Apps	(Gls)
2020–2021	UWI Blackbirds		
2024	Houston FC	10	(2)
2025–2026	NK Varaždin	0	(0)
2025	→ NK Bjelovar (loan)	9	(0)
2026	→ NK Radnik Križevci (loan)	9	(0)
2026–	Veria 1960	3	(0)

International career^{‡}
2022–	Barbados	15	(5)
- * Club domestic league appearances and goals as of 03:27, 24 January 2026 (UTC) ‡ National team caps and goals as of 18:05, 24 January 2026 (UTC)

Tajio James (born 17 December 2003) is a Barbadian footballer who plays as a midfielder for Veria 1960 of the Gamma Ethniki, and the Barbados national team.

== Club career ==
As a youth James was part of the KFC Pinelands Football Academy and Pro Shottas United. With the latter he won a number of youth titles. For the 2020 Barbados Premier League season he was part of the youth movement at UWI Blackbirds FC. He scored his first two Premier League goals on 3 March 2020 in a 4–0 victory over Brittons Hill FC.

In August 2021 it was announced that James and fellow-Barbadian Devonte Richards had received a scholarship to play college soccer in the United States for the Golden Eagles of Feather River College. During his first season with the team, James tallied nine assists and a team-high thirteen goals as Feather River College won the CCCAA Golden Valley Conference Championship. Late in the season he was leading the conference in both goals and points. Following his sophomore season, James was named to the second team of the United Soccer Coaches 2022 Junior College Division III All-America Team.

In April 2023 it was announced that James had transferred to NCAA Division I school Central Arkansas University to play for the Bears. He joined Houston FC of the USL League Two for the 2024 season. James made ten appearances for the club, scoring two goals, throughout the season.

Following graduation from Central Arkansas, James signed for NK Varaždin of the Croatian Football League, the top-flight league in Croatia, on a three-year deal. The signing culminated a summer trial with the club which included a goal in a friendly with Hungarian club Paksi FC. In September 2025, the player was loaned out to NK Bjelovar of the Second League.

In September 2026, it was announced that James arrived in Greece for a trial with Veria 1960 FC. Shortly thereafter, the signing was officially announced.

== International career ==
James represented Barbados as a youth at the U15 and U17 levels, including three appearances in the 2019 CONCACAF U-17 Championship. He received his first senior call-up by head coach Russell Latapy in February 2021. He was called up again for the 2022–23 CONCACAF Nations League B. James went on to make his senior international debut on 2 June 2022 in Barbados's opening match against Antigua and Barbuda.

James scored his first senior international goal in a 1–1 friendly draw with Grenada on 22 February 2023. Two days later he scored two more goals in another draw with the same opponent.

=== International goals ===
Scores and results list Barbados's goal tally first.

No.	Date	Venue	Opponent	Score	Result	Competition
1.	22 February 2023	Fond Playing Field, Sauteurs, Grenada	Grenada	1–1	1–1	Friendly
2.	24 February 2023	Kirani James Athletic Stadium St. George's, Grenada	Grenada	1–0	2–2	Friendly
3.	24 February 2023	Kirani James Athletic Stadium St. George's, Grenada	Grenada	2–1	2–2	Friendly
4.	26 March 2023	Sir Vivian Richards Stadium, North Sound, Antigua and Barbuda	Antigua and Barbuda	2–1	2–1	2022–23 CONCACAF Nations League B
5.	20 November 2023	Blakes Estate Stadium, Lookout, Montserrat	Montserrat	2–4	2–4	2023–24 CONCACAF Nations League B
Last updated 20 November 2023

=== International career statistics ===
As of match played 10 June 2025.

Barbados
Year	Apps	Goals
2022	4	0
2023	7	5
2024	2	0
2025	2	0
Total	15	5
