= Jomo Harris =

Barbadian footballer

Personal information
- Date of birth: 15 February 1995 (age 31)
- Place of birth: Eden Lodge, Barbados
- Height: 1.73 m (5 ft 8 in)
- Position: Midfielder

Team information
- Current team: Kemi Kings

College career
Years	Team	Apps	(Gls)
2017	Arizona Western College	21	(3)

Senior career*
Years	Team	Apps	(Gls)
2013–2014	Paradise		
2015–2018	UWI Blackbirds		
2018	Paradise		
2019–	Kemi Kings	0	(0)

International career^{‡}
2015–	Barbados	22	(2)
- * Club domestic league appearances and goals as of 20:30, 20 June 2019 (UTC) ‡ National team caps and goals as of 13:33, 12 April 2019 (UTC)

Jomo Harris (born 15 February 1995) is a Barbadian international footballer who plays for Kemi Kings, as a midfielder.

== Career ==
Born in Eden Lodge, he has played club football for Paradise and UWI Blackbirds, and college soccer in the United States for Arizona Western College. In December 2015 he was one of two Barbadian players (alongside Romario Harewood) to be selected for the MLS Caribbean Combine in Martinique.

He made his international debut for Barbados in 2015.

In April 2019, Jomo joined Finnish club Palloseura Kemi Kings.
