= BDF F.C. =

BDF F.C. may refer to:

- Barbados Defence Force FC
- Belize Defence Force FC
