= Digicel Premier League =

Two professional football leagues are known as the Digicel Premier League for marketing purposes:

- The National Premier League in Jamaica
- The Barbados Premier Division
