= Barry Skeete =

Barbadian footballer (born 1984)

Personal information
- Full name: Barry Omar Wendell Skeete
- Date of birth: 18 January 1984 (age 42)
- Place of birth: Bridgetown, Barbados
- Position: Defender

Team information
- Current team: Paradise

Senior career*
Years	Team	Apps	(Gls)
–2004	BDFSP		
2005–2008	Colegiales	18	(1)
2008–2009	Sportivo Barracas		
2009–2013	BDFSP		
2014–	Paradise		

International career
2008–2014	Barbados	38	(2)
- * Club domestic league appearances and goals

Barry Omar Wendell Skeete (born 18 January 1984) is a Barbadian footballer who plays as a defender for Paradise.

== Career ==
In 2005, Skeete signed for Argentine fourth tier side Colegiales and later signed for Paradise on 1 January 2014
