= Scott Colcombe =

English footballer

Personal information
- Full name: Scott Colcombe
- Date of birth: 15 December 1971 (age 54)
- Place of birth: West Bromwich, England
- Positions: Midfielder; left back

Youth career
- 198?–1990: West Bromwich Albion

Senior career*
Years	Team	Apps	(Gls)
1990–1991	West Bromwich Albion	0	(0)
1991–1995	Torquay United	89	(1)
1995–1997	Doncaster Rovers	41	(4)
1997–1998	Telford United		
1998–????	Stourbridge		
????–2000	Blakenall		
2000–2002	Redditch United		
2002–20??	Willenhall Town		
2008	Chasetown	0	(0)
- * Club domestic league appearances and goals

Scott Colcombe (born 15 December 1971) is an English former professional footballer.

Colcombe began his career as an apprentice with his local side West Bromwich Albion, turning professional in July 1990. He was released without making his league debut at the end of the following season, joining Torquay United in August 1991. He made his debut on the opening day of the following season, playing in Torquay's 3–1 win at home to Hartlepool United. He played in the following game, a 3–0 defeat away to Preston North End, but was substituted and replaced by Paul Holmes for the next game. He established himself in the second half of the season, but was only on the bench as the 1992–93 season began. Three games into the season he dislodged Arron Davis from the Torquay side and had a run in the side at left-back. He began the following season as first choice at left-back in the Torquay side and played 27 times as Torquay reached the play-offs, losing in controversial circumstances against Preston North End. He played just ten times in the 1994–95 season, kept out of the Torquay side by Scott Stamps and then Gregory Goodridge, and was released at the end of the season.

He joined Doncaster Rovers, along with fellow Torquay players Duane Darby and Darren Moore, on a free transfer in July 1995. His two seasons at Doncaster were plagued by injuries and he was released in May 1997 having played only 42 times (scoring 3 goals) for Rovers. He joined Telford United on 18 July 1997, but struggled to establish himself in their Conference side. He moved on to Stourbridge on a free transfer the following summer and then to Blakenall during the 1999–2000 season. In June 2000, he left Blakenall to join Redditch United and despite being linked with Bromsgrove Rovers the following close season remained with Redditch for the start of the 2001–02 season. He was revealed to be involved with Sky Sports presenter and Torquay United fan Helen Chamberlain in September 2001.

He was released by Redditch in January 2002 and joined Willenhall Town the following week. He struggled with injuries over an 18-month spell, but returned to the side for the start of the 2004–05 season.

After a series of injuries he attempted to resume his football career and played one cup game for Chasetown in the 2007–08 season.
