= Jabarry Chandler =

Barbadian international footballer

Personal information
- Full name: Jabarry Jesse Chandler
- Date of birth: 11 April 1994 (age 32)
- Place of birth: Barbados
- Position: Forward

Team information
- Current team: Paradise

Senior career*
Years	Team	Apps	(Gls)
2012–15	Pride of Gall Hill		
2015–	Paradise		

International career
2010–2011	Barbados Under 17s	6	(5)
2014–	Barbados	4	(1)
- * Club domestic league appearances and goals

Jabarry Jesse Chandler (born 11 April 1994) is a Barbadian international footballer who plays as a forward for Paradise.

== International career ==
Jabarry Chandler was first called up by the Barbados Under 17 squad in 2010 for their match against Grenada Under 17s. Chandler started and scored in 2 goals. He then went on to score 6 more goals in the next 7 matches. Although Barbados Under 17's didn't qualify for the U17 World Cup, Chandler was the top scorer in the entire Concacaf region during qualifying, with 8 goals.

In 2014 Chandler made his first appearance for the Senior Barbados team against Jamaica in a 2–0 loss. He didn't play another game that year, but in 2015 he made 3 more appearances for the Barbados Men's team, scoring his first senior goal for Barbados against US Virgin Islands in a 4-0 World Cup Qualifying win.

=== International goals ===
Scores and results list the Barbados's goal tally first.

#	Date	Venue	Opponent	Score	Result	Competition
1.	26 March 2015	Addelita Cancryn Junior High School Ground, Charlotte Amalie, United States Virgin Islands	U.S. Virgin Islands	4–0	4–0	2018 FIFA World Cup qualification
