= Mario Harte =

Barbadian footballer (born 1988)

Personal information
- Date of birth: 30 August 1988 (age 38)
- Place of birth: Barbados
- Position: Midfielder

Team information
- Current team: Paradise

Senior career*
Years	Team	Apps	(Gls)
2007–2014	Defence Force		(62)
2015–2022	Blackbirds	39	(74)
2023–	Paradise		(6)

International career^{‡}
- Barbados U17
- Barbados U20
2008–	Barbados	54	(15)
- * Club domestic league appearances and goals ‡ National team caps and goals as of 6 March 2019

Mario Harte (born 30 August 1988) is a Barbadian international footballer who plays as a midfielder. He is currently playing for Paradise. He was the top scorers during the 2016 Barbados Premier Division season.

== International career ==
=== International goals ===
Scores and results list the Barbados's goal tally first.

#	Date	Venue	Opponent	Score	Result	Competition
1.	8 February 2009	Barbados National Stadium, Bridgetown	Grenada	3–0	5–0	Friendly
2.	26 September 2010	Barbados National Stadium, Bridgetown	Dominica	1–0	1–3	Friendly
3.	27 September 2012	Barbados National Stadium, Bridgetown	Aruba	2–1	2–1	2012 Caribbean Cup qualification
4.	7 September 2014	Stade Municipal Pierre-Aliker, Fort-de-France	Bonaire	3–0	4–1	2014 Caribbean Cup qualification
5.	7 September 2014	Stade Municipal Pierre-Aliker, Fort-de-France	Bonaire	4–0	4–1	2014 Caribbean Cup qualification
6.	11 October 2014	Stade Sylvio Cator, Port-au-Prince	Haiti	1–2	2–4	2014 Caribbean Cup qualification
7.	2 February 2015	Barbados National Stadium, Bridgetown	Guyana	2–2	2–2	Friendly
8.	26 March 2015	Addelita Cancryn Junior High School Ground, Charlotte Amalie	U.S. Virgin Islands	3–0	4–0	2018 FIFA World Cup qualification
9.	10 May 2015	Usain Bolt Sports Complex, Bridgetown	Saint Kitts and Nevis	1–1	1–3	Friendly
10.	28 August 2015	Arnos Vale Stadium, Kingstown	Saint Vincent and the Grenadines	1–2	2–2	Friendly
11.	28 August 2015	Arnos Vale Stadium, Kingstown	Saint Vincent and the Grenadines	2–2	2–2	Friendly
12.	4 July 2017	Kirani James Athletic Stadium, St. George's	Saint Vincent and the Grenadines	2–1	2–4	2017 Windward Islands Tournament
13.	6 July 2017	Kirani James Athletic Stadium, St. George's	Grenada	2–0	2–0	2017 Windward Islands Tournament
14.	18 November 2018	Wildey Astro Turf, Wildey	U.S. Virgin Islands	3–0	3–0	2019–20 CONCACAF Nations League qualification
15.	6 March 2019	Victoria Park, Kingstown	Saint Lucia	1–0	2–0	2019 Windward Islands Tournament
