= Hadan Holligan =

Barbadian footballer

Personal information
- Full name: Hadan Holligan
- Date of birth: 16 October 1995 (age 31)
- Place of birth: Saint James, Barbados
- Height: 1.72 m (5 ft 8 in)
- Positions: Midfielder; attacking midfielder

Team information
- Current team: Weymouth Wales
- Number: 9

Youth career
- Barbados Soccer Academy

Senior career*
Years	Team	Apps	(Gls)
2014–2015	Notre Dame SC	?	(?)
2015–	Weymouth Wales	52	(20)

International career^{‡}
2015–	Barbados	45	(5)
- * Club domestic league appearances and goals ‡ National team caps and goals as of 2 July 2021

Hadan Holligan (born 16 October 1995) is a Barbadian association footballer who currently plays for Weymouth Wales in the Barbados Premier Division and for the Barbados national team. Holligan also played for Sporting Kristina in 2016 and Hoppers FC in 2017.

== Career ==
After signing for Barbados Premier Division club Weymouth Wales, Holligan was soon called up to the Barbados national team for a friendly against Guyana. The next game - another friendly, against Saint Vincent and the Grenadines, he scored his first goal in a 2–2 draw. His next goal came during the 2018 World Cup qualifying in the second round, second leg win over Aruba. However, a prior yellow card accumulation meant he should not have been in that match at all (Note: FIFA awarded Aruba a 3–0 win as a result of Barbados fielding the ineligible player Hadan Holligan. Holligan failed to serve an automatic one match suspension for receiving two yellow cards earlier in the competition. The match originally ended 1–0 to Barbados.). As a result, Barbados' victory and advancement were overturned.

=== International goals ===
Scores and results list Barbados' goal tally first.

No.	Date	Venue	Opponent	Score	Result	Competition
1	8 March 2015	Barbados National Stadium, St. Michael, Barbados	Saint Vincent and the Grenadines	2–1	2–2	Friendly
2	14 June 2015	Usain Bolt Sports Complex, Cave Hill, Barbados	Aruba	1–0	1–0	2018 FIFA World Cup qualification
3.	4 July 2017	Kirani James Athletic Stadium, St. George's, Grenada	Saint Vincent and the Grenadines	1–0	2–4	2017 Windward Islands Tournament
4.	18 November 2018	Wildey Astro Turf, Wildey, Barbados	U.S. Virgin Islands	1–0	3–0	2019–20 CONCACAF Nations League qualification
5.	2 July 2021	DRV PNK Stadium, Fort Lauderdale, United States	Bermuda	1–4	1–8	2021 CONCACAF Gold Cup qualification
