= Jason Boxhill =

Barbadian footballer

Personal information
- Date of birth: 21 May 1983 (age 43)
- Place of birth: Oistins, Barbados
- Height: 1.83 m (6 ft 0 in)
- Position: Goalkeeper

Team information
- Current team: Paradise FC

Senior career*
Years	Team	Apps	(Gls)
2005–2021	Paradise FC	29+	(0+)

International career^{‡}
2004–2018	Barbados	26	(0)
- * Club domestic league appearances and goals ‡ National team caps and goals as of 25 March 2021

Jason Boxhill (born 21 May 1983) is a Barbadian footballer who plays for Paradise FC and the Barbados national football team.

== Career ==
=== International ===
Boxhill made his senior international debut on 11 January 2004, coming on as a 48th-minute substitute for Bernard Howell in a 2-0 friendly victory over Grenada.

== Career statistics ==
=== International ===
As of matches played 20 August 2018.

National team	Year	Apps	Goals
Bahamas	2004	2	0
Bahamas	2005	4	0
Bahamas	2011	9	0
Bahamas	2012	4	0
Bahamas	2014	3	0
Bahamas	2017	2	0
Bahamas	2018	2	0
Total		26	0
