= Romell Brathwaite =

Barbadian footballer

Personal information
- Date of birth: 18 March 1982 (age 44)
- Place of birth: Barbados
- Position: Defender

Team information
- Current team: Notre Dame

Senior career*
Years	Team	Apps	(Gls)
2004–	Notre Dame		

International career
2003–2008	Barbados	21	(0)
- * Club domestic league appearances and goals as of 14 May 2011

Romell Brathwaite (born 18 March 1982) is a Barbadian international footballer who plays for Notre Dame, as a defender.

== Career ==
Brathwaite played for the Barbadian national team between 2003 and 2008, which included three FIFA World Cup qualifying matches.
