= Bagatelle FC =

- Full name: Bagatelle Football Club
- Founded: 1997; 29 years ago
- Ground: Wildey Turf
- Capacity: 2,000
- Manager: Norman Forde
- League: Barbados Premier League
- 2026: 8th
- Website: Website

Bagatelle FC is a Barbadian football club based in Bagatelle, Saint Thomas that currently competes in the Barbados Premier League, the top tier of football in Barbados. The football section is part of the larger Bagatelle Sports and Social Club.

== History ==
Under first-year head coach and former Barbados international Norman Forde, Bagatelle FC finished second in the Division One in 2025. As runners-up, the club was promoted to the Barbados Premier League for the 2026 season. In the opening match of the season, the club lost 0–2 against defending champions Weymouth Wales. Bagatelle finished the season in eighth place in the standing with striker Torian Joseph tied for third-place in the league scoring race with thirteen goals.
