= Elvis Defreitas =

Barbadian footballer

Personal information
- Date of birth: 20 January 1981 (age 45)

Team information
- Current team: Croydon

Senior career*
Years	Team	Apps	(Gls)
2009–2013	Guildford City	136	(0)
2013	Chipstead		
2013–14	Guildford City	34	(0)
2014–	Croydon		

International career^{‡}
2005–	Barbados	16	(0)
- * Club domestic league appearances and goals as of 22 November 2014 ‡ National team caps and goals as of 13 July 2010

Elvis Defreitas (born 20 January 1981) is an international football player from Barbados. Defreitas currently plays for English Southern Counties East League side Croydon

He previously spent two spells at Guildford City F.C. between 2009 and 2013 and in 2014. Defreitas also played briefly for Chipstead FC in 2013.
