= The Alexandra School =

School in Barbados

Coordinates: 13.097402°N 59.608828°W

The Alexandra School, affectionately known as the "Beacon of the North", is a secondary school in Speightstown, in the Saint Peter district of the Caribbean island of Barbados.

In 2009, the school placed its first student into the USA Campus of the United World Colleges. Dereck Alleyne was placed into the United World College-USA (Montezuma).
