= UWI Blackbirds =

- University: University of the West Indies at Cave Hill
- Conference: Various
- Location: Cave Hill, Saint Michael, Barbados
- Varsity teams: 13
- Basketball arena: UWI Basketball Court
- Soccer stadium: Usain Bolt Sports Complex
- Website: www.cavehill.uwi.edu/sport/home.aspx

The UWI Blackbirds or Cave Hill Blackbirds are the official athletic teams of the University of the West Indies at Cave Hill.

== Sports ==
The following thirteen sports are offered.

- Aerobics
- Basketball
- Chess
- Cricket
- Football (soccer)
- Hockey (field hockey)
- Lawn Tennis
- Netball
- Swimming
- Table Tennis
- Taekwondo
- Track and Field
- Volleyball

== Football ==
The football team plays in the Barbados Premier Division, the top flight of football on the island.

== See also ==
- University of the West Indies
