= Luis Armelio Garcia =

Cuban football manager (born 1967)

Personal information
- Date of birth: 21 September 1967 (age 59)
- Place of birth: Cuba
- Position: Defender

Managerial career
- Years: Team
- 2004–2005: Cuba
- 2006–2008: Haiti
- 2009: L'Aiglon
- 2013: Victory SC
- 2013–2016: L'Aiglon
- 2017: Golden Lion

Luis Armelio Garcia (born 21 September 1967) is a Cuban former football manager and player.

== Early life ==
Garcia was born in 1967 in Cuba. He played as a defender. He captained the Cuba national team.

== Career ==
In 2004, Garcia was appointed manager of the Cuba national team. In 2006, he was appointed manager of the Haiti national football team. He helped the team win the 2007 Caribbean Cup. In 2009, he was appointed manager of Martinique side L'Aiglon. In 2013, he was appointed manager of Haitian side Victory SC. After that, he returned to Martinique side L'Aiglon. In 2017, he was appointed manager of Martinique side Golden Lion.

== Managerial style ==
Garcia has been described as a "whimsical character".

== Personal life ==
Garcia is a native of Santiago de Cuba, Cuba. He has been married to a Guadeloupean woman.
