= Zé Luiz (footballer, born 1974) =

Footballer (born 1974)

Personal information
- Full name: José Luiz Seabra Filho
- Date of birth: 25 January 1974 (age 52)
- Place of birth: Bauru, Brazil
- Height: 1.68 m (5 ft 6 in)
- Position: Midfielder

Senior career*
Years	Team	Apps	(Gls)
- Noroeste
- Botafogo-SP
- W Connection
- Ferroviária Araraquara

International career
2005	Trinidad and Tobago	6	(0)
- * Club domestic league appearances and goals

José Luiz Seabra Filho (born 25 January 1974), simply known as Zé Luiz, is a former professional footballer who played as a midfielder. Born in Brazil, he made six appearances for the Trinidad and Tobago national team.

== Club career ==
Zé Luiz was born in Bauru, Brazil.

He signed for W Connection in 2000. His previous clubs include Noroeste and Botafogo-SP.

== International career ==
Zé Luiz made his debut for the Trinidad and Tobago national team in January 2005 in a friendly against Azerbaijan. However, he was unable to feature for Trinidad and Tobago at the 2006 World Cup because he did not gain full citizenship in time.
