= Gregory Goodridge =

Barbadian footballer (born 1971)

Personal information
- Full name: Gregory Ronald St Clair Goodridge
- Date of birth: 10 July 1971 (age 55)
- Place of birth: Barbados
- Positions: Defender; midfielder

Team information
- Current team: Brittons Hill

Senior career*
Years	Team	Apps	(Gls)
1992–1993	Lambada		
1994–1995	Torquay United	38	(4)
1995–1996	Queens Park Rangers	7	(1)
1996–2001	Bristol City	120	(14)
2001	→Cheltenham Town (loan)	11	(1)
2001–2002	Torquay United	17	(1)
2002–2004	Ellerton United	?	(25)
2005–2012	Brittons Hill United	?	(31)
2013–2016	Rendezvous	?	(3)
2017	Ellerton United	?	(2)

International career
1992–2008	Barbados	63	(16)
- * Club domestic league appearances and goals

Gregory Ronald St Clair Goodridge (born 10 July 1971) is a Barbadian former professional footballer. He has captained the Barbados national team and played professionally in the English Football League.

== Club career ==
Nicknamed Lalu, Goodridge, a pacy winger, signed an 18-month contract with Torquay United on 7 February 1994, but due to work permit problems had to wait until 24 March to complete his signing from Barbados side Lambada F.C. the same team that Torquay United manager Don O'Riordan would return to a year later to sign Rodney Jack. O'Riordan was notified about Goodridge and Jack by the Lambada English coach Kevin Millard who later sent other talented players from the Caribbean to O'Riordan during his years as manager in Ireland with Galway United FC and Sligo Rovers FC.

He made his debut as a substitute in the 1–1 draw away to Bury and soon dislodged Scott Colcombe from the side, playing eight times that season, scoring once. He became both a regular and a crowd favourite the following year with his runs with the ball and occasional long-range shooting. He moved to Queens Park Rangers in August 1995 for a fee of £250,000, but struggled to settle at Loftus Road, only appearing in the league as a substitute on seven occasions, scoring once.

In August 1996 he moved to Bristol City for £50,000 and became a regular in their side. He played a major role in the Robins 1997/98 promotion success, scoring stunning goals in home wins against Preston and Burnley. He lost his place in the 2000–01 season, and joined Cheltenham Town on loan on 23 February until the end of the season, when he returned to Ashton Gate and continued to try to win a place in Danny Wilson's side. In November 2001 he returned to Torquay United on a free transfer, signing a contract until the end of the season, but his second spell at Plainmoor was less successful than the first and he was released at the end of the season.

Subsequently, he returned to Barbados to play for Ellerton United F.C. and is currently player coach at Brittons Hill United F C where he won the 2009 Premier league.
