= Barbados FA Cup =

Football tournament

The Barbados FA Cup is the top knockout tournament of the Barbado football. It is run by the Barbados Football Association. It was founded in 1910 and has been running ever since.

== Winners ==
- 1910 : Kensington Rovers
- 1911 : Kensington Rovers
- 1912 : Kensington Rovers and Harrison College (shared)
- 1913 : Harrison College
- 1914 : Kensington Rovers
- 1915 : Kensington Rovers
- 1916 : Kensington Rovers
- 1917 : Kensington Rovers
- 1918 : Kensington Rovers
- 1919 : Kensington Rovers
- 1920 : Harrison College
- 1921 : Kensington Rovers
- 1922 : Kensington Rovers
- 1923 : Harrison College
- 1924 : Empire
- 1925 : Empire
- 1926 : Empire
- 1927 : Spartan
- 1928 : Empire
- 1947–48 : Everton
- 1949 : Spartan
- 1950 : Spartan
- 1952 : Carlton
- 1960 : Everton
- 1962 : Everton
- 1967 : New South Wales 5–0 Spartans
- 1969 : New South Wales
- 1970 : New South Wales
- 1972 : New South Wales
- 1975 : New South Wales
- 1982 : Notre Dame
- 1984 : Weymouth Wales
- 1986 : Everton bt Pinelands
- 1987 : Weymouth Wales
- 1989 : Pinelands bt COW All Stars
- 1990 : Everton bt Paradise
- 1993 : Pride of Gall Hill bt Weymouth Wales
- 1994 : BDF
- 1995 : Pride of Gall Hill 5–1 Benfica
- 1996 : Paradise bt BDF
- 1997 : Notre Dame 1–0 Paradise
- 1998 : Pride of Gall Hill 1–0 Notre Dame
- 1999 : Paradise bt Pride of Gall Hill
- 2000 : Paradise 2–1 Notre Dame
- 2001 : Notre Dame 1–0 Youth Milan FC
- 2002 : Youth Milan 2–1 Notre Dame
- 2003 : Paradise 1–0 Weymouth Wales (asdet)
- 2004 : Notre Dame 3–2 Silver Sands
- 2005 : Paradise 3–1 BDF
- 2006 : Pride of Gall Hill 2–1 Paradise (a.e.t.)
- 2007 : Brittons Hill 5–1 Eden Stars
- 2008 : Notre Dame 2–1 BDF
- 2009 : Youth Milan FC 2–1 Paradise (a.e.t.)
- 2010 : Notre Dame 4–0 Ellerton
- 2011 : Weymouth Wales 1–0 Saint Peter's Cosmos
- 2012 : BDF 4–3 Brittons Hill (a.e.t.)
- 2013 : Rendezvous 6–1 Brittons Hill
- 2014 : Weymouth Wales 1–0 BDF
- 2015 : BDF 2–1 Rendezvous
- 2016: Weymouth Wales 4–1 Rendezvous (a.e.t.)
- 2017 : Weymouth Wales 1–0 Paradise
- 2018 : Paradise 2–1 BDF
- 2019: Weymouth Wales 2–1 BDF
- 2020–22: Not held
- 2023: Weymouth Wales 1–0 Ellerton
