= Shandel Samuel =

Vincentian footballer (born 1982)

Personal information
- Date of birth: 14 December 1982 (age 43)
- Place of birth: Layou, St. Vincent
- Height: 5 ft 11 in (1.80 m)
- Position: Striker

Team information
- Current team: Rendezvous FC

Youth career
- System 3 FC

Senior career*
Years	Team	Apps	(Gls)
2001–2005	System 3 FC	?	(?)
2005	Negri Sembilan FA	?	(?)
2005	Kedah FA	?	(?)
2005–2006	Negri Sembilan FA	?	(?)
2006–2007	North East Stars	20	(8)
2007–2008	San Juan Jabloteh	11	(1)
2009–2012	Ma Pau SC	?	(?)
2013–2017	Rendezvous FC	?	(31)

International career^{‡}
2001–2016	St. Vincent & the Grenadines	63	(32)
- * Club domestic league appearances and goals ‡ National team caps and goals as of 4 November 2015

Shandel Samuel (born 14 December 1982) is a Vincentian footballer who currently plays for Barbadian side Rendezvous FC as a striker. He was formerly the all-time top scorer of the Saint Vincent and the Grenadines national team.

== International career ==
Samuel made his international debut as an 18-year-old in 2001. He scored 10 goals at the 2007 Caribbean Cup and a further five goals at the 2010 Caribbean Championship.

== Career statistics ==
=== International ===
Appearances and goals by national team and year
National team	Year	Apps	Goals
Saint Vincent and the Grenadines	2001	3	2
Saint Vincent and the Grenadines	2004	14	8
Saint Vincent and the Grenadines	2005	1	0
Saint Vincent and the Grenadines	2006	9	11
Saint Vincent and the Grenadines	2007	3	1
Saint Vincent and the Grenadines	2008	5	0
Saint Vincent and the Grenadines	2010	4	5
Saint Vincent and the Grenadines	2011	8	1
Saint Vincent and the Grenadines	2012	6	2
Saint Vincent and the Grenadines	2013	2	0
Saint Vincent and the Grenadines	2014	2	1
Saint Vincent and the Grenadines	2015	2	1
Saint Vincent and the Grenadines	2016	2	1
Total		61	33

Scores and results list Saint Vincent and the Grenadines' goal tally first, score column indicates score after each Samuel goal.

List of international goals scored by Shandel Samuel
No.	Date	Venue	Opponent	Score	Result	Competition	Ref.
1	14 March 2001	Arnos Vale Stadium, Kingstown, Saint Vincent and the Grenadines	Dominica	–	2–0	Friendly	
2	16 March 2001	Arnos Vale Stadium, Kingstown, Saint Vincent and the Grenadines	Grenada	1–0	1–1	Friendly	
3	23 May 2004	Warner Park Sporting Complex, Basseterre, Saint Kitts and Nevis	Saint Kitts and Nevis	2–2	2–3	Friendly	
4	13 June 2004	Estadio Cacique Diriangén, Diriamba, Nicaragua	Nicaragua	2–1	2–2	2006 FIFA World Cup qualification	
5	20 June 2004	Arnos Vale Stadium, Kingstown, Saint Vincent and the Grenadines	Nicaragua	1–0	4–1	2006 FIFA World Cup qualification	
6	20 June 2004	Arnos Vale Stadium, Kingstown, Saint Vincent and the Grenadines	Nicaragua	3–1	4–1	2006 FIFA World Cup qualification	
7	13 October 2004	Warner Park Sporting Complex, Basseterre, Saint Kitts and Nevis	Saint Kitts and Nevis	2–0	3–0	2006 FIFA World Cup qualification	
8	26 November 2004	Arnos Vale Stadium, Kingstown, Saint Vincent and the Grenadines	Bermuda	3–1	3–3	2005 Caribbean Cup qualification	
9	28 November 2004	Arnos Vale Stadium, Kingstown, Saint Vincent and the Grenadines	Cayman Islands	1–0	4–0	2005 Caribbean Cup qualification	
10	12 December 2004	Richmond Hill Playing Field, Kingstown, Saint Vincent and the Grenadines	Grenada	1–0	3–1	2005 Caribbean Cup qualification	
11	1 October 2006	Independence Park, Kingston, Jamaica	Saint Lucia	2–0	8–0	2007 Caribbean Cup qualification	
12	1 October 2006	Independence Park, Kingston, Jamaica	Saint Lucia	3–0	8–0	2007 Caribbean Cup qualification	
13	1 October 2006	Independence Park, Kingston, Jamaica	Saint Lucia	5–0	8–0	2007 Caribbean Cup qualification	
14	1 October 2006	Independence Park, Kingston, Jamaica	Saint Lucia	6–0	8–0	2007 Caribbean Cup qualification	
15	1 October 2006	Independence Park, Kingston, Jamaica	Saint Lucia	8–0	8–0	2007 Caribbean Cup qualification	
16	1 November 2006	Arnos Vale Stadium, Kingstown, Saint Vincent and the Grenadines	Grenada	–	4–1	Friendly	
17	1 November 2006	Arnos Vale Stadium, Kingstown, Saint Vincent and the Grenadines	Grenada	–	4–1	Friendly	
18	19 November 2006	Barbados National Stadium, Waterford, Barbados	Bermuda	2–0	3–0	2007 Caribbean Cup qualification	
19	19 November 2006	Barbados National Stadium, Waterford, Barbados	Bermuda	3–0	3–0	2007 Caribbean Cup qualification	
20	23 November 2006	Barbados National Stadium, Waterford, Barbados	Bahamas	1–1	3–2	2007 Caribbean Cup qualification	
21	23 November 2006	Barbados National Stadium, Waterford, Barbados	Bahamas	2–2	3–2	2007 Caribbean Cup qualification	
22	14 January 2007	Manny Ramjohn Stadium, Marabella, Trinidad and Tobago	Guyana	1–0	2–0	2007 Caribbean Cup	
23	6 October 2010	Victoria Park, Kingstown, Saint Vincent and the Grenadines	Montserrat	1–0	7–0	2010 Caribbean Cup qualification	
24	6 October 2010	Victoria Park, Kingstown, Saint Vincent and the Grenadines	Montserrat	2–0	7–0	2010 Caribbean Cup qualification	
25	6 October 2010	Victoria Park, Kingstown, Saint Vincent and the Grenadines	Montserrat	5–0	7–0	2010 Caribbean Cup qualification	
26	2 November 2011	Manny Ramjohn Stadium, Marabella, Trinidad and Tobago	Trinidad and Tobago	1–1	2–6	2010 Caribbean Cup qualification	
27	4 November 2011	Manny Ramjohn Stadium, Marabella, Trinidad and Tobago	Haiti	1–2	1–3	2010 Caribbean Cup qualification	
28	28 August 2011	Antigua Recreation Ground, St. John's, Antigua and Barbuda	Antigua and Barbuda	2–1	2–2	Friendly	
29	30 March 2012	Arnos Vale Stadium, Kingstown, Saint Vincent and the Grenadines	Antigua and Barbuda	1–0	1–0	Friendly	
30	1 April 2012	Arnos Vale Stadium, Kingstown, Saint Vincent and the Grenadines	Antigua and Barbuda	1–2	1–2	Friendly	
31	21 September 2014	A. O. Shirley Recreation Ground, Road Town, British Virgin Islands	British Virgin Islands	6–0	6–0	Friendly	
32	4 November 2015	Arnos Vale Stadium, Kingstown, Saint Vincent and the Grenadines	Antigua and Barbuda	2–1	2–1	Friendly	
33	25 March 2016	Arnos Vale Stadium, Kingstown, Saint Vincent and the Grenadines	Trinidad and Tobago	2–2	2–3	2018 FIFA World Cup qualification	

== Personal life ==
Samuel is the cousin of fellow Vincentian international footballer, Myron.

In 2011, Samuel was the highest paid Vincentian athlete, making $40,000 (USD).
