= Empire Club (football) =

- Founded: 24 April 1914; 112 years ago
- Ground: Wildey Turf; Bridgetown
- Capacity: 2000
- President: Tyrese Banks
- Manager: Darius Pemberton
- League: Division One
- 2026: 4th

Empire Club is a Barbadian professional association football club based in Bank Hall that competes in the Barbados Premier League.

== History ==
Empire Club was founded on 24 May 1914. The club has won the league championship once, in 1952.
