= Kemar Headley =

Barbadian footballer

Personal information
- Date of birth: 14 December 1993 (age 32)
- Place of birth: Barbados
- Position: Forward

Team information
- Current team: Weymouth Wales

Senior career*
Years	Team	Apps	(Gls)
2010–	Weymouth Wales		(22)

International career^{‡}
2012–2015	Barbados	8	(1)
- * Club domestic league appearances and goals ‡ National team caps and goals as of 16 June 2026

Kemar Headley (born 14 December 1993) is a Barbadian footballer who currently plays for the Weymouth Wales as a forward.

== Career ==
In 2010, he began his professional career for the Weymouth Wales. He made his international debut for Barbados in 2012.

== International career ==
=== International goals ===
Scores and results list the Barbados's goal tally first.

#	Date	Venue	Opponent	Score	Result	Competition
1.	6 March 2015	Barbados National Stadium, Bridgetown, Barbados	Saint Vincent and the Grenadines	1–0	3–1	Friendly
