= Eden Stars FC =

Barbados football club

Eden Stars
- Full name: Eden Stars
- Founded: 1995
- Ground: Saint Michael, Barbados
- League: Barbados First Division
- 2008: 1st in Remy Martin Division 1 Football League

Eden Stars is a Barbados football club, based in Eden Lodge in the southwestern parish of Saint Michael, Barbados.

The club was founded in 1995. After winning the Second Division title in 2008, they were relegated in 2009.
