= Youth Milan FC =

Barbadian football club

Youth Milan
- Full name: Arawak Cement Youth Milan
- Founded: 1995
- Ground: Saint Lucy, Barbados
- League: Barbados Premier Division
- 2011: 1st
Home colours

Youth Milan FC is a Barbados football club, based in Checker Hall in the northern parish of Saint Lucy.

Sponsored by Arawak Cement, they play in the Barbados' first division, the Barbados Premier Division.

The club was founded in 1995.

== Achievements ==
- Barbados Premier Division: 2

2006, 2011

- Barbados FA Cup: 2

2002, 2009
