= Pinelands United SC =

Barbados football club

- Full name: Pinelands United Sports Club
- Ground: Pinelands, Barbados
- League: Barbados Premier Division
- 2011: 5th

Pinelands United SC is a Barbados football club, based in Pinelands, a neighborhood within Bridgetown.

They play in the Barbados' first division, the Barbados Premier Division.

== Achievements ==
- Barbados Premier Division: 3

1982, 1985, 1992

Division One Champions 2010 KnockOut Champions 1987
