= Barbados Division One =

- Country: Barbados
- Confederation: CONCACAF
- Number of clubs: 12
- Level on pyramid: 2
- Promotion to: Barbados Premier League
- Relegation to: Barbados Division Two
- Domestic cup: Barbados FA Cup

The Barbados First Division is the second-tier league of football in Barbados. It is organized by the Barbados Football Association.

== List of Champions ==
Season	Winner	Runner-up	Ref.
2013	Pinelands FC		
2014	Rendezvous FC		
2015	Empire Club		
2016	Ellerton FC		
2017	Empire Club		
Season	Zone 1	Zone 2	Zone 3
2018	St. Andrew Lions	Central League Spartans	Barbados Soccer Academy
2019	Deacons FC	Wotton FC	N/A
2020	Not held because of COVID-19 pandemic		
2021	Not held because of COVID-19 pandemic		
2022	Not held because of COVID-19 pandemic		
Season	Winner	Runner-up	Ref.
2023	Barbados Soccer Academy	Kickstart Rush	
2024	Pride of Gall Hill	Silver Sands	
2025	Bagatelle FC	St. Andrew Lions	
2026	Parish Land	Pro-Shottas	
