= Barbados Premier League =

Top football league in Barbados

- Founded: 1947; 79 years ago
- First season: 1947
- Country: Barbados
- Confederation: CONCACAF
- Number of clubs: 10
- Level on pyramid: 1
- Relegation to: Barbados Division One
- Domestic cup: Barbados FA Cup
- International cup: CFU Club Shield
- Current champions: Weymouth Wales (2026)
- Most championships: Weymouth Wales (22 titles)
- Current: 2026 Barbados Premier League

The Premier League is the top football league in Barbados. The league was founded in 1947 and is headed by the Barbados Football Association. Ten teams participate in the league. The 9th and 10th-placed teams are relegated to Barbados Division One.

== Clubs ==
Locations of the 2027 Barbados Premier League teams

The following clubs will compete in the Barbados Premier League in 2027.

- Bagatelle (Bagatelle, Saint Thomas)
- Britton's Hill United (Brittons Hill, Bridgetown)
- Ellerton (Ellerton, Saint George)
- Kickstart Rush (Bridgetown)
- Paradise (Dover, Christ Church)
- Parish Land (Parish Land, Christ Church)
- Pride of Gall Hill (Gall Hill, Christ Church)
- Pro-Shottas (Bridgetown)
- UWI Blackbirds (Cave Hill, Saint Michael)
- Weymouth Wales (Carrington, Bridgetown)

== Champions ==
=== Title by season ===
Ed.	Season	Champion
1	1947–48	Spartan
2	1949	Spartan
3	1950	Spartan
4	1951	Spartan
5	1952	Empire
–	1953–1959	No Tournament
6	1960	Everton
–	1961	No Tournament
7	1962	New South Wales^{1}
8	1963	Everton
9	1964	New South Wales
10	1965	Everton
11	1966	Everton
12	1967	New South Wales
–	1968	No Tournament
13	1969	New South Wales
14	1970	New South Wales
15	1971	New South Wales
16	1972	New South Wales
17	1973	Pan-Am Wales^{1}
18	1974	Pan-Am Wales
19	1975	Pan-Am Wales
20	1976	Pan-Am Wales
–	1977	No Tournament
21	1978	Weymouth Wales^{1}
–	1979	No Tournament
–	1980	No Tournament
22	1981	Weymouth Wales
23	1982	Pinelands United
–	1983	No Tournament
24	1984	Weymouth Wales
25	1985	Pinelands United
26	1986	Weymouth Wales
27	1987	Everton
28	1988	Pride of Gall Hill
29	1989	Paradise
30	1990	Britton's Hill
–	1991	No Tournament
31	1992	Pinelands United
32	1993	Pride of Gall Hill
–	1994	No Tournament
33	1995	BDF
34	1996	Paradise
35	1997	Notre Dame
36	1998	Notre Dame
37	1999	Notre Dame
38	2000	Notre Dame
39	2001	Paradise
40	2002	Notre Dame
41	2003	Paradise
42	2004	Notre Dame
43	2005	Notre Dame
44	2006	Youth Milan
45	2007	BDF
46	2008	Notre Dame
47	2009	Britton's Hill
48	2010	Notre Dame
49	2011	Youth Milan
50	2012	Weymouth Wales
51	2013	BDF
52	2014	BDF
53	2015	BDF
54	2016	UWI Blackbirds
55	2017	Weymouth Wales
56	2018	Weymouth Wales
57	2018–19	BDF
58	2020	Season abandoned due to COVID-19 pandemic
–	2021–2022	No Tournament
59	2023	Weymouth Wales
60	2024	Weymouth Wales
61	2025	Weymouth Wales
62	2026	Weymouth Wales

=== Titles by club ===
Club	Titles	Seasons won
Weymouth Wales	22	1962, 1964, 1967, 1969, 1970, 1971, 1972, 1973, 1974, 1975, 1976, 1978, 1981, 1984, 1986, 2012, 2017, 2018, 2023, 2024, 2025, 2026
Notre Dame	9	1997, 1998, 1999, 2000, 2002, 2004, 2005, 2008, 2010
BDF	6	1995, 2007, 2013, 2014, 2015, 2018–19
Everton	5	1960, 1963, 1965, 1966, 1987
Paradise	4	1989, 1996, 2001, 2003
Pinelands United	3	1982, 1985, 1992
Youth Milan	2	2006, 2011
Britton's Hill	2	1990, 2009
Pride of Gall Hill	2	1988, 1993
UWI Blackbirds	1	2016
Empire	1	1952

== Top goalscorers ==
Season	Topscorer(s)	Club(s)	Goals
1999	(Barbados) Santhoshkumar Raju	Notre Dame	17
2001	(Barbados) Ajay Senthilkumar	Paradise	20
2002	(Barbados) Santhoshkumar Raju	Youth Milan	19
2003	(Barbados) Praveen Kumar	Barbados Defence Force	9
2004	(Barbados) Ravi P	Notre Dame	16
2004	(Barbados) Niranjan K	Beverley Hills	16
2005	(Barbados) Kotteshwaran Chittibabu	Silver Sands	21
2006	(Barbados) Jayamurthi Palani	Beverley Hills	17
2007	(Barbados) Yuvaraj Ramamoorthy	Barbados Defence Force	16
2008	(Barbados) Santhoshkumar Raju	Notre Dame	13
2009	(Barbados) Riviere Williams	Barbados Defence Force	18
2010	(Barbados) Kyle Gibson	Notre Dame	13
2011	(Barbados) Armando Lashley	Paradise	13
2012	(Barbados) Dwayne Stanford	Weymouth Wales	13
2013	(Barbados) Jabarry Chandler	Pride of Gall Hill	14
2014	(Barbados) Arantees Lawrence	Pinelands United	23
2015	(Barbados) Dwayne Stanford	Brittons Hill	15
2016	(Barbados) Mario Harte	UWI Blackbirds	29
2017	(Barbados) Zeco Edmee (Barbados) Arantees Lawrence	Notre Dame; Weymouth Wales	15
2018	(Barbados) Jabarry Chandler	Empire	19
2018–19	(Barbados) Armando Lashley	Paradise	26
2023	(Barbados) Zeco Edmee	Notre Dame	26
2024	(Barbados) Zeco Edmee	Notre Dame	15
2024	(Barbados) Arantees Lawrence	Weymouth Wales	15
2025	(Barbados) Shaquille Stewart	Weymouth Wales	14
2026	(Saint Vincent and the Grenadines) Kirtney Franklyn	Britton's Hill United	18

== Barbados clubs in international competition ==
Below is a list of appearances by clubs from the Barbados top-flight league in international competitions.

Club	Competition	Round	Opponent	Score
Notre Dame	1997 CFU Club Championship	Group Stage	(Guadeloupe) L'Étoile	0–0
Notre Dame	1997 CFU Club Championship	Group Stage	(Guyana) Omai Gold Seekers	2–0
Notre Dame	1997 CFU Club Championship	Group Stage	(Trinidad and Tobago) United Petrotrin	0–5
Notre Dame	1998 CFU Club Championship	Quarter-finals	(Trinidad and Tobago) Joe Public	0–4
Paradise	2000 CFU Club Championship	Group Stage	(Saint Lucia) Roots Alley Ballers	1–0
Paradise	2000 CFU Club Championship	Group Stage	(Jamaica) Harbour View	0–1
Paradise	2000 CFU Club Championship	Group Stage	(Haiti) Violette	1–2
Weymouth Wales	2018 Caribbean Club Shield	Group Stage	(Guadeloupe) USR	1–2
Weymouth Wales	2018 Caribbean Club Shield	Group Stage	(Suriname) Inter Moengotapoe	0–5
Weymouth Wales	2018 Caribbean Club Shield	Group Stage	(Aruba) Nacional	2–3
Weymouth Wales	2019 Caribbean Club Shield	Group Stage	(Guadeloupe) Moulien	0–1
Weymouth Wales	2019 Caribbean Club Shield	Group Stage	(Bonaire) Real Rincon	1–0
Weymouth Wales	2019 Caribbean Club Shield	Quarter-finals	Santiago de Cuba	2–0
Weymouth Wales	2019 Caribbean Club Shield	Semi-finals	(Suriname) Robinhood	0–3
Weymouth Wales	2025 CFU Club Shield	Group Stage	(Trinidad and Tobago) Police	3–1
Weymouth Wales	2025 CFU Club Shield	Group Stage	(British Virgin Islands) Wolues	8–0
Weymouth Wales	2025 CFU Club Shield	Semi-finals	(Martinique) Club Franciscain	2–1
Weymouth Wales	2025 CFU Club Shield	Final	(Dominican Republic) Moca	2–3
Weymouth Wales	2025 CONCACAF Caribbean Cup	Group Stage	(Dominican Republic) Cibao	1–2
Weymouth Wales	2025 CONCACAF Caribbean Cup	Group Stage	(Haiti) Juventus des Cayes	2–1
Weymouth Wales	2025 CONCACAF Caribbean Cup	Group Stage	(Trinidad and Tobago) Defence Force	1–1
Weymouth Wales	2025 CONCACAF Caribbean Cup	Group Stage	(Jamaica) Cavalier	2–1
Weymouth Wales	2026 CFU Club Shield	Round of 16	(Aruba) Britannia	1–1, 4-3 PK
Weymouth Wales	2026 CFU Club Shield	Quarter-finals	(Jamaica) Mount Pleasant	0–1

== See also ==
- Barbados men's national football team
- Barbados men's national under-17 football team
- Barbados women's national football team
- Barbados Football Association
- Football in Barbados
- Sport in Barbados

== Notes ==
- ^Note 1 - Club is now known as Weymouth Wales. The club was called "New South Wales" from 1962 to 1972, and then "Pan-Am Wales" from 1973 to 1977.
