= Silver Sands FC =

Barbados football club

Silver Sands
- Full name: Silver Sands F.C.
- Chairman: Carlos Warde
- Manager: Richard Trotman
- League: Barbados Division One
- 2026: 11th

Silver Sands F.C. is a football club, based in the parish of Christ Church, Barbados. They play in the Barbados Premier Division, the top tier of football in Barbados.
