= Pride of Gall Hill FC =

Barbados football club

Pride of Gall Hill
- Full name: Stephen Lashley Pride of Gall Hill
- Ground: Christ Church, Barbados
- Manager: Eyre Sealy
- League: Barbados Premier League
- 2026: 7th

Pride of Gall Hill FC are a Barbados football club, based in Gall Hill near Oistins in the southern parish of Christ Church. Sponsored by Stephen Lashley, they play in the Barbados' first division, the Barbados Premier Division.

== Achievements ==
- Barbados Premier Division: 2

1988, 1993

- Barbados FA Cup: 4

1993, 1995, 1998, 2006
