= Ellerton FC =

- Full name: Ellerton Football Club
- Founded: 1995; 31 years ago
- Ground: Barbados National Stadium; Bridgetown
- Capacity: 5,000
- President: Devante Nicholson
- Manager: Rodgerius Coombes
- League: Barbados Premier League
- 2026: BPL, 4th

Ellerton FC is a Barbadian association football club based in Bridgetown that competes in the Barbados Premier League.

== History ==
The club was founded as Ellerton City FC in 1995. The club has never won the league championship.
