= UWI Blackbirds FC =

Barbados football club

- Full name: UWI Blackbirds Football Club
- Nickname: Blackbirds
- Ground: Usain Bolt Sports Complex
- Capacity: 950
- Chairman: Amanda Reifer
- Manager: Fabian Massiah
- League: Barbados Premier League
- 2026: 6th

UWI Blackbirds FC is a professional football club based in Cave Hill, Saint Michael, Barbados. It is the football division of the UWI Blackbirds. In 2016, the team won their first Premier Division title.

== Honours ==
- Barbados Premier Division: 1

2016
