= Britton's Hill United FC =

Barbados football club

Brittons Hill United FC
- Full name: Mackeson Brittons Hill
- Founded: 1979
- Ground: Barbados Valery Pasture; Bridgetown, Barbados
- Coach: Fabian Wharton
- League: Barbados Premier League
- 2026: BPL, 3rd

Brittons Hill United FC is a Barbados professional football club based in Brittons Hill on the southside of Bridgetown in the parish of Saint Michael.

They play their home games in the capital Bridgetown, in the Barbados' first division, the Barbados Premier Division.

They are the only Barbadian club to win promotion to the Premier Division and win the Premier Division in consecutive seasons (1989 and 1990).

== Achievements ==
- Barbados Premier Division: 2

1990, 2009

- Barbados FA Cup: 1

2007
