= Notre Dame SC =

Barbados football club

- Full name: Claytons Kola Tonic Notre Dame SC
- Founded: 1947; 79 years ago
- Ground: Bay Pasture
- Capacity: 5,000
- Chairman: Nyron Russell
- Manager: Giancarlo Cobham
- League: Barbados Division One
- 2025: 6th

Notre Dame SC is a Barbados professional football club based on the southside of Bridgetown in the community of Bayville in the parish of Saint Michael.

Notre Dame is the second most successful club in Barbados football history, winning 9 league titles and 6 domestic cups. They play their home games in Bayville on the Bay Pasture, in Barbados' second division, the Barbados Division One.

== Achievements ==
- Barbados Premier Division
  - 1997, 1998, 1999, 2000, 2002, 2004, 2005, 2008, 2010
- Barbados FA Cup
  - 1982, 1997, 2001, 2004, 2008, 2010
