= Weymouth Wales FC =

Barbadian association football club

Weymouth Wales
- Full name: Weymouth Wales Football Club
- Nickname: Wales
- Founded: 16 December 1958; 67 years ago
- Ground: Wildey Turf
- Capacity: 2,000
- Chairman: Jamali Stevens
- Coach: Rashon Jones
- League: Barbados Premier League
- 2026: Champions
Home colours	Away colours

Weymouth Wales Football Club, commonly referred to as Weymouth Wales, is a Barbadian professional football club, based in Carrington Village in the parish of Saint Michael.

== History ==
Weymouth Wales FC was founded on December 16, 1958. Having won several league and cup titles in the 1960s and 1970s as New South Wales and Pan- Am Wales, it was then renamed to Weymouth Wales. They continued their dominance in the 1980s and 90s.

== Achievements ==
- Barbados Premier Division: 22

1962, 1964, 1967, 1969, 1970, 1971, 1972, 1973, 1974, 1975, 1976, 1978, 1981, 1984, 1986, 2012, 2017, 2018, 2023, 2024, 2025, 2026

- Barbados FA Cup: 15

1967, 1969, 1970, 1972, 1975, 1984, 1987, 2011, 2014, 2016, 2017, 2019, 2023, 2024, 2025,

- Capelli Cup: 1

2019

- Republic Cup: 2

2022, 2023
