= Barbados Defence Force Sports Program =

Sporting arm of the Barbados Defence Force

The Barbados Defence Force Sports Program (BDFSP) is the sporting arm of the Barbados Defence Force. BDFSP recruits and trains athletes in five disciplines; football, cricket, table tennis, athletics and boxing. The program provides an opportunity for talented Barbadian athletes to concentrate on their chosen sport.

BDFSP enter teams in the Barbados national competitions in both football and cricket.

== Cricket ==
BDFSP is a cricket team that competes in the Barbados Cricket Association Division 1 competition. The team was promoted to Division 1 for 2011, after having been relegated to the Upper Intermediate Division for the 2010 season. BDFSP have never won the Division 1 championship.

Notable cricketers to have played for BDFSP include Tino Best.

== Football ==
Barbados Defence Force
- Full name: Barbados Defence Force Sports Program
- Nickname: Barbabos Army
- Ground: Wildey Turf; Bridgetown, Barbados
- Capacity: 2,000
- Chairman: Lt. Gen. Keyshawn Rodgers
- Manager: Shakeem Carlson
- League: Barbados Premier Division
- 2015: 1st
Home colours

The Barbados Defence Force Sports Program (BDFSP) football club is based in Paragon in the parish of Christ Church. They play their home games in the town of Bridgetown, in the Barbados' first division, the Barbados Premier League. The Barbados Defence Force also sponsors a team the second division, Division One. Both teams are commonly called "Barbados Defence Force" or simply BDF, but to distinguish the two clubs in competitions in which both teams participate (like the Barbados FA Cup), the Premier League side are called BDFSP and the Division One side are called BDF.

=== Achievements ===
- Barbados Premier League: 6

1995, 2007, 2013, 2014, 2015, 2019

- Barbados FA Cup: 3

1994, 2012, 2015

- Barbados Super 8 Cup: 1

2008
