= Paradise FC (Barbados) =

Barbados football club

- Full name: Paradise Football Club
- Ground: Christ Church
- Capacity: 2,000
- President: Adrian Donovan
- Coach: Keon Henderson
- League: Barbados Premier League
- 2026: BPL, 5th

Paradise FC is a Barbadian professional football club based in Dover, in the southern parish of Christ Church.

They play in the Barbadian first division, the Barbados Premier League.

== Current squad ==
Note: Flags indicate national team as defined under FIFA eligibility rules; some limited exceptions apply. Players may hold more than one non-FIFA nationality.

| No. | Pos. | Nation | Player |
|---|---|---|---|
| — | DF | BRB | Barry Skeete |

== Achievements ==
- Barbados Premier League: 4

1989, 1996, 2001, 2003

- Barbados FA Cup: 6

1996, 1999, 2000, 2003, 2005, 2018

== Historic goalscorer ==
Armando Lashley
| | Premier League | FA Cup | Total |
| Goals | 146 | 7 | 153 |
| Hat-tricks | 9 | 1 | 10 |
| Topscorers | 2 | - | 2 |
| Season | 2010-2024 | | |
