= 2024 CONCACAF U-20 Championship qualifying =

2024 CONCACAF U-20 Championship qualifying stage
Tournament details
- Host countries: Nicaragua (Group A); Antigua and Barbuda (Group B); Guatemala (Group C); Trinidad and Tobago (Group D); Saint Kitts and Nevis (Groups E and F)
- Dates: 23 February – 2 March 2024
- Teams: 27 (from 1 confederation)

Tournament statistics
- Matches played: 48
- Goals scored: 204 (4.25 per match)
- Top scorer(s): (British Virgin Islands) Azarni Callwood (6 goals)

2024 CONCACAF U-20 Championship qualifying took place between 23 February and 2 March 2024 across five countries in Central America and the Caribbean. The teams competed for six of the twelve berths in the 2024 CONCACAF U-20 Championship final tournament.

The qualifying tournament featured changes in its format from the previous two editions. The number of participating teams in qualifying was increased as only six teams were exempt from this stage. Consequently, the qualifying groups were also increased from four to six, with the six group winners qualifying for the final tournament instead of the four teams that qualified in the previous two editions.

As in the 2020 edition, each qualifying group took place in one of the nations that made it up.

== Teams ==
The 41 CONCACAF teams were ranked based on the CONCACAF Men's Under-20 Ranking as of 12 June 2023. A total of 33 teams entered the qualifying or the final tournament. The highest-ranked 6 entrants were exempt from qualifying and advanced directly to the group stage of the final tournament, while the lowest-ranked 27 entrants had to participate in qualifying, with the six group winners joining the six top-ranked teams in the group stage of the final tournament.

Exempt from qualifying (6 teams)
Rank	Team	Points
1	United States	7,207
2	Honduras	4,573
3	Mexico	4,450
4	Panama	3,720
5	Costa Rica	2,640
6	Dominican Republic	2,555

Key to colors
Group winners advance to 2024 CONCACAF U-20 Championship

Participating in qualifying stage (27 teams)
Rank	Team	Points
7	Guatemala	2,470
8	El Salvador	2,445
9	Haiti	1,972
10	Cuba	1,948
11	Jamaica	1,835
12	Canada	1,805
13	Trinidad and Tobago	1,777
14	Curaçao	1,319
15	Nicaragua	1,221
16	Antigua and Barbuda	1,122
17	Puerto Rico	1,092
19	Bermuda	975
20	Saint Kitts and Nevis	930
21	Suriname	887
22	Aruba	873
23	Grenada	805
24	Belize	748
25	Saint Vincent and the Grenadines	714
26	Cayman Islands	694
27	Guyana	641
29	Dominica	579
31	British Virgin Islands	458
32	Saint Martin (Note: Non-FIFA members and thus ineligible to play in World Cup.)	417
33	Martinique	399
34	Barbados	391
36	Anguilla	184
37	Turks and Caicos Islands	34

Did not enter tournament (8 teams)
Rank	Team	Points
18	Saint Lucia	979
28	Guadeloupe	626
30	Sint Maarten	458
35	U.S. Virgin Islands	293
38	Montserrat	0
39	French Guiana	0
40	Bonaire	0
41	Bahamas	0

== Draw ==
The draw for the qualifying round took place on 11 October 2023, 11:00 EDT (UTC−4), at the CONCACAF Headquarters in Miami. The 27 teams which entered the qualifying stage were drawn into six groups: three groups of five teams and three groups of four teams. Previously, the 27 teams had been allocated into five pots based on the CONCACAF Men's Under-20 Ranking as of 12 June 2023.

Pot 1	Pot 2	Pot 3	Pot 4	Pot 5
Guatemala; El Salvador; Haiti; Cuba; Jamaica; Canada	Trinidad and Tobago; Curaçao; Nicaragua; Antigua and Barbuda; Puerto Rico; Bermuda	Saint Kitts and Nevis; Suriname; Aruba; Grenada; Belize; Saint Vincent and the Grenadines	Cayman Islands; Guyana; Dominica; British Virgin Islands; Saint Martin; Martinique	Barbados; Anguilla; Turks and Caicos Islands

The draw started with pot 1 and ended with pot 5, with each team selected then allocated into the groups alphabetically. The position of the teams within their group followed the same order, with the teams from pot 1 placed on the first line and so on until the teams from pot 5 were placed on line 5.

The draw resulted in the following groups (host nation marked in bold):

Group A
Pos	Team
A1	Cuba
A2	**Nicaragua**
A3	Belize
A4	British Virgin Islands
A5	Anguilla

Group D
Pos	Team
D1	Canada
D2	**Trinidad and Tobago**
D3	Saint Vincent and the Grenadines
D4	Dominica

Group B
Pos	Team
B1	El Salvador
B2	**Antigua and Barbuda**
B3	Suriname
B4	Guyana
B5	Turks and Caicos Islands

Group E
Pos	Team
E1	Haiti
E2	Puerto Rico
E3	**Saint Kitts and Nevis**
E4	Cayman Islands

Group C
Pos	Team
C1	**Guatemala**
C2	Curaçao
C3	Aruba
C4	Saint Martin
C5	Barbados

Group F
Pos	Team
F1	Jamaica
F2	Bermuda
F3	Grenada
F4	Martinique

== Groups ==
The fixture list was confirmed by CONCACAF on 11 October 2023, after the draw. All match times are local times as listed by CONCACAF (Eastern Standard Time (UTC−5), if different, are in parentheses).

Tiebreakers

The ranking of teams in each group was determined as follows (Regulations Article 12.3):

1. Points obtained in all group matches (three points for a win, one for a draw, zero for a loss);
2. Goal difference in all group matches;
3. Number of goals scored in all group matches;
4. Points obtained in the matches played between the teams in question;
5. Goal difference in the matches played between the teams in question;
6. Number of goals scored in the matches played between the teams in question;
7. Fair play points in all group matches (only one deduction could be applied to a player in a single match):
  - Yellow card: −1 points;
  - Indirect red card (second yellow card): −3 points;
  - Direct red card: −4 points;
  - Yellow card and direct red card: −5 points;
8. Drawing of lots.

=== Group A ===
Group A took place in Managua, Nicaragua. All match times are NIT (UTC−6) and the Eastern Standard Time (UTC−5) are in parentheses, as listed by CONCACAF.

Pos	Team	Pld	W	D	L	GF	GA	GD	Pts	Qualification
1	Cuba	4	4	0	0	18	2	+16	12	2024 CONCACAF U-20 Championship
2	Nicaragua (H)	4	3	0	1	20	2	+18	9	
3	British Virgin Islands	4	2	0	2	8	14	−6	6	
4	Belize	4	1	0	3	7	12	−5	3	
5	Anguilla	4	0	0	4	2	25	−23	0	

Source: CONCACAF
(H) Hosts
23 February 2024
16:00 (17:00 EST)

Cuba	13–0	Anguilla
Campos 3', 25', 30'; Mena 13' (pen.); Camejo 15'; K. Pérez 27'; D. Pérez 40', 47', 71'; Mendoza 41' (pen.); Rodríguez 62'; Vega 77', 90+6'	Report

Nicaragua National Football Stadium, Managua
Referee: Sergio Reyna (Guatemala)
23 February 2024
19:00 (20:00 EST)

Nicaragua	8–0	British Virgin Islands
Gutiérrez 6'; Castillo 12', 39'; Cayasso 25'; A. Martínez 47', 61'; Ortiz 56'; I. Martínez 81'	Report

Nicaragua National Football Stadium, Managua
Referee: Fernando Morón (Panama)

25 February 2024
16:00 (17:00 EST)

British Virgin Islands	1–2	Cuba
Callwood 30'	Report	K. Pérez 14'; Rodríguez 66' (pen.)

Nicaragua National Football Stadium, Managua
Referee: Raúl Castro (Honduras)
25 February 2024
19:00 (20:00 EST)

Belize	0–6	Nicaragua
	Report	A. Martínez 4'; Castillo 13', 52'; Bello 47'; Gutiérrez 50'; Uriarte 90+3'

Nicaragua National Football Stadium, Managua
Referee: Josué Ugalde (Costa Rica)

27 February 2024
16:00 (17:00 EST)

British Virgin Islands	4–3	Belize
Callwood 38' (pen.), 45+2'; Lane 40'; Lacey 70' (pen.)	Report	Mena 16'; Taegar 54' (pen.); F. Martinez 58' (pen.)

Nicaragua National Football Stadium, Managua
Referee: José Corporán (Dominican Republic)
27 February 2024
19:00 (20:00 EST)

Nicaragua	5–0	Anguilla
Bello 19'; Castillo 37'; Uriarte 53'; A. Martínez 60'; Cayasso 69'	Report

Nicaragua National Football Stadium, Managua
Referee: Luis Enrique Santander (Mexico)

29 February 2024
16:00 (17:00 EST)

Anguilla	1–3	British Virgin Islands
Smeins 28'	Report	Callwood 18', 23', 89'

Nicaragua National Football Stadium, Managua
Referee: Filiberto Martínez (El Salvador)
29 February 2024
19:00 (20:00 EST)

Cuba	1–0	Belize
A. Casanova 12'	Report

Nicaragua National Football Stadium, Managua
Referee: Sanchez Bass (Saint Kitts and Nevis)

2 March 2024
16:00 (17:00 EST)

Belize	4–1	Anguilla
F. Martinez 3', 10', 24'; Taegar 49'	Report	Smeins 60'

Nicaragua National Football Stadium, Managua
Referee: Sergio Reyna (Guatemala)
2 March 2024
19:00 (20:00 EST)

Nicaragua	1–2	Cuba
Uriarte 90+4'	Report	Mena 50'; Vega 63'

Nicaragua National Football Stadium, Managua
Referee: Luis Enrique Santander (Mexico)

=== Group B ===
Group B took place in Piggotts, Antigua and Barbuda. All match times are AGT (UTC−4) and the Eastern Standard Time (UTC−5) are in parentheses, as listed by CONCACAF.

Pos	Team	Pld	W	D	L	GF	GA	GD	Pts	Qualification
1	El Salvador	4	3	1	0	13	2	+11	10	2024 CONCACAF U-20 Championship
2	Suriname	4	3	0	1	14	8	+6	9	
3	Antigua and Barbuda (H)	4	2	0	2	8	5	+3	6	
4	Guyana	4	1	1	2	5	11	−6	4	
5	Turks and Caicos Islands	4	0	0	4	4	18	−14	0	

Source: CONCACAF
(H) Hosts
23 February 2024
10:30 (9:30 EST)

El Salvador	7–0	Turks and Caicos Islands
Argueta 26'; España 37'; Menjívar 41'; W. Díaz 67', 80'; López 90+1'; N. Díaz 90+3'	Report

ABFA Technical Center, Piggotts
Referee: Hakeem Harvey (Saint Kitts and Nevis)
23 February 2024
15:00 (14:00 EST)

Antigua and Barbuda	4–0	Guyana
Parker 2'; A. Jarvis 16' (pen.); Douglas 18'; J. Jarvis 84'	Report

ABFA Technical Center, Piggotts
Referee: Norberto da Silva (Curaçao)

25 February 2024
10:30 (9:30 EST)

Guyana	2–2	El Salvador
Pydana 10', 83' (pen.)	Report	Casamalhuapa 22'; W. Díaz 62'

ABFA Technical Center, Piggotts
Referee: Steffon Dewar (Jamaica)
25 February 2024
15:00 (14:00 EST)

Suriname	3–2	Antigua and Barbuda
Pinas 16'; Prijor 45+4' (pen.); van Gom 89'	Report	Gonsalves 69'; D. Gumbs 90+5'

ABFA Technical Center, Piggotts
Referee: Lukasz Szpala (United States)

27 February 2024
10:30 (9:30 EST)

Guyana	1–4	Suriname
Martin 76'	Report	Pinas 8'; Rijssel 36'; Prijor 85'; Misidjang 89'

ABFA Technical Center, Piggotts
Referee: Ricangel de Leça (Aruba)
27 February 2024
15:00 (14:00 EST)

Antigua and Barbuda	2–1	Turks and Caicos Islands
J. Jarvis 54'; Douglas 82'	Report	Louisy 90+4' (pen.)

ABFA Technical Center, Piggotts
Referee: Tristley Bassue (Saint Kitts and Nevis)

29 February 2024
10:30 (9:30 EST)

Turks and Caicos Islands	1–2	Guyana
Martin 89'	Report	Rowland 32', 54'

ABFA Technical Center, Piggotts
Referee: Daniel Quintero Huitrón (Mexico)
29 February 2024
15:00 (14:00 EST)

El Salvador	3–0	Suriname
Argueta 17'; Delgado 25'; Casamalhuapa 65'	Report

ABFA Technical Center, Piggotts
Referee: Kwinsi Williams (Trinidad and Tobago)

2 March 2024
10:30 (9:30 EST)

Suriname	7–2	Turks and Caicos Islands
Olfers 5'; Pinas 14', 32'; Misidjang 18'; Prijor 20', 31'; Kluivert 45+1'	Report	Williams 29'; Gedeon 87'

ABFA Technical Center, Piggotts
Referee: Daniel Quintero Huitrón (Mexico)
2 March 2024
15:00 (14:00 EST)

Antigua and Barbuda	0–1	El Salvador
	Report	Guardado 58'

ABFA Technical Center, Piggotts
Referee: Lukasz Szpala (United States)

=== Group C ===
Group C took place in Guatemala City, Guatemala. All match times are GTT (UTC−6) and the Eastern Standard Time (UTC−5) are in parentheses, as listed by CONCACAF.

Pos	Team	Pld	W	D	L	GF	GA	GD	Pts	Qualification
1	Guatemala (H)	4	4	0	0	15	1	+14	12	2024 CONCACAF U-20 Championship
2	Curaçao	4	2	1	1	3	2	+1	7	
3	Aruba	4	1	2	1	6	7	−1	5	
4	Barbados	4	1	1	2	6	7	−1	4	
5	Saint Martin	4	0	0	4	2	15	−13	0	

Updated to match(es) played on 2 March 2024. Source: CONCACAF
(H) Hosts
23 February 2024
16:00 (17:00 EST)

Curaçao	1–0	Saint Martin
Bernardina 90+3'	Report

Estadio Doroteo Guamuch Flores, Guatemala City
Referee: José Torres (Puerto Rico)
23 February 2024
19:00 (20:00 EST)

Guatemala	3–1	Barbados
Prillwitz 17'; O. Escobar 32'; Racancoj 80'	Report	Massiah 28'

Estadio Doroteo Guamuch Flores, Guatemala City
Referee: Adonis Carrasco (Dominican Republic)

25 February 2024
16:00 (17:00 EST)

Aruba	1–1	Curaçao
Van Kilsdonk 25'	Report	Marchena 72'

Estadio Doroteo Guamuch Flores, Guatemala City
Referee: Jaime Herrera (El Salvador)
25 February 2024
19:00 (20:00 EST)

Saint Martin	0–6	Guatemala
	Report	Flanders 13' (o.g.); Evans 44', 61', 68'; Méndez 56'; Sagastume 90+3'

Estadio Doroteo Guamuch Flores, Guatemala City
Referee: Reginald Gumbs (Saint Kitts and Nevis)

27 February 2024
16:00 (17:00 EST)

Saint Martin	0–4	Aruba
	Report	Van Kilsdonk 19', 41', 45'; Jo. Kruydenhof 39'

Estadio Doroteo Guamuch Flores, Guatemala City
Referee: Melvin Matamoros (Honduras)
27 February 2024
19:00 (20:00 EST)

Curaçao	1–0	Barbados
Inesia 31'	Report

Estadio Doroteo Guamuch Flores, Guatemala City
Referee: Oliver Vergara (Panama)

29 February 2024
16:00 (17:00 EST)

Barbados	4–2	Saint Martin
Webster 1'; Taylor 77'; Vanderpool-Nurse 80', 90+1'	Report	Joe 42'; Peters 74'

Estadio Doroteo Guamuch Flores, Guatemala City
Referee: Reon Radix (Grenada)
29 February 2024
19:00 (20:00 EST)

Guatemala	5–0	Aruba
Muñoz 8'; Méndez 24', 37' (pen.); Evans 45'; De la Cruz 85'	Report

Estadio Doroteo Guamuch Flores, Guatemala City
Referee: Fernando Hernández (Mexico)

2 March 2024
16:00 (17:00 EST)

Aruba	1–1	Barbados
La Cruz 9' (pen.)	Report	Harewood 35'

Estadio Doroteo Guamuch Flores, Guatemala City
Referee: Oliver Vergara (Panama)
2 March 2024
19:00 (20:00 EST)

Curaçao	0–1	Guatemala
	Report	Escobar 63'

Estadio Doroteo Guamuch Flores, Guatemala City
Referee: Reon Radix (Grenada)

=== Group D ===
Group D took place in Port of Spain, Trinidad and Tobago. All match times are TTT (UTC−4) and the Eastern Standard Time (UTC−5) are in parentheses, as listed by CONCACAF.

Pos	Team	Pld	W	D	L	GF	GA	GD	Pts	Qualification
1	Canada	3	3	0	0	15	0	+15	9	2024 CONCACAF U-20 Championship
2	Trinidad and Tobago (H)	3	2	0	1	8	5	+3	6	
3	Saint Vincent and the Grenadines	3	1	0	2	5	9	−4	3	
4	Dominica	3	0	0	3	2	16	−14	0	

Source: CONCACAF
(H) Hosts
23 February 2024
16:00 (15:00 EST)

Canada	8–0	Dominica
Morgan 8', 36', 47'; López 26', 65'; Tavernier 27'; Kozlovskiy 87', 90+4'	Report

Hasely Crawford Stadium, Port of Spain
Referee: Kimbell Ward (Saint Kitts and Nevis)
23 February 2024
19:00 (18:00 EST)

Trinidad and Tobago	3–2	Saint Vincent and the Grenadines
Cooper 36'; Noel 64'; Chaves 90+5'	Report	Franklyn 3' (pen.); Pierre 28'

Hasely Crawford Stadium, Port of Spain
Referee: José Fuentes (Guatemala)

25 February 2024
16:00 (15:00 EST)

Saint Vincent and the Grenadines	0–4	Canada
	Report	Ciccarelli 23', 54', 89' (pen.); Biello 51'

Hasely Crawford Stadium, Port of Spain
Referee: Okeito Nicholson (Jamaica)
25 February 2024
19:00 (18:00 EST)

Dominica	0–5	Trinidad and Tobago
	Report	Chaves 3'; Noel 19', 35'; Cardines 37'; Garcia 83'

Hasely Crawford Stadium, Port of Spain
Referee: Jefferson Escobar (Honduras)

27 February 2024
16:00 (15:00 EST)

Dominica	2–3	Saint Vincent and the Grenadines
Richards 40'; Thomas 90+5'	Report	Cain 10' (pen.); Franklyn 44'; Pierre 90+2'

Hasely Crawford Stadium, Port of Spain
Referee: José Valladares (Honduras)
27 February 2024
19:00 (18:00 EST)

Trinidad and Tobago	0–3	Canada
	Report	Morgan 10'; López 54'; Tavernier 79'

Hasely Crawford Stadium, Port of Spain
Referee: Shavin Greene (Guyana)

=== Group E ===
Group E took place in Basseterre, Saint Kitts and Nevis. All match times are TTT (UTC−4) and the Eastern Standard Time (UTC−5) are in parentheses, as listed by CONCACAF.

Pos	Team	Pld	W	D	L	GF	GA	GD	Pts	Qualification
1	Haiti	3	2	1	0	9	2	+7	7	2024 CONCACAF U-20 Championship
2	Puerto Rico	3	1	2	0	7	2	+5	5	
3	Saint Kitts and Nevis (H)	3	1	0	2	3	9	−6	3	
4	Cayman Islands	3	0	1	2	2	8	−6	1	

Source: CONCACAF
(H) Hosts
23 February 2024
16:00 (15:00 EST)

Haiti	4–1	Cayman Islands
Lebrun 12'; Destin 56', 80', 90+5' (pen.)	Report	Campbell 61'

SKNFA Technical Center, Basseterre
Referee: Timothy Derry (Trinidad and Tobago)
23 February 2024
19:00 (18:00 EST)

Puerto Rico	5–0	Saint Kitts and Nevis
Biaggi 5'; Otero 24'; Wattley 47' (o.g.); Cruz 85'; Medina 88'	Report

SKNFA Technical Center, Basseterre
Referee: Moeth Gaymes (Saint Vincent and the Grenadines)

25 February 2024
16:00 (15:00 EST)

Cayman Islands	1–1	Puerto Rico
Byles 23'	Report	Donato 79'

SKNFA Technical Center, Basseterre
Referee: Ken Pennyfeather (Antigua and Barbuda)
25 February 2024
19:00 (18:00 EST)

Saint Kitts and Nevis	0–4	Haiti
	Report	Destin 6'; Isaie 9'; Vilsaint 45+3'; Jean-Francois 87'

SKNFA Technical Center, Basseterre
Referee: Víctor Cáceres (Mexico)

27 February 2024
16:00 (15:00 EST)

Haiti	1–1	Puerto Rico
Belmar 71'	Report	Menendez 39'

SKNFA Technical Center, Basseterre
Referee: Christopher Mason (Jamaica)
27 February 2024
19:00 (18:00 EST)

Saint Kitts and Nevis	3–0	Cayman Islands
Hamilton 16', 45+1', 81'	Report

SKNFA Technical Center, Basseterre
Referee: Nelson Salgado (Honduras)

=== Group F ===
Group F also took place in Basseterre, Saint Kitts and Nevis. All match times are TTT (UTC−4) and the Eastern Standard Time (UTC−5) are in parentheses, as listed by CONCACAF.

Pos	Team	Pld	W	D	L	GF	GA	GD	Pts	Qualification
1	Jamaica	3	3	0	0	6	2	+4	9	2024 CONCACAF U-20 Championship
2	Martinique	3	1	1	1	6	6	0	4	
3	Bermuda	3	1	0	2	5	6	−1	3	
4	Grenada	3	0	1	2	5	8	−3	1	

Source: CONCACAF
24 February 2024
16:00 (15:00 EST)

Bermuda	2–1	Grenada
Ming 37'; Robinson 71'	Report	Valcin 42'

SKNFA Technical Center, Basseterre
Referee: Sergio Rozenhout (Suriname)
24 February 2024
19:00 (18:00 EST)

Jamaica	1–0	Martinique
Blake 67'	Report

SKNFA Technical Center, Basseterre
Referee: Víctor Rivas (United States)

26 February 2024
16:00 (15:00 EST)

Martinique	2–1	Bermuda
Gervais 33'; Guillaume 63'	Report	Robinson 82'

SKNFA Technical Center, Basseterre
Referee: David Gómez (Costa Rica)
26 February 2024
19:00 (18:00 EST)

Grenada	0–2	Jamaica
	Report	Simmonds 30'; Barrett 82'

SKNFA Technical Center, Basseterre
Referee: Randy Encarnación (Dominican Republic)

28 February 2024
16:00 (15:00 EST)

Grenada	4–4	Martinique
Redhead 9', 84'; Valcin 36'; Juba 70'	Report	Léria 4'; Lamorandière 14', 35', 80'

SKNFA Technical Center, Basseterre
Referee: Filip Dujic (Canada)
28 February 2024
19:00 (18:00 EST)

Jamaica	3–2	Bermuda
R. Gordon 2'; Reynolds 11'; A. Gordon 83'	Report	Deroza 50'; Dill 61' (pen.)

SKNFA Technical Center, Basseterre
Referee: Julio Luna (Guatemala)

== Goalscorers ==
There were 204 goals scored in 48 matches, for an average of 4.25 goals per match.

6 goals

- (British Virgin Islands) Azarni Callwood

5 goals

- (Nicaragua) Francis Castillo

4 goals

- (Aruba) Connor van Kilsdonk
- (Belize) Felix Martinez
- (Canada) Myles Morgan
- (Guatemala) Matthew Evans
- (Haiti) Bryan Destin
- (Nicaragua) Andrés Martínez
- (Suriname) Robinio Pinas
- (Suriname) Djaier Prijor

3 goals

- (Canada) Tavio Ciccarelli
- (Canada) Santiago López
- (Cuba) Marcos Campos
- (Cuba) David Pérez
- (Cuba) Maikol Vega
- (El Salvador) Wilber Díaz
- (Guatemala) Daniel Méndez
- (Martinique) Lenny Lamorandière
- (Nicaragua) Juban Uriarte
- (Saint Kitts and Nevis) De Quan Hamilton
- (Trinidad and Tobago) Larry Noel

2 goals

- (Anguilla) Jared Smeins
- (Antigua and Barbuda) Christopher Douglas
- (Antigua and Barbuda) Javaughn Jarvis
- (Barbados) Khalil Vanderpool-Nurse
- (Belize) Isaac Taegar
- (Bermuda) Riley Robinson
- (Canada) Sergei Kozlovskiy
- (Canada) Kevaughn Tavernier
- (Cuba) Leandro Mena
- (Cuba) Karel Pérez
- (Cuba) Samuel Rodríguez
- (El Salvador) Christopher Argueta
- (El Salvador) Kiano Casamalhuapa
- (Grenada) Caleb Redhead
- (Grenada) Vijay Valcin
- (Guatemala) Olger Escobar
- (Guyana) Nathaniel Pydana
- (Guyana) Ezekial Rowland
- (Nicaragua) Oliver Bello
- (Nicaragua) Kenler Cayasso
- (Nicaragua) Joab Gutiérrez
- (Saint Vincent and the Grenadines) Kirtney Franklyn
- (Saint Vincent and the Grenadines) Steven Pierre
- (Suriname) Donagay Misidjang
- (Trinidad and Tobago) Michael Chaves

1 goal

- (Antigua and Barbuda) Eroy Gonsalves
- (Antigua and Barbuda) Davian Gumbs
- (Antigua and Barbuda) Aiden Jarvis
- (Antigua and Barbuda) Javauhn Parker
- (Aruba) Joachim Kruydenhof
- (Aruba) Nathan La Cruz
- (Barbados) Shamari Harewood
- (Barbados) Rovaldo Massiah
- (Barbados) Ethan Taylor
- (Barbados) Xavier Webster
- (Belize) Jaheim Mena
- (Bermuda) Xahvi Deroza
- (Bermuda) Hayden Dill
- (Bermuda) Sachiel Ming
- (British Virgin Islands) Johari Lacey
- (British Virgin Islands) Curtis Lane
- (Canada) Alessandro Biello
- (Cayman Islands) Justin Byles
- (Cayman Islands) Joshwa Campbell
- (Cuba) Michael Camejo
- (Cuba) Aniel Casanova
- (Cuba) Cristian Mendoza
- (Curaçao) Damienthly Bernardina
- (Curaçao) Luigi Inesia
- (Curaçao) Tarino Marchena
- (Dominica) Ajani Richards
- (Dominica) Keeyan Thomas
- (El Salvador) Néstor Delgado
- (El Salvador) Nelson Díaz
- (El Salvador) Daniel España
- (El Salvador) Christopher Guardado
- (El Salvador) Darwin López
- (El Salvador) Walter Menjívar
- (Grenada) David Juba
- (Guatemala) Axel de la Cruz
- (Guatemala) Rudy Muñoz
- (Guatemala) Héctor Prillwitz
- (Guatemala) Justin Racancoj
- (Guatemala) Selvin Sagastume
- (Guyana) Matrim Martin
- (Haiti) Joseph Belmar
- (Haiti) Chris Jean-Francois
- (Haiti) Louis Isaie
- (Haiti) Schneilorens Lebrun
- (Haiti) Jaylen-Andre Vilsaint
- (Jamaica) Ronaldo Barrett
- (Jamaica) Romain Blake
- (Jamaica) Ashton Gordon
- (Jamaica) Robino Gordon
- (Jamaica) Fabian Reynolds
- (Jamaica) Nicholas Simmonds
- (Martinique) Hervinsonn Gervais
- (Martinique) Awom Guillaume
- (Martinique) Kerane Léria
- (Nicaragua) Izamuel Martínez
- (Nicaragua) Fredy Ortiz
- (Puerto Rico) Adrian Biaggi
- (Puerto Rico) Daniel Cruz
- (Puerto Rico) Benjamin Donato
- (Puerto Rico) Luis Medina
- (Puerto Rico) Fabian Menendez
- (Puerto Rico) Sebastián Otero
- (Collectivity of Saint Martin) Jaheem Joe
- (Collectivity of Saint Martin) Brenton Peters
- (Saint Vincent and the Grenadines) Frankroy Cain
- (Suriname) Jereno van Gom
- (Suriname) Girayno Kluivert
- (Suriname) Yamano Olfers
- (Suriname) Jermaine Rijssel
- (Trinidad and Tobago) Rio Cardines
- (Trinidad and Tobago) Cody Cooper
- (Trinidad and Tobago) Derrel Garcia
- (Turks and Caicos Islands) Hency Gedeon
- (Turks and Caicos Islands) Christopher Louisy
- (Turks and Caicos Islands) Emmanuel Martin
- (Turks and Caicos Islands) Cory Williams

1 own goal

- (Saint Kitts and Nevis) Kejorn Wattley (against Puerto Rico)
- (Collectivity of Saint Martin) Tyler Flanders (against Guatemala)
