= 2025 UNCAF U-19 Tournament =

UNCAF FIFA Forward Men's U-19 Tournament

Tournament details
- Host country: Panama
- City: Panama City
- Dates: 5–11 December 2025
- Teams: 8 (from 2 sub-confederations)
- Venue: 1 (in 1 host city)

Final positions
- Champions: Costa Rica (2nd title)
- Runners-up: Panama
- Third place: Honduras
- Fourth place: Costa Rica

Tournament statistics
- Matches played: 16
- Goals scored: 53 (3.31 per match)
- Top scorer(s): (Guatemala) Selvin Sagastume (Puerto Rico) Eddiel Márquez (4 goals each)

The 2025 UNCAF U-19 Tournament, also known as UNCAF FIFA Forward Men's U-19 Tournament (Spanish: Torneo UNCAF Sub-19 FIFA Forward), was the fourth edition of the UNCAF U-19 Tournament, the biennial international youth football tournament organised by the Central American Football Union (UNCAF) for the men's under-19 national teams of the Central America region. It was held in Panama City, Panama between 5 and 11 December 2024.

The tournament's purpose is for the UNCAF teams to prepare for the upcoming 2026 CONCACAF U-20 Championship but it is not a qualifier. Originally planned to take place in early 2026, this edition has been brought forward to December 2025.

Costa Rica won their second UNCAF U-19 title by beating Panama 4–3 on penalties following a 0–0 draw in the final. Defending champions Guatemala failed to retain their title and finished fourth after losing to Honduras 2–4 on penalties after a 0–0 draw in the third-place match.

== Entrants ==
Six of the seven UNCAF member national teams entered the tournament, with Belize absent for the first time. This edition featured two guests from the Caribbean Football Union (CFU), Cuba and Puerto Rico, in order to complete the eight participating teams given Belize's absence.

| Team | App | Previous best performance |
|---|---|---|
| Costa Rica | 4th | Champions (2022) |
| Cuba (invitee) | 2nd | Eighth place (2024) |
| El Salvador | 4th | Runners-up (2022) |
| Guatemala (holders) | 4th | Champions (2018, 2024) |
| Honduras | 4th | Third place (2024) |
| Nicaragua | 4th | Fourth place (2022) |
| Panama (hosts) | 4th | Runners-up (2018, 2024) |
| Puerto Rico (invitee) | 2nd | Seventh place (2022) |

== Venues ==
It was the first time that Panama hosted the tournament. All games took place on the football courts at the Yappy Park sports complex, owned by the Panama City club, and at the COS Sports Plaza, owned by Plaza Amador.

== Groups composition ==
The groups were announced by the Panamanian Football Federation on 23 November 2025, while the match schedule was revealed by UNCAF on 4 December 2025. No previous draw was announced, however, the hosts Panama and the title holders Guatemala were seeded and assigned to the head of the groups A and B, respectively.

The groups were conformed as follows:

Group A
| Pos | Team |
|---|---|
| A1 | Panama |
| A2 | Honduras |
| A4 | Nicaragua |
| A3 | Cuba |

Group B
| Pos | Team |
|---|---|
| B1 | Guatemala |
| B2 | Costa Rica |
| B3 | El Salvador |
| B4 | Puerto Rico |

== Group stage ==
All match times are in PAT (UTC−5), as listed by UNCAF.

=== Group A ===
| Pos | Team | Pld | W | D | L | GF | GA | GD | Pts | Qualification |
|---|---|---|---|---|---|---|---|---|---|---|
| 1 | Panama (H) | 3 | 3 | 0 | 0 | 6 | 0 | +6 | 9 | Final |
| 2 | Honduras | 3 | 2 | 0 | 1 | 8 | 4 | +4 | 6 | Third place match |
| 3 | Nicaragua | 3 | 1 | 0 | 2 | 2 | 4 | −2 | 3 | Fifth place match |
| 4 | Cuba (G) | 3 | 0 | 0 | 3 | 2 | 10 | −8 | 0 | Seventh place match |

Source: UNCAF
(G) Guests; (H) Hosts
5 December 2025
9:30

| Honduras | 2–0 | Nicaragua |
|---|---|---|
| Gutiérrez 65'; Arriola 90+1' |

COS Sports Plaza, Panama City
Referee: Cristopher Ramírez (Costa Rica)
5 December 2025
15:00

| Panama | 2–0 | Cuba |
|---|---|---|
| James 47'; Vergara 86' | Report |

COS Sports Plaza, Panama City
Referee: Lenin Pérez (Guatemala)

7 December 2025
9:30

| Cuba | 1–6 | Honduras |
|---|---|---|
| Reinoso 32' | | Palacios 24'; Gutiérrez 35'; Martínez 40'; Contreras 45+2'; Flores 76', 84' |

COS Sports Plaza, Panama City
Referee: Victor Caliz (Belize)
7 December 2025
15:00

| Panama | 1–0 | Nicaragua |
|---|---|---|
| James 81' (pen.) | Report |

COS Sports Plaza, Panama City
Referee: Jesús Aguirre (El Salvador)

9 December 2025
9:30

| Nicaragua | 2–1 | Cuba |
|---|---|---|
| Gutiérrez 13'; Uriarte 64' (pen.) | | Reinoso 30' |

COS Sports Plaza, Panama City
Referee: Kevin Ulloa (Honduras)
9 December 2025
15:00

| Panama | 3–0 | Honduras |
|---|---|---|
| Vergara 22'; López 79'; Richards 90+1' | Report |

COS Sports Plaza, Panama City
Referee: Figo López (Mexico)

=== Group B ===
| Pos | Team | Pld | W | D | L | GF | GA | GD | Pts | Qualification |
|---|---|---|---|---|---|---|---|---|---|---|
| 1 | Costa Rica | 3 | 2 | 1 | 0 | 8 | 5 | +3 | 7 | Final |
| 2 | Guatemala | 3 | 2 | 0 | 1 | 8 | 2 | +6 | 6 | Third place match |
| 3 | Puerto Rico (G) | 3 | 0 | 2 | 1 | 4 | 8 | −4 | 2 | Fifth place match |
| 4 | El Salvador | 3 | 0 | 1 | 2 | 4 | 9 | −5 | 1 | Seventh place match |

Source: UNCAF
(G) Guests
5 December 2025
9:30

| El Salvador | 2–4 | Costa Rica |
|---|---|---|
| Díaz 15'; Miranda 26' | | Y. Leal 41', 90+3'; Estrada 55'; Guevara 85' |

Yappy Park, Panama City
Referee: Kevin Ulloa (Honduras)
5 December 2025
15:00

| Guatemala | 4–0 | Puerto Rico |
|---|---|---|
| Sagastume 49' (pen.), 58' (pen.); Guzmán 65'; Burgos 86' (o.g.) |

Yappy Park, Panama City
Referee: Alainy Santana (Cuba)

7 December 2025
9:30

| Costa Rica | 2–2 | Puerto Rico |
|---|---|---|
| Garro 23' (pen.); Y. Leal 45+2' | | Márquez 73', 78' |

Yappy Park, Panama City
Referee: Guilmarth Matus (Nicaragua)
7 December 2025
15:00

| El Salvador | 0–3 | Guatemala |
|---|---|---|
| | | Sagastume 31' (pen.); Pacay 52'; Márquez 85' |

Yappy Park, Panama City
Referee: Figo López (Mexico)

9 December 2025
9:30

| Puerto Rico | 2–2 | El Salvador |
|---|---|---|
| Vicentti 24'; Márquez 67' | | Roque 4'; Ortiz 83' |

Yappy Park, Panama City
Referee: Jeremy Phillips (Panama)
9 December 2025
15:00

| Guatemala | 1–2 | Costa Rica |
|---|---|---|
| Sagastume 70' | | Estrada 32'; Palmer 49' |

Yappy Park, Panama City
Referee: Jesús Aguirre (El Salvador)

== Knockout stage ==
All match times are in PAT (UTC−5), as listed by UNCAF.

=== Seventh place match ===
11 December 2025
9:30

| El Salvador | 3–5 | Cuba |
|---|---|---|
| Arnold 54', 81' (pen.); Miranda 56' | | L. Díaz 12'; Ricardo 39'; Rojas 45+2'; Brayan 85', 90+2' |

Yappy Park, Panama City
Referee: Cristopher Ramírez (Costa Rica)

=== Fifth place match ===
11 December 2025
15:00

| Nicaragua | 1–2 | Puerto Rico |
|---|---|---|
| Uriarte 22' (pen.) | | Vicentti 6'; Márquez 81' |

Yappy Park, Panama City
Referee: Alainy Santana (Cuba)

=== Third place match ===
11 December 2025
9:30

| Guatemala | 0–0 | Honduras |
Penalties
| Sagastume (penalty missed); Samayoa (penalty scored); Figueroa (penalty scored); Rivas (penalty missed) | 2–4 | (penalty scored) Gutiérrez; (penalty scored) Palacios; (penalty scored) Salazar; (penalty scored) Flores |

COS Sports Plaza, Panama City
Referee: Victor Caliz (Belize)

=== Final ===
11 December 2025
15:00

| Panama | 0–0 | Costa Rica |
|---|---|---|
| | Report |
Penalties
| Vergara (penalty scored); Perea (penalty scored); James (penalty missed); Richards (penalty missed); Gómez (penalty scored) | 3–4 | (penalty scored) Sosa; (penalty scored) Estrada; (penalty missed) Leal; (penalty scored) E. Hernández; (penalty scored) Garro |

COS Sports Plaza, Panama City
Referee: Lenin Pérez (Guatemala)

== Goalscorers ==
There were 53 goals scored in 16 matches, for an average of 3.31 goals per match.

4 goals

- (Guatemala) Selvin Sagastume
- (Puerto Rico) Eddiel Márquez

3 goals

- (Costa Rica) Yamil Leal

2 goals

- (Costa Rica) Kionell Estrada
- (Cuba) Pedro Brayan
- (Cuba) Didier Reinoso
- (El Salvador) Gabriel Arnold
- (El Salvador) Uriel Miranda
- (Honduras) David Flores
- (Honduras) José Gutiérrez
- (Nicaragua) Juban Uriarte
- (Panama) Ángel James
- (Panama) Josué Vergara
- (Puerto Rico) Isaiah Vicentti

1 goal

- (Costa Rica) Dax Palmer
- (Costa Rica) David Garro
- (Costa Rica) Edmilson Guevara
- (Cuba) Lázaro Díaz
- (Cuba) Jaddiel Ricardo
- (Cuba) Alexandro Rojas
- (El Salvador) Wilber Díaz
- (El Salvador) Johann Ortiz
- (El Salvador) Jeferson Roque
- (Guatemala) Francisco Guzmán
- (Guatemala) Ricardo Márquez
- (Guatemala) Justin Pacay
- (Honduras) Yeison Arriola
- (Honduras) Jaidyn Contreras
- (Honduras) Juan Martínez
- (Honduras) Yochua Palacios
- (Nicaragua) Diego Gutiérrez
- (Panama) Estevis López
- (Panama) Moisés Richards

1 own goal

- (Puerto Rico) Adrián Burgos (against Guatemala)

== Final ranking ==
Per statistical convention in football, matches decided in extra time were counted as wins and losses, while matches decided by penalty shoot-out were counted as draws.

| Pos | Team | Pld | W | D | L | GF | GA | GD | Pts |
|---|---|---|---|---|---|---|---|---|---|
| 1st place, gold medalist(s) | Costa Rica (C) | 4 | 2 | 2 | 0 | 8 | 5 | +3 | 8 |
| 2nd place, silver medalist(s) | Panama (H) | 4 | 3 | 1 | 0 | 6 | 0 | +6 | 10 |
| 3rd place, bronze medalist(s) | Honduras | 4 | 2 | 1 | 1 | 8 | 4 | +4 | 7 |
| 4 | Guatemala | 4 | 2 | 1 | 1 | 8 | 2 | +6 | 7 |
| 5 | Puerto Rico (G) | 4 | 1 | 2 | 1 | 6 | 9 | −3 | 5 |
| 6 | Nicaragua | 4 | 1 | 0 | 3 | 3 | 6 | −3 | 3 |
| 7 | Cuba (G) | 4 | 1 | 0 | 3 | 7 | 13 | −6 | 3 |
| 8 | El Salvador | 4 | 0 | 1 | 3 | 7 | 14 | −7 | 1 |

Source: UNCAF
(C) Champions; (G) Guests; (H) Hosts
