= Parish Land FC =

- Full name: Parish Land Football Club
- Founded: 1975; 51 years ago
- Ground: Parish Land Playing Field
- Capacity: 250
- President: Kemar Ward
- Manager: Marcellus Bobb
- League: Barbados Premier League
- 2026: 1st, Division One (Promoted)

Parish Land FC is a Barbadian football club based in Parish Land, Christ Church that currently competes in the Barbados Premier League, the top tier of football in Barbados.

== Stadium ==
Parish Land FC's home ground is the Parish Land Playing Field. In late 2025, the venue underwent a major renovation as part of the Ministry of Youth, Sports and Community Empowerment's Mini Stadia Initiative. At completion, local Member of Parliament Wilfred Abrahams described the stadium as "top-class" and "one of the best facilities in the whole of Barbados".

== History ==
Parish Land FC was established in 1975 and places a heavy emphasis on youth development. Until 2015, the highest level the club had reached was the Division One, but had been relegated twice. Following a long absence, the club returned to the Barbados Football Association league system in 2024, beginning in the Division Three. That season, the club earned immediate promotion to the Division Two. The club began its 2024 Prime Minister's Cup campaign with a 5–0 victory over Premier League club St. Andrew Lions FC. Parish Land reached the knockout rounds of the competition before being eliminated by Wotton FC 0–3 in the Round of 16.

In 2025, the club finished as runners-up in the Division Two and were promoted back to the Division One for the following season, along with champions Cave Hill FC, after just one season in the league. In preparation for the upcoming campaign in the second tier, the club signed established attackers such as Barbados international Janash Jaunai from Barbados Premier League champions Weymouth Wales and Jamal Watson-Cummins from Paradise FC. Throughout the 2026 season, Parish Land was consistently in the top two spots in the league table, in contention for the title mainly with Pro-Shottas. The club clinched a second consecutive promotion and third in four seasons with one match remaining in the schedule, sitting two points behind league leaders Pro-Shottas. One the final matchday, Parish Land leapfrogged Pro-Shottas to win the league title as the club defeated Potential Ballers FC 9-1 while Pro Shottas fell 1–2 to Empire Club.

== Recent seasons ==
Key

Champion Runners-up 3rd place

Season	League							Notes
Season	Div.	Pos.	Pl.	W	D	L	P	Notes
2024	IV							promoted to Barbados Division Two
2025	III	1st (Group B)	18	15	1	2	46	promoted to Barbados Division One
2026	II	1st	24	17	5	2	56	promoted to Barbados Premier League
2027	I							
