= 2022 UNCAF U-19 Tournament =

UNCAF FIFA Forward Men's U-19 Tournament

Tournament details
- Host country: Belize
- City: Belmopan
- Dates: 24–30 April 2022
- Teams: 8 (from 2 sub-confederations)
- Venue(s): 2 (in 1 host city)

Final positions
- Champions: Costa Rica (1st title)
- Runners-up: El Salvador
- Third place: Panama
- Fourth place: Nicaragua

Tournament statistics
- Matches played: 16
- Goals scored: 57 (3.56 per match)
- Top scorer(s): (Guatemala) Jefry Bantes (Nicaragua) Widman Talavera (Puerto Rico) Jeremy de León (3 goals each)

The 2022 UNCAF U-19 Tournament, also known as UNCAF FIFA Forward Men's U-19 Tournament (Spanish: Torneo UNCAF Sub-19 FIFA Forward), was the second edition of the UNCAF U-19 Tournament, the biennial international youth football tournament organised by the Central American Football Union (UNCAF) for the men's under-19 national teams of the Central America region. It was held in Belmopan, Belize between 24 and 30 April 2022.

Guatemala were the defending champions having won the title in 2018, but was unable to retain the title and finished in sixth place. Costa Rica won their first tournament title after beating El Salvador by a 5–4 score in the final.

== Entrants ==
All seven UNCAF member national teams entered the tournament in addition to Puerto Rico which participated as a guest from the Caribbean Football Union (CFU).

Team	Appearance	Previous best performance
Belize (hosts)	2nd	Seventh place (2018)
Costa Rica	2nd	Third place (2018)
El Salvador	2nd	Sixth place (2018)
Guatemala (holders)	2nd	Champions (2018)
Honduras	2nd	Fourth place (2018)
Nicaragua	2nd	Fifth place (2018)
Panama	2nd	Runners-up (2018)
Puerto Rico (invitee)	1st	None

== Venues ==
Belmopan
Isidoro Beaton Stadium	FFB Stadium
Capacity: 2,500	Capacity: 5,200
	FFB Stadium

Belize was named as host country of the tournament at the XX UNCAF Ordinary Congress meeting held on 2 December 2021. The Isidoro Beaton and FFB stadiums, both located in Belmopan, hosted the matches.

== Composition of the groups ==
The groups and match schedule were revealed on 7 April 2022. No previous draw was announced, however the hosts Belize and the title holders Guatemala were seeded and assigned to the head of the groups A and B respectively.

The groups were conformed as follows:

Group A
Pos	Team
A1	Belize
A2	Honduras
A4	El Salvador
A3	Nicaragua

Group B
Pos	Team
B1	Guatemala
B2	Panama
B3	Costa Rica
B4	Puerto Rico

== Match officials ==
On 23 April 2022, UNCAF announced a total of 10 referees and 10 assistant referees appointed for the tournament.

Association	Referees	Assistant referees
Belize	Efren Guy	Juan Colindres
Costa Rica	Pablo Camacho	Danny Sojo
Cuba	Anthony Montero	
El Salvador	Waldir García	Carlos Vargas and Emilio Villalta
Guatemala	Christofer Corado and José Fuentes	Axel Pérez
Honduras	Julio Guity	Luis Paz and José Nahun Arauz
Mexico	Yonathan Peinado	Daniel Martínez
Nicaragua	Félix Mojica	Alfredo Chávez
Panama	José Carrasco	Jorginho Vásquez

== Group stage ==
All match times are in CST (UTC−6), as listed by UNCAF.

=== Group A ===
Pos	Team	Pld	W	D	L	GF	GA	GD	Pts	Qualification
1	El Salvador	3	3	0	0	8	1	+7	9	Final
2	Nicaragua	3	1	1	1	4	4	0	4	Third place match
3	Honduras	3	1	0	2	3	4	−1	3	Fifth place match
4	Belize (H)	3	0	1	2	3	9	−6	1	Seventh place match

Source: UNCAF
(H) Hosts
24 April 2022
16:15

Honduras	0–2	El Salvador
		Benítez 11'; Osorio 90'

FFB Stadium, Belmopan
Referee: Yonathan Peinado (Mexico)
24 April 2022
19:00

Belize	2–2	Nicaragua
Daniels 15'; Reneau 84' (pen.)		Corrales 3', 53'

FFB Stadium, Belmopan
Referee: Pablo Camacho (Costa Rica)

26 April 2022
16:15

Nicaragua	2–1	Honduras
Talavera 68', 74' (pen.)		Carrasco 90+3'

FFB Stadium, Belmopan
Referee: Anthony Montero (Cuba)
26 April 2022
19:00

Belize	1–5	El Salvador
Reneau 67'		Cerritos 17'; Arévalo 25'; Benítez 32'; Esquivel 60'; Gil 90+2'

FFB Stadium, Belmopan
Referee: José Fuentes (Guatemala)

30 April 2022
16:15

El Salvador	1–0	Nicaragua
Orellana 7'

FFB Stadium, Belmopan
Referee: José Carrasco (Panama)
30 April 2022
19:00

Belize	0–2	Honduras
		Núñez 16'; Contreras 90+2' (pen.)

FFB Stadium, Belmopan
Referee: Christofer Corado (Guatemala)

=== Group B ===
Pos	Team	Pld	W	D	L	GF	GA	GD	Pts	Qualification
1	Costa Rica	3	1	2	0	5	2	+3	5	Final
2	Panama	3	1	2	0	6	4	+2	5	Third place match
3	Guatemala	3	1	1	1	5	5	0	4	Fifth place match
4	Puerto Rico (G)	3	0	1	2	5	10	−5	1	Seventh place match

Source: UNCAF
(G) Guests
24 April 2022
16:15

Panama	0–0	Costa Rica

Isidoro Beaton Stadium, Belmopan
Referee: Julio Guity (Honduras)
24 April 2022
19:00

Guatemala	3–1	Puerto Rico
Gaitán 17' (pen.); Bantes 74'; Muñoz 90+2'		Silva ?'

Isidoro Beaton Stadium, Belmopan
Referee: Félix Mojica (Nicaragua)

26 April 2022
16:15

Puerto Rico	3–3	Panama
de León 9', 86'; Rivera 12'		Mosquera 45'; Vega 71'; Cedeño 83'

Isidoro Beaton Stadium, Belmopan
Referee: Efren Guy (Belize)
26 April 2022
19:00

Costa Rica	1–1	Guatemala
Rodríguez 10'		Bantes 89'

Isidoro Beaton Stadium, Belmopan
Referee: Waldir García (El Salvador)

30 April 2022
16:15

Costa Rica	4–1	Puerto Rico
Johnson 14'; Cane 22'; Soto 74'; Segura 87'		Rivera 62'

Isidoro Beaton Stadium, Belmopan
Referee: Yonathan Peinado (Mexico)
30 April 2022
19:00

Guatemala	1–3	Panama
Bantes 84'		Tejada 45+4' (pen.); Gaitán 90+1' (o.g.); Tello 90+6'

Isidoro Beaton Stadium, Belmopan
Referee: Julio Guity (Honduras)

== Knockout stage ==
All match times are in CST (UTC−6), as listed by UNCAF.

=== Seventh place match ===
30 April 2022
16:15

Belize	1–2	Puerto Rico
Higinio 9'		de León 22'; Mateo 74'

Isidoro Beaton Stadium, Belmopan
Referee: Christofer Corado (Guatemala)

=== Fifth place match ===
30 April 2022
19:00

Guatemala	0–0	Honduras
Penalties
Gaitán (penalty scored); Bantes (penalty scored); Franco (penalty scored); Arana (penalty missed); Corado (penalty scored)	4–5	(penalty scored) Contreras; (penalty scored) Zuñiga; (penalty scored) Kelly; (penalty scored) Núñez; (penalty scored) Carrasco

Isidoro Beaton Stadium, Belmopan
Referee: Pablo Camacho (Costa Rica)

=== Third place match ===
30 April 2022
16:15

Panama	3–3	Nicaragua
Gorday 16', 57' (pen.); Pineda 74' (o.g.)		Batiz 37'; Herrera 45+1'; Talavera 68' (pen.)
Penalties
Vega (penalty missed); Cedeño (penalty scored); Ruíz (penalty scored); Alba (penalty scored); Gorday (penalty scored)	4–2	(penalty scored) Kirklan; (penalty missed) Soto; (penalty scored) Herrera; (penalty missed) Salinas

FFB Stadium, Belmopan
Referee: Waldir García (El Salvador)

=== Final ===
30 April 2022
19:00

El Salvador	4–5	Costa Rica
Gil 31'; Rivas 38', 53'; Cruz 48'		Arroyo 21'; Alcócer 56', 82'; Soto 63' (pen.); Cano 90' (o.g.)

FFB Stadium, Belmopan
Referee: Félix Mojica (Nicaragua)

== Goalscorers ==
There were 57 goals scored in 16 matches, for an average of 3.56 goals per match.

3 goals

- (Guatemala) Jefry Bantes
- (Nicaragua) Widman Talavera
- (Puerto Rico) Jeremy de León

2 goals

- (Belize) Heldon Reneau
- (Costa Rica) Josimar Alcócer
- (Costa Rica) Andrey Soto
- (El Salvador) Hamilton Benítez
- (El Salvador) Mayer Gil
- (El Salvador) Eduardo Rivas
- (Nicaragua) Darwin Corrales
- (Panama) Ricardo Gorday
- (Puerto Rico) Wilfredo Rivera

1 goal

- (Belize) Daijon Daniels
- (Belize) Kevin Higinio
- (Costa Rica) Fabián Arroyo
- (Costa Rica) Ryan Cane
- (Costa Rica) Shawn Johnson
- (Costa Rica) Doryan Rodríguez
- (Costa Rica) Berny Segura
- (El Salvador) Ronald Arévalo
- (El Salvador) Mauricio Cerritos
- (El Salvador) Daniel Cruz
- (El Salvador) Isaac Esquivel
- (El Salvador) César Orellana
- (El Salvador) Harold Osorio
- (Guatemala) Mathius Gaitán
- (Guatemala) Rudy Muñoz
- (Honduras) Miguel Carrasco
- (Honduras) Yeison Contreras
- (Honduras) Jafet Núñez
- (Nicaragua) Keylon Batiz
- (Nicaragua) Cristhian Herrera
- (Panama) Edward Cedeño
- (Panama) Rafael Mosquera
- (Panama) Leonel Tejada
- (Panama) Rodrigo Tello
- (Panama) Rodolfo Vega
- (Puerto Rico) Jan Mateo
- (Puerto Rico) Ian Silva

1 own goal

- (El Salvador) Alejandro Cano (against Costa Rica)
- (Guatemala) Mathius Gaitán (against Panama)
- (Nicaragua) Dylan Pineda (against Panama)

== Final ranking ==
Per statistical convention in football, matches decided in extra time were counted as wins and losses, while matches decided by penalty shoot-out were counted as draws.

Pos	Team	Pld	W	D	L	GF	GA	GD	Pts
1	Costa Rica	4	2	2	0	10	6	+4	8
2	El Salvador	4	3	0	1	12	6	+6	9
3	Panama	4	1	3	0	9	7	+2	6
4	Nicaragua	4	1	2	1	7	7	0	5
5	Honduras	4	1	1	2	3	4	−1	4
6	Guatemala	4	1	2	1	5	5	0	5
7	Puerto Rico (G)	4	1	1	2	7	11	−4	4
8	Belize (H)	4	0	1	3	4	11	−7	1

Source: UNCAF
(G) Guests; (H) Hosts
