= Marvin Ávila Jr =

Guatemalan footballer

Personal information
- Full name: Marvin Alexander Ávila Veliz Junior
- Date of birth: 17 March 2008 (age 18)
- Place of birth: Guatemala City, Guatemala
- Height: 1.78 m (5 ft 10 in)
- Positions: Forward; attacking midfielder

Team information
- Current team: São Paulo

Youth career
- 2014–2016: El Bosque
- 2017–2018: Azucareros Jr
- 2019–2020: Academia Cartogua
- 2021–2022: Santa Lucía B
- 2026–: São Paulo

Senior career*
Years	Team	Apps	(Gls)
2023	Santa Lucía	1	(0)
2024–2026	Antigua	31	(1)

International career^{‡}
2023	Guatemala U15	8	(12)
2024	Guatemala U16	4	(7)
2025–	Guatemala U17	6	(6)
2024–	Guatemala U20	13	(3)
2026–	Guatemala	1	(0)
Medal record
Men's football
Representing Guatemala
UNCAF U-19 Tournament
Winner	2024 Honduras
UNCAF U-16 Tournament
Winner	2024 Costa Rica
UNCAF U-15 Tournament
Winner	2023 Costa Rica
- * Club domestic league appearances and goals as of 13:38, 30 August 2026 (UTC) ‡ National team caps and goals as of 18 January 2026

Marvin Alexander Ávila Veliz Junior (born 17 March 2008) is a Guatemalan professional footballer who plays as a forward or right winger for the youth team of São Paulo and the Guatemala national team.

== Early years ==
Born in Guatemala City, Ávila is the son of former footballer Marvin Ávila. He began his youth career in 2014, playing for teams including El Bosque and Azucareros Jr before reaching Santa Lucía, where he made his first-team debut on 8 April 2023.

== Club career ==
=== Antigua GFC ===
Ávila debuted for Antigua GFC on 31 January 2024 at age 15 against Municipal, contributing an assist. He scored his first league goal shortly after against Deportivo Zacapa.

=== São Paulo ===
Following his performances in Guatemala, Ávila joined the under-20 squad of Brazilian club São Paulo FC to continue his development.

== International career ==
Ávila has been a prominent figure in Guatemalan youth teams, including winning the 2023 UNCAF U-15 Tournament as top scorer and competing in the CONCACAF U-15 Championship. He made his senior international debut for Guatemala on 18 January 2026, in a friendly against Canada.

== Style of play ==
Ávila is described as a playmaker capable of playing as a forward or on the wing. He is recognized for his skill, low center of gravity, and goal-scoring ability.

== Career statistics ==
=== Club ===
As of 20 November 2024

Appearances and goals by club, season and competition
Club	Season	League			Total	
Club	Season	Division	Apps	Goals	Apps	Goals
Santa Lucía	2022–23	Liga Bantrab	1	0	1	0
Antigua	2023–24	Liga Bantrab	18	1	18	1
Career total			19	1	19	1

== Honours ==
Guatemala U15

- UNCAF U-15 Tournament: 2023

Guatemala U16

- UNCAF U-16 Tournament: 2024

Guatemala U19

- UNCAF U-19 Tournament: 2024
