= Barbados Division Three =

- Country: Barbados
- Confederation: CONCACAF
- Number of clubs: 19 (in 3 zones)
- Level on pyramid: 4
- Promotion to: Barbados Division Two
- Domestic cup: Barbados FA Cup

The Barbados Division Three is the fourth-tier league of football in Barbados. It is organized by the Barbados Football Association.

== List of Champions ==
Season	Zone 1	Zone 2	Zone 3	Zone 4	Play-off Champion
2013	Road View United FC	Rendezvous FC	Tudor Bridge Bombers FC	Empire Club	Empire Club
2014	St. Andrew Lions FC	Wotton FC	Pro-Shottas	N/A	Wotton FC
2015	Potential Ballers FC	Red & White United	Barbados Defence Force FC	N/A	Potential Ballers FC
2016	Checker Hall FC	Hothersal Turning FC	N/A	N/A	Checker Hall FC
2017	Police SC	Route 16 United FC	N/A	N/A	Police SC
2018	Chickmont FC	Benfica Sports Club	N/A	N/A	N/A
2019	Technique FC	Cosmos FC	Villa United FC	N/A	Technique FC
2020	Not held because of COVID-19 pandemic				
2021	Not held because of COVID-19 pandemic				
2022	Not held because of COVID-19 pandemic				
2023					
