= 2024 UNCAF U-19 Tournament =

UNCAF FIFA Forward Men's U-19 Tournament

Tournament details
- Host country: Honduras
- City: Tegucigalpa
- Dates: 19–25 January 2024
- Teams: 8 (from 2 sub-confederations)
- Venue: 1 (in 1 host city)

Final positions
- Champions: Guatemala (2nd title)
- Runners-up: Panama
- Third place: Honduras
- Fourth place: Costa Rica

Tournament statistics
- Matches played: 16
- Goals scored: 64 (4 per match)
- Top scorer(s): (Costa Rica) Claudio Montero (6 goals)

The 2024 UNCAF U-19 Tournament, also known as UNCAF FIFA Forward Men's U-19 Tournament (Spanish: Torneo UNCAF Sub-19 FIFA Forward), was the third edition of the UNCAF U-19 Tournament, the biennial international youth football tournament organised by the Central American Football Union (UNCAF) for the men's under-19 national teams of the Central America region. It was held in Tegucigalpa, Honduras between 19 and 25 January 2024.

The tournament's purpose is for the UNCAF teams to prepare for the upcoming 2024 CONCACAF U-20 Championship but it is not a qualifier.

Guatemala won their second UNCAF U-19 title by beating Panama in the final 3–0 on penalties following a 0–0 draw in regular time. Hosts Honduras finished in third place after defeating title holder Costa Rica 3–2 in the third place match.

== Entrants ==
All seven UNCAF member national teams entered the tournament in addition to Cuba which participated as a guest from the Caribbean Football Union (CFU).

Team	App	Previous best performance
Belize	3rd	Seventh place (2018)
Costa Rica (holders)	3rd	Champions (2022)
Cuba (invitee)	1st	None
El Salvador	3rd	Runners-up (2022)
Guatemala	3rd	Champions (2018)
Honduras (hosts)	3rd	Fourth place (2018)
Nicaragua	3rd	Fourth place (2022)
Panama	3rd	Runners-up (2018)

== Venues ==
It was the second time that Honduras hosted the tournament, having also hosted the inaugural edition in 2018. All games took place on the courts of the Centro de Alto Rendimiento José Rafael Ferrari, home of the Honduran club Olimpia, in Tegucigalpa.

== Groups composition ==
The groups and match schedule were revealed by UNCAF on 16 January 2024, however, they had been previously published by the Panamanian Football Federation on 6 January 2024. No previous draw was announced, however, the hosts Honduras and the title holders Costa Rica were seeded and assigned to the head of the groups A and B, respectively.

The groups were conformed as follows:

Group A
Pos	Team
A1	Honduras
A2	Panama
A4	El Salvador
A3	Nicaragua

Group B
Pos	Team
B1	Costa Rica
B2	Guatemala
B3	Cuba
B4	Belize

== Group stage ==
All match times are in HNT (UTC−6), as listed by UNCAF.

=== Group A ===
Pos	Team	Pld	W	D	L	GF	GA	GD	Pts	Qualification
1	Panama	3	3	0	0	8	0	+8	9	Final
2	Honduras (H)	3	2	0	1	8	3	+5	6	Third place match
3	Nicaragua	3	1	0	2	5	8	−3	3	Fifth place match
4	El Salvador	3	0	0	3	2	12	−10	0	Seventh place match

Source: UNCAF
(H) Hosts
19 January 2024
11:10

Panama	3–0	El Salvador
Obando 46'; Hernández 82'; Garibaldo 84'	Report

CAR José Rafael Ferrari – court 2, Tegucigalpa
Referee: Jesús Montero (Costa Rica)
19 January 2024
15:10

Honduras	4–0	Nicaragua
Paguada 28', 52'; Osorto 41'; Pérez 90+1'	Report

CAR José Rafael Ferrari – court 1, Tegucigalpa
Referee: Modesto Hierrezuelo (Cuba)

21 January 2024
11:10

Nicaragua	0–4	Panama
	Report	Obando 17'; Mosquera 35' (pen.); Hernández 56'; Rodríguez 71' (pen.)

CAR José Rafael Ferrari – court 3, Tegucigalpa
Referee: Ismael López (Mexico)
21 January 2024
15:10

Honduras	4–2	El Salvador
Zepeda 2'; Tatum 12'; Ponce 54' (pen.); Mejía 72'	Report	Delgado 14'; Argueta 67'

CAR José Rafael Ferrari – court 3, Tegucigalpa
Referee: Diego Ojer (Guatemala)

23 January 2024
11:10

El Salvador	0–5	Nicaragua
	Report	Martínez 24'; Bello 45'; Cayasso 82'; Ortíz 90'; Castillo 90+3'

CAR José Rafael Ferrari – court 2, Tegucigalpa
Referee: Victor Caliz (Belize)
23 January 2024
15:10

Honduras	0–1	Panama
	Report	Garibaldo 3'

CAR José Rafael Ferrari – court 1, Tegucigalpa
Referee: Ismael López (Mexico)

=== Group B ===
Pos	Team	Pld	W	D	L	GF	GA	GD	Pts	Qualification
1	Guatemala	3	3	0	0	12	3	+9	9	Final
2	Costa Rica	3	1	1	1	10	6	+4	4	Third place match
3	Belize	3	1	0	2	3	14	−11	3	Fifth place match
4	Cuba (G)	3	0	1	2	3	5	−2	1	Seventh place match

Source: UNCAF
(G) Guests
19 January 2024
11:00

Guatemala	2–1	Cuba
Sagastume (pen.); Zahran	Report	Pérez

CAR José Rafael Ferrari – court 3, Tegucigalpa
Referee: James Salinas (Honduras)
19 January 2024
15:00

Costa Rica	7–1	Belize
Ramírez; Pelayo (o.g.); Montero; Jiménez; Barahona	Report	Serano

CAR José Rafael Ferrari – court 3, Tegucigalpa
Referee: Melvin Matamoros (Honduras)

21 January 2024
11:00

Belize	0–6	Guatemala
	Report	Vásquez 27', 49', 65'; Sagastume 45+2'; Ávila 73', 75'

CAR José Rafael Ferrari – court 2, Tegucigalpa
Referee: Ricardo Reid (Panama)
21 January 2024
15:00

Cuba	1–1	Costa Rica
Torres 88'	Report	Montero 86' (pen.)

Referee: César Nolasco (El Salvador)

23 January 2024
11:00

Belize	2–1	Cuba
Martinez 28'; Taegar 45+2' (pen.)	Report	Rodríguez 1'

CAR José Rafael Ferrari – court 3, Tegucigalpa
Referee: Eliel Aguirre (Nicaragua)
23 January 2024
15:00

Costa Rica	2–4	Guatemala
Montero 29', 55' (pen.)	Report	De la Cruz 23'; Muñoz 33', 69'; Sagastume 75' (pen.)

CAR José Rafael Ferrari – court 3, Tegucigalpa
Referee: James Salinas (Honduras)

== Knockout stage ==
All match times are in HNT (UTC−6), as listed by UNCAF.

=== Seventh place match ===
25 January 2024
10:30

Cuba	2–2	El Salvador
Rodríguez 50'; Casanova 90'	Report	Díaz 20'; Delgado 21'
Penalties
Rodríguez (penalty scored); Camejo (penalty missed); Mena (penalty scored); Torres (penalty missed); Campos (penalty scored)	3–4	(penalty scored) Casamalhuapa; (penalty scored) Arias; (penalty missed) Rodríguez; (penalty scored) Reyes; (penalty scored) Díaz

CAR José Rafael Ferrari – court 3, Tegucigalpa
Referee: Jesús Montero (Costa Rica)

=== Fifth place match ===
25 January 2024
14:50

Nicaragua	3–1	Belize
Uriarte 21'; Castillo 45+4'; Cayasso 76'	Report	Martinez 29'

CAR José Rafael Ferrari – court 3, Tegucigalpa
Referee: Modesto Hierrezuelo (Cuba)

=== Third place match ===
25 January 2024
10:40

Costa Rica	2–3	Honduras
Montero 55'; Castro 72'	Report	Paguada 35', 56'; Osorto 63'

CAR José Rafael Ferrari – court 2, Tegucigalpa
Referee: Diego Ojer (Guatemala)

=== Final ===
25 January 2024
15:00

Panama	0–0	Guatemala
	Report
Penalties
Ryce (penalty missed); Rodríguez (penalty missed); Hernández (penalty missed)	0–3	(penalty scored) Ávila; (penalty scored) Muñoz; (penalty scored) Racancoj

CAR José Rafael Ferrari – court 1, Tegucigalpa
Referee: César Nolasco (El Salvador)

== Goalscorers ==
There were 64 goals scored in 16 matches, for an average of 4 goals per match.

6 goals

- (Costa Rica) Claudio Montero

4 goals

- (Honduras) Didier Paguada

3 goals

- (Guatemala) Saúl Sagastume
- (Guatemala) Gabino Vásquez

2 goals

- (Belize) Felix Martinez
- (Costa Rica) Dylan Ramírez
- (Cuba) Samuel Rodríguez
- (El Salvador) Néstor Delgado
- (Guatemala) Marvin Ávila Jr
- (Guatemala) Rudy Muñoz
- (Honduras) Roberto Osorto
- (Nicaragua) Francis Castillo
- (Nicaragua) Kenler Cayasso
- (Panama) Moisés Garibaldo
- (Panama) Carlos Hernández
- (Panama) Jafet Obando

1 goal

- (Belize) Jean Jacques Serano
- (Belize) Isaac Taegar
- (Costa Rica) Gelson Castro
- (Costa Rica) Alberth Barahona
- (Costa Rica) Keylor Jiménez
- (Cuba) Elvis Casanova
- (Cuba) David de Jesús Pérez
- (Cuba) Enmanuel Torres
- (El Salvador) Christopher Argueta
- (El Salvador) Nelson Díaz
- (Guatemala) Axel de la Cruz
- (Guatemala) William Zahran
- (Honduras) Junior Mejía
- (Honduras) Stedman Pérez
- (Honduras) Justin Ponce
- (Honduras) Anfronit Tatum
- (Honduras) Melquizedec Zepeda
- (Nicaragua) Oliver Bello
- (Nicaragua) Izamuel Martínez
- (Nicaragua) Freddy Ortíz
- (Nicaragua) Juban Uriarte
- (Panama) Rafael Mosquera
- (Panama) Julio Rodríguez

1 own goal

- (Belize) Elijah Pelayo (against Costa Rica)

== Final ranking ==
Per statistical convention in football, matches decided in extra time were counted as wins and losses, while matches decided by penalty shoot-out were counted as draws.

Pos	Team	Pld	W	D	L	GF	GA	GD	Pts
1	Guatemala (C)	4	3	1	0	12	3	+9	10
2	Panama	4	3	1	0	8	0	+8	10
3	Honduras (H)	4	3	0	1	11	5	+6	9
4	Costa Rica	4	1	1	2	12	9	+3	4
5	Nicaragua	4	2	0	2	8	9	−1	6
6	Belize	4	1	0	3	4	17	−13	3
7	El Salvador	4	0	1	3	4	14	−10	1
8	Cuba (G)	4	0	2	2	5	7	−2	2

Source: UNCAF
(C) Champions; (G) Guests; (H) Hosts
