= Barbados Division Two =

- Country: Barbados
- Confederation: CONCACAF
- Number of clubs: 21 (in 3 zones)
- Level on pyramid: 3
- Promotion to: Barbados Division One
- Relegation to: Barbados Division Three
- Domestic cup: Barbados FA Cup

The Barbados Division Two is the third-tier league of football in Barbados. It is organized by the Barbados Football Association.

== List of Champions ==
Season	Zone 1	Zone 2	Zone 3	Zone 4	Play-off Champion	Ref.
2013	Crompton FC	Porey Springs FC	Rendezvous FC	Brittons Hill FC	Rendezvous FC	
2014	Sunrise Ballers FC	Eden Stars FC	L&R United FC	N/A	Belfield SC	
2015	St. Andrew Lions FC	St. John Sonnets FC	Barbados Youth Service FC	N/A	St. Andrew Lions FC	
2016	Barbados Defence Force FC	Road View United FC	Wotton FC	N/A	Wotton FC	
2017	Deacons FC	Potential Ballers FC	Haynesville FC	N/A	Deacons FC	
2018	Whitehall Titans FC	Central League Spartans FC	Ivy Rovers FC	N/A		
2019	Fitts Village FC	Kickstart Rush FC	Pinelands FC	N/A		
2020	Not held because of COVID-19 pandemic					
2021	Not held because of COVID-19 pandemic					
2022	Not held because of COVID-19 pandemic					
Season	Winner		Runner-Up		Ref.	
2023						
2024						
2025						
2026	Atlas United		Blackspurs			
