= Jeremy de León =

Puerto Rican footballer (born 2004)

Personal information
- Full name: Jeremy André de León Rodríguez
- Date of birth: 18 March 2004 (age 22)
- Place of birth: Rio Grande, Puerto Rico
- Height: 1.73 m (5 ft 8 in)
- Position: Forward

Team information
- Current team: UE Sant Andreu
- Number: 25

Youth career
- Puerto Rico Surf
- 2020: IDA Valencia
- 2022: Castellón

Senior career*
| Years | Team | Apps | (Gls) |
| 2022–2024 | Castellón | 43 | (2) |
| 2024–2026 | Real Madrid B | 12 | (1) |
| 2025–2026 | → Hércules (loan) | 24 | (0) |
| 2026– | UE Sant Andreu | 7 | (1) |

International career^{‡}
| 2021–2022 | Puerto Rico U20 | 3 | (2) |
| 2024– | Puerto Rico | 10 | (4) |
Medal record
Representing Puerto Rico
Men's football
FIFA Series
| Winner | 2026 Puerto Rico |
- * Club domestic league appearances and goals as of 21 November 2026 ‡ National team caps and goals as of 4 October 2026

Jeremy André de León Rodríguez (born 18 March 2004) is a Puerto Rican professional footballer who plays as a forward for Primera Federación club UE Sant Andreu and the Puerto Rico national team.

== Club career ==
=== Castellón ===
As a youth de León played for local side Hispania FA. At age 9 he was invited to trial with Sevilla. At the age of ten in April 2014, he was invited to Spain to participate in a trial and youth tournament for Málaga and a second training period with Sevilla. While playing for GPS Puerto Rico in the Sheffield Cup in 2019, he was spotted by the International Development Academy based in Valencia and he and his family moved to Spain to join the club in summer 2020.

In winter 2021/22 de León joined the youth team of CD Castellón. After being the team's top scorer with twenty three goals in thirteen matches in the U19 league, the player attracted interest from La Liga clubs Barcelona, Almería, and Sevilla in spring 2022. Shortly thereafter he was linked with moves to Real Madrid, Atlético Madrid, and Real Betis. Despite the interest, de León signed his first professional contract with Castellón in May 2022, a two-year deal which would see him remain at the club until 2024. He made his debut for the club the same month against Villarreal B. The following month Valencia was exploring loan options for the player.

=== Real Madrid Castilla ===
On 24 January 2024, Castellón officially announced the transfer of de León to La Liga club Real Madrid. His debut appearance for Real Madrid Castilla was on 28 January against Linares. On 18 May, de León scored his first goal for Real Madrid's B-team against Intercity.

==== Loan to Hércules ====
On 20 August 2025, de León joined Primera Federación club Hércules on loan for the 2025–26 season.

== International career ==
At the youth level de León represented Puerto Rico in 2022 CONCACAF U-20 Championship qualifying. He scored two goals against Bermuda in the final Group Stage match, an eventual victory which saw Puerto Rico qualify for the final tournament. The same year he was named to Puerto Rico's squad for the 2022 UNCAF U-19 Tournament in Belize. He went on to score two goals in a 3–3 draw with Panama.

De León received his first call-up to the senior national team in summer 2022 for 2022–23 CONCACAF Nations League C matches.

De León made his debut for the senior national team on 6 June 2024 in a World Cup qualifier against El Salvador at the Estadio Cuscatlán. He started the game and played 81 minutes as the match ended in a scoreless draw. In his next game 5 days later against Anguilla, de León scored twice and assisted a goal as Puerto Rico won 8–0.

== Personal life ==
De León is the second cousin of Chilean international footballer Arturo Vidal via his mother.

== Career statistics ==
=== Club ===
As of match played 3 May 2026

Appearances and goals by club, season and competition
| Club | Season | League | | | Cup | | Other | | Total | |
| Club | Season | Division | Apps | Goals | Apps | Goals | Apps | Goals | Apps | Goals |
|---|---|---|---|---|---|---|---|---|---|---|
| Castellón | 2021–22 | Primera División RFEF | 2 | 0 | — | | — | | 2 | 0 |
| Castellón | 2022–23 | Primera Federación | 30 | 2 | — | | — | | 30 | 2 |
| Castellón | 2023–24 | Primera Federación | 11 | 0 | 3 | 0 | — | | 14 | 0 |
| Castellón | Total | | 43 | 2 | 3 | 0 | — | | 46 | 2 |
| Real Madrid Castilla | 2023–24 | Primera Federación | 8 | 1 | — | | — | | 8 | 1 |
| Real Madrid Castilla | 2024–25 | Primera Federación | 4 | 0 | — | | — | | 4 | 0 |
| Real Madrid Castilla | Total | | 12 | 1 | — | | — | | 12 | 1 |
| Hércules (loan) | 2025–26 | Primera Federación | 24 | 0 | — | | — | | 24 | 0 |
| Career total | | | 79 | 3 | 3 | 0 | 0 | 0 | 82 | 3 |

=== International ===
As of match played 26 March 2026.

| National team | Year | Apps | Goals |
|---|---|---|---|
| Puerto Rico | 2024 | 2 | 2 |
| Puerto Rico | 2025 | 2 | 0 |
| Puerto Rico | 2026 | 2 | 1 |
| Total | | 6 | 3 |

List of international goals scored by Jeremy De León
| No. | Date | Venue | Cap | Opponent | Score | Result | Competition | Ref. |
|---|---|---|---|---|---|---|---|---|
| 1 | 11 June 2024 | Juan Ramón Loubriel Stadium, Bayamón, Puerto Rico | 2 | Anguilla | 1–0 | 8–0 | 2026 FIFA World Cup qualification | |
| 2 | 11 June 2024 | Juan Ramón Loubriel Stadium, Bayamón, Puerto Rico | 2 | Anguilla | 4–0 | 8–0 | 2026 FIFA World Cup qualification | |
| 3 | 29 March 2026 | Juan Ramón Loubriel Stadium, Bayamón, Puerto Rico | 5 | U.S. Virgin Islands | 1–0 | 2–0 | 2026 FIFA Series | |
| 4 | 4 October 2026 | Estadio Centroamericano, Mayagüez, Puerto Rico | 10 | Cayman Islands | 1–0 | 0–0 | 2026–27 CONCACAF Nations League B | |

== Honours ==
Puerto Rico

- FIFA Series: 2026

Individual

- FIFA Series Player of the Tournament: 2026
