= Héctor Prillwitz =

Guatemalan footballer (born 2006)

Personal information
- Full name: Héctor Guillermo Prillwitz Castellanos
- Date of birth: 29 March 2006 (age 20)
- Place of birth: San Lucas Sacatepéquez, Guatemala
- Height: 1.75 m (5 ft 9 in)
- Position: Defender

Team information
- Current team: Antigua
- Number: 33

Senior career*
Years	Team	Apps	(Gls)
2023–2024	Guastatoya	19	(3)
2024–	Antigua	3	(0)

International career^{‡}
2023	Guatemala U17	7	(0)
2024	Guatemala U18	4	(1)
2023–	Guatemala U20	10	(1)
Medal record
Men's football
Representing Guatemala
UNCAF U-19 Tournament
Winner	2024 Honduras
- * Club domestic league appearances and goals as of 1 September 2024 ‡ National team caps and goals as of 22 July 2024

Héctor Guillermo Prillwitz Castellanos (born 29 March 2006) is a Guatemalan professional footballer who plays as a defender for Liga Guate club Antigua.

== Club career ==
=== Guastatoya ===
Héctor Prillwitz started his senior career with Liga Nacional club Guastatoya in 2023. He made his debut on 13 August 2023, against Mixco in a 2–1 win. On 28 October 2023, Prillwitz would score his first two goals for Guastatoya in a 4–0 win against Malacateco, at just 17 years old.

== Honours ==
=== Guatemala U20 ===
- UNCAF U-19 Tournament: 2024
