= Azarni Callwood =

British Virgin Islands footballer

Personal information
- Date of birth: 21 September 2006 (age 20)
- Place of birth: British Virgin Islands
- Position: Striker

Team information
- Current team: Rebels
- Number: 9

Senior career*
Years	Team	Apps	(Gls)
2021–2022	One Caribbean		
2023–2024	Rebels		
2024	Lexington SC (UPSL)	3	(0)
2024–	Islanders		

International career^{‡}
2023–	British Virgin Islands	6	(0)
- * Club domestic league appearances and goals as of 14:00, 20 September 2024 (UTC) ‡ National team caps and goals as of 14:00, 20 September 2024 (UTC)

Azarni Callwood (born 21 September 2006) is a British Virgin Islands footballer who currently plays for Islanders FC and the British Virgin Islands national team.

== Youth career ==
Callwood began playing football at age five. He attended the Cedar International School on Tortola. In 2017, he was a member of the school's under-12 team that won its division of the BDO Afterschool League with Callwood as the division's top scorer. That year, he was also selected as a member of a representative team made up of Virgin Gorda League players to competed in a club competition in Sint Maarten. Callwood scored three goals in three matches for the Virgin Gorda Under-13 Future Stars to help the team remain undefeated. In August 2017, Callwood attended a trial with AFC Bournemouth after being spotted at a local skills camp. He participated in training matches during the trial, including against the under-15 side of Southampton.

The following year, he was selected as part of an under-12 representative team called the BVI Rockers that competed in the GPS Caribbean Showcase in Puerto Rico. Later in 2018, he travelled to Spain to compete in the Barcelona Cup, playing with the Champion Sports Group team from England, against players from around the world. He went on to be one of the top scorers in the competition. In 2019, he returned to Puerto Rico to compete in the GPS Caribbean Showcase again. This time, his under-13 team finished second in its division with Callwood scoring two goals against the team from Guaynabo in the final match. Shortly thereafter, he went on trial in England with the opportunity to attend a school and play football in the country. He was offered a scholarship to attend the Bournemouth Collegiate School and a spot in its main football squad. In summer 2019, he traveled as a member of the VG Future Stars to the Dominican Republic for a prospects tournament. Callwood was the tournament's top scorer with seven goals in six matches, including at least one goal in every contest. The British team ultimately finished runners-up in the competition.

== Club career ==
Callwood played for local club One Caribbean FC. For the 2020/2021 season, he was a member of the club's youth squad that competed in the BVIFA National U13 Youth League. The club folded during the 2022/2023 BVIFA National Football League season and Callwood moved to Rebels FC.

In summer 2024, Callwood joined American club Lexington SC and played for its academy side in the UPSL. He made three appearances for the club that season. By the following November, Callwood had returned to BVI and joined Islanders FC.

== International career ==
As a youth, Callwood was a member of the Virgin Islands squad that participated in the 2019 CONCACAF Boys' Under-15 Championship. The team went on become champions of the competition's Division 3 that year. Callwood scored in the campaign, including a goal against Saint Martin to close out the Group Stage. He later competed in 2022 CONCACAF U-17 Championship qualifying. In preparation for the tournament, the British Virgin Islands team played their American counterparts in a pair of friendlies. Callwood scored three goals over the two matches, resulting in one win and one draw. He was then a member of the national under-20 team that competed in 2024 CONCACAF U-20 Championship qualifying. He went on to be the top goalscorer in qualification, scoring six goals in four matches, including a hat-trick against Anguilla to close out the BVI's campaign.

Callwood made his senior international debut on 23 March 2023 in a 2022–23 CONCACAF Nations League C match against Puerto Rico. Prior to the match, senior national team head coach Chris Kiwomya identified Callwood as one of the territory's exciting young prospects that could debut and have an impact in the match. During 2026 FIFA World Cup qualification, he scored the game-winning goal in a penalty shootout against the U.S. Virgin Islands. The win was the British Virgin Islands' first-ever victory in FIFA World Cup qualification and secured the team's advancement to the next round for the first time.

=== International statistics ===
As of match played 10 September 2024

British Virgin Islands
Year	Apps	Goals
2023	3	0
2024	3	0
Total	6	0
