= Cameron Johnson (disambiguation) =

Cameron Johnson (born 1996) is an American basketball player.

Cameron or Cam Johnson may also refer to:

- Cam Johnson (defensive end) (born 1990), American football defensive end
- Cam Johnson (ice hockey) (born 1994), American pro ice hockey goaltender
- Cameron Johnson (actor) (born 1999), American actor
- Cameron Johnson (footballer) (born 2004), Costa Rican international footballer

== See also ==
- Camron Johnson (born 1999), American football wide receiver
- Kameron Johnson (born 2002), American football wide receiver
- Cameron Johnston (disambiguation)
