= Félix Martínez =

Félix Martínez may refer to:

- Félix Martínez (athlete) (born 1985), Puerto Rican sprinter
- Félix Martínez de Torrelaguna, acting Governor of New Mexico from 1715 to 1716
- Félix Martínez (baseball) (born 1974), former Major League Baseball shortstop for the Kansas City Royals and Tampa Bay Devil Rays
- Tippy Martinez (Felix Anthony Martinez, born 1950), professional baseball pitcher
- Félix Lázaro Martínez (born 1936), bishop for the Roman Catholic Diocese of Ponce
- Félix Millán (Félix Bernardo Millán Martínez, born 1943), former second baseman in Major League Baseball
- Félix Martínez (footballer) (born 2005), Belizean football forward
