= Cosmos FC (Barbados) =

Barbados football club

- Full name: Cosmos Football Club
- Founded: 1990
- Ground: White Hall Playing Field
- Capacity: 1,000
- Manager: Steve Cumberbatch
- League: Barbados Division Two
- 2019: 1st, Zone 2 (Promoted)

Cosmos FC is a Barbadian football club based in Speightstown, the second largest city in the country. As of 2019 it competes in the Barbados Division Two, the nation's third-tier league.

== History ==
The club was re-established in 1990 by Basil Harewood. It has gone on to place well in national competitions and produce players for the Barbados youth and senior national teams. In 2013 the club was promoted to the Barbados Premier League before being relegated the following season. In 2018 the club competed in the Barbados Division Two. The following season Cosmos FC competed in the inaugural Capelli Super Cup. During the 2019 season, the club was promoted back to Division Two.

== Domestic history ==
Key

Champion Runners-up 3rd Place

Season	League							Notes
Season	Div.	Pos.	Pl.	W	D	L	Pts.	Notes
2010	IV	7th, Concrete Zone	22	7	5	10	26	
2013	I	11th	22	5	2	17	17	
2014	I	9th	18	2	5	11	11	Relegated to Barbados Division One
2015	II	9th	18	2	5	11	11	Relegated to Barbados Division Two
2016	III	8th, Edwin Harding Zone	18	4	2	12	14	
2017	III	7th, Edwin Harding Zone	18	7	1	10	2	
2018	III	8th, Edwin Harding Zone	14	0	4	10	4	Relegated to Barbados Division Three
2019	IV	1st, Zone 2	12	10	1	1	31	promoted to Barbados Division Two
2020	III	Cancelled because of COVID-19 pandemic						
2021	III	Cancelled because of COVID-19 pandemic						
2022	III	Cancelled because of COVID-19 pandemic						
