= Khalil Vanderpool-Nurse =

Barbadian footballer

Personal information
- Date of birth: 14 March 2005 (age 21)
- Place of birth: Bridgetown, Barbados
- Height: 1.89 m (6 ft 2 in)
- Positions: Midfielder; forward

Team information
- Current team: Coastal Spirit
- Number: 9

Youth career
- 2011–2021: Kickstart Rush
- 2021–2023: Rossall School

Senior career*
Years	Team	Apps	(Gls)
2023–2024	Dubai City	0	(0)
2024–2025	Härnösand	8	(12)
2025–2026	Ytterhogdals	2	(3)
2026	Wotton FC		
2026–	Coastal Spirit	11	(5)

International career^{‡}
2024–	Barbados	3	(0)
- * Club domestic league appearances and goals as of 19:50, 20 November 2026 (UTC) ‡ National team caps and goals as of 23:55, 10 September 2024 (UTC)

Khalil Vanderpool-Nurse (born 14 March 2005) is a Barbadian footballer who plays as a midfielder for Southern League club Coastal Spirit, and the Barbados national team.

== Club career ==
Vanderpool-Nurse began playing football at age six. He first joined Kickstart Rush FC where he remained for ten years. In 2016, he scored seventeen goals to become the MVP of the BICO Primary School Football Tournament, earning the man of the match award for the championship final victory. In 2018, he scored twenty-one goals to help Kickstart FC win the national under-13 division. In 2021, Vanderpool-Nurse decided to move abroad to continue his football career, applying to the Rossall School and Brook House College in the United Kingdom. After being accepted into both, he ultimately chose the Rossall School because of its partnership with Fleetwood Town.

After attending the Rossall School from 2021 to 2023, Vanderpool-Nurse signed for Dubai City F.C. of the UAE First Division League for the 2023–24 season. In summer 2024, he moved to Swedish Division 4 club Härnösand. On 6 August 2024, he scored four goals in a 6–0 league victory over Forsmo IF. In August 2025, it was announced that Vanderpool-Nurse had been transferred to Ytterhogdals IK of the Swedish Division 2 for the remainder of the season.

Following his departure from Ytterhogdals, Vanderpool-Nurse returned to Barbados with a stint at Wotton FC. Early in the season, he scored in a 2–3 defeat to Britton's Hill United.

== International career ==
Vanderpool-Nurse was eligible to represent the United States and Barbados as citizens of both nations. At the youth level, he represented Barbados at the 2018 Caribbean Football Union U14 Boys Championships in Jamaica. He scored on his debut in the team's match against the British Virgin Islands. In 2024, he was part of the Barbados squad that competed in 2024 CONCACAF U-20 Championship qualifying. In the competition, he scored two goals in ten minutes to defeat Saint Martin for Barbados's first win of the competition.

Vanderpool-Nurse received his first senior international call up in June 2024 for 2026 FIFA World Cup qualification matches against Curaçao and Haiti. He made his senior international debut on 9 June 2024, coming on as a substitute in the match against Haiti.

=== International career statistics ===
As of match played 10 September 2024.

Barbados national team
Year	Apps	Goals
2024	3	0
Total	3	0
