= Panama national under-20 football team =

Panama U-20
- Nickname(s): La Marea Roja (The Red Tide); Los Canaleros (The Canal Men)
- Association: Federación Panameña de Fútbol
- Confederation: CONCACAF (North America)
- Sub-confederation: UNCAF (Central America)
- Head coach: Jorge Dely Valdés
- Home stadium: Estadio Rommel Fernández
- FIFA code: PAN
First colours	Second colours

First international
- Brazil 7–1 Panama (Caracas, Venezuela; 23 March 1954)

Biggest win
- Belize 0–6 Panama (Panama City, Panama; 4 December 2000); Panama 6–0 Nicaragua (Panama City, Panama; 8 July 2016)

Biggest defeat
- Paraguay 9–1 Panama (Caracas, Venezuela; 26 March 1954)

FIFA U-20 World Cup
- Appearances: 7 (first in 2003)
- Best result: Round of 16 (2019)

CONCACAF Under-20 Championship
- Appearances: 12 (first in 1962)
- Best result: Runners-up (2015)

UNCAF U-19 Tournament
- Appearances: 3 (first in 2018)
- Best result: Runners-up (2018, 2024)
Medal record
Men's football
CONCACAF U-20 Championship
Silver medal – second place	2015	Team
Bronze medal – third place	2022	Team
Bronze medal – third place	2024	Team

The Panama national under-20 football team (Spanish: Selección nacional sub-20 de Panamá) represents Panama in international youth competitions, it is also managed as the under-19 team for the regional UNCAF under-19 tournaments. The team has made seven FIFA U-20 World Cup appearances, with the most recent being the 2025 FIFA U-20 World Cup hosted in Chile. Their best result so far was reaching the round of 16 in the 2019 FIFA U-20 World Cup, hosted in Poland.

== Competitive Record ==
Champions Runners-up Third place Tournament played on home soil

=== FIFA U-20 World Cup ===
FIFA U-20 World Cup record
Year	Round	GP	W	D	L	GF	GA
(Tunisia) 1977	Did not qualify						
(Japan) 1979	Did not qualify						
(Australia) 1981	Did not qualify						
(Mexico) 1983	Did not qualify						
(Soviet Union) 1985	Did not qualify						
(Chile) 1987	Did not qualify						
(Saudi Arabia) 1989	Did not qualify						
(Portugal) 1991	Did not qualify						
(Australia) 1993	Did not qualify						
(Qatar) 1995	Did not qualify						
(Malaysia) 1997	Did not qualify						
(Nigeria) 1999	Did not qualify						
(Argentina) 2001	Did not qualify						
(United Arab Emirates) 2003	Group stage	3	0	0	3	1	4
(Netherlands) 2005	Group stage	3	0	0	3	2	8
(Canada) 2007	Group stage	3	0	1	2	1	8
(Egypt) 2009	Did not qualify						
(Colombia) 2011	Group stage	3	0	1	2	0	5
(Turkey) 2013	Did not qualify						
(New Zealand) 2015	Group stage	3	0	1	2	3	5
(South Korea) 2017	Did not qualify						
(Poland) 2019	Round of 16	4	1	1	2	4	8
(Argentina) 2023	Did not qualify						
(Chile) 2025	Group stage	3	0	1	2	4	6
(Azerbaijan) (Uzbekistan) 2027	Did not qualify						
(Armenia) (Georgia (country)) 2029	To be determined						
Total	Round of 16	22	1	5	16	15	44

== Current squad ==
A preliminary 24-player squad was announced on 1 September 2025. The final 21-player squad was announced on 22 September 2025.

No.	Pos.	Player	Date of birth (age)	Club
1	GK	Ian Flores	20 March 2005 (aged 20)	(Panamanian Football Federation) San Francisco
2	DF	Javier Arboleda	17 April 2006 (aged 19)	(Panamanian Football Federation) Independiente
3	DF	Julio Rodríguez	9 March 2005 (aged 20)	(Panamanian Football Federation) Plaza Amador
4	DF	Erick Díaz	4 March 2006 (aged 19)	(United States Soccer Federation) Los Angeles FC
5	DF	Ariel Arroyo	23 January 2005 (aged 20)	(Panamanian Football Federation) Árabe Unido
6	MF	Luis Villarreal	25 August 2005 (aged 20)	(Panamanian Football Federation) Veraguas
7	MF	Kairo Walters	30 April 2005 (aged 20)	(United States Soccer Federation) Los Angeles FC
8	MF	Anel Ryce	6 July 2006 (aged 19)	(Ukrainian Association of Football) Chornomorets Odesa
9	FW	Gustavo Herrera	18 November 2005 (aged 19)	(Costa Rican Football Federation) Saprissa
10	MF	Giovany Herbert	12 March 2005 (aged 20)	(Brazilian Football Confederation) Athletico Paranaense
11	MF	Ryan Gómez	4 January 2006 (aged 19)	(Brazilian Football Confederation) Grêmio
12	GK	Cecilio Burgess	21 October 2005 (aged 19)	(Panamanian Football Federation) UMECIT
13	DF	Martín Krug	9 July 2006 (aged 19)	(Royal Spanish Football Federation) Levante
14	DF	Juan Hall	9 March 2006 (aged 19)	(Panamanian Football Federation) Herrera
15	MF	Joseph Jones	30 July 2005 (aged 20)	(Panamanian Football Federation) Plaza Amador
16	FW	Kevin Walder	13 April 2006 (aged 19)	(Panamanian Football Federation) Plaza Amador
17	MF	Ernesto Gómez	13 August 2007 (aged 18)	(Panamanian Football Federation) Universitario
18	FW	Karlo Kurányi	27 September 2005 (aged 20)	(German Football Association) SGV Freiberg
19	MF	Rafael Mosquera	25 May 2005 (aged 20)	(United States Soccer Federation) New York Red Bulls
20	DF	Antony Herbert	12 March 2005 (aged 20)	(Royal Spanish Football Federation) Conquense
21	GK	Sean Deane	14 April 2005 (aged 20)	(Panamanian Football Federation) Plaza Amador

== Recent call-ups ==
Pos.	Player	Date of birth (age)	Caps	Goals	Club	Latest call-up
GK	Emerson Dimas	10 August 2001 (age 25)	3	0	(Panama) Herrera	2022 Maurice Revello Tournament, June 2022
GK	Saúl Espinosa	18 April 2002 (age 24)	0	0	(Panama) Plaza Amador	2022 Maurice Revello Tournament, June 2022
GK	Jorginho Frías	21 March 2001 (age 25)	0	0	(Panama) Sporting San Miguelito	2022 Maurice Revello Tournament, June 2022
DF	Eduardo Anderson	1 March 2001 (age 25)	0	0	(Panama) Alianza	2022 Maurice Revello Tournament, June 2022
DF	Luis Asprilla	28 May 2001 (age 25)	0	0	(Panama) Tauro	2022 Maurice Revello Tournament, June 2022
DF	Kevin Berkeley	Unknown	0	0	(Brazil) Coritiba	2022 Maurice Revello Tournament, June 2022
DF	José Córdoba	3 June 2001 (age 25)	0	0	(Bulgaria) Levski Sofia	2022 Maurice Revello Tournament, June 2022
DF	Edgardo Fariña	Unknown	0	0	(Panama) Independiente	2022 Maurice Revello Tournament, June 2022
DF	José Matos	8 March 2002 (age 24)	0	0	(Panama) CD Universitario	2022 Maurice Revello Tournament, June 2022
DF	Reyniel Perdomo	28 April 2001 (age 25)	0	0	(Panama) Alianza	2022 Maurice Revello Tournament, June 2022
MF	Davis Contreras	9 December 2001 (age 24)	0	0	(Panama) Independiente	2022 Maurice Revello Tournament, June 2022
MF	Jamel González	28 February 2001 (age 25)	0	0	(Panama) CD Universitario	2022 Maurice Revello Tournament, June 2022
MF	Abdul Knight	17 January 2002 (age 24)	0	0	(Panama) Plaza Amador	2022 Maurice Revello Tournament, June 2022
MF	Uziel Maltez	20 March 2002 (age 24)	0	0	(Panama) Independiente	2022 Maurice Revello Tournament, June 2022
MF	Víctor Medina	18 February 2001 (age 25)	0	0	(Costa Rica) Deportivo Saprissa	2022 Maurice Revello Tournament, June 2022
MF	Martín Morán	30 August 2001 (age 25)	0	0	(Bulgaria) Etar Veliko Tarnovo	2022 Maurice Revello Tournament, June 2022
MF	Yoameth Murillo	7 November 2001 (age 25)	0	0	(Panama) Club del Este	2022 Maurice Revello Tournament, June 2022
FW	Azarias Londoño	21 June 2001 (age 25)	0	0	(Panama) Alianza	2022 Maurice Revello Tournament, June 2022
FW	Jorge Méndez	6 April 2001 (age 25)	9	0	(Panama) Plaza Amador	2022 Maurice Revello Tournament, June 2022
FW	Ángel Orelien	2 April 2001 (age 25)	8	3	(Panama) Plaza Amador	2022 Maurice Revello Tournament, June 2022
FW	Ricardo Phillips	6 May 2001 (age 25)	0	0	(Ecuador) 9 de Octubre	2022 Maurice Revello Tournament, June 2022
FW	Carlos Rodríguez	17 May 2001 (age 25)	0	0	(Panama) Club del Este	2022 Maurice Revello Tournament, June 2022

== Head-to-head record ==
The following table shows Panama's head-to-head record in the FIFA U-20 World Cup.

Opponent	GP	W	D	L	GF	GA	GD	Win %
Argentina	2	0	1	1	2	8	−6	0.00
Austria	2	0	1	1	1	2	−1	0.00
Brazil	1	0	0	1	0	4	−4	0.00
Burkina Faso	1	0	0	1	0	1	−1	0.00
China	1	0	0	1	1	4	−3	0.00
Czech Republic	1	0	0	1	1	2	−1	0.00
Egypt	1	0	0	1	0	1	−1	0.00
France	1	0	0	1	0	2	−2	0.00
Ghana	1	0	0	1	0	1	−1	0.00
Mali	1	0	1	0	1	1	+0	0.00
North Korea	1	0	1	0	0	0	+0	0.00
Paraguay	1	0	0	1	2	3	−1	0.00
Saudi Arabia	1	1	0	0	2	1	+1	100.00
Slovakia	1	0	0	1	0	1	−1	0.00
South Korea	1	0	0	1	1	2	−1	0.00
Turkey	1	0	0	1	0	1	−1	0.00
Ukraine	3	0	1	2	3	8	−5	0.00
United Arab Emirates	1	0	0	1	1	2	−1	0.00
Total	22	1	5	16	15	44	−29	4.55

== Historical list of coaches ==
- 2002–2004 Gary Stempel (Panama) (England)
- 2004–2005 Victor René Mendieta (Panama)
- 2006–2007 Julio Dely Valdés (Panama)
- 2008–2009 Cristóbal Maldonado (Paraguay)
- 2010–2011 Jorge Dely Valdés (Panama)
- 2011–2013 José Alfredo Poyatos (Panama)
- 2013 (interim) Juan Carlos Cubillas (Panama)
- 2013–2014 Javier Wanchope (Costa Rica)
- 2014–2017 Leonardo Pipino (Argentina) (Italy)
- 2017–2018 Nelson Gallego (Colombia)
- 2018–2019 Jorge Dely Valdés (Panama)
- 2019–2020 Julio Dely Valdes (Panama)
- 2020–2021 Saúl Maldonado (Uruguay) (Venezuela)
- 2021–2022 Ángel Sánchez Mazana (Venezuela) (Spain)
- 2022–2026 Jorge Dely Valdés (Panama)
- 2026–present Mike Stump (Panama) (United States)

== See also ==
- Panama national football team
- Panama national under-23 football team
- Panama national under-17 football team
