= Cameron Johnston (disambiguation) =

Cameron Johnston (born 1992) is an Australian-born American football player.

Cameron Johnston may also refer to:

- Cameron Johnston (wrestler) (born 1970), Australian wrestler
- Cameron Johnston (writer), Scottish science fiction writer

== See also ==
- Cameron Johnson (disambiguation)
