= Félix Martínez (footballer) =

Belizean footballer (born 2005)

Personal information
- Full name: Félix Micah Martínez
- Date of birth: 9 July 2005 (age 21)
- Place of birth: Dangriga, Belize
- Position: Forward

Team information
- Current team: Verdes
- Number: 13

Youth career
- –2023: Wagiya

Senior career*
| Years | Team | Apps | (Gls) |
| 2023–2024 | Wagiya | | |
| 2024– | Verdes | | |

International career^{‡}
| 2024– | Belize U20 | 8 | (6) |
| 2024– | Belize | 1 | (1) |
- * Club domestic league appearances and goals ‡ National team caps and goals as of 18:43, 25 March 2024 (UTC)

Félix Martínez (born 9 July 2005) is a Belizean association footballer who currently plays for Premier League of Belize club Verdes FC and the Belize national team.

== Club career ==
As a youth, Martínez played for Wagierale FC and was a regular scorer for the club. He played for Wagiya SC of the Premier League of Belize through the end of the opening round of the 2023–24 season. He had scored three goals in the first ten matches of the campaign.

In January 2024, prior to the start of the second half of the season, Martínez moved to league rivals Verdes FC. Soon thereafter, he scored the game-winning goal in a victory over Benque Viejo United FC in the Western Championship, a knock-out tournament to determine the top club in the Cayo District. It was Martínez's first goal for the club. Verdes FC went on to win the tournament. In the opening match of the second half of the season, and Martínez's first league match with Verdes, he scored in a 3–0 victory over Belmopan Bandits.

== International career ==
In January 2024, Martínez represented Belize at the youth level in the 2024 UNCAF U-19 Tournament. He scored in a 2–1 victory over Cuba to close out the group stage. He scored again in the fifth-place match against Nicaragua with Belize ultimately finishing sixth with the 1–3 defeat. Later that year, he was called up for 2024 CONCACAF U-20 Championship qualifying. He scored one goal against the British Virgin Islands and a hat-trick against Anguilla during the ultimately unsuccessful qualifying campaign.

Martínez received his first senior international call-up in March 2024 for a pair of friendlies against Puerto Rico at home. He made his senior international debut on 24 March 2024, in the second fixture. After entering the match as a substitute, he scored his first senior international goal in the eventual 3–0 victory.

=== International goals ===
Scores and results list Belize's goal tally first.

| No. | Date | Venue | Opponent | Score | Result | Competition |
|---|---|---|---|---|---|---|
| 1 | 24 March 2024 | FFB Stadium, Belmopan, Belize | Puerto Rico | 3–0 | 3–0 | Friendly |
Last updated 25 March 2024

=== International career statistics ===
As of match played 24 March 2024.

Belize national team
| 2024 | 1 | 1 |
| Total | 1 | 1 |
