= Sachiel Ming =

Bermudian footballer

Personal information
- Date of birth: 8 August 2005 (age 21)
- Place of birth: Southampton, Bermuda
- Height: 1.70 m (5 ft 7 in)
- Positions: Forward; midfielder

Youth career
- –2018: PHC Zebras
- 2018–2024: Robin Hood

College career
Years	Team	Apps	(Gls)
2024–	Syracuse Orange	37	(2)

Senior career*
Years	Team	Apps	(Gls)
2024–	Black Rock	13	(2)

International career^{‡}
2024–	Bermuda	8	(1)
- * Club domestic league appearances and goals as of 16:02, 20 January 2026 (UTC) ‡ National team caps and goals as of 16:02, 20 January 2026 (UTC)

Sachiel Ming (born 8 August 2005) is a Bermudian footballer who plays for Black Rock FC and the Bermuda national team.

== Club career ==
Domestically, Ming played for the academies of PHC Zebras and Robin Hood as a youth before attending the Northwood School in Lake Placid, New York. While playing for Northwood's school team, Ming also played for Black Rock FC of the USL League Two beginning in summer 2024 and returned for the 2025 season.

Early in his senior year, he committed to playing college soccer for the Syracus Orange of the NCAA Division I. The Orange coaching staff had been monitoring Ming's progress since he was a 16-year-old sophomore at Northwood. His standout performances, including leading the team to the final of the inaugural Prep Premier League Championship, prompted the university to offer the scholarship.

== International career ==
At the youth level, Ming represented Bermuda internationally in 2024 CONCACAF U-20 Championship qualifying. He scored in the team's opening match, a 2–1 victory over Grenada.

Ming received his first senior international call-up in March 2024 for 2024 FIFA Series matches in Saudi Arabia. He went on to make his senior debut in the competition, coming on as a second-half substitute against Brunei on 22 March 2024. He scored his first senior international goal on 5 June 2024 in a 2026 FIFA World Cup qualification match against Antigua and Barbuda. After coming on as a late-substite, Ming scored to secure the eventual 1–1 draw.

=== International goals ===
No	Date	Venue	Opponent	Score	Result	Competition
1.	5 June 2024	ABFA Technical Centre, Piggotts, Antigua and Barbuda	Antigua and Barbuda	1–1	1–1	2026 FIFA World Cup qualification
Last updated 20 January 2026

=== International career statistics ===
As of match played 10 June 2025

Bermuda
Year	Apps	Goals
2024	4	1
2025	4	0
Total	8	1

== Club statistics ==
Appearances and goals by club, season and competition
Season	Division	Club	League		Cup		Total	
Season	Division	Club	Apps	Goals	Apps	Goals	Apps	Goals
2024	USL League Two	Black Rock	7	2	0	0	7	2
2025	USL League Two	Black Rock	6	0	0	0	6	0
Career total			13	2	0	0	13	2
