= Doryan Rodríguez =

Costa Rican association football player

Personal information
- Full name: Doryan Jovanny Rodríguez Soto
- Date of birth: 18 January 2003 (age 23)
- Place of birth: San Mateo de Alajuela
- Position: Forward

Team information
- Current team: Puntarenas
- Number: 21

Youth career
- –2021: Liga Deportiva Alajuelense

Senior career*
Years	Team	Apps	(Gls)
2021–2026	Alajuelense	75	(14)
2024	→ Puntarenas (loan)	15	(4)
2025	→ Sporting F.C. (loan)	30	(5)
2026	→ Puntarenas (loan)	15	(5)
2026	Puntarenas	24	(7)

International career^{‡}
2021–2022	Costa Rica U20	18	(6)
2022	Costa Rica U22	5	(2)
2023	Costa Rica U23	9	(3)
2026–	Costa Rica	2	(0)
- * Club domestic league appearances and goals as of 23:13 (UTC) 19 September 2026 ‡ National team caps and goals as of 21:35 (UTC) 27 September 2026

Doryan Jovanny Rodríguez Soto (born 18 January 2003) is a Costa Rican professional footballer who plays as a striker in Liga FPD for Puntarenas and the Costa Rica national team.

== Club career ==
=== LD Alajuelense ===
Born in 2023, and originally from the canton of San Mateo de Alajuela, he came through the academy at LD Alajuelense, twice winning the national under-20 league title, and topping the goalscoring lists at that level.

He made a goal-scoring league debut for LD Alajuelense on 7 September 2021, against A.D.R. Jicaral, coming on as a second-half substitute in a 2-0 win.

He played for Alajuelense in the 2022 Liga FPD grand final against C.S. Cartaginés, although his side lost the tie on aggregate. In 2022, he made his debut in the CONCACAF League against CD Águilas. On November 16, he made a goal scoring debut in the Costa Rican Cup Tournament against AD Guanacasteca, scoring twice in a 2-1 victory.

On November 18, 2023, he appeared in the final of the 2023 Costa Rican Cup against Deportivo Saprissa, with his side winning 2-0. In December 2023, he was named young player of the tournament as Alajuelense won the 2023 CONCACAF Central American Cup.

=== Puntarenas FC (loan) ===
On January 6, 2024, Rodríguez signed with Puntarenas FC on a six-month loan.

== International career ==
He played as Costa Rica won the 2022 UNCAF U-19 Tournament in Belize. He represented Costa Rica at the 2022 CONCACAF U-20 Championship in Honduras, scoring against Jamaica U20 on 19 June 2022. In June 2023, he was called up to the Costa Rica under-23 team for the 2023 Central American and Caribbean Games in El Salvador.

== Career statistics ==
=== International ===
As of match played 27 September 2026

Appearances and goals by national team and year
National team	Year	Apps	Goals
Costa Rica	2026	3	0
Total		3	0
