= Edward Cedeño =

Panamanian football player (born 2003)

Personal information
- Full name: Edward Edier Cedeño Guerrel
- Date of birth: 5 July 2003 (age 23)
- Place of birth: Panama City, Panama
- Height: 1.88 m (6 ft 2 in)
- Position: Midfielder

Team information
- Current team: Las Palmas

Youth career
- 2018–2021: Potros del Este

Senior career*
| Years | Team | Apps | (Gls) |
| 2021–2025 | Potros del Este | 16 | (1) |
| 2023–2024 | → Alajuelense (loan) | 21 | (0) |
| 2024–2025 | → Tarazona (loan) | 28 | (1) |
| 2025– | Las Palmas | 7 | (0) |
| 2026 | → Albacete (loan) | 0 | (0) |

International career^{‡}
| 2022 | Panama U19 | 4 | (1) |
| 2022 | Panama U20 | 5 | (0) |
| 2023 | Panama U23 | 6 | (0) |
| 2025– | Panama | 5 | (0) |
- * Club domestic league appearances and goals as of 14 December 2025 ‡ National team caps and goals as of 22:50, 13 November 2025 (UTC)

Edward Edier Cedeño Guerrel (born 5 July 2003) is a Panamanian footballer who plays as midfielder for Spanish club UD Las Palmas and the Panama national team.

== Club career ==
A youth product of Potros del Este, Cedeño began his senior career with the club in the Liga FPD in 2021. On 18 October 2023, he joined the Costa Rican club Alajuelense on loan for the 2023–24 season. He helped Alajuelense win the 2023 CONCACAF Central American Cup and 2023 Costa Rican Cup.

On 21 August 2024, Cedeño joined Spanish Primera Federación club SD Tarazona on a season-long loan with an option to buy. On 10 July 2025, he signed a three-year contract with Segunda División side UD Las Palmas.

On 14 January 2026, after being rarely used, he was loaned to fellow second division side Albacete Balompié until June, but was unable to play for the side after suffering a serious injury.

== International career ==
Herrera was part of the Panama U20s at the 2022 CONCACAF U-20 Championship. In 2023 he was part of the Panam U23s that won the 2023 Maurice Revello Tournament. He was called up to the senior Panama national team for the 2025 CONCACAF Nations League Finals.

== Career statistics ==
=== Club ===
As of match played 9 November 2025

Appearances and goals by club, season and competition
| Club | Season | League | | | National cup (Note: Includes Copa Panamá, Costa Rican Cup, Copa del Rey) | | Continental | | Other | | Total | |
| Club | Season | Division | Apps | Goals | Apps | Goals | Apps | Goals | Apps | Goals | Apps | Goals |
|---|---|---|---|---|---|---|---|---|---|---|---|---|
| Potros del Este | 2021 | Liga Panameña de Fútbol | 5 | 1 | 0 | 0 | — | | — | | 5 | 1 |
| Potros del Este | 2022 | Liga Panameña de Fútbol | 11 | 0 | 0 | 0 | — | | — | | 11 | 0 |
| Potros del Este | Total | | 16 | 1 | 0 | 0 | — | | — | | 16 | 1 |
| Alajuelense (loan) | 2022–23 | Liga FPD | 0 | 0 | 2 | 0 | — | | — | | 2 | 0 |
| Alajuelense (loan) | 2023–24 | Liga FPD | 21 | 0 | 2 | 0 | 5 (Note: One appearance in CONCACAF Champions Cup, four appearances in CONCACAF Central American Cup) | 0 | — | | 28 | 0 |
| Alajuelense (loan) | Total | | 21 | 0 | 4 | 0 | 5 | 0 | — | | 30 | 0 |
| Tarazona (loan) | 2024–25 | Primera Federación | 28 | 1 | — | | — | | — | | 28 | 1 |
| Las Palmas | 2025–26 | Segunda División | 6 | 0 | 0 | 0 | — | | 0 | 0 | 6 | 0 |
| Career total | | | 71 | 2 | 4 | 0 | 5 | 0 | 0 | 0 | 80 | 2 |

=== International ===
As of match played 13 November 2025

Appearances and goals by national team and year
| National team | Year | Apps | Goals |
|---|---|---|---|
| Panama | 2025 | 5 | 0 |
| Total | | 5 | 0 |

== Honours ==
Alajuelense

- CONCACAF Central American Cup: 2023
- Costa Rican Cup: 2023

Panama U23

- Maurice Revello Tournament: 2023
