= Kickstart Rush FC =

- Founded: 1999; 27 years ago
- Ground: Wildey Turf
- Capacity: 2,000
- Manager: Renaldo Gilkes
- League: Barbados Premier League
- 2026: 2nd
- Website: Website

Kickstart Rush FC is a Barbadian football club based in Bridgetown that currently competes in the Barbados Premier League, the top tier of football in Barbados.

== History ==
Founded as a non-profit, Kickstart FC was established in 1999. The club became an affiliate of Rush Soccer in 2020 and became Kickstart Rush FC. The club was promoted to the Barbados Premier League for the first time for the 2024 season. In its first-ever Premier League match, Kickstart Rush defeated Ellerton FC 2–0 for its first-ever top-flight victory. The club finished in third place in the league standings in its inaugural campaign.

Kickstart Rush went on to finish as runners-up in the Prime Minister’s Cup in November 2025. On 17 May 2026, the club defeated a shorthanded St. Andrew Lions FC by a score of 23–0. Barbados U17 international Jamarco Johnson scored eight of Kickstart's goals in the match. The result became the largest-ever margin of victory in league history. The club went on to finish as Premier League runners-up to Weymouth Wales that season.

== Recent seasons ==
Key

Champion Runners-up 3rd place

Season	League							Notes
Season	Div.	Pos.	Pl.	W	D	L	P	Notes
2023	II	2nd	23	16	4	3	51	promoted to Barbados Premier League
2024	I	3rd	18	10	4	4	34	
2025	I	6th	18	6	4	9	21	
2026	I	2nd	18	10	6	2	36	

== Notable players ==
This list of former players includes those who received international caps, made significant contributions to the team in terms of appearances or goals, or who made significant contributions to the sport. It is not complete or all inclusive, and additions and refinements will continue to be made over time.

- (Barbados) Nicoli Brathwaite
- (Barbados) Ricardio Morris
- (Barbados) Raheim Sargeant
- (Barbados) Khalil Vanderpool-Nurse

== Women's team ==
The club's women's side, Kickstart Rush Genesis, has played in the Women’s Super League since its inception in 2022.
