= Cameron Johnson (footballer) =

American footballer (born 2004)

Personal information
- Full name: Cameron Alec Johnson Cruz
- Date of birth: 16 April 2004 (age 22)
- Place of birth: Miami, Florida, United States
- Position: Left winger

Team information
- Current team: A.D. Municipal Liberia
- Number: 29

Senior career*
| Years | Team | Apps | (Gls) |
| 2022–2023 | Inter Miami CF II | 13 | (2) |
| 2023 | Inter Miami CF | 0 | (0) |
| 2024– | A.D. Municipal Liberia | 9 | (0) |

International career
| 2022 | Costa Rica U-19 | | |
| 2023 | Costa Rica U-23 | | |
- * Club domestic league appearances and goals as of September 10, 2023

Cameron Alec Johnson Cruz (born 16 April 2004) is a professional footballer who plays as a left winger for Liga FPD club A.D. Municipal Liberia. Born in the United States, he has represented Costa Rica at the U-19 and U-23 levels.

== Club career ==
On April 30, 2022, Johnson made his professional debut in MLS Next Pro, where he came on as a substitute at the sixty-seventh minute, and two minutes later, he made his first goal and the match ended with a 3–2 defeat. On September 8, 2023, he signed a short-term deal to play with Miami's Major League Soccer side.

== International career ==
Johnson was called by coach Vladimir Quesada to represent Costa Rica for the 2022 UNCAF U-19 Tournament based in Belize. He played the three games of the first group stage of the tournament taking a role exchange. Costa Rica tied without scores against Panama (0-0), tying again this time against Guatemala, and with a much higher score against Puerto Rico (4–1). Costa Rica managed to qualify for the final against the El Salvador. In the final against the El Salvador, Johnson was a substitute in the match, Costa Rica suffering against El Salvador but managed to come back in the match ending with the score 5–4, becoming champions of the tournament, making it Johnson's first international title.

On 29 May 2023, technical director Douglas Sequeira's called for the roster of players to represent the Costa Rica U-23 team in the 2023 Maurice Revello Tournament competition, in which Johnson was part of the roster. He did not see minutes in the games against Venezuela (0–0 draw, 3-4 penalty victory) and against France (loss, 3–4) In the third game, Johnson debuted against Saudi Arabia, in which he played 61 minutes, and the match ended in a scoreless draw, losing the game on penalties 3–2, eliminating his team from the competition in the group stage. Costa Rica played a match for eleventh place, facing Qatar, Johnson was relegated to the substitute bench, without seeing minutes due to the 2–4 defeat.

== Personal life ==
Johnson is a dual citizen of Costa Rica and the United States, because his mother is Costa Rican and he was born in the United States.

== Honors ==
Costa Rica U-19

- 2022 UNCAF U-19 Tournament: Winner 2022
