= Rafael Mosquera =

Panamanian footballer (born 2005)

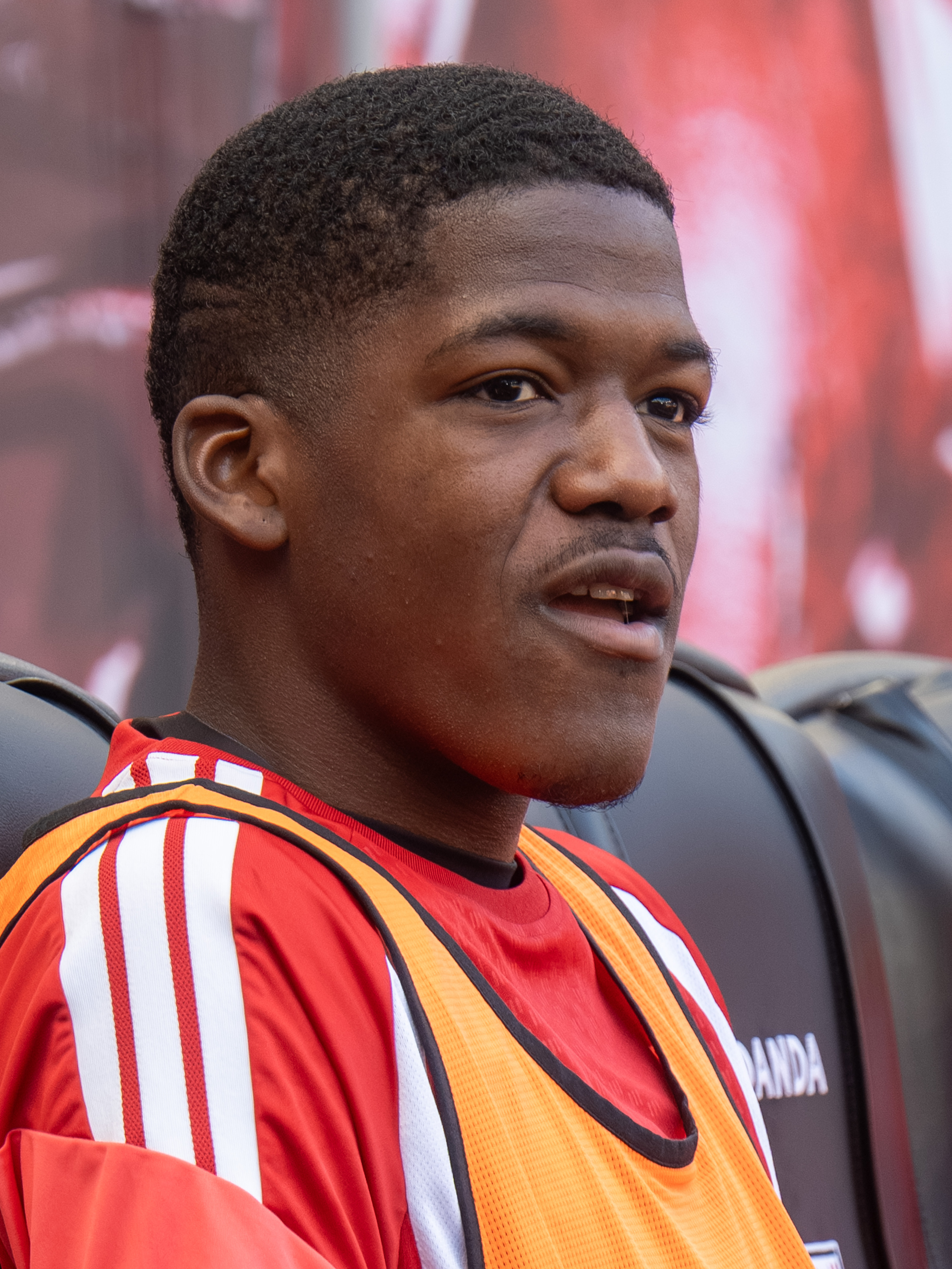
- Mosquera with the New York Red Bulls in 2026

Personal information
- Full name: Rafael Antonio Mosquera Díaz
- Date of birth: 24 May 2005 (age 21)
- Place of birth: Panama City, Panama
- Height: 1.80 m (5 ft 11 in)
- Position: Left winger

Team information
- Current team: New York Red Bulls
- Number: 79

Youth career
- Plaza Amador

Senior career*
Years	Team	Apps	(Gls)
2021–2025	Plaza Amador	25	(1)
2023–2025	→ New York Red Bulls II (loan)	44	(10)
2025	→ New York Red Bulls (loan)	1	(0)
2025–	New York Red Bulls	13	(1)
2025–	New York Red Bulls II	8	(3)

International career^{‡}
2022–	Panama U20	13	(3)
2023–	Panama U23	6	(0)
2025–	Panama	3	(0)
- * Club domestic league appearances and goals as of 21:48, 15 November 2026 (UTC) ‡ National team caps and goals as of 17:30, 5 October 2026 (UTC)

Rafael Antonio Mosquera Díaz (born 24 May 2005) is a Panamanian professional footballer who plays as a left winger for Major League Soccer club New York Red Bulls and the Panama national team.

== Club career ==
=== Plaza Amador ===
Born in Panama, Mosquera began his career with Panamanian club C.D. Plaza Amador. He graduated from Plaza Amador's youth setup, and made his senior debut during the 2021 season. On 8 May 2021, Mosquera made his league debut in a 2–0 loss against Alianza F.C. at Estadio Javier Cruz.

In February 2022, Mosquera traveled to Spain to trial with Levante UD. During September 2022, Mosquera had another trial, this time with Brazilian power Grêmio.

On 5 April 2023, Mosquera scored his first goal as a professional in a 1–1 draw with Potros del Este.

==== Loan to New York Red Bulls II ====
On 22 July 2023, it was announced that Mosquera was loaned to Red Bulls II for the remainder of the 2023 season, their first in MLS Next Pro. He made his debut for the club on 22 July in a 2–0 victory against FC Cincinnati 2 at NKU Soccer Stadium, with Mosquera assisting on New Yorks second goal. Mosquera scored his first goal for New York on 26 June 2024, in a 4–1 victory over Philadelphia Union II.

On 30 March 2025, Mosquera scored his first goal of the season in a 3–2 victory over local rival New York City FC II. Through 16 league games, Mosquera had accumulated six goals and seven assists during the 2025 season. On 8 November 2025, Mosquera scored two goals to help New York to a 3–3 tie in regulation against Colorado Rapids 2, a match New York would win 4–3, in a penalty shootout at Sports Illustrated Stadium to claim club’s first MLS NEXT Pro Cup title. Mosquera was named MVP for his performance.

=== New York Red Bulls ===
On 21 August 2025, it was announced that New York Red Bulls completed the transfer of Mosquera from C.D. Plaza Amador and signed him to a three-and-a-half-year MLS contract.

== International career ==
Mosquera was featured in Panama U20's squad at the 2022 CONCACAF U-20 Championship, earning 4 caps throughout the tournament. On 8 January 2023, Mosquera was called up by Panama U20 to participate in the 2024 UNCAF U-19 Tournament.

On 4 February 2025, Mosquera along with teammate Aimar Modelo were called up to the Panama senior team ahead of a friendly against Chile.

== Career statistics ==
=== Club ===
As of match played 6 November 2026

Appearances and goals by club, season and competition
Club	Season	League			National cup (Note: Includes U.S. Open Cup)		Continental		Other		Total	
Club	Season	Division	Apps	Goals	Apps	Goals	Apps	Goals	Apps	Goals	Apps	Goals
Plaza Amador	2021	Liga LPF	3	0	—		—		—		3	0
Plaza Amador	2022	Liga LPF	13	0	0	0	—		1 (Note: Appearance(s) in Liga Panameña de Fútbol play-offs)	0	14	0
Plaza Amador	2023	Liga LPF	9	1	0	0	—		3	0	12	1
Plaza Amador	Total		25	1	0	0	—		4	0	29	1
New York Red Bulls II (loan)	2023	MLS Next Pro	8	0	0	0	—		2 (Note: Appearance(s) in MLS Next Pro play-offs)	0	10	0
New York Red Bulls II (loan)	2024	MLS Next Pro	20	4	0	0	—		—		20	4
New York Red Bulls II (loan)	2025	MLS Next Pro	19	7	—		—		4	4	23	11
New York Red Bulls II (loan)	Total		47	11	0	0	—		6	4	53	15
New York Red Bulls (loan)	2025	Major League Soccer	1	0	0	0	—		1 (Note: Appearance in Leagues Cup)	0	2	0
New York Red Bulls	2026	Major League Soccer	13	1	2	0	—		—		15	1
New York Red Bulls	New York Red Bulls total		14	1	2	0	—		1	0	17	1
New York Red Bulls II	2026	MLS Next Pro	5	2	—		—		1	0	6	2
Career total			91	15	2	0	0	0	12	4	105	19

=== International ===
As of match played 5 October 2026

Appearances and goals by national team and year
National team	Year	Apps	Goals
Panama	2025	1	0
Panama	2026	2	0
Total		3	0
