= Time in Saint Kitts and Nevis =

- Time zone: Atlantic Standard Time
- Initials: AST
- UTC offset: UTC−4

Daylight saving time
- DST not observed

tz database
- America/St_Kitts

Saint Kitts and Nevis observes Atlantic Standard Time (UTC−4) year-round.

== IANA time zone database ==
In the IANA time zone database, Saint Kitts and Nevis is given one zone in the file zone.tab—America/St_Kitts, which is synonymous with the zone for time in Puerto Rico. Data for America/St_Kitts directly from zone.tab of the IANA time zone database; columns marked with * are the columns from zone.tab itself:

c.c.*	coordinates*	TZ*	Comments	UTC offset	DST
KN	+1718−06243	America/St_Kitts		−04:00	−04:00
