= Rudy Muñoz =

Guatemalan footballer (born 2005)

Personal information
- Full name: Rudy Josué Muñoz Boteo
- Date of birth: 6 February 2005 (age 21)
- Place of birth: San Miguel Petapa, Guatemala
- Height: 1.68 m (5 ft 6 in)
- Position: Midfielder

Team information
- Current team: Municipal
- Number: 29

Youth career
- –2021: Municipal

Senior career*
Years	Team	Apps	(Gls)
2021–	Municipal	86	(15)

International career^{‡}
2022–2024	Guatemala U20	26	(5)
2025–	Guatemala	23	(1)
Medal record
Men's football
Representing Guatemala
UNCAF U-19 Tournament
Winner	2024 Honduras
- * Club domestic league appearances and goals as of 14 September 2026 ‡ National team caps and goals as of 5 October 2026

Rudy Josué Muñoz Boteo (born 6 February 2005) is a Guatemalan professional footballer who plays as a Midfielder for Liga Bantrab club Municipal and the Guatemala national team.

== Early life ==
Rudy Muñoz began his career with Guatemalan side Municipal as an academy player.

== Club career ==
=== Municipal ===
He made his first appearance in the 2021–22 Liga Nacional de Guatemala season on 8 May 2022 against Achuapa. He won the Clausura for the 2023–24 Liga Nacional de Guatemala season, despite only having one appearance the entire season. On 22 September 2024, he scored his first goal in a brace against Zacapa in a 5–0 win. He would score another goal in the following match, El Clásico Chapín, against Comunicaciones on 29 September 2024.

== International career ==
=== Youth career ===
Rudy Muñoz would receive his first youth call up for the 2022 CONCACAF U-20 Championship. He would have five appearances in the tournament and Guatemala would qualify for the 2023 FIFA U-20 World Cup.

He was named to the U-20 squad for the 2023 FIFA U-20 World Cup in May 2023.

He was named to the Guatemala U-20 squad once again for the 2024 UNCAF U-19 Tournament, in which Guatemala won the tournament. He would win his first international honour with Guatemala, scoring two goals in four appearances.

=== Senior career ===
He would receive his first senior call up for the international break in March 2025. He would make his debut on 16 March 2025 in a 2–1 victory against Honduras.

== Style of play ==
Regarded as one of Guatemala’s best young players, Rudy commonly plays in the left side of the field. He is known for his dribbling, passing and shooting. He would receive praise by Antigua coach Javier López in an interview in which he states: "That magical left foot that's emerging at Municipal. I think he's an extraordinary player, one to be in Europe. He's perhaps the player who most catches my attention outside of what we have in Antigua."

== Career statistics ==
=== International ===
As of match played 6 October 2026

Appearances and goals by national team and year
National team	Year	Apps	Goals
Guatemala	2025	17	1
Guatemala	2026	6	0
Total		23	1

As of match played 18 November 2025
Guatemala score listed first, score column indicates score after each Muñoz goal.

List of international goals scored by Rudy Muñoz
No.	Date	Venue	Cap	Opponent	Score	Result	Competition	Ref.
1	13 November 2025	Estadio El Trébol, Guatemala City, Guatemala	16	Panama	2–2	2–3	2026 FIFA World Cup qualification	

== Honours ==
=== Municipal ===
- Liga Bantrab: Clausura 2024, Clausura 2026

=== Guatemala U20 ===
- UNCAF U-19 Tournament: 2024
