= Time in Honduras =

- Time zone: Central Standard Time
- Initials: CST
- UTC offset: UTC−6

Daylight saving time
- DST not observed

tz database
- America/Tegucigalpa

Honduras observes Central Standard Time (UTC−6) year-round.

== Daylight saving time ==
Daylight saving time was used in 1987, 1988, and 2006.

President Manuel Zelaya advanced the nationwide clock one hour forward on May 7, 2006, for three months until August 7, after which the nationwide clock was turned back one hour. The government reported energy savings of 90 million lempiras (about US$4.7 million) during the time DST was used in 2006. Honduras chose not to return to using daylight saving time the following year, with the government citing natural factors why the clock change is no longer necessary.

== IANA time zone database ==
In the IANA time zone database, Honduras is given one zone in the file zone.tab—America/Tegucigalpa. "HN" refers to the country's ISO 3166-1 alpha-2 country code. Data for Honduras directly from zone.tab of the IANA time zone database; columns marked with * are the columns from zone.tab itself:

c.c.*	coordinates*	TZ*	Comments	UTC offset	DST
HN	+1406−08713	America/Tegucigalpa		−06:00	−06:00
