= Samuel Rodríguez =

Venezuelan footballer (born 2003)

Personal information
- Full name: Samuel Rodríguez Vera
- Date of birth: 5 May 2003 (age 23)
- Place of birth: La Asunción, Venezuela
- Height: 1.93 m (6 ft 4 in)
- Position: Goalkeeper

Team information
- Current team: Portuguesa

Senior career*
Years	Team	Apps	(Gls)
2022–2023	Atlético Madrid B	1	(0)
2022–2024	Burgos Promesas		
2024–2025	Talavera de la Reina	5	(0)
2025–2026	Ávila	2	(0)
2026–	Portuguesa	0	(0)

International career^{‡}
2022–2023	Venezuela U20	4	(0)
2022	Venezuela U21	5	(0)
2024–	Venezuela U23	5	(0)
- * Club domestic league appearances and goals as of 20 September 2025 ‡ National team caps and goals as of 12 February 2024

Samuel Rodríguez Vera (born 3 May 2003) is a Venezuelan footballer who plays as a goalkeeper for Portuguesa.

== Early life ==
He was born in 2003 in Venezuela. He is a native of Margarita Island, Venezuela.

== Club career ==
He started his career with Spanish side Atlético Madrid B. In 2022, he signed for Spanish side Burgos Promesas.

== International career ==
He is a Venezuela youth international. He played for the Venezuela national under-20 football team at the 2023 South American U-20 Championship.

== Style of play ==
He operates as a goalkeeper. He is known for his reflexes.
