= Rendezvous FC =

Barbados football club

- Full name: Rendezvous Football Club
- Founded: 2002
- Ground: Emmerton Playing Field
- League: Barbados Premier League

Rendezvous FC is a Barbadian professional football club that currently plays in the Barbados Premier Division, the top level of domestic football. The club's home ground is the Emmerton Playing Field in Saint Michael.

== Crest ==
The club's crest features two hands shaking, with a flag imprinted on each sleeve: one with the flag of Barbados and the other the flag of neighboring Saint Vincent and the Grenadines.

== Achievements ==
- Barbados Premier Division Runner-Up (1): 2015
- Barbados FA Cup Winner (1): 2013
- Barbados FA Cup Runner-Up: 2015
