= Selvin Sagastume =

Guatemalan footballer (born 2007)

Personal information
- Full name: Selvin Saúl Sagastume Morales
- Date of birth: 23 November 2007 (age 18)
- Place of birth: Nueva Concepción, Escuintla, Guatemala
- Position: Midfielder

Team information
- Current team: Antigua
- Number: 54

Youth career
- 2016-2022: Nueva Concepción

Senior career*
Years	Team	Apps	(Gls)
2022	Nueva Concepción	6	(0)
2022–	Antigua	7	(1)

International career^{‡}
2023	Guatemala U17	6	(2)
2024	Guatemala U18	4	(1)
2024–	Guatemala U20	12	(6)
- * Club domestic league appearances and goals as of 1 September 2024 ‡ National team caps and goals as of 30 July 2024

Selvin Saúl Sagastume Morales (born 23 November 2007) is a Guatemalan professional footballer who plays as a midfielder for Liga Guate club Antigua.

== Club career ==
Starting off with the academy, Sagastume began his senior career with Deportivo Nueva Concepción. At just 13 years of age, he became one of the clubs youngest players to debut in a professional match.

== International career ==
=== Youth career ===
Being considered one of Guatemala’s best youth prospects, Sagastume was noticed and called up by the Guatemala national under-17 football team, Marvin Cabrera ahead of the 2023 CONCACAF U-17 Championship. At the tournament, he would score his first goal for the national under-17 team against Curaçao in a 8–3 win. Later on, in the Round of 16, he would score his second goal in a 2–1 win against Jamaica. Guatemala would later lose 5–3 in the quarter-finals against the United States.

In 2024, Sagastume was called up to represent the Guatemala national-under 18 team at the UEFA Friendship Tournament, a friendly tournament for U18 national teams. He would score in the debut game of the tournament in a 2–2 (5–3 win on penalties) against Ecuador. Guatemala finished the tournament in fifth place.
