= Barbados Football Association =

Governing body of association football in Barbados

CONCACAF
- Founded: 1910
- Headquarters: Bridgetown
- FIFA affiliation: 1968
- CONCACAF affiliation: 1967
- President: Randy Harris
- Website: www.barbadosfa.org

The Barbados Football Association is the governing body of association football in Barbados. It is responsible the administration of football in Barbados with responsibility for the Barbados national football team as well as the other Barbados National Football teams. Established in 1910, it was originally named the Barbados Football Amateur Association, but changed in 1925 to the current name. The Barbados Football Association became affiliated to FIFA in 1968, CONCACAF in 1967, and also the Caribbean Football Union.

== Association staff ==
Name	Position	Source
(Barbados) Randolph Harris	President	
(Barbados) Al Walcott	Senior Vice-president	
(Barbados) Fabian Wharton	Vice-president	
(Barbados) Christine Rock	General secretary (acting)	
n/a	Treasurer	
(Barbados) Mark Nunes	Technical director	
(Barbados) Kent Hall	Team coach (men's)	
(Barbados) Kerry Trotman	Team coach (women's)	
(Barbados) Amy Goulding	Media/communications manager	
n/a	Futsal Coordinator	
n/a	Chairperson of the Referees Committee	
(Barbados) Victor Moore	Head/Director of the Referees Department	
(Barbados) Victor Moore	Referee coordinator	

== See also ==
- Geography of association football
- List of football associations by date of foundation#Caribbean Zone (CFU)
