= Wotton FC =

- Full name: Wotton Football Club
- Founded: 1979; 47 years ago
- Ground: Wildey Turf
- Capacity: 2,000
- League: Division One
- 2026: Barbados Premier League 10th (relegated)
- Website: Website

Wotton FC is a Barbadian football club based in Wotton, Christ Church that currently competes in the Barbados Premier League, the top tier of football in Barbados.

== History ==
Wotton FC finished bottom of the league table in 2026 and were relegated back to the Division One for the following season, along with St. Andrew Lions FC.
