= Anguilla national under-20 football team =

Anguilla U-20
- Association: Anguilla Football Association
- Confederation: CONCACAF (North America)
- Sub-confederation: CFU (Caribbean)
- FIFA code: AIA

The Anguilla national under-20 football team represents Anguilla in international football at this age level and is controlled by the Anguilla Football Association.

== See also ==
- Anguilla national football team
