= UNCAF U-19 Tournament =

UNCAF Under-19 Tournament
- Founded: 2018
- Region: Central America (UNCAF)
- Teams: 7
- Website: http://www.uncafut.com/
- 2024 UNCAF U-19 Tournament

The UNCAF Under-19 Tournament is an biennial football competition for men organised by the sport's Central American governing body, UNCAF.

== History ==
On 21 July 2018, the Central American Football Union announced through their Twitter account the launch of this new tournament. The first edition will be played in Honduras from 19 to 26 August 2018. The tournament's sole purpose is for the teams to prepare for the upcomings CONCACAF Under-20 Championships and not as a qualifier.

== Results ==
Year	Host	Winner	Runner-up
2018; Details	Honduras	Guatemala	Panama
2022; Details	Belize	Costa Rica	El Salvador
2024; Details	Honduras	Guatemala	Panama
2025; Details	Panama	Costa Rica	Panama

== Results by tournament ==
Legend

- 1st – Champions
- 2nd – Runners-up
- 3rd – Third place
- 4th – Fourth place
- GS – Group stage
- DQ – Disqualified/Suspended
- Q – Qualified for upcoming tournament
- — Hosts
- × – Did not enter
- × – Withdrew before tournament begins

Team	(Honduras) 2018	(Belize) 2022	(Honduras) 2024	(Panama) 2025	Total
Belize	7th	8th	6th	x	3
Costa Rica	3rd	1st	4th	1st	4
El Salvador	6th	2nd	7th	8th	4
Guatemala	1st	6th	1st	4th	4
Honduras	4th	5th	3rd	3rd	4
Nicaragua	5th	4th	5th	6th	4
Panama	2nd	3rd	2nd	2nd	4
Guest teams
Cuba	×	x	8th	7th	2
Puerto Rico	×	7th	×	5th	2

== See also ==
- UNCAF U-16 Tournament
