= Football in Barbados =

- Country: Barbados
- Governing body: Barbados Football Association
- National team: Men's national team

International competitions
- CONCACAF Champions League; CONCACAF League; FIFA Club World Cup; CONCACAF Gold Cup (National Team); CONCACAF Nations League (National Team); FIFA World Cup (National Team); CONCACAF Women's Championship (National Team); FIFA Women's World Cup (National Team)

Football is one of the most popular sports in Barbados.

== The Barbados Football Association ==
The Barbados Football Association (BFA) is the governing body of football in Barbados. It was established in 1910.

== League system ==
Level	League(s)/Division(s)
1	Digicel Premier League; 10 clubs
2	First Division; 12 clubs
3	Division Two; 46 clubs divided in 4 series, two of 12 clubs and two of 11 clubs
4	Division Three; 46 clubs divided in 4 series, three of 12 clubs and one of 10 clubs

== National teams ==
Barbados has had limited success a national team.

A Barbados women's national football team, Barbados men's national under-17 football team, Barbados men's national under-15 football team, Barbados women's national under-17 and women's under-15 team also compete.

== Football stadiums ==
Stadium	Capacity	Tenants
Barbados National Stadium	5,000	Barbados national football team, Notre Dame SC

== Attendances ==
The average attendance per top-flight football league season and the club with the highest average attendance:

Season	League average	Best club	Best club average
2017	194	Weymouth Wales	613

Source: League page on Wikipedia

== See also ==
- Barbados men's national football team
- Barbados men's national under-17 football team
- Barbados women's national football team
- Barbados Football Association
- Barbados Premier League
- Sport in Barbados
