= 2018 UNCAF U-19 Tournament =

Tournament details
- Host country: Honduras
- City: Comayagua and Siguatepeque
- Dates: 19–26 August
- Teams: 7 (from UNCAF sub-confederations)
- Venue(s): 2 (in 2 host cities)

Final positions
- Champions: Guatemala (1st title)
- Runners-up: Panama
- Third place: Costa Rica
- Fourth place: Honduras

Tournament statistics
- Matches played: 21
- Goals scored: 67 (3.19 per match)
- All statistics correct as of 26 August 2018.

The 2018 UNCAF U-19 Tournament is a football competition scheduled to take place in August 2018.

It is to prepare teams for the 2018 CONCACAF U-20 Championship.

== Venues ==
Siguatepeque	2018 UNCAF U-19 Tournament is located in Honduras	Comayagua
Estadio Roberto Martínez Ávila	2018 UNCAF U-19 Tournament is located in Honduras	Estadio Carlos Miranda
14.59008°N 87.841342°W	2018 UNCAF U-19 Tournament is located in Honduras	14.453778°N 87.656839°W
Capacity: 7,000	2018 UNCAF U-19 Tournament is located in Honduras	Capacity: 10,000

== Standings ==
Pos	Team	Pld	W	D	L	GF	GA	GD	Pts
1	Guatemala	6	5	1	0	9	1	+8	16
2	Panama	6	5	0	1	15	6	+9	15
3	Costa Rica	6	3	2	1	16	7	+9	11
4	Honduras (H)	6	2	1	3	11	11	0	7
5	Nicaragua	6	1	1	4	7	10	−3	4
6	El Salvador	6	1	1	4	5	15	−10	4
7	Belize	6	1	0	5	4	17	−13	3

Rules for classification: 1) Points; 2) Goal difference; 3) Number of goals scored;
(H) Hosts

== Matches ==
19 August 2018
14:00

Guatemala	1–1	Costa Rica

Estadio Carlos Miranda, Comayagua
19 August 2018
16:15

El Salvador	1–5	Panama

Estadio Carlos Miranda, Comayagua
19 August 2018
18:30

Honduras	6–1	Belize

Estadio Carlos Miranda, Comayagua

20 August 2018
14:00

Panama	0–1	Guatemala

Estadio Roberto Martínez Ávila, Siguatepeque
20 August 2018
16:15

Belize	1–3	El Salvador

Estadio Roberto Martínez Ávila, Siguatepeque
20 August 2018
18:30

Honduras	3–3	Nicaragua

Estadio Roberto Martínez Ávila, Siguatepeque

21 August 2018
14:00

Costa Rica	3–4	Panama

Estadio Carlos Miranda, Comayagua
21 August 2018
16:15

Nicaragua	0–1	Belize

Estadio Carlos Miranda, Comayagua
21 August 2018
18:30

Honduras	2–0	El Salvador

Estadio Carlos Miranda, Comayagua

22 August 2018
14:00

Panama	2–1	Nicaragua

Estadio Roberto Martínez Ávila, Siguatepeque
22 August 2018
16:15

El Salvador	1–1	Costa Rica

Estadio Roberto Martínez Ávila, Siguatepeque
22 August 2018
18:30

Honduras	0–1	Guatemala

Estadio Roberto Martínez Ávila, Siguatepeque

24 August 2018
14:00

Costa Rica	5–1	Belize

Estadio Carlos Miranda, Comayagua
24 August 2018
16:15

Nicaragua	0–2	Guatemala

Estadio Carlos Miranda, Comayagua
24 August 2018
18:30

Honduras	0–2	Panama

Estadio Carlos Miranda, Comayagua

25 August 2018
14:00

Guatemala	3–0	El Salvador

Estadio Roberto Martínez Ávila, Siguatepeque
25 August 2018
16:15

Panama	2–0	Belize

Estadio Roberto Martínez Ávila, Siguatepeque
25 August 2018
18:30

Costa Rica	2–0	Nicaragua

Estadio Roberto Martínez Ávila, Siguatepeque

26 August 2018
14:00

Belize	0–1	Guatemala

Estadio Carlos Miranda, Comayagua
26 August 2018
16:15

Nicaragua	3–0	El Salvador

Estadio Carlos Miranda, Comayagua
26 August 2018
18:30

Honduras	0–4	Costa Rica

Estadio Carlos Miranda, Comayagua
