= Central American Football Union =

Regional body of CONCACAF for association football in the Central American Zone

Central American Football Union Unión Centroamericana de Fútbol

- Members of UNCAF (orange).
- Abbreviation: UNCAF
- Formation: 1990
- Type: Regional body of CONCACAF
- Region served: Central America
- Members: 7 members: Belize; Costa Rica; El Salvador; Guatemala; Honduras; Nicaragua; Panama
- Official language: Spanish; English
- President: Rafael Tinoco
- Website: uncafut.com

The Unión Centroamericana de Fútbol (Central American Football Union), also known by its acronym UNCAF, is a regional body of CONCACAF for association football in the Central American Zone. Officially established in 1990; it has 7 member associations: Belize, Costa Rica, El Salvador, Guatemala, Honduras, Nicaragua and Panama.

The UNCAF organizes regional competitions for national teams and clubs, its premier competition for national teams was the Copa Centroamericana and its premier club competition was the Copa Interclubes UNCAF.

== Members ==
Code	Country	Association	Acronym
BLZ	Belize	Football Federation of Belize	FFB
CRC	Costa Rica	Costa Rican Football Federation	FCRF
SLV	El Salvador	Salvadoran Football Federation	FESFUT
GUA	Guatemala	Football Federation of Guatemala	FFG
HON	Honduras	Football Federation of Honduras	FFH
NCA	Nicaragua	Nicaraguan Football Federation	FENIFUT
PAN	Panama	Panamanian Football Federation	FEPAFUT

== Competitions ==
=== Overview ===
Older logo

The UNCAF organize various competitions. The Copa Centroamericana was played every two years from 1991 until 2017, and usually featured the seven national teams. Costa Rica is the most successful team, winning the tournament eight times. Honduras won the tournament four times while Guatemala and Panama won once each. This tournament usually ran as a qualification round for the CONCACAF Gold Cup.

The UNCAF also ran the Copa Interclubes UNCAF, a competition for the champions and runners-up of the domestic leagues of the UNCAF members; C.D. Motagua (Honduras) was the last champion (2007). Similarly to the Copa Centroamericana, this competition qualified three teams to the CONCACAF Champions' Cup. As it expanded into the CONCACAF Champions League in 2008, all of the Central American nations have at least one team and the Copa Interclubes UNCAF was disbanded.

=== National teams ===
- Copa Centroamericana – Was the International tournament for Central America, top 4–5 qualify for the CONCACAF Gold Cup.

=== Club teams ===
- Copa Interclubes UNCAF – Was a club championship for Central America in which the top 3 teams qualified for CONCACAF Champions' Cup.
- UNCAF Women's Interclub Championship – First edition held in 2016.

UNCAF runs several competitions which cover men's, women's, youth and futsal.

=== Current title holders ===
Competition	Year	Champions	Title	Runners-up	Next edition	Dates
National teams
Copa Centroamericana	2017	Honduras	4th	Panama	Abolished	
U-23 Tournament	2015	Honduras	Unknown	Unknown	TBA	
U-19 Tournament	2025	Costa Rica		Panama		
U-18 Tournament	2019	Costa Rica	Unknown	Unknown	TBA	
U-17 Tournament	2016	Costa Rica	Unknown	Honduras	2024	
U-16 Tournament	2026	El Salvador		Panama	TBA	
U-15 Tournament	2023	Guatemala	Unknown	Costa Rica	TBA	
Futsal Tournament	2016	Guatemala	Unknown	Panama	TBA	
Futsal U20 Tournament	2022	Nicaragua	1st	Costa Rica	TBA	
Beach Soccer Cup	2018	El Salvador	Unknown	Panama	TBA	
National teams (women)
Women's Copa Centroamericana	2018	Costa Rica	Unknown	Panama	TBA	
Women's U-19 Tournament	2026	Costa Rica		Honduras	TBA	
Women's U-17 Tournament	2024	Costa Rica	Unknown	Panama	TBA	
Women's U-16 Tournament	2025	Puerto Rico	Unknown	El Salvador	2026	
Club teams
Central American Cup	2025	(Costa Rica) LD Alajuelense	3rd	(Guatemala) Xelajú	2026	
U-17 Interclub Cup	2022	(Panama) Plaza Amador	1st	(Honduras) AFFI Academia	TBD	
Club teams (women)
Women's Interclub Championship	2026	(Guatemala) UNIFUT	2nd	(Costa Rica) LD Alajuelense	2027	

== Major tournament records ==
=== National teams appearances in international tournaments ===
National team	World Cup	Women's World Cup	Gold Cup	Women's Championship	W Gold Cup
Costa Rica	6	2	11	2	1
Honduras	3	0	11	0	0
El Salvador	2	0	8	1	1
Guatemala	0	0	9	1	0
Panama	2	1	8	2	1
Belize	0	0	1	0	0
Nicaragua	0	0	2	0	0

== See also ==
- CONCACAF Central American Cup
- Caribbean Football Union (CFU)
- North American Football Union (NAFU)
- North American Football Confederation (NAFC)
- Confederación Centroamericana y del Caribe de Fútbol (CCCF)
