= Yarde (surname) =

Yarde is an English surname. Notable people with the surname include:

- Anthony Yarde (born 1991), English boxer
- Brian Courtenay Yarde (1905–1986), Royal Air Force officer
- Denise Yarde, British sound engineer
- Edward Yarde (1638–1703), English politician
- Edward Yarde (1669–1735), English politician
- Gilbert Yarde (1673–1707), English Member of Parliament
- Jason Yarde (born 1970), British musician and composer
- Kevin Yarde, Canadian politician and television meteorologist
- Margaret Yarde (1878–1944), British actress
- Marland Yarde (born 1992), England international rugby union player
- Merlon Yarde (born 1944), Barbadian cricketer
- Richard Yarde (1939–2011), American painter
- Sherlock Yarde (died 2012), Barbadian football administrator and manager
