= Gaab =

Gaab may refer to:

== People ==
- Ahmed Mohamed Ahmed (Gaab), Swiss-Somali footballer
- Gaab (singer), Brazilian singer and composer
- Johann Friedrich Gaab, German theologian
- Michael R. Gaab, German neurological surgeon

== Other uses ==
- gaab, alternative word for Syahi, a musical tuning paste
- GAAB, acronym for Georgia and Alabama Railroad

== See also ==
- Gaabu
- GAA Beo
