= Emil Berggreen =

Danish footballer (born 1993)

Personal information
- Date of birth: 10 May 1993 (age 33)
- Place of birth: Ålsgårde, Denmark
- Height: 1.94 m (6 ft 4 in)
- Position: Forward

Team information
- Current team: U.S. Virgin Islands (assistant)

Youth career
- Frem Hellebæk
- BSV
- 2011–2012: Nordsjælland

Senior career*
Years	Team	Apps	(Gls)
2012–2014	Brønshøj	57	(15)
2014	Hobro	17	(3)
2015–2016	Eintracht Braunschweig	26	(11)
2016–2019	Mainz 05	14	(4)
2017	Mainz 05 II	3	(0)
2019–2020	Twente	13	(1)
2020–2022	Greuther Fürth	4	(0)
2021–2022	Greuther Fürth II	9	(4)
2022–2024	SønderjyskE	29	(11)
2025	Rovers SC	1	(1)
Total		173	(50)

International career
2014–2015	Denmark U21	6	(1)

Managerial career
- 2025–: U.S. Virgin Islands (assistant)
- * Club domestic league appearances and goals

Emil Berggreen (born 10 May 1993) is a Danish former professional footballer who played as a forward.

== Career ==
=== Brønshøj ===
Brønshøj Boldklub signed Berggreen from FC Nordsjælland in the summer 2012. In his first half season, Berggreen played 2 matches as a substitute for the first team and scored one goal, while he also scored 10 goals in 6 matches for the U21 squad. He signed a contract extension in January 2013 for two years. Berggreen had an excellent second half season, where he in total played 21 games and scored 12 goals. After this season, Berggreen had bids from clubs in the Danish Superliga and the Danish 1st Division.

=== Hobro IK ===
On 20 June 2014, Hobro IK signed Berggreen on a three-year contract. He made his debut in the Danish first-tier for Hobro IK during the first half of the 2014–15 Superliga season.

He scored his first goal for the club in September after he had not scored in the first 13 games. After a great period in the fall, he attracted much attention from other clubs.

=== Eintracht Braunschweig ===
On 31 January 2015, Berggreen signed a 2 1/2-year contract with German 2. Bundesliga club Eintracht Braunschweig. On 8 February 2015, he made his debut for Braunschweig. He came on as a substitute in an 0–2 defeat on the 20th matchday against 1.FC Kaiserslautern, replacing Raffael Korte in the 69th minute. On 23 February 2015, made his debut in the starting line-up, in a 1–1 draw on the 22nd matchday against RB Leipzig, also scoring his first goal for Eintracht Braunschweig. On 25 May 2015, he came on as a substitute on the 31st matchday against FSV Frankfurt and contributed two goals to the 2–0 victory of his team.

=== Mainz 05 ===
Berggreen moved to 1. FSV Mainz 05 on 31 January 2016. Hobro IK received about 2 million Danish crowns for the sale. A month after his arrival, he was injured and had to get his knee operated. He was back in training in the summer 2016. Weeks after his return, he suffered an anterior cruciate ligament injury and was out the rest of the season. By summer 2017, Berggreen had not made his debut yet.

=== Twente ===
On 17 July 2019, Berggreen joined FC Twente on a one-year contract with an option for one further year.

=== Greuther Fürth ===
In September 2020, free agent Berggreen returned to Germany joining 2. Bundesliga side SpVgg Greuther Fürth on a two-year contract. His contract was terminated by mutual consent on 1 January 2022, effectively making him a free agent again.

=== SønderjyskE ===
Berggreen signed with Danish Superliga club SønderjyskE on 31 January 2022, after having practiced with the Midtjylland first team through January. He signed a one-and-a-half-year deal. On 29 May 2024 SønderjyskE confirmed that Berggreen would not extend his contract at the club and would therefore leave SønderjyskE after the season.

=== Later career ===
Berggreen announced his retirement from football on 13 November 2024. He then started a podcast called 'Presbold' with Jannick Liburd and Peter Piil, as well as a podcast called 'Akademiet' with the well-known Danish commentator, Zak Egholm.

In 2025, it was revealed out of the blue that Berggren was playing football for the U.S. Virgin Islands club Rovers SC, despite having retired from the sport the previous year. In an interview in August 2025, Berggren explained that the move came about through his former Sønderjyske teammate, Jannick Liburd, who was playing for the club. However, Berggren only played two matches for the club in the CFU Club Shield and one match in the USVISF Premier League, where he also scored the match-winning goal.

Following those matches, Berggreen explained further in the interview that he would not be playing any more games for Rovers SC. Instead, he had been hired for two weeks as an assistant coach for the U.S. Virgin Islands national team.

== International career ==
On 9 September 2014, Berggreen made his debut for the Danish U21 national team, and became the first Hobro player to ever represent a Danish national team at any level, scoring a goal in his debut.

== Personal life ==
Berggreen's mother is from Croatia, so he can both represent Denmark and Croatia in international football.
