= Ramesses McGuiness =

U.S. Virgin Islands soccer player

Ramesses Moore-McGuinness
Personal information
- Full name: Ramesses Moore-McGuinness
- Date of birth: January 6, 2000 (age 26)
- Place of birth: Saint Croix, US Virgin Islands
- Height: 1.78 m (5 ft 10 in)
- Position: Forward

Team information
- Current team: Pittsburgh City United
- Number: 10

College career
| Years | Team | Apps | (Gls) |
| 2018 | Kean Cougars | 17 | (5) |

Senior career*
| Years | Team | Apps | (Gls) |
| 2021– | Pittsburgh City United | 5 | (3) |

International career^{‡}
| 2018 | US Virgin Islands U20 | 5 | (1) |
| 2019– | US Virgin Islands | 11 | (1) |
- * Club domestic league appearances and goals ‡ National team caps and goals as of March 23, 2023

Ramesses Moore-McGuinness (born January 6, 2000) is a U.S. Virgin Islands soccer player who currently plays for Pittsburgh City United FC of the UPSL, and the US Virgin Islands national team.

Born and raised Saint Croix, McGuiness moved with his brothers to West Windsor, New Jersey in 2015 and attended West Windsor-Plainsboro High School South, where he played prep soccer. He has also reached minor success online on TikTok.

== College career ==
McGuinness played one year of college soccer for the Cougars of Kean University. In total he made seventeen appearances for the team, scoring five goals.

== Club career ==
In August 2021 it was announced that McGuiness signed for Pittsburgh City United FC of the United Premier Soccer League, the fourth tier of the United States soccer league system for the 2021 season. He was joined at the club by USVI national teammate Jett Blaschka.

== International career ==
Ramesses was part of the USVI under-20 squad that competed at the 2018 CONCACAF U-20 Championship held in the United States. He scored against Suriname in a defeat in the teams' opening match.

Ramesses made his senior international debut on October 12, 2019, in a 2019–20 CONCACAF Nations League qualifying match against Barbados. On 19 November 2019 he scored his first senior goal for USVI against Saint Martin in the 2019–20 CONCACAF Nations League C.

=== International goals ===
Scores and results list USVI's goal tally first.

| No | Date | Venue | Opponent | Score | Result | Competition |
|---|---|---|---|---|---|---|
| 1. | November 19, 2019 | Bethlehem Soccer Stadium, Upper Bethlehem, U.S. Virgin Islands | Saint Martin | 1–2 | 1–2 | 2019–20 CONCACAF Nations League C |
Last updated 12 October 2019

=== International career statistics ===
As of match played June 11, 2022.

USVI national team
| Year | Apps | Goals |
|---|---|---|
| 2019 | 4 | 1 |
| 2020 | 0 | 0 |
| 2021 | 5 | 0 |
| 2022 | 2 | 0 |
| Total | 11 | 1 |
