= Colin Forde =

Colin Forde may refer to:

- Colin Forde (Gaelic footballer) (born 1990), Irish sportsperson
- Colin Forde (cyclist) (born 1949), Barbadian cyclist
- Colin Forde (footballer, born 1963), Barbadian football manager, coach and former footballer
