= Terrence Jones (disambiguation) =

Terrence Jones (born 1992) is an American basketball player.

Terrence Jones may also refer to:

- Terrence Jones (athlete) (born 2002), Bahamian sprinter
- Terrence Jones (gridiron football) (born 1966), American football quarterback
- Terrence Jones (soccer) (born 1968), U.S. Virgin Islands soccer player

== See also ==
- Terence Jones (1942–2020), Welsh comedian
