= AS Adema 149–0 SO l'Emyrne =

Football match

- Event: THB Champions League playoff
AS Adema	SO l'Emyrne
149	0
- Date: 31 October 2002
- Venue: Barikadimy Stadium, Toamasina

AS Adema 149–0 SO l'Emyrne was an association football match that took place in Toamasina, Madagascar on 31 October 2002. It holds the world record for the highest scoreline in football history, as recognised by The Guinness Book of Records. Stade Olympique de l'Emyrne (SOE) intentionally lost to rivals AS Adema in a self-orchestrated protest over unfavourable refereeing decisions in a previous match that cost them the national championship. Prior to that day, the previous highest scoreline was 36–0 to Arbroath F.C. over Bon Accord F.C. in the Scottish Cup in 1885.

== Pre-match ==
Rivals SOE and Adema had met in the finals of the 2001 Malagasy national league, with SOE winning 1-0. After winning the league, SOE entered the 2002 CAF Champions League, where they reached the second round of the tournament by upsetting Angolan powerhouse Petro Atlético. They missed qualifying for the group stage by a single goal, losing 2-3 on aggregate to the Mozambican club CD Costa do Sol. Adema qualified for the 2002 CAF Cup as the league runner-up, where they lost in the quarterfinals to Egyptian club Al Masry SC.

The 2002 season of the Malagasy national league (then called the THB Champions League) consisted of two stages. In the first stage, each of the seven top-flight teams played each other once. The top four teams from the first stage qualified for the double-round-robin final stage to crown the champion. SOE won the first stage by a single point over Adema, and the clubs were joined by DSA Antananarivo (DSA) and Union Sportive Ambohidratrimo (USA) for the final stage.

The final stage consisted of a round-robin tournament between the four teams in the league, with each team playing the others twice. In their first meeting of the finals, Adema beat SOE 1-0. After four of the six matchdays, Adema led the league with seven points, while SOE was tied for second with five points. Adema defeated USA in their match, meaning that SOE had to defeat DSA in their match to have a chance at winning the league. SOE were leading 2-1 when the referee awarded a late controversial penalty to DSA, which they converted. The game ended as a 2-2 draw. As a result, Adema clinched the championship with a match still remaining in the tournament.

== Match ==
SOE and Adema were two of the best teams in Madagascar, with many of their players on the national team. When the 31st of October came, what should have been a tight match to conclude the season turned into an unprecedented spectacle. SOE no longer could win the tournament, and blamed refereeing bias for costing them their shot at the title. Adema took the opening kickoff, but once SOE gained possession, Adema would not regain it for the rest of the match. Instead, SOE's players took turns kicking the ball into their own net a total of 149 times, averaging approximately 36 seconds per own goal scored, while the opposition and referee looked on bemusedly. According to local news, spectators approached the ticket booths requesting refunds.

== Post-match ==
Following the match, the Malagasy Football Federation (FMF) suspended SOE coach Ratsimandresy Ratsarazaka for three years and banned him from attending any matches during the suspension. Four of the SOE team's players, captain Manitranirina Andrianiaina, goalkeeper Mamisoa Razafindrakoto (then-captain of the Madagascar national football team), Dominique Rakotonandrasana, and Nicolas Rakotoarimanana, were suspended for the entire 2003 season. All other players from both teams were threatened with more serious action should they commit further offenses. The referee was not punished as the situation was deemed to be out of his control.

Madagascar's sports ministry announced that they had dissolved the national federation (FMF), but they reconstituted the federation shortly thereafter. The FMF nullified all of SOE's 2002 results and the club dissolved in 2006, though no direct link was officially cited. The players rarely spoke about the game afterward.

As winners of the 2002 Malagasy championship, AS Adema qualified for the 2003 CAF Champions League. They lost to AS Saint-Louisienne of Réunion in the preliminary round. DSA, the team whose late-game penalty inspired SOE's protest, took second place in the league and competed in the 2003 CAF Cup. They lost in the first round to the Seychellois team St Michel United.

== See also ==
- Barbados 4–2 Grenada, where a Barbadian defender deliberately scored an own goal so his team could win by two goals in extra time according to an unconventional golden goal rule
- Thailand 3–2 Indonesia, where defender Mursyid Effendi deliberately scored an own goal for Indonesia to avoid hosts Vietnam in the 1998 AFF Championship semi-finals
