= Jett Blaschka =

US Virgin Islands association footballer

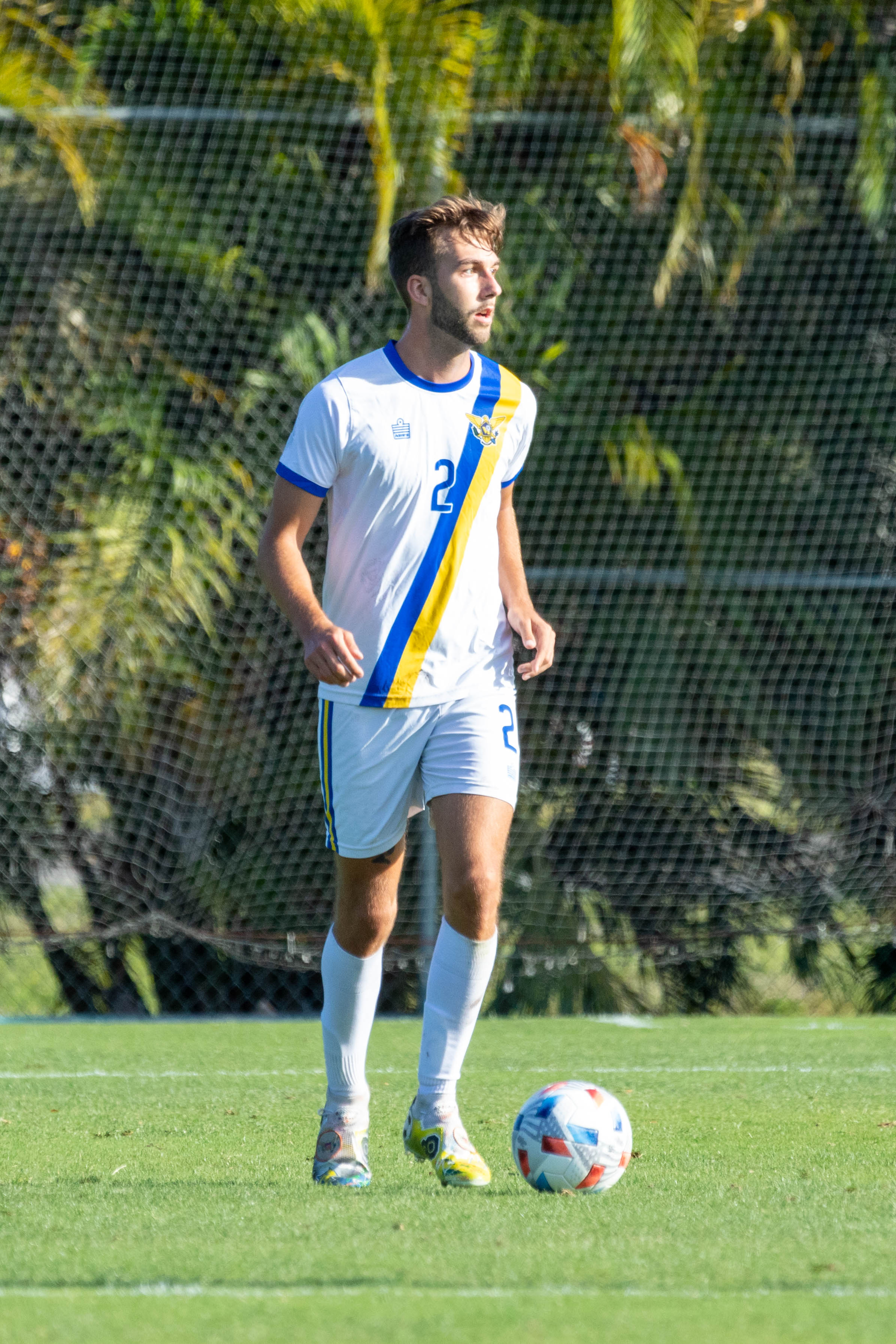

Personal information
- Date of birth: 16 September 1999 (age 27)
- Place of birth: Racine, Wisconsin, United States
- Height: 6 ft 2 in (1.88 m)
- Positions: Right back; midfielder

Youth career
- Milwaukee Bavarian SC
- 2016–2018: Montverde Academy

College career
Years	Team	Apps	(Gls)
2018–2019	Marquette Golden Eagles	0	(0)

Senior career*
Years	Team	Apps	(Gls)
2019–2020	Treasure Coast Tritons	0	(0)
2021–2022	Pittsburgh City United	14	(5)
2022–2023	Manchester 62	14	(0)

International career^{‡}
2018–	United States Virgin Islands	28	(1)
- * Club domestic league appearances and goals as of 22:36, 26 November 2025 (UTC) ‡ National team caps and goals as of 22:36, 26 November 2025 (UTC)

Jett Blaschka (born 16 September 1999) is a footballer who last played as a right-back or midfielder for Gibraltar Football League club Manchester 62. Born in the United States, he plays for the United States Virgin Islands national team.

== Youth career ==
Prior to moving to USVI, Blaschka played for the youth academy of Milwaukee Bavarian SC. As a high school freshman he played for the Good Hope Country Day School in Saint Croix. Half way through his freshman year he attended Montverde Academy in Montverde, Florida where he was a three sport varsity athlete in soccer, cross country and track. He helped lead the soccer team to three-straight unbeaten seasons (32-0-5) en route to three-straight national championships.

== College career ==
Blaschka was recruited Marquette University in 2018 to play for their Golden Eagles soccer team. He earned Big East all academic team and redshirted his freshman year.

== Club career ==
For the 2019 season, Blaschka joined the Treasure Coast Tritons of the USL League 2. However he did not make any appearances for the club during that year. In August 2021 it was announced that Blaschka signed for Pittsburgh City United FC of the United Premier Soccer League, the fourth tier of the United States soccer league system for the 2021 season. He was joined at the club by USVI national teammates Ramesses McGuiness and Dante Nicholas. Blaschka was tied for second on the team with five goals and finished first on the team with six assists n 12 matches and won team MVP. For his performances he was named UPSL Northeast team of the week 3 times in twelve matches which put him in a two way tie for most in all of UPSL Northeast.

In July 2022 it was announced that Blaschka had made the move to Europe, signing for Manchester 62 of the Gibraltar National League.

== International career ==
Blaschka moved to the United States Virgin Islands from Wisconsin at age 9. At the age of 13 he captained the island's under-15 national team. In 2014 he again captained the team at age 14 during 2015 CONCACAF U-17 Championship qualifying. He made his senior international debut on October 12, 2018 in a 2019–20 CONCACAF Nations League qualifying match against Curaçao.

=== Statistics ===
As of match played 8 August 2025

National team	Year	Apps	Goals
United States Virgin Islands
United States Virgin Islands	2018	2	0
United States Virgin Islands	2019	7	0
United States Virgin Islands	2020	0	0
United States Virgin Islands	2021	3	0
United States Virgin Islands	2022	4	0
United States Virgin Islands	2023	4	0
United States Virgin Islands	2024	6	1
United States Virgin Islands	2025	2	0
Total		28	1

As of match played 8 August 2025
United States Virgin Islands score listed first, score column indicates score after each Blaschka goal.

List of international goals scored by Jett Blaschka
No.	Date	Venue	Cap	Opponent	Score	Result	Competition	Ref.
1	March 22, 2024	Bethlehem Soccer Stadium, Kingshill, United States Virgin Islands	22	British Virgin Islands	1–0	1–1	2026 FIFA World Cup qualification	
