= Dylan Ramos =

United States Virgin Islands soccer player (born 2001)

Personal information
- Date of birth: August 6, 2001 (age 25)
- Place of birth: Sebring, Florida, United States
- Position: Goalkeeper

Team information
- Current team: Kamphaengphet FC
- Number: 1

Senior career*
Years	Team	Apps	(Gls)
–2021	Winter Haven United FC		
2021–2022	Lakeland United FC		
2023	Gold Star FC		
2024–2025	Savannah Clovers FC		
2025–	Kamphaengphet FC		

International career^{‡}
2023–	United States Virgin Islands	10	(0)
- * Club domestic league appearances and goals ‡ National team caps and goals as of 25 March 2026

Dylan Ramos (born 6 August 2001) is a professional soccer player who plays as a goalkeeper for Kamphaengphet FC. Born in the United States, he is a United States Virgin Islands international.

== Early life ==
Ramos was born on 6 August 2001 in Sebring, Florida, United States. Born to a United States Virgin Islands father and an American mother, he is the younger brother of United States Virgin Island international Joshua Ramos. Growing up, he attended Avon Park High School in the United States.

== Club career ==
Ramos started his career with American side Winter Haven United FC. Following his stint there, he signed for American side Lakeland United FC in 2021. Ahead of the 2023 season, he signed for American side Gold Star FC. Subsequently, he signed for American side Savannah Clovers FC in 2024. One year later, he signed for Thai side Kamphaengphet FC.

== International career ==
Ramos is a United States Virgin Islands international. During the spring of 2024, he played for the United States Virgin Islands national soccer team for 2026 FIFA World Cup qualification.
