= Dusty Good =

Personal information
- Full name: Dusty Good
- Date of birth: March 30, 1987 (age 39)
- Place of birth: Cotati, California, United States
- Height: 5 ft 10 in (1.78 m)
- Position: Defensive midfielder

Team information
- Current team: New Vibes

Youth career
- 2006–2007: Sonoma State Seawolves

Senior career*
Years	Team	Apps	(Gls)
2008–2011	New Vibes		
2011	Råtorps IK		
2012–2013	FBK Karlstad		
2013–2014	Positive Vibes		
2014–	New Vibes		

International career^{‡}
2011–	US Virgin Islands	18	(0)
- * Club domestic league appearances and goals ‡ National team caps and goals as of 21:46, March 26, 2021 (UTC)

Dusty Good (born March 30, 1987) is a soccer player and captain for the United States Virgin Islands national soccer team, currently playing for New Vibes of the St. Thomas League.

== College ==
Good played college soccer for the Seawolves of Sonoma State University beginning as a freshman in 2006. In 2006, Good traveled with the team to Europe to compete against academy sides of top clubs from Belgium, Germany, and the Netherlands. Good scored multiple goals in several matches, including a brace against ODB of the Netherlands.

== Club career ==
Good played for local USVI squads before moving to Europe to play for lower division sides such as FBK Karlstad in the Swedish Fourth Division. He first went to Sweden in April 2011 to meet the family of his Swedish girlfriend. He played several matches for Råtorps IK before having a successful trial with Karlstad. He also had stints in the lower tiers of Denmark and England, for which his mother holds a passport.

== International career ==
Born in Cotati, California, Good moved to the US Virgin Islands in his late teens. He was asked to join a local team after being spotted wearing a Liverpool jersey in a local grocery store. He was soon asked to play for the United States Virgin Islands national team during 2014 FIFA World Cup qualification, despite being previously unaware that it existed. He made his debut on October 7, 2011 in a 0–7 defeat to Haiti. Good was one of only four players who returned to the squad for the 2018 World Cup qualification cycle and was named squad captain.

== Beyond football ==
In 2007, Dusty Good and his father, Stan Good, founded Good Day Charters with one 18' powerboat named Striper that was towed from California to Florida and then shipped to the Virgin Islands. The boat charters and boat rental idea originated after visiting St. Thomas a few years earlier during a cruise. Dusty and the Good family packed up their belongings including the dogs, and moved to St. Thomas.
