= United States Virgin Islands national soccer team =

National association football team

U.S. Virgin Islands
- Nickname: The Dashing Eagles
- Association: U.S. Virgin Islands Soccer Federation (USVISF)
- Confederation: CONCACAF (North America)
- Sub-confederation: CFU (Caribbean)
- Head coach: Terrence Jones
- Captain: Joshua Ramos
- Most caps: Jett Blaschka (26)
- Top scorer: Jannick Liburd (4)
- Home stadium: Bethlehem Soccer Stadium
- FIFA code: VIR
First colors	Second colors

FIFA ranking
- Current: 206 (November 18, 2026)
- Highest: 149 (July 2011)
- Lowest: 208 (March 2022, November 2023)

First international
- U.S. Virgin Islands 1–0 British Virgin Islands (U.S. Virgin Islands; March 21, 1998)

Biggest win
- Unofficial; Marshall Islands 0–4 U.S. Virgin Islands (Springdale, United States; August 14, 2025); Official; Anguilla 0–3 U.S. Virgin Islands (The Valley, Anguilla; March 22, 2019); U.S. Virgin Islands 5–2 American Samoa (Bayamón, Puerto Rico; March 25, 2026)

Biggest defeat
- Saint Lucia 14–1 U.S. Virgin Islands (Port-au-Prince, Haiti; April 14, 2001)

The United States Virgin Islands national soccer team, officially designated as US Virgin Islands by FIFA, represents the United States Virgin Islands, an unincorporated territory of the United States in men's international soccer, and is governed by the U.S. Virgin Islands Soccer Federation, the governing body for football in the U.S. Virgin Islands founded in 1987. It has been a full member of FIFA and CONCACAF since 1998, and is also a member of CFU in the Caribbean Zone.

The US Virgin Islands has never qualified for the FIFA World Cup and the CONCACAF Gold Cup, but has participated five times in League C of the CONCACAF Nations League.

The US Virgin Islands' debut in international competitions was in the 1999 Caribbean Cup qualifying tournament, and its first appearance in World Cup qualifiers was for 2002 qualification. The team's first victory was in 1998 by defeating British Virgin Islands 1–0, which was also its first match ever.

== History ==
Though FIFA did not officially recognize the USVI team as affiliated until 1992, the Virgin Islands federation was founded in the 1970s by Trinidad native Robert T. Wills who helped build the base of the USVI Soccer Federation as it is known today. The team played its first official international match on March 21, 1998, in a victory against the British Virgin Islands. In May 2011, the USVI soccer federation chief, Frederick Hillaren, began ambitious changes in the team and appointed Keith Griffith, former coach and captain of the Barbados national team and former coach of Trinidad and Tobago powerhouse club team Joe Public, as technical director. Within two months of Griffith's appointment, the team shot up 51 places in the FIFA World Rankings. Soccer is the third most popular sport on the islands.

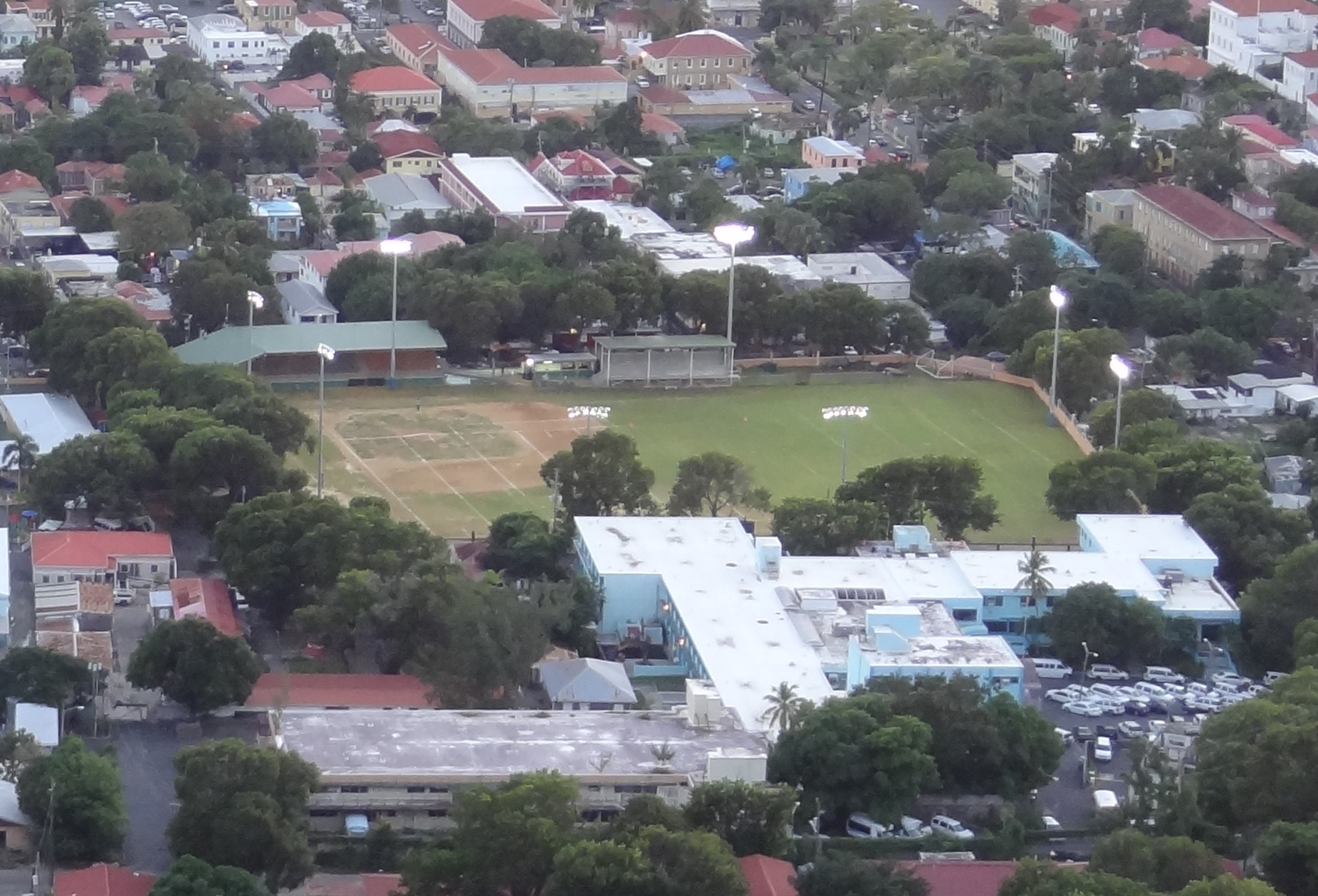
Lionel Roberts Park was used as the USVI home stadium before construction of the Bethlehem Soccer Stadium.

=== 2026 FIFA Series ===
The men's competition of the 2026 FIFA Series was split into nine different sections hosted across eight countries. In November 2025, FIFA announced that Puerto Rico would host one such section in Bayamón, in which Guam, the U.S. Virgin Islands and American Samoa would also compete. The Puerto Rican section of the tournament was held in a four-match format (semi-finals, third-place match and final) in late March 2026. The U.S. Virgin Islands finished second in the section after losing to hosts Puerto Rico in the final.

== Stadium ==
Previously the team did not have a national stadium and were forced to play their home matches at Lionel Roberts Park, a baseball stadium in Charlotte Amalie. For their 2014 FIFA World Cup qualification matches, the team needed to bring in a new grass surface and make other special arrangements. In the past, the team has played at Paul E. Joseph Stadium in St. Croix. However, in February 2012, it was announced that the stadium was condemned and will be demolished to make way for a new sports complex that will cost at least $50 million. The 50-acre (20 ha) complex will contain venues for tennis, volleyball, baseball, and aquatics. However, the plans did not include a new soccer stadium.

For the 2018 FIFA World Cup qualification, the team played at the Addelita Cancryn Junior High School Ground where they suffered a 4–0 loss to the Barbados national team.

In August 2019, the USVI Soccer Association officially opened the 1,200-seat Bethlehem Soccer Stadium in Christiansted after an almost four-year construction process of the new complex.

== Results and fixtures ==
The following is a list of match results in the last 12 months, as well as any future matches that have been scheduled.

Win Draw Loss Fixture

=== 2025 ===
November 14 Friendly	Grenada	4–1	U.S. Virgin Islands	St. George's, Grenada
	Muirhead 11'; Charles-Cook 27', 34'; Douglas 56'	Report	Liburd 71'	Stadium: Kirani James Athletic Stadium

=== 2026 ===
March 25 2026 FIFA Series	U.S. Virgin Islands	5–2	American Samoa	Bayamón, Puerto Rico
16:00 UTC−4	J. Ramos 7'; Penders 19', 20'; Liburd 53'; Robinson (red card) 79'; St. Louis 90+2' (pen.)	Report	Mitchell 80' (pen.), 82'	Stadium: Juan Ramón Loubriel Stadium; Referee: José Torres (Puerto Rico)

March 28 2026 FIFA Series	Puerto Rico	2–0	U.S. Virgin Islands	Bayamón, Puerto Rico
20:00 UTC−4	De León 19' (pen.); Shaffer 44' (o.g.)	Report		Stadium: Juan Ramón Loubriel Stadium; Referee: Randy Encarnación (Dominican Republic)

September 26 2026–27 CONCACAF Nations League C	Saint Martin	0–2	U.S. Virgin Islands	Upper Bethlehem, U.S. Virgin Islands
16:00		Report	Liburd 18', 83'	Stadium: Bethlehem Soccer Stadium; Referee: Amaury Majors (Bermuda)

September 29 2026–27 CONCACAF Nations League C	U.S. Virgin Islands	3–1	Bahamas	Upper Bethlehem, U.S. Virgin Islands
16:00	St. Louis 14'; Joseph 45+3'; Armour 62'	Report	Rahming 68'	Stadium: Bethlehem Soccer Stadium; Attendance: 332; Referee: Okeito Nicholson (Jamaica)

October 1 2026–27 CONCACAF Nations League C	U.S. Virgin Islands	0–5	Saint Martin	Upper Bethlehem, U.S. Virgin Islands
		Report		Stadium: Bethlehem Soccer Stadium

October 4 2026–27 CONCACAF Nations League C	Bahamas	v	U.S. Virgin Islands	Upper Bethlehem, U.S. Virgin Islands
		Report		Stadium: Bethlehem Soccer Stadium

== Coaching history ==
- (England) Paul Inurie (2000)
- (Romania) Glad Bugariu (2000–2002)
- (Dominican Republic) Francisco Williams Ramírez (2003–2004)
- (United States Virgin Islands) Carlton Freeman (2004–2008)
- (Canada) Craig Martin (2010)
- (Barbados) Keith Griffith (2011)
- (United States Virgin Islands) Terrence Jones (2011)
- (United States Virgin Islands) Leonard Appleton (2014)
- (Somalia) Ahmed Mohamed Ahmed (2015–2017)
- (Canada) Craig Martin (2017)
- (Brazil) Marcelo Serrano (2017–2019)
- (Brazil) Gilberto Damiano (2019–2024)
- (United States Virgin Islands) Terrence Jones (2024–)

=== Technical directors ===
- (Barbados) Keith Griffith (2011–2013)
- (Trinidad and Tobago) Kenadall Walkes (2013–)

== Players ==
=== Current squad ===
The following players have been named to the squad for 2026 FIFA Series against American Samoa and Puerto Rico on 25 and 28 March 2026.

Caps and goals updated on March 28, 2026, following the match against Puerto Rico.

No.	Pos.	Player	Date of birth (age)	Caps	Goals	Club
1	GK	Dylan Ramos	August 6, 2001 (age 25)	10	0	(Football Association of Thailand) Kamphaengphet FC
18	GK	Whelan Joseph	October 8, 2002 (age 24)	6	0	(Puerto Rican Football Federation) Ponce FC
	GK	Terrence Jones Jr.	December 20, 1991 (age 34)	1	0	(U.S. Virgin Islands Soccer Federation) LRVI
2	DF	Jett Blaschka	December 16, 1999 (age 26)	29	1	Unattached
11	DF	Joshua Ramos	April 25, 2000 (age 26)	21	1	(United States Soccer Federation) Tormenta
14	DF	Quinn Farrell	September 26, 2002 (age 24)	15	2	(United States Soccer Federation) LSU Eunice
	DF	Carmelo Rodríguez	December 19, 1992 (age 33)	6	1	(U.S. Virgin Islands Soccer Federation) Rovers
	DF	Alfred Harris	January 23, 1999 (age 27)	3	0	(U.S. Virgin Islands Soccer Federation) Rovers
	DF	Brad Robinson	August 30, 2004 (age 22)	2	0	(The Football Association) Leverstock Green
	DF	Ismail Nieves	March 6, 2005 (age 21)	1	0	(United States Soccer Federation) Loyola Marymount Lions
	DF	Quinn Scott	July 15, 2006 (age 20)	0	0	(United States Soccer Federation) Northwood Timberwolves
16	MF	Axel Bartsch	May 16, 2002 (age 24)	11	0	(U.S. Virgin Islands Soccer Federation) LRVI
	MF	Jair Whyte	June 4, 2004 (age 22)	6	0	(United States Soccer Federation) Merrimack Warriors
5	MF	Andrew Shaffer	March 9, 2004 (age 22)	5	0	(United States Soccer Federation) Bowling Green University
19	MF	Jannick Liburd	September 26, 2001 (age 25)	4	2	Unattached
17	MF	Aubin Atemazem	June 4, 1996 (age 30)	2	0	(U.S. Virgin Islands Soccer Federation) New Vibes
15	MF	Devien Bell	March 26, 2004 (age 22)	0	0	(Football Federation of Belize) Wagiya
10	FW	Jimson St. Louis	December 2, 2002 (age 23)	23	2	(United States Soccer Federation) Lionsbridge FC
9	FW	Rakeem Joseph	May 23, 2000 (age 26)	18	2	(Antigua and Barbuda Football Association) Empire
20	FW	Naqwan Henry	November 16, 2004 (age 22)	14	1	(Jamaica Football Federation) Treasure Beach
	FW	Matthew Roth	August 14, 2004 (age 22)	14	0	(United States Soccer Federation) Coastal Rush Pensacola
12	FW	Ramesses McGuiness	January 6, 2000 (age 26)	13	1	(United States Soccer Federation) Pittsburgh City United
21	FW	Gabriel Catone-Highfield	December 15, 2000 (age 25)	5	1	(United States Soccer Federation) Mount Olive Trojans
	FW	Toryn Penders	March 3, 2008 (age 18)	1	2	(United States Soccer Federation) Orlando City Academy

=== Recent call-ups ===
The following players have also been called up to the United States Virgin Islands squad within the last twelve months.

Pos.	Player	Date of birth (age)	Caps	Goals	Club	Latest call-up
MF	William Shaffer	July 5, 2001 (age 25)	11	0	(United States Virgin Islands) Helenites	v. Grenada, 14 November 2025
MF	Yannic Elizee	January 30, 2009 (age 17)	1	0	(United States Virgin Islands) Helenites	v. Grenada, 14 November 2025
^{INJ} Withdrew due to injury^{PRE} Preliminary squad / standby^{RET} Retired from the national team^{SUS} Serving suspension^{WD} Player withdrew from the squad due to non-injury issue.

== Records ==
As of October 12, 2024
Players in bold are still active with US Virgin Islands.

=== Most appearances ===
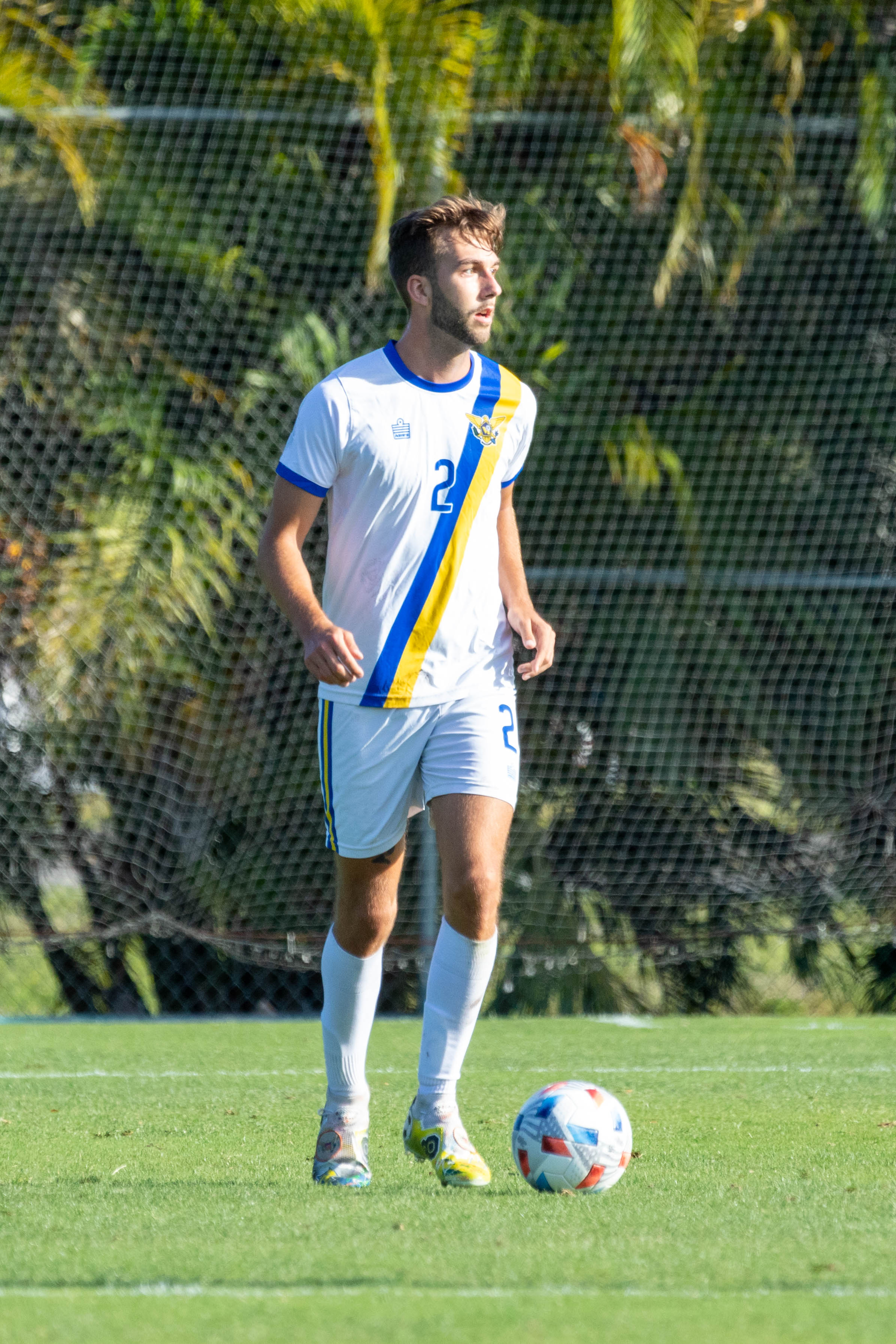
Jett Blaschka is US Virgin Islands' most capped player with 26 appearances.

Rank	Player	Caps	Goals	Career
1	**Jett Blaschka**	26	1	2018–present
2	**Jimson St. Louis**	22	1	2019–present
3	Dusty Good	21	0	2011–2021
3	**Kassall Greene**	21	0	2016–present
5	**Lionel Brown**	20	0	2019–present
6	MacDonald Taylor Jr.	19	1	2006–2022
7	**J.C. Mack**	18	3	2018–present
7	**Joshua Ramos**	18	0	2019–present
9	**Raejae Joseph**	17	1	2018–present
9	Dwayne Thomas	17	1	2002–2015

=== Top goalscorers ===
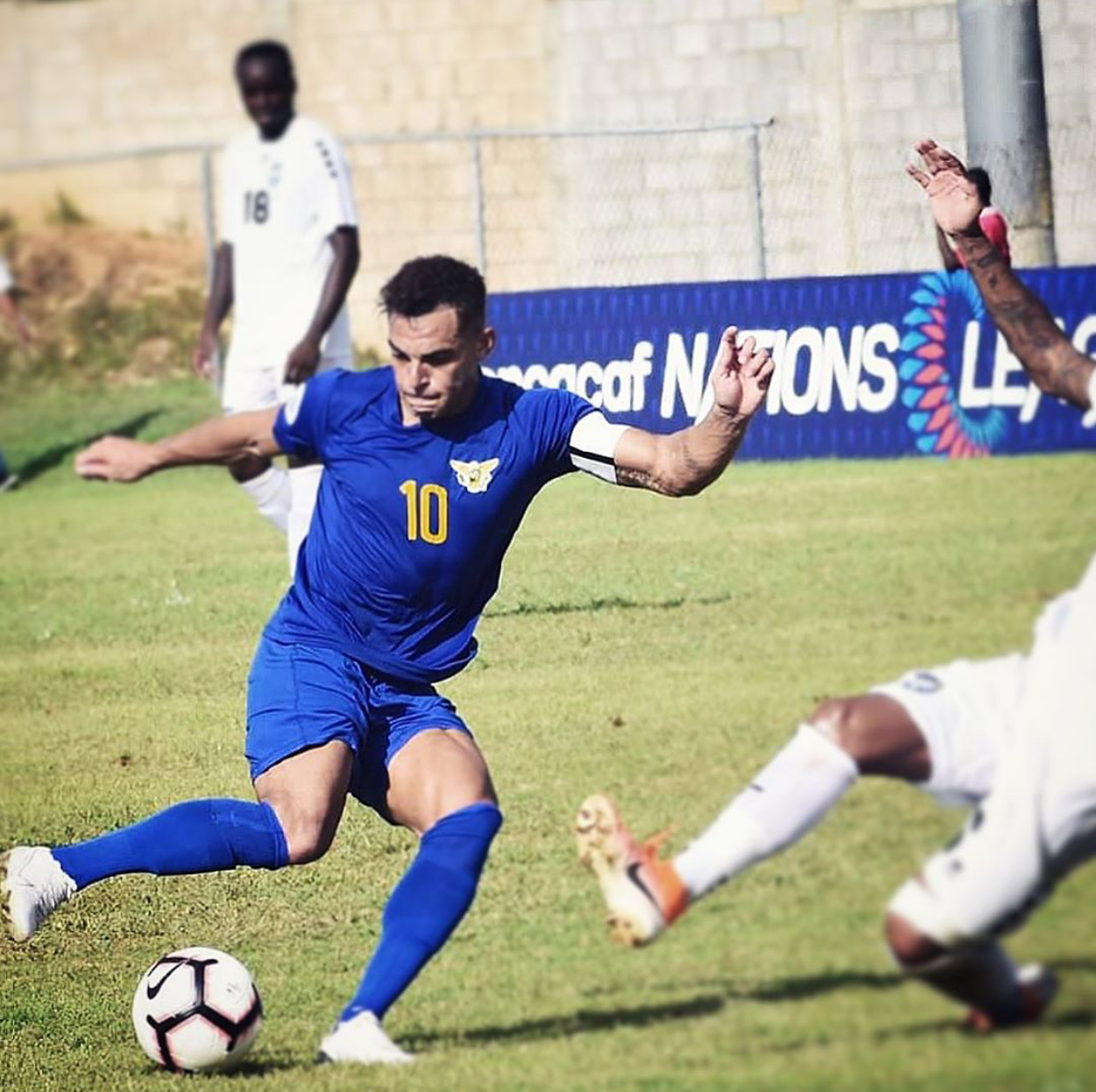
JC Mack is US Virgin Islands' joint-top scorer with 3 goals.

Rank	Player	Goals	Caps	Ratio	Career
1	**Jamie Browne**	3	12	0.25	2006–present
1	**J. C. Mack**	3	18	0.17	2018–present
3	Kevin Sheppard	2	2	1	2002
3	Reid Klopp	2	5	0.4	2011
3	Trevor Wrensford	2	6	0.33	2016–2019
3	Bryce Pierre	2	8	0.25	2004–2019
3	Aaron Dennis	2	9	0.22	2018–2019
3	**Quinn Farrell**	2	12	0.17	2021–present
3	**Rakeem Joseph**	2	16	0.13	2018–present

== Competitive record ==
=== FIFA World Cup ===
FIFA World Cup record									Qualification					
Year	Round	Position	Pld	W	D*	L	F	A	Pld	W	D	L	F	A
1930 to 1998	Not a FIFA member								Not a FIFA member					
(South Korea) (Japan) 2002	Did not qualify								2	0	0	2	1	14
(Germany) 2006	Did not qualify								2	0	0	2	0	11
(South Africa) 2010	Did not qualify								1	0	0	1	0	10
(Brazil) 2014	Did not qualify								8	2	0	6	6	41
(Russia) 2018	Did not qualify								2	1	0	1	1	4
(Qatar) 2022	Did not qualify								4	0	0	4	0	15
(Canada) (Mexico) (United States) 2026	Did not qualify								2	0	2	0	1	1
(Morocco) (Portugal) (Spain) 2030	To be determined								To be determined					
(Saudi Arabia) 2034	To be determined								To be determined					
Total	–	0/8	–	–	–	–	–	–	21	3	2	16	9	96

=== CONCACAF Gold Cup ===
CONCACAF Gold Cup record									Qualification record					
Year	Round	Position	Pld	W	D*	L	GF	GA	Pld	W	D	L	GF	GA
1991 to 1998	Did not enter								Did not enter					
(United States) 2000	Withdrew from qualification								Withdrew from qualification					
(United States) 2002	Did not qualify								3	0	0	3	2	37
(United States) (Mexico) 2003	Did not qualify								2	0	0	2	2	11
(United States) 2005	Did not qualify								3	0	1	2	1	22
(United States) 2007	Did not qualify								2	0	0	2	1	12
2009 to 2013	Did not enter								Did not enter					
(United States) (Canada) 2015	Did not qualify								2	0	0	2	1	3
(United States) 2017	Did not qualify								2	1	0	1	3	3
(United States) (Costa Rica) (Jamaica) 2019	Did not qualify								4	1	0	3	3	16
(United States) 2021	Did not qualify								2019–20 CONCACAF Nations League					
(United States) (Canada) 2023	Did not qualify								2022–23 CONCACAF Nations League					
(United States) (Canada) 2025	Did not qualify								2024–25 CONCACAF Nations League					
Total	0 Titles	0/18	0	0	0	0	0	0	16	2	1	13	13	104

=== CONCACAF Nations League ===
CONCACAF Nations League record
League phase											Final phase									
Season	League	Group	Pos.	Pld	W	D	L	GF	GA	P/R	Finals	Round	Pos.	Pld	W	D	L	GF	GA	Squad
2019–20	C	A	10th	6	1	0	5	3	11	Same position	(United States) 2021	Ineligible								
2022–23	C	A	8th	6	1	1	4	5	10	Same position	(United States) 2023	Ineligible								
2023–24	C	B	7th	4	0	1	3	5	11	Same position	(United States) 2024	Ineligible								
2024–25	C	A	8th	4	0	1	3	4	14	Same position	(United States) 2025	Ineligible								
2026–27	C	C	5th	4	3	0	1	8	8	Same position	2027 (Note: Since the 2026–27 CONCACAF Nations League, a final phase has been held for each league.)	Did not qualify								
Total				24	5	3	16	25	54	—	Total	—								

=== Caribbean Cup ===
Caribbean Cup record									Qualification record					
Year	Round	Position	Pld	W	D*	L	GF	GA	Pld	W	D*	L	GF	GA
1989 to 1997	Did not enter								Did not enter					
(Jamaica) (Trinidad and Tobago) 1998	Withdrew								Withdrew					
(Trinidad and Tobago) 1999	Did not qualify								2	0	2	0	2	2
(Trinidad and Tobago) 2001	Did not qualify								3	0	0	3	2	37
(Barbados) 2005	Did not qualify								3	0	1	2	1	22
(Trinidad and Tobago) 2007	Did not qualify								3	1	0	2	4	12
2008 to 2012	Did not enter								Did not enter					
(Jamaica) 2014	Did not qualify								2	0	0	2	1	3
(Martinique) 2017	Did not qualify								4	1	0	3	3	17
Total	0 Titles	0/19	0	0	0	0	0	0	17	2	3	12	13	93

== Head-to-head record ==
Team	Pld	W	D	L	GF	GA	GD	WPCT
American Samoa	1	1	0	0	5	2	+3	100.00
Anguilla	3	1	2	0	3	0	+3	33.33
Aruba	2	0	0	2	2	7	−5	0.00
Antigua and Barbuda	4	0	0	4	1	23	−22	0.00
Bahamas	5	2	2	1	10	10	0	40.00
Barbados	7	1	0	6	1	20	−19	14.29
Bermuda	1	0	0	1	0	6	−6	0.00
Bonaire	3	0	0	3	1	6	−5	0.00
British Virgin Islands	8	3	2	3	7	11	−4	37.50
Canada	1	0	0	1	0	8	−8	0.00
Cayman Islands	4	0	1	3	3	7	−4	0.00
Curaçao	4	0	0	4	1	21	−20	0.00
Dominica	1	0	0	1	0	5	−5	0.00
Dominican Republic	3	0	0	3	3	17	−14	0.00
El Salvador	1	0	0	1	0	7	−7	0.00
Grenada	4	0	0	4	2	17	−15	0.00
Guadeloupe	1	0	0	1	0	11	−11	0.00
Guyana	1	0	0	1	0	7	−7	0.00
Haiti	4	0	0	4	1	36	−35	0.00
Jamaica	1	0	0	1	1	11	−10	0.00
Montserrat	2	0	0	2	0	5	−5	0.00
Puerto Rico	1	0	0	1	0	2	−2	0.00
Saint Kitts and Nevis	2	0	0	2	0	11	−11	0.00
Saint Lucia	3	0	0	3	1	25	−24	0.00
Saint Martin	5	2	1	2	5	8	−3	40.00
Saint Vincent and the Grenadines	2	0	0	2	1	14	−13	0.00
Sint Maarten	3	1	1	1	4	4	0	33.33
Turks and Caicos Islands	4	1	2	1	6	6	0	25.00
Total	81	12	11	58	58	307	−249	14.81

Source: Results
