= Jannick Liburd =

American soccer player (born 2001)

Personal information
- Full name: Jannick Jørgensen Liburd
- Date of birth: September 26, 2001 (age 25)
- Place of birth: Houston, Texas, United States
- Height: 1.80 m (5 ft 11 in)
- Position: Left winger

Team information
- Current team: Rovers SC
- Number: 10

Youth career
- SønderjyskE

Senior career*
Years	Team	Apps	(Gls)
2020–2023	SønderjyskE	2	(0)
2025–	Rovers SC		

International career^{‡}
2024–	U.S. Virgin Islands	9	(4)
- * Club domestic league appearances and goals as of November 8, 2020 ‡ National team caps and goals as of 03:21, October 5, 2026 (UTC)

Jannick Jørgensen Liburd (born September 26, 2001) is an American professional soccer player who plays for Rovers SC and the U.S. Virgin Islands national team.

== Club career ==
Liburd made his Danish Superliga debut for SønderjyskE on July 8, 2020, in a game against Lyngby. He signed his first professional contract with the club on December 22, 2020. On 31 January 2023 Sønderjyske confirmed, that Liburd's contract had been terminated by mutual consent.

After the breakup with Sønderjyske, Liburd went to the USA, where he had a five-week trial with Minnesota United FC. However, it did not result in a contract. After a trip to Southeast Asia with his former teammate Mads Winther, Liburd returned to Denmark, where he began playing amateur football for a newly formed series team at B.93.

In the summer 2025, Liburd began playing for Rovers SC in Saint Croix.

== International career ==
Liburd was called up for U.S. Virgin Islands 2024–25 CONCACAF Nations League C match against Bahamas, where he made his debut in a 1–3 defeat.

=== International goals ===
Scores and results list the U.S. Virgin Islands' goal tally first.

List of international goals scored by Jannick Liburd
No.	Date	Venue	Opponent	Score	Result	Competition
1	November 14, 2025	Kirani James Athletic Stadium, St. George's, Grenada	Grenada	1–4	1–4	Friendly
2	March 25, 2026	Juan Ramón Loubriel Stadium, Bayamón, Puerto Rico	American Samoa	4–0	5–2	2026 FIFA Series
3	September 26, 2026	Bethlehem Soccer Stadium, Upper Bethlehem, U.S. Virgin Islands	Saint Martin	1–0	2–0	2026–27 CONCACAF Nations League C
4	September 26, 2026	Bethlehem Soccer Stadium, Upper Bethlehem, U.S. Virgin Islands	Saint Martin	2–0	2–0	2026–27 CONCACAF Nations League C
Last updated September 26, 2026

== Personal life ==
Liburd was born in the United States and is of Kittitian and Danish descent. He moved to Denmark at a young age. As a result, he also holds Danish citizenship.
