= Carlton Freeman =

United States Virgin Islands soccer coach

Personal information
- Place of birth: United States Virgin Islands

Managerial career
- Years: Team
- 2004–2008: United States Virgin Islands

Carlton Freeman is a United States Virgin Islands professional soccer coach.

== Career ==
From 2004 to 2008 he coached the United States Virgin Islands national football team.
