= Barbados 4–2 Grenada =

1994 anomalous football match

1994 Caribbean Cup qualification Group A
Barbados	Grenada
(Barbados)	(Grenada)
4	2
- After golden goal extra-time
- Date: January 27, 1994
- Venue: Barbados National Stadium, Saint Michael, Barbados

On January 27, 1994, the national football teams of Barbados and Grenada played against each other as part of the qualification round for the 1994 Caribbean Cup. Barbados won 4–2 in extra time. In the last minutes of regular time, both teams attempted to score own goals. The result has been described as "one of the strangest matches ever".

In the 1994 Caribbean Cup, the tournament organisers implemented a variant of the golden goal rule: the first goal scored in extra-time not only won the match, but was also worth two goals. Barbados needed to win the match by a margin of at least two goals to qualify for the final over Grenada. Barbados led the game 2–0 until Grenada scored in the 83rd minute, bringing the score to 2–1. Barbados then deliberately scored an own goal, tying the game at 2–2, to force extra-time so that they could take advantage of the golden goal rule to achieve their needed two-goal margin.

This resulted in an unusual situation where Grenada tried to score in both goals for the last three minutes of regular time. Either outcome (3–2 on points, or 2–3 via goal difference) would have advanced them to the finals, while Barbados had to defend both goals. Ultimately, Barbados was able to prevent Grenada from scoring, forcing extra-time. Barbados then scored the golden goal to win the match. The outcome of the match was criticised by Grenadian coach James Clarkson, who felt that his team had been unfairly prevented from advancing to the finals. Given the fact that the unusual tournament rules had not been broken, FIFA cleared Barbados of any wrongdoing.

== Background ==
The 1994 Caribbean Cup was the fifth edition of the Caribbean Cup and was played in Trinidad and Tobago. Qualification took place in various other locations around the Caribbean in early 1994. At the time, FIFA had been testing variations on tournament rules, and the tournament organisers had decided that any matches where the score was tied at the end of the normal 90 minutes would go to extra-time, which would feature a golden goal that, if scored, would be worth two goals. Barbados, Grenada, and Puerto Rico were drawn into Group 1, and on January 23 the round-robin tournament kicked off in Barbados, with the home team falling 0–1 to Puerto Rico. Two days later, Grenada defeated Puerto Rico 2–0 after a golden goal in extra-time. This put Grenada at the top of the group with three points and a +2 goal difference. Thus, the only way that Barbados could advance to the finals would be if they could beat Grenada by a margin of at least two goals. Before the match the standings were as follows:

Team	Pld	W	L	GF	GA	GD	Pts
Grenada	1	1	0	2	0	+2	3
Puerto Rico	2	1	1	1	2	−1	3
Barbados	1	0	1	0	1	−1	0

January 23, 1994

Barbados	0–1	Puerto Rico

Barbados National Stadium, Saint Michael

January 25, 1994

Grenada	2–0 (a.e.t.)	Puerto Rico

Grenada National Stadium, St. George's

== Match ==
The match was played at the Barbados National Stadium in Saint Michael. The match started off routinely and Barbados scored the first two goals, establishing the two-goal winning margin they required: in the 83rd minute, the game changed when Grenada scored a goal, which would take Grenada through to the finals unless Barbados could score again. Barbados attempted to score for the next few minutes, but as time ran out they switched to a different strategy: tying the game so they could attempt to achieve the two-goal margin with the golden goal in extra-time. In the 87th minute, they stopped attacking, with Barbados defender Terry Sealey and goalkeeper Horace Stoute passing the ball between each other before Sealey intentionally scored an own goal to tie the game at 2–2.

With just three minutes of normal time left, the Grenadian players caught on to the Barbadians' plan, and realised that they would advance in the tournament by scoring a goal in either net, since they would still qualify for the finals with a one-goal loss. This saw normal time finish in a highly unusual manner, with Grenada trying to score a goal in (and Barbados trying to defend) both nets. For the next three minutes, Barbadian players successfully defended both sides. As 90 minutes had expired with the score at 2–2, the game went on to extra time, where the winning "golden goal" would count double — thus, Barbados only had to score once to qualify for the 1994 Caribbean Cup. Trevor Thorne scored the winning goal for Barbados to advance to the next round with a score of 4–2. The final table was:

Team	Pld	W	L	GF	GA	GD	Pts
Barbados	2	1	1	4	3	+1	3
Grenada	2	1	1	4	4	0	3
Puerto Rico	2	1	1	1	2	−1	3

== Response ==
The game did not receive much attention, although reports were published in the United Kingdom in The Guardian and The Times. The story has since been told in the 2005 book Sports Law. The lack of immediate attention to the subject may have contributed to the game becoming something of an urban legend in the sport. In a press conference after the game, Grenadian manager James Clarkson said:

I feel cheated. The person who came up with these rules must be a candidate for a madhouse. ... The game should never be played with so many players running around the field confused. Our players did not even know which direction to attack: our goal or their goal. I have never seen this happen before. In football, you are supposed to score against the opponents to win, not for them.

The double golden goal rule was used five times over the course of qualification in 1994, and the Caribbean Cup organisers scrapped the rule after the tournament. Although the Barbadians' own-goal was highly unconventional, FIFA decided not to penalise the team because they were playing optimally under the circumstances.

== Post-match ==
Barbados went on to achieve third place in Group A of the 1994 Caribbean Cup after drawing against Guadeloupe and Dominica and losing to the home team Trinidad and Tobago, which went on to win the tournament.

Team	Pld	W	D	L	GF	GA	GD	Pts
Trinidad and Tobago	3	2	1	0	7	0	+7	7
Guadeloupe	3	1	2	0	7	2	+5	5
Barbados	3	0	2	1	3	5	−2	2
Dominica	3	0	1	2	1	11	−10	1

April 7, 1994

Barbados	1–1	Dominica

April 9, 1994

Trinidad and Tobago	2–0	Barbados

April 11, 1994

Guadeloupe	2–2	Barbados

== See also ==
- AS Adema 149–0 SO l'Emyrne, where SO l'Emyrne players deliberately scored 149 own goals in protest of refereeing decisions that had gone against them in the previous match.
- Disgrace of Gijón, where a 1982 World Cup game between West Germany and Austria was played out as a mutually agreeable 1–0 win to West Germany as this result ensured both teams qualified for the next round at the expense of Algeria.
- Thailand 3–2 Indonesia, where an Indonesian defender deliberately scored an own goal so his team did not have to face hosts Vietnam in the semi-finals of the 1998 Tiger Cup.
