= Dybbøl =

- Town
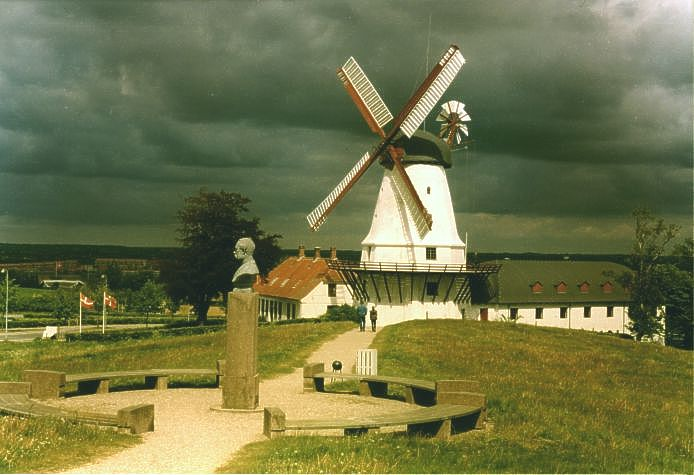
- Dybbøl with the historic Dybbøl Mill

- Location in Denmark Dybbøl (Region of Southern Denmark)
- Coordinates: 54°54′40″N 9°44′10″E
- Country: Denmark
- Region: Southern Denmark
- Municipality: Sønderborg

Area
  - Urban: 1.55 km^{2} (0.60 sq mi)

Population (2026)
  - Urban: 2,272
  - Urban density: 1,470/km^{2} (3,800/sq mi)
- Time zone: UTC+1 (CET)
  - Summer (DST): UTC+2 (CEST)
- Postal code: DK-6400 Sønderborg

Dybbøl is a small town with a population of 2,272 (1 January 2026) in the southeastern corner of South Jutland, Denmark. It is located around 6 km (3.7 mi) west of Sønderborg. It is mainly known for being the site of a famous last stand battle in 1864.

During the Second Schleswig War in 1864, the Danish Army withdrew from the traditional fortified defence line, the Dannevirke (after waters and marshes which supported its flanks froze solid in a hard winter), and marched for Dybbøl to find a more defensible position. Although much artillery was abandoned and the evacuation was executed through a snow-laden north gale in winter, the army arrived almost intact. It entrenched itself at the Dybbøl trenches, which became the scene of the siege and subsequent Battle of Dybbøl (7 April – 18 April 1864). This battle resulted in a Prussian-Austrian victory over Denmark.

In the following peace settlement, Denmark surrendered Schleswig. Following World War I, Denmark recovered the northern part of Schleswig as a result of the Schleswig Plebiscites as described in the Treaty of Versailles.

The Dybbøl Mill is considered a Danish national symbol.

== History ==
=== Etymology ===
Dybbøl has gone under a myriad of names throughout history, but it is theorized to have started as Dyttis Bol; after the founder Dytti, with Bol being an old Danish word for a single farm. The name would later evolve into its first written form, Duttebul, as recorded in a Schleswig tax registry from 1352. This name would be used for many years, until the T's started to get dropped, leading to the words eventual change to Dyppell in, for example, Johannes Mejer's atlas. The name would continue to evolve in this trend, eventually changing out Bol/Bel in favour of the newer word Bøl, to finally produce Dybbøl.

The town was also renamed to Düppel while under the rule of Prussia and later German Confederation and Empire, from 1864 to 1920.

=== Prewar ===
The town of Dybbøl started as part of a larger wave of expansionism during the Viking Age in Denmark in which hundreds of new land areas were settled in geographic Denmark as well as in its many settlements abroad such as in England. The first traces of human settlement in Dybbøl go back to around 4,500 BC, and the town itself is estimated to have been founded around 800 AD.

The prewar town was quite typical of the area. Its oldest building, from around 1100 AD, is a part of the local church structure, and the local peasants were serfs tied to Sandbjerg Castle. The ownership of the castle changed hands to the Reventlow family, which meant that the serfs in the area got to benefit from being some of the first serfs to buy their land and to become independent when Conrad Georg Reventlow started to sell his property after the lifting of the Stavnsbånd. Conrad Georg was one of the first lords to do so, which made Dybbøl home of some of the first self-bought free peasants in Denmark.

=== First Schleswig War ===
During the First Schleswig War, Dybbøl was used as a flanking position for the Danes in case of an attack from the south. The first battle of Dybbøl was fought on 5 July 1848, when Prussian troops were driven back from Dybbøl by the Danish troops who were garrisoned there. In April, there were regular skirmishes in and around the Dybbøl area. That led to the famous Dybbøl Mill being burnt down and so it was out of commission for 4 years.

=== Interwar ===
During later years between the two Schleswig Wars, namely in 1861, Danish engineers began construction of Dybbøl's trench system, which was finished in 1862. The system consisted of 10 redoubts in a 3 km long half-circle that stretched from Vemmingbund to the Als Sound. The redoubts were small earthen constructions with large powder stashes of concrete, as well as wooden blockhouses for soldiers.

=== Second Schleswig War ===
As part of the Second Schleswig War, Danish forces retreating from the Danevirke arrived in Dybbøl on the 5. February. The massive influx of soldiers and officers meant that the Dybbøl Mill became temporary military headquarters, a role that the owners of the mill (a married couple) were famously happy to fulfil, to the point of that they were honoured by veterans of the later battle at their wedding anniversary a century later.

On 15 March, the Prussian forces arrived at Dybbøl as part of their larger advance in Jutland. They began a month-long bombardment of the position, which could do with impunity as they had rifled cannons, unlike the Danes. During the bombardment, the Prussians worked to dig their own trenches towards the Danish ones as part of their assault preparations.

On 18 April at 10:00, the Prussians assaulted the Danish trench system after six hours of continual bombardment, with more than 8,000 shells falling on the Danish trenches.

The assault was successful, and the Danish forces had to fall back to Als.

=== After the war ===
After the Danish defeat in the Second Schleswig War, the resulting Treaty of Vienna meant that Dybbøl was now German territory as part of Prussia's conquest of the Duchy of Schleswig.

After the Unification of Germany, the German Empire erected a large monument, the Düppel Denkmal. It became a tourist attraction for Germans all the way until the First World War. The monument would be destroyed in 1945 by Danish rebels during the German occupation of Denmark during the Second World War. The mill in Dybbøl became a monument for the Danish-speaking part of Dybbøl, however, which was the majority at the time. Dybbøl went so far as to become the subject of several poems by the Danish poet Holger Drachmann.

The German Empire also rebuilt the trench system in Dybbøl by making it much bigger and more expansive. The additional reinforcements would never be used, however, as Denmark did not participate in World War I. The newer fortifications are still visible at the Dybbøl Museum.

In 1914, right before the advent of the First World War, the German Empire celebrated the anniversary of its victory at Als. The celebrations were held at the newly-constructed trench system at Dybbøl, where about 2,000 war veterans from both Germany and Austria-Hungary attended, along with the Emperor's brother, Prince Heinrich. That would be the last German celebration in Dybbøl, as the war broke out shortly afterward.

=== Reunification ===
After the end of World War I, populations in the former Duchy of Schleswig were given the opportunity through the Versailles Treaty to vote for which country they would rather be part of; Germany (then the Weimar Republic) or Denmark. The votes resulted in the borders as they are to this day.

The reunification resulted in celebration in Dybbøl, culminating in a visit by King Christian X on 11 July 1920. A massive party was held while the king visited in the 10th redoubt in the newer German trenches. This redoubt would later become known as Kongeskansen (The Royal Redoubt). Around 50.000 people were present for the celebrations, along with the King and the entire royal Danish family. The climax of the celebrations were the handing over of an old Dannebrog to the king by a veteran of the Battle of Dybbøl.

=== Today ===
Dybbøl continues to be a symbol of pride in Denmark, with it often being associated with a heroic last stand, similar to the Alamo in American conscience. Therefore, the entire town and most of the surrounding area have gradually become protected area, and it is illegal to disturb the trenches, mill and surrounding area.

The most notable institution in the town is the museum, which is a popular school trip destination.

== National Park status ==
The site is a national memorial and museum of the Battle of Dybbøl and was therefore included in the 'National Park Dybbøl Skanser,' inaugurated in 1924. This park is not included in the Danish National Park laws of 2007, but it can still use the name National Park. The area is today administered as a 'Historiecenter Dybbøl Banke' (Dybbøl Banke Museum and History Centre).

== Notable people ==
- Jens Jensen (1860 near Dybbøl – 1951) a Danish-American landscape architect
- Christian Petersen (1885 in Dybbøl – 1961) a Danish-born American sculptor and university teacher
- Mads Winther (born 2001), footballer
