= Colin Harewood =

Barbadian football manager

Personal information
- Place of birth: Barbados

Managerial career
- Years: Team
- Barbados U17
- 2015–2017: Barbados

Colin Harewood is a football coach from Barbados. He last coached the Barbados national football team.

== Coaching career ==
Manager of the Barbados Under-17s in 2014, Harewood was pleased with the team's results despite them finishing bottom of the 2015 CONCACAF U-17 Championship qualifying stages, instead blaming the incessant heat for his two losses and one draw.

Losing to Trinidad 2-0 and beating Martinique 2-1 ahead of the 2017 Windward Islands Tournament, Harewood was pleased with the 2-1 victory, stating that his charges improved that match.
