= Orlando Costa =

Portuguese football manager

Personal information
- Full name: Orlando Machado Costa
- Date of birth: 9 March 1977 (age 49)
- Place of birth: Portugal

Managerial career
- Years: Team
- 2001–2004: Moreirense U19 (assistant)
- 2005–2006: Académica OAF (assistant)
- 2006–2007: Persepolis (assistant)
- 2007–2008: Al-Tadamon (assistant)
- 2008–2009: Gil Vicente (assistant)
- 2009–2010: Vitória (assistant)
- 2010–2011: FC Seoul (assistant)
- 2011–2012: Dalian Shide (assistant)
- 2013–2014: Atlético CP (assistant)
- 2014–2015: AD Oliveirense
- 2015–2016: Tirsense
- 2019–2020: Merelinense
- 2022: Guinea-Bissau (assistant)
- 2022–2023: Barbados

Orlando Machado Costa (born 9 March 1977) is a Portuguese football manager. Besides Portugal, he has managed in Kuwait, Iran, South Korea, China, Guinea-Bissau, and Barbados.

== Career ==
In 2023, Costa was appointed manager of Barbados.
