= Glad Bugariu =

Romanian football manager

Glad Tudor Bugariu
Personal information
- Full name: Glad Tudor Bugariu
- Date of birth: 29 September 1976 (age 50)
- Place of birth: Bucharest, Romania

Team information
- Current team: Mount Olive Trojans

Managerial career
- Years: Team
- 1999–2000: Meredith College
- 2000–2002: U.S. Virgin Islands
- 2002–2004: NM Northern Football Club (Technical Director)
- 2004–2005: Grenada (Assistant Manager)
- 2005–2008: Belmont Abbey College
- 2008–2012: South Carolina State Bulldogs
- 2019–2020: Football Association of Moldova (U15)
- 2021–2022: Football Federation Samoa (Scout)
- 2012–2022: University of Texas Rio Grande Valley
- 2022–2023: Wake FC

Glad Tudor Bugariu (born 29 September 1976) is a Romanian football manager who has coached the U.S. Virgin Islands, Grenada, the Football Association of Moldova and various teams in the United States top division, the NCAA. Currently he is the head women's coach with the Mount Olive Trojans in the NCAA D2, having left his position as the First Team Head Coach and Director of Women's Soccer with Wake FC which competes in the USL W-league in the United States in January. Over the course of his career, Bugariu has worked with the national teams of four countries in various competitions such as the men's and women's FIFA World Cup qualifiers, Under 19 Women's Championships qualifiers, the men's and women's Gold Cup, Windward Islands Football Championship and the Under 20 World Championship qualifiers. He holds both an UEFA "A" License and a CONCACAF (USA) "A" License.

== Early life ==
Tudor Bugariu was born in Bucharest, Romania on 29 September 1976. His family ran away from the communist country in 1987 and settled in the United States. He played collegiate football at Brevard College in North Carolina, followed by a short stint with Romanian 4th Division Club Soimii Sibiu.

== Professional coaching career ==
=== Meredith College ===
After beginning his coaching career by working with local youth sides in the Raleigh, North Carolina area, he got his first break as the head coach of the Meredith College women's team, working with the side for one season with little success.

=== U.S. Virgin Islands ===
In 2000, he moved to the U.S. Virgin Islands and was the technical director for two years in charge of every aspect regarding to football in the federation. Bugariu was responsible for the development of the game in the country, creating programs that resulted in a 120% rise in soccer participation, in addition to creating national teams at every level. International headlines were made with the formation of a women's program at both senior and Under 19 levels for the first in the history of the country. Both teams had significant success, with the senior women's national team reaching the second round of World Cup qualifying in the CONCACAF region. Additionally, he was in charge of all national teams concentrating on the youth programs. Using mostly players under the age of 20 for all senior national team games, Mr. Bugariu also achieved the first ever rise in the men's FIFA Rankings for the U.S. Virgin Islands.

=== New Mexico Northern FC ===
Bugariu served as Director of Coaching and Player Development for Northern FC, a club in the state of New Mexico with over 1000 players.

Bugariu also led the club's U14's to the semi-finals of the state championships.

During his time in New Mexico, Bugariu also worked with the United States Olympic Development Program, coaching the Under 16 New Mexico State Women's Team while also serving as the director of goalkeeping.

=== Grenada ===
Bugariu was appointed assistant manager of the Grenada national team working with Mike Adams (football coach) during the qualifying campaigns for both the 2006 World Cup and the 2005 Gold Cup. During his time in Grenada, the national team reached the second round of World Cup qualifying narrowly losing to the United States, in addition to advancing from the "Group of Death" during Gold Cup qualifying in Trinidad and Tobago. These achievements resulted in a 13-place rise in the FIFA rankings, the most significant advancement in the history of the country.

From a developmental standpoint, Mr. Bugariu created the Grenada National Goalkeeper Development Program and the goalkeeper coach education curriculum

=== Belmont Abbey College ===
Upon his return to the United States he took over the women's football program at Belmont Abbey College (NCAA II) and his contribution was significant, winning two league titles, two league tournament cups, and a cup runner up spot in just three years.

=== South Carolina State Bulldogs ===
Named women's football head coach at South Carolina State University in April 2008, the team competes at the highest level, the first division (NCAA I) of the United States university league and his tenure was nothing short of a miracle. After only one year in charge, Mr. Bugariu was able to place 3rd in their league in 2009, the highest finish in history, while also winning more games than the club had in the previous 4 seasons combined. This was followed up by a historical 2010 campaign where the team captured their league divisional title and coach Bugariu was named Coach of the Year. Furthermore, he was able to qualify for at least the semi-finals of the league cup each season and holds the record for most wins by any coach at the club.

=== Carolina Cobras ===
In 2011 Bugariu was loaned by South Carolina State University for 5 months to the Carolina Cobras of the W-league, serving as the inaugural coach of the new professional women's football franchise. Although he was able to lead them to their first ever win, the purpose of the loan was to develop the playing and coaching staff and creating a competitive team for the future. He returned to his position at South Carolina State University in August 2011.

=== Texas–Rio Grande Valley Vaqueros ===
On 26 April 2013, Glad Bugariu was named as the first coach of the new team at the University of Texas – Rio Grande Valley that made its debut in August 2014. He is responsible for the development of a brand new NCAA division I program competing in the Western Athletic Conference (WAC). He has managed to qualify for league playoffs with the University of Rio Grande Valley women's soccer team every year of existence and has finished in the top three of league in both 2017 and 2018. He resigned his position on March 2, 2022 to take over the First Team head coaching duties at Wake FC (USL W-league)

=== Moldova Football Federation ===
In January 2019 Bugariu was named head coach of the Moldova Under 15 Women's National Team, which he combined with his club duties at UTRGV. He is not only the first foreign coach in the history of women's football in the country, but made an immediate impact. The Moldova Under 15 women's national team won the UEFA / AFC Development Tournament which took place in Singapore in March 2019. In the first game of the tournament they defeated Cambodia 5–0, which also represents the first time the country has won a game in that age group. As his contract ended in December 2020 he has decided he will not continue and focus on his USA club.

=== Football Federation Samoa ===
Between February 2021 and January 2022 he has served as a Territorial Scout in the United States for the Samoan Football Federation working in conjunction with the national coaching staff to identity potential national team players within the Samoan diaspora in the United States of America.

=== Wake Futbol Club ===
Beginning on April 1, 2022 Bugariu became the First Team head coach and the director of women's soccer with the club. He is responsible for the development of a brand new USL W-league competing in the South Atlantic Division and the overall vision and guidance for the club's already established youth academy. With only a few weeks to set up a roster, the team was able capture third place in the league, with 55% winning percentage. Players from the squad received significant honors, with one player named to the W-league Team of the Year and another being called up to the Under 23 England National Team. He resigned from his position January 2023.

=== Mount Olive Trojans ===
Beginning on April 1, 2023 Bugariu became the Head Women's Coach competing in the Conference Carolinas of the NCAA Division 2.

== Coaching achievements ==
2022: South Atlantic Division 3rd Place / (Wake Futbol Club)

2019: UEFA / AFC Under 15 Development Tournament Champion / (Moldova)

2019: Western Athletic Conference Semi – Finals of League Playoffs / (UTRGV)

2018: Western Athletic Conference 2nd Place / (UTRGV)

2018: Western Athletic Conference Semi – Finals of League Playoffs / (UTRGV)

2017: Western Athletic Conference 3rd Place / (UTRGV)

2010: Great West Conference Coach of the Year / (South Carolina State University)

2010: Great West Conference Champion / (South Carolina State University)

2009: Great West Conference 2nd Place / (South Carolina State University)

2009: Best record in school history / (South Carolina State University)

2007: Conference Carolina League Champion / (Belmont Abbey College)

2007: Conference Carolina Tournament Runner Up / (Belmont Abbey College)

2006: Conference Carolina Tournament Champion / (Belmont Abbey College)

2005: Conference Carolina League and Tournament Champion (Belmont Abbey College)

2004: Increase of 13 places in FIFA Rankings (Grenada)

2004: Advanced to second round of Gold Cup Qualifiers. (Grenada)

2004: Advanced to second round of World Cup Qualifiers. (Grenada)

2002: Achieved first time ever increase in FIFA World Rankings. (Virgin Islands)

2002: Advanced to second round of Women's World Cup Qualifying. (Virgin Islands)

2001: Created Women's National Team Program. (Virgin Islands)

2001: Bronze Metal Milo International Cup (Virgin Islands Under 18 Men's national team)

2001: Champion 2001 Leeward Islands Under 18 Football Championship (Virgin Islands)

2001: Qualified Senior National Team for 2001 Copa Caribe (Virgin Islands)
