= Gilberto Damiano =

Brazilian football manager

Gilberto “Giba” Damiano
Personal information
- Full name: Gilberto Damiano Maciel, Jr.
- Date of birth: December 1976 (age 49)
- Place of birth: Brazil

Team information
- Current team: Technical Director - St Kitts and Nevis Football Association

Managerial career
- Years: Team
- November 2019 to March 2024: US Virgin Islands U23
- 2019–2024: US Virgin Islands

Gilberto “Giba” Damiano Maciel, Jr. is a Brazilian football manager who was in charge of the US Virgin Islands team from November 2019 to March 2024.

In January 2024 Giba Damiano was hired as Assistant Coach for the NWSL team - Houston Dash. Because of family Priorities, Giba left the job in September 2024.

He moved his coaching education journey to Scotland, 2018 to 2022 where he got his UEFA Pro license.

== Coaching career ==
=== Cardiff City ===
From 2012 to 2014, Damiano held a coaching role at Cardiff City.

=== US Virgin Islands ===
Giba was hired in 2018 as assistant coach of the U.S. Virgin Islands men's senior national team ahead of World Cup qualifiers, the CONCACAF Gold Cup, and the CONCACAF Nations League.

In October 2019, Damiano was appointed manager of the US Virgin Islands and their under-23 side. In 2019 he was appointed as the U.S. Virgin Islands head coach and the general manager of the national team.

=== Houston Dash ===
Giba was appointed Assistant Coach for the NWSL team Houston Dash in January 2024.

=== St Kitts And Nevis Football Association ===
Appointed Technical Director in August 2025. Giba has signed a 2 years contract - August 2025 to September 2027.
