= Eyre Sealy =

Barbadian professional football manager

Personal information
- Place of birth: Barbados

Managerial career
- Years: Team
- 1998: Barbados
- 2007–2008: Barbados
- União Agrícola Barbarense

Eyre Sealy is a Barbadian professional football manager.

== Career ==
In 1998 and since January 2007 until June 2008 he coached the Barbados national football team.
