= Craig Martin (Canadian soccer) =

Canadian soccer player

Personal information
- Full name: Craig Martin
- Date of birth: July 15, 1957 (age 69)
- Place of birth: Niagara Falls, Ontario, Canada

College career
Years	Team	Apps	(Gls)
- McMaster Marauders

Senior career*
Years	Team	Apps	(Gls)
1983	Hamilton Steelers		
1990	Kitchener Spirit	2	(0)

International career
1983-1984	Canada Olympic	8	(1)
1983-1984	Canada	6	(0)

Managerial career
- 2010: US Virgin Islands
- 2017–2018: US Virgin Islands
- * Club domestic league appearances and goals

Craig Martin (born July 15, 1957) is a former Canadian national soccer team player.

Born in Niagara Falls, Ontario, Martin made 6 'A' international appearances for Canada, 4 in 1983 and 2 more in 1984. A defender, he was also a member of the team that competed at the 1984 Summer Olympics in Los Angeles, California.

Martin played collegiately for McMaster University. He then played for the Canadian Professional Soccer League's Hamilton Steelers.

In 1995, Martin was inducted into the Niagara Falls Sports Hall of Fame.

Martin was the coach of the United States Virgin Islands national soccer team.
