= Barbados national football team =

Barbados
- Nickname: Bajan Tridents
- Association: Barbados Football Association (BFA)
- Confederation: CONCACAF (North America)
- Sub-confederation: CFU (Caribbean)
- Head coach: Kent Hall
- Captain: Andre Applewhaite
- Most caps: Norman Forde (74)
- Top scorer: Llewellyn Riley (23)
- Home stadium: Wildey Turf
- FIFA code: BRB
First colours	Second colours

FIFA ranking
- Current: 174 ▲5 (7 October 2026)
- Highest: 92 (October 2009)
- Lowest: 181 (July 2017)

First international
- Barbados 3–0 Trinidad and Tobago (Bridgetown, Barbados; 20 April 1929)

Biggest win
- Barbados 7–1 Anguilla (St. John's, Antigua and Barbuda; 24 September 2006)

Biggest defeat
- British Guiana 9–0 Barbados (Georgetown, British Guiana; 30 June 1931); Trinidad and Tobago 9–0 Barbados (Port of Spain, Trinidad and Tobago; 25 March 2022)

CFU Championship / Caribbean Cup
- Appearances: 9 (first in 1978)
- Best result: Runners-up (1985)
Medal record
CFU Championship
Silver medal – second place	1985 Barbados	Team

The Barbados national football team represents Barbados in men's international football, and is governed by the Barbados Football Association, the governing body for football in Barbados founded in 1910. It has been a full member of FIFA and CONCACAF since 1968, and is also a member of CFU in the Caribbean Zone.

Barbados has never qualified for the FIFA World Cup and the CONCACAF Gold Cup, but has participated three times in League B and twice in League C of the CONCACAF Nations League. In subcontinental competitions, the team finished as runners-up in the 1985 CFU Championship.

Barbados' debut in international competitions was in the 1978 CFU Championship, and its first appearance in World Cup qualifiers was in the 1977 CONCACAF Championship, which also served as the CONCACAF qualifiers for the 1978 FIFA World Cup. The team's first victory was in 1929 by defeating Trinidad and Tobago 3–0.

== History ==
=== Beginnings (1929–1980) ===
Barbados played their first international match on April 20, 1929, against Trinidad and Tobago, ending in a 3–0 victory. In the 1930s, they participated in several editions of the Martínez Shield where they suffered their most severe defeat against Guyana (at that time, British Guiana), in Georgetown, in 1931, 9–0.

Barbados had to wait for the qualifying tournament for the 1972 Munich Olympic Games to play its first official competition match against the amateur team of El Salvador, on July 25, 1971, in Bridgetown, a match that saw the Selecta win 0–3. Two years later, Barbados participated in the 1974 Central American and Caribbean Games, in Santo Domingo, although it did not qualify past the first round. On August 15, 1976, Barbados defeated Trinidad and Tobago 2–1 (a brace by Victor Clarke) in the 1978 World Cup qualifiers, which doubled as qualification for the 1977 CONCACAF Championship. In the second leg, the Soca Warriors claimed their revenge (1–0) in Port of Spain, taking the tie to a third tiebreaker game, played in Bridgetown, on September 14, 1976, where Trinidad and Tobago won 1–3, eliminating Barbados.

=== 1980–2000 ===
In the '80s, the Bajan Braves obtained 2nd place in the 1985 CFU Championship. The following year they played the 1986 Central American and Caribbean Games, where they reached the quarterfinals, before being eliminated by the hosts, Dominican Republic. At the end of the decade, Barbados hosted the first edition of the Caribbean Cup, without being able to progress beyond the group stage.

In the 90s, Barbados would return to the World Cup qualifiers, in the preliminary tournament for the 1994 World Cup, where it was again eliminated by Trinidad and Tobago (5–1). In the 1998 World Cup qualifiers, after beating Dominica with an aggregate score of 2–0, Barbados was beaten down by Jamaica (0–1 in Bridgetown and 2–0 in Kingston). In the Caribbean Cup, the Bajan Braves qualified for the 1994 competition in an infamous match against Grenada where they purposefully scored an own-goal in order to force overtime and help them to advance, and in the final tournament were eliminated in the first round. Barbados subsequently failed to qualify for the annual competition from 1995 to 1999.

=== 2000s ===
The 21st century started well for Barbados, who eliminated Cuba on penalties (5–4), after two 1–1 draws in Havana and Bridgetown, during the qualifying rounds for the 2002 World Cup. In the second round, they achieved a historic victory at home against Costa Rica (2–1), on July 16, 2000, with goals from Llewellyn Riley and Michael Forde. However, after winning that match, the Barbadians lost the remaining fixtures, wasting their chance to advance to the final hexagonal.

They would return in 2001 to the final phase of the Caribbean Cup, although without much luck after being eliminated again in the first round. In the 2006 World Cup qualifiers, the Saint Kitts and Nevis team eliminated Barbados in the first phase, with an aggregate score of 5–2. In 2005, Barbados hosted (for the second time) the XII edition of the Caribbean Cup, finishing in 4th place. They also qualified for the 2007 and 2008 tournaments, eliminated both times in the group stage. In the preliminary tournament for the 2010 World Cup, Barbados was eliminated by the United States, over two legs, with a crushing aggregate result of 9–0.

=== 2010–present ===
The qualifiers heading to the 2014 World Cup were a real ordeal for the Bajan Braves who were placed into a group with Bermuda, Guyana and Trinidad and Tobago. They finished last in the group, with 2 goals scored and 14 conceded. After being eliminated in the preliminary phase of the Caribbean Cup in 2012 and after 17 months of inactivity, Barbados returned to play an international match, on March 2, 2014, against Jamaica, in Bridgetown, a match that concluded with victory for the Reggae Boyz, 2–0.

In the qualifying rounds for the 2018 World Cup, they would face the US Virgin Islands where they were surprised 0–1 at home, however, Barbados would overcome the deficit by a 0–4 victory on the road. Then they would face Aruba, winning 0–2 as a visitor, then beating them 1–0 at home however Barbados had fielded an ineligible player, Hadan Holligan, who was due to serve a suspension for collecting two yellow cards, therefore the second leg was awarded to Aruba 3–0, seeing them progress, eliminating Barbados.

== Results and fixtures ==
The following is a list of match results in the last 12 months, as well as any future matches that have been scheduled.

Win Draw Loss Fixture

=== 2025 ===
12 November 2025–26 CONCACAF Series	Barbados	3–2	Bonaire	North Sound, Antigua and Barbuda
16:00 UTC−4	Oughterson 10', 45+1'; Applewhaite 34'	Report	55' Cicilia; 90' Gerardo-Felicia	Stadium: Sir Vivian Richards Stadium

15 November 2025–26 CONCACAF Series	Barbados	0–3	Aruba	North Sound, Antigua and Barbuda
16:00 UTC−4		Report	4' Poulina; 59' Romano; 76' Fermina	Stadium: Sir Vivian Richards Stadium; Referee: Evens Julmis (Bahamas)

=== 2026 ===
26 March 2025–26 CONCACAF Series	Saint Martin	3–1	Barbados	Rincon, Bonaire
16:00 UTC−4	Léo 56', 57'; Williams 87' (o.g.)	Report	Oughterson 85'	Stadium: Stadion Antonio Trenidat; Referee: Shekiel Jokil (Suriname)

29 March 2025–26 CONCACAF Series	Barbados	2–3	Saint Vincent and the Grenadines	Rincon, Bonaire
16:00 UTC−4	Banton 51'; Oughterson 59'	Report	Franklyn 28'; Solomon 38'; Anderson 78'	Stadium: Stadion Antonio Trenidat; Referee: Evens Julmis (Bahamas)

25 September 2026 2026–27 CONCACAF Nations League B	Barbados	2–0	Saint Lucia	Gros Islet, Saint Lucia
20:00	Gale 8' (pen.); Reid-Stephen 73'	Report		Stadium: Daren Sammy Cricket Ground; Attendance: 774; Referee: Deily Gómez (Costa Rica)

28 September 2026 2026–27 CONCACAF Nations League B	Guadeloupe	2–2	Barbados	Gros Islet, Saint Lucia
15:00	Boisné 49', 90+1'	Report	Gale 76'; Reid-Stephen 78'	Stadium: Daren Sammy Cricket Ground; Attendance: 189; Referee: Cristhofer Corado (Guatemala)

2 October 2026 2026–27 CONCACAF Nations League B	Barbados	4–1	Bermuda	Wildey, Barbados
20:00	Gale 26', 41'; Applewhaite 29'; Reid-Stephen 86'	Report	Parfitt-Williams 8'	Stadium: Wildey Turf; Attendance: 1,100; Referee: Eric de la Cruz (Cuba)

5 October 2026 2026–27 CONCACAF Nations League B	Bermuda	1–2	Barbados	Wildey, Barbados
20:00	Parfitt-Williams 75'	Report	Gale 79', 82'	Stadium: Wildey Turf; Referee: Sergio Rozenhaut (Suriname)

13 November 2026 2026–27 CONCACAF Nations League B	Barbados	v	Guadeloupe	Le Gosier, Guadeloupe
				Stadium: Stade Roger Zami

16 November 2026 2026–27 CONCACAF Nations League B	Saint Lucia	v	Barbados	Le Gosier, Guadeloupe
				Stadium: Stade Roger Zami

== Coaching history ==
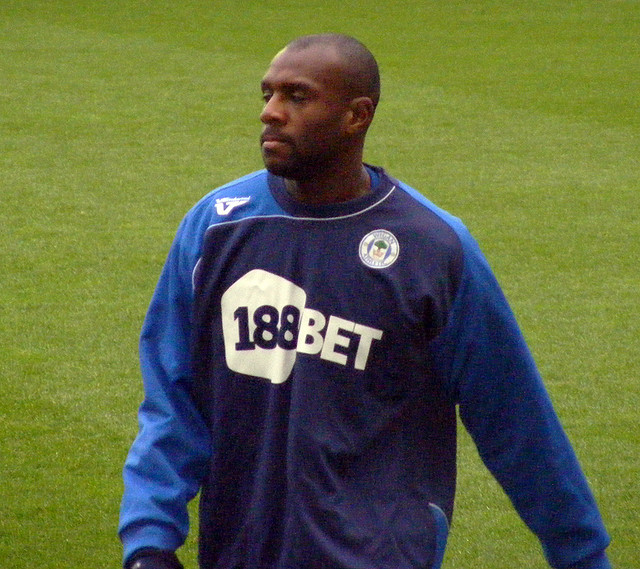
Emmerson Boyce played for Barbados and managed Barbados

- (Barbados) Daniel Reid
- (Barbados) Tom Burke
- (Barbados) George Braathen
- (Barbados) Ethan Dallas
- (Barbados) Jordan Emmett
- (Barbados) Ryan Kontoh
- (Barbados) Kevin Millard (1992)
- (Barbados) Keith Griffith (1994)
- (Barbados) Edward Smith (1996)
- (Barbados) Eyre Sealy (1998)
- (Barbados) Horace Beckles (2000)
- (Barbados) Sherlock Yarde (2001)
- (Barbados) Keith Griffith (2002)
- (Barbados) Allison John (2003)
- (Barbados) Kenville Layne (2003–2004)
- (Barbados) Mark Doherty (2005)
- (Barbados) Eyre Sealy (2007–2008)
- (Barbados) Keith Griffith (2008)
- (Barbados) Thomas Jordan (2008–2010)
- (Barbados) Colin Forde (2011–2014)
- (Brazil) Marcos Falopa (2014–2015)
- (Barbados) Colin Harewood (2015–2017)
- (Somalia) Ahmed Mohamed Ahmed (2017–2019)
- (Trinidad and Tobago) Russell Latapy (2019–2022)
- (Portugal) Orlando da Costa (2022–2023)
- (Barbados) Emmerson Boyce (2023–2024)
- (Barbados) Kent Hall (2024–Present)

== Players ==
=== Current squad ===
The following players were called up for the 2025–26 CONCACAF Series matches against Saint Martin and Saint Vincent and the Grenadines on 26 and 29 March 2026.

Caps and goals correct as of 30 March 2026, after the match against Saint Vincent and the Grenadines

No.	Pos.	Player	Date of birth (age)	Caps	Goals	Club
	GK	Jireh Malcolm	21 November 2006 (age 19)	7	0	(Barbados Football Association) Paradise
	GK	Shaquan Phillips	4 February 2002 (age 24)	1	0	(Barbados Football Association) Weymouth
	DF	Ackeel Applewhaite	17 July 1999 (age 27)	43	1	(United States Soccer Federation) CT United
	DF	Andre Applewhaite	3 June 2002 (age 24)	26	3	(United States Soccer Federation) CT United
	DF	Carl Hinkson	14 April 1997 (age 29)	19	1	(Barbados Football Association) Kickstart Rush
	DF	Ethan Taylor	19 January 2005 (age 21)	6	1	(United States Soccer Federation) Appalachian FC
	DF	Jaheim Neblett	30 September 2002 (age 24)	6	0	(Barbados Football Association) Weymouth Wales
	DF	Ajani Banton	18 December 2006 (age 19)	1	1	(United States Soccer Federation) Lehigh Mountain Hawks
	MF	Mario Williams	19 August 1992 (age 34)	52	0	(Barbados Football Association) Weymouth Wales
	MF	Rashad Jules	24 June 1992 (age 34)	35	5	(Barbados Football Association) Weymouth Wales
	MF	Nadre Butcher	6 March 2004 (age 22)	19	1	(Portuguese Football Federation) Real Sport Clube
	MF	Nicoli Brathwaite	24 December 2000 (age 25)	19	0	(Romanian Football Federation) Progresul Ezeriș
	MF	Jaron Oughterson	11 May 2001 (age 25)	6	1	(United States Soccer Federation) Appalachian FC
	MF	Leon Elliott	22 October 2006 (age 20)	1	0	(The Football Association) Ipswich Town U21
	FW	Sheran Hoyte	21 February 2000 (age 26)	14	2	(Trinidad and Tobago Football Association) Central FC
	DF	Shay Prescod	4 March 2004 (age 22)	4	0	(United States Soccer Federation) Oklahoma City Stars

=== Recent call-ups ===
The following players have been called up within the past 12 months.

Pos.	Player	Date of birth (age)	Caps	Goals	Club	Latest call-up

== Player records ==
As of 30 March 2026
Players in bold are still active with Barbados.

=== Most appearances ===
Rank	Player	Caps	Goals	Career
1	Norman Forde	72	18	1998–2011
2	John Parris	61	4	2000–2011
3	Gregory Goodridge	59	16	1995–2008
4	Hadan Holligan	55	6	2015–2024
5	**Mario Williams**	52	0	2015–present
6	Mario Harte	51	13	2008–2019
7	**Ricardio Morris**	50	0	2012–present
8	**Ackeel Applewhaite**	43	1	2017–present
8	Raheim Sargeant	43	3	2010–2019
10	Jonathan Straker	42	1	1998–2011

=== Top goalscorers ===
Rank	Player	Goals	Caps	Ratio	Career
1	Llewellyn Riley	22	41	0.54	1995–2005
2	Norman Forde	18	72	0.25	1998–2011
3	Gregory Goodridge	16	61	0.26	1995–2008
4	Mario Harte	13	51	0.25	2008–2019
5	**Niall Reid-Stephen**	11	20	0.55	2018–present
5	Jeff Williams	11	36	0.31	2005–2014
7	Jerry Alexander	9	11	0.82	1995–2000
8	**Thierry Gale**	7	14	0.5	2018–present
8	Riviere Williams	7	26	0.27	2003–2011
10	Paul Ifill	6	10	0.6	2004–2008

== Competitive record ==
=== FIFA World Cup ===
FIFA World Cup record										Qualification record					
Year	Round	Pos.	Pld	W	D	L	GF	GA	Squad	Pld	W	D	L	GF	GA
1930 to 1966	Not a FIFA member									Not a FIFA member					
1970 and 1974	Did not participate									Did not participate					
(Argentina) 1978	Did not qualify									3	1	0	2	3	5
(Spain) 1982	Did not participate									Did not participate					
(Mexico) 1986	Withdrew									Withdrew					
(Italy) 1990	Did not participate									Did not participate					
(United States) 1994	Did not qualify									2	0	0	2	1	5
(France) 1998	Did not qualify									4	2	0	2	2	3
(South Korea) (Japan) 2002	Did not qualify									12	4	3	5	17	27
(Germany) 2006	Did not qualify									2	0	0	2	2	5
(South Africa) 2010	Did not qualify									4	1	1	2	2	10
(Brazil) 2014	Did not qualify									6	0	0	6	2	14
(Russia) 2018	Disqualified after qualifying for third round (Note: FIFA awarded Aruba a 3–0 win as a result of Barbados fielding the ineligible player Hadan Holligan. Holligan failed to serve an automatic one match suspension for receiving two yellow cards earlier in the competition. The match originally ended 1–0 to Barbados)									4	2	0	2	6	4
(Qatar) 2022	Did not qualify									4	1	2	1	3	3
(Canada) (Mexico) (United States) 2026	Did not qualify									4	0	1	3	4	10
(Morocco) (Portugal) (Spain) 2030	To be determined									To be determined					
(Saudi Arabia) 2034	To be determined									To be determined					
Total	—	0/10	—							45	11	7	27	42	86

=== CONCACAF Gold Cup ===
CONCACAF Championship / Gold Cup record
Year	Round	Pos.	Pld	W	D	L	GF	GA	Squad
1963 to 1973	Did not participate								
(Mexico) 1977	Did not qualify								
(Honduras) 1981	Withdrew								
1985 to 1991	Did not participate								
1993 to 2025	Did not qualify								
Total	—	0/17	—						

=== CONCACAF Nations League ===
CONCACAF Nations League record
League phase											Final phase								
Season	Div.	Group	Pos.	Pld	W	D	L	GF	GA	P/R	Finals	Round	Pld	W	D	L	GF	GA	Squad
2019–20	C	A	3rd	6	4	0	2	14	4	▲	(United States) 2021	Ineligible							
2022–23	B	A	13th	6	1	0	5	3	9	Same position	(United States) 2023	Ineligible							
2023–24	B	B	16th	6	0	0	6	7	26	▼	(United States) 2024	Ineligible							
2024–25	C	A	1st	4	4	0	0	17	4	▲	(United States) 2025	Ineligible							
2026–27	B	To be determined									2027	Ineligible							
Total				22	9	!0	13	41	43	—	Total	—	0/4	—					

CONCACAF Nations League history
First match	Barbados 4–0 Saint Martin (5 September 2019; Bridgetown, Barbados)
Biggest win	U.S. Virgin Islands 0–5 Barbados (9 October 2024; Wildey, Barbados)
Biggest defeat	Dominican Republic 5–0 Barbados (11 September 2023; Wildey, Barbados)
Best result	13th – League B (2022–23)
Worst result	Relegation League C (2023–24)

=== Caribbean Cup ===
CFU Championship / Caribbean Cup record									Qualification record					
Year	Round	Pos.	Pld	W	D	L	GF	GA	Pld	W	D	L	GF	GA
(Trinidad and Tobago) 1978	First round	—	2	0	1	1	0	1	—					
(Suriname) 1979	Did not participate								Did not participate					
(Puerto Rico) 1981	Did not qualify								2	0	2	0	2	2
(French Guiana) 1983	Did not qualify								4	1	2	1	2	3
(Barbados) 1985	Runners-up	2nd	3	0	3	0	2	2	Qualified as host					
(Martinique) 1988	Did not qualify								2	0	0	2	1	9
(Barbados) 1989	Group stage	5th	2	1	0	1	1	3	Qualified as host					
(Trinidad and Tobago) 1990	Unfinished	—	2	1	1	0	5	4	3	2	1	0	3	1
(Jamaica) 1991	Did not participate								Did not participate					
(Trinidad and Tobago) 1992	Did not qualify								3	1	1	1	4	4
(Jamaica) 1993	Did not qualify								3	2	0	1	9	2
(Trinidad and Tobago) 1994	Group stage	6th	3	0	2	1	3	5	2	1	0	1	4	3
(Cayman Islands) (Jamaica) 1995	Did not qualify								4	2	1	1	9	3
(Trinidad and Tobago) 1996	Did not qualify								2	1	0	1	2	2
(Antigua and Barbuda) (Saint Kitts and Nevis) 1997	Did not qualify								2	1	1	0	3	1
(Jamaica) (Trinidad and Tobago) 1998	Did not qualify								3	1	0	2	6	9
(Trinidad and Tobago) 1999	Did not qualify								5	3	1	1	9	4
(Trinidad and Tobago) 2001	Group stage	8th	3	0	0	3	2	10	3	2	1	0	9	5
(Barbados) 2005	Fourth place	4th	3	0	0	3	2	7	Qualified as host					
(Trinidad and Tobago) 2007	Group stage	8th	3	0	1	2	3	6	6	4	2	0	17	5
(Jamaica) 2008	Group stage	8th	3	0	0	3	4	8	5	4	1	0	11	6
(Martinique) 2010	Did not qualify								3	1	2	0	6	1
(Antigua and Barbuda) 2012	Did not qualify								3	2	0	1	3	2
(Jamaica) 2014	Did not qualify								6	2	1	3	12	13
(Martinique) 2017	Did not qualify								2	1	0	1	1	2
Total	Runners-up	9/21	24	2	8	14	22	46	63	31	16	16	113	77

== Head-to-head record ==
As of 5 October 2026, These all-time records are exclusively class 'A' internationals matches.

Key

Winning record Equal record Losing record

Opponent	Pld	W	D	L	GF	GA
Anguilla	2	2	0	0	8	1
Antigua and Barbuda	9	6	1	2	16	10
Aruba	8	5	1	2	17	11
Bahamas	3	3	0	0	11	5
Belize	2	0	1	1	0	1
Bermuda	18	7	4	7	26	31
Bonaire	2	2	0	0	7	3
British Virgin Islands	1	1	0	0	2	1
Canada	3	0	0	3	2	9
Cayman Islands	3	2	0	1	11	4
Costa Rica	2	1	0	1	2	4
Cuba	8	0	4	4	3	12
Curaçao	2	1	0	1	2	4
Dominica	15	8	4	3	21	12
Dominican Republic	5	0	1	4	3	14
El Salvador	1	0	0	1	0	3
Finland	1	0	1	0	0	0
French Guiana	2	0	0	2	0	5
Grenada	28	11	12	5	48	32
Guadeloupe	8	1	3	4	7	10
Guatemala	3	0	1	2	1	5
Guyana	42	10	12	20	49	80
Haiti	4	1	0	3	6	11
Jamaica	23	5	6	12	23	33
Martinique	14	2	5	7	21	30
Montserrat	3	1	0	2	9	7
Netherlands Antilles	5	2	1	2	4	5
Nicaragua	3	0	0	3	1	10
Northern Ireland	1	0	1	0	1	1
Panama	1	0	0	1	0	1
Puerto Rico	2	0	0	2	0	2
Saint Kitts and Nevis	12	4	2	6	19	21
Saint Lucia	11	6	2	3	21	11
Saint Martin	3	1	0	2	5	4
Saint Vincent and the Grenadines	24	8	9	7	38	33
Suriname	12	4	5	3	13	10
Sweden	1	0	0	1	0	4
Trinidad and Tobago	47	6	11	30	38	125
Turks and Caicos Islands	2	2	0	0	7	0
U.S. Virgin Islands	7	6	0	1	20	1
United States	4	0	0	4	0	20
Total	347	108	87	152	462	586

== Honours ==
=== Subcontinental / Regional ===
- CFU Championship
  - (silver) Runners-up (1): 1985

== See also ==
- Barbados men's national under-17 football team
- Football in Barbados
- Barbados 4–2 Grenada (1994 Caribbean Cup qualification)
- Sport in Barbados
