= Keith Griffith =

Barbadian footballer (1947–2025)

Personal information
- Date of birth: 1947
- Place of birth: Saint James, Barbados
- Date of death: 13 January 2025 (aged 77)

International career
| Years | Team | Apps | (Gls) |
| | Barbados | 120 | (?) |

Managerial career
- 1994: Barbados
- 1995–1997: Antigua and Barbuda (technical director)
- 1997–2000: Anguilla (technical director)
- 2000–2002: Cayman Islands (technical director)
- 2002–2008: Barbados
- 2008: Joe Public
- 2011: US Virgin Islands
- 2011–2013: US Virgin Islands (technical director)

Keith "Grell" Griffith (1947 – 13 January 2025) was a Barbadian professional footballer and later technical director of the US Virgin Island national team. Prior to this, Griffith was coach of the Barbados national team, Trinidad and Tobago's Joe Public F.C., and technical director of Antigua and Barbuda, Anguilla, and the Cayman Islands. Griffith has been called a "well-known hero on the Caribbean scene."

Griffith was born in 1947, and died on 13 January 2025, at the age of 77.
