= Terrence Jones (soccer) =

United States Virgin Islands footballer and manager

Personal information
- Full name: Terrence Jones Sr.
- Date of birth: April 13, 1968 (age 58)
- Place of birth: United States Virgin Islands
- Positions: Goalkeeper; forward

Senior career*
Years	Team	Apps	(Gls)
- Rovers FC
- Positive Vibes

International career^{‡}
2000–2011	U.S.Virgin Islands	10	(0)

Managerial career
- 2010–2011: New Vibes
- 2024-: U.S.Virgin Islands
- * Club domestic league appearances and goals ‡ National team caps and goals as of 09:40, 26 April 2019 (UTC)

Terrence Jones Sr. (born April 13, 1968) is a professional footballer and manager, and the current coach of New Vibes and United States Virgin Islands.
