= Edward Yarde (1638–1703) =

English politician

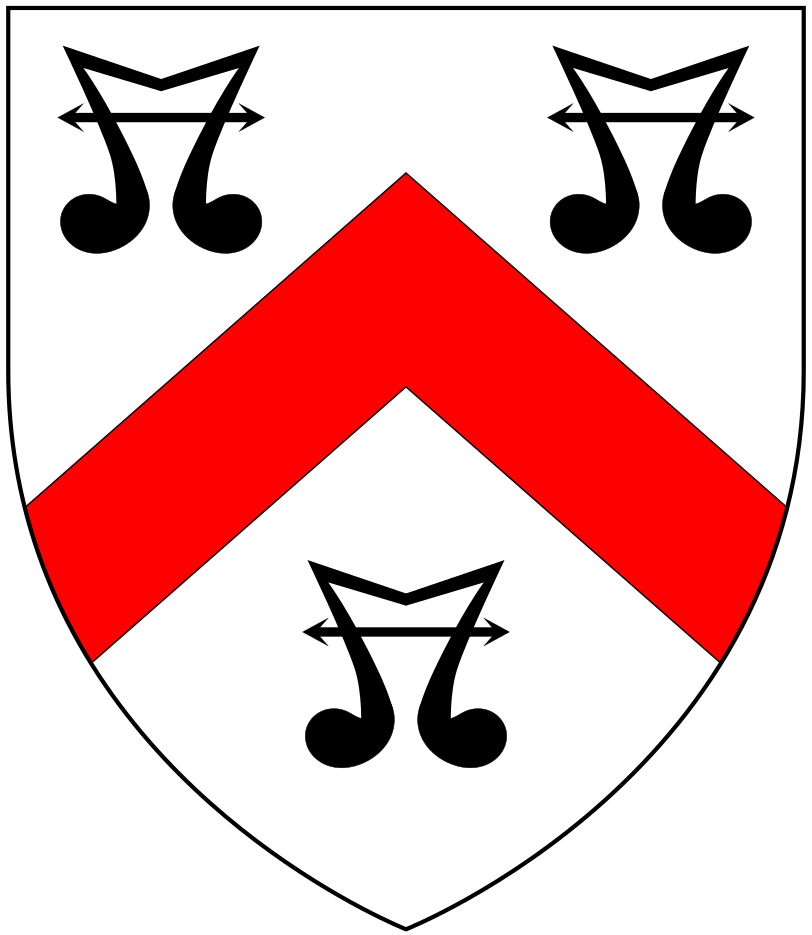
- Arms of the Yarde family

Member of Parliament for Dartmouth
- In office 1679–1681

Member of Parliament for Ashburton
- In office 1685–1685

Personal details
- Born: 1638 Devon, England
- Died: 1703 (aged 64–65)
- Children: 2 sons and 5 daughters

Edward Yarde (1638–1703), of Churston Ferrers in Devon, England, was an English politician who served as a Member of Parliament for Dartmouth in 1679 and 1681 and for Ashburton (UK Parliament constituency) in 1685.

== Early life ==
Yarde was the son of Edward Yarde of Churston Ferrers and Elizabeth Fownes, daughter of Thomas Fownes of Plymouth. He studied at Eton College from 1652 to 1656 and attended King's College, Cambridge in 1656.

On 11 October 1659, he married Anne Warre, daughter of Thomas Warre of Shepton Beauchamp, Somerset and they had two sons and five daughters including Edward Yarde, who served as Member of Parliament for Totnes from 1695 to 1698.

== Political career ==
In 1671, Yarde was appointed a justice of the peace for Devon, serving until 1687 and again from October 1688 until his death. He became vice-warden of the stannaries and captain of the militia foot at Ashburton In 1676.

In 1679, Yarde was elected as Member of Parliament for Dartmouth at the second general election and was returned again in 1681.

In 1685, he was elected as Member of Parliament for Ashburton. During the reign of James II of England, Yarde was removed from office but was later restored to the commission of the peace following the Glorious Revolution.

== Death ==
Yarde was buried at Brixham on 11 August 1703.
