= Johann Friedrich Gaab =

German theologian

- Born: 10 October 1761; Göppingen
- Died: 2 March 1832
- Occupations: Theologian, librarian, prelate
- Employer: University of Tübingen

Johann Friedrich Gaab (10 October 1761 in Göppingen – 2 March 1832 in Tübingen) was a German theologian, university professor, and general superintendent.

== Life ==
After passing the entry exam (Landexamen) and attending the monastery schools in Blaubeuren and Bebenhausen, he entered the Protestant Theological Seminary in Tübingen in 1779 and graduated with a Master's degree in Philosophy in 1781. After a position as Hofmeister in Switzerland, he returned to Tübingen and became supervisor of the seminary library in 1787. In 1788 he was appointed as a repetiteur, and in 1792 he became an associate professor of philosophy.

In 1798 Gaab was appointed full professor. In 1806 he became a member of the Senate and Ephorus of the Seminary, in 1811 Headmaster of the University of Tübingen and in 1814 university librarian. From 1815 Gaab was prelate and superintendent general of Tübingen. As such, he was a member of the Estates of Württemberg from 1819 to 1831. In 1817, the University of Tübingen appointed him a Doctor of Theology.

In 1831 he was awarded the Order of the Württemberg Crown.

== Publications (selection) ==
From 1793 to 1809 Gaab was editor of the Tübingen gelehrten Anzeigen.

- Abhandlungen zur Dogmengeschichte der ältern griechischen Kirche bis auf die Zeit Clemens von Alexandrien. 1790 (anonym)
- Apologie Gregors VII. 1792
- Beiträge zur Erklärung des sogenannten Hohenliedes, Koheleths und der Klagelieder. 1795.
- Kleine Aufsätze für die Geschichte. 1797.
- Handbuch zum philosophischen Verstehen der apokryphischen Schriften des Alten Testaments. 1818 und 1819.
