= Colin Forde (footballer, born 1963) =

Barbadian footballer, manager, and coach

Colin "Potato" Forde (born 15 May 1963) is a Barbadian football manager, coach and former footballer.

A midfielder in his playing days, Forde was the manager of the Barbados national football team from 2011 until his resignation in November 2014.
