= Edward Yarde =

English politician (1669–1735)

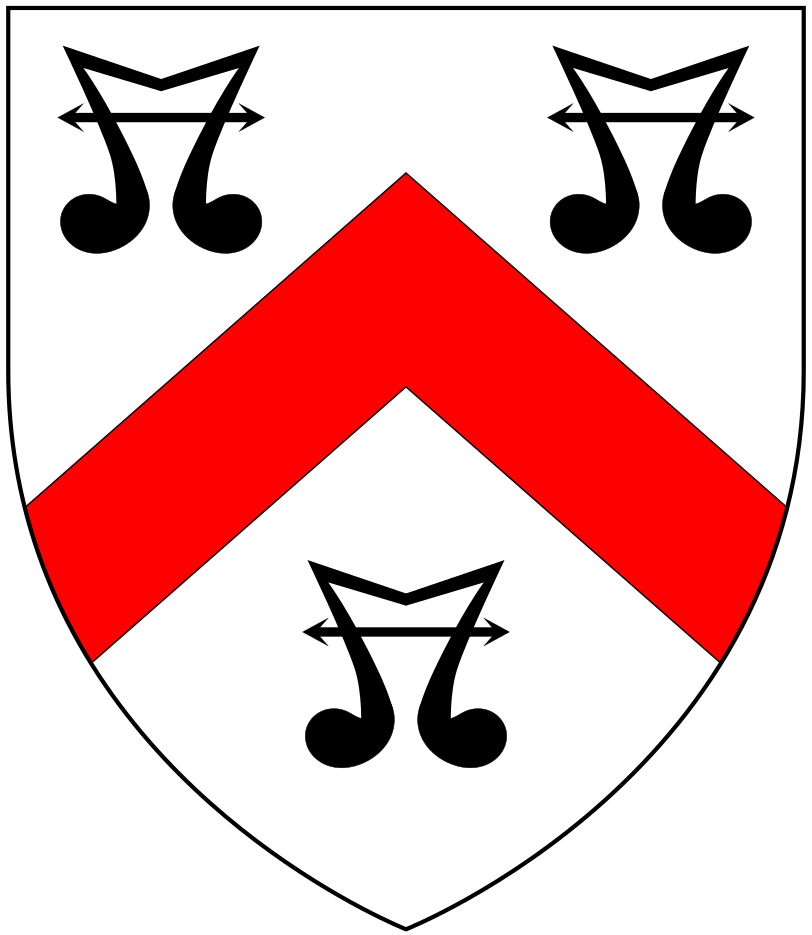
Arms of Yarde: Argent, a chevron gules between three water bougets sable

Edward Yarde (1669–1735), of Churston Court in the parish of Churston Ferrers in Devon, England, was a Member of Parliament for Totnes in Devon 1695–1698.

He was the eldest son and heir of Edward Yarde (1638–1703) of Churston Court, MP for Ashburton in 1685, by his wife Anne Warre (died 1697), a daughter of Thomas Warre of Somerset.

In 1696 he married Susanna Sparke (died 1733), a member of the prominent Sparke family of The Friary, in the parish of St Jude, Plymouth, and widow of Henry II Northleigh (1643–1694) of Peamore, Exminster, three times MP for Okehampton. Henry Northleigh's sister Elizabeth Northleigh was the wife of Gilbert Yarde (died 1691/2), heir of Highweek and Bradley. Henry II Northleigh was the son and heir of Henry I Northleigh (1612–1675) by his wife Lettice Yard (born 1609), second surviving daughter of Edward Yard (1583–1612) of Churston Ferrers. and great-aunt of Edward Yard (died 1735). By his wife he had five sons, three of whom died young, including:

- John Yarde (1702–1773) of Churston Court, eldest son and heir, whose only son Edward Yard (died 1752) predeceased him without children.
- Francis Yarde (1703/4–1749/50), fifth son, who married his cousin Elizabeth Northleigh, by whom he had a daughter and sole heiress Susanna Yarde (born 1740), who became (in her issue) the heiress of her uncle John Yarde (1702–1773) of Churston Court. She married the judge Sir Francis Buller, 1st Baronet (1746–1800) of Downes, Crediton, and her eldest surviving son was Sir Francis Yarde-Buller (1767–1833), who in compliance with the will of his maternal great-uncle John Yarde (1702–1773) assumed the surname Yarde in lieu of his patronymic, but later by royal sign manual added the additional surname Buller. His eldest surviving son was John Yarde-Buller, 1st Baron Churston (1799–1871), raised to the peerage in 1858, and his second surviving son was Sir Edward Manningham-Buller, 1st Baronet (1800–1882) of Dilhorne, Towcester, Northamptonshire (ancestor of Viscount Dilhorne), created a baronet in 1866, who adopted the surname Manningham in addition to and before his patronymic.
