= 2002 CAF Champions League group stage =

The group stage of the 2002 CAF Champions League was played from 3 August to 19 October 2002. A total of eight teams competed in the group stage, the group winners and runners-up advance to the Knockout stage playing semifinal rounds before the final.

== Format ==
In the group stage, each group was played on a home-and-away round-robin basis. The winners and the runners-up of each group advanced to the Knockout stage.

== Groups ==
Key to colours in group tables
Group winners and runners-up advance to the Knockout stage

=== Group A ===
Pos	Team	Pld	W	D	L	GF	GA	GD	Pts	Qualification
1	(Morocco) Raja Casablanca	6	4	1	1	10	8	+2	13	Advance to knockout stage
2	(Democratic Republic of the Congo) TP Mazembe	6	3	1	2	6	3	+3	10	Advance to knockout stage
3	(Senegal) Jeanne d'Arc	6	2	0	4	7	10	−3	6	
4	(Egypt) Al Ahly	6	1	2	3	7	9	−2	5	

3 August 2002

Al Ahly (Egypt)	1–2	(Senegal) Jeanne d'Arc

Cairo International Stadium, Cairo
3 August 2002

TP Mazembe (Democratic Republic of the Congo)	2–0	(Morocco) Raja Casablanca

Stade de la Kenya, Lubumbashi

17 August 2002

Jeanne d'Arc (Senegal)	0–1	(Democratic Republic of the Congo) TP Mazembe

Dakar
18 August 2002

Raja Casablanca (Morocco)	2–1	(Egypt) Al Ahly

Stade Mohammed V, Casablanca

1 September 2002

Al Ahly (Egypt)	1–0	(Democratic Republic of the Congo) TP Mazembe

Cairo International Stadium, Cairo
1 September 2002

Jeanne d'Arc (Senegal)	1–2	(Morocco) Raja Casablanca

Dakar

14 September 2002

TP Mazembe (Democratic Republic of the Congo)	0–0	(Egypt) Al Ahly

Stade de la Kenya, Lubumbashi
15 September 2002

Raja Casablanca (Morocco)	2–1	(Senegal) Jeanne d'Arc

Stade Mohammed V, Casablanca

5 October 2002

Raja Casablanca (Morocco)	1–0	(Democratic Republic of the Congo) TP Mazembe

Stade Mohammed V, Casablanca
6 October 2002

Jeanne d'Arc (Senegal)	2–1	(Egypt) Al Ahly

Dakar

18 October 2002

TP Mazembe (Democratic Republic of the Congo)	3–1	(Senegal) Jeanne d'Arc

Stade de la Kenya, Lubumbashi
18 October 2002

Al Ahly (Egypt)	3–3	(Morocco) Raja Casablanca

Cairo International Stadium, Cairo

=== Group B ===
Pos	Team	Pld	W	D	L	GF	GA	GD	Pts	Qualification
1	(Egypt) Zamalek	6	4	1	1	10	3	+7	13	Advance to knockout stage
2	(Ivory Coast) ASEC Mimosas	6	4	0	2	12	6	+6	12	Advance to knockout stage
3	(Tunisia) ES Tunis	6	3	1	2	9	6	+3	10	
4	(Mozambique) Costa do Sol	6	0	0	6	1	17	−16	0	

2 August 2002

Zamalek (Egypt)	3–1	(Ivory Coast) ASEC Mimosas

Cairo International Stadium, Cairo
4 August 2002

Costa do Sol (Mozambique)	0–1	(Tunisia) ES Tunis

Maputo

17 August 2002

ES Tunis (Tunisia)	1–1	(Egypt) Zamalek

Stade El Menzah, Tunis
18 August 2002

ASEC Mimosas (Ivory Coast)	5–0	(Mozambique) Costa do Sol

Stade Félix Houphouët-Boigny, Abidjan

31 August 2002

Costa do Sol (Mozambique)	0–2	(Egypt) Zamalek

Maputo
31 August 2002

ES Tunis (Tunisia)	2–0	(Ivory Coast) ASEC Mimosas

Stade El Menzah, Tunis

13 September 2002

Zamalek (Egypt)	3–0	(Mozambique) Costa do Sol

Cairo International Stadium, Cairo
15 September 2002

ASEC Mimosas (Ivory Coast)	3–1	(Tunisia) ES Tunis

Stade Félix Houphouët-Boigny, Abidjan

5 October 2002

ASEC Mimosas (Ivory Coast)	1–0	(Egypt) Zamalek

Stade Félix Houphouët-Boigny, Abidjan
6 October 2002

ES Tunis (Tunisia)	4–1	(Mozambique) Costa do Sol

Stade El Menzah, Tunis

19 October 2002

Zamalek (Egypt)	1–0	(Tunisia) ES Tunis

Cairo International Stadium, Cairo
19 October 2002

Costa do Sol (Mozambique)	0–2	(Ivory Coast) ASEC Mimosas

Maputo
