= Mads Winther =

Danish footballer (born 2001)

Personal information
- Full name: Mads Skøtt Winther
- Date of birth: 20 October 2001 (age 25)
- Place of birth: Dybbøl, Denmark
- Height: 1.92 m (6 ft 4 in)
- Position: Centre-back

Youth career
- Dybbøl IU
- FC Skanderborg
- SønderjyskE

Senior career*
Years	Team	Apps	(Gls)
2019–2022	SønderjyskE	2	(0)
2022	→ 07 Vestur (loan)	8	(0)
2022	HIK	4	(0)
- * Club domestic league appearances and goals as of 21:19, 27 December 2022 (UTC)

Mads Skøtt Winther (born 20 October 2001) is a Danish footballer who plays as a centre-back.

== Career ==
=== SønderjyskE ===
Winther began his career at local club Dybbøl IU and later also played for FC Skanderborg. He later ended up at SønderjyskE as a U-15 player.

Winther came through the youth ranks of SønderjyskE, and on 5 September 2019, he got his official debut for the club in a Danish Cup game against BK Viktoria, after coming on from the bench. On 20 December 2019, Winther signed a two-year pre-contract with SønderjyskE, which would take effect from the summer of 2020.

Winther got hos Danish Superliga debut shortly before the end of the 2019–20 season, on 8 July 2020 against Lyngby Boldklub, before he was permanently promoted to the first team squad ahead of the new 2020–21 season. He played a total of 20 minutes during the whole season, between the cup and the league, in his first season on the first team.

On 15 February 2022 it was confirmed, that Winther had been loaned out to Faroese club 07 Vestur until the end of June 2022, where his contract with SønderjyskE also would expire. After returning to SønderjyskE in June 2022, he left the club, as his contract expired.

=== Later career ===
In August 2022, Winther joined Danish 2nd Division side HIK.
