= Ahmed Mohamed Ahmed =

Somali football coach and player (born 1992)

Ahmed Mohamed Ahmed Gaab
Personal information
- Full name: Ahmed Gaab Mohamed Ahmed
- Date of birth: 22 February 1980 (age 46)
- Place of birth: Somalia
- Position: Centre back

Youth career
- 1993–1997: FC Thun

Senior career*
Years	Team	Apps	(Gls)
1997–1998	FC Lerchenfeld		
1998–2002	As Napoli		
2002–2005	FC Länggasse Bern		
2006–2007	Somali Beach Soccer Team		

International career
2001–2010	Somalia	12	(0)

Managerial career
- 2007–2014: Somali Football Federation
- 2010–2011: SCM Youth A
- 2011–2014: FC Wyler Bern
- 2014–2015: BSC Young Boys Bern Youth Team
- 2015–2017: US Virgin Islands
- 2017–2019: Barbados
- 2019–: Barbados Technical Director
- * Club domestic league appearances and goals

Ahmed Mohamed Ahmed Gaab (Arabic: أحمد محمد أحمد; born 22 February 1980) is a Somali football coach and former player.

== Coaching career ==
After starting at a very young age on several positions in Somali Football Federation's observation department under the guidance of then-Federation President Abdegani Saeed Arab, who hired him because of his coaching knowledge of football, he then became head coach of the Somalia national beach soccer team and technical adviser of the Federation. He achieved his professional coaching licence as first Swiss-Somali born coach in Germany. He previously managed the Somalia national beach soccer team FC Wyler Bern Youth A Team and BSC Young Boys Youth team in Bern Switzerland.

In February 2015, he was appointed as the head coach of the U.S. Virgin Islands national football team.

In March 2017, he was appointed as the coach of the Barbadian national team.
