= Sherlock Yarde =

Barbadian football administrator and manager (died 2012)

Sherlock Yarde (unknown – 21 June 2012) was a football administrator and former manager of the Barbados national football team.

He was the president and manager of the Clayton Kola Tonic Notre Dame football club, a senior vice-president of the Barbados Football Association, chairman of selectors for the senior team and a former national team manager. He died in June 2012, aged 55, in the Queen Elizabeth Hospital, Bridgetown, Barbados.
