= Pittsburgh City United FC =

American football club

- Founded: 2021
- Dissolved: 2023
- Ground: UPMC Graham Field
- Capacity: 1,300
- Owner: Michael Anton Monsour
- Manager: Michael Anton Monsour
- League: UPSL Premier Division
- 2021: TBD
- Website: https://www.pittsburghcityunitedfc.com/blog

Pittsburgh City United FC was an American soccer club based in Pittsburgh, Pennsylvania which played in the United Premier Soccer League, the fourth tier of the United States soccer league system. The usage of both classic soccer club terms "City" and "United" in their name was a direct reference to the team's purpose of finding a cure for Alzheimer's Disease. This was present in one of the club's mottos: A City United to find a cure.

== History ==
The founding of Pittsburgh City United FC was officially announced at a press conference on June 3, 2021. It was announced at this time that the club formed an official partnership with the Alzheimer's Association and 50% of the team's profits from tickets and merchandise sales would go to the organization. The club also signed a lifetime deal with Full90 headgear which would see all PCFC players wear protective headgear during matches to spread awareness of concussions and other brain injuries. Six weeks later the club unveiled its first head coach in team history, former Dundee FC player and manager Barry Smith. Italian Nicola Martini was named Director of Scouting in July 2021. It was believed Martini would provide exposure to European clubs for Pittsburgh City United FC players. Later that month the club unveiled its first player signings including most notably US Virgin Islands international Dante Nicholas; former Sporting Clube de Macau Captain Chidi Bright Ike; and 2019 FIFA U-17 World Cup veterans Judler Delva and Jean Geffard.

== Ownership ==
The club is owned by Michael Anton Monsour. In August 2021, it was announced that Monsour was exploring fan ownership and began taking reservations on crowdfunding platform Wefunder. As of 2022 it is not clear if fan ownership ever materialized.

== Stadium ==
The club intended to initially play some home matches at the 1,300-seat UPMC Graham Field with the ambition of building its own facilities and new stadium in nearby Monroeville, Pennsylvania. Pittsburgh City United FC's home opener was played at the 5,000-seat Highmark Stadium on August 29, 2021, against Germantown.

== Record ==
Year	Division	League	Record (W–L–D)	Regular Season	Other
2021	4	UPSL	7-2-3	, Beltway North Division	24 Points, 2nd in Regular Season, Beltway North Division, Lost 3-2 Semi-Finals, Beltway North Playoffs
