= Own goal =

Goal scored against a player's own team

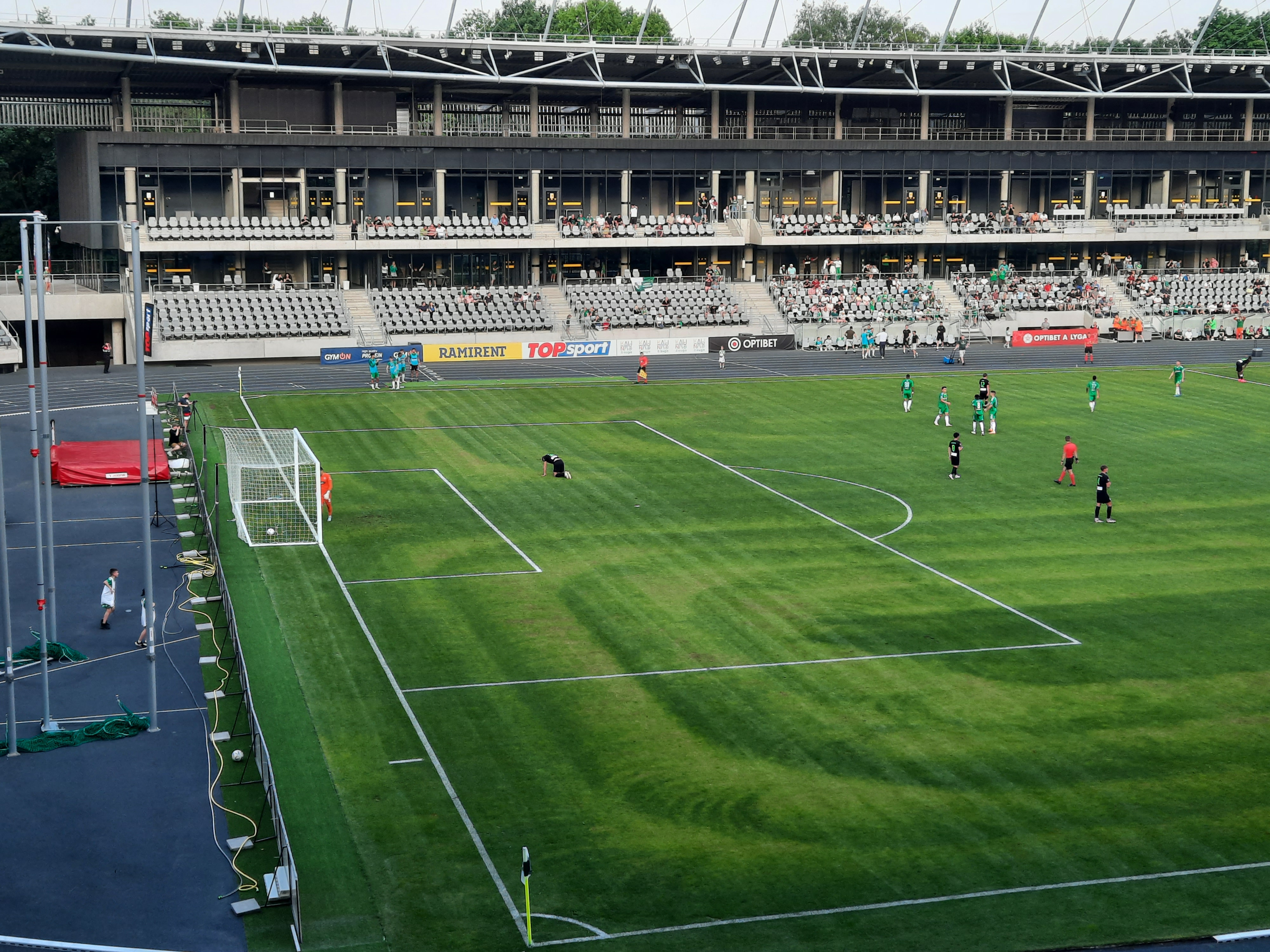
The moments after an own goal (match in 2023 Lithuanian Football Cup)

An own goal occurs in sports when a player performs actions that result in scoring points for the opposition, such as when a footballer puts a ball into their own net.

In some parts of the world, the term has become a metaphor for any action that backfires on the person or group undertaking it, sometimes carrying a sense of "poetic irony" or just the plain irony that one has "won against themselves". During The Troubles, for instance, it acquired a specific metaphorical meaning in Belfast, referring to an IED (improvised explosive device) that detonated prematurely, killing the person making or handling the bomb with the intent to harm others.

A player trying to throw a game might deliberately attempt an own goal. Such players run the risk of being sanctioned or banned from further play.

== Association football ==
In association football, an own goal occurs when a player causes the ball to go into their own team's goal, resulting in a goal being scored for the opposition. Defenders often "turn behind" dangerous balls into the penalty area, particularly crosses, by kicking or heading the ball out of play behind their goal-line. In this way, the defender's aim is to concede a corner rather than giving attacking players scoring opportunities. Consequently, the defender may misjudge and inadvertently turn the ball into their own goal, particularly if they are under pressure from attacking players who might otherwise score. While the defending player who scored the own goal is personally "credited" with the goal as part of the statistical abstract of the game (with the annotation "(og)" to indicate its nature), own goals are not added to a player's seasonal or career goalscoring total.

The Laws of the Game currently stipulate that an own goal cannot be scored directly from most methods of restarting the game; (Note: A theoretical exception is the penalty kick; however, since the ball must be kicked forward, an own goal from a penalty kick would require an extraordinary set of circumstances to occur.) instead, a corner kick is awarded to the attacking team. This is also the case for the kick-off, goal kick, (Note: A corner is awarded provided the ball left the penalty area before entering the goal; otherwise the goal kick is retaken.) (Note: This was explicitly added to the Laws of the Game in 2016, having previously been an official IFAB interpretation.) dropped-ball (since 2012), throw-in, corner kick, and free kick (indirect and direct).

The Laws do not stipulate any rules or procedures for crediting goals to players, and indeed such records are not a compulsory part of the game. In 1997 FIFA issued detailed guidelines for crediting own goals, recognising the increasing commercial importance of statistics such as top scorer awards and fantasy football. The guidelines state that credit for scoring is decided by the referee, or match commissioner if present; and "[a] defender's intervention must be deliberate in order for an own goal to be registered against him". Regarding a shot which deflects or ricochets into the goal off a defender, some sources credit the score to the attacker; others count them as own goals; for others it depends on whether the original shot was off target; others are more nuanced. There was controversy in 2013 when the Premier League credited Tim Howard with an own goal when a shot came off the post, hit him in the back, and went in.

Major competitions may have video reviews which can alter the accreditation, such as the Dubious Goals Committee of the FA Premier League. In the 2002 FIFA World Cup, one of Ronaldo's eight goals in winning the Golden Boot was initially credited as an own goal but reassigned on appeal by Brazil. UEFA's review procedure was formalised in 2008. As of 2006, the English Football League allowed the club which scored to nominate the scorer, which The Guardian decided to criticize with an example from 2002: "every single national newspaper, agency and football factbook agreed that Coventry City defender Calum Davenport had scored an own goal against Burnley. The Clarets, however, gave the goal to Gareth Taylor".

The most own goals by a player is held by Irish footballer Richard Dunne with 10 own goals in his career and the most own goals by a club is held by English team Everton F.C. The most infamous own goal was perhaps that of Andrés Escobar from Colombia in the 1994 FIFA World Cup which ended in a 2–1 loss against the United States and Colombia's ultimate elimination from the tournament. Andrés Escobar was murdered 10 days later in Medellín, in probable retaliation for his mistake.

The fastest own goal in history is believed to have been scored by Torquay United defender Pat Kruse, eight seconds into a match against Cambridge United in January 1977.

Another notable own goal was scored in a 1994 Caribbean Cup match between Barbados and Grenada. To advance in the competition Barbados needed to win by a margin of 2 or more goals. Because they were winning by just one goal as the match was nearly over, they deliberately scored an own goal to take the match into extra time to give themselves an opportunity to score a goal in extra time. Due to unusual tournament rules, this would not only win the game but also be worth 2 goals allowing them to advance on goal difference.

The most own goals scored in a match was 149 when SO Emyrne deliberately scored 149 own goals for AS Adema to protest a refereeing decision. The final score ended as 149–0; it was the biggest loss in a top division match.

== Ice hockey ==
If a goal is scored by a player on the defending team, credit for the goal goes to the last player on the other team to have touched the puck; this is because own goals in hockey are typically cases where the player so credited had the shot deflected, but this convention is used even where this is not the case. Occasionally, it is also credited to the closest player to the goal from the other team if he is determined to have caused the opposing player to shoot it into the wrong net. Assists are not awarded on an own goal because the defending team has possession of the puck between any pass and the goal itself. Occasionally in the National Hockey League, players have directed the puck into their own empty net, either late in the game or because of a delayed penalty call. This was the situation which resulted in Billy Smith of the New York Islanders becoming the first goaltender to receive credit for a goal in the NHL. Indeed, of the 20 goals scored by goaltenders in the NHL, 8 were the result of an own goal.

== Field hockey ==
Treatment of "own goals" in field hockey has varied over recent years. In 2013 the International Hockey Federation (FIH) implemented a "mandatory experiment" such that a deflection of a shot from outside the shooting circle from a defender would be equivalent to a touch from an attacker, and thus if the shot continued into the goal the score would be counted. This proved unpopular and the change was reversed.

Presently rule 8.1 states that "A goal is scored when the ball is played within the circle by an attacker and does not travel outside the circle before passing completely over the goal-line and under the crossbar." Added clarification: "The ball may be played by a defender or touch their body before or after being played in the circle by an attacker." Thus, an "own goal" may occur, but in such situations the goal will likely be credited to the attacker whose initial play into the circle was necessary for the goal to stand.

== Basketball ==
When accidentally scoring at an opposing team's basket (basketball's equivalent of an "own goal"), the goal is credited to an offensive player. One typical own-goal scenario occurs when a player tries to block a goal shot but ends up knocking the ball into the goal.

In NFHS basketball, the two points are merely listed for the scoring team, as a footnote.

In NCAA basketball, the rules state: "When a player scores a field goal in the opponent's basket, it shall count two points for the opponent regardless of the location on the playing court from where it was released. Such a field goal shall not be credited to a player in the scorebook but shall be indicated with a footnote."

In NBA rules, the goal is credited to the player on the scoring team who is closest to defensive shooter and is mentioned in a footnote.

Under FIBA rules, the player designated captain is credited with the basket, though deliberate own goals are a violation and do not score any points.

Due to point differential tiebreaker rules, there are at least two instances of players from the leading team deliberately attempting to score in the opponent's basket to force an overtime. These were in the Philippines' 67–65 quarterfinal group match win over Kazakhstan in the 2014 Asian Games and in Georgia's 96–94 group stage victory over the Philippines in the 2024 Riga FIBA Men's Olympic Qualifying Tournament. To advance to their respective semifinals, the Philippines needed to win by 11 or more points against Kazakhstan, and Georgia had to win by 19 or more points against the Philippines.

== American football ==
When a ball carrier is tackled or exits the field of play within the end zone being defended by his team, the result is a safety and the opposing team is awarded two points, and receives the ball after a free kick taken at the twenty-yard line (this does not apply if the ball carrier secures possession of the ball in the end zone as a result of an interception or a kick; in that case, no points are awarded and the play is considered a touchback).

A true "own goal", in which the team place kicks or drop kicks the ball through their own goal posts (which has never happened at any level in football history and would require either a very strong headwind or a deliberate act of sabotage), is treated as any other backward kick in most leagues' rule books. Backward kicks are treated as fumbles, and as such, a backward kick through the back of the end zone, including through the goal posts, is scored as a safety.

On two occasions, players disoriented after recovering a fumble have returned the ball into their own teams's end zone, believing they had scored a touchdown only to see the other team receiving a safety. Roy Riegels took a ball 69 yards (more than half the length of the field) to his own end zone during the 1929 Rose Bowl while playing for the University of California, and in 1964 Minnesota Vikings' defensive lineman Jim Marshall went 66 yards pursued by his own teammates in an attempt to prevent him from scoring two points for the San Francisco 49ers. Both men have been remembered for those blunders despite accomplished careers otherwise.

In the final minutes of a game, a team may take a deliberate safety in order to get the free kick, rather than punting from the end zone, or to otherwise run out the clock. In 2003, the New England Patriots came back to win a game after giving a safety that put them three points behind. Similarly, the Baltimore Ravens took a safety with twelve seconds left in Super Bowl XLVII instead of punting out of the end zone, cutting their lead to three points but winning the game since they were able to burn eight seconds off the clock with the safety play, and the opposing San Francisco 49ers were unable to score on the ensuing free kick.

== Canadian football ==
In Canadian football, if a scrimmage kick (punt or missed field goal attempt) is kicked into the end zone and the opponent does not advance it out, the kicking team is awarded a single, worth one point.

In the 2017 Grey Cup, the Calgary Stampeders deliberately took a safety when their punter Rob Maver, having lost control of a high snap, was faced with loss of down deep in his own territory. He intentionally kicked the ball backwards through the back of his own end zone for a safety.

== Gaelic football ==
Gaelic footballers can play the ball with their hands; therefore, they have a much greater degree of control over the ball and thus, own goals are much rarer than they are in association football. They do occur, and two were scored by Mayo in the drawn 2016 All-Ireland SFC Final.

As an own goal is scored when the ball goes under the crossbar, so an "own point" is scored (like any other point) when the ball goes over the crossbar. However, when a shot on goal is deflected over the bar by the defending team, the point is credited to the attacker who shot and not considered an "own point". Genuine examples of own points are very rare; one was scored by Stefan Connolly in the Cavan championship in 2015, while Seanie Malone scored an own point in the final of the 2019 Clare Senior Football Championship.

== Hurling ==
Kildare player Niall Ó Muineacháin scored an own goal against London in the opening minute of the 2022 Christy Ring Cup contest. Lancashire GAA corner back Phil Shine also has the unfortunate title of scoring an own goal in the opening round of the Lory Meagher Championship against Longford in 2023.

== Australian rules football ==
As a legitimate defensive play, an Australian rules football defender may concede an "own score". Such a score, referred to as a rushed behind and statistically credited to no player (score sheets simply include the tally of rushed behinds), results in the opposition team scoring one point. A defending player may choose to concede a rushed behind when the risk of the opposition scoring a goal (worth six points) is high. It is impossible for a team to concede an own goal worth six points.

== Analogous concepts ==
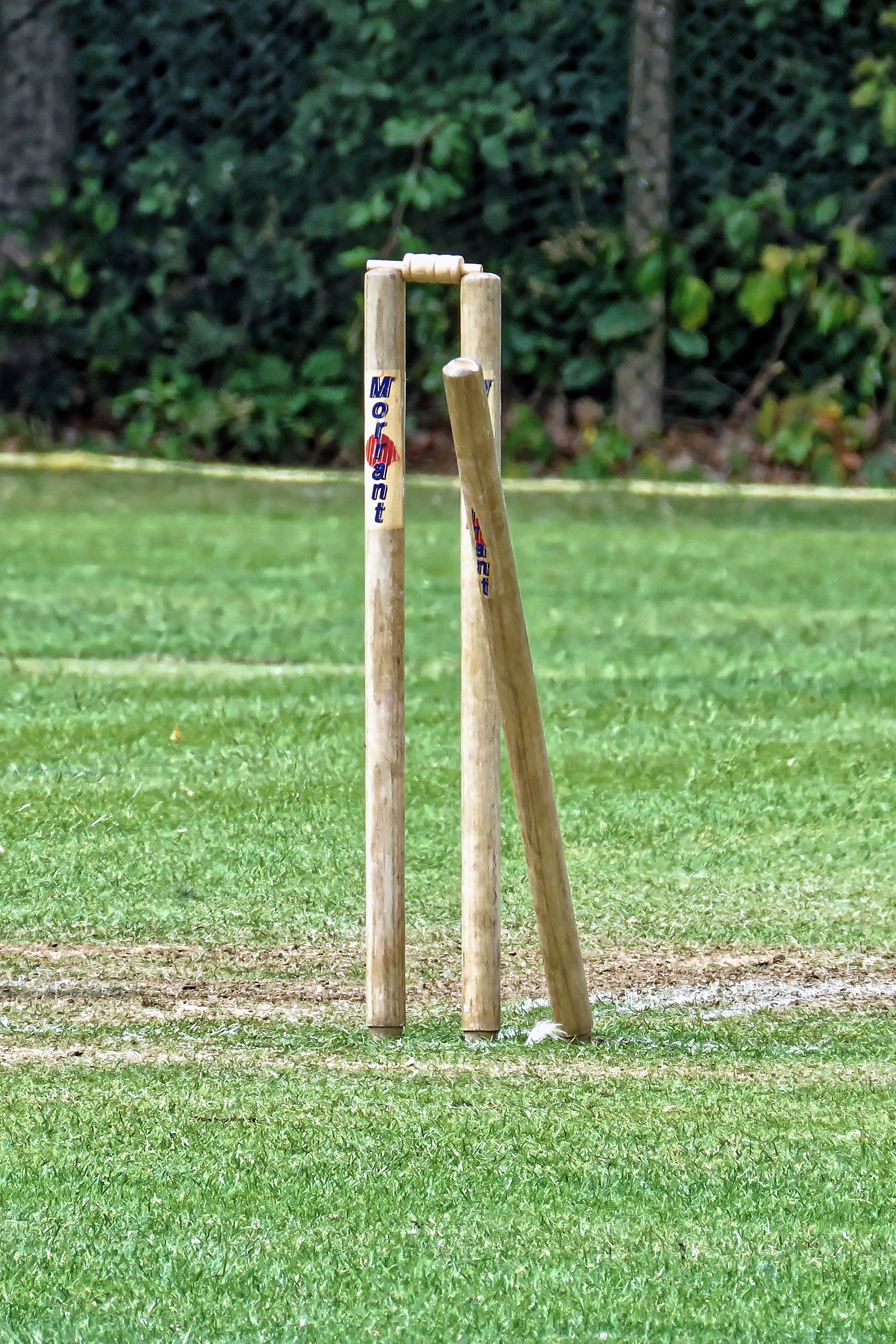
A wicket which has been disturbed from its normal position. For a hit wicket dismissal to occur, a batter must disturb the wicket with their own person or equipment.

The hit wicket method of dismissal in cricket has been compared to the own goal concept, as it involves a batter getting themselves out (eliminated from play) with no involvement from the other team.
