= 2018 CONCACAF U-20 Championship =

Concacaf UNDER-20 CHAMPIONSHIP USA 2018
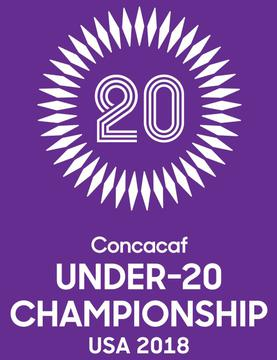

Tournament details
- Host country: United States
- Dates: November 1–21
- Teams: 34 (from 1 confederation)
- Venues: 4 (in 1 host city)

Final positions
- Champions: United States (2nd title)
- Runners-up: Mexico

Tournament statistics
- Matches played: 87
- Goals scored: 397 (4.56 per match)
- Top scorer: (Mexico) José Juan Macías (10 goals)
- Best player: (United States) Alex Méndez
- Best goalkeeper: (United States) Brady Scott
- Fair play award: Mexico

The 2018 CONCACAF Under-20 Championship was the sixth edition of the CONCACAF Under-20 Championship (27th edition if all eras included), the men's under-20 international football tournament organized by CONCACAF. It was hosted in the United States from November 1–21.

A new format was announced, removing the regional Central American and Caribbean qualifiers and guaranteeing each entrant a minimum of four competitive games.

The competition would determine the four CONCACAF representatives at the 2019 FIFA U-20 World Cup in Poland, The United States, Mexico, Panama and Honduras qualified. It would also determine the CONCACAF teams playing at the 2019 Pan American Games men's football tournament in Lima, Peru.

The United States were the defending champions of the competition. They successfully defended their title as hosts, winning the final 2–0 against Mexico for their 2nd CONCACAF U-20 Championship title.

== Teams ==
Unlike previous tournament, there was no qualification for this edition, and a total of 34 teams (out of 41 CONCACAF members) directly entered the final tournament. Among them are all three members of the North American Football Union (NAFU), all seven members of the Central American Football Union (UNCAF), and 24 (out of 31) members of the Caribbean Football Union (CFU).

Zone	Team	Appearance	Previous best performance	Previous FIFA U-20 World Cup appearances
NAFU	Canada	23rd	Champions (1986, 1996)	8
NAFU	Mexico	26th	Champions (1962, 1970, 1973, 1974, 1976, 1978, 1980, 1984, 1990, 1992, 2011, 2013, 2015)	15
NAFU	United States (title holders & hosts)	24th	Champions (2017)	15
UNCAF	Belize	2nd	First round (1994)	0
UNCAF	Costa Rica	20th	Champions (1988, 2009)	9
UNCAF	El Salvador	17th	Champions (1964)	1
UNCAF	Guatemala	19th	Runners-up (1962, 1973)	1
UNCAF	Honduras	19th	Champions (1982, 1994)	7
UNCAF	Nicaragua	9th	Second round (1976)	0
UNCAF	Panama	11th	Runners-up (2015)	5
CFU	Antigua and Barbuda	4th	First round (1980, 1986, 2017)	0
CFU	Aruba	2nd	First round (2015)	0
CFU	Barbados	6th	First round (1976, 1980, 1984, 1986, 1990)	0
CFU	Bermuda	13th	Second round (1974, 1980)	0
CFU	Cayman Islands	1st	Debut	0
CFU	Cuba	13th	Runners-up (1970, 1974)	1
CFU	Curaçao (Note: Includes appearances as the Netherlands Antilles.)	13th	Third place (1962)	0
CFU	Dominica	1st	Debut	0
CFU	Dominican Republic	5th	Second round (1976)	0
CFU	Grenada	4th	First round (1978, 1980, 1990)	0
CFU	Guadeloupe (Note: Non-FIFA members and thus ineligible to play in the qualification stage.)	3rd	First round (1992, 2011)	0
CFU	Guyana	3rd	Second round (1984)	0
CFU	Haiti	9th	Second round (1978)	0
CFU	Jamaica	20th	Third place (1970)	1
CFU	Martinique	3rd	First round (1994, 1996)	0
CFU	Puerto Rico	8th	First round (1974, 1976, 1978, 1980, 1982, 1984, 2013)	0
CFU	Saint Kitts and Nevis	3rd	First round (2007, 2017)	0
CFU	Saint Lucia	1st	Debut	0
CFU	Saint Martin	1st	Debut	0
CFU	Saint Vincent and the Grenadines	1st	Debut	0
CFU	Sint Maarten	1st	Debut	0
CFU	Suriname	6th	First round (1976, 1980, 1986, 1990, 2011)	0
CFU	Trinidad and Tobago	20th	Runners-up (1990)	2
CFU	U.S. Virgin Islands	1st	Debut	0

Notes

Did not enter

- Anguilla
- Bahamas
- Bonaire
- British Virgin Islands
- French Guiana
- Montserrat (withdrew)
- Turks and Caicos Islands

== Venues ==
Matches were at played at four stadiums in the IMG Academy in Bradenton, Florida:

- IMG Academy Stadium
- IMG Soccer Stadium
- IMG Soccer Complex Field #2
- IMG Soccer Complex Field #11

Bradenton, Florida	Location of the host city of the 2018 CONCACAF U-20 Championship.
IMG Academy	Location of the host city of the 2018 CONCACAF U-20 Championship.
27.4409°N 82.6081°W	Location of the host city of the 2018 CONCACAF U-20 Championship.
Capacity: 5,000	Location of the host city of the 2018 CONCACAF U-20 Championship.

== Draw ==
The draw for the final tournament was held on 13 September 2018, 10:00 EDT (UTC−4), at the CONCACAF Headquarters in Miami, Florida, United States. Based on the CONCACAF Men's Under-20 Ranking, the top six ranked teams were seeded into position one of each group, while the remaining 28 teams were distributed in five pots as follows:

Seeded teams	Pot 1	Pot 2	Pot 3	Pot 4	Pot 5
United States (A1); Mexico (B1); Honduras (C1); Panama (D1); Costa Rica (E1); El Salvador (F1)	Cuba; Guatemala; Trinidad and Tobago; Haiti; Canada; Jamaica	Antigua and Barbuda; Bermuda; Saint Kitts and Nevis; Curaçao; Aruba; Suriname	Nicaragua; Dominican Republic; Puerto Rico; Guadeloupe; Saint Lucia; Guyana	Saint Vincent and the Grenadines; Grenada; Cayman Islands; Barbados; Belize; Dominica	U.S. Virgin Islands; Martinique; Sint Maarten; Saint Martin

The 34 teams were drawn into six groups: four groups of six teams and two groups of five teams. The winners from each group in the group stage advance to the qualification stage, where the six teams are divided into two groups of three teams (winners of Groups A, C and E in one group, winners of Groups B, D and F in another group). The top two teams from each group in the qualification stage qualify for the 2019 FIFA U-20 World Cup, with the group winners also advancing to the final to decide the champions of the CONCACAF U-20 Championship.

== Squads ==
Players born on or after 1 January 1999 are eligible to compete. Each team must submit a provisional 35-player roster (4 must be goalkeepers) and a final 20-player roster (2 must be goalkeepers). After the completion of the group stage, a team advancing to the qualification stage may replace up to six players with those from the provisional roster.

== Group stage ==
The winners of each group in the group stage advance to the qualification stage. If the winners of a group is a non-FIFA member, the highest-ranked FIFA member in the group advances to the qualification stage (Regulations Article 12.9).

Tiebreakers (both group stage and qualification stage)

Teams are ranked according to points (3 points for a win, 1 point for a draw, 0 points for a loss). The rankings of teams in each group are determined as follows (regulations Articles 12.5 and 12.8):

1. points obtained in all group matches;
2. goal difference in all group matches;
3. number of goals scored in all group matches;

If two or more teams are equal on the basis of the above three criteria, their rankings are determined as follows:

4. points obtained in the group matches between the teams concerned;
5. goal difference in the group matches between the teams concerned;
6. number of goals scored in the group matches between the teams concerned;
7. fair play points in all group matches:
  - first yellow card: minus 1 point;
  - indirect red card (second yellow card): minus 3 points;
  - direct red card: minus 4 points;
  - yellow card and direct red card: minus 5 points;
8. drawing of lots by CONCACAF.

All times are local, EDT (UTC−4) up to 3 November, EST (UTC−5) starting 4 November.

=== Group A ===
Pos	Team	Pld	W	D	L	GF	GA	GD	Pts	Qualification
1	United States (H)	5	5	0	0	39	2	+37	15	Qualification stage
2	Suriname	5	3	0	2	18	12	+6	9	
3	Puerto Rico	5	3	0	2	16	15	+1	9	
4	Trinidad and Tobago	5	3	0	2	12	11	+1	9	
5	Saint Vincent and the Grenadines	5	1	0	4	8	15	−7	3	
6	U.S. Virgin Islands	5	0	0	5	2	40	−38	0	

Source: CONCACAF
Rules for classification: Group stage tiebreakers
(H) Hosts
1 November 2018
12:45

Trinidad and Tobago	3–2	Saint Vincent and the Grenadines
Prowell 39'; Ramdeen 90+2'; Garcia 90+5'	Report	G. Francis 15', 19'

IMG Soccer Complex Field #2, Bradenton, Florida
Referee: Daneon Parchment (Jamaica)
1 November 2018
15:00

Suriname	13–2	U.S. Virgin Islands
Doorson 3', 51'; Elshot 19', 34', 36'; R. Vlijter 22', 63'; Verwey 47', 52', 74'; Vola 50'; Rigters 70'; Hoepel 86'	Report	Joseph 55'; McGuiness 81' (pen.)

IMG Soccer Complex Field #11, Bradenton, Florida
Referee: Melvin Matamoros (Honduras)
1 November 2018
17:00

United States	7–1	Puerto Rico
Cardona 5' (o.g.); Méndez 11'; Pomykal 28'; Akinola 49', 69'; Rennicks 57' (pen.); Llanez 86'	Report	Cosme 33'

IMG Academy Stadium, Bradenton, Florida
Referee: Hector Martínez (Honduras)

3 November 2018
15:00

Puerto Rico	1–5	Trinidad and Tobago
Díaz 53'	Report	Rochford 25'; Lee 40', 57'; Sween 80'; Francis 90+4'

IMG Soccer Complex Field #2, Bradenton, Florida
Referee: Adonai Escobedo Gonzalez (Mexico)
3 November 2018
17:30

Saint Vincent and the Grenadines	1–2	Suriname
Da Souza 22'	Report	G. Vlijter 29'; Verwey 31'

IMG Soccer Stadium, Bradenton, Florida
Referee: Benjamín Pineda Avila (Costa Rica)
3 November 2018
18:00

U.S. Virgin Islands	0–13	United States
	Report	Dorsey 4'; Akinola 20'; Llanez 23', 30', 40'; Fontana 42'; Rennicks 62', 66'; McKenzie 63', 82'; Pomykal 68'; Méndez 80' (pen.); Perez 90+2'

IMG Academy Stadium, Bradenton, Florida
Attendance: 620
Referee: Keylor Herrera (Costa Rica)

5 November 2018
15:00

Saint Vincent and the Grenadines	3–0	U.S. Virgin Islands
Da Souza 22'; Fraser 67'; Francis 84'	Report

IMG Soccer Complex Field #11, Bradenton, Florida
Referee: Damien Rosa (France)
5 November 2018
15:00

Suriname	1–2	Puerto Rico
Godlieb 25'	Report	Servania 74', 90+3'

IMG Soccer Complex Field #2, Bradenton, Florida
Referee: Trevester Richards (Saint Kitts and Nevis)
5 November 2018
19:45

United States	6–1	Trinidad and Tobago
Servania 6'; Homer 8' (o.g.); Pomykal 45'; Méndez 52'; Llanez 56'; Torres 90+3'	Report	Lee 54'

IMG Academy Stadium, Bradenton, Florida
Attendance: 1,100
Referee: Juan Calderón Pérez (Costa Rica)

7 November 2018
15:00

Puerto Rico	8–0	U.S. Virgin Islands
Hernández 26', 56'; Rabell 46', 85'; Servania 51', 71', 88' (pen.); Montañez 82'	Report

IMG Soccer Complex Field #2, Bradenton, Florida
Referee: Benjamín Pineda Avila (Costa Rica)
7 November 2018
19:45

Trinidad and Tobago	0–2	Suriname
	Report	Cairo 29'; Elshot 70'

IMG Academy Stadium, Bradenton, Florida
Referee: Bryan López Castellanos (Guatemala)
7 November 2018
20:00

Saint Vincent and the Grenadines	0–6	United States
	Report	Torres 46'; Llanez 59'; Fontana 66', 81', 86'; Servania 90'

IMG Soccer Stadium, Bradenton, Florida
Attendance: 130
Referee: Pierre-Luc Lauzière (Canada)

9 November 2018
15:00

Puerto Rico	4–2	Saint Vincent and the Grenadines
Servania 4', 68'; Rabell 16'; Montañez 76'	Report	Fraser 19'; Da Souza 37'

IMG Soccer Complex Field #11, Bradenton, Florida
Referee: Neressa Goldson (Jamaica)
9 November 2018
15:00

U.S. Virgin Islands	0–3	Trinidad and Tobago
	Report	Orr 1'; Lee 77'; Benny 90'

IMG Soccer Complex Field #2, Bradenton, Florida
Referee: Kimbell Ward (Saint Kitts and Nevis)
9 November 2018
17:30

United States	7–0	Suriname
Méndez 7', 83' (pen.); McKenzie 26'; Akinola 43', 45+1'; Torres 60'; Rennicks 79'	Report

IMG Academy Stadium, Bradenton, Florida
Referee: Ismael Cornejo Meléndez (El Salvador)

=== Group B ===
Pos	Team	Pld	W	D	L	GF	GA	GD	Pts	Qualification
1	Mexico	5	4	1	0	31	2	+29	13	Qualification stage
2	Jamaica	5	4	1	0	24	3	+21	13	
3	Grenada	5	2	0	3	7	14	−7	6	
4	Nicaragua	5	2	0	3	4	13	−9	6	
5	Aruba	5	1	1	3	6	20	−14	4	
6	Saint Martin (Note: Non-FIFA members and thus ineligible to play in the qualification stage.)	5	0	1	4	3	23	−20	1	

Source: CONCACAF
Rules for classification: Group stage tiebreakers
Notes:
2 November 2018
19:45 (Note: Kick-off delayed by weather.)

Mexico	7–0	Nicaragua
Macías 2', 51'; D. López 32', 44'; C. Gutiérrez 70'; Lozano 85' (pen.); Álvarez 86'	Report

IMG Academy Stadium, Bradenton, Florida
Referee: Henry Bejarano (Costa Rica)
2 November 2018
20:45

Jamaica	1–0	Grenada
Topey 87'	Report

IMG Soccer Stadium, Bradenton, Florida
Referee: Trevester Richards (Saint Kitts and Nevis)
2 November 2018
22:00

Aruba	1–1	Saint Martin
Croes 81'	Report	Arrondell 26'

IMG Soccer Complex Field #11, Bradenton, Florida
Referee: José Kellys Marquez (Panama)

4 November 2018
10:30

Grenada	0–3	Aruba
	Report	Maduro 1'; Croes 6'; Phillip 45' (o.g.)

IMG Soccer Complex Field #11, Bradenton, Florida
Referee: Fernando Morón Valdelamar (Panama)
4 November 2018
12:45

Nicaragua	0–3	Jamaica
	Report	Rochester 45+3'; Topey 75'; Daley 90+1'

IMG Soccer Complex Field #2, Bradenton, Florida
Referee: John Pitti (Panama)
4 November 2018
20:00

Saint Martin	0–4	Mexico
	Report	Sepúlveda 5', 25'; Macías 20'; E. López 46'

IMG Academy Stadium, Bradenton, Florida
Referee: Mario Escobar Toca (Guatemala)

6 November 2018
15:00

Grenada	5–2	Saint Martin
Charles 21', 27'; Stephen 30', 66'; Pierre 87'	Report	Freyer 1'; Pagesy 56'

IMG Soccer Complex Field #11, Bradenton, Florida
Referee: Carly Shaw-MacLaren (Canada)
6 November 2018
17:15

Aruba	1–2	Nicaragua
Maduro 90+2'	Report	Jacobs 74' (o.g.); Caldera 79'

IMG Soccer Stadium, Bradenton, Florida
Referee: Edgar Ramírez (El Salvador)
6 November 2018
20:00

Mexico	2–2	Jamaica
Brown 21' (o.g.); Macías 66' (pen.)	Report	Jibbison 61'; Magee 71'

IMG Academy Stadium, Bradenton, Florida
Referee: Hector Martínez (Honduras)

8 November 2018
15:00

Nicaragua	2–0	Saint Martin
Acuña 48'; Palacios 75'	Report

IMG Soccer Complex Field #2, Bradenton, Florida
Referee: Patrick Senecharles (Haiti)
8 November 2018
19:45

Jamaica	7–1	Aruba
Topey 50'; Rochester 52' (pen.), 64', 90+5' (pen.); Daley 70'; McIntosh 84', 90+1'	Report	Croes 66'

IMG Soccer Stadium, Bradenton, Florida
Referee: Oliver Vergara (Panama)
8 November 2018
20:00

Grenada	0–8	Mexico
	Report	Orona 3'; Macías 31', 71'; E. López 38', 52'; A. Gutiérrez 57'; Hernández 73'; D. López 89'

IMG Academy Stadium, Bradenton, Florida
Referee: José Kellys Marquez (Panama)

10 November 2018
15:00

Nicaragua	0–2	Grenada
	Report	Charles 34'; Braveboy 71'

IMG Soccer Complex Field #11, Bradenton, Florida
Referee: Danielle Chesky (United States)
10 November 2018
15:00

Saint Martin	0–11	Jamaica
	Report	Topey 7'; Jibbison 16', 27'; Magee 17', 83'; Daley 20', 29', 39', 53'; McIntosh 72'; Howell 88'

IMG Soccer Complex Field #2, Bradenton, Florida
Referee: Keylor Herrera (Costa Rica)
10 November 2018
16:00

Mexico	10–0	Aruba
Macías 11', 14', 42', 45'; D. López 21', 27'; Domínguez 50'; Hernández 64'; A. Gutiérrez 71'; Orona 75'	Report

IMG Academy Stadium, Bradenton, Florida
Referee: Gladwyn Johnson (Guyana)

=== Group C ===
Pos	Team	Pld	W	D	L	GF	GA	GD	Pts	Qualification
1	Honduras	5	5	0	0	30	5	+25	15	Qualification stage
2	Cuba	5	4	0	1	19	5	+14	12	
3	Dominican Republic	5	3	0	2	23	10	+13	9	
4	Antigua and Barbuda	5	2	0	3	10	11	−1	6	
5	Belize	5	1	0	4	5	19	−14	3	
6	Sint Maarten (Note: Non-FIFA members and thus ineligible to play in the qualification stage.)	5	0	0	5	4	41	−37	0	

Source: CONCACAF
Rules for classification: Group stage tiebreakers
Notes:
1 November 2018
10:30

Cuba	6–1	Belize
Rodríguez 31', 90+3'; Oviendo 33'; Ibarra 42'; G. Pérez 67'; Romero 84'	Report	Castillo 45+1' (pen.)

IMG Soccer Complex Field #2, Bradenton, Florida
Referee: Oshane Nation (Jamaica)
1 November 2018
12:45

Antigua and Barbuda	6–1	Sint Maarten
Bramble 12'; Hakeem 14', 30', 40'; Benjamin 70'; Greene 87'	Report	Drijvers 17'

IMG Soccer Complex Field #11, Bradenton, Florida
Referee: Kimbell Ward (Saint Kitts and Nevis)
1 November 2018
19:15

Honduras	7–1	Dominican Republic
Villafranca 8'; Romero 15', 74'; López 62' (pen.), 67'; Palma 80'; Guevara 90+3'	Report	Vásquez 14'

IMG Academy Stadium, Bradenton, Florida
Referee: Iván Cisneros (El Salvador)

3 November 2018
10:30

Dominican Republic	1–2	Cuba
Lavergne 79'	Report	Ibarra 8'; Oviendo 60' (pen.)

IMG Soccer Complex Field #2, Bradenton, Florida
Referee: Gladwyn Johnson (Guyana)
3 November 2018
12:45

Belize	0–1	Antigua and Barbuda
	Report	Greene 80'

IMG Soccer Complex Field #11, Bradenton, Florida
Referee: Pierre-Luc Lauzière (Canada)
3 November 2018
12:45

Sint Maarten	0–12	Honduras
	Report	Palma 6', 42'; Mejía 18', 74'; Cálix 22', 41', 62'; Guevara 30'; Villafranca 35'; Rivas 71'; Chávez 81'; Santos 86'

IMG Soccer Complex Field #2, Bradenton, Florida
Referee: Edgar Rangel Araujo (Mexico)

5 November 2018
10:30

Belize	4–2	Sint Maarten
C. Gonzalez 3', 45'; Chi 38'; Cacho 49'	Report	Zion 78'; Drijvers 84'

IMG Soccer Complex Field #11, Bradenton, Florida
Referee: Jose Torres (Puerto Rico)
5 November 2018
12:45

Antigua and Barbuda	0–3	Dominican Republic
	Report	Lavergne 45', 55'; López 86'

IMG Soccer Complex Field #2, Bradenton, Florida
Referee: Oliver Vergara (Panama)
5 November 2018
19:45

Honduras	3–1	Cuba
Cálix 31'; Mejía 84'; Palma 90+3'	Report	Oviendo 28'

IMG Soccer Stadium, Bradenton, Florida
Referee: Ismael Cornejo Meléndez (El Salvador)

7 November 2018
12:45

Dominican Republic	12–1	Sint Maarten
Paniagua 2', 31', 40', 43', 45'; Pineda 5', 36'; Vásquez 33', 66', 85'; Paredes 80'; Ángeles 86'	Report	Drijvers 87'

IMG Soccer Complex Field #11, Bradenton, Florida
Referee: Daneon Parchment (Jamaica)
7 November 2018
15:00

Belize	0–4	Honduras
	Report	Villafranca 72', 79', 90', 90+3'

IMG Soccer Complex Field #11, Bradenton, Florida
Referee: Reon Radix (Grenada)
7 November 2018
17:30

Cuba	3–0	Antigua and Barbuda
G. Pérez 23', 77'; Flores 38'	Report

IMG Soccer Stadium, Bradenton, Florida
Referee: Adonai Escobedo Gonzalez (Mexico)

9 November 2018
12:45

Dominican Republic	6–0	Belize
Ángeles 9', 43'; Paniagua 20'; Vásquez 57'; Lavergne 72'; Pineda 90+1'	Report

IMG Soccer Complex Field #11, Bradenton, Florida
Referee: Guillermo Pacheco Larios (Mexico)
9 November 2018
12:45

Sint Maarten	0–7	Cuba
	Report	G. Pérez 36', 72'; Rodríguez 45+1'; Flores 50'; J. Pérez 76'; Nodarse 79'; O. Pérez 88'

IMG Soccer Complex Field #2, Bradenton, Florida
Referee: Bryan López Castellanos (Guatemala)
9 November 2018
19:45

Honduras	4–3	Antigua and Barbuda
Palma 21'; Mejía 67'; Álvarez 71'; Guevara 89'	Report	Hakeem 5'; Isaac 16'; Bramble 42'

IMG Academy Stadium, Bradenton, Florida
Referee: Fernando Hernández Gómez (Mexico)

=== Group D ===
Pos	Team	Pld	W	D	L	GF	GA	GD	Pts	Qualification
1	Panama	5	5	0	0	17	3	+14	15	Qualification stage
2	Canada	5	3	0	2	10	6	+4	9	
3	Guadeloupe (Note: Non-FIFA members and thus ineligible to play in the qualification stage.)	5	3	0	2	9	8	+1	9	
4	Dominica	5	2	0	3	5	14	−9	6	
5	Saint Kitts and Nevis	5	1	0	4	7	10	−3	3	
6	Martinique	5	1	0	4	4	11	−7	3	

Source: CONCACAF
Rules for classification: Group stage tiebreakers
Notes:
2 November 2018
12:45

Saint Kitts and Nevis	0–1	Martinique
	Report	Henriol 87'

IMG Soccer Complex Field #11, Bradenton, Florida
Referee: Bryan López Castellanos (Guatemala)
2 November 2018
17:45

Panama	4–0	Guadeloupe
S. Díaz 38', 88'; M. Díaz 55'; Orelien 90'	Report

IMG Academy Stadium, Bradenton, Florida
Referee: Ismail Elfath (United States)
2 November 2018
18:00

Canada	4–0	Dominica
Okello 24', 32'; Hernández 81'; Bair 83'	Report

IMG Soccer Stadium, Bradenton, Florida
Referee: Juan Calderón Pérez (Costa Rica)

4 November 2018
10:30

Guadeloupe	1–2	Canada
Archimede 46'	Report	Choinière 7'; Reid 79'

IMG Soccer Complex Field #2, Bradenton, Florida
Referee: Benbito Celima (Haiti)
4 November 2018
12:45

Dominica	3–2	Saint Kitts and Nevis
Parillon 3', 66'; Cuffy 45+4'	Report	Shade 28'; Nicholls 57'

IMG Soccer Complex Field #11, Bradenton, Florida
Referee: Danielle Chesky (United States)
4 November 2018
19:45

Martinique	1–5	Panama
Henriol 89'	Report	Michalet 1' (o.g.); Orelien 32', 37'; Valanta 74'; Kirton 90+4'

IMG Soccer Stadium, Bradenton, Florida
Referee: Patrick Senecharles (Haiti)

6 November 2018
12:45

Dominica	2–1	Martinique
Parillon 50', 68'	Report	Raphael 23'

IMG Soccer Complex Field #11, Bradenton, Florida
Referee: Randy Encarnación (Dominican Republic)
6 November 2018
12:45

Saint Kitts and Nevis	2–3	Guadeloupe
Shade 5'; Simmonds 81'	Report	Bapaume 36'; Archimede 38', 85'

IMG Soccer Complex Field #2, Bradenton, Florida
Referee: Malik Badawi (United States)
6 November 2018
17:15

Panama	2–1	Canada
S. Díaz 45+2', 59'	Report	Okello 55'

IMG Academy Stadium, Bradenton, Florida
Referee: Henry Bejarano (Costa Rica)

8 November 2018
12:45

Guadeloupe	2–0	Martinique
Archimede 6'; Virginie-Jovial 81'	Report

IMG Soccer Complex Field #2, Bradenton, Florida
Referee: Edgar Rangel Araujo (Mexico)
8 November 2018
15:00

Canada	1–2	Saint Kitts and Nevis
Perruzza 72'	Report	Martin 23'; Shade 38'

IMG Soccer Complex Field #11, Bradenton, Florida
Referee: Mario Escobar Toca (Guatemala)
8 November 2018
17:30

Dominica	0–4	Panama
	Report	Valanta 18' (pen.), 75'; McKenzie 60'; West 64'

IMG Soccer Stadium, Bradenton, Florida
Referee: Melvin Matamoros (Honduras)

10 November 2018
12:45

Guadeloupe	3–0	Dominica
Laug 2'; Archimede 14', 72' (pen.)	Report

IMG Soccer Complex Field #11, Bradenton, Florida
Referee: Nikolai Nyron (Trinidad and Tobago)
10 November 2018
12:45

Martinique	1–2	Canada
Raphael 69' (pen.)	Report	Yeates 8'; Bayiha 15'

IMG Soccer Complex Field #2, Bradenton, Florida
Referee: Malik Badawi (United States)
10 November 2018
17:30

Panama	2–1	Saint Kitts and Nevis
Valanta 82'; McKenzie 84'	Report	Martin 31'

IMG Soccer Stadium, Bradenton, Florida
Referee: Juan Calderón Pérez (Costa Rica)

=== Group E ===
Pos	Team	Pld	W	D	L	GF	GA	GD	Pts	Qualification
1	Costa Rica	4	4	0	0	14	0	+14	12	Qualification stage
2	Haiti	4	3	0	1	9	1	+8	9	
3	Saint Lucia	4	2	0	2	3	8	−5	6	
4	Barbados	4	0	1	3	1	8	−7	1	
5	Bermuda	4	0	1	3	0	10	−10	1	

Source: CONCACAF
Rules for classification: Group stage tiebreakers
1 November 2018
10:30

Haiti	1–0	Saint Lucia
M. Pierre 26'	Report

IMG Soccer Complex Field #11, Bradenton, Florida
Referee: Ismael Cornejo Meléndez (El Salvador)
1 November 2018
17:30

Costa Rica	5–0	Bermuda
Araya 19', 39'; Cortés 48'; Gómez 71'; Montenegro 90+1'	Report

IMG Soccer Stadium, Bradenton, Florida
Referee: Marco Ortiz Nava (Mexico)

3 November 2018
15:00

Bermuda	0–4	Haiti
	Report	Élysée 12', 43'; Bissainthe 60' (pen.); Borgelin 90+1'

IMG Soccer Complex Field #11, Bradenton, Florida
Referee: Melvin Matamoros (Honduras)
3 November 2018
19:45

Barbados	0–2	Costa Rica
	Report	Mesén 47'; Araya 82' (pen.)

IMG Soccer Stadium, Bradenton, Florida
Referee: Rubiel Vázquez (United States)

5 November 2018
12:45

Saint Lucia	2–1	Barbados
Philip 14'; Ribot 51' (pen.)	Report	Francis 47'

IMG Soccer Complex Field #11, Bradenton, Florida
Referee: Nikolai Nyron (Trinidad and Tobago)
5 November 2018
17:30

Costa Rica	1–0	Haiti
Reyes 31'	Report

IMG Soccer Stadium, Bradenton, Florida
Referee: Iván Barton Cisneros (El Salvador)

7 November 2018
12:45

Saint Lucia	1–0	Bermuda
Richard 59'	Report

IMG Soccer Complex Field #2, Bradenton, Florida
Referee: Rubiel Vázquez (United States)
7 November 2018
17:30

Haiti	4–0	Barbados
Bissainthe 39' (pen.), 45+1'; D. Pierre 45'; Damus 90'	Report

IMG Academy Stadium, Bradenton, Florida
Referee: Fernando Hernández Gómez (Mexico)

9 November 2018
10:30

Barbados	0–0	Bermuda
	Report

IMG Soccer Complex Field #2, Bradenton, Florida
Referee: Selvin Brown Chavarria (Honduras)
9 November 2018
17:30

Saint Lucia	0–6	Costa Rica
	Report	Gamboa 45+1'; Parkins 64'; Abarca 77'; Villegas 85', 89'; Navarro 90'

IMG Soccer Stadium, Bradenton, Florida
Referee: Hector Martínez (Honduras)

=== Group F ===
Pos	Team	Pld	W	D	L	GF	GA	GD	Pts	Qualification
1	El Salvador	4	3	0	1	7	5	+2	9	Qualification stage
2	Guatemala	4	2	1	1	10	5	+5	7	
3	Curaçao	4	2	0	2	10	10	0	6	
4	Cayman Islands	4	1	1	2	8	11	−3	4	
5	Guyana	4	1	0	3	7	11	−4	3	

Source: CONCACAF
Rules for classification: Group stage tiebreakers
2 November 2018
10:30

Guatemala	4–0	Guyana
Barrientos 45'; Ardon 53'; Cifuentes 64'; Santis 72'	Report

IMG Soccer Complex Field #2, Bradenton, Florida
Referee: Fernando Hernández Gómez (Mexico)
2 November 2018
12:45

El Salvador	2–1	Curaçao
Sánchez 61'; Rosales 89'	Report	Vrutaal 79'

IMG Soccer Complex Field #2, Bradenton, Florida
Referee: Reon Radix (Grenada)

4 November 2018
15:15

Curaçao	1–3	Guatemala
Alvarado 90+3' (o.g.)	Report	Alvarado 6'; Rivas 13'; Mejía 57'

IMG Soccer Stadium, Bradenton, Florida
Referee: Guillermo Pacheco Larios (Mexico)
4 November 2018
17:30

Cayman Islands	1–3	El Salvador
Foster 56'	Report	Portillo 39' (pen.); Cruz 41'; Clavel 51'

IMG Soccer Stadium, Bradenton, Florida
Referee: Okeito Nicholson (Jamaica)

6 November 2018
10:30

Guyana	2–3	Cayman Islands
Benjamin 5'; Macey 60'	Report	Holness 45' (pen.); Foster 58'; Campbell 67'

IMG Soccer Complex Field #2, Bradenton, Florida
Referee: Filip Dujic (Canada)
6 November 2018
19:30

El Salvador	2–1	Guatemala
Henríquez 33', 59'	Report	Barrientos 13'

IMG Soccer Stadium, Bradenton, Florida
Referee: Ismail Elfath (United States)

8 November 2018
12:45

Guyana	3–4	Curaçao
Benjamin 7'; Britton 45', 58'	Report	Fermina 10'; Valpoort 27'; Jackman 33' (o.g.); Vicario 56'

IMG Soccer Complex Field #11, Bradenton, Florida
Referee: Marco Ortiz Nava (Mexico)
8 November 2018
17:30

Guatemala	2–2	Cayman Islands
Barrientos 14' (pen.); Santis 33'	Report	Parchmont 16'; Duval 54'

IMG Academy Stadium, Bradenton, Florida
Referee: John Pitti (Panama)

10 November 2018
10:30

Cayman Islands	2–4	Curaçao
Foster 26'; Clarke-Ramirez 34'	Report	Vandepitte 12', 36'; Vicario 73'; Rojer 79'

IMG Soccer Complex Field #2, Bradenton, Florida
Referee: Damien Rosa (France)
10 November 2018
19:45

Guyana	2–0	El Salvador
Benjamin 45'; Garrett 63'	Report

IMG Soccer Stadium, Bradenton, Florida
Referee: Benbito Celima (Haiti)

== Qualification stage ==
The top two teams of each group in the qualification stage qualify for the 2019 FIFA U-20 World Cup, with the winners of each group also advancing to the final to decide the champions of the CONCACAF U-20 Championship.

=== Group G ===
Pos	Team	Pld	W	D	L	GF	GA	GD	Pts	Qualification
1	United States (H)	2	2	0	0	5	0	+5	6	Final and 2019 FIFA U-20 World Cup
2	Honduras	2	0	1	1	1	2	−1	1	2019 FIFA U-20 World Cup
3	Costa Rica	2	0	1	1	1	5	−4	1	

Source: CONCACAF
Rules for classification: Qualification stage tiebreakers
(H) Hosts
13 November 2018
18:30

Honduras	1–1	Costa Rica
Villafranca 20'	Report	Gómez 47'

IMG Academy Stadium, Bradenton, Florida
Referee: Ismael Cornejo Meléndez (El Salvador)

16 November 2018
19:15

United States	4–0	Costa Rica
Méndez 15'; Llanez 19'; Torres 49'; Akinola 76'	Report

IMG Academy Stadium, Bradenton, Florida
Attendance: 1,450
Referee: Oshane Nation (Jamaica)

19 November 2018
20:00

Honduras	0–1	United States
	Report	Akinola 51'

IMG Academy Stadium, Bradenton, Florida
Attendance: 2,100
Referee: Fernando Hernández Gómez (Mexico)

=== Group H ===
Pos	Team	Pld	W	D	L	GF	GA	GD	Pts	Qualification
1	Mexico	2	1	1	0	3	2	+1	4 (Note: Fair play points: Mexico −1, Panama −2.)	Final and 2019 FIFA U-20 World Cup
2	Panama	2	1	1	0	3	2	+1	4	2019 FIFA U-20 World Cup
3	El Salvador	2	0	0	2	0	2	−2	0	

Source: CONCACAF
Rules for classification: Qualification stage tiebreakers
Notes:
13 November 2018
16:15

Panama	1–0	El Salvador
McKenzie 74'	Report

IMG Academy Stadium, Bradenton, Florida
Referee: Hector Martínez (Honduras)

16 November 2018
17:00

Mexico	1–0	El Salvador
D. López 11'	Report

IMG Academy Stadium, Bradenton, Florida
Referee: Juan Calderón Pérez (Costa Rica)

19 November 2018
17:30

Panama	2–2	Mexico
Walker 34', 45+1'	Report	D. López 53' (pen.); Hernández 61'

IMG Academy Stadium, Bradenton, Florida
Referee: Ismail Elfath (United States)

== Final ==
In the final, if the match is level at the end of 90 minutes, extra time is played, and if still tied after extra time, the match is decided by a penalty shoot-out (Regulations Article 12.10).

21 November 2018
19:00

United States	2–0	Mexico
Méndez 17', 50'	Report

IMG Academy Stadium, Bradenton, Florida
Referee: Iván Barton Cisneros (El Salvador)

== Awards ==
=== Winners ===
2018 CONCACAF U-20 Championship winners

United States
2nd title

=== Individual awards ===
The following awards were given at the conclusion of the tournament.

Award	Player
Golden Ball	(United States) Alex Méndez
Golden Boot	(Mexico) José Juan Macías (10 goals)
Golden Glove	(United States) Brady Scott
Fair Play Award	Mexico

Best XI
Goalkeepers	Defenders	Midfielders	Forwards
(United States) Brady Scott	(United States) Sergiño Dest; (United States) Chris Gloster; (United States) Mark McKenzie; (Mexico) Gilberto Sepúlveda	(United States) Brandon Servania; (United States) Alex Méndez; (Mexico) Diego Lainez	(United States) Ayo Akinola; (United States) Ulysses Llanez; (Mexico) José Juan Macías

== Goalscorers ==
There were 397 goals scored in 87 matches, for an average of 4.56 goals per match.

10 goals

- (Mexico) José Juan Macías

8 goals

- (United States) Alexis Méndez

7 goals

- (Honduras) Josué Villafranca
- (Mexico) Daniel López
- (Puerto Rico) Jaden Servania
- (United States) Ayo Akinola
- (United States) Ulysses Llanez

6 goals

- (Dominican Republic) Erick Japa
- (Guadeloupe) Luther Archimède
- (Jamaica) Nicque Daley

5 goals

- (Cuba) Geobel Pérez
- (Dominican Republic) Ronaldo Vásquez
- (Honduras) Luis Palma

4 goals

- (Antigua and Barbuda) Zayn Hakeem
- (Dominica) Jamie Parillon
- (Dominican Republic) Gerard Lavergne
- (Honduras) Cristian Cálix
- (Honduras) Carlos Mejía
- (Jamaica) Tevin Rochester
- (Jamaica) Jamoi Topey
- (Panama) Saed Díaz
- (Panama) Diego Valanta
- (Suriname) Brian Elshot
- (Suriname) Alvaro Verwey
- (Trinidad and Tobago) Isaiah Lee
- (United States) Anthony Fontana
- (United States) Justin Rennicks
- (United States) Juan Torres

3 goals

- (Aruba) Glenbert Croes
- (Canada) Noble Okello
- (Cayman Islands) Kareem Foster
- (Costa Rica) Ronaldo Araya
- (Cuba) Rolando Oviendo
- (Cuba) Jean Carlos Rodríguez
- (Dominican Republic) Juan Ángeles
- (Dominican Republic) Juanca
- (Grenada) Jesron Charles
- (Guatemala) Rudy Barrientos
- (Guyana) Kelsey Benjamin
- (Haiti) Bicou Bissainthe
- (Honduras) Selvin Guevara
- (Jamaica) Leonardo Jibbison
- (Jamaica) Tyreek Magee
- (Jamaica) Ricardo McIntosh
- (Mexico) Diego Hernández
- (Mexico) Edgar López
- (Panama) Axel McKenzie
- (Panama) Ángel Orelien
- (Puerto Rico) Alejandro Rabell
- (Saint Kitts and Nevis) Tyrese Shade
- (Saint Vincent and the Grenadines) Trezine Da Souza
- (Saint Vincent and the Grenadines) Gidson Francis
- (Sint Maarten) Jaeremi Drijvers
- (United States) Mark McKenzie
- (United States) Paxton Pomykal

2 goals

- (Antigua and Barbuda) TJ Bramble
- (Antigua and Barbuda) Keon Greene
- (Aruba) Keano Maduro
- (Belize) Carlos Gonzalez
- (Costa Rica) Andrés Gómez
- (Costa Rica) Carlos Villegas
- (Cuba) Christian Flores
- (Cuba) Rivaldo Ibarra
- (Curaçao) Gianni Vandepitte
- (Curaçao) Jaron Vicario
- (El Salvador) Siliazar Henríquez
- (Grenada) Rahim Stephen
- (Guatemala) Óscar Santis
- (Guyana) Thair Britton
- (Haiti) Naël Élysée
- (Honduras) Éverson López
- (Honduras) César Romero
- (Martinique) Axel Raphael
- (Martinique) Bryan Henriol
- (Mexico) Alexis Gutiérrez
- (Mexico) Efraín Orona
- (Mexico) Gilberto Sepúlveda
- (Panama) Ernesto Walker
- (Puerto Rico) Kevin Hernández
- (Puerto Rico) Kevin Montañez
- (Saint Kitts and Nevis) Romario Martin
- (Saint Vincent and the Grenadines) Trivis Fraser
- (Suriname) Rievaldo Doorson
- (Suriname) Roscello Vlijter
- (United States) Brandon Servania

1 goal

- (Antigua and Barbuda) Javorn Benjamin
- (Antigua and Barbuda) Akeem Isaac
- (Barbados) Ray Francis
- (Belize) Dion Cacho
- (Belize) Jonard Castillo
- (Belize) Andir Chi
- (Canada) Theo Bair
- (Canada) Clément Bayiha
- (Canada) Mathieu Choinière
- (Canada) José Hernández
- (Canada) Jordan Perruzza
- (Canada) Adonijah Reid
- (Canada) Steffen Yeates
- (Cayman Islands) Jabari Campbell
- (Cayman Islands) Alexander Clarke-Ramirez
- (Cayman Islands) Mason Duval
- (Cayman Islands) Albertini Holness
- (Cayman Islands) Kion Parchmont
- (Costa Rica) Josué Abarca
- (Costa Rica) Walter Cortés
- (Costa Rica) Alexis Gamboa
- (Costa Rica) Diego Mesén
- (Costa Rica) Jurguens Montenegro
- (Costa Rica) Joshua Navarro
- (Costa Rica) Rashir Parkins
- (Costa Rica) Andy Reyes
- (Cuba) Frank Nodarse
- (Cuba) José Pérez
- (Cuba) Omar Pérez
- (Cuba) Yandri Romero
- (Curaçao) Carlito Fermina
- (Curaçao) Giorney Rojer
- (Curaçao) Meghon Valpoort
- (Curaçao) Luchenthly Vrutaal
- (Dominica) Reon Cuffy
- (Dominican Republic) Brian López
- (Dominican Republic) Sergio Paredes
- (El Salvador) Fernando Clavel
- (El Salvador) Jorge Cruz
- (El Salvador) José Portillo
- (El Salvador) Cristian Rosales
- (El Salvador) Gerson Sánchez
- (Grenada) Leon Braveboy
- (Grenada) Dorrel Pierre
- (Guadeloupe) Mathis Bapaume
- (Guadeloupe) Dylan Laug
- (Guadeloupe) Edrick Virginie-Jovial
- (Guatemala) Carlos Alvarado
- (Guatemala) José Ardon
- (Guatemala) Nery Cifuentes
- (Guatemala) Óscar Mejía
- (Guatemala) Edin Rivas
- (Guyana) Jeremy Garrett
- (Guyana) Chris Macey
- (Haiti) Antonio Borgelin
- (Haiti) Ronaldo Damus
- (Haiti) Delentz Pierre
- (Haiti) McJeffrey Pierre
- (Honduras) Gerson Chávez
- (Honduras) Mariano Álvarez
- (Honduras) Elison Rivas
- (Honduras) Mikel Santos
- (Jamaica) Maliek Howell
- (Mexico) Kevin Álvarez
- (Mexico) Misael Domínguez
- (Mexico) Carlos Gutiérrez
- (Mexico) Adrián Lozano
- (Nicaragua) Estarling Acuña
- (Nicaragua) Alexander Caldera
- (Nicaragua) Eliam Palacios
- (Panama) Maikell Díaz
- (Panama) Carlos Kirton
- (Panama) Jesús West
- (Puerto Rico) Luis Miguel Cosme
- (Puerto Rico) Gerald Díaz
- (Saint Kitts and Nevis) Esquick Nicholls
- (Saint Kitts and Nevis) Dijhorn Simmonds
- (Saint Lucia) Nangee Philip
- (Saint Lucia) Sebastin Ribot
- (Saint Lucia) Aaron Richard
- (Collectivity of Saint Martin) Akim Arrondell
- (Collectivity of Saint Martin) Nolan Freyer
- (Collectivity of Saint Martin) Isais Pagesy
- (Sint Maarten) Leonidas Zion
- (Suriname) Shaquille Cairo
- (Suriname) Ayad Godlieb
- (Suriname) Ferando Hoepel
- (Suriname) Jamilhio Rigters
- (Suriname) Gleofilo Vlijter
- (Suriname) Mgwenze Vola
- (Trinidad and Tobago) Che Benny
- (Trinidad and Tobago) Jabarry Francis
- (Trinidad and Tobago) Judah García
- (Trinidad and Tobago) Nickel Orr
- (Trinidad and Tobago) Jaydon Prowell
- (Trinidad and Tobago) Mark Ramdeen
- (Trinidad and Tobago) John-Paul Rochford
- (Trinidad and Tobago) Kerdell Sween
- (United States) Griffin Dorsey
- (United States) Emanuel Perez
- (United States Virgin Islands) Rakeem Joseph
- (United States Virgin Islands) Ramesses McGuiness

1 own goal

- (Aruba) Mark Jacobs (against Nicaragua)
- (Grenada) Chad Phillip (against Aruba)
- (Guatemala) Carlos Alvarado (against Curaçao)
- (Guyana) Cecil Jackman (against Curaçao)
- (Jamaica) Javain Brown (against Mexico)
- (Martinique) Jean-Claude Michalet (against Panama)
- (Puerto Rico) Nicolás Cardona (against United States)
- (Trinidad and Tobago) Justin Homer (against United States)

== Qualification for international tournaments ==
=== Qualified teams for FIFA U-20 World Cup ===
The following four teams from CONCACAF qualify for the 2019 FIFA U-20 World Cup.

Team	Qualified on	Previous appearances in FIFA U-20 World Cup^{1}
Mexico	16 November 2018	15 (1977, 1979, 1981, 1983, 1985, 1991, 1993, 1997, 1999, 2003, 2007, 2011, 2013, 2015, 2017)
Panama	16 November 2018	5 (2003, 2005, 2007, 2011, 2015)
United States	16 November 2018	15 (1981, 1983, 1987, 1989, 1993, 1997, 1999, 2001, 2003, 2005, 2007, 2009, 2013, 2015, 2017)
Honduras	19 November 2018	7 (1977, 1995, 1999, 2005, 2009, 2015, 2017)

^{1} Bold indicates champions for that year. Italic indicates hosts for that year.

=== Qualified teams for Pan American Games ===
The tournament was used to determine the four teams from CONCACAF which would qualify for the 2019 Pan American Games men's football tournament. The top team from each of the three zones, i.e., Caribbean (CFU), Central American (UNCAF), and North American (NAFU), would qualify, with the fourth team to be determined by CONCACAF at a later date. However, United States declined to participate, so Mexico qualified for the North American berth.

Team	Zone	Qualified on	Previous appearances in Pan American Games^{2}
Jamaica	CFU	10 November 2018	4 (1971, 1975, 1999, 2007)
Panama	UNCAF	19 November 2018	1 (2015)
Mexico	NAFU	2019 (confirmed by CONCACAF)	14 (1955, 1959, **1967**, 1971, **1975**, 1983, 1987, **1991**, 1995, **1999**, 2003, 2007, **2011**, 2015)
Honduras	UNCAF	2019 (confirmed by CONCACAF)	4 (1991, 1995, 1999, 2007)

^{2} Bold indicates champions for that year. Italic indicates hosts for that year.

== Controversy ==
=== Cuban defectors ===
Twelve of the Cuban players (Arturo Hector Godoy, Bruno Manuel Rendon Cardoso, Christopher Yoel Llorente Fernandez, Danny Echeverria Diaz Frank Leidam Nodarse Chavez, Geobel Perez Oquendo, Josue Vega Alvarez, Juan Manuel Andreus Milanes, Omar Perez Ramirez Omar Proenza Calderon, Rivaldo Ibarra Thompson, Rolando Aldahir Oviendo Valdez and Yandri Romero Clark.) opted to stay in United States following the team's exit from the competition.

=== Visa issues ===
Octavio Rodríguez, the assistant coach of the Guatemalan staff team and four players; Carlos Orellana (Guastatoya), Carlos Monterroso (Municipal), Nelso Iván García (Communications) and Luis Francisco Estrada (Siquinalá) were denied visas to participate in the tournament. A further seven players from Honduras were also denied visas.
