= 2020 CONCACAF Men's Olympic Qualifying Championship qualification =

Tournament details
- Host countries: Jamaica (Caribbean Group A); United States Virgin Islands (Caribbean Group B); Cayman Islands (Caribbean Group C); Dominican Republic (Group D)
- Dates: Central America: 17–21 July 2019; Caribbean preliminary: 17–28 July 2019; Caribbean play-in: September 2019
- Teams: 22 (from 1 confederation)

Tournament statistics
- Matches played: 23
- Goals scored: 64 (2.78 per match)

The qualifying competition for the 2020 CONCACAF Men's Olympic Qualifying Championship determined five of the eight teams of the final tournament. Players born on or after 1 January 1997 were eligible to compete in the tournament.

== Teams ==
A total of 25 CONCACAF teams (out of 41) entered Olympic qualifying, with 22 involved in regional qualifiers for the final tournament. The entrants were divided into three zones:

- North American Zone (NAFU): All three teams (Canada, Mexico, and the United States) qualified automatically for the final tournament.
- Central American Zone (UNCAF): Six out of seven teams entered, with three teams qualifying for the final tournament.
- Caribbean Zone (CFU): Sixteen out of 31 teams entered, with two teams qualifying for the final tournament.

Zone	Teams entering Olympic qualifying	Did not enter
North American Zone (NAFU)	**Canada** (Q); **Mexico** (Q); **United States** (Q)	
Central American Zone (UNCAF)	**Costa Rica**; **El Salvador**; Guatemala; **Honduras**; Nicaragua; Panama	Belize
Caribbean Zone (CFU)	Antigua and Barbuda; Barbados; Cayman Islands; Cuba; Dominica; **Dominican Republic**; Grenada; Guyana (W); **Haiti**; Jamaica; Puerto Rico; Saint Kitts and Nevis; Saint Lucia; Suriname (W); Trinidad and Tobago (W); U.S. Virgin Islands	Anguilla (N); Aruba; Bahamas; Bermuda; Bonaire (N); British Virgin Islands; Curaçao (N); French Guiana (N); Guadeloupe (N); Martinique (N); Montserrat (N); Saint Martin (N); Sint Maarten (N); Saint Vincent and the Grenadines; Turks and Caicos Islands (N)

Notes

- Teams in **bold** qualified for the final tournament.
- (N): Not a member of the International Olympic Committee, ineligible for Olympics
- (Q): Qualified automatically for final tournament
- (W): Withdrew after draw

== Draw ==
The draw for the Caribbean preliminary round took place on 17 April 2019, 11:00 EDT (UTC−4), at the CONCACAF Headquarters in Miami. The sixteen teams which entered the Caribbean preliminary round were drawn into four groups of four teams. Based on the FIFA World Rankings (as of 4 April 2019), the sixteen teams were distributed into four pots, with teams in Pot 1 assigned to each group prior to the draw, as follows:

Pot 1	Pot 2	Pot 3	Pot 4
Jamaica (56) (A1); Trinidad and Tobago (93) (B1); Haiti (100) (C1); Antigua and Barbuda (123) (D1)	Saint Kitts and Nevis (135); Suriname (152); Dominican Republic (154); Barbados (161)	Saint Lucia (170); Grenada (172); Cuba (174); Guyana (175)	Dominica (178); Puerto Rico (181); U.S. Virgin Islands (200); Cayman Islands (206)

The matchups of the Caribbean play-in round, played between the four Caribbean preliminary round group winners, were determined as follows:

- Winner Group A v Winner Group D
- Winner Group B v Winner Group C

Each tie was played as a single match, with the higher-ranked team according to the seeding used for the preliminary round draw hosting the match.

No draw was made for the Central American matchups, which were based on the FIFA World Rankings (as of 4 April 2019), as follows:

1. Costa Rica (38)	v	6. Guatemala (143)
2. Honduras (61)	v	5. Nicaragua (129)
3. El Salvador (71)	v	4. Panama (74)

Each tie was played as two-legged home-and-away matches, with the higher-ranked team according to the seeding hosting the second leg.

== Central America ==
The first legs were played on 17 July, and the second legs were played on 21 July 2019. Winners qualified for the 2020 CONCACAF Men's Olympic Qualifying Championship.

Team 1	Agg.	Team 2	1st leg	2nd leg
Guatemala	2–3	Costa Rica	0–3	2–0
Nicaragua	0–5	Honduras	0–2	0–3
Panama	1–3	El Salvador	1–1	0–2

17 July 2019
19:00 UTC−6

Guatemala	0–3	Costa Rica
	Report	Leal 14'; Córdoba 55'; Araya 60'

Estadio Doroteo Guamuch Flores, Guatemala City
Referee: Oliver Vergara (Panama)
21 July 2019
11:00 UTC−6

Costa Rica	0–2	Guatemala
	Report	Ardón 60'; Alvarado 83'

Estadio Alejandro Morera Soto, Alajuela
Referee: Kimbell Ward (Saint Kitts and Nevis)

Costa Rica won 3–2 on aggregate.

17 July 2019
18:00 UTC−6

Nicaragua	0–2	Honduras
	Report	Ingram 20' (o.g.); Pinto 81'

Nicaragua National Football Stadium, Managua
Referee: Drew Fischer (Canada)
21 July 2019
18:00 UTC−6

Honduras	3–0	Nicaragua
Arriaga 67'; Reyes 74', 85'	Report

Estadio Olímpico Metropolitano, San Pedro Sula
Referee: Tristley Bassue (Saint Kitts and Nevis)

Honduras won 5–0 on aggregate.

17 July 2019
20:00 UTC−5

Panama	1–1	El Salvador
Tejada 27'	Report	Ramos 47' (o.g.)

Estadio Rommel Fernández, Panama City
Referee: Bryan López Castellanos (Guatemala)
21 July 2019
15:15 UTC−6

El Salvador	2–0	Panama
Hernández 26' (pen.); Morales 90'	Report

Estadio Cuscatlán, San Salvador
Referee: Fernando Hernández (Mexico)

El Salvador won 3–1 on aggregate.

== Caribbean ==
The Group A, B, and D matches were played between 17–21 July, and the Group C matches were played between 24–28 July 2019. Group winners qualified for the play-in round.

=== Preliminary round ===
==== Group A ====
Matches were played at the Anthony Spaulding Sports Complex, Kingston in Jamaica. All times are local, EST (UTC−5).

Pos	Team	Pld	W	D	L	GF	GA	GD	Pts	Qualification
1	Saint Kitts and Nevis	2	1	1	0	5	1	+4	4	Play-in round
2	Jamaica (H)	2	0	2	0	2	2	0	2	
3	Dominica	2	0	1	1	1	5	−4	1	
4	Guyana	0	0	0	0	0	0	0	0	Withdrew

Source: CONCACAF
Rules for classification: Qualifying stage tiebreakers
(H) Hosts
17 July 2019
18:30

Jamaica	1–1	Dominica
Daley 52'	Report	Jnohope 37'

Anthony Spaulding Sports Complex, Kingston
Referee: Ted Unkel (United States)

19 July 2019
16:00

Dominica	0–4	Saint Kitts and Nevis
	Report	Lake 7', 23'; Mitchum 47'; Terrell 69'

Anthony Spaulding Sports Complex, Kingston
Referee: Nelson Salgado (Honduras)

21 July 2019
18:30

Saint Kitts and Nevis	1–1	Jamaica
Lake 56'	Report	Daley 45'

Anthony Spaulding Sports Complex, Kingston
Referee: Jaime Herrera Bonilla (El Salvador)

==== Group B ====
Matches were played at the Bethlehem Soccer Complex, Saint Croix in United States Virgin Islands. All times are local, AST (UTC−4).

Pos	Team	Pld	W	D	L	GF	GA	GD	Pts	Qualification
1	Barbados	2	2	0	0	6	0	+6	6	Play-in round
2	Cuba	2	1	0	1	3	3	0	3	
3	U.S. Virgin Islands (H)	2	0	0	2	2	8	−6	0	
4	Trinidad and Tobago	0	0	0	0	0	0	0	0	Withdrew

Source: CONCACAF
Rules for classification: Qualifying stage tiebreakers
(H) Hosts
17 July 2019
20:00

U.S. Virgin Islands	2–3	Cuba
Joseph 10'; Kendall 20'	Report	26'; 45'; 70'

Bethlehem Soccer Complex, Saint Croix
Referee: José Raul Rivera Torres (Puerto Rico)

19 July 2019
17:30

Barbados	1–0	Cuba
Trim 70'	Report

Bethlehem Soccer Complex, Saint Croix
Referee: Randy Encarnacion Solano (Dominican Republic)

21 July 2019
17:30

Barbados	5–0	U.S. Virgin Islands
Lorde 12'; Reid-Stephen 30'; Gale 45', 45+2'; Howell (?)	Report

Bethlehem Soccer Complex, Saint Croix
Referee: José Raul Rivera Torres (Puerto Rico)

==== Group C ====
Matches were played at the Truman Bodden Sports Complex, George Town in Cayman Islands. All times are local, EST (UTC−5).

Pos	Team	Pld	W	D	L	GF	GA	GD	Pts	Qualification
1	Haiti	2	1	1	0	4	2	+2	4	Play-in round
2	Grenada	2	1	0	1	1	2	−1	3	
3	Cayman Islands (H)	2	0	1	1	2	3	−1	1	
4	Suriname	0	0	0	0	0	0	0	0	Withdrew

Source: CONCACAF
Rules for classification: Qualifying stage tiebreakers
(H) Hosts
24 July 2019
19:30

Cayman Islands	0–1	Grenada
	Report	Modoo 54'

Truman Bodden Sports Complex, George Town
Referee: Moeth Gaymes (St Vincent & Grenadines)

26 July 2019
19:00

Grenada	0–2	Haiti
	Report	Bissainthe 32' (pen.) (?)

Truman Bodden Sports Complex, George Town
Referee: Trevester Richards (St Kitts & Nevis)

28 July 2019
19:00

Haiti	2–2	Cayman Islands
(?) (?)	Report	(?) (?)

Truman Bodden Sports Complex, George Town
Referee: Moeth Gaymes (St Vincent & Grenadines)

==== Group D ====
Matches were played at the Estadio Panamericano, San Cristóbal in Dominican Republic. All times are local, AST (UTC−4).

Pos	Team	Pld	W	D	L	GF	GA	GD	Pts	Qualification
1	Dominican Republic (H)	3	3	0	0	9	2	+7	9	Play-in round
2	Puerto Rico	3	2	0	1	4	3	+1	6	
3	Saint Lucia	3	1	0	2	5	4	+1	3	
4	Antigua and Barbuda	3	0	0	3	1	10	−9	0	

Source: CONCACAF
Rules for classification: Qualifying stage tiebreakers
(H) Hosts
17 July 2019
14:00

Antigua and Barbuda	1–2	Puerto Rico
42'	Report	K. Hernandez 20'; Rivera 90+3'

Estadio Panamericano, San Cristóbal
Referee: Sherwin Johnson (Guyana)
17 July 2019
16:30

Dominican Republic	3–1	Saint Lucia
Romero 4'; Japa 50'; González 77'	Report	66'

Estadio Panamericano, San Cristóbal
Referee: Reon Radix (Grenada)

19 July 2019
14:00

Saint Lucia	0–1	Puerto Rico
	Report	Díaz 29'

Estadio Panamericano, San Cristóbal
Referee: Johnny Osier (Haiti)
19 July 2019
16:30

Dominican Republic	4–0	Antigua and Barbuda
Romero 17', 27'; Pineda 23'; Ángeles 86'	Report

Estadio Panamericano, San Cristóbal
Referee: Charvis Delsol (Dominica)

21 July 2019
14:00

Saint Lucia	4–0	Antigua and Barbuda
Doxilly 3'; Augustin 44'; Richard 45+1', 62'	Report

Estadio Panamericano, San Cristóbal
Referee: Marcos Brea Despaigne (Cuba)
21 July 2019
16:30

Puerto Rico	1–2	Dominican Republic
Rivera 17'	Report	Reyes 48'; López 63'

Estadio Panamericano, San Cristóbal
Referee: Reon Radix (Grenada)

=== Play-in round ===
The higher ranked teams according to the seeding, Saint Kitts and Nevis and Haiti, each hosted a one-legged elimination match. The winners qualified for the 2020 CONCACAF Men's Olympic Qualifying Championship.

22 September 2019
19:00 UTC−4

Saint Kitts and Nevis	0–2 (a.e.t.)	Dominican Republic
	Report	Vásquez 97'; Romero 102'

Warner Park Sporting Complex, Basseterre

22 September 2019
19:00 UTC−4

Haiti	4–0	Barbados
Joseph 5'; Christophe (?); Clerveaux 59'; Damus 76'	Report

Stade Sylvio Cator, Port-au-Prince
Referee: Juan Gabriel Calderon (Costa Rica)

== Qualified teams ==
The following eight teams qualified for the final tournament.

Team	Zone	Qualified on	Previous appearances in CONCACAF Men's Olympic Qualifying Tournament^{1}
Canada	North America	Automatic	8 (1984, 1992, 1996, 2000, 2004, 2008, 2012, 2015)
Mexico	North America	Automatic	11 (**1964**, **1972**, **1976**, 1988, 1992, **1996**, 2000, **2004**, 2008, **2012**, **2015**)
United States	North America	Automatic	10 (1964, 1972, 1980, 1988, **1992**, 2000, 2004, 2008, 2012, 2015)
Costa Rica	Central America	21 July 2019	6 (1968, **1980**, **1984**, 1996, 2004, 2015)
Honduras	Central America	21 July 2019	6 (1992, **2000**, 2004, **2008**, 2012, 2015)
El Salvador	Central America	21 July 2019	4 (1968, 1988, 1996, 2012)
Dominican Republic	Caribbean	22 September 2019	0 (debut)
Haiti	Caribbean	22 September 2019	2 (2008, 2015)

^{1} Bold indicates champions for that year. Italic indicates hosts for that year.
