= 1990 CONCACAF U-20 Tournament =

Tournament details
- Host country: Guatemala
- Dates: 29 April – 11 May
- Teams: 12
- Venue(s): Estadio Doroteo Guamuch Flores

Final positions
- Champions: Mexico (9th title)
- Runners-up: Trinidad and Tobago
- Third place: United States
- Fourth place: Guatemala

The 1990 CONCACAF Under-20 Championship was held in Guatemala. It also served as qualification for the 1991 FIFA World Youth Championship.

== Qualification ==
Team 1	Agg.	Team 2	1st leg	2nd leg
Costa Rica	9–0	Belize	1–0	8–0

Other qualification matches may have been played.

== Teams ==
The following teams entered the tournament:

Region	Team(s)
Caribbean (CFU)	Barbados; Bermuda; Grenada; Suriname; Trinidad and Tobago
Central America (UNCAF)	Costa Rica; El Salvador; Guatemala (host); Honduras
North America (NAFU)	Canada; Mexico; United States

== Round 1 ==
=== Group 1 ===
Teams	Pld	W	D	L	GF	GA	GD	Pts
Guatemala	2	2	0	0	5	1	+4	4
Suriname	2	1	0	1	2	4	–2	2
Bermuda	2	0	0	2	2	4	–2	0

29 April	Bermuda	1–2	Suriname
1 May	Guatemala	3–0	Suriname
3 May	Guatemala	2–1	Bermuda

=== Group 2 ===
Teams	Pld	W	D	L	GF	GA	GD	Pts
Trinidad and Tobago	2	1	1	0	3	1	+2	3
Canada	2	1	1	0	1	0	+1	3
El Salvador	2	0	0	2	1	4	–3	0

30 April	Canada	0–0	Trinidad and Tobago
2 May	El Salvador	1–3	Trinidad and Tobago
4 May	El Salvador	0–1	Canada

=== Group 3 ===
Teams	Pld	W	D	L	GF	GA	GD	Pts
United States	2	2	0	0	5	0	+5	4
Costa Rica	2	1	0	1	2	3	–1	2
Barbados	2	0	0	2	1	5	–4	0

29 April	United States	2–0	Costa Rica
1 May	Costa Rica	2–1	Barbados
3 May	Barbados	0–3	United States

=== Group 4 ===
Teams	Pld	W	D	L	GF	GA	GD	Pts
Mexico	2	2	0	0	9	0	+9	4
Honduras	2	1	0	1	3	4	–1	2
Grenada	2	0	0	2	1	9	–8	0

30 April	Mexico	6–0	Grenada
2 May	Honduras	3–1	Grenada
4 May	Honduras	0–3	Mexico

== Final round ==
Teams	Pld	W	D	L	GF	GA	GD	Pts
Mexico	3	3	0	0	8	2	+6	6
Trinidad and Tobago	3	2	0	1	4	3	+1	4
United States	3	1	0	2	5	5	0	2
Guatemala	3	0	0	3	2	9	–7	0

5 May	Guatemala	1–4	United States
6 May	Mexico	2–1	Trinidad and Tobago
8 May	United States	0–1	Trinidad and Tobago
9 May	Guatemala	0–3	Mexico
11 May	Guatemala	1–2	Trinidad and Tobago
	United States	1–3	Mexico

1990 CONCACAF U-20 Championship

Mexico
Ninth title

== Qualification to World Youth Championship ==
The two best performing teams qualified for the 1991 FIFA World Youth Championship.

- Mexico
- Trinidad and Tobago
