= TJ Bramble =

Antigua and Barbuda footballer (b. 2001)

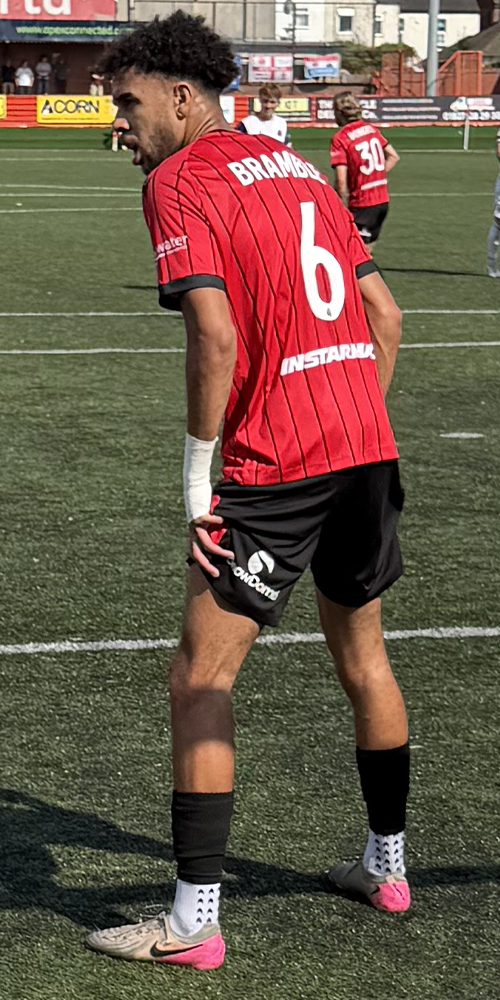
- Bramble playing for Tamworth in August 2026

Personal information
- Full name: Thomas-James Everton Bramble
- Date of birth: 9 May 2001 (age 25)
- Place of birth: Dartford, England
- Height: 1.87 m (6 ft 2 in)
- Position: Midfielder

Team information
- Current team: Tamworth
- Number: 6

Youth career
- Gillingham

Senior career*
Years	Team	Apps	(Gls)
2019–2020	Gillingham	0	(0)
2019	→ Deal Town (loan)	4	(0)
2019–2020	→ East Grinstead Town (loan)	7	(2)
2020	→ Sittingbourne (loan)	5	(0)
2020–2022	Dover Athletic	34	(2)
2023	Chelmsford City	0	(0)
2023–2025	Welling United	51	(3)
2025–2026	Maidstone United	46	(4)
2026–	Tamworth	6	(1)

International career^{‡}
2018	Antigua and Barbuda U20	5	(2)
2018–	Antigua and Barbuda	20	(2)
- * Club domestic league appearances and goals as of 22:00, 9 September 2026 (UTC) ‡ National team caps and goals as of 16:34, 1 May 2026 (UTC)

Thomas-James Everton "TJ" Bramble (born 9 May 2001) is a professional footballer who plays as a midfielder for National League club Tamworth. Born in England, he represents Antigua and Barbuda at international level.

== Club career ==
=== Gillingham ===
Bramble began his career as a youth team player for Gillingham. In February 2019, he joined Deal Town on a 28-day work experience agreement. Bramble signed his first professional contract with Gillingham in May 2019. On 1 November 2019, he joined East Grinstead Town on loan. He played seven games for the club and scored two goals.

On 22 February 2020, Bramble joined Sittingbourne on loan. He was released by Gillingham in June 2020 without ever having played for the first team.

=== Dover Athletic ===
On 27 August 2020, Bramble signed for National League club Dover Athletic. He made his club debut on the opening day of the season in a 1–0 victory over Notts County. On 24 October 2020, Bramble scored his first goal for the club, the final goal in a 3–3 draw with Yeovil Town in the FA Cup; Dover lost the tie on penalties. Bramble was released by the club at the end of the 2021–22 season following relegation, being offered the chance to come back for pre-season and prove his fitness.

=== Chelmsford City ===
Following his release from Dover, Bramble went on trial at Leyton Orient and Barnsley. In March 2023, Bramble signed for National League South side Chelmsford City. On 28 March 2023, Bramble made his debut for the club in a 1–1 Tolleshunt D'Arcy Memorial Cup draw against Heybridge Swifts.

=== Welling United ===
In July 2023, Bramble signed for Welling United following a successful trial.

=== Maidstone United ===
In June 2025, Bramble returned to the National League South following Welling United's relegation, joining Maidstone United. He was offered a new contract at the end of the 2025–26 season.

=== Tamworth ===
Bramble was announced as a new signing for National League side Tamworth on 23 June 2026. On 8 August 2026, Bramble made his debut for Tamworth, on the opening day of the 2026–27 season, playing in a 3–3 draw away at Boreham Wood. He scored his first goal for Tamworth in an away fixture against FC Halifax Town on 22 August 2026, scoring a 76th minute consolation goal in a 4–1 defeat.

== International career ==
In March 2018, Bramble was called up to the Antigua and Barbuda team for a pair of friendlies against Bermuda and Jamaica. He made his debut in a 3–2 win over Bermuda on 22 March.

Later the same year he featured for the "Benna Boys" in the 2018 CONCACAF U-20 Championship in the United States, scoring in a win over Sint Maarten and a loss to Honduras in the group stage.

== Career statistics ==
=== Club ===
As of match played 9 September 2026

Appearances and goals by club, season and competition
Club	Season	League			FA Cup		League Cup		Other		Total	
Club	Season	Division	Apps	Goals	Apps	Goals	Apps	Goals	Apps	Goals	Apps	Goals
Gillingham	2018–19	League One	0	0	0	0	0	0	0	0	0	0
Gillingham	2019–20	League One	0	0	0	0	0	0	0	0	0	0
Gillingham	Total		0	0	0	0	0	0	0	0	0	0
Deal Town (loan)	2018–19	Southern Counties East Premier Division	4	0	—		—		0	0	4	0
East Grinstead Town (loan)	2019–20	Isthmian League South East Division	7	2	0	0	—		0	0	7	2
Sittingbourne (loan)	2019–20	Isthmian League South East Division	5	0	—		—		0	0	5	0
Dover Athletic	2020–21 (Note: Dover Athletic's results were expunged in March 2021 after the club had failed to meet fixture obligations)	National League	12	1	1	1	—		1 (Note: Appearance(s) in FA Trophy)	0	14	2
Dover Athletic	2021–22	National League	22	1	2	0	—		0	0	24	1
Dover Athletic	Total		34	2	3	1	0	0	1	0	38	3
Welling United	2023–24	National League South	17	2	3	0	—		3	0	23	2
Welling United	2024–25	National League South	34	1	1	0	—		0	0	35	1
Welling United	Total		51	3	4	0	0	0	3	0	58	3
Maidstone United	2025–26	National League South	46	4	1	0	—		1	0	48	4
Tamworth	2026–27	National League	6	1	0	0	—		0	0	6	1
Career total			153	12	8	1	0	0	5	0	166	13

=== International ===
Scores and results list Antigua and Barbuda's goal tally first, score column indicates score after each Bramble goal.

List of international goals scored by TJ Bramble
No.	Date	Venue	Opponent	Score	Result	Competition
1	14 October 2023	Thomas Robinson Stadium, Nassau, Bahamas	Bahamas	3–0	4–1	2023–24 CONCACAF Nations League B
2	17 October 2023	ABFA Technical Center, Piggots, Antigua and Barbuda	Bahamas	2–1	2–2	2023–24 CONCACAF Nations League B
