= Honduras national under-20 football team =

Honduras U-20
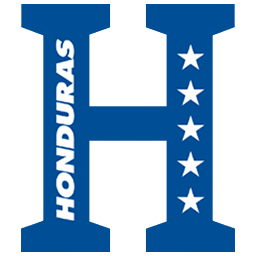
- Nickname: La Mini H
- Association: FENAFUTH
- Confederation: CONCACAF
- Head coach: Luis Alvarado
- Captain: Aaron Zúñiga
- FIFA code: HON
First colours	Second colours

First international
- Costa Rica 1–2 Honduras (Panama; 7 March 1962)

Biggest win
- Sint Maarten 0–12 Honduras (Bradenton, Florida, United States; 3 November 2018)

Biggest defeat
- Norway 12–0 Honduras (Lublin, Poland; 30 May 2019)

FIFA U-20 World Cup
- Appearances: 9 (first in 1977)
- Best result: Group stage (1977, 1995, 1999, 2005, 2009, 2015, 2017, 2019, 2023)

CONCACAF Under-20 Championship
- Appearances: 24 (first in 1962)
- Best result: Winner (1982, 1994)

The Honduras national under-20 football team is the national under-20 association football team of Honduras. They have made nine FIFA U-20 World Cup appearances.

== Tournament history ==
FIFA U-20 World Cup
Year	P	W	T	L	F	A	D	Pts	Finish
(Tunisia) 1977	3	2	0	1	3	1	+2	4	Group phase
(Japan) 1979 ↓ (Australia) 1993	Did not qualify								
(Qatar) 1995	3	0	0	3	5	14	–9	0	Group phase
(Malaysia) 1997	Did not qualify								
(Nigeria) 1999	3	0	0	3	4	10	–6	0	Group phase
(Argentina) 2001 ↓ (United Arab Emirates) 2003	Did not qualify								
(Netherlands) 2005	3	0	0	3	0	15	–15	0	Group phase
(Canada) 2007	Did not qualify								
(Egypt) 2009	3	1	0	2	3	3	0	3	Group phase
(Colombia) 2011 ↓ (Turkey) 2013	Did not qualify								
(New Zealand) 2015	3	1	0	2	5	11	−6	3	Group phase
(South Korea) 2017	3	1	0	2	3	6	−3	3	Group phase
(Poland) 2019	3	0	0	3	0	19	–19	0	Group phase
(Argentina) 2023	3	0	1	2	4	7	–3	1	Group phase
(Chile) 2025 ↓ (Azerbaijan) (Uzbekistan) 2027	Did not qualify								
(Armenia) (Georgia (country)) 2029	To be determined								
Totals	27	5	1	21	27	86	–59	14	—
CONCACAF Under-20 Championship
Year	P	W	T	L	F	A	D	Pts	Finish
(Panama) 1962	3	1	1	1	3	4	–1	3	Group phase
(Guatemala) 1964	6	2	1	3	9	7	+2	5	Runners-up
(Cuba) 1970 ↓ (Canada) 1974	Did not qualify								
(Puerto Rico) 1976	8	7	1	0	24	3	+21	15	Runners-up
(Honduras) 1978	7	6	0	1	14	3	+11	12	Third place
(United States) 1980	5	3	2	0	12	2	+10	8	Semifinalist
(Guatemala) 1982	7	6	1	0	13	4	+9	13	Champions
(Trinidad and Tobago) 1984	6	4	0	2	8	8	0	8	Second round
(Trinidad and Tobago) 1986	Did not qualify								
(Guatemala) 1988	2	0	0	2	2	5	–3	0	Qualifying round
(Guatemala) 1990	2	1	0	1	3	4	–1	2	Group phase
(Canada) 1992	6	2	2	2	6	6	0	6	Fourth
(Honduras) 1994	6	6	0	0	18	6	+12	18	Champions
(Mexico) 1996	3	1	1	1	3	1	+2	4	Group phase
(Guatemala) (Trinidad and Tobago) 1998	5	3	1	1	10	6	+4	10	2nd Group A
(Canada) (Trinidad and Tobago) 2001	7	2	0	5	4	9	–5	6	4th Group B
(Panama) (United States) 2003	4	2	0	2	10	5	+5	6	Qualifying round
(Honduras) (United States) 2005	3	2	0	1	6	3	+3	6	2nd Group B
(Panama) (Mexico) 2007	2	1	1	0	6	5	+1	4	Qualifying round
(Trinidad and Tobago) 2009	10	6	3	1	26	9	+19	15	Third place
(Guatemala) 2011	5	4	0	1	12	4	+8	12	Quarterfinalist
(Mexico) 2013	2	0	1	1	0	1	–1	1	Qualifying round
(Jamaica) 2015	12	7	3	2	26	16	+10	24	Playoff winner
(Costa Rica) 2017	10	6	3	1	16	7	+9	21	Runners-up
(United States) 2018	7	5	1	1	31	7	+24	16	Qualification stage
(Honduras) 2022	6	5	0	1	15	5	+10		Semifinalist
Totals	134	82	22	30	276	130	+147	215	—
UNCAF U-19 Tournament
Year	P	W	T	L	F	A	D	Pts	Finish
(Honduras) 2018	6	2	1	3	11	11	0	7	4th
Totals	6	2	1	3	11	11	0	7	—

== Players ==
=== Current squad ===
The following players were named in the squad for the 2023 FIFA U-20 World Cup, to be played in May-June 2023.

Caps and goals correct as of 10 May 2023, after the match against Uruguay.

No.	Pos.	Player	Date of birth (age)	Caps	Goals	Club
	GK	Juergen García	28 January 2005 (age 21)	8	0	(National Autonomous Federation of Football of Honduras) Lone
	GK	Medardo Laínez	4 February 2004 (age 22)	0	0	(National Autonomous Federation of Football of Honduras) Real España
	GK	José Valdez	17 April 2003 (age 23)	0	0	(National Autonomous Federation of Football of Honduras) Vida
	DF	Geremy Rodas	19 March 2004 (age 22)	7	1	(United States Soccer Federation) Minnesota United FC
	DF	Aaron Zúñiga	4 November 2003 (age 22)	7	1	(National Autonomous Federation of Football of Honduras) Real España
	DF	Javier Arriaga	1 August 2004 (age 22)	7	0	(National Autonomous Federation of Football of Honduras) Marathón
	DF	Darlin Mencia	9 April 2003 (age 23)	2	0	(National Autonomous Federation of Football of Honduras) Real España
	DF	Anfronit Tatum	2 June 2005 (age 21)	2	0	(National Autonomous Federation of Football of Honduras) Real España
	DF	Félix García	2 February 2004 (age 22)	1	1	(National Autonomous Federation of Football of Honduras) Olimpia
	DF	Julián Martínez	1 December 2003 (age 22)	1	0	(National Autonomous Federation of Football of Honduras) Olimpia
	MF	Tomás Sorto	16 January 2003 (age 23)	8	1	(National Autonomous Federation of Football of Honduras) Honduras Progreso
	MF	Isaac Castillo	24 May 2003 (age 23)	7	1	(National Autonomous Federation of Football of Honduras) Marathón
	MF	Odín Ramos	16 February 2004 (age 22)	7	1	(National Autonomous Federation of Football of Honduras) Marathón
	MF	Heber Núñez	28 September 2003 (age 23)	5	0	(National Autonomous Federation of Football of Honduras) Lone
	MF	David Ruiz	8 February 2004 (age 22)	0	0	(United States Soccer Federation) Inter Miami CF
	FW	Marco Aceituno	28 December 2003 (age 22)	8	7	(National Autonomous Federation of Football of Honduras) Real España
	FW	Exon Arzú	19 May 2004 (age 22)	7	0	(National Autonomous Federation of Football of Honduras) Real España
	FW	Kolton Kelly	12 February 2004 (age 22)	7	0	(National Autonomous Federation of Football of Honduras) Victoria
	FW	Jefryn Macías	2 January 2004 (age 22)	6	3	(National Autonomous Federation of Football of Honduras) UPNFM
	FW	Maynor Arzú	16 November 2003 (age 22)	0	0	(National Autonomous Federation of Football of Honduras) Real Sociedad
	FW	Daniel Carter	12 September 2003 (age 23)	0	0	(National Autonomous Federation of Football of Honduras) Real España

=== Recent call-ups ===
The following players have previously been called up to the Honduras under-20 squad in the last 12 months and remain eligible for selection.

Pos.	Player	Date of birth (age)	Caps	Goals	Club	Latest call-up

== Top goalscorers ==
Rank	Player	Year(s)	U-20 Goals
1	Bryan Róchez	2013–2015	9
2	Marco Aceituno	2022–	6
3	Alberth Elis	2014–2015	4
4	José Güity	2005	3
4	Mario Martínez	2009	3
4	Roger Rojas	2009	3
4	Anthony Lozano	2011	3

== List of coaches ==
List of managers since 1956 to present:

- 1956 — José Santos
- 1958–62 — Mario Griffin
- 1964 — Hermes Bertrand
- 1976–77 — Rodolfo Godoy
- 1978 — Ángel Rodríguez
- 1980 — Carlos Cruz
- 1982 — Néstor Matamala
- 1984 — Mario Griffin
- 1988 — Carlos Suazo
- 1990 — Jorge Cabrera
- 1991 — Dennis Allen
- 1992 — José Ortiz
- 1994–95 — Luis Paz
- 1996 — Carlos Cruz
- 1998–99 — Rubén Gifarro
- 1999 — José Herrera
- 2000 — Marco Calderón
- 2001 — Hernán García
- 2002 — Óscar Salgado
- 2004–06 — Rubén Gifarro
- 2007–08 — Miguel Escalante
- 2008–09 — Emilio Umanzor
- 2010–14 — Javier Padilla
- 2014–15 — Jorge Jiménez
- 2016–19 — Carlos Tábora
- 2022–Present — Luis Alvarado

== Honours ==
- CONCACAF Under-20 Championship
  - Winners (2): 1982, 1994
  - Runners-up (3): 1964, 1976, 2017
  - 3rd place (2): 1978, 2009

== Head-to-head record ==
The following table shows Honduras' head-to-head record in the FIFA U-20 World Cup.

Opponent	Pld	W	D	L	GF	GA	GD	Win %
Argentina	1	0	0	1	2	4	−2	0.00
Brazil	1	0	0	1	0	3	−3	0.00
Chile	1	0	0	1	0	7	−7	0.00
Fiji	1	0	0	1	0	3	−3	0.00
France	2	0	0	2	1	6	−5	0.00
Gambia	1	0	0	1	1	2	−1	0.00
Germany	1	0	0	1	1	5	−4	0.00
Hungary	2	2	0	0	5	0	+5	100.00
Morocco	2	1	0	1	1	5	−4	50.00
New Zealand	2	0	0	2	1	8	−7	0.00
Netherlands	1	0	0	1	1	7	−6	0.00
Norway	1	0	0	1	0	12	−12	0.00
Portugal	1	0	0	1	2	3	−1	0.00
South Africa	1	0	0	1	0	2	−2	0.00
South Korea	1	0	1	0	2	2	+0	0.00
Spain	2	0	0	2	1	6	−5	0.00
United Arab Emirates	1	0	0	1	0	1	−1	0.00
Uruguay	2	0	0	2	0	3	−3	0.00
Uzbekistan	1	1	0	0	4	3	+1	100.00
Vietnam	1	1	0	0	2	0	+2	100.00
Zambia	1	0	0	1	3	4	−1	0.00
Total	27	5	1	21	27	86	−59	18.52
