= 1980 CONCACAF U-20 Tournament =

Tournament details
- Host country: United States
- Dates: 1–17 August
- Teams: 18

Final positions
- Champions: Mexico (7th title)
- Runners-up: United States

The 1980 CONCACAF Under-20 Championship was held in the United States. It also served as qualification for the 1981 FIFA World Youth Championship.

Haiti were initially set to host the tournament but later withdrew.

== Teams ==
The following teams entered the tournament:

Region	Team(s)
Caribbean (CFU)	Antigua and Barbuda; Barbados; Bermuda; Cuba; Dominican Republic; Grenada; Jamaica; Netherlands Antilles; Puerto Rico; Suriname; Trinidad and Tobago

Region	Team(s)
Central America (UNCAF)	Costa Rica; El Salvador; Guatemala; Honduras
North America (NAFU)	Canada; Mexico; United States (host)

== Group stage ==
=== Group Los Angeles ===
Teams	Pld	W	D	L	GF	GA	GD	Pts
Mexico	3	2	1	0	7	1	+6	5
Cuba	3	1	1	1	3	3	0	3
Costa Rica	3	1	0	2	5	7	–2	2
Dominican Republic	3	1	0	2	2	6	–4	2

1 August	Costa Rica	3–1	Cuba
	Mexico	3–0	Dominican Republic
3 August	Mexico	0–0	Cuba
5 August	Dominican Republic	2–1	Costa Rica
7 August	Cuba	2–0	Dominican Republic
9 August	Mexico	4–1	Costa Rica

=== Group Dallas ===
In this group, Puerto Rico were disqualified for using non eligible players.

Teams	Pld	W	D	L	GF	GA	GD	Pts
Canada	3	1	2	0	2	1	+1	4
Guatemala	3	0	3	0	1	1	0	3
Jamaica	3	0	3	0	0	0	0	3
Trinidad and Tobago	3	0	2	1	2	3	–1	2
Puerto Rico	Disqualified							

1 August	Jamaica	0–0	Trinidad and Tobago
	Canada	~~1–0~~	Puerto Rico
3 August	Canada	0–0	Guatemala
	Trinidad and Tobago	~~2–1~~	Puerto Rico
5 August	Puerto Rico	~~1–1~~	Jamaica
	Trinidad and Tobago	1–1	Guatemala
7 August	Canada	2–1	Trinidad and Tobago
	Guatemala	0–0	Jamaica
9 August	Canada	0–0	Jamaica
	Guatemala	not played	Puerto Rico

=== Group Edwardsville ===
Teams	Pld	W	D	L	GF	GA	GD	Pts
Honduras	3	2	1	0	4	1	+3	5
Bermuda	3	2	0	1	8	5	+3	4
Suriname	3	1	0	2	4	2	+2	2
Grenada	3	0	1	2	2	10	–8	1

5 August	Suriname	4–0	Grenada
	Honduras	3–1	Bermuda
7 August	Bermuda	1–0	Suriname
	Honduras	0–0	Grenada
9 August	Bermuda	6–2	Grenada
	Honduras	1–0	Suriname

=== Group Princeton ===
Teams	Pld	W	D	L	GF	GA	GD	Pts
United States	4	4	0	0	13	1	+12	8
Netherlands Antilles	4	3	0	1	8	6	+2	6
El Salvador	4	2	0	2	9	4	+5	4
Antigua and Barbuda	4	1	0	3	2	11	–9	2
Barbados	4	0	0	4	2	12	–10	0

1 August	United States	5–0	Barbados
	El Salvador	5–0	Antigua and Barbuda
3 August	United States	3–0	Netherlands Antilles
	El Salvador	3–0	Barbados
5 August	Antigua and Barbuda	1–0	Barbados
	Netherlands Antilles	2–1	El Salvador
7 August	United States	2–0	El Salvador
	Netherlands Antilles	3–0	Antigua and Barbuda
9 August	United States	3–1	Antigua and Barbuda
	Netherlands Antilles	3–2	Barbados

== Quarterfinals ==
12 August 1980

Canada	3 – 0	Cuba

Los Angeles, California
12 August 1980

Mexico	2 – 0	Guatemala

Los Angeles, California
12 August 1980

Honduras	8 – 1	Netherlands Antilles

Washington DC, District of Columbia
12 August 1980

United States	2 – 1	Bermuda

Washington DC, District of Columbia

== Semifinals ==
15 August 1980

Mexico	1 – 1	Canada
Penalties
	4 – 3

Washington DC, District of Columbia
15 August 1980

United States	0 – 0	Honduras
Penalties
	9 – 8

Washington DC, District of Columbia

== Final ==
17 August 1980

United States	0 – 2	Mexico

Giants Stadium, East Rutherford, New Jersey

1980 CONCACAF U-20 Championship

Mexico
Seventh title

== Qualification to World Youth Championship ==
The two best performing teams qualified for the 1981 FIFA World Youth Championship.

- Mexico
- United States
