= Jaeremi Drijvers =

Sint Maarten footballer

Personal information
- Date of birth: 12 November 1999 (age 27)
- Place of birth: Philipsburg, Sint Maarten
- Height: 1.79 m (5 ft 10 1/2 in)
- Position: Centre forward

Team information
- Current team: VV Gestel

Youth career
- 2015–2018: MPC

Senior career*
Years	Team	Apps	(Gls)
2017	Funmakers	8	(10)
2018	Woenselse Boys		
2018–2019	SV Red-White Veldhoven		
2019–2020	VV WODAN		
2021–	VV Gestel		

International career^{‡}
2018	Sint Maarten U20	4	(3)
2019–	Sint Maarten	5	(5)
- * Club domestic league appearances and goals ‡ National team caps and goals as of 13 May 2025 (UTC)

Jaeremi Drijvers (born 12 November 1999) is a Sint Maartener footballer who plays for Dutch club VV Gestel and the Sint Maarten national team.

== Youth career ==
As a youth Drijvers played for Milton Peters College and was one of the most prolific scorers in the Sint Maarten Soccer Association high school league in 2015. As a senior in 2018, his team won the league championship while Drijvers was the league's top scorer.

== Club career ==
Drijvers played club football in the Netherlands with Woenselse Boys and SV Red-White Veldhoven before joining VV WODAN in May 2019. That September he scored as the team put in a dominant performance against VV Hulsel and a victory over ZSC Westerhoven. By 2021 he had returned to the Netherlands, joining VV Gestel. He scored the club's game-winning goal in a 3–2 victory over Wilhelmina Boys in Week 2 of the season.

== International career ==
In summer 2018 Drijvers represented Sint Maarten in the 2018 CONCACAF U-20 Championship. He went on to score three goals in four appearances. His goals came against Antigua and Barbuda, Belize, and the Dominican Republic.

In May 2018 Drijvers was called up for an unofficial friendly against Saint Barthélemy. Despite Drijvers scoring a hattrick, Sint Maarten were defeated 3–5 after conceding three penalty kicks within the final ten minutes of the match. He went on to make his official senior international debut on 25 July 2018 in a friendly against the British Virgin Islands. He scored his first two senior goals in the eventual 2–3 defeat. He was soon after included in Sint Maarten's roster for 2019–20 CONCACAF Nations League qualifying.

=== International goals ===
Scores and results list Sint Maarten's goal tally first.

No.	Date	Venue	Opponent	Score	Result	Competition
1.	26 May 2018	Stade de Saint-Jean, Saint-Jean, Saint Barthélemy	Saint Barthélemy	1–0	3–5	Friendly
2.	26 May 2018	Stade de Saint-Jean, Saint-Jean, Saint Barthélemy	Saint Barthélemy	2–0	3–5	Friendly
3.	26 May 2018	Stade de Saint-Jean, Saint-Jean, Saint Barthélemy	Saint Barthélemy	3–1	3–5	Friendly
4.	25 July 2018	Raoul Illidge Sports Complex, Philipsburg, Sint Maarten	British Virgin Islands	1–2	2–3	Friendly
5.	25 July 2018	Raoul Illidge Sports Complex, Philipsburg, Sint Maarten	British Virgin Islands	2–2	2–3	Friendly
Last updated 3 November 2021

=== International career statistics ===
As of match played 14 October 2019.

Sint Maarten national team
Year	Apps	Goals
2018	5	5
Total	5	5

=== Youth international goals ===
Scores and results list Sint Maarten's goal tally first.

No.	Date	Venue	Opponent	Score	Result	Competition
1.	1 November 2018	IMG Academy, Bradenton, Florida, United States	Antigua and Barbuda	1–2	1–6	2018 CONCACAF U-20 Championship
2.	5 November 2018	IMG Academy, Bradenton, Florida, United States	Belize	2–4	2–4	2018 CONCACAF U-20 Championship
3.	7 November 2018	IMG Academy, Bradenton, Florida, United States	Dominican Republic	1–12	1–12	2018 CONCACAF U-20 Championship
Last updated 3 November 2021

== Athletics ==
Drijvers has also represented Sint Maarten in athletics at the CARIFTA Games.
