= Juan Pablo Torres (soccer) =

American soccer player

Personal information
- Full name: Juan Pablo Torres
- Date of birth: July 26, 1999 (age 27)
- Place of birth: Lilburn, Georgia, United States
- Height: 5 ft 8 in (1.73 m)
- Position: Midfielder

Youth career
- Georgia United

Senior career*
Years	Team	Apps	(Gls)
2017–2019	Lokeren	2	(0)
2019–2021	New York City FC	3	(0)
2021	→ Austin Bold (loan)	28	(2)
2022	Rio Grande Valley FC	29	(3)
2023	Hartford Athletic	27	(2)

International career^{‡}
2015	United States U16	4	(0)
2017	United States U18	2	(0)
2018–2019	United States U20	7	(4)
- * Club domestic league appearances and goals as of October 18, 2023 ‡ National team caps and goals as of November 16, 2018

Juan Pablo Torres (born July 26, 1999) is an American professional soccer player who plays as a midfielder and is a free agent.

== Club career ==
Torres played for academy club, Georgia United in his native state. On July 26, 2017, he signed his first professional contract with Belgian first tier team, Lokeren. On August 26, 2017, Torres made his professional debut, when he replaced Koen Persoons in the 90th minute of the match against K.A.S. Eupen.

On January 26, 2019, Torres returned to the United States, signing for Major League Soccer side New York City FC.

On March 8, 2021, Torres was loaned out to USL Championship club Austin Bold for the 2021 season.

Following the 2021 season, New York City opted to decline their contract option on Torres.

On February 14, 2022, Torres signed with USL Championship side Rio Grande Valley FC.

On April 21, 2023, Torres joined USL Championship side Hartford Athletic for their 2023 season.

== International career ==
Torres was born in the United States to Colombian parents. Torres was called for several US Youth Teams. He was capped seven times with the U15 team and four times with the U16 and U18 teams.

On October 23, 2018, Torres was included by coach Tab Ramos in the 20-player roster chosen to represent the United States U20 team at the 2018 CONCACAF U-20 Championship where the team finished first and qualified for the 2019 FIFA U-20 World Cup. Torres performed well in the tournament and scored four goals.

== Career statistics ==
=== Club ===
As of match played November 2, 2020

Appearances and goals by club, season and competition
Club	Season	League			National cup		Continental		Other		Total	
Club	Season	Division	Apps	Goals	Apps	Goals	Apps	Goals	Apps	Goals	Apps	Goals
Lokeren	2017–18	Belgian First Division A	2	0	0	0	—		—		2	0
Lokeren	2018–19	Belgian First Division A	0	0	0	0	—		—		0	0
Lokeren	Total		2	0	0	0	0	0	0	0	2	0
New York City	2019	MLS	1	0	3	0	—		0	0	4	0
New York City	2020	MLS	2	0	—		0	0	0	0	2	0
New York City	Total		3	0	3	0	0	0	0	0	6	0
Career total			5	0	3	0	0	0	0	0	8	0

== Honors ==
United States U20

- CONCACAF U-20 Championship: 2018
