= Gerson Chávez =

Professional footballer (born 2000)

Personal information
- Full name: Gerson Aldaír Chávez Suazo
- Date of birth: 31 January 2000 (age 26)
- Place of birth: La Ceiba, Honduras
- Height: 1.80 m (5 ft 11 in)
- Position: Defensive midfielder

Team information
- Current team: Chiquimulilla

Youth career
- –2017: Real España

Senior career*
Years	Team	Apps	(Gls)
2017–2023	Real España	79	(1)
2021	→ LA Galaxy II (loan)	2	(0)
2023	→ Vida (loan)	13	(0)
2024–2025	Marathón	27	(0)
2025–2026	Antigua	20	(0)
2026–	Chiquimulilla	0	(0)

International career^{‡}
2017	Honduras U17	9	(0)
2018–2019	Honduras U20	9	(1)
2018	Honduras U21	3	(0)
2022–	Honduras	1	(0)
- * Club domestic league appearances and goals as of 19 March 2026 ‡ National team caps and goals as of 29 December 2021

Gerson Aldaír Chávez Suazo (born 31 January 2000) is a professional footballer who plays as a defensive midfielder for Liga Primera División club Chiquimulilla, and the Honduras national team.

== Career ==
Chávez graduated from the in 2017, making his debut for the club as a 77th-minute substitute during a 2–0 win over Juticalpa on 7 December 2017.

On 13 August 2021, Chávez moved on loan to USL Championship side LA Galaxy II. He made two appearances for the team before returning to Real España at the end of the season.

== International career ==
Chávez has represented Honduras at under-17, under-20 and under-21 level, including at the 2017 FIFA U-17 World Cup in India 2017 and in the 2019 FIFA U-20 World Cup held in Poland 2019.

== Honours ==
Real España

- Honduran Liga Nacional: Apertura 2017
