= Rudy Barrientos =

Guatemalan footballer (born 1999)

Personal information
- Full name: Rudy Ronaldo Barrientos Reyes
- Date of birth: 1 March 1999 (age 27)
- Place of birth: Morales, Guatemala
- Height: 1.75 m (5 ft 9 in)
- Position: Midfielder

Team information
- Current team: Municipal
- Number: 26

Youth career
- 2016–2017: Zacapa
- 2017: Guastatoya

Senior career*
Years	Team	Apps	(Gls)
2017–2019	Guastatoya	38	(2)
2019–	Municipal	222	(17)

International career^{‡}
2018	Guatemala U20	4	(3)
2019	Guatemala U23	3	(1)
2019–	Guatemala	18	(2)
- * Club domestic league appearances and goals as of 18 May 2025 ‡ National team caps and goals as of 11 June 2022

Rudy Ronaldo Barrientos Reyes (born 1 March 1999) is a Guatemalan professional footballer who plays as a midfielder for Liga Guate club Municipal and the Guatemala national team.

== Club career ==
=== Guastatoya ===
A former academy player of Deportivo Zacapa, Barrientos joined Guastatoya in 2015. He made his senior debut for the club on 26 February 2017 in a goalless draw against Malacateco.

=== Municipal ===
In June 2019, Barrientos joined Municipal. He was under a training contract with Guastatoya at that time and the signing was made without their knowledge. Guastatoya later sued both Municipal and Barrientos in National Football Federation of Guatemala.

== International career ==
=== Youth ===
Barrientos is a former Guatemalan youth international. He was captain of national under-20 team at 2018 CONCACAF U-20 Championship. He was also part of under-23 team at 2019 Toulon Tournament.

=== Senior ===
Barrientos made his senior team debut for Guatemala on 17 November 2019 in a 5–0 CONCACAF Nations League win against Puerto Rico. He scored his first international goal four days later in a 8–0 friendly win against Antigua and Barbuda.

== Honours ==
Guastatoya

- Liga Nacional de Guatemala: Clausura 2018, Apertura 2018

Municipal

- Liga Nacional de Guatemala: Apertura 2019, Clausura 2024

== Career statistics ==
=== Club ===
As of 13 March 2021

Club	Season	League			Cup		Continental		Other		Total	
Club	Season	Division	Apps	Goals	Apps	Goals	Apps	Goals	Apps	Goals	Apps	Goals
Guastatoya	2016–17	Liga Nacional de Guatemala	5	0	—		—		0	0	5	0
Guastatoya	2017–18	Liga Nacional de Guatemala	13	0	—		—		1 (Note: Appearance(s) in Apertura playoffs.)	0	14	0
Guastatoya	2018–19	Liga Nacional de Guatemala	19	2	2	1	0	0	0	0	21	3
Guastatoya	Total		37	2	2	1	0	0	1	0	40	3
Municipal	2019–20	Liga Nacional de Guatemala	31	3	—		—		4	1	35	4
Municipal	2020–21	Liga Nacional de Guatemala	20	1	—		1 (Note: Appearance in CONCACAF League.)	0	6	0	27	1
Municipal	Total		51	4	0	0	1	0	10	1	62	5
Career total			88	6	2	1	1	0	11	1	102	8

=== International ===
As of 11 June 2022

National team	Year	Apps	Goals
Guatemala	2019	2	1
Guatemala	2020	4	0
Guatemala	2021	9	1
Guatemala	2022	3	0
Total		18	2

Scores and results list Guatemala's goal tally first. Score column indicates score after each Barrientos goal.

List of international goals scored by Rudy Barrientos
No.	Date	Venue	Cap	Opponent	Score	Result	Competition	Ref.
1	21 November 2019	Estadio Israel Barrios, Coatepeque, Guatemala	2	Antigua and Barbuda	8–0	8–0	Friendly	
2	4 June 2021	Estadio Doroteo Guamuch Flores, Guatemala City, Guatemala	10	Saint Vincent and the Grenadines	2–0	10–0	2022 FIFA World Cup qualification	
