= Alvaro Verwey =

Surinamese footballer (born 1999)

Personal information
- Full name: Alvaro Xavier Verwey
- Date of birth: 12 January 1999 (age 27)
- Place of birth: Paramaribo, Suriname
- Position: Forward

Team information
- Current team: Kalamazoo FC
- Number: 30

Youth career
- –2011: S.V. Robinhood
- 2012–2016: Club Oase
- 2017: Vejle Boldklub

College career
Years	Team	Apps	(Gls)
2021–	LWC Blue Raiders	31	(12)

Senior career*
Years	Team	Apps	(Gls)
2016	WBC	1	(1)
2017	Vejle Boldklub	0	(0)
2017–2022	WBC		
2022–	Kalamazoo	3	(0)

International career^{‡}
- Suriname U15
- Suriname U17
2018–	Suriname U20	1	(3)
2018–	Suriname	3	(1)
- * Club domestic league appearances and goals ‡ National team caps and goals as of 05:47, 17 July 2021 (UTC)

Alvaro Verwey (born 12 January 1999) is a Surinamese footballer who previously played for WBC of the SVB Topklasse. He is the first native-born Surinamese youth player to sign for a European club directly from Suriname.

== Club career ==
=== Youth ===
As a youth, Verwey played for the junior side of S.V. Robinhood of the Topklasse and Club Oase. He remained with Robinhood until 2011. During his final season with the club, he was one of the league's top scorers with double digit goals. He joined Club Oase in 2012 and stayed at the club until 2016. For the 2016 season, he was the top scorer in the U17 division with 24 goals.

In 2014 and 2015 Verwey participated in the Digicel Kickstart Clinics hosted by Chelsea F.C. of the English Premier League. In 2015, his 3-on-3 team was picked to represent Suriname at the Digicel Academy later in the year by Chelsea FC Foundation Senior International Football Development Officer, David Monk. In 2016, Verwey trained with Argentine giants Boca Juniors. He was the first Surinamese player ever at the club. In summer 2016 he trained in the Netherlands.

=== Professional ===
In November 2016, Verwey went on trial with Vejle Boldklub of the Danish 1st Division. During the trial he appeared in matches against FC Helsingør and Nykøbing FC. He returned to Suriname after the trial and played for S.V. Walking Boyz Company of the Topklasse to gain experience while he waited to return to Denmark. During his time with WBC, he made one league appearance and scored a goal in his league debut on 17 December 2016, a 3–1 victory over SNL. He returned to Denmark in early January and it was announced that he was signed to a first-team contract for the second half of the season shortly thereafter. It was also expected that he may also play with the club's under-19 side. On 18 January 2017 he made his first appearance for the club after signing, coming on as a second-half substitute in a 2–2 friendly draw with Kolding IF during the league's winter break. The following week he made his debut for the Under-19 team away at FC St. Pauli II. Verwey started in the eventual 1–1 draw before being substituted off in the 63rd minute. A few days later on 28 January 2017, he scored his first goal for the U19 team in a 3–2 victory over Esbjerg fB U19 in what the club called the player's "best performance so far." Following his strong performances with the U19 team, he was named to the senior side's 18-man squad to face the first team of Danish Superliga club Esbjerg fB on 30 January 2017, still during the Danish 1st Division's winter break. Verwey appeared in the match as an 81st-minute substitute for Dominic Vinicius.

It was announced in June 2017 that Verwey had been released from Vejle. Following his departure from Vejle, he returned to Suriname and re-signed for WBC. In February 2018 he was tied for the top scorer in the under-20 division with eight goals.

== International career ==
Verwey has represented Suriname at the under-15 and under-17 levels. In 2014, he was named to Suriname's final squad for 2015 CONCACAF U-17 Championship qualification.

In July 2018 he traveled with the senior national team for a training camp in the Netherlands in preparation for 2019–20 CONCACAF Nations League qualifying and played in several matches against professional Dutch sides. After returning from the camp, he made his official senior debut on 18 August 2018 in a friendly against French Guiana. He also scored his first senior goal in the match, the fourth goal of the 4–0 victory. Verwey was named to the Suriname squad for the 2021 CONCACAF Gold Cup on June 25, 2021.

=== International goals ===
Score and result list Suriname's goal tally first.

#	Date	Venue	Opponent	Score	Result	Competition
1	18 August 2018	Stade de Baduel, Cayenne, French Guiana	French Guiana	4–0	4–0	Friendly
Last updated 19 August 2018
