= Jorge Cruz (footballer) =

Salvadoran football player (born 1995)

Personal information
- Full name: Jorge Antonio Cruz Cortez
- Date of birth: 24 January 2000 (age 26)
- Place of birth: Ahuachapán, El Salvador
- Height: 1.83 m (6 ft 0 in)
- Position: Centre-back

Team information
- Current team: FAS
- Number: 23

Youth career
- Once Lobos

Senior career*
Years	Team	Apps	(Gls)
2020–2021	Alianza	1	(0)
2021–2024	Once Deportivo	126	(5)
2024–	FAS	23	(2)

International career^{‡}
2023–	El Salvador	23	(0)
- * Club domestic league appearances and goals as of 18:55, 17 June 2025 (UTC) ‡ National team caps and goals as of 18:55, 17 June 2025 (UTC)

Jorge Antonio Cruz Cortez (born 24 January 2000) is a Salvadoran football player who plays as centre-back for Salvadoran Primera División club FAS, and the El Salvador national team.

== Career ==
A youth product of Once Lobos, Cruz began his senior career with Alianza in 2020 where he made one appearance. In 2021, he moved to Once Deportivo where he played over 100 matches and won the 2024–25 Apertura. On 4 January 2025, he transferred to FAS.

== International career ==
Cruz was called up to the El Salvador U20s for the 2018 CONCACAF U-20 Championship. He was first called up to the senior El Salvador national team in October 2023. He again made the squad for the 2025 CONCACAF Gold Cup.

== Honours ==
Alianza

- Primera División de Fútbol de El Salvador: 2020–21 Apertura

Once Deportivo

- Primera División de Fútbol de El Salvador: 2024–25 Apertura
