= Brian Elshot =

Surinamese footballer

Personal information
- Full name: Brian Elshot
- Date of birth: 18 January 2000 (age 26)
- Place of birth: Paramaribo, Suriname
- Position: Midfielder

Team information
- Current team: Cavalier

Senior career*
Years	Team	Apps	(Gls)
- Leo Victor
- PVV
2022–	Cavalier	15	(2)

International career
2017	Suriname U17	2	(0)
2018	Suriname U20	1	(3)
2018–	Suriname	1	(1)
- * Club domestic league appearances and goals

Brian Elshot (born 18 January 2000) is a Surinamese footballer who plays as a midfielder for Cavalier F.C. in the Jamaica Premier League and the Suriname national football team.

Elshot represented the Suriname U17 in a 1–1 draw against the Cuba U17, marking his debut at the youth international level.

He made his senior international debut for Suriname on 13 October 2018, scoring in a 5–0 victory over the British Virgin Islands during the CONCACAF Nations League qualifiers.

== International career ==
=== International goals ===
Scores and results list Suriname's goal tally first.

No.	Date	Venue	Opponent	Score	Result	Competition
1.	13 October 2018	André Kamperveen Stadion, Paramaribo, Suriname	British Virgin Islands	2–0	5–0	2019–20 CONCACAF Nations League qualification
