= Jaron Vicario =

Curaçaoan footballer (born 1999)

Personal information
- Date of birth: 16 August 1999 (age 27)
- Place of birth: Capelle aan den IJssel, Netherlands
- Height: 1.82 m (6 ft 0 in)
- Position: Attacking midfielder

Team information
- Current team: Triestina
- Number: 16

Youth career
- SC Botlek
- VV Spijkenisse
- 2016–2018: Feyenoord

Senior career*
Years	Team	Apps	(Gls)
2018–2019	Feyenoord	0	(0)
2019–2021	FC Dordrecht	28	(0)
2021–2022	Enosis Neon Paralimni		
2022–2023	SV Straelen	26	(2)
2023–2024	Den Bosch	31	(4)
2024–	Triestina	36	(1)
2025	→ Messina (loan)	8	(0)

International career^{‡}
2018	Curaçao U20	4	(2)
2024	Curaçao	1	(0)
- * Club domestic league appearances and goals as of 30 April 2026 ‡ National team caps and goals as of 00:00, 18 March 2025 (UTC)

Jaron Vicario (born 16 August 1999) is a professional footballer who plays as an attacking midfielder for Serie D Group C club Triestina. Born in the Netherlands, he has represented Curaçao at youth international level.

== Club career ==
Vicario began his career in the youth set-up at SC Botlek, before moving to VV Spijkenisse. In 2016, Vicario joined Feyenoord, signing his first professional contract with the club on 24 May 2018.

On 24 June 2019, Eerste Divisie club FC Dordrecht announced the signing of Vicario. He left the club after his contract expired in June 2021.

On 9 June 2023, Vicario signed a two-year contract with fellow second-tier club Den Bosch.

On 12 July 2024, Vicario joined Serie C side Triestina on a permanent deal, signing a three-year contract with the Italian club.

== International career ==
During the 2018 CONCACAF U-20 Championship, Vicario made four appearances for the Curaçao under-20 national team, scoring two goals in the process.
