= Ulysses Llanez =

American soccer player (born 2001)

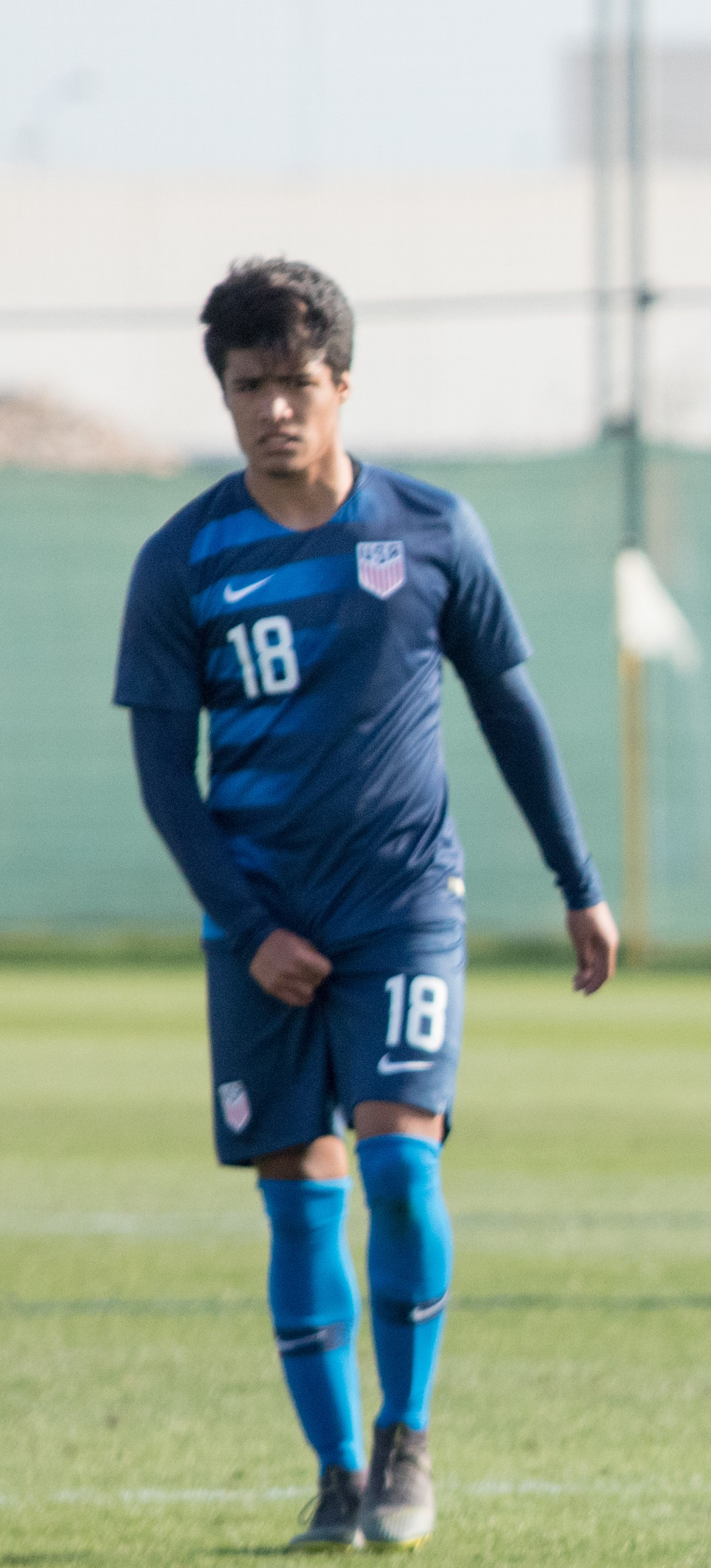
- Llanez with the United States U20 in 2019

Personal information
- Full name: Ulysses Llanez Jr.
- Date of birth: April 2, 2001 (age 25)
- Place of birth: Lynwood, California, U.S.
- Height: 1.75 m (5 ft 9 in)
- Position: Winger

Youth career
- 2015–2019: LA Galaxy
- 2019–: VfL Wolfsburg

Senior career*
Years	Team	Apps	(Gls)
2017–2018	LA Galaxy II	12	(2)
2020–2024	VfL Wolfsburg	0	(0)
2020	→ SC Heerenveen (loan)	5	(0)
2021–2023	→ St. Pölten (loan)	45	(11)

International career^{‡}
2017	United States U17	5	(2)
2018	United States U18	2	(1)
2018–2019	United States U20	12	(7)
2020	United States	3	(1)
- * Club domestic league appearances and goals as of May 18, 2024 ‡ National team caps and goals as of November 16, 2020

Ulysses Llanez Jr. (born April 2, 2001) is an American professional soccer player who plays as a winger.

== Club career ==
=== LA Galaxy II ===
Llanez made his professional debut for LA Galaxy II in a 0–2 loss to Phoenix Rising FC on August 6, 2017, coming on as an 88th-minute substitute for Josh Turnley.

=== VfL Wolfsburg ===
On his 18th birthday, April 2, 2019, Llanez announced that he had signed a professional contract to play for the German side VfL Wolfsburg. On September 15, 2020, Dutch Eredivisie side SC Heerenveen announced that they had signed Llanez on loan through the end of the 2020–21 season.

In July 2021, Llanez joined Austrian Second League side St. Pölten on loan.

== International career ==
=== 2017–2019: Youth level ===
Born in the United States, Llanez is of Mexican descent. He was previously called to youth training camps for the Mexico U-16 squad in 2017 but never made an appearance. Since then, he has represented the United States at the U-17, U-18, U-19, U-20, and senior levels.

A regular starter for the United States at the U-20 level, he was an integral part of the United States team at the 2019 FIFA U-20 World Cup.

=== 2020: Senior debut and first goal ===
On December 30, 2019, Llanez was called up to the senior squad for the first time. On February 1, 2020, Llanez made his senior debut for United States, starting and scoring the only goal in 1–0 friendly win over Costa Rica.

On November 3, 2020, Llanez was named to the United States senior squad for two friendlies against Wales and Panama.

== Career statistics ==
=== Club ===
As of match played April 29, 2023

Appearances and goals by club, season and competition
Club	Season	League			Cup		Continental		Other		Total	
Club	Season	Division	Apps	Goals	Apps	Goals	Apps	Goals	Apps	Goals	Apps	Goals
LA Galaxy II	2017	USL	2	0	–		–		–		2	0
LA Galaxy II	2018	USL	10	2	–		–		–		10	2
LA Galaxy II	Total		12	2	–		–		–		12	2
Wolfsburg	2019–20	Bundesliga	0	0	0	0	–		–		0	0
Heerenveen (loan)	2020–21	Eredivisie	5	0	1	0	–		–		6	0
St. Pölten (loan)	2021–22	Austrian Second League	25	6	2	0	–		–		27	6
St. Pölten (loan)	2022–23	Austrian Second League	20	5	2	2	–		–		22	7
St. Pölten (loan)	Total		45	11	4	2	–		–		48	13
Career total			62	12	5	2	0	0	0	0	67	14

=== International ===
As of November 16, 2020

Appearances and goals by national team and year
National team	Year	Apps	Goals
United States	2020	3	1
Total		3	1

Scores and results list United States' goal tally first, score column indicates score after each Llanez goal.

No.	Date	Venue	Opponent	Score	Result	Competition
1.	February 1, 2020	Dignity Health Sports Park, Carson, United States	Costa Rica	1–0	1–0	Friendly

== Honors ==
United States U20

- CONCACAF U-20 Championship: 2018

Individual

- CONCACAF Under-20 Championship Best XI: 2018
