= 1970 CONCACAF Youth Tournament =

Tournament details
- Host country: Cuba
- City: Havana
- Dates: 27 September – 9 October
- Teams: 5
- Venue(s): Estadio Universitario Juan Abrantes

Final positions
- Champions: Mexico (2nd title)
- Runners-up: Cuba
- Third place: Jamaica
- Fourth place: El Salvador

The 1970 CONCACAF Youth Tournament was held in Cuba.

== Teams ==
The following teams entered the tournament:

Team	Qualification	Appearances	Previous best performances
North American zone
Mexico	Automatic	3rd	Champions (1962)
Central American zone
El Salvador	Automatic	3rd	Champions (1964)
Caribbean zone
Bermuda	Automatic	1st	–
Cuba	Host	1st	–
Jamaica	Automatic	2nd	First round (1964)

== Matches ==
Teams	Pld	W	D	L	GF	GA	GD	Pts
Mexico	4	3	1	0	13	2	+11	7
Cuba	4	2	2	0	8	1	+7	6
Jamaica	4	0	3	1	2	6	–4	3
El Salvador	4	1	1	2	3	9	–6	3
Bermuda	4	0	1	3	4	12	–8	1

27 September	Cuba	1–1	Jamaica
29 September	Mexico	6–0	El Salvador
30 September	Cuba	5–0	Bermuda
1 October	El Salvador	0–0	Jamaica
2 October	Bermuda	2–3	Mexico
4 October	Cuba	2–0	El Salvador
	Jamaica	1–1	Bermuda
6 October	Mexico	4–0	Jamaica
7 October	El Salvador	3–1	Bermuda
9 October	Cuba	0–0	Mexico

1970 CONCACAF Youth Championship

Mexico
Second title
