= Kareem Foster =

Caymanian footballer

Personal information
- Date of birth: 6 September 2000 (age 26)
- Place of birth: George Town, Cayman Islands
- Height: 1.70 m (5 ft 7 in)
- Position: Forward

Team information
- Current team: Westfield

Youth career
- Cayman Athletic

Senior career*
Years	Team	Apps	(Gls)
- Cayman Athletic
- Westfield

International career^{‡}
- Cayman Islands U15
- Cayman Islands U17
2018	Cayman Islands U20	3	(3)
2021–	Cayman Islands	1	(0)
- * Club domestic league appearances and goals as of 26 March 2021 ‡ National team caps and goals as of 26 March 2021

Kareem Foster (born 6 September 2000) is a Caymanian footballer who currently plays for Westfield. Besides Cayman Islands, he has played in England.

== Career statistics ==
=== International ===
As of match played 3 June 2021.

National team	Year	Apps	Goals
Cayman Islands	2021	1	0
Total		1	0
