= Carlos Villegas =

Costa Rican footballer (born 1999)

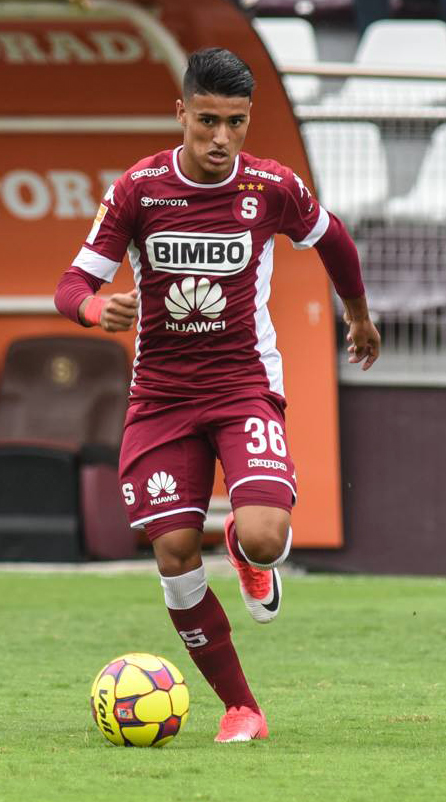

Personal information
- Full name: Carlos Arturo Villegas Retana
- Date of birth: 3 March 1999 (age 27)
- Place of birth: Heredia, Costa Rica
- Height: 1.70 m (5 ft 7 in)
- Position: Winger

Team information
- Current team: Inter de San Carlos
- Number: 17

Youth career
- Deportivo Saprissa

Senior career*
Years	Team	Apps	(Gls)
2017–2020	Deportivo Saprissa	13	(1)
2019–2020	→ Municipal Grecia (loan)	23	(1)
2020	Puerto Golfito	13	(2)
2021	Limón	19	(5)
2021–2024	Deportivo Saprissa	34	(2)
2023	→ Santos de Guápiles (loan)	20	(2)
2023–2024	→ Municipal Grecia (loan)	26	(3)
2024–	Inter de San Carlos		

International career
2018	Costa Rica U20	4	(2)
- * Club domestic league appearances and goals as of 11:53, 1 April 2024 (UTC)

Carlos Arturo Villegas Retana (born 3 March 1999) is a Costa Rican footballer who plays as a winger for Inter de San Carlos.

== Club career ==
=== Deportivo Saprissa ===
Villegas is a product of Deportivo Saprissa and was promoted to the senior squad in 2017, under the command of coach Carlos Watson. For the start of the Summer Championship that took place on January 8, Saprissa was going to face San Carlos, with Villegas on the bench for the first time. 17-year old Villegas made his professional debut one month later, on 8 February 2017, against Belén FC, when he came on as a substitute for Anderson Leite in the 69th minute, and the result ended with an unexpected 0–1 defeat. He made a total of six appearances in that season.

On 28 February 2018 Villegas' agent, Joaquim Batica, confirmed that Villegas in March would go for a trial at the U20 squad of Brazilian team Grêmio, alongside his Saprissa-teammate Julen Cordero.

==== Loan to Municipal Grecia ====
With only seven appearances in the following two season for Saprissa, Villegas was loaned out to Municipal Grecia in January 2019 for the rest of the year. He left the club again at the end of the year, where his loan deal expired. However, he was still a part of the Grecia-squad for three games during 2020, which indicated, that the loan deal, however, had been extended. During his time at Grecia, Villegas made a total of 23 appearances where he scored one goal.

=== Puerto Golfito ===
In the summer 2020, Villegas joined Costa Rican second division club Puerto Golfito FC.

=== Return to Deportivo Saprissa ===
After a spell at Limón, Villegas returned to Deportivo Saprissa, signing a three-year deal until May 2024 on 28 July 2021. He left Saprissa in the summer 2024.

Later in the summer 2024, Villegas joined Inter de San Carlos.
