= Diego Valanta =

Panamanian footballer (born 2000)

Personal information
- Full name: Diego Ezequiel Valanta Del Busto
- Date of birth: 8 September 2000 (age 26)
- Place of birth: Panama City, Panama
- Height: 1.65 m (5 ft 5 in)
- Position: Winger

Team information
- Current team: Inter Playa del Carmen
- Number: 8

Senior career*
| Years | Team | Apps | (Gls) |
| 2016–2021 | Tauro | 18 | (2) |
| 2021–2022 | Chiapas | 22 | (6) |
| 2022– | Inter Playa del Carmen | 19 | (5) |

International career^{‡}
| 2017 | Panama U17 | 5 | (0) |
| 2018–2019 | Panama U20 | 9 | (6) |
| 2020– | Panama | 1 | (0) |
- * Club domestic league appearances and goals as of 8 May 2023 ‡ National team caps and goals as of 11 October 2020

Diego Ezequiel Valanta Del Busto (born 8 September 2000) is a Panamanian football player who plays as winger for Santos Guápiles.

== International career ==
Valanta debuted with the Panama national team in a friendly 1-0 win over Costa Rica on 10 October 2020.
