= Adrián Lozano =

Mexican footballer (born 1999)

Personal information
- Full name: Adrián Lozano Magallanes
- Date of birth: 8 May 1999 (age 27)
- Place of birth: Torreón, Coahuila, Mexico
- Height: 1.74 m (5 ft 9 in)
- Position: Midfielder

Team information
- Current team: Calor
- Number: 10

Youth career
- 2011–2019: Santos Laguna

Senior career*
Years	Team	Apps	(Gls)
2019–2023	Santos Laguna	33	(2)
2021	→ Atlético San Luis (loan)	0	(0)
2022	→ Celaya (loan)	13	(0)
2022–2023	→ UAT (loan)	17	(1)
2023	Puntarenas	15	(0)
2024–2025	Durango	37	(9)
2025–	Calor	7	(1)

International career^{‡}
2018–2019	Mexico U20	7	(1)
- * Club domestic league appearances and goals as of 3 June 2023 ‡ National team caps and goals as of 28 April 2019

Adrián Lozano Magallanes (born 8 May 1999) is a Mexican professional footballer who plays as a midfielder.

== International career ==
In April 2019, Lozano was included in the 21-player squad to represent Mexico at the U-20 World Cup in Poland.

== Career statistics ==
=== Club ===
As of match played 3 June 2023

Appearances and goals by club, season and competition
Club	Season	League			Cup		Continental		Other		Total	
Club	Season	Division	Apps	Goals	Apps	Goals	Apps	Goals	Apps	Goals	Apps	Goals
Santos Laguna	2019–20	Liga MX	21	2	7	2	–		–		28	4
Santos Laguna	2020–21	Liga MX	12	0	–		–		–		12	0
Santos Laguna	Total		33	2	7	2	–		–		40	4
Celaya (loan)	2021–22	Liga de Expansión MX	13	0	–		–		–		13	0
UAT (loan)	2022–23	Liga de Expansión MX	17	1	–		–		–		17	1
Career total			63	3	7	2	0	0	0	0	70	5
