= 1974 CONCACAF Youth Tournament =

Tournament details
- Host country: Canada
- Dates: 16 August – 1 September
- Teams: 12

Final positions
- Champions: Mexico (4th title)
- Runners-up: Cuba
- Third place: Trinidad and Tobago

The 1974 CONCACAF Youth Tournament was held in Canada.

== Teams ==
The following teams entered the tournament:

Region	Team(s)
Caribbean (CFU)	Bermuda; Cuba; Dominican Republic; Jamaica; Puerto Rico; Trinidad and Tobago
Central America (UNCAF)	Costa Rica; Guatemala; Nicaragua
North America (NAFU)	Canada (host); Mexico; United States

== Group stage ==
=== Group A ===
Teams	Pld	W	D	L	GF	GA	GD	Pts
Canada	3	3	0	0	11	2	+9	6
Bermuda	3	2	0	1	4	4	0	4
Nicaragua	3	1	0	2	3	5	–2	2
Dominican Republic	3	0	0	3	1	8	–7	0

Nicaragua	2–1	Dominican Republic
Canada	4–1	Bermuda
Bermuda	2–0	Nicaragua
Bermuda	1–0	Dominican Republic
Canada	2–1	Nicaragua
Dominican Republic	0–5	Canada

=== Group B ===
Teams	Pld	W	D	L	GF	GA	GD	Pts
Mexico	3	2	1	0	17	0	+17	5
Trinidad and Tobago	3	1	2	0	7	1	+6	4
Costa Rica	3	1	1	1	7	2	+5	3
Puerto Rico	3	0	0	3	0	28	–28	0

Costa Rica	1–1	Trinidad and Tobago
Puerto Rico	0–16	Mexico
Costa Rica	6–0	Puerto Rico
Mexico	0–0	Trinidad and Tobago
Trinidad and Tobago	6–0	Puerto Rico
Mexico	1–0	Costa Rica

=== Group C ===
Teams	Pld	W	D	L	GF	GA	GD	Pts
United States	3	2	1	0	4	2	+2	5
Cuba	3	1	1	1	2	2	0	3
Guatemala	3	1	0	2	4	5	–1	2
Jamaica	3	1	0	2	3	4	–1	2

Cuba	1–0	Jamaica
United States	2–1	Guatemala
Jamaica	2–1	Guatemala
Guatemala	2–1	Cuba
United States	2–1	Jamaica
Cuba	0–0	United States

== Play-off round ==
Mexico achieved the best score and apparently moved straight to the final. The other two winners Cuba and Trinidad and Tobago first had to play each other for the other final spot.

26 August 1974

Canada	2 – 2	Cuba
Penalties
	4 – 5

28 August 1974

Mexico	3 – 0	Bermuda

28 August 1974

United States	1 – 1	Trinidad and Tobago
Penalties
	4 – 5

== Play-off for final ==
30 August 1974

Cuba	2 – 0	Trinidad and Tobago

== Final ==
1 September 1974

Mexico	1 – 0	Cuba

1974 CONCACAF Youth Championship

Mexico
Fourth title

== Discrepancies ==
The above results are based on the official account from the CONCACAF. However, RSSSF also reports on the tournament, with (very) different results. The tournament format is different, some scores are, as well as match dates.
