= Darren Modoo =

Grenadian Professional footballer

Personal information
- Date of birth: 21 May 1998 (age 28)
- Place of birth: Mirabeau, Grenada
- Height: 1.90 m (6 ft 3 in)
- Position: Forward

Senior career*
Years	Team	Apps	(Gls)
2017–2018	Paradise FC		
2018–	SAB Spartans		

International career^{‡}
2017	Grenada	5	(0)
- * Club domestic league appearances and goals as of 17:57, 2 June 2020 (UTC) ‡ National team caps and goals as of 17:57, 2 June 2020 (UTC)

Darren Modoo (born 21 May 1998), is a Grenadian professional footballer who currently plays for GFA Premier Division side Paradise FC.

== International career ==
Modoo made his international debut on 29 April 2017, replacing Jamal Charles in the 70th minute.

== Athletics career ==
As well as football, Modoo also competes in athletics, and has represented Grenada in javelin at the 2016 CARIFTA Games.

== Career statistics ==
=== International ===
As of matches played 2 June 2020.

National team	Year	Apps	Goals
Grenada	2017	5	0
Total		5	0
