= Diego Hernández (footballer, born 1999) =

Mexican footballer (born 1999)

Personal information
- Full name: Diego Hernández Jiménez
- Date of birth: 13 August 1999 (age 27)
- Place of birth: Guadalajara, Jalisco, México
- Height: 1.73 m (5 ft 8 in)
- Position: Winger

Team information
- Current team: Forca Kochi FC
- Number: 7

Youth career
- 2014–2017: Guadalajara

Senior career*
Years	Team	Apps	(Gls)
2018–2022	Guadalajara	1	(0)
2019–2020	→ Atlético San Luis (loan)	5	(0)
2020–2021	→ Tapatío (loan)	20	(0)
2021–2022	→ Tampico Madero (loan)	28	(0)
2022–2023	Cancún	32	(1)
2023–2025	UAT	24	(0)
2025–2026	Penya Encarnada	21	(1)

International career
2018–2019	Mexico U20	9	(3)
- * Club domestic league appearances and goals as of September 2026

Diego Hernández Jiménez (born 13 August 1999) is a Mexican professional footballer who plays as a winger.

== International career ==
In April 2019, Hernández was included in the 21-player squad to represent Mexico at the U-20 World Cup in Poland.
