= José Ardón =

Guatemalan footballer (born 2000)

Personal information
- Full name: José Agustín Ardón Castellanos
- Date of birth: 20 January 2000 (age 26)
- Place of birth: Villa Canales, Guatemala
- Height: 1.75 m (5 ft 9 in)
- Position: Defender

Team information
- Current team: Antigua
- Number: 12

Youth career
- Los Pumas
- 2016–2018: Antigua

Senior career*
| Years | Team | Apps | (Gls) |
| 2018– | Antigua | 161 | (20) |

International career^{‡}
| 2018 | Guatemala U20 | 4 | (1) |
| 2019 | Guatemala U23 | 6 | (2) |
| 2022– | Guatemala | 36 | (1) |
- * Club domestic league appearances and goals as of 18:55, 17 June 2025 (UTC) ‡ National team caps and goals as of 18:55, 17 June 2025 (UTC)

José Agustín Ardón Castellanos (born 20 January 2000) is a Guatemalan professional footballer who plays as defender for Liga Guate club Antigua, which he captains, and the Guatemala national team.

== Club career ==
Ardón began playing football with his local club Los Pumas, before joining Antigua's youth academy in 2018. He helped them win the 2018–19 Clausura. He captained the team as they won the league again during the 2024–25 Liga Nacional de Guatemala.

== International career ==
=== Youth career ===
Ardón played for the Guatemala U20s at the 2018 CONCACAF U-20 Championship.

=== Senior career ===
He made the senior Guatemala national team final squad for the 2023 CONCACAF Gold Cup. He again made the final squad for the 2025 CONCACAF Gold Cup.

== Honours ==
Antigua

- Liga Nacional de Fútbol de Guatemala: 2018–19 Clausura, 2024–25 Clausura

Individual

- 2024 CONCACAF Central American Cup Team of the Season
