= Efraín Orona =

Mexican footballer (born 1999)

Personal information
- Full name: Efraín Orona Zavala
- Date of birth: 22 February 1999 (age 27)
- Place of birth: Jiménez Municipality, Chihuahua, Mexico
- Height: 1.82 m (6 ft 0 in)
- Position: Centre-back

Team information
- Current team: Santos Laguna
- Number: 14

Youth career
- 2012–2019: Pachuca

Senior career*
Years	Team	Apps	(Gls)
2019–2023	Pachuca	19	(0)
2021–2022	→ Atlético San Luis (loan)	16	(1)
2022–2023	→ Mazatlán (loan)	18	(0)
2023–2025	Puebla	64	(1)
2026–	Santos Laguna	21	(0)

International career
2019	Mexico U20	3	(0)
- * Club domestic league appearances and goals as of 21 November 2026

Efraín Orona Zavala (born 22 February 1999) is a Mexican professional footballer who plays as a defensive midfielder for Liga MX club Santos Laguna.

== International career ==
In April 2019, Orona was included in the 21-player squad to represent Mexico at the U-20 World Cup in Poland.

== Career statistics ==
=== Club ===
As of match played on 21 November 2026

Club	Season	League			Cup		Continental		Other		Total	
Club	Season	Division	Apps	Goals	Apps	Goals	Apps	Goals	Apps	Goals	Apps	Goals
Pachuca	2018–19	Liga MX	2	0	7	0	—		—		9	0
Pachuca	2019–20	Liga MX	4	0	8	1	—		—		12	1
Pachuca	2020–21	Liga MX	13	0	—		—		—		13	0
Pachuca	Total		19	0	15	1	—		—		34	1
Atlético San Luis (loan)	2021–22	Liga MX	16	1	—		—		—		16	1
Mazatlán (loan)	2022–23	Liga MX	18	0	3 (Note: Appearances in Copa Sky por México)	0	—		—		21	0
Puebla	2023–24	Liga MX	18	0	—		—		1 (Note: Appearances in Leagues Cup)	0	19	0
Puebla	2024–25	Liga MX	34	1	—		—		2	0	36	1
Puebla	2025–26	Liga MX	12	0	—		—		2	0	14	0
Puebla	Total		64	1	—		—		5	0	69	1
Santos Laguna	2025–26	Liga MX	12	0	—		—		—		12	0
Santos Laguna	2026–27	Liga MX	9	0	—		—		2	0	11	0
Santos Laguna	Total		21	0	—		—		2	0	23	0
Career total			72	2	18	1	0	0	7	0	97	3
