= Rivaldo Ibarra =

Cuban footballer (born 1999)

Personal information
- Full name: Rivaldo Ibarra Thompson
- Date of birth: 6 July 1999 (age 27)
- Place of birth: Cuba
- Height: 1.78 m (5 ft 10 in)
- Position: Midfielder

Senior career*
Years	Team	Apps	(Gls)
2018	Ciudad de La Habana	6	(1)
2020–2021	Fort Lauderdale CF	5	(0)

International career^{‡}
2018	Cuba U20	3	(2)
- * Club domestic league appearances and goals as of 31 October 2021 ‡ National team caps and goals as of 3 October 2020

Rivaldo Ibarra Thompson (born 6 July 1999) is a Cuban footballer who plays as a midfielder.

== Career ==
=== Fort Lauderdale ===
Ibarra joined Fort Lauderdale CF in early 2020, prior to the club's inaugural season in USL League One. He made his competitive debut for the club on 24 September 2020, coming on as a 77th-minute substitute for Blaine Ferri in a 2–1 away defeat to the Richmond Kickers.
