= Sint Maarten national under-20 football team =

Sint Maarten U20
- Association: SMSF
- Confederation: CONCACAF (North America)
- Sub-confederation: CFU (Caribbean)
- Top scorer: Jaeremi Drijvers (3)
- Home stadium: Raoul Illidge Sports Complex
- FIFA code: SMN

The Sint Maarten national under-20 football team is the official under-20 football team the Caribbean Island of Sint Maarten, under the control of the Sint Maarten Soccer Association. The association is a member of CONCACAF and the Caribbean Football Union and has therefore been eligible to participate in the CONCACAF Under-20 Championship and other sanctioned tournaments since 2002.

== CONCACAF Under-20 Championship ==
CONCACAF Under-20 Championship Record
Hosts / Year	Result	Position	GP	W	D	L	GS	GA
(Panama) 1962 to (Canada) / (Trinidad and Tobago) 2001	Not a CONCACAF member							
(Panama) / (United States) 2003	Did not enter							
(United States) / (Honduras) 2005	Did not enter							
(Panama) / (Mexico) 2007	Did not enter							
(Trinidad and Tobago) 2009	Did not enter							
(Guatemala) 2009	Did not enter							
(Mexico) 2013	Did not enter							
(Jamaica) 2015	Did not enter							
(Costa Rica) 2017	Did not qualify	Qualifying	3	0	0	3	0	20
(United States) 2018	Group Stage	6th, Group C	5	0	0	5	4	41
(Honduras) 2020	Did not enter, but Cancelled due to COVID-19 pandemic							
(United States) 2022	To be determined	Qualifying	0	0	0	0	0	0
Total	0/5	Qualifying	9	0	2	7	4	29
