= Belize national under-20 football team =

National association football team

Belize U-20
- Association: Football Federation of Belize
- Confederation: CONCACAF (North America)
- Head coach: Marin Philip Elexious
- FIFA code: BLZ

First international
- Costa Rica 1–0 Belize (Alajuela, Costa Rica; unknown date 1990)

Biggest win
- Saint Martin 1–6 Belize (Santo Domingo, Dominican Republic; 9 November 2021)

Biggest defeat
- Belize 0–8 Costa Rica (Belmopan, Belize; unknown date 1990)

CONCACAF Under-20 Championship
- Appearances: 2 (first in 1994)
- Best result: Group stage (1994, 2018)

The Belize national under-20 football team represents Belize in international football at this age level and is controlled by the Football Federation of Belize.

== See also ==
- Belize national football team
