= Brian López =

Dominican Republic footballer (b. 1999)

Personal information
- Full name: Brian López Nina
- Date of birth: 20 November 1999 (age 26)
- Place of birth: Terrassa, Spain
- Height: 1.82 m (6 ft 0 in)
- Position: Centre-back

Youth career
- 2013–2015: Cornellà
- 2015–2017: Sabadell
- 2017: Peña Deportiva
- 2017–2018: Cornellà

Senior career*
Years	Team	Apps	(Gls)
2018–2019	Sants	19	(2)
2019–2020	Horta	0	(0)
2020–2021	Atlético Porcuna	28	(1)
2021–2022	Ursaria	20	(1)
2022	Atlético Pantoja	15	(3)
2023–2025	Real Santa Cruz	53	(3)
2025	Royal Pari	1	(2)
2026	Universitario	5	(0)
2026-	Moca	4	(0)

International career^{‡}
2018	Dominican Republic U17	4	(0)
2018	Dominican Republic U20	4	(1)
2019	Dominican Republic U23	7	(1)
2019–	Dominican Republic	11	(0)
- * Club domestic league appearances and goals as of 5 October 2026 ‡ National team caps and goals as of 5 October 2026

Brian López Nina (born 20 November 1999) is a professional footballer who plays as a centre-back. Born in Spain, he plays for the Dominican Republic national team.

== International career ==
López made his international debut for the Dominican Republic in 2019.
