= Juan Ángeles =

Dominican footballer

Personal information
- Full name: Juan Ángeles Sánchez
- Date of birth: 16 October 2000 (age 26)
- Place of birth: Moca, Dominican Republic
- Height: 1.65 m (5 ft 5 in)
- Position: Striker

Team information
- Current team: Cibao
- Number: 18

Senior career*
Years	Team	Apps	(Gls)
2016–2026	Moca	159+	(39)
2026-	Cibao	2	(0)

International career^{‡}
2018	Dominican Republic U20	5	(3)
2019–	Dominican Republic U23	1+	(1)
2016–	Dominican Republic	4	(0)
- * Club domestic league appearances and goals as of 24 Augustl 2026 ‡ National team caps and goals as of 20 April 2026

Juan Ángeles Sánchez (born 16 October 2000) is a Dominican footballer who plays as a forward for Liga Dominicana de Fútbol club Moca and the Dominican Republic national team.

== International career ==
His debut with the Dominican national team was during 2017 Caribbean Cup qualification, on March 29,2016.
