= Erick Japa =

Dominican footballer

Personal information
- Full name: Erick Odali Paniagua Japa
- Date of birth: 6 April 1999 (age 27)
- Place of birth: San Cristóbal, Dominican Republic
- Height: 1.83 m (6 ft 0 in)
- Positions: Winger; forward

Team information
- Current team: Municipal
- Number: 99

Senior career*
Years	Team	Apps	(Gls)
2016–2017	Atlético San Cristóbal		
2017	Inter RD		
2018	Atlético San Cristóbal	10+	(2)
2018–2019	Independiente La Chorrera	3	(1)
2019	Independiente Juniors	3	(0)
2020-2021	Pantoja	20	(4)
2021-2023	Cibao FC	50	(11)
2024	Club Deportivo Guabirá	27	(3)
2025	Umecit FC	28	(5)
2026	Aucas	3	(0)
2026-	Municipal	7	(0)

International career^{‡}
2016–2018	Dominican Republic U20	4	(6)
2019–2023	Dominican Republic U23	1	(0)
2018–	Dominican Republic	21	(4)
- * Club domestic league appearances and goals as of 17 November 2026 ‡ National team caps and goals as of 6 June 2026

Erick Odali Paniagua Japa (born 6 April 1999), known as Erick Japa, is a Dominican professional footballer who plays as a forward for club Municipal and the Dominican Republic national team.

== International career ==
Japa made his debut for Dominican Republic on 22 March 2018, being a second-half substitute in a 4–0 friendly win against Turks and Caicos Islands.

=== International goals ===
Scores and results list Dominican Republic's goal tally first, score column indicates score after each Japa goal.

List of international goals scored by Erick Japa
No.	Date	Venue	Opponent	Score	Result	Competition
1	23 March 2024	Estadio Cibao FC, Santiago de los Caballeros, Dominican Republic	Aruba	2–0	2–0	Friendly
2	16 November 2024	Estadio Cibao FC, Santiago de los Caballeros, Dominican Republic	Dominica	6–1	6–1	2024–25 CONCACAF Nations League B
3	3 June 2026	Estadio Rommel Fernández, Ciudad de Panama, Panama	Panama	2–3	2–4	Friendly
