= Ronaldo Araya =

Costa Rican football player (born 1999)

Ronaldo Araya (born 3 August 1999) is a Costa Rican professional footballer who plays as a midfielder for C.S. Herediano in the Costa Rican Liga FPD.

Araya made his debut for the senior Costa Rica national team at the Avaya Stadium on 2 February 2019 against the United States.
