= Bermuda national under-20 football team =

Bermuda
- Nickname: Gombey Warriors
- Association: Bermuda Football Association
- Confederation: CONCACAF (North America)
- Sub-confederation: CFU (Caribbean)
- Home stadium: Bermuda National Stadium
- FIFA code: BER
First colours	Second colours

First international
- Cuba 5–0 Bermuda (Havana, Cuba; 30 September 1970)

Biggest win
- Bermuda 9–0 Turks and Caicos Islands (Charlotte Amalie, U.S. Virgin Islands; 8 January 2017)

Biggest defeat
- Bermuda 1–11 Haiti (Port-au-Prince, Haiti; 5 May 2007)

CONCACAF Under-20 Championship
- Appearances: 13 (first in 1970)
- Best result: 4th place (1970)

The Bermuda national under-20 football team represents Bermuda in international football at this age level and is controlled by the Bermuda Football Association.

== Current players ==
The following players were called up for the 2026 CONCACAF U-20 Championship qualifying matches against Trinidad and Tobago, Barbados, Costa Rica and Sint Maarten on 24 and 26 February and 2 and 4 March 2026; respectively.

Caps and goals correct as of 2 March 2026, after the match against Costa Rica.

No.	Pos.	Player	Date of birth (age)	Caps	Goals	Club
	GK	David Martin	29 August 2007 (age 18)	4	0	(United States Soccer Federation) Maryland United
	GK	Daniel Powell	17 September 2007 (age 18)	2	0	(The Football Association) Bournemouth
	GK	Curtis Jackson	9 May 2009 (age 16)	0	0	(Bermuda Football Association) Robin Hood
	DF	Nayan Grant	7 September 2007 (age 18)	5	0	(The Football Association) Gillingham
	DF	Emeer Peets	5 May 2008 (age 17)	3	0	(The Football Association) Mansfield Town
	DF	D'Ari Coddington	12 March 2008 (age 18)	2	0	(Bermuda Football Association) Devonshire Cougars
	DF	Michari Tear-De Leon	7 January 2007 (age 19)	2	0	Unknown
	DF	Dakari Smith-Davis	1 March 2008 (age 18)	1	0	(Bermuda Football Association) PHC Zebras
	MF	Xahvi Deroza	18 March 2007 (age 18)	6	4	(United States Soccer Federation) New Hampshire Wildcats
	MF	Kennahz Fray	7 February 2008 (age 18)	3	1	(The Football Association) Brooke House College Football Academy
	MF	Harlem Bean-Fox	27 July 2008 (age 17)	2	0	(Bermuda Football Association) PHC Zebras
	MF	James Morrison	16 April 2007 (age 18)	1	1	(Bermuda Football Association) Bascome Bermuda
	MF	Qur'an Raynor	17 April 2007 (age 18)	1	0	(Bermuda Football Association) Somerset Trojans
	MF	Isai Gibbons	26 October 2008 (age 17)	0	0	(Bermuda Football Association) Bascome Bermuda
	FW	Jace Donawa	1 August 2007 (age 18)	3	2	(United States Soccer Federation) North Carolina Tar Heels
	FW	Malachai Belboda	8 April 2007 (age 18)	3	0	(The Football Association) Walthamstow
	FW	Kalen Brunson	17 April 2009 (age 16)	3	0	(The Football Association) Queens Park Rangers
	FW	Logan Jiménez	15 May 2008 (age 17)	3	0	(Scottish Football Association) Hibernian
	MF	Khari Sharrieff	12 September 2007 (age 18)	3	0	(United States Soccer Federation) Howard Bison
	FW	Blayz Borgesson	15 September 2008 (age 17)	2	0	(The Football Association) Salford City
	FW	Daqaio Stewart	14 April 2007 (age 18)	1	0	(Bermuda Football Association) Somerset Trojans

== See also ==
- Bermuda national football team
- Bermuda national under-17 football team
