= Suriname national under-20 football team =

Suriname
- Association: Surinaamse Voetbal Bond
- Confederation: CONCACAF
- Head coach: Werner Blackson
- FIFA code: SUR
First colours	Second colours

CONCACAF U-20 Championship
- Appearances: 7 (first in 1976)
- Best result: Group stage

The Suriname national under-20 football team represents Suriname in international football at this age level and is overseen by the Surinaamse Voetbal Bond.

== Technical staff ==
- Head Coach: Werner Blackson
- Asst. Coach: Raymond Mannen
- Goalkeeping Coach: Rodney Oldenstam

== Current players ==
The following players were called up for the 2026 CONCACAF U-20 Championship qualifying matches.

No.	Pos.	Player	Date of birth (age)	Club
	GK	Tyron Chaar	August 10, 2007 (age 18)	(Royal Dutch Football Association) FC Volendam
	GK	Jeraldo Poetisi	July 6, 2007 (age 18)	(Surinamese Football Association) Inter Moengotapoe
	GK	Shomaro De Switt	February 11, 2007 (age 19)	(Surinamese Football Association) Notch
	DF	Ky-Mani Leliendal	November 28, 2007 (age 18)	(The Football Association) Blackpool F.C.
	DF	Jayden Sitabi	April 29, 2007 (age 18)	(Royal Dutch Football Association) Telstar
	DF	Elgin Josias	December 23, 2007 (age 18)	(Royal Dutch Football Association) Willem II
	DF	Chaverno Edelsteen	September 16, 2007 (age 18)	(Surinamese Football Association) Transvaal
	DF	Disteny Gali	September 28, 2007 (age 18)	(Surinamese Football Association) Voorwaarts
	DF	Uchensky Pienas	January 1, 2008 (age 18)	(Surinamese Football Association) Transvaal
	DF	Naiem Helstone	April 20, 2007 (age 18)	(Surinamese Football Association) Robinhood
	MF	Quincy Mac Donald	December 24, 2007 (age 18)	(Royal Dutch Football Association) Willem II
	MF	Michel Doekoe	April 6, 2008 (age 17)	(Surinamese Football Association) Broki
	MF	Aftaab Madar	February 6, 2008 (age 18)	(Surinamese Football Association) Transvaal
	MF	Rojendro Oudsten	November 12, 2007 (age 18)	(Royal Dutch Football Association) Telstar
	FW	Jeremiah Nirk	March 7, 2008 (age 17)	(Royal Dutch Football Association) Feyenoord
	FW	Milan Wilson	December 22, 2007 (age 18)	(Royal Dutch Football Association) Telstar
	FW	Xavi Dors	August 3, 2007 (age 18)	(Royal Dutch Football Association) Almere City
	FW	Gino Grootfaam	November 5, 2007 (age 18)	(Royal Dutch Football Association) N.E.C. Nijmegen
	FW	Jenario Ligeon	November 23, 2007 (age 18)	(Surinamese Football Association) Robinhood
	FW	Jemairo Djoe	October 25, 2007 (age 18)	(Surinamese Football Association) Inter Moengotapoe
	FW	Adenti Taylor	May 17, 2008 (age 17)	(Surinamese Football Association) Voorwaarts

=== Recent call-ups ===
The following 20 players were called up for the 2024 CONCACAF U-20 Championship qualifying matches.

No.	Pos.	Player	Date of birth (age)	Club
	GK	Jahnilo Wiegel	March 13, 2005 (age 20)	(Royal Dutch Football Association) PEC Zwolle
	GK	Rosano Saling	May 6, 2006 (age 19)	(Surinamese Football Association) Robinhood
	GK	Charles Toemisa		(Surinamese Football Association) Notch
	DF	Donty Apinsa		(Royal Dutch Football Association) Go Ahead Eagles
	DF	Yves Caffe		(Surinamese Football Association) Inter Moengotapoe
	DF	Triatcheno Drenthe		(Surinamese Football Association) Inter Moengotapoe
	DF	Jereno van Gom	May 28, 2005 (age 20)	(Royal Dutch Football Association) AZ
	DF	Marcello Maatruik		(Surinamese Football Association) Notch
	DF	Yamano Olfers	August 2, 2006 (age 19)	(Royal Dutch Football Association) Telstar
	DF	Safino Tuur		(Surinamese Football Association) Transvaal
	MF	Shivano Akoete		(Surinamese Football Association) Notch
	MF	Marley Dors	June 11, 2005 (age 20)	(Royal Dutch Football Association) Almere City
	MF	Giraynho Kluivert	May 23, 2005 (age 20)	(Royal Dutch Football Association) Almere City
	MF	Robinho Pinas		(Surinamese Football Association) Notch
	MF	Jean Pierre Tjoen-A-Choi		(Surinamese Football Association) Transvaal
	MF	Elvis With		(Surinamese Football Association) Leo Victor
	FW	Sheraino Kwasie		(Surinamese Football Association) Voorwaarts
	FW	Jair Lobles		(Surinamese Football Association) PVV
	FW	Donagay Misidjang		(Surinamese Football Association) Notch
	FW	Djaier Prijor	February 26, 2005 (age 21)	(Royal Dutch Football Association) PEC Zwolle
	FW	Jermaine Rijssel	March 25, 2005 (age 20)	(Royal Dutch Football Association) Volendam

== Former coaches ==
- 2010 - (Suriname) Harold Deyl
