= 2017 CONCACAF U-20 Championship squads =

The squad listings for the CONCACAF U-20 Championship were published on 10 February 2017.

== Group A ==
=== Antigua and Barbuda ===
Head coach: (Antigua and Barbuda) George Warner

No.	Pos.	Player	Date of birth (age)	Club
1	GK	Christian Corbett	31 January 1998 (aged 19)	(Antigua and Barbuda Football Association) Generation Next
2	DF	Jarmarlie Stevens	20 April 1997 (aged 19)	(Antigua and Barbuda Football Association) Old Road
3	DF	Vashami Allen	1 January 1997 (aged 20)	(Antigua and Barbuda Football Association) Fort Road
4	DF	Luther Wildin	3 December 1997 (aged 19)	(The Football Association) Notts County
5	DF	Matthew Hall	3 March 1998 (aged 18)	(Antigua and Barbuda Football Association) Fort Road F.C.
6	DF	Kalis Gore	11 November 1998 (aged 18)	Unattached (Note: CONCACAF document lists Kalis Gore as being contracted to Leicester City.)
7	FW	Shalon Knight	4 March 2000 (aged 16)	(Antigua and Barbuda Football Association) Sweets
8	MF	Andre Browne	13 January 1997 (aged 20)	(Antigua and Barbuda Football Association) Old Road
9	FW	Javorn Stevens	9 May 1998 (aged 18)	(United States Soccer Federation) Seattle Sounders FC 2
10	DF	Jacob Blackstock	26 August 1998 (aged 18)	(The Football Association) Banbury United
12	MF	Leroy Graham	7 December 1999 (aged 17)	(Antigua and Barbuda Football Association) Villa Lions
13	FW	Cristian Fernandez	6 July 1999 (aged 17)	(Antigua and Barbuda Football Association) Villa Lions
14	DF	Kendukar Challenger	24 January 1997 (aged 20)	(Antigua and Barbuda Football Association) Young Warriors
15	FW	Zayn Hakeem	15 February 1999 (aged 18)	(The Football Association) Mansfield Town
16	MF	Denie Henry	7 May 1998 (aged 18)	(Antigua and Barbuda Football Association) Parham
17	MF	Benedict Bowers	18 December 1997 (aged 19)	(The Football Association) Goole
18	MF	Elliot Webber	1 October 1998 (aged 18)	(The Football Association) Leicester City
19	DF	Elijah Jarvis	24 March 1999 (aged 17)	(United States Soccer Federation) Roberts Wesleyan College
20	GK	Kahendi Jackson	5 December 1998 (aged 18)	(Antigua and Barbuda Football Association) SAP
	MF	Ajani Thomas (Note: Originally, DJ Buffonge of Manchester United was called-up but the club refused to call the player up as the tournament does not take place on the FIFA calendar.)		(Antigua and Barbuda Football Association) Sweets

=== Canada ===
Head coach: (Canada) Rob Gale

No.	Pos.	Player	Date of birth (age)	Club
1	GK	Dayne St. Clair	9 May 1997 (aged 19)	(United States Soccer Federation) University of Maryland
2	DF	Zachary Brault-Guillard	30 December 1998 (aged 18)	(French Football Federation) Lyon
3	DF	Gabriel Boakye	26 February 1998 (aged 18)	(German Football Association) Energie Cottbus
4	DF	Kosovar Sadiki	27 August 1998 (aged 18)	(The Football Association) Stoke City
5	DF	Thomas Meilleur-Giguère	13 November 1997 (aged 19)	(Canadian Soccer Association) Ottawa Fury
6	MF	Liam Fraser	13 February 1998 (aged 19)	(Canadian Soccer Association) Toronto FC II
7	MF	Diego Gutiérrez	18 February 1997 (aged 19)	(Football Federation of Chile) Palestino
8	MF	Luca Uccello	17 June 1997 (aged 19)	(Canadian Soccer Association) Toronto FC II
9	FW	Dario Zanatta	24 May 1997 (aged 19)	(Scottish Football Association) Heart of Midlothian
10	MF	Tristan Borges	26 August 1998 (aged 18)	(Royal Dutch Football Association) Heerenveen
11	MF	Kris Twardek	8 March 1997 (aged 19)	(The Football Association) Millwall
12	FW	Shaan Hundal	14 July 1999 (aged 17)	(Canadian Soccer Association) Toronto FC II
13	MF	Dante Campbell	22 May 1999 (aged 17)	(Canadian Soccer Association) Toronto FC II
14	MF	Aidan Daniels	6 September 1998 (aged 18)	(Canadian Soccer Association) Toronto FC II
15	DF	Kamal Miller	16 May 1997 (aged 19)	(United States Soccer Federation) Syracuse University
16	MF	Emmanuel Zambazis	24 April 1997 (aged 19)	(Hellenic Football Federation) Iraklis
17	FW	Aymar Sigue	12 February 1997 (aged 20)	(United States Soccer Federation) Penn State University
18	GK	Thomas Hasal	1 January 1999 (aged 18)	(Canadian Soccer Association) Vancouver Whitecaps
19	FW	Liam Millar	27 September 1999 (aged 17)	(The Football Association) Liverpool
20	DF	Kadin Chung	5 September 1998 (aged 18)	(Canadian Soccer Association) Whitecaps FC 2

=== Honduras ===
Head coach: (Honduras) Carlos Tábora

No.	Pos.	Player	Date of birth (age)	Club
1	GK	Javier Delgado	6 November 1998 (aged 18)	(National Autonomous Federation of Football of Honduras) Honduras Progreso
2	DF	Denil Maldonado	25 May 1998 (aged 18)	(National Autonomous Federation of Football of Honduras) Motagua
3	DF	Wesly Decas	11 February 1999 (aged 18)	(National Autonomous Federation of Football of Honduras) Motagua
4	DF	Kenneth Hernández	26 May 1997 (aged 19)	(National Autonomous Federation of Football of Honduras) Victoria
5	DF	Dylan Andrade	8 March 1998 (aged 18)	(National Autonomous Federation of Football of Honduras) Platense
6	DF	Riky Zapata	23 November 1997 (aged 19)	(National Autonomous Federation of Football of Honduras) Real Sociedad
7	MF	José Reyes	5 November 1997 (aged 19)	(National Autonomous Federation of Football of Honduras) Olimpia
8	MF	Carlos Pineda	23 September 1997 (aged 19)	(National Autonomous Federation of Football of Honduras) Olimpia
9	MF	Foslyn Grant	4 October 1998 (aged 18)	(National Autonomous Federation of Football of Honduras) Motagua
10	MF	Rembrandt Flores	12 May 1997 (aged 19)	(National Autonomous Federation of Football of Honduras) Olimpia
11	FW	José Pinto	27 September 1997 (aged 19)	(National Autonomous Federation of Football of Honduras) Olimpia
12	GK	Michael Perelló	11 July 1998 (aged 18)	(National Autonomous Federation of Football of Honduras) Marathón
13	MF	José Quiroz	26 May 1997 (aged 19)	(National Autonomous Federation of Football of Honduras) Real España
14	MF	Sendel Cruz	13 December 1998 (aged 18)	(National Autonomous Federation of Football of Honduras) Juticalpa
15	DF	Jalex Sánchez	28 March 1997 (aged 19)	(National Autonomous Federation of Football of Honduras) Real España
16	DF	José García	21 September 1998 (aged 18)	(National Autonomous Federation of Football of Honduras) Victoria
17	FW	Byron Rodríguez	26 August 1997 (aged 19)	(National Autonomous Federation of Football of Honduras) Parrillas One
18	MF	Darixon Vuelto	15 January 1998 (aged 19)	(Royal Spanish Football Federation) Tenerife
19	FW	Douglas Martínez	5 June 1997 (aged 19)	(National Autonomous Federation of Football of Honduras) Vida
20	MF	Jorge Álvarez	28 January 1998 (aged 19)	(National Autonomous Federation of Football of Honduras) Olimpia

=== Mexico ===
Head coach: (Mexico) Marco Antonio Ruiz

No.	Pos.	Player	Date of birth (age)	Club
1	GK	Fernando Hernández	2 January 1998 (aged 19)	(Mexican Football Federation) Monterrey
2	DF	Diego Cortés	18 June 1998 (aged 18)	(Mexican Football Federation) Guadalajara
3	DF	Edson Álvarez	24 October 1997 (aged 19)	(Mexican Football Federation) América
4	DF	Joaquín Esquivel	7 January 1998 (aged 19)	(Mexican Football Federation) Pachuca
5	DF	Ulises Torres	17 February 1998 (aged 19)	(Mexican Football Federation) América
6	MF	Alan Cervantes	17 January 1998 (aged 19)	(Mexican Football Federation) Guadalajara
7	MF	Uriel Antuna	21 August 1997 (aged 19)	(Mexican Football Federation) Santos Laguna
8	MF	Pablo López	7 January 1998 (aged 19)	(Mexican Football Federation) Pachuca
9	FW	Ronaldo Cisneros	8 January 1997 (aged 20)	(Mexican Football Federation) Santos Laguna
10	FW	Eduardo Aguirre	3 August 1998 (aged 18)	(Mexican Football Federation) Santos Laguna
11	MF	Kevin Magaña	1 February 1998 (aged 19)	(Mexican Football Federation) Guadalajara
12	GK	Santiago Hernández	1 May 1997 (aged 19)	(Mexican Football Federation) Atlas
13	DF	Brayton Vázquez	5 May 1998 (aged 18)	(Mexican Football Federation) Atlas
14	DF	Juan Agüayo	11 March 1997 (aged 19)	(Mexican Football Federation) Guadalajara
15	DF	Alejandro Mayorga	29 May 1997 (aged 19)	(Mexican Football Federation) Guadalajara
16	MF	Francisco Córdova	12 July 1997 (aged 19)	(Mexican Football Federation) América
17	MF	Kevin Lara	18 April 1998 (aged 18)	(Mexican Football Federation) Santos Laguna
18	FW	Claudio Zamudio	30 March 1998 (aged 18)	(Mexican Football Federation) Monarcas Morelia
19	FW	Paolo Yrizar	6 October 1997 (aged 19)	(Mexican Football Federation) Querétaro
20	MF	Diego Aguilar	13 January 1997 (aged 20)	(Mexican Football Federation) Lobos BUAP

== Group B ==
=== Haiti ===
Head coach: (Haiti) Wilfrid Montilas

No.	Pos.	Player	Date of birth (age)	Club
1	GK	Isaac Rouaud-Simon	12 February 1998 (aged 19)	(French Football Federation) Le Mans
2	DF	Denso Ulysse	20 November 1998 (aged 18)	(Haitian Football Federation) Real Hope Academy
3	DF	Odilon Jerome	7 December 1998 (aged 18)	(Haitian Football Federation) Aigle Noir
4	DF	Fardyson Pierre	27 August 1998 (aged 18)	(Haitian Football Federation) Real Hope Academy
5	DF	Emerson Georges	27 September 1998 (aged 18)	(Haitian Football Federation) Baltimore
6	MF	Brian Chevreuil	26 February 1997 (aged 19)	(French Football Federation) Châteauroux
7	FW	Jimmy-Shammar Sanon	24 January 1997 (aged 20)	(Canadian Soccer Association) FC Montreal
8	FW	Jonel Désiré	12 February 1997 (aged 20)	(Haitian Football Federation) ASC
9	FW	Ronaldo Damus	12 September 1999 (aged 17)	(Haitian Football Federation) Real Hope Academy
10	FW	Roberto Badgio Louima	4 March 1997 (aged 19)	(Haitian Football Federation) Real Hope Academy
11	FW	Kenley Dede	18 May 1998 (aged 18)	(Haitian Football Federation) Don Bosco
13	MF	Wendy St Felix	1 October 1997 (aged 19)	(Haitian Football Federation) Aigle Noir
14	DF	Yvenet Noel	6 March 1997 (aged 19)	(Haitian Football Federation) Ouanaminthe
15	DF	Alessandro Campoy	7 June 1997 (aged 19)	(United States Soccer Federation) Weston Fury
16	MF	Abraham Duverger	28 January 1999 (aged 18)	Unattached
17	DF	Wilmond Oracius	18 March 1997 (aged 19)	(Brazilian Football Confederation) Viva Rio
19	FW	Stevenson Guillaume	2 June 1998 (aged 18)	(Haitian Football Federation) Racing
20	FW	Richelor Sprangers	10 February 1998 (aged 19)	(Royal Dutch Football Association) NAC Breda
	GK	John Wodney Paris	3 December 1997 (aged 19)	(Haitian Football Federation) Roulado
	MF	Clerveau Dutherson	29 January 1999 (aged 18)	(Haitian Football Federation) Valencia

=== Panama ===
Head coach: (Panama) Nelson Gallego

No.	Pos.	Player	Date of birth (age)	Club
1	GK	Aldo Ciel	3 December 1997 (aged 19)	(Panamanian Football Federation) Árabe Unido
2	DF	Jiovany Ramos	26 January 1997 (aged 20)	(Panamanian Football Federation) San Francisco
3	DF	Andrés Andrade Cedeño	16 October 1998 (aged 18)	(Panamanian Football Federation) San Francisco
4	DF	César Blackman Camarena	2 April 1998 (aged 18)	(Panamanian Football Federation) Chorrillo
5	MF	Ricardo Ávila	4 February 1997 (aged 20)	(Panamanian Football Federation) Chorrillo
6	DF	Javier Rivera Castillo	17 March 1998 (aged 18)	(Panamanian Football Federation) Tauro
7	MF	Chamell Asprilla (Note: Chamell Asprilla replaced the injured José Luis Rodríguez on 16 February prior to the tournament beginning.)	11 August 1998 (aged 18)	(Panamanian Football Federation) Árabe Unido
8	MF	Cristian Martínez	6 February 1997 (aged 20)	(United States Soccer Federation) Columbus Crew
9	FW	Ronaldo Córdoba	11 February 1998 (aged 19)	(Panamanian Football Federation) Tauro
10	MF	Andres Peñalba	8 July 1997 (aged 19)	(Panamanian Football Federation) Chorrillo
11	MF	Justin Simmons Samaniego	19 September 1997 (aged 19)	(Panamanian Football Federation) San Francisco
12	GK	Charlie Taylor	15 February 1997 (aged 20)	(The Football Association) Loughborough University (Note: Taylor was listed by CONCACAF as playing for "University of London" but in fact represents Loughborough University.)
13	DF	Jorge Gutierrez Cornejo	1 September 1998 (aged 18)	(Panamanian Football Federation) Tauro
14	MF	Jose Tejada	5 January 1998 (aged 19)	(Panamanian Football Federation) Tauro
15	MF	Adalberto Carrasquilla	28 November 1998 (aged 18)	(Panamanian Football Federation) Tauro
16	MF	Yair Jaen	16 March 1997 (aged 19)	(Panamanian Football Federation) Costa del Este
17	FW	Leandro Ávila Santamaria	11 January 1997 (aged 20)	(United States Soccer Federation) Iowa Western Community College
18	FW	Isidoro Hinestroza Hernandez	11 September 1997 (aged 19)	(Panamanian Football Federation) San Francisco
19	FW	Oliver Beckles Cooper	20 March 1998 (aged 18)	(Panamanian Football Federation) Tauro
20	DF	Josue Vergara	26 July 1999 (aged 17)	(Panamanian Football Federation) Plaza Amador

=== Saint Kitts and Nevis ===
Head coach: (Saint Kitts and Nevis) Anthony Isaac

No.	Pos.	Player	Date of birth (age)	Club
1	GK	Nathan Joseph Lescott	26 August 1999 (aged 17)	Unattached (Note: CONCACAF document lists Nathan Lescott as being contracted to Leicester City.)
2	DF	Javier Sutton	23 March 1997 (aged 19)	(St. Kitts and Nevis Football Association) Trinity Strikers
3	DF	Ezer Browne	13 August 1998 (aged 18)	(United States Soccer Federation) James Madison University
4	DF	Phillip Richardson	20 March 1997 (aged 19)	(St. Kitts and Nevis Football Association) St. Paul's United
5	MF	Kejauni David	6 October 1999 (aged 17)	(St. Kitts and Nevis Football Association) Newtown United
6	DF	Salas Cannonier	29 November 1997 (aged 19)	(St. Kitts and Nevis Football Association) St. Peters Strikers
7	MF	Ronaldo Belgrove	15 September 1998 (aged 18)	(St. Kitts and Nevis Football Association) Newtown United
8	MF	Yohannes Mitchum	6 April 1998 (aged 18)	(St. Kitts and Nevis Football Association) Newtown United
9	MF	Romario Martin	30 August 1999 (aged 17)	(The Football Association) Solihull Moors
10	FW	Delano Hodge	28 February 1997 (aged 19)	(St. Kitts and Nevis Football Association) Conaree
11	FW	Tahir Hanley	5 May 1997 (aged 19)	(St. Kitts and Nevis Football Association) Garden Hotspurs
12	DF	Yusuf Saunders	27 February 1997 (aged 19)	(St. Kitts and Nevis Football Association) Village Superstars
13	MF	Raheem Sommersall	5 July 1997 (aged 19)	(United States Soccer Federation) Appalachian State University
14	MF	Tyquan Terrell	16 April 1998 (aged 18)	(St. Kitts and Nevis Football Association) St. Peters Strikers
15	FW	Dakari Phipps	20 April 1997 (aged 19)	(St. Kitts and Nevis Football Association) Newtown United
16	DF	Xavier French	14 May 1997 (aged 19)	(St. Kitts and Nevis Football Association) SPD United
17	MF	Steve Archibald	19 July 1998 (aged 18)	(St. Kitts and Nevis Football Association) Garden Hotspurs
18	GK	Akimba Francis	13 January 1997 (aged 20)	(St. Kitts and Nevis Football Association) SPD United
19	MF	G'Vaune Amory	22 June 1997 (aged 19)	(St. Kitts and Nevis Football Association) Village Superstars
20	MF	Alex Charles	15 December 1998 (aged 18)	(St. Kitts and Nevis Football Association) Cayon Rockets

=== United States ===
Head coach: (United States) Tab Ramos

No.	Pos.	Player	Date of birth (age)	Club
1	GK	Jonathan Klinsmann	8 April 1997 (aged 19)	(United States Soccer Federation) University of California
2	DF	Marlon Fossey	9 September 1998 (aged 18)	(The Football Association) Fulham
3	MF	Danilo Acosta	7 November 1997 (aged 19)	(United States Soccer Federation) Real Salt Lake
4	DF	Tommy Redding	24 January 1997 (aged 20)	(United States Soccer Federation) Orlando City
5	DF	Erik Palmer-Brown	24 April 1997 (aged 19)	(United States Soccer Federation) Sporting Kansas City
6	DF	Justen Glad	28 February 1997 (aged 19)	(United States Soccer Federation) Real Salt Lake
7	MF	Eryk Williamson	11 June 1997 (aged 19)	(United States Soccer Federation) University of Maryland
8	MF	Tyler Adams	14 February 1999 (aged 18)	(United States Soccer Federation) New York Red Bulls
9	FW	Jeremy Ebobisse	14 February 1997 (aged 20)	(United States Soccer Federation) Portland Timbers
10	MF	Luca de la Torre	23 May 1998 (aged 18)	(The Football Association) Fulham
11	MF	Sebastian Saucedo	22 January 1997 (aged 20)	(United States Soccer Federation) Real Salt Lake
12	GK	JT Marcinkowski	9 May 1997 (aged 19)	(United States Soccer Federation) Georgetown University
13	DF	Auston Trusty	12 August 1998 (aged 18)	(United States Soccer Federation) Philadelphia Union
14	DF	Aaron Herrera	6 June 1997 (aged 19)	(United States Soccer Federation) University of New Mexico
15	MF	Jonathan González	13 April 1999 (aged 17)	(Mexican Football Federation) Monterrey
16	MF	Jeremiah Gutjahr	10 August 1997 (aged 19)	(United States Soccer Federation) Indiana University
17	FW	Brooks Lennon	22 September 1997 (aged 19)	(United States Soccer Federation) Real Salt Lake
18	FW	Emmanuel Sabbi	24 December 1997 (aged 19)	(Royal Spanish Football Federation) UD Las Palmas
19	FW	Coy Craft	23 May 1997 (aged 19)	(United States Soccer Federation) FC Dallas
20	MF	Jonathan Lewis	4 June 1997 (aged 19)	(United States Soccer Federation) New York City

== Group C ==
=== Bermuda ===
Head coach: (Bermuda) Kyle Lightbourne

No.	Pos.	Player	Date of birth (age)	Club
1	GK	Jahquill Hill	15 January 1997 (aged 20)	(The Football Association) Ilkeston F.C.
2	DF	Arhia Simons	11 July 1999 (aged 17)	(Bermuda Football Association) X-Roads Warriors F.C.
3	DF	David Jones	12 March 1997 (aged 19)	(The Football Association) Ilkeston F.C.
4	MF	Nathan Rego	6 February 1997 (aged 20)	(Bermuda Football Association) Somerset Cricket Club
5	DF	Tahzeiko Harris	6 May 1999 (aged 17)	(Bermuda Football Association) Somerset Cricket Club
6	MF	Amar Lewis	9 July 1998 (aged 18)	(Bermuda Football Association) Dandy Town Hornets
7	FW	Oneko Lowe	6 March 1998 (aged 18)	(Bermuda Football Association) Dandy Town Hornets
8	MF	Liam Evans	1 May 1997 (aged 19)	(Bermuda Football Association) Robin Hood
9	FW	Tehvan Tyrell	16 March 1997 (aged 19)	(The Football Association) Ilkeston F.C.
10	MF	Osagi Bascome	10 January 1999 (aged 18)	(The Football Association) Bristol City F.C.
11	FW	Jahkari Furbert	6 March 1999 (aged 17)	(Bermuda Football Association) Bermuda Athletic Association
12	GK	Detre Bell	8 March 1997 (aged 19)	(Bermuda Football Association) North Village Community Club
13	FW	Mazhye Burchall	28 January 1998 (aged 19)	(Bermuda Football Association) PHC Zebras
14	MF	Paul Douglas	7 August 1997 (aged 19)	(Bermuda Football Association) Bermuda Athletic Association
15	MF	Mikiel Thomas	8 November 1997 (aged 19)	(Bermuda Football Association) Devonshire Cougars
16	MF	Jahnazae Swan	9 June 1997 (aged 19)	
17	MF	Jaz Ratteray Smith	24 January 1997 (aged 20)	(Bermuda Football Association) Somerset Cricket Club
18	MF	Zenawi Bowen	16 February 1998 (aged 19)	
19	FW	Knory Scott	6 June 1999 (aged 17)	(Bermuda Football Association) North Village Community Club
20	MF	Milan Butterfield	24 January 1998 (aged 19)	(The Football Association) Walsall F.C.

The following were called-up but replaced before the tournament began:

No.	Pos.	Player	Date of birth (age)	Club
	DF	Azende Furbert	18 March 1998 (aged 18)	(Bermuda Football Association) North Village Community Club
	DF	Jahtino Richardson-Martin	23 December 1997 (aged 19)	(Bermuda Football Association) Dandy Town Hornets
	DF	Rai Sampson	4 December 1997 (aged 19)	(Bermuda Football Association) North Village Community Club

=== Costa Rica ===
Head coach: (Argentina) Marcelo Herrera

No.	Pos.	Player	Date of birth (age)	Club
1	GK	Mario Sequeira	9 January 1997 (aged 20)	(Costa Rican Football Federation) Deportivo Saprissa
2	DF	Diego Mesen	28 March 1999 (aged 17)	(Costa Rican Football Federation) L.D. Alajuelense
3	DF	Pablo Arboine	3 April 1998 (aged 18)	(Costa Rican Football Federation) Santos de Guápiles F.C.
4	FW	Ian Smith	6 March 1998 (aged 18)	(Swedish Football Association) Hammarby Fotboll (on loan from Santos de Guápiles F.C.)
5	DF	Esteban González	30 January 1998 (aged 19)	(Costa Rican Football Federation) Deportivo Saprissa
6	MF	Luis José Hernández Paniagua	7 February 1998 (aged 19)	(Costa Rican Football Federation) Deportivo Saprissa
7	FW	Kevin Masis	5 January 1998 (aged 19)	(Costa Rican Football Federation) Santos de Guápiles F.C.
8	FW	Jimmy Marin	8 October 1997 (aged 19)	(Costa Rican Football Federation) C.S. Herediano
9	FW	Andy Reyes	6 April 1999 (aged 17)	(Costa Rican Football Federation) A.D. Carmelita
10	FW	Jonathan Martinez	19 March 1998 (aged 18)	(Costa Rican Football Federation) A.D. Carmelita
11	FW	Randall Leal	14 January 1997 (aged 20)	(Royal Belgian Football Association) KV Mechelen
12	MF	Juan Arguedas	21 April 1997 (aged 19)	(Costa Rican Football Federation) A.D. Carmelita
13	MF	Esteban Sibaja Espinoza	22 November 1997 (aged 19)	(Costa Rican Football Federation) Belén F.C.
14	MF	Roberto Cordoba	16 July 1998 (aged 18)	(Costa Rican Football Federation) L.D. Alajuelense
15	FW	Bernald Alfaro	26 January 1997 (aged 20)	(Costa Rican Football Federation) A.D. Carmelita
16	MF	Marvin Loria	24 April 1997 (aged 19)	(Costa Rican Football Federation) Deportivo Saprissa
17	FW	Jostin Daly	23 April 1998 (aged 18)	(Costa Rican Football Federation) C.S. Herediano
18	GK	Alejandro Barrientos	11 February 1998 (aged 19)	(Costa Rican Football Federation) Belén F.C.
19	DF	Yostin Salinas	14 September 1998 (aged 18)	(Costa Rican Football Federation) Deportivo Saprissa
20	MF	Eduardo Juarez	22 September 1998 (aged 18)	(Costa Rican Football Federation) L.D. Alajuelense

=== El Salvador ===
Head coach: (El Salvador) Eduardo Lara

No.	Pos.	Player	Date of birth (age)	Club
1	GK	Mario González Martínez	20 May 1997 (aged 19)	(Salvadoran Football Federation) C.D. Luis Angel FIRPO
2	DF	Óscar Menjívar Oviedo	7 July 1997 (aged 19)	(Salvadoran Football Federation) C.D. UES
3	DF	Roberto Domínguez	9 May 1997 (aged 19)	(Salvadoran Football Federation) Santa Tecla F.C.
4	DF	Ronald Gómez	22 September 1998 (aged 18)	(Salvadoran Football Federation) C.D. Aguila
5	MF	Josué Santos Olivares	12 June 1997 (aged 19)	(Salvadoran Football Federation) C.D. Fas
6	MF	Diego Cartagena Martínez	15 April 1997 (aged 19)	(Salvadoran Football Federation) Turin F.C.
7	MF	Kevin Reyes Ortíz	28 August 1999 (aged 17)	(Salvadoran Football Federation) Santa Tecla F.C.
8	MF	Hector Quinteros García	11 December 1998 (aged 18)	(Salvadoran Football Federation) Georgia United
9	FW	Brayan Paz Ayala	14 November 1997 (aged 19)	(Salvadoran Football Federation) C.D. Aguila
10	FW	Marvin Márquez Ayala	12 March 1998 (aged 18)	(Salvadoran Football Federation) Alianza F.C.
11	MF	Jonathan Aguilar	12 December 1997 (aged 19)	(Salvadoran Football Federation) Turin F.C.
12	MF	José Enrique Contreras	1 February 1997 (aged 20)	(Salvadoran Football Federation) Alianza F.C.
13	MF	Fernando Castillo	9 July 1997 (aged 19)	(Salvadoran Football Federation) C.D. Fas
14	MF	Marcos Rodriguez	10 August 1997 (aged 19)	(Salvadoran Football Federation) Sonsonate F.C.
15	DF	Denilson Vidal Rosales	17 August 1997 (aged 19)	(Salvadoran Football Federation) C.D. Fas
16	DF	Diego Chavez	5 April 1997 (aged 19)	(Salvadoran Football Federation) Turin F.C.
17	MF	Walter Ayala Chiguila	5 October 1997 (aged 19)	(Salvadoran Football Federation) C.D. Once Lobos
18	GK	Alan Carrillo Berduo	25 November 1998 (aged 18)	(United States Soccer Federation) California Rush
19	FW	Josue Rivera Arevalo	9 May 1999 (aged 17)	(Salvadoran Football Federation) C.D. Fas
20	MF	Amilcar Bermudez	22 January 1997 (aged 20)	(Salvadoran Football Federation) C.D. Luis Angel FIRPO

=== Trinidad and Tobago ===
Head coach: (Trinidad and Tobago) Brian Williams

No.	Pos.	Player	Date of birth (age)	Club
1	GK	Denzil Smith	13 October 1999 (aged 17)	Unattached (Note: Denzil Smith listed by CONCACAF as being attached to Shiva Boys College)
2	DF	Isaiah Garcia	22 April 1998 (aged 18)	(Trinidad and Tobago Football Association) W Connection F.C.
3	DF	Kori Cupid	8 January 1997 (aged 20)	Unattached (Note: Kori Cupid is listed by CONCACAF as being attached to Presentation College)
4	DF	Shane Sandy	23 January 1997 (aged 20)	Unattached (Note: Shane Sandy is listed by CONCACAF as being attached to Naparima College)
5	DF	Taryk Sampson	5 March 1997 (aged 19)	(Trinidad and Tobago Football Association) Ma Pau Stars S.C.
6	DF	Simeon Bailey	27 January 1997 (aged 20)	Unattached (Note: Simeon Bailey listed by CONCACAF as being attached to Barataria South Secondary School)
7	MF	Morgan Bruce De Rouche	21 May 1998 (aged 18)	(The Football Association) Queens Park Rangers F.C.
8	MF	Kierron Mason	14 August 1998 (aged 18)	(Trinidad and Tobago Football Association) Marabella Crisis Centre
9	FW	Nicholas Dillon	25 March 1997 (aged 19)	(Trinidad and Tobago Football Association) Central F.C.
10	MF	Jabari Mitchell	1 May 1997 (aged 19)	(Trinidad and Tobago Football Association) W Connection F.C.
11	MF	Noah Powder	27 October 1998 (aged 18)	(United States Soccer Federation) New York Red Bulls II
12	MF	Joshua Sitney	11 January 1999 (aged 18)	(Trinidad and Tobago Football Association) Malta Carib Alcons
13	MF	Micah Lansiquot	19 May 1997 (aged 19)	Unattached (Note: Micah Lansiquot is listed by CONCACAF as being attached to East Mucurapo Secondary School)
14	FW	Josh Toussaint	8 July 1997 (aged 19)	(Trinidad and Tobago Football Association) St. Ann's Rangers F.C.
15	FW	Kathon St. Hillaire	5 November 1997 (aged 19)	Unattached (Note: Kathon St. Hillaire is listed by CONCACAF as being attached to St Anthonys College)
16	FW	Rushawn Murphy	7 October 1998 (aged 18)	Unattached (Note: Rushawn Murphy is listed by CONCACAF as being attached to Malick Senior Comprehensive)
17	MF	Stephon Marcano	1 October 1999 (aged 17)	Unattached (Note: Stephon Marcano is listed by CONCACAF as being attached to Fatima College)
18	FW	Joshua Leach	1 April 1997 (aged 19)	(Trinidad and Tobago Football Association) Police F.C.
19	FW	Taofik Lucas-Walker	16 April 1998 (aged 18)	(United States Soccer Federation) Virginia Commonwealth University
20	GK	Montel Joseph	22 January 1997 (aged 20)	(The Football Association) Boreham Wood F.C.
