= 2017 CONCACAF U-20 Championship qualifying =

The qualifying competitions for the 2017 CONCACAF U-20 Championship were handled by two regional of CONCACAF's bodies; the Caribbean Football Union (Caribbean zone) and the Central American Football Union (Central American zone).

Representative teams from Canada, Mexico and the United States automatically qualified for the final competition.

== Caribbean zone ==
2016 CFU Men's U-20 Tournament

Tournament details
- Host countries: St. Maarten; Trinidad and Tobago; Haiti; Dominican Republic; Curaçao (final round)
- Dates: 15 June – 30 October 2016
- Teams: 17 (total) (from 1 sub-confederation)

Final positions
- Champions: Haiti
- Runners-up: Antigua and Barbuda
- Third place: Bermuda
- Fourth place: Trinidad and Tobago

Tournament statistics
- Matches played: 40
- Goals scored: 146 (3.65 per match)
- Top scorer(s): (Haiti) Ronaldo Damus (6 goals)
- Best player(s): (Haiti) Roberto Louima
- Best goalkeeper: (Haiti) Jhon Paris

The details were announced in April 2016.

=== Teams ===
| Seeding | Teams | No. of teams |
|---|---|---|
| No participation | Aruba; Bahamas; Barbados; Bonaire; British Virgin Islands; French Guiana; Grenada; Guyana; Martinique; Montserrat; Saint Vincent and the Grenadines; Saint Martin; Suriname; U.S. Virgin Islands | 14 |
| Group stage entrants | Anguilla; Antigua and Barbuda; Bermuda; Cayman Islands; Cuba; Dominica; Dominican Republic; Guadeloupe; Haiti; Jamaica; Puerto Rico; Saint Kitts and Nevis; Saint Lucia; Sint Maarten; Trinidad and Tobago; Turks and Caicos Islands | 16 |
| Final round entrants | Curaçao | 1 |

=== First round ===
==== Group 1 ====
To be held 15–19 June 2016 and hosted in St. Maarten.

| Pos | Team | Pld | W | D | L | GF | GA | GD | Pts | Qualification |
|---|---|---|---|---|---|---|---|---|---|---|
| 1 | Antigua and Barbuda | 3 | 2 | 1 | 0 | 9 | 2 | +7 | 7 | Final round |
| 2 | Cuba | 3 | 2 | 0 | 1 | 8 | 3 | +5 | 6 | Final round |
| 3 | Puerto Rico | 3 | 1 | 1 | 1 | 11 | 3 | +8 | 4 | |
| 4 | Sint Maarten (H) | 3 | 0 | 0 | 3 | 0 | 20 | −20 | 0 | |

Source: CFU
(H) Hosts
15 June 2016

| Antigua and Barbuda | 2–1 | Cuba |
|---|---|---|
| Stevens 15', 24' | Report (CONCACAF); Report (CFU) | Yasmani 41' |

Raoul Illidge Sports Complex, Philipsburg
Referee: Juniel Adelina (Curaçao)
15 June 2016

| Sint Maarten | 0–9 | Puerto Rico |
|---|---|---|
| | Report (CONCACAF); Report (CFU) | De la Rosa 3', 47'; Rodríguez 12'; Rivera 45+2'; Osorio 60', 70'; O'Neill 68'; Carrillo 76' (pen.), 84' |

Raoul Illidge Sports Complex, Philipsburg
Referee: Tristley Bassue (Saint Kitts and Nevis)

17 June 2016

| Cuba | 2–1 | Puerto Rico |
|---|---|---|
| Diaz 1'; Godinez 70' | Report (CONCACAF); Report (CFU) | Cardona 18' (pen.) |

Raoul Illidge Sports Complex, Philipsburg
Referee: Moeth Gaymes (Saint Vincent and the Grenadines)
17 June 2016

| Sint Maarten | 0–6 | Antigua and Barbuda |
|---|---|---|
| | Report (CONCACAF); Report (CFU) | Browne 27'; V.Allen 30' (pen.); Henry 49', 51'; Wildin 79'; Hall 90+2' |

Raoul Illidge Sports Complex, Philipsburg
Referee: Mike Van de Sande (Curaçao)

19 June 2016

| Puerto Rico | 1–1 | Antigua and Barbuda |
|---|---|---|
| Osorio 21' | Report (CONCACAF); Report (CFU) | Stevens 2' |

Raoul Illidge Sports Complex, Philipsburg
Referee: Tristley Bassue (Saint Kitts and Nevis)
19 June 2016

| Sint Maarten | 0–5 | Cuba |
|---|---|---|
| | Report (CONCACAF); Report (CFU) | E.Puga 7'; Yasmani 9'; Morejon 68', 80'; Godinez 82' |

Raoul Illidge Sports Complex, Philipsburg
Referee: Mike Van de Sande (Curaçao)

==== Group 2 ====
To be held 15–19 June 2016 and hosted in Trinidad and Tobago.

| Pos | Team | Pld | W | D | L | GF | GA | GD | Pts | Qualification |
|---|---|---|---|---|---|---|---|---|---|---|
| 1 | Trinidad and Tobago (H) | 3 | 2 | 1 | 0 | 13 | 1 | +12 | 7 | Final round |
| 2 | Saint Lucia | 3 | 2 | 1 | 0 | 4 | 1 | +3 | 7 | Final round |
| 3 | Guadeloupe | 3 | 1 | 0 | 2 | 5 | 2 | +3 | 3 | |
| 4 | Turks and Caicos Islands | 3 | 0 | 0 | 3 | 0 | 18 | −18 | 0 | |

Source: CFU
(H) Hosts
15 June 2016

| Turks and Caicos Islands | 0–2 | Saint Lucia |
|---|---|---|
| | Report (CONCACAF); Report (CFU) | Wilfred 57'; Winter 70' |

Ato Boldon Stadium, Couva
Referee: Michel Raynel Rodríguez Roque (Cuba)
15 June 2016

| Trinidad and Tobago | 1–0 | Guadeloupe |
|---|---|---|
| Dass 48' | Report (CONCACAF); Report (CFU) |

Ato Boldon Stadium, Couva
Referee: Johannes Dolaini (Suriname)

17 June 2016

| Saint Lucia | 1–0 | Guadeloupe |
|---|---|---|
| Maryat 47' | Report (CONCACAF); Report (CFU) |

Ato Boldon Stadium, Couva
Referee: Kerry Skepple (Antigua and Barbuda)
17 June 2016

| Trinidad and Tobago | 11–0 | Turks and Caicos Islands |
|---|---|---|
| Dillon 11', 29', 49', 62', 65'; Hudson 15', 58'; Mason 46'; Powder 51'; Lansiquot 72'; Bruce-de-Rouche 83' | Report (CONCACAF); Report (CFU) |

Ato Boldon Stadium, Couva
Referee: Veralton Nembhard (Jamaica)

19 June 2016

| Guadeloupe | 5–0 | Turks and Caicos Islands |
|---|---|---|
| Macon 17', 30', 48'; Dupalan 51'; Bolivar 53' | Report (CONCACAF); Report (CFU) |

Ato Boldon Stadium, Couva
Referee: Michel Raynel Rodríguez Roque (Cuba)
19 June 2016

| Trinidad and Tobago | 1–1 | Saint Lucia |
|---|---|---|
| Hudson 64' | Report (CONCACAF); Report (CFU) | Joseph 39' |

Ato Boldon Stadium, Couva
Referee: Kerry Skepple (Antigua and Barbuda)

==== Group 3 ====
To be held 29 June – 3 July 2016 and hosted in Haiti.

| Pos | Team | Pld | W | D | L | GF | GA | GD | Pts | Qualification |
|---|---|---|---|---|---|---|---|---|---|---|
| 1 | Haiti (H) | 3 | 3 | 0 | 0 | 16 | 0 | +16 | 9 | Final round |
| 2 | Bermuda | 3 | 2 | 0 | 1 | 10 | 3 | +7 | 6 | Final round |
| 3 | Cayman Islands | 3 | 1 | 0 | 2 | 4 | 9 | −5 | 3 | |
| 4 | Anguilla | 3 | 0 | 0 | 3 | 1 | 19 | −18 | 0 | |

Source: CFU
(H) Hosts
29 June 2016

| Bermuda | 3–0 | Cayman Islands |
|---|---|---|
| Evans 20', 89'; Smith 53' | Report (CONCACAF); Report (CFU) |

Stade Sylvio Cator, Port-au-Prince
Referee: Keon Yorke (Trinidad and Tobago)
29 June 2016

| Haiti | 8–0 | Anguilla |
|---|---|---|
| Dede 21'; Richardson 29' (o.g.); Pierre 36'; Louima 45', 50'; Damus 48', 77'; Jerome 90+2' | Report (CONCACAF); Report (CFU) |

Stade Sylvio Cator, Port-au-Prince
Referee: Dwight Royal (Jamaica)

1 July 2016

| Cayman Islands | 4–1 | Anguilla |
|---|---|---|
| Scott 25'; Martinez 31'; Cruz 39'; Thomas 62' | Report (CONCACAF); Report (CFU) | Lake 90+3' |

Stade Sylvio Cator, Port-au-Prince
Referee: Rodphin Harris (Trinidad and Tobago)
1 July 2016

| Haiti | 3–0 | Bermuda |
|---|---|---|
| Louima 24'; Guillaume 34'; Chery 83' | Report (CONCACAF); Report (CFU) |

Stade Sylvio Cator, Port-au-Prince
Referee: Juan Carlos Hidalgo (Dominican Republic)

3 July 2016

| Anguilla | 0–7 | Bermuda |
|---|---|---|
| | Report (CONCACAF); Report (CFU) | Smith 2', 28'; Douglas 13'; Swan 54'; Bascome 59' (pen.); Jones 86'; Furbert 90+1' |

Stade Sylvio Cator, Port-au-Prince
Referee: Juan Carlos Hidalgo (Dominican Republic)
3 July 2016

| Haiti | 5–0 | Cayman Islands |
|---|---|---|
| Dede 44', 90+4'; Louima 60'; Guillaume 66'; Francois 84' | Report (CONCACAF); Report (CFU) |

Stade Sylvio Cator, Port-au-Prince
Referee: Rodphin Harris (Trinidad and Tobago)

==== Group 4 ====
To be held 15–19 June 2016 and hosted in Dominican Republic.

| Pos | Team | Pld | W | D | L | GF | GA | GD | Pts | Qualification |
|---|---|---|---|---|---|---|---|---|---|---|
| 1 | Saint Kitts and Nevis | 3 | 2 | 0 | 1 | 7 | 4 | +3 | 6 | Final round |
| 2 | Dominican Republic (H) | 3 | 2 | 0 | 1 | 6 | 3 | +3 | 6 | |
| 3 | Jamaica | 3 | 2 | 0 | 1 | 4 | 4 | 0 | 6 | |
| 4 | Dominica | 3 | 0 | 0 | 3 | 3 | 9 | −6 | 0 | |

Source: CFU
(H) Hosts
15 June 2016

| Jamaica | 2–1 | Dominica |
|---|---|---|
| Nicholson 46', 61' | Report (CONCACAF); Report (CFU) | Lander 24' |

Estadio Panamericano, San Cristóbal
Referee: Sherwin Moore (Guyana)
15 June 2016

| Dominican Republic | 2–1 | Saint Kitts and Nevis |
|---|---|---|
| Rodríguez 52'; Jiménez 74' | Report (CONCACAF); Report (CFU) | Hanley 42' |

Estadio Panamericano, San Cristóbal
Referee: Gianni Ascani (Turks and Caicos Islands)

17 June 2016

| Jamaica | 0–2 | Saint Kitts and Nevis |
|---|---|---|
| | Report (CONCACAF); Report (CFU) | Hanley 60', 83' |

Estadio Panamericano, San Cristóbal
Referee: Adzer Arisnat (Haiti)
17 June 2016

| Dominican Republic | 3–0 | Dominica |
|---|---|---|
| Rodríguez 62'; Polanco 86'; Japa 90' | Report (CONCACAF); Report (CFU) |

Estadio Panamericano, San Cristóbal
Referee: Swason Owen (Cayman Islands)

19 June 2016

| Saint Kitts and Nevis | 4–2 | Dominica |
|---|---|---|
| Amory 14'; Archibald 43'; Hanley 72'; Sutton 77' | Report (CONCACAF); Report (CFU) | Jolly 68'; Augustine 70' |

Estadio Panamericano, San Cristóbal
Referee: Sherwin Moore (Guyana)
19 June 2016

| Dominican Republic | 1–2 | Jamaica |
|---|---|---|
| Polanco 86' | Report (CONCACAF); Report (CFU) | Nicholson 19'; Adamolekun 70' |

Estadio Panamericano, San Cristóbal
Referee: Gianni Ascani (Turks and Caicos Islands)

==== Ranking of second-placed teams ====
Three runners-up from the group stage (best three group runners-up) will also qualify for the final round.

| Pos | Grp | Team | Pld | W | D | L | GF | GA | GD | Pts | Qualification |
|---|---|---|---|---|---|---|---|---|---|---|---|
| 1 | 2 | Saint Lucia | 3 | 2 | 1 | 0 | 4 | 1 | +3 | 7 | Final round |
| 2 | 3 | Bermuda | 3 | 2 | 0 | 1 | 10 | 3 | +7 | 6 | Final round |
| 3 | 1 | Cuba | 3 | 2 | 0 | 1 | 8 | 3 | +5 | 6 | Final round |
| 4 | 4 | Dominican Republic | 3 | 2 | 0 | 1 | 6 | 3 | +3 | 6 | |

Source: CFU

=== Final round ===
To be held 21–30 October 2016 and hosted in Curaçao.

==== Group stage ====
===== Group A =====
| Pos | Team | Pld | W | D | L | GF | GA | GD | Pts | Qualification |
|---|---|---|---|---|---|---|---|---|---|---|
| 1 | Antigua and Barbuda | 3 | 2 | 1 | 0 | 6 | 4 | +2 | 7 | Semi-finals and 2017 CONCACAF U-20 Championship |
| 2 | Bermuda | 3 | 1 | 1 | 1 | 6 | 5 | +1 | 4 | Semi-finals and 2017 CONCACAF U-20 Championship |
| 3 | Saint Kitts and Nevis | 3 | 1 | 1 | 1 | 6 | 6 | 0 | 4 | 2017 CONCACAF U-20 Championship |
| 4 | Curaçao (H) | 3 | 0 | 1 | 2 | 2 | 5 | −3 | 1 | |

Source: CFU
(H) Hosts
21 October 2016
18:00

| Bermuda | 3–1 | Saint Kitts and Nevis |
|---|---|---|
| Scott 26'; Tyrell 30', 37' | Report (CONCACAF); Report (CFU) | Hanley 17' |

Ergilio Hato Stadium, Willemstad
Referee: Sherwin Moore (Guyana)
21 October 2016
20:15

| Curaçao | 0–1 | Antigua and Barbuda |
|---|---|---|
| | Report (CONCACAF); Report (CFU) | Stevens 86' |

Ergilio Hato Stadium, Willemstad
Referee: Rodphin Harris (Trinidad and Tobago)

23 October 2016
18:00

| Saint Kitts and Nevis | 2–2 | Antigua and Barbuda |
|---|---|---|
| Hodge 9'; Hanley 48' | Report (CONCACAF); Report (CFU) | Stevens 23'; Wildin 86' |

Ergilio Hato Stadium, Willemstad
Referee: Owen Dolaini (Suriname)
23 October 2016
20:30

| Curaçao | 1–1 | Bermuda |
|---|---|---|
| Schores 32' | Report (CONCACAF); Report (CFU) | Tyrell 79' |

Ergilio Hato Stadium, Willemstad
Referee: Kevin Morrison (Jamaica)

25 October 2016
18:00

| Antigua and Barbuda | 3–2 | Bermuda |
|---|---|---|
| Hakeem 1', 11'; Stevens 40' | Report (CONCACAF); Report (CFU) | Burchall 53', 86' |

Ergilio Hato Stadium, Willemstad
Referee: Javier Santos (Puerto Rico)
25 October 2016
20:30

| Curaçao | 1–3 | Saint Kitts and Nevis |
|---|---|---|
| Cijntje 42' | Report (CONCACAF); Report (CFU) | Sutton 23'; Hodge 67'; Phipps 76' |

Ergilio Hato Stadium, Willemstad
Referee: Rodphin Harris (Trinidad and Tobago)

===== Group B =====
| Pos | Team | Pld | W | D | L | GF | GA | GD | Pts | Qualification |
|---|---|---|---|---|---|---|---|---|---|---|
| 1 | Haiti | 3 | 2 | 1 | 0 | 7 | 2 | +5 | 7 | Semi-finals and 2017 CONCACAF U-20 Championship |
| 2 | Trinidad and Tobago | 3 | 1 | 2 | 0 | 4 | 0 | +4 | 5 | Semi-finals and 2017 CONCACAF U-20 Championship |
| 3 | Cuba | 3 | 0 | 2 | 1 | 2 | 3 | −1 | 2 | |
| 4 | Saint Lucia | 3 | 0 | 1 | 2 | 2 | 10 | −8 | 1 | |

Source: CFU
22 October 2016
18:00

| Haiti | 5–1 | Saint Lucia |
|---|---|---|
| Louima 6'; Damus 23', 83', 86'; Dede 78' | Report (CONCACAF); Report (CFU) | Lionel 80' |

Ergilio Hato Stadium, Willemstad
Referee: Wilson Da Costa (Bahamas)
22 October 2016
20:15

| Trinidad and Tobago | 0–0 | Cuba |
|---|---|---|
| | Report (CONCACAF); Report (CFU) |

Ergilio Hato Stadium, Willemstad
Referee: Javier Santos (Puerto Rico)

24 October 2016
18:00

| Saint Lucia | 0–4 | Trinidad and Tobago |
|---|---|---|
| | Report (CONCACAF); Report (CFU) | Dillon 5', 28', 70'; Power 65' |

Ergilio Hato Stadium, Willemstad
Referee: Swason Owen (Cayman Islands)
24 October 2016
20:30

| Haiti | 2–1 | Cuba |
|---|---|---|
| Sanon 6'; Désiré 80' | Report (CONCACAF); Report (CFU) | Tuero 68' |

Ergilio Hato Stadium, Willemstad
Referee: Sandy Vasquez Vargas (Dominican Republic)

26 October 2016
18:00

| Cuba | 1–1 | Saint Lucia |
|---|---|---|
| Guerra 21' | Report (CONCACAF); Report (CFU) | Aranda 84' (o.g.) |

Ergilio Hato Stadium, Willemstad
Referee: Wilson Da Costa (Bahamas)
26 October 2016
20:30

| Trinidad and Tobago | 0–0 | Haiti |
|---|---|---|
| | Report (CONCACAF); Report (CFU) |

Ergilio Hato Stadium, Willemstad
Referee: Sherwin Moore (Guyana)

==== Ranking of third-placed teams ====
The best third-placed team from the final round group stage also qualified for the 2017 CONCACAF U-20 Championship.

| Pos | Grp | Team | Pld | W | D | L | GF | GA | GD | Pts | Qualification |
|---|---|---|---|---|---|---|---|---|---|---|---|
| 1 | A | Saint Kitts and Nevis | 3 | 1 | 1 | 1 | 6 | 6 | 0 | 4 | 2017 CONCACAF U-20 Championship |
| 2 | B | Cuba | 3 | 0 | 2 | 1 | 2 | 3 | −1 | 2 | |

Source: CFU

==== Knockout stage ====
Semi-finals
28 October - Ergilio Hato Stadium
Antigua and Barbuda (p) | 0 (5)
Trinidad and Tobago | 0 (4)
28 October - Ergilio Hato Stadium
Haiti | 3
Bermuda | 0

Final
30 October - Ergilio Hato Stadium
Antigua and Barbuda | 0
Haiti | 4
Third place
30 October - Ergilio Hato Stadium
Trinidad and Tobago | 1
Bermuda | 2

===== Semi-finals =====
28 October 2016
18:00

| Antigua and Barbuda | 0–0 | Trinidad and Tobago |
|---|---|---|
| | Report (CONCACAF); Report (CFU) |
Penalties
| | 5–4 |

Ergilio Hato Stadium, Willemstad
Referee: Swason Owen (Cayman Islands)

28 October 2016
20:15

| Haiti | 3–0 | Bermuda |
|---|---|---|
| Désiré 6'; Damus 47'; Louima 63' | Report (CONCACAF); Report (CFU) |

Ergilio Hato Stadium, Willemstad
Referee: Rodphin Harris (Trinidad and Tobago)

===== Third-place playoff =====
30 October 2016
18:00

| Trinidad and Tobago | 1–2 | Bermuda |
|---|---|---|
| Toussaint 49' | Report (CONCACAF); Report (CFU) | Scott 44'; Thomas 88' |

Ergilio Hato Stadium, Willemstad
Referee: Sherwin Moore (Guyana)

===== Final =====
30 October 2016
20:15

| Antigua and Barbuda | 0–4 | Haiti |
|---|---|---|
| | Report (CONCACAF); Report (CFU) | Louima 21', 38'; Damus 47', 85' |

Ergilio Hato Stadium, Willemstad
Referee: Javier Santos (Puerto Rico)

==== Awards ====
Golden Boot of Finals

- (Haiti) Ronaldo Damus (6 goals)

MVP

- (Haiti) Roberto Louima

Golden Glove

- (Haiti) Jhon Paris

Golden Boot of Tournaments

- (Haiti) Ronaldo Damus (8 goals)
- (Haiti) Roberto Louima (8 goals)
- (Trinidad and Tobago) Nicholas Dillon (8 goals)

== Goalscorers ==
8 goals

- (Haiti) Ronaldo Damus
- (Haiti) Roberto Louima
- (Trinidad and Tobago) Nicholas Dillon

6 goals

- (Antigua and Barbuda) Javorn Stevens
- (Saint Kitts and Nevis) Tahir Hanley

4 goals

- (Haiti) Kenley Dede

3 goals

- (Bermuda) Jaz Ratteray Smith
- (Bermuda) Tehvan Tyrell
- (Guadeloupe) Yvann Macon
- (Jamaica) Shamar Nicholson
- (Puerto Rico) Jeimax Osorio
- (Trinidad and Tobago) Isaiah Hudson

2 goals

- (Antigua and Barbuda) Denie Henry
- (Antigua and Barbuda) Luther Wildin
- (Antigua and Barbuda) Zayn Hakeem
- (Bermuda) Liam Evans
- (Bermuda) Knory Scott
- (Bermuda) Mazhyze Burchall
- (Cuba) Lazaro Yasmani
- (Cuba) Yoan Godinez
- (Cuba) Alejandro Morejon
- (Dominican Republic) Manny Rodríguez
- (Dominican Republic) Víctor Polanco
- (Haiti) Stevenson Guillaume
- (Haiti) Jonel Désiré
- (Puerto Rico) Javier De la Rosa
- (Puerto Rico) Carmelo Carrillo
- (Saint Kitts and Nevis) Javier Sutton
- (Saint Kitts and Nevis) Delano Hodge
- (Trinidad and Tobago) Noah Powder

1 goal

- (Anguilla) Tyrique Lake
- (Antigua and Barbuda) Jermaine Browne
- (Antigua and Barbuda) Vashami Allen
- (Antigua and Barbuda) Matthew Hall
- (Bermuda) Paul Douglas
- (Bermuda) Jahnaze Swan
- (Bermuda) Osagi Bascome
- (Bermuda) Ahkari Furbert
- (Bermuda) Mikiel Thomas
- (Cayman Islands) Zachary Scott
- (Cayman Islands) Sebastìan Martinez
- (Cayman Islands) Michael Martin Scott
- (Cayman Islands) Leighton Thomas
- (Cuba) Luis Diaz
- (Cuba) Eduard Puga
- (Cuba) Lazano Tuero
- (Cuba) Darien Guerra
- (Curaçao) Leery Schores
- (Curaçao) Jeremy Cijntje
- (Dominica) Zion Lander
- (Dominica) Fitz Jolly
- (Dominica) Dillon Augustine
- (Dominican Republic) Arismendy Jiménez
- (Dominican Republic) Erick Japa
- (Guadeloupe) Giovanni Dupalan
- (Guadeloupe) Dimitri Bolivar
- (Haiti) Leverton Pierre
- (Haiti) Odilon Jerome
- (Haiti) Miche Chery
- (Haiti) Jean Jean Francois
- (Haiti) Jimmy-Shammar Sanon
- (Jamaica) Nathaniel Adamolekun
- (Puerto Rico) José Rodríguez
- (Puerto Rico) Andre Rivera
- (Puerto Rico) Juan O'Neill
- (Puerto Rico) Nicolás Cardona
- (Saint Kitts and Nevis) Steve Archibald
- (Saint Kitts and Nevis) Dakarai Phipps
- (Saint Lucia) Antoine Wilfred
- (Saint Lucia) Nyrone Winter
- (Saint Lucia) Ryi Maryat
- (Saint Lucia) Cassius Joseph
- (Saint Lucia) Keeroy Lionel
- (Trinidad and Tobago) Jarred Dass
- (Trinidad and Tobago) Kierron Mason
- (Trinidad and Tobago) Micah Lasiquot
- (Trinidad and Tobago) Morgan Brouce-de-Rouche
- (Trinidad and Tobago) Josh Toussaint

Own goals

- (Anguilla) Keanu Richardson (against Trinidad)
- (Cuba) Ronald Aranda (against Saint Lucia)

== Central American zone ==
2016 CONCACAF U-20 Championship qualifying (Central American zone)

Tournament details
- Host country: Panama
- Dates: 8–16 July 2016
- Teams: 6 (from 1 sub-confederation)

Final positions
- Champions: Honduras
- Runners-up: El Salvador
- Third place: Guatemala
- Fourth place: Panama

Tournament statistics
- Matches played: 10
- Goals scored: 29 (2.9 per match)
- Top scorer(s): (Panama) Leandro Ávila (3 goals)

The format is a single round-robin stage. Costa Rica qualified for the CONCACAF U-20 Championship as hosts and did not enter the qualifying competition. Belize withdrew. Guatemala were prevented from entering the 2017 CONCACAF U-20 Championship due to FIFA suspending National Football Federation of Guatemala. Fourth place Panama qualified in their place.

| Pos | Team | Pld | W | D | L | GF | GA | GD | Pts | Qualification |
|---|---|---|---|---|---|---|---|---|---|---|
| 1 | Honduras | 4 | 2 | 2 | 0 | 7 | 4 | +3 | 8 | 2017 CONCACAF U-20 Championship |
| 2 | El Salvador | 4 | 2 | 1 | 1 | 9 | 4 | +5 | 7 | 2017 CONCACAF U-20 Championship |
| 3 | Guatemala | 4 | 1 | 2 | 1 | 5 | 5 | 0 | 5 | Disqualified due to FIFA suspension |
| 4 | Panama (H) | 4 | 1 | 1 | 2 | 7 | 4 | +3 | 4 | 2017 CONCACAF U-20 Championship |
| 5 | Nicaragua | 4 | 1 | 0 | 3 | 1 | 12 | −11 | 3 | |
| 6 | Belize | 0 | 0 | 0 | 0 | 0 | 0 | 0 | 0 | Withdrew |

Source: UNCAF
(H) Hosts
8 July 2016
17:00

| Guatemala | 2–2 | Honduras |
|---|---|---|
| Valdizon 5'; García 42' | Report (CONCACAF); Report (UNCAF) | Grant 45+1'; Cruz 47' |

Estadio Maracaná, Panama City
Referee: Allen Quiroz (Costa Rica)
8 July 2016
20:00

| Panama | 6–0 | Nicaragua |
|---|---|---|
| Blackman 36'; L. Ávila 48', 53', 56'; Hinestroza 67', 89' | Report (CONCACAF); Report (UNCAF) |

Estadio Maracaná, Panama City
Referee: Marlon Mejia (El Salvador)

10 July 2016
17:00

| Honduras | 2–1 | El Salvador |
|---|---|---|
| Ávila 10'; Reyes 68' | Report (CONCACAF); Report (UNCAF) | Contreras 25' |

Estadio Maracaná, Panama City
Referee: Oscar Davila (Nicaragua)
10 July 2016
20:00

| Panama | 0–1 | Guatemala |
|---|---|---|
| | Report (CONCACAF); Report (UNCAF) | Reyes 68' (pen.) |

Estadio Maracaná, Panama City
Referee: Oscar Moncada (Honduras)

12 July 2016
17:00

| Nicaragua | 0–2 | Honduras |
|---|---|---|
| | Report (CONCACAF); Report (UNCAF) | Cruz 73'; Álvarez 88' |

Estadio Maracaná, Panama City
Referee: Juan Guerra (Guatemala)
12 July 2016
20:00

| Guatemala | 2–2 | El Salvador |
|---|---|---|
| Altán 29'; Martínez 54' (pen.) | Report (CONCACAF); Report (UNCAF) | Márquez 22' (pen.); Paz 79' |

Estadio Maracaná, Panama City
Referee: Oscar Moncada (Honduras)

14 July 2016
17:00

| El Salvador | 4–0 | Nicaragua |
|---|---|---|
| Rodríguez 26'; Castro 32'; Reyes 63'; Domínguez 71' | Report (CONCACAF); Report (UNCAF) |

Estadio Maracaná, Panama City
Referee: Allen Quiroz (Costa Rica)
14 July 2016
20:00

| Panama | 1–1 | Honduras |
|---|---|---|
| R. Ávila 65' (pen.) | Report (CONCACAF); Report (UNCAF) | Flores 78' (pen.) |

Estadio Maracaná, Panama City
Referee: Oscar Davila (Nicaragua)

16 July 2016
17:00

| Nicaragua | 1–0 | Guatemala |
|---|---|---|
| Jarquín 72' | Report (CONCACAF); Report (UNCAF) |

Estadio Maracaná, Panama City
Referee: Marlon Mejia (El Salvador)
16 July 2016
20:00

| Panama | 0–2 | El Salvador |
|---|---|---|
| | Report (CONCACAF); Report (UNCAF) | Rosales 16'; Domínguez 59' (pen.) |

Estadio Maracaná, Panama City
Referee: Juan Guerra (Guatemala)
