= 2017 CONCACAF U-20 Championship =

Premundial CONCACAF Sub-20 2017 (in Spanish)

Tournament details
- Host country: Costa Rica
- Dates: 17 February – 5 March
- Teams: 12 (from 1 confederation)
- Venues: 2 (in 2 host cities)

Final positions
- Champions: United States (1st title)
- Runners-up: Honduras

Tournament statistics
- Matches played: 25
- Goals scored: 74 (2.96 per match)
- Top scorer: (Mexico) Ronaldo Cisneros (6 goals)
- Best player: (United States) Erik Palmer-Brown
- Best goalkeeper: (United States) Jonathan Klinsmann
- Fair play award: Mexico

The 2017 CONCACAF Under-20 Championship was the fifth edition of the CONCACAF Under-20 Championship (26th edition if all eras included), the men's under-20 international football tournament organized by CONCACAF. It was hosted in Costa Rica between 17 February and 5 March 2017.

The competition determined the four CONCACAF representatives at the 2017 FIFA U-20 World Cup in South Korea. The United States, Mexico, Honduras, and Costa Rica qualified.

The tournament also determined which two Caribbean nations participate in the 2018 Central American and Caribbean Games.

== Qualification ==
Team	Qualification	Appearances	Previous best performances	FIFA U-20 World Cup Participations
North American zone
Canada	Automatic	22nd	Champions (1986, 1996)	8
Mexico (TH)	Automatic	25th	Champions (1962, 1970, 1973, 1974, 1976, 1978, 1980, 1984, 1990, 1992, 2011, 2013, 2015)	14
United States	Automatic	23rd	Runners-up (1980, 1982, 1986, 1992, 2009, 2013)	14
Central American zone qualified through the Central America qualifying
Costa Rica	Host nation	19th	Champions (1988, 2009)	8
Honduras	First place	18th	Champions (1982, 1994)	6
El Salvador	Second place	16th	Champions (1964)	1
Panama (Note: On 28 October 2016, FIFA suspended the National Football Federation of Guatemala for political interference by the Government of Guatemala. Until the suspension is lifted, Guatemalan teams are not permitted to participate in international competitions. CONCACAF had set the deadline of 20 November 2016 for the suspension to be lifted, otherwise by rule, Guatemala would be disqualified from the 2017 CONCACAF U-20 Championship, and any replacement team or revision to the tournament format would be discussed once the deadline had passed. On 22 November, CONCACAF announced that Panama, fourth place in Central America qualifying, would take the place of Guatemala, third place in Central America qualifying.)	Fourth place	10th	Runner-up (2015)	5
Caribbean zone qualified through the Caribbean qualifying
Antigua and Barbuda	Group A winner	3rd	First Round (1980, 1986)	0
Bermuda	Group A runner-up	12th	Second Round (1974, 1980)	0
Haiti	Group B winner	8th	Second Round (1978)	0
Trinidad and Tobago	Group B runner-up	19th	Runners-up (1990)	2
Saint Kitts and Nevis	Best Third Place	2nd	First Round (2007)	0

== Venues ==
2017 CONCACAF U-20 Championship is located in Costa Rica	San José	
2017 CONCACAF U-20 Championship is located in Costa Rica	Estadio Nacional	Estadio Ricardo Saprissa Aymá
2017 CONCACAF U-20 Championship is located in Costa Rica	Capacity: 35,175	Capacity: 23,112

== Draw ==
The draw took place on November 29, 2016 at 18:00 CST (UTC−6) at El Cubo, Estadio Nacional, San José, Costa Rica, and was streamed live via CONCACAF.com.

Different from previous tournaments, the 12 teams were drawn into three groups of four teams in the group stage. Costa Rica, Mexico and the United States were seeded into each of the three groups.

- Mexico, as champions of the 2015 CONCACAF U-20 Championship, were seeded in position A1.
- United States, as the best-ranked CONCACAF team in the 2015 FIFA U-20 World Cup, were seeded in position B1.
- Costa Rica, as hosts, were seeded in position C1.

The remaining nine teams were allocated to pots 2–4 designed to ensure balanced and competitive groups weighted equally by region. They were drawn in order and placed in the group position drawn from Pots A, B and C.

Pot 1	Pot 2	Pot 3	Pot 4
Mexico; United States; Costa Rica	Panama; Honduras; El Salvador	Canada; Trinidad and Tobago; Haiti	Antigua and Barbuda; Bermuda; Saint Kitts and Nevis

The top two teams from each group in the group stage advance to the classification stage, where the six teams are drawn into two groups of three teams. The positions of each group winner and runner-up from the group stage were then drawn in group pairs, randomly into the two groups (D and E) for the classification stage.

The top two teams from each group in the classification stage qualify for the 2017 FIFA U-20 World Cup, with the group winners also advancing to the final to decide the champions of the CONCACAF U-20 Championship.

== Squads ==
Each squad can contain 20 players (including two goalkeepers).

== Group stage ==
The top two teams from each group in the group stage advance to the classification stage.

Tiebreakers (for both group stage and classification stage)

The teams are ranked according to points (3 points for a win, 1 point for a draw, 0 points for a loss). If tied on points, tiebreakers are applied in the following order:

1. Greater number of points in matches between the tied teams;
2. Greater goal difference in matches between the tied teams (if more than two teams finish equal on points);
3. Greater number of goals scored in matches among the tied teams (if more than two teams finish equal in points);
4. Greater goal difference in all group matches;
5. Greater number of goals scored in all group matches;
6. Drawing of lots.

All times are local, CST (UTC−6).

=== Group A ===
Pos	Team	Pld	W	D	L	GF	GA	GD	Pts	Qualification
1	Mexico	3	3	0	0	9	0	+9	9	Classification stage
2	Honduras	3	2	0	1	5	2	+3	6	Classification stage
3	Canada	3	1	0	2	2	6	−4	3	
4	Antigua and Barbuda	3	0	0	3	1	9	−8	0	

Source: CONCACAF
Rules for classification: Group stage tiebreakers
17 February 2017
17:30

Honduras	1–0	Canada
Álvarez 77'	Report

Estadio Ricardo Saprissa Aymá, Tibás
Referee: Óscar Reyna (Guatemala)
17 February 2017
20:00

Mexico	3–0	Antigua and Barbuda
Cisneros 2', 45+1'; Allen 15' (o.g.)	Report

Estadio Ricardo Saprissa Aymá, Tibás
Referee: Javier Santos (Puerto Rico)

20 February 2017
17:00

Antigua and Barbuda	1–4	Honduras
Wildin 57'	Report	Jar. Stevens 8' (o.g.); Martínez 47'; Vuelto 60'; Álvarez 83'

Estadio Nacional, San José
Referee: Jafeth Perea (Panama)
20 February 2017
19:30

Mexico	5–0	Canada
Córdova 36'; Cisneros 40', 65'; Zamudio 82'; Aguirre 90+2'	Report

Estadio Nacional, San José
Referee: Marlon Mejía (El Salvador)

23 February 2017
14:30

Antigua and Barbuda	0–2	Canada
	Report	Twardek 23'; Hundal 90'

Estadio Ricardo Saprissa Aymá, Tibás
Referee: Óscar Reyna (Guatemala)
23 February 2017
17:00

Mexico	1–0	Honduras
Cisneros 67'	Report

Estadio Ricardo Saprissa Aymá, Tibás
Referee: Ismail Eifath (United States)

=== Group B ===
Pos	Team	Pld	W	D	L	GF	GA	GD	Pts	Qualification
1	Panama	3	3	0	0	8	1	+7	9	Classification stage
2	United States	3	2	0	1	8	3	+5	6	Classification stage
3	Haiti	3	1	0	2	7	8	−1	3	
4	Saint Kitts and Nevis	3	0	0	3	2	13	−11	0	

Source: CONCACAF
Rules for classification: Group stage tiebreakers
18 February 2017
12:00

Saint Kitts and Nevis	1–5	Haiti
Sutton 54'	Report	Sanon 5'; Chevreuil 24'; Campoy 48'; Désiré 86'; Damus 90+4'

Estadio Ricardo Saprissa Aymá, Tibás
Referee: Drew Fischer (Canada)
18 February 2017
14:30

United States	0–1	Panama
	Report	L. Ávila 37'

Estadio Ricardo Saprissa Aymá, Tibás
Referee: Armando Castro (Honduras)

21 February 2017
14:00

Panama	4–0	Saint Kitts and Nevis
Andrade 39'; L. Ávila 48'; R. Ávila 57' (pen.), 65'	Report

Estadio Nacional, San José
Referee: Henry Bejarano (Costa Rica)
21 February 2017
16:30

United States	4–1	Haiti
Lennon 28' (pen.), 53', 58' de la Torre 52'	Report	Dede 15'

Estadio Nacional, San José
Referee: Valdin Legister (Jamaica)

24 February 2017
14:00

Panama	3–1	Haiti
R. Ávila 12' (pen.), 73' (pen.); L. Ávila 88'	Report	Désiré 36'

Estadio Ricardo Saprissa Aymá, Tibás
Referee: Armando Castro (Honduras)
24 February 2017
16:30

United States	4–1	Saint Kitts and Nevis
Lennon 16'; Lewis 20'; Saucedo 35', 41'	Report	Martin 77'

Estadio Ricardo Saprissa Aymá, Tibás
Referee: Marlon Mejía (El Salvador)

=== Group C ===
Pos	Team	Pld	W	D	L	GF	GA	GD	Pts	Qualification
1	El Salvador	3	2	0	1	5	3	+2	6	Classification stage
2	Costa Rica (H)	3	2	0	1	3	2	+1	6	Classification stage
3	Trinidad and Tobago	3	1	1	1	3	3	0	4	
4	Bermuda	3	0	1	2	3	6	−3	1	

Source: CONCACAF
Rules for classification: Group stage tiebreakers
(H) Hosts
19 February 2017
13:00

Bermuda	1–1	Trinidad and Tobago
Lowe 69'	Report	St. Hillaire 23'

Estadio Ricardo Saprissa Aymá, Tibás
Referee: Erick Miranda Galindo (Mexico)
19 February 2017
15:30

Costa Rica	0–1	El Salvador
	Report	Domínguez 65'

Estadio Ricardo Saprissa Aymá, Tibás
Referee: Ismail Eifath (United States)

22 February 2017
16:30

El Salvador	3–1	Bermuda
Domínguez 21'; Castillo 65'; Rivera 67'	Report	Burchall 75'

Estadio Nacional, San José
Referee: Melvin Matamoros (Honduras)
22 February 2017
19:00

Costa Rica	1–0	Trinidad and Tobago
Leal 54'	Report

Estadio Nacional, San José
Referee: Kevin Morrison (Jamaica)

25 February 2017
13:30

El Salvador	1–2	Trinidad and Tobago
Contreras 50'	Report	Mitchell 47'; St. Hillaire 72'

Estadio Nacional, San José
Referee: Erick Miranda Galindo (Mexico)
25 February 2017
16:00

Costa Rica	2–1	Bermuda
Tyrell 43' (o.g.); Leal 50'	Report	Lowe 26'

Estadio Nacional, San José
Referee: Drew Fischer (Canada)

== Classification stage ==
The top two teams from each group in the classification stage qualify for the 2017 FIFA U-20 World Cup, with the group winners also advancing to the final to decide the champions of the CONCACAF U-20 Championship.

=== Group D ===
Pos	Team	Pld	W	D	L	GF	GA	GD	Pts	Qualification
1	United States	2	2	0	0	3	1	+2	6	Final and 2017 FIFA U-20 World Cup
2	Mexico	2	1	0	1	6	2	+4	3	2017 FIFA U-20 World Cup
3	El Salvador	2	0	0	2	2	8	−6	0	

Source: CONCACAF
Rules for classification: Group stage tiebreakers
27 February 2017
16:00

United States	1–0	Mexico
Palmer-Brown 29'	Report

Estadio Ricardo Saprissa Aymá, Tibás
Referee: Melvin Matamoros (Honduras)

1 March 2017
16:30

Mexico	6–1	El Salvador
Antuna 10', 16', 89'; Ayala 17' (o.g.); Aguirre 33'; Cisneros 78' (pen.)	Report	Castillo 65'

Estadio Nacional, San José
Referee: Henry Bejarano (Costa Rica)

3 March 2017
17:30

United States	2–1	El Salvador
Sabbi 18'; Williamson 25'	Report	Márquez 35'

Estadio Nacional, San José
Referee: Jafeth Perea (Panama)

=== Group E ===
Pos	Team	Pld	W	D	L	GF	GA	GD	Pts	Qualification
1	Honduras	2	2	0	0	4	1	+3	6	Final and 2017 FIFA U-20 World Cup
2	Costa Rica (H)	2	0	1	1	2	3	−1	1	2017 FIFA U-20 World Cup
3	Panama	2	0	1	1	1	3	−2	1	

Source: CONCACAF
Rules for classification: Group stage tiebreakers
(H) Hosts
27 February 2017
18:30

Panama	0–2	Honduras
	Report	Vuelto 6'; Álvarez 81'

Estadio Ricardo Saprissa Aymá, Tibás
Referee: Ismail Elfath (United States)

1 March 2017
19:00

Honduras	2–1	Costa Rica
Maldonado 49'; Grant 70'	Report	Reyes 47'

Estadio Nacional, San José
Referee: Erick Miranda Galindo (Mexico)

3 March 2017
20:00

Panama	1–1	Costa Rica
Hinestroza 57'	Report	Leal 9'

Estadio Nacional, San José
Referee: Drew Fischer (Canada)

== Final ==
Since the final ended in a tie at the end of 90 minutes, no extra time was played and the match was decided by a penalty shoot-out.

5 March 2017
15:00

United States	0–0	Honduras
	Report
Penalties
Lennon (penalty scored); Craft (penalty scored); Sabbi (penalty scored); De La Torre (penalty scored); Acosta (penalty scored)	5–3	(penalty scored) Álvarez; (penalty scored) Martínez; (penalty scored) Grant; (penalty missed) Flores

Estadio Nacional, San José
Referee: Henry Bejarano (Costa Rica)

== Awards ==
=== Winners ===
2017 CONCACAF U-20 Championship winners

United States
First title

=== Individual awards ===
The following awards were given at the conclusion of the tournament.

Golden Ball

- (United States) Erik Palmer-Brown

Golden Boot

- (Mexico) Ronaldo Cisneros (6 goals)

Golden Glove

- (United States) Jonathan Klinsmann

Fair Play Award

- Mexico

=== Best XI ===
- Goalkeeper: (United States) Jonathan Klinsmann
- Right Defender: (United States) Marlon Fossey
- Central Defender: (Mexico) Edson Álvarez
- Central Defender: (United States) Justen Glad
- Left Defender: (Panama) Andrés Andrade
- Right Midfielder: (Mexico) Uriel Antuna
- Central Midfielder: (Honduras) Jorge Álvarez
- Central Midfielder: (United States) Erik Palmer-Brown
- Left Midfielder: (United States) Brooks Lennon
- Attacking Midfielder: (Costa Rica) Randall Leal
- Forward: (Mexico) Ronaldo Cisneros

== Goalscorers ==
6 goals

- (Mexico) Ronaldo Cisneros

4 goals

- (Panama) Ricardo Ávila
- (United States) Brooks Lennon

3 goals

- (Costa Rica) Randall Leal
- (Honduras) Jorge Daniel Álvarez
- (Mexico) Uriel Antuna
- (Panama) Leandro Ávila

2 goals

- (Bermuda) Oneko Lowe
- (El Salvador) Fernando Castillo
- (El Salvador) Roberto Domínguez
- (Haiti) Jonel Désiré
- (Honduras) Darixon Vuelto
- (Mexico) Eduardo Aguirre
- (Trinidad and Tobago) Kathon St. Hillaire
- (United States) Sebastian Saucedo

1 goal

- (Antigua and Barbuda) Luther Wildin
- (Bermuda) Mazhye Burchall
- (Canada) Shaan Hundal
- (Canada) Kris Twardek
- (Costa Rica) Andy Reyes
- (El Salvador) Josè Contreras
- (El Salvador) Marvin Márquez
- (El Salvador) Josue Rivera
- (Haiti) Alessandro Campoy
- (Haiti) Brian Chevreuil
- (Haiti) Ronaldo Damus
- (Haiti) Kenley Dede
- (Haiti) Jimmy-Shammar Sanon
- (Honduras) Foslyn Grant
- (Honduras) Denil Maldonado
- (Honduras) Douglas Martínez
- (Mexico) Sebastián Córdova
- (Mexico) Claudio Zamudio
- (Panama) Andrés Andrade
- (Panama) Isidoro Hinestroza
- (Saint Kitts and Nevis) Romario Martin
- (Saint Kitts and Nevis) Javier Sutton
- (Trinidad and Tobago) Jabari Mitchell
- (United States) Luca de la Torre
- (United States) Jonathan Lewis
- (United States) Erik Palmer-Brown
- (United States) Emmanuel Sabbi
- (United States) Eryk Williamson

1 own goal

- (Antigua and Barbuda) Vashami Allen (playing against Mexico)
- (Antigua and Barbuda) Jarmarlie Stevens (playing against Honduras)
- (Bermuda) Tehvan Tyrell (playing against Costa Rica)
- (El Salvador) Walter Ayala (playing against Mexico)

Source: CONCACAF.com

== Qualification for international tournaments ==
=== Qualified teams for FIFA U-20 World Cup ===
The following four teams from CONCACAF qualified for the 2017 FIFA U-20 World Cup.

Team	Qualified on	Previous appearances in tournament^{1}
United States	3 March 2017	14 (1981, 1983, 1987, 1989, 1993, 1997, 1999, 2001, 2003, 2005, 2007, 2009, 2013, 2015)
Honduras	1 March 2017	6 (1977, 1995, 1999, 2005, 2009, 2015)
Mexico	1 March 2017	14 (1977, 1979, 1981, 1983, 1985, 1991, 1993, 1997, 1999, 2003, 2007, 2011, 2013, 2015)
Costa Rica	3 March 2017	8 (1989, 1995, 1997, 1999, 2001, 2007, 2009, 2011)

^{1} Bold indicates champion for that year. Italic indicates host for that year.

=== Qualified teams for Central American and Caribbean Games ===
The competition was used to decide the two teams from the Caribbean Football Union which would qualify for the 2018 Central American and Caribbean Games. As none of the five Caribbean teams reached the classification stage, all teams were ranked by their group stage performance.

Pos	Team	Pld	W	D	L	GF	GA	GD	Pts	Qualification
1	Trinidad and Tobago	3	1	1	1	3	3	0	**4**	2018 Central American and Caribbean Games
2	Haiti	3	1	0	2	7	8	−1	**3**	2018 Central American and Caribbean Games
3	Bermuda	3	0	1	2	3	6	−3	**1**	
4	Antigua and Barbuda	3	0	0	3	1	9	−8	**0**	
5	Saint Kitts and Nevis	3	0	0	3	2	13	−11	**0**	

Source: CONCACAF
