= Tyrique =

Tyrique is a masculine given name. Notable people with the name include:

- Tyrique Bartlett (born 1999), South African footballer
- Tyrique Jarrett (born 1994), American football nose tackle
- Tyrique Jones (born 1997), American basketball player
- Tyrique Lake (born 1999), Anguillan footballer
- Tyrique Mercera (born 2003), Curaçaoan footballer
- Tyrique Stevenson (born 2000), American football player
