= Fernando Augusto =

Fernando Augusto may refer to:

- Fernando Augusto Azevedo Pedreira (born 1986), Brazilian professional footballer
- Fernando Augusto da Silva (born 1979), Brazilian jiu-jitsu competitor, mixed martial arts fighter, and submission grappler
- Fernando Augusto de Castro Ribeiro (born 1997), Brazilian professional footballer
- Fernando Augusto (footballer) (Fernando Augusto Rodrigues de Araujo; born 1993), Brazilian professional footballer
