= Wilfrid Montilas =

Haitian footballer and manager (born 1971)

Personal information
- Date of birth: 25 August 1971 (age 55)

Senior career*
Years	Team	Apps	(Gls)
- Don Bosco

International career
1996–2002	Haiti	17	(0)

Managerial career
- 2016–: Haiti U-20
- * Club domestic league appearances and goals

Wilfrid Montilas is a current football manager and former Haitian international footballer.

In October 2016, he won the 2017 Under 20 Caribbean Cup with Haiti U-20, qualifying for the 2017 CONCACAF U-20 Championship.
