= Klinsmann (surname) =

Klinsmann is a German surname. Notable people with the surname include:

- Jonathan Klinsmann (born 1997), American soccer player
- Jürgen Klinsmann (born 1964), German football manager and player
