= 1986 CONCACAF U-20 Tournament =

Tournament details
- Host country: Trinidad and Tobago
- Dates: 16–31 August
- Teams: 10

Final positions
- Champions: Canada (1st title)
- Runners-up: United States
- Third place: Trinidad and Tobago
- Fourth place: Cuba

The 1986 CONCACAF Under-20 Championship was held in Trinidad and Tobago. It also served as qualification for the 1987 FIFA World Youth Championship.

== Qualifying ==
- Jamaica 2-0 Cuba [on 12 July 1986 at Kingston]
- Cuba 2-0 Jamaica [on 20 July 1986 at Camagüey]
- Suriname 2-0 Netherlands Antilles [on 2 July 1986 at Paramaribo?]
- Suriname 1-0 Netherlands Antilles [on 4 July 1986 at Paramaribo?]
- Barbados 3-1 Grenada [on 15 June 1986 at Bridgetown]
- Grenada 0-1 Barbados [on 22 June 1986 at St. George's]

Other qualification matches may have been played.

== Teams ==
The following teams entered the tournament:

Region	Team(s)
Caribbean (CFU)	Antigua and Barbuda; Barbados; Bermuda; Cuba; Jamaica; Suriname; Trinidad and Tobago (host)
Central America (UNCAF)	None
North America (NAFU)	Canada; Mexico; United States

== Round 1 ==
=== Group A ===
Teams	Pld	W	D	L	GF	GA	GD	Pts
Canada	4	4	0	0	15	0	+15	8
Trinidad and Tobago	4	3	0	1	8	6	+2	6
Bermuda	4	1	1	2	8	12	–4	3
Antigua and Barbuda	4	0	2	2	5	12	–7	2
Barbados	4	0	1	3	4	10	–6	1

16 August	Canada	3–0	Bermuda
	Trinidad and Tobago	3–0	Barbados
18 August	Barbados	1–1	Antigua and Barbuda
	Bermuda	1–3	Trinidad and Tobago
20 August	Antigua and Barbuda	3–3	Bermuda
	Trinidad and Tobago	0–4	Canada
22 August	Bermuda	4–3	Barbados
	Canada	6–0	Antigua and Barbuda
24 August	Barbados	0–2	Canada
	Trinidad and Tobago	2–1	Antigua and Barbuda

=== Group B ===
Teams	Pld	W	D	L	GF	GA	GD	Pts
United States	4	2	1	1	8	1	+7	5
Cuba	4	2	1	1	5	2	+3	5
Mexico	4	2	1	1	4	4	0	5
Suriname	4	2	0	2	6	6	0	4
Jamaica	4	0	1	3	1	11	–10	1

17 August	Cuba	2–1	Suriname
	Mexico	0–3	United States
19 August	Jamaica	0–0	Mexico
	United States	0–0	Cuba
21 August	Jamaica	0–5	United States
	Suriname	1–3	Mexico
23 August	Jamaica	1–3	Suriname
	Cuba	0–1	Mexico
25 August	United States	0–1	Suriname
	Jamaica	0–3	Cuba

== Final round ==
Teams	Pld	W	D	L	GF	GA	GD	Pts
Canada	3	2	1	0	8	2	+6	5
United States	3	1	1	1	2	2	0	3
Trinidad and Tobago	3	1	1	1	1	5	–4	3
Cuba	3	0	1	2	1	3	–2	1

27 August	United States	1–1	Canada
	Trinidad and Tobago	0–0	Cuba
29 August	United States	1–0	Cuba
	Trinidad and Tobago	0–5	Canada
31 August	Canada	2–1	Cuba
	Trinidad and Tobago	1–0	United States

1986 CONCACAF U-20 Championship

Canada
First title

== Qualification to World Youth Championship ==
The two best performing teams qualified for the 1987 FIFA World Youth Championship.

- Canada
- United States
