= Salas Cannonier =

Kittian footballer

Personal information
- Full name: Salas Kolen Rai Cannonier
- Date of birth: 29 November 1997 (age 28)
- Position: Defender

Team information
- Current team: St. Peters Strikers

Senior career*
Years	Team	Apps	(Gls)
2015–2018	St. Peters Strikers		
2018–2019	W Connection		
2019–2020	St. Peters Strikers		
2020–2021	Arnett Gardens	2	(0)
2021–	St. Peters Strikers		

International career^{‡}
2016–	Saint Kitts and Nevis	1	(0)
- * Club domestic league appearances and goals ‡ National team caps and goals as of 18:39, 20 December 2021 (UTC)

Salas Cannonier (born 29 November 1997) is a Saint Kitts and Nevis association footballer who currently plays for St. Peters Strikers, and the Saint Kitts and Nevis national team.

== Club career ==
Salas came up through the ranks of St. Peters Strikers FC of the SKNFA Premier League. He was playing with the senior team in the top flight by 2015. He joined W Connection F.C. of the TT Pro League ahead of the 2018 season. In February 2020 it was announced that he had signed for Arnett Gardens F.C. of the Jamaica National Premier League for the remainder of the season along with compatriot Geovannie Lake. The two players were spotted by Arnett Gardens in a surprise Saint Kitts and Nevis draw with Jamaica which knocked the latter out of 2020 CONCACAF Men's Olympic Qualifying Championship qualification. By May 2021 he had returned to St. Peters Strikers.

== International career ==
Cannonier made his senior international debut on 31 August 2016 in a friendly match against Nicaragua. He was included in Saint Kitts and Nevis squad for the 2017 CONCACAF U-20 Championship. He went on to appear in all three of the team's matches. He captained the team in the tournament. In September 2019 he was again named to the senior squad, this time for 2019–20 CONCACAF Nations League B matches against Grenada and French Guiana.

=== International career statistics ===
As of match played 31 August 2016.

Saint Kitts and Nevis
Year	Apps	Goals
2016	1	0
Total	1	0
