= Jeremy Cijntje =

Curaçaoan footballer

Personal information
- Date of birth: 8 January 1998 (age 28)
- Place of birth: Dordrecht, Netherlands
- Height: 1.83 m (6 ft 0 in)
- Position: Winger

Senior career*
Years	Team	Apps	(Gls)
2016–2019	Dordrecht	41	(9)
2019–2022	Heracles	16	(0)
2021	→ Waasland-Beveren (loan)	4	(0)
2021–2022	→ Roda JC (loan)	10	(0)
2022	→ Den Bosch (loan)	16	(1)
2022–2023	Jerv	19	(0)

International career
- Curaçao U20
- * Club domestic league appearances and goals as of 1 January 2024

Jeremy Cijntje (born 8 January 1998) is a retired footballer who played as a winger. Born in the Netherlands, he represented Curaçao at under-20 youth level.

== Club career ==
In January 2021, he moved on loan to Waasland-Beveren.

On 31 August 2021, he moved on loan to Roda JC Kerkrade.

On 15 January 2022, Cijntje moved on loan to FC Den Bosch. In September 2022, he moved to Norwegian club Jerv. He retired in 2024 due to injury and started his own football school.

== International career ==
He represented the Curaçao national under-20 team in 2017 CONCACAF U-20 Championship qualifying, scoring against Saint Kitts and Nevis.
