= Vashami Allen =

Antiguan footballer

Personal information
- Date of birth: April 9, 1997 (age 29)
- Place of birth: All Saints, Antigua and Barbuda
- Height: 1.83 m (6 ft 0 in)
- Position: Defender

Senior career*
| Years | Team | Apps | (Gls) |
| –2015 | All Saints United F.C. | | |
| 2015–2016 | Fort Road FC | | |
| 2016–2017 | All Saints United F.C. | | |
| 2017 | Central FC | | |

International career
- Antigua and Barbuda U20
| 2015–2016 | Antigua and Barbuda | 2 | (0) |
- * Club domestic league appearances and goals

Vashami Allen (born 9 May 1997 in All Saints, Antigua and Barbuda) is an Antiguan footballer who last operated as defender for Central FC in the TT Pro League. His football ambition is to play in Europe.

== Early life ==
First getting involved in football at his primary school, the Antiguan was identified as a possible talent by coaches there, starting his football career. Growing up, Allen saw Antiguan footballer Dave Carr play frequently for the national team.

== Career ==
=== Central FC ===
One of 12 players sent to Central FC on three-week contracts to help the club in its audacious attempt to win three CFU Club Championships in succession, Allen refused to renew his contract with the club after claiming to have been living in poor conditions and not getting a monthly wage.

=== International ===
Named on the Antigua and Barbuda Under-20 roster in 2016, the defender helped the team finish second behind Haiti to qualify for the 2017 CONCACAF U-20 Championship, getting a spot in the Caribbean qualifying Best Eleven. Making his second senior national team cap against Estonia, Allen nervousness ahead of the game was alleviated by encouragement from the senior players and put up a solid performance.
