= Zayn Hakeem =

Antiguan footballer (born 1999)

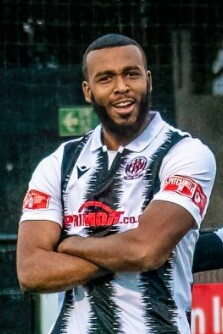
- Hakeem in 2023

Personal information
- Full name: Zayn Mohammed Junayd Hakeem
- Date of birth: 15 February 1999 (age 27)
- Place of birth: Leicester, England
- Height: 1.88 m (6 ft 2 in)
- Position: Forward

Team information
- Current team: Barwell FC

Youth career
- 2012–2014: Nottingham Forest
- 2014–2016: Mansfield Town

Senior career*
Years	Team	Apps	(Gls)
2016–2019	Mansfield Town	2	(0)
2017	→ Matlock Town (loan)	5	(0)
2018	→ Grantham Town (loan)	13	(2)
2018	→ Basford United (loan)	3	(0)
2018–2019	→ Coalville Town (loan)	2	(0)
2019	Bradford (Park Avenue)	5	(0)
2019–2020	Barwell	14	(2)
2020	Coleshill Town	6	(1)
2020–2021	Anstey Nomads	14	(8)
2021	Worksop Town	8	(2)
2021–2022	Stamford	12	(1)
2022	Anstey Nomads		
2022–2023	Shepshed Dynamo	38	(17)
2023	Basford United	4	(0)
2023	→ Long Eaton United (loan)	6	(0)
2023–2024	Shepshed Dynamo	12	(3)
2024–2025	Anstey Nomads	55	(18)
2025–	Barwell	12	(7)

International career^{‡}
2017–2018	Antigua and Barbuda U20	7	(4)
2023	Antigua and Barbuda	2	(0)
- * Club domestic league appearances and goals as of 16:40, 21 December 2023 (UTC) ‡ National team caps and goals as of 03:04, 6 September 2023 (UTC)

Zayn Mohammed Junayd Hakeem (born 15 February 1999) is a footballer who plays for Barwell, where he plays as a forward. Born in England, he played for the Antigua and Barbuda national team.

== Early life ==
Hakeem attended The Martin High School, Anstey, Leicestershire starting in 2012.

== Playing career ==
=== Mansfield Town ===
Hakeem began his career with Mansfield Town and made his professional debut on 7 May 2016 in a 0–0 draw against Cambridge United.

In August 2017, Hakeem joined Matlock Town on loan for one month.

In September 2018, Hakeem joined Basford United on a one-month loan deal. He scored on his debut for the club in the FA Cup against Staveley Miners Welfare.

He joined Southern League Premier Central side Coalville Town on loan on 13 October 2018, on a deal that ran until 1 January 2019.

He was released by Mansfield at the end of the 2018–19 season.

=== Bradford (Park Avenue) ===
Zayn signed for National League North side Bradford (Park Avenue) on 30 July 2019.

=== Barwell ===
Hakeem joined Southern League Premier Division Central side Barwell for the 2019–20 season in September 2019. He made his Southern League Premier Division Central debut on 28 September 2019 coming on as a 70th-minute substitute for Tolani Omotola, in a 3–1 away defeat at Nuneaton Borough.

Zayn scored his first Southern League Premier Division Central goal for Barwell on 21 December 2019, in an away fixture against Peterborough Sports, again coming on as a 70th-minute substitute for Tolani Omotola, Hakeem scored the equaliser on the 73rd minute to make it 4–4, only for Dan Lawlor to score an 80th-minute winner for Peterborough Sports.

=== Coleshill Town ===
Zayn signed for Southern League Division One Central side Coleshill Town on 23 January 2020. He made his Southern League Division One Central debut the following day in a home fixture against Aylesbury United, it wasn't one to remember with his new team succumbing to a 6–0 home defeat.

=== Northern Premier League ===
In July 2021, he signed for Northern Premier League Division One East side Worksop Town, following a curtailed season at Anstey Nomads in the previous campaign in the United Counties League. In October 2021, he was on the move again to divisional rivals Stamford. He returned to Anstey Nomads in January 2022, as he had found his game time limited at Stamford. Hakeem made the move back to the NPL, signing for Shepshed Dynamo at the beginning of the 2022–23 season.

In May 2023, Hakeem signed for Basford United. He joined Long Eaton United on an initial three-month loan deal in August 2023. He returned to Shepshed Dynamo on a permanent basis in December 2023.

== International career ==
Hakeem has represented Antigua and Barbuda U-20s. He scored twice against Bermuda in the 2017 CONCACAF U-20 Championship qualifying tournament. He has also represented the Antigua and Barbuda nation men's team making 3 appearances. The 3 performances were against Guadeloupe, Puerto Rico and Montserrat.

== Career statistics ==
=== Club ===
As of end of 2022–23 season

Appearances and goals by club, season and competition
Club	Season	League			FA Cup		League Cup		Other		Total	
Club	Season	Division	Apps	Goals	Apps	Goals	Apps	Goals	Apps	Goals	Apps	Goals
Mansfield Town	2015–16	League Two	1	0	0	0	0	0	0	0	1	0
Mansfield Town	2016–17	League Two	0	0	0	0	1	0	0	0	0	0
Mansfield Town	2017–18	League Two	0	0	0	0	0	0	1 (Note: One appearance in EFL Trophy)	0	0	0
Mansfield Town	2018–19	League Two	1	0	0	0	0	0	0	0	1	0
Mansfield Town	Total		2	0	0	0	1	0	1	0	4	0
Matlock Town (loan)	2017–18	Northern Premier League Premier Division	5	0	0	0	—		0	0	5	0
Grantham Town (loan)	2017–18	Northern Premier League Premier Division	13	2	0	0	—		2 (Note: Appearance(s) in Northern Premier League Premier Division play-offs)	0	15	2
Basford United (loan)	2018–19	Northern Premier League Premier Division	3	0	1	1	—		1 (Note: Appearance(s) in Northern Premier League Challenge Cup)	0	5	1
Coalville Town (loan)	2018–19	Southern League Premier Division Central	2	0	0	0	—		0	0	2	0
Bradford (Park Avenue)	2019–20	National League North	5	0	0	0	—		0	0	5	0
Barwell	2019–20	Southern League Premier Division Central	14	2	0	0	—		2 (Note: One appearance in FA Trophy; one appearance in Leicestershire and Rutland Challenge Cup)	0	16	2
Coleshill Town	2019–20	Southern League Division One Central	6	1	0	0	—		0	0	6	1
Shepshed Dynamo	2022–23	Northern Premier League Midlands Division	38	17	5	2	—		2 (Note: Appearance(s) in FA Trophy)	0	45	19
Career total			88	22	6	3	1	0	8	0	103	25
