= Tyrique Lake =

Anguillan footballer (born 1999)

Personal information
- Date of birth: 4 January 1999 (age 27)
- Place of birth: Saint Thomas, U.S. Virgin Islands
- Position: Midfielder

Team information
- Current team: Longwood Lancers

College career
Years	Team	Apps	(Gls)
2017–2019	Crowder Roughriders	28	(0)
2019–	Longwood Lancers	9	(0)

International career^{‡}
- Anguilla U20
2018–	Anguilla	10	(0)
- ‡ National team caps and goals as of 12 June 2022

Tyrique Lake (born 4 January 1999) is an Anguillan footballer who plays college soccer for Longwood University as a midfielder.

== Early and personal life ==
Lake was born in Saint Thomas, U.S. Virgin Islands.

== Career ==
Lake attended Fayetteville High School, where he was named to the All State, All Conference and All Star Soccer teams. He then attended Crowder College. After spending his freshman and sophomore years there, Lake transferred to Longwood University.

At the youth level, he played in the 2017 CONCACAF U-20 Championship qualifiers, scoring against the Cayman Islands. Lake made his senior international debut on 18 November 2018 in a 1–1 away draw with the Bahamas during CONCACAF Nations League qualifying.

== Career statistics ==
=== International ===
As of match played 12 June 2022

National team	Year	Apps	Goals
Anguilla	2018	1	0
Anguilla	2019	2	0
Anguilla	2021	4	0
Anguilla	2022	3	0
Total		10	0
