= Manny Rodríguez (footballer) =

Dominican footballer

Personal information
- Full name: Manny Alexander Rodríguez Baldera
- Date of birth: 23 May 1998 (age 28)
- Place of birth: Santiago de los Caballeros, Dominican Republic
- Height: 1.81 m (5 ft 11 in)
- Position: Defender

Team information
- Current team: Heracles Almelo
- Number: 25

Youth career
- 2013–2014: AV La Chimenea
- 2014–2015: Moratalaz
- 2015–2017: Atlético Madrid

Senior career*
Years	Team	Apps	(Gls)
2017–2019	Atlético Madrid B	45	(4)
2019–2020	Celta de Vigo B	5	(0)
2020–2021	Hércules	3	(0)
2021–2022	Rayo Majadahonda	39	(1)
2022–2024	SD Logroñés	51	(0)
2024–2025	San Fernando	24	(1)
2025–2026	Linares Deportivo	27	(4)
2026–	Heracles	12	(3)

International career^{‡}
2016	Dominican Republic U20	3	(2)
2021–	Dominican Republic	8	(1)
- * Club domestic league appearances and goals as of 4 November 2026 ‡ National team caps and goals as of 1 August 2026

Manny Alexander Rodríguez Baldera (born 23 May 1998) is a Dominican footballer who plays as a defender for Dutch Eerste Divisie club Heracles Almelo and the Dominican Republic national team.

== Early life ==
Born in Santiago de los Caballeros, Rodríguez moved with his family to Spain when he was 8. There, his family has settled in Madrid, near Vicente Calderón Stadium.

== Club career ==
Rodríguez began his football career at 15. He started playing for the youth teams of AV La Chimenea and ED Moratalaz, before joining Atlético Madrid youth ranks in 2015.

On 16 June 2026, Rodríguez signed a two-season contract with Heracles Almelo in the Dutch second tier.

== International career ==
Rodríguez first represented the Dominican Republic at under-20 level. He made his senior international debut in 2021.
