= Jahkari Furbert =

Bermudan footballer

Personal information
- Date of birth: 6 March 1999 (age 27)
- Place of birth: Hamilton, Bermuda
- Position: Midfielder

Team information
- Current team: Wakefield

Senior career*
Years	Team	Apps	(Gls)
2015–2019	BAA Wanderers		
2019–	Wakefield		

International career^{‡}
- Bermuda U17
2018	Bermuda U20	4	(0)
2019–	Bermuda	2	(0)
- * Club domestic league appearances and goals as of 15:44, 16 June 2019 (UTC) ‡ National team caps and goals as of 15:44, 16 June 2019 (UTC)

Jahkari Furbert (born 6 March 1999) is a Bermudan footballer who currently plays as a midfielder for Wakefield.

== Career statistics ==
=== International ===
As of matches played 16 June 2019.

National team	Year	Apps	Goals
Bermuda	2019	2	0
Total		2	0
