= Ronaldo Cisneros =

Mexican footballer (born 1997)

Personal information
- Full name: Ronaldo Cisneros Morell
- Date of birth: 8 January 1997 (age 29)
- Place of birth: Torreón, Coahuila, Mexico
- Height: 1.80 m (5 ft 11 in)
- Position: Forward

Team information
- Current team: Alajuelense

Youth career
- 2011–2014: Santos Laguna

Senior career*
Years	Team	Apps	(Gls)
2014–2017	Santos Laguna	9	(0)
2018–2024	Guadalajara	70	(9)
2018	→ Zacatepec (loan)	13	(1)
2019	→ Zacatecas (loan)	13	(1)
2020–2021	→ Tapatío (loan)	29	(7)
2022	→ Atlanta United (loan)	28	(7)
2024–2025	Querétaro	21	(2)
2025–	LD Alajuelense	25	(12)

International career
2015	Mexico U18	3	(1)
2017	Mexico U20	10	(8)
2018	Mexico U21	2	(0)
2019	Mexico U23	2	(0)
Medal record
Men's football
Representing Mexico
Toulon Tournament
Third place	2019 France	Team
- * Club domestic league appearances and goals as of 21 December 2025

Ronaldo Cisneros Morell (born 8 January 1997) is a Mexican professional footballer who plays as a forward for Liga FPD club Alajuelense.

== Early life ==
Ronaldo Cisneros Morell was born in Torreón, Coahuila, to Mario Cisneros. Mario named him Ronaldo because of the Brazilian football icon during the time, Ronaldo. Showing talent at a young age he caught the attention of a Santos Laguna youth recruiter.

== Club career ==
=== Youth ===
Cisneros joined Santos youth academy in 2011. He continued through all the ranks from Santos Youth Academy successfully going through U-15, U-17, and U-20. He managed to become top scorer for the U-17 and U-20s squads. Portuguese coach Pedro Caixinha promoted Ronaldo to the first the team.

=== Santos Laguna ===
Cisneros made his professional debut in the Liga MX on October 24, 2014, in a 1–1 draw against Pumas UNAM. He scored a hat trick against Juárez in the Copa MX on September 13, 2017. After Santos began to struggle, Cisneros was not being considered in the first team as he was too young to take on big responsibilities and only played in the Copa MX and under-20s squad. His number was first 132, but a while after, it was changed to 97.

=== Guadalajara ===
On December 13, 2017, Cisneros was signed by Guadalajara. He scored his first Liga MX goal on his debut for the club on January 20, 2018, against Club Necaxa.

== International career ==
=== Youth ===
Cisneros was called up to the under-20 squad which participated in the 2017 CONCACAF U-20 Championship. He went on to score 6 goals in only 5 appearances becoming one of the top scorers in the tournament. Cisneros was also called up to the 2017 FIFA U-20 World Cup and scored 2 goals in 5 appearances scoring against Vanuatu and Senegal.

In May 2019, Cisneros was called up by Jaime Lozano to participate in that year's Toulon Tournament, where Mexico finished third in the tournament.

== Honours ==
Guadalajara

- CONCACAF Champions League: 2018

Alajuelense

- CONCACAF Central American Cup: 2025
- Liga Promérica: 2025 Apertura

Individual

- CONCACAF Under-20 Championship Golden Boot: 2017
- CONCACAF U-20 Championship Best XI: 2017
