= Isaac Rouaud =

Haitian footballer (born 1998)

Personal information
- Full name: Isaac Thomas Joseph Rouaud-Simon
- Date of birth: 12 February 1998 (age 28)
- Place of birth: Port-au-Prince, Haiti
- Height: 1.83 m (6 ft 0 in)
- Position: Goalkeeper

Team information
- Current team: Amilly

Senior career*
Years	Team	Apps	(Gls)
2016–2017	Le Mans II	0	(0)
2017–2018	Saint-Malo	0	(0)
2018–2019	Vannes	0	(0)
2019–2020	Givry	4	(0)
2020–	Amilly	0	(0)

International career^{‡}
2017	Haiti U20	3	(0)
2019–	Haiti	1	(0)
- * Club domestic league appearances and goals as of 05:27, 18 April 2022 (UTC) ‡ National team caps and goals as of 05:27, 18 April 2022 (UTC)

Isaac Thomas Joseph Rouaud-Simon (born 12 February 1998) is a Haitian professional footballer who plays as a goalkeeper for Championnat National 3 club Amilly and the Haiti national team.

== Club career ==
Born in Haiti, Rouaud-Simon moved to France after being adopted at a young age and began his career with the reserves of Le Mans, before stints with Saint-Malo, and Vannes. He moved to Belgium with Givry for the 2019–20 season. On 1 October 2020, he returned to France with J3S Amilly.

== International career ==
Rouaud debuted with the Haiti national team in a 3–1 friendly win over Guyana on 11 June 2019. He was called up to represent Haiti at the 2021 CONCACAF Gold Cup.
