= Javorn Stevens =

Antigua and Barbudan footballer

Personal information
- Full name: Javorn Stevens
- Date of birth: 9 May 1998 (age 28)
- Place of birth: Greenbay, Antigua and Barbuda
- Height: 1.83 m (6 ft 0 in)
- Position: Forward

Team information
- Current team: Greenbay Hoppers
- Number: 30

Senior career*
Years	Team	Apps	(Gls)
2016	Greenbay Hoppers	?	(?)
2017	Seattle Sounders FC 2	10	(0)
2018–	Greenbay Hoppers	?	(?)

International career^{‡}
2012–2014	Antigua and Barbuda U17		
2014–2016	Antigua and Barbuda U20		
2015–	Antigua and Barbuda	31	(4)
- * Club domestic league appearances and goals ‡ National team caps and goals as of 7 September 2024

Javorn Stevens (born 9 May 1998) is an Antiguan footballer who plays as a forward for Greenbay Hoppers.

== International career ==
=== International goals ===
Scores and results list Antigua and Barbuda's goal tally first.

Goal	Date	Venue	Opponent	Score	Result	Competition
1.	8 March 2015	Antigua Recreation Ground, St. John's, Antigua and Barbuda	U.S. Virgin Islands	2–0	2–0	Friendly
2.	14 October 2023	Thomas Robinson Stadium, Nassau, Bahamas	Bahamas	1–0	4–1	2023–24 CONCACAF Nations League B
3.	14 October 2023	Thomas Robinson Stadium, Nassau, Bahamas	Bahamas	2–0	4–1	2023–24 CONCACAF Nations League B
4.	7 September 2024	ABFA Technical Center, Piggotts, Antigua and Barbuda	Dominica	1–1	2–1	2024–25 CONCACAF Nations League B
