= Roberto Louima =

Haitian footballer (born 1997)

Personal information
- Full name: Roberto Badio Louima
- Date of birth: 4 March 1997 (age 29)
- Place of birth: Port-au-Prince, Haiti
- Height: 1.72 m (5 ft 8 in)
- Position: Forward

Team information
- Current team: Naples United
- Number: 16

Youth career
- 2004–2015: Lionceaux FC

Senior career*
Years	Team	Apps	(Gls)
2015–2016	Violette		
2016–2017	Real Hope		
2018–	Violette		
2023	→ Atlético Vega Real (loan)	13	(5)
2024	Moca		
2025–	Naples United		

International career^{‡}
2017	Haiti U20	2	(0)
2014–2018	Haiti U21	7	(0)
2021	Haiti U23	3	(1)
2016–	Haiti	5	(0)
- * Club domestic league appearances and goals as of 20 March 2025 ‡ National team caps and goals as of 20 March 2025

Roberto Badio Louima (born 4 March 1997) is a Haitian professional footballer who plays as a forward for National Premier Soccer League club Naples United FC and the Haiti national team.

== Early life ==
Louima was born in Haiti and named after the Italian footballer Roberto Baggio. He has a younger brother and sister who both play football. Louima is a youth product of the Lionceaux FC having joined at the age of 7, before joining Violette in 2016.

== Career ==
Louima began his career with Violette for a year, before transferring to Real Hope in 2016 where he helped them win Ligue Haïtienne. He returned to Violette in 2017, helping them get promoted from the first division back to the Ligue Haïtienne.

Im 2025, Louima joined American National Premier Soccer League club Naples United FC, debuting as a halftime substitute in the team's U.S. Open Cup match.

== International career ==
Louima debuted with the Haiti national team in a 1–0 2018 FIFA World Cup qualification loss to Costa Rica on 2 September 2016.
