= Fitz Jolly =

Dominica footballer

Personal information
- Date of birth: 16 March 1999 (age 27)
- Place of birth: Les Abymes, Guadeloupe
- Height: 1.80 m (5 ft 11 in)
- Position: Attacking midfielder

Team information
- Current team: Bath Estate

College career
Years	Team	Apps	(Gls)
2018–2019	Lackawanna Falcons	24	(7)
2019–2020	IUE Red Wolves	17	(1)

Senior career*
Years	Team	Apps	(Gls)
2016–2017	Bath Estate		
2017–2018	Harlem United		
2018–2019	Bath Estate		
2020	Cincinnati Dutch Lions	0	(0)
2021–	Bath Estate		

International career^{‡}
2021–	Dominica	14	(0)
- * Club domestic league appearances and goals ‡ National team caps and goals as of 19:58, 16 June 2026 (UTC)

Fitz Jolly (born 16 March 1999) is a Dominican footballer who currently plays for Bath Estate FC of the Dominica Premier League, and the Dominica national team.

== College career ==
Jolly began playing college soccer in the United States with the Lackawanna Falcons in 2018. In his two seasons with the team, he scored seven goals in twenty four games played. Following his second season with the team, he was named the Eastern Pennsylvania Athletic Conference Division I Player of the Year. After two seasons at Lackawanna he transferred to Indiana University East to play for the Red Wolves.

== Club career ==
Jolly began playing for Bath Estate FC of the Dominica Premier League in 2016. He transferred to Harlem United FC from 2017 to 2018 before returning to Bath Estate in 2018.

In 2020 Jolly joined the Cincinnati Dutch Lions of the USL League Two. However the season was cancelled because of the COVID-19 pandemic.

== International career ==
Jolly played every minute of every match for Dominica during the 2018 CONCACAF U-20 Championship. In May 2019 he was named to Dominica's roster for 2020 CONCACAF Men's Olympic Qualifying Championship qualification. He made his senior international debut on 24 March 2021 in a 2022 FIFA World Cup qualification match against the Dominican Republic.

=== International career statistics ===
As of match played 2 June 2021.

Dominica
Year	Apps	Goals
2021	3	0
Total	3	0
