= Brian Chevreuil =

French-born Haitian footballer (born 1997)

Personal information
- Date of birth: 26 February 1997 (age 29)
- Place of birth: Paris, France
- Height: 1.76 m (5 ft 9 in)
- Position: Midfielder

Team information
- Current team: Bourges Moulon

Senior career*
Years	Team	Apps	(Gls)
2015–2017	Châteauroux B	44	(1)
2017–2020	Châteauroux	6	(1)
2018	→ Romorantin (loan)	10	(0)
2020–2021	Bourges 18	2	(0)
2021–2022	Bourges	20	(2)
2022	Bourges B	1	(0)
2022–2023	Borgo	13	(0)
2023–2024	Olympique Alès	5	(0)
2024	Haguenau	3	(0)
2024–	Bourges Moulon	6	(0)

International career^{‡}
2017	Haiti U20	3	(1)
2018–	Haiti	5	(1)
- * Club domestic league appearances and goals as of 8 December 2024 ‡ National team caps and goals as of 21:57, 13 July 2023 (UTC)

Brian Chevreuil (born 26 February 1997) is a professional footballer who plays as a midfielder for Championnat National 3 club Bourges Moulon. Born in France, he plays for the Haiti national team.

== Club career ==
Chevreuil signed his first professional contract on 27 June 2017 with Châteauroux. He made his professional debut for the club in a 1–0 Ligue 2 loss to Valenciennes on 4 August 2017.

== International career ==
Born in France to a Haitian father and a Réunionais mother, Chevreuil holds French and Haitian nationalities. He represents Haiti internationally. He represented the Haiti U20s at the 2017 CONCACAF U-20 Championship. Chevreuil made three appearances in total, scoring in his debut against Saint Kitts and Nevis U20.

Chevreuil made a FIFA-unrecognised debut for the senior Haiti national team in a 1–0 friendly win over UAE on 10 November 2017. His first FIFA-recognised match for Haiti was on 29 May 2018 in a 4–0 friendly loss to Argentina. He scored his first international goal in his third appearance for the national team as Haiti beat Jordan 2–0 in a friendly in Riffa.

=== International goals ===
No.	Date	Venue	Opponent	Score	Result	Competition
1.	4 September 2021	Bahrain National Stadium, Riffa, Bahrain	Jordan	2–0	2–0	Friendly
