= Kierron Mason =

Trinidad and Tobago footballer

Personal information
- Date of birth: 14 August 1998 (age 28)
- Place of birth: Marabella, Trinidad and Tobago
- Height: 6 ft 2 in (1.88 m)
- Position: Defensive midfielder

Senior career*
| Years | Team | Apps | (Gls) |
| 2018–2019 | W Connection | ? | (1) |
| 2019–2021 | Charleston Battery | 6 | (0) |

International career^{‡}
| 2017 | Trinidad and Tobago U20 | 3 | (0) |
| 2018 | Trinidad and Tobago U21 | 3 | (0) |
- * Club domestic league appearances and goals as of 5 October 2020 ‡ National team caps and goals as of 20 May 2019

Kierron Mason (born 14 August 1998) is a Trinidadian international footballer.

== Career ==
From 2018 to 2019, Mason played for W Connection F.C. of the TT Pro League.

On 8 March 2019, Charleston Battery of the USL Championship announced they had signed Mason for the 2019 season.
