= Knory Scott =

Bermudian footballer

Personal information
- Full name: Knory Scott
- Date of birth: 6 June 1999 (age 27)
- Place of birth: Hamilton, Bermuda
- Positions: Attacking midfielder; forward

Team information
- Current team: Lancing

Youth career
- North Village Rams

Senior career*
Years	Team	Apps	(Gls)
2018–2020	Kidderminster Harriers	3	(0)
2020	→ Alvechurch (loan)	0	(0)
2020–2023	Hastings United	61	(4)
2023–2024	Lancing	27	(3)
2024	Eastbourne Town	1	(0)
2024–	Lancing	9	

International career^{‡}
2017–2019	Bermuda U20	7	(4)
2019–	Bermuda	17	(2)
- * Club domestic league appearances and goals as of 21:50, 31 October 2024 (UTC) ‡ National team caps and goals as of 21:45, 31 October 2024 (UTC)

Knory Scott (born 6 June 1999) is a Bermudian footballer who plays as a midfielder for Lancing and the Bermuda national team.

== Club career ==
Scott played for North Village Rams in Bermuda.

=== Kidderminster Harriers ===
Scott joined Harriers' U23s programme ahead of the 18/19 season. He particularly impressed the first team management during 19/20's pre-season campaign, scoring in a friendly against Aston Villa at Aggborough, and earning three first team appearances in the National League North in the early weeks of the season, following his competitive debut against AFC Telford United. In January 2020 he went on loan to Alvechurch in the Southern League to earn match experience.

=== Hastings United ===
Scott transferred to Hastings United in the Isthmian League in 2020 making 70 appearances in four seasons, and was part of their promotion from the South East Division into the Premier. Transferring to Lancing in October 2023.

=== Lancing ===
Scott made 27 league appearances for Lancing. On the 18th of November 2023 Knory Scott became the first player in Lancing's history to play in a full international whilst at the club.

=== Eastbourne Town ===
In July 2024, Scott transferred to Eastbourne Town who were newly promoted into the Isthmian League. Although playing just three games, Knory returned to Lancing.

== International career ==
Scott has played in under 20 and senior level of International Football. Scott made his senior debut with the Bermuda national football team in a 0–0 friendly tie with Guatemala on 15 October 2019.

== Career statistics ==
=== Club ===
As of matches played 17 August 2024

Appearances and goals by club, season and competition
Club	Season	League			FA Cup		League Cup		Other		Total	
Club	Season	Division	Apps	Goals	Apps	Goals	Apps	Goals	Apps	Goals	Apps	Goals
Kidderminster Harriers	2018–19	National League North	0	0	0	0	—		0	0	0	0
Kidderminster Harriers	2019–20	National League North	3	0	0	0	—		0	0	3	0
Kidderminster Harriers	Total		3	0	0	0	0	0	0	0	3	0
Alvechurch (loan)	2019–20	Southern League Premier Division	0	0	0	0	—		0	0	0	0
Hastings United	2020–21	Isthmian League South East Division	2	0	0	0	—		2 (Note: Appearances FA Trophy)	0	4	0
Hastings United	2021–22	Isthmian League South East Division	24	2	1	0	—		2 (Note: Sussex Senior Cup)	0	27	2
Hastings United	2022–23	Isthmian League South East Division	34	2	0	0	—		5 (Note: Appearances in the FA Trophy, Velocity Cup & Sussex Senior Cup)	2	39	4
Hastings United	2023–24	Isthmian League South East Division	3	0	0	0	—		1	0	4	0
Hastings United	Total		63	4	1	0	0	0	10	2	74	6
Lancing	2023–24	Isthmian League South East Division	27	3	0	0	—		0	0	27	3
Eastbourne Town	2024–25	Isthmian League South East Division	1	0	2	0	—		0	0	3	0
Career total			94	7	3	0	0	0	10	0	104	9

=== International ===
As of match played 15 October 2024

Appearances and goals by national team and year
National team	Year	Apps	Goals
Bermuda	2019	1	0
Bermuda	2021	3	1
Bermuda	2022	1	0
Bermuda	2023	4	0
Bermuda	2024	7	1
Total		16	2

As of match played 15 October 2024

List of international goals scored by Knory Scott
No.	Date	Venue	Cap	Opponent	Score	Result	Competition	Ref.
1	31 March 2021	IMG Academy Stadium, Bradenton, United States	5	Aruba	4–0	5–0	2022 FIFA World Cup qualification	
2	12 October 2024	Bermuda National Stadium, Hamilton, Bermuda	15	Dominica	1–6	4–1	2024–25 CONCACAF Nations League B	

== Honours ==
Hastings United

- Isthmian League South East Division: 2021–22
