= Romario Martin =

Kittian and Nevisian professional footballer

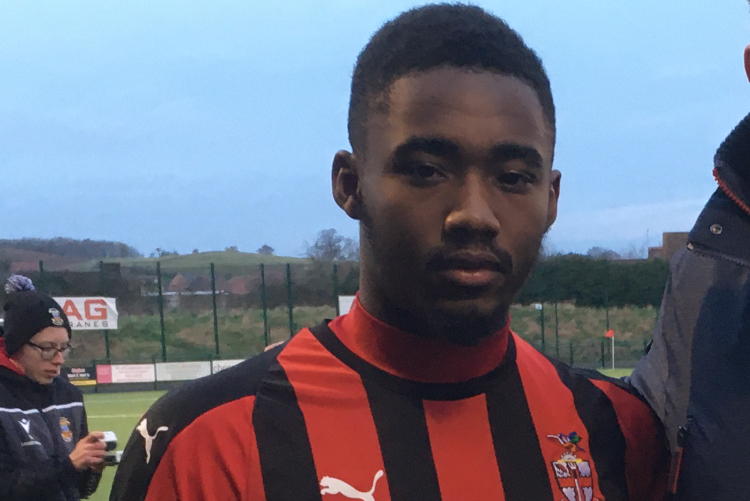
- Martin in February 2020

Personal information
- Full name: Romario Tyrese Martin
- Date of birth: 30 August 1999 (age 27)
- Place of birth: Basseterre, Saint Kitts and Nevis
- Height: 1.86 m (6 ft 1 in)
- Position: Forward

Team information
- Current team: Redditch United

Youth career
- Walsall

Senior career*
Years	Team	Apps	(Gls)
2015–2016	Continental Star		
2016–2018	Solihull Moors	2	(0)
2016–2017	→ Barwell (loan)		
2017	→ Highgate United (loan)		
2018	→ Romulus (loan)		
2018	Hednesford Town		
2018	Rugby Town		
2019	Nuneaton Borough		
2019	Coleshill Town	1	(0)
2019–	Redditch United	12	(2)
2019	→ Romulus (dual)		

International career^{‡}
2017–	Saint Kitts and Nevis U20	3	(1)
2017–	Saint Kitts and Nevis	1	(1)
- * Club domestic league appearances and goals as of 20:00, 24 February 2020 (UTC) ‡ National team caps and goals as of 20:00, 24 February 2020 (UTC)

Romario Tyrese Martin (born 30 August 1999) is a Kittian and Nevisian professional footballer who currently plays for Southern League Premier Division Central side Redditch United, where he plays as a forward.

== Club career ==
Born in Basseterre, Saint Kitts and Nevis, Martin grew up in Birmingham, West Midlands and started his career in the youth team at Walsall. He later joined Midland Football League side Continental Star before he signed for the Academy at Solihull Moors in the summer of 2016. In October 2016, he joined Northern Premier League Premier Division side Barwell on loan. Whilst still part of the Solihull Moors Academy he spent two weeks on trial at EFL League Two side Grimsby Town in early 2017. On 17 March 2017 he joined Midland Football League side Highgate United on loan until the end of the season.

On 28 October 2017 he made his first team debut for Solihull in the National League replacing Akwasi Asante as a late substitute in the 4–0 defeat to AFC Fylde. He made a further three appearances for the first team before he signed for Northern Premier League Division One South side Romulus on loan.

Martin signed for Southern League Premier Central side Nuneaton Borough on 7 June 2019. Romario departed Nuneaton Borough on 29 August 2019, joining Southern League Division One Central side Coleshill Town.

On 14 September 2019, Martin left Coleshill Town and returned to the Southern League Premier Central, signed for Redditch United, who had spent some time on trial with earlier in the season. Martin scored his first and second goals for Redditch United in a 3-2 victory over Nuneaton Borough on 22 February 2020, following on from a 30 game losing streak.

== International career ==
Martin received his first call-up to Saint Kitts and Nevis in February 2017 to the under-20 side for qualification matches for the 2017 FIFA U-20 World Cup. He made three appearances as the side were eliminated in the group stages scoring once in the 4–1 defeat to the United States.

== Career statistics ==
=== Club ===
As of match played 13 January 2018

Appearances and goals by club, season and competition
Club	Season	League			FA Cup		League Cup		Other		Total	
Club	Season	Division	Apps	Goals	Apps	Goals	Apps	Goals	Apps	Goals	Apps	Goals
Solihull Moors	2017–18	National League	2	0	0	0	—		2 (Note: Appearances in the FA Trophy)	0	4	0
Career total			2	0	0	0	—		2	0	4	0

=== International ===
As of match played 2 December 2017

Appearances and goals by national team and year
National team	Year	Apps	Goals
Saint Kitts and Nevis	2017	1	1
Total		1	1
