= Jonathan Klinsmann =

German football player (born 1997)

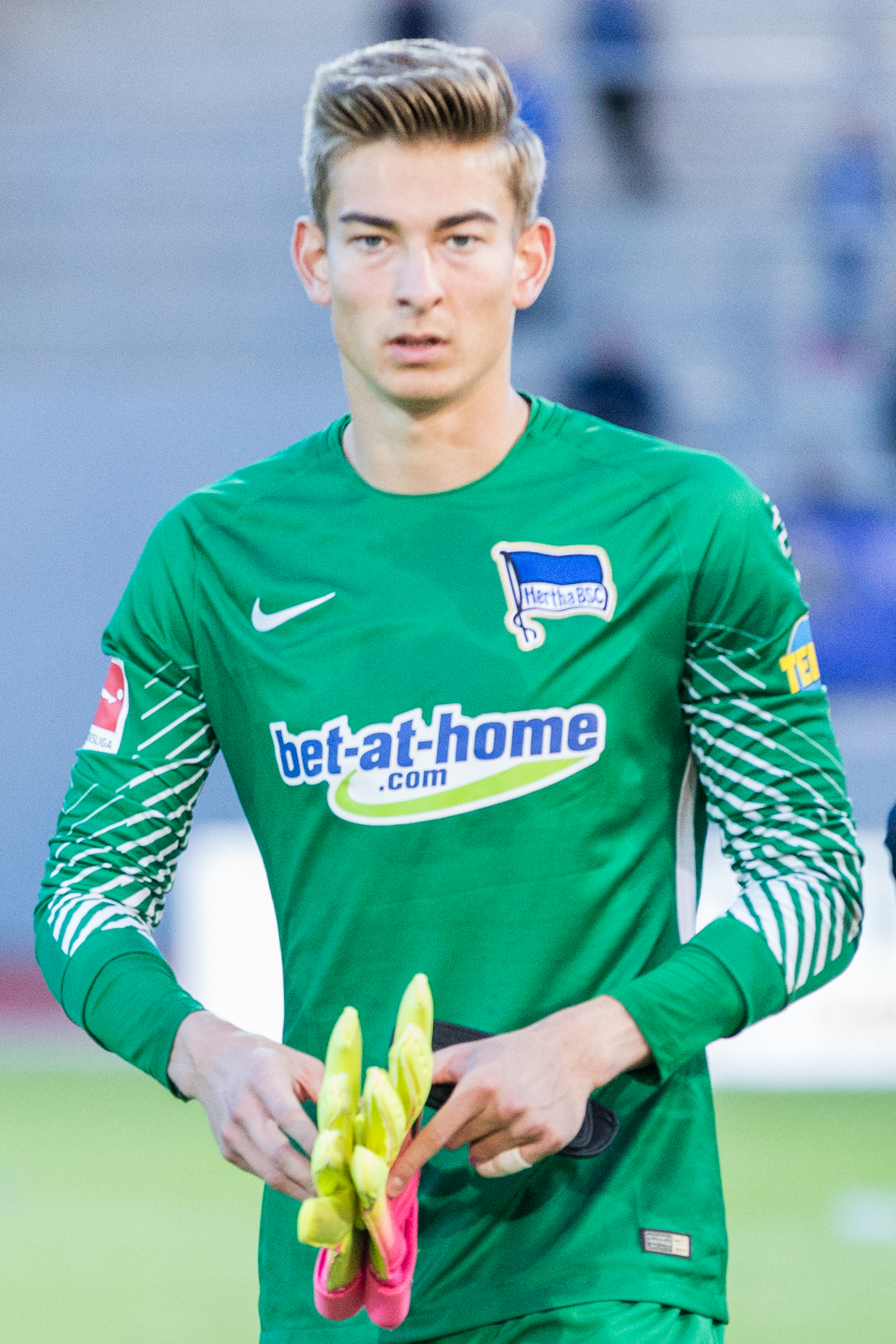
- Klinsmann in 2017

Personal information
- Full name: Jonathan Lee Klinsmann
- Date of birth: April 8, 1997 (age 29)
- Place of birth: Munich, Germany
- Height: 6 ft 4 in (1.93 m)
- Position: Goalkeeper

Team information
- Current team: Cesena
- Number: 33

Youth career
- 2005–2007: FC Blades 96
- 2008: Irvine Lasers
- 2008–2009: Bayern Munich
- 2010–2011: Pateadores FC Irvine
- 2012–2014: Strikers FC

College career
Years	Team	Apps	(Gls)
2015–2017	California Golden Bears	22	(0)

Senior career*
Years	Team	Apps	(Gls)
2017–2019	Hertha BSC II	24	(0)
2017–2019	Hertha BSC	0	(0)
2019–2020	St. Gallen	0	(0)
2020–2023	LA Galaxy II	17	(0)
2021–2023	LA Galaxy	3	(0)
2024–	Cesena	63	(0)

International career^{‡}
2014–2015	United States U18	9	(0)
2015–2017	United States U20	21	(0)
2019	United States U23	2	(0)
Medal record
Representing United States
First place	CONCACAF Under-20 Championship	2017
- * Club domestic league appearances and goals as of May 13, 2026 ‡ National team caps and goals as of June 4, 2017

Jonathan Lee Klinsmann (born April 8, 1997) is a professional soccer player who plays as a goalkeeper for Serie B club Cesena. Born in Germany, he is a former youth international for the United States. He is the son of German former player and manager Jürgen Klinsmann.

== Early life ==
Jonathan Klinsmann was born in Munich, Germany, on April 8, 1997, to German former soccer player and manager Jürgen Klinsmann and American former model Debbie Chin. From 1998 to 2008, Jonathan lived with his parents in Newport Beach, California. He then moved back to Munich in 2008 until the end of 2009, while his father was manager of Bayern Munich. Klinsmann graduated in 2015 from Mater Dei High School in Santa Ana, California, and from 2015 to 2017 attended the University of California, Berkeley. He has both American and German citizenship. In addition to soccer, Klinsmann also played basketball in his time at the Mater Dei High School.

=== Youth soccer ===
Klinsmann spent most of his youth playing as a striker at FC Blades 96 and the Irvine Lasers. He transitioned to goalkeeper only with his move to the Bayern Munich youth academy. Upon his return to California, he became part of the U.S. Soccer Development Academy, and henceforth played for Pateadores FC and then at Irvine Strikers FC. In parallel, he played from 2011 to 2014 for his high school team MDHS Varsity Soccer. In the 2014 season, he completed 33 games for the Strikers in the Development Academy and reached the finals of the National Championship. From 2015 to 2017, Klinsmann played for the California Golden Bears, where he made 22 appearances.

== Club career ==
=== Hertha BSC ===
After having spent most of his school holidays between 2014 and 2017 with the youth teams of his father's home club VfB Stuttgart, Klinsmann completed part of his preparation for the 2017 FIFA U-20 World Cup at VfB Stuttgart II, West Ham United and Everton. After initial interest from Eintracht Braunschweig, Klinsmann completed a ten-day trial from July 3, 2017, with Hertha BSC. Even before the ten-day trial was over, Klinsmann signed professionally on July 11, with the contract lasting until June 30, 2019.

Klinsmann made his professional debut for Hertha BSC in the UEFA Europa League on December 7, 2017, in which he saved a penalty in a 1–1 home draw against Östersunds FK.

=== Los Angeles Galaxy ===
On August 20, 2020, Klinsmann signed a three-year contract with LA Galaxy of Major League Soccer (MLS).

=== Cesena ===
On February 1, 2024, Klinsmann signed a 2.5-year contract with Cesena, then in the Italian third-tier Serie C. In the first months at Cesena he made only one appearance in Serie C, where veteran Matteo Pisseri remained head coach Michele Mignani's first choice goalkeeper. In April 2024 the team got promoted to Serie B for the 2024/25 season. Klinsmann became a regular starter in late October, after he made his Serie B debut in a 1:1 draw against Salernitana.

== International career ==
Jonathan Klinsmann is available to represent Germany from his father's line, the United States, Hong Kong and China from his mother's line. He holds both German and American citizenship.

Klinsmann has been active for the youth teams of the United States since 2014. From 2014 to 2015, he was a member of the under-18 team. In 2017, Klinsmann was included in the squad for the under-20 national team at the 2017 CONCACAF U-20 Championship. He played in all but one of the six tournament matches. The United States were crowned under-20 champions of CONCACAF following a 5–3 win on penalties in the final against Honduras. Klinsmann was awarded the golden glove as the best goalkeeper of the tournament, and included in the team of the tournament. In addition, the United States qualified for the 2017 FIFA U-20 World Cup in South Korea, where Klinsmann started in all five matches. The United States were eliminated from the tournament following a 1–2 defeat after extra time in the quarter-finals against eventual losing finalists Venezuela.

On November 12, 2018, Klinsmann was called up for the first time to the United States men's national soccer team for friendlies against England and Italy as an injury replacement for Zack Steffen.

== Career statistics ==
=== Club ===
As of July 10, 2023

Club	Season	League			National cup (Note: Includes Swiss Cup, U.S. Open Cup)		Continental		Total	
Club	Season	Division	Apps	Goals	Apps	Goals	Apps	Goals	Apps	Goals
Hertha BSC II	2017–18	Regionalliga Nordost	10	0	—		—		10	0
Hertha BSC II	2018–19	Regionalliga Nordost	14	0	—		—		14	0
Hertha BSC II	Total		24	0	—		—		24	0
Hertha BSC	2017–18	Bundesliga	0	0	—		1 (Note: Appearance in UEFA Europa League)	0	1	0
FC St. Gallen	2019–20	Swiss Super League	0	0	2	0	—		2	0
LA Galaxy	2020	MLS	4	0	—		—		4	0
LA Galaxy	2021	MLS	3	0	—		—		3	0
LA Galaxy	2022	MLS	0	0	4	0	—		4	0
LA Galaxy	2023	MLS	10	0	2	0	—		12	0
LA Galaxy	Total		17	0	6	0	—		23	0
LA Galaxy II	2021	USL	3	0	—		—		3	0
Career total			44	0	8	0	1	0	53	0

== Honors ==
United States U20

- CONCACAF Under-20 Championship: 2017

Individual

- CONCACAF Under-20 Championship Golden Glove: 2017
- CONCACAF Under-20 Championship Best XI: 2017
