= Kathon St. Hillaire =

Trinidadian footballer (born 1997)

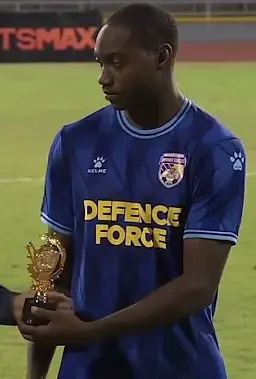
- Kathon St. Hillaire receiving Man Of The Match award in Feb 2024 for Defence Force

Personal information
- Full name: Kathon Kenroy St. Hillaire
- Date of birth: 5 November 1997 (age 29)
- Place of birth: Port of Spain, Trinidad and Tobago
- Height: 1.83 m (6 ft 0 in)
- Position: Forward

Team information
- Current team: Defence Force

Senior career*
Years	Team	Apps	(Gls)
2017–2018	St. Ann's Rangers		
2018	Defence Force	0	(0)
2018–2019	SC Znojmo	5	(1)
2019	ŠKF Sereď	3	(0)
2019	San Juan Jabloteh		
2019–2020	SC Znojmo	12	(1)
2020–2021	FK Poprad	21	(3)
2021–2023	KS Krapkowice		
2024–	Defence Force		

International career
2017	Trinidad and Tobago U20	3	(2)
2017–2019	Trinidad and Tobago	4	(0)
- * Club domestic league appearances and goals as of 26 November 2025

Kathon Kenroy St. Hillaire (born 5 November 1997) is a Trinidadian footballer who plays for Defence Force.

== Club career ==
St. Hillaire began playing football at the East Mucurapo Secondary School, where he helped them to the 2014 National Intercol tournament title. The following year he enrolled at the St. Anthony's College, where he continued playing football in the Secondary Schools Football League Premier Division. With St. Anthony's College he won the North Zone Intercol trophy in 2015.

In early 2017 he joined TT Pro League club St. Ann's Rangers, but joined Defence Force the following year, making his debut in a 4–0 First Citizens Cup win against San Juan Jabloteh on 10 June 2018.

The following month he moved to Czechia, joining Czech National Football League club SC Znojmo, penning a three-year deal in July 2018, following a two-week trial. He scored his first goal for the club on 17 August 2018 against FK Třinec in a 2–0 win. After two goals in his first seven games for the club, he left Czechia after being called up to the Trinidad and Tobago national team. On his return to the Eastern European nation, he struggled with receiving a new visa.

Despite signing a three-year deal, he left the club the following year, spending a brief period with Slovak Super Liga club ŠKF Sereď, before returning to Trinidad and Tobago to join San Juan Jabloteh. He returned to SC Znojmo later in 2019, before joining Slovak 2. Liga club FK Poprad the following year. Despite finishing as the team's top scorer in the 2020–21 season with three goals, he was unable to help prevent Poprad being relegated.

== Career statistics ==
=== Club ===
As of 26 November 2025.

Appearances and goals by club, season and competition
Club	Season	League			Cup		Other		Total	
Club	Season	Division	Apps	Goals	Apps	Goals	Apps	Goals	Apps	Goals
Defence Force	2018	TT Pro League	0	0	0	0	1 (Note: Appearances in the First Citizens Cup)	0	1	0
SC Znojmo	2018–19	Czech National Football League	5	1	2 (Note: Appearances in the Czech Cup)	1	0	0	7	2
ŠKF Sereď	2018–19	Slovak Super Liga	3	0	0	0	0	0	3	0
SC Znojmo	2019–20	MSFL	11	1	0	0	0	0	11	1
SC Znojmo	2020–21	MSFL	1	0	0	0	0	0	1	0
SC Znojmo	Total		12	1	0	0	0	0	12	1
FK Poprad	2020–21	2. Liga	21	3	0	0	0	0	21	3
Career total			41	5	2	1	1	0	44	6

=== International ===
As of match played 11 August 2019.

National team	Year	Apps	Goals
Trinidad and Tobago	2017	1	0
Trinidad and Tobago	2018	2	0
Trinidad and Tobago	2019	1	0
Total		4	0
