= Fernando Castro (Brazilian footballer) =

Brazilian footballer (born 1997)

Personal information
- Full name: Fernando Augusto de Castro Ribeiro
- Date of birth: 30 March 1997 (age 29)
- Place of birth: Orlândia, Brazil
- Height: 1.95 m (6 ft 5 in)
- Position: Goalkeeper

Youth career
- Botafogo-SP
- Olé Brasil
- 2010–2018: Santos

Senior career*
Years	Team	Apps	(Gls)
2018–2020	Bahia	8	(0)
2020–2022	Arouca	13	(0)
- * Club domestic league appearances and goals as of 05:17, 12 October 2021 (UTC)

Fernando Augusto de Castro Ribeiro (born 30 March 1997), better known as Fernando Castro or just Fernando, is a Brazilian footballer who plays as a goalkeeper.

== Club career ==
Born in Orlândia, São Paulo, Fernando Castro joined Santos' youth setup in 2010, from Botafogo-SP. On 1 March 2016, he renewed his contract with the club until the end of 2018.

On 19 April 2018, Fernando Castro signed a two-year contract with fellow Série A club Bahia, after terminating his contract with Peixe. He made his professional debut on 2 September, coming on as a half-time substitute for injured Douglas Friedrich in a 2–0 away defeat to Atlético Paranaense.

On 13 June 2020, after being mainly a third-choice, Fernando Castro moved abroad and joined Liga Portugal 2 side Arouca on a three-year contract.

== Personal life ==
Fernando Castro's mother Solange was a professional basketball player, and appeared in the 1983 Pan American Games. She died in 2017 due to a lymphoma.

== Career statistics ==
As of 16 November 2020

Club	Season	League			State League		Cup		Continental		Other		Total	
Club	Season	Division	Apps	Goals	Apps	Goals	Apps	Goals	Apps	Goals	Apps	Goals	Apps	Goals
Bahia	2018	Série A	2	0	0	0	0	0	—		0	0	2	0
Bahia	2019	Série A	0	0	2	0	0	0	—		0	0	2	0
Bahia	2020	Série A	0	0	4	0	0	0	0	0	0	0	4	0
Bahia	Total		2	0	6	0	0	0	0	0	0	0	8	0
Arouca	2020–21	Liga Portugal 2	2	0	—		0	0	—		0	0	2	0
Career total			4	0	6	0	0	0	0	0	0	0	10	0

== Honours ==
Bahia

- Campeonato Baiano: 2018, 2019, 2020
