= Marvin Márquez =

Salvadoran footballer (born 1998)

Personal information
- Full name: Marvin Roberto Márquez Joya
- Date of birth: 12 March 1998 (age 28)
- Place of birth: San Salvador, El Salvador
- Height: 1.81 m (5 ft 11 in)
- Position: Forward

Team information
- Current team: Isidro Metapán
- Number: 7

Senior career*
Years	Team	Apps	(Gls)
2015–2017	Alianza	4	(0)
2017–2018	Dragón	21	(3)
2018–2019	Chalatenango	31	(5)
2019–	Isidro Metapán	55	(5)

International career^{‡}
2017	El Salvador U20	5	(1)
2018	El Salvador U21	3	(1)
2021	El Salvador U23	3	(1)
2021–	El Salvador	1	(0)
- * Club domestic league appearances and goals as of 21:27, 12 July 2021 (UTC) ‡ National team caps and goals as of 21:27, 12 July 2021 (UTC)

Marvin Roberto Márquez Joya (born 12 March 1998) is a Salvadoran professional footballer who plays as a forward for the club Isidro Metapán, and the El Salvador national team.

== International career ==
Márquez was called up to represent the El Salvador national team at the 2021 CONCACAF Gold Cup. He debuted with the El Salvador national team in a 2–0 Gold Cup win over Guatemala on 11 July 2021, assisting his side's first goal in the 81st minute.
