= Nicholas Dillon =

Trinidadian professional footballer

Personal information
- Date of birth: 25 March 1997 (age 29)
- Place of birth: Couva, Trinidad and Tobago
- Height: 1.83 m (6 ft 0 in)
- Position: Winger

Youth career
- 2006–2011: W Connection
- 2011–2014: Central F.C.

Senior career*
Years	Team	Apps	(Gls)
2014–2017	Central F.C.		
2017–2019	Maasmechelen	7	(1)
2019	Al-Mujazzal		

International career^{‡}
2017	Trinidad and Tobago U20	3	(0)
2018–	Trinidad and Tobago	1	(0)
- * Club domestic league appearances and goals as of 12:53, 4 September 2020 (UTC) ‡ National team caps and goals as of 13 October 2018

Nicholas Dillon (born 25 March 1997) is a Trinidadian professional footballer who plays as a winger.

== International career ==
Dillon made his debut for the Trinidad and Tobago national football team in a 1–0 friendly loss to Panama on 18 April 2018.
