= Paul Douglas (footballer) =

Bermudan footballer

Personal information
- Date of birth: 7 August 1997 (age 29)
- Place of birth: Hamilton, Bermuda
- Height: 1.80 m (5 ft 11 in)
- Position: Midfielder

Team information
- Current team: Stratford Town

Youth career
- Bermuda Hogges
- 2015–2017: Ilkeston Town

Senior career*
Years	Team	Apps	(Gls)
2019	Redditch United	3	(0)
2019–2020	Alvechurch	2	(0)
2020–	Stratford Town	1	(0)

International career^{‡}
2017	Bermuda U20	3	(0)
2019–	Bermuda	4	(0)
- * Club domestic league appearances and goals as of 15:44, 6 June 2020 (UTC) ‡ National team caps and goals as of 15:44, 6 June 2020 (UTC)

Paul Douglas (born 7 August 1997) is a Bermudan footballer who currently plays as a midfielder for Alvechurch.

== Career statistics ==
=== International ===
As of matches played 6 June 2020.

National team	Year	Apps	Goals
Bermuda	2019	3	0
Bermuda	2020	1	0
Total		4	0
