= Liam Evans (footballer) =

Bermudian association football player

Personal information
- Date of birth: 1 May 1997 (age 29)
- Place of birth: Hamilton, Bermuda
- Position: Defender

College career
Years	Team	Apps	(Gls)
2015–2018	Northern Kentucky Norse	42	(0)

Senior career*
Years	Team	Apps	(Gls)
2013–2015	Robin Hood		

International career^{‡}
- Bermuda U17
- Bermuda U20
2018–	Bermuda	5	(1)
- * Club domestic league appearances and goals ‡ National team caps and goals as of 21 June 2019

Liam Evans (born 1 May 1997) is a Bermudian professional footballer who plays for the Bermudian national team.

Evans played in the Little League World Series Caribbean qualifiers in his youth. For secondary school he attended the prestigious Saltus Grammar School, where he played football, basketball, volleyball, badminton, track and field, softball, table tennis, tennis, cricket, and cross country. His senior year he was given Denton Hurdle Award for Bermuda's top high school athlete while also playing in the Bermudian Premier Division with Robin Hood. He then accepted a scholarship and played four years at Northern Kentucky University.

== International career ==
His first international appearance was with the Bermuda U17s in 2013. In 2017, he debuted with a national under-20 team, in a 1–1 draw against Trinidad and Tobago. In 2018, he made his senior debut to the team with the 0–0 draw to Barbados national football team. On 12 October 2018, he scored his first international goal against non-FIFA member Sint Maarten in a 12–0 victory during the qualifying matches of the CONCACAF Nations League. He described it as "a crazy feeling" in front of the home crowd.

=== International goals ===
Scores and results list Bermuda's goal tally first.

No.	Date	Venue	Opponent	Score	Result	Competition
1.	12 October 2018	Bermuda National Stadium, Hamilton, Bermuda	Sint Maarten	8–0	12–0	2019–20 CONCACAF Nations League qualification

== Honours ==
=== Club ===
Robin Hood

- Bermudian First Division: 2013–14

== Personal life ==
His father is Bermudian and his mother is from New York.
