= Tehvan Tyrell =

Bermudian footballer

Tevahn Tyrell
Personal information
- Date of birth: 16 March 1997 (age 29)
- Place of birth: Hamilton, Bermuda
- Height: 1.90 m (6 ft 3 in)
- Position: Forward

Team information
- Current team: Brandon United
- Number: 10

International career^{‡}
| Years | Team | Apps | (Gls) |
- Bermuda U20
| 2018– | Bermuda | 3 | (1) |
- ‡ National team caps and goals as of 12 October 2018

Tevahn Tyrell (born 16 March 1997) is a Bermudian professional footballer who plays for Brandon United and the Bermuda national team. Besides Bermuda, he has played in England.

== International career ==
In 2017, Tyrell debuted with the Bermudian U20s in a 1–1 draw against Trinidad and Tobago. In 2018, he made his senior debut in a 0–0 draw against Barbados. On 12 October 2018, he scored his first international goal against non-FIFA member Sint Maarten in a 12–0 victory during the qualifying matches of the CONCACAF Nations League.

== Personal life ==
He appeared on the 2023 BBC documentary Boot Dreams: Now or Never, about young footballers trying to gain a professional contract.

== Career statistics ==
=== International goals ===
Scores and results list Bermuda's goal tally first.

| No. | Date | Venue | Opponent | Score | Result | Competition |
|---|---|---|---|---|---|---|
| 1. | 12 October 2018 | Bermuda National Stadium, Hamilton, Bermuda | Sint Maarten | 9–0 | 12–0 | 2019–20 CONCACAF Nations League qualification |
