= Roberto Domínguez (footballer) =

Salvadoran footballer (born 1997)

Personal information
- Full name: Roberto Carlos Domínguez Fuentes
- Date of birth: 9 May 1997 (age 29)
- Place of birth: Chalatenango, El Salvador
- Height: 1.81 m (5 ft 11 in)
- Position: Centre back

Team information
- Current team: Inter Santa Tecla
- Number: 3

Youth career
- 2013–2014: Turín FESA

Senior career*
| Years | Team | Apps | (Gls) |
| 2014–2015 | Juventud Independiente | 33 | (0) |
| 2015–2019 | Santa Tecla | 131 | (1) |
| 2018 | → Vancouver Whitecaps FC (loan) | 0 | (0) |
| 2019 | → FAS (loan) | 20 | (1) |
| 2020 | Bolívar | 20 | (2) |
| 2021 | Partizani Tirana | 2 | (0) |
| 2021–2022 | Chalatenango | 32 | (0) |
| 2022–2024 | FAS | 74 | (2) |
| 2024–2026 | Isidro Metapán | 39 | (2) |
| 2026– | Inter Santa Tecla | | |

International career^{‡}
| 2014–2017 | El Salvador U20 | 12 | (2) |
| 2014 | El Salvador U21 | 2 | (0) |
| 2015 | El Salvador U23 | 0 | (0) |
| 2015– | El Salvador | 68 | (1) |
- * Club domestic league appearances and goals as of 08:14, 29 May 2025 (UTC) ‡ National team caps and goals as of 08:14, 29 May 2025 (UTC)

Roberto Carlos Domínguez Fuentes (born 9 May 1997) is a Salvadoran professional footballer who plays as a centre back for Primera División club Inter Santa Tecla and the El Salvador national team.

== International career ==
=== Youth ===
Dominguez has played for El Salvador at the under-17, under-20 and under-21 levels.

=== Senior ===
Dominguez made his international debut for El Salvador he started and played 90 minutes in a World Cup Qualifying match against Mexico on 13 November 2015.

== Career statistics ==
=== International goals ===
Scores and results list El Salvador's goal tally first.

| No. | Date | Venue | Opponent | Score | Result | Competition |
|---|---|---|---|---|---|---|
| 1 | 12 October 2019 | Blakes Estate Stadium, Lookout, Montserrat | Montserrat | 1–0 | 2–0 | 2019–20 CONCACAF Nations League B |

== Honours ==
- Santa Tecla
  - Primera División: (3) Clausura 2015, Apertura 2016, Clausura 2017
