= Antigua and Barbuda national under-20 football team =

Antigua and Barbuda
- Nickname: Benna Boys
- Association: Antigua and Barbuda Football Association
- Confederation: CONCACAF (North and Central America and the Caribbean)
- Sub-confederation: CFU (Caribbean)
- Head coach: (Antigua and Barbuda) George Warner
- Home stadium: Sir Vivian Richards Stadium, Antigua Recreation Ground
First colours	Second colours

The Antigua and Barbuda national under-20 football team represents Antigua and Barbuda in international football at this age level and is controlled by the Antigua and Barbuda Football Association.

== Current squad ==
- The following 21 players were called up for the 2026 CONCACAF U-20 Championship.

No.	Pos.	Player	Date of birth (age)	Club
1	GK	Gavin Gonsalves	24 April 2008 (aged 18)	(United States Soccer Federation) Miami Strikers FC
2	DF	Jordan Francis	26 May 2007 (aged 19)	(Antigua and Barbuda Football Association) FC Aston Villa
3	DF	Ivan Grant	22 August 2007 (aged 18)	(Antigua and Barbuda Football Association) Guydadli FC
4	DF	Joshua Roache	25 December 2008 (aged 17)	(Antigua and Barbuda Football Association) All Saints United
5	FW	Jevaughn Jarvis	30 January 2007 (aged 19)	(Antigua and Barbuda Football Association) Garden Stars FC
6	MF	Dajari Barthley	13 November 2007 (aged 18)	(Antigua and Barbuda Football Association) FC Aston Villa
7	MF	Satchell Brandon	12 March 2008 (aged 18)	(Antigua and Barbuda Football Association) FC Masterballerz
8	MF	Obediah Browne	25 July 2008 (aged 17)	(Antigua and Barbuda Football Association) Old Road
9	MF	Blake Philogene	28 October 2009 (aged 16)	(Antigua and Barbuda Football Association) Unattached
10	MF	Vaughn Jackson	22 September 2008 (aged 17)	(Antigua and Barbuda Football Association) FC Aston Villa
11	DF	Conroy Brown	8 April 2007 (aged 19)	(German Football Association) SG Wattenscheid 09
12	DF	Seth Layne	27 February 2008 (aged 18)	(United States Soccer Federation) Combine Soccer Academy
13	DF	Elijah Whyte	15 March 2007 (aged 19)	(Antigua and Barbuda Football Association) Green City FC
14	MF	Brenden Skillings	27 November 2008 (aged 17)	(United States Soccer Federation) One FC
15	MF	Zidaan Williams	2 April 2008 (aged 18)	(Antigua and Barbuda Football Association) Unattached
16	MF	Sedique Adams	9 October 2007 (aged 18)	(Antigua and Barbuda Football Association) All Saints United
17	MF	Jermarion Edwards	13 September 2008 (aged 17)	(Antigua and Barbuda Football Association) Green City FC
18	GK	Tegan Gumbs	26 April 2007 (aged 19)	(Antigua and Barbuda Football Association) Unattached
19	MF	Lauchland Thomas	21 July 2007 (aged 19)	(Antigua and Barbuda Football Association) Unattached
20	FW	Marco Michael	30 May 2008 (aged 18)	(Antigua and Barbuda Football Association) Unattached
21	GK	Mekhi Phillip	16 July 2010 (aged 16)	(Antigua and Barbuda Football Association) RNorth Coast FC

== FIFA U-20 World Cup Record ==
FIFA U-20 World Cup record
Year	Round	Pld	W	D	L	GF	GA
(Netherlands) 2005	Did not qualify						
(Canada) 2007	Did not qualify						
(Egypt) 2009	Did not qualify						
(Colombia) 2011	Did not qualify						
(Turkey) 2013	Did not qualify						
(New Zealand) 2015	Did not qualify						
(South Korea) 2017	Did not qualify						
(Poland) 2019	Did not qualify						
(Indonesia) 2021	Cancelled						
(Argentina) 2023	Did not qualify						
(Chile) 2025	Did not qualify						
(Azerbaijan) (Uzbekistan) 2027	To be determined						
Total	0	0	0	0	0	0	0
