= 2018 CONCACAF U-20 Championship squads =

The squad listings for the 2018 CONCACAF U-20 Championship. The squads were announced on 29 October 2018.

Upon completion of the group stage, five of the six group winners made alterations to their squad.

The nationality for each club reflects the national association (not the league) to which the club is affiliated. A flag is included for coaches who are of a different nationality than their own national team. Player names marked in bold have been capped at full international level.

== Group A ==
=== Puerto Rico ===
Head coach: (Honduras) Amado Guevara

| No. | Pos. | Player | Date of birth (age) | Club |
|---|---|---|---|---|
| 1 | GK | Joel Serrano | May 17, 1999 (aged 19) | (United States Soccer Federation) Marshalltown CC |
| 2 | DF | Edric Toro | July 14, 2000 (aged 18) | (United States Soccer Federation) Wake Forest Demon Deacons |
| 3 | DF | Diego Román | December 19, 2000 (aged 17) | (United States Soccer Federation) Regis Pride |
| 4 | DF | Daniel Arce | August 31, 2000 (aged 18) | (United States Soccer Federation) St. Francis Brooklyn Terriers |
| 5 | DF | Luis Miguel Cosme | December 12, 2000 (aged 17) | (Puerto Rican Football Federation) Bayamón |
| 6 | MF | Joseph Villafañe | November 30, 1999 (aged 18) | (Puerto Rican Football Federation) Bayamón |
| 7 | MF | Alejandro Rabell | November 12, 2001 (aged 16) | (Puerto Rican Football Federation) Bayamón |
| 8 | FW | Kevin Hernández | July 17, 2000 (aged 18) | (United States Soccer Federation) Assumption Greyhounds |
| 9 | GK | José Calderón | February 1, 2000 (aged 18) | (Uruguayan Football Association) Tanque Sisley |
| 10 | DF | Walter Rodríguez | February 14, 2001 (aged 17) | (Puerto Rican Football Federation) Bayamón |
| 11 | FW | Carlos Rivera | April 27, 2001 (aged 17) | (Puerto Rican Football Federation) Bayamón |
| 12 | FW | Kevin Montañez | July 4, 2000 (aged 18) | (Puerto Rican Football Federation) Bayamón |
| 13 | DF | Sebastián Díaz | December 15, 2000 (aged 17) | (Puerto Rican Football Federation) Metropolitan |
| 14 | MF | Marc Nieves | January 16, 1999 (aged 19) | (Puerto Rican Football Federation) Don Bosco |
| 15 | FW | Jaden Servania | July 16, 2001 (aged 17) | (United States Soccer Federation) Houston Dynamo Academy |
| 16 | DF | Eduardo Vélez | December 22, 2000 (aged 17) | (United States Soccer Federation) Trinity Bantams |
| 17 | MF | Gerald Díaz | March 29, 1999 (aged 19) | (United States Soccer Federation) Marshalltown CC |
| 18 | DF | Nicolás Cardona | November 2, 1999 (aged 18) | (United States Soccer Federation) Assumption Greyhounds |
| 19 | MF | Lucas Arzán | January 1, 2000 (aged 18) | (United States Soccer Federation) Binghamton Bearcats |
| 20 | MF | Ian Flores | August 16, 2000 (aged 18) | (United States Soccer Federation) Oglethorpe University |

=== Saint Vincent and the Grenadines ===
Head coach: Wade Jackson

| No. | Pos. | Player | Date of birth (age) | Club |
|---|---|---|---|---|
| 1 | GK | Jadiel Chance | 8 August 1999 (aged 19) | |
| 2 | DF | Jay-Z Ryan | 22 March 2000 (aged 18) | |
| 3 | DF | Dondre Charles | 22 June 1999 (aged 19) | |
| 4 | DF | Lesron Craigg | 23 January 1999 (aged 19) | |
| 5 | DF | Javal Samuel | 30 September 1999 (aged 19) | |
| 6 | MF | Joel Quashie | 16 June 2001 (aged 17) | (Saint Vincent and the Grenadines Football Federation) Avenues United FC |
| 7 | FW | Osei Thompson | 17 November 1999 (aged 18) | |
| 8 | MF | Derron Hamblet | 29 January 2000 (aged 18) | |
| 9 | FW | Romano Johnson | 1 October 1999 (aged 19) | |
| 10 | MF | Gidson Francis | 1 April 1999 (aged 19) | |
| 11 | MF | Carlos Solomon | 10 May 1999 (aged 19) | |
| 12 | MF | Alpheus Medica | 30 January 2001 (aged 17) | |
| 13 | GK | Jellando John | 16 April 2001 (aged 17) | |
| 14 | DF | Kenyon Delpesche | 4 February 1999 (aged 19) | |
| 15 | DF | Dexran Wilson | 21 September 2000 (aged 18) | |
| 16 | MF | Diel Spring | 26 December 2000 (aged 17) | (Saint Vincent and the Grenadines Football Federation) Fitz Hughes Predators |
| 17 | FW | Trivis Fraser | 21 September 1999 (aged 19) | |
| 18 | MF | Danny Spencer | 17 January 2002 (aged 16) | |
| 19 | FW | Trezine Da Souza | 11 May 2000 (aged 18) | |
| 20 | FW | Brandon Johnson | 18 July 1999 (aged 19) | |

=== Suriname ===
Head coach: Eugene Verwey

| No. | Pos. | Player | Date of birth (age) | Club |
|---|---|---|---|---|
| 1 | GK | Rivaldo Soesman | 16 February 2000 (aged 18) | |
| 2 | DF | Mgwenze Vola | 22 March 2000 (aged 18) | (Royal Dutch Football Association) A.V.V. Zeeburgia |
| 3 | DF | Michiel Revales | 20 January 2000 (aged 18) | |
| 4 | DF | Isiah Helstone | 29 December 1999 (aged 18) | (Surinamese Football Association) S.V. Robinhood |
| 5 | DF | Doniel Wijdenbosch | 6 May 1999 (aged 19) | |
| 6 | MF | Abraham Graves | 5 October 1999 (aged 19) | |
| 7 | FW | Joshua Foe A Man | 23 January 1999 (aged 19) | (Royal Dutch Football Association) A.V.V. Zeeburgia |
| 8 | MF | Roscello Vlijter | 1 January 2000 (aged 18) | (Royal Dutch Football Association) Feyenoord |
| 9 | FW | Alvaro Verwey | 12 January 1999 (aged 19) | (Surinamese Football Association) WBC |
| 10 | FW | Gleofilo Vlijter | 17 September 1999 (aged 19) | |
| 11 | FW | Ferando Hoepel | 5 July 2002 (aged 16) | (Surinamese Football Association) S.V. Transvaal |
| 12 | DF | Urano Morris | 13 September 1999 (aged 19) | |
| 13 | GK | Damelcio Fer | 13 October 2002 (aged 16) | |
| 14 | MF | Brian Elshot | 18 January 2000 (aged 18) | (Surinamese Football Association) Leo Victor |
| 15 | FW | Damian Brunswijk | 27 January 2000 (aged 18) | |
| 16 | DF | Zerguinho Deira | 23 July 2002 (aged 16) | (Surinamese Football Association) S.V. Transvaal |
| 17 | MF | Jamilhio Rigters | 11 November 1999 (aged 18) | (Surinamese Football Association) S.V. Robinhood |
| 18 | FW | Ayad Godlieb | 2 January 1999 (aged 19) | (Surinamese Football Association) S.V. Robinhood |
| 19 | FW | Shaquille Cairo | 16 October 2001 (aged 17) | |
| 20 | FW | Rievaldo Doorson | 21 April 2000 (aged 18) | (Surinamese Football Association) S.V. Transvaal |

=== Trinidad and Tobago ===
Head coach: Russell Latapy

| No. | Pos. | Player | Date of birth (age) | Club |
|---|---|---|---|---|
| 1 | GK | Denzil Smith | 13 October 1999 (aged 19) | (Trinidad and Tobago Football Association) W Connection F.C. |
| 2 | DF | Malik Mieres | 7 January 2000 (aged 18) | (Trinidad and Tobago Football Association) Caledonia AIA |
| 3 | DF | Derron John | 3 April 1999 (aged 19) | (Trinidad and Tobago Football Association) Club Sando F.C. |
| 4 | DF | Jackie Jerrin | 24 April 2001 (aged 17) | |
| 5 | DF | Justin Homer | 10 August 2000 (aged 18) | (United States Soccer Federation) Kean Cougars |
| 6 | FW | Isaiah Lee | 21 September 1999 (aged 19) | (United States Soccer Federation) Monroe Mustangs |
| 7 | FW | Mark Ramdeen | 1 June 2000 (aged 18) | |
| 8 | MF | Jabarry Francis | 24 April 1999 (aged 19) | (Trinidad and Tobago Football Association) Club Sando F.C. |
| 9 | FW | Jaydon Prowell | 5 August 2000 (aged 18) | (Trinidad and Tobago Football Association) North East Stars F.C. |
| 10 | MF | Judah García | 24 October 2000 (aged 18) | (Trinidad and Tobago Football Association) Point Fortin Civic F.C. |
| 11 | MF | Che Benny | 18 August 2000 (aged 18) | |
| 12 | FW | Kishon Hackshaw | 26 February 2000 (aged 18) | (Trinidad and Tobago Football Association) St. Ann's Rangers F.C. |
| 13 | FW | Nickel Orr | 26 May 2001 (aged 17) | (Trinidad and Tobago Football Association) San Juan Jabloteh F.C. |
| 14 | MF | Ethan Bonaparte | 8 August 2001 (aged 17) | |
| 15 | MF | John-Paul Rochford | 5 January 2000 (aged 18) | |
| 16 | DF | Luke Singh | 12 September 2001 (aged 17) | (Canadian Soccer Association) Toronto FC Academy |
| 17 | DF | Matthew Beal | 12 April 1999 (aged 19) | |
| 18 | DF | Kerdell Sween | 2 March 2000 (aged 18) | |
| 19 | MF | Shaqkeem Joseph | 22 December 1999 (aged 18) | |
| 20 | GK | Jabari Brice | 22 February 1999 (aged 19) | |

=== United States ===
Head coach: Tab Ramos

| No. | Pos. | Player | Date of birth (age) | Club |
|---|---|---|---|---|
| 1 | GK | Brady Scott | June 30, 1999 (age 27) | (German Football Association) 1. FC Köln |
| 2 | DF | Jaylin Lindsey | March 27, 2000 (age 26) | (United States Soccer Federation) Sporting Kansas City |
| 3 | DF | Chris Gloster | July 28, 2000 (age 26) | (German Football Association) Hannover 96 |
| 4 | DF | **Mark McKenzie** | February 25, 1999 (age 27) | (United States Soccer Federation) Philadelphia Union |
| 5 | DF | Matthew Real | July 10, 1999 (age 27) | (United States Soccer Federation) Philadelphia Union |
| 6 | MF | **Brandon Servania** | March 12, 1999 (age 27) | (United States Soccer Federation) FC Dallas |
| 7 | MF | Juan Pablo Torres | July 26, 1999 (age 27) | (Royal Belgian Football Association) Lokeren |
| 8 | MF | Alex Mendez | September 6, 2000 (age 26) | (German Football Association) SC Freiburg |
| 9 | FW | Justin Rennicks | March 20, 1999 (age 27) | (United States Soccer Federation) Indiana Hoosiers |
| 10 | MF | **Paxton Pomykal** | December 17, 1999 (age 26) | (United States Soccer Federation) FC Dallas |
| 11 | FW | **Ulysses Llanez** | April 2, 2001 (age 25) | (United States Soccer Federation) LA Galaxy II |
| 12 | GK | David Ochoa | January 16, 2001 (age 25) | (United States Soccer Federation) Real Monarchs |
| 13 | FW | (substituted off) Griffin Dorsey | March 5, 1999 (age 27) | (United States Soccer Federation) Indiana Hoosiers |
| 14 | DF | Manny Perez | February 19, 1999 (age 27) | (United States Soccer Federation) NC State Wolfpack |
| 15 | MF | (substituted off) Anthony Fontana | October 14, 1999 (age 27) | (United States Soccer Federation) Philadelphia Union |
| 16 | DF | **Julián Araujo** | August 13, 2001 (age 25) | (United States Soccer Federation) LA Galaxy |
| 17 | FW | **Ayo Akinola** | January 20, 2000 (age 26) | (Canadian Soccer Association) Toronto FC |
| 18 | MF | (substituted off) **Isaac Angking** | January 24, 2000 (age 26) | (United States Soccer Federation) New England Revolution |
| 19 | DF | **Sam Rogers** | May 17, 1999 (age 27) | (United States Soccer Federation) Seattle Sounders FC |
| 20 | MF | Frankie Amaya | September 26, 2000 (age 26) | (United States Soccer Federation) UCLA Bruins |

Replacements:

| No. | Pos. | Player | Date of birth (age) | Club |
|---|---|---|---|---|
| 22 | DF | (substituted on) **Sergiño Dest** | 3 November 2000 (aged 17) | (Royal Dutch Football Association) Ajax |
| 23 | FW | (substituted on) **Sebastian Soto** | 28 July 2000 (aged 18) | (German Football Association) Hannover 96 |
| 26 | DF | (substituted on) **Chris Richards** | 28 March 2000 (aged 18) | (German Football Association) FC Bayern Munich II |

=== United States Virgin Islands ===
Head coach: Joseph Limeburner

| No. | Pos. | Player | Date of birth (age) | Club |
|---|---|---|---|---|
| 1 | GK | Connor Querrard | 6 April 2002 (aged 16) | |
| 2 | FW | Alfred Harris | 23 January 1999 (aged 19) | |
| 3 | DF | Orion Mills | 9 September 2002 (aged 16) | |
| 4 | DF | Elton Richards | 26 February 2002 (aged 16) | |
| 5 | MF | Nakeeme Julian | 10 April 1999 (aged 19) | |
| 6 | FW | Ramesses McGuiness | 6 January 2000 (aged 18) | |
| 7 | MF | Alexi Ayala | 4 August 1999 (aged 19) | |
| 8 | FW | Shomari Francis | 31 March 2001 (aged 17) | |
| 9 | MF | Jett Blaschka | 16 September 1999 (aged 19) | (United States Soccer Federation) Marquette Golden Eagles |
| 10 | DF | Humberto Delgado | 10 March 2000 (aged 18) | |
| 11 | DF | Quinn Farrell | 26 September 2002 (aged 16) | |
| 12 | MF | Jimson St.Louis | 2 December 2002 (aged 15) | |
| 13 | FW | Ammiel Maynard | 6 September 2001 (aged 17) | |
| 14 | GK | Alex Heinle | 10 January 2000 (aged 18) | |
| 15 | DF | Grant Farrell | 29 January 2000 (aged 18) | |
| 16 | MF | Rakeem Joseph | 23 May 2000 (aged 18) | (Antigua and Barbuda Football Association) Empire FC |
| 17 | MF | Nemeth Seidon Thomas | 19 August 1999 (aged 19) | |
| 18 | FW | Nikhil Verna | 29 September 1999 (aged 19) | |
| 19 | FW | De'Vaunte Rasheed Moses | 2 November 1999 (aged 18) | (U.S. Virgin Islands Soccer Federation) La Raza FC |
| 20 | DF | John Engerman | 25 October 2000 (aged 18) | (United States Soccer Federation) Darlington Soccer Academy |

== Group B ==
=== Aruba ===
Head coach: Marvic Bermúdez

| No. | Pos. | Player | Date of birth (age) | Club |
|---|---|---|---|---|
| 1 | GK | Joshua Caspar Faro | 30 March 2001 (aged 17) | |
| 2 | DF | Javier Alejandro Jimenez Paris | 27 May 2000 (aged 18) | |
| 3 | DF | Mark Jacobs | 28 October 1999 (aged 19) | |
| 4 | DF | Diederick Luydens | 18 February 1999 (aged 19) | (Royal Dutch Football Association) Sparta Rotterdam |
| 5 | MF | Jean-Pierre Eugene Heyden | 25 February 2000 (aged 18) | (Aruba Football Federation) SV Dakota |
| 6 | DF | Jobenson Myrthil | 4 August 1999 (aged 19) | |
| 7 | DF | Glenbert Croes | 17 June 2001 (aged 17) | |
| 8 | MF | Ericson Eustin Croes | 28 November 1999 (aged 18) | (Aruba Football Federation) SV Caiquetio |
| 9 | FW | Keano Maduro | 31 October 1999 (aged 19) | (Aruba Football Federation) SV Dakota |
| 10 | MF | Kenderic Junel Poulina | 10 June 1999 (aged 19) | (Aruba Football Federation) SV River Plate Aruba |
| 11 | MF | Edward Jamir Clarissa | 26 March 2000 (aged 18) | (Aruba Football Federation) SV Deportivo Nacional |
| 12 | DF | Resef Ezequiel Gross Santana | 27 January 1999 (aged 19) | |
| 13 | DF | Adrian Jesus Koolman | 6 March 1999 (aged 19) | |
| 14 | DF | Shanyika Christopher Godoy | 30 October 1999 (aged 19) | |
| 15 | MF | Biliardo Jose Galvis Lozano | 15 July 1999 (aged 19) | |
| 16 | MF | Yanuel Emmanuel Kelly | 1 October 1999 (aged 19) | |
| 17 | FW | Shermar Miguel Monticeuex | 7 August 2000 (aged 18) | (Aruba Football Federation) SV Dakota |
| 18 | GK | Jean-Carl Christopher Henriquez | 10 March 1999 (aged 19) | |
| 19 | FW | Ciaran Benjamin Arends | 21 August 2000 (aged 18) | (Aruba Football Federation) SV La Fama |
| 20 | FW | Randi Mondesi Martina | 7 July 2000 (aged 18) | |

=== Grenada ===
Head coach: Jake Rennie

| No. | Pos. | Player | Date of birth (age) | Club |
|---|---|---|---|---|
| 1 | GK | Chad Phillip | 9 August 2000 (aged 18) | (Grenada Football Association) Paradise FC International |
| 2 | DF | Jade Ishamel Oliver | 17 November 1999 (aged 18) | (Grenada Football Association) St. John's SC |
| 3 | DF | Kriag Stephen Lett | 11 December 1999 (aged 18) | |
| 4 | DF | Jonatan David Sandy | 12 September 1999 (aged 19) | (Grenada Football Association) GBBS Mutual |
| 5 | DF | Gievanni Corin Andrew | 29 November 1999 (aged 18) | (Grenada Football Association) Paradise FC International |
| 6 | MF | Steffon Adam Abraham | 29 December 1999 (aged 18) | (Grenada Football Association) Paradise FC International |
| 7 | MF | Josh Patrick Gabriel | 30 November 1999 (aged 18) | (Grenada Football Association) GBBS Mutual |
| 8 | MF | Sherman Micheal Williams | 4 September 2000 (aged 18) | (Grenada Football Association) St. John's SC |
| 9 | FW | Rahim Stephen | 20 October 1999 (aged 19) | (Grenada Football Association) GBBS Mutual |
| 10 | MF | Montell Shondi Joseph | 7 January 2001 (aged 17) | (Grenada Football Association) Paradise FC International |
| 11 | FW | Joshua Otiamba Issac | 28 October 2000 (aged 18) | (Grenada Football Association) Paradise FC International |
| 12 | FW | Tavon Christon Joseph | 26 January 1999 (aged 19) | |
| 13 | MF | Leon Braveboy | 13 January 1999 (aged 19) | (Grenada Football Association) Hard Rock FC |
| 14 | MF | Deandre Smith | 17 February 1999 (aged 19) | (Grenada Football Association) Hard Rock FC |
| 15 | MF | Jesron Charles | 4 May 1999 (aged 19) | |
| 16 | MF | Louis Robert-Keane | 18 August 1999 (aged 19) | |
| 17 | DF | James Sean Christian | 24 February 2001 (aged 17) | (Grenada Football Association) GBBS Mutual |
| 18 | MF | Craig Stephen King | 19 November 1999 (aged 18) | |
| 19 | DF | Dorrel Pierre | 5 May 1999 (aged 19) | (Grenada Football Association) Paradise FC International |
| 20 | GK | Divonte Desmond Penny | 3 November 2000 (aged 17) | (Grenada Football Association) GBBS Mutual |

=== Jamaica ===
Head coach: Jerome Waite

| No. | Pos. | Player | Date of birth (age) | Club |
|---|---|---|---|---|
| 1 | GK | Jeadine White | 7 July 2000 (aged 18) | (Jamaica Football Federation) Cavalier |
| 2 | DF | Kimani Gibbons | 29 May 2000 (aged 18) | (Jamaica Football Federation) Portmore United F.C. |
| 3 | DF | Trey Bennett | 22 August 1999 (aged 19) | (Jamaica Football Federation) UWI F.C. |
| 4 | MF | Jeremy Verley | 9 August 2000 (aged 18) | |
| 5 | DF | Jamoi Topey | 13 January 2000 (aged 18) | (Jamaica Football Federation) Cavalier |
| 6 | DF | Damani Osei | 21 October 2000 (aged 18) | (United States Soccer Federation) Portland Timbers 2 |
| 7 | MF | Kaheem Parris | 6 January 2000 (aged 18) | (Jamaica Football Federation) Cavalier |
| 8 | FW | Leonardo Fogarthy | 7 March 1999 (aged 19) | (Jamaica Football Federation) Montego Bay United F.C. |
| 9 | FW | Nicque Daley | 19 October 2000 (aged 18) | (Jamaica Football Federation) Cavalier |
| 10 | MF | Tyreek Magee | 27 October 1999 (aged 19) | (Jamaica Football Federation) Harbour View F.C. |
| 11 | MF | Tevin Rochester | 6 February 1999 (aged 19) | (Jamaica Football Federation) Cavalier |
| 12 | DF | Maliek Howell | 27 January 1999 (aged 19) | |
| 13 | GK | Tajay Griffiths | 18 April 2000 (aged 18) | (Jamaica Football Federation) Harbour View F.C. |
| 14 | DF | Javain Brown | 9 March 1999 (aged 19) | (Jamaica Football Federation) Harbour View F.C. |
| 15 | MF | Nathan Thomas | 11 November 1999 (aged 18) | |
| 16 | DF | Casseam Priestley | 2 December 2000 (aged 17) | (Jamaica Football Federation) Harbour View F.C. |
| 17 | MF | Shandel Senior | 28 February 1999 (aged 19) | |
| 18 | MF | Ricardo McIntosh | 16 November 2000 (aged 17) | |
| 19 | MF | Leonardo Jibbison | 14 January 1999 (aged 19) | (Jamaica Football Federation) Humble Lions F.C. |
| 20 | GK | St Michael Edwards | 6 January 1999 (aged 19) | (Jamaica Football Federation) Cavalier |

=== Mexico ===
Head coach: Diego Ramírez

| No. | Pos. | Player | Date of birth (age) | Club |
|---|---|---|---|---|
| 1 | GK | Carlos Higuera | 18 November 2000 (aged 17) | (Mexican Football Federation) Club Tijuana |
| 2 | DF | Kevin Álvarez | 15 January 1999 (aged 19) | (Mexican Football Federation) C.F. Pachuca |
| 3 | DF | Gilberto Sepúlveda | 2 April 1999 (aged 19) | (Mexican Football Federation) C.D. Guadalajara |
| 4 | DF | Efraín Orona | 22 February 1999 (aged 19) | (Mexican Football Federation) C.F. Pachuca |
| 5 | DF | (substituted off) Carlos Alonso Vargas | 14 February 1999 (aged 19) | (Mexican Football Federation) Club América |
| 6 | DF | Arturo Cardenas | 15 April 1999 (aged 19) | (Mexican Football Federation) Querétaro F.C. |
| 7 | MF | Carlos Gutiérrez | 5 February 1999 (aged 19) | (Mexican Football Federation) UNAM Pumas |
| 8 | MF | Misael Domínguez | 27 October 1999 (aged 19) | (Mexican Football Federation) Cruz Azul |
| 9 | FW | José Juan Macías | 22 September 1999 (aged 19) | (Mexican Football Federation) C.D. Guadalajara |
| 10 | MF | Diego Lainez | 9 June 2000 (aged 18) | (Mexican Football Federation) Club América |
| 11 | MF | Diego Hernández | 13 August 1999 (aged 19) | (Mexican Football Federation) C.D. Guadalajara |
| 12 | GK | Luis López Payan | 20 December 1999 (aged 18) | (Mexican Football Federation) Dorados de Sinaloa |
| 13 | DF | Mario Trejo | 9 March 1999 (aged 19) | (Mexican Football Federation) Monarcas Morelia |
| 14 | DF | Oswaldo Leon | 15 June 1999 (aged 19) | (Mexican Football Federation) Club América |
| 15 | MF | Alexis Gutiérrez | 26 February 2000 (aged 18) | (Mexican Football Federation) C.D. Guadalajara |
| 16 | MF | Jose Plascencia | 18 June 1999 (aged 19) | (Mexican Football Federation) Club Necaxa |
| 17 | FW | Edgar López | 21 April 1999 (aged 19) | (Mexican Football Federation) Club Tijuana |
| 18 | MF | Alan Torres | 19 February 2000 (aged 18) | (Mexican Football Federation) C.D. Guadalajara |
| 19 | FW | Daniel Lopez | 14 March 2000 (aged 18) | (Mexican Football Federation) Club Tijuana |
| 20 | FW | Adrián Lozano | 8 May 1999 (aged 19) | (Mexican Football Federation) Santos Laguna |

Replacements:

| No. | Pos. | Player | Date of birth (age) | Club |
|---|---|---|---|---|
| 21 | MF | (substituted on) Roberto Meraz | 4 August 1999 (aged 19) | |

=== Nicaragua ===
Head coach: Mario Alfaro

| No. | Pos. | Player | Date of birth (age) | Club |
|---|---|---|---|---|
| 1 | GK | Denillson Javier Gutierrez Narvaez | 14 May 1999 (aged 19) | (Nicaraguan Football Federation) Juventus Managua |
| 2 | DF | Winston Javier Zelaya Lopez | 25 September 1999 (aged 19) | |
| 3 | DF | Luis Antonio Romero Perez | 11 June 2000 (aged 18) | (Nicaraguan Football Federation) Diriangén FC |
| 4 | FW | Franklin Fermin Torrez Rodriguez | 14 July 1999 (aged 19) | |
| 5 | FW | Pablo Jose Rodriguez Morales | 4 June 2000 (aged 18) | (Costa Rican Football Federation) A.D. San Carlos |
| 6 | DF | Alexander Caldera | 7 July 1999 (aged 19) | |
| 7 | MF | Jose Adan Silva Garcia | 1 December 1999 (aged 18) | (Nicaraguan Football Federation) Deportivo Sebaco |
| 8 | MF | Ramon Eduardo Estrada Diaz | 30 December 2000 (aged 17) | (Nicaraguan Football Federation) Real Madriz |
| 9 | FW | Ismael Antonio Mendieta Dolmo | 20 February 2001 (aged 17) | (Nicaraguan Football Federation) Diriangén FC |
| 10 | FW | Eliam Palacios | 18 March 2000 (aged 18) | |
| 11 | FW | Ricardo Hojary Rivas Gomez | 29 June 1999 (aged 19) | (Nicaraguan Football Federation) Real Estelí F.C. |
| 12 | GK | Deymark Kerby Hansack Price | 13 March 2000 (aged 18) | (Nicaraguan Football Federation) Managua F.C. |
| 13 | FW | Cristobal Ramon Aragon Sanchez | 27 January 1999 (aged 19) | (Costa Rican Football Federation) AD Juventud Escazuceña |
| 14 | DF | Raul Ernesto Davila | 4 May 2000 (aged 18) | |
| 15 | FW | Alvaro Nadyr Hernandez Sevilla | 20 October 1999 (aged 19) | (Nicaraguan Football Federation) Diriangén FC |
| 16 | DF | Michael Reynaldo Tinoco Medina | 17 August 1999 (aged 19) | |
| 17 | FW | Estarling Acuña | 25 November 1999 (aged 18) | (Nicaraguan Football Federation) Real Estelí F.C. |
| 18 | FW | Juan Luis Perez Rodriguez | 29 June 1999 (aged 19) | |
| 19 | DF | Tomas David Balladares Cerna | 17 July 1999 (aged 19) | |
| 20 | MF | Dominic Lenin Pineda Rivera | 30 September 1999 (aged 19) | (Nicaraguan Football Federation) Real Madriz |

=== Saint Martin ===
Head coach: Henri Conner

| No. | Pos. | Player | Date of birth (age) | Club |
|---|---|---|---|---|
| 1 | GK | Gabriel Honore Paines | 3 April 2002 (aged 16) | |
| 2 | MF | Nolan Freyer | 7 October 2001 (aged 17) | |
| 3 | FW | Kelvin Alison Joseph | 16 January 1999 (aged 19) | |
| 4 | DF | Steven Junior Laguerre | 9 May 2001 (aged 17) | |
| 5 | DF | Ismael Marcelin | 14 September 2001 (aged 17) | (Ligue de football de Saint-Martin) FC Marigot |
| 6 | MF | Aneudy Martinez Felix | 26 April 1999 (aged 19) | |
| 7 | DF | Johnson Miracle | 15 June 2000 (aged 18) | |
| 8 | MF | Ryan Lucas Louis | 12 May 2002 (aged 16) | |
| 9 | FW | Kearney Matthew Chance | 18 May 2001 (aged 17) | (Ligue de football de Saint-Martin) Junior Stars FC |
| 10 | MF | Isais Pagesy | 18 June 1999 (aged 19) | (Ligue de football de Saint-Martin) Junior Stars FC |
| 11 | FW | Akim Arrondell | 3 November 1999 (aged 18) | (Ligue de football de Saint-Martin) Junior Stars FC |
| 12 | MF | Jason Maccow | 23 August 1999 (aged 19) | |
| 13 | DF | Emmanuel Joshua Richardson | 15 December 2001 (aged 16) | (Ligue de football de Saint-Martin) AS Juventus de Saint-Martin |
| 14 | MF | Raphael Borrelli | 23 March 2001 (aged 17) | |
| 15 | MF | Jonas Pochette | 8 July 2000 (aged 18) | |
| 16 | GK | Nahshon Ismael Questel | 10 July 2000 (aged 18) | (Ligue de football de Saint-Martin) Junior Stars FC |
| 17 | DF | Sean Patrick Richardson | 2 October 2001 (aged 17) | |
| 18 | MF | Malik Sherlon Casimir | 19 January 2000 (aged 18) | |
| 19 | MF | Junior Ismael Jean Jacques | 17 November 2000 (aged 17) | |
| 20 | FW | Jason Deondre Arnaud | 29 August 2000 (aged 18) | |

== Group C ==
=== Antigua and Barbuda ===
Head coach: George Warner

| No. | Pos. | Player | Date of birth (age) | Club |
|---|---|---|---|---|
| 1 | GK | Jernya Oscar | 6 April 2001 (aged 17) | |
| 2 | DF | Anderson Patrick Herbert | 13 May 1999 (aged 19) | |
| 3 | MF | Rokeba Rolanzo Cordice | 11 November 1999 (aged 18) | |
| 4 | MF | Jalauen Raul Benjamin | 27 February 2001 (aged 17) | (Antigua and Barbuda Football Association) Parham F.C. |
| 5 | MF | Akeem Isaac | 18 December 1999 (aged 18) | |
| 6 | FW | Daniel Bernard Nanton | 20 January 2001 (aged 17) | |
| 7 | DF | Leroy Graham | 7 December 1999 (aged 18) | (Antigua and Barbuda Football Association) Five Islands F.C. |
| 8 | DF | Shakore Kadeem Simon | 10 February 2000 (aged 18) | (Antigua and Barbuda Football Association) Old Road F.C. |
| 9 | MF | Ahijah Kean Joseph | 15 December 1999 (aged 18) | |
| 10 | FW | Kenja Keithroy Benjamin | 11 October 1999 (aged 19) | (Antigua and Barbuda Football Association) Parham F.C. |
| 11 | MF | Javorn Benjamin | 11 February 2000 (aged 18) | |
| 12 | FW | Cristian Fernandez | 6 July 1999 (aged 19) | |
| 13 | FW | Keon Greene | 27 July 2000 (aged 18) | |
| 14 | MF | Schyan Chambers Adams | 3 April 2000 (aged 18) | |
| 15 | FW | Mackenzie Hill | 9 January 2001 (aged 17) | |
| 16 | DF | Cole Abraham Wildin | 19 August 2001 (aged 17) | |
| 17 | FW | Zayn Hakeem | 28 February 1999 (aged 19) | (The Football Association) Mansfield Town F.C. |
| 18 | MF | TJ Bramble | 9 May 2001 (aged 17) | (The Football Association) Gillingham |
| 19 | FW | Whitney Samaroo Gonsalves | 7 January 1999 (aged 19) | |
| 20 | GK | Jayden Martin | 7 November 2002 (aged 15) | (Antigua and Barbuda Football Association) Five Islands F.C. |

=== Belize ===
Head coach: Phillip Elexious Marin

| No. | Pos. | Player | Date of birth (age) | Club |
|---|---|---|---|---|
| 1 | GK | Devin John Nunez | 28 July 2001 (aged 17) | |
| 2 | MF | Andir Chi | 17 November 2000 (aged 17) | |
| 3 | DF | Patrick Fauricio Caceres Cristian | 26 June 2000 (aged 18) | |
| 4 | DF | Latrel Ivor Middleton | 3 November 1999 (aged 18) | |
| 5 | DF | Allan Scott Barillas | 13 January 1999 (aged 19) | |
| 6 | DF | Matthew William Lopez | 17 September 1999 (aged 19) | |
| 7 | MF | Rene Terrence Leslie | 12 December 1999 (aged 18) | |
| 8 | DF | Donell Eric Arzu | 27 September 1999 (aged 19) | |
| 9 | FW | Jonard Castillo | 11 December 1999 (aged 18) | |
| 10 | MF | Alexis Emil Chan | 5 August 2001 (aged 17) | |
| 11 | MF | Warren Gilbert Moss | 13 October 1999 (aged 19) | |
| 12 | GK | Kerry James Gonzalez | 3 March 1999 (aged 19) | |
| 13 | MF | Elston Austin Augustin | 11 October 1999 (aged 19) | |
| 14 | MF | Alexander Darren Scott | 17 July 1999 (aged 19) | |
| 15 | MF | Dion Cacho | 7 August 2001 (aged 17) | |
| 16 | MF | Jalen Akeen Myers | 7 May 2000 (aged 18) | |
| 17 | MF | Izon Ainsley Gill | 27 December 1999 (aged 18) | |
| 18 | MF | Hoarce Cyril Avila | 18 September 1999 (aged 19) | |
| 19 | FW | Carlos Gonzalez | 27 July 1999 (aged 19) | |
| 20 | MF | Tyreek Tyrone Muschamp | 9 May 2000 (aged 18) | |

=== Cuba ===
Head coach: Raúl González Triana

| No. | Pos. | Player | Date of birth (age) | Club |
|---|---|---|---|---|
| 1 | GK | Danny Echeverria Diaz | 21 April 2000 (aged 18) | |
| 2 | GK | Arturo Hector Godoy | 12 January 2000 (aged 18) | |
| 3 | DF | Christopher Yoel Llorente Fernandez | 21 February 2000 (aged 18) | (Football Association of Cuba) FC Cienfuegos |
| 4 | DF | Bruno Manuel Rendon Cardoso | 7 May 2000 (aged 18) | |
| 5 | DF | Omar Proenza Calderon | 9 December 1999 (aged 18) | (Football Association of Cuba) FC Camagüey |
| 6 | DF | Frank Nodarse | 6 December 2000 (aged 17) | |
| 7 | FW | Manuel Ignacio Cruz Ledesma | 20 September 2000 (aged 18) | |
| 8 | DF | Enrique Marlon Sanchez Quintana | 7 July 1999 (aged 19) | (Football Association of Cuba) FC Santiago de Cuba |
| 9 | MF | Lazaro Daniel Monzon Lorenzo | 12 January 1999 (aged 19) | |
| 10 | DF | Karel Espino | 27 October 2001 (aged 17) | |
| 11 | MF | Rivaldo Ibarra | 6 July 1999 (aged 19) | (Football Association of Cuba) FC La Habana |
| 12 | MF | Jean Carlos Rodríguez | 27 May 1999 (aged 19) | (Football Association of Cuba) FC Pinar del Río |
| 13 | MF | Josue Vega Alvarez | 27 January 2000 (aged 18) | |
| 14 | MF | Omar Pérez | 21 April 2000 (aged 18) | |
| 15 | MF | José Pérez | 15 September 1999 (aged 19) | |
| 16 | MF | Rolando Oviendo | 10 January 1999 (aged 19) | |
| 17 | MF | Geobel Pérez | 2 June 1999 (aged 19) | (Football Association of Cuba) FC La Habana |
| 18 | FW | Juan Manuel Andreus Milanes | 8 November 1999 (aged 18) | (Football Association of Cuba) FC Las Tunas |
| 19 | FW | Yandri Romero | 2 January 2000 (aged 18) | (Football Association of Cuba) FC La Habana |
| 20 | FW | Christian Flores | 6 April 1999 (aged 19) | (Football Association of Cuba) FC Santiago de Cuba |

=== Dominican Republic ===
Head coach: Orlando Capellino

| No. | Pos. | Player | Date of birth (age) | Club |
|---|---|---|---|---|
| 1 | GK | Alessandro Baroni | 14 August 1999 (aged 19) | (Portuguese Football Federation) Boavista F.C. |
| 2 | DF | Brian López | 20 November 1999 (aged 18) | |
| 3 | MF | Jose Manuel Matos Estanio | 19 September 2000 (aged 18) | |
| 4 | DF | Welvin Miguel Sanchez De Leon | 16 March 1999 (aged 19) | |
| 5 | DF | Jose Yunior Francisco Gomez | 11 May 1999 (aged 19) | |
| 6 | DF | Steven Gomez | 5 May 2000 (aged 18) | (Dominican Football Federation) C.A. San Cristóbal |
| 7 | DF | Victor Skarith Taveras Reynoso | 29 May 2000 (aged 18) | |
| 8 | MF | Gerard Lavergne | 25 January 1999 (aged 19) | (Dominican Football Federation) Cibao FC |
| 9 | FW | Erick Japa | 6 August 1999 (aged 19) | (Panamanian Football Federation) Independiente Chorrera |
| 10 | FW | Ronaldo Vásquez | 30 June 1999 (aged 19) | (Dominican Football Federation) Atlético Pantoja |
| 11 | MF | Juan Ángeles | 16 October 2000 (aged 18) | (Dominican Football Federation) Moca FC |
| 12 | MF | Sergio Paredes | 5 August 2000 (aged 18) | |
| 13 | MF | Daniel Daniel Leonardo Flores | 11 November 2000 (aged 17) | |
| 14 | FW | Juan Carlos Pineda Torres | 12 January 2000 (aged 18) | (Royal Spanish Football Federation) Getafe CF B |
| 15 | MF | Hugo Martinez Castillo | 19 November 2000 (aged 17) | |
| 16 | MF | Julio Sanchez | 28 October 1999 (aged 19) | (Dominican Football Federation) Moca FC |
| 17 | FW | Alberto Francisco Medina Perez | 18 July 2000 (aged 18) | |
| 18 | DF | Ernesto Armenteros Capano | 30 June 1999 (aged 19) | |
| 19 | DF | Erick Manuel Pacheco Matos | 13 November 1999 (aged 18) | |
| 20 | GK | Danilo Daniel Campana | 2 July 1999 (aged 19) | (Dominican Football Federation) Atlántico FC |

=== Honduras ===
Head coach: (Honduras) Carlos Tábora

| No. | Pos. | Player | Date of birth (age) | Club |
|---|---|---|---|---|
| 1 | GK | José García | 28 February 2000 (aged 18) | (National Autonomous Federation of Football of Honduras) Real España |
| 2 | DF | Elison Rivas | 20 November 1999 (aged 18) | (National Autonomous Federation of Football of Honduras) Real España |
| 3 | DF | Darwin Diego | 14 July 1999 (aged 19) | (National Autonomous Federation of Football of Honduras) Vida |
| 4 | DF | Axel Gómez | 28 June 2000 (aged 18) | (National Autonomous Federation of Football of Honduras) Olimpia |
| 5 | DF | Wesly Decas | 11 August 1999 (aged 19) | (Portuguese Football Federation) Nacional |
| 6 | MF | Éverson López | 3 November 2000 (aged 17) | (National Autonomous Federation of Football of Honduras) Motagua |
| 7 | MF | Cristian Cálix | 9 September 1999 (aged 19) | (National Autonomous Federation of Football of Honduras) Marathón |
| 8 | MF | (substituted off) Edwin Rodríguez | 25 September 1999 (aged 19) | (National Autonomous Federation of Football of Honduras) Olimpia |
| 9 | FW | César Romero | 19 January 1999 (aged 19) | (National Autonomous Federation of Football of Honduras) Motagua |
| 10 | MF | Carlos Mejía | 19 February 2000 (aged 18) | (National Autonomous Federation of Football of Honduras) Vida |
| 11 | FW | Josué Villafranca | 16 December 1999 (aged 18) | (National Autonomous Federation of Football of Honduras) Motagua |
| 12 | GK | Óscar Reyes | 31 January 1999 (aged 19) | (National Autonomous Federation of Football of Honduras) Vida |
| 13 | MF | Selvin Guevara | 15 February 1999 (aged 19) | (National Autonomous Federation of Football of Honduras) Real España |
| 14 | FW | Mikel Santos | 27 April 1999 (aged 19) | (National Autonomous Federation of Football of Honduras) Marathón |
| 15 | DF | Cristian Moreira | 21 May 2000 (aged 18) | (Costa Rican Football Federation) Municipal Grecia |
| 16 | MF | Jack Baptiste | 20 December 1999 (aged 18) | (National Autonomous Federation of Football of Honduras) Motagua |
| 17 | MF | Luis Palma | 17 January 2000 (aged 18) | (National Autonomous Federation of Football of Honduras) Vida |
| 18 | DF | Jonathan Núñez | 26 November 2001 (aged 16) | (National Autonomous Federation of Football of Honduras) Motagua |
| 19 | DF | Mariano Álvarez | 2 May 1999 (aged 19) | (National Autonomous Federation of Football of Honduras) Real España |
| 20 | MF | Gerson Chávez | 31 January 2000 (aged 18) | (National Autonomous Federation of Football of Honduras) Real España |

Replacements:

| No. | Pos. | Player | Date of birth (age) | Club |
|---|---|---|---|---|
| 23 | FW | (substituted on) Patrick Palacios | 29 January 2000 (aged 18) | |

=== Sint Maarten ===
Head coach: Elvis Albertus

| No. | Pos. | Player | Date of birth (age) | Club |
|---|---|---|---|---|
| 1 | GK | Jariel Gabriel | 10 April 2001 (aged 17) | (Sint Maarten Football Federation) Reggae Lions |
| 2 | DF | Diaro Forsythe | 11 January 2001 (aged 17) | (Sint Maarten Football Federation) FC Soualiga |
| 3 | DF | Daniel Lange | 5 December 2000 (aged 17) | |
| 4 | DF | Kerese Bazil | 12 November 2001 (aged 16) | (Sint Maarten Football Federation) FC Soualiga |
| 5 | MF | Rajaan Prince | 25 August 2001 (aged 17) | (Sint Maarten Football Federation) Flames United SC |
| 6 | MF | Kael Richards | 13 February 2000 (aged 18) | (Sint Maarten Football Federation) Funmakers FC |
| 7 | FW | Stanlei Ferdinand | 18 February 1999 (aged 19) | |
| 8 | DF | Andre Knol | 20 September 2000 (aged 18) | (Sint Maarten Football Federation) Funmakers FC |
| 9 | FW | Jaeremi Drijvers | 12 November 1999 (aged 18) | (Sint Maarten Football Federation) Funmakers FC |
| 10 | MF | Jean Craane | 17 July 2003 (aged 15) | (Sint Maarten Football Federation) FC Soualiga |
| 11 | FW | Leonidas Zion | 28 September 1999 (aged 19) | |
| 12 | DF | Khajeel Bailey | 22 September 2000 (aged 18) | |
| 13 | DF | Jolian Peterson | 3 May 2003 (aged 15) | |
| 14 | MF | Juan Pablo Trejos Vallejo | 29 June 2001 (aged 17) | |
| 15 | DF | Javier Wadilie | 5 March 2002 (aged 16) | |
| 16 | MF | Engelhardt Sjean-Dee | 5 February 1999 (aged 19) | |
| 17 | DF | Terrence Pinas | 22 March 1999 (aged 19) | |
| 18 | MF | Michele Palella | 3 July 2002 (aged 16) | |
| 19 | DF | Naeco Drijvers | 16 August 1999 (aged 19) | |
| 20 | GK | Cartalino Joseph | 22 April 2002 (aged 16) | |

== Group D ==
=== Canada ===
Head coach: (Canada) Andrew Olivieri

| No. | Pos. | Player | Date of birth (age) | Club |
|---|---|---|---|---|
| 1 | GK | Alessandro Busti | June 30, 2000 (age 26) | (Italian Football Federation) Juventus U23 |
| 2 | DF | Émile Legault | April 10, 2000 (age 26) | Unattached |
| 3 | DF | Daniel Kinumbe | March 15, 1999 (age 27) | (Canadian Soccer Association) Montreal Impact |
| 4 | MF | Michael Baldisimo | April 13, 2000 (age 26) | (Canadian Soccer Association) Vancouver Whitecaps FC |
| 5 | DF | Julian Dunn-Johnson | July 11, 2000 (age 26) | (Canadian Soccer Association) Toronto FC |
| 6 | MF | Yohan Le Bourhis | March 9, 2000 (age 26) | (Canadian Soccer Association) Montreal Impact Academy |
| 7 | MF | Clément Bayiha | March 8, 1999 (age 27) | (Canadian Soccer Association) Montreal Impact |
| 8 | MF | Noble Okello | July 20, 2000 (age 26) | (Canadian Soccer Association) Toronto FC II |
| 9 | FW | Theo Bair | August 27, 1999 (age 27) | (Canadian Soccer Association) Vancouver Whitecaps FC |
| 10 | MF | Mathieu Choinière | February 7, 1999 (age 27) | (Canadian Soccer Association) Montreal Impact |
| 11 | MF | Noah Verhoeven | June 15, 1999 (age 27) | (United States Soccer Federation) Fresno FC |
| 12 | MF | Dante Campbell | May 22, 1999 (age 27) | (Canadian Soccer Association) Toronto FC II |
| 13 | DF | Terique Mohammed | January 27, 2000 (age 26) | (Canadian Soccer Association) Toronto FC II |
| 14 | MF | Benson Fazili | January 12, 2000 (age 26) | (Latvian Football Federation) FK Metta |
| 15 | FW | José Hernández | March 19, 2000 (age 26) | (Canadian Soccer Association) Vancouver Whitecaps FC Academy |
| 16 | DF | Rocco Romeo | March 25, 2000 (age 26) | (Canadian Soccer Association) Toronto FC II |
| 17 | FW | Adonijah Reid | August 13, 1999 (age 27) | (United States Soccer Federation) FC Dallas |
| 18 | GK | Thomas Hasal | July 9, 1999 (age 27) | (Canadian Soccer Association) Vancouver Whitecaps FC Academy |
| 19 | FW | Jordan Perruzza | January 16, 2001 (age 25) | (Canadian Soccer Association) Toronto FC II |
| 20 | MF | Steffen Yeates | January 4, 2000 (age 26) | (United States Soccer Federation) Connecticut Huskies |

=== Dominica ===
Head coach: Rajesh Latchoo

| No. | Pos. | Player | Date of birth (age) | Club |
|---|---|---|---|---|
| 1 | GK | Tafari Stanley Elie | 16 December 1999 (aged 18) | |
| 2 | DF | Perry Donald Charles | 2 November 2000 (aged 17) | (Dominica Football Association) Point Michel FC |
| 3 | DF | Anton Nash Francis | 11 October 1999 (aged 19) | |
| 4 | DF | Zion Jagna Emanuel | 12 January 2001 (aged 17) | (Dominica Football Association) Harlem United FC |
| 5 | DF | Richmond Pierre Louis | 9 September 2001 (aged 17) | |
| 6 | MF | Kiano Nigel Martin | 9 August 2000 (aged 18) | (Dominica Football Association) Mahaut Soca Strikers |
| 7 | MF | Reon Cuffy | 17 January 1999 (aged 19) | (Dominica Football Association) East Central FC |
| 8 | MF | Marcelus Shane Bonney | 16 February 2000 (aged 18) | (Dominica Football Association) Bath Estate FC |
| 9 | FW | Jamie Parillon | 10 December 1999 (aged 18) | (Dominica Football Association) Portsmouth Bombers FC |
| 10 | MF | Fitz Jolly | 16 March 1999 (aged 19) | (Dominica Football Association) Harlem United FC |
| 11 | FW | Audel Josiah O Neal Laville | 14 September 2002 (aged 16) | (Dominica Football Association) Harlem United FC |
| 12 | GK | Donte Leon Newton | 17 February 1999 (aged 19) | (Dominica Football Association) Sagicor South East United |
| 13 | DF | John Edward Jr Gregoire | 2 October 2000 (aged 18) | |
| 14 | MF | Eustace Jnr Phillip | 3 January 2000 (aged 18) | (Dominica Football Association) Bath Estate FC |
| 15 | DF | Robert Jarvis Gormonstone Humphreys | 8 December 2000 (aged 17) | |
| 16 | DF | Jervanie Kaleb Xavier | 18 October 2000 (aged 18) | (Dominica Football Association) Dublanc FC |
| 17 | FW | Lemar Tervin Walsh Irish | 21 September 2000 (aged 18) | (Dominica Football Association) Portsmouth Bombers FC |
| 18 | MF | Yannick Dominica Burkard | 28 May 1999 (aged 19) | (Dominica Football Association) Portsmouth Bombers FC |
| 19 | FW | Zion Tristan Lander | 17 June 1999 (aged 19) | |
| 20 | FW | Yhaddi Ian Reid | 3 February 2001 (aged 17) | (Dominica Football Association) Tarish FC |

=== Guadeloupe ===
Head coach: Moïse Castry

| No. | Pos. | Player | Date of birth (age) | Club |
|---|---|---|---|---|
| 1 | GK | Erwan Regulus | 15 May 2000 (aged 18) | |
| 2 | DF | François Xavier Gustave Dit Duflo | 9 November 2000 (aged 17) | (Ligue guadeloupéenne de football) La Gauloise de Basse-Terre |
| 3 | DF | Yannis Valcy | 6 August 1999 (aged 19) | (Ligue guadeloupéenne de football) L'Etoile de Morne-à-l'Eau |
| 4 | MF | Reeud Manin | 8 September 2001 (aged 17) | |
| 5 | MF | Ayann Citadelle | 9 April 2000 (aged 18) | (Ligue guadeloupéenne de football) US Baie-Mahault |
| 6 | FW | Jairzhino Fumont | 6 February 2000 (aged 18) | (French Football Federation) Ol.Lyon |
| 7 | FW | Mendy Chadru | 11 July 1999 (aged 19) | (Ligue guadeloupéenne de football) US Baie-Mahault |
| 8 | DF | Audric Lionel Girondin | 5 October 2001 (aged 17) | (French Football Federation) AS Béziers Hérault |
| 9 | FW | Luther Archimèd | 17 September 1999 (aged 19) | (French Football Federation) Sochaux |
| 10 | FW | Benoit Gedeon | 23 January 1999 (aged 19) | (Ligue guadeloupéenne de football) Racing Club de Basse-Terre |
| 11 | FW | Edrick Virginie-Jovial | 13 March 1999 (aged 19) | (French Football Federation) US Alençon |
| 12 | DF | Mathieu Luce | 11 January 2001 (aged 17) | (French Football Federation) Clermont Foot |
| 13 | MF | Yannick Saint Geraud | 29 April 2000 (aged 18) | (Ligue guadeloupéenne de football) JS Vieux-Habitants |
| 14 | MF | Yanis Clotail | 27 July 1999 (aged 19) | |
| 15 | DF | Joaquim Carbel | 20 February 1999 (aged 19) | (Ligue guadeloupéenne de football) US Baie-Mahault |
| 16 | GK | Mathieu Philemon | 5 July 1999 (aged 19) | (Ligue guadeloupéenne de football) Siroco Abymes |
| 17 | FW | Dylan Laug | 19 October 1999 (aged 19) | |
| 18 | MF | Mathis Bapaume | 17 October 2001 (aged 17) | (French Football Federation) AS Béziers Hérault |
| 19 | DF | Kenjy Montantin | 20 February 2001 (aged 17) | |
| 20 | FW | Jordinaël Eglela | 11 November 1999 (aged 18) | (Ligue guadeloupéenne de football) Phare Petit-Canal |

=== Martinique ===
Head coach: Julien Certain

| No. | Pos. | Player | Date of birth (age) | Club |
|---|---|---|---|---|
| 1 | GK | Aldrick William Antony Boulois | 5 October 2001 (aged 17) | (Ligue de football de la Martinique) CS Case-Pilote |
| 2 | DF | Andy Paulin | 20 November 1999 (aged 18) | (Ligue de football de la Martinique) Aiglon |
| 3 | DF | Lucas Ardennes | 25 January 2001 (aged 17) | |
| 4 | DF | Andy Cizo | 2 March 2000 (aged 18) | (French Football Federation) ASM Belfort |
| 5 | DF | Jean-Claude Michalet | 8 April 2000 (aged 18) | |
| 6 | MF | Jeremy Bellune | 16 June 1999 (aged 19) | (French Football Federation) Chamois Niortais F.C. |
| 7 | FW | Alan Henri Etile | 13 December 2000 (aged 17) | |
| 8 | MF | Carlo Rabathaly | 16 April 2000 (aged 18) | |
| 9 | FW | Axel Raphael | 14 February 1999 (aged 19) | (French Football Federation) SC Bastia |
| 10 | FW | Bryan Henriol | 5 May 1999 (aged 19) | |
| 11 | FW | Alvin Lamasine | 7 July 2001 (aged 17) | (Ligue de football de la Martinique) Golden Lion FC |
| 12 | DF | Emeric Pastel | 29 January 2001 (aged 17) | |
| 13 | FW | Thomas Boror | 15 October 2000 (aged 18) | |
| 14 | DF | Florian Goma | 21 January 2001 (aged 17) | |
| 15 | MF | Lilian Lebielle | 17 February 2000 (aged 18) | |
| 16 | GK | Lemuel Xavier | 11 March 2000 (aged 18) | |
| 17 | FW | Alessandro Loetitia | 13 March 2000 (aged 18) | (French Football Federation) Clermont Foot |
| 18 | MF | Yohan Debs | 1 December 1999 (aged 18) | |
| 19 | FW | William Marie-Magdelaine | 27 November 1999 (aged 18) | (Ligue de football de la Martinique) RC Rivière-Pilote |
| 20 | MF | Hugo Pierre Couty | 2 October 1999 (aged 19) | |

=== Panama ===
Head coach: Julio Dely Valdés

| No. | Pos. | Player | Date of birth (age) | Club |
|---|---|---|---|---|
| 1 | GK | Marcos Allen | 8 February 1999 (aged 19) | (Panamanian Football Federation) C.D. Plaza Amador |
| 2 | DF | Jesús West | 19 June 1999 (aged 19) | |
| 3 | DF | Guillermo Benitez | 5 March 1999 (aged 19) | (Panamanian Football Federation) C.D. Plaza Amador |
| 4 | DF | Manuel Antonio Gamboa | 5 February 1999 (aged 19) | (Panamanian Football Federation) Chorrillo FC |
| 5 | DF | Carlos Harvey | 3 February 2000 (aged 18) | (Panamanian Football Federation) Tauro F.C. |
| 6 | MF | Ernesto Walker | 9 February 1999 (aged 19) | |
| 7 | FW | Saed Díaz | 23 June 1999 (aged 19) | |
| 8 | MF | Victor Griffith | 12 December 2000 (aged 17) | (Panamanian Football Federation) Tauro F.C. |
| 9 | FW | Jose Macias | 22 September 1999 (aged 19) | |
| 10 | MF | Ángel Orelien | 2 April 2001 (aged 17) | (Panamanian Football Federation) Sporting San Miguelito |
| 11 | DF | Jorge Mendez | 6 April 2001 (aged 17) | (Panamanian Football Federation) Chorrillo FC |
| 12 | GK | Emerson Eliezer Dimas Vasquez | 10 August 2001 (aged 17) | |
| 13 | MF | Carlos Kirton | 2 August 1999 (aged 19) | (Panamanian Football Federation) Independiente F.C. |
| 14 | DF | Rodolfo Rodriguez De Los Rios | 18 March 1999 (aged 19) | |
| 15 | MF | Diego Valanta | 8 September 2000 (aged 18) | (Panamanian Football Federation) Tauro F.C. |
| 16 | FW | (substituted off) Tomas Rodriguez | 9 March 1999 (aged 19) | (Panamanian Football Federation) Alianza Panama |
| 17 | DF | Soyell Isiah Trejos Tesis | 19 April 2000 (aged 18) | |
| 18 | FW | Axel McKenzie | 10 July 1999 (aged 19) | |
| 19 | MF | Maikell Díaz | 16 February 2000 (aged 18) | (Panamanian Football Federation) Alianza Panama |
| 20 | DF | Edgar Cunningham | 2 October 2000 (aged 18) | (Panamanian Football Federation) C.D. Árabe Unido |

Replacements:

| No. | Pos. | Player | Date of birth (age) | Club |
|---|---|---|---|---|
| 25 | FW | (substituted on) Angel Valverde | 2 April 1999 (aged 19) | |

=== Saint Kitts and Nevis ===
Head coach: St.clair Morris

| No. | Pos. | Player | Date of birth (age) | Club |
|---|---|---|---|---|
| 1 | GK | Zian Drew | 11 February 2002 (aged 16) | |
| 2 | DF | Brandon Chaderton | 5 October 2001 (aged 17) | |
| 3 | DF | Mickel Hirst | 27 July 2000 (aged 18) | |
| 4 | DF | Esquick Nicholls | 13 September 1999 (aged 19) | |
| 5 | DF | Victor Flemming | 1 January 1999 (aged 19) | |
| 6 | DF | Dijhorn Simmonds | 10 September 1999 (aged 19) | |
| 7 | FW | Tiquanny Williams | 10 September 2001 (aged 17) | |
| 8 | MF | Ethan Nelson | 1 August 2001 (aged 17) | |
| 9 | FW | Romario Martin | 30 August 1999 (aged 19) | (The Football Association) Solihull Moors F.C. |
| 10 | FW | Tyrese Shade | 9 June 2000 (aged 18) | |
| 11 | MF | Javern Matthew | 25 March 2001 (aged 17) | |
| 12 | FW | Naseem Thompson | 10 October 1999 (aged 19) | |
| 13 | MF | Javaughn Brookes | 1 December 2000 (aged 17) | |
| 14 | MF | Jason Jeffers | 27 April 1999 (aged 19) | |
| 15 | MF | Mervin Lewis | 26 August 2000 (aged 18) | |
| 16 | DF | Malique Roberts | 1 August 2001 (aged 17) | |
| 17 | DF | Ethan Bristow | 27 November 2001 (aged 16) | (The Football Association) Reading F.C. |
| 18 | GK | Zaykeese Smith | 24 February 2000 (aged 18) | |
| 19 | MF | Kejaune David | 6 October 1999 (aged 19) | |
| 20 | MF | Ranier Richardson | 13 February 2001 (aged 17) | |

== Group E ==
=== Barbados ===
Head coach: Kenville Layne

| No. | Pos. | Player | Date of birth (age) | Club |
|---|---|---|---|---|
| 1 | GK | Liam Brathwaite | 6 November 2000 (aged 17) | |
| 2 | DF | Kaeson Trench | 16 January 2000 (aged 18) | |
| 3 | DF | Rashawn Kellman | 2 November 1999 (aged 18) | |
| 4 | DF | Yannick Blackman | 25 October 1999 (aged 19) | |
| 5 | DF | Shakeel Browne | 19 February 1999 (aged 19) | |
| 6 | DF | Tyrique Holder | 15 September 1999 (aged 19) | |
| 7 | MF | Ackeel Applewhaite | 17 July 1999 (aged 19) | |
| 8 | MF | Sheran Hoyte | 21 February 2000 (aged 18) | |
| 9 | MF | Elijah Downey | 17 March 1999 (aged 19) | |
| 10 | MF | Antone Greaves | 4 December 1999 (aged 18) | |
| 11 | MF | Ray Francis | 23 March 2000 (aged 18) | |
| 12 | FW | Dishon Howell | 12 July 2001 (aged 17) | |
| 13 | MF | Roshon Gittens | 5 February 2002 (aged 16) | |
| 14 | DF | Shaquanie Phillips | 17 July 2002 (aged 16) | |
| 15 | MF | Ranaldo Trim | 29 January 1999 (aged 19) | |
| 16 | FW | Donte Greenidge | 27 December 2001 (aged 16) | |
| 17 | FW | Thierry Gale | 1 May 2002 (aged 16) | (Barbados Football Association) Pro Shottas United |
| 18 | MF | Niall Reid-Stephen | 8 September 2001 (aged 17) | |
| 19 | DF | Andre Applewhaite | 3 June 2002 (aged 16) | |
| 20 | GK | Nashton Browne | 12 April 2001 (aged 17) | |

=== Bermuda ===
Head coach: Ray Jones

| No. | Pos. | Player | Date of birth (age) | Club |
|---|---|---|---|---|
| 1 | GK | Quinaceo Hunt | 21 January 2000 (aged 18) | (Bermuda Football Association) PHC Zebras |
| 2 | MF | Aaron Spencer | 30 October 1999 (aged 19) | |
| 3 | DF | Mical Hardtman | 20 November 2000 (aged 17) | |
| 4 | DF | Edry Moore | 28 March 2000 (aged 18) | |
| 5 | DF | Link Smith Jr | 5 July 2000 (aged 18) | |
| 6 | DF | Jorj Dublin | 10 August 1999 (aged 19) | |
| 7 | MF | Knory Scott | 6 June 1999 (aged 19) | (Bermuda Football Association) North Village Rams |
| 8 | MF | Diego Richardson | 31 July 2001 (aged 17) | |
| 9 | FW | D’Andre Wainwright | 1 January 2000 (aged 18) | |
| 10 | FW | Rahzir Smith-Jones | 1 November 2000 (aged 18) | |
| 11 | MF | Jahkari Furbert | 6 March 1999 (aged 19) | |
| 12 | GK | Yizhariyah Williams | 5 January 2001 (aged 17) | |
| 13 | FW | T'Ai Williams | 31 January 2000 (aged 18) | |
| 14 | FW | Aaron Burgess | 9 March 1999 (aged 19) | |
| 15 | DF | Stanley Mcdowall Jr. | 22 March 2000 (aged 18) | |
| 16 | MF | Cory Booth | 27 July 2000 (aged 18) | |
| 17 | MF | Jenico Sealey | 14 April 2001 (aged 17) | |
| 18 | DF | San-Tze Burgess | 23 February 2000 (aged 18) | |
| 19 | MF | Zuhri Burgess | 16 March 2000 (aged 18) | (Bermuda Football Association) Robin Hood F.C. |
| 20 | DF | Nizigh Spence | 5 December 2001 (aged 16) | |

=== Costa Rica ===
Head coach: (Costa Rica) Breansse Camacho

| No. | Pos. | Player | Date of birth (age) | Club |
|---|---|---|---|---|
| 1 | GK | Kevin Chamorro | April 8, 2000 (age 26) | (Costa Rican Football Federation) A.D. Carmelita |
| 2 | GK | Patrick Sequeira | March 1, 1999 (age 27) | (Royal Spanish Football Federation) Real Unión |
| 3 | DF | Diego Mesén | March 28, 1999 (age 27) | (Costa Rican Football Federation) Santos de Guápiles F.C. |
| 4 | DF | Alexis Gamboa | March 20, 1999 (age 27) | (Royal Belgian Football Association) Waasland-Beveren |
| 5 | DF | Fernan Faerrón | August 22, 2000 (age 26) | (Austrian Football Association) LASK Linz |
| 6 | DF | Orlando Galo | August 11, 2000 (age 26) | (Costa Rican Football Federation) Alajuelense |
| 7 | DF | Carlos Martinez | March 30, 1999 (age 27) | (Royal Belgian Football Association) KAS Eupen |
| 8 | DF | Walter Cortés | February 5, 2000 (age 26) | (Costa Rican Football Federation) Saprissa |
| 9 | MF | Sebastian Castro | August 16, 2000 (age 26) | (Costa Rican Football Federation) A.D. Carmelita |
| 10 | MF | Amferny Arias | January 15, 2000 (age 26) | (Costa Rican Football Federation) Alajuelense |
| 11 | MF | Greivin Fonseca | September 7, 2000 (age 26) | (Costa Rican Football Federation) Saprissa |
| 12 | MF | Joshua Navarro | March 11, 1999 (age 27) | (Costa Rican Football Federation) Perez Zeledon |
| 13 | MF | Yecsy Jarquín | May 22, 2000 (age 26) | (Costa Rican Football Federation) Herediano |
| 14 | MF | Josué Abarca | January 4, 2000 (age 26) | (Mexican Football Federation) Santos Laguna |
| 15 | MF | Ronaldo Araya | August 3, 1999 (age 27) | (Costa Rican Football Federation) Cartagines |
| 16 | MF | Carlos Villegas | March 3, 1999 (age 27) | (Costa Rican Football Federation) Saprissa |
| 17 | MF | Rashir Parkins | February 23, 2001 (age 25) | (Costa Rican Football Federation) Limon FC |
| 18 | FW | Andrés Gómez | May 7, 2000 (age 26) | (Costa Rican Football Federation) Guadalupe F.C. |
| 19 | FW | Jurguens Montenegro | December 13, 2000 (age 25) | (Costa Rican Football Federation) Alajuelense |
| 20 | FW | Andy Reyes | April 6, 1999 (age 27) | (Austrian Football Association) LASK Linz |

=== Haiti ===
Head coach: Marc Collat

| No. | Pos. | Player | Date of birth (age) | Club |
|---|---|---|---|---|
| 1 | GK | Josué Duverger | 27 April 2000 (aged 18) | (Portuguese Football Federation) Vitoria F.C. |
| 2 | DF | Makentoche Santos Fede | 22 April 1999 (aged 19) | (Haitian Football Federation) AS Mirebalais |
| 3 | DF | Brismax Louis Kelly Clerger | 5 January 2000 (aged 18) | (Haitian Football Federation) Don Bosco FC |
| 4 | DF | Peterson Pierre Louis | 13 June 2001 (aged 17) | (Haitian Football Federation) Don Bosco FC |
| 5 | MF | Bicou Bissainthe | 15 March 1999 (aged 19) | (Haitian Football Federation) Real Hope FA |
| 6 | DF | Herve Joseph | 30 December 2000 (aged 17) | (Haitian Football Federation) Don Bosco FC |
| 7 | MF | Keny Atirson Charleston | 22 October 1999 (aged 19) | (Haitian Football Federation) AS Mirebalais |
| 8 | MF | Dutherson Clerveaux | 20 January 1999 (aged 19) | (Haitian Football Federation) AS Cavaly |
| 9 | FW | Ronaldo Damus | 12 September 1999 (aged 19) | (Haitian Football Federation) Real Hope FA |
| 10 | FW | Steeve Selso Saint-Duc | 8 January 2000 (aged 18) | (United States Soccer Federation) Los Angeles FC |
| 11 | MF | Fredler Christophe | 14 January 2002 (aged 16) | (Haitian Football Federation) Exafoot |
| 12 | GK | Davensley Benoit | 9 November 1999 (aged 18) | (Haitian Football Federation) Don Bosco FC |
| 13 | DF | Delentz Pierre | 16 September 2000 (aged 18) | (United States Soccer Federation) Real Monarchs |
| 14 | MF | Danley Jean Jacques | 20 May 2000 (aged 18) | (Haitian Football Federation) Don Bosco FC |
| 15 | MF | Dany Jean | 28 November 2002 (aged 15) | (Haitian Football Federation) Aigle Noir AC |
| 16 | MF | Valdo Etienne | 11 May 2000 (aged 18) | (Haitian Football Federation) Real Hope FA |
| 17 | DF | Francois Andre Dulysse | 13 April 1999 (aged 19) | (United States Soccer Federation) Portland Timbers |
| 18 | FW | Antonio Borgelin | 19 October 2001 (aged 17) | (United States Soccer Federation) Philadelphia Union |
| 19 | FW | Naël Élysée | 28 May 2001 (aged 17) | (Haitian Football Federation) Don Bosco FC |
| 20 | FW | McJeffrey Pierre | 16 October 1999 (aged 19) | (Portuguese Football Federation) Mem Martins |

=== Saint Lucia ===
Head coach: Francis Lastic

| No. | Pos. | Player | Date of birth (age) | Club |
|---|---|---|---|---|
| 1 | GK | Vino Barclett | 12 October 1999 (aged 19) | (Trinidad and Tobago Football Association) Caledonia AIA |
| 2 | DF | Dillon Fannis | 21 January 2000 (aged 18) | |
| 3 | DF | Josh Davis | 20 November 1999 (aged 18) | |
| 4 | DF | Hakeem Harrow | 19 December 2000 (aged 17) | |
| 5 | MF | Oneil Edward | 13 November 1999 (aged 18) | |
| 6 | DF | Sebastin Ribot | 12 February 2000 (aged 18) | |
| 7 | FW | Al Charles | 15 April 1999 (aged 19) | |
| 8 | MF | Julius Lansiquot | 6 November 1999 (aged 18) | (The Football Association) Barnet F.C. |
| 9 | FW | Aaron Richard | 10 February 1999 (aged 19) | (United States Soccer Federation) USC Aiken Pacers |
| 10 | DF | Djal Augustin | 17 December 2000 (aged 17) | |
| 11 | FW | Daniel Biscette | 11 October 2000 (aged 18) | |
| 12 | DF | George Louis | 25 September 1999 (aged 19) | |
| 13 | MF | Bryant Polius | 14 March 2001 (aged 17) | |
| 14 | FW | Nangee Philip | 1 July 1999 (aged 19) | |
| 15 | FW | Zane Amedee | 21 December 1999 (aged 18) | |
| 16 | GK | Zanzibar Reynolds | 3 May 1999 (aged 19) | |
| 17 | MF | Ectus David | 30 July 1999 (aged 19) | |
| 18 | MF | Raphael Joseph | 3 August 2000 (aged 18) | |
| 19 | DF | Jervel Tobierre | 31 March 1999 (aged 19) | (United States Soccer Federation) USC Aiken Pacers |
| 20 | MF | Troy Edward | 23 September 2000 (aged 18) | |

== Group F ==
=== Cayman Islands ===
Head coach: Ernie Seymour

| No. | Pos. | Player | Date of birth (age) | Club |
|---|---|---|---|---|
| 1 | GK | Albertini Holness | 6 March 2000 (aged 18) | |
| 2 | DF | Kailan Miller | 7 October 2000 (aged 18) | |
| 3 | DF | Ackeem Hyde | 3 November 1999 (aged 18) | |
| 4 | MF | Jah Dain Alexander | 8 December 1999 (aged 18) | |
| 5 | DF | Jah Dean Alexander | 8 December 1999 (aged 18) | |
| 6 | MF | D'Andre Rowe | 5 January 2001 (aged 17) | |
| 7 | MF | Alexander Clarke-Ramirez | 27 June 2001 (aged 17) | |
| 8 | MF | Kareem Foster | 6 September 2000 (aged 18) | |
| 9 | FW | Kray Foster | 2 November 1999 (aged 18) | |
| 10 | FW | Leighton Thomas | 13 February 1999 (aged 19) | |
| 11 | MF | Kameron Mendez | 9 February 2001 (aged 17) | |
| 12 | GK | Jayden Downey | 11 April 2000 (aged 18) | |
| 13 | MF | Corey Mellaneo | 20 January 2000 (aged 18) | |
| 14 | DF | Rohelio Wright | 25 July 2001 (aged 17) | |
| 15 | MF | Kion Parchmont | 28 January 2000 (aged 18) | (Cayman Islands Football Association) Academy SC |
| 16 | DF | Eric Wilson | 1 May 1999 (aged 19) | |
| 17 | MF | Mason Duval | 24 August 2001 (aged 17) | |
| 18 | FW | Trey Ebanks | 5 June 2000 (aged 18) | (Cayman Islands Football Association) Academy SC |
| 19 | DF | Jabari Campbell | 23 June 2000 (aged 18) | (Cayman Islands Football Association) Academy SC |
| 20 | DF | Ian Kirkwood Rubi | 30 October 2000 (aged 18) | |

=== Curaçao ===
Head coach: Ludwig Alberto

| No. | Pos. | Player | Date of birth (age) | Club |
|---|---|---|---|---|
| 1 | GK | Kevin Juliana | 2 October 2000 (aged 18) | |
| 2 | DF | Danel Rosa | 28 January 2000 (aged 18) | (Curaçao Football Federation) CSD Barber |
| 3 | DF | Quinton Burk | 17 June 2000 (aged 18) | (Curaçao Football Federation) CRKSV Jong Holland |
| 4 | DF | Ayodele Kwidama | 9 March 2000 (aged 18) | |
| 5 | DF | Dion Hooi | 10 August 2000 (aged 18) | (Royal Dutch Football Association) Sparta Rotterdam |
| 6 | MF | Roderick Bolijn | 9 March 2000 (aged 18) | (Curaçao Football Federation) CSD Barber |
| 7 | FW | Giorney Rojer | 1 January 2000 (aged 18) | (Royal Dutch Football Association) FC Emmen |
| 8 | FW | Jonathan Libania | 8 May 2001 (aged 17) | (Curaçao Football Federation) S.V. Victory Boys |
| 9 | FW | Meghon Valpoort | 31 July 2000 (aged 18) | (Royal Dutch Football Association) Almere City FC |
| 10 | MF | Jaron Vicario | 16 August 1999 (aged 19) | (Royal Dutch Football Association) Feyenoord |
| 11 | FW | Quincy Does | 17 September 2000 (aged 18) | (Royal Dutch Football Association) ADO Den Haag |
| 12 | DF | Sugenly Martha | 21 October 2000 (aged 18) | (Curaçao Football Federation) CRKSV Jong Colombia |
| 13 | MF | Luchenthly Vrutaal | 17 May 2001 (aged 17) | (Curaçao Football Federation) UNDEBA |
| 14 | FW | Sharrion Pietersz | 6 July 2001 (aged 17) | |
| 15 | MF | Rogyear Anita | 12 September 1999 (aged 19) | |
| 16 | FW | Gianni Vandepitte | 3 July 2000 (aged 18) | (Royal Dutch Football Association) NAC Breda |
| 17 | MF | Nixon Buntin | 13 July 1999 (aged 19) | |
| 18 | MF | Quintin Rustveld | 6 January 2001 (aged 17) | (Royal Dutch Football Association) ADO Den Haag |
| 19 | FW | Carlito Fermina | 23 January 2000 (aged 18) | (Royal Dutch Football Association) S.B.V. Excelsior |
| 20 | GK | William Plaate | 27 May 1999 (aged 19) | (Curaçao Football Federation) C.V.V. Inter Willemstad |

=== El Salvador ===
Head coach: Ernesto Góchez

| No. | Pos. | Player | Date of birth (age) | Club |
|---|---|---|---|---|
| 1 | GK | Rodrigo Artiga | 30 June 1999 (aged 19) | (Salvadoran Football Federation) C.D. Sonsonate |
| 2 | DF | Kevin Menjivar | 23 September 2000 (aged 18) | (Salvadoran Football Federation) Turín FESA F.C. |
| 3 | DF | Siliazar Henríquez | 1 February 1999 (aged 19) | (Salvadoran Football Federation) Turín FESA F.C. |
| 4 | DF | Jorge Cruz | 24 January 2000 (aged 18) | (Salvadoran Football Federation) Once Lobos |
| 5 | DF | William Pinto | 25 July 2000 (aged 18) | (Salvadoran Football Federation) C.D. Atlético Marte |
| 6 | MF | José Portillo | 14 November 1999 (aged 18) | (Salvadoran Football Federation) Alianza F.C. |
| 7 | MF | Angel Callejas | 14 January 1999 (aged 19) | (Salvadoran Football Federation) Santa Tecla F.C. |
| 8 | MF | Rodrigo Santamaria | 9 February 2000 (aged 18) | (Salvadoran Football Federation) C.D. FAS |
| 9 | FW | (substituted off) Gerson Sánchez | 19 June 1999 (aged 19) | (Salvadoran Football Federation) Santa Tecla F.C. |
| 10 | FW | Josue Rivera | 9 March 1999 (aged 19) | (Salvadoran Football Federation) C.D. FAS |
| 11 | FW | Alexis Cerritos | 2 October 2000 (aged 18) | (United States Soccer Federation) D.C. United |
| 12 | MF | Sebastien Rondeau | 19 January 2000 (aged 18) | (Salvadoran Football Federation) C.D. Sonsonate |
| 13 | MF | Eric Junior Garcia Cruz | 16 October 1999 (aged 19) | |
| 14 | MF | Andres Gonzalez | 25 October 1999 (aged 19) | (Salvadoran Football Federation) Turín FESA F.C. |
| 15 | DF | Gerardo Garcia | 31 May 1999 (aged 19) | (Salvadoran Football Federation) Santa Tecla F.C. |
| 16 | DF | Gabriel Escobar | 4 April 2000 (aged 18) | (Canadian Soccer Association) Whitecaps FC 2 |
| 17 | MF | Alvaro Arevalo | 11 February 1999 (aged 19) | (Salvadoran Football Federation) Santa Tecla F.C. |
| 18 | GK | Josael Isai Saravia Rios | 26 July 1999 (aged 19) | |
| 19 | FW | Cristian Rosales | 23 March 1999 (aged 19) | (Salvadoran Football Federation) Turín FESA F.C. |
| 20 | MF | Fernando Clavel | 28 September 1999 (aged 19) | (Salvadoran Football Federation) A.D. Isidro Metapán |

Replacements:

| No. | Pos. | Player | Date of birth (age) | Club |
|---|---|---|---|---|
| 21 | FW | (substituted on) Milton Campos | 28 August 2000 (aged 18) | |

=== Guatemala ===
Head coach: David Gardiner

| No. | Pos. | Player | Date of birth (age) | Club |
|---|---|---|---|---|
| 1 | GK | Brayan Hernandez | 5 March 2000 (aged 18) | (National Football Federation of Guatemala) C.D. Guastatoya |
| 2 | DF | José Ardon | 20 January 2000 (aged 18) | (National Football Federation of Guatemala) Antigua GFC |
| 3 | DF | Carlos De Leon | 31 March 1999 (aged 19) | (National Football Federation of Guatemala) C.D. Malacateco |
| 4 | DF | Fernando Fuentes | 5 April 1999 (aged 19) | (National Football Federation of Guatemala) C.S.D. Municipal |
| 5 | DF | Omar Dardon | 26 May 1999 (aged 19) | (National Football Federation of Guatemala) Deportivo Petapa |
| 6 | DF | Milton Andre Nova Estevez | 17 February 1999 (aged 19) | |
| 7 | FW | Óscar Mejía | 16 January 1999 (aged 19) | (National Football Federation of Guatemala) Comunicaciones F.C. |
| 8 | MF | Rudy Barrientos | 1 March 1999 (aged 19) | (National Football Federation of Guatemala) C.D. Guastatoya |
| 9 | FW | Edin Rivas | 7 June 2000 (aged 18) | (National Football Federation of Guatemala) Cobán Imperial |
| 10 | MF | Óscar Santis | 25 March 1999 (aged 19) | (National Football Federation of Guatemala) C.D. Suchitepéquez |
| 11 | FW | Luis Rosas | 7 June 1999 (aged 19) | (National Football Federation of Guatemala) Deportivo Siquinalá |
| 12 | GK | Fausto Santizo | 15 August 2000 (aged 18) | (National Football Federation of Guatemala) C.S.D. Municipal |
| 13 | DF | Carlos Alvarado | 14 February 1999 (aged 19) | (National Football Federation of Guatemala) C.S.D. Municipal |
| 14 | FW | Esnaydi Zuñiga | 12 October 1999 (aged 19) | (National Football Federation of Guatemala) Deportivo Petapa |
| 15 | MF | Carlos Soto | 31 August 2000 (aged 18) | (National Football Federation of Guatemala) C.D. Suchitepéquez |
| 16 | MF | Nery Cifuentes | 16 January 2000 (aged 18) | (National Football Federation of Guatemala) C.S.D. Municipal |
| 17 | DF | Oscar Castellanos | 18 January 2000 (aged 18) | (National Football Federation of Guatemala) Antigua GFC |
| 18 | FW | Leandro Pineda | 23 April 1999 (aged 19) | (National Football Federation of Guatemala) Deportivo Siquinalá |
| 19 | MF | Francis Mota | 21 October 1999 (aged 19) | (National Football Federation of Guatemala) C.S.D. Municipal |
| 20 | FW | Daniel Pirez Reyes | 24 October 1999 (aged 19) | |

=== Guyana ===
Head coach: Wayne Dover

| No. | Pos. | Player | Date of birth (age) | Club |
|---|---|---|---|---|
| 1 | GK | Johnathan Vaughn | 28 April 2000 (aged 18) | |
| 2 | DF | Nixon Robertson | 29 February 2000 (aged 18) | (Guyana Football Federation) Buxton United FC |
| 3 | DF | Cecil Jackman | 14 May 2000 (aged 18) | (Guyana Football Federation) Fruta Conquerors FC |
| 4 | DF | Jeremy Garrett | 1 January 2000 (aged 18) | (Guyana Football Federation) Fruta Conquerors FC |
| 5 | DF | Bevan Baker | 29 July 1999 (aged 19) | |
| 6 | DF | Lionel Holder | 24 June 1999 (aged 19) | |
| 7 | MF | Nicholas Mc Arthur | 21 December 2001 (aged 16) | (Guyana Football Federation) Fruta Conquerors FC |
| 8 | MF | Job Caesar | 1 January 1999 (aged 19) | (Guyana Football Federation) Fruta Conquerors FC |
| 9 | FW | Thair Britton | 26 November 1999 (aged 18) | |
| 10 | DF | Ryan Hackett | 11 September 1999 (aged 19) | (Guyana Football Federation) Fruta Conquerors FC |
| 11 | FW | Kelsey Benjamin | 8 May 1999 (aged 19) | (Guyana Football Federation) Western Tigers FC |
| 12 | FW | Hazlewood Hutson | 24 April 2001 (aged 17) | |
| 13 | FW | Leon Richardson | 23 April 1999 (aged 19) | (Guyana Football Federation) Fruta Conquerors FC |
| 14 | MF | Chris Macey | 16 December 1999 (aged 18) | (Guyana Football Federation) Den Amstel FC |
| 15 | DF | Raushan Ritch | 5 April 2000 (aged 18) | (Guyana Football Federation) Fruta Conquerors FC |
| 16 | MF | Michael Luke | 9 March 1999 (aged 19) | |
| 17 | MF | Jalen Case | 25 March 2000 (aged 18) | |
| 18 | MF | Ryan Dowding | 5 April 2000 (aged 18) | |
| 19 | DF | Kwai Marsh Brown | 1 June 1999 (aged 19) | (The Football Association) Whitehawk F.C. |
| 20 | GK | Jamaine Cumberbatch | 21 April 1999 (aged 19) | (Guyana Football Federation) Den Amstel FC |
