= 2022–23 Sint Maarten Premier League =

Sint Maarten Premier League
- Season: 2022–23
- Dates: 22 October 2022 – 1 April 2023
- Champions: SCSA Eagles
- Caribbean Shield: SCSA Eagles
- Top goalscorer: Khalid Tavernier

The 2022–23 Sint Maarten Premier League was the 46th season of the Sint Maarten Premier League, the top tier of association football in Sint Maarten. The season began on 22 October 2022 and concluded on 1 April 2023.

SCSA Eagles successfully defended their league title, winning their second-ever league championship.

== Participating clubs ==
Six clubs participated ahead of the season. Reggae Lions and Soualiga did not participate in the 2022–23 season.

Club	Location	Venue	Capacity	2021–22 position
758 Boyz	Philipsburg	Raoul Illidge Sports Complex	3,000	3rd
Belvedere	Lower Prince's Quarter	Jose Lake Senior Ball Park	2,000	7th
C&D Connection	Philipsburg	Raoul Illidge Sports Complex	3,000	2nd
Flames United	Philipsburg	Raoul Illidge Sports Complex	3,000	4th
Hott Spurs	Little Bay	Zagersgut Cricket Field	600	6th
SCSA Eagles	Philipsburg	Raoul Illidge Sports Complex	3,000	1st

== Table ==
Pos	Team	Pld	W	D	L	Pts	Qualification or relegation
1	SCSA Eagles (C)	9	7	2	0	23	Advance to 2024 CONCACAF Caribbean Shield
2	758 Boyz	9	6	2	1	20	
3	Hot Spurs	9	2	0	7	6	
4	Belvedere	9	1	0	8	3	
5	C&D Connection	0	0	0	0	0	Withdrew; all results annulled
6	Flames United	0	0	0	0	0	Withdrew; all results annulled

Source: SXMFF
(C) Champions
