= Sint Maartener football clubs in international competitions =

This is a list of Sint Maartener football clubs in international competitions. Sint Maartener clubs have participated in international club competitions since at least 1956, when there was the Bonaire–Sint Maarten series. Sint Maartener clubs have participated in competitive CONCACAF football competitions since at least 2017 when Flames United entered the 2017 CFU Club Championship. To date this is the only time a Sint Maartener team has participated in a CONCACAF competition.

No Sint Maartener team has won any CONCACAF competition, or won a single game in the competition, and Sint Maartener clubs have infrequently participated in CONCACAF tournaments due to logistical issues.

== Who qualifies for CONCACAF competitions ==
Since 2018, the winner of the SMSA Senior League, the top tier of football on the island qualifies for the Caribbean Club Shield, a tertiary knockout tournament for developing Caribbean football nations. This competition is held in the spring. This also serves as a qualifying for the CONCACAF League, which played tha fall. The CONCACAF League is the secondary association football competition for club football in North America. Should a team finish in the top six standings of the CONCACAF League, they qualify for the CONCACAF Champions League, which is played the following winter.

In order for a Sint Maartener team to reach the Champions League, they would need to win the Caribbean Club Shield and then earn a top six finish in the CONCACAF League.

== Results by competition ==
=== CFU Club Championship ===
Season	Club	Round	Opponent	Home	Away	Agg.	Ref.
2017	Flames United	Group E	(Guadeloupe) Moulien	0–8		0–8	
2017	Flames United	Group E	(Trinidad and Tobago) San Juan Jabloteh	0–9		0–9	
2017	Flames United	Group E	(Saint Vincent and the Grenadines) System 3	2–9		2–9	
2021	Flames United	Group A	(Dominican Republic) O&M	1–11		1–11	
2021	Flames United	Group A	(Suriname) Inter Moengotapoe	0–12		0–12	

=== CFU Club Shield ===
Season	Club	Round	Opponent	Home	Away	Agg.	Ref.
2020	C&D Connection	Cancelled due to the COVID-19 pandemic					
2021	Flames United	Cancelled due to the COVID-19 pandemic					
2024	SCSA Eagles	Preliminary round	(Saint Lucia) BAYS FC	0–1			
2025	SCSA Eagles	Group C	(Antigua and Barbuda) All Saints United	1–3			
2025	SCSA Eagles	Group C	(Trinidad and Tobago) Police	1–6			
2026	SCSA Eagles	R1	(Saint Vincent and the Grenadines) North Leeward Predators	1–3			

=== Division Excellence ===
The Division Excellence was a series between clubs in Sint Maarten, Saint-Martin, the northern French territory half of the island, and the nearby island of Saint-Barthélemy.

Season	Club	Round	Opponent	Home	Away	Agg.	Ref.
2011–12	Flames United	Runners-up	Junior Stars	1–2		1–2	
2011–12	Hotspurs	Quarterfinals	(Saint Barthélemy) Young Stars	1–0	1–3	2–3	
2012–13	Flames United	Winners	Orléans Attackers	1–1 (p)		1–1 (p)	
2012–13	Young Strikers	Group B	Concordia, Junior Stars, (Saint Barthélemy) Ouanalao			4th place	
2014	Flames United	Group A	Cancelled				
2014	Hotspurs	Group B	Cancelled				
2014	Young Strikers	Group A	Cancelled				

=== Bonaire Tour ===
Year	Club	Opponent	Result	Ref.
1956	Blitz	(Bonaire) Flamingo	unknown	

=== Statia Tour ===
Year	Club	Opponent	Result	Ref.
1982	Sparta	(Sint Eustatius) Statia XI	4–1	
1982	Sparta	(Sint Eustatius) Statia XI	5–1	

== Appearances in CONCACAF competitions ==
As of July 24, 2026

Club	Total						CCL	CFU	CCS	CWC	First Appearance	Last Appearance
Club	Apps	Pld	W	D	L	Win%	CCL	CFU	CCS	CWC	First Appearance	Last Appearance
Flames United	2	5	0	0	5	.000	0	2	0	0	2021 Caribbean Club Championship	
SCSA Eagles	3	4	0	0	4	.000	0	0	3	0	2026 CFU Club Shield	
