= 2016–17 Sint Maarten Senior League =

SMSA Senior League
- Season: 2016–17
- CFU Club Championship: Reggae Lions; Flames United
- Biggest home win: Young Strikers 10-0 Veendam (5 February 2017)
- Biggest away win: Veendam 2-11 Funmakers (19 March 2017)
- Highest scoring: Veendam 2-11 Funmakers (19 March 2017)
- Longest winless run: 16 games: Veendam (2 Oct – 10 Apr)
- All statistics correct as of 19 April 2017.

The 2016–17 Sint Maarten Soccer Association (SMSA) Senior League was the 41st season of top division football in Sint Maarten. The season begin on 2 October 2016 and ended on 10 April 2017.

Defending champions Flames United were the defending champions, but finished runners-up to Reggae Lions. Both teams earned a berth in the 2018 Caribbean Club Championship, should they elect to participate in the tournament.

== Clubs ==
A total of nine clubs participated during the season. Each team played every other team twice: once home and once away, for a 16-match season. Below is the table based on reported results.

== Table ==
Pos	Team	Pld	W	D	L	GF	GA	GD	Pts	Qualification or relegation
1	Reggae Lions (C)	16	10	3	3	45	16	+29	33	2018 Caribbean Club Championship
2	Flames United	16	9	3	4	43	17	+26	30	2018 Caribbean Club Championship
3	C&D Connection	16	9	3	4	33	25	+8	30	
4	Funmakers	16	7	6	3	51	29	+22	27	
5	Young Strikers	16	8	3	5	32	25	+7	27	
6	United Super Stars	16	5	3	8	30	39	−9	18	
7	Soualiga	16	5	3	8	25	38	−13	18	
8	Hot Spurs	16	4	4	8	18	31	−13	16	
9	Veendam	16	0	2	14	20	77	−57	2	

Updated to match(es) played on 20 April 2017.
Source: https://www.rsssf.org/tabless/stmaarten2017.html
(C) Champions
