= 2018–19 Sint Maarten Senior League =

Sint Maarten Senior League
- Season: 2018–19

The 2018–19 Sint Maarten Senior League is the 42nd season of the Sint Maarten Senior League, the top-tier football league in Sint Maarten. The season began on 28 October 2018.

== Regular season ==
Pos	Team	Pld	W	D	L	Pts	Qualification or relegation
1	FC Soualiga (A)	18	13	1	4	40	Advance to Playoffs
2	C&D Connection (A)	18	13	1	4	40	Advance to Playoffs
3	758 Boyz (A)	18	11	3	4	36	Advance to Playoffs
4	Flames United (A)	18	11	2	5	35	Advance to Playoffs
5	Reggae Lions	18	11	0	7	33	
6	United Super Stars	18	10	3	5	33	
7	Young Strikers	18	8	4	6	28	
8	Hot Spurs	18	3	0	15	9	
9	Oualichi	18	2	0	16	6	
10	Veendam	18	0	0	18	0	
11	Funmakers	0	0	0	0	0	

Source: SXMFF
(A) Advance to a further round

== Playoffs ==
Semifinals (22 June)
2	C&D Connection
3	758 Boyz
1	FC Soualiga
4	Flames United

Final (29 June)
2	C&D Connection	1
1	FC Soualiga	0
Third place
3	758 Boyz	2
4	Flames United	3
