= Andre Knol =

Dutch footballer (born 2000)

Personal information
- Date of birth: 20 September 2000 (age 26)
- Place of birth: Philipsburg, Sint Maarten
- Position: Midfielder

Team information
- Current team: Funmakers FC
- Number: 3

Youth career
- 2011–: M.P.C. Stars

Senior career*
Years	Team	Apps	(Gls)
2016–	Funmakers FC		

International career^{‡}
2016–	Sint Maarten	2	(0)
- * Club domestic league appearances and goals as of 01:13, 6 December 2016 (UTC) ‡ National team caps and goals as of 12:47, 16 August 2018 (UTC)

Andre Knol (born 20 September 2000) is a St. Maartener international footballer who plays as a midfielder for Funmakers FC of the SMSA Senior League. At one point, he was one of the top four youngest senior international players in the world.

== Youth career ==
Knol has played club football in the St. Maarten Soccer Educational Foundation (SMSEF) youth league since at least 2011. That year he was named one of the league's all-stars that would compete in the all-star match. In 2013, he played for the M.P.C. Stars of Milton Peters College. The team reached the tournament final that year after two tallied two goals and an assist in the semi-final against Leonald Conner FC. He also played for the team in 2014 and scored two goals in the final as M.P.C stars defeated St. Dominic High School 6–2 to win the U13 Championship.

== Club career ==
In 2016, Knol began playing for Funmakers FC of the SMSA Senior League.

== International career ==
In August 2015, Knol was named to Sint Maarten's squad for the 2015 CFU Under-15 Championship co-hosted by Sint Maarten and Anguilla. In June 2016, he was called up for 2017 CONCACAF U-20 Championship qualifying as Sint Maarten hosted its group's matches.

Knol made his senior international debut for Sint Maarten in a friendly against Anguilla on 13 March 2016 at age 15. The match was Sint Maarten's first senior international in over ten years and was played in preparation for each side's 2017 Caribbean Cup qualification campaigns which were set to begin the following week.

=== International career statistics ===
As of match played 26 March 2019.

Sint Maarten national team
Year	Apps	Goals
2016	1	0
2017	0	0
2018	2	0
2019	1	0
Total	4	0
