= List of designated monuments in Sint Maarten =

Sint Maarten has 51 designated monuments. The first objects were given this protected status in 2005.

== Dutch Cul de Sac ==
Dutch Cul de Sac has 5 designated monuments

	Object	Image	Location	Year of construction
B-008		Upload Photo	105 L.B. Scot Road^{Coordinates missing}	
B-010	Mary's Fancy Plantation	Upload Photo	L.B. Scott Road; 18°02′30″N 63°03′47″W	
B-012	Ebenezer Plantation	Upload Photo	S. Hazel/R. Mayan Roads, St. Peter; 18°03′09″N 63°01′59″W	
B-007	Dutch Reformed Cemetery	Upload Photo	18°02′08″N 63°03′58″W	
B-009	Emilio Wilson Estate	Upload Photo	18°02′34″N 63°03′51″W	1600s

== Little Bay ==
Little Bay has 2 designated monuments

	Object	Image	Location	Year of construction
B-005	Fort Willem	Upload Photo	Fort Hill; 18°01′32″N 63°03′38″W	1801
B-004	Fort Amsterdam	Fort Amsterdam	Little Bay Peninsula; 18°00′53″N 63°03′35″W	1631

== Lower Prince's Quarter ==
Lower Prince's Quarter has 4 designated monuments

	Object	Image	Location	Year of construction
B-015	Madam Estate	Upload Photo	A.T. Illidge Road^{Coordinates missing}	
B-018	Bishop Hill Plantation	Upload Photo	Bishop Hill Road^{Coordinates missing}	
B-016	Union Farm Estate	Upload Photo	Dutch Quarter^{Coordinates missing}	
B-017	Bethlehem Plantation	Upload Photo	Dutch Quarter-French Quarter^{Coordinates missing}	

== Philipsburg ==
Philipsburg has 33 designated monuments

	Object	Image	Location	Year of construction
B-020	Foga Salt Factory	Upload Photo	Arch Road^{Coordinates missing}	1862
P-006		Upload Photo	28 Back Street^{Coordinates missing}	
P-013		Upload Photo	44 Back Street^{Coordinates missing}	
P-017	Dollison Family House	Upload Photo	88 Back Street; 18°02′43″N 63°02′55″W	
P-018		Upload Photo	93 Back Street; 18°03′00″N 63°02′31″W	
P-032		Upload Photo	152 Back Street^{Coordinates missing}	
P-033		Upload Photo	153 Back Street; 18°03′07″N 63°02′16″W	
P-171		Upload Photo	171 Back Street^{Coordinates missing}	
P-092	Sweet Repose/ Sr Borgia School	Upload Photo	Cannegieter Street; 18°01′28″N 63°02′40″W	1910
B-001	Vineyard Estate	Vineyard Estate	East Philipsburg^{Coordinates missing}	
P-047	Pasanggrahan Royal Guest House	Pasanggrahan Royal Guest House	Front Street^{Coordinates missing}	1905
P-058	Courthouse	Courthouse	Front Street; 18°01′26″N 63°02′45″W	1793, 1825 (rebuilt after hurricane)
P-045	Guavaberry Emporium	Guavaberry Emporium	8 Front Street; 18°01′19″N 63°02′33″W	
P-048	St. Joseph Convent	Upload Photo	26 Front Street^{Coordinates missing}	
P-050	St. Joseph School	Upload Photo	28 Front Street; 18°01′30″N 63°02′51″W	
P-052	Rink House	Upload Photo	37 Front Street; 18°01′23″N 63°02′41″W	1750-1780
P-054	St. Martin of Tours' Church	St. Martin of Tours' Church	51 Front Street; 18°01′30″N 63°02′51″W	1952
P-056		Upload Photo	56 Front Street^{Coordinates missing}	
P-057		Upload Photo	57 Front Street; 18°01′30″N 63°02′51″W	
P-059		Upload Photo	59 Front Street; 18°01′24″N 63°02′42″W	
P-060	Methodist Church	Methodist Church	90 Front Street; 18°01′28″N 63°02′51″W	
P-061	Methodist Manse	Methodist Manse	In Methodist Church yard^{Coordinates missing}	1932
P-062	Brick Building	Upload Photo	in Methodist Church yard^{Coordinates missing}	
P-063	L'Escargot	L'Escargot	96 Front Street; 18°01′28″N 63°02′53″W	
P-065	Oranje School	Upload Photo	100 Front Street; 18°01′29″N 63°02′54″W	1738
P-068		Upload Photo	113 Front Street; 18°01′30″N 63°02′51″W	
P-073		Upload Photo	134 Front Street^{Coordinates missing}	
P-074	The White House	Upload Photo	144 Front Street; 18°01′30″N 63°02′51″W	
P-080	De Weever House	Upload Photo	171 Front Street^{Coordinates missing}	
P-093		Upload Photo	4 Hendrikstraat; 18°01′26″N 63°02′44″W	
P-094	Zoutpakhuis	Upload Photo	6 Hendrikstraat; 18°01′26″N 63°02′44″W	
B-021	Verkavelingen Zoutpannen Great Salt Pond en dijk	Upload Photo	north/east Great Salt Pond^{Coordinates missing}	
P-099	Van Putten House	Upload Photo	3 Smid Steeg; 18°01′30″N 63°03′00″W	

== Simpson Bay ==
Simpson Bay has 5 designated monuments

	Object	Image	Location	Year of construction
S-013	Simpson Bay Old Bridge	Upload Photo	Behind Atrium^{Coordinates missing}	
S-009	Simpson Bay Government Cistern	Upload Photo	Simpson Bay Road^{Coordinates missing}	
S-000		Upload Photo	11 Simpson Bay Road^{Coordinates missing}	
S-005	St. Petrus Gonzales Chapel	St. Petrus Gonzales Chapel	28 Simpson Bay Road^{Coordinates missing}	1879
S-011		Upload Photo	44 Simpson Bay Road^{Coordinates missing}	

== Upper Prince's Quarter ==
Upper Prince's Quarter has 2 designated monuments

	Object	Image	Location	Year of construction
B-002	St. Peters Battery	Upload Photo	J. Yrausquin Blvd; 18°01′00″N 63°02′27″W	1800s
B-019	Belvedere Plantation	Upload Photo	Oysterpond Road; 18°01′00″N 63°02′27″W	
