= Sjoerd van Griensven =

Dutch footballer (born 1991)

Personal information
- Full name: Sjoerd Gerardus Antonius van Griensven
- Date of birth: 20 June 1991 (age 35)
- Place of birth: Netherlands
- Positions: Defender; goalkeeper

Senior career*
Years	Team	Apps	(Gls)
–2016	OKSV		
2016–2018	Funmakers		
2018–2022	Reggae Lions		

International career
2018–2019	Sint Maarten	5	(0)
- * Club domestic league appearances and goals

Sjoerd Gerardus Antonius van Griensven (born 20 June 1991) is a footballer who played as a defender and goalkeeper. Born in the Netherlands, he was a Sint Maarten international.

== Career ==
Van Griensven hails from Overlangel, near Oss, and started his career with hometown, Dutch tenth tier side OKSV. In 2016, he signed for Funmakers in Sint Maarten.
