= Liberation Stars =

Caribbean soccer team

The Liberation Stars are a Sint Maarten football club based in Philipsburg who competed in the Sint Maarten League while it was still in existence. The club has been reported to have been playing in Sint Maarten's top division since 2002, although the most recent records are from 2007.
