= SCSA Eagles =

- Full name: Social Cultural Sport Association Eagles
- Founded: 2019; 7 years ago
- Ground: Raoul Illidge Sports Complex
- Capacity: 3,000
- Chairman: Andreas Joedoleksono
- Manager: Guidarie Burton
- League: Sint Maarten Premier League
- 2025–26: 1st, Champions
- Website: Website

SCSA Eagles is a Sint Maarten professional football club from Philipsburg that currently plays in the Sint Maarten Premier League. The club fields teams for youth, men, and women.

== History ==
SCSA Eagles won its first Sint Maarten Premier League championship for the 2021/2022 season. That year, the Eagles defeated Flames United SC in the final, giving the club its first defeat of the season. The following season, the club edged out C&D Connection on points to win back-to-back titles.

The club debuted in international competition as Sint Maarten's representative in the 2024 CFU Club Shield. The club was eliminated from the tournament with a 0–1 defeat to Saint Lucia's BAYS FC in the Preliminary Round. SCSA Eagles then qualified for the next edition of the tournament.

== Achievements ==
- Sint Maarten Premier League
  - Winner (5): 2021–22, 2022–23, 2023–24, 2024–25, 2025-26

== International competition ==
Results list SCSA Eagles's goal tally first.

Competition	Round	Club	Score
2024 CFU Club Shield	Preliminary Round	(Saint Lucia) BAYS	0–1
2025 CFU Club Shield	Group Stage	(Antigua and Barbuda) All Saints United	1–3
2025 CFU Club Shield	Group Stage	(Trinidad and Tobago) Police	1–6
2026 CFU Club Shield	First Round	(Saint Vincent and the Grenadines) North Leeward Predators	1–3
