= List of football clubs in Sint Maarten =

Following is a list of football clubs located in Sint Maarten, sorted alphabetically.

- D&P Connection FC
- Flames United SC
- Funmakers FC
- Haitian United
- Hot Spurs
- Jah Rebels
- Liberation Stars
- Lucian United
- Organized Youth
- Reggae Lions
- RISC Takers FC
- FC Soualiga
- United Super Stars FC
- United Warlords
- Veendam FC
- Victory Boys
- Young Strikers FC
