= Connor Querrard =

United States Virgin Islander footballer

Personal information
- Full name: Connor Joseph Querrard
- Date of birth: 6 April 2002 (age 24)
- Place of birth: Saint Croix, U.S. Virgin Islands
- Height: 1.91 m (6 ft 3 in)
- Position: Goalkeeper

Youth career
- St. Benedict's Prep

College career
Years	Team	Apps	(Gls)
2020–	Assumption Greyhounds	0	(0)

International career^{‡}
- US Virgin Islands U15
2019	US Virgin Islands U17	4	(0)
2018	US Virgin Islands U20	5	(0)
2019	US Virgin Islands U23		
2019–	US Virgin Islands	1	(0)
- ‡ National team caps and goals as of 1 March 2020

Connor Joseph Querrard (born 6 April 2002) is a Virgin Islander footballer who plays as a goalkeeper for the Assumption College Greyhounds and the US Virgin Islands national football team.

== Career ==
=== Youth career ===
Querrard played at St. Benedict's Preparatory School, where he played football, volleyball, and basketball in addition to soccer.

=== College career ===
After contemplating whether to play in the United States or stay in the U.S. Virgin Islands, Querrard decided to play college soccer in the U.S., as he signed to play at Assumption College in Massachusetts.

However, he did not make an appearance in his first season with the Greyhounds.

=== International career ===
Querrard joined the youth national team system by playing with the national under-15 team. He played in the 2018 CONCACAF U-20 Championship, as well as qualifiers for the 2019 CONCACAF U-17 Championship and 2020 CONCACAF Men's Olympic Qualifying Championship.

Querrard made his senior international debut on 19 November 2019, coming on as a late substitute for Lionel Brown in a 2-1 defeat to Saint Martin during CONCACAF Nations League play.

== Career statistics ==
=== International ===
As of match played 19 November 2019

National team	Year	Apps	Goals
US Virgin Islands	2019	1	0
Total		1	0
