= St. Martin of Tours' Church, Sint Maarten =

Coordinates: 18°1′30.14″N 63°2′51.29″W

St. Martin of Tours' Church
- Sint Martinus van Tours Kerk
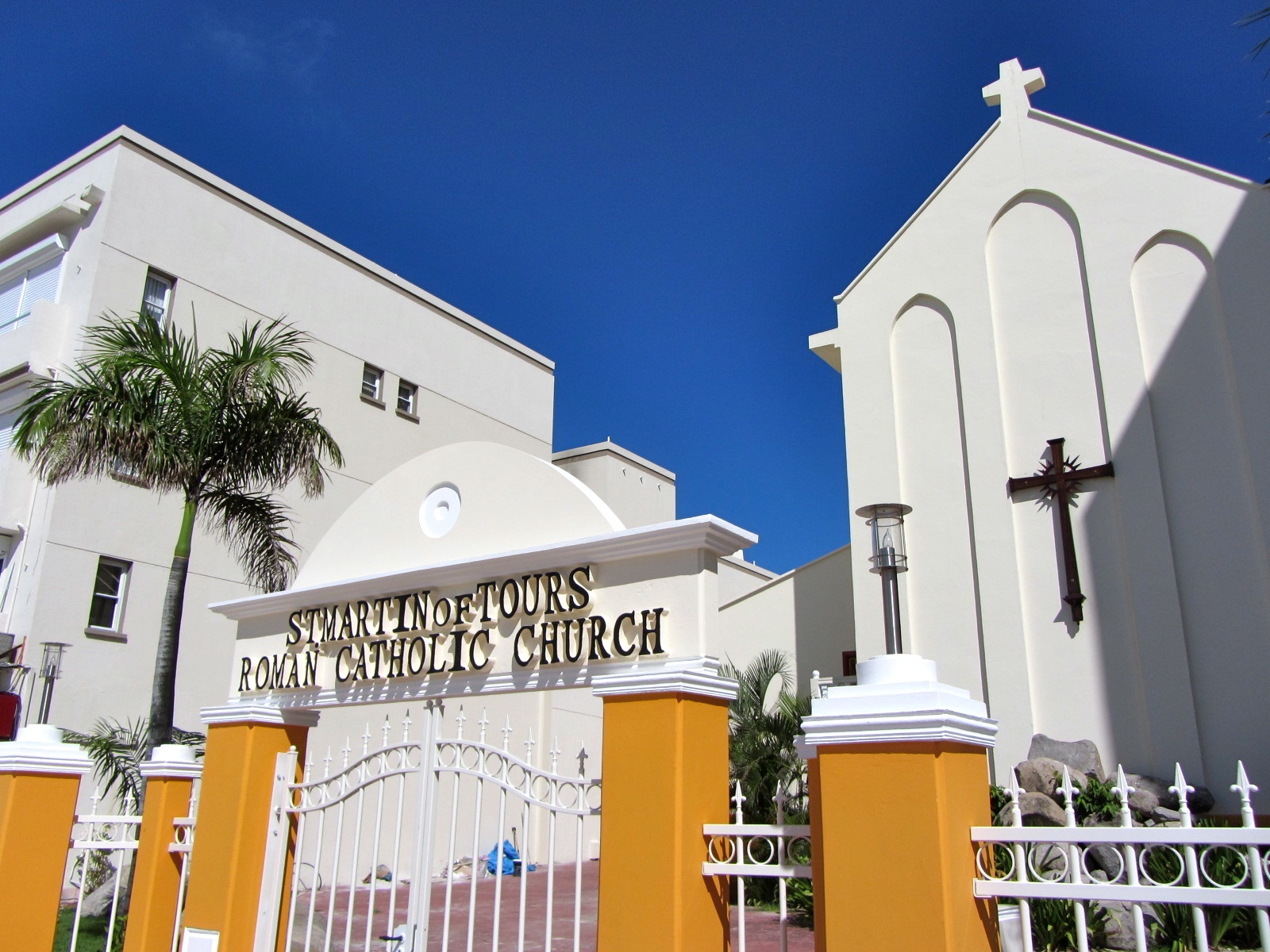
- St. Martin of Tours' Church
- Location: Sint Maarten
- Country: Netherlands
- Denomination: Roman Catholic Church

The St. Martin of Tours' Church (Dutch: Sint Martinus van Tours Kerk) is a religious building is located at 51 Voorstraat, Voorstraat, in the city of Philipsburg, Sint Maarten on the Dutch side of the Caribbean island of St. Martin in the Lesser Antilles east of the Caribbean Sea or Sea The Antilles.

It is a temple that follows the Roman or Latin rite and depends on the Catholic Diocese of Willemstad based on the island of Curaçao. It is also one of the three Catholic churches in the Dutch part of the island being the other two, Mary Star of the Sea in Simpson Bay (Maria Sterre der Zee kerk), and Risen Christ in South Reward .

Most Masses and religious services at the temple are conducted in English with a single Mass in Spanish the Sundays.

The present church on Front Street has its origins in 1844 when the first stone of the temple was laid. In 1933 he raised the need for expansion and this was carried out and completed on May 30, 1952.

== See also ==
- Roman Catholicism in Sint Maarten
- St. Martin of Tours
