= Quinaceo Hunt =

Bermudan footballer

Personal information
- Full name: Quinaceo Tyce Evan Hunt
- Date of birth: 21 January 2000 (age 26)
- Place of birth: Bermuda
- Position: Goalkeeper

Team information
- Current team: Pickering Town

Senior career*
| Years | Team | Apps | (Gls) |
| 2016–2019 | PHC Zebras | | |
| 2019–2020 | Wakefield | | |
| 2020 | Durham City | 3 | (0) |
| 2021 | Billingham Synthonia | 0 | (0) |
| 2021 | Tow Law Town | | |
| 2021– | Thornaby | | |

International career^{‡}
- Bermuda U17
| 2018 | Bermuda U20 | 4 | (0) |
| 2017– | Bermuda | 1 | (0) |
- * Club domestic league appearances and goals as of 15:44, 31 December 2021 (UTC) ‡ National team caps and goals as of 15:44, 31 December 2021 (UTC)

Quinaceo Tyce Evan Hunt (born 21 January 2000) is a Bermudan footballer who currently plays as a goalkeeper for Pickering Town.

== Club career ==
Hunt started his career in Bermuda with the PHC Zebras. In 2019 he moved to England to sign for newly created club Wakefield.

Following his departure from Wakefield, Hunt joined Durham City, where he went on to make three appearances in the Northern Football League. However, in December 2020, it was announced that Hunt would join Billingham Synthonia for 2021.

His spell with Billingham Synthonia did not last long, and in August 2021, he signed for Tow Law Town. However, this spell was even shorter, and in September of the same year, he moved to Thornaby.

== Career statistics ==
=== Club ===
As of 31 December 2021.

Appearances and goals by club, season and competition
| Club | Season | League | | | Cup | | Other | | Total | |
| Club | Season | Division | Apps | Goals | Apps | Goals | Apps | Goals | Apps | Goals |
|---|---|---|---|---|---|---|---|---|---|---|
| Durham City | 2020–21 | Northern Football League | 3 | 0 | 0 | 0 | 0 | 0 | 3 | 0 |
| Career total | | | 3 | 0 | 0 | 0 | 0 | 0 | 3 | 0 |

=== International ===
As of matches played 16 June 2019.

| National team | Year | Apps | Goals |
|---|---|---|---|
| Bermuda | 2017 | 1 | 0 |
| Total | | 1 | 0 |
