= CFU Boy's Under-15 Championship =

2015 CFU Boy's Under-15 Championship

Tournament details
- Dates: 8 August 2015 – 16 August 2015
- Teams: 12 (from 1 sub-confederation)
- Venue(s): 2 (in 2 host cities)

Final positions
- Champions: Curaçao (1st title)
- Runners-up: Dominican Republic
- Third place: Cayman Islands

The 2015 CFU Boys' Under-15 Championship is the inaugural Under-15 Championship organised by the Caribbean Football Union. The competition was created following the cancellation of the CONCACAF-organised Under-15 Championship. The tournament is to prepare players for the 2017 CONCACAF U-17 Tournament.

== Venues ==
The Valley, Anguilla	Philipsburg, Sint Maarten
Raymond Guishard Technical Center	Raoul Illidge Sports Complex
18.218143°N 63.050151°W	18.028761°N 63.066641°W

== Group stage ==
=== Group A ===
Pos	Team	Pld	W	D	L	GF	GA	GD	Pts	Qualification
1	Cayman Islands	3	3	0	0	14	0	+14	9	Advance to quarter-finals
2	Saint Lucia	3	2	0	1	12	2	+10	6	Advance to quarter-finals
3	Anguilla	3	1	0	2	3	13	−10	3	Advance to quarter-finals
4	U.S. Virgin Islands	3	0	0	3	1	15	−14	0	

8 August 2015
15:00

Cayman Islands	2–0	Saint Lucia
Kareem Foster 3'; Kion Parchmont 64'	report

Raymond Guishard Technical Center, Anguilla
8 August 2015
17:00

Anguilla	3–1	U.S. Virgin Islands
	report

Raymond Guishard Technical Center, Anguilla
9 August 2015
15:00

U.S. Virgin Islands	0–4	Cayman Islands
	report	Kion Parchmont 4'; Cody Ebanks 8'; Kareem Foster 47'; D'andre Rowe 64'

Raymond Guishard Technical Center, Anguilla
9 August 2015
17:00

Anguilla	0–4	Saint Lucia
Riquelme Sylvester 12', 40'; Gabriel Biscette 22'; Linus Clovis 37'	report

Raymond Guishard Technical Center, Anguilla
10 August 2015
15:00

Saint Lucia	8-0	U.S. Virgin Islands
Bryant Polius 1'; Daniel Biscette 12'; Gabriel Biscette 15'; Riquelme Sylvester 25'; Daniel Biscette 35'; Romario Lendor 44'; Linis Clovis 70'; Grant Farrell 59' (o.g.)	report

Raymond Guishard Technical Center, Anguilla
10 August 2015
17:00

Anguilla	0-8	Cayman Islands
	report	Nicholas Chung 2'; Kareem Foster 35', 68'; Gonzalo Mclaughlin JR 19'; Kareem Medez 45'; Jose La Rosa Ebanks 62'; Kion Parchmont 63'

Raymond Guishard Technical Center, Anguilla

=== Group B ===
Pos	Team	Pld	W	D	L	GF	GA	GD	Pts	Qualification
1	Dominican Republic	3	3	0	0	9	0	+9	9	Advance to quarter-finals
2	Grenada	3	2	0	1	2	3	−1	6	Advance to quarter-finals
3	Bonaire	3	0	1	2	0	3	−3	1	
4	Saint Kitts and Nevis	3	0	1	2	0	5	−5	1	

8 August 2015
09:30

Dominican Republic	3–0	Grenada
Freddy Feliz 40'; Brayan Chang 51'; Jose Yunior Fancisco 70+2'	report

Raoul Illidge Sports Complex, St. Maarten
8 August 2015
15:00

Saint Kitts and Nevis	0–0	Bonaire
	report

Raoul Illidge Sports Complex, St. Maarten
9 August 2015
09:30

Dominican Republic	4–0	Saint Kitts and Nevis
Gabriel Angeles 6', 44'; Pavel Bergaglio 35'; Bryan Chang 69'	report

Raoul Illidge Sports Complex, St. Maarten
9 August 2015
15:00

Bonaire	0–1	Grenada
	report	Sherwin Williams 12'

Raoul Illidge Sports Complex, St. Maarten
10 August 2015
09:30

Grenada	1-0	Saint Kitts and Nevis
Kobe Thomas 52'	report

Raoul Illidge Sports Complex, St. Maarten
10 August 2015
15:00

Bonaire	0-2	Dominican Republic
	report	Freddy Feliz 8', 17'

Raoul Illidge Sports Complex, St. Maarten

=== Group C ===
Pos	Team	Pld	W	D	L	GF	GA	GD	Pts	Qualification
1	Curaçao	3	3	0	0	15	1	+14	9	Advance to quarter-finals
2	Antigua and Barbuda	3	2	0	1	11	4	+7	6	Advance to quarter-finals
3	Saint Vincent and the Grenadines	3	1	0	2	2	9	−7	3	Advance to quarter-finals
4	Sint Maarten	3	0	0	3	0	14	−14	0	

8 August 2015
17:00

Curaçao	4–1	Antigua and Barbuda
Angerick Dorothea 4', 40'; Nathan Bernadina 10', 19'	report	Shalon Knight 70'

Raoul Illidge Sports Complex, St. Maarten
8 August 2015
19:00

Sint Maarten	0–2	Saint Vincent and the Grenadines
	report	Javorn Clasp 25'; Feron Kelly 33'

Raoul Illidge Sports Complex, St. Maarten
9 August 2015
17:00

Saint Vincent and the Grenadines	0–7	Curaçao
	report	Nahtan Bernadina 12', 25', 45'; Shurendric Fransinet 33', 66', 68'; Angerick Dorothea 47'

Raoul Illidge Sports Complex, St. Maarten
9 August 2015
19:00

Sint Maarten	0–8	Antigua and Barbuda
	report	Sharlon Knight 14', 22', 41'; D' Jarie Sheppard 30', 32', 36'; Javorn Benjamin 20', 44'

Raoul Illidge Sports Complex, St. Maarten
10 August 2015
17:00

Antigua and Barbuda	2-0	Saint Vincent and the Grenadines
D'Jarie Sheppard 36'; Shalon Knight 60'	report

Raoul Illidge Sports Complex, St. Maarten
10 August 2015
19:00

Sint Maarten	0-4	Curaçao
	report	Nathan Bernadina 7', 35'; Sharrion Pietersz 15'; Shurendic Frasinet 65'

Raoul Illidge Sports Complex, St. Maarten

== Knockout stage ==
=== Quarter-finals ===
12 August 2015
09:00

Dominican Republic	5–1	Saint Vincent and the Grenadines
Pavel Bergaglio 3'; Freddy Feliz 6'; Jose Manuel Matos 26', 63'; Juan Gabriel Angeles 34'	report	Garrett Liegertwood 41'

Raoul Illidge Sports Complex, St. Maarten
12 August 2015
15:00

Saint Lucia	4–0	Grenada
Riquelme Sylvester 6'; Linus Clovis 13', 35'; Bryant Polius 23'	report

Raoul Illidge Sports Complex, St. Maarten
12 August 2015
17:00

Cayman Islands	3–1	Antigua and Barbuda
Kareem Foster 47'; Cody Ebanks 56'; Francisco Murillo 56'	report	Shalon Knight 35'

Raoul Illidge Sports Complex, St. Maarten
12 August 2015
19:00

Curaçao	7–0	Anguilla
Luchenthly Vrutaal 1', 8', 11', 37', 70'; Angerick Dorothea 67'; Nathan Bernadina 62'	report

Raoul Illidge Sports Complex, St. Maarten

=== Semi-finals ===
14 August 2015
17:00

Dominican Republic	1–0	Cayman Islands
Juan Gabriel Angeles 6' (pen.)	report

Raoul Illidge Sports Complex, St. Maarten
14 August 2015
19:00

Saint Lucia	1–2	Curaçao
Linus Clovis 67'	report	Jonathan Libania 32'; Nathan Bernadina 68'

Raoul Illidge Sports Complex, St. Maarten

=== Third place playoff ===
16 August 2015
17:00

Cayman Islands	1–1	Saint Lucia
Kareem Foster 8'		Riquelme Sylvester 35'
Penalties
	5–4

Raoul Illidge Sports Complex, St. Maarten

=== Final ===
16 August 2015
19:00

Dominican Republic	2–4	Curaçao
Freddy Feliz 3', 39'	report	Luchently Vrutaal 8', 70'; Nathan Bernadina 59', 64'

Raoul Illidge Sports Complex, St. Maarten

== Awards ==
Most Valuable Player

- (Curaçao) Nathan Bernadina

Golden Boots

- (Curaçao) Nathan Bernadina

Golden Glove Award

- (Dominican Republic) Mario Jose Marte
