= Erwan Regulus =

Guadeloupean footballer (born 2000)

Personal information
- Date of birth: 15 May 2000 (age 26)
- Place of birth: Guadeloupe
- Height: 1.88 m (6 ft 2 in)
- Position: Goalkeeper

Team information
- Current team: JA Drancy

Youth career
- AJC
- Stade Lamentinois

Senior career*
Years	Team	Apps	(Gls)
–2019	Stade Lamentinois		
2019–	JA Drancy	20	(0)

International career^{‡}
- Guadeloupe U20
2019–	Guadeloupe	1	(0)
- * Club domestic league appearances and goals as of 11:37, 29 October 2020 (UTC) ‡ National team caps and goals as of 11:37, 29 October 2020 (UTC)

Erwan Regulus (born 15 May 2000) is a Guadeloupean footballer who plays as a goalkeeper for French side JA Drancy and the Guadeloupe team.

== Club career ==
Regulus began his career at AJC before joining the Stade Lamentinois youth setup. He was promoted to the first-team from the U19 squad and played one season in the local Guadeloupe Division of Honor before moving to Paris to continue his studies, where he was recruited by Philippe Lemaître, manager of National 2 side JA Drancy in the northeastern suburbs of the city. He signed a contract with the club in July 2019, even though they had just added veteran keeper Mignon N'Dingha. The 19-year-old made his team debut on 10 August 2019 as the starting keeper on the first matchday and kept a clean sheet in their win over Haguenau. He was named man of the match by Le Parisien for his performance in his second start, a 1–0 loss to SC Schiltigheim at home the following week.

== International career ==
At the youth level, Regulus played with the Guadeloupe U20s team at the 2018 CONCACAF U-20 Championship.

He made his senior international debut on 16 December 2019 in a friendly against the Dominican Republic team, conceding a late penalty in the 1–0 defeat. Team manager Jocelyn Angloma had seen him play with Stade Lamentinois and called him to offer him the starting spot after an ankle injury sidelined regular starter Frédéric Tejou.

== Career statistics ==
=== Club ===
As of 29 October 2020.

Club	Season	League			Cup		Continental		Other		Total	
Club	Season	Division	Apps	Goals	Apps	Goals	Apps	Goals	Apps	Goals	Apps	Goals
JA Drancy	2019–20	Championnat National 2	14	0	0	0	–		0	0	14	0
JA Drancy	2020–21	Championnat National 3	6	0	0	0	–		0	0	6	0
Career total			20	0	0	0	0	0	0	0	20	0

=== International ===
As of match played 29 October 2020

National team	Year	Apps	Goals
Guadeloupe
Guadeloupe	2019	1	0
Total		1	0
