= Little Bay, Sint Maarten =

Coastal pond in Sint Maarten

Coordinates: 18°01′21″N 63°03′46″W

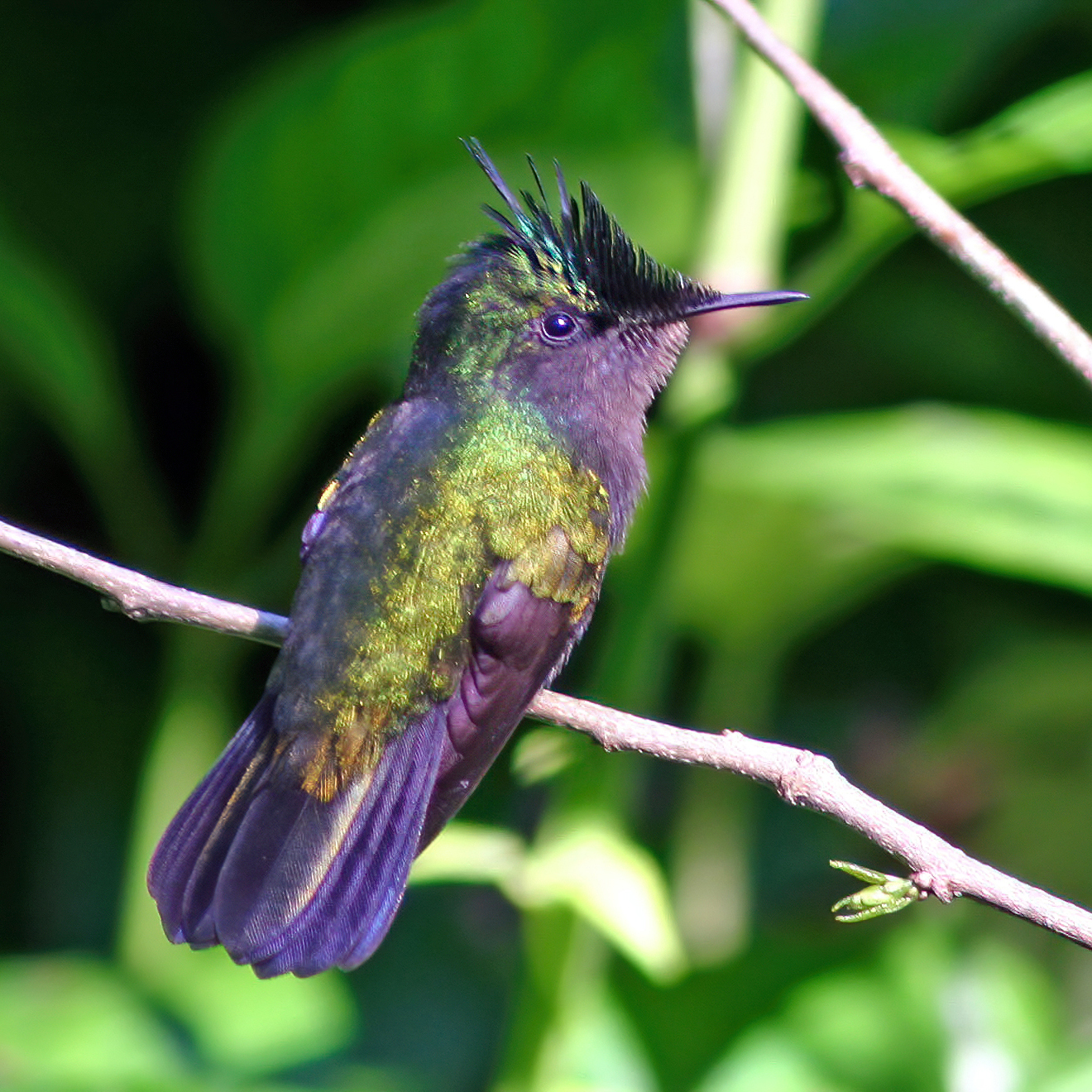
Antillean crested hummingbirds live in the IBA

Little Bay is an 8-hectare (20-acre) coastal pond in the country of Sint Maarten on the island of Saint Martin in the Dutch Caribbean. It has a low salinity (4 to 8 parts per thousand) and lies near the capital, Philipsburg. It has been identified as an Important Bird Area by BirdLife International because it supports threatened or restricted-range bird species. Birds for which the IBA was designated include green-throated caribs, Antillean crested hummingbirds, Caribbean elaenias, pearly-eyed thrashers and lesser Antillean bullfinches. Pied-billed grebes, common moorhens, American coots, white-cheeked pintails and ruddy ducks have been recorded nesting at the site.
