= FC Soualiga =

FC Soualiga is a professional football club based in Philipsburg, Sint Maarten. Its men's team competes in the Sint Maarten Premier League. It also has a women's team.
