= Reggae Lions =

Reggae Lions are a Maartener professional football club based in Philipsburg.

Reggae Lions won its first domestic title in the 2016–17 SMSA Senior League.

== Honors ==
- SMSA Senior League

Champions: (1) 2016–17
