= Sint Maarten Premier League =

- Founded: 1975
- First season: 1975–76
- Country: (Sint Maarten) Sint Maarten
- Confederation: CONCACAF
- Number of clubs: 10
- Level on pyramid: 1
- International cup: CFU Club Shield
- Current champions: SCSA Eagles (5th title) (2024–25)
- Most championships: C&D Connection, SCSA Eagles (4 titles Each)
- Current: 2025–26 Sint Maarten Senior League

Sint Maarten Premier League is the top association football league in Sint Maarten.

== Previous winners ==
- 1975–76: Politie Sport Vereniging
- 2001: Sporting Club
- 2002: Victory Boys
- 2004: Juventus
- 2005: C&D Connection
- 2005–06: C&D Connection
- 2006–07: C&D Connection
- 2015: Flames United SC
- 2016–17: Reggae Lions
- 2018-19: C&D Connection
- 2020–21: Flames United SC
- 2021–22: SCSA Eagles
- 2022–23: SCSA Eagles
- 2023–24: SCSA Eagles
- 2024–25: SCSA Eagles
- 2025–26: SCSA Eagles

== Teams ==
- C&D Connection
- Reggae Lions
- Soualiga
- Hottspurs
- Flames United
- SXM Crew
- 758 Boyz (founded 2017)
- Belvedere FC
- United Superstars
- SCSA Eagles
- Funmakers F.C.

== Top scorers ==
Season	Player	Team	Goals
2016-17	(Sint Maarten) Edemar La Cruz	Funmakers	15
2017-18	(Sint Maarten) Jaeremi Drijvers		
2023-24	(Sint Maarten) Khalid Tavernier	SCSA	15
2023-24	(Sint Maarten) Timon van Duijn	Eagles	15
2024–25	(Sint Maarten) Timon van Duijn	Eagles	23

=== Multiple hat-tricks ===
Rank	Country	Player	Hat-tricks
1	(Sint Maarten)	Jaeremi Drijvers	2
1	(Sint Maarten)	Edemar La Cruz	2
3	(Samoa)	Potmis Brandon	1
3	(Sint Maarten)	Willy Elien	1
3	(Sint Maarten)	Romario Hutchinson	1
3	(Sint Maarten)	Saintil Junior	1
3	(Sint Maarten)	Samer Laura	1
