= Flames United SC =

- Full name: Flames United Sports Club
- Founded: January 2010; 16 years ago
- Ground: Raoul Illidge Sports Complex; Philipsburg, Sint Maarten
- Capacity: 3,000
- Chairman: Dwayne Wright
- Manager: Omar Hunter
- League: Sint Maarten Premier League

Flames United SC is a Sint Maarten professional football club that currently plays in the Sint Maarten Premier League. The club's home ground is the Raoul Illidge Sports Complex in Philipsburg, the country's capital. The club also fields a futsal team.

== History ==
Flames United Sports Club was founded in January 2010. The team won its first league championship in 2015. The club also finished the Excellence Division, a competition between the top teams from the islands of Sint Maarten, Saint Martin and St. Barths, as champions in 2013 and runners-up in 2012.

In January 2016 it was announced that the Flames United squad would play as the Sint Maarten national football team during 2017 Caribbean Cup qualification after winning the league championship for the recently concluded season. However, shortly thereafter it was reported that the previous report was inaccurate and that Flames United would actually be competing in CFU Club Championship for the first time.

The club participated in the 2017 CFU Club Championship. They were drawn into Group E with all matches being played at Victoria Park in Kingstown, Saint Vincent and the Grenadines. They were eliminated from contention following two defeats in which they conceded nine goals per match. Yonel Martin and Rosshawn Haird scored the club's first-ever goals in the competition in the team's 2–9 defeat to System 3 FC of Saint Vincent and the Grenadines.

== Achievements ==
- SMSA Senior League champions (2): 2014–15, 2020–21
- Excellence Division champions (1): 2013
- Excellence Division runners-Up (1): 2012

== CFU Club Championship ==
Results list Flames United SC's goal tally first.

Competition	Round	Date	Club	Score
2017 CFU Club Championship	Group stage	8 March 2017	(Trinidad and Tobago) San Juan Jabloteh	0–9
2017 CFU Club Championship	Group stage	10 March 2017	(Saint Vincent and the Grenadines) System 3	2–9
2017 CFU Club Championship	Group stage	12 March 2017	(Guadeloupe) CS Moulien	0–8
2021 Caribbean Club Championship	Group Stage	15 May 2021	(Dominican Republic) O&M FC	1–11
2021 Caribbean Club Championship	Group Stage	17 May 2021	(Suriname) Inter Moengotapoe	0–12
