= Philipsburg, Sint Maarten =

Place in Sint Maarten, Kingdom of the Netherlands

Philipsburg
- Town
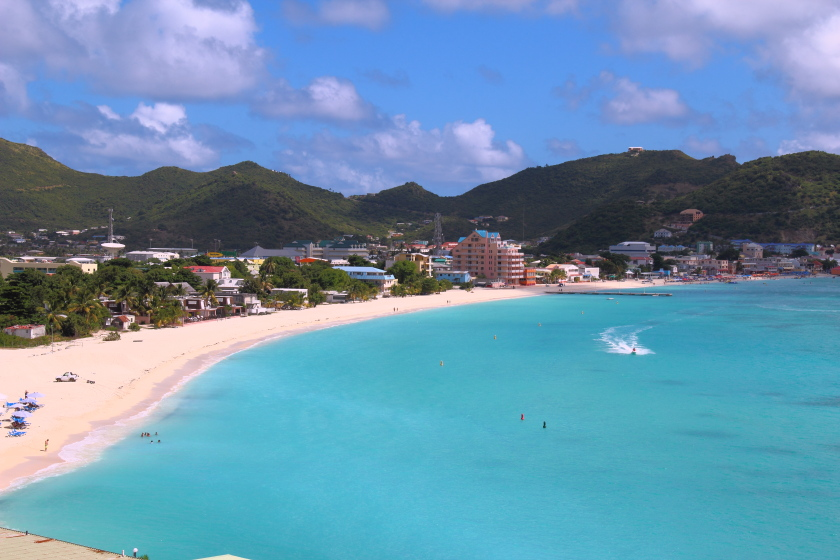
- View of Great Bay towards Philipsburg

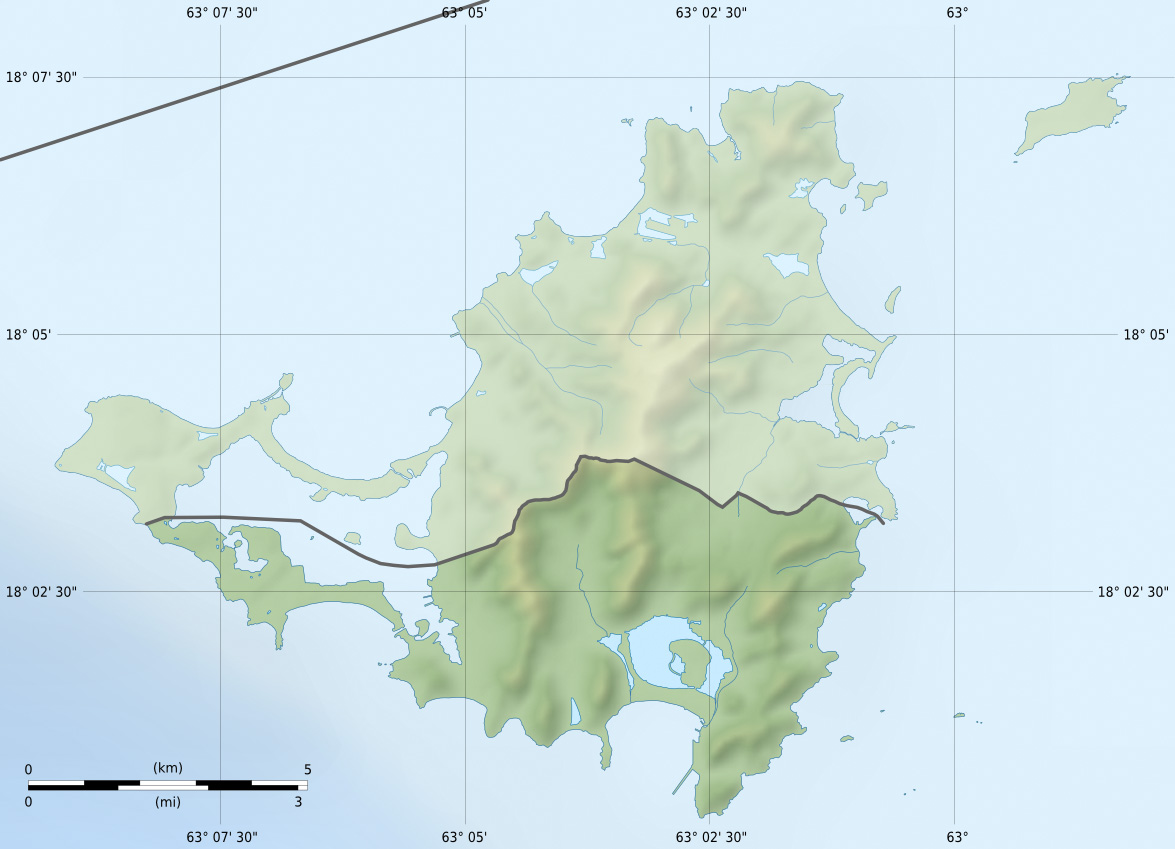
- Location in Sint Maarten Philipsburg (the Caribbean)
- Coordinates: 18.0237°N 63.0458°W
- Country: Netherlands
- Constituent: Sint Maarten
- Island: Saint Martin
- Columbus landed: 11 November 1493
- Established: 1763 (by John Philips)

Population (2017)
  - Total: 1,894
- Time zone: UTC−4 (AST)
- Climate: Aw

Philipsburg (Dutch pronunciation: [ˈfilɪpsˌbʏr(ə)x]) is the main town and capital of Sint Maarten, a constituent country of the Kingdom of the Netherlands. It is located on the southern coast of Saint Martin island, between Great Bay and the Great Salt Pond. It serves as the main port of entry, with the major airport and port located in the vicinity. Tourism is the main economic activity, supported by extensive lodgings and cultural activities. As of 2017, the town had 1,894 inhabitants.

== Geography ==
Philipsburg is the main town and capital of Sint Maarten, a constituent country of the Kingdom of the Netherlands. It is located on the southern coast of Saint Martin island, between Great Bay and the Great Salt Pond. It was founded around 1733 by Scotsman John Philips (from Arbroath, Scotland) to centralize trade in the islands. Two forts, Fort Amsterdam and Fort Willem were built in the 17th and 18th century.

=== Climate ===
Philipsburg has a tropical savanna climate (Köppen Aw), and is drier than most parts of the northeastern Caribbean due to a rain shadow from the island's mountains, drying the northeast trade winds. Due to its location in the Caribbean and the low lying coastal plains, the town regularly faces threats and devastation from hurricanes striking the coast, with extensive redevelopment.

Climate data for Saint Martin (Princess Juliana International Airport) (1991–2020 normals, extremes 1971–2020)
Month	Jan	Feb	Mar	Apr	May	Jun	Jul	Aug	Sep	Oct	Nov	Dec	Year
Record high °C (°F)	32.7 (90.9)	31.6 (88.9)	32.6 (90.7)	33.6 (92.5)	34.0 (93.2)	35.2 (95.4)	34.2 (93.6)	35.1 (95.2)	35.0 (95.0)	34.3 (93.7)	33.9 (93.0)	32.1 (89.8)	35.2 (95.4)
Mean daily maximum °C (°F)	28.6 (83.5)	28.7 (83.7)	29.0 (84.2)	29.6 (85.3)	30.4 (86.7)	31.3 (88.3)	31.5 (88.7)	31.8 (89.2)	31.7 (89.1)	31.2 (88.2)	30.3 (86.5)	29.3 (84.7)	30.3 (86.5)
Daily mean °C (°F)	25.7 (78.3)	25.6 (78.1)	25.8 (78.4)	26.6 (79.9)	27.5 (81.5)	28.4 (83.1)	28.6 (83.5)	28.8 (83.8)	28.8 (83.8)	28.3 (82.9)	27.4 (81.3)	26.4 (79.5)	27.3 (81.1)
Mean daily minimum °C (°F)	23.3 (73.9)	23.2 (73.8)	23.5 (74.3)	24.2 (75.6)	25.3 (77.5)	26.2 (79.2)	26.3 (79.3)	26.5 (79.7)	26.4 (79.5)	25.9 (78.6)	25.1 (77.2)	24.1 (75.4)	25.0 (77.0)
Record low °C (°F)	18.6 (65.5)	18.8 (65.8)	19.1 (66.4)	19.3 (66.7)	20.2 (68.4)	21.8 (71.2)	22.1 (71.8)	21.4 (70.5)	22.0 (71.6)	21.8 (71.2)	20.8 (69.4)	19.9 (67.8)	18.6 (65.5)
Average precipitation mm (inches)	67.9 (2.67)	49.4 (1.94)	46.9 (1.85)	60.1 (2.37)	98.0 (3.86)	55.0 (2.17)	96.6 (3.80)	106.2 (4.18)	116.1 (4.57)	157.0 (6.18)	162.0 (6.38)	101.0 (3.98)	1,116.2 (43.94)
Average precipitation days (≥ 1 mm)	13	11	8	8	10	9	13	14	13	14	14	14	141
Average relative humidity (%)	74.7	74.1	73.6	75.0	75.9	75.1	74.8	75.4	76.3	76.8	77.4	76.6	75.5
Mean monthly sunshine hours	258.1	245.2	274.8	269.9	253.7	245.8	259.1	267.5	245.1	249.2	238.4	247.1	3,053.9
Source 1: National Oceanic and Atmospheric Administration
Source 2: Meteorological Department Curaçao (humidity 1971–2000)

== Demographics and economy ==
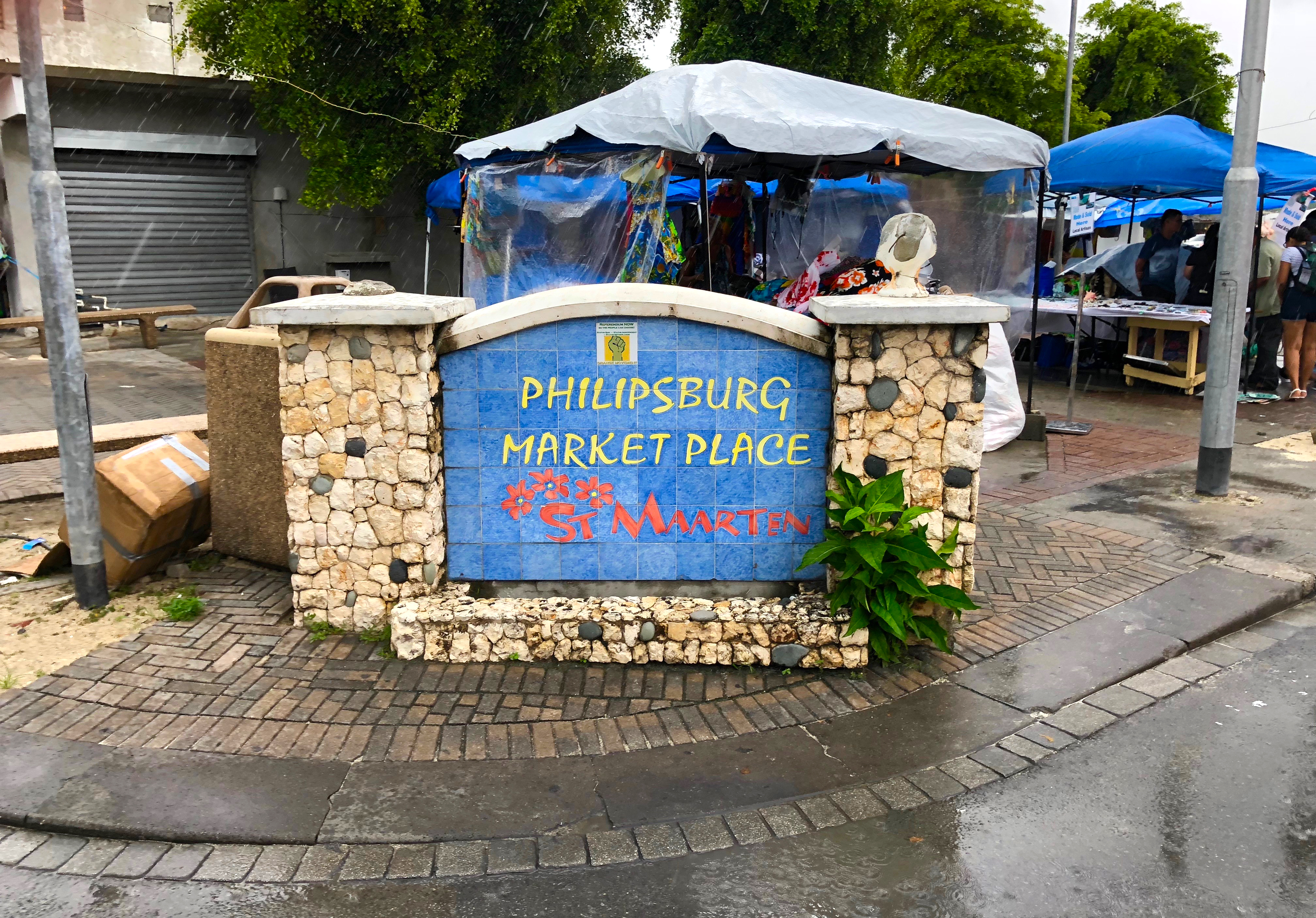
Philipsburg market

As of 2017, the town had 1,894 inhabitants. Tourism accounts for major part of the economy of the island, with Philipsburg at the center of it. The town serves as a major point of entry to the island. It hosts the island's main and only deep water shipping port, where cruise ships and yachts dock. The port is capable of handling six ships and serves more than two million passengers per year. The Princess Juliana International Airport is located to the west of Philipsburg, and serves the town. The town has colourful buildings, with lodgings, restaurants, and markets to cater to tourists. To serve its growing cruise clientele, a boardwalk was built in 2006 in between of the town and the beach. Cultural festivals like the Soul Beach Music festival are aimed at developing tourism. The town hosts many historic monuments and buildings such as St. Martin of Tours' Church, Foga Salt Factory, and official buildings such as the Rinkhouse and Courthouse. There are various schools, and a public library is in Philipsburg.

== See also ==
- List of Designated Monuments in Philipsburg
