= 2024 CONCACAF U-20 Championship squads =

Association football tournament

The 2024 CONCACAF U-20 Championship was an international football tournament held in Mexico from 19 July to 4 August 2024. The twelve participating national teams were required to register a squad of up to 21 players, of which three have to be goalkeepers. Only players in these squads were eligible to take part in the tournament. The tournament exclusively required players to be born between 1 January 2005 and 31 December 2009 to be eligible, that is, they must be a maximum of 19 years old and at least 16 years old by the end of the calendar year in which the competition is played.

Each national team had to submit a provisional list of a minimum of 21 and a maximum of 60 players (five of which had to be goalkeepers) to CONCACAF no later than thirty days prior to the start of the tournament. Players could be added or removed from the provisional list before the final list deadline. The final list of up to 21 players per national team had to be submitted to CONCACAF by 8 July 2024, ten days before the opening match of the tournament. All players in the final list had to be chosen from the respective provisional list. In the event that a player on the submitted final list suffered a serious injury or had medical reasons, he could be replaced up to 24 hours before the kick-off of his team's first match of the tournament, provided that it was approved by the CONCACAF Medical Committee. The replacement player had to come from the provisional list and would be assigned the shirt number of the replaced player.

CONCACAF published the final rosters on 12 July 2024.

The age listed for each player is on 19 July 2024, the first day of the tournament. A flag is included for coaches who are of a different nationality than their own national team.

== Group A ==
=== United States ===
United States announced their 21-man final squad on 12 July 2024.

Head coach: Michael Nsien

No.	Pos.	Player	Date of birth (age)	Club
1	GK	Julian Eyestone	21 April 2006 (aged 18)	(The Football Association) Brentford
2	DF	Aiden Harangi	8 February 2006 (aged 18)	(German Football Association) Eintracht Frankfurt
3	DF	Nolan Norris	17 February 2005 (aged 19)	(United States Soccer Federation) FC Dallas
4	DF	Noah Cobb	20 July 2005 (aged 18)	(United States Soccer Federation) Atlanta United FC
5	DF	Stuart Hawkins	18 September 2006 (aged 17)	(United States Soccer Federation) Seattle Sounders FC
6	MF	Pedro Soma	30 June 2006 (aged 18)	(Royal Spanish Football Federation) Cornellà
7	FW	Nimfasha Berchimas	22 February 2008 (aged 16)	(United States Soccer Federation) Charlotte FC
8	MF	Brooklyn Raines	11 March 2005 (aged 19)	(United States Soccer Federation) Houston Dynamo FC
9	FW	Marcos Zambrano	20 January 2005 (aged 19)	(Portuguese Football Federation) Vitória de Guimarães
10	MF	Niko Tsakiris	19 June 2005 (aged 19)	(United States Soccer Federation) San Jose Earthquakes
11	FW	David Vazquez	22 February 2006 (aged 18)	(United States Soccer Federation) Philadelphia Union
12	GK	Adam Beaudry	18 April 2006 (aged 18)	(United States Soccer Federation) Colorado Rapids
13	MF	Cruz Medina	24 September 2006 (aged 17)	(United States Soccer Federation) San Jose Earthquakes
14	MF	Taha Habroune	5 February 2006 (aged 18)	(United States Soccer Federation) Columbus Crew
15	DF	Luca Bombino	10 July 2006 (aged 18)	(United States Soccer Federation) Los Angeles FC
16	DF	Ethan Kohler	20 May 2005 (aged 19)	(German Football Association) Werder Bremen
17	FW	Keyrol Figueroa	31 August 2006 (aged 17)	(The Football Association) Liverpool
18	FW	Zavier Gozo	22 March 2007 (aged 17)	(United States Soccer Federation) Real Salt Lake
19	MF	Sergio Oregel	16 May 2005 (aged 19)	(United States Soccer Federation) Chicago Fire FC
20	FW	Ruben Ramos Jr	22 January 2007 (aged 17)	(United States Soccer Federation) LA Galaxy
21	GK	Duran Ferree	28 September 2006 (aged 17)	(United States Soccer Federation) Orange County SC

=== Costa Rica ===
Costa Rica announced their 21-man final squad on 10 July 2024.

Head coach: (Argentina) Cristian Vella

No.	Pos.	Player	Date of birth (age)	Club
1	GK	Berny Rojas	13 August 2006 (aged 17)	(Costa Rican Football Federation) Saprissa
2	DF	Kenan Myrie	6 September 2006 (aged 17)	(Costa Rican Football Federation) Saprissa
3	DF	Alejandro Arenas	20 May 2005 (aged 19)	(Costa Rican Football Federation) Alajuelense
4	DF	Farbod Samadian	6 February 2005 (aged 19)	(Costa Rican Football Federation) Alajuelense
5	MF	Alberth Barahona	31 March 2005 (aged 19)	(Costa Rican Football Federation) Saprissa
6	DF	Andry Naranjo	7 October 2006 (aged 17)	(Costa Rican Football Federation) Jicaral
7	FW	Jorge Morejón	2 February 2007 (aged 17)	(Costa Rican Football Federation) Alajuelense
8	MF	Bryson Rodríguez	29 July 2005 (aged 18)	(Costa Rican Football Federation) Liberia
9	FW	Esteban Cruz	16 February 2005 (aged 19)	(Costa Rican Football Federation) Alajuelense
10	MF	Claudio Montero	14 April 2006 (aged 18)	(Costa Rican Football Federation) Alajuelense
11	FW	Andy Rojas	5 December 2005 (aged 18)	(Costa Rican Football Federation) Herediano
12	DF	Julián González	27 January 2005 (aged 19)	(Costa Rican Football Federation) Saprissa
13	GK	Sebastián Quesada	8 March 2006 (aged 18)	(Costa Rican Football Federation) Sporting
14	MF	Dylan Masís	11 May 2005 (aged 19)	(Costa Rican Football Federation) Saprissa
15	MF	Deylan Aguilar	6 January 2007 (aged 17)	(Costa Rican Football Federation) Alajuelense
16	DF	Walter Ramírez	19 January 2007 (aged 17)	(Costa Rican Football Federation) Alajuelense
17	FW	Dylan Ramírez	5 January 2005 (aged 19)	(Costa Rican Football Federation) Sporting
18	GK	Marcelo Lacayo	22 July 2006 (aged 17)	(Costa Rican Football Federation) Belén
19	MF	Leonardo Alfaro	31 January 2007 (aged 17)	(Costa Rican Football Federation) Cartaginés
20	MF	Pablo Agüero	28 March 2005 (aged 19)	(Costa Rican Football Federation) Sporting
21	FW	Matías Wanchope	31 August 2007 (aged 16)	(United States Soccer Federation) Los Angeles FC Academy

=== Cuba ===
Cuba's final 21-man squad was announced by CONCACAF on 12 July 2024.

Head coach: Yunielys Castillo

No.	Pos.	Player	Date of birth (age)	Club
1	GK	Yorlan Urgelles	23 February 2005 (aged 19)	(Football Association of Cuba) Guantánamo
2	DF	Elvis Casanova	17 September 2005 (aged 18)	(Football Association of Cuba) Villa Clara
3	DF	Ricardo Polo	14 May 2005 (aged 19)	(Football Association of Cuba) Las Tunas
4	MF	Walberto León	21 March 2005 (aged 19)	(Football Association of Cuba) Las Tunas
5	DF	Karel Pérez	25 August 2005 (aged 18)	(Costa Rican Football Federation) Alajuelense
6	MF	Marcos Campos	15 November 2005 (aged 18)	(Football Association of Cuba) Holguín
7	FW	Aniel Casanova	17 September 2005 (aged 18)	(Football Association of Cuba) Villa Clara
8	DF	Leandro Mena	3 February 2005 (aged 19)	(Football Association of Cuba) Santiago de Cuba
9	FW	David Pérez	4 April 2005 (aged 19)	(Football Association of Cuba) La Habana
10	MF	Michael Camejo	17 March 2005 (aged 19)	(Football Association of Cuba) La Habana
11	DF	Romario Torres	9 February 2005 (aged 19)	(Uruguayan Football Association) Nacional
12	GK	Yurdy Hodelin	23 September 2005 (aged 18)	(Football Association of Cuba) Guantánamo
13	FW	Didier Reinoso	31 March 2007 (aged 17)	(Football Association of Cuba) La Habana
14	MF	Maikol Vega	12 September 2006 (aged 17)	(Football Association of Cuba) La Habana
15	FW	Jade Quiñones	23 September 2007 (aged 16)	(Football Association of Cuba) La Habana
16	DF	Norlys Chávez	28 June 2005 (aged 19)	(Football Association of Cuba) Matanzas
17	FW	Cristian Mendoza	20 August 2005 (aged 18)	(Football Association of Cuba) Granma
18	FW	Yordan Castañer	23 February 2005 (aged 19)	(Football Association of Cuba) La Habana
19	FW	Enmanuel Torres	10 February 2005 (aged 19)	(Football Association of Cuba) Santiago de Cuba
20	MF	Samuel Rodríguez	25 January 2005 (aged 19)	(Football Association of Cuba) Sancti Spíritus
21	GK	Yurixander Zayas	3 May 2007 (aged 17)	(Football Association of Cuba) Ciego de Ávila

=== Jamaica ===
Jamaica announced their 21-man final squad on 13 July 2024.

Head coach: (Sweden) John Wall

No.	Pos.	Player	Date of birth (age)	Club
1	GK	Joshua Grant	27 May 2007 (aged 17)	(United States Soccer Federation) New York Red Bulls
2	DF	Javin Williams	12 December 2006 (aged 17)	(Jamaica Football Federation) Reno
3	DF	Nahshon Bolt-Barrett	19 May 2006 (aged 18)	(Jamaica Football Federation) Arnett Gardens
4	DF	Romain Blake	24 July 2005 (aged 18)	(United States Soccer Federation) Chicago Fire FC
5	DF	Adrian Reid Jr	5 September 2006 (aged 17)	(Jamaica Football Federation) Cavalier
6	DF	Rashaun Small	23 January 2005 (aged 19)	(Jamaica Football Federation) Portmore United
7	FW	Dunsting Cohen	22 December 2006 (aged 17)	(Jamaica Football Federation) Vere United
8	MF	Makai Welch	4 October 2005 (aged 18)	(The Football Association) Leyton Orient
9	MF	Fabian Reynolds	6 April 2006 (aged 18)	(The Football Association) Wolverhampton Wanderers
10	FW	Orane Watson	11 November 2006 (aged 17)	(Jamaica Football Federation) Chapelton Maroons
11	FW	Nashordo Gibbs	14 April 2006 (aged 18)	(Jamaica Football Federation) Real Mona
12	MF	Shadeko Wizzard	14 October 2005 (aged 18)	(Jamaica Football Federation) Arnett Gardens
13	GK	Taywane Lynch	19 January 2006 (aged 18)	(Jamaica Football Federation) Mount Pleasant
14	FW	Ashton Gordon	14 April 2007 (aged 17)	(United States Soccer Federation) Atlanta United FC
15	DF	Jloyd Smith	22 March 2006 (aged 18)	(Jamaica Football Federation) Cavalier
16	MF	Brian Burkett	22 July 2005 (aged 18)	(Jamaica Football Federation) Dunbeholden
17	MF	Alexander Bicknell	14 February 2005 (aged 19)	(Portuguese Football Federation) Leixões
18	MF	Avery Grange	29 December 2005 (aged 18)	(Canadian Soccer Association) The Borough FC
19	MF	Christopher Ainsworth	31 August 2005 (aged 18)	(Jamaica Football Federation) Cavalier
20	FW	Nyle Waugh	18 October 2006 (aged 17)	(United States Soccer Federation) FC Dallas
21	GK	Alex James	27 October 2006 (aged 17)	(Jamaica Football Federation) Real Mona

== Group B ==
=== Honduras ===
Honduras announced their 21-man final squad on 11 July 2024.

Head coach: Emilson Soto

No.	Pos.	Player	Date of birth (age)	Club
1	GK	Daniel Paguada	10 October 2005 (aged 18)	(National Autonomous Federation of Football of Honduras) Motagua
2	DF	Daylor Cacho	30 July 2006 (aged 17)	(National Autonomous Federation of Football of Honduras) Real España
3	DF	Jeffrey Ramos	29 May 2007 (aged 17)	(National Autonomous Federation of Football of Honduras) Real Sociedad
4	DF	Anfronit Tatum	2 June 2005 (aged 19)	(National Autonomous Federation of Football of Honduras) Real España
5	MF	Jordan García	31 March 2006 (aged 18)	(National Autonomous Federation of Football of Honduras) Motagua
6	DF	David Herrera	15 January 2006 (aged 18)	(National Autonomous Federation of Football of Honduras) Olimpia
7	MF	Justin Ponce	23 November 2005 (aged 18)	(National Autonomous Federation of Football of Honduras) UPNFM
8	MF	Jeferson Castillo	14 June 2005 (aged 19)	(National Autonomous Federation of Football of Honduras) Olimpia
9	FW	Ángel Villatoro	15 September 2005 (aged 18)	(National Autonomous Federation of Football of Honduras) Olancho
10	MF	Roberto Osorto	18 January 2006 (aged 18)	(National Autonomous Federation of Football of Honduras) Real España
11	FW	Dereck Moncada	30 November 2007 (aged 16)	(National Autonomous Federation of Football of Honduras) Olimpia
12	GK	Rodbin Mejía	11 October 2006 (aged 17)	(National Autonomous Federation of Football of Honduras) Olimpia
13	DF	Jefry Martínez	30 July 2005 (aged 18)	(National Autonomous Federation of Football of Honduras) Social Sol
14	DF	Cristofer Cubas	9 June 2005 (aged 19)	(National Autonomous Federation of Football of Honduras) Olancho
15	MF	Didier Paguada	3 August 2005 (aged 18)	(National Autonomous Federation of Football of Honduras) Olimpia
16	MF	Huber Lagos	2 March 2005 (aged 19)	(National Autonomous Federation of Football of Honduras) AFFI Academia
17	MF	Nixon Cruz	3 August 2006 (aged 17)	(National Autonomous Federation of Football of Honduras) Honduras Progreso
18	MF	Babington López	7 June 2005 (aged 19)	(National Autonomous Federation of Football of Honduras) UPNFM
19	FW	Matias Vazquez	15 December 2006 (aged 17)	(National Autonomous Federation of Football of Honduras) Motagua
20	MF	Jonathan Bueso	17 August 2006 (aged 17)	(National Autonomous Federation of Football of Honduras) Marathón
21	GK	Eliezer Fuentes	3 June 2008 (aged 16)	(United States Soccer Federation) FC Dallas

=== Dominican Republic ===
Dominican Republic announced a reduced provisional list of 25 players on 2 July 2024. The 21-man final squad was announced on 12 July 2024.

Head coach: (Argentina) Alejandro Trionfini

No.	Pos.	Player	Date of birth (age)	Club
1	GK	Edwin Frías	18 May 2006 (aged 18)	(Dominican Football Federation) Cibao
2	DF	Marlon Mena	5 October 2006 (aged 17)	(Italian Football Federation) Parma
3	DF	José Conesa	25 January 2005 (aged 19)	(Royal Spanish Football Federation) UCAM Murcia
4	DF	David Royo	13 March 2006 (aged 18)	(Royal Spanish Football Federation) Cornellà
5	DF	Maximiliano Jerez	24 August 2005 (aged 18)	(Dominican Football Federation) Delfines del Este
6	DF	Israel Boatwright	2 June 2005 (aged 19)	(United States Soccer Federation) Inter Miami CF
7	FW	Carlos Arias	19 August 2005 (aged 18)	(Royal Spanish Football Federation) Rayo Ciudad Alcobendas
8	MF	Lucas Bretón	20 November 2006 (aged 17)	(Dominican Football Federation) Cibao
9	FW	Cristian Ortiz	23 April 2007 (aged 17)	(United States Soccer Federation) Tampa Bay Rowdies
10	MF	Ayden Kokoszka	6 August 2006 (aged 17)	(United States Soccer Federation) New England Revolution
11	FW	Elian Concepción	4 April 2005 (aged 19)	(Royal Spanish Football Federation) Girona
12	GK	Eduardo Tiburcio	18 February 2006 (aged 18)	(Dominican Football Federation) Moca
13	DF	Ysaac Corcino	12 August 2005 (aged 18)	(Dominican Football Federation) Atlético Pantoja
14	MF	Yordy Álvarez	3 December 2005 (aged 18)	(Dominican Football Federation) Atlántico
15	DF	Bryan Polanco	9 September 2005 (aged 18)	(Italian Football Federation) Cavese
16	MF	Nicolás Cruz	14 February 2006 (aged 18)	(Royal Spanish Football Federation) CF Damm
17	MF	Javier Roces	10 September 2005 (aged 18)	(Dominican Football Federation) Cibao
18	FW	Alan Martínez	2 October 2006 (aged 17)	(Dominican Football Federation) Delfines del Este
19	MF	Aidan Russell	13 May 2006 (aged 18)	(Football Association of Ireland) Dundalk
20	GK	César Geraldino	12 January 2006 (aged 18)	(Dominican Football Federation) América SD
21	FW	Abraham Mejía	8 July 2006 (aged 18)	(Dominican Football Federation) Santa Fe

=== El Salvador ===
El Salvador's final 21-man squad was announced by CONCACAF on 12 July 2024, and then by the Salvadoran Football Federation on 15 July 2024.

Head coach: (Spain) Juan Cortés

No.	Pos.	Player	Date of birth (age)	Club
1	GK	Daniel Franco	10 October 2006 (aged 17)	(Salvadoran Football Federation) Alianza
2	DF	Justin Carrillo	13 February 2005 (aged 19)	(Costa Rican Football Federation) Cartaginés
3	DF	Kiano Falcao	11 April 2006 (aged 18)	(United States Soccer Federation) FC Cincinnati
4	DF	Darwin Lopez	3 June 2006 (aged 18)	(United States Soccer Federation) LA Surf
5	DF	Néstor Delgado	31 January 2006 (aged 18)	(Salvadoran Football Federation) Once Deportivo
6	MF	Christopher Guardado	30 October 2006 (aged 17)	(Salvadoran Football Federation) Isidro Metapán
7	MF	Nelson Díaz	4 July 2006 (aged 18)	(Salvadoran Football Federation) Brasilia
8	MF	Walter Menjívar	1 June 2006 (aged 18)	(Salvadoran Football Federation) Atlético Comalapa
9	FW	Francis Castillo	7 November 2005 (aged 18)	(Royal Spanish Football Federation) Cádiz
10	MF	Steven Guerra	12 June 2005 (aged 19)	(Salvadoran Football Federation) Isidro Metapán
11	MF	Franklin Peña	10 April 2005 (aged 19)	(Salvadoran Football Federation) Platense
12	MF	Bryan Lovo	19 November 2005 (aged 18)	(Salvadoran Football Federation) Cacahuatique
13	FW	Michael Rodríguez	4 February 2005 (aged 19)	(Costa Rican Football Federation) Guanacasteca
14	FW	Víctor Mejía	24 March 2005 (aged 19)	(Salvadoran Football Federation) Once Lobos
15	FW	Christopher Argueta	14 January 2007 (aged 17)	(United States Soccer Federation) DC United
16	DF	Diego Guardado	29 January 2005 (aged 19)	(German Football Association) Schalke 04
17	MF	Bryan Vásquez	12 June 2006 (aged 18)	(United States Soccer Federation) FC Cincinnati
18	GK	Alejandro Casco	27 October 2005 (aged 18)	(Salvadoran Football Federation) Atlético Comalapa
19	FW	Wilber Díaz	16 May 2007 (aged 17)	(Salvadoran Football Federation) Santa Tecla
20	DF	David Montejo	13 January 2006 (aged 18)	(Salvadoran Football Federation) Platense
21	GK	Nathan Gutierrez	15 June 2005 (aged 19)	(United States Soccer Federation) Boston United

=== Canada ===
Canada announced their 21-man final squad on 11 July 2024.

Head coach: Andrew Olivieri

No.	Pos.	Player	Date of birth (age)	Club
1	GK	Grégoire Swiderski	5 October 2005 (aged 18)	(French Football Federation) Bordeaux II
2	DF	Theo Rigopoulos	29 October 2006 (aged 17)	(Canadian Soccer Association) Toronto FC Academy
3	DF	Christian Greco-Taylor	20 February 2005 (aged 19)	(Canadian Soccer Association) Pacific FC
4	MF	Alessandro Biello	7 April 2006 (aged 18)	(Canadian Soccer Association) CF Montréal
5	DF	Adam Pearlman	5 April 2005 (aged 19)	(Canadian Soccer Association) Toronto FC
6	MF	Khadim Kane	17 May 2005 (aged 19)	(Canadian Soccer Association) Forge FC
7	FW	Santiago López	10 June 2005 (aged 19)	(Mexican Football Federation) UNAM
8	MF	Jeevan Badwal	11 March 2006 (aged 18)	(Canadian Soccer Association) Whitecaps FC 2
9	FW	Myles Morgan	20 June 2005 (aged 19)	(Canadian Soccer Association) Whitecaps FC 2
10	MF	Jesse Costa	28 April 2005 (aged 19)	(German Football Association) VfL Wolfsburg
11	FW	Kimani Stewart-Baynes	17 January 2005 (aged 19)	(United States Soccer Federation) Colorado Rapids
12	DF	James Cameron	24 January 2005 (aged 19)	(Canadian Soccer Association) Vancouver FC
13	DF	Richard Chukwu	25 February 2008 (aged 16)	(Canadian Soccer Association) Toronto FC Academy
14	DF	Ethan Schilte-Brown	1 June 2005 (aged 19)	(Scottish Football Association) Kilmarnock B
15	FW	Oumar Diallo	27 February 2005 (aged 19)	(Austrian Football Association) LASK
16	GK	Isaiah Goldson	21 August 2005 (aged 18)	(United States Soccer Federation) Michigan Wolverines
17	FW	Mataeo Bunbury	13 June 2005 (aged 19)	(United States Soccer Federation) Portland Timbers 2
18	GK	Nathaniel Abraham	23 April 2007 (aged 17)	(Canadian Soccer Association) Toronto FC Academy
19	FW	Tavio Ciccarelli	24 July 2006 (aged 17)	(Canadian Soccer Association) Halifax Wanderers FC
20	MF	Andrei Dumitru	28 October 2006 (aged 17)	(Canadian Soccer Association) Toronto FC II
21	DF	Immanuel Mathe	27 January 2006 (aged 18)	(Canadian Soccer Association) Whitecaps FC 2

== Group C ==
=== Mexico ===
Mexico announced their 21-man final squad on 20 June 2024.

Head coach: Eduardo Arce

No.	Pos.	Player	Date of birth (age)	Club
1	GK	Emmanuel Ochoa	5 May 2005 (aged 19)	(United States Soccer Federation) San Jose Earthquakes
2	DF	Francisco Méndez	4 May 2005 (aged 19)	(Mexican Football Federation) Guadalajara
3	DF	Rodrigo Pachuca	24 July 2005 (aged 18)	(Mexican Football Federation) Puebla
4	DF	Diego Ochoa	20 April 2005 (aged 19)	(Mexican Football Federation) Guadalajara
5	DF	César Bustos	27 August 2005 (aged 18)	(Mexican Football Federation) Monterrey
6	MF	César Garza	1 July 2005 (aged 19)	(Mexican Football Federation) Monterrey
7	FW	Alexéi Domínguez	3 January 2005 (aged 19)	(Mexican Football Federation) Pachuca
8	MF	Elías Montiel	7 October 2005 (aged 18)	(Mexican Football Federation) Pachuca
9	FW	Stephano Carrillo	7 March 2006 (aged 18)	(Mexican Football Federation) Santos Laguna
10	MF	Yael Padilla	19 December 2005 (aged 18)	(Mexican Football Federation) Guadalajara
11	MF	Heriberto Jurado	3 January 2005 (aged 19)	(Mexican Football Federation) Necaxa
12	GK	Pablo Lara	29 June 2005 (aged 19)	(Mexican Football Federation) UNAM
14	MF	Amaury Morales	3 December 2005 (aged 18)	(Mexican Football Federation) Cruz Azul
15	DF	Ricardo Juárez	3 September 2005 (aged 18)	(Mexican Football Federation) Juárez
16	MF	Brandon Téllez	17 February 2005 (aged 19)	(Mexican Football Federation) Tapatío
13	FW	Jonantan Villal	6 January 2005 (aged 19)	(Mexican Football Federation) Atlético San Luis
17	MF	Diego Sánchez	12 April 2005 (aged 19)	(Mexican Football Federation) UANL
18	DF	Ari Contreras	2 November 2005 (aged 18)	(Mexican Football Federation) Pachuca
19	FW	Mateo Levy	22 October 2006 (aged 17)	(Mexican Football Federation) Cruz Azul
20	MF	Xavier Biscayzacú	3 December 2005 (aged 18)	(Uruguayan Football Association) Defensor Sporting
21	GK	Javier Orantes	22 June 2005 (aged 19)	(Mexican Football Federation) Necaxa

=== Panama ===
Panama announced a reduced provisional list of 24 players on 4 July 2024. The final 21-man squad was announced on 12 July 2024.

Head coach: Jorge Dely Valdés

No.	Pos.	Player	Date of birth (age)	Club
1	GK	Ian Flores	20 March 2005 (aged 19)	(Panamanian Football Federation) San Francisco
2	DF	Jhoamir Hill	3 March 2005 (aged 19)	(Panamanian Football Federation) Águilas de la U
3	DF	Julio Rodríguez	9 March 2005 (aged 19)	(Panamanian Football Federation) Plaza Amador
4	DF	Érick Díaz	4 March 2006 (aged 18)	(Panamanian Football Federation) Tauro
5	DF	Ariel Arroyo	23 January 2005 (aged 19)	(Panamanian Football Federation) Árabe Unido
6	MF	Blas Pérez	21 January 2005 (aged 19)	(Panamanian Football Federation) Tauro
7	MF	Kairo Walters	30 April 2005 (aged 19)	(Panamanian Football Federation) Potros del Este
8	MF	Anel Ryce	6 July 2006 (aged 18)	(Panamanian Football Federation) Plaza Amador
9	FW	Gustavo Herrera	18 November 2005 (aged 18)	(Panamanian Football Federation) Sporting San Miguelito
10	MF	Giovany Herbert	12 March 2005 (aged 19)	(Panamanian Football Federation) Árabe Unido
11	MF	Virgilio Escala	3 August 2005 (aged 18)	(Panamanian Football Federation) San Francisco
12	GK	Cecilio Burgess	21 October 2005 (aged 18)	(Panamanian Football Federation) UMECIT
13	DF	Martín Krug	9 July 2006 (aged 18)	(Royal Spanish Football Federation) Atlético Levante
14	DF	Juan Carlos Hall	9 March 2006 (aged 18)	(Panamanian Football Federation) Herrera
15	MF	Joseph Jones	30 July 2005 (aged 18)	(Panamanian Football Federation) Plaza Amador
16	DF	Aimar Modelo	25 January 2005 (aged 19)	(Panamanian Football Federation) Independiente
17	MF	Carlos Hernández	7 May 2005 (aged 19)	(Panamanian Football Federation) Independiente
18	MF	Allan Saldaña	18 July 2006 (aged 18)	(Panamanian Football Federation) Universitario
19	FW	Rafael Mosquera	24 May 2005 (aged 19)	(United States Soccer Federation) New York Red Bulls II
20	DF	Antony Herbert	12 March 2005 (aged 19)	(Panamanian Football Federation) Árabe Unido
21	GK	Sean Deane	14 April 2005 (aged 19)	(Panamanian Football Federation) Panama City

=== Guatemala ===
Guatemala's final 21-man squad was announced by CONCACAF on 12 July 2024, and then by the National Football Federation of Guatemala on 18 July 2024.

Head coach: (Mexico) Marvin Cabrera

No.	Pos.	Player	Date of birth (age)	Club
1	GK	Fausto Delgado	17 September 2005 (aged 18)	(United States Soccer Federation) Hoosac School
2	DF	Christopher Maldonado	15 September 2005 (aged 18)	(United States Soccer Federation) San Francisco Dons
3	DF	Gabriel Cabrera	26 July 2005 (aged 18)	(National Football Federation of Guatemala) Amatitlán
4	DF	Héctor Prillwitz	29 March 2006 (aged 18)	(National Football Federation of Guatemala) Antigua
5	DF	Arian Recinos	3 February 2005 (aged 19)	(United States Soccer Federation) New York Red Bulls II
6	MF	Decarlo Guerra	1 February 2008 (aged 16)	(United States Soccer Federation) Los Angeles FC
7	MF	Matt Evans	25 May 2006 (aged 18)	(United States Soccer Federation) Los Angeles FC
8	MF	Antony Recinos	7 April 2006 (aged 18)	(United States Soccer Federation) FC Westchester
9	FW	Axel de la Cruz	5 March 2006 (aged 18)	(National Football Federation of Guatemala) Comunicaciones
10	FW	Olger Escobar	11 September 2006 (aged 17)	(United States Soccer Federation) New England Revolution II
11	DF	Rudy Muñoz	6 February 2005 (aged 19)	(National Football Federation of Guatemala) Municipal
12	GK	Diego Bolaños	21 June 2006 (aged 18)	(Argentine Football Association) Argentinos Juniors
13	MF	Selvin Sagastume	23 November 2007 (aged 16)	(National Football Federation of Guatemala) Antigua
14	MF	Ariel Lon	22 October 2006 (aged 17)	(National Football Federation of Guatemala) Guastatoya
15	DF	Carlos Aguilar	25 October 2006 (aged 17)	(National Football Federation of Guatemala) Malacateco
16	DF	Gary Perez	13 June 2007 (aged 17)	(United States Soccer Federation) Atlanta City FC
17	DF	Diego Cuque	15 July 2006 (aged 18)	(National Football Federation of Guatemala) Municipal
18	MF	Justin Racancoj	14 December 2005 (aged 18)	(National Football Federation of Guatemala) Xelajú
19	FW	Daniel Méndez	16 August 2005 (aged 18)	(Mexican Football Federation) Pachuca
20	FW	Marvin Ávila Jr	17 March 2008 (aged 16)	(National Football Federation of Guatemala) Antigua
21	GK	Álvaro Medrano	6 February 2007 (aged 17)	(United States Soccer Federation) Woodstock Academy

=== Haiti ===
Haiti announced their provisional list of 60 players on 18 June 2024, which was later reduced to 26 players on 3 July. The final 21-man squad was announced by CONCACAF on 12 July 2024, and then announced by the Haitian Football Federation on 16 July 2024 with Chris Jean-Francois replacing defender Alex Dealmeida.

Head coach: Angelo Jean-Baptiste

No.	Pos.	Player	Date of birth (age)	Club
1	GK	Tony Algarin	20 January 2007 (aged 17)	(French Football Federation) Metz
2	DF	Shaun Brun	27 August 2007 (aged 16)	(United States Soccer Federation) Sounders FC Academy
3	DF	Chris Jean-Francois	1 November 2005 (aged 18)	(United States Soccer Federation) Miami FC
4	DF	Mandell François	24 May 2005 (aged 19)	(Portuguese Football Federation) Leiria
5	DF	Jaylen-Andre Vilsaint	4 July 2005 (aged 19)	(Portuguese Football Federation) Torreense
6	MF	Belmar Joseph	13 October 2005 (aged 18)	(United States Soccer Federation) Villanova Wildcats
7	DF	Jordy Monclair	3 August 2005 (aged 18)	(French Football Federation) AAS Sarcelles
8	DF	Julian Bretous	21 January 2007 (aged 17)	(United States Soccer Federation) Atlanta United FC
9	FW	Isaie Louis	18 January 2005 (aged 19)	(Football Association of Ireland) Athlone Town
10	FW	Bryan Destin	25 February 2006 (aged 18)	(United States Soccer Federation) Inter Miami CF
11	FW	Ricardo Wagner	20 January 2005 (aged 19)	(German Football Association) TSG Hoffenheim
12	GK	Jonah Mednard	26 March 2005 (aged 19)	(United States Soccer Federation) Wake Forest Demon Deacons
13	FW	Seth Powder	26 July 2005 (aged 18)	(United States Soccer Federation) Loyola Ramblers
14	FW	Nelson Pierre	22 March 2005 (aged 19)	(Swedish Football Association) Skövde AIK
15	MF	Darrell Etienne	17 June 2005 (aged 19)	(United States Soccer Federation) Fairleigh Dickinson Knights
16	DF	Déryl Edmond	2 May 2006 (aged 18)	(French Football Federation) Paris
17	MF	All Gue	19 October 2005 (aged 18)	(United States Soccer Federation) Las Vegas Lights FC
18	FW	Guesly Alexandre	23 July 2005 (aged 18)	(Canadian Soccer Association) CS Mont-Royal Outremont
19	MF	Ganael Gay	29 May 2005 (aged 19)	(Brazilian Football Confederation) São Paulo
20	MF	Kaief Tomlinson	11 April 2006 (aged 18)	(United States Soccer Federation) Metropolitan Oval Academy
21	GK	Jérémy Sanon	22 December 2007 (aged 16)	(Canadian Soccer Association) CF Montréal
