= César Bustos =

Mexican footballer (born 2005)

Personal information
- Full name: César Rodrigo Bustos Hernández
- Date of birth: 27 August 2005 (age 21)
- Place of birth: Monterrey, Nuevo León, Mexico
- Height: 1.76 m (5 ft 9 in)
- Position: Centre-back

Team information
- Current team: Monterrey
- Number: 34

Youth career
- 2018–2025: Monterrey

Senior career*
Years	Team	Apps	(Gls)
2023–	Monterrey	7	(0)

International career^{‡}
2022	Mexico U18	2	(0)
2023	Mexico U19	4	(0)
2024–2025	Mexico U20	13	(0)
Medal record
Men's football
Representing Mexico
CONCACAF U-20 Championship
Winner	2024 Mexico
- * Club domestic league appearances and goals as of 9 September 2026 ‡ National team caps and goals as of 11 October 2025

César Rodrigo Bustos Hernández (born 27 August 2005) is a Mexican professional footballer who plays as a centre-back for Liga MX club Monterrey.

== Club career ==
=== Monterrey ===
Bustos began his career at the academy of Monterrey, progressing through all categories, until making his professional debut on 25 October 2023, playing the full match in a 3–1 win against Tijuana.

== Career statistics ==
=== Club ===
As of 9 September 2026

Appearances and goals by club, season and competition
Club	Season	League			Cup		Continental		Intercontinental		Other		Total	
Club	Season	Division	Apps	Goals	Apps	Goals	Apps	Goals	Apps	Goals	Apps	Goals	Apps	Goals
Monterrey	2023–24	Liga MX	5	0	—		—		—		—		5	0
Monterrey	2025–26	Liga MX	2	0	—		2 (Note: Appearances in CONCACAF Champions Cup)	0	—		—		4	0
Career total			7	0	0	0	2	0	0	0	0	0	9	0

== International career ==
In 2025, Bustos was called up by coach Eduardo Arce to represent Mexico at the FIFA U-20 World Cup held in Chile.

== Honours ==
Mexico

- CONCACAF U-20 Championship: 2024
