= Rodrigo Pachuca =

Mexican footballer (born 2005)

Personal information
- Full name: José Rodrigo Pachuca Martínez
- Date of birth: 24 July 2005 (age 21)
- Place of birth: Acapulco de Juárez, Guerrero, Mexico
- Height: 1.85 m (6 ft 1 in)
- Position: Centre-back

Team information
- Current team: Puebla
- Number: 20

Youth career
- 2021–2024: Puebla

Senior career*
Years	Team	Apps	(Gls)
2024–	Puebla	58	(1)

International career^{‡}
2024–	Mexico U20	14	(0)
Medal record
Men's football
Representing Mexico
CONCACAF U-20 Championship
Winner	2024 Mexico
Central American and Caribbean Games
Silver medal – second place	2026 Santo Domingo
- * Club domestic league appearances and goals as of 20 November 2026 ‡ National team caps and goals as of 11 October 2025

José Rodrigo Pachuca Martínez (born 24 July 2005) is a Mexican professional footballer who plays as a centre-back for Liga MX club Puebla.

== Club career ==
=== Puebla ===
Pachuca began his career at the academy of Puebla, progressing through all categories, until making his professional debut on 24 August 2024 in a 1–0 win against América.

== International career ==
In 2025, Pachuca was called up by coach Eduardo Arce to represent Mexico at the FIFA U-20 World Cup held in Chile.

== Career statistics ==
=== Club ===
As of match played on 20 November 2026

Club	Season	League			Cup		Continental		Global		Other		Total	
Club	Season	Division	Apps	Goals	Apps	Goals	Apps	Goals	Apps	Goals	Apps	Goals	Apps	Goals
Puebla	2024–25	Liga MX	26	0	—		—		—		—		26	0
Puebla	2025–26	Liga MX	20	1	—		—		—		2 (Note: Appearances in Leagues Cup)	0	22	1
Puebla	2026–27	Liga MX	12	0	—		—		—		—		12	0
Career total			58	1	0	0	0	0	0	0	2	0	60	1

== Honours ==
Mexico

- CONCACAF U-20 Championship: 2024
