= United States national soccer team =

United States national soccer team may refer to:

- United States men's national soccer team, men's national association football team
- United States women's national soccer team, women's national association football team

== See also ==
- United States national under-23 soccer team
- United States national under-20 soccer team
- United States national under-17 soccer team
