= Diego Ochoa (footballer, born 2005) =

Mexican footballer (born 2005)

Personal information
- Full name: Diego Ochoa Berdejo
- Date of birth: 20 April 2005 (age 21)
- Place of birth: Zapopan, Jalisco, Mexico
- Height: 1.85 m (6 ft 1 in)
- Position: Centre-back

Team information
- Current team: Necaxa (on loan from Guadalajara)
- Number: 15

Youth career
- 2018–: Guadalajara

Senior career*
Years	Team	Apps	(Gls)
2024–	Guadalajara	1	(0)
2024–2025	→ Tapatío (loan)	8	(1)
2025–2026	→ Juárez (loan)	7	(0)
2026–	→ Necaxa (loan)	6	(0)

International career^{‡}
2021	Mexico U17	1	(0)
2024–2025	Mexico U20	15	(3)
Medal record
Men's football
Representing Mexico
CONCACAF U-20 Championship
Winner	2024 Mexico
Central American and Caribbean Games
Silver medal – second place	2026 Santo Domingo
- * Club domestic league appearances and goals as of 6 November 2026 ‡ National team caps and goals as of 11 October 2025

Diego Ochoa Berdejo (born 20 April 2005) is a Mexican professional footballer who plays as a centre-back for Liga MX club Necaxa, on loan from Guadalajara.

== Club career ==
=== Early career ===
Ochoa began his career at the academy of Guadalajara, where he progressed through several categories, allowing him to eventually make his debut in Liga de Expansión MX.

=== Guadalajara / Tapatío ===
On 20 October 2024, Ochoa made his professional debut with Tapatío in a 2–0 win against Cancún, being subbed in at the 83rd minute. On 17 January 2025, he made his Liga MX debut, playing the first half of a 2–3 Guadalajara loss to Necaxa and on 2 February, playing for Tapatío, scored his first career goal in a 3–1 win against Oaxaca.

==== Juárez (loan) ====
On 4 July 2025, Ochoa was loaned to Juárez.

==== Necaxa (loan) ====
On 10 June 2026, Ochoa was loaned to Necaxa.

== International career ==
In 2025, Ochoa was called up by coach Eduardo Arce to represent Mexico at the FIFA U-20 World Cup held in Chile, scoring a game-tying header in a 2–2 draw with Brazil.

== Career statistics ==
=== Club ===
As of match played on 6 November 2026

Appearances and goals by club, season and competition
Club	Season	League			Cup		Continental		Club World Cup		Other		Total	
Club	Season	Division	Apps	Goals	Apps	Goals	Apps	Goals	Apps	Goals	Apps	Goals	Apps	Goals
Guadalajara	2024–25	Liga MX	1	0	—		—		—		—		1	0
Tapatío (loan)	2024–25	Liga de Expansión MX	8	1	—		—		—		—		8	1
Juárez (loan)	2025–26	Liga MX	7	0	—		—		—		—		7	0
Necaxa (loan)	2026–27	Liga MX	6	0	—		—		—		1 (Note: Appearances in Leagues Cup)	0	7	0
Career total			22	1	0	0	0	0	0	0	1	0	23	1

== Honours ==
Mexico

- CONCACAF U-20 Championship: 2024

Individual

- CONCACAF Under-20 Championship Best XI: 2024
