= Mateo Levy =

Mexican footballer (born 2006)

Personal information
- Full name: Mateo Levy Mendaña
- Date of birth: 22 October 2006 (age 20)
- Place of birth: Buenos Aires, Argentina
- Height: 1.76 m (5 ft 9 in)
- Position: Forward

Team information
- Current team: Cruz Azul
- Number: 214

Youth career
- 2018–: Cruz Azul

Senior career*
Years	Team	Apps	(Gls)
2024–	Cruz Azul	32	(0)
2026–	Cruz Azul Hidalgo	1	(0)

International career^{‡}
2023	Mexico U17	4	(0)
2024–	Mexico U20	8	(2)
Medal record
Men's football
Representing Mexico
CONCACAF U-20 Championship
Winner	2024 Mexico
Central American and Caribbean Games
Silver medal – second place	2026 Santo Domingo
- * Club domestic league appearances and goals as of 18 October 2026 ‡ National team caps and goals as of 4 October 2025

Mateo Levy Mendaña (born 22 October 2006) is a professional footballer who plays as a forward for Liga MX club Cruz Azul and the Mexico national under-20 team. Born in Argentina, he is a Mexico youth international.

== Early life ==
Levy was born on 22 October 2006 in Buenos Aires, Argentina and has an older sister. The son of Mariano Levy and Eugenia Mendaña, he grew up supporting Argentine side Boca Juniors and moved with his family to Mexico in 2017.

== Club career ==
As a youth player, after trialing with América's youth academy, he joined the youth system of Cruz Azul, where he progressed through the ranks before being promoted to the first team in 2024. He made his professional debut on 14 January 2024 in a 0–1 home defeat to Pachuca in Liga MX. During his debut season, Mexican news website Futbol Total described him as "one of Cruz Azul's great revelations," highlighting his qualities and frequent appearances as a substitute in the team's formation.

== International career ==
In 2025, Levy was called up by coach Eduardo Arce to represent Mexico at the FIFA U-20 World Cup held in Chile.

== Career statistics ==
As of 18 October 2026

Appearances and goals by club, season and competition
Club	Season	League			National cup		Continental (Note: Includes CONCACAF Champions Cup)		Other		Total	
Club	Season	Division	Apps	Goals	Apps	Goals	Apps	Goals	Apps	Goals	Apps	Goals
Cruz Azul	2023–24	Liga MX	12	0	—		—		—		12	0
Cruz Azul	2024–25	Liga MX	7	0	—		—		—		7	0
Cruz Azul	2025–26	Liga MX	13	0	—		3	0	3 (Note: Appearances in Leagues Cup)	0	19	0
Cruz Azul	2026–27	Liga MX	—		—		—		1	0	1	0
Cruz Azul	Total		32	0	—		3	0	4	0	39	0
Cruz Azul Hidalgo	2026–27	Liga de Expansión MX	1	0	—		—		—		1	0
Career total			33	0	0	0	3	0	4	0	40	0

== Honours ==
Cruz Azul

- Liga MX: Clausura 2026

Mexico U20

- CONCACAF U-20 Championship: 2024
