= Diego Sánchez (footballer, born 2005) =

Mexican footballer (born 2005)

Personal information
- Full name: Diego Alexander Sánchez Guevara
- Date of birth: 12 April 2005 (age 21)
- Place of birth: Monterrey, Nuevo León, Mexico
- Height: 1.55 m (5 ft 1 in)
- Position: Winger

Team information
- Current team: Tigres UANL
- Number: 30

Youth career
- 2021–2023: Tigres UANL

Senior career*
Years	Team	Apps	(Gls)
2023–	Tigres UANL	38	(5)

International career^{‡}
2024–2025	Mexico U20	15	(2)
Medal record
Men's football
Representing Mexico
CONCACAF U-20 Championship
Winner	2024 Mexico
- * Club domestic league appearances and goals as of 7 November 2026 ‡ National team caps and goals as of 11 October 2025

Diego Alexander Sánchez Guevara (born 12 April 2005), also known as Chicha, is a Mexican professional footballer who plays as a winger for Liga MX club Tigres UANL.

== Club career ==
=== Tigres UANL ===
Sánchez began his career at the academy of Tigres UANL, progressing through all categories, until making his professional debut on 17 March 2023, being subbed in at the 85th minute of a 5–1 win against Mazatlán. and on 8 August 2025, he scored his first goal as a professional in a 7–0 win against Puebla.

== International career ==
In 2025, Sánchez was called up by coach Eduardo Arce to represent Mexico at the FIFA U-20 World Cup held in Chile.

== Career statistics ==
=== Club ===
As of match played on 7 November 2026

Club	Season	League			Cup		Continental		Global		Other		Total	
Club	Season	Division	Apps	Goals	Apps	Goals	Apps	Goals	Apps	Goals	Apps	Goals	Apps	Goals
Tigres UANL	2023–24	Liga MX	1	0	—		—		—		—		1	0
Tigres UANL	2024–25	Liga MX	5	0	—		—		—		—		5	0
Tigres UANL	2025–26	Liga MX	17	4	—		6 (Note: Appearances in CONCACAF Champions Cup)	0	—		—		17	4
Tigres UANL	2026–27	Liga MX	15	1	—		—		—		3 (Note: Appearances in Leagues Cup)	0	18	1
Career total			38	5	0	0	6	0	0	0	3	0	47	5

== Honours ==
Mexico

- CONCACAF U-20 Championship: 2024
