= Alexéi Domínguez =

Mexican footballer (born 2005)

Personal information
- Full name: Alexei Domínguez Figueroa
- Date of birth: 3 January 2005 (age 21)
- Place of birth: Apatzingán de la Constitución, Michoacán, Mexico
- Height: 1.71 m (5 ft 7 in)
- Position: Winger

Team information
- Current team: Pachuca
- Number: 8

Youth career
- 2018–2023: Pachuca

Senior career*
Years	Team	Apps	(Gls)
2023–	Pachuca	63	(2)

International career^{‡}
2021	Mexico U17	1	(0)
2023	Mexico U19	1	(0)
2024–2025	Mexico U20	9	(2)
Medal record
Men's football
Representing Mexico
CONCACAF U-20 Championship
Winner	2024 Mexico
- * Club domestic league appearances and goals as of 2 October 2026 ‡ National team caps and goals as of 11 October 2025

Alexei Domínguez Figueroa (born 3 January 2005) is a Mexican professional footballer who plays as a winger for Liga MX club Pachuca.

== Club career ==
=== Pachuca ===
Domínguez began his career at the academy of Pachuca, progressing through all categories, until making his professional debut on 23 September 2023 in a scoreless draw against Guadalajara.

== International career ==
In 2025, Domínguez was called up by coach Eduardo Arce to represent Mexico at the FIFA U-20 World Cup held in Chile, scoring the team's first goal of the tournament in a 2–2 draw with Brazil.

== Career statistics ==
=== Club ===
As of 2 October 2026

Club	Season	League			Cup		Continental		Global		Other		Total	
Club	Season	Division	Apps	Goals	Apps	Goals	Apps	Goals	Apps	Goals	Apps	Goals	Apps	Goals
Pachuca	2023–24	Liga MX	20	0	—		4 (Note: Appearances in CONCACAF Champions Cup)	1	—		—		24	1
Pachuca	2024–25	Liga MX	10	0	—		—		1 (Note: Appearances in FIFA Intercontinental Cup)	0	—		11	0
Pachuca	2025–26	Liga MX	30	2	—		—		3 (Note: Appearances in FIFA Club World Cup)	0	4 (Note: Appearances in Leagues Cup)	2	37	4
Pachuca	2026–27	Liga MX	3	0	—		—		—		2	0	5	0
Career total			63	2	0	0	4	1	4	0	6	2	77	5

== Honours ==
Pachuca

- CONCACAF Champions Cup: 2024
- FIFA Derby of the Americas: 2024
- FIFA Challenger Cup: 2024

Mexico

- CONCACAF U-20 Championship: 2024

Individual

- Liga MX All-Star: 2026
