= Ethan Kohler =

American soccer player (born 2005)

- Kohler with the New England Revolution in 2026

Personal information
- Date of birth: May 20, 2005 (age 21)
- Place of birth: Campbell, California, United States
- Height: 6 ft 0 in (1.83 m)
- Positions: Defender; defensive midfielder

Team information
- Current team: New England Revolution
- Number: 22

Youth career
- 2019–2022: San Jose Earthquakes

Senior career*
Years	Team	Apps	(Gls)
2022–2023	San Jose Earthquakes II	11	(0)
2023	Oakland Roots	0	(0)
2023–2025	Werder Bremen II	34	(2)
2025	→ SC Verl (loan)	4	(0)
2025–	New England Revolution	11	(0)

International career^{‡}
2024	United States U19	4	(0)
2024–2025	United States U20	16	(1)
2025–	United States U23	2	(0)
Medal record
Men's football
Representing United States
CONCACAF U-20 Championship
Runner-up	2024 Mexico
- * Club domestic league appearances and goals as of July 23, 2026 ‡ National team caps and goals as of November 18, 2025

Ethan Kohler (born May 20, 2005) is an American professional soccer player who plays as a defender or defensive midfielder for Major League Soccer club New England Revolution.

== Club career ==
Kohler is a youth product of the San Jose Earthquakes academy, and began his senior career with their reserves in the MLS Next Pro in 2022. In July 2022, he committed to Stanford University for Division 1 soccer after achieving a 4.0 GPA. On January 26, 2023, he joined Oakland Roots where he signed his first professional contract. On June 17, he transferred to German club Werder Bremen where he was originally assigned to their youth sides.

On June 24, 2025, Kohler was loaned by SC Verl in 3. Liga.

=== New England Revolution ===
On December 31, 2025, the New England Revolution announced the signing of Kohler on a contract until the 2028–29 season, with an option to extend for one more year. Kohler made his Revolution debut (and first start) on February 21 in the 2026 season opener, playing the full 90 minutes of the club's 4-1 loss to Nashville SC. He recorded his first MLS assist on September 19 in the Revolution's 4-2 win over Orlando City SC.

== International career ==
Kohler was born in the United States and is of German descent through his father, and Indonesian descent through his mother. He was called up to a training camp for the United States U14s in January 2019. He later was called to the United States men's U19s for a camp in April 2022.
