= Xavier Biscayzacú =

Mexican footballer (born 2005)

Personal information
- Full name: Xavier Biscayzacú Vázquez
- Date of birth: 28 March 2005 (age 21)
- Place of birth: Veracruz, Mexico
- Height: 1.67 m (5 ft 6 in)
- Position: Attacking midfielder

Team information
- Current team: Defensor SC
- Number: 10

Youth career
- ISyD Rincón de Carrasco
- Deportivo Cali
- Club Ombú
- Defensor SC

Senior career*
Years	Team	Apps	(Gls)
2024–	Defensor SC	54	(8)

International career^{‡}
2022–2023	Mexico U18	6	(2)
2023	Mexico U19	1	(0)
2024–	Mexico U20	6	(2)
Medal record
Men's football
Representing Mexico
CONCACAF U-20 Championship
Winner	2024 Mexico
- * Club domestic league appearances and goals as of 1 October 2025 ‡ National team caps and goals as of 20:12, 23 August 2024 (UTC)

Xavier Biscayzacú Vázquez (born 28 March 2005) is a Mexican professional footballer who plays as an attacking midfielder for the Uruguayan Primera División club Defensor Sporting and the Mexico national under-20 team.

== Club career ==
Biscayzacú is a youth product of ISyD Rincón de Carrasco, Deportivo Cali, Club Ombú and Defensor Sporting. On 13 October 2023, he signed his first professional contract with Defensor Sporting. He made his senior and professional debut with the club in a 2–1 Uruguayan Primera División loss to Rampla Juniors on 18 August 2024.

== International career ==
Born in Mexico, Biscayzacú is of Uruguayan descent. He was first called up to the Mexico U16s in 2020, before being called up to a training camp for Uruguay in advance of the 2022 World Cup. He was part of the Mexico U20 national team that won the 2024 CONCACAF U-20 Championship.

== Personal life ==
Xavier is the son of the Uruguayan football manager and former player Gustavo Biscayzacú, and was born in Mexico while his father was playing in the Liga MX at that time.

== Honours ==
Mexico U20

- CONCACAF U-20 Championship: 2024

Individual

- IFFHS Men's Youth (U20) CONCACAF Best XI: 2025
