= David Vazquez (soccer, born 2006) =

American soccer player (born 2006)

Personal information
- Date of birth: February 22, 2006 (age 20)
- Place of birth: Los Angeles, California, US
- Height: 1.75 m (5 ft 9 in)
- Position: Midfielder

Team information
- Current team: San Diego FC
- Number: 19

Youth career
- 2014–2021: Total Futbol Academy
- 2021–2024: Philadelphia Union

Senior career*
Years	Team	Apps	(Gls)
2022–2025	Philadelphia Union II	57	(10)
2024–2025	Philadelphia Union	1	(0)
2025	→ San Diego FC (loan)	4	(0)
2026–	San Diego FC	0	(0)

International career^{‡}
2022–2023	United States U17	17	(1)
2024–2025	United States U19	6	(0)
2024–	United States U20	5	(3)
- * Club domestic league appearances and goals as of 23:15, December 11, 2025 (UTC) ‡ National team caps and goals as of 14:02, September 19, 2025 (UTC)

David Vazquez (Spanish: Vázquez; born February 22, 2006) is an American professional soccer player who plays as a midfielder for Major League Soccer club San Diego FC.

== Club career ==
Vazquez joined the youth academy of the Los Angeles-based academy Total Futbol Academy since the age of 8, where he completed his youth development. He moved to Philadelphia Union's youth academy in 2021, and in 2022 made his first appearance in the MLS Next Pro with their reserves Philadelphia Union II. On February 29, 2024, he signed his first professional contract with Philadelphia Union II. On April 29, 2024, he transferred to the senior Philadelphia Union team as a Homegrown Player until 2027 with an option to extend until 2028. He debuted with the senior Philadelphia Union side in a 1–1 (6–5) U.S. Open Cup win over Indy Eleven on May 8, 2025.

On July 28, 2025, Vazquez joined Major League Soccer club San Diego FC with a permanent trade option. On December 9, the club exercised their option to fully acquire Vazquez in exchange for up to $500,000 in general allocation money.

== International career ==
Born in the United States, Vazquez is of Mexican descent and holds dual American-Mexican citizenship. He played for the United States U17s at the 2023 FIFA U-17 World Cup. He was tied for top scorer with 3 goals for the United States U20s at the 2024 CONCACAF U-20 Championship. He was again called up to the U20s for the 2025 FIFA U-20 World Cup.
