= Pedro Soma =

American soccer player (born 2006)

Personal information
- Full name: Pedro J. Soma
- Date of birth: June 30, 2006 (age 20)
- Place of birth: Boca Raton, Florida, United States
- Height: 1.79 m (5 ft 10 in)
- Position: Defensive midfielder

Team information
- Current team: San Diego FC
- Number: 15

Youth career
- Boca United
- 2020–2023: Cornellà
- 2024–2025: → Barcelona (loan)

Senior career*
Years	Team	Apps	(Gls)
2023–2025	Cornellà	13	(0)
2024–2025	→ Barcelona B (loan)	22	(0)
2025–	San Diego FC	5	(0)

International career^{‡}
2022	United States U16	3	(0)
2022–2023	United States U17	10	(1)
2022	United States U18	5	(0)
2024–	United States U19	1	(0)
2024–	United States U20	16	(3)
Medal record
Men's football
Representing United States
CONCACAF U-20 Championship
Runner-up	2024 Mexico
- * Club domestic league appearances and goals as of October 22, 2025 ‡ National team caps and goals as of October 22, 2025

Pedro J. Soma (born June 30, 2006) is an American professional soccer player currently playing as a defensive midfielder for Major League Soccer club San Diego FC.

== Early life ==
Soma was born in Boca Raton, Florida, to a Brazilian mother and American father and was raised in nearby Coconut Creek.

== Club career ==
Having first taken an interest in football at a very young age, he joined a local academy in Florida: Boca Raton Juniors Soccer Club. Afterwards, he moved to Boca United (now called South Florida Football Academy) at the age of six or seven. In October 2018, he was offered the chance to go on a student exchange program to Barcelona, Spain, and he played grassroots football there for two years before being scouted by professional side Cornellà. He has credited fellow American soccer players Adrian Gill and Diego Kochen, both in the academy of Barcelona, for helping him settle in the region, and describes the latter as his best friend.

Having made his debut in the Primera Federación with Cornellà, he began to attract the attention of Barcelona, with manager Xavi reportedly having told president Joan Laporta that he wishes to sign the midfielder. Barça signed him on loan from Cornellà on August 29, 2024, with an $881k purchase option. FC Barcelona assigned him to their B team in the Spanish 3rd division, for whom he made his debut on October 2, 2024. He made 28 appearances (20 starts) with 2 assists in the 2024-25 season. Barça B's relegation from the 3rd division at the end of the season, however, disrupted many plans the club had for youth development, and the club did not exercise their purchase option to retain Soma.

On July 28, 2025, San Diego FC announced they had acquired Soma on permanent transfer from Cornellà for a non-disclosed fee, and signed him to a 4-year deal. He made his debut for the club - and his first appearance as a first-team professional - on August 6, 2025, in a Leagues Cup match against Mazatlán.

== International career ==
Soma received his first call-up to the United States youth system in January 2022, and having impressed in both the January training camp and a trip to South America in March, he was one of the stand-out players in a UEFA Under-16 Development Tournament held in May of the same year. Called up again for the 2023 CONCACAF U-17 Championship, Soma helped the United States reach the final of the competition, but despite scoring, he could not prevent his side losing 3–1 to Mexico in the final match.

== Career statistics ==
=== Club ===
As of January 2, 2025

Appearances and goals by club, season and competition
Club	Season	League			Cup		Europe		Other		Total	
Club	Season	Division	Apps	Goals	Apps	Goals	Apps	Goals	Apps	Goals	Apps	Goals
Cornellà	2023–24	Primera Federación	13	0	0	0	—		1 (Note: Appearances in Copa Catalunya)	0	14	0
Barcelona Atlètic	2024–25	Primera Federación	12	0	—		—		—		12	0
Career total			25	0	0	0	0	0	1	0	26	0
