= Nimfasha Berchimas =

American soccer player (born 2008)

Personal information
- Full name: Nimfasha Berchimas
- Date of birth: February 22, 2008 (age 18)
- Place of birth: Tanzania
- Height: 1.72 m (5 ft 8 in)
- Positions: Winger; forward

Team information
- Current team: Charlotte FC
- Number: 27

Youth career
- 2018–2020: Piedmont Triad FC
- 2020: NC Fusion
- 2020–2023: Charlotte

Senior career*
Years	Team	Apps	(Gls)
2023–	Crown Legacy	58	(18)
2024–	Charlotte FC	3	(0)

International career^{‡}
2022	United States U15	4	(0)
2022–2023	United States U16	5	(1)
2023–	United States U17	5	(5)
2024–	United States U19	2	(0)
2024–	United States U20	6	(2)
Medal record
Men's football
Representing United States
CONCACAF U-20 Championship
Runner-up	2024 Mexico
- * Club domestic league appearances and goals as of November 15, 2026 ‡ National team caps and goals as of October 15, 2024

Nimfasha Berchimas (born February 22, 2008) is a professional soccer player who plays as a winger or forward for Major League Soccer club Charlotte FC. Born in Tanzania, he represents the United States at youth level.

== Early life ==
Berchimas was born in Tanzania and is of Burundian descent. He moved to the United States as a child, settling in Georgia, before relocating to High Point, North Carolina.

== Club career ==
Having begun his soccer career with local side first with Piedmont Triad Football Club (now Carolina Core FC Youth) then with NC Fusion, he signed with professional Major League Soccer franchise Charlotte FC in 2020. In November 2022, he signed a homegrown contract with the club at the age of 14 years and 268 days old, making him the sixth-youngest player in MLS history to sign professionally.

He played eight matches with Charlotte's MLS Next Pro reserve team, Crown Legacy FC, during the 2023 season. Berchimas made his senior MLS debut for Charlotte FC on February 24, 2024, in their 1–0 victory against New York City FC, making him the 9th youngest player in MLS history.

== International career ==
Having already represented the United States at under-15 and under-16 level, Berchimas was called up to the nation's under-17 side for the 2023 FIFA U-17 World Cup. Despite being the youngest player in the squad, he started the United States' campaign with two goals in a 3–1 victory against South Korea. In scoring, he became the youngest player to score for the United States at an U-17 World Cup since Freddy Adu in 2003. He followed this up with a goal in the United States' 2–1 win against Burkina Faso, taking him joint-first in the tournament's goal-scoring chart.

== Career statistics ==
=== Club ===
As of March 9, 2024

Appearances and goals by club, season and competition
Club	Season	League			National cup		Continental		Other		Total	
Club	Season	Division	Apps	Goals	Apps	Goals	Apps	Goals	Apps	Goals	Apps	Goals
Crown Legacy FC	2023	MLS Next Pro	8	1	—		—		—		8	1
Charlotte FC	2024	MLS	3	0	0	0	—		—		3	0
Career total			11	1	0	0	0	0	0	0	11	1
