= Oumar Diallo (soccer) =

Canadian soccer player (born 2005)

Personal information
- Date of birth: February 27, 2005 (age 21)
- Place of birth: Aurora, Ontario, Canada
- Height: 1.88 m (6 ft 2 in)
- Position: Forward

Team information
- Current team: LASK
- Number: 49

Youth career
- –2019: Aurora FC
- 2020–2021: Richmond Hill SC
- 2022–2024: Inter Milan

Senior career*
| Years | Team | Apps | (Gls) |
| 2022 | Cannara | 7 | (1) |
| 2024– | LASK Amateure OÖ | 22 | (6) |
| 2024– | LASK | 1 | (0) |

International career^{‡}
| 2024 | Canada U20 | 6 | (0) |
- * Club domestic league appearances and goals ‡ National team caps and goals as of 31 July 2024

Oumar Diallo (born February 27, 2005) is a Canadian professional soccer player who plays as a forward for Austrian Bundesliga club LASK.

== Early life ==
Diallo played youth soccer in Canada with Aurora FC and Richmond Hill SC.

In September 2022, after having played at the senior level in Serie D with Cannara, he joined the Inter Milan U18.

== Club career ==
In 2022, Diallo joined Italian Serie D side Cannara, with whom he made seven appearances. Afterwards, he subsequently returned to youth level, joining Inter Milan U18.

In June 2024,he joined LASK Amateure OÖ (the second team of LASK) in the third tier Austrian Regionalliga. He made his debut with the first team in the Austrian Bundesliga on September 14, 2024, in a 1-0 loss to FC Blau-Weiß Linz.

== International career ==
Born in Canada, Diallo is of Guinean descent.

In 2024, he was named to the Canada U20 team for the 2024 CONCACAF U-20 Championship.

== Career statistics ==
As of June 6, 2025

| Club | Season | League | | | Domestic Cup | | League Cup | | Other | | Total | |
| Club | Season | Division | Apps | Goals | Apps | Goals | Apps | Goals | Apps | Goals | Apps | Goals |
|---|---|---|---|---|---|---|---|---|---|---|---|---|
| Cannara | 2021–22 | Serie D | 7 | 0 | – | | 0 | 0 | – | | 19 | 4 |
| LASK Amateure OÖ | 2024–25 | Austrian Regionalliga Mitte | 22 | 6 | – | | – | | – | | 22 | 6 |
| LASK | 2024–25 | Austrian Bundesliga | 1 | 0 | 0 | 0 | – | | – | | 1 | 0 |
| Career total | | | 30 | 6 | 0 | 0 | 0 | 0 | 0 | 0 | 30 | 6 |
