= 1992 CONCACAF U-20 Tournament qualifying =

This article features the 1992 CONCACAF U-20 Tournament qualifying stage. The qualifying tournament was only for Caribbean teams. Bermuda automatically qualified, as well as the North American Canada, Mexico and the United States, and the Central American Costa Rica and Honduras. Matches were played in November and December 1991. Seventeen teams entered the qualifying stage and five teams qualified for the main tournament in Canada.

== Group A ==
Teams	Pld	W	D	L	GF	GA	GD	Pts
Cuba	5	5	0	0	20	1	+19	10
Guadeloupe	5	4	0	1	20	1	+19	8
Dominican Republic	5	3	0	2	14	5	+9	6
Saint Kitts and Nevis	5	2	0	3	3	9	–6	4
Puerto Rico	5	1	0	4	8	14	–6	2
Anguilla	5	0	0	5	0	35	–35	0

Dominican Republic	11–0	Anguilla
Cuba	2-1	Guadeloupe
Puerto Rico	1–2	Saint Kitts and Nevis
Guadeloupe	9–0	Anguilla
Cuba	3–0	Saint Kitts and Nevis
Puerto Rico	0–1	Dominican Republic
Cuba	7–0	Anguilla
Dominican Republic	1–0	Saint Kitts and Nevis
Puerto Rico	0–5	Guadeloupe
Cuba	2–1	Dominican Republic
Saint Kitts and Nevis	0–5	Guadeloupe
Puerto Rico	7–0	Anguilla
Puerto Rico	0–7	Cuba
Saint Kitts and Nevis	1–0	Anguilla
Guadeloupe	5–0	Dominican Republic

== Group B ==
Teams	Pld	W	D	L	GF	GA	GD	Pts
Jamaica	3	2	0	1	8	4	+4	4
Martinique	3	1	1	1	7	3	+4	3
Saint Lucia	3	1	1	1	4	5	–1	3
Cayman Islands	3	1	0	2	1	8	–7	2

Martinique	0–0	Saint Lucia
Jamaica	0–1	Cayman Islands
Cayman Islands	0–5	Martinique
Jamaica	5–1	Saint Lucia
Saint Lucia	3–0	Cayman Islands
Jamaica	3–2	Martinique

== Group C ==
Teams	Pld	W	D	L	GF	GA	GD	Pts
Trinidad and Tobago	3	2	1	0	9	4	+5	5
French Guiana	3	1	2	0	9	6	+3	4
Suriname	3	1	1	1	6	7	–1	3
Guyana	3	0	0	3	1	8	–7	0

Trinidad and Tobago	3–3	French Guiana
Guyana	0–3	Suriname
Suriname	0–4	Trinidad and Tobago
Guyana	0–3	French Guiana
Suriname	3–3	French Guiana
Guyana	1–2	Trinidad and Tobago

== Group D ==
Teams	Pld	W	D	L	GF	GA	GD	Pts
Netherlands Antilles	2	2	0	0	6	4	+2	4
Barbados	2	1	0	1	4	4	0	2
Haiti	2	0	0	2	5	7	–2	0

Netherlands Antilles	2–1	Barbados
Barbados	3–2	Haiti
Netherlands Antilles	4–3	Haiti

== See also ==
- 1992 CONCACAF U-20 Tournament
