= Marcos Zambrano =

Soccer player (born 2005)

- Zambrano with the New England Revolution in 2026

Personal information
- Full name: Marcos Alberto Zambrano Delgado
- Date of birth: January 20, 2005 (age 21)
- Place of birth: Guayaquil, Ecuador
- Height: 1.80 m (5 ft 11 in)
- Position: Forward

Team information
- Current team: New England Revolution
- Number: 17

Youth career
- –2021: C.S. Norte América
- 2021–2023: Philadelphia Union
- 2023: Benfica

Senior career*
Years	Team	Apps	(Gls)
2022	Philadelphia Union II	2	(0)
2023–2024	Benfica B	0	(0)
2024–2025	Vitória Guimarães B	6	(1)
2025–2026	Real Salt Lake	0	(0)
2025–2026	Real Monarchs	10	(7)
2026	→ New England Revolution (loan)	3	(0)
2026–	New England Revolution	0	(0)

International career^{‡}
2019	Ecuador U16	2	(0)
2022	United States U17	1	(0)
2022	United States U19	2	(1)
2024–	United States U20	18	(7)
Medal record
Men's football
Representing United States
CONCACAF U-20 Championship
Runner-up	2024 Mexico
- * Club domestic league appearances and goals as of July 23, 2026 ‡ National team caps and goals as of October 10, 2025

Marcos Alberto Zambrano Delgado (born January 20, 2005) is a professional soccer player who plays as a forward for New England Revolution. Born in Ecuador, he represents the United States at youth level.

== Early life ==
Zambrano was born in Guayaquil, Ecuador. He joined the Philadelphia Union's academy with his brother Mateo at the start of 2021 having been waiting since Autumn 2020 for clearance from the US Federation. The brothers possessed US passports through their father who was born in New York.

== Club career ==
=== Early career ===
Zambrano played as the Philadelphia Union U-17s won the MLS Next Cup in 2021–2022. In August 2022 Zambrano scored for the Eastern Conference in the inaugural MLS Next All-Star Game. In January 2023 he joined Portuguese side S.L. Benfica.

On January 21, 2024, Zambrano left Benfica and signed a contract until 2027 with Vitória de Guimarães, initially joining the club's B team, competing in the Campeonato de Portugal.

On July 31, 2025, Zambrano signed with Real Salt Lake of Major League Soccer.

=== New England Revolution ===
On March 27, 2026, Zambrano was acquired on loan through the 2026 season by the New England Revolution in return for a third-round 2027 MLS SuperDraft pick.

Zambrano made his debut for the club (and recorded his first start) in the 2026 U.S. Open Cup round of 32, playing 90 minutes in the Revolution's win over Rhode Island FC on April 15, 2026. He scored his first Revolution goal (also the first of his senior career) on April 29 in a 4–3 loss to Orlando City SC in the U.S. Open Cup round of 16. Zambrano made his Major League Soccer debut on May 13, coming on as a 78th minute substitute for Dor Turgeman in a 3-0 loss to Nashville SC.

On July 17, 2026, New England made Zambrano's stay at the club permanent.

== International career ==
Marcos played for Ecuador's under-15 and under-17 teams, but switched nationality to the United States and was called up to the United States national under-19 team. In October 2022 Zambrano was called into the United States under-20 squad.
