= Farbod Samadian =

Costa Rican footballer (born 2005)

Farbod Samadian فربد صمدیان خاتمی
Personal information
- Full name: Farbod Samadian Khatami
- Date of birth: 6 February 2005 (age 21)
- Place of birth: San José, Costa Rica
- Height: 1.88 m (6 ft 2 in)
- Position: Centre-back

Team information
- Current team: Alajuelense

Youth career
- 2012–2014: Saprissa
- 2015–2020: Saipa
- 2021–2022: Guadalupe
- 2023–2024: Cartaginés
- 2024–: Alajuelense

Senior career*
Years	Team	Apps	(Gls)
2024–	Alajuelense	0	(0)
2026	→ Puntarenas (loan)	17	(3)

International career
2024	Costa Rica U20	13	(0)
2025	Costa Rica U21	4	(0)
2023	Costa Rica U23	1	(0)
2026	Costa Rica	0	(0)
- * Club domestic league appearances and goals

Farbod Samadian Khatami (Persian: فربد صمدیان خاتمی; born 6 February 2005) is a Costa Rican footballer who plays as a centre-back for Liga FPD club Alajuelense.

== Career ==
Born and raised in Costa Rica to Iranian parents, Samadian began his youth career in Saprissa until the age of 10, when his family returned to Iran. There, he resumed his formation with Saipa until the age of 16, when the family returned to Costa Rica in order to avoid Samadian's conscription in the Iranian Armed Forces. Back in Costa Rica, he has had stints with the youth teams of Guadalupe, Cartaginés, and most recently, Alajuelense, currently still playing for the later.

In early 2026, Alajuelense loaned Samadian to Puntarenas, with whom he would make his senior debut. In May of that year, he would be called up to Alajuelense's first team, while also receiving his first call-up to the senior national team, in substitution of the injured Jorkaeff Azofeifa.

== Personal life ==
Samadian holds both Costa Rican and Iranian citizenships, and is eligible to play for either national team. He is a Christian despite his family coming from a Muslim-majority country, owing that his parents are not strictly religious and had let him choose his own creed. He is studying computer engineering at the Costa Rica Institute of Technology.
