= 1994 CONCACAF U-20 Tournament =

Premundial CONCACAF Sub-20 1994 (in Spanish)

Tournament details
- Host country: Honduras
- Dates: 17–28 August 1994 (11 days)
- Teams: 12 (from 1 confederation)
- Venues: 3 (in 3 host cities)

Final positions
- Champions: Honduras (2nd title)
- Runners-up: Costa Rica
- Third place: Canada
- Fourth place: El Salvador

Tournament statistics
- Matches played: 24
- Goals scored: 111 (4.63 per match)
- Top scorer: (El Salvador) José Alvarado
- All statistics correct as of 28 August 1994.

The 1994 CONCACAF U-20 Tournament was an association football tournament that took place in Honduras in August 1994. It determined the two CONCACAF teams that participated at the 1995 FIFA World Youth Championship.

== Venues ==
1994 CONCACAF U-20 Tournament is located in Honduras	Tegucigalpa	San Pedro Sula	Puerto Cortés
1994 CONCACAF U-20 Tournament is located in Honduras	Estadio Tiburcio Carías Andino	Estadio Francisco Morazán	Estadio Excélsior
1994 CONCACAF U-20 Tournament is located in Honduras	Capacity: 35,000	Capacity: 18,000	Capacity: 7,910

== Qualification ==
As in 1992 a qualifying stage was organised for the Caribbean and for the first time as well for Central America. The format was smaller than for the previous tournament, with teams only having to play one or two opponents. 12 Caribbean teams entered, of which 4 qualified in two rounds. 6 Central American teams entered, of which 4 qualified as well, but in one round.

=== Caribbean ===
==== First round ====
Team 1	Agg.	Team 2	1st leg	2nd leg
Netherlands Antilles	2–4	Aruba	1–1	1–3
Barbados	0–5	Grenada	0–1	0–4
Martinique	6–0	Saint Lucia	5–0	1–0
Antigua and Barbuda	1–3	Saint Kitts and Nevis	1–1	0–2

==== Second round ====
Four winners from the first round participated here. The Cayman Islands, Guyana, Jamaica and Trinidad and Tobago entered as well.

Team 1	Agg.	Team 2	1st leg	2nd leg
Martinique	8–1	Saint Kitts and Nevis	5–0	3–1
Trinidad and Tobago	3–0	Grenada	0–0	3–0
Guyana	6–0	Aruba	4–0	2–0
Cayman Islands	0–7	Jamaica	0–4	0–3

=== Central America ===
Team 1	Agg.	Team 2	1st leg	2nd leg
El Salvador	8–1	Nicaragua	6–0	2–1
Costa Rica	14–0	Panama	8–0	6–0
Belize	2–5	Guatemala	1–2	1–3

== Qualified teams ==
The following teams qualified for the tournament:

Region	Qualification	Qualifiers
Caribbean (CFU)	1 or 2 play-off rounds	Guyana; Jamaica; Martinique; Trinidad and Tobago
Central America (UNCAF)	1 play-off round	Belize^{1} Costa Rica; El Salvador; Guatemala
Central America (UNCAF)	host	Honduras
North America (NAFU)	Automatically qualified	Canada; Mexico; United States

^{1}Belize qualified for Central America by achieving the smallest loss

== Group phase ==
=== Group A ===
Pos	Team	Pld	W	D	L	GF	GA	GD	Pts	Qualification
1	Honduras	3	3	0	0	11	3	+8	9	Qualified to the Final phase
2	Canada	3	2	0	1	13	3	+10	6	Qualified to the Final phase
3	Martinique	3	1	0	2	6	10	−4	3	
4	Belize	3	0	0	3	3	17	−14	0	

18 August 1994
(UTC−06:00)
Day 1

Belize	0–7	Canada
	report	Capasso 8', 59'; Nash 15', 33'; Xausa 28'; Pizzolitto 40'; Allegranza 68'

Estadio Tiburcio Carías Andino, Tegucigalpa, Honduras
18 August 1994
(UTC−06:00)
Day 1

Honduras	3–1	Martinique

Estadio Tiburcio Carías Andino, Tegucigalpa, Honduras

20 August 1994
(UTC−06:00)
Day 2

Belize	3–5	Martinique

Estadio Tiburcio Carías Andino, Tegucigalpa, Honduras
20 August 1994
(UTC−06:00)
Day 2

Honduras	3–2	Canada
Medina 37'; 45' (o.g.); Bailey 65'	report	Xausa 48'; Nash 72'

Estadio Tiburcio Carías Andino, Tegucigalpa, Honduras

22 August 1994
(UTC−06:00)
Day 3

Canada	4–0	Martinique
Xausa 7'; Nash 64'; Bosch 70'; Brennan 85'	report

Estadio Tiburcio Carías Andino, Tegucigalpa, Honduras
22 August 1994
(UTC−06:00)
Day 3

Honduras	5–0	Belize
Cabrera; Oseguera; Umanzor

Estadio Tiburcio Carías Andino, Tegucigalpa, Honduras

=== Group B ===
Pos	Team	Pld	W	D	L	GF	GA	GD	Pts	Qualification
1	Costa Rica	3	3	0	0	13	3	+10	9	Qualified to the Final phase
2	Mexico	3	2	0	1	8	6	+2	6	
3	Jamaica	3	1	0	2	8	13	−5	3	
4	Guatemala	3	0	0	3	6	13	−7	0	

17 August 1994
(UTC−06:00)
Day 1

Guatemala	0–2	Mexico

Estadio Francisco Morazán, San Pedro Sula, Honduras
17 August 1994
(UTC−06:00)
Day 1

Costa Rica	3–1	Jamaica

Estadio Francisco Morazán, San Pedro Sula, Honduras

19 August 1994
(UTC−06:00)
Day 2

Costa Rica	5–1	Guatemala

Estadio Francisco Morazán, San Pedro Sula, Honduras
19 August 1994
(UTC−06:00)
Day 2

Jamaica	1–5	Mexico

Estadio Francisco Morazán, San Pedro Sula, Honduras

21 August 1994
(UTC−06:00)
Day 3

Guatemala	5–6	Jamaica

Estadio Francisco Morazán, San Pedro Sula, Honduras
21 August 1994
(UTC−06:00)
Day 3

Costa Rica	5–1	Mexico

Estadio Francisco Morazán, San Pedro Sula, Honduras

=== Group C ===
Pos	Team	Pld	W	D	L	GF	GA	GD	Pts	Qualification
1	El Salvador	3	3	0	0	10	2	+8	9	Qualified to the Final phase
2	United States	3	2	0	1	9	4	+5	6	
3	Trinidad and Tobago	3	1	0	2	2	6	−4	3	
4	Guyana	3	0	0	3	1	10	−9	0	

18 August 1994
(UTC−06:00)
Day 1

El Salvador	2–1	Trinidad and Tobago

Estadio Excélsior, Puerto Cortés, Honduras
18 August 1994
(UTC−06:00)
Day 1

Guyana	1–4	United States

Estadio Excélsior, Puerto Cortés, Honduras

20 August 1994
(UTC−06:00)
Day 2

Guyana	0–1	Trinidad and Tobago

Estadio Excélsior, Puerto Cortés, Honduras
20 August 1994
(UTC−06:00)
Day 2

El Salvador	3–1	United States

Estadio Excélsior, Puerto Cortés, Honduras

22 August 1994
(UTC−06:00)
Day 3

El Salvador	5–0	Guyana

Estadio Excélsior, Puerto Cortés, Honduras
22 August 1994
(UTC−06:00)
Day 3

Trinidad and Tobago	0–4	United States

Estadio Excélsior, Puerto Cortés, Honduras

== Final phase ==
Pos	Team	Pld	W	D	L	GF	GA	GD	Pts	Qualification
1	Honduras	3	3	0	0	7	3	+4	9	Qualified to the 1995 FIFA World Youth Championship
2	Costa Rica	3	1	1	1	5	4	+1	4	Qualified to the 1995 FIFA World Youth Championship
3	Canada	3	1	0	2	5	7	−2	3	
4	El Salvador	3	0	1	2	4	7	−3	1	

24 August 1994
(UTC−06:00)
Day 1

Honduras	4–2	El Salvador
Cabrera 8'; Guevara 47' 79'; Oseguera 66'		Portillo 9' 73'

Estadio Tiburcio Carías Andino, Tegucigalpa, Honduras
24 August 1994
(UTC−06:00)
Day 1

Canada	2–4	Costa Rica
Thompson 7'; Xausa 18'	report

26 August 1994
(UTC−06:00)
Day 2

Honduras	2–1	Canada
	report	Xausa

26 August 1994
(UTC−06:00)
Day 2

Costa Rica	1–1	El Salvador
Wallace 43'		Portillo 9'

Estadio Francisco Morazán, San Pedro Sula, Honduras
Referee: René Parra (CAN)

28 August 1994
(UTC−06:00)
Day 3

Honduras	1–0	Costa Rica

28 August 1994
(UTC−06:00)
Day 3

Canada	2–1	El Salvador
Pizzolitto 21' 31'		Alvarado 43'

Estadio Tiburcio Carías Andino, Tegucigalpa, Honduras
Referee: Obando (GUA)

== Final ranking ==
Pos	Team	Pld	W	D	L	GF	GA	GD	Pts	Final result
1	Honduras (H)	6	6	0	0	18	6	+12	18	Champions
2	Costa Rica	6	4	1	1	18	7	+11	13	Runners-up
3	Canada	6	3	0	3	18	10	+8	9	Third place
4	El Salvador	6	3	1	2	14	9	+5	10	Fourth Place
5	United States	3	2	0	1	9	4	+5	6	Eliminated in Group stage
6	Mexico	3	2	0	1	8	6	+2	6	Eliminated in Group stage
7	Martinique	3	1	0	2	6	10	−4	3	Eliminated in Group stage
8	Trinidad and Tobago	3	1	0	2	2	6	−4	3	Eliminated in Group stage
9	Jamaica	3	1	0	2	8	13	−5	3	Eliminated in Group stage
10	Guatemala	3	0	0	3	6	13	−7	0	Eliminated in Group stage
11	Guyana	3	0	0	3	1	10	−9	0	Eliminated in Group stage
12	Belize	3	0	0	3	3	17	−14	0	Eliminated in Group stage

Source: rsssf.com
(H) Hosts

Note: Per statistical convention in football, matches decided in extra time are counted as wins and losses, while matches decided by penalty shoot-out are counted as draws.
