= 1992 CONCACAF U-20 Tournament =

Tournament details
- Host country: Canada
- Dates: 3–14 May
- Teams: 11

Final positions
- Champions: Mexico (10th title)
- Runners-up: United States
- Third place: Canada
- Fourth place: Honduras

The 1992 CONCACAF Under-20 Championship was held in Canada. It also served as qualification for the 1993 FIFA World Youth Championship.

== Teams ==
The following teams qualified for the tournament:

Region	Qualification Tournament	Qualifiers
Caribbean (CFU)	1992 CONCACAF U-20 Tournament qualifying	Cuba; Guadeloupe; Jamaica; Netherlands Antilles; Trinidad and Tobago
Caribbean (CFU)	Automatically qualified	Bermuda
Central America (UNCAF)	Automatically qualified	Costa Rica; Honduras
North America (NAFU)	Automatically qualified	Canada (host); Mexico; United States

== Round 1 ==
=== Group A ===
Teams	Pld	W	D	L	GF	GA	GD	Pts
Canada	2	2	0	0	9	3	+6	4
Cuba	2	1	0	1	4	5	–1	2
Guadeloupe	2	0	0	2	2	7	–5	0

3 May	Canada	4–2	Guadeloupe
5 May	Cuba	3–0	Guadeloupe
7 May	Canada	5–1	Cuba

=== Group B ===
In this group, Honduras qualified for the final round as best group runners-up.

Teams	Pld	W	D	L	GF	GA	GD	Pts
Mexico	3	2	1	0	7	1	+6	5
Honduras	3	2	1	0	6	1	+5	5
Jamaica	3	1	0	2	3	4	–1	2
Netherlands Antilles	3	0	0	3	0	10	–10	0

3 May	Mexico	5–0	Netherlands Antilles
	Jamaica	1–2	Honduras
5 May	Honduras	4–0	Netherlands Antilles
	Mexico	2–1	Jamaica
7 May	Jamaica	1–0	Netherlands Antilles
	Mexico	0–0	Honduras

=== Group C ===
Teams	Pld	W	D	L	GF	GA	GD	Pts
United States	3	3	0	0	9	0	+9	6
Costa Rica	3	1	1	1	4	2	+2	3
Trinidad and Tobago	3	0	2	1	0	2	–2	2
Bermuda	3	0	1	2	0	9	–9	1

3 May	United States	5–0	Bermuda
	Costa Rica	0–0	Trinidad and Tobago
5 May	Costa Rica	4–0	Bermuda
	United States	2–0	Trinidad and Tobago
7 May	Bermuda	0–0	Trinidad and Tobago
	United States	2–0	Costa Rica

== Final round ==
Teams	Pld	W	D	L	GF	GA	GD	Pts
Mexico	3	1	2	0	4	1	+3	4
United States	3	2	0	1	6	4	+2	4
Canada	3	1	1	1	3	3	0	3
Honduras	3	0	1	2	0	5	–5	1

10 May	Canada	1–0	Honduras
	Mexico	3–0	United States
12 May	Honduras	0–4	United States
	Canada	1–1	Mexico
14 May	Mexico	0–0	Honduras
	Canada	1–2	United States

1992 CONCACAF U-20 Championship

Mexico
Tenth title

== Qualification to World Youth Championship ==
The two best performing teams qualified for the 1993 FIFA World Youth Championship.

- Mexico
- United States

== See also ==
- 1992 CONCACAF U-20 Tournament qualifying
