= Matt Evans (footballer) =

Guatemalan footballer (born 2004)

Personal information
- Full name: Matthew Dominic Evans Wolff
- Date of birth: 25 May 2006 (age 20)
- Place of birth: Simi Valley, California, United States
- Height: 1.78 m (5 ft 10 in)
- Position: Attacking midfielder

Team information
- Current team: FC Wacker Innsbruck (on loan from Los Angeles FC)
- Number: 8

Youth career
- 2018–2023: Los Angeles FC

Senior career*
| Years | Team | Apps | (Gls) |
| 2023– | Los Angeles FC 2 | 64 | (17) |
| 2024– | Los Angeles FC | 1 | (0) |
| 2026– | → FC Wacker Innsbruck (loan) | 7 | (0) |

International career^{‡}
| 2023 | Guatemala U17 | 2 | (1) |
| 2023 | United States U17 | 3 | (0) |
| 2024 | Guatemala U18 | 4 | (1) |
| 2023–2024 | Guatemala U20 | 11 | (7) |
| 2025– | Guatemala U21 | 6 | (4) |
| 2025– | Guatemala | 11 | (2) |
Medal record
Men's football
Representing Guatemala
Central American Games
| Bronze medal – third place | 2025 Guatemala City |
- * Club domestic league appearances and goals as of 8:00, 19 September 2026 (UTC) ‡ National team caps and goals as of 20:40, 15 November 2026 (UTC)

Matthew Dominic Evans Wolff (born 25 May 2006) is a professional footballer who plays as an attacking midfielder for 2. Liga club FC Wacker Innsbruck, on loan from Major League Soccer (MLS) club Los Angeles FC. Born in the United States, he plays for the Guatemala national team.

== Club career ==
=== Los Angeles FC ===
Evans joined the youth academy of Los Angeles FC as a U12, and began his senior career with Los Angeles FC 2 in the MLS Next Pro in 2023. On 31 October 2024, he signed a professional Homegrown Player contract with the senior Los Angeles FC squad. He made the Los Angeles FC final squad for the 2025 FIFA Club World Cup.

Evans would make his Major League Soccer (MLS) debut on 11 April 2026, assisting during a 2–1 defeat against Portland Timbers.

==== Loan to FC Wacker Innsbruck ====
In July 2026, Evans was loaned out to Austrian 2. Liga club FC Wacker Innsbruck. Evans made his debut for FC Wacker Innsbruck on 25 July 2026 in the Austrian Cup against SVG Reichenau, scoring the third goal during the 3–0 win.

== International career ==
=== Youth career ===
Evans was born in the United States to an American father and Guatemalan mother and holds dual-citizenship. He played for the Guatemala U17s at the 2023 CONCACAF U-17 Championship. In September 2023, he instead was called up to a training camp with the United States U17s. He represented Guatemala U20 at the 2024 CONCACAF U-20 Championship. In October 2025, Evans was included in the Guatemala squad for the 2025 Central American Games hosted in Guatemala City. He would score a hat-trick within 15 minutes and assist in Guatemala's 4–2 win over El Salvador in the bronze medal match. Evans would also be awarded the Top Goal Scorer for the Central American Games, recording three goals.

=== Senior career ===
Evans debuted with the senior Guatemala national team in a 2026 FIFA World Cup qualification loss to Jamaica on 10 June 2025. In that same month, Evans was named to the squad for the 2025 CONCACAF Gold Cup, although he made no appearances. Evans scored his first international goal in Guatemala's 1–0 victory against Suriname in the 2026–27 CONCACAF Nations League A final group match, securing Guatemala a spot in the Quarter-finals for the first time in their history.

== Career statistics ==
=== International ===
As of match played 5 October 2026

Appearances and goals by national team and year
| National team | Year | Apps | Goals |
|---|---|---|---|
| Guatemala | 2025 | 2 | 0 |
| Guatemala | 2026 | 8 | 1 |
| Total | | 10 | 1 |

Scores and results list Guatemala's goal tally first, score column indicates score after each Evans goal.

List of international goals scored by Matt Evans
| No. | Date | Venue | Opponent | Score | Result | Competition |
|---|---|---|---|---|---|---|
| 1. | 5 October 2026 | Estadio Manuel Felipe Carrera, Guatemala City, Guatemala | Suriname | 1–0 | 1–0 | 2026–27 CONCACAF Nations League A |

== Honours ==
Guatemala Youth

- Central American Games Bronze Medal: 2025

Individual

- Central American Games top scorer: 2025
