= Gustavo Herrera (footballer) =

Panamanian football player (born 2005)

Personal information
- Full name: Gustavo Eloy Herrera Prescot
- Date of birth: 18 November 2005 (age 20)
- Place of birth: Colón, Panama
- Height: 1.81 m (5 ft 11 in)
- Position: Forward

Team information
- Current team: Saprissa (on loan from Sporting San Miguelito)
- Number: 9

Youth career
- Champions FC Academy

Senior career*
Years	Team	Apps	(Gls)
2023–	Sporting San Miguelito	7	(0)
2024–2025	→ Puebla (loan)	0	(0)
2025–	→ Saprissa (loan)	14	(1)

International career^{‡}
2024-	Panama U20	4	(3)
2024	Panama U23	6	(1)
2025–	Panama	1	(0)
- * Club domestic league appearances and goals as of 03:22, 13 March 2025 (UTC) ‡ National team caps and goals as of 03:22, 13 March 2025 (UTC)

Gustavo Eloy Herrera Prescot (born 18 November 2005) is a Panamanian football player who plays as forward for Saprissa, on loan from Sporting San Miguelito, and the Panama national team.

== Career ==
A youth product of Champions FC Academy, Herrera began his senior career with the Panamanian club Sporting San Miguelito in 2023. In 2023, he was also the top scorer for the Segunda División de Panamá with 20 goals with San Miguelito II. On 23 September 2024, he transferred to the Mexican club Puebla on loan until December 2025, and was assigned to their U23 side.

== International career ==
Herrera was part of the Panama U20s at the 2024 CONCACAF U-20 Championship. That same year he made the Panam U23s at the 2024 Maurice Revello Tournament. On 24 January 2025, he made his unofficial debut with the Panama national team in a friendly 2–1 loss to the Peruvian club Universitario de Deportes, scoring his side's only goal. On 8 February 2025, he debuted with the senior Panama national team as a substitute in a 6–1 friendly loss to Chile.
