= United States national under-17 soccer team =

United States national under-17 soccer team may refer to:

- United States men's national under-17 soccer team
- United States women's national under-17 soccer team
