= Santiago López (soccer, born 2005) =

Canadian soccer player (born 2005)

Personal information
- Full name: Santiago López López
- Date of birth: 10 June 2005 (age 21)
- Place of birth: Morelia, Mexico
- Height: 1.78 m (5 ft 10 in)
- Position: Forward

Team information
- Current team: Pumas UNAM
- Number: 30

Youth career
- Oakville SC
- 2019–: Pumas UNAM

Senior career*
Years	Team	Apps	(Gls)
2024–	Pumas UNAM	21	(0)
2026	→Atlético Ottawa (loan)	5	(0)

International career^{‡}
2023	Mexico U18	5	(0)
2024	Canada U20	7	(6)
- * Club domestic league appearances and goals as of October 24, 2026 ‡ National team caps and goals as of July 30, 2024

Santiago López López (born 10 June 2005) is a professional soccer player who plays as a forward for Liga MX club Pumas UNAM. Born in Mexico, he is a youth international for Canada.

== Early life ==
Born in Morelia, Mexico, López lived in Canada from 2009 to 2015, when his parents moved for work, before then returning to Mexico. In Canada, he played with Oakville SC. López joined the youth academy of UNAM in 2019 at the age of 13. He was the top scorer for the UNAM U18s in the 2023 Apertura with 10 goals.

== Club career ==
On 29 January 2024, he made his senior and professional debut with UNAM, as a substitute, in a 3–1 Liga MX win over Pachuca. On 6 February 2025, López scored his first goal in his first ever start for UNAM in their CONCACAF Champions Cup Round One match against Cavalry FC, putting them ahead 1-0 just before halftime.

On 16 April 2026, López was loaned out to Atlético Ottawa of the Canadian Premier League. He made his debut on 19 April, starting in a match against FC Supra du Québec.

== International career ==
López is a dual Mexican and Canadian citizen and is eligible for both national teams.

In August 2023, López was called up to the Mexico U18 for a set of friendlies.

In February 2024, López was called up to the Canada U20s for 2024 CONCACAF U-20 Championship qualifying matches. He made his debut on 23 February, scoring two goals in an 8–0 victory over Dominica U20. He finished the qualifying tournament with three goals in three games, helping Canada qualify for the main phase.

In July 2024, López was named to the final roster for the tournament. Although Canada were eliminated in the quarter-finals, he finished the competition as one of its top scorers and was named to the tournament's Best XI.

In October 2024, he was named to the Canada senior team for the first time, for a friendly match against Panama.
