= 2024 CONCACAF U-20 Championship =

Campeonato Sub-20 de la Concacaf 2024

Tournament details
- Host country: Mexico
- Dates: 19 July – 4 August
- Teams: 12 (from 1 confederation)
- Venues: 3 (in 3 host cities)

Final positions
- Champions: Mexico (14th title)
- Runners-up: United States

Tournament statistics
- Matches played: 25
- Goals scored: 82 (3.28 per match)
- Top scorer(s): (Canada) Santiago López (Guatemala) Olger Escobar (Honduras) Anfronit Tatum (Panama) Gustavo Herrera (Panama) Rafael Mosquera (United States) David Vazquez (3 goals each)
- Best player: (United States) Niko Tsakiris
- Best goalkeeper: (Cuba) Yurdy Hodelin
- Fair play award: United States

The 2024 CONCACAF Under-20 Championship was the eighth edition of the CONCACAF Under-20 Championship (29th edition if all eras included), the men's under-20 international football tournament organized by CONCACAF. It was held in Mexico from 19 July to 4 August 2024.

The tournament featured a reduction in the number of participating teams following the format changes adopted by CONCACAF in February 2023. It was contested by 12 teams instead of the 20 that participated in previous editions.

Same as previous editions, the tournament acted as the CONCACAF qualifiers for the FIFA U-20 World Cup. The top four teams of the tournament (the four semi-finalists) qualified for the 2025 FIFA U-20 World Cup in Chile as the CONCACAF representatives.

The United States were the three-time defending champions.

== Competition format ==
In February 2023, CONCACAF announced format changes for its youth competitions approved by its council. The following changes were adopted for the U-17 and U-20 Championships compared to previous editions:

- The number of teams automatically qualified for the final tournament was reduced to 6 from the 16 that previously qualified. These were the six top-ranked teams according to the CONCACAF Men's Under-20 Ranking while the teams ranked between 7 and 41 had to participate in qualifying stage.
- The group stage consisted of three groups instead of the four groups that were previously played. This stage included the six pre-seeded teams into this round and the six teams coming from the qualifying stage.
- The round of 16 was removed from the knockout stage, which started directly with the quarter-finals.

The tournament was divided into two stages: the group stage and the knockout stage. The group stage featured twelve teams, including the six top-ranked teams that qualified directly and the six teams that qualified via the qualifying round. The twelve teams were split into three groups of four, and competed in a single round-robin. Eight teams, the top two teams of each group and the two-best third-placed teams, advanced to the knockout stage, which was played on a single-elimination format and consisted of the quarter-finals, semi-finals and the final. The quarter-final winners advanced to the semi-finals and qualified for the 2025 FIFA U-20 World Cup. The semi-final winners played the final to determine the champion.

== Host nation and venues ==
Location of the host cities of the 2024 CONCACAF U-20 Championship.

- 1 Celaya
- 2 Irapuato
- 3 León

Mexico was appointed as the host country for the tournament by CONCACAF on 26 February 2024, with the Estadio Miguel Alemán Valdés in Celaya and the Estadio Sergio León Chávez in Irapuato, both located in the state of Guanajuato, as the two initial venues. After a police officer was killed outside of the Cuban team hotel on 24 July 2024, all further matches scheduled to be played in Celaya were moved to the Estadio León in León, also located in Guanajuato, and no further matches took place in Celaya.

Celaya	Irapuato	León
Estadio Miguel Alemán Valdés	Estadio Sergio León Chávez	Estadio León
Capacity: 23,182	Capacity: 25,000	Capacity: 31,297

== Teams ==
=== Qualification ===
The U-20 Championship qualifying featured a new format approved by the CONCACAF Council in February 2023. The qualifying groups were increased to six instead of the four from previous editions, with the six group winners qualifying for the final tournament.

A total of 27 (out of 41) CONCACAF national teams entered the qualifying round, which took place from 23 February to 2 March 2024.

The six teams from the qualifying round joined the six top-ranked teams (based on the CONCACAF men's under-20 rankings as of 12 June 2023) in the group stage of the final tournament for a total of 12 qualified teams.

Qualified teams
Team	Qualification	Appearances		Previous best performance
Team	Qualification	Total	Last	Previous best performance
United States (title holders)	1st ranked entrant	26th	2022	Champions (2017, 2018, 2022)
Honduras	2nd ranked entrant	21st	2022	Champions (1982, 1994)
Mexico (hosts)	3rd ranked entrant	28th	2022	Champions (1962, 1970, 1973, 1974, 1976, 1978, 1980, 1984, 1990, 1992, 2011, 2013, 2015)
Panama	4th ranked entrant	13th	2022	Runners-up (2015)
Costa Rica	5th ranked entrant	22nd	2022	Champions (1988, 2009)
Dominican Republic	6th ranked entrant	7th	2022	Runners-up (2022)
Cuba	Qualifying Group A winner	15th	2022	Runners-up (1970, 1974)
El Salvador	Qualifying Group B winner	19th	2022	Champions (1964)
Guatemala	Qualifying Group C winner	21st	2022	Runners-up (1962, 1973)
Canada	Qualifying Group D winner	25th	2022	Champions (1986, 1996)
Haiti	Qualifying Group E winner	11th	2022	Second round/Round of 16 (1978/2022)
Jamaica	Qualifying Group F winner	22nd	2022	Third place (1970)

=== Squads ===
Each team was required to register a squad of up to 21 players, three of whom had to be goalkeepers. Players born between 1 January 2005 and 31 December 2009 (ages 15 to 19) were eligible to compete in the tournament (Regulations Articles 9 and 10).

== Draw ==
The draw for the groups composition was held on 11 April 2024, 12:00 EDT (UTC−4), at the CONCACAF Headquarters in Miami, Florida, United States. The 12 involved teams were drawn into three groups of four. Prior to the draw, the 12 teams had been seeded into four pots of three based on the CONCACAF Men's Under-20 Ranking updated after the completion of the qualifying stage (as of 3 March 2024), with the six teams that entered directly into the group stage being placed into pots 1 and 2 and the six teams coming from the qualifying process being placed into pots 3 and 4.

Pot 1
Rank	Team	Pts
1	United States	4,897
2	Honduras	3,197
3	Mexico	2,794

Pot 2
Rank	Team	Pts
4	Panama	2,442
7	Dominican Republic	1,932
8	Costa Rica	1,779

Pot 3
Rank	Team	Pts
5	Guatemala	2,284
6	El Salvador	1,945
9	Cuba	1,692

Pot 4
Rank	Team	Pts
10	Jamaica	1,638
11	Haiti	1,609
12	Canada	1,589

The draw started with pot 1 and teams were placed in the first position of Groups A, B, and C according to the order they are drawn. The same procedure was followed to draw pots 2, 3 and 4, with pot 2 teams being placed in second position within their group, pot 3 teams in third position and pot 4 teams in fourth position.

The groups formed as a result of the draw were as follows:

Group A
Pos	Team
A1	United States
A2	Costa Rica
A3	Cuba
A4	Jamaica

Group B
Pos	Team
B1	Honduras
B2	Dominican Republic
B3	El Salvador
B4	Canada

Group C
Pos	Team
C1	Mexico
C2	Panama
C3	Guatemala
C4	Haiti

== Group stage ==
The top two teams of each group and the two-best third-placed teams advanced to the quarter-finals.

=== Tiebreakers ===
The ranking of teams in each group was determined as follows (Regulations Article 12.7):

1. Points obtained in all group matches (three points for a win, one for a draw, zero for a loss).
2. Goal difference in all group matches.
3. Number of goals scored in all group matches.

If two or more teams were still tied after applying the above criteria, their rankings were determined as follows:

1. Points obtained in matches played between the tied teams.
2. Goal difference in matches played between the tied teams.
3. Number of goals scored in matches played between the tied teams.
4. Lower number of disciplinary points based on the number of yellow and red cards in all group matches, according the following additions:
  - Yellow card: 1 point
  - Indirect red card (second yellow card): 3 points
  - Direct red card: 4 points
  - Yellow card and direct red card: 5 points
5. Drawing of lots.

The fixture list was confirmed by CONCACAF on 11 April 2024, after the draw. All kick-off times are local times, CST (UTC−6), and the Eastern Daylight Time (UTC−4) are in parentheses, as listed by CONCACAF.

=== Group A ===
Following the incident that led to the change of venue from Celaya to León, the third round matches in Group A were moved from 25 to 26 July.

Pos	Team	Pld	W	D	L	GF	GA	GD	Pts	Qualification
1	United States	3	3	0	0	14	0	+14	9	Advance to knockout stage
2	Costa Rica	3	1	1	1	4	2	+2	4	Advance to knockout stage
3	Cuba	3	1	1	1	4	5	−1	4	Advance to knockout stage
4	Jamaica	3	0	0	3	0	15	−15	0	

Source: CONCACAF
Rules for classification: tiebreakers
19 July 2024
17:06 (19:06 EDT)

Costa Rica	1–1	Cuba
Cruz 52'	Report	Rodríguez 8' (pen.)

Estadio Miguel Alemán Valdés, Celaya
Referee: Myriam Marcotte (Canada)
19 July 2024
20:06 (22:06 EDT)

United States	9–0	Jamaica
Vazquez 2', 3'; Soma 16', 20'; Medina 39'; Zambrano 54'; Ramos 67'; Berchimas 77'; Tsakiris 90+1'	Report

Estadio Miguel Alemán Valdés, Celaya
Referee: Adonis Carrasco (Dominican Republic)

22 July 2024
17:06 (19:06 EDT)

Jamaica	0–3	Costa Rica
	Report	Montero 50' (pen.); A. Rojas 67', 83'

Estadio Miguel Alemán Valdés, Celaya
Referee: Fernando Hernández (Mexico)
22 July 2024
20:06 (22:06 EDT)

Cuba	0–4	United States
	Report	Kohler 15'; Gozo 26'; Habroune 58'; Zambrano 90+1'

Estadio Miguel Alemán Valdés, Celaya
Referee: Filip Dujic (Canada)

26 July 2024
14:06 (16:06 EDT) (Note: Match originally scheduled on 25 July, 17:06 local time and later rescheduled to 26 July, 14:06 local time.)

Cuba	3–0	Jamaica
Camejo 35'; D. Pérez 42'; K. Pérez 86' (pen.)	Report

Estadio León, León
Referee: Karen Hernández (Mexico)
26 July 2024
18:30 (20:30 EDT) (Note: Match originally scheduled on 25 July, 20:06 local time and later rescheduled to 26 July, 18:30 local time.)

United States	1–0	Costa Rica
Tsakiris 37'	Report

Estadio León, León
Referee: Jefferson Escobar (Honduras)

=== Group B ===
Pos	Team	Pld	W	D	L	GF	GA	GD	Pts	Qualification
1	Honduras	3	2	1	0	11	5	+6	7	Advance to knockout stage
2	Canada	3	2	1	0	5	3	+2	7	Advance to knockout stage
3	El Salvador	3	1	0	2	3	6	−3	3	
4	Dominican Republic	3	0	0	3	2	7	−5	0	

Source: CONCACAF
Rules for classification: tiebreakers
20 July 2024
17:06 (19:06 EDT)

Dominican Republic	0–1	El Salvador
	Report	Argueta 62'

Estadio Sergio León Chávez, Irapuato
Referee: Fernando Morón (Panama)
20 July 2024
20:06 (22:06 EDT)

Honduras	2–2	Canada
Villatoro 55'; Osorto 90+4'	Report	López 17'; Morgan 43'

Estadio Sergio León Chávez, Irapuato
Referee: Kwinsi Williams (Trinidad and Tobago)

23 July 2024
17:06 (19:06 EDT)

Canada	1–0	Dominican Republic
Ciccarelli 86'	Report

Estadio Sergio León Chávez, Irapuato
Referee: David Gómez (Costa Rica)
23 July 2024
20:06 (22:06 EDT)

El Salvador	1–4	Honduras
N. Díaz 40'	Report	D. Guardado 45+1' (o.g.); Moncada 53'; Tatum 66', 84'

Estadio Sergio León Chávez, Irapuato
Referee: Cristopher Corado (Guatemala)

26 July 2024
16:06 (18:06 EDT) (Note: Match originally scheduled at 17:06 local time and later rescheduled to 16:06 local time.)

El Salvador	1–2	Canada
Castillo 77'	Report	López 21'; Bunbury 90+3'

Estadio Sergio León Chávez, Irapuato
Referee: Fernando Morón (Panama)
26 July 2024
20:30 (22:30 EDT) (Note: Match originally scheduled at 20:06 local time and later rescheduled to 20:30 local time.)

Honduras	5–2	Dominican Republic
Ponce 13' (pen.); Paguada 44', 76'; Vásquez 90'; Martínez 90+2'	Report	Roces 86'; Concepción 90+3'

Estadio Sergio León Chávez, Irapuato
Referee: Hakeem Harvey (Saint Kitts and Nevis)

=== Group C ===
Pos	Team	Pld	W	D	L	GF	GA	GD	Pts	Qualification
1	Mexico (H)	3	2	1	0	7	2	+5	7 (Note: Disciplinary points: Mexico 4, Panama 5.)	Advance to knockout stage
2	Panama	3	2	1	0	7	2	+5	7	Advance to knockout stage
3	Guatemala	3	1	0	2	6	6	0	3	Advance to knockout stage
4	Haiti	3	0	0	3	2	12	−10	0	

Source: CONCACAF
Rules for classification: tiebreakers
(H) Hosts
Notes:
21 July 2024
16:06 (18:06 EDT)

Panama	3–0	Guatemala
G. Herbert 5'; Herrera 35', 38'	Report

Estadio Sergio León Chávez, Irapuato
Referee: Hakeem Harvey (St. Kitts and Nevis)
21 July 2024
19:06 (21:06 EDT)

Mexico	4–0	Haiti
Padilla 12'; Jurado 72'; Biscayzacú 78'; Morales 90+6'	Report

Estadio Sergio León Chávez, Irapuato
Referee: Filiberto Martínez (El Salvador)

24 July 2024
17:06 (19:06 EDT)

Haiti	1–3	Panama
Destin 86'	Report	Herrera 16'; Walters 32'; Mosquera 45+7' (pen.)

Estadio Sergio León Chávez, Irapuato
Referee: Crystal Sobers (Trinidad and Tobago)
24 July 2024
20:06 (22:06 EDT)

Guatemala	1–2	Mexico
Sagastume 56' (pen.)	Report	Méndez 29'; Domínguez 45+4' (pen.)

Estadio Sergio León Chávez, Irapuato
Referee: Victor Rivas (United States)

27 July 2024
17:06 (19:06 EDT)

Guatemala	5–1	Haiti
Escobar 17' (pen.), 26', 48'; Evans 38'; Ávila 45+1'	Report	Destin 55' (pen.)

Estadio Sergio León Chávez, Irapuato
Referee: Filiberto Martínez (El Salvador)
27 July 2024
20:06 (22:06 EDT)

Mexico	1–1	Panama
Carrillo 90'	Report	Saldaña 16'

Estadio Sergio León Chávez, Irapuato
Referee: Kwinsi Williams (Trinidad and Tobago)

=== Ranking of third-placed teams ===
Pos	Grp	Team	Pld	W	D	L	GF	GA	GD	Pts	Qualification
1	A	Cuba	3	1	1	1	4	5	−1	4	Advance to knockout stage
2	C	Guatemala	3	1	0	2	6	6	0	3	Advance to knockout stage
3	B	El Salvador	3	1	0	2	3	6	−3	3	

Source: CONCACAF
Rules for classification: tiebreakers

== Knockout stage ==
In the knockout stage, if a match was tied at the end of normal playing time, extra time was played (two periods of 15 minutes each) followed, if necessary, by a penalty shoot-out to determine the winners (Regulations Article 12.11).

=== Bracket ===
Quarter-finals
30 July – León
United States	1
Guatemala	0
30 July – León
Panama (a.e.t.)	2
Canada	1
31 July – Irapuato
Honduras	1 (3)
Cuba (p)	1 (5)
31 July – Irapuato
Mexico	2
Costa Rica	1

Semi-finals
2 August – León
United States	2
Panama	1
2 August – León
Cuba	0
Mexico	2

Final
4 August – León
United States	1
Mexico (a.e.t.)	2

=== Quarter-finals ===
The quarter-final winners qualified for the 2025 FIFA U-20 World Cup.

30 July 2024
15:06

United States	1–0	Guatemala
Ramos 49'	Report

Estadio León, León
Referee: Fernando Hernández (Mexico)

30 July 2024
20:06

Panama	2–1 (a.e.t.)	Canada
Mosquera 68' (pen.); Modelo 95'	Report	López 78'

Estadio León, León
Referee: Hakeem Harvey (Saint Kitts and Nevis)

31 July 2024
17:06

Mexico	2–1	Costa Rica
Sánchez 39'; Morales 83'	Report	Montero 29' (pen.)

Estadio Sergio León Chávez, Irapuato
Referee: Cristopher Corado (Guatemala)

31 July 2024
20:06

Honduras	1–1 (a.e.t.)	Cuba
Tatum 79'	Report	Rodríguez 60' (pen.)
Penalties
Vásquez (penalty scored); Villatoro (penalty scored); Cruz (penalty missed); Martínez (penalty scored)	3–5	(penalty scored) K. Pérez; (penalty scored) Mena; (penalty scored) Torres; (penalty scored) Camejo; (penalty scored) Reinoso

Estadio Sergio León Chávez, Irapuato
Referee: Adonis Carrasco (Dominican Republic)

=== Semi-finals ===
2 August 2024
15:06

United States	2–1	Panama
Vazquez 40'; Raines 86'	Report	Mosquera 72' (pen.)

Estadio León, León
Referee: David Gómez (Costa Rica)

2 August 2024
20:06

Cuba	0–2	Mexico
	Report	Levy 4'; D. Ochoa 7'

Estadio León, León
Referee: Filip Dujic (Canada)

=== Final ===
4 August 2024
15:06

United States	1–2 (a.e.t.)	Mexico
Berchimas 52'	Report	Levy 90+7'; D. Ochoa 120+1'

Estadio León, León
Referee: Kwinsi Williams (Trinidad and Tobago)

== Goalscorers ==
There were 82 goals scored in 25 matches, for an average of 3.28 goals per match.

3 goals

- (Canada) Santiago López
- (Guatemala) Olger Escobar
- (Honduras) Anfronit Tatum
- (Panama) Gustavo Herrera
- (Panama) Rafael Mosquera
- (United States) David Vazquez

2 goals

- (Costa Rica) Claudio Montero
- (Costa Rica) Andy Rojas
- (Cuba) Samuel Rodríguez
- (Haiti) Bryan Destin
- (Honduras) Didier Paguada
- (Mexico) Mateo Levy
- (Mexico) Amaury Morales
- (Mexico) Diego Ochoa
- (United States) Nimfasha Berchimas
- (United States) Ruben Ramos
- (United States) Pedro Soma
- (United States) Niko Tsakiris
- (United States) Marcos Zambrano

1 goal

- (Canada) Mataeo Bunbury
- (Canada) Tavio Ciccarelli
- (Canada) Myles Morgan
- (Costa Rica) Esteban Cruz
- (Cuba) Michael Camejo
- (Cuba) David Pérez
- (Cuba) Karel Pérez
- (Dominican Republic) Elian Concepción
- (Dominican Republic) Javier Roces
- (El Salvador) Christopher Argueta
- (El Salvador) Francis Castillo
- (El Salvador) Nelson Díaz
- (Guatemala) Marvin Ávila
- (Guatemala) Matthew Evans
- (Guatemala) Selvin Sagastume
- (Honduras) Jefry Martínez
- (Honduras) Dereck Moncada
- (Honduras) Roberto Osorto
- (Honduras) Justin Ponce
- (Honduras) Mathias Vásquez
- (Honduras) Ángel Villatoro
- (Mexico) Xavier Biscayzacú
- (Mexico) Stephano Carrillo
- (Mexico) Alexéi Domínguez
- (Mexico) Heriberto Jurado
- (Mexico) Francisco Méndez
- (Mexico) Yael Padilla
- (Mexico) Diego Sánchez
- (Panama) Giovany Herber
- (Panama) Aimar Modelo
- (Panama) Allan Saldaña
- (Panama) Kairo Walters
- (United States) Zavier Gozo
- (United States) Taha Habroune
- (United States) Ethan Kohler
- (United States) Cruz Medina
- (United States) Brooklyn Raines

1 own goal

- (El Salvador) Diego Guardado (against Honduras)

Source: CONCACAF

== Qualified teams for FIFA U-20 World Cup ==
The following four teams from CONCACAF qualified for the 2025 FIFA U-20 World Cup in Chile.

Team	Qualified on	Previous appearances in FIFA U-20 World Cup
United States	30 July 2024	17 (1981, 1983, 1987, 1989, 1993, 1997, 1999, 2001, 2003, 2005, 2007, 2009, 2013, 2015, 2017, 2019, 2023)
Panama	30 July 2024	6 (2003, 2005, 2007, 2011, 2015, 2019)
Mexico	31 July 2024	16 (1977, 1979, 1981, 1983, 1985, 1991, 1993, 1997, 1999, 2003, 2007, 2011, 2013, 2015, 2017, 2019)
Cuba	31 July 2024	1 (2013)
