= Eduardo Arce =

Mexican footballer and manager (born 1989)

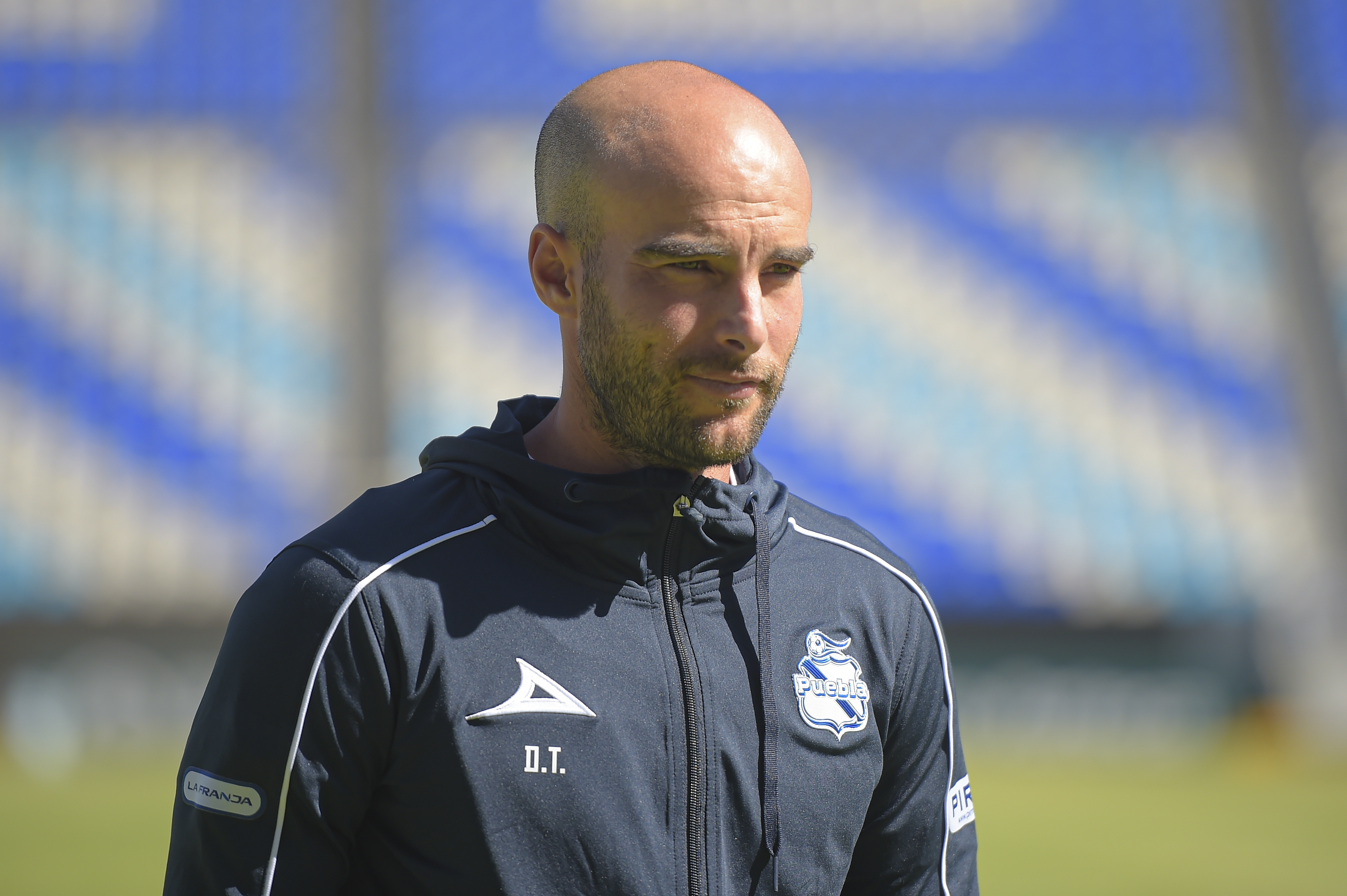
- Arce with Puebla in 2022

Personal information
- Full name: Eduardo Arce Peña
- Date of birth: 25 January 1989 (age 37)
- Place of birth: Toluca, Mexico
- Position: Midfielder

Team information
- Current team: Mexico U23 (head coach)

Senior career*
Years	Team	Apps	(Gls)
2007–2009	Toluca	0	(0)
2007–2009	Atlético Mexiquense	10	(0)
2009	Atlante UTN	5	(0)
2009–2011	Atlante	2	(0)
2013–2014	Puebla	25	(0)
2015	Tepic	1	(0)

Managerial career
- 2017–2019: Puebla (academy)
- 2019: UNAM (academy)
- 2019–2020: Celaya (assistant)
- 2020: Puebla (academy)
- 2021–2022: Puebla (assistant)
- 2023: Puebla
- 2023–2025: Mexico U20
- 2025–2026: Mexico U21
- 2026–: Mexico U23
Medal record
Men's football
Representing Mexico
CONCACAF U-20 Championship
Winner	2024 Mexico
- * Club domestic league appearances and goals

Eduardo Arce Peña (born 25 January 1989) is a Mexican manager and former professional footballer who is the current head coach of the Mexico under-23 national team.

== Personal life ==
Arce is the cousin of fellow footballer Luis Arce Crespo.

== Managerial statistics ==
As of match played 7 October 2025

Managerial record by team and tenure
Team	From	To	Record				
Team	From	To	P	W	D	L	Win %
Puebla	18 November 2022	23 August 2023	25	7	3	15	28.00
Mexico U20	14 December 2023	Present	28	10	10	8	35.71
Total			53	17	13	23	32.08

== Honours ==
=== Manager ===
Mexico U20

- CONCACAF Under-20 Championship: 2024
