= CONCACAF Under-20 Championship =

- Organizer(s): CONCACAF
- Founded: 1962
- Region: North America
- Teams: 35
- Current champion(s): Mexico (15th title)
- Most championships: Mexico (15 titles)
- Website: Official website
- 2026 CONCACAF U-20 Championship

The CONCACAF Under-20 Championship is the second longest running international association football event in the North America, Central America and the Caribbean region, CONCACAF, and is the qualification tournament for the FIFA U-20 World Cup. The format of the tournament has undergone changes over the years. The tournament proper is currently played with a first round of four round-robin groups from which the top two sides from each group advance to a single-elimination championship round.

== Results ==
=== CONCACAF Youth Tournaments era ===
Edition	Year	Host	Champions	Runners-up	Third place	Fourth place
1	1962	Panama	Mexico	Guatemala	Netherlands Antilles	Costa Rica
2	1964	Guatemala	El Salvador	Honduras	Guatemala	Netherlands Antilles
3	1970	Cuba	Mexico	Cuba	Jamaica	El Salvador
4	1973	Mexico	Mexico	Guatemala	Cuba	Canada
5	1974	Canada	Mexico	Cuba	Trinidad and Tobago	
6	1976	Puerto Rico	Mexico	Honduras	United States	Guatemala
7	1978	Honduras	Mexico	Canada	Honduras	Costa Rica
8	1980	United States	Mexico	United States		
9	1982	Guatemala	Honduras	United States	Costa Rica	Guatemala
10	1984	Trinidad and Tobago	Mexico	Canada	El Salvador	United States
11	1986	Trinidad and Tobago	Canada	United States	Trinidad and Tobago	Cuba
12	1988	Guatemala	Costa Rica	Mexico	United States	Cuba
13	1990	Guatemala	Mexico	Trinidad and Tobago	United States	Guatemala
14	1992	Canada	Mexico	United States	Canada	Honduras
15	1994	Honduras	Honduras	Costa Rica	Canada	El Salvador
16	1996	Mexico	Canada	Mexico	United States	Costa Rica

=== FIFA U-20 World Cup qualifying tournament era ===
The format of the tournament was changed beginning with the 1998 tournament and ending with the 2007 tournament. In the five tournaments during that time the top eight teams in the region were divided into two groups of four, each group hosted by a separate nation, and the top two sides from each group qualified for the FIFA U-20 World Cup. There was no championship round within the CONCACAF region. The tournament served solely to qualify the four allotments given to CONCACAF by FIFA for the U-20 World Cup.

Edition	Year	Host	Champions	Runners-up
17	1998	Guatemala (group A)	United States	Costa Rica
17	1998	(Trinidad and Tobago) Trinidad (group B)	Mexico	Honduras
18	2001	Canada (group A)	Costa Rica	United States
18	2001	(Trinidad and Tobago) Trinidad (group B)	Canada	Jamaica
19	2003	Panama (group A)	Panama	Mexico
19	2003	United States (group B)	Canada	United States
20	2005	United States (group A)	United States	Panama
20	2005	Honduras (group B)	Canada	Honduras
21	2007	Panama (group A)	United States	Panama
21	2007	Mexico (group B)	Mexico	Costa Rica

=== CONCACAF U-20 Championship era ===
Beginning with the 2009 FIFA U-20 World Cup tournament, the CONCACAF region returned to a championship-style tournament in which all four semifinalists qualify for the FIFA U-20 World Cup. The reintroduction of a championship round was done to reinvigorate the competition.

Edition	Year	Host	Champions	Runners-up	Third place	Fourth place
22	2009	Trinidad and Tobago	Costa Rica	United States	Honduras	Trinidad and Tobago
23	2011	Guatemala	Mexico	Costa Rica	Guatemala	Panama
24	2013	Mexico	Mexico	United States	El Salvador	Cuba

The competition changed its format in 2015. The two group winners would secure a place in the final and the U-20 World Cup, the groups' second and third placed teams would compete in a repechage play-off to determine the qualifiers for the U-20 World Cup. The number of guaranteed matches per team was increased from two to five and the semi-final stage was removed.

Edition	Year	Host	Champions	Runners-up	Play-off winners	
25	2015	Jamaica	Mexico	Panama	United States	Honduras

The competition changed its format again in 2017. A second group stage was added, with the winners and runners-up of this stage qualifying for the U-20 World Cup and the winners securing a place in the final.

Edition	Year	Host	Champions	Runners-up	Group runners-up	
26	2017	Costa Rica	United States	Honduras	Mexico	Costa Rica
27	2018	United States	United States	Mexico	Honduras	Panama

The competition changed its format again in 2020. A knockout stage was added, with the semi-finalists qualifying for the U-20 World Cup.

Edition	Year	Host	Champions	Runners-up	Semi-finalists	
~~28~~	2020	Honduras	Cancelled due to COVID-19 pandemic			
28	2022	Honduras	United States	Dominican Republic	Guatemala	Honduras
29	2024	Mexico	Mexico	United States	Cuba	Panama
30	2026	Mexico	Mexico	United States	Canada	Costa Rica

== Winners by country ==
Team	Titles	Runners-up
Mexico	15 (1962, 1970, 1973, 1974, 1976, 1978, 1980, 1984, 1990, 1992, 2011, 2013, 2015, 2024, 2026)	3 (1988, 1996, 2018)
United States	3 (2017, 2018, 2022)	8 (1980, 1982, 1986, 1992, 2009, 2013, 2024, 2026)
Honduras	2 (1982, 1994)	3 (1964, 1976, 2017)
Canada	2 (1986, 1996)	2 (1978, 1984)
Costa Rica	2 (1988, 2009)	2 (1994, 2011)
El Salvador	1 (1964)	—
Guatemala	—	2 (1962, 1973)
Cuba	—	2 (1970, 1974)
Trinidad and Tobago	—	1 (1990)
Panama	—	1 (2015)
Dominican Republic	—	1 (2022)

Note: no championship titles or runners-ups between 1998 and 2007.

== Overall team records ==
In this ranking 3 points are awarded for a win, 1 for a draw and 0 for a loss. As per statistical convention in football, matches decided in extra time are counted as wins and losses, while matches decided by penalty shoot-outs are counted as draws. Teams are ranked by total points, then by goal difference, then by goals scored.

As of 2026 CONCACAF U-20 Championship

Rank	Team	Part	Pld	W	D	L	GF	GA	GD	Pts
1	Mexico	29	141	105	24	12	381	80	301	339
2	United States	27	134	86	19	29	326	103	223	277
3	Honduras	22	102	63	17	22	213	102	111	206
4	Canada	26	110	54	22	34	207	119	88	184
5	Costa Rica	23	98	54	18	26	208	99	109	180
6	Guatemala	22	99	33	19	47	119	148	−29	118
7	El Salvador	20	84	31	15	38	124	124	0	108
8	Panama	14	52	29	10	13	91	59	32	97
9	Trinidad and Tobago	21	83	24	22	37	109	150	−41	94
10	Cuba	16	70	26	14	30	88	98	−10	92
11	Jamaica	23	81	18	19	44	93	152	−59	73
12	Haiti	12	39	11	8	20	56	78	−22	41
13	Netherlands Antilles	11	41	10	6	25	36	97	−61	36
14	Bermuda	13	39	8	5	26	46	91	−45	29
16	Suriname	7	22	8	0	14	38	53	−15	24
16	Dominican Republic	7	26	8	0	18	43	88	−45	24
17	Nicaragua	10	32	4	6	22	18	101	−83	18
18	Puerto Rico	9	22	4	0	18	21	100	−79	12
19	Antigua and Barbuda	6	19	3	2	14	18	53	−35	11
20	Guadeloupe	3	9	3	0	6	12	20	−8	9
21	Guyana	3	13	3	0	10	13	31	−18	9
22	Grenada	4	13	2	1	10	12	46	−34	7
23	Curaçao	3	7	2	0	5	11	9	2	6
24	Dominica	1	5	2	0	3	5	14	−9	6
25	Martinique	3	11	2	0	9	10	29	−19	6
26	Barbados	6	20	1	2	17	15	54	−39	5
27	Aruba	3	13	1	2	10	9	50	−41	5
28	Cayman Islands	1	4	1	1	2	8	11	−3	4
29	Saint Kitts and Nevis	4	11	1	1	9	10	36	−26	4
30	Saint Vincent and the Grenadines	1	5	1	0	4	8	15	−7	3
31	Belize	2	8	1	0	7	8	36	−28	3
32	Saint Lucia	1	4	0	1	3	0	10	−10	1
33	Saint Martin	1	5	0	1	4	3	23	−20	1
34	Sint Maarten	1	5	0	0	5	4	41	−37	0
35	U.S. Virgin Islands	1	5	0	0	5	2	40	−38	0

== Comprehensive team results by tournament ==
Legend

- 1st – Champions
- 2nd – Runners-up
- 3rd – Third place
- 4th – Fourth place
- SF – Semi-finals (Note: The third-place match was not played in 1980, 2022, 2024 or 2026.)
- 5th – Fifth place (Note: 1970 was played as a round-robin tournament between five teams.)
- Top4 – Top four (no knockout stage)
- QF – Quarter-finals
- R16 – Round of 16
- GS – Group stage
- R1 – First round (first group stage)
- R2 – Second round (second group stage)
- FS – Final stage (group stage)
- Q – Qualified for upcoming tournament
- — Hosts
- • – Did not qualify
- × – Did not enter
- × – Withdrew before qualification
- — Withdrew/Disqualified after qualification
- — Team did not exist
- — Not part of CONCACAF

Team	(Panama) 1962 (9)	(Guatemala) 1964 (9)	(Cuba) 1970 (5)	(Mexico) 1973 (6)	(Canada) 1974 (12)	(Puerto Rico) 1976 (15)	(Honduras) 1978 (13)	(United States) 1980 (18)	(Guatemala) 1982 (12)	(Trinidad and Tobago) 1984 (16)	(Trinidad and Tobago) 1986 (12)	(Guatemala) 1988 (10)	(Guatemala) 1990 (12)	(Canada) 1992 (11)	(Honduras) 1994 (12)	(Mexico) 1996 (12)	(Guatemala) (Trinidad and Tobago) 1998 (8)	(Canada) (Trinidad and Tobago) 2001 (8)	(Panama) (United States) 2003 (8)	(Honduras) (United States) 2005 (8)	(Mexico) (Panama) 2007 (8)	(Trinidad and Tobago) 2009 (8)	(Guatemala) 2011 (12)	(Mexico) 2013 (12)	(Jamaica) 2015 (12)	(Costa Rica) 2017 (12)	(United States) 2018 (34)	(Honduras) ~~2020~~ ~~(20)~~	(Honduras) 2022 (20)	(Mexico) 2024 (12)	(Mexico) 2026 (12)	Total
North American Football Union (NAFU) members
Canada	×	×	×	4th	QF	R2	2nd	SF	R2	2nd	1st	GS	GS	3rd	3rd	1st	FS	Top4	Top4	Top4	×	GS	QF	QF	GS	R1	GS	~~Q~~	R16	QF	SF	26+1
Mexico	1st	GS	1st	1st	1st	1st	1st	1st	×	1st	GS	2nd	1st	1st	GS	2nd	Top4	FS	Top4	FS	Top4	GS	1st	1st	1st	SF	2nd	~~Q~~	QF	1st	1st	29+1
United States	×	GS	×	×	QF	3rd	R2	2nd	2nd	4th	2nd	2nd	3rd	2nd	GS	3rd	Top4	Top4	Top4	Top4	Top4	2nd	QF	2nd	SF	1st	1st	~~Q~~	1st	2nd	2nd	27+1
Central American Football Union (UNCAF) members
Belize											•/×	×	•	×	GS	•/×	×	•	×	×	•	•	•	×	•	×	GS	•	•	•	•	2
Costa Rica	4th	×	×	×	GS	×	4th	GS	3rd	R2	•/×	1st	GS	GS	2nd	4th	Top4	Top4	•	FS	Top4	1st	2nd	QF	•	SF	QF	~~Q~~	QF	QF	SF	23+1
El Salvador	GS	1st	4th	×	×	R1	R2	GS	R2	3rd	•/×	•/×	GS	×	4th	R1	•	•	FS	•	•	GS	•	3rd	QF	R2	QF	~~Q~~	R16	GS	GS	20+1
Guatemala	2nd	3rd	×	2nd	GS	4th	×	QF	4th	R1	•/×	GS	4th	×	GS	R2	FS	FS	FS	•	FS	•	3rd	•	QF	•	GS	~~Q~~	SF	QF	QF	22+1
Honduras	GS	2nd	×	×	×	2nd	3rd	SF	1st	R2	•/×	•	GS	4th	1st	R1	Top4	FS	•	Top4	•	3rd	QF	•	SF	2nd	SF	~~Q~~	SF	QF	GS	22+1
Nicaragua	GS	GS	×	GS	GS	R2	×	×	R1	×	•/×	•/×	•/×	×	•	R1	×	•	•	•	•	•	•	GS	•	•	GS	~~Q~~	R16	•	•	10+1
Panama	GS	GS	×	×	×	×	×	×	×	R1	•/×	•/×	•/×	×	•	•/×	•	•	Top4	Top4	Top4	•	4th	QF	2nd	R2	SF	~~Q~~	QF	SF	QF	14+1
Caribbean Football Union (CFU) members
Antigua and Barbuda	?			×	×	×	×	GS	×	×	GS	•/×	•/×	×	•	•/×	•	•	×	•	•	•	•	•	•	R1	GS	~~Q~~	GS	•	GS	6+1
Aruba											•/×	•/×	•/×	×	•	•	×	•	•	•	•	•	•	•	GS	×	GS	~~Q~~	GS	•	•	3+1
Barbados			×	×	×	R1	×	GS	×	R1	GS	•/×	GS	•	•	•/×	•	•	•	•	•	×	×	•	•	×	GS	~~Q~~	•	•	•	6+1
Bermuda			5th	×	QF	R1	R1	QF	R1	R1	GS	GS	GS	GS	×	•/×	•	×	×	•	•	•	•	•	•	R1	GS	•	•	•	•	13
Cayman Islands													•/×	•	•	•/×	•	•	•	×	•	•	×	×	•	•	GS	•	•	•	•	1
Cuba	×	×	2nd	3rd	2nd	×	×	QF	×	R1	4th	3rd	•/×	GS	×	•/×	×	•	FS	•	•	•	QF	4th	GS	•	GS	~~Q~~	R16	SF	GS	16+1
Netherlands Antilles	3rd	4th	×	GS	×	R1	R1	QF	R1	R1	•	GS	•/×	GS	•	R1	•	•	•	•	•	•	•									11
Curaçao																								GS	•	•	GS	•	R16	•	•	3 (14)
Dominica															×	•/×	•	•	•	•	•	•	×	•	•	•	GS	•	•	•	•	1
Dominican Republic		×	×	×	GS	R2	R1	GS	×	×	•/×	•/×	•/×	•	×	•	×	•	•	•	•	•	×	•	•	•	GS	~~Q~~	2nd	GS	•	7+1
Grenada							R1	GS	×	×	•	•/×	GS	×	•/×	•/×	•	•	•	•	•	•	•	•	•	×	GS	•	•	•	•	4
Guadeloupe	?													GS	×	•/×	×	×	×	×	×	×	GS	×	•	•	GS	~~Q~~	×	×	×	3+1
Guyana			?	×	×	×	×	×	×	R2	•/×	•/×	•/×	•	GS	•/×	•	×	•	•	•	•	•	•	×	×	GS	•	•	•	×	3
Haiti	GS	×	×	×	×	×	R2	×	×	R1	•/×	•/×	•/×	•	×	•/×	×	•	FS	•	FS	•	×	GS	GS	R1	GS	~~Q~~	R16	GS	QF	12+1
Jamaica		GS	3rd	×	GS	R1	×	GS	R1	×	GS	GS	•/×	GS	GS	R2	FS	Top4	•	FS	FS	GS	GS	QF	GS	•	GS	~~Q~~	QF	GS	QF	23+1
Martinique	?														GS	R1	×	×	×	×	×	×	×	×	•	×	GS	×	×	•	•	3
Puerto Rico		×	×	×	GS	R1	R1	GS	R1	R1	•/×	•/×	•/×	•	×	•/×	•	•	•	×	×	•	×	GS	×	•	GS	•	R16	•	•	9
Saint Kitts and Nevis														•	•	•/×	×	×	•	•	FS	•	•	•	•	R1	GS	~~Q~~	GS	•	•	4+1
Saint Lucia												•/×	•/×	•	•	•/×	×	×	•	•	•	×	×	×	•	•	GS	×	•	×	•	1
Saint Martin																				×	•	•	×	×	×	×	GS	•	•	•	•	1
Saint Vincent and the Grenadines											•/×	•/×	•/×	×	×	•/×	•	•	×	•	•	•	•	•	•	×	GS	•	•	•	•	1
Sint Maarten																								×	×	•	GS	×	•	×	•	1
Suriname	×	×	×	×	×	R1	×	GS	×	×	GS	•/×	GS	•	×	•/×	×	•	•	•	•	•	GS	•	•	×	GS	~~Q~~	GS	•	•	7+1
Trinidad and Tobago		×	×	×	3rd	R2	R2	GS	R1	R2	3rd	GS	2nd	GS	GS	R1	FS	FS	•	FS	•	4th	GS	•	GS	R1	GS	~~Q~~	R16	•	•	21+1
U.S. Virgin Islands												•/×	•/×	×	×	•/×	×	×	•	•	•	×	•	×	×	×	GS	•	•	×	•	1

== FIFA U-20 World Cup performances ==
Legend

- 1st – Champions
- 2nd – Runners-up
- 3rd – Third place
- 4th – Fourth place
- QF – Quarter-finals
- R2 – Round 2
- R1 – Round 1
- – Hosts
- Q – Qualified for upcoming tournament

Team	(Tunisia) 1977	(Japan) 1979	(Australia) 1981	(Mexico) 1983	(Soviet Union) 1985	(Chile) 1987	(Saudi Arabia) 1989	(Portugal) 1991	(Australia) 1993	(Qatar) 1995	(Malaysia) 1997	(Nigeria) 1999	(Argentina) 2001	(United Arab Emirates) 2003	(Netherlands) 2005	(Canada) 2007	(Egypt) 2009	(Colombia) 2011	(Turkey) 2013	(New Zealand) 2015	(South Korea) 2017	(Poland) 2019	(Argentina) 2023	(Chile) 2025	(Azerbaijan) (Uzbekistan) 2027	(Armenia) (Georgia (country)) 2029	Total
Canada		R1			R1	R1					R2		R1	QF	R1	R1									Q		9
Costa Rica							R1			R1	R1	R2	R2			R1	4th	R2			R2				Q		10
Cuba																			R1					R1			2
Dominican Republic																							R1				1
El Salvador																			R1								1
Guatemala																		R2					R1				2
Honduras	R1									R1		R1			R1		R1			R1	R1	R1	R1				9
Jamaica													R1														1
Mexico	2nd	R1	R1	R1	QF			QF	QF		R2	QF		R1		QF		3rd	R2	R2	R1	QF		R2	Q		18
Panama														R1	R1	R1		R1		R1		R2		R1			7
Trinidad and Tobago								R1									R1										2
United States			R1	R1		R1	4th		QF		R2	R2	R2	QF	R2	QF	R1		QF	QF	QF	QF	QF	R2	Q		19

== Player awards ==
Year	MVP	Top goalscorer(s)	Best goalkeeper	Fair Play Award	Source
2009		(Canada) Randy Edwini-Bonsu (Costa Rica) Josué Martínez (Honduras) Roger Rojas (3 goals each)			
2011		(Costa Rica) Joel Campbell (6 goals)			
2013	(Mexico) Antonio Briseño	(Panama) Amet Ramírez (4 goals)	(Mexico) Richard Sánchez	El Salvador	
2015	(Panama) Luís Pereira	(Mexico) Hirving Lozano (United States) Romain Gall (5 goals each)	(Panama) Jaime de Gracia	United States	
2017	(United States) Erik Palmer-Brown	(Mexico) Ronaldo Cisneros (6 goals)	(United States) Jonathan Klinsmann	Mexico	
~~2020~~	Cancelled due to COVID-19 pandemic				
2022	(United States) Paxten Aaronson	(United States) Paxten Aaronson (7 goals)	(United States) Chris Brady	Dominican Republic	
2024	(United States) Niko Tsakiris	(Canada) Santiago López (Guatemala) Olger Escobar (Honduras) Anfronit Tatum (Panama) Gustavo Herrera (Panama) Rafael Mosquera (United States) David Vazquez (3 goals each)	(Cuba) Yurdy Hodelin	United States	
2026	(Mexico) Hugo Camberos	(Mexico) Hugo Camberos (5 goals)	(Mexico) Cristo Navarrete	Mexico	

== Top goalscorers ==
As of 2026 tournament

Rank	Player	Year(s)	Goals
1	(Mexico) José Juan Macías	2018	10
2	(United States) Paxten Aaronson	2022	7
3	(El Salvador) José Alvarado	1994	6
3	(Costa Rica) Joel Campbell	2011	6
3	(Mexico) Ronaldo Cisneros	2017	6
3	(Honduras) Marco Aceituno	2022	6
3	(United States) Quinn Sullivan	2022	6
8	(Costa Rica) Jewison Bennet	1994	5
8	(Honduras) Orvin Cabrera	1994	5
8	(Jamaica) Steve Green	1994	5
8	(Canada) David Xausa	1994	5
8	(Mexico) Hirving Lozano	2015	5
8	(United States) Romain Gall	2015	5
8	(Guatemala) Arquímides Ordóñez	2022	5
8	(Haiti) Steevenson Jeudy	2022	5
8	(Mexico) Esteban Lozano	2022	5
8	(Mexico) Hugo Camberos	2026	5

== Title winning coaches ==
Year	Coach
2009	(Costa Rica) Rónald González
2011	(Mexico) Juan Carlos Chávez
2013	(Mexico) Sergio Almaguer
2015	(Mexico) Sergio Almaguer
2017	(United States) Tab Ramos
2018	(United States) Tab Ramos
2020	Cancelled
2022	(United States) Mikey Varas
2024	(Mexico) Eduardo Arce
2026	(Mexico) Alex Diego

== See also ==
- CONCACAF
- CONCACAF Under-17 Championship
- CONCACAF Women's U-20 Championship
- FIFA U-20 World Cup
