= 2018–19 SKNFA Premier League =

SKNFA Premier League
- Season: 2018–19
- Top goalscorer: (Saint Kitts and Nevis) Keithroy Freeman (16 goals)

The 2018–19 SKNFA Premier League, is the 39th season of the SKNFA Premier League, the top division of football in Saint Kitts, one of the two islands of Saint Kitts and Nevis. The regular season began on 22 September 2018. The 3,500-capacity Warner Park was the main venue for the league.

== Regular season ==
Pos	Team	Pld	W	D	L	GF	GA	GD	Pts	Qualification or relegation
1	Village Superstars (A)	27	19	6	2	56	17	+39	63	Advance to Super 6
2	Newtown United (A)	27	14	10	3	56	29	+27	52	Advance to Super 6
3	Garden Hotspurs (A)	27	14	5	8	48	33	+15	47	Advance to Super 6
4	St. Paul's United (A)	27	11	8	8	40	26	+14	41	Advance to Super 6
5	Cayon Rockets (A)	27	11	5	11	25	29	−4	38	Advance to Super 6
6	Saddlers United (A)	27	9	2	16	24	46	−22	29	Advance to Super 6
7	St. Peters Strikers	27	7	5	15	27	44	−17	26	
8	Mantab United	27	4	8	15	23	52	−29	20	
9	United Old Road Jets	27	5	4	18	28	57	−29	19	
10	Conaree	27	11	7	9	33	27	+6	16 (Note: Conaree deducted 24 points for incident round 23.)	

Source: Soccerway
(A) Advance to a further round

== Super 6 ==
SKNFA decided on 22 October 2019 to cancel the Super 6. No champions were declared for this season, and no teams were relegated (league to be expanded to 12 teams next season).

Pos	Team	Pld	W	D	L	GF	GA	GD	Pts	Qualification or relegation
1	Village Superstars	0	0	0	0	0	0	0	0	Advance to Championship final
2	Newtown United	0	0	0	0	0	0	0	0	Advance to Championship final
3	Garden Hotspurs	0	0	0	0	0	0	0	0	
4	St. Paul's United	0	0	0	0	0	0	0	0	
5	Cayon Rockets	0	0	0	0	0	0	0	0	
6	Saddlers United	0	0	0	0	0	0	0	0	

Source: Soccerway

== Super 6 stadiums ==
Team	Location	Stadium	Capacity
Cayon Rockets	Basseterre	Warner Park	3,500
Garden Hotspurs	Basseterre	The Garden	5,000
Newtown United	Basseterre	Newtown Football Stadium	1,000
Saddlers United	Basseterre	Newtown Football Stadium	1,000
St. Paul's United	Basseterre	Warner Park	3,500
Village Superstars	Basseterre	Warner Park	3,500

== Championship final ==
=== First leg ===
Super 6 1st place	v	Super 6 2nd place

=== Second leg ===
Super 6 2nd place	v	Super 6 1st place

=== Third leg ===
Note: If necessary.

Super 6 1st place	v	Super 6 2nd place

== Top scorers ==
Rank	Player	Club	Goals
1	(Saint Kitts and Nevis) Keithroy Freeman	St. Paul's Utd	16
2	(Saint Kitts and Nevis) Kimaree Rogers	Village Superstars	15
3	(Saint Kitts and Nevis) Orlando Mitchum	Newtown Utd	13
4	(Saint Kitts and Nevis) Sylvester	Mantab United	12
5	(Saint Kitts and Nevis) Geovannie Lake	Garden Hotspurs	11
6	(Saint Kitts and Nevis) Tiquanny Williams	United Old Jets	10
7	(Saint Kitts and Nevis) Kadeen Lewis	Conaree	9
7	(Saint Kitts and Nevis) Vinceroy Nelson	Cayon Rockets	9
7	(Saint Kitts and Nevis) Tijhuan Isaac	Newtown Utd	9
7	(Saint Kitts and Nevis) Tahir Hanley	Village Superstars	9
