= 2018–19 Saint Kitts and Nevis National Cup =

Tournament details
- Country: Saint Kitts and Nevis

This tournament started on 26 February 2019 with preliminary round.

== Preliminary round ==
Played on 26 and 28 February 2019

Home team	Away team	Result
United Old Road Jets	Newton Ground Ballers	3–0 Awarded
Security Forces United FC	Davis Construction Lodge Patriots FC	3–2
Mantab United	Rivers of Living Water	3–0
KFC Trinity/Challengers United FC	Caribbean Cable Bath United	3–0 Awarded
Hardtimes United	Molineux FC	6–0

== Round of 16 ==
Played on 19 and 21 March 2019

Home team	Away team	Result
St. Paul's United	Sandy Point FC	2–1
Conaree FC	Mantab United	1–0
Cayon Rockets	Security Forces United FC	3–0
Saddlers United	United Old Road Jets	4–2
Garden Hotspurs	KFC Trinity/Challengers United FC	2–1
Newtown United	Hardtimes United	3–0
Village Superstars	Trafalgar Southstars	2–0
Dieppe Bay Eagles FC	St. Peters Strikers	2–7

== Quarterfinals ==
Played on 29, 30 and 31 March 2019

Home team	Away team	Result
Cayon Rockets	St. Peters Strikers	2–2 (5–4 p)
Conaree FC	St. Paul's United	2–2 (6–5 p)
Village Superstars	Saddlers United	4–1
Newtown United	Garden Hotspurs	4–0

== Top goalscorers ==
In bold, players that continue active in the competition.

Rank	Player	Club	Goals
1	(Saint Kitts and Nevis) Niquan Phipps	Saddlers United	3
2	(Saint Kitts and Nevis) Dionis Stephens	St. Peters Strikers	3
3	(Saint Kitts and Nevis) Denroy Matthew	Saddlers United	2
4	(Saint Kitts and Nevis) Orlando Mitchum	Newtown United	2
5	(Saint Kitts and Nevis) Chevaun Walwyn	Hardtimes United	2
6	(Saint Kitts and Nevis) Vinceroy Nelson	Cayon Rockets	2
7	(Saint Kitts and Nevis) Sylvester Alexander	Mantab United	2
8	(Saint Kitts and Nevis) Kareem Harris	St. Peters Strikers	2
9	(Saint Kitts and Nevis) Joseph Wilkes	Village Superstars	2
10	(Saint Kitts and Nevis) Errol O'Loughlin	Conaree FC	2
