= 2014–15 SKNFA Super League =

Statistics from the 2014–15 season.

== Table ==
=== Regular phase ===
Pos	Team	Pld	W	D	L	GF	GA	GD	Pts	Qualification or relegation
1	St. Paul's United (C)	27	15	6	6	62	22	+40	51	CFU Competition Playoffs
2	Conaree	27	14	7	6	59	33	+26	49	CFU Competition Playoffs
3	St. Peters Strikers	27	12	9	6	59	27	+32	45	CFU Competition Playoffs
4	Village Superstars	27	12	9	6	44	31	+13	45	CFU Competition Playoffs
5	Newtown United	27	12	8	7	55	33	+22	44	
6	Garden Hotspurs	27	12	6	9	36	37	−1	42	
7	Cayon	27	11	7	9	61	33	+28	40	
8	SPD United	27	9	5	13	40	55	−15	32	
9	Mantab	27	5	2	20	28	77	−49	17	Qualification to Relegation playoffs
10	St. Thomas Strikers (R)	27	3	1	23	14	110	−96	10	Relegation to 2015–16 Saint Kitts and Nevis Division 1

Source: RSSSF
Rules for classification: 1) points; 2) goal difference; 3) number of goals scored.
(C) Champions; (R) Relegated

=== Final four ===
Pos	Team	Pld	W	D	L	GF	GA	GD	Pts	Qualification
1	St. Paul's United (C)	3	2	1	0	5	3	+2	7	2016 CFU Club Championship
2	Conaree	3	2	0	1	5	4	+1	6	2016 CFU Club Championship
3	Village Superstars	3	1	1	1	5	4	+1	4	
4	St. Peters Strikers	3	0	0	3	1	5	−4	0	

Source: RSSSF
Rules for classification: 1) points; 2) goal difference; 3) number of goals scored.
(C) Champions
