= 2017–18 SKNFA Premier League =

Saint Kitts Premier League
- Season: 2017–18
- Champions: Village Superstars
- Caribbean Club Shield: Village Superstars
- Top goalscorer: (Saint Kitts and Nevis) Carlos Bertie (23 goals)

The 2017–18 Saint Kitts Premier League is the 38th season of the SKNFA Premier League, the top division of football in Saint Kitts, one of the two islands of Saint Kitts and Nevis. The regular season began on 1 October 2017, and the final was played in June 2018. Many league games took place in front of dozens of spectators.

== Regular season ==
| Pos | Team | Pld | W | D | L | GF | GA | GD | Pts | Qualification or relegation |
|---|---|---|---|---|---|---|---|---|---|---|
| 1 | Village Superstars FC | 27 | 18 | 5 | 4 | 70 | 20 | +50 | 59 | Qualification to play-offs |
| 2 | Cayon Rockets | 27 | 15 | 6 | 6 | 52 | 24 | +28 | 51 | Qualification to play-offs |
| 3 | Conaree FC | 27 | 15 | 5 | 7 | 57 | 26 | +31 | 50 | Qualification to play-offs |
| 4 | St. Paul's United FC | 27 | 13 | 11 | 3 | 43 | 25 | +18 | 50 | Qualification to play-offs |
| 5 | Garden Hotspurs FC | 27 | 15 | 5 | 7 | 50 | 33 | +17 | 50 | |
| 6 | St. Peters Strikers FC | 27 | 11 | 3 | 13 | 35 | 44 | −9 | 36 | |
| 7 | Newtown United FC | 27 | 9 | 6 | 12 | 31 | 35 | −4 | 33 | |
| 8 | St Thomas/Trinity Strikers FC | 27 | 6 | 2 | 19 | 23 | 54 | −31 | 20 | |
| 9 | Saddlers United FC | 27 | 5 | 4 | 18 | 15 | 41 | −26 | 19 | Relegation to lower division |
| 10 | Dieppe Bay Eagles FC | 27 | 4 | 1 | 22 | 15 | 89 | −74 | 13 | Relegation to lower division |

Updated to match(es) played on unknown. Source:

== Final four ==
| Pos | Team | Pld | W | D | L | GF | GA | GD | Pts | Qualification or relegation |
|---|---|---|---|---|---|---|---|---|---|---|
| 1 | Village Superstars FC | 3 | 3 | 0 | 0 | 7 | 1 | +6 | 9 | Qualification to play-offs |
| 2 | Conaree FC | 3 | 1 | 1 | 1 | 4 | 4 | 0 | 4 | Qualification to play-offs |
| 3 | St. Paul's United FC | 3 | 1 | 0 | 2 | 2 | 6 | −4 | 3 | |
| 4 | Cayon Rockets | 3 | 0 | 1 | 2 | 1 | 3 | −2 | 1 | |

Updated to match(es) played on unknown. Source:

== Championship final ==
| Date | Team 1 | Score | Team 2 |
First Leg
| Jun 17, Warner Park | Village Superstars | 0-0 (a.e.t.) [5-3 pen] | Conaree |
Second Leg
| Jun 20, Warner Park | Conaree | 1-3 | Village Superstars |
Third Leg
| Jun 23, if necessary | Village Superstars | n/p | Conaree |

== Top scorers ==
| Rank | Player | Club | Goal |
|---|---|---|---|
| 1 | (Saint Kitts and Nevis) Carlos Bertie | Cayon Rockets | 23 |
| 2 | (Saint Kitts and Nevis) Kimaree Rogers | Village Superstars | 19 |
| 3 | (Saint Kitts and Nevis) Travis Somersall | Village Superstars | 18 |
| 4 | (Saint Kitts and Nevis) Glenroy Samuel | Conaree | 14 |
| 5 | (Saint Kitts and Nevis) Keithroy Freeman | St. Paul's Utd | 13 |
| 6 | (Saint Kitts and Nevis) Tahir Hanley | Village Superstars | 11 |
| 6 | (Saint Kitts and Nevis) Orlando Mitchum | Conaree | 11 |
| 8 | (Saint Kitts and Nevis) Tiran Hanley | St. Paul's Utd | 10 |
| 8 | (Saint Kitts and Nevis) Akimba Lawrence | Newtown Utd | 10 |
| 10 | (Saint Kitts and Nevis) Alex Charles | Cayon Rockets | 9 |

== See also ==
- 2017–18 N1 League
