= 2015–16 SKNFA Super League =

SKNFA Super League
- Season: 2015–16
- Champions: Cayon Rockets
- Relegated: Bath United; Rivers of Living Water
- 2017 CFU Club Championship: Cayon Rockets; Conaree
- Biggest home win: Conaree 12-1 CCC Bath United; 8 May 2016
- Biggest away win: Rivers of Living Water 0-8 St. Peters; 30 January 2016
- Highest scoring: 13 goals: Conaree 12-1 CCC Bath United; 8 May 2016
- All statistics correct as of 17 May 2016.

The 2015–16 Saint Kitts Premier Division or alternatively known as the SKNFA Digicel Super League for sponsorship reasons, is the 36th season of the Saint Kitts Premier Division. The regular season began on 10 October 2015 and concluded on 15 May 2016. The Final Four playoffs began on 21 May 2016, with the final series ending on 17 June 2016. Cayon Rockets won the title, earning their first SKNFA Super League title since 2003.

== Clubs ==
- Bath United
- Cayon Rockets
- Conaree (Basseterre)
- Garden Hotspurs (Basseterre)
- Newtown United (Basseterre)
- Rivers of Living Water
- SPD United
- St. Paul's United (St. Paul's)
- St. Peters Strikers (St. Peters)
- Village Superstars (Champsville)

== Table ==
Pos	Team	Pld	W	D	L	GF	GA	GD	Pts	Qualification or relegation
1	Newtown United (Q)	27	18	4	5	68	20	+48	58	Qualification to the Playoffs
2	Conaree (Q)	27	15	9	3	69	28	+41	54	Qualification to the Playoffs
3	St. Paul's United (Q)	27	14	7	6	60	27	+33	49	Qualification to the Playoffs
4	Cayon Rockets (Q)	27	14	7	6	49	28	+21	49	Qualification to the Playoffs
5	Garden Hotspurs	27	14	7	6	41	23	+18	49	
6	Village Superstars	27	12	4	11	67	43	+24	40	
7	St. Peters Strikers	27	10	7	10	47	35	+12	37	
8	SPD United	27	6	9	12	29	49	−20	27	
9	Bath United (R)	27	2	1	24	22	95	−73	7	Relegation to SKNFA Division 1
10	Rivers of Living Water (R)	27	2	1	24	27	131	−104	7	Relegation to SKNFA Division 1

Updated to match(es) played on 20 May 2016.
Source: https://www.rsssf.org/tabless/stkitts2016.html
(Q) Qualified for the phase indicated;
(R) Relegated

== Playoffs ==
=== Final four ===
Pos	Team	Pld	W	D	L	GF	GA	GD	Pts	Qualification or relegation
1	Conaree (Q)	3	2	1	0	5	3	+2	7	Qualification to the Final
2	Cayon Rockets (Q)	3	1	1	1	3	2	+1	4	Qualification to the Final
3	St. Paul's United	3	1	1	1	3	3	0	4	
4	Newtown United	3	0	1	2	0	3	−3	1	

Updated to match(es) played on 15 June 2016.
Source: https://www.rsssf.org/tabless/stkitts2016.html
(Q) Qualified for the phase indicated

=== Championship final ===
Best of three series

10 June 2016
20:00

Cayon Rockets	0–2	Conaree
	Report	O'Loughlin 45+2' (pen.); Charles 78'

Warner Park, Basseterre
14 June 2016
20:00

Conaree	0–1	Cayon Rockets
Lewis (yellow card) 10'; Matthew (yellow card) 23'; Howe (yellow card) 68'	Report	Blanchette 26'; Hendrickson (yellow card) 56'; Thom (yellow card) 81'

Warner Park, Basseterre
17 June 2016
20:00

Conaree	1–3	Cayon Rockets
Charles (yellow card); Francis (yellow card); Martin (yellow card); Samuel (yellow card); Matthew	Report	Benjamin (yellow card); Isaac (yellow card); Morton (yellow card); Mitchum; Ker. Benjamin (yellow card); Nelson

Warner Park, Basseterre

Cayon wins the series 2–1
