= 2010–11 SKNFA Super League =

Saint Kitts and Nevis Premier Division
- Season: 2010–11
- Champions: Village Superstars (6th title)
- Relegated: KFC Challengers United FC
- Matches: 117
- Goals: 355 (3.03 per match)
- Biggest home win: Newtown 9-0 Challengers
- Biggest away win: Challengers 0-5 Superstars; Challengers 0-5 St. Peter's
- Highest scoring: Newtown 9-0 Challengers

The 2010–11 Saint Kitts and Nevis Premier Division was the 31st season of top-tier football in Saint Kitts and Nevis. The season began on 29 October 2010 and ended in June 2011. Newtown United FC were the defending champions, having won their 15th league championship last season.

This season's competition was held with nine clubs competing, one less than last season. The season will use a triple round robin format instead of a double round robin format for the first stage of the season. At the end of the first stage of the competition, the club in ninth place was relegated to the First Division while the clubs finishing in the top four progressed to the second stage of the competition, called the Final Four. In this stage, each club played against the other three once each. At the end, the top two clubs faced each other for the league championship in a three-legged playoff.

== Changes from 2009–10 ==
- The top four teams at the end of the first eight matches would earn a berth into the 2010 Super Mas Cup
- The top four teams by their second half record would earn a berth into the 2011 Easter Cup

== Teams ==
Clarence Fitzroy Bryant College and Washington Archibald High School FC finished in ninth and tenth place at the end of last season's competition and did not take part in this season's competition. Joining the competition this season were St. Thomas/Trinity Strikers FC.

Team	Home city	Home ground
Conaree United FC		
Garden Hotspurs FC	Basseterre	The Garden
KFC Challengers United FC		
Mantab FC		
Newtown United FC	Basseterre	Newtown Football Stadium
St Paul's United	St. Paul	Warner Park Sporting Complex
St. Peter's FC		
St. Thomas Strikers		
Village Superstars	Basseterre	

== First stage ==
=== Standings ===
Pos	Team	Pld	W	D	L	GF	GA	GD	Pts	Qualification or relegation
1	St. Paul's United	24	16	4	4	43	20	+23	52	Final Four
2	Newtown United	24	14	7	3	55	20	+35	49	Final Four
3	Conaree United	24	11	8	5	46	26	+20	41	Final Four
4	Village Superstars	24	10	7	7	42	26	+16	37	Final Four
5	St. Peter's	24	10	3	11	36	34	+2	33	
6	St. Thomas Strikers	24	9	6	9	28	38	−10	33	
7	Garden Hotspurs	24	8	6	10	44	35	+9	30	
8	Mantab	24	5	4	15	22	46	−24	19	
9	KFC Challengers United (R)	24	1	3	20	16	87	−71	6	Relegation to 2011–12 Saint Kitts and Nevis Division 1

Source: Soccerway
Rules for classification: 1) points; 2) goal difference; 3) number of goals scored.
(R) Relegated

=== Results ===
==== Matches 1–16 ====
Home \ Away	CON	GAR	KFC	MAN	NTU	SPU	STP	STS	VIL
Conaree United		3–1	4–0	0–0	0–0	2–3	3–1	0–0	1–1
Garden Hotspurs	0–0		1–1	3–1	2–3	1–1	0–2	4–0	2–1
KFC Challengers United	1–5	1–5		1–2	2–5	0–3	2–3	1–2	0–5
Mantab	2–4	0–3	1–3		1–2	2–1	2–1	2–3	0–3
Newtown United	1–2	2–3	5–0	3–0		0–0	2–2	4–2	4–0
St. Paul's United	2–1	2–1	2–0	2–0	1–0		2–0	2–0	0–0
St. Peter's	3–2	1–0	1–1	1–0	0–0	2–4		0–1	0–1
St. Thomas Strikers	1–5	2–1	2–0	0–0	1–1	0–3	5–2		2–2
Village Superstars	0–1	2–0	3–3	0–1	0–1	2–2	2–1	2–0	

Source: Soccerway
Legend: Blue = home team win; Yellow = draw; Red = away team win.

==== Matches 17–24 ====
Home \ Away	CON	GAR	KFC	MAN	NTU	SPU	STP	STS	VIL
Conaree United		2–2		3–1			0–1	1–1	2–1
Garden Hotspurs			8–0	2–2	0–3	1–2	1–3		
KFC Challengers United	0–2					0–3	0–5		
Mantab			3–0 (Note: This match was awarded to Mantab.)						
Newtown United	2–2		9–0	3–0			2–1	1–0	
St. Paul's United	2–1			2–1	0–1		1–0	1–2	
St. Peter's				2–0				4–1	0–2
St. Thomas Strikers		0–2	2–0	0–0					1–0
Village Superstars		1–1	6–0	4–1	1–1	3–2			

Source: Soccerway
Legend: Blue = home team win; Yellow = draw; Red = away team win.

== Final four ==
Pos	Team	Pld	W	D	L	GF	GA	GD	Pts	VIL	SPU	CON	NTU
1	Village Superstars	3	2	1	0	6	4	+2	7			3–2	
2	St. Paul's United	3	2	1	0	3	1	+2	7	1–1			1–0
3	Conaree United	3	0	1	2	3	5	−2	1		0–1		
4	Newtown United	3	0	1	2	2	4	−2	1	1–2		1–1	

Source: Soccerway
Legend: Blue = home team win; Yellow = draw; Red = away team win.
Rules for classification: 1) points; 2) goal difference; 3) number of goals scored.

== Championship playoff ==
The top two teams at the end of the Final Four will play a best-of-three game series to crown a season champion. The matches took place on 15, 18 and 22 June 2011.

Team 1	Pts	Team 2	1st leg	2nd leg	3rd leg
St Paul's United	3–6	Village Superstars	1–2	2–1	0–3

== Other competitions ==
=== 2010 Super Mas Cup ===
This competition involved the top four teams in the first third of the regular season. The competition took place on 18 and 19 December 2010 at the Newtown Football Stadium.

==== Semifinals ====
Team 1	Score	Team 2
Newtown United FC	0–1	Conaree United FC
St Paul's United	2–2 (p.) 3–0	St. Peter's FC

==== Third place match ====
Team 1	Score	Team 2
Newtown United FC	5–1	St. Peter's FC

==== Final ====
Team 1	Score	Team 2
Conaree United FC	0–0 (a.e.t.) (p.) 9–8	St Paul's United

=== 2011 Easter Cup ===
This competition involved the top four teams in the second third of the regular season. The competition took place on 23 and 24 April 2011 at the Warner Park Sporting Complex.

==== Semifinals ====
Team 1	Score	Team 2
St Paul's United	1–1 (a.e.t.) (p.) 1–3	Newtown United FC
Village Superstars	2–0	Conaree United FC

==== Third place match ====
Team 1	Score	Team 2
Newtown United FC	2–0	Conaree United FC

==== Final ====
Team 1	Score	Team 2
Village Superstars	3–0	St Paul's United
