= 2023 CONCACAF Gold Cup squads =

International football tournament

The 2023 CONCACAF Gold Cup was an international football tournament that was held in the United States and Canada from 24 June to 16 July 2023. The sixteen participating national teams were required to register a squad of up to 23 players, of which three had to be goalkeepers. Only players in these squads were eligible to take part in the tournament.

Each national team had to submit a provisional list of up to sixty players (including at least five goalkeepers) to CONCACAF no later than thirty days prior to the start of the opening match of the tournament. The final list of up to 23 players per national team had to be submitted to CONCACAF by 14 June 2023, ten days before the opening match of the tournament. All players in the final list had to be chosen from the respective provisional list. In the event that a player on the submitted final list suffered a serious injury or presents medical reasons, he could be replaced until 24 hours before the kick-off of his team's first match of the tournament, provided that it was approved by the CONCACAF Medical Committee. After the end of the group stage, national teams that qualified for the knockout stage could also replace players in case of serious injury, confirmed by the CONCACAF Medical Committee, until 24 hours before the kick-off of their quarter-final match. In any case, the replacement player had to come from the provisional list and would be assigned the shirt number of the replaced player.

The twelve national teams that participated in the qualifying stage were also required to submit their provisional and final lists within the deadlines indicated above. The three teams that advanced to the group stage had to keep their same final roster. CONCACAF released the final lists of the teams in the qualifying stage on 15 June 2023.

CONCACAF published the provisional lists on 1 June 2023. The final lists were released on 19 June 2023.

The age listed for each player is on 24 June 2023, the first day of the tournament. The numbers of caps and goals listed for each player do not include any matches played after the start of the tournament. The club listed is the club for which the player last played a competitive match before the tournament. (Note: This is the club a player was last able to play for during the previous season in the event a player did not play a competitive match.) The nationality for each club reflects the national association (not the league) to which the club is affiliated. A flag is included for coaches who are of a different nationality than their own national team.

== Group A ==
=== United States ===
The United States' 60-man provisional list was announced by CONCACAF on 1 June 2023. The final squad was announced on 6 June 2023.

After the group stage, midfielder Alan Soñora was replaced by Jackson Yueill due to an injury.

Head coach: B. J. Callaghan

No.	Pos.	Player	Date of birth (age)	Caps	Goals	Club
1	GK	Matt Turner	24 June 1994 (aged 29)	28	0	(The Football Association) Arsenal
2	DF	DeAndre Yedlin	9 July 1993 (aged 29)	78	0	(United States Soccer Federation) Inter Miami CF
3	DF	Aaron Long	12 October 1992 (aged 30)	32	3	(United States Soccer Federation) Los Angeles FC
4	DF	Matt Miazga	19 July 1995 (aged 27)	23	1	(United States Soccer Federation) FC Cincinnati
5	DF	Bryan Reynolds	28 June 2001 (aged 21)	3	0	(Royal Belgian Football Association) Westerlo
6	MF	Gianluca Busio	28 May 2002 (aged 21)	9	0	(Italian Football Federation) Venezia
8	MF	James Sands	6 July 2000 (aged 22)	8	0	(United States Soccer Federation) New York City FC
9	FW	Jesús Ferreira	24 December 2000 (aged 22)	18	8	(United States Soccer Federation) FC Dallas
10	MF	Cristian Roldan	3 June 1995 (aged 28)	32	0	(United States Soccer Federation) Seattle Sounders FC
11	FW	Cade Cowell	14 October 2003 (aged 19)	3	0	(United States Soccer Federation) San Jose Earthquakes
12	DF	Miles Robinson	14 March 1997 (aged 26)	23	3	(United States Soccer Federation) Atlanta United FC
13	FW	Jordan Morris	26 October 1994 (aged 28)	52	11	(United States Soccer Federation) Seattle Sounders FC
14	MF	Djordje Mihailovic	10 November 1998 (aged 24)	6	1	(Royal Dutch Football Association) AZ
15	DF	DeJuan Jones	24 June 1997 (aged 26)	2	0	(United States Soccer Federation) New England Revolution
16	MF	Aidan Morris	16 November 2001 (aged 21)	2	0	(United States Soccer Federation) Columbus Crew
17	FW	Alejandro Zendejas	7 February 1998 (aged 25)	3	1	(Mexican Football Federation) América
18	GK	Sean Johnson	31 May 1989 (aged 34)	12	0	(Canadian Soccer Association) Toronto FC
19	FW	Brandon Vázquez	14 October 1998 (aged 24)	3	1	(United States Soccer Federation) FC Cincinnati
20	DF	Jalen Neal	24 August 2003 (aged 19)	2	0	(United States Soccer Federation) LA Galaxy
21	DF	John Tolkin	31 July 2002 (aged 20)	1	0	(United States Soccer Federation) New York Red Bulls
22	FW	Julian Gressel	16 December 1993 (aged 29)	2	0	(Canadian Soccer Association) Vancouver Whitecaps FC
23	GK	Gabriel Slonina	15 May 2004 (aged 19)	1	0	(The Football Association) Chelsea
24	MF	Jackson Yueill	19 March 1997 (aged 26)	16	0	(United States Soccer Federation) San José Earthquakes
The following player was replaced after the group stage:
7	MF	Alan Soñora (injured)	3 August 1998 (aged 24)	3	0	(Mexican Football Federation) Juárez

=== Jamaica ===
Jamaica's 50-man provisional list was announced by CONCACAF on 1 June 2023. The final squad was announced on 19 June 2023.

Head coach: (Iceland) Heimir Hallgrímsson

No.	Pos.	Player	Date of birth (age)	Caps	Goals	Club
1	GK	Andre Blake (captain)	21 November 1990 (aged 32)	64	0	(United States Soccer Federation) Philadelphia Union
2	DF	Dexter Lembikisa	4 November 2003 (aged 19)	3	0	(The Football Association) Wolverhampton Wanderers
3	MF	Kevon Lambert	22 March 1997 (aged 26)	19	0	(United States Soccer Federation) Phoenix Rising
4	DF	Amari'i Bell	5 May 1994 (aged 29)	9	0	(The Football Association) Luton Town
5	DF	Ethan Pinnock	29 May 1993 (aged 30)	6	0	(The Football Association) Brentford
6	DF	Di'Shon Bernard	14 October 2000 (aged 22)	0	0	(The Football Association) Portsmouth
7	FW	Leon Bailey	9 August 1997 (aged 25)	19	3	(The Football Association) Aston Villa
8	MF	Daniel Johnson	8 October 1992 (aged 30)	11	2	(The Football Association) Preston North End
9	FW	Cory Burke	28 December 1991 (aged 31)	28	7	(United States Soccer Federation) New York Red Bulls
10	MF	Bobby De Cordova-Reid	2 February 1993 (aged 30)	18	3	(The Football Association) Fulham
11	FW	Shamar Nicholson	16 February 1997 (aged 26)	33	10	(Russian Football Union) Spartak Moscow
12	FW	Demarai Gray	28 June 1996 (aged 26)	0	0	(The Football Association) Everton
13	GK	Coniah Boyce-Clarke	1 March 2003 (aged 20)	0	0	(The Football Association) Reading
14	FW	Dujuan Richards	11 October 2005 (aged 17)	2	0	(Jamaica Football Federation) Phoenix All Stars
15	MF	Joel Latibeaudiere	6 January 2000 (aged 23)	1	0	(Football Association of Wales) Swansea City
16	MF	Kaheem Parris	6 January 2000 (aged 23)	7	0	(Ukrainian Association of Football) Dynamo Kyiv
17	DF	Damion Lowe	5 May 1993 (aged 30)	52	2	(United States Soccer Federation) Philadelphia Union
18	FW	Michail Antonio	28 March 1990 (aged 33)	6	3	(The Football Association) West Ham United
19	DF	Adrian Mariappa	3 October 1986 (aged 36)	68	1	(The Football Association) Salford City
20	DF	Kemar Lawrence	17 September 1992 (aged 30)	75	3	(United States Soccer Federation) Minnesota United FC
21	DF	Javain Brown	9 March 1999 (aged 24)	20	0	(Canadian Soccer Association) Vancouver Whitecaps FC
22	MF	Jon Russell	9 October 2000 (aged 22)	1	0	(The Football Association) Barnsley
23	GK	Jahmali Waite	24 December 1998 (aged 24)	3	0	(United States Soccer Federation) Pittsburgh Riverhounds

=== Trinidad and Tobago ===
Trinidad and Tobago's 60-man provisional list was announced by CONCACAF on 1 June 2023. The final squad was announced on 15 June 2023. On 22 June 2023, midfielder Daniel Phillips was replaced by Luke Singh due to an injury.

Head coach: Angus Eve

No.	Pos.	Player	Date of birth (age)	Caps	Goals	Club
1	GK	Marvin Phillip	1 August 1984 (aged 38)	91	0	(Trinidad and Tobago Football Association) Port of Spain
2	DF	Aubrey David	11 October 1990 (aged 32)	72	1	(Ecuadorian Football Federation) Aucas
3	MF	Joevin Jones	3 August 1991 (aged 31)	87	12	(Trinidad and Tobago Football Association) Police
4	DF	Sheldon Bateau	29 January 1991 (aged 32)	50	4	(Royal Belgian Football Association) Beveren
5	DF	Leland Archer	8 January 1996 (aged 27)	3	0	(United States Soccer Federation) Charleston Battery
6	DF	Luke Singh	12 September 2000 (aged 22)	0	0	(Canadian Soccer Association) Atlético Ottawa
7	FW	Ryan Telfer	4 March 1994 (aged 29)	21	8	(United States Soccer Federation) Miami FC
8	MF	Ajani Fortune	30 December 2002 (aged 20)	4	0	(United States Soccer Federation) Atlanta United FC
9	FW	Kadeem Corbin	3 March 1996 (aged 27)	3	0	(Trinidad and Tobago Football Association) La Horquetta Rangers
10	MF	Kevin Molino	17 June 1990 (aged 33)	56	22	(United States Soccer Federation) Columbus Crew
11	FW	Levi García	20 November 1997 (aged 25)	38	8	(Hellenic Football Federation) AEK Athens
12	DF	Kareem Moses	11 February 1990 (aged 33)	16	1	(Football Association of Finland) FF Jaro
13	FW	Real Gill	23 January 2003 (aged 20)	1	0	(Trinidad and Tobago Football Association) Club Sando
14	DF	Shannon Gomez	5 October 1996 (aged 26)	8	0	(United States Soccer Federation) San Antonio FC
15	MF	Neveal Hackshaw	21 November 1995 (aged 27)	32	2	(United States Soccer Federation) Oakland Roots SC
16	DF	Alvin Jones	9 July 1994 (aged 28)	43	2	(Trinidad and Tobago Football Association) Club Sando
17	MF	Andre Rampersad	2 February 1995 (aged 28)	2	0	(Canadian Soccer Association) HFX Wanderers
18	DF	Triston Hodge	9 October 1994 (aged 28)	25	0	(United States Soccer Federation) Hartford Athletic
19	FW	Malcolm Shaw	27 July 1995 (aged 27)	0	0	(Canadian Soccer Association) Atlético Ottawa
20	FW	Kaïlé Auvray	27 May 2004 (aged 19)	6	0	(United States Soccer Federation) Sporting Kansas City II
21	GK	Nicklas Frenderup	14 December 1992 (aged 30)	10	0	(Norwegian Football Federation) Ranheim
22	GK	Denzil Smith	12 October 1999 (aged 23)	1	0	(Trinidad and Tobago Football Association) W Connection
23	MF	Molik Jesse Khan	8 April 2004 (aged 19)	4	0	(United States Soccer Federation) Minnesota United FC 2

=== Saint Kitts and Nevis ===
Saint Kitts and Nevis' 37-man provisional list was announced by CONCACAF on 1 June 2023, and was reduced to 34 players on 6 June 2023. The final squad of 21 players was announced on 15 June 2023, however, CONCACAF released a Saint Kitts and Nevis' final squad of 23 players. Defender Rico Browne was replaced by Lois Maynard.

Head coach: Austin Huggins

No.	Pos.	Player	Date of birth (age)	Caps	Goals	Club
1	GK	Jamal Jeffers	23 March 1993 (aged 30)	13	0	(St. Kitts and Nevis Football Association) St. Paul's United
2	DF	Malique Roberts	1 August 2001 (aged 21)	7	0	(St. Kitts and Nevis Football Association) Cayon Rockets
3	DF	Gerard Williams	4 June 1988 (aged 35)	79	2	(All India Football Federation) TRAU
4	DF	Andre Burley	10 September 1999 (aged 23)	11	0	(The Football Association) Oxford City
5	DF	Jameel Ible	26 November 1993 (aged 29)	5	0	(The Football Association) Guiseley
6	DF	Lois Maynard	22 January 1989 (aged 34)	12	0	(The Football Association) Oldham Athletic
7	FW	Tiquanny Williams	10 September 2001 (aged 21)	7	2	(St. Kitts and Nevis Football Association) Old Road Jets
8	MF	Yohannes Mitchum	6 April 1998 (aged 25)	28	1	(St. Kitts and Nevis Football Association) Newtown United
9	FW	Carlos Bertie	10 September 1995 (aged 27)	18	3	(St. Kitts and Nevis Football Association) Cayon Rockets
10	FW	Jacob Hazel	15 April 1994 (aged 29)	5	0	(The Football Association) Darlington
11	MF	Tyquan Terrell	16 April 1998 (aged 25)	10	2	(St. Kitts and Nevis Football Association) St. Peter's
12	DF	Dihjorn Simmonds	2 November 1998 (aged 24)	1	0	(St. Kitts and Nevis Football Association) Cayon Rockets
13	DF	Ezrick Nicholls	13 September 1999 (aged 23)	1	0	(United States Soccer Federation) University of Tampa
14	MF	Raheem Somersall	5 July 1997 (aged 25)	17	0	(United States Soccer Federation) North Carolina FC
15	MF	Mervin Lewis	26 August 2000 (aged 22)	4	0	(St. Kitts and Nevis Football Association) Cayon Rockets
16	FW	Keithroy Freeman	16 October 1993 (aged 29)	13	6	(St. Kitts and Nevis Football Association) St. Paul's United
17	FW	Rowan Liburd	28 August 1992 (aged 30)	13	4	(The Football Association) Ramsgate
18	GK	Julani Archibald (captain)	18 May 1991 (aged 32)	51	0	(Royal Spanish Football Federation) Lorca Deportiva
19	MF	Romaine Sawyers	2 November 1991 (aged 31)	35	6	(Football Association of Wales) Cardiff City
20	DF	Raheem Hanley	24 February 1994 (aged 29)	10	0	(The Football Association) Stalybridge Celtic
21	FW	Omari Sterling-James	15 September 1993 (aged 29)	19	4	(The Football Association) Ebbsfleet United
22	MF	Ronaldo Belgrove	15 September 1998 (aged 24)	0	0	(United States Soccer Federation) Miami City
23	GK	Xander Parke	17 November 2003 (aged 19)	0	0	(The Football Association) Shrewsbury Town

== Group B ==
=== Mexico ===
Mexico's 40-man provisional list was announced by CONCACAF on 1 June 2023. The final squad was announced on 31 May 2023. Carlos Acevedo withdrew due to injury and was replaced by José Antonio Rodríguez. Alexis Vega and Sebastián Córdova also withdrew due to injury and replaced by Roberto Alvarado and Diego Lainez respectively.

Head coach: Jaime Lozano

No.	Pos.	Player	Date of birth (age)	Caps	Goals	Club
1	GK	José Antonio Rodríguez	4 July 1992 (aged 30)	1	0	(Mexican Football Federation) Tijuana
2	DF	Julián Araujo	13 August 2001 (aged 21)	7	0	(Royal Spanish Football Federation) Barcelona B
3	DF	César Montes	24 February 1997 (aged 26)	35	1	(Royal Spanish Football Federation) Espanyol
4	MF	Edson Álvarez	24 October 1997 (aged 25)	62	3	(Royal Dutch Football Association) Ajax
5	DF	Johan Vásquez	22 October 1998 (aged 24)	9	1	(Italian Football Federation) Cremonese
6	DF	Gerardo Arteaga	7 September 1998 (aged 24)	19	1	(Royal Belgian Football Association) Genk
7	MF	Luis Romo	5 June 1995 (aged 28)	30	1	(Mexican Football Federation) Monterrey
8	MF	Carlos Rodríguez	3 January 1997 (aged 26)	43	0	(Mexican Football Federation) Cruz Azul
9	FW	Ozziel Herrera	25 May 2001 (aged 22)	5	0	(Mexican Football Federation) Atlas
10	FW	Roberto Alvarado	7 September 1998 (aged 24)	35	4	(Mexican Football Federation) Guadalajara
11	FW	Santiago Giménez	18 April 2001 (aged 22)	12	2	(Royal Dutch Football Association) Feyenoord
12	GK	Luis Malagón	2 March 1997 (aged 26)	2	0	(Mexican Football Federation) América
13	GK	Guillermo Ochoa (captain)	13 July 1985 (aged 37)	137	0	(Italian Football Federation) Salernitana
14	FW	Érick Sánchez	27 September 1999 (aged 23)	13	1	(Mexican Football Federation) Pachuca
15	FW	Uriel Antuna	21 August 1997 (aged 25)	45	10	(Mexican Football Federation) Cruz Azul
16	MF	Diego Lainez	9 June 2000 (aged 23)	24	3	(Mexican Football Federation) UANL
17	MF	Orbelín Pineda	24 March 1996 (aged 27)	54	7	(Hellenic Football Federation) AEK Athens
18	MF	Luis Chávez	15 January 1996 (aged 27)	18	1	(Mexican Football Federation) Pachuca
19	DF	Jorge Sánchez	10 December 1997 (aged 25)	31	1	(Royal Dutch Football Association) Ajax
20	FW	Henry Martín	18 November 1992 (aged 30)	33	7	(Mexican Football Federation) América
21	DF	Israel Reyes	23 May 2000 (aged 23)	9	2	(Mexican Football Federation) América
22	DF	Víctor Guzmán	7 March 2002 (aged 21)	3	0	(Mexican Football Federation) Monterrey
23	DF	Jesús Gallardo	15 August 1994 (aged 28)	86	2	(Mexican Football Federation) Monterrey

=== Haiti ===
Haiti announced a 35-man provisional list on 25 May 2023, which was later reduced to 28 players on 2 June 2023. The final squad was announced on 19 June 2023.

Head coach: (Spain) Gabriel Calderón

No.	Pos.	Player	Date of birth (age)	Caps	Goals	Club
1	GK	Alexandre Pierre	25 February 2001 (aged 22)	2	0	(French Football Federation) Strasbourg
2	DF	Carlens Arcus	28 June 1996 (aged 26)	30	1	(Royal Dutch Football Association) Vitesse
3	MF	Jeppe Simonsen	21 November 1995 (aged 27)	8	1	(Polish Football Association) Podbeskidzie
4	DF	Ricardo Adé (captain)	21 May 1990 (aged 33)	28	2	(Ecuadorian Football Federation) LDU Quito
5	DF	Djimy Alexis	8 October 1997 (aged 25)	6	1	(Israel Football Association) Hapoel Petah Tikva
6	DF	Garven Metusala	31 December 1999 (aged 23)	1	0	(Canadian Soccer Association) Forge FC
7	FW	Carnejy Antoine	27 July 1991 (aged 31)	13	10	(Israel Football Association) Hapoel Haifa
8	MF	Leverton Pierre	9 March 1998 (aged 25)	11	0	(French Football Federation) Dunkerque
9	FW	Duckens Nazon	7 April 1994 (aged 29)	50	26	(Bulgarian Football Union) CSKA Sofia
10	DF	Wilde-Donald Guerrier	31 March 1989 (aged 34)	58	11	(Association of Football Federations of Azerbaijan) Zira
11	FW	Derrick Etienne Jr.	25 November 1996 (aged 26)	38	7	(United States Soccer Federation) Atlanta United FC
12	GK	Josué Duverger	27 April 2000 (aged 23)	5	0	(Portuguese Football Federation) Santarém
13	FW	Jayro Jean	22 June 1998 (aged 25)	0	0	(Bolivian Football Federation) Real Santa Cruz
14	FW	Fafà Picault	23 February 1991 (aged 32)	0	0	(United States Soccer Federation) Nashville SC
15	DF	Steven Séance	20 February 1992 (aged 31)	3	1	(French Football Federation) Sedan
16	FW	Mondy Prunier	22 December 1999 (aged 23)	2	3	(French Football Federation) Versailles
17	MF	Danley Jean Jacques	20 May 2000 (aged 23)	0	0	(French Football Federation) Metz
18	MF	Carl Fred Sainté	9 August 2002 (aged 20)	5	0	(United States Soccer Federation) North Texas SC
19	MF	Steeven Saba	24 February 1993 (aged 30)	19	3	(Haitian Football Federation) Violette
20	FW	Frantzdy Pierrot	29 March 1995 (aged 28)	23	14	(Israel Football Association) Maccabi Haifa
21	MF	Bryan Alceus	1 February 1996 (aged 27)	31	0	(Cyprus Football Association) Olympiakos Nicosia
22	DF	Alex Junior Christian	12 May 1993 (aged 30)	42	1	(Georgian Football Federation) Telavi
23	GK	Garissone Innocent	16 April 2000 (aged 23)	0	0	(Royal Belgian Football Association) Eupen

=== Honduras ===
Honduras's 60-man provisional list was announced by CONCACAF on 1 June 2023, The final squad was announced on 19 June 2023.

Head coach: (Argentina) Diego Vásquez

No.	Pos.	Player	Date of birth (age)	Caps	Goals	Club
1	GK	Edrick Menjívar	1 March 1993 (aged 30)	6	0	(National Autonomous Federation of Football of Honduras) Olimpia
2	DF	Devron García	17 February 1996 (aged 27)	0	0	(National Autonomous Federation of Football of Honduras) Real España
3	DF	Wesly Decas	11 August 1999 (aged 23)	3	0	(National Autonomous Federation of Football of Honduras) Motagua
4	DF	Marcelo Santos	2 August 1992 (aged 30)	6	0	(National Autonomous Federation of Football of Honduras) Motagua
5	MF	Christian Altamirano	26 November 1989 (aged 33)	6	0	(National Autonomous Federation of Football of Honduras) Olancho
6	MF	Bryan Acosta	24 November 1993 (aged 29)	58	2	(United States Soccer Federation) Colorado Rapids
7	FW	Alberth Elis	12 February 1996 (aged 27)	57	12	(French Football Federation) Brest
8	MF	Joseph Rosales	6 November 2000 (aged 22)	7	0	(United States Soccer Federation) Minnesota United FC
9	FW	Rubilio Castillo	26 November 1991 (aged 31)	30	6	(Chinese Football Association) Nantong Zhiyun
10	MF	Alexander López	5 June 1992 (aged 31)	47	6	(Costa Rican Football Federation) Alajuelense
11	FW	Jerry Bengtson	8 April 1987 (aged 36)	65	22	(National Autonomous Federation of Football of Honduras) Olimpia
12	FW	Jorge Benguché	21 May 1996 (aged 27)	8	3	(National Autonomous Federation of Football of Honduras) Olimpia
13	DF	Maylor Núñez	5 July 1996 (aged 26)	5	0	(National Autonomous Federation of Football of Honduras) Olimpia
14	MF	Jorge Álvarez	28 January 1998 (aged 25)	10	1	(National Autonomous Federation of Football of Honduras) Olimpia
15	DF	Luis Vega	28 February 2002 (aged 21)	0	0	(National Autonomous Federation of Football of Honduras) Motagua
16	FW	Edwin Solano	25 January 1996 (aged 27)	15	2	(National Autonomous Federation of Football of Honduras) Olimpia
17	MF	José Pinto	27 September 1997 (aged 25)	4	1	(National Autonomous Federation of Football of Honduras) Olimpia
18	GK	Harold Fonseca	8 October 1993 (aged 29)	3	0	(National Autonomous Federation of Football of Honduras) Olancho
19	DF	Omar Elvir	28 November 1989 (aged 33)	10	0	(National Autonomous Federation of Football of Honduras) Olancho
20	MF	Deiby Flores	16 June 1996 (aged 27)	25	0	(Hungarian Football Federation) Fehérvár
21	MF	Alexy Vega	16 September 1996 (aged 26)	0	0	(National Autonomous Federation of Football of Honduras) Victoria
22	GK	Luis López	13 September 1993 (aged 29)	56	0	(National Autonomous Federation of Football of Honduras) Real España
23	DF	Franklin Flores	18 May 1996 (aged 27)	11	0	(National Autonomous Federation of Football of Honduras) Real España

=== Qatar ===
Qatar announced a provisional list of 41 players on 10 May 2023, however, the complete 60-man provisional list was announced by CONCACAF on 1 June 2023, and was reduced to 26 players on 16 May 2023. The final list was announced on 19 June 2023, with one change from the list released by CONCACAF one day before, forward Ahmed Alaaeldin (injured) was replaced by Mahdi Salem.

Head coach: (Portugal) Carlos Queiroz

No.	Pos.	Player	Date of birth (age)	Caps	Goals	Club
1	GK	Salah Zakaria	24 April 1999 (aged 24)	1	0	(Qatar Football Association) Al-Duhail
2	DF	Ahmed Suhail	8 February 1999 (aged 24)	1	0	(Qatar Football Association) Al-Arabi
3	DF	Hazem Shehata	2 February 1998 (aged 25)	2	0	(Qatar Football Association) Al-Wakrah
4	DF	Yousef Aymen	21 March 1999 (aged 24)	0	0	(Qatar Football Association) Al-Duhail
5	DF	Tarek Salman	5 December 1997 (aged 25)	63	0	(Qatar Football Association) Al-Sadd
6	MF	Ahmed Fatehi	25 January 1993 (aged 30)	11	0	(Qatar Football Association) Al-Arabi
7	MF	Mahdi Salem	4 April 2004 (aged 19)	0	0	(Qatar Football Association) Al-Sadd
8	MF	Ali Assadalla	19 January 1993 (aged 30)	64	12	(Qatar Football Association) Al-Sadd
9	FW	Mohammed Muntari	20 December 1993 (aged 29)	51	14	(Qatar Football Association) Al-Duhail
10	MF	Mohammed Waad	18 September 1999 (aged 23)	27	0	(Qatar Football Association) Al-Sadd
11	FW	Yusuf Abdurisag	6 August 1999 (aged 23)	17	1	(Qatar Football Association) Al-Wakrah
12	MF	Abdullah Marafee	13 April 1992 (aged 31)	0	0	(Qatar Football Association) Al-Arabi
13	DF	Musab Kheder	26 September 1993 (aged 29)	31	0	(Qatar Football Association) Al-Sadd
14	DF	Homam Ahmed	25 August 1999 (aged 23)	36	2	(Qatar Football Association) Al-Gharafa
15	DF	Bassam Al-Rawi	16 December 1997 (aged 25)	59	2	(Qatar Football Association) Al-Duhail
16	MF	Mostafa Meshaal	28 March 2001 (aged 22)	3	0	(Qatar Football Association) Al-Shamal
17	FW	Tameem Al-Abdullah	5 October 2002 (aged 20)	4	1	(Qatar Football Association) Al-Rayyan
18	FW	Khalid Muneer	24 February 1998 (aged 25)	7	1	(Qatar Football Association) Al-Wakrah
19	FW	Almoez Ali	19 August 1996 (aged 26)	88	42	(Qatar Football Association) Al-Duhail
20	DF	Jassem Gaber	20 February 2002 (aged 21)	4	0	(Qatar Football Association) Al-Arabi
21	GK	Yousef Hassan	24 May 1996 (aged 27)	7	0	(Qatar Football Association) Al-Gharafa
22	GK	Meshaal Barsham	14 February 1998 (aged 25)	26	0	(Qatar Football Association) Al-Sadd
23	MF	Assim Madibo	22 October 1996 (aged 26)	49	0	(Qatar Football Association) Al-Duhail

== Group C ==
=== Costa Rica ===
Costa Rica's 60-man provisional list was announced by CONCACAF on 1 June 2023, and was reduced to 24 players on 2 June 2023. The final squad was also announced by CONCACAF on 19 June 2023.

After the group stage, midfielders Carlos Mora and Roan Wilson were replaced by Yeltsin Tejeda and Kenneth Vargas due to injuries.

Head coach: (Colombia) Luis Fernando Suárez

No.	Pos.	Player	Date of birth (age)	Caps	Goals	Club
1	GK	Jussef Delgado	27 January 1994 (aged 29)	0	0	(Costa Rican Football Federation) Pérez Zeledón
2	DF	Carlos Martínez	30 March 1999 (aged 24)	8	0	(Costa Rican Football Federation) Alajuelense
3	DF	Juan Pablo Vargas	6 June 1995 (aged 28)	13	2	(Colombian Football Federation) Millonarios
4	DF	Keysher Fuller	12 July 1994 (aged 28)	36	3	(Costa Rican Football Federation) Herediano
5	MF	Celso Borges	27 May 1988 (aged 35)	158	27	(Costa Rican Football Federation) Alajuelense
6	DF	Pablo Arboine	3 April 1998 (aged 25)	1	0	(Costa Rican Football Federation) Saprissa
7	FW	Anthony Contreras	29 January 2000 (aged 23)	12	2	(Costa Rican Football Federation) Herediano
8	FW	Josimar Alcócer	7 July 2004 (aged 18)	0	0	(Costa Rican Football Federation) Alajuelense
9	FW	Diego Campos	1 October 1995 (aged 27)	0	0	(Swedish Football Association) Degerfors IF
10	MF	Cristopher Núñez	8 December 1997 (aged 25)	3	0	(Hellenic Football Federation) Lamia
11	MF	Aarón Suárez	27 June 2002 (aged 20)	4	0	(Costa Rican Football Federation) Alajuelense
12	FW	Joel Campbell	26 June 1992 (aged 30)	122	25	(Costa Rican Football Federation) Alajuelense
13	DF	Suhander Zúñiga	15 January 1997 (aged 26)	2	0	(Costa Rican Football Federation) Alajuelense
14	MF	Ricardo Peña	15 July 2004 (aged 18)	0	0	(Royal Spanish Football Federation) Betis B
15	DF	Francisco Calvo	8 July 1992 (aged 30)	77	8	(Turkish Football Federation) Konyaspor
16	MF	Warren Madrigal	24 July 2004 (aged 18)	0	0	(Costa Rican Football Federation) Saprissa
18	GK	Kevin Chamorro	8 April 2000 (aged 23)	0	0	(Costa Rican Football Federation) Saprissa
19	DF	Kendall Waston	1 January 1988 (aged 35)	66	9	(Costa Rican Football Federation) Saprissa
20	MF	Wilmer Azofeifa	4 June 1994 (aged 29)	3	0	(Costa Rican Football Federation) San Carlos
22	DF	Jefry Valverde	10 June 1995 (aged 28)	2	0	(Costa Rican Football Federation) Saprissa
23	GK	Alexandre Lezcano	26 August 2001 (aged 21)	0	0	(Costa Rican Football Federation) Santos de Guápiles
24	MF	Yeltsin Tejeda	17 March 1992 (aged 31)	78	1	(Costa Rican Football Federation) Herediano
25	FW	Kenneth Vargas	17 April 2002 (aged 21)	0	0	(Costa Rican Football Federation) Herediano
The following players were replaced after the group stage:
17	MF	Carlos Mora (injured)	18 March 2001 (aged 22)	3	0	(Costa Rican Football Federation) Alajuelense
21	MF	Roan Wilson (injured)	1 May 2002 (aged 21)	4	0	(Portuguese Football Federation) Gil Vicente

=== Panama ===
Panama's 60-man provisional list was announced by CONCACAF on 1 June 2023. The final squad was announced on 19 June 2023.

After the group stage, defenders Michael Amir Murillo and César Blackman were replaced by Omar Valencia and Iván Anderson due to injuries.

Head coach: (Spain) Thomas Christiansen

No.	Pos.	Player	Date of birth (age)	Caps	Goals	Club
1	GK	Luis Mejía	16 March 1991 (aged 32)	49	0	(Football Federation of Chile) Unión Española
3	DF	Harold Cummings	1 March 1992 (aged 31)	86	1	(Venezuelan Football Federation) Monagas
4	DF	Fidel Escobar	9 January 1995 (aged 28)	65	2	(Costa Rican Football Federation) Saprissa
5	DF	Roderick Miller	3 April 1992 (aged 31)	35	2	(Association of Football Federations of Azerbaijan) Turan Tovuz
6	MF	Cristian Martínez	6 February 1997 (aged 26)	25	0	(Saudi Arabian Football Federation) Najran
7	MF	Jovani Welch	7 December 1999 (aged 23)	6	0	(Portuguese Football Federation) Académico de Viseu
8	MF	Adalberto Carrasquilla	28 November 1998 (aged 24)	39	1	(United States Soccer Federation) Houston Dynamo FC
9	FW	Azarías Londoño	21 June 2001 (aged 22)	3	0	(National Football Federation of Guatemala) Comunicaciones
10	MF	Yoel Bárcenas	23 October 1993 (aged 29)	71	5	(Mexican Football Federation) Mazatlán
11	FW	Ismael Díaz	12 May 1997 (aged 26)	23	5	(Ecuadorian Football Federation) Universidad Católica
12	GK	César Samudio	26 March 1994 (aged 29)	2	0	(National Autonomous Federation of Football of Honduras) Marathón
13	MF	Freddy Góndola	18 September 1995 (aged 27)	14	1	(Costa Rican Football Federation) Alajuelense
14	DF	Eduardo Anderson	31 January 2001 (aged 22)	6	0	(Costa Rican Football Federation) San Carlos
15	DF	Eric Davis	31 March 1991 (aged 32)	76	5	(Slovak Football Association) DAC Dunajská Streda
16	DF	Andrés Andrade	16 October 1998 (aged 24)	21	1	(German Football Association) Arminia Bielefeld
17	FW	José Fajardo	18 August 1993 (aged 29)	31	5	(Peruvian Football Federation) Cusco
18	FW	Cecilio Waterman	13 April 1991 (aged 32)	24	8	(Football Federation of Chile) Cobresal
19	MF	Alberto Quintero	18 December 1987 (aged 35)	130	7	(Peruvian Football Federation) Cienciano
20	MF	Aníbal Godoy	10 February 1990 (aged 33)	126	4	(United States Soccer Federation) Nashville SC
21	MF	César Yanis	28 January 1996 (aged 27)	39	3	(Panamanian Football Federation) Potros del Este
22	GK	Orlando Mosquera	25 December 1994 (aged 28)	11	0	(Venezuelan Football Federation) Monagas
24	DF	Omar Valencia	8 June 2004 (aged 19)	1	0	(United States Soccer Federation) New York Red Bulls II
25	DF	Iván Anderson	24 November 1997 (aged 25)	3	0	(Venezuelan Football Federation) Monagas
The following players were replaced after the group stage:
2	DF	César Blackman (injured)	2 April 1998 (aged 25)	11	0	(Slovak Football Association) DAC Dunajská Streda
23	DF	Michael Amir Murillo (injured)	11 February 1996 (aged 27)	63	6	(Royal Belgian Football Association) Anderlecht

=== El Salvador ===
El Salvador's 46-man provisional list was announced by CONCACAF on 1 June 2023. The final squad was announced on 19 June 2023.

Head coach: (United States) Hugo Pérez

No.	Pos.	Player	Date of birth (age)	Caps	Goals	Club
1	GK	Mario González	20 May 1997 (aged 26)	28	0	(Salvadoran Football Federation) Alianza
2	DF	Erick Cabalceta	9 January 1993 (aged 30)	3	0	(Costa Rican Football Federation) Alajuelense
3	DF	Roberto Domínguez	9 May 1997 (aged 26)	56	1	(Salvadoran Football Federation) FAS
4	DF	Eriq Zavaleta	2 August 1992 (aged 30)	22	2	(United States Soccer Federation) LA Galaxy
5	DF	Ronald Rodríguez	22 September 1998 (aged 24)	26	0	(Salvadoran Football Federation) Águila
6	MF	Narciso Orellana	28 January 1995 (aged 28)	57	1	(Salvadoran Football Federation) Alianza
7	FW	Joshua Pérez	21 January 1998 (aged 25)	16	3	(Italian Football Federation) Montevarchi
8	MF	Brayan Landaverde	27 May 1995 (aged 28)	15	0	(Salvadoran Football Federation) FAS
9	FW	Brayan Gil	28 June 2001 (aged 21)	1	0	(Colombian Football Federation) Deportes Tolima
10	FW	Mayer Gil	7 September 2003 (aged 19)	2	0	(Colombian Football Federation) Alianza Petrolera
11	FW	Cristian Gil	5 November 1996 (aged 26)	12	2	(Salvadoran Football Federation) FAS
12	DF	William Canales	18 February 1995 (aged 28)	1	0	(Salvadoran Football Federation) Alianza
13	MF	Leonardo Menjívar	24 October 2001 (aged 21)	2	0	(Salvadoran Football Federation) Chalatenango
14	MF	Christian Martínez	12 August 1994 (aged 28)	14	0	(Costa Rican Football Federation) San Carlos
15	DF	Alex Roldán	28 July 1996 (aged 26)	20	3	(United States Soccer Federation) Seattle Sounders FC
16	MF	Harold Osorio	20 August 2003 (aged 19)	2	0	(United States Soccer Federation) Chicago Fire
17	MF	Jairo Henríquez	31 August 1993 (aged 29)	35	3	(United States Soccer Federation) Colorado Springs Switchbacks
18	GK	Tomas Romero	19 December 2000 (aged 22)	7	0	(Canadian Soccer Association) Toronto FC
19	FW	Kevin Reyes	28 August 1999 (aged 23)	12	0	(Salvadoran Football Federation) FAS
20	DF	Nelson Blanco	17 August 1999 (aged 23)	8	0	(United States Soccer Federation) North Carolina FC
21	DF	Bryan Tamacas	21 February 1995 (aged 28)	63	0	(United States Soccer Federation) Oakland Roots
22	GK	Óscar Pleitez	6 February 1993 (aged 30)	0	0	(Salvadoran Football Federation) Isidro Metapán
23	MF	Melvin Cartagena	30 July 1999 (aged 23)	3	0	(Salvadoran Football Federation) Águila

=== Martinique ===
Martinique's 35-man provisional list was announced by CONCACAF on 1 June 2023. The final squad was announced on 2 June 2023.

Head coach: Marc Collat

No.	Pos.	Player	Date of birth (age)	Caps	Goals	Club
1	GK	Théo De Percin	1 February 2001 (aged 22)	0	0	(French Football Federation) Auxerre
2	DF	Yordan Thimon	10 September 1996 (aged 26)	12	0	(Ligue de football de la Martinique) Golden Lion
3	DF	Evan Salines	26 March 1998 (aged 25)	2	0	(Ligue de football de la Martinique) Golden Lion
4	DF	Davy Singama	21 January 2001 (aged 22)	2	1	(Ligue de football de la Martinique) Golden Lion
5	DF	Jean-Claude Michalet	8 April 2000 (aged 23)	6	2	(Ligue de football de la Martinique) Golden Lion
6	MF	Jonathan Mexique	10 March 1995 (aged 28)	6	0	(French Football Federation) Châteauroux
7	DF	Ronny Labonne	14 September 1997 (aged 25)	2	0	(French Football Federation) Nîmes
8	MF	Andy Marny	16 July 1995 (aged 27)	9	1	(Ligue de football de la Martinique) Club Colonial
9	FW	Stévyne Baker	17 January 2001 (aged 22)	1	0	(Ligue de football de la Martinique) Diamantinoise
10	FW	Brighton Labeau	1 January 1996 (aged 27)	7	2	(Swiss Football Association) Lausanne-Sport
11	MF	Thomas Ephestion	9 June 1995 (aged 28)	4	0	(Hungarian Football Federation) Mezőkövesdi
12	FW	Enrick Reuperné	3 August 1998 (aged 24)	7	0	(Ligue de football de la Martinique) Assaut
13	FW	Kévin Fortuné	6 August 1989 (aged 33)	12	3	(French Football Federation) Orléans
14	MF	Cyril Mandouki	21 August 1991 (aged 31)	7	1	(French Football Federation) Paris FC
15	DF	Patrick Burner	11 April 1996 (aged 27)	7	0	(French Football Federation) Nîmes
16	GK	Yannis Clementia	5 July 1997 (aged 25)	6	0	(French Football Federation) Caen
17	FW	Karl Fabien	1 August 2000 (aged 22)	5	2	(French Football Federation) Vierzon
18	DF	Jonathan Rivierez	18 May 1989 (aged 34)	7	1	(French Football Federation) Bourg-Péronnas
19	MF	Daniel Hérelle (captain)	17 October 1988 (aged 34)	89	3	(Ligue de football de la Martinique) Samaritaine
20	MF	Ghislain Arbaut	16 August 1999 (aged 23)	5	0	(Ligue de football de la Martinique) Assaut
21	DF	Florian Lapis	8 August 1993 (aged 29)	3	1	(French Football Federation) Versailles
22	DF	Florent Poulolo	2 February 1997 (aged 26)	6	0	(Football Association of the Czech Republic) Sigma Olomouc
23	GK	Emmanuel Vermignon	20 January 1989 (aged 34)	19	0	(Ligue de football de la Martinique) Club Colonial

== Group D ==
=== Canada ===
Canada's 56-man provisional list was announced by CONCACAF on 1 June 2023. The final 23-man list was announced on 19 June 2023. On 26 June, Sam Adekugbe and Stephen Eustáquio withdrew and were replaced by Liam Fraser and Jayden Nelson.

After the group stage, goalkeeper Milan Borjan withdrew due to an injury.

Head coach: (England) John Herdman

No.	Pos.	Player	Date of birth (age)	Caps	Goals	Club
1	GK	Dayne St. Clair	9 May 1997 (aged 26)	2	0	(United States Soccer Federation) Minnesota United FC
2	DF	Zachary Brault-Guillard	30 December 1998 (aged 24)	7	1	(Canadian Soccer Association) CF Montréal
3	MF	Liam Fraser	13 February 1998 (aged 25)	15	0	(Royal Belgian Football Association) Deinze
4	DF	Kamal Miller	16 May 1997 (aged 26)	34	0	(United States Soccer Federation) Inter Miami CF
5	DF	Steven Vitória	11 January 1987 (aged 36)	41	4	(Portuguese Football Federation) Chaves
6	DF	Dominick Zator	18 September 1994 (aged 28)	0	0	(Polish Football Association) Korona Kielce
7	FW	Jayden Nelson	26 September 2002 (aged 20)	4	1	(Norwegian Football Federation) Rosenborg
8	MF	David Wotherspoon	16 January 1990 (aged 33)	11	1	(Scottish Football Association) St Johnstone
9	FW	Lucas Cavallini	28 December 1992 (aged 30)	36	18	(Mexican Football Federation) Tijuana
10	FW	Junior Hoilett	5 June 1990 (aged 33)	55	14	(The Football Association) Reading
11	FW	Liam Millar	27 September 1999 (aged 23)	17	0	(Swiss Football Association) Basel
12	MF	Victor Loturi	21 May 2001 (aged 22)	0	0	(Scottish Football Association) Ross County
13	FW	Jacob Shaffelburg	26 November 1999 (aged 23)	4	0	(United States Soccer Federation) Nashville SC
14	DF	Moïse Bombito	30 March 2000 (aged 23)	0	0	(United States Soccer Federation) Colorado Rapids
15	DF	Zac McGraw	8 June 1997 (aged 26)	0	0	(United States Soccer Federation) Portland Timbers
16	GK	Tom McGill	25 March 2000 (aged 23)	0	0	(The Football Association) Brighton & Hove Albion
17	FW	Jacen Russell-Rowe	13 September 2002 (aged 20)	0	0	(United States Soccer Federation) Columbus Crew
19	FW	Charles-Andreas Brym	8 August 1998 (aged 24)	8	1	(Royal Dutch Football Association) FC Eindhoven
20	MF	Ali Ahmed	10 October 2000 (aged 22)	0	0	(Canadian Soccer Association) Vancouver Whitecaps FC
21	MF	Jonathan Osorio	12 June 1992 (aged 31)	64	8	(Canadian Soccer Association) Toronto FC
22	DF	Richie Laryea	7 January 1995 (aged 28)	41	1	(Canadian Soccer Association) Toronto FC
23	DF	Scott Kennedy	31 March 1997 (aged 26)	12	0	(German Football Association) Jahn Regensburg
The following player withdrew after the group stage:
18	GK	Milan Borjan (injured) (captain)	23 October 1987 (aged 35)	75	0	(Football Association of Serbia) Red Star Belgrade

=== Guatemala ===
Guatemala's 58-man provisional list was announced by CONCACAF on 1 June 2023. The final squad was announced on 19 June 2023.

Head coach: (Mexico) Luis Fernando Tena

No.	Pos.	Player	Date of birth (age)	Caps	Goals	Club
1	GK	Nicholas Hagen	2 August 1996 (aged 26)	27	0	(Norwegian Football Federation) HamKam
2	DF	José Ardón	20 January 2000 (aged 23)	8	0	(National Football Federation of Guatemala) Antigua
3	DF	Nicolás Samayoa	2 August 1995 (aged 27)	7	1	(National Football Federation of Guatemala) Comunicaciones
4	DF	José Carlos Pinto (captain)	16 June 1993 (aged 30)	39	0	(National Football Federation of Guatemala) Comunicaciones
5	MF	Pedro Altán	4 June 1997 (aged 26)	4	0	(National Football Federation of Guatemala) Municipal
6	MF	Carlos Mejía	13 November 1991 (aged 31)	37	5	(National Football Federation of Guatemala) Antigua
7	DF	Aaron Herrera	6 June 1997 (aged 26)	2	0	(Canadian Soccer Association) CF Montréal
8	MF	Rodrigo Saravia	22 February 1993 (aged 30)	42	0	(National Football Federation of Guatemala) Comunicaciones
9	FW	Rubio Rubin	1 March 1996 (aged 27)	10	3	(United States Soccer Federation) Real Salt Lake
10	MF	Antonio López	10 April 1997 (aged 26)	20	0	(National Football Federation of Guatemala) Comunicaciones
11	FW	César Archila	30 July 1993 (aged 29)	3	0	(National Football Federation of Guatemala) Municipal
12	GK	Ricardo Jérez	4 February 1986 (aged 37)	61	0	(United States Soccer Federation) Chattanooga Red Wolves
13	MF	Alejandro Galindo	5 March 1992 (aged 31)	36	6	(National Football Federation of Guatemala) Municipal
14	FW	Darwin Lom	14 July 1997 (aged 25)	20	10	(National Football Federation of Guatemala) Xelajú
15	MF	Marlon Sequen	23 June 1993 (aged 30)	6	1	(National Football Federation of Guatemala) Municipal
16	DF	José Morales	3 December 1996 (aged 26)	18	2	(National Football Federation of Guatemala) Municipal
17	MF	Óscar Castellanos	18 January 2000 (aged 23)	20	1	(National Football Federation of Guatemala) Antigua
18	FW	Nathaniel Mendez-Laing	15 April 1992 (aged 31)	1	0	(The Football Association) Derby County
19	FW	Esteban García	6 March 1998 (aged 25)	1	0	(National Football Federation of Guatemala) Mixco
20	DF	Gerardo Gordillo	17 August 1994 (aged 28)	21	3	(Brazilian Football Confederation) Juventude
21	GK	Fredy Pérez	9 December 1994 (aged 28)	2	0	(National Football Federation of Guatemala) Comunicaciones
22	DF	Stheven Robles	10 November 1995 (aged 27)	28	2	(National Football Federation of Guatemala) Comunicaciones
23	MF	Jorge Aparicio	21 November 1992 (aged 30)	35	1	(National Football Federation of Guatemala) Comunicaciones

=== Cuba ===
Cuba's 33-man provisional list was announced by CONCACAF on 1 June 2023. The final squad was confirmed on 18 June. Roberney Caballero, Denilson Morales, Neisser Sandó and Jassael Herrera defected following their opening match, a 1–0 defeat to Guatemala. Sandy Sanchez defected after the last group stage game against Canada.

Head coach: Pablo Elier Sánchez

No.	Pos.	Player	Date of birth (age)	Caps	Goals	Club
1	GK	Sandy Sánchez	24 May 1994 (aged 29)	29	1	(Dominican Football Federation) Atlético Pantoja
2	DF	Modesto Méndez	6 January 1998 (aged 25)	6	0	(United States Soccer Federation) Inter Miami II
3	DF	Mario Peñalver	6 January 2003 (aged 20)	4	0	(National Football Federation of Guatemala) Deportivo Mixco
4	DF	Cavafe	25 April 1999 (aged 24)	15	2	(Austrian Football Association) Dornbirn
5	DF	Dariel Morejón	21 December 1998 (aged 24)	28	0	(Costa Rican Football Federation) Santa Ana
6	DF	Yosel Piedra	27 March 1994 (aged 29)	35	1	(Costa Rican Football Federation) San Carlos
7	FW	Willian Pozo-Venta	27 August 1997 (aged 25)	13	3	(Football Association of Finland) KTP
8	MF	Eduardo Hernández	18 February 2003 (aged 20)	2	0	(Football Association of Cuba) Santiago de Cuba
9	FW	Maikel Reyes	4 March 1993 (aged 30)	39	8	(Nicaraguan Football Federation) Municipal Jalapa
10	MF	Arichel Hernández (captain)	20 September 1993 (aged 29)	36	7	(National Football Federation of Guatemala) Deportivo Mixco
11	MF	Romario Torrez	9 February 2005 (aged 18)	0	0	(Football Association of Cuba) Artemisa
12	GK	Raiko Arozarena	27 March 1997 (aged 26)	4	0	(United States Soccer Federation) Tampa Bay Rowdies
13	DF	Jorge Corrales	20 May 1991 (aged 32)	42	1	(United States Soccer Federation) FC Tulsa
14	MF	Neisser Sandó	26 October 1998 (aged 24)	8	0	(Football Association of Cuba) Cienfuegos
15	MF	Yunior Pérez	12 March 2001 (aged 22)	14	0	(National Football Federation of Guatemala) Santa Lucía
16	DF	Jassael Herrera	1 January 2002 (aged 21)	0	0	(Football Association of Cuba) Cienfuegos
17	FW	Daniel Díaz	27 March 1994 (aged 29)	3	0	(Costa Rican Football Federation) San Carlos
18	FW	Yasniel Matos	29 March 2002 (aged 21)	14	1	(National Football Federation of Guatemala) Municipal
19	MF	Denilson Milanés	16 December 2002 (aged 20)	5	0	(Costa Rican Football Federation) Desamparados
20	FW	Aldair Ruiz	13 November 1997 (aged 25)	1	0	(Gibraltar Football Association) Europa
21	GK	Nelson Johnston	25 February 1990 (aged 33)	13	0	(Costa Rican Football Federation) Jicaral
22	MF	Roberney Caballero	2 November 1995 (aged 27)	14	3	(Football Association of Cuba) La Habana
23	FW	Luis Paradela	21 January 1997 (aged 26)	30	8	(Costa Rican Football Federation) Saprissa

=== Guadeloupe ===
Guadeloupe's 35-man provisional list was announced by CONCACAF on 9 June 2023. The final squad was announced on 7 June 2023.

Head coach: Jocelyn Angloma

No.	Pos.	Player	Date of birth (age)	Caps	Goals	Club
1	GK	Willy Leguier	17 December 1996 (aged 26)	0	0	(Ligue guadeloupéenne de football) Phare Petit-Canal
2	DF	Mickaël Alphonse	12 July 1989 (aged 33)	14	0	(French Football Federation) Ajaccio
3	DF	Andreaw Gravillon	8 February 1998 (aged 25)	8	1	(Italian Football Federation) Torino
4	DF	Ronan Hauterville	21 November 1989 (aged 33)	17	2	(Ligue guadeloupéenne de football) Phare Petit-Canal
5	DF	Nathanaël Saintini	30 May 2000 (aged 23)	8	0	(Swiss Football Association) Sion
6	MF	Quentin Annette	13 January 1998 (aged 25)	15	0	(Ligue guadeloupéenne de football) Solidarité-Scolaire
7	MF	Johan Rotsen	11 August 1996 (aged 26)	7	0	(French Football Federation) Sète
8	MF	Ange-Freddy Plumain	2 March 1995 (aged 28)	7	0	(Israel Football Association) Bnei Sakhnin
9	FW	Thierry Ambrose	28 March 1997 (aged 26)	10	4	(Royal Belgian Football Association) Oostende
10	FW	Matthias Phaëton	8 January 2000 (aged 23)	15	6	(Bulgarian Football Union) CSKA Sofia
11	FW	Jordan Tell	10 June 1997 (aged 26)	3	1	(French Football Federation) Grenoble
12	FW	Steven Davidas	17 March 1992 (aged 31)	4	1	(Ligue guadeloupéenne de football) La Gauloise
13	DF	Cédric Avinel	11 September 1986 (aged 36)	17	0	(French Football Federation) Ajaccio
14	FW	Vikash Tillé	26 November 1997 (aged 25)	14	1	(Ligue guadeloupéenne de football) Moulien
15	MF	Jordan Leborgne	29 September 1995 (aged 27)	3	0	(French Football Federation) Versailles
16	GK	Brice Cognard	26 April 1990 (aged 33)	3	0	(French Football Federation) Avranches
17	DF	Anthony Baron	29 December 1992 (aged 30)	20	1	(Swiss Football Association) Servette
18	MF	Steve Solvet	20 March 1996 (aged 27)	16	3	(French Football Federation) Orléans
19	DF	Méddy Lina	11 January 1986 (aged 37)	21	0	(Ligue guadeloupéenne de football) Solidarité-Scolaire
20	DF	Stevenson Casimir	3 June 1992 (aged 31)	3	0	(Ligue guadeloupéenne de football) La Gauloise
21	FW	Luther Archimède	17 September 1999 (aged 23)	9	1	(United States Soccer Federation) Sacramento Republic
22	FW	Dimitri Ramothe	8 September 1990 (aged 32)	11	4	(Ligue guadeloupéenne de football) Amical Club
23	GK	Davy Rouyard	17 August 1999 (aged 23)	5	0	(French Football Federation) Bordeaux
