= 2016–17 SKNFA Super League =

SKNFA Super League
- Season: 2016–17
- Champions: Cayon Rockets
- Relegated: SPD United; Sandy Point
- 2018 Caribbean Club Championship: Cayon Rockets; Garden Hotspurs
- Matches played: 120
- Biggest home win: Newtown United 16–0 Sandy Point (22 Apr 2017)
- Biggest away win: Sandy Point 1–8 Garden Hotspurs (6 Dec 2016)
- Highest scoring: Newtown United 16–0 Sandy Point (22 Apr 2017)
- Longest losing run: 23: Sandy Point
- All statistics correct as of 27 April 2017.

The 2016–17 Saint Kitts Premier Division, alternatively known as the SNKFA Super League, is the 37th season of the Saint Kitts Premier Division, the top division of football in Saint Kitts. The league consists of 10 clubs that play 24 matches with a three-match series against each other club. The regular season began on 10 September 2016 and ended on 14 May 2017. The season culminates with the playoffs to determine the league champion that run from 24 May 2017 until 17 June 2017.

Cayon Rockets are the defending champions.

== Table ==
=== Regular season ===
Pos	Team	Pld	W	D	L	GF	GA	GD	Pts	Qualification or relegation
1	St. Paul's United	27	18	4	5	55	15	+40	58	Qualification to the Playoffs
2	Cayon Rockets (C)	27	16	6	5	44	18	+26	54	Qualification to the Playoffs
3	Garden Hotspurs	27	15	8	4	60	30	+30	53	Qualification to the Playoffs
4	Village Superstars	27	14	5	8	63	30	+33	47	Qualification to the Playoffs
5	Conaree	27	13	7	7	44	30	+14	46	
6	Newtown United	27	11	10	6	57	23	+34	43	
7	St. Peters Strikers	27	10	3	14	41	41	0	33	
8	SPD United	27	5	6	16	31	43	−12	21	
9	United Old Road Jets (R)	27	6	3	18	17	45	−28	21	Relegation to SKNFA Division 1
10	Sandy Point (R)	27	1	0	26	8	150	−142	3	Relegation to SKNFA Division 1

Updated to match(es) played on 19 May 2017.
Source: https://www.rsssf.org/tabless/stkitts2017.html
(C) Champions;
(R) Relegated

== Final four ==
The top four finishers of the regular season will participate in the single round-robin "Final Four", to determine the league champion.

=== Table ===
Pos	Team	Pld	W	D	L	GF	GA	GD	Pts	Qualification
1	Cayon Rockets	3	3	0	0	7	1	+6	9	Final
2	Garden Hotspurs	3	1	1	1	5	2	+3	4	Final
3	St. Paul's United	3	1	1	1	2	2	0	4	
4	Village Superstars	3	0	0	3	1	10	−9	0	

Source: https://www.rsssf.org/tabless/stkitts2017.html

=== Matches ===
==== Round 1 ====
May 24, 2017

Cayon Rockets	1–0	Garden Hotspurs

Warner Park, Basseterre

May 24, 2017

St. Paul's United	1–0	Village Superstars

Warner Park, Basseterre

==== Round 2 ====
May 28, 2017

Cayon Rockets	4–0	Village Superstars

Warner Park, Basseterre

May 28, 2017

St. Paul's United	0–0	Garden Hotspurs

Warner Park, Basseterre

==== Round 3 ====
May 30, 2017

Garden Hotspurs	5–1	Village Superstars

Warner Park, Basseterre

May 30, 2017

St. Paul's United	1–2	Cayon Rockets

Warner Park, Basseterre

=== Championship final ===
The top two finishers of the final four will participate in a best two-of-three series to determine the champion. The third leg is only played if necessary.

June 11, 2017

Garden Hotspurs	0–2	Cayon Rockets

Warner Park, Basseterre

June 14, 2017

Cayon Rockets	1–0	Garden Hotspurs

Warner Park, Basseterre

Cayon Rockets won the series 2–0

== See also ==
- 2016–17 N1 League
