= List of football clubs in Saint Kitts and Nevis =

This is a list of football (soccer) clubs in Saint Kitts and Nevis.

- BAS Stoney Grove Strikers
- Bath United
- Beyond Homes All Stars
- BT Cotton Ground United
- Cayon Rockets
- Combined Schools
- Garden Hotspurs FC
- Newtown United FC
- SL Horsford Highlights
- St Paul's United
- St. Peters Strikers FC
- Stones United
- Villa International United
- Village Superstars F.C.
- Dieppe Bay Eagles F.C.
