= Saint Kitts and Nevis national under-20 football team =

Saint Kitts and Nevis U-20
- Association: Saint Kitts and Nevis Football Association
- Confederation: CONCACAF (North America)
- Sub-confederation: CFU (Caribbean)
- FIFA code: SKN

The Saint Kitts and Nevis national under-20 football team represents Saint Kitts and Nevis in international football at this age level and is controlled by the Saint Kitts and Nevis Football Association.

== Current squad ==
- The following players were called up for the 2022 CONCACAF U-20 Championship.
- Match dates: 18 June – 3 July 2022
- Caps and goals correct as of: 18 June 2022
- Names in italics denote players who have been capped for the senior team.

No.	Pos.	Player	Date of birth (age)	Caps	Goals	Club
	GK	Xander Parke	27 June 2004 (age 22)	0	0	(The Football Association) Shrewsbury Town
	GK	Vibert Stephen	21 January 2005 (age 21)	0	0	Unknown
	DF	Rico Browne	28 December 2003 (age 22)	0	0	(The Football Association) Birmingham City
	DF	Landrick Jones	25 June 2004 (age 22)	0	0	(St. Kitts and Nevis Football Association) Newtown United
	DF	Omarion Liburd	3 March 2003 (age 23)	0	0	Unknown
	DF	Ajani Mills	13 December 2003 (age 22)	0	0	(St. Kitts and Nevis Football Association) St. Paul's United
	DF	Dejahne Morris	13 October 2003 (age 23)	0	0	(St. Kitts and Nevis Football Association) Garden Hotspurs
	DF	Jalden Myers	15 September 2003 (age 23)	0	0	Unknown
	MF	Caaja Burnham	2 July 2005 (age 21)	0	0	(St. Kitts and Nevis Football Association) Village Superstars
	MF	Jermaine Chiuta	30 May 2003 (age 23)	0	0	Unknown
	MF	Jabez Dorset	22 March 2004 (age 22)	0	0	(St. Kitts and Nevis Football Association) Village Superstars
	MF	Kenaicy Dorsett	1 January 2004 (age 22)	0	0	Unknown
	MF	Chad Liburd	17 January 2004 (age 22)	0	0	(St. Kitts and Nevis Football Association) Newtown United
	MF	Kaylon Liburd	13 May 2003 (age 23)	0	0	Unknown
	MF	Zion Nisbett	29 March 2005 (age 21)	0	0	Unknown
	FW	Joshua Bradshaw	25 June 2004 (age 22)	0	0	(St. Kitts and Nevis Football Association) Cayon Rockets
	FW	Jahlyan Burt	23 October 2003 (age 22)	0	0	Unknown
	FW	Micaah Garnette	28 May 2003 (age 23)	0	0	(United States Soccer Federation) St. John's Red Storm
	FW	Dequan Joseph	17 July 2004 (age 22)	0	0	Unknown
	FW	Shaheem Prentice	19 May 2003 (age 23)	0	0	(St. Kitts and Nevis Football Association) St. Peters Strikers

== See also ==
- Saint Kitts and Nevis national football team
