= Kennedy Isles =

Saint Kitts and Nevis footballer (1991–2020)

Personal information
- Full name: Kennedy Sylvester Isles
- Date of birth: 25 January 1991
- Place of birth: Basseterre, Saint Kitts and Nevis
- Date of death: 24 January 2020 (aged 28)
- Place of death: Newton, Basseterre, Saint Kitts and Nevis
- Height: 1.78 m (5 ft 10 in)
- Position: Midfielder

Team information
- Current team: Newtown United

Senior career*
Years	Team	Apps	(Gls)
2011–2013	Newtown United		
2013–2015	St. Ann's Rangers		
2015–2016	Morvant Caledonia United		
2016–2018	Garden Hotspurs		
2019–2020	Newtown United		

International career^{‡}
- Saint Kitts and Nevis U17
- Saint Kitts and Nevis U20
2014–2018	Saint Kitts and Nevis	8	(2)
- * Club domestic league appearances and goals ‡ National team caps and goals as of 27 June 2018

Kennedy Sylvester Isles (25 January 1991 – 24 January 2020) was a Saint Kitts and Nevis footballer who played as a midfielder. He played for Newtown United in the SKNFA Super League and the Saint Kitts and Nevis national football team. Isles, who was shot in Newtown, Basseterre, died of gunshot wounds on 24 January 2020, one day shy of his 29th birthday.

== Club career ==
Born in Basseterre, Isles began his career with Newtown United. In 2013, he signed for TT Pro League side St. Ann's Rangers from local Saint Kitts and Nevis side Newtown United. In 2015, he moved to Morvant Caledonia United.

== International career ==
He made his debut for the Saint Kitts and Nevis national football team on 3 September 2014 in a 0-0 draw against Saint Lucia.

=== International goals ===
Scores and results list Saint Kitts and Nevis' goal tally first.

Goal	Date	Venue	Opponent	Score	Result	Competition
1.	10 May 2015	Usain Bolt Sports Complex, Cave Hill, Barbados	Barbados	3–1	3-1	Friendly
2.	26 April 2018	Warner Park, Basseterre, Saint Kitts and Nevis	Jamaica	1–3	1-3	Friendly
