= Football in Saint Kitts and Nevis =

- Country: St. Kitts and Nevis
- Governing body: St. Kitts and Nevis Football Association
- National team: Saint Kitts and Nevis

National competitions
- Saint Kitts and Nevis National Cup

Club competitions
- Men's: SKNFA Premier League

International competitions
- Men's: CONCACAF Champions League; FIFA Club World Cup; CONCACAF Gold Cup (National Team); CONCACAF Nations League (National Team); FIFA World Cup (National Team); Women's: CONCACAF Women's Championship (National Team); FIFA Women's World Cup (National Team)

The sport of association football in the country of Saint Kitts and Nevis is run by the St. Kitts and Nevis Football Association. The association administers the national football team, as well as the SKNFA Super League and the N1 League (inactive since 2010). Association football is the most popular sport in the country after cricket. The national team has had limited international success.

== League system ==
Level	League(s)/Division(s)
1	SKNFA Super League; 10 clubs
	↓↑ 1-2 clubs
2	SKNFA Division 1; 13 clubs
