= Tahir Hanley =

Saint Kitts and Nevis footballer

Tahir Hanly
Personal information
- Date of birth: 5 May 1997 (age 29)
- Height: 1.86 m (6 ft 1 in)
- Position: Forward

Team information
- Current team: Village Superstars

Senior career*
Years	Team	Apps	(Gls)
2013–2017	Garden Hotspurs		
2018–	Village Superstars		(33)

International career^{‡}
2014–2017	Saint Kitts and Nevis U20	9	(6)
2016–	Saint Kitts and Nevis	9	(1)
- * Club domestic league appearances and goals ‡ National team caps and goals as of 00:29, 27 April 2022 (UTC)

Tahir Hanley (born 5 May 1997) is a Saint Kitts and Nevis international footballer who plays for Village Superstars.

== Career ==
Hanley made his debut for the Saint Kitts and Nevis national football team on 31 August 2016 in a 0–0 draw against Nicaragua in a friendly, coming on as a substitute for Carlos Bertie in the 46th minute.

=== International goals ===
Scores and results list Saint Kitts and Nevis' goal tally first.

No.	Date	Venue	Opponent	Score	Result	Competition
1.	5 September 2019	Kirani James Athletic Stadium, St. George's, Grenada	Grenada	1–1	1–2	2019–20 CONCACAF Nations League B

== Honours ==
=== Club ===
Village Superstars

- SKNFA Premier League: 2017–18, 2018–19

=== Individual ===
- SKNFA Premier League Finals MVP: 2017–18

== Personal life ==
Tahir's brothers Tiran Hanley and Tishan Hanley, and cousin Alister Warner have also played international football for Saint Kitts and Nevis.
