= Tiquanny Williams =

Kittian footballer (born 2001)

Personal information
- Full name: Tiquanny Jamor Jaquan Williams
- Date of birth: 10 September 2001 (age 25)
- Place of birth: Saint Kitts and Nevis
- Height: 1.80 m (5 ft 11 in)
- Position: Winger

Team information
- Current team: Old Road Jets
- Number: 7

Youth career
- –2018: St Thomas/Trinity Strikers FC

Senior career*
Years	Team	Apps	(Gls)
2018–2021	United Old Road Jets	53	(34)
2022	Ovarense	3	(1)
2022–2024	United Old Road Jets	26	(23)
2025	Trepça	3	(0)
2025–	United Old Road Jets	25	(45)

International career^{‡}
2021–	Saint Kitts and Nevis	36	(24)
- * Club domestic league appearances and goals ‡ National team caps and goals as of 16:58, 17 November 2026 (UTC)

Tiquanny Jamor Jaquan Williams (born 10 September 2001) is a Kittitian professional footballer who plays as a winger for SKNFA Premier League club Old Road Jets and the Saint Kitts and Nevis national team.

== Club career ==
Williams won the Keith Gumbs Youth Player of the Year award presented by the Saint Kitts and Nevis Football Association in 2018 while playing for St Thomas/Trinity Strikers FC. The award was presented by CONCACAF president Victor Montagliani. The same year he was named the nation's High School Male Footballer of the Year as a student at Verchilds High School.

Williams played for United Old Road Jets FC of the SKNFA Premier League from 2018 to 2022. Through the 2021 season, he made 53 league appearances, scoring 34 goals. Towards the end of the 2021 season, he was leading the league's golden boot race.

In February 2022 Williams joined A.D. Ovarense of Portugal’s Aveiro Football League. During his stint with the club, he made three league appearances, scoring one goal. He made one more appearance in the cup competition. His lone goal was the game-winner in a 3–1 league victory over Fiães SC.

Following his departure from A.D. Ovarense, Williams returned to his former club United Old Road Jets and quickly re-established himself as the league’s top scorer.

In January 2025, he signed for the Kosovan club Trepça. His debut came on the 16 January 2025 in a friendly against Ramiz Sadiku. The deal was initially for two and a half season and made Williams the first player from Saint Kitts and Nevis to sign for a professional club in Eastern Europe.

After his spell in Kosovo, he returned to United Old Road Jets. During the 2025–26 season, he won the SKNFA Premier League Golden Boot and was named the league's Most Valuable Player, helping Old Road win the championship. He also helped the club win the 2026 SKNFA FA Cup. In September 2026, Williams was appointed captain and scored a hat-trick in a 4–1 victory over Conaree in the SKNFA President's Cup, which was the club's first title in the competition.

== International career ==
Williams made five appearances for Saint Kitts and Nevis in the 2018 CONCACAF U-20 Championship. In October 2018 he represented the under-20 team again in the Youth International Series hosted by the Barbados Football Association. He scored his team's second goal in an eventual 2–2 draw with the hosts in the opening match of the tournament.

He made his senior international debut on 8 June 2021 in a 2022 FIFA World Cup qualification match against Trinidad and Tobago.

== Career statistics ==
=== International ===
As of match played 17 November 2026

Appearances and goals by national team and year
National team	Year	Apps	Goals
Saint Kitts and Nevis	2021	3	0
Saint Kitts and Nevis	2023	13	6
Saint Kitts and Nevis	2024	5	4
Saint Kitts and Nevis	2025	7	1
Saint Kitts and Nevis	2026	8	13
Total		36	24

Scores and results list Saint Kitts and Nevis' goal tally first, score column indicates score after each Williams goal.

List of international goals scored by Tiquanny Williams
No.	Date	Venue	Opponent	Score	Result	Competition	Ref.
1	23 March 2023	Raymond E. Guishard Technical Centre, The Valley, Anguilla	Saint Martin	1–0	3–1	2022–23 CONCACAF Nations League C	
2	20 June 2023	DRV PNK Stadium, Fort Lauderdale, United States	French Guiana	1–0	1–1 (4–2 p)	2023 CONCACAF Gold Cup qualification	
3	7 September 2023	SKNFA Football Center Stadium, Basseterre, Saint Kitts and Nevis	Guadeloupe	1–1	1–2	2023–24 CONCACAF Nations League B	
4	12 October 2023	Raymond E. Guishard Technical Centre, The Valley, Anguilla	Sint Maarten	1–0	3–2	2023–24 CONCACAF Nations League B	
5	12 October 2023	Raymond E. Guishard Technical Centre, The Valley, Anguilla	Sint Maarten	2–1	3–2	2023–24 CONCACAF Nations League B	
6	12 October 2023	Raymond E. Guishard Technical Centre, The Valley, Anguilla	Sint Maarten	3–1	3–2	2023–24 CONCACAF Nations League B	
7	7 September 2024	Truman Bodden Staidum, George Town, Cayman Islands	Cayman Islands	2–0	4–1	2024–25 CONCACAF Nations League C	
8	7 September 2024	Truman Bodden Staidum, George Town, Cayman Islands	Cayman Islands	3–0	4–1	2024–25 CONCACAF Nations League C	
9	10 September 2024	Truman Bodden Staidum, George Town, Cayman Islands	British Virgin Islands	1–0	2–0	2024–25 CONCACAF Nations League C	
10	10 September 2024	Truman Bodden Staidum, George Town, Cayman Islands	British Virgin Islands	2–0	2–0	2024–25 CONCACAF Nations League C	
11	6 June 2025	Hasely Crawford Stadium, Port of Spain, Trinidad and Tobago	Trinidad and Tobago	2–2	2–6	2026 FIFA World Cup qualification	
12	30 March 2026	Gelora Bung Karno Stadium, Jakarta, Indonesia	Solomon Islands	2–1	4–2	2026 FIFA Series	
13	25 September 2026	SKNFA Football Center Stadium, Basseterre, Saint Kitts and Nevis	Bonaire	1–1	2–1	2026–27 CONCACAF Nations League B	
14	25 September 2026	SKNFA Football Center Stadium, Basseterre, Saint Kitts and Nevis	Bonaire	2–1	2–1	2026–27 CONCACAF Nations League B	
15	28 September 2026	SKNFA Football Center Stadium, Basseterre, Saint Kitts and Nevis	Grenada	1–0	3–0	2026–27 CONCACAF Nations League B	
16	28 September 2026	SKNFA Football Center Stadium, Basseterre, Saint Kitts and Nevis	Grenada	2–0	3–0	2026–27 CONCACAF Nations League B	
17	28 September 2026	SKNFA Football Center Stadium, Basseterre, Saint Kitts and Nevis	Grenada	3–0	3–0	2026–27 CONCACAF Nations League B	
18	2 October 2026	Hasely Crawford Stadium, Port of Spain, Trinidad and Tobago	Cuba	3–3	3–3	2026–27 CONCACAF Nations League B	
19	5 October 2026	Hasely Crawford Stadium, Port of Spain, Trinidad and Tobago	Cuba	1–0	2–2	2026–27 CONCACAF Nations League B	
20	5 October 2026	Hasely Crawford Stadium, Port of Spain, Trinidad and Tobago	Cuba	2–1	2–2	2026–27 CONCACAF Nations League B	
21	13 November 2026	Estadio La Polar, Havana, Cuba	Grenada	1–0	2–3	2026–27 CONCACAF Nations League B	
22	13 November 2026	Estadio La Polar, Havana, Cuba	Grenada	2–3	2–3	2026–27 CONCACAF Nations League B	
23	17 November 2026	Estadio La Polar, Havana, Cuba	Bonaire	2–2	3–2	2026–27 CONCACAF Nations League B	
24	17 November 2026	Estadio La Polar, Havana, Cuba	Bonaire	3–2	3–2	2026–27 CONCACAF Nations League B	
