= Gerard Williams (footballer) =

Saint Kitts and Nevis footballer

Personal information
- Full name: Gerard Geron Augustus Williams
- Date of birth: 4 June 1988 (age 38)
- Place of birth: Old Road Town, Saint Kitts and Nevis
- Height: 1.89 m (6 ft 2 in)
- Positions: Centre-back; midfielder

Team information
- Current team: TRAU
- Number: 3

Youth career
- 2007–2009: Sunderland

Senior career*
Years	Team	Apps	(Gls)
2006–2007	Old Road Jets		
2009–2018	W Connection	34	(1)
2018–2019	Cayon Rockets	3	(0)
2019–2020	TRAU	13	(1)
2020–2021	Cayon Rockets		
2021–	TRAU	35	(0)

International career^{‡}
- Saint Kitts and Nevis U20
2006–2023	Saint Kitts and Nevis	85	(2)
- * Club domestic league appearances and goals as of 20 March 2023 ‡ National team caps and goals as of 16 November 2023

Gerard Geron Augustus Williams (born 4 June 1988) is a Kittitian professional footballer who plays as a defender for I-League club TRAU and the Saint Kitts and Nevis national team.

== Club career ==
=== Early career ===
Williams began his youth football career at Old Road Jets. Later he joined Sunderland's U21 squad.

=== W Connection ===
In 2007, he signed for TT Pro League heavyweights W Connection from local Saint Kitts and Nevis side Old Road. He appeared in 19 CONCACAF Champions League matches with the Trinidadian side. He won some domestic and international trophies like TT Pro League, Trinidad and Tobago Charity Shield and Caribbean Club Championship with the club from 2009 to 2018.

=== TRAU ===
In 2019, Williams signed for the Indian I-League side TRAU F.C. and represented the Manipuri outfit in 13 league matches. He scored his first goal for the club in a 2–1 win match against Churchill Brothers SC in 2020.

On 25 December 2021, rejoined TRAU ahead of the team's 2021–22 I-League season. In 2022, he appeared with TRAU against NEROCA in "Imphal Derby" in Group-C opener during the 131st edition of Durand Cup, where they were defeated by 3–1.

They later began their league journey of 2022–23 season on 15 November in their 1–1 draw against Aizawl.

== International career ==
He made his international debut for the Saint Kitts and Nevis national team against Barbados on 20 October in 2006.

He scored his first international goal in 2008 against Belize in a 2010 FIFA World Cup Qualification match.

== Career statistics ==
=== International ===
As of match played on 16 November 2023

National team	Year	Apps	Goals
Saint Kitts and Nevis	2006	3	0
Saint Kitts and Nevis	2007	2	0
Saint Kitts and Nevis	2008	5	1
Saint Kitts and Nevis	2009	2	1
Saint Kitts and Nevis	2010	8	0
Saint Kitts and Nevis	2011	6	0
Saint Kitts and Nevis	2012	3	0
Saint Kitts and Nevis	2013	0	0
Saint Kitts and Nevis	2014	6	0
Saint Kitts and Nevis	2015	6	0
Saint Kitts and Nevis	2016	8	0
Saint Kitts and Nevis	2017	6	0
Saint Kitts and Nevis	2018	5	0
Saint Kitts and Nevis	2019	7	0
Saint Kitts and Nevis	2020	0	0
Saint Kitts and Nevis	2021	6	0
Saint Kitts and Nevis	2022	2	0
Saint Kitts and Nevis	2023	10	0
Total		85	2

Scores and results list Saint Kitts and Nevis's goal tally first

No.	Date	Venue	Cap	Opponent	Score	Result	Competition	Ref.
1.	6 February 2008	Estadio Doroteo Guamuch Flores, Guatemala City, Guatemala	6	Belize	1–1	1–3	2010 FIFA World Cup qualification – CONCACAF first round	
2.	12 July 2009	Warner Park Sporting Complex, Basseterre, Saint Kitts and Nevis	11	Trinidad and Tobago	2–2	2–3	Friendly	

== Honours ==
W Connection

- TT Pro League: 2018, 2011–12, 2013–14; runner-up: 2014–15, 2016–17, 2017
- Trinidad and Tobago Charity Shield: 2012, 2015, 2018
- Caribbean Club Championship: 2006, 2009; runner-up: 2012, 2015, 2016

== See also ==
- Saint Kitts and Nevis international footballers
