= Vinceroy Nelson =

Saint Kitts and Nevis footballer

Personal information
- Full name: Vinceroy Desron Nelson
- Date of birth: 10 January 1996 (age 30)
- Height: 1.81 m (5 ft 11 in)
- Position: Forward

Team information
- Current team: St. Paul's United FC

College career
Years	Team	Apps	(Gls)
2017	Kean Cougars	13	(8)

Senior career*
Years	Team	Apps	(Gls)
2015–2017	Cayon Rockets		
2018	Atlantic City FC		
2019–2020	Cayon Rockets	46	(36)
2020–	St. Paul's United FC		(11)

International career^{‡}
- Saint Kitts and Nevis U15
- Saint Kitts and Nevis U17
- Saint Kitts and Nevis U20
2015–	Saint Kitts and Nevis	5	(1)
- * Club domestic league appearances and goals ‡ National team caps and goals as of 22:13, 24 March 2021 (UTC)

Vinceroy Nelson (born 10 January 1996) is a Saint Kitts and Nevis international footballer who plays as a forward for St. Paul's United FC of the Saint Kitts Premier Division.
