= Michael Samuel =

Michael Samuel may refer to:

- Michael Samuel (footballer) (born 1980), Dutch footballer
- Michael Samuel (philanthropist) (born 1952). British businessman and philanthropist
