= Rivers of Living Water FC =

Association football club in Saint Kitts and Nevis

- Full name: Rivers of Living Water Football Club
- Ground: Warner Park; Basseterre, Saint Kitts and Nevis
- Capacity: 3,500
- League: SKNFA Division 1
- 2015–16: SKNFA Super League, 10th (relegated)

Rivers of Living Water FC is a Kittian football club based in Basseterre. The club most recently competed in the SKNFA Super League, the top tier of football in St. Kitts and Nevis. During the 2015–16 season, the club was relegated to the Saint Kitts and Nevis Division 1. The club is named after a Bible verse in the Gospel of John, Chapter 7, verses 37 through 39.
