= 1994 CONCACAF Champions' Cup =

30th edition of premier club football tournament organized by CONCACAF

Tournament details
- Host country: United States
- City: San Jose, California
- Dates: 3 February – 5 February
- Teams: 4 (from 4 associations)

Final positions
- Champions: (Costa Rica) Cartaginés (1st title)
- Runners-up: (Mexico) Atlante

Tournament statistics
- Matches played: 4
- Goals scored: 8 (2 per match)

The 1994 CONCACAF Champions' Cup was the 30th edition of the annual international club football competition held in the CONCACAF region (North America, Central America and the Caribbean), the CONCACAF Champions' Cup. It determined that year's club champion of association football in the CONCACAF region and was played from 12 December 1993 till 5 February 1994.

The teams were split in 2 zones (North/Central and Caribbean). The North/Central zone was split in 3 groups, qualifying the best team of each to the final stage. The winner of the Caribbean zone got the qualification too. All qualifying matches in the tournament were played under the home/away match system, while the final tournament was played in San Jose, California, U.S..

Costa Rican club Cartaginés beat Mexican team Atlante in the final, becoming CONCACAF champion for the first time in their history.

== North and Central American Zone ==
- The winner of each group advanced to the Final Round.

=== Group 1 ===
Preliminary Round

12 December 1993	Real Verdes (Belize)	1–3	(Guatemala) Comunicaciones

22 December 1993	Comunicaciones (Guatemala)	2–1 (5–2 agg.)	(Belize) Real Verdes

- Comunicaciones advanced to First Round.

First Round

1 December 1993	Petrotela (Honduras)	4–1	(Mexico) Monterrey	San Pedro Sula, Honduras
	Alberto García Saavedra 9' 44'; Luis Enrique Cálix 46'; Alexis Duarte 80'		Mario Jáuregui 39'	Stadium: Estadio General Francisco Morazán

7 December 1993	Monterrey (Mexico)	3–2 (4–6 agg.)	(Honduras) Petrotela	Monterrey, Mexico
	Luis Hernández 18'; José Nieves Castro 21'; Mario Jáuregui 42'		Alexis Duarte 27'; Luis Salas 41'	Stadium: Estadio Tecnológico

26 January 1994	Comunicaciones (Guatemala)	2–0	(Costa Rica) Cartaginés	Guatemala City, Guatemala
	Jose Mendez; Carlos Vasquez			Stadium: Estadio Cementos Progreso

2 February 1994	Cartaginés (Costa Rica)	4–0 (4–2 agg.)	(Guatemala) Comunicaciones	Cartago, Costa Rica
	Acuna; Mullins			Stadium: Estadio José Rafael Fello Meza Ivankovich

- Petrotela and Cartaginés advanced to Second Round.

Second Round

16 March 1994	Cartaginés (Costa Rica)	1–0	(Honduras) Petrotela	Cartago, Costa Rica
	Cristian Mena 16'			Stadium: Estadio José Rafael Fello Meza Ivankovich

23 March 1994	Petrotela (Honduras)	2–1 (2–2 agg.) (2–3 p)	(Costa Rica) Cartaginés	San Pedro Sula, Honduras
	Alexis Duarte 27'; Alex Bahr 68'		Cristian Mena 21'	Stadium: Estadio Francisco Morazán

- Cartaginés advanced to CONCACAF Final Tournament.

=== Group 2 ===
Preliminary Round

Team 1	Agg.	Team 2	1st leg	2nd leg
Aurora (Guatemala)	5 - 3	(Belize) La Victoria	2 - 2	3 - 1

- Aurora advance to the First round.

Aurora (Guatemala)	2–2	(Belize) La Victoria	Guatemala City, Guatemala
Washington Castagnero (pk); Edwin Westphal		Edmund Pandy; Norman Pipersburg	Stadium: Estadio Doroteo Guamuch Flores

La Victoria (Belize)	1–3 (3–6 agg.)	(Guatemala) Aurora	Belize City, Belize
Edmund Pandy		Washington Castagnero; Martin Machon; Mynor Jimenez	Stadium: MCC Grounds

First Round

Team 1	Agg.	Team 2	1st leg	2nd leg
Aurora (Guatemala)	9–0	(Nicaragua) Juventus Managua	4–0	5–0
Alianza (El Salvador)	3–2	(United States) Los Angeles Salsa	1–0	2–2

- Aurora and Alianza advance to the Second round.

Juventus Managua (Nicaragua)	0–5	(Guatemala) Aurora	Managua, Nicaragua
		Martin Machon; Rony Archila; Minor Jiménez	Stadium: Estadio Stanley Cayasso

Aurora (Guatemala)	4–0 (9–0 agg.)	(Nicaragua) Juventus Managua	Guatemala City, Guatemala
			Stadium: Estadio Doroteo Guamuch Flores

31 January 1994	Alianza (El Salvador)	1–0	(United States) Los Angeles Salsa	San Salvador, El Salvador
	Milton Melendez 47'			Stadium: Estadio Cuscatlán; Attendance: 4,000

6 February 1994	Los Angeles Salsa (United States)	2–2 (2–3 agg.)	(El Salvador) Alianza	Los Angeles, United States
	Paulinho 10' (unknown)		Joaquin Escobar 22'; Oscar Ulloa 77'	Stadium: Los Angeles Memorial Coliseum; Attendance: 5,285

Second Round

Team 1	Agg.	Team 2	1st leg	2nd leg
Aurora (Guatemala)	2–3	(El Salvador) Alianza	1–1	1–2

- Alianza F.C. advances to the CONCACAF Final tournament.

Aurora (Guatemala)	1–1	(El Salvador) Alianza	Guatemala City, Guatemala
Rony Archilla 55'		Oscar Ulloa 78'	Stadium: Estadio Doroteo Guamuch Flores

Alianza (El Salvador)	2–1 (3–2 agg.)	(Guatemala) Aurora	San Salvador, El Salvador
Oscar Ulloa 56'; Sergio Bufarini 119'		Edwin Westphal 30'	Stadium: Estadio Cuscatlán

=== Group 3 ===
Preliminary Round

Team 1	Agg.	Team 2	1st leg	2nd leg
Diriangén (Nicaragua)	2 - 9	(Costa Rica) Herediano	0 - 5	2 - 4

- Herediano advance to the First round.

December 9, 1993	Diriangén (Nicaragua)	0-5	(Costa Rica) Herediano	Diriamba, Nicaragua
	Nil		Roger Gomez; German Chavarria; Rodinei Martins	Stadium: Estadio Cacique Diriangén

Herediano (Costa Rica)	4–2 (9-2 agg.)	(Nicaragua) Diriangén	Heredia, Costa Rica
Alberto Castillo; Róger Gómez; Nahamán González		Jairo Aguirre	Stadium: Estadio Eladio Rosabal Cordero

First Round

Team 1	Agg.	Team 2	1st leg	2nd leg
Firpo (El Salvador)	2 - 6	(Mexico) Atlante	1 - 4	1 - 2
Olimpia (Honduras)	0 - 2	(Costa Rica) Herediano	0 - 0	0 - 2

- Atlante and Herediano advance to the Second round.

Firpo (El Salvador)	1–4	(Mexico) Atlante	Usulután, El Salvador
Raul Toro		Luis M. Salvador 15' 71'; Gastón Obledo 44'; Roberto Andrade 82'	Stadium: Estadio Sergio Torres

Atlante (Mexico)	2–1 (6-2 agg.)	(El Salvador) Firpo	Hermosillo, Mexico
Miguel Herrera 14'; René Isidoro García 50'		Miguel Herrera own goal 35'	Stadium: Estadio Héroe de Nacozari

Olimpia (Honduras)	0–0	(Costa Rica) Herediano	San Pedro Sula, Honduras
			Stadium: Estadio Francisco Morazán

Herediano (Costa Rica)	2–0 (2-3 agg.)	(Honduras) Olimpia	Heredia, Costa Rica
Roger Gómez; Marvin Obando			Stadium: Estadio Eladio Rosabal Cordero

Second Round

Team 1	Agg.	Team 2	1st leg	2nd leg
Herediano (Costa Rica)	4 - 6	(Mexico) Atlante	3 - 3	1 - 3

- Atlante advances to the CONCACAF Final tournament.

Herediano (Costa Rica)	3-3	(Mexico) Atlante	Heredia, Costa Rica
Juan Carlos Chávez 15'; Roger Gómez 21'; Carlos Javier Angulo 89'		Luis Miguel Salvador 10' 33' 34'	Stadium: Estadio Eladio Rosabal Cordero

Atlante (Mexico)	3-1 (6-4 agg.)	(Costa Rica) Herediano	Mexico City, Mexico
Luis Miguel Salvador 25'; Gastón Obledo 59'; René Isidoro García 73'		Rodinei Martins 78'	Stadium: Estadio de la Ciudad de los Deportes

== Caribbean Zone ==
Preliminary Round

Team 1	Agg.	Team 2	1st leg	2nd leg
RCA (Aruba)	2 - 8	(Suriname) SV Robinhood	2 - 1	0 - 7
River Plate (Aruba)	0 - 2	(Suriname) SV Leo Victor	0 - 0	0 - 2

- SV Robinhood and SV Leo Victor advance to the First round.

RCA (Aruba)	2-1	(Suriname) SV Robinhood

SV Robinhood (Suriname)	7-0 (8-2 agg.)	(Aruba) RCA

River Plate (Aruba)	0–0	(Suriname) SV Leo Victor

SV Leo Victor (Suriname)	2–0 (2-0 agg.)	(Aruba) River Plate

First Round

Team 1	Agg.	Team 2	1st leg	2nd leg
Club Franciscain (Martinique)	6 - 2	(Guadeloupe) Red Star ASC	4 - 1	2 - 1
RKVFC Sithoc (Netherlands Antilles)	4 - 3	(Guadeloupe) Solidarité-Scolaire	4 - 2	0 - 1
Villa Lions (Antigua and Barbuda)	1- 2	(Saint Kitts and Nevis) Newtown United FC	0 - 0	1 - 2
FC AK Regina (French Guiana)	w/o*	(Haiti) Racing Gonaïves		
CRKSV Jong Colombia (Netherlands Antilles)	2 - 1	(Haiti) Violette AC	2 - 0	0 - 1
J&J Construction Parham (Antigua and Barbuda)	0 - 1**	(French Guiana) Union Sportive Sinnamary	0 - 1	
SV Robinhood (Suriname)	3 - 4	(Suriname) SV Leo Victor	1 - 0	2 - 4
Union Sportive Robert (Martinique)	bye			

- Racing Gonaïves withdrew before 1st leg.*
- Parham withdrew before 2nd leg, awarded 0–2 against them**

Club Franciscain (Martinique)	4-1	(Guadeloupe) Red Star (Pointe-á-Pitre)

Red Star (Pointe-á-Pitre) (Guadeloupe)	1–2 (2-6 agg.)	(Martinique) Club Franciscain

RKVFC Sithoc (Netherlands Antilles)	4-2	(Guadeloupe) Solidarité Scolaire (Baie-Mahault)

Solidarité Scolaire (Baie-Mahault) (Guadeloupe)	1-0 (3-4 agg.)	(Netherlands Antilles) RKVFC Sithoc
Dario Donavin

CRKSV Jong Colombia (Netherlands Antilles)	2–0	(Haiti) Violette AC

Violette AC (Haiti)	1-0 (1-2 agg.)	(Netherlands Antilles) CRKSV Jong Colombia

J&J Construction Parham (Antigua and Barbuda)	0-1	(French Guiana) Union Sportive Sinnamary

Union Sportive Sinnamary (French Guiana)	2–0 * (Parham withdrew) (3-0 agg.)	(Antigua and Barbuda) J&J Construction Parham

SV Robinhood (Suriname)	1–0	(Suriname) SV Leo Victor	Paramaribo, Suriname
Gerson Klinker

SV Leo Victor (Suriname)	4-2 (4-3 agg.)	(Suriname) SV Robinhood

Second Round

Team 1	Agg.	Team 2	1st leg	2nd leg
RKVFC Sithoc (Netherlands Antilles)	0 - 3	(Saint Kitts and Nevis) Newtown United FC	0 - 2	0 - 1
Club Franciscain (Martinique)	5 - 2	(French Guiana) Union Sportive Sinnamary	5 - 0	0 - 2
CRKSV Jong Colombia (Netherlands Antilles)	1 - 1; 5-4 (p)	(Suriname) SV Leo Victor	1 - 0	0 - 1
FC AK Regina (French Guiana)	2 - 4	(Martinique) Union Sportive Robert	1 - 1	1 - 3

RKVFC Sithoc (Netherlands Antilles)	0-2	(Saint Kitts and Nevis) Newtown United FC

Newtown United FC (Saint Kitts and Nevis)	1-0 (3-0 agg.)	(Netherlands Antilles) RKVFC Sithoc

Club Franciscain (Martinique)	5–0	(French Guiana) Union Sportive Sinnamary

Union Sportive Sinnamary (French Guiana)	2–0 (2-5 agg.)	(Martinique) Club Franciscain

CRKSV Jong Colombia (Netherlands Antilles)	1–0	(Suriname) SV Leo Victor

SV Leo Victor (Suriname)	1-0 (1-1 (pen 4-5) agg.)	(Netherlands Antilles) CRKSV Jong Colombia

FC AK Regina (French Guiana)	1–1	(Martinique) Union Sportive Robert

Union Sportive Robert (Martinique)	3-1 (4-2 agg.)	(French Guiana) FC AK Regina

Third Round

Team 1	Agg.	Team 2	1st leg	2nd leg
Club Franciscain (Martinique)	2 - 3	(Netherlands Antilles) CRKSV Jong Colombia	2 - 1	0 - 2
Union Sportive Robert (Martinique)	4 - 0	(Saint Kitts and Nevis) Newtown United FC	4 - 0	0 - 0

Club Franciscain (Martinique)	2-1	(Netherlands Antilles) CRKSV Jong Colombia

CRKSV Jong Colombia (Netherlands Antilles)	2–0 (3-2 agg.)	(Martinique) Club Franciscain

Union Sportive Robert (Martinique)	4–0	(Saint Kitts and Nevis) Newtown United FC

Newtown United FC (Saint Kitts and Nevis)	0-0 (0-4 agg.)	(Martinique) Union Sportive Robert

Fourth Round

Team 1	Agg.	Team 2	1st leg	2nd leg
Union Sportive Robert (Martinique)	3 - 2	(Netherlands Antilles) CRKSV Jong Colombia	3 - 0	0 - 2

Union Sportive Robert (Martinique)	3–0	(Netherlands Antilles) CRKSV Jong Colombia

CRKSV Jong Colombia (Netherlands Antilles)	2–0 (2-3 agg.)	(Martinique) Union Sportive Robert

== Final round bracket ==
Semi-finals
3 February - San Jose
(Costa Rica) Cartaginés (p)	0 (5)
(Martinique) Robert	0 (4)
3 February - San Jose
(Mexico) Atlante	2
(El Salvador) Alianza	1

Final
5 February - San Jose
(Costa Rica) Cartaginés	3
(Mexico) Atlante	2
Third place
5 February - San Jose
(Martinique) Robert	0 (2)
(El Salvador) Alianza (p)	0 (4)

== Semifinals ==
February 3, 1995

Cartaginés (Costa Rica)	0–0 (a.e.t.)	(Martinique) Robert
Penalties
	5–4

Spartan Stadium
San Jose, California - United States

February 3, 1995

Atlante (Mexico)	2–1	(El Salvador) Alianza
Salvador 15'; Romano 43'		Durán 47'

Spartan Stadium
San Jose, California - United States

== Third Place Match ==
February 5, 1995

Alianza (El Salvador)	0–0 (a.e.t.)	(Martinique) Robert
Penalties
	4–2

Spartan Stadium, San Jose, California

== Final ==
February 5, 1995

Cartaginés (Costa Rica)	3–2	(Mexico) Atlante
Quiros 20', 32'; Hidalgo 69' (pen.)	Report	García 51'; Obledo 56'

Spartan Stadium, San Jose, California
Attendance: 6,270
Referee: Brian Hall (USA)

Team details

Cartaginés
Atlante

GK	(Costa Rica) Marvin Solórzano	Booked
DF	(Costa Rica) Humberto Brenes
DF	(Costa Rica) Martín Estrada
DF	(Costa Rica) Dager Villalobos
DF	(Costa Rica) Juan Alvarado
MF	(Costa Rica) Alexander Madrigal	Booked
MF	(Brazil) Luiz dos Santos
MF	(Costa Rica) Marco Hidalgo
MF	(Costa Rica) Heriberto Quirós	Sent off (straight red)
FW	(Costa Rica) Bernal Mullins	(yellow card) (substituted off) 76'
FW	(Costa Rica) Ciro Castillo	(substituted off) 61'
Substitutions:
	(Costa Rica) Norman Gómez	(substituted on) 61'
	(Costa Rica) Alejandro Loria	(substituted on) 76'
Manager:
(Brazil) Flavio Ortega

GK	(Mexico) Félix Fernández
DF	(Mexico) Miguel Herrera	Sent off (straight red)
DF	(Uruguay) Wilson Graniolatti
DF	(Mexico) José G. Cruz	(substituted off) 77'
DF	(Mexico) José E. García
MF	(Mexico) Roberto Andrade
MF	(Argentina) Rubén Romano	Booked
MF	(Mexico) Mario García
MF	(Mexico) Gastón Obledo
FW	(Mexico) Luis Salvador
FW	(Mexico) Hugo Sánchez	(yellow card) (substituted off) 46'
Substitutions:
	(Mexico) Jorge Salas	(substituted on) 46'
	(Mexico) Carlos Elizalde	(substituted on) 77'
Manager:
(Argentina) Ricardo Lavolpe

== Champion ==
CONCACAF Champions' Cup
1994 winners
(Costa Rica)
Cartaginés
First title
