= Kimaree Rogers =

Saint Kitts and Nevis footballer

Personal information
- Full name: Kimaree Brian Alister Rogers
- Date of birth: 14 January 1994 (age 32)
- Place of birth: Basseterre, Saint Kitts and Nevis
- Height: 1.78 m (5 ft 10 in)
- Position: Forward

Team information
- Current team: Village Superstars
- Number: 10

Senior career*
| Years | Team | Apps | (Gls) |
| 2013– | Village Superstars | | (61) |

International career^{‡}
- Saint Kitts and Nevis U17
- Saint Kitts and Nevis U23
| 2015– | Saint Kitts and Nevis | 43 | (9) |
- * Club domestic league appearances and goals ‡ National team caps and goals as of 30 July 2025

Kimaree Brian Alister Rogers (born 14 January 1994) is a Saint Kitts and Nevis footballer who plays for Village Superstars and the Saint Kitts and Nevis national team.

== International career ==
At the youth level Rogers played in 2011 CONCACAF U-17 Championship qualifiers and 2015 CONCACAF Men's Olympic Qualifying Championship qualifiers.

He debuted on the senior team in 2016, scoring his first international goal in a 3–0 victory against Bermuda. On 14 October 2018, he scored his second goal for St. Kitts and Nevis in the competition of the CONCACAF Nations League in a 10–0 victory against non-FIFA member Saint Martin.

=== International goals ===
Scores and results list Saint Kitts and Nevis's goal tally first.

| No. | Date | Venue | Opponent | Score | Result | Competition |
|---|---|---|---|---|---|---|
| 1. | 10 May 2015 | Usain Bolt Sports Complex, Cave Hill, Barbados | Barbados | 3–1 | 3–1 | Friendly |
| 2. | 21 February 2016 | Warner Park Sporting Complex, Basseterre, Saint Kitts and Nevis | Bermuda | 2–0 | 3–0 | Friendly |
| 3. | 22 August 2017 | Mumbai Football Arena, Mumbai, India | Mauritius | 1–1 | 1–1 | 2017 Hero Tri-Nation Series |
| 4. | 14 October 2018 | Raymond E. Guishard Technical Centre, The Valley, Anguilla | Saint Martin | 8–0 | 10–0 | 2019–20 CONCACAF Nations League qualifying |
| 5. | 27 March 2021 | Thomas Robinson Stadium, Nassau, Bahamas | Bahamas | 2–0 | 4–0 | 2022 FIFA World Cup qualification |
| 6. | 7 September 2024 | Truman Bodden Sports Complex, George Town, Cayman Islands | Cayman Islands | 1–0 | 4–1 | 2024–25 CONCACAF Nations League C |
| 7. | 24 May 2025 | Stade Thelbert Carti, Quartier-d'Orleans, Saint Martin | Anguilla | 1–0 | 4–2 | 2025 Pelican Cup |
| 8. | 24 May 2025 | Stade Thelbert Carti, Quartier-d'Orleans, Saint Martin | Anguilla | 3–0 | 4–2 | 2025 Pelican Cup |
| 9. | 24 May 2025 | Stade Thelbert Carti, Quartier-d'Orleans, Saint Martin | Anguilla | 4–1 | 4–2 | 2025 Pelican Cup |

== Honours ==
=== Club ===
Village Superstars

- SKNFA Premier League: 2017–18, 2018–19

=== Individual ===
- SKNFA Premier League Player of the Year: 2018
