= Dieppe Bay Eagles F.C. =

Association football club in Saint Kitts and Nevis

Dieppe Bay Eagles
- Full name: Dieppe Bay Eagles F.C.
- Founded: 2005
- Ground: Warner Park Sporting Complex; Basseterre, Saint Kitts and Nevis
- Capacity: 3,500
- League: SKNFA Division 1
- 2025-26: 8th

Dieppe Bay Eagles F.C. is a professional football club based in Dieppe Bay Town that plays in Division 1 of the St. Kitts and Nevis Football Association. Their home stadium is the Warner Park Sporting Complex, which can seat 3,500 people.

The Eagles are noted for their fast-paced, attacking style of play. The club's colors are blue and white. Their crest features an eagle with its wings spread out. The eagle symbolizes freedom, power and strength.

== History ==
The Dieppe Bay Eagles were founded in 2005. The club was promoted but relegated in their first season participating the SKNFA Premier League in the 2017-18 season after they finished 10th (last) place. They were promoted to play in the 2021-22 season of the league but were relegated once more that very season, again finishing last.

They currently stand at 3rd place in the SKNFA Division 1.

== Achievements ==
=== Division 1 champions ===
2019-2020 season

2016-2017 season
