= Mahdi Salem =

Qatari footballer (born 2004)

Personal information
- Full name: Mahdi Salem Al-Mejaba
- Date of birth: 4 April 2004 (age 22)
- Place of birth: Doha, Qatar
- Height: 1.63 m (5 ft 4 in)
- Positions: Attacking midfielder; winger

Team information
- Current team: Umm Salal (on loan from Al-Sadd)
- Number: 44

Youth career
- –2020: Aspire Academy
- 2020–2022: Al-Sadd

Senior career*
Years	Team	Apps	(Gls)
2022–	Al-Sadd	4	(0)
2023–2025	→ Al-Shamal (loan)	25	(2)
2026–	→ Umm Salal (loan)	0	(0)

International career^{‡}
2021–2023	Qatar U20	6	(0)
2023–	Qatar U23	9	(0)
2023–	Qatar	4	(0)
- * Club domestic league appearances and goals as of 1 November 2024 ‡ National team caps and goals as of 11 June 2024

Mahdi Salem Al-Mejaba (born 4 April 2004) is a Qatari professional footballer who plays as an attacking midfielder or winger for Qatari club Umm Salal, on loan from Al-Sadd and the Qatar national football team.

== Club career ==
On 23 September 2021, Salem made his professional debut with Al-Sadd in a Qatar Stars League game against Al-Rayyan.

On 28 August 2023, he was transferred to Al-Shamal.

== International career ==
In June 2023, Salem was named in Qatar national team preliminary squad for the 2023 CONCACAF Gold Cup. At first, he was dropped from the final 23-men squad but later replaced injured Ahmed Alaaeldin. He made his international debut in the group stage game against Mexico and also appeared in the quarter-final game against Panama.

== Honours ==
Al-Sadd

- Qatar Stars League: 2021–22
