= Heriberto Quirós =

Costa Rican footballer (born 1972)

Personal information
- Full name: Heriberto Quirós Linton
- Date of birth: 26 July 1972 (age 54)
- Place of birth: Cartago, Costa Rica
- Height: 1.73 m (5 ft 8 in)
- Position: Forward

Youth career
- Cartaginés

Senior career*
Years	Team	Apps	(Gls)
1993–1999	Cartaginés	208	(54)
1999–2001	Alajuelense	57	(22)
2001	Trujillanos		
2002	Cartaginés	9	(1)
2002–2004	Santos de Guápiles		
2004–2005	Carmelita		

International career^{‡}
1993–1997	Costa Rica	7	(0)
- * Club domestic league appearances and goals ‡ National team caps and goals as of 18 October 2014

Heriberto Quirós Linton (born 26 July 1972) is a retired Costa Rican football player who played for several teams in the Costa Rican Primera División.

== Club career ==
Nicknamed Chimi, he made his debut in the Costa Rican Primera División in 1993 playing with hometown club Cartaginés and he soon become part of the usuals at the starting line-up and one of the most claimed players.

In 1999, Quirós joined Alajuelense and he moved abroad for a spell with Venezuelan side Trujillanos. In summer 2002 he signed for Santos de Guápiles but a serious knee injury hampered his career with the club, finally leaving them after two years of misery for Carmelita.

== International career ==
Quirós made his debut for Costa Rica in a September 1993 friendly match against Saudi Arabia and earned a total of 7 caps, scoring no goals. He represented his country in 1 FIFA World Cup qualification match He also played at the 1997 UNCAF Nations Cup, taking the place of an injured Sandro Alfaro.

His final international was a November 1997 FIFA World Cup qualification match against Canada.

== Personal life ==
Quirós was born one of 8 children of Violeta Linton Foster and raised in Barrio Fátima, Cartago. He is married to Paula Villalobos. His brother, Luis Quirós, also played professionally for Cartaginés and also his brothers Marcos and Carlos played in the Costa Rican Premier Division.
