= Saint Kitts and Nevis National Cup =

The Saint Kitts and Nevis National Cup is the top knockout tournament of the Saint Kitts and Nevis football.

== Winners ==
- 1963 : unknown (final Blackpool vs Rivals)
- 1964 : Rovers
- 1965 : Manchester United 2-0 Garden Hotspurs FC
- 1966-75 : unknown
- 1976 : Village Superstars 0-0 Soho [aet, 4-1 pen]
- 1977-01 : unknown
- 2001–02 : Cayon Rockets
- 2002–03 : Village Superstars 1–0 Newtown United
- 2003–04 : Village Superstars 3–1 Cayon Rockets
- 2004–05 : unknown
- 2005–06 : unknown
- 2006–07 : Newtown United awd Village Superstars
- 2007–08 : unknown
- 2008–09 : unknown
- 2010 : Newtown United 2–0 St. Paul's United
- 2011 : Village Superstars 4–3 Mantab FC
- 2012 : St. Paul's United 2–1 Newtown United
- 2013 : Conaree United 1–1 Newtown United [aet, 5–4 pen]
- 2014 : Newtown United 1–0
- 2015 : Conaree United 2–2 Cayon Rockets [aet, 6–5 pen]
- 2016 : Garden Hotspurs FC 2–1 Conaree United
- 2017 : Village Superstars 1–0 Newtown United
- 2018 : Cayon Rockets 1–1 Conaree United [aet, 4–2 pen]
- 2019 : Newtown United 2–1 Village Superstars
- 2020 : St. Paul's United 2–0 St. Peters Strikers
- 2021–22 : St. Paul's United 2–0 St. Peters Strikers
- 2023 : St. Paul's United 3–2 Village Superstars
- 2024 : United Old Road Jets 2–0 St. Paul's United
- 2025 : Village Superstars 1-0 St. Paul's United
- 2026 : United Old Road Jets 2–2 Conaree United [aet, 5-4 pen]
