= Michael Samuel (footballer) =

Dutch footballer

Michael Samuel (born 22 April 1980 in Amsterdam) is a Dutch footballer who played for Eerste Divisie clubs Stormvogels Telstar and Go Ahead Eagles during the 2001-2007 football seasons.
