= St Thomas/Trinity Strikers FC =

Association football club in Saint Kitts and Nevis

St. Thomas Strikers FC
- Founded: N/A
- Ground: Old Road Town, St. Kitts
- Chairman: N/A
- Manager: N/A
- League: Saint Kitts Premier Division
- 2017–18: 8th

St. Thomas Strikers FC (a.k.a. St. Thomas/Trinity Strikers) are a football club from St. Kitts, currently playing in the Saint Kitts Premier Division (officially known as SKNFA Digicel Premier League). They are based in Old Road Town and the surrounding Trinity area.
