= Mantab United =

Association football club in Saint Kitts and Nevis

Mantab FC
- Full name: Mantab Football Club
- Nickname: Mantab
- Founded: 1980 25 April 1980; 46 years ago
- Ground: Newtown Ground
- Capacity: 1,000
- Manager: Vacant
- League: Saint Kitts Premier Division

Mantab FC is a football club from St Kitts and is currently 9th in the St Kitts premier league.
