= SPD United FC =

Association football club in Saint Kitts and Nevis

Saddlers United FC
- Full name: Saddlers United Football Club
- Ground: Newtown Stadium, Basseterre
- Capacity: 1,000
- League: SKNFA Premier League

Saddlers United Football Club (formerly known as SPD United FC) is a professional football club from Saint Kitts and Nevis, based in Basseterre. It competes in the SKNFA Premier League.
