= SKNFA Premier League =

- Founded: 1932; 94 years ago
- Country: Saint Kitts and Nevis
- Confederation: CONCACAF
- Number of clubs: 10
- Level on pyramid: 1
- Relegation to: SKNFA Division 1
- Domestic cup: National Cup
- International cup: CFU Club Shield
- Current champions: United Old Road Jets (2025–26)
- Most championships: Newtown United (16 titles)
- Top scorer: (Saint Kitts and Nevis) Keithroy Freeman (163 goals)
- Current: 2026–27 SKNFA Premier League

The SKNFA Premier League, known for sponsorship reasons as the SKNFA National Bank Premier League (previously SKNFA Digicel Super League), is the Saint Kitts top division, created in 1932 and organized by the St. Kitts and Nevis Football Association.

It currently has 10 participating clubs and the season lasts from September to May. At the Regular Stage, each club plays the others twice (home and away) and the top four teams qualify to Super Four stage. The qualified teams play each other once and the top two teams from Super Four play a 3-legged Championship Play-off to determine the season champion. The lowest placed team in Regular Stage is relegated to Saint Kitts and Nevis Division 1, from which another one is promoted.

Despite being a league competition in CONCACAF none of the Saint Kitts and Nevis teams played in the recent years in the CFU Club Championship nor CONCACAF Champions' Cup/CONCACAF Champions League. Their last appearance was in CONCACAF Champions' Cup 1994 represented by Newtown United.

== Clubs ==
- Bath United (Bath)
- Cayon Rockets (Cayon)
- Conaree (Basseterre)
- Dieppe Bay Eagles (Dieppe Bay Town)
- Garden Hotspurs (Basseterre)
- Newtown United (Basseterre)
- Saddlers United (Basseterre)
- St. Paul's United (St. Paul's)
- St. Peters Strikers (St. Peters)
- Trafalgar Southstars (Basseterre)
- United Old Road Jets (Basseterre)
- Village Superstars (Champsville)

== Previous winners ==
- 1932-1951: unknown
- 1952: Rovers
- 1953-1962: unknown
- 1963: Manchester United
- 1964: Santos
- 1965: Manchester United
- 1966-1973: unknown
- 1974: Santos
- 1975: Rivals
- 1976: Santos
- 1977: Rivals
- 1978: Village Superstars
- 1979: unknown
- 1980: Village Superstars
- 1981: Newtown United
- 1982-1983: unknown
- 1984: Newtown United
- 1985: unknown
- 1986: Garden Hotspurs
- 1987: Newtown United
- 1988: Newtown United
- 1989: Newtown United
- 1990: Garden Hotspurs
- 1991: Village Superstars
- 1992: Newtown United
- 1993: Newtown United
- 1994: Garden Hotspurs
- 1995: Newtown United
- 1996: Newtown United
- 1997: Newtown United
- 1998: Newtown United
- 1999: St. Paul's United
- 2000–01: Garden Hotspurs
- 2001–02: Cayon Rockets
- 2002–03: Village Superstars
- 2003–04: Newtown United
- 2004–05: Village Superstars
- 2005–06: Village Superstars
- 2006–07: Newtown United
- 2007–08: Newtown United
- 2008–09: St. Paul's United
- 2009–10: Newtown United
- 2010–11: Village Superstars
- 2011–12: Newtown United
- 2012–13: Conaree
- 2013–14: St. Paul's United
- 2014–15: St. Paul's United
- 2015–16: Cayon Rockets
- 2016–17: Cayon Rockets
- 2017–18: Village Superstars
- 2018–19: abandoned
- 2019–20: St. Paul's United
- 2020–21: not held due to COVID-19 pandemic
- 2021–22: St. Paul's United
- 2023: Village Superstars
- 2024: St. Paul's United
- 2025: St. Paul's United
- 2025–26: United Old Road Jets

== Performance by club ==
Club	City	Titles	Last title
Newtown United	Basseterre	16	2011–12
Village Superstars	Basseterre	9	2023
St. Paul's United	St. Paul's	8	2025
Garden Hotspurs	Basseterre	4	2000–01
Cayon Rockets	Cayon	3	2016–17
Santos	?	3	1976
Rivals	?	2	1977
Manchester United	?	2	1965
United Old Road Jets	Basseterre	1	2025–26
Conaree	Basseterre	1	2012–13
Rovers	?	1	1952

== Individual statistics ==
=== Top goalscorers ===
Season	Goalscorer	Club	Goals
2017-18	(Saint Kitts and Nevis) Carlos Bertie	Cayon Rockets	23
2018-19	(Saint Kitts and Nevis) Keithroy Freeman	St. Paul's United FC	16
2019-20	(Saint Kitts and Nevis) Keithroy Freeman	St. Paul's United FC	38
2021-22	(Saint Kitts and Nevis) Keithroy Freeman	St. Paul's United	23
2023	(Saint Kitts and Nevis) Keithroy Freeman	St. Paul's United	26
2024	(Saint Kitts and Nevis) Keithroy Freeman	St. Paul's United	15
2025	(Saint Kitts and Nevis) Keithroy Freeman	St. Paul's United	25
2025-26	(Saint Kitts and Nevis) Tiquanny Williams	Old Road United	36

Most time goalscorer

- 6 times.
  - Keithroy Freeman (2018-19, 2019-20, 2021-22, 2023, 2024 and 2025).

Most goals scored by player a single season

- 38 goals.
  - Keithroy Freeman (2019-20).

=== Multiple hat-tricks ===
Rank	Country	Player	Hat-tricks
1	(Saint Kitts and Nevis)	Keithroy Freeman	14
2	(Saint Kitts and Nevis)	Tiquanny Williams	9
3	(Saint Kitts and Nevis)	Kimaree Rogers	4
4	(Saint Kitts and Nevis)	Carlos Bertie	2
5	(Saint Kitts and Nevis)	Anthony Caines	1
5	(Saint Kitts and Nevis)	Dahjal Kelly	1
5	(Saint Kitts and Nevis)	Kadeen Lewis	1
5	(Saint Kitts and Nevis)	Errol O'Loughlin	1
5	(Saint Kitts and Nevis)	Sean Percival	1
5	(Saint Kitts and Nevis)	Nicquan Phipps	1
5	(Saint Kitts and Nevis)	Kennedy Rodriquez	1
