= SKNFA Division 1 =

- Country: Saint Kitts and Nevis
- Confederation: CONCACAF
- Number of clubs: 13
- Level on pyramid: 2
- Promotion to: Premier League
- Current champions: JONES GROUP SANDY POINT (24/25)

The Saint Kitts and Nevis Division 1 is the 2nd tier of football in Saint Kitts and Nevis. Teams in The Saint Kitts and Nevis Division 1 compete for promotion to the Saint Kitts and Nevis Premier Division.

Teams for the 2024/25 Season:
