= United Old Road Jets FC =

Association football club in Saint Kitts and Nevis

Old Road Jets
- Full name: United Old Road Jets FC
- Nickname: The Jets
- Ground: Warner Park
- Capacity: 3,500
- League: SKNFA Super League
- 2025-26: Champions

The Old Road Jets is a Kittian professional football club based in Basseterre. The team plays their matches at the Warner Park Sporting Complex.

== Achievements ==
- SKNFA Super League (1): 2025-2026
- Saint Kitts and Nevis National Cup: 1

2024
