= St. Kitts and Nevis Football Association =

Governing body of association football in Saint Kitts and Nevis

CONCACAF
- Founded: 1932
- Headquarters: Basseterre
- FIFA affiliation: 1992
- CONCACAF affiliation: 1990 (Associate member), 1992
- President: Atiba Harris
- Website: www.sknfa.com

The St. Kitts and Nevis Football Association is the governing body of football in the country of Saint Kitts and Nevis. They control the Saint Kitts and Nevis national football team.

== Association staff ==
Name	Position	Source
(Saint Kitts and Nevis) Atiba Harris	President	
(United States) Shawn White	Vice-president	
(Saint Kitts and Nevis) Techell McLean	General secretary	
(Dominica) Judin Sabaroche	Treasurer	
(Brazil) Gilberto Damiano	Technical director	
(Brazil) Marcelo Serrano	Team coach (men's)	
(Saint Kitts and Nevis) Earl Jones	Team coach (women's)	
n/a	Media/communications manager	
n/a	Futsal Coordinator	
(Saint Kitts and Nevis) Malcolm Ramsey	Referee coordinator	
