= Conaree FC =

Association football club in Saint Kitts and Nevis

- Full name: Sol Island Conaree Football Club
- Ground: Warner Park
- Capacity: 3,500
- Chairman: Devis Worthington
- Manager: Darick Goodfellow
- League: Saint Kitts and Nevis Premier Division
- 2025-26: 7th

Conaree Football Club is a Saint Kitts and Nevis professional football club based in the Upper Conaree neighborhood of Saint Peter Basseterre Parish. The club currently plays in the Saint Kitts and Nevis Premier Division, the top tier of Saint Kitts and Nevis football.

== Achievements ==
- Saint Kitts and Nevis Premier Division: 1

2012–13

- Saint Kitts and Nevis National Cup: 2

2012–13, 2014–15
