= Cayon Rockets =

Association football club in Saint Kitts and Nevis

- Full name: Cayon Rockets
- Ground: Warner Park Sporting Complex
- Capacity: 8,000
- Chairman: Geraldus Kimberley
- Manager: Godwin Tennesee
- League: Saint Kitts and Nevis Premier Division
- 2025-26: 3rd

Cayon Rockets are a professional football club based in Cayon, Saint Kitts and Nevis.

== History ==
They won their country's football championship in 2001/02, thus becoming the first club from outside Basseterre to do so. They were relegated from the Saint Kitts Premier Division in 2006/07. The club previously played home matches at St Mary's Park.

== Achievements ==
- Saint Kitts and Nevis Premier Division: 3
  - 2001–02, 2015–16, 2016–17
- Saint Kitts and Nevis National Cup: 2
  - 2001–02, 2017–18
