= Village Superstars FC =

Association football club in Saint Kitts and Nevis

- Full name: Rams Village Superstars Football Club
- Founded: 1971; 55 years ago
- Ground: Warner Park Sporting Complex, Basseterre, Saint Kitts and Nevis
- Capacity: 3,500
- Chairman: Frank Maitland
- Manager: Stephen Clarke
- League: Saint Kitts and Nevis Premier Division
- 2025-26: 5th

Rams Village Superstars Football Club is a Saint Kitts and Nevis professional football club from Basseterre.

They usually play in the Saint Kitts and Nevis Premier Division, but due to a conflict between the FA and the majority of the clubs, they didn't take part in 2008/2009.

== History ==
Formerly known just as Superstars, they have won the domestic championship 5 times. The original name is actually Russel Super Stars. Terence Byron is a cofounder and original manager. Samuel Pariall was the original treasurer.

== Current squad ==
Note: Flags indicate national team as defined under FIFA eligibility rules; some limited exceptions apply. Players may hold more than one non-FIFA nationality.

No.	Pos.	Nation	Player
1	GK	SKN	Zhariyon Clarke
2	DF,MF	SKN	Dennis Flemming
4	MF	VGB	Karl Tuitt
5	DF	SKN	Chevoy Rouse
6	DF	SKN	Raheem Francis
8	MF	SKN	Renaldo Clarke
9	FW	SKN	Austin Henry
10	FW	SKN	Kimaree Rogers
11	FW	SKN	Tahir Hanley
12	DF	SKN	Dillon Caines
13	MF	SKN	G'Vaune Amory

No.	Pos.	Nation	Player
14	MF	SKN	Lawrence Jeffers
18	DF	SKN	Leroy Hanley
19	MF	SKN	Kimanee Robin
20	MF	SKN	Jahvante Levi
21	FW	SKN	Tiran Hanley
22	DF	SKN	Yusuf Saunders
23	DF	SKN	Ordell Flemming
24	FW	IRI	Salar Vaseghi
29	MF	SKN	Tyreek Queeley
33	FW	SKN	Travis Somersall
99	GK	SKN	Zeleon Morton

=== Staff ===
Position	Name
Head coach	(Saint Kitts and Nevis) Stephen Clarke

== Achievements ==
- SKNFA Premier League
  - Champions (8): 1980, 1991, 2002–03, 2004–05, 2005–06, 2010–11, 2017–18, 2023
- Saint Kitts and Nevis National Cup
  - Champions (5): 1976, 2002–03, 2003–04, 2010–11, 2016–17
- Carnival Cup
  - Champions (3): 2016, 2017, 2018
- Easter Cup
  - Champions (1): 2019
