= St. Peters Strikers FC =

Association football club in Saint Kitts and Nevis

St. Peters FC
- Full name: St. Peters Football Club
- Founded: 1980; 46 years ago
- Ground: Atiba Erasto Harris Sporting Complex
- Capacity: 1,500
- League: Saint Kitts and Nevis Premier Division
- 2025-26: 2nd

St. Peters Football Club is a Saint Kitts and Nevis professional football club from Basseterre.

They usually play in the Saint Kitts and Nevis Premier Division, but due to a conflict between the FA and the majority of the clubs, they did not take part in 2008/09.

== Current squad ==
Note: Flags indicate national team as defined under FIFA eligibility rules; some limited exceptions apply. Players may hold more than one non-FIFA nationality.

| No. | Pos. | Nation | Player |
|---|---|---|---|
| — | GK | SKN | Delvis Gumbs |
| — | GK | SKN | Kevis Hanley |
| — | DF | SKN | Julan Gordon |
| — | DF | SKN | Delroy Barzey |
| — | DF | NGR | Obinna Nwogbaga |
| — | DF | SKN | Azeem James |
| — | DF | SKN | Dagena Roberts |
| — | DF | SKN | Jahleel Warner |
| — | DF | SKN | Kareem Harris |
| — | DF | SKN | Lyndon David |
| — | MF | SKN | Kejauni David |
| — | MF | SKN | Kirkland Harris |
| — | MF | CMR | David Pierre Ngapet |

| No. | Pos. | Nation | Player |
|---|---|---|---|
| — | MF | SKN | Alvaro Christopher |
| — | MF | SKN | Jamarni Stevens |
| — | MF | SKN | Dionis Stephens |
| — | MF | SKN | Shaquille Barzey |
| — | MF | SKN | Tyquan Terrell |
| — | FW | SKN | Ahijah Wilkes |
| — | FW | SKN | Elandre Govia |
| — | FW | SKN | Kareem Simmonds |
| — | FW | SKN | Tijhaun Isaac |
| — | FW | SKN | Quaniel Simon |
| — | FW | SKN | Oszani Purcell |
| — | FW | SKN | Tulmal Nisbett |

=== Staff ===
| Position | Name |
|---|---|
| Head coach | (Saint Kitts and Nevis) Anthony Isaac |

== Achievements ==
- Easter Cup
  - Champions (1): 2014
- SKNFA Premier League
  - Runners-up (1): 2009-10
