= St. Paul's United FC =

Association football club in Saint Kitts and Nevis

St. Paul's United Strikers
- Full name: S.L. Horsford St Paul's United Football Club
- Short name: STPUFC
- Founded: 1971
- Ground: Warner Park; Basseterre, Saint Kitts and Nevis
- Capacity: 3,500
- Head coach: Derionne Edmeade
- League: Saint Kitts and Nevis Premier Division
- 2025-26: 6th
Home colours	Away colours

St Paul's United Strikers Football Club is a Saint Kitts and Nevis professional football club from St Paul's. They play their home matches at the Warner Park in Basseterre.

They usually play in the Saint Kitts and Nevis Premier Division, but due to a conflict between the FA and the majority of the clubs, they don't take part in 2008/2009.

== History ==
St Paul's United have won the domestic championship five times.

== Results ==
=== International ===
Results list St. Paul's United Strikers FC's goal tally first.

Win Draw Loss Fixture

Competition	Round	Club	Score
2021 Caribbean Club Shield	Group Stage	(Suriname) Inter Moengotapoe	
2021 Caribbean Club Shield	Group Stage	(Puerto Rico) Metropolitan	
2023 CONCACAF Caribbean Shield	Group Stage	(Puerto Rico) Metropolitan	0–2
2023 CONCACAF Caribbean Shield	Group Stage	(Curaçao) Jong Holland	1–2
2023 CONCACAF Caribbean Shield	Group Stage	(Collectivity of Saint Martin) Junior Stars	1–1
2025 CFU Club Shield	Group Stage	Guyana Defence Force	0–2
2025 CFU Club Shield	Group Stage	(Aruba) SV Britannia	0–2
2026 CFU Club Shield	First Round	(United States Virgin Islands) Helenites	0–3

== Achievements ==
- Saint Kitts and Nevis Premier Division: 8

1999, 2008–09, 2013–14, 2014–15, 2019–20, 2021–22, 2024, 2025

- Saint Kitts and Nevis National Cup: 1

2011–12, 2019-20, 2021-22, 2023

== Squad ==
2007/2008 season Note: Flags indicate national team as defined under FIFA eligibility rules; some limited exceptions apply. Players may hold more than one non-FIFA nationality.

No.	Pos.	Nation	Player
1	GK	SKN	Tristan Francis
2	DF	SKN	Thrizen Leader
3		SKN	Stenneth Weekes
4	MF	SKN	Shavon Douglas
5		SKN	Romel Francis
6	FW	SKN	Rohan Francis
7		SKN	Richard Francis
8		SKN	Rashid Hodge
9		BRA	Andre Mendes
10		SKN	Marvin Buchanan
11		SKN	Linsworth Francis
12		SKN	Leroy James
13	MF	SKN	Leroy Francis
14		SKN	Lance Mason
15		SKN	Lance Lewis
16		SSD	Eldeen Jackson
17		SKN	Keyshaun Ward
18		SKN	Kevin Benjamin

No.	Pos.	Nation	Player
19	GK	SKN	Kaiyan Benjamin
20		SKN	Joeski Francis
21	MF	SKN	Joash Leader
22		SKN	Leroy Hanley
23		SKN	Jahren Leader
24	MF	SKN	George Isaac
25		SKN	Dwyer Edmeade
26		SKN	Deshaun Francis
27		SKN	Denroy Matthew
28		SKN	Delvin Harris
29		SKN	Darrell Challenger
30		SKN	Crios Freeman
31		SKN	Allanje Rogers
32		SKN	Darren Caines
33	GK	SKN	Calvert Bennett
34	FW	SKN	Javeim Blanchette

== Topscorer ==
Keithroy Freeman
Detail	Premier League	FA Cup	President Cup	Carnival Cup	Total
Goals	163	12	4	2	181
Topcorers	6				6
Hat-tricks	7				7
