= Newtown United FC =

Association football club in Saint Kitts and Nevis

- Full name: Newtown United Football Club
- Nickname: The Reds
- Founded: 1974
- Ground: Newtown Football Stadium
- Capacity: 3,000
- League: Saint Kitts and Nevis Premier Division
- 2025-26: 4th

Newtown United Football Club is a Saint Kitts and Nevis professional football club from East Basseterre.

They currently play in the Saint Kitts and Nevis Premier Division.

== History ==
Newtown United FC were originally called Zip Side Football Team and was formed with Leroy Ponteen and Earl Clarke among the first teams to participate in the Third (3rd) Division. Zip Side secured its first win in its first game and won the Third Division to get promoted to the Second (2nd) Division under that name in 1973 before changing to their current name. The team's name was changed to Newtown United to encourage wider community supporters and a more representative team. They were then relegated back to the Third Division but regained their Second Division place and were promoted to the top level in 1975 after beating Superstars 2–1 in a playoff.

They have won the domestic championship 16 times.

During the 2015–2016 season, the club stormed to a historic start. As of February 25, 2016, the team had a very comforting lead atop the table of 4 points and were looking unstoppable.

== Trophy history ==
- Saint Kitts and Nevis Premier Division

1981, 1984, 1987, 1988, 1989, 1992, 1993, 1995, 1996, 1997, 1998, 2003–04, 2006–07, 2007–08, 2009–10, 2011–12

- Saint Kitts and Nevis National Cup

2006–07, 2009–10

== Performance in CONCACAF competitions ==
- CONCACAF Champions' Cup: 1 appearance

1994 – Third Round – (Caribbean Zone) – Lost against (Martinique) US Robert 4 – 0 on aggregate (stage 4 of 7)

== Top scorer ==
- Keith Gumbs
  - 196 goals
