= Garden Hotspurs FC =

Association football club in Saint Kitts and Nevis

- Full name: Garden Hotspurs Football Club
- Nickname: Spurs
- Founded: 1962
- Ground: The Garden
- Capacity: 5,000
- Chairman: Zephaniah Patterson
- Manager: Akeel Bramall
- League: Saint Kitts and Nevis Division One
- 2025: 3rd

Garden Hotspurs Football Club is a Saint Kitts and Nevis professional football club from Basseterre. They play in the Saint Kitts and Nevis Premier Division.

== History ==
Founded in 1962, Hotspurs have won the domestic championship 4 times.

== Achievements ==
- Saint Kitts and Nevis Premier Division: 4

1986, 1990, 1994, 2000–01

- Saint Kitts and Nevis National Cup: 1

2015–16
