= 2015 CONCACAF Men's Olympic Qualifying Championship qualification =

The 2015 CONCACAF Men's Olympic Qualifying Championship qualification was a men's under-23 football competition which decided the participating teams of the 2015 CONCACAF Men's Olympic Qualifying Championship. Players born on or after 1 January 1993 were eligible to compete in the tournament.

A total of eight teams qualified to play in the final tournament, where the berths were allocated to the three regional zones as follows:

- Three teams from the North American Zone (NAFU), i.e., Canada, Mexico and the hosts United States, who all qualified automatically
- Three teams from the Central American Zone (UNCAF)
- Two teams from the Caribbean Zone (CFU)

The top two teams of the final tournament qualified for the 2016 Summer Olympics men's football tournament in Brazil, while the third-placed team advanced to the CONCACAF–CONMEBOL play-off against the 2015 South American Youth Football Championship runner-up for the final berth in the Olympics.

== Teams ==
A total of 27 CONCACAF member national teams entered the tournament. Among them, three teams qualified automatically for the final tournament, and 24 teams entered the regional qualifying competitions.

Zone	Teams entering	No. of teams
North American Zone (NAFU)	Canada (qualified automatically for final tournament); Mexico (qualified automatically for final tournament); United States (qualified automatically for final tournament)	3
Central American Zone (UNCAF)	Belize; Costa Rica; El Salvador; Guatemala; Honduras; Nicaragua; Panama	7
Caribbean Zone (CFU)	Antigua and Barbuda; Aruba; Barbados; Cayman Islands; Cuba; Curaçao^{1}; Dominica; Dominican Republic; Guyana; Haiti; Jamaica; Puerto Rico; Saint Kitts and Nevis; Saint Lucia; Saint Vincent and the Grenadines; Suriname; Trinidad and Tobago	17

Did not enter
North American Zone (NAFU)	None
Central American Zone (UNCAF)	None
Caribbean Zone (CFU)	Anguilla^{1}; Bahamas; Bermuda; Bonaire^{1}; British Virgin Islands; French Guiana^{1}; Grenada; Guadeloupe^{1}; Martinique^{1}; Montserrat^{1}; Saint Martin^{1}; Sint Maarten^{1}; Turks and Caicos Islands^{1}; U.S. Virgin Islands

Notes
^{1} Non-IOC member, ineligible for Olympics.

== Central American Zone ==
2015 CONCACAF Men's Olympic Qualifying Championship qualification (Central American Zone)
Eliminatoria Preolimpica Masculina de UNCAF 2015

Tournament details
- Host countries: Panama (group A); Guatemala (group B); Costa Rica and Guatemala (repechage playoff)
- Dates: 11–23 August 2015
- Teams: 7 (from 1 sub-confederation)

Tournament statistics
- Matches played: 11
- Goals scored: 26 (2.36 per match)
- Top scorer(s): (Guatemala) Júnior Andrade (Panama) Édgar Joel Bárcenas (Nicaragua) Carlos Chavarría (Honduras) Joshua Nieto (Honduras) Óscar Salas (2 goals each)

In the Central American Zone, all seven UNCAF member national teams entered the qualifying competition. They were divided into two groups, one with four teams and the other with three teams. The draw to allocate teams to each group was made on 28 February 2015 at the UNCAF Executive Committee meeting in Managua, Nicaragua. The groups were played between 11 and 15 August 2015 in Panama (group A) and Guatemala (group B) respectively. The two group winners and the winner of the repechage playoff between the two group runners-up (two-legged tie), played between 19 and 23 August 2015, qualified for the final tournament as the UNCAF representatives.

Times UTC−5 for group A; UTC−6 for group B and repechage playoff.

=== Group A ===
Pos	Team	Pld	W	D	L	GF	GA	GD	Pts	Qualification
1	Panama (H)	3	2	1	0	6	2	+4	7	2015 CONCACAF Men's Olympic Qualifying Championship
2	Costa Rica	3	0	3	0	2	2	0	3	Repechage playoff
3	El Salvador	3	0	2	1	3	4	−1	2	
4	Nicaragua	3	0	2	1	3	6	−3	2	

Source: UNCAF
(H) Hosts
11 August 2015
17:00

Nicaragua	1–1	El Salvador
Chavarría 24'	Report	Peña 17'

Estadio Maracaná, Panama City
Referee: Juan Guerra (Guatemala)
11 August 2015
20:00

Panama	0–0	Costa Rica
	Report

Estadio Maracaná, Panama City
Referee: Óscar Moncada (Honduras)

13 August 2015
17:00

El Salvador	0–0	Costa Rica
	Report

Estadio Maracaná, Panama City
Referee: Melvin Matamoros (Honduras)
13 August 2015
20:00

Panama	3–0	Nicaragua
Bárcenas 31'; Simons 32'; Muñoz 36'	Report

Estadio Maracaná, Panama City
Referee: Christopher Reid (Belize)

15 August 2015
17:00

Costa Rica	2–2	Nicaragua
Cruz 15'; Lassiter 72'	Report	Chavarría 80'; Silva 89'

Estadio Maracaná, Panama City
Referee: Juan Guerra (Guatemala)
15 August 2015
20:00

Panama	3–2	El Salvador
Hormechea 2'; Narbón 30'; Bárcenas 80'	Report	Lemus 32'; Mejía 61' (pen.)

Estadio Maracaná, Panama City
Referee: Óscar Moncada (Honduras)

=== Group B ===
Pos	Team	Pld	W	D	L	GF	GA	GD	Pts	Qualification
1	Honduras	2	2	0	0	7	1	+6	6	2015 CONCACAF Men's Olympic Qualifying Championship
2	Guatemala (H)	2	1	0	1	4	2	+2	3	Repechage playoff
3	Belize	2	0	0	2	0	8	−8	0	

Source: UNCAF
(H) Hosts
11 August 2015
12:00

Belize	0–5	Honduras
	Report	Elis 25'; Ramírez 45+1'; Salas 50', 54'; Acosta 83'

Estadio El Trébol, Guatemala City
Referee: Óscar Dávila (Nicaragua)

13 August 2015
11:00

Guatemala	1–2	Honduras
Longo 54'	Report	Nieto 65', 85'

Estadio El Trébol, Guatemala City
Referee: Emler Bonilla (El Salvador)

15 August 2015
11:00

Guatemala	3–0	Belize
Andrade 3', 41'; Mérida 84'	Report

Estadio El Trébol, Guatemala City
Referee: Jafeth Perea (Panama)

=== Repechage playoff ===
19 August 2015
19:00

Guatemala	0–0	Costa Rica
	Report

Estadio Mateo Flores, Guatemala City
Referee: David Gantar (Canada)

23 August 2015
13:15

Costa Rica	1–0	Guatemala
Matarrita 56'	Report

Estadio Ricardo Saprissa Aymá, Tibás
Referee: César Arturo Ramos (Mexico)

Costa Rica won 1–0 on aggregate and qualified for 2015 CONCACAF Men's Olympic Qualifying Championship.

=== Goalscorers ===
2 goals

- (Guatemala) Júnior Andrade
- (Honduras) Joshua Nieto
- (Honduras) Óscar Salas
- (Nicaragua) Carlos Chavarría
- (Panama) Édgar Joel Bárcenas

1 goal

- (Costa Rica) Allan Cruz
- (Costa Rica) Ariel Lassiter
- (Costa Rica) Ronald Matarrita
- (El Salvador) Miguel Lemus
- (El Salvador) Rommel Mejía
- (El Salvador) José Ángel Peña
- (Guatemala) José Longo
- (Guatemala) Kevin Mérida
- (Honduras) Bryan Acosta
- (Honduras) Alberth Elis
- (Honduras) Marlon Ramírez
- (Nicaragua) Axel Silva
- (Panama) Chin Hormechea
- (Panama) José Muñoz
- (Panama) Francisco Narbón
- (Panama) Justin Simons

Source: CONCACAF.com

== Caribbean Zone ==
2015 CONCACAF Men's Olympic Qualifying Championship qualification (Caribbean Zone)
2015 CFU Men's Olympic Qualifier

Tournament details
- Host countries: Saint Vincent and the Grenadines (preliminary round); Haiti (group 1 and final round); Antigua and Barbuda (group 2); Dominican Republic (group 3); Puerto Rico (group 4)
- Dates: 22 May – 16 August 2015
- Teams: 17 (from 1 sub-confederation)

Final positions
- Champions: Haiti
- Runners-up: Cuba
- Third place: Jamaica
- Fourth place: Saint Vincent and the Grenadines

Tournament statistics
- Matches played: 24
- Goals scored: 99 (4.13 per match)
- Top scorer: (Cuba) Maikel Reyes (7 goals)

In the Caribbean Zone, 17 CFU member national teams entered the qualifying competition. Among them, two teams (Dominica and Saint Vincent and the Grenadines) played in the preliminary round (two-legged tie) between 22 and 24 May 2015. The winner advanced to the first round to join the other 15 teams.

In the first round, the 16 teams were divided into four groups of four teams. The groups were played between 24–28 and 25–29 June 2015 and hosted by one of the teams in each group. The four group winners advanced to the final round.

In the final round, played between 14 and 16 August 2015 and hosted by one of the teams in the final round, the four teams played a single-elimination tournament. The top two teams qualified for the final tournament as the CFU representatives.

Times UTC−4.

=== Preliminary round ===
Matches played in Saint Vincent and the Grenadines.

22 May 2015
15:30

Dominica	0–2	Saint Vincent and the Grenadines
	Report	Joseph 5' (o.g.); Anderson 90' (pen.)

Arnos Vale Stadium, Kingstown
Attendance: 320
Referee: Leo Clarke (Saint Lucia)

24 May 2015
15:30

Saint Vincent and the Grenadines	3–0	Dominica
Anderson 51'; Slater 70'; Cunningham 90'	Report

Arnos Vale Stadium, Kingstown
Attendance: 410
Referee: Vivian Robinson (Saint Lucia)

Saint Vincent and the Grenadines won 5–0 on aggregate and advanced to Group 4.

=== First round ===
==== Group 1 ====
Matches played in Haiti.

Pos	Team	Pld	W	D	L	GF	GA	GD	Pts	Qualification
1	Haiti (H)	3	3	0	0	9	1	+8	9	Final round
2	Saint Kitts and Nevis	3	2	0	1	9	4	+5	6	
3	Barbados	3	1	0	2	2	4	−2	3	
4	Cayman Islands	3	0	0	3	0	11	−11	0	

Source: CFU
(H) Hosts
24 June 2015
16:00

Cayman Islands	0–6	Saint Kitts and Nevis
	Report	Freeman 16'; Panayiotou 31'; Rogers 50'; Kelly 81'; Nelson 86'; Samuel 90+2'

Stade Sylvio Cator, Port-au-Prince
Referee: Wilson da Costa (Bahamas)
24 June 2015
18:30

Haiti	2–0	Barbados
James 41'; Estama 45'	Report

Stade Sylvio Cator, Port-au-Prince
Referee: Jafeth Perea (Panama)

26 June 2015
16:00

Saint Kitts and Nevis	2–1	Barbados
Panayiotou 45'; Walwyn 85'	Report	Barzey 55' (o.g.)

Stade Sylvio Cator, Port-au-Prince
Referee: Jeffrey Solis (Costa Rica)
26 June 2015
18:30

Haiti	4–0	Cayman Islands
Cherenfant 39', 90+2'; Christian 45+1'; Telfort 55' (pen.)	Report

Stade Sylvio Cator, Port-au-Prince
Referee: Ameth Sanchez (Panama)

28 June 2015
16:00

Barbados	1–0	Cayman Islands
Headley 65'	Report

Stade Sylvio Cator, Port-au-Prince
Referee: Jafeth Perea (Panama)
28 June 2015
18:30

Haiti	3–1	Saint Kitts and Nevis
Cherenfant 10'; Telfort 29'; Désiré 38' (pen.)	Report	Rogers 49'

Stade Sylvio Cator, Port-au-Prince
Referee: Ameth Sanchez (Panama)

==== Group 2 ====
Matches played in Antigua and Barbuda (changed from original hosts Aruba).

Pos	Team	Pld	W	D	L	GF	GA	GD	Pts	Qualification
1	Cuba	3	3	0	0	16	3	+13	9	Final round
2	Antigua and Barbuda (H)	3	2	0	1	11	3	+8	6	
3	Guyana	3	1	0	2	5	4	+1	3	
4	Aruba	3	0	0	3	1	23	−22	0	

Source: CFU
(H) Hosts
24 June 2015
15:30

Cuba	2–0	Guyana
López 7'; Pérez 41'	Report

Antigua Recreation Ground, St. John's
Referee: William Anderson (Puerto Rico)
24 June 2015
18:00

Antigua and Barbuda	7–0	Aruba
Kirwan 21'; J. Stevens 31', 41'; Romeo 45', 90+2'; McDonald 46'; Jahraldo-Martin 59'	Report

Antigua Recreation Ground, St. John's
Referee: Trevor Taylor (Barbados)

26 June 2015
15:30

Aruba	1–11	Cuba
Ruiz 42' (pen.)	Report	López 7', 52'; Sáez 12', 32'; Urgelles 22'; Reyes 28', 46', 48', 61', 65'; Morales 72'

Antigua Recreation Ground, St. John's
Referee: Kimbell Ward (Saint Kitts and Nevis)
26 June 2015
18:00

Antigua and Barbuda	2–0	Guyana
Thomas 3', 30'	Report

Antigua Recreation Ground, St. John's
Referee: Juniel Adelina (Curaçao)

28 June 2015
15:30

Guyana	5–0	Aruba
Garnett 32'; Bobb 49', 66'; Wilson 50'; Schultz 88'	Report

Antigua Recreation Ground, St. John's
Referee: Kimbell Ward (Saint Kitts and Nevis)
28 June 2015
18:00

Antigua and Barbuda	2–3	Cuba
Harriette 74'; McDonald 85'	Report	Hernández 27'; Reyes 81'; Morales 90+1'

Antigua Recreation Ground, St. John's
Referee: Trevor Taylor (Barbados)

==== Group 3 ====
Matches played in Dominican Republic (changed from original host Saint Lucia).

Pos	Team	Pld	W	D	L	GF	GA	GD	Pts	Qualification
1	Jamaica	2	2	0	0	10	1	+9	6	Final round
2	Dominican Republic (H)	2	1	0	1	3	4	−1	3	
3	Saint Lucia	2	0	0	2	1	9	−8	0	
4	Curaçao	0	0	0	0	0	0	0	0	Withdrew

Source: CFU
(H) Hosts
24 June 2015
16:00

Saint Lucia	1–6	Jamaica
Henry 29'	Report	Seaton 3', 38'; Loza 48'; Lewis 56'; Flemmings 75'; Williams 77'

Estadio Olímpico Félix Sánchez, Santo Domingo
Referee: Sherwin Moore (Guyana)

26 June 2015
16:00

Dominican Republic	3–0	Saint Lucia
Ramírez 35'; Martínez 80'; Lombardi 90+4'	Report

Estadio Olímpico Félix Sánchez, Santo Domingo
Referee: Adrian Skeete (Barbados)

28 June 2015
16:00

Dominican Republic	0–4	Jamaica
	Report	Seaton 36'; McFarlane 63'; Williams 72'; Wilson 87'

Estadio Olímpico Félix Sánchez, Santo Domingo
Referee: Sherwin Moore (Guyana)

==== Group 4 ====
Matches played in Puerto Rico.

Pos	Team	Pld	W	D	L	GF	GA	GD	Pts	Qualification
1	Saint Vincent and the Grenadines	2	1	1	0	7	5	+2	4	Final round
2	Trinidad and Tobago	2	1	0	1	8	5	+3	3	
3	Puerto Rico (H)	2	0	1	1	2	7	−5	1	
4	Suriname	0	0	0	0	0	0	0	0	Withdrew

Source: CFU
(H) Hosts
25 June 2015
19:30

Puerto Rico	2–2	Saint Vincent and the Grenadines
Nugent 9'; Strain 75'	Report	Solomon 13'; Anderson 81'

Juan Ramón Loubriel Stadium, Bayamón
Attendance: 600
Referee: Dwight Royal (Jamaica)

27 June 2015
20:00

Trinidad and Tobago	3–5	Saint Vincent and the Grenadines
Winchester 65'; Roach 76'; John 89'	Report	Slater 18', 39', 86'; Anderson 19'; Miguel 43'

Juan Ramón Loubriel Stadium, Bayamón
Referee: Valdin Legister (Jamaica)

29 June 2015
20:00

Puerto Rico	0–5	Trinidad and Tobago
	Report	Winchester 5'; Andrews 62'; Roach 76'; John 82', 89'

Juan Ramón Loubriel Stadium, Bayamón
Referee: Mario Escobar (Guatemala)

=== Final round ===
Matches played in Haiti.

==== Semi-finals ====
Winners qualified for 2015 CONCACAF Men's Olympic Qualifying Championship.

14 August 2015
16:00

Cuba	2–1	Jamaica
Hernández 7'; Reyes 86'	Report	Piedra 50' (o.g.)

Stade Sylvio Cator, Port-au-Prince
Referee: Kimbell Ward (Saint Kitts and Nevis)
14 August 2015
18:30

Haiti	1–0	Saint Vincent and the Grenadines
Estama 64' (pen.)	Report

Stade Sylvio Cator, Port-au-Prince
Referee: Javier Santos (Puerto Rico)

==== Third place playoff ====
16 August 2015
16:00

Jamaica	3–2 (a.e.t.)	Saint Vincent and the Grenadines
Williams 8'; Seaton 25', 100'	Report	Cunningham 15'; Anderson 53'

Stade Sylvio Cator, Port-au-Prince

==== Final ====
16 August 2015
18:30

Cuba	0–1	Haiti
	Report	Désiré 19'

Stade Sylvio Cator, Port-au-Prince

=== Goalscorers ===
7 goals

- (Cuba) Maikel Reyes

5 goals

- (Jamaica) Michael Seaton
- (Saint Vincent and the Grenadines) Oalex Anderson

4 goals

- (Saint Vincent and the Grenadines) Tevin Slater

3 goals

- (Cuba) Frank Manuel López
- (Haiti) Woodensky Cherenfant
- (Jamaica) Romario Williams
- (Trinidad and Tobago) Ricardo John

2 goals

- (Antigua and Barbuda) Elijah McDonald
- (Antigua and Barbuda) Mahlon Romeo
- (Antigua and Barbuda) Javorn Stevens
- (Antigua and Barbuda) Elvis Thomas
- (Cuba) Arichel Hernández
- (Cuba) Héctor Morales
- (Cuba) Daniel Luis Sáez
- (Guyana) Trayon Bobb
- (Haiti) Jonel Désiré
- (Haiti) Benchy Estama
- (Haiti) Mancini Telfort
- (Saint Kitts and Nevis) Harry Panayiotou
- (Saint Kitts and Nevis) Kimaree Rogers
- (Saint Vincent and the Grenadines) Chavel Cunningham
- (Trinidad and Tobago) Akeem Roach
- (Trinidad and Tobago) Rundell Winchester

1 goal

- (Antigua and Barbuda) Tevaughn Harriette
- (Antigua and Barbuda) Calaum Jahraldo-Martin
- (Antigua and Barbuda) Eugene Kirwan
- (Aruba) Jonathan Ruiz
- (Barbados) Shaquille Barzey
- (Barbados) Kemar Headley
- (Cuba) Dairon Pérez
- (Cuba) David Urgelles
- (Dominican Republic) Geremy Lombardi
- (Dominican Republic) Pedro Emil Martínez
- (Dominican Republic) Miguel de Jesús Ramírez
- (Guyana) Domini Garnett
- (Guyana) Pernell Schultz
- (Guyana) Daniel Wilson
- (Haiti) Alex Junior Christian
- (Haiti) Jean-François James
- (Jamaica) Junior Flemmings
- (Jamaica) Andre Lewis
- (Jamaica) Jamar Loza
- (Jamaica) Sean McFarlane
- (Jamaica) Paul Wilson
- (Puerto Rico) Cooper Nugent
- (Puerto Rico) Reid Strain
- (Saint Kitts and Nevis) Keithroy Freeman
- (Saint Kitts and Nevis) Dahjal Kelly
- (Saint Kitts and Nevis) Vinceroy Nelson
- (Saint Kitts and Nevis) Glenroy Samuel
- (Saint Kitts and Nevis) Nile Walwyn
- (Saint Lucia) David Henry
- (Saint Vincent and the Grenadines) Brad Miguel
- (Saint Vincent and the Grenadines) Azinho Solomon
- (Trinidad and Tobago) Aikim Andrews

Own goal

- (Cuba) Yosel Piedra (playing against Jamaica)
- (Dominica) Malcolm Joseph (playing against Saint Vincent and the Grenadines)

Source: CONCACAF.com

== Qualified teams ==
The following eight teams qualified for the final tournament.

Team	Qualified as	Qualified on	Previous appearances in tournament^{1}
Canada	Automatic qualifier	N/A	7 (1984, 1992, 1996, 2000, 2004, 2008, 2012)
Mexico	Automatic qualifier	N/A	10 (**1964**, **1972**, **1976**, 1988, 1992, **1996**, 2000, **2004**, 2008, **2012**)
United States	Automatic qualifier / hosts	N/A	9 (1964, 1972, 1980, 1988, **1992**, 2000, 2004, 2008, 2012)
Panama	Central American Zone group A winner	15 August 2015	5 (1964, 2000, 2004, 2008, 2012)
Honduras	Central American Zone group B winner	13 August 2015	5 (1992, **2000**, 2004, **2008**, 2012)
Costa Rica	Central American Zone repechage playoff winner	23 August 2015	5 (1968, **1980**, **1984**, 1996, 2004)
Haiti	Caribbean Zone 1st place	14 August 2015	1 (2008)
Cuba	Caribbean Zone 2nd place	14 August 2015	4 (1976, 1984, 2008, 2012)

^{1} Bold indicates champion for that year. Italic indicates host for that year.
