= 2011 CONCACAF U-17 Championship qualification =

The 2011 CONCACAF U-17 Championship qualification tournaments took place in 2010 to qualify national teams for the 2011 CONCACAF U-17 Championship.

== Caribbean zone ==
The first round group winners advanced to a second group phase along with Cuba, Haiti, and group hosts Trinidad and Tobago and Dominican Republic. In the second round, the top two finishers in each group, along with the best-ranked third place side, qualified for the twelve-team 2011 CONCACAF U-17 Championship.

=== First round ===
==== Group A ====
Pos	Team	Pld	W	D	L	GF	GA	GD	Pts	Qualification
1	Bermuda	2	1	0	1	5	2	+3	3	Qualified to the Final round
2	Bahamas (H)	2	1	0	1	2	5	−3	3	

(H) Hosts

23 July 2010 Round 1	Bahamas	1–5	Bermuda	Nassau
18:00 (UTC−04:00)	Delancy 63'	Report	Chikosi 13', 31'; Wendell 65'; Minors 73'; Munroe 84' (o.g.)	Stadium: Thomas Robinson Stadium; Attendance: 700; Referee: Dave Peterkin (Jamaica)

25 July 2010 Round 2	Bahamas	1–0	Bermuda	Nassau
16:00 (UTC−04:00)	Antor 77'	Report		Stadium: Thomas Robinson Stadium; Attendance: 700; Referee: Dave Peterkin (Jamaica)

==== Group B ====
Pos	Team	Pld	W	D	L	GF	GA	GD	Pts	Qualification
1	Saint Kitts and Nevis	3	2	1	0	21	3	+18	7	Qualified to the Final round
2	Antigua and Barbuda (H)	3	2	1	0	17	3	+14	7	
3	Saint Martin	3	1	0	2	5	13	−8	3	
4	Anguilla	3	0	0	3	2	26	−24	0	

(H) Hosts

21 July 2010 Round 1	Saint Martin	4–1	Anguilla	St. John's
17:00 (UTC-04:00)	Miracle 6'; Questel 51', 59'; Cocks 90'	Report	Richardson 57'	Stadium: Antigua Recreation Ground; Attendance: 200; Referee: Trevor Taylor (Barbados)

21 July 2010 Round 1	Antigua and Barbuda	2–2	Saint Kitts and Nevis	St. John's
19:00 (UTC-04:00)	Constant 18'; Braithwaite 90'	Report	Mitchum 30'; Rogers 89'	Stadium: Antigua Recreation Ground; Attendance: 500; Referee: Valdin Legister (Jamaica)

23 July 2010 Round 2	Saint Kitts and Nevis	7–1	Saint Martin	St. John's
17:00 (UTC-04:00)	Claxton 26'; Hendrickson 27'; Samuel 36', 45'; Liburd 60'; Kelly 66'; Henry 79'	Report	Cocks 76'	Stadium: Antigua Recreation Ground; Attendance: 300; Referee: Valdin Legister (Jamaica)

23 July 2010 Round 2	Antigua and Barbuda	10–1	Anguilla	St. John's
19:00 (UTC-04:00)	Martin 3'; Constant 16', 30'; Thomas 21', 31', 37'; Braithwaite 22', 38'; T. Harriette 52', 90'	Report	Rogers 58'	Stadium: Antigua Recreation Ground; Attendance: 300; Referee: Ignatius Baptiste (Dominica)

25 July 2010 Round 3	Anguilla	0–12	Saint Kitts and Nevis	St. John's
17:00 (UTC-04:00)		Report	Samuel 1', 80'; Carty 9' (o.g.); Rogers 24', 60', 68', 85'; Phillip 29', 36'; Nisbett 48'; Henry 56', 76'	Stadium: Antigua Recreation Ground; Attendance: 300; Referee: Bryan Willett (Antigua and Barbuda)

25 July 2010 Round 3	Antigua and Barbuda	5–0	Saint Martin	St. John's
19:00 (UTC-04:00)	Thomas 57', 90'; T. Harriette 81'; Constant 83'; J. Harriette 90'	Report		Stadium: Antigua Recreation Ground; Attendance: 700; Referee: Ignatius Baptiste (Dominica)

==== Group C ====
Pos	Team	Pld	W	D	L	GF	GA	GD	Pts	Qualification
1	Guyana	3	2	1	0	14	2	+12	7	Qualified to the Final round
2	Netherlands Antilles	3	2	1	0	8	3	+5	7	
3	Aruba	3	1	0	2	2	11	−9	3	
4	Dominica (H)	3	0	0	3	2	10	−8	0	

(H) Hosts

20 July 2010 Round 1	Guyana	2–2	Netherlands Antilles	Roseau
(UTC−04:00)	Schultz 27'; Felomina 47' (o.g.)	Report	Martis 11'; Bartholomeus 13'	Stadium: Windsor Park; Attendance: 150; Referee: James Matthew (Australia)

20 July 2010 Round 1	Dominica	1–2	Aruba	Roseau
(UTC−04:00)	Reid 36'	Report	Vegas 29'; Kock 59'	Stadium: Windsor Park; Attendance: 275; Referee: Bryan Willett (Antigua and Barbuda)

22 July 2010 Round 2	Aruba	0–3	Netherlands Antilles	Roseau
15:00 (UTC−04:00)		Report	Martis 28'; Bartholomeus 51', 79'	Stadium: Windsor Park; Attendance: 250; Referee: Bryan Willett (Antigua and Barbuda)

22 July 2010 Round 2	Dominica	0–5	Guyana	Roseau
17:00 (UTC−04:00)		Report	Benjamin 3'; Leacock 27'; Garnett 29'; Lewis 78'; Carriere 89' (o.g.)	Stadium: Windsor Park; Attendance: 450; Referee: James Matthew (Australia)

24 July 2010 Round 3	Aruba	0–7	Guyana	Roseau
15:00 (UTC−04:00)		Report	Lewis 6'; Benjamin 42', 62'; Garnett 45'; Schultz 55'; Persaud 73', 85'	Stadium: Windsor Park; Attendance: 350; Referee: Bryan Willett (Antigua and Barbuda)

24 July 2010 Round 3	Dominica	1–3	Netherlands Antilles	Roseau
17:00 (UTC−04:00)	Prince 58'	Report	Martis 5'; Roch 25'; Vapor 71'	Stadium: Windsor Park; Attendance: 500; Referee: James Matthew (Saint Kitts and Nevis)

==== Group D ====
Pos	Team	Pld	W	D	L	GF	GA	GD	Pts	Qualification
1	Barbados	3	2	1	0	11	2	+9	7	Qualified to the Final round
2	Suriname (H)	3	1	2	0	11	3	+8	5	
3	Grenada	3	1	1	1	5	10	−5	4	
4	Saint Vincent and the Grenadines	3	0	0	3	3	15	−12	0	

(H) Hosts

20 July 2010 Round 1	Barbados	6–0	Grenada	Paramaribo
(UTC−03:00)	Adamson 13', 60'; Ward 32' (pen.); Chandler 37', 41'; Prescod 73'	Report		Stadium: André Kamperveen Stadion; Attendance: 100; Referee: Enrico Wijngaarde (Suriname)

20 July 2010 Round 1	Suriname	8–0	Saint Vincent and the Grenadines	Paramaribo
(UTC−03:00)	Apai 11', 53', 74'; Eduard 24', 85', 90'; Zandveld 76'; Juliaans 80'	Report		Stadium: André Kamperveen Stadion; Attendance: 500; Referee: Lee Davis (Trinidad and Tobago)

22 July 2010 Round 2	Barbados	3–0	Saint Vincent and the Grenadines	Paramaribo
17:00 (UTC−03:00)	Chandler 2', 61'; Adamson 78'	Report		Stadium: André Kamperveen Stadion; Attendance: 100; Referee: Lee Davis (Trinidad and Tobago)

22 July 2010 Round 2	Suriname	1–1	Grenada	Paramaribo
17:00 (UTC−03:00)	Steffens 48'	Report	Saint Paul 45'	Stadium: André Kamperveen Stadion; Referee: Javier Jauregui (Netherlands Antilles)

24 July 2010 Round 3	Grenada	4–3	Saint Vincent and the Grenadines	Paramaribo
17:00 (UTC−03:00)	John-Brown 9', 55'; Gannes 24'; Sampson 85'	Report	DeGrads 66', 70', 82'	Stadium: André Kamperveen Stadion; Attendance: 150; Referee: Lee Davis (Trinidad and Tobago)

24 July 2010 Round 3	Suriname	2–2	Barbados	Paramaribo
17:00 (UTC−03:00)	Apai 33'; Awinti 61'	Report	Prescod 63'; Chandler 67'	Stadium: André Kamperveen Stadion; Attendance: 1,500; Referee: Javier Jauregui (Netherlands Antilles)

=== Final round ===
==== Group E ====
Pos	Team	Pld	W	D	L	GF	GA	GD	Pts	Qualification
1	Trinidad and Tobago (H)	3	2	1	0	10	1	+9	7	Qualified to the 2011 CONCACAF U-17 Championship
2	Cuba	3	2	1	0	4	1	+3	7	Qualified to the 2011 CONCACAF U-17 Championship
3	Saint Kitts and Nevis	3	1	0	2	3	11	−8	3	
4	Bermuda	3	0	0	3	4	8	−4	0	

(H) Hosts

18 August 2010 Round 1	Bermuda	1–3	Cuba	Macoya
	Lewis 70'	Report	Luis 18'; Pérez 33', 44'	Stadium: Marvin Lee Stadium; Attendance: 500; Referee: Trevor Taylor (Barbados)

18 August 2010 Round 1	Trinidad and Tobago	8–0	Saint Kitts and Nevis	Macoya
	Pierre 8'; Samaroo 50'; Henry 61', 66', 73', 84', 90'; Sutton 77'	Report		Stadium: Marvin Lee Stadium; Attendance: 500; Referee: Enrico Wijngaarde (Suriname)

20 August 2010 Round 2	Bermuda	2–3	Saint Kitts and Nevis	Macoya
	Hill 3'; Lewis 90+2'	Report	Nisbett 21'; Phillip 45' (pen.); Samuel 67'	Stadium: Marvin Lee Stadium; Attendance: 500; Referee: Ignatius Baptiste (Dominica)

20 August 2010 Round 2	Trinidad and Tobago	0–0	Cuba	Macoya
		Report		Stadium: Marvin Lee Stadium; Attendance: 500; Referee: Kevin Morrison (Jamaica)

22 August 2010 Round 3	Cuba	1–0	Saint Kitts and Nevis	Macoya
	Pérez 58'	Report		Stadium: Marvin Lee Stadium; Attendance: 500; Referee: Kevin Morrison (Jamaica)

22 August 2010 Round 3	Trinidad and Tobago	2–1	Bermuda	Macoya
	Williams 22', 39'	Report	Lewis 48'	Stadium: Marvin Lee Stadium; Attendance: 500; Referee: Enrico Wijngaarde (Suriname)

==== Group F ====
Pos	Team	Pld	W	D	L	GF	GA	GD	Pts	Qualification
1	Haiti	3	2	0	1	14	2	+12	6	Qualified to the 2011 CONCACAF U-17 Championship
2	Barbados	3	2	0	1	8	3	+5	6	Qualified to the 2011 CONCACAF U-17 Championship
3	Dominican Republic (H)	3	2	0	1	2	6	−4	6	
4	Guyana	3	0	0	3	1	14	−13	0	

(H) Hosts

Group F was originally scheduled to be played in Jamaica, but the matches were postponed. It was later announced that the Dominican Republic would host the group.

8 December 2010 Round 1	Haiti	1–2	Barbados	San Cristóbal
(UTC−04:00)	Georges 1'	Report	Chandler 17'; Pompée 84' (o.g.)	Stadium: Estadio Panamericano; Attendance: 120; Referee: Kenville Holder (Cayman Islands)

8 December 2010 Round 1	Dominican Republic	1–0	Guyana	San Cristóbal
(UTC−04:00)	Ramírez 10'	Report		Stadium: Estadio Panamericano; Attendance: 120; Referee: Kevin Morrison (Jamaica)

10 December 2010 Round 2	Guyana	0–7	Haiti	San Cristóbal
(UTC−04:00)		Report	Saint-Jean 49'; Gateau 51'; Chéry 55', 76', 77'; Nau 90'; Georges 90'	Stadium: Estadio Panamericano; Attendance: 200; Referee: Javier Santos (Puerto Rico)

10 December 2010 Round 2	Dominican Republic	1–0	Barbados	San Cristóbal
(UTC−04:00)	Martínez 35'	Report		Stadium: Estadio Panamericano; Attendance: 200; Referee: Marcos Brea (Cuba)

12 December 2010 Round 3	Guyana	1–6	Barbados	San Cristóbal
(UTC−04:00)	Garnett 79'	Report	Maynard 13'; Chandler 34', 84'; Adamson 45'; Stevenson 70'; Williams 87'	Stadium: Estadio Panamericano; Attendance: 500; Referee: Kevin Morrison (Jamaica)

12 December 2010 Round 3	Dominican Republic	0–6	Haiti	San Cristóbal
(UTC−04:00)		Report	Chéry 14', 33', 68'; Gedeon 43'; Georges 52', 62'	Stadium: Estadio Panamericano; Attendance: 500; Referee: Kenville Holder (Cayman Islands)

== Central American zone ==
=== Group A ===
Pos	Team	Pld	W	D	L	GF	GA	GD	Pts	Qualification
1	Costa Rica (H)	2	2	0	0	10	1	+9	6	Qualified to 2011 CONCACAF U-17 Championship
2	El Salvador	2	1	0	1	4	4	0	3	Qualified to 2011 CONCACAF U-17 Championship
3	Nicaragua	2	0	0	2	2	11	−9	0	Qualified to playoff

(H) Hosts

26 October 2010	Costa Rica	8–0	Nicaragua	Guápiles
(UTC−06:00)	Scott 16'; Salas 55', 62', 65', 68'; Ruiz 81'; Conejo 87'; Leiva 90'	Report		Stadium: Estadio Ebal Rodríguez; Referee: Jafeth Perea (Panama)

28 October 2010	El Salvador	3–2	Nicaragua	Guápiles
(UTC−06:00)	Landaverde 18'; Peña 21'; Zelaya 36'	Report	Peralta 83'; Chavarría 87'	Stadium: Estadio Ebal Rodríguez; Attendance: 100; Referee: Oscar Reyna (Guatemala)

30 October 2010	Costa Rica	2–1	El Salvador	Guápiles
(UTC−06:00)	Scott 11'; Quirós 72'	Report	Zeyala 20'	Stadium: Estadio Ebal Rodríguez; Attendance: 864; Referee: José Pineda (Honduras)

=== Group B ===
Pos	Team	Pld	W	D	L	GF	GA	GD	Pts	Qualification
1	Honduras	2	1	0	1	2	1	+1	3	Qualified to 2011 CONCACAF U-17 Championship
2	Panama	2	1	0	1	1	1	0	3	Qualified to 2011 CONCACAF U-17 Championship
3	Guatemala (H)	2	1	0	1	1	2	−1	3	Qualified to playoff

(H) Hosts

10 November 2010	Honduras	0–1	Panama	Antigua
		Report	Browne 9'	Stadium: Estadio Pensativo; Attendance: 227; Referee: Franklin Jarquín (Nicaragua)

12 November 2010	Guatemala	1–0	Panama	Antigua
	Fransisco 68' (o.g.)	Report		Stadium: Estadio Pensativo; Attendance: 1,037; Referee: Jeffrey Solís (Costa Rica)

14 November 2010	Guatemala	0–2	Honduras	Antigua
		Report	Moncada 22'; Mejía 77'	Stadium: Estadio Pensativo; Attendance: 1,981; Referee: Miguel Medrano (El Salvador)

=== Playoff ===
20 November 2010 First leg	Nicaragua	0–3	Guatemala	Managua
		Report	Barrientos 24'; Garcia 61', 77'	Stadium: Estadio Nacional de Fútbol; Attendance: 200; Referee: Marlon Mejía (El Salvador)

27 November 2010 Second leg	Guatemala	1–0 (4–0 agg.)	Nicaragua	Guatemala City
	Barrientos 24'	Report		Stadium: Estadio Mateo Flores; Attendance: 3,325; Referee: José Pineda (Honduras)

- Guatemala advanced to 2011 CONCACAF U-17 Championship.
