= 2013 CONCACAF U-20 Championship qualifying =

The qualifying stage of the 2013 CONCACAF U-20 Championship competition is handled by two regional bodies; the Caribbean Football Union (Caribbean zone) and the UNCAF (Central American zone).

Four teams from Central America and five from the Caribbean will qualify to the 2013 CONCACAF U-20 Championship to be played in Mexico. In addition to hosts Mexico, the United States and Canada will automatically qualify for the competition.

== Caribbean zone ==
The qualification for the Caribbean Nations is organised by the Caribbean Football Union. In total five nations will qualify from the Caribbean zone for the 2013 CONCACAF U-20 Championship.

=== First round ===
The first round took place during 23–31 July 2012.

==== Group A ====
The group was hosted in Antigua and Barbuda and games were played the 8 to 12 August 2012. In addition to Antigua and Barbuda, the group will include Curaçao, Grenada and Dominica. Grenada were originally scheduled to host the group's games but the Grenadian FA could not afford it.

| Team | Pld | W | D | L | GF | GA | GD | Pts |
|---|---|---|---|---|---|---|---|---|
| Curaçao | 3 | 2 | 1 | 0 | 11 | 5 | +6 | 7 |
| Antigua and Barbuda | 3 | 2 | 1 | 0 | 9 | 4 | +5 | 7 |
| Grenada | 3 | 1 | 0 | 2 | 5 | 6 | −1 | 3 |
| Dominica | 3 | 0 | 0 | 3 | 2 | 12 | −10 | 0 |

8 August 2012
17:00

| Curaçao | 3 – 1 | Grenada |
|---|---|---|
| N. Martina 27'; Maria 30' van Eijman 35' | report | Pierre 76' |

Sir Vivian Richards Stadium, North Sound
Attendance: 30
Referee: Enrico Wijngaarde (Suriname)
8 August 2012
19:00

| Antigua and Barbuda | 4 – 0 | Dominica |
|---|---|---|
| Kirwan 16'; Constant 48', 49'; Harriette 79' | report |

Sir Vivian Richards Stadium, North Sound
Attendance: 135
Referee: Neal Brizan (Trinidad and Tobago)
10 August 2012
17:00

| Dominica | 1 – 5 | Curaçao |
|---|---|---|
| Williams 17' | report | Martis 2'; Martina 45'; Kierindongo 63'; J. Martina 68', 80' |

Sir Vivian Richards Stadium, North Sound
Attendance: 200
Referee: Jermain Elskamp (Suriname)
11 August 2012
19:00

| Antigua and Barbuda | 2 – 1 | Grenada |
|---|---|---|
| Braithwaite 83'; Thomas 89' | report | Alexander 56' |

Sir Vivian Richards Stadium, North Sound
Attendance: 200
Referee: Collingham Delves (Saint Vincent and the Grenadines)
12 August 2012
17:00

| Grenada | 3 – 1 | Dominica |
|---|---|---|
| Marshall 32'; Alexander 40'; Gannes 83' | report | Charles 77' |

Sir Vivian Richards Stadium, North Sound
Attendance: 300
Referee: Collingham Delves (Saint Vincent and the Grenadines)
13 August 2012
19:00

| Antigua and Barbuda | 3 – 3 | Curaçao |
|---|---|---|
| Constant 31', 35', 60' | report | Maria 10', 58'; Kierindongo 66' |

Sir Vivian Richards Stadium, North Sound
Attendance: 900
Referee: Enrico Wijngaarde (Suriname)

==== Group B ====
Hosted in Dominican Republic.

| Team | Pld | W | D | L | GF | GA | GD | Pts |
|---|---|---|---|---|---|---|---|---|
| Cuba | 3 | 2 | 1 | 0 | 10 | 1 | +9 | 7 |
| Dominican Republic | 3 | 1 | 2 | 0 | 6 | 1 | +5 | 5 |
| Saint Kitts and Nevis | 3 | 1 | 1 | 1 | 3 | 6 | −3 | 4 |
| Aruba | 3 | 0 | 0 | 3 | 4 | 15 | −11 | 0 |

26 July 2012
14:00

| Cuba | 6 – 1 | Aruba |
|---|---|---|
| Perez 38'; Wilson 53', 78'; P. Hernández 79'; Reyes 87', 90' | report | Richardson 13' |

Estadio Panamericano, San Cristóbal
Attendance: 150
Referee: Neal Brizan (Trinidad and Tobago)
26 July 2012
16:00

| Dominican Republic | 0 – 0 | Saint Kitts and Nevis |
|---|---|---|
| | report |

Estadio Panamericano, San Cristóbal
Attendance: 500
Referee: Javier Santos (Puerto Rico)
28 July 2012
14:00

| Saint Kitts and Nevis | 0 – 4 | Cuba |
|---|---|---|
| | report | A. Hernández 3'; Reyes 50'; Perez 78'; Diz 90' |

Estadio Panamericano, San Cristóbal
Attendance: 350
Referee: Javier Jauregui (Curaçao)
28 July 2012
16:00

| Dominican Republic | 6 – 1 | Aruba |
|---|---|---|
| Quezada 10', 39'; Ramirez 20', 45'; Espinal 30'; García 69' | report | Fingal 80' |

Estadio Panamericano, San Cristóbal
Attendance: 600
Referee: Alain Georges (Haiti)
30 July 2012
14:00

| Aruba | 2 – 3 | Saint Kitts and Nevis |
|---|---|---|
| Bolivar 68'; Alexander 73' | report | Harris 35'; Flemming 55'; Liburd 87' |

Estadio Panamericano, San Cristóbal
Attendance: 150
Referee: Javier Santos (Puerto Rico)
30 July 2012
16:00

| Dominican Republic | 0 – 0 | Cuba |
|---|---|---|
| | report |

Estadio Panamericano, San Cristóbal
Attendance: 1,050
Referee: Alain Georges (Haiti)

==== Group C ====
Hosted in Puerto Rico

| Team | Pld | W | D | L | GF | GA | GD | Pts |
|---|---|---|---|---|---|---|---|---|
| Haiti | 3 | 2 | 1 | 0 | 5 | 0 | +5 | 7 |
| Puerto Rico | 3 | 2 | 1 | 0 | 4 | 0 | +4 | 7 |
| Bermuda | 3 | 1 | 0 | 2 | 1 | 5 | −4 | 3 |
| Barbados | 3 | 0 | 0 | 3 | 0 | 5 | −5 | 0 |

25 July 2012
18:00

| Bermuda | 0 – 3 | Haiti |
|---|---|---|
| | report | Johnley 29'; Dumy 30', 60' |

Bayamón FC Soccer Complex, Bayamón
Attendance: 50
Referee: Raymond Bogle (Jamaica)
25 July 2012
21:00

| Puerto Rico | 2 – 0 | Barbados |
|---|---|---|
| Strain 63'; Coca 82' | report |

Mayagüez Athletics Stadium, Mayagüez
Attendance: 1,000
Referee: Courtney Campbell (Jamaica)
27 July 2012
18:00

| Haiti | 2 – 0 | Barbados |
|---|---|---|
| Ismaël 9'; Sheelove 62' | report |

Mayagüez Athletics Stadium, Mayagüez
Attendance: 100
Referee: Dwight Royal (Jamaica)
27 July 2012
21:00

| Puerto Rico | 2 – 0 | Bermuda |
|---|---|---|
| Strain 49'; Marrero 63' | report |

Mayagüez Athletics Stadium, Mayagüez
Attendance: 700
Referee: Kevin Morrisson (Jamaica)
29 July 2012
18:00

| Barbados | 0 – 2 | Bermuda |
|---|---|---|
| | report | Simmons 85'; Wendell 90' |

Mayagüez Athletics Stadium, Mayagüez
Attendance: 20
Referee: Kevin Morrisson (Jamaica)
29 July 2012
21:00

| Puerto Rico | 0 – 0 | Haiti |
|---|---|---|
| | report |

Mayagüez Athletics Stadium, Mayagüez
Attendance: 2,000
Referee: Raymond Bogle (Jamaica)

==== Group D ====
Hosted in St. Vincent and the Grenadines

| Team | Pld | W | D | L | GF | GA | GD | Pts |
|---|---|---|---|---|---|---|---|---|
| Suriname | 3 | 2 | 0 | 1 | 5 | 2 | +3 | 6 |
| Trinidad and Tobago | 3 | 2 | 0 | 1 | 5 | 4 | +1 | 6 |
| Guyana | 3 | 1 | 0 | 2 | 4 | 6 | −2 | 3 |
| Saint Vincent and the Grenadines | 3 | 1 | 0 | 2 | 3 | 5 | −2 | 3 |

8 August 2012
17:30

| Trinidad and Tobago | 2 – 1 | Guyana |
|---|---|---|
| Williams 9'; Noel 52' | Report | Bobb 41' |

Victoria Park, Kingstown
Attendance: 300
Referee: Adrian Skeete (Barbados)
8 August 2012
19:30

| Saint Vincent and the Grenadines | 0 – 1 | Suriname |
|---|---|---|
| | Report | Apai 45' |

Victoria Park, Kingstown
Attendance: 400
Referee: Bryan Willett (Antigua and Barbuda)
10 August 2012
17:30

| Suriname | 3 – 0 | Trinidad and Tobago |
|---|---|---|
| Eduard 33'; Apai 49', 77' | Report |

Victoria Park, Kingstown
Attendance: 300
Referee: Leo Clarke (Saint Lucia)
10 August 2012
19:30

| Saint Vincent and the Grenadines | 3 – 1 | Guyana |
|---|---|---|
| John 32' hoyte 43'; Toppin 83' | Report | Smartt 69' |

Victoria Park, Kingstown
Attendance: 400
Referee: Valman Bedeau (Grenada)
12 August 2012
17:30

| Guyana | 2 – 1 | Suriname |
|---|---|---|
| Booker 60'; Wilson 84' | Report | Darson 18' |

Victoria Park, Kingstown
Attendance: 400
Referee: Adrian Skeete (Barbados)
12 August 2012
19:30

| Saint Vincent and the Grenadines | 0 – 3 | Trinidad and Tobago |
|---|---|---|
| | Report | Williams 6'; West 39'; Noel 44' |

Victoria Park, Kingstown
Attendance: 2,000
Referee: Valman Bedeau (Grenada)

==== Best three overall second place from first round ====
| Team | Pld | W | D | L | GF | GA | GD | Pts |
|---|---|---|---|---|---|---|---|---|
| Antigua and Barbuda | 3 | 2 | 1 | 0 | 9 | 4 | +5 | 7 |
| Puerto Rico | 3 | 2 | 1 | 0 | 4 | 0 | +4 | 7 |
| Trinidad and Tobago | 3 | 2 | 0 | 1 | 5 | 4 | +1 | 6 |
| Dominican Republic | 3 | 1 | 2 | 0 | 6 | 1 | +5 | 5 |

=== Final Round ===
The final round took place during 3–11 November 2012 in Jamaica. This second qualifying round has been referred to as the Caribbean Under 20 Finals by CONCACAF.

Five of the eight teams who reached this round qualified for the 2013 CONCACAF U-20 Championship.

==== Group A ====
Hosted in Kingston, Jamaica

| Team | Pld | W | D | L | GF | GA | GD | Pts |
|---|---|---|---|---|---|---|---|---|
| Haiti | 3 | 2 | 1 | 0 | 5 | 2 | +3 | 7 |
| Puerto Rico | 3 | 1 | 1 | 1 | 3 | 4 | –1 | 4 |
| Curaçao | 3 | 1 | 0 | 2 | 3 | 4 | –1 | 3 |
| Trinidad and Tobago | 3 | 1 | 0 | 2 | 2 | 3 | –1 | 3 |

5 November 2012
15:00

| Trinidad and Tobago | 2 – 0 | Puerto Rico |
|---|---|---|
| Henry 32'; Nesbitt 90' | Report |

Waterhouse Stadium, Kingston
Attendance: 250
Referee: Kevin Morrison (Jamaica)
5 November 2012
17:00

| Haiti | 2 –1 | Curaçao |
|---|---|---|
| Johnley 13'; Ismaël 51' | Report | Fecunda 10' |

Waterhouse Stadium, Kingston
Attendance: 250
Referee: Marcos Brea (Cuba)
7 November 2012
15:00

| Puerto Rico | 2 – 1 | Curaçao |
|---|---|---|
| Marrero 61' (pen.); Strain 65' | Report | Maria 17' |

Waterhouse Stadium, Kingston
Attendance: 200
Referee: Jermain Elskamp (Suriname)
7 November 2012
17:00

| Haiti | 2 – 0 | Trinidad and Tobago |
|---|---|---|
| Luckner 31'; Pompée 47' | Report |

Waterhouse Stadium, Kingston
Attendance: 300
Referee: Sherwin Johnson (Guyana)
9 November 2012
15:00

| Curaçao | 1 – 0 | Trinidad and Tobago |
|---|---|---|
| Alberto 10' | Report |

Waterhouse Stadium, Kingston
Attendance: 200
Referee: Marcos Brea (Cuba)
9 November 2012
17:00

| Puerto Rico | 1 – 1 | Haiti |
|---|---|---|
| Abrams 38' | Report | Johnley 86' |

Waterhouse Stadium, Kingston
Attendance: 300
Referee: Sherwin Johnson (Guyana)

==== Group B ====
| Team | Pld | W | D | L | GF | GA | GD | Pts |
|---|---|---|---|---|---|---|---|---|
| Jamaica | 3 | 2 | 1 | 0 | 4 | 0 | +4 | 7 |
| Cuba | 3 | 2 | 1 | 0 | 4 | 1 | +3 | 7 |
| Antigua and Barbuda | 3 | 1 | 0 | 2 | 3 | 4 | –1 | 3 |
| Suriname | 3 | 0 | 0 | 3 | 2 | 8 | –6 | 0 |

6 November 2012
11:00

| Cuba | 2 – 1 | Suriname |
|---|---|---|
| Hernández 24', 45' | Report | Darson 46' |

Anthony Spaulding Sports Complex, Kingston
Attendance: 200
Referee: Wilson Da Costa (Bahamas)
6 November 2012
13:00

| Jamaica | 1 – 0 | Antigua and Barbuda |
|---|---|---|
| Boothe 42' | Report |

Anthony Spaulding Sports Complex, Kingston
Attendance: 375
Referee: Javier Santos (Puerto Rico)
8 November 2012
11:00

| Antigua and Barbuda | 0 – 2 | Cuba |
|---|---|---|
| | Report | Vaquero 81'; Santa Cruz 90' |

Anthony Spaulding Sports Complex, Kingston
Attendance: 150
Referee: Leo Clarke (Saint Lucia)
8 November 2012
13:00

| Jamaica | 3 – 0 | Suriname |
|---|---|---|
| McFarlane 44'; Barnes 65'; Manning 90' | Report |

Anthony Spaulding Sports Complex, Kingston
Attendance: 400
Referee: Sandy Vásquez (Dominican Republic)
10 November 2012
11:00

| Suriname | 1 – 3 | Antigua and Barbuda |
|---|---|---|
| Bodji 6' | Report | Martin 48'; Harriette 50'; McDonald 56' |

Anthony Spaulding Sports Complex, Kingston
Attendance: 150
Referee: Wilson Da Costa (Bahamas)
10 November 2012
15:00

| Jamaica | 0 – 0 | Cuba |
|---|---|---|
| | Report |

Anthony Spaulding Sports Complex, Kingston
Attendance: 1,200
Referee: Javier Santos (Puerto Rico)

==== Best runner-up from Final round ====
| Team | Pld | W | D | L | GF | GA | GD | Pts |
|---|---|---|---|---|---|---|---|---|
| Curaçao | 3 | 1 | 0 | 2 | 3 | 4 | –1 | 3 |
| Antigua and Barbuda | 3 | 1 | 0 | 2 | 3 | 4 | –1 | 3 |

As Curaçao also Antigua and Barbuda both had equal goal difference and points, Damien Hughes of the CFU tossed a coin to decide which team would participate in the Championship during half-time of the final Jamaica vs Cuba game in Group B. Curaçao won the toss.

== Central American zone ==
2013 UNCAF U20 Qualifying
Tournament details
- Host countries: Guatemala; Honduras
- Dates: 17–29 July 2012
- Teams: 6 (from 6 associations)

The qualification for the Central American Nations is organised by UNCAF. The top two nations in each group will qualify for the 2013 CONCACAF U-20 Championship. Belize chose not to participate. The schedule was published on 25 June 2012.

Key to colours in group tables
| Top 2 teams in each group advanced to the CONCACAF U-20 Championship |

=== Group A ===
This group is to be hosted in Honduras and games are scheduled for 17 to 21 July 2012. In addition to Honduras, the group will include Costa Rica and Nicaragua.

| Team | Pld | W | D | L | GF | GA | GD | Pts |
|---|---|---|---|---|---|---|---|---|
| Costa Rica | 2 | 1 | 1 | 0 | 3 | 2 | +1 | 4 |
| Nicaragua | 2 | 1 | 0 | 1 | 3 | 3 | 0 | 3 |
| Honduras | 2 | 0 | 1 | 1 | 0 | 1 | −1 | 1 |

17 July 2012
19:00

| Costa Rica | 3 – 2 | Nicaragua |
|---|---|---|
| Flores 59'; Sosa 68' 90' | Report | Chavarría 60' 76' |

Estadio Olímpico Metropolitano, San Pedro Sula
Attendance: 150
Referee: Rolando Vidal (PAN)
19 July 2012
19:00

| Honduras | 0 – 0 | Costa Rica |
|---|---|---|
| | Report |

Estadio Francisco Morazán, San Pedro Sula
Attendance: 1,500
Referee: Marlon Mejía (SLV)
21 July 2012
19:00

| Honduras | 0 – 1 | Nicaragua |
|---|---|---|
| | Report | Chavarría 24' |

Estadio Francisco Morazán, San Pedro Sula
Attendance: 1,000
Referee: Juan Guerra (GUA)

=== Group B ===
This group is to be hosted in Guatemala and games are scheduled for 25 to 29 July 2012. In addition to Guatemala, the group will include El Salvador and Panama.

| Team | Pld | W | D | L | GF | GA | GD | Pts |
|---|---|---|---|---|---|---|---|---|
| El Salvador | 2 | 1 | 0 | 1 | 4 | 4 | 0 | 3 |
| Panama | 2 | 1 | 0 | 1 | 4 | 4 | 0 | 3 |
| Guatemala | 2 | 1 | 0 | 1 | 1 | 1 | 0 | 3 |

25 July 2012
12:00

| Guatemala | 1 – 0 | El Salvador |
|---|---|---|
| Ruiz 43' | Report |

Estadio Israel Barrios, Coatepeque, Guatemala
Attendance: 3,853
Referee: Jeffrey Solís (CRC)
27 July 2012
12:00

| El Salvador | 4 – 3 | Panama |
|---|---|---|
| Peña 12'; Henríquez 27' 59'; González 45' | Report | Arroyo 6'; Muñoz 68'; Stephens 73' |

Estadio Israel Barrios, Coatepeque, Guatemala
Attendance: 359
Referee: Armando Castro (HON)
29 July 2012
12:00

| Guatemala | 0 – 1 | Panama |
|---|---|---|
| | Report |

Estadio Israel Barrios, Coatepeque, Guatemala
Referee: Hector Rodriguez (HON)

Eighteen players were banned for a combined 94 games for their actions following the Panama's 1–0 win over Guatemala.

| Player | Number of international games suspended for |
|---|---|
| (Guatemala) Alvaro Tuna; (Guatemala) Junior Andrade; (Guatemala) Albert Barrientos | 12 |
| (Panama) Jairo Jimenez; (Panama) Joseph Vargas; (Panama) Richard Peralta; (Panama) Rigoberto Esquivel; (Panama) Miguel Camargo; (Panama) Luis Fraiz; (Panama) Jorman Aguilar; (Guatemala) Jose Pinto | 6 |
| (Guatemala) Mynor Padilla; (Guatemala) Franklin Garcia; (Panama) Abdiel Arroyode | 2 |
| (Guatemala) Jose Abreu; (Panama) Alfredo Stephens; (Panama) Pedro Jeanine; (Panama) Amet Ramirez | 1 |
