= 2015 CONCACAF Men's Olympic Qualifying Championship squads =

The 2015 CONCACAF Men's Olympic Qualifying Championship was an international football tournament that was held in the United States from 1 and 13 October 2015. The eight national teams involved in the tournament were required to register a squad of twenty players, three of whom had to be goalkeepers.

The final lists were published by CONCACAF on 25 September 2015.

All registered players had to have been born on or after 1 January 1993 (Regulations Article 13). The age listed for each player is on 1 October 2015, the first day of the tournament. A flag is included for coaches who are of a different nationality than their own national team. Players marked in bold have been capped at full international level.

== Group A ==
=== Canada ===
Head coach: (Spain) Benito Floro

No.	Pos.	Player	Date of birth (age)	Club
1	GK	Maxime Crépeau	April 11, 1994 (aged 21)	(Canadian Soccer Association) Montreal Impact
2	DF	Jonathan Grant	October 15, 1993 (aged 21)	(Canadian Soccer Association) FC Montreal
3	DF	Giuliano Frano	May 16, 1993 (aged 22)	(United States Soccer Federation) Seattle Sounders FC 2
4	DF	Jackson Farmer	May 3, 1995 (aged 20)	(Canadian Soccer Association) Whitecaps FC 2
5	DF	Luca Gasparotto	August 5, 1995 (aged 20)	(Scottish Football Association) Greenock Morton
6	MF	Chris Mannella	June 7, 1994 (aged 21)	(Canadian Soccer Association) Toronto FC
7	MF	Mauro Eustáquio	February 18, 1993 (aged 22)	(Canadian Soccer Association) Ottawa Fury FC
8	MF	Jay Chapman	January 1, 1994 (aged 21)	(Canadian Soccer Association) Toronto FC
9	FW	Anthony Jackson-Hamel	August 2, 1993 (aged 22)	(Canadian Soccer Association) Montreal Impact
10	FW	Caleb Clarke	June 23, 1993 (aged 22)	(Canadian Soccer Association) Vancouver Whitecaps FC
11	MF	Jérémy Gagnon-Laparé	March 9, 1995 (aged 20)	(Canadian Soccer Association) Montreal Impact
12	GK	Quillan Roberts	September 13, 1994 (aged 21)	(Canadian Soccer Association) Toronto FC
13	MF	Michael Petrasso	July 9, 1995 (aged 20)	(The Football Association) Queens Park Rangers
14	MF	Samuel Piette	November 12, 1994 (aged 20)	(Royal Spanish Football Federation) Racing de Ferrol
15	FW	Ben Fisk	February 4, 1993 (aged 22)	(Royal Spanish Football Federation) Deportivo B
16	MF	Molham Babouli	February 1, 1993 (aged 22)	(Canadian Soccer Association) Toronto FC II
17	MF	Hanson Boakai	October 28, 1996 (aged 18)	(Canadian Soccer Association) FC Edmonton
18	GK	Ricky Gomes	June 19, 1993 (aged 22)	(Portuguese Football Federation) SC Mirandela
19	DF	Skylar Thomas	July 27, 1993 (aged 22)	(Canadian Soccer Association) Toronto FC II
20	MF	Dylan Carreiro	January 20, 1995 (aged 20)	(Scottish Football Association) Dundee

=== Cuba ===
Head coach: (Cuba) Raul Gonzalez Triana

No.	Pos.	Player	Date of birth (age)	Club
1	GK	Sandy Sánchez	May 24, 1994 (aged 21)	(Football Association of Cuba) FC Las Tunas
2	DF	Andy Vaquero	March 17, 1994 (aged 21)	(Football Association of Cuba) FC La Habana
4	MF	Yolexis Leiraldo Collado Mora	February 21, 1994 (aged 21)	(Football Association of Cuba) FC La Habana
6	DF	Yosel Piedra	March 27, 1994 (aged 21)	(Football Association of Cuba) FC Villa Clara
6	MF	Arichel Hernández	September 20, 1993 (aged 22)	(Football Association of Cuba) FC Villa Clara
9	FW	Maykel Reyes	March 4, 1993 (aged 22)	(Football Association of Cuba) FC Pinar del Río
10	FW	Héctor Javier Morales Sánchez	January 19, 1993 (aged 22)	(Football Association of Cuba) FC La Habana
12	GK	Elier Pozo Ballona	January 28, 1995 (aged 20)	(Football Association of Cuba) FC Pinar del Río
15	DF	Adrián Diz	March 4, 1994 (aged 21)	(Football Association of Cuba) FC La Habana
16	MF	Daniel Luis Sáez	May 11, 1994 (aged 21)	(Football Association of Cuba) FC La Habana
18	DF	Abel Martínez	January 3, 1993 (aged 22)	(Football Association of Cuba) FC La Habana
19	MF	David Urgelles Soler	April 24, 1995 (aged 20)	(Football Association of Cuba) FC Guantanamo
20	MF	Osmany Capote Gallardo	March 11, 1995 (aged 20)	(Football Association of Cuba) FC Villa Clara
21	GK	Delvis Lumpuy Quintanilla	February 8, 1995 (aged 20)	(Football Association of Cuba) FC Villa Clara

The following players defected during the tournament:

No.	Pos.	Player	Date of birth (age)	Club
3	MF	Emmanuel Labrada (Note: Defected prior to Cuba's opening game against Panama.)	January 19, 1994 (aged 21)	(Football Association of Cuba) CF Granma
5	DF	Brian Rosales (Note: Defected following Cuba's opening game against Panama.)	March 7, 1995 (aged 20)	(Football Association of Cuba) FC Matanzas
8	FW	Frank López García (Note: Defected prior to Cuba's opening game against Panama.)	February 25, 1995 (aged 20)	(Football Association of Cuba) FC Cienfuegos
11	MF	Dairon Pérez (Note: Defected prior to Cuba's opening game against Panama.)	January 7, 1994 (aged 21)	(Football Association of Cuba) FC La Habana
14	DF	Yendry Torres (Note: Defected prior to Cuba's opening game against Panama.)	October 5, 1995 (aged 19)	(Football Association of Cuba) FC Cienfuegos
17	MF	Pedro Yandy Anderson Hernández (Note: Defected prior to Cuba's game against Canada.)	November 9, 1993 (aged 21)	(Football Association of Cuba) FC Pinar del Río

=== Panama ===
Head coach: (Argentina) Leonardo Pipino

No.	Pos.	Player	Date of birth (age)	Club
1	GK	Elieser Powell	April 21, 1994 (aged 21)	(Panamanian Football Federation) Chorrillo FC
2	DF	Chin Hormechea	May 11, 1996 (aged 19)	(Panamanian Football Federation) Arabe Unido
3	DF	Kevin Galvan	March 10, 1996 (aged 19)	(Panamanian Football Federation) Sporting San Miguelito
4	DF	Michael Amir Murillo	February 11, 1996 (aged 19)	(Panamanian Football Federation) San Francisco FC
5	MF	Pedro Jeanine	September 4, 1993 (aged 22)	(Panamanian Football Federation) San Francisco FC
6	DF	Fidel Escobar	January 9, 1995 (aged 20)	(Panamanian Football Federation) Sporting San Miguelito
7	MF	Jesus Gonzalez	July 25, 1996 (aged 19)	(Panamanian Football Federation) Sporting San Miguelito
8	MF	Jhamal Rodriguez	January 28, 1995 (aged 20)	(Panamanian Football Federation) Chorrillo FC
9	FW	Abdiel Arroyo	December 13, 1993 (aged 21)	(Panamanian Football Federation) Arabe Unido
10	MF	Miguel Camargo	May 9, 1993 (aged 22)	(Panamanian Football Federation) Chorrillo FC
11	MF	Edgar Barcenas	October 23, 1993 (aged 21)	(Panamanian Football Federation) Arabe Unido
12	GK	Jaime De Garcia	May 11, 1996 (aged 19)	(Panamanian Football Federation) Tauro FC
13	DF	Jesus Araya	January 3, 1996 (aged 19)	(Panamanian Football Federation) Tauro FC
14	DF	Roberto Chen	May 24, 1994 (aged 21)	(Royal Spanish Football Federation) Real Balompedica Linense
15	MF	Francisco Narbon	February 11, 1995 (aged 20)	(Panamanian Football Federation) Unattached
16	MF	Justin Simons	September 19, 1997 (aged 18)	(Panamanian Football Federation) San Francisco FC
17	FW	Carlos Small	March 13, 1995 (aged 20)	(Panamanian Football Federation) Sporting San Miguelito
18	MF	Josiel Nuñez	January 29, 1993 (aged 22)	(Panamanian Football Federation) C.D. Plaza Amador
19	FW	Jorman Aguilar	September 11, 1994 (aged 21)	(Panamanian Football Federation) Tauro FC
20	GK	Orlando Mosquera	December 25, 1994 (aged 20)	(Panamanian Football Federation) Sporting San Miguelito

=== United States ===
Head coach: (Austria) Andi Herzog

No.	Pos.	Player	Date of birth (age)	Club
1	GK	Zack Steffen	April 2, 1995 (aged 20)	(German Football Association) SC Freiburg
2	DF	Boyd Okwuonu	February 23, 1993 (aged 22)	(United States Soccer Federation) Real Salt Lake
3	DF	Matt Miazga	July 19, 1995 (aged 20)	(United States Soccer Federation) New York Red Bulls
4	DF	Cameron Carter-Vickers	December 31, 1997 (aged 17)	(The Football Association) Tottenham Hotspur
5	DF	Will Packwood	May 21, 1993 (aged 22)	Unattached
6	MF	Wil Trapp	January 15, 1993 (aged 22)	(United States Soccer Federation) Columbus Crew SC
7	DF	Dillon Serna	March 25, 1994 (aged 21)	(United States Soccer Federation) Colorado Rapids
8	MF	Emerson Hyndman	April 9, 1996 (aged 19)	(The Football Association) Fulham
9	FW	Jordan Morris	October 26, 1994 (aged 20)	(United States Soccer Federation) Stanford
10	MF	Luis Gil	November 14, 1993 (aged 21)	(United States Soccer Federation) Real Salt Lake
11	FW	Alonso Hernández	March 1, 1994 (aged 21)	(Mexican Football Federation) Juárez
12	GK	Ethan Horvath	June 9, 1995 (aged 20)	(Norwegian Football Federation) Molde FK
13	MF	Matt Polster	June 8, 1993 (aged 22)	(United States Soccer Federation) Chicago Fire
14	MF	Fatai Alashe	October 21, 1993 (aged 21)	(United States Soccer Federation) San Jose Earthquakes
15	MF	Marc Pelosi	June 17, 1994 (aged 21)	(United States Soccer Federation) San Jose Earthquakes
16	MF	Gedion Zelalem	January 26, 1997 (aged 18)	(Scottish Football Association) Rangers
17	FW	Jerome Kiesewetter	February 9, 1993 (aged 22)	(German Football Association) VfB Stuttgart
18	GK	Charlie Horton	September 14, 1994 (aged 21)	(The Football Association) Leeds United
19	FW	Maki Tall	October 30, 1995 (aged 19)	(Swiss Football Association) Sion
20	MF	Gboly Ariyibi	January 18, 1995 (aged 20)	(The Football Association) Chesterfield

== Group B ==
=== Costa Rica ===
Head coach: Luis Fernando Fallas

No.	Pos.	Player	Date of birth (age)	Club
1	GK	Carlos Martinez	April 21, 1993 (aged 22)	(Costa Rican Football Federation) C.S. Cartaginés
2	DF	Jhamir Ordain	July 29, 1993 (aged 22)	(Costa Rican Football Federation) Santos FC
3	DF	Julio Cascante	October 3, 1993 (aged 21)	(Costa Rican Football Federation) Universidad de Costa Rica
4	MF	Christian Martínez	April 19, 1994 (aged 21)	(Costa Rican Football Federation) Municipal Liberia
5	DF	William Fernandez	May 15, 1994 (aged 21)	(Costa Rican Football Federation) C.S. Cartaginés
6	MF	Berny Burke	March 16, 1996 (aged 19)	(Costa Rican Football Federation) Santos FC
7	MF	David Ramírez	May 28, 1993 (aged 22)	(Costa Rican Football Federation) Deportivo Saprissa
8	MF	Luis Sequeira	March 11, 1994 (aged 21)	(Costa Rican Football Federation) Liga Deportiva Alajuelense
9	FW	Kenneth Dixon	November 1, 1993 (aged 21)	(Costa Rican Football Federation) Liga Deportiva Alajuelense
10	MF	Dylan Flores	May 30, 1993 (aged 22)	(Costa Rican Football Federation) Deportivo Saprissa
11	MF	John Jairo Ruiz	January 10, 1994 (aged 21)	(Ukrainian Association of Football) FC Dnipro
12	MF	Ulises Segura	June 13, 1993 (aged 22)	(Costa Rican Football Federation) Deportivo Saprissa
13	MF	Steve Garita	September 10, 1993 (aged 22)	(Costa Rican Football Federation) Liga Deportiva Alajuelense
14	DF	Bryan Espinoza	March 26, 1994 (aged 21)	(Costa Rican Football Federation) Belen FC
15	MF	Joseph Mora	January 15, 1993 (aged 22)	(Costa Rican Football Federation) Deportivo Saprissa
16	MF	Allan Cruz	February 24, 1996 (aged 19)	(Costa Rican Football Federation) Uruguay de Coronado
17	FW	Ronald Matarrita	July 9, 1994 (aged 21)	(Costa Rican Football Federation) Liga Deportiva Alajuelense
18	GK	Darryl Parker	March 7, 1993 (aged 22)	(Costa Rican Football Federation) Uruguay de Coronado
19	MF	Freddy Álvarez	April 26, 1995 (aged 20)	(Costa Rican Football Federation) Universidad de Costa Rica
20	GK	Jairo Monge	January 28, 1993 (aged 22)	(Costa Rican Football Federation) Limon FC

=== Haiti ===
Head coach: (France) Marc Collat

No.	Pos.	Player	Date of birth (age)	Club
1	GK	Luis Valendi Odelus	December 1, 1994 (aged 20)	(Haitian Football Federation) Aigle Noir
2	DF	Stephane Lambese	November 1, 1995 (aged 19)	(French Football Federation) Paris Saint Germain
3	DF	Alex Jr Christian	June 12, 1993 (aged 22)	(Portuguese Football Federation) Boavista FC
4	MF	Benderlin Beaubrun	January 29, 1996 (aged 19)	(Haitian Football Federation) Aigle Noir
5	DF	Jude Saint Louis	June 24, 1993 (aged 22)	(Haitian Football Federation) Baltimore SC
6	MF	Fernander Demas	December 31, 1996 (aged 18)	(Haitian Football Federation) Tempête FC
7	MF	Jhon Miky Benchy Estama	June 14, 1994 (aged 21)	(Haitian Football Federation) Don Bosco FC
8	DF	Chadeley Germain	September 22, 1994 (aged 21)	(Haitian Football Federation) Petit Goave FC
9	FW	Jonel Desire	February 12, 1997 (aged 18)	(Haitian Football Federation) AS Mirebalais
10	MF	Woodensky Marlet Cherenfant	January 16, 1995 (aged 20)	(Haitian Football Federation) Football Inter Club Association
11	FW	Christiano Francois	July 17, 1993 (aged 22)	(Portuguese Football Federation) SC Vila Real
12	GK	Ronald Elusma	September 8, 1993 (aged 22)	(Haitian Football Federation) Tempête FC
13	MF	Venel Saint Fort	December 20, 1996 (aged 18)	(Haitian Football Federation) Don Bosco FC
14	DF	Paulson Pierre	July 7, 1993 (aged 22)	(Haitian Football Federation) Baltimore SC
15	DF	Lucson Elie	April 14, 1993 (aged 22)	(Haitian Football Federation) Violette AC
16	MF	Zachary Herivaux	February 1, 1996 (aged 19)	(United States Soccer Federation) New England Revolution
17	FW	Nerlin Saint-Vil	February 16, 1996 (aged 19)	(Haitian Football Federation) Aigle Noir
18	DF	Severe Verilus	February 7, 1994 (aged 21)	(Haitian Football Federation) Ouanaminthe FC
19	FW	Manchini Telfort	September 30, 1994 (aged 21)	(Haitian Football Federation) Cavaly AS
23	GK	Ramos Pointe Jour	April 6, 1995 (aged 20)	(Haitian Football Federation) America FC

=== Honduras ===
Marcelo Pereira was replaced with Emerson Lalin prior to the tournament beginning, Brayan García was replaced Elder Torres with prior to the tournament beginning, Bryan Róchez was replaced with Allan Benegas prior to the tournament beginning

No.	Pos.	Player	Date of birth (age)	Club
1	GK	Luis López	September 13, 1993 (aged 22)	(National Autonomous Federation of Football of Honduras) Real España
2	DF	Jonathan Paz	June 18, 1995 (aged 20)	(National Autonomous Federation of Football of Honduras) Real Sociedad
3	DF	Marcelo Pereira	May 27, 1995 (aged 20)	(National Autonomous Federation of Football of Honduras) Motagua
4	DF	Klifox Bernárdez	September 18, 1994 (aged 21)	(National Autonomous Federation of Football of Honduras) Motagua
5	DF	Allans Vargas	September 25, 1993 (aged 22)	(National Autonomous Federation of Football of Honduras) Real España
6	MF	Bryan Acosta	November 24, 1993 (aged 21)	(National Autonomous Federation of Football of Honduras) Real España
7	DF	José Barralaga	December 22, 1994 (aged 20)	(National Autonomous Federation of Football of Honduras) Real Sociedad
8	MF	Marcelo Espinal	February 24, 1993 (aged 22)	(National Autonomous Federation of Football of Honduras) Vida
9	FW	Anthony Lozano	April 25, 1993 (aged 22)	(Royal Spanish Football Federation) Tenerife
10	MF	Óscar Salas	December 8, 1993 (aged 21)	(National Autonomous Federation of Football of Honduras) Olimpia
11	FW	Allan Benegas	October 4, 1994 (aged 20)	(National Autonomous Federation of Football of Honduras) Marathon
12	GK	Roberto López	April 23, 1995 (aged 20)	(National Autonomous Federation of Football of Honduras) Real España
13	FW	Darwin Espinal	January 16, 1995 (aged 20)	(United States Soccer Federation) Tampa Bay Rowdies
14	MF	Joshua Nieto	September 3, 1994 (aged 21)	(National Autonomous Federation of Football of Honduras) Motagua
15	DF	Kevin Álvarez	August 3, 1996 (aged 19)	(National Autonomous Federation of Football of Honduras) Olimpia
16	DF	Elder Torres	April 14, 1995 (aged 20)	(National Autonomous Federation of Football of Honduras) Vida
17	FW	Alberth Elis	February 12, 1996 (aged 19)	(National Autonomous Federation of Football of Honduras) Olimpia
18	GK	Harold Fonseca	October 8, 1993 (aged 21)	(National Autonomous Federation of Football of Honduras) Juticalpa
19	FW	Kevin López	February 3, 1996 (aged 19)	(National Autonomous Federation of Football of Honduras) Motagua
20	MF	Jhow Benavídez	December 26, 1995 (aged 19)	(National Autonomous Federation of Football of Honduras) Real España

=== Mexico ===
Head coach: (Mexico) Raul Gutierrez

No.	Pos.	Player	Date of birth (age)	Club
1	GK	Gibran Lajud	December 25, 1993 (aged 21)	(Mexican Football Federation) Tijuana
2	DF	Josecarlos Van Rankin	May 14, 1993 (aged 22)	(Mexican Football Federation) UNAM
3	DF	Hedgardo Marín	February 21, 1993 (aged 22)	(Mexican Football Federation) Guadalajara
4	DF	Carlos Salcedo	September 29, 1993 (aged 22)	(Mexican Football Federation) Guadalajara
5	DF	Rodolfo Pizarro	October 15, 1994 (aged 20)	(Mexican Football Federation) Pachuca
6	MF	Érick Gutiérrez	June 17, 1995 (aged 20)	(Mexican Football Federation) Pachuca
7	MF	Alfonso González	September 5, 1994 (aged 21)	(Mexican Football Federation) Atlas
8	MF	Raúl López	February 23, 1993 (aged 22)	(Mexican Football Federation) Guadalajara
9	FW	Érick Torres	January 19, 1993 (aged 22)	(United States Soccer Federation) Houston Dynamo
10	MF	Víctor Guzmán	February 3, 1995 (aged 20)	(Mexican Football Federation) Pachuca
11	FW	Marco Bueno	March 31, 1994 (aged 21)	(Mexican Football Federation) León
12	GK	Luis Cárdenas	September 15, 1993 (aged 22)	(Mexican Football Federation) Monterrey
13	DF	Luis López	August 25, 1993 (aged 22)	(Mexican Football Federation) Monterrey
14	DF	Jordan Silva	July 30, 1994 (aged 21)	(Mexican Football Federation) Toluca
15	DF	Érick Aguirre	February 23, 1997 (aged 18)	(Mexican Football Federation) Morelia
16	MF	Daniel Álvarez	July 22, 1994 (aged 21)	(Mexican Football Federation) Atlas
17	MF	Hirving Lozano	July 30, 1995 (aged 20)	(Mexican Football Federation) Pachuca
18	MF	Alfonso Tamay	May 13, 1993 (aged 22)	(Mexican Football Federation) Puebla
19	FW	Luis Loroña	June 21, 1993 (aged 22)	(Mexican Football Federation) Chiapas
20	GK	Raúl Gudiño	April 22, 1996 (aged 19)	(Portuguese Football Federation) Porto
