= Football at the 2014 Central American and Caribbean Games – Men's team squads =

The player listings are published the Veracruz 2014 website.

Although the competition is considered to be an under-21 age group competition, up to three players born before 1 January 1993 may be named in the squad.

Players marked in boldface have been capped at full international level.

== Group A ==
=== Mexico ===
Head Coach: (Mexico) Raúl Gutiérrez

No.	Pos.	Player	Date of birth (age)	Club
1	GK	**Gibrán Lajud**	25 December 1993 (age 31)	(Mexican Football Federation) Tijuana
2	DF	Gil Burón	11 June 1994 (age 31)	(Mexican Football Federation) América
3	DF	**Hedgardo Marín**	21 February 1993 (age 32)	(Mexican Football Federation) Guadalajara
4	DF	**Carlos Salcedo**	29 September 1993 (age 32)	(United States Soccer Federation) Real Salt Lake
5	DF	Bernardo Hernández de León	10 June 1993 (age 32)	(Mexican Football Federation) Monterrey
6	MF	Pedro Hernández	27 August 1993 (age 32)	(Mexican Football Federation) Sinaloa
7	MF	Alfonso Tamay	13 May 1993 (age 32)	(Mexican Football Federation) Puebla
8	MF	Uvaldo Luna	21 December 1993 (age 31)	(Mexican Football Federation) UANL
9	FW	**Erick Torres**	19 January 1993 (age 32)	(United States Soccer Federation) Chivas USA
10	FW	Martín Zúñiga	14 April 1993 (age 32)	(Mexican Football Federation) América
11	MF	Armando Zamorano	3 October 1993 (age 32)	(Mexican Football Federation) Morelia
12	GK	Luis Cárdenas	15 September 1993 (age 32)	(Mexican Football Federation) Monterrey
13	DF	Carlos Guzmán	19 May 1994 (age 31)	(Mexican Football Federation) Morelia
14	DF	Antonio Briseño	2 February 1994 (age 31)	(Mexican Football Federation) UANL
15	DF	Jorge Caballero	25 January 1994 (age 31)	(Mexican Football Federation) Monterrey
16	MF	Jonathan Espericueta	9 August 1994 (age 31)	(Royal Spanish Football Federation) Villarreal B
17	MF	Daniel Hernández	16 February 1994 (age 31)	(Mexican Football Federation) Atlas
18	MF	**Raúl López**	23 February 1993 (age 32)	(Mexican Football Federation) Tepic
19	FW	**Ángel Zaldívar**	21 June 1993 (age 32)	(Mexican Football Federation) Guadalajara
20	FW	**Marco Bueno**	31 March 1994 (age 31)	(Mexican Football Federation) Toluca

=== Honduras ===
Head Coach: (Honduras) Jorge Jiménez

No.	Pos.	Player	Date of birth (age)	Club
1	GK	Cristian Hernández	22 September 1996 (aged 18)	(National Autonomous Federation of Football of Honduras)
2	DF	**Kevin Álvarez**	3 August 1996 (aged 18)	(National Autonomous Federation of Football of Honduras)
3	DF	Rodolfo Espinal		(National Autonomous Federation of Football of Honduras)
4	DF	Luis Santos	5 March 1996 (aged 18)	(National Autonomous Federation of Football of Honduras)
5	DF	Lesvin Medina		(National Autonomous Federation of Football of Honduras)
6	MF	**Wilmer Fuentes**	21 April 1992 (aged 22)	(National Autonomous Federation of Football of Honduras)
7	FW	**Michaell Chirinos**	17 June 1995 (aged 19)	(National Autonomous Federation of Football of Honduras)
8	MF	Rolin Álvarez	14 June 1995 (aged 19)	(National Autonomous Federation of Football of Honduras)
9	FW	**Bryan Róchez**	1 January 1995 (aged 19)	(National Autonomous Federation of Football of Honduras)
10	MF	José Escalante	29 May 1995 (aged 19)	(National Autonomous Federation of Football of Honduras)
11	FW	**Alberth Elis**	12 February 1996 (aged 18)	(National Autonomous Federation of Football of Honduras)
12	GK	Roberto López	23 April 1995 (aged 19)	(National Autonomous Federation of Football of Honduras)
13	MF	**Jhow Benavídez**	26 December 1995 (aged 18)	(National Autonomous Federation of Football of Honduras)
14	FW	**Christian Martínez**	8 September 1990 (aged 24)	(National Autonomous Federation of Football of Honduras)
15	DF	**Maylor Núñez**	5 July 1996 (aged 18)	(National Autonomous Federation of Football of Honduras)
16	DF	**Devron García**	17 February 1996 (aged 18)	(National Autonomous Federation of Football of Honduras)
17	FW	**Eddie Hernández**	27 February 1991 (aged 23)	(National Autonomous Federation of Football of Honduras)
18	MF	**Kevin López**	3 February 1996 (aged 18)	(National Autonomous Federation of Football of Honduras)
19	FW	**Júnior Lacayo**	19 August 1995 (aged 19)	(Mexican Football Federation) Santos Laguna
20	MF	**Deybi Flores**	16 June 1996 (aged 18)	(National Autonomous Federation of Football of Honduras)

=== Jamaica ===
Head coach: Theodore Whitmore

No.	Pos.	Player	Date of birth (age)	Club
		**Cardel Benbow**	6 March 1995 (aged 19)	(Jamaica Football Federation)
		Rennico Clarke	26 August 1995 (aged 19)	(Jamaica Football Federation)
		Derron Duncan	30 April 1989 (aged 25)	(Jamaica Football Federation)
		Hugh Evans	10 March 1994 (aged 20)	(Jamaica Football Federation)
		Anthony Greenland	23 June 1995 (aged 19)	(Jamaica Football Federation)
		**Vishinul Harris**	8 July 1993 (aged 21)	(Jamaica Football Federation)
		Oshane Jenkins	28 February 1994 (aged 20)	(Jamaica Football Federation)
		Keneil Kirlew	8 February 1993 (aged 21)	(Jamaica Football Federation)
		**Shawn Lawes**	7 March 1993 (aged 21)	(Jamaica Football Federation)
		Kereen Manning	11 June 1993 (aged 21)	(Jamaica Football Federation)
		**Chevone Marsh**	5 February 1994 (aged 20)	(Jamaica Football Federation)
		Fabian Mccarthy	1 August 1990 (aged 24)	(Jamaica Football Federation)
		Sean Mcfarlane	4 April 1993 (aged 21)	(Jamaica Football Federation)
		David Mitchell	2 September 1993 (aged 21)	(Jamaica Football Federation)
		Cleon Pryce	1 April 1994 (aged 20)	(Jamaica Football Federation)
		Khandean Smith	11 May 1993 (aged 21)	(Jamaica Football Federation)
		Kyle Smith	26 May 1995 (aged 19)	(Jamaica Football Federation)
		Javaun Waugh	6 November 1995 (aged 19)	(Jamaica Football Federation)
		Paul Wilson	6 July 1993 (aged 21)	(Jamaica Football Federation)
		Jermaine Wozencraft	9 August 1992 (aged 22)	(Jamaica Football Federation)

=== El Salvador ===
Head Coach: (El Salvador) Mauricio Alfaro

No.	Pos.	Player	Date of birth (age)	Club
1	GK	Rolando Morales	1 March 1994 (aged 20)	(Salvadoran Football Federation) Alianza
2	DF	Oliver Ayala	4 January 1994 (aged 20)	(Salvadoran Football Federation) Alianza
3	DF	**Roberto Domínguez**	13 January 1993 (aged 21)	(Salvadoran Football Federation)
4	DF	**Bryan Tamacas**	21 February 1994 (aged 20)	(Salvadoran Football Federation) FAS
5	MF	Bryan Landaverde	27 May 1995 (aged 19)	(Salvadoran Football Federation) UES
6	MF	**Narciso Orellana**		(Salvadoran Football Federation) Isidro Metapan
7	FW	**Jairo Henríquez**	31 August 1993 (aged 21)	(Mexican Football Federation) Tlaxcala
8	MF	Álvaro Lizama		(Salvadoran Football Federation) Aguila
9	FW	**Rafael Burgos**	3 June 1988 (aged 26)	(United States Soccer Federation) Minnesota United
10	MF	Diego Galdamez	26 August 1994 (aged 20)	(Salvadoran Football Federation) Aguila
11	FW	Bryan Pérez		(Salvadoran Football Federation) Luis Angel Firpo
12	DF	Marvin Baumgartner	13 January 1993 (aged 21)	(Swiss Football Association) Wettswil-Bonstetten
13	DF	Miguel Lemus	26 October 1993 (aged 21)	(Salvadoran Football Federation) FAS
14	MF	**Santos Ortiz**	22 January 1990 (aged 24)	(Salvadoran Football Federation) Dragón
15	MF	René Gómez	8 January 1993 (aged 21)	(Salvadoran Football Federation) Aguila
16	FW	Kevin Sagastizado		(Salvadoran Football Federation) Pasaquina
17	DF	Kevin Mendoza		(Salvadoran Football Federation) Alianza
18	GK	Carlos Cañas		(Salvadoran Football Federation)
19	FW	**José Ángel Peña**	10 December 1994 (aged 19)	(Mexican Football Federation) UANL
20	DF	**Juan Barahona**	12 February 1996 (aged 18)	(Salvadoran Football Federation) Santa Tecla

== Group B ==
=== Costa Rica ===
Head Coach: (Costa Rica) Paulo Wanchope

No.	Pos.	Player	Date of birth (age)	Club
1	GK	Jairo Monge	28 January 1994 (aged 20)	(Costa Rican Football Federation) Limón
18	GK	Jorge Jara	5 January 1996 (aged 18)	(Costa Rican Football Federation) Saprissa
4	DF	Erick Cabalceta	9 January 1993 (aged 21)	(Costa Rican Football Federation) Cartaginés
2	DF	José Sosa	4 October 1994 (aged 20)	(Costa Rican Football Federation) Uruguay
5	DF	William Fernández	15 May 1994 (aged 20)	(Costa Rican Football Federation) Cartaginés
14	DF	Bryan Espinoza	26 March 1994 (aged 20)	(Costa Rican Football Federation) Jacó Rays
12	DF	Steve Garita	10 September 1993 (aged 21)	(Costa Rican Football Federation) Alajuelense
6	DF	William Quirós	19 October 1994 (aged 20)	(Costa Rican Football Federation) Belén
15	DF	Josep Mora	15 January 1993 (aged 21)	(Costa Rican Football Federation) Belén
	MF	Dylan Flores		(Costa Rican Football Federation) Uruguay
	MF	Kennet Dixon		(Costa Rican Football Federation) Santos
13	MF	Juan Arguedas	8 July 1994 (aged 20)	(United States Soccer Federation) University of Jacksonville
11	MF	Randal Leal	14 January 1997 (aged 17)	(Costa Rican Football Federation) Belén
10	MF	Ulises Segura	23 June 1993 (aged 21)	(Costa Rican Football Federation) Uruguay
16	MF	Axel Myers	4 March 1994 (aged 20)	(Costa Rican Football Federation) Uruguay
8	MF	Luis Sequeira	11 May 1994 (aged 20)	(Costa Rican Football Federation) Alajuelense
3	MF	Jhamir Ordian	29 July 1993 (aged 21)	(Costa Rican Football Federation) Santos
19	FW	James Hudson	4 December 1994 (aged 19)	(Costa Rican Football Federation) Limón
17	FW	Ivan Ramírez	20 October 1994 (aged 20)	(Costa Rican Football Federation) Santos
9	FW	Francisco Rodríguez	8 February 1993 (aged 21)	(Costa Rican Football Federation) Carmelita

=== Haiti ===
Head coach: (France) Jérôme Velfert

No.	Pos.	Player	Date of birth (age)	Club
		Benderlin Beaubrun	29 January 1996 (aged 18)	(Haitian Football Federation)
		Alessandro Campoy	7 June 1997 (aged 17)	(Haitian Football Federation)
		Guitho Charles	17 May 1995 (aged 19)	(Haitian Football Federation)
		Woodensky Cherefant	16 January 1995 (aged 19)	(Haitian Football Federation)
		Fernander Demas	31 December 1996 (aged 17)	(Haitian Football Federation)
		Jonel Désiré	12 February 1997 (aged 17)	(Haitian Football Federation)
		Zachary Herivaux	1 February 1996 (aged 18)	(Haitian Football Federation)
		Jean Jean Becker	18 January 1995 (aged 19)	(Haitian Football Federation)
		Peterson Joseph, Jr.	20 January 1996 (aged 18)	(Haitian Football Federation)
		Roberto Luima	4 March 1997 (aged 17)	(Haitian Football Federation)
		Bebeto Muraille	6 September 1996 (aged 18)	(Haitian Football Federation)
		Wilmond Oracius	18 March 1997 (aged 17)	(Haitian Football Federation)
		Marckendel Paul	21 December 1995 (aged 18)	(Haitian Football Federation)
		Rodlin Philogene	16 July 1996 (aged 18)	(Haitian Football Federation)
		Francy Pierre	7 December 1997 (aged 16)	(Haitian Football Federation)
		Venel Saint-Fort	21 December 1996 (aged 17)	(Haitian Football Federation)
		Jerry Saint-Vil	22 June 1995 (aged 19)	(Haitian Football Federation)
		Steve Sanon	7 January 1996 (aged 18)	(Haitian Football Federation)
		Roosse Similien	17 May 1996 (aged 18)	(Haitian Football Federation)
		Nerlin Saint-Vil	16 February 1996 (aged 18)	(Haitian Football Federation)

=== Venezuela ===
Head coach: Miguel Echenausi

No.	Pos.	Player	Date of birth (age)	Club
		Juan Carlos Azócar	1 October 1995 (aged 19)	(Venezuelan Football Federation)
		Carlos Sosa	6 June 1995 (aged 19)	(Venezuelan Football Federation)
		Beycker Velásquez	6 October 1996 (aged 18)	(Venezuelan Football Federation)
		**Carlos Cermeño**	9 August 1995 (aged 19)	(Venezuelan Football Federation)
		Franko Díaz	9 February 1996 (aged 18)	(Venezuelan Football Federation)
		Ronaldo Peña	10 March 1997 (aged 17)	(Venezuelan Football Federation)
		Kleiner Escorcia	11 July 1995 (aged 19)	(Venezuelan Football Federation)
		**Andrés Ponce**	11 November 1996 (aged 18)	(Venezuelan Football Federation)
		**Jefferson Savarino**	11 November 1996 (aged 18)	(Venezuelan Football Federation)
		Jefre Vargas	12 January 1995 (aged 19)	(Venezuelan Football Federation)
		José Luis Marrufo	12 May 1996 (aged 18)	(Venezuelan Football Federation)
		Yanowsky Reyes	15 May 1996 (aged 18)	(Venezuelan Football Federation)
		Jhonny González	15 September 1995 (aged 19)	(Venezuelan Football Federation)
		Ayrton Páez	16 January 1995 (aged 19)	(Venezuelan Football Federation)
		Óscar Guillén	17 May 1996 (aged 18)	(Venezuelan Football Federation)
		Luís Jiménez Vivas	18 January 1996 (aged 18)	(Venezuelan Football Federation)
		Rubén Ramírez	18 October 1995 (aged 19)	(Venezuelan Football Federation)
		José Caraballo	21 February 1996 (aged 18)	(Venezuelan Football Federation)
		**Adalberto Peñaranda**	21 May 1997 (aged 17)	(Venezuelan Football Federation)
		**Jhon Murillo**	21 November 1995 (aged 18)	(Venezuelan Football Federation)

=== Cuba ===
No.	Pos.	Player	Date of birth (age)	Club
1	GK	**Sandy Sánchez**	24 May 1994 (aged 20)	(Football Association of Cuba)
2	DF	**Andy Baquero**	17 March 1994 (aged 20)	(Football Association of Cuba)
3	MF	**Emmanuel Labrada**	19 January 1994 (aged 20)	(Football Association of Cuba)
4	MF	Yolexis Collado	21 February 1994 (aged 20)	(Football Association of Cuba)
5	MF	Jorge Clavelo	8 August 1982 (aged 32)	(Football Association of Cuba)
6	DF	**Yosel Piedra**	27 March 1994 (aged 20)	(Football Association of Cuba)
7	DF	David Urgelles	24 April 1995 (aged 19)	(Football Association of Cuba)
8	MF	Yordan Santa	7 October 1993 (aged 21)	(Football Association of Cuba)
9	FW	**Maykel Reyes**	4 March 1993 (aged 21)	(Football Association of Cuba)
10	FW	Héctor Morales	19 January 1993 (aged 21)	(Football Association of Cuba)
11	MF	**Dairon Pérez**	7 January 1994 (aged 20)	(Football Association of Cuba)
13	DF	Brian Rosales	7 March 1995 (aged 19)	(Football Association of Cuba)
14	MF	Aricheell Hernández	20 September 1993 (aged 21)	(Football Association of Cuba)
15	DF	**Adrián Diz**	4 March 1994 (aged 20)	(Football Association of Cuba)
16	MF	**Daniel Luis**	11 May 1994 (aged 20)	(Football Association of Cuba)
17	MF	Pedro Anderson	9 November 1993 (aged 21)	(Football Association of Cuba)
18	DF	**Abel Martínez**	3 June 1993 (aged 21)	(Football Association of Cuba)
20	DF	**Alain Cervantes**	17 November 1983 (aged 30)	(Football Association of Cuba)
21	GK	**Elier Pozo**	28 January 1995 (aged 19)	(Football Association of Cuba)
