= Felomina =

Felomina is a surname. Notable people with the surname include:

- Lesley Felomina (born 1972), Curaçaoan and Aruban footballer
- Shuremy Felomina (born 1995), Curaçaoan footballer
