= Glenroy Samuel =

Glenroy Samuel is the name of:

- Glenroy Samuel (footballer, born 1990), Trinidad and Tobago footballer
- Glenroy Samuel (footballer, born 1994), Saint Kitts & Nevis footballer
