= 2015 CONCACAF Men's Olympic Qualifying Championship =

North American football tournament

CONCACAF MEN'S OLYMPIC QUALIFYING 2015

Tournament details
- Host country: United States
- Dates: 1–13 October
- Teams: 8 (from 1 confederation)
- Venue: 4 (in 4 host cities)

Final positions
- Champions: Mexico (7th title)
- Runners-up: Honduras
- Third place: United States
- Fourth place: Canada

Tournament statistics
- Matches played: 16
- Goals scored: 46 (2.88 per match)
- Top scorer(s): (Honduras) Alberth Elis (United States) Jerome Kiesewetter (4 goals each)
- Best player: (Mexico) Hirving Lozano
- Best goalkeeper: (Mexico) Gibran Lajud
- Fair play award: Mexico

The 2015 CONCACAF Men's Olympic Qualifying Championship was the fourteenth edition of the CONCACAF Men's Olympic Qualifying, the quadrennial, international, age-restricted football tournament organized by CONCACAF to determine which men's under-23 national teams from the North, Central America and Caribbean region qualify for the Olympic football tournament. It was held in the United States, from 1 and 13 October 2015

Mexico successfully defended their title after a 2–0 win over Honduras in the final. It was their seventh Pre-Olympic title and second in a row, after previous wins in 1964, 1972, 1976, 1996, 2004 and 2012. As the top two teams, Mexico and Honduras both qualified for the 2016 Summer Olympics in Brazil as the CONCACAF representatives, just as the same sides had in the previous Olympics. Third-placed United States later lost to Colombia in the CONCACAF–CONMEBOL play-off and failed to qualify for the Olympics for the second consecutive time.

== Qualification ==
The eight berths were allocated to the three regional zones as follows:

- Three teams from the North American Zone (NAFU), i.e., Canada, Mexico and the hosts United States, who all qualified automatically due to them being the only teams in the region
- Three teams from the Central American Zone (UNCAF)
- Two teams from the Caribbean Zone (CFU)

Regional qualification tournaments were held to determine the five teams joining Canada, Mexico, and the United States at the final tournament.

=== Qualified teams ===
The following teams qualified for the final tournament.

Zone	Country	Method of qualification	Appearance	Last appearance	Previous best performance	Previous Olympic appearances (last)
North America	United States (hosts)	Automatic	10th	2012	Winners (1988, 1992)	14 (2008)
North America	Canada	Automatic	8th	2012	Runners-up (1984, 1996)	3 (1984)
North America	Mexico (title holders)	Automatic	11th	2012	Winners (1964, 1972, 1976, 1996, 2004, 2012)	10 (2012)
Central America	Panama	Group A winners	6th	2012	Fourth place (1964)	0
Central America	Honduras	Group B winners	6th	2012	Winners (2000, 2008)	3 (2012)
Central America	Costa Rica	Play-offs winners	6th	2004	Winners (1980, 1984)	3 (2004)
Caribbean	Haiti	Final round winners	2nd	2008	Group stage (2008)	0
Caribbean	Cuba	Final round runners-up	5th	2012	Third place (1976, 1984)	2 (1980)

== Venues ==
Four cities served as the venues for tournament.

Kansas City, Kansas	Carson, California (Los Angeles Area)	Commerce City, Colorado (Denver Area)	Sandy, Utah (Salt Lake City Area)
Sporting Park	StubHub Center	Dick's Sporting Goods Park	Rio Tinto Stadium
Capacity: 27,000	Capacity: 21,000	Capacity: 18,061	Capacity: 20,213
Location of the host cities of the 2015 CONCACAF Men's Olympic Qualifying Championship.

== Draw ==
The draw for the tournament took place on 18 August 2015 at 09:00 PDT (UTC−7) at the Torrance Marriot Redondo Beach hotel in Torrance, California, United States. The draw was conducted by Eddie Lewis and Brad Friedel.

The eight teams were drawn into two groups of four teams. Tournament host United States were seeded in Group A, while defending CONCACAF Olympic Qualifying Championship champion and 2012 Olympic gold medalist Mexico were seeded in Group B.

The draw took place before the UNCAF final qualifier (Costa Rica) had been confirmed.

Pot 1	Pot 2	Pot 3	Pot 4
United States (Group A); Mexico (Group B)	Honduras; Panama	Cuba; Haiti	Canada; Costa Rica

== Match officials ==
Referees

- (Barbados) Adrian Skeete
- (Belize) Christopher Reid
- (Canada) Mathieu Bourdeau
- (Canada) Drew Fischer
- (Costa Rica) Hugo Cruz
- (Guatemala) Juan Guerra
- (Honduras) Armando Castro
- (Jamaica) Karl Tyrell
- (Mexico) Luis Enrique Santander
- (Panama) Jafeth Perea
- (Puerto Rico) Javier Santos
- (United States) Armando Villarreal

Assistant referees

- (Belize) Ricardo Ake
- (Canada) Joe Fletcher
- (Costa Rica) Carlos Fernandez
- (Guatemala) Ronaldo De La Cruz
- (Honduras) Oscar Velazquez
- (Mexico) Israel Valenciano
- (Panama) Ronald Bruna
- (Puerto Rico) Jairo Morales
- (Saint Kitts and Nevis) Graeme Brown
- (Trinidad and Tobago) Ainsley Rochard
- (United States) Frank Anderson
- (United States) Corey Rockwell

== Squads ==
Players born on or after 1 January 1993 were eligible to compete in the tournament. Each team could register a maximum of 20 players (two of whom must be goalkeepers).

== Group stage ==
The top two teams of each group advanced to the semi-finals. The teams were ranked according to points (3 points for a win, 1 point for a draw, 0 points for a loss). If tied on points, tiebreakers would be applied in the following order:

1. Goal difference in all group matches;
2. Greatest number of goals scored in all group matches;
3. Greatest number of points obtained in the group matches between the teams concerned;
4. Goal difference resulting from the group matches between the teams concerned;
5. Greater number of goals scored in all group matches between the teams concerned;
6. Drawing of lots.

The final round of fixtures in the group stage and the knockout stage fell within the FIFA International Match Calendar period of 5–13 October 2015. As a result, teams were able to call on their first choice under-23 players worldwide.

All times were local.

=== Group A ===
Pos	Team	Pld	W	D	L	GF	GA	GD	Pts	Qualification
1	United States (H)	3	3	0	0	13	2	+11	9	Knockout stage
2	Canada	3	1	1	1	6	6	0	4	Knockout stage
3	Cuba	3	0	2	1	4	9	−5	2	
4	Panama	3	0	1	2	2	8	−6	1	

Source: CONCACAF
(H) Hosts
1 October 2015
17:30 CDT (UTC−5)

Panama	1–1	Cuba
Nuñez 76'	Report	Reyes 6'

Sporting Park, Kansas City, Kansas
Attendance: 3,827
Referee: Luis Enrique Santander (Mexico)
1 October 2015
20:00 CDT (UTC−5)

United States	3–1	Canada
Morris 1', 73'; Gil 90+2' (pen.)	Report	Petrasso 81'

Sporting Park, Kansas City, Kansas
Attendance: 3,827
Referee: Armando Castro (Honduras)

3 October 2015
13:30 CDT (UTC−5)

Canada	3–1	Panama
Petrasso 30'; Thomas 34'; Fisk 74'	Report	Bárcenas 61'

Sporting Park, Kansas City, Kansas
Attendance: 3,755
Referee: Javier Santos (Puerto Rico)
3 October 2015
16:00 CDT (UTC−5)

Cuba	1–6	United States
Sáez 90+3'	Report	Carter-Vickers 16'; Miazga 35'; Kiesewetter 37', 49'; Hyndman 68'; Hernández 75'

Sporting Park, Kansas City, Kansas
Attendance: 3,755
Referee: Juan Guerra (Guatemala)

6 October 2015
17:00 MDT (UTC−6)

Canada	2–2	Cuba
Petrasso 25'; Babouli 52'	Report	Hernández 32', 87'

Dick's Sporting Goods Park, Commerce City, Colorado
Attendance: 3,313
Referee: Adrián Skeete (Barbados)
6 October 2015
19:30 MDT (UTC−6)

United States	4–0	Panama
Escobar 50' (o.g.); Kiesewetter 52'; Morris 56'; Gil 71' (pen.)	Report

Dick's Sporting Goods Park, Commerce City, Colorado
Attendance: 3,313
Referee: Hugo Cruz (Costa Rica)

=== Group B ===
Pos	Team	Pld	W	D	L	GF	GA	GD	Pts	Qualification
1	Mexico	3	3	0	0	7	1	+6	9	Knockout stage
2	Honduras	3	2	0	1	4	2	+2	6	Knockout stage
3	Haiti	3	0	1	2	1	3	−2	1	
4	Costa Rica	3	0	1	2	1	7	−6	1	

Source: CONCACAF
2 October 2015
18:00 PDT (UTC−7)

Honduras	1–0	Haiti
Lozano 6'	Report

StubHub Center, Carson, California
Referee: Drew Fischer (Canada)
2 October 2015
20:30 PDT (UTC−7)

Mexico	4–0	Costa Rica
Bueno 19', 77'; Fernández 45+2' (o.g.); Torres 88'	Report

StubHub Center, Carson, California
Referee: Jafeth Perea (Panama)

4 October 2015
13:30 PDT (UTC−7)

Costa Rica	0–2	Honduras
	Report	Lozano 41'; Elis 82'

StubHub Center, Carson, California
Referee: Christopher Reid (Belize)
4 October 2015
16:00 PDT (UTC−7)

Haiti	0–1	Mexico
	Report	R. López 74' (pen.)

StubHub Center, Carson, California
Referee: Mathieu Bourdeau (Canada)

7 October 2015
17:00 MDT (UTC−6)

Costa Rica	1−1	Haiti
Flores 82'	Report	Pierre 51'

Dick's Sporting Goods Park, Commerce City, Colorado
Referee: Karl Tyrell (Jamaica)
7 October 2015
19:30 MDT (UTC−6)

Mexico	2–1	Honduras
R. López 4'; Torres 65'	Report	Elis 59'

Dick's Sporting Goods Park, Commerce City, Colorado
Referee: Armando Villarreal (United States)

== Knockout stage ==
In the knockout stage, extra time and a penalty shoot-out were used to decide the winner if necessary.

=== Bracket ===
Semi-finals
10 October – Sandy, UT
United States	0
Honduras	2
10 October – Sandy, UT
Mexico	2
Canada	0

Final
13 October – Sandy, UT
Honduras	0
Mexico	2
Third place play-off
13 October – Sandy, UT
United States	2
Canada	0

=== Semi-finals ===
The semi-final winners qualified for the 2016 Summer Olympics.

10 October 2015
13:00 MDT (UTC−6)

United States	0–2	Honduras
	Report	Elis 23', 77'

Rio Tinto Stadium, Sandy, Utah
Referee: Jafeth Perea (Panama)

10 October 2015
16:00 MDT (UTC−6)

Mexico	2–0	Canada
Torres 6'; Lozano 57'	Report

Rio Tinto Stadium, Sandy, Utah
Referee: Hugo Cruz (Costa Rica)

=== Third place play-off ===
The winners advanced to the CONCACAF–CONMEBOL play-off.

13 October 2015
17:00 MDT (UTC−6)

United States	2–0	Canada
Pelosi 69'; Kiesewetter 84' (pen.)	Report

Rio Tinto Stadium, Sandy, Utah
Referee: Luis Enrique Santander (Mexico)

=== Final ===
13 October 2015
20:00 MDT (UTC−6)

Honduras	0–2	Mexico
	Report	Acosta 42' (o.g.); Guzmán 68'

Rio Tinto Stadium, Sandy, Utah
Referee: Drew Fischer (Canada)

== Statistics ==
=== Goalscorers ===
4 goals

- (Honduras) Alberth Elis
- (United States) Jerome Kiesewetter

3 goals

- (Canada) Michael Petrasso
- (Mexico) Erick Torres
- (United States) Jordan Morris

2 goals

- (Honduras) Anthony Lozano
- (Mexico) Marco Bueno
- (Mexico) Raúl López
- (Cuba) Arichel Hernández
- (United States) Luis Gil

1 goal

- (Canada) Molham Babouli
- (Canada) Ben Fisk
- (Canada) Skylar Thomas
- (Costa Rica) Dylan Flores
- (Cuba) Maikel Reyes
- (Cuba) Daniel Luis Sáez
- (Haiti) Paulson Pierre
- (Mexico) Víctor Guzmán
- (Mexico) Hirving Lozano
- (Panama) Édgar Joel Bárcenas
- (Panama) Josiel Núñez
- (United States) Cameron Carter-Vickers
- (United States) Alonso Hernández
- (United States) Emerson Hyndman
- (United States) Matt Miazga
- (United States) Marc Pelosi

1 own goal

- (Costa Rica) William Fernández (playing against Mexico)
- (Honduras) Bryan Acosta (playing against Mexico)
- (Panama) Fidel Escobar (playing against USA)

=== Awards ===
The following awards were given at the conclusion of the tournament.

Golden Ball	Golden Boot	Golden Glove	Fair Play Award
(Mexico) Hirving Lozano	(United States) Jerome Kiesewetter (4 goals, 2 assists)	(Mexico) Gibrán Lajud	Mexico

Best XI
Goalkeeper	Defenders	Midfielders	Forwards
(Mexico) Gibrán Lajud	(Mexico) Érick Aguirre (Mexico) Jhonatan Paz (Mexico) Jordan Silva (Mexico) Rodolfo Pizarro	(Honduras) Alberth Elis (Mexico) Víctor Guzmán (Honduras) Óscar Salas (Mexico) Hirving Lozano	(Mexico) Erick Torres (United States) Jerome Kiesewetter

=== Final ranking ===
As per statistical convention in football, matches decided in extra time were counted as wins and losses, while matches decided by a penalty shoot-out were counted as draws.

Pos	Team	Pld	W	D	L	GF	GA	GD	Pts	Final result
1st place, gold medalist(s)	Mexico	5	5	0	0	11	1	+10	15	Winners
2nd place, silver medalist(s)	Honduras	5	3	0	2	6	4	+2	9	Runner-ups
3rd place, bronze medalist(s)	United States (H)	5	4	0	1	15	4	+11	12	Third place
4	Canada	5	1	1	3	6	10	−4	4	Fourth place
5	Cuba	3	0	2	1	4	9	−5	2	Eliminated in group stage
6	Haiti	3	0	1	2	1	3	−2	1	Eliminated in group stage
7	Panama	3	0	1	2	2	8	−6	1	Eliminated in group stage
8	Costa Rica	3	0	1	2	1	7	−6	1	Eliminated in group stage

Source: CONCACAF
(H) Hosts

== Qualified teams for 2016 Summer Olympics ==
The following two teams from CONCACAF qualified for the 2016 Summer Olympics Men's football tournament.

Team	Qualified on	Previous appearances in tournament^{1}
Honduras	10 October 2015	3 (2000, 2008, 2012)
Mexico	10 October 2015	10 (1928, 1948, 1964, 1968, 1972, 1976, 1992, 1996, 2004, **2012**)

^{1} Bold indicates champion for that year. Italic indicates host for that year.

== Broadcasters ==
=== Television ===
Country	Broadcaster		Ref.
Country	Free	Pay	Ref.
United States **(Host)**	Telemundo	Universo	

== Cuban defections ==
Four Cuban players were confirmed to have defected to the United States during the tournament: they were Emmanuel Labrada (CF Granma), Frank López García (FC Cienfuegos), Dairon Pérez (FC La Habana), and Yendry Torres (FC Cienfuegos).
