= Justin Simmons =

Justin Simmons may refer to:

- Justin Simmons (baseball) (born 1981), American baseball pitcher
- Justin Simmons (politician), American politician
- Justin Simmons (American football) (born 1993), American football safety
- Justin Simons, Panamanian footballer
