= Jean Scott =

Jean Scott may refer to:

- Jean Scott, Lady Ferniehirst (c. 1548 - after 1593) Scottish borders landowner
- Jean Scott (author), author of gambling books
- Jean Scott (figure skater), 1972 Olympian
- Jean Scott (football) (born 1994), Costa Rican association football player
- Jean Bruce Scott (born 1956), American television actress

== See also ==
- Gene Scott (disambiguation)
