= J prince =

J prince may refer to:

== People ==
- J Prince, Gospel Soca Artiste from Trinidad and Tobago
- James Prince, CEO of Houston-based Rap-a-Lot Records
