= Eugene Scott =

Eugene or Gene Scott may refer to:

- Gene Scott (1929–2005), pastor
- Eugene Scott (baseball) (1889–1947), Negro leagues catcher
- Gene Scott (tennis) (1937–2006), tennis player
- Eugene Scott (journalist), American journalist

== See also ==
- Eugenie Scott (born 1945), American physical anthropologist
- Jean Scott (disambiguation)
