= Sorencio Juliaans =

Surinamese footballer

Personal information
- Full name: Sorencio Guilliante Juliaans
- Date of birth: 4 March 1997 (age 29)
- Place of birth: Suriname
- Position: Midfielder

Team information
- Current team: S.V. Transvaal

Senior career*
Years	Team	Apps	(Gls)
2014–	S.V. Transvaal		

International career^{‡}
2010–2012	Suriname U17		
2016–	Suriname	6	(0)
- * Club domestic league appearances and goals ‡ National team caps and goals as of 30 October 2020

Sorencio Juliaans (born 4 March 1997) is a Surinamese footballer who currently plays for S.V. Transvaal and the Suriname national football team.

At the youth level he played in 2011 CONCACAF U-17 Championship qualifiers at the age of 13, scoring against Saint Vincent and the Grenadines. He played in the same event two years later.
