= José Longo =

Guatemalan footballer

Personal information
- Full name: José Javier Longo Ordóñez
- Date of birth: 24 May 1994 (age 32)
- Place of birth: Guatemala
- Position: Right-back

Team information
- Current team: Xelajú
- Number: 70

Youth career
- Xelajú

Senior career*
Years	Team	Apps	(Gls)
2011–2015	Xelajú	41	(4)
2015–2017	Municipal	47	(1)
2017–2020	Malacateco	107	(3)
2020–2021	Achuapa	19	(0)
2021–2022	Sololá	37	(0)
2022–2023	Xinabajul	54	(2)
2024–	Xelajú	24	(0)

International career
2015–2016	Guatemala	4	(0)
- * Club domestic league appearances and goals as of 20:16, 4 November 2024 (UTC)

José Longo (born 24 May 1994) is a Guatemalan football player who plays as a right-back for Liga Nacional club Xelajú.
