= Glenroy Samuel (footballer, born 1994) =

Saint Kitts and Kevis footballer

Personal information
- Full name: Glenroy Lajon Samuel
- Date of birth: 29 November 1994 (age 31)
- Position: Midfielder

Team information
- Current team: Conaree

Senior career*
Years	Team	Apps	(Gls)
2011–	Conaree		

International career^{‡}
- Saint Kitts and Nevis U17
- Saint Kitts and Nevis U23
2016–	Saint Kitts and Nevis	1	(0)
- * Club domestic league appearances and goals as of 14:46, 9 February 2018 (UTC) ‡ National team caps and goals as of 14:46, 9 February 2018 (UTC)

Glenroy Lajon Samuel (born 29 November 1994) is a Kittian international footballer who plays for Conaree, as a midfielder.

== Club career ==
Samuel has played club football for Conaree. Following a SKNFA Premier League match against Village Superstars on 20 April 2019, Samuel stabbed opposing player Raheem Francis. He was charged with attempted murder and released on bail.

== International career ==
At the youth level, he played in 2011 CONCACAF U-17 Championship qualification, where he scored six goals, and 2015 CONCACAF Men's Olympic Qualifying Championship qualification.

He made his senior international debut for Saint Kitts and Nevis in 2016.
