= Diquan Adamson =

Barbadian footballer (born 1994)

Personal information
- Date of birth: February 10, 1994 (age 32)
- Place of birth: Barbados
- Position: Forward

International career
Years	Team	Apps	(Gls)
2014	Barbados national football team	3	(1)

Diquan Adamson (born 10 February 1994) is a Barbadian footballer who plays as a striker. He played at the 2014 FIFA World Cup qualification.
