= Jean-François James =

Haitian footballer (born 1993)

Jean-Francois James
Personal information
- Full name: Jean-Francois James
- Date of birth: 15 August 1993 (age 33)
- Place of birth: Petit Goâve, Haiti
- Position: Striker

Youth career
- Le Mans

Senior career*
| Years | Team | Apps | (Gls) |
| 2009–2010 | Blois B | | |
| 2011–2013 | Le Mans B | 11 | (1) |
| 2013–2014 | Sablé FC | 5 | (0) |
| 2015–2016 | Rodez B | 15 | (3) |

International career^{‡}
| 2012– | Haiti | 4 | (0) |
- * Club domestic league appearances and goals as of 5 June 2018 ‡ National team caps and goals as of 5 June 2018

Jean-Francois James is a Haitian footballer who plays as a striker for the Haiti national team.
