= Kevin Mérida =

Guatemalan footballer

Personal information
- Full name: Kevin Josue Mérida Lam
- Date of birth: 18 November 1994 (age 31)
- Place of birth: San Marcos, Guatemala
- Position: Forward

Team information
- Current team: Marquense

Senior career*
Years	Team	Apps	(Gls)
2011–	Marquense	79	(9)

International career
2010–2011	Guatemala U17	4	(0)
2012–2013	Guatemala U20	4	(0)
2014	Guatemala	2	(0)
- * Club domestic league appearances and goals as of 11:10, 3 October 2015 (UTC)

Kevin Mérida (born 18 November 1994) is a Guatemalan professional footballer who plays as a forward for Primera División de Ascenso club Sacachispas.
