= Jair Minors =

Bermudian footballer (born 1994)

Personal information
- Date of birth: 31 May 1994 (age 32)
- Place of birth: Hamilton, Bermuda
- Height: 5 ft 9 in (1.75 m)
- Position: Forward

Team information
- Current team: Saint Louis Billikens
- Number: 17

College career
Years	Team	Apps	(Gls)
2012–2016	Saint Louis Billikens	52	(4)

Senior career*
Years	Team	Apps	(Gls)
2010–2011	Bermuda Hogges	0	(0)

International career^{‡}
2011	Bermuda U17	5	(1)
2011–2013	Bermuda U20	4	(0)
2016–	Bermuda	1	(0)
- * Club domestic league appearances and goals ‡ National team caps and goals as of 18 August 2016

Jair Minors (born 31 May 1994) is a Bermudian footballer who plays as a forward for the Saint Louis Billikens and the Bermuda national team.

== Youth career ==
In 2012, Jair Minors began play for the Saint Louis Billikens of the Atlantic 10 Conference. Since his freshman year in 2012, Minors has appeared in 35 games and has scored four goals in those games as a forward. Jair is currently in his senior year for the Billikens. He has been a solid performer for the Billikens due to, "elite speed", according to coach Mike McGinty.

== Club career ==
In 2010 and 2011, Minors played soccer for the Bermuda Hogges of the Premier Developmental League where he played mainly as a forward and midfielder.

== International career ==
Minors has capped multiple times for youth Bermuda national teams, U17 and U20, dating back to 2011. In 2016, he made his international debut for the Bermuda national team where he started and played 60 minutes in a 3–0 friendly loss to St. Kitts and Nevis national football team.
