= Jonathan Ruiz (footballer, born 1995) =

Aruban footballer

Personal information
- Date of birth: 1 June 1995 (age 31)
- Place of birth: Aruba
- Position: Midfielder

Team information
- Current team: SV Britannia

International career^{‡}
Years	Team	Apps	(Gls)
2015	Aruba U20	3	(0)
2015–	Aruba	8	(0)
- ‡ National team caps and goals as of 21:31, 4 January 2023 (UTC)

Jonathan Ruiz (born 1 June 1995) is an Aruban international football player.
