= Liandro Martis =

Curaçaoan footballer (born 1995)

Personal information
- Full name: Liandro Rudwendry Filipe Martis
- Date of birth: 13 November 1995 (age 31)
- Place of birth: Juan Domingo, Curaçao
- Height: 1.74 m (5 ft 9 in)
- Position: Winger

Team information
- Current team: SteDoCo

Youth career
- –2012: RKSV Scherpenheuvel
- 2012–2014: Feyenoord

Senior career*
Years	Team	Apps	(Gls)
2014–2015	Willem II	0	(0)
2016–2019	Leicester City	0	(0)
2019	Macclesfield Town	6	(0)
2020–2021	Onisilos Sotira 2014	29	(2)
2021–2022	Montana	28	(4)
2022–2023	Spartak Varna	8	(0)
2025–	SteDoCo	0	(0)

International career
2010	Netherlands Antilles U17	2	(2)
2012–2013	Curaçao U20	5	(1)
2012	Curaçao	1	(0)
- * Club domestic league appearances and goals as of 15 January 2026

Liandro Rudwendry Filipe Martis (born 13 November 1995) is a Curaçaoan professional footballer who plays as a winger for Vierde Divisie club SteDoCo.

== Club career ==
Following trials with Buxton, Tranmere Rovers and Oldham Athletic, Martis went on trial with Manchester United at the end of July 2016.

In August 2016, Martis signed a contract with Leicester City. In January 2019 he signed for Macclesfield Town on a short-term deal, but was released at the end of the season. In June 2022, he joined Spartak Varna on a two-year contract.

== International career ==
Martis made his international debut for Curaçao as a 16 year old against Aruba in a 3-2 friendly defeat on 14 July 2012.

== Career statistics ==
As of match played 14 July 2012

National team	Year	Apps	Goals
Curaçao	2012	1	0
Total		1	0
