= Jean Scott (football) =

Costa Rican football player (born 1994)

Personal information
- Full name: Jean Andrés Scott Hernández
- Date of birth: 14 March 1994 (age 32)
- Place of birth: Heredia, Heredia, Costa Rica
- Height: 1.78 m (5 ft 10 in)
- Position: Forward

Senior career*
Years	Team	Apps	(Gls)
2013–2016	Herediano	6	(0)
2013	→ Belén F.C. (loan)	9	(0)
2014–2015	→ AD Juventud Escazuceña (loan)		
2016	Santos de Guápiles	11	(1)
2016–2017	Liberia	33	(6)
2017–2018	Sporting San José	0	(0)
2018–2019	Siquinalá	9	(2)
2019	Guadalupe	14	(3)
2019	Cartaginés	16	(1)
2020–21	Sporting San José	12	(2)

International career
2019–	Costa Rica	1	(0)
- * Club domestic league appearances and goals

Jean Scott (born 14 March 1994) is a Costa Rican footballer who last played as a forward for Sporting San Jose.

== Career ==
Scott enjoyed a close relationship with the Uruguayan football manager Orlando de León who gave him his first chances in football at Herediano in 2013 and whom he also joined in 2016 at Liberia. Scott joined Guadalupe F.C. in January 2019. After joining Sporting F.C. Scott was named in the league team of the season at the end of the 2019-20 campaign as his club finished top of the Segunda División de Costa Rica.

== International career ==
Scott made his debut for the senior Costa Rica national team at the Avaya Stadium on 2 February 2019 against the USMNT.
