= Reid Strain =

Puerto Rican footballer

Personal information
- Full name: Reid A. Strain Torres
- Date of birth: January 19, 1994 (age 32)
- Place of birth: Milwaukee, Wisconsin, United States
- Height: 1.83 m (6 ft 0 in)
- Position: Forward

Team information
- Current team: Friska Viljor

College career
Years	Team	Apps	(Gls)
2012–2013	Indianapolis Greyhounds	39	(8)

Senior career*
Years	Team	Apps	(Gls)
2014–2015	Generación Saprissa		
2015–2017	Aserrí		
2018	Stöde	21	(7)
2019	Nordvärmland	6	(0)
2019	Örebro Syrianska	6	(0)
2020–	Friska Viljor	11	(1)

International career^{‡}
2013	Puerto Rico U20	8	(4)
2016	Puerto Rico	2	(0)
- * Club domestic league appearances and goals ‡ National team caps and goals as of 14:24, 19 January 2021 (UTC)

Reid A. Strain Torres (born January 19, 1994) is a Puerto Rican football player who currently plays as a forward for Friska Viljor.

== Career statistics ==
=== Club ===
As of 19 January 2021.

Club	Season	League			Cup		Other		Total	
Club	Season	Division	Apps	Goals	Apps	Goals	Apps	Goals	Apps	Goals
Stöde	2018	Division 3	21	7	0	0	0	0	21	7
Nordvärmland	2019	Division 2	6	0	0	0	0	0	6	0
Örebro Syrianska	2019	Division 2	6	0	0	0	0	0	6	0
Friska Viljor	2020	Division 2	11	1	0	0	0	0	11	1
Career total			44	8	0	0	0	0	44	8

=== International ===
As of matches played 19 January 2021.

National team	Year	Apps	Goals
Puerto Rico	2016	2	0
Total		2	0
