= Shuremy Felomina =

Curaçaoan professional footballer

Personal information
- Full name: Shuremy Emmanuel Felomina
- Date of birth: 4 March 1995 (age 31)
- Place of birth: Curaçao
- Height: 1.92 m (6 ft 4 in)
- Position: Centre-back

Team information
- Current team: Esperanza Pelt

Youth career
- CRKSV Jong Holland
- FC Den Bosch

Senior career*
Years	Team	Apps	(Gls)
2014–2015	FC Den Bosch	0	(0)
2015–2016	LONGA		
2016	Houtvenne		
2016–2017	Gestel		
2017	Houtvenne		
2017–2018	Achilles '29	16	(1)
2018	Kozakken Boys	10	(1)
2018–2020	Lienden	39	(1)
2020	DUNO	3	(0)
2020–2022	Real Lunet		
2022–	Esperanza Pelt		

International career
2010	Curaçao U17	1	(0)
2012	Curaçao U20	8	(0)
2013	Curaçao	3	(0)
- * Club domestic league appearances and goals as of 22:28, 19 August 2020 (UTC)

Shuremy Felomina (born 4 March 1995) is a Curaçaoan professional footballer who plays as a centre-back for Esperanza Pelt in Belgium.
