= J Prince =

Trinidadian musician (born 1986)

- Also known as: Omega Man
- Born: Joel Prince; 3 November 1986 (age 39); Mone Diablo, Trinidad and Tobago
- Genres: Christian music
- Occupations: Singer; Songwriter; Producer; Entrepreneur
- Years active: 2008–present
- Label: AfterTouch Music
- Website: www.jprinceultd.com

Joel Prince (born November 3, 1986), also known as J Prince, is a Trinidadian gospel Soca artiste and EDM producer. He is the founder and CEO of J Lab Productions, and a brand ambassador for Range Water.

He became popular in his home country and across the Caribbean for his music and stage antics, J Prince's music is tailored towards younger people, with messages of choosing good over evil.

== Life and career ==
Born and raised in Morne Diablo, a fishing village on the southern coast of Trinidad, Joel Prince started off his career as a disc jockey for a sound system company. Later a local radio station recruited him where he went by the name Omega Express. In 2008 he changed his name to J Prince and released his first single, "Victory" produced by G Master. The music video for the song went to number two on the Tempo's Cross-Caribbean secular countdown.

In 2011, J Prince and Flow Master Records released his first two albums, Omega - A New Beginning, and Renaissance. Since then, J Prince has shared the stage with Jah Cure, DJ Nicholas, Sherwin Gardner, Positive, and American rapper Flame.

Producer Roger Ryan signed J Prince to After Touch Music in 2016.

== Discography ==
- Om3ga: Krng (2018)
- Omega - New Beginning (2011)
- Renaissance (2011)
- Unlimited (2014)
- OM3GA:KRNG (2018)

== Awards and nominations ==
J Prince was nominated for 'Music Producer of the Year' by the Trinidad & Tobago Gospel Awards in 2011 and received multiple nominations in the 2014 Caribbean Gospel Music Marlin Awards held in The Bahamas including "Producer of the Year, Soca Recording of the Year", "Calypso Recording of the Year", "Adapted Contemporary Recording of the Year", "Dance Recording of the Year", "New Artist of the Year", and "Calypso-Soca Vocal Performance of the Year-Male". He and Sherwin Gardner shared the crown in the "Calypso-Soca Vocal Performance of the Year-Duo/Group" category in the same year.
