= Miguel Lemus =

Salvadoran footballer (born 1993)

Personal information
- Full name: Miguel Angel Lemus Ochoa
- Date of birth: 26 October 1993 (age 33)
- Place of birth: El Salvador
- Height: 1.67 m (5 ft 6 in)
- Position: Defender

Team information
- Current team: Isidro Metapan

Youth career
- 2010–2013: Turín FESA FC

Senior career*
Years	Team	Apps	(Gls)
2013–2017	CD FAS	33	(7)
2016	→ CD Chalatenango (loan)	37	(3)
2017	CD Luis Ángel Firpo	42	(6)
2018	CD Águila	35	(2)
2018–2022	AD Chalatenango	124	(14)
2023–Present	Isidro Metapan	20	(2)

International career^{‡}
2012–2013	El Salvador U-20		
2014	El Salvador U-21		
2014–	El Salvador	8	(0)
- * Club domestic league appearances and goals ‡ National team caps and goals as of 08:27, 25 March 2022 (UTC)

Miguel Angel Lemus Ochoa (born 26 October 1993) is a Salvadoran professional footballer.

== Club career ==
=== FAS ===
In December 2013, Lemus signed with FAS.

=== Loan to Chalatenango ===
Lemus signed with Chalatenango for the Clausura 2016.

=== Luis Ángel Firpo ===
Lemus signed with Luis Ángel Firpo for the Clausura 2017.

=== Águila ===
In January 2018, Lemus signed with Águila for the Clausura 2018.

=== Return to Chalatenango ===
In December 2018, Lemus signed again with Chalatenango for the Clausura 2019 tournament.
