= Gibrán Lajud =

Mexican footballer (born 1993)

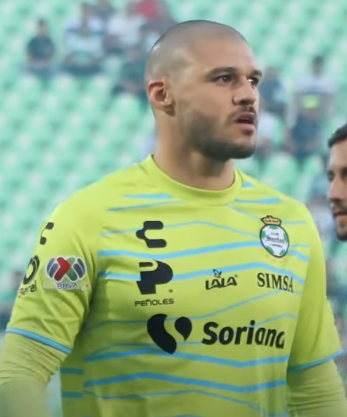
- Lajud with Santos Laguna in 2023

Personal information
- Full name: Manuel Gibrán Lajud Bojalil
- Date of birth: 25 December 1993 (age 32)
- Place of birth: Mexico City, Mexico
- Height: 1.85 m (6 ft 1 in)
- Position: Goalkeeper

Team information
- Current team: Atlético San Luis
- Number: 25

Youth career
- 2009–2013: Cruz Azul

Senior career*
Years	Team	Apps	(Gls)
2014–2015	Cruz Azul	0	(0)
2014–2015	→ Tijuana (loan)	1	(0)
2015–2020	Tijuana	125	(0)
2020–2024	Santos Laguna	19	(0)
2025	Guanacasteca	12	(0)
2025–	Atlético San Luis	13	(0)

International career
2013	Mexico U20	1	(0)
2014	Mexico U21	4	(0)
2015–2016	Mexico U23	23	(0)
2018	Mexico	1	(0)
Medal record
Men's football
Representing Mexico
Pan American Games
Silver medal – second place	2015 Toronto	Team
Olympic Qualifying Championship
Winner	2015 United States
- * Club domestic league appearances and goals as of 20 November 2026

Manuel Gibrán Lajud Bojalil (born 25 December 1993) is a Mexican professional footballer who plays as a goalkeeper for Liga MX club Atlético San Luis.

== Club career ==
=== Early career ===
Lajud joined the youth academy of Cruz Azul in 2009, and made his way up the ranks through the academy, playing for the under-17 and under-20 squads. He was called up to the first team.

=== Tijuana ===
Lajud joined Tijuana on loan for the 2014–15 season. On 26 July 2014, he made his professional debut against América. He came on as a substitute for the injured Cirilo Saucedo in the 73rd minute.

After the retirement of Federico Vilar, Lajud was named the starting goalkeeper for Tijuana.

=== Santos Laguna ===
On 10 July 2020, Lajud joined Santos Laguna.

=== Guanacasteca ===
In December 2024, ahead of the 2025 season, Lajud signed with Costa Rican Liga FPD side A.D. Guanacasteca.

== International career ==
=== Mexico ===
Lajud was called up to the senior Mexico squad for a friendly against Bosnia and Herzegovina in January 2018. He did not appear in the match. He made his debut for Mexico in a 3–2 friendly win over Costa Rica on 10 December the same year.

=== Lebanon ===
During the 2022 FIFA World Cup qualification, the Lebanese Football Association attempted to include Lajud to play for Lebanon, after Lebanon qualified for the third round. However, Lajud had yet to complete the FIFA one-time switch requirement in order to join the Lebanon national football team.

== Personal life ==
Lajud is of Lebanese descent. He received his Lebanese passport on 6 November 2021.

== Career statistics ==
=== Club ===
As of match played 20 November 2026

Appearances and goals by club, season and competition
Club	Season	League			National cup		Continental		Other		Total	
Club	Season	Division	Apps	Goals	Apps	Goals	Apps	Goals	Apps	Goals	Apps	Goals
Tijuana (loan)	2014–15	Liga MX	1	0	12	0	—		—		13	0
Tijuana	2015–16	Liga MX	4	0	14	0	—		—		18	0
Tijuana	2016–17	Liga MX	21	0	4	0	—		—		25	0
Tijuana	2017–18	Liga MX	38	0	1	0	4 (Note: Appearances in CONCACAF Champions League)	0	—		43	0
Tijuana	2018–19	Liga MX	35	0	3	0	—		—		38	0
Tijuana	2019–20	Liga MX	27	0	—		—		1 (Note: Appearances in Leagues Cup)	0	28	0
Tijuana	Total		125	0	34	0	4	0	1	0	164	0
Santos Laguna	2021–22	Liga MX	8	0	—		—		2	0	10	0
Santos Laguna	2022–23	Liga MX	2	0	2 (Note: Appearances in Copa GNP por México)	0	—		—		4	0
Santos Laguna	2023–24	Liga MX	9	0	—		—		2	0	11	0
Santos Laguna	Total		19	0	2	0	—		4	0	25	0
Guanacasteca	2024–25	Liga FPD	12	0	—		—		—		12	0
Atlético San Luis	2025–26	Liga MX	2	0	—		—		—		2	0
Atlético San Luis	2026–27	Liga MX	11	0	—		—		1	0	12	0
Atlético San Luis	Total		13	0	—		—		1	0	14	0
Career total			170	0	36	0	4	0	6	0	216	0

=== International ===
Appearances and goals by national team and year
National team	Year	Apps	Goals
Mexico	2018	1	0
Total		1	0

== Honours ==
Mexico Youth

- CONCACAF U-20 Championship: 2013
- Central American and Caribbean Games: 2014
- CONCACAF Olympic Qualifying Championship: 2015
- Pan American Silver Medal: 2015

Individual

- CONCACAF Olympic Qualifying Championship Best XI: 2015
- CONCACAF Olympic Qualifying Championship Golden Glove: 2015
