= Elvis Thomas (footballer, born 1994) =

Antigua and Barbudan footballer

Personal information
- Full name: Elvis Thomas
- Date of birth: 2 June 1994 (age 32)
- Place of birth: Antigua and Barbuda
- Height: 1.76 m (5 ft 9 in)
- Position: Forward

Team information
- Current team: Caledonia AIA
- Number: 14

Youth career
- 2007–2011: SAP

Senior career*
Years	Team	Apps	(Gls)
2011	Antigua Barracuda FC	5	(1)
2013	Caledonia AIA	3	(0)
2013–2017	Grenades		
2017–2018	Aston Villa St. John's		

International career^{‡}
2010	Antigua and Barbuda U17	3	(5)
2010–2012	Antigua and Barbuda U20	9	(6)
2011	Antigua and Barbuda U23	3	(1)
2011–	Antigua and Barbuda	4	(0)
- * Club domestic league appearances and goals as of 15 July 2020 ‡ National team caps and goals as of 15 July 2020

Elvis Thomas (born 6 June 1994) is an Antiguan footballer.

== Club career ==
Thomas made his professional debut for Antigua Barracuda FC on April 17, 2011, in a 2–1 loss to the Los Angeles Blues.

== International career ==
Thomas is an Antiguan youth international, having played for both the Antigua and Barbuda U-17 and U-20 national teams.
