= Miguel Ramírez (Dominican footballer) =

Dominican footballer

Personal information
- Full name: Miguel de Jesús Ramírez
- Date of birth: 16 March 1994 (age 32)
- Place of birth: San Cristóbal, Dominican Republic
- Height: 1.57 m (5 ft 2 in)
- Positions: Forward; winger

Team information
- Current team: Moca

Youth career
- Pueblo Nuevo FC
- Bauger

Senior career*
Years	Team	Apps	(Gls)
2011–2015	Bauger		
2012	→ Barcelona FC (loan)		
2016	Cibao		
2017–	Moca		

International career^{‡}
2010	Dominican Republic U17	3	(1)
2012	Dominican Republic U20	3	(2)
2015–	Dominican Republic	1	(0)
- * Club domestic league appearances and goals as of 13:43, 3 October 2015 (UTC) ‡ National team caps and goals as of 13:43, 3 October 2015 (UTC)

Miguel de Jesús Ramírez (born 16 March 1994), nicknamed Mon, is a Dominican international footballer who plays for Moca FC as a forward.
