= Justin Simons =

Panamanian footballer (born 1997)

Personal information
- Full name: Justin Alberto Simons Samaniego
- Date of birth: 19 September 1997 (age 29)
- Place of birth: Panama City, Panama
- Height: 1.72 m (5 ft 8 in)
- Position: Midfielder

Team information
- Current team: Tauro

Senior career*
Years	Team	Apps	(Gls)
2013–2018	San Francisco	62	(3)
2018–	Tauro	62	(4)

International career^{‡}
2015–2017	Panama U20	6	(0)
2015	Panama U23	2	(0)
2016–	Panama	1	(0)
- * Club domestic league appearances and goals as of 05:34, 27 July 2021 (UTC) ‡ National team caps and goals as of 13:55, 4 March 2021 (UTC)

Justin Alberto Simons Samaniego (born 19 September 1997) is a Panamanian professional footballer who plays as a midfielder for Tauro and the Panama national team.
