= Daniel Luis Sáez =

Cuban footballer (born 1994)

Daniel Luis
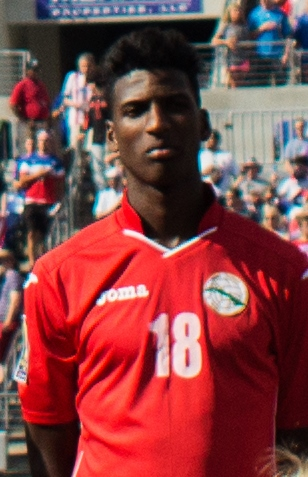
- Luis lining up for Cuba at the 2015 CONCACAF Gold Cup

Personal information
- Full name: Daniel Eduardo Luis Sáez
- Date of birth: 11 May 1994 (age 32)
- Place of birth: Havana, Cuba
- Height: 1.95 m (6 ft 5 in)
- Position: Midfielder

Senior career*
| Years | Team | Apps | (Gls) |
| 2012–2017 | La Habana | | |
| 2017–2018 | Camagüey | | |
| 2018–2019 | Atlántico | | |
| 2019 | La Habana | | |
| 2019 | Delfines del Este | | |
| 2020–2021 | PDX FC | 4 | (0) |
| 2022 | Rio Grande Valley FC | 8 | (2) |

International career
- Cuba U17
- Cuba U20
- Cuba U23
| 2012–2019 | Cuba | 19 | (1) |
- * Club domestic league appearances and goals as of 22:24, 21 October 2022 (UTC)

Daniel Eduardo Luis Sáez (born 11 May 1994), known as Daniel Luis, is a Cuban footballer.

== Club career ==
A tall central midfielder, Luis has played primarily for his hometown team La Habana, except for a stint at Camagüey in 2017.

On 9 March 2022, Lios signed with USL Championship side Rio Grande Valley FC.

== International career ==
Luis played in three games at the 2013 FIFA U-20 World Cup, but had made his senior international debut for Cuba already in an October 2012 FIFA World Cup qualification match against Panama when he came on as a very late substitute for Ariel Martinez. He has, as of January 2018, earned a total of 12 caps, scoring 1 goal.

Luis took part in the CONCACAF Olympic qualifying tournament in Antigua and Barbuda. He was named in the Cuba squad for the 2015 CONCACAF Gold Cup but missed the first game against Mexico due to US visa complications.

On 21 June 2019, after Cuba's second match at the 2019 CONCACAF Gold Cup, Luis along two other teammates defected.

=== International goals ===
Scores and results list Cuba's goal tally first.

| Goal | Date | Venue | Opponent | Score | Result | Competition |
|---|---|---|---|---|---|---|
| 1. | 22 March 2016 | Estadio Pedro Marrero, Havana, Cuba | Bermuda | 2–0 | 2–1 | 2017 Caribbean Cup qualification |
