= Aricheell Hernández =

Cuban footballer (born 1993)

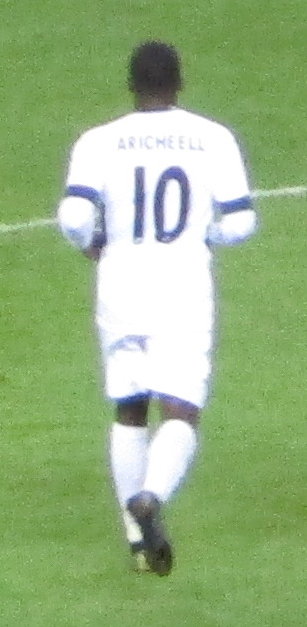
- Hernández with Cuba in 2019

Personal information
- Full name: Aricheell Hernández Mora
- Date of birth: 20 September 1993 (age 33)
- Place of birth: Zulueta, Remedios, Cuba
- Height: 1.69 m (5 ft 7 in)
- Position: Midfielder

Team information
- Current team: LA Firpo
- Number: 20

Senior career*
Years	Team	Apps	(Gls)
2012–2017	Villa Clara		(20)
2017–2018	Independiente	14	(1)
2018	Pinar del Río		(1)
2019	Villa Clara		(5)
2019–2022	O&M	46	(17)
2023	Mixco	14	(2)
2024–2024	Atlético Pantoja	33	(8)
2024-25	Atlético Vega Real	4	(0)
2025-	LA Firpo	6	(1)

International career^{‡}
2012–2013	Cuba U20	14	(5)
2014	Cuba U21	3	(1)
2012–2015	Cuba U23	6	(2)
2012–	Cuba	36	(8)
- * Club domestic league appearances and goals as of 19 June 2022 ‡ National team caps and goals as of 2 July 2023

Aricheell Hernández Mora (born 20 September 1993) is a Cuban professional footballer who plays as a midfielder for Primera División club LA Firpo and captains the Cuba national team.

== Club career ==
Hernández played for his provincial team Villa Clara and was allowed by the Cuban Football Federation to move abroad to join Panamanian side Independiente de la Chorrera in September 2017.

== International career ==
Hernández participated in the 2014 Central American and Caribbean Games and the 2012 CONCACAF Men's Olympic Qualifying Tournament.

He made his senior debut on 22 February 2012 against Jamaica in an international friendly and has, as of January 2018, earned a total of 11 caps, scoring no goals. He represented his country in 2 FIFA World Cup qualification matches and played at the 2013 FIFA U-20 World Cup.

He was called up to the 2015 CONCACAF Gold Cup by Cuba but was unable to take part in the competition due to not being able to acquire a US visa. He and several others of the Cuban national under-23 football team had been in Antigua playing in the Caribbean section of the 2015 CONCACAF Men's Olympic Qualifying Championship qualification tournament and there had been administrative complications.

=== International goals ===
Scores and results list Cuba's goal tally first.

No.	Date	Venue	Opponent	Score	Result	Competition
1.	29 September 2018	Estadio Pedro Marrero, Havana, Cuba	Cayman Islands	2–0	5–0	Friendly
2.	27 February 2019	Estadio Pedro Marrero, Havana, Cuba	Bermuda	2–0	5–0	Friendly
3.	27 February 2019	Estadio Pedro Marrero, Havana, Cuba	Bermuda	3–0	5–0	Friendly
4.	5 June 2022	Estadio Antonio Maceo, Santiago de Cuba, Cuba	Barbados	2–0	3–0	2022–23 CONCACAF Nations League B
5.	12 June 2022	Estadio Antonio Maceo, Santiago de Cuba, Cuba	Antigua and Barbuda	1–0	3–1	2022–23 CONCACAF Nations League B
6.	12 June 2022	Estadio Antonio Maceo, Santiago de Cuba, Cuba	Antigua and Barbuda	2–0	3–1	2022–23 CONCACAF Nations League B
7.	12 June 2022	Estadio Antonio Maceo, Santiago de Cuba, Cuba	Antigua and Barbuda	3–1	3–1	2022–23 CONCACAF Nations League B
8.	1 July 2023	Shell Energy Stadium, Houston, United States	Guadeloupe	1–4	1–4	2023 CONCACAF Gold Cup
