= Dairon Pérez =

Cuban footballer (born 1994)

Personal information
- Full name: Dairon Manuel Pérez Pérez
- Date of birth: 7 January 1994 (age 32)
- Place of birth: Havana, Cuba
- Height: 1.67 m (5 ft 6 in)
- Position: Striker

Senior career*
Years	Team	Apps	(Gls)
–2015	La Habana		

International career^{‡}
2015	Cuba	2	(0)
- * Club domestic league appearances and goals ‡ National team caps and goals as of 1 January 2018

Dairon Manuel Pérez Pérez (born 7 January 1994) is a Cuban international football player.

== International career ==
Pérez played three matches for the Cuba U-20's at the 2013 FIFA U-20 World Cup in Turkey.

He made his senior international debut versus Jamaica in a March 2015 friendly match. He defected with teammates Emmanuel Labrada, Frank López and Yendry Torres to the United States in October 2015 during the 2015 CONCACAF Men's Olympic Qualifying Championship.
