= 2015 in American soccer =

Soccer in the United States
- Season: 2015

Men's soccer
- Supporters' Shield: New York Red Bulls
- NASL: New York Cosmos
- USL: Rochester Rhinos
- NPSL: New York Cosmos B
- PDL: (Canada) K-W United FC
- US Open Cup: Sporting Kansas City
- MLS Cup: Portland Timbers

Women's soccer
- NWSL: FC Kansas City
- W-League: Washington Spirit Reserves
- WPSL: Chicago Red Stars Reserves

The 2015 season was the 103rd season of competitive soccer in the United States.

== National teams ==
=== Men ===
==== Senior ====
| Wins | Losses | Draws |
|---|---|---|
| 10 | 6 | 4 |

===== Friendlies =====
| January 28 | Chile | 3–2 | United States | Rancagua, Chile |
| 17:00 EST UTC−05:00 | Gutiérrez 10'; Rojas (yellow card) 43'; González 66', 75' | Report | Shea 6', (yellow card) 88'; Altidore 31'; Bradley (yellow card) 36'; Wood (yellow card) 45+2'; Nguyen (yellow card) 50'; Jones (yellow card) 52'; Besler (yellow card) 71' | Stadium: Estadio El Teniente; Attendance: 12,420; Referee: Patricio Loustau (Argentina) |

| February 8 | United States | 2–0 | Panama | Carson, United States |
| 16:00 EST UTC−05:00 | Bradley 27'; Dempsey 37'; Bradley (yellow card) 38'; Wondolowski (yellow card) 65' | Report | Ovalle (yellow card) 40'; Godoy (yellow card) 59' | Stadium: StubHub Center; Attendance: 20,271; Referee: Henry Bejarano (Costa Rica) |

| March 25 | Denmark | 3–2 | United States | Aarhus, Denmark |
| 15:00 EST UTC−05:00 | Kvist (yellow card) 25'; Bendtner 33', 83', 90+1' | Report | Altidore 19', (yellow card) 78'; Jóhannsson 66'; Alvarado (yellow card) 89' | Stadium: Atletion; Attendance: 10,505; Referee: Mattias Gestranius (Finland) |

| March 31 | Switzerland | 1–1 | United States | Zürich, Switzerland |
| 12:00 ET | Stocker 80' | Report | Shea 45'; Altidore (yellow card) 68' (red card) 68' | Stadium: Stadion Letzigrund; Attendance: 16,100; Referee: Luca Banti (Italy) |

| April 15 | United States | 2–0 | Mexico | San Antonio, United States |
| 19:30 CT | Morris 49'; Agudelo 72' | Report | | Stadium: Alamodome; Attendance: 64,369; Referee: Ricardo Montero (Costa Rica) |

| June 5 | Netherlands | 3–4 | United States | Amsterdam, Netherlands |
| 14:30 ET | Huntelaar 27', 49'; Depay 53' | Report | Zardes 33'; Brooks 70'; Williams 89'; Wood 90' | Stadium: Amsterdam Arena; Attendance: 46,000; Referee: Martin Strömbergsson (Sweden) |

| June 10 | Germany | 1–2 | United States | Cologne, Germany |
| 14:45 ET | Götze 12' | Report | Diskerud 41'; Wood 87' | Stadium: RheinEnergieStadion; Attendance: 40,348; Referee: Danny Makkelie (Netherlands) |

| July 3 | United States | 4–0 | Guatemala | Nashville, United States |
| 17:30 CT | Castrillo 19' (o.g.); Chandler 58'; Dempsey 72' (pen.); Wondolowski 86' | Report | | Stadium: LP Field; Attendance: 44,835; Referee: Jorge Pérez (Mexico) |

| September 4 | United States | 2–1 | Peru | Washington, United States |
| 19:00 ET | Altidore 59', 68' | Report | Chávez 20' | Stadium: RFK Stadium; Attendance: 28,896; Referee: Francisco Chacón (Mexico) |

| September 8 | United States | 1–4 | Brazil | Foxborough, United States |
| 20:00 ET | Williams 90+1' | Report | Hulk 9'; Neymar 51' (pen.), 67'; Rafinha 64' | Stadium: Gillette Stadium; Attendance: 29,308; Referee: Joel Aguilar (El Salvador) |

| October 13 | United States | 0–1 | Costa Rica | Harrison, United States |
| 18:30 ET | | Report | Campbell 70' | Stadium: Red Bull Arena; Attendance: 9,214; Referee: Walter López (Guatemala) |

===== CONCACAF Gold Cup =====
| July 7 Group stage | United States | 2–1 | Honduras | Frisco, United States |
| 19:30 ET | Dempsey 25', 64' | Report | Discua 69' | Stadium: Toyota Stadium; Attendance: 22,357; Referee: César Ramos (Mexico) |

| July 10 Group stage | United States | 1–0 | Haiti | Foxborough, United States |
| 20:30 ET | Dempsey 47' | Report | | Stadium: Gillette Stadium; Attendance: 46,720; Referee: Ricardo Montero (Costa Rica) |

| July 13 Group stage | Panama | 1–1 | United States | Kansas City, United States |
| 21:30 ET | Pérez 34' | Report | Bradley 55' | Stadium: Sporting Park; Attendance: 18,467; Referee: Roberto García (Mexico) |

| July 18 Quarter-final | United States | 6–0 | Cuba | Baltimore, United States |
| 17:00 ET | Dempsey 4', 64' (pen.), 78'; Zardes 15'; Jóhannsson 32'; Gonzalez 45' | Report | | Stadium: M&T Bank Stadium; Attendance: 37,994; Referee: Henry Bejarano (Costa Rica) |

| July 22 Semifinal | United States | 1–2 | Jamaica | Atlanta, United States |
| 18:00 ET | Bradley 48' | Report | Mattocks 31'; Barnes 36' | Stadium: Georgia Dome; Attendance: 70,511; Referee: Ricardo Montero (Costa Rica) |

| July 25 Third place playoff | United States | 1–1 (2–3 p) | Panama | Chester, United States |
| 16:00 ET | Dempsey 70' | Report | Nurse 55' | Stadium: PPL Park; Attendance: 12,598; Referee: Óscar Moncada (Honduras) |
| | Penalties |
| | Jóhannsson (penalty scored); Dempsey (penalty scored); Johnson (penalty missed); Bradley (penalty missed); Beasley (penalty missed) | | (penalty scored) R. Torres; (penalty scored) Arroyo; (penalty missed) Cooper; (penalty scored) Cummings |

===== 2015 CONCACAF Cup (2017 FIFA Confederations Cup play-off) =====
| October 10 | Mexico | 3–2 (a.e.t.) | United States | Pasadena, United States |
| 18:30 PDT | Hernández 10'; Peralta 96'; Aguilar 118' | Report | Cameron 15'; Wood 108' | Stadium: Rose Bowl; Attendance: 93,723; Referee: Joel Aguilar (El Salvador) |

===== 2018 FIFA World Cup qualification =====
| November 13 Fourth round | United States | 6–1 | Saint Vincent and the Grenadines | St. Louis, United States |
| 18:10 UTC−6 | Wood 11'; Johnson 29'; Altidore 31'; Cameron 51', 74'; Zardes 58' | Report | Anderson 5' | Stadium: Busch Stadium; Attendance: 43,433; Referee: Jeffrey Solís (Costa Rica) |

| November 17 Fourth round | Trinidad and Tobago | 0–0 | United States | Port of Spain, Trinidad and Tobago |
| 19:00 UTC−4 | | Report | | Stadium: Hasely Crawford Stadium; Referee: César Ramos (Mexico) |

===== Goalscorers =====
| Player | Goals |
|---|---|
| Clint Dempsey | 9 |
| Jozy Altidore | 6 |
| Brek Shea | 2 |
| Bobby Wood | 4 |
| Aron Jóhannsson | 2 |
| Gyasi Zardes | 3 |
| Michael Bradley | 3 |
| Jordan Morris | 1 |
| Juan Agudelo | 1 |
| John Brooks | 1 |
| Danny Williams | 2 |
| Mix Diskerud | 1 |
| Timothy Chandler | 1 |
| Chris Wondolowski | 1 |
| Omar Gonzalez | 1 |
| Danny Williams | 1 |
| Own Goals | 1 |

==== Under-23 ====
===== Friendlies =====
| March 27 | Bosnia and Herzegovina | 2–5 | United States | Tuzla, Bosnia and Herzegovina |
| 11:00 ET | Jelišić 64'; Radovac (yellow card) 65'; Hodžić 72' (pen.); Memiia (yellow card) 73' | Report | Morris 8'; Rodriguez 14'; Okwuonu (yellow card) 55'; Alashe (yellow card) 63'; Joya 66' (pen.), (yellow card) 71'; Hernández 78'; Alashe 86' | Stadium: Stadion Tušanj; Attendance: 800; Referee: Edin Jakupovic (Bosnia and Herzegovina) |

| March 31 | Denmark | 1–0 | United States | Copenhagen, Denmark |
| 14:00 ET | Brock-Madsen (yellow card) 43'; Cornelius 52', (yellow card) 52' | Report | Hernández (yellow card) 38'; Sorto (yellow card) 88'; Gil (yellow card) 90+3' | Stadium: Lyngby Stadion; Attendance: 1,322; Referee: Petur Reinert (Faroe Islands) |

| April 22 | United States | 3–0 | Mexico | Carson, United States |
| 20:00 PT | Rodriguez (yellow card) 21', (goal) 48'; Alashe (yellow card) 38'; O'Neill (yellow card) 43'; Dean 58'; Morris 68'; Okwuonu (yellow card) 90+1' | Report | | Stadium: StubHub Center; Attendance: 3,782; Referee: David Gantar (Canada) |

| August 7 | United States | 3–1 | (Mexico) Club Tijuana U-23 | Carson, United States |
| 17:00 PT | Salcedo; Steeves; Vincent | Report | Juan Rodríguez | Stadium: National Training Center |

| September 3 | England | 1–0 | United States | Preston, England |
| 14:40 ET | Wilson 72' | Report | | Stadium: Deepdale; Referee: Alan Mario San (Malta) |

| September 8 | United States | 2–0 | Qatar | Bury, England |
| 13:00 ET | Joya 57' (pen.); Ariyibi 86' | Report | | Stadium: Gigg Lane; Referee: Bobby Madle (England) |

| November 11 | Brazil | 2–1 | United States | Recife, Brazil |
| 19:00 ET | Gabriel 42'; Luan 47' | Report | Kiesewetter 60' (pen.) | Stadium: Ilha do Retiro; Attendance: 10,777; Referee: Jorge Mancilla (Bolivia) |

===== Toulon Tournament =====
| May 27 Group stage | United States | 1–3 | France | Toulon, France |
| 13:00 ET | Kiesewetter (yellow card) 19'; Morris 65' | Report | Bahlouli 10'; Crivelli 11'; Sparagna 21', (yellow card) 49'; Kimpembe (yellow card) 38'; Badiger (yellow card) 54' | Stadium: Stade Léo Lagrange; Attendance: 812; Referee: Adi Zourak (Morocco) |

| May 29 Group stage | United States | 3–1 | Netherlands | Hyères, France |
| 11:00 ET | Kiesewetter 19'; Hernández 24'; Packwood 42'; Pelosi (yellow card) 69' | Report | Darri 10'; Vloet (yellow card) 80' | Stadium: Stade Perruc; Attendance: 550; Referee: Abou Coulibaly (Ivory Coast) |

| May 31 Group stage | United States | 1–2 | Costa Rica | Saint-Raphaël, France |
| 11:00 ET | Alashe 30' | Report | Matarrita 23'; Ramírez 54' | Stadium: Stade Louis Hon; Attendance: 550; Referee: Oscar Romo (Mexico) |

| June 2 Group stage | United States | 1–0 | Qatar | Aubagne, France |
| 12:00 ET | Green 8' | Report | | Stadium: Stade de Lattre-de-Tassigny; Attendance: 680; Referee: Fábio Verissimo (Portugal) |

| June 7 Third place match | United States | 2–1 | England | Toulon, France |
| 11:00 ET | Hernandez 7' (pen.); Joya 65' (pen.) | Report | Hause 10' | Stadium: Stade Mayol; Attendance: 910; Referee: Fábio Verissimo (Portugal) |

===== CONCACAF Olympic Qualifying Championship =====
| October 1 Group stage | United States | 3–1 | Canada | Kansas City, United States |
| 20:00 CDT | Morris 1', 73'; Gil 90+2' (pen.) | Report | Petrasso 81' | Stadium: Sporting Park; Attendance: 3,827; Referee: Armando Castro (Honduras) |

| October 3 Group stage | Cuba | 1–6 | United States | Kansas City, United States |
| 16:00 CDT | Sáez 90+3' | Report | Carter-Vickers 17'; Miazga 36'; Kiesewetter 38', 49'; Hyndman 69'; Hernández 76' | Stadium: Sporting Park; Attendance: 3,755; Referee: Juan Guerra (Guatemala) |

| October 6 Group stage | United States | 4–0 | Panama | Commerce City, United States |
| 19:30 MDT | Escobar 50' (o.g.); Kiesewetter 53'; Morris 56'; Gil 71' (pen.) | Report | | Stadium: Dick's Sporting Goods Park; Attendance: 3,313; Referee: Hugo Cruz (Costa Rica) |

| October 10 Semi-final | United States | 0–2 | Honduras | Sandy, United States |
| 13:00 MDT | | Report | Elis 24', 77' | Stadium: Rio Tinto Stadium; Referee: Jafeth Parea (Panama) |

| October 13 Third place playoff | United States | 2–0 | Canada | Sandy, United States |
| 17:00 MDT | Pelosi 69'; Kiesewetter 84' (pen.) | Report | | Stadium: Rio Tinto Stadium; Referee: Luis Enrique Santander (Mexico) |

==== Under-20 ====
===== CONCACAF U-20 Championship =====
| January 9 Group stage | United States | 1–1 | Guatemala | Kingston, Jamaica |
| 17:30 UTC−05:00 | Gall (yellow card) 52'; Carter-Vickers 59' | Report | Obregón (yellow card) 19'; Ruiz (yellow card) 53', (goal) 90' | Stadium: Independence Park; Attendance: 2,500; Referee: Henry Bejarano (Costa Rica) |

| January 11 Group stage | Panama | 1–0 | United States | Kingston, Jamaica |
| 17:30 UTC−05:00 | Galván (yellow card) 57'; Small 79' | Report | Perry-Acosta (yellow card) 73'; Gooch (yellow card) 82' | Stadium: Independence Park; Attendance: 3,320; Referee: Yadel Martínez (Cuba) |

| January 14 Group stage | United States | 8–0 | Aruba | Kingston, Jamaica |
| 17:30 UTC−05:00 | Gall 16', 23' (pen.), 32'; Jamieson IV 18', 48'; Thompson 26'; Hyndman 30'; Moreno 84' | Report | Homoet (yellow card) 36' | Stadium: Independence Park; Attendance: 2,000; Referee: Fernando Guerrero (Mexico) |

| January 18 Group stage | United States | 2–0 | Jamaica | Montego Bay, Jamaica |
| 20:00 UTC−05:00 | Gall 34' (pen.), 70' (pen.); Thompson (yellow card) 90+2' | Report | Brown (yellow card) 32'; Nelson (yellow card) 68'; Roberts (red card) 85'; Dyer (yellow card) 90+2' | Stadium: Montego Bay Sports Complex; Attendance: 3,500; Referee: Marlon Mejía (El Salvador) |

| January 21 Group stage | United States | 1–0 | Trinidad and Tobago | Montego Bay, Jamaica |
| 17:30 UTC−05:00 | Canouse (yellow card) 1'; Jamieson IV 78' | Report | Andrews (yellow card) 39'; Seecharan (yellow card) 85' | Stadium: Montego Bay Sports Complex; Attendance: 750; Referee: John Pitti (Panama) |

| January 24 Playoff stage | United States | 2–0 | El Salvador | Montego Bay, Jamaica |
| 17:00 UTC−05:00 | Spencer 37', (yellow card) 38'; Arriola 68'; Thompson (yellow card) 73'; Carter-Vickers (yellow card) 76' | Report | | Stadium: Montego Bay Sports Complex; Attendance: 1,000; Referee: Fernando Guerrero (Mexico) |

===== Friendlies =====
| March 27 | Tottenham Hotspur Academy (England) | 2–1 | United States | London, England |
| 7:00 ET | | Report | | Stadium: Tottenham Hotspur Training Centre |
Note: A full match report is not available for this closed door match.

| March 29 | England | 2–1 | United States | Plymouth, England |
| 11:00 ET | Swift 44'; Thomas 68'; Stephens (yellow card) 81' | Report | Tall 74'; Yomba (yellow card) 82' | Stadium: Home Park; Attendance: 11,406; Referee: Steve Martin (England) |

| April 21 | United States | 2–2 | Qatar | Salzburg, Austria |
| 10:00 ET | Moreno 22'; Roldan (yellow card) 77'; Donovan 84' | Report | Al-Saadi 46'; Hassunin (yellow card) 63'; Sulaiman 75' | Stadium: Red Bull Salzburg Academy; Attendance: 0 |

| April 25 | United States | 1–0 | Croatia | Salzburg, Austria |
| 10:00 ET | Carter-Vickers (yellow card) 15'; Palmer-Brown (yellow card) 17'; Gall 66'; Requejo (yellow card) 90' | Report | Cvek (yellow card) 22'; Jeronim (yellow card) 74' | Stadium: Red Bull Salzburg Academy; Attendance: 0 |

| May 19 | Australia | 1–2 | United States | Gosford, Australia |
| 4:00 ET | Mauk 15' | Report | Soñora 60'; Tall 61' | Stadium: Central Coast Stadium; Attendance: 600; Referee: Chris Young |

===== FIFA U-20 World Cup =====
| May 30 Group stage | United States | 2–1 | Myanmar | Whangārei, New Zealand |
| 16:00 UTC+12 | Tall 17'; Hyndman 56'; Moore (yellow card) 62' | Report | Nanda Kyaw (yellow card) 5'; Yan Naing Oo 9' | Stadium: Northland Events Centre; Attendance: 5,816; Referee: Bernard Camille (Seychelles) |

| June 2 Group stage | New Zealand | 0–4 | United States | Auckland, New Zealand |
| 19:00 UTC+12 | Lewis (yellow card) 21'; Dyer (yellow card) 31' | Report | Rubin 6', 83'; Miazga (yellow card) 26'; Payne (yellow card) 29'; Hyndman 33'; Arriola 58' | Stadium: North Harbour Stadium; Attendance: 15,678; Referee: Antonio Mateu Lahoz (Spain) |

| June 5 Group stage | Ukraine | 3–0 | United States | Auckland, New Zealand |
| 19:00 UTC+12 | Kovalenko 56', 74', 79' | Report | | Stadium: North Harbour Stadium; Attendance: 7,694; Referee: Eric Otogo-Castane (Gabon) |

| June 10 Round of 16 | United States | 1–0 | Colombia | Wellington, New Zealand |
| 19:30 (UTC+12) | Rubin 58' | Report | | Stadium: Wellington Regional Stadium; Attendance: 6,062; Referee: Ivan Bebek (Croatia) |

| June 14 Quarter-finals | United States | 0–0 (a.e.t.) (5–6 p) | Serbia | Auckland, New Zealand |
| 16:30 (UTC+12) | | Report | | Stadium: North Harbour Stadium; Attendance: 10,826; Referee: Artur Soares Dias (Portugal) |
| | Penalties |
| | Rubin (penalty missed); Payne (penalty scored); Arriola (penalty scored); Hyndman (penalty scored); Zelalem (penalty scored); Soñora (penalty missed); Delgado (penalty scored); Carter-Vickers (penalty missed); Requejo (penalty missed) | | (penalty scored) Zdjelar; (penalty missed) Mandić; (penalty scored) Babić; (penalty scored) Grujić; (penalty scored) Živković; (penalty missed) Rajković; (penalty scored) Antonov; (penalty missed) Veljković; (penalty scored) Maksimović |

===== Stevan Vilotic Tournament =====
| September 3 | Serbia | 3–1 | United States | Subotica, Serbia |
| 11:00 ET | Jović 21'; Šaponjić 67', 78' | Report | Scott 70' (pen.) | Stadium: Subotica City Stadium; Attendance: 400; Referee: Slavisa Radovanovic |

| September 4 | France | 6–1 | United States | Senta, Serbia |
| 11:00 ET | Jamrozik 8'; Puel 12'; Ayé 19', 45+1', 88'; Augustin 83' | Report | Sabbi 90+1' | Stadium: FK Senta Stadium; Attendance: 150; Referee: Aleksandar Vasic |

| September 7 | United States | 2–0 | Israel | Bačka Topola, Serbia |
| 9:30 ET | Nachmias 4' (o.g.); Saucedo 39' | Report | | Stadium: FK Bačka Topola; Attendance: 200; Referee: Nemanja Gajdobranski |

===== Four Nations Tournament =====
| October 6 | Germany | 8–1 | United States | Stuttgart, Germany |
| 12:00 ET | Besuschkow 38'; Ochs 40'; Bunjaki 63', 68', 73'; Putaro 65'; Endres 79'; Bitter 87' | Report | Williamson 84' | Stadium: Gazi-Stadion auf der Waldau; Attendance: 800; Referee: Alexander Harkam |

| October 9 | United States | 2–2 | Scotland | Reutlingen, Germany |
| 6:00 ET | Sabbi 16'; Akale 21' | Report | Wright 15'; Kiltie 69' | Stadium: Stadion an der Kreuzeiche; Attendance: 400; Referee: Bart Vetrtrenten |

| October 12 | United States | 3–3 | Mexico | Stuttgart, Germany |
| 6:00 ET | Sabbi 18'; Akale 51', 90+4' (pen.) | Report | Aguilar 9'; Duran 77'; Cisneros 83' | Stadium: Gazi-Stadion auf der Waldau; Attendance: 800; Referee: Sandro Scharer |

==== Under-18 ====
===== Copa Chivas =====
| January 30 | United States | 1–0 | (Mexico) Monarcas Morelia | Guadalajara, Mexico |
| 13:00 ET | Pineda 8', (yellow card) 8'; Saucedo (yellow card) 65'; Williamson (yellow card) 71' | Report | Callente (yellow card) 65'; Avalos (yellow card) 73' | Stadium: Chivas Verde Valle; Attendance: 100; Referee: Abraham de Jesus Quirante Contreras |

| January 31 | United States | 0–1 | (Brazil) Cruzeiro | Guadalajara, Mexico |
| 10:00 ET | Pineda (yellow card) 53' | Report | Victor (yellow card) 24', (goal) 57' | Stadium: Chivas Verde Valle; Attendance: 70; Referee: Juan Jose Gutierrez Leon |

| February 2 | United States | 1–1 | (Mexico) Tijuana | Guadalajara, Mexico |
| 10:00 ET | Burns (yellow card) 46'; Williamson 62' | Report | Mathews 10'; Guerrero (yellow card) 67' | Stadium: Chivas Verde Valle; Attendance: 100; Referee: Sergio Omar Ruvallaba Amezrua |

| February 3 | United States | 0–1 | (Chile) Universidad Católica | Guadalajara, Mexico |
| 10:00 ET | Saucedo (yellow card) 25'; Boakye (yellow card) 28'; Elney (yellow card) 44'; Jones (red card) 70+4' | Report | Medel 25' | Stadium: Chivas Verde Valle; Attendance: 70; Referee: Alejandro Agustin Martinez Macias |

===== Friendlies =====
| February 5 | United States | 5–1 | (Japan) Urawa Red Diamonds | Guadalajara, Mexico |
| 17:00 ET | Mansaray 14'; Mason 42'; Williamson 49'; Lennon 59'; Elney 77' | Report | Watanabe 74' | Stadium: San Rafael; Attendance: 30 |

| April 25 | United States | 6–0 | (Bosnia and Herzegovina) Široki Brijeg | Medjugorje, Bosnia and Herzegovina |
| | | Report |

| April 28 | Bosnia and Herzegovina | 3–1 | United States | Medjugorje, Bosnia and Herzegovina |
| 16:00 | Akale 22' | Report | Modić 27'; Gojak 57'; Memija 63' | Stadium: Sport Centar Circle International; Attendance: 0 Referee: Goran Paradzik |

| April 30 | Bosnia and Herzegovina | 0–1 | United States | Medjugorje, Bosnia and Herzegovina |
| 16:00 | | Report | Akale 45' | Stadium: Stadion Bare |

==== Under-17 ====
===== CONCACAF U-17 Championship =====
| February 27 Group stage | United States | 5–0 | Cuba | San Pedro Sula, Honduras |
| 17:00 (UTC−6) | Arellano 5'; Gallardo 40', 65', 88'; Zendejas 43' | Report | | Stadium: Estadio Francisco Morazán; Attendance: 720; Referee: Mathieu Boudeau (Canada) |

| March 2 Group stage | Trinidad and Tobago | 0–2 | United States | San Pedro Sula, Honduras |
| 17:00 (UTC−6) | | Report | Gallardo 31'; Wright 71' | Stadium: Estadio Francisco Morazán; Attendance: 1,650; Referee: Adrian Skeete (Barbados) |

| March 5 Group stage | Guatemala | 1–4 | United States | San Pedro Sula, Honduras |
| 17:00 (UTC−6) | Soto 65' | Report | Perez 10', 19', 45' (pen.); Da Silva 48' | Stadium: Estadio Francisco Morazán; Attendance: 865; Referee: Ricardo Montero (Costa Rica) |

| March 8 Group stage | United States | 2–2 | Honduras | San Pedro Sula, Honduras |
| 19:30 (UTC−6) | de la Torre 23'; Perez 32' | Report | Matamoros 16'; Sánchez 88' | Stadium: Estadio Francisco Morazán; Attendance: 13,511; Referee: César Arturo Ramos (Mexico) |

| March 11 Group stage | United States | 0–1 | Jamaica | San Pedro Sula, Honduras |
| 17:00 (UTC−6) | | Report | Nelson 57' (pen.) | Stadium: Estadio Francisco Morazán; Attendance: 1,288; Referee: Ricardo Montero (Costa Rica) |

| March 15 Playoff stage | United States | 0–0 (5−4 p) | Jamaica | San Pedro Sula, Honduras |
| 17:00 (UTC−6) | | Report | | Stadium: Estadio Olímpico Metropolitano; Referee: Óscar Moncada (Honduras) |
| | Penalties |
| | Pulisic (penalty missed); Gallardo (penalty scored); Barbir (penalty scored); Zendejas (penalty scored); Nelson (penalty scored); Velela (penalty scored) | | (penalty scored) Nelson; (penalty missed) Hinds; (penalty scored) Hammond; (penalty scored) Senior; (penalty scored) Talbott; (penalty missed) Marshall |

===== FIFA U-17 World Cup =====
| October 17 Group stage | Nigeria | 2–0 | United States | Santiago, Chile |
| 16:00 ET | Agor 50'; Osimhen 61' | Report | | Stadium: Estadio Nacional Julio Martínez Prádanos; Attendance: 20,637; Referee: Deniz Aytekin (Germany) |

| October 20 Group stage | United States | 2–2 | Croatia | Viña del Mar, Chile |
| 16:00 ET | Pulisic 20'; Vazquez 40' | Report | Majić 65'; Ivanušec 75' | Stadium: Estadio Sausalito; Attendance: 21,893; Referee: Enrique Cáceres (Paraguay) |

| October 23 Group stage | United States | 1–4 | Chile | Viña del Mar, Chile |
| 19:00 ET | Vazquez 10' | Report | Allende 20'; Mazuela 52'; Jara 86'; Moya 90+3' | Stadium: Estadio Sausalito; Attendance: 19,321; Referee: Matej Jug (Slovenia) |

==== Under-15 ====
===== Torneo delle Nazioni =====
| April 25 Group stage | United States | 4–1 | Costa Rica | Gradisca d'Isonzo, Italy |
| 12:30 EST UTC−05:00 | Carleton 10' de Rosario 17', 23'; Carleton 28' | Report | Valverde 2' | Stadium: Gradisca d'Isonzo Field; Attendance: 100; Referee: Bubek Alen |

| April 26 Group stage | United States | 6–2 | Croatia | Gradisca d'Isonzo, Italy |
| 12:30 EST UTC−05:00 | Akinola 31', 42', 45', 60'; Carleton 63', 65' | Report | Pretovic 34'; Franjic 57' | Stadium: Gradisca d'Isonzo Field; Attendance: 65; Referee: Dzvzdanovic Jasmin |

| April 27 Group stage | Slovenia | 3–2 | United States | Gradisca d'Isonzo, Italy |
| 12:30 EST UTC−05:00 | Carleton 11', 23'; Weah 36' | Report | Meister 63', 76' | Stadium: Gradisca d'Isonzo Field; Attendance: 100; Referee: Bubek Alen |

| April 29 Semifinals | United States | 0–0 (a.e.t.) (5–4 p) | Italy | Gradisca d'Isonzo, Italy |
| 11:30 EST UTC−05:00 | Acosta (yellow card) 26' | Report | Zakaria (red card) 56'; Gomes (yellow card) 73'; Simone (yellow card) 84' | Stadium: Gradisca d'Isonzo Field; Attendance: 450; Referee: Ret Lorenzo |
| | Penalties |
| | Carleton (penalty scored); Acosta (penalty scored); Villegas (penalty scored); Goslin (penalty missed); Durkin (penalty scored); Weah (penalty scored) | | (penalty scored) Flavio; (penalty scored) Davide; (penalty scored) Andrea; (penalty scored) Ludovico; (penalty missed) Moise; (penalty missed) Lorenzo |

| May 1 Final | United States | 3–2 | Austria | Gradisca d'Isonzo, Italy |
| 10:30 EST UTC−05:00 | Carleton 11', 23'; Weah 36' | Report | Meister 63', 76' | Stadium: Gradisca d'Isonzo Field; Attendance: 500; Referee: Chiffi Daniece |

===== Friendlies =====
| June 8 | Uruguay | 1–0 | United States | Buenos Aires, Argentina |
| 15:30 EST UTC−05:00 | Viera 41' | Report | | Stadium: Racing Club Youth Facility |

| June 10 | Argentina | 2–1 | United States | Buenos Aires, Argentina |
| 15:30 EST UTC−05:00 | Colidio 52', 80+1' | Report | Licor 45' | Stadium: Predio de Ezeiza |

| June 12 | Paraguay | 3–1 | United States | Buenos Aires, Argentina |
| 15:30 EST UTC−05:00 | Sanchez 34'; Rolon 37'; Fernandez 72' | Report | dos Santos (yellow card) 46'; Acosta 69' | Stadium: Argentinos Juniors Training Facility |

=== Women ===
==== Senior ====
| Wins | Losses | Draws |
|---|---|---|
| 20 | 2 | 4 |

===== Friendlies =====
| February 8 | France | 2–0 | United States | Lorient, France |
| 12:00 EST | Le Sommer 50'; Houara 51' | Report | Heath (yellow card) 26' | Stadium: Stade du Moustoir; Attendance: 15,663; Referee: Pernilla Larsson (Sweden) |

| February 13 | England | 0–1 | United States | Milton Keynes, England |
| 15:00 EST | | Report | Morgan 25' | Stadium: Stadium mk Attendance: 14,369; Referee: Sandra Bastos (Portugal) |

| April 4 | United States | 4–0 | New Zealand | St. Louis, United States |
| 14:30 CDT | Klingenberg 14'; Chalupny 76'; Johnston 78'; Brian 81' | Report | | Stadium: Busch Stadium; Attendance: 35,817; Referee: Carol Anne Chenard (Canada) |

| May 10 | United States | 3–0 | Republic of Ireland | San Jose, United States |
| 11:30 PDT | Wambach 42', 45'; Johnston 54' | Report | | Stadium: Avaya Stadium; Attendance: 18,000; Referee: Ekaterina Koroleva (United States) |

| May 17 | United States | 5–1 | Mexico | Carson, United States |
| 18:30 PDT | Leroux 28', 61'; Chalupny 46'; Wambach 58' (pen.), 72' | Report | Calderon 39' | Stadium: StubHub Center; Attendance: 27,000; Referee: Marianela Araya Cruz (Costa Rica) |

| May 30 | United States | 0–0 | South Korea | Harrison, United States |
| 16:30 EDT | Lloyd (yellow card) 56' | Report | | Stadium: Red Bull Arena; Attendance: 26,467; Referee: Mirian Leon (El Salvador) |

| August 16 | United States | 8–0 | Costa Rica | Pittsburgh, United States |
| 13:30 EDT | O'Reilly 4', 59'; Press 29', 45', 68'; Johnston 36'; Klingenberg 56'; Engen 63' | Report | | Stadium: Heinz Field; Attendance: 44,028; Referee: Ekaterina Koroleva (United States) |

| August 19 | United States | 7–2 | Costa Rica | Chattanooga, United States |
| 18:30 EDT | Lloyd 7', 20'; O'Reilly 13', 23'; Wambach 18'; Alvarado 31' (o.g.); Morgan 81' | Report | Granados 41'; Villalobos 69' | Stadium: Finley Stadium; Attendance: 20,535; Referee: Margaret Domka (United States) |

| September 17 | United States | 5–0 | Haiti | Detroit, United States |
| 19:00 EDT | Lloyd 6', 37' (pen.), 69'; Press 33'; Dunn 90+3' | Report | | Stadium: Ford Field; Attendance: 34,538; Referee: Ekaterina Koroleva (United States) |

| September 20 | United States | 8–0 | Haiti | Birmingham, United States |
| 13:30 CDT | Johnston 1'; Lloyd 16' (pen.), 22', 39'; Dunn 17'; Rodriguez 51'; Morgan 85'; O'Reilly 89' | Report | | Stadium: Legion Field; Attendance: 35,753; Referee: Margaret Domka (United States) |

| October 21 | United States | 1–1 | Brazil | Seattle, United States |
| 19:00 PDT | Lloyd 85' | Report | Monica 3'; Rafaelle (yellow card) 65' | Stadium: CenturyLink Field; Attendance: 23,603; Referee: Ekaterina Koroleva (United States) |

| October 25 | United States | 3–1 | Brazil | Orlando, United States |
| 14:30 ET | Morgan 9'; Dunn (yellow card) 14'; Dunn 45+2'; Horan (yellow card) 66'; McCaffrey 90+3' | Report | Cristiane (yellow card) 37'; Cristiane 45+1' | Stadium: Citrus Bowl; Attendance: 32,869; Referee: Margaret Domka (United States) |

| December 10 | United States | 6–0 | Trinidad and Tobago | San Antonio, United States |
| 20:00 CT | Lloyd 22' (pen.); Morgan 52'; Press 61', 75', 84'; Horan 90+2' | Report | | Stadium: Alamodome; Attendance: 10,690; Referee: Lucila Venegas (Mexico) |

| December 13 | United States | 2–0 | China | Glendale, United States |
| 16:30 PT | Dunn 39'; Press 81' | Report | | Stadium: University of Phoenix Stadium; Attendance: 19,066; Referee: Cardella Samuels (Jamaica) |

| December 16 | United States | 0–1 | China | New Orleans, United States |
| 19:00 CT | | Report | Wang 59' | Stadium: Mercedes-Benz Superdome; Attendance: 32,950; Referee: Michelle Pye (Canada) |

===== Algarve Cup =====
| March 4 Group stage | Norway | 1–2 | United States | Vila Real de Santo António, Portugal |
| 14:00 ET | Hegerberg 43'; Ronnin (yellow card) 62' | Report | Lloyd 55', 62' (pen.) | Stadium: Estádio Municipal; Attendance: 500; Referee: Esther Staubil (Switzerland) |

| March 6 Group stage | United States | 3–0 | Switzerland | Vila Real de Santo António, Portugal |
| 12:00 ET | Morgan 54'; Lloyd (yellow card) 67'; Rodriguez 72'; Wambach 81' | Report | Wälti (yellow card) 70' | Stadium: Estádio Municipal; Attendance: 500; Referee: Cristina Dorcioman (Romania) |

| March 9 Group stage | United States | 0–0 | Iceland | Lagos, Portugal |
| 13:30 ET | Morgan (yellow card) 53' | Report | Magnúsdóttir (yellow card) 14'; Gunnarsdóttir (yellow card) 72'; Viðarsdóttir (yellow card) 89' | Stadium: Estádio Municipal; Attendance: 500; Referee: Abirami Naidu (Singapore) |

| March 11 Final | France | 0–2 | United States | Faro / Loulé, Portugal |
| 12:00 ET | | Report | Johnston 7'; Brian (yellow card) 33'; Press 41' | Stadium: Estádio Algarve; Attendance: 1,500; Referee: Cristina Dorcioman (Romania) |

===== FIFA Women's World Cup =====
| June 8 Group stage | United States | 3–1 | Australia | Winnipeg, Canada |
| 18:30 UTC−5 | Rapinoe 12', 78'; Press 61' | Report | De Vanna 27' | Stadium: Winnipeg Stadium; Attendance: 31,148; Referee: Claudia Umpierrez (Uruguay) |

| June 12 Group stage | United States | 0–0 | Sweden | Winnipeg, Canada |
| 19:00 UTC−5 | | Report | | Stadium: Winnipeg Stadium; Attendance: 32,716; Referee: Sachiko Yamagishi (Japan) |

| June 16 Group stage | Nigeria | 0–1 | United States | Vancouver, Canada |
| 17:00 UTC−7 | | Report | Wambach 45' | Stadium: BC Place; Attendance: 52,193; Referee: Kateryna Monzul (Ukraine) |

| June 22 Round of 16 | United States | 2–0 | Colombia | Edmonton, Canada |
| 18:00 UTC−6 | Morgan 53'; Lloyd 66' (pen.) | Report | | Stadium: Commonwealth Stadium; Attendance: 19,412; Referee: Stéphanie Frappart (France) |

| June 26 Quarter-final | China | 0–1 | United States | Ottawa, Canada |
| 19:30 UTC−4 | | Report | Lloyd 51' | Stadium: Lansdowne Stadium; Attendance: 24,141; Referee: Carina Vitulano (Italy) |

| June 30 Semi-final | United States | 2–0 | Germany | Montreal, Canada |
| 19:00 UTC−4 | Lloyd 69' (pen.); O'Hara 84' | Report | | Stadium: Olympic Stadium; Attendance: 51,176; Referee: Teodora Albon (Romania) |

| July 5 Final | United States | 5–2 | Japan | Vancouver, Canada |
| 16:00 UTC−7 | Lloyd 3', 5', 16'; Holiday 14'; Heath 54' | Report | Ōgimi 27'; Johnston 52' (o.g.) | Stadium: BC Place; Attendance: 53,341; Referee: Kateryna Monzul (Ukraine) |

==== Under-23 ====
===== La Manga Tournament =====
| February 26 | United States | 1–0 | Japan | La Manga, Spain |
| 12:00 PT | Williams 54' | Report | | Stadium: La Manga Stadium; Referee: J. Lavrenovaite |

| February 28 | United States | 2–0 | Norway | La Manga, Spain |
| 9:00 ET | Groom 42'; Colaprico 70' | Report | | Stadium: La Manga Stadium; Referee: J. Lavrenovaite |

| March 2 | United States | 2–1 | England | La Manga, Spain |
| 9:00 ET | Killion 33' (pen.); Williams 51' | Report | Williams 81' | Stadium: La Manga Stadium; Referee: C. Eide |

===== Four Nations Tournament =====
| May 27 | United States | 2–1 | Sweden | Fredrikstad, Norway |
| | Mills 5'; Roccaro 29' | Report | Landström 53' | Stadium: Fredrikstad Stadion; Attendance: 0 Referee: Cathrine Eide (Norway) |

| May 29 | Norway | 2–2 | United States | Sarpsborg, Norway |
| | Hegerberg 11' (pen.); Hansen 78' | Report | Ubogagu 51', 75' | Stadium: Sarpsborg Stadion; Attendance: 0 Referee: Fatemeh Zangeneh (Norway) |

| May 31 | United States | 2–1 | England | Fredrikstad, Norway |
| | Lavelle 7'; Smith 73' | Report | Sigsworth 60' | Stadium: Fredrikstad Stadion; Attendance: 0 Referee: Emilie Rodahl Dokseth (Norway) |

== American club leagues ==
=== Major League Soccer ===
==== Conference tables ====
Eastern Conference

| Pos | Team | Pld | W | L | T | GF | GA | GD | Pts | Qualification |
|---|---|---|---|---|---|---|---|---|---|---|
| 1 | New York Red Bulls | 34 | 18 | 10 | 6 | 62 | 43 | +19 | 60 | Qualification for the conference semifinals |
| 2 | Columbus Crew SC | 34 | 15 | 11 | 8 | 58 | 53 | +5 | 53 | Qualification for the conference semifinals |
| 3 | Montreal Impact | 34 | 15 | 13 | 6 | 48 | 44 | +4 | 51 | Qualification for the knockout round |
| 4 | D.C. United | 34 | 15 | 13 | 6 | 43 | 45 | −2 | 51 | Qualification for the knockout round |
| 5 | New England Revolution | 34 | 14 | 12 | 8 | 48 | 47 | +1 | 50 | Qualification for the knockout round |
| 6 | Toronto FC | 34 | 15 | 15 | 4 | 58 | 58 | 0 | 49 | Qualification for the knockout round |
| 7 | Orlando City SC | 34 | 12 | 14 | 8 | 46 | 56 | −10 | 44 | |
| 8 | New York City FC | 34 | 10 | 17 | 7 | 49 | 58 | −9 | 37 | |
| 9 | Philadelphia Union | 34 | 10 | 17 | 7 | 42 | 55 | −13 | 37 | |
| 10 | Chicago Fire | 34 | 8 | 20 | 6 | 43 | 58 | −15 | 30 | |

Source: MLS

Western Conference

| Pos | Team | Pld | W | L | T | GF | GA | GD | Pts | Qualification |
|---|---|---|---|---|---|---|---|---|---|---|
| 1 | FC Dallas | 34 | 18 | 10 | 6 | 52 | 39 | +13 | 60 | Qualification for the conference semifinals |
| 2 | Vancouver Whitecaps FC | 34 | 16 | 13 | 5 | 45 | 36 | +9 | 53 | Qualification for the conference semifinals |
| 3 | Portland Timbers | 34 | 15 | 11 | 8 | 41 | 39 | +2 | 53 | Qualification for the knockout round |
| 4 | Seattle Sounders FC | 34 | 15 | 13 | 6 | 44 | 36 | +8 | 51 | Qualification for the knockout round |
| 5 | LA Galaxy | 34 | 14 | 11 | 9 | 56 | 46 | +10 | 51 | Qualification for the knockout round |
| 6 | Sporting Kansas City | 34 | 14 | 11 | 9 | 48 | 45 | +3 | 51 | Qualification for the knockout round |
| 7 | San Jose Earthquakes | 34 | 13 | 13 | 8 | 41 | 39 | +2 | 47 | |
| 8 | Houston Dynamo | 34 | 11 | 14 | 9 | 42 | 49 | −7 | 42 | |
| 9 | Real Salt Lake | 34 | 11 | 15 | 8 | 38 | 48 | −10 | 41 | |
| 10 | Colorado Rapids | 34 | 9 | 15 | 10 | 33 | 43 | −10 | 37 | |

Source: MLS

==== Overall table ====
Note: the table below has no impact on playoff qualification and is used solely for determining host of the MLS Cup, certain CCL spots, the Supporters' Shield trophy, seeding in the 2016 Canadian Championship, and 2016 MLS draft. The conference tables are the sole determinant for teams qualifying for the playoffs.

| Pos | Team | Pld | W | L | T | GF | GA | GD | Pts | |
|---|---|---|---|---|---|---|---|---|---|---|
| 1 | New York Red Bulls (S) | 34 | 18 | 10 | 6 | 62 | 43 | +19 | 60 | Qualification for the CONCACAF Champions League |
| 2 | FC Dallas | 34 | 18 | 10 | 6 | 52 | 39 | +13 | 60 | Qualification for the CONCACAF Champions League |
| 3 | Vancouver Whitecaps FC (V) | 34 | 16 | 13 | 5 | 45 | 36 | +9 | 53 | Qualification for the CONCACAF Champions League |
| 4 | Columbus Crew SC | 34 | 15 | 11 | 8 | 58 | 53 | +5 | 53 | |
| 5 | Portland Timbers (C) | 34 | 15 | 11 | 8 | 41 | 39 | +2 | 53 | Qualification for the CONCACAF Champions League |
| 6 | Seattle Sounders FC | 34 | 15 | 13 | 6 | 44 | 36 | +8 | 51 | |
| 7 | Montreal Impact | 34 | 15 | 13 | 6 | 48 | 44 | +4 | 51 | |
| 8 | D.C. United | 34 | 15 | 13 | 6 | 43 | 45 | −2 | 51 | |
| 9 | LA Galaxy | 34 | 14 | 11 | 9 | 56 | 46 | +10 | 51 | |
| 10 | Sporting Kansas City (U) | 34 | 14 | 11 | 9 | 48 | 45 | +3 | 51 | Qualification for the CONCACAF Champions League |
| 11 | New England Revolution | 34 | 14 | 12 | 8 | 48 | 47 | +1 | 50 | |
| 12 | Toronto FC | 34 | 15 | 15 | 4 | 58 | 58 | 0 | 49 | |
| 13 | San Jose Earthquakes | 34 | 13 | 13 | 8 | 41 | 39 | +2 | 47 | |
| 14 | Orlando City SC | 34 | 12 | 14 | 8 | 46 | 56 | −10 | 44 | |
| 15 | Houston Dynamo | 34 | 11 | 14 | 9 | 42 | 49 | −7 | 42 | |
| 16 | Real Salt Lake | 34 | 11 | 15 | 8 | 38 | 48 | −10 | 41 | |
| 17 | New York City FC | 34 | 10 | 17 | 7 | 49 | 58 | −9 | 37 | |
| 18 | Philadelphia Union | 34 | 10 | 17 | 7 | 42 | 55 | −13 | 37 | |
| 19 | Colorado Rapids | 34 | 9 | 15 | 10 | 33 | 43 | −10 | 37 | |
| 20 | Chicago Fire | 34 | 8 | 20 | 6 | 43 | 58 | −15 | 30 | |

Source: MLS
Rules for classification: 1) points; 2) total wins; 3) total goal differential; 4) total goals scored
(C) MLS Cup champions; (S) Supporters' Shield winners; (U) U.S. Open Cup winners; (V) Canadian Championship winners

=== North American Soccer League ===
==== Spring Season ====
| Pos | Team | Pld | W | D | L | GF | GA | GD | Pts | Qualification |
|---|---|---|---|---|---|---|---|---|---|---|
| 1 | New York Cosmos (S) | 10 | 5 | 5 | 0 | 18 | 9 | +9 | 20 | Playoffs |
| 2 | Tampa Bay Rowdies | 10 | 5 | 4 | 1 | 15 | 9 | +6 | 19 | |
| 3 | Carolina RailHawks | 10 | 3 | 5 | 2 | 15 | 10 | +5 | 14 | |
| 4 | Minnesota United | 10 | 3 | 5 | 2 | 15 | 13 | +2 | 14 | |
| 5 | Indy Eleven | 10 | 3 | 4 | 3 | 13 | 12 | +1 | 13 | |
| 6 | Jacksonville Armada | 10 | 3 | 3 | 4 | 15 | 18 | −3 | 12 | |
| 7 | San Antonio Scorpions | 10 | 3 | 3 | 4 | 11 | 15 | −4 | 12 | |
| 8 | Fort Lauderdale Strikers | 10 | 3 | 2 | 5 | 12 | 13 | −1 | 11 | |
| 9 | Ottawa Fury | 10 | 2 | 5 | 3 | 5 | 8 | −3 | 11 | |
| 10 | FC Edmonton | 10 | 2 | 3 | 5 | 16 | 22 | −6 | 9 | |
| 11 | Atlanta Silverbacks | 10 | 1 | 5 | 4 | 7 | 13 | −6 | 8 | |

Source: NASL
Rules for classification: 1) points; 2) total goal differential; 3) total goals scored; 4) head-to-head record; 5) away goal differential; 6) away goals scored
(S) Spring season champion

==== Fall Season ====
| Pos | Team | Pld | W | D | L | GF | GA | GD | Pts | Qualification |
|---|---|---|---|---|---|---|---|---|---|---|
| 1 | Ottawa Fury (F) | 20 | 13 | 6 | 1 | 37 | 15 | +22 | 45 | Playoffs |
| 2 | Minnesota United | 20 | 11 | 6 | 3 | 39 | 26 | +13 | 39 | |
| 3 | New York Cosmos | 20 | 10 | 6 | 4 | 31 | 21 | +10 | 36 | |
| 4 | Fort Lauderdale Strikers | 20 | 8 | 6 | 6 | 37 | 27 | +10 | 30 | |
| 5 | FC Edmonton | 20 | 7 | 5 | 8 | 25 | 24 | +1 | 26 | |
| 6 | Atlanta Silverbacks | 20 | 6 | 7 | 7 | 24 | 27 | −3 | 25 | |
| 7 | Carolina RailHawks | 20 | 6 | 3 | 11 | 29 | 39 | −10 | 21 | |
| 8 | Tampa Bay Rowdies | 20 | 5 | 5 | 10 | 18 | 28 | −10 | 20 | |
| 9 | Indy Eleven | 20 | 5 | 5 | 10 | 23 | 36 | −13 | 20 | |
| 10 | San Antonio Scorpions | 20 | 4 | 7 | 9 | 30 | 37 | −7 | 19 | |
| 11 | Jacksonville Armada | 20 | 5 | 4 | 11 | 18 | 31 | −13 | 19 | |

Source: NASL
Rules for classification: 1) points; 2) total goal differential; 3) total goals scored; 4) head-to-head record; 5) away goal differential; 6) away goals scored
(F) Fall season champion

=== USL ===
Eastern Conference

| Pos | Team | Pld | W | D | L | GF | GA | GD | Pts | Qualification |
|---|---|---|---|---|---|---|---|---|---|---|
| 1 | Rochester Rhinos (C, X) | 28 | 17 | 10 | 1 | 40 | 15 | +25 | 61 | Conference semi-finals |
| 2 | Louisville City FC | 28 | 14 | 6 | 8 | 55 | 34 | +21 | 48 | Conference semi-finals |
| 3 | Charleston Battery | 28 | 12 | 10 | 6 | 43 | 28 | +15 | 46 | First round |
| 4 | New York Red Bulls II | 28 | 12 | 6 | 10 | 46 | 45 | +1 | 42 | First round |
| 5 | Pittsburgh Riverhounds | 28 | 11 | 8 | 9 | 53 | 42 | +11 | 41 | First round |
| 6 | Richmond Kickers | 28 | 10 | 11 | 7 | 41 | 35 | +6 | 41 | First round |
| 7 | Charlotte Independence | 28 | 10 | 10 | 8 | 38 | 35 | +3 | 40 | |
| 8 | Harrisburg City Islanders | 28 | 11 | 6 | 11 | 49 | 53 | −4 | 39 | |
| 9 | Saint Louis FC | 28 | 8 | 9 | 11 | 30 | 40 | −10 | 33 | |
| 10 | FC Montreal | 28 | 8 | 4 | 16 | 32 | 46 | −14 | 28 | |
| 11 | Toronto FC II | 28 | 6 | 5 | 17 | 26 | 52 | −26 | 23 | |
| 12 | Wilmington Hammerheads | 28 | 3 | 10 | 15 | 22 | 42 | −20 | 19 | |

Source: 2015 USL schedule
Rules for classification: 1) head-to-head; 2) total wins; 3) total goal differential; 4) total goals scored; 5) disciplinary points; 6) away goals scored; 7) away goal differential; 8) home goals scored; 9) home goal differential; 10) coin toss or drawing of lots
(C) Champions; (X) Regular Season League Champion

Western Conference

| Pos | Team | Pld | W | D | L | GF | GA | GD | Pts | Qualification |
|---|---|---|---|---|---|---|---|---|---|---|
| 1 | Orange County Blues | 28 | 14 | 5 | 9 | 38 | 34 | +4 | 47 | Conference semi-finals |
| 2 | Oklahoma City Energy | 28 | 13 | 8 | 7 | 44 | 36 | +8 | 47 | Conference semi-finals |
| 3 | Colorado Springs Switchbacks | 28 | 14 | 4 | 10 | 53 | 35 | +18 | 46 | First round |
| 4 | Sacramento Republic | 28 | 13 | 7 | 8 | 43 | 31 | +12 | 46 | First round |
| 5 | LA Galaxy II | 28 | 14 | 3 | 11 | 39 | 31 | +8 | 45 | First round |
| 6 | Seattle Sounders 2 | 28 | 13 | 3 | 12 | 45 | 42 | +3 | 42 | First round |
| 7 | Tulsa Roughnecks | 28 | 11 | 6 | 11 | 49 | 46 | +3 | 39 | |
| 8 | Portland Timbers 2 | 28 | 11 | 2 | 15 | 38 | 45 | −7 | 35 | |
| 9 | Austin Aztex | 28 | 10 | 3 | 15 | 32 | 41 | −9 | 33 | |
| 10 | Arizona United | 28 | 10 | 2 | 16 | 31 | 55 | −24 | 32 | |
| 11 | Vancouver Whitecaps 2 | 28 | 8 | 6 | 14 | 39 | 53 | −14 | 30 | |
| 12 | Real Monarchs | 28 | 7 | 8 | 13 | 32 | 42 | −10 | 29 | |

Source: 2015 USL schedule
Rules for classification: 1) head-to-head; 2) total wins; 3) total goal differential; 4) total goals scored; 5) disciplinary points; 6) away goals scored; 7) away goal differential; 8) home goals scored; 9) home goal differential; 10) coin toss or drawing of lots

=== National Women's Soccer League ===
==== Overall table ====
| Pos | Team | Pld | W | D | L | GF | GA | GD | Pts | Qualification |
|---|---|---|---|---|---|---|---|---|---|---|
| 1 | Seattle Reign FC | 20 | 13 | 4 | 3 | 41 | 21 | +20 | 43 | NWSL Shield |
| 2 | Chicago Red Stars | 20 | 8 | 9 | 3 | 31 | 22 | +9 | 33 | NWSL Playoffs |
| 3 | FC Kansas City (C) | 20 | 9 | 5 | 6 | 32 | 20 | +12 | 32 | NWSL Playoffs |
| 4 | Washington Spirit | 20 | 8 | 6 | 6 | 31 | 28 | +3 | 30 | NWSL Playoffs |
| 5 | Houston Dash | 20 | 6 | 6 | 8 | 21 | 26 | −5 | 24 | |
| 6 | Portland Thorns FC | 20 | 6 | 5 | 9 | 27 | 29 | −2 | 23 | |
| 7 | Western New York Flash | 20 | 6 | 5 | 9 | 24 | 34 | −10 | 23 | |
| 8 | Sky Blue FC | 20 | 5 | 7 | 8 | 22 | 28 | −6 | 22 | |
| 9 | Boston Breakers | 20 | 4 | 3 | 13 | 22 | 43 | −21 | 15 | |

Source: NWSL
Rules for classification: Tiebreakers
(C) Champions

=== US Open Cup ===
==== Final ====
| September 30 | Philadelphia Union (Pennsylvania) | 1–1 (a.e.t.) (6–7 p) | Sporting Kansas City | Chester, Pennsylvania |
| 19:00 EDT | Le Toux 23' | Report | Németh 65' | Stadium: PPL Park; Attendance: 14,463; Referee: Ted Unkel |
| | Penalties |
| | Le Toux (penalty scored); Nogueira (penalty scored); Edu (penalty missed); Barnetta (penalty scored); Casey (penalty scored); Lahoud (penalty scored); Gaddis (penalty scored); Wenger (penalty missed) | | (penalty scored) Feilhaber; (penalty scored) Dwyer; (penalty missed) Németh; (penalty scored) Besler; (penalty scored) Nagamura; (penalty scored) Zusi; (penalty scored) Ellis; (penalty scored) Quintillà |

== American clubs in international competition ==
| Club | Competition | Final round |
|---|---|---|
| D.C. United | 2014–15 CONCACAF Champions League | Quarterfinals |
| New York Red Bulls | 2014–15 CONCACAF Champions League | Group stage |
| Sporting Kansas City | 2014–15 CONCACAF Champions League | Group stage |
| Portland Timbers | 2014–15 CONCACAF Champions League | Group stage |
| D.C. United | 2015–16 CONCACAF Champions League | Quarterfinals |
| LA Galaxy | 2015–16 CONCACAF Champions League | Quarterfinals |
| Real Salt Lake | 2015–16 CONCACAF Champions League | Quarterfinals |
| Seattle Sounders FC | 2015–16 CONCACAF Champions League | Quarterfinals |

teams in bold are still active in the competition

=== 2014–15 CONCACAF Champions League ===
==== Knock-Out stage ====
===== D.C. United =====
| February 24 Quarterfinals | **Alajuelense (Costa Rica)** | **5–2** | **(United States) D.C. United** | Alajuela, Costa Rica |
| 22:00 EDT | Rodríguez 15' (pen.); Ortiz 22', 54'; Venegas 27'; McDonald 90' | Report | Dykstra (yellow card) 14'; Espindola 24'; Arrieta (yellow card) 67'; Birnbaum 88' | Stadium: Alejandro Soto Stadium; Referee: Roberto García (Mexico) |

| March 4 Quarterfinals | **D.C. United (United States)** | **2–1** (**4–6** agg.) | **(Costa Rica) Alajuelense** | Washington, United States |
| 20:00 EDT | Birnbaum (yellow card) 11'; Kitchen (yellow card) 27'; Arrieta 36' (yellow card) 37'; Korb (yellow card) 45+3'; Arnaud (yellow card) 63'; Espindola 88' (pen.) | Report | Venegas (yellow card) 11'; McDonald (yellow card) 45+3'; Korb 71' (o.g.); Alonso (yellow card) 81'; Acosta (yellow card) 88' | Stadium: RFK Stadium; Referee: Walter López (Guatemala) |

=== 2015–16 CONCACAF Champions League ===
==== Group stage ====
===== D.C. United =====
| August 19 Group stage | **Árabe Unido (Panama)** | **0–1** | **(United States) D.C. United** | Panama City, Panama |
| 20:00 | | Report | Aguilar 85' | Stadium: Estadio Maracaná; Referee: Karl Tyrell (Jamaica) |

| August 25 Group stage | **D.C. United (United States)** | **3–0** | **(Jamaica) Montego Bay United** | Washington, United States |
| 20:00 | Aguilar 37'; Opare 70'; Doyle 90+1' | Report | | Stadium: RFK Stadium; Referee: Henry Bejarano (Costa Rica) |

| September 15 Group stage | **D.C. United (United States)** | **2–0** | **(Panama) Árabe Unido** | Washington, United States |
| 20:00 | Doyle 1'; Jeffrey 22' | Report | | Stadium: RFK Stadium; Referee: Sherwin Moore (Guyana) |

| September 22 Group stage | **Montego Bay United (Jamaica)** | **3–3** | **(United States) D.C. United** | Montego Bay, Jamaica |
| 20:00 | Woozencroft 26'; Williams 29', 49' (pen.) | Report | Arrieta 59'; Opare 78'; Farfan 90+3' | Stadium: Montego Bay Sports Complex; Referee: Yadel Martínez (Cuba) |

D.C. advanced to the quarterfinals, played in 2016

===== LA Galaxy =====
| August 6 Group stage | **LA Galaxy (United States)** | **5–1** | **(Trinidad and Tobago) Central** | Carson, United States |
| 22:00 | Gordon 4'; Mendiola 32'; Zardes 55' (pen.) dos Santos 76'; Maganto 85' | Report | Guerra 6' (pen.) | Stadium: StubHub Center; Attendance: 13,625; Referee: Christopher Reid (Belize) |

| August 18 Group stage | **LA Galaxy (United States)** | **5–0** | **(Guatemala) Comunicaciones** | Carson, United States |
| 22:00 | Väyrynen 5'; Gordon 9', 54'; Keane 87', 89' | Report | | Stadium: StubHub Center; Referee: José Alfredo Peñaloza (Mexico) |

| September 23 Group stage | **Central (Trinidad and Tobago)** | **1–1** | **(United States) LA Galaxy** | Port of Spain, Trinidad and Tobago |
| 20:00 | Plaza 2' | Report | Gordon 82' | Stadium: Hasely Crawford Stadium; Referee: William Anderson (Puerto Rico) |

| October 21 Group stage | **Comunicaciones (Guatemala)** | **1–1** | **(United States) LA Galaxy** | Guatemala City, Guatemala |
| 22:00 | Blackburn 90+3' | Report | Gordon 84' | Stadium: Estadio Cementos Progreso; Referee: Fernando Guerrero (Mexico) |

LA advanced to the quarterfinals, played in 2016

===== Real Salt Lake =====
| August 4 Group stage | **Municipal (Guatemala)** | **0–1** | **(United States) Real Salt Lake** | Guatemala City, Guatemala |
| 22:00 | | Report | Plata 3' | Stadium: Estadio Mateo Flores; Referee: Raúl Castro (Honduras) |

| September 15 Group stage | **Santa Tecla (El Salvador)** | **0–0** | **(United States) Real Salt Lake** | Santa Tecla, El Salvador |
| 22:00 | | Report | | Stadium: Estadio Las Delicias; Referee: Leo Clarke (Saint Lucia) |

| September 24 Group stage | **Real Salt Lake (United States)** | **2–1** | **(El Salvador) Santa Tecla** | Sandy, United States |
| 22:00 | García 73'; Martínez 77' | Report | Herrera 61' | Stadium: Rio Tinto Stadium; Attendance: 18,182; Referee: Kevin Morrison (Jamaica) |

| October 20 Group stage | **Real Salt Lake (United States)** | **1–0** | **(Guatemala) Municipal** | Sandy, United States |
| 22:00 | Olave 43' | Report | | Stadium: Rio Tinto Stadium; Attendance: 18,132; Referee: Melvin Matamoros (Honduras) |

Real Salt Lake advanced to the quarterfinals, played in 2016

===== Seattle Sounders FC =====
| August 5 Group stage | **Vancouver Whitecaps FC (Canada)** | **1–1** | **(United States) Seattle Sounders FC** | Vancouver, Canada |
| 22:00 | Parker 61' | Report | Neagle 71' | Stadium: BC Place; Attendance: 19,683; Referee: Luis Enrique Santander (Mexico) |

| August 19 Group stage | **Seattle Sounders FC (United States)** | **2–1** | **(Honduras) Olimpia** | Seattle, United States |
| 22:00 | Friberg 90'; Evans 90+7' (pen.) | Report | Elis 5' | Stadium: CenturyLink Field; Attendance: 37,106; Referee: Kimbell Ward (Saint Kitts and Nevis) |

| August 26 Group stage | **Olimpia (Honduras)** | **1–0** | **(United States) Seattle Sounders FC** | Tegucigalpa, Honduras |
| 22:00 | Elis 60' | Report | | Stadium: Estadio Tiburcio Carías Andino; Referee: Sandy Vásquez (Dominican Republic) |

| September 23 Group stage | **Seattle Sounders FC (United States)** | **3–0** | **(Canada) Vancouver Whitecaps FC** | Seattle, United States |
| 22:00 | Neagle 32', 47'; Barrett 39' | Report | | Stadium: CenturyLink Field; Attendance: 37,624; Referee: Fernando Guerrero (Mexico) |

Seattle advanced to the quarterfinals, played in 2016

== Honors ==
=== Professional ===
Men
| Competition | | Winner |
|---|---|---|
| U.S. Open Cup | | Sporting Kansas City |
| MLS Supporters' Shield | | New York Red Bulls |
| MLS Cup | | Portland Timbers |
| NASL | Spring season | New York Cosmos |
| NASL | Fall season | Ottawa Fury FC |
| NASL | Regular season | New York Cosmos |
| NASL | Soccer Bowl | New York Cosmos |
| USL | Regular season | Rochester Rhinos |
| USL | Playoffs | Rochester Rhinos |

Women
| Competition | Winner |
|---|---|
| NWSL Championship | FC Kansas City |
| NWSL Shield | Seattle Reign FC |
| W-League | Washington Spirit Reserves |
| Women's Premier Soccer League | Chicago Red Stars Reserves |

=== Amateur ===
Men
| Competition | Team |
|---|---|
| Premier Development League | K-W United FC |
| National Premier Soccer League | New York Cosmos B |
| NCAA Division I Soccer Championship | Stanford |
| NCAA Division II Soccer Championship | Pfeiffer University |
| NCAA Division III Soccer Championship | Amherst College |
| NAIA Soccer Championship | Rio Grande (OH) |

Women
| Competition | Team |
|---|---|
| NCAA Division I Soccer Championship | Penn State |
| NCAA Division II Soccer Championship | Grand Valley State |
| NCAA Division III Soccer Championship | Williams College |
| NAIA Soccer Championship | Spring Arbor (MI) |
