= 2015 Toulon Tournament =

Tournament details
- Host country: France
- Dates: 27 May – 7 June
- Teams: 10 (from 5 confederations)
- Venues: 6 (in 5 host cities)

Final positions
- Champions: France
- Runners-up: Morocco
- Third place: United States
- Fourth place: England

Tournament statistics
- Matches played: 22
- Goals scored: 70 (3.18 per match)
- Top scorer(s): (Morocco) Achraf Bencharki (France) Enzo Crivelli (4 goals each)
- Best player: (Morocco) Walid El Karti

The 2015 Toulon Tournament was the 43rd edition of the Toulon Tournament. The competition began on 27 May and ended on 7 June 2015.

== Participants ==
AFC

- China
- Qatar

CAF

- Ivory Coast
- Morocco

CONCACAF

- Costa Rica
- Mexico
- United States

UEFA

- England
- France
- Netherlands

== Venues ==
Aubagne	Toulon	Saint-Raphaël
Stade de Lattre-de-Tassigny	Stade Léo Lagrange	Stade Louis Hon
43.293853°N 5.562354°E	43.127929°N 5.972961°E	43.429809°N 6.807242°E
Salon de Provence	Hyères	Toulon
Stade Marcel Roustan	Stade Perruc	Stade Mayol
43.635734°N 5.092868°E	43.120248°N 6.141868°E	43.119009°N 5.936523°E

== Group stage ==
=== Group A ===
Pos	Team	Pld	W	D	L	GF	GA	GD	Pts	Qualification
1	France (H)	4	4	0	0	11	2	+9	12	Advance to final
2	United States	4	2	0	2	6	6	0	6	Advance to third-place playoff
3	Netherlands	4	2	0	2	9	10	−1	6	
4	Costa Rica	4	1	1	2	6	7	−1	4	
5	Qatar	4	0	1	3	2	9	−7	1	

Source: festival-foot-espoirs.com
(H) Hosts
27 May 2015
17:00 CEST

Netherlands	3–2	Costa Rica
El Ghazi 3'; Vloet 6', 32'		Ramírez 39', 58'

Stade Léo Lagrange, Toulon
Referee: Abou Coulibaly (Ivory Coast)
27 May 2015
19:00 CEST

United States	1–3	France
Morris 65'		Bahlouli 10'; Crivelli 11'; Sparagna 21'

Stade Léo Lagrange, Toulon
Referee: Adil Zourak (Morocco)

29 May 2015
17:00 CEST

United States	3–1	Netherlands
Kiesewetter 19'; Hernández 24'; Packwood 43'		Darri 9'

Stade Perruc, Hyères
Referee: Abou Coulibaly (Ivory Coast)
29 May 2015
19:00 CEST

Qatar	0–2	France
		Hunou 11'; Kaabouni 65'

Stade Perruc, Hyères
Referee: Oscar Macias Romo (Mexico)

31 May 2015
17:00 CEST

Costa Rica	2–1	United States
Matarrita 24'; Ramírez 55'		Alashe 30'

Stade Louis Hon, Saint-Raphaël
Referee: Oscar Macias Romo (Mexico)
31 May 2015
19:00 CEST

Netherlands	5–1	Qatar
Hateboer 23' van Overeem 49'; Rayhi 50'; Janssen 52', 74'		Al-Yahri 78'

Stade Louis Hon, Saint-Raphaël
Referee: Adil Zourak (Morocco)

2 June 2015
17:00 CEST

Qatar	0–1	United States
		Green 8'

Stade de Lattre-de-Tassigny, Aubagne
Referee: Fabio Verissimo (Portugal)
2 June 2015
19:00 CEST

France	2–1	Costa Rica
Crivelli 40', 61'		Flores 66'

Stade de Lattre-de-Tassigny, Aubagne
Referee: Abou Coulibaly (Ivory Coast)

4 June 2015
17:00 CEST

Costa Rica	1–1	Qatar
Lassiter 67'		Al Salemi 45'

Stade Léo Lagrange, Toulon
Referee: Adil Zourak (Morocco)
4 June 2015
19:00 CEST

France	4–0	Netherlands
Habran 18'; Kaabouni 48' (pen.); N'Nomo 53'; Crivelli 73'

Stade Léo Lagrange, Toulon
Referee: Oscar Macias Romo (Mexico)

=== Group B ===
Pos	Team	Pld	W	D	L	GF	GA	GD	Pts	Qualification
1	Morocco	4	2	2	0	8	4	+4	8	Advance to final
2	England	4	2	1	1	9	7	+2	7	Advance to third-place playoff
3	Mexico	4	2	1	1	6	4	+2	7	
4	Ivory Coast	4	1	2	1	5	3	+2	5	
5	China	4	0	0	4	1	11	−10	0	

Source: festival-foot-espoirs.com
28 May 2015
17:00 CEST

Ivory Coast	1–1	Mexico
Bayo 65'		Guzmán 46'

Stade Léo Lagrange, Toulon
Referee: Denis Higler (Netherlands)
28 May 2015
19:00 CEST

England	3–3	Morocco
Gray 8'; Watmore 24'; Akpom 78'		Hajhouj 13'; Bencharki 14', 39'

Stade Léo Lagrange, Toulon
Referee: Fahad Al-Marri (Qatar)

30 May 2015
15:00 CEST

England	2–1	Ivory Coast
Akpom 10'; Robinson 43'		Koné 77'

Stade Léo Lagrange, Toulon
Referee: Robert Sibiga (United States)
30 May 2015
17:00 CEST

China	0–3	Morocco
		Bencharki 21'; Cao Haiqing 69' (o.g.); Bahja 80+1'

Stade Léo Lagrange, Toulon
Referee: Fabio Verissimo (Portugal)

1 June 2015
17:00 CEST

Morocco	0–0	Ivory Coast

Stade Marcel Roustan, Salon de Provence
Referee: Amaury Delerue (France)
1 June 2015
19:00 CEST

China	0–2	Mexico
		Cisneros 41', 59'

Stade Marcel Roustan, Salon de Provence
Referee: Fahad Al-Marri (Qatar)

3 June 2015
17:00 CEST

Ivory Coast	3–0	China
Bedia 6'; Zhang Xiaobin 28' (o.g.); Outtara 32'

Stade de Lattre-de-Tassigny, Aubagne
Referee: Robert Sibiga (United States)
3 June 2015
19:00 CEST

Mexico	2–1	England
Bueno 44'; Zuñiga 70'		Watmore 15'

Stade de Lattre-de-Tassigny, Aubagne
Referee: Denis Higler (Netherlands)

5 June 2015
17:00 CEST

Morocco	2–1	Mexico
El Karti 41'; Banoune (red card); Bencharki 61' (pen.)		Pérez 27'

Stade Léo Lagrange, Toulon
Referee: Denis Higler (Netherlands)
5 June 2015
19:00 CEST

China	1–3	England
Guo Yi 55'		Aarons 39'; Baker 52'; Zhang Xiaobin 59' (o.g.)

Stade Léo Lagrange, Toulon
Referee: Robert Sibiga (United States)

== Knockout stage ==
=== Third place playoff ===
7 June 2015
17:00 CEST

United States	2–1	England
Hernandez 7' (pen.); Joya 65' (pen.)		Hause 10'

Stade Mayol, Toulon
Referee: Fabio Verissimo (Portugal)

=== Final ===
7 June 2015
19:30 CEST

France	3–1	Morocco
Habran 56' (red card) 66'; Sparagna 64'; Diarra 80+1'		Ennafati 3'

Stade Mayol, Toulon
Referee: Fahad Al-Marri (Qatar)

== Goalscorers ==
4 goals

- (Morocco) Achraf Bencharki
- (France) Enzo Crivelli

3 goals

- (Costa Rica) David Ramírez

2 goals

- (England) Chuba Akpom
- (England) Duncan Watmore
- (France) Romain Habran
- (France) Younès Kaabouni
- (France) Stéphane Sparagna
- (Mexico) Carlos Cisneros
- (Netherlands) Rai Vloet
- (Netherlands) Vincent Janssen
- (United States) Alonso Hernández

1 goal

- (China) Guo Yi
- (Costa Rica) Dylan Flores
- (Costa Rica) Ariel Lassiter
- (Costa Rica) Rónald Matarrita
- (England) Rolando Aarons
- (England) Lewis Baker
- (England) Demarai Gray
- (England) Kortney Hause
- (England) Callum Robinson
- (France) Farès Bahlouli
- (France) Mamadou Diarra
- (France) Adrien Hunou
- (France) Ulrich N'Nomo
- (Ivory Coast) Vakoun Bayo
- (Ivory Coast) Abdul Manfouss Koné
- (Ivory Coast) Chris Bedia
- (Ivory Coast) Ousmane Ouattara
- (Mexico) Marco Bueno
- (Mexico) Carlos Guzmán
- (Mexico) Michael Pérez
- (Mexico) Martín Zúñiga
- (Morocco) Soufiane Bahja
- (Morocco) Adam Ennafati
- (Morocco) Hajhouj
- (Morocco) Walid El Karti
- (Netherlands) Brahim Darri
- (Netherlands) Anwar El Ghazi
- (Netherlands) Mohamed Rayhi
- (Netherlands) Clint Leemans
- (Netherlands) Joris van Overeem
- (Netherlands) Hans Hateboer
- (Qatar) Huthaifa Al Salemi
- (Qatar) Othman Al-Yahri
- (United States) Fatai Alashe
- (United States) Julian Green
- (United States) Jerome Kiesewetter
- (United States) Jordan Morris
- (United States) Will Packwood
- (United States) Benji Joya

2 Own goals

- (China) Zhang Xiaobin (for Ivory Coast and England)

1 Own goal

- (China) Cao Haiqing (for Morocco)
