= Stéphane Sparagna =

French footballer (born 1995)

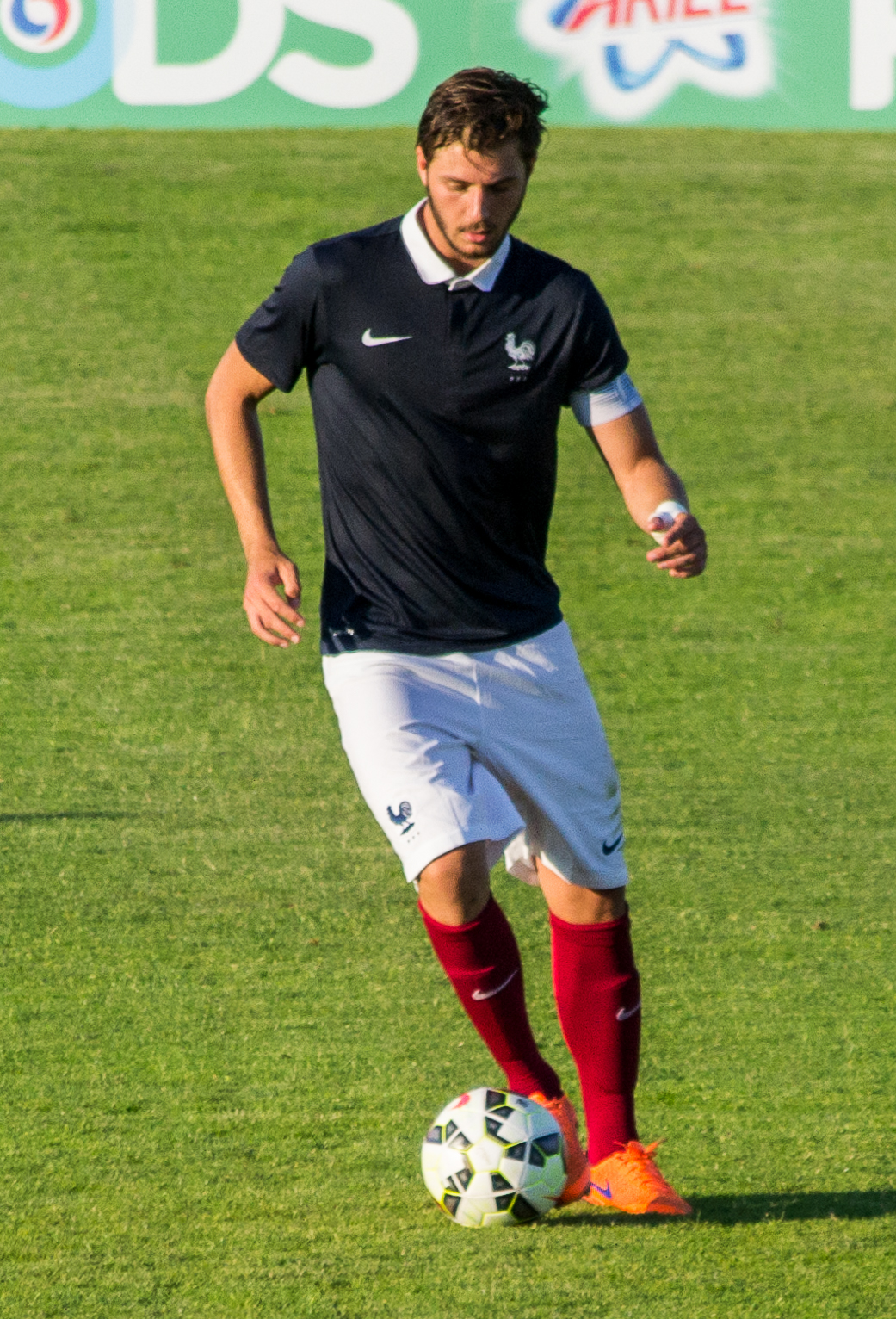
- Sparagna playing for France U20 at the 2015 Toulon Tournament

Personal information
- Full name: Stéphane Didier Christian Sparagna
- Date of birth: 17 February 1995 (age 31)
- Place of birth: Marseille, France
- Height: 1.87 m (6 ft 2 in)
- Positions: Defender; defensive midfielder

Team information
- Current team: Marseille
- Number: 33

Youth career
- 2002–2014: Marseille

Senior career*
Years	Team	Apps	(Gls)
2014–2016	Marseille B	20	(2)
2014–2017	Marseille	12	(0)
2016–2017	→ Auxerre (loan)	29	(0)
2017–2020	Boavista	26	(0)
2020–2021	Vilafranquense	27	(1)
2021–2023	Red Star	12	(0)
2023–2024	Aubagne	8	(1)
2024–	Marseille B	11	(1)

International career
2014–2015	France U20	7	(2)
2015	France U21	1	(0)
Medal record
Representing France
Winner	Toulon Tournament	2015
- * Club domestic league appearances and goals as of 11 May 2024

Stéphane Didier Christian Sparagna (born 17 February 1995) is a French professional footballer who plays as a defender or defensive midfielder for Championnat National 3 club Marseille B.

Sparagna is an academy graduate of French side Marseille and made his senior debut for the club in August 2014, aged 19. In 2016, he joined Ligue 2 outfit Auxerre on a season-long loan before signing for Boavista on a permanent deal the following year. There, he spent two-and-a-half seasons before joining Vilafranquense.

Sparagna also represented France at youth level and captained the France U20 team to victory in the 2015 Toulon Tournament, scoring the winning goal in the final in the process. He also made a solitary appearance for the U21 side.

== Club career ==
=== Marseille ===
Having joined Marseille's academy at the age of seven, Stéphane Sparagna spent his formative years developing his game in the club's La Commanderie academy. His progression into the first team was halted in September 2013, however, when he was forced to undergo surgery following a meniscus injury to his right knee which ruled him out for several months. Upon recovery, and following the appointment of former Argentina coach Marcelo Bielsa as manager, Sparagna made his noncompetitive debut for Marseille alongside fellow academy graduate Jérémie Porsan-Clemente in a friendly clash with Benfica in July 2014.

He was handed his Ligue 1 debut by Bielsa on the opening day of the 2014–15 season in a 3–3 draw with Bastia. Sparagna started the match before being substituted at half-time for Brazilian Lucas Mendes with Marseille leading 2–1. He went on to make three further appearances for the senior side during the campaign, amassing a total of 73 minutes of playing time as Marseille ended the season in fourth place. At the end of the season Sparagna signed his first professional contract with l'OM, ending months of speculation linking him with a Bosman move to Premier League club Arsenal. Having lost Mathieu Flamini to Arsenal on a Bosman deal in 2008, Marseille were prompt to conclude a new deal with Sparagna in order to avoid a repeat occurrence.

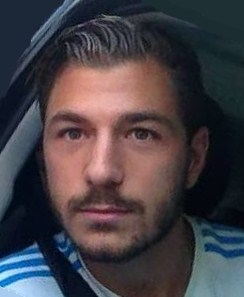
Sparagna with Marseille in 2015

Sparagna featured prominently during the pre-season and started in Marseille's 2–0 win over Juventus in the annual Robert Louis-Dreyfus Trophy. He made his first competitive appearance of the 2015–16 campaign in an opening day defeat to Caen where he was booked in the 82nd minute of the match for a foul on Herve Bazile. On 17 September 2015 Sparagna made his Europa League debut in a 3–0 win over Eredivisie side Groningen. Exactly three months later he made his Coupe de la Ligue debut in a 3–2 win over Ligue 2 side Bourg-en-Bresse. During the match Sparagna was booked and gave away two penalties, both of which were converted by Lakdar Boussaha. Sparagna started the new year by making his Coupe de France debut on 3 January 2016, coming on as a late substitute for the injured Paolo De Ceglie in a penalty shoot-out win over Caen.

He was demoted to the reserve side soon thereafter by manager Míchel, who had replaced Bielsa early in the season, and made only one more senior appearance for the campaign. Much of his absence in the second half of the season also came as a result of him suffering from glue ear, a condition which traps liquid behind the eardrum and affects hearing. Míchel confirmed that Sparagna had been suffering from the condition since the start of the season and had unsuccessfully undergone treatment in late 2015. In April he began a new cortisone treatment but was unable to return to the pitch for fear that he would fall short of doping regulations as a result of the medication. Míchel later revealed that his reluctance to play Sparagna, despite the risks involved had he done so, ultimately contributed towards him being sacked by Vincent Labrune and Margarita Louis-Dreyfus, who at the time were the president and owner of the club respectively. Sparagna ultimately made 15 appearances across all competitions as Marseille ended the season in 13th position in Ligue 1 and as runners-up in the Coupe de France.

==== Loan to Auxerre ====
Following his lack of game time in the campaign before, Sparagna admitted during the off-season that he was considering a short term move away from Marseille in order to continue his development. On 24 July 2016, Ligue 2 side Auxerre announced that they had completed the signing of Sparagna on a season-long loan from Marseille, with no option of purchase being included in the deal. He made his debut for the club in their opening Ligue 2 game on 30 July 2016, playing the full 90 minutes in a 0–0 draw with Red Star. On 19 August, Sparagna was sent off in the 92nd minute of a 1–0 loss to Clermont for committing a second bookable offence. It was the first time in his career that he had been dismissed at senior club level. The Ligue 2 disciplinary committee later handed Sparagna a three-match ban for his indiscretions, included in which was a one-match suspended sentence. On 21 October, having set up Gaëtan Courtet for Auxerre's equaliser just minutes before, Sparagna netted the first own goal of his career in the 83rd minute of the match to hand Strasbourg a 2–1 win. He made 33 appearances across all competitions as Auxerre ended the Ligue 2 campaign in 17th position, one place above the relegation play-offs, before returning to Marseille at the end of the season.

=== Boavista ===
On 19 June 2017, Sparagna signed a three-year contract with Portuguese club Boavista. It was reported that Marseille agreed to terminate Sparagna's contract prematurely in order for him to join Boavista, with the condition that they receive a percentage of any fee received by the Portuguese club for his future sale. He made his debut for the club on 27 August, starting in a 1–0 win over Desportivo Aves which saw Boavista register their first win of the season. He ultimately made 23 appearances for the campaign before his season was cut short by a knee injury which required him to undergo surgery in Marseille.

A spate of injuries sidelined Sparagna for large parts of the first half of the following season and, by the turn of the year, he had made only three league appearances. He made his long-awaited return, and only other appearance for the season, on 19 April 2019 but scored an own goal to consign Boavista to a 1–0 defeat to Tondela. That proved to be his final appearance for the club as in January 2020, having not been registered by Boavista for the 2019–20 Primeira Liga campaign, he was allowed to leave the club on a free transfer.

=== Vilafranquense ===
On 19 January 2020, having not played a single game during the first half of the campaign, Sparagna completed a free transfer to LigaPro side Vilafranquense where he signed a six-month deal, with the option of a further year. He scored his first professional club goal in March when he netted for his side in a 3–2 win over Porto B, snapping a three-match winless run for Vilafranquense in the process.

=== Red Star ===
On 24 August 2021, Sparagna returned to France and signed with Red Star in the Championnat National, the third-tier of French football.

== International career ==
=== Youth teams ===
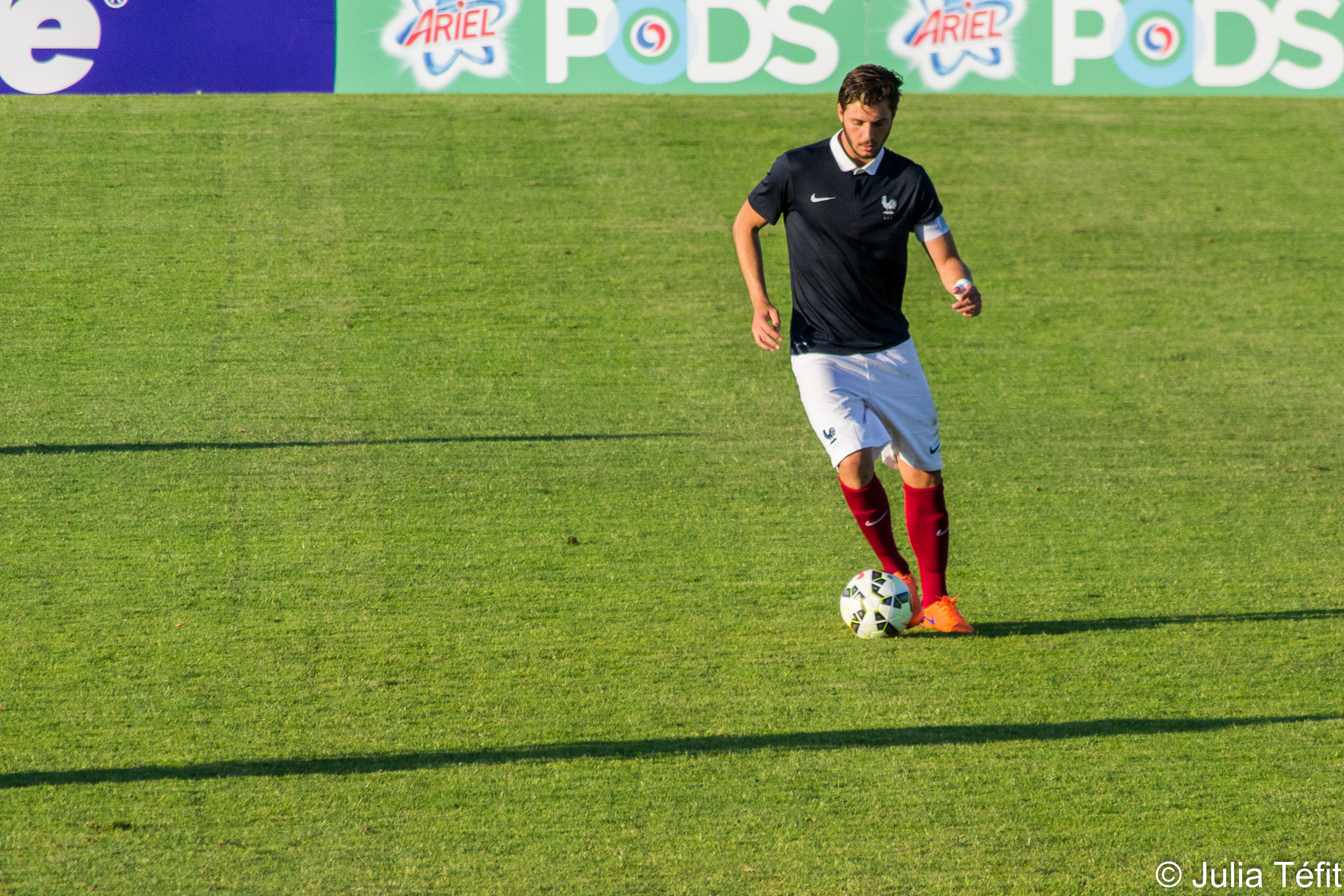
Sparagna at the 2015 Toulon Tournament

On 7 June 2015, Sparagna captained the France U20 squad to victory in the 2015 edition of the annual Toulon Tournament, scoring the winning goal from a Romain Habran corner in the final against Morocco. In doing so, he led France to their first victory in the tournament since 2008. Prior to scoring in the final, Sparagna had also netted from a free-kick in a 3–1 win over the United States in the tournament's opening game. Following his success at U20 level, he was awarded his debut for France U21 on 15 November 2015 but was sent off for two bookable offences in a 2–2 draw with Macedonia.

== Style of play ==
In the early years of his career, Sparagna was described as an athletic and combative centre-back, with his uncompromising approach to tackling drawing comparisons to the likes of Sergio Ramos and Thiago Silva. Marseille's former director for youth recruitment, Georges Prost, described him as a real competitor capable of controlled aggression and precision.

== Personal life ==
On 10 May 2016, Sparagna took part in the second edition of the Marseille Live Poker Tournament, a tournament hosted by the club and broadcast in conjunction with online Poker company, Winamax. He finished the tournament in 19th position, the highest of any of the Marseille players who took part.

== Career statistics ==
As of 11 May 2024

Appearances and goals by club, season and competition
Club	Season	League			National cup		League cup		Europe		Total	
Club	Season	Division	Apps	Goals	Apps	Goals	Apps	Goals	Apps	Goals	Apps	Goals
Marseille B	2014–15	CFA 2	12	0	—		—		—		12	0
Marseille B	2015–16	CFA	8	2	—		—		—		8	2
Marseille B	Total		20	2	—		—		—		20	0
Marseille	2014–15	Ligue 1	4	0	0	0	0	0	0	0	4	0
Marseille	2015–16	Ligue 1	8	0	1	0	2	0	4 (Note: Appearances in UEFA Europa League)	0	15	0
Marseille	Total		12	0	1	0	2	0	4	0	19	0
Auxerre (loan)	2016–17	Ligue 2	29	0	2	0	2	0	—		33	0
Boavista	2017–18	Primeira Liga	22	0	0	0	1	0	—		23	0
Boavista	2018–19	Primeira Liga	4	0	0	0	0	0	—		4	0
Boavista	2019–20	Primeira Liga	0	0	0	0	0	0	—		0	0
Boavista	Total		26	0	0	0	1	0	0	0	27	0
Vilafranquense	2019–20	LigaPro	2	1	0	0	0	0	—		2	1
Vilafranquense	2020–21	LigaPro	25	0	2	0	0	0	—		27	0
Vilafranquense	Total		27	1	2	0	0	0	0	0	29	1
Red Star	2021–22	Championnat National	12	0	1	0	0	0	—		13	0
Red Star	2022–23	Championnat National	0	0	0	0	0	0	—		0	0
Red Star	Total		12	0	1	0	0	0	0	0	13	0
Aubagne	2023–24	Championnat National 2	8	1	—		—		—		8	1
Marseille B	2023–24	Championnat National 3	7	0	—		—		—		7	0
Career total			141	5	6	0	5	0	4	0	156	5

== Honours ==
Marseille

- Coupe de France runner-up: 2015–16

France U20

- Toulon Tournament: 2015
