= Marc Pelosi =

American retired soccer player (born 1994)

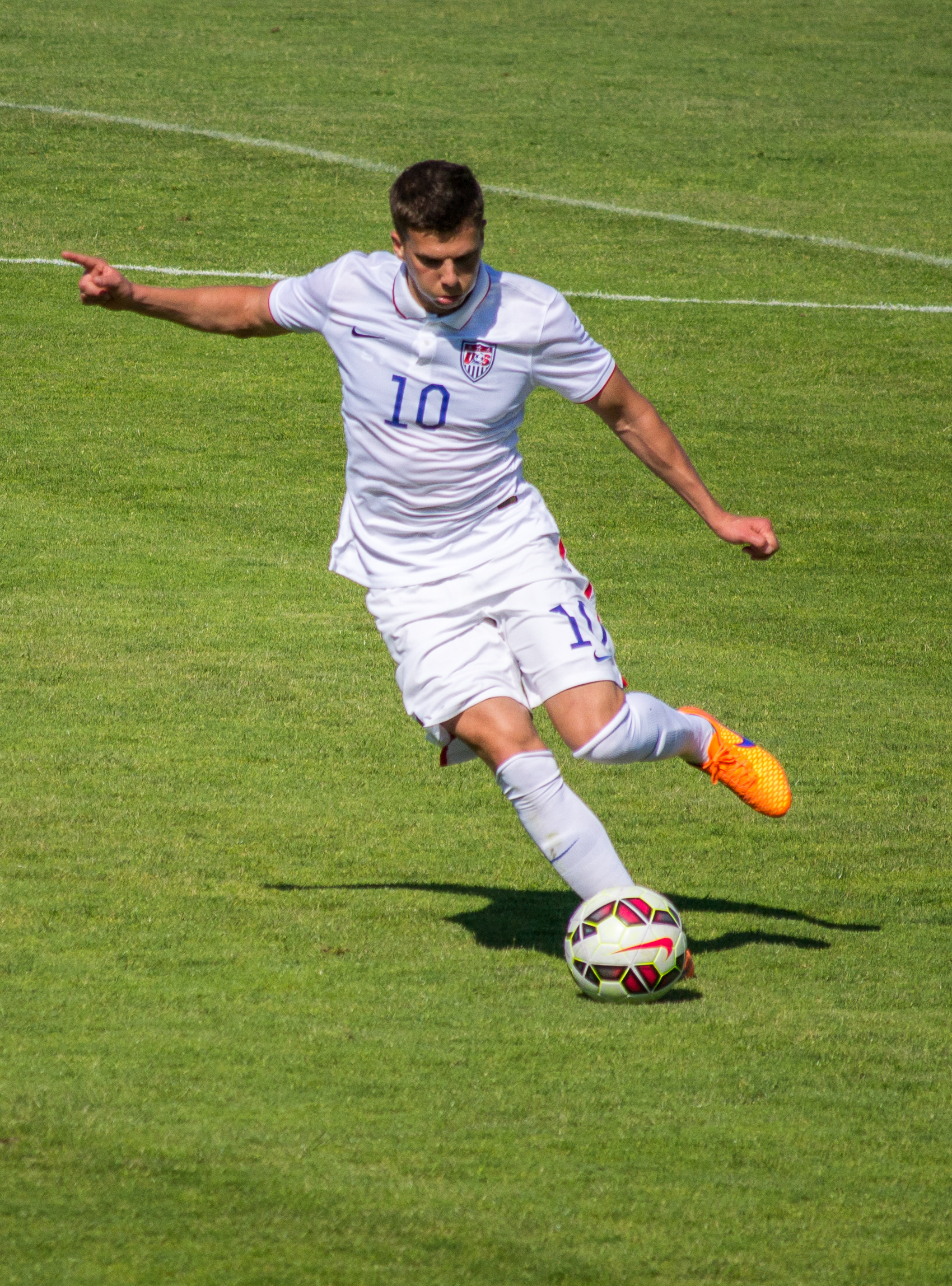
- Pelosi with the United States U23 at the 2015 Toulon Tournament

Personal information
- Full name: Marc Anthony Pelosi
- Date of birth: June 17, 1994 (age 32)
- Place of birth: Bad Säckingen, Germany
- Height: 1.83 m (6 ft 0 in)
- Position: Midfielder

Youth career
- 2001–2011: De Anza Force
- 2011–2015: Liverpool

Senior career*
Years	Team	Apps	(Gls)
2015–2017	San Jose Earthquakes	12	(0)
2017	→ Reno 1868 (loan)	4	(0)

International career
2009–2011	United States U17	28	(8)
2012	United States U20	3	(0)
2015	United States U23	8	(0)
- * Club domestic league appearances and goals

Marc Anthony Pelosi (born June 17, 1994) is an American former professional soccer player who played as a midfielder.

== Career ==
=== Youth ===
Pelosi was born in Bad Säckingen, Germany, but moved to California during his youth and spent years with U.S. Soccer Development Academy club De Anza Force Academy in the San Francisco Bay Area. On November 8, 2011, Pelosi joined Premier League side Liverpool. On February 17, 2013, in a match for the under-21 team, Pelosi suffered a double fracture on his right leg that ruled him out for over a year. He signed a new contract with the club while recuperating from his injury; however, he was released by the club at the end of that contract on June 10, 2015.

=== Professional ===
On July 17, 2015, Pelosi returned to the US and signed with his hometown MLS side San Jose Earthquakes. He made his professional debut on July 26 in a 3–1 defeat to Vancouver Whitecaps FC. Pelosi was sidelined for the entirety of the 2016 season due to knee issues and did not return to the squad until appearing off the bench in the 63rd minute during San Jose's 4–1 friendly victory over Eintracht Frankfurt on July 14, 2017. Following this appearance, Pelosi appeared on loan at Reno 1868 FC, named to the bench in the team's August 12 match against San Antonio FC. He was released by San Jose on November 27, 2017.

=== International ===
Pelosi represented the United States in every youth level. He was the captain for the under-17 national team at the 2011 FIFA U-20 World Cup. He was also a member of the under-23 side that took third place in the 2015 Toulon Tournament.

On January 9, 2015, Pelosi received his first senior call up for friendlies against Chile and Panama, but he did not feature in either of the matches.

== Personal life ==
Marc Pelosi is a distant relative of Paul Pelosi, husband of the former Speaker of the House, Nancy Pelosi, although the two have never formally met. After retiring, he moved to Park City, Utah, where he invests in cryptocurrency, real estate, and private equity.

Pelosi attended high school at Bellarmine College Preparatory for a year before transferring to IMG Academy. He turned down an offer from UCLA to sign with Liverpool.

== Honors ==
United States U17

- CONCACAF U-17 Championship: 2011
