= Maki Tall =

American soccer player (born 1995)

Personal information
- Full name: Maki Madani Tall
- Date of birth: October 30, 1995 (age 31)
- Place of birth: Washington, D.C., United States
- Height: 1.73 m (5 ft 8 in)
- Position: Forward

Team information
- Current team: Barœul
- Number: 9

Youth career
- 2004–2008: Génération Foot
- 2008–2009: Club La Pépinière
- 2009–2013: Le Mans
- 2013–2014: Lille

Senior career*
Years	Team	Apps	(Gls)
2014–2015	Lille B	14	(0)
2015	→ Red Star (loan)	2	(0)
2015–2016	Sion II	3	(0)
2016–2018	Tours B	23	(13)
2016–2018	Tours	19	(2)
2018–2020	Ajaccio	0	(0)
2019–2020	Ajaccio B	9	(3)
2020–2022	Francs Borains	8	(0)
2022–2023	KVC Winkel Sport	31	(6)
2023–	Barœul	4	(4)

International career
2013	France U18	5	(2)
2013	France U19	3	(0)
2014	Ivory Coast U20	1	(1)
2015	United States U20	3	(3)
2015	United States U23	2	(0)
- * Club domestic league appearances and goals as of 15:27, 11 November 2023 (UTC)

Maki Madani Tall (born October 30, 1995) is an American professional soccer player who plays as a forward who plays for Barœul.

Born in the United States, Tall is of Ivorian descent. He has represented France, the Ivory Coast, and the United States at youth international level.

== Club career ==
Tall first joined Génération Foot in 2004, when he and his family were living in Senegal. Four years later, he moved to Ivory Coast and joined local Abidjan-based side Club La Pépinière. It was during this time in Ivory Coast that he began trialing with a number of French clubs. He eventually joined Le Mans as an under-15, and excelled at youth level, finishing numerous youth seasons as his side's top scorer.

He signed a professional contract with Lille in 2013, amid rumours that Le Mans were going to go bankrupt. In 2015 he was loaned to Championnat National side Red Star on a six-month loan, but only managed 2 appearances, totaling 15 minutes, before returning to Lille.

Tall joined Swiss side FC Sion in July 2015 from Lille. However, he only featured for the club's 'B' team, before being released a year later in July 2016.

Preceding his release from Sion, he returned to France to join Tours, where he spent a highly successful 2016–17 season with the club's 'B' team, scoring 10 times in 18 appearances. He was given his first team professional debut on the last day of the season, replacing Cheick Fantamady Diarra after 54 minutes against AC Ajaccio. Despite his team losing the game 3–2, Tall was credited for a good performance, which he capped by scoring a debut goal.

In September 2018, he joined AC Ajaccio on a free transfer.

On July 24, 2020, Tall signed with Belgian National Division 1 side Francs Borains. In January 2022 his contract was terminated by mutual consent.

On January 31, 2022, Tall signed with Sint-Eloois-Winkel Sport. He scored his first goal for Winkel Sport against RFC Liége on March 6, 2022.

On July 14, 2023, Tall signed with Olympique Marcq-en-Barœul of the Championnat National 2, the fourth level of the French football pyramid.

== International career ==
Tall is eligible to represent Ivory Coast, France and the United States, and has featured for all three at youth level. He played five games for the France under-18 side and three for the under-19s, totaling 2 goals. He was called up to the Ivory Coast under-20 side for a training camp in December 2014, and scored in a friendly against Senegal.

He marked his debut for the United States under-20 side with a goal in a 2–1 away friendly loss to England U20 in March 2015. He represented the United States at the 2015 FIFA U-20 World Cup, scoring against Myanmar before injury forced him to miss the remainder of the tournament.

He has also represented the United States at under-23 level, featuring in two qualifying games for the 2016 Summer Olympics against Cuba and Panama.
