= Alonso Hernández =

American soccer player

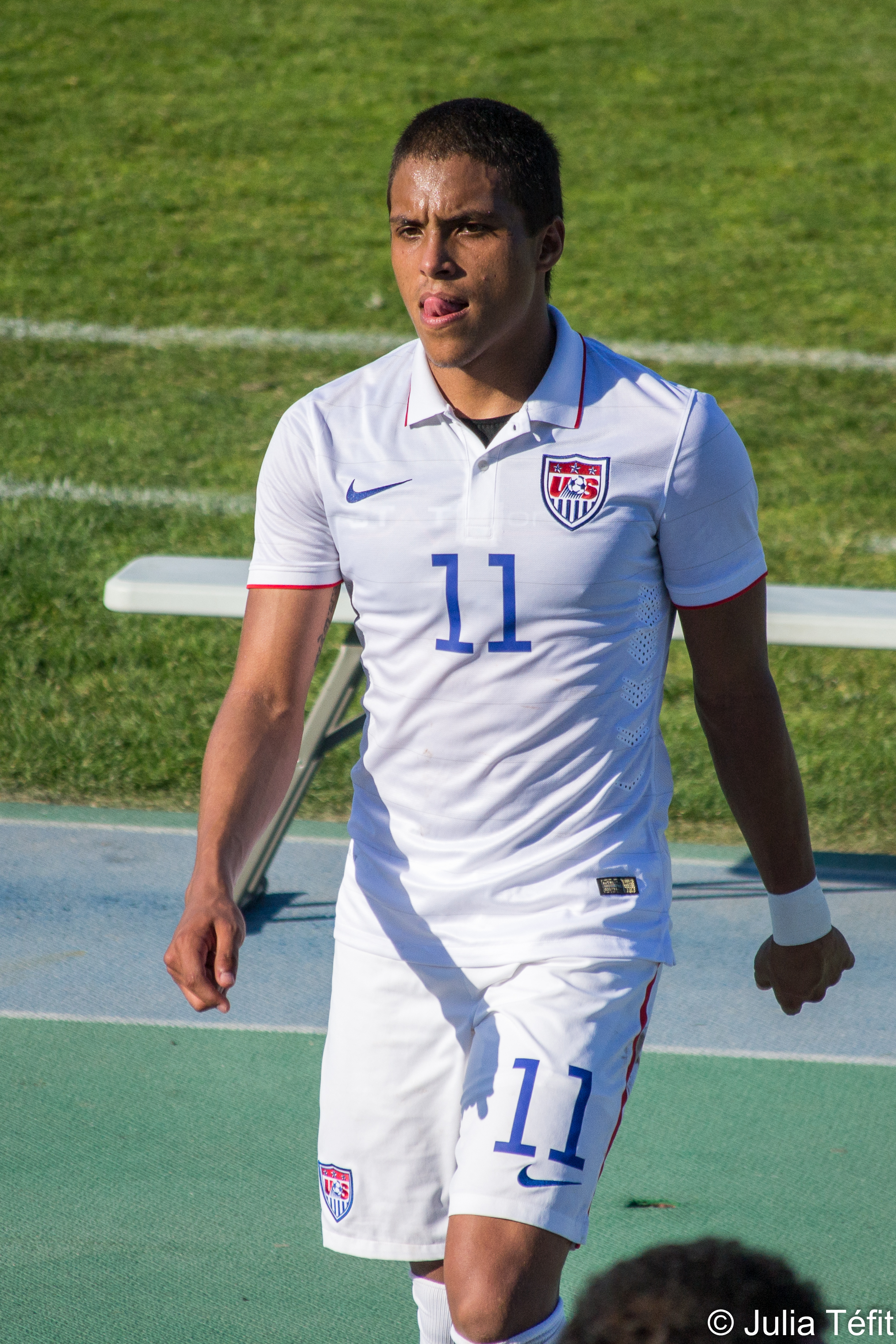
- Hernández with the United States U23 at the 2015 Toulon Tournament

Personal information
- Full name: Joaquín Alonso Hernández García
- Date of birth: March 1, 1994 (age 32)
- Place of birth: El Paso, Texas, United States
- Height: 1.79 m (5 ft 10 in)
- Position: Forward

Team information
- Current team: Municipal Liberia
- Number: 17

Youth career
- 2010: Indios

Senior career*
Years	Team	Apps	(Gls)
2010–2012	Indios	2	(0)
2012–2017	Monterrey	7	(0)
2015–2016	→ Juárez (loan)	17	(0)
2017	→ Monterrey Premier (loan)	?	(13)
2018	Atlético Reynosa	14	(3)
2018–2019	UAT	24	(7)
2019	Sonora	13	(2)
2020	Oaxaca	6	(0)
2021–2022	Atlante	23	(2)
2022	Oaxaca	9	(2)
2023	UdeG	14	(4)
2023–2025	Guanacasteca	48	(17)
2025–	Municipal Liberia	0	(0)

International career
2013	United States U20	4	(1)
2014–2015	United States U23	12	(4)
- * Club domestic league appearances and goals as of 19:56, 26 December 2024 (UTC)

Joaquín Alonso Hernández García (born March 1, 1994) is an American professional soccer player who plays as a forward for Guanacasteca.

== Club career ==
Hernandez began his youth career in the city of El Paso, Texas. His rising talent increased his chances of professional football, so he relocated to Ciudad Juarez, Mexico to pursue this goal, where he made his start in the Indios youth system. Hernandez moved up the ranks at Indios and made two brief appearances with the first team in the Liga de Ascenso during the 2010–11 season.

In December 2011, however, Indios was disbanded, and Hernandez, out of a club, found a home with C.F. Monterrey, where he joined the Rayados' U-17 team.

Hernandez moved up to Monterrey's U-20 team for his first full season with the club. On April 19, 2013, he was called up to the first team and made his Liga MX debut.

Hernandez went on loan to Juárez in Ascenso MX in 2015–2016. He then played for Monterrey Premier for 2016–2017 and led the league in goals with 15.

== Honors ==
Atlante

- Liga de Expansión MX: Apertura 2021
