= Ulrich N'Nomo =

French footballer (born 1996)

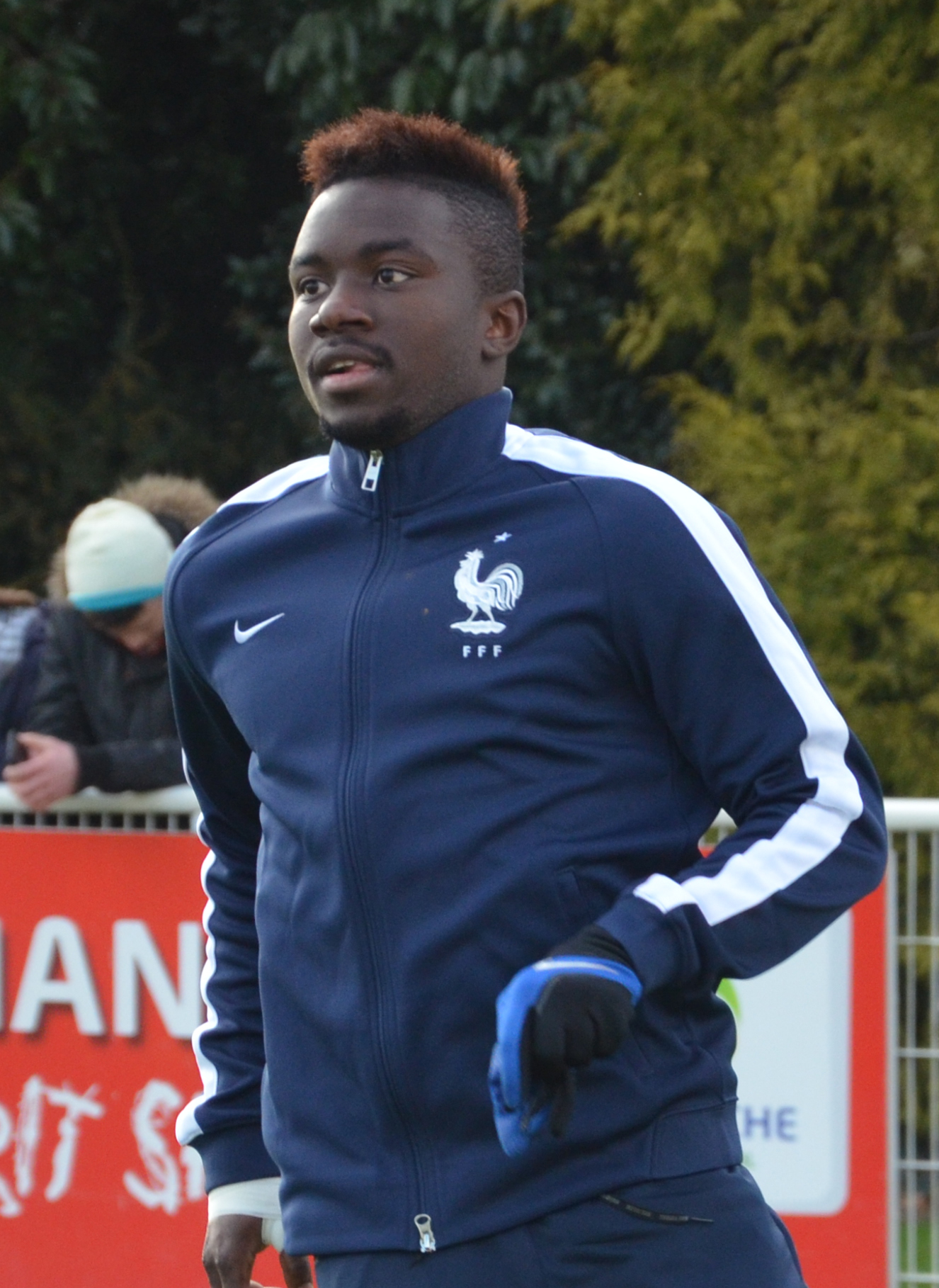
- N'Nomo in 2015

Personal information
- Full name: Jean-Marie Ulrich N'Nomo N'Gong
- Date of birth: 28 February 1996 (age 30)
- Place of birth: Yaoundé, Cameroon
- Height: 1.73 m (5 ft 8 in)
- Position: Striker

Team information
- Current team: AER Afantou

Youth career
- 2005–2011: Centre Formation Paris
- 2011–2014: Châteauroux

Senior career*
Years	Team	Apps	(Gls)
2013–2016	Châteauroux II	39	(14)
2014–2016	Châteauroux	40	(7)
2016–2017	Leyton Orient	6	(0)
2017–2018	Gil Vicente	0	(0)
2018	Panserraikos	16	(6)
2018–2019	Tours	22	(1)
2019–2021	Levadiakos	28	(3)
2021–2022	Apollon Pontus	27	(6)
2022–2023	Valletta	20	(3)
2023–2024	Aiolikos	26	(6)
2024–2025	Ilioupoli	12	(0)
2025–2026	Egaleo	33	(2)
2026–	AER Afantou		

International career
2012	France U16	4	(2)
2013	France U17	2	(0)
2014–2015	France U19	8	(3)
2015	France U20	5	(2)
- * Club domestic league appearances and goals as of 26 April 2026

Jean-Marie Ulrich N'Nomo N'Gong (born 28 February 1996), commonly known simply as Ulrich N'Nomo, is a professional footballer who plays as a striker for Gamma Ethniki club AER Afantou. Born in Cameroon, he has represented France at youth level.
