= Ousmane Ouattara =

Ivorian footballer

Personal information
- Full name: Ousmane Adama Ouattara
- Date of birth: 22 December 1993 (age 32)
- Place of birth: Bouna, Ivory Coast
- Height: 1.86 m (6 ft 1 in)
- Position: Centre-back

Youth career
- ASEC Mimosas

Senior career*
Years	Team	Apps	(Gls)
2010–2015	Séwé FC		
2015–2016	Smouha SC	4	
2016–2017	Oyah Sports FC		
2017–2019	FC San Pédro		
2019–2021	AS Vita Club		
2021-2023	US Monastir	42	(2)
2023	Al-Arabi		
2023–2025	Stade Tunisien	20	(1)
2025–2026	Al-Shomooa	3	

International career^{‡}
2014–2015	Ivory Coast U23	4	(1)
2014–2022	Ivory Coast	1	(1)
- * Club domestic league appearances and goals as of 23:42, 19 March 2026 (UTC) ‡ National team caps and goals as of 06:41, 13 March 2026 (UTC)

Ousmane Adama Ouattara (born 22 December 1993) is an Ivorian professional footballer who plays as a centre-back.

== Career ==
Ouattara began his senior career in the Ivory Coast with Séwé FC. After 5 years there, and a couple of Ivory Coast Ligue 1 titles he moved to the Egyptian club Smouha SC, followed with a stint at the Nigerian club Oyah Sports FC. He returned to the Ivory Coast with FC San Pédro. In the beginning of the 2019 season, he moved to the Congolese side AS Vita Club. He was named as AS Vita's best player of the year for the 2019–20 season.

== International career ==
Ouattara debuted with the Ivory Coast national team in a 1–1 friendly tie with Zambia on 25 October 2014, scoring his side's only goal.

== Honours ==
Séwé FC

- Ivory Coast Ligue 1: 2012–13, 2013–2014
