= Othman Al-Yahri =

Qatari footballer (born 1993)

Personal information
- Full name: Othman Alawi Al-Yahri
- Date of birth: 24 June 1993 (age 33)
- Place of birth: Qatar
- Position: Winger

Youth career
- Muaither

Senior career*
Years	Team	Apps	(Gls)
2012–2025	Al Gharafa	165	(13)
2015–2016	→ El Jaish (loan)	18	(0)
2024–2025	→ Umm Salal (loan)	15	(1)
2025–2026	Al Ahli	0	(0)

International career
- Qatar U23
- * Club domestic league appearances and goals

Othman Al-Yahri (Arabic:عثمان اليهري) (born 24 June 1993) is a Qatari footballer. He currently plays as a winger.
