= Romain Habran =

French footballer (born 1994)

Personal information
- Full name: Romain Habran
- Date of birth: 14 June 1994 (age 32)
- Place of birth: Villeneuve-la-Garenne, France
- Height: 1.76 m (5 ft 9 1/2 in)
- Position: Winger

Team information
- Current team: PT Prachuap

Youth career
- 2000–2002: Gennevilliers CSM
- 2002–2003: Racing Colombes 92
- 2003–2009: Paris Saint-Germain
- 2009–2011: Racing Colombes 92
- 2011–2014: Paris Saint-Germain

Senior career*
Years	Team	Apps	(Gls)
2012–2017	Paris Saint-Germain B	34	(6)
2014–2015	→ Sochaux (loan)	23	(2)
2015–2016	→ Laval (loan)	26	(0)
2017	→ Boulogne (loan)	13	(1)
2018	Royal Antwerp	8	(0)
2018–2019	Ashdod	24	(2)
2019–2020	Gimnàstic	16	(1)
2020	→ Melilla (loan)	5	(1)
2021	FK Sūduva	23	(6)
2022–2024	Hapoel Afula	61	(13)
2024–2025	Hapoel Acre	13	(1)
2025	F.C. Kafr Qasim	7	(2)
2025	PT Prachuap	5	(0)

International career
2015	France U20	5	(1)
- * Club domestic league appearances and goals as of 1 January 2026

Romain Habran (born 14 June 1994) is a French footballer who plays as a winger for Thai club PT Prachuap. Besides France, he has played in Belgium, Israel, and Spain.

== Club career ==
Habran joined FC Sochaux-Montbéliard in 2014, on loan from Paris Saint-Germain. He made his Ligue 2 debut at the opening day of the 2014–15 season against US Orléans.

A year later, he was once again loaned in Ligue 2, joining Stade Lavallois. He went on to make 26 league appearances for the club.

In August 2018, after one year with Royal Antwerp, he signed a three years contract with Ashdod.

On 27 January 2022 signed for Hapoel Afula.

== Career statistics ==
As of match played 11 March 2018

Appearances and goals by club, season and competition
Club	Season	League			National Cup		League Cup		Other		Total	
Club	Season	Division	Apps	Goals	Apps	Goals	Apps	Goals	Apps	Goals	Apps	Goals
Paris Saint-Germain II	2011–12	CFA	1	0	—		—		—		1	0
Paris Saint-Germain II	2012–13	CFA	22	4	—		—		—		22	4
Paris Saint-Germain II	2016–17	CFA	9	2	—		—		—		9	2
Paris Saint-Germain II	2017–18	National 2	2	0	—		—		—		2	0
Paris Saint-Germain II	Total		34	6	—		—		—		34	6
Sochaux (loan)	2014–15	Ligue 2	23	2	0	0	1	0	—		24	2
Sochaux II (loan)	2014–15	CFA	2	0	—		—		—		2	0
Laval (loan)	2015–16	Ligue 2	26	0	2	0	2	0	—		30	0
Laval II (loan)	2015–16	CFA 2	3	1	—		—		—		3	1
Boulogne (loan)	2016–17	National	13	1	0	0	0	0	—		13	1
Antwerp	2017–18	First Division A	2	0	0	0	—		0	0	2	0
Career total			103	10	2	0	3	0	0	0	108	10
