= Jerome Kiesewetter =

American soccer player

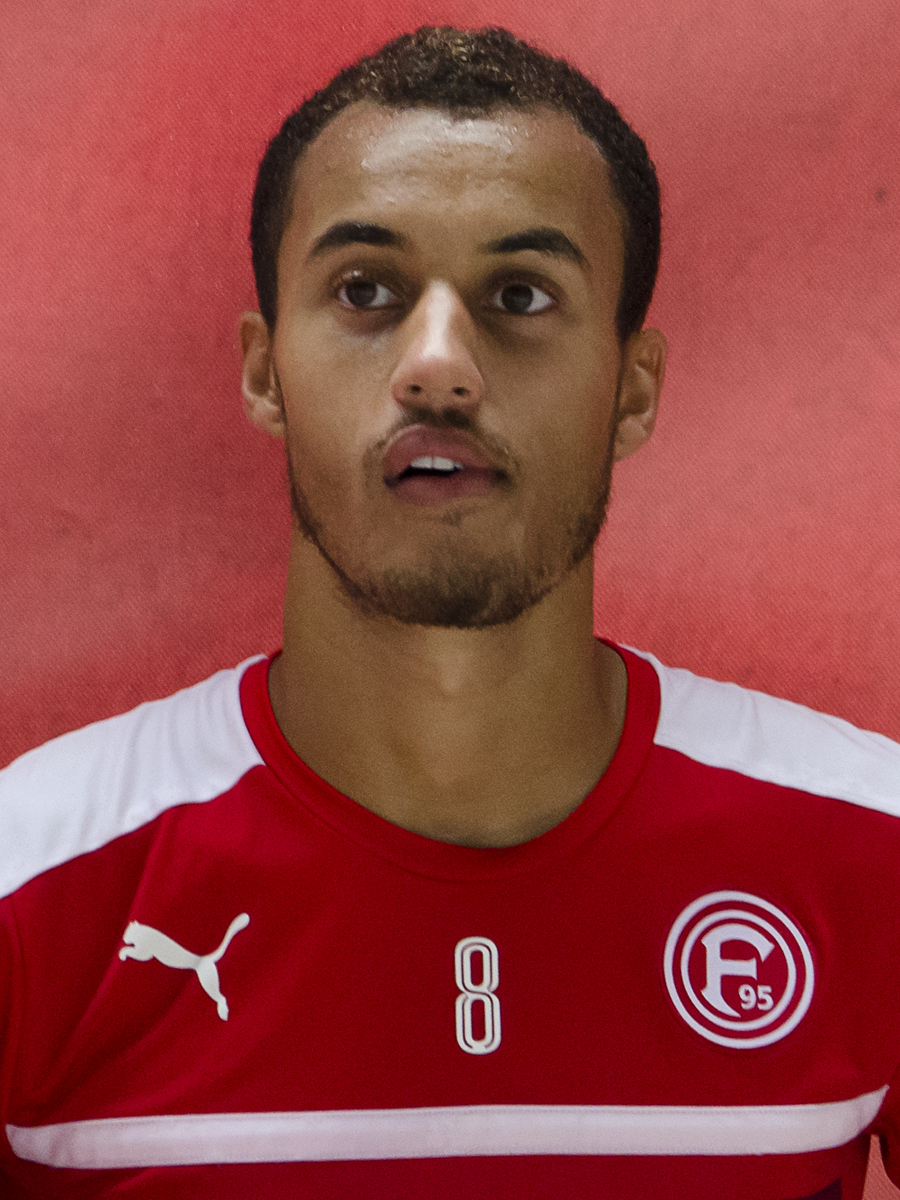
- Kiesewetter with Fortuna Düsseldorf in 2016

Personal information
- Full name: Jerome Julien Kiesewetter
- Date of birth: February 9, 1993 (age 33)
- Place of birth: Berlin, Germany
- Height: 1.75 m (5 ft 9 in)
- Position: Forward

Youth career
- Hertha Zehlendorf
- 2007–2011: Hertha BSC

Senior career*
| Years | Team | Apps | (Gls) |
| 2011–2012 | Hertha BSC II | 17 | (2) |
| 2012–2016 | VfB Stuttgart II | 62 | (5) |
| 2012–2016 | VfB Stuttgart | 2 | (0) |
| 2014 | → Hertha BSC II (loan) | 15 | (2) |
| 2016–2018 | Fortuna Düsseldorf | 21 | (2) |
| 2017–2018 | Fortuna Düsseldorf II | 11 | (2) |
| 2019 | El Paso Locomotive | 28 | (12) |
| 2020 | Inter Miami | 2 | (0) |
| 2020 | → Fort Lauderdale CF (loan) | 7 | (1) |
| 2021 | FC Tulsa | 9 | (0) |
| 2021 | → Sacramento Republic (loan) | 11 | (1) |
| 2022 | New Mexico United | 19 | (2) |

International career^{‡}
| 2011 | United States U18 | 3 | (2) |
| 2010–2013 | United States U20 | 8 | (0) |
| 2011–2016 | United States U23 | 18 | (6) |
| 2016 | United States | 2 | (0) |
Medal record
Representing United States
| Runner-up | CONCACAF U-20 Championship | 2013 |
- * Club domestic league appearances and goals as of October 21, 2022 ‡ National team caps and goals as of 5 February 2016

Jerome Julien Kiesewetter (born February 9, 1993) is a former professional soccer player who played as a forward. Born in Germany, he represented the United States national team.

== Club career ==
In May 2012, Kiesewetter signed a four-year contract with VfB Stuttgart. He made his debut for VfB Stuttgart II on September 25, 2012, in the 3. Liga against Hansa Rostock. In January 2014, he was loaned out to Hertha BSC II until the end of the season. In March 2015, Kiesewetter made his Bundesliga debut for VfB Stuttgart against Hertha BSC. In June 2016, he moved to Fortuna Düsseldorf, where he signed a two-year contract. In April 2019, Kiesewetter signed for American club El Paso Locomotive FC of the USL Championship.

In November 2019, Kiesewetter joined Major League Soccer expansion side Inter Miami CF ahead of their inaugural 2020 season. On September 12, 2020, Kiesewetter was loaned to Inter Miami's USL League One affiliate side Fort Lauderdale CF. Miami opted to decline his contract option following the 2020 season.

Kiesewetter signed with USL Championship side FC Tulsa on January 14, 2021. After struggling for goals during the season, Kiesewetter moved on loan to fellow USL Championship side Sacramento Republic on July 13, 2021, for the remainder of the season.

On January 25, 2022, Kiesewetter joined New Mexico United in a trade that saw Brian Brown join FC Tulsa.

== International career ==
Born in Germany to an African American father and a German mother, Kiesewetter is eligible to play for both Germany and the United States. At the age of 17, Kiesewetter was called for the first time into the United States national under-20 team for a tournament in Peru in September 2010. He made his debut for the U.S. under-20 team on September 6, 2010, against Paraguay. In February 2013, he participated in the CONCACAF Under-20 Championship, appearing twice.

In November 2011, Kiesewetter made his first appearance for the United States national under-23 team against Azerbaijan.

He made his first appearance for the senior United States national team on January 31, 2016, when he came on late as a sub against Iceland in a friendly. His lively play helped tip the game in favor of the United States, 3–2.
