= Stade Léo Lagrange =

Football stadium in Besançon, France

Coordinates: 47.243847°N 6.003274°E

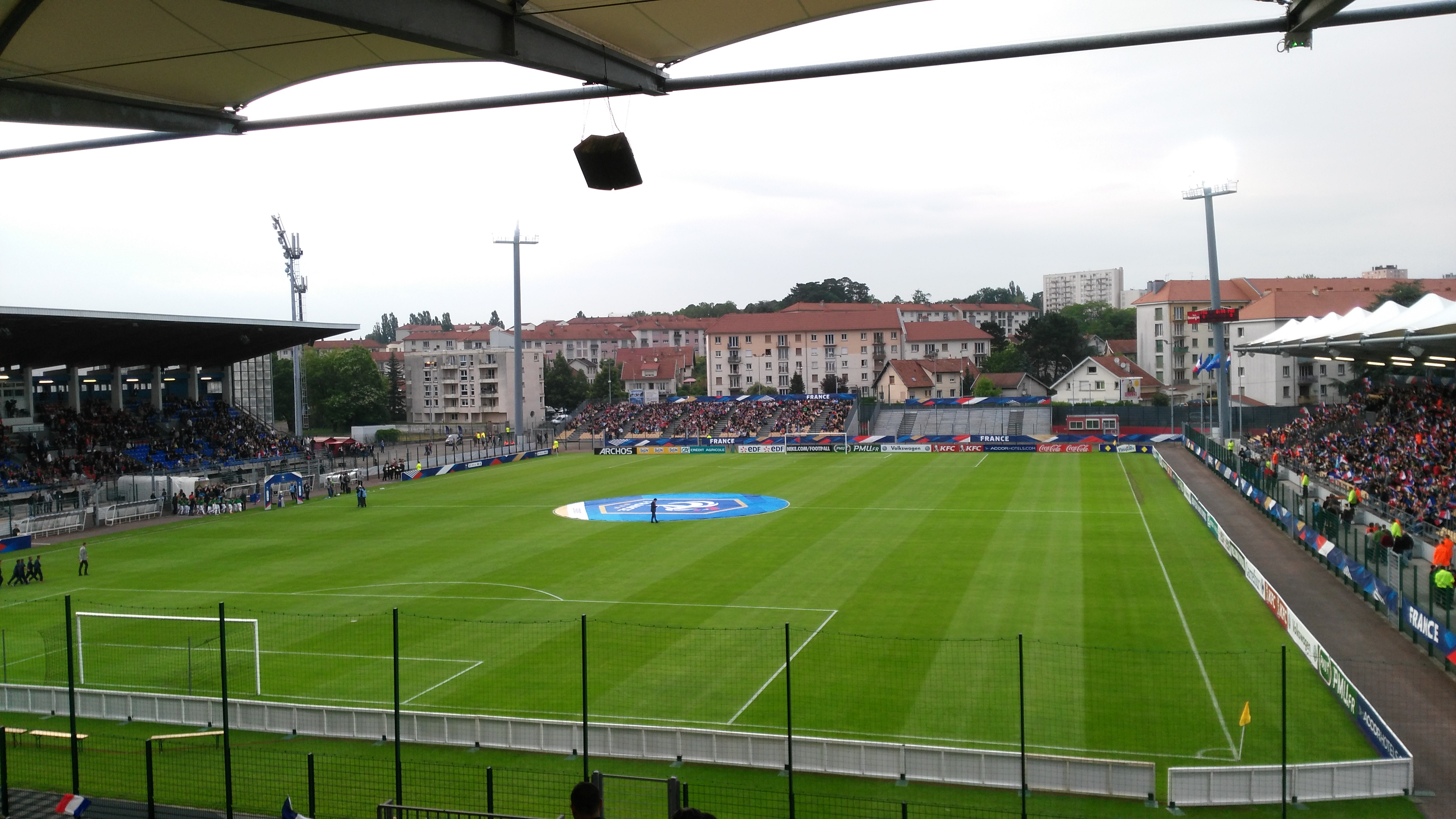
- Interactive map of Stade Léo Lagrange
- Location: Besançon, France
- Capacity: 10,000
- Surface: Grass

Construction
- Opened: 1939
- Renovated: 2003 - 2005

Tenant
- Racing Besançon

Stade Léo Lagrange (French pronunciation: [stad leo laɡʁɑ̃ʒ]) is a football stadium in Besançon, France. Originally constructed as a velodrome in 1939, it is now used for football matches and is the home stadium of Racing Besançon. The stadium holds approximately 10,000 spectators.

On May 7, 2014, the France women's national football team played a World Cup qualifying match against Hungary at Stade Léo Lagrange, winning 4-0.

Preceded by Sloten Velodrome; Amsterdam	UCI Track Cycling World Championships; Venue; 1980	Succeeded by Brno Velodrome; Brno
