= 2013 CONCACAF U-20 Championship squads =

Below are the rosters for the 2013 CONCACAF U-20 Championship held in Mexico from February 18 – March 2, 2013.

== Group A ==
=== United States ===
Coach: (United States) Tab Ramos

No.	Pos.	Player	Date of birth (age)	Caps	Club
1	GK	Cody Cropper	February 16, 1993 (aged 20)		(England) Southampton FC U-21
2	DF	Boyd Okwuonu	February 24, 1993 (aged 19)		(United States) North Carolina
3	DF	Juan Pablo Ocegueda	July 13, 1993 (aged 19)		(Mexico) Tigres de la UANL
4	MF	Caleb Stanko	July 26, 1993 (aged 19)		(Germany) SC Freiburg II
5	DF	Shane O'Neill	September 2, 1993 (aged 19)		(United States) Colorado Rapids
6	MF	Wil Trapp	January 15, 1993 (aged 20)		(United States) Columbus Crew
7	FW	Jose Villarreal	September 10, 1993 (aged 19)		(United States) Los Angeles Galaxy
8	MF	Benji Joya	September 22, 1993 (aged 19)		(Mexico) Santos Laguna
9	FW	Mario Rodríguez	May 12, 1994 (aged 18)		(Germany) Kaiserslautern U-19
10	MF	Luis Gil	November 14, 1993 (aged 19)		(United States) Real Salt Lake
11	FW	Jerome Kiesewetter	February 9, 1993 (aged 20)		(Germany) VfB Stuttgart II
12	GK	Kendall McIntosh	January 24, 1994 (aged 19)		(United States) Santa Clara
14	DF	Javan Torre	October 20, 1993 (aged 19)		(United States) UCLA
15	MF	Mikey Lopez	February 20, 1993 (aged 19)		(United States) Sporting Kansas City
16	MF	Dillon Serna	March 25, 1994 (aged 18)		(United States) Colorado Rapids
17	FW	Danny Garcia	October 14, 1993 (aged 19)		(United States) North Carolina
18	DF	Eric Miller	January 15, 1993 (aged 20)		(United States) Creighton
19	FW	Brandon Allen	October 8, 1993 (aged 19)		(United States) Georgetown
20	FW	Daniel Cuevas	July 29, 1993 (aged 19)		(Mexico) Santos Laguna
22	GK	Zack Steffen	April 2, 1995 (aged 17)		(United States) FC DELCO

=== Costa Rica ===
Coach: (Costa Rica) Jafet Soto

No.	Pos.	Player	Date of birth (age)	Caps	Club
1	GK	Jairo Monge	January 28, 1993 (aged 20)		(Costa Rica) Limón F.C.
18	GK	Bryan Morales	July 4, 1993 (aged 19)		(Costa Rica) Santos de Guápiles
2	DF	Jose Sossa	October 4, 1994 (aged 18)		(Costa Rica) Club Sport Uruguay de Coronado
3	DF	Jhamir Ordain	July 29, 1993 (aged 19)		(Costa Rica) A.D. San Carlos
4	DF	William Fernandez	May 15, 1994 (aged 18)		(United States) University of Carolina
6	DF	Mauricio Núñez	October 28, 1993 (aged 19)		(Costa Rica) C.S. Herediano
13	DF	Steve Garita	September 10, 1993 (aged 19)		(Costa Rica)
19	DF	Jean Carlo	July 6, 1993 (aged 19)		(Costa Rica)
5	DF	Erick Cabalceta	January 9, 1993 (aged 20)		(Italy) Calcio Catania
8	MF	Luis Sequeira	May 11, 1994 (aged 18)		(Costa Rica)
9	MF	Gabriel Leiva	August 27, 1994 (aged 18)		(Argentina) River Plate
14	MF	Rodrigo Garita	December 23, 1993 (aged 19)		(Costa Rica) C.S. Cartaginés
15	MF	Brandon Welleans	March 10, 1994 (aged 18)		(Costa Rica) Santos de Guápiles
16	MF	Fabián Garita	October 14, 1993 (aged 19)		(Costa Rica) C.S. Herediano
7	FW	David Ramírez	May 28, 1993 (aged 19)		(Costa Rica) Deportivo Saprissa
10	FW	Dylan Flores	May 30, 1993 (aged 19)		(Costa Rica)
11	FW	John Jairo Ruíz	January 10, 1994 (aged 19)		(France) Lille OSC
17	FW	Mayron George	October 23, 1993 (aged 19)		(Costa Rica) Limón F.C.
20	FW	Giovanni Cantillano	June 3, 1993 (aged 19)		(Costa Rica) Orión F.C.

=== Haiti ===
Coach: (Cuba) Manuel Navarro Rodriguez

No.	Pos.	Player	Date of birth (age)	Caps	Club
12	GK	Ronald Elusma	September 8, 1993 (aged 19)		(Haiti) Victory SC
1	GK	Marc D. Mervil	January 17, 1993 (aged 20)		(Haiti) Football Inter Club Association
2	DF	Jude St-Louis	June 24, 1993 (aged 19)		(Haiti) Baltimore SC
3	DF	Ismaël J. Voltaire	May 4, 1994 (aged 18)		(Haiti) Don Bosco FC
5	DF	Givemilord Ylosier	February 2, 1996 (aged 17)		(Haiti) Tempête FC
4	DF	Charles Alexandre	December 18, 1994 (aged 18)		(Haiti) AS Capoise
16	DF	Paulson Pierre	July 7, 1993 (aged 19)		(Haiti) Cavaly AS
17	DF	Jean Dany Maurice	November 27, 1994 (aged 18)		(Haiti) Valencia FC
10	MF	Amicy E. Frandelin	August 20, 1993 (aged 19)		(Haiti) Don Bosco FC
8	MF	Evens Saint Jean	June 26, 1994 (aged 18)		(United States) New York Red Bulls Academy
11	MF	Alfred Sonthonax	September 12, 1994 (aged 18)		(Haiti) Victory SC
18	MF	Cardjy E. Saturné Jr.	December 24, 1994 (aged 18)		(Haiti) Baltimore SC
14	MF	Luckner Horat Jr	September 27, 1994 (aged 18)		(Haiti) Aigle Noir AC
15	MF	Wilberne Augusmat	December 8, 1994 (aged 18)		(Haiti) Violette AC
19	MF	Spencer Désir	December 20, 1993 (aged 19)		(Haiti) Cavaly AS
6	MF	Rénald Metelus	January 6, 1993 (aged 20)		(France) Le Havre B
9	FW	Johnley Chéry	September 20, 1994 (aged 18)		(Haiti) Aigle Noir AC
7	FW	Fédé Dumy	March 28, 1994 (aged 18)		(Haiti) Don Bosco FC
13	FW	Duckens Nazon	April 7, 1994 (aged 18)		(France) Lorient B
20	FW	Jhon Estama	June 14, 1994 (aged 18)		(United States) New York Red Bulls Academy

== Group B ==
=== Canada ===
Coach: (Canada) Nick Dasovic

No.	Pos.	Player	Date of birth (age)	Caps	Club
1	GK	Ricky Gomes	July 19, 1993 (aged 19)	0	(Portugal) Mirandela
2	DF	Jon Dollery	July 9, 1993 (aged 19)	0	(England) Crawley Town
3	DF	Marco Lapenna	January 11, 1994 (aged 19)	4	(Germany) FC Erzgebirge Aue
4	DF	Doneil Henry	April 20, 1993 (aged 19)	6	(Canada) Toronto FC
5	DF	Daniel Stanese	January 21, 1994 (aged 19)	7	(Germany) 1. FC Nürnberg II
6	MF	Samuel Piette	November 12, 1994 (aged 18)	10	(Germany) Fortuna Düsseldorf
7	MF	Ben Fisk	February 4, 1993 (aged 20)	0	(Canada) Vancouver Whitecaps FC U-23
8	MF	Zakaria Messoudi	October 1, 1993 (aged 19)	0	(Canada) Montreal Impact
9	FW	Caleb Clarke	June 23, 1993 (age 33)	0	(Canada) Vancouver Whitecaps FC
10	MF	Keven Alemán	March 25, 1994 (aged 18)	0	(Spain) Real Valladolid
11	MF	Michael Petrasso	September 7, 1995 (aged 17)	0	(England) Queens Park Rangers
12	MF	Dylan Carreiro	January 20, 1995 (aged 18)	0	(England) Queens Park Rangers
13	MF	Alessandro Riggi	November 30, 1993 (aged 19)	0	(Spain) Celta de Vigo
15	DF	Manjrekar James	August 5, 1993 (aged 19)	0	(Hungary) Pécsi II
16	MF	Mauro Eustáquio	February 18, 1993 (aged 20)	0	(Portugal) Sporting Pombal
17	FW	Anthony Jackson-Hamel	August 3, 1993 (aged 19)	0	(Canada) Montreal Impact
18	GK	Maxime Crépeau	May 11, 1994 (aged 18)	6	(Canada) Montreal Impact
21	MF	Ben McKendry	March 25, 1993 (aged 19)	0	(United States) University of New Mexico
22	FW	Stefan Vukovic	March 18, 1993 (aged 19)	0	(Poland) Śląsk Wrocław
23	DF	Allan Zebie	May 29, 1993 (aged 19)	0	(Canada) FC Edmonton

=== Cuba ===
Coach: (Cuba) Raúl González Triana

No.	Pos.	Player	Date of birth (age)	Caps	Club
1	GK	Sandy Sanchez	May 24, 1994 (aged 18)		(Cuba)
12	GK	Delvis Lumpuy	February 21, 1994 (aged 18)		(Cuba)
3	DF	Emmanuel Labrada	January 19, 1994 (aged 19)		(Cuba)
15	DF	Adrián Diz	March 4, 1994 (aged 18)		(Cuba)
4	DF	Yolexis Collado	February 21, 1994 (aged 18)		(Cuba)
6	DF	Yosel Piedra	March 27, 1994 (aged 18)		(Cuba)
5	DF	Brian Rosales	March 7, 1995 (aged 17)		(Cuba)
18	DF	Abel Martínez	June 3, 1993 (aged 19)		(Cuba)
2	MF	Andy Vaquero	March 17, 1994 (aged 18)		(Cuba)
16	MF	Daniel Luis	May 11, 1994 (aged 18)		(Cuba)
13	MF	Lazaro Mezquia	January 3, 1994 (aged 19)		(Cuba)
17	MF	Pedro Anderson	November 9, 1993 (aged 19)		(Cuba)
10	MF	Héctor Morales	January 19, 1993 (aged 20)		(Cuba)
19	FW	David Urgelles	April 24, 1995 (aged 17)		(Cuba)
11	FW	Dairon Perez	January 7, 1994 (aged 19)		(Cuba)
14	FW	Arichel Hernández	September 20, 1993 (aged 19)		(Cuba)
7	FW	Randy Valier	September 12, 1993 (aged 19)		(Cuba)
8	FW	Jordan Santa Cruz	October 7, 1993 (aged 19)		(Cuba)
20	FW	Ricardo Suarez	January 22, 1994 (aged 19)		(Cuba)
9	FW	Maykel Reyes	March 4, 1993 (aged 19)		(Cuba)

=== Nicaragua ===
Coach: (Spain) Enrique Llena León

No.	Pos.	Player	Date of birth (age)	Caps	Goals	Club
12	GK	Yosimar Narváez	26 March 1995 (aged 17)	0	0	(Nicaraguan Football Federation)
1	GK	Pablo Cuadra	1 March 1994 (aged 18)	0	0	(Nicaraguan Football Federation)
4	DF	Nasser Valverde	4 January 1993 (aged 20)	0	0	(Nicaraguan Football Federation)
3	DF	Cristian Gutierrez Peralta	6 January 1993 (aged 20)	0	0	(Nicaraguan Football Federation)
2	DF	Cristian Gutierrez Bonilla	23 June 1993 (aged 19)	0	0	(Nicaraguan Football Federation)
6	DF	Alejandro Tapia	28 March 1993 (aged 19)	0	0	(Nicaraguan Football Federation)
7	MF	Alexis Somarriba Vargas	11 May 1994 (aged 18)	0	0	(Nicaraguan Football Federation)
16	MF	Cristhian Ramirez Lara	8 January 1993 (aged 20)	0	0	(Nicaraguan Football Federation)
11	MF	Guillermo Padilla Cross	24 November 1993 (aged 19)	0	0	(Nicaraguan Football Federation)
5	MF	Reynaldo Cruz Coca	27 May 1994 (aged 18)	0	0	(Nicaraguan Football Federation)
18	MF	Fausto Falcon Torrez	11 November 1994 (aged 18)	0	0	(Nicaraguan Football Federation)
14	MF	Jason Coronel Martinez	6 October 1993 (aged 19)	0	0	(Nicaraguan Football Federation)
17	MF	Bismarck Velis Gomez	10 September 1993 (aged 19)	0	0	(Nicaraguan Football Federation)
10	FW	Carlos Chavarria Rodriguez	2 May 1994 (aged 18)	0	0	(Nicaraguan Football Federation) Real Estelí F.C.
8	FW	Nahum Peralta Arce	21 October 1994 (aged 18)	0	0	(Nicaraguan Football Federation)
9	FW	Eulises Pavón	6 January 1993 (aged 20)	0	0	(Nicaraguan Football Federation)
13	FW	Brian Garcia	21 August 1995 (aged 17)	0	0	(Nicaraguan Football Federation)
15	FW	Hermes Navarrete	23 January 1995 (aged 18)	0	0	(Nicaraguan Football Federation)

== Group C ==
=== Jamaica ===
Coach: (Brazil) Luciano Gama

No.	Pos.	Player	Date of birth (age)	Caps	Goals	Club
13	GK	Nico Campbell	February 22, 1994 (aged 18)	1	0	(Jamaica Football Federation) Cavalier FC
1	GK	Rashaun Patterson	September 12, 1993 (aged 19)			(Jamaica Football Federation) Portmore United
5	DF	Alvas Powell	July 18, 1994 (aged 18)	3	0	(Jamaica Football Federation) Portmore United
18	DF	Zhelano Barnes	April 29, 1994 (aged 18)	1	0	(Jamaica Football Federation) Cavalier FC
4	DF	Javaun Waugh	November 16, 1995 (aged 17)			(Jamaica Football Federation) Clarendon College
6	DF	Kereen Manning	November 6, 1993 (aged 19)			(Jamaica Football Federation) Portmore United
20	DF	Shawn Lawes	July 3, 1993 (aged 19)			(Jamaica Football Federation) Arnett Gardens FC
17	DF	Damion Lowe	May 5, 1993 (aged 19)			(United States Soccer Federation) University of Hartford
16	DF	Sean McFarlane	4 April 1993 (aged 19)	2	0	(United States Soccer Federation) St. Leo University
3	MF	Rickardo Oldham	August 16, 1993 (aged 19)			(Jamaica Football Federation) Arnett Gardens FC
8	MF	Romario Jones	August 15, 1994 (aged 18)	0	0	(Jamaica Football Federation) Cavalier FC
9	MF	Omar Holness	13 March 1994 (aged 18)	3	0	Unattached
19	MF	Keniel Kirlew	February 28, 1993 (aged 19)			(Jamaica Football Federation) Montego Bay United FC
11	MF	Andre Lewis	August 12, 1994 (aged 18)	3	0	(Jamaica Football Federation) Cavalier FC
21	MF	Mark Brown	March 10, 1994 (aged 18)			(Jamaica Football Federation) Cavalier FC
12	MF	Andrew Allen	January 4, 1993 (aged 20)			(Jamaica Football Federation) Arnett Gardens FC
10	MF	Paul Wilson	16 July 1993 (aged 19)	3	0	(Jamaica Football Federation) Portmore United
15	FW	Oshana Boothe	December 7, 1994 (aged 18)			(Jamaica Football Federation) Rae Town FC
14	FW	Cleon Pryce	21 April 1994 (aged 18)			(Jamaica Football Federation) Portmore United
7	FW	Kendan Anderson	April 6, 1994 (aged 18)			(Jamaica Football Federation) Portmore United

=== Puerto Rico ===
Coach: (Costa Rica) Jeaustin Campos Madriz

No.	Pos.	Player	Date of birth (age)	Caps	Club
1	GK	Matthew Sanchez	8 April 1994 (aged 18)		(United States) Baltimore Bays Chelsea
13	GK	Karrlo Morell	7 October 1994 (aged 18)		(United States) Iona College (New York)
2	DF	Carlos Rosario	January 30, 1994 (aged 19)		(Puerto Rico) Bayamón FC
3	DF	Thomas Flecha	7 January 1993 (aged 20)		(Puerto Rico) Spadi Soccer Academy
4	DF	Emilio Cordero	7 February 1994 (aged 19)		(United States) Pittsburgh Panthers
5	DF	Thomas Vazquez	19 February 1993 (aged 19)		
16	DF	Gustavo Rivera	6 April 1993 (aged 19)		(United States) Barry University
20	DF	Alberto Montesino	21 June 1993 (aged 19)		
6	MF	Michael Fernandez	9 February 1994 (aged 19)		
7	MF	Álvaro Betancourt	8 February 1994 (aged 19)		(United States) Valparaiso Crusaders
8	MF	Emmanuel D'Andrea	20 January 1995 (aged 18)		
10	MF	Joseph Marrero	4 September 1993 (aged 19)		Puerto Rico Islanders
11	MF	Deniz Bozkurt	27 July 1993 (aged 19)		
15	MF	Carlos Ernesto Rivera	20 May 1994 (aged 18)		
17	MF	Alex Oikkonen	15 October 1994 (aged 18)		(Puerto Rico) Bayamón
18	MF	David Cabán	30 March 1993 (aged 19)		
19	MF	Juan Antonio Agustin Coca	31 May 1993 (aged 19)		
9	FW	Reid Strain	19 January 1994 (aged 19)		
12	FW	Jose Abrams	4 July 1993 (aged 19)		
14	FW	Luis Betancur	30 March 1995 (aged 17)		

=== Panama ===
Coach: (Costa Rica) Javier Wanchope Watson

No.	Pos.	Player	Date of birth (age)	Caps	Goals	Club
1	GK	Ivan Picart	2 August 1994 (aged 18)			(Panamanian Football Federation) Río Abajo F.C.
12	GK	Humberto Peláez	23 February 1993 (aged 19)			(Panamanian Football Federation) Sporting San Miguelito
2	DF	Josué Flores	21 March 1993 (aged 19)			(Panamanian Football Federation) Chorrillo F.C.
3	DF	Oscar Linton	29 January 1993 (aged 20)			(Panamanian Football Federation) Chepo F.C.
4	DF	Yitzhak Moreno	9 June 1993 (aged 19)			(Panamanian Football Federation) San Francisco F.C.
5	DF	Roberto Chen	24 May 1994 (aged 18)			(Panamanian Football Federation) San Francisco F.C.
7	DF	Jairo Jiménez	7 January 1993 (aged 20)			(Panamanian Football Federation) Chorrillo F.C.
13	DF	Jordy Mélendez	24 September 1994 (aged 18)			(Panamanian Football Federation) Chepo F.C.
15	DF	Francisco Narbon	11 February 1995 (aged 18)			(United States Soccer Federation) Shattuck-Saint Mary's
18	DF	Richard Peralta	20 September 1993 (aged 19)			(Panamanian Football Federation) Alianza F.C.
19	DF	Jose Jules	10 June 1993 (aged 19)			(Panamanian Football Federation)
6	MF	Pedro Jeanine	4 September 1993 (aged 19)			(Panamanian Football Federation) San Francisco F.C.
10	MF	Jose Munoz	15 January 1993 (aged 20)			(Panamanian Football Federation) San Francisco F.C.
11	MF	Julio Segundo	21 September 1993 (aged 19)			(Latvian Football Federation) Skonto FC
16	MF	Alcides De los Ríos	6 June 1993 (aged 19)			(Panamanian Football Federation) Tauro
17	MF	Romario Piggott	17 July 1995 (aged 17)			(Panamanian Football Federation) Chepo F.C.
20	MF	Alexander Gonzalez	14 December 1994 (aged 18)			(Panamanian Football Federation) Río Abajo F.C.
9	FW	Abdiel Arroyo	13 December 1993 (aged 19)			(Panamanian Football Federation) Árabe Unido
14	FW	Amet Ramirez	19 June 1993 (aged 19)			(Panamanian Football Federation) Plaza Amador

== Group D ==
=== Curaçao ===
Coach: (Netherlands) Hendrik Jan Schrijver

No.	Pos.	Player	Date of birth (age)	Caps	Goals	Club
1	GK	Zeus de la Paz	11 March 1995 (aged 17)			(Royal Dutch Football Association) PSV Eindhoven
22	GK	Jhudamier Marchena	28 November 1996 (aged 16)			(Curaçao Football Federation)
3	DF	Nathan Martina	29 September 1993 (aged 19)			(Curaçao Football Federation)
4	DF	Rachid Habat	8 June 1994 (aged 18)			(Curaçao Football Federation)
6	DF	Vidarrel Merencia	4 March 1994 (aged 18)			(Royal Dutch Football Association) ADO Den Haag
13	DF	Shuremy Felomina	4 March 1995 (aged 17)			(Curaçao Football Federation)
16	DF	Ronald Roosberg	13 June 1993 (aged 19)			(Royal Dutch Football Association) Haaglandia
2	MF	Michael Fecunda	4 August 1995 (aged 17)			(Curaçao Football Federation)
5	MF	Ruchendro Kierindongo	3 June 1993 (aged 19)			(Curaçao Football Federation)
7	MF	Cristopher Isenia	29 October 1993 (aged 19)			(Curaçao Football Federation)
8	MF	Richenel Lourens	29 January 1995 (aged 18)			(Curaçao Football Federation)
9	MF	Derwin Martina	19 July 1994 (aged 18)			(Royal Dutch Football Association) AFC Ajax
10	MF	Michaël Maria	31 January 1995 (aged 18)			(Royal Dutch Football Association) PSV Eindhoven
18	MF	Yaël Eisden	11 January 1994 (aged 19)			(Curaçao Football Federation)
11	FW	Liandro Martis	13 November 1995 (aged 17)			(Curaçao Football Federation)
12	FW	Denzel Slager	2 February 1993 (aged 20)			(Royal Dutch Football Association) RKC Waalwijk
14	FW	Randel Winklaar	15 July 1994 (aged 18)			(Curaçao Football Federation)
15	FW	Irvin van Eijma	9 February 1994 (aged 19)			(Curaçao Football Federation)
17	FW	Rowendy Schoop	31 May 1993 (aged 19)			(Royal Dutch Football Association) AFC Ajax
20	FW	Rigino Cicilia	23 September 1994 (aged 18)			(Royal Dutch Football Association) Roda JC

=== Mexico ===
Coach: (Mexico) Sergio Almaguer

No.	Pos.	Player	Date of birth (age)	Caps	Goals	Club
1	GK	Richard Sánchez	5 May 1994 (aged 18)			(United States Soccer Federation) Dallas
2	DF	Francisco Flores	17 January 1994 (aged 19)			(Mexican Football Federation) Cruz Azul
3	DF	Hedgardo Marín	21 February 1993 (aged 19)			(Mexican Football Federation) Guadalajara
4	DF	Antonio Briseño	5 February 1994 (aged 19)			(Mexican Football Federation) Atlas
5	DF	Bernardo Hernández	10 June 1993 (aged 19)			(Mexican Football Federation) Monterrey
6	MF	Armando Zamorano	3 October 1993 (aged 19)			(Mexican Football Federation) Chiapas
7	MF	Jonathan Espericueta	9 August 1994 (aged 18)			(Mexican Football Federation) UANL
8	MF	Julio Gómez	13 August 1994 (aged 18)			(Mexican Football Federation) Pachuca
9	FW	Marco Bueno	31 March 1994 (aged 18)			(Mexican Football Federation) CF Pachuca
10	MF	Jesús Manuel Corona	6 January 1993 (aged 20)			(Mexican Football Federation) Monterrey
11	MF	Giovanni Hernández	7 April 1993 (aged 19)			(Mexican Football Federation) CD Guadalajara
12	GK	Gibran Lajud	25 December 1993 (aged 19)			(Mexican Football Federation) Cruz Azul
13	DF	José Abella	10 February 1994 (aged 19)			(Mexican Football Federation) Santos Laguna
14	DF	Abel Fuentes	16 November 1993 (aged 19)			(Mexican Football Federation) Tigres UANL
15	MF	Josecarlos Van Rankin	14 May 1993 (aged 19)			(Mexican Football Federation) Pumas UNAM
16	MF	Carlos Treviño	19 April 1993 (aged 19)			(Mexican Football Federation) Atlas
17	FW	Carlos Fierro	24 July 1994 (aged 18)			(Mexican Football Federation) CD Guadalajara
18	MF	Uvaldo Luna	21 December 1993 (aged 19)			(Mexican Football Federation) Tigres UANL
19	FW	Luis Madrigal	10 February 1993 (aged 20)			(Mexican Football Federation) CF Monterrey
20	MF	Alonso Escoboza	22 January 1993 (aged 20)			(Mexican Football Federation) Necaxa

=== El Salvador ===
Coach: (El Salvador) Mauricio Alfaro

No.	Pos.	Player	Date of birth (age)	Caps	Goals	Club
1	GK	Rolando Morales	3 January 1994 (aged 19)			(Salvadoran Football Federation) FESA
18	GK	Wilberth Hernández	5 April 1994 (aged 18)			(Salvadoran Football Federation)
17	DF	Kevin Ayala	1 October 1994 (aged 18)			(Salvadoran Football Federation) FESA
6	DF	Marvin Baumgartner	19 January 1993 (aged 20)			(Swiss Football Association) FC Zürich U-21
4	DF	Giovanni Zavaleta	27 September 1994 (aged 18)			(United States Soccer Federation) Rush Soccer
2	DF	Oliver Ayala	4 January 1994 (aged 19)			(Mexican Football Federation) León U-20
3	DF	Bryan Bonilla	21 December 1992 (aged 20)			(United States Soccer Federation) Rush Soccer
13	DF	Miguel Lemus	26 October 1993 (aged 19)			(Salvadoran Football Federation) FESA
5	DF	Alex Mejía	1 November 1994 (aged 18)			(Salvadoran Football Federation) FESA
15	MF	René Gómez	8 January 1993 (aged 20)			(Salvadoran Football Federation) FESA
16	MF	Melvin Alfaro	6 May 1993 (aged 19)			(Salvadoran Football Federation) FESA
12	MF	Kevin Barahona	1 October 1994 (aged 18)			(United States Soccer Federation) Rush Soccer
10	MF	Diego Coca	26 August 1994 (aged 18)			(United States Soccer Federation) Rush Soccer
8	MF	José Villavicencio	24 January 1995 (aged 18)			(Salvadoran Football Federation) FESA
19	MF	Anthony Dheming	7 October 1993 (aged 19)			(United States Soccer Federation) Chivas USA Academy
11	MF	Alexander Suazo	5 January 1994 (aged 19)			(Salvadoran Football Federation) UES
9	FW	José Peña	10 December 1994 (aged 18)			(Salvadoran Football Federation) FESA
20	FW	Roberto González	25 March 1993 (aged 19)			(Salvadoran Football Federation) Santa Tecla
14	FW	Rommel Mejía	4 February 1994 (aged 19)			(Salvadoran Football Federation) Dragón
7	FW	Jairo Henríquez	31 August 1993 (aged 19)			(Salvadoran Football Federation) FESA
