= 2013 in American soccer =

Soccer in the United States
- Season: 2013

Men's soccer
- Supporters' Shield: New York Red Bulls
- NASL: New York Cosmos
- USL Pro: Orlando City
- NPSL: RVA Football Club
- PDL: Austin Aztex
- US Open Cup: D.C. United
- MLS Cup: Sporting Kansas City

Women's soccer
- NWSL: Portland Thorns FC

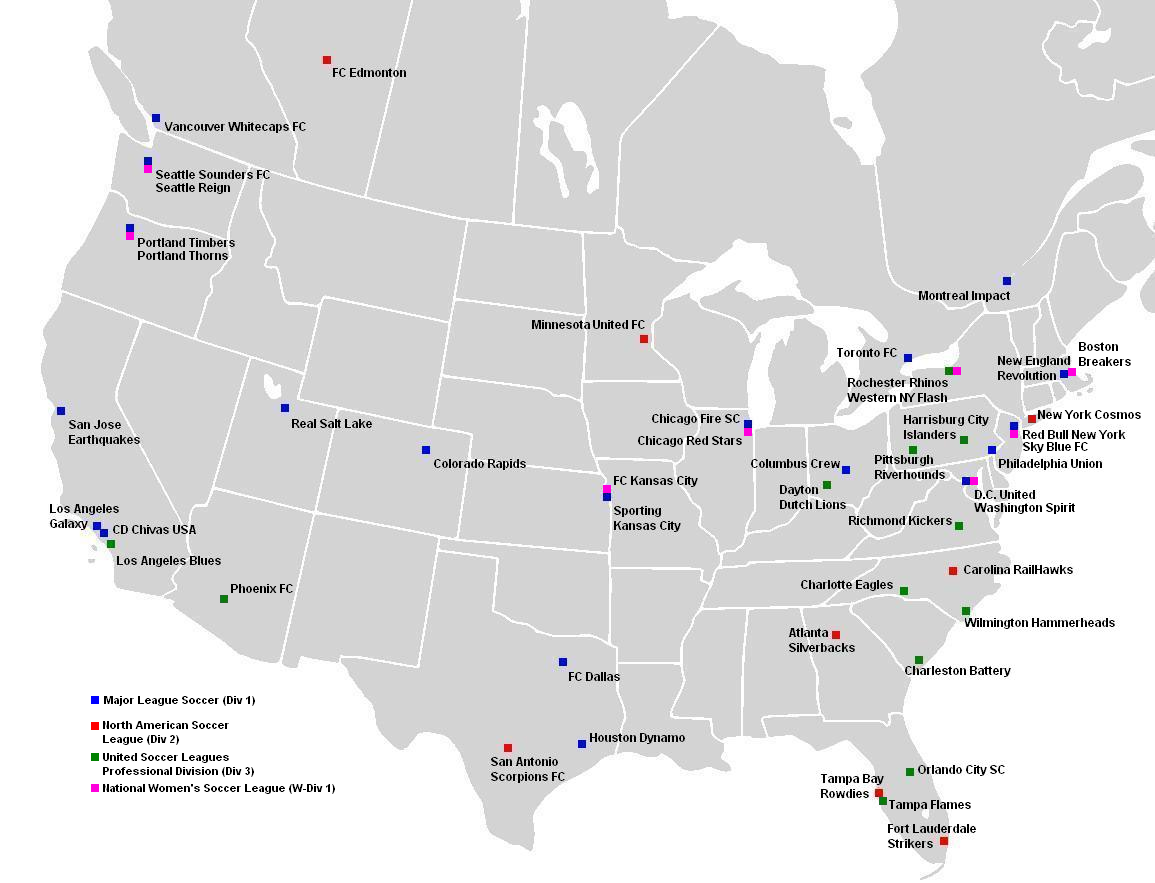
The professional soccer clubs of the United States and Canada for 2013.

The 2013 season was the 101st edition of competitive soccer in the United States.

== National teams ==
=== Men ===
==== Senior ====
| Wins | Losses | Draws |
|---|---|---|
| 16 | 4 | 3 |

| January 29 Friendly | United States | 0–0 | Canada | Houston, Texas |
| 20:00 UTC−06 | | Report | Morgan (yellow card) 78'; Ledgerwood (yellow card) 79' | Stadium: BBVA Compass Stadium; Attendance: 11,737; Referee: Raúl Castro (HON) |

| February 6 WCQ R4 | Honduras | 2–1 | United States | San Pedro Sula, Honduras |
| 15:00 UTC−06 | García 40'; Bengtson 79' | Report | Dempsey 36' | Stadium: Estadio Olímpico Metropolitano; Attendance: 37,000; Referee: Wálter Quesada (CRC) |

| March 22 WCQ R4 | United States | 1–0 | Costa Rica | Commerce City, Colorado |
| 22:00 EST | Dempsey 16' | Report | Miller (yellow card) 49'; Gonzalez (yellow card) 90' | Stadium: Dick's Sporting Goods Park; Attendance: 19,374; Referee: Joel Aguilar (SLV) |

| March 26 WCQ R4 | Mexico | 0–0 | United States | Mexico City, Mexico |
| 22:30 EST | | Report | Beasley (yellow card) 8'; Besler (yellow card) 20'; Davis (yellow card) 90+2' | Stadium: Estadio Azteca; Attendance: 100,000; Referee: Walter Castellanos (GUA) |

| May 29 Friendly | United States | 2–4 | Belgium | Cleveland, Ohio |
| 20:00 UTC−06 | Cameron 22'; Dempsey 80' (pen.); Jones (yellow card) 90' | Report | Mirallas 6'; Benteke 56', 71'; Fellaini 64'; Simons (yellow card) 78' | Stadium: FirstEnergy Stadium; Attendance: 27,720; Referee: Jeffery Solis (CRC) |

| June 2 Friendly | United States | 4–3 | Germany | Washington, D.C. |
| 14:30 EDT | Altidore 13' ter Stegen 16' (o.g.); Dempsey 60', 64' | Report | Westermann 51'; Kruse 79'; Draxler 81' | Stadium: RFK Stadium; Attendance: 47,359; Referee: Paul Delgadillo (MEX) |

| June 7 WCQ R4 | Jamaica | 1–2 | United States | Kingston, Jamaica |
| 21:30 EDT | Beckford 89' | Report | Altidore 30'; Evans 90+2' (yellow card) 90+2'; Zusi (yellow card) 88' | Stadium: Independence Park; Attendance: 12,130; Referee: Roberto Moreno (PAN) |

| June 11 WCQ R4 | United States | 2–0 | Panama | Seattle |
| 18:30 PDT | Altidore 36' (yellow card) 56'; Johnson 53'; Cameron (yellow card) 69'; Beasley (yellow card) 90+2'; Howard (yellow card) 90+3' | Report | Sánchez (yellow card) 69' | Stadium: CenturyLink Field; Attendance: 40,847; Referee: Roberto García Orozco (MEX) |

| June 18 WCQ R4 | United States | 1–0 | Honduras | Sandy, Utah |
| 19:00 MDT | Jones (yellow card) 10'; Altidore 73' | Report | Peralta (yellow card) 34'; Palacios (yellow card) 75'; Velásquez (yellow card) 81' | Stadium: Rio Tinto Stadium; Attendance: 20,250; Referee: Enrico Wijngaarde (SUR) |

| July 5 Friendly | United States | 6–0 | Guatemala | San Diego, California |
| 20:00 PDT | Gómez 42'; Donovan 55' (pen.), 72'; Wondolowski 71'; Goodson 84'; Bedoya 88' | Report | | Stadium: Qualcomm Stadium; Attendance: 25,080; Referee: Valdin Legister (JAM) |

| July 9 GC Group C | Belize | 1–6 | United States | Portland, Oregon |
| 20:00 PDT | Gaynair 42'; Lennen (yellow card) 46' | Report | Wondolowski 12', 39', 43'; Holden 58'; Orozco 73'; Donovan 77' (pen.) | Stadium: Jeld-Wen Field; Attendance: 18,724; Referee: Hector Rodriguez (HON) |

| July 13 GC Group C | United States | 4–1 | Cuba | Sandy, Utah |
| 13:30 MDT | Donovan 45+2' (pen.); Corona 57'; Wondolowski 66', 85' | Report | Alfonso 36'; Márquez (yellow card) 45+2'; Colomé (yellow card) 75' | Stadium: Rio Tinto Stadium; Attendance: 17,597; Referee: David Gantar (CAN) |

| July 16 GC Group C | United States | 1–0 | Costa Rica | East Hartford, Connecticut |
| 20:00 EDT | Holden (yellow card) 60'; Shea 82'; Parkhurst (yellow card) 90+2' | Report | Pemberton (yellow card) 55'; Cunningham (yellow card) 56'; Arrieta (yellow card) 76' | Stadium: Rentschler Field; Attendance: 25,432; Referee: Courtney Campbell (JAM) |

| July 21 GC Quarterfinals | United States | 5–1 | El Salvador | Baltimore, Maryland |
| 16:00 EDT | Goodson (yellow card) 15' (goal) 21'; Corona 29'; Johnson 60'; Donovan 78'; Diskerud 84' | Report | Zelaya 39' (pen.); Cerén (yellow card) 68' | Stadium: M&T Bank Stadium; Attendance: 70,540; Referee: Enrico Wijngaarde (SUR) |

| July 24 GC Semi-finals | United States | 3–1 | Honduras | Arlington, Texas |
| 19:00 EDT | Johnson 11' (yellow card) 90+2'; Donovan 27', 53' | Report | Medina 52' | Stadium: Cowboys Stadium; Attendance: 81,410; Referee: Wálter Quesada (CRC) |

| July 28 GC Final | United States | 1–0 | Panama | Chicago |
| 16:00 EDT | Bedoya (yellow card) 63'; Shea 69' (yellow card) 90+4'; Johnson (yellow card) 90' | Report | Parris (yellow card) 90+1'; Jiménez (yellow card) 90+4' | Stadium: Soldier Field; Attendance: 57,920; Referee: Joel Aguilar (SLV) |

| August 14 Friendly | Bosnia and Herzegovina | 3–4 | United States | Sarajevo, Bosnia and Herzegovina |
| 14:30 EDT | Džeko 8', 90'; Ibišević 30'; Spahić (yellow card) 27' | Report | Johnson 55'; Altidore 59', 84', 86' | Stadium: Asim Ferhatovic Hase Stadium; Attendance: 24,000; Referee: Damir Skomina (SVN) |

| September 6 WCQ R4 | Costa Rica | 3–1 | United States | San José, Costa Rica |
| 20:00 EDT | Acosta 2'; Borges 9'; Campbell 75'; Umaña (yellow card) 32'; Bolaños (yellow card) 36'; Navas (yellow card) 41' | Report | Dempsey 43' (pen.); Cameron (yellow card) 62'; Besler (yellow card) 78'; Altidore (yellow card) 90+3' | Stadium: Estadio Ricardo Saprissa; Attendance: 35,000; Referee: Marco Antonio Rodríguez (MEX) |

| September 10 WCQ R4 | United States | 2–0 | Mexico | Columbus, Ohio, USA |
| 20:00 EDT | Johnson 49'; Donovan 78' (yellow card) 85'; Bedoya (yellow card) 45+1' | Report | | Stadium: Columbus Crew Stadium; Attendance: 24,584; Referee: Courtney Campbell (JAM) |

| October 11 WCQ R4 | United States | 2–0 | Jamaica | Kansas City, Kansas, USA |
| 17:36 UTC−5 | Zusi 77'; Altidore 81'; Kljestan (yellow card) 90+1' | Report | Anderson (yellow card) 90+2' | Stadium: Sporting Park; Attendance: 18,467; Referee: Elmer Bonilla (SLV) |

| October 15 WCQ R4 | Panama | 2–3 | United States | Panama City, Panama |
| 20:30 UTC−5 | G. Torres 18'; Tejada 84' (yellow card) 85' (red card) 90+2'; R. Torres (yellow card) 86' | Report | Orozco 64'; Zusi 90+2'; Jóhannsson 90+3' | Stadium: Estadio Rommel Fernández; Referee: Courtney Campbell (JAM) |

| November 15 Friendly | Scotland | 0–0 | United States | Glasgow, Scotland |
| 15:00 EST | | Report | | Stadium: Hampden Park; Attendance: 21,079; Referee: Michael Oliver (ENG) |

| November 19 Friendly | Austria | 1–0 | United States | Vienna, Austria |
| 14:45 EST | Janko 33' | Report | | Stadium: Ernst-Happel-Stadion; Attendance: 20,200; Referee: Istan Vad (HUN) |

===== Goal scorers =====
| Player | Goals |
|---|---|
| Jozy Altidore | 8 |
| Landon Donovan | 8 |
| Clint Dempsey | 6 |
| Chris Wondolowski | 6 |
| Eddie Johnson | 5 |
| Joe Corona | 2 |
| Clarence Goodson | 2 |
| Michael Orozco Fiscal | 2 |
| Brek Shea | 2 |
| Graham Zusi | 2 |
| Alejandro Bedoya | 1 |
| Geoff Cameron | 1 |
| Brad Evans | 1 |
| Mix Diskerud | 1 |
| Herculez Gomez | 1 |
| Stuart Holden | 1 |
| Aron Jóhannsson | 1 |
| Own Goals | 1 |

==== Under-20 ====
| January 19 Friendly | United States | 2–2 | Panama | Puebla, Mexico |
| 16:00 UTC−06 | Cuevas 52'; Allen 55' | Report | 3'; 78' | Stadium: Estadio Olympico |

| January 21 Friendly | United States | 1–2 | Panama | Puebla, Mexico |
| 15:00 UTC−06 | Villarreal 66' (pen.) | Report | 63'; 79' |

| February 18 CONCACAF Champ. Group A | Haiti | 1–2 | United States | Puebla, Mexico |
| 17:30 UTC−06 | Jean-Dany 49' | Report | Gil 3'; Cuevas 26' | Stadium: Estadio Olímpico de C.U. |

| February 22 CONCACAF Champ. Group A | United States | 1–0 | Costa Rica | Puebla, Mexico |
| 17:30 UTC−06 | Villarreal 63' | Report | | Stadium: Estadio Olímpico de C.U. |

| February 26 CONCACAF Champ. Quarters | United States | 4–2 | Canada | Puebla, Mexico |
| 17:00 UTC−06 | Gil 29'; Villarreal 40', 54'; Trapp 45+1' | Report | Carreiro 23'; Piette 64' | Stadium: Estadio Olímpico de C.U. |

| March 1 CONCACAF Champ. Semis | United States | 2–0 | Cuba | Puebla, Mexico |
| 17:00 UTC−06 | Rodriguez 7'; Cuevas 10' | Report | | Stadium: Estadio Olímpico de C.U. |

| March 3 CONCACAF Champ. Final | United States | 1–3 (a.e.t.) | Mexico | Puebla, Mexico |
| 18:00 UTC−06 | Joya 10' (pen.) | Report | Corona 4'; Gomez 99'; Espericueta 113' (pen.) | Stadium: Estadio Cuauhtemoc; Referee: Enrico Wijgaarden (SUR) |

| June 21 U20 WC Group A | United States | 1–4 | Spain | Istanbul, Turkey |
| 21:00 UTC−06 | Villarreal (yellow card) 64'; Joya (yellow card) 76'; Gil 77'; Juan Pablo Ocegueda (yellow card) 87'; Lopez (yellow card) 90+2' | Summary | Jesé Rodríguez 5', 44'; Javier Manquillo (yellow card) 21'; Gerard Deulofeu 42', 61'; Israel Puerto (yellow card) 52' | Stadium: Ali Sami Yen Arena; Attendance: 4,133; Referee: (The Gambia) Bakary Gassama |

| June 24 U20 WC Group A | France | 1–1 | United States | Istanbul, Turkey |
| 18:00 UTC−06 | | | | Stadium: Ali Sami Yen Arena; Attendance: 4,120 |

| June 27 U20 WC Group A | Ghana | 4–1 | United States | Kayseri, Turkey |
| 21:00 UTC−06 | | | | Stadium: Kadir Has Stadium; Attendance: 4,873 |

==== Under-18 ====
| March 19 Friendly | United States | 0–4 | France | Clairefontaine-en-Yvelines, France |
| | | | | Stadium: Clairefontaine |

| March 22 Friendly | Romania | 1–1 | United States | Bucharest, Romania |
| | | | Spencer |

| March 24 Friendly | Romania | 2–0 | United States | Bucharest, Romania |

| May 21 Lisbon Intl Tournament | Czech Republic | 0–3 | United States | Malveira, Portugal |
| 16:00 UTC+01 | | | Gall 17'; Rubin 35'; Gall 48' | Stadium: Estádio das Seixas |

| May 23 Lisbon Intl Tournament | Portugal | 1–1 | United States | Mafra, Portugal |
| 18:00 UTC+01 | Rodrigues 51' | | Gall 48' | Stadium: Parque Desportivo Eng. Ministro dos Santos |

| May 25 Lisbon Intl Tournament | United States | 1–2 | Hungary | Mafra, Portugal |
| 16:00 UTC+01 | Arriola 43' | | | Stadium: Parque Desportivo Eng. Ministro dos Santos |

| July 29 2013 Milk Cup | United States | 1–1 | Mexico | Ballymoney, Northern Ireland |
| 20:00 UTC+01 | Moreno 5'; Amick (yellow card) 15' | Report | Arreola (yellow card) 34'; S. Rodriguez (yellow card) 45'; S. A. Rodriguez (yellow card) 48'; Flores 71' | Stadium: Riada Stadium |

| July 31 2013 Milk Cup | United States | 1–3 | Northern Ireland | Drumahoe, Northern Ireland |
| 20:00 UTC+01 | Muyl 24'; Requejo Jr. (yellow card) 56'; Miazga (yellow card) 88' | Report | Ball (yellow card) 20'; McElroy 45+1' 86'; McCullough 46'; Morgan (yellow card) 80' | Stadium: Riverside Stadium |

| August 2 2013 Milk Cup | Denmark | 1–1 | United States | Limavady, Northern Ireland |
| 13:30 UTC+01 | Bruhn 55' | | Rubin 74' | Stadium: The Showgrounds |

==== Under-17 ====
| February 23 Friendly | United States | 0–4 | Mexico | Panama City, Panama |
| 15:00 EST | | Report | Zúniga 33'; Almanza (yellow card) 39'; Granados 51', 60'; Díaz 83' | Stadium: Estadio Rommel Fernández |

| February 26 Friendly | United States | 1–1 | Panama | Panama City, Panama |
| | Flores 5' | Report | 50' | Stadium: Estadio Rommel Fernández |

| April 1 Friendly | United States | 8–0 | Barbados | Bradenton, Florida, USA |
| | Selemani 2'; Baird 22'; Martin 27'; Akale 47', 57', 89'; Glad 65'; Elney 68' | Report | | Stadium: IMG Academy |

| April 7 CONCACAF U17 Championship Group C | Haiti | 0–3 | United States | Panama City, Panama |
| 18:30 EST | | Report | Lema 25' (pen.), 73'; Selemani 84' | Stadium: Estadio Rommel Fernández |

| April 11 CONCACAF U17 Championship Group C | United States | 1–0 | Guatemala | Panama City, Panama |
| 18:30 EST | Baird 49' | Report | | Stadium: Estadio Rommel Fernández; Attendance: 220; Referee: William Anderson (Puerto Rico) |

| April 14 CONCACAF U17 Championship Quarters | United States | 1–3 | Honduras | Panama City, Panama |
| 17:00 EST | Soñora 45' | Report | Alegría 42'; Elis 57'; Alvarez 68' | Stadium: Estadio Rommel Fernández; Referee: Henry Bejarano (CRC) |

| May 30 Caspian Cup Group A | United States | 11–0 | Kyrgyzstan | Baku, Azerbaijan |
| 08:00 EST | Lennon 1', 21', 32'; Saucedo 8', 22', 29'; Villegas 11', 46'; Schropp 51'; Vergara 61'; Akale 69' | Report | | Stadium: Dalga Arena |

| June 1 Caspian Cup Group A | Azerbaijan | 2–1 | United States | Baku, Azerbaijan |
| 11:00 EST | | | | Stadium: Bayil Stadium |

| June 2 Caspian Cup Group A | United States | 2–0 | Bulgaria | Baku, Azerbaijan |
| 11:00 EST | | | | Stadium: Bayil Stadium |

| June 4 2013 Caspian Cup | United States | 5–2 | Uzbekistan | Baku, Azerbaijan |
| 11:00 EST | | | | Stadium: Bayil Stadium |

| December 12 2013 Nike International Friendlies | United States | 5–1 | England | Lakewood Ranch, Florida |
| 17:00 EST | Gallardo 13', 17', 85'; Wright 72', 80'; McCabe (yellow card) 89' | Report | Edwards 48'; Arnold (yellow card) 83' | Stadium: Premier Sports Campus; Attendance: 1,200; Referee: Richonne Clark |

=== Women ===
==== Senior ====
| Wins | Losses | Draws |
|---|---|---|
| 13 | 0 | 3 |

External videos
- United States vs South Korea 20 June 2013 full match on YouTube

| February 9 Friendly | United States | 4–1 | Scotland | Jacksonville, Florida |
| 17:00 EST | Press 13', 31'; Boxx 52'; Leroux 88' | Report | Little 54' | Stadium: EverBank Field; Attendance: 18,656; Referee: Margaret Domka (USA) |

| February 13 Friendly | United States | 3–1 | Scotland | Nashville, Tennessee |
| 17:00 CST | Rapinoe 21'; Wambach 51'; Press 54' | Report | Grant 81' | Stadium: LP Field; Attendance: 14,224; Referee: Katja Koroleva (USA) |

| March 6 Algarve Cup | United States | 3–0 | Iceland | Albufeira, Portugal |
| 14:00 WET | Buehler 48'; Boxx 63'; Wambach 74' | Report | | Stadium: Estádio Municipal, Albufeira; Attendance: 500; Referee: Fusako Kajiyama (JPN) |

| March 8 Algarve Cup | China | 0–5 | United States | Albufeira, Portugal |
| 14:00 WET | | Report | Leroux 14'; Krieger 32'; Rapinoe 46'; Press 64'; Engen 84' | Stadium: Estádio Municipal, Albufeira; Attendance: 500; Referee: Jana Adamkova (CZE) |

| March 11 Algarve Cup | Sweden | 1–1 | United States | Lagos, Portugal |
| 15:00 WET | Dahlkvist 4' | Report | Morgan 56' | Stadium: Estádio Municipal, Lagos; Attendance: 750; Referee: Esther Staubli (SUI) |

| March 13 Algarve Cup | Germany | 0–2 | United States | Faro, Portugal |
| 17:00 WET | | | Morgan 13', 34' | Stadium: Estádio Algarve, Algarve |

| April 5 Friendly | Germany | 3–3 | United States | Offenbach, Germany |
| 18:15 CEST | Kulig 63'; Okoyino da Mbabi 85' (pen.); Mittag 86' | Report | Wambach 47'; Rapinoe 55'; Morgan 71' | Stadium: Sparda Bank Hessen Stadium; Attendance: 16,090; Referee: Christina Pederson |

| April 9 Friendly | Netherlands | 1–3 | United States | The Hague, Netherlands |
| 19:00 CEST | Hoogendijk (yellow card) 72'; Melis 81' | Report | Heath 36'; Press 45', 60' | Stadium: Kyocera Stadion; Referee: Christine Baitinger |

| June 2 Friendly | Canada | 0–3 | United States | Toronto, Ontario, Canada |
| 16:30 EDT | | Report | Morgan 70' 72'; Leroux 90+3' | Stadium: BMO Field; Attendance: TBD; Referee: Quetzalli Alvarado |

| June 15 Friendly | United States | 4–1 | South Korea | Foxborough, Massachusetts |
| 19:00 EDT | Mewis 3'; Cheney 7'; Lloyd 57'; Wambach 90+3' | Report | Soh-yun 26' | Stadium: Gillette Stadium; Attendance: 13,035 |

| June 20 Friendly | United States | 5–0 | South Korea | Harrison, New Jersey |
| 19:30 EDT | Wambach 10' 19' 29' 45+1'; Cheney 64' | Report | | Stadium: Red Bull Arena; Attendance: 18,961; Referee: Margaret Domka |

| September 3 Friendly | United States | 7–0 | Mexico | Washington, D.C. |
| 20:00 EDT | Wambach 11'; Leroux 21' 22' 30' 41'; Buehler 55'; Brian 72' | Report | | Stadium: RFK Stadium; Attendance: 12,594; Referee: Gillian Martindale |

| October 20 Friendly | United States | 4–0 | Australia | San Antonio |
| 12:30 CDT | Holiday 6'; Loyd 14'; Wambach 56'; Press 90+1' | Report | | Stadium: Alamodome; Attendance: 19,109; Referee: Kari Seitz (USA) |

| October 27 Friendly | United States | 4–1 | New Zealand | San Francisco |
| 15:30 PDT | Rapinoe 7'; Loyd 12'; Press 42'; O'Reilly 87' | Report | Wilkinson 54' | Stadium: Candlestick Park; Attendance: 16,315; Referee: Carol-Anne Chenard (CAN) |

| October 30 Friendly | United States | 1–1 | New Zealand | Columbus, Ohio |
| 19:30 EDT | Krieger (yellow card) 23'; Leroux 42' | Report | Percival (yellow card) 72'; Wilkinson 87' | Stadium: Columbus Crew Stadium; Attendance: 15,139; Referee: Sabina Charles-Kirton (St. Lucia) |

| November 11 Friendly | United States | 4–1 | Brazil | Orlando, Florida |
| 15:30 EST | Leroux 15' 36'; Wambach 17' (pen.); Tymrak 76'; Lloyd (yellow card) 79' (yellow-red card) 90+2' | Report | Andréia Rosa (yellow card) 5'; Rosana 25' | Stadium: Florida Citrus Bowl Stadium; Attendance: 20,274; Referee: Margaret Domka (USA) |

==== Under-23 ====
| February 28 Four Nations | United States | 3–1 | Norway | La Manga, Spain |
| | McCarty 17'; Pressley 33'; Ochs 51' | Report | Hegerberg 62' | Stadium: La Manga Stadium; Referee: Ifeoma Kulmala (FIN) |

| March 2 Four Nations | United States | 6–0 | Sweden | La Manga, Spain |
| | Marlborough 2', 24'; Johnston 20'; Bywaters 43'; Mewis 71'; Williams 80' | Report | | Stadium: La Manga Stadium; Referee: Christina Pedersen (NOR) |

| March 4 Four Nations | United States | 2–1 | England | La Manga, Spain |
| | Johnston 39'; Ochs 85' | Report | Harrop 42' | Stadium: La Manga Stadium |

==== Under-20 ====
| March 7 Twelve Nations | United States | 1–1 | Norway | La Manga, Spain |
| | Thun 89' | Report | Munerlyn 62' | Stadium: La Manga Stadium; Referee: Eliska Kramlova (CZE) |

| March 9 Twelve Nations | United States | 0–3 | Germany | La Manga, Spain |
| | | Report | Jager 5', 35'; Magull 45' (pen.) | Stadium: La Manga Stadium; Referee: Zusana Kovacoca (SVK) |

| March 11 Twelve Nations | United States | 0–0 | Sweden | La Manga, Spain |
| | | Report | | Stadium: La Manga Stadium; Referee: Eliska Kramlova (CZE) |

==== Under-17 ====
| January 29 Friendly | United States | 1–1 | Germany | Carson, California |
| 16:00 UTC−08 | Tillman 88' | Report | Jurado 55' | Stadium: Home Depot Center; Referee: Magic Berenji (USA) |

| February 1 Friendly | United States | 1–1 | Germany | Carson, California |
| 15:00 UTC−08 | Stevens 7' | Report | Ehegotz 60' | Stadium: Home Depot Center; Referee: Richard Sarfaraz (USA) |

| April 24 Friendly | United States | 3–0 | Mexico | San José, Costa Rica |
| 20:00 | Mallory Pugh 8'; Kaycie Tillman 11'; Madison Haley 80' | Report | | Stadium: National Stadium; Referee: (Costa Rica) Maria Flores |

| April 26 Friendly | United States | 4–0 | Costa Rica | San José, Costa Rica |
| 20:00 | Dorian Bailey 9'; Mallory Pugh 17'; Madison Haley 24', 26' | Report | | Stadium: National Stadium; Referee: (Costa Rica) Jeffrey Solis |

| April 28 Friendly | United States | 1–4 | Japan | San José, Costa Rica |
| 20:00 | Mallory Pugh 28' | Report | Miho Kamogawa 21'; Fuka Kono 27'; Hina Sugita 88'; Rikako Kobayashi 91' | Stadium: Rohemoser Stadium; Referee: (Costa Rica) Marianela Araya |

== American club leagues ==
=== Major League Soccer ===
The Major League Soccer season began on March 2, 2013, following preseason events in Tucson, Arizona, Orlando, Florida, and Charleston, South Carolina. The regular season ended on October 27, 2013.

==== Conference tables ====
Eastern Conference

| Pos | Team | Pld | W | L | T | GF | GA | GD | Pts | Qualification |
|---|---|---|---|---|---|---|---|---|---|---|
| 1 | New York Red Bulls | 34 | 17 | 9 | 8 | 58 | 41 | +17 | 59 | Qualification for the conference semifinals |
| 2 | Sporting Kansas City | 34 | 17 | 10 | 7 | 47 | 30 | +17 | 58 | Qualification for the conference semifinals |
| 3 | New England Revolution | 34 | 14 | 11 | 9 | 49 | 38 | +11 | 51 | Qualification for the conference semifinals |
| 4 | Houston Dynamo | 34 | 14 | 11 | 9 | 41 | 41 | 0 | 51 | Qualification for the knockout round |
| 5 | Montreal Impact | 34 | 14 | 13 | 7 | 50 | 49 | +1 | 49 | Qualification for the knockout round |
| 6 | Chicago Fire | 34 | 14 | 13 | 7 | 47 | 52 | −5 | 49 | |
| 7 | Philadelphia Union | 34 | 12 | 12 | 10 | 42 | 44 | −2 | 46 | |
| 8 | Columbus Crew | 34 | 12 | 17 | 5 | 42 | 46 | −4 | 41 | |
| 9 | Toronto FC | 34 | 6 | 17 | 11 | 30 | 47 | −17 | 29 | |
| 10 | D.C. United | 34 | 3 | 24 | 7 | 22 | 59 | −37 | 16 | |

Source: MLS

Western Conference

| Pos | Team | Pld | W | L | T | GF | GA | GD | Pts | Qualification |
|---|---|---|---|---|---|---|---|---|---|---|
| 1 | Portland Timbers | 34 | 14 | 5 | 15 | 54 | 33 | +21 | 57 | Qualification for the conference semifinals |
| 2 | Real Salt Lake | 34 | 16 | 10 | 8 | 57 | 41 | +16 | 56 | Qualification for the conference semifinals |
| 3 | LA Galaxy | 34 | 15 | 11 | 8 | 53 | 38 | +15 | 53 | Qualification for the conference semifinals |
| 4 | Seattle Sounders FC | 34 | 15 | 12 | 7 | 42 | 42 | 0 | 52 | Qualification for the knockout round |
| 5 | Colorado Rapids | 34 | 14 | 11 | 9 | 45 | 38 | +7 | 51 | Qualification for the knockout round |
| 6 | San Jose Earthquakes | 34 | 14 | 11 | 9 | 35 | 42 | −7 | 51 | |
| 7 | Vancouver Whitecaps FC | 34 | 13 | 12 | 9 | 53 | 45 | +8 | 48 | |
| 8 | FC Dallas | 34 | 11 | 12 | 11 | 48 | 52 | −4 | 44 | |
| 9 | Chivas USA | 34 | 6 | 20 | 8 | 30 | 67 | −37 | 26 | |

Source: MLS

==== Overall table ====
| Pos | Team | Pld | W | L | T | GF | GA | GD | Pts | |
|---|---|---|---|---|---|---|---|---|---|---|
| 1 | New York Red Bulls (S) | 34 | 17 | 9 | 8 | 58 | 41 | +17 | 59 | Qualification for the CONCACAF Champions League |
| 2 | Sporting Kansas City (C) | 34 | 17 | 10 | 7 | 47 | 30 | +17 | 58 | Qualification for the CONCACAF Champions League |
| 3 | Portland Timbers | 34 | 14 | 5 | 15 | 54 | 33 | +21 | 57 | Qualification for the CONCACAF Champions League |
| 4 | Real Salt Lake | 34 | 16 | 10 | 8 | 57 | 41 | +16 | 56 | |
| 5 | LA Galaxy | 34 | 15 | 11 | 8 | 53 | 38 | +15 | 53 | |
| 6 | Seattle Sounders FC | 34 | 15 | 12 | 7 | 42 | 42 | 0 | 52 | |
| 7 | New England Revolution | 34 | 14 | 11 | 9 | 49 | 38 | +11 | 51 | |
| 8 | Colorado Rapids | 34 | 14 | 11 | 9 | 45 | 38 | +7 | 51 | |
| 9 | Houston Dynamo | 34 | 14 | 11 | 9 | 41 | 41 | 0 | 51 | |
| 10 | San Jose Earthquakes | 34 | 14 | 11 | 9 | 35 | 42 | −7 | 51 | |
| 11 | Montreal Impact (V) | 34 | 14 | 13 | 7 | 50 | 49 | +1 | 49 | Qualification for the CONCACAF Champions League |
| 12 | Chicago Fire | 34 | 14 | 13 | 7 | 47 | 52 | −5 | 49 | |
| 13 | Vancouver Whitecaps FC | 34 | 13 | 12 | 9 | 53 | 45 | +8 | 48 | |
| 14 | Philadelphia Union | 34 | 12 | 12 | 10 | 42 | 44 | −2 | 46 | |
| 15 | FC Dallas | 34 | 11 | 12 | 11 | 48 | 52 | −4 | 44 | |
| 16 | Columbus Crew | 34 | 12 | 17 | 5 | 42 | 46 | −4 | 41 | |
| 17 | Toronto FC | 34 | 6 | 17 | 11 | 30 | 47 | −17 | 29 | |
| 18 | Chivas USA | 34 | 6 | 20 | 8 | 30 | 67 | −37 | 26 | |
| 19 | D.C. United (U) | 34 | 3 | 24 | 7 | 22 | 59 | −37 | 16 | Qualification for the CONCACAF Champions League |

Source: MLS
Rules for classification: 1) points; 2) head-to-head record; 3) goal difference; 4) number of goals scored
(C) MLS Cup champions; (S) Supporters' Shield winners; (U) U.S. Open Cup winners; (V) Canadian Championship winners

==== MLS Cup Playoffs ====
Knockout round
E4 | Houston Dynamo | 3
E5 | Montreal Impact | 0
W4 | Seattle Sounders FC | 2
W5 | Colorado Rapids | 0

Conference semifinals
E1 | New York Red Bulls | 2 | 1 | 3
E4 | Houston Dynamo (a.e.t.) | 2 | 2 | 4
Eastern Conference
E2 | Sporting Kansas City (a.e.t.) | 1 | 3 | 4
E3 | New England Revolution | 2 | 1 | 3
W1 | Portland Timbers | 2 | 3 | 5
W4 | Seattle Sounders FC | 1 | 2 | 3
Western Conference
W2 | Real Salt Lake (a.e.t.) | 0 | 2 | 2
W3 | Los Angeles Galaxy | 1 | 0 | 1

Conference finals
E4 | Houston Dynamo | 0 | 1 | 1
E2 | Sporting Kansas City | 0 | 2 | 2
W1 | Portland Timbers | 2 | 0 | 2
W2 | Real Salt Lake | 4 | 1 | 5

MLS Cup
E2 | Sporting Kansas City (p) | 1 (7)
W2 | Real Salt Lake | 1 (6)

=== North American Soccer League ===
The North American Soccer League has been split into spring and fall tournaments for the 2013 season, similar to the Apertura and Clausura league system commonly found in Mexican and Central American soccer leagues. The winner of the Spring season will host the winner of the Fall season in the 2013 Soccer Bowl championship. The Spring season will begin on April 6, 2013. The Fall season will begin on August 3, 2013.

==== Spring Season ====
| Pos | Team | Pld | W | D | L | GF | GA | GD | Pts | Qualification |
|---|---|---|---|---|---|---|---|---|---|---|
| 1 | Atlanta Silverbacks (S) | 12 | 6 | 3 | 3 | 20 | 15 | +5 | 21 | Soccer Bowl 2013 |
| 2 | Carolina RailHawks | 12 | 5 | 5 | 2 | 20 | 16 | +4 | 20 | |
| 3 | San Antonio Scorpions | 12 | 6 | 2 | 4 | 19 | 15 | +4 | 20 | |
| 4 | Tampa Bay Rowdies | 12 | 5 | 3 | 4 | 21 | 16 | +5 | 18 | |
| 5 | FC Edmonton | 12 | 3 | 5 | 4 | 13 | 12 | +1 | 14 | |
| 6 | Minnesota United FC | 12 | 4 | 2 | 6 | 18 | 23 | −5 | 14 | |
| 7 | Fort Lauderdale Strikers | 12 | 2 | 2 | 8 | 10 | 24 | −14 | 8 | |

Source: NASL Standings
Rules for classification: 1) points; 2) goal difference; 3) number of goals scored.
(S) Spring season champion

==== Fall Season ====
The New York Cosmos will join the league during the Fall season. Puerto Rico Islanders, originally planned to take part in this season, announced taking one year off due to restructuring.

| Pos | Team | Pld | W | D | L | GF | GA | GD | Pts | Qualification |
|---|---|---|---|---|---|---|---|---|---|---|
| 1 | New York Cosmos (F) | 14 | 9 | 4 | 1 | 22 | 12 | +10 | 31 | Soccer Bowl 2013 |
| 2 | Carolina RailHawks | 14 | 7 | 2 | 5 | 21 | 16 | +5 | 23 | |
| 3 | Tampa Bay Rowdies | 14 | 5 | 5 | 4 | 30 | 27 | +3 | 20 | |
| 4 | Minnesota United FC | 14 | 6 | 2 | 6 | 21 | 19 | +2 | 20 | |
| 5 | Fort Lauderdale Strikers | 14 | 5 | 3 | 6 | 18 | 20 | −2 | 18 | |
| 6 | FC Edmonton | 14 | 3 | 7 | 4 | 13 | 14 | −1 | 16 | |
| 7 | Atlanta Silverbacks | 14 | 4 | 4 | 6 | 14 | 22 | −8 | 16 | |
| 8 | San Antonio Scorpions | 14 | 3 | 1 | 10 | 15 | 24 | −9 | 10 | |

Source: NASL Standings
Rules for classification: 1) points; 2) goal difference; 3) number of goals scored.
(F) Fall season champion

==== Soccer Bowl 2013 ====
Soccer Bowl 2013 was contested by the winners of the spring and fall seasons. The game was hosted by the winner of the spring season.

November 9, 2013
7:00 PM EDT

| Atlanta Silverbacks | 0–1 | New York Cosmos |

Atlanta Silverbacks Park
Chamblee, Georgia

=== USL Pro ===
For the first time, all USL Pro teams will play every other team in a home-and-away arrangement, like most European leagues. The only exception will be Antigua Barracuda FC, which will play all their matches on the road, giving every other team 13 home matches against other USL Pro teams.

On January 23, 2013, USL Pro announced an alliance with Major League Soccer. For the 2013 season, four MLS teams will affiliate with USL Pro teams in lieu of participating in the MLS Reserve League system. These MLS clubs will loan at least four of their reserve players to their USL Pro affiliate club for development purposes.

All USL Pro teams will play two matches each with the remaining MLS Reserve League teams. Those matches will count toward USL Pro standings, giving each team a total of 26 games.

The following teams will affiliate:

- Sporting Kansas City — Orlando City Soccer Club
- New England Revolution — Rochester Rhinos
- D.C. United — Richmond Kickers
- Philadelphia Union — Harrisburg City Islanders

USL Pro teams will play MLS Reserve teams as listed below. Except for Antigua Barracuda FC (who will play two MLS reserve teams on the road), each set will be a home-and-away arrangement.

- Antigua Barracuda FC — FC Dallas and San Jose Earthquakes
- Charleston Battery — Houston Dynamo
- Charlotte Eagles — Chicago Fire
- Dayton Dutch Lions — Columbus Crew
- Harrisburg City Islanders — Colorado Rapids
- Los Angeles Blues — Los Angeles Galaxy
- Orlando City — Seattle Sounders FC
- Pittsburgh Riverhounds — Toronto FC
- Phoenix FC — Real Salt Lake
- Richmond Kickers — Vancouver Whitecaps FC
- Rochester Rhinos — Montreal Impact
- VSI Tampa Bay FC — Portland Timbers
- Wilmington Hammerheads — New York Red Bulls

The USL Pro season will begin on March 23, 2013. The first matches with MLS Reserve League teams will take place on April 7, 2013.

==== Overall table ====
| Pos | Team | Pld | W | T | L | GF | GA | GD | Pts | Qualification |
|---|---|---|---|---|---|---|---|---|---|---|
| 1 | Richmond Kickers (C) | 26 | 15 | 10 | 1 | 51 | 24 | +27 | 55 | Commissioner's Cup, Playoffs |
| 2 | Orlando City (A) | 26 | 16 | 6 | 4 | 54 | 26 | +28 | 54 | Playoffs |
| 3 | Charleston Battery (A) | 26 | 13 | 6 | 7 | 48 | 29 | +19 | 45 | Playoffs |
| 4 | Harrisburg City Islanders (A) | 26 | 14 | 2 | 10 | 55 | 39 | +16 | 44 | Playoffs |
| 5 | Charlotte Eagles (A) | 26 | 10 | 11 | 5 | 44 | 39 | +5 | 41 | Playoffs |
| 6 | Los Angeles Blues (A) | 26 | 11 | 7 | 8 | 52 | 37 | +15 | 40 | Playoffs |
| 7 | Pittsburgh Riverhounds (A) | 26 | 10 | 8 | 8 | 36 | 33 | +3 | 38 | Playoffs |
| 8 | Dayton Dutch Lions (A) | 26 | 10 | 7 | 9 | 43 | 46 | −3 | 37 | Playoffs |
| 9 | Wilmington Hammerheads | 26 | 11 | 4 | 11 | 35 | 39 | −4 | 36 (Note: Wilmington were deducted one point for fielding an ineligible player on July 21 against Pittsburgh.) | |
| 10 | VSI Tampa Bay | 26 | 9 | 5 | 12 | 41 | 39 | +2 | 32 | |
| 11 | Rochester Rhinos | 26 | 6 | 10 | 10 | 25 | 39 | −14 | 28 | |
| 12 | Phoenix FC | 26 | 5 | 7 | 14 | 28 | 41 | −13 | 22 | |
| 13 | Antigua Barracuda | 26 | 0 | 0 | 26 | 11 | 91 | −80 | 0 | |

Source: USL Pro official standings
Rules for classification: 1) points; 2) goal difference; 3) number of goals scored.
(A) Advances to USL Pro Playoffs; (C) Commissioner's Cup (best regular season record)

==== USL Pro playoffs ====
Quarter-finals
1 | Richmond Kickers | 1
8 | Dayton Dutch Lions | 0
4 | Harrisburg City Islanders | 1
5 | Charlotte Eagles | 3
2 | Orlando City | 5
7 | Pittsburgh Riverhounds | 0
3 | Charleston Battery | 2
6 | Los Angeles Blues | 1

Semi-finals
1 | Richmond Kickers | 1
5 | Charlotte Eagles | 2
2 | Orlando City | 3
3 | Charleston Battery | 2

USL PRO Championship
5 | Charlotte Eagles | 4
2 | Orlando City | 7

==== USL Pro Championship ====
September 7, 2013
7:30 pm EDT

| Orlando City | 7–4 | Charlotte Eagles |
|---|---|---|
| Dwyer 33', 42', 61' (pen.), 69'; Chin 70', 90'; Boden (yellow card) 71'; Mbengue 85' | Report; Report; Report; Report | Okiomah 20'; Ramirez 43', 58'; Asante (yellow card) 86'; Meza 88' |

Citrus Bowl, Orlando, Florida
Attendance: 20,886
Referee: Ismail Elfath

=== National Women's Soccer League ===
The inaugural NWSL season began on April 13 and concluded on August 18. The Portland Thorns won the first NWSL Championship, defeating NWSL Shield winner Western New York Flash 2–0 on August 31.

==== Overall table ====
| Pos | Team | Pld | W | D | L | GF | GA | GD | Pts | Qualification |
|---|---|---|---|---|---|---|---|---|---|---|
| 1 | Western New York Flash | 22 | 10 | 8 | 4 | 36 | 20 | +16 | 38 | NWSL Shield |
| 2 | FC Kansas City | 22 | 11 | 5 | 6 | 34 | 22 | +12 | 38 | NWSL Playoffs |
| 3 | Portland Thorns FC (C) | 22 | 11 | 5 | 6 | 32 | 25 | +7 | 38 | NWSL Playoffs |
| 4 | Sky Blue FC | 22 | 10 | 6 | 6 | 31 | 26 | +5 | 36 | NWSL Playoffs |
| 5 | Boston Breakers | 22 | 8 | 6 | 8 | 35 | 34 | +1 | 30 | |
| 6 | Chicago Red Stars | 22 | 8 | 6 | 8 | 32 | 36 | −4 | 30 | |
| 7 | Seattle Reign FC | 22 | 5 | 3 | 14 | 22 | 36 | −14 | 18 | |
| 8 | Washington Spirit | 22 | 3 | 5 | 14 | 16 | 39 | −23 | 14 | |

Source: soccerway.com
Rules for classification: Tiebreakers
(C) Champions

==== NWSL playoffs ====
Semi-finals
1 | Western New York Flash | 2
4 | Sky Blue FC | 0
2 | FC Kansas City | 2
3 | Portland Thorns FC (AET) | 3

Championship
1 | Western New York Flash | 0
3 | Portland Thorns FC | 2

==== NWSL Championship ====
| August 31, 2013 | Western New York Flash | 0–2 | Portland Thorns FC | Rochester, New York |
| 8:00 pm EDT | Johnson (yellow card) 33'; Martin (yellow card) 74' | Report; Report | Heath 40'; Williamson (yellow card) 49' (red card) 57'; Long (yellow card) 89'; Ellertson (yellow card) 90'; Sinclair 90+' | Stadium: Sahlen's Stadium; Attendance: 9,129; Referee: Kari Seitz |

== US Open Cup ==
The 100th edition of the annual national championship, the 2013 Lamar Hunt U.S. Open Cup, ran from May 7 through October 2. Sporting Kansas City, the defending champions, were eliminated in the fourth round (round of 16) by USL Pro side Orlando City.

D.C. United defeated Real Salt Lake 1–0 in the final to qualify for the 2014–15 CONCACAF Champions League Group stage.

== Honors ==
=== Professional ===
Men
| Competition | | Winner |
|---|---|---|
| U.S. Open Cup | | D.C. United |
| MLS Supporters' Shield | | New York Red Bulls |
| MLS Cup | | Sporting Kansas City |
| NASL | Spring season | Atlanta Silverbacks |
| NASL | Fall season | New York Cosmos |
| NASL | Soccer Bowl | New York Cosmos |
| USL Pro | Regular season | Richmond Kickers |
| USL Pro | Playoffs | Orlando City SC |

Women
| Competition | Winner |
|---|---|
| NWSL Championship | Portland Thorns FC |
| NWSL Shield | Western New York Flash |
| W-League | Pali Blues |
| Women's Premier Soccer League | San Diego WFC SeaLions |

=== Amateur ===
Men
| Competition | Team |
|---|---|
| USL Premier Development League | Austin Aztex |
| National Premier Soccer League | RVA Football Club |
| NCAA Division I Soccer Championship | Notre Dame |
| NCAA Division II Soccer Championship | Southern New Hampshire |
| NCAA Division III Soccer Championship | Messiah College |
| NAIA Soccer Championship | Martin Methodist (TN) |

Women
| Competition | Team |
|---|---|
| NCAA Division I Soccer Championship | UCLA |
| NCAA Division II Soccer Championship | Grand Valley State |
| NCAA Division III Soccer Championship | William Smith |
| NAIA Soccer Championship | Concordia (OR) |

== American clubs in international competition ==
| Club | Competition | Final round |
|---|---|---|
| Houston Dynamo | 2012–13 CONCACAF Champions League | Quarterfinals |
| Los Angeles Galaxy | 2012–13 CONCACAF Champions League | Semifinals |
| Seattle Sounders FC | 2012–13 CONCACAF Champions League | Semifinals |
| Houston Dynamo | 2013–14 CONCACAF Champions League | Group stage |
| Los Angeles Galaxy | 2013–14 CONCACAF Champions League | Quarterfinals |
| San Jose Earthquakes | 2013–14 CONCACAF Champions League | Quarterfinals |
| Sporting Kansas City | 2013–14 CONCACAF Champions League | Quarterfinals |

=== 2012–13 Champions League ===
==== Houston Dynamo ====
| March 5, 2013 Quarterfinals | Houston Dynamo (United States) | 1–0 | (Mexico) Santos Laguna | Houston, United States |
| 20:00 UTC−06 | Davis 89' | Report | | Stadium: BBVA Compass Stadium; Attendance: 17,454; Referee: Roberto Moreno (Panama) |

| March 13, 2013 Quarterfinals | Santos Laguna (Mexico) | 3–0 (3–1 agg.) | (United States) Houston Dynamo | Torreón, Mexico |
| 20:00 UTC−06 | Rodríguez 23'; Gomez 28'; Salinas (yellow card) 30'; Marc Crosas 76' | Summary | Creavalle (yellow card) 22' | Stadium: Estadio Corona; Attendance: 27,563; Referee: (Suriname) Enrico Wijingaarde |

==== Los Angeles Galaxy ====
| March 7, 2013 Quarterfinals | Herediano (Costa Rica) | 0–0 | (United States) Los Angeles Galaxy | Heredia, Costa Rica |
| 20:00 UTC−06 | | Summary | | Stadium: Estadio Eladio Rosabal Cordero; Attendance: 4,314; Referee: (Jamaica) Courtney Campbell |

| March 13, 2013 Quarterfinals | Los Angeles Galaxy (United States) | 4–1 (4–1 agg.) | (Costa Rica) Herediano | Carson, United States |
| 22:00 UTC−07 | Gonzalez 18'; Juninho (yellow card) 43'; Villarreal 69'; Keane 83'; Franklin (yellow card) 89'; McBean 90+3' | Summary | Salazar (yellow card) 71'; Yendrick Ruiz (yellow card) 75'; Elías Aguilar 85' | Stadium: Estadio Eladio Rosabal Cordero; Attendance: 8,284; Referee: (Guatemala) Walter Lopez |

| April 3, 2013 Semifinals | Los Angeles Galaxy (United States) | 1–2 | (Mexico) Monterrey | Carson, United States |
| 19:00 PST | DeLaGarza 28' | Report | Suazo 82' de Nigris 90' | Stadium: Home Depot Center; Referee: Hugo Cruz (CRC) |

| April 10, 2013 Semifinals | Monterrey (Mexico) | 1–0 (3–1 agg.) | (United States) Los Angeles Galaxy | Monterrey, Mexico |
| | de Nigris 81' | Report | | Stadium: Estadio Tecnológico; Attendance: 32,234; Referee: Roberto Moreno (Panama) |

==== Seattle Sounders FC ====
| March 6, 2013 Quarterfinals | UANL (Mexico) | 1–0 | (United States) Seattle Sounders FC | San Nicolás de los Garza, Mexico |
| 22:00 UTC−06 | | | | Stadium: Estadio Universitario |

| March 12, 2013 Quarterfinals | Seattle Sounders FC (United States) | 3–1 (3–2 agg.) | (Mexico) UANL | Seattle, United States |
| 22:00 UTC−07 | | | | Stadium: CenturyLink Field |

| April 2, 2013 Semifinals | Seattle Sounders FC (United States) | 0–1 | (Mexico) Santos Laguna | Seattle, United States |
| 19:00 PST | | Report | Gomez 54' | Stadium: CenturyLink Field; Attendance: 21,057; Referee: Hector Rodriguez (HON) |

| April 9, 2013 Semifinals | Santos Laguna (Mexico) | 1–1 (2–1 agg.) | (United States) Seattle Sounders FC | Torreón, Mexico |
| | Quintero 21' | Report | Neagle 73' | Stadium: Estadio Corona; Attendance: 19,595; Referee: Joel Aguilar (El Salvador) |

=== 2013–14 Champions League ===
==== Houston Dynamo ====
| August 20, 2013 Group stage | W Connection (Trinidad and Tobago) | 0–0 | (United States) Houston Dynamo | Hasely Crawford Stadium, Port of Spain |
| 20:00 | | Report | | Attendance: 1,500; Referee: Marco Antonio Rodríguez (Mexico) |

| August 27, 2013 Group stage | Houston Dynamo (United States) | 2–1 | (Panama) Árabe Unido | BBVA Compass Stadium, Houston |
| 20:00 | Weaver 23', 76' | Report | Arroyo 8' (pen.) | Attendance: 12,694; Referee: Hugo Cruz (Costa Rica) |

| September 25, 2013 Group stage | Houston Dynamo (United States) | 2–0 | (Trinidad and Tobago) W Connection | BBVA Compass Stadium, Houston |
| 20:00 | Johnson 39'; Boswell 52' | Report | | Attendance: 11,933; Referee: Ricardo Montero (Costa Rica) |

| October 24, 2013 Group stage | Árabe Unido (Panama) | 1–0 | (United States) Houston Dynamo | Estadio Agustín Sánchez, La Chorrera |
| 20:00 | González 61' | Report | | Referee: Courtney Campbell (Jamaica) |

==== LA Galaxy ====
| August 20, 2013 Group stage | LA Galaxy (United States) | 2–0 | (Costa Rica) Cartaginés | StubHub Center, Carson |
| 22:00 | Keane 66', 90+4' | Report | | Attendance: 9,474; Referee: Héctor Rodríguez (Honduras) |

| September 18, 2013 Group stage | LA Galaxy (United States) | 1–0 | (El Salvador) Isidro Metapán | StubHub Center, Carson |
| 22:00 | Courtois 7' | Report | | Attendance: 6,211; Referee: Hugo Cruz (Costa Rica) |

| September 25, 2013 Group stage | Cartaginés (Costa Rica) | 0–3 | (United States) LA Galaxy | Estadio Nacional de Costa Rica, San José |
| 22:00 | | Report | McBean 6'; Hoffman 18'; Courtois 29' | Referee: John Pitti (Panama) |

| October 24, 2013 Group stage | Isidro Metapán (El Salvador) | 4–0 | (United States) LA Galaxy | Estadio Cuscatlán, San Salvador |
| 22:00 | Muñoz 30', 31', 33', 41' | Report | | Referee: Paul Delgadillo (Mexico) |

==== San Jose Earthquakes ====
| August 7, 2013 Group stage | Montreal Impact (Canada) | 1–0 | (United States) San Jose Earthquakes | Saputo Stadium, Montreal |
| 20:00 | Camara 17' | Report | | Attendance: 15,115; Referee: Javier Santos (Puerto Rico) |

| August 28, 2013 Group stage | Heredia (Guatemala) | 1–0 | (United States) San Jose Earthquakes | Estadio Cementos Progreso, Guatemala City |
| 22:00 | Miranda 68' | Report | | Referee: José Alfredo Peñaloza (Mexico) |

| September 17, 2013 Group stage | San Jose Earthquakes (United States) | 3–0 | (Canada) Montreal Impact | Buck Shaw Stadium, Santa Clara |
| 22:00 | Wondolowski 21'; Chávez 57'; Salinas 84' | Report | | Referee: Armando Castro (Honduras) |

| October 23, 2013 Group stage | San Jose Earthquakes (United States) | 1–0 | (Guatemala) Heredia | Buck Shaw Stadium, Santa Clara |
| 22:00 | Wondolowski 62' | Report | | Referee: Roberto García (Mexico) |

==== Sporting Kansas City ====
| August 7, 2013 Group stage | Real Estelí (Nicaragua) | 0–2 | (United States) Sporting Kansas City | Estadio Independencia, Estelí |
| 22:00 | | Report | Opara 33'; Dwyer 76' | Referee: Jafeth Perea (Panama) |

| August 27, 2013 Group stage | Olimpia (Honduras) | 0–2 | (United States) Sporting Kansas City | Estadio Tiburcio Carías Andino, Tegucigalpa |
| 22:00 | | Report | Saad 27', 68' (pen.) | Referee: Henry Bejarano (Costa Rica) |

| September 17, 2013 Group stage | Sporting Kansas City (United States) | 1–1 | (Nicaragua) Real Estelí | Sporting Park, Kansas City |
| 20:00 | Peterson 78' | Report | Calero 54' | Attendance: 18,467; Referee: Sandy Vásquez (Dominican Republic) |

| October 23, 2013 Group stage | Sporting Kansas City (United States) | 0–0 | (Honduras) Olimpia | Sporting Park, Kansas City |
| 20:00 | | Report | | Attendance: 18,467; Referee: Joel Aguilar (El Salvador) |
