= Bernardo Hernández (footballer, born 1993) =

Mexican footballer (born 1993)

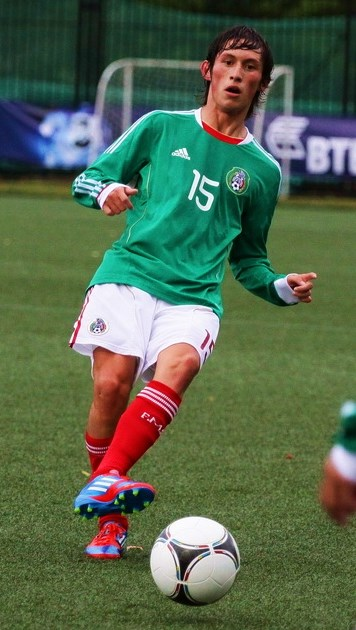
- Bernardo Hernández playing for Mexico U20 in 2012.

Personal information
- Full name: Bernardo Hernández de León
- Date of birth: 10 June 1993 (age 33)
- Place of birth: Cadereyta Jiménez, Nuevo León, Mexico
- Height: 1.72 m (5 ft 8 in)
- Position: Left-back

Senior career*
Years	Team	Apps	(Gls)
2012–2017	Monterrey	15	(0)
2016–2017	→ Tampico Madero (loan)	9	(0)
2018	Pacific	15	(0)

International career
2013	Mexico U20	9	
2014	Mexico U21	10	
2014	Mexico U22	2	(0)
Medal record
Representing Mexico
Winner	CONCACAF U-20 Championship	2013
- * Club domestic league appearances and goals

Bernardo Hernández de León (born 10 June 1993) is a Mexican former footballer that last played for Pacific on loan from Monterrey in Liga MX.

He was born in Cadereyta Jiménez, Nuevo León, and has represented Mexico at the 2013 CONCACAF U-20 Championship, 2013 FIFA U-20 World Cup and the 2014 Central American and Caribbean Games.

== Honours ==
Mexico U20

- CONCACAF U-20 Championship: 2013
- Central American and Caribbean Games: 2014
