= 2013 CONCACAF U-20 Championship =

Premundial CONCACAF Sub-20 2013 (in Spanish)
- 2013 CONCACAF U-20 Championship official logo

Tournament details
- Host country: Mexico
- City: Puebla
- Dates: 18 February – 3 March
- Teams: 12 (from 1 confederation)
- Venues: 2 (in 1 host city)

Final positions
- Champions: Mexico (12th title)
- Runners-up: United States
- Third place: El Salvador
- Fourth place: Cuba

Tournament statistics
- Matches played: 20
- Goals scored: 65 (3.25 per match)
- Top scorer: (Panama) Amet Ramírez (4 goals)
- Best player: (Mexico) Antonio Briseño
- Best goalkeeper: (Mexico) Richard Sánchez
- Fair play award: El Salvador

The 2013 CONCACAF Under-20 Championship was an association football tournament that took place in Mexico between 18 February and 3 March 2013. The CONCACAF Under-20 Championship determined the four CONCACAF teams that would participate at the 2013 FIFA U-20 World Cup.

== Qualified teams ==
Four teams qualified through the Central American qualifying tournament and five qualified through the Caribbean qualifying tournament.

Team	Qualification	Appearances	Previous best performances	World Cup Participations
North American zone
Canada	Automatic	20th	Champions (1986, 1996)	8
Mexico (TH)	Hosts	23rd	Champions (1962, 1970, **1973**, 1974, 1976, 1978, 1980, 1984, 1990, 1992, 2011)	12
United States	Automatic	21st	Runners-up **(1980**, 1982, 1986, 1992, 2009)	12
Central American zone qualified through the Central America qualifying
Costa Rica	Group A winners	18th	Champions (1988, 2009)	8
El Salvador	Group B winners	14th	Champions (1964)	
Nicaragua	Group A runners-up	8th	Second round (1976)	
Panama	Group B runners-up	8th	Fourth place (2011)	4
Caribbean zone qualified through the Caribbean qualifying
Haiti	Group A winners	6th	Second round (1978)	
Jamaica	Group B winners	18th	Third place (1970)	1
Puerto Rico	Group A runners-up	7th	First round (1974, **1976**, 1978, 1980, 1982, 1984)	
Cuba	Group B runners-up	11th	Runners-up (**1970**, 1974)	
Curaçao	Best third place finisher	12th	Third place (1962)	

Note: no titles or runners-up between 1998 and 2007.
Bold indicates that the corresponding team was hosting the event.

== Venues ==
2013 CONCACAF U-20 Championship is located in Mexico	Puebla	
2013 CONCACAF U-20 Championship is located in Mexico	Estadio Cuauhtemoc	Estadio Olímpico de C.U.
2013 CONCACAF U-20 Championship is located in Mexico	Capacity: 49,000	Capacity: 20,700

== Group stage ==
The draw for the group stage was made on 21 November 2012. All times listed are local time (UTC−06:00).

Key to colours in group tables
Top two teams in each group advanced to the quarter-finals

=== Group A ===
Team	Pld	W	D	L	GF	GA	GD	Pts
United States	2	2	0	0	3	1	+2	6
Costa Rica	2	1	0	1	1	1	0	3
Haiti	2	0	0	2	1	3	−2	0

18 February 2013
17:30

Haiti	1–2	United States
Jean-Dany 49'	Report	Gil 3' (pen.); Cuevas 26'

Estadio Olímpico de C.U., Puebla
Attendance: 3,827
Referee: Jafeth Perea (Panama)

20 February 2013
17:30

Costa Rica	1–0	Haiti
Ruíz 22'	Report

Estadio Olímpico de C.U., Puebla
Attendance: 3,128
Referee: Óscar Reyna (Guatemala)

22 February 2013
17:30

United States	1–0	Costa Rica
Villarreal 63'	Report

Estadio Olímpico de C.U., Puebla
Attendance: 3,123
Referee: Enrico Wijngaarde (Suriname)

=== Group B ===
Team	Pld	W	D	L	GF	GA	GD	Pts
Cuba	2	2	0	0	5	1	+4	6
Canada	2	1	0	1	6	3	+3	3
Nicaragua	2	0	0	2	1	8	−7	0

18 February 2013
20:00

Cuba	2–1	Canada
Reyes 69', 78'	Report	Vukovic 90'

Estadio Olímpico de C.U., Puebla
Attendance: 3,827
Referee: José Alfredo Peñaloza (Mexico)

20 February 2013
20:00

Nicaragua	0–3	Cuba
	Report	Diz 28'; Luis 47'; Reyes 64'

Estadio Olímpico de C.U., Puebla
Attendance: 3,128
Referee: Sherwin Johnson (Guyana)

22 February 2013
20:00

Canada	5–1	Nicaragua
Piette 6'; Clarke 28', 53'; Eustáquio 38' (pen.); McKendry 63'	Report	Pavón 45' (pen.)

Estadio Olímpico de C.U., Puebla
Attendance: 3,123
Referee: Javier Santos (Puerto Rico)

=== Group C ===
Team	Pld	W	D	L	GF	GA	GD	Pts
Panama	2	2	0	0	8	0	+8	6
Jamaica	2	1	0	1	4	5	−1	3
Puerto Rico	2	0	0	2	1	8	−7	0

19 February 2013
17:30

Puerto Rico	1–4	Jamaica
Strain 22'	Report	Holness 8'; Lowe 60'; Anderson 69', 82'

Estadio Cuauhtemoc, Puebla
Attendance: 21,000
Referee: Hugo Cruz (Costa Rica)

21 February 2013
17:30

Panama	4–0	Puerto Rico
Ramírez 10', 87'; Chen 84'; González 90+2'	Report

Estadio Cuauhtemoc, Puebla
Attendance: 4,635
Referee: David Gantar (Canada)

23 February 2013
15:30

Jamaica	0–4	Panama
	Report	Ramírez 45', 57'; Piggott 79'; Jiménez 84'

Estadio Cuauhtemoc, Puebla
Attendance: 12,886
Referee: Edvin Jurisevic (United States)

=== Group D ===
Team	Pld	W	D	L	GF	GA	GD	Pts
Mexico	2	2	0	0	6	0	+6	6
El Salvador	2	1	0	1	2	4	−2	3
Curaçao	2	0	0	2	1	5	−4	0

19 February 2013
20:00

Mexico	3–0	Curaçao
Corona 21', 33'; Bueno 35'	Report

Estadio Cuauhtemoc, Puebla
Attendance: 34,236
Referee: David Gantar (Canada)

21 February 2013
20:00

El Salvador	2–1	Curaçao
Ayala 25'; Mejía 65'	Report	Merencia 76'

Estadio Cuauhtemoc, Puebla
Attendance: 4,618
Referee: Raúl Castro Zuniga (Honduras)

23 February 2013
18:00

Mexico	3–0	El Salvador
Escoboza 15'; Gómez 53'; Ayala 87' (o.g.)	Report

Estadio Cuauhtemoc, Puebla
Attendance: 37,302
Referee: Hugo Cruz (Costa Rica)

== Knockout stage ==
Quarter-final
26 February
United States	4
Canada	2
26 February
Cuba	2
Costa Rica	1
27 February
Panama	1
El Salvador	3
27 February
Mexico	4
Jamaica	0

Semi-final
1 March
United States	2
Cuba	0
1 March
El Salvador	0
Mexico	2

Final
3 March
United States	1
Mexico (a.e.t.)	3
Third place
3 March
Cuba	0
El Salvador	1

=== Quarter-finals ===
The quarter-final winners qualified for the 2013 FIFA U-20 World Cup.

26 February 2013
17:00

United States	4–2	Canada
Gil 29'; Villarreal 40', 54'; Trapp 45+1'	Report	Carreiro 23'; Piette 64'

Estadio Olímpico de C.U., Puebla
Attendance: 1,500
Referee: Javier Santos (Puerto Rico)

26 February 2013
20:00

Cuba	2–1	Costa Rica
Hernandez 13', 80'	Report	Ramirez 40'

Estadio Olímpico de C.U., Puebla
Attendance: 1,685
Referee: José Alfredo Peñaloza (Mexico)

27 February 2013
17:00

Panama	1–3	El Salvador
Jiménez 33'	Report	Henríquez 55', 90+3'; Peña 80'

Estadio Cuauhtemoc, Puebla
Attendance: 9,980
Referee: Edvin Jurisevic (United States)

27 February 2013
20:00

Mexico	4–0	Jamaica
Zamorano 12'; Bueno 43'; Flores 67'; Escoboza 75'	Report

Estadio Cuauhtemoc, Puebla
Attendance: 39,700
Referee: Hugo Cruz (Costa Rica)

=== Semi-finals ===
1 March 2013
17:00

United States	2–0	Cuba
Rodriguez 7'; Cuevas 10'	Report

Estadio Cuauhtémoc, Puebla
Attendance: 10,568
Referee: Hugo Cruz (Costa Rica)

1 March 2013
20:00

El Salvador	0–2	Mexico
	Report	Briseño 76', 84'

Estadio Cuauhtémoc, Puebla
Attendance: 33,525
Referee: Óscar Reyna (Guatemala)

=== Third place playoff ===
3 March 2013
15:00

Cuba	0–1	El Salvador
	Report	González 90+1'

Estadio Cuauhtemoc, Puebla
Attendance: 17,140
Referee: Raúl Castro Zuniga (Honduras)

=== Final ===
3 March 2013
18:00

United States	1–3 (a.e.t.)	Mexico
Joya 10' (pen.)	Report	Corona 4'; Gómez 100'; Espericueta 113' (pen.)

Estadio Cuauhtemoc, Puebla
Attendance: 41,621
Referee: Enrico Wijngaarde (Suriname)

== Player awards ==
Top Goalscorer

- (Panama) Ameth Ramírez (4 goals)

Most Valuable Player of the tournament

- (Mexico) Antonio Briseño

Golden Glove

- (Mexico) Richard Sánchez

Team of the Tournament

Goalkeeper	Defenders	Midfielders	Forwards
(Mexico) Richard Sánchez	(Mexico) Francisco Flores (RB); (Mexico) Hedgardo Marin (RCB); (Mexico) Antonio Briseño (LCB); (Mexico) Bernardo Hernandez (LB)	(El Salvador) Jairo Henríquez (RM); (Mexico) Josecarlos Van Rankin (CM); (United States) Wil Trapp (CM); (United States) Luis Gil (LM)	(Panama) Ameth Ramírez (FW); (United States) Jose Villarreal (FW)

== Goalscorers ==
4 goals

- (Panama) Ameth Ramírez

3 goals

- (Cuba) Maykel Reyes
- (Mexico) Jesús Manuel Corona
- (United States) Jose Villarreal

2 goals

- (Canada) Caleb Clarke
- (Canada) Samuel Piette
- (Cuba) Arichel Hernandez
- (Jamaica) Kendan Anderson
- (El Salvador) Jairo Henríquez
- (Mexico) Antonio Briseño
- (Mexico) Marco Bueno
- (Mexico) Alonso Escoboza
- (Mexico) Julio Gómez
- (Panama) Jairo Jiménez
- (United States) Daniel Cuevas
- (United States) Luis Gil

1 goal

- (Canada) Dylan Carreiro
- (Canada) Mauro Eustáquio
- (Canada) Ben McKendry
- (Canada) Stefan Vukovic
- (Costa Rica) David Ramírez
- (Costa Rica) John Jairo Ruíz
- (Cuba) Adrián Diz
- (Cuba) Daniel Luis
- (Curaçao) Vidarrell Merencia
- (El Salvador) Olivier Ayala
- (El Salvador) Roberto González
- (El Salvador) Rommel Mejia
- (El Salvador) José Peña
- (Haiti) Maurice Jean-Dany
- (Jamaica) Omar Holness
- (Jamaica) Damion Lowe
- (Mexico) Jonathan Espericueta
- (Mexico) Francisco Flores
- (Mexico) Armando Zamorano
- (Nicaragua) Eulises Pavón
- (Panama) Roberto Chen
- (Panama) Alexander Gonzalez
- (Panama) Romario Piggott
- (Puerto Rico) Reid Strain
- (United States) Benji Joya
- (United States) Mario Rodriguez
- (United States) Wil Trapp

1 own goal

- (El Salvador) Olivier Ayala (playing against Mexico)

== Final ranking ==
Pos	Team	Pld	W	D	L	GF	GA	GD	Pts	Final result
1	Mexico (H)	5	5	0	0	15	1	+14	15	Champions
2	United States	5	4	0	1	10	6	+4	12	Runners-up
3	El Salvador	5	3	0	2	6	7	−1	9	Third place
4	Cuba	5	3	0	2	7	5	+2	9	Fourth Place
5	Panama	3	2	0	1	9	3	+6	6	Eliminated in Quarter-finals
6	Canada	3	1	0	2	8	7	+1	3	Eliminated in Quarter-finals
7	Costa Rica	3	1	0	2	2	3	−1	3	Eliminated in Quarter-finals
8	Jamaica	3	1	0	2	4	9	−5	3	Eliminated in Quarter-finals
9	Haiti	2	0	0	2	1	3	−2	0	Eliminated in Group stage
10	Curaçao	2	0	0	2	1	5	−4	0	Eliminated in Group stage
11	Nicaragua	2	0	0	2	1	8	−7	0	Eliminated in Group stage
12	Puerto Rico	2	0	0	2	1	8	−7	0	Eliminated in Group stage

Source: rsssf.com
(H) Hosts

Note: Per statistical convention in football, matches decided in extra time are counted as wins and losses, while matches decided by penalty shoot-out are counted as draws.

== Countries to participate in 2013 FIFA U-20 World Cup ==
The four semi-finalist teams qualified for the 2013 FIFA U-20 World Cup.

- Cuba
- El Salvador
- Mexico
- United States
