= Gustavo Rivera (footballer) =

Puerto Rican footballer

Personal information
- Date of birth: 4 June 1993 (age 33)
- Place of birth: San Juan, Puerto Rico
- Position: Defender

Youth career
- 2011–2012: IMG Academy

College career
Years	Team	Apps	(Gls)
2012–2013	Barry Buccaneers	13	(0)

International career^{‡}
2012–2013	Puerto Rico U20	7	(0)
2011–	Puerto Rico	2	(0)
- ‡ National team caps and goals as of 19 May 2012

Gustavo Rivera (born 4 June 1993) is a Puerto Rican international footballer who plays as a defender.

== Career ==
Rivera has played for IMG Academy.

After playing for the Puerto Rico under-20 team, he made his senior international debut for Puerto Rico in 2011, and has appeared in FIFA World Cup qualifying matches.
