= Pedro Jeanine =

Panamanian footballer (born 1993)

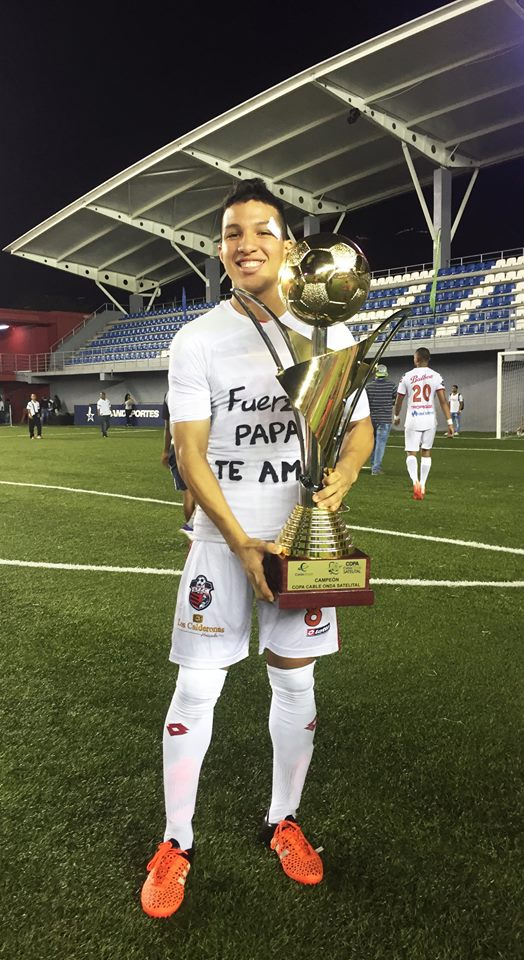
- Pedro Jeanine

Personal information
- Full name: Pedro Ernesto Jeanine Portillo
- Date of birth: 4 September 1993 (age 33)
- Place of birth: Panama City, Panama
- Height: 1.71 m (5 ft 7 1/2 in)
- Position: Defensive midfielder

Team information
- Current team: Universitario
- Number: 5

Youth career
- 2005–2010: San Francisco

Senior career*
Years	Team	Apps	(Gls)
2010–2018	San Francisco	163	(2)
2018–	San Francisco	8	(1)

International career^{‡}
2012–2013	Panama U20	6	(0)
2015	Panama U23	8	(0)
2014–	Panama	1	(0)
- * Club domestic league appearances and goals as of 4 October 2018 ‡ National team caps and goals as of 4 October 2018

Pedro Ernesto Jeanine Portillo (born 4 September 1993) is a Panamanian professional footballer who plays as a defensive midfielder for Unión Deportivo Universitario. He made his Panama senior international debut in August 2014.

== Club career ==
Jeanine started playing for San Francisco FC at the age of 13 where he came through the youth ranks and eventually debuted with the first team on 26 April 2010. So far he has led his team to two national titles (one league and one cup) making him the youngest Panamanian captain to having achieved this.

== International career ==
Jeanine was called up to the senior national team for a friendly match against Peru on 6 August 2014. He made his debut in the starting eleven; Panama lost 3–0.

At the 2015 Pan American Games in Toronto, Jeanine led the Panama national U23 team to a 4th place, after losing to Brazil 3-1.

== Honors ==
San Francisco

- Copa Cable Onda Satelital Apertura: 2015
- Apertura 2014 Champions: 2014
- Apertura 2010 Reserves: 2010
