= Jean Carlo =

- Born: Jean Carlo; 1943; São Paulo, Brazil
- Died: 2 July 2013 (aged 69–70) Campinas, São Paulo, Brazil
- Genres: ballad, rock
- Occupations: singer
- Instruments: vocal
- Years active: 1965–2013

Jean Carlo (1943 – July 2, 2013) was a Brazilian blind singer and instrumentalist who was successful during the Jovem Guarda era.

== Biography ==
After making a name for himself on freshman shows, in 1964 Jean Carlo took part in the program "Reino da Juventude", presented by Antonio Aguillar on TV Record. That's when he became known to the general public.

In 1965 he recorded a compact disc with the songs "Eu Nasci Pra Você", a version of an Italian hit, and Se Non Avessi Piu Te. In the same year, his first album was released on the Copacabana label, produced by Antonio Aguillar, entitled "Eu Nasci Pra Você" (I Was Born for You), which at the time was a big seller throughout the country, containing, among others, the song Aline (a version of the French original).

Jean Carlo took part in the Jovem Guarda program from its second edition, in 1965, at the Record Theater.

After recording his first album, he went on to play concerts all over the country and took part in various television programs of the time, including: Campeões de Popularidade (TV Excelsior, in Rio de Janeiro); Discoteca do Chacrinha; Um Instante Maestro (presented by Flávio Cavalcanti), Almoço com as Estrelas, Clube dos Artistas, A Grande Parada, Programa Silvio Santos, Astros do Disco, Programa Wilson Simonal (TV Record), Corte Rayol Show (TV Record), Globo de Ouro, Globo Music Hall, Noite de Gala, TV Fone.

In 1969 his second album was released, entitled "Preciso Olhar Pra Você", with the songs "Era Um Garoto Que Como Eu Amava os Beatles e os Rolling Stones" and "Travessia" by Milton Nascimento.

In December 1969, after the release of the two albums and fifteen compact discs, Jean moved to Argentina and started performing in various cities in that country and in Uruguay, including taking part in television programs. In 1970, Jean Carlo won the best performer award at the "Festival de Costa a Costa" in Piriápolis, Uruguay, singing in English and representing the United States.

=== Career singing in English ===
In the 1970s it became common for Brazilian musicians to record songs in English using a pseudonym. This was also the case with Jean Carlo.

In 1973, on the Top-Tape label, under the pseudonym Michael Davis, he recorded the big hit "Another Song", the theme of Rede Globo's soap opera "O Semideus". "Another Song", at the time, became the opening theme of Jornal Hoje, also on Rede Globo.

In 1974, under the pseudonym Edward Cliff, on the Central Park label, he recorded a compact disc with the songs "Country feeling" and "I'll Never Walk Alone Again", the latter a huge hit and also the theme of Rede Globo's soap opera Supermanoela, although it doesn't appear on the official soundtrack.

In the 1970s he often appeared on the programs "Barros de Alencar" and "Discoteca do Chacrinha", mainly singing in English, interpreting the big hits of the time.

In 1975, as Edward Cliff on the RCA Victor label, he recorded a double CD with the song "Nights Of September", which became a huge hit. This recording was released in Spanish in South America and in English in North America and Europe. In Brazil, it was released in Spanish and English.

The song "Nights Of September" spent 13 weeks at the top of the Italian charts. The recording of "Nights Of September" in English has been re-released several times in Brazil, the last of which was in 1999, on the compilation "Hits Again" (Som Livre).

Due to the success of Jean Carlo's recordings as Edward Cliff in 1977, a tour of Europe was planned, supported by the RCA Victor label. The trip didn't take place due to a change in management.

In 1977, still as Edward Cliff, he recorded the song "Summer Love", which was part of the international soundtrack for Rede Globo's soap opera "Sem Lenço, sem Documento". Jean also recorded compact discs and songs under the pseudonyms Steve Brandy, Gary Bristol, Peter Knapp, Steve Robinson and Marty Rivers.

== Jean Carlo as a Catholic singer ==
From 1975 he became part of the Catholic religious evangelization movement, giving talks and performing – singing and playing the organ – in churches and communities all over the country.

He visited more than 1,000 cities until 1987, during which time he developed his work of evangelization and community animation.

In the 1980s he took part in several religious-themed albums, including the series "Louvemos o Senhor" (Praise the Lord) (COMEP).

In 1996 he was invited to take part in the program Praise the Lord, produced by the Association of the Lord Jesus (ASJ), at the time broadcast on Rede Vida de Televisão. He then began to have greater contact with the evangelization work promoted by the entity. In the same year, he recorded ten tracks on the CD As Mais Lindas Canções da Igreja Católica (ASJ).

In 1998 he released the CD "Obrigado Senhor" by ASJ, containing the songs "Amazing Grace", "Creio Em Ti" and others. A music video was produced for the song "Olho em Tudo".

From 1998 to 1999 he took part in the television program "Deus Abençoe", broadcast on Rede Vida, which was always recorded in different cities.

== Death ==
The singer died in Campinas in 2013.

== Album ==
- As Edward Cliff

List of albums
| Title | Year | Label |
| "Nights of September" | 1977 | RCA Victor |

=== Singles ===
- As Edward Cliff

List of singles
| Title | Year | Label |
| "I'll Never Walk Alone Again | 1974 | Central Park Tapes |
| "Nights of September" | 1975 | RCA Victor |
| "Nights of September" / "I Had To Go" | 1975 | RCA Victor |
| "Nights of September" / "Sky" | 1976 | RCA Victor |
| "Nights of September" / "Sky" | 1976 | RCA Victor |
| "Nights of September" / "It's Only Love" (with Junior) | 1976 | RCA Victor |
| "Nights Of September / Let's Dance, Dance, Dance" (with George & Gwen McCrae) | 1976 | RCA Victor |
| "Summer Love" | 1977 | RCA |
| "Summer Of Love / There Will Be Another World" | 1977 | RCA |

- As Steve Robinson

List of singles
| Title | Year | Label |
| "Forever and Ever" | 1973 | One Way |

- As Marty Rivers

List of singles
| Title | Year | Label |
| "Skyline Pigeon / Don't Mess With Mister "T" | 1973 | One Way |

- As Gary Bristol

List of singles
| Title | Year | Label |
| "My Eyes Adored You" | 1975 | RCA Victor |

- As Steve Brandy

List of singles
| Title | Year | Label |
| "Let Me Be Forever" | 1975 | RCA Victor |
