= David Cabán =

Association football player

Personal information
- Date of birth: March 30, 1993 (age 33)
- Place of birth: Chicago, U.S.
- Position: Midfielder

Youth career
- 2007–2009: Chicago Magic
- 2009–2011: Chicago Fire

College career
Years	Team	Apps	(Gls)
2011–2014	Wisconsin Badgers	75	(2)

Senior career*
Years	Team	Apps	(Gls)
- Bridges FC
2016	Ånge		
2017	IFK Åmål		
2018	Beaumaris SC	19	(3)

International career^{‡}
2006–2007	United States U14		
2007–2008	United States U15		
2007–2008	United States U17		
2009–2010	United States U18		
2016	Puerto Rico	3	(0)
- * Club domestic league appearances and goals as of September 22, 2018 ‡ National team caps and goals as of 08:20, August 3, 2018 (UTC)

David Cabán (born March 30, 1993) is a soccer player who plays as a midfielder.

Born in the United States, he represented Puerto Rico at international level.

== Early and personal life ==
Cabán was born in Chicago, United States.

== Club career ==
Cabán played youth football for the Chicago Magic and the Chicago Fire, and college soccer with the Wisconsin Badgers from 2011 to 2014. He later played for Bridges FC before turning professional with Swedish club Ånge in July 2016.

He was also with Swedish side IFK Åmål in 2017.

He joined Australian club Beaumaris SC in 2018.

== International career ==
He represented the United States at youth international level, from under-14 to under-18.

He earned three caps for Puerto Rico in 2016.
