= Jason Coronel =

Nicaraguan footballer

Personal information
- Full name: Jason Coronel Martínez
- Date of birth: October 6, 1993 (age 33)
- Place of birth: Nicaragua
- Height: 1.75 m (5 ft 9 in)
- Position: Midfielder

Team information
- Current team: UNAN Managua
- Number: 6

Senior career*
Years	Team	Apps	(Gls)
2017	Diriangén FC		

International career^{‡}
2014–	Nicaragua	37	(0)
- * Club domestic league appearances and goals as of 2017 ‡ National team caps and goals as of 11 June 2025

Jason Coronel Martínez (born 10 September 1993) is a Nicaraguan footballer who plays for Diriangén FC.
