= Julio Gómez (footballer, born 1994) =

Mexican footballer

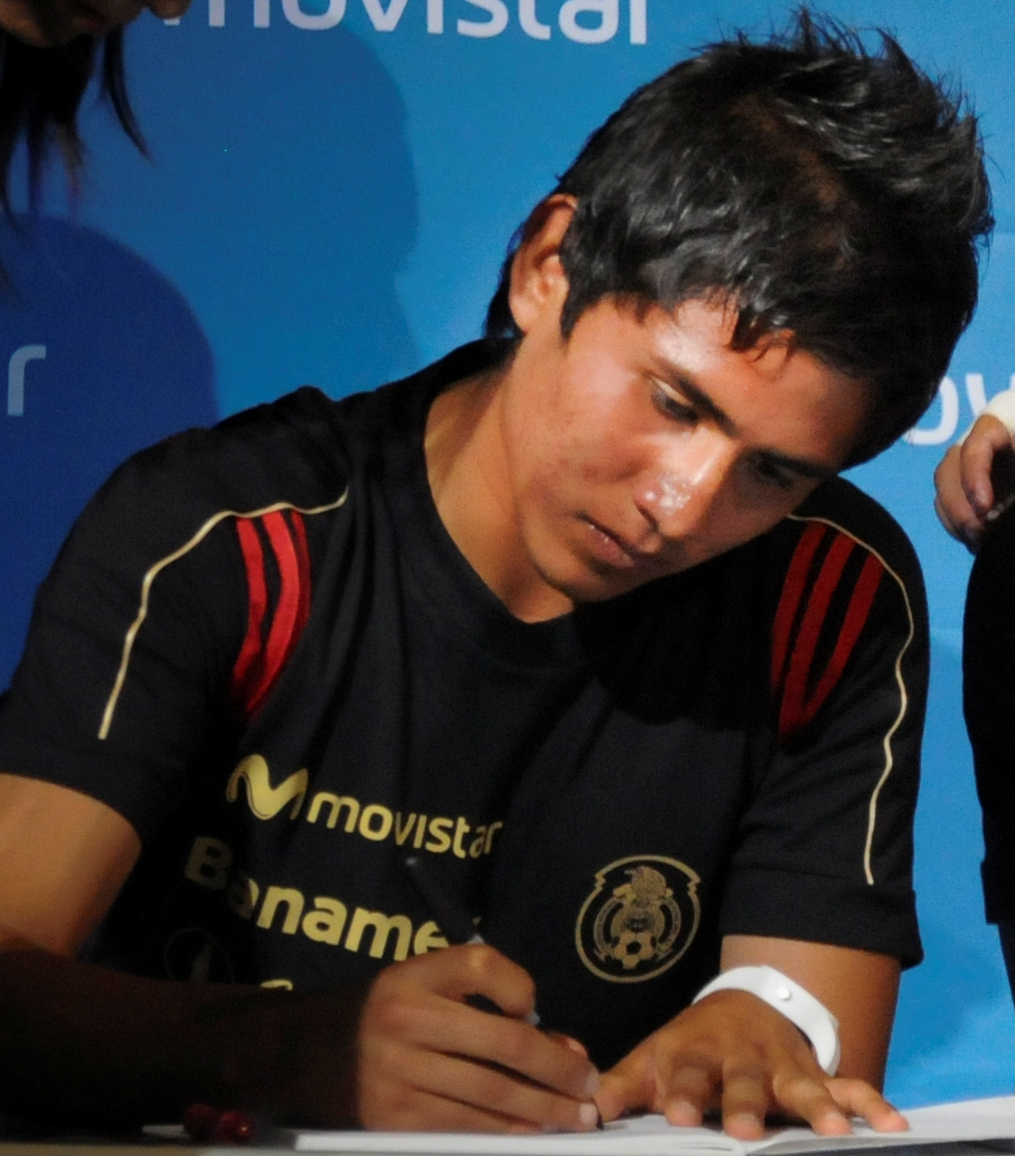
- Gómez with Mexico U17 in 2010

Personal information
- Full name: Julio Enrique Gómez González
- Date of birth: 13 August 1994 (age 32)
- Place of birth: Tampico, Tamaulipas, Mexico
- Height: 1.69 m (5 ft 7 in)
- Positions: Winger; attacking midfielder

Youth career
- 2010–2011: Pachuca

Senior career*
Years	Team	Apps	(Gls)
2011–2013	Pachuca	9	(0)
2014–2017	Guadalajara	7	(0)
2015	→ UAT (loan)	5	(0)
2015	→ Cafetaleros (loan)	16	(2)
2016	→ Chiapas (loan)	0	(0)
2016–2017	→ Coras (loan)	27	(3)
2017	→ Zacatepec (loan)	4	(0)
2018	Cruz Azul Hidalgo	15	(3)
2018–2019	Loros UdeC	29	(7)
Total		112	(15)

International career
2010–2011	Mexico U17	7	(3)
2013	Mexico U20	3	(2)
2014	Mexico U21	2	(0)
Medal record
Men's football
Representing Mexico
FIFA U-17 World Cup
Winner	2011 Mexico	Team
CONCACAF U-20 Championship
Winner	2013 Mexico	Team
- * Club domestic league appearances and goals

Julio Enrique Gómez González (Note: In this Spanish name, the first or paternal surname is Gómez and the second or maternal family name is González.) (born 13 August 1994), also known as "La Momia" (The Mummy), is a Mexican former professional footballer who played as a winger.

Gómez was a member of the Mexico national team that won the FIFA U-17 World Cup, held in Mexico in 2011. His outstanding performance in the tournament was recognized with the Golden Ball award.

== Club career ==
=== Pachuca ===
Julio Gomez (La Momia) made his debut for CF Pachuca against Santos Laguna in January 2011, in a game of 2011 Clausura He was then loaned to Correcaminos and scored 13 goals in Clausura 2015. He was declared MVP by Correcaminos. Then Pachuca loaned him to Cafetaleros de Tapachula for the 2015–16 season.

== International career ==
=== 2011 FIFA U-17 World Cup ===
Gómez was a regular starter in Mexico's squad. In the second match against Congo; Gómez scored one of the two goals from Mexico.

In the semifinal match against Germany he scored two goals, the first of them in the third minute. In the play that derived in the second goal for Mexico, an Olympic goal by Jonathan Espericueta, Gomez's head collided with Samed Yeşil's, after which he was left lying on the field, bleeding heavily. With no substitutions left, he returned to the field and scored the winning goal with a memorable bicycle kick in the last minutes of the match, and gave Mexico the pass to the final against Uruguay.

He was not a starter in the final. However, he entered the game in the 80th minute, receiving a standing ovation from the fans. Mexico ended up defeating Uruguay 2–0, winning the championship.

Gómez was awarded the Golden Ball of the tournament. In total, he scored three goals, and participated in all seven games - six as starter, and as a substitute in the final.

== Honours ==
Mexico U17

- FIFA U-17 World Cup: 2011

Mexico U20

- CONCACAF U-20 Championship: 2013

Individual

- FIFA U-17 World Cup Golden Ball: 2011
