= Daniel Cuevas =

American soccer player (born 1993)

Personal information
- Full name: Daniel Cuevas Granados
- Date of birth: July 23, 1993 (age 33)
- Place of birth: Sacramento, California, United States
- Height: 1.63 m (5 ft 4 in)
- Position: Winger

Youth career
- 2011–2013: Santos Laguna

Senior career*
Years	Team	Apps	(Gls)
2013–2015	Santos Laguna	0	(0)
2013–2015	→ Lobos BUAP (loan)	2	(1)
2015	→ Indy Eleven (loan)	1	(0)
2017	Sacramento Gold	12	(6)

International career^{‡}
2012–2013	United States U20	19	(5)
2014	United States U23	1	(0)
Medal record
Representing United States
Runner-up	CONCACAF U-20 Championship	2013
- * Club domestic league appearances and goals as of October 8, 2015 ‡ National team caps and goals as of August 16, 2014

Daniel Cuevas Granados (born July 23, 1993) is an American former professional soccer player who played as a winger.

== Club career ==
Cuevas came through Santos Laguna's academy, but never progressed past the U-20 level. In 2013, he moved to Ascenso MX club Lobos BUAP. He made his professional debut in a Copa MX match against Veracruz.

== International career ==
Born in the United States and of Mexican descent, Cuevas was a member of the United States U-20 team during the 2013 CONCACAF U-20 Championship and the 2013 FIFA U-20 World Cup.
