= Ameth Ramírez =

Panamanian footballer (born 1993)

Personal information
- Full name: Ameth Josueth Ramírez Bourdett
- Date of birth: 19 June 1993 (age 33)
- Place of birth: Panama
- Position: Midfielder

Senior career*
Years	Team	Apps	(Gls)
2009–2018	Plaza Amador		
2013–2014	→ Linces de Tlaxcala (loan)		
2016	→ Real Monarchs (loan)	8	(1)
2018	→ Isidro Metapán (loan)	21	(5)
2019	Sporting San Miguelito	8	(0)
2020	Costa del Este	4	(0)

International career
2012–2013	Panama U20	7	(5)
- * Club domestic league appearances and goals

Ameth Ramírez Bourdett (born 19 June 1993) is a Panamanian professional footballer.

== Club career ==
Ramírez left Plaza Amador for a week-long trial at Spanish giants Atlético Madrid in April 2013. He later moved abroad to play for Mexican third division side Linces de Tlaxcala, a satellite team of Pachuca who had declared interest in the player in August 2013. He returned to Plaza Amador in summer 2014.

=== Isidro Metapán ===
Ramírez signed with Isidro Metapán of the Salvadoran Primera División for the Clausura 2018 tournament. Ramírez scored his first goal for Isidro Metapán in a 1–2 defeat against Audaz at the Estadio Jorge Calero Suárez.
