= Mario Rodríguez (soccer, born 1994) =

American soccer player

Mario Rodriguez
Personal information
- Full name: Mario Andres Rodriguez Jr.
- Date of birth: May 12, 1994 (age 32)
- Place of birth: North Hollywood, California, United States
- Height: 1.84 m (6 ft 1/2 in)
- Position: Forward

Youth career
- LA Galaxy
- IMG Academy
- 2012–2013: 1. FC Kaiserslautern

Senior career*
Years	Team	Apps	(Gls)
2013–2016	Borussia Mönchengladbach II	81	(18)
2016–2018	Dynamo Dresden	0	(0)
2016	→ Chemnitzer FC (loan)	3	(0)
2017–2018	→ Sonnenhof Großaspach (loan)	24	(1)

International career^{‡}
2010–2011	United States U17	21	(1)
2012–2013	United States U20	13	(4)
2015–2016	United States U23	6	(2)
Medal record
Representing United States
Runner-up	CONCACAF U-20 Championship	2013
- * Club domestic league appearances and goals as of May 16, 2018 ‡ National team caps and goals as of October 3, 2017

Mario Andres Rodriguez Jr. (born May 12, 1994) is an American former professional soccer player.

== Club career ==
Rodriguez was born in North Hollywood, California. He came up through the LA Galaxy academy before joining the United States U17 residential academy. He later signed with Borussia Mönchengladbach, although he failed to make any first-team appearances, playing exclusively with Borussia Mönchengladbach II. He later signed with Dynamo Dresden before being loaned to Chemnitzer FC. On 3 January it was confirmed, that Rodriguez once more was loaned out, this time to Sonnenhof Großaspach.

== International career ==
Rodriguez was born in the United States and is of Mexican descent. Rodriguez has represented the United States at multiple youth levels.

== Honors ==
United States U17

- CONCACAF U-17 Championship: 2011
