= Benji Joya =

American soccer player (born 1993)

Personal information
- Full name: Héctor Benjamín Joya Jiménez
- Date of birth: September 22, 1993 (age 33)
- Place of birth: San Jose, California, United States
- Height: 1.73 m (5 ft 8 in)
- Position: Midfielder

Youth career
- 2009–2011: De Anza Force
- 2011–2012: Santos Laguna

Senior career*
Years	Team	Apps	(Gls)
2012–2016	Santos Laguna	4	(0)
2014	→ Chicago Fire (loan)	12	(1)
2015–2016	→ Necaxa (loan)	2	(0)
2016	Sporting Kansas City	0	(0)
2018–2019	Irapuato	0	(0)
2019–2020	Oakland Roots	6	(0)

International career^{‡}
2012–2013	United States U20	19	(4)
2014–2015	United States U23	4	(1)
Medal record
Representing United States
Runner-up	CONCACAF U-20 Championship	2013
- * Club domestic league appearances and goals as of March 17, 2020 ‡ National team caps and goals as of April 23, 2015

Héctor Benjamín "Benji" Joya Jiménez (born September 22, 1993) is an American former professional soccer player who played as a midfielder.

== Club career ==
=== Santos Laguna ===
Joya, who is of Mexican descent grew up in the Bay Area of California, played in the USSF Development Academy for De Anza Force. In early 2012, he joined Santos Laguna's organization. He began playing during the 2012 Clausura with the club's U-20 team. In September 2012, the midfielder made his first team debut in a Liga MX match.

=== Chicago Fire ===
Joya was loaned to Chicago Fire with an option to buy ahead of the 2014 MLS season. In the 2014 season opener, he made his MLS debut as a 63rd-minute substitute with his side was down 2–0. Seconds after making his way onto the field, a shot deflected by the Chivas USA keeper landed in front of him. He scored a left-footed shot inside the six yard box to put the Fire on the board, making it 2–1. That was Joya's first MLS touch and only league goal of the season.

=== Club Necaxa ===
Joya was loaned to Necaxa of the Ascenso MX for 2015–16.

=== Sporting Kansas City ===
Joya signed with Sporting Kansas City on September 15, 2016, before the MLS roster freeze.

=== Irapuato ===
On January 10, 2018, Joya signed with Mexican club Irapuato.

=== Oakland Roots SC ===
In April 2019, Joya signed with NISA expansion club Oakland Roots SC. He played in six of the team's games during both the Fall and Spring seasons. On September 8, 2019, Joya scored his first goal for Oakland against Liga MX side FC Juárez in an international friendly at Laney College, which the Roots lost 4–2.

On April 16, 2020, while the NISA season was on hiatus due to the COVID-19 pandemic, Joya was released from Oakland following an arrest the previous day.

== International career ==
Joya was a member of the United States U-20 squad at the 2013 FIFA U-20 World Cup.
