= 2020 CONCACAF U-20 Championship =

Tournament details
- Host country: Honduras
- Dates: Cancelled (originally 20 June – 5 July 2020)
- Teams: 20 (from 1 confederation)
- Venues: 2 (in 1 host city)

The 2020 CONCACAF U-20 Championship was originally to be the seventh edition of the CONCACAF U-20 Championship (28th edition if all eras included), the biennial international youth football championship organised by CONCACAF for the under-20 national teams of the North, Central American and Caribbean region. The tournament was originally scheduled to be held in Honduras between 20 June and 5 July 2020. However, on 13 May 2020, CONCACAF announced the decision to postpone the tournament due to the COVID-19 pandemic, with the new dates of the tournament to be confirmed later.

The final tournament would feature 20 teams, using the same format as the 2019 CONCACAF U-17 Championship. The top four teams of the tournament would have qualified for the 2021 FIFA U-20 World Cup in Indonesia as the CONCACAF representatives. However, FIFA announced on 17 November 2020 that this edition of the World Cup would be cancelled. Following this announcement, CONCACAF decided on 4 January 2021 that the 2020 CONCACAF U-20 Championship, which served as the regional qualifiers, would be cancelled.

The United States were the defending champions.

== Qualified teams ==
The format for qualification has changed since the 2016 edition (qualifying was not played in 2018). The qualifying competition no longer features Caribbean and Central American zones.

The 41 CONCACAF teams were ranked based on the CONCACAF Men's Under-20 Ranking as of June 2019. A total of 33 teams entered the tournament. The highest-ranked 16 entrants were exempt from qualifying and advanced directly to the group stage of the final tournament, while the lowest-ranked 17 entrants had to participate in qualifying, where the four group winners advanced to the round of 16 of the knockout stage of the final tournament.

Round	Team	Qualification	Appearance (planned)	Previous best performance	Previous FIFA U-20 World Cup appearances
Group stage	United States (title holders)	1st ranked entrant	25th	Champions (2017, 2018)	16
Group stage	Mexico	2nd ranked entrant	27th	Champions (1962, 1970, 1973, 1974, 1976, 1978, 1980, 1984, 1990, 1992, 2011, 2013, 2015)	16
Group stage	Panama	3rd ranked entrant	12th	Runners-up (2015)	6
Group stage	Honduras (hosts)	4th ranked entrant	20th	Champions (1982, 1994)	8
Group stage	Costa Rica	5th ranked entrant	21st	Champions (1988, 2009)	9
Group stage	El Salvador	6th ranked entrant	18th	Champions (1964)	1
Group stage	Cuba	7th ranked entrant	14th	Runners-up (1970, 1974)	1
Group stage	Haiti	8th ranked entrant	10th	Second round (1978)	0
Group stage	Canada	9th ranked entrant	24th	Champions (1986, 1996)	8
Group stage	Trinidad and Tobago	10th ranked entrant	21st	Runners-up (1990)	2
Group stage	Guatemala	11th ranked entrant	20th	Runners-up (1962, 1973)	1
Group stage	Jamaica	12th ranked entrant	21st	Third place (1970)	1
Group stage	Antigua and Barbuda	13th ranked entrant	5th	First round (1980, 1986, 2017)	0
Group stage	Suriname	14th ranked entrant	7th	First round (1976, 1980, 1986, 1990, 2011, 2018)	0
Group stage	Saint Kitts and Nevis	15th ranked entrant	4th	First round (2007, 2017, 2018)	0
Group stage	Aruba	16th ranked entrant	3rd	First round (2015, 2018)	0
Knockout stage	Nicaragua	Qualifying Group A winner	10th	Second round (1976)	0
Knockout stage	Dominican Republic	Qualifying Group B winner	6th	Second round (1976)	0
Knockout stage	Guadeloupe (Note: Non-FIFA members and thus ineligible to play in World Cup.)	Qualifying Group C winner	4th	First round (1992, 2011, 2018)	0
Knockout stage	Barbados	Qualifying Group D winner	7th	First round (1976, 1980, 1984, 1986, 1990, 2018)	0

== Venues ==
2020 CONCACAF U-20 Championship is located in Honduras	San Pedro Sula	
2020 CONCACAF U-20 Championship is located in Honduras	Estadio Francisco Morazán	Estadio Olímpico Metropolitano
2020 CONCACAF U-20 Championship is located in Honduras	Capacity: 18,000	Capacity: 37,325

== Draw ==
The draw for the group stage took place on 20 November 2019, 11:00 EST (UTC−5), at the CONCACAF Headquarters in Miami. The 16 teams which entered the group stage were drawn into four groups of four teams. Based on the CONCACAF Under-20 Ranking, the 16 teams were distributed into four pots, with teams in Pot 1 assigned to each group prior to the draw, as follows:

Pot 1	Pot 2	Pot 3	Pot 4
United States (Group E); Mexico (Group F); Panama (Group G); Honduras (Group H)	Costa Rica; El Salvador; Cuba; Haiti	Canada; Trinidad and Tobago; Guatemala; Jamaica	Antigua and Barbuda; Suriname; Saint Kitts and Nevis; Aruba

== Squads ==
Players born on or after 1 January 2001 are eligible to compete.

== Group stage ==
The top three teams in each group advance to the round of 16, where they are joined by the four teams advancing from the qualifying round.

All times are local, CST (UTC−6).

=== Group A ===
Pos	Team	Pld	W	D	L	GF	GA	GD	Pts	Qualification
1	United States	0	0	0	0	0	0	0	0	Knockout stage
2	Costa Rica	0	0	0	0	0	0	0	0	Knockout stage
3	Jamaica	0	0	0	0	0	0	0	0	Knockout stage
4	Saint Kitts and Nevis	0	0	0	0	0	0	0	0	

Source: CONCACAF
Rules for classification: Group stage tiebreakers
21 June 2020

United States	Cancelled	Saint Kitts and Nevis

Estadio General Francisco Morazán, San Pedro Sula
21 June 2020

Costa Rica	Cancelled	Jamaica

Estadio General Francisco Morazán, San Pedro Sula

23 June 2020

United States	Cancelled	Jamaica

Estadio General Francisco Morazán, San Pedro Sula
23 June 2020

Costa Rica	Cancelled	Saint Kitts and Nevis

Estadio General Francisco Morazán, San Pedro Sula

25 June 2020

Jamaica	Cancelled	Saint Kitts and Nevis

Estadio General Francisco Morazán, San Pedro Sula
25 June 2020

Costa Rica	Cancelled	United States

Estadio General Francisco Morazán, San Pedro Sula

=== Group B ===
Pos	Team	Pld	W	D	L	GF	GA	GD	Pts	Qualification
1	Mexico	0	0	0	0	0	0	0	0	Knockout stage
2	El Salvador	0	0	0	0	0	0	0	0	Knockout stage
3	Canada	0	0	0	0	0	0	0	0	Knockout stage
4	Aruba	0	0	0	0	0	0	0	0	

Source: CONCACAF
Rules for classification: Group stage tiebreakers
21 June 2020

El Salvador	Cancelled	Canada

Estadio Olímpico Metropolitano, San Pedro Sula
21 June 2020

Mexico	Cancelled	Aruba

Estadio Olímpico Metropolitano, San Pedro Sula

23 June 2020

El Salvador	Cancelled	Aruba

Estadio Olímpico Metropolitano, San Pedro Sula
23 June 2020

Mexico	Cancelled	Canada

Estadio Olímpico Metropolitano, San Pedro Sula

25 June 2020

Canada	Cancelled	Aruba

Estadio Olímpico Metropolitano, San Pedro Sula
25 June 2020

El Salvador	Cancelled	Mexico

Estadio Olímpico Metropolitano, San Pedro Sula

=== Group C ===
Pos	Team	Pld	W	D	L	GF	GA	GD	Pts	Qualification
1	Panama	0	0	0	0	0	0	0	0	Knockout stage
2	Haiti	0	0	0	0	0	0	0	0	Knockout stage
3	Trinidad and Tobago	0	0	0	0	0	0	0	0	Knockout stage
4	Suriname	0	0	0	0	0	0	0	0	

Source: CONCACAF
Rules for classification: Group stage tiebreakers
20 June 2020

Panama	Cancelled	Suriname

Estadio General Francisco Morazán, San Pedro Sula
20 June 2020

Haiti	Cancelled	Trinidad and Tobago

Estadio General Francisco Morazán, San Pedro Sula

22 June 2020

Panama	Cancelled	Trinidad and Tobago

Estadio General Francisco Morazán, San Pedro Sula
22 June 2020

Haiti	Cancelled	Suriname

Estadio General Francisco Morazán, San Pedro Sula

24 June 2020

Trinidad and Tobago	Cancelled	Suriname

Estadio General Francisco Morazán, San Pedro Sula
24 June 2020

Panama	Cancelled	Haiti

Estadio General Francisco Morazán, San Pedro Sula

=== Group D ===
Pos	Team	Pld	W	D	L	GF	GA	GD	Pts	Qualification
1	Honduras (H)	0	0	0	0	0	0	0	0	Knockout stage
2	Cuba	0	0	0	0	0	0	0	0	Knockout stage
3	Guatemala	0	0	0	0	0	0	0	0	Knockout stage
4	Antigua and Barbuda	0	0	0	0	0	0	0	0	

Source: CONCACAF
Rules for classification: Group stage tiebreakers
(H) Hosts
20 June 2020

Cuba	Cancelled	Guatemala

Estadio Olímpico Metropolitano, San Pedro Sula
20 June 2020

Honduras	Cancelled	Antigua and Barbuda

Estadio Olímpico Metropolitano, San Pedro Sula

22 June 2020

Cuba	Cancelled	Antigua and Barbuda

Estadio Olímpico Metropolitano, San Pedro Sula
22 June 2020

Guatemala	Cancelled	Honduras

Estadio Olímpico Metropolitano, San Pedro Sula

24 June 2020

Antigua and Barbuda	Cancelled	Guatemala

Estadio Olímpico Metropolitano, San Pedro Sula
24 June 2020

Honduras	Cancelled	Cuba

Estadio Olímpico Metropolitano, San Pedro Sula

== Knockout stage ==
=== Bracket ===
Round of 16
28 June – Francisco Morazán
1E
Barbados
28 June – Olímpico Metropolitano
2G
3E
28 June – Francisco Morazán
1G
Dominican Republic
28 June – Olímpico Metropolitano
2E
3G
27 June – Francisco Morazán
1F
Guadeloupe
27 June – Olímpico Metropolitano
2H
3F
27 June – Francisco Morazán
1H
Nicaragua
27 June – Olímpico Metropolitano
2F
3H

Quarter-finals
30 June – Olímpico Metropolitano
W25
W28
30 June – Olímpico Metropolitano
W26
W27
30 June – Francisco Morazán
W29
W32
30 June – Francisco Morazán
W30
W31

Semi-finals
3 July – Olímpico Metropolitano
W33
W34
3 July – Olímpico Metropolitano
W35
W36

Final
5 July – Olímpico Metropolitano
W37
W38

=== Round of 16 ===
27 June 2020

1F	Cancelled	Guadeloupe

Estadio General Francisco Morazán, San Pedro Sula

27 June 2020

1H	Cancelled	Nicaragua

Estadio General Francisco Morazán, San Pedro Sula

27 June 2020

2F	Cancelled	3H

Estadio Olímpico Metropolitano, San Pedro Sula

27 June 2020

2H	Cancelled	3F

Estadio Olímpico Metropolitano, San Pedro Sula

28 June 2020

1E	Cancelled	Barbados

Estadio General Francisco Morazán, San Pedro Sula

28 June 2020

1G	Cancelled	Dominican Republic

Estadio General Francisco Morazán, San Pedro Sula

28 June 2020

2E	Cancelled	3G

Estadio Olímpico Metropolitano, San Pedro Sula

28 June 2020

2G	Cancelled	3E

Estadio Olímpico Metropolitano, San Pedro Sula

=== Quarter-finals ===
Winners would have qualified for 2021 FIFA U-20 World Cup.

30 June 2020

W25	Cancelled	W28

Estadio Olímpico Metropolitano, San Pedro Sula

30 June 2020

W26	Cancelled	W27

Estadio Olímpico Metropolitano, San Pedro Sula

30 June 2020

W29	Cancelled	W32

Estadio General Francisco Morazán, San Pedro Sula

30 June 2020

W30	Cancelled	W31

Estadio General Francisco Morazán, San Pedro Sula

=== Semi-finals ===
3 July 2020

W33	Cancelled	W34

Estadio Olímpico Metropolitano, San Pedro Sula

3 July 2020

W35	Cancelled	W36

Estadio Olímpico Metropolitano, San Pedro Sula

=== Final ===
5 July 2020

W37	Cancelled	W38

Estadio Olímpico Metropolitano, San Pedro Sula
