= 2007 U-20 World Cup CONCACAF qualifying tournament qualifying =

This article features the 2007 U-20 World Cup CONCACAF qualifying tournament qualifying stage. Caribbean and Central American teams entered in separate tournaments. The North American team the United States automatically qualified, as well as main tournament hosts Mexico (North America) and Panama (Central America). 23 Caribbean teams entered, of which 3 qualified and 6 Central American teams entered, of which 2 qualified.

== Caribbean ==
=== First round ===
Haiti, Jamaica and Trinidad and Tobago received a bye for this round.

==== Group A ====
All matches were played in the U.S. Virgin Islands.

Teams	Pld	W	D	L	GF	GA	GD	Pts
Bermuda	3	3	0	0	18	0	+18	9
Bahamas	3	1	1	1	18	5	+13	4
U.S. Virgin Islands	3	1	1	1	6	10	–4	4
British Virgin Islands	3	0	0	3	0	27	–27	0

Bermuda	2–0	Bahamas
U.S. Virgin Islands	3–0	British Virgin Islands
Bermuda	9–0	British Virgin Islands
Bahamas	3–3	U.S. Virgin Islands
British Virgin Islands	0–15	Bahamas
U.S. Virgin Islands	0–7	Bermuda

==== Group B ====
All matches were played in the Dominican Republic.

Teams	Pld	W	D	L	GF	GA	GD	Pts
Dominican Republic	3	3	0	0	15	0	+15	9
Cuba	3	2	0	1	13	1	+12	6
Cayman Islands	3	1	0	2	2	4	–2	3
Anguilla	3	0	0	3	0	25	–25	0

Cuba	11–0	Anguilla
Dominican Republic	2–0	Cayman Islands
Cayman Islands	0–2	Cuba
Anguilla	0–12	Dominican Republic
Cayman Islands	2–0	Anguilla
Dominican Republic	1–0	Cuba

==== Group C ====
All matches were played in Saint Martin.

Teams	Pld	W	D	L	GF	GA	GD	Pts
Saint Kitts and Nevis	3	3	0	0	13	1	+12	9
Antigua and Barbuda	3	1	1	1	5	6	–1	4
Saint Martin	3	0	2	1	3	11	–8	2
Dominica	3	0	1	2	4	7	–3	1

Antigua and Barbuda	4–3	Dominica
Saint Martin	1–9	Saint Kitts and Nevis
Saint Kitts and Nevis	2–0	Dominica
Antigua and Barbuda	1–1	Saint Martin
Dominica	1–1	Saint Martin
Saint Kitts and Nevis	2–0	Antigua and Barbuda

==== Group D ====
All matches were played in Saint Lucia.

Teams	Pld	W	D	L	GF	GA	GD	Pts
Saint Vincent and the Grenadines	3	3	0	0	7	2	+5	9
Grenada	3	2	0	1	4	3	+1	6
Saint Lucia	3	0	1	2	2	5	–3	1
Barbados	3	0	1	2	1	4	–3	1

Grenada	1–0	Barbados
Saint Lucia	1–2	Saint Vincent and the Grenadines
Grenada	1–3	Saint Vincent and the Grenadines
Barbados	1–1	Saint Lucia
Barbados	0–2	Saint Vincent and the Grenadines
Saint Lucia	0–2	Grenada

==== Group E ====
All matches were played in Suriname.

Teams	Pld	W	D	L	GF	GA	GD	Pts
Netherlands Antilles	3	2	0	1	5	3	+2	6
Suriname	3	2	0	1	7	3	+4	6
Guyana	3	1	1	1	5	6	–1	4
Aruba	3	0	1	2	1	5	–4	1

Netherlands Antilles	1–2	Guyana
Suriname	2–0	Aruba
Aruba	0–2	Netherlands Antilles
Suriname	4–2	Guyana
Guyana	1–1	Aruba
Suriname	1–2	Netherlands Antilles

=== Final round ===
Group winners qualified directly for the main tournament. Group runners-up played each other in a final play-off.

==== Group A ====
All matches were played in Trinidad and Tobago.

Teams	Pld	W	D	L	GF	GA	GD	Pts
Saint Kitts and Nevis	3	2	0	1	3	2	+1	6
Trinidad and Tobago	3	1	1	1	4	2	+2	4
Dominican Republic	3	1	1	1	5	4	+1	4
Saint Vincent and the Grenadines	3	1	0	2	2	6	–4	3

Saint Vincent and the Grenadines	1–0	Saint Kitts and Nevis
Trinidad and Tobago	1–1	Dominican Republic
Saint Vincent and the Grenadines	1–3	Dominican Republic
Saint Kitts and Nevis	1–0	Trinidad and Tobago
Dominican Republic	1–2	Saint Kitts and Nevis
Trinidad and Tobago	3–0	Saint Vincent and the Grenadines

==== Group B ====
All matches were played in Haiti.

Teams	Pld	W	D	L	GF	GA	GD	Pts
Haiti	3	2	1	0	16	1	+15	7
Jamaica	3	2	1	0	5	1	+4	7
Netherlands Antilles	3	1	0	2	5	8	–3	3
Bermuda	3	0	0	3	3	19	–16	0

Jamaica	2–0	Netherlands Antilles
Haiti	11–1	Bermuda
Jamaica	3–1	Bermuda
Haiti	5–0	Netherlands Antilles
Netherlands Antilles	5–1	Bermuda
Haiti	0–0	Jamaica

==== Second-place play-off ====
Team 1	Agg.	Team 2	1st leg	2nd leg
Jamaica	2–1	Trinidad and Tobago	2–0	0–1

== Central America ==
=== Group A ===
Teams	Pld	W	D	L	GF	GA	GD	Pts
Guatemala	2	2	0	0	11	1	+10	6
El Salvador	2	1	0	1	6	7	–1	3
Belize	2	0	0	2	1	10	–9	0

Guatemala	5–0	Belize
Belize	1–5	El Salvador
Guatemala	6–1	El Salvador

=== Group B ===
Teams	Pld	W	D	L	GF	GA	GD	Pts
Costa Rica	2	1	1	0	9	3	+6	4
Honduras	2	1	1	0	6	5	+1	4
Nicaragua	2	0	0	2	4	11	–7	0

Honduras	4–3	Nicaragua
Nicaragua	1–7	Costa Rica
Honduras	2–2	Costa Rica

== Qualified for Main Tournament ==
- Haiti (Caribbean winners)
- Saint Kitts and Nevis (Caribbean winners)
- Jamaica (Caribbean third place)
- Costa Rica (Central American winners)
- Guatemala (Central American winners)

== See also ==
- 2007 U-20 World Cup CONCACAF qualifying tournament
