= Dominican Republic national under-20 football team =

U-20 national association football team

Dominican Republic U-20
- Association: Federación Dominicana de Fútbol
- Confederation: CONCACAF
- Head coach: Walter Benitez
- FIFA code: DOM
First colours	Second colours

CONCACAF Under-20 Championship
- Appearances: 7 (first in 1974)
- Best result: Runners-up (2022)

FIFA U-20 World Cup
- Appearances: 1 (first in 2023)
- Best result: Group Stage (2023)

The Dominican Republic National under-20 football team is the association football team that represents the Dominican Republic at the under-20 level.

== Team history ==
=== 2022 ===
At the 2022 Concacaf Men’s Under-20 Championship held in Honduras from June 18 to July 3, 2022, the Dominican Republic U20 team clinching berths in the 2023 FIFA Men’s Under-20 World Cup in Indonesia after eliminating Jamaica with a 1–0 win in the quarterfinal. It was the first time any Dominican Republic team qualified for a FIFA World Cup at any age level or gender. In the semifinal match, the Dominican team defeated Guatemala 4–2 in a penalty shootout after a 2–2 draw, securing a spot in the 2024 Summer Olympic games in Paris. In the final match, the Dominican Republic lost 6–0 against the United States. The Dominican players became Concacaf Runners-up.

=== 2023 ===
The Dominican Under-20 Soccer Team settled on April 16 in Jerez, Spain, where they participated in the "Road to Youth World Cup" competition where they played three friendly matches against the U-20 teams of Brazil, Iraq and Uzbekistan as part of the final phase of their preparation for the 2023 FIFA U-20 World Cup.

The Dominican Under-20 National Team participated in its first U-20 World Cup in 2023, a tournament that was held in Argentina. It would be placed in Group D along with historical teams such as Italy, Brazil and Nigeria. The Dominican Republic would have his debut on May 21 against Nigeria in the city of Mendoza, he would start winning with a goal of Edison Azcona at minute 21, later the African team would come back from the game ending this with a score of 2–1, despite the defeat the performance of the Dominican team was acceptable being a rookie team in the tournament and also considered as the weak team of the group. Their second commitment would be against the five-time world champion of the category, Brazil, in this match the superiority of the South American team would be notorious, defeating the Dominican team by a score of 6-0. This result forced the Dominican Republic to win on the last group date against Italy and wait for other results to qualify as one of the best third parties. However, the Dominican team succumbed to the Europeans and would be defeated 3–0, being eliminated in the first round in their first World Cup experience.

== Competitive record ==
=== CONCACAF U-20 Championship ===
CONCACAF U-20 Championship record
Year	Result	Position	Pld	W	D	L	GF	GA
(Panama) 1962	Did not enter							
(Guatemala) 1964	Did not enter							
(Cuba) 1970	Did not enter							
(Mexico) 1973	Did not enter							
(Canada) 1974	Group stage	11th of 12	3	0	0	3	1	8
(Puerto Rico) 1976	Second round	7th of 15	6	1	0	5	7	31
(Honduras) 1978	First round	11th of 13	2	0	0	2	0	14
(United States) 1980	Group stage	14th of 18	3	1	0	2	2	6
(Guatemala) 1982	Did not enter							
(Trinidad and Tobago) 1984	Did not enter							
(Trinidad and Tobago) 1986	Did not qualify							
(Guatemala) 1988	Did not qualify							
(Guatemala) 1990	Did not qualify							
(Canada) 1992	Did not qualify							
(Honduras) 1994	Did not qualify							
(Mexico) 1996	Did not qualify							
(Guatemala) (Trinidad and Tobago) 1998	Did not qualify							
(Canada) (Trinidad and Tobago) 2001	Did not qualify							
(Panama) (United States) 2003	Did not qualify							
(Honduras) (United States) 2005	Did not qualify							
(Mexico) (Panama) 2007	Did not qualify							
(Trinidad and Tobago) 2009	Did not qualify							
(Guatemala) 2011	Did not qualify							
(Mexico) 2013	Did not qualify							
(Jamaica) 2015	Did not qualify							
(Costa Rica) 2017	Did not qualify							
(United States) 2018	Group stage	9th of 34	5	3	0	2	23	10
(Honduras) 2020	Cancelled							
(Honduras) 2022	Runners-up	2nd of 20	4	2	1	1	8	6
(Mexico) 2024	Group stage	10th of 12	3	0	0	3	2	7
Total	Runners-up	7/29	26	7	1	18	43	82

=== FIFA U-20 World Cup ===
FIFA U-20 World Cup record
Year	Round	Position	GP	W	D	L	GF	GA
(Tunisia) 1977	Did not qualify							
(Japan) 1979	Did not qualify							
(Australia) 1981	Did not qualify							
(Mexico) 1983	Did not qualify							
(Soviet Union) 1985	Did not qualify							
(Chile) 1987	Did not qualify							
(Saudi Arabia) 1989	Did not qualify							
(Portugal) 1991	Did not qualify							
(Australia) 1993	Did not qualify							
(Qatar) 1995	Did not qualify							
(Malaysia) 1997	Did not qualify							
(Nigeria) 1999	Did not qualify							
(Argentina) 2001	Did not qualify							
(United Arab Emirates) 2003	Did not qualify							
(Netherlands) 2005	Did not qualify							
(Canada) 2007	Did not qualify							
(Egypt) 2009	Did not qualify							
(Colombia) 2011	Did not qualify							
(Turkey) 2013	Did not qualify							
(New Zealand) 2015	Did not qualify							
(South Korea) 2017	Did not qualify							
(Poland) 2019	Did not qualify							
(Indonesia) ~~2021~~	Cancelled due to the COVID-19 pandemic							
(Argentina) 2023	Group stage	23rd	3	0	0	3	1	11
(Chile) 2025	Did not qualify							
(Azerbaijan) (Uzbekistan) 2027	Did not qualify							
(Armenia) (Georgia (country)) 2029	To be determined							
Total	Group stage	1/25	3	0	0	3	1	11

== Fixtures and recent results ==
The following is a list of match results from the previous 12 months, as well as any future matches that have been scheduled.

Win Draw Loss

== Current squad ==
The following players were named in the squad for the 2023 FIFA U-20 World Cup, to be played in May 2023.

Caps and goals correct as of 22 April 2023, after the match against Iraq.

No.	Pos.	Player	Date of birth (age)	Caps	Goals	Club
	GK	Omry Bello	28 May 2003 (age 23)	12	0	(Dominican Football Federation) O&M
	GK	Xavier Valdez	23 November 2003 (age 22)	4	0	(United States Soccer Federation) Houston Dynamo
	GK	Enrique Bösl	7 February 2004 (age 22)	1	0	(German Football Association) FC Ingolstadt
	DF	Kleffer Martes	13 January 2003 (age 23)	12	1	(Dominican Football Federation) Atlético Pantoja
	DF	Sebastián Mañón	13 February 2003 (age 23)	12	0	(United States Soccer Federation) Dartmouth Big Green
	DF	Alfeni Tamárez	14 June 2005 (age 21)	11	1	(Dominican Football Federation) Atlético Pantoja
	DF	Guillermo de Peña	22 July 2003 (age 23)	8	1	(Dominican Football Federation) Moca
	DF	Israel Boatwright	2 June 2005 (age 21)	6	2	(United States Soccer Federation) Inter Miami
	DF	Alex Ciriaco	21 March 2004 (age 22)	2	0	(Football Association of Finland) Ilves
	MF	Yordy Álvarez	3 December 2005 (age 20)	12	1	(Dominican Football Federation) Atlántico
	MF	Jason Yambatis	21 March 2003 (age 23)	7	3	(Dominican Football Federation) Atlético Pantoja
	MF	Steven Martínez	10 September 2003 (age 23)	7	1	(Dominican Football Federation) Atlético Vega Real
	MF	Miguel Vásquez	26 February 2004 (age 22)	3	0	(Dominican Football Federation) Atlántico
	FW	Anyelo Gómez	2 January 2003 (age 23)	12	1	(Dominican Football Federation) Jarabacoa
	FW	Bryan More	29 May 2003 (age 23)	11	2	(Dominican Football Federation) Atlético Vega Real
	FW	Edison Azcona	21 November 2003 (age 22)	9	4	(United States Soccer Federation) Inter Miami
	FW	Derek Cuevas	7 January 2004 (age 22)	2	1	(Royal Spanish Football Federation) Barcelona
	FW	Yunior Peralta	2 February 2004 (age 22)	1	0	(Dominican Football Federation) Cibao
	FW	Oliver Schmidhauser	2 June 2004 (age 22)	1	0	(German Football Association) RB Leipzig
	FW	Alejandro Martín Sapeg	16 February 2006 (age 20)	0	0	(Royal Spanish Football Federation) Rayo Ciudad Alcobendas

== Recent call-ups ==
The following players have previously been called up to the Dominican Republic under-20 squad in the last 12 months and remain eligible. Some of the following players were named in the squad for the 2023 FIFA U-20 World Cup to go as sparring

Pos.	Player	Date of birth (age)	Caps	Goals	Club	Latest call-up
DF	Charbel Wehbe	8 May 2004 (age 22)	4	0	(Spain) Real Oviedo	2022 CONCACAF U-20 Championship
DF	Thomas Jungbauer	30 July 2005 (age 21)	7	0	(Italy) SPAL	2022 CONCACAF U-20 Championship
MF	Fabian Messina	16 September 2002 (age 24)	2	0	(Germany) FSV Frankfurt	Friendly International
MF	Annier Rojas	16 October 2003 (age 23)	1	0	(Dominican Republic) Atlético Pantoja	2022 CONCACAF U-20 Championship
MF	Alejandro Martinez	2 June 2004 (age 22)	3	1	(Dominican Republic) Delfines del Este FC	2022 CONCACAF U-20 Championship
FW	Diefri Sandy	21 June 2004 (age 22)	6	3	(Bolivia) Royal Pari	2022 CONCACAF U-20 Championship
FW	Adhonys Vargas	12 February 2004 (age 22)	4	1	(Dominican Republic) Atlético Vega Real	2022 CONCACAF U-20 Championship
FW	Luis Francisco	26 March 2004 (age 22)	4	0	(Dominican Republic) Delfines del Este FC	2022 CONCACAF U-20 Championship

== See also ==
- Dominican Republic national football team
- Dominican Republic national under-23 football team
