= Puerto Rico national under-20 football team =

Association football team from Puerto Rico

Puerto Rico U20
- Nickname(s): El Huracán Azul (The Blue Hurricane); Los Boricuas (The Boricuas)
- Association: Federación Puertorriqueña de Fútbol (FPF)
- Confederation: CONCACAF (North America)
- Sub-confederation: CFU (Caribbean)
- Head coach: Dave Sarachan
- Captain: Jan Mateo
- Top scorer: Reid Strain
- Home stadium: Estadio Juan Ramón Loubriel
- FIFA code: PUR
First colors	Second colors

First international
- Mexico 16–0 Puerto Rico (Ottawa, Canada; August 20, 1974)

Biggest win
- Puerto Rico 9–0 Sint Maarten (Philipsburg, Sint Maarten; June 15, 2016)

Biggest defeat
- Mexico 16–0 Puerto Rico (Ottawa, Canada; August 20, 1974)

CONCACAF Under-20 Championship
- Appearances: 8 (first in 1974)
- Best result: Round of 16 (2022)

The Puerto Rico national under-20 football team represents Puerto Rico in tournaments at the under-20 level. The team is controlled by the Puerto Rican Football Federation.

== History ==
Puerto Rico made its first appearance on the 1974 CONCACAF Championship, losing all of their matches. They didn't record a win until 1976 against Barbados. It wasn't until 2012 where they had their most successful campaign under coach Jeaustin Campos where they advance through all of the Caribbean qualification and made it to the CONCACAF Championship in Puebla, México.

In 2021, Puerto Rico booked their place on the 2022 CONCACAF U-20 Championship for their second time in history, this time under coach Dave Sarachan after advancing as group leaders defeating Bermuda 6–0 on final matchday.

== Tournament results ==
=== U–20 CONCACAF Championship ===
- 1962 – 1973 – Did not enter
- 1974 – Group stage
- 1976 – First round
- 1978 – First round
- 1980 – Disqualified
- 1982 – First round
- 1984 – First round
- 1986 – 1990 – Did not enter
- 1992 – Did not qualify
- 1994 – 2001 – Did not enter
- 2003 – Did not qualify
- 2003 – Did not qualify
- 2005 – Did not enter
- 2007 – Did not enter
- 2009 – Did not qualify
- 2011 – Did not qualify
- 2013 – First round
- 2015 – Did not enter
- 2017 – Did not qualify
- 2018 – First round
- 2020 – Cancelled
- 2022 – Round of 16
- 2024 – Did not qualify
- 2026 – Did not qualify

== Schedule and results ==
The following is a list of match results in the last 12 months, as well as any future matches that have been scheduled.

Legend

Win Draw Loss Cancelled Fixture

== Players ==
=== Current squad ===
- The following players were called up for the 2024 CONCACAF U-20 Championship.
- Match dates: 23 February and 2 March 2024

No.	Pos.	Player	Date of birth (age)	Caps	Goals	Club
	GK	Jean Luc Fontana	12 October 2005 (age 21)	2	0	(Royal Spanish Football Federation) Granada
	GK	Franco Ramos	10 June 2006 (age 20)	1	0	Unknown
	GK	Sebastián Cuevas	23 May 2006 (age 20)	0	0	(Royal Spanish Football Federation) Salamanca
	DF	Juan Torres	2 October 2006 (age 20)	3	0	(United States Soccer Federation) Solar SC
	DF	José López	25 May 2002 (age 24)	2	0	(Puerto Rican Football Federation) Bayamón
	DF	André Casas	1 January 2005 (age 21)	0	0	(United States Soccer Federation) Stetson Hatters
	DF	Marcos Villanueva	29 March 2006 (age 20)	2	0	(United States Soccer Federation) Albany Great Danes
	DF	Eitan Solomiany	8 December 2006 (age 19)	2	0	(Puerto Rican Football Federation) Academia Quintana
	DF	Adrian Rosario	12 April 2007 (age 19)	2	0	(United States Soccer Federation) Inter Miami II
	MF	Benjamín Donato	July 5, 2005 (age 21)	6	1	(United States Soccer Federation) Stetson University
	MF	Adrián Biaggi	April 13, 2005 (age 21)	6	1	(United States Soccer Federation) University of Illinois Chicago
	MF	Justin Blanco	19 February 2007 (age 19)	2	0	(United States Soccer Federation) FC Cincinnati 2
	MF	Brayden Barnett	13 August 2006 (age 20)	2	0	(United States Soccer Federation) Southern Soccer Academy
	MF	Luis Medina	22 August 2005 (age 21)	3	1	(Portuguese Football Federation) Belenenses
	MF	Fabián Menéndez	2 July 2005 (age 21)	4	1	(United States Soccer Federation) Wofford Terriers
	MF	Sebastián Otero	15 September 2005 (age 21)	3	1	(United States Soccer Federation) Boston Terriers
	FW	Cristian Ortiz.	15 November 2005 (age 21)	2	0	(United States Soccer Federation) Inter Miami II
	FW	Jorge Rodríguez	{{{age}}}	1	0	(United States Soccer Federation) Bryant Bulldogs
	FW	Cedric Rodríguez	5 September 2006 (age 20)	2	0	(Royal Spanish Football Federation) Séneca CF
	FW	Izaiah Garza	22 August 2006 (age 20)	2	0	(United States Soccer Federation) St. Edward's Hilltoppers
	FW	Daniel Cruz	14 May 2005 (age 21)	5	3	Unknown

== See also ==
- Puerto Rico national football team
