= Canada men's national under-20 soccer team =

Canada Under-20
- Nickname(s): The Canucks; Les Rouges (The Reds)
- Association: Canadian Soccer Association
- Confederation: CONCACAF (North America)
- Head coach: Andrew Olivieri
- Most caps: David Edgar (27)
- Top scorer: Iain Hume (7)
- FIFA code: CAN
First colours	Second colours

First international
- Nicaragua 1–1 Canada (Puebla, Mexico; February 20, 1973)

Biggest win
- Canada 9–0 Dominican Republic (Tegucigalpa, Honduras; November 26, 1978)

Biggest defeat
- United States 5–0 Canada (Sunrise, Florida, United States; December 18, 2010); Cameroon 5–0 Canada (Niamey, Niger; December 6, 2005); Niger 6–1 Canada (Niamey, Niger; December 8, 2005)

FIFA U-20 World Cup
- Appearances: 8 (first in 1979)
- Best result: Quarter-finals (2003)

CONCACAF Under-20 Championship
- Appearances: 26 (first in 1973)
- Best result: Champions (1986, 1996)
Medal record
CONCACAF Under-20 Championship
Gold medal – first place	1986 Trinidad and Tobago
Gold medal – first place	1996 Mexico
Silver medal – second place	1978 Honduras
Silver medal – second place	1984 Trinidad and Tobago
Bronze medal – third place	1992 Canada
Bronze medal – third place	1994 Honduras
Jeux de la Francophonie
Gold medal – first place	1989 Casablanca/Rabat
Gold medal – first place	1997 Antananarivo

The Canada U-20 men's national soccer team (also known as Canada Under-20s or Canada U-20s) represents Canada in international soccer at this age level. They are overseen by the Canadian Soccer Association, the governing body for soccer in Canada.

It plays a large role in the development of Canadian soccer, and is considered to be the feeder team for the Canada men's national soccer team. The team has qualified for eight out of nineteen FIFA U-20 World Cups. Their best result came in 2003 where they reached the quarterfinals. The team also competes in the CONCACAF U-20 Championship, which they won in 1986 and 1996.

Canada's most significant accomplishments at youth level are winning the CONCACAF U-20 Championship and Francophone Games twice, reaching quarterfinals of the 2003 FIFA U-20 World Cup, and defeating Brazil U-20 2–1 in a friendly on May 19, 2006, at Commonwealth Stadium in Edmonton, Alberta.

== History ==
=== 1976–1996 ===
Canada's first under-20 soccer squad was created in 1976 as Canada's response to the newly created world youth championship. The team failed to qualify for the inaugural tournament in 1977 in Tunisia, but they qualified for the following tournament two years later in Japan. They finished last in their group with two points, but they did manage to defeat Portugal 3–1. The next time the team qualified for a World youth Championship was in 1985, in the USSR, again they came last in their group with only one point. In the 1987 WYC in Chile, Canada's under-20 soccer team put up a good effort scoring four goals, and tying Italy, however they still did not manage to get out of the group stage.

According to Canada Soccer's record book, many of the squads from this era were actually classified as under-19 at the time.

=== 1997–2004 ===
In 1997, after failing to qualify for four World Youth Championships (as the event was known until 2005) in a row, Canada made it past the group stage. The team progressed to the second round after a 2–1 win against Hungary in which a young Dwayne De Rosario scored a goal. They lost the round of 16 game against Spain 2–0. After missing the tournament in 1999, Canada qualified for Argentina 2001 after winning the qualifying tournament based on home soil in Vancouver, British Columbia. At the finals, they finished last and were eliminated from a group including Brazil, Germany and Iraq.

Canada once again appeared in the 2003 FIFA World Youth Championship in United Arab Emirates. They qualified to the round of 16 where they blanked Burkina Faso 1–0, and in a rematch against 1997 conquerors Spain, Canada lost in the quarter-finals. Iain Hume scored three goals for Canada including a direct free kick against Spain while Atiba Hutchinson was an impressive performer in midfield.

=== 2005–present ===
At the 2005 FIFA World Youth Championships in the Netherlands, Canada were eliminated in the group stage after tying once and losing twice. One bright side of the tournament was Jaime Peters' and Marcel De Jong's goals.

In the build-up to the 2007 FIFA U-20 World Cup, as the tournament came to be known, Canada's defeated Brazil in the first game of a three-game series, winning 2- in front of 14 000+ at Commonwealth Stadium in Edmonton on May 19, 2006. David Edgar and Will Johnson scored and Stephen Lumley made goal-line clearance to preserve Canada's first win over a Brazilian men's team at any level. Canada lost the remaining two matches 3–1. Despite an impressive run in friendlies leading up to the competition, Canada went winless in first round play without scoring a goal on home soil.

== Results and fixtures ==
The following is a list of match results in the last twelve months, as well as any future matches that have been scheduled.

Win Draw Loss Fixture

=== 2025 ===
December 18 Friendly	Costa Rica	0–0	Canada	Alajuela, Costa Rica
		Report		Stadium: FCRF-Plycem Complex

December 21 Friendly	Costa Rica	0–0	Canada	Alajuela, Costa Rica
4:00PM EST		Report		Stadium: FCRF-Plycem Complex

=== 2026 ===
February 26 Concacaf U-20 Qualifiers Group F	U.S. Virgin Islands	0–14	Canada	Managua, Nicaragua
5:00PM EST		Report	Graham-Roache 4', 31', 53'; Bruno 6', 45+4'; Bibishkov 11', 42', 80', 88'; Sadek 25'; Jimoh 33'; Mackenzie 45+1'; Evans 69', 75'	Stadium: Estadio Miguel Chocorrón Buitrago

February 28 Concacaf U-20 Qualifiers Group F	Canada	8–0	Martinique	Managua, Nicaragua
8:00PM EST	Mackenzie 5'; Evans 9', 12', 35'; Graham-Roache 38'; Bibishkov 65', 80'; Bossenberry 90+1'	Report		Stadium: Estadio Miguel Chocorrón Buitrago

March 2 Concacaf U-20 Qualifiers Group F	Aruba	0–2	Canada	Managua, Nicaragua
8:00PM EST		Report	Graham-Roache 89'; Judelson 90+6'	Stadium: Estadio Miguel Chocorrón Buitrago

March 4 Concacaf U-20 Qualifiers Group F	Canada	0–1	Nicaragua	Managua, Nicaragua
8:00PM EST		Report	Avilés 37'	Stadium: Estadio Miguel Chocorrón Buitrago

June 1 Maurice Revello Tournament Group B	Canada	2–0	Venezuela	Avignon, France
12:30PM EST	Guboglo 20'; Evans 43'	Report		Stadium: Parc des Sports; Referee: Florian Exner (Germany)

June 6 Maurice Revello Tournament Group B	Japan	1–0	Canada	Avignon, France
9:00AM EST	Yamashita 89'	Report		Stadium: Parc des Sports; Referee: Natálie Čampišová (Czech Republic)

June 8 Maurice Revello Tournament Group B	Canada	1–2	Ivory Coast	Aubagne, France
9:00AM EST	Graham-Roache 72'	Report	Ta Bi 14', 79'	Stadium: Stade de Lattre-de-Tassigny; Referee: Bert Verbeke (Belgium)

June 11 Maurice Revello Tournament Group B	Portugal	6–1	Canada	Toulon, France
13:30	Rego 9', 13' De Carvalho 12' Couto 55' Andrade 58', 75'	Report	Kozlovskiy 51'	Stadium: Stade Bon Rencontre; Referee: Maika Vanderstichel (France)

July 26 2026 CONCACAF U-20 Championship - Group C	Canada	3–0	Panama	Puebla
16:00 EST	Fotsing 9', 90+5'; Mackenzie 14'	Report		Stadium: Estadio Universitario BUAP

July 29 2026 CONCACAF U-20 Championship - Group C	Honduras	1–1	Canada	Puebla
19:00	Martinez 64'	Report	Lima 57'	Stadium: Estadio Universitario BUAP; Referee: Shavin Greene (Guyana)

August 1 2026 CONCACAF U-20 Championship - Group C	Canada	2–2	Jamaica	Puebla
14:00	Sedin 56'; Aiyenero 79'	Report	Nolan 21'; Leighton 90+12'	Stadium: Estadio Universitario BUAP; Referee: Guido Gonzales Jr. (USA)

August 5 2026 CONCACAF U-20 Championship - QF	Canada	3–1 (a.e.t.)	Jamaica	Puebla
16:30 UTC-6	Mackenzie 57', 94' (pen.); Vogele 116'	Report	Nolan 87' (pen.)	Stadium: Estadio Cuauhtémoc; Referee: Ismael Rosario López Peñuelas (Mexico)

August 7 2026 CONCACAF U-20 Championship - SF	Mexico	2–1	Canada	Mexico City
21:00 UTC-6 (Note: The Canada v Mexico match, originally scheduled for 20:00, was delayed to 21:00 due thunderstorms in the area.)	Alfaro 49'; Camberos 78' (pen.)	Report	Graham-Roache 6'	Stadium: Estadio Banorte; Referee: Cristhofer Corado (Guatemala)

== Coaching history ==
Andrew Olivieri is the current head coach of the U20 Canadian national team

Name	Years
Alan Ross	1973
Barrie Clarke	1979–80
Bob Bearpark	1985–94
Bruce Twamley	1994–97
Paul James	1998–2001
Stephen Hart	2002
Dale Mitchell	2002–07
Tony Fonseca	2007–10
Valerio Gazzola	2010–11
Nick Dasovic	2011–13
Rob Gale	2014–18
Andrew Olivieri	2018–22
Mauro Biello	2022–23
Andrew Olivieri	2023–present

== Players ==
=== Current U20 squad ===
Canada Soccer has announced its 21-player squad for the 2026 CONCACAF U-20 Championship. The tournament runs from 24 July to 9 August in Mexico. Canada was drawn into Group C alongside Honduras, Panama, and Jamaica. The team opens play against Panama on Saturday, 25 July. This will be followed by a match against Honduras on Tuesday, 29 July, and Jamaica on August 1st.

Caps and goals as of August 8, 2026, after the match against Mexico.

No.	Pos.	Player	Date of birth (age)	Caps	Goals	Club
1	GK	Nathaniel Abraham	April 23, 2007 (age 19)	8	0	(United States Soccer Federation) University of Louisville
12	GK	Jonathan Ransom	January 8, 2008 (age 18)	2	0	(United States Soccer Federation) Atlanta United 2
21	GK	Izan Server	February 2, 2007 (age 19)	3	0	(Royal Spanish Football Federation) Celta Vigo U19
3	DF	Clovis Archange	July 1, 2008 (age 18)	9	0	(United States Soccer Federation) Orlando City SC
5	DF	Anyole Peter	June 18, 2007 (age 19)	8	0	(Canadian Soccer Association) Whitecaps FC Academy
6	DF	Félix Samson	October 26, 2007 (age 19)	9	0	(United States Soccer Federation) FC Cincinnati 2
13	DF	**Richard Chukwu**	February 25, 2008 (age 18)	8	0	(Canadian Soccer Association) Toronto FC
15	DF	Max Vogele	March 27, 2007 (age 19)	13	1	(Swedish Football Association) IFK Stocksund
16	DF	Sergei Kozlovskiy	June 18, 2008 (age 18)	14	3	(Canadian Soccer Association) Atlético Ottawa
4	MF	Dylan Judelson	June 5, 2008 (age 18)	13	1	(Italian Football Federation) Genoa U20
8	MF	Emrick Fotsing	September 27, 2007 (age 19)	4	2	(Canadian Soccer Association) Vancouver FC
10	MF	Liam Mackenzie	March 15, 2007 (age 19)	13	5	(Canadian Soccer Association) HFX Wanderers
14	MF	Timothy Fortier	December 22, 2008 (age 17)	12	0	(Canadian Soccer Association) Toronto FC Academy
17	MF	Zayne Bruno	January 23, 2007 (age 19)	9	2	(Canadian Soccer Association) Forge FC
18	MF	Valter Sedin	February 28, 2007 (age 19)	7	1	(Canadian Soccer Association) Whitecaps FC 2
20	MF	Antone Bossenberry	August 14, 2008 (age 18)	5	1	(Canadian Soccer Association) Toronto FC II
7	FW	Marsel Bibishkov	April 11, 2007 (age 19)	10	6	(Canadian Soccer Association) Vancouver FC
9	FW	Owen Graham-Roache	February 8, 2008 (age 18)	12	8	(Canadian Soccer Association) Cavalry FC
11	FW	Lucas Lima	April 27, 2007 (age 19)	10	1	(Portuguese Football Federation) Chaves U19
19	FW	Marius Aiyenero	May 23, 2008 (age 18)	9	1	(United States Soccer Federation) Los Angeles FC 2
ALT = Alternate player; Players in **bold** have been already capped with the senior team.

=== Recent U20 call-ups ===
The following players have previously been called up to the U-20 team, and are still eligible to play for Canada in the current U-20 World Cup cycle if they qualify.

Pos.	Player	Date of birth (age)	Caps	Goals	Club	Latest call-up
GK	James Rhodes	November 5, 2007 (age 19)	3	0	(Poland) ŁKS Łódź	2026 CONCACAF Championship qualif.
GK	Emmanuel Marmolejo	June 14, 2007 (age 19)	0	0	(United States) Georgetown Hoyas	2026 CONCACAF Championship qualif.
DF	Kilian Michelbach	September 19, 2007 (age 19)	8	0	(Germany) SC Freiburg II	2026 Maurice Revello Tournament
DF	Sahil Deo	April 7, 2008 (age 18)	8	0	(Canada) Whitecaps FC 2	2026 Maurice Revello Tournament
DF	Josh-Duc Nteziryayo	November 15, 2008 (age 18)	2	0	(Canada) CF Montréal	v. Costa Rica, December 21, 2025
DF	Omar Robbana	September 13, 2007 (age 19)	1	0	(United States) South Carolina Gamecocks	v. Costa Rica, December 21, 2025
MF	Jesse Saputo^{INJ}	July 9, 2007 (age 19)	3	0	(Italy) Bologna U20	2026 CONCACAF Championship
MF	Elijah Roche	June 28, 2008 (age 18)	2	0	(Austria) Sturm Graz II	2026 Maurice Revello Tournament
MF	Aghilas Sadek	July 15, 2008 (age 18)	2	1	(Canada) Forge FC	2026 CONCACAF Championship qualif.
MF	James McGlinchey	May 18, 2007 (age 19)	1	0	(Canada) Cavalry FC	2026 CONCACAF Championship qualif.
MF	George Booth	July 2, 2008 (age 18)	2	0	(England) Reading FC U21	2026 CONCACAF Championship qualif.
MF	**Kevin Khan**	May 30, 2008 (age 18)	2	0	(Netherlands) Feyenoord U21	2026 CONCACAF Championship qualif.
FW	Aleksandr Guboglo^{WD}	March 7, 2007 (age 19)	6	1	(France) Reims II	2026 CONCACAF Championship
FW	Shola Jimoh^{INJ}	April 8, 2008 (age 18)	8	1	(Canada) Inter Toronto FC	2026 CONCACAF Championship
FW	Antoni Klukowski	April 2, 2007 (age 19)	4	0	(Poland) Widzew Łódź	2026 Maurice Revello Tournament
FW	Aidan Evans	November 1, 2008 (age 18)	6	5	(England) Fulham U18	2026 Maurice Revello Tournament
FW	André Ali-Gayapersad	January 5, 2008 (age 18)	2	0	(Spain) CF Damm Youth	2026 Maurice Revello Tournament
FW	Joshua Nugent	June 5, 2007 (age 19)	2	0	(Canada) Toronto FC II	2026 CONCACAF Championship qualif.
FW	Van Parker	January 29, 2009 (age 17)	0	0	(United States) Real Salt Lake	v. Costa Rica, December 21, 2025
ALT = Alternate player; INJ = Injured player; PRE = Preliminary squad; WD = Withdrew for non-injury reason; Players in **bold** have been already capped with the senior team.

=== Previous squads ===
FIFA U-20 World Cup

- 1979 FIFA U-20 World Cup squad
- 1985 FIFA U-20 World Cup squad
- 1987 FIFA U-20 World Cup squad
- 1997 FIFA U-20 World Cup squad
- 2001 FIFA U-20 World Cup squad
- 2003 FIFA U-20 World Cup squad
- 2005 FIFA U-20 World Cup squad
- 2007 FIFA U-20 World Cup squad

CONCACAF U-20 Championship

- 2001 CONCACAF U-20 Championship squad
- 2003 CONCACAF U-20 Championship squad
- 2005 CONCACAF U-20 Championship squad
- 2009 CONCACAF U-20 Championship squad
- 2011 CONCACAF U-20 Championship squad
- 2013 CONCACAF U-20 Championship squad
- 2015 CONCACAF U-20 Championship squad
- 2017 CONCACAF U-20 Championship squad
- 2018 CONCACAF U-20 Championship squad
- 2022 CONCACAF U-20 Championship squad
- 2024 CONCACAF U-20 Championship squad
- 2026 CONCACAF U-20 Championship squad

Jeux de la Francophonie

- 2001 Jeux de la Francophonie squad
- 2013 Jeux de la Francophonie squad

== Competitive record ==
Champions Runners-up Third place Tournament played fully or partially on home soil

=== FIFA U-20 World Cup ===
FIFA U-20 World Cup record
Year	Result	Position	Pld	W	D	L	GF	GA
(Tunisia) 1977	Did not qualify							
(Japan) 1979	Group stage	13th of 16	3	1	0	2	3	5
(Australia) 1981	Did not qualify							
(Mexico) 1983	Did not qualify							
(Soviet Union) 1985	Group stage	14th of 16	3	0	1	2	0	7
(Chile) 1987	Group stage	12th of 16	3	0	2	1	4	5
(Saudi Arabia) 1989	Did not qualify							
(Portugal) 1991	Did not qualify							
(Australia) 1993	Did not qualify							
(Qatar) 1995	Did not qualify							
(Malaysia) 1997	Round of 16	13th of 24	4	1	1	2	3	5
(Nigeria) 1999	Did not qualify							
(Argentina) 2001	Group stage	24th of 24	3	0	0	3	0	9
(United Arab Emirates) 2003	Quarter-finals	8th of 24	5	2	0	3	4	6
(Netherlands) 2005	Group stage	21st of 24	3	0	1	2	2	7
(Canada) 2007	Group stage	24th of 24	3	0	0	3	0	6
(Egypt) 2009	Did not qualify							
(Colombia) 2011	Did not qualify							
(Turkey) 2013	Did not qualify							
(New Zealand) 2015	Did not qualify							
(South Korea) 2017	Did not qualify							
(Poland) 2019	Did not qualify							
(Indonesia) 2021	Cancelled							
(Argentina) 2023	Did not qualify							
(Chile) 2025	Did not qualify							
(Azerbaijan) (Uzbekistan) 2027	Qualified							
(Armenia) (Georgia (country)) 2029	To be determined							
Total	Quarter-finals	9/26	27	4	5	18	16	50

=== CONCACAF U-20 Championship ===
CONCACAF U-20 Championship record
Year	Result	Position	Pld	W	D	L	GF	GA
(Panama) 1962	Did not enter							
(Guatemala) 1964	Did not enter							
(Cuba) 1970	Did not enter							
(Mexico) 1973	Fourth place	4th of 6	4	0	1	3	2	6
(Canada) 1974	Quarter-finals	4th of 12	4	3	1	0	13	4
(Puerto Rico) 1976	Second round	5th of 15	6	2	1	3	14	13
(Honduras) 1978	Runner-up	2nd of 13	7	3	1	3	16	4
(United States) 1980	Semi-finals	3rd of 18	5	2	3	0	6	2
(Guatemala) 1982	Second round	5th of 12	5	2	1	2	10	8
(Trinidad and Tobago) 1984	Runner-up	2nd of 16	8	4	3	1	13	4
(Trinidad and Tobago) 1986	Champions	1st of 10	7	6	1	0	23	2
(Guatemala) 1988	Group stage	6th of 10	4	1	1	2	4	4
(Guatemala) 1990	Group stage	5th of 12	2	1	1	0	1	0
(Canada) 1992	Third place	3rd of 11	5	3	1	1	12	6
(Honduras) 1994	Third place	3rd of 12	6	3	0	3	18	10
(Mexico) 1996	Champions	1st of 12	5	4	1	0	10	2
(Guatemala) (Trinidad and Tobago) 1998	Group stage	6th of 8	3	1	0	2	4	7
(Canada) (Trinidad and Tobago) 2001	Group stage	3rd of 8	3	2	1	0	2	0
(Panama) (United States) 2003	Group stage	2nd of 8	3	2	1	0	5	2
(United States) (Honduras) 2005	Group stage	2nd of 8	3	3	0	0	4	1
(Panama) (Mexico) 2007	Did not enter							
(Trinidad and Tobago) 2009	Group stage	5th of 8	3	1	0	2	3	3
(Guatemala) 2011	Quarter-finals	7th of 12	3	1	0	2	2	7
(Mexico) 2013	Quarter-finals	6th of 12	3	1	0	2	8	7
(Jamaica) 2015	Group stage	9th of 12	5	1	0	4	8	11
(Costa Rica) 2017	Group stage	9th of 12	3	1	0	2	2	6
(United States) 2018	Group stage	–	5	3	0	2	10	6
(Honduras) 2020	Cancelled							
(Honduras) 2022	Round of 16	11th of 20	4	1	2	1	7	4
(Mexico) 2024	Quarter-finals	6th of 12	4	2	1	1	6	5
(Mexico) 2026	Semi-finals	3rd of 12	5	2	2	1	10	6
Total	2 Titles	25/30	115	55	23	37	213	130

=== Jeux de la Francophonie ===
Jeux de la Francophonie record
Year	Result	Position	Pld	W	D	L	GF	GA
(Morocco) 1989	Gold medal	1st of 10	4	3	1	0	9	3
(France) 1994	Group stage	5th of 9	2	1	0	1	6	5
(Madagascar) 1997	Gold medal	1st of 10	5	2	2	1	3	2
(Canada) 2001	Quarter-finals	6th of 12	4	1	1	2	4	7
(Niger) 2005	Group stage	12th of 12	3	0	0	3	1	13
(Lebanon) 2009	Fourth place	4th of 9	4	1	1	2	4	9
(France) 2013	Group stage	10th of 14	3	1	0	2	3	7
(Ivory Coast) 2017	Group stage	7th of 16	3	2	0	1	3	4
(Democratic Republic of the Congo) 2023	Group stage	Withdrew						
Total	2 Titles	8/9	28	11	5	12	33	50

== Head-to-head record ==
The following table shows Canada's head-to-head record in the FIFA U-20 World Cup.

Opponent	Pld	W	D	L	GF	GA	GD	Win %
Argentina	1	0	0	1	1	2	−1	0.00
Australia	3	0	2	1	1	2	−1	0.00
Austria	1	0	0	1	0	1	−1	0.00
Brazil	3	0	0	3	0	5	−5	0.00
Burkina Faso	1	1	0	0	1	0	+1	100.00
Chile	1	0	0	1	0	3	−3	0.00
Colombia	1	0	0	1	0	2	−2	0.00
Congo	1	0	0	1	0	2	−2	0.00
Czech Republic	1	1	0	0	1	0	+1	100.00
Germany	1	0	0	1	0	4	−4	0.00
Hungary	1	1	0	0	2	1	+1	100.00
Iraq	1	0	0	1	0	3	−3	0.00
Italy	2	0	1	1	3	6	−3	0.00
Nigeria	2	0	1	1	2	4	−2	0.00
Paraguay	1	0	0	1	0	3	−3	0.00
Portugal	1	1	0	0	3	1	+2	100.00
South Korea	1	0	0	1	0	1	−1	0.00
Soviet Union	1	0	0	1	0	5	−5	0.00
Spain	2	0	0	2	1	4	−3	0.00
Syria	1	0	1	0	1	1	+0	0.00
Total	27	4	5	18	16	50	−34	14.81

== Honours ==
- CONCACAF U-20 Championship
  - Winners (2): 1986, 1996
  - Runners-up (2): 1978, 1984
  - Third place (3): 1992, 1994, 2001
- Football at the Jeux de la Francophonie
  - Winners (2): 1989, 1997

== See also ==
- Canada men's national soccer team
- Canada men's national under-23 soccer team
- Canada men's national under-17 soccer team
- Canada men's national under-15 soccer team
- Canada men's national futsal team
- Soccer in Canada
