= Haiti national under-20 football team =

Haiti
- Nickname(s): Les Grenadiers; Le Rouge et Bleu; Les Bicolores; La Sélection Nationale
- Association: Fédération Haïtienne de Football
- Confederation: CONCACAF
- Sub-confederation: CFU (Caribbean)
- Head coach: Wilfrid Montilas
- Home stadium: Stade Sylvio Cator
- FIFA code: HAI
First colours	Second colours

First international
- Mexico 5-0 Haiti, 1962

Biggest win
- Haiti 11-1 Bermuda, 2007

Biggest defeat
- Costa Rica 8-1 Haiti, 1962

CONCACAF U-20 Championship
- Appearances: 9 (first in 1962)
- Best result: Fifth place (twice)

The Haiti national under-20 football team represents Haiti in international football at this age level and is controlled by the Fédération Haïtienne de Football (FHF).

== Competitive record ==
=== FIFA U-20 World Cup ===
U-20 World Cup record record
Year	Result	Position	Pld	W	D*	L	GF	GA
1977 to 2019	Did not qualify							
(Indonesia) 2021	Cancelled							
2023 to 2025	Did not qualify							
(Azerbaijan) (Uzbekistan) 2027	To be determined							
Total		0/25						

=== CONCACAF Under-20 Championship ===
CONCACAF Under-20 Championship record
Year	Result	Position	Pld	W	D*	L	GF	GA
(Panama) 1962	Group stage	9th	3	0	1	2	2	14
(Guatemala) 1964	Did not enter							
(Cuba) 1970	Did not enter							
(Mexico) 1973	Did not enter							
(Canada) 1974	Did not enter							
(Puerto Rico) 1976	Did not enter							
(Honduras) 1978	Quarter-finals	8th	5	1	0	4	2	10
(United States) 1980	Withdrew as hosts							
(Guatemala) 1982	Did not qualify							
(Trinidad and Tobago) 1984	Group stage	10th	3	1	0	2	7	5
(Trinidad and Tobago) 1986	Did not qualify							
(Guatemala) 1988	Did not qualify							
(Guatemala) 1990	Did not qualify							
(Canada) 1992	Did not qualify							
(Honduras) 1994	Did not qualify							
(Mexico) 1996	Did not qualify							
(Guatemala) (Trinidad and Tobago) 1998	Did not qualify							
(Canada) (Trinidad and Tobago) 2001	Did not qualify							
(Panama) (United States) 2003	Fifth place	5th	3	1	1	1	2	3
(Honduras) (United States) 2005	Did not qualify							
(Panama) (Mexico) 2007	Fifth place	5th	3	1	0	2	5	7
(Trinidad and Tobago) 2009	Did not qualify							
(Guatemala) 2011	Did not qualify							
(Mexico) 2013	Group stage	9th	2	0	0	2	1	3
(Jamaica) 2015	Group stage	10th	5	0	3	2	7	10
(Costa Rica) 2017	Group stage	6th	3	1	0	2	7	8
(United States) 2018	Group stage	9th	4	3	0	1	9	1
(Honduras) 2020	Qualified; cancelled							
(Dominican Republic) 2022	Round of 16	13th	4	1	2	1	8	6
Total	Fifth place	10/29	35	9	7	19	50	67

=== Central American and Caribbean Games ===
Central American and Caribbean Games record
Year	Result	Position	Pld	W	D*	L	GF	GA
1930 to 1986	See Haiti national football team							
(Mexico) 1990	See Haiti national under-23 football team							
(Venezuela) 1993	Did not enter							
(Puerto Rico) 1998	Did not enter							
(El Salvador) 2002	Fourth place	4th	5	2	1	2	5	4
(Colombia) 2006	Group stage	7th	2	0	0	2	2	4
(Puerto Rico) 2010	Did not participate							
(Mexico) 2014	Group stage	9th	3	0	1	2	2	8
(Colombia) 2018	Fourth place	4th	5	1	1	3	3	9
(El Salvador) 2023	Did not participate							
Total	Fourth place	4/8	15	3	3	9	12	25

=== Jeux de la Francophonie ===
Jeux de la Francophonie
Year	Result	Position	Pld	W	D*	L	GF	GA
(Morocco) 1989	Did not enter							
(Madagascar) 1994	Did not enter							
(France) 1997	Did not enter							
(Canada) 2001	Group stage	10th	3	0	0	3	5	8
(Niger) 2005	Group stage	10th	3	0	0	3	2	8
(Lebanon) 2009	Did not enter							
(France) 2013	Group stage	8th	3	1	0	2	2	6
(Ivory Coast) 2017	Group stage	13th	3	0	1	2	2	4
(Democratic Republic of the Congo) 2023	Did not enter							
Total	Group stage	5/9	12	1	1	10	11	26

== Current squad ==
- The following players were called up for the 2022 CONCACAF U-20 Championship.
- Match dates: 18 June – 3 July 2022
- Caps and goals correct as of: 19 June 2022
- Names in italics denote players who have been capped for the senior team.

No.	Pos.	Player	Date of birth (age)	Caps	Goals	Club
1	GK	Congaros Medina	29 December 2004 (age 21)	0	0	(Haitian Football Federation) Violette AC
12	GK	Willemeson Augustin	21 July 2003 (age 22)	0	0	(Haitian Football Federation) Tempête FC
2	DF	Duckens Pierre	5 October 2004 (age 21)	0	0	(Haitian Football Federation) Don Bosco FC
4	DF	Fernando Ciceron	26 December 2003 (age 22)	0	0	(Haitian Football Federation) Violette AC
15	DF	Michelson Alexandre	1 May 2004 (age 21)	0	0	Unknown
17	DF	Kyan Champagne	19 February 2004 (age 22)	0	0	Unknown
6	MF	Woodensky Pierre	30 December 2004 (age 21)	0	0	(Haitian Football Federation) Violette AC
10	MF	Shad San Millán	25 June 2004 (age 21)	0	0	(Royal Spanish Football Federation) Getafe
14	MF	Édouard Vorbe	3 January 2004 (age 22)	0	0	(Haitian Football Federation) Violette AC
16	MF	Nicolas Lacombe	16 December 2004 (age 21)	0	0	(Royal Spanish Football Federation) UE Costa Brava
20	MF	Juff Éxilus	27 June 2003 (age 22)	0	0	(United States Soccer Federation) TSF FC
3	FW	Jean Leriche	27 January 2003 (age 23)	0	0	(Haitian Football Federation) Violette AC
5	FW	Ross Appolon	14 June 2004 (age 21)	0	0	(Canadian Soccer Association) FC Laval
7	FW	Bryan Destin	26 February 2006 (age 20)	0	0	(United States Soccer Federation) Inter Miami
8	FW	Joel Favard	30 June 2003 (age 22)	0	0	(United States Soccer Federation) F.C. New York
9	FW	Steevenson Jeudy	17 October 2004 (age 21)	0	0	(Haitian Football Federation) Violette AC
11	FW	Watz Leazard	17 June 2004 (age 21)	0	0	(Haitian Football Federation) Real Hope FA
13	FW	Omre Etienne	26 February 2003 (age 23)	0	0	(United States Soccer Federation) TSF FC
18	FW	Mateo Scott	4 June 2004 (age 21)	0	0	Unknown
19	FW	Adelson Belizaire	1 June 2005 (age 20)	0	0	(Haitian Football Federation) Baltimore SC

== Honours ==
Minor competitions

- Central American and Caribbean Games
  - Fourth place (2): 2002, 2018
- CFU Under-20 Championship
  - Winners (1): 2016
  - Runner-up (1): 2014

Friendly competitions

- Copa de Las Antillas
  - Winners (1): 2005
  - Runner-up (1): 2001

== See also ==
- Haiti national football team
- Haiti national under-23 football team
- Haiti national under-17 football team
- Haiti national under-15 football team
