= United States men's national under-20 soccer team =

National association football team

United States Under-20
- Nickname(s): Team USA; The Stars and Stripes; The Yanks
- Association: USSF
- Confederation: CONCACAF (North America)
- Head coach: Rob Valentino
- FIFA code: USA
First colors	Second colors

First international
- Jamaica 1–1 United States (Guatemala City, Guatemala; April 2, 1964)

Biggest win
- United States 13–0 U.S. Virgin Islands (Bradenton, Florida, United States; November 3, 2018)

Biggest defeat
- Mexico 7–1 United States (Bayamón, Puerto Rico; September 30, 1976)

FIFA U-20 World Cup
- Appearances: 18 (first in 1981)
- Best result: Fourth place (1989)

Pan American Games
- Appearances: 3 (first in 1987)
- Best result: Gold (1991)

CONCACAF Under-20 Championship
- Appearances: 27 (first in 1964)
- Best result: Champions (2017, 2018, 2022)
Medal record
Pan American Games
Gold medal – first place	1991 Havana	Team
CONCACAF Under-20 Championship
Gold medal – first place	2017 Costa Rica
Gold medal – first place	2018 United States
Gold medal – first place	2022 Honduras
Silver medal – second place	1980 United States
Silver medal – second place	1982 Guatemala
Silver medal – second place	1986 Trinidad and Tobago
Silver medal – second place	1992 Canada
Silver medal – second place	2009 Trinidad and Tobago
Silver medal – second place	2013 Mexico
Silver medal – second place	2024 Mexico
Silver medal – second place	2026 Mexico
Bronze medal – third place	1976 Puerto Rico
Bronze medal – third place	1988 Guatemala
Bronze medal – third place	1990 Guatemala
Bronze medal – third place	1996 Mexico
Bronze medal – third place	2015 Jamaica
- Website: ussoccer.com/u-20

The United States U-20 men's national soccer team is controlled by the United States Soccer Federation. The highest level of competition in which the team competes is the FIFA U-20 World Cup, which is held every two years.

The United States' best finish came in the 1989 FIFA World Youth Championship, when the U.S. beat Iraq in the quarterfinal before losing to Nigeria in overtime in the semifinal and Brazil in the third-place match. Steve Snow tied for second in the tournament with three goals.

The U.S. reached the quarterfinals in 1993 but lost to Brazil. After missing out in 1995, the U.S. began a run of six consecutive qualifications in 1997, reaching the second round in five consecutive tournaments. Of those tournaments, the best U.S. performance came in 2003, when the U.S. reached the quarterfinal and led Argentina 1–0 in the final minutes before falling 2–1 in extra time. The U.S. also reached the quarterfinal of the 2007 Cup before losing 2–1 in extra time to Austria.

== Competitive record ==
Champions Runners-up Third place Fourth place

=== FIFA U-20 World Cup ===
FIFA U-20 World Cup
Year	Result	Pos	Pld	W	D	L	F	A	Squad
(Tunisia) 1977	Did not qualify								
(Japan) 1979	Did not qualify								
(Australia) 1981	Group stage	15th	3	0	1	2	1	8	Squad
(Mexico) 1983	Group stage	11th	3	1	0	2	3	5	Squad
(Soviet Union) 1985	Did not qualify								
(Chile) 1987	Group stage	10th	3	1	0	2	2	3	Squad
(Saudi Arabia) 1989	Fourth place	4th	6	2	1	3	7	9	Squad
(Portugal) 1991	Did not qualify								
(Australia) 1993	Quarterfinals	8th	4	1	1	2	8	6	Squad
(Qatar) 1995	Did not qualify								
(Malaysia) 1997	Round of 16	15th	4	1	0	3	2	6	Squad
(Nigeria) 1999	Round of 16	11th	4	2	0	2	7	7	Squad
(Argentina) 2001	Round of 16	13th	4	1	1	2	5	5	Squad
(United Arab Emirates) 2003	Quarterfinals	5th	5	3	0	2	9	6	Squad
(Netherlands) 2005	Round of 16	11th	4	2	1	1	3	3	Squad
(Canada) 2007	Quarterfinals	7th	5	3	1	1	12	6	Squad
(Egypt) 2009	Group stage	18th	3	1	0	2	4	7	Squad
(Colombia) 2011	Did not qualify								
(Turkey) 2013	Group stage	22nd	3	0	1	2	3	9	Squad
(New Zealand) 2015	Quarterfinals	7th	5	3	1	1	7	4	Squad
(South Korea) 2017	Quarterfinals	6th	5	2	2	1	12	6	Squad
(Poland) 2019	Quarterfinals	6th	5	3	0	2	8	6	Squad
(Indonesia) 2021	Cancelled								
(Argentina) 2023	Quarterfinals	5th	5	4	0	1	10	2	Squad
(Chile) 2025	Quarterfinals	5th	5	3	0	2	17	6	Squad
(Azerbaijan) (Uzbekistan) 2027	Qualified								
(Armenia) (Georgia (country)) 2029	To be determined								
Total	18/27		76	33	10	33	120	104	

=== Pan American Games ===
Pan American Games
Year	Result	Pos	Pld	W	D	L	F	A	Squad
1951–1983	See United States men's national soccer team								
(United States) 1987	Group stage		3	1	1	1	3	3	—
(Cuba) 1991	Gold medal	1st	5	5	0	0	10	4	—
(Argentina) 1995	Group stage		3	0	0	3	0	9	—
1999–2003	See United States men's national under-23 soccer team								
2007	See United States men's national under-18 soccer team								
Since 2011	See United States men's national under-23 soccer team								
Total	1 Title		11	6	1	4	13	16	—

=== CONCACAF Under-20 Championship ===
CONCACAF Under-20 Championship
Year	Result	Pos	Pld	W	D	L	F	A	Squad
(Panama) 1962	did not enter								
(Guatemala) 1964	Group stage		4	0	2	2	4	8	—
(Cuba) 1970	did not enter								
(Mexico) 1973	did not enter								
(Canada) 1974	Playoff round		4	2	2	0	5	3	—
(Puerto Rico) 1976	Third place	3rd	7	5	0	2	19	10	—
(Honduras) 1978	Second round		5	2	1	2	7	4	—
(United States) 1980	Runners-up	2nd	7	5	1	1	15	4	—
(Guatemala) 1982	Runners-up	2nd	7	4	2	1	14	5	—
(Trinidad and Tobago) 1984	Fourth place	4th	8	3	2	3	11	8	—
(Trinidad and Tobago) 1986	Runners-up	2nd	7	3	2	2	10	3	—
(Guatemala) 1988	Third place	3rd	7	4	0	3	11	9	—
(Guatemala) 1990	Third place	3rd	5	3	0	2	10	5	—
(Canada) 1992	Runners-up	2nd	6	5	0	1	15	4	—
(Honduras) 1994	Group stage	5th	3	2	0	1	9	4	—
(Mexico) 1996	Third place	3rd	5	2	1	2	7	5	—
(Guatemala) (Trinidad and Tobago) 1998	1st, Group B		3	2	1	0	12	3	—
(Canada) (Trinidad and Tobago) 2001	2nd, Group A		3	2	1	0	11	2	—
(Panama) (United States) 2003	2nd, Group B		3	2	0	1	5	3	—
(United States) (Honduras) 2005	1st, Group A		3	3	0	0	10	1	Squad
(Panama) (Mexico) 2007	1st, Group A		3	2	1	0	9	1	Squad
(Trinidad and Tobago) 2009	Runners-up	2nd	5	2	2	1	5	3	Squad
(Guatemala) 2011	Quarterfinal	5th	3	2	0	1	7	2	Squad
(Mexico) 2013	Runners-up	2nd	5	4	0	1	10	6	Squad
(Jamaica) 2015	Third place	3rd	6	4	1	1	14	2	Squad
(Costa Rica) 2017	Champions	1st	6	4	1	1	11	4	Squad
(United States) 2018	Champions	1st	8	8	0	0	46	2	Squad
(Honduras) 2020	Cancelled								
(Honduras) 2022	Champions	1st	7	6	1	0	31	2	Squad
(Mexico) 2024	Runners-up	2nd	6	5	0	1	18	3	Squad
(Mexico) 2026	Runners-up	2nd	6	5	0	1	16	3	Squad
Total	3 Titles		142	91	21	30	342	109	—

== Honors ==
- FIFA U-20 World Cup
  - Fourth Place (1): 1989
- CONCACAF U-20 Championship
  - Winners (3): 2017, 2018, 2022
  - Runners-up (7): 1980, 1982, 1986, 1992, 2009, 2013, 2024

== Recent results and fixtures ==
The following is a list of match results in the last 12 months, as well as any future matches that have been scheduled.

Win Draw Loss Fixture

=== 2025 ===
November 15 Friendly	Costa Rica	1–2	United States	Alajuela, Costa Rica
10:00 am CST	Hernández 71'	Report	Figueroa; Davis	Stadium: Estadio Piedades de Santa Ana

November 18 Friendly	Costa Rica	0–4	United States	Alajuela, Costa Rica
10:00 am CST		Report		Stadium: Estadio Piedades de Santa Ana

=== 2026 ===
March 27 Friendly	Argentina	0–3	United States	Ezeiza, Argentina
10:00 EDT		Report	Olivas; Swan; Darboe	Stadium: Predio Deportivo Lionel Andrés Messi; Attendance: 0

March 31 Friendly	Independiente XI	v	United States	Villa Dominico, Argentina
09:30 EDT				Stadium: Villa Dominico Independiente Training Complex; Attendance: 0

June 5 Friendly	Georgia	0–1	United States	Blagoevgrad, Bulgaria
		Report	Jamison	Stadium: Stadion Hristo Botev

June 8 Friendly	North Macedonia	0–2	United States	Blagoevgrad, Bulgaria
		Report	Klapija; Medina	Stadium: Stadion Hristo Botev

July 25 2026 CONCACAF U-20 Championship GS	United States	3–0	Haiti	Puebla, Mexico
20:00	Klapija 38'; Ramos 62' (pen.); Morales 89' (pen.)	Report		Stadium: Estadio Universitario BUAP; Referee: Michael Venne (Canada)

July 28 2026 CONCACAF U-20 Championship GS	El Salvador	0–3	United States	Puebla, Mexico
20:00		Report	Klapija 35' (pen.); Ramos 61' (pen.); Cupps 89'	Stadium: Estadio Universitario BUAP; Referee: Félix Mojica (Nicaragua)

July 31 2026 CONCACAF U-20 Championship GS	United States	5–0	Cuba	Puebla, Mexico
20:00	Ramos 2'; Shaw 26'; Dayes 75'; Torquato 78'; Vanney 82'	Report		Stadium: Estadio Universitario BUAP; Referee: Jorge Leira (Panama)

August 4 2026 CONCACAF U-20 Championship QF	United States	3–1	Guatemala	Puebla, Mexico
19:00	Dayes 45+5'; Klapija 68'; Torquato 75'	Report	De León 36'	Stadium: Estadio Cuauhtémoc; Referee: Shavin Greene (Guyana)

August 7 2026 CONCACAF U-20 Championship SF	Costa Rica	0–2	United States	Mexico City, Mexico
15:00		Report	Ramos 37'; Applewhite 77'	Stadium: Estadio Banorte; Referee: Jorge Leira (Panama)

August 9 2026 CONCACAF U-20 Championship F	United States	0–2	Mexico	Mexico City, Mexico
17:00		Report	Alfaro 28', 69'	Stadium: Estadio Banorte; Attendance: 36,000; Referee: Adonis Carrasco (Dominican Republic)

== Players ==
=== Current squad ===
The following 20 players were named to the squad for the 2026 CONCACAF U-20 Championship.

Caps and goals are updated as of August 9, 2026 after the match against Mexico.

No.	Pos.	Player	Date of birth (age)	Caps	Goals	Club
1	GK	Kayne Rizvanovich	October 26, 2007 (age 19)	5	0	(United States Soccer Federation) Minnesota United FC 2
	GK	Giorgio De Marzi	April 18, 2007 (age 19)	0	0	(Italian Football Federation) Roma
3	DF	Joshua Torquato	July 24, 2007 (age 19)	6	2	(United States Soccer Federation) FC Dallas
20	DF	Christopher Cupps	May 26, 2008 (age 18)	4	1	(United States Soccer Federation) Chicago Fire FC
	DF	Pedro Guimaraes	April 10, 2008 (age 18)	0	0	(German Football Association) Eintracht Frankfurt II
	DF	Ramiz Hamouda	May 26, 2008 (age 18)	0	0	(United States Soccer Federation) Birmingham Legion FC
	DF	Enrique "Kike" Martinez	June 12, 2008 (age 18)	0	0	(United States Soccer Federation) Ventura County FC
	DF	Harbor Miller	June 21, 2007 (age 19)	5	1	(United States Soccer Federation) LA Galaxy
6	MF	Colin Guske	January 29, 2007 (age 19)	6	0	(United States Soccer Federation) Orlando City SC
15	MF	Cooper Sanchez	March 26, 2008 (age 18)	4	0	(United States Soccer Federation) Atlanta United
	MF	Snyder Brunell	March 27, 2007 (age 19)	0	0	Seattle Sounders
	FW	Xanti Oyharçabal	15 February 2007 (age 19)	0	0	(Royal Spanish Football Federation) Athletic Bilbao B
	MF	Jonathan Shore	April 13, 2007 (age 19)	0	0	(United States Soccer Federation) New York City FC
	MF	Ervin Torres	November 14, 2007 (age 19)	0	0	(United States Soccer Federation) Austin FC
7	FW	Jaidyn Contreras	September 26, 2007 (age 19)	0	0	(Mexican Football Federation) Tigres UANL
9	FW	Dino Klapija	5 January 2007 (age 19)	8	4	(German Football Association) RB Leipzig II
17	FW	Rubén Ramos	22 January 2007 (age 19)	6	4	(United States Soccer Federation) LA Galaxy
	FW	Marvin Dills	April 25, 2007 (age 19)	1	0	(German Football Association) Eintracht Frankfurt
	FW	Dániel Pintér	6 June 2007 (age 19)	0	0	(United States Soccer Federation) Inter Miami CF
	FW	Darius Randell	August 25, 2007 (age 19)	0	0	(United States Soccer Federation) Minnesota United FC

=== Recent call-ups ===
The following players have been called up for the team in the past 12 months.

- 2026 CONCACAF U-20 Championship.
- June 2026 friendlies.
- March 2026 friendlies.
- January 2026 training camp.
- November 2025 friendlies.

Pos.	Player	Date of birth (age)	Caps	Goals	Club	Latest call-up
GK	William Lodmell	February 5, 2008 (age 18)	1	0	(Portugal) Sporting CP B	2026 CONCACAF U-20 Championship
GK	Lucas McPartlin	June 16, 2007 (age 19)	0	0	(United States) St. Louis City 2	2026 CONCACAF U-20 Championship
GK	Adam Beaudry	18 April 2006 (age 20)	12	0	(United States) Colorado Rapids	June 2026 friendlies
GK	Zackory Campagnolo	March 12, 2007 (age 19)	1	0	(United States) Colorado Rapids 2	June 2026 friendlies
GK	Julian Eyestone	21 April 2006 (age 20)	3	0	(England) Brentford	March 2026 friendlies
GK	Andrew Rick	30 January 2006 (age 20)	1	0	(United States) Philadelphia Union	March 2026 friendlies
GK	Ryan Carney	7 May 2006 (age 20)	0	0	(United States) Providence	January 2026 training camp
GK	Blake Kelly	22 January 2006 (age 20)	0	0	(United States) Notre Dame	January 2026 training camp
DF	Brandon Dayes	December 17, 2008 (age 17)	6	2	(United States) Louisville City FC	2026 CONCACAF U-20 Championship
DF	Chris Applewhite	August 23, 2006 (age 20)	5	1	(United States) Nashville SC	2026 CONCACAF U-20 Championship
DF	Braden Dunham	October 3, 2007 (age 19)	4	0	(United States) Furman	2026 CONCACAF U-20 Championship
DF	Tristan Brown	October 17, 2006 (age 20)	4	0	(United States) Columbus Crew	2026 CONCACAF U-20 Championship
DF	Javaun Mussenden	September 5, 2007 (age 19)	6	0	(United States) New England Revolution II	2026 CONCACAF U-20 Championship
DF	Freddie Anderson	13 October 2006 (age 20)	1	0	(England) Stoke City F.C. Under-21s	June 2026 friendlies
DF	Stuart Hawkins	18 September 2006 (age 20)	1	0	(United States) Seattle Sounders FC	June 2026 friendlies
DF	Sawyer Jura	9 March 2006 (age 20)	0	0	(United States) Portland Timbers	June 2026 friendlies
DF	Owen Presthus	21 February 2006 (age 20)	1	0	(United States) Columbus Crew	June 2026 friendlies
DF	Tahir Reid-Brown	6 July 2006 (age 20)	1	0	(United States) Orlando City	June 2026 friendlies
DF	Elijah Scott	3 February 2006 (age 20)	1	0	(Italy) Lecce	June 2026 friendlies
DF	Luca Bombino	July 10, 2006 (age 20)	11	0	(United States) San Diego FC	March 2026 friendlies
DF	Shakir Nixon	February 27, 2006 (age 20)	0	0	(United States) UCLA	March 2026 friendlies
DF	Finn Sundstrom	November 19, 2006 (age 20)	0	0	(United States) Philadelphia Union	March 2026 friendlies
DF	Griffin Garnett	23 August 2006 (age 20)	0	0	(United States) Richmond Kickers	January 2026 training camp
DF	Jamie Kabuusu	18 April 2006 (age 20)	0	0	(United States) Duke	January 2026 training camp
DF	Daniel Krueger	4 January 2006 (age 20)	0	0	(United States) Wake Forest	January 2026 training camp
DF	Tate Lampman	September 9, 2006 (age 20)	0	0	(United States) Georgetown	January 2026 training camp
DF	Riley Dalgado	13 August 2006 (age 20)	1	0	(United States) Ventura County FC	November 2025 friendlies
DF	Christian Diaz	30 March 2006 (age 20)	1	0	(United States) Los Angeles FC 2	November 2025 friendlies
MF	Alex Shaw	April 3, 2008 (age 18)	6	1	(United States) Inter Miami CF II	2026 CONCACAF U-20 Championship
MF	Santiago Morales	February 9, 2007 (age 19)	1	1	(United States) Inter Miami CF	2026 CONCACAF U-20 Championship
FW	Dylan Vanney	November 29, 2007 (age 18)	6	1	(United States) Ventura County FC	2026 CONCACAF U-20 Championship
MF	Devon De Corte	13 May 2006 (age 20)	1	0	(Belgium) RSCA Futures	June 2026 friendlies
MF	Aron John	3 April 2006 (age 20)	0	0	(United States) Crown Legacy FC	June 2026 friendlies
MF	Eric Klein	20 November 2006 (age 19)	1	0	(United States) New England Revolution	June 2026 friendlies
MF	Cruz Medina	September 24, 2006 (age 20)	5	3	(Mexico) Tapatío	June 2026 friendlies
MF	Edwyn Mendoza	3 May 2006 (age 20)	1	0	(United States) San Jose Earthquakes	June 2026 friendlies
MF	David Vazquez	22 February 2006 (age 20)	7	3	(United States) San Diego FC	
MF	Taha Habroune	February 5, 2006 (age 20)	18	4	(United States) Columbus Crew	March 2026 friendlies
MF	Diego Garcia Murillo	17 October 2006 (age 20)	1	0	(United States) FC Dallas	January 2026 training camp
MF	Christian Mendoza	23 December 2006 (age 19)	0	0	(United States) Portland Timbers	January 2026 training camp
MF	Ian Shaul	1 February 2006 (age 20)	0	0	(United States) Portland Timbers	January 2026 training camp
MF	Peter Soudan	1 February 2006 (age 20)	0	0	(United States) Michigan State	January 2026 training camp
MF	CJ Olney	16 December 2006 (age 19)	0	0	(United States) Philadelphia Union	November 2025 friendlies
FW	Nimfasha Berchimas	February 22, 2008 (age 18)	2	0	(United States) Charlotte FC	2026 CONCACAF U-20 Championship
FW	Xanti Oyharçabal	15 February 2007 (age 19)	5	0	(Spain) Athletic Bilbao B	2026 CONCACAF U-20 Championship
FW	Colton Swan	3 May 2007 (age 19)	4	0	(United States) Charleston Battery	2026 CONCACAF U-20 Championship
FW	Dylan Borso	2 June 2006 (age 20)	0	0	(United States) Chicago Fire	June 2026 friendlies
FW	Bajung Darboe	7 November 2006 (age 20)	1	0	(Germany) FC Bayern Munich II	June 2026 friendlies
FW	Andre Gitau	26 November 2006 (age 19)	1	0	(Germany) Mainz 05	June 2026 friendlies
FW	Bryce Jamison	6 January 2006 (age 20)	0	0	(United States) Colorado Rapids	June 2026 friendlies
FW	Mykhi Joyner	30 August 2006 (age 20)	2	0	(United States) St. Louis City SC	June 2026 friendlies
FW	Sal Olivas Jr.	11 June 2006 (age 20)	0	0	(United States) Philadelphia Union	March 2026 friendlies
FW	Brent Adu-Gyamfi	12 March 2006 (age 20)	0	0	(United States) Columbus Crew 2	January 2026 training camp
FW	Michael Ramirez	4 February 2006 (age 20)	0	0	(United States) Michigan	January 2026 training camp
FW	Nicholas Simmonds	17 December 2006 (age 19)	0	0	(United States) Virginia	January 2026 training camp
FW	Keyrol Figueroa	31 August 2006 (age 20)	7	1	(England) Liverpool	November 2025 friendlies
FW	Lionel Gitau	March 1, 2008 (age 18)	2	1	(United States) Houston Dynamo FC Academy	November 2025 friendlies
FW	Edward Davis	17 June 2006 (age 20)	1	1	(United States) Philadelphia Union	November 2025 friendlies
FW	Micah Burton	26 March 2006 (age 20)	1	0	(United States) Austin FC	November 2025 friendlies

- ALT-Alternate
- INJ-Injury
- PRE-Withdrawn prior to competition

== Top goalscorers ==
Rank	Player	Year(s)	U-20 Goals
1	Brek Shea	2007–2009	17
2	Freddy Adu	2003–2009	16
3	Romain Gall	2014–2015	13
3	Scott E. Kennedy	1992–1993	13
5	Eddie Johnson	2003–2004	12
5	Jacob Peterson	2004–2005	12
7	Jeremy Ebobisse	2016–2017	11
8	Will John	2005	10
8	Niko Tsakiris	2022–present	10
9	Chad Barrett	2004–2005	9

== Coaches ==
Name	Years
Angus McAlpine	1983
Derek Armstrong	1987
Bob Gansler	1989
Bobby Howe	1993
Jay Hoffman	1997
Sigi Schmid	1998–1999
Wolfgang Sühnholz	1999–2001
Thomas Rongen	2002–2004
Sigi Schmid	2005
Thomas Rongen	2006–2011
Tab Ramos	2011–2019
Anthony Hudson	2020–2021
Mikey Varas	2021–2023
Michael Nsien	2024
Marko Mitrović	2024–2025
Rob Valentino	2026

== Head-to-head record ==
The following table shows United States' head-to-head record in the FIFA U-20 World Cup.

Opponent	Pld	W	D	L	GF	GA	GD	Win %
Argentina	2	1	0	1	2	2	+0	50.00
Austria	1	0	0	1	1	2	−1	0.00
Brazil	4	1	0	3	3	9	−6	25.00
Bulgaria	1	0	0	1	0	1	−1	0.00
Cameroon	2	2	0	0	7	2	+5	100.00
China	2	1	0	1	1	1	+0	50.00
Chile	1	1	0	0	4	1	+3	100.00
Colombia	1	1	0	0	1	0	+1	100.00
East Germany	1	1	0	0	2	0	+2	100.00
Ecuador	3	1	1	1	5	5	+0	33.33
Egypt	2	1	0	1	1	2	−1	50.00
England	2	1	0	1	1	1	+0	50.00
Fiji	1	1	0	0	3	0	+3	100.00
France	3	2	1	0	7	3	+4	66.67
Germany	4	0	1	3	2	8	−6	0.00
Ghana	2	0	0	2	1	5	−4	0.00
Iraq	1	1	0	0	2	1	+1	100.00
Italy	2	1	0	1	4	3	+1	50.00
Ivory Coast	2	2	0	0	3	0	+3	100.00
Japan	1	0	0	1	1	3	−2	0.00
Mali	1	0	1	0	1	1	+0	0.00
Morocco					—			
Myanmar	1	1	0	0	2	1	+1	100.00
New Caledonia	1	1	0	0	9	1	+8	100.00
New Zealand	3	3	0	0	14	0	+14	100.00
Nigeria	2	1	0	1	3	2	+1	50.00
Paraguay	1	1	0	0	3	1	+2	100.00
Poland	3	1	0	2	6	7	−1	33.33
Qatar	2	1	1	0	2	1	+1	50.00
Republic of Ireland	1	0	0	1	1	2	−1	0.00
Saudi Arabia	2	1	1	0	2	1	+1	50.00
Senegal	1	1	0	0	1	0	+1	100.00
Serbia	1	0	1	0	0	0	+0	0.00
Slovakia	1	1	0	0	2	0	+2	100.00
South Africa	1	0	0	1	1	2	−1	0.00
South Korea	4	1	2	1	5	6	−1	25.00
Spain	2	0	0	2	3	7	−4	0.00
Turkey	1	1	0	0	6	0	+6	100.00
Ukraine	3	0	1	2	2	6	−4	0.00
Uruguay	5	1	0	4	4	12	−8	20.00
Venezuela	1	0	0	1	1	2	−1	0.00
Total	75	33	10	32	119	101	+18	44.00

== See also ==
- United States men's national soccer team
- United States men's national under-17 soccer team
- United States men's national under-18 soccer team
- United States men's national under-19 soccer team
- United States men's national under-23 soccer team
