= 1976 CONCACAF U-20 Tournament =

Tournament details
- Host country: Puerto Rico
- Cities: San Juan; Aguadilla
- Dates: 19 September – 6 October
- Teams: 15
- Venues: Estadio Sixto Escobar; Estadio Country Club; Estadio Baldrich; Parque Colón

Final positions
- Champions: Mexico (5th title)
- Runners-up: Honduras
- Third place: United States
- Fourth place: Guatemala

The 1976 CONCACAF Under-20 Championship was held in Puerto Rico. It also served as qualification for the 1977 FIFA World Youth Championship.

== Teams ==
The following teams entered the tournament:

Region	Team(s)
Caribbean (CFU)	Barbados; Bermuda; Dominican Republic; Jamaica; Netherlands Antilles; Puerto Rico (host); Suriname; Trinidad and Tobago
Central America (UNCAF)	El Salvador; Guatemala; Honduras; Nicaragua
North America (NAFU)	Canada; Mexico; United States

== Round 1 ==
=== Group 1 ===
Teams	Pld	W	D	L	GF	GA	GD	Pts
Honduras	3	3	0	0	12	0	+12	6
Dominican Republic	3	1	0	2	6	7	–1	2
Barbados	3	1	0	2	4	8	–4	2
Puerto Rico	3	1	0	2	3	10	–7	2

Puerto Rico	1–4	Dominican Republic
Honduras	4–0	Barbados
Puerto Rico	2–1	Barbados
Barbados	3–2	Dominican Republic
Puerto Rico	0–5	Honduras
Honduras	3–0	Dominican Republic

=== Group 2 ===
Teams	Pld	W	D	L	GF	GA	GD	Pts
United States	2	2	0	0	4	0	+4	4
Nicaragua	2	1	0	1	2	2	0	2
Bermuda	2	0	0	2	1	5	–4	0

United States	3–0	Bermuda
Bermuda	1–2	Nicaragua
United States	1–0	Nicaragua

=== Group 3 ===
Teams	Pld	W	D	L	GF	GA	GD	Pts
Guatemala	3	2	1	0	7	2	+5	5
Canada	3	1	1	1	5	4	+1	3
Jamaica	3	1	0	2	4	4	0	2
Netherlands Antilles	3	1	0	2	3	9	–6	2

Netherlands Antilles	3–2	Jamaica
Canada	2–2	Guatemala
Canada	3–0	Netherlands Antilles
Jamaica	0–1	Guatemala
Guatemala	4–0	Netherlands Antilles
Canada	0–2	Jamaica

=== Group 4 ===
Teams	Pld	W	D	L	GF	GA	GD	Pts
Mexico	3	3	0	0	11	1	+10	6
Trinidad and Tobago	3	1	1	1	4	7	–3	3
Suriname	3	1	0	2	8	8	0	2
El Salvador	3	0	1	2	2	9	–7	1

Trinidad and Tobago	4–2	Suriname
Mexico	3–1	El Salvador
Mexico	5–0	Trinidad and Tobago
El Salvador	1–6	Suriname
El Salvador	0–0	Trinidad and Tobago
Mexico	3–0	Suriname

== Round 2 ==
=== Group A ===
Teams	Pld	W	D	L	GF	GA	GD	Pts
Mexico	3	3	0	0	20	2	+18	6
United States	3	2	0	1	14	9	+5	4
Canada	3	1	0	2	9	9	0	2
Dominican Republic	3	0	0	3	1	24	–23	0

Mexico	5–0	Canada
United States	9–0	Dominican Republic
Canada	7–0	Dominican Republic
United States	1–7	Mexico
Mexico	8–1	Dominican Republic
United States	4–2	Canada

=== Group B ===
Teams	Pld	W	D	L	GF	GA	GD	Pts
Honduras	3	3	0	0	11	3	+8	6
Guatemala	3	2	0	1	3	1	+2	4
Trinidad and Tobago	3	0	1	2	5	7	–2	1
Nicaragua	3	0	1	2	2	10	–8	1

Guatemala	1–0	Trinidad and Tobago
Honduras	6–0	Nicaragua
Nicaragua	2–2	Trinidad and Tobago
Guatemala	0–1	Honduras
Guatemala	2–0	Nicaragua
Honduras	4–3	Trinidad and Tobago

== Semifinals ==
3 October 1976

Mexico	2 – 0	Guatemala

3 October 1976

Honduras	1 – 0	United States

== Third place match ==
5 October 1976

United States	1 – 0	Guatemala

== Final ==
6 October 1976

Mexico	0 – 0	Honduras
Penalties
	3 – 2

1976 CONCACAF U-20 Championship

Mexico
Fifth title

== Qualification to World Youth Championship ==
The two best performing teams qualified for the 1977 FIFA World Youth Championship.

- Honduras
- Mexico
