= CFU U-20 Tournament =

- Region: Caribbean (CFU)
- Current champions: Haiti

was

The CFU U-20 Tournament was the Caribbean championship of football for male players under the age of 20 and was organized by the Caribbean Football Union (CFU). It acted as a qualifying tournament for the CONCACAF U-20 Championship.

Year	Host	Winner	Runner-up
2014	(Trinidad and Tobago) (Final round)	Trinidad and Tobago	Haiti
2016	(Curaçao) (Final round)	Haiti	Antigua and Barbuda
