= 1996 CONCACAF U-20 Tournament =

Premundial CONCACAF Sub-20 1996 (in Spanish)

Tournament details
- Host country: Mexico
- Dates: 14–25 April 1996 (11 days)
- Teams: 12 (from 1 confederation)

Final positions
- Champions: Canada (2nd title)
- Runners-up: Mexico
- Third place: United States
- Fourth place: Costa Rica

The 1996 CONCACAF U-20 Tournament was a football tournament that was played in April 1996 in Mexico. It determined the four CONCACAF teams that participated at the 1997 FIFA World Youth Championship.

== Qualification ==
Team 1	Agg.	Team 2	1st leg	2nd leg
Aruba	1–4	Netherlands Antilles	1–0	0–4

Team 1	Agg.	Team 2	1st leg	2nd leg
Netherlands Antilles	4–1	Dominican Republic	4–1	0–0

Other qualification matches may have been played.

== Qualified teams ==
The following teams entered the tournament:

Region	Team(s)
Caribbean (CFU)	Jamaica; Martinique; Netherlands Antilles; Trinidad and Tobago
Central America (UNCAF)	Costa Rica; El Salvador; Guatemala; Honduras; Nicaragua
North America (NAFU)	Canada; Mexico (host); United States

== Group stage ==
=== Group 1 ===
Pos	Team	Pld	W	D	L	GF	GA	GD	Pts	Qualification
1	Mexico	3	3	0	0	7	0	+7	9	Qualified to Malaysia 1997
2	Guatemala	3	1	1	1	3	3	0	4	Qualified to Qualifying group
3	Netherlands Antilles	3	0	2	1	1	5	−4	2	
4	El Salvador	3	0	1	2	3	6	−3	1	

14 April 1996
Day 1

Mexico	4 – 0	Netherlands Antilles

14 April 1996
Day 1

El Salvador	2 – 3	Guatemala

16 April 1996
Day 2

Mexico	1 – 0	Guatemala

16 April 1996
Day 2

El Salvador	1 – 1	Netherlands Antilles

18 April 1996
Day 3

Guatemala	0 – 0	Netherlands Antilles

18 April 1996
Day 3

Mexico	2 – 0	El Salvador

=== Group 2 ===
Pos	Team	Pld	W	D	L	GF	GA	GD	Pts	Qualification
1	United States	3	2	1	0	6	1	+5	7	Qualified to Malaysia 1997
2	Jamaica	3	2	0	1	5	4	+1	6	Qualified to Qualifying group
3	Honduras	3	1	1	1	3	1	+2	4	
4	Martinique	3	0	0	3	0	8	−8	0	

15 April 1996
Day 1

Honduras	3 – 0	Martinique

15 April 1996
Day 1

Jamaica	1 – 4	United States

17 April 1996
Day 2

Honduras	0 – 1	Jamaica

17 April 1996
Day 2

Martinique	0 – 2	United States

19 April 1996
Day 3

Honduras	0 – 0	United States

19 April 1996
Day 3

Jamaica	3 – 0	Martinique

=== Group 3 ===
Pos	Team	Pld	W	D	L	GF	GA	GD	Pts	Qualification
1	Canada	3	3	0	0	6	0	+6	9	Qualified to Malaysia 1997
2	Costa Rica	3	2	0	1	8	2	+6	6	Qualified to Qualifying group
3	Trinidad and Tobago	3	1	0	2	6	7	−1	3	
4	Nicaragua	3	0	0	3	1	12	−11	0	

15 April 1996
Day 1

Costa Rica	3 – 0	Nicaragua

15 April 1996
Day 1

Canada	1 – 0	Trinidad and Tobago
Munoz 40'

17 April 1996
Day 2

Costa Rica	5 – 0	Trinidad and Tobago

17 April 1996
Day 2

Canada	3 – 0	Nicaragua
De Rosario 57', 85'; Jordan 67'

19 April 1996
Day 3

Canada	2 – 0	Costa Rica
Kindel 72', 76'

19 April 1996
Day 3

Nicaragua	1 – 6	Trinidad and Tobago

== Final stage ==
=== Qualifying group ===
Pos	Team	Pld	W	D	L	GF	GA	GD	Pts	Qualification
1	Costa Rica	2	2	0	0	4	2	+2	6	Qualified to Malaysia 1997
2	Guatemala	2	0	1	1	1	2	−1	1	
3	Jamaica	2	0	1	1	1	2	−1	1	

21 April 1996
Day 1

Costa Rica	2 – 1	Guatemala

23 April 1996
Day 2

Costa Rica	2 – 1	Jamaica

25 April 1996
Day 3

Guatemala	0 – 0	Jamaica

=== Championship group ===
Pos	Team	Pld	W	D	L	GF	GA	GD	Pts	Qualification
1	Canada (C)	2	1	1	0	4	2	+2	4	1996 CONCACAF U-20 Tournament champions
2	Mexico	2	1	1	0	4	3	+1	4	
3	United States	2	0	0	2	1	4	−3	0	

(C) Champions
21 April 1996
Day 1

Mexico	2 – 2	Canada
Gutierrez 55'; Rodriguez 75'		De Rosario 57'; Kindel 87'

23 April 1996
Day 2

Canada	2 – 0	United States
De Rosario 81'; Jordan 83'

25 April 1996
Day 3

Mexico	2 – 1	United States

1996 CONCACAF U-20 Championship

Canada
Second title

== Final ranking ==
Pos	Team	Pld	W	D	L	GF	GA	GD	Pts	Final result
1	Canada	5	4	1	0	10	2	+8	13	Champions
2	Mexico (H)	5	4	1	0	11	3	+8	13	Runners-up
3	United States	5	2	1	2	7	5	+2	7	Third place
4	Costa Rica	5	4	0	1	12	4	+8	12	Fourth Place
5	Jamaica	5	2	1	2	6	6	0	7	Lost in Qualification Round
6	Guatemala	5	1	2	2	4	5	−1	5	Lost in Qualification Round
7	Honduras	3	1	1	1	3	1	+2	4	Eliminated in Group stage
8	Trinidad and Tobago	3	1	0	2	6	7	−1	3	Eliminated in Group stage
9	Netherlands Antilles	3	0	2	1	1	5	−4	2	Eliminated in Group stage
10	El Salvador	3	0	1	2	3	6	−3	1	Eliminated in Group stage
11	Martinique	3	0	0	3	0	8	−8	0	Eliminated in Group stage
12	Nicaragua	3	0	0	3	1	12	−11	0	Eliminated in Group stage

Source: rsssf.com
(H) Hosts

Note: Per statistical convention in football, matches decided in extra time are counted as wins and losses, while matches decided by penalty shoot-out are counted as draws.

== Qualification to World Youth Championship ==
The four best performing teams qualified for the 1997 FIFA World Youth Championship.

- Canada
- Costa Rica
- Mexico
- United States
