= 1982 CONCACAF U-20 Tournament =

Tournament details
- Host country: Guatemala
- Dates: 15 August – 5 September
- Teams: 12

Final positions
- Champions: Honduras (1st title)
- Runners-up: United States
- Third place: Costa Rica
- Fourth place: Guatemala

The 1982 CONCACAF Under-20 Championship was held in Guatemala. It also served as qualification for the 1983 FIFA World Youth Championship.

== Teams ==
The following teams entered the tournament:

| Region | Team(s) |
|---|---|
| Caribbean (CFU) | Bermuda; Jamaica; Netherlands Antilles; Puerto Rico; Trinidad and Tobago |
| Central America (UNCAF) | Costa Rica; El Salvador; Guatemala (host); Honduras; Nicaragua |
| North America (NAFU) | Canada; United States |

== Round 1 ==
=== Group 1 ===
Estadio Doroteo Guamuch Flores, Guatemala City

| Teams | Pld | W | D | L | GF | GA | GD | Pts |
|---|---|---|---|---|---|---|---|---|
| United States | 3 | 2 | 1 | 0 | 8 | 1 | +7 | 5 |
| Guatemala | 3 | 2 | 0 | 1 | 6 | 3 | +3 | 4 |
| Jamaica | 3 | 1 | 1 | 1 | 6 | 3 | +3 | 3 |
| Puerto Rico | 3 | 0 | 0 | 3 | 0 | 13 | –13 | 0 |

| 15 August | Puerto Rico | 0–5 | United States |
| | Guatemala | 3–0 | Jamaica |
| 19 August | United States | 0–0 | Jamaica |
| | Puerto Rico | 0–2 | Guatemala |
| 22 August | Jamaica | 6–0 | Puerto Rico |
| | Guatemala | 1–3 | United States |

=== Group 2 ===
Estadio Pensativo, Antigua Guatemala

| Teams | Pld | W | D | L | GF | GA | GD | Pts |
|---|---|---|---|---|---|---|---|---|
| Honduras | 3 | 2 | 1 | 0 | 7 | 3 | +4 | 5 |
| Canada | 3 | 2 | 0 | 1 | 6 | 3 | +3 | 4 |
| Trinidad and Tobago | 3 | 1 | 1 | 1 | 7 | 5 | +2 | 3 |
| Netherlands Antilles | 3 | 0 | 0 | 3 | 2 | 11 | –9 | 0 |

| 17 August | Honduras | 2–2 | Trinidad and Tobago |
| | Canada | 3–1 | Netherlands Antilles |
| 19 August | Honduras | 3–0 | Netherlands Antilles |
| | Canada | 2–0 | Trinidad and Tobago |
| 22 August | Trinidad and Tobago | 5–1 | Netherlands Antilles |
| | Canada | 1–2 | Honduras |

=== Group 3 ===
Estadio Carlos Salazar Hijo, Mazatenango

| Teams | Pld | W | D | L | GF | GA | GD | Pts |
|---|---|---|---|---|---|---|---|---|
| Costa Rica | 3 | 3 | 0 | 0 | 12 | 2 | +10 | 6 |
| El Salvador | 3 | 2 | 0 | 1 | 12 | 4 | +8 | 4 |
| Bermuda | 3 | 1 | 0 | 2 | 3 | 4 | –1 | 2 |
| Nicaragua | 3 | 0 | 0 | 3 | 1 | 18 | –17 | 0 |

| 17 August | El Salvador | 8–0 | Nicaragua |
| | Costa Rica | 1–0 | Bermuda |
| 19 August | Costa Rica | 8–0 | Nicaragua |
| | El Salvador | 2–1 | Bermuda |
| 22 August | Nicaragua | 1–2 | Bermuda |
| | El Salvador | 2–3 | Costa Rica |

== Round 2 ==
=== Group A ===
Estadio Doroteo Guamuch Flores, Guatemala City

| Teams | Pld | W | D | L | GF | GA | GD | Pts |
|---|---|---|---|---|---|---|---|---|
| United States | 2 | 1 | 1 | 0 | 3 | 2 | +1 | 3 |
| Costa Rica | 2 | 0 | 2 | 0 | 2 | 2 | 0 | 2 |
| Canada | 2 | 0 | 1 | 1 | 4 | 5 | –1 | 1 |

| 25 August | United States | 3–2 | Canada |
| 27 August | Canada | 2–2 | Costa Rica |
| 29 August | United States | 0–0 | Costa Rica |

=== Group B ===
Estadio Doroteo Guamuch Flores, Guatemala City

| Teams | Pld | W | D | L | GF | GA | GD | Pts |
|---|---|---|---|---|---|---|---|---|
| Honduras | 2 | 2 | 0 | 0 | 5 | 1 | +4 | 4 |
| Guatemala | 2 | 1 | 0 | 1 | 1 | 3 | –2 | 2 |
| El Salvador | 2 | 0 | 0 | 2 | 1 | 3 | –2 | 0 |

| 25 August | Guatemala | 0–3 | Honduras |
| 27 August | Honduras | 2–1 | El Salvador |
| 29 August | Guatemala | 1–0 | El Salvador |

== Semifinals ==
1 September 1982

| United States | 3 – 1 | Guatemala |

Estadio Doroteo Guamuch Flores, Guatemala City
1 September 1982

| Honduras | 1 – 0 | Costa Rica |

Estadio Doroteo Guamuch Flores, Guatemala City

== Third place match ==
5 September 1982

| Costa Rica | 3 – 2 | Guatemala |

Estadio Doroteo Guamuch Flores, Guatemala City

== Final ==
5 September 1982

| Honduras | 1 – 0 | United States |

Estadio Doroteo Guamuch Flores, Guatemala City

1982 CONCACAF U-20 Championship

Honduras
First title

== Qualification to World Youth Championship ==
Two teams qualified directly for the 1983 FIFA World Youth Championship.

- Mexico (host)
- United States (losing finalists, replacing Honduras who were disqualified)

The third placed Costa Rica had to play an additional intercontinental qualification in 1983, but failed to qualify. All matches were played in Costa Rica and Australia qualified for the World Youth Championship.

| Teams | Pld | W | D | L | GF | GA | GD | Pts |
|---|---|---|---|---|---|---|---|---|
| Australia | 4 | 4 | 0 | 0 | 11 | 3 | +8 | 8 |
| Israel | 4 | 1 | 1 | 2 | 4 | 6 | –2 | 3 |
| Costa Rica | 4 | 0 | 1 | 3 | 1 | 8 | –7 | 1 |

| 26 January | Australia | 3–1 | Israel |
| 28 January | Israel | 2–0 | Costa Rica |
| 30 January | Costa Rica | 1–3 | Australia |
| 1 February | Israel | 1–2 | Australia |
| 3 February | Australia | 3–0 | Costa Rica |
| 3 February | Israel | 0–0 | Costa Rica |
