= Matthew Berkeley =

English footballer (born 1987)

- Berkeley playing for Hyde

Personal information
- Full name: Matthew Anthony Berkeley
- Date of birth: 3 August 1987 (age 39)
- Place of birth: Manchester, England
- Position: Forward

Senior career*
Years	Team	Apps	(Gls)
2004–2007	Gretna	16	(2)
2006	→ Workington (loan)	9	(4)
2007	Altrincham	2	(0)
2007	Workington	27	(11)
2008	Droylsden	0	(0)
2008	Leigh Genesis	12	(0)
2008	Mossley	4	(0)
2008–2009	Hyde United	1	(0)
2009–2011	The New Saints	63	(13)
2011–2012	Hyde	20	(7)
2012	Workington	6	(0)
2012–?	Colwyn Bay	11	(2)
2013	Droylsden		
2013–?	Stafford Town		
2014	Stafford Rangers		

International career^{‡}
- Saint Kitts and Nevis U20
2011	Saint Kitts and Nevis	2	(0)
- * Club domestic league appearances and goals as of 06:55, 7 March 2012 (UTC) ‡ National team caps and goals as of 13 November 2011

Matthew Anthony Berkeley (born 3 August 1987) is a footballer who plays as a forward. Born in England, he made two appearances for the Saint Kitts and Nevis national team in 2011.

== Club career ==
Born in Manchester, Berkeley began his career with Gretna. He spent nine games on loan at Conference North side Workington in 2006. He made his debut for Workington on 4 February 2006. He scored his first goals of the loan period, netting a hat-trick against Northwich Victoria at Borough Park on 18 February. It was announced before Workington's trip to Northwich on 23 March that he would return to Gretna to help their Scottish Cup campaign. He finished his loan spell by scoring the opening goal of the game, although Workington eventually lost 4–1. He was released by Gretna in 2007.

After his release, he joined Altrincham but was released in late September 2007 after only three games for the club.

On 4 October 2007, he re-signed for Workington. He scored his first goals since returning to the club on a permanent basis, scoring two in a 5–0 win over Stalybridge in the FA Cup third qualifying round on 13 October. He moved to Droylsden on 22 June 2008 to join up with manager David Pace, But a month later he joined Leigh Genesis. After a change in management in late October 2008, he left Leigh and joined up with joined up with Mossley before signing for Hyde United the following month.

Berkeley then signed for Welsh Premier League side The New Saints in the 2009 January transfer window and went on to score 3 goals in 13 games in his first season.

He re-joined Hyde in August 2011 after a successful trial. He made his debut for Hyde in a 2–1 opening day win against Worcester City.

In March 2012 he re-joined Workington.

He signed for Colwyn Bay in June 2012. In February 2013 he re-joined Droylsden .

He joined Stafford Town F.C in 2013 but later left to join Stafford Rangers in January 2014.

== International career ==
At the youth level he played in the 2007 CONCACAF U-20 Championship, scoring against Costa Rica and Jamaica.

In September 2011 he was called up to the Saint Kitts and Nevis national team for their 2014 FIFA World Cup qualifiers against St Lucia and Puerto Rico. He made his debut in November 2011 against Canada.
