= Charbel Wehbe (footballer) =

Dominican Republic footballer

Personal information
- Full name: Charbel Anthuan Wehbe González
- Date of birth: 8 May 2004 (age 22)
- Place of birth: Santo Domingo, Dominican Republic
- Height: 1.83 m (6 ft 0 in)
- Position: Right-back

Team information
- Current team: Castellón B
- Number: 20

Youth career
- –2022: Oviedo

Senior career*
Years	Team	Apps	(Gls)
2022–2025	Oviedo B	43	(1)
2024–2025	→ Mérida (loan)	2	(0)
2025	→ Llanera (loan)	16	(2)
2025–2026	Castellón B	28	(0)
2026-	Recreativo Huelva	0	(0)

International career^{‡}
2022	Dominican Republic U20	4	(0)
2024–	Dominican Republic	6	(0)
- * Club domestic league appearances and goals as of 7 May 2026 ‡ National team caps and goals as of 28 November 2025

Charbel Anthuan Wehbe González (born 8 May 2004) is a Dominican Republic football player who plays as a right-back for Spanish Segunda Federación club Castellón B and the Dominican Republic national team.

== International career ==
Wehbe made his debut for the senior Dominican Republic national team on 23 March 2024 in a friendly against Aruba.
