= 1978 CONCACAF U-20 Tournament =

Tournament details
- Host country: Honduras
- Dates: 26 November – 17 December
- Teams: 13
- Venue(s): •Estadio Nacional Chelato Uclés •Estadio Francisco Morazán

Final positions
- Champions: Mexico (6th title)
- Runners-up: Canada
- Third place: Honduras
- Fourth place: Costa Rica

The 1978 CONCACAF Under-20 Championship was held in Honduras. It also served as qualification for the 1979 FIFA World Youth Championship.

== Teams ==
The following teams entered the tournament:

Region	Team(s)
Caribbean (CFU)	Bermuda; Dominican Republic; Grenada; Haiti; Netherlands Antilles; Puerto Rico; Trinidad and Tobago
Central America (UNCAF)	Costa Rica; El Salvador; Honduras (host)
North America (NAFU)	Canada; Mexico; United States

== Round 1 ==
=== Group A ===
Estadio Nacional Chelato Uclés, Tegucigalpa, Tegucigalpa

Teams	Pld	W	D	L	GF	GA	GD	Pts
Honduras	2	2	0	0	7	0	+7	4
Canada	2	1	0	1	9	2	+7	2
Dominican Republic	2	0	0	2	0	14	–14	0

26 November	Canada	9–0	Dominican Republic
30 November	Honduras	5–0	Dominican Republic
3 December	Honduras	2–0	Canada

=== Group B ===
Estadio Nacional Chelato Uclés, Tegucigalpa

Teams	Pld	W	D	L	GF	GA	GD	Pts
United States	2	2	0	0	6	0	+6	4
Trinidad and Tobago	2	1	0	1	2	5	–3	2
Puerto Rico	2	0	0	2	1	4	–3	0

28 November	United States	2–0	Puerto Rico
1 December	United States	4–0	Trinidad and Tobago
4 December	Puerto Rico	1–2	Trinidad and Tobago

=== Group C ===
Estadio Francisco Morazán, San Pedro Sula

Teams	Pld	W	D	L	GF	GA	GD	Pts
Mexico	3	3	0	0	14	0	+14	6
El Salvador	3	2	0	1	5	2	+3	4
Netherlands Antilles	3	1	0	2	3	9	–6	2
Grenada	3	0	0	3	2	13	–11	0

26 November	Mexico	7–0	Grenada
27 November	El Salvador	2–0	Netherlands Antilles
30 November	Netherlands Antilles	3–2	Grenada
	El Salvador	0–2	Mexico
3 December	El Salvador	3–0	Grenada
	Mexico	5–0	Netherlands Antilles

=== Group D ===
Estadio Francisco Morazán, San Pedro Sula

Teams	Pld	W	D	L	GF	GA	GD	Pts
Costa Rica	2	2	0	0	5	2	+3	4
Haiti	2	1	0	1	2	2	0	2
Bermuda	2	0	0	2	3	6	–3	0

28 November	Haiti	2–1	Bermuda
1 December	Costa Rica	4–2	Bermuda
4 December	Costa Rica	1–0	Haiti

== Round 2 ==
=== Group A ===
Estadio Nacional Chelato Uclés, Tegucigalpa

Teams	Pld	W	D	L	GF	GA	GD	Pts
Honduras	3	3	0	0	5	0	+5	6
Canada	3	1	1	1	3	1	+2	3
Trinidad and Tobago	3	1	0	2	3	7	–4	2
United States	3	0	1	2	1	4	–3	1

7 December	Canada	0–0	United States
	Honduras	3–0	Trinidad and Tobago
10 December	Canada	0–1	Honduras
	United States	1–3	Trinidad and Tobago
12 December	Canada	3–0	Trinidad and Tobago
	Honduras	1–0	United States

=== Group B ===
Estadio Francisco Morazán, San Pedro Sula

Teams	Pld	W	D	L	GF	GA	GD	Pts
Costa Rica	3	2	1	0	7	2	+5	5
Mexico	3	2	0	1	5	4	+1	4
El Salvador	3	1	1	1	6	4	+2	3
Haiti	3	0	0	3	0	8	–8	0

7 December	Costa Rica	1–1	El Salvador
	Mexico	1–0	Haiti
10 December	El Salvador	1–3	Mexico
	Costa Rica	3–0	Haiti
12 December	El Salvador	4–0	Haiti
	Costa Rica	3–1	Mexico

== Semifinals ==
14 December 1978

Mexico	2 – 0	Honduras

Estadio Nacional Chelato Uclés, Tegucigalpa

14 December 1978

Canada	4 – 0	Costa Rica

Estadio Francisco Morazán, San Pedro Sula

== Third place match ==
17 December 1978

Honduras	2 – 1	Costa Rica

Estadio Nacional Chelato Uclés, Tegucigalpa

== Final ==
17 December 1978

Mexico	1 – 0	Canada

Estadio Nacional Chelato Uclés, Tegucigalpa

1978 CONCACAF U-20 Championship

Mexico
Sixth title

== Qualification to World Youth Championship ==
The two best performing teams qualified for the 1979 FIFA World Youth Championship.

- Canada
- Mexico
