= Nicaragua national under-20 football team =

Nicaragua Under 20
- Nickname(s): Los Pinoleros, Albiazules
- Association: Nicaraguan Football Federation
- Confederation: CONCACAF (North America)
- Head coach: Jaime Ruiz
- FIFA code: NCA
First colours	Second colours

First international
- Costa Rica 1 - 5 Nicaragua (Panama City, Panama; March 5, 1962)

Biggest win
- Nicaragua 8 - 0 U.S. Virgin Islands (Managua, Nicaragua; February 15, 2020)

Biggest defeat
- El Salvador 8 - 0 Nicaragua (Guatemala City, Guatemala; August 17, 1982); Costa Rica 8 - 0 Nicaragua (Guatemala City, Guatemala; August 19, 1982) Records for competitive matches only.

The Nicaragua national under-20 football team, more commonly known as La Azulita, is controlled by Nicaraguan Football Federation and represents Nicaragua in international Under 20 or youth football competitions.

== Competitive record ==
=== FIFA U-20 World Cup Record ===
Year	Round	GP	W	D*	L	GS	GA
(Tunisia) 1977	Did not qualify						
(Japan) 1979	Did not qualify						
(Australia) 1981	Did not qualify						
(Mexico) 1983	Did not qualify						
(Soviet Union) 1985	Did not qualify						
(Chile) 1987	Did not qualify						
(Saudi Arabia) 1989	Did not qualify						
(Portugal) 1991	Did not qualify						
(Australia) 1993	Did not qualify						
(Qatar) 1995	Did not qualify						
(Malaysia) 1997	Did not qualify						
(Nigeria) 1999	Did not qualify						
(Argentina) 2001	Did not qualify						
(United Arab Emirates) 2003	Did not qualify						
(Netherlands) 2005	Did not qualify						
(Canada) 2007	Did not qualify						
(Egypt) 2009	Did not qualify						
(Colombia) 2011	Did not qualify						
(Turkey) 2013	Did not qualify						
(New Zealand) 2015	Did not qualify						
(South Korea) 2017	Did not qualify						
(Poland) 2019	Did not qualify						
(Indonesia) 2021	Cancelled						
(Argentina) 2023	Did not qualify						
(Chile) 2025	Did not qualify						
(Azerbaijan) (Uzbekistan) 2027	To be determined						
Total	0/25	0	0	0	0	0	0

=== UNCAF preliminary round ===
Year	Position	GP	W	D*	L	GS	GA	
1995	0	0	0	0	0	8	1	Withdrew
1998	0	0	0	0	0	0	0	Withdrew
(Panama) 2001	4/4	3	1	0	2	4	8	Did not qualify
2003	5/5	4	0	1	3	3	18	Did not qualify
2005	5/5	4	0	0	4	3	11	Did not qualify
2007	3/3	2	0	0	2	4	11	Did not qualify
(Honduras) / (Guatemala) 2009	3/3	2	0	0	2	0	11	Did not qualify
(Panama) / (Honduras) 2011	3/3	2	0	0	2	0	5	
(Honduras) / (Guatemala) 2013	2/3	2	1	0	1	3	3	Qualified
	7/9	19	2	1	16	17	67	

=== CONCACAF Under-20 Championship ===
Year	Round	GP	W	D*	L	GS	GA
(Panama) 1962	Round 1	4	0	2	2	2	12
(Guatemala) 1964	Round 1	4	0	2	2	1	7
(Cuba) 1970	Did not participate						
(Mexico) 1973	Round 1	2	0	1	1	1	8
(Canada) 1974	Round 1	3	1	0	2	3	5
(Puerto Rico) 1976	Second round	5	1	1	3	4	12
(Honduras) 1978	Did not participate						
(United States) 1980	Did not participate						
(Guatemala) 1982	Round 1	3	0	0	3	1	18
(Trinidad and Tobago) 1984	Did not participate						
(Trinidad and Tobago) 1986	Did not participate						
(Guatemala) 1988	Did not participate						
(Guatemala) 1990	Did not participate						
(Canada) 1992	Did not participate						
(Honduras) 1994	Round 1	2	0	0	2	1	8
(Mexico) 1996	Round 1	3	0	0	3	1	12
(Guatemala) (Trinidad and Tobago) 1998	Did not qualify						
(Canada) (Trinidad and Tobago) 2001	Did not qualify						
(Panama) (United States) 2003	Did not qualify						
(United States) (Honduras) 2005	Did not qualify						
(Panama) (Mexico) 2007	Did not qualify						
(Trinidad and Tobago) 2009	Did not qualify						
(Guatemala) 2011	Did not qualify						
(Mexico) 2013	Round 1	2	0	0	2	1	8
Total	1 Round 2	28	2	6	20	16	90

== Current squad ==
- The following players were called up for the 2022 CONCACAF U-20 Championship.
- Match dates: 18 June – 3 July 2022
- Caps and goals correct as of: 25 June 2022
- Names in italics denote players who have been capped for the senior team.

No.	Pos.	Player	Date of birth (age)	Caps	Goals	Club
	GK	Miguel Rodríguez	13 June 2003 (age 22)	3	0	(Nicaraguan Football Federation) Deportivo Ocotal
	GK	César Salandía	13 June 2004 (age 21)	0	0	(Nicaraguan Football Federation) Real Estelí
	DF	Cristhian Herrera	22 March 2004 (age 21)	3	0	(Nicaraguan Football Federation) Real Estelí
	DF	Jermar López	26 September 2003 (age 22)	1	0	Unknown
	DF	Dylan Pineda	3 May 2004 (age 21)	3	0	(Nicaraguan Football Federation) Diriangén
	DF	Joel Soto	11 March 2003 (age 22)	3	0	(Nicaraguan Football Federation) Diriangén
	DF	Kurt Thomas	21 August 2003 (age 22)	3	0	(Nicaraguan Football Federation) Juventus
	MF	Keylon Batiz	1 February 2004 (age 22)	3	3	(Nicaraguan Football Federation) Real Estelí
	MF	Joarlyn Caldera	15 August 2004 (age 21)	0	0	(Nicaraguan Football Federation) Real Estelí
	MF	Fredman Kirklan	9 October 2004 (age 21)	0	0	(Nicaraguan Football Federation) Real Estelí
	MF	Freddy Ortiz	22 November 2005 (age 20)	0	0	(Swiss Football Association) Servette
	MF	José Israel Reyes	22 January 2003 (age 23)	0	0	(Costa Rican Football Federation) Guadalupe
	MF	Osmin Salinas	3 February 2004 (age 22)	3	0	(Nicaraguan Football Federation) Real Estelí
	MF	Óscar Soto	5 March 2003 (age 22)	3	0	(Nicaraguan Football Federation) Managua
	MF	Widman Talavera	12 January 2003 (age 23)	3	3	(Nicaraguan Football Federation) Real Estelí
	FW	Jareck Cáceres	10 January 2003 (age 23)	3	3	(Nicaraguan Football Federation) UNAN Managua
	FW	Manuel Gutiérrez	14 August 2003 (age 22)	2	2	Free agent
	FW	Carlos Pérez	9 October 2003 (age 22)	0	0	(Costa Rican Football Federation) San Carlos
	FW	Ocnarpz Rodríguez	22 September 2004 (age 21)	2	0	(Nicaraguan Football Federation) Real Estelí
	FW	Anyelo Velásquez	22 December 2004 (age 21)	0	0	(Nicaraguan Football Federation) Diriangén

== Current technical staff ==
- Head coach: (Nicaragua) Jaime Ruiz
- Assistant coach: (Nicaragua) Tyron Acevedo
- Goalkeeper coach: (Nicaragua) Carlos Mendieta
- Doctor: (Nicaragua) Curpertino Borrell
