= Oliver Schmidhauser =

Dominican footballer (born 2004)

Personal information
- Full name: Oliver Schmidhauser de la Cruz
- Date of birth: 2 June 2004 (age 22)
- Place of birth: St. Gallen, Switzerland
- Height: 1.88 m (6 ft 2 in)
- Position: Striker

Team information
- Current team: RSV Eintracht
- Number: 26

Youth career
- 2013–2015: St. Gallen
- 2015–2017: Hertha Zehlendorf
- 2017–2019: SpVgg Unterhaching
- 2019–2022: Vaduz
- 2022: Greuther Fürth
- 2022–2023: RB Leipzig

Senior career*
Years	Team	Apps	(Gls)
2023	FK Austria Wien	0	(0)
2024	Winterthur	3	(0)
2024–2025	Hertha BSC II	9	(0)
2026–	RSV Eintracht	1	(0)

International career^{‡}
2022	Switzerland U19	1	(0)
2023	Dominican Republic U20	4	(0)
2024–	Dominican Republic U23	5	(3)
- * Club domestic league appearances and goals as of 23 September 2026 ‡ National team caps and goals as of 23 March 2024

Oliver Schmidhauser de la Cruz (born 2 June 2004) is a professional footballer who played as a Striker for RSV Eintracht in the German Regionalliga Nordost. striker. Born in Switzerland, he represents Dominican Republic at youth international level.

== Early life ==
Schmidhauser is a native of St. Gallen, Switzerland, and joined the youth academy of Liechtensteiner side Vaduz.

== Club career ==
In 2022, Schmidhauser joined the youth academy of German side RB Leipzig. Previously, he played for the youth academies of Liechtensteiner side Vaduz, SpVgg Unterhaching, and Hertha Zehlendorf. In 2023, he received interest from the youth academy of Italian Serie A side Inter.

== International career ==
Schmidhauser represented the Dominican Republic internationally at the 2023 FIFA U-20 World Cup.

== Style of play ==
Schmidhauser is known for physicality and speed.

== Personal life ==
Schmidhauser idolizes French international Karim Benzema.
