= César Salandía =

Nicaraguan footballer (born 2004)

Personal information
- Full name: César Renieri Salandía Paz
- Date of birth: 13 June 2004 (age 22)
- Place of birth: Managua, Nicaragua
- Height: 1.88 m (6 ft 2 in)
- Position: Goalkeeper

Team information
- Current team: Real Estelí
- Number: 25

Youth career
- 2020–2021: Real Estelí

Senior career*
Years	Team	Apps	(Gls)
2021–	Real Estelí	70	(0)

International career^{‡}
- Nicaragua U15
2020–2021	Nicaragua U17		
2022	Nicaragua U20	3+	(0)
2022–	Nicaragua	5	(0)
- * Club domestic league appearances and goals as of 21 July 2026 ‡ National team caps and goals as of 21 July 2026

César Renieri Salandía Paz (born 13 June 2004) is a Nicaraguan professional footballer who plays as a goalkeeper for Liga Primera club Real Estelí and the Nicaragua national team.

== Early life ==
Born in Managua, Nicaragua, Salandía moved to Danlí at the age of two, and lived there before returning to Nicaragua at the age of ten.

== Club career ==
Salandía joined Real Estelí in 2020, and made his debut for the club on 6 October 2021, during a match against Walter Ferretti. In July 2023, it was reported that he had agreed to join Honduran club Real España, but a transfer failed to materialize.

== International career ==
Salandía has represented Nicaragua at various levels, including the under-15s, under-17s, and under-20s. He was first called up to the Nicaragua national team in September 2022, and made his debut on 22 September, in a 2–1 defeat against Suriname.

== Personal life ==
Born to a Honduran father from Danlí and Nicaraguan mother, Salandía is of Honduran descent. His father also played football for Estrella Roja de Danlí, before later playing in Nicaragua.
