= Lisandro Trenidad =

Curaçao footballer (born 1991)

Personal information
- Full name: Lisandro Bernadino Trenidad
- Date of birth: 20 May 1991 (age 35)
- Place of birth: Willemstad, Netherlands Antilles
- Position: Forward

Team information
- Current team: Hubentut Fortuna

Senior career*
Years	Team	Apps	(Gls)
2008–	Hubentut Fortuna	78	(57)

International career
?	Netherlands Antilles	5	(4)
- * Club domestic league appearances and goals

Lisandro Bernadino Trenidad (born 20 May 1991) is a footballer from Curaçao who plays as a forward for Hubentut Fortuna.

== Teams ==
- Hubentut Fortuna
