= 1962 CONCACAF Youth Tournament =

Tournament details
- Host country: Panama
- City: Panama City
- Dates: March 4–18
- Teams: 9 (from 1 confederation)
- Venue: Estadio Juan Demóstenes Arosemena

Final positions
- Champions: Mexico (1st title)
- Runners-up: Guatemala
- Third place: Netherlands Antilles
- Fourth place: Costa Rica

Tournament statistics
- Matches played: 20
- Goals scored: 65 (3.25 per match)
- Top scorer(s): (Mexico) Javier Fragoso (9 goals)

The 1962 CONCACAF Youth Tournament was the first international association football championship tournament for youth national teams in the CONCACAF region, North and Central America and the Caribbean. This tournament is the forerunner of the current CONCACAF Under-20 Championship. The tournament took place Estadio Juan Demóstenes Arosemena in Panama City, Panama and was won by Mexico.

== Teams ==
The following teams entered the tournament:

Region	Team(s)
Caribbean (CFU)	Haiti; Netherlands Antilles
Central America (UNCAF)	Costa Rica; El Salvador; Guatemala; Honduras; Nicaragua; Panama (host)
North America (NAFU)	Mexico

== First round ==
=== Group A ===
Pos	Team	Pld	W	D	L	GF	GA	GD	Pts	Qualification or relegation
1	Netherlands Antilles	3	1	2	0	4	3	+1	4	Advance to Final Round
2	Guatemala	3	1	1	1	4	4	0	3	Advance to Final Round
3	Panama	3	1	1	1	3	3	0	3	
4	El Salvador	3	0	2	1	2	3	−1	2	

Updated to match(es) played on 10 March 1962. Source: RSSSF
Rules for classification: 1) points; 2) goal difference; 3) number of goals scored.
March 4, 1962

Panama	1 – 2	Guatemala

Panama City
March 6, 1962

Netherlands Antilles	1 – 1	El Salvador

Panama City

March 8, 1962

Netherlands Antilles	2 – 1	Guatemala

Panama City
March 8, 1962

Panama	1 – 0	El Salvador

Panama City

March 10, 1962

Guatemala	1 – 1	El Salvador

Panama City
March 10, 1962

Panama	1 – 1	Netherlands Antilles

Panama City

=== Group B ===
Pos	Team	Pld	W	D	L	GF	GA	GD	Pts	Qualification or relegation
1	Mexico	4	3	1	0	15	2	+13	7	Advance to Final Round
2	Costa Rica	4	2	1	1	15	5	+10	5	Advance to Final Round
3	Honduras	3	1	1	1	3	4	−1	3	
4	Nicaragua	4	0	2	2	2	12	−10	2	
5	Haiti	3	0	1	2	2	14	−12	1	

Updated to match(es) played on 12 March 1962. Source: RSSSF
Rules for classification: 1) points; 2) goal difference; 3) number of goals scored.
March 5, 1962

Costa Rica	5 – 1	Nicaragua

Panama City
March 5, 1962

Mexico	5 – 0	Haiti

Panama City

March 7, 1962

Haiti	1 – 1	Nicaragua

Panama City
March 7, 1962

Honduras	2 – 1	Costa Rica

Panama City

March 9, 1962

Honduras	0 – 0	Nicaragua

Panama City

March 11, 1962

Mexico	3 – 1	Honduras

Panama City
March 11, 1962

Costa Rica	8 – 1	Haiti

Panama City

March 12, 1962

Mexico	6 – 0	Nicaragua

Panama City

Mexico	1 – 1	Costa Rica

Panama City

== Final round ==
Pos	Team	Pld	W	D	L	GF	GA	GD	Pts	Qualification or relegation
1	Mexico	3	1	2	0	4	3	+1	4	1962 CONCACAF Youth Tournament winners
2	Guatemala	3	1	1	1	4	3	+1	3	
3	Netherlands Antilles	3	1	1	1	3	4	−1	3	
4	Costa Rica	3	1	0	2	4	5	−1	2	

Updated to match(es) played on 18 March 1962. Source: RSSSF
Rules for classification: 1) points; 2) goal difference; 3) number of goals scored.
March 14, 1962

Guatemala	1 – 1	Mexico

Panama City
March 14, 1962

Netherlands Antilles	2 – 1	Costa Rica

Panama City

March 16, 1962

Costa Rica	2 – 1	Guatemala

Panama City
March 16, 1962

Netherlands Antilles	1 – 1	Mexico

Panama City

March 18, 1962

Guatemala	2 – 0	Netherlands Antilles

Panama City
March 18, 1962

Mexico	2 – 1	Costa Rica

Panama City

== Results ==
1962 CONCACAF Youth champions

Mexico
First title

== See also ==
- CONCACAF Under-20 Championship
