= 1973 CONCACAF Youth Tournament =

Tournament details
- Host country: Mexico
- Dates: 18 February – 4 March
- Teams: 6

Final positions
- Champions: Mexico (3rd title)
- Runners-up: Guatemala
- Third place: Cuba
- Fourth place: Canada

The 1973 CONCACAF Youth Tournament was held in Mexico.

== Teams ==
The following teams entered the tournament:

Region	Team(s)
Caribbean (CFU)	Cuba; Netherlands Antilles
Central America (UNCAF)	Guatemala; Nicaragua
North America (NAFU)	Canada; Mexico (host)

== Group stage ==
=== Group 1 ===
Teams	Pld	W	D	L	GF	GA	GD	Pts
Mexico	2	2	0	0	9	1	+8	4
Canada	2	0	1	1	2	3	–1	1
Nicaragua	2	0	1	1	1	8	–7	1

18 February	Mexico	7–0	Nicaragua	Estadio Cuauhtémoc, Puebla
20 February	Nicaragua	1–1	Canada	Estadio Cuauhtémoc, Puebla
22 February	Mexico	2–1	Canada	Estadio Cuauhtémoc, Puebla

=== Group 2 ===
Teams	Pld	W	D	L	GF	GA	GD	Pts
Guatemala	2	1	1	0	4	1	+3	3
Cuba	2	1	1	0	1	0	+1	3
Netherlands Antilles	2	0	0	2	1	5	–4	0

19 February	Guatemala	4–1	Netherlands Antilles	Estadio León, León
21 February	Netherlands Antilles	0–1	Cuba	Estadio León, León
23 February	Guatemala	0–0	Cuba	Estadio León, León

== Semifinals ==
25 February 1973

Guatemala	1 – 0	Canada

Estadio Nemesio Díez, Toluca
25 February 1973

Mexico	1 – 0	Cuba

Estadio Nemesio Díez, Toluca

== Third place match ==
28 February 1973

Cuba	2 – 0	Canada

Estadio Cuauhtémoc, Puebla

== Final ==
4 March 1973

Mexico	2 – 0	Guatemala

Estadio Cuauhtémoc, Puebla

1973 CONCACAF Youth Championship

Mexico
Third title
