= 2007 U-20 World Cup CONCACAF qualifying tournament =

2007 CONCACAF U-20 Qualification

Tournament details
- Host countries: Panama; Mexico
- Dates: January 7 – February 25
- Teams: 8 (from 1 confederation)
- Venue: 2 (in 2 host cities)

Tournament statistics
- Matches played: 12
- Goals scored: 34 (2.83 per match)
- Attendance: 96,571 (8,048 per match)
- Top scorer(s): (United States) Andre Akpan (3 goals) (Costa Rica) Jean Carlos Solórzano
- All statistics correct as of March 18, 2009.

The 2007 CONCACAF U-20 Qualifying Tournament was held to determine the four CONCACAF entrants into the 2007 FIFA U-20 World Cup, which was hosted by Canada. The tournament final was held in two groups of four with the top two from each group advancing. Group A was held in Panama and Group B was held in Mexico. On January 21, 2007, the United States and Panama qualified to the U-20 World Cup. On February 23, 2007, Mexico and Costa Rica achieved qualification as well.

== Qualification ==
The following teams qualified for the tournament:

Region	Qualification	Qualifiers
Caribbean (CFU)	Caribbean qualifying	Haiti; Jamaica; Saint Kitts and Nevis
Central America (UNCAF)	Central American qualifying	Costa Rica; Guatemala
Central America (UNCAF)	host	Panama
North America (NAFU)	host	Mexico
North America (NAFU)	automatically qualified	United States

== Group A ==
Panama hosted Group A. All of the matches were played at Estadio Rommel Fernández in Panama City between January 17–21.

Team	Pld	W	D	L	GF	GA	GD	Pts
United States	3	2	1	0	9	1	+8	7
Panama	3	1	1	1	4	8	−4	4
Haiti	3	1	0	2	5	7	−2	3
Guatemala	3	0	2	1	1	3	−2	2

17 January 2007

Haiti	1 – 4	United States
Yveson 73' (pen.)	Report	Akpan 25' 38' 61'; Wallace 48'

Estadio Rommel Fernández, Panama City
Attendance: 6,000
Referee: Lee Davis (Trinidad and Tobago)
17 January 2007

Panama	1 – 1	Guatemala
Barahona 65'	Report	Ovalle 2' (o.g.)

Estadio Rommel Fernández, Panama City
Attendance: 7,545
Referee: Manuel Glower (Mexico)

19 January 2007

United States	0 – 0	Guatemala
	Report

Estadio Rommel Fernández, Panama City
Attendance: 3,000
Referee: José Pineda (Honduras)
19 January 2007

Panama	3 – 2	Haiti
Wallace 22'; Saintilus 72' (o.g.); Brown 83'	Report	Saintilus 60'; Yveson 77'

Estadio Rommel Fernández, Panama City
Attendance: 9,632
Referee: Joel Aguilar (El Salvador)

21 January 2007

Guatemala	0 – 2	Haiti
	Report	Augustin 52' 83'

Estadio Rommel Fernández, Panama City
Attendance: 3,000
Referee: Roy McArthur (Guyana)
21 January 2007

Panama	0 – 5	United States
	Report	Adu 7' 90'; Rogers 49'; Smith 60'; Villanueva 70'

Estadio Rommel Fernández, Panama City
Attendance: 17,180
Referee: Joel Aguilar (El Salvador)

== Group B ==
Mexico hosted Group B. All of the matches were played at Estadio Banorte in Culiacán, Sinaloa between February 21–25.

Team	Pld	W	D	L	GF	GA	GD	Pts
Mexico	3	2	1	0	5	1	+4	7
Costa Rica	3	2	1	0	6	3	+3	7
Saint Kitts and Nevis	3	0	1	2	3	6	−3	1
Jamaica	3	0	1	2	1	5	−4	1

21 February 2007

Jamaica	0 – 2	Costa Rica
	Report	Borges 3' (pen.); Solórzano 90+'

Estadio Banorte, Culiacán, Sinaloa
Attendance: 250
Referee: Terry Vaughn (United States)
21 February 2007

Mexico	2 – 0	Saint Kitts and Nevis
Villaluz 28' dos Santos 86'	Report

Estadio Banorte, Culiacán, Sinaloa
Attendance: 12,833
Referee: Steven Depiero (Canada)

23 February 2007

Costa Rica	3 – 2	Saint Kitts and Nevis
Cordero 5'; Solórzano 43'; Herrera 55'	Report	Berkeley 2'; Hanley 14'

Estadio Banorte, Culiacán, Sinaloa
Attendance: 250
Referee: Elmar Rodas (Guatemala)
23 February 2007

Mexico	2 – 0	Jamaica
Villaluz 31' dos Santos 56'	Report

Estadio Banorte, Culiacán, Sinaloa
Attendance: 17,425
Referee: Roberto Moreno (Panama)

25 February 2007

Saint Kitts and Nevis	1 – 1	Jamaica
Berkeley 77'	Report	Grant 36'

Estadio Banorte, Culiacán, Sinaloa
Attendance: 405
Referee: Steven Depiero (Canada)
25 February 2007

Mexico	1 – 1	Costa Rica
Esqueda 70'	Report	Solórzano 6'

Estadio Banorte, Culiacán, Sinaloa
Attendance: 19,051
Referee: Neal Brizan (Trinidad and Tobago)

== See also ==
- 2007 U-20 World Cup CONCACAF qualifying tournament qualifying
- CONCACAF Under-20 Championship
- 2007 FIFA U-20 World Cup
