= Guatemala national under-20 football team =

Guatemala U-20 national team
- Nickname(s): La Azul y Blanco (The Blue and White)
- Association: Federación Nacional de Fútbol de Guatemala
- Confederation: CONCACAF
- Head coach: Marvin Cabrera
- Captain: Jonathan Franco
- Home stadium: Estadio Doroteo Guamuch Flores
- FIFA code: GUA
First colours	Second colours

FIFA U-20 World Cup
- Appearances: 2 (first in 2011)
- Best result: Round of 16 (2011)

CONCACAF Under-20 Championship
- Appearances: 20 (first in 1962)
- Best result: Runner-ups (1962, 1973)

The Guatemala national Under-20 football team is the national under-20 age level football team of Guatemala, and represents the nation in under-20 international matches.

The team has qualified to the FIFA U-20 World Cup twice, in 2011 and 2023. It finished in the top 4 of the CONCACAF region at the 2011 CONCACAF U-20 Championship, earning the first participation in a World Cup finals tournament at any level for Guatemala.

== History ==
At the 2011 CONCACAF U-20 Championship held in Guatemala City in March and April 2011, Guatemala advanced to the second round as second of a 3-team series which included Honduras and Jamaica. Guatemala then played a direct elimination quarterfinal match against the United States, and won 2-1 which secured a place in the top four and thus participation in the 2011 U-20 World Cup. The result was considered a significant upset by the international news media as the United States was one of the strongest teams in CONCACAF.

=== 2011 U-20 World Cup ===
Guatemala was drawn into Group D of the tournament along Nigeria, Croatia, and Saudi Arabia. Their debut match was a 0–5 loss against Nigeria. Following a 6–0 loss to Saudi Arabia, Guatemala defeated Croatia 1–0 to advance to the Round of 16, where they were eliminated by losing 0–1 to Portugal.

=== 2023 U-20 World Cup ===
Groups were drawn for the 2023 FIFA U-20 World Cup in April 2023, and Guatemala was placed in Group A alongside New Zealand, Uzbekistan, and Argentina. Guatemala's first match was a 1–0 loss to New Zealand, followed by a 3–0 loss to Argentina. In their final match of the group stage, Uzbekistan defeated Guatemala 2–0, which resulted in Guatemala's elimination from the tournament.

== Results and fixtures ==
The following is a list of match results in the last 12 months, as well as any future matches that have been scheduled.

== Current squad ==
- The following players were called up for the 2023 FIFA U-20 World Cup.
- Match dates: 20–26 May 2023
- Caps and goals correct as of: June 26, 2022 after the match against Canada U20.
- Names in italics denote players who have been capped for the senior team.

No.	Pos.	Player	Date of birth (age)	Caps	Goals	Club
	GK	Fausto Delgado	23 September 2005 (age 21)	0	0	(National Football Federation of Guatemala) Global Soccer Academy
	GK	Jorge Moreno	28 December 2004 (age 21)	3	0	(National Football Federation of Guatemala) Comunicaciones
	GK	David Aldana	24 April 2003 (age 23)	0	0	(National Football Federation of Guatemala) Municipal
	DF	Andy Dominguez	18 February 2003 (age 23)	0	0	(National Football Federation of Guatemala) Comunicaciones
	DF	Emerson Raymundo	21 April 2003 (age 23)	0	0	(National Football Federation of Guatemala) Suchitepéquez
	DF	Jonathan Franco	26 July 2003 (age 23)	4	0	(National Football Federation of Guatemala) Municipal
	DF	Mathius Gaitán	31 January 2003 (age 23)	3	0	(National Football Federation of Guatemala) Municipal
	DF	Arian Recinos	3 February 2005 (age 21)	3	0	(United States Soccer Federation) New York Red Bulls
	DF	Jeshua Urizar	19 October 2004 (age 22)	4	0	(National Football Federation of Guatemala) Mixco
	MF	Daniel Cardoza	15 March 2004 (age 22)	3	0	(National Football Federation of Guatemala) Comunicaciones
	MF	Néstor Cabrera	12 November 2003 (age 23)	4	0	(United States Soccer Federation) Queensboro FC
	MF	Randall Corado	1 September 2004 (age 22)	4	0	(National Football Federation of Guatemala) Municipal
	MF	Edy Palencia	6 January 2004 (age 22)	4	0	(National Football Federation of Guatemala) Comunicaciones
	MF	Allan Juárez	2 February 2004 (age 22)	3	2	(United States Soccer Federation) San Jose Earthquakes
	MF	Figo Montaño	7 April 2004 (age 22)	4	0	(National Football Federation of Guatemala) Municipal
	MF	Rudy Muñoz	6 February 2005 (age 21)	3	0	(National Football Federation of Guatemala) Municipal
	MF	José Espinoza	10 September 2003 (age 23)	0	0	(National Football Federation of Guatemala) Zacapa
	MF	Carlos Santos	5 August 2003 (age 23)	4	1	(National Football Federation of Guatemala) Iztapa
	FW	Jefry Bantes	8 March 2004 (age 22)	3	0	(National Football Federation of Guatemala) Municipal
	FW	Arquimides Ordóñez	5 August 2003 (age 23)	4	3	(United States Soccer Federation) FC Cincinnati
	FW	Anderson Villagrán	10 May 2003 (age 23)	2	1	(National Football Federation of Guatemala) Malacateco

== Competitive record ==
=== FIFA U-20 World Cup ===
Year	Round	GP	W	D*	L	GS	GA
(Tunisia) 1977	Did not qualify						
(Japan) 1979	Did not qualify						
(Australia) 1981	Did not qualify						
(Mexico) 1983	Did not qualify						
(Soviet Union) 1985	Did not qualify						
(Chile) 1987	Did not qualify						
(Saudi Arabia) 1989	Did not qualify						
(Portugal) 1991	Did not qualify						
(Australia) 1993	Did not qualify						
(Qatar) 1995	Did not qualify						
(Malaysia) 1997	Did not qualify						
(Nigeria) 1999	Did not qualify						
(Argentina) 2001	Did not qualify						
(United Arab Emirates) 2003	Did not qualify						
(Netherlands) 2005	Did not qualify						
(Canada) 2007	Did not qualify						
(Egypt) 2009	Did not qualify						
(Colombia) 2011	Round of 16	4	1	0	3	1	12
(Turkey) 2013	Did not qualify						
(New Zealand) 2015	Did not qualify						
(South Korea) 2017	Did not qualify						
(Poland) 2019	Did not qualify						
(Argentina) 2023	Group stage	3	0	0	3	0	6
(Chile) 2025	Did not qualify						
(Azerbaijan) (Uzbekistan) 2027	Did not qualify						
(Armenia) (Georgia (country)) 2029	To be determined						
Total	2/26	7	1	0	6	1	18

== Head-to-head record ==
The following table shows Guatemala's head-to-head record in the FIFA U-20 World Cup.

Opponent	Pld	W	D	L	GF	GA	GD	Win %
Argentina	1	0	0	1	0	3	−3	0.00
Croatia	1	1	0	0	1	0	+1	100.00
New Zealand	1	0	0	1	0	1	−1	0.00
Nigeria	1	0	0	1	0	5	−5	0.00
Portugal	1	0	0	1	0	1	−1	0.00
Saudi Arabia	1	0	0	1	0	6	−6	0.00
Uzbekistan	1	0	0	1	0	2	−2	0.00
Total	7	1	0	6	1	18	−17	14.29

== Current technical staff ==
- Head coach: Marvin Cabrera (Mexico)
- Assistant coach: Rigoberto Gómez (Guatemala)

== See also ==
- Guatemala national football team
- Guatemala national under-17 football team
