= Netherlands Antilles national under-20 football team =

Netherlands Antilles
- Association: Nederlands Antilliaanse; Voetbal Unie
- Confederation: CONCACAF (North America)
- Captain: Lisandro Trenidad
- FIFA code: ANT
First colours	Second colours

First international
- NA

Biggest win
- (Netherlands Antilles) Neth. Antilles 20 - 0 British Virgin Islands (Bonaire; November 7, 2010)

Netherlands Antilles national under-20 football team represented the former Netherlands Antilles in international football competitions such as FIFA U-20 World Cup and CONCACAF Caribbean Championship.

== Notable players ==
- (Curaçao) Lisandro Trenidad
- (Curaçao) Leandro Bacuna
- (Curaçao) Bryan Anastatia
- (Curaçao) Elson Hooi
- (Curaçao) Hubertson Pauletta
