= Trinidad and Tobago national under-20 football team =

The Trinidad and Tobago national under-20 football team is the under-20 youth team for the Trinidad and Tobago national football team.

== Current squad ==
- The following players were called up for the 2022 CONCACAF U-20 Championship.
- Match dates: 18 June – 3 July 2022
- Caps and goals correct as of: 19 June 2022
- Names in italics denote players who have been capped for the senior team.

No.	Pos.	Player	Date of birth (age)	Caps	Goals	Club
	GK	Tristan Edwards	7 July 2004 (age 21)	0	0	(United States Soccer Federation) Marian University Knights
	GK	Jaheim Wickham	26 February 2003 (age 23)	0	0	(Canadian Soccer Association) Toronto
	DF	Christian Bailey	14 May 2004 (age 21)	0	0	(Trinidad and Tobago Football Association) Defence Force
	DF	Josiah Cooper	29 July 2004 (age 21)	0	0	(Trinidad and Tobago Football Association) Club Sando
	DF	Jaheim Joseph	26 October 2003 (age 22)	0	0	(Trinidad and Tobago Football Association) Defence Force
	DF	Jaron Pascall	21 January 2004 (age 22)	0	0	(Trinidad and Tobago Football Association) Police
	DF	Noah Roka	28 November 2003 (age 22)	0	0	(Austrian Football Association) FC Stadlau
	DF	Isaiah Thompson	18 February 2004 (age 22)	0	0	(Trinidad and Tobago Football Association) Club Sando
	DF	Tyrik Trotman	21 January 2004 (age 22)	0	0	(United States Soccer Federation) Master University
	DF	Marvin Waldrop	20 January 2003 (age 23)	0	0	(Trinidad and Tobago Football Association) Club Sando
	MF	Micah Cain	10 April 2003 (age 22)	0	0	(German Football Association) TSV Meerbusch
	MF	Kassidy Davidson	13 September 2004 (age 21)	0	0	(United States Soccer Federation) Staten Island Athletic SC
	MF	Andrew De Gannes	9 April 2003 (age 22)	0	0	(United States Soccer Federation) St Louis City Reserves
	MF	Nathaniel James	17 June 2004 (age 21)	0	0	(Trinidad and Tobago Football Association) W Connection
	MF	Molik Khan	8 April 2004 (age 21)	0	0	(United States Soccer Federation) Minnesota United FC
	MF	Luke Phillip	21 August 2004 (age 21)	0	0	(Trinidad and Tobago Football Association) Point Fortin Civic
	MF	Kaihim Thomas	8 February 2003 (age 23)	0	0	(Trinidad and Tobago Football Association) La Horquetta Rangers
	FW	Real Gill	23 January 2003 (age 23)	0	0	(Trinidad and Tobago Football Association) La Horquetta Rangers
	FW	Tarik Lee	28 December 2003 (age 22)	0	0	(Trinidad and Tobago Football Association) W Connection
	FW	Josiah Wilson	12 September 2004 (age 21)	0	0	(Croatian Football Federation) NK(FC) Neretvanac Opuzen
