= 2022 CONCACAF U-20 Championship squads =

The 2022 CONCACAF U-20 Championship was an international football tournament held in Honduras from 18 June to 3 July 2022. The twenty participating national teams were required to register a squad of twenty players, of which two had to be goalkeepers.

The age listed for each player is on 18 June 2022, the first day of the tournament. The numbers of caps and goals listed for each player do not include any matches played after the start of the tournament. The club listed is the club for which the player last played a competitive match before the tournament. (Note: This is the club a player was last able to play for during the previous season in the event a player did not play a competitive match.) The nationality for each club reflects the national association (not the league) to which the club is affiliated. A flag is included for coaches who are of a different nationality than their own national team.

== Group stage ==
=== Group E ===
==== Canada ====
Coach: Mauro Biello

Canada's 20-man squad was announced on 10 June 2022.

No.	Pos.	Player	Date of birth (age)	Caps	Goals	Club
1	GK	Ben Alexander	27 June 2003 (aged 18)	4	0	(Canadian Soccer Association) Vancouver Whitecaps FC 2
18	GK	Dino Bontis	3 August 2004 (aged 17)	1	0	(Canadian Soccer Association) Forge FC
2	DF	Noah Abatneh	28 September 2004 (aged 17)	3	0	(Italian Football Federation) Lazio
6	DF	Matteo Campagna	27 June 2004 (aged 17)	6	0	(Canadian Soccer Association) Vancouver Whitecaps FC
12	DF	Jefferson Alphonse	12 June 2003 (aged 19)	5	0	(Canadian Soccer Association) CF Montréal Academy
15	DF	Keesean Ferdinand	17 August 2003 (aged 18)	4	0	(Canadian Soccer Association) CF Montréal U23
13	DF	Kobe Franklin	10 May 2003 (aged 19)	4	0	(Canadian Soccer Association) Toronto FC II
5	DF	Jamie Knight-Lebel	24 December 2004 (aged 17)	5	0	(The Football Association) Bristol City
3	DF	Kwasi Poku	6 February 2003 (aged 19)	5	0	(Canadian Soccer Association) Forge FC
4	DF	Justin Smith	4 February 2003 (aged 19)	6	0	(French Football Federation) Nice
10	MF	Matthew Catavolo	13 February 2003 (aged 19)	6	3	(Canadian Soccer Association) Valour FC
17	MF	Jessé Costa	28 April 2005 (aged 17)	4	1	(German Football Association) VfL Wolfsburg
16	MF	Maël Henry	26 May 2004 (aged 18)	5	1	(Canadian Soccer Association) CF Montréal Academy
14	MF	Gabriel Pellegrino	25 March 2004 (aged 18)	5	0	(German Football Association) SC Freiburg
8	MF	Rida Zouhir	23 November 2003 (aged 18)	4	0	(Canadian Soccer Association) CF Montréal
7	FW	Jean-Aniel Assi	12 August 2004 (aged 17)	3	0	(Canadian Soccer Association) Cavalry FC
19	FW	Tiago Coimbra	17 January 2004 (aged 18)	4	0	(Brazilian Football Confederation) Palmeiras
11	FW	Kamron Habibullah	23 October 2003 (aged 18)	5	2	(Canadian Soccer Association) Pacific FC
20	FW	Hugo Mbongue	24 July 2004 (aged 17)	4	0	(Canadian Soccer Association) Toronto FC II
9	FW	Lowell Wright	19 August 2003 (aged 18)	6	2	(Canadian Soccer Association) York United FC

==== Cuba ====
Coach: Pablo Elier Sánchez

Cuba's 20-man squad was announced on 10 June 2022.

- Names in italics denote players who have been capped for the senior team.

No.	Pos.	Player	Date of birth (age)	Caps	Goals	Club
1	GK	Ismel Morgado	31 May 2003 (aged 19)	0	0	(Football Association of Cuba) Sancti Spíritus
12	GK	Alejandro Fernández	8 May 2003 (aged 19)	0	0	(Football Association of Cuba) Las Tunas
16	GK	Kevin Fernández	11 June 2004 (aged 18)	0	0	(Football Association of Cuba) Matanzas
2	DF	Greibel Palma	10 February 2003 (aged 19)	0	0	(Football Association of Cuba) Ciego de Ávila
4	DF	Mario Peñalver	6 January 2003 (aged 19)	0	0	(Football Association of Cuba) Matanzas
6	DF	Yorlan Duboy	20 August 2004 (aged 17)	0	0	(Football Association of Cuba) Holguín
13	DF	Ronald Sánchez	31 March 2004 (aged 18)	0	0	(Football Association of Cuba) Matanzas
18	DF	Aldair Álvares	11 May 2003 (aged 19)	0	0	(Football Association of Cuba) Camagüey
5	MF	Eduardo Hernánez	18 February 2003 (aged 19)	0	0	(Football Association of Cuba) Santiago de Cuba
10	MF	Dairon Reyes	18 September 2003 (aged 18)	0	0	(United States Soccer Federation) Inter Miami II
14	MF	Ronaldo Noda	13 December 2003 (aged 18)	0	0	(Football Association of Cuba) Matanzas
15	MF	Rey Ángel Rodríguez	15 January 2003 (aged 19)	0	0	(Football Association of Cuba) La Habana
20	MF	Romario Torrez	9 February 2005 (aged 17)	0	0	(Football Association of Cuba) Artemisa
3	FW	Roberto Valdez	14 April 2003 (aged 19)	0	0	(Football Association of Cuba) La Habana
7	FW	José Paradela	9 January 2003 (aged 19)	0	0	(Football Association of Cuba) Matanzas
8	FW	Luis Ciudad	7 March 2003 (aged 19)	0	0	(Football Association of Cuba) Santiago de Cuba
9	FW	Kevin Quiñónes	3 January 2003 (aged 19)	0	0	(Football Association of Cuba) Ciego de Ávila
11	FW	Alejandro Delgado	14 February 2003 (aged 19)	0	0	(Football Association of Cuba) Cienfuegos
17	FW	Kevin Martín	2 September 2003 (aged 18)	0	0	(Football Association of Cuba) Camagüey
19	FW	Osniel Trutiet	11 March 2003 (aged 19)	0	0	(Football Association of Cuba) Las Tunas

==== Saint Kitts and Nevis ====
No.	Pos.	Player	Date of birth (age)	Caps	Goals	Club
	GK	Xander Parke	27 June 2004 (aged 17)	0	0	(The Football Association) Shrewsbury Town
	GK	Vibert Stephen	21 January 2005 (aged 17)	0	0	(St. Kitts and Nevis Football Association) Bath United
	DF	Rico Browne	28 December 2003 (aged 18)	0	0	(The Football Association) Birmingham City
	DF	Landrick Jones	25 June 2004 (aged 17)	0	0	(St. Kitts and Nevis Football Association) Newtown United
	DF	Omarion Liburd	3 March 2003 (aged 19)	0	0	(St. Kitts and Nevis Football Association) United Old Road Jets
	DF	Ajani Mills	13 December 2003 (aged 18)	0	0	(St. Kitts and Nevis Football Association) St. Paul's United
	DF	Dejahne Morris	13 October 2003 (aged 18)	0	0	(St. Kitts and Nevis Football Association) Garden Hotspurs
	DF	Jalden Myers	15 September 2003 (aged 18)	0	0	(St. Kitts and Nevis Football Association) Bath United
	MF	Caaja Burnham	2 July 2005 (aged 16)	0	0	(St. Kitts and Nevis Football Association) Village Superstars
	MF	Jermaine Chiuta	30 May 2003 (aged 19)	0	0	(Football Australia) North Star
	MF	Jabez Dorset	22 March 2004 (aged 18)	0	0	(St. Kitts and Nevis Football Association) Village Superstars
	MF	Kenaicy Dorsett	1 January 2004 (aged 18)	0	0	(St. Kitts and Nevis Football Association) Bath United
	MF	Chad Liburd	17 January 2004 (aged 18)	0	0	(St. Kitts and Nevis Football Association) Newtown United
	MF	Kaylon Liburd	13 May 2003 (aged 19)	0	0	(United States Soccer Federation) Omega Select
	MF	Zion Nisbett	29 March 2005 (aged 17)	0	0	(The Football Association) Solihull Moors
	FW	Joshua Bradshaw	25 June 2004 (aged 17)	0	0	(St. Kitts and Nevis Football Association) Cayon Rockets
	FW	Jahlyan Burt	23 October 2003 (aged 18)	0	0	Unknown
	FW	Micaah Garnette	28 May 2003 (aged 19)	0	0	(United States Soccer Federation) St. John's Red Storm
	FW	Dequan Joseph	17 July 2004 (aged 17)	0	0	Unknown
	FW	Shaheem Prentice	19 May 2003 (aged 19)	0	0	(St. Kitts and Nevis Football Association) St. Peters Strikers

==== United States ====
Obed Vargas withdrew injured and was replaced by Jackson Hopkins.

- Names in italics denote players who have been capped for the senior team.

No.	Pos.	Player	Date of birth (age)	Caps	Goals	Club
1	GK	Chris Brady	3 March 2004 (aged 18)	5	0	(United States Soccer Federation) Chicago Fire
12	GK	Antonio Carrera	15 March 2004 (aged 18)	1	0	(United States Soccer Federation) FC Dallas
2	DF	Mauricio Cuevas	10 February 2003 (aged 19)	6	1	(Royal Belgian Football Association) Club Brugge
3	DF	Noah Allen	28 April 2004 (aged 18)	3	0	(United States Soccer Federation) Inter Miami
4	DF	Marcus Ferkranus	10 May 2003 (aged 19)	4	0	(United States Soccer Federation) LA Galaxy
5	DF	Brandan Craig	7 April 2004 (aged 18)	4	0	(United States Soccer Federation) Philadelphia Union
13	DF	Michael Halliday	22 January 2003 (aged 19)	5	0	(United States Soccer Federation) Orlando City
14	DF	Jalen Neal	24 August 2003 (aged 18)	7	1	(United States Soccer Federation) LA Galaxy
6	MF	Daniel Edelman	28 April 2003 (aged 19)	5	0	(United States Soccer Federation) New York Red Bulls
8	MF	Jack McGlynn	7 July 2003 (aged 18)	8	1	(United States Soccer Federation) Philadelphia Union
10	MF	Paxten Aaronson	26 August 2003 (aged 18)	7	5	(United States Soccer Federation) Philadelphia Union
11	MF	Caden Clark	27 May 2003 (aged 19)	8	2	(United States Soccer Federation) New York Red Bulls
15	MF	Diego Luna	7 September 2003 (aged 18)	8	2	(United States Soccer Federation) Real Salt Lake
17	MF	Niko Tsakiris	19 June 2005 (aged 16)	3	2	(United States Soccer Federation) San Jose Earthquakes
19	MF	Alejandro Alvarado Jr.	29 July 2003 (aged 18)	4	0	(Portuguese Football Federation) Vizela
20	MF	Rokas Pukstas	25 August 2004 (aged 17)	6	1	(Croatian Football Federation) Hajduk Split
18	MF	Jackson Hopkins	1 July 2004 (aged 17)	1	0	(United States Soccer Federation) D.C. United
7	FW	Quinn Sullivan	27 March 2004 (aged 18)	7	6	(United States Soccer Federation) Philadelphia Union
9	FW	Cade Cowell	14 October 2003 (aged 18)	7	2	(United States Soccer Federation) San Jose Earthquakes
16	FW	Tyler Wolff	13 February 2003 (aged 19)	5	1	(United States Soccer Federation) Atlanta United

=== Group F ===
==== Haiti ====
No.	Pos.	Player	Date of birth (age)	Caps	Goals	Club
1	GK	Congaros Medina	29 December 2004 (aged 17)	0	0	(Haitian Football Federation) Violette
12	GK	Willemeson Augustin	21 July 2003 (aged 18)	0	0	(Haitian Football Federation) Tempête
2	DF	Duckens Pierre	5 October 2004 (aged 17)	0	0	(Haitian Football Federation) Don Bosco
4	DF	Fernando Ciceron	26 December 2003 (aged 18)	0	0	(Haitian Football Federation) Violette
15	DF	Michelson Alexandre	1 May 2004 (aged 18)	0	0	Unknown
17	DF	Kyan Champagne	19 February 2004 (aged 18)	0	0	(Royal Spanish Football Federation) IDA
6	MF	Woodensky Pierre	30 December 2004 (aged 17)	0	0	(Haitian Football Federation) Violette
10	MF	Shad San Millán	25 June 2004 (aged 17)	0	0	(Royal Spanish Football Federation) Getafe
14	MF	Édouard Vorbe	3 January 2004 (aged 18)	0	0	(Haitian Football Federation) Violette
16	MF	Nicolas Lacombe	16 December 2004 (aged 17)	0	0	(Royal Spanish Football Federation) UE Costa Brava
20	MF	Juff Éxilus	27 June 2003 (aged 18)	0	0	(United States Soccer Federation) TSF
3	FW	Jean Leriche	27 January 2003 (aged 19)	0	0	(Haitian Football Federation) Violette
5	FW	Ross Appolon	14 June 2004 (aged 18)	0	0	(Canadian Soccer Association) Laval
7	FW	Bryan Destin	26 February 2006 (aged 16)	0	0	(United States Soccer Federation) Inter Miami
8	FW	Joel Favard	30 June 2003 (aged 18)	0	0	(United States Soccer Federation) F.C. New York
9	FW	Steevenson Jeudy	17 October 2004 (aged 17)	0	0	(Haitian Football Federation) Violette
11	FW	Watz Leazard	17 June 2003 (aged 19)	0	0	(Haitian Football Federation) Real Hope FA
13	FW	Omre Etienne	26 February 2003 (aged 19)	0	0	(United States Soccer Federation) TSF
18	FW	Mateo Scott	4 June 2004 (aged 18)	0	0	(Royal Spanish Football Federation) UE Costa Brava
19	FW	Adelson Belizaire	1 June 2005 (aged 17)	0	0	(Haitian Football Federation) Baltimore

==== Mexico ====
No.	Pos.	Player	Date of birth (age)	Club
1	GK	Emiliano Pérez	21 June 2003 (aged 18)	(Mexican Football Federation) Necaxa
12	GK	José Eulogio	11 February 2004 (aged 18)	(Mexican Football Federation) Pachuca
2	DF	Emilio Martínez	2 February 2003 (aged 19)	(Mexican Football Federation) Puebla
3	DF	Antonio Leone	28 April 2004 (aged 18)	(United States Soccer Federation) LAFC
4	DF	Jesús Alcántar	30 July 2003 (aged 18)	(Mexican Football Federation) Necaxa
13	DF	Diego Gómez	10 September 2003 (aged 18)	(Mexican Football Federation) Necaxa
14	DF	Emiliano Freyfeld	16 March 2004 (aged 18)	(Mexican Football Federation) UNAM
15	DF	Everardo López	23 March 2005 (aged 17)	(Mexican Football Federation) Toluca
16	DF	Rafael Palma	9 January 2003 (aged 19)	(Mexican Football Federation) Pachuca
6	MF	Fidel Ambríz	21 March 2003 (aged 19)	(Mexican Football Federation) León
8	MF	Salvador Mariscal	22 April 2003 (aged 19)	(Mexican Football Federation) Santos Laguna
10	MF	Karel Campos	17 January 2003 (aged 19)	(Mexican Football Federation) América
17	MF	Saúl Zamora	26 March 2003 (aged 19)	(Mexican Football Federation) León
20	MF	Heriberto Jurado	3 January 2005 (aged 17)	(Mexican Football Federation) Necaxa
5	FW	Isaías Violante	20 October 2003 (aged 18)	(Mexican Football Federation) Toluca
7	FW	Christian Torres	15 April 2004 (aged 18)	(United States Soccer Federation) LAFC
9	FW	Jesús Hernández	9 January 2004 (aged 18)	(Mexican Football Federation) Querétaro
11	FW	Bryan González	10 April 2003 (aged 19)	(Mexican Football Federation) Pachuca
18	FW	Jonathan Perez	18 January 2003 (aged 19)	(United States Soccer Federation) LA Galaxy
19	FW	Esteban Lozano	10 March 2003 (aged 19)	(Mexican Football Federation) América

==== Suriname ====
No.	Pos.	Player	Date of birth (age)	Caps	Goals	Club
	GK	Jonathan Fonkel	April 15, 2005 (age 21)	1	0	(Surinamese Football Association) Robinhood
	GK	Dwayne Meerzorg	August 24, 2003 (age 23)	2	0	(Surinamese Football Association) Leo Victor
	DF	Shafiek Wassenaar	January 9, 2003 (age 23)	2	0	(Surinamese Football Association) Flora
	DF	Gabriel de Mees	October 5, 2004 (age 22)	2	0	(Surinamese Football Association) Transvaal
	DF	Raviek Pryor	March 7, 2004 (age 22)	0	0	(Surinamese Football Association) Robinhood
	DF	Eja Dakriet	November 8, 2003 (age 22)	2	0	(Royal Dutch Football Association) PEC Zwolle
	DF	Jair Brashuis	July 21, 2003 (age 23)	0	0	(Surinamese Football Association) Leo Victor
	DF	Jamal Lodik	March 11, 2004 (age 22)	0	0	(Surinamese Football Association) Robinhood
	DF	Dichayro Naarendorp	June 15, 2004 (age 22)	2	0	(Royal Dutch Football Association) Utrecht
	MF	Rafael Wartes	March 12, 2003 (age 23)	0	0	(Surinamese Football Association) Robinhood
	MF	Eldjero de Mees	March 10, 2005 (age 21)	1	0	(Surinamese Football Association) Transvaal
	MF	Jayen Gerold	June 30, 2004 (age 22)	2	0	(Royal Dutch Football Association) AZ
	MF	Jaydavon Haas	February 21, 2004 (age 22)	2	0	(Royal Dutch Football Association) ADO Den Haag
	MF	Chiverio Adelij	November 29, 2004 (age 21)	2	0	(Royal Dutch Football Association) Sparta Rotterdam
	MF	Amiel Reingoud	February 21, 2004 (age 22)	1	0	(Surinamese Football Association) Santos
	MF	Chesron Oostwoud	October 10, 2003 (age 23)	2	0	(Royal Dutch Football Association) Heerenveen
	FW	Dimitrio Andro	July 24, 2003 (age 23)	2	0	(Surinamese Football Association) Transvaal
	FW	Givon Derby	April 4, 2003 (age 23)	2	0	(Portuguese Football Federation) Beira Mar
	FW	Roche Asidan	September 9, 2003 (age 23)	2	0	(Surinamese Football Association) Leo Victor
	FW	Georrayne Boumann	January 12, 2005 (age 21)	2	0	(Royal Dutch Football Association) NAC

==== Trinidad and Tobago ====
- Names in italics denote players who have been capped for the senior team.

No.	Pos.	Player	Date of birth (age)	Caps	Goals	Club
	GK	Tristan Edwards	7 July 2004 (age 22)	0	0	Unknown
	GK	Jaheim Wickham	26 February 2003 (age 23)	0	0	(Canadian Soccer Association) Toronto
	DF	Christian Bailey	14 May 2004 (age 22)	0	0	(Trinidad and Tobago Football Association) Defence Force
	DF	Josiah Cooper	29 July 2004 (age 22)	0	0	(Trinidad and Tobago Football Association) Club Sando
	DF	Jaheim Joseph	26 October 2003 (age 23)	0	0	(Trinidad and Tobago Football Association) Defence Force
	DF	Jaron Pascall	21 January 2004 (age 22)	0	0	(Trinidad and Tobago Football Association) Police
	DF	Noah Roka	28 November 2003 (age 22)	0	0	(Austrian Football Association) FC Stadlau
	DF	Isaiah Thompson	18 February 2004 (age 22)	0	0	Unknown
	DF	Tyrik Trotman	21 January 2004 (age 22)	0	0	Unknown
	DF	Marvin Waldrop	20 January 2003 (age 23)	0	0	(Trinidad and Tobago Football Association) Club Sando
	MF	Micah Cain	10 April 2003 (age 23)	0	0	(German Football Association) TSV Meerbusch
	MF	Kassidy Davidson	13 September 2004 (age 22)	0	0	Unknown
	MF	Andrew De Gannes	9 April 2003 (age 23)	0	0	Unknown
	MF	Nathaniel James	17 June 2004 (age 22)	0	0	(Trinidad and Tobago Football Association) W Connection
10	MF	Molik Khan	8 April 2004 (age 22)	0	0	(United States Soccer Federation) Minnesota United FC
	MF	Luke Phillip	21 August 2004 (age 22)	0	0	(Trinidad and Tobago Football Association) Point Fortin Civic
	MF	Kaihim Thomas	8 February 2003 (age 23)	0	0	(Trinidad and Tobago Football Association) La Horquetta Rangers
	FW	Real Gill	23 January 2003 (age 23)	0	0	(Trinidad and Tobago Football Association) La Horquetta Rangers
	FW	Tarik Lee	28 December 2003 (age 22)	0	0	(Trinidad and Tobago Football Association) W Connection
	FW	Josiah Wilson	12 September 2004 (age 22)	0	0	Free agent

=== Group G ===
==== Aruba ====
- Names in italics denote players who have been capped for the senior team.

No.	Pos.	Player	Date of birth (age)	Caps	Goals	Club
1	GK	Jahmani Eisden	19 July 2005 (age 21)	0	0	(Aruba Football Federation) Dakota
13	GK	Samir Erasmus	9 November 2003 (age 22)	0	0	(Aruba Football Federation) RCA
2	DF	Anthony Maduro	2 March 2004 (age 22)	0	0	(Aruba Football Federation) Estrella
14	DF	José Robles	28 October 2003 (age 23)	0	0	(Royal Spanish Football Federation) Segoviana
15	DF	Nathan Solagnier	29 August 2004 (age 22)	0	0	(Aruba Football Federation) Aruba Soccer Academy
20	DF	Basley Merveille	2 March 2005 (age 21)	0	0	(Aruba Football Federation) Aruba Soccer Academy
3	MF	Ezekiel Frans	22 November 2003 (age 22)	0	0	(Royal Dutch Football Association) CASA
4	MF	Jaybrien Romano	13 December 2004 (age 21)	0	0	Unknown
6	MF	Bernard Smolders	26 May 2004 (age 22)	0	0	(Aruba Football Federation) River Plate Aruba
8	MF	Milan Bouwer	28 April 2003 (age 23)	0	0	(Royal Dutch Football Association) Nootdorp
9	MF	Mishawn Molina	16 January 2005 (age 21)	0	0	(Royal Dutch Football Association) Excelsior
11	MF	Ludgeneson de Cuba	15 January 2005 (age 21)	0	0	(Aruba Football Federation) RCA
12	MF	Bryaden Koolman	10 February 2005 (age 21)	0	0	(Aruba Football Federation) Estrella
16	MF	Quion Poppen	15 April 2005 (age 21)	0	0	(Royal Dutch Football Association) Spartaan '20
18	MF	Joey Franken	11 April 2005 (age 21)	0	0	(German Football Association) Portugal SV Witten
5	FW	Kymani Nedd	10 June 2004 (age 22)	0	0	(Royal Dutch Football Association) Excelsior
7	FW	Terick Monsanto	7 February 2004 (age 22)	0	0	(Royal Dutch Football Association) Sparta Rotterdam
10	FW	Jaydon Dania	29 October 2004 (age 22)	0	0	(Royal Dutch Football Association) AFC '34
17	FW	Javier Valerio	18 January 2003 (age 23)	0	0	(Royal Dutch Football Association) VVV-Venlo
19	FW	Evander Nedd	28 December 2005 (age 20)	0	0	(Aruba Football Federation) RCA

==== El Salvador ====
- Names in italics denote players who have been capped for the senior team.

No.	Pos.	Player	Date of birth (age)	Caps	Goals	Club
	GK	Damián Alguera	11 February 2004 (age 22)	4	0	(United States Soccer Federation) Philadelphia Union
	GK	Sergio Sibrián	8 July 2004 (age 22)	0	0	(Salvadoran Football Federation) Alianza
	DF	Alejandro Cano	21 May 2004 (age 22)	6	0	(United States Soccer Federation) San Jose Earthquakes
	DF	Mauricio Cerritos	17 October 2003 (age 23)	0	0	(Salvadoran Football Federation) Atlético Marte
	DF	René Dueñas	2 May 2004 (age 22)	0	0	(Salvadoran Football Federation) FAS
	DF	Cesar Orellana		0	0	Unknown
	DF	Walter Pineda	4 May 2003 (age 23)	0	0	(Salvadoran Football Federation) Águila
	DF	Alexander Romero	24 September 2004 (age 22)	4	0	(United States Soccer Federation) Los Angeles FC
	DF	Alejandro Serrano	4 December 2003 (age 22)	0	0	(Salvadoran Football Federation) Santa Tecla
	MF	Robinson Aguirre	23 November 2004 (age 21)	7	0	(United States Soccer Federation) Colorado Rapids
	MF	Hamilton Benítez	28 August 2003 (age 23)	0	0	(Salvadoran Football Federation) Alianza
	MF	Danny Ríos	29 March 2003 (age 23)	0	0	(United States Soccer Federation) Houston Dynamo
	MF	Jeremy Garay	1 April 2003 (age 23)	5	1	(United States Soccer Federation) D.C. United
	MF	Mayer Gil	7 September 2003 (age 23)	0	0	(Salvadoran Football Federation) Real Destroyer
	MF	Harold Osorio	20 August 2003 (age 23)	0	0	(Salvadoran Football Federation) Alianza
	FW	Ronald Arévalo	18 May 2003 (age 23)	0	0	(Football Association of Finland) OTP
	FW	Isaac Esquivel	30 December 2003 (age 22)	0	0	(Salvadoran Football Federation) Marte Soyapango
	FW	Javier Mariona	17 October 2004 (age 22)	2	2	(United States Soccer Federation) Oakland Roots SC
	FW	Alexander Umaña	12 October 2003 (age 23)	5	3	(United States Soccer Federation) Sporting Kansas City

==== Guatemala ====
Guatemala announced their final squad of 20 players on 16 June 2022.

No.	Pos.	Player	Date of birth (age)	Caps	Goals	Club
	GK	José Aguirre	31 August 2003 (age 23)	1	0	(German Football Association) VfB Lübeck
	GK	Jorge Moreno	28 December 2004 (age 21)	3	0	(National Football Federation of Guatemala) Comunicaciones
	DF	Anderson Gaitán	31 January 2003 (age 23)	3	0	(National Football Federation of Guatemala) Municipal
	DF	Juan Mancilla	13 February 2004 (age 22)	3	0	(National Football Federation of Guatemala) Municipal
	DF	Marvin Mejía	28 February 2003 (age 23)	3	0	(National Football Federation of Guatemala) Juventud Canadiense
	DF	Edy Palencia	6 January 2004 (age 22)	4	0	(National Football Federation of Guatemala) Comunicaciones
	DF	Arian Recinos	3 February 2005 (age 21)	3	0	(United States Soccer Federation) New York Red Bulls
	MF	Daniel Cardoza	15 March 2004 (age 22)	3	0	(National Football Federation of Guatemala) Comunicaciones
	MF	Randall Corado	1 September 2004 (age 22)	4	0	(National Football Federation of Guatemala) Municipal
	MF	Allan Juárez	2 February 2004 (age 22)	3	2	(United States Soccer Federation) San Jose Earthquakes
	MF	Kevin Mendoza	23 November 2003 (age 22)	1	0	(United States Soccer Federation) Limeño Soccer Academy
	MF	Figo Montaño	7 April 2004 (age 22)	4	0	(National Football Federation of Guatemala) Municipal
	MF	Rudy Muñoz	6 February 2005 (age 21)	3	0	(National Football Federation of Guatemala) Municipal
	MF	Carlos Santos	5 August 2003 (age 23)	4	1	(National Football Federation of Guatemala) Iztapa
	MF	Jeshua Urizar	19 October 2004 (age 22)	4	0	(National Football Federation of Guatemala) Mixco
	FW	Jefry Bantes	8 March 2004 (age 22)	3	0	(National Football Federation of Guatemala) Municipal
	FW	Néstor Cabrera	12 November 2003 (age 22)	4	0	(United States Soccer Federation) Queensboro
	FW	Jonathan Franco	26 July 2003 (age 23)	4	0	(National Football Federation of Guatemala) Municipal
	FW	Arquimides Ordonez	5 August 2003 (age 23)	4	3	(United States Soccer Federation) FC Cincinnati
	FW	Anderson Villagrán	10 May 2003 (age 23)	2	1	(National Football Federation of Guatemala) Suchitepéquez

==== Panama ====
- Names in italics denote players who have been capped for the senior team.

No.	Pos.	Player	Date of birth (age)	Caps	Goals	Club
	GK	Xavier Cruz	12 October 2003 (age 23)	0	0	(Panamanian Football Federation) San Francisco
	GK	Miguel Pérez	21 February 2003 (age 23)	0	0	(Panamanian Football Federation) Sporting San Miguelito
	DF	Omar Alba	26 March 2004 (age 22)	0	0	(Panamanian Football Federation) Plaza Amador
	DF	Kevin Garrido	6 July 2003 (age 23)	0	0	(Panamanian Football Federation) Herrera
	DF	Aimar Modelo	25 January 2005 (age 21)	0	0	(Panamanian Football Federation) Independiente
	DF	Humberto Ramos	29 October 2003 (age 23)	0	0	(Panamanian Football Federation) Sporting San Miguelito
	DF	Omar Valencia	8 June 2004 (age 22)	0	0	(Panamanian Football Federation) Plaza Amador
	MF	Nicholas Anderson	21 May 2003 (age 23)	0	0	(Panamanian Football Federation) Tauro
	MF	Edward Cedeño	5 July 2003 (age 23)	0	0	(Panamanian Football Federation) Costa del Este
	MF	Christian Ruíz	6 July 2003 (age 23)	0	0	(Panamanian Football Federation) Costa del Este
	MF	Rodrigo Tello	18 August 2003 (age 23)	0	0	(Panamanian Football Federation) Costa del Este
	MF	Rodolfo Vega	12 June 2003 (age 23)	0	0	(Panamanian Football Federation) Plaza Amador
	FW	Javier Betegón	12 February 2003 (age 23)	0	0	(Portuguese Football Federation) Nacional
	FW	Keny Bonilla	2 April 2003 (age 23)	0	0	(Panamanian Football Federation) San Francisco
	FW	Derek Briceño	28 October 2003 (age 23)	0	0	(Panamanian Football Federation) Plaza Amador
	FW	Ricardo Gorday	26 October 2004 (age 22)	0	0	(Panamanian Football Federation) Tauro
	FW	Rafael Mosquera	24 May 2005 (age 21)	0	0	(Panamanian Football Federation) Plaza Amador
	FW	Carlos Rivera	24 February 2003 (age 23)	0	0	(Israel Football Association) Maccabi Tel Aviv
	FW	Leonel Tejada	11 February 2003 (age 23)	0	0	(Panamanian Football Federation) Plaza Amador
	FW	Reymundo Williams	7 January 2004 (age 22)	0	0	(Portuguese Football Federation) Lusitânia

=== Group H ===
==== Antigua and Barbuda ====
- Names in italics denote players who have been capped for the senior team.

No.	Pos.	Player	Date of birth (age)	Caps	Goals	Club
1	GK	Shahoi Dorsett	23 June 2004 (age 22)	1	0	(Antigua and Barbuda Football Association) Villa Lions
21	GK	Taj Moore	16 June 2005 (age 21)	1	0	Unknown
22	GK	Nalian Gonsalves	30 March 2004 (age 22)	0	0	(Antigua and Barbuda Football Association) Villa Lions
4	DF	Zaire Scott	31 May 2003 (age 23)	1	0	Unknown
19	DF	Dorian Cole	25 March 2004 (age 22)	0	0	(Antigua and Barbuda Football Association) All Saints United
20	DF	Blavion James	19 June 2003 (age 23)	1	0	(Antigua and Barbuda Football Association) Old Road
2	MF	Joylan Sinclair	14 November 2004 (age 21)	1	0	(Antigua and Barbuda Football Association) Ottos Rangers
3	MF	Tyrik Hughes	13 July 2005 (age 21)	1	0	(Antigua and Barbuda Football Association) Villa Lions
6	MF	Dajun Barthley	10 January 2004 (age 22)	1	0	(Antigua and Barbuda Football Association) Villa Lions
10	MF	Ronaldo Flowers	9 March 2003 (age 23)	1	0	(Antigua and Barbuda Football Association) Villa Lions
12	MF	Kofi Gonsalves	10 October 2003 (age 23)	0	0	Unknown
14	MF	Aiden Jarvis	14 November 2006 (age 19)	1	0	(United States Soccer Federation) New York Red Bulls
16	MF	Sean Tomlinson	25 March 2004 (age 22)	1	0	Unknown
17	MF	Wilden Cornwall Jr.	8 August 2005 (age 21)	1	0	(Antigua and Barbuda Football Association) Liberta
5	FW	Zaheim Greene	15 August 2003 (age 23)	1	0	(Antigua and Barbuda Football Association) Empire
7	FW	Jalmaro Calvin	30 June 2003 (age 23)	1	0	(Jamaica Football Federation) Cavalier
8	FW	Conor Hadeed	5 April 2003 (age 23)	1	0	Unknown
9	FW	Alexander Moody-Stuart	27 August 2004 (age 22)	1	0	Unknown
11	FW	Daryl Massicot	12 February 2005 (age 21)	1	0	(Antigua and Barbuda Football Association) Jennings United
13	FW	Drake Hadeed	21 November 2007 (age 18)	0	0	(The Football Association) West Ham United
15	FW	Dillan Hadeed	25 March 2003 (age 23)	0	0	Unknown

==== Costa Rica ====
- Names in italics denote players who have been capped for the senior team.

No.	Pos.	Player	Date of birth (age)	Caps	Goals	Club
1	GK	Abraham Madriz	2 April 2004 (age 22)	0	0	(Costa Rican Football Federation) Saprissa
18	GK	Bayron Mora	5 May 2003 (age 23)	1	0	(Costa Rican Football Federation) Alajuelense
2	DF	Julián González	27 January 2005 (age 21)	1	0	(Costa Rican Football Federation) Saprissa
3	DF	Douglas Sequeira	16 September 2003 (age 23)	1	0	(Costa Rican Football Federation) Uruguay
4	DF	Brandon Calderón	21 July 2004 (age 22)	1	0	(United States Soccer Federation) UCF Knights
5	DF	Santiago van der Putten	25 June 2004 (age 22)	1	0	(Costa Rican Football Federation) Alajuelense
12	DF	Shawn Johnson	28 February 2003 (age 23)	1	0	(Costa Rican Football Federation) Guanacasteca
13	DF	Keral Ríos	5 March 2003 (age 23)	0	0	(Costa Rican Football Federation) Pérez Zeledón
6	MF	Ricardo Peña	15 July 2004 (age 22)	1	0	(Costa Rican Football Federation) Futbol Consultants
7	MF	Andrey Soto	8 April 2003 (age 23)	1	0	(Costa Rican Football Federation) San Carlos
8	MF	Creichel Pérez	11 November 2004 (age 21)	0	0	(Costa Rican Football Federation) Guadalupe
10	MF	Brandon Aguilera	28 June 2003 (age 23)	1	0	(Costa Rican Football Federation) Guanacasteca
14	MF	Timothy Arias	30 September 2004 (age 22)	1	0	(United States Soccer Federation) UCF Knights
16	MF	Andrey Salmerón	22 March 2004 (age 22)	1	0	(Costa Rican Football Federation) Futbol Consultants
9	FW	Doryan Rodríguez	18 January 2003 (age 23)	1	0	(Costa Rican Football Federation) Alajuelense
11	FW	Josimar Alcócer	17 July 2004 (age 22)	1	0	(Costa Rican Football Federation) Alajuelense
15	FW	Jostin Tellería	10 April 2003 (age 23)	1	0	(Royal Spanish Football Federation) Intercity
17	FW	Jewison Bennette	15 June 2004 (age 22)	1	0	(Costa Rican Football Federation) Herediano
19	FW	Fabricio Alemán	26 July 2003 (age 23)	1	0	(Royal Spanish Football Federation) Intercity
20	FW	Enyel Escoe	8 May 2003 (age 23)	0	0	(Costa Rican Football Federation) Grecia

==== Honduras ====
No.	Pos.	Player	Date of birth (age)	Caps	Goals	Club
1	GK	Juergen García	28 January 2005 (age 21)	5	0	(National Autonomous Federation of Football of Honduras) Lone
12	GK	José Valdez	17 April 2003 (age 23)	0	0	(National Autonomous Federation of Football of Honduras) Vida
2	DF	Darlin Mencia	9 April 2003 (age 23)	1	0	(National Autonomous Federation of Football of Honduras) Real España
3	DF	Geremy Rodas	19 March 2004 (age 22)	5	0	(National Autonomous Federation of Football of Honduras) UPNFM
4	DF	Anfronit Tatum	2 June 2005 (age 21)	2	0	(National Autonomous Federation of Football of Honduras) Real España
5	DF	Aaron Zúñiga	4 November 2003 (age 23)	5	1	(National Autonomous Federation of Football of Honduras) Real España
13	DF	Jeyson Contreras	16 March 2003 (age 23)	5	1	(National Autonomous Federation of Football of Honduras) Marathón
14	DF	Javier Arriaga	1 August 2004 (age 22)	4	0	(National Autonomous Federation of Football of Honduras) Atlético Junior
6	MF	Edson Rocha	29 June 2003 (age 23)	5	0	(National Autonomous Federation of Football of Honduras) Platense
7	MF	Odin Peña	16 February 2004 (age 22)	5	0	(National Autonomous Federation of Football of Honduras) Marathón
8	MF	Tomás Sorto	16 January 2003 (age 23)	5	0	(National Autonomous Federation of Football of Honduras) Honduras Progreso
10	MF	Antony García	29 October 2004 (age 22)	5	0	(National Autonomous Federation of Football of Honduras) Vida
16	MF	Isaac Castillo	24 May 2003 (age 23)	4	1	(National Autonomous Federation of Football of Honduras) Marathón
17	MF	Miguel Carrasco	10 June 2003 (age 23)	5	1	(National Autonomous Federation of Football of Honduras) Real España
19	MF	Jefryn Macías	2 January 2004 (age 22)	5	3	(National Autonomous Federation of Football of Honduras) UPNFM
20	MF	Jafet Núñez	28 September 2003 (age 23)	4	0	(National Autonomous Federation of Football of Honduras) Olimpia
9	FW	Exon Arzú	19 May 2004 (age 22)	4	0	(National Autonomous Federation of Football of Honduras) Real España
11	FW	Marco Aceituno	28 December 2003 (age 22)	5	6	(National Autonomous Federation of Football of Honduras) Real España
15	FW	Kolton Kelly	12 February 2004 (age 22)	5	0	(National Autonomous Federation of Football of Honduras) Victoria
18	FW	Kevin Güiti	8 March 2003 (age 23)	1	0	(National Autonomous Federation of Football of Honduras) Olimpia

==== Jamaica ====
- Names in italics denote players who have been capped for the senior team.

No.	Pos.	Player	Date of birth (age)	Caps	Goals	Club
1	GK	Coniah Boyce-Clarke	1 March 2003 (age 23)	4	0	(The Football Association) Reading
13	GK	Ricardo Watson	9 July 2003 (age 23)	0	0	Unknown
2	DF	Dexter Lembikisa	4 November 2003 (age 23)	0	0	(The Football Association) Wolverhampton Wanderers
3	DF	Romain Blake	14 July 2005 (age 21)	4	0	(Jamaica Football Federation) Waterhouse
4	DF	Luke Badley-Morgan	22 October 2003 (age 23)	4	0	(The Football Association) Chelsea
5	DF	Jadon Anderson	20 November 2003 (age 22)	2	0	Unknown
6	DF	Tarick Ximines	7 October 2004 (age 22)	3	1	(Jamaica Football Federation) Harbour View
12	DF	Luis Watson	4 March 2003 (age 23)	3	0	(Jamaica Football Federation) Santos
14	DF	Lamonth Rochester	10 June 2003 (age 23)	3	0	(Jamaica Football Federation) Cavalier
8	MF	Christopher Pearson	21 January 2003 (age 23)	4	0	(Jamaica Football Federation) Cavalier
10	MF	Duncan McKenzie	10 December 2003 (age 22)	4	0	(Jamaica Football Federation) Real Mona
11	MF	Jemone Barclay	9 June 2003 (age 23)	3	0	(Jamaica Football Federation) Portmore United
15	MF	Kobi Thomas	16 December 2005 (age 20)	4	0	(United States Soccer Federation) Inter Miami
17	MF	Malachi Douglas	8 October 2004 (age 22)	1	0	Unknown
18	MF	Alexander Bicknell	14 February 2005 (age 21)	3	0	(German Football Association) Fortuna Köln
20	MF	Chad James	1 September 2004 (age 22)	4	0	Unknown
7	FW	Devonte Campbell	25 October 2003 (age 23)	4	0	(Jamaica Football Federation) Mount Pleasant
9	FW	Jahmari Clarke	2 October 2003 (age 23)	4	3	(The Football Association) Reading
16	FW	Tyler Roberts	22 December 2003 (age 22)	4	0	(The Football Association) Wolverhampton Wanderers
19	FW	Zion Scarlett	5 May 2004 (age 22)	4	1	(United States Soccer Federation) Columbus Crew

== Knockout stage ==
=== Curaçao ===
- Names in italics denote players who have been capped for the senior team.

No.	Pos.	Player	Date of birth (age)	Caps	Goals	Club
1	GK	Nino Fancito	30 September 2004 (age 22)	0	0	(Royal Dutch Football Association) Eindhoven
20	GK	Shedrion Mathilda	15 November 2004 (age 21)	0	0	(Curaçao Football Federation) SUBT
2	DF	Alrick Pantophlet	24 July 2003 (age 23)	4	0	(Curaçao Football Federation) Jong Holland
3	DF	Keanu Does	8 January 2004 (age 22)	4	3	(Royal Dutch Football Association) ADO Den Haag
4	DF	Jaïr Bryson	24 September 2003 (age 23)	4	1	(Royal Dutch Football Association) Telstar
5	DF	Denzley Griët	26 December 2003 (age 22)	4	0	(Royal Dutch Football Association) Dordrecht
8	DF	Ghillian Ilaria	25 April 2004 (age 22)	4	2	(Royal Dutch Football Association) Almere City
17	DF	Vinsley Cathalina	26 June 2003 (age 23)	0	0	(Curaçao Football Federation) Victory Boys
18	DF	Reuel Martina	11 September 2004 (age 22)	1	0	(Curaçao Football Federation) Vesta
6	MF	Rayhim Inesia	16 January 2004 (age 22)	4	0	(Curaçao Football Federation) Scherpenheuvel
10	MF	Naygiro Sambo	21 January 2004 (age 22)	3	5	(Royal Dutch Football Association) Vitesse
13	MF	Calvin Gustina	19 November 2004 (age 21)	0	0	(Royal Dutch Football Association) ADO Den Haag
7	FW	Jaydino Jacobus	13 April 2005 (age 21)	0	0	(Royal Dutch Football Association) NAC
9	FW	Juruël Bernadina	11 May 2003 (age 23)	4	6	(Royal Dutch Football Association) Utrecht
11	FW	Gio-Renys Felicia	2 February 2004 (age 22)	4	2	Free agent
12	FW	Rayvian Job	25 April 2004 (age 22)	0	0	(Royal Dutch Football Association) Excelsior
14	FW	Sidney Kastaneer	6 March 2003 (age 23)	4	1	(Curaçao Football Federation) Vesta
15	FW	Nigel Marengo	2 February 2004 (age 22)	0	0	(Royal Dutch Football Association) Heerenveen
16	FW	Gior Selassa	29 April 2005 (age 21)	0	0	(Curaçao Football Federation) Inter Willemstad
19	FW	Rayden Winklaar	27 March 2004 (age 22)	3	0	(Curaçao Football Federation) UNDEBA

=== Dominican Republic ===
- Names in italics denote players who have been capped for the senior team.

No.	Pos.	Player	Date of birth (age)	Caps	Goals	Club
1	GK	Omry Bello	28 May 2003 (age 23)	7	0	(Dominican Football Federation) O&M
12	GK	Xavier Valdez	23 November 2003 (age 22)	2	0	(United States Soccer Federation) Houston Dynamo
2	DF	Charbel Wehbe	8 May 2004 (age 22)	0	0	(Royal Spanish Football Federation) Real Oviedo
3	DF	Thomas Jungbauer	30 July 2005 (age 21)	0	0	(Italian Football Federation) SPAL
4	DF	Sebastián Mañón	13 February 2003 (age 23)	7	0	(United States Soccer Federation) Black Rock
5	DF	Kleffer Martes	13 January 2003 (age 23)	4	1	(Dominican Football Federation) Atlético San Cristóbal
6	DF	Israel Boatwright	2 June 2005 (age 21)	2	1	(United States Soccer Federation) Inter Miami
18	DF	Alfeni Tamárez	14 June 2005 (age 21)	4	0	(Dominican Football Federation) Atlético Pantoja
8	MF	Ángel Montes de Oca	18 February 2003 (age 23)	6	4	(Dominican Football Federation) Cibao
9	MF	Anyelo Gómez	2 January 2003 (age 23)	6	1	(Dominican Football Federation) Jarabacoa
14	MF	Yordy Álvarez	3 December 2005 (age 20)	4	1	(Dominican Football Federation) Delfines del Este
16	MF	Miguel Vásquez	26 February 2004 (age 22)	0	0	(Dominican Football Federation) Atlético Pantoja
20	MF	Annier Rojas	16 October 2003 (age 23)	0	0	(Dominican Football Federation) Atlético Pantoja
7	FW	Bryan More	29 May 2003 (age 23)	4	1	(Dominican Football Federation) Atlético Vega Real
10	FW	Edison Azcona	21 November 2003 (age 22)	5	3	(United States Soccer Federation) Inter Miami
11	FW	Diefri Sandy	21 June 2004 (age 22)	4	1	(Dominican Football Federation) Cibao
13	FW	Adhonys Vargas	12 February 2004 (age 22)	4	1	(Dominican Football Federation) Atlético Vega Real
15	FW	Luis Francisco	26 March 2004 (age 22)	4	0	Unknown
17	FW	Jason Yambatis	21 March 2003 (age 23)	4	3	(Dominican Football Federation) Atlético Pantoja
19	FW	Guillermo de Peña	22 July 2003 (age 23)	1	0	(Dominican Football Federation) Moca

=== Nicaragua ===
- Names in italics denote players who have been capped for the senior team.

No.	Pos.	Player	Date of birth (age)	Caps	Goals	Club
	GK	Miguel Rodríguez	13 June 2003 (age 23)	3	0	(Nicaraguan Football Federation) Deportivo Ocotal
	GK	César Salandía	13 June 2004 (age 22)	0	0	(Nicaraguan Football Federation) Real Estelí
	DF	Cristhian Herrera	22 March 2004 (age 22)	3	0	(Nicaraguan Football Federation) Real Estelí
	DF	Jermar López	26 September 2003 (age 23)	1	0	Unknown
	DF	Dylan Pineda	3 May 2004 (age 22)	3	0	(Nicaraguan Football Federation) Diriangén
	DF	Joel Soto	11 March 2003 (age 23)	3	0	(Nicaraguan Football Federation) Diriangén
	DF	Kurt Thomas	21 August 2003 (age 23)	3	0	(Nicaraguan Football Federation) Juventus
	MF	Keylon Batiz	1 February 2004 (age 22)	3	3	(Nicaraguan Football Federation) Real Estelí
	MF	Joarlyn Caldera	15 August 2004 (age 22)	0	0	(Nicaraguan Football Federation) Real Estelí
	MF	Fredman Kirklan	9 October 2004 (age 22)	0	0	(Nicaraguan Football Federation) Real Estelí
	MF	Freddy Ortiz	22 November 2005 (age 20)	0	0	(Swiss Football Association) Servette
	MF	José Israel Reyes	22 January 2003 (age 23)	0	0	(Costa Rican Football Federation) Guadalupe
	MF	Osmin Salinas	3 February 2004 (age 22)	3	0	(Nicaraguan Football Federation) Real Estelí
	MF	Óscar Soto	5 March 2003 (age 23)	3	0	(Nicaraguan Football Federation) Managua
	MF	Widman Talavera	12 January 2003 (age 23)	3	3	(Nicaraguan Football Federation) Real Estelí
	FW	Jareck Cáceres	10 January 2003 (age 23)	3	3	(Nicaraguan Football Federation) UNAN Managua
	FW	Manuel Gutiérrez	14 August 2003 (age 23)	2	2	Free agent
	FW	Carlos Pérez	9 October 2003 (age 23)	0	0	(Costa Rican Football Federation) San Carlos
	FW	Ocnarpz Rodríguez	22 September 2004 (age 22)	2	0	(Nicaraguan Football Federation) Real Estelí
	FW	Anyelo Velásquez	22 December 2004 (age 21)	0	0	(Nicaraguan Football Federation) Diriangén

=== Puerto Rico ===
- Names in italics denote players who have been capped for the senior team.

No.	Pos.	Player	Date of birth (age)	Caps	Goals	Club
	GK	Sebastián Cutler	20 May 2003 (age 23)	2	0	(United States Soccer Federation) Charlotte Independence
	GK	Kristian Figueroa	16 January 2003 (age 23)	0	0	Unknown
	GK	Anthony Martínez	23 December 2003 (age 22)	0	0	Unknown
	DF	Adrián Colón	23 August 2004 (age 22)	3	0	(German Football Association) 1. FC Kaiserslautern
	DF	Luis Cruz	3 November 2005 (age 21)	0	0	Unknown
	DF	Noah Escobar	17 January 2004 (age 22)	0	0	(United States Soccer Federation) Georgia Southern Eagles
	DF	Parker O'Ferral	18 December 2003 (age 22)	2	0	(United States Soccer Federation) North Carolina
	DF	Colby Quiñones	14 April 2003 (age 23)	2	0	(United States Soccer Federation) New England Revolution
	DF	Diego Rossi	19 May 2005 (age 21)	2	0	(United States Soccer Federation) New York City FC II
	DF	Pedro Alejandro Rivera	21 October 2003 (age 23)	2	0	Unknown
	MF	Jensen Cruz	12 August 2004 (age 22)	0	0	(United States Soccer Federation) Nomads
	MF	Andre Cutler	20 May 2003 (age 23)	0	0	(United States Soccer Federation) Marist Red Foxes
	MF	Antonio de la Torre	12 August 2005 (age 21)	2	0	Unknown
	MF	Brian Flores	25 August 2003 (age 23)	2	0	(United States Soccer Federation) New York City
	MF	Edwin Meléndez	25 April 2003 (age 23)	3	0	(United States Soccer Federation) Montclair State Red Hawks
	MF	Christian Miranda	5 May 2003 (age 23)	0	0	(United States Soccer Federation) Daytona State College
	MF	Wilfredo Rivera	14 October 2003 (age 23)	2	1	(United States Soccer Federation) Orlando City
	MF	Diego Ward	18 June 2004 (age 22)	2	0	Unknown
	FW	Daniel Cruz Jr.	14 May 2005 (age 21)	1	2	Unknown
15	FW	Lucas Borrilez	18 March 2003 (age 23)	0	0	Pepperdine University
	FW	Jan Mateo	31 January 2003 (age 23)	5	4	(Dominican Football Federation) Atlético San Cristóbal
	FW	Jeremy de León Rodríguez	18 March 2004 (age 22)	5	5	(Royal Spanish Football Federation) CD Castellón
	FW	Ian Silva	6 November 2004 (age 22)	2	0	(United States Soccer Federation) Orlando City
