= List of schools in Honduras =

This is a list of notable schools in Honduras, listed by department.

== Atlántida Department ==
- Mazapan School, La Ceiba

== Copán Department ==
- Mayatan Bilingual School, Copán Ruinas

== Cortés Department ==
- Albert Einstein International School of San Pedro Sula, San Pedro Sula
- Cofradia Bilingual School, Cofradia
- Escuela Internacional Sampedrana, San Pedro Sula

== Francisco Morazán Department ==
=== Tegucigalpa ===
- American School of Tegucigalpa
- DelCampo International School
- Discovery School, Tegucigalpa
- Harvest Christian Academy
- International School of Tegucigalpa
- Lycée Franco-Hondurien
