= 2022 CONCACAF U-20 Championship =

7th edition of the CONCACAF Under-20 Championship

Campeonato Sub-20 de la Concacaf 2022

Tournament details
- Host country: Honduras
- Dates: 18 June – 3 July
- Teams: 20 (from 1 confederation)
- Venues: 4 (in 2 host cities)

Final positions
- Champions: United States (3rd title)
- Runners-up: Dominican Republic

Tournament statistics
- Matches played: 39
- Goals scored: 151 (3.87 per match)
- Top scorer: (United States) Paxten Aaronson (7 goals)
- Best player: (United States) Paxten Aaronson
- Best goalkeeper: (United States) Christopher Brady
- Fair play award: Dominican Republic

The 2022 CONCACAF Under-20 Championship was the seventh edition of the CONCACAF Under-20 Championship (28th edition if all eras included), the men's under-20 international football tournament organized by CONCACAF. It was held in Honduras, in the cities of San Pedro Sula and Tegucigalpa.

On 16 September 2021, a new format was announced: the sixteen member associations ranked 1st to 16th would qualify for the group stage while the remaining nineteen member associations (all ranked 17th and below in the CONCACAF men’s under-20 rankings) would have to play in the 2022 CONCACAF U-20 Championship qualifying tournament to qualify for the knockout stage. The qualifying tournament took place from 5 to 13 November 2021 in Santo Domingo, Dominican Republic.

The competition determined not only the four CONCACAF representatives at the 2023 FIFA U-20 World Cup in Argentina and at the 2023 Pan American Games men's football tournament in Chile, but also the two CONCACAF representatives at the 2024 Summer Olympics in France.

The United States were the defending champions of the competition, since they were the champions in the 2018 edition and the 2020 edition was cancelled due to the COVID-19 pandemic. The United States once again successfully defended the title, defeating the biggest surprise of the tournament Dominican Republic 6–0 in the final for their third CONCACAF U-20 Championship title.

== Qualified teams ==
Twenty national teams participated in the tournament: the sixteen best ranked national teams (based on the CONCACAF men’s under-20 rankings), that qualified directly to the tournament, plus four national teams qualified through the 2021 CONCACAF U-20 Championship qualifying.

Round	Team	Qualification	Appearance	Previous best performance	Previous FIFA U-20 World Cup appearances
Group stage	United States (title holders)	1st ranked entrant	25th	Champions (2017, 2018)	16
Group stage	Mexico	2nd ranked entrant	27th	Champions (1962, 1970, 1973, 1974, 1976, 1978, 1980, 1984, 1990, 1992, 2011, 2013, 2015)	16
Group stage	Panama	3rd ranked entrant	12th	Runners-up (2015)	6
Group stage	Honduras (host)	4th ranked entrant	20th	Champions (1982, 1994)	8
Group stage	Costa Rica	5th ranked entrant	21st	Champions (1988, 2009)	9
Group stage	El Salvador	6th ranked entrant	18th	Champions (1964)	1
Group stage	Cuba	7th ranked entrant	14th	Runners-up (1970, 1974)	1
Group stage	Haiti	8th ranked entrant	10th	Second round (1978)	0
Group stage	Canada	9th ranked entrant	24th	Champions (1986, 1996)	8
Group stage	Trinidad and Tobago	10th ranked entrant	21st	Runners-up (1990)	2
Group stage	Guatemala	11th ranked entrant	20th	Runners-up (1962, 1973)	1
Group stage	Jamaica	12th ranked entrant	21st	Third place (1970)	1
Group stage	Antigua and Barbuda	13th ranked entrant	5th	First round (1980, 1986, 2017)	0
Group stage	Suriname	14th ranked entrant	7th	First round (1976, 1980, 1986, 1990, 2011, 2018)	0
Group stage	Saint Kitts and Nevis	15th ranked entrant	4th	First round (2007, 2017, 2018)	0
Group stage	Aruba	16th ranked entrant	3rd	First round (2015, 2018)	0
Knockout stage	Curaçao (Note: Includes appearances as the Netherlands Antilles.)	Qualifying Group A winner	14th	Third place (1962)	0
Knockout stage	Dominican Republic	Qualifying Group B winner	6th	Second round (1976)	0
Knockout stage	Puerto Rico	Qualifying Group C winner	9th	First round (1974, 1976, 1978, 1980, 1982, 1984, 2013, 2018)	0
Knockout stage	Nicaragua	Qualifying Group D winner	10th	Second round (1976)	0

== Venues ==
On 24 February 2022, CONCACAF confirmed three stadiums for the tournament.

During the competition, Estadio Yankel Rosenthal was used as a provisional venue due to problems with the playing pitch at Estadio Morazán caused by very heavy rainfall in San Pedro Sula. Some matches were relocated to the Estadio Olímpico Metropolitano and Estadio Yankel Rosenthal.

Location of the host cities of the 2022 CONCACAF U-20 Championship.	San Pedro Sula			Tegucigalpa
Location of the host cities of the 2022 CONCACAF U-20 Championship.	Estadio Olímpico Metropolitano	Estadio Morazán	Estadio Yankel Rosenthal	Estadio Nacional
Location of the host cities of the 2022 CONCACAF U-20 Championship.	Capacity: 37,325	Capacity: 18,000	Capacity: 5,500	Capacity: 35,000

== Squads ==
Players born on or after 1 January 2003 were eligible to compete. Each team had to register a squad of 20 players, two of whom had to be goalkeepers.

== Draw ==
The draw for the tournament was held on 3 March 2022, 12:00 AST (UTC−4), at the CONCACAF Headquarters in Miami, Florida. The 16 teams which entered the group stage were drawn into four groups of four teams. Based on the CONCACAF Men's Under-20 Ranking, the 16 teams were distributed into four pots, with teams in Pot 1 assigned to each group prior to the draw, as follows:

Pot 1	Pot 2	Pot 3	Pot 4
United States (Group E); Mexico (Group F); Panama (Group G); Honduras (Group H)	Costa Rica; El Salvador; Cuba; Haiti	Canada; Trinidad and Tobago; Guatemala; Jamaica	Antigua and Barbuda; Suriname; Saint Kitts and Nevis; Aruba

== Group stage ==
The top three teams in each group advanced to the round of 16, where they were joined by the four teams advancing from the 2021 CONCACAF U-20 Championship qualifying.

Tiebreakers

The ranking of teams in each group was determined as follows (Regulations Article 12.7):

1. Points obtained in all group matches (three points for a win, one for a draw, zero for a loss).
2. Goal difference in all group matches.
3. Number of goals scored in all group matches.
4. Points obtained in the matches played between the teams in question.
5. Goal difference in the matches played between the teams in question.
6. Number of goals scored in the matches played between the teams in question.
7. Fair play points in all group matches (only one deduction could be applied to a player in a single match):
  - Yellow card: −1 point
  - Indirect red card (second yellow card): −3 points
  - Direct red card: −4 points
  - Yellow card and direct red card: −5 points
8. Drawing of lots.

All times are local, CST (UTC−6).

=== Group E ===
Pos	Team	Pld	W	D	L	GF	GA	GD	Pts	Qualification
1	United States	3	2	1	0	15	2	+13	7	Knockout stage
2	Cuba	3	2	0	1	7	3	+4	6	Knockout stage
3	Canada	3	1	1	1	6	3	+3	4	Knockout stage
4	Saint Kitts and Nevis	3	0	0	3	0	20	−20	0	

Source: CONCACAF
Rules for classification: Group stage tiebreakers
18 June 2022
14:00

United States	10–0	Saint Kitts and Nevis
Cowell 18' (pen.); Clark 32' (pen.); Wolff 44'; Pukštas 45+1'; Cuevas 45+3'; Tsakiris 45+8' (pen.), 70'; Chiuta 48' (o.g.); Aaronson 64', 68'	Report

Estadio Nacional, Tegucigalpa
Attendance: 110
Referee: Ricardo Montero (Costa Rica)
18 June 2022
18:30

Cuba	1–0	Canada
Martín 42'	Report

Estadio Nacional, Tegucigalpa
Referee: Saíd Martínez (Honduras)

20 June 2022
14:00

Saint Kitts and Nevis	0–6	Cuba
	Report	Martín 18'; Hernández 61'; Penalver 73'; Mills 78' (o.g.); Torrez 79'; Rodríguez 90'

Estadio Nacional, Tegucigalpa
Referee: Daneon Parchment (Jamaica)
20 June 2022
18:30

Canada	2–2	United States
Wright 15'; Halliday 69' (o.g.)	Report	McGlynn 53'; Cowell 72'

Estadio Nacional, Tegucigalpa
Referee: Marco Ortíz (Mexico)

22 June 2022
14:00

Canada	4–0	Saint Kitts and Nevis
Catavolo 59', 65'; Wright 78'; Henry 80'	Report

Estadio Nacional, Tegucigalpa
Referee: Oshane Nation (Jamaica)
22 June 2022
18:30

United States	3–0	Cuba
Sullivan 2', 8', 43'	Report

Estadio Nacional, Tegucigalpa
Referee: Selvin Brown (Honduras)

=== Group F ===
Pos	Team	Pld	W	D	L	GF	GA	GD	Pts	Qualification
1	Mexico	3	2	1	0	13	0	+13	7	Knockout stage
2	Haiti	3	1	2	0	7	4	+3	5	Knockout stage
3	Trinidad and Tobago	3	1	1	1	7	9	−2	4	Knockout stage
4	Suriname	3	0	0	3	0	14	−14	0	

Source: CONCACAF
Rules for classification: Group stage tiebreakers
19 June 2022
16:00

Haiti	4–4	Trinidad and Tobago
Leazard 30'; Jeudy 45' (pen.), 53'; Destin 90'	Report	James 2', 72'; Thomas 42'; Gill 70'

Estadio Morazán, San Pedro Sula
Referee: Rubiel Vázquez (United States)
19 June 2022
20:30

Mexico	8–0	Suriname
Lozano 13'; Mariscal 23', 25', 87'; Ambríz 33'; González 45+1'; Leone 90+3'; Hernández 90+13'	Report

Estadio Morazán, San Pedro Sula
Referee: Reon Radix (Grenada)

21 June 2022
16:00

Suriname	0–3	Haiti
	Report	Jeudy 48', 59'; Belizaire 63'

Estadio Morazán, San Pedro Sula
Referee: Randy Encarnación (Dominican Republic)
21 June 2022
20:30

Trinidad and Tobago	0–5	Mexico
	Report	Leone 28'; González 45+2'; Lozano 48' (pen.), 80'; J. Pérez 53'

Estadio Morazán, San Pedro Sula
Referee: Drew Fischer (Canada)

23 June 2022
16:00

Trinidad and Tobago	3–0	Suriname
James 64', 88'; Khan 84'	Report

Estadio Olímpico Metropolitano, San Pedro Sula
Referee: Bryan López (Guatemala)
23 June 2022
20:30

Mexico	0–0	Haiti
	Report

Estadio Olímpico Metropolitano, San Pedro Sula
Referee: Walter López (Guatemala)

=== Group G ===
Pos	Team	Pld	W	D	L	GF	GA	GD	Pts	Qualification
1	El Salvador	3	2	1	0	9	2	+7	7	Knockout stage
2	Guatemala	3	2	0	1	6	7	−1	6	Knockout stage
3	Panama	3	1	1	1	6	3	+3	4	Knockout stage
4	Aruba	3	0	0	3	2	11	−9	0	

Source: CONCACAF
Rules for classification: Group stage tiebreakers
19 June 2022
14:00

El Salvador	5–1	Guatemala
Romero 15'; Recinos 35' (o.g.); Gil 61'; Osorio 65'; Cruz 86'	Report	Ordoñez 58'

Estadio Nacional, Tegucigalpa
Referee: Selvin Brown (Honduras)
19 June 2022
18:30

Panama	5–0	Aruba
Betegón 7', 31'; Garrido 42'; Tejada 59'; Rivera 64'	Report

Estadio Nacional, Tegucigalpa
Referee: Oshane Nation (Jamaica)

21 June 2022
14:00

Aruba	1–4	El Salvador
Monsanto 11'	Report	Esquivel 45+4' (pen.); Rivas 53'; Mariona 76', 84'

Estadio Nacional, Tegucigalpa
Referee: Luis Enrique Santander (Mexico)
21 June 2022
18:30

Guatemala	3–1	Panama
Juárez 17'; Ordoñez 45+3'; Santos 69'	Report	Tejada 35'

Estadio Nacional, Tegucigalpa
Referee: Keylor Herrera (Costa Rica)

23 June 2022
14:00

Guatemala	2–1	Aruba
Ordoñez 18'; Juárez 54'	Report	E. Nedd 14'

Estadio Nacional, Tegucigalpa
Referee: Ricardo Montero (Costa Rica)
23 June 2022
18:30

Panama	0–0	El Salvador
	Report

Estadio Nacional, Tegucigalpa
Referee: Marco Ortíz (Mexico)

=== Group H ===
Pos	Team	Pld	W	D	L	GF	GA	GD	Pts	Qualification
1	Honduras (H)	3	3	0	0	9	0	+9	9	Knockout stage
2	Costa Rica	3	1	1	1	4	2	+2	4	Knockout stage
3	Jamaica	3	1	1	1	3	6	−3	4	Knockout stage
4	Antigua and Barbuda	3	0	0	3	0	8	−8	0	

Source: CONCACAF
Rules for classification: Group stage tiebreakers
(H) Hosts
18 June 2022
16:00

Costa Rica	1–1	Jamaica
Rodríguez 58'	Report	Clarke 90+8' (pen.)

Estadio Morazán, San Pedro Sula
Referee: Iván Barton (El Salvador)
18 June 2022
20:30

Honduras	3–0	Antigua and Barbuda
Zúñiga 31'; Macías 71'; Aceituno 84' (pen.)	Report

Estadio Morazán, San Pedro Sula
Referee: Walter López (Guatemala)

20 June 2022
16:00

Antigua and Barbuda	0–3	Costa Rica
	Report	Calderón 48'; Escoe 78'; Rodríguez 89'

Estadio Morazán, San Pedro Sula
Referee: Bryan López (Guatemala)
20 June 2022
20:30

Jamaica	0–5	Honduras
	Report	Aceituno 3', 35'; Castillo 48'; Macías 58', 85'

Estadio Morazán, San Pedro Sula
Referee: José Torres (Puerto Rico)

22 June 2022
13:00

Jamaica	2–0	Antigua and Barbuda
Scarlett 41'; Clarke 81' (pen.)	Report

Estadio Yankel Rosenthal, San Pedro Sula
Referee: Rubiel Vázquez (United States)
22 June 2022
15:30

Honduras	1–0	Costa Rica
Contreras 59' (pen.)	Report

Estadio Yankel Rosenthal, San Pedro Sula
Referee: Reon Radix (Grenada)

== Knockout stage ==
In the knockout stage, if a match was level at the end of normal playing time, extra time was played (two periods of 15 minutes each) and followed, if necessary, by a penalty shoot-out to determine the winners.

=== Qualified directly to the knockout stage ===
Qualified from 2022 CONCACAF U-20 Championship qualifying

- Curaçao (Qualifying Group A winner)
- Dominican Republic (Qualifying Group B winner)
- Puerto Rico (Qualifying Group C winner)
- Nicaragua (Qualifying Group D winner)

=== Bracket ===
Round of 16
25 June – Tegucigalpa
United States	5
Nicaragua	0
25 June – San Pedro Sula (Yankel R.)
Costa Rica	4
Trinidad and Tobago	1
25 June – Tegucigalpa
Cuba	0
Panama	1
25 June – San Pedro Sula (Yankel R.)
Honduras	4
Curaçao	1
26 June – Tegucigalpa
El Salvador	4
Dominican Republic	5
26 June – San Pedro Sula (Olímpico M.)
Haiti	1
Jamaica	2
26 June – Tegucigalpa
Guatemala (p)	1 (4)
Canada	1 (3)
26 June – San Pedro Sula (Olímpico M.)
Mexico	6
Puerto Rico	0

Quarter-finals
28 June – San Pedro Sula (Francisco M.)
United States	2
Costa Rica	0
28 June – San Pedro Sula (Francisco M.)
Panama	1
Honduras	2
29 June – San Pedro Sula (Olímpico M.)
Dominican Republic	1
Jamaica	0
29 June – San Pedro Sula (Olímpico M.)
Guatemala (p)	1 (2)
Mexico	1 (1)

Semi-finals
1 July – San Pedro Sula (Francisco M.)
United States	3
Honduras	0
1 July – San Pedro Sula (Francisco M.)
Dominican Republic (p)	2 (4)
Guatemala	2 (2)

Final
3 July – San Pedro Sula (Olímpico M.)
United States	6
Dominican Republic	0

=== Round of 16 ===
25 June 2022
12:00

Costa Rica	4–1	Trinidad and Tobago
Alcócer 17' (pen.); Johnson 63'; Rodríguez 68', 78'	Report	Khan 87'

Estadio Yankel Rosenthal, San Pedro Sula
Referee: José Torres (Puerto Rico)

25 June 2022
14:00

Cuba	0–1	Panama
	Report	Rivera 66'

Estadio Nacional, Tegucigalpa
Referee: Luis Enrique Santander (Mexico)

25 June 2022
15:00

Honduras	4–1	Curaçao
Aceituno 4'; Rodas 45+2'; Ramos 58'; Carrasco 85' (pen.)	Report	Job 11'

Estadio Yankel Rosenthal, San Pedro Sula
Referee: Drew Fischer (Canada)

25 June 2022
18:30

United States	5–0	Nicaragua
Sullivan 45+2', 65'; Luna 56' (pen.); Pineda 73' (o.g.); Neal 87'	Report

Estadio Nacional, Tegucigalpa
Referee: Keylor Herrera (Costa Rica)

26 June 2022
14:00

Guatemala	1–1 (a.e.t.)	Canada
Villagrán 120'	Report	Habibullah 100' (pen.)
Penalties
Santos (penalty scored); Urizar (penalty scored); Franco (penalty scored); Bantes (penalty missed); Villagrán (penalty scored)	4–3	(penalty scored) Pellegrino; (penalty missed) Poku; (penalty scored) Ferdinand; (penalty missed) Smith; (penalty scored) Habibullah

Estadio Nacional, Tegucigalpa
Referee: Daneon Parchment (Jamaica)

26 June 2022
16:00

Haiti	1–2	Jamaica
Jeudy 50'	Report	Clarke 4'; Ximines 84'

Estadio Olímpico Metropolitano, San Pedro Sula
Referee: Iván Barton (El Salvador)

26 June 2022
18:30

El Salvador	4–5	Dominican Republic
Gil 9', 37' (pen.); Arévalo 43'; Esquivel 57' (pen.)	Report	Boatwright 6'; Gomez 13'; Montes de Oca 47', 60'; Azcona 78' (pen.)

Estadio Nacional, Tegucigalpa
Referee: Saíd Martínez (Honduras)

26 June 2022
20:30

Mexico	6–0	Puerto Rico
Ambríz 24'; Torres 33'; Lozano 49'; Mariscal 53'; Violante 71'; Hernández 79'	Report

Estadio Olímpico Metropolitano, San Pedro Sula
Referee: Randy Encarnación (Dominican Republic)

=== Quarter-finals ===
The quarter-final winners qualified for the 2023 FIFA U-20 World Cup.

28 June 2022
17:00

United States	2–0	Costa Rica
Aaronson 5', 49'	Report

Estadio Morazán, San Pedro Sula
Referee: Oshane Nation (Jamaica)

28 June 2022
20:00

Panama	1–2	Honduras
Gorday 22'	Report	Aceituno 43', 74' (pen.)

Estadio Morazán, San Pedro Sula
Referee: Marco Ortíz (Mexico)

29 June 2022
17:00

Dominican Republic	1–0	Jamaica
Montes de Oca 10'	Report

Estadio Olímpico Metropolitano, San Pedro Sula
Referee: Reon Radix (Grenada)

29 June 2022
20:00

Guatemala	1–1 (a.e.t.)	Mexico
Ordoñez 39'	Report	Lozano 74'
Penalties
Gaitán (penalty scored); Cardoza (penalty scored); Santos (penalty missed); Bantes (penalty missed)	2–1	(penalty missed) Hernández; (penalty missed) Violante; (penalty missed) Leone; (penalty scored) Alcántar; (penalty missed) González

Estadio Olímpico Metropolitano, San Pedro Sula
Referee: Saíd Martínez (Honduras)

=== Semi-finals ===
Winners qualified for the 2024 Summer Olympic men's football tournament.

1 July 2022
16:00

Dominican Republic	2–2 (a.e.t.)	Guatemala
De Peña 62'; Azcona 64'	Report	Ordoñez 23'; Mañón 29' (o.g.)
Penalties
Jungbauer (penalty scored); Montes de Oca (penalty missed); Azcona (penalty scored); De Peña (penalty scored); María (penalty scored)	4–2	(penalty missed) Gaitán; (penalty scored) Cardoza; (penalty scored) Franco; (penalty missed) Ordoñez

Estadio Morazán, San Pedro Sula
Referee: Daneon Parchment (Jamaica)

1 July 2022
19:00

United States	3–0	Honduras
Aaronson 3'; Alvarado Jr. 22'; Sullivan 43'	Report

Estadio Morazán, San Pedro Sula
Attendance: 16,500
Referee: Iván Barton (El Salvador)

=== Final ===
3 July 2022
18:00

United States	6–0	Dominican Republic
Wolff 17'; Aaronson 37', 56'; Allen 39'; McGlynn 53'; Tsakiris 61'	Report

Estadio Olímpico Metropolitano, San Pedro Sula
Attendance: 100
Referee: Drew Fischer (Canada)

== Awards ==
The following awards were given at the conclusion of the tournament.

Award	Player
Golden Ball	(United States) Paxten Aaronson
Golden Boot	(United States) Paxten Aaronson (7 goals)
Golden Glove	(United States) Christopher Brady
Fair Play Award	Dominican Republic

Best XI
Goalkeeper	Defenders	Midfielders	Forwards
(United States) Christopher Brady	(United States) Jalen Neal; (Honduras) Aaron Zúñiga; (Mexico) Antonio Leone	(Dominican Republic) Edison Azcona; (Guatemala) Arquimides Ordonez; (United States) Paxten Aaronson; (United States) Quinn Sullivan	(Honduras) Marco Aceituno; (Mexico) Esteban Lozano; (Dominican Republic) Ángel Montes de Oca

== Goalscorers ==
There were 151 goals scored in 39 matches, for an average of 3.87 goals per match.

7 goals

- (United States) Paxten Aaronson

6 goals

- (Honduras) Marco Aceituno
- (United States) Quinn Sullivan

5 goals

- (Guatemala) Arquimides Ordoñez
- (Haiti) Steevenson Jeudy
- (Mexico) Esteban Lozano

4 goals

- (Costa Rica) Dorian Rodríguez
- (Mexico) Salvador Mariscal
- (Trinidad and Tobago) Nathaniel James

3 goals

- (Dominican Republic) Ángel Montes de Oca
- (El Salvador) Mayer Gil
- (Honduras) Jefryn Macías
- (Jamaica) Jahmari Clarke
- (United States) Niko Tsakiris

2 goals

- (Canada) Matthew Catavolo
- (Canada) Lowell Wright
- (Cuba) Kevin Martín
- (Dominican Republic) Edison Azcona
- (El Salvador) Jonathan Esquivel
- (El Salvador) Javier Mariona
- (Guatemala) Allan Juárez
- (Mexico) Fidel Ambríz
- (Mexico) Bryan González
- (Mexico) Jesús Hernández
- (Mexico) Tony Leone
- (Panama) Javier Betegón
- (Panama) Carlos Rivera
- (Panama) Leonel Tejada
- (Trinidad and Tobago) Molik Khan
- (United States) Cade Cowell
- (United States) Jack McGlynn
- (United States) Tyler Wolff

1 goal

- (Aruba) Terick Monsanto
- (Aruba) Evander Nedd
- (Canada) Kamron Habibullah
- (Canada) Maël Henry
- (Costa Rica) Josimar Alcócer
- (Costa Rica) Brandon Calderón
- (Costa Rica) Enyel Escoe
- (Costa Rica) Shawn Johnson
- (Cuba) Eduardo Hernández
- (Cuba) Mario Penalver
- (Cuba) Rey Rodríguez
- (Cuba) Romario Torrez
- (Curaçao) Rayvian Job
- (Dominican Republic) Israel Boatwright
- (Dominican Republic) Guillermo de Peña
- (Dominican Republic) Anyelo Gomez
- (El Salvador) Ronald Arévalo
- (El Salvador) Daniel Cruz
- (El Salvador) Harold Osorio
- (El Salvador) Eduardo Rivas
- (El Salvador) Alexander Romero
- (Guatemala) Carlos Santos
- (Guatemala) Omar Villagrán
- (Haiti) Adelson Belizaire
- (Haiti) Bryan Destin
- (Haiti) Watz Leazard
- (Honduras) Miguel Carrasco
- (Honduras) Isaac Castillo
- (Honduras) Jeyson Contreras
- (Honduras) Odin Ramos
- (Honduras) Geremy Rodas
- (Honduras) Aaron Zúñiga
- (Jamaica) Zion Scarlett
- (Jamaica) Tarick Ximines
- (Mexico) Jonathan Pérez
- (Mexico) Christian Torres
- (Mexico) Isaías Violante
- (Panama) Kevin Garrido
- (Panama) Ricardo Gorday
- (Trinidad and Tobago) Real Gill
- (Trinidad and Tobago) Kaihim Thomas
- (United States) Noah Allen
- (United States) Alejandro Alvarado Jr.
- (United States) Caden Clark
- (United States) Mauricio Cuevas
- (United States) Diego Luna
- (United States) Jalen Neal
- (United States) Rokas Pukštas

1 own goal

- (Dominican Republic) Sebastián Mañón (against Guatemala)
- (Guatemala) Arian Recinos (against El Salvador)
- (Nicaragua) Dylan Pineda (against United States)
- (Saint Kitts and Nevis) Jermaine Chiuta (against United States)
- (Saint Kitts and Nevis) Ajani Mills (against Cuba)
- (United States) Michael Halliday (against Canada)

Source: CONCACAF

== Qualification for international tournaments ==
=== Qualified teams for the 2023 FIFA U-20 World Cup ===
The following four teams from CONCACAF qualified for the 2023 FIFA U-20 World Cup in Argentina.

Team	Qualified on	Previous appearances in FIFA U-20 World Cup
United States	28 June 2022	16 (1981, 1983, 1987, 1989, 1993, 1997, 1999, 2001, 2003, 2005, 2007, 2009, 2013, 2015, 2017, 2019)
Honduras	28 June 2022	8 (1977, 1995, 1999, 2005, 2009, 2015, 2017, 2019)
Dominican Republic	29 June 2022	0 (debut)
Guatemala	29 June 2022	1 (2011)

=== Qualified teams for the 2024 Summer Olympics ===
Unlike the previous editions, the tournament also served as qualifier for the 2024 Summer Olympic men's football tournament. This was changed from the previous set-up where the CONCACAF representatives qualify for the Olympic football tournament through their Pre-Olympic Tournament.

The following two teams from CONCACAF qualified for the 2024 Summer Olympic men's football tournament in France.

Team	Qualified on	Previous appearances in Summer Olympics^{1}
Dominican Republic	1 July 2022	0 (debut)
United States	1 July 2022	14 (1904, 1924, 1928, 1936, 1948, 1952, 1956, 1972, 1984, 1988, 1992, 1996, 2000, 2008)

^{1} Italic indicates hosts for that year.

=== Qualified teams for the 2023 Pan American Games ===
The champion team and the top team from each of the three CONCACAF zones, i.e., Caribbean (CFU), Central American (UNCAF), and North American (NAFU), qualified for the 2023 Pan American Games men's football tournament.

The following four teams from CONCACAF qualified for the 2023 Pan American Games men's football tournament in Chile.

Team	Zone	Qualified on	Previous appearances in Pan American Games^{2}
Dominican Republic	CFU	29 June 2022	3 (1971, 1979, 2003)
United States	NAFU	29 June 2022	12 (1959, 1963, 1967, 1971, 1975, 1979, 1983, 1987, **1991**, 1995, 1999, 2007)
Honduras	UNCAF	1 July 2022	5 (1991, 1995, 1999, 2007, 2019)
Mexico	NAFU	3 July 2022	15 (1955, 1959, **1967**, 1971, **1975**, 1983, 1987, 1991, 1995, **1999**, 2003, 2007, **2011**, 2015, 2019)

^{2} Bold indicates champions for that year. Italic indicates hosts for that year.

== Notes ==
At the end of the match between the United States and Costa Rica, violent and unsportsmanlike actions were reported. The Costa Rican Football Federation has been sanctioned with a fine and nine of its players were temporarily suspended due to infraction of the Competition Regulations and the FIFA Disciplinary Code. Likewise, one U.S. player was suspended and banned for the remainder of the competition.

== Sponsors ==
- Qatar Airways
- Zambos
- Nike, Inc.
- Scotiabank
