= Harvest Christian Academy =

Harvest Christian Academy may refer to:

- Harvest Christian Academy, Ghana
- Harvest Christian Academy (Guam)
- Harvest Christian Academy (Honduras)
- Harvest Christian Academy (Illinois)

== See also ==
- Harvest Time Christian Academy, Texas
- Harvest Christian School (est. 2000), Kadina, South Australia
