= Marco Aceituno =

Honduran footballer (born 2003)

Personal information
- Full name: Marco Tulio Aceituno Mejia
- Date of birth: 28 December 2003 (age 22)
- Place of birth: Cofradía, Honduras
- Height: 1.72 m (5 ft 8 in)
- Position: Winger

Team information
- Current team: Real España
- Number: 26

Senior career*
Years	Team	Apps	(Gls)
2021–	Real España	20	(3)

International career^{‡}
2022–	Honduras U20	6	(6)
- * Club domestic league appearances and goals as of 29 January 2023 ‡ National team caps and goals as of 1 July 2022

Marco Tulio Aceituno Mejia (born 28 December 2003) is a Honduran professional footballer who plays as a winger for Real España.

== Career statistics ==
=== Club ===
As of 29 January 2023

Club	Division	League			Cup		Continental		Total	
Club	Division	Season	Apps	Goals	Apps	Goals	Apps	Goals	Apps	Goals
Real España	Liga Nacional	2021-22	7	2	0	0	—		7	2
Real España	Liga Nacional	2022-23	13	1	0	0	—		13	1
Career total			20	3	0	0	0	0	20	3

== Honours ==
Individual

- CONCACAF U-20 Championship Best XI: 2022
