= Jonathan Franco =

Guatemalan footballer (born 2003)

Personal information
- Full name: Jonathan Francisco Franco González
- Date of birth: 26 July 2003 (age 23)
- Place of birth: Guatemala City, Guatemala
- Height: 1.77 m (5 ft 10 in)
- Position: Defensive midfielder

Team information
- Current team: Municipal
- Number: 18

Youth career
- Municipal

Senior career*
Years	Team	Apps	(Gls)
2021–	Municipal	85	(3)

International career^{‡}
2019	Guatemala U17	1	(0)
2022–2023	Guatemala U20	9	(0)
2023	Guatemala U23	3	(1)
2024–	Guatemala	29	(0)
- * Club domestic league appearances and goals as of 19:21, 26 June 2025 (UTC) ‡ National team caps and goals as of 19:21, 7 June 2026 (UTC)

Jonathan Francisco Franco González (born 26 July 2003) is a Guatemalan professional footballer who plays as a defensive midfielder for Liga Guate club Municipal and the Guatemala national team.

== Career ==
Franco began his senior career with Municipal in 2021, and in 2023 was named their captain. He helped Municipal win the Clausura 2024.

== International career ==
Franco was part of the Guatemala U20s at the 2022 CONCACAF U-20 Championship. The following year, he again represented the U20s at the 2023 FIFA U-20 World Cup where he was the captain. He was called up to the Guatemala U23s at the 2023 Central American and Caribbean Games. Franco was called up to the senior Guatemala national team for the 2025 CONCACAF Gold Cup.

== Honours ==
Municipal

- Liga Nacional de Fútbol de Guatemala: Clausura 2024
- Copa Campeón de Campeones de Guatemala: 2024
