= Watz-Landy Leazard =

Haitian footballer (born 2003)

Watz Leazard
Personal information
- Full name: Watz Landy Leazard
- Date of birth: 17 June 2003 (age 23)
- Place of birth: Cap-Haïtien, Haiti
- Height: 1.88 m (6 ft 2 in)
- Positions: Forward; winger

Team information
- Current team: Van Hien University
- Number: 70

Youth career
- Real Hope FA

Senior career*
Years	Team	Apps	(Gls)
2021–2022	Real Hope FA	12	(6)
2023	Tulsa	1	(0)
2023–2024	Khanh Hoa	20	(4)
2024–2025	Real Hope FA		
2026–	Van Hien University	9	(3)

International career^{‡}
2022	Haiti U20	4	(1)
- * Club domestic league appearances and goals as of 4 June 2026 ‡ National team caps and goals as of 27 June 2022

Watz Landy Leazard (born 17 June 2003) is a Haitian professional footballer who plays as a forward or winger for V.League 2 club Van Hien University.

== Club career ==
Leazard was a youth product of the Haitian-based Real Hope Football Academy. In January 2023, he joined USL Championship side Tulsa. He made his only appearance for the team in a 0–1 US Open Cup defeat against Tulsa Athletic on 6 April 2023.

In October 2023, Leazard signed for V.League 1 club Khanh Hoa, signing a one-year contract. On 22 December 2023, he scored a brace to help Khanh Hoa defeat the league defending champion Hanoi Police in a 2–1 score. At the end of the season, Khanh Hoa finished last in the league, resulting in Leazard's departure.

== International career ==
With Haiti U20, Leazard took part in the 2022 CONCACAF U-20 Championship. During the tournament, he scored a goal (against Trinidad and Tobago) and assisted twice as Haiti was eliminated in the Round of 16 by Jamaica.
