= Cofradia Bilingual School =

Location
- Cofradia, San Pedro Sula; Honduras
- Coordinates: 15.40789°N 88.15980°W

Information
- Established: 1997
- Enrollment: 300

Cofradia Bilingual School is a bilingual (English/Spanish) school located in the town of Cofradia, located 20 minutes away from San Pedro Sula, in Honduras. It was founded in 1997.

The school teaches children from preschool up to grade 11 with a team of volunteer teachers from around the globe and a few local Honduran teachers.
