= Humberto Ramos (footballer) =

Brazilian footballer (born 1949)

Personal information
- Full name: Humberto da Silva Ramos
- Date of birth: 25 August 1949 (age 77)
- Place of birth: Belo Horizonte, Brazil
- Height: 1.73 m (5 ft 8 in)
- Position: Midfielder

Senior career*
| Years | Team | Apps | (Gls) |
| 1968–1973 | Atlético Mineiro | | |
| 1973–1974 | Grêmio | | |
| 1975 | América de Natal | | |
| 1976 | Atlético Mineiro | | |
| 1977 | Vila Nova | | |
| 1978–1979 | Inter de Limeira | | |
| 1979–1980 | Colorado-PR | | |
| 1984 | Valerio | | |

Managerial career
- 1999–2000: Atlético Mineiro
- 2000: Marcílio Dias
- 2001: Avaí
- 2002: Joinville
- 2004: Vila Nova
- 2004: Pelotas
- 2009: Villa Nova
- 2010: Brasília
- * Club domestic league appearances and goals

Humberto Ramos (born 25 August 1949) is a Brazilian former professional footballer and manager, who played as a midfielder.

== Playing career ==
A Dribbling central midfielder, Ramos was responsible for initiating the play for Dadá Maravilha's goal against Botafogo FR, in the final triangular of the 1971 Campeonato Brasileiro Série A, which yielded the first national title in the club's history. He made 110 appearances for Atlético Mineiro, scoring 12 goals. He also had spells at Grêmio, where he played 75 matches and scored 11 goals, América de Natal, Vila Nova, Inter de Limeira, Colorado and Valeriodoce.

== Managerial career ==
Ramos started his career in an unexpected way. Working as a director at Atlético Mineiro, he took over the club after the dismissal of Darío Pereyra, and finished as runner-up in the 1999 Campeonato Brasileiro Série A. Ramos, by the way, blames the referee Márcio Rezende de Freitas for the loss of the title, by not marking a penalty committed by the right-back of Corinthians, Indio. After this curious episode, Ramos worked on some other teams such as Avaí and Joinville. He was also a sports commentator until he retired from football.

== Honours ==
Atlético Mineiro

- Campeonato Brasileiro: 1971
- Campeonato Mineiro: 1970
- Taça Belo Horizonte: 1971, 1972
