= Harvest Time Christian Academy =

Location
- 17199 FM 2493; Flint, Texas 75762; United States; 32.231005°N 95.348711°W

Information
- Type: Private
- Administrator: Matt Gregory
- Principal: Tierini Wilkinson
- Grades: Pre-K – 12
- Student to teacher ratio: 10:1
- Website: http://www.tylerchristianschools.org

Harvest Time Christian Academy is a coeducational, private Christian school located in Tyler, Texas. Founded in 2010, the school operates as a ministry of Harvest Time Church.

== Academics ==
The school describes its educational program as integrating academic instruction with Christian religious education. HTCA uses the Accelerated Christian Education program. Each year, all students take the Stanford Achievement Test Series in order to assess academic achievement.

In addition to their regular course of study, students participate in many activities throughout the year including field trips, art classes, music lessons, chapel services, choral performances, and community service projects.
