= Jesús Hernández (footballer, born 2004) =

Mexican footballer

Personal information
- Full name: Jesús Hernández Moreno
- Date of birth: 9 January 2004 (age 22)
- Place of birth: Querétaro, Mexico
- Height: 1.84 m (6 ft 0 in)
- Position: Forward

Team information
- Current team: Tapatío
- Number: 57

Senior career*
| Years | Team | Apps | (Gls) |
| 2021–2025 | Querétaro | 8 | (0) |
| 2023–2024 | → Elche Ilicitano (loan) | 27 | (10) |
| 2025–2026 | Tijuana | 2 | (1) |
| 2025 | → Sinaloa (loan) | 10 | (2) |
| 2026 | → Tapatío (loan) | 22 | (5) |
| 2026 | → Guadalajara (loan) | 3 | (0) |
| 2026– | Guadalajara | 0 | (0) |

International career^{‡}
| 2019 | Mexico U15 | 2 | (0) |
| 2021 | Mexico U19 | 4 | (2) |
| 2021–2022 | Mexico U20 | 8 | (2) |
| 2023– | Mexico U23 | 5 | (0) |
Medal record
Men's football
Representing Mexico
Toulon Tournament
| Second place | 2023 France | Team |
- * Club domestic league appearances and goals as of 21 November 2026 ‡ National team caps and goals as of 18 June 2023

Jesús Hernández Moreno (born 9 January 2004) is a Mexican professional footballer who plays as a forward for Liga de Expansión MX club Tapatío. He was included in The Guardian's "Next Generation" list for 2021.

== Club career ==
=== Querétaro ===
Hernández made his professional debut with Querétaro under manager Héctor Altamirano on 17 August 2021 in a Liga MX match against Tigres UANL, coming on as a substitute.

== International career ==
Hernández was part of the under-20 side that competed at the 2021 Revelations Cup, where Mexico won the competition. In June 2022, he was named into the final 20-man roster for the CONCACAF Under-20 Championship, in which Mexico failed to qualify for the FIFA U-20 World Cup and Olympics.

== Career statistics ==
=== Club ===
As of match played on 24 October 2026

| Club | Season | League | | | Cup | | Continental | | Other | | Total | |
| Club | Season | Division | Apps | Goals | Apps | Goals | Apps | Goals | Apps | Goals | Apps | Goals |
|---|---|---|---|---|---|---|---|---|---|---|---|---|
| Querétaro | 2021–22 | Liga MX | 4 | 0 | — | | — | | — | | 4 | 0 |
| Querétaro | 2025–26 | Liga MX | 4 | 0 | — | | — | | 3 (Note: Appearance in Leagues Cup) | 0 | 7 | 0 |
| Querétaro | Total | | 8 | 0 | — | | — | | 3 | 0 | 8 | 0 |
| Elche Ilicitano (loan) | 2022–23 | Tercera Federación | 12 | 2 | — | | — | | — | | 12 | 2 |
| Elche Ilicitano (loan) | 2023–24 | Tercera Federación | 15 | 8 | — | | — | | — | | 15 | 8 |
| Elche Ilicitano (loan) | Total | | 27 | 10 | — | | — | | — | | 27 | 10 |
| Tijuana | 2024–25 | Liga MX | 2 | 1 | — | | — | | 1 | 0 | 3 | 1 |
| Sinaloa (loan) | 2024–25 | Liga de Expansión MX | 10 | 2 | — | | — | | — | | 10 | 2 |
| Tapatío (loan) | 2025–26 | Liga de Expansión MX | 15 | 2 | — | | — | | — | | 15 | 2 |
| Tapatío (loan) | 2026–27 | Liga de Expansión MX | 7 | 3 | — | | — | | — | | 7 | 3 |
| Tapatío (loan) | Total | | 22 | 5 | — | | — | | — | | 22 | 5 |
| Guadalajara (loan) | 2026–27 | Liga MX | 3 | 0 | — | | — | | — | | 3 | 0 |
| Career total | | | 72 | 18 | 0 | 0 | 0 | 0 | 4 | 0 | 76 | 18 |

== Honours ==
Mexico U20

- Revelations Cup: 2021
