= Harvest Christian School =

Harvest Christian College
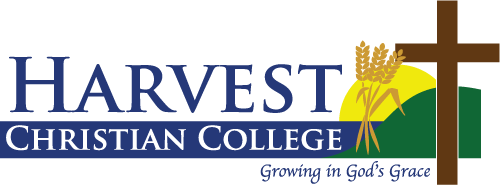

Location
- Pannan Street; Kadina, South Australia, 5554; Australia
- Coordinates: 33°57′27″S 137°42′42″E

Information
- Denomination: Interdenominational
- Opened: 2000
- Principal: Paquita Ruch (2000–2010); Sandra Jesshope (2011–2015); Gerhard van Blommestein (2015–2017); Peter Ayoub (2017–current)
- Grades: Foundation to Year 12
- Gender: Mixed
- Slogan: Growing In God's Grace
- Website: https://www.harvest.sa.edu.au/

Harvest Christian College is an interdenominational Christian school located in Kadina, South Australia. Originally called Harvest Christian School, the name was changed in 2016. It serves over 300 students from reception to year 12. The school is affiliated with Christian Schools Australia (CSA) Ltd. and the Association of Independent Schools of South Australia and is registered with the Non-Government Schools Registration Board.

The Copper Triangle Christian School Association was officially formed on 3 February 1997. Almost three years later, on 31 January 2000, Harvest Christian School opened its doors to students for the first time.

In 2025, fees were approximately $2500-$3000 per year for Years 1-10 and $3100-$3500 per year for Years 11 and 12.
