= Alexander Romero =

Salvadoran professional footballer

Personal information
- Full name: Alexander Cruz Romero-Yakubik
- Date of birth: September 24, 2004 (age 22)
- Place of birth: Henderson, Nevada, U.S.
- Height: 1.78 m (5 ft 10 in)
- Position: Defensive midfielder

Team information
- Current team: Las Vegas Lights FC
- Number: 77

Senior career*
Years	Team	Apps	(Gls)
2022–	Las Vegas Lights FC	21	(0)

International career^{‡}
2022	El Salvador U20	4	(0)
- * Club domestic league appearances and goals as of November 15, 2024 ‡ National team caps and goals as of June 18, 2024

Alexander "Zander" Cruz Romero-Yakubik (born September 24, 2004) is a professional footballer who plays as a midfielder for the USL Championship club Las Vegas Lights FC. Born in the United States, he represents El Salvador at youth level.

== Early life ==
Romero was born in Henderson, Nevada, United States to a Salvadoran father and an American mother in 2004, and lived there until he joined the U.S. Soccer Development Academy in California in eighth grade. He played in the academies of Minnesota United, Real Salt Lake, and Los Angeles FC during his youth career.

He attended four high schools, and graduated from Bonita High School in La Verne, California.

== Club career ==
=== Las Vegas Lights FC ===
Romero was signed to the Las Vegas Lights FC USL Academy for the 2022 USL Championship season, and subsequently returned for the 2023 season. He made his professional debut as part of the Lights' roster on April 6, 2022. Lights assistant coach Enrique Duran described Romero as "very aggressive and a player with good technical ability. He has this energy".

In the 2024 USL Championship season, Romero has had four appearances as a substitute, and 0 starts.

== International career ==
Romero was called up to the El Salvador under-20 team in 2022 for the 2022 CONCACAF U-20 Championship, where he played in 4 games.
