= Paxten Aaronson =

American soccer player (born 2003)

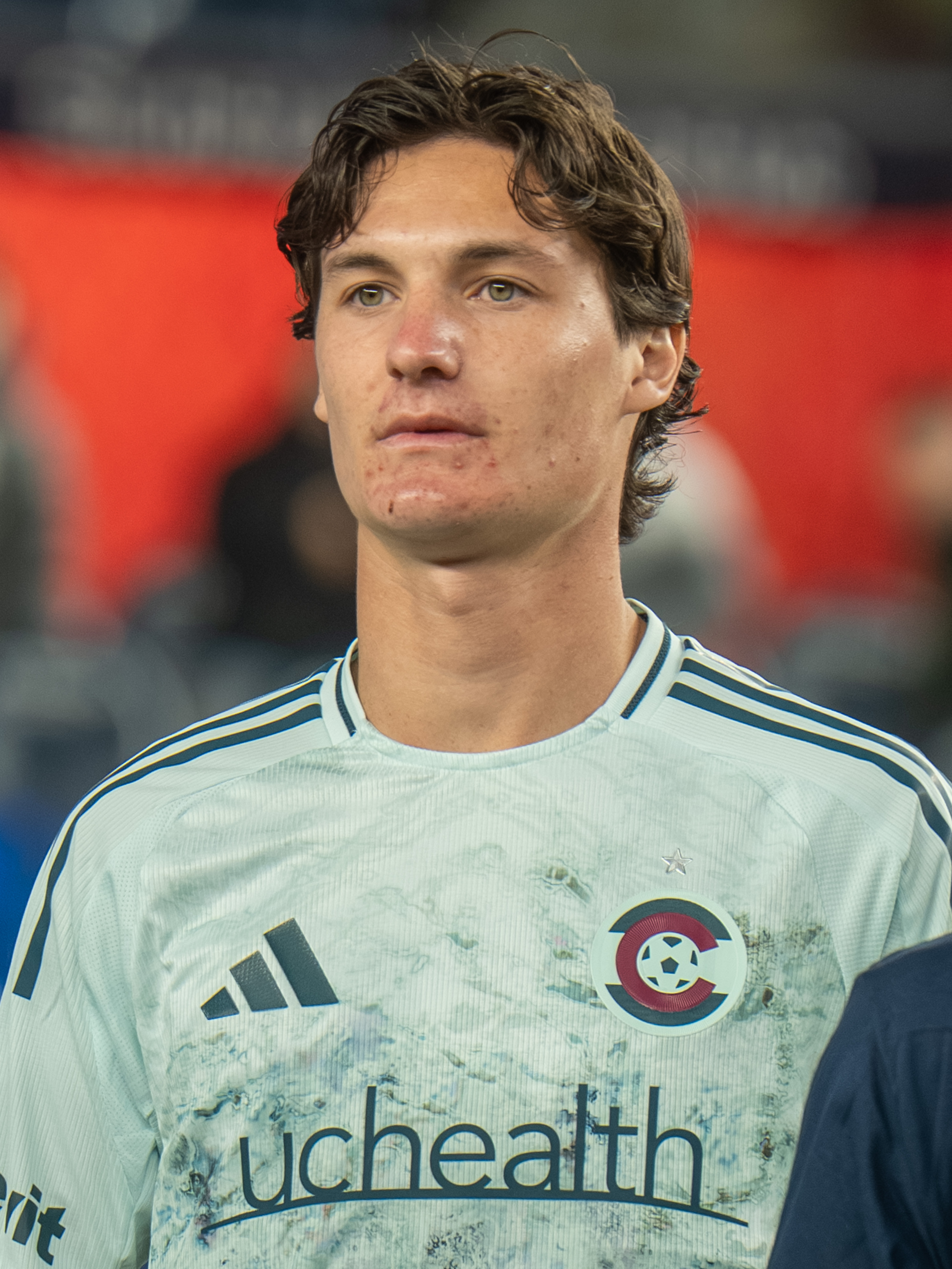
- Aaronson with the Colorado Rapids in 2026

Personal information
- Full name: Paxten Reid Aaronson
- Date of birth: August 26, 2003 (age 23)
- Place of birth: Medford, New Jersey, U.S.
- Height: 5 ft 9 in (1.75 m)
- Position: Midfielder

Team information
- Current team: Colorado Rapids
- Number: 10

Youth career
- 2015–2020: Philadelphia Union

Senior career*
Years	Team	Apps	(Gls)
2020	Philadelphia Union II	14	(1)
2021–2022	Philadelphia Union	37	(4)
2022	→ Philadelphia Union II (loan)	10	(5)
2023–2025	Eintracht Frankfurt	14	(0)
2023	→ Eintracht Frankfurt II (loan)	1	(0)
2024	→ Vitesse (loan)	14	(4)
2024–2025	→ Utrecht (loan)	33	(8)
2024	→ Jong Utrecht (loan)	1	(0)
2025–	Colorado Rapids	40	(9)

International career^{‡}
2021–2023	United States U20	13	(8)
2023–2024	United States U23	9	(2)
2023–	United States	4	(0)
Medal record
Men's football
Representing United States
CONCACAF Gold Cup
Runner-up	2025 Canada–United States
- * Club domestic league appearances and goals as of October 31, 2026 ‡ National team caps and goals as of June 22, 2025

Paxten Reid Aaronson (born August 26, 2003) is an American professional soccer player who plays as a midfielder for Major League Soccer club Colorado Rapids and the United States national team.

== Club career ==
=== Philadelphia Union ===
Aaronson began his career with the Philadelphia Union's YSC Academy and played for the club in the U.S. Soccer Development Academy. After five seasons with the academy, Aaronson was called up to the Philadelphia Union II, the Philadelphia Union reserve team in USL Championship. He made his competitive debut for Union II on July 22, 2020, against New York Red Bulls II, as a 67th-minute substitute for Steve Kingue.

In August 2020, Aaronson signed a homegrown contract with the first team beginning in 2021. In May 2021, he made his first team debut with the Union as a substitute in a 3–0 win over the Portland Timbers. Aaronson earned his first start for the Union in August where he scored the Union's equalizing goal against the New England Revolution. His debut goal earned him the league's Goal of the Week honor.

=== Eintracht Frankfurt ===
On November 17, 2022, it was announced that the Philadelphia Union and Bundesliga club Eintracht Frankfurt had reached a deal for the transfer of Aaronson. The fee of the deal was reported to be in the region of $4 million (plus add-ons), with a sell-on percentage for the Union also included. On March 19, 2023, Aaronson made his Bundesliga debut, being subbed on in the 82nd minute in a 2–0 loss against Union Berlin.

==== Loan to Vitesse ====
On January 31, 2024, the deadline day of the winter transfer window, Aaronson joined Dutch club Vitesse on loan for the rest of the season. Though only playing the last 14 out of the 34 league games for Vitesse, he became the second top goalscorer, with 4 goals, behind Marco van Ginkel with 7 goals. Aaronson was seen as one of the better players of Vitesse in the 2023–2024 season, causing FC Utrecht, among other clubs, to gain interest in him.

==== Loan to Utrecht ====
On June 21, 2024, Eintracht announced that Aaronson had extended his contract with the club until 2028, and would subsequently join Dutch side Utrecht on loan for the entire 2024–25 season.

=== Colorado Rapids ===
On August 21, 2025, Aaronson returned to Major League Soccer, this time with Colorado Rapids on a five-year designated player contract through 2030. Aaronson was acquired for a club-record transfer fee of $7 million. On August 23, Aaronson made his debut for the Rapids when he came on as a 59th-minute substitute in a 3–0 loss to LA Galaxy. On October 18, the final match day of the season, Aaronson scored his first goal for the Rapids in a 2–2 draw with Los Angeles FC. As a result of the draw, the Rapids failed to qualify for the MLS Cup playoffs.

== International career ==
In June 2022, Aaronson was called up to the United States national under-20 team at the 2022 CONCACAF U-20 Championship, where he scored seven goals in seven games, earning him both the Golden Ball and Golden Boot Awards at the tournament.

On January 29, 2023, Aaronson made his senior debut for the United States in a friendly match against Colombia.

On October 8, 2023, Aaronson was called up to the United States under-23 national team ahead of friendlies against Mexico and Japan.

Aaronson was, together with his FC Utrecht teammate Taylor Booth, also called up for the United States soccer team on the 2024 Olympics, appearing four times and scoring twice, in the game against New Zealand, which ended in a 4–1 victory for the United States.

== Personal life ==
Paxten is the younger brother of Leeds United and United States midfielder Brenden Aaronson.

== Career statistics ==
=== Club ===
As of match played October 31, 2026

Appearances and goals by club, season and competition
Club	Season	League			National cup (Note: Includes U.S. Open Cup, DFB-Pokal, KNVB Cup)		Continental		Other		Total	
Club	Season	Division	Apps	Goals	Apps	Goals	Apps	Goals	Apps	Goals	Apps	Goals
Philadelphia Union II	2020	USL Championship	14	1	—		—		—		14	1
Philadelphia Union	2021	MLS	14	3	—		1 (Note: Appearance in CONCACAF Champions League)	0	2 (Note: Appearance(s) in MLS Cup Playoffs)	0	17	3
Philadelphia Union	2022	MLS	23	1	1	0	—		1	0	25	1
Philadelphia Union	Total		37	4	1	0	1	0	3	0	42	4
Philadelphia Union II (loan)	2022	MLS Next Pro	10	5	—		—		—		10	5
Eintracht Frankfurt	2022–23	Bundesliga	7	0	1	0	—		—		8	0
Eintracht Frankfurt	2023–24	Bundesliga	7	0	1	0	6 (Note: Appearances in UEFA Europa Conference League)	0	—		14	0
Eintracht Frankfurt	2025–26	Bundesliga	0	0	1	1	0	0	—		1	1
Eintracht Frankfurt	Total		14	0	3	1	6	0	0	0	23	1
Eintracht Frankfurt II (loan)	2022–23	Hessenliga	1	0	—		—		—		1	0
Vitesse (loan)	2023–24	Eredivisie	14	4	—		—		—		14	4
Utrecht (loan)	2024–25	Eredivisie	33	8	4	1	—		—		37	9
Colorado Rapids	2025	MLS	7	1	—		—		0	0	7	1
Colorado Rapids	2026	MLS	33	8	3	0	0	0	—		36	8
Colorado Rapids	Total		40	9	3	0	0	0	0	0	43	9
Career total			166	31	11	2	7	0	3	0	184	33

=== International ===
As of match played June 22, 2025

Appearances and goals by national team and year
National team	Year	Apps	Goals
United States	2023	1	0
United States	2024	0	0
United States	2025	3	0
Total		4	0

== Honors ==
Philadelphia Union

- MLS Cup runner-up: 2022

Eintracht Frankfurt

- DFB-Pokal runner-up: 2022–23

United States U20

- CONCACAF U-20 Championship: 2022

Individual

- CONCACAF U-20 Championship Best XI: 2022
- CONCACAF U-20 Championship Golden Ball: 2022
- CONCACAF U-20 Championship Golden Boot: 2022
- Eredivisie Talent of the Month: November 2024
- Eredivisie Team of the Month: November 2024
