= Brian Flores (footballer) =

Puerto Rican footballer (born 2003)

Personal information
- Full name: Brian Gabriel Flores
- Date of birth: August 25, 2003 (age 23)
- Place of birth: Connecticut, United States
- Positions: Defensive midfielder; centre-back

Team information
- Current team: New York City FC II
- Number: 45

Youth career
- New York City FC

Senior career*
Years	Team	Apps	(Gls)
2022–	New York City FC II	13	(0)

International career
2022–	Puerto Rico	1	(0)
- * Club domestic league appearances and goals as of September 20, 2022

Brian Gabriel Flores (born August 25, 2003) is a footballer who plays as a defensive midfielder for New York City FC II in the MLS Next Pro. Born in the mainland United States, he represents the Puerto Rico national team. He can also play as a centre-back.

== Club career ==
Trained in the youth ranks of New York City FC, Flores signed a contract with New York City FC II of MLS Next Pro in March 2023.

== International career ==
Born in the United States, of Puerto Rican descent and with an Ecuadorian father, Flores chose to represent Puerto Rico. He debuted for the Puerto Rico national team on June 12, 2022, against the British Virgin Islands.
