= Cofradía, Cortés =

Town in Honduras

Coordinates: 15°25′01″N 88°09′37″W

Cofradía is a town in northwestern Honduras, in the Naco Valley, with a population of 45,430 (2023 calculation) making it the second largest city in San Pedro Sula Municipality. The town is located 24 km southwest from the city of San Pedro Sula.

== Physical and political geography ==
The limits of Cofradia are:

- To the north, the Sierra del Merendón
- To the south, the river Chamelecon
- To the east, the river Manchaguala and the community Brisas del Valle
- To the west, the community of Naco and the Honduran Third Infantry Battalion

Cofradia stands at 15°24' north latitude and 88°09' west longitude and is approximately 160 metres above sea level. The urbanised area of Cofradia covers 48 hectares. It is generally hilly, with only a few flat areas. The land sits in the watersheds of the Manchaguala, Chamelecon and San Bartolo rivers.

Mining of ferrous ores has resulted in erosion, forming cracks and gullies.

=== Forest ===
In the low-lying areas there is a dry mountainous and forest with thick underbrush; towards El Merendón, there is an abundant mountainous forest of pine and oak. Also, as one ascends to the higher parts of the Sierra del Merendón cloudy mountain forest and tropical rain forest.

=== Climate ===
- Based on data from 1966 to 1985 September is the rainiest month and March the driest.
- The windward side experiences heavy, semi-seasonal rainfall.
- The anticyclone of the Bermudas produces especially hot weather in August.
- There are an average of 160 to 180 rainy days each year, with an average annual rainfall of 53 to 57 inches (1300 to 1400 mm).

== Infrastructure ==
- A boulevard of approximately 800 meters and paved streets.
- A public park named after Donaldo Sabillon Vásquez.
- Approximately seven churches

Public services:

- Potable water
- Mail service by Honduran postal system
- Interurban transport: Empresas de Transporte inter-urbano Cofradia (ETICA) and Empresa San Isidro
- A public health centre called "CLIPECC"
- Two police precincts
- A firehouse
- A social centre
- A municipal market
- Phone service from Hondutel
- An old people's dining hall

Privately owned services

- "Hermanas Agustinas" dispensary
- "Adonay" private clinic
- "San Antonio" private clinic
- Dr. Seren private clinic
- Four Internet Centers and 5 Internet cafés
- Three hardware and goods stores
- Two telegraph offices
- Children's nursery

=== Educational institutions ===
Institutes:

- Instituto Técnico "José Castro López" (public), that offers the Basic Cycle option with Home Workshops, Metal and Wooden Structures, Electricity, as well as the Commerce Education, Business Administration and Quality Control majors.
- El I.D.E.S. (private) has the Common Cycle on General Culture option with the majors of Business Administration, CCLL and Marketing Technician, CCLL and Computing technician.
- El ITECC (private) offers the Common cycle with Computing and the majors of Business Administration and CCLL and Computing Technician.
- Instituto Luz del Milenio (private)

Public schools

- Escuela Dr. Miguel Paz Barahona
- Escuela Laura Vda. de Alcocer
- Escuela Margarita Suazo de Matamoros
- Escuela Donaldo Sabillon Vasquez

Private schools:

- Cofradia's Bilingual School – CBS was founded in 1997 and is dedicated to offering a bilingual education (Spanish, English) to children from all social levels in the community. No application is ever denied on the basis of inability to pay tuition. CBS recruits volunteer teachers from all over the developed world every year to bring a global reality to all the students and operates in partnership with the Hope for Tomorrow foundation (501)(c)(3) in Massachusetts to ensure that the poorer students continue to receive the same opportunities as their more affluent classmates. The school also has a partnership with Crescent School in Canada, in which students from Crescent help on projects and teaching around the school. 143 out of the 210 students enrolled in 2006 are receiving scholarship assistance.
- San Jeronimo Bilingual School – a nonprofit bilingual school operated collaboratively by a local association of Hondurans and the US based non-profit "BECA" (www.becaschools.org). BECA's mission is to promote cultural exchange and affordable bilingual education. The organisation's volunteer driven bilingual school model creates an environment in which deserving Central American students learn from dedicated volunteer teachers, and those volunteers learn from the community in which they are immersed. SJBS is proud to be a true example of sustainable international development work in practice.
- Escuela Luz Milenium

Kindergartens:

- Lila Luz de Maradiaga (public)

Academies:

- Academia de Corte y Confección (private academy for clothes design)

== Demography ==
Counting together the urban centre of Cofradia and what are now 25 colonias (suburbs or outlying neighbourhoods), Cofradia has grown by a factor of more than 35 in the last century:

- 1906: 412 inhabitants
- 1983: 3,249 inhabitants
- 1993: 8,213 inhabitants
- 2001: 15,000 inhabitants, with approximately 2,473 dwellings.

=== Colonias ===
- Col. 9 de Mayo
- Col. 24 de Abril
- Col. Arévalo
- Bo. El Centro
- Ojo de Agua No. 2
- San Bartolo
- Col. Matamoros
- Col. Ojo de Agua No. 1
- Col. Vida Nueva
- Col. Roberto Micheletti
- Col. Los Ángeles
- Col. Gracias A Dios
- Col. Rivera Fajardo
- Col. Victoria
- Col. Salazar
- Altos de Cofradía
- Francisco Méndez
- Col. Brisas de Occidente
- Col. Nueva Cofradia
- Col. San Manuel
- Col. Milenium
- Col. Miramontes
- Col. El Paraíso
- Col. 4 de Febrero
- Bo. Guadalupe
- Col. Brisas del Valle No. 2
- Senderos de Occidente
- Suban
- Col. San Juan Bosco
- Bo. El Campo
- Col. Tito Consani
- 10 de Enero
- Col. El Calanar
- Residencial Cofradía
- Residencial Las Flores
- La Gran Familia

== Commerce ==
As of 2004, Cofradia is considered part of San Pedro Sula municipality, since San Pedro Sula's development can only grow southwestward; in fact, 5 maquilas have already opened in that sector. Development may be limited by the fact that the area is not properly legalised, and has lands to which more than one owner can produce a title; as a result it is hard to legally buy and sell property.

The commercial zone is the centre of Cofradia, where most retail buying and selling occurs.

== Events ==
General Esperanzano Gregorio Ferrera surrendered at Cofradia 26 June 1931 after a six-years-long attempted uprising.

Telegraph service in Cofradia began 7 November 1905; the first telegraphist was Don Juan Magnar. Other early telegraphists were Cesar Mejia, who arrived in 1908 from an unknown location and Don Rodolfo Castillo who arrived on 7 March 1911 from Santa Bárbara.

The dam was built in 1936–37 under the supervision of engineer Gonzalo R. Luque. The mayor of San Pedro Sula at this time was Don José Castro López, who presided over the inauguration of the dam 24 December 1937.

== Education ==
The first school was founded in 1900; its first teacher was Don Filadelfo López Morales.

A boys' school was founded in 1900, by teacher Donaldo Sabillon Vásquez.

The girls' school was founded between in 1905 and 1912; its first teacher was Elvia Julia Morales.

Another boys' school was founded in 1930 under the direction of Leandro Rodríguez.

The Miguel Paz Barahona girls school was founded 24 December 1937 at the same time as the inauguration of a municipal water system. The mayor of San Pedro Sula at this time, Don José Castro López, appointed Doña Laura Vda. de Alcocer the director, and in 1920 Don Donaldo was promoted to the position, with a monthly salary of Lps. 90.

At that time, sixth grade was offered only in the more advanced villages, with children in others only going to the fifth grade. The age of matriculation ranged between 7 and 18 years. The teachers were very strict disciplinarians: if a student failed to show up for school, a teacher's assistant would seek the student out and bring him or her back to school, to be punished there by the teacher; and punished again by his or her parents upon arriving back home. The students received 8 hours of lessons daily. Teaching materials for students included a notebook made of sewn office paper, ink made with blue aniline. Pencils were of made candle wax, the satchels were made of cloth or nylon.
