= Israel Boatwright =

American-Dominican footballer

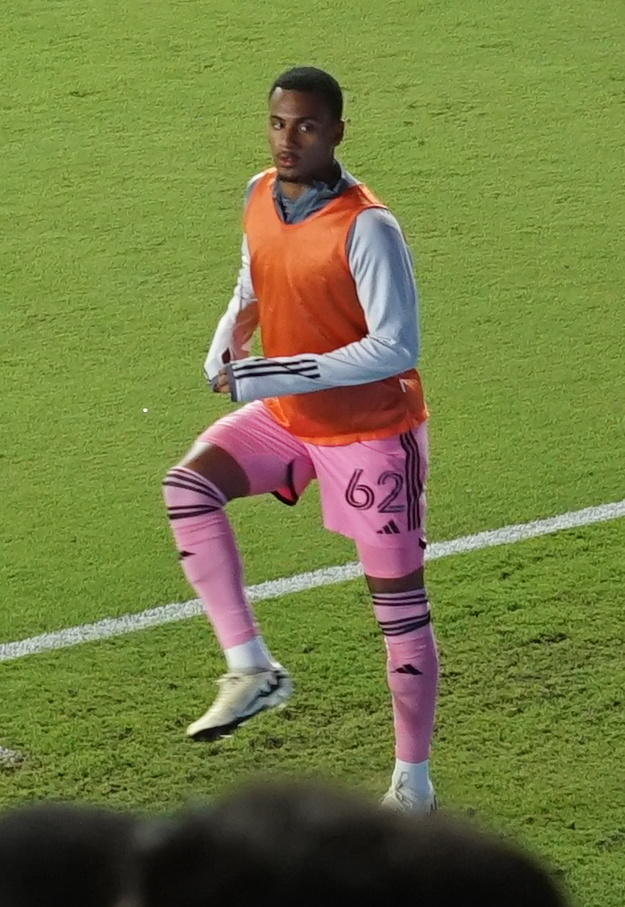
- Boatwright with Inter Miami in 2024

Personal information
- Full name: Israel Ramón Boatwright de la Cruz
- Date of birth: 2 June 2005 (age 21)
- Place of birth: Grand Rapids, Michigan, U.S.
- Height: 1.80 m (5 ft 11 in)
- Position: Defender

Team information
- Current team: Inter Miami
- Number: 62

Youth career
- 2019–2021: Inter Miami

Senior career*
Years	Team	Apps	(Gls)
2021–2023	Inter Miami II	21	(1)
2023	→ Inter Miami (loan)	2	(0)
2024–	Inter Miami	0	(0)
2024–	→ Inter Miami II (loan)	6	(1)

International career
2022–2024	Dominican Republic U20	5	(1)
2023–	Dominican Republic U23	4	(0)
- * Club domestic league appearances and goals as of 31 December 2025

Israel Ramón Boatwright de la Cruz (born 2 June 2005) is a professional footballer who plays as a defender for Major League Soccer club Inter Miami. Born in the United States, he represents the Dominican Republic at youth level.

== Club career ==
He is a homegrown product of the Inter Miami academy, having joined the youth set-up in 2019. He made his debut for Inter Miami CF II in 2022. They signed Boatwright to a professional MLS NEXT Pro contract in May 2023. He made his Major League Soccer debut for Inter Miami in July 2023. He made two appearances during the 2023 season on a short-term loan from Inter Miami II.

In January 2024, he signed a three-year contract with Inter Miami, with options for two further years.

== International career ==
Boatwright was born in the United States to an American father and a Dominican mother. He scored on his debut for the Dominican Republic U20 side on June 26, 2022, in a group stage match of the 2022 Concacaf U-20 Championship, helping his country reach the final of the tournament. He was subsequently selected for the Dominican Republic's team for the 2023 FIFA U-20 World Cup.

== Honours ==
Inter Miami

- MLS Cup: 2025
- Eastern Conference (MLS): 2025
