= Tarick Ximines =

Jamaican footballer (born 2004)

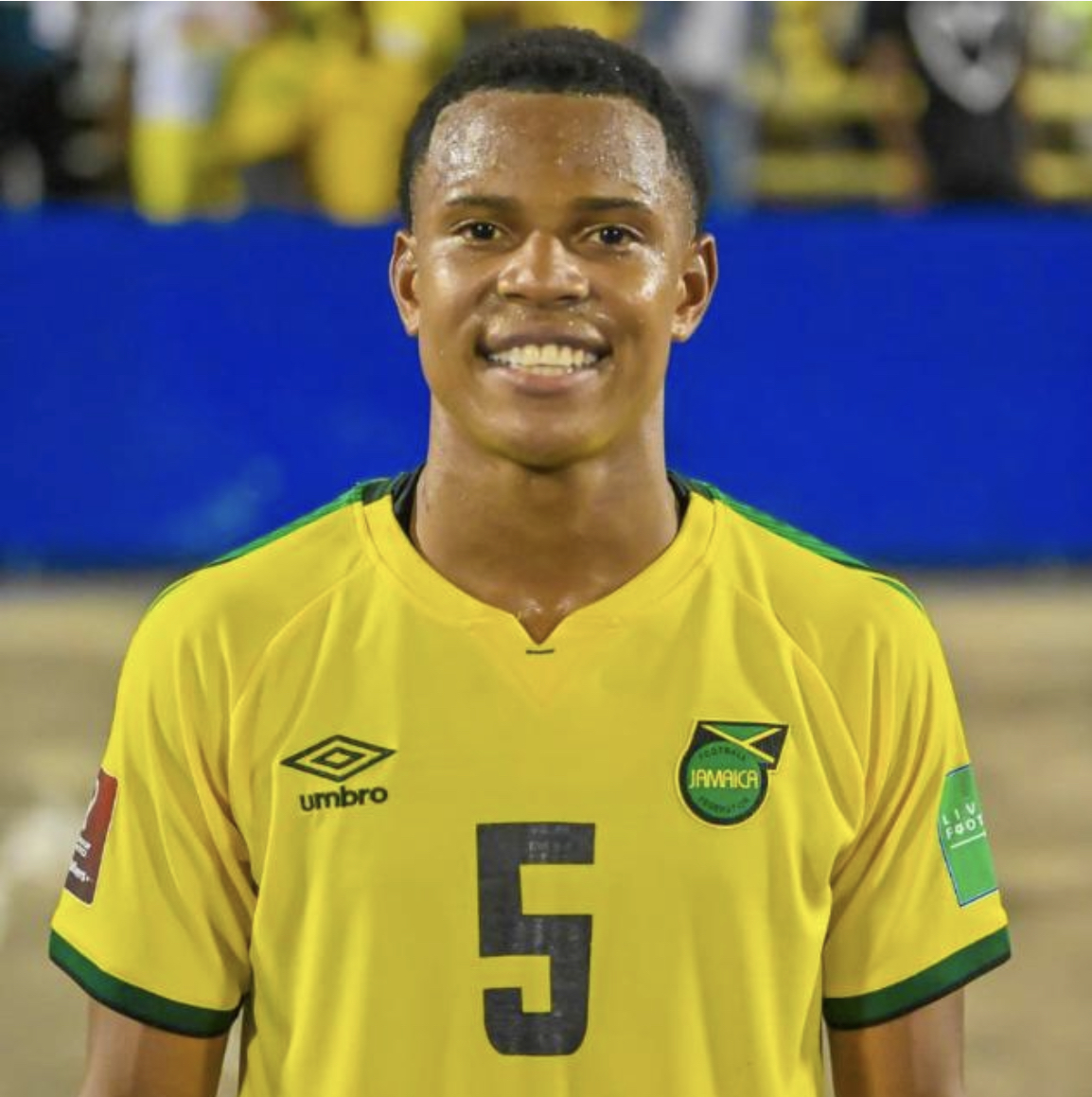
- Ximines with Jamaica in 2022

Personal information
- Full name: Tarick Tarrio Ximines
- Date of birth: 7 October 2004 (age 22)
- Place of birth: Kingston, Jamaica
- Height: 1.83 m (6 ft 0 in)
- Positions: Right-back; midfielder

Team information
- Current team: Portmore United F.C.

Senior career*
Years	Team	Apps	(Gls)
2021–2022	Harbour View F.C.	16	(1)
2022	Mount Pleasant	5	(1)
2023–2024	Cercle Brugge U23	30	(5)
2023–2024	Cercle Brugge	1	(0)
2024-	Portmore United F.C.	64	(11)

International career^{‡}
2022	Jamaica U20	4	(1)
2022–	Jamaica	2	(0)
- * Club domestic league appearances and goals as of 22:53, 09 January 2024 (UTC) ‡ National team caps and goals as of 22:53, 26 June 2022 (UTC)

Tarick Tarrio Ximines (born 7 October 2004) is a Jamaican professional footballer who plays as a right-back or midfielder for Portmore United F.C. and the Jamaica national team.

== Club career ==
In June 2021 Tarick made his pro debut for Harbour View F.C. in the Jamaica Premier League at the age of sixteen. He went on to appear in 8 games in the season that was shortened due to the COVID-19 pandemic. The following season he appeared in 8 games for Harbour View F.C. and another 5 games for Mount Pleasant, the latter to which he transferred in early 2022. He also played in the Manning Cup Schoolboy Football competition that same year representing Jamaica College, the school he played 3 Manning Cup seasons for, winning the cup in 2022. The now 17 year old managed to score a goal for both Harbour View F.C. and Mount Pleasant during the 2022 Jamaica Premier League season, thus earning his first national senior team call up under coach Paul Hall.

In January 2023, Ximines signed a deal with Belgian club Cercle Brugge, in the Belgian First Division.

He made his debut for Cercle Brugge U23 on 28 January 2023 against KM Torhout. He went on to score his first goal the following week on 4 February in the 3–1 win over RFC Wetteren. He made his senior debut for Cercle Brugge on 1 April 2023 at home in a 2–0 victory against KV Kortrijk. He made a total of 30 appearances for the Cercle Brugge U23 team before returning to Jamaica in 2024 to sign with 7 time Jamaica Premier League champions Portmore United F.C. He started 35 games during the 2024-2025 Jamaica Premier League season contributing 3 goals and 7 assists from the right back position. He went on to win the Jamaica Premier League in the 2025–2026 season with Portmore United F.C. scoring 8 goals and contributing 10 assists while earning Jamaica Premier League player of the season.

== International career ==
Ximines made his Jamaica international debut as a 17 year old versus Canada on March 27, 2022, in a World Cup Qualifier at BMO Field in Toronto, Ontario. He became the youngest ever Jamaican player to feature for the senior team in a World Cup Qualifier at the age of 17 years and 5 months.

== Career statistics ==
=== Club ===
As of 25 April 2022.

Club	Season	League			Cup		Other		Total	
Club	Season	Division	Apps	Goals	Apps	Goals	Apps	Goals	Apps	Goals
Harbour View F.C.	2021	National Premier League	8	0	0	0	0	0	8	0
Harbour View F.C.	2022	National Premier League	8	1	0	0	0	0	8	1
Mount Pleasant Football Academy	2022	National Premier League	5	1	0	0	0	0	5	1
Cercle Brugge U23	2022-23	Belgian Division 2	11	2	0	0	0	0	11	2
Cercle Brugge U23	2023-24	Belgian Division 2	19	3	0	0	0	0	19	3
Cercle Brugge	2022-23	Jupiler Pro League	1	0	0	0	0	0	1	0
Portmore United F.C.	2024-25	Jamaica Premier League	35	3	0	0	0	0	35	3
Portmore United F.C.	2025-26	Jamaica Premier League	29	8	0	0	0	0	29	8
Total			116	18	0	0	0	0	116	18
