= Shawn Johnson (footballer) =

Costa Rican association football player

Personal information
- Date of birth: 28 February 2003 (age 23)
- Position: Defender

Team information
- Current team: Municipal Liberia (on loan from Herediano)

Senior career*
Years	Team	Apps	(Gls)
2021–2023	Guanacasteca	64	(0)
2023–	Herediano	23	(2)
2025–2026	→ Municipal Liberia (loan)	28	(0)

International career^{‡}
2022	Costa Rica U20	2	(0)
2026–	Costa Rica	1	(0)
- * Club domestic league appearances and goals as of 23:25 (UTC) 10 June 2026 ‡ National team caps and goals as of 10 June 2026

Shawn Johnson (born 28 February 2003) is a Costa Rican professional footballer who plays as a defender for Municipal Liberia, on loan from Herediano, and the Costa Rica national team.

== Club career ==
From Escazú, and a full-back, Johnson played for Guanacasteca from 2021, and played 20 games with the team in the 2023 Apertura tournament prior to signing with Club Sport Herediano in December 2023. He scored his first professional goal for Herediano against Municipal Grecia in February 2024.

In 2025 and 2026, Johnson played for Municipal Liberia, on loan from Herediano, for whom he reminded under contract until June 2026.

== International career ==
Johnson played for Costa Rica U20 at the 2022 Concacaf Under-20 Championship. He was called up to the senior Costa Rica national football team in March 2026. He made his senior debut in a friendly match against England in Orlando, Florida on 10 June 2026.

== Career statistics ==
=== International ===
As of match played 10 June 2026

Appearances and goals by national team and year
National team	Year	Apps	Goals
Costa Rica	2026	1	0
Total		1	0
