= Ronald Arévalo =

American footballer (born 2003)

Personal information
- Date of birth: 18 May 2003 (age 23)
- Place of birth: North Bergen, New Jersey, United States
- Position: Winger

Senior career*
Years	Team	Apps	(Gls)
2021	Cedar Stars Rush	7	(1)
2021	HB Køge	1	(0)
2022	OTP	2	(0)
2022–2024	New York City FC II	13	(0)

International career
2022–	El Salvador U20	4	(1)
2021–	El Salvador	1	(0)
- * Club domestic league appearances and goals as of 08:44, 31 May 2023 (UTC)

Ronald Arévalo (born 18 May 2003) is a professional footballer who plays as a winger. Born in the United States, he is an El Salvador international.

== Career ==
Arévalo started his career with American fourth tier side Cedar Stars Rush. In 2021, he signed for HB Køge in the Danish second tier. Before the 2022 season, Arévalo signed for Finnish third-tier club OTP.

In 2022, he signed for NYCFC II in the American third tier.
