= Harvest Christian Academy (Honduras) =

- Tegucigalpa; Honduras

Information
- School type: Private Protestant
- Religious affiliation: Harvest Christian Center Chicago
- Founded: 2005
- Founder: Ray Llarena
- Status: Closed
- Average class size: 20
- Language: Spanish, English
- Campus type: Urban
- Sports: Basketball, volleyball, badminton, tennis, chess

Harvest Christian Academy (commonly known as Harvest Christian Academy Honduras and abbreviated as HCA) is a bilingual interdenominational Protestant school located in Tegucigalpa, Honduras. It offers preschool, elementary and secondary education.
