= Romario Torres =

Cuban footballer (born 2005)

Personal information
- Full name: Romario Torres Gutiérrez
- Date of birth: 9 February 2005 (age 21)
- Place of birth: Bahía Honda, Cuba
- Height: 1.82 m (6 ft 0 in)
- Position: Right winger

Team information
- Current team: Leça

Senior career*
Years	Team	Apps	(Gls)
2022	FC Artemisa	24	(6)
2023–2024	Nacional B		
2024–2026	ADR Jicaral		
2026–	Leça	0	(0)

International career^{‡}
2022–2025	Cuba U20	11	(1)
2023–	Cuba	13	(1)
- * Club domestic league appearances and goals ‡ National team caps and goals as of 4 March 2026

Romario Torres Gutiérrez (born 9 February 2005) is a Cuban footballer who plays as a defender for Liga 3 club Leça. Torres mainly operates as a winger while playing for the Cuba national team.

== Early life ==
Torres started playing football at age seven.

== Club career ==
Torres made his debut for FC Artemisa in the Campeonato Nacional de Fútbol de Cuba at the age of 16. He scored six goals in 24 league games and helped the team win the 2022 league title. Torres signed with Uruguayan side Nacional in 2023.

Torres was described as "one of the best prospects in Cuba".

== Career statistics ==
=== International ===
Scores and results list Cuba's goal tally first.

List of international goals scored by Romario Torres
No.	Date	Venue	Opponent	Score	Result	Competition
1.	12 November 2025	Estadio Cibao FC, Santiago de los Caballeros, Dominican Republic	Saint Lucia	1–0	3–0	2025–26 CONCACAF Series

== Personal life ==
Torres was named after Brazil international Romário.

== Honours ==
=== Artemisa ===
- Liga Nacional: 2022

=== Individual ===
- Best Player of the Liga Nacional de Cuba Clausura: 2022
