= 2015 CONCACAF U-20 Championship squads =

Below are the rosters for the 2015 CONCACAF U-20 Championship held in Jamaica from 9–24 January 2015.

== Aruba ==
Head Coach: (Netherlands) Arent Bekhof

No.	Pos.	Player	Date of birth (age)	Club
1	GK	Jean-Marc Antersijn	5 January 1996 (aged 19)	(Royal Dutch Football Association) Haaglandia
2	DF	Niels Ridderstap	10 January 1997 (aged 17)	(Royal Dutch Football Association) FC Groningen
3	DF	Jefferson Vegas	30 January 1995 (aged 19)	(Royal Dutch Football Association) Vitesse Delft
4	DF	Nickenson Paul	24 August 1997 (aged 17)	(Aruba Football Federation) SV Dakota
5	DF	Joel Geerman	12 June 1997 (aged 17)	(Aruba Football Federation) SV Estrella
6	MF	Johnatan Ruiz	1 June 1995 (aged 19)	(Aruba Football Federation) SV Britannia
7	FW	Youri Wernet	7 November 1996 (aged 18)	(Royal Dutch Football Association) SV Marum
8	MF	Gregorio van der Biezen	4 March 1996 (aged 18)	(Royal Dutch Football Association) USV Hercules
9	FW	Duncan Homoet	16 January 1997 (aged 17)	(Aruba Football Federation) SV Estrella
10	MF	Walter Bennett	18 March 1997 (aged 17)	(Royal Dutch Football Association) Elinkwijk
11	FW	Ricky Marte Hodge	5 June 1996 (aged 18)	(Aruba Football Federation) SV Riverplate
12	GK	Brandon Malmaceda	29 July 1997 (aged 17)	(Aruba Football Federation) SV RCA
13	DF	Carl Geerman	23 March 1997 (aged 17)	(Aruba Football Federation) SV Britannia
14	MF	Marcel Kock	6 April 1996 (aged 18)	(Aruba Football Federation) SV Britannia
15	FW	Aidan Martha	5 February 1996 (aged 18)	(Royal Dutch Football Association) VOAB
16	MF	Franklin Ortiz Cabarcas	31 December 1996 (aged 18)	(Aruba Football Federation) SV Dakota
17	FW	Andrew Valois-Smith	20 February 1997 (aged 17)	(Aruba Football Federation) Nacional
18	MF	Kevin Tromp	3 January 1997 (aged 18)	(Royal Dutch Football Association) HVV Hollandia
19	DF	David Dubero	15 November 1996 (aged 18)	(Aruba Football Federation) SV Estrella
20	FW	Jeanpierre van der Linden	7 January 1998 (aged 17)	(Aruba Football Federation) SV RCA

== Canada ==
Head Coach: (England) Rob Gale

No.	Pos.	Player	Date of birth (age)	Club
1	GK	Nolan Wirth	24 January 1995 (aged 19)	(United States Soccer Federation) Oregon State University
2	DF	Chris Serban	15 November 1995 (aged 19)	(Canadian Soccer Association) University of British Columbia
3	DF	Sam Adekugbe	16 January 1995 (aged 19)	(Canadian Soccer Association) Vancouver Whitecaps FC
4	DF	Alex Comsia	1 August 1996 (aged 18)	(French Football Federation) RC Strasbourg
5	DF	Luca Gasparotto	9 March 1995 (aged 19)	(Scottish Football Association) Airdrieonians
6	MF	Manny Aparicio	17 September 1995 (aged 19)	(Canadian Soccer Association) Toronto FC
7	MF	Louis Béland-Goyette	15 September 1995 (aged 19)	(Canadian Soccer Association) Montreal Impact
8	MF	Jérémy Gagnon-Laparé	9 March 1995 (aged 19)	(Canadian Soccer Association) Montreal Impact
9	FW	Calum Ferguson	12 February 1995 (aged 19)	(Scottish Football Association) Inverness Caledonian Thistle
10	MF	Marco Bustos	22 April 1996 (aged 18)	(Canadian Soccer Association) Vancouver Whitecaps FC
11	DF	Jordan Haynes	17 March 1996 (aged 18)	(Canadian Soccer Association) Vancouver Whitecaps FC
13	FW	Hanson Boakai	28 October 1996 (aged 18)	(Canadian Soccer Association) FC Edmonton
14	MF	Chris Nanco	15 February 1996 (aged 18)	(United States Soccer Federation) Syracuse University
15	DF	Brandon John	5 January 1995 (aged 20)	(German Football Association) Erzgebirge Aue
16	FW	Jordan Hamilton	17 March 1996 (aged 18)	(Canadian Soccer Association) Toronto FC
17	FW	Cyle Larin	17 April 1995 (aged 19)	(United States Soccer Federation) Orlando City
18	GK	Marco Carducci	24 September 1996 (aged 18)	(Canadian Soccer Association) Vancouver Whitecaps FC
19	MF	Kianz Froese	16 April 1996 (aged 18)	(Canadian Soccer Association) Vancouver Whitecaps FC
20	MF	Michael Petrasso	9 July 1995 (aged 19)	(The Football Association) Queens Park Rangers
23	DF	Jackson Farmer	31 May 1995 (aged 19)	(Canadian Soccer Association) Vancouver Whitecaps FC

== Cuba ==
Head Coach: (Cuba) Willian Bennett

No.	Pos.	Player	Date of birth (age)	Club
1	GK	Elier Pozo	28 January 1995 (aged 19)	(Football Association of Cuba) FC Pinar del Rio
2	MF	Roberney Caballero	2 November 1995 (aged 19)	(Football Association of Cuba) FC Villa Clara
3	DF	Jonathan Moliner	1 February 1996 (aged 18)	(Football Association of Cuba) FC Cienfuegos
4	DF	Sandro Cutiño	3 March 1995 (aged 19)	(Football Association of Cuba) FC Las Tunas
5	DF	Brian Rosales	7 March 1995 (aged 19)	(Football Association of Cuba) FC Matanzas
6	DF	Gilbert Iglesias	21 June 1995 (aged 19)	(Football Association of Cuba) FC Villa Clara
7	MF	Eddy Luis Sanamé	19 January 1995 (aged 19)	(Football Association of Cuba) FC La Habana
8	DF	Yendri Torres	5 October 1995 (aged 19)	(Football Association of Cuba) FC Cienfuegos
9	FW	Félix Pérez	12 March 1995 (aged 19)	(Football Association of Cuba) FC La Habana
10	MF	Roberto Peraza	12 April 1995 (aged 19)	(Football Association of Cuba) FC La Habana
11	FW	Frank López	25 February 1995 (aged 19)	(Football Association of Cuba) FC Cienfuegos
12	GK	Delvis Lumpuy	8 February 1995 (aged 19)	(Football Association of Cuba) FC Villa Clara
13	DF	Issan Lartiga	5 March 1995 (aged 19)	(Football Association of Cuba) FC Artemisa
14	MF	Norgerman Rodríguez	10 April 1996 (aged 18)	(Football Association of Cuba) FC Villa Clara
15	DF	Daniel Alarcó	8 April 1995 (aged 19)	(Football Association of Cuba) FC La Habana
16	MF	George Guibert	7 March 1995 (aged 19)	(Football Association of Cuba) FC Guantánamo
17	FW	Yoan Godinez	16 January 1997 (aged 17)	(Football Association of Cuba) FC La Habana
18	MF	Alejandro Portal	21 October 1995 (aged 19)	(Football Association of Cuba) FC Mayabeque
19	MF	David Urgellés	24 April 1995 (aged 19)	(Football Association of Cuba) FC Guantánamo
20	FW	Osmany Capote	11 March 1995 (aged 19)	(Football Association of Cuba) FC Villa Clara

== El Salvador ==
Head Coach: (El Salvador) Mauricio Alfaro

No.	Pos.	Player	Date of birth (age)	Club
1	GK	Carlos Cañas	26 March 1995 (aged 19)	(United States Soccer Federation) Longwood University
2	DF	Nelson Moreno	23 November 1996 (aged 18)	(Salvadoran Football Federation) Club Social Ciclón del Golfo
3	DF	Roberto Domínguez	9 May 1997 (aged 17)	(Salvadoran Football Federation) Juventud Independiente
4	DF	Bryan Tamacas	21 February 1995 (aged 19)	(Salvadoran Football Federation) C.D. FAS
5	DF	Edwin Cuellar	17 June 1995 (aged 19)	(Salvadoran Football Federation) Santa Tecla F.C.
6	MF	Narciso Orellana	28 January 1995 (aged 19)	(Salvadoran Football Federation) A.D. Isidro Metapán
7	MF	Alvaro Lizama	24 May 1995 (aged 19)	(Salvadoran Football Federation) C.D. Aguila
8	MF	Alvaro Guardado	11 September 1995 (aged 19)	(Salvadoran Football Federation) Juventud Independiente
9	FW	Bryan Pérez	4 March 1996 (aged 18)	(Salvadoran Football Federation) C.D. Luis Angel Firpo
10	MF	Josue Hernandez	2 June 1996 (aged 18)	(Salvadoran Football Federation) C.D. Atletico Marte
11	MF	Jose Villavicencio	24 January 1995 (aged 19)	(Salvadoran Football Federation) C.D. FAS
12	DF	Cesar Flores	17 March 1995 (aged 19)	(Salvadoran Football Federation) C.D. Luis Angel Firpo
13	FW	Jonathan Miranda	15 February 1995 (aged 19)	(Salvadoran Football Federation) Audaz
14	MF	Andres Flores Jaco	20 January 1995 (aged 19)	(Salvadoran Football Federation) Alianza F.C.
15	FW	William Canales	18 February 1995 (aged 19)	(Salvadoran Football Federation) C.D. Atletico Marte
16	MF	Eduardo Merino	21 December 1995 (aged 19)	(Salvadoran Football Federation) C.D. Atletico Marte
17	DF	Juan Barahona	12 February 1995 (aged 19)	(Salvadoran Football Federation) Santa Tecla F.C.
18	GK	Nicolas Pacheco	7 April 1995 (aged 19)	(Salvadoran Football Federation) C.D. FAS
19	MF	Julio Amaya	29 March 1995 (aged 19)	(Salvadoran Football Federation) Marte Soyapango
20	MF	Romilio Hernandez	20 March 1995 (aged 19)	(United States Soccer Federation) University of Louisville

== Guatemala ==
Head Coach: (Guatemala) Carlos Ruíz

No.	Pos.	Player	Date of birth (age)	Club
1	GK	Nicholas Hagen	2 August 1996 (aged 18)	(National Football Federation of Guatemala) Municipal
2	DF	Kevin Grijalva	9 January 1995 (aged 20)	(National Football Federation of Guatemala) Comunicaciones
3	DF	Allen Yanes	4 July 1997 (aged 17)	(National Football Federation of Guatemala) Achik
4	DF	Nicolas Samayoa	2 August 1995 (aged 19)	(United States Soccer Federation) Florida Gulf Coast University
5	MF	Luis De Leon	14 November 1995 (aged 19)	(National Football Federation of Guatemala) Comunicaciones
6	DF	Cristian Jiménez	26 April 1995 (aged 19)	(National Football Federation of Guatemala) Municipal
7	FW	Paolo Ortíz	6 November 1995 (aged 19)	(National Football Federation of Guatemala) Comunicaciones
8	FW	Kevin Bordon	31 January 1995 (aged 19)	(National Football Federation of Guatemala) Comunicaciones
9	FW	Mauro Portillo	14 July 1995 (aged 19)	(National Football Federation of Guatemala) Municipal
10	MF	Diego Alvarez	4 February 1995 (aged 19)	(National Football Federation of Guatemala) Comunicaciones
11	FW	Mario Hernández	1 December 1996 (aged 18)	(National Football Federation of Guatemala) Municipal
12	GK	Julio Ochoa	4 September 1995 (aged 19)	(National Football Federation of Guatemala) Malacateco
13	MF	Stheven Robles	10 November 1995 (aged 19)	(National Football Federation of Guatemala) Comunicaciones
14	MF	Andy Ruiz	30 May 1996 (aged 18)	(United States Soccer Federation) FC Dallas
15	DF	Carlos Estrada	12 September 1997 (aged 17)	(National Football Federation of Guatemala) Malacateco
16	MF	Julio Ortiz	1 January 1995 (aged 20)	(National Football Federation of Guatemala) Comunicaciones
17	FW	Pablo Aguilar	21 February 1995 (aged 19)	(United States Soccer Federation) University of Virginia
18	MF	Benedicto Aldana	2 May 1996 (aged 18)	(National Football Federation of Guatemala) Heredia
19	DF	José Morales	3 December 1996 (aged 18)	(National Football Federation of Guatemala) Municipal
20	DF	Mauricio Maltes	29 December 1996 (aged 18)	(National Football Federation of Guatemala) Suchitepequez

== Haiti ==
Head Coach: (France) Jérôme Velfert

No.	Pos.	Player	Date of birth (age)	Club
1	GK	Ramos Pointe Jour	6 April 1995 (aged 19)	(Haitian Football Federation) América des Cayes
2	DF	Stephane Lambese	10 November 1995 (aged 19)	(French Football Federation) Paris Saint-Germain
4	MF	Benderlin Beaubrun	29 January 1996 (aged 18)	(Haitian Football Federation) Aigle Noir AC
6	DF	Fernander Demas	31 December 1996 (aged 18)	(Haitian Football Federation) Tempête FC
7	DF	Francy Pierre	7 December 1997 (aged 17)	(Haitian Football Federation) Baltimore SC
8	MF	Venel Saint-Fort	20 December 1996 (aged 18)	(Haitian Football Federation) Don Bosco FC
9	FW	Jonel Désiré	12 February 1997 (aged 17)	(Haitian Football Federation) AS Mirebalais
10	MF	Woodensky Cherefant	16 January 1995 (aged 19)	(Haitian Football Federation) Tempête FC
11	MF	Bryan Alceus	1 February 1996 (aged 18)	(French Football Federation) FC Girondins de Bordeaux
12	GK	Guitho Charles	17 May 1995 (aged 19)	(Haitian Football Federation) Petit-Goâve FC
13	MF	Bebeto Muraille	6 September 1996 (aged 18)	(Haitian Football Federation) Petit-Goâve FC
14	MF	Alessandro Campoy	7 June 1997 (aged 17)	(United States Soccer Federation) Weston FC
15	DF	Jean Becker Jean Baptiste	18 January 1995 (aged 19)	(Haitian Football Federation) Tempête FC
16	DF	Zachary Herivaux	1 February 1996 (aged 18)	(United States Soccer Federation) New England Revolution Academy
17	FW	Nerlin Saint-Vil	16 February 1996 (aged 18)	(Haitian Football Federation) Aigle Noir AC
18	DF	Marckendel Paul	21 December 1995 (aged 19)	(Haitian Football Federation) Baltimore SC
19	FW	Peterson Joseph, Jr.	20 January 1996 (aged 18)	(Haitian Football Federation) Aigle Noir AC
21	FW	Derrick Etienne	25 November 1996 (aged 18)	(United States Soccer Federation) New York Red Bulls Academy
25	DF	Wilmond Oracius	18 March 1997 (aged 17)	(Haitian Football Federation) Baltimore SC
26	DF	Geordany Valerius	21 August 1995 (aged 19)	(Haitian Football Federation) América des Cayes

== Honduras ==
Head Coach: (Honduras) Jorge Jiménez

No.	Pos.	Player	Date of birth (age)	Club
1	GK	Cristian Hernández	22 September 1996 (aged 18)	(National Autonomous Federation of Football of Honduras) Valle
2	DF	Kevin Álvarez	3 August 1996 (aged 18)	(National Autonomous Federation of Football of Honduras) Olimpia
3	DF	Jhonatan Paz	18 June 1995 (aged 19)	(National Autonomous Federation of Football of Honduras) Real Sociedad
4	DF	Luís Santos	3 May 1996 (aged 18)	(National Autonomous Federation of Football of Honduras) Olimpia
5	DF	Dábirson Castillo	25 September 1996 (aged 18)	(National Autonomous Federation of Football of Honduras) Platense
6	DF	Carlos Moncada	4 September 1995 (aged 19)	(National Autonomous Federation of Football of Honduras) Real España
7	MF	Michaell Chirinos	17 June 1995 (aged 19)	(National Autonomous Federation of Football of Honduras) Olimpia
8	MF	Rolin Álvarez	14 June 1995 (aged 19)	(National Autonomous Federation of Football of Honduras) Parrillas One
9	FW	Bryan Róchez	1 January 1995 (aged 20)	(United States Soccer Federation) Orlando City SC
10	MF	José Escalante	25 May 1995 (aged 19)	(National Autonomous Federation of Football of Honduras) Olimpia
11	DF	Elder Torres	14 April 1995 (aged 19)	(National Autonomous Federation of Football of Honduras) Vida
12	GK	Roberto López	23 April 1995 (aged 19)	(National Autonomous Federation of Football of Honduras) Real España
13	MF	Jhow Benavídez	26 December 1995 (aged 19)	(National Autonomous Federation of Football of Honduras) Real España
14	MF	John Suazo	10 July 1995 (aged 19)	(National Autonomous Federation of Football of Honduras) Marathón
15	DF	Maylor Nuñez	7 May 1996 (aged 18)	(National Autonomous Federation of Football of Honduras) Motagua
16	DF	Devron García	17 February 1996 (aged 18)	(National Autonomous Federation of Football of Honduras) Victoria
17	FW	Alberth Elis	2 December 1996 (aged 18)	(National Autonomous Federation of Football of Honduras) Olimpia
18	MF	Kevin López	3 February 1996 (aged 18)	(National Autonomous Federation of Football of Honduras) Motagua
19	FW	Júnior Lacayo	19 August 1995 (aged 19)	(Mexican Football Federation) Santos Laguna
20	MF	Deybi Flores	16 June 1996 (aged 18)	(Canadian Soccer Association) Vancouver Whitecaps

== Jamaica ==
Head Coach: (Jamaica) Theodore Whitmore

No.	Pos.	Player	Date of birth (age)	Club
1	GK	Nicholas Nelson	4 September 1996 (aged 18)	(United States Soccer Federation) Georgia United
2	FW	Khallil Stewart Milton	19 January 1996 (aged 18)	(United States Soccer Federation) UNC Charlotte
3	DF	Javaun Waugh	16 November 1995 (aged 19)	(Jamaica Football Federation) Portmore United
4	DF	Rennico Clarke	26 August 1995 (aged 19)	(Jamaica Football Federation) Harbour View
5	DF	Allando Brown	27 September 1996 (aged 18)	(Jamaica Football Federation) Jamaica College
6	MF	Martin Davis	11 October 1996 (aged 18)	(Canadian Soccer Association) TFC Academy
7	DF	Malcom Stewart	14 April 1996 (aged 18)	(United States Soccer Federation) UNC Charlotte
8	FW	Daniel Roberts	30 May 1995 (aged 19)	(Jamaica Football Federation) Rivoli United
9	FW	Michael Seaton	1 May 1996 (aged 18)	(United States Soccer Federation) D.C. United
10	FW	Junior Flemmings	16 January 1996 (aged 18)	(Jamaica Football Federation) Tivoli Gardens
11	MF	I'Ishmale Currie	21 March 1996 (aged 18)	(Jamaica Football Federation) Portmore United
12	DF	Roberto Johnson	23 September 1995 (aged 19)	(Jamaica Football Federation) Portmore United
13	GK	Dane-Andrew Chambers	16 June 1995 (aged 19)	(Jamaica Football Federation) Harbour View
14	MF	John Luca Levee	21 February 1997 (aged 17)	(United States Soccer Federation) GPS Massachusetts
15	FW	Donja Ojay Smith	13 September 1995 (aged 19)	(Jamaica Football Federation) St. Elizabeth Tech
16	FW	Shamar Nicholson	16 March 1997 (aged 17)	(Jamaica Football Federation) Boys Town
17	DF	Shaquille Dyer	10 August 1995 (aged 19)	(Jamaica Football Federation) Arnett Gardens
18	DF	Joel Cunningham	21 August 1996 (aged 18)	(Jamaica Football Federation) Wolmers Boys
19	FW	Cardel Benbow	3 June 1995 (aged 19)	(Jamaica Football Federation) Waterhouse
20	FW	Isamnia St Noel Cohen	21 September 1995 (aged 19)	(Jamaica Football Federation) Manchester High School

== Mexico ==
Head Coach: (Mexico) Sergio Almaguer

No.	Pos.	Player	Date of birth (age)	Club
1	GK	Jesse Gonzalez	25 May 1995 (aged 19)	(United States Soccer Federation) Dallas
2	DF	Kevin Gutiérrez	1 March 1995 (aged 19)	(Mexican Football Federation) Querétaro
3	DF	Óscar Bernal	28 September 1995 (aged 19)	(Mexican Football Federation) Santos Laguna
4	DF	Rodrigo González	12 April 1995 (aged 19)	(Mexican Football Federation) América
5	MF	Sergio Flores	12 February 1995 (aged 19)	(Mexican Football Federation) Guadalajara
6	DF	Víctor Guzmán	3 February 1995 (aged 19)	(Mexican Football Federation) Guadalajara
7	MF	Érick Gutiérrez	15 June 1995 (aged 19)	(Mexican Football Federation) Pachuca
8	MF	Hirving Lozano	30 July 1995 (aged 19)	(Mexican Football Federation) Pachuca
9	FW	Diego Pineda	8 April 1995 (aged 19)	(Mexican Football Federation) América
10	FW	José Alberto García	22 February 1995 (aged 19)	(Mexican Football Federation) Tijuana
11	MF	David Ramírez	14 December 1995 (aged 19)	(Mexican Football Federation) Guadalajara
12	GK	Édson Reséndez	12 January 1996 (aged 18)	(Mexican Football Federation) CF Monterrey
13	DF	Pablo Jáquez	29 September 1995 (aged 19)	(Mexican Football Federation) UNAM
14	MF	Érick Aguirre	23 February 1997 (aged 17)	(Mexican Football Federation) Monarcas Morelia
15	DF	José Robles	16 July 1996 (aged 18)	(Mexican Football Federation) UNAM
16	DF	Aldo Benítez	30 January 1996 (aged 18)	(Mexican Football Federation) Toluca
17	MF	Luis Márquez	10 February 1995 (aged 19)	(Mexican Football Federation) Guadalajara
18	FW	Alejandro Díaz	27 January 1996 (aged 18)	(Mexican Football Federation) América
19	FW	Guillermo Martínez	15 March 1995 (aged 19)	(Mexican Football Federation) Pachuca
20	MF	Mauro Laínez	9 May 1996 (aged 18)	(Mexican Football Federation) Pachuca

== Panama ==
Head Coach: (Argentina) Leonardo Pipino

No.	Pos.	Player	Date of birth (age)	Club
1	GK	Pedro Campos	28 October 1995 (aged 19)	(Panamanian Football Federation) Sporting San Miguelito
2	DF	Chin Hormechea	12 May 1996 (aged 18)	(Panamanian Football Federation) Arabe Unido
3	MF	Kevin Galván	10 March 1996 (aged 18)	(Panamanian Football Federation) Sporting San Miguelito
4	DF	Michael Amir Murillo	11 February 1996 (aged 18)	(Panamanian Football Federation) San Francisco FC
5	MF	Francisco Narbon	11 February 1995 (aged 19)	(United States Soccer Federation) James Madison University
6	DF	Fidel Escobar	9 January 1995 (aged 20)	(Panamanian Football Federation) Sporting San Miguelito
7	MF	Julian Velarde	18 September 1996 (aged 18)	(Panamanian Football Federation) Chorrillo F.C.
8	MF	Luís Pereira	27 March 1996 (aged 18)	(Panamanian Football Federation) Arabe Unido
9	FW	Ismael Díaz	12 May 1997 (aged 17)	(Panamanian Football Federation) Tauro FC
10	MF	Jhamal Rodríguez	28 January 1995 (aged 19)	(Panamanian Football Federation) Chorrillo F.C.
11	FW	Ervin Zorrilla	14 May 1996 (aged 18)	(Panamanian Football Federation) Tauro FC
12	GK	Jaime de Gracia	11 May 1996 (aged 18)	(Panamanian Football Federation) Tauro FC
13	DF	Jomar Díaz	29 October 1996 (aged 18)	(Panamanian Football Federation) Tauro FC
14	DF	Jesús Araya	3 January 1996 (aged 19)	(Panamanian Football Federation) Tauro FC
15	DF	Fabián Salcedo	24 November 1995 (aged 19)	(Panamanian Football Federation) Sporting San Miguelito
16	MF	Edson Samms	27 March 1995 (aged 19)	(Panamanian Football Federation) San Francisco FC
17	MF	Justin Simons	19 September 1997 (aged 17)	(Panamanian Football Federation) San Francisco FC
18	FW	Carlos Small	13 March 1995 (aged 19)	(Panamanian Football Federation) Sporting San Miguelito
19	MF	Richard Rodríguez	25 December 1995 (aged 19)	(Panamanian Football Federation) San Francisco FC
20	FW	Ruben Barrow	28 April 1995 (aged 19)	(Panamanian Football Federation) Tauro FC

== Trinidad and Tobago ==
Head Coach: (Trinidad and Tobago) Derek King

No.	Pos.	Player	Date of birth (age)	Club
1	GK	Johan Welch	4 January 1997 (aged 18)	(United States Soccer Federation) Houston Dynamo
2	DF	Shannon Gomez	5 October 1996 (aged 18)	(Trinidad and Tobago Football Association) W Connection
3	DF	Martieon Watson	13 October 1996 (aged 18)	(Trinidad and Tobago Football Association) W Connection
4	DF	Jesús Pérez	11 September 1995 (aged 19)	(Trinidad and Tobago Football Association) North East Stars
5	DF	Leland Archer	8 January 1996 (aged 19)	(United States Soccer Federation) College of Charleston
6	MF	Duane Muckette	1 July 1995 (aged 19)	(United States Soccer Federation) University of South Florida
7	MF	Akeem Garcia	11 September 1996 (aged 18)	(Trinidad and Tobago Football Association) W Connection
8	MF	Neveal Hackshaw	21 September 1995 (aged 19)	(Trinidad and Tobago Football Association) North East Stars
9	FW	Kadeem Corbin	4 March 1996 (aged 18)	(Trinidad and Tobago Football Association) St. Ann's Rangers F.C.
10	MF	Jabari Mitchell	1 May 1997 (aged 17)	(Trinidad and Tobago Football Association) W Connection
11	MF	Levi García	20 November 1997 (aged 17)	(Trinidad and Tobago Football Association) Central FC
12	MF	Kishun Seecharan	6 June 1996 (aged 18)	(Trinidad and Tobago Football Association) Defence Force
13	DF	Brandon Creed	10 December 1996 (aged 18)	(United States Soccer Federation) Temple University
14	MF	Matthew Woo Ling	15 September 1996 (aged 18)	(Trinidad and Tobago Football Association) W Connection
15	MF	Aikim Andrews	20 June 1996 (aged 18)	(Trinidad and Tobago Football Association) San Juan Jabloteh
16	FW	Ricardo John	10 April 1995 (aged 19)	(United States Soccer Federation) Virginia Tech
17	MF	Akeem Humphrey	25 November 1995 (aged 19)	(Trinidad and Tobago Football Association) Club Sando FC
18	MF	Kevon Goddard	20 January 1996 (aged 18)	(Trinidad and Tobago Football Association) Central FC
19	DF	Maurice Ford	6 September 1996 (aged 18)	(Trinidad and Tobago Football Association) W Connection
21	GK	Javon Sample	13 April 1995 (aged 19)	(Trinidad and Tobago Football Association) Central FC

== United States ==
Head Coach: (United States) Tab Ramos

No.	Pos.	Player	Date of birth (age)	Club
1	GK	Zack Steffen	2 April 1995 (aged 19)	(German Football Association) Freiburg
2	DF	Shaquell Moore	2 November 1996 (aged 18)	Unattached
3	DF	John Requejo	23 May 1996 (aged 18)	(Mexican Football Federation) Tijuana
4	DF	Cameron Carter-Vickers	31 December 1997 (aged 17)	(The Football Association) Tottenham Hotspur
5	DF	Matt Miazga	19 July 1995 (aged 19)	(United States Soccer Federation) New York Red Bulls
6	MF	Kellyn Acosta	24 July 1995 (aged 19)	(United States Soccer Federation) FC Dallas
7	FW	Paul Arriola	5 February 1995 (aged 19)	(Mexican Football Federation) Tijuana
8	MF	Emerson Hyndman	9 April 1996 (aged 18)	(The Football Association) Fulham
9	FW	Romain Gall	31 January 1995 (aged 19)	(United States Soccer Federation) Columbus Crew
10	MF	Junior Flores	26 March 1996 (aged 18)	(German Football Association) Borussia Dortmund
11	FW	Tommy Thompson	15 August 1995 (aged 19)	(United States Soccer Federation) San Jose Earthquakes
12	GK	Ethan Horvath	9 June 1995 (aged 19)	(Norwegian Football Federation) Molde
13	DF	Tyler Turner	4 March 1996 (aged 18)	(United States Soccer Federation) Orlando City
14	DF	Conor Donovan	8 January 1996 (aged 19)	(United States Soccer Federation) Orlando City
15	MF	Fernando Arce Jr.	27 November 1996 (aged 18)	(Mexican Football Federation) Tijuana
16	MF	Russell Canouse	11 June 1995 (aged 19)	(German Football Association) TSG 1899 Hoffenheim
17	FW	Amando Moreno	10 September 1995 (aged 19)	(Mexican Football Federation) Tijuana
18	MF	Lynden Gooch	24 December 1995 (aged 19)	(The Football Association) Sunderland
19	FW	Bradford Jamieson IV	18 October 1996 (aged 18)	(United States Soccer Federation) LA Galaxy
20	FW	Ben Spencer	28 March 1995 (aged 19)	(Norwegian Football Federation) Molde
