= 2015 CONCACAF U-20 Championship =

Campeonato Sub-20 de CONCACAF (in Spanish)

Tournament details
- Host country: Jamaica
- Dates: 9–24 January
- Teams: 12 (from 1 confederation)
- Venues: 2 (in 2 host cities)

Final positions
- Champions: Mexico (13th title)
- Runners-up: Panama

Tournament statistics
- Matches played: 33
- Goals scored: 102 (3.09 per match)
- Top scorer(s): (Mexico) Hirving Lozano (United States) Romain Gall (5 goals each)
- Best player: (Panama) Luís Pereira
- Best goalkeeper: (Panama) Jaime de Gracia
- Fair play award: United States

The 2015 CONCACAF Under-20 Championship was an association football tournament that took place from 9 to 24 January 2015 in Jamaica. It determined the four CONCACAF teams that would participate at the 2015 FIFA U-20 World Cup in New Zealand.

== Qualification ==
Team	Qualification	Appearances	Previous best performances	FIFA U-20 World Cup Participations
North American zone
Canada	Automatic	21st	Champions (1986, 1996)	8
Mexico (TH)	Automatic	24th	Champions (1962, 1970, **1973**, 1974, 1976, 1978, 1980, 1984, 1990, 1992, 2011, **2013**)	13
United States	Automatic	22nd	Runners-up (**1980**, 1982, 1986, 1992, 2009, 2013)	13
Central American zone qualified through the Central America qualifying
Panama	First place	9th	Fourth place (2011)	4
El Salvador	Second place	15th	Champions (1964)	1
Honduras	Third place	17th	Champions (1982, **1994**)	5
Guatemala	Fourth place	18th	Runners-up (1962, 1973)	1
Caribbean zone qualified through the Caribbean qualifying
Jamaica	Host	19th	Third Place (1970)	1
Trinidad and Tobago	Group A winner	18th	Runners-up (1990)	2
Cuba	Group A runner-up	12th	Runners-up (**1970**, 1974)	1
Haiti	Group B winner	7th	Second Round (1978)	0
Aruba	Group B runner-up	1st		0

Note: no titles or runners-up between 1998 and 2007.
Bold indicates that the corresponding team was hosting the event.

== Venues ==
In March 2014, Enrique Sanz invited nations to bid for the hosting rights of the tournament. The deadline for submissions was 14 April 2014. On 23 July, it was announced that Jamaica would be the host nation.

2015 CONCACAF U-20 Championship is located in Jamaica	Kingston	Montego Bay
2015 CONCACAF U-20 Championship is located in Jamaica	Independence Park	Montego Bay Sports Complex
2015 CONCACAF U-20 Championship is located in Jamaica	Capacity: 35,000	Capacity: 7,000

== New format ==
Previously there were four groups of three teams during the group stage of the competition, each team played a minimum of two games and the previous format had a total of 20 matches. For this tournament, there was two groups of six teams, each team played a minimum of five games and the competition had a total of 33 matches. CONCACAF stated that the new format would aid development and competition.

The knockout phase, which included eight matches, comprised four quarter finals, two semi-finals, a third-place playoff and a final games was replaced with two playoff games and a final.

== Draw ==
The draw took place on 30 October at the Hilton Rose Hall Resort in Montego Bay, Jamaica.

On 28 October 2014, CONCACAF announced the procedure of the draw. The 12 teams were divided into three differing pots:

Pot	Teams
Pot 1 (Caribbean)	Jamaica; Aruba; Cuba; Haiti; Trinidad and Tobago
Pot 2 (Central America)	El Salvador; Guatemala; Honduras; Panama
Pot 3 (North America)	Canada; Mexico; United States
Pot A (Seeding for Group A)	Six balls with a group positions, 1-6
Pot B (Seeding for Group B)	Six balls with a group positions, 1-6

Prior to the draw, hosts Jamaica were assigned to position A1. Teams were grouped according to the order in which they were drawn, the odd numbered drawn teams were assigned a position from Pot A (Group A) and the even numbered draws were assigned a position from Pot B (Group B).

== Squads ==
Only players born on or after 1 January 1995 were eligible to play in the tournament. Each participating national association were required to provide a provisional list of 20-30 players to CONCACAF before 10 December 2014, and a final 20-man selection was required by 30 December 2014.

== Group stage ==
All times local: UTC−05:00.

=== Group A ===
Pos	Team	Pld	W	D	L	GF	GA	GD	Pts	Qualification
1	Panama	5	5	0	0	9	0	+9	15	Final and 2015 FIFA U-20 World Cup
2	United States	5	3	1	1	12	2	+10	10	Playoff stage
3	Guatemala	5	3	1	1	6	2	+4	10	Playoff stage
4	Trinidad and Tobago	5	1	1	3	7	7	0	4	
5	Jamaica (H)	5	0	2	3	2	7	−5	2	
6	Aruba	5	0	1	4	1	19	−18	1	

Source: CONCACAF
Rules for classification: Tiebreakers
(H) Hosts
9 January 2015
15:00

Aruba	0–4	Panama
	Report	Díaz 19', 51'; Zorrilla 30'; Samms 36'

Independence Park, Kingston
Referee: David Gantar (Canada)
9 January 2015
17:30

United States	1–1	Guatemala
Carter-Vickers 59'	Report	Ruiz 90'

Independence Park, Kingston
Referee: Henry Bejarano (Costa Rica)
9 January 2015
20:00

Jamaica	2–2	Trinidad and Tobago
Smith 68'; Flemmings 90+4'	Report	Andrews 7'; Corbin 15'

Independence Park, Kingston
Referee: Fernando Guerrero (Mexico)

11 January 2015
15:00

Trinidad and Tobago	5–1	Aruba
Mitchell 3', 78' (pen.); Andrews 16'; Corbin 29' (pen.); Muckette 58'	Report	Homoet 90+2'

Independence Park, Kingston
Referee: Armando Castro (Honduras)
11 January 2015
17:30

Panama	1–0	United States
Small 78'	Report

Independence Park, Kingston
Referee: Yadel Martínez (Cuba)
11 January 2015
20:00

Jamaica	0–1	Guatemala
	Report	Robles 27'

Independence Park, Kingston
Referee: Marlon Mejía (El Salvador)

14 January 2015
15:00

Guatemala	2–0	Trinidad and Tobago
Watson 25' (o.g.); Portillo 88'	Report

Independence Park, Kingston
Referee: David Gantar (Canada)
14 January 2015
17:30

Aruba	0–8	United States
	Report	Gall 16', 23' (pen.), 32'; Spencer 18'; Thompson 26'; Hyndman 30'; Jamieson 48'; Moreno 84'

Independence Park, Kingston
Referee: Fernando Guerrero (Mexico)
14 January 2015
20:00

Jamaica	0–2	Panama
	Report	Samms 56'; Díaz 86'

Independence Park, Kingston
Referee: Henry Bejarano (Costa Rica)

18 January 2015
15:00

Panama	1–0	Trinidad and Tobago
Murillo 78'	Report

Montego Bay Sports Complex, Montego Bay
Referee: Armando Castro (Honduras)
18 January 2015
17:30

Guatemala	2–0	Aruba
Estrada 42'; Bordon 60'	Report

Montego Bay Sports Complex, Montego Bay
Referee: Yadel Martínez (Cuba)
18 January 2015
20:00

Jamaica	0–2	United States
	Report	Gall 33' (pen.), 70' (pen.)

Montego Bay Sports Complex, Montego Bay
Referee: Marlon Mejía (El Salvador)

21 January 2015
15:00

Panama	1–0	Guatemala
Díaz 65'	Report

Montego Bay Sports Complex, Montego Bay
Referee: Hugo Cruz (Costa Rica)
21 January 2015
17:30

United States	1–0	Trinidad and Tobago
Jamieson 78'	Report

Montego Bay Sports Complex, Montego Bay
Referee: John Pitti (Panama)
21 January 2015
20:00

Jamaica	0–0	Aruba
	Report

Montego Bay Sports Complex, Montego Bay
Referee: Kimbell Ward (Saint Kitts and Nevis)

=== Group B ===
Pos	Team	Pld	W	D	L	GF	GA	GD	Pts	Qualification
1	Mexico	5	4	1	0	18	3	+15	13	Final and 2015 FIFA U-20 World Cup
2	Honduras	5	3	1	1	11	9	+2	10	Playoff stage
3	El Salvador	5	2	2	1	9	8	+1	8	Playoff stage
4	Cuba	5	1	1	3	5	17	−12	4	
5	Canada	5	1	0	4	8	11	−3	3	
6	Haiti	5	0	3	2	7	10	−3	3	

Source: CONCACAF
Rules for classification: Tiebreakers
10 January 2015
15:00

Mexico	9–1	Cuba
Díaz 1', 20'; Martínez 6', 65' (pen.); Lozano 37', 40'; Ramírez 42', 47'; Márquez 70'	Report	Sanamé 3'

Montego Bay Sports Complex, Montego Bay
Referee: John Pitti (Panama)
10 January 2015
17:30

Honduras	2–2	El Salvador
Róchez 6' (pen.); Elis 28'	Report	Barahona 84'; Villavicencio 90' (pen.)

Montego Bay Sports Complex, Montego Bay
Referee: Hugo Cruz (Costa Rica)
10 January 2015
20:00

Haiti	1–3	Canada
Désiré 29'	Report	Hamilton 11', 18'; Petrasso 70' (pen.)

Montego Bay Sports Complex, Montego Bay
Referee: Leo Clarke (Saint Lucia)

12 January 2015
15:00

Canada	0–2	Mexico
	Report	Lozano 30'; Pineda 90+2'

Montego Bay Sports Complex, Montego Bay
Referee: Oscar Reyna (Guatemala)
12 January 2015
17:30

Cuba	0–3	Honduras
	Report	Elis 60'; Suazo 65'; Benavidez 83'

Montego Bay Sports Complex, Montego Bay
Referee: Armando Villarreal (United States)
12 January 2015
20:00

El Salvador	1–1	Haiti
Villavicencio 27'	Report	Désiré 89' (pen.)

Montego Bay Sports Complex, Montego Bay
Referee: Sandy Vásquez (Dominican Republic)

15 January 2015
15:00

El Salvador	3–2	Canada
Pérez 43'; Villavicencio 77'; Hernández 90+4'	Report	Boakai 47'; Froese 79'

Montego Bay Sports Complex, Montego Bay
Referee: Valdin Legister (Jamaica)
15 January 2015
17:30

Mexico	3–0	Honduras
Díaz 15' (pen.); Lozano 31'; Guzmán 89'	Report

Montego Bay Sports Complex, Montego Bay
Referee: John Pitti (Panama)
15 January 2015
20:00

Haiti	2–2	Cuba
Fernander 57'; Cherenfant 79'	Report	Caballero 28'; Torres 90+2'

Montego Bay Sports Complex, Montego Bay
Referee: Hugo Cruz (Costa Rica)

19 January 2015
15:00

Cuba	2–1	Canada
López 5', 40'	Report	Farmer 53'

Montego Bay Sports Complex, Montego Bay
Referee: Sandy Vásquez (Dominican Republic)
19 January 2015
17:30

El Salvador	1–3	Mexico
Moreno 89'	Report	Ramírez 62'; Díaz 65'; Lozano 68' (pen.)

Montego Bay Sports Complex, Montego Bay
Referee: Armando Villarreal (United States)
19 January 2015
20:00

Haiti	2–3	Honduras
Désiré 40', 69'	Report	Elis 5'; Chirinos 38'; Róchez 72'

Montego Bay Sports Complex, Montego Bay
Referee: Oscar Reyna (Guatemala)

22 January 2015
15:00

Cuba	0–2	El Salvador
	Report	Barahona 57', 87'

Montego Bay Sports Complex, Montego Bay
Referee: David Gantar (Canada)
22 January 2015
17:30

Honduras	3–2	Canada
Róchez 23', 83'; Castillo 68'	Report	Bustos 19'; Hamilton 41'

Montego Bay Sports Complex, Montego Bay
Referee: Fernando Guerrero (Mexico)
22 January 2015
20:00

Haiti	1–1	Mexico
Saint-Vil 53'	Report	Laínez 39'

Montego Bay Sports Complex, Montego Bay
Referee: Sherwin Moore (Guyana)

== Final stage ==
In the final stage, if a match was level at the end of normal playing time, extra time was played (two periods of fifteen minutes each) and followed, if necessary, by a penalty shoot-out to determine the winner.

=== Playoff stage ===
The second-and third-place teams from each group were re-seeded by group stage results, with the best team facing the fourth-best team, and the second-best team facing the third-best team.

Seed	Grp	Team	Pld	W	D	L	GF	GA	GD	Pts
1	A	United States	5	3	1	1	12	2	+10	10
2	A	Guatemala	5	3	1	1	6	2	+4	10
3	B	Honduras	5	3	1	1	11	9	+2	10
4	B	El Salvador	5	2	2	1	9	8	+1	8

Source: CONCACAF
Rules for classification: Tiebreakers
24 January 2015
14:00

Guatemala	1–2	Honduras
Álvarez 74'	Report	Chirinos 39'; Elis 56'

Montego Bay Sports Complex, Montego Bay
Referee: Henry Bejarano (Costa Rica)

24 January 2015
17:00

United States	2–0	El Salvador
Spencer 37'; Arriola 68'	Report

Montego Bay Sports Complex, Montego Bay
Referee: Fernando Guerrero (Mexico)

Honduras and the United States qualified to the 2015 FIFA U-20 World Cup.

=== Final ===
24 January 2015
20:00

Panama	1–1 (a.e.t.)	Mexico
Escobar 73' (pen.)	Report	Martínez 50'
Penalties
Díaz (penalty scored); Escobar (penalty scored); Samms (penalty missed); Small (penalty missed)	2–4	(penalty scored) Martínez; (penalty scored) Díaz; (penalty scored) Aguirre; (penalty scored) Robles

Montego Bay Sports Complex, Montego Bay
Referee: Yadel Martínez (Cuba)

Both Mexico and Panama qualified to the 2015 FIFA U-20 World Cup.

== Awards ==
Golden Ball

- (Panama) Luis Pereira

Golden Boot

The award was shared.

- (United States) Romain Gall
- (Mexico) Hirving Lozano

Golden Glove

- (Panama) Jaime de Gracia

Fair Play Award

- United States

Best XI

- Goalkeeper: (Panama) Jaime de Gracia
- Right Defender: (United States) Shaquell Moore
- Central Defender: (Mexico) Rodrigo González
- Central Defender: (Panama) Chin Hormechea
- Left Defender: (Panama) Kevin Galván
- Right Midfielder: (Mexico) Hirving Lozano
- Central Midfielder: (Mexico) Erick Gutiérrez
- Central Midfielder: (Panama) Luís Pereira
- Left Midfielder: (United States) Romain Gall
- Forward: (Mexico) Alejandro Díaz
- Forward: (Panama) Ismael Díaz

== Top goal scorers ==
Players with three or more goals:

5 goals

- (Mexico) Hirving Lozano
- (United States) Romain Gall

4 goals

- (Haiti) Jonel Désiré
- (Honduras) Alberth Elis
- (Honduras) Bryan Róchez
- (Mexico) Alejandro Díaz
- (Panama) Ismael Díaz

3 goals

- (Canada) Jordan Hamilton
- (El Salvador) Juan Barahona
- (El Salvador) José Villavicencio
- (Mexico) Guillermo Martínez
- (Mexico) José Ramírez

== Final ranking ==
Pos	Team	Pld	W	D	L	GF	GA	GD	Pts	Final result
1	Mexico	6	4	2	0	19	4	+15	14	Champions
2	Panama	6	5	1	0	10	1	+9	16	Runners-up
3	United States	6	4	1	1	14	2	+12	13	Won in Qualifying Round
4	Honduras	6	4	1	1	13	10	+3	13	Won in Qualifying Round
5	Guatemala	6	3	1	2	7	4	+3	10	Lost in Qualifying Round
6	El Salvador	6	2	2	2	9	10	−1	8	Lost in Qualifying Round
7	Trinidad and Tobago	5	1	1	3	7	7	0	4	Eliminated in Group stage
8	Cuba	5	1	1	3	5	17	−12	4	Eliminated in Group stage
9	Canada	5	1	0	4	8	11	−3	3	Eliminated in Group stage
10	Haiti	5	0	3	2	7	10	−3	3	Eliminated in Group stage
11	Jamaica (H)	5	0	2	3	2	7	−5	2	Eliminated in Group stage
12	Aruba	5	0	1	4	1	19	−18	1	Eliminated in Group stage

Source: CONCACAF.com
(H) Hosts

Note: Per statistical convention in football, matches decided in extra time are counted as wins and losses, while matches decided by penalty shoot-out are counted as draws.
