= Guardianes 2020 Liga MX championship stage =

Guardianes 2020 Liga MX final phase

The Torneo Guardianes 2020 (stylized as Guard1anes) Liga MX final phase was played between 21 November 2020 to 13 December 2020. A total of 12 teams competed in the final phase to decide the champions of the Guardianes 2020 Liga MX season. For the first time since the Clausura 2008 season, an additional qualifying round, the reclassification or repechaje, was employed, expanding the number of playoff spots from eight to 12.

Due to the COVID-19 pandemic in Mexico, all matches of the final phase, except for the first leg of the quarter-final between Guadalajara and América, were played behind closed doors.

Both finalists qualified to the 2022 CONCACAF Champions League.

== Qualified teams ==
The following teams qualified for the championship stage.

In the following tables, the number of appearances, last appearance, and previous best result count only those in the short tournament era starting from Invierno 1996 (not counting those in the long tournament era from 1943–44 to 1995–96).

Qualified directly to quarter-finals (4 teams)
Seed	Team	Points (GD)	Date of qualification	Appearance	Last appearance	Previous best	Ref.
1	León	40	2 October 2020	12th	Apertura 2019	Champions (2 times)	
2	UNAM	32 (+12)	17 October 2020	23rd	Apertura 2018	Champions (4 times)	
3	América	32 (+9)	17 October 2020	34th	Apertura 2019	Champions (5 times)	
4	Cruz Azul	29 (+7)	16 October 2020	29th	Clausura 2019	Champions (Invierno 1997)	

Qualified to Reclassification round (8 teams)
Seed	Team	Points (GD)	Date of qualification	Appearance	Last appearance	Previous best	Ref.
5	Monterrey	29 (+5)	24 October 2020	24th	Apertura 2019	Champions (4 times)	
6	UANL	28	17 October 2020	26th	Apertura 2019	Champions (5 times)	
7	Guadalajara	26	25 October 2020	26th	Clausura 2017	Champions (3 times)	
8	Santos Laguna	25 (+4, 24 GF)	25 October 2020	31st	Apertura 2019	Champions (6 times)	
9	Pachuca	25 (+4, 18 GF)	25 October 2020	22nd	Clausura 2019	Champions (6 times)	
10	Necaxa	24	30 October 2020	18th	Apertura 2019	Champions (Invierno 1998)	
11	Toluca	21	6 November 2020	33rd	Apertura 2018	Champions (7 times)	
12	Puebla	20	6 November 2020	8th	Apertura 2015	Semifinals (3 times)	

== Format ==
=== Reclassification ===
- All games were played in a single-leg hosted by the higher seed
- If a game ended in a draw, it proceeded directly to a penalty shoot-out.

=== Liguilla ===
- Teams were re-seeded each round.
- The winners of the Reclassification matches were seeded based on their ranking in the classification table.
- Team with more goals on aggregate after two matches advanced.
- Away goals rule was applied in the quarter-finals and semi-finals, but not the final.
- In the quarter-finals and semi-finals, if the two teams were tied on aggregate and away goals, the higher seeded team advanced.
- In the final, if the two teams were tied after both legs, the match went to extra time and, if necessary, a shoot-out.
- Both finalists qualified to the 2022 CONCACAF Champions League.

== Reclassification ==
=== Summary ===
Matches took place on 21–22 November 2020.

Team 1	Score	Team 2
Monterrey	2–2 (2–4 p)	Puebla
UANL	2–1	Toluca
Guadalajara	1–0	Necaxa
Santos Laguna	0–3	Pachuca

=== Matches ===
21 November 2020
19:00 CST (UTC−6)

Santos Laguna	0–3	Pachuca
	Report	Guzmán 36'; Murillo 55'; De la Rosa 85'

Estadio Corona, Torreón
Referee: Marco Antonio Ortiz (Durango)

21 November 2020
21:10 CST (UTC−6)

Guadalajara	1–0	Necaxa
Angulo 54'	Report

Estadio Akron, Zapopan
Referee: César Arturo Ramos (Sinaloa)

22 November 2020
19:00 CST (UTC−6)

UANL	2–1	Toluca
Gignac 35', 38'	Report	Ayala 52' (o.g.)

Estadio Universitario, San Nicolás de los Garzas
Attendance: Fernando Hernández (Mexico City)

22 November 2020
21:10 CST (UTC−6)

Monterrey	2–2	Puebla
Sánchez 44' (pen.); Janssen 50' (pen.)	Report	Martínez 61'; Ormeño 90' (pen.)
Penalties
Pabón (penalty scored); Sánchez (penalty missed); Funes Mori (penalty scored); Vegas (penalty missed)	2–4	(penalty missed) Salas; (penalty scored) Martínez; (penalty scored) Vikonis; (penalty scored) Ormeño; (penalty scored) Corral

Estadio BBVA, Guadalupe
Referee: Fernando Guerrero (Mexico City)

== Seeding ==
The following was the final seeding for the final phase. The winners of the Reclassification matches were seeded based on their position in the classification table.

Seed	Team	Pld	W	D	L	GF	GA	GD	Pts
1	León	17	12	4	1	27	14	+13	40
2	UNAM	17	8	8	1	29	17	+12	32
3	América	17	9	5	3	31	22	+9	32
4	Cruz Azul	17	9	2	6	23	16	+7	29
5	UANL	17	7	7	3	27	16	+11	28
6	Guadalajara	17	7	5	5	20	17	+3	26
7	Pachuca	17	6	7	4	18	14	+4	25
8	Puebla	17	6	2	9	22	25	−3	20

Source: Liga MX
Rules for classification: 1) Points; 2) Goal difference; 3) Goals scored; 4) Away goals scored; 5) Drawing of lots.

== Bracket ==
Quarter-finals
1	León	1	2	3
8	Puebla	2	0	2
3	América	0	1	1
6	Guadalajara	1	2	3
2	UNAM	1	0	1
7	Pachuca	0	0	0
4	Cruz Azul	3	0	3
5	UANL	1	1	2

Semi-finals
1	León	1	1	2
6	Guadalajara	1	0	1
2	UNAM (s)	0	4	4
4	Cruz Azul	4	0	4

Finals
1	León	1	2	3
2	UNAM	1	0	1

== Quarter-finals ==
=== Summary ===
The first legs were played on 25–26 November, and the second legs were played on 28–29 November.

Team 1	Agg.	Team 2	1st leg	2nd leg
Puebla	2–3	León	2–1	0–2
Pachuca	0–1	UNAM	0–1	0–0
Guadalajara	3–1	América	1–0	2–1
UANL	2–3	Cruz Azul	1–3	1–0

=== First leg ===
25 November 2020
19:00 CST (UTC−6)

Puebla	2–1	León
Fernández 1'; Mosquera 37' (o.g.)	Report	Mena 43' (pen.)

Estadio Cuauhtémoc, Puebla
Referee: Erick Yair Miranda (Guanajuato)

25 November 2020
21:06 CST (UTC−6)

Guadalajara	1–0	América
Calderón 81'	Report

Estadio Akron, Zapopan
Attendance: 3,727
Referee: Jorge Isaac Rojas (Mexico City)

26 November 2020
19:00 CST (UTC−6)

UANL	1–3	Cruz Azul
Pizarro 46'	Report	Escobar 3'; Rodríguez 54'; Romo 71'

Estadio Universitario, San Nicolás de los Garzas
Referee: Diego Montaño Robles (Jalisco)

26 November 2020
21:06 CST (UTC−6)

Pachuca	0–1	UNAM
	Report	Álvarez 7'

Estadio Hidalgo, Pachuca
Referee: Eduardo Galván Basulto (Mexico City)

=== Second leg ===
28 November 2020
19:00 CST (UTC−6)

León	2–0	Puebla
Perg 5' (o.g.); Mena 30'	Report

Estadio León, León
Referee: César Arturo Ramos (Sinaloa)

León won 3–2 on aggregate.

28 November 2020
21:06 CST (UTC−6)

América	1–2	Guadalajara
Martín 75'	Report	Calderón 31', 72'

Estadio Azteca, Mexico City
Referee: Jorge Antonio Pérez (Veracruz)

Guadalajara won 3–1 on aggregate.

29 November 2020
12:00 CST (UTC−6)

UNAM	0–0	Pachuca
	Report

Estadio Olímpico Universitario, Mexico City
Referee: Fernando Hernández Gómez (Mexico City)

UNAM won 1–0 on aggregate.

29 November 2020
18:30 CST (UTC−6)

Cruz Azul	0–1	UANL
	Report	L. Quiñones 83'

Estadio Azteca, Mexico City
Referee: Marco Antonio Ortiz (Durango)

Cruz Azul won 3–2 on aggregate.

== Semi-finals ==
=== Summary ===
The first legs were played on 2–3 December, and the second legs were played on 5–6 December.

Team 1	Agg.	Team 2	1st leg	2nd leg
Guadalajara	1–2	León	1–1	0–1
Cruz Azul	4–4 (s)	UNAM	4–0	0–4

=== First leg ===
2 December 2020
21:05 CST (UTC−6)

Guadalajara	1–1	León
Macías 52' (pen.)	Report	Navarro 38'

Estadio Akron, Zapopan
Referee: Marco Antonio Ortiz (Durango)

3 December 2020
21:00 CST (UTC−6)

Cruz Azul	4–0	UNAM
Alvarado 2'; Baca 8'; Romo 13', 90+5'	Report

Estadio Azteca, Mexico City
Referee: Jorge Isaac Rojas (Mexico City)

=== Second leg ===
5 December 2020
21:00 CST (UTC−6)

León	1–0	Guadalajara
Campbell 18'	Report

Estadio León, León
Referee: Diego Montaño Robles (Jalisco)

León won 2–1 on aggregate.

6 December 2020
18:30 CST (UTC−6)

UNAM	4–0	Cruz Azul
Dinenno 4', 37'; C. González 41'; Vigón 89'	Report

Estadio Olímpico Universitario, Mexico City
Referee: César Arturo Ramos (Sinaloa)

4–4 on aggregate and tied on away goals. UNAM advanced due to being the higher seed in the classification table.

== Finals ==
Team 1	Agg.	Team 2	1st leg	2nd leg
UNAM	1–3	León	1–1	0–2

=== First leg ===
10 December 2020
21:00 CST (UTC−6)

UNAM	1–1	León
C. González 72'	Report	Gigliotti 89'

Estadio Olímpico Universitario, Mexico City
Referee: Fernando Hernández Gómez (Mexico City)

==== Details ====
UNAM	León

GK	20	(Mexico) Julio González
DF	3	(Mexico) Alejandro Mayorga
DF	23	(Argentina) Nicolás Freire
DF	5	(Mexico) Johan Vásquez
DF	2	(Mexico) Alan Mozo
MF	11	(Paraguay) Juan Iturbe		(substituted off) 53'
MF	17	(Mexico) Leonel López		(substituted off) 78'
MF	8	(Mexico) Andrés Iniestra (c)	(yellow card) 90+4'
MF	22	(Mexico) Juan Pablo Vigón
FW	32	(Paraguay) Carlos González	(yellow card) 55'	(substituted off) 86'
FW	9	(Argentina) Juan Ignacio Dinenno
Substitutions:
GK	42	(Mexico) Alex Cruz
DF	4	(Mexico) Luis Quintana
DF	16	(Mexico) Jerónimo Rodríguez		(substituted on) 86'
DF	19	(Mexico) Jesús Rivas
MF	7	(United States) Sebastian Saucedo
MF	13	(Mexico) Gerardo Moreno
MF	14	(Mexico) Carlos Gutiérrez		(substituted on) 53'
MF	200	(Mexico) Amaury García
MF	212	(Mexico) Erik Lira		(substituted on) 78'
FW	29	(Mexico) Bryan Mendoza
Manager:
(Argentina) Andrés Lillini

GK	30	(Mexico) Rodolfo Cota
DF	6	(Colombia) William Tesillo
DF	4	(Colombia) Andrés Mosquera
DF	21	(Colombia) Jaine Barreiro	(yellow card) 65' (yellow-red card) 81'
DF	5	(Mexico) Fernando Navarro		(substituted off) 90+3'
MF	8	(Mexico) José Iván Rodríguez		(substituted off) 68'
MF	18	(Peru) Pedro Aquino
MF	16	(Chile) Jean Meneses		(substituted off) 84'
MF	10	(Mexico) Luis Montes (c)
MF	13	(Ecuador) Ángel Mena
FW	12	(Costa Rica) Joel Campbell		(substituted off) 46'
Substitutions:
GK	23	(Mexico) Alfonso Blanco
DF	3	(Mexico) Gil Burón
DF	24	(Mexico) Osvaldo Rodríguez
DF	35	(Mexico) Juan Ignacio González		(substituted on) 84'
MF	28	(Mexico) David Ramírez		(substituted on) 68'
MF	32	(Mexico) Jesse Zamudio
MF	14	(Mexico) Jesús Godínez		(substituted on) 90+3'
MF	15	(Mexico) Iván Ochoa
FW	19	(Uruguay) Nicolás Sosa
FW	20	(Argentina) Emmanuel Gigliotti		(substituted on) 46'
Manager:
(Mexico) Ignacio Ambríz

Assistant referees:
Christian Espinosa Zavala (Mexico City)
Enríque Isaac Bustos (Guerrero)
Fourth official:
Jorge Isaac Rojas (Mexico City)
Video assistant referee:
Arturo Cruz Hurtado (Mexico City)
Assistant video assistant referee:
Carlos Ayala Cuéllar (Mexico City)

==== Statistics ====
Statistic	UNAM	León
Goals scored	1	1
Total shots	14	9
Shots on target	4	2
Saves	1	3
Ball possession	47%	53%
Corner kicks	3	2
Fouls committed	19	11
Offsides	1	3
Yellow cards	2	0
Red cards	0	1

=== Second leg ===
13 December 2020
20:30 CST (UTC−6)

León	2–0	UNAM
Gigliotti 12'; Moreno 83'	Report

Estadio León, León
Referee: Jorge Antonio Pérez (Veracruz)

León won 3–1 on aggregate.

==== Details ====
León	UNAM

GK	30	(Mexico) Rodolfo Cota
DF	6	(Colombia) William Tesillo
DF	4	(Colombia) Andrés Mosquera	(yellow card) 61'
DF	35	(Mexico) Ignacio González (c)
DF	5	(Mexico) Fernando Navarro		(substituted off) 87'
MF	16	(Chile) Jean Meneses		(substituted off) 80'
MF	18	(Peru) Pedro Aquino
MF	28	(Mexico) David Ramírez
MF	10	(Mexico) Luis Montes
MF	13	(Ecuador) Ángel Mena		(substituted off) 15'
FW	20	(Argentina) Emmanuel Gigliotti		(substituted off) 87'
Substitutions:
GK	1	(Mexico) Guillermo Pozos
DF	3	(Mexico) Gil Burón
DF	24	(Mexico) Osvaldo Rodríguez
MF	8	(Mexico) Iván Rodríguez
MF	11	(Colombia) Yairo Moreno		(substituted on) 80'
MF	32	(Mexico) Jesse Zamudio
FW	12	(Costa Rica) Joel Campbell	(yellow card) 75'	(substituted on) 15' (substituted off) 80'
FW	14	(Mexico) Jesús Godínez		(substituted on) 87'
FW	15	(Mexico) Iván Ochoa		(substituted on) 80'
FW	19	(Uruguay) Nicolás Sosa		(substituted on) 87'
Manager:
(Mexico) Ignacio Ambríz

GK	1	(Mexico) Alfredo Talavera
DF	3	(Mexico) Alejandro Mayorga
DF	23	(Argentina) Nicolás Freire	(yellow card) 45+4'
DF	5	(Mexico) Johan Vásquez		(substituted off) 59'
DF	2	(Mexico) Alan Mozo	(yellow card) 29'
MF	17	(Mexico) Leonel López		(substituted off) 70'
MF	8	(Mexico) Andrés Iniestra (c)
MF	22	(Mexico) Juan Pablo Vigón
MF	14	(Mexico) Carlos Gutiérrez		(substituted off) 39'
FW	32	(Paraguay) Carlos González
FW	9	(Argentina) Juan Ignacio Dinenno
Substitutions:
GK	20	(Mexico) Julio González
DF	4	(Mexico) Luis Quintana
DF	16	(Mexico) Jerónimo Rodríguez
MF	7	(United States) Sebastian Saucedo
MF	10	(Argentina) Favio Álvarez	(yellow card) 62'	(substituted on) 59'
MF	12	(Uruguay) Facundo Waller
MF	13	(Mexico) Gerardo Moreno
MF	200	(Mexico) Amaury García
FW	212	(Mexico) Erik Lira		(substituted on) 70'
FW	11	(Paraguay) Juan Iturbe		(substituted on) 39'
Manager:
(Argentina) Andrés Lillini

Assistant referees:
Michel Alejandro Morales (Mexico City)
Karen Janet Díaz (Aguascalientes)
Fourth official:
Diego Montaño Robles (Jalisco)
Video assistant referee:
Erick Yair Miranda (Guanajuato)
Assistant video assistant referee:
Fabrice Paul Plancon-Jallet

==== Statistics ====
Statistic	León	UNAM
Goals scored	2	0
Total shots	9	9
Shots on target	4	4
Saves	4	2
Ball possession	41%	59%
Corner kicks	1	6
Fouls committed	14	18
Offsides	2	0
Yellow cards	2	3
Red cards	0	0

== Statistics ==
=== Goalscorers ===
There were 41 goals scored in 18 matches, for an average of 2.28 goals per match.

3 goals

- (Mexico) Cristian Calderón (Guadalajara)
- (Mexico) Luis Romo (Cruz Azul)

2 goals

- (Argentina) Juan Ignacio Dinenno (UNAM)
- (Argentina) Emmanuel Gigliotti (León)
- (France) André-Pierre Gignac (UANL)
- (Paraguay) Carlos González (UNAM)
- (Ecuador) Ángel Mena (León)

1 goal

- (Mexico) Roberto Alvarado (Cruz Azul)
- (Argentina) Favio Álvarez (UNAM)
- (Mexico) Jesús Angulo (Guadalajara)
- (Mexico) Rafael Baca (Cruz Azul)
- (Costa Rica) Joel Campbell (León)
- (Mexico) Roberto de la Rosa (Pachuca)
- (Paraguay) Juan Escobar (Cruz Azul)
- (Colombia) Omar Fernández (Puebla)
- (Mexico) Víctor Guzmán (Pachuca)
- (Netherlands) Vincent Janssen (Monterrey)
- (Mexico) José Juan Macías (Guadalajara)
- (Mexico) Henry Martín (América)
- (Paraguay) Osvaldo Martínez (Puebla)
- (Colombia) Yairo Moreno (León)
- (Colombia) Óscar Murillo (Pachuca)
- (Mexico) Fernando Navarro (León)
- (Mexico) Santiago Ormeño (Puebla)
- (Argentina) Guido Pizarro (UANL)
- (Colombia) Luis Quiñones (UANL)
- (Uruguay) Jonathan Rodríguez (Cruz Azul)
- (Argentina) Nicolás Sánchez (Monterrey)
- (Mexico) Juan Pablo Vigón (UNAM)

1 own goal

- (Mexico) Hugo Ayala (against Toluca)
- (Colombia) Andrés Mosquera (against Puebla)
- (Uruguay) Maximiliano Perg (against León)

=== Assists ===
2 assists

- (Mexico) Roberto Alvarado (Cruz Azul)
- (Mexico) Javier Aquino (UANL)
- (Mexico) Orbelín Pineda (Cruz Azul)

1 assist

- (Mexico) Érick Aguirre (Pachuca)
- (Mexico) Uriel Antuna (Guadalajara)
- (Costa Rica) Joel Campbell (León)
- (Chile) Víctor Dávila (Pachuca)
- (Mexico) Alonso Escoboza (América)
- (Mexico) Santiago Giménez (Cruz Azul)
- (Mexico) Pablo González (Puebla)
- (Mexico) Carlos Gutiérrez (UNAM)
- (Mexico) Luis Montes (León)
- (Mexico) Alan Mozo (UNAM)
- (Mexico) Fernando Navarro (León)
- (Mexico) Oribe Peralta (Guadalajara)
- (Mexico) David Ramírez (León)
- (Mexico) Luis Romo (Cruz Azul)
- (Mexico) Juan Pablo Vigón (UNAM)
