= 2020–21 Tigres UANL season =

Tigres UANL
2020–21 season
- Chairman: Mauricio Culebro
- Manager: Ricardo Ferretti (until May 8 2021)
- Stadium: Estadio Universitario
- Liga MX: 5th
- CONCACAF Champions League: Winners
- FIFA Club World Cup: Runner-up
- Top goalscorer: League: André-Pierre Gignac (16); All: André-Pierre Gignac (19)
Home colours	Away colours	Third colours

During the 2020–21 season, Tigres UANL competed in the Liga MX, the latter stages of the delayed 2020 CONCACAF Champions League and the FIFA Club World Cup, having qualified for the latter competition after winning the Champions League in December 2020.

== Competitive ==
=== Liga MX Guardinaes 2020 ===
==== Table ====
Pos	Team	Pld	W	D	L	GF	GA	GD	Pts	Qualification
4	Cruz Azul	17	9	2	6	23	16	+7	29	Qualification for the quarter-finals (Note: The first four places in the table qualified for the Liguilla quarter-finals.)
5	Monterrey	17	8	5	4	26	21	+5	29	Qualification for the Reclassification (Note: Teams ranked 5th to 12th in the table qualified for Reclassification)
6	UANL	17	7	7	3	27	16	+11	28	Qualification for the Reclassification
7	Guadalajara	17	7	5	5	20	17	+3	26	Qualification for the Reclassification
8	Santos Laguna	17	7	4	6	24	20	+4	25	Qualification for the Reclassification

Source: Liga MX
Rules for classification: 1) Points; 2) Goal difference; 3) Number of goals scored; 4) Head-to-head results between tied teams; 5) Number of goals scored away; 6) Highest relegation coefficient; 7) Fair Play points

==== Playoffs ====
===== Reclassification =====
22 November 2020	UANL	2–1	Toluca	San Nicolás de los Garzas
19:00 CST (UTC−6)	Gignac 35', 38'	Report	Ayala 52' (o.g.)	Stadium: Estadio Universitario; Attendance: 0 Referee: Fernando Hernández (Mexico City)

===== Quarter-finals =====
26 November 2020 First leg	UANL	1–3	Cruz Azul	San Nicolás de los Garzas
19:00 CST (UTC−6)	Pizarro 46'	Report	Escobar 3'; Rodríguez 54'; Romo 71'	Stadium: Estadio Universitario; Attendance: 0

29 November 2020 Second leg	Cruz Azul	0–1 (3–2 agg.)	UANL	Mexico City
18:30 CST (UTC−6)		Report	L. Quiñones 83'	Stadium: Estadio Azteca; Attendance: 0 Referee: Marco Antonio Ortiz (Durango)

=== CONCACAF Champions League ===
==== Quarter-finals ====
11 March 2020 First leg	New York City FC (United States)	0–1	(Mexico) UANL	Harrison, United States
20:00 (20:00 UTC−4)		Report	Vargas 90+3'	Stadium: Red Bull Arena; Attendance: 10,212; Referee: Juan Gabriel Calderón (Costa Rica)

15 December 2020 Second leg	UANL (Mexico)	4–0 (5–0 agg.)	(United States) New York City FC	Orlando, United States
22:30	Gignac 30'; Fernández 49'; Carioca 64'; Aquino 85'	Report		Stadium: Exploria Stadium; Attendance: 0 Referee: Daneon Parchment (Jamaica)
Note: The home match of UANL in the quarter-finals was originally scheduled to take place at Estadio Universitario, San Nicolás de los Garza on 17 March 2020 (20:00 UTC−6).

==== Semi-finals ====
19 December 2020	UANL (Mexico)	3–0	(Honduras) Olimpia	Orlando, United States
20:00	Gignac 45+4' (pen.), 57' (pen.); Oliva 78' (o.g.)	Report		Stadium: Exploria Stadium; Attendance: 0 Referee: Iván Barton (El Salvador)

==== Final ====
22 December 2020 Final	UANL (Mexico)	2–1	(United States) Los Angeles FC	Orlando, United States
22:00	Ayala 72'; Gignac 84'	Report	Rossi 61'	Stadium: Exploria Stadium; Attendance: 0 Referee: Mario Escobar (Guatemala)

=== FIFA Club World Cup ===
4 February 2021 Quarterfinals	UANL (Mexico)	2–1	(South Korea) Ulsan Hyundai	Al Rayyan, Qatar
17:00	Gignac 38', 45+5' (pen.)	Report	Kim Kee-hee 24'	Stadium: Ahmed bin Ali Stadium; Attendance: 0 Referee: Esteban Ostojich (Uruguay)

7 February 2021 Semifinals	Palmeiras (Brazil)	0–1	(Mexico) UANL	Al Rayyan, Qatar
21:00		Report	Gignac 54' (pen.)	Stadium: Education City Stadium; Attendance: 0 Referee: Danny Makkelie (Netherlands)

11 February 2021 Final	Bayern Munich (Germany)	1–0	(Mexico) UANL	Al Rayyan, Qatar
21:00 AST	Pavard 59'	Report		Stadium: Education City Stadium; Attendance: 0 Referee: Esteban Ostojich (Uruguay)
