= 2015 CONCACAF U-20 Championship qualifying =

The qualifying competitions for the 2015 CONCACAF U-20 Championship were handled by two regional of CONCACAF's bodies; the Caribbean Football Union (Caribbean zone) and the Central American Football Union (Central American zone).

Representative teams from Canada, Mexico and the United States automatically qualified for the final competition.

== Caribbean zone ==
2014 CFU Men's U-20 Tournament
2015 CONCACAF U-20 Championship qualifying (Caribbean zone)
- The official logo of the U-20 Tournament

Tournament details
- Host countries: Cuba; Dominican Republic; Haiti; Aruba; Curaçao (first round groups); Trinidad and Tobago (finals)
- Dates: 25 June – 3 August (first round); 12–19 September 2014 (finals)
- Teams: 20 (total); 8 (finals) (from 1 sub-confederation)

Final positions
- Champions: Trinidad and Tobago
- Runners-up: Haiti
- Third place: Cuba
- Fourth place: Aruba

Tournament statistics
- Matches played: 41
- Goals scored: 161 (3.93 per match)
- Top scorer(s): (Saint Lucia) Travis Meril (total; 8 goals) (Trinidad and Tobago) Kadeem Corbin (finals; 5 goals)
- Best player: (Trinidad and Tobago) Kadeem Corbin
- Best goalkeeper: (Aruba) Jean-Marc Antersijn
- Fair play award: Aruba

The Caribbean qualification competition (2014 CFU Men's U-20 Tournament) was organised by the Caribbean Football Union (CFU).

All match times are UTC−4.

=== Teams ===
A total of 20 teams entered the competition.

Round	Teams entering round	No. of teams
Did not enter	Bahamas; Bonaire; British Virgin Islands; French Guiana; Guyana; Jamaica (Note: Jamaica were withdrawn from the Second round, they are to host the 2015 CONCACAF U-20 Championship.); Montserrat; Puerto Rico; Saint Martin; Sint Maarten; U.S. Virgin Islands	11
First round	Anguilla; Aruba; Antigua and Barbuda; Barbados; Bermuda; Cayman Islands; Cuba; Curaçao; Dominica; Dominican Republic; Grenada; Guadeloupe; Haiti; Martinique; Saint Kitts and Nevis; Saint Lucia; Saint Vincent and the Grenadines; Suriname; Turks and Caicos Islands	19
Second round	Trinidad and Tobago	1

=== First round ===
The teams taking part in the first round were announced on 21 June 2014. The group winners and the two best runners-up advanced to the final round.

==== Group 1 ====
Pos	Team	Pld	W	D	L	GF	GA	GD	Pts	Qualification
1	Cuba (H)	3	1	2	0	6	4	+2	5	Qualify to Final round
2	Martinique	3	1	1	1	4	5	−1	4	
3	Barbados	3	0	3	0	3	3	0	3	
4	Saint Vincent and the Grenadines	3	0	2	1	2	3	−1	2	

Source: CFU
(H) Hosts
25 June 2014
15:00

Barbados	1–1	Martinique
Hunte 52'	Report	Sellaye 5'

Estadio Pedro Marrero, Havana
Referee: Alain Georges (Haiti)
25 June 2014
17:00

Cuba	1–1	Saint Vincent and the Grenadines
Lopez 46'	Report	Ledger 90+1'

Estadio Pedro Marrero, Havana
Referee: John Pitti (Panama)

27 June 2014
15:00

Martinique	2–1	Saint Vincent and the Grenadines
Defrel 10'; Thimon 35'	Report	Solomon 80'

Estadio Pedro Marrero, Havana
Referee: Ameth Sanchez (Panama)
27 June 2014
17:00

Cuba	2–2	Barbados
Lopez 46', 90+2'	Report	Boyce 43', 55' (pen.)

Estadio Pedro Marrero, Havana
Referee: Dwight Royal (Jamaica)

29 June 2014
15:00

Saint Vincent and the Grenadines	0–0	Barbados
	Report

Estadio Pedro Marrero, Havana
Referee: Dwight Royal (Jamaica)
29 June 2014
17:00

Cuba	3–1	Martinique
Lopez 39', 61'; Rosales 85'	Report	Thimon 90'

Estadio Pedro Marrero, Havana
Referee: John Pitti (Panama)

==== Group 2 ====
Pos	Team	Pld	W	D	L	GF	GA	GD	Pts	Qualification
1	Dominican Republic (H)	3	2	0	1	3	3	0	6	Qualify to Final round
2	Antigua and Barbuda	3	1	1	1	3	1	+2	4	
3	Bermuda	3	1	1	1	4	5	−1	4	
4	Guadeloupe	3	1	0	2	4	5	−1	3	

Source: CFU
(H) Hosts
25 June 2014
15:00

Guadeloupe	3–4	Bermuda
Malpon 16', 84'; Antoine 74'	Report	Ratteray-Smith 17'; Simons 40', 50', 65'

Estadio Panamericano, San Cristóbal
Referee: Allan Jacques (Haiti)
25 June 2014
17:00

Dominican Republic	0–3	Antigua and Barbuda
	Report	Harriette 15', 76'; Stevens 63'

Estadio Panamericano, San Cristóbal
Referee: Wilson Da Costa (Bahamas)

27 June 2014
15:00

Antigua and Barbuda	0–1	Guadeloupe
	Report	Annerose 83'

Estadio Panamericano, San Cristóbal
Referee: Walner Laventure (Haiti)
27 June 2014
17:00

Dominican Republic	2–0	Bermuda
Feliz 7'; Quezada 90+4'	Report

Estadio Panamericano, San Cristóbal
Referee: Vivian Robinson (Saint Lucia)

29 June 2014
15:00

Bermuda	0–0	Antigua and Barbuda
	Report

Estadio Panamericano, San Cristóbal
Referee: Walner Laventure (Haiti)
29 June 2014
17:00

Dominican Republic	1–0	Guadeloupe
Puello 39'	Report

Estadio Panamericano, San Cristóbal
Referee: Wilson Da Costa (Bahamas)

==== Group 3 ====
Pos	Team	Pld	W	D	L	GF	GA	GD	Pts	Qualification
1	Haiti (H)	3	3	0	0	16	1	+15	9	Qualify to Final round
2	Suriname	3	2	0	1	14	5	+9	6	Qualify to Final round
3	Saint Lucia	3	1	0	2	20	10	+10	3	
4	Turks and Caicos Islands	3	0	0	3	0	34	−34	0	

Source: CFU
(H) Hosts
18 July 2014
17:00

Suriname	7–0	Turks and Caicos Islands
Faerber 20', 60' (pen.), 72'; Fer 31'; Asoman 48'; Slagveer 75'; Khoen Khoen 90'	Report

Stade Sylvio Cator, Port-au-Prince
Referee: Juan Carlos Hidalgo (Domicican Republic)
18 July 2014
19:00

Haiti	4–0	Saint Lucia
Valerius 10'; Campoy 34'; Saint-Vil 36'; Cherenfant 43'	Report

Stade Sylvio Cator, Port-au-Prince
Referee: William Anderson (Puerto Rico)

20 July 2014
17:00

Suriname	6–3	Saint Lucia
Faerber 7', 29' (pen.); Asoman 36'; Khoen Khoen 47'; Fer 66'; Rozenblad 80'	Report	Goodman 5'; Joseph 65'; Meril 71'

Stade Sylvio Cator, Port-au-Prince
Referee: William Anderson (Puerto Rico)
20 July 2014
19:00

Haiti	10–0	Turks and Caicos Islands
Valerius 6'; Louima 10'; Herivaux 17'; Salvant 23', 31'; Joseph 36', 60'; St. Fort 47'; St. Jean 73'; Désiré 84'	Report

Stade Sylvio Cator, Port-au-Prince
Referee: Yadel Martinez Pupo (Cuba)

22 July 2014
17:00

Saint Lucia	17–0	Turks and Caicos Islands
Myers 4'; Meril 6', 7', 15', 27', 39', 55', 70'; Abraham 12'; Goodman 17'; Neptune 22', 33', 38', 54', 86'; Joseph 79', 81'	Report

Stade Sylvio Cator, Port-au-Prince
Referee: Yadel Martinez Pupo (Cuba)
22 July 2014
19:00

Haiti	2–1	Suriname
Joseph 10'; Campoy 58'	Report	Asoman 3'

Stade Sylvio Cator, Port-au-Prince
Referee: Kevin Morrison (Jamaica)

==== Group 4 ====
Pos	Team	Pld	W	D	L	GF	GA	GD	Pts	Qualification
1	Aruba (H)	2	2	0	0	2	0	+2	6	Qualify to Final round
2	Grenada	2	1	0	1	3	2	+1	3	
3	Dominica	2	0	0	2	1	4	−3	0	

Source: CFU
(H) Hosts
18 July 2014
20:00

Dominica	1–3	Grenada
Soanes 88'	Report	Charles 43', 57'; Frank 85'

Complejo Guillermo Prospero Trinidad, Oranjestad
Referee: Trevor Taylor (Barbados)

20 July 2014
20:00

Aruba	1–0	Grenada
Homoet 7'	Report

Complejo Guillermo Prospero Trinidad, Oranjestad
Referee: Leo Clarke (Saint Lucia)

22 July 2014
20:00

Aruba	1–0	Dominica
Homoet 42'	Report

Complejo Guillermo Prospero Trinidad, Oranjestad
Referee: Leo Clarke (Saint Lucia)

==== Group 5 ====
Pos	Team	Pld	W	D	L	GF	GA	GD	Pts	Qualification
1	Curaçao (H)	3	2	0	1	12	1	+11	6	Qualify to Final round
2	Saint Kitts and Nevis	3	2	0	1	12	4	+8	6	Qualify to Final round
3	Cayman Islands	3	2	0	1	7	5	+2	6	
4	Anguilla	3	0	0	3	0	21	−21	0	

Source: CFU
(H) Hosts
30 July 2014
19:00

Anguilla	0–7	Saint Kitts and Nevis
	Report	T. Isaac 3', 62'; Saunders 12'; Nelson 23' (pen.), 47' (pen.); Bertie 61'; Hanley 77'

Stadion Ergilio Hato, Willemstad
Referee: Stanley Lancaster (Guyana)
30 July 2014
21:00

Curaçao	0–1	Cayman Islands
	Report	Webb 45+1'

Stadion Ergilio Hato, Willemstad
Referee: Sherwin Johnson (Guyana)

1 August 2014
19:00

Saint Kitts and Nevis	5–1	Cayman Islands
Barnes 15'; Z. Isaac 28'; Nelson 60'; Francis 83'; T. Isaac 90+3'	Report	Suberan 70'

Stadion Ergilio Hato, Willemstad
Referee: William Anderson (Puerto-Rico)
1 August 2014
21:00

Curaçao	9–0	Anguilla
Fortin 9'; Stokkel 17'; Marselina 35', 42', 85'; Felomina 39'; Christina 41'; Martis 51', 88'	Report

Stadion Ergilio Hato, Willemstad
Referee: Sherwin Moore (Guyana)

3 August 2014
17:00

Cayman Islands	5–0	Anguilla
Connelly 10'; Suberan 43'; Wilson 65'; Webb 70' (pen.); Nelson 83'	Report

Stadion Ergilio Hato, Willemstad
Referee: William Anderson (Puerto-Rico)
3 August 2014
19:00

Curaçao	3–0	Saint Kitts and Nevis
Albertus 58'; Marselina 65', 71'	Report

Stadion Ergilio Hato, Willemstad
Referee: Stanley Lancaster (Guyana)

==== Ranking of runners-up ====
On 22 June 2014, CFU published that the best ranked runner-up also qualifies for the Second round. On 26 June 2014, CONCACAF published that the best and second best ranked runner-up qualifier for the Second Round. Since Group 4 contains three teams, only the results against the first and third placed teams are counted.

Pos	Team	Pld	W	D	L	GF	GA	GD	Pts	Qualification
1	Antigua and Barbuda	2	1	1	0	3	0	+3	4	
2	Suriname	2	1	0	1	7	5	+2	3	Qualify to Final round
3	Saint Kitts and Nevis	2	1	0	1	5	4	+1	3	Qualify to Final round
4	Grenada	2	1	0	1	3	2	+1	3	
5	Martinique	2	0	1	1	2	4	−2	1	

Source: CFU

=== Final round ===
The final round was hosted in Trinidad and Tobago.

On 22 June 2014, CFU announced that Jamaica would also receive a bye to the Second round, however four days later CONCACAF published that the second-best ranked runner-up would be taking part in the Second round.

The groups and resulting fixtures were changed at a later date. Antigua and Barbuda were removed and Saint Kitts and Nevis added (no explanation given). The top two from each group advanced to the 2015 CONCACAF U-20 Championship.

==== Group A ====
Pos	Team	Pld	W	D	L	GF	GA	GD	Pts	Qualification
1	Trinidad and Tobago (H)	3	2	1	0	7	2	+5	7	Qualify to CONCACAF U-20 Championship & Final
2	Cuba	3	1	1	1	2	2	0	4	Qualify to CONCACAF U-20 Championship & Third place playoff
3	Curaçao	3	1	0	2	3	7	−4	3 (Note: Curacao wins hth)	
4	Suriname	3	1	0	2	4	5	−1	3	

Source: CFU
(H) Hosts
Notes:
12 September 2014
17:00

Curaçao	0–1	Cuba
	Report	Saname 51'

Hasely Crawford Stadium, Port of Spain
Referee: Wilson Da Costa (Bahamas)
12 September 2014
19:15

Trinidad and Tobago	2–1	Suriname
Fortune 27' (pen.); Mitchell 78'	Report	Faerber 5'

Hasely Crawford Stadium, Port of Spain
Referee: Leo Clarke (Saint Lucia)

14 September 2014
16:00

Cuba	0–1	Suriname
	Report	Faerber 45+1'

Hasely Crawford Stadium, Port of Spain
Referee: Walner Laventure (Haiti)
14 September 2014
18:15

Trinidad and Tobago	4–0	Curaçao
Mitchell 33'; Corbin 45' (pen.), 60'; Andrews 84'	Report

Hasely Crawford Stadium, Port of Spain
Referee: Kimbell Ward (St Kitts & Nevis)

16 September 2014
17:00

Suriname	2–3	Curaçao
Faerber 15'; Grando 27'	Report	Marselia 22', 53', 80'

Hasely Crawford Stadium, Port of Spain
Referee: Wilson Da Costa (Bahamas)
16 September 2014
19:15

Trinidad and Tobago	1–1	Cuba
Trimmingham 88'	Report	Lopez 10'

Hasely Crawford Stadium, Port of Spain
Referee: Leo Clarke (Saint Lucia)

==== Group B ====
Pos	Team	Pld	W	D	L	GF	GA	GD	Pts	Qualification
1	Haiti	3	3	0	0	9	4	+5	9	Qualify to CONCACAF U-20 Championship & Final
2	Aruba	3	2	0	1	5	4	+1	6	Qualify to CONCACAF U-20 Championship & Third place playoff
3	Dominican Republic	3	1	0	2	5	5	0	3	
4	Saint Kitts and Nevis	3	0	0	3	4	10	−6	0	

Source: CFU
13 September 2014
16:00

Haiti	2–1	Dominican Republic
Joseph 20', 36'	Report	Matos 68'

Ato Boldon Stadium, Couva
Referee: Yadel Martinez Pupo (Cuba)
13 September 2014
18:15

Saint Kitts and Nevis	1–2	Aruba
Hanley 79'	Report	Ruiz 33' (pen.); Wernet 55'

Ato Boldon Stadium, Couva
Referee: Moeth Gaymes (St Vincent & Grenadines)

15 September 2014
17:00

Dominican Republic	3–1	Saint Kitts and Nevis
Feliz 33', 45'; Llanos 78'	Report	Mckoy 4'

Ato Boldon Stadium, Couva
Referee: William Anderson (Puerto Rico)
15 September 2014
19:15

Aruba	1–2	Haiti
Hodge 78'	Report	Fernander 14'; Campoy 20'

Ato Boldon Stadium, Couva
Referee: Johannes Dolaini (Suriname)

17 September 2014
17:00

Dominican Republic	1–2	Aruba
Puello 10'	Report	Wernet 83'; Geerman 90+2'

Ato Boldon Stadium, Couva
Referee: Moeth Gaymes (St Vincent & Grenadines)
17 September 2014
19:15

Saint Kitts and Nevis	2–5	Haiti
Bertie 74', 76'	Report	Cherenfant 4', 28'; Monpremier 7'; Désiré 17', 42'

Ato Boldon Stadium, Couva
Referee: Yadel Martinez Pupo (Cuba)

==== Third place playoff ====
19 September 2014
17:00

Cuba	2–1	Aruba
Saname 54'; Lopez 88'	Report	Hodge 85'

Hasely Crawford Stadium, Port of Spain
Referee: Leo Clarke (Saint Lucia)

==== Final ====
19 September 2014
19:30

Trinidad and Tobago	3–0	Haiti
Corbin 35', 82', 86'	Report

Hasely Crawford Stadium, Port of Spain
Referee: Yadel Martinez Pupo (Cuba)

==== Awards ====
Golden Boot

- (Trinidad and Tobago) Kadeem Corbin

MVP

- (Trinidad and Tobago) Kadeem Corbin

Golden Glove

- (Aruba) Jean-Marc Antersijn

Fair Play Award

- Aruba

== Central American zone ==
2015 CONCACAF U-20 Championship qualifying (Central American zone)
Tournament details
- Host country: El Salvador
- Dates: 17 July 2014 – 29 July 2014
- Teams: 7 (from 1 sub-confederation)

Final positions
- Champions: Panama
- Runners-up: El Salvador
- Third place: Honduras
- Fourth place: Guatemala

Tournament statistics
- Matches played: 21
- Goals scored: 78 (3.71 per match)
- Top scorer(s): (Panama) Ismael Díaz (Guatemala) Mauro Portillo (5 goals each)

The Central American qualification competition was organised by the Central American Football Union (UNCAF). The competition was contested by the seven UNCAF teams in a round-robin tournament, hosted in El Salvador, where the top four teams qualified for the 2015 CONCACAF U-20 Championship.

By winning this tournament, Panama qualified for the 2015 Pan American Games men's football tournament.

Pos	Team	Pld	W	D	L	GF	GA	GD	Pts	Qualification
1	Panama	6	5	0	1	18	7	+11	15	Qualify to CONCACAF U-20 Championship and Pan American Games
2	El Salvador (H)	6	3	2	1	18	6	+12	11	Qualify to CONCACAF U-20 Championship
3	Honduras	6	3	2	1	13	6	+7	11	Qualify to CONCACAF U-20 Championship
4	Guatemala	6	3	1	2	10	6	+4	10 (Note: Guatemala wins head-to-head)	Qualify to CONCACAF U-20 Championship
5	Costa Rica	6	3	1	2	13	6	+7	10	
6	Nicaragua	6	1	0	5	6	21	−15	3	
7	Belize	6	0	0	6	0	23	−23	0	

Source: UNCAF
(H) Hosts
Notes:

All match times are UTC−6.

17 July 2014
14:00

Guatemala	1–0	Costa Rica
Diego Palma 12'	Report

Estadio Cuscatlán, San Salvador
Referee: Armando Castro (Honduras)
17 July 2014
16:30

Honduras	3–4	Panama
Rembrandt Flores 16'; Elis 20'; Fredy Medina 85'	Report	Ismael Santos 6' (o.g.); Josue Hormecha 51'; Fidel Escobar 63'; Díaz 90+1'

Estadio Cuscatlán, San Salvador
Referee: Hugo Cruz (Costa Rica)
17 July 2014
19:00

El Salvador	6–0	Belize
Barahona 3' (pen.); Roberto Domínguez 44'; Bryan Pérez 62'; Josué Hernández 78', 89'; Bryan Tamacas 90+2'	Report

Estadio Cuscatlán, San Salvador
Referee: Óscar Reyna (Guatemala)

19 July 2014
14:00

Panama	5–0	Nicaragua
Josue Hormecha 2'; Díaz 21', 43'; Carlos Small 32'; Rubén Barrow 74'	Report

Estadio Las Delicias, Santa Tecla
Referee: Elmer Bonilla (El Salvador)
19 July 2014
16:30

Honduras	1–1	Costa Rica
Deybi Flores 23'	Report	Berny Burke 20'

Estadio Las Delicias, Santa Tecla
Referee: John Pitti (Panama)
19 July 2014
19:00

El Salvador	2–2	Guatemala
Barahona 63' (pen.); Josué Hernández 78' (pen.)	Report	Diego Palma 70'; Mauro Portillo 89' (pen.)

Estadio Las Delicias, Santa Tecla
Referee: Henry Bejarano (Costa Rica)

21 July 2014
14:00

Belize	0–4	Nicaragua
	Report	Serapio 6'; Ariagner Smith 65'; Hermes Navarette 74'; Bryan Garcia 83'

Estadio Cuscatlán, San Salvador
Referee: Hugo Cruz (Costa Rica)
21 July 2014
16:30

Costa Rica	2–3	Panama
Kenneth Cerdas 71'; Víctor Murillo 90+1'	Report	Díaz 1', 50'; Fidel Escobar 84'

Estadio Cuscatlán, San Salvador
Referee: Armando Castro (Honduras)
21 July 2014
19:00

El Salvador	0–0	Honduras
	Report

Estadio Cuscatlán, San Salvador
Referee: Óscar Reyna (Guatemala)

23 July 2014
14:00

Belize	0–2	Panama
	Report	Carlos Small 17'; Fidel Escobar 45+1'

Estadio Las Delicias, Santa Tecla
Referee: Óscar Davilla (Nicaragua)
23 July 2014
16:30

Nicaragua	0–2	Costa Rica
	Report	Kenneth Cerdas 66'; Randall Leal 90+1'

Estadio Las Delicias, Santa Tecla
Referee: John Pitti (Panama)
23 July 2014
19:00

Guatemala	0–1	Honduras
	Report	Junior Lacayo 40'

Estadio Las Delicias, Santa Tecla
Referee: Elmer Bonilla (El Salvador)

25 July 2014
14:00

Honduras	5–0	Belize
Junior Lacayo 42'; Rolin Alvarez 45'; Róchez 65', 74' (pen.); Fredy Medina 71'	Report

Estadio Cuscatlán, San Salvador
Referee: Óscar Reyna (Guatemala)
25 July 2014
16:30

Panama	3–0	Guatemala
Jhamal Rodríguez 8'; Ervin Zorrilla 67'; Jesús González 85'	Report

Estadio Cuscatlán, San Salvador
Referee: Armando Castro (Honduras)
25 July 2014
19:00

El Salvador	7–1	Nicaragua
Bryan Pérez 13' (pen.); Denis Pineda 28', 46'; Romilio Hernández 34', 44'; Bryan Landaverde 71'; Ronald Ventura 78'	Report	Yaser Ortiz 37'

Estadio Cuscatlán, San Salvador
Referee: Henry Bejarano (Costa Rica)

27 July 2014
14:00

Costa Rica	6–0	Belize
Randy Chirino 36', 85', 90+2'; Rene Miranda 38', 61'; Marcelo González 47'	Report

Estadio Las Delicias, Santa Tecla
Referee: Óscar Davilla (Nicaragua)
27 July 2014
16:30

Nicaragua	0–4	Guatemala
	Report	Christopher Paolo Ortíz 69'; Mauro Portillo 82', 85'; Pablo Aguilar 90+3'

Estadio Las Delicias, Santa Tecla
Referee: John Pitti (Panama)
27 July 2014
19:00

El Salvador	2–1	Panama
Denis Pineda 31'; Roberto Domínguez 82'	Report	Bryan Tamacas 86' (o.g.)

Estadio Las Delicias, Santa Tecla
Referee: Hugo Cruz (Costa Rica)

29 July 2014
14:00

Guatemala	3–0	Belize
Pablo Aguilar 26'; Mauro Portillo 36', 63'	Report

Estadio Cuscatlán, San Salvador
Referee: Elmer Bonilla (El Salvador)
29 July 2014
16:30

Honduras	3–1	Nicaragua
Róchez 4'; Junior Lacayo 11'; Deybi Flores 54'	Report	Yaser Ortiz 43'

Estadio Cuscatlán, San Salvador
Referee: Henry Bejarano (Costa Rica)
29 July 2014
19:00

El Salvador	1–2	Costa Rica
Denis Pineda 57'	Report	Alberth Villalobos 45'; Juan Vargas 79' (pen.)

Estadio Cuscatlán, San Salvador
Referee: Oscar Reyna (Guatemala)

== Qualified teams ==
North American zone

- Canada (automatic)
- Mexico (automatic)
- United States (automatic)

Central American zone

- Panama
- El Salvador
- Honduras
- Guatemala

Caribbean zone

- Jamaica (hosts)
- Trinidad and Tobago
- Cuba
- Haiti
- Aruba
