= Jesús Pérez =

Jesús Pérez may refer to:

- Jesús Pérez (water polo) (born 1948), Cuban Olympic water polo player
- Jesús Pérez (boxer) (born 1971), Colombian boxer
- Jesús Pérez (cyclist) (born 1984), Venezuelan road cyclist
- Jesús Pérez (footballer, born 1995), Trinidadian football left-back
- Jesus Perez (soccer, born 1997), American soccer play midfielder
- Jesús Pérez (footballer, born 2000), Mexican football midfielder
- Jesús Alejandro Pérez, Cuban-Canadian multi-instrumentalist and bandleader
