= Jean-Marc Antersijn =

Aruban professional footballer

Personal information
- Full name: Jean Marc Luis Antersijn
- Date of birth: January 5, 1996 (age 30)
- Place of birth: Noord, Aruba
- Height: 1.85 m (6 ft 1 in)
- Position: Goalkeeper

Team information
- Current team: Sporting Aruba

Senior career*
Years	Team	Apps	(Gls)
–2014	SV Dakota	9	(0)
2014–2015	Haaglandia		
2016–2017	GDA		
2017–2018	TEC	1	(0)
2018–2019	Boshuizen		
2020–2021	IFK Eskilstuna		
2021	Arlanda	1	(0)
2022	Atlantic City		
2025–	Sporting Aruba		

International career
2015	Aruba U20	5	(0)
2014–2015	Aruba	1	(0)
2022	Curaçao		
- * Club domestic league appearances and goals

Jean-Marc Antersijn (born 5 January 1996) is an Aruban professional football goalkeeper who plays for Sporting Aruba.

== Career ==
Following an internship with PEC Zwolle, Antersijn moved to Haaglandia to replace Jan Vermolen.

In 2017, he signed for TEC.

Before the 2021 season, he signed for FC Arlanda. In 2021, Antersijn signed for Atlantic City FC.

On 23 September 2025, Artersijn joined Sporting Aruba.

== International career ==
Antersijn won the Golden Glove Award for his superlative performances at the 2014 CFU U-20 Tournament. Aruba were awarded the Fair Play award as well.

Despite hoping to represent Aruba in the 2018 World Cup qualifiers, Antersijn only won one senior cap for his country, a friendly against Guam.

In 2022, Antersijn represented the Curaçao national team.

== Coaching career ==
At the same time Antersijn played in Sweden, he coached goalkeepers. In 2021, he started JM Academy International, a goalkeeping academy based in Aruba.

== Personal life ==
Antersijn was born in Aruba to a Chilean mother and a Curaçaoan father.
