= Chin Hormechea =

Panamanian footballer (born 1996)

Personal information
- Full name: Chin Jossue Hormechea Hoy
- Date of birth: May 12, 1996 (age 30)
- Place of birth: Panama
- Height: 1.79 m (5 ft 10 in)
- Position: Defender

Team information
- Current team: San Miguelito
- Number: 40

Senior career*
Years	Team	Apps	(Gls)
2013–2019	Árabe Unido	87	(2)
2020–	San Miguelito	30	(0)

International career^{‡}
2013	Panama U17	3	(0)
2015	Panama U20	8	(0)
2015–	Panama	2	(0)
- * Club domestic league appearances and goals as of 06:46, 9 November 2021 (UTC) ‡ National team caps and goals as of 06:45, 30 May 2018 (UTC)

Chin Jossue Hormechea Hoy (born 12 May 1996) is a Panamanian footballer who currently plays at Sporting San Miguelito.

== International career ==
Hormechea played at the 2013 FIFA U-17 World Cup in the United Arab Emirates and the 2015 FIFA U-20 World Cup in New Zealand.

He made his senior debut for Panama in a February 2015 friendly match against the United States.

== Honours ==
Panama U20

- CONCACAF U-20 Championship Runners-up: 2015
