= Jaime de Gracia =

Panamanian footballer (born 1996)

Personal information
- Full name: Jaime Antonio de Gracia Cortes
- Date of birth: 11 May 1996 (age 30)
- Place of birth: Panama City, Panama
- Height: 1.95 m (6 ft 5 in)
- Position: Goalkeeper

Senior career*
Years	Team	Apps	(Gls)
2013–2016	Tauro		
- Leones de América
2017–2018	Correcaminos UAT		
?–2020	Sporting San Miguelito		
2020–2021	Plaza Amador		
2022	Potros del Este		
2023–2024	Plaza Amador		

International career
2013	Panama U17	8	(0)
2015	Panama U20	9	(0)
2015	Panama U23	4	(0)
- * Club domestic league appearances and goals

Jaime Antonio de Gracia Cortes (born 11 May 1996) is a Panamanian professional footballer who plays as a goalkeeper.

== Club career ==
In 2017, de Gracia joined Mexican club Correcaminos UAT. In January 2020, he signed for Plaza Amador.

In April 2021, de Gracia ruptured both the anterior cruciate ligament and lateral collateral ligament in his left knee during a match between Plaza Amador and Potros del Este, which ruled him out for the rest of the 2021 Apertura tournament. He would not play again until October 2022, when he played for Potros del Este in a 2–0 win against Árabe Unido during the 2022 Liga LFP Clausura.

== International career ==
De Gracia played for Panama at youth level, and represented them at the 2013 FIFA U-17 World Cup, 2015 CONCACAF U-20 Championship, and 2015 FIFA U-20 World Cup. He also played for Panama at the 2015 Pan American Games, and in the 2015 CONCACAF Men's Olympic Qualifying Championship.

He was called up to the Panama national team for the first time in August 2016, for a match against Guatemala. He was called up again January 2019 for a match against the United States, but had to withdraw from the squad due to injury. De Gracia was later called up again to the national team in 2021 for the first round of 2022 FIFA World Cup qualification matches against Barbados and Dominica to replace Luis Mejía, who had tested positive for COVID-19.

De Gracia was also called up for the Panama national beach soccer team.

== Personal life ==
De Gracia is also nicknamed "Jimmy". In July 2019, he was accused by his ex-girlfriend of physical abuse.

== Honours ==
Individual

- CONCACAF U-20 Championship Golden Glove: 2015
