= Achik =

Achik is a surname. Notable people with the surname include:

- Abdelhak Achik (born 1959), Moroccan boxer
- Mohammed Achik (born 1965), Moroccan boxer
