= Érick Aguirre =

Mexican footballer (born 1997)

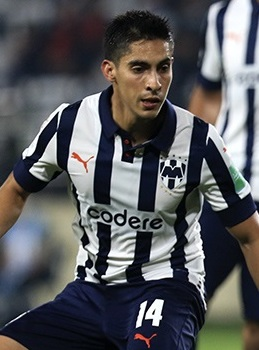
- Aguirre with Monterrey at the 2021 FIFA Club World Cup

Personal information
- Full name: Érick Germáin Aguirre Tafolla
- Date of birth: 23 February 1997 (age 29)
- Place of birth: La Ruana, Michoacán, Mexico
- Height: 1.74 m (5 ft 8 1/2 in)
- Position: Full-back

Team information
- Current team: Monterrey
- Number: 14

Youth career
- 2012–2015: Morelia

Senior career*
Years	Team	Apps	(Gls)
2014–2016	Morelia	37	(2)
2016–2021	Pachuca	142	(6)
2021–	Monterrey	121	(2)

International career^{‡}
2013	Mexico U17	12	(0)
2015	Mexico U20	11	(0)
2016–2021	Mexico U23	21	(0)
2018–	Mexico	14	(0)
Medal record
Men's football
Representing Mexico
CONCACAF Nations League
Runner-up	2024 United States
Olympic Games
Bronze medal – third place	2020 Tokyo	Team
Olympic Qualifying Championship
Winner	2020 Mexico
Winner	2015 United States
Toulon Tournament
Third place	2019 France	Team
FIFA U-17 World Cup
Runner-up	2013 United Arab Emirates	Team
CONCACAF U-20 Championship
Winner	2015 Jamaica	Team
CONCACAF U-17 Championship
Winner	2013 Panama	Team
- * Club domestic league appearances and goals as of 21 November 2026 ‡ National team caps and goals as of 21 March 2024

Érick Germáin Aguirre Tafolla (born 23 February 1997) is a Mexican professional footballer who plays as a full-back for Liga MX club Monterrey.

== Club career ==
=== Morelia ===
Aguirre made his senior debut with Morelia on 8 August 2014, in a 0–0 goalless draw. He would score his first goal with the team on 19 September 2014 in a 3–2 loss against Pumas UNAM.

=== Pachuca ===
On 8 June 2016, Pachuca announced the signing of Aguirre.

=== Monterrey ===
On 3 July 2021, Aguirre joined Monterrey.

== International career ==
=== Youth ===
Aguirre participated in the 2013 CONCACAF U-17 Championship in Panama. With Mexico winning the tournament, the team would go on to qualify to the 2013 FIFA U-17 World Cup. Aguirre would also go on to participate in the U-17 World Cup. During the final against Nigeria, he would score an own goal at the 9th minute as Mexico would go on to lose 3–0.

Aguirre was called up by Sergio Almaguer to participate in the 2015 CONCACAF U-20 Championship in Jamaica. Mexico would go on winning the tournament. Aguirre was then called up to participate in the 2015 FIFA U-20 World Cup with Mexico in New Zealand, where he would appear in all three group stage matches but Mexico would finish last in the group.

On 18 September 2015, Aguirre was selected by coach Raúl Gutierrez to play in the 2015 CONCACAF Olympic Qualifying Championship. Mexico would go onto the final, winning 2–0 over Honduras.

On 7 July 2016, Aguirre was named in Mexico's 18-man squad that would participate in the 2016 Summer Olympics in Rio de Janeiro, Brazil. He would only appear in two group stage matches as Mexico would be eliminated in the group stage.

In May 2019, he was called up by Jaime Lozano to participate in that year's Toulon Tournament. He would go on to appear in all matches as Mexico won third place in the competition.

He also participated at the 2020 CONCACAF Olympic Qualifying Championship, appearing as squad captain, where Mexico won the competition. He was subsequently called up to participate in the 2020 Summer Olympics. Aguirre won the bronze medal with the Olympic team.

=== Senior ===
Mexico interim manager, Ricardo Ferretti, called up Aguirre for the first time for September friendlies against Uruguay and the United States. He would make his debut with the senior national team on 11 September 2018 in a friendly match against the United States, losing 1–0.

== Style of play ==
Capable of playing as a holding midfielder or as a full-back, he has been described as able "to see the game in slow motion," innately possessing a perception of space of the players around him, and the vision to distribute passes.

He was listed in The Guardian's list of Next Generation 2014: 40 of the best young talents in world football.

== Career statistics ==
=== Club ===
As of match played on 21 November 2026

Club	Season	League			Cup		Continental		Global		Other		Total	
Club	Season	Division	Apps	Goals	Apps	Goals	Apps	Goals	Apps	Goals	Apps	Goals	Apps	Goals
Morelia	2014–15	Liga MX	17	2	4	2	—		—		—		21	4
Morelia	2015–16	Liga MX	20	0	3	0	—		—		—		23	0
Morelia	Total		37	2	7	2	—		—		—		44	4
Pachuca	2016–17	Liga MX	25	0	—		8 (Note: Appearances in CONCACAF Champions Cup)	1	—		—		33	1
Pachuca	2017–18	Liga MX	26	2	4	0	—		3 (Note: Appearances in FIFA Club World Cup)	0	—		33	2
Pachuca	2018–19	Liga MX	28	0	6	0	—		—		—		34	0
Pachuca	2019–20	Liga MX	27	1	4	0	—		—		—		31	1
Pachuca	2020–21	Liga MX	36	3	—		—		—		—		36	3
Pachuca	Total		142	6	14	0	8	1	3	0	—		167	7
Monterrey	2020–21	Liga MX	—		—		1	0	—		—		1	0
Monterrey	2021–22	Liga MX	26	1	—		—		2	0	—		28	1
Monterrey	2022–23	Liga MX	29	1	—		—		—		—		29	1
Monterrey	2023–24	Liga MX	20	0	—		4	0	—		5 (Note: Appearances in Leagues Cup)	0	29	0
Monterrey	2024–25	Liga MX	21	0	—		1	0	3	0	2	0	27	0
Monterrey	2025–26	Liga MX	18	0	—		2	0	—		2	0	22	0
Monterrey	2026–27	Liga MX	7	0	—		—		—		—		7	0
Monterrey	Total		121	2	—		8	0	5	0	9	0	143	2
Career total			300	10	21	2	16	1	8	0	9	0	354	13

=== International ===
As of match played on 21 March 2024

National team	Year	Apps	Goals
Mexico	2018	4	0
Mexico	2019	4	0
Mexico	2021	2	0
Mexico	2022	3	0
Mexico	2024	1	0
Total		14	0

== Honours ==
Morelia

- Supercopa MX: 2014

Pachuca

- CONCACAF Champions League: 2016–17

Monterrey

- CONCACAF Champions League: 2021

Mexico Youth

- CONCACAF U-17 Championship: 2013
- FIFA U-17 World Cup runner-up: 2013
- CONCACAF U-20 Championship: 2015
- CONCACAF Olympic Qualifying Championship: 2015, 2020
- Olympic Bronze Medal: 2020

Mexico

- CONCACAF Nations League runner-up: 2019–20, 2023–24; third place: 2022–23

Individual

- CONCACAF Olympic Qualifying Championship Best XI: 2015
