= Jesse Zamudio =

Mexican footballer (born 1999)

Personal information
- Full name: Jesse Zamudio García
- Date of birth: 8 March 1999 (age 27)
- Place of birth: Moroleón, Guanajuato, Mexico
- Height: 1.80 m (5 ft 11 in)
- Position: Midfielder

Team information
- Current team: Tlaxcala
- Number: 17

Youth career
- 2019–2021: León

Senior career*
Years	Team	Apps	(Gls)
2020–2023	León	8	(0)
2022	→ Atlético Morelia (loan)	16	(2)
2023–2025	Tlaxcala	50	(7)
2025–2026	Irapuato	12	(0)
2026–	Tlaxcala	0	(0)
- * Club domestic league appearances and goals as of 2022

Jesse Zamudio García (born 8 March 1999) is a Mexican professional footballer who plays as a midfielder for Liga de Expansión MX club Tlaxcala.

== Career statistics ==
=== Club ===
As of 14 April 2022

Club	Season	League			Cup		Continental		Other		Total	
Club	Season	Division	Apps	Goals	Apps	Goals	Apps	Goals	Apps	Goals	Apps	Goals
León	2019–20	Liga MX	2	0	—		—		—		2	0
León	2020–21	Liga MX	3	0	—		1 (Note: Appearance in Leagues Cup)	0	—		4	0
León	2021–22	Liga MX	3	0	—		—		—		3	0
León	Total		8	0	—		1	0	—		9	0
Atlético Morelia (loan)	2021–22	Liga de Expansión MX	16	2	—		—		—		16	2
Career total			24	2	0	0	1	0	0	0	25	2

== Honours ==
León

- Liga MX: Guardianes 2020
- Leagues Cup: 2021

Morelia

- Liga de Expansión MX: Clausura 2022
