= Gerardo Moreno =

Mexican footballer (born 1993)

Personal information
- Full name: Gerardo Moreno Cruz
- Date of birth: 29 November 1993 (age 32)
- Place of birth: Tampico, Tamaulipas, Mexico
- Height: 1.82 m (6 ft 0 in)
- Position: Defensive midfielder

Team information
- Current team: Correcaminos
- Number: 13

Youth career
- 2010–2013: Monterrey

Senior career*
| Years | Team | Apps | (Gls) |
| 2013–2014 | Monterrey | 15 | (0) |
| 2014–2016 | → Correcaminos (loan) | 47 | (0) |
| 2016–2017 | Tampico Madero | 29 | (1) |
| 2017–2020 | Sonora | 63 | (0) |
| 2020–2022 | Pumas | 6 | (0) |
| 2022 | → Pumas Tabasco (loan) | 14 | (0) |
| 2022– | Correcaminos | 62 | (5) |
- * Club domestic league appearances and goals as of 18:24, 6 June 2024 (UTC)

Gerardo Moreno Cruz (born 29 November 1993) is a Mexican professional footballer who plays as a defensive midfielder for Liga de Expansión MX club Correcaminos.

== Club career ==
Moreno signed for Pumas in the summer of 2020.
