= Maximiliano Perg =

Uruguayan footballer (born 1991)

Personal information
- Full name: Maximiliano Perg Schneider
- Date of birth: 16 September 1991 (age 35)
- Place of birth: Paysandú, Uruguay
- Height: 1.85 m (6 ft 1 in)
- Position: Centre-back

Team information
- Current team: River Plate
- Number: 21

Youth career
- Colón
- Litoral
- Huracán
- Litoral
- Desportivo Brasil
- 2010–2011: Fénix

Senior career*
Years	Team	Apps	(Gls)
2011–2016	Fénix	83	(1)
2016–2017	Peñarol	12	(0)
2017–2018	Toluca	18	(1)
2019	Defensor Sporting	6	(0)
2019–2021	Puebla	59	(1)
2021–2022	Querétaro	30	(1)
2023	Nacional	2	(0)
2024	Fénix	30	(0)
2025	Danubio	18	(0)
2026–	River Plate	2	(0)
- * Club domestic league appearances and goals as of 20 June 2026

Maximiliano Perg Schneider (born 16 September 1991) is an Uruguayan professional footballer who plays as a centre-back for Uruguayan Segunda División side River Plate.

== Career ==
=== Fénix ===
He signed for Atlético Fénix in 2011

=== Penarol ===
In 2016 he signed for Peñarol

=== Deportivo Toluca ===
On 27 July 2017, Perg signed for Deportivo Toluca of the Liga MX, he was assigned shirt number 4. He scored his first goal with on 27 August against Puebla.

=== Defensor Sporting ===
On 27 December 2018, Perg signed with Defensor Sporting.
