= Guillermo Martínez (footballer) =

Mexican footballer (born 1995)

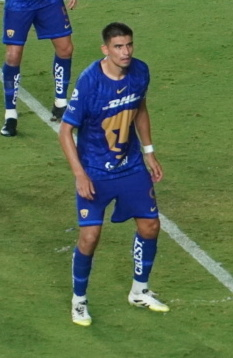
- Martínez with UNAM in 2025

Personal information
- Full name: Guillermo Martínez Ayala
- Date of birth: 15 March 1995 (age 31)
- Place of birth: Celaya, Mexico
- Height: 2.07 m (6 ft 9 in)
- Position: Forward

Team information
- Current team: Tigres UANL
- Number: 22

Youth career
- 2011–2016: Pachuca

Senior career*
Years	Team	Apps	(Gls)
2013–2019	Pachuca	9	(0)
2016	→ BUAP (loan)	15	(3)
2016	→ Coras (loan)	17	(8)
2017	→ Guadalajara (loan)	3	(0)
2017–2019	→ Zacatecas (loan)	60	(29)
2019–2020	Cafetaleros	19	(5)
2020	Celaya	16	(8)
2021–2023	Puebla	89	(23)
2024–2026	UNAM	82	(28)
2026–	Tigres UANL	7	(2)

International career^{‡}
2015	Mexico U20	10	(4)
2023–	Mexico	14	(3)
- * Club domestic league appearances and goals as of 7 November 2026 ‡ National team caps and goals as of 5 July 2026

Guillermo Martínez Ayala (born 15 March 1995), commonly known as "Memote", is a Mexican professional footballer who plays as a forward for Liga MX club Tigres UANL and the Mexico national team.

== Club career ==
=== Early career ===
Martínez began his footballing journey in the youth academy of Pachuca, where he developed before making his professional debut during the Clausura 2015. He first appeared for the senior side against Guadalajara under manager Diego Alonso.

=== Ascenso MX ===
Seeking regular first-team opportunities, Martínez joined Lobos BUAP for the Clausura 2016. He featured in 15 matches and scored three goals during his time with the club.

He moved to Coras for the Apertura 2016, where an increased role allowed him to make a greater impact in front of goal. Martínez made 17 appearances and scored eight times, finishing the tournament as the club's leading scorer.

After a brief spell with Guadalajara, Martínez joined Mineros de Zacatecas, where he re-established himself as a prolific attacking presence. He enjoyed his most productive campaign to that point in the Clausura 2018, finishing the tournament as the division's top scorer with 11 goals.

Further spells with Cafetaleros de Chiapas and Celaya followed, allowing Martínez to continue developing as a consistent goal-scoring threat in Mexico's second tier.

=== Return to Liga MX ===
Martínez returned to the top flight ahead of the Clausura 2021, joining Puebla. His performances with the club earned him his first call-up to the Mexico national team.

In December 2023, his move to Pumas was officially confirmed. He made an immediate impact, scoring seven goals in his first tournament with the club and establishing himself as an important option in the attack.

In September 2026, Martínez took the next step in his career by joining Tigres UANL.

== International career ==
Martínez made his debut for the senior national team on 16 December 2023, in a friendly match against Colombia and scored a goal in a 2–3 defeat.

Martínez was named in the 26-man squad for the 2026 FIFA World Cup, hosted on home soil.

== Career statistics ==
=== International ===
As of match played on 5 July 2026

Appearances and goals by national team and year
National team	Year	Apps	Goals
Mexico	2023	1	1
Mexico	2024	7	1
Mexico	2025	0	0
Mexico	2026	6	1
Total		14	3

==== International goals ====
Scores and results list Mexico's goal tally first.

No.	Date	Venue	Opponent	Score	Result	Competition
1.	16 December 2023	Los Angeles Memorial Coliseum, Los Angeles, United States	Colombia	2–0	2–3	Friendly
2.	8 June 2024	Kyle Field, College Station, United States	Brazil	2–2	2–3	Friendly
3.	22 May 2026	Estadio Cuauhtémoc, Puebla, Mexico	Ghana	2–0	2–0	Friendly

== Honours ==
Guadalajara

- Liga MX: Clausura 2017
- Copa MX: Clausura 2017

Mexico U20

- CONCACAF U-20 Championship: 2015

Mexico

- CONCACAF Nations League: 2024–25

Individual

- Ascenso MX Golden Boot: Clausura 2018
- Liga de Expansión MX Golden Boot: Guardianes 2020 (Shared)
- Liga MX All-Star: 2024
- Liga MX Goalscorer of the Season: 2023–24
