= Luis Pereira (Panamanian footballer) =

Panamanian footballer (born 1996)

Personal information
- Full name: Luis Aurelio Pereira Lewis
- Date of birth: 27 March 1996 (age 30)
- Place of birth: Colón, Panama
- Height: 1.72 m (5 ft 7 1/2 in)
- Position: Midfielder

Team information
- Current team: Universitario

Youth career
- –2015: Árabe Unido

Senior career*
| Years | Team | Apps | (Gls) |
| 2015–2019 | Árabe Unido | 98 | (4) |
| 2017 | → Toronto FC II (loan) | 4 | (0) |
| 2019– | Universitario | 8 | (3) |

International career
| 2015 | Panama U20 | 8 | (0) |
| 2015 | Panama | 1 | (0) |
Medal record
Representing Panama
| Runner-up | CONCACAF U-20 Championship | 2015 |
- * Club domestic league appearances and goals as of 21:24, 18 September 2019 (UTC)

Luis Aurelio Pereira Lewis (born 27 March 1996) is a Panamanian professional footballer who plays for Universitario.

== Club career ==
Pereira joined Toronto FC II on loan from Panamanian side C.D. Árabe Unido in April 2017, having trained with the Canadian side in February of the same year. He made his debut in a 0–0 draw with the Richmond Kickers.

== Career statistics ==
=== Club ===
As of 10 May 2018.

| Club | Season | League | | | Cup | | Continental | | Other | | Total | |
| Club | Season | Division | Apps | Goals | Apps | Goals | Apps | Goals | Apps | Goals | Apps | Goals |
|---|---|---|---|---|---|---|---|---|---|---|---|---|
| Árabe Unido | 2014–15 | Liga Panameña de Fútbol | 10 | 0 | 0 | 0 | 0 | 0 | 0 | 0 | 10 | 0 |
| Árabe Unido | 2015–16 | Liga Panameña de Fútbol | 35 | 3 | 0 | 0 | 2 (Note: Appearances in the CONCACAF Champions League) | 0 | 0 | 0 | 37 | 3 |
| Árabe Unido | 2016–17 | Liga Panameña de Fútbol | 18 | 0 | 0 | 0 | 3 | 0 | 0 | 0 | 21 | 0 |
| Árabe Unido | Total | | 63 | 3 | 0 | 0 | 5 | 0 | 0 | 0 | 68 | 3 |
| Toronto FC II (loan) | 2017 | USL | 4 | 0 | 0 | 0 | – | | 0 | 0 | 4 | 0 |
| Career total | | | 67 | 3 | 0 | 0 | 5 | 0 | 0 | 0 | 71 | 3 |

=== International ===
As of match played 31 May 2017.

| National team | Year | Apps | Goals |
|---|---|---|---|
| Panama | 2015 | 1 | 0 |
| Panama | 2016 | 0 | 0 |
| Panama | 2017 | 0 | 0 |
| Total | | 1 | 0 |
