= Andy Ruiz (footballer) =

Guatemalan footballer

Personal information
- Full name: José Andrés Ruiz Rumph
- Date of birth: 30 May 1996 (age 30)
- Place of birth: Guatemala City, Guatemala
- Height: 1.70 m (5 ft 7 in)
- Position: Midfielder

Team information
- Current team: Marquense

Youth career
- FC Dallas

Senior career*
Years	Team	Apps	(Gls)
2016–2017	Elversberg II	21	(0)
2017–2018	Viktoria Köln II	4	(0)
2018–2019	Comunicaciones	1	(0)
2019–2020	Antigua	10	(0)
2020–2021	Cobán Imperial	44	(2)
2021–2023	Municipal	45	(1)
2023–2024	Guastatoya	28	(0)
2024–2025	Xinabajul	18	(2)
2025	Guastatoya	20	(0)
2025–	Marquense	0	(0)

International career
2012–2013	Guatemala U17	2	(0)
2015	Guatemala U20	6	(1)
2021	Guatemala	3	(0)
- * Club domestic league appearances and goals as of 20:00, 12 July 2021 (UTC)

José Andrés Ruiz Rumph (born 30 May 1996), commonly known as Andy Ruiz, is a Guatemalan professional footballer who plays as a midfielder for Liga Nacional club Marquense.

== Club career ==
A product of FC Dallas' youth academy, Ruiz began his senior career with the reserve sides of Elversberg and Viktoria Köln in Germany. He returned to Guatemala with stints at Comunicaciones and Antigua, before signing with Cobán Imperial on 16 June 2020.

== International career ==
Ruiz debuted with the Guatemala national team in a 0–0 friendly tie with El Salvador on 27 June 2021. He was called up to represent Guatemala at the 2021 CONCACAF Gold Cup, but had to withdraw after the first game as he contracted COVID-19.
