= Jesús Pérez (footballer, born 1995) =

Trinidad and Tobago footballer

Personal information
- Date of birth: 11 September 1995 (age 31)
- Place of birth: Arima, Trinidad and Tobago
- Height: 1.85 m (6 ft 1 in)
- Position: Left back

Team information
- Current team: Istiqlol
- Number: 6

Senior career*
Years	Team	Apps	(Gls)
2014–2016	North East Stars		
2016–2018	W Connection		
2017	→ San Juan Jabloteh (loan)		
2018–2020	Morvant Caledonia		
2020–	Istiqlol		

International career^{‡}
2015	Trinidad and Tobago U20	4	(0)
2015	Trinidad and Tobago U23	3	(0)
2017–	Trinidad and Tobago	1	(0)
Medal record
W Connection
Runner-up	TT Pro League	2016–17
San Juan Jabloteh
Runner-up	Caribbean Club Championship	2017
- * Club domestic league appearances and goals as of 11:00, 18 July 2018 (UTC) ‡ National team caps and goals as of 11:00, 18 July 2018 (UTC)

Jesús Pérez (born September 11, 1995) is a Trinidadian footballer who plays for Istiqlol.

== International career ==
Pérez made his international debut in a 2–0 win over Barbados in March 2017, coming on as a substitute for Daneil Cyrus.

== Career statistics ==
=== International ===
As of matches played 11 April 2020.

National team	Year	Apps	Goals
Trinidad and Tobago	2017	1	0
Total		1	0
