= Edson Samms =

Panamanian footballer (born 1995)

Personal information
- Full name: Edson De Sousa Samms Record
- Date of birth: 27 March 1995 (age 31)
- Place of birth: Bocas Town, Panama
- Height: 1.70 m (5 ft 7 in)
- Position: Winger

Senior career*
Years	Team	Apps	(Gls)
2014–2016	San Francisco	18	(1)
2016–2017	Árabe Unido	9	(0)
2017–2018	Atlético Veragüense	21	(4)
2018–2019	San Francisco	34	(10)
2019–2021	Costa del Este	46	(10)
2020	→ Deportivo Lara (loan)	5	(1)

International career^{‡}
2011	Panama U17	2	(0)
2015	Panama U20	9	(2)
2019–	Panama	1	(0)
- * Club domestic league appearances and goals as of 11 October 2020 ‡ National team caps and goals as of 11 October 2020

Edson De Sousa Samms Record (born 27 March 1995) is a Panamanian professional footballer who plays as winger.

== Playing career ==
Samms made his professional debut with Deportivo Lara in a 0-0 Venezuelan Primera División tie with Trujillanos F.C. on 7 February 2020.

== International career ==
Samms made his debut for the Panama national team in a 3-0 friendly loss to the United States on 29 January 2019.
