= Jackson Farmer =

Canadian soccer player (born 1995)

Personal information
- Full name: Jackson Farmer
- Date of birth: May 3, 1995 (age 31)
- Place of birth: Edmonton, Alberta, Canada
- Height: 1.88 m (6 ft 2 in)
- Position: Defender

Youth career
- 2004–2009: Xtreme FC
- 2009–2010: Edmonton Juventus
- 2010–2011: Xtreme FC
- 2011–2014: Whitecaps FC Residency

College career
Years	Team	Apps	(Gls)
2019–2020	UBC Thunderbirds	20	(14)

Senior career*
Years	Team	Apps	(Gls)
2014	Vancouver Whitecaps FC U-23	6	(0)
2014	→ Charleston Battery (loan)	4	(0)
2015–2016	Whitecaps FC 2	34	(0)
2018	Calgary Foothills FC	8	(0)

International career^{‡}
2015	Canada U20	2	(1)
2015	Canada U23	5	(0)
2013	Canada	1	(0)
- * Club domestic league appearances and goals as of July 14, 2018 ‡ National team caps and goals as of October 10, 2013

Jackson Farmer (born May 3, 1995) is a Canadian soccer player who plays as a defender. He is a full international for Canada.

== Club career ==
Farmer began his career began his career with Edmonton Xtreme FC where he played from 2004 to 2009. He then spent time with Edmonton Juventus where he played from 2009 to 2010 before returning to Xtreme FC where he played from 2010 to 2011 before eventually joining the Whitecaps Residency program.

On March 7, 2014, it was announced that Farmer was loaned to the Charleston Battery of the USL Pro, the third tier of the United States soccer league system, as part of the affiliation between the two clubs. Farmer made his professional club debut on March 22, 2014 against Orlando City SC as a late substitute for Taylor Mueller.

Farmer was signed to Vancouver's USL side, Whitecaps FC 2, on February 17, 2015. In December 2016, Whitecaps FC 2 announced that Farmer would not return to the club for the 2017 season.

Farmer would sign with Calgary Foothills for the 2018 PDL season.

He spent the 2019–20 year studying and playing college soccer at University of British Columbia.

In the 2021 CPL-U Sports Draft, he was selected sixteenth overall by FC Edmonton.

== International career ==
On August 27, 2013, Farmer received his first call up to the Canada national team by new manager Benito Floro for two friendlies against Mauritania on September 8 and 10. He made his debut in the first friendly, coming on as an 86th minute sub for Doneil Henry. The match ended in a goalless draw. After his debut with the senior side, Farmer was included on the U20 roster that went to 2014 Milk Cup.

=== International career statistics ===
As of match played 1 March 2014.

Canada national team
Year	Apps	Goals
2013	1	0
Total	1	0
