= David Ramírez (footballer, born 1995) =

Mexican footballer

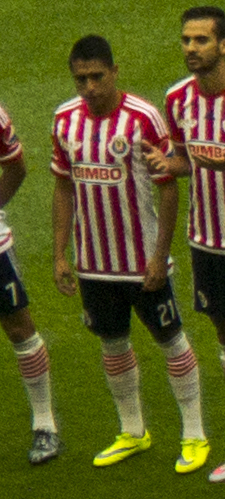
- Ramírez with Guadalajara in 2015

Personal information
- Full name: José David Ramírez García
- Date of birth: 14 December 1995 (age 30)
- Place of birth: León, Guanajuato, Mexico
- Height: 1.78 m (5 ft 10 in)
- Position: Right-back

Team information
- Current team: León
- Number: 28

Youth career
- Guadalajara

Senior career*
Years	Team	Apps	(Gls)
2014–2016	Guadalajara	38	(1)
2016–2017	Pachuca	3	(1)
2017	→ Celaya (loan)	10	(0)
2017–2018	→ UAT (loan)	31	(4)
2018–2020	Zacatecas	48	(3)
2020–	León	149	(2)

International career^{‡}
2015	Mexico U20	12	(4)
2021	Mexico	1	(0)
- * Club domestic league appearances and goals as of 5 September 2026 ‡ National team caps and goals as of 28 October 2021

José David Ramírez García (born 14 December 1995), also known as El Avión (The Airplane), is a Mexican professional footballer who plays as a right-back for Liga MX club León.

== Club career ==
=== Guadalajara ===
Ramírez made his professional debut on 20 February 2014 in the Copa MX against Estudiantes Tecos. He scored his first official league goal on 30 August 2015 at home against Chiapas.

== International career ==
=== Youth ===
Ramírez won the CONCACAF U-20 Championship with Mexico in 2015. Ramírez participated in the 2015 FIFA U-20 World Cup in New Zealand.

=== Senior ===
On 27 October 2021, Ramírez made his senior national team debut under Gerardo Martino in a friendly match against Ecuador.

== Career statistics ==
=== Club ===
As of 5 September 2026

Club	Season	League			Cup		Continental		Global		Other		Total	
Club	Season	Division	Apps	Goals	Apps	Goals	Apps	Goals	Apps	Goals	Apps	Goals	Apps	Goals
Guadalajara	2013–14	Liga MX	10	0	3	0	—		—		—		13	0
Guadalajara	2014–15	Liga MX	8	0	7	0	—		—		—		15	0
Guadalajara	2015–16	Liga MX	20	1	8	0	—		—		—		28	1
Guadalajara	Total		38	1	18	0	—		—		—		56	1
Pachuca (loan)	2016–17	Liga MX	3	1	—		2 (Note: Appearances in CONCACAF Champions League)	0	—		—		5	1
Celaya (loan)	2016–17	Ascenso MX	10	0	2	0	—		—		—		12	0
UAT (loan)	2017–18	Ascenso MX	31	4	—		—		—		—		31	4
Zacatecas	2018–19	Ascenso MX	25	1	1	0	—		—		—		26	1
Zacatecas	2019–20	Ascenso MX	23	2	—		—		—		—		23	2
Zacatecas	Total		48	3	1	0	—		—		—		49	3
León	2020–21	Liga MX	37	2	1 (Note: Appearance in Campeón de Campeones)	0	2	0	—		—		40	2
León	2021–22	Liga MX	35	0	—		4	0	—		3 (Note: Appearances in Leagues Cup)	0	42	0
León	2022–23	Liga MX	2	0	—		—		—		—		2	0
León	2023–24	Liga MX	29	0	—		—		1 (Note: Appearance in FIFA Club World Cup)	0	2	0	32	0
León	2024–25	Liga MX	27	0	—		—		—		1	0	28	0
León	2025–26	Liga MX	19	0	—		—		—		2	0	21	0
León	Total		149	2	1	0	6	0	1	0	8	0	165	2
Career total			279	11	22	0	8	0	1	0	8	0	318	11

=== International ===
As of match played on 28 October 2021

National team	Year	Apps	Goals
Mexico	2021	1	0
Total		1	0

== Honours ==
Guadalajara

- Copa MX: Apertura 2015

León

- Liga MX: Guardianes 2020
- Leagues Cup: 2021
- CONCACAF Champions League: 2023

Mexico U20

- CONCACAF U-20 Championship: 2015
