= Carlos Estrada (footballer, born 1997) =

Guatemalan footballer

Personal information
- Full name: Carlos Salvador Pablo Renato Estrada Santos
- Date of birth: 12 September 1997 (age 29)
- Place of birth: San Pablo, Guatemala
- Height: 1.81 m (5 ft 11 in)
- Position: Defender

Team information
- Current team: Municipal
- Number: 13

Youth career
- Malacateco

Senior career*
Years	Team	Apps	(Gls)
2012–2016	Malacateco	64	(4)
2016–2019	Comunicaciones	38	(3)
2020	Cobán Imperial	4	(0)
2020–2021	Cremas B		
2021–2022	Xelajú	30	(1)
2022	Al-Karkh		

International career
2021–	Guatemala	1	(0)
- * Club domestic league appearances and goals

Carlos Salvador Pablo Renato Estrada Santos (born 12 September 1997), commonly known as Chava, is a Guatemalan professional footballer who plays as a defender for Liga Guate club Municipal.

== Club career ==
=== Malacateco ===
Estrada started his career with Guatemalan side Malacateco.

=== Comunicaciones ===
In 2016, he signed for Comunicaciones in the Guatemalan top flight.

=== Al-Karkh ===
In 2022, Estrada signed for Iraqi club Al-Karkh.

== International career ==
On 28 May 2019, Estrada was called up to the Guatemala U23 team for the 2019 Toulon Tournament.
