= Kadeem Corbin =

Trinidad and Tobago footballer

Personal information
- Full name: Kadeem Corbin
- Date of birth: 4 March 1996 (age 30)
- Place of birth: Diego Martin, Trinidad and Tobago
- Height: 1.75 m (5 ft 9 in)
- Position: Forward

Team information
- Current team: La Horquetta Rangers

Senior career*
Years	Team	Apps	(Gls)
2013–2016	St. Ann's Rangers		(2)
2016–2017	Central		(4)
2017	San Juan Jabloteh		(0)
2018	W Connection		(6)
2019–	La Horquetta Rangers		(5)

International career^{‡}
2015	Trinidad and Tobago U20	4	(2)
2015–	Trinidad and Tobago	5	(1)
- * Club domestic league appearances and goals as of 15 July 2020 ‡ National team caps and goals as of 2 July 2023

Kadeem Corbin (4 March 1996) is a Trinbagonian footballer who plays as a forward for La Horquetta Rangers.

He made his international debut versus Curaçao in June 2015.
