= Swiss Salvadorans =

Swiss Salvadoran Schweizer Salvadorianer
- (Switzerland) (El Salvador)

Total population
- 500+ (2009)

Regions with significant populations
- San Salvador, Santa Tecla, Usulután Department, San Miguel

Languages
- Salvadoran Spanish, German, French

Religion
- Christianity (Protestantism and Roman Catholic)

Related ethnic groups
- Swiss people

Swiss Salvadorans are Salvadoran citizens with Swiss ancestry. There are currently 506 Swiss citizens residing in El Salvador. In El Salvador there are many people with Swiss ancestry.

== Immigration ==
When El Salvador became independent, it was not an attractive destination for Swiss but when the country introduced and made a transition to coffee, many Swiss came to the country. In the 1870s, a Swiss colony was created in El Salvador. In 1880, due to liberal laws that encouraged immigration and the handing over of land for coffee cultivation, many Swiss came to the country seeing these opportunities. In the following years, Switzerland signed agreements with El Salvador; for a commercial coalition, mainly the export of coffee, this attracted many more Swiss. The Swiss settled mainly in places of coffee plantations such as the municipalities of Santiago de María, Berlín, and Alegría, but cities that received the most were San Miguel, San Salvador, and Santa Tecla. The majority of Swiss that arrived to El Salvador originated from the canton of St. Gallen, with a few others coming from Bern and Jura.

== Bilateral relations Switzerland–El Salvador ==
In 1883, Switzerland and El Salvador signed a friendship and commercial coalition agreement, years later, in 1913 the federal government appointed the first honorary consul in San Salvador. In 1920, the consulate moved to San Miguel, where some Swiss had settled as coffee growers. In 1948, the position was transferred to the capital San Salvador. In 1959, it was promoted to consulate general and in 1968 to embassy. The latter became involved in the civil war between the left-wing guerrilla and the army in the late 1970s, The assassination of Hugo Wey, Chargé d'Affaires in San Salvador, led to the closure of the embassy in 1979, until in 1982 the federal government reopened a representation in the form of a consular agency (since 1997 honorary consulate general). With the end of the civil war in 1992, bilateral relations improved. Switzerland intensified its development policy. In 1996 both states signed an investment protection agreement.

In trade agreements, the main products that El Salvador exported to Switzerland were coffee and chocolate, and Switzerland exported products such as cheese and watches to El Salvador.

== Swiss surnames found in El Salvador ==
Aeschbacker, Anliker, Arnold, Barem, Bolens, Bolliat, Burkard, Casati, Dürler, Egli, Escher, Euchner, Fickewirth, Forrer, Haltmayer, Heinzelmann, Hemmeler, Herger, Hirlemann, Homberger, Hugentobler, Iseli, Kurz, Langenegger, Langner, Merz, Oberholzer, Roshardt, Rutz, Salomon (Jewish origin), Sickhard, Scheidegger, Schildknecht, Schlageter, Schürmann, Spranger, Stoffel, Sutter, Trachsler, Weiser, Wuntz, Zimmermann, Zoller, etc.

== Notable Salvadorans of Swiss descent ==
- Federico Anliker Lopez, president (2020–Present) of CEPA
- Pablo Anliker Infante, exminister of Agriculture (2019-2021)
- Marvin Baumgartner, Member of El Salvador's 2013 FIFA U-20 World Cup squad
- María Eugenia Brizuela de Ávila, exminister of Foreign Affairs (1999-2004)
- Alfredo Cristiani Burkard, President of El Salvador 1989-1994
- Anita Cristina Escher Echeverría, diplomat
- Emil Forrer, archaeologist
- Guillermo Hemmeler (Wilhelm Hemmeler) (1869-1940), Swiss Consul in El Salvador and Former Bank Manager of Banco Nacional del Salvador in the XX Century
- Ariane Langner, banker
- Miguel Merz, Professional tennis player

== See also ==
- Salvadorans
- Swiss people
- Swiss Chileans
