= El Salvador national under-20 football team =

El Salvador Under 20
- Nickname: La Azulita
- Association: Federación Salvadoreña de Fútbol
- Confederation: CONCACAF (North America)
- Head coach: (El Salvador) Erick Dowson Prado
- FIFA code: SLV
First colours	Second colours

First international
- Curaçao 1–19 El Salvador (Panama City, Panama; March 6, 1962)

Biggest win
- El Salvador 16–0 Nicaragua (Guatemala City, Guatemala; August 17, 1982)

Biggest defeat
- Mexico 12–0 El Salvador (Havana, Cuba; September 29, 1970) Records for competitive matches only.

The El Salvador Under 20s football team, is commonly known as La Azulita. La Azulita is controlled by Federación Salvadoreña de Fútbol(FESFUT) and represents El Salvador in all international Under 20 competitions.

Their first U-20 World Cup was at the 2013 FIFA U-20 World Cup, where they saw their first victory at a major FIFA tournament (outside of beach soccer) to Australia by 2–1, scored respectively by Diego Coca and José Peña.

== CONCACAF Championship ==
=== 2024 CONCACAF Championship ===
On April 11, 2024, CONCACAF had their official draw. El Salvador was placed in Group B alongside, Honduras, Dominican Republic, and Canada. All games will be played in Estadio Sergio León Chávez in Irapuato, Mexico starting July 20, 2024.

Pos	Team	Pld	W	D	L	GF	GA	GD	Pts	Qualification
1	Honduras	3	2	1	0	11	5	+6	7	Advance to knockout stage
2	Canada	3	2	1	0	5	3	+2	7	Advance to knockout stage
3	El Salvador	3	1	0	2	3	6	−3	3	
4	Dominican Republic	3	0	0	3	2	7	−5	0	

Source: CONCACAF
Rules for classification: tiebreakers

El Salvador's U-20 national team participated in the 2024 Concacaf U-20 Championship, held in Irapuato, Mexico. They were drawn into Group B alongside Honduras, Canada, and the Dominican Republic. The team began their campaign with a 1-0 victory over the Dominican Republic, with Christopher Argueta scoring the lone goal in the 62nd minute. Goalkeeper Daniel Franco played a crucial role, making several important saves including a penalty stop.

However, El Salvador's fortunes turned in their subsequent matches. They suffered a heavy 4-1 defeat against Honduras, despite initially taking the lead through Nelson Díaz. In their final group match, they lost 2-1 to Canada in a closely contested game. Francis Castillo scored El Salvador's goal, but a late bicycle kick by Bunbury secured Canada's win. El Salvador thought they had equalized in the final moments through Walter Menjívar, but the goal was disallowed after a VAR review. With one win and two losses, El Salvador finished third in Group B with three points and a goal difference, which was insufficient to advance to the knockout stages as one of the best third-placed teams.

July 20, 2024

Dominican Republic	0-1	El Salvador
	Report	Christopher Argueta 62'

Estadio Sergio León Chávez, Irapuato

July 23, 2024

El Salvador	1-4	Honduras
Nelson Díaz 40'	Report	Diego Guardado 45+1' (o.g.); Dereck Moncada 53'; Anfronit Tatúm 66', 84'

Estadio Sergio León Chávez, Irapuato

July 26, 2024

El Salvador	1-2	Canada
Francis Castillo 77'	Report	Santiago López 21'; Mataeo Bunbury 90+3'

Estadio Sergio León Chávez, Irapuato

=== 2024 Qualifiers ===
La Azulita qualified for the CONCACAF Under-20 Championship which is slated for the Summer of 2024. El Salvador U20 started the CONCACAF Qualifying on Friday, February 23, 2024, till Saturday, March 2, 2024, at ABFA Technical Center in Antigua and Barbuda. The Azulita finished first with 10 points. Suriname came in second with 9, Antigua and Barbuda with 6, Guyana with 4 and Turks and Caicos 0.

El Salvador belongs to Group B. Group B consist of the following Nations:

- Turks and Caicos Islands
- Guyana
- Suriname
- Antigua and Barbuda

After round-robin play between February 23 and March 2, 2024, the first-place team from each group will advance to the 2024 CONCACAF Men's U-20 Championship, joining the six pre-seeded top-ranked nations. Which include in order, United States, Honduras, Mexico, Panama, Costa Rica and the Dominican Republic.

February 23, 2024	El Salvador	7-0	Turks and Caicos Islands	Stadium in Piggotts, Antigua and Barbuda
09:30	Christopher Argueta 26' Daniel Espana 37'; Walter Menjívar 41'; Wilber Diaz 67'; Wilber Diaz 80'; Darwin Lopez 90+1' Nelson Díaz 90+3'	Report		Stadium: ABFA Technical Center, Antigua and Barbuda

February 25, 2024	Guyana	2-2	El Salvador	Stadium in Piggotts, Antigua and Barbuda
09:30	Nathaniel Pydana 10'; Nathaniel Pydana 83'	Report	22' Kiano Falcao; 62' Wilber Diaz	Stadium: ABFA Technical Center, Antigua and Barbuda

February 29, 2024	El Salvador	3-0	Suriname	Stadium in Piggotts, Antigua and Barbuda
14:00	Christopher Argueta 10' Nestor Delgado 24' Kiano Falcao 66'	Report		Stadium: ABFA Technical Center, Antigua and Barbuda

March 2, 2024	Antigua and Barbuda	0-1	El Salvador	Stadium in Piggotts, Antigua and Barbuda
14:00		Report	Christopher Guardado 57'	Stadium: ABFA Technical Center, Antigua and Barbuda

=== UNCAF 2024 ===
La Azulita, along with seven other selections, gathered in Tegucigalpa, Honduras, to participate in an international competition through the tournament UNCAF FIFA FORWARD. La Azulita was grouped in Group A with Honduras, Panamá, and Nicaragua.

January 19, 2024	Panama	3-0	El Salvador	Tegucigalpa, Honduras
11:10				Stadium: Sede C.D. Olimpia, Honduras

January 21, 2024	Honduras	4-2	El Salvador	Tegucigalpa, Honduras
15:10				Stadium: Sede C.D. Olimpia, Honduras

January 23, 2024	El Salvador	0-5	Nicaragua	Tegucigalpa, Honduras
15:10				Stadium: Sede C.D. Olimpia, Honduras

January 25, 2024	Cuba	3-3	El Salvador	Tegucigalpa, Honduras
10:30				Stadium: Sede C.D. Olimpia, Honduras
	Penalties
	3		4

=== 2024 current squad ===
On February 19, 2024, the Head Coach Juan Cortes named the following players to the CONCACAF Under-20 Qualifiers. The Qualifiers run from February 23, 2024, to March 2, 2024, in Antigua and Barbuda.

== History of La Azulita ==
=== FIFA U-20 World Cup record ===
Year	Round	GP	W	D*	L	GS	GA
(Tunisia) 1977	Did not qualify						
(Japan) 1979	Did not qualify						
(Australia) 1981	Did not qualify						
(Mexico) 1983	Did not qualify						
(Soviet Union) 1985	Did not qualify						
(Chile) 1987	Did not qualify						
(Saudi Arabia) 1989	Did not qualify						
(Portugal) 1991	Did not qualify						
(Australia) 1993	Did not qualify						
(Qatar) 1995	Did not qualify						
(Malaysia) 1997	Did not qualify						
(Nigeria) 1999	Did not qualify						
(Argentina) 2001	Did not qualify						
(United Arab Emirates) 2003	Did not qualify						
(Netherlands) 2005	Did not qualify						
(Canada) 2007	Did not qualify						
(Egypt) 2009	Did not qualify						
(Colombia) 2011	Did not qualify						
(Turkey) 2013	Group stage	3	1	0	2	2	7
(New Zealand) 2015	Did not qualify						
(South Korea) 2017	Did not qualify						
(Poland) 2019	Did not qualify						
(Indonesia) 2021	Cancelled						
(Argentina) 2023	Did not qualify						
(Chile) 2025	Did not qualify						
(Azerbaijan) (Uzbekistan) 2027	Did not qualify						
(Armenia) (Georgia (country)) 2029	To be determined						
Total	1/26	3	1	0	2	2	7

=== UNCAF preliminary round ===
Year	Position	GP	W	D*	L	GS	GA	
1995	1/2	2	2	0	0	8	1	qualified
1998	2/2	2	1	0	1	4	5	Did not qualify
(Panama) 2001	3/3	2	0	1	1	1	2	Did not qualify
2003	2/5	4	2	1	1	7	4	Qualified
2005	3/5	4	2	0	2	9	6	Did not qualify
2007	2/3	2	1	0	1	6	7	Did not qualify
(Honduras) / (Guatemala) 2009	1/4	3	2	0	1	6	3	Qualified
(Panama) / (Honduras) 2011	2/3 Play-off	4	2	1	1	8	6	Disqualified¹
(Honduras) / (Guatemala) 2013	1/3	2	1	0	1	4	4	Qualified
(El Salvador) 2015	2/6	6	3	2	1	18	6	Qualified
(Panama) 2017	2/6	4	2	1	1	9	4	Qualified
	9/9	25	13	3	9	53	38	

^{1}The games were forbidden by Concacaf due to El Salvador using an ineligible player

=== CONCACAF Under-20 Championship ===
Year	Round	GP	W	D*	L	GS	GA
(Panama) 1962	Round 1	3	0	2	1	2	3
(Guatemala) 1964	Champions	7	5	1	1	12	6
(Cuba) 1970	Fourth place	4	1	1	2	3	8
(Mexico) 1973	Did not participate						
(Canada) 1974	Did not participate						
(Puerto Rico) 1976	First round	3	0	1	2	2	9
(Honduras) 1978	Second round	6	3	1	2	11	7
(United States) 1980	Round 1	4	2	0	2	9	4
(Guatemala) 1982	Second round	5	2	0	3	13	7
(Trinidad and Tobago) 1984	Third place	8	4	3	1	10	3
(Trinidad and Tobago) 1986	did not participate						
(Guatemala) 1988	did not participate						
(Guatemala) 1990	Round 1	2	0	0	2	1	4
(Canada) 1992	Did not participate						
(Honduras) 1994	Fourth place	8	5	1	2	22	10
(Mexico) 1996	Round 1	3	0	1	2	3	6
(Guatemala) (Trinidad and Tobago) 1998	Did not qualify						
(Canada) (Trinidad and Tobago) 2001	Did not qualify						
(Panama) (United States) 2003	Round 1	3	0	0	3	1	5
(United States) (Honduras) 2005	Did not qualify						
(Panama) (Mexico) 2007	Did not qualify						
(Trinidad and Tobago) 2009	First round	3	0	1	2	3	6
(Guatemala) 2011	Disqualified						
(Mexico) 2013	Third place	5	3	0	2	6	6
(Jamaica) 2015	Playoff stage	6	2	2	2	9	10
(Costa Rica) 2017	Classification stage	5	2	0	3	7	11
(United States) 2018	Qualification stage	6	3	0	3	7	7
(United States) 2022	Round 16	4	2	1	1	13	7
(Mexico) 2024	Group stage	3	1	0	2	3	6
(Mexico) 2026	Group stage	3	0	0	3	1	8
Total	Champions	82	31	13	35	114	117

== Previous fixtures and results ==
Date:	Location:	Opponent:	Score*	Competition:	El Salvador scorers:
October 22, 2025	Estadio Cementos Progreso, Guatemala City, Guatemala	Guatemala	0-2	2025 Central American Games	Nil
October 24, 2025	Estadio Cementos Progreso, Guatemala City, Guatemala	Nicaragua	0-1	2025 Central American Games	Carlos Garay 25'
October 26, 2025	Estadio Cementos Progreso, Guatemala City, Guatemala	Panama	1-3	2025 Central American Games	Nelson Díaz 46'
October 28, 2025	Estadio Cementos Progreso, Guatemala City, Guatemala	Guatemala	2-4	2025 Central American Games	Christopher Guardado 19'; Nelson Díaz 83'
December 5, 2025	Yappy Park, Panama City, Panama	Costa Rica	2-4	2025 UNCAF U-19 Tournament	Wilber Díaz 15'; Uriel Miranda 26'
December 7, 2025	Yappy Park, Panama City, Panama	Guatemala	0-3	2025 UNCAF U-19 Tournament	Nil
December 9, 2025	Yappy Park, Panama City, Panama	Puerto Rico	2-2	2025 UNCAF U-19 Tournament	Jefferson Roque 4'; Johann Ortíz 83'
December 11, 2025	Yappy Park, Panama City, Panama	Cuba	3-5	2025 UNCAF U-19 Tournament	Gabriel Arnold 54', 81'; Uriel Miranda 56'
February 23, 2026	Estadio Miguel Chocorrón Buitrago, Managua, Nicaragua	French Guiana	3-0	2026 CONCACAF U-20 Championship qualifying	Johan Ortiz 11'; Luis Tobar 41' 64'
February 25, 2026	Estadio Miguel Chocorrón Buitrago, Managua, Nicaragua	Saint Martin	4-1	2026 CONCACAF U-20 Championship qualifying	Christian Coreas 12' (pen.); Diego Peña 75'; Wilber Díaz 82'; Gerson Robles 86'
February 27, 2026	Estadio Miguel Chocorrón Buitrago, Managua, Nicaragua	Grenada	2-0	2026 CONCACAF U-20 Championship qualifying	Hugo Aguilar 41'; Wilber Díaz 81'
March 1, 2026	Estadio Miguel Chocorrón Buitrago, Managua, Nicaragua	Belize	7-0	2026 CONCACAF U-20 Championship qualifying	Christian Coreas 9'; Darwin Saravia 39' (o.g.); Johann Ortiz 41', 60'; William Cabrera 77'; Jonathan Aguirre 88'; Gabriel Arnold 90+1'
March 3, 2026	Estadio Miguel Chocorrón Buitrago, Managua, Nicaragua	Suriname	0-2	2026 CONCACAF U-20 Championship qualifying	Nil

Key

- F = Friendly
- UF = Unofficial Friendly
- U-20 CCQ = 2026 CONCACAF U-20 Championship qualifying
- U-20 CC = U-20 Championship
- U-20 WC = U-20 World Cup
- GS = Group stage
- QF = Quarter-finals
- SF = Semi-finals
- Fi = Final
- PSO = Penalty shootout
- a.e.t. = After extra time
- El Salvador's scores listed first

== Players ==
=== Current squad ===
The following 21 players were called up for the 2026 CONCACAF U-20 Championship qualifying.

No.	Pos.	Player	Date of birth (age)	Caps	Goals	Club
27	GK	Parker Vasquez	April 10, 2008 (age 18)			(Salvadoran Football Federation) Alianza
18	GK	Máximo Sandoval	January 4, 2008 (age 18)			(Salvadoran Football Federation) Hércules
1	GK	Peter Cornejo	October 30, 2008 (age 17)			(United States Soccer Federation) Los Angeles Surf SC
12	DF	Matias Alas	March 14, 2005 (age 21)			(Salvadoran Football Federation) Alianza
5	DF	Hugo Aguilar	June 22, 2007 (age 19)			(Salvadoran Football Federation) Isidro Metapán
15	DF	Eric Velásquez	January 3, 2007 (age 19)			(United States Soccer Federation) New York Red Bulls
4	DF	Jonathan Aguirre	February 24, 2007 (age 19)			(United States Soccer Federation) North Carolina FC Academy
3	DF	Jonathan Polío	October 8, 2007 (age 18)			(United States Soccer Federation) Oakland Roots SC
2	DF	Jonathan López	January 3, 2007 (age 19)			(Salvadoran Football Federation) Isidro Metapán
16	DF	Óscar Delgado	April 18, 2007 (age 19)			(Salvadoran Football Federation) FAS
14	MF	Diego Peña	April 25, 2007 (age 19)			(Salvadoran Football Federation) Alianza
6	MF	Gerson Robles	March 2, 2008 (age 18)			(Salvadoran Football Federation) Municipal Limeño
8	MF	Johann Ortíz	January 1, 2007 (age 19)			(United States Soccer Federation) Sporting Kansas City II
10	MF	Gabriel Arnold	February 1, 2007 (age 19)			(United States Soccer Federation) Ventura County FC
13	MF	Jefferson Roque	June 22, 2007 (age 19)			(Salvadoran Football Federation) Platense
7	MF	Cristian Coreas	January 2, 2007 (age 19)			(United States Soccer Federation) University of San Diego
17	MF	William Bonilla	September 5, 2008 (age 18)			(United States Soccer Federation) North Carolina FC
11	MF	Uriel Miranda	March 13, 2007 (age 19)			(Salvadoran Football Federation) Isidro Metapán
9	FW	Luis Tobar	April 20, 2008 (age 18)			(Salvadoran Football Federation) Alianza
20	FW	Wilber Díaz	May 16, 2007 (age 19)			(Salvadoran Football Federation) Zacatecoluca FC
19	FW	Brandon Ramírez	September 5, 2008 (age 18)			(Salvadoran Football Federation) Juventud Independiente

=== Recent call-ups ===
The following players have been called up within the last 12 months.

Pos.	Player	Date of birth (age)	Caps	Goals	Club	Latest call-up
GK	Cristian Bonilla	February 11, 2004 (age 22)	4	0	(El Salvador) Cacahuatique	2025 Central American Games^{PRE}
GK	Daniel Franco	February 11, 2004 (age 22)	4	0	(El Salvador) Alianza	2025 Central American Games
GK	Hamilton Lemus	July 8, 2004 (age 22)	0	0	(El Salvador) Isidro Metapan	2025 Central American Games
GK	Edwin Polanco	July 31, 2007 (age 19)			(El Salvador) FAS	November 2025 Training Camp
DF	William Molina	May 21, 2004 (age 22)	6	0	(El Salvador) Municipal Limeno	2025 Central American Games
DF	David Montejo	October 17, 2003 (age 22)	0	0	(El Salvador) FAS	2025 Central American Games
DF	Néstor Somoza	October 17, 2003 (age 22)	0	0	(El Salvador) Hércules	2025 Central American Games
DF	Kiano Falcao	April 10, 2006 (age 20)	0	0	(Colombia) Atlético Huila	2025 Central American Games
DF	Emir Ponciano	February 22, 2007 (age 19)	0	0	(United States) Los Angeles FC	2025 Central American Games
DF	Bryan Lovo	November 23, 2004 (age 21)	7	0	(El Salvador) Aguila	2025 Central American Games
DF	Kevin García	September 5, 2007 (age 19)			(El Salvador) Alianza	November 2025 Training Camp
DF	Anderson Martinez	October 17, 2003 (age 22)			(El Salvador) FAS	November 2025 Training Camp
DF	Elmer Rodriguez	September 2, 2007 (age 19)			(El Salvador) LA Firpo	November 2025 Training Camp
DF	Jose Guatemala	October 17, 2003 (age 22)			(El Salvador) Aguila	November 2025 Training Camp
MF	Johann Ortiz	January 1, 2007 (age 19)	0	0	(United States) Sporting Kansas City II	2025 Central American Games
MF	Gabriel Pereira	May 7, 2005 (age 21)	0	0	(Brazil) Azuriz FC	2025 Central American Games
MF	Christopher Guardado	November 23, 2004 (age 21)	7	0	(El Salvador) Alianza	2025 Central American Games
MF	Gabriel Arnold	February 1, 2007 (age 19)	0	0	(United States) LA Galaxy	2025 Central American Games
MF	Jefferson Martinez	November 29, 2006 (age 19)	0	0	(El Salvador) Municipal Limeno	2025 Central American Games
MF	Narciso Ramírez	February 9, 2005 (age 21)	0	0	(United States) Houston FC	2025 Central American Games^{PRE}
MF	Michael Umaña	November 23, 2004 (age 21)	7	0	(Mexico) Club Necaxa Reserves and Academy	2025 Central American Games^{PRE}
MF	Mauricio Zabala	November 29, 2006 (age 19)			(El Salvador) Isidro Metapan	November 2025 Training Camp
MF	Edwin Velasquez	November 29, 2006 (age 19)			(El Salvador) Hércules	November 2025 Training Camp
MF	Jefferson Roque	November 29, 2006 (age 19)			(El Salvador) Platense	November 2025 Training Camp
MF	Luis Ramirez	February 6, 2007 (age 19)			(El Salvador) Alianza	November 2025 Training Camp
MF	Jason Ayala	November 29, 2006 (age 19)			(El Salvador) Municipal Limeno	November 2025 Training Camp
FW	Rene Garay	December 30, 2003 (age 22)	0	0	(El Salvador) Aguila	2025 Central American Games
FW	Melvin Urbina	December 30, 2003 (age 22)	0	0	(El Salvador) Hércules	2025 Central American Games
FW	Nelson Díaz	December 30, 2003 (age 22)	0	0	(El Salvador) LA Firpo	2025 Central American Games
FW	Inner Guevara	March 16, 2005 (age 21)	0	0	(El Salvador) Inter FA	2025 Central American Games
FW	Francis Castillo	November 7, 2005 (age 20)	0	0	(Spain) CA Antoniano	2025 Central American Games
FW	Christopher Argueta	January 14, 2007 (age 19)	0	0	(Slovakia) MFK Dukla U-19	2025 Central American Games
FW	Marvin Benítez	December 30, 2003 (age 22)	0	0	(El Salvador) Aguila	2025 Central American Games^{PRE}
FW	Ricardo Villatoro	December 30, 2003 (age 22)	0	0	(El Salvador) Aguila	2025 Central American Games^{PRE}
FW	Steven Guerra	December 30, 2003 (age 22)	0	0	(El Salvador) Isidro Metapan	2025 Central American Games^{PRE}
FW	Paolo Herrera	December 30, 2003 (age 22)			(El Salvador) Hércules	November 2025 Training Camp
FW	Brandon Ramírez	September 5, 2008 (age 18)			(El Salvador) Juventud Independiente	November 2025 Training Camp
^{INJ} Player withdrew from the current squad due to injury.^{COV} Player withdrew due to testing positively for COVID-19 or having to self-isolate because of it.^{PRE} Preliminary squad.^{RET} Player had announced retirement from international football.^{SUS} Player is serving a suspension.^{WD} Withdrawn.

== Formers players ==
=== 2013 FIFA U-20 World Cup squad ===
Head coach: Mauricio Alfaro (El Salvador)

No.	Pos.	Player	Date of birth (age)	Caps	Goals	Club
1	GK	Rolando Morales	March 1, 1994 (aged 19)			(Salvadoran Football Federation) Turín-FESA
2	DF	Oliver Ayala	January 4, 1994 (aged 19)			(Mexican Football Federation) León
3	MF	Tomás Granitto	June 12, 1993 (aged 20)			(United States Soccer Federation) Florida Gulf Coast University
4	DF	Giovanni Zavaleta	September 27, 1994 (aged 18)			(Salvadoran Football Federation) Turín-FESA
5	MF	Romilio Hernández	June 6, 1995 (aged 18)			(United States Soccer Federation) Baltimore Bays
6	DF	Marvin Baumgartner	January 13, 1993 (aged 20)			(Swiss Football Association) Zürich
7	MF	Jairo Henríquez	August 31, 1993 (aged 19)			(Salvadoran Football Federation) Turín-FESA
8	MF	José Villavicencio	January 24, 1995 (aged 18)			(Salvadoran Football Federation) Turín-FESA
9	FW	José Peña	December 10, 1994 (aged 18)			(Salvadoran Football Federation) Turín-FESA
10	MF	Diego Coca	August 26, 1994 (aged 18)			(Salvadoran Football Federation) Turín-FESA
11	FW	Maikon Orellana	November 12, 1993 (aged 19)			(Danish Football Association) Brøndby
12	DF	Kevin Barahona	October 1, 1994 (aged 18)			(Salvadoran Football Federation) Turín-FESA
13	DF	Miguel Lemus	October 26, 1993 (aged 19)			(Salvadoran Football Federation) Turín-FESA
14	MF	Óscar Rodríguez	April 16, 1995 (aged 18)			(Salvadoran Football Federation) Atlético San José
15	MF	René Gómez	January 8, 1993 (aged 20)			(Salvadoran Football Federation) Turín-FESA
16	MF	Benjamín Díaz	May 8, 1993 (aged 20)			(United States Soccer Federation) University of the District of Columbia
17	DF	Kevin Ayala	July 15, 1994 (aged 18)			(Salvadoran Football Federation) Turín-FESA
18	GK	Adolfo Menéndez, Jr.	July 3, 1993 (aged 19)			(Salvadoran Football Federation) FAS
19	MF	Bernardo Majano	December 9, 1995 (aged 17)			(United States Soccer Federation) D.C. United
20	FW	Roberto González	March 25, 1993 (aged 20)			(Salvadoran Football Federation) Santa Tecla
21	GK	Carlos Cañas	September 9, 1994 (aged 18)			(United States Soccer Federation) Longwood University

== Personnel ==
=== Current staff ===
As of November 2025

Head coach	(Colombia) Eduardo Lara
Assistant coach	(Colombia) Helmer Silva
Assistant coach	(El Salvador) Ernesto de la Ocomo
Goalkeeper Coach	(El Salvador) Adolfo Menéndez
Physical Trainer	(Colombia) Mauricio Roldán
Medical Trainer
Kinesiologist
Equipment Manager	(El Salvador) Abraham Beltrán

== Manager history ==
- (El Salvador) Conrado Miranda (1964, 1979)
- (El Salvador) Raul Magana (1985,1994)
- (El Salvador) Carlos Recinos (2000–2001)
- (El Salvador) Ricardo Herrera (2002–2003)
- (El Salvador) Cesar Acevedo (2004–2005)
- (El Salvador) José Luis Rugamas (2006–2007)
- (El Salvador) Norberto Huezo (2008–2009)
- (El Salvador) Mauricio Alfaro (2009–2015)
- (Colombia) Eduardo Lara (2016–2017)
- (El Salvador) Alexsander Rodriguez (2017–2018)
- (El Salvador) Ernesto Gochez (2018–2020)
- (El Salvador) Gerson Perez (2021–2022)
- (Spain) Manuel Torres Núñez (2023)
- (Spain) Juan Cortez (2024)
- (El Salvador) Erick Dowson Prado (2025-2026)
- (Colombia) Eduardo Lara (2026-Present)

== Honours ==
- CONCACAF U-20 Championship
  - Winners (1): 1964
  - Third place (2): 1984, 2013

== See also ==
- El Salvador national football team
- El Salvador national under-17 football team
- El Salvador national under-21 football team
- El Salvador national under-23 football team
- CONCACAF Under-20 Championship
