= 2005 CONCACAF U-20 Tournament qualifying =

This article features the 2005 CONCACAF U-20 Tournament qualifying stage. Caribbean and Central American teams entered in separate tournaments. The North American teams Canada and Mexico automatically qualified, as well as main tournament hosts Honduras (Central America) and the United States (North America). Nineteen Caribbean teams entered, of which two qualified and five Central American teams entered, of which two qualified.

== Caribbean ==
=== Preliminary round ===
| Team 1 | Agg. | Team 2 | 1st leg | 2nd leg |
|---|---|---|---|---|
| Suriname | 3–4 | Aruba | 3–2 | 0–2 |
| Saint Martin | 5–4 | U.S. Virgin Islands | 2–1 | 3–3 |
| Dominica | 1–3 | Saint Kitts and Nevis | 0–1 | 1–2 |

=== Group stage ===
==== Group A ====
All matches were played in Trinidad and Tobago.

| Teams | Pld | W | D | L | GF | GA | GD | Pts |
|---|---|---|---|---|---|---|---|---|
| Trinidad and Tobago | 3 | 2 | 1 | 0 | 7 | 3 | +4 | 7 |
| Grenada | 3 | 1 | 1 | 1 | 2 | 2 | 0 | 4 |
| Barbados | 3 | 1 | 0 | 2 | 5 | 7 | –2 | 3 |
| Guyana | 3 | 1 | 0 | 2 | 3 | 5 | –2 | 3 |

| Barbados | 1–0 | Grenada |
| Trinidad and Tobago | 2–0 | Guyana |
| Guyana | 3–2 | Barbados |
| Grenada | 1–1 | Trinidad and Tobago |
| Guyana | 0–1 | Grenada |
| Trinidad and Tobago | 4–2 | Barbados |

==== Group B ====
All matches were played in Jamaica.

| Teams | Pld | W | D | L | GF | GA | GD | Pts |
|---|---|---|---|---|---|---|---|---|
| Jamaica | 3 | 3 | 0 | 0 | 17 | 0 | +17 | 9 |
| Saint Lucia | 3 | 2 | 0 | 1 | 6 | 3 | +3 | 6 |
| Bermuda | 3 | 1 | 0 | 2 | 2 | 6 | –4 | 3 |
| Antigua and Barbuda | 3 | 0 | 0 | 3 | 2 | 18 | –16 | 0 |

| Bermuda | 0–2 | Saint Lucia |
| Jamaica | 12–0 | Antigua and Barbuda |
| Antigua and Barbuda | 1–2 | Bermuda |
| Saint Lucia | 0–2 | Jamaica |
| Saint Lucia | 4–1 | Antigua and Barbuda |
| Jamaica | 3–0 | Bermuda |

==== Group C ====
All matches were played in the Netherlands Antilles.

| Teams | Pld | W | D | L | GF | GA | GD | Pts |
|---|---|---|---|---|---|---|---|---|
| Haiti | 3 | 3 | 0 | 0 | 11 | 0 | +11 | 9 |
| Netherlands Antilles | 3 | 1 | 1 | 1 | 2 | 5 | –3 | 4 |
| Saint Vincent and the Grenadines | 3 | 1 | 0 | 2 | 2 | 6 | –4 | 3 |
| Aruba | 3 | 0 | 1 | 2 | 1 | 5 | –4 | 1 |

| Haiti | 3–0 | Aruba |
| Netherlands Antilles | 2–0 | Saint Vincent and the Grenadines |
| Saint Vincent and the Grenadines | 0–3 | Haiti |
| Aruba | 0–0 | Netherlands Antilles |
| Saint Vincent and the Grenadines | 2–1 | Aruba |
| Netherlands Antilles | 0–5 | Haiti |

==== Group D ====
All matches were played in Cuba. Saint Martin withdrew.

| Teams | Pld | W | D | L | GF | GA | GD | Pts |
|---|---|---|---|---|---|---|---|---|
| Cuba | 2 | 2 | 0 | 0 | 10 | 2 | +8 | 6 |
| Dominican Republic | 2 | 0 | 1 | 1 | 5 | 9 | –4 | 1 |
| Saint Kitts and Nevis | 2 | 0 | 1 | 1 | 3 | 7 | –4 | 1 |

| Cuba | 4–0 | Saint Kitts and Nevis |
| Saint Kitts and Nevis | 3–3 | Dominican Republic |
| Dominican Republic | 2–6 | Cuba |

=== Final round ===
In this round, Haiti withdrew after one match. The second match was awarded to Jamaica 3–0.

| Team 1 | Agg. | Team 2 | 1st leg | 2nd leg |
|---|---|---|---|---|
| Trinidad and Tobago | 6–5 | Cuba | 3–2 | 3–3 |
| Jamaica | 7–0 | Haiti | 4–0 | (3–0) |

== Central America ==
Belize withdrew in this group.

| Teams | Pld | W | D | L | GF | GA | GD | Pts |
|---|---|---|---|---|---|---|---|---|
| Costa Rica | 4 | 3 | 1 | 0 | 9 | 2 | +7 | 10 |
| Panama | 4 | 3 | 1 | 0 | 6 | 1 | +5 | 10 |
| El Salvador | 4 | 2 | 0 | 2 | 9 | 6 | +3 | 6 |
| Guatemala | 4 | 1 | 0 | 3 | 6 | 13 | –7 | 3 |
| Nicaragua | 4 | 0 | 0 | 4 | 3 | 11 | –8 | 0 |

| Costa Rica | 2–0 | Nicaragua |
| Guatemala | 2–5 | El Salvador |
| Panama | 1–0 | Guatemala |
| Costa Rica | 1–0 | El Salvador |
| El Salvador | 0–2 | Panama |
| Nicaragua | 2–3 | Guatemala |
| Costa Rica | 5–1 | Guatemala |
| Panama | 2–0 | Nicaragua |
| El Salvador | 4–1 | Nicaragua |
| Costa Rica | 1–1 | Panama |

== Qualified for Main Tournament ==
- Jamaica (Caribbean winners)
- Trinidad and Tobago (Caribbean winners)
- Costa Rica (Central American winners)
- Panama (Central American runners-up)

== See also ==
- 2005 CONCACAF U-20 Tournament
