= 2003 CONCACAF U-20 Tournament qualifying =

This article features the 2003 CONCACAF U-20 Tournament qualifying stage. Caribbean and Central American teams entered in separate tournaments. The North American teams Canada and Mexico automatically qualified, as well as main tournament hosts Panama (Central America) and the United States (North America). Eighteen Caribbean teams entered, of which two qualified and five Central American teams entered, of which two qualified.

== Caribbean ==
=== Preliminary round ===
Saint Lucia received a bye because Anguilla withdrew.

Team 1	Agg.	Team 2	1st leg	2nd leg
Aruba	0–3	Netherlands Antilles	0–0	0–3
Suriname	4–0	Guyana	4–0	0–0
U.S. Virgin Islands	0–12	Saint Kitts and Nevis	0–8	0–4
Dominican Republic	2–3	Haiti	1–1	1–2

=== Group stage ===
==== Group A ====
All matches were played in Suriname.

Teams	Pld	W	D	L	GF	GA	GD	Pts
Trinidad and Tobago	3	2	0	1	6	2	+4	6
Suriname	3	2	0	1	4	5	–1	6
Barbados	3	1	0	2	4	4	0	3
Netherlands Antilles	3	1	0	2	4	7	–3	3

Trinidad and Tobago	1–0	Barbados
Suriname	2–1	Netherlands Antilles
Trinidad and Tobago	1–2	Netherlands Antilles
Barbados	0–2	Suriname
Trinidad and Tobago	4–0	Suriname
Barbados	4–1	Netherlands Antilles

==== Group B ====
Montserrat withdrew in this group.

Teams	Pld	W	D	L	GF	GA	GD	Pts
Jamaica	2	2	0	0	9	2	+7	6
Cayman Islands	2	1	0	1	2	3	–1	3
Puerto Rico	2	0	0	2	1	7	–6	0

Cayman Islands	1–0	Puerto Rico
Jamaica	6–1	Puerto Rico
Cayman Islands	1–3	Jamaica

==== Group C ====
All matches were played in Saint Kitts and Nevis. Antigua and Barbuda were disqualified, they were supposed to be group host but were too late informing that their field was unavailable for play.

Teams	Pld	W	D	L	GF	GA	GD	Pts
Haiti	2	2	0	0	13	1	+12	6
Saint Kitts and Nevis	2	1	0	1	7	5	+2	3
Bahamas	2	0	0	2	1	15	–14	0

Saint Kitts and Nevis	7–0	Bahamas
Haiti	8–1	Bahamas
Saint Kitts and Nevis	0–5	Haiti

==== Group D ====
Teams	Pld	W	D	L	GF	GA	GD	Pts
Cuba	3	3	0	0	13	2	+11	9
Dominica	3	2	0	1	4	4	0	6
Grenada	3	1	0	2	3	4	–1	3
Saint Lucia	3	0	0	3	2	12	–10	0

Saint Lucia	0–3	Grenada
Cuba	3–1	Dominica
Saint Lucia	1–2	Dominica
Cuba	3–0	Grenada
Saint Lucia	1–7	Cuba
Dominica	1–0	Grenada

=== Final round ===
Team 1	Agg.	Team 2	1st leg	2nd leg
Trinidad and Tobago	1–3	Cuba	0–0	1–3
Jamaica	1–2	Haiti	1–2	0–0

== Central America ==
Teams	Pld	W	D	L	GF	GA	GD	Pts
Guatemala	4	2	2	0	5	2	+3	8
El Salvador	4	2	1	1	7	4	+3	7
Honduras	4	2	0	2	10	5	+5	6
Costa Rica	4	2	0	2	7	3	+4	6
Nicaragua	4	0	1	3	3	18	–15	1

Guatemala	1–0	Costa Rica
El Salvador	2–1	Honduras
Guatemala	0–0	El Salvador
Honduras	6–0	Nicaragua
El Salvador	5–2	Nicaragua
Honduras	2–0	Costa Rica
Guatemala	3–1	Honduras
Nicaragua	0–6	Costa Rica
Guatemala	1–1	Nicaragua
El Salvador	0–1	Costa Rica

== Qualified for Main Tournament ==
- Cuba (Caribbean winners)
- Haiti (Caribbean winners)
- Guatemala (Central American winners)
- El Salvador (Central American runners-up)

== See also ==
- 2003 CONCACAF U-20 Tournament
