= Dustin Corea =

Footballer (born 1992)

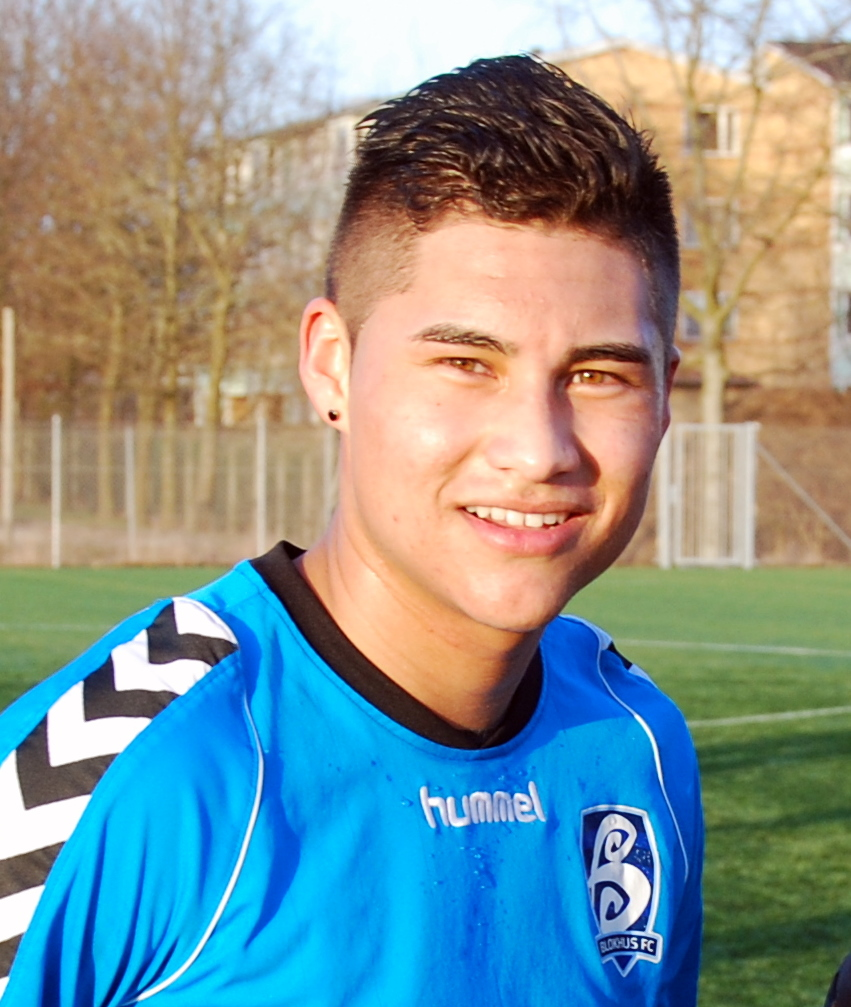
- Corea in 2012

Personal information
- Full name: Dustin Clifman Corea Garay
- Date of birth: March 21, 1992 (age 34)
- Place of birth: Portland, Oregon, United States
- Height: 1.75 m (5 ft 9 in)
- Positions: Winger; forward

Team information
- Current team: Charlotte Independence
- Number: 21

Youth career
- 2007–2009: Eastside United FC

Senior career*
Years	Team	Apps	(Gls)
2011	Atlético Marte		
2011–2012	Blokhus	19	(2)
2012	Jönköpings Södra	4	(2)
2013–2014	Skive	11	(2)
2015	FAS	20	(5)
2015–2017	FC Edmonton	62	(7)
2018	Miami FC	0	(0)
2018–2019	FAS	42	(16)
2019–2020	Deportivo Mixco	14	(6)
2020	Xelaju	4	(0)
2021	FAS	38	(5)
2022–2023	Águila	38	(14)
2023	FAS	22	(5)
2024	Águila	20	(2)
2024	Charlotte Independence	10	(1)
2025	Real Estelí FC	19	(2)
2025-Present	FAS		

International career^{‡}
2008–2009	United States U17	27	(15)
2010	El Salvador U20	4	(3)
2012	El Salvador U23	2	(0)
2013–	El Salvador	24	(1)
- * Club domestic league appearances and goals as of 18:40, 21 November 2024 (UTC) ‡ National team caps and goals as of 16:52, 13 March 2024 (UTC)

Dustin Clifman Corea Garay (born March 21, 1992) is a professional footballer who plays as a winger for USL League One club FAS. Born in the United States, he represents El Salvador at international level.

== High school ==
Dustin Corea attended Milwaukie High School, which he graduated in 2010. He was rewarded the "Oregon 6A State Player of the Year" award in 2009, the first player in at least 22 years to win the award without making a state playoff appearance. He was also rewarded the "Three Rivers League Player of the Year" award in the same year. Between 2007 and 2009, Corea was included in the league's Best XI. In his three-year high school soccer career, Corea scored 46 goals with 21 assists in 43 matches played. In 2006, he scored 6 goals with 7 assists in 15 matches. In 2007, Corea scored 14 goals with 7 assists in 14 matches for a school record for goals in one season. In 2009, Corea scored 26 goals with 7 assists in 14 matches for another school record for goals in one season.

== Club career ==
Corea was invited to trial with several teams in 2010: Juventus, Fiorentina, Palermo, Club Brugge. Nothing came of these trials and he decided to try his luck in his father's native country of El Salvador.

On July 13, 2011, Corea signed with Atlético Marte of El Salvador for six months.

Corea played 25 minutes in a friendly game with Atlético Marte. A few days later it was announced that he would incorporate into Blokhus FC from Denmark. Corea was granted permission to leave Marte as a clause in his contract stated that if a European club were to become interested in Corea, he would be allowed to leave if desired.

On January 29, 2013, Corea signed a six-month loan deal with Danish team Skive IK. On March 13 he signed a 2 1/2-year contract with Skive IK, beginning at the end of the loan deal binding him to Skive IK til the end of 2015. On September 2, 2014 Corea's contract with Skive IK was cancelled by mutual consent.

On January 4, 2015 Corea signed a one-year contract with Salvadoran Champions CD FAS.

On July 30, 2015, Corea signed with NASL club FC Edmonton. Corea would spend three seasons in Edmonton. After the 2017 season, with the future of FC Edmonton and the NASL in doubt, Corea was released from FC Edmonton.

== International career ==
=== United States ===
The Oregon native took part at the 2009 CONCACAF U-17 Championship, in which the United States U-17 qualified to the 2009 FIFA U-17 World Cup. He was not chosen to participate in the U-17 World Cup competition.

=== El Salvador ===
The "Ghost", as he is popularly known, gained notoriety with his goals against Costa Rica at the 2011 CONCACAF U-20 Championship qualifying, which in turn, by an administrative error on the part of the Salvadoran Football Association, left the El Salvador U-20 out of the 2010 CONCACAF U-20 Championship that was held in Guatemala. Corea played for the U.S. U-17, for which the FESFUT must have sent a letter to FIFA in request for an association change, which was not done. Therefore, El Salvador was disallowed for continuation.

After the disqualification it was unclear whether or not the "Ghost" could play for El Salvador in any competition. FESFUT had sent a letter to the FIFA for permission on Corea's behalf. It was until July 1, 2011 that the Fédération Internationale de Football Association (FIFA) sent the notice of the decision of the "sole judge of the Players' Status Committee," on changing the player's association. The decision was approved of the change and, therefore, Corea can represent El Salvador.

On March 11, 2013 Dustin Corea was called up for the El Salvador national squad and got his debut as he started in and played for the first 56 minutes at a friendly against Ecuador on March 21 – on his 21st birthday.

== Career statistics ==
Scores and results list El Salvador's goal tally first.

#	Date	Venue	Opponent	Score	Result	Competition
1.	11 July 2015	BBVA Compass Stadium, Houston, United States	Costa Rica	1–1	1–1	2015 CONCACAF Gold Cup
