= 2005 CONCACAF U-20 Tournament =

2005 CONCACAF U-20 Qualification

Tournament details
- Host countries: United States; Honduras
- Dates: January 12–30
- Teams: 8 (from 1 confederation)
- Venue: 2 (in 2 host cities)

Tournament statistics
- Matches played: 12
- Goals scored: 34 (2.83 per match)
- Attendance: 52,552 (4,379 per match)
- Top scorer: (Canada) Ryan Gyaki (4 goals)
- All statistics correct as of March 26, 2009.

The 2005 CONCACAF U-20 Qualifying Tournament was held to determine the four CONCACAF entrants into the 2005 FIFA World Youth Championship, which was hosted by the Netherlands. The tournament final was held in two groups of four with the top two from each group advancing. Group A was held in United States and Group B was held in Honduras. On January 16, 2005, the United States and Panama qualified to the U-20 World Cup. On January 30, 2005, Canada and Honduras achieved qualification.

== Teams ==
The following teams qualified for the tournament:

Region	Qualification	Qualifiers
Caribbean (CFU)	Caribbean qualifying	Jamaica; Trinidad and Tobago
Central America (UNCAF)	Central American qualifying	Costa Rica; Panama
Central America (UNCAF)	host	Honduras
North America (NAFU)	host	United States
North America (NAFU)	automatically qualified	Canada; Mexico

== Venues ==
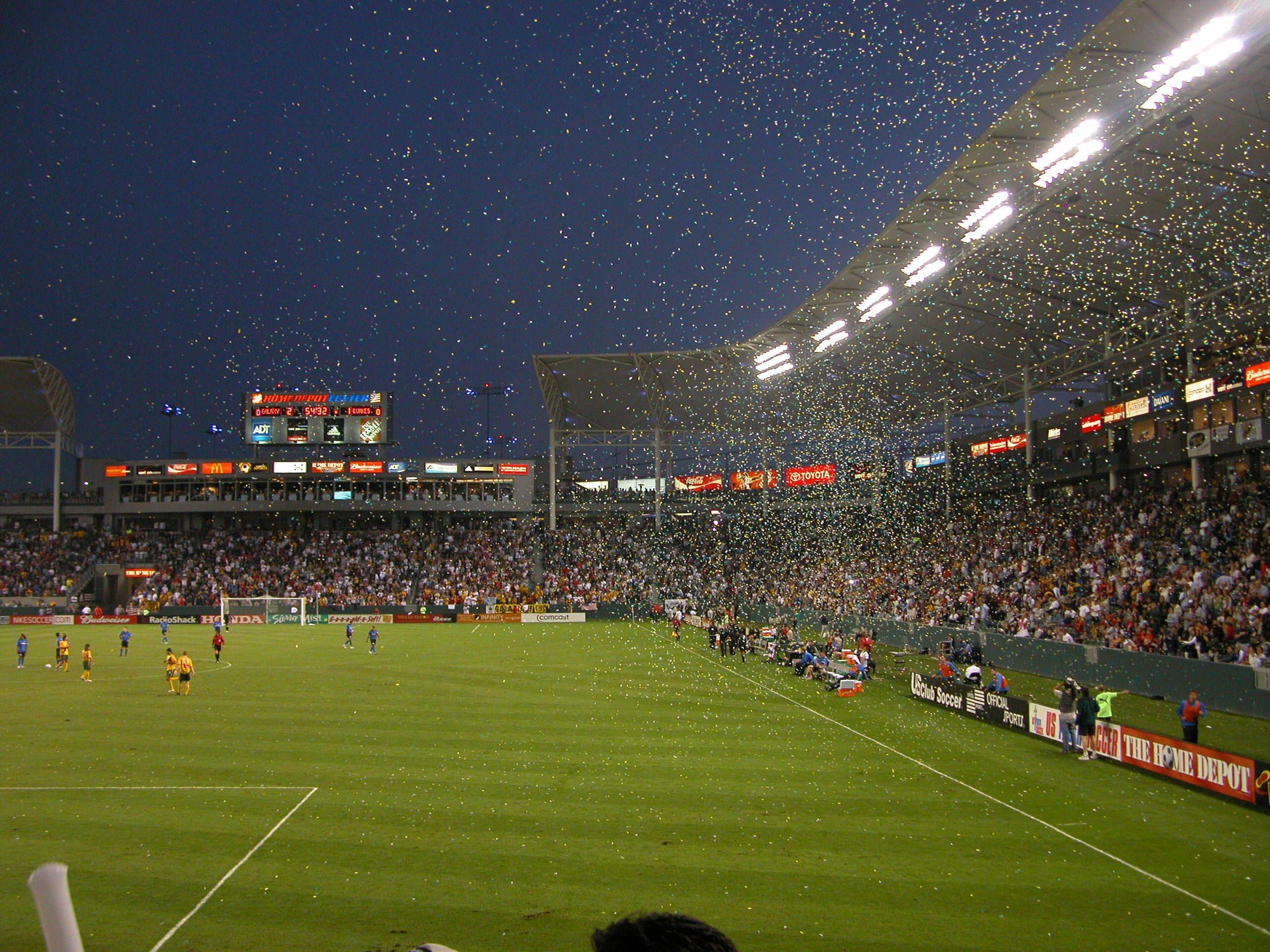
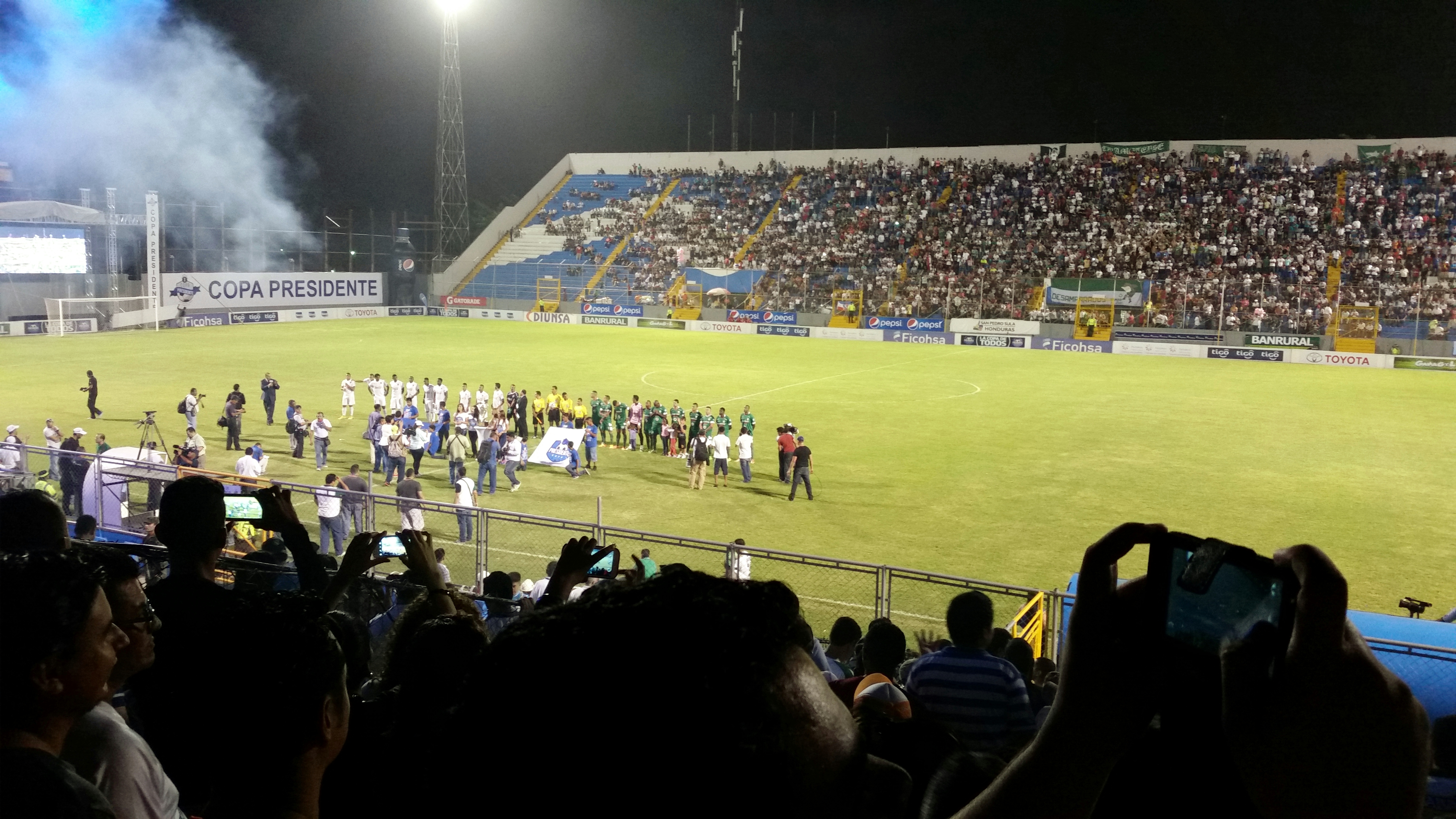
Carson	San Pedro Sula
The Home Depot Center	Estadio Francisco Morazán
Capacity: 27,000	Capacity: 20,000

== Group A ==
United States hosted Group A. All of the matches were played at the Home Depot Center in Carson, California between January 12–16.

Team	Played	Win	Draw	Lose	GF	GA	GD	Pts
United States	3	3	0	0	10	1	+9	9
Panama	3	1	1	1	4	4	0	4
Costa Rica	3	1	1	1	3	4	−1	4
Trinidad and Tobago	3	0	0	3	3	11	−8	0

12 January 2005

Costa Rica	1–1	Panama
Cordero 54'	Report	Gun 76'

Home Depot Center, Carson, California
Attendance: 500
12 January 2005

United States	6–1	Trinidad and Tobago
Gaven 1' 9' 25'; Adu 7' (pen.); 16' (o.g.); John 53'	Report	Crooks 23'

Home Depot Center, Carson, California
Attendance: 1718

14 January 2005

Trinidad and Tobago	1–2	Costa Rica
Jagdeosingh 85'	Report	Chacon 8'; Salazar 62'

Home Depot Center, Carson, California
Attendance: 2149
14 January 2005

Panama	0–2	United States
	Report	Adu 55' (pen.); Peterson 88'

Home Depot Center, Carson, California
Attendance: 2149

16 January 2005

Panama	3–1	Trinidad and Tobago
Gallardo 12'; Salazar 71' 75'	Report	Francois 77'

Home Depot Center, Carson, California
Attendance: 2705
16 January 2005

Costa Rica	0–2	United States
	Report	Barrett 2'; Szetela 37'

Home Depot Center, Carson, California
Attendance: 2705

== Group B ==
Honduras hosted Group B. All of the matches were played at Estadio Francisco Morazán in San Pedro Sula between January 26–30.

Team	Pld	W	D	L	GF	GA	GD	Pts
Canada	3	3	0	0	4	1	+3	9
Honduras	3	2	0	1	6	3	+3	6
Mexico	3	1	0	2	2	4	−2	3
Jamaica	3	0	0	3	2	6	−4	0

26 January 2005

Mexico	1–2	Canada
Parra 15'	Report	Gyaki 27' 39'

Estadio Francisco Morazán, San Pedro Sula
Attendance: 6002
26 January 2005

Honduras	4–2	Jamaica
Güity 23' 41'; Núñez 45' (pen.) 72'	Report	Priestley 55'; White 69'

Estadio Francisco Morazán, San Pedro Sula
Attendance: 6002

28 January 2005

Mexico	1–0	Jamaica
Hernandez 23'	Report

Estadio Francisco Morazán, San Pedro Sula
Attendance: 8242
28 January 2005

Canada	1–0	Honduras
Gyaki 61'	Report

Estadio Francisco Morazán, San Pedro Sula
Attendance: 8242

30 January 2005

Canada	1–0	Jamaica
Gyaki 74'	Report

Estadio Francisco Morazán, San Pedro Sula
Attendance: 6069
30 January 2005

Mexico	0–2	Honduras
	Report	Nolasco 77'; Güity 88'

Estadio Francisco Morazán, San Pedro Sula
Attendance: 6069

== Goal scorers ==
4 goals

- (Canada) Ryan Gyaki

3 goals

- (Honduras) José Güity
- (United States) Eddie Gaven

2 goals

- (Honduras) Ramón Núñez
- (Panama) Alvaro Salazar
- (United States) Freddy Adu

1 goal

- (Costa Rica) Jose Luis Cordero
- (Costa Rica) Franklin Chacón
- (Costa Rica) Alonso Salazar
- (Honduras) Angel Nolazco
- (Jamaica) Akeem Priestley
- (Jamaica) O'Brian White

1 goal cont.

- (Mexico) Marco Parra
- (Mexico) Luis Omar Hernandez
- (Panama) Armando Gun
- (Panama) Luis Gallardo
- (Trinidad and Tobago) Kevin Crooks
- (Trinidad and Tobago) Kendall Jagdeosingh
- (Trinidad and Tobago) Marcelle Francois
- (United States) Chad Barrett
- (United States) Danny Szetela
- (United States) Jacob Peterson
- (United States) Will John

== See also ==
- 2005 CONCACAF U-20 Tournament qualifying
- CONCACAF Under-20 Championship
- 2005 FIFA World Youth Championship
