= 1998 CONCACAF U-20 Tournament qualifying =

This article features the 1998 CONCACAF U-20 Tournament qualifying stage. Caribbean and Central American teams entered in separate tournaments. The North American teams Canada, Mexico and the United States automatically qualified, as well as main tournament hosts Guatemala (Central America) and Trinidad and Tobago (Caribbean). Twelve Caribbean teams entered, of which one qualified and four Central American teams entered, of which two qualified.

== Caribbean ==
=== First round ===
The scores between the Netherlands Antilles and Dominica are unknown, but the Netherlands Antilles won.

Team 1	Agg.	Team 2	1st leg	2nd leg
Anguilla	0–12	Grenada	0–7	0–5
Barbados	3–1	Saint Vincent and the Grenadines	1–1	2–0
Cayman Islands	0–1	Bermuda	0–0	0–1
Netherlands Antilles	unknown	Dominica		

=== Second round ===
Guyana, Jamaica and Puerto Rico entered the tournament in this round. Aruba, Haiti and Suriname were supposed to as well, but they did not.

Team 1	Agg.	Team 2	1st leg	2nd leg
Guyana	3–1	Netherlands Antilles	2–0	1–1
Grenada	6–2	Puerto Rico	4–1	2–1

Teams	Pld	W	D	L	GF	GA	GD	Pts
Jamaica	2	2	0	0	12	2	+10	6
Barbados	2	1	0	1	7	7	0	3
Bermuda	2	0	0	2	1	11	–10	0

Jamaica	6–2	Barbados
Barbados	5–1	Bermuda
Jamaica	6–0	Bermuda

=== Final Round ===
Antigua and Barbuda entered the tournament this round. Group winners Jamaica qualified for the main tournament.

Teams	Pld	W	D	L	GF	GA	GD	Pts
Jamaica	3	3	0	0	21	1	+20	9
Grenada	3	2	0	1	4	6	–2	6
Guyana	3	1	0	2	3	9	–6	3
Antigua and Barbuda	3	0	0	3	1	13	–12	0

Jamaica	6–1	Grenada
Antigua and Barbuda	1–3	Guyana
Jamaica	6–0	Guyana
Antigua and Barbuda	0–1	Grenada
Antigua and Barbuda	0–9	Jamaica
Grenada	2–0	Guyana

== Central America ==
=== First round ===
Honduras received a bye because Nicaragua withdrew.

Team 1	Agg.	Team 2	1st leg	2nd leg
El Salvador	4–5	Panama	3–2	1–3

=== Second round ===
Costa Rica qualified directly for the main tournament because Belize withdrew. Honduras also qualified by beating Panama.

Team 1	Agg.	Team 2	1st leg	2nd leg
Honduras	3–2	Panama	2–1	1–1

== Qualified for Main Tournament ==
- Costa Rica (Central American winner, but without playing)
- Honduras (Central American winner)
- Jamaica (Caribbean winner)

== See also ==
- 1998 CONCACAF U-20 Tournament
