= 2011 CONCACAF U-20 Championship qualifying =

Four teams (including the host Guatemala) from Central America and five from the Caribbean qualified to the 2011 CONCACAF U-20 Championship to be played in Guatemala. Canada, Mexico, and United States automatically qualified.

== Caribbean zone ==
=== Qualifying Playoff ===
8 September 2010

Turks and Caicos Islands	0–0	U.S. Virgin Islands

TCIFA National Academy, Providenciales, Turks and Caicos Islands
Attendance: 75
Referee: Kenville Holder (CAY)

14 September 2010

U.S. Virgin Islands	3–0	Turks and Caicos Islands
Pierre 16'; Smith 43', 64'

Paul E. Joseph Stadium, Frederiksted
Attendance: 100
- U.S. Virgin Islands advance 3–0 on aggregate.

=== Group stage ===
All four group winners qualified for the 2011 CONCACAF U-20 Championship in Guatemala April 3–17, with the group runners-up advancing to a second group phase that determined the Caribbean's fifth and final entrant in the 12-team confederation finals.

==== Group A ====
Team	Pld	W	D	L	GF	GA	GD	Pts	Qualification
Cuba	3	3	0	0	32	0	+32	9	2011 CONCACAF U-20 Championship
Netherlands Antilles	3	1	1	1	21	3	+18	4	CFU second round qualifying
Saint Kitts and Nevis	3	1	1	1	20	2	+18	4	Eliminated
British Virgin Islands	3	0	0	3	0	68	−68	0	Eliminated

7 November 2010

Cuba	1–0	Saint Kitts and Nevis
Lahera 70'

Kralendijk Stadion, Kralendijk, Netherlands Antilles
Attendance: 250

7 November 2010

Netherlands Antilles	20–0	British Virgin Islands
Trenidad 1', 29', 33', 39', 71'; Roosje 16', 26', 75', 81'; Santiroma 17', 22', 50', 55', 79'; Calvenhoven 34'; Frans 58', 61', 86'; Martha 60', 69'

Kralendijk Stadion, Kralendijk, Netherlands Antilles
Attendance: 250

9 November 2010

British Virgin Islands	0–29	Cuba
		Beltran 2', 11', 32', 35', 76', 84', 89', 90'; Lizama 4', 7', 13'; Diaz 5', 17', 80'; Norford 10' (o.g.); Jefferson 16' (o.g.); Chang 19', 26', 28', 42'; Martinez 29', 31'; Macias 37', 63'; Pena 58', 82'; Corrales 75'; Brockbank 86' (o.g.); Cantero 88'

Kralendijk Stadion, Kralendijk, Netherlands Antilles
Attendance: 150

9 November 2010

Netherlands Antilles	1–1	Saint Kitts and Nevis
Martha 81'		Henry 7'

Kralendijk Stadion, Kralendijk, Netherlands Antilles

11 November 2010

Saint Kitts and Nevis	19–0	British Virgin Islands
Adams 7', 46'; Blanchette 11', 12', 51'; Elliott 14' (pen.), 21', 28', 40', 75', 80'; Liburd 22', 44'; Harris 48'; Henry 62', 72', 90'; Pringle 69', 81'

Kralendijk Stadion, Kralendijk, Netherlands Antilles
Attendance: 150

11 November 2010

Netherlands Antilles	0–2	Cuba
		Lahera 3', 54'

Kralendijk Stadion, Kralendijk, Netherlands Antilles
Attendance: 150

==== Group B ====
Team	Pld	W	D	L	GF	GA	GD	Pts	Qualification
Guadeloupe	2	1	1	0	5	1	+4	4	2011 CONCACAF U-20 Championship
Bermuda	2	1	1	0	3	1	+2	4	CFU second round qualifying
Antigua and Barbuda	2	0	0	2	0	6	−6	0	Eliminated

Haiti withdrew from Caribbean qualifying for the CONCACAF Under-20 Championship, reducing Group B to three teams.

20 October 2010

Guadeloupe	1–1	Bermuda
Pascal 21'		Leverock 29'

Stade René Serge Nabajoth, Les Abymes, Guadeloupe
Referee: Kevin Thomas (Jamaica)

22 October 2010

Bermuda	2–0	Antigua and Barbuda
Lambe 67'; Tucker 82'

Stade René Serge Nabajoth, Les Abymes, Guadeloupe
Attendance: 95
Referee: Caswell Cambridge (Saint Vincent and the Grenadines)

24 October 2010

Guadeloupe	4–0	Antigua and Barbuda
Grava 38', 64'; Roche 53'; Rambojean 73'

Stade René Serge Nabajoth, Les Abymes, Guadeloupe
Attendance: 360

==== Group C ====
Team	Pld	W	D	L	GF	GA	GD	Pts	Qualification
Jamaica	3	3	0	0	21	1	+20	9	2011 CONCACAF U-20 Championship
Guyana	3	2	0	1	8	3	+5	6	CFU second round qualifying
Grenada	3	1	0	2	8	9	−1	3	Eliminated
U.S. Virgin Islands	3	0	0	3	1	25	−24	0	Eliminated

6 October 2010

Jamaica	6–1	Grenada
Foster 1', 40', 75'; Brett 45', 77'; Ottey 61'	Report	Samuel 32'

Providence Stadium, Providence, Guyana
Attendance: 275
Referee: Neal Brizan (Trinidad and Tobago)

6 October 2010

Guyana	5–1	U.S. Virgin Islands
Nelson 14' (pen.); McKinnon 24'; Alleyne 52'; Holder 84'; Beaton 90'	Report	Taylor 35' (pen.)

Providence Stadium, Providence, Guyana
Attendance: 275
Referee: Enrico Wijngaarde (Suriname)

8 October 2010

U.S. Virgin Islands	0–13	Jamaica
	Report	Foster 5', 65', 83'; Brett 8'; Ottey 19', 30'; Wilson 35', 90+1'; Williams 63', 64', 78'; Farquharson 77'; Roye 88'

Providence Stadium, Providence, Guyana
Attendance: 485
Referee: Mark Young (Guyana)

8 October 2010

Guyana	3–0	Grenada
Holder 26'; Joseph 40'; Nelson 74' (pen.)	Report

Providence Stadium, Providence, Guyana
Attendance: 2000
Referee: Trevor Taylor (Barbados)

10 October 2010

Grenada	7–0	U.S. Virgin Islands
Phillip 26', 38', 83', 90'; Ganness 48', 59'; Jones 68'	Report

Providence Stadium, Providence, Guyana
Attendance: 2000
Referee: Trevor Taylor (Barbados)

10 October 2010

Guyana	0–2	Jamaica
	Report	Foster 18', 26'

Providence Stadium, Providence, Guyana
Attendance: 2000
Referee: Enrico Wijngaarde (Suriname)

==== Group D ====
Because a host country could not be found for Group D, Trinidad played St. Vincent & the Grenadines, and Aruba played Suriname in two two-leg series with the winners facing off to determine the group winner.

Semifinals
Suriname	3	4	7
Aruba	1	1	2
Saint Vincent and the Grenadines	0	1	1
Trinidad and Tobago	8	4	12

Finals
Trinidad and Tobago	2	2	4
Suriname	1	1	2

13 November 2010

Suriname	3–1	Aruba
Pinas 4'; Apai 75'; Le Roy 83' (o.g.)	Report	Kock 25'

Stade René Serge Nabajoth, Guadeloupe
Attendance: 225
Referee: Ignatius Baptiste (Dominica)

20 November 2010

Aruba	1–4	Suriname
Kock 8'	Report	Rijssel 24', 77'; Misidjan 39'; Avianko 44'

Attendance: 400
Referee: Javier Jauregui (Netherlands Antilles)

18 November 2010

Saint Vincent and the Grenadines	0–8	Trinidad and Tobago
	Report	Brito 21', 69'; Bateau 32'; Joseph 40'; Peltier 43'; Patrick 51'; Winchester 56', 65'

Victoria Park, St. Vincent and the Grenadines
Attendance: 800
Referee: Ignatius Baptiste (Dominica)

24 November 2010

Trinidad and Tobago	4–1	Saint Vincent and the Grenadines
Peltier 7'; Winchester 72'; Frederick 90'; Brito 90'		Rouse 90'

10 December 2010
5:00 pm

Suriname	1–2	Trinidad and Tobago
Pinas 11'		Joseph 45'; Bateau 59'

André-Kamperveen-Stadion, Suriname

20 December 2010
3:00 pm

Trinidad and Tobago	2–1	Suriname
Peltier 58'; Bateau 60'		Afianko's 24'

Marvin Lee Stadium, Trinidad and Tobago

Trinidad and Tobago qualified to the CONCACAF U-20 Championship.

== CFU second round qualifying ==
One team qualified to the CONCACAF U-20 Championship.

=== Second phase ===
Team	Pld	W	D	L	GF	GA	GD	Pts
Suriname	3	3	0	0	6	3	+3	9
Bermuda	3	1	0	2	5	4	+1	3
Netherlands Antilles	3	1	0	2	4	5	−1	3
Guyana	3	1	0	2	3	6	−3	3

On December 28, it was announced that Suriname would host the group.

19 January 2011

Bermuda	3–0	Guyana
Leverock 9'; Albouy 64'; Tucker 69'

André Kamperveen Stadion, Paramaribo, Suriname

19 January 2011

Suriname	2–1	Netherlands Antilles
Rijssel 54', 61'		Monte 68'

André Kamperveen Stadion, Paramaribo, Suriname

21 January 2011

Netherlands Antilles	2–1	Bermuda
Anastatia 31'; Ryadh Monte 90'		Tucker 54'

André Kamperveen Stadion, Paramaribo, Suriname

21 January 2011

Suriname	2–1	Guyana
Rijssel 45' (pen.); Plet 74'		Holder 31'

André Kamperveen Stadion, Paramaribo, Suriname

23 January 2011

Guyana	2–1	Netherlands Antilles
Holder 70'; Bobb 81'		Hooi 64'

André Kamperveen Stadion, Paramaribo, Suriname

23 January 2011

Suriname	2–1	Bermuda
Rijssel 45', 60'		Castle 10'

André Kamperveen Stadion, Paramaribo, Suriname

== Central American zone ==
=== Group stage ===
==== Group A ====
Team	Pld	W	D	L	GF	GA	GD	Pts
Panama	2	2	0	0	2	0	+2	6
Costa Rica	2	1	0	1	4	1	+3	3
Nicaragua	2	0	0	2	0	5	−5	0

23 November 2010
(UTC−06:00)
Date 1

Costa Rica	4–0	Nicaragua
Campbell 4', 60'; Moya 59'; Ramirez 90'	Report

25 November 2010
(UTC−06:00)
Date 2

Panama	1–0	Costa Rica
Waterman 54'	Report

27 November 2010
(UTC−06:00)
Date 3

Panama	1–0	Nicaragua
Waterman 33'	Report

==== Group B ====
Team	Pld	W	D	L	GF	GA	GD	Pts
Honduras	2	2	0	0	7	0	+7	6
El Salvador	2	1	0	1	6	5	+1	3
Belize	2	0	0	2	1	9	−8	0

1 December 2010
(UTC−06:00)
Date 1

El Salvador	6–1	Belize
Herrera 15'; Santamaria 25', 28'; Larin 30', 88'; Corea 89'	Report	Salazar 39'

Estadio Nilmo Edwards, La Ceiba, Honduras
3 December 2010
(UTC−06:00)
Date 2

Honduras	4–0	El Salvador
Zuniga 2'; Carias 36'; Lopez 42'; Lozano 85'	Report

Estadio Nilmo Edwards, La Ceiba, Honduras
5 December 2010
(UTC−06:00)
Date 3

Honduras	3–0	Belize
Martinez 43'; Lozano 53' (pen.); Carias 82'	Report

Estadio Nilmo Edwards, La Ceiba, Honduras

=== Play-off ===
11 December 2010
(UTC−06:00)

El Salvador	1–0	Costa Rica
Corea 3'	Report

Estadio Jorge Calero Suárez, Metapán, El Salvador
18 December 2010
(UTC−06:00)

Costa Rica	1–1	El Salvador
Campbell 16'	Report	Corea 73'

Estadio Ricardo Saprissa, San José, Costa Rica

The Central American zone qualifying tournament was mired in controversy.

El Salvador had called-up United States under 17 international Dustin Corea to their national under-20 national team but did not write to FIFA request a change of association for the player as is required. Corea had previously played for United States in the 2009 CONCACAF U-17 Championship. On 4 February 2012 UNCAF published CONCACAF's decision to deny El Salvador a place at the 2011 CONCACAF Under-20 Championship for fielding an ineligible player in four games.

As a result, El Salvador's matches versus Belize (1 December), Honduras (4 December) and both games Costa Rica (11 and 18 December) should have been forfeited due to fielding an ineligible player as per FIFA regulations. However matters were complicated as Belize would have won their Group A game 3-0 against El Salvador and qualified for the play-off had the forfeit been brought in at an earlier time. Instead El Salvador reached the play-off final and played Costa Rica twice – later forfeiting both games 3-0, allowing Costa Rica to qualify despite losing the matches 2-1 on aggregate.
