= 2003 CONCACAF U-20 Tournament =

2003 CONCACAF U-20 Qualification
Tournament details
- Host countries: Panama; United States
- Dates: 16 October – 17 November
- Teams: 8 (from 1 confederation)
- Venues: 2 (in 2 host cities)

Tournament statistics
- Matches played: 12
- Goals scored: 27 (2.25 per match)
- All statistics correct as of 2009-08-11.

The 2003 CONCACAF U-20 Qualifying Tournament was held to determine the four CONCACAF entrants into the 2003 FIFA World Youth Championship, which was hosted in United Arab Emirates.

== Qualified teams ==
The following teams qualified for the tournament:

Region	Qualification	Qualifiers
Caribbean (CFU)	Caribbean qualifying	Cuba; Haiti
Central America (UNCAF)	Central American qualifying	El Salvador; Guatemala
Central America (UNCAF)	host	Panama
North America (NAFU)	host	United States
North America (NAFU)	automatically qualified	Canada; Mexico

== Group stage ==
=== Group A ===
Pos	Team	Pld	W	D	L	GF	GA	GD	Pts	Qualification
1	Panama (H)	3	3	0	0	5	1	+4	9	Qualified to U-20 FIFA World Cup
2	Mexico	3	2	0	1	7	3	+4	6	Qualified to U-20 FIFA World Cup
3	Cuba	3	1	0	2	1	4	−3	3	
4	Guatemala	3	0	0	3	1	6	−5	0	

Source: CONCACAF
(H) Hosts
October 16, 2002

Cuba	0 – 2	Mexico

Estadio Rod Carew, Panama City
October 16, 2002

Panama	1 – 0	Guatemala
Aguilar 89'

Estadio Rod Carew, Panama City

October 18, 2002

Guatemala	1 – 4	Mexico

Estadio Rod Carew, Panama City
October 18, 2002

Panama	2 – 0	Cuba
Gun 28'; Solís 53'

Estadio Rod Carew, Panama City

October 20, 2002

Cuba	1 – 0	Guatemala

Estadio Rod Carew, Panama City
October 20, 2002

Panama	2 – 1	Mexico
Gómez 67' (pen.), 90+2' (pen.)		Romo 2'

Estadio Rod Carew, Panama City

=== Group B ===
Pos	Team	Pld	W	D	L	GF	GA	GD	Pts	Qualification
1	Canada	3	2	1	0	5	2	+3	7	Qualified to U-20 FIFA World Cup
2	United States (H)	3	2	0	1	5	3	+2	6	Qualified to U-20 FIFA World Cup
3	Haiti	3	1	1	1	2	3	−1	4	
4	El Salvador	3	0	0	3	1	5	−4	0	

Source: CONCACAF
(H) Hosts
November 13, 2002

Canada	2 – 0	El Salvador
Godfrey 45'; Belotte 54'

Blackbaud Stadium, Charleston
November 13, 2002

United States	2 – 0	Haiti

Blackbaud Stadium, Charleston

November 15, 2002

Canada	0 – 0	Haiti

Blackbaud Stadium, Charleston
November 15, 2002

United States	1 – 0	El Salvador

Blackbaud Stadium, Charleston

November 17, 2002

El Salvador	1 – 2	Haiti

Blackbaud Stadium, Charleston
November 17, 2002

United States	2 – 3	Canada
Simek 73'; Johnson 76'		Hume 55', 71'; Lemire 70'

Blackbaud Stadium, Charleston

== See also ==
- 2003 CONCACAF U-20 Tournament qualifying
- CONCACAF Under-20 Championship
- 2003 FIFA World Youth Championship
