= 2001 CONCACAF U-20 Tournament qualifying =

This article features the 2001 CONCACAF U-20 Tournament qualifying stage. Caribbean and Central American teams entered in separate tournaments. The North American teams Mexico and the United States automatically qualified, as well as main tournament hosts Canada (North America) and Trinidad and Tobago (Caribbean). Fifteen Caribbean teams entered, of which one qualified and seven Central American teams entered, of which three qualified.

== Caribbean ==
=== Preliminary round ===
Surinam received a bye because Guyana withdrew.

Team 1	Agg.	Team 2	1st leg	2nd leg
Netherlands Antilles	1–3	Aruba	1–2	0–1
Montserrat	1–27	Dominica	0–12	1–15

=== Group stage ===
==== Group A ====
All matches were played in Haiti.

Teams	Pld	W	D	L	GF	GA	GD	Pts
Cuba	3	3	0	0	14	3	+11	9
Haiti	3	2	0	1	8	4	+4	6
Puerto Rico	3	1	0	2	3	10	–7	3
Aruba	3	0	0	3	6	14	–8	0

Cuba	8–2	Aruba
Haiti	4–0	Puerto Rico
Cuba	4–0	Puerto Rico
Haiti	3–2	Aruba
Haiti	1–2	Cuba
Puerto Rico	3–2	Aruba

==== Group B ====
Bermuda and the US Virgin Islands withdrew, so only two teams were left in this group.

Team 1	Agg.	Team 2	1st leg	2nd leg
Barbados	0–3	Dominican Republic	0–0	0–3

==== Group C ====
All matches were played in Jamaica.

Teams	Pld	W	D	L	GF	GA	GD	Pts
Jamaica	3	3	0	0	11	0	+11	9
Dominica	3	2	0	1	7	3	+4	6
Grenada	3	1	0	2	6	7	–1	3
Cayman Islands	3	0	0	3	1	15	–14	0

Jamaica	5–0	Cayman Islands
Dominica	2–1	Grenada
Jamaica	2–0	Dominica
Grenada	5–1	Cayman Islands
Jamaica	4–0	Grenada
Dominica	5–0	Cayman Islands

==== Group D ====
All matches were played in Suriname. Saint Lucia withdrew.

Teams	Pld	W	D	L	GF	GA	GD	Pts
Suriname	2	2	0	0	4	0	+4	6
Antigua and Barbuda	2	0	1	1	2	4	–2	1
Saint Vincent and the Grenadines	2	0	1	1	2	4	–2	1

Suriname	2–0	Saint Vincent and the Grenadines
Saint Vincent and the Grenadines	2–2	Antigua and Barbuda
Suriname	2–0	Antigua and Barbuda

=== Final round ===
Teams	Pld	W	D	L	GF	GA	GD	Pts
Jamaica	3	2	1	0	7	1	+6	7
Cuba	3	2	1	0	5	1	+4	7
Dominican Republic	3	1	0	2	2	4	–2	3
Suriname	3	0	0	3	3	11	–8	0

Jamaica	1–0	Dominican Republic
Cuba	3–1	Suriname
Jamaica	6–1	Suriname
Cuba	2–0	Dominican Republic
Suriname	1–2	Dominican Republic
Jamaica	0–0	Cuba

== Central America ==
All matches were played in Panama.

=== Group stage ===
==== Group A ====
Teams	Pld	W	D	L	GF	GA	GD	Pts
Panama	3	3	0	0	8	0	+8	9
Costa Rica	3	2	0	1	14	2	+12	6
Nicaragua	3	1	0	2	4	8	–4	3
Belize	3	0	0	3	2	18	–16	0

Costa Rica	6–0	Nicaragua
Panama	6–0	Belize
Nicaragua	4–1	Belize
Panama	1–0	Costa Rica
Belize	1–8	Costa Rica
Panama	1–0	Nicaragua

==== Group B ====
Teams	Pld	W	D	L	GF	GA	GD	Pts
Guatemala	2	1	1	0	2	1	+1	4
Honduras	2	1	0	1	1	1	0	3
El Salvador	2	0	1	1	1	2	–1	1

Guatemala	1–1	El Salvador
Honduras	1–0	El Salvador
Honduras	0–1	Guatemala

=== Semifinals ===
11 December 2000

Guatemala	3 – 3	Costa Rica
Penalties
	3 – 4

Panama
11 December 2000

Panama	0 – 2	Honduras

Panama

=== Third-place match ===
13 December 2000

Panama	1 – 2 (golden goal)	Guatemala

Panama

=== Final ===
13 December 2000

Costa Rica	3 – 0	Honduras

Panama

== Qualified for Main Tournament ==
- Jamaica (Caribbean winners)
- Costa Rica (Central American winners)
- Honduras (Central American runners-up)
- Guatemala (Central American third place)

== See also ==
- 2001 CONCACAF U-20 Tournament
