= Kiano Falcao =

Salvadoran footballer

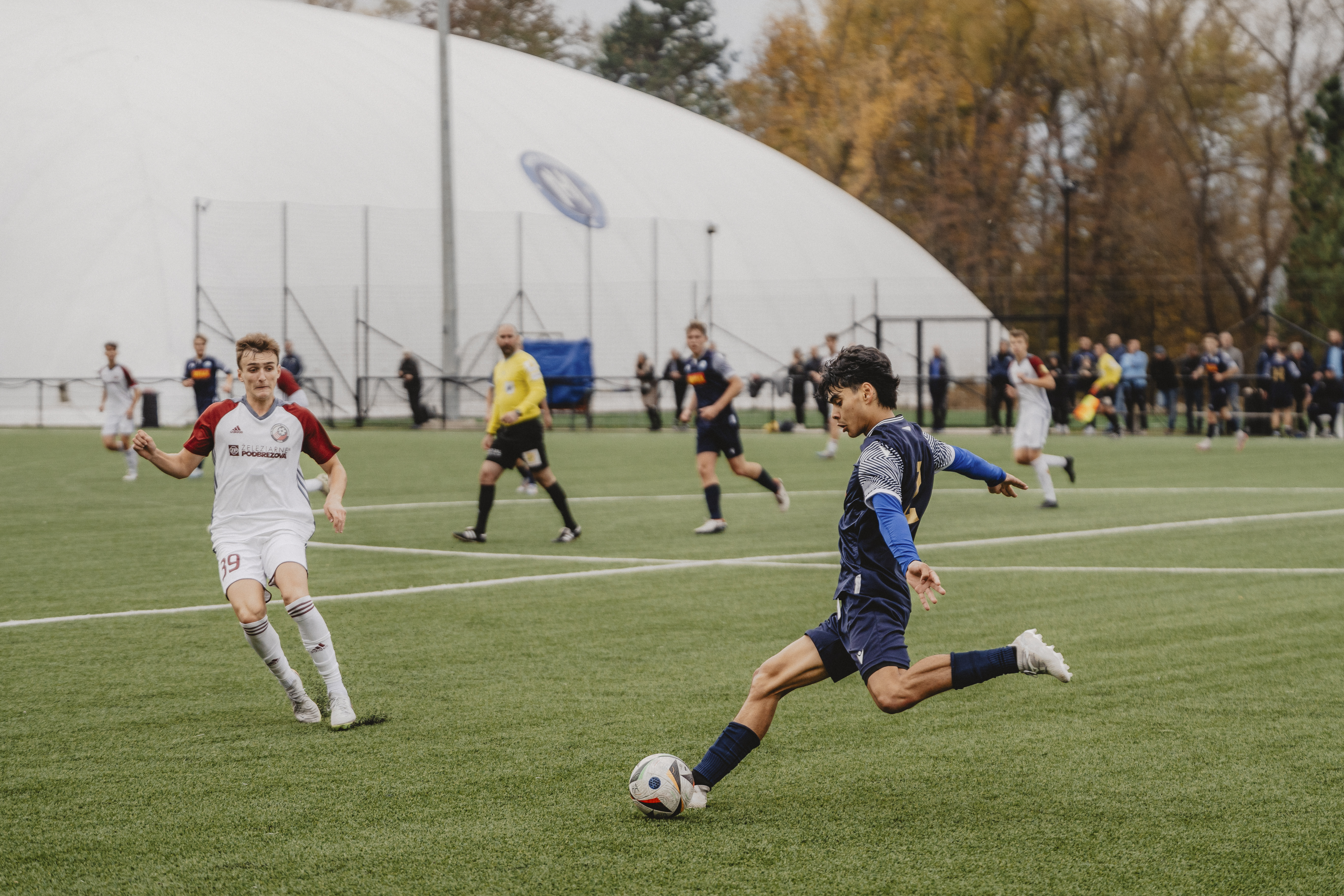
- Falcao in Slovakia

Personal information
- Full name: Kiano Falcao Casamalhuapa
- Date of birth: April 11, 2006 (age 20)
- Place of birth: Bakersfield, California, U.S.
- Height: 1.84 m (6 ft 0 in)
- Position: Centre-back

Team information
- Current team: MFK Bytča

Youth career
- 2017–2019: IdeaSport ESPN Orlando
- 2019: Rayo Vallecano
- 2020: Junior FC
- 2020–2021: Tampa Bay United
- 2021–2024: FC Cincinnati
- 2024–2025: RSC Hamsik Academy

Senior career*
| Years | Team | Apps | (Gls) |
| 2025–2026 | Atlético Huila | | |
| 2026 | Jednota Banová | | |
| 2026– | MFK Bytča | | |

International career^{‡}
| 2023 | El Salvador U17 | 5 | (0) |
| 2024 | El Salvador U20 | 13 | (2) |
| 2025– | El Salvador U21 | 4 | (0) |
- * Club domestic league appearances and goals as of 9 October 2026 ‡ National team caps and goals as of 9 October 2026

Kiano Falcao Casamalhuapa (born April 11, 2006), also known as Kiano Falcao, is a footballer who plays as a centre-back for Slovak club MFK Bytča. Born in the United States, he is a youth international for El Salvador.

== Club career ==
=== Early career ===
Falcao began his youth career with IdeaSport ESPN Orlando from 2017 to 2019. In August 2019, he moved to Spain to join Rayo Vallecano's youth academy, training with their first team youth academy in Madrid until December 2019.

In January 2020, Falcao joined Junior's U-15 team. He then moved to the United States, joining Tampa Bay United's USL U-15 team from August 2020 to June 2021.

=== FC Cincinnati ===
From August 2021 to June 2024, Falcao was part of the FC Cincinnati Academy, playing for both their U-17 and U-19 teams. He had a trial with Rayo Vallecano in Spain, training with their youth team and playing in friendly matches. Additionally, he trained with the youth teams of U.S. Salernitana and Cosenza Calcio in Italy.

=== RSC Hamsik Academy ===
On September 11, 2024, Falcao signed with RSC Hamsik Academy in Slovakia as a free agent and played for their U19 team.

=== Atlético Huila ===
In February 2025, Falcao joined the U20 team of Atlético Huila in Colombia, listed as Yumbo U20 after the club's relocation.

=== Jednota Banová ===
On March 26, 2026, Falcao returned to Slovakia, joining Jednota Banová on a free transfer.

=== MFK Bytča ===
In July 2026, Falcao joined MFK Bytča on a free transfer.

== International career ==
Falcao holds citizenship in four countries: the United States (by birth), El Salvador (paternal), Italy (maternal), and Colombia (maternal), but has chosen to represent El Salvador at the international level.

=== Youth career ===
He began his international career with El Salvador's U17 team, debuting on February 11, 2023, and making 5 appearances. He played at the 2023 CONCACAF U-17 Championship, appearing in all three group matches and two knockout matches as El Salvador reached the quarterfinals.

He debuted for the U20 team on January 18, 2024, and went on to make 13 appearances and score 2 goals. He was selected for the 2024 CONCACAF U-20 Championship squad by Spanish coach Juan Cortés. In July 2024 he was named among the defenders for the squad's final training camp before the tournament.

He debuted for the U21 team on October 21, 2025, and has made 4 appearances.

=== 2024 CONCACAF U-20 Championship ===
Falcao participated in the 2024 CONCACAF U-20 Championship held in Irapuato, Mexico. El Salvador was drawn into Group B alongside Honduras, Canada, and the Dominican Republic. The team started with a 1–0 victory against the Dominican Republic but subsequently lost to Honduras (4–1) and Canada (2–1). El Salvador finished third in the group with three points and a goal difference, which was insufficient to advance to the knockout stages.
