= Eduardo Lara =

Colombian football manager (born 1959)

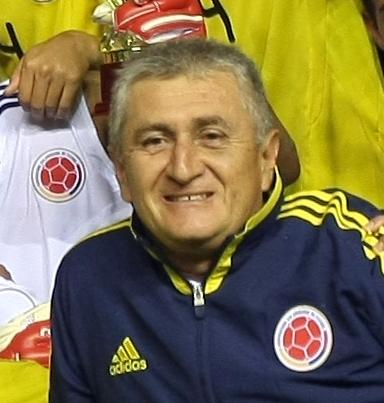

Personal information
- Full name: Eduardo Lara Lozano
- Date of birth: 4 September 1959 (age 67)
- Place of birth: Cali, Colombia

Team information
- Current team: Alianza (Manager)

Managerial career
- Years: Team
- 2000: Expreso Palmira
- 2001: Deportes Quindío
- 2002–2007: Colombia U17
- 2005–2008: Colombia U20
- 2008–2009: Colombia
- 2010–2011: Colombia U20
- 2012: América de Cali
- 2014: Boyacá Chicó
- 2016–2017: El Salvador U20
- 2016–2017: El Salvador
- 2018–2019: Envigado
- 2020: El Nacional
- 2021: Once Caldas
- 2022–2023: Alianza
- 2026–: El Salvador U20

Eduardo Lara Lozano (born 4 September 1959 in Cali) is a Colombian football manager. Lara has coached all levels of the Colombian national youth team. He is currently the manager of El Salvador U20.

== Career ==
Lara led the Colombia U17s to a third place finish at the 2002 South American Championship. This finish allowed them to qualify to the U-17 World Championship the following year, where they finished fourth after losing to champions Brazil in the semi-finals.

Lara and his U17 team were eliminated from the South American Championship and failed to qualify for the U17 World Cup. He led the Colombia U20s to the 2005 South American Championship title and to the U20 World Cup that same year, where they finished first in their group but lost in the round of 16 to champions Argentina which had Lionel Messi.

In 2007 his U20 team failed to make it to the World Cup, but the under-17s qualified for the World Cup by finishing runner-up to Brazil in the South American championship. In the World cup they were eliminated by eventual champions Nigeria at the round of 16.

On September 19, 2008, he was named as a provisional manager for the Colombian national team after Jorge Luis Pinto was dismissed by the Colombian Football Federation. He led the team in the matches against Paraguay and Brazil for the 2010 World Cup qualifiers. After an important draw against Brazil in Rio de Janeiro, the Colombia Football Federation decided to keep him as permanent manager for the rest of the qualifiers. However, after Colombia failed to qualify for the 2010 World Cup, he resigned as manager, having only achieved 13 points in 10 games.

Colombia had a poor performance at the 2011 South American Championship, finishing last in the final phase with just one point, which meant Colombia would miss out on the 2012 Summer Olympics, although Colombia already had their spot in the World Cup secured by being host of the 2011 U20 World Cup.

However Colombia had a better performance at the World Cup, finishing first in their group and winning all of their games, only conceding one goal. Colombia lost in the quarter-finals to Mexico 3-1 after having beat Costa Rica in the round of 16. Lara led Colombia to the title in the 2011 Toulon Tournament.

On November 12, 2019, El Nacional of the Ecuadorian Serie A announced the signing of Lara as the new manager.

== Honours ==
Deportes Quindío

- Categoría Primera B (1): 2001
