= Marvin Baumgartner =

Swiss-born Salvadoran footballer

Personal information
- Full name: Marvin Baumgartner Revelo
- Date of birth: January 13, 1993 (age 33)
- Place of birth: Bülach, Switzerland
- Height: 1.79 m (5 ft 10 in)
- Position: Defender

Team information
- Current team: FC Bassersdorf

Youth career
- 2004–2005: FC Kloten
- 2005–2011: Zürich

Senior career*
Years	Team	Apps	(Gls)
2011–2014	Zürich II	44	(0)
2014	FC Wettswill-Bonstetten	7	(0)
2015	Real Monarchs	2	(0)
2016–2018	FC Bassersdorf		
2018–2019	FC Embrach		
2020–	FC Bassersdorf		

International career
	Switzerland U15	2	(0)
	Switzerland U16	5	(0)
2013	El Salvador U20	7	(0)
2014	El Salvador U21	3	(0)
- * Club domestic league appearances and goals as of March 29, 2016

Marvin Baumgartner Revelo (born January 13, 1994) is a Swiss-born Salvadoran footballer who last played for FC Bassersdorf in the 2. Liga Interregional.

== Personal ==
Marvin Baumgartner Revelo was born in Switzerland to a Swiss father and Salvadoran mother.

== Career ==
Baumgartner began his youth career in Switzerland playing for FC Kloten. After one successful season, he was scouted by one of the most important teams in Switzerland, FC Zurich. He joined the U13 squad where he went up the ranks (U14, U15, U16, U17, U18) until he reached the Reserve squad (FC Zurich II) where he played for 4 seasons. During the 2012 season Marvin participated in 4 friendly matches with the senior squad. In the summer of 2014, he joined FC Wettswill-Bonstetten of the Swiss fourth division.

On 2 February 2015, Baumgartner signed his first professional contract with USL side Real Monarchs, making his first appearance on 29 March 2015 in a match against Portland Timbers 2.

== International ==
Between 2008-2010 Baumgartner was a member on the Swiss U15, U16, and U17 National teams. He never played an official match with the youth squads, making him eligible to play for El Salvador. In 2012, he was discovered by Salvadoran scouting blog SelectaTalent. he caught the attention of the Salvadoran Football Federation and was called in to a Pre-U20 WC qualifier camp. Head coach Mauricio Alfaro was impressed by his abilities on the pitch, and ability to adapt to a country where he didn't speak the language. He was named to the final roster and played every minute in the 2013 FIFA U-20 World Cup Qualifiers in Puebla, Mexico, where the team went on to qualify to the first U-20 World cup in the history of Salvadoran football.

In the summer of 2013, he was named to the 2013 FIFA U-20 World Cup roster. He played every minute of the World Cup group stage. In November 2014, he was named to the U-21 Roster to play the Central American and Caribbean Games that took place in Veracruz, Mexico. Once again Marvin played every minute for the National team.
