= Anita Cristina Escher Echeverría =

Salvadoran diplomat (born 1958)

Anita Cristina Escher Echeverría (born 29 August 1958) is a diplomat from El Salvador.

Born in New Orleans to a Swiss-Salvadoran family, Anita Cristina Escher Echeverría studied in the United States, Switzerland, Zurich, Aachen and Paris. She received a degree in Latin American literacy in 1986 from the University of Paris III: Sorbonne Nouvelle, a master's degree from Paris Nanterre University in 1984, and a degree in literacy from the University of Zurich and RWTH Aachen University in 1983.

From 2005, she was project coordinator and, with Lis Füglister, managing director of the Swiss section of Medico International, in Zurich. She was an election observer in the presidential elections in January 2009 in El Salvador. In the summer of 2009, Anita Escher traveled El Salvador as a reporter.

She was named El Salavador's ambassador to Germany in December 2009. The presentation of her credentials on 28 May 2010 was one of the last official acts of Horst Köhler. She was also accredited as concurrent ambassador to Moscow, Warsaw, Prague and Ankara. In 2015 she received the Order of Merit of the Federal Republic of Germany In 2015, she was nominated as ambassador to the Nordic and Baltic countries, Sweden, and Iceland and has served as the ambassador to Estonia since 2018.
