= 2001 CONCACAF U-20 Tournament =

Premundial CONCACAF Sub-20 2001 (in Spanish)

Tournament details
- Host countries: Canada; Trinidad and Tobago
- Dates: 28 February – 22 March
- Teams: 8 (from 1 confederation)

Tournament statistics
- Matches played: 12
- Goals scored: 34 (2.83 per match)
- All statistics correct as of 27 July 2010.

The 2001 CONCACAF Under-20 Championship was played from 28 February to 22 Match 2001, the competition was divided into two groups of 4 teams, the top two from each group qualified to the 2001 FIFA World Youth Championship held in Argentina.

The tournament was marred by a collision between Landon Donovan of the U.S. and Trinidad and Tobago's Marvin Lee that left Lee paralysed; he died two years later.

== Qualified teams ==
The following teams qualified for the tournament:

Region	Qualification	Qualifiers
Caribbean (CFU)	Caribbean qualifying	Jamaica
Caribbean (CFU)	host	Trinidad and Tobago
Central America (UNCAF)	Central American qualifying	Costa Rica; Guatemala; Honduras
North America (NAFU)	host	Canada
North America (NAFU)	automatically qualified	Mexico; United States

== Group A ==
Pos	Team	Pld	W	D	L	GF	GA	GD	Pts	Qualification
1	Costa Rica	3	2	1	0	12	2	+10	7	Qualified to the 2001 FIFA World Youth Championship
2	United States	3	2	1	0	11	2	+9	7	Qualified to the 2001 FIFA World Youth Championship
3	Trinidad and Tobago	3	0	1	2	1	8	−7	1	
4	Guatemala	3	0	1	2	1	13	−12	1	

18 March 2001 Round 1	Guatemala	0 – 5	United States	Port of Spain, Trinidad and Tobago
				Stadium: Hasely Crawford Stadium

18 March 2001 Round 1	Trinidad and Tobago	0 – 3	Costa Rica	Port of Spain, Trinidad and Tobago
				Stadium: Hasely Crawford Stadium

20 March 2001 Round 2	Costa Rica	8 – 1	Guatemala	Port of Spain, Trinidad and Tobago
				Stadium: Hasely Crawford Stadium

20 March 2001 Round 2	Trinidad and Tobago	1 – 5	United States	Port of Spain, Trinidad and Tobago
				Stadium: Hasely Crawford Stadium

22 March 2001 Round 3	Costa Rica	1 – 1	United States	Port of Spain, Trinidad and Tobago
				Stadium: Hasely Crawford Stadium

22 March 2001 Round 3	Trinidad and Tobago	0 – 0	Guatemala	Port of Spain, Trinidad and Tobago
				Stadium: Hasely Crawford Stadium

== Group B ==
Pos	Team	Pld	W	D	L	GF	GA	GD	Pts	Qualification
1	Canada	3	2	1	0	2	0	+2	7	Qualified to the 2001 FIFA World Youth Championship
2	Jamaica	3	1	2	0	3	2	+1	5	Qualified to the 2001 FIFA World Youth Championship
3	Mexico	3	1	1	1	3	2	+1	4	
4	Honduras	3	0	0	3	1	5	−4	0	

28 February 2001
Round 1

Jamaica	1 – 1	Mexico

28 February 2001
Round 1

Canada	1 – 0	Honduras
de Guzman 9'

Centennial Park Stadium, Toronto, Canada
Attendance: 3,317

2 March 2001
Round 2

Honduras	1 – 2	Jamaica

2 March 2001
Round 2

Canada	1 – 0	Mexico
de Guzman 20'

Centennial Park Stadium, Toronto, Canada
Attendance: 4,833

4 March 2001
Round 3

Honduras	0 – 2	Mexico

4 March 2001
Round 3

Canada	0 – 0	Jamaica

Centennial Park Stadium, Toronto, Canada
Attendance: 5,000

== See also ==
- 2001 CONCACAF U-20 Tournament qualifying
- 2001 FIFA World Youth Championship
- CONCACAF
