= 1998 CONCACAF U-20 Tournament =

Premundial CONCACAF Sub-20 1998 (in Spanish)

Tournament details
- Host countries: Guatemala; Trinidad and Tobago
- Dates: 5 August – 10 October
- Teams: 8 (from 1 confederation)
- Venue: 2 (in 2 host cities)
- All statistics correct as of 24 March 2011.

The 1998 CONCACAF U-20 Tournament served as qualification for the 1999 FIFA World Youth Championship in Nigeria. The tournament took place from 5 August–10 October, although qualification started before.

== Qualified teams ==
The following teams qualified for the tournament:

Region	Qualification	Qualifiers
Caribbean (CFU)	Caribbean qualifying	Jamaica
Caribbean (CFU)	host	Trinidad and Tobago
Central America (UNCAF)	host	Guatemala
Central America (UNCAF)	Central American qualifying	Costa Rica; Honduras
North America (NAFU)	Automatically qualified	Canada; Mexico; United States

== Final stage ==
=== Group A ===
Pos	Team	Pld	W	D	L	GF	GA	GD	Pts	Qualification
1	Mexico	3	3	0	0	9	2	+7	9	Qualified to the 1999 FIFA World Youth Championship
2	Honduras	3	2	0	1	7	4	+3	6	Qualified to the 1999 FIFA World Youth Championship
3	Guatemala	3	1	0	2	3	5	−2	3	
4	Jamaica	3	0	0	3	4	12	−8	0	

6 November 1998

Jamaica	2 – 5	Mexico

Estadio Doroteo Guamuch Flores, Guatemala City
6 November 1998

Guatemala	1 – 2	Honduras

Estadio Doroteo Guamuch Flores, Guatemala City

8 November 1998

Honduras	0 – 2	Mexico

Estadio Doroteo Guamuch Flores, Guatemala City
8 November 1998

Guatemala	2 – 1	Jamaica

Estadio Doroteo Guamuch Flores, Guatemala City

10 November 1998

Honduras	5 – 1	Jamaica

Estadio Doroteo Guamuch Flores, Guatemala City
10 November 1998

Guatemala	0 – 2	Mexico

Estadio Doroteo Guamuch Flores, Guatemala City

=== Group B ===
Pos	Team	Pld	W	D	L	GF	GA	GD	Pts	Qualification
1	United States	3	2	1	0	12	3	+9	7	Qualified to the 1999 FIFA World Youth Championship
2	Costa Rica	3	2	1	0	6	1	+5	7	Qualified to the 1999 FIFA World Youth Championship
3	Canada	3	1	0	2	4	7	−3	3	
4	Trinidad and Tobago	3	0	0	3	2	13	−11	0	

5 August 1998

Costa Rica	1 – 1	United States

5 August 1998

Trinidad and Tobago	1 – 3	Canada
		Bernier; De Serpa; Ribeiro

7 August 1998

Canada	1 – 5	United States
De Serpa 47'		Albright 21', 56'; Beasley 26'; Garcia 41', 50'

7 August 1998

Trinidad and Tobago	0 – 4	Costa Rica

9 August 1998

Trinidad and Tobago	1 – 6	United States

9 August 1998

Canada	0 – 1	Costa Rica

== See also ==
- 1998 CONCACAF U-20 Tournament qualifying
