= Franklin Chacón (footballer) =

Costa Rican footballer (born 1985)

Personal information
- Full name: Franklin Chacón Orozco
- Date of birth: 18 June 1985 (age 41)
- Place of birth: Costa Rica
- Height: 1.73 m (5 ft 8 in)
- Positions: Forward; midfielder

Team information
- Current team: Puntarenas
- Number: 11

Youth career
- Herediano

Senior career*
Years	Team	Apps	(Gls)
2005–2008	Herediano		
2005	→ Seattle Sounders (loan)	12	(0)
2006–2007	→ Santacruceña (loan)		
2008–2009	→ Puntarenas (loan)		
2009–2010	Puntarenas	30	(2)
2010–2011	Uruguay de Coronado		
2011	Puntarenas	11	(1)
2011–2013	Carmelita	41	(5)
2014–	Puntarenas	21	(2)

International career
- Costa Rica U20
- * Club domestic league appearances and goals as of 1 June 2014

Franklin Chacón Orozco (born 18 June 1985) is a Costa Rican footballer who currently plays for Puntarenas.

== Career ==
Chacón began his career in the youth ranks of Herediano before moving to the United States to join Seattle Sounders on a year-long loan. During his stint there, he made 12 appearances and recorded his only point of the year on 4 June 2005, in a 2–1 away win over Virginia Beach Mariners. Picking up an assist on the second goal of the match by Roger Levesque. Seattle went on to win the 2005 USL First Division title.

In December 2008, he was out of contract and released by Herediano.

== Honours ==
=== Seattle Sounders ===
- USL First Division Championship (1): 2005
