= Marco Parra (footballer) =

Mexican footballer (born 1985)

Marco Antonio Parra Téllez (born 22 January 1985) is a Mexican footballer who plays as a forward.

== Career ==
Parra emerged from the youth ranks of Chivas, and made his debut with the first team as an 18-year-old on 22 October 2003. He was acclaimed as a very promising prospect but failed to gain a place in Primera División de Mexico. Parra played only 14 games and scored thirteen goals in his three seasons with the club's first team.
