= United States Virgin Islands national under-20 soccer team =

U.S. Virgin Islands Under-20
- Association: USVI Soccer Federation
- Confederation: CONCACAF (Caribbean)
- FIFA code: VIR
First colors	Second colors

First international
- Saint Kitts and Nevis 8–0 U.S. Virgin Islands (10 July 2002)

Biggest win
- U.S. Virgin Islands 3–0 British Virgin Islands (U.S. Virgin Islands; 11 July 2006); U.S. Virgin Islands 3–0 Turks and Caicos Islands (Frederiksted, U.S. Virgin Islands; 14 September 2010)

Biggest defeat
- U.S. Virgin Islands 0–14 Canada (Managua, Nicaragua; 26 February 2026)

The United States Virgin Islands national under-20 soccer team represents US Virgin Islands in international soccer at this age level and is controlled by U.S. Virgin Islands Soccer Federation, the governing body for soccer in US Virgin Islands.

== Current squad ==
The following players were called for the 2011 CONCACAF U-20 Championship qualifying.

No.	Pos.	Player	Date of birth (age)	Caps	Goals	Club
	GK	Walton Stuart	August 25, 1993 (age 33)	3	0	
	GK	Morgan Bryan	March 27, 1993 (age 33)	2	0	
	DF	Sunnil Stuart	October 27, 1991 (age 35)	2	0	
	DF	Malcom Edwards	April 30, 1993 (age 33)	5	0	
	DF	Buronny Titre	March 7, 1992 (age 34)	4	0	

== See also ==
- United States Virgin Islands national soccer team
